= List of Wellington representative cricketers =

List of cricketers

This is a list of cricketers who have played first-class, List A or Twenty20 cricket for the Wellington cricket team. Wellington played its first first-class match in November 1873 against Auckland at the Basin Reserve in Wellington. The team has competed for the Plunket Shield since the competition's inaugural season in 1906–07, played its first List A cricket match in 1971 and its first Twenty20 cricket match in 2006. It has played in every senior cricket competition in New Zealand. The modern Wellington Cricket Association represents the metropolitan Wellington area and the Hutt Valley in New Zealand's North Island and is one of six first-class teams in the country.

Players are listed in alphabetical order. Seasons given are the first and last seasons the player played at senior level for the team. Players may not have played in every intervening season and many players will have appeared for other teams during their career.

As of 8 November 2025

== A ==
- Muhammad Abbas, 2022/23–2024/25
- Wayne Aberhart, 1985/86
- John Aiken, 1989/90–1998/99
- Greg Aim, 1960/61–1962/63
- David Airey, 1977/78
- Wilfrid Airey, 1927/28–1939/40
- Arthur Aldersley, 1909/10–1922/23
- Ivan Allardyce, 1918/19
- Finn Allen, 2020/21–2022/23
- Gary Allen, 1976/77–1979/80
- Ray Allen, 1941/42–1953/54
- Simon Allen, 2007/08–2008/09
- Paul Allott, 1985/86–1986/87
- Frank Alpe, 1908/09
- Samuel Alpe, 1882/83–1884/85
- John Anderson, 1977/78
- Frederick Andrews, 1941/42
- Thomas Armitage, 1874/75–1881/82
- Brent Arnel, 2013/14–2016/17
- Frank Ashbolt, 1893/94–1900/01
- Jack Ashenden, 1935/36–1944/45
- Michael Austen, 1992/93–1995/96
- Joe Austin-Smellie, 2009/10–2011/12
- Azhar Abbas, 2004/05

== B ==
- Matt Bacon, 2015/16
- Ted Badcock, 1924/25–1929/30
- Wallace Bain, 1937/38–1944/45
- Geoffrey Baker, 1991/92–1994/95
- George Baker, 1919/20–1920/21
- Wiri Baker, 1911/12–1929/30
- Lakshmipathy Balaji, 2008/09
- John Banks, 1923/24–1925/26
- Trevor Barber, 1945/46–1958/59
- Wally Barclay, 1920/21–1925/26
- Brady Barnett, 2014/15
- Andrew Barron, 1905/06
- Alfred Barton, 1904/05
- Paul Barton, 1954/55–1967/68
- Don Beard, 1945/46
- Leonard Beard, 1927/28
- Mark Beban, 1969/70
- John Beck, 1954/55–1961/62
- Ernest Beechey, 1906/07–1918/19
- John Behrent, 1959/60
- Francis Bell, 1873/74–1876/77
- Matthew Bell, 1997/98–2010/11
- Charles Benbow, 1891/92–1896/97
- Arthur Bennett, 1913/14–1917/18
- Hamish Bennett, 2016/17–2021/22
- Carl Berendsen, 1911/12
- Ernest Bernau, 1922/23–1927/28
- Francis Betts, 1873/74
- Fred Beyeler, 1985/86–1989/90
- Ernest Bezzant, 1943/44
- Jakob Bhula, 2018/19–2022/23
- Grahame Bilby, 1962/63–1976/77
- Ian Billcliff, 1995/96
- Douglas Binnie, 1921/22
- Arthur Birch, 1909/10–1910/11
- Travis Birt, 2010/11–2013/14
- W Bishop, 1874/75 (Note: Bishop played in a single match for Wellington in the 1874–75 season. No biographical details are known.)
- Arthur Blacklock, 1884/85–1895/96
- Carne Blacklock, 1905/06
- James P Blacklock, 1904/05–1913/14
- James W Blacklock, 1877/78–1883/84
- Robert Blacklock, 1883/84–1895/96
- Selwyn Blackmore, 1991/92–2001/02
- Bob Blair, 1951/52–1964/65
- Ernest Blamires, 1911/12–1912/13
- Jim Blandford, 1932/33–1936/37
- Denis Blundell, 1930/31–1937/38
- Tom Blundell, 2012/13–2025/26
- Harry Boam, 2008/09–2012/13
- Edward Boddington, 1887/88
- Edgar Bold, 1919/20
- Bruce Bolton, 1966/67–1970/71
- K Bond, 1876/77 (Note: Bond played in a single match for Wellington in the 1876–77 season. No biographical details are known.)
- Cameron Borgas, 2012/13
- Scott Borthwick, 2015/16–2016/17
- DeWayne Bowden, 2005/06–2010/11
- Frederick Bowles, 1911/12
- Tim Boyer, 1997/98–1999/00
- Justin Boyle, 1982/83–1985/86
- Michael Bracewell, 2017/18–2024/25
- John Bray, 1958/59–1966/67
- William Bray, 1914/15–1920/21
- Ian Brennan, 1958/59
- Don Brian, 1946/47
- William Brice, 1902/03–1927/28
- Joshua Brodie, 2007/08–2013/14
- Edgar Brooke, 1889/90
- Ron Broom, 1954/55
- Dougie Brown, 1995/96
- James Brown, 1879/80–1884/85 (Note: Brown played in six matches for Wellington from 1879–80 to 1884–85. No biographical details are known.)
- Lionel Browne, 1928/29–1930/31
- Maurice Browne, 1937/38–1951/52
- Alex Bruce, 1907/08–1922/23
- John Bryce, 1876/77
- Ray Buchan, 1943/44–1945/46
- Carl Bulfin, 1998/99–2000/01
- George Burnes, 1883/84–1886/87
- Graham Burnett, 1987/88–1992/93
- Noel Burnette, 1940/41–1945/46
- John Burns, 1914/15
- Michael Burns, 2006/07–2009/10
- David Burt, 1924/25
- Bill Burton, 1940/41
- Herbert EL Burton, 1909/10–1921/22
- Herbert GEL Burton, 1893/94–1897/98
- John Burton, 1946/47
- Leslie Butler, 1951/52–1967/68

== C ==
- Craig Cachopa, 2011/12–2015/16
- Marc Calkin, 2010/11
- Douglas Cameron, 1929/30–1932/33
- Jack Capstick, 1946/47
- Alf Cate, 1908/09–1922/23
- Stew Cater, 1974/75–1982/83
- Harry Cave, 1945/46–1949/50
- Brian Cederwall, 1973/74–1983/84
- Grant Cederwall, 1978/79–1990/91
- Rex Challies, 1946/47–1955/56
- Sunnie Chan, 2009/10
- Phil Chandler, 1994/95–2001/02
- Harold Chapman, 1943/44–1944/45
- John Chapman, 1885/86–1886/87
- Ewen Chatfield, 1973/74–1989/90
- Walter Chisholm, 1885/86
- Walter Christopherson, 1926/27
- Alan Clark, 1955/56–1957/58
- Alfred Clarke, 1900/01–1901/02
- Mark Cleary, 2010/11
- Thomas Cobcroft, 1906/07–1909/10
- C Cockburn, 1887/88 (Note: Cockburn played in a single match for Wellington in the 1887–88 season. No biographical details are known.)
- Mike Coles, 1966/67–1975/76
- Barry Coley, 1971/72
- Richard Collinge, 1967/68–1974/75
- David Collins, 1905/06–1926/27
- William Collins, 1887/88–1888/1889
- Fraser Colson, 2013/14–2020/21
- James Condliffe, 1917/18–1922/23
- Chris Coney, 1966/67
- Jeremy Coney, 1971/72–1986/87
- Bevan Congdon, 1971/72
- Thomas Connell, 1901/02
- Philip Connelly, 1908/09
- Devon Conway, 2017/18–2024/25
- Allan Cook, 1955/56–1956/57
- Charles Cornish, 1874/75
- Peter Coutts, 1969/70
- Theodolphus Cox, 1883/84–1886/87
- Jack Crawford, 1917/18
- Roy Crawford, 1937/38–1947/48
- William Crawshaw, 1891/92
- Thomas Creeks, 1886/87
- Arthur Cresswell, 1948/49–1949/50
- Fen Cresswell, 1949/50
- Melville Crombie, 1900/01–1911/12
- BJ Crook, 2007/08–2009/10
- Ronald Crook, 1930/31–1933/34
- Christopher Cross, 1884/85–1895/96
- Dave Crowe, 1953/54
- Martin Crowe, 1990/91–1994/95
- John Crowther, 1873/74–1881/82
- Clive Currie, 1976/77
- Mike Curtis, 1955/56–1958/59

== D ==
- CJ Dalton, 1893/94 (Note: Dalton played in a single match for Wellington in the 1893–94 season. No biographical details are known.)
- John D'Arcy, 1959/60
- Heath Davis, 1991/92–1998/99
- Winston Davis, 1990/91
- Alecz Day, 2014/15–2015/16
- George Day, 1903/04
- Jeremy Dean, 2008/09
- James Dees, 1873/74
- Eric Dempster, 1947/48–1960/61
- Stewie Dempster, 1921/22–1932/33
- Artie Dick, 1962/63–1971/72
- George Dickinson, 1943/44
- James Dickson, 1911/12–1914/15
- MJ Dind, 1917/18–1919/20 (Note: The identity of this player is unclear. He is sometimes identified as Melbourne Hall Dind, but contemporary sources refer to him as MJ Dind.)
- Tom Dollery, 1950/51
- Grant Donaldson, 1998/99–2003/04
- Arthur Doneghue, 1919/20–1927/28
- Martin Donnelly, 1936/37–1940/41
- Theo Doropoulos, 2012/13
- Mark Douglas, 1993/94–1994/95
- Lincoln Doull, 1990/91–1995/96
- Thomas Downes, 1940/41–1946/47
- Frank Dredge, 1905/06
- Lance Dry, 1994/95–1998/99
- Charles Dryden, 1884/85–1894/95
- Walter Dryden, 1885/86
- Victor du Chateau, 1932/33–1939/40
- Liam Dudding, 2024/25–2025/26
- Jack Duffy, 1940/41–1945/46
- Douglas Dumbleton, 1947/48
- Alfred Duncan, 1919/20
- Arthur AK Duncan, 1879/80
- Arthur DS Duncan, 1893/94–1900/01
- Ernest Duret, 1886/87–1887/88
- William Dustin, 1927/28–1943/44

== E ==
- Arthur Edgar, 1955/56
- Bruce Edgar, 1975/76–1989/90
- Ernest Edmunds, 1875/76–1876/77
- Lee Edwards, 1998/99–2010/11
- Jimmy Ell, 1933/34–1945/46
- Grant Elliott, 2005/06–2016/17
- Sandhurst England, 1879/80
- Henry Evans, 1873/74–1875/76

== F ==
- Sam Fairley, 2001/02–2006/07
- Arthur Fenton, 1911/12–1914/15
- Wilfred Findlay, 1910/11–1911/12
- Charles Finlayson, 1909/10–1920/21
- Joseph Firth, 1882/83–1885/86
- Eric Fisher, 1951/52–1953/54
- Edward Fitzsimmons, 1889/90–1895/96
- James Flanaghan (Note: Flanaghan played in a single match for Wellington in the 1873–74 season. No biographical details are known.)
- Stephen Fleming, 2000/01–2007/08
- Andrew Fletcher, 2018/19–2020/21
- Luke Fletcher, 2014/15
- Henry Foley, 1927/28–1932/33
- Michael Foley, 1876/77
- Kevin Forde, 2006/07
- William Fordham, 1877/78
- Stanley Foster, 1909/10
- Roger Fouhy, 2005/06
- John Francis, 1880/81
- James Franklin, 1998/99–2014/15
- Angus Fraser, 1987/88
- Doug Freeman, 1932/33–1933/34
- Tipene Friday, 2010/11–2012/13
- William Frith, 1889/90–1893/94
- Donald Fuller, 1889/90–1894/95

== G ==
- Norman Gallichan, 1929/30–1938/39
- William Gardiner, 1895/96
- CW Garrod, 1917/18–1919/20 (Note: Garrod played in four matches for Wellington between the 1917–18 season and 1919–20. No biographical details are known.)
- Walter Garwood, 1876/77
- Arnold Gedye, 1919/20
- Steve Gellatly, 2007/08
- Arthur George, 1913/14
- Luke Georgeson, 2019/20–2022/23
- William Gibbes, 1905/06–1914/15
- Jamie Gibson, 2014/15–2021/22
- Maurice Giles, 1951/52–1953/54
- Richard Gilhooly, 2004/05
- Mark Gillespie, 1999/00–2014/15
- Scott Golder, 1998/99–2007/08
- Frederick Gooder, 1884/85
- Matthew Goodson, 1991/92–1994/95
- Arthur Gore, 1885/86–1888/89
- Charles Gore, 1891/92–1903/04
- Ross Gore, 1896/97
- Gouge, 1874/75–1875/76 (Note: Gouge played in two matches for Wellington, one in each of the 1874–75 and 1875–76 seasons. No biographical details are known.)
- Thomas Grace, 1911/12–1913/14
- Alec Grant, 1922/23–1924/25
- Evan Gray, 1975/76–1991/92
- Wayne Greenstreet, 1969/70–1972/73
- Nick Greenwood, 2021/22–2025/26
- Adrian Griffiths, 1984/85–1985/86
- Bernard Griffiths, 1931/32–1937/38
- Clarrie Grimmett, 1911/12–1913/14
- Evan Gulbis, 2016/17
- John Guy, 1960/61

== H ==
- Stean Hainsworth, 1988/89
- G Haldane, 1885/86 (Note: Haldane played in a single match for Wellington in the 1885–86 season. No biographical details are known.)
- Everett Hales, 1896/97–1909/10
- John Hamilton, 1877/78–1879/80
- Rory Hamilton-Brown, 2011/12
- John Hammel, 1965/66
- Thomas Harpur, 1938/39
- Leonard Harris, 1891/92–1893/94
- Mike Harris, 1975/76
- Victor Harris, 1913/14 (Note: Harris played in a single match for Wellington in the 1913–14 season. No biographical details are known.)
- Ron Hart, 1992/93–1993/94
- James Hartshorn, 2020/21–2025/26
- Wilf Haskell, 1955/56–1968/69
- Brian Hastings, 1957/58
- Keith Hatch, 1945/46
- Ronald Hatch, 1933/34 (Note: Hatch, who was born at Wellington in 1913 and educated at Palmerston North Boys' High School, played a single match for Wellington during the 1933–34 season taking two wickets and scoring 11 runs. The brother of Keith Hatch, he died at Perth in 2004.)
- Joseph Haughton, 1876/77
- Arthur Hawthorne, 1906/07–1909/10
- David Hay, 1913/14–1914/15 (Note: Hay played in six matches for Wellington, five during the 1913–14 season and one in 1914–15. He scored a total of 227 runs, including a highest score of 47 not out made against Canterbury on debut. Other than that he was educated at Wellington College, no biographical details are known.)
- George Heenan, 1882/83–1887/88
- Matt Henderson, 1921/22–1931/32
- David Henry, 1980/81
- Wilfred Hepburn, 1931/32–1940/41
- Jayde Herrick, 2010/11
- David Hewat, 1887/88–1889/90
- Allan Hewson, 1978/79
- Charles Hickey, 1902/03–1910/11
- Claude Hickson, 1898/99–1911/12
- Henry Hickson, 1879/80–1881/82
- William Hickson, 1896/97–1906/07
- Syd Hiddleston, 1913/14–1928/29
- Paul Hitchcock, 1999/00–2009/10
- Frank Hoar, 1928/29
- Newman Hoar, 1944/45
- Brad Hodge, 2014/15
- George Hodge, 1907/08
- Alfred Holdship, 1893/94–1898/99
- Frank Holdsworth, 1891/92–1902/03
- Bob Holland, 1987/88
- Chester Holland, 1923/24–1924/25
- Peter Holland, 1979/80–1983/84
- Rowland Holle, 1883/84–1886/87
- Alfred Hollings, 1926/27–1929/30
- William Holmes, 1882/83–1883/84
- Raymond Hope, 1928/29–1929/30
- Brian Hopkins, 1966/67
- Adam Hose, 2018/19
- David Hosking, 1967/68
- Stephen Hotter, 1988/89–1999/00
- Mark Houghton, 2006/07–2012/13
- Alan Hounsell, 1972/73
- Arthur Howard, 1895/96–1897/98
- Gilbert Howe, 1913/14
- Glynn Howell, 2001/02
- RJ Hunter, 1884/85 (Note: Hunter played in a single match for Wellington in the 1884–85 season. No biographical details are known.)
- John Hutchings, 1903/04–1924/25
- Dane Hutchinson, 2012/13–2015/16
- Neville Huxford, 1964/65–1966/67

== I ==
- William Ingle, 1879/80
- Ernest Izard, 1890/91–1894/95

== J ==
- Edwin Jacobs, 1873/74
- Sydney Jacobs, 1899/00
- Ken James, 1923/24–1946/47
- Kevan James, 1982/83–1984/85
- Michael James, 1964/65
- Paul Jarvis, 1996/97
- Mark Jefferson, 1996/97–2002/03
- Robin Jefferson, 1969/70
- Lauchie Johns, 2017/18–2022/23
- Brett Johnson, 2019/20
- Troy Johnson, 2018/19–2024/25
- Glenn Jonas, 1993/94–1997/98
- Andrew Jones, 1985/86–1993/94
- C Jones, 1944/45 (Note: Jones played in a single match for Wellington in the 1944–45 season. No biographical details are known.)
- Jim Jones, 1950/51–1953/54
- Richard Jones, 2000/01–2003/04
- Deepak Joon, 2014/15
- Frank Joplin, 1913/14
- William Judd, 1886/87

== K ==
- Ronald Karaitiana, 2008/09–2011/12
- Russell Kean, 1976/77–1977/78
- Simon Kellett, 1991/92
- Jim Kelly, 1950/51
- Leigh Kelly, 1998/99
- Nick Kelly, 2022/23–2025/26
- Jimmy Kemp, 1945/46–1949/50
- Robert Kennedy, 1998/99–1999/00
- William Kennedy, 1877/78–1883/84
- Robbie Kerr, 1993/94–1997/98
- Gordon Kinvig, 1909/10
- James Kirkcaldie, 1903/04
- William Kirker, 1887/88–1893/94
- Charles Knapp, 1873/74–1884/85
- Edmund Knapp, 1943/44–1944/45
- Bert Kortlang, 1922/23–1926/27
- Charles Kreeft, 1882/83
- Gustave Kuchen, 1880/81
- Scott Kuggeleijn, 2011/12–2012/13
- Dhawal Kulkarni, 2008/09

== L ==
- Jack Lamason, 1927/28–1946/47
- Andrew Lamb, 2008/09–2011/12
- Herb Lambert, 1917/18–1932/33
- Mark Lane, 1990/91–1991/92
- Gavin Larsen, 1984/85–1998/99
- Frederick Lash, 1893/94–1896/97
- JK Latham, 1903/04 (Note: Latham played in a single match for Wellington in the 1903–04 season. No biographical details are known.)
- James Lawrence, 1873/74
- Frederick Laws, 1896/97–1909/10
- Henry Lawson, 1883/84–1889/90
- Brett Lee, 2010/11
- Chris Lee, 1991/92–1992/93
- Adam Leonard, 2022/23
- Charles Levers, 1895/96–1896/97
- David Little, 1998/99
- Douglas Little, 1911/12 (Note: Little played in a single match for Wellington in the 1911–12 season. No biographical details are known.)
- John Little, 1947/48
- Alexander Littlejohn, 1887/88–1889/90
- John Lockett, 1874/75–1877/78
- George Lowe, 1873/74–1874/75
- Tom Lowry, 1926/27–1932/33
- Martin Luckie, 1891/92–1919/20
- Harold Lusk, 1917/18
- Frank Luxford, 1880/81–1883/84
- Robert Lynch, 1873/74–1883/84

== M ==
- C McCarthy, 1941/42 (Note: McCarthy played in a single match for Wellington in the 1941–42 season. No biographical details are known.)
- Edward McCausland, 1985/86
- Malcolm McCaw, 1952/53
- Kieran McComb, 2021/22–2022/23
- George McConnell, 1960/61–1971/72
- Bob McCullough, 1971/72
- William McDermid, 1906/07
- Henry Mace, 1877/78
- Matt McEwan, 2014/15–2016/17
- Herb McGirr, 1913/14–1932/33
- William McGirr, 1883/84–1889/90
- Peter McGregor, 1968/69–1976/77
- Scott McHardy, 1993/94–1997/98
- Colin McIntosh, 1914/15
- Patrick McIntyre, 1887/88
- Andy McKay, 2009/10–2013/14
- Arnaud McKellar, 1919/20
- Greg Mackenzie, 1990/91–1992/93
- Henry McKenzie, 1876/77
- Robert McKenzie, 1929/30
- Jimmy McKeown, 1938/39–1954/55
- Callum McLachlan, 2021/22–2025/26
- Alan McLean, 1947/48
- George McLellan, 1965/66–1967/68
- Donald MacLeod, 1958/59
- Eddie McLeod, 1925/26–1940/41
- Phil McMahon, 1994/95
- Trevor McMahon, 1953/54–1964/65
- George McMaster, 1891/92
- Iain McPeake, 2015/16–2024/25
- Ervin McSweeney, 1981/82–1993/94
- Stuart McVicar, 1943/44–1950/51
- Steve Maguiness, 1981/82–1987/88
- Jeremiah Mahoney, 1902/03–1911/12
- Thomas Malcolm, 1885/86
- Pat Malcon, 1972/73
- Trevor Malloch, 1953/54
- Charles Mansill, 1882/83
- John Marchant, 1873/74–1881/82
- Brian Marris, 1917/18–1919/20
- Hamish Marshall, 2016/17–2017/18
- Kevin Marshall, 1983/84
- Dimitri Mascarenhas, 2012/13
- Ian Mason, 1960/61–1965/66
- Walter Mason, 1873/74–1875/76
- Bruce Massey, 1926/27–1932/33
- Stephen Mather, 1993/94–2000/01
- Mal Matheson, 1944/45–1946/47
- Nicholas Meadows, 1980/81
- Trevor Meale, 1951/52–1953/54
- Max Meech, 1946/47
- Robert Menzies, 1941/42–1946/47
- Cameron Merchant, 2009/10–2010/11
- Brent Middleton, 1973/74
- Frederick Middleton, 1919/20–1921/22
- Frederick Midlane, 1898/99–1914/15
- Charles Miles, 1883/84
- Lawrie Miller, 1954/55–1959/60
- Jonathan Millmow, 1986/87–1991/92
- Stu Mills, 2003/04–2006/07
- Adam Milne, 2022/23–2024/25
- James Milne, 1985/86–1987/88
- Errol Mitchell, 1926/27
- Sonny Moloney, 1935/36–1937/38
- David Molony, 1985/86–1993/94
- Harold Monaghan, 1905/06–1910/11
- Frank Mooney, 1941/42–1954/55
- Claude Moore, 1919/20
- Malcolm Moorhouse, 1886/87–1890/91
- Andrew Morey, 1888/89
- Harry Morgan, 1963/64–1977/78
- Leighton Morgan, 2000/01–2002/03
- Rhys Morgan, 2000/01–2001/02
- Rurie Morgan, 1932/33–1940/41
- Francis Morice, 1886/87–1889/90
- Bruce Morrison, 1953/54–1964/65
- James Morrison, 1958/59–1959/60
- John Morrison, 1967/68–1983/84
- James Moss, 1969/70
- Robert Moss, 1903/04
- Arthur Motley, 1886/87–1888/89
- William Mowatt, 1903/04
- Cedric Muir, 1943/44
- Travis Muller, 2017/18
- Muttiah Muralitharan, 2011/12
- Stephen Murdoch, 2008/09–2017/18
- Bruce Murray, 1958/59–1972/73
- Graham Murray, 2004/05
- Ron Murray, 1946/47–1950/51
- John Murtagh, 1991/92
- Sam Mycock, 2024/25–2025/26

== N ==
- Graham Napier, 2007/08–2013/14
- JA Nash, 1929/30 (Note: Nash played in a single match for Wellington in the 1919–20 season. No biographical details are known.)
- Anup Nathu, 1987/88
- Don Naughton, 1908/09–1911/12
- Michael Naughton, 1897/98
- Don Neely, 1964/65–1967/68
- Jimmy Neesham, 2018/19–2021/22
- Chris Nevin, 1995/96–2010/11
- Jim Newbigin, 1953/54
- Graham Newdick, 1970/71–1980/81
- Alex Newman, 1930/31
- Jack Newman, 1930/31–1935/36
- Stanley Newman, 1929/30
- Ollie Newton, 2015/16–2023/24
- Robbie Newton, 1974/75
- Sydney Nicholls, 1882/83–1893/94
- Ming Nightingale, 1950/51–1958/59
- Robert Niven, 1890/91–1901/02
- Malcolm Nofal, 2017/18–2019/20
- William Norris, 1940/41

== O ==
- David Oakley, 1980/81–1984/85
- John Oakley, 1946/47
- Iain O'Brien, 2000/01–2009/10
- Matt O'Brien, 1932/33–1941/42
- Luke O'Connor, 1876/77
- William Ogier, 1889/90–1891/92
- John Ogilvie, 1953/54–1963/64
- Thomas O'Neil, 1965/66
- Raymond O'Neil, 1944/45–1951/52
- Joe Ongley, 1938/39–1949/50
- Ian Ormiston, 1987/88
- Ross Ormiston, 1980/81–1985/86
- Paddy O'Rourke, 1989/90–1992/93
- George Orr, 1923/24–1926/27
- Ben Orton, 2012/13
- Harold Osborn, 1940/41–1941/42

== P ==
- David Paetz, 1966/67
- H Page, 1895/96 (Note: Page played in two matches for Wellington in the 1895–96 season. No biographical details are known.)
- Joseph Page, 1879/80–1880/81
- Arthur Palethorpe, 1879/80
- Michael Papps, 2011/12–2017/18
- Kenneth Parkin, 1945/46
- Michael Parlane, 2003/04–2007/08
- Neal Parlane, 2002/03–2010/11
- Henry Parrington, 1875/76
- Cyril Parsloe, 1932/33–1940/41
- Jonathan Parson, 1961/62
- Mayu Pasupati, 1997/98–2004/05
- Brijesh Patel, 1978/79
- Jeetan Patel, 1999/00–2019/20
- Samit Patel, 2017/18
- Alex Paterson, 1914/15 (Note: Paterson played in two matches for Wellington in the 1914–15 season as a wicket-keeper. He was born in 1887 or 1888 and died, aged 43, at Brooklyn in Wellington in 1931.)
- David Patrick, 1907/08–1921/22
- Eustace Payne, 1908/09
- Andrew Penn, 2000/01–2003/04
- Bill Perkins, 1952/53–1953/54
- Peter Petherick, 1978/79–1980/81
- Richard Petrie, 1993/94–2000/01
- Edgar Phillips, 1911/12–1920/21
- Ronald Phillips, 1947/48 (Note: Phillips, who was born in 1926, played in a single match for Wellington in the 1947–48 season, making scores of 15 and 67 against Fiji. He also played Hawke Cup cricket for South Canterbury between the 1954–55 season and 1960–61. He died at Melbourne in Australia in 1978.)
- Andy Pick, 1989/90
- Chris Pickett, 1983/84
- Tony Pigott, 1982/83–1983/84
- Richard Pither, 1976/77–1984/85
- Michael Pollard, 2009/10–2019/20
- Alan Preston, 1955/56–1962/63
- Edward Prideaux, 1885/86
- Horace Prince, 1923/24–1924/25
- Tom Pritchard, 1937/38–1940/41

== Q ==
- Fraser Quarterman, 2007/08
- William Quee, 1899/00–1904/05
- John Quinn, 1913/14

== R ==
- Geoff Rabone, 1940/41–1950/51
- Bill Rainbird, 1934/35–1946/47
- Mick Randall, 1948/49–1950/51
- Scott Rasmussen, 2005/06–2006/07
- Rachin Ravindra, 2018/19–2024/25
- Robert Read, 1899/00–1900/01
- Henry Reaney, 1932/33
- Tom Reaney, 1927/28–1948/49
- William Redgrave, 1903/04–1905/06
- Rodney Redmond, 1966/67–1967/68
- John Reid, 1947/48–1964/65
- Richard Reid, 1979/80–1991/92
- Rodney Reid, 1958/59–1960/61
- Joseph Renner, 1882/83
- Barry Rhodes, 2011/12
- Stewart Rhodes, 2009/10–2011/12
- Herbert Rice, 1937/38–1945/46
- Charles Richardson, 1897/98–1906/07
- Alec Riddolls, 1941/42
- Alex Ridley, 2017/18
- Archibald Rigg, 1884/85
- Jim Riley, 1970/71–1971/72
- Les Riley, 1934/35
- Tim Ritchie, 1982/83–1990/91
- Alexander Roberts, 1959/60–1963/64
- Andrew Roberts, 1993/94
- Edward Roberts, 1909/10
- Harry Roberts, 1882/83–1889/90
- Frederick Robertson, 1898/99–1901/02
- Charles Robinson, 1911/12–1914/15
- M Robinson, 1877/78 (Note: Robinson played in a single match for Wellington in the 1877–78 season. No biographical details are known.)
- Tim Robinson, 2021/22–2025/26
- Jack Rodgers, 1908/09–1914/15
- Fred Rogers, 1941/42
- Tony Rohrs, 1987/88
- Richard Romanos, 1951/52
- Alan Ronaldson, 1922/23
- Thomas Ronaldson, 1883/84
- Luke Ronchi, 2011/12–2017/18
- W Rose, 1885/86 (Note: Rose played in a single match for Wellington in the 1885–86 season. No biographical details are known.)
- Bertie Ross, 1929/30–1935/36
- Jonathan Ross, 1975/76
- Ricky Rotch, 1993/94
- Gerard Rotherham, 1928/29
- Gordon Rowe, 1944/45–1945/46
- Bernie Rule, 1982/83
- Thorn Russ, 1940/41–1945/46
- Jesse Ryder, 2004/05–2012/13

== S ==
- Doug St John, 1946/47–1950/51
- David Sales, 2001/02
- Isaac Salmon, 1873/74–1881/82
- James Salmon, 1873/74–1880/81
- William Salmon, 1873/74–1889/90
- B Samuels, 1919/20 (Note: Samuels played in a single match for Wellington in the 1919–20 season. No biographical details are known.)
- Jack Saunders, 1910/11–1913/14
- Robbie Schaw, 2009/10
- George Schmoll, 1910/11–1912/13
- Jeff Schofer, 1969/70
- Phil Schofer, 1983/84
- Eric Schrader, 1919/20
- Ben Sears, 2018/19–2024/25
- Mike Sears, 1990/91–1993/94
- Brian Sergent, 1951/52–1952/53
- Gareth Severin, 2022/23–2025/26
- Owais Shah, 2009/10
- Roy Sheffield, 1938/39
- Charlie Shreck, 2005/06–2007/08
- John Sigley, 1959/60–1960/61
- Barry Sinclair, 1955/56–1971/72
- Bruce Smith, 1966/67–1976/77
- Keith Smith, 1953/54–1954/56
- Nathan Smith, 2021/22–2024/25
- Percy Smith, 1909/10
- Robert Smith, 1968/69–1976/77
- Edward Smyrk, 1913/14–1919/20
- Michael Snedden, 2019/20–2025/26
- Gary Snowden, 1968/69
- Gary Solomon, 1966/67
- Thomas Southall, 1912/13–1914/15
- James Speed, 1877/78–1879/80
- Martin Speight, 1989/90–1995/96
- Jack Standidge, 1940/41
- Paul Standidge, 1957/58
- Dick Staples, 1901/02–1903/04
- Frederick Stephenson, 1891/92–1904/05
- Derek Stirling, 1988/89–1992/93
- Ian Storkey, 1975/76
- Gilbert Stringer, 1943/44
- Ivo Symes, 1934/35–1935/36

== T ==
- Shaun Tait, 2012/13–2013/14
- Tamim Iqbal, 2012/13
- John Tarleton, 1884/85
- Jessie Tashkoff, 2022/23–2025/26
- Henry Tattersall, 1922/23–1927/28
- Arch Taylor, 1963/64–1965/66
- Brendan Taylor, 2011/12
- Bruce Taylor, 1970/71–1980/81
- Frank Taylor, 1889/90–1890/91
- Joseph Taylor, 1927/28
- Matt Taylor, 2013/14–2017/18
- Ian Therkleson, 1966/67–1973/74
- M Thomas, 1937/38 (Note: Thomas played in a single match for Wellington in the 1937–38 season. No biographical details are known.)
- Jim Thomson, 1953/54
- Jim Tilyard, 1907/08
- Eric Tindill, 1932/33–1949/50
- Paul Tindill, 1965/66
- John Topp, 1978/79
- Bill Tricklebank, 1934/35–1936/37
- Peter Truscott, 1964/65–1965/66
- Kinder Tucker, 1895/96–1919/20
- Spencer Tucker, 1892/93–1896/97
- Bertie Tuckwell, 1917/18
- Ili Tugaga, 2008/09–2014/15
- Ash Turner, 2001/02–2004/05
- Charles Twist, 1882/83–1883/84
- Roger Twose, 1994/95–2000/01
- Jack Tynan, 1951/52–1953/54

== U ==
- Ernest Upham, 1892/93–1909/10
- Kenneth Uttley, 1951/52

== V ==
- Toivo Vaikvee, 1973/74–1975/76
- Logan van Beek, 2017/18–2025/26
- Bob Vance, 1947/48–1961/62
- Robert Vance, 1976/77–1990/91
- Anurag Verma, 2015/16–2017/18
- Ross Verry, 1985/86–1992/93
- Matt Verrall 1996/97
- Richard Vincent, 1886/87
- Robert Virtue, 1891/92
- Devan Vishvaka, 2021/22–2022/23
- Tim Vogel, 1980/81–1983/84

== W ==
- WJ Wagstaffe, 1913/14–1919/20
- Matthew Walker, 1999/00–2003/04
- Henry Walsh, 2013/14–2014/15
- Syd Ward, 1929/30–1937/38
- Clement Wareham, 1934/35
- William Warne, 1919/20–1920/21 (Note: Warne played in five matches for Wellington, one in 1919–20 and the remaining four during the 1920–21 season. A wicket-keeper, he scored 212 runs with a highest score of 55 made against Hawke's Bay on debut. No biographical details are known.)
- Walter Warren, 1894/95–1896/97
- Victor Waters, 1895/96–1905/06
- Harold Watson, 1923/24
- George Webb, 1879/80–1896/97
- Scott Weenink, 1995/96–1996/97
- Graham Welch, 1997/98
- Jason Wells, 1989/90–2000/01
- Nathaniel Werry, 1873/74–1883/84
- Regan West, 2000/01
- Bernard Weyburne, 1896/97–1905/06
- Graeme Wheeler, 1981/82
- Glen White, 1998/99
- Harold White, 1923/24
- Bob Whyte, 1934/35
- Gordon Whyte, 1939/40
- Glenn Wilkinson, 1996/97
- Arnold Williams, 1896/97–1909/10
- Brett Williams, 1987/88–1995/96
- Junior Williams, 1981/82
- Lindsay Williams, 1951/52–1953/54
- Owen Williams, 1884/85
- A Willis, 1946/47 (Note: Willis played in a single match for Wellington in the 1946–47 season. No biographical details are known.)
- Andy Wilson, 1979/80
- Benjamin Wilson, 1892/93
- Charles Wilson, 1912/13–1919/20
- David Wilson, 1935/36–1948/49
- JH Wilson, 1883/84–1885/86 (Note: Wilson played in three matches for Wellington, one in each of the seasons between 1883–84 and 1885–86. After scores of seven and 65 on debut against Hawke's Bay, he recorded ducks in each of his other innings. No biographical details are known.)
- Peter Wilson, 1940/41
- Andy Wiren, 1945/46
- Chris Woakes, 2012/13
- James Wood, 1882/83–1883/84
- John Wood, 1873/74
- Luke Woodcock, 2001/02–2018/19
- Rupert Worker, 1926/27–1929/30
- Damien Wright, 2010/11
- Ernest Wright, 1898/99–1900/01
- Luke Wright, 2010/11
- Oscar Wrigley, 1939/40–1940/41
- William Wynyard, 1890/91–1907/08

== Y ==
- Peter Younghusband, 2014/15–2025/26

== Z ==
- Spiro Zavos, 1958/59
- Yahya Zeb, 2024/25

== Bibliography ==
- McCarron, Tony (2010). New Zealand Cricketers 1863/64–2010. Cardiff: The Association of Cricket Statisticians and Historians. ISBN 978 1 905138 98 2
