= Philip Newman (cricketer) =

New Zealand cricketer

Personal information
- Full name: Philip Alfred Newman
- Born: 24 August 1937; Nelson, New Zealand
- Died: 25 December 2025 (aged 88)
- Batting: Right-handed
- Relatives: Alex Newman (father); Jack Newman (uncle); Stanley Newman (uncle)

Domestic team information
- Years: Team
- 1958/59: Central Districts
- Source: Cricinfo, 29 October 2020

Philip Alfred Newman (24 August 1937 – 25 December 2025) was a New Zealand cricketer. He played in two first-class matches for Central Districts in 1958/59.

Newman died on 25 December 2025 at the age of 88.

== See also ==
- List of Central Districts representative cricketers
