= M. Dind =

New Zealand cricketer

Personal information
- Born: 1879; Queensland, Australia
- Died: 30 January 1946 (aged 66–67); Wellington, New Zealand
- Source: Cricinfo, 24 October 2020

M. Dind (1879 – 30 January 1946) was a New Zealand cricketer. He played in eleven first-class matches for Wellington from 1917 to 1920.

Newspapers of the day have numerous references to an M. J. Dind, left-handed batsman playing for Wellington from December 1918, when he and Arthur Fenton replaced Ernest Beechey and Bertie Tuckwell for a match against Canterbury, to January 1920 when Wellington played Auckland. He was subsequently player and vice-president of the Midland Cricket Club.

== See also ==
- List of Wellington representative cricketers
