= Adrian Griffiths =

Adrian Griffiths may refer to:

- Adrian Griffiths (Welsh cricketer) (born 1959)
- Adrian Griffiths (New Zealand cricketer) (born 1951)

== See also ==
- Adrian Griffith (disambiguation)
