= Robert Moss (disambiguation) =

Robert Moss (born 1946) is a historian and author.

Robert Moss may also refer to:

- Robert Moss (priest) (1666–1729), English churchman and controversialist
- Robert Moss (New Zealand cricketer) (1884–1932)
- Robert Moss (English cricketer) (1914–1977), English cricketer and British Indian Army officer
- Bobby Moss (1952–2010), English footballer
- Robb Moss, documentary filmmaker
