= Harold Chapman =

Harold Chapman may refer to:

- Harold Chapman (photographer) (1927–2022), British photographer noted for chronicling the 1950s in Paris
- Harold Chapman (orthodontist) (1881–1965), England's first exclusive Orthodontic practitioner
- Harold Chapman (cricketer) (1922–2007), New Zealand cricketer
- Harold Chapman (rugby league), rugby league footballer of the 1920s and 1930s who played for Castleford
- Harold Chapman (footballer), association footballer who played for New Zealand
