= Stanley Newman =

Stanley Newman may refer to:

- Stanley Newman (cricketer) (1907–1956), New Zealand cricketer
- Stanley Newman (puzzle creator) (born 1952), American puzzle creator
- Stanley Newman (snooker player) (1900–1947), English snooker player
