= John Bryce (disambiguation) =

John Bryce (1833–1913) was a New Zealand politician.

John Bryce may also refer to:

- John Bryce (cricketer) (1949–1878), New Zealand cricketer
- John Bryce (producer) (born 1934), Scottish television producer
- John Annan Bryce (1841–1923), Scottish businessman and Liberal politician
