= Palethorpe =

Palethorpe is a surname. Notable people with the surname include:

- Arthur Palethorpe (1854–1916), New Zealand cricketer
- Jack Palethorpe (1909–1984), British footballer
- Phillip Palethorpe (born 1986), British footballer
- Henry Paleothorpe, founder of Palethorpes
