= James Dees =

James Dees may refer to:

- James Parker Dees, founder and first bishop of the Orthodox Anglican Church and the Orthodox Anglican Communion
- James Dees (cricketer), English cricketer

== See also ==
- Jack Dee (James Andrew Innes Dee), English stand-up comedian and actor
