= Gary Solomon =

Gary Solomon may refer to:

- Gary Solomon (New Zealand cricketer), New Zealand cricketer
- Gary Solomon (Sint Maarten cricketer), Sint Maarten cricketer
