= John Tarleton =

John Tarleton is the name of:

- John Tarleton (slave trader) (1718–1773), English ship-owner and slave-trader, Mayor of Liverpool in 1764, father of John Tarleton (MP)
- John Tarleton (MP) (1755–1841), English ship-owner, slave-trader and politician, son of John Tarleton (slave trader)
- John Tarleton (Royal Navy officer) (1811–1880), admiral and Second Sea Lord
- John Tarleton (American settler) (ca. 1808–1895), American rancher best known for endowing what became Tarleton State University
- John Tarleton (cricketer) (1852-1929), New Zealand cricketer
