= Quee =

Quee is the surname of the following notable people:

- Choo Seng Quee (1914–1983), Singaporean football player
- Chung Keng Quee (1821–1901), Malaysian businessman
- Kwame Quee (born 1996), Sierra Leonean football midfielder
- Richard Chee Quee (born 1971), Australian first-class cricketer
- Seah Jim Quee, Malaysian landowner
- William Quee (1877–1920), New Zealand cricketer
