= Jeremy Dean =

Jeremy Dean may refer to:

- Jeremy Dean (cricketer)
- Jeremy Dean (politician)
- Jeremy Dean, member of the band Nine Days

== See also ==
- Jeremy Dein, English barrister
