= Walter Chisholm =

Walter Chisholm may refer to:

- Walter Scott Chisholm (1836–1890), American lawyer
- Walter Chisholm (cricketer) (1862–1957), New Zealand cricketer
