= Frederick Rogers =

Frederick Rogers may refer to:

- Sir Frederick Rogers, 5th Baronet (1746–1797), of the Rogers baronets, British politician, MP for Plymouth
- Frederic Rogers, 1st Baron Blachford (1811–1889), British civil servant
- Frederick Rogers (bookbinder) (1846–1915), English bookbinder, writer and trades unionist
- Frederick Arundel Rogers (1876–1944), English Anglican archdeacon and amateur botanist
- Frederick Rand Rogers (1894–1972), American educator
- Fred Rogers (American football) (fl. 1890s), American college football coach
- Fred Rogers (footballer) (1910–?), English footballer
- Fred Rogers (1928–2003), American educator, clergyman, songwriter, author, and television host
  - Fred Rogers Productions, American nonprofit started by Fred Rogers
- Fred Rogers (speedway rider) (1929–2001), English speedway rider
- Fred Rogers (cricketer) (1918–1998), New Zealand cricketer

== See also ==
- Frederick Rodgers (1842–1917), officer in the United States Navy
- Rogers (surname)
