= James Salmond =

James Salmond may refer to:

- James Salmond (East India Company officer) (1766–1837), officer in the East India Company's forces
- James Salmond (minister) (1898–1976), New Zealand teacher, Presbyterian minister and religious educationalist
- Louis Salmond (James Louis Salmond, 1868–1950), English-born architect active in New Zealand
- J. B. Salmond (James Bell Salmond, 1891–1958), Scottish journalist, poet and novelist

== See also ==
- James Salmon (disambiguation)
