= Wallace Bain =

Wallace Bain may refer to:

- Wallace Bain (cricketer), (1917–2005), New Zealand cricketer
- Wallace Bain (mayor), New Zealand mayor and coroner
