= George Day =

George Day may refer to:

- George Day (bishop) (c. 1501–1556), Bishop of Chichester, 1543–1551, and vice-chancellor of the University of Cambridge in 1537
- George Day (Australian politician) (1826–1906), member of the New South Wales Parliament
- George Day (cricketer) (1879–1953), New Zealand cricketer
- George A. Day (1859–1927), justice of the Nebraska Supreme Court
- George C. Day (1871–1940), U.S. Navy rear admiral
- Bud Day (George E. Day, 1925–2013), U.S. Air Force colonel, Medal of Honor recipient
- George Edward Day (1815–1872), Welsh physician
- George Fiott Day (1820–1876), Royal Navy captain, Victoria Cross recipient
- George Lawrence Day, alias of John Mapes Adams (1871–1921), United States Marine and Medal of Honor recipient
- George S. Day, marketing specialist in the 1970s
- George T. Day, Free Will Baptist writer, publisher, pastor and professor
