= James Morrison (cricketer) =

New Zealand cricketer (1936–2018)

Personal information
- Born: 24 March 1936; Wellington, New Zealand
- Died: 4 August 2018 (aged 82)
- Source: Cricinfo, 27 October 2020

James Morrison (24 March 1936 – 4 August 2018) was a New Zealand cricketer. He played in three first-class matches for Wellington from 1958 to 1960.

== See also ==
- List of Wellington representative cricketers
