= Clement Wareham =

New Zealand cricketer

Personal information
- Full name: Clement Patrick Stephen Wareham
- Born: 23 March 1911; Wellington, New Zealand
- Died: 30 September 1940 (aged 29); Hollingbourne, Kent, England
- Role: Batsman

Domestic team information
- Years: Team
- 1934–35: Wellington
- Source: Cricinfo, 27 October 2020

Clement Patrick Stephen Wareham (23 March 1911 – 30 September 1940) was a New Zealand cricketer. He played in two first-class matches for Wellington in the 1934–35 Plunket Shield season, but without success.

Wareham enlisted for duty in the New Zealand armed forces at the outset of World War II. While serving in England in September 1940 he died when he was struck by a car while crossing a road. A month earlier he had top-scored with 50 for a New Zealand Expeditionary Force XI in a victory over an Australian Imperial Forces XI in a one-day match at Aldershot.

== See also ==
- List of Wellington representative cricketers
