= Thomas Creeks =

New Zealand cricketer

Personal information
- Born: 1859
- Died: 27 September 1917 (aged 57–58); Auckland, New Zealand
- Source: Cricinfo, 24 October 2020

Thomas Creeks (1859 – 27 September 1917) was a New Zealand cricketer. He played in one first-class match for Wellington in 1886/87.

== See also ==
- List of Wellington representative cricketers
