= George McMaster =

New Zealand cricketer

Personal information
- Born: 1862; Amherst, Victoria, Australia
- Died: 14 September 1944 (aged 81–82); Wellington, New Zealand
- Source: Cricinfo, 24 October 2020

George McMaster (1862 – 14 September 1944) was a New Zealand cricketer. He played in one first-class match for Wellington in 1891/92.

== See also ==
- List of Wellington representative cricketers
