= Paul Standidge =

New Zealand cricketer (1934–2026)

Personal information
- Full name: Paul Harry Standidge
- Born: 1 April 1934; Wellington, New Zealand
- Died: 21 April 2026 (aged 92); Cairns, Queensland, Australia
- Relatives: Jack Standidge (father)
- Source: Cricinfo, 27 October 2020

Paul Harry Standidge (1 April 1934 – 21 April 2026) was a New Zealand cricketer. He played in four first-class matches for Wellington in 1957/58.

Standidge died in Cairns, Queensland, Australia on 21 April 2026, at the age of 92.

== See also ==
- List of Wellington representative cricketers
