= Alfred Duncan (cricketer) =

New Zealand cricketer

Personal information
- Born: 8 January 1895; Wellington, New Zealand
- Died: 21 January 1975 (aged 80); Wellington, New Zealand
- Source: Cricinfo, 24 October 2020

Alfred Duncan (8 January 1895 – 21 January 1975) was a New Zealand cricketer. He played in two first-class matches for Wellington in 1919–20.

== See also ==
- List of Wellington representative cricketers
