= Samuel O'Neill =

New Zealand cricketer

Personal information
- Full name: Samuel Raymond O'Neill
- Born: 1 August 1912; Waihi, New Zealand
- Died: 18 July 1983 (aged 70); Wellington, New Zealand
- Source: Cricinfo, 27 October 2020

Samuel O'Neill (1 August 1912 – 18 July 1983) was a New Zealand cricketer. He played in eleven first-class matches for Wellington from 1944 to 1952.

== See also ==
- List of Wellington representative cricketers
