= Greg Mackenzie =

New Zealand cricketer (born 1967)

Personal information
- Born: 7 December 1967 (age 58); Brisbane, Australia
- Source: Cricinfo, 24 October 2020

Greg Mackenzie (born 7 December 1967) is a New Zealand cricketer. He played in seventeen first-class matches for Wellington from 1990 to 1993.

== See also ==
- List of Wellington representative cricketers
