= Keith Hatch =

New Zealand cricketer

Personal information
- Born: 2 July 1916; Marton, New Zealand
- Died: 30 October 2007 (aged 91); Wellington, New Zealand
- Source: Cricinfo, 24 October 2020

Keith Hatch (2 July 1916 – 30 October 2007) was a New Zealand cricketer. He played in five first-class matches for Wellington in 1945/46.

== See also ==
- List of Wellington representative cricketers
