= Tim Boyer =

New Zealand cricketer (born 1971)

Personal information
- Born: 11 August 1971 (age 55); Wellington, New Zealand
- Source: Cricinfo, 23 October 2020

Tim Boyer (born 11 August 1971) is a New Zealand cricketer. He played in thirteen first-class and sixteen List A matches for Wellington from 1997 to 2000.

== See also ==
- List of Wellington representative cricketers
