= Charles Cornish (cricketer) =

New Zealand cricketer

Personal information
- Born: 1850; Windsor, England
- Died: 27 November 1917 (aged 66–67); Auckland, New Zealand
- Source: Cricinfo, 24 October 2020

Charles Cornish (1850 – 27 November 1917) was a New Zealand cricketer. He played in one first-class match for Wellington in 1874/75.

== See also ==
- List of Wellington representative cricketers
