= Frederick Robertson (New Zealand cricketer) =

New Zealand cricketer

Personal information
- Born: 18 May 1878; Paris, France
- Died: 17 September 1966 (aged 88); Auckland, New Zealand
- Source: Cricinfo, 27 October 2020

Frederick Robertson (18 May 1878 – 17 September 1966) was a New Zealand cricketer. He played in eight first-class matches for Wellington from 1897 to 1902.

== See also ==
- List of Wellington representative cricketers
