= Richard Pither =

New Zealand cricketer (born 1954)

Personal information
- Born: 23 February 1954 (age 72); Christchurch, New Zealand
- Source: Cricinfo, 27 October 2020

Richard Pither (born 23 February 1954) is a New Zealand cricketer. He played in eight first-class and five List A matches for Wellington from 1976 and 1985.

== See also ==
- List of Wellington representative cricketers
