= James Wood (New Zealand cricketer) =

New Zealand cricketer

Personal information
- Born: 19 January 1854; Calcutta, India
- Died: 8 September 1937 (aged 83); Nelson, New Zealand
- Source: Cricinfo, 27 October 2020

James William Harrington Wood (19 January 1854 – 8 September 1937) was a New Zealand cricketer. He played in nine first-class matches for Wellington and Hawke's Bay from 1882 to 1887.

== See also ==
- List of Wellington representative cricketers
