= John Hamilton (cricketer) =

English cricketer

Personal information
- Born: 1855; Exeter, England
- Died: 1904 (aged 48–49); Salford, England
- Source: Cricinfo, 24 October 2020

John Hamilton (1855–1904) was an English cricketer. He played in two first-class matches in New Zealand for Wellington from 1877 to 1880.

== See also ==
- List of Wellington representative cricketers
