= Luke O'Connor (cricketer) =

New Zealand cricketer

Personal information
- Born: c. 1844
- Died: 29 May 1927 (aged 82–83); Wellington, New Zealand
- Source: Cricinfo, 27 October 2020

Luke O'Connor (c. 1844 – 29 May 1927) was a New Zealand cricketer. He played in one first-class match for Wellington in 1876/77.

== See also ==
- List of Wellington representative cricketers
