= Lee Edwards (cricketer) =

New Zealand cricketer (born 1979)

Personal information
- Born: 21 April 1979 (age 47); Wellington, New Zealand
- Source: Cricinfo, 24 October 2020

Lee Edwards (born 21 April 1979) was a New Zealand cricketer. He played in six first-class matches for Wellington from 1998 to 2010.

== See also ==
- List of Wellington representative cricketers
