= Arthur Birch (cricketer) =

New Zealand cricketer (1888–1976)

Personal information
- Born: 23 January 1888; Wellington, New Zealand
- Died: 16 June 1976 (aged 88); Wellington, New Zealand
- Source: Cricinfo, 23 October 2020

Arthur Birch (23 January 1888 – 16 June 1976) was a New Zealand cricketer. He played in two first-class matches for Wellington from 1909 to 1911.

== See also ==
- List of Wellington representative cricketers
