= Richard Gilhooly =

New Zealand cricketer (born 1979)

Personal information
- Born: 26 March 1979 (age 47); Hastings, New Zealand
- Source: Cricinfo, 24 October 2020

Richard Gilhooly (born 26 March 1979) is a New Zealand cricketer. He played in one first-class match for Wellington in 2005.

== See also ==
- List of Wellington representative cricketers
