= Joseph Haughton =

New Zealand cricketer (1833–1908)

Personal information
- Born: 1833; Plymouth, England
- Died: 27 May 1908 (aged 74–75); Roxburgh, New Zealand
- Source: Cricinfo, 24 October 2020

Joseph Haughton (1833 – 27 May 1908) was a New Zealand cricketer. He played in one first-class match for Wellington in 1876/77.

== See also ==
- List of Wellington representative cricketers
