= Wilfred Hepburn =

New Zealand cricketer

Personal information
- Born: 25 August 1910; Wellington, New Zealand
- Died: 7 September 1973 (aged 63); Wellington, New Zealand
- Source: Cricinfo, 24 October 2020

Wilfred Hepburn (25 August 1910 – 7 September 1973) was a New Zealand cricketer. He played in seven first-class matches for Wellington from 1931 to 1941.

== See also ==
- List of Wellington representative cricketers
