= Jimmy McKeown =

New Zealand cricketer

Personal information
- Born: 2 March 1916; Wellington, New Zealand
- Died: 9 April 1976 (aged 60); Wellington, New Zealand
- Source: Cricinfo, 24 October 2020

Jimmy McKeown (2 March 1916 – 9 April 1976) was a New Zealand cricketer. He played in five first-class matches for Wellington from 1938 to 1955.

== See also ==
- List of Wellington representative cricketers
