= Stean Hainsworth =

New Zealand cricketer (born 1965)

Personal information
- Born: 22 December 1965 (age 60); Upper Hutt, New Zealand
- Source: Cricinfo, 24 October 2020

Stean Hainsworth (born 22 December 1965) is a New Zealand cricketer. He played in one first-class match for Wellington in 1988/89.

== See also ==
- List of Wellington representative cricketers
