= Mike Sears =

New Zealand cricketer (born 1967)

Personal information
- Born: 28 February 1967 (age 59); Auckland, New Zealand
- Source: Cricinfo, 27 October 2020

Mike Sears (born 28 February 1967) is a New Zealand cricketer. He played in twenty first-class and thirteen List A matches for Wellington from 1990 to 1994.

== See also ==
- List of Wellington representative cricketers
