= Henry Reaney =

New Zealand cricketer

Personal information
- Born: 18 September 1912; Napier, New Zealand
- Died: 1 July 1990 (aged 77); Hastings, New Zealand
- Source: Cricinfo, 27 October 2020

Henry Reaney (18 September 1912 – 1 July 1990) was a New Zealand cricketer. He played in two first-class matches for Wellington from 1931 to 1933.

== See also ==
- List of Wellington representative cricketers
