= Nicholas Meadows =

New Zealand cricketer (born 1962)

Personal information
- Born: 1 January 1962 (age 64); Morecambe, England
- Source: Cricinfo, 24 October 2020

Nicholas Meadows (born 1 January 1962) is a New Zealand cricketer. He played in one List A and two first-class matches for Wellington in 1980/81.

== See also ==
- List of Wellington representative cricketers
