= John Chapman (New Zealand cricketer) =

New Zealand cricketer

Personal information
- Born: 18 January 1865; Lower Hutt, New Zealand
- Died: 16 February 1949 (aged 84); Wellington, New Zealand
- Source: Cricinfo, 24 October 2020

John Chapman (18 January 1865 – 16 February 1949) was a New Zealand cricketer. He played in three first-class matches for Wellington from 1885 to 1887.

== See also ==
- List of Wellington representative cricketers
