= Douglas Binnie =

New Zealand cricketer

Personal information
- Born: 26 December 1890; Dunedin, New Zealand
- Died: 20 April 1969 (aged 78); Wellington, New Zealand
- Source: Cricinfo, 23 October 2020

Douglas Binnie (26 December 1890 – 20 April 1969) was a New Zealand cricketer. He played in one first-class match for Wellington in 1921/22.

== See also ==
- List of Wellington representative cricketers
