= John Bray (cricketer) =

New Zealand cricketer (1938–2025)

Personal information
- Full name: John Harrison Bray
- Born: 18 January 1938; Wellington, New Zealand
- Died: 11 February 2025 (aged 87); Waikanae, Kapiti Coast, New Zealand
- Batting: Right-handed
- Bowling: Right-arm medium

Domestic team information
- Years: Team
- 1958/59–1966/67: Wellington
- Source: Cricinfo, 23 October 2020

John Harrison Bray (18 January 1938 – 11 February 2025) was a New Zealand cricketer. He played in five first-class matches for Wellington from 1958 to 1967. Bray died on 11 February 2025, at the age of 87.

== See also ==
- List of Wellington representative cricketers
