= Ian Ormiston =

New Zealand cricketer (born 1963)

Personal information
- Born: 15 June 1963 (age 63); New Plymouth, New Zealand
- Source: Cricinfo, 27 October 2020

Ian Ormiston (born 15 June 1963) is a New Zealand cricketer. He played in seven first-class and two List A matches for Wellington in 1987/88.

== See also ==
- List of Wellington representative cricketers
