= Russell Kean =

New Zealand cricketer (born 1951)

Personal information
- Born: 25 March 1951 (age 75); Wellington, New Zealand
- Source: Cricinfo, 24 October 2020

Russell Kean (born 25 March 1951) is a New Zealand cricketer. He played in seven first-class matches for Wellington from 1976 to 1978.

== See also ==
- List of Wellington representative cricketers
