= Ernest Izard =

New Zealand cricketer

Personal information
- Born: 18 February 1868; Wellington, New Zealand
- Died: 23 March 1948 (aged 80); Nelson, New Zealand
- Source: Cricinfo, 24 October 2020

Ernest Izard (18 February 1868 – 23 March 1948) was a New Zealand cricketer. He played in seven first-class matches for Wellington and Taranaki from 1890 to 1898.

== See also ==
- List of Wellington representative cricketers
