= Leonard Beard =

New Zealand cricketer

Personal information
- Born: 27 April 1895; Carterton, New Zealand
- Died: 21 March 1978 (aged 82); Palmerston North, New Zealand
- Source: Cricinfo, 23 October 2020

Leonard Beard (27 April 1895 – 21 March 1978) was a New Zealand cricketer. He played in one first-class match for Wellington in 1927/28.

== See also ==
- List of Wellington representative cricketers
