= Scott Rasmussen (cricketer) =

New Zealand cricketer (born 1978)

Personal information
- Born: 18 November 1978 (age 47); Wellington, New Zealand
- Source: Cricinfo, 27 October 2020

Scott Rasmussen (born 18 November 1978) is a New Zealand cricketer. He played in six first-class and twelve List A matches for Wellington from 2005 to 2007.

== See also ==
- List of Wellington representative cricketers
