= Allan Cook (cricketer) =

New Zealand cricketer

Personal information
- Born: 30 October 1924; Lower Hutt, New Zealand
- Died: 20 March 1989 (aged 64); Lower Hutt, New Zealand
- Source: Cricinfo, 24 October 2020

Allan Cook (30 October 1924 – 20 March 1989) was a New Zealand cricketer. He played in two first-class matches for Wellington from 1955 to 1957.

== See also ==
- List of Wellington representative cricketers
