= Ronald Crook =

New Zealand cricketer

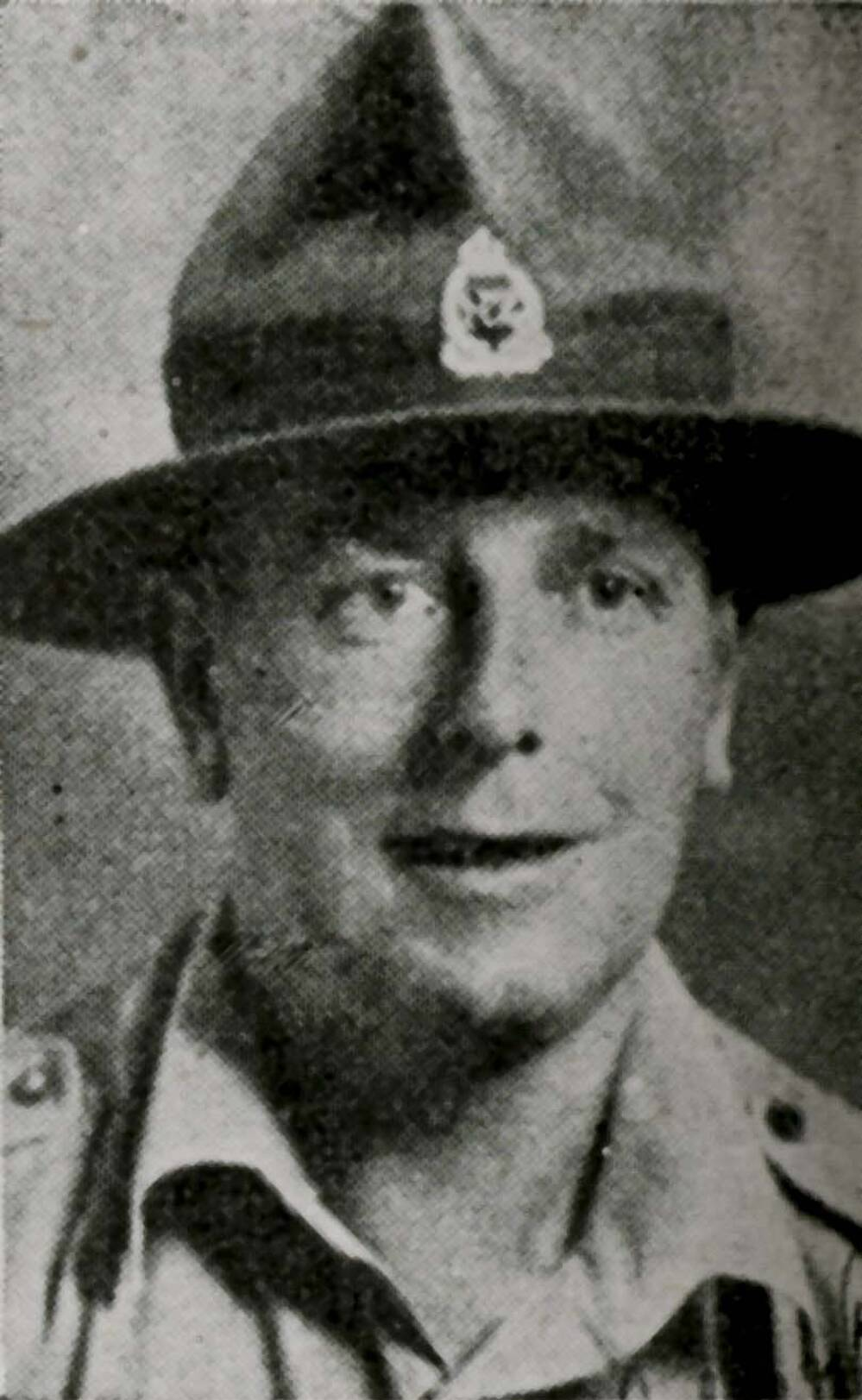

Personal information
- Born: 28 January 1907; Wellington, New Zealand
- Died: 17 January 1943 (aged 35); Western Desert, Libya
- Source: Cricinfo, 24 October 2020

Ronald Crook (28 January 1907 – 17 January 1943) was a New Zealand cricketer. He played in nine first-class matches for Wellington from 1930 to 1934.

== See also ==
- List of Wellington representative cricketers
