= Chris Pickett (New Zealand cricketer) =

New Zealand cricketer (born 1955)

Personal information
- Born: 15 September 1955 (age 71); Christchurch, New Zealand
- Source: Cricinfo, 27 October 2020

Chris Pickett (born 15 September 1955) is a New Zealand cricketer. He played in one first-class and one List A match for Wellington in 1983/84.

== See also ==
- List of Wellington representative cricketers
