= Ming Nightingale =

New Zealand cricketer

Personal information
- Full name: Alan Francis Nightingale
- Born: 1 November 1928; Greymouth, New Zealand
- Died: 16 June 2011 (aged 82); Wellington, New Zealand
- Source: Cricinfo, 27 October 2020

Ming Nightingale (1 November 1928 – 16 June 2011) was a New Zealand cricketer. He played in twelve first-class matches for Wellington from 1950 to 1959.

== See also ==
- List of Wellington representative cricketers
