= Eric Schrader =

New Zealand cricketer

Personal information
- Born: 12 April 1898; Wellington, New Zealand
- Died: 1976 (aged 77–78); Pukekohe, New Zealand
- Source: Cricket Archive, 27 October 2020

Eric Schrader (12 April 1898 – 1976) was a New Zealand cricketer. He played in three first-class matches for Wellington in 1919/20.

== See also ==
- List of Wellington representative cricketers
