= John Topp =

New Zealand cricketer (born 1952)

Personal information
- Born: 7 March 1952 (age 74); Lower Hutt, New Zealand
- Source: Cricinfo, 27 October 2020

John Topp (born 7 March 1952) is a New Zealand cricketer. He played in one first-class match for Wellington in 1978/79.

== See also ==
- List of Wellington representative cricketers
