= Pat Malcon =

New Zealand cricketer (born 1947)

Personal information
- Full name: Patrick John Malcon
- Born: 2 April 1947 (age 79)
- Source: Cricinfo, 4 April 2018

Pat Malcon (born 2 April 1947) is a New Zealand cricketer. He played in two first-class matches for Wellington in 1972/73. In April 2018, he won the Bert Sutcliffe Medal for Outstanding Services to Cricket at the New Zealand Cricket Awards.

== See also ==
- List of Wellington representative cricketers
