= Tim Ritchie (cricketer) =

New Zealand cricketer (born 1964)

Personal information
- Born: 10 January 1964 (age 62); Christchurch, New Zealand
- Source: Cricinfo, 27 October 2020

Tim Ritchie (born 10 January 1964) is a New Zealand cricketer. He played in 59 first-class and 31 List A matches for Wellington from 1982 to 1991.

== See also ==
- List of Wellington representative cricketers
