= Glenn Wilkinson =

New Zealand cricketer (born 1970)

Personal information
- Born: 23 April 1970 (age 56); Wellington, New Zealand
- Source: Cricinfo, 27 October 2020

Glenn Wilkinson (born 23 April 1970) is a New Zealand cricketer. He played in one first-class match for Wellington in 1996/97.

== See also ==
- List of Wellington representative cricketers
