= Frederick Bowles =

New Zealand cricketer

Personal information
- Born: 1875; Maidstone, England
- Died: 20 March 1956 (aged 80–81); Christchurch, New Zealand
- Source: Cricinfo, 23 October 2020

Frederick Bowles (1875 – 20 March 1956) was a New Zealand cricketer. He played in one first-class matches for Wellington in 1911/12.

== See also ==
- List of Wellington representative cricketers
