= Victor Waters =

New Zealand cricketer

Personal information
- Born: 31 May 1876; Wellington, New Zealand
- Died: 17 November 1951 (aged 75); Wellington, New Zealand
- Source: Cricinfo, 27 October 2020

Victor Waters (31 May 1876 – 17 November 1951) was a New Zealand cricketer. He played in twelve first-class matches for Wellington from 1895 to 1906.

== See also ==
- List of Wellington representative cricketers
