= Philip Connelly =

New Zealand cricketer

Personal information
- Born: 1881; Grafton, New South Wales, Australia
- Died: 1960 (aged 78–79); Sydney, Australia
- Source: Cricket Archive, 24 October 2020

Philip Connelly (1881 – 1960) was a New Zealand cricketer. He played in two first-class matches for Wellington in 1908/09.

== See also ==
- List of Wellington representative cricketers
