= Colin McIntosh (cricketer) =

New Zealand cricketer

Personal information
- Born: 17 May 1892; Queensland, Australia
- Died: 23 March 1977 (aged 84); Wellington, New Zealand
- Source: Cricinfo, 24 October 2020

Colin McIntosh (17 May 1892 – 23 March 1977) was a New Zealand cricketer. He played in one first-class match for Wellington in 1914/15.

== See also ==
- List of Wellington representative cricketers
