= William Holmes (New Zealand cricketer) =

New Zealand cricketer

Personal information
- Born: c. 1849
- Died: 26 November 1885 (aged 35–36); Wellington, New Zealand
- Source: Cricinfo, 24 October 2020

William Holmes (c. 1849 – 26 November 1885) was a New Zealand cricketer. He played in three first-class matches for Wellington from 1880 to 1884.

== See also ==
- List of Wellington representative cricketers
