= Bruce Smith (cricketer) =

New Zealand cricketer (born 1946)

Personal information
- Born: 8 October 1946 (age 80); Wellington, New Zealand
- Source: Cricinfo, 27 October 2020

Bruce Smith (born 8 October 1946) is a New Zealand cricketer. He played in 42 first-class and 13 List A matches for Wellington from 1965 to 1977.

== See also ==
- List of Wellington representative cricketers
