= William Ogier =

New Zealand cricketer

Personal information
- Born: 30 September 1863; Christchurch, New Zealand
- Died: 27 November 1941 (aged 78); Wellington, New Zealand
- Source: Cricinfo, 27 October 2020

William Ogier (30 September 1863 – 27 November 1941) was a New Zealand cricketer. He played in three first-class matches for Wellington from 1889 to 1892.

== See also ==
- List of Wellington representative cricketers
