= Lindsay Williams (cricketer) =

New Zealand cricketer

Personal information
- Born: 12 July 1933; Auckland, New Zealand
- Died: 18 April 2008 (aged 74); Christchurch, New Zealand
- Source: Cricinfo, 27 October 2020

Lindsay Williams (12 July 1933 – 18 April 2008) was a New Zealand cricketer. He played in six first-class matches for Wellington from 1951 to 1954.

== See also ==
- List of Wellington representative cricketers
