= Michael Burns (New Zealand cricketer) =

New Zealand cricketer (born 1979)

Personal information
- Born: 6 July 1979 (age 47); Balclutha, New Zealand
- Source: Cricinfo, 23 October 2020

Michael Burns (born 6 July 1979) is a New Zealand cricketer. He played in thirteen first-class and nine List A matches for Wellington from 2006 to 2010.

== See also ==
- List of Wellington representative cricketers
