= Matthew Goodson (cricketer, born 1970) =

New Zealand cricketer (born 1970)

Personal information
- Born: 3 March 1970 (age 56); Palmerston North, New Zealand
- Source: Cricinfo, 7 March 2017

Matthew Goodson (born 3 March 1970) is a New Zealand cricketer. He played seventeen first-class matches for Central Districts and Wellington between 1989 and 1995.

== See also ==
- List of Wellington representative cricketers
