= Edgar Brooke =

New Zealand cricketer

Personal information
- Born: 19 December 1862; England
- Died: 3 May 1938 (aged 75); Auckland, New Zealand
- Source: Cricinfo, 23 October 2020

Edgar Brooke (19 December 1862 – 3 May 1938) was a New Zealand cricketer. He played in two first-class matches for Wellington in 1889/90.

== See also ==
- List of Wellington representative cricketers
