= John Crowther (cricketer) =

New Zealand cricketer

Personal information
- Born: 26 August 1850; Wellington, New Zealand
- Died: 17 October 1894 (aged 44); Wellington, New Zealand
- Source: Cricinfo, 24 October 2020

John Crowther (26 August 1850 – 17 October 1894) was a New Zealand cricketer. He played in two first-class matches for Wellington from 1873 to 1882. In 1894, Crowther died of Bright's disease, now called nephritis.

== See also ==
- List of Wellington representative cricketers
