= Alfred Barton (cricketer) =

New Zealand cricketer

Personal information
- Born: 22 May 1874; Blenheim, New Zealand
- Died: 2 April 1960 (aged 85); Nelson, New Zealand
- Source: Cricinfo, 23 October 2020

Alfred Barton (22 May 1874 – 2 April 1960) was a New Zealand cricketer. He played in one first-class match for Wellington in 1904/05.

== See also ==
- List of Wellington representative cricketers
