= Maurice Browne (cricketer) =

New Zealand cricketer

Personal information
- Full name: Maurice Gerald Browne
- Born: 28 September 1913; Pretoria, South Africa
- Died: 21 December 1980 (aged 67); Wellington, New Zealand
- Source: Cricinfo, 23 October 2020

Maurice Gerald Browne (28 September 1913 – 21 December 1980) was a New Zealand cricketer. He played in nine first-class matches for Wellington from 1937 to 1952.

== See also ==
- List of Wellington representative cricketers
