= Ash Turner =

New Zealand cricketer (born 1975)

Personal information
- Born: 13 June 1975 (age 51); Lower Hutt, New Zealand
- Source: Cricinfo, 27 October 2020

Ash Turner (born 13 June 1975) is a New Zealand cricketer. He played in 8 first-class and 27 List A matches for Wellington from 2001 to 2005.

== See also ==
- List of Wellington representative cricketers
