= William Ingle (cricketer) =

New Zealand cricketer

Personal information
- Born: 1856; Pontefract, England
- Died: 14 April 1899 (aged 42–43); Whanganui, New Zealand
- Source: Cricinfo, 24 October 2020

William Ingle (1856 – 14 April 1899) was a New Zealand cricketer. He played in two first-class matches for Wellington in 1879/80.

== See also ==
- List of Wellington representative cricketers
