= Edgar Bold =

New Zealand cricketer

Personal information
- Born: 7 October 1899; Wellington, New Zealand
- Died: 9 July 1965 (aged 65); Auckland, New Zealand
- Source: Cricinfo, 23 October 2020

Edgar Bold (7 October 1899 – 9 July 1965) was a New Zealand cricketer. He played in one first-class match for Wellington in 1919/20.

== See also ==
- List of Wellington representative cricketers
