= Thomas Harpur (New Zealand cricketer) =

New Zealand cricketer

Personal information
- Born: 5 December 1915; Hunterville, New Zealand
- Died: 26 August 1986 (aged 70); Rotorua, New Zealand
- Source: Cricinfo, 24 October 2020

Thomas Harpur (5 December 1915 – 26 August 1986) was a New Zealand cricketer. He played in two first-class matches for Wellington in 1938/39.

== See also ==
- List of Wellington representative cricketers
