= William Norris (Wellington cricketer) =

New Zealand cricketer

Personal information
- Full name: William Edward Norris
- Born: 7 April 1908; Palmerston North, New Zealand
- Died: 17 October 1988 (aged 80); Palmerston North, New Zealand
- Nickname: Red
- Batting: Left-handed
- Role: Wicketkeeper-batsman
- Source: Cricinfo, 27 October 2020

William Edward "Red" Norris (7 April 1908 – 17 October 1988) was a New Zealand cricketer. He played in five first-class matches for Wellington from 1940 to 1943.

Norris played Hawke Cup cricket for Manawatu from 1926 to 1947, scoring 1242 runs at an average of 22.58 in 42 challenge matches. He captained Manawatu when they won the title from Taranaki in December 1934. He held the run-scoring record for his club, Palmerston, until 2020, with 7,018 runs.

== See also ==
- List of Wellington representative cricketers
