= Noel Burnette =

New Zealand cricketer

Personal information
- Born: 13 June 1914; Wellington, New Zealand
- Died: 29 April 1991 (aged 76); Wellington, New Zealand
- Source: Cricinfo, 23 October 2020

Noel Burnette (13 June 1914 – 29 April 1991) was a New Zealand cricketer. He played in five first-class matches for Wellington from 1940 to 1946.

== See also ==
- List of Wellington representative cricketers
