= Carne Blacklock =

New Zealand cricketer

Personal information
- Born: 30 January 1884; Wellington, New Zealand
- Died: 30 January 1924 (aged 40); Wellington, New Zealand
- Source: Cricinfo, 23 October 2020

Carne Blacklock (30 January 1884 – 30 January 1924) was a New Zealand cricketer. He played in two first-class matches for Wellington in 1905/06.

== See also ==
- List of Wellington representative cricketers
