= William McDermid =

New Zealand cricketer

Personal information
- Born: 1881; Melbourne, Australia
- Died: 1958 (aged 76–77); New South Wales, Australia
- Source: Cricinfo, 24 October 2020

William McDermid (1881–1958) was a New Zealand cricketer. He played in two first-class matches for Wellington in 1906/07.

== See also ==
- List of Wellington representative cricketers
