= Wilfrid Airey =

New Zealand cricketer

Personal information
- Full name: Wilfrid Farrant Airey
- Born: 27 September 1907; Nelson, New Zealand
- Died: 19 July 1980 (aged 72); Lower Hutt, New Zealand
- Source: Cricinfo, 23 October 2020

Wilfrid Farrant Airey (27 September 1907 – 19 July 1980) was a New Zealand cricketer. Airey was a left-handed batsman. He played in seven first-class matches for Wellington from 1927 to 1940.

== See also ==
- List of Wellington representative cricketers
