= William Kennedy (cricketer) =

New Zealand cricketer

Personal information
- Born: 1853
- Died: 24 August 1889 (aged 35–36); Sydney, Australia
- Source: Cricinfo, 24 October 2020

William Kennedy (1853 – 24 August 1889) was a New Zealand cricketer. He played in five first-class matches for Wellington from 1877 to 1884.

== See also ==
- List of Wellington representative cricketers
