= John Quinn (Wellington cricketer) =

New Zealand cricketer

Personal information
- Born: 1889; Ireland
- Died: 3 December 1967 (aged 77–78); Wellington, New Zealand
- Source: Cricinfo, 27 October 2020

John Quinn (1889 – 3 December 1967) was a New Zealand cricketer. He played in two first-class matches for Wellington in 1913/14.

== See also ==
- List of Wellington representative cricketers
