= Barry Rhodes =

New Zealand cricketer (born 1987)

Personal information
- Born: 12 February 1987 (age 39); Port Elizabeth, South Africa
- Source: Cricinfo, 27 October 2020

Barry Rhodes (born 12 February 1987) is a New Zealand cricketer. He played in four List A matches for Wellington in 2011.

== See also ==
- List of Wellington representative cricketers
