= William Perkins (New Zealand cricketer) =

New Zealand cricketer

Personal information
- Born: 23 March 1934 (age 92); Wellington, New Zealand
- Source: Cricinfo, 27 October 2020

William Perkins (born 23 March 1934) is a New Zealand cricketer. He played in six first-class matches for Wellington from 1952 to 1954.

== See also ==
- List of Wellington representative cricketers
