= James Salmon =

James Salmon may refer to:

- James Salmon (architect, born 1805) (1805–1888), Scottish architect
- James Salmon (architect, born 1873) (1873–1924), his grandson, also a Scottish architect
- James Salmon (cricketer) (1849–1903), New Zealand cricketer
