= Gustave Kuchen =

New Zealand cricketer

Personal information
- Born: 1856; Sweden
- Died: 3 September 1897 (aged 40–41); Wellington, New Zealand
- Source: Cricinfo, 24 October 2020

Gustave Kuchen (1856 – 3 September 1897) was a New Zealand cricketer. He played in one first-class match for Wellington in 1880/81. He died of tuberculosis in 1897.

== See also ==
- List of Wellington representative cricketers
