= Harold White (New Zealand cricketer) =

New Zealand cricketer

Personal information
- Born: 1 September 1896; East Brunswick, Victoria, Australia
- Died: 12 September 1977 (aged 81); Wellington, New Zealand
- Source: Cricinfo, 27 October 2020

Harold White (1 September 1896 – 12 September 1977) was a New Zealand cricketer. He played in one first-class match for Wellington in 1923/24.

== See also ==
- List of Wellington representative cricketers
