= Harold Osborn (cricketer) =

New Zealand cricketer

Personal information
- Born: 14 June 1909; Wellington, New Zealand
- Died: 11 December 1986 (aged 77); Wellington, New Zealand
- Source: Cricinfo, 27 October 2020

Harold Osborn (14 June 1909 – 11 December 1986) was a New Zealand cricketer. He played in four first-class matches for Wellington from 1940 to 1942.

== See also ==
- List of Wellington representative cricketers
