= Edgar Phillips (cricketer) =

New Zealand cricketer

Personal information
- Born: 28 July 1891; Wellington, New Zealand
- Died: 13 August 1956 (aged 65); Gisborne, New Zealand
- Source: Cricinfo, 27 October 2020

Edgar Phillips (28 July 1891 – 13 August 1956) was a New Zealand cricketer. He played in eight first-class matches for Wellington from 1911 to 1921.

== See also ==
- List of Wellington representative cricketers
