= David Paetz =

New Zealand cricketer (1940–2025)

Personal information
- Full name: David Laurence Paetz
- Born: 1 May 1940; Wellington, New Zealand
- Died: 30 January 2025 (aged 84); Petone, Lower Hutt, Wellington, New Zealand
- Batting: Right-handed
- Bowling: Right-arm off-break

Domestic team information
- Years: Team
- 1966/67: Wellington
- Source: Cricinfo, 27 October 2020

David Laurence Paetz (1 May 1940 – 30 January 2025) was a New Zealand cricketer. He played in one first-class match for Wellington in 1966/67. He died on 30 January 2025, at the age of 84.

== See also ==
- List of Wellington representative cricketers
