= Arthur Doneghue =

New Zealand cricketer

Personal information
- Born: 31 May 1897; Sydney, Australia
- Died: 8 December 1960 (aged 63); Wellington, New Zealand
- Source: Cricinfo, 24 October 2020

Arthur Doneghue (31 May 1897 – 8 December 1960) was a New Zealand cricketer. He played in six first-class matches for Wellington from 1919 to 1928.

== See also ==
- List of Wellington representative cricketers
