= Thomas Downes =

New Zealand cricketer

Personal information
- Born: 12 January 1921; Palmerston North, New Zealand
- Died: 24 June 1960 (aged 39); Wellington, New Zealand
- Source: Cricinfo, 24 October 2020

Thomas Downes (12 January 1921 – 24 June 1960) was a New Zealand cricketer. He played in five first-class matches for Wellington from 1940 to 1947.

== See also ==
- List of Wellington representative cricketers
