= Bernard Weyburne =

New Zealand cricketer

Personal information
- Born: 15 October 1877; Christchurch, New Zealand
- Died: 18 December 1970 (aged 93); Wellington, New Zealand
- Source: Cricinfo, 27 October 2020

Bernard Weyburne (15 October 1877 – 18 December 1970) was a New Zealand cricketer. He played in seven first-class matches for Wellington from 1896 to 1906.

== See also ==
- List of Wellington representative cricketers
