= Bernie Rule =

New Zealand cricketer (born 1957)

Personal information
- Born: 29 June 1957 (age 69); Christchurch, New Zealand
- Source: Cricinfo, 27 October 2020

Bernie Rule (born 29 June 1957) is a New Zealand cricketer. He played in one List A and three first-class matches for Wellington in 1982/83.

== See also ==
- List of Wellington representative cricketers
