= William Kirker =

New Zealand cricketer

Personal information
- Born: 30 January 1866; Christchurch, New Zealand
- Died: 27 February 1942 (aged 76); Wellington, New Zealand
- Source: Cricinfo, 24 October 2020

William Kirker (30 January 1866 – 27 February 1942) was a New Zealand cricketer. He played in three first-class matches for Wellington from 1887 to 1894.

== See also ==
- List of Wellington representative cricketers
