= William Judd (New Zealand cricketer) =

New Zealand cricketer

Personal information
- Born: 1 May 1864; Greytown, New Zealand
- Died: 25 December 1906 (aged 42); Masterton, New Zealand
- Source: Cricinfo, 24 October 2020

William Judd (1 May 1864 – 25 December 1906) was a New Zealand cricketer. He played in two first-class matches for Wellington in 1886/87.

== See also ==
- List of Wellington representative cricketers
