= David Burt (cricketer) =

New Zealand cricketer

Personal information
- Born: 28 November 1901; Auckland, New Zealand
- Source: Cricinfo, 23 October 2020

David Burt (born 28 November 1901, date of death unknown) was a New Zealand cricketer. He played in one first-class match for Wellington in 1924/25.

== See also ==
- List of Wellington representative cricketers
