= Phil Chandler =

New Zealand cricketer (born 1972)

Personal information
- Born: 6 July 1972 (age 54); Wellington, New Zealand
- Source: Cricinfo, 24 October 2020

Phil Chandler (born 6 July 1972) is a New Zealand cricketer. He played in 31 first-class and 47 List A matches for Wellington from 1994 to 2002.

== See also ==
- List of Wellington representative cricketers
