= Edwin Jacobs =

New Zealand cricketer

Personal information
- Born: 14 March 1853; Croydon, England
- Died: 26 April 1901 (aged 48); Palmerston North, New Zealand
- Source: Cricinfo, 24 October 2020

Edwin Jacobs (14 March 1853 – 26 April 1901) was a New Zealand cricketer. He played in one first-class match for Wellington in 1873/74.

== See also ==
- List of Wellington representative cricketers
