= George McLellan =

New Zealand cricketer (born 1940)

Personal information
- Born: 6 September 1940 (age 86); Wellington, New Zealand
- Source: Cricinfo, 24 October 2020

George McLellan (born 6 September 1940) is a New Zealand cricketer. He played in two first-class matches for Wellington from 1965 to 1968.

== See also ==
- List of Wellington representative cricketers
