= Alan Ronaldson =

New Zealand cricketer (1896–1965)

Personal information
- Born: 12 September 1896; Wellington, New Zealand
- Died: 9 January 1965 (aged 68); Dunedin, New Zealand
- Source: Cricinfo, 27 October 2020

Alan Ronaldson (12 September 1896 – 9 January 1965) was a New Zealand cricketer. He played in one first-class match for Wellington in 1922/23.

== See also ==
- List of Wellington representative cricketers
