= Lionel Browne =

New Zealand cricketer

Personal information
- Born: 14 December 1909; Wellington, New Zealand
- Died: 22 December 1997 (aged 88); Auckland, New Zealand
- Source: Cricinfo, 23 October 2020

Lionel Browne (14 December 1909 – 22 December 1997) was a New Zealand cricketer. He played in two first-class matches for Wellington from 1928 to 1931.

== See also ==
- List of Wellington representative cricketers
