= Edward Prideaux =

New Zealand cricketer

Personal information
- Born: 23 March 1864; Wellington, New Zealand
- Died: 3 April 1948 (aged 84); Sydney, Australia
- Source: Cricinfo, 27 October 2020

Edward Prideaux (23 March 1864 – 3 April 1948) was a New Zealand cricketer. He played in one first-class match for Wellington in 1885/86.

== See also ==
- List of Wellington representative cricketers
