= Arthur Bennett (New Zealand cricketer) =

New Zealand cricketer

Personal information
- Born: 1 December 1884; Wellington, New Zealand
- Died: 9 November 1918 (aged 33); Wellington, New Zealand
- Source: Cricinfo, 23 October 2020

Arthur Bennett (1 December 1884 – 9 November 1918) was a New Zealand cricketer. He played in three first-class matches for Wellington from 1913 and 1918.

== See also ==
- List of Wellington representative cricketers
