= Jack Capstick =

New Zealand cricketer

Personal information
- Born: 1 January 1919; Dunedin, New Zealand
- Died: 24 December 1993 (aged 74); Wellington, New Zealand
- Source: Cricinfo, 24 October 2020

Jack Capstick (1 January 1919 – 24 December 1993) was a New Zealand cricketer. He played in three first-class matches for Wellington in 1946/47.

== See also ==
- List of Wellington representative cricketers
