= Edmund Knapp =

New Zealand cricketer

Personal information
- Born: 24 April 1917; Greymouth, New Zealand
- Died: 19 February 1989 (aged 71); Whanganui, New Zealand
- Source: Cricinfo, 24 October 2020

Edmund Knapp (24 April 1917 – 19 February 1989) was a New Zealand cricketer. He played in four first-class matches for Wellington from 1943 to 1945.

== See also ==
- List of Wellington representative cricketers
