= James Milne (cricketer) =

New Zealand cricketer (born 1961)

Personal information
- Born: 2 December 1961 (age 64); Wellington, New Zealand
- Source: Cricinfo, 27 October 2020

James Milne (born 2 December 1961) is a New Zealand cricketer. He played in eight first-class matches for Wellington from 1985 to 1988.

== See also ==
- List of Wellington representative cricketers
