= Peter Wilson (cricketer, born 1907) =

New Zealand cricketer

Personal information
- Born: 10 March 1907; Wellington, New Zealand
- Died: 2 June 1986 (aged 79); Wellington, New Zealand
- Source: Cricinfo, 27 October 2020

Peter Wilson (10 March 1907 – 2 June 1986) was a New Zealand cricketer. He played in three first-class matches for Wellington in 1940/41.

== See also ==
- List of Wellington representative cricketers
