= Sydney Nicholls (cricketer) =

New Zealand cricketer

Personal information
- Born: March 1864; London, England
- Died: 29 April 1929 (aged 65); Wellington, New Zealand
- Source: Cricinfo, 27 October 2020

Sydney Nicholls (March 1864 – 29 April 1929) was a New Zealand cricketer. He played in fifteen first-class matches for Wellington from 1882 to 1894.

== See also ==
- List of Wellington representative cricketers
