= Rurie Morgan =

New Zealand cricketer

Personal information
- Born: 30 July 1912; Wellington, New Zealand
- Died: 4 January 1980 (aged 67); Wellington, New Zealand
- Source: Cricinfo, 27 October 2020

Rurie Morgan (30 July 1912 – 4 January 1980) was a New Zealand cricketer. He played in eleven first-class matches for Wellington from 1932 to 1931.

== See also ==
- List of Wellington representative cricketers
