= Francis Betts =

New Zealand cricketer

Personal information
- Born: 11 January 1844; Riverstone, Colony of New South Wales
- Died: 15 September 1893 (aged 49); North Waimakariri, New Zealand
- Source: Cricinfo, 23 October 2020

Francis Betts (11 January 1844 – 15 September 1893) was a New Zealand cricketer. He played in one first-class match for Wellington in 1873/74.

== See also ==
- List of Wellington representative cricketers
