= Frank Taylor (Wellington cricketer) =

New Zealand cricketer

Personal information
- Full name: Frank James Taylor
- Born: 1859; Hull, Yorkshire, England
- Died: 2 May 1937 (aged 77–78); Lower Hutt, New Zealand
- Source: ESPNcricinfo, 25 June 2016

Frank Taylor (1859 – 2 May 1937) was a New Zealand cricketer. He played two first-class matches for Wellington between 1888 and 1891.

== See also ==
- List of Wellington representative cricketers
