= Jim Thomson (cricketer) =

New Zealand cricketer

Personal information
- Full name: James Cecil Alexander Thomson
- Born: 17 April 1933; Napier, New Zealand
- Died: 10 August 2022 (aged 89); Nelson, New Zealand
- Batting: Right-handed
- Bowling: Slow left-arm orthodox

Domestic team information
- Years: Team
- 1953/54: Wellington

Career statistics
Competition	First-class
Matches	5
Runs scored	73
Batting average	7.30
100s/50s	0/0
Top score	22
Balls bowled	886
Wickets	8
Bowling average	51.50
5 wickets in innings	0
10 wickets in match	0
Best bowling	4/93
Catches/stumpings	2/–
- Source: Cricinfo, 8 January 2023

James Cecil Alexander Thomson (17 April 1933 – 10 August 2022) was a New Zealand cricketer. He played in five first-class matches for Wellington in 1953/54. He played for the New Zealand Universities cricket team from 1953/54 to 1958/59, including on their tour to Australia in early 1959, and played Hawke Cup cricket for Manawatu from 1959/60 to 1965/66.

Thomson graduated from Victoria University College with a Bachelor of Laws degree in 1958, and became a solicitor based in Feilding. In 1998, he was appointed a master of the High Court for a three-year term. Thomson died in Nelson on 10 August 2022.

== See also ==
- List of Wellington representative cricketers
