= Jim Kelly (New Zealand cricketer) =

New Zealand cricketer

Personal information
- Born: 9 December 1928; Stillwater, New Zealand
- Died: 9 January 1995 (aged 66); Auckland, New Zealand
- Source: Cricinfo, 24 October 2020

Jim Kelly (9 December 1928 – 9 January 1995) was a New Zealand cricketer. He played in one first-class match for Wellington in 1950/51.

== See also ==
- List of Wellington representative cricketers
