= Frank Alpe =

New Zealand cricketer

Personal information
- Full name: Frank Gordon Alpe
- Born: 26 March 1884; Wellington, New Zealand
- Died: 10 March 1958 (aged 73); Waikanae, New Zealand
- Source: Cricinfo, 23 October 2020

Frank Alpe (26 March 1884 – 10 March 1958) was a New Zealand cricketer. He played in one first-class match for Wellington in 1908/09.

== See also ==
- List of Wellington representative cricketers
