= Kevin Forde =

New Zealand cricketer (born 1985)

Personal information
- Born: 22 November 1985 (age 40); Invercargill, New Zealand
- Source: Cricinfo, 24 October 2020

Kevin Forde (born 22 November 1985) is a New Zealand cricketer. He played in one List A and two Twenty20 matches for Wellington in 2006 and 2007.

== See also ==
- List of Wellington representative cricketers
