= Patrick McIntyre =

New Zealand cricketer

Personal information
- Born: c. 1844
- Died: 23 November 1898 (aged 53–54); Wellington, New Zealand
- Source: Cricinfo, 24 October 2020

Patrick McIntyre (c. 1844 – 23 November 1898) was a New Zealand cricketer. He played in one first-class match for Wellington in 1887/88.

== See also ==
- List of Wellington representative cricketers
