= Brent Middleton =

New Zealand cricketer (born 1954)

Personal information
- Born: 18 February 1954 (age 72); Lower Hutt, New Zealand
- Source: Cricinfo, 27 October 2020

Brent Middleton (born 18 February 1954) is a New Zealand cricketer. He played in three first-class and two List A matches for Wellington from 1972 to 1974.

== See also ==
- List of Wellington representative cricketers
