= Melville Crombie =

New Zealand cricketer

Personal information
- Born: 28 May 1876; Wellington, New Zealand
- Died: 23 April 1932 (aged 55); Wellington, New Zealand
- Source: Cricinfo, 24 October 2020

Melville Crombie (28 May 1876 – 23 April 1932) was a New Zealand cricketer. He played in three first-class matches for Wellington from 1900 to 1912.

== See also ==
- List of Wellington representative cricketers
