= John Ogilvie (Wellington cricketer) =

New Zealand cricketer (1931–2021)

Personal information
- Full name: John Edward Ogilvie
- Born: 12 September 1931; Petone, New Zealand
- Died: 17 April 2021 (aged 89); Lower Hutt, New Zealand
- Batting: Right-handed

Domestic team information
- Years: Team
- 1953/54–1963/64: Wellington
- First-class debut: 7 January 1954 Wellington v Otago
- Last First-class: 31 January 1964 Wellington v Auckland

Career statistics
Competition	First-class
Matches	5
Runs scored	244
Batting average	24.40
100s/50s	0/2
Top score	54
Catches/stumpings	3/0
- Source: Cricinfo, 25 May 2021

John Edward Ogilvie (12 September 1931 – 17 April 2021) was a New Zealand cricketer. He played in five first-class matches for Wellington from 1954 to 1964.

Ogilvie died in Lower Hutt on 17 April 2021.

== See also ==
- List of Wellington representative cricketers
