= Bob Whyte =

New Zealand cricketer

Personal information
- Born: 10 December 1907; Wellington, New Zealand
- Died: 15 January 1983 (aged 75); Porirua, New Zealand
- Source: Cricinfo, 27 October 2020

Bob Whyte (10 December 1907 – 15 January 1983) was a New Zealand cricketer. He played in two first-class matches for Wellington in 1934/35.

== See also ==
- List of Wellington representative cricketers
