= Thorn Russ =

New Zealand cricketer

Personal information
- Full name: Thornton Stirling Russ
- Born: 3 January 1922; Auckland, New Zealand
- Died: 9 February 1976 (aged 54); Wellington, New Zealand
- Source: Cricinfo, 27 October 2020

Thornton Stirling Russ (3 January 1922 – 9 February 1976) was a New Zealand cricketer. He played in three first-class matches for Wellington from 1940 to 1946.

== See also ==
- List of Wellington representative cricketers
