= Percy Smith (New Zealand cricketer) =

New Zealand cricketer

Personal information
- Born: 28 March 1883; Wellington, New Zealand
- Died: 23 June 1932 (aged 49); Wellington, New Zealand
- Source: Cricinfo, 27 October 2020

Percy Smith (28 March 1883 – 23 June 1932) was a New Zealand cricketer. He played in one first-class match for Wellington in 1909/10.

== See also ==
- List of Wellington representative cricketers
