= Jack Rodgers =

New Zealand cricketer

Personal information
- Born: 1877; Hokitika, New Zealand
- Died: 3 October 1941 (aged 63–64); Wellington, New Zealand
- Source: Cricinfo, 27 October 2020

Jack Rodgers (1877 – 3 October 1941) was a New Zealand cricketer. He played in three first-class matches for Wellington from 1908 to 1915.

== See also ==
- List of Wellington representative cricketers
