= Max Meech =

New Zealand cricketer

Personal information
- Born: 25 October 1914; Wellington, New Zealand
- Died: 27 June 1977 (aged 62); Wellington, New Zealand
- Source: Cricinfo, 27 October 2020

Max Meech (25 October 1914 – 27 June 1977) was a New Zealand cricketer. He played in two first-class matches for Wellington in 1946/47.

== See also ==
- List of Wellington representative cricketers
