= John Francis (New Zealand cricketer) =

New Zealand cricketer

Personal information
- Born: 1846; Epping, England
- Died: 6 April 1891 (aged 44–45); Auckland, New Zealand
- Source: Cricinfo, 24 October 2020

John Francis (1846 – 6 April 1891) was a New Zealand cricketer. He played in one first-class match for Wellington in 1880/81.

== See also ==
- List of Wellington representative cricketers
