= Ivo Symes =

New Zealand cricketer

Personal information
- Born: 10 December 1909; Whanganui, New Zealand
- Died: 11 June 2002 (aged 92); Wellington, New Zealand
- Source: Cricinfo, 27 October 2020

Ivo Symes (10 December 1909 – 11 June 2002) was a New Zealand cricketer. He played in three first-class matches for Wellington from 1934 to 1936.

== See also ==
- List of Wellington representative cricketers
