= Henry Hickson =

New Zealand cricketer

Personal information
- Born: 19 April 1859; Wellington, New Zealand
- Died: 29 April 1883 (aged 24); Wellington, New Zealand
- Source: Cricinfo, 24 October 2020

Henry Hickson (19 April 1859 – 29 April 1883) was a New Zealand cricketer. He played in three first-class matches for Wellington from 1879 to 1882.

== See also ==
- List of Wellington representative cricketers
