= Thomas Connell (cricketer) =

New Zealand and Australian cricketer

Personal information
- Born: 4 March 1869; Invercargill, New Zealand
- Source: ESPNcricinfo, 25 December 2016

Thomas Connell (born 4 March 1869, date of death unknown) was a New Zealand and Australian cricketer. He played one first-class match for New South Wales in 1897 and two first-class matches for Wellington in 1901.

== See also ==
- List of New South Wales representative cricketers
- List of Wellington representative cricketers
