= Jack Standidge =

New Zealand cricketer

Personal information
- Full name: Jack Allen Standidge
- Born: 6 May 1907; Wellington, New Zealand
- Died: 31 March 1958 (aged 50); Wellington, New Zealand
- Relatives: Paul Standidge (son)
- Source: Cricinfo, 27 October 2020

Jack Allen Standidge (6 May 1907 – 31 March 1958) was a New Zealand cricketer. He played in one first-class match for Wellington in 1940/41.

== See also ==
- List of Wellington representative cricketers
