= Gary Snowden =

New Zealand cricketer (born 1940)

Personal information
- Born: 29 October 1940 (age 86); Nelson, New Zealand
- Source: Cricinfo, 27 October 2020

Gary Snowden (born 29 October 1940) is a New Zealand cricketer. He played in one first-class match for Wellington in 1968/69.

== See also ==
- List of Wellington representative cricketers
