= Sydney Jacobs =

New Zealand cricketer

Personal information
- Born: 1867; Alderbury, England
- Died: 17 October 1932 (aged 64–65); Christchurch, New Zealand
- Source: Cricinfo, 24 October 2020

Sydney Jacobs (1867 – 17 October 1932) was a New Zealand cricketer. He played in one first-class match for Wellington in 1899/1900.

== See also ==
- List of Wellington representative cricketers
