= Thomas Malcolm =

New Zealand cricketer

Personal information
- Born: 1861; Ballarat, Victoria, Australia
- Died: 29 October 1897 (aged 35–36); Wellington, New Zealand
- Source: Cricinfo, 24 October 2020

Thomas Malcolm (1861 – 29 October 1897) was a New Zealand cricketer. He played in one first-class match for Wellington in 1885/86.

== See also ==
- List of Wellington representative cricketers
