= Brian Sergent (cricketer) =

New Zealand cricketer

Personal information
- Born: 27 November 1926; Wellington, New Zealand
- Died: 1 August 1998 (aged 71); Wellington, New Zealand
- Source: Cricinfo, 27 October 2020

Brian Sergent (27 November 1926 – 1 August 1998) was a New Zealand cricketer. He played in five first-class matches for Wellington from 1951 to 1953.

== See also ==
- List of Wellington representative cricketers
