= Scott Golder =

New Zealand cricketer (born 1976)

Personal information
- Born: 17 September 1976 (age 50); Lower Hutt, New Zealand
- Source: Cricinfo, 24 October 2020

Scott Golder (born 17 September 1976) is a New Zealand cricketer. He played in one first-class, four List A and two Twenty20 matches for Wellington from 1998 to 2008.

== See also ==
- List of Wellington representative cricketers
