= Joseph Renner =

New Zealand cricketer

Personal information
- Born: 9 December 1858; New Plymouth, New Zealand
- Died: 10 December 1916 (aged 58); Wellington, New Zealand
- Source: Cricinfo, 27 October 2020

Joseph Renner (9 December 1858 – 10 December 1916) was a New Zealand cricketer. He played in one first-class match for Wellington in 1882/83.

== See also ==
- List of Wellington representative cricketers
