= Charles Twist =

New Zealand cricketer

Personal information
- Full name: Charles Harry Twist
- Born: 1855; Prescot, Lancashire, England
- Died: 8 March 1935 (aged 79–80); Wellington, New Zealand
- Role: Batsman

Domestic team information
- Years: Team
- 1882 to 1884: Wellington

Career statistics
Competition	First-class
Matches	4
Runs scored	91
Batting average	15.16
100s/50s	0/0
Top score	35
Catches/stumpings	0/–
- Source: Cricinfo, 13 December 2021

Charles Harry Twist (1855 – 8 March 1935) was a New Zealand cricketer. He played in four first-class matches for Wellington from 1882 to 1884.

Twist was born in Lancashire and moved to New Zealand in 1879, settling in Wellington. Appointed by his fellow cricketers in 1882, he worked as the groundsman at the Basin Reserve for 30 years, establishing a reputation for the quality of his pitches.

Twist was a batsman. Two of his first-class matches were played on his own pitch at the Basin Reserve, but his most successful match was in Christchurch at Lancaster Park against Canterbury in April 1884: he scored 34 out of Wellington's first innings total of 71, when he "stemmed the tide of adversity and showed good defence, as well as hitting powers" and was run out after falling over, and followed with 35 in the second innings. He umpired two first-class matches at the Basin Reserve in 1885.

Twist married Elizabeth Lee in Wellington in July 1884. She died in October 1934, and he died at his home in March 1935. They were survived by a daughter and a son.

== See also ==
- List of Wellington representative cricketers
