= William Hickson =

New Zealand cricketer

Personal information
- Born: 4 May 1877; Greymouth, New Zealand
- Died: 30 November 1930 (aged 53); Wellington, New Zealand
- Source: Cricinfo, 24 October 2020

William Hickson (4 May 1877 – 30 November 1930) was a New Zealand cricketer. He played in twelve first-class matches for Wellington from 1896 to 1907.

== See also ==
- List of Wellington representative cricketers
