= Eustace Payne =

New Zealand cricketer

Personal information
- Born: 16 January 1887; Melbourne, Australia
- Died: 12 November 1954 (aged 67); Sydney, Australia
- Source: Cricinfo, 27 October 2020

Eustace Payne (16 January 1887 – 12 November 1954) was a New Zealand cricketer. He played in one first-class match for Wellington in 1908/09.

== See also ==
- List of Wellington representative cricketers
