= Steve Maguiness =

New Zealand cricketer (born 1959)

Personal information
- Born: 27 January 1959 (age 67); Palmerston North, New Zealand
- Source: Cricinfo, 24 October 2020

Steve Maguiness (born 27 January 1959) is a New Zealand cricketer. He played in 43 first-class and 40 List A matches for Wellington from 1981 to 1988.

== See also ==
- List of Wellington representative cricketers
