= Thomas Ronaldson =

New Zealand cricketer

Personal information
- Born: 1855; Cork, Ireland
- Died: 4 December 1931 (aged 75–76); Wellington, New Zealand
- Source: Cricinfo, 27 October 2020

Thomas Ronaldson (1855 – 4 December 1931) was a New Zealand cricketer. He played in two first-class matches for Wellington in 1883/84.

== See also ==
- List of Wellington representative cricketers
