= Ben Orton =

New Zealand cricketer (born 1986)

Personal information
- Born: 24 July 1986 (age 40); Hastings, New Zealand
- Source: Cricinfo, 27 October 2020

Ben Orton (born 24 July 1986) is a New Zealand cricketer. He played in three Twenty20 matches for Wellington in 2013.

== See also ==
- List of Wellington representative cricketers
