= Ian Storkey =

New Zealand cricketer (born 1950)

Personal information
- Born: 14 September 1950 (age 76); Napier, New Zealand
- Source: Cricinfo, 27 October 2020

Ian Storkey (born 14 September 1950) is a New Zealand cricketer. He played in one List A match for Wellington in 1975/76.

== See also ==
- List of Wellington representative cricketers
