= Stew Cater =

New Zealand cricketer

Personal information
- Full name: Stewart Bruce Cater
- Born: 4 February 1952; Nelson, New Zealand
- Died: 5 February 2005 (aged 53); Ohakune, New Zealand
- Source: Cricinfo, 24 October 2020

Stew Cater (4 February 1952 – 5 February 2005) was a New Zealand cricketer. He played in thirty first-class and ten List A matches for Wellington from 1974 to 1983.

== See also ==
- List of Wellington representative cricketers
