= Horace Prince =

New Zealand cricketer

Personal information
- Born: 21 October 1900; Napier, New Zealand
- Died: 5 May 1977 (aged 76); Wellington, New Zealand
- Source: Cricinfo, 27 October 2020

Horace Prince (21 October 1900 – 5 May 1977) was a New Zealand cricketer. He played in two first-class matches for Wellington from 1923 to 1925.

== See also ==
- List of Wellington representative cricketers
