= Thomas O'Neil (cricketer) =

New Zealand cricketer (1936–2018)

Personal information
- Born: 24 July 1936; Wellington, New Zealand
- Died: 29 November 2018 (aged 82); Katikati, New Zealand
- Source: Cricinfo, 27 October 2020

Thomas O'Neil (24 July 1936 – 29 November 2018) was a New Zealand cricketer. He played in one first-class match for Wellington in 1965/66.

== See also ==
- List of Wellington representative cricketers
