= Arnaud McKellar =

New Zealand cricketer

Personal information
- Born: 17 November 1891; Auckland, New Zealand
- Died: 28 April 1968 (aged 76); Nelson, New Zealand
- Source: Cricinfo, 24 October 2020

Arnaud McKellar (17 November 1891 – 28 April 1968) was a New Zealand cricketer. He played in one first-class match for Wellington in 1919/20.

== See also ==
- List of Wellington representative cricketers
