= Brett Williams (New Zealand cricketer) =

New Zealand cricketer (born 1965)

Personal information
- Born: 10 October 1965 (age 61); Wellington, New Zealand
- Source: Cricinfo, 27 October 2020

Brett Williams (born 10 October 1965) is a New Zealand cricketer. He played in 22 first-class and 43 List A matches for Wellington from 1987 to 1997.

== See also ==
- List of Wellington representative cricketers
