= Jack Duffy (cricketer) =

New Zealand cricketer

Personal information
- Full name: Richard John Duffy
- Born: 28 August 1911; Wellington, New Zealand
- Died: 21 June 1998 (aged 86); Otaki, New Zealand
- Source: Cricinfo, 24 October 2020

Jack Duffy (28 August 1911 – 21 June 1998) was a New Zealand cricketer. He played in nine first-class matches for Wellington from 1940 to 1946.

== See also ==
- List of Wellington representative cricketers
