= Robert Smith (Wellington cricketer) =

New Zealand cricketer (1946–2024)

Personal information
- Full name: Robert Wayne Smith
- Born: 14 May 1946; Wellington, New Zealand
- Died: 8 December 2024 (aged 78); Lower Hutt, Wellington, New Zealand
- Source: ESPNcricinfo, 31 December 2024

Robert Wayne Smith (14 May 1946 – 8 December 2024) was a New Zealand cricketer. He played 33 first-class and 11 List A matches for Wellington between 1968 and 1977.

After his playing career, he served as a selector for Wellington and as vice-president of Cricket Wellington. He died in 2024, at the age of 78.

== See also ==
- List of Wellington representative cricketers
