= Joe Austin-Smellie =

New Zealand cricketer (born 1989)

Personal information
- Born: 17 October 1989 (age 37); Dunedin, New Zealand
- Source: Cricinfo, 23 October 2020

Joe Austin-Smellie (born 17 October 1989) is a New Zealand cricketer and coach. He played in sixteen first-class and nine List A matches for Wellington from 2009 to 2011. He has served as Assistant Coach for the Wellington Blaze (2024/25) and more recently the Wellington Firebirds.

== See also ==
- List of Wellington representative cricketers
