= George Baker (New Zealand cricketer) =

New Zealand cricketer

Personal information
- Full name: Edward George Huia Baker
- Born: 15 September 1895; Ōtaki, New Zealand
- Died: 15 May 1962 (aged 66); Christchurch, New Zealand
- Source: Cricinfo, 23 October 2020

Edward George Huia Baker (15 September 1895 – 15 May 1962) was a New Zealand cricketer. He played in four first-class matches for Wellington from 1919 to 1921.

Baker was born on 15 September 1895 in Ōtaki. His parents were Edward and Margaret Riddel Baker.

Baker died on 15 May 1962 in Christchurch. His wife, Vera Alma Baker, had died before him. He was buried at Memorial Park Cemetery.

== See also ==
- List of Wellington representative cricketers
