= James Moss (cricketer) =

New Zealand cricketer (born 1945)

Personal information
- Born: 5 December 1945 (age 80); Invercargill, New Zealand
- Source: Cricinfo, 27 October 2020

James Moss (born 5 December 1945) is a New Zealand cricketer. He played in six first-class matches for Wellington from 1965 to 1970.

== See also ==
- List of Wellington representative cricketers
