= Kevin Marshall (cricketer) =

New Zealand cricketer (born 1958)

Personal information
- Full name: Kevin Brian Marshall
- Born: 25 April 1958 (age 68); Wellington, New Zealand
- Source: Cricinfo, 24 October 2020

Kevin Brian Marshall (born 25 April 1958) is a New Zealand cricketer. He played in one first-class and four List A matches for Wellington in 1983/84.

== See also ==
- List of Wellington representative cricketers
