= Henry McKenzie (cricketer) =

New Zealand cricketer

Personal information
- Born: 29 May 1855; Wellington, New Zealand
- Died: 13 November 1918 (aged 63); Wellington, New Zealand
- Source: Cricinfo, 24 October 2020

Henry McKenzie (29 May 1855 – 13 November 1918) was a New Zealand cricketer. He played in one first-class match for Wellington in 1876/77.

== See also ==
- List of Wellington representative cricketers
