= Alexander Roberts (cricketer) =

New Zealand cricketer

Personal information
- Born: 1 October 1939; Napier, New Zealand
- Died: 6 November 2017 (aged 78); Hastings, New Zealand
- Nickname: Lucky
- Batting: Right-handed

Domestic team information
- Years: Team
- 1959 to 1964: Wellington
- Source: Cricinfo, 27 October 2020

Alexander Roberts (1 October 1939 – 6 November 2017) was a New Zealand cricketer. He played in seven first-class matches for Wellington between late 1959 and early 1964.

A batsman, Roberts' highest first-class score was 49 for Wellington against Central Districts in the 1963–64 season. A few weeks earlier, in a senior club match in Wellington, he had scored 137 in 73 minutes.

== See also ==
- List of Wellington representative cricketers
