= Ricky Rotch =

New Zealand cricketer (born 1966)

Personal information
- Born: 8 September 1966 (age 60); Dunedin, New Zealand
- Source: Cricinfo, 27 October 2020

Ricky Rotch (born 8 September 1966) is a New Zealand cricketer. He played in one first-class match for Wellington in 1993/94.

== See also ==
- List of Wellington representative cricketers
