= Phil McMahon =

New Zealand cricketer (born 1960)

Personal information
- Born: 11 November 1960 (age 66); Wellington, New Zealand
- Source: Cricinfo, 24 October 2020

Phil McMahon (born 11 November 1960) is a New Zealand cricketer. He played in one List A match for Wellington in 1994/95.

== See also ==
- List of Wellington representative cricketers
