= Arthur Edgar =

New Zealand cricketer

Personal information
- Born: 22 May 1924; Auckland, New Zealand
- Died: 21 April 1992 (aged 67); Wellington, New Zealand
- Relatives: Bruce Edgar (son)
- Source: Cricinfo, 24 October 2020

Arthur Edgar (22 May 1924 – 21 April 1992) was a New Zealand cricketer. He played in three first-class matches for Wellington in 1955/56.

== See also ==
- List of Wellington representative cricketers
