= William Mowatt =

New Zealand cricketer

Personal information
- Born: 29 May 1885; Port Chalmers, New Zealand
- Died: 30 June 1943 (aged 58); Dunedin, New Zealand
- Source: Cricket Archive, 27 October 2020

William Mowatt (29 May 1885 – 30 June 1943) was a New Zealand cricketer. He played in one first-class match for Wellington in 1903/04.

== See also ==
- List of Wellington representative cricketers
