= Ernest Edmunds =

New Zealand cricketer

Personal information
- Born: 11 August 1846; Worthing, England
- Died: 8 September 1920 (aged 74); Wellington, New Zealand
- Source: Cricinfo, 24 October 2020

Ernest Edmunds (11 August 1846 – 8 September 1920) was an English-born New Zealand cricketer. He played in two first-class matches as wicketkeeper for Wellington from 1875 to 1877.

== See also ==
- List of Wellington representative cricketers
