= Adrian Griffith =

Adrian Griffith may refer to:

- Adrian Griffith (cricketer) (born 1971), former West Indies cricketer
- Adrian Griffith (athlete) (born 1984), Bahamian sprinter

== See also ==
- Adrian Griffiths (disambiguation)
