= Fred Rogers (cricketer) =

New Zealand cricketer

Personal information
- Born: 10 July 1918; New Plymouth, New Zealand
- Died: 7 August 1998 (aged 80); Lower Hutt, New Zealand
- Source: Cricinfo, 27 October 2020

Fred Rogers (10 July 1918 – 7 August 1998) was a New Zealand cricketer. He played in one first-class match for Wellington in 1941/42.

== See also ==
- List of Wellington representative cricketers
