= George Day (cricketer) =

New Zealand cricketer

Personal information
- Born: 1 October 1879; Wellington, New Zealand
- Died: 7 August 1953 (aged 73); Wellington, New Zealand
- Source: Cricinfo, 24 October 2020

George Day (1 October 1879 – 7 August 1953) was a New Zealand cricketer. He played in one first-class match for Wellington in 1903/04.

== See also ==
- List of Wellington representative cricketers
