= Edward Fitzsimmons =

New Zealand cricketer (1869–1942)

Personal information
- Born: 1869
- Died: 28 January 1942 (aged 72–73); Wanganui, New Zealand
- Batting: Right-handed
- Bowling: Right-arm off-spin

Domestic team information
- Years: Team
- 1889/90–1895/96: Wellington

Career statistics
Competition	First-class
Matches	15
Runs scored	134
Batting average	6.70
100s/50s	0/0
Top score	19
Balls bowled	1,636
Wickets	33
Bowling average	20.69
5 wickets in innings	1
10 wickets in match	0
Best bowling	5/39
Catches/stumpings	12/–
- Source: Cricinfo, 12 April 2019

Edward Fitzsimmons (1869 – 28 January 1942) was a New Zealand cricketer who played first-class cricket for Wellington from 1890 to 1896.

Fitzsimmons was an off-spin bowler and excellent slips fieldsman. In 1890–91, on the first day of his second first-class match, against Canterbury, 31 wickets fell for 242 runs as he helped dismiss Canterbury twice with 4 for 8 and 2 for 25; Wellington won by eight wickets early on the second day. He took his best figures of 5 for 39 (9 for 66 in the match) in Wellington's victory over Hawke's Bay two seasons later.

He worked as a telegraphist with the Post and Telegraph Department.
