= Jeremy Dean (cricketer) =

New Zealand cricketer (born 1985)

Personal information
- Born: 5 September 1985 (age 41); Wellington, New Zealand
- Source: Cricinfo, 24 October 2020

Jeremy Dean (born 5 September 1985) was a New Zealand cricketer. He played in two List A and four Twenty20 matches for Wellington in 2009.

== See also ==
- List of Wellington representative cricketers
