= Toivo Vaikvee =

New Zealand cricketer (born 1947)

Personal information
- Full name: Toivo Vaikvee
- Born: 7 June 1947 (age 79); Esbjerg, Denmark
- Batting: Right-handed
- Bowling: Legbreak

Domestic team information
- Years: Team
- 1973–1976: Wellington

Career statistics
Competition	FC
Matches	11
Runs scored	157
Batting average	17.44
100s/50s	0/0
Top score	41*
Balls bowled	477
Wickets	14
Bowling average	34.07
5 wickets in innings	0
10 wickets in match	0
Best bowling	4/41
Catches/stumpings	4/–
- Source: Cricinfo, 24 February 2010

Toivo Vaikvee (born 7 June 1947 in Esbjerg, Denmark) is a former New Zealand cricketer who played for Wellington in the Plunket Shield and Shell Trophy during the 1970s.

After attending Palmerston North Boys' High School, where he captained the First XI, he worked in the insurance business. A leg-spinner, his best performance in first-class cricket was for Wellington against Northern Districts in 1973–74, when he took 4 for 41 and 3 for 99 in a 98-run victory. He played Hawke Cup cricket for Manawatu in the 1960s.
