= Arthur Hawthorne =

Domestic team information
- Years: Team
- 1906/07–1909/10: Wellington
- Source: Cricinfo, 24 October 2020

Arthur Hawthorne was a New Zealand cricketer. He played in four first-class matches in New Zealand for Wellington between the 1906–07 season and 1909–10.

Hawthorne was educated at Mount Cook School in Wellington. (Note: Both Tony McCarron and CricketArchive give Hawthorne's date of birth as 1873 and his place of birth as Mount Moriac in Victoria, Australia. This would appear to be incorrect.) He played club cricket in the city for the Gas Company side as a batsman, He captained the side during the 1905–06 season, during which he was described as "young and full of energy", and by the start of the following season was a member of the club's match committee.

Considered by the press to be "one of the foremost of Wellington's batsmen", Hawthorne made his representative debut in a February 1905 match between the touring Australians and a side of 15 players fielded by Wellington. His first-class debut came in December 1906 against the touring MCC side at the Basin Reserve. He scored 11 runs in his only innings on debut before recording a pair against Canterbury later in the season and a duck in another match against MCC. His final first-class appearance came against Canterbury in January 1910, with Hawthorne making his highest first-class score of 18 runs and taking his only first-class wicket during the match.
