= John Tarleton (cricketer) =

New Zealand cricketer

Personal information
- Born: 29 June 1852; New Norfolk, Van Diemen's Land
- Died: 31 December 1929 (aged 77); Hobart, Tasmania, Australia
- Source: Cricinfo, 27 October 2020

John Tarleton (29 June 1852 – 31 December 1929) was a New Zealand cricketer. He played in one first-class match for Wellington in 1884/85.

== See also ==
- List of Wellington representative cricketers
