= Bill Rainbird =

New Zealand cricketer

Personal information
- Full name: William Gerald Rainbird
- Born: 9 April 1916; Wellington, New Zealand
- Died: 27 September 1997 (aged 81); Kenepuru, Porirua, New Zealand
- Batting: Right-handed

Domestic team information
- Years: Team
- 1934-35 to 1946-47: Wellington

Career statistics
Competition	First-class
Matches	10
Runs scored	492
Batting average	25.89
100s/50s	1/2
Top score	102
Balls bowled	30
Wickets	0
Bowling average	–
5 wickets in innings	–
10 wickets in match	–
Best bowling	–
Catches/stumpings	5/–
- Source: Cricinfo, 7 December 2017

William Gerald Rainbird (9 April 1916 – 27 September 1997) was a New Zealand cricketer who played first-class cricket for Wellington from 1935 to 1946.

Bill Rainbird was a right-handed batsman. He was the second-highest run-scorer in the Plunket Shield in 1938-39, with 280 runs at an average of 56.00, including his only first-class century, 102 against Otago. He was in the New Zealand squad to play the touring Sir Julien Cahn’s XI at the end of the season, in what proved to be New Zealand’s last match before World War II, but he was made twelfth man.

He served in the New Zealand Army during World War II.
