= Nathaniel Werry =

New Zealand cricketer

Personal information
- Full name: Nathaniel William Werry
- Born: 1847; Smyrna, Ottoman Empire
- Died: 26 May 1907 (aged 59–60); Kashmir, India

Domestic team information
- Years: Team
- 1873-74 to 1883-84: Wellington

Career statistics
Competition	First-class
Matches	4
Runs scored	56
Batting average	7.00
100s/50s	0/0
Top score	20
Balls bowled	20
Wickets	0
Bowling average	–
5 wickets in innings	–
10 wickets in match	–
Best bowling	–
Catches/stumpings	2/–
- Source: Cricinfo, 3 January 2020

Nathaniel William Werry (1847 – 26 May 1907) was a New Zealand cricketer who played first-class cricket for Wellington between 1874 and 1884.

== Life and career ==
Born in the Ottoman Empire and educated at the Royal Military College, Sandhurst, Werry moved to New Zealand in young adulthood. According to the New Zealand cricket historian Tom Reese, Werry was "one of the biggest hitters ever seen in the Colony". In 1871 his big hitting virtually won the match against Nelson on his own, scoring 15 not out and 22 not out, the two top scores in a match in which 35 wickets fell for 169 runs in one day.

His best innings came when the touring English team played three matches on the way home from Australia in 1888, including a match against a Wellington XXII. In Wellington's second innings Werry went to the wicket with the score at 144 for 17 and Wellington heading for defeat, but, "with the utmost cheerfulness", he struck a quick 53 not out, driving and cutting with such vigour that several fieldsmen had to be moved to the outfield to prevent boundaries. There was insufficient time left after his innings for the English team to make the runs required to win, and the match was drawn. No other Wellington batsman made more than 21.

Werry also captained the Wellington rugby team in the 1870s. He later served as a vice-president of the Wellington Cricket Association, and was also connected with several other sporting organisations in Wellington.

In 1878 he left his position as Record Clerk in the Public Works Department to take up the position of Chief Clerk in the Railway Department. In 1879 he was appointed Under Secretary for Railways. Later he left the public service and became secretary of the Wellington Club.

In January 1887 Werry married Mary Reader, a widow, in Wellington. He returned to England in the late 1890s. In 1907 he was travelling in Kashmir, India, when he died of cholera. He and Mary had a daughter, Daphne, who died in London in 1916 at the age of 27.
