= Arthur George (cricketer) =

New Zealand cricketer

Personal information
- Full name: Arthur Andrew George
- Born: 28 July 1866; Australia
- Died: 2 May 1931 (aged 64); Wellington, New Zealand

Domestic team information
- Years: Team
- 1913/14: Wellington
- Source: CricketArchive, 24 October 2020

Arthur Andrew George (28 July 1866 – 2 May 1931) was a New Zealand businessman and cricketer. He played in one first-class match for Wellington during the 1913–14 season.

George was born in Australia in 1866. (Note: Sources disagree as to George's birthplace within Australia, with both South Australia and Victoria given.) He emigrated to New Zealand during the 1890s, establishing a drapery business with his brother Lance at Wellington and Petone. A keen sportsman, George played cricket in Melbourne and in Wellington was a member of Midland Cricket Club. He played one representative match for the Wellington side, a February 1914 fixture against Hawke's Bay. He scored 16 first-class runs, making nine in his first innings and seven in his second.

As well as cricket, George played tennis at Newtown Tennis Club, where he served as the club's president for a time, and was the patron of Evans Bay Yacht and Motor Boat Club. He was a prominent free mason, playing a role in establishing the Mokoia Lodge in Wellington and serving as treasurer of the Grand Lodge of New Zealand. He was married with three children, two sons and a daughter. Both of his sons were commissioned in the New Zealand Army during World War II, serving in North Africa and Europe.

George died at Wellington in May 1931, following a short illness. He was aged 64 and had run the family drapery firm alone for two years following his brothers retirement. His sons continued to run the business as partners following George's death.
