= Alex Newman =

New Zealand cricketer

Personal information
- Born: 24 March 1909; Nelson, New Zealand
- Died: 2 June 1992 (aged 83); Nelson, New Zealand
- Source: Cricinfo, 27 October 2020

Alex Newman (24 March 1909 – 2 June 1992) was a New Zealand cricketer. He played in two first-class matches for Wellington in 1930/31.

== See also ==
- List of Wellington representative cricketers
