= Arthur Motley =

English cricketer

Arthur Motley (5 February 1858 – 28 September 1897) was an English amateur first-class cricketer, who played two matches for Yorkshire County Cricket Club in 1879 and five for Wellington in New Zealand in the late 1880s.

Motley was born in Osmondthorpe, Leeds, Yorkshire, and was a right-handed batsman and right-arm fast bowler. For Yorkshire he took seven wickets at 19.28 and scored 10 runs at 10.00. He lived in New Zealand for a period, playing five first-class matches for Wellington between 1886 and 1889. He scored 18 and 58 not out, the highest score on either side, when Wellington beat Nelson by 13 runs in 1886–87. He was awarded a gold watch for being the best batsman in senior Wellington cricket in the 1886–87 season.

Motley died in September 1897 in Canning Town, Essex, aged 39.
