= Robert Moss (New Zealand cricketer) =

New Zealand cricketer

Personal information
- Born: 13 November 1884; Wellington, New Zealand
- Died: 21 May 1932 (aged 47); Masterton, New Zealand
- Source: Cricinfo, 27 October 2020

Robert Moss (13 November 1884 – 21 May 1932) was a New Zealand cricketer. He played in one first-class match for Wellington in 1903/04.

== See also ==
- List of Wellington representative cricketers
