= Wallace Bain (cricketer) =

New Zealand cricketer

Personal information
- Full name: Wallace Gordon Collingwood Bain
- Born: 1 June 1917; Auckland, New Zealand
- Died: 17 June 2005 (aged 88); Auckland, New Zealand
- Source: Cricinfo, 23 October 2020

Wallace Gordon Collingwood Bain (1 June 1917 – 17 June 2005) was a New Zealand cricketer. He played in eight first-class matches for Wellington from 1937 to 1945.

== See also ==
- List of Wellington representative cricketers
