= Arthur Aldersley =

New Zealand cricketer

Personal information
- Full name: William Arthur Aldersley
- Born: 4 December 1888; Keighley, Yorkshire, England
- Died: 17 March 1981 (aged 92); Lower Hutt, New Zealand

Domestic team information
- Years: Team
- 1909/10–1922/23: Wellington
- Source: CricketArchive, 23 October 2020

William Arthur Aldersley (4 December 1888 – 17 March 1981) was a New Zealand cricketer. He played in six first-class matches for Wellington between the 1909–10 season and 1922–23.

Aldersley was born at Keighley in Yorkshire in 1888. His family emigrated to New Zealand when he was a child and he was educated at Mount Cook School in Wellington. He was a founding member of Lower Hutt Cricket Club and played regularly for the team for more than 25 years. Considered one of the best all-rounders in local cricket, he was described by The Dominion in 1930 as "a really good batsman, a clever slow spin bowler and a useful fieldsman" as well as "a most likeable personality".

Aldersley made his representative debut for Wellington in a March 1910 match against Hawke's Bay in Napier, making scores of 11 in his first innings and 38 not out in his second. He played once against Auckland during the 1913–14 season, before making four appearances for Wellington in the years following World War I. In his six first-class matches Aldersley scored 133 runs and took eight wickets. His best bowling figures were 4 for 47 in his first Plunket Shield match against Auckland in January 1920. His highest score of 48 runs was made in his final first-class match, a February 1923 Plunket Shield match against Canterbury at Lancaster Park. Playing for Hutt in a senior club match in Wellington in March 1920, he took all 10 wickets in an innings.

In 1931, Aldersley was elected as the chair of the Wellington selection committee. He served on the management committees of the Lower Hutt club and the Wellington Cricket Association for a number of years, and umpired three first-class matches, all at Wellington's Basin Reserve, between 1936 and 1940.

Aldersley worked as a dispensing chemist. He married Myrtle Olive Wilton in Wellington in October 1910. He died at Lower Hutt in 1981 aged 92. An obituary was published in the 1981 New Zealand Cricket Almanack.
