= Fraser Quarterman =

New Zealand cricketer (born 1983)

Personal information
- Full name: Fraser James Quarterman
- Born: 27 June 1983 (age 43); Wellington, New Zealand
- Batting: Right-handed
- Bowling: Left-arm medium–fast
- Role: Batsman

Domestic team information
- Years: Team
- 2007/08: Wellington
- FC debut: 28 November 2007 Wellington v Canterbury
- Last FC: 15 March 2008 Wellington v Otago

Career statistics
Competition	First-class
Matches	3
Runs scored	70
Batting average	17.50
100s/50s	0/0
Top score	47
Balls bowled	276
Wickets	3
Bowling average	46.66
5 wickets in innings	0
10 wickets in match	0
Best bowling	1/26
Catches/stumpings	1/–
- Source: CricInfo, 17 September 2008

Fraser James Quarterman (born 27 June 1983) is a former New Zealand cricketer who played for Wellington and Essex's 2nd XI.

Quarterman was born in Wellington and educated there at St Patrick's College and Massey University. A right-handed batsman and left-arm medium-fast bowler, he played his debut match for Wellington against Canterbury on 1 December 2007, scoring three runs and taking a wicket in each innings.

Quarterman works for the fitness company Barry's in the US. He was appointed Vice President, West Coast Operations from 2020, and in 2026 became Vice President Operations.
