= Dick Staples =

New Zealand cricketer (1878–1954)

Personal information
- Full name: Arthur Staples
- Born: 8 January 1878; Wellington, New Zealand
- Died: 13 August 1954 (aged 76); Wellington, New Zealand
- Nickname: Dick
- Role: Batsman

Domestic team information
- Years: Team
- 1901/02–1903/04: Wellington

Career statistics
Competition	First-class
Matches	4
Runs scored	221
Batting average	31.57
100s/50s	0/2
Top score	78
Balls bowled	186
Wickets	5
Bowling average	16.20
5 wickets in innings	0
10 wickets in match	0
Best bowling	3/48
Catches/stumpings	0/–
- Source: Cricinfo, 15 December 2023

Arthur "Dick" Staples (8 January 1878 – 13 August 1954) was a New Zealand cricketer. He played in four first-class matches for Wellington from 1901 to 1904.

Staples was born in Wellington. He attended Wellington College, and worked in Wellington as a bootmaker.

Staples had a reputation in Wellington cricket as a "stonewaller" – an unadventurous, careful batsman. He was Wellington's most successful batsman on their short northern tour of December 1903. He was their top scorer in the first match, a loss to Hawke's Bay, when he opened in the first innings and scored 78 in four and a half hours; in the second innings he went in at number six and made 31 not out. He was the highest scorer on either side in the second match, when Wellington defeated Auckland, making 67 in three and three-quarter hours in the first innings. With 212 runs at an average of 42.40, he was the third-highest run-getter in the New Zealand season. However, he played no further first-class matches.

Staples died in Wellington on 13 August 1954, aged 76. He had been predeceased by his wife, Eva Ethel Staples, in 1951.
