= Adrian Griffiths (New Zealand cricketer) =

New Zealand cricketer (born 1951)

Personal information
- Born: 23 May 1951 (age 75); Blenheim, New Zealand
- Source: Cricinfo, 24 October 2020

Adrian Griffiths (born 23 May 1951) is a New Zealand cricketer. He played in three first-class matches for Wellington from 1984 to 1986.

== See also ==
- List of Wellington representative cricketers
