= David Molony (cricketer) =

New Zealand cricketer (born 1966)

- Born: David Matthew Molony; 30 May 1966 (age 58); Wellington, New Zealand
- Occupation: Cricketer (formerly)

David Matthew Molony (born 30 May 1966 in Wellington) is a former New Zealand cricketer who played first-class cricket for Wellington from 1986 to 1988.

Molony appeared in ten first-class matches as a right-arm fast-medium bowler, taking 18 wickets at an average of 36.27. His best bowling figures were 3 for 62 and 3 for 69 against Canterbury in 1985–86, when he also made his highest score of 14 not out, batting in his usual position at number 11. He also played three List A matches in 1993–94.
