= Owen Williams (Australian cricketer) =

Australian cricketer

Personal information
- Full name: Owen Charles Williams
- Born: 20 June 1847; Impression Bay, Van Diemen's Land
- Died: 12 November 1917 (aged 70); Kandy, Ceylon

Domestic team information
- Years: Team
- 1871–1876: Victoria
- Source: Cricinfo, 6 June 2015

Owen Williams (20 June 1847 – 18 November 1917) was an Australian cricketer. He played four first-class cricket matches for Victoria between 1871 and 1876. He also played in one first-class match for Wellington 1884/85.

== See also ==
- List of Victoria first-class cricketers
