= John Bryce (cricketer) =

New Zealand cricketer

Personal information
- Born: c. 1849; Inverness, Scotland
- Died: 13 June 1878 (aged 28–29); Wellington, New Zealand
- Source: Cricinfo, 23 October 2020

John Bryce (c. 1849 – 13 June 1878) was a New Zealand cricketer. He played in one first-class match for Wellington in 1876/77.

== See also ==
- List of Wellington representative cricketers
