= Alexander Littlejohn =

New Zealand cricketer (1860–1910)

Personal information
- Full name: Alexander Ironside Littlejohn
- Born: 1860; Scotland
- Died: 25 May 1910 (aged 49–50); Wellington, New Zealand

Domestic team information
- Years: Team
- 1887/88–1889/90: Wellington
- Source: Cricinfo, 24 October 2020

Alexander Ironside Littlejohn (1860 – 25 May 1910) was a New Zealand jeweller, chess player and cricketer. He played in two first-class cricket matches for Wellington, one in each of the 1887–88 and 1888–90 seasons.

Born in Scotland in 1860, Littlejohn apprenticed with his father as a jeweller and watchmaker before the family moved to New Zealand in 1879. Wilson, his father, established the firm of W Littlejohn and Son at Lambton Quay in Wellington; the business was taken over by his son during the 1890s. The firm manufactured the clock for the post office building in Wellington and had a reputation throughout New Zealand.

Littlejohn's representative cricket debut for Wellington came in a December 1887 match against Nelson. He made scores of four and five not out on debut and the following March was one of 22 Wellington players in a non-first-class match against Arthur Shrewsbury's English touring side at the Basin Reserve. His final first-class match was a December 1889 fixture against Canterbury at Hagley Oval in Christchurch. He scored 13 not out in Wellington's first innings and opened the batting in their second, being dismissed for a single run.

A founder of the Metropolitan Building and Investment Society in Wellington, Littlejohn was the society's chairman for a number of years. He was one of New Zealand's leading chess players, was considered "well known" throughout the country, and was a member of the council of the New Zealand chess association. He was a vice-president of Wellington Chess Club, and played lawn bowls at Kelburne Bowling Club. Married with two daughters, he died at Wellington in 1910 after being ill for some time with heart disease.
