= Gilbert Howe =

New Zealand cricketer

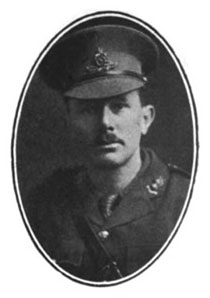

Personal information
- Born: 6 August 1891; Wellington, New Zealand
- Died: 10 January 1917 (aged 25); Messines, West Flanders, Belgium
- Batting: Left-handed
- Role: Wicket-keeper

Domestic team information
- Years: Team
- 1913/14: Wellington

Career statistics
Competition	First-class
Matches	5
Runs scored	139
Batting average	15.44
100s/50s	0/0
Top score	31
Catches/stumpings	5/4
- Source: Cricinfo, 31 October 2019

Gilbert Howe (6 August 1891 – 10 January 1917) was a New Zealand cricketer who played five matches of first-class cricket for Wellington in the 1913–14 season. He died in World War I.

Howe was a wicketkeeper and a useful lower-order batsman. He worked as a clerk in the Wellington City Council rates office. He enlisted at the outbreak of World War I, and served as a sergeant in the New Zealand forces that took Samoa in 1914. Later in New Zealand he was commissioned, and he served on the Western Front as a lieutenant. He was killed in action at Messines on 10 January 1917.

After Howe's death his family donated a trophy in his name that was awarded annually until World War II to the most improved player in Wellington cricket.
