= James Dees (cricketer) =

English cricketer

Personal information
- Born: 1845; Bedlington, England
- Died: 1911 (aged 65–66); Whitehaven, England
- Source: Cricinfo, 24 October 2020

James Dees (1845 – 1911) was an English cricketer. He played in two first-class matches in New Zealand for Wellington in 1873/74.

== See also ==
- List of Wellington representative cricketers
