= W. J. Wagstaffe =

New Zealand cricketer

Cricket information
- Role: Wicket-keeper

Domestic team information
- Years: Team
- 1913-14 to 1919-20: Wellington

Career statistics
Competition	First-class
Matches	4
Runs scored	77
Batting average	11.00
100s/50s	0/0
Top score	17
Balls bowled	0
Wickets	–
Bowling average	–
5 wickets in innings	–
10 wickets in match	–
Best bowling	–
Catches/stumpings	5/2
- Source: Cricinfo, 31 October 2019

W. J. Wagstaffe (birth and death details unknown) was a New Zealand cricketer who played four matches of first-class cricket for Wellington between 1914 and 1920.

Wagstaffe was a wicket-keeper and middle-order batsman. In the 1918–19 Wellington club season he scored a century and put on a partnership of 307 with Syd Hiddleston, a record for Wellington cricket. In the 1923–24 season he hit 210 in an afternoon in a senior Wellington club match at the Basin Reserve.
