= Walter Chisholm (cricketer) =

New Zealand cricketer

Personal information
- Born: 1 August 1862; Wellington, New Zealand
- Died: 1 August 1957 (aged 95); Dunedin, New Zealand
- Source: Cricinfo, 24 October 2020

Walter Chisholm (1 August 1862 – 1 August 1957) was a New Zealand cricketer. He played in one first-class match for Wellington in 1885/86.

== See also ==
- List of Wellington representative cricketers
