= Kenneth Parkin =

New Zealand cricketer

Personal information
- Born: 20 February 1921; Wellington, New Zealand
- Died: 2 July 1973 (aged 52); Wellington, New Zealand
- Batting: Right-handed
- Bowling: Slow left-arm orthodox

Domestic team information
- Years: Team
- 1945/46: Wellington
- Source: Cricinfo, 27 October 2020

Kenneth Parkin (20 February 1921 – 2 July 1973) was a New Zealand cricketer. He played in two first-class matches, one during the 1942–43 season for a New Zealand Air Force side and once during the 1945–46 season for Wellington.

Parkin as born at Wellington in 1921 and was educated at Rongotai College in the city. He served in the Royal New Zealand Air Force during World War II, playing cricket for the Air Force side. On his first-class debut against a New Zealand Army side at Lancaster Park in Christchurch in April 1943 he took three wickets and scored 11 runs in his first innings before recording a duck in his second. After the end of World War II he played a second first-class match during the 1945–46 season, taking a single wicket and again scoring 11 and 0 in his two innings for Wellington against Auckland at Eden Park.

Professionally Parkin worked as a company director. He died at Wellington in 1973 aged 52. An obituary was published in that year's edition of the New Zealand Cricket Almanack.
