= William Fordham =

English cricketer

Personal information
- Full name: William Alfred Fordham
- Born: c. 1836; Broxbourne, Hertfordshire, England
- Died: 7 October 1913 (aged 77); Kilbirnie, Wellington, New Zealand
- Source: CricketArchive, 19 September 2022

William Alfred Fordham (c. 1836 – 7 October 1913) was a cricketer, born in England, who played in one first-class match in New Zealand for Wellington in 1877–78.

Born in Hertfordshire, Fordham was one of the founding members of Middlesex County Cricket Club. He was an active amateur cricketer in England before emigrating to New Zealand in 1876 and settling in Wellington. He played successfully for Wellington in several minor matches in 1877–78 as an all-rounder. In April 1878, in his only first-class match, he opened the batting in the first innings and made 1, then went in last in the second innings and top-scored with 13 not out; he also took one wicket.

Fordham was married in Middlesex in January 1860. He died at his home in the Wellington suburb of Kilbirnie in October 1913, aged 77. He was survived by his wife Elizabeth and their son and daughter.
