= Jack Ashenden =

New Zealand cricketer

Personal information
- Full name: Jack Gilbert Ashenden
- Born: 12 May 1911; Wellington, New Zealand
- Died: 14 November 1992 (aged 81); Sydney, Australia
- Batting: Right-handed
- Bowling: Right-arm medium

Domestic team information
- Years: Team
- 1935/36–1944/45: Wellington

Career statistics
Competition	First-class
Matches	16
Runs scored	160
Batting average	7.61
100s/50s	0/0
Top score	27
Balls bowled	3,082
Wickets	53
Bowling average	28.26
5 wickets in innings	1
10 wickets in match	0
Best bowling	6/44
Catches/stumpings	10/–
- Source: Cricinfo, 6 September 2015

Jack Gilbert Ashenden (12 May 1911 – 14 November 1992) was a New Zealand cricketer who played first-class cricket for Wellington from 1936 to 1945.

A right-arm medium-pace bowler, Ashenden partnered Tom Pritchard in opening the bowling for Wellington in the 1938-39 Plunket Shield, when he and Pritchard were two of only six players in the competition to take 10 wickets or more. He took 6 for 44 in the second innings of the innings victory over Otago. At the end of the season he played for New Zealand against Sir Julien Cahn's XI. He had a long career in senior Wellington cricket, taking 846 wickets by the time he retired in 1957.

Ashenden married Joyce Hurren in the late 1930s, and they lived in Wellington.
