= Timothy Vogel =

New Zealand cricketer (born 1960)

Timothy Grant Vogel (born 11 July 1960) is a former New Zealand cricketer who played four first-class and three List A cricket matches for Wellington in the 1980s. He also played for Hutt Valley in the Hawke Cup. He was born in Upper Hutt.
