= Graham Murray (cricketer) =

New Zealand cricketer (born 1976)

Personal information
- Full name: Graham Bryan Murray
- Born: 3 October 1976 (age 50); Wellington, New Zealand
- Batting: Right-handed
- Bowling: Right-arm medium-fast

Domestic team information
- Years: Team
- 2004–2005: Wellington

Career statistics
Competition	First-class	List A
Matches	3	3
Runs scored	76	18
Batting average	12.66	18.00
100s/50s	0/0	0/0
Top score	33	15
Balls bowled	228	84
Wickets	0	1
Bowling average	–	58.00
5 wickets in innings	0	0
10 wickets in match	0	0
Best bowling	0/5	1/12
Catches/stumpings	0/–	0/–
- Source: ESPNcricinfo, 1 September 2022

Graham Bryan Murray (born 3 October 1976) is a New Zealand cricketer. He played in three first-class and three List A matches for Wellington in 2004 and 2005.
