= Gary Solomon (New Zealand cricketer) =

New Zealand cricketer (born 1944)

Personal information
- Born: 26 June 1944 (age 82); Lower Hutt, New Zealand
- Source: Cricinfo, 27 October 2020

Gary Solomon (born 26 June 1944) is a New Zealand cricketer. He played in two first-class matches for Wellington in 1966/67.

== See also ==
- List of Wellington representative cricketers
