= Harold Chapman (cricketer) =

New Zealand cricketer

Personal information
- Born: 28 February 1922; Ballygawley, Ireland
- Died: 20 February 2007 (aged 84); Wellington, New Zealand
- Source: Cricinfo, 24 October 2020

Harold Chapman (28 February 1922 – 20 February 2007) was a New Zealand cricketer. He played in five first-class matches for Wellington from 1943 to 1945.

== See also ==
- List of Wellington representative cricketers
