= James Salmon (cricketer) =

New Zealand cricketer

Personal information
- Full name: James Alexander Nathaniel Salmon
- Born: 8 January 1849; Sydney, Australia
- Died: 28 November 1903 (aged 54); Wellington, New Zealand
- Bowling: Right-arm medium-pace

Domestic team information
- Years: Team
- 1873 to 1881: Wellington
- Source: Cricinfo, 27 October 2020

James Salmon (8 January 1849 – 28 November 1903) was a New Zealand cricketer. He played in four first-class matches for Wellington from 1873 to 1881.

Salmon was a right-arm medium-pace bowler. The 1877-78 Australian team considered him Wellington's best bowler.

He worked in Wellington as managing clerk for Chapman & Tripp, barristers, until obliged to give up work in 1901 owing to illness. In November 1903 he died suddenly at home in Wellington of heart failure after a fall. He left two sons and a daughter.

== See also ==
- List of Wellington representative cricketers
