= Frederick Lash =

New Zealand cricketer

Personal information
- Born: 7 April 1870; Cobden, New Zealand
- Died: 10 November 1966 (aged 96); Auckland, New Zealand
- Source: Cricinfo, 24 October 2020

Frederick Lash (7 April 1870 – 10 November 1966) was a New Zealand cricketer. He played in two first-class matches for Wellington from 1893 to 1897.
