= John Lockett (cricketer) =

New Zealand cricketer

Personal information
- Born: 8 September 1854; Muswellbrook, Australia
- Died: 13 September 1929 (aged 75); Whanganui, New Zealand
- Source: Cricinfo, 24 October 2020

John Lockett (8 September 1854 – 13 September 1929) was a New Zealand cricketer. He played in four first-class matches for Wellington from 1874 to 1880.
