= BJ Crook =

New Zealand cricketer (born 1984)

Personal information
- Full name: Brendon-John Crook
- Born: 29 June 1984 (age 42); Lower Hutt, New Zealand
- Batting: Left-handed
- Bowling: Right-arm medium

Domestic team information
- Years: Team
- 2007/08–2009/10: Wellington
- Source: Cricinfo, 24 October 2020

Brendon-John Crook (born 29 June 1984) is a New Zealand cricketer. He played in nine first-class, twelve List A, and six Twenty20 matches for Wellington between the 2007–08 and 2009–10 seasons.

Crook was born at Lower Hutt in 1984 and educated at Hutt Valley High School.

Crook now plays Football for the Petone Stonecutters in Wellingtons Capital 3 division
