= Ernest Beechey =

New Zealand cricketer (1886–1972)

Personal information
- Full name: Ernest Mansfield Beechey
- Born: 15 June 1886; Masterton, New Zealand
- Died: 23 December 1972 (aged 86); Papakura, New Zealand
- Batting: Left-handed

Domestic team information
- Years: Team
- 1906/07–1918/19: Wellington

Career statistics
Competition	First-class
Matches	15
Runs scored	576
Batting average	22.15
100s/50s	1/2
Top score	180
Balls bowled	114
Wickets	4
Bowling average	37.00
5 wickets in innings	0
10 wickets in match	0
Best bowling	2/25
Catches/stumpings	9/–
- Source: Cricinfo, 20 December 2018

Ernest Mansfield Beechey (15 June 1886 – 23 December 1972) was a New Zealand cricketer who played first-class cricket for Wellington between the 1906–07 season and 1918–19. He was a lawyer and a judge.

== Life and career ==
Beechey was born in Masterton and educated at Wellington College. He was a batsman, whose only first-class century came in his last match in March 1919, when he made 180 against Auckland. He and Wiri Baker added 252 for the second wicket, including 194 between lunch and tea on the second day of the match. He was an excellent fieldsman, whether in the slips or in the outfield.

Beechey's 158 in a senior Wellington club match in 1907–08, characterised by powerful drives, was widely regarded as the best innings in the competition that season. In a non-first-class interprovincial match in 1910–11 he scored 112 for Wairarapa against Nelson, reaching his century in 61 minutes. He was secretary of the Wellington Cricket Association in 1913–14.

Beechey was admitted as a solicitor in April 1911. He worked as a barrister and solicitor in Hāwera in the 1930s. He was appointed a judge of the Waikato-Maniapoto Native Land Court District in May 1941.

Beechey died at Papakura on 23 December 1972, and his ashes were scattered at Waikumete Cemetery on 27 December.
