= Arthur Palethorpe =

New Zealand cricketer

Arthur Lissant Palethorpe (1854 – 23 July 1916) was a New Zealand cricketer who played for Wellington. Palethorpe made a single first-class appearance for the side, during the 1879–80 season, against Nelson. From the tailend, he failed to score a run in either innings in which he batted.

Born in Liverpool, Palethorpe married Elizabeth Bilson in Everton in August 1875. He moved to New Zealand later in the 1870s. Under the name Arthur Lissant he was a prominent performer in the first productions of many of the Gilbert & Sullivan operettas in Australia and New Zealand.
