= Stanley Newman (cricketer) =

New Zealand cricketer

Personal information
- Born: 28 August 1907; Nelson, New Zealand
- Died: 20 August 1956 (aged 48); Nelson, New Zealand
- Source: Cricinfo, 27 October 2020

Stanley Newman (28 August 1907 – 20 August 1956) was a New Zealand cricketer. He played in one first-class match for Wellington in 1929/30.

== See also ==
- List of Wellington representative cricketers
