= Arthur Fenton (cricketer) =

Australian cricketer

Personal information
- Born: 27 February 1870; Tarnagulla, Victoria, Australia
- Died: 20 May 1950 (aged 80); Melbourne, Australia
- Batting: Right-handed
- Bowling: Right-arm off-spin

Domestic team information
- Years: Team
- 1895/96: Victoria
- 1903/04–1910/11: Hawke's Bay
- 1911/12–1914/15: Wellington

Career statistics
Competition	First-class
Matches	14
Runs scored	195
Batting average	8.12
100s/50s	0/0
Top score	39
Balls bowled	2,268
Wickets	50
Bowling average	25.08
5 wickets in innings	2
10 wickets in match	0
Best bowling	6/41
Catches/stumpings	6/–
- Source: Cricinfo, 28 August 2018

Arthur Fenton (27 February 1870 – 20 May 1950) was an Australian cricketer. He played one first-class cricket match for Victoria in 1896, and after moving to New Zealand in 1903 he played for Hawke's Bay and Wellington.

== Cricket career ==
An off-spin bowler, useful tail-end batsman and brilliant fielder, Fenton played club cricket in Melbourne and Sydney before being engaged as a professional coach by the Hawke's Bay Cricket Association in late 1903. His best bowling performances were 5 for 78 for Hawke's Bay against Auckland in 1904–05 and 6 for 41 and 3 for 91 against Otago in 1908–09. As well as coaching, he was the caretaker at the Napier Recreation Ground.

Fenton left Hawke's Bay in October 1911 to take up a groundsman's position at Athletic Park rugby ground in Wellington. He carried out drainage works that made a great improvement to the condition of the ground in wet weather. Playing for the university club in Wellington senior cricket, he took three hat-tricks during the 1916–17 season, and finished with 44 wickets at an average of 11.22.

== Personal life ==
Fenton married in Melbourne in 1898. The marriage produced one child, but Fenton went to Sydney without them in 1902, intending to qualify as a dentist. His wife Rhoda divorced him in 1911 on the grounds of desertion.

Fenton returned to Australia in 1920. He died in 1950 in Melbourne, where he lived in Power Street, Hawthorn, with his wife Charlotte.
