= William Quee =

New Zealand cricketer

Personal information
- Full name: Robert William Quee
- Born: 2 September 1877; Wellington, New Zealand
- Died: 25 February 1920 (aged 42); Hāwera, Taranaki, New Zealand
- Role: Batsman

Domestic team information
- Years: Team
- 1899-00 to 1904-05: Wellington

Career statistics
Competition	First-class
Matches	10
Runs scored	189
Batting average	10.50
100s/50s	0/2
Top score	51
Balls bowled	12
Wickets	0
Bowling average	–
5 wickets in innings	–
10 wickets in match	–
Best bowling	–
Catches/stumpings	4/–
- Source: Cricinfo, 23 August 2018

Robert William Quee (2 September 1877 – 25 February 1920) was a New Zealand cricketer who played first-class cricket for Wellington from 1899 to 1904.

William "Billy" Quee was a batsman who played for Midland in the Wellington competition. He was selected to play for Wellington in December 1899 after consistent batting and safe fielding in club cricket. On his first-class debut against Canterbury he scored 31 and 51, top-scoring in Wellington's second innings when he played "very forcibly", but Canterbury won by one wicket.

He was unable to maintain this form, and although he was a regular member of the Wellington team for the next five years, he seldom again reached double-figures. He remained prominent in Wellington club cricket. In 1901-02 he made the highest score in the Wellington senior club season, 174. In one club match he scored 11 runs off one hit: eight run by the batsmen and three overthrows.

Excessive drinking led Quee into trouble with the law in Wellington in 1915. He later moved to the Ōrongorongo region and then to Hāwera, where he worked as a signwriter. He died at his home in Hāwera of pneumonia at the age of 42.
