= Don Neely =

New Zealand cricketer (1935–2022)

Don Neely MNZM MBE
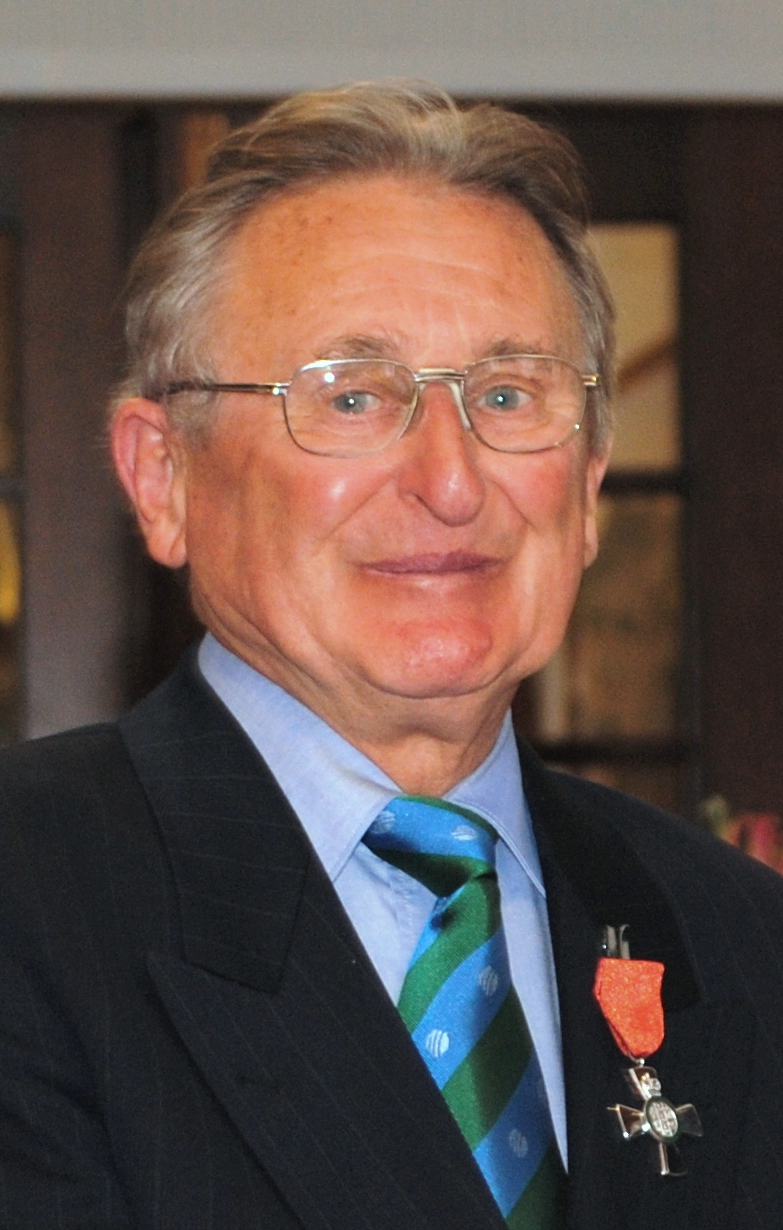
- Neely in 2011

President of New Zealand Cricket
- In office 2006–2009
- Preceded by: John R. Reid
- Succeeded by: Denis Currie

Personal details
- Born: Donald Owen Neely; 21 December 1935 Wellington, New Zealand
- Died: 16 June 2022 (aged 86) Wellington, New Zealand
- Cricket career

Cricket information
- Batting: Right-handed
- Role: Batsman

Domestic team information
- Years: Team
- 1964/65–1967/68: Wellington
- 1968/69–1970/71: Auckland

Career statistics
Competition	First-class
Matches	34
Runs scored	1,301
Batting average	28.91
100s/50s	1/7
Top score	132*
Balls bowled	121
Wickets	1
Bowling average	29.00
5 wickets in innings	0
10 wickets in match	0
Best bowling	1/4
Catches/stumpings	7/–
- Source: Blackcaps.co.nz, 9 April 2009

Donald Owen Neely MNZM MBE (21 December 1935 – 16 June 2022) was a New Zealand cricket historian, administrator and player. He served as President of New Zealand Cricket from 2006 to 2009 and wrote or co-wrote more than 30 books about New Zealand cricket, making him the country's foremost cricket historian.

As a player, Neely had a first-class cricket career spanning 1964 to 1971, during which he played 34 matches for Wellington and Auckland, captaining Wellington to the Plunket Shield title in the 1965/66 season. Beyond playing, he served New Zealand cricket in numerous administrative roles, including 14 years as a national selector and seven as convenor of selectors, as well as trustee and chairman of the New Zealand Cricket Museum. The main scoreboard at the Basin Reserve in Wellington is named in his honour. He was appointed a Member of the Order of the British Empire in the 1995 New Year Honours and a Member of the New Zealand Order of Merit in the 2011 New Year Honours, both for services to cricket.

== Early life ==
Neely was born in Wellington in 1935 and attended Rongotai College from 1947 to 1953, where he played 1st XI cricket. He later played in the senior grade for Wellington's Kilbirnie Cricket Club, which has since amalgamated with Midland St. Pat's and become the Eastern Suburbs Cricket Club. The Eastern Suburbs clubrooms in Kilbirnie Park is now home to the Kilbirnie honours boards that record Neely's successes with the club.

== Playing career ==
Neely's first-class career lasted from 1964 to 1971 and consisted of 34 matches, played in four seasons with Wellington (three as captain) and three seasons with Auckland. He was a right-handed middle-order batsman, and he scored one century and seven fifties in his 1301 runs. His career average was 28.91. In his first year as Wellington's captain, he led the province to Plunket Shield victory.

Neely's first-class career began ten days after his 29th birthday, on 31 December 1964, when he played for Wellington against Canterbury in Christchurch. Neely played 21 first class matches for the team (including 18 Plunket Shield matches), 16 as captain.

For the match against Canterbury, opening batsman Bruce Murray was left out of the team that had played Wellington's first game of the season. Peter Truscott moved from number six to opener to make room in the middle order for Neely. On debut, Neely scored 76 and 27. He played two other Plunket Shield matches that season and finished with 139 runs at an average of 27.8.

In his second season (1965/1966), Neely was named as Wellington's captain and led the team through an unbeaten Plunket Shield season. Wellington defeated Otago, Northern Districts and Auckland, and took first innings points from draws with Central Districts and Canterbury. These results easily made Wellington the competition winners. Neely's batting was modest, with his six innings yielding 128 runs at an average of 25.6. More than half of his season's runs came in his first innings of 74 against Central Districts.

Neely remained captain for the next season, 1966/1967, which was less successful for Wellington. The round robin saw drawn matches against Central Districts and Otago, followed by losses to Canterbury and Auckland. Wellington's sole victory was over Northern Districts in the final round of the competition and the team finished fourth on the points table. Neely batted eight times, scoring three fifties in a total of 216 runs at an average of 27.0. These figures were slightly better than his return in the previous season.

Wellington were fourth again in 1967/1968, despite it being Neely's best season with the bat. His season began with his first and only first-class century, 132* in the first innings against Otago. With 43* in the second innings, this was easily Neely's best batting performance in terms of runs scored. As in the 1965/1966 season, though, he failed to follow a strong start to the season. The 175 runs he scored against Otago were more than half his return for the season: in ten innings he scored 317 runs at an average of 39.62. After the win over Otago, Neely didn't score above 44 as Wellington lost to Central Districts, and drew with Canterbury, Auckland and Northern Districts.

His final match for Wellington began on 29 January 1968, and was against Northern Districts. For the next three seasons, Neely played for Auckland.

Auckland were Plunket Shield champions in 1968/1969. In four innings over four matches, Neely averaged only 14 with a high score of 22.

Neely played all five of Auckland's Plunket Shield games in 1969/1970. With a loss and four draws, Auckland finished fifth. Neely's personal season was successful, however. He batted eight times, scoring 276 runs at an average of 55.2. His three not outs included his best innings (and only 50) of the season, 66* against Central Districts.

Neely's final season as a player was 1970/1971. Auckland's two wins, two draws, and single loss left them third in the Plunket Shield. Neely played in four of those matches, missing the fixture against Central Districts, and scored only 48 runs at an average of 12.0. His last first class match took place over 15–17 January 1971, and was against Canterbury, the province he'd debuted against over six years previously. Neely, at age 35, scored 8 and 21.

== Administration career ==
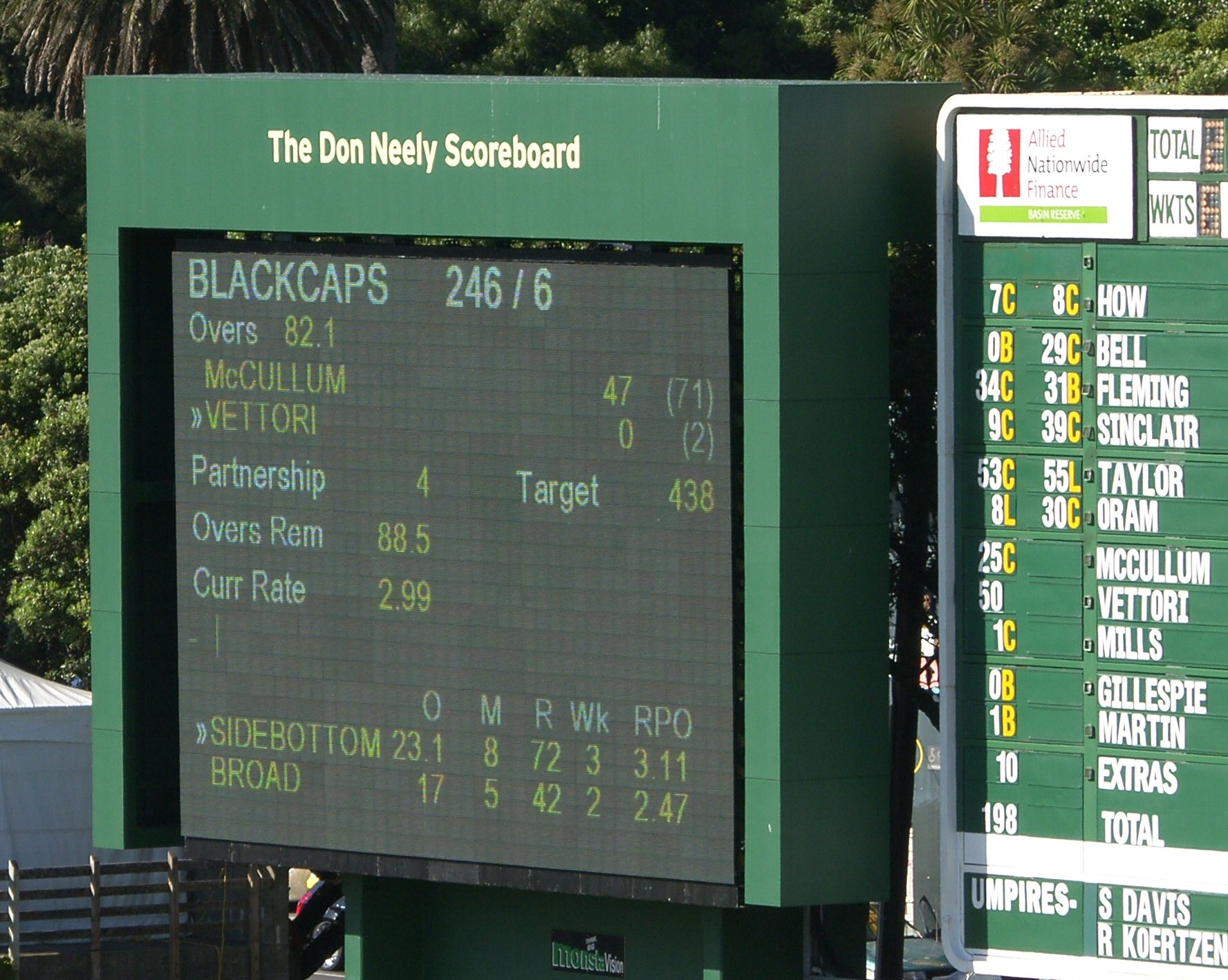
The main scoreboard at the Basin Reserve Wellington is named after Don Neely

Following his retirement from playing, Neely continued to serve cricket in many capacities.

In September 2006, Neely was appointed the president of New Zealand Cricket at NZC's Annual General Meeting in Wellington. He replaced John R. Reid, who had captained Wellington when Neely first played for that province, and who handed that captaincy to Neely when international duty pulled him away from domestic cricket. Neely served three one-year terms, the maximum allowed by the rules of NZC, and was replaced by Denis Currie in 2009.

Neely was a life member of NZC, was both a trustee and chairman of the New Zealand Cricket Museum (serving until 2009), president of Cricket Wellington, and a member of the Basin Reserve Trust.

He spent 14 years as a New Zealand selector, including seven years as convenor of selectors.

On 11 January 2008, the Basin Reserve's new electronic scoreboard was officially opened. It was named the Don Neely Scoreboard, at the insistence of its main benefactor, Ron Brierley.

Neely was appointed a Member of the Order of the British Empire in the 1995 New Year Honours, and a Member of the New Zealand Order of Merit in the 2011 New Year Honours, for services to cricket.

== Historian and author ==
Neely was New Zealand's leading cricket historian and wrote or co-wrote a number of books and cricket annuals. He was a main interviewee in Jeremy Coney's television series The Mantis and the Cricket: Tales from the Tours, which relied heavily on old players (and Neely) to tell stories of early New Zealand cricket teams' tours overseas.

== Personal life ==
Neely's wife Paddianne is an archivist and worked on many of his books. In the 2015 New Year Honours, she was awarded the Queen's Service Medal, for services as an archivist. She is from a cricketing family, with her cousin Dave Crowe being the father of prominent New Zealand batsmen and captains Martin Crowe and Jeff Crowe.

Neely died on 16 June 2022, aged 86.

Neely grew up in Miramar, Wellington, where he played at Crawford Green and was associated with the Kilbirnie Club. He met his wife Paddianne at Masterton Intermediate School in 1960. He later worked as a sales and marketing manager for Rembrandt Suits for many years. His funeral was held at the Basin Reserve. He is survived by Paddianne, their three children and seven grandchildren.

== Bibliography ==
- 100 Summers: The History of Wellington Cricket (1975)
- Men in White: The History of New Zealand International Cricket, 1894–1985 (co-written with Richard King and Francis Payne) (1986)
- The Summer Game – The illustrated history of New Zealand Cricket (written with P.W. Neely) (1994), Moa Publications, Auckland, ISBN 9781869581176
- The Basin: An Illustrated History of the Basin Reserve (co-written with Joseph Romanos) (2003) ISBN 1-877257-05-2
- Men in White: The History of New Zealand International Test Cricket (co-written with Francis Payne) (2008) ISBN 1-86971-095-9

=== Cricket annuals ===
Written and/or edited by Neely:

- DB Cricket Annual (1973), 1972/73 season
- DB Cricket Annual (1974), 1973/74 season
- DB Cricket Annual (1975), 1974/75 season
- DB Cricket Annual (1976), 1975/76 season
- DB Cricket Annual (1977), 1976/77 season ISBN 0-908570-10-4
- DB Cricket Annual 7th Edition (1978), 1977/78 season ISBN 0-908570-23-6
- DB Cricket Annual 8th Edition (1979), 1978/79 season ISBN 0-908570-28-7
- DB Cricket Annual 9th Edition (1980), 1979/80 season
- DB Cricket Annual 10th Edition (1981), 1980/81 season ISBN 0-908570-41-4
- DB Cricket Annual 11th Edition (1982), 1981/82 season ISBN 0-908570-48-1
- DB Cricket Annual 12th Edition (1983), 1982/83 season
- DB Cricket Annual 13th Edition (1984), 1983/84 season
- DB Cricket Annual 14th Edition (1985), 1984/85 season ISBN 0-908570-91-0
- New Zealand Cricket Annual 15th Edition (1986), 1985/86 season ISBN 0-908570-08-2
- Radio New Zealand Cricket Annual 16th Edition (1987), 1986/87 season ISBN 978-0-908570-20-1
- Radio New Zealand Cricket Annual 17th Edition (1988), 1987/88 season
- Radio New Zealand Cricket Annual 18th Edition (1989), 1988/89 season ISBN 1-86947-050-8
- Radio New Zealand Cricket Annual 19th Edition (1990), 1989/90 season ISBN 1-86947-063-X
- Radio New Zealand Cricket Annual 20th Edition (1991), 1990/91 season
