= Basin Reserve =

New Zealand Cricket ground

Cello Basin Reserve
- The Basin
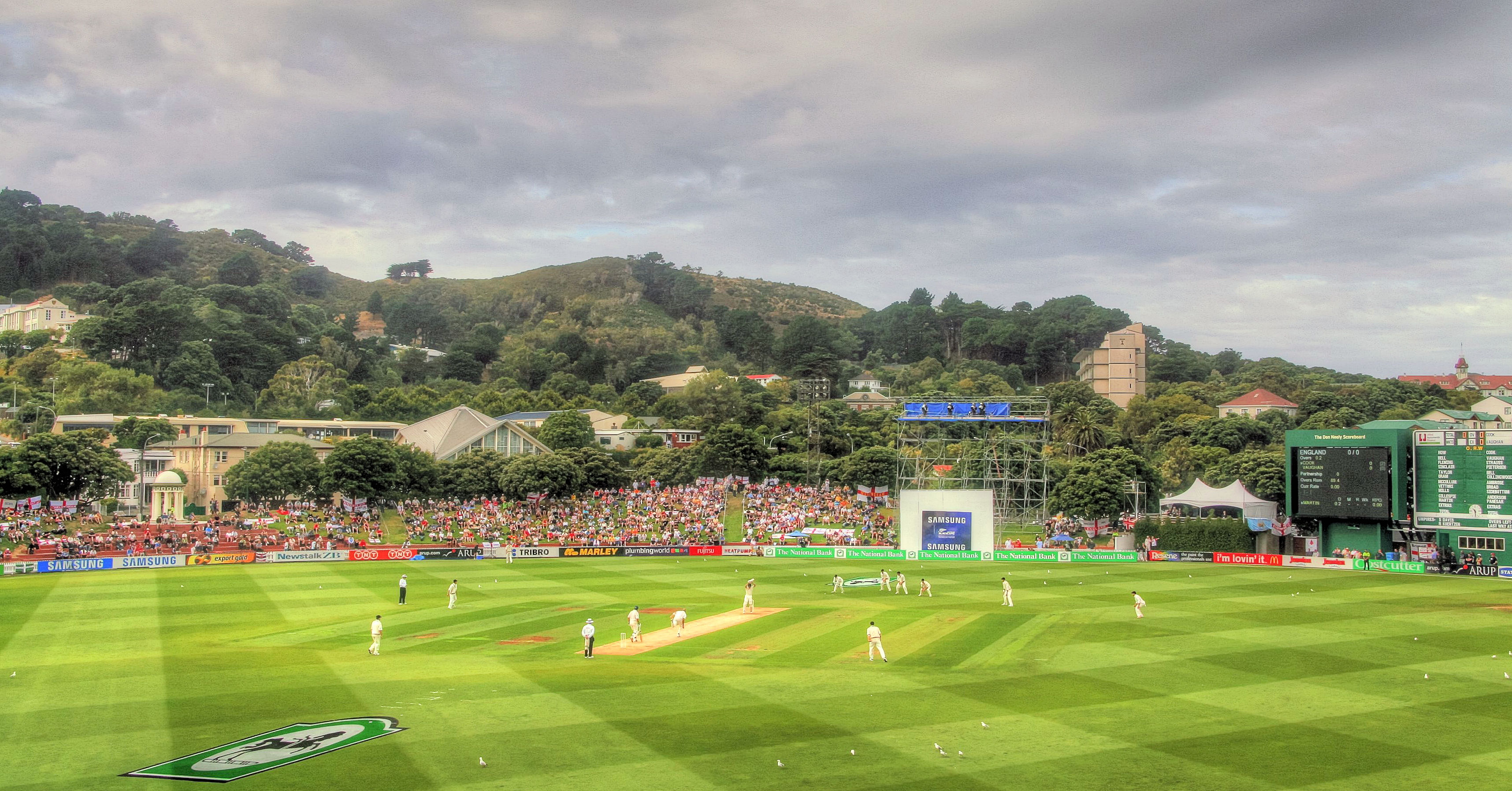
- A view of Basin Reserve in 2008
- Interactive map of Cello Basin Reserve

Ground information
- Location: Mount Cook, Wellington, New Zealand
- Country: New Zealand
- Coordinates: 41°18′1″S 174°46′49″E
- Establishment: 1868
- Capacity: 6,800 (for cricket)
- Website: basinreserve.nz
- End names
- Vance Stand End; Scoreboard End

International information
- First men's Test: 24–27 January 1930: New Zealand v England
- Last men's Test: 10-14 December 2025: New Zealand v West Indies
- First men's ODI: 9 March 1975: New Zealand v England
- Last men's ODI: 5 January 2025: New Zealand v Sri Lanka
- First women's Test: 20–23 March 1948: New Zealand v Australia
- Last women's Test: 26–29 January 1990: New Zealand v Australia
- First women's ODI: 23 January 1982: Australia v England
- Last women's ODI: 4 April 2026: New Zealand v South Africa
- First women's T20I: 28 February 2016: New Zealand v Australia
- Last women's T20I: 29 March 2024: New Zealand v England

Team information
Wellington	(1873–present)
- As of 5 Janurary 2025; Source: CricketArchive

The Basin Reserve, commonly referred to as the Basin and also known as the Cello Basin Reserve for sponsorship reasons, is a cricket ground in Wellington, New Zealand. It is used for test matches, and is the main home ground of the Wellington Firebirds first-class team. The Basin Reserve is the only cricket ground to have listed status with Heritage New Zealand, in recognition of being the oldest first-class cricket ground in the country. Historically, the ground has also been used for events other than cricket, such as association football matches, concerts and cultural events.

The New Zealand Cricket Museum is located in the Museum Grandstand. It houses cricket memorabilia and a reference library. It opened in 1987 and was relaunched in 2021.

== Location ==
The Basin Reserve is two kilometres south of the Wellington CBD at the foot of Mount Victoria and is on a major roundabout in the city. Government House, St Mark's Church School, and Wellington College are across the street to the south of the Basin. At the eastern end of the Basin is the Mount Victoria Tunnel, which increased traffic around the Basin Reserve after it was built in 1931.

The Basin Reserve is also surrounded by numerous other Wellington landmarks, including Mount Cook Barracks, the National War Memorial and the former Dominion Museum. The Basin Reserve is the intersection point for the Wellington suburbs of Mount Cook, Newtown and Mount Victoria.

== Establishment and development ==
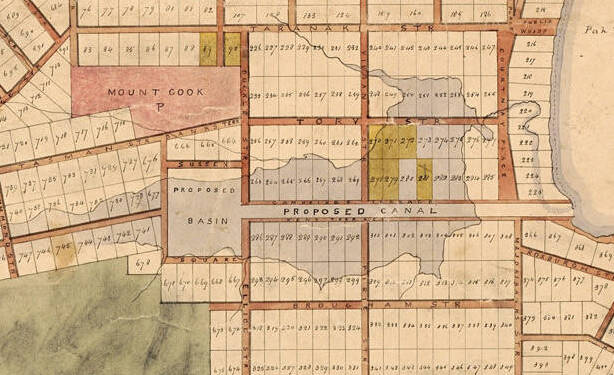
Proposed Basin and Canal, 1841

The area that is now the Basin Reserve was originally a swamp or lagoon, part of a large wet swampy area which extended almost to the harbour and west past Tory Street, fed by the Waitangi Stream from Newtown. The site was surveyed by William Mein Smith in 1840, with a view to deepening the Basin and connecting it to the sea by a canal to create an alternative mooring place, with warehouses and factories along the proposed canal which would run between Cambridge and Kent Terraces along the line of the stream: an 1841 map names the area as 'Proposed Basin and Canal'. The land was set aside as the Basin Reserve and the Canal Reserve. However, the 1855 Wairarapa earthquake uplifted the area nearly 1.8 m (5.9 ft) and partially drained the swamp.

Sport, particularly cricket, was a vital part of the community's relaxation, but no land had been allocated by the city planners for recreational reserves. Areas such as the Te Aro flat provided small spaces for matches, but colonists wanted more land for recreational use. The matter became dire as buildings began to be erected on the limited flat land available in hilly Wellington. After the 1855 earthquake, influential citizens seized the chance in 1857 to suggest that the new land raised at the Basin Reserve be drained and made into a recreational reserve and cricket ground. The Wellington Provincial Council accepted the proposal and on 3 February 1863 prisoners from Mount Cook Gaol began to level and drain the new land. The swamp was drained by September and a fence and hedges were placed around the entire area. However, massive population influxes from 1863 to 1866 (caused mostly by Parliament being moved to Wellington) hampered construction on the Basin Reserve as workers were pulled to other areas.

After a council meeting on 11 December 1866 the Basin Reserve became Wellington's official cricket ground. The cricketers soon organised drainage and other improvements to the ground. No cattle or horses were allowed in the ground and only small hedges and shrubs were allowed to be planted so as not to hamper cricket games. Soon after, on 11 January 1868, the first game of cricket was played, although the ground had numerous stones and thistles on it, which the umpire later apologised for as some players got injured. Although it was the opening day, no ceremony or music was played, nor was the opening advertised with banners. As late as 1871, the Basin Reserve grounds were still extremely soft, with small pools of swamp water and various weeds and shrubs sprouting over the fields. In late 1872, horses were used to level the playing field and this greatly improved the conditions.

Many further improvements were made in the following years. In the early 1880s an open drain through the middle of the Basin Reserve was culverted, which greatly increased the usable space. In the late 1970s the ground was reoriented and made into an oval, embankments were built, a new scoreboard was installed and the RA Vance Stand was constructed.

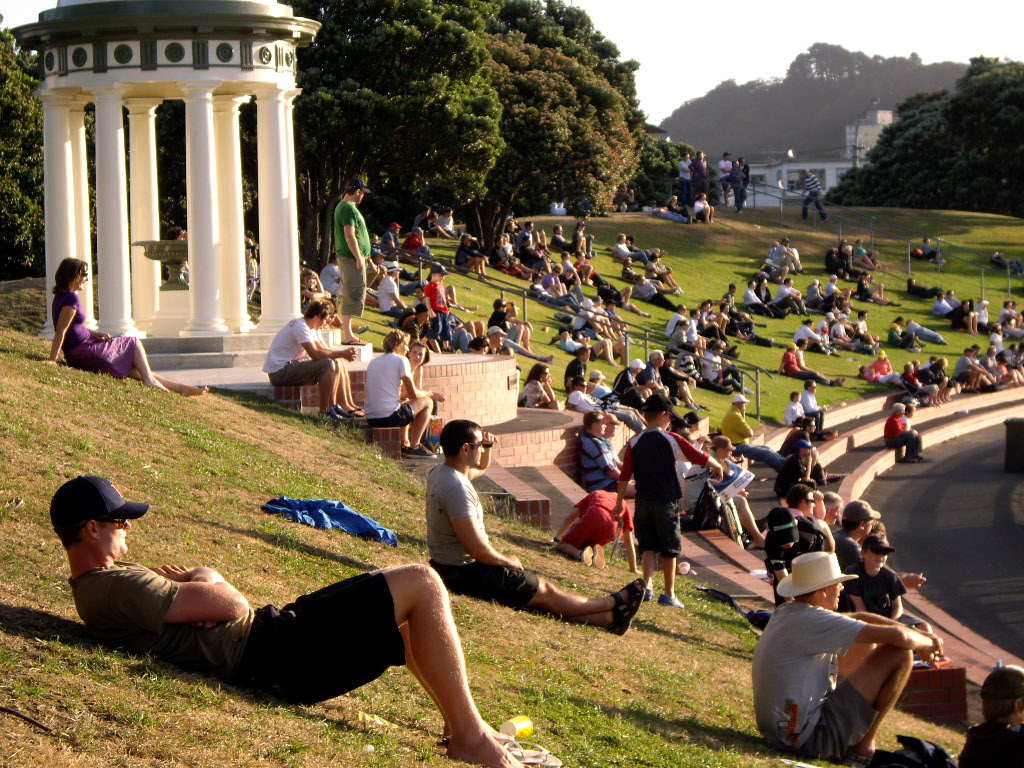
Spectators and the William Wakefield Memorial

=== Grandstands ===
Soon after cricket began at the Basin Reserve, Highland Games were organised by the Wellingtonian Caledonian Society, whose headquarters was the Caledonian Hotel just to the south of the Basin. The first grandstand at the Basin Reserve was built by the Caledonian Society in 1868, and sold to Wellington City Council in 1881. The Caledonian Stand deteriorated over time, and in 1925 it was demolished and replaced by a pavilion that is now known as the Museum Stand.

The Museum Stand was officially opened on 17 October 1925. It could seat 1300 people, and featured dressing rooms with hot and cold water, a tearoom with a kitchen, and ladies' toilets. In 1986 Wellington City Council approved the establishment of a cricket museum in the Museum Stand. In the wake of the Canterbury earthquakes in 2010 and 2011, in 2012 the Museum Stand was closed after being declared earthquake-prone. The stand was strengthened and refurbished in 2019, with the work winning an architectural award in 2022. It reopened with a capacity of 994 seats for the Black Caps test against India in February 2020. The pavilion has been a Category II registered Historic Place since 1982.

In 1980 the RA Vance Stand, named for cricketer Bob Vance, was completed to the north of the Museum Stand as part of a major redevelopment of the Basin Reserve. It was officially opened on 29 November 1980 and could seat 2000 spectators. The stand was refurbished in 2017, and a new players' pavilion in the stand opened in December 2018. This was renamed in 2020 in honour of the former test cricketer Ewen Chatfield.

=== Other points of interest ===
==== New Zealand Cricket Museum ====
The New Zealand Cricket Museum, founded in 1987, is housed in the Museum Stand. It has a collection of 30,000 cricket-related items and memorabilia including photographs and jerseys. The museum is open on cricket match days or by appointment and is usually free. The Museum Stand closed to spectators in 2012, but the museum remained open until 2019 when it closed in preparation for earthquake strengthening of the stand. It was redeveloped and reopened in 2021.

==== Gates ====
The main entrance gates at the Basin Reserve were built in 1917 (along with a new fence) and were later named after two prominent cricketers. The J.R. Reid Gate at the southern side of the grounds is named after John Reid, an accomplished bowler, fieldsman, captain, coach, selector and referee who played 44 first class matches at the Basin and was 191 not out for Wellington in 1959. The C.S. Dempster Gate at the northern side of the Basin is named after Charles ‘Stewie’ Dempster, who made his first-class début for Wellington in 1921-22.

==== William Wakefield Memorial ====
In 1882, the William Wakefield Memorial was erected at the Basin Reserve. The monument to commemorate a controversial early Wellingtonian, William Wakefield, had been in storage for many years until it was finally erected at the Basin. It was later moved outside the fence, then refurbished and relocated inside the grounds once more. The William Wakefield Memorial has a Heritage New Zealand Category I registration.

==== Former Midland St Pats cricket clubrooms ====
The single-storey former Midland St Pats clubrooms lie to the south of the Museum Stand. The clubrooms have become the headquarters of Cricket Wellington.

== Cricket history ==
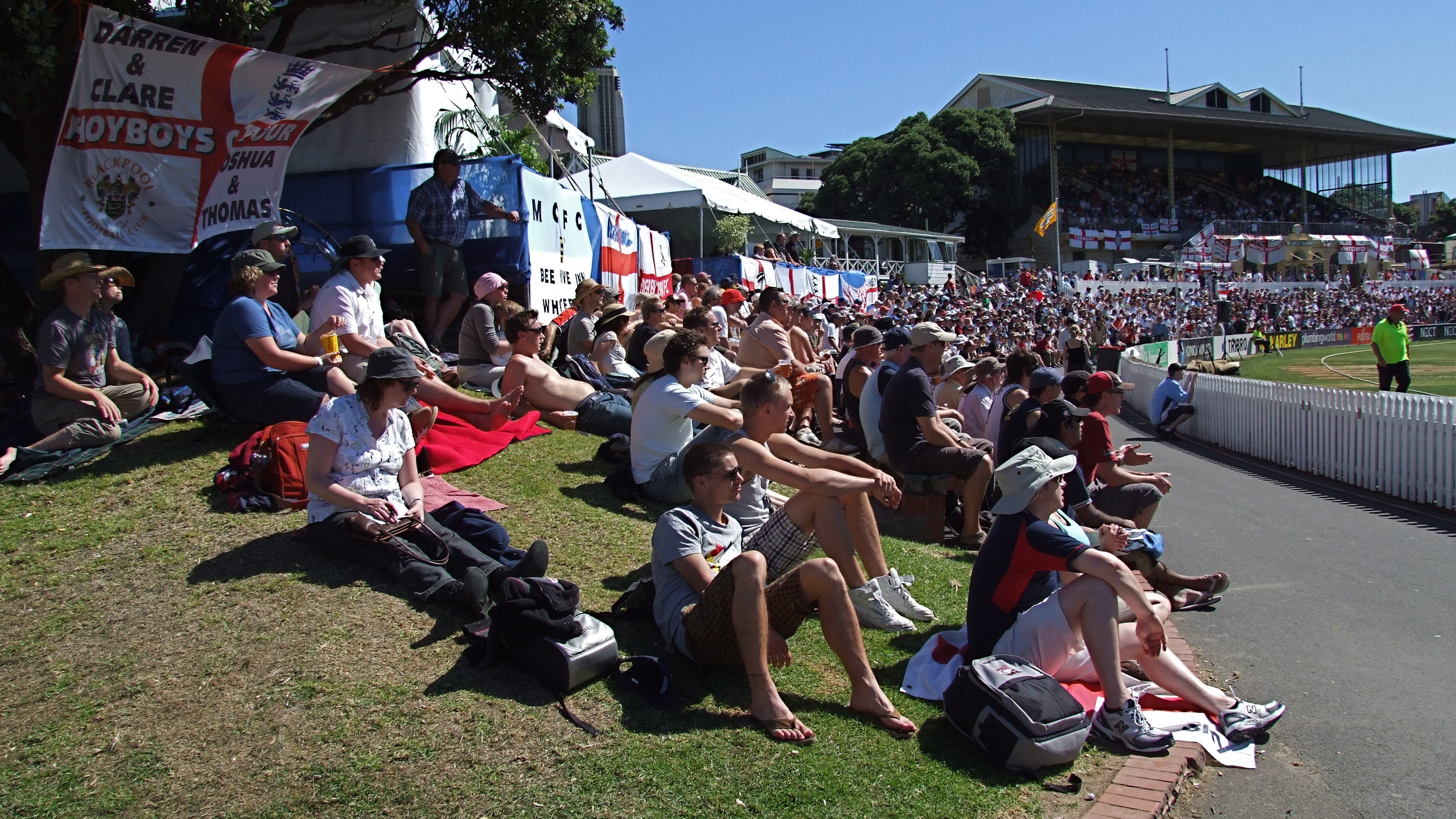
Crowd attending a Test match Between England and New Zealand at the Basin Reserve in 2008

The first event held at the Basin Reserve was a one-day cricket match on 11 January 1868 between the Wellington Volunteers and the crew of HMS Falcon, which was docked in Wellington. However, the match was hampered by injuries due to the numerous stones and thistles in the grass, which led to the injury of some players. The umpire apologised to the players after the match for the poor condition of the playing surface. This was finally remedied in late 1872, which allowed the ground's inaugural first-class cricket match, between Wellington and Auckland, to be played on 30 November 1873. Wellington won the match easily.

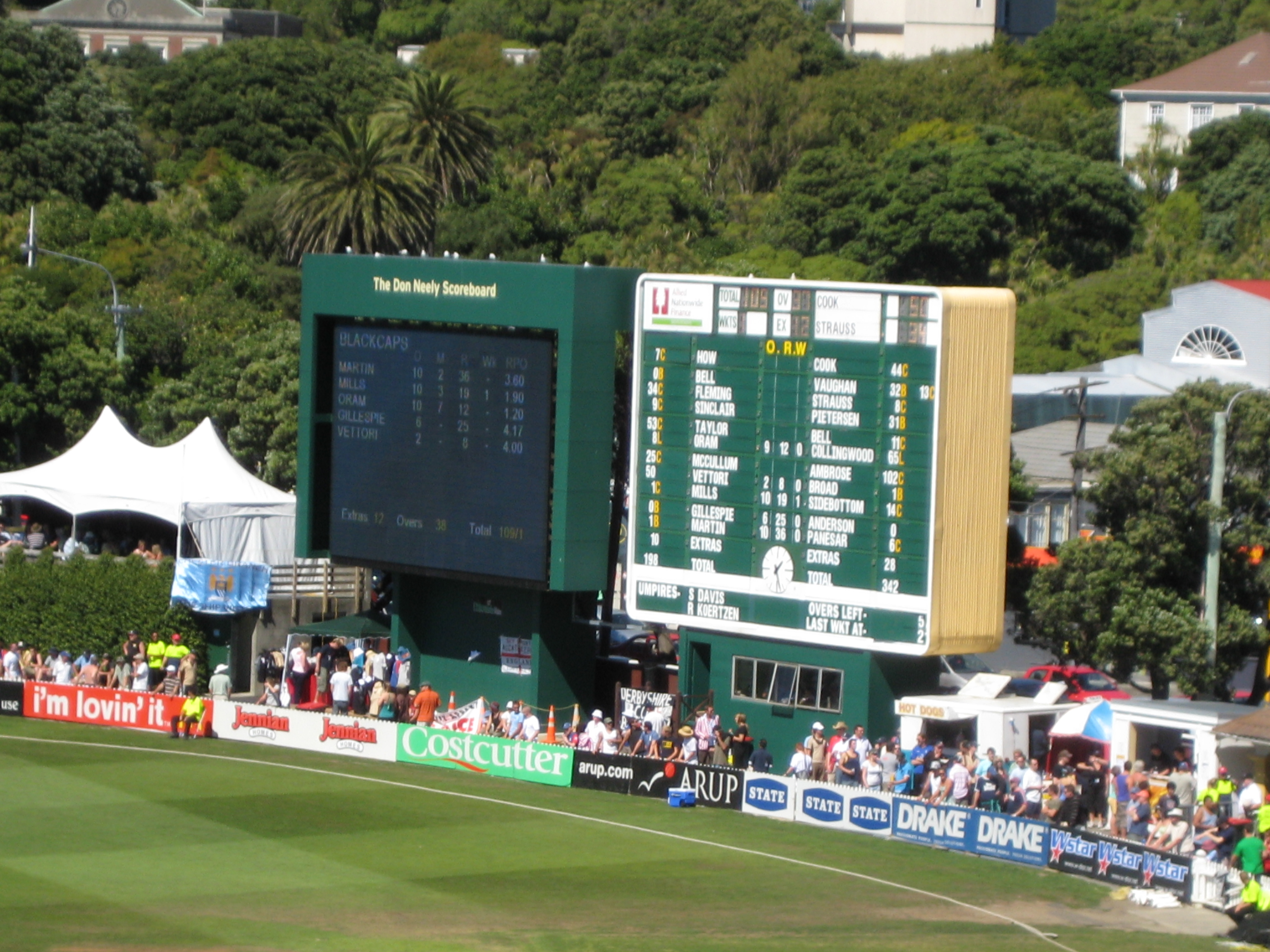
The main scoreboard: it is named after cricket historian Don Neely

The first test match played at the ground was between New Zealand and England, the first day of which was 24 January 1930. One-day international cricket was played at the Basin Reserve until 1999, after which it has mostly been played at the larger Wellington Regional Stadium on the other side of the Wellington CBD.

On 13 March 2011 the Basin Reserve was host to "Fill the Basin", a cricket event intended to raise money for victims of the 2011 Canterbury earthquake. The event attracted a crowd of more than 10,000 people, with some spectators sitting between the boundary rope and the fence. Players involved in the match included Shane Warne, Stephen Fleming, Tana Umaga, Richard Hadlee, Martin Crowe, other famous former New Zealand cricketers, rugby union players Richie McCaw and Conrad Smith and actors Russell Crowe and Ian McKellen. More than $500,000 was raised towards the relief efforts.

During England's 2002 tour the scoreboard was famously described by commentator Mike Selvey as the "ransom-note scoreboard" because of the eccentric collection of fonts that it used.

== Cricket statistics ==
=== Test matches ===
There have been 70 Test matches played at the Basin Reserve as of November 2026. The average runs per wicket is 32.38 while the average runs per wicket through New Zealand is 31.91. The average runs per over is 2.93. The ground is more noted as suiting fast bowlers as opposed to spin bowlers. 84% of Wickets ae taken by Pace Bowling and 13% by Spin Bowling, the top wicket taker at the ground is Tim Southee with 63, although he only has the 10th best bowling average on the ground.

There have been 109 both Men's and Women's Test Centuries scored at the ground since the first test at the ground in January 1930

Brendon McCullum has the highest innings score of 302, and is the first Black Cap to pass 300 runs in a test match. The previous highest score at the ground and for any NZ test cricketer was the 299 runs scored by Martin Crowe in 1991 Almost a year later in 2015, Kumar Sangakkara scored his 12000th test runs and his 11th double century there while McCullum dropped three catches and scored a two-ball duck in the first innings. It is also a ground where Trent Boult made the most of his one-handed catches. One of which was the one that removed Sangakkara in 2015. In the same test, Kane Williamson scored his first test double century, with his 6th wicket partner BJ Watling scoring a century in the second innings. Williamson also contributed on the field to help NZ win the test match. His catch also made the top play on Sportscenter in the US. In 2017, this was also the ground where Henry Nicholls scored his maiden Test century. Late in that year, Tom Blundell scored his maiden Test century on debut, then walked home while still in uniform as he lives near the ground.

The highest total set by a team here in Test cricket was by the New Zealand national cricket team when they scored 680/8 dec on 14 Feb 2014 against the Indian national cricket team. The most runs scored at this ground have been by Kane Williamson (1591 runs), Ross Taylor (1279 runs), and Martin Crowe (1123 runs). The most wickets have been taken by Chris Martin (60 wickets), followed by Daniel Vettori (57 wickets) and Richard Hadlee (53 wickets).

=== ODI matches ===
In ODI cricket, the highest total has been set by New Zealand against Pakistan when they scored 315/7 on 6 January 2018. The most runs scored at this ground have been by Martin Crowe (345 runs), Andrew Jones (311 runs) and Nathan Astle (285 runs). The most wickets have been taken by Danny Morrison (16 wickets), Chris Harris (13 wickets) and Gavin Larsen (12 wickets). Despite the propensity to score Test centuries, ODI centuries Only 6 have ever been scored at the Ground. The most recent was 100* by Daryl Mitchell (New Zealand cricketer) on 26 March 2021 against Bangladesh. The only away batsman to score an ODI century here was Shoaib Mohammad of Pakistan in 1989.

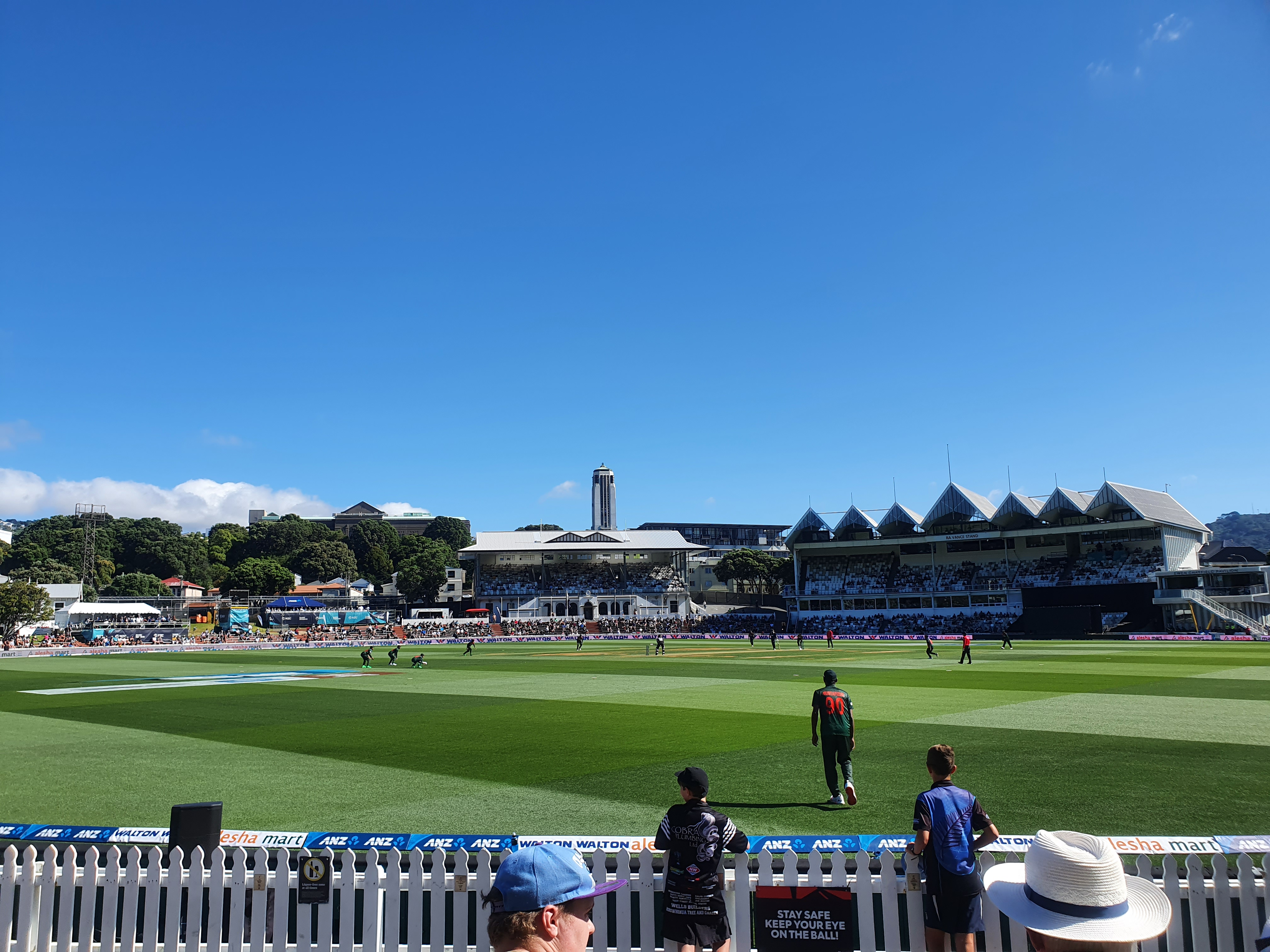
A One-Day International between Bangladesh and New Zealand in 2021

== International rugby league matches ==
Between 1919 and 1953, Basin Reserve played host to 5 rugby league Test matches, all involving the New Zealand national rugby league team who would end up with a 3–2 W/L record at the ground.

Test#	Date	Result	Attendance	Notes
1	23 August 1919	Australia def. New Zealand 44–21	8,000	1919 Kangaroo tour of New Zealand – 1st Test
2	14 August 1920	Great Britain* def. New Zealand 11–10	4,000	1920 Great Britain Lions tour – 3rd Test
3	6 August 1924	New Zealand def. Great Britain* 13–11	6,000	1919 Kangaroo tour of New Zealand – 2nd Test
4	17 September 1949	New Zealand def. Australia 26–21	7,737	1949 Kangaroo tour of New Zealand – 1st Test
4	4 July 1953	New Zealand def. Australia 12–11	5,394	1953 Kangaroo tour of New Zealand – 2nd Test

* Although it was the Great Britain team, they were called Northern Union in 1920 and played as England in 1924 despite having Welsh players in the side.

== Other uses ==
After the first cricket match in 1868, local clubs and societies began organising athletic and social meetings at the Basin Reserve. These meetings eventually coalesced into a meeting known locally as the Highland Games, and it was their success which led to the construction of the ground's first grandstand. The events included athletics, racing, dancing and later wood-chopping and cycling. The games were organised by the Wellingtonian Caledonian Society, whose headquarters, The Caledonian Hotel, still stands towards the south of the Basin Reserve.

In May 1879, the Basin Reserve was the site of the first public display of electricity in Wellington. Thousands of people turned up to see a game of soccer played under floodlights. There were problems with the lights but the demonstration was deemed a qualified success.

The Basin Reserve reputedly held the first rugby football match in the North Island, between a Wellington team and the crew of HMS Rosario, which the sailors won by a single goal.

The Australasian Athletic Championships were held at the Basin Reserve on 26–27 December 1911. This was a combined Australian and New Zealand championship, at which New Zealanders won all the track events and Australians won all the field events.

Before embarking on the 1921–22 Kangaroo tour of Great Britain, the Australian rugby league team stopped in Wellington for an exhibition match at the Basin Reserve.

During the 1950s and 1960s the ground was the main association football (soccer) venue in the Wellington area, and was used for a number of international matches and Chatham Cup finals.

On 17 March 2019 the Basin Reserve hosted an estimated 11,000 people at a vigil mourning the victims of the Christchurch mosque shootings.

== Traffic issues ==
The Basin Reserve is the largest roundabout in the Southern Hemisphere and was featured in the 2014 'Roundabouts of the World' calendar. Its position at the intersection of Kent and Cambridge Terraces to the north, the approach to the Mount Victoria Tunnel to the west, Adelaide Road to the south and the Arras Tunnel to the east makes it a very busy traffic route. Traffic formerly went around the Basin Reserve in both directions, but in the early 1970s a one-way system was introduced.

In 1963, U.S. consultants De Leuw Cather proposed that the Wellington Urban Motorway then under construction be extended across Wellington past the Basin Reserve to the Mount Victoria Tunnel. The motorway as far as the Terrace Tunnel was opened in 1978, but its extension to Mount Victoria was cancelled as this would have meant destruction of the Basin Reserve. The plan was cancelled in 1993 due to funding constraints and public opposition.

In 2009, the NZ Transport Agency (NZTA) announced a $2.6 billion package of roading projects for the Wellington region, known as the Wellington Northern Corridor. As part of this project, NZTA put forward plans to build a 265-metre elevated highway 20 metres north of the Basin Reserve, which would be known as the Basin Bridge. It would take traffic to and from the Mount Victoria Tunnel, separating local and State Highway 1 traffic and thus alleviating congestion around the Basin Reserve. The flyover was opposed by many, including a lobby group called Save the Basin which said the flyover was expensive, ugly and damaging to the Basin Reserve and the heritage area around the National War Memorial, and would ruin the view for nearby apartment dwellers. A board of inquiry declined resource consent for the flyover in 2014, citing concerns about possible impacts on cricket at the Basin Reserve and the heritage area nearby.

Meanwhile, in 2014 the one-way Arras Tunnel between the Basin Reserve and Taranaki Street was opened as part of the Wellington Inner City Bypass.

In 2019, NZTA formed 'Let's Get Wellington Moving', a partnership with Wellington City Council and Greater Wellington Regional Council, to create a comprehensive transport plan for Wellington. Let's Get Wellington Moving aimed to solve traffic congestion problems between Wellington Airport and Ngauranga Gorge and included changes at the Basin Reserve. The plan was cancelled in December 2023.

== See also ==
- List of Test cricket grounds

== Bibliography ==
- Neely, D., Romanos, J. (2003). The Basin: An Illustrated History of the Basin Reserve. Canterbury University Press. ISBN 1-877257-05-2.
