= The Arts Desk =

British arts journalism website

- Website type: Journalism
- Available in: English
- Founded: September 2009
- Headquarters: Barnet, England, United Kingdom
- Owner: The Arts Desk Limited
- Founders: Ismene Brown, Jasper Rees, Kevin Madden
- Website: www.theartsdesk.com
- Commercial: Yes
- Registration: Yes

The Arts Desk (theartsdesk.com) is a British arts journalism website containing reviews, interviews, news, and other content related to music, theatre, television, films, and other art forms written by journalists from a variety of traditional and web-based publications. It bills itself as "Britain’s first professional arts critics website".

== History ==
It was designed and dummied with collective input by dance critic Ismene Brown during 2009 and initially built on the Joomla! open-source platform by Alex and Jack Bremer of 3B Digital. It launched on 9 September 2009 with Ismene Brown (dance), Peter Culshaw (new music), Fisun Güner (visual art), Veronica Lee (comedy), Jasper Rees (film), Adam Sweeting (TV), Igor Toronyi-Lalic (classical music) and Matt Wolf (theatre) serving as founding section editors, and a team of some two dozen writers, critics and photographers. The content includes overnight reviews, arts news, extended interviews, festival guides, and video and visual features. The website has staged public debates and panel discussions. In its first year, it drew around 60,000 monthly visitors.

Since late 2009 its commercial director and publisher has been Kevin Madden. From January 2010 to 2013 its honorary chairman was Sir John Tusa. Its contributors are professional critics and veteran journalists most of whom have worked for publications such as The Times, The Guardian, and The Telegraph, and guest creatives and performers are also sometimes invited to post first-person articles on the site. In 2019, The Arts Desk signed a deal with JPI Media that would allow I news to feature arts reviews and other articles written by the website's editors.

== Reception ==
Upon its launch, The Telegraph deemed it as one of the best culture websites on the internet. BBC Radio 5 Live described it as an "essential site of 2009". The website's technical exploitation of the Joomla! K2 extension in its first phase was hailed by JoomlaWorks founder and lead developer Fotis Evangelou as world-leading. In 2012, it won The Drum Online Media Award as the year's best specialist journalism site, jointly with the website for The Economist.
