= I Found My Horn =

Book by Jasper Rees

I Found My Horn: One Man's Struggle with the Orchestra's Most Difficult Instrument
- Author: Jasper Rees
- Publication date: 2008
- Media type: Hardcover

I Found My Horn: One Man's Struggle with the Orchestra's Most Difficult Instrument is a book by British columnist Jasper Rees, first published in hardback in 2008, and adapted for the stage later in that year.

== The book ==
It is a semi-autobiographal story that follows Rees as he turns forty and decides to reunite himself with his French horn, an instrument he gave up upon leaving school, along with his mentor Dave Lee.

Rees was already writing a regular arts column for the Daily Telegraph and the early beginnings of his book can be seen in a 2005 article. Soon after publication it was adapted for radio and broadcast as Radio 4's Book of the Week. It was also released in the United States, under the amended title of A Devil to Play.

== The play ==
After his wife heard and recommended the Radio 4 broadcast, actor and playwright Jonathan Guy Lewis approached Rees about a stage version. The two writers teamed up with director Harry Burton, and the one-man show premiered at the Aldeburgh Festival. It then opened at the Tristan Bates Theatre, where it was reviewed as 'very funny' and 'a celebration of the joyous, life-affirming power of music' by The Times.

In 2009 the show transferred to the Hampstead Theatre, where a four-star review from the Guardian called it "delightful", "wryly funny" and "infinitely touching", before it appeared in the 2009 Autumn season of the Chichester Festival Theatre.

The show was lit by Jeremy Coney, the former New Zealand cricketer.

The horn Rees plays is by Josef Lidl.
