= Streichmelodion =

Bowed viol-shaped zither

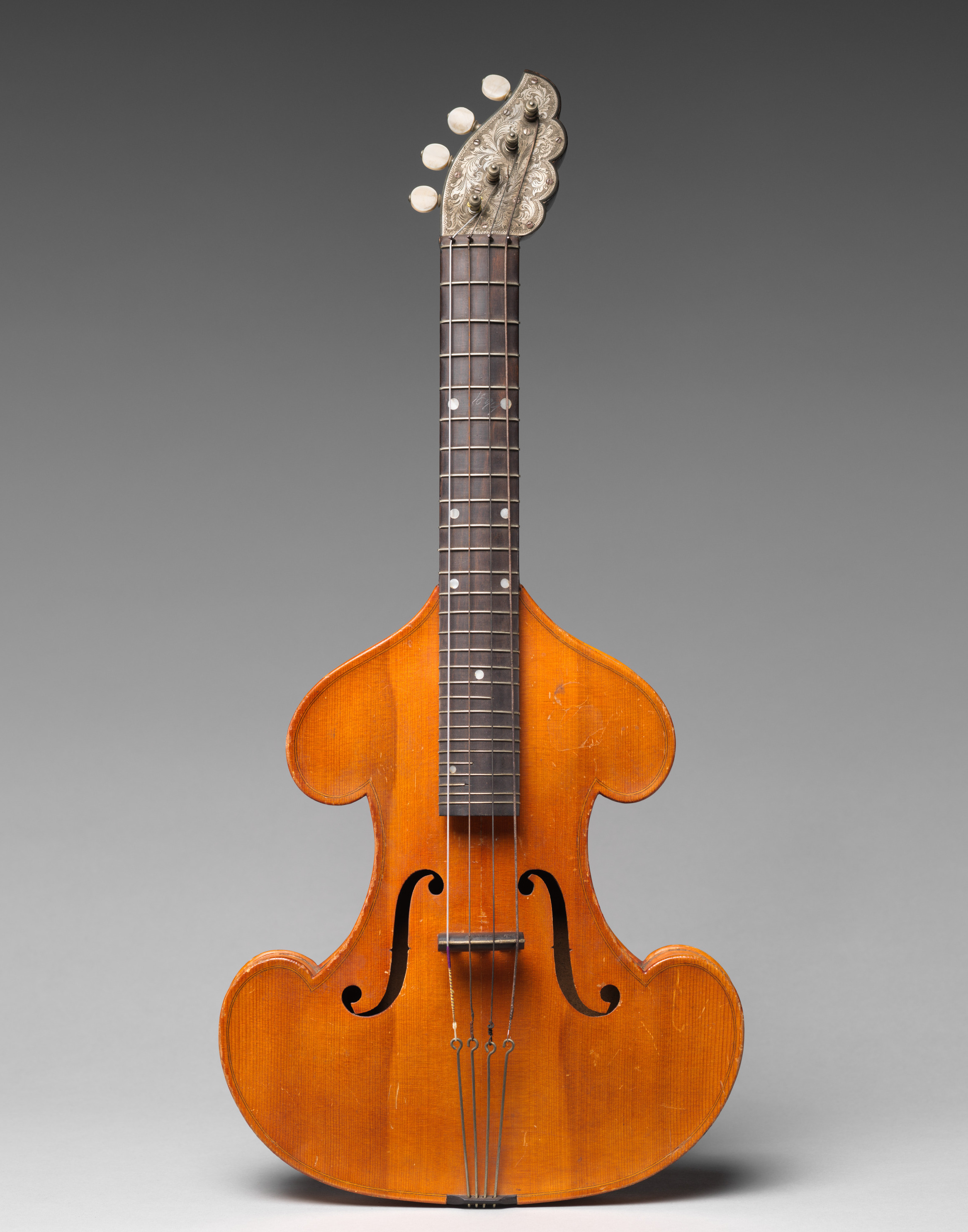
- A Streichmelodion in the Metropolitan Museum of Art
- Other names: Breitoline, lap harp
- Classification: Chordophone
- Hornbostel–Sachs classification: 314.122
- Inventor: Leopold Breit
- Developed: 1856

Related instruments
- Streichzither, alpine zither

The Streichmelodion (STREISH-meh-loh-dee-ən, lit. "stroke melodion") or Breitoline (BRAI-toh-leen-nə: a portmanteau of Breit, the surname of the inventor, and violin in German) is a bowed zither, similar in size and form to a viola. Structurally, the instrument is best described as a kind of fretted violin. The Streichmelodion was created in 1856 by Leopold Breit in Brno, evolving from the alpine zither and inspired by the Streichzither. The Breitoline is described as having a richer, more robust tone than the Streichzither, and has a compass slightly lower than that of a viola. Breitolines are played with the body of the instrument resting on the player's lap (hence the name "lap harp"), with the part of the zither between the neck and headstock resting on a table. Many Streichmelodions were produced in Markneukirchen at the Ernst Rudolph Glier factory during the 19th century.

The instrument has a bridge, with its ribs having a steep curve, similar to those of the viola da gamba. The instrument has a curved fingerboard with around 29 frets, with fretboard markers inlaid at the fifth, ninth, 12th, and 25th frets. Like most classical string instruments, it has two F Holes. The pegboxes were asymmetrical, leaning to the left. Most models of the instrument have four strings, although Breit's original version had five. Streichzithers came in various different sizes, including viola, cello and bass, although tunings for each are disputed. The strings are usually tuned according to traditional alpine zither tuning, reverse to that of a violin. This is most commonly e" a’ d’ g.

The instrument achieved popularity not only in Moravia — its birthplace — but also in Germany and Austria, where the instrument can be seen in the 1910 catalogue of Josef Lidl, in two different sizes. The instrument, however, did receive some negative reception from German zitherist virtuoso Hans Gruber, who stated that the instrument was "in shape and tone more like a frying pan than a musical instrument."

== Gallery ==
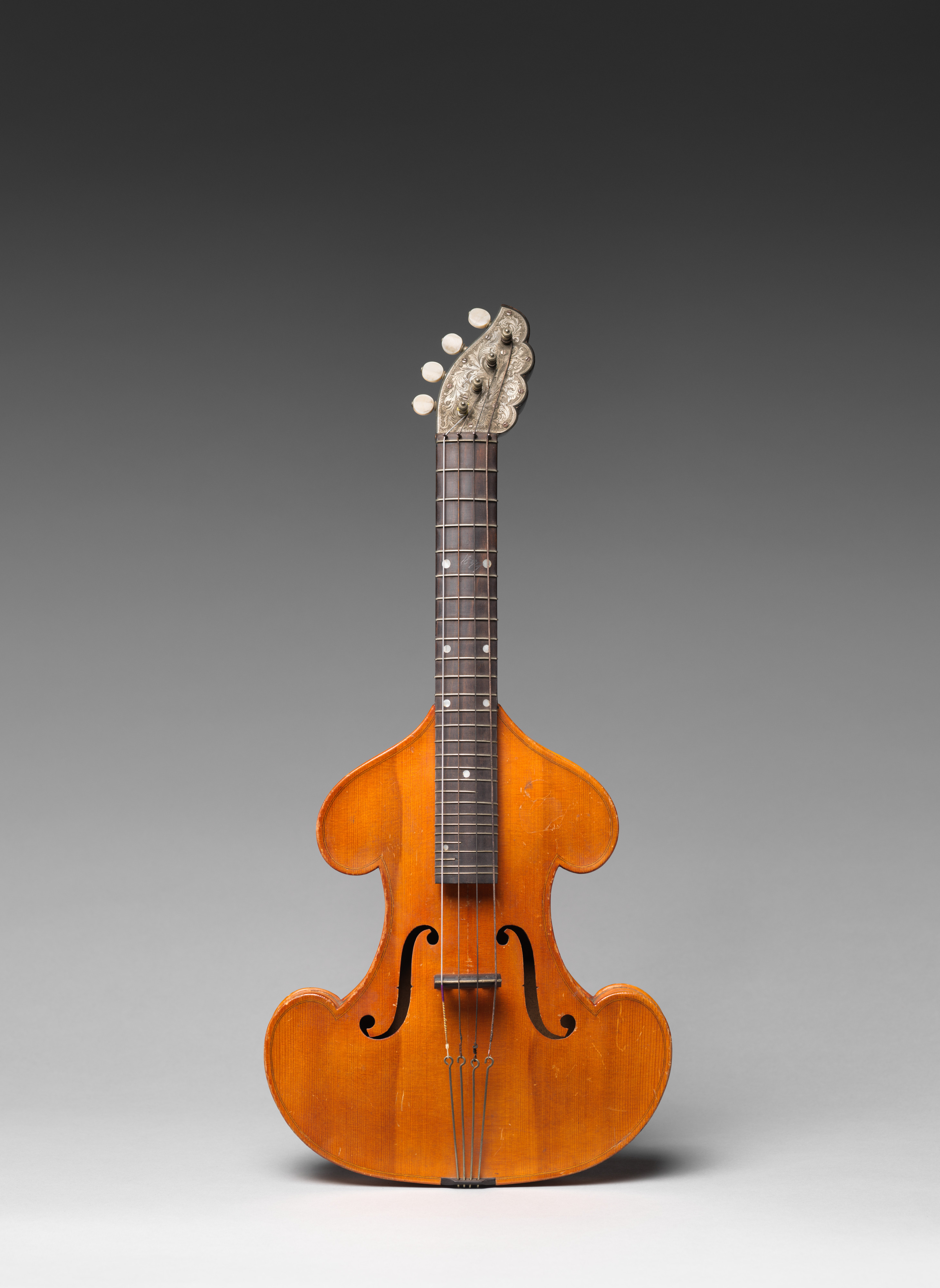
Front side of a streichmelodion in the Met Museum

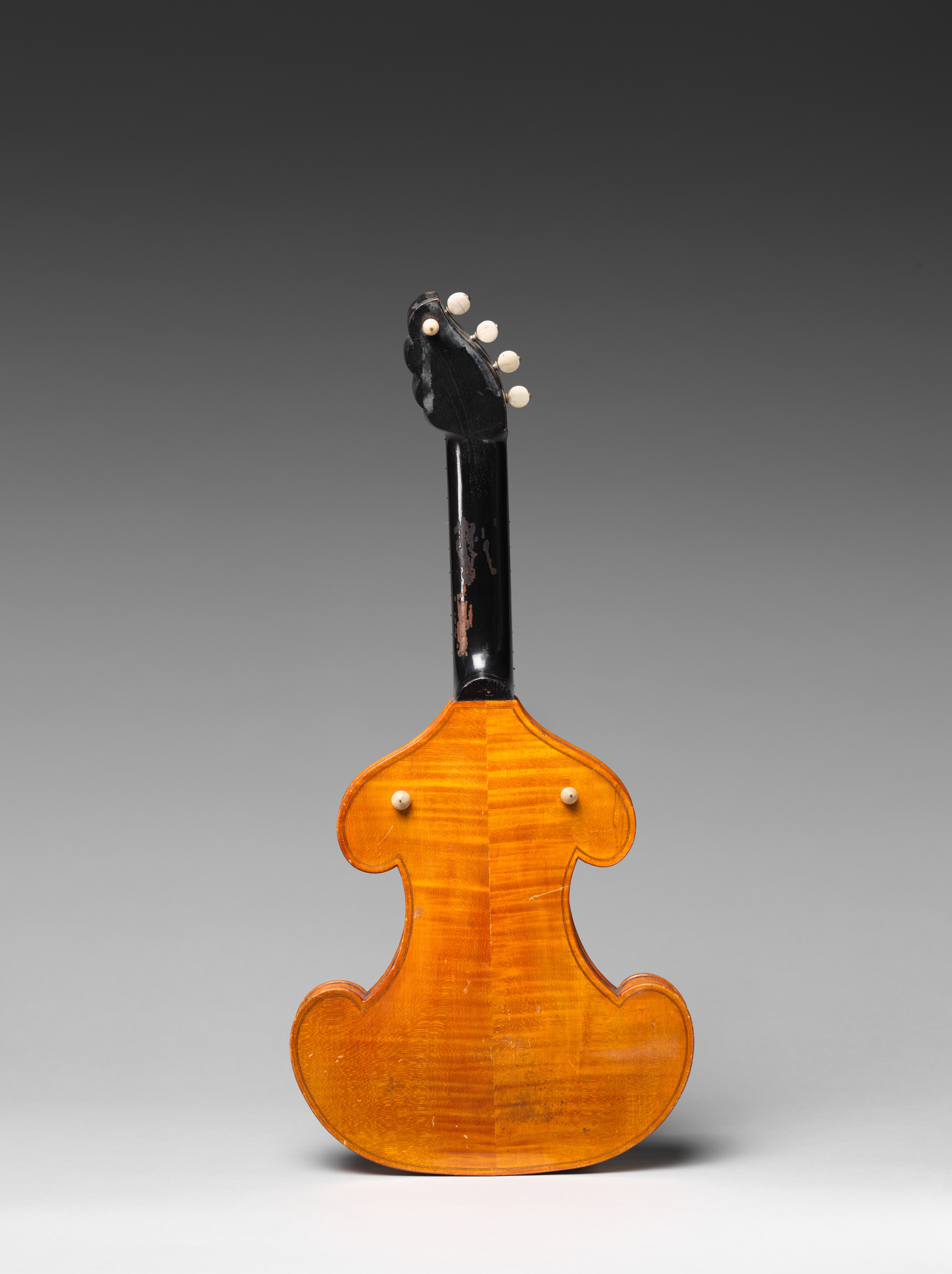
Back side of the same streichmelodion.

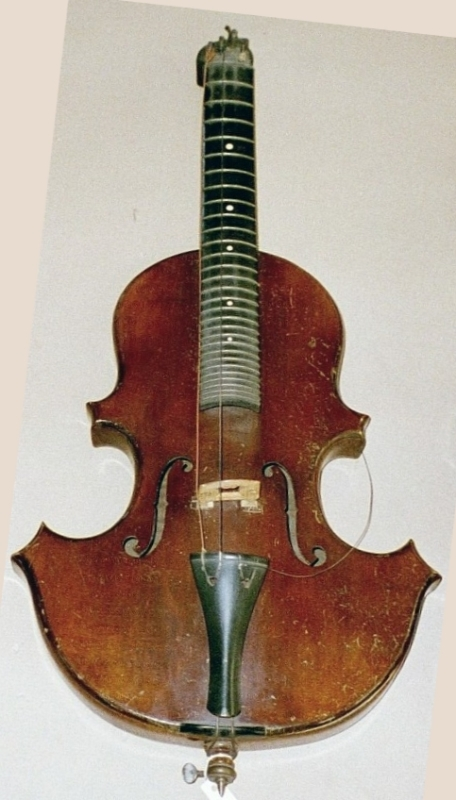
Streichmelodion in the Museum of Musical Instruments, Leipzig University.

== See also ==
- Bowed psaltery
