= Mount Cook, Wellington =

Suburb of Wellington City, New Zealand

Mount Cook
- Suburb
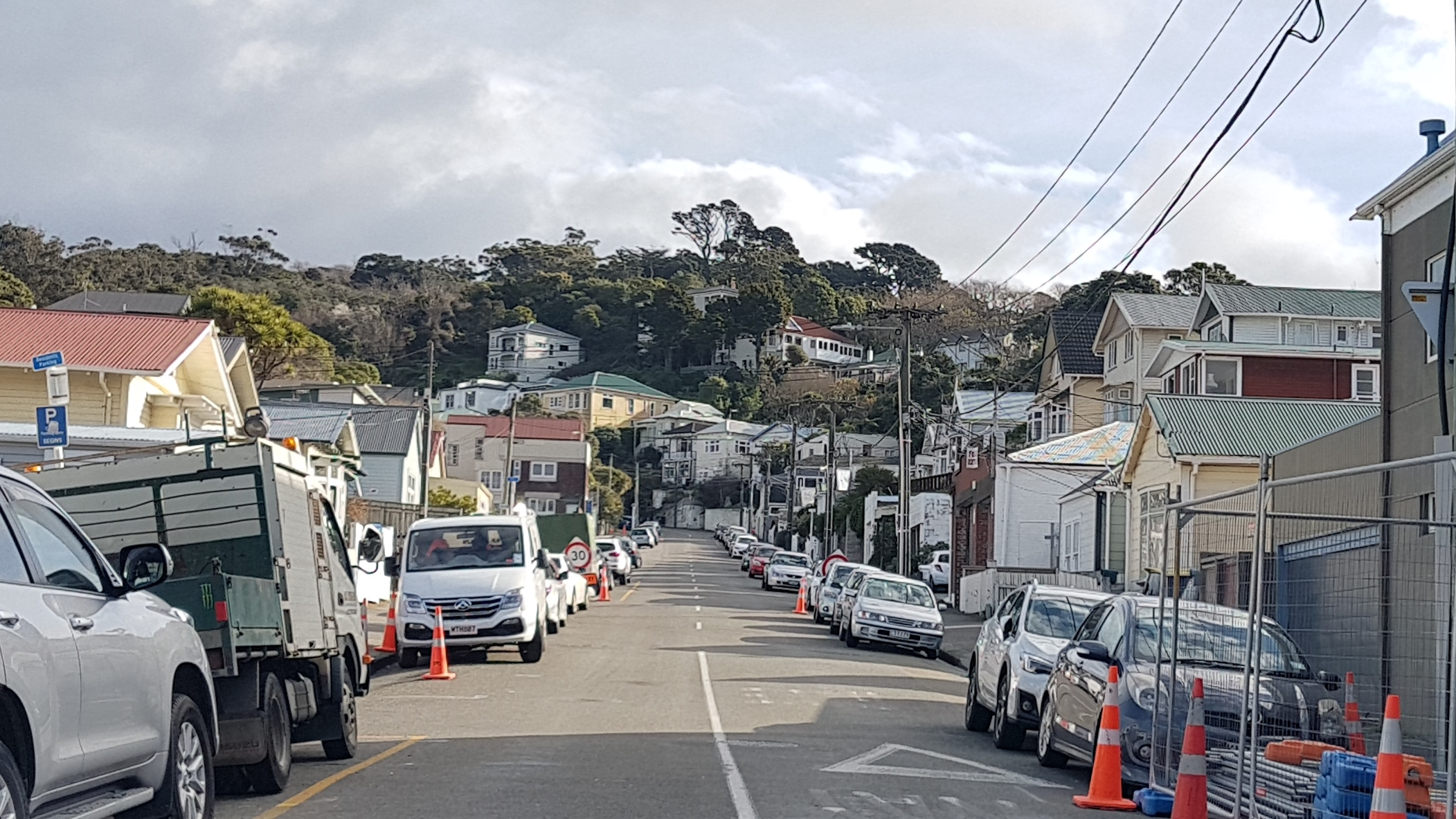
- Interactive map of Mount Cook
- Coordinates: 41°18′06″S 174°46′27″E
- Country: New Zealand
- City: Wellington City
- Local authority: Wellington City Council
- Electoral ward: Pukehīnau/Lambton Ward; Te Whanganui-a-Tara Māori Ward

Area
  - Land: 105 ha (260 acres)

Population (June 2025)
  - Total: 7,180
  - Density: 6,840/km^{2} (17,700/sq mi)

Aro Valley	Te Aro	Mount Victoria
	Mount Cook	Hataitai
Brooklyn	Newtown

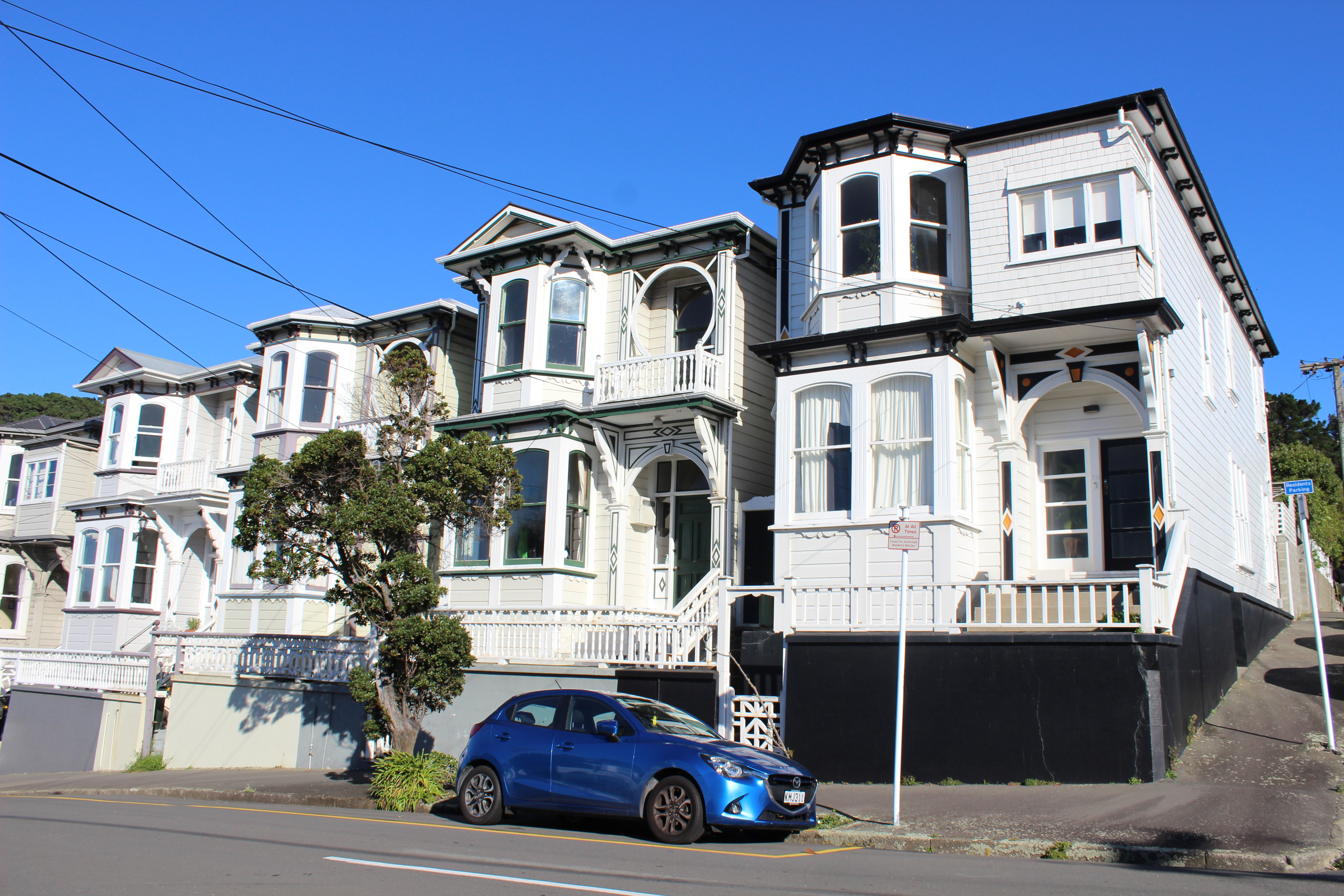
Wright Street Historic Houses

Mount Cook is an inner city suburb of Wellington, the capital of New Zealand. It is located 1.74 km south of Wellington's central business district. It is part of Wellington Central electorate and lies within the City of Wellington local government area. A hill in the location was named 'Cook's Mount' by the New Zealand Company, after explorer James Cook, but the name later changed to 'Mount Cook'.

== History ==
=== Māori settlement ===
The Māori name of Mount Cook hill is Pukeahu ('raised hill'). When European settlers arrived in 1840, they found remnants of an abandoned pā on top of the hill. Māori used the Hauwai swamp at the base of Pukeahu (the present-day Basin Reserve) as a source of eels, fish and flax, and gardened on the slopes around Pukeahu and near present-day Nairn Street. In September 1839, Te Āti Awa chiefs Te Puni and Wharepōuri signed a deed of purchase ceding land at Wellington to the New Zealand Company. A tenth of their lands including "Cook's Mount" were to be reserved as 'native reserves' "and held in trust by them for the future benefit of the said chiefs, their families, and their heirs for ever".

=== Military, prison and police use ===
Although Mount Cook was supposed to be set aside as a native reserve, a rudimentary prison was established there in 1840. Troops were stationed at Mount Cook from 1843, and a two-storeyed brick prison, solid but unhealthy, was built on the hilltop. Expansion of the military base required more Māori land, and the top of the hill was lowered by about 14 metres to create more flat land. Mount Cook became Wellington's main fortification in case of attack by Māori, although a report by the Royal Engineers in 1852 noted that since it was on the edge of the city it offered no protection to Wellington. The government bought more land from Māori in 1874, and additional military buildings were built in the 1870s and 1880s. A barracks became temporary quarters for newly-arrived assisted immigrants.

In 1883, construction began on a huge new prison which would have six wings and house the worst criminals. More of the hill was lowered and levelled for the first wing of the prison building, which was three storeys high and had walls up to three metres thick in places. Prisoners from the Terrace Gaol were marched through the city to the building site, where they made bricks and helped construct the prison. Only one wing was ever completed. In 1896, Inspector of Prisons Arthur Hume said that the prison was ready for occupation. A notable group of 70 prisoners arrived at the end of 1897. These were followers of Taranaki prophets Tohu Kākahi and Te Whiti o Rongomai who had been arrested for protesting about land issues. The massive prison on its prominent site looming over the city was regarded as an eyesore and widely disliked. In June 1898 the government announced that it would no longer be used as a prison. Around 1900 the site was taken over by the military for use as stores and barracks, and the building became known as Alexandra Barracks. It was demolished in 1931 to make way for the Dominion Museum and carillon.

More buildings for military use were constructed in the early 20th century, including the Defence Stores Office (later known as the General Headquarters Building) on the corner of Buckle and Taranaki streets which was completed in 1912 and declared a Historic Place Category 2 in 2003.

A police station opened at Mount Cook in 1894, as Te Aro was growing fast and crime was increasing. It was built of bricks made by prisoners at the nearby gaol.

=== Observatory and trig station ===
The Department of the Surveyor-General was set up in 1876 and began a national triangulation programme to survey New Zealand. In 1877, the Mount Cook Observatory trig station was established to be the centre of the Wellington surveying region. It was the 'initial station' of all cadastral and geodetic surveying in New Zealand until 1949. The observatory was shifted slightly in 1882 to make way for Mount Cook Gaol, and was dismantled in 1885. The Dominion Museum was built over the site of the trig station in the 1930s. A plaque and a compass on the floor of the museum foyer commemorate the exact location of the former trig station.

=== Brickworks ===
Several brickmaking companies operated in the suburb from the 1860s to the 1920s. The height of Mount Cook hill was lowered as it was excavated for clay for brickworks at the prison and private operations. Excavation of the south-western side of Mount Cook eventually led to formation of a flat area for Wellington High School's playing fields. Clay was also sourced from sections of the Town Belt near Brooklyn. Prisoners made bricks from the 1870s onwards: by the 1880s the prison brickyard was producing around two million bricks per annum. Prison bricks were marked with an arrow and were said to be of high quality. They were used in many prominent Wellington buildings including the Parliamentary Library, the Wellington Harbour Board Wharf Office Building and the now demolished Wellington Public Hospital.

Brickworks still existed in Rolleston Street in the 1920s, and from 1931 to the 1980s, Amalgamated Brick and Pipe Company marketed its ceramic wares from this premises.

== Points of interest ==
=== Basin Reserve ===
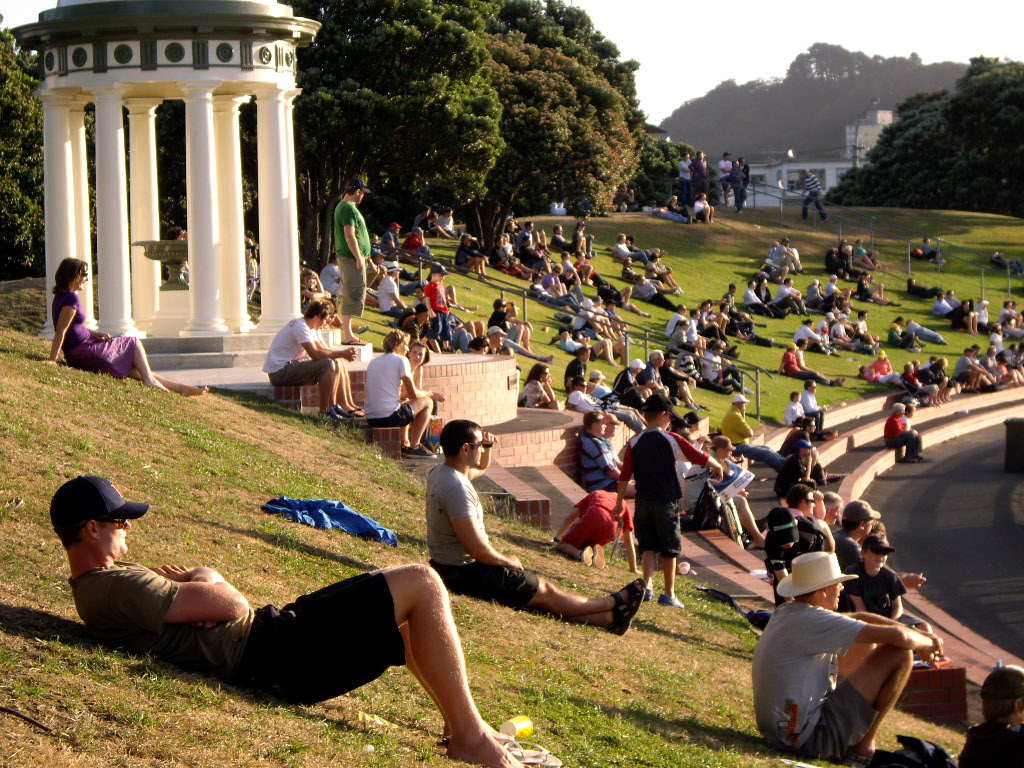
Spectators and the William Wakefield Memorial at the Basin Reserve.

The Basin Reserve, a cricket ground, is located at the north-east corner of Mount Cook. The area that is now the Basin Reserve was originally a swamp or lagoon but the 1855 Wairarapa earthquake uplifted the area nearly 1.8 m (5.9 ft) and partially drained the swamp. After the earthquake, influential citizens suggested that the new land raised at the Basin Reserve be drained and made into a recreational reserve and cricket ground, and in 1863 prisoners from Mount Cook Gaol began to level and drain the new land. In 1866 the Basin Reserve became Wellington's official cricket ground. The Basin Reserve is also used for other events. It contains several grandstands, the New Zealand Cricket Museum and the William Wakefield Memorial. The Basin Reserve is also the largest roundabout in the Southern Hemisphere and was featured in the 2014 'Roundabouts of the World' calendar.

=== National War Memorial ===
The National War Memorial of New Zealand is located next to the Dominion Museum building on Buckle Street. The war memorial was dedicated on Anzac Day (25 April) in 1932 in commemoration of World War I. It also officially remembers New Zealand soldiers who died in the Second Boer War, World War II and the wars in Korea, Malaysia and Vietnam. The war memorial consists of the War Memorial Carillon and the Hall of Memories. A tomb for an unknown New Zealand warrior was constructed in 2004, in front of the Hall of Memories. In the Hall of Memories, rolls of honour bear the names and ranks of 30,108 of New Zealand's war dead. Lyndon Smith's bronze statue of a family group in the Hall of Memories is the focal point for the complex.

=== Pukeahu National War Memorial Park ===
Pukeahu Park is situated below the National War Memorial. The park includes various national memorials to both New Zealand's military allies and historic opponents. The Buckle Street section of State Highway 1 was moved underground to a cut and cover tunnel, allowing the park to extend over the old road area to create a unified memorial precinct. The tunnel was named Arras Tunnel to honour the wartime efforts of the New Zealand Tunnelling Company in the French town of Arras during World War I. The tunnel contains 273 decorative red poppies, to remind drivers that they are passing through a significant commemorative space. The park was opened in April 2015 as part of New Zealand's commemoration of the 100th anniversary of World War I.

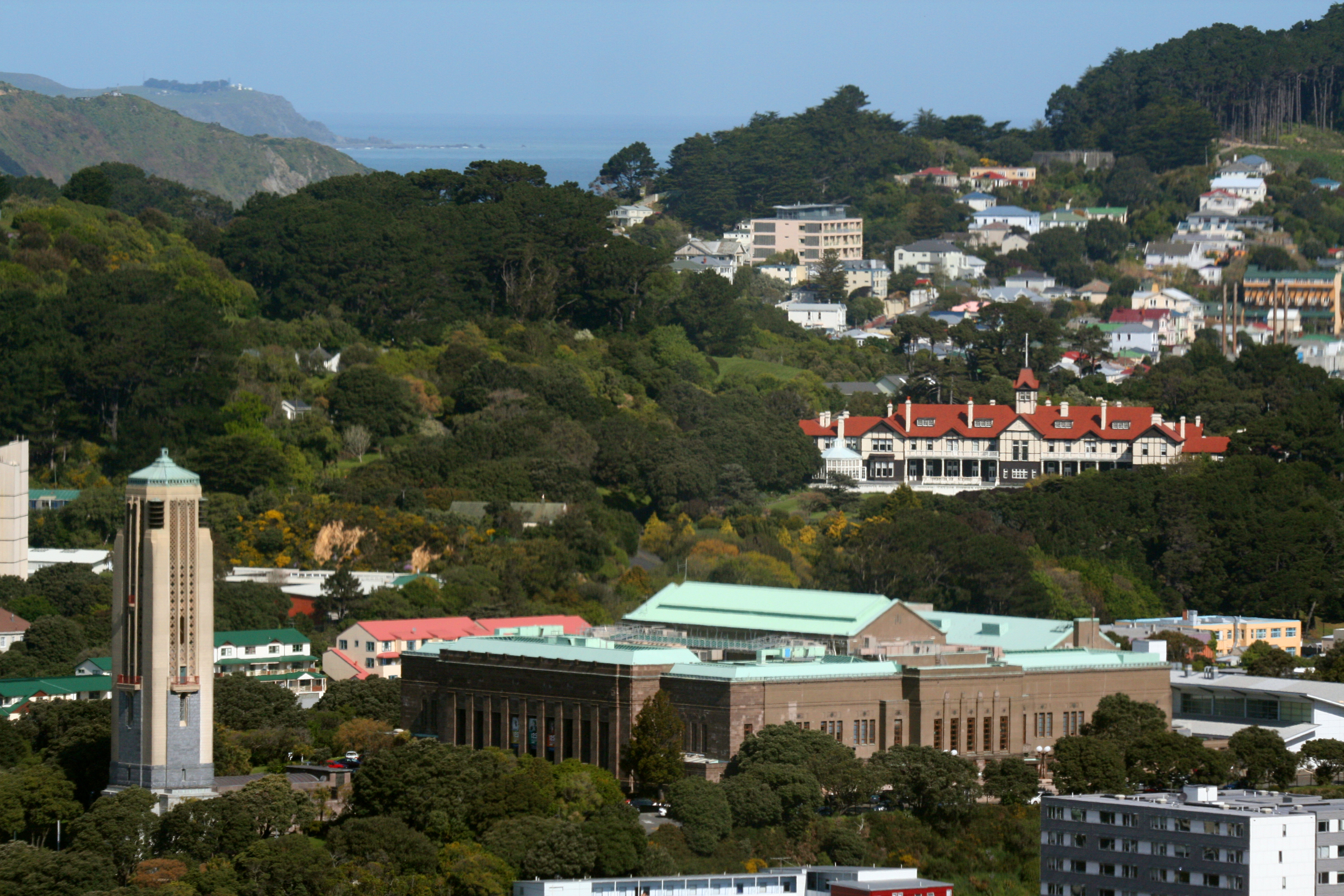
The museum on Mount Cook

=== Dominion Museum building ===
The Dominion Museum building in Buckle Street Wellington was completed in 1936 to replace an earlier museum building near Parliament. It formed part of a war memorial complex including a Carillon and National War Memorial. It was designed and built to house New Zealand's national museum collection, the National Art Gallery of New Zealand and the New Zealand Academy of Fine Arts. The building is constructed of reinforced concrete and partly faced with Putaruru stone. Columns in the foyer are faced with Whangarei marble. The roof is steel-framed and clad with copper and glass. The museum was officially opened by the Governor-General on 1 August 1936.

The building is registered by Heritage New Zealand as a Category 1 Historic Place. As of 2025, the building is owned by Massey University and the Wellington Tenths Trust, and is part of the University's Pukeahu Campus educational facilities. The building is also leased by Massey University as a venue for events such as conventions and live concerts.

=== Nairn Street Cottage ===
Nairn Street Cottage in Nairn Street is Wellington's oldest surviving cottage. It was built in 1858 by the Wallis family, who lived in the cottage for three generations. The cottage was built of wood in a late Georgian style and is similar to other houses built from that time through to about 1870. Tours of the cottage are available to hear about these early British colonists and their descendants, and the garden is open daily during daylight hours. Nairn Street Cottage is classified as a Category 1 Historic Place by Heritage New Zealand.

=== Tasman Street Wall ===
The Tasman Street Wall is a 250 metre-long brick retaining wall in Tasman Street built by prisoners in the 1890s. It is notable for its size, design and age, being the oldest extant structure in the former Mount Cook Reserve. Some of the bricks in the wall have incised arrows, showing they were made by prison labour. The wall has a Historic Place Category 2 listing from Heritage New Zealand.

== Demographics ==
Mount Cook, comprising the statistical areas of Mount Cook North, Mount Cook South and Mount Cook East, covers 1.05 km^{2} (0.41 sq mi). It had an estimated population of 7,180 as of June 2025, with a population density of 6,838 people per km^{2}.

Historical population
Year	Pop.	±% p.a.
2006	6,513	—
2013	6,603	+0.20%
2018	6,861	+0.77%
2023	6,690	−0.50%

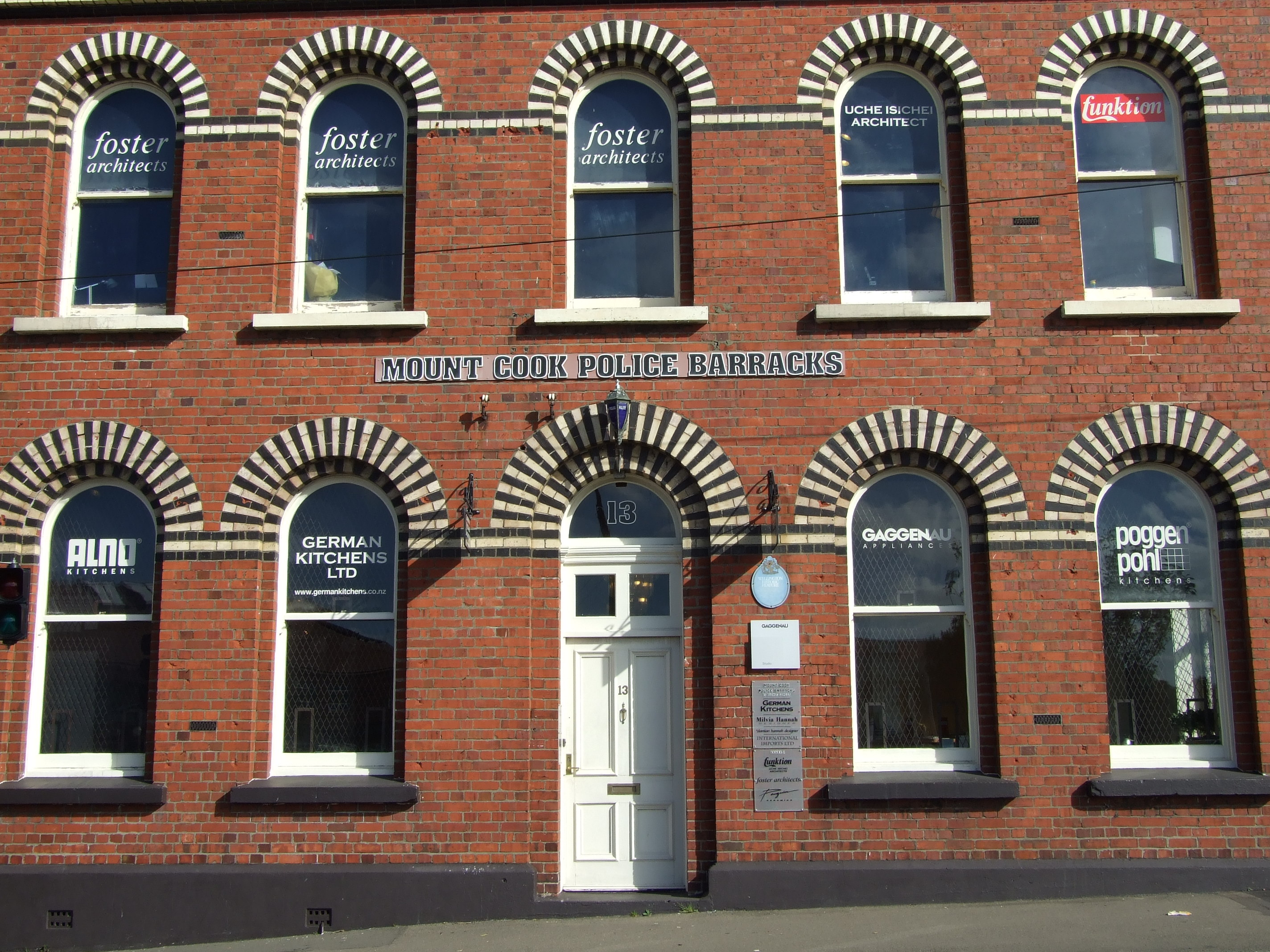
Former Mount Cook Police Barracks, now commercial offices

Mount Cook had a population of 6,690 in the 2023 New Zealand census, a decrease of 171 people (−2.5%) since the 2018 census, and an increase of 87 people (1.3%) since the 2013 census. There were 3,183 males, 3,309 females, and 198 people of other genders in 2,727 dwellings. 18.6% of people identified as LGBTIQ+. The median age was 26.7 years (compared with 38.1 years nationally). There were 360 people (5.4%) aged under 15 years, 3,606 (53.9%) aged 15 to 29, 2,298 (34.3%) aged 30 to 64, and 423 (6.3%) aged 65 or older.

People could identify as more than one ethnicity. The results were 69.5% European (Pākehā); 11.8% Māori; 4.1% Pasifika; 20.5% Asian; 6.5% Middle Eastern, Latin American and African New Zealanders (MELAA); and 1.8% other, which includes people giving their ethnicity as "New Zealander". English was spoken by 96.7%, Māori by 3.2%, Samoan by 1.1%, and other languages by 25.3%. No language could be spoken by 1.0% (e.g. too young to talk). New Zealand Sign Language was known by 0.6%. The percentage of people born overseas was 37.5, compared with 28.8% nationally.

Religious affiliations were 18.4% Christian, 3.1% Hindu, 3.4% Islam, 0.4% Māori religious beliefs, 2.0% Buddhist, 0.7% New Age, 0.4% Jewish, and 2.3% other religions. People who answered that they had no religion were 64.7%, and 4.9% of people did not answer the census question.

Of those at least 15 years old, 2,688 (42.5%) people had a bachelor's or higher degree, 2,811 (44.4%) had a post-high school certificate or diploma, and 831 (13.1%) people exclusively held high school qualifications. The median income was $36,500, compared with $41,500 nationally. 765 people (12.1%) earned over $100,000 compared to 12.1% nationally. The employment status of those at least 15 was 3,351 (52.9%) full-time, 1,161 (18.3%) part-time, and 399 (6.3%) unemployed.

Individual statistical areas
Name	Area (km^{2})	Population	Density (per km^{2})	Dwellings	Median age	Median income
Mount Cook North	0.26	2,964	11,400	1,344	27.3 years	$33,200
Mount Cook South	0.35	1,077	3,077	393	28.5 years	$51,300
Mount Cook East	0.44	2,646	6,014	993	25.6 years	$35,100
New Zealand					38.1 years	$41,500

== Education ==
Wellington High School and Community Education Centre is a state co-educational secondary (years 9–15) school. It has a roll of 1,642 as of July 2026. It opened in 1886 as Wellington College of Design, in an existing building on the Featherston Street and Branston Street corner. In 1891 it moved into its own building on Mercer Street and became Wellington Technical College. It moved again to Wakefield Street in 1899, and to Taranaki Street in 1922. The school's name changed from Wellington Technical High School to Wellington High School in 1964.

Mount Cook School is a state co-educational full (years 1–8) primary school. It has a roll of 297 as of July 2026. It opened in 1875 as Buckle Street Girls' School, with a boys' school sharing the site until it moved to its own premises in 1878 to become Taranaki Street Boys' School. Mt Cook Infants' School opened across the road from the girls' school in 1877. The three schools merged into Mount Cook Main School on Buckle Street in 1926. It moved to Tory Street in the mid 1970s.

Massey University's Wellington campus is in Mount Cook.
