= Chris Coney =

New Zealand cricketer

Personal information
- Full name: Christopher John Coney
- Born: 21 August 1945; Auckland, New Zealand
- Batting: Left-handed
- Bowling: Left-arm orthodox
- Relatives: Jeremy Coney (brother)

Domestic team information
- Years: Team
- 1966/67: Wellington

Career statistics
Competition	First-class
Matches	2
Runs scored	19
Batting average	4.75
100s/50s	0/0
Top score	13
Balls bowled	156
Wickets	3
Bowling average	20.33
5 wickets in innings	0
10 wickets in match	0
Best bowling	2/29
Catches/stumpings	2/–
- Source: Cricinfo, 23 October 2020

Christopher John Coney (born 21 August 1945) is a former New Zealand cricketer who played two matches of first-class cricket in the 1960s.

Chris Coney is the oldest of three brothers. Jeremy Coney, who went on to captain the New Zealand Test cricket team, is the youngest. Their father worked for the Reserve Bank of New Zealand in Wellington.

A middle-order batsman and left-arm spin bowler, Chris Coney represented Wellington at under-20 and under-23 levels for several seasons in the 1960s. He played a first-class match for New Zealand Under-23s in 1965–66 and one for Wellington against the touring Australians in 1966–67.

Coney and his wife Judy took up organic farming at Te Puna in the Bay of Plenty region. They have four children.
