= Richie Romanos =

New Zealand cricketer (1929–2018)

Personal information
- Full name: Richard Francis Romanos
- Born: 28 October 1929; Wellington, New Zealand
- Died: 21 September 2018 (aged 88); Wellington, New Zealand
- Batting: Right-handed
- Role: Batsman
- Relatives: Joseph Romanos (son)

Domestic team information
- Years: Team
- 1951–52: Wellington

Career statistics
Competition	First-class
Matches	2
Runs scored	20
Batting average	5.00
100s/50s	0/0
Top score	9
Balls bowled	0
Wickets	–
Bowling average	–
5 wickets in innings	–
10 wickets in match	–
Best bowling	–
Catches/stumpings	0/0
- Source: Cricinfo, 26 October 2020

Richard Francis Romanos (28 October 1929 – 21 September 2018) was a New Zealand cricketer who played two first-class matches for Wellington in the 1950s.

Romanos was born in Wellington to parents who had migrated to New Zealand from Lebanon. He attended St Patrick's College in Wellington.

He played two matches in the Plunket Shield as batsman in the 1951–52 season, but was not successful, scoring 20 runs in all. His son Joseph is a journalist and sports writer.
