= Edgar Stahmer =

German music educator

Edgar Stahmer (1911–1996) was a German music educator, most known for popularising the bowed psaltery (German: Streichpsalter), which he developed in the 1930s for music education in German schools. The instrument had earlier been patented by Clemens Neuber in 1925.
