= Bowed psaltery =

Musical instrument

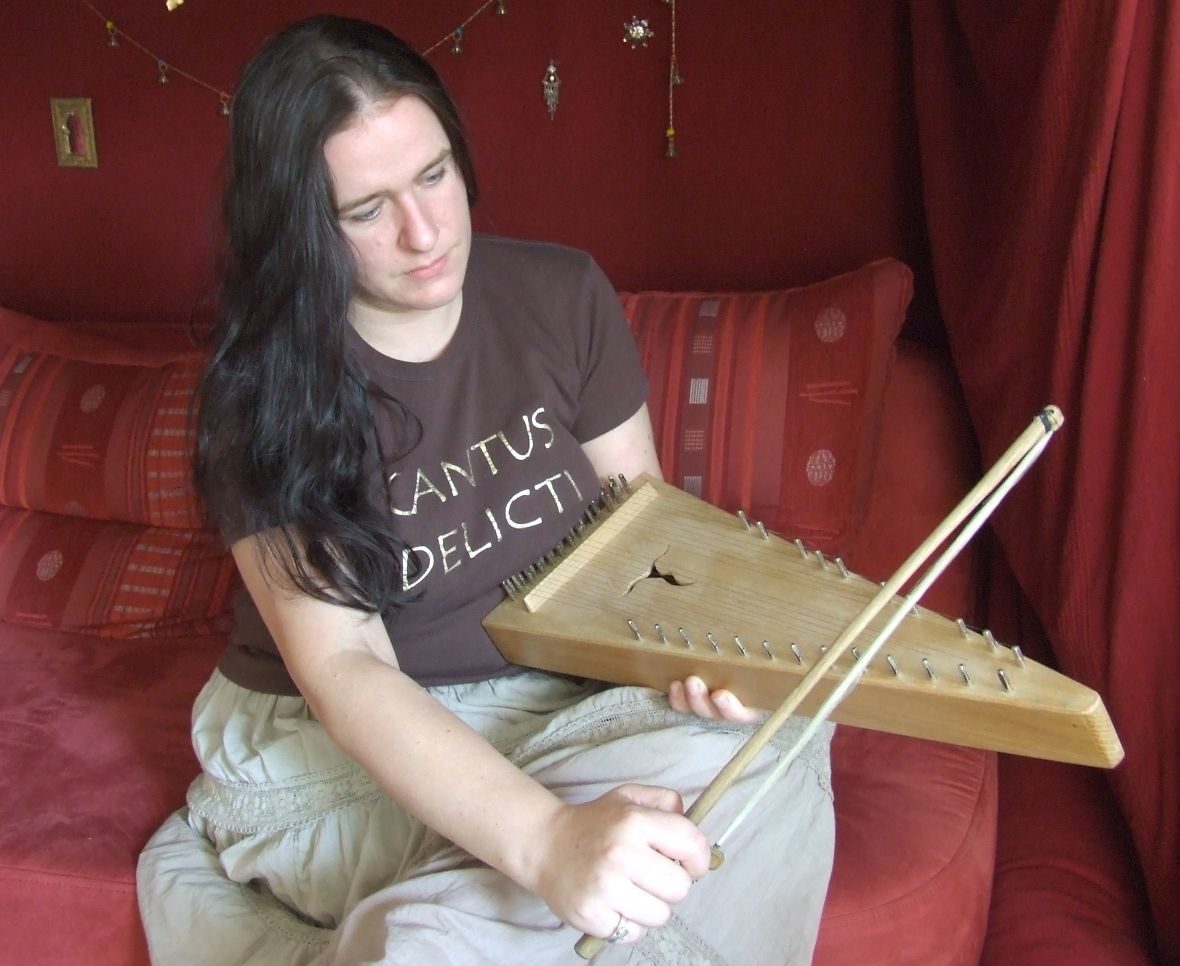
- Classification: Bowed string instrument

Related instruments
- Psaltery; Crwth; Vielle; Zither; Ukelin; Streichmelodion

The bowed psaltery is a type of psaltery or zither that is played with a bow. In contrast with the centuries-old plucked psaltery, the bowed psaltery appears to be a 20th-century invention.

== History ==
=== Violin zither ===
In 1925, a German patent was issued to the Clemens Neuber Company for a bowed psaltery which also included a set of strings arranged in chords, so that one could play the melody on the bowed psaltery strings, and strum the accompaniment with the other hand. These are usually called "violin zithers".

=== Ukelin-type instruments ===

Similar instruments were being produced by American companies of the same time period, often with Hawaiian-inspired names, such as Hawaiian Art Violin or Violin-Uke, and marketed for use in playing the Hawaiian music, which was popular in the United States in the 1920s. These instruments are not typically referred to as psalteries, but by the various trade names they were sold under, such as Ukelin.

=== The conventional bowed psaltery ===
Today, the bowed psaltery is most often produced without chord accompaniment strings (though some modern players retune the chromatic side to produce chords, and play it in the manner of the violin zither).

After the Second World War, Walter Mittman, a primary school teacher in Westphalia, popularized the conventional triangular bowed psaltery, which had earlier been advocated for use in education by the German Edgar Stahmer (1911–1996).

== Description ==
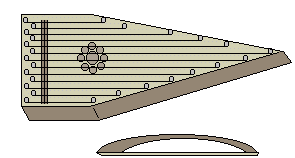
A chromatic bowed psaltery. The construction style is often influenced by the looks of Mediæval plucked psalteries, as well as Gothic architecture.

The conventional bowed psaltery is triangular, allowing each string to extend a little farther than the one before it, so that each can be individually bowed. Chromatic bowed psalteries have the sharps and flats on one side and the diatonic notes on the opposite.

It is a psaltery in the traditional sense of a wooden sound box with unstopped strings over the soundboard. It significantly differs from the Medieval plucked psaltery only in that its strings are arranged to permit bowing. The soundboard has a sound hole or rose in the center. In the United States, it is normally played with a small bow, often made in the earlier semicircular style, whereas in Europe a reduced-size modern violin bow is used.

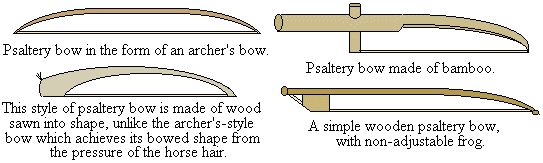

== Method of playing ==
Performance styles vary, but the instrument may be played either one note at a time, with the instrument held with one hand and bowed with the other, as in instruments of the violin family, or it may be laid down and played with a bow in each hand, in a style reminiscent of the closely related hammered dulcimer. Some players will also hold two bows in one hand to facilitate double-stopping.

Other than bowing, the instrument may also be strummed or struck for additional tone colors. The strings are often too closely spaced for conventional finger picking, but may be plucked at the bowing end.

== See also ==
- Alexander violin
- Streichmelodion
