= Josef Lidl =

Czech musical instrument manufacturer

- Industry: Musical instruments
- Founded: 1892; 133 years ago
- Founder: Josef Lidl
- Headquarters: Brno, Czech Republic
- Products: Brass instruments
- Website: josef-lidl.cz

Josef Lidl is a Czech manufacturer of musical instruments. It was founded in Moravia in 1892, and is the oldest manufacturer of instruments in the Czech Republic. The company is based in Brno.

The company specialises in brass instruments including tubas, flugelhorns, horns, trumpets and natural horns.

The horn played by journalist Jasper Rees and described in his book I Found My Horn is a Lidl.
