= The Mantis and the Cricket: Tales from the Tours =

- Genre: Documentary; Sports
- Presented by: Jeremy Coney
- Country of origin: New Zealand
- Original language: English

Production
- Producer: Sky

Original release
- Network: Sky Sport
- Release: 2001

The Mantis and the Cricket: Tales from the Tours is a New Zealand television documentary series hosted by Jeremy Coney recounting overseas tours by the New Zealand national cricket team featuring interviews with former New Zealand cricketers. The show's name features Coney's nickname of "Mantis".

== Overview ==
Sky Television executive, and former cricketer, Martin Crowe envisaged the show and green-light its production. The show, which was first broadcast in 2001, looked back on New Zealand's cricket history, using interviews by Coney with former players and historical footage. The first episodes were about the 1937 New Zealand team which toured England and featured interviews with Walter Hadlee, Merv Wallace, Jack Kerr and Lindsay Weir. It also included recorded footage of players who predeceased the broadcast of the show such as Bert Sutcliffe.

== Reception ==
Lynn McConnell of ESPN reviewed the show and Coney's presenting positively and stated it to be "...one of the jewels of television in New Zealand" and "For anyone even remotely interested in cricket, this is must-see television."
