= William Wakefield Memorial =

Memorial in Wellington, New Zealand

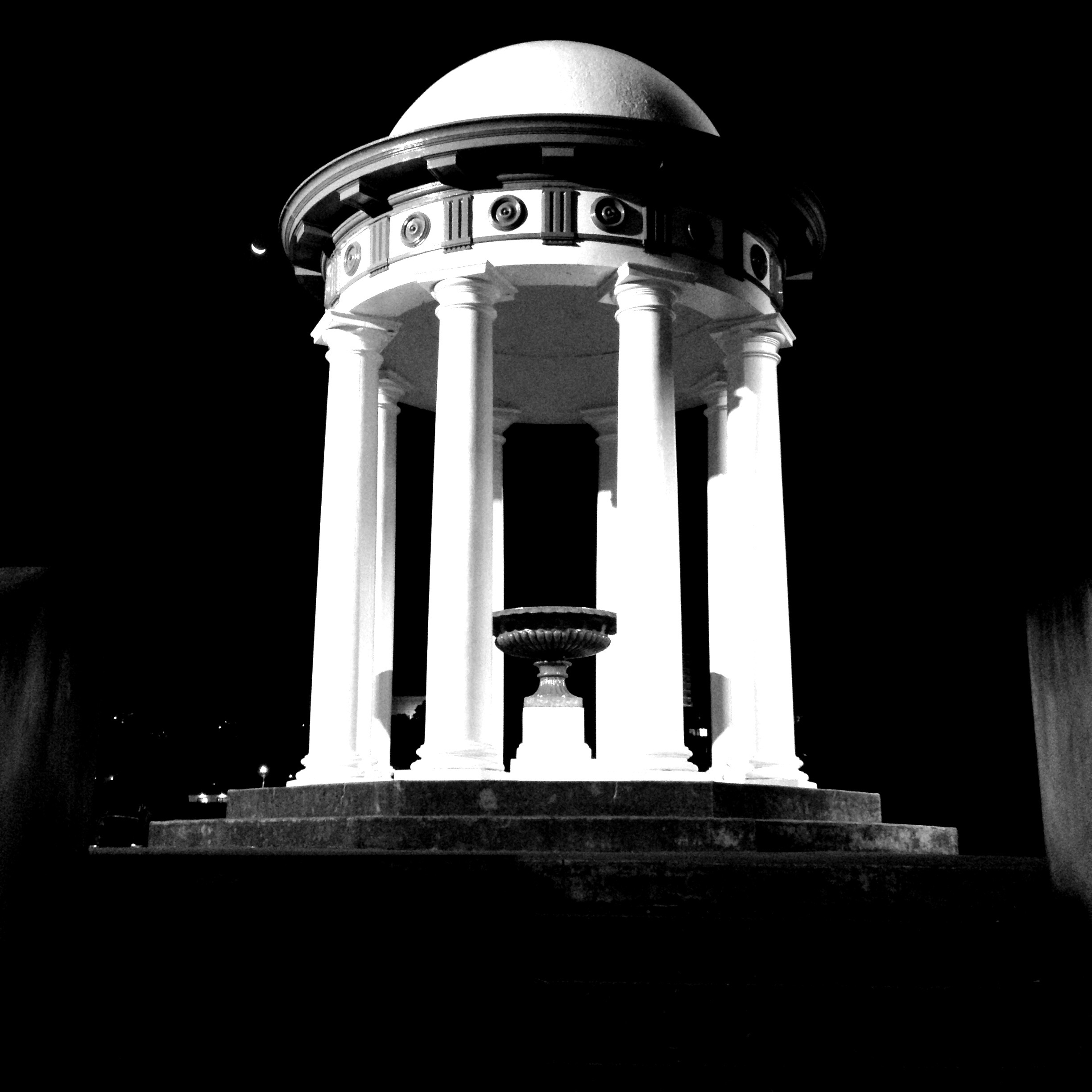
- The William Wakefield Memorial in 2012
- Interactive map of William Wakefield Memorial
- Location: Basin Reserve, Wellington, New Zealand
- Coordinates: 41°18′02″S 174°46′53″E
- Completion date: 1882
- Dedicated to: William Wakefield

Heritage New Zealand – Category 1
- Official name: William Wakefield Memorial
- Designated: 22 June 2007
- Reference no.: 1441

The William Wakefield Memorial is a rare New Zealand example of an early memorial commemorating one of the original European settlers. It was ordered in 1850, some time after the death of William Wakefield, an important but controversial agent for the New Zealand Company. It was not put up until 1882, but even after then, it was rare to commemorate settlers with a memorial. Originally placed in the Basin Reserve, the main cricket ground in Wellington, it was relocated to outside the cricket ground, before being restored in 2006 by Wellington City Council and placed close to its original location.

== History ==
Wakefield arrived in New Zealand in 1839 as principal agent for the New Zealand Company. He was regarded as Wellington's first leader, and when he died in 1848, his friends raised the funds for a memorial, which was ordered from England; sources vary whether this was done in 1850, in the early 1850s, or in 1862. The New Zealand Company's reputation deteriorated significantly, and the memorial was not installed, but put in storage in Bethune and Hunter's yard for many years. William Barnard Rhodes, another prominent early Wellington settler, put up £50 towards the installation of the memorial in 1876. In March 1882, Wellington City Council committee tasked the City Surveyor with finding a suitable site for the memorial, and the structure was temporarily put on public display in a council yard. Soon afterwards, the committee resolved to install the memorial at the Basin Reserve. In 1886, a drinking fountain was added; this had first been suggested by Rhodes.

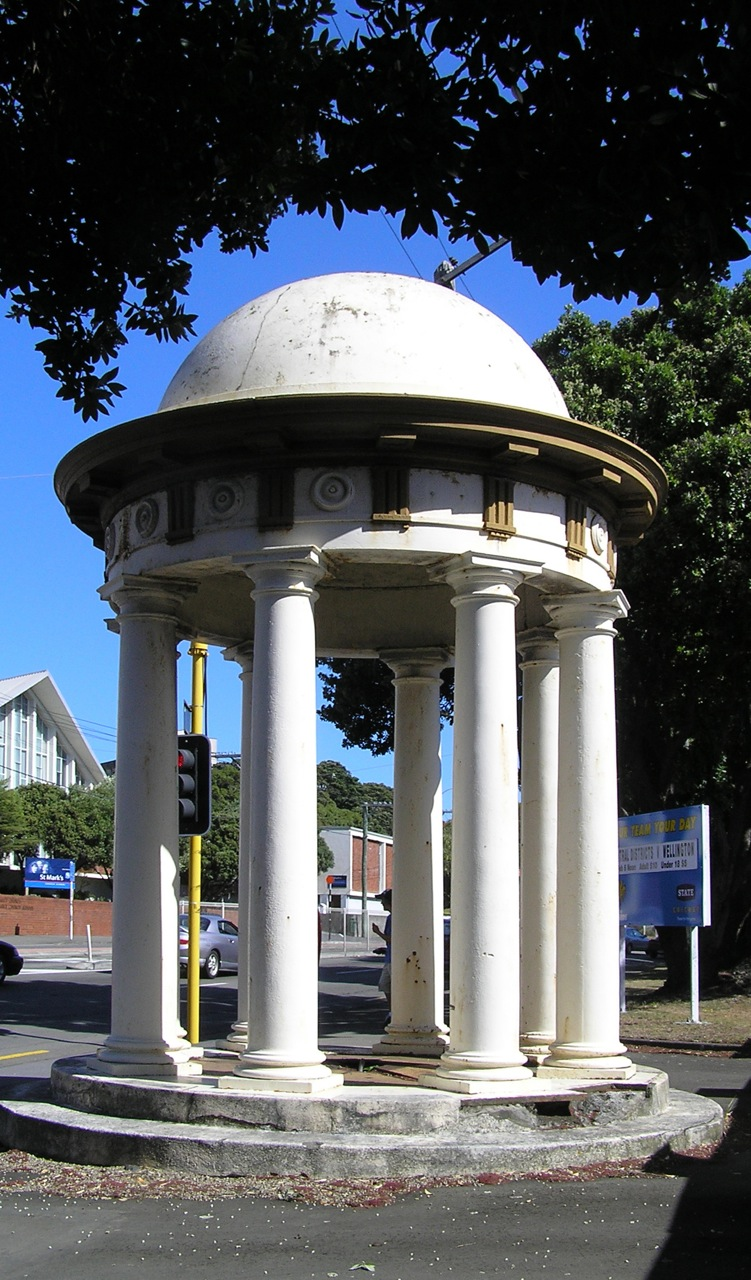
The William Wakefield Memorial in 2005 prior to its relocation to its current position

The cricket grounds were overhauled in 1917 and as part of this, the William Wakefield Memorial was relocated to the outside of the grounds. The drinking fountain stopped operating in the 1940s, and the memorial slowly deteriorated but also suffered from vandalism. In 1968, the monument was described as "beyond repair". The drinking fountain was removed during the 1980s.

Wellington City Council put money towards restoration into their budget in 2004, and the work was carried out in 2006. This included the relocation close to its original position, a structural upgrade, and the reinstatement of the drinking fountain.

== Heritage listing ==
The William Wakefield Memorial was registered as a Category I heritage structure by the New Zealand Historic Places Trust with registration number 1441.
