= Jeremy Coney =

New Zealand cricketer (born 1952)

Jeremy Coney MBE
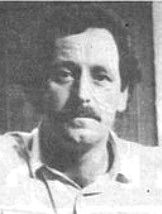
- Coney in 1987

Personal information
- Full name: Jeremy Vernon Coney
- Born: 21 June 1952 (age 74); Wellington, New Zealand
- Batting: Right-handed
- Bowling: Right arm medium
- Relatives: Chris Coney (brother); Julie Coney (former wife); Tom Jones (grandson); Murray Halberg (second cousin)

International information
- National side: New Zealand (1974–1987)
- Test debut (cap 129): 5 January 1974 v Australia
- Last Test: 15 March 1987 v West Indies
- ODI debut (cap 31): 9 June 1979 v Sri Lanka
- Last ODI: 28 March 1987 v West Indies

Domestic team information
- Years: Team
- 1971/72–1986/87: Wellington

Career statistics
Competition	Test	ODI	FC	LA
Matches	52	88	165	127
Runs scored	2,668	1,874	7,872	2,763
Batting average	37.57	30.72	35.14	31.39
100s/50s	3/16	0/8	8/47	0/14
Top score	174*	66*	174*	73*
Balls bowled	2,835	2,931	8,993	3,881
Wickets	27	54	111	71
Bowling average	35.77	37.75	31.17	38.26
5 wickets in innings	0	0	1	0
10 wickets in match	0	0	0	0
Best bowling	3/28	4/46	6/17	4/46
Catches/stumpings	64/–	40/–	192/–	57/–
- Source: Cricinfo, 22 January 2010

Jeremy Vernon Coney (born 21 June 1952) is a former New Zealand cricketer and current cricket commentator. An all-rounder, between 1974 and 1987 he played 52 Test matches and 88 One Day Internationals (ODIs) for New Zealand, of which he was captain in 15 Tests and 25 ODIs.

== International career ==
Coney made 16 Test fifties. His first of three centuries came after nine years when he was 31. He only lost one Test series as captain, against Pakistan away, and he was a Wisden Cricketer of the Year in 1984.

In 1986, after England wicketkeeper Bruce French was injured by a Hadlee bouncer, Coney allowed Bob Taylor to leave the sponsor's tent and play as a substitute. New Zealand won that series with the bowling of Richard Hadlee only slightly more potent than the captaincy of Coney. His medium-pace bowling was often used in ODIs, where it yielded 54 wickets, with best figures of four for 46 recorded against Sri Lanka in 1985.

== Beyond cricket ==
During his playing days, Coney's height, reach and reactions as a slip fieldsman, earned him the nickname "The Mantis". He wrote Playing Mantis: An Autobiography in 1986. Along with John Parker and Bryan Waddle, he wrote The Wonderful Days of Summer in 1993.

In the 1986 Queen's Birthday Honours, Coney was appointed a Member of the Order of the British Empire, for services to cricket. In 1990, he was awarded the New Zealand 1990 Commemoration Medal.

In 2001 he made a television documentary series, The Mantis and the Cricket: Tales from the Tours, which looked back on New Zealand's cricket history, using interviews with former players and historical footage. The first part follows the 1937 New Zealand Cricket team which toured England with interviews of Walter Hadlee, Merv Wallace, Jack Kerr and Lindsay Weir.

He now lives in south Oxfordshire and works as a commentator/summariser for Sky TV and Test Match Special, where he is noted for his regular use of the word "parsimonious". He commentates for radio during New Zealand's home matches during the summer. Coney is trained as a stage lighting designer; in 2008 he lit I Found My Horn, a solo play which has enjoyed runs at the Tristan Bates and the Hampstead theatres.

Sporting positions
Preceded by Geoff Howarth	New Zealand national cricket captain 1984/85-1986/7	Succeeded by Jeff Crowe
