= Joseph Romanos =

New Zealand journalist, author and broadcaster

Joseph Romanos (born 1957) is a New Zealand journalist, author and broadcaster focusing mainly on sport.

== Life and career ==
Romanos attended St Patrick's College in Wellington. His father Richie Romanos played cricket for Wellington in the 1951–52 Plunket Shield season.

Romanos has worked on a number of New Zealand newspapers. In 2008 he became editor of The Wellingtonian and in 2012 he also became The Dominion Post's Metro chief reporter. He was the New Zealand Sports Hall of Fame's executive director from 1995 to 1998.

Romanos and his wife Gael Woods have four children. Together with Phil Murray, the couple founded the publishing house Trio Books in 2003.

In October 2016, Romanos joined the Wellington City Council as Chief Advisor to Justin Lester in the Mayor's Office. In January 2017, while driving from Mākara, he and Lester were involved in a crash. All the passengers walked away unhurt, however the Council vehicle they were travelling in was damaged beyond repair.

== Books ==
=== As sole author ===
- Chris Lewis: All the Way to Wimbledon 1984
- Makers of Champions: Great NZ Coaches 1987
- Famous Fullbacks 1989
- Famous Flankers 1990
- Great New Zealand Cricket Families: A Celebration 1992
- A Century of Great New Zealand Cricketers 1993
- Arthur's Boys: The Golden Era of New Zealand Athletics 1994
- Tortured Genius 1995 (on Martin Crowe)
- Black 1997 (a novel)
- John Reid: A Cricketing Life 2000
- Merv Wallace: A Cricket Master 2000
- Judas Game: The Betrayal of New Zealand Rugby 2002
- Great Sporting Rivals 2004
- Cricket Confidential: The Game's Greatest Players, Matches and Disputes 2005
- New Zealand's Top 100 History-Makers 2005, 2008
- New Zealand's Top 100 Sports History-Makers 2006
- Winning Ways: Champion New Zealand Coaches Reveal Their Secrets 2007
- Our Olympic Century 2008
- Cricket Portraits: A Century of New Zealand's Best 2008
- Long or Short?: The Story of New Zealand Squash 2010
- 100 Māori Sports Heroes 2012
- Unforgettable: Defining Moments in New Zealand Sport 2014

=== As co-author ===
- 100 Great Rugby Characters (with Grant Harding; illustrations by Murray Webb) 1991
- Champions: New Zealand Sports Greats of the 20th Century (with Ron Palenski) 2000
- The Basin: An Illustrated History of the Basin Reserve (with Don Neely) 2003
- Lancaster Park: An Illustrated History (with Don Neely) 2006
- No Ordinary Man: The Remarkable Life of Arthur Porritt (with Graeme Woodfield) 2008
- Capital People: The Best of the Wellingtonian Interviews (with Rebecca Thomson) 2011

=== As editor ===
- The Big Black Netball Book (with Gael Woods) 1992
- Sporting Life: The Best of Broadcaster, Peter Sellers 1992
- We Knocked the Bastard Off: Great New Zealand Sports Quotes 1994
- I'm Absolutely Buggered: More Great New Zealand Sports Quotes 1994
- Radio Sport New Zealand Sporting Records & Lists 2001

=== As collaborator with principal author ===
- Lois Muir on Netball (by Lois Muir) 1985
- Fastbreak (by John Dybvig) 1986
- John Dybvig on Basketball (by John Dybvig) 1987
- The Innings of a Lifetime (by Walter Hadlee) 1993
- Sandra Edge: Full Circle: An Autobiography (by Sandra Edge) 1995
- Striking Out (by Kevin Herlihy) 1997
- Legends of the All Blacks: One: The Book of the Series (by Keith Quinn) 1999
- Outrageous Rugby Moments: Stories of Controversy, Humour, Scandal and Disgrace (by Keith Quinn) 2001
- Outrageous Cricket Moments: The Underhanded, the Undermined, the Underperforming and, of Course, the Underarm (by Ian Smith) 2003
