= Jasper Rees =

English journalist and writer

- Occupations: Journalist and writer
- Known for: Authorised biographer of Victoria Wood

Jasper Rees is an English journalist and writer. He specialises in writing about the arts and is best known as the authorised biographer of comedian and actress Victoria Wood.

== Life and career ==
Rees has been a journalist since 1988 and has written mostly for the Daily Telegraph and The Independent. He is also the author of five books, including Let's Do It, the authorised biography of comedian and actress Victoria Wood.

Rees has written about his Welsh heritage in his 2011 memoir Bred of Heaven. The book caused controversy when Rees was upset by a review in the Daily Mail by journalist Roger Lewis, who called Welsh a "moribund monkey language". Member of Parliament Jonathan Edwards also referred the review to both the Press Complaints Commission and the police.

In 2010, Rees released his book I Found My Horn, which was adapted for the stage. He also wrote a biography of Florence Foster Jenkins in 2016, which was adapted into the film of the same name starring Meryl Streep and Hugh Grant.

In October 2026, Rees published Michael Gambon: The Authorised Biography, published by Century.

== Books ==
- A Devil to Play: One Man's Year-long Quest to Master the Orchestra's Most Difficult Instrument (HarperCollins, 2008 ISBN 9780061979712)
- I Found My Horn: One Man's Struggle with the Orchestra's Most Difficult Instrument (Orion, 2010 ISBN 9780753826430)
- Bred of Heaven: One man's quest to reclaim his Welsh roots (Profile, 2011 ISBN 9781847654229)
- Florence Foster Jenkins, a biography written to coincide with Nicholas Martin's screenplay for the eponymous film starring Meryl Streep (St Martin's, 2016 ISBN 9781250115966)
- Let's Do It: The Authorised Biography of Victoria Wood (Orion, 2016 ISBN 9781409184126)
- Michael Gambon: The Authorised Biography (Century, 2026 ISBN 1529963338)
