= Minor Associations cricket team =

The Minor Associations cricket team, representing the Minor Associations in New Zealand, appeared once at first-class level, playing against the touring Australians at the Basin Reserve in March 1921. The Australians batted first and made 271, then the Minor Associations made 124 and 141, losing by an innings and six runs.

The Minor Associations team included players from the Manawatu, Nelson, North Taranaki, Poverty Bay, Rangitikei, Wairarapa and Wanganui associations. As Hawke's Bay and Southland were still competing at first-class level, their players were not considered. The team included only three men whose careers amounted to more than a handful of first-class games: Ces Dacre, David Collins and Bill Bernau. For six of the team it was their only first-class match.

Collins was the sole selector and the captain. He finished off the Australians' innings by taking four wickets for no runs in one eight-ball over: two bowled and two leg before wicket.

The Minor Associations team also played a non-first-class match against one of the Plunket Shield teams in most seasons in the 1920s and 1930s. When the Minor Associations gained collective first-class status with the advent of the Central Districts and Northern Districts teams in the 1950s, there was no further need for a Minor Associations team.

== List of first-class players ==
A team of 12 was selected for the match, with John Heskett from North Taranaki originally selected in the starting XI. Heskett was unable to play and twelfth man Ray London replaced him in the team. The match was the only first-class fixture that Arkwright, Blair, Drake, London, McVicar, and Schollum played, although all appeared regularly for their representative teams in the Hawke Cup. Heskett never made a first-class appearance.

- Henry Arkwright (Rangitikei) (Note: The team's wicket-keeper, Arkwright was born at Kensington in London in 1882 and educated at Winchester College before moving to New Zealand in 1901. In 1906 he took over the running of the Overton estate at Marton from his uncle Francis Arkwright. He played cricket for Whanganui during the 1906–07 season and for West Coast the following season, and was influential in the development of the sport in Rangitikei. He played for Marton Cricket Club, founded the traveling New Zealand Nomads Cricket Club in 1907, and played Hawke Cup cricket for Rangitikei between 1910–11 and 1922–23. Described as a "very safe and sound" wicket-keeper and "a good steady bat" who scored runs on the leg side, Arkwright recorded a duck in his first innings and scored two runs in his second in what was to be his only first-class appearance. He managed the New Zealand team which toured England in 1927 and was president of the New Zealand Cricket Council in 1927–28. Arkwright served in the New Zealand Expeditionary Force during World War I, reaching the rank of lieutenant in the Wellington Regiment and serving in Europe. He died at Marton in 1956.)
- Bill Bernau (Whanganui)
- William Blair (Poverty Bay) (Note: Described as a "sound and patient" left-handed batsman who bowled slow left-arm deliveries with a "peculiar flight", Blair played Hawke Cup cricket for Poverty Bay from the 1918–19 season until 1920–21. He was born at Auckland in 1896, played cricket at school, for Eden Cricket Club, and captained the Auckland colts team. He trained with the Auckland senior team but left the city before he was called into the representative team, moving to Gisborne. He made scores of 15 and two in the match against the Australians, and in 1922–23 played for an East Coast Associations team against the touring English team led by Archie MacLaren at Napier. He was active in cricket for many years, was a Poverty Bay selector and managed the representative 'B' team. Professionally Blair work as a clerk. He served in the New Zealand Expeditionary Force during World War I, spending a short period with the Wellington Regiment in France in late 1917 before being declared unfit for service due to illness. As well as cricket, Blair played both rugby and hockey. He died at Gisborne in 1978.)
- David Collins (Wairarapa)
- Ces Dacre (Wairarapa)
- Tasman Drake (Poverty Bay)
- Chester Holland (Whanganui)
- Raymond London (Whanganui) (Note: Originally selected as the team's twelfth man, Pat London played in the match in place of John Heskett, the only member the team from North Taranaki, who was unable to play in the match due to business commitments. London was born at Pahiatua in Wairarapa in 1894 before moving to Whanganui with his family in 1901. He enlisted in the New Zealand Medical Corps at the start of World War I and served overseas, reaching the rank of sergeant and being awarded the Military Medal for bravery whilst serving on the Western Front in France. After he was demobilised he established a firm of gentlemen's outfitters in Whanganui with PJ Markham. Considered a "good forceful and free bat" who scored runs square of the wicket with "splendid strokes", London scored only six runs against the Australians. He played Hawke Cup cricket for Whanganui between 1912–13 and 1924–25, playing at a time when the association was considered one of the strongest Minor Associations and won the cup several times. He captained the Whanganui team regularly and also played rugby union, later becoming the secretary of the Whanganui Rugby Football Union; he coached both sports at St George's School in the city. Later in life London was active in the local Rotary Club, serving as president in the year before his sudden death at the age of 51 in 1946.)
- Alec McVicar (Manawatu) (Note: A stalwart of the Manawatu team who played 75 times for the representative team between 1911–12 and 1934–35, by which time he was 50 years of age, McVicar was considered an all-rounder, although he did not bowl against the Australians. Born at Wellington in 1885, he was educated at Mt Cook High School in the city and worked as a train driver. He played club cricket regularly and was considered a keen "cricket enthusiast". He later coached cricket. Two of his sons played first-class cricket: Colin McVicar for Central Districts and Stuart McVicar for Wellington and New Zealand Services. Both also played for Manawatu and the practice facilities at Fitzherbert Park in Palmerston North are named after the family. McVicar died at Palmerston North in 1964 at the age of 79.)
- Edgar Neale (Nelson)
- Jock Schollum (Poverty Bay) (Note: Wenzl John Schollum was born at Puhoi in North Auckland in 1886 before moving to Gisborne in his twenties to farm. He later ran a hotel and worked in the wine trade. Considered a good bowler but a poor batsman, he played Hawke Cup cricket for Poverty Bay between 1913–14 and 1926–27 and in club cricket for the Cosmopolitan Club in Gisborne. Married with seven children, Schollum died at Auckland in 1941 where he was being treated after having been in poor health for a year before his death.)
