= Harry Barker (mayor) =

Mayor Harry Barker with HM Queen Elizabeth II on 6 January 1954

Sir Harry Heaton Barker KBE (18 July 1898 – 18 May 1994) was a New Zealand newspaper journalist and editor, local politician, and founder of the Four Square supermarket chain. He was mayor of Gisborne for 27 years.

== Early life and family ==
Barker was born in Nelson, New Zealand on 18 July 1898. His father, John Heaton Barker, was the founder of the Four Square supermarket chain. The family moved to Wellington in 1902 and Auckland in 1912. Barker spent his final school year at New Plymouth Boys' High School as a boarder.

Barker enlisted for military service during World War I, initially falsifying his age until he was found out. He fell ill in the 1918 influenza pandemic. He came to Gisborne in 1920 to work as a reporter for The Gisborne Times (which, after a couple of mergers, became The Gisborne Herald in 1939). He moved to Auckland in 1923 on his father's request, but soon returned to Gisborne, this time for the rest of his life. In Gisborne on 18 February 1926, Barker married Anita Pearl Greaves; there were no children from the marriage.

== Political career ==
He stood in the 1943 and 1946 elections in the Gisborne electorate for the National Party, but could not unseat the incumbent, David Coleman.

From 1950, he was mayor of Gisborne for nine consecutive three-year terms. He died on 18 May 1994, having been predeceased by his wife the previous year, and was buried at Taruheru Cemetery.

== Honours and awards ==
Barker was awarded the Queen Elizabeth II Coronation Medal in 1953, and the Queen Elizabeth II Silver Jubilee Medal in 1977.

In the 1964 New Year Honours, Barker was appointed an Officer of the Order of the British Empire. In the 1972 Queen's Birthday Honours, he was promoted to Commander of the same order. Following the end of his time as mayor, Barker was knighted as a Knight Commander of the Order of the British Empire in the 1978 New Year Honours, for services to the city of Gisborne.

In the 1974 Queen's Birthday Honours, Anita Barker was appointed a Member of the Order of the British Empire, for services to local government and the community.

In the late 1960s a recreational reserve containing several cricket grounds was developed in Gisborne and named the Harry Barker Reserve. It is the headquarters and main home ground of the Poverty Bay Cricket Association.
