= George Anson (doctor) =

New Zealand cricketer and medical doctor (1850–1934)

Dr George Anson

George Edward Anson (27 September 1850 – 15 July 1934) was a New Zealand cricketer and medical doctor from the Anson family.

== Family ==
George Anson was born in Sudbury, Derbyshire, England, on 27 September 1850. His father was Frederick Anson, Canon of Windsor, and his uncle was George Edward Anson, private secretary to Prince Albert. His mother was formerly the Hon. Caroline Vernon, a member of the Vernon family of Sudbury and Hilton. His maternal grandfather was the fifth Baron Vernon. George was the third of fourteen children.

He married Margaret Greenstreet, a New Zealander, in Christchurch, New Zealand, on 19 October 1891. They had three sons and a daughter.

== Life and career ==
George Anson was educated at Eton College for two years before being privately educated. He went up to Trinity College, Cambridge, where he took a degree in 1873. In 1874 he sailed to New Zealand to join a friend who had taken up farming. After farming himself for some years he accepted a position as second master at Wanganui Collegiate School.

In December 1879 he captained the West Coast cricket team from Wanganui in its first and only first-class match. The West Coast team defeated Wellington in Wellington by six wickets. Anson made 2 in his only innings and did not bowl. It was his only first-class match.

In 1881 he donated the Anson Cup to the Wanganui Tennis Club for the men's singles champion. The first winner was his fellow West Coast cricketer William Barton. The cup is still contested annually.

In 1883 Anson returned to Cambridge to complete his medical studies. On graduation in 1889 he took up the position of house surgeon at St Thomas' Hospital, London, before becoming a ship's surgeon. On one of his voyages, on the Rimutaka, he met his future wife, who was the cousin of the captain.

Anson bought a medical practice in Wellington in 1891 and remained in practice there until he retired in 1930. He was Honorary Visiting Physician, Wellington Hospital, from 1893 to 1897, and Honorary Visiting Surgeon, Wellington Hospital, from 1898 to 1903. He was also the Chief Medical Officer for the AMP Society from 1891 to 1930.

Anson was one of the founding directors of the Wellington daily newspaper The Dominion in 1907 and remained on the board, serving as chairman for some years until his health began to decline in 1931. He died at his residence, "Sudbury", Main Street, Lower Hutt, on 15 July 1934, aged 83.
