= Chester Holland =

New Zealand cricketer (1888–1976)

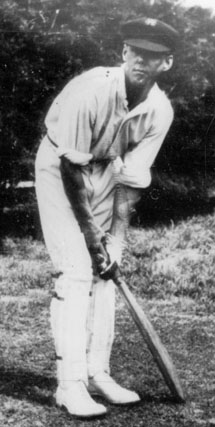

Personal information
- Full name: Chester Arthur Holland
- Born: 26 August 1888; Bunnythorpe, Manawatu, New Zealand
- Died: 10 November 1976 (aged 88); Wellington, New Zealand
- Batting: Left-handed
- Bowling: Right-arm fast-medium

Domestic team information
- Years: Team
- 1923/24–1924/25: Wellington

Career statistics
Competition	First-class
Matches	5
Runs scored	121
Batting average	25.09
100s/50s	0/1
Top score	54
Balls bowled	657
Wickets	6
Bowling average	62.16
5 wickets in innings	0
10 wickets in match	0
Best bowling	2/60
Catches/stumpings	3/–
- Source: CricketArchive, 18 November 2014

Chester Arthur Holland (26 August 1888 – 10 November 1976) was a New Zealand cricketer who played one match for New Zealand in the days before the country played Test cricket.

== Early life and career ==
Holland was born in Bunnythorpe and educated at Palmerston North Boys' High School. He moved to Wanganui in 1907. An opening bowler who also often made useful runs in the middle and lower order, Chester Holland spent most of his career playing non-first-class cricket for Wanganui. In 1909-10 he took 6 for 58 against the touring Australians. In 1912-13, when Wanganui played their first match in the Hawke Cup, Holland took 5 for 14 and 3 for 11 against South Taranaki, in a match Wanganui won by an innings and 393 runs. In 1913-14 Wanganui dominated the Hawke Cup, winning all three matches, Holland taking 33 wickets at an average of 8.39.

He took 4 for 79 for Wanganui against the touring Australians in February 1914, and after New Zealand's loss to Australia in the first of two international matches a few weeks later, several critics urged the selectors to choose talented players from outside the four main teams. The cricketer and clergyman Ernest Blamires said that of all bowlers in New Zealand none had impressed him as favourably as Holland: "He is a fast-medium bowler, and the off break that he gets on a fast wicket is remarkable." Holland was selected for his first-class debut in the second "test" as one of seven changes, alongside Len McMahon from Poverty Bay. However, Holland took only one expensive wicket and New Zealand lost by an innings.

Holland served as a rifleman in the New Zealand Rifle Brigade in World War I.

== Later career ==
Wanganui retained the Hawke Cup in 1914-15, when Holland took 24 wickets at 15.37. They finally lost the title to Poverty Bay in March 1919, despite Holland's 12 wickets for 83 in the match. In all club and representative matches in 1919-20, Holland took 94 wickets at 12.72 and made 934 runs at 44.47.

After taking 6 for 91 for Wanganui against the touring Australian team in March 1921, Holland played his second first-class match for a Minor Associations XI against the Australians a few days later, but took only one wicket. In 1922-23, when Wanganui again dominated the Hawke Cup, Holland took 10 for 35 and 4 for 44 against South Taranaki, the only instance of a bowler taking all 10 wickets in an innings in a Hawke Cup challenge match.

Still living in Wanganui, Holland was selected to play for Wellington in 1922-23 but had to withdraw owing to injury. The next season, at the age of 35, he played his first Plunket Shield match, for Wellington against Auckland, scoring 54 in the first innings and taking three wickets in a 365-run victory for Wellington. He played one more Plunket Shield match that season and another in 1924-25, but with little success. He returned to Hawke Cup cricket, taking 21 wickets in 1927-28 when Wanganui regained, but then lost, the title.

Holland holds the record for the most wickets taken in Hawke Cup challenge matches. In 24 challenge matches he took 189 wickets at an average of 11.65. He also made 1060 runs at an average of 31.17.
