= Douglas Cameron (cricketer) =

New Zealand cricketer

Personal information
- Full name: Douglas Archibald Cameron
- Born: March 21, 1903; Wanganui, New Zealand
- Died: 10 January 1996 (aged 92); Wanganui, New Zealand
- Batting: Right-handed

Domestic team information
- Years: Team
- 1929/30–1932/33: Wellington

Career statistics
Competition	First-class
Matches	4
Runs scored	158
Batting average	19.75
100s/50s	0/1
Top score	71
Catches/stumpings	1/–
- Source: Cricinfo, 10 February 2022

Douglas Archibald Cameron (21 March 1903 – 10 January 1996) was a cricketer who played first-class cricket for Wellington in the 1930s and had a long career in the Hawke Cup for Rangitikei and Wanganui from 1921 to 1953. He was a farmer.

== Life and career ==
Cameron's family lived on the estate "Glenmore" in the Turakina Valley. He attended Wanganui Collegiate School from 1917 to 1921 before taking up farming. He married Sylvia Cousins in Feilding in April 1937.

Cameron was an opening batsman. He made his highest first-class score in the Plunket Shield in January 1931 when he opened the batting with Stewie Dempster against Auckland, and was Wellington's top-scorer, with 71 and 12. He was instrumental in Rangitikei's only two successful challenges for the Hawke Cup: he scored 129 and 47 when Rangitikei beat Wairarapa in December 1921, and 12 and 160 (batting at number three) in the victory over Manawatu in March 1930.
