= Arthur Duncan (New Zealand cricketer) =

New Zealand cricketer (1860–1911)

Personal information
- Full name: Arthur Alexander Keith Duncan
- Born: 11 January 1860; Christchurch, New Zealand
- Died: 13 February 1911 (aged 51); Wellington, New Zealand
- Role: Bowler

Domestic team information
- Years: Team
- 1879/80: Wellington
- Source: Cricinfo, 24 October 2020

Arthur Alexander Keith Duncan (11 January 1860 – 13 February 1911) was a New Zealand civil servant and cricketer. He played in two first-class matches for Wellington during the 1879–80 season.

Duncan was born at Christchurch in 1860, the son of Alexander Duncan, one of the earliest European settlers of the Akaroa area who had arrived in New Zealand in 1859. He was educated at Christchurch Boys' High School and after leaving school worked for the Christchurch-based newspaper, The Press, before entering the civil service, working initially in Christchurch before transferring to the accountants department at the General Post Office in Wellington.

Whilst working at the GPO, Duncan made his only first-class cricket appearances, playing for Wellington in matches against West Coast and Nelson in December 1879. He scored a total of eight runs and took five wickets. Earlier in the season he had played another match for the representative team against Wanganui, bowling "exceedingly well" and taking six wickets in the first innings, including a hat trick. He was considered "well-known in cricket and yachting circles" in Wellington at the time, and played rugby for Wellington RFC.

In 1891 Duncan transferred to work as chief clerk in the Public Trust Office, working for the newly appointed Public Trustee JK Warburton. After three years he was appointed as Deputy Public Trustee, holding the position until his death. Duncan was a committee member at the Wellington Atheneum, was secretary of the Wellington Regatta Club, and was a prominent free mason in the city.

Duncan died suddenly from heart disease at his home in Wellington in 1911. He was unmarried and aged 51. (Note: Contemporary obituaries give Duncan's age as 53, although one notes his date of birth as 1860, making hi 51 at the time of his death.)
