= Rangitikei cricket team =

New Zealand cricket team

Personnel
- Owner: Rangitikei Cricket Association

Team information
- Founded: 1908
- Home ground: Marton Park, Marton

History
- Hawke Cup wins: 2

The Rangitikei cricket team represented the Rangitikei region (approximately the same as the current Rangitikei District) of New Zealand's North Island. It competed in the Hawke Cup from 1910–11 to 1988–89, winning the title twice. The Rangitikei Cricket Association continues to exist, but for inter-provincial purposes Rangitikei is now part of the Whanganui team. Rangitikei's headquarters were in Marton, where its main home ground was Marton Park at first, then Centennial Park, which was established after World War II.

Rangitikei was also the origin and administrative home of the wandering cricket team the New Zealand Nomads, which toured New Zealand in the summer months from 1907 to 1983.

== History ==
Cricket was played in Rangitikei at least as far back as 1864, when a Rangitikei team played a match against the Wanganui Cricket Club. A Manawatu Rangitikei Cricket Association was formed in 1893, but in 1895 Rangitikei separated, and the Manawatu Cricket Association was formed.

The Rangitikei Cricket Association was formed in 1908, but it did little until the inauguration of the Hawke Cup in the 1910–11 season, in which it decided to compete. Rangitikei's first Hawke Cup match was against Manawatu in January 1911, when Rangitikei won by one run. They beat South Taranaki in the next match by an innings, but then lost to Southland by eight wickets in the final in Christchurch. Southland thus became the first holders of the title. Rangitikei's captain, the Hunterville lawyer and former Auckland player James Hussey, was the tournament's leading wicket-taker, with 21 at an average of 17.04.

After World War I, Rangitikei made two successful challenges for the Hawke Cup. In December 1921, captained by John Broad, they defeated Wairarapa by seven wickets, Douglas Cameron scoring 129 and 47. In March 1930, captained by A. P. Smith, they defeated Manawatu by four runs, Cameron scoring 12 and 160. The match was decided on the fifth day. Rangitikei made 11 challenges between 1934 and 1972 but without success.

In 1950 Rangitikei was one of nine associations that formed the Central Districts cricket team, which began competing at first-class level in the Plunket Shield in 1950–51. Rangitikei's first player in the Central Districts team was Don Macleod, who scored a century on his debut for Central Districts in 1956–57. Rangitikei's first Test representative, however, was Tom Lowry, New Zealand's inaugural Test captain, who was representing Rangitikei when he led New Zealand on their first Test tour of England in 1931.

=== New Zealand Nomads ===
In 1907 the New Zealand Nomads were formed in Rangitikei by Henry Arkwright, a local farmer, who was born in England and educated at Winchester College before moving to New Zealand in 1901. Consisting "almost exclusively of English public school and New Zealand elite school old boys who were able to fund the tours privately", the New Zealand Nomads were a wandering amateur cricket team that toured New Zealand in the summer months from 1907 to 1983. Marton's location at the junction of major railway lines helped the Nomads' ability to travel around the country.

At first the Nomads were mostly from Rangitikei, but soon the team attracted like-minded members from around New Zealand. Their ability to attract well-known players enabled them to participate in benefit matches, such as one for the former New Zealand player Caleb Olliff in the 1913–14 season, when an Auckland newspaper described Rangitikei as "that hot-bed of cricket enthusiasm". The Nomads' leading player before the First World War was Hugh Butterworth of Wanganui. Other prominent cricketers who also had extensive careers with the Nomads include Arthur Ongley, Bill Bernau, David Collins and Kenneth Cave. Arkwright served as president of the Rangitikei Cricket Association for many years, and was appointed the association's inaugural patron when he stepped down in 1946.
