= George Orr (cricketer) =

New Zealand cricketer

Personal information
- Born: 26 July 1896; St Leonards, New South Wales, Australia
- Died: 2 October 1972 (aged 76); Wanganui, New Zealand
- Batting: Right-handed
- Role: Batsman

Domestic team information
- Years: Team
- 1923/24–1926/27: Wellington

Career statistics
Competition	First-class
Matches	3
Runs scored	187
Batting average	31.16
100s/50s	0/2
Top score	69
Catches/stumpings	1/–
- Source: CricketArchive, 8 October 2015

George Orr (26 July 1896 – 2 October 1972) was an Australian-born New Zealand first-class cricketer who played for Wellington in the 1920s.

== Biography ==
Born in the Sydney suburb of St Leonards on 20 July 1896, Orr played junior cricket in Australia before enlisting in the Australian 9th Flying Corps Engineers in 1916.

Following the war, he worked for Sydney solicitors Minter Simpson & Co. until 1922 when he accepted a role with the New Zealand Farmers' Co-operative Distributing Company in Wanganui, New Zealand. An opening batsman, Orr quickly gained local attention for his cricketing skill, being lauded for his "solid defence and an exquisite square cut", and after some high scores was selected for Wanganui for the Hawke Cup match against Rangitikei on 15 November 1922, making 72. He was soon selected in a Minor Associations side to play the touring MCC side, scoring one and eleven.

Despite the poor returns against the MCC, Orr was chosen for the Minor Associations side in a match against Wellington which served as a trial for Wellington's upcoming Plunket Shield match against Auckland. He made 27 and 44; enough to be included in the Wellington team for his first-class debut.

Orr made his debut on Christmas Day 1923 against Auckland at the Wellington College Ground, making 69 and 35 as Wellington won by 365 runs.

Orr's performance was rated highly by the media, with one newspaper reporter stating, "He is a finished batsman, with a wide range of good scoring strokes. He gave the impression that he could score fast if he were to take the brake off but in each innings ... he played for the side rather than himself."

Orr was retained for Wellington's next match, against Canterbury at Basin Reserve, scoring nine and zero.

At the time Wellington's sole selector Kinder Tucker did not travel outside Wellington to watch regional matches and was notoriously reluctant to select country players, so players were selected on their performances in Wellington. Orr continued to score heavily for Wanganui, including 124 against Auckland in January 1924 but failures in matches played in front of Tucker meant Orr did not return to first-class cricket until Wellington's 7 January 1927 match against Auckland.

Orr scored 68 in the first innings and was run out for six in the second but was never again selected for Wellington. He continued to play for Wanganui, including a match against the touring 1927–28 Australian team, where he top scored with 24 out of 83 as former Wellington cricketer Clarrie Grimmett took 8 for 30 for the tourists.

Orr continued to appear for Wanganui sporadically until his retirement from cricket in 1934, having scored 1412 runs for Wanganui at 27.60. While his first-class career was brief, Orr's career with Wanganui was highly regarded. The cricket historian T.W. Reese, in his book New Zealand Cricket, stated that the resurgence of cricket in Wanganui post-war could be attributed to Orr who "not only proved himself a very sound batsman but seemed by his success to inspire the others."

Following his retirement, Orr was a long serving Wanganui delegate to the Wellington Cricket Association and became a respected figure in the Wellington media for his views on cricket.

Orr served in the Pacific conflict during World War II as a lieutenant in the New Zealand Expeditionary Force before returning to Wanganui where he served as Chairman of Directors of the Wanganui Traders' Association, Secretary of the Wanganui Grain and Seed Merchants' Association and Chairman of Directors, Amalgamated Grain Distributors Association, Wellington.

Orr, who never married, died in Wanganui on 2 October 1972, aged 76.

== Sources ==
- Whitehorn, Zane, "George Orr", The Cricket Statistician, Autumn 2004, No. 127. The Association of Cricket Statisticians and Historians: Nottingham.
