= Colin McVicar =

New Zealand cricketer

Personal information
- Full name: Colin Cameron McVicar
- Born: 3 June 1916; Palmerston North, New Zealand
- Died: 17 February 1987 (aged 70); Palmerston North
- Batting: Right-handed
- Bowling: Slow left-arm orthodox
- Relatives: Stuart McVicar (brother)

Domestic team information
- Years: Team
- 1950/51–1951/52: Central Districts

Career statistics
Competition	First-class
Matches	5
Runs scored	182
Batting average	20.22
100s/50s	0/0
Top score	42
Balls bowled	6
Wickets	0
Bowling average	–
5 wickets in innings	–
10 wickets in match	–
Best bowling	–
Catches/stumpings	12/–
- Source: Cricinfo, 10 December 2017

Colin Cameron McVicar (3 June 1916 – 17 February 1987) was a New Zealand cricketer who played five matches of first-class cricket for Central Districts between January 1951 and January 1952.

McVicar was born in Palmerston North, and attended Palmerston North Boys' High School. He served with the New Zealand Army in World War II and was taken prisoner during the Battle of El Alamein in North Africa in 1942. He was held in prison camps in Italy before being transferred to a German camp near Potsdam, where he remained until the camp was liberated in early 1945.

An opening batsman, McVicar made his first-class debut at the age of 34 in Central Districts' second match in the 1950–51 season. It was also Central Districts' debut season, and they had lost their first match, but this time, playing for the first time at home, they won, defeating Canterbury at Fitzherbert Park in Palmerston North. In a low-scoring match McVicar top-scored in the first innings with 42 and took three catches in Canterbury's first innings. Central Districts also won their next match, another low-scoring match, McVicar making 29 and 40. In subsequent matches he was less successful with the bat, and lost his spot after the first two matches of the 1951–52 season.

Before his first-class debut, McVicar had already had a long and successful career for Manawatu in the Hawke Cup during Manawatu's period of dominance from 1934–35 to 1946–47. He was the competition's leading run-scorer in 1937–38, 1945–46 and 1946–47, and had established the record for the most runs in Hawke Cup challenge matches, finishing his career with 1,754 runs at an average of 40.79. His record stood until Ian Leggat broke it during the 1964–65 season.

McVicar's brother Stuart also played first-class cricket, representing Wellington, and their father Alec was a stalwart for Manawatu for more than 20 years. The Colin McVicar Trust supported the Manawatu Cricket Association until 2008, when the trust's money was transferred to the Manawatu Cricket Investment Fund. The practice facilities at Fitzherbert Park are named after the McVicar family.
