= Christopher Cross (cricketer) =

New Zealand cricketer

Personal information
- Full name: Christopher Smith Cross
- Born: 26 October 1852; Nelson, New Zealand
- Died: 26 June 1919 (aged 66); Mosman, Sydney, Australia
- Bowling: Fast-medium
- Role: All-rounder, occasional wicket-keeper

Domestic team information
- Years: Team
- 1873/74–1888/89: Nelson
- 1879/80: West Coast
- 1884/85–1895/96: Wellington

Career statistics
Competition	First-class
Matches	22
Runs scored	538
Batting average	14.54
100s/50s	0/2
Top score	67
Balls bowled	733
Wickets	20
Bowling average	9.45
5 wickets in innings	0
10 wickets in match	0
Best bowling	4/10
Catches/stumpings	11/2
- Source: Cricinfo, 13 December 2017

Christopher Smith Cross (26 October 1852 – 26 June 1919) was a New Zealand cricketer and businessman who played first-class cricket in New Zealand from 1874 to 1895.

Cross was born in Nelson, where his father, James Smith Cross, was the harbourmaster. He married Anne Green in Nelson in May 1876.

Cross was a hard-hitting batsman, a fast-medium bowler, a fine fieldsman and sometimes wicket-keeper. He made his highest first-class score for Wellington when they defeated Otago in 1892–93; he scored 67, easily the highest score of the match, an innings of "sterling cricket, comprising excellent cutting and driving". He captained the Wanganui team that inflicted the only defeat on the touring Australians in 1880-81. In 1882, while batting at the St John's ground in Wanganui, Cross hit a ball that travelled 156 yards before it landed. This hit was still a New Zealand record in the late 1950s, and may still be.

Cross worked as a financial agent and merchant in Wanganui. Later he moved to Australia, where he had a business in Sydney as a coal exporter and shipping agent. He died in Sydney after a long illness, leaving a widow, three sons and two daughters.
