= William Collins (New Zealand surgeon) =

New Zealand sportsman and politician

The Honourable William Collins
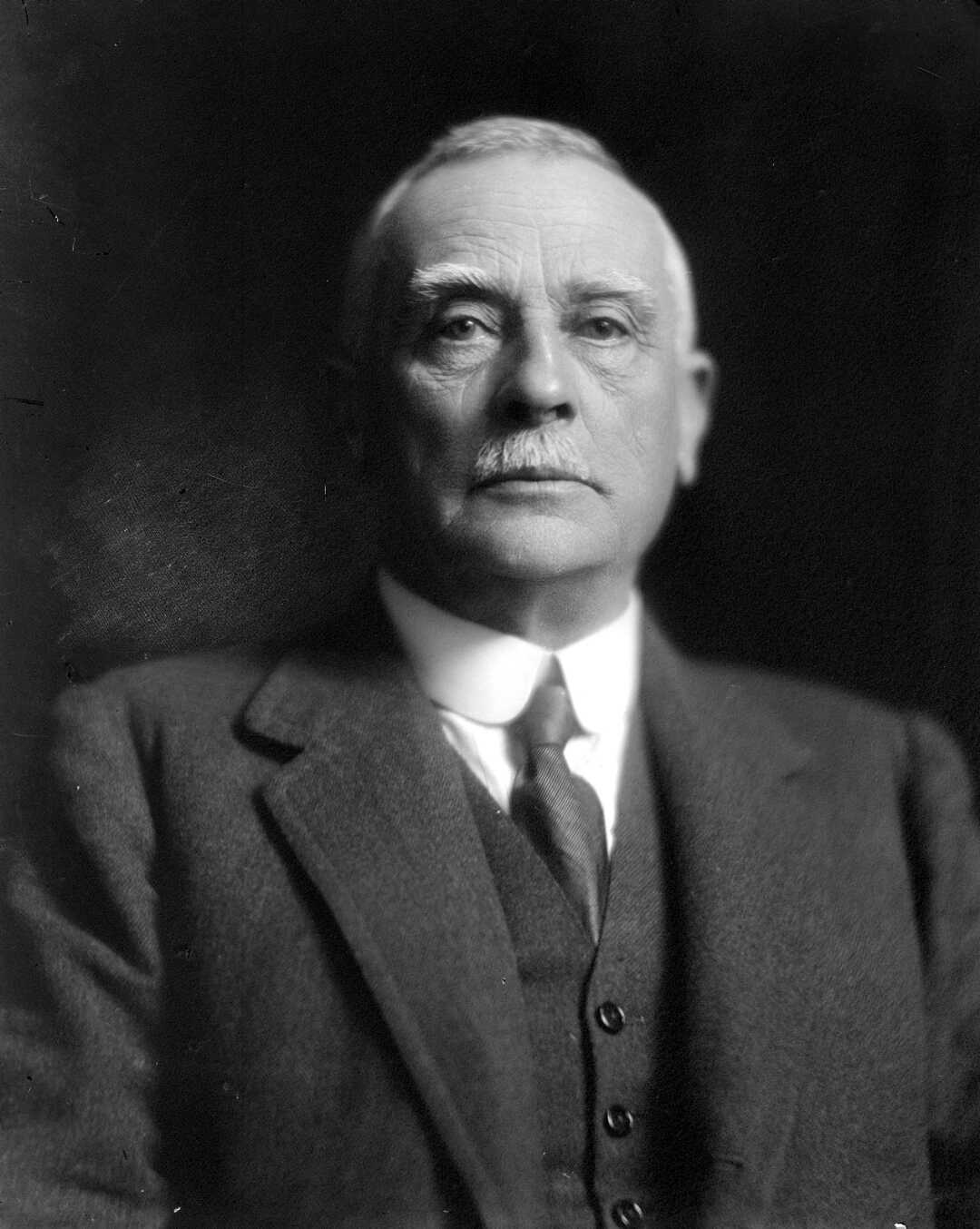
- Collins in 1920

Member of the New Zealand Legislative Council
- In office 22 January 1907 – 11 August 1934

Personal details
- Born: William Edward Collins; 14 October 1853 Darjeeling, India
- Died: 11 August 1934 (aged 80) Wellington, New Zealand
- Resting place: Karori Cemetery
- Spouse: Isabella Georgiana Warren (m. 1886)
- Children: David Collins

William Edward Collins CMG (14 October 1853 – 11 August 1934) was a New Zealand medical doctor, sportsman and politician. He was a member of the New Zealand Legislative Council from 1907 until his death.

Collins was born in Darjeeling, India. His father was John Charles Collins MD and his mother was Ann (née Bury). He received his education at Cheltenham College in England and at the University of London. He was then at St George's Hospital in London, from where he qualified with FRCS in 1876 and a Bachelor of Medicine in 1877.

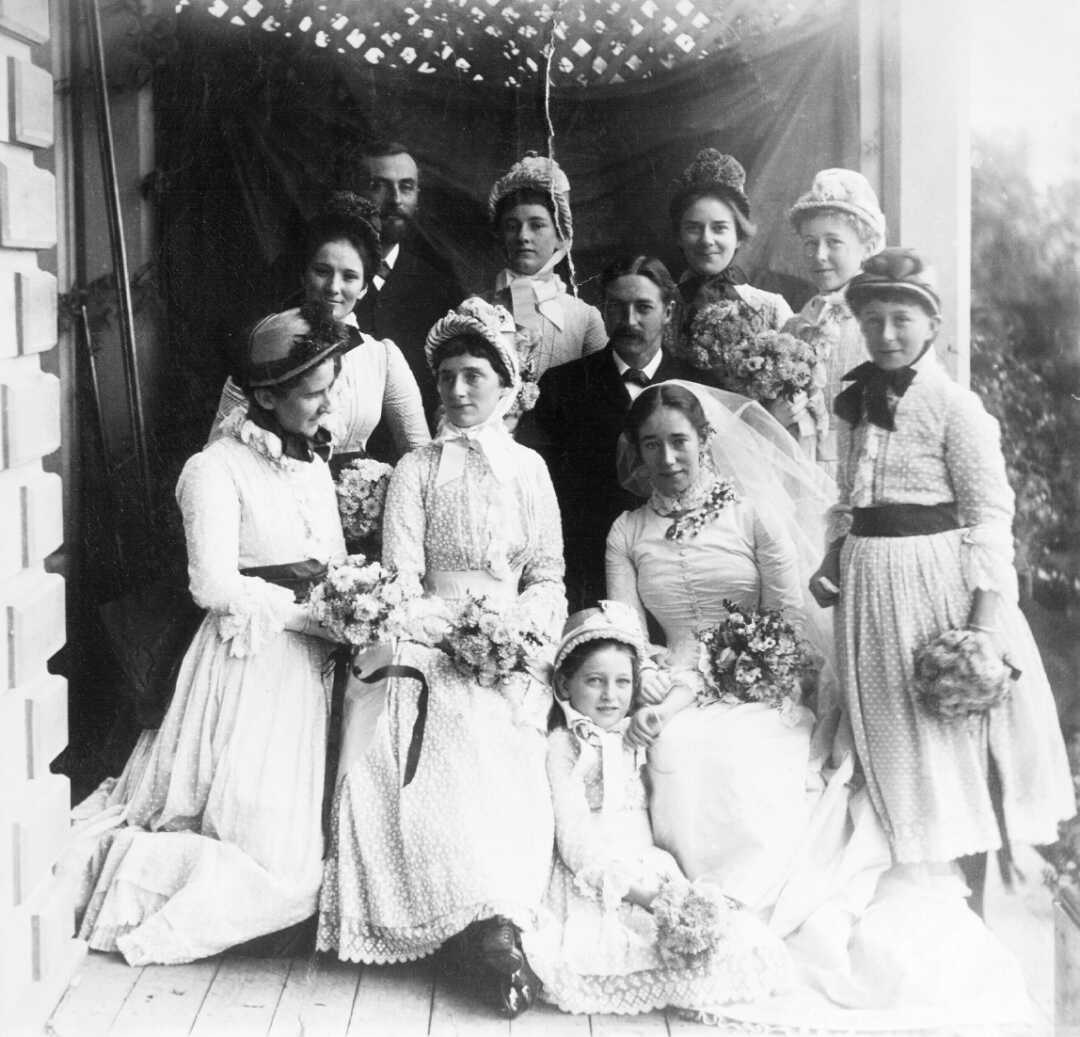
Collins (rear left) was groomsman for his business partner, Dr Walter Fell, at his wedding in 1886

His greatest sporting accomplishments were in rugby union; he represented England as a half-back several times in the 1870s, before emigrating to New Zealand. He first arrived in Nelson in April 1877 but by October 1878, he put his land and house up for auction and moved to Wellington.

Collins played two games of first-class cricket for Wellington in the 1880s. Previously he had played for Cheltenham College, and had played against teams captained by W. G. Grace. A. E. J. Collins was his nephew, while his son David Collins played more than 50 first-class matches and his brother John Collins six.

Away from sport, Collins was a notable medical doctor and surgeon in Wellington, having studied at the University of London. In 1884, he was joined by Walter Fell MD in his practice in Wellington. Later, he shared his practice—which was located in Boulcott Street—with Walter Hislop (son of Thomas William Hislop). In WWI he was a Colonel in the New Zealand Medical Corps (NZMC). While on the New Zealand Hospital Ship Maheno in 1915 then serving in the Mediterranean he "raised hackles by denying nurses their officer status and deluding himself that he could command the ship's commander, the master" (Captain McLean). He was appointed Companion of the Order of St Michael and St George in the 1917 New Year Honours.

Collins married on 4 November 1886 at St Paul's Cathedral, Dunedin. It was a double wedding with two sisters of the surname Warren who were granddaughters of the Hon. Matthew Holmes. Collins married Isabella. Arthur Edward Pearce, a son of Col. Edward Pearce, married Annie Vida Kate.

Collins was appointed as a member of the New Zealand Legislative Council (the upper house) from 1907 until he died in Wellington; his membership was renewed in 1914, 1921 and 1928. He died on 11 August 1934 at his home in Wellington's Hobson Street. His funeral service was held at St Paul's Pro-Cathedral followed by cremation at the Karori Cemetery.
