= Arthur Duncan (disambiguation) =

Arthur Duncan (1925–2023) was an American tap dancer.

Arthur Duncan may also refer to:

- Art Duncan (1891–1975), Canadian ice hockey player, coach, and general manager, and World War I fighter ace
- Arthur Duncan (English cricketer) (1856–1936), English cricketer
- Arthur Duncan (New Zealand cricketer) (1860–1911), New Zealand cricketer
- Arthur Duncan (Australian footballer) (1913–1991), Australian rules footballer
- Arthur Duncan (footballer, born 1947), Scottish footballer
- Arthur Duncan (golfer) (1875–1951), New Zealand golfer and businessman
- Little Arthur Duncan (1934–2008), American blues harmonica player
