= Grand Annual =

Australian Thoroughbred steeplechase for horses

The Grand Annual is an Australian Thoroughbred steeplechase for horses that run at Warrnambool, Victoria during its annual May Racing Carnival. The distance is officially listed as about 5500 metres because many sections of the race are run in open paddocks with little or no fences. The race is the longest horse race run in Australia on a public course. There are 33 obstacles, more than any other steeplechase in the world.

Horse run clockwise and counter-clockwise at various points of the race and features a section in open paddocks, these paddocks were bought by the Warrnambool Racing Club in the 1800s. When re-entering the racetrack itself horses turn left on the first lap and right on the second. This has created problems on many occasions when horses have tried to veer left rather than right second time around.

Knowledge of the course and stamina are vital to the chances of horse and rider. With the Great Eastern Steeplechase and VRC Grand National it is considered to be one of the top three Australian steeplechase races.

== History ==
=== 1800s ===
The Grand Annual was first run on Thursday 13 June 1872. Francis Tozer, Henry Phillips, Samuel Macgregor, Anthony Mackenzie and John Russell Evans were appointed as stewards and laid out a unique steeplechase course over the paddocks adjacent to the racecourse. The first two of fourteen fences, opposite the grandstand, were a post and rail fence and a paling fence. Next was the three-railed fence enclosing the racecourse reserve and then a post and rail fence into what is now Brierly paddock. There were four paddocks at the time, so an obstacle was installed at each boundary – a log fence into the second paddock, then a post and railer, and a log fence into the fourth paddock. Next came a post and railer and a log fence either side of the road at the top of Cox's hill. The stewards upped the ante over the racecourse lane now Tozer Road - first a rough stone wall and then a difficult log fence. Back in the racecourse reserve, there was a ditch and parapet fence and a couple more post and railers before the horses embarked on the second lap. When the new course was laid out some of the professional jockeys protested that it was too dangerous. To show that it was not Tozer entered his mare Compass for the first race over the course, the Maiden Steeplechase, who was ridden by Sam Robinson, an Aboriginal. They flew every fence and wall with ease, quickly settling the grumblings from the other riders.

Prior started favourite in the inaugural race. Prior's jockey William Harden predicted that Prior would be the only horse to finish, but in fact nine of the eleven runners finished the race. Prior won by 20 lengths. The Warrnambool Racing Club was officially constituted one week after the 1873 meeting and it has staged every Grand Annual since then. In 1875 the meeting was expanded to two days, with four races on each day. WRC reduced the meeting to one day in 1877 but went back to two days in 1878 and more than doubled the stake for big steeplechase, extended the distance to four miles, and renamed it the Grand National Steeplechase. Greystanes won the 1878 and 1880 renewals, taking more than eleven minutes on wet ground in both years. The changes to the race were short-lived, due to bad weather in a couple of years, the introduction of the VRC Grand Nationals, and financial pressures of conducting two feature meetings and of the construction of a new grandstand (still in use as subsequently extended).

In 1880 the club effectively merged the Steeplechase Meeting and the Annual Races, at which the first Warrnambool Cup was run in 1873. With the Warrnambool Amateur Turf Club racing on the middle of three days this was the start of the modern May Carnival. Dan Coleman with 7 wins has the most wins as a jockey leading Tom Corrigan, Alf Williams, ‘Butch’ Londregan, Brett Scott and Craig Durden with 4 wins.

WRC purchased 20 acres of ‘Brierly’ before the scheduled auction on 18 November 1890. The price was £1,400, at a time when the Grand Annual carried a stake of only £175. The WRC still did not own the land between the top of Cox's Hill and Tozer Road and which was owned by James Granter. Negotiations with Granter for the continued use of his paddock dragged on until, extraordinarily, at a committee meeting on 14 April 1896 Walter Manifold, annoyed by Granter's stance, proposed that the club run the Annual on the old inside steeplechase course around the outside of the course proper. The committee debated an amended motion that the club use the paddocks one last time and give Granter six months’ notice of its intention not to do so in the future. This amended motion was only carried on the casting vote of the chairman, Henry Parrington. The committee resolved in September 1897 that the club dispense with any further use of Granter's land after the expiry of the existing arrangement on 31 December 1897. Granter did agree to one-year deals in 1898 and 1899. Finally in August 1899 a final offer of £800 to James Granter was offered for his paddock which he accepted.

The race was known as the Warrnambool Handicap Steeple until 1877, the Grand National Steeple from 1878 until 1881, the Warrnambool Handicap Steeple again until 1894, and the Grand Annual Steeple since 1895. The popularity of the Victoria's biggest provincial race meeting was irrevocably established. It was estimated the attendance on Grand Annual day in 1888 at nearly 10,000 and in 1891 at 12,000, at a time when Warrnambool had a population of only about 6,000 people.

=== Early 1900s ===
Dan Coleman has the most wins as a jockey with seven Grand Annuals in the space of only 13 runnings: Butler (1900), Ranji (1903), Wooral (1904), Napier (1906, 1907), Alcuin (1910) and Tramp (1912). Following the 1903 Steeplechase Meeting, the course proper was now left-handed and thus bringing it into line with almost all other Victorian courses. The steeplechase course had a third fence opposite the grandstand added to it. Steeplechases continued to be run entirely in a clockwise direction. Only three horses finished the 1909 race ran in atrocious conditions won by Mossbank by five lengths.

During the 1920s there were three controversial runnings of the race. The first was in 1920 were an aeroplane followed the runners and was responsible of five of the seven horse field falling. The second was in 1922 St. Simonian and Orison jumped the last together with the former winning by a neck but in the bumping duel up the straight he hung out badly, with both horses finishing near the outside rail. A protest was lodge and upheld meaning Orison was the winner. The third was in 1929 Agricolo and Cooliel, jumped the last fence together; with Pick Me third. Pick Me surged home and finished two lengths in front of Cooliel. It was immediately suggested that Pick Me had not jumped the second last fence. A protest was lodged alleging that Pick Me had run around the second last fence. The stewards concluded that Pick Me ran around the end of the wing of the fence, and continued in the race. Pick Me's rider Jack Smith insisted that the horse had negotiated the fence near the junction of the wing, but the stewards would have none of that. They disqualified Pick Me and awarded the race to Cooliel. Also in the 1920s saw the champion Doiran win a Grand Annual. He made his first and only appearance here in 1923, by which time he had won Great Eastern Steeplechase in 1918, 1919, 1922 and 1923. The record stake of £1,000 for the 1923 Annual attracted a strong field of 12 runners - including previous winners Tenarqui, Cotswold and Orison, although not one of them completed the course. In front of a huge crowd in warm weather under a cloudless sky Doiran took charge approaching the Cox's hill double on the second lap and won easily, cutting 7.5 seconds off the then record time.

The 1934 renewal was one of the most sensational in the Annual's history. Diamond Plume ran off early and Merry Eye stopped at the first of the Tozer Road Double. Lanilda fell at the second of the stand treble. Royal Artist had set a fast pace and was leading by about 20 lengths passing the stand the second time; but he fell at the first of the Alfred Road double. As the field entered Brierly for the second time only Giff, Flavedo and Wang-ka-Pang were still standing. At the first fence in Brierly Giff fell and Flavedo ran off. Wang-ka-Pang only had to stay on his feet to win, but he fell at the next fence. No horses were left in the race. Jockey Ron Sweetnam got Flavedo going again and Alex Fullarton remounted the other equal favourite, Lanilda. Flavedo fell at the sod wall at the bottom of Granter's paddock. Sweetnam was dazed, severely shaken, had abrasions to his face and injured a wrist which had been broken recently. However, some bystanders helped him back into the saddle and eventually got the bit back into Flavedo's mouth. Sweetnam got Flavedo home by 12 lengths from Lanilda, which had also fallen again. Sweetnam almost collapsed after dismounting but was able to weigh in correctly. Merry Eye ultimately got around the course and took third place, nearly a mile behind Lanilda. The time of 8:55 was the slowest since 1909 and was about a minute and a half slower than the course record set by Peter's Pence in 1930. In January 1936 the Warrnambool Steeplechase course began converting from solid fences to brush fences. Why Fail was the last horse to win the Annual over the old fences. No race meetings were held at Warrnambool for approximately two and a half years after the 1941 Steeplechase Meeting and the carnival would not resume until 1947.

=== Mid 1900s ===
In 1947 the May Warrnambool Carnival returned. Quixotic won the 1947 race. For seven successive years from 1947 to 1953 the gate takings on Grand Annual day set a new record. The field for the 1948 Annual included the previous three winners of the VRC Grand National Steeplechase: Quixotic, High Flash and Formidable, along with Tente which would go on to win the National a couple of months later. High Flash won and completed the Brierly-Grand Annual double. In the aftermath of the carnival the achievements of High Flash were overshadowed by the death of a young jockey. Charles Henry Jarman rode Kindervale into second place in the Brierly. Kindervale led over the Tozer Road Double on the second lap but, tiring badly and fell at the second last fence, and threw Jarman heavily to the ground. Jarman made a desperate attempt to vault back into the saddle, but Kindervale went down and one of the horse's hoofs struck Jarman behind his left ear. Jarman appeared to simply have mild concussion. After the race he sat in the jockey's room with his head in his hands complaining about a splitting headache. He was taken to hospital so that he could be kept under observation for 24 hours, but later in the evening developed signs of internal hemorrhage and an operation was performed at 2:00 am. Tragically, Jarman did not respond and he died on the morning of Saturday 8 May 1948. Jarman's death was the sixth on the Warrnambool course following those of Jack Hickey (Junior Steeplechase, April 1887), Jimmy Williams (Hurdle Race, February 1900), Adrian Bettess (Hopkins Hurdle, May 1914), Gerald Kenny (Grand Annual, May 1928) and Arthur Newnham (Lady Bay Hurdle, January 1947). In 1952 two scratchings reduced the Grand Annual field to three, the second smallest ever behind the pair of runners in 1882. The race's prize money was doubling to £2,000 in 1953. This attracted 16 starters, the equal largest field ever, shared with 1949. Prior to the 1952 Summer Meeting the winning post was moved half a furlong down the straight, to around its present location.

Trainer Kevin Lafferty from the 1956 Annual which his horse Mac Union won until January 1958 won seven of the nine steeplechases conducted by the Warrnambool Racing Club, including two Grand Annuals, and trained the runner-up in the other two races. Lafferty finished with the top three in the 1957 Brierly Steeplechase, with Franstone defeating his stablemates Ashburton and Solight. Lafferty scratched Franstone from the Annual and watched Solight and Ashburton fight out a thrilling finish to the race, with Solight under Jockey J.N. Williams the victor. It took a record winning time to deprive Kevin Lafferty of three successive wins in the race. McKenna scored an easy 15 length win in the 1958 Brierly in record time and two days later clipped four seconds off the best time for the Annual in a stirring win over Solight. By the early 1960s racing was undergoing significant changes following the introduction of the TAB. The VRC considered it desirable to limit the number of racing clubs in Victoria. This would play a role in the Warrnambool Amateur Turf Club merging with the Warrnambool Racing Club. The amateurs raced as part of the May Carnival for the last time in 1962, after which the VRC forced them to race on a Saturday. They held their final meeting on Saturday 28 December 1963, a little over 104 years after their first meeting in 1859. The amateurs had raced on the middle day of the carnival for many decades. The last link to the amateur era at the carnival was severed in 1973 when the Lindsay Restricted Steeple replaced the Lindsay Hunt Steeple on the middle day of the three day carnival.

Prior to the 1952 Summer Meeting the winning post was moved about half a furlong (100 metres) down the straight from in front of the public grandstand to around its present location. Scottish born Tom McGinley was having only his second ride over Warrnambool on the 9-4 favourite Falsetto in the 1966 Brierly Steeplechase. It could hardly be expected that McGinley would read the general information inside the front cover of the racebook, part of which stated: STEEPLECHASES – Patrons are reminded that the steeplechase finish is opposite the Public Stand. Instead of hearing the cheers of the crowd as he approached that winning post with a lead of about 12 lengths, McGinley's ears rang with the sound of whips cracking behind him and he suddenly realised he had mistaken the position of the steeplechase finish. Neville Rantall and Regalo, the 1965 Brierly champions, hit the line on the outside of Falsetto. Falsetto appeared to have won by almost half a length to the good of Regalo on the line, However the judge, Roy Stokesberry who did not have the benefit of a photo awarded the race to Regalo by a head. To add insult to injury the stewards, who did not follow their usual practice of reminding jockeys prior to the Brierly of the position of the winning post, fined McGinley $200 for careless riding in mistaking the position of the winning post and easing Falsetto down. Two days later the equal favourite Goldfish in the Grand Annual was beaten by a head and the protest against the winner, Hoadsville, was dismissed. The Falsetto affair led to changes to have steeplechases finish in the same place as flat and hurdle races. VRC senior steward and former trainer Jack Walsh, who won the Grand Annual from 1951 to 1955, devised a plan to achieve this. On the second circuit in the Grand Annual and in all steeplechases over one circuit, horses would now turn right rather than left after jumping the Tozer Road double. Two new fences were erected in the lane adjacent to the back straight together with a fence near the first fence of the Alfred Road double. Horses then raced to the right of a small section of railing, joined the home straight and jumped a new moveable fence at the 200 metre mark. The changes meant that there were 19 rather than 18 fences in races over “about two miles” and 33 fences rather than 32 in the Annual, and meant that the ‘Mantrap’, the first fence to the left of the Tozer Road Double, would be jumped only once a year.

The new jumps were used for the first time when four horses, commencing with Whitby ridden by Neville Rantall, schooled over the course on Friday 1 May 1970. However, they were not used during the carnival as the stewards inspected the new section of the steeplechase course during Tuesday's race meeting and decided that due to the sodden state of the course the Brierly would be run over the old course. Whitby's schooling efforts ultimately paid dividends as after finishing second in the last Brierly over the old course he won the 1971 renewal over the new course. At the 1970 carnival the Lindsay Hunt Steeplechase and the Grand Annual were also run over the old course. The Warrnambool specialist Paston won the last Grand Annual run in an entirely clockwise direction. The first steeplechase over the new course was the December Steeple in 1970. Beau Dallo, ridden by Kelvin Bourke for Flemington trainer Bob Winks, won that race. As the 1971 Grand Annual was washed out, the new course was not used for the Annual until 1972. Some horses did not handle the changes to the steeplechase course including Gypsy Grey. In the 1975 Grand Annual, Russell, which would go on to become the only three-time winner of the Brierly Steeplechase, led down the hill the second time with Gypsy Grey in fourth place. Rantall cut the corner back into the course proper on Russell perfectly, but Gypsy Grey ran wide and lost at least eight lengths and appeared to have lost any winning chance. However, he stormed home to defeat Dark Honey by four lengths, with a tiring Russell in third place.

=== Late 1900s ===
The Century Grand Annual was run in 1977. That race ended in a boilover as a 7/4 Favourite Double Choke was beaten by Count Cobbler at 20/1 the longest price winner in the race's history. In 1978 So And So easily won the 1978 Brierly Steeplechase, with WRC members watching from the new grandstand that had been constructed at a cost of $300,000 and opened at a race meeting in November 1977. A So and So victory was never in doubt after rider Kelvin Bourke, took the 5-4 favourite to the lead over the stand treble on the second lap. Jim Houlahan had won the Grand Annual for the first time. In 1979 the race had a sponsor's name for the first time, the Warrnambool Woollen Mill Grand Annual Steeplechase. Jim Houlahan described the 1979 race as “the best steeplechase I have ever seen.” In an exciting finish any of three horses looked like winning over the final 200 metres. History was made with the first three horses home trained by females. Rhoda Handyside's Thackeray at 14-1 flew home after being well back for most of the race, Follow The Band finished in second place for, Coolgardie finished third. In 1980 Thackeray raced much closer to the lead and won the Annual again. The Annual was again won by a female trainer in 1982 when leading jumps handler Kath Smith trained Meander Son to win the Brierly-Grand Annual double. It was a female horse that dominated the 1983 renewal, with Venite completing the Great Eastern-Grand Annual double.

The 1984 race was won by Rockey Affiar but is best remembered for Galleywood's fall at the last fence who led early but tired late before falling. The screen went up, course broadcaster Bill Collins foreshadowed the worst as the local hero lay motionless on the track. After what seemed like an eternity Galleywood rose to his feet. There were Rousing cheers for both Galleywood and Rocky Affair. Galleywood finished second in the 1985 Von Doussa Steeplechase at Oakbank before finishing eighth in the Brierly and had to be scratched from the Annual due to a virus. In 1986 Galleywood was third in the Von Doussa and second in the Great Eastern before winning in the Brierly. In 1986 race Galleywood led the field over the Tozer Road Double the second time and looked to be full of running. The large crowd held its breath as Galleywood approached the last fence which he jumped. Commentar Bryan Martin hailed him as “Lazarus – back from the dead” and “Go go Galleywood.” Bruce McAvaney declared "Warrnambool goes wild as Galleywood wins" The following year Galleywood unseted the rider at the last in the Briley Steeplechase before finishing second behind Spring Fortune the 5-4 favourite slashed 3.2 seconds off So And So's course record. Durnore won for the locals in 1989 he fell in 1990 and placed in 1992 and 1993. The 1992 race was won by Vinchiamo the Great Eastern Steeplechase winner who two months later Vinchiarmo appeared to have won the VRC Grand National Steeplechase which would make him the first horse to win all three major steeplechases in one season. But trainer John Leek was disqualified for 12 months following an exhaustive investigation by stewards into the ownership of Vinchiamo and other horses that Leek trained. Vinchiamo lost the win never raced again.

After Commission Red was distanced in the 1989 Annual his owner, Barbara Garner, rang Houlahan and asked him to train the gelding. Houlahan was reluctant, having just watched Commission Red's poor showing. Garner persisted, believing that Houlahan could turn the horse around. Houlahan relented and did not charge training fees. Commission Red went on to win two Grand Annuals and stakes of $140,000. In 1998 the Warrnambool Racing Club struck the Jim Houlahan medal, which is now awarded to the leading jumps personality at the carnival. Following Houlahan's death in early 2007 the club renamed the stand treble the “Jim Houlahan treble.” In 2004 Houlahan was awarded an Order of Australia Medal for service to the horse racing industry and the community. In the same year he was inducted into the Australian Racing Hall of Fame. In 2006 Racing Victoria honoured Houlahan by launching the J.J. Houlahan Jumps Championship. It celebrates the horse, trainer and jockey who accumulate the most points in premier jumping races. Houlahan retired from training in 2005 and died in 2007 at 93.

The 1993 race was won by Straight And True and was part owned by John Weller. For 1994, 1995 and 1996 Weller trained the race's favourite all ridden by jockey Breet Scott. In 1994 Scott after finishing second on the Great Eastern winner Tyrolia stepped off the scales after weighing in and told the chairman of stewards, Pat Lalor, that he was protesting against the winner Chantry Rise for interference over the last 100 metres. To Scott's astonishment, Lalor told him that under VRC rules he could not protest after stepping off the scales. Lalor considered that the protest would not have been upheld and to reinforce the point added that the stewards would have lodged a protest on behalf of Tyrolia if they had considered that there were sufficient grounds. In the 1995 Annual the Great Eastern winner Light Hand looked a great winning chance when he led the field over Tozer Road on the second lap. However, he ran to the left and then slipped a couple of times as Scott tried to steer him to the right, finally dislodging Scott from the saddle. Hoki ended up winning the race. The race record is held was set by Hoki in 1996 at 6min 38.4 sec. The 1996 Brierly with Famous Way and Denali. In the Annual, Denali clipped the top of the third fence of the stand treble on the second lap and tipped Brett Scott off. However, Wheeler was getting closer winning the Annual as a trainer, as Famous Way finished a gallant second to Hoki. Finally in 1997 Foxboy, which had recently won the von Doussa Steeplechase and given Wheeler his fifth successive Great Eastern victory, easily won the 1997 Brierly and then as 8-11 favourite lead all the way to win by 20 lengths. Scott won the Annual again for Wheeler in 1998 with The Sundance Kid, in 2005 with Frankoo Very Much, and in 2006 with Real Tonic. The Warrnambool track was ripped up immediately after the 1998 carnival and underwent its first reconstruction since 1904, at a cost of $2.25 million. Largely due to the camber of the new track the first fence of the Alfred Road double was moved back about 80 metres and the stand treble was also altered.

=== 2000s ===
Jumps racing endured major challenges in the early 2000s. The racing industry had continued to strive to improve safety in jumps racing, particularly following reviews in 2002 and 2005, but not all of the new initiatives had the desired effect. From August 2003 Racing Victoria progressively introduced standard transportable modular hurdles featuring foam padded take-offs and soft yellow synthetic brush as well as introducing standard portable steeplechase fences, consisting of a solid base with flexible soft synthetic brush on top. The new obstacles gained many critics, with a growing tide of opinion that the jumps were too small and too forgiving, meaning horses did not respect them. Matters came to a head in the disastrous 2008 Grand National Hurdle at Flemington, which was run at breakneck speed on a firm track. The following Saturday the Aaron Purcell trained Ginolad won the Grand National Steeplechase, the last jumping race contested at Flemington.

Racing Victoria promptly engaged retired County Court judge David Jones to conduct an extensive review of jumps racing. Jones completed his review in November 2008. He recommended that jumps racing continue but that a range of changes be introduced including the establishment of a Jumps Review Panel, that no jumps races or trials be conducted on a track rated better than a Good 4, minimum weights be raised to 64 kg, stricter trialing conditions, additional education and training requirements for trainers and jockeys, and that a rider be required by the rules to retire a horse from a race where it was not in contention and was fatigued or distressed. The essential recommendations of the Jones report were adopted and announced on 4 December 2008 that jumps racing would continue. It programmed 93 jumping races in 2009, down 29 on the previous season.

Following several fatalities early in the 2009 jumps season including when a fatigued Clearview Bay crashed at the fourth-last fence in the Grand Annual, but prior to the presentations for the 2009 Grand Annual Racing Victoria CEO Rob Hines called an impromptu media briefing in the mounting yard and announced that Racing Victoria had decided to suspend jumps racing and arrange an urgent review. Word traveled fast on a racecourse and during the Grand Annual presentations winning trainer Robbie Laing declared, “Long live jumps racing”. Upon hearing the news while enjoying a beer near the Buxton bar four-time Grand Annual winning jockey Butch Londregan said he would scratch his horse, Infusion, from the final event as it was being prepared for hurdle races and if there were no such races there was no point in running the horse. Londregan saddled Infusion and then in a very public protest unsaddled the horse when it arrived in the mounting yard. Chairman of stewards Mark Hill told Londregan that there was no basis on which Infusion could be scratched and instructed him to re-saddle the horse. After a heated discussion Londregan complied. The suspension of jumps racing immediately after the 2009 Grand Annual overshadowed Robbie Laing's incredible achievement in winning the race with Sir Pentire, which had not raced for 104 weeks. The gelding had the benefit of 12 trials, five on the flat, two over hurdles and five over fences. The win was an emotional one for 33-year-old jockey Bill Williams, who had twice finished second in the Annual and suffered serious injuries in a fall from Poker Face at the last fence in the 2008 renewal. Williams endured three operations, 400 hours of physiotherapy and seven months out of the saddle. Racing Victoria announced on May 18 that it would lift the suspension of jumps racing.

The board announced certain safety initiatives but declined to guarantee that jumps racing would continue after the conclusion of the 2009 jumps season, stating that it intended to follow the Jones review recommendation of a full review at the end of the season. The Racing Victoria board decided on 27 November 2009 that jumps racing in Victoria would end after the 2010 jumps season, with a program of highweight races to be scheduled in 2011 to help jumps jockeys, trainers and horses go through the transition. Country Racing Victoria, the Australian Jumps Racing Association, and others in the racing industry attacked the decision. Vice chairman of the Melbourne Racing Club Mike Symons, a passionate supporter of jumps racing, made a submission to the Racing Victoria board on 19 January 2010 which contained a number of initiatives, including the need for changes to the obstacles. Following further discussions between Racing Victoria and Symons a set of key performance indicators were drawn up. It was announced on 21 January 2010 that if the key performance indicators were met jumps racing could continue beyond 2010. New hurdles were introduced, which included synthetic brush from France. The steeplechase fences were also modified. No jumping races were programmed at Moonee Valley, and the VRC decided that it would no longer stage such races. The 2010 Grand Nationals were conducted by the Melbourne Racing Club at Sandown, and the Grand National Steeplechase subsequently moved to Ballarat. The targets were achieved and it decided that jumps racing would continue beyond 2010.

The Ciaron Maher trained Al Garhood won the Brierly again in 2009, and then finished second to Sir Pentire in the Annual. After winning the 2010 Von Doussa Steeplechase Al Garhood strove to become the first horse to win three successive Brierlys. He looked set to achieve that feat when leading to the last fence, but the champion jumper Some Are Bent grabbed him 150 metres from the post and went on to win. Despite missing out in the Brierly, Al Garhood would go on to rewrite the Warrnambool record books. In 2010 he faced a strong Grand Annual field featuring Some Are Bent and Mazzacano. Al Garhood won easily. In 2011 Al Garhood became the first horse to have won two Brierlys and two Annuals. In the 2011 Annual horse Banna Strand, which lost his rider early in the race, created havoc at Tozer Road on the first lap. A group of about 50 people who were watching the race just near the Tozer road Double were horrified when a horse landed in their midst, seemingly out of nowhere. People ran away when the riderless Banna Strand leapt over a 164.5 cm high fence next to the first fence of the double into the group of spectators, injuring seven people including two children and an 80-year-old woman. All seven were taken to hospital, but four were promptly released. After jumping into the crowd Banna Strand jumped a parked police car, denting its roof, before cantering down Tozer Road and running through a children's playground. Following this incident, the Racing Club installed a running rail on the outer edge of Granter's paddock and installed retractable fencing at each of the road crossings to prevent horses from leaving the steeplechase course. Banna Strand returned in 2013. After finishing second in the Brierly he stormed home in the Annual under hard riding from Gavin Bedggood to claim a gallant Man Of Class, trained by Ciaron Maher, in the shadows of the post and win by three-quarters of a length. Maher would win his third Annual when in 2015 after finishing fourth in the Brierly, the tough six-year-old mare Regina Coeli joined her older brother AL Garhood on the iconic race's honour roll. Leading into the 2017 Annual, Maher and jockey John Allen hatched a plan to lead, reasoning that there was not a lot of pace in the race and that they should exploit the mare's strong staying abilities and her familiarity with the course. Regina Coeli led for most of the way and jumped brilliantly, becoming the only mare to have won two Grand Annuals.

The race from 2017 to 2021 was noteworthy for the battles between Gold Medals and Zed Em. From 2012 to 2021 Gold Medals appeared at the May Carnival every year expect 2013 when he was being targeted at South Australian Derby. Zed Em began his career in the care of master Kiwi horseman Kevin “Dummy” Myers who regularly sent him to Australia for feature steeplechases. The two's rivalry began in 2017 Briley Steeplechase won by Zed Em, Gold Medals finished sixth but in the Australian Steeplechase at Sandown Gold Medals won beating Zed Em neither horses ran in the 2017 Annual. In 2018 Gold Medals beat Zed Em in the Briley then his connections elected to run him. In a classic race Gold Medals was near the rear of the field for much of the race. Zed Em had raced keenly and rolled to the front in Brierly paddock the first time. Clayton Douglas gradually brought Gold Medals into the race after the field turned right and joined Zed Em over the last fence. Gold Medals was carrying 69.5 kg to Zed Em's 65.5 kg. In a great battle up the straight Gold Medals won by 0.1 lengths. In 2019 Zed Em turned the tables on his rival, scoring a three-length win from Gold Medals. In his past 13 jumps starts Zed Em had won nine steeplechases and finished second four times. Zed Em's winning weight of 70 kg is the heaviest impost carried to victory in the Annual since The Feline carried 11st 7 lb (73 kg) in 1950.

The COVID-19 impacted 2020 May Carnival was limited to two days, with an all jumps programme on the first day and flat races on the second day. And there were no crowds. There was again not much separating Gold Medals and Zed Em at the finish, but they were beaten by the Ciaron Maher trained Ablaze, ridden by Shane Jackson. Ablaze was unbeaten in three jumps starts going into the Annual and grabbed Zed Em over the last fence and won by eight lengths from Gold Medals with Zed Em 1.5 lengths back in third place. With no Abalze and a three-day carnival in 2021 Gold Medals and Zed Em went at it again. Zed Em lead for most of the race but was no match for Gold Medals late in the race. In the five steeplechases since the 2018 Annual Gold Medals had finished second in all of them. Gold Medals was the first horse to finish top 2 in four Annuals. In the four Annuals he contested Zed Em was the topweight for all of them. In their Grand Annual duels Gold Medals and Zed Em traversed 22 kilometres and crossed 132 fences – yet the net margin between them was 0.4 lengths, in favour of Zed Em courtesy of a three-length victory in 2019. Gold Medals’ record of two wins and two seconds is the best record of any horse in the Grand Annual - across 144 runnings. Zed Em has a win, two seconds and a third. Gold Medals was retired on April 8, 2022. Following a fall at Pakenham on Easter Monday 2022 Zed Em was retired. Ciaron Maher along with David Eustace trained the winners Heberite (2022) and Rockstar Ronnie (2023). The 2024 grand annual was won by the Symon Wilde trained stayer Count Zero who won by 0.15 lengths just two days after finishing last in the Brierly steeplechase by 37.4 lengths.

== Winners ==
- 2026 - Instigator
- 2025 - Duke Of Bedford
- 2024 - Count Zero
- 2023 - Rockstar Ronnie
- 2022 - Heberite
- 2021 - Gold Medals
- 2020 - Ablaze
- 2019 - Zed Em
- 2018 - Gold Medals
- 2017 - Regina Coeli
- 2016 - No Song No Supper
- 2015 - Regina Coeli
- 2014 - Chaparro
- 2013 - Banna Strand
- 2012 - Awakening Dream
- 2011 - Al Garhood
- 2010 - Al Garhood
- 2009 - Sir Pentire
- 2008 - Ginolad
- 2007 - Raazaular
- 2006 - Real Tonic
- 2005 - Frankoo Verymuch
- 2004 - Kwila's Quest
- 2003 - Sampan Man
- 2002 - Hibernian Prince
- 2001 - Hibernian Prince
- 2000 - Miracle's Star
- 1999 - Planet Hollywood
- 1998 - The Sundance Kid
- 1997 - Foxboy
- 1996 - Hoki
- 1995 - Hoki
- 1994 - Chantry Rise
- 1993 - Straight And True
- 1992 - Vinchiamo
- 1991 - Commission Red
- 1990 - Commission Red
- 1989 - Dunroe
- 1988 - Arabian Myth
- 1987 - Spring Fortune
- 1986 - Galleywood
- 1985 - Brigade
- 1984 - Rocky Affair
- 1983 - Venite
- 1982 - Meander Son
- 1981 - Kaimoto
- 1980 - Thackeray
- 1979 - Thackeray
- 1978 - So And So
- 1977 - Count Cobbler
- 1976 - Blackson
- 1975 - Gypsy Grey
- 1974 - Blueholme
- 1973 - Olympic Choice
- 1972 - Blueholme
- 1971 - Races Abandoned (Wet track)
- 1970 - Paston
- 1969 - Tache Light
- 1968 - Junction Lass
- 1967 - Yes Sir
- 1966 - Hoadsville
- 1965 - Barrier
- 1964 - Barongarook
- 1963 - Buxton
- 1962 - Grey Jet
- 1961 - Chateaubriand
- 1960 - Mudeet
- 1959 - McKenna
- 1958 - McKenna
- 1957 - Solight
- 1956 - Mac Union
- 1955 - Sohrab
- 1954 - Lowther
- 1953 - Accentuate
- 1952 - Hard Doer
- 1951 - Burling
- 1950 - The Feline
- 1949 - Bronze Laddie
- 1948 - High Flash
- 1947 - Quixotic
- 1942-1946 - Race Not Held (War)
- 1941 - Brightello
- 1940 - Martext
- 1939 - Wakerife
- 1938 - Montargis
- 1937 - Kennamon
- 1936 - Tardieu
- 1935 - Why Fail
- 1934 - Flavedo
- 1933 - Solo King
- 1932 - Jack's Jason
- 1931 - Welcome Stanger
- 1930 - Peter's Pence
- 1929 - Cooliel
- 1928 - Perpetual
- 1927 - Cooliel
- 1926 - Agricolo
- 1925 - Epictetus
- 1924 - Commonsense
- 1923 - Doiran
- 1922 - Orison
- 1921 - Cotswold
- 1920 - Megass
- 1919 - Ruralist
- 1918 - Tenarqui
- 1917 - Wasseca
- 1916 - El Progresso
- 1915 - Fireworks
- 1914 - V.M.R.
- 1913 - Arion
- 1912 - Tramp
- 1911 - Confederate
- 1910 - Alcuin
- 1909 - Mossbank
- 1908 - Quail
- 1907 - Napier
- 1906 - Napier
- 1905 - Black Tower
- 1904 - Wooral
- 1903 - Ranji
- 1902 - Tasman
- 1901 - Freedom
- 1900 - Butler
- 1899 - Mistletoe
- 1898 - Euro
- 1897 - Pevril
- 1896 - Pervil
- 1895 - Knebsworth
- 1894 - Corangamite
- 1893 - Macduff
- 1892 - Macduff
- 1891 - Shaneen
- 1890 - Native
- 1889 - Native
- 1888 - Adeline
- 1887 - Freetrader
- 1886 - Nuisance
- 1885 - Union
- 1884 - All Serene
- 1883 - All Serene
- 1882 - Aslanbegoff
- 1881 - Gazelle
- 1880 - Greystanes
- 1879 - Left Bower
- 1878 - Greystanes
- 1877 - Sailor
- 1876 - Aeneas
- 1875 - Postboy
- 1874 - Duffer
- 1873 - Freedom
- 1872 - Prior

== See also ==
- Grand National Steeplechase
- Grand National Steeplechase (New Zealand)
- Great Eastern Steeplechase
- Great Northern Steeplechase
