= Caleb Olliff =

New Zealand cricketer

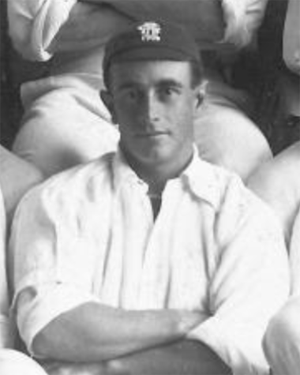

Personal information
- Born: 9 February 1883; Auckland, New Zealand
- Died: 21 May 1961 (aged 78); Auckland, New Zealand
- Nickname: Kay
- Height: 5 ft 3 in (1.60 m)
- Batting: Right-handed
- Bowling: Right-arm leg-spin

Domestic team information
- Years: Team
- 1903/04–1912/13: Auckland

Career statistics
Competition	First-class
Matches	20
Runs scored	411
Batting average	14.17
100s/50s	0/1
Top score	52
Balls bowled	3,472
Wickets	90
Bowling average	18.50
5 wickets in innings	6
10 wickets in match	2
Best bowling	7/42
Catches/stumpings	7/–
- Source: CricketArchive, 24 December 2015

Caleb "Kay" Olliff (9 February 1883 – 21 May 1961) was a New Zealand cricketer who played first-class cricket for Auckland from 1903 to 1913 and represented New Zealand in the days before New Zealand played Test cricket. In a Plunket Shield match in 1913 he took a hat-trick and at one stage took nine wickets for three runs.

== Career ==
Olliff was a leg-spinner, "a little man with a big break, who did amazing things with the ball on a sticky wicket, to the utter confusion of even the most experienced batsmen of the day". Only five feet three inches tall, he made his first-class debut for Auckland on Christmas Day 1903, taking 3 for 45 and 4 for 35 against Wellington. After batting down the order in his first match, he opened the batting in his second, and scored 52 (the top score in the match) and 32.

He played most of Auckland's matches over the next few seasons. His most successful season came in 1909–10, when he was the leading New Zealand wicket-taker with 23 wickets at an average of 19.47 and Auckland won all three of their Plunket Shield matches. He played for New Zealand in the first of the two matches against Australia at the end of the season, taking three wickets, but was replaced by the Canterbury spinner Don Sandman for the second match.

In his only match in 1911-12 Olliff took 11 wickets (6 for 37 and 5 for 67) in a two-wicket victory over Canterbury. In his last season, 1912–13, he once again led the first-class wicket-takers, with 19 at 13.10. Against Wellington he took 6 for 62 and 7 for 42. He finished the first innings with a hat-trick, then began Wellington's second innings by taking the first six wickets at a cost of three runs, giving him nine consecutive wickets for three runs. "A collection among the crowd realised £5, and a silver inkstand was presented to Olliff. A well-known ex-player also presented the bowler with an order on a local firm of mercers for a hat, with a stipulation it must be a belltopper."

Illness in 1913 compelled him to give up playing cricket. A benefit match was held for him in January 1914 between Auckland and the New Zealand Nomads, a team of country cricketers from the North Island.
