= Henry Parrington =

New Zealand cricketer

Personal information
- Full name: Henry Roberts Parrington
- Born: 7 October 1848; Thetford, Norfolk, England
- Died: 4 May 1926 (aged 77); Melbourne, Victoria, Australia
- Source: Cricinfo, 27 October 2020

Henry Roberts Parrington (7 October 1848 – 4 May 1926) was a New Zealand cricketer.

Parrington was born in England and moved to New Zealand as a young man. He played in three first-class matches, for Wellington, West Coast and Taranaki, between 1876 and 1883. He was Wanganui's most successful bowler, with 5 for 28 in the first innings, when the Wanganui XXII defeated the touring Australian team in February 1881.

Parrington worked as a solicitor in New Zealand, then Australia. He married May Louisa Corrigan in Marton, New Zealand, in July 1881. He moved to Victoria, where he began working as a lawyer in Warrnambool in 1887. He died in Melbourne in May 1926.
