= Len McMahon =

New Zealand cricketer (1887–1968)

Personal information
- Full name: Francis Leonard McMahon
- Born: 9 October 1887; North Sydney, New South Wales, Australia
- Died: 5 July 1968 (aged 80); Porirua, New Zealand
- Batting: Right-handed
- Bowling: Right-arm leg-spin

Domestic team information
- Years: Team
- 1908/09: Auckland

Career statistics
| Competition | First-class |
|---|---|
| Matches | 2 |
| Runs scored | 83 |
| Batting average | 20.75 |
| 100s/50s | 0/1 |
| Top score | 68 |
| Balls bowled | 114 |
| Wickets | 2 |
| Bowling average | 37.00 |
| 5 wickets in innings | 0 |
| 10 wickets in match | 0 |
| Best bowling | 2/43 |
| Catches/stumpings | 0/– |
- Source: CricketArchive, 9 November 2014

Francis Leonard McMahon (9 October 1887 – 5 July 1968) was a cricketer who played two first-class matches, one of them for New Zealand in 1914.

== Life and career ==
Len McMahon was born in North Sydney and captained the New South Wales junior cricket team before moving to New Zealand. His all-round form for the North Shore club in Auckland led to his selection in one match for the Auckland team in 1908-09. He took two wickets with his slow leg-breaks but was unsuccessful with the bat.

He moved to Gisborne in 1909. In consecutive matches for the local Wanderers club in 1910-11, he scored 91 not out and took 5 for 33 and 3 for 8 in an innings victory over YMCA, then scored 226 not out and took 1 for 3 and 6 for 14 as Wanderers scored 551 for 2 declared to defeat Taruheru, who made 43 and 34, by an innings and 474 runs. In the local 1911-12 season, he scored 698 runs at an average of 349, his scores being: 30 not out, 2, 85 not out, 108 not out, 131 not out, 135 not out, 161 not out and 46. At the end of the season he made 122 not out and took five wickets when Gisborne's representative team, Poverty Bay, beat Hawke's Bay by 110 runs in their annual match. Wanderers won the Gisborne cricket competition for five years running, from 1909-10 to 1913-14.

In 1913-14 McMahon made 82 not out to take Poverty Bay to a one-wicket victory over Hawke's Bay in January. He captained Poverty Bay in the two-day match against the touring Australians in February, when he made 87 not out in 128 minutes in Poverty Bay's first innings of 155. In the 16 matches played by the Australians on the tour, only three higher scores were made against them.

After New Zealand's loss to Australia in the first of two international matches, several critics urged the selectors to choose talented players from outside the four main teams. McMahon was one. He was selected in the second "test" as one of seven changes, alongside Chester Holland from Wanganui. New Zealand were still beaten easily, but McMahon made 68, the team's top score, in the second innings. He gave "a finished exhibition and his style impressed the spectators considerably", and after he had batted "without the semblance of a chance", his dismissal, given out leg-before to a left-arm bowler bowling around the wicket, displeased some of the crowd.

A few days later, Poverty Bay challenged Wanganui in the Hawke Cup. McMahon took 11 wickets for 142 but made only 31 and 6, and Wanganui, led by Chester Holland with 11 wickets for 88, won easily. McMahon played a few more matches for Poverty Bay until the 1920s.

McMahon was also a rugby football referee. In the same season he refereed the matches between Poverty Bay and Hawke's Bay at both rugby league and rugby union.
