= Tozer Road Double =

Pair of jumps on Warnambool horse racing circuit in Australia

The Tozer Road Double is a pair of steeplechase obstacles at the Warrnambool Racecourse in Warrnambool, Victoria, Australia. It makes up part of the steeplechase course at the Warrnambool track at the bottom of Granter's Paddock and is mostly famously used in the Grand Annual which is the longest horse race in Australia. The double is famous not for the difficulty of jumping but because it requires a 90 degree right hand turn to go back onto the cross proper before the final four obstacles, with the exception of the first lap of the Annual where runners turn left. It is famous for producing memorable moments and being a place where races can be won or lost.

== History ==
The first organised race at Warrnambool was held in 1948, just eight months after Warrnambool was proclaimed. Francis Tozer owned a horse called Black Bess, which ran at the first meeting and he became a founding member of the Warrnambool Racing Club. Tozer was among a group of people appointed as stewards to create a unique steeplechase course at Warrnambool which ran across the racecourse proper and into the then four paddocks. At the time Tozer Road was known as Racecourse lane but was renamed after Tozer and became Tozer Road. The original Tozer Road double was a stone wall and a log fence. Over time the physical fences changed but it has always remained two low fences either side of the road.

== Difficulties of the obstacles ==
The two jumps are located with about 1000 meters left in the race. Unlike the other obstacles at Warrnambool, they are currently composed of two EasyFix hurdles rather than two EasyFix Steeplechase obstacles, meaning horses are technically jumping hurdles as part of a steeplechase race. The difficulty has nothing to do with the jumps but rather the bend. The double is proceeded by a big climb up Briley paddock before descending steeply downhill. Through the paddocks, horses are naturally leading on there right leg as the track is right-handed, but because on the first lap of the Grand Annual they must now turn left at Tozer Road, jockeys need to flick the ride onto there left lead as they come down the hill to best take the corner. In all other races and on the second lap of the Grand Annual, the ideal way to jump is directly in front of the jump, ideally close to the inside, before aiming for the point of the corner of the second jump. A jockey must not go to early as the double is still 1000 meters from the winning post.

== Famous Moments ==
1909 - In a chaotic race Romuna already a long way behind leader Mossbank baulked at the first of the double and unseated rider A.D. Hughes who remounted (something illegal today). In the end despite falling at the second last Mossbank beat Romuna by five lengths. Only one other horse finished and every starter fell at some point.

1934 - In one of the many chaotic moments of the 1934 annual on the first lap, horse Merry Eye stopped at the double.

1972 - This was the first year the Grand Annual was run with horses turning right on the second circuit of the race. This was first trailed on 1 May 1970, however it was decided that the new course would be used for the 1970 race, the planned 1971 race was washed out, meaning the first race with the new course being in 1972.

1981 - With the race being run at a slow tempo, jockey Butch Londregan sent his horse Kaimoto to the lead with a circuit to go. He was jumping well until he got to Tozer Road and wanted to go left rather than right and surrendered his lead of about 20 lengths. Despite this he would go on to beat Thackerey by three lengths.

1986 - On the first lap of the Grand Annual, Galleywood stayed to the inside taking the double and saved about four lengths to take lead. On the second lap, with Galleywood leading on route to a win Glen Leith fell.

1988 - On the first lap of the Grand Annual, rider less horse Lacopolis ran across the front of the leaders nearly knocking down Mr. Spence as they approached Tozer Road before running into the neighboring paddocks.

2011 - On the first lap of the Grand Annual, rider less horse Banana Strand who lost his rider at the Alford Road jump, got to Tozer Road only to jump into a crowd of more than 50 spectators, with seven being taken to hospital. This incident was very similar to what happened in 1988 with Lacopolis.

2013 - On the second lap of the Grand Annual, leader Cash Advance refused to make the right hand turn and unseated his rider. Meanwhile, despite running last at that stage in the race, Tobouggie Nights went passed all other horses to take the lead.

2017 - On the second lap of the Grand Annual, racecaller Ric Mcintosh first introduced his catch cry of "Seriously How Bloody Good is the Bool?", which has become an important part of the carnival ever since.

2019 - On the second lap of the Grand Annual, jockey Steven Pateman positioned Zed Em in second place before moving into the lead at the Tozer Road double with 1000m remaining before going on to win.

2022 - On the first lap of the Grand Annual, Vanguard, who had won the Briley Steeplechase two days earlier, lost his footing on the flat after clearing the second fence at Tozer Road. Eventual winner Heberite, a then inexperienced steeplechaser grew with confidence through the race, but almost threw it away by only reluctantly turning right at the double on the second circuit.

2023 - On the second lap of Briley Steeplechase, jockey Aaron Kuru made the race winning move when he negotiated the double best of any horse in the field aboard Britannicus.
