= David Collins (New Zealand cricketer) =

New Zealand cricketer

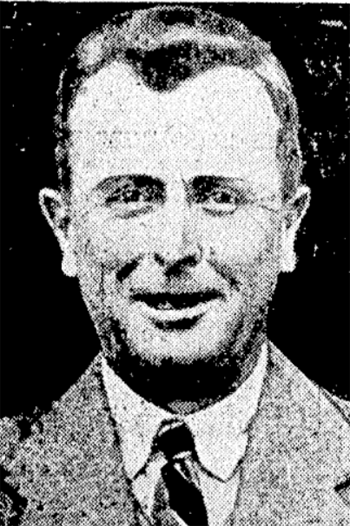
- Collins in 1935

Personal information
- Full name: David Charles Collins
- Born: 1 October 1887; Wellington, New Zealand
- Died: 2 January 1967 (aged 79); Tauranga, Bay of Plenty, New Zealand
- Batting: Right-handed
- Bowling: Right-arm medium
- Role: Occasional wicket-keeper
- Relatives: William Collins (father); John Collins (uncle); Audrey Collins (cousin)

Domestic team information
- Years: Team
- 1905/06–1926/27: Wellington
- 1908–1911: Cambridge University

Career statistics
Competition	First-class
Matches	53
Runs scored	2,604
Batting average	29.59
100s/50s	6/9
Top score	172
Balls bowled	1,486
Wickets	32
Bowling average	27.18
5 wickets in innings	0
10 wickets in match	0
Best bowling	4/10
Catches/stumpings	33/1
- Source: CricketArchive, 1 May 2009

David Charles Collins (1 October 1887 – 2 January 1967) was a New Zealand cricketer. He played 53 first-class matches between 1905–06 and 1926–27, the bulk of these being for Wellington in New Zealand and Cambridge University in England; he won a blue for Cambridge and headed their batting averages in 1910.

== Life and career ==
Collins' father William Collins and his uncle John Collins had brief first-class careers. His cousin A. E. J. Collins held the world batting record for 116 years to January 2016 for his innings of 628 not out at Clifton College.

Collins was educated at Wellington College, Wellington, before going on to Trinity College, Cambridge. In 1912 he became the first Cambridge student for more than 40 years to win blues at both cricket and rowing.

After completing his studies at Cambridge, Collins returned to New Zealand, where his most successful cricketing years were with Wellington in the 1920s. During this decade he scored four of his six first-class centuries, including the largest (and his last), 172 against Auckland in the 1924–25 Plunket Shield. He also represented Wairarapa in the Hawke Cup in the 1920s, and was captain and sole selector for the Minor Associations cricket team when it played its only first-class match, against the Australian touring team in March 1921.

Collins represented New Zealand during the MCC tour of 1922–23. In the match at Christchurch he scored 102, while at the Basin Reserve, as captain, he hit a second-innings 69.

Collins married Sybil Abraham in Palmerston North in June 1915. They lived on Collins' sheep station near Featherston in the Wairarapa. They had two sons and three daughters. One of their daughters, Susie Collins, was the New Zealand women's golf champion in the late 1930s.
