= Harry Barker Reserve =

Cricket and hockey ground in New Zealand

Coordinates: 38°38′59.30″S 177°59′43.83″E

- Interactive map of Harry Barker Reserve

Ground information
- Location: Te Hāpara, Gisborne, New Zealand
- Country: New Zealand
- Establishment: 1969 (first recorded match)
- End names
- Northern End; Southern End

Team information
Northern Districts	(1974–present)
- As of 2 November 2011; Source: Ground profile

Harry Barker Reserve is a cricket and hockey ground in Te Hāpara, Gisborne, New Zealand. It occupies 9.3 hectares and includes six cricket fields and nine hockey pitches.

== Establishment ==
The Gisborne City Council purchased the Turanganui Golf Course in 1962, and developed it into a housing estate on the Pacific Coast Highway. The houses surround a substantial recreational area, which the council named the Harry Barker Reserve after a former mayor of Gisborne.

== Cricket ==
Harry Barker Reserve held its first first-class match when Northern Districts played Otago in the 1974–75 Plunket Shield. As of April 2025 the ground has held 28 first-class matches, the most recent in January 2014. The first List A match there was in the 1981–82 Shell Cup when Northern Districts played Wellington. As of April 2025 the ground has held 11 List A matches, the most recent in January 2015. A three-day match between a New Zealand XI and the touring Zimbabwean team was played at the ground in January 2012.

As well as the main cricket ground there are several other pitches spread out across the reserve. The Poverty Bay Cricket Association often holds an entire senior three-match round of club cricket on the reserve simultaneously. It is the headquarters and main home ground of the Association.

== Hockey ==
The Harry Barker Reserve hockey stadium with blue Polytan synthetic turf was completed in 2015. On 7 April 2015 an international match was played there between the New Zealand and Argentina women's teams. New Zealand won 1–0. It was the first time an international sporting fixture had been held in Gisborne. The two teams returned for another match the next day, when Argentina beat New Zealand 7–1.
