= Ernest Bernau =

New Zealand cricketer (1896–1966)

Personal information
- Full name: Ernest Henry Lovell Bernau
- Born: 6 April 1896; Napier, Hawke's Bay, New Zealand
- Died: 7 January 1966 (aged 69); Wanganui, New Zealand
- Nickname: Bill
- Batting: Left-handed
- Bowling: Left-arm medium
- Role: All-rounder

Career statistics
Competition	First-class
Matches	28
Runs scored	651
Batting average	17.59
100s/50s	1/2
Top score	117
Balls bowled	3,457
Wickets	58
Bowling average	28.82
5 wickets in innings	1
10 wickets in match	0
Best bowling	6/35
Catches/stumpings	10/0
- Source: CricketArchive, 1 May 2009

Ernest Henry Lovell "Bill" Bernau (6 April 1896 – 7 January 1966) was a New Zealand cricketer who played first-class cricket from 1914–15 to 1927–28, and accompanied the New Zealand national cricket team on their tour of England in 1927.

== Life and career ==
Bill Bernau attended Wanganui Collegiate School, where he was taught by the cricketer Hugh Butterworth. A left-arm medium-pace bowler and left-handed batsman, in the annual match against Wellington College in December 1913 he made 52 then took 7 for 29 and 5 for 13 to give Wanganui Collegiate victory by an innings. In a senior club match in Wanganui in November 1914 he took 9 for 7, dismissing eight of his victims bowled, five of them for ducks.

He took 12 wickets in a Hawke Cup match (not first-class) for Wanganui against South Taranaki in December 1914, and made his first-class debut in January 1915 for Hawke's Bay against Canterbury, scoring 31 and 8 and taking 4/88 in an innings defeat. He did not play at that level again until he appeared for Minor Associations against the Australians at the Basin Reserve in March 1921. This was another innings defeat, and Bernau was personally unsuccessful, taking the single wicket of Alan Kippax.

Bernau finally tasted victory at first-class level when he played for Wellington against Auckland in the Plunket Shield in December 1922. Wellington ran out easy victors, thanks in no small part to Bernau, who scored 117 (his only century, including 20 fours) in the first innings, and took five wickets in the match.

In 1927, after several years playing minor cricket for Wanganui, Bernau was selected to tour England with the national side when the controversy over the eligibility for selection of Ted Badcock led to his withdrawal. Bernau took his place despite playing no first-class cricket that summer. He played in 16 first-class matches on the tour, and recorded his career-best bowling performance when he took 6/35 against Glamorgan at Cardiff Arms Park.

Bernau's final first-class matches were back home in 1927–28, when he played twice for New Zealand against The Rest, and finally for Wellington against Canterbury in the Plunket Shield.

He served with the New Zealand forces in the Middle East in World War I as a second lieutenant. Later he worked as a barrister.
