= Frank Ridge =

Australian cricketer

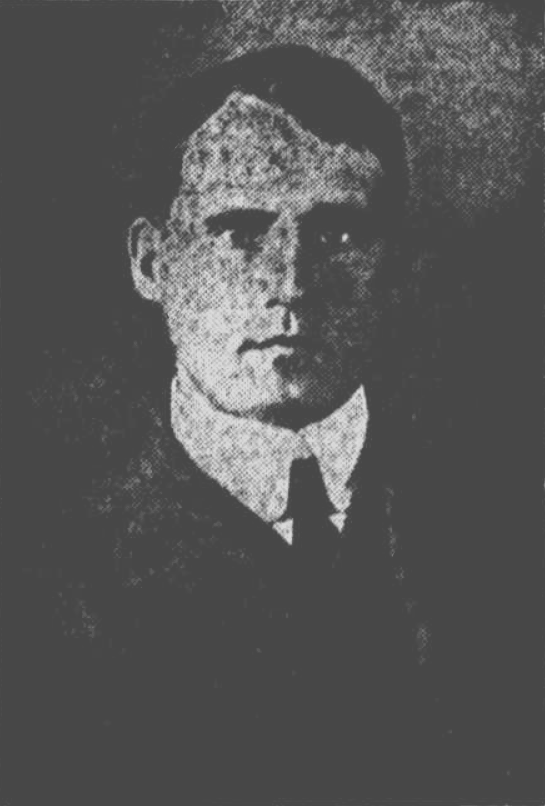

Personal information
- Born: 10 January 1873; Dubbo, Australia
- Died: 29 May 1959 (aged 86); Sydney, Australia
- Source: ESPNcricinfo, 19 January 2017

Frank Ridge (10 January 1873 – 29 May 1959) was an Australian cricketer. He played four first-class matches for New South Wales in 1895/96.

== See also ==
- List of New South Wales representative cricketers
