= John Collins (New Zealand cricketer) =

New Zealand cricketer

Personal information
- Full name: John Ulric Collins
- Born: 7 July 1868; Nelson, New Zealand
- Died: 12 July 1943 (aged 75); Ngongotahā, New Zealand
- Role: Wicket-keeper

Career statistics
| Competition | First-class |
|---|---|
| Matches | 6 |
| Runs scored | 77 |
| Batting average | 9.62 |
| 100s/50s | 0/0 |
| Top score | 26 |
| Balls bowled | 66 |
| Wickets | 1 |
| Bowling average | 43.00 |
| 5 wickets in innings | 0 |
| 10 wickets in match | 0 |
| Best bowling | 1/10 |
| Catches/stumpings | 1/2 |
- Source: CricketArchive, 2 May 2009

John Ulric Collins (7 July 1868 – 12 July 1943) was a New Zealand cricketer who played six first-class matches: one for Nelson in 1884–85 and five for Canterbury between 1892–93 and 1895–96. As a teenager, he had also appeared in a minor match for a Wellington XXII that had much the worse of a draw against a ten-man Australians side in 1886–87.

Collins was one of five sons and five daughters of the politician Arthur Collins and his second wife, Erica Elspeth, daughter of James Mackay, of Drumduan, Nelson, New Zealand.

Collins acted as wicket-keeper in three of his Canterbury matches, although all three of his dismissals came in one game, versus Auckland in January 1894. In his final appearance, for Canterbury against New South Wales in December 1895, he bowled for the only time in first-class cricket, taking the wicket of Frank Ridge in the first innings.

Collins was educated at Nelson College from 1880 to 1885. He earned a BA at Canterbury College. Collins began his teaching career at Wellington College, Wellington, in 1886, before moving to Christ's College, Christchurch, where he taught until 1906. He then taught at King's College, Auckland, from 1907 until he retired in 1935.

He died at his home in Ngongotahā on 12 July 1943.
