= William Barton (New Zealand cricketer) =

New Zealand cricketer

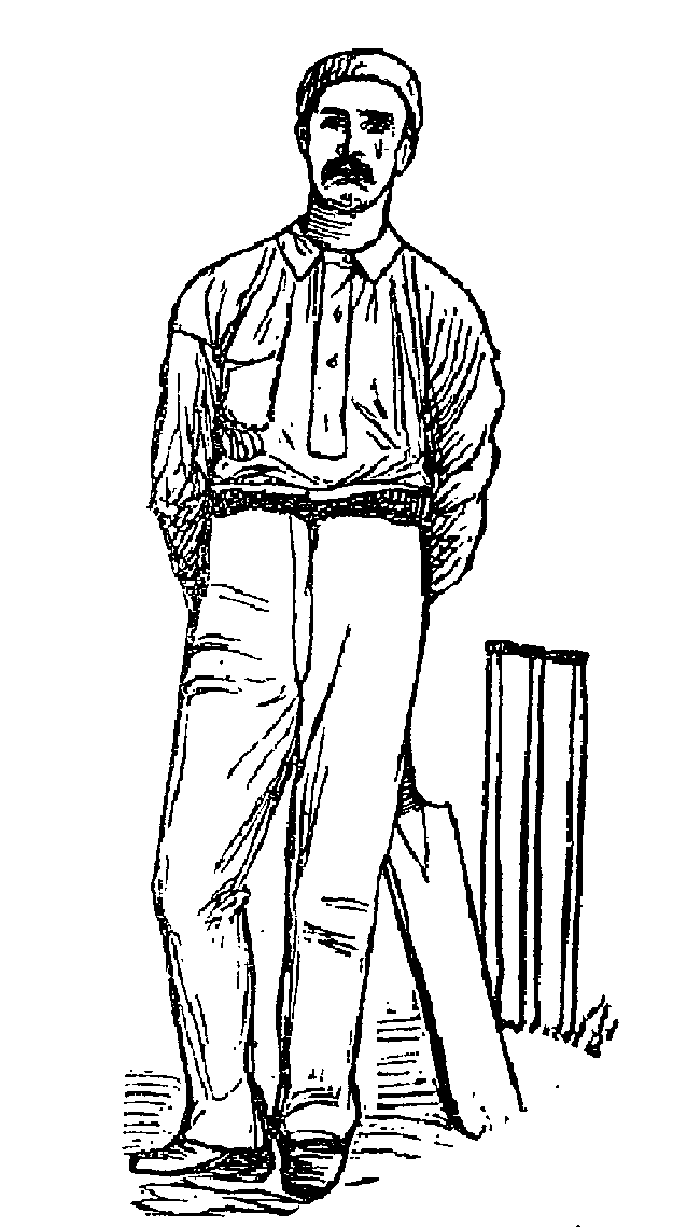
- William Barton in 1883

Personal information
- Full name: William Edward Barton
- Born: 3 November 1858; Hursley, Hampshire, England
- Died: 15 September 1942 (aged 83); Redcliffs, Christchurch, New Zealand
- Height: 5 ft 10.5 in (1.79 m)
- Batting: Right-handed

Domestic team information
- Years: Team
- 1879/80: West Coast
- 1882/83–1886/87: Auckland

Career statistics
Competition	First-class
Matches	10
Runs scored	464
Batting average	30.93
100s/50s	0/3
Top score	83
Balls bowled	287
Wickets	6
Bowling average	16.16
5 wickets in innings	0
10 wickets in match	0
Best bowling	3/25
Catches/stumpings	4/0
- Source: CricketArchive, 3 October 2014

William Edward Barton (3 November 1858 – 15 September 1942) was a New Zealand cricketer who played ten first-class matches for West Coast and Auckland in the 1880s. During his career he was widely considered to be the best batsman in New Zealand.

== Life ==
Born in England, Barton was educated at Cranleigh School in Surrey, where he was coached at cricket by the professional players Harry Jupp and James Street. He migrated to New Zealand on the ship St Leonards, arriving in November 1877, and worked for the Bank of New Zealand, first in Wanganui, then in Auckland from 1882, in Blenheim from early 1888, in Whangārei from late 1888, in Kaikōura from 1895, then as manager of the Rangiora branch from 1906. He retired in 1920, having served the bank for 43 years.

Barton married Eva Hamlin Stevens at St Mark's Anglican Church in the Auckland suburb of Remuera in November 1888. Both choristers since their youth, they were members of the choir of St John's Church in Rangiora for more than 30 years. They had one son, Frederick, born in Whangārei in 1891. Eva died at home in Rangiora on 29 July 1938. Barton died at his brother's home in the Christchurch suburb of Redcliffs on 15 September 1942.

== Cricket career ==
The New Zealand cricketer Dan Reese considered Barton the first great New Zealand batsman. He singled out Barton's performance for the Wanganui XXII against the 1880–81 Australian XI, when he scored 44 out of the 85 required to win, against the bowling of Fred Spofforth, Harry Boyle and Joey Palmer, in a match in which 51 wickets fell for 266 runs.

Barton's representative career began in November 1879 when, in a one-day match, he scored 67 for Wanganui against Wellington, in a match in which 40 wickets fell for 271 runs. A few weeks later, in his first first-class match, he scored 75 not out ("a grand innings without a ghost of a chance") out of West Coast's first innings of 120 in a victory over Wellington. No other batsman in the match exceeded 26. It was West Coast's only first-class match. Dan Reese later wrote: "For a couple of years ... Wanganui cricket reached first-class standard, chiefly on account of Barton, then the best batsman in New Zealand, being resident there. But neither before nor since have they been first-class."

Barton began representing Auckland soon after moving to work there in 1882. In a two-day match for Auckland against a Dunedin combined team in 1882–83, Barton opened the batting and carried his bat for 76 out of a total of 150; no one else in the match reached 35. A Dunedin cricket journalist later described Barton as "probably the finest batsman who has settled in the colony", a batsman "of uncommon brilliancy". Playing for Auckland against Taranaki later that season, he opened the batting and scored 74; no one else in the match reached 50. The Auckland Star commented that his innings showed why Barton had "the reputation of being the best batsman in the colony".

He made his highest first-class score of 83 for Auckland against Wellington in 1884–85, once again the highest score in the match: "The Auckland crack had played a magnificent innings, his hitting on both sides being well timed and judicious, his leg strokes being made in his very best form."

In 1884-85 Barton set a record for the highest score in a senior match in New Zealand when he made 190 for the Auckland Cricket Club; it was surpassed later in the season by a batsman in Christchurch who made 220. In all matches in 1884-85 he scored 922 runs at an average of 48.54, including three centuries for the Auckland club. In a match in January 1886, Barton, "a cricketer who has not been equalled in New Zealand for the number of centuries he has scored", made 195 for the Auckland club. In less than six seasons of cricket in Auckland he scored more than 4000 runs at an average above 40, with "nearly a dozen" centuries.

In early 1886 there was speculation that Barton might be included in the Australian team to tour England that year. The Sydney Globe newspaper recommended his inclusion, and the leading Australian Test player Jack Blackham also raised the possibility. However, the Melbourne Cricket Club, which was organising the tour, decided that selection would be limited to residents of Australia. It was the first time a New Zealander had been considered for Australian selection.

Barton was one of the first batsmen to play the pull shot to balls on the off-stump, a shot later popularised by George Hirst in England. He was one of the 14 players chosen in 1927 by the New Zealand cricket historian Tom Reese as the best New Zealand cricketers before the First World War.

== Other sports ==
As well as cricket, which Barton played for 40 years, he also excelled at lawn tennis, representing Auckland at the New Zealand Championships in December 1887. He was the inaugural winner of the Auckland Tennis Championship in 1886, and won again in 1888. In 1886 he had been undefeated in singles matches in New Zealand for eight years.

Barton was also a prominent track-and-field athlete, a champion croquet player, and a rugby union player and referee. He also took part in bowls, golf, rowing and hunting.
