= West Coast cricket team =

West Coast cricket team was a cricket team nominally representing the West Coast of the North Island of New Zealand, but actually from Whanganui.

West Coast appeared twice in recorded cricket. The first match was a first-class match against Wellington in 1879 at the Basin Reserve. (Note: This match is not always considered to hold first-class status with some cricket writers considering that the teams were not sufficiently high quality to be classified at that level. The Association of Cricket Statisticians and Historians considers it to be "doubtful", but does classify it as first-class.) Captained by George Anson, the team won its only appearance in first-class cricket by 6 wickets. In the low-scoring match, William Barton scored 75 not out in West Coast's first innings; the next-highest score in the match was 26. The team's second appearance came in a one-day match against Wellington in 1882. The New Zealand captain and cricket historian Dan Reese later wrote: "For a couple of years ... Wanganui cricket reached first-class standard, chiefly on account of Barton, then the best batsman in New Zealand, being resident there. But neither before nor since have they been first-class."

A West Coast Cricket Association was formed in 1888, based in Wanganui and including Hāwera and Feilding. It lapsed in the 1890s, and never fielded a representative team. It should not be confused with the South Island's West Coast Cricket Association, formed around the same time, based in Greymouth, which is still in existence.

== List of first-class cricketers ==
The 1879 first-class match was the only first-class fixture that six of the 11 cricketers who played for West Coast appeared in. Four of the West Coast players had previously played in a match now considered first-class, with opening batsman John Fulton the only one to have played in more than three first-class matches before the game. Only Christopher Cross, who played in a total of 22 first-class matches, went on to make more than 10 first-class appearances.

- George Anson
- William Barton
- Christopher Cross
- Henry Fitzherbert
- John Fulton
- John Lockett
- Thomas McGregor (Note: A left-arm bowler, McGregor took two wickets in the 1879 first-class match, the only one in which he is recorded. No biographical details are known.)
- William Moore (Note: Born at New Plymouth in 1862, the 1879 first-class match was the only one in which Moore is recorded. He scored three runs in his only innings. A printer by trade, he died at Wellington in 1894.)
- John Notman (Note: Notman recorded a duck in his only first-class match. He was born in London in 1850 and worked as a commercial agent after migrating to New Zealand. He played other matches for Wanganui, including against the touring Australians in 1881. He died at Wanganui in 1909.)
- Henry Parrington
- Francis Watson
