= Northern Districts men's cricket team =

New Zealand cricket team

Northern Districts

Personnel
- Coach: BJ Watling
- Chief executive: Ben MacCormack

Team information
- Founded: 1955
- Home ground: Seddon Park
- Capacity: 10,000

History
- First-class debut: Auckland in 1955 at Hamilton
- Plunket Shield wins: 8
- The Ford Trophy wins: 7
- Men's Super Smash wins: 4
- Official website: www.ndcricket.co.nz

The Northern Districts cricket team is a men's cricket team that represents the northern half of New Zealand's North Island (excluding Auckland). It is one of six major first-class cricket teams governed by New Zealand Cricket. The team competes in the Plunket Shield first-class competition, the Ford Trophy one-day competition, and the Men's Super Smash T20 competition. The T20 team is known as the Northern Brave (previously Northern Knights until the 2021–22 season.

Northern Districts were the last of New Zealand's six major teams to gain first-class status, joining the Plunket Shield in the 1956–57 season. The association comprises six constituent districts: Northland Cricket Association, Counties Manukau Cricket Association, Waikato Valley Cricket, Hamilton Cricket Association, Bay of Plenty Cricket, and Poverty Bay Cricket Association.

== Honours ==
- Plunket Shield (9)

1962–63, 1979–80, 1991–92, 1992–93, 1999–00, 2006–07, 2009–10, 2011–12, 2024–25.

- The Ford Trophy (7)

1979–80, 1994–95, 1997–98, 2002–03, 2004–05, 2008–09, 2009–10.

- Men's Super Smash (4)

2013–14, 2017–18, 2021–22, 2022–23, 2025–26

== Grounds ==
- Seddon Park, Hamilton (primary home ground)
- Bay Oval, Blake Park Mount Maunganui
- Cobham Oval, Whangārei
- Harry Barker Reserve, Gisborne
- Owen Delany Park, Taupō

== See also ==
- List of Northern Districts representative cricketers
