= Stuart McVicar =

New Zealand cricketer

Personal information
- Born: 15 July 1918; Woodville, New Zealand
- Died: 13 January 1990 (aged 71); New Zealand
- Source: Cricinfo, 24 October 2020

Stuart McVicar (15 July 1918 – 13 January 1990) was a New Zealand cricketer. He played in eleven first-class matches for Wellington from 1943 to 1951.

== See also ==
- List of Wellington representative cricketers
