= Poverty Bay cricket team =

New Zealand cricket team

Personnel
- Owner: Poverty Bay Cricket Association

Team information
- Founded: 1896
- Home ground: Harry Barker Reserve, Gisborne

History
- Hawke Cup wins: 1
- Official website: Poverty Bay Cricket Association

The Poverty Bay cricket team represents the Poverty Bay region of the North Island of New Zealand. It is one of the 21 teams from around New Zealand that compete in the Hawke Cup. Its base is in Gisborne.

== History ==
=== Early years ===
Cricket was established in Gisborne in the 1870s. A Poverty Bay team travelled to Taradale to play a team from Napier in March 1877. Poverty Bay and the neighbouring region Hawke's Bay thereafter played each other regularly. The Poverty Bay Cricket Association was formed in October 1896.

The touring Australian team played Poverty Bay in February 1914. It was the first visit of an international cricket team to Gisborne, and the Gisborne Borough Council declared a half-holiday for the first day of the match, a Friday, and gave a civic reception to the Australians on the Friday morning. The Poverty Bay captain, Len McMahon, scored 87 not out in the drawn match, and was later selected in the New Zealand team for the second match against the Australians.

=== Hawke Cup years ===
The Hawke Cup began in 1910-11. Poverty Bay played their first Hawke Cup match in April 1914, when they lost to Wanganui by 201 runs. After another unsuccessful challenge in 1915, they defeated Wanganui by three wickets in March 1919. They defended the title in Gisborne four times before losing to Wairarapa by two wickets in February 1921. Poverty Bay have been a regular competitor in the Hawke Cup ever since, but have not won the title again.

Northern Districts, of which Poverty Bay is one of the constituent associations, began playing in the Plunket Shield in 1956-57. The first Poverty Bay players to represent Northern Districts in the Plunket Shield in 1956-57 were Bernie Graham and Ken Hough. When Northern Districts won the Plunket Shield for the first time in 1962-63, Poverty Bay's Peter Barton was a member of the team.

Poverty Bay and the other five Northern Districts association teams compete each season in two-day matches for the Fergus Hickey Rosebowl. The winner has the right to challenge for the Hawke Cup. Poverty Bay also compete in the Brian Dunning Cup, the 50-over competition among the six teams.

The six clubs that compete in the senior Poverty Bay competition are Campion College, Gisborne Boys' High, Horouta, HSOB, Ngatapa and OBR. Most matches in the competition take place in Gisborne at Harry Barker Reserve, which is large enough to stage three matches at the same time.
