= Whanganui cricket team =

New Zealand cricket team

Personnel
- Owner: Cricket Whanganui

Team information
- Founded: 1896
- Home ground: Victoria Park, Whanganui

History
- Hawke Cup wins: 6
- Official website: Cricket Whanganui

The Whanganui cricket team (previously spelt Wanganui) represents the Whanganui District on the south-west coast of New Zealand's North Island. It also covers the adjoining areas of Rangitikei, Ruapehu and Waverley.

The team's governing body, Cricket Whanganui (formerly the Wanganui Cricket Association), has its headquarters at Victoria Park in the town of Whanganui. It is one of the 21 teams from around New Zealand that compete in the Hawke Cup. Since its first match in the competition in the 1912–13 season, Whanganui has won the title six times.

== History ==
=== Early days ===
The first cricket match in Wanganui was played on 31 December 1847 between two teams of soldiers. The Wanganui Cricket Club was formed in the 1850s. The Wanganui and Rangitikei cricket clubs played each other regularly in the 1860s.

Wanganui achieved a notable success when their team of 22 defeated the touring Australian XI in February 1881 at the Racecourse Ground. The pitch was hard and bumpy, and the Wanganui selectors had made sure they selected the district's best fieldsmen. With all 22 of them on the field at once, "their numbers and agility were too much for the Australians", who had only ten players. Wanganui also had William Barton, who was working in the Bank of New Zealand in Wanganui, and was considered the best batsman in New Zealand at the time; he scored 44 of the 85 runs Wanganui required to win. Australia did not lose another match in New Zealand until 1967.

After abortive attempts in the 1880s and early 1890s, the Wanganui Cricket Association was formed in 1896. At first it had only five competing teams: Wanganui A and B, United, and Collegiate School I and II. It affiliated with NZCC in 1898, C. R. Clark of Christchurch representing the Association as delegate.

=== Hawke Cup ===
Wanganui first competed in the Hawke Cup in 1912–13. Captained by Hugh Butterworth, they won their elimination match against South Taranaki by an innings and 394 runs. They first won the title in 1913–14, when they beat South Auckland, thanks to the all-rounders Chester Holland, Bill Bernau and James Hussey. On the basis of his form for Wanganui, Holland was selected to represent New Zealand against the touring Australians later that season. Wanganui held the Hawke Cup against several challenges and kept it through the hiatus caused by World War I before losing narrowly to Poverty Bay in March 1919.

Wanganui were the strongest team in the Hawke Cup in the 1920s. Playing until 1928, Chester Holland established a record for Hawke Cup challenge matches of 189 wickets which has never been equalled. He also took 10 for 35 against South Taranaki in 1922–23, which is still the only instance of ten wickets in an innings in Hawke Cup challenge matches. Bill Bernau also continued playing for Wanganui, showing such good all-round form that he was included in the New Zealand team to England in 1927 based purely on his matches for Wanganui.

The captain for much of the 1920s was George Orr, of whom the New Zealand cricket historian Tom Reese wrote that he "not only proved himself a very sound batsman but seemed by his successes to inspire the others". Also a fine slips fieldsman, Orr later coached Wanganui to the Hawke Cup title in the 1940s.

Wanganui was one of the original constituent associations that made up the Central Districts team, which began competing in the Plunket Shield in the 1950–51 season. The two Wanganui players in the inaugural team were Harry Cave and Don Beard. While still occasionally playing for Wanganui, Cave captained the New Zealand Test team in the mid-1950s. Captained by Ron Thomas, Wanganui held the Hawke Cup between January 1953 and December 1955.

As of the 2023–24 season, there are nine senior clubs in the association: Combined Whanganui, Kaitoke, Marist, Marton Saracens, Renegades, Taihape, Tech, Whanganui United and Wicket Warriors.

== See also ==
- West Coast cricket team
