= 2011 in New Zealand =

- Decades: 1990s; 2000s; 2010s; 2020s
- See also: History of New Zealand; List of years in New Zealand; Timeline of New Zealand history

The following lists events that happened during 2011 in New Zealand.

== Population ==
- Estimated population as of 31 December: 4,399,400.
- Increase since 31 December 2010: 25,600 (0.58%).
- Males per 100 Females: 95.7.

== Incumbents ==
=== Regal and vice-regal ===
- Head of State – Elizabeth II
- Governor-General – Sir Anand Satyanand, succeeded by Sir Jerry Mateparae
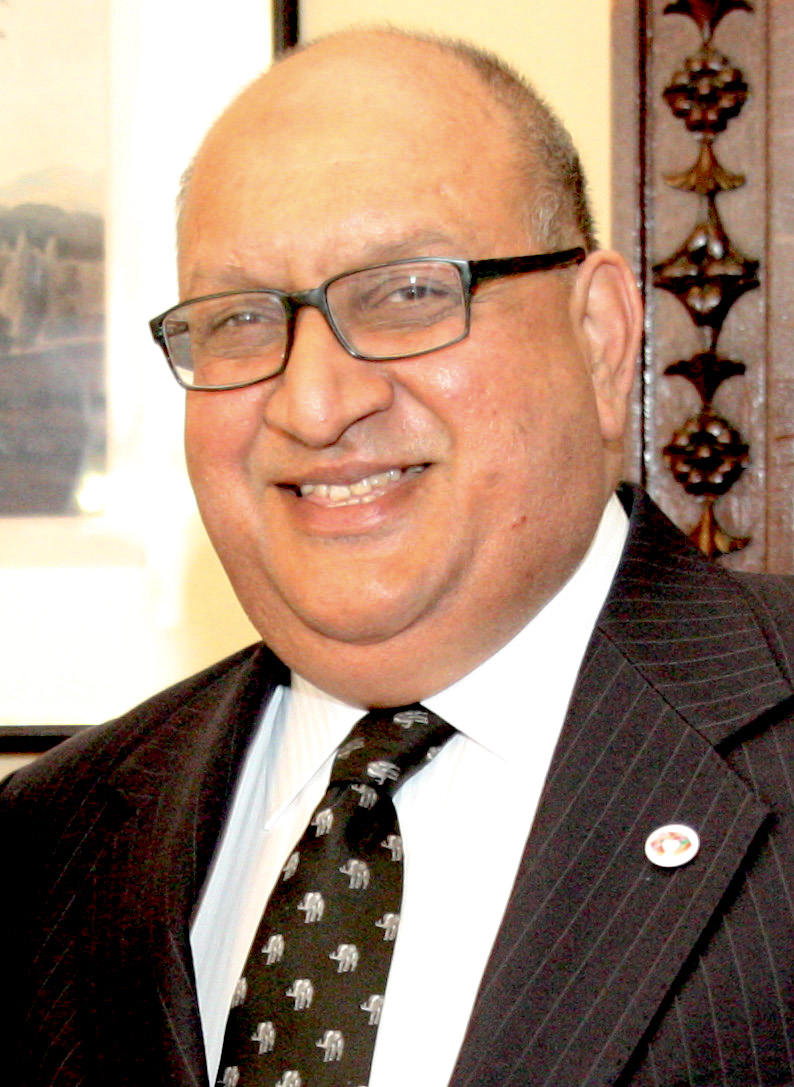
Sir Anand Satyanand

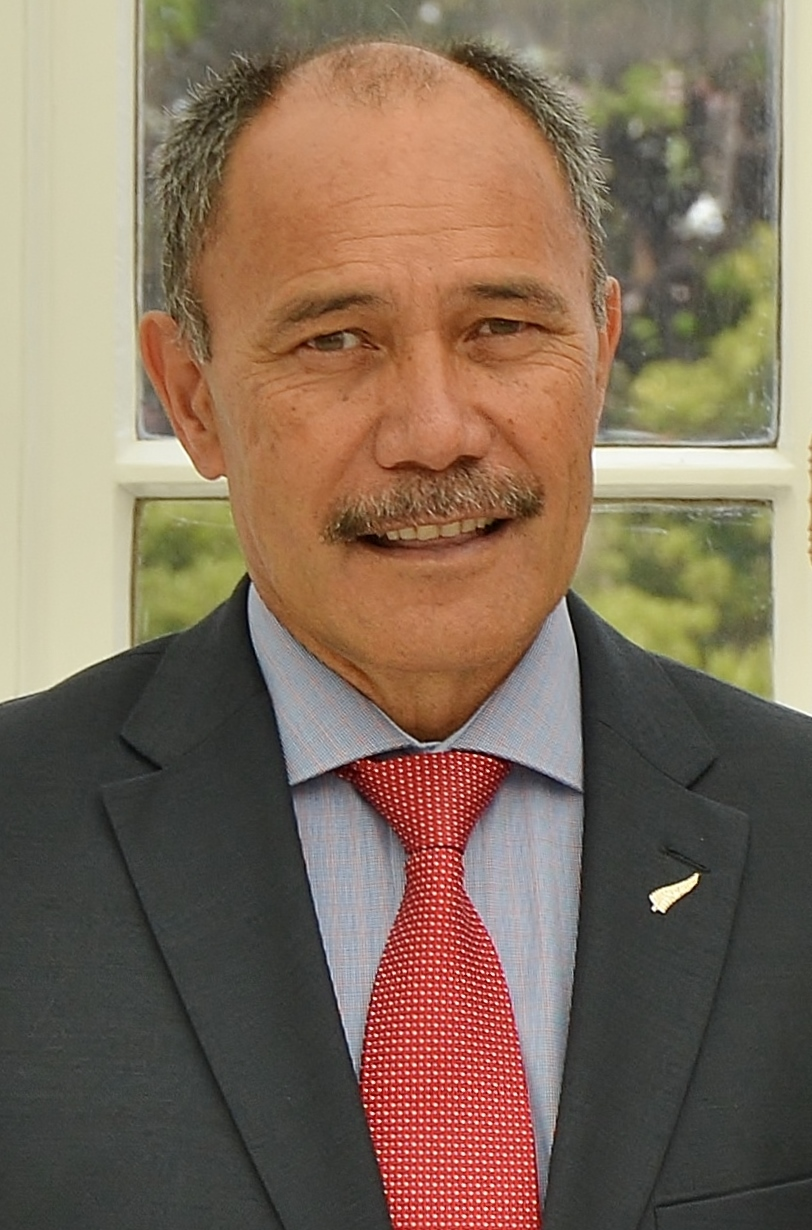
Sir Jerry Mateparae

=== Government ===
2011 was the third and last full year of the 49th Parliament, which was dissolved on 20 October. A general election was held on 26 November to elect the 50th Parliament, which saw the Fifth National Government elected for a second term.

- Speaker of the House – Lockwood Smith
- Prime Minister – John Key
- Deputy Prime Minister – Bill English
- Minister of Finance – Bill English
- Minister of Foreign Affairs – Murray McCully
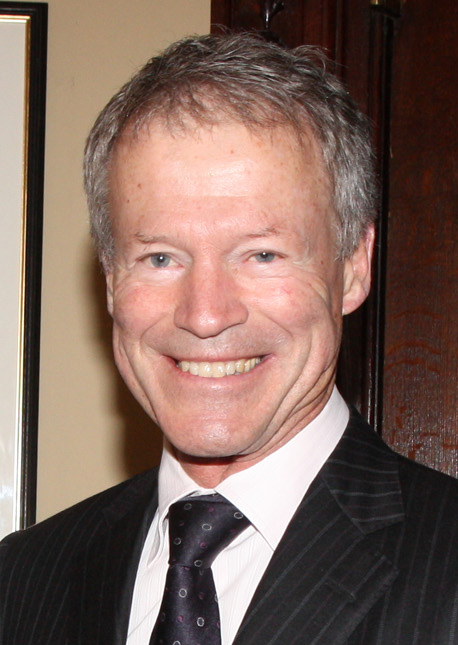
Lockwood Smith

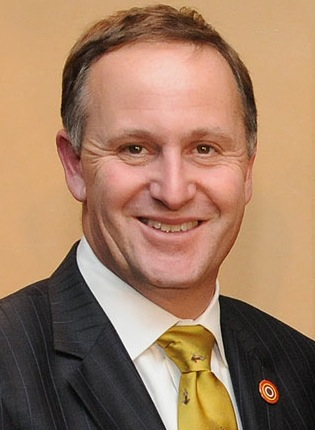
John Key

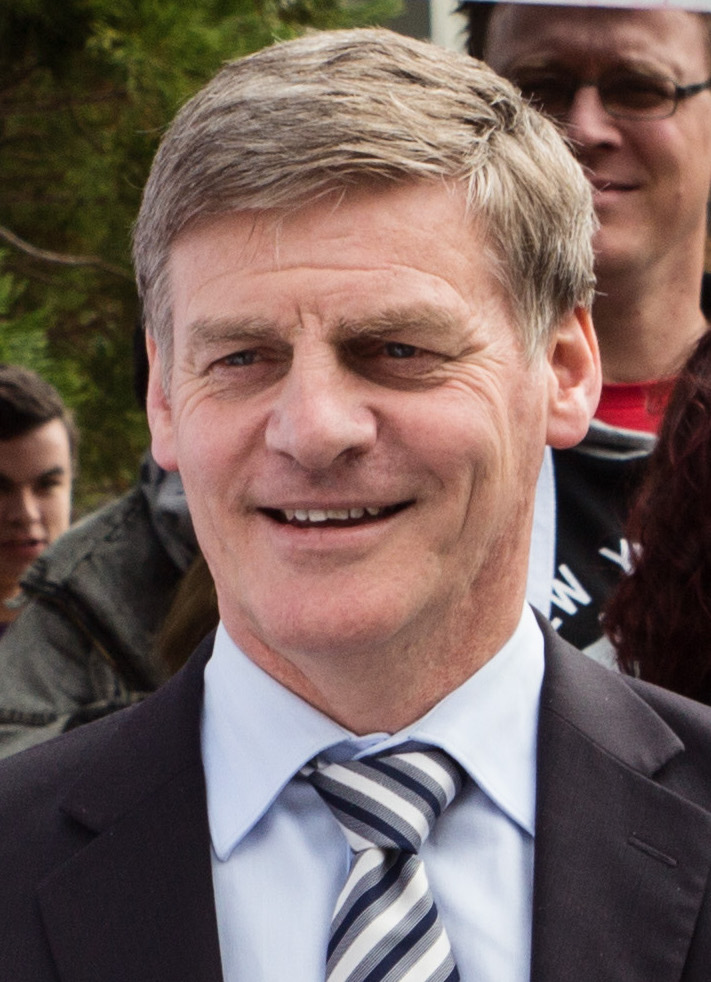
Bill English

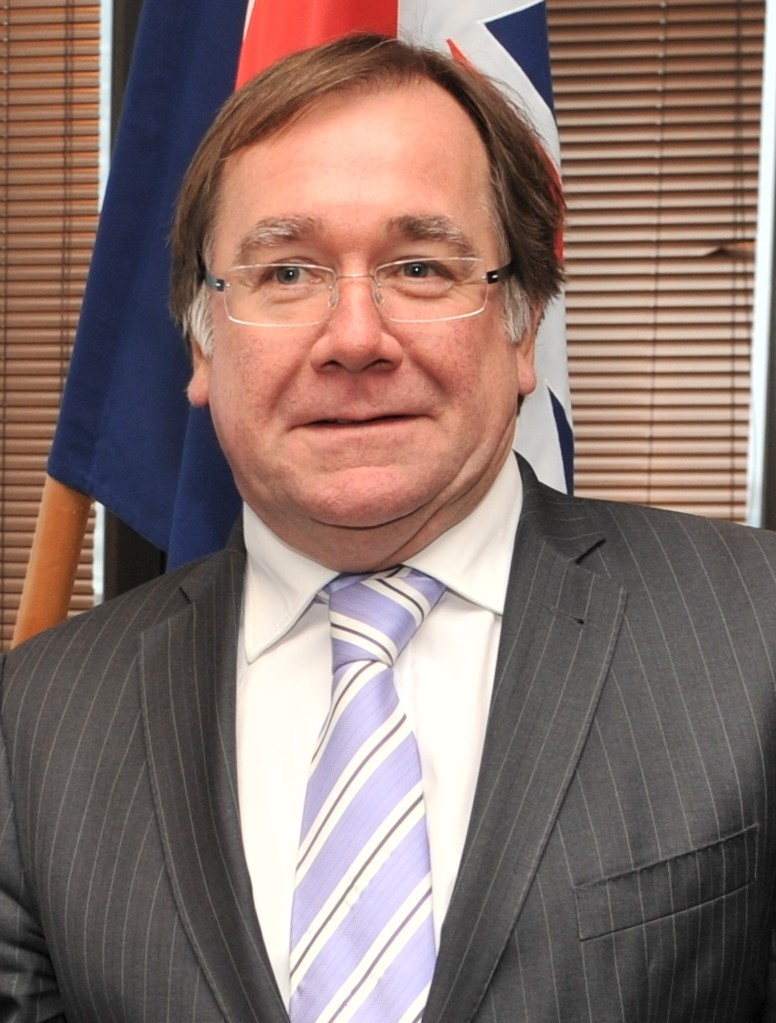
Murray McCully

=== Other Party leaders ===
- Labour – Phil Goff until 13 December, then David Shearer from 13 December. (Leader of the Opposition)
- ACT – Rodney Hide until 30 April, then Don Brash 30 April to 26 November (John Boscawen parliamentary leader), then TBD.
- Green – Metiria Turei and Russel Norman
- Māori Party – Tariana Turia and Pita Sharples
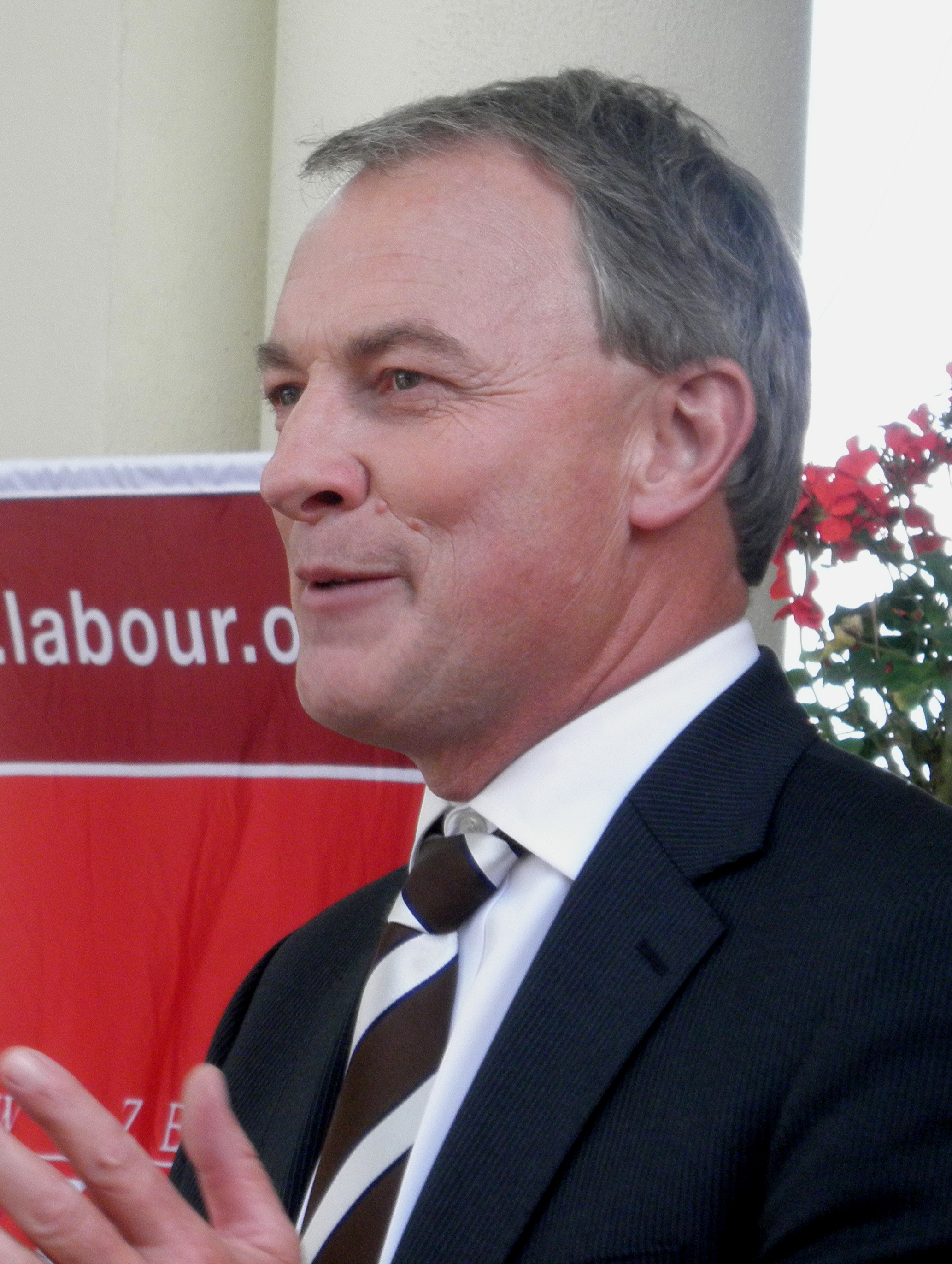
Phil Goff

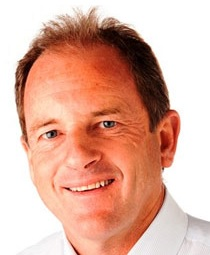
David Shearer

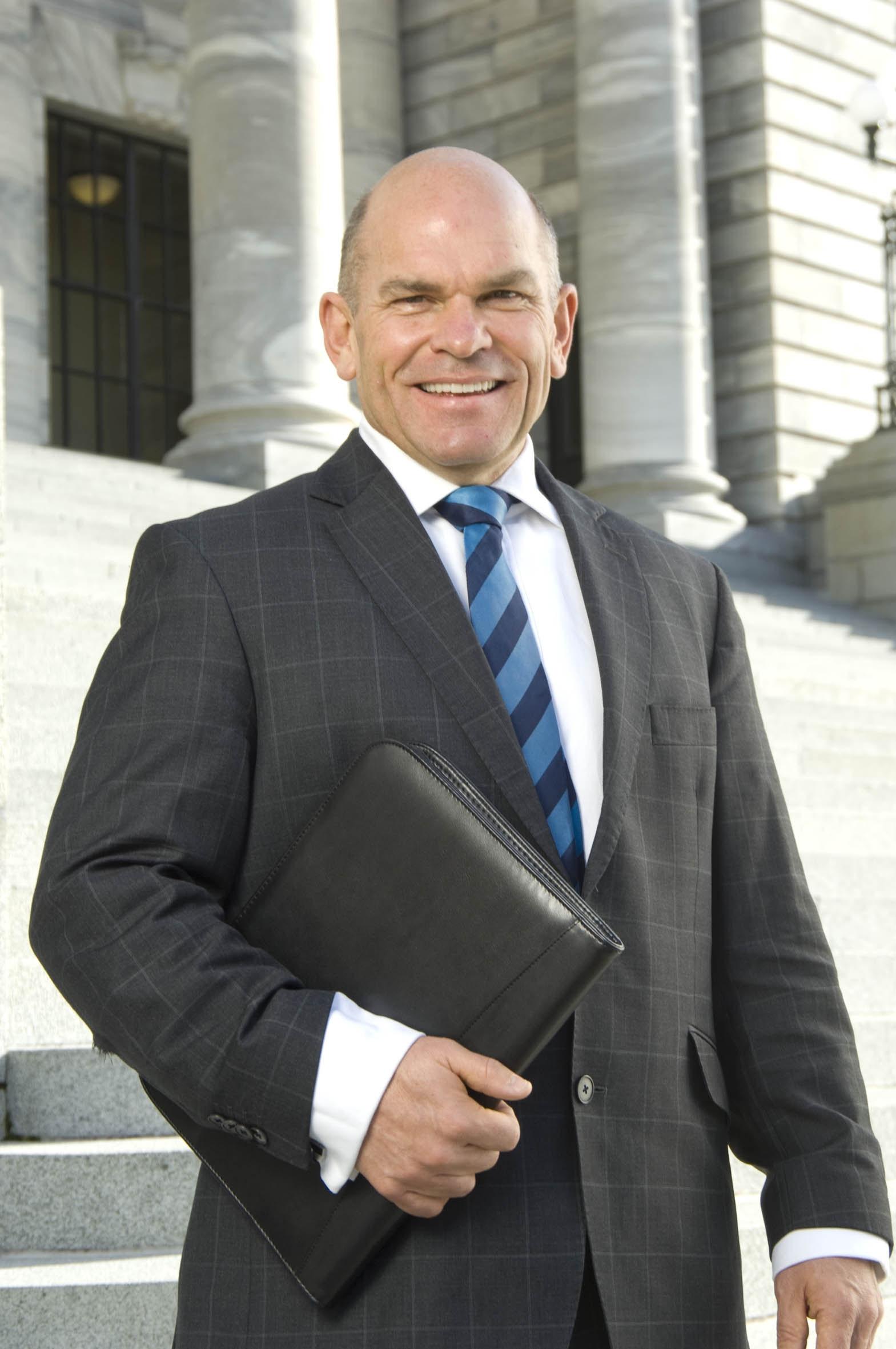
Rodney Hide

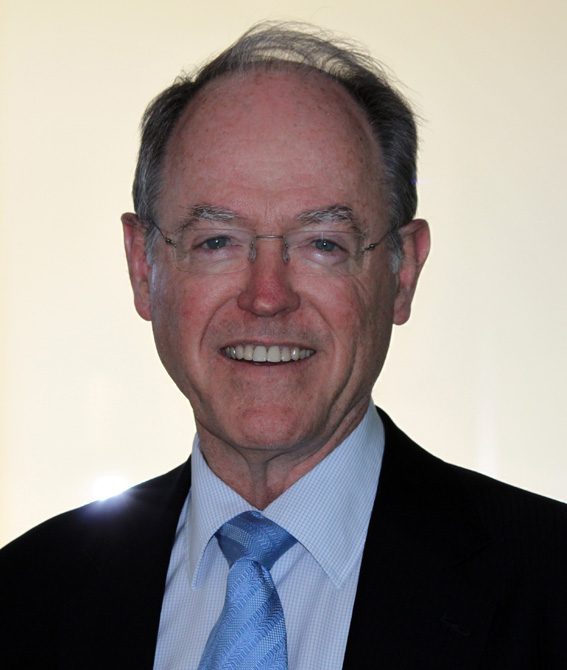
Don Brash

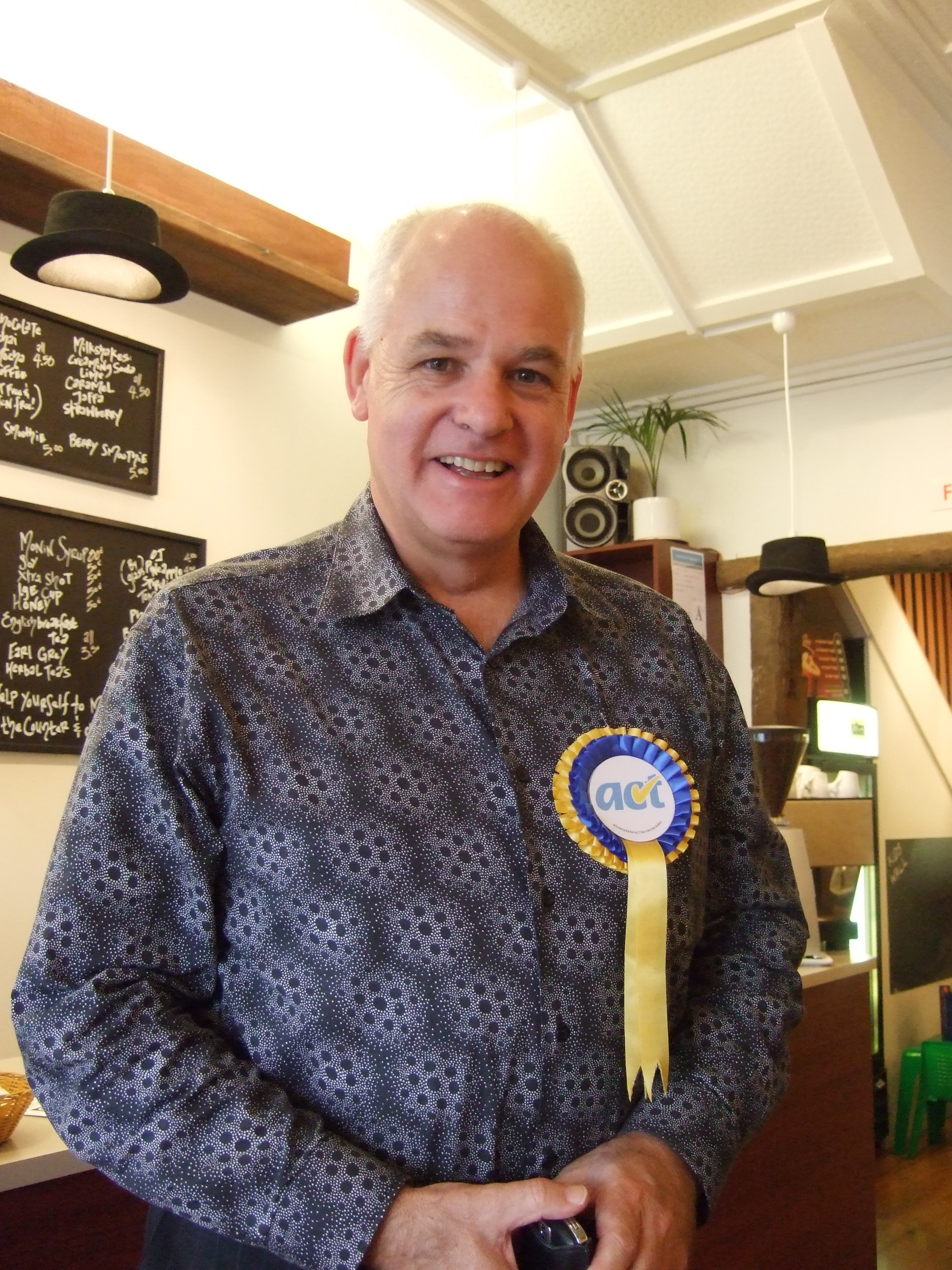
John Boscawen

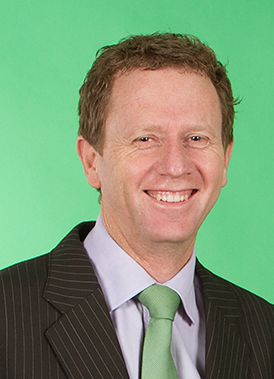
Russel Norman

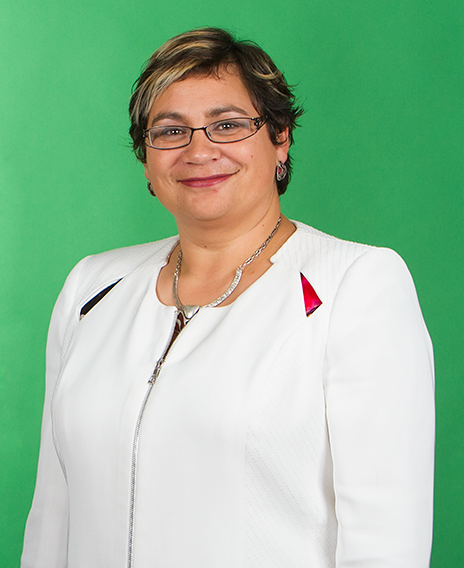
Metiria Turei

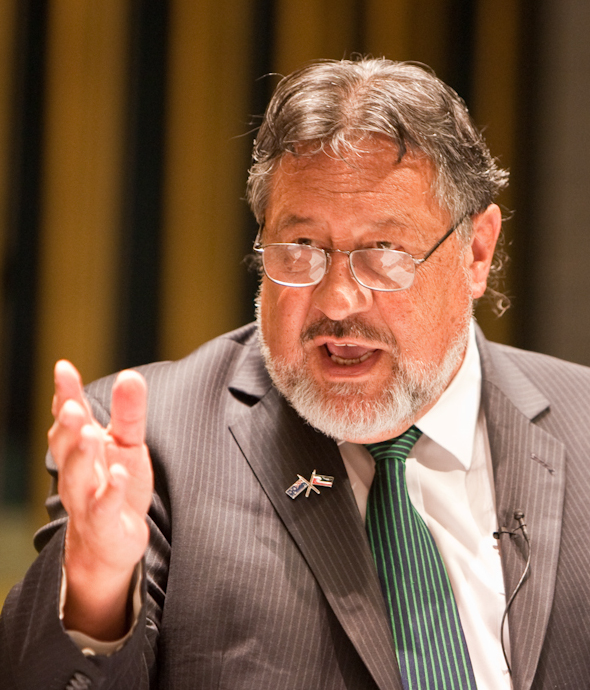
Pita Sharples

=== Judiciary ===
- Chief Justice – Sian Elias
- President of the Court of Appeal – Mark O'Regan
- Chief High Court judge – Helen Winkelmann
- Chief District Court judge – Russell Johnson until 24 July, and then Jan-Marie Doogue from 1 September
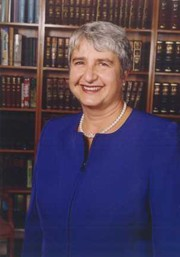
Sian Elias

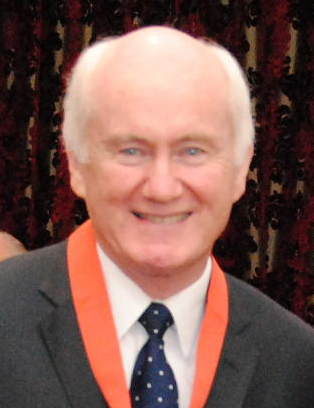
Mark O'Regan

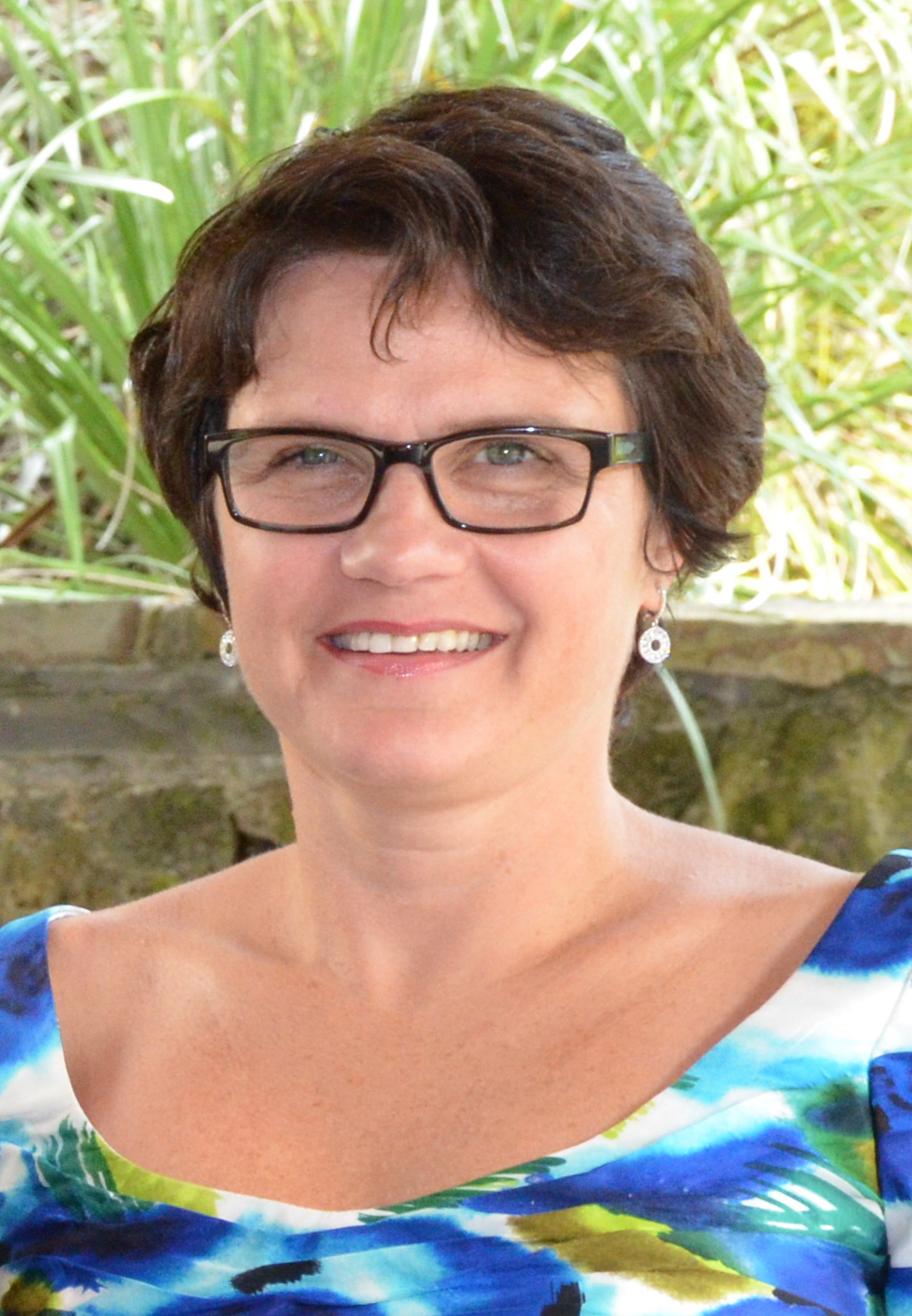
Helen Winkelmann

=== Main centre leaders ===
- Mayor of Auckland – Len Brown
- Mayor of Tauranga – Stuart Crosby
- Mayor of Hamilton – Julie Hardaker
- Mayor of Wellington – Celia Wade-Brown
- Mayor of Christchurch – Bob Parker
- Mayor of Dunedin – Dave Cull
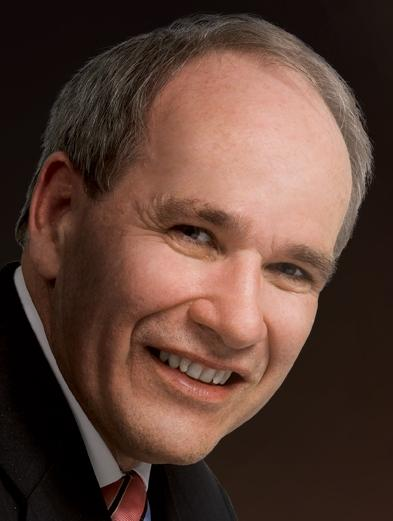
Len Brown

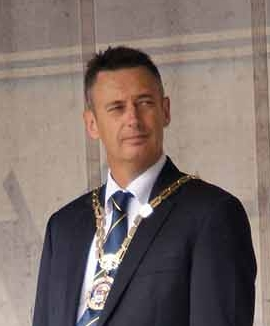
Stuart Crosby

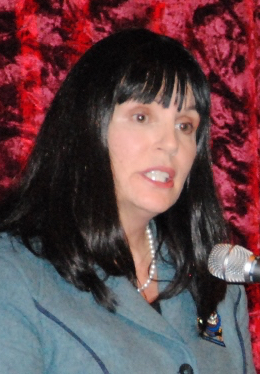
Julie Hardaker

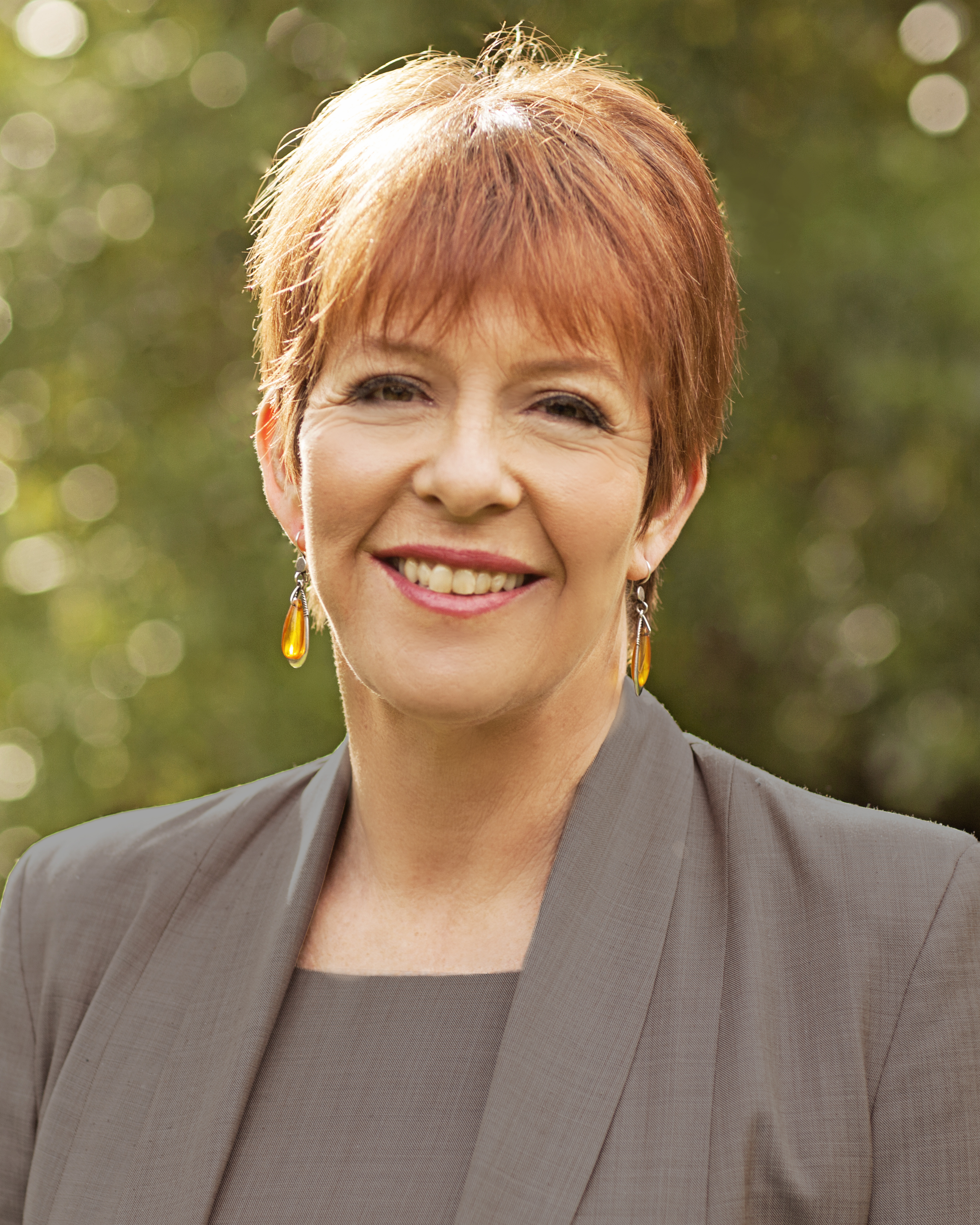
Celia Wade-Brown

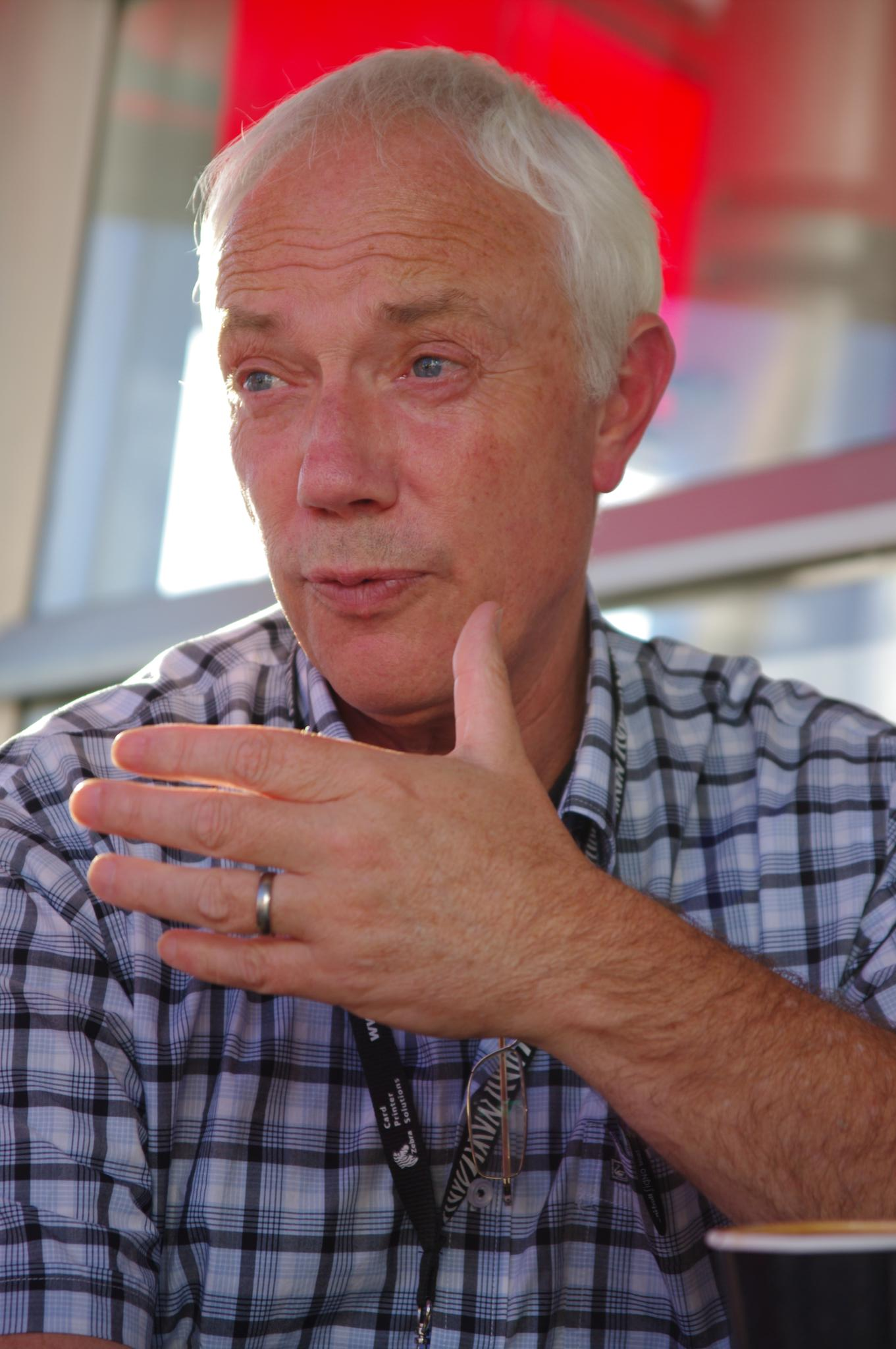
Bob Parker

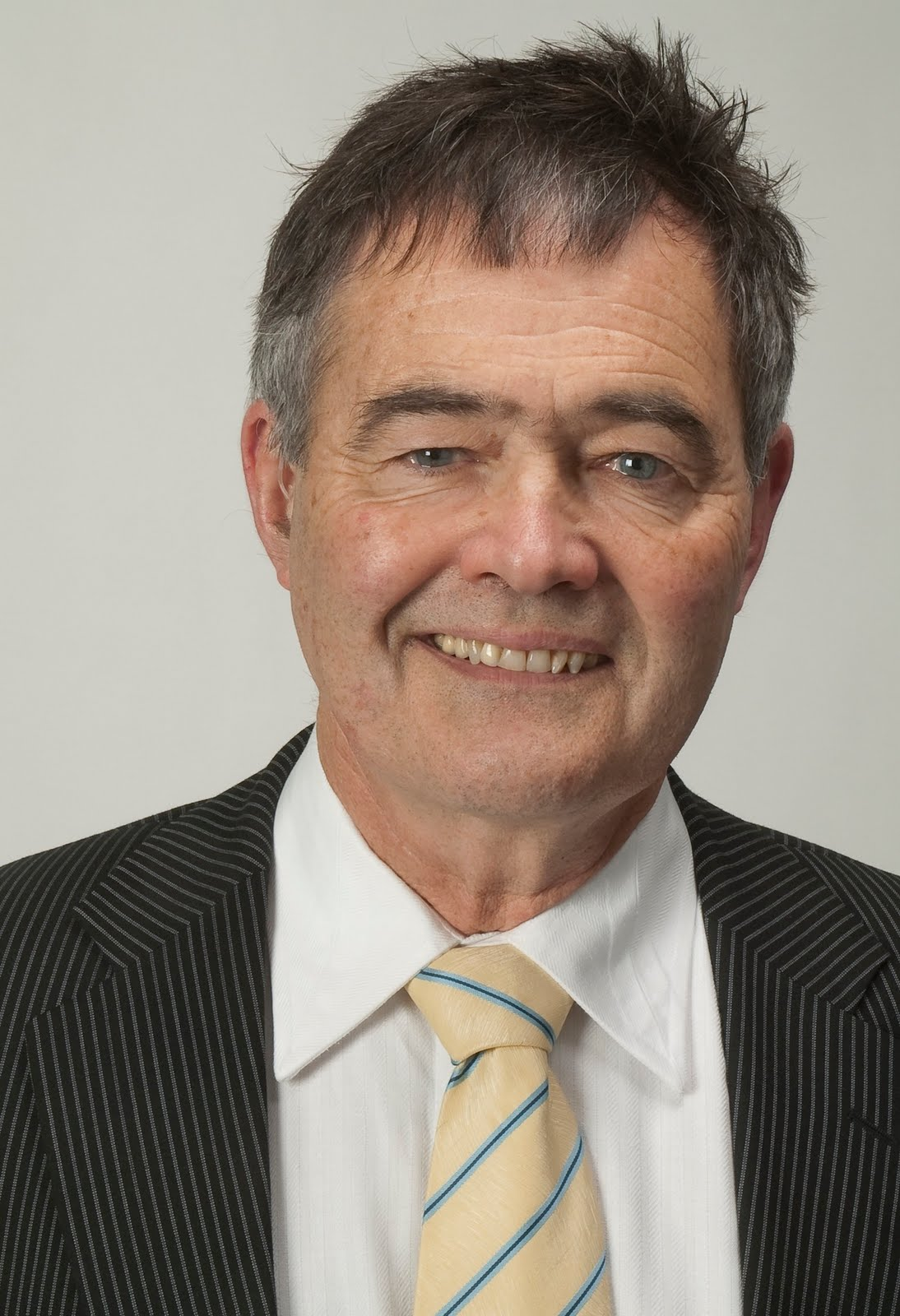
Dave Cull

== Events ==
=== February ===
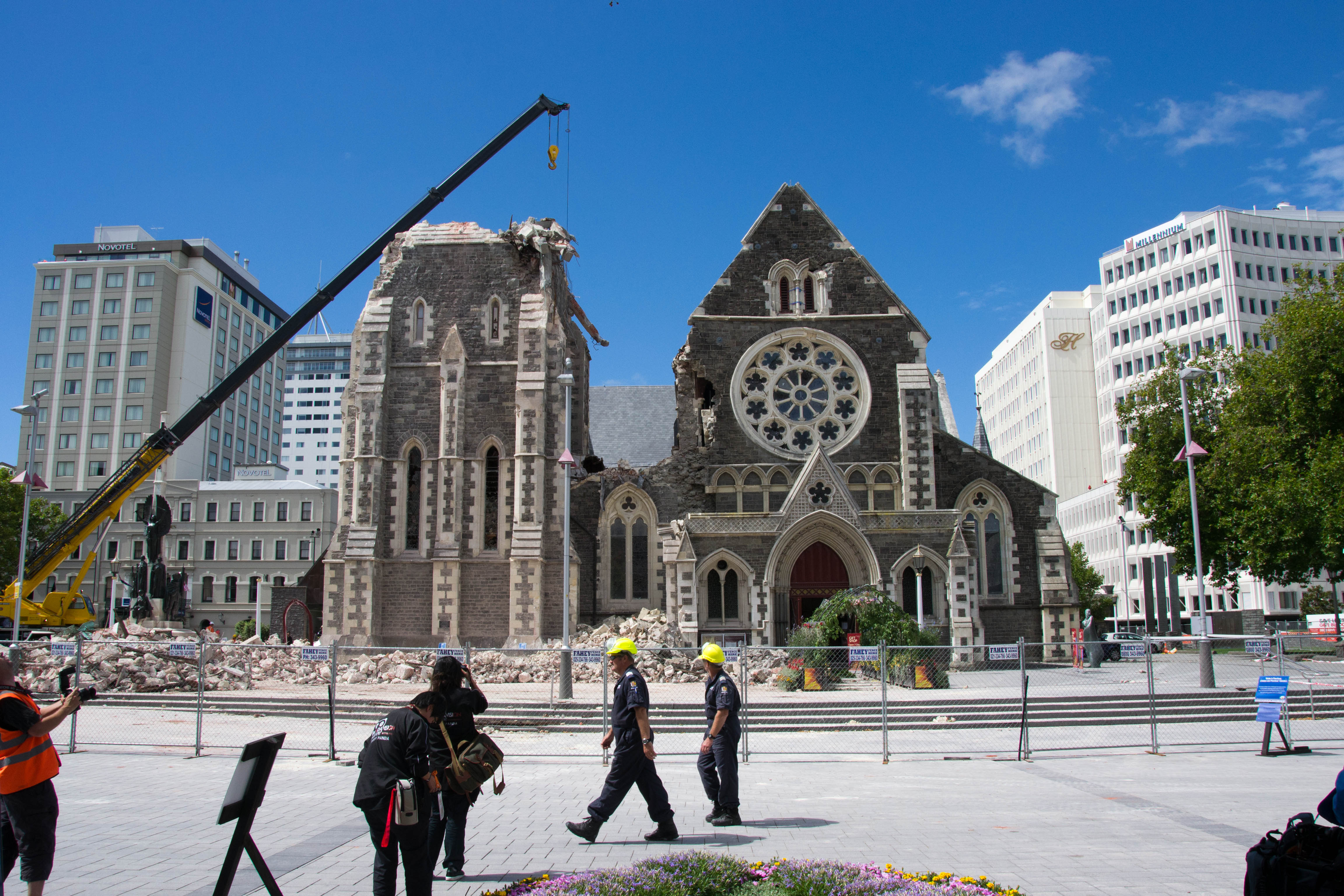
ChristChurch Cathedral and the Cathedral Square two days after the 6.3 magnitude earthquake

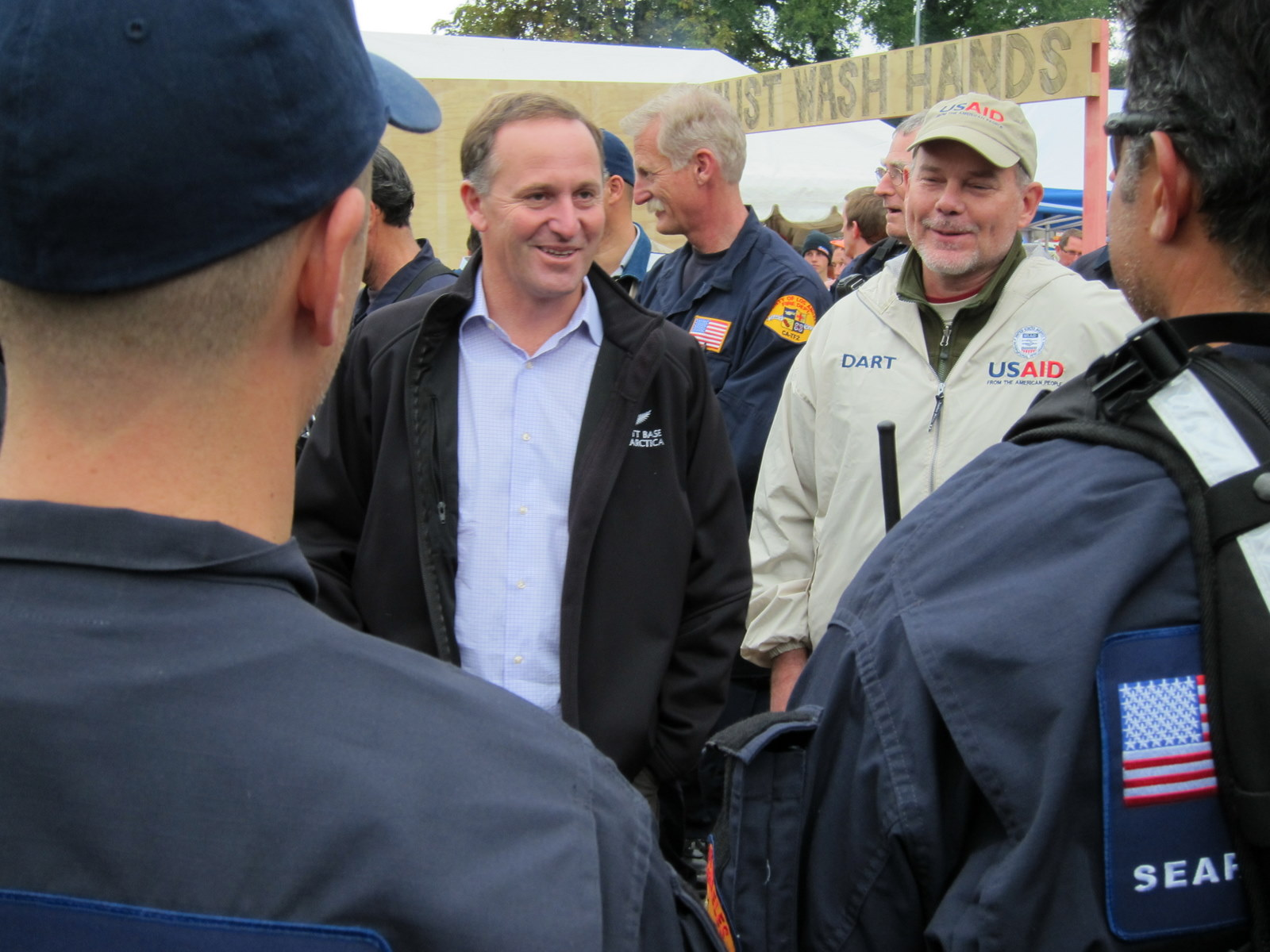
New Zealand Prime Minister John Key visiting the United States Agency for International Development (USAID) Disaster Assistance Response Team (DART) base of operations at Latimer Square, Christchurch. Following the devastating earthquake, Key is thanking DART Team leader Al Dwyer and talking to the team.

- 16 February – Australian Prime Minister Julia Gillard becomes the first foreign head of government to address the New Zealand Parliament while in session.
- 22 February – A 6.3 magnitude earthquake strikes Christchurch, causing major damage to the city and killing 185 people.
- 23 February – Prime Minister John Key declares a national state of emergency following the Christchurch earthquake, the first national state of emergency in 60 years.

=== March ===
- 5 March – A by-election is held in the Botany electorate and won by Jami-Lee Ross of the National Party.
- 8 March – Five-yearly New Zealand census was scheduled but cancelled due to the effects of the Christchurch earthquake.
- 18 March – A memorial service for the victims of the Christchurch earthquake is held at Hagley Park, attended by Prince William on behalf of the Queen of New Zealand.
- 24 March – New Zealand foreshore and seabed controversy: The Marine and Coastal Area (Takutai Moana) Bill, an act to replace the Foreshore and Seabed Act 2004, passes its third reading in Parliament.
- 29 March – The Canterbury Earthquake Recovery Authority is established.

=== April ===
- 28 April – A state of emergency is declared in the Hawke's Bay due to flooding.
- 30 April – The national state of emergency put into place after the 22 February Christchurch earthquake is lifted.

=== May ===
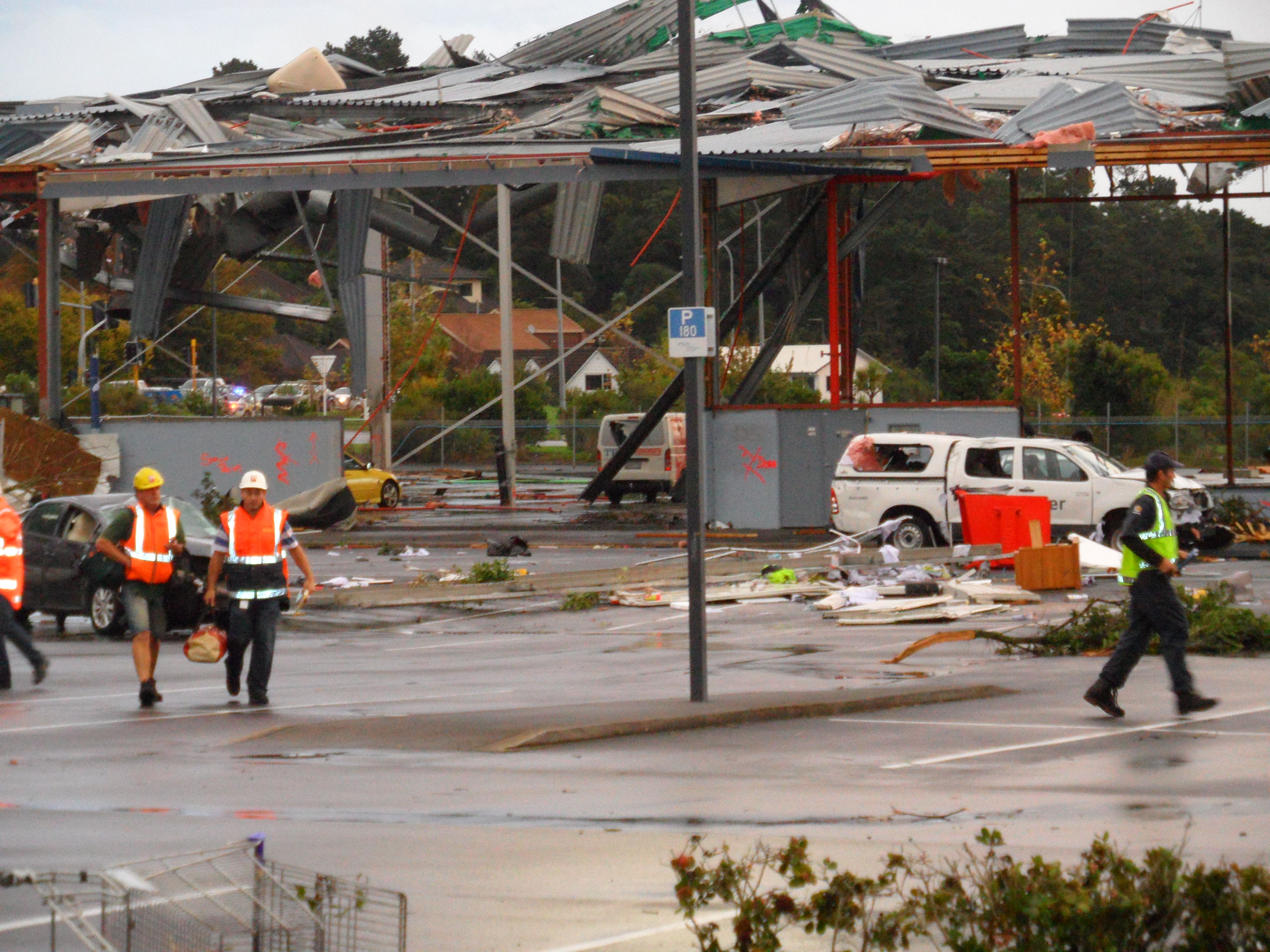
Structural damage caused by the Albany tornado

- 3 May – A tornado hits the suburb of Albany in northern Auckland, killing one and causing property damage.
- 19 May – Minister of Finance Bill English delivers the "Zero Budget", an atypical election year government budget which plans $1.2b worth of spending cuts over the next four years.

=== June ===
- 13 June – A magnitude 6.3 earthquake aftershock strikes Christchurch, causing additional earthquake damage to the city.
- 16–26 June – Ash from the Puyehue-Cordón Caulle volcano in Chile causes widespread disruption to flights across New Zealand.
- 21 June – An emperor penguin, later nicknamed "Happy Feet" after the 2006 film, is found washed up on the Kāpiti Coast, the first emperor penguin to be found in New Zealand for 44 years.
- 24 June — Christchurch's system for residential zoning is announced to assess damage and rebuildability following the earthquakes, which includes the red zone, orange zone, green zone and white zone.
- 25 June – A by-election is held in the Te Tai Tokerau electorate and won by Hone Harawira of the Mana Party.

=== July ===
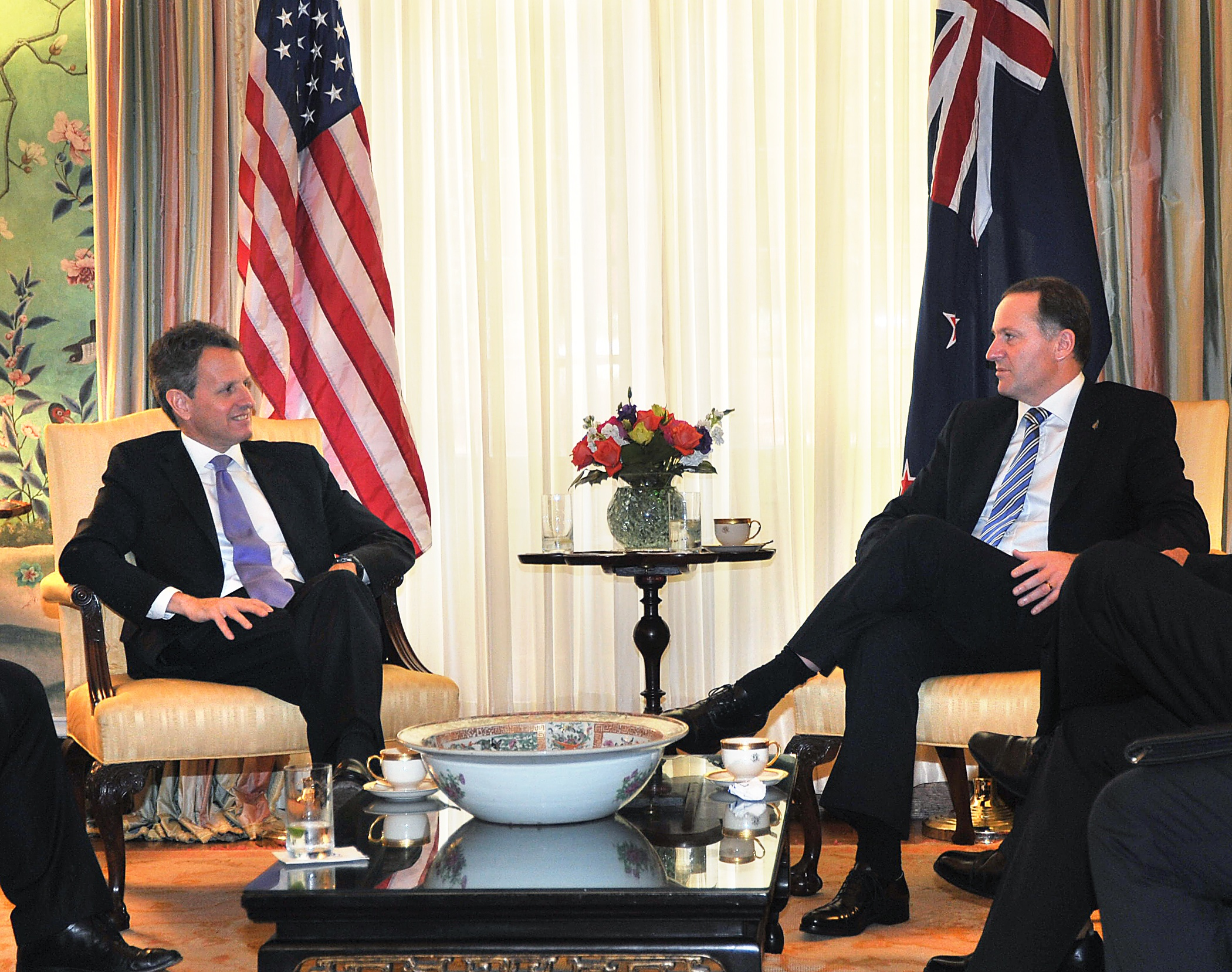
U.S. Secretary of the Treasury Tim Geithner met with New Zealand Prime Minister John Key at Blair House, on 21 July 2011.

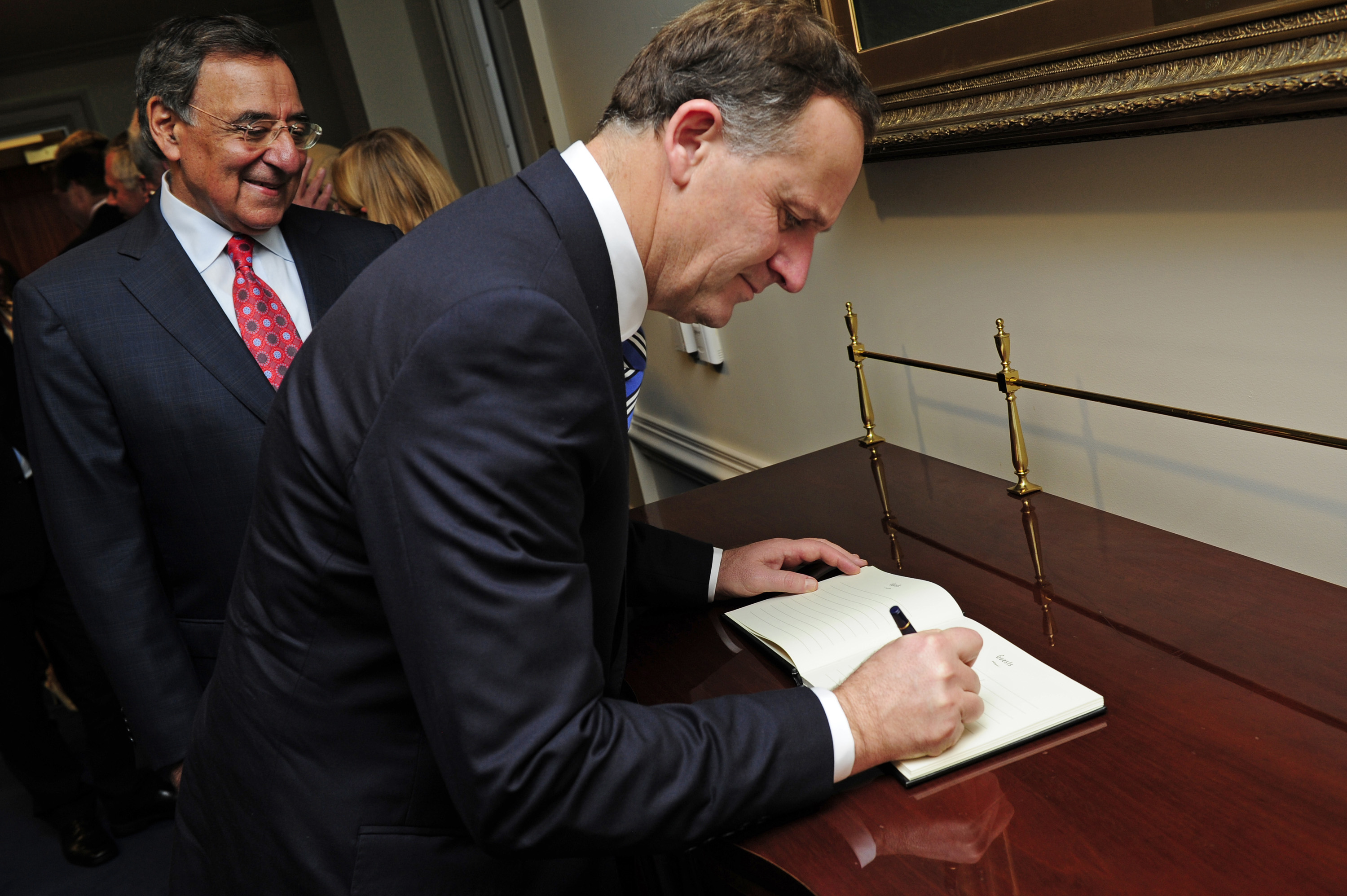
U.S. Secretary of Defense Leon Panetta looks on as New Zealand Prime Minister John Key signs an official guest book before a meeting in the Pentagon on 21 July 2011.

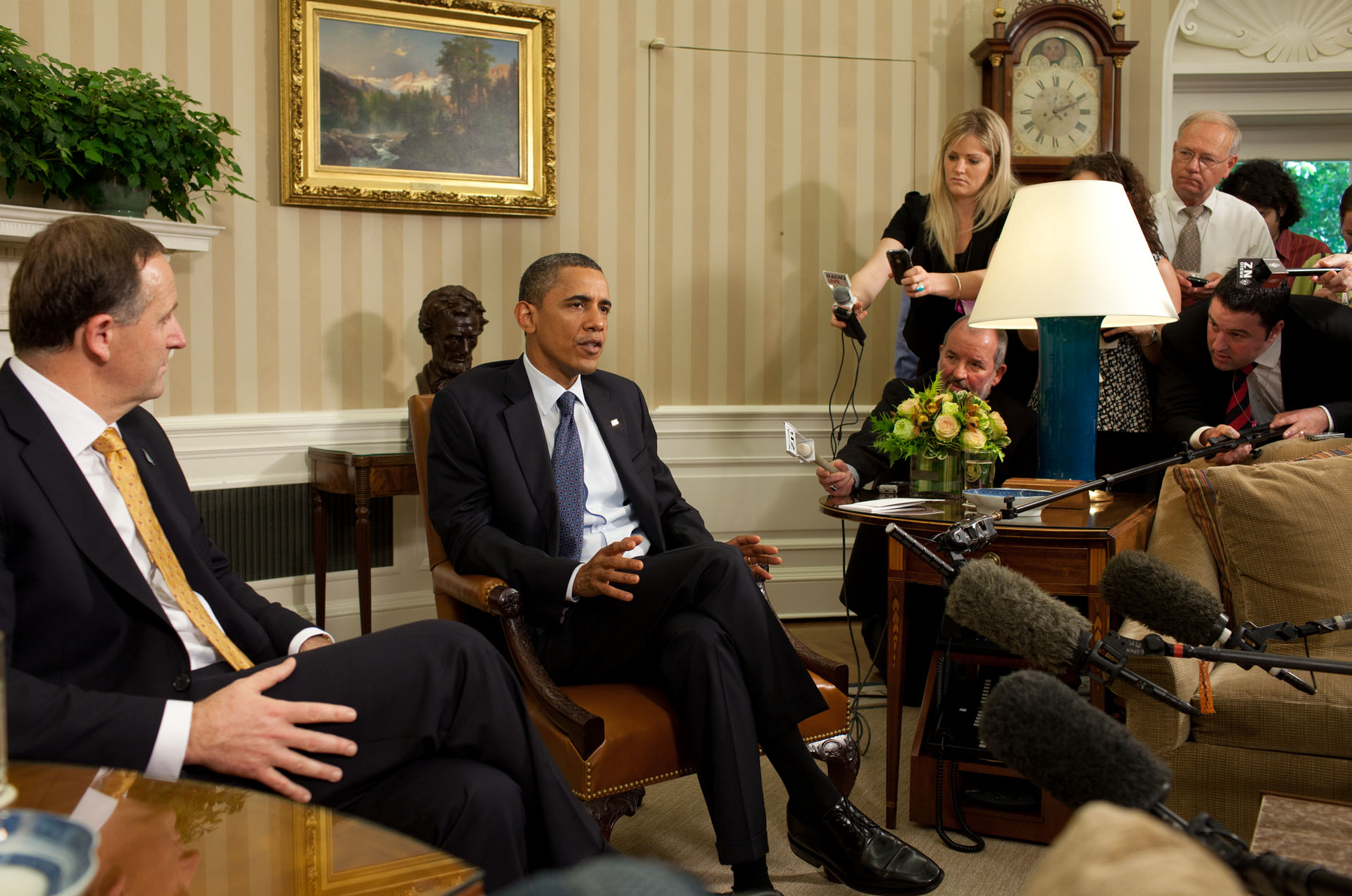
U.S. President Obama and New Zealand Prime Minister John Key make a statement to the press conference following their meeting at the Oval Office, on 22 July 2011.

- 21–22 July – New Zealand Prime Minister John Key visits Washington, D.C. in the United States to meet with U.S. President Barack Obama. During their meeting at the White House, Prime Minister John Key and U.S. President Obama send their condolences to the people of Norway following the tragic terrorist attacks in Oslo, and are a reminder that the entire world must work together to prevent future attacks since World War II.

=== August ===
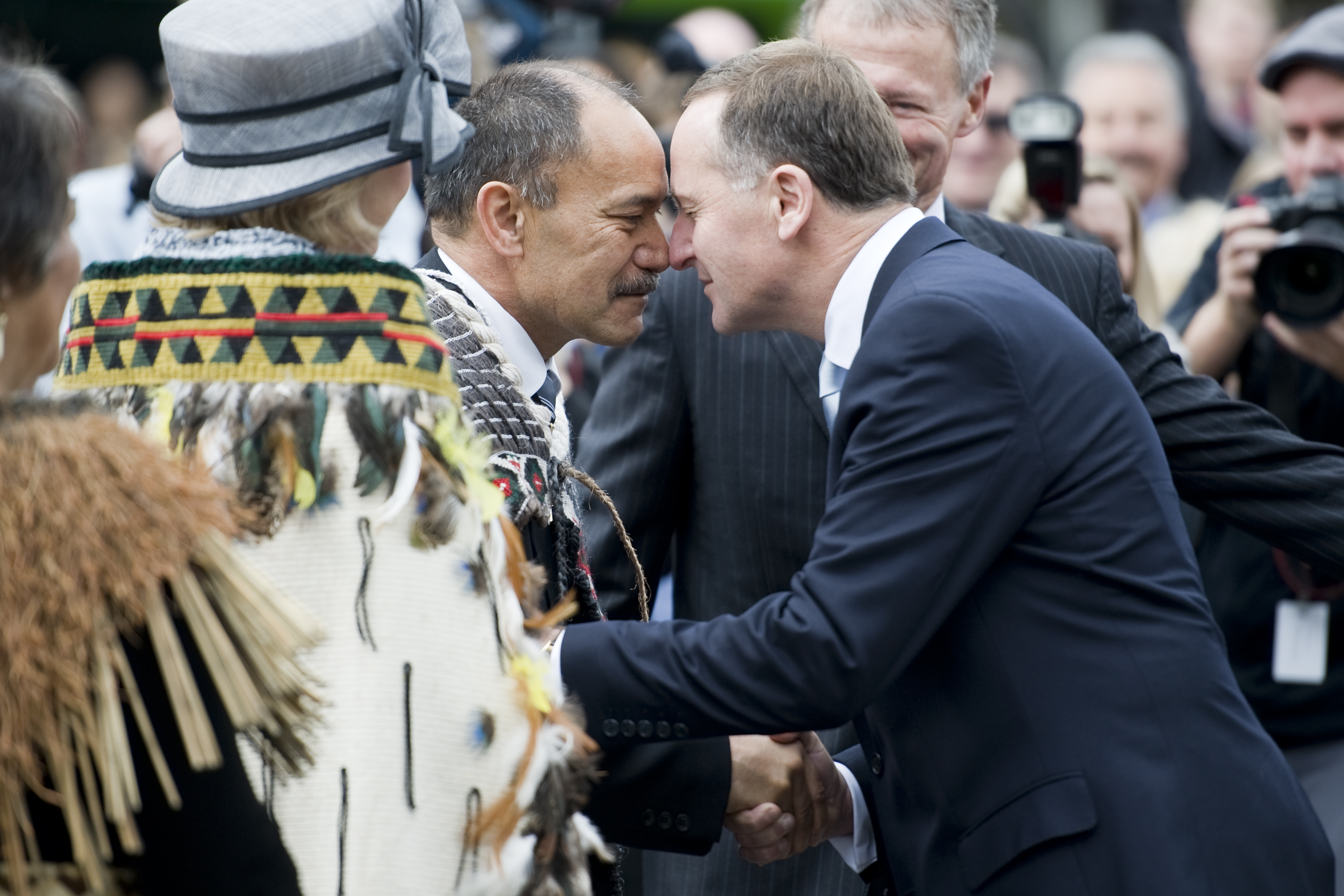
Governor-General Sir Jerry Mateparae performs a hongi with the New Zealand Prime Minister John Key at his swearing-in ceremony outside the parliament, on 31 August 2011.

- 15 August – The largest cold snap in fifty years causes widespread snow on both the North and South Islands, causing disruption to power supplies and the closures of roads and Wellington International Airport.
- 31 August – Lieutenant General Sir Jerry Mateparae is sworn in as New Zealand's 20th Governor-General, replacing Sir Anand Satyanand.

=== September ===
- 9 September – The Rugby World Cup begins, the first time the event has been held in New Zealand since 1987. New Zealand playing Tonga at Eden Park, Auckland in the opening game, which was marred with overcrowding problems on the Auckland Waterfront fan zone and transport failures resulting in some spectators missing the game.
- 28 September – A New Zealand Special Air Service soldier dies fighting in Afghanistan, the second in two months.
- 30 September – Credit agencies Fitch and Standard & Poor's both downgrade New Zealand's long-term credit rating from AA+ to AA.

=== October ===
- 5 October – The container ship MV Rena runs aground on the Astrolabe Reef 12 nmi (22 km) off the coast of Tauranga, causing a large oil spill into the Bay of Plenty.
- 11–13 October – The Tauranga oil spill becomes the nation's worst maritime environmental disaster, as tonnes of fuel oil from the MV Rena washes ashore near Tauranga and containers begin to fall off the damaged ship.
- 23 October – The Rugby World Cup concludes, with the New Zealand All Blacks winning the tournament and the Webb Ellis Cup after defeating France 8–7 in the final at Eden Park, Auckland.
- 25–30 October – Natural gas supply to the Upper North Island is severely cut back after a major leak is found in the Maui high pressure gas line in northern Taranaki, affecting 255,000 consumers including many several major industrial users, thermal power stations, dairy factories, hospitals and businesses.
- 29 October – Christchurch's temporary container mall Re:START opens.

=== November ===
- 10 November – Pike River Mine disaster: The Department of Labour files 25 criminal charges in relation to the disaster.
- 26 November – 2011 general election and 2011 voting system referendum:
  - The National Party, led by incumbent Prime Minister John Key, wins a plurality of 60 seats in the general election, and indicates he will work with ACT, United Future and the Māori Party to form a minority government.
  - On advance vote counts, the existing Mixed Member Proportional (MMP) voting system gains the majority of the vote, and will be kept to elect the Parliament.

=== December ===
- 10 December – Official results for the 26 November general election and voting system referendum are released:
  - The National Party is confirmed to hold a plurality of the votes and seats. With confidence and supply agreements with ACT New Zealand and United Future confirmed, National announces it will form a minority government with a one-seat majority, returning the Fifth National Government to a second term in office.
  - Full results of the referendum on the voting system confirm that the Mixed Member Proportional voting system, with 57.8% of the vote, will be kept but will be reviewed. The First Past the Post voting system gains the most votes for the preferred alternative voting system.
- 11 December – The National Party signs a confidence and supply agreement with the Maori Party, extending its majority to govern to seven seats (64 seats to 57).
- 13 December – A fault disconnects Huntly Power Station from the national grid at 12:38pm, resulting in 200,000 customers across the North Island losing power as Transpower employs load shedding to prevent a cascade failure of the North Island electricity network. Electricity is gradually restored to customers as reserve generation comes online to replace Huntly.
- 14 December – A state of emergency is declared in the Nelson and Tasman regions after nearly 200 millimetres (7.9 in) of rain falls in the 2011 Golden Bay and Nelson floods in 24 hours.
- 20–21 December – The 50th New Zealand Parliament is opened, with members elected at the 26 November general election being sworn in and the Governor-General delivering the Speech from the Throne.
- 23 December – A magnitude 5.8 and a magnitude 6.0 earthquake strike Christchurch at 1:58pm and 3:18pm respectively, causing damage, liquefaction, minor injuries, and majorly disrupting shopping and travel in the lead-up to the Christmas holiday period. A state of emergency is declared in Canterbury but later stood down.

=== Holidays and observances ===
- 6 February – Waitangi Day
- 18 March – Canterbury Earthquake Commemoration Day (observed in some parts of Canterbury)
- 25 April – ANZAC Day
- 6 June – Queen's Birthday Monday
- 24 October – Labour Day

=== Undated ===
- CamperMate mobile application is launched.

== Arts and literature ==
=== Films ===
- The Devil's Rock (Horror film)
- Love Birds
- My Wedding and Other Secrets
- The Adventures of Tintin: Secret of the Unicorn (Family / Adventure film)
- Operation 8: Deep in the Forest (Documentary)
- The Most Fun You Can Have Dying
- Dreamer by Design

=== Performing arts ===
- Benny Award presented by the Variety Artists Club of New Zealand to Shane Hales.

=== Television ===
- C4 to be renamed FOUR

== Sport ==
=== Events ===
- 3 October – The New Zealand Warriors are defeated 10–24 in the 2011 NRL grand final against the Manly Sea Eagles in Sydney.
- 23 October – The All Blacks win the 2011 Rugby World Cup, defeating France 8–7 in the final at Eden Park, Auckland.

=== Horse racing ===
==== Harness racing ====
- New Zealand Trotting Cup – Henry Greaves

=== Shooting ===
- Ballinger Belt – Richard Rowlands (Malvern)

=== Rugby Union ===
The 2011 Rugby World Cup competition is to be held in New Zealand in September and October.

== Births ==
- 1 May – Manukura, white North Island brown kiwi

== Deaths ==
=== January ===
- 19 January – Bryce Postles, cricketer (born 1931)
- 21 January – Wally Hughes, association football player and coach (born 1934)

=== February ===
- 12 February
  - Kevin Barry Sr., boxing coach (born 1936)
  - Frank Whitten, actor (born 1942)
- 15 February – Dame Judith Binney, historian and author (born 1940)
- 20 February – Bob McDowall, freshwater ichthyologist (born 1939)
- 22 February
  - Jo Giles, television personality and sportswoman (born 1950)
  - Amanda Hooper, field hockey representative (born 1980)

=== March ===
- 2 March – Anthony Brooke, formerly Rajah Muda of Sarawak (born 1912)
- 6 March – John Morton, zoologist (born 1923)
- 13 March
  - Yvonne du Fresne, writer (born 1929)
  - Ritchie Pickett, country singer (born 1955)
- 23 March – Zena Daysh, human ecologist (born 1914)
- 30 March – Denis McLean, diplomat, academic, author and civil servant (born 1930)

=== April ===
- 7 April – Pat Creedy, rugby union and rugby league player (born 1927)
- 9 April – Geoff Smale, sailor (born 1924)
- 10 April – Don Merton, conservationist (born 1939)
- 17 April – Ken Cumberland, geographer (born 1913)
- 20 April – Kerry Smith, actress and broadcaster (born 1953)
- 21 April – Stanley Callagher, rowing coxswain (born 1927)
- 22 April – Tim Eliott, actor (born 1935)
- 23 April – Ready Teddy, eventing horse (born 1987)
- 24 April – Colin Snedden, cricketer (born 1918)
- 28 April – Mike Imber, ornithologist (born 1940)

=== May ===
- 3 May – Paul Ackerley, hockey player and coach (born 1949)
- 9 May – Maurice Carter, property developer, politician, philanthropist (born 1917)
- 16 May – Ian Payne, cricketer (born 1921)
- 21 May – Martin Winch, guitarist (born 1949)

=== June ===
- 1 June – Trevor Howard-Hill, bibliographer (born 1933)
- 3 June
  - Nathaniel Millar, fencer (born 1915)
  - Jim Vivieaere, artist and art curator (born 1947)
- 4 June – Jeff Schofer, cricketer (born 1943)
- 6 June
  - Ted Jones, neuroscientist (born 1939)
  - Shrek, celebrity sheep (born 1994)
- 12 June – Geoffrey Fisken, World War II flying ace (born 1916)
- 16 June – Dorice Reid, Cook Island politician (born 1943)
- 29 June – Rosalie Carey, playwright, director, poet, actor, author (born 1921)

=== July ===
- 1 July – Harold Nelson, Olympic runner (born 1923)
- 5 July – Lesley Rowe, athlete (born 1929)
- 13 July – Dame Vivienne Boyd, community leader (born 1926)
- 16 July – Dame Kāterina Mataira, educator and Māori language proponent, co-founder of Kura Kaupapa Māori (born 1932)
- 19 July – Roy Meehan, Olympic wrestler (born 1931)
- 20 July
  - Graham Cowan, cricket umpire (born 1940)
  - Whetu Tirikatene-Sullivan, politician, longest-serving female member of the House of Representatives (1967–96) (born 1932)
- 21 July – Don Jowett, athlete (born 1931)
- 28 July – Joan de Hamel, children's author (born 1924)

=== August ===
- 5 August – Grahame Jarratt, rower (born 1929)
- 7 August – Nancy Wake, World War II special operative (born 1912)
- 14 August – Sir Paul Reeves, Anglican archbishop, Primate (1980–85), Governor-General (1985–90) (born 1932)
- 15 August
  - Eric Dempster, cricket player and umpire (born 1925)
  - Genesis Potini, chess player (born 1963)
- 17 August – Bill Robinson, seismic engineer (born 1938)
- 20 August – Russell Calvert, politician, mayor of Dunedin (1965–68) (born 1909)
- 21 August – Christine Cole Catley, journalist, publisher and author (born 1922)
- 24 August
  - Horlicks, Throroughbred racemare (foaled 1983)
  - Joyce McDougall, psychoanalyst (born 1920)
  - Graeme Moody, sports broadcaster (born 1951)
- 26 August
  - Gordon Crook, visual artist (born 1921)
  - Sylvia Siddell, painter, etcher, screenprinter (born 1941)

=== September ===
- 1 September
  - Maunga Emery, rugby union and rugby league player (born 1933)
  - Rex Orr, rugby union player (born 1932)
- 2 September – Allan Hubbard, businessman (born 1928)
- 4 September – Dana Wilson, rugby league player (born 1983)
- 7 September – Christopher Small, sociomusicologist (born 1927)
- 10 September – Ken Ruby, wrestler (born 1921)
- 20 September – Johannes La Grouw, architect, engineer, businessman (born 1913)
- 22 September – Whatumoana Paki, Māori elder, husband of Te Atairangikaahu and father of Tūheitia Paki (born 1927)
- 28 September – Leon Smith, soldier (born 1978)
- 29 September – Len Castle, potter (born 1924)
- 30 September – Alexander Grant, ballet dancer (born 1925)

=== October ===
- 3 October – Fraser Bergersen, plant biologist (born 1929)
- 13 October – Chris Doig, opera singer and sports administrator (born 1948)
- 23 October – Sir Frank Holmes, economist and government advisor (born 1924)
- 24 October – Sir Peter Siddell, painter (born 1935)
- 25 October – Vengeance of Rain, Thoroughbred racehorse (foaled 2000)
- 28 October – Roger Kerr, businessman and political campaigner, executive director of the New Zealand Business Roundtable (born 1945)
- 30 October – Richard Walls, politician and businessman, former MP for Dunedin North (1975–78), former Mayor of Dunedin (1989–95) (born 1937)

=== November ===
- 6 November – Allan Peachey, politician, MP for Tāmaki (2005–11) (born 1949)
- 10 November – Ted Bollard, plant physiologist, science administrator (born 1920)
- 12 November – Gavin Bornholdt, Olympic sailor (1976) (born 1947)
- 16 November
  - Bob Bell, politician (born 1929)
  - Lance Payne, cyclist (born 1933)
- 17 November
  - Peter Gwynne, actor (born c.1929)
  - Maurice Crow, weightlifter (born 1925)
- 19 November
  - David Bolstad, woodchopper (born 1969)
  - Russell Garcia, composer (born 1916)

=== December ===
- 4 December – Alamein Kopu, politician, former MP (1996–99) (born 1943)
- 7 December
  - Shona Bell, palaeontologist (born 1924)
  - Betty Flint, botanist (born 1909)
- 11 December – Phillip Cottrell, journalist (born 1968)
- 15 December
  - Jason Richards, motor racing driver (born 1976)
  - Carmen Rupe, transsexual entertainer (born 1936)
- 16 December – Pae Ruha, Māori leader (born 1931)
- 24 December – Tom Logan, water polo player, swimmer, dentist, naval officer (born 1927)
- 28 December – Volksraad, Thoroughbred sire (foaled 1988)
- 30 December – John Hewitt, local-body politician (born c. 1943)

== See also ==
- List of years in New Zealand
- Timeline of New Zealand history
- History of New Zealand
- Military history of New Zealand
- Timeline of the New Zealand environment
- Timeline of New Zealand's links with Antarctica
