= Schofer =

Schofer or Schöfer is a German surname. Notable people with the surname include:

- Jeff Schofer (born 1943), New Zealand cricketer
- Joseph Schofer, American civil engineer
- Phil Schofer (born 1948), New Zealand cricketer
