= Dana Wilson =

Dana Wilson may refer to:

- Dana Wilson (composer) (born 1946), American composer, jazz pianist, and teacher
- Dana Wilson (rugby league) (1983–2011), New Zealand rugby league player
- Dana Wilson (actress) (1949–2015), Australian actress
- Dana Broccoli (1922–2004), formerly Wilson, American actress and novelist
