= Phillip Cottrell =

British-born New Zealand journalist

Phillip Cottrell (5 June 1968 – 11 December 2011) was a British-born journalist. Phillip was born in Enfield, United Kingdom, but he grew up in Cheshunt, Hertfordshire, where he was a pupil at Cheshunt School. From 1986 to 1989, Phillip studied for a Bachelor of Arts Degree in Media Studies, at what was the Polytechnic of Central London, currently the University of Westminster.

Phillip worked as a broadcast radio journalist for BBC Scotland based in Glasgow, having previously worked in London. In 2006, Phillip left the United Kingdom, and immigrated to New Zealand, where he took a position at Radio New Zealand. In 2011, he was a news bulletin editor.

He was one of the founding members of a gay immigrant group, "Queers Gone Kiwi.".

Phillip was assaulted in a street attack on Boulcott Street in central Wellington, New Zealand, on 10 December 2011, less than 15 minutes after leaving the Radio New Zealand studios, where he had finished an overnight shift. He died from his injuries at Wellington Hospital on 11 December 2011, at the age of 43 without regaining consciousness. Although Phillip suffered from a degenerative bone disorder, this did not contribute to his death. Two teenagers were charged in connection with his murder.

Phillip's funeral took place on 16 December 2011, in Wellington, New Zealand. On 21 January 2012, a memorial service was held for Phillip in Long Sutton, Lincolnshire, United Kingdom.

The two men charged with his murder went on trial in December 2012, and both pleaded not guilty. A number of Radio New Zealand staff were due to give evidence. In December 2012, Nicho Allan Waipuka was found guilty of manslaughter while Manuel Renera Robinson was acquitted. Only at sentencing did Waipuka's violent history and the fact that he had almost been sentenced to an intensive supervision sentence for charges including assault and threatening to kill just 17 days prior to his assault on Phillip Cottrell come out. Sue Hollow's (Phillip Cottrell's sister) made a victim impact statement.

Phillip Cottrell's family, Wellington Central Baptist Church, other local residents, churches, businesses, the gay and lesbian community, and representatives of Wellington Māori iwi joined to dedicate a memorial bench and garden in Boulcott Street near where Phillip was assaulted as a tribute and to clearly say that the entire community abhors what happened.
