= CamperMate =

- Founded: 2011
- Founder: Adam Hutchinson
- Products: Mobile application for travel
- Website: campermate.co.nz

CamperMate is a mobile application used for travelling around New Zealand and Australia. The app is free and uses GPS to find nearby Points Of Interest (POI) such as public toilets, dump-stations, accommodation, rubbish bins, local travel tips and more.

CamperMate was launched in 2011 during the Rugby World Cup when an estimated 133,000 tourists visited New Zealand, many travelling in campervans. The app collects data from official sources, and also crowd sources new locations; once approved, these are added to the app.
