= Graeme Moody =

New Zealand sports broadcaster

Graeme Moody (August 1951 – 24 August 2011) was a New Zealand sports broadcaster. He worked for the Newstalk ZB and Radio Sport networks for 35 years covering a range of major events, including the Olympic Games, Rugby World Cups, Commonwealth Games and America's Cup yachting. Moody drowned in a surfing accident in Australia on 24 August 2011, one week after his 60th birthday.
