= Jeff Schofer =

New Zealand cricketer (1943–2011)

Personal information
- Full name: Jeffrey William James Schofer
- Born: 26 March 1943 (age 83); Lower Hutt, New Zealand
- Died: 4 June 2011 (aged 68); Thames, New Zealand
- Batting: Right-handed
- Role: Batter
- Relatives: Phil Schofer (brother)

Domestic team information
- Years: Team
- 1969/70: Wellington

Career statistics
Competition	First-class
Matches	2
Runs scored	96
Batting average	24.00
100s/50s	0/0
Top score	43
Catches/stumpings	1/0
- Source: Cricinfo, 16 November 2026

Jeffrey William James Schofer (26 March 1943 – 4 June 2011) was a New Zealand cricketer. He played in two first-class matches for Wellington in 1969/70. A top-order batsman, he batted at number 3 in his debut first-class match against Canterbury at the Basin Reserve in Wellington, scoring 22 before being run out in the first innings, and 3 runs in the second innings. In his second first-class match, Schofer played as an opening batsman against Auckland at Eden Park, scoring 43 in the first innings before once again being run out, and 28 in the second innings.

Schofer began playing senior club cricket at Taitā, before moving to the Karori club where he played 110 matches over 12 seasons and scoring 5138 runs at an average of 32.93. He also played senior club rugby union for Taitā, and later coached the Taitā senior rugby team.

Schofer's brother, Phil Schofer, also played first-class cricket for Wellington.

Schofer died in Thames on 4 June 2011, at the age of 68.

== See also ==
- List of Wellington representative cricketers
