= Dana Wilson (rugby league) =

Cook Islands international rugby league footballer (1983-2011)

Jonathan (Dana) Wilson
Personal information
- Full name: Jonathan Pareu Pera Takatatia Wilson
- Born: 22 May 1983 Auckland, New Zealand
- Died: 4 September 2011 (aged 28) Burtonwood, England

Playing information
- Position: Prop
Club
Years	Team	Pld	T	G	FG	P
2005	Oldham	22	3	0	0	12
2006–08	Leigh Centurions	66	11	0	0	44
2009	Halifax	18
2010–11	Swinton Lions	44	12	0	0	48
	Total	150	26	0	0	104
Representative
Years	Team	Pld	T	G	FG	P
2006	Cook Islands	2	0	0	0	0
- Source: As of 30 July 2021

Jonathan "Dana" Wilson (22 May 1983 – 4 September 2011) was a New Zealand professional rugby league footballer who represented the Cook Islands.

== Playing career ==
Wilson played lower grades for Manly for a season before moving to England in 2005. He played for Oldham Bears, Leigh and Halifax before joining Swinton in 2009. He scored the match-winning try for Leigh in the 2006 Northern Rail Cup Final against Hull Kingston Rovers.

He was a key member of Swinton Lions' promotion-winning team in Championship 1 in 2011.

== Representative career ==
Wilson represented New Zealand Under‑16's and Under‑18's before switching his allegiance to the Cook Islands, where his mother was born (his dad was born in Samoa).

Wilson played in the Pacific Cup, toured Fiji and played for the Cook Islands in the 2006 World Cup qualifiers.

== Personal life ==
Wilson lived in Newton-le-Willows, Merseyside, England, with his wife Kirsten and their three children.

== Death ==
Wilson was killed in a car accident on Forshaw Lane, Burtonwood, Cheshire, England, on 4 September 2011.
