= Phil Schofer =

New Zealand cricketer (born 1948)

Personal information
- Born: 22 April 1948 (age 78); Lower Hutt, New Zealand
- Source: Cricinfo, 27 October 2020

Phil Schofer (born 22 April 1948) is a New Zealand cricketer. He played in two first-class matches for Wellington in 1983/84.

== See also ==
- List of Wellington representative cricketers
