= New Zealand cricket team in Australia in 1913–14 =

International cricket tour

The New Zealand cricket team toured Australia from early December 1913 to late January 1914, playing four first-class matches against state teams and five other matches.

== The team ==
Three of New Zealand’s leading batsmen, David Collins, Harold Lusk and Arthur Sims, were unavailable. The provincial cricket associations were asked to submit the names of suitable players from their regions. Out of 40 players nominated, 14 were eventually chosen.

- Dan Reese (captain)
- Joe Bennett
- Charles Boxshall
- Tom Carlton
- Lancelot Hemus
- Rupert Hickmott
- Billy Patrick
- Charles Robinson
- Don Sandman
- Nessie Snedden
- Robert Somervell
- Leslie Taylor
- Henry Tattersall
- Bertie Tuckwell

== Tour matches ==
The New Zealanders won the first first-class match against Queensland, lost to New South Wales and Victoria, and drew with South Australia.

First match

12-13 December 1913
(2-day match)
Scorecard

New Zealand	v	Northern New South Wales
228; Rupert Hickmott 80; A.C. Lawrie 5/37		120; R. Fawcett 69*; Don Sandman 3/23
285/7d Bertie Tuckwell 84; A.C. Lawrie 2/59		90; M. McKay 24; Don Sandman 8/29

New Zealand won by 303 runs
Albion Ground, West Maitland

- New Zealand won the toss and decided to bat

Second match

14-15 December 1913
(2-day match)
Scorecard

Northern New South Wales	v	New Zealand
86; E. Mitchell 29; Tom Carlton 5/21		232; Billy Patrick 51; P. Berrie 4/75
100; P. Mills 29; Don Sandman 6/50

New Zealanders won by an innings and 46 runs
Glen Innes Showground, Glen Innes

- Toss not known

Third match

12-22 December 1913
(3-day match)
Scorecard

New Zealand	v	Queensland
89 (31 overs); Rupert Hickmott 19; Charles Barstow 5/47 (16 overs)		124 (35.2 overs); Alan Marshal 47; Dan Reese 7/53 (17.2 overs)
161 (45.3 overs); Billy Patrick 27; Charles Robinson 27; Charles Barstow 5/45 (11.3 overs)		114 (44.2 overs); Alan Marshal 66*; Don Sandman 5/41 (17.2)

New Zealand won by 12 runs
Woolloongabba, Brisbane
Umpires: William Carvosso and Andrew Horrigan

- Queensland won the toss and decided to field
- 21 December was a rest day

Fourth match

26-27 December 1913
(3-day match)
Scorecard

New Zealand	v	New South Wales
161 (42.2 overs); Don Sandman 53*; Charlie Kelleway 7/53 (21 overs)		513 (96.5 overs); Charlie Macartney 142; Charles Robinson 4/129 (21.5 overs)
105 (34.5 overs); Don Sandman 33; Arthur Mailey 4/41 (15 overs)

New South Wales won by an innings and 247 runs
Sydney Cricket Ground, Sydney
Umpires: Wally French and John Gairns

- New South Wales won the toss and decided to field
- The match was scheduled for three days but completed in two

Fifth match

31 December 1913-1 January 1914
(2-day match)
Scorecard

Southern New South Wales	v	New Zealand
142; O. Edis 54; Charles Robinson 5/33		230; Bertie Tuckwell 63; W.C. Tickner 5/86
169; L. Thompson 84; Don Sandman 3/55		82/2; Bertie Tuckwell 44*; J.C. Tickner 1/7

New Zealand won by 8 wickets
Goulburn Sportsground, Goulburn

- Toss not known

Sixth match

3-5 January 1914
(2-day match)
Scorecard

New Zealand	v	Albury and Border
378; Nessie Snedden 89; D. Kenna 5/128		75; E.J. White 19*; Nessie Snedden 3/9
		176 f/o E. Stewart 33; Dan Reese 4/40

New Zealand won by an innings and 127 runs
Albury Sports Ground, Albury

- Toss not known
- 4 January was a rest day

Seventh match

9-10 January 1914
(timeless match)
Scorecard

New Zealand	v	Victoria
141 (50.1 overs); Dan Reese 47; Allie Lampard 5/41 (20 overs)		439 (84.4 overs); Percy Heather 65; Don Sandman 4/103 (21 overs)
188 (56.3 overs); Nessie Snedden 51; Carl Willis 2/10 (1.3 overs)

Victoria won by an innings and 110 runs
Melbourne Cricket Ground, Melbourne
Umpires: Edward Barrass and Bob Crockett

- New Zealanders won the toss and decided to bat

Eighth match

16-19 January 1914
(3-day match)
Scorecard

New Zealand	v	South Australia
362 (78 overs); Dan Reese 96; Leonard Howard 3/82 (19 overs)		433 (99.1 overs); Nip Pellew 94; Charles Robinson 3/72 (15.1 overs)
287/6d (78 overs); Dan Reese 130*; Leonard Howard 3/66 (17 overs)		161/3 (37 overs); Andrew Smith 74*; Charles Robinson 2/45 (7 overs)

Match drawn
Adelaide Oval, Adelaide
Umpires: F.J.C. Thomas and J.G. Wagstaff

- New Zealanders won the toss and decided to bat
- 18 January was a rest day

Ninth match

21-22 January 1914
(2-day match)
Scorecard

Melbourne Cricket Club	v	New Zealand
251 (72 overs); Horace Sandford 52; Dan Reese 6/66 (22 overs)		209 (63.2 overs); Henry Tattersall 49*; Leonard Mullett 4/58 (16.2 overs)
1/130d (31 overs); Colin McKenzie 68*; Nessie Snedden 1/35 (8 overs)		152/3 (32 overs); Lancelot Hemus 71*; Bert Ironmonger 2/56 (13 overs)

Match drawn
Melbourne Cricket Ground, Melbourne

- Toss not known

== Other sources ==
- Don Neely & Richard Payne, Men in White: The History of New Zealand International Cricket, 1894–1985, Moa, Auckland, 1986, pp. 53–56.
- Dan Reese, Was It All Cricket?, George Allen & Unwin, London, 1948, pp. 389–401.
