= Hickmott =

Hickmott is a surname. Notable people with the surname include:

- Adrian Hickmott (born 1972), Australian footballer
- Allerton C. Hickmott (1895–1977), American book collector
- Edward Hickmott (1850–1934), English cricketer
- Henry Hickmott (1853–1931), Australian farmer and politician
- Michelle Hickmott (born 1985), English footballer
- Peter Hickmott (1954–2015), Australian footballer
- Robert Hickmott (born 1969), Australian footballer and horse trainer
- Rupert Hickmott (1894–1916), New Zealand cricketer
- William Hickmott (1893–1968), English cricketer
