= International cricket in 1925–26 =

International cricket season

The 1925–26 international cricket season was from September 1925 to April 1926. There were no any major tournament held during this period.

== Season overview ==
International tours
Start date	Home team	Away team	Results [Matches]			
Start date	Home team	Away team	Test	ODI	FC	LA
4 December 1925	Australia	New Zealand	—	—	1–0 [6]	—
12 February 1926	Ceylon	India	—	—	1–0 [1]	—
10 March 1926	Jamaica	Marylebone	—	—	0–1 [3]	—

== December ==
=== New Zealand in Australia ===
First-class Series
No.	Date	Home captain	Away captain	Venue	Result
Match 1	4–7 December	(Queensland) Leo O'Connor	Bill Patrick	The Gabba, Brisbane	Queensland by an innings and 92 runs
Match 2	18–21 December	(Victoria (state)) Edgar Mayne	Bill Patrick	Melbourne Cricket Ground, Melbourne	Match drawn
Match 3	26–29 December	(South Australia) Vic Richardson	Bill Patrick	Adelaide Oval, Adelaide	Match drawn
Match 4	1–4 January	(New South Wales) Andrew Ratcliffe	Bill Patrick	Sydney Cricket Ground, Sydney	Match drawn
Match 5	8–9 January	(New South Wales) Eric Barbour	Bill Patrick	No. 1 Sports Ground, Newcastle	Match drawn
Match 6	11–12 January	(New South Wales) Leon Moore	Tom Lowry	Showgrounds, West Maitland	Match drawn

== February ==
=== Bombay in Ceylon ===
First-class match
No.	Date	Home captain	Away captain	Venue	Result
Match	12–13 February	FRR Brooke	Walter Lucas	Nondescripts Cricket Club Ground, Colombo	(Dominion of Ceylon) Roockwood's Celyon XI by 7 wickets

== March ==
=== MCC in the West Indies ===
First-class match
No.	Date	Home captain	Away captain	Venue	Result
Match 1	10–12 March	Charles Morrison	Freddie Calthorpe	Sabina Park, Kingston	Marylebone by 5 wickets
Match 2	13–16 March	Charles Morrison	Freddie Calthorpe	Melbourne Park, Kingston	Match drawn
Match 3	18–20 March	Karl Nunes	Freddie Calthorpe	Sabina Park, Kingston	Match drawn
