= Charles Boxshall =

New Zealand cricketer

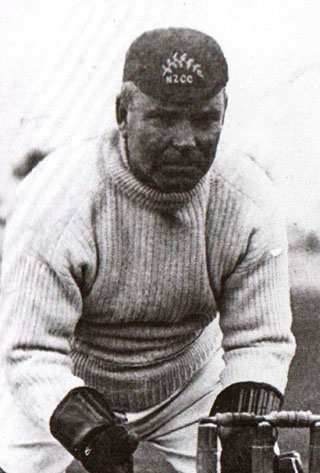

Personal information
- Full name: Charles Boxshall
- Born: 7 July 1862; Brighton, Victoria, Australia
- Died: 13 November 1924 (aged 62); Balmain, New South Wales, Australia
- Batting: Left-handed
- Role: Wicket-keeper

Domestic team information
- Years: Team
- 1897/98–1914/15: Canterbury

Career statistics
Competition	First-class
Matches	65
Runs scored	1027
Batting average	12.22
100s/50s	0/0
Top score	46
Balls bowled	–
Wickets	–
Bowling average	–
5 wickets in innings	–
10 wickets in match	–
Best bowling	–
Catches/stumpings	80/45
- Source: Cricinfo, 19 November 2014

Charles Boxshall (7 July 1862 – 13 November 1924) was an Australian-born New Zealand wicket-keeper who played first-class cricket from 1898 to 1915, and played 12 times for New Zealand in the days before New Zealand played Test cricket.

== Early life and career ==
Boxshall was one of the seven sons (and three daughters) of Thomas Boxshall, who was foreman of the Carlton Gardens in Melbourne. He played club cricket in Melbourne before moving to Christchurch in the late 1890s. He made his first-class debut for Canterbury in February 1898 at the age of 35, opening the batting and top-scoring with 25 in his first innings. In two matches in 1898-99 he made six stumpings off five different Canterbury bowlers.

== Playing for New Zealand ==
After those three matches Boxshall was selected to tour Australia with the New Zealand team in 1898-99 when Arnold Williams was unavailable. He became the regular New Zealand wicket-keeper, playing in 12 of New Zealand's next 14 matches. His last matches for New Zealand came on the tour of Australia in 1913-14, when at 51 he was still the country's first choice as wicket-keeper. He was replaced later that season, when Australia toured New Zealand, by James Condliffe.

"Short and rotund," said Dick Brittenden, "he wore an ample white moustache, but as a wicket-keeper he was incredibly quick, so quick that there were some who said he could not do what he did and do it legally. A left-hander and a willing hitter, he was always given a tremendous reception when he came out to bat." He often made useful runs in the lower order. In 1902–03, when Lord Hawke's XI thrashed South Island by an innings and 130 runs, Boxshall top-scored in each innings for South Island, with 15 and 40. In 1908–09 against Otago, after Canterbury had lost their first nine wickets for 108, he came in at number 11 and put on 98 for the last wicket with Sydney Orchard. He retired from first-class cricket in March 1915 at the age of 52.

Although he did not begin his first-class career until he was 35, Boxshall became the first cricketer to play 50 first-class matches for a New Zealand provincial side. He is also the oldest New Zealand first-class player, at 52 years 189 days on the last day of his last match.

== Later life ==
In New Zealand, Boxshall ran the Booklovers' Library in Christchurch's Cathedral Square. When he returned to Australia in the early 1920s he lived in Sydney and had business interests in New Guinea oil.

An obituary appreciation in the Christchurch Evening Post said he was "the most brilliant wicket-keeper ever seen in New Zealand, being quite as good as any man who has toured here with overseas teams". In 1936 the New Zealand cricket historian Tom Reese declared that Boxshall was the greatest New Zealand wicket-keeper.
