= Condliffe =

Condliffe is a surname. Notable people with the surname include:

- James Condliffe (1888–1945), New Zealand cricketer
- John B. Condliffe (1891–1981), New Zealand economist, professor, and economic consultant
