= Les Taylor =

Les Taylor may refer to:

- Les Taylor (basketball), American basketball player
- Les Taylor (cricketer) (born 1953), English cricketer
- Les Taylor (footballer) (born 1956), English footballer
- Les Taylor (singer) (born 1948), American musician of the band Exile
- Les Squizzy Taylor (1888–1927), Australian gangster
- Lesley Taylor (judge), a judge of the Supreme Court of Victoria

== See also ==
- Leslie Taylor (1894–1977), New Zealand cricketer
- Lesley Taylor, producer of Caillou's Holiday Movie
- Taylor (surname)
