= Charles Robinson (New Zealand cricketer) =

New Zealand cricketer

Personal information
- Full name: Charles Walter Robinson
- Born: 28 March 1892; Wellington, New Zealand
- Died: 22 May 1947 (aged 55); Lower Hutt, New Zealand
- Batting: Right-handed
- Bowling: Right-arm fast-medium

Domestic team information
- Years: Team
- 1911-12 to 1914-15: Wellington

Career statistics
Competition	First-class
Matches	14
Runs scored	376
Batting average	16.34
100s/50s	0/0
Top score	45
Balls bowled	1846
Wickets	53
Bowling average	24.30
5 wickets in innings	1
10 wickets in match	0
Best bowling	5/63
Catches/stumpings	6/0
- Source: Cricket Archive, 1 January 2015

Charles Walter Robinson (28 March 1892 – 22 May 1947) was a cricketer who played first-class cricket for Wellington from 1912 to 1915 and played for New Zealand in the days before New Zealand played Test cricket.

== Early career ==
Charles Robinson was a fast bowler – "the fastest bowler New Zealand had so far produced" according to Dan Reese – a hard-hitting lower-order batsman and a fine fieldsman. He took "a nice easy run of about twelve yards" to the wicket. He made his first-class debut for Wellington in 1911-12 at the age of 18, and after one more first-class match in 1912-13 he was selected to tour Australia with the New Zealand team in 1913-14, although in his two matches he had bowled only 173 balls and taken three wickets for 80. Batting at number eight, he had scored 14, 31 not out, 22 and 45 (top score in a losing side).

== Playing for New Zealand ==
In the first match of the tour of Australia, Reese and Don Sandman dismissed Queensland cheaply twice to win. In the other three state matches Robinson was the most successful bowler, and finished the tour with 14 wickets at an average of 28.28. Reese, his captain on the tour, said, "Robinson had a knee that would not stand up to a long, hard day on Australian wickets, and he had to be used sparingly, yet he got through a surprising amount of work. He was our best bowler in the big matches at Sydney, Melbourne and Adelaide; his extra pace made him a better bowler than Bennett on Australian wickets." The manager, Syd Orchard, said Robinson was the side's best bowler, "[taking] wickets where others of the team were not so effective".

He was one of only four New Zealanders who played in both matches against the visiting Australians later that season, taking five wickets.

== Later career ==
In a senior club match for Central at Basin Reserve in November 1914 Robinson scored 101 in only 50 minutes.

He took his best first-class figures of 5 for 63 (followed by 3 for 83 in the second innings) for Wellington against Auckland in 1914-15. He finished the season with 19 wickets in three matches at 21.00. He was only 22, but they were his last first-class matches. He was the leading wicket-taker in Wellington club cricket in 1914-15, with 51 at 13.56.

He served overseas with the 34th Reinforcements Canterbury Infantry Regiment, C Company, in World War I.

Robinson worked in the Post and Telegraph Department. He died aged 55 in May 1947 after a short illness, just before he was due to retire. He was survived by a daughter and two sons. His wife Annie Winifred had died in March 1937.
