= International cricket in 1924–25 =

International cricket season

The 1924–25 international cricket season was from September 1924 to April 1925.

== Season overview ==
International tours
| Start date | Home team | Away team | Results [Matches] | | | |
| Start date | Home team | Away team | Test | ODI | FC | LA |
|---|---|---|---|---|---|---|
| 19 December 1924 | Australia | England | 4–1 [5] | — | — | — |
| 20 March 1925 | New Zealand | Victoria | — | — | 0–1 [2] | — |

== December ==
=== England in Australia ===
The Ashes Test series
| No. | Date | Home captain | Away captain | Venue | Result |
|---|---|---|---|---|---|
| Test 158 | 19–27 December | Herbie Collins | Arthur Gilligan | Sydney Cricket Ground, Sydney | Australia by 193 runs |
| Test 159 | 1–8 January | Herbie Collins | Arthur Gilligan | Melbourne Cricket Ground, Melbourne | Australia by 81 runs |
| Test 160 | 16–23 February | Herbie Collins | Arthur Gilligan | Adelaide Oval, Adelaide | Australia by 11 runs |
| Test 161 | 13–18 March | Herbie Collins | Arthur Gilligan | Melbourne Cricket Ground, Melbourne | England by an innings and 29 runs |
| Test 162 | 27 Feb–4 March | Herbie Collins | Arthur Gilligan | Sydney Cricket Ground, Sydney | Australia by 307 runs |

== March ==
=== Victoria in New Zealand ===
First-class series
| No. | Date | Home captain | Away captain | Venue | Result |
|---|---|---|---|---|---|
| Match 1 | 20–24 March | Bill Patrick | Edgar Mayne | Basin Reserve, Wellington | Victoria by 6 wickets |
| Match 2 | 27–30 March | Bill Patrick | Edgar Mayne | Jade Stadium, Christchurch | Match drawn |
