= William Carlton =

William Carlton may refer to:

- Bill Carlton (1894–1949), Australian politician
- William Carlton (cricketer) (1876–1959), Australian cricketer
- William Carlton Woods (1891–1965), Canadian farmer and political figure
