= Bertie Tuckwell =

Australian cricketer

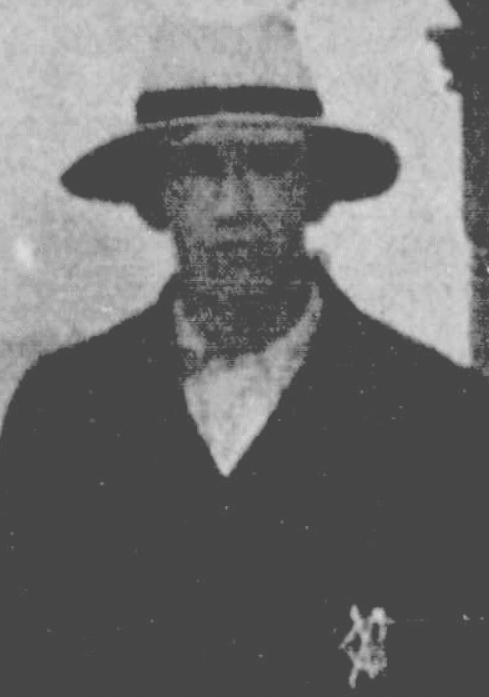

Personal information
- Full name: Bertie Joseph Tuckwell
- Born: 6 October 1882; Carlton, Victoria, Australia
- Died: 2 January 1943 (aged 60); Wellington, New Zealand
- Batting: Right-handed

Domestic team information
- Years: Team
- 1902/03–1903/04: Victoria
- 1912/13–1914/15: Otago
- 1917/18: Wellington

Career statistics
Competition	First-class
Matches	14
Runs scored	468
Batting average	18.72
100s/50s	0/3
Top score	93*
Balls bowled	48
Wickets	2
Bowling average	30.00
5 wickets in innings	0
10 wickets in match	0
Best bowling	1/21
Catches/stumpings	12/–
- Source: CricketArchive, 22 February 2015

Bertie Joseph Tuckwell (6 October 1882 – 2 January 1943) was an Australian-born cricketer who played first-class cricket in Australia and New Zealand during the early years of the 20th century.

Born in the Melbourne suburb of Carlton in 1882, Tuckwell was educated at University College in Armadale. He played three first-class matches for Victoria during the 1902–03 and 1903–04 seasons. On his first-class debut, in Victoria's first-ever match against Queensland, he scored 93 not out, batting at number seven, before Victoria declared. Victoria won by an innings. He played club cricket for St Kilda and Melbourne Cricket Clubs before moving to New Zealand. He continued to play cricket there, playing four first-class matches for Otago before World War I and two for Wellington during the 1918–19 season.

He toured Australia with the New Zealand team in 1913–14, and later that season he played for the New Zealand side against the touring Australian team in New Zealand. In the first of the two international matches, batting at number three, he top-scored for New Zealand in the first innings with 50, but he was omitted from the team for the second match. As well as being an attractive batsman, strong on the cut, he was a reliable slip fieldsman.

Tuckwell was a prominent businessman in Wellington. He died there on 2 January 1943 after a short illness at the age of 60. He was survived by his son and two daughters.
