= Robert Somervell =

New Zealand cricketer

Personal information
- Full name: Robert Cooke Somervell
- Born: 18 May 1892; Auckland, New Zealand
- Died: 8 June 1967 (aged 75); Auckland, New Zealand
- Batting: Right-handed

Domestic team information
- Years: Team
- 1911/12–1921/22: Auckland

Career statistics
Competition	First-class
Matches	9
Runs scored	270
Batting average	19.28
100s/50s	0/2
Top score	74*
Balls bowled	254
Wickets	3
Bowling average	59.66
5 wickets in innings	0
10 wickets in match	0
Best bowling	1/21
Catches/stumpings	2/–
- Source: Cricinfo, 9 April 2021

Robert Somervell (18 May 1892 – 8 June 1967) was a New Zealand cricketer. He played eight first-class matches for Auckland between 1911 and 1922.

Somervell was a batsman. He toured Australia with the New Zealand team in 1913-14, but made a pair in the only first-class match he played on the tour. His highest first-class score was 74 not out for Auckland against Hawke's Bay in 1912–13.

Somervell married Lulu Bates in the Auckland suburb of Devonport in March 1918.
