= Henry Tattersall =

New Zealand cricketer (1892–1971)

Personal information
- Full name: Henry James Tattersall
- Born: 21 December 1892; Christchurch, New Zealand
- Died: 5 November 1971 (aged 78); Palmerston North, New Zealand
- Role: Wicket-keeper

Domestic team information
- Years: Team
- 1912/13–1913/14: Auckland
- 1922/23–1927/28: Wellington

Career statistics
Competition	First-class
Matches	6
Runs scored	94
Batting average	11.75
100s/50s	0/0
Top score	24
Catches/stumpings	7/4
- Source: ESPNcricinfo, 22 August 2018

Henry James Tattersall (21 December 1892 – 5 November 1971) was a New Zealand cricketer.

== Biography ==
=== Early life ===
Tattersall was born in Christchurch on 21 December 1892. Before World War I He worked as an engineer in an Auckland foundry.

=== War service ===
During the war Tattersall served overseas in the New Zealand Expeditionary Force as a sergeant. After the war he settled on 557 acres at Akitio which he had been granted after a ballot under the Discharged Soldiers Settlement Act.

=== Family ===
In April 1921 he married Muriel Childs. They had a son in 1922 but separated soon afterwards and divorced in 1927. He moved to Wellington.

=== Death ===
Tattersall died on 5 November 1971, aged 78, in Palmerston North.

== Cricket career ==
Tattersall played as a wicket-keeper, and made his first-class debut for Auckland against Hawke's Bay in March 1913, catching two batsmen and stumping two others. He played six first-class matches for Auckland and Wellington between 1913 and 1928. He toured Australia with the New Zealand team in 1913-14 as the second wicket-keeper, but did not play in any of the four first-class matches against state teams.
