= Tom Carlton =

Australian cricketer (1890–1973)

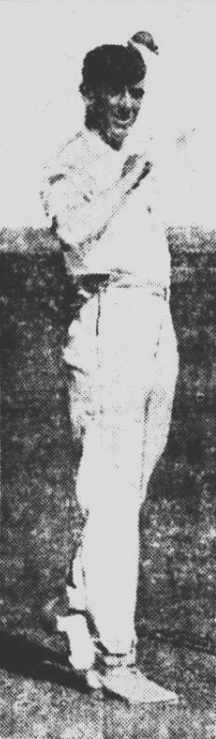

Personal information
- Full name: Thomas Andrew Carlton
- Born: 7 December 1890; Footscray, Melbourne, Victoria, Australia
- Died: 17 December 1973 (aged 83); Moreland, Victoria
- Batting: Left-handed
- Bowling: Left-arm medium
- Relatives: William Carlton (uncle)

Domestic team information
- Years: Team
- 1909/10–1914/15: Canterbury
- 1919/20: Victoria
- 1920/21–1921/22: Otago
- 1922/23–1923/24: Victoria
- 1928/29–1931/32: South Australia

Career statistics
Competition	First-class
Matches	60
Runs scored	1,153
Batting average	15.37
100s/50s	0/2
Top score	63
Balls bowled	11,469
Wickets	185
Bowling average	24.61
5 wickets in innings	7
10 wickets in match	2
Best bowling	6/42
Catches/stumpings	48/0
- Source: CricketArchive, 11 May 2014

Thomas Andrew Carlton (7 December 1890 – 17 December 1973) was an Australian cricketer who played first-class cricket in New Zealand and Australia from 1909 to 1932.

== Cricket career ==
=== Canterbury, 1909–10 to 1914–15 ===
Born in the Melbourne suburb of Footscray in 1890, Tom Carlton was a tall left-arm pace bowler and useful tail-end batsman who bowled "an impeccable length" and moved the ball away from right-hand batsmen. He moved to New Zealand in late 1909 and settled in Christchurch, where he played alongside his uncle, William Carlton, who had been appointed coach of the Canterbury Cricket Association.

Carlton made his first-class debut for Canterbury in a friendly match against Otago in December 1909, a few days after his 19th birthday. Opening the bowling, he took 4 for 58 and 6 for 42 in Canterbury's four-wicket victory. He thus achieved his career-best innings and match figures in his first match. A few weeks later he made his highest first-class score of 63 against the touring Australians, adding 167 for the seventh wicket with Dan Reese after coming to the wicket when Canterbury were 80 for 6.

He was part of Canterbury's Plunket Shield-winning team in 1910–11 and 1912–13, and was selected to tour Australia with the New Zealand team in 1913–14, although he took only one wicket in the two first-class matches he played on the tour. When he returned to New Zealand he played for Canterbury against the touring Australian team, taking 6 for 142 in the innings in which Victor Trumper and Arthur Sims set the world record eighth-wicket partnership of 433 in 181 minutes.

In the deciding match of the 1914–15 Plunket Shield Carlton top-scored for Canterbury in the second innings with 50 made at number five, and took 5 for 65 and 4 for 38 in the team's victory over Wellington. It was his last match for Canterbury.

=== Victoria, 1919–20 ===
Carlton played three matches for Victoria in the 1919–20 season, including one Sheffield Shield match, with moderate success.

=== Otago, 1920–21 to 1921–22 ===
He returned to New Zealand, making his debut for Otago (and captaining the team) late in the 1920–21 season against his old team, Canterbury. He took 5 for 39 and 5 for 76 in a 94-run victory. He was appointed coach to the Otago Cricket Association for the 1921–22 season. He also captained Otago in 1921–22, when they lost all three matches in the Plunket Shield. He was the team's leading wicket-taker with 14 wickets at an average of 27.78, and made a few useful runs in the middle order. At the end of the season he was also the leading wicket-taker, with six wickets, for South Island in a match against North Island. He then returned to Melbourne.

=== Victoria, 1922–23 to 1923–24 ===
Carlton returned to play in Australia in 1922–23, taking 5 for 67 for Victoria in a victory over South Australia in his first match. He played one more match that season and two in 1923–24 but made only modest contributions.

=== South Australia, 1928–29 to 1931–32 ===
After a gap of five years Carlton appeared for South Australia in the second half of the 1928–29 season at the age of 38. In his second match he took 5 for 64 off 31 eight-ball overs against Marylebone Cricket Club, including the wickets of Jack Hobbs, Patsy Hendren, Maurice Leyland and Les Ames.

He played throughout the next three seasons. In all he played 27 matches for South Australia, taking 77 wickets at an average of 28.22. He had his most successful season of all in 1930–31, when he took 31 wickets at 21.38. He played his last first-class game at the end of the 1931–32 season at the age of 41.

Carlton returned to live in Victoria in 1932.
