= Robert Barbour (cricketer) =

Australian cricketer

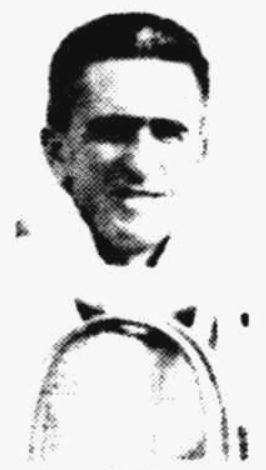

Personal information
- Full name: Robert Roy Pitty Barbour
- Born: 29 March 1899; Ashfield, New South Wales
- Died: 29 December 1994 (aged 95); Berwick, Victoria
- Relatives: Eric Barbour (brother)
- Source: Cricinfo, 22 March 2017

Robert Barbour (29 March 1899 – 29 December 1994) was an Australian cricketer. He played six first-class matches for Oxford University Cricket Club and Queensland between 1919 and 1923. He won a Rhodes Scholarship to study at Balliol College, Oxford. He returned to Australia and was warden of Melbourne University Union 1940–54 and senior lecturer in classics 1954–67.

== See also ==
- List of Oxford University Cricket Club players
- List of Queensland first-class cricketers
