= Wiri Baker =

New Zealand cricketer (1892–1966)

Personal information
- Full name: Wiri Aurunui Baker
- Born: 2 April 1892; Ōtaki, New Zealand
- Died: 1 July 1966 (aged 74); Wellington, New Zealand
- Batting: Right-handed
- Bowling: Slow

Domestic team information
- Years: Team
- 1911/12–1929/30: Wellington

Career statistics
Competition	First-class
Matches	36
Runs scored	1,874
Batting average	29.74
100s/50s	3/9
Top score	143
Balls bowled	248
Wickets	8
Bowling average	13.25
5 wickets in innings	1
10 wickets in match	0
Best bowling	5/50
Catches/stumpings	22/–
- Source: CricketArchive, 2 October 2014

Wiri Aurunui Baker (2 April 1892 – 1 July 1966) was a cricketer who played first-class cricket for Wellington from 1912 to 1930, and played twice for New Zealand in the days before New Zealand played Test cricket.

== Personal life ==
Wiri Baker was delivered by a Māori midwife. In recognition of her help his parents asked her to suggest a Māori name for him. He was educated at Wellington College. He started work as a compositor for the Government Printing Office, then became the Senior Purchasing Officer, eventually becoming Deputy Government Printer. He played the euphonium in a church band.

Baker served in World War I in the New Zealand forces that took Samoa in 1914 but contracted pleurisy shortly afterwards and was discharged. He married Gladys Anderson in October 1920.

== Cricket career ==
Baker recovered from his illness and was able to resume his cricket career for Wellington in December 1914, when he scored 119 and 72, top-scoring in each innings, against Auckland. He was the leading scorer in the 1914–15 New Zealand first-class season, with 353 runs at an average of 50.42. In Wellington senior cricket in 1915–16 he made a record score for the competition of 241 not out. He beat his own record in 1918–19 when he scored 254, and added two more double-centuries in the 1920s.

Baker was an opening batsman who possessed "great defence and patience, which is heart-breaking to bowlers and fieldsmen alike". But he could also play aggressively, as he did when he scored 124 and put on 252 for the second wicket in about two and a half hours with Ernest Beechey against Auckland in 1918–19. He made his third and last first-class century in 1923–24, when he scored 143 against Otago, putting on 227 for the second wicket in three hours with Bert Kortlang. Victory in this match gave Wellington the Plunket Shield.

Later in the season New South Wales made a short tour of New Zealand. After scoring 73 and 11 not out for Wellington against the touring team, Baker was selected in the New Zealand team for the two matches against New South Wales. His 69 runs in four innings still made him New Zealand's third-highest scorer in the two defeats.

He played twice for Wellington in 1924–25 without success, then returned to Wellington club cricket, where in a long career he scored more than 10,000 runs. However, he played one final match for Wellington in 1929–30 against Otago. Having never taken a wicket before in first-class cricket, he took 3 for 50 and 5 for 50 with his slow bowling to help Wellington to a 64-run victory on their way to another Plunket Shield.

His younger brother George also played first-class cricket for Wellington. The brothers played in the same Wellington side in two matches in 1919–20.

== Later life and death ==
In 1953, Baker was awarded the Queen Elizabeth II Coronation Medal. He died in Wellington on 1 July 1966, and his ashes were buried in Karori Cemetery.
