= William Macgregor (cricketer) =

Australian cricketer and veterinarian

Personal information
- Born: 23 February 1888; St Kilda, Victoria, Australia
- Died: 5 October 1980 (aged 92); Benalla, Victoria
- Batting: Right-handed
- Role: Wicket-keeper

Career statistics
Competition	First-class
Matches	4
Runs scored	50
Batting average	16.66
100s/50s	0/0
Top score	35
Catches/stumpings	5/4
- Source: Cricket Archive, 4 July 2016

William Macgregor (23 February 1888 – 5 October 1980) was an Australian cricketer, veterinarian and grazier.

== Life and career ==
A wicket-keeper, Macgregor played four games of first-class cricket for the Australian cricket team in New Zealand in 1913–14, including one against New Zealand. He never played first-class cricket in Australia. Apart from this tour, his cricket career consisted of several seasons with University in the Melbourne competition.

He graduated from the University of Melbourne as a Licentiate in Veterinary Science in 1915. He served with the Australian Army Veterinary Corps as a captain in World War I, leaving Australia in November 1915 and returning in January 1919. He was twice mentioned in dispatches.

MacGregor married May Dare in Hampstead, London, in November 1916. They had one son. He bought and ran a grazing property, Tatong Estate, at Tatong in north-eastern Victoria, while his wife stayed in Melbourne. She divorced him in 1933 on the grounds of desertion. In March 1951 he married Kathleen Cadwallader in Melbourne.

MacGregor served as a councillor on the Benalla Shire Council from the 1930s to the 1950s, and was Shire President in the 1930s and 1940s. He died in Benalla in October 1980.
