= Leslie Cody =

Australian rugby league footballer and cricketer

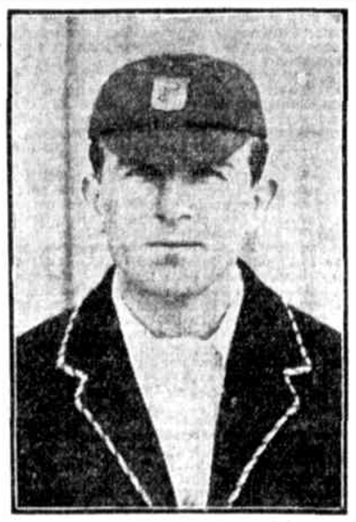

Personal information
- Full name: Leslie Alwyn Cody
- Born: 11 October 1889; Paddington, New South Wales, Australia
- Died: 10 August 1969 (aged 79); Toorak, Victoria, Australia
- Batting: Right-handed
- Bowling: Leg spin
- Role: Batsman

International information
- National side: Australia

Domestic team information
- Years: Team
- 1915–1922: Victoria
- 1912–1914: New South Wales

Career statistics
Competition	First-class
Matches	30
Runs scored	1230
Batting average	34.16
100s/50s	1/6
Top score	107
Balls bowled	224
Wickets	4
Bowling average	28.00
5 wickets in innings	0
10 wickets in match	0
Best bowling	2/22
Catches/stumpings	15/0
- Source: CricketArchive, 3 February 2009
- Rugby league career

Playing information
Club
Years	Team	Pld	T	G	FG	P
1910–11	Eastern Suburbs	19	8	2	0	28

Leslie Alwyn Cody (11 October 1889 – 10 August 1969) was an Australian sportsman who played both rugby league and cricket at a high level.

== Cricket ==
A right-handed batsman and leg spin bowler, Cody played first-class cricket between 1912 and 1922. After matches for New South Wales Colts, he made his first-class debut for New South Wales against Western Australia in November 1912. He played six further first-class matches that season.

While he never played Test cricket, Cody did play several times for the Australian national side. In 1913, he toured North America with Australia, playing matches in Bermuda, Canada and the United States. The Bermuda leg included one match against the Bermuda national side. The Canadian leg featured matches played all across the country, with matches in Ontario, Quebec, British Columbia, Manitoba, Saskatchewan and Alberta.

The Canadian leg also featured a first-class match against a combined Canada/US team in Toronto, which Cody played in, which was the first first-class match to be played in Canada. The US leg of the tour was confined mostly to the Eastern seaboard with matches taking place in Pennsylvania, New York and Rhode Island, in addition to three matches in Chicago. The US leg featured four first-class matches, all of which Cody played in. Three were against Philadelphia and one was against a combined Canada/US team.

Back in Australia, Cody played five first-class matches in the 1913/14 season before he was again selected for an Australian tour, this time to New Zealand from February to April 1914. Cody played six first-class matches on the tour, including the two against New Zealand.

In the 1914/15 season, Cody played three first-class matches, having now moved to play for Victoria, before the First World War interrupted his cricket career. He played five further first-class matches after the war, the last coming against Western Australia in March 1922.

== Rugby league ==
Cody played for Eastern Suburbs in the New South Wales Rugby League (NSWRL) in the years 1910 and 1911.

In the 1911 season he became the Tricolours' first premiership winning halfback. He played 19 first grade games for Easts between 1910 and 1911, scoring eight tries and two goals during his career there.

== See also ==
- List of Victoria first-class cricketers
- List of New South Wales representative cricketers
