= Bert Kortlang =

Australian cricketer

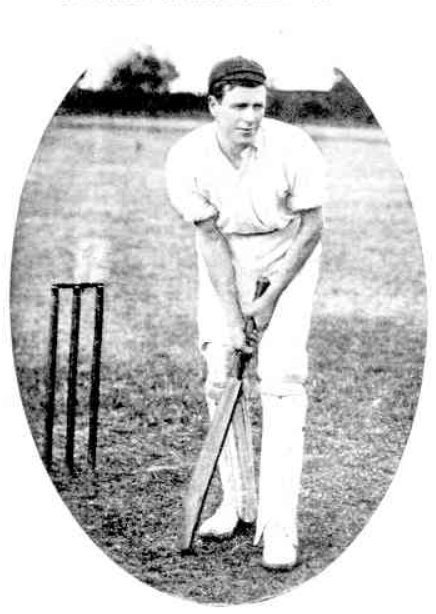
- Bert Kortlang in 1910

Personal information
- Full name: Henry Frederick Lorenz Kortlang
- Born: 12 March 1880; Melbourne, Australia
- Died: 15 February 1961 (aged 80); Cottesloe, Perth, Australia
- Height: 5 ft 6 1/2 in (1.69 m)
- Batting: Right-handed
- Bowling: Right-arm leg-spin

Domestic team information
- Years: Team
- 1909/10–1911/12: Victoria
- 1922/23–1926/27: Wellington

Career statistics
Competition	First-class
Matches	35
Runs scored	2,688
Batting average	49.77
100s/50s	6/16
Top score	214*
Balls bowled	126
Wickets	2
Bowling average	42.00
5 wickets in innings	0
10 wickets in match	0
Best bowling	1/32
Catches/stumpings	23/–
- Source: Cricinfo, 24 June 2016

Henry Frederick Lorenz Kortlang or Harry Herbert Lorenz Kortlang, known as Bert J. Kortlang (12 March 1880 – 15 February 1961) was an Australian cricketer who also held US citizenship due to his father having been born in New York City. He played 17 first-class cricket matches for Victoria between 1910 and 1912, and 15 matches for Wellington in New Zealand between 1922 and 1927. He also played for an Australian XI in 1911 and for a New Zealand XI in 1924.

== Life and career ==
Bert Kortlang travelled widely around the world, playing cricket wherever he found himself from the 1890s to the 1930s, although the reasons for most of his travels and his means of financing them remain obscure. Sir Pelham Warner once wrote of him: "We hear of him here; we hear of him there; the beggar pops up everywhere."

=== Early life and the Americas ===
Kortlang was a sturdily-built man five feet six and a half inches tall, a sound and patient batsman, difficult to dismiss, who could also hit hard and use his strong wrists to pull short balls to the boundary. After playing club cricket in his native Melbourne, he left home at the age of 15 after a disagreement with his father, who had chastised him for playing cricket for his school when he should have been helping at home. He went to Sydney, where he played three seasons for Balmain in the late 1890s.

He then left for the Americas, where during his travels he took part in an impromptu game of cricket on the frozen sea during the Klondike Gold Rush. He played cricket in New York City then went to Bermuda, representing the Hamilton Cricket Club on their tour of the eastern United States in 1905.

He was also a skilled billiards player, winning the New York amateur championship in January 1906. He spent some time in California, and was living in San Francisco at the time of the earthquake in April 1906. He lost his belongings when his hotel, the Winchester, was destroyed, but with the help of friends he was able to return to New York.

=== Back to Australia ===
Kortlang returned to Australia in 1909. An Australian newspaper said of him at the time: "He might well be described as an Americanised Australian, for he has the accent, the ease, the mental alertness, and, one may say, the entire atmosphere of the American who is a good sport." Living in Melbourne, he gained Sheffield Shield selection for Victoria in 1909-10, although he was most successful against the non-Shield teams Queensland and Western Australia, scoring centuries. In one of the matches against Western Australia he scored 197, and with Colin McKenzie, who scored 211, added 358 for the second wicket, an Australian second-wicket record. He was the leading scorer in the Australian first-class season, with 656 runs at an average of 131.20. In 1910-11, the national selectors gave him a trial in an Australian XI against the touring South Africans, but he was unable to break into the Test team.

Kortlang worked in a series of sales jobs in Melbourne. He married Muriel Jane McGill in Melbourne in December 1911. They had one child, a son named John, in June 1912. Kortlang left his wife shortly afterwards and they divorced in June 1919. In Sydney in March 1912 he rescued the daughter of the New South Wales state politician Dr Richard Arthur from drowning in heavy surf off Manly. Kortlang himself was almost drowned, but was rescued by the lifesaver on duty and resuscitated.

=== Return to the Americas and World War I ===
Kortlang went to Argentina in 1912, playing in the series of matches between North and South, representing South in 1912 and 1913. In 1914 he was employed by the Spalding sports equipment company, which sent him on a business trip to Central America. In April 1916 an Australian newspaper reported that he was in Barbados and playing cricket there. It went on: "Kortlang, who is known as 'The Globe Trotter Cricketer', has played cricket in Australia, New Zealand, Alaska, Chili, Argentine, Singapore, Bermuda, Barbadoes, West Indies, Canada and the United States."

During World War I he fought in Europe with the 6th Field Company of Canadian Engineers with the rank of sergeant-major. After being gassed he was invalided back to Canada. In early 1918 he was conducting a party of recruits on a ship from Los Angeles to Victoria, British Columbia, when he discovered two German agents aboard who were planning to incite the recruits to desert. With the help of some colleagues Kortlang arrested the two men, who were subsequently tried and imprisoned for espionage.

Although the effects of the poison gas stayed with him for years, he was able to continue playing cricket. In 1919, playing for Manor Field, he was the leading batsman in the Halifax Cup competition in the eastern United States for the third time, scoring 601 runs at an average of 66.77, with three centuries.

=== New Zealand ===
Kortlang returned to New Zealand in September 1922, "to represent a motor firm of New York". He told a Dunedin newspaper, "I may play in Wellington or Christchurch, as that is where my business will keep me most." By this stage he had added Britain, South Africa, India, Fiji, Ceylon and China to the list of countries in which he had played cricket. He began playing club cricket in Wellington, and after only one match he was selected to play for the provincial side.

At the age of 42 he played his first first-class match since 1912 when he made his debut for Wellington in the first match of the 1922-23 Plunket Shield season. He scored a century in the first innings, the former New Zealand captain Tom Cobcroft reporting: "There was hardly a stroke in the repertoire of any batsman that was not cleverly used by him. His driving, late cutting, glancing, hooking and pulling all were made in the most artistic style." He was the highest scorer in the Plunket Shield that season, with 288 runs at an average of 72.00.

In the 1923-24 Plunket Shield he scored 318 runs at an average of 53.00, and Wellington won the trophy by winning all three of their matches. He and Wiri Baker added 227 for the second wicket in the match against Otago, a Plunket Shield second-wicket record that stood for many years. Later in the season a strong New South Wales team toured New Zealand, including in their itinerary two matches against the full New Zealand team. Kortlang played in the second match and was New Zealand's highest scorer with 39 (in 132 minutes, of New Zealand's first-innings total of 89) and 14 in an innings defeat.

In 1924 Kortlang returned to the US for a few months, working as a promoter for De Forest Phonofilm in New York City as the company worked to develop early sound film technology. The company's fortunes received a boost in August 1924. When Lee de Forest and Kortlang read that President Coolidge had been unable to fulfil a commitment to attend a newspaper convention in New York, the two men went to Washington, met Coolidge, and persuaded him to address the convention on film. Coolidge became the first U.S. President to appear in a sound film after de Forest and Kortlang filmed him at the White House on 11 August and screened the film at the New York convention.

Wellington won the Plunket Shield again in 1925-26, Kortlang scoring 305 runs at 76.25. Most of his runs came from an innings of 214 not out in the final match against Auckland. Wellington needed to win the match to secure the championship, and won by 512 runs. He played his last first-class match in the 1926-27 season.

He then spent three years in Canada until 1930, still playing cricket. He reported on the Australian tour of England in 1930 for the Toronto Star, on the New Zealand tour of England in 1931 for the Wellington Evening Post, and on the South African tour of Australia in 1931–32 for the London Star.

=== Back to Australia again ===
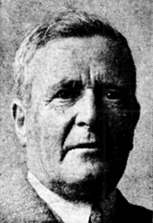
Bert Kortlang in 1935

After another visit to Bermuda, Kortlang returned to live in Australia. He had a business in Manly in 1934, and was coaching there. He finally settled in Perth in 1935, when The West Australian wrote: "B. J. Kortlang looks, and is, a wanderer tired of wandering. He is Canadian in accent, American in mannerism, and Australian at heart."

In 1935 he was one of the founders of baseball in Western Australia, after advocating the sport to help the local cricketers develop their fielding skills. He persuaded his former employer, the Spalding company, to donate two sets of baseball gear to get the project going. Participation was so enthusiastic that Western Australia was able to compete in the Claxton Shield interstate competition for the first time in 1937. He came to be regarded as the father of Western Australian baseball.

Kortlang married his second wife, Robina, known as Bena, in Perth in January 1936. She was a New Zealander. A daughter, Jan, was born in Perth in January 1937. Don Bradman, a good friend of Kortlang, was Jan's godfather.

Kortlang continued to work as a journalist until the 1950s, when he and his wife established a business supplying ships at the port of Fremantle.

Kortlang died suddenly in Perth in February 1961, aged 80.
