= Leonard Howard (cricketer) =

Australian cricketer (1886–1945)

Personal information
- Born: 18 April 1886; Adelaide, Australia
- Died: 18 August 1945 (aged 59); Prospect, Australia
- Source: Cricinfo, 9 August 2020

Leonard Howard (18 April 1886 – 14 August 1945) was an Australian cricketer. He played in six first-class matches for South Australia between 1908 and 1914.

== See also ==
- List of South Australian representative cricketers
