= Leslie Taylor =

New Zealand cricketer

Personal information
- Full name: Leslie George Taylor
- Born: 26 June 1894; Auckland, New Zealand
- Died: 17 January 1977 (aged 82); Auckland, New Zealand
- Batting: Right-handed

Domestic team information
- Years: Team
- 1910/11–1917/18: Auckland

Career statistics
Competition	First-class
Matches	14
Runs scored	419
Batting average	16.76
100s/50s	0/2
Top score	92
Balls bowled	438
Wickets	11
Bowling average	29.81
5 wickets in innings	0
10 wickets in match	0
Best bowling	4/35
Catches/stumpings	9/–
- Source: CricketArchive, 20 February 2015

Leslie George Taylor (26 June 1894 – 17 January 1977) was a New Zealand cricketer who played first-class cricket for Auckland from 1911 to 1918.

Taylor was born in Auckland and educated at Mount Eden School. He worked in Auckland as a clerk.

An all-rounder, Taylor made his first-class debut against Hawke's Bay in the last match of the 1910–11 season, making 59 and taking 4 for 35 in an innings victory for Auckland. His highest score was 92 against Canterbury in 1912–13. He toured Australia with the New Zealand team in 1913-14, playing in three of the four matches against state teams.
