= Edward Hickmott =

English cricketer

Personal information
- Full name: Edward Hickmott
- Born: 20 March 1850; Maidstone, Kent
- Died: 7 January 1934 (aged 83); West Malling, Kent
- Batting: Right-handed
- Role: Wicket-keeper
- Relatives: William Hickmott (nephew)

Domestic team information
- Years: Team
- 1875–1888: Kent
- FC debut: 31 May 1875 Kent v Sussex
- Last FC: 19 July 1888 Kent v Gloucestershire

Career statistics
Competition	First-class
Matches	10
Runs scored	85
Batting average	6.53
100s/50s	0/0
Top score	44
Catches/stumpings	16/3
- Source: CricInfo, 2 August 2020

Edward Hickmott (20 March 1850 – 7 January 1934) was an English cricketer. He played ten first-class matches for Kent County Cricket Club between 1875 and 1888.

Hickmott was born at Maidstone in Kent in 1850, the son of John and Harriet Hickmott. His father worked as a cooper and later became a publican, running The King's Head in Boxley, a pub which became the family business.

He first appeared for Kent Colts in 1874, playing in the same match as his twin brother William. Hickmott made his senior debut for Kent the following year, playing twice. His other eight matches for the county took place during the 1880s, with three appearances in 1886 and 1887 and one in each of 1881 and 1888.

From 1880 he was employed as groundsman and as a professional by The Mote in Maidstone, a job which lasted until 1920. Hickmott laid a new wicket at the ground in 1908 and a benefit match was played there for him in 1904. He made his highest first-class score, 44 runs, on the ground in 1886 and scored a number of centuries for The Mote in club cricket.

As well as playing cricket, Hickmott was a hunter and a fine swimmer and rower. He lived with his twin brother throughout his life, moving to West Malling with William after he retired from running The King's Arms. Hickmott died there in 1934 aged 83. William's son, also named William, played for Kent and Lancashire before and after the First World War.

== Bibliography ==
- Carlaw, Derek (2020). Kent County Cricketers, A to Z: Part One (1806–1914) (PDF). Cardiff: ACS.
