= Australian cricket team in New Zealand in 1913–14 =

International cricket tour

Australian tour of New Zealand 1913/14
- Dates: Feb 1910 – Mar 1910
- Cricket format: First-class
- Matches: 7
- Most runs: Victor Trumper (628)
- Most wickets: Warwick Armstrong (52)

The Australia national cricket team toured New Zealand from February to April 1914 and played eight first-class matches including two against the New Zealand national team. New Zealand at this time had not been elevated to Test status. The tour was organized and captained by Arthur Sims, who had previously represented New Zealand. The tour is notable for the fact that it featured Victor Trumper's final appearance in a first-class match before his death at age 37 in 1915.

== The team ==
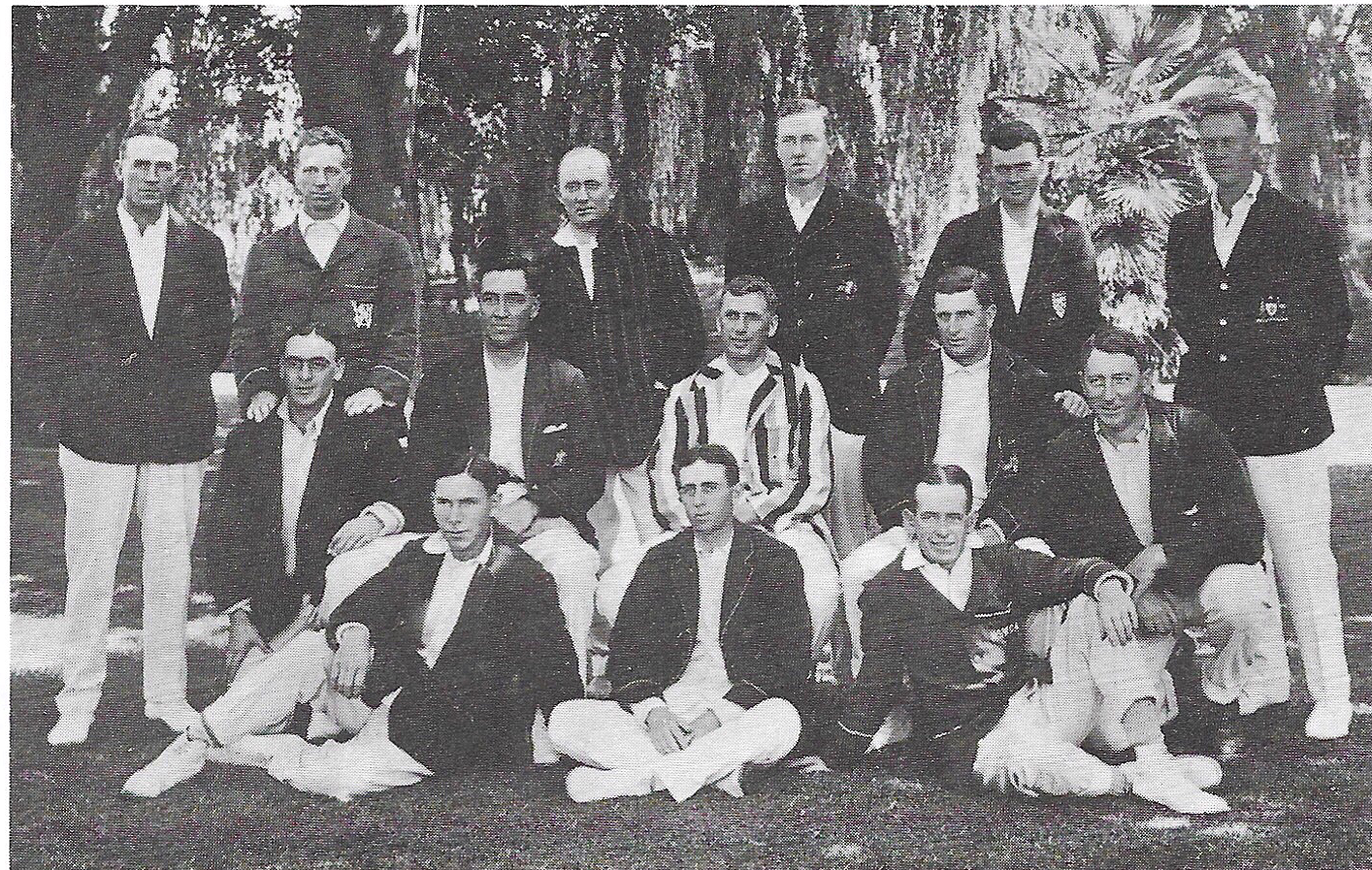
The Australian cricket team in New Zealand 1913/14

The Australian touring team was as follows:

| Name | Age | Role | Batting style | Bowling style | First-class team |
|---|---|---|---|---|---|
| Arthur Sims (captain) | 36 | Batter | Right-handed | – | Canterbury (NZ) |
| Warwick Armstong | 34 | All-rounder | Right-handed | Right-arm legspin | Victoria |
| Leslie Cody | 24 | Batter | Right-handed | Leg-break googly | New South Wales |
| Herbie Collins | 26 | All-rounder | Right-handed | Slow left-arm orthodox | New South Wales |
| Jack Crawford | 27 | All-rounder | Right-handed | Right-arm medium, right-arm off-break | South Australia |
| Charlie Dolling | 27 | Batter | Right-handed | – | South Australia |
| Frank Laver | 44 | Bowler | Right-handed | Right-arm medium | Victoria |
| William MacGregor | 25 | Wicket-keeper | Right-handed | – | Victoria |
| Colin McKenzie | 33 | Batter | Right-handed | – | Victoria |
| Arthur Mailey | 28 | Bowler | Right-handed | Right-arm leg-break and googly | New South Wales |
| Monty Noble | 41 | All-rounder | Right-handed | Right-arm medium pace | New South Wales |
| Vernon Ransford | 28 | | Left-handed | Slow left-arm orthodox | Victoria |
| Victor Trumper | 36 | Batter | Right-handed | Right arm medium | New South Wales |
| Gar Waddy | 34 | Wicket-keeper | Right-handed | Right-arm medium | New South Wales |

Eric Barbour was invited but was unable to go, and Cody took his place. Macgregor's cricket career, apart from this tour, consisted of several seasons with University in the Melbourne competition.

== Matches ==
The original itinerary had 13 matches. The match against Manawatu and the return matches against Canterbury and Wellington were added later.

First-class matches are indicated in bold.

- South Auckland XVIII v Australians, Seddon Park, Hamilton, 3, 4 February 1914. South Auckland XVIII 247 and 99 for 7; Australians 287. Drawn.

South Auckland used 15 of their team in the field.

- **Auckland v Australians**, Eden Park, Auckland, 6, 7, 9 February 1914. Auckland 251 and 186; Australians 658. Australians won by an innings and 221 runs.

Auckland's captain, Lancelot Hemus, scored 112 in the first innings. Waddy, Armstrong and Ransford all scored centuries for the Australians, who made 620 for 8 on the second day.

- South Taranaki XVI v Australians, Bayly Park, Hāwera, 10, 11 February 1914. South Taranaki XVI 232 and 99; Australians 271 and 61 for 2. Australians won by eight wickets.

The Australians batted on in the second innings after winning, finishing on 370 for 9.

- **Wellington v Australians**, Basin Reserve, Wellington, 13, 14, 16 February 1914. Wellington 201 and 71; Australians 124 and 149 for 3. Australians won by seven wickets.

Armstrong took 5 for 80 and 7 for 17.

- **Hawke's Bay v Australians**, Nelson Cricket Ground, Hastings, 18, 19 February 1914. Hawke's Bay 172 and 159; Australians 293 and 41 for 1. Australians won by nine wickets.

On the first day 465 runs were scored for the loss of 20 wickets, off 108 overs. The match was completed midway through the second of the three scheduled days. The Australians batted on after winning to fill up the second day, finishing on 175 for 8.

- Poverty Bay v Australians, Childers Road Reserve, Gisborne, 20, 21 February 1914. Poverty Bay 155 and 43 for 5; Australians 461. Drawn.

The Poverty Bay captain, Len McMahon, scored 87 not out, and was later selected in the New Zealand team for the second match against the Australians. It was the first visit of an international cricket team to Gisborne, and the Gisborne Borough Council declared a half-holiday for the first day of the match, a Friday, and gave a civic reception to the Australians on the Friday morning.

- Wanganui v Australians, Cook's Gardens, Wanganui, 24, 25 February 1914. Wanganui 104; Australians 285 for 9. Drawn.

On the first day, rain prevented play after the luncheon interval.

- **Canterbury v Australians**, Lancaster Park, Christchurch, 27, 28 February, 2 March 1914. Canterbury 92 and 197; Australians 653. Australians won by an innings and 364 runs.

Trumper (293) and Sims (184 not out) added 433 for the eighth wicket in 181 minutes. It remains the world first-class record for the eighth wicket. Trumper batted at number nine, held back on the Friday evening with the intention of providing a spectacle for the larger crowd on the Saturday, when the Australians made 545 for 4.

- South Canterbury v Australians, Temuka Oval, Temuka, 3, 4 March 1914. South Canterbury XV 180; Australians 922 for 9. Drawn.

The Australians made 805 for 6 on the second day, reaching 900 in 325 minutes; Crawford scored 354, Trumper 135 and Cody 106.

- **New Zealand v Australia**, Carisbrook, Dunedin, 6, 7, 9 March 1914. New Zealand 228 and 209; Australia 354 and 84 for 3. Australians won by seven wickets.
- Southland v Australians, Rugby Park, Invercargill, 10, 11 March 1914. Southland 156; Australians 709. Drawn.

Trumper, Collins, McKenzie and Cody all scored centuries. The Australians made 596 for 6 on the second day.

- **Canterbury v Australians**, Lancaster Park, Christchurch, 13, 14 March 1914. Canterbury 258 and 169; Australians 243. Drawn.

Although this was a first-class match it was scheduled for only two days. It was played as a benefit match for Lancaster Park.

- Nelson XV v Australians, Trafalgar Park, Nelson, 18, 19 March 1914. Nelson XV 145 and 35; Australians 172 and 9 for 0. Australians won by 10 wickets.
- **Wellington v Australians**, Basin Reserve, Wellington, 20, 21 March 1914. Wellington 151; Australians 237. Drawn.

This was another two-day first-class match. Rain prevented play for much of the first day.

- Manawatu XV v Australians, Fitzherbert Park, Palmerston North, 23, 24 March 1914. Manawatu XV 177; Australians 510. Drawn.

The Australians scored their 510 on the second day.

- **New Zealand v Australia**, Eden Park, Auckland, 27, 28, 30 March 1914. New Zealand 269 and 228; Australia 610 for 6 declared. Australians won by an innings and 113 runs.

Ned Sale scored 109 not out in New Zealand's first innings. Waddy, Crawford, Armstrong and Dolling scored centuries for Australia. Trumper scored a quick 81 in his last first-class innings.

== First-class statistics ==
=== Batting ===
| Name | Matches | Innings | Not Outs | 100s | 50s | H.S. | Runs | Average |
|---|---|---|---|---|---|---|---|---|
| VT Trumper | 7 | 9 | 0 | 1 | 3 | 293 | 628 | 69.77 |
| EL Waddy | 8 | 10 | 3 | 2 | 1 | 140 | 480 | 68.57 |
| WW Armstrong | 8 | 8 | 1 | 2 | 2 | 128 | 441 | 63.00 |
| VS Ransford | 4 | 5 | 1 | 2 | - | 159 | 283 | 70.75 |
| CE Dolling | 7 | 9 | 0 | 1 | 1 | 104 | 269 | 29.88 |
| A Sims | 7 | 6 | 2 | 1 | - | 184* | 204 | 51.00 |
| MA Noble | 7 | 7 | 0 | - | 1 | 90 | 201 | 28.71 |
| JN Crawford | 5 | 5 | 0 | 1 | 1 | 134 | 190 | 38.00 |
| HL Collins | 6 | 8 | 0 | - | 1 | 94 | 185 | 23.12 |
| LA Cody | 6 | 7 | 2 | - | 1 | 54 | 160 | 32.00 |
| C McKenzie | 7 | 7 | 2 | - | - | 34 | 137 | 27.4 |
| W Macgregor | 4 | 5 | 2 | - | - | 35 | 50 | 16.66 |
| AA Mailey | 8 | 7 | 0 | - | - | 12 | 35 | 5.00 |
| FJ Laver | 4 | 4 | 1 | - | - | 19* | 25 | 8.33 |

=== Bowling ===
| Name | Matches | Overs | Maidens | Runs | Wickets | Average |
|---|---|---|---|---|---|---|
| Warwick Armstrong | 8 | 307.1 | 81 | 789 | 52 | 15.17 |
| Leslie Cody | 6 | 16.2 | 5 | 62 | 2 | 31 |
| Herbie Collins | 6 | 22 | 3 | 64 | 2 | 32 |
| Jack Crawford | 5 | 135.5 | 27 | 388 | 21 | 18.47 |
| Charlie Dolling | 7 | - | - | - | - | - |
| Frank Laver | 4 | 93 | 25 | 274 | 8 | 34.25 |
| William Macgregor | 4 | - | - | - | - | - |
| Arthur Mailey | 8 | 151.3 | 18 | 570 | 30 | 19.00 |
| Colin McKenzie | 7 | 49 | 13 | 121 | 8 | 15.12 |
| Monty Noble | 7 | 121.5 | 31 | 318 | 18 | 17.66 |
| Vernon Ransford | 4 | 21 | 6 | 41 | 2 | 20.5 |
| Arthur Sims | 7 | - | - | - | - | - |
| Victor Trumper | 7 | - | - | - | - | - |
| Gar Waddy | 8 | 2 | 0 | 11 | 1 | 11 |
