= James Condliffe =

New Zealand cricketer

Personal information
- Full name: James William Condliffe
- Born: 30 July 1888; Wellington, New Zealand
- Died: 23 November 1945 (aged 57); Wellington, New Zealand
- Batting: Right-handed
- Role: Wicket-keeper

Domestic team information
- Years: Team
- 1909/10–1913/14: Otago
- 1917/18–1922/23: Wellington

Career statistics
Competition	First-class
Matches	30
Runs scored	610
Batting average	12.44
100s/50s	0/1
Top score	62
Catches/stumpings	32/20
- Source: CricketArchive, 11 January 2015

James William Condliffe (30 July 1888 – 23 November 1945) was a wicket-keeper who played first-class cricket for Otago and Wellington from 1909 to 1923 and played five times for New Zealand in the days before New Zealand played Test cricket.

== Cricket career ==
=== For Otago ===
James Condliffe made his first-class debut for Otago in 1909–10, and played as Otago's regular wicket-keeper until World War I. He won the award for the best batting average in senior Dunedin cricket in the 1912–13 season. He was selected to play for New Zealand against the touring Australians early in 1914 when Charles Boxshall, who had occupied the wicket-keeping position for the previous 15 years, was unavailable. He made 25 and, opening the batting in the second innings, 23 in a first-wicket partnership of 80 with Harry Whitta. After New Zealand lost the match, Condliffe was one of only four New Zealand players who kept their place in the team for the second match against Australia.

He served as a driver with the field artillery in the New Zealand forces in World War I. He was wounded at Gallipoli.

=== For Wellington ===
After the war Condliffe resumed his cricket career, playing for Wellington as their regular wicket-keeper from 1917–18 to 1922–23. He made his top score of 62 against Canterbury in 1919–20: after Wellington had been 47 for 6, he batted for 160 minutes and with the help of the tail-enders took the score to 262.

He played twice for New Zealand against MCC in 1922–23. He was replaced as Wellington's keeper by the 19-year-old Ken James in 1923–24, but although Condliffe was no longer playing domestic first-class cricket, he played one final match for New Zealand in 1924–25.
