= Don Sandman =

New Zealand cricketer (1889–1973)

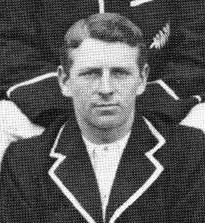
- Don Sandman in 1910

Personal information
- Full name: Donald McKay Sandman
- Born: 3 November 1889; Christchurch, New Zealand
- Died: 29 January 1973 (aged 83); Christchurch
- Batting: Right-handed
- Bowling: Right-arm leg-spin

Domestic team information
- Years: Team
- 1909/10–1926/27: Canterbury

Career statistics
Competition	First-class
Matches	55
Runs scored	1,841
Batting average	20.68
100s/50s	0/11
Top score	93
Balls bowled	8,761
Wickets	170
Bowling average	26.70
5 wickets in innings	6
10 wickets in match	0
Best bowling	7/30
Catches/stumpings	29/–
- Source: Cricket Archive, 12 December 2014

Donald McKay Sandman (3 November 1889 – 29 January 1973) was a New Zealand cricketer who played first-class cricket for Canterbury from 1910 to 1927 and played several times for New Zealand in the days before New Zealand played Test cricket.

== Early career ==
A leg-beak and googly bowler, useful lower-order batsman and fine fieldsman at point, Don Sandman took 63 wickets at an average of 9.80 for his Christchurch club, St Albans, in the 1909-10 season. He made his debut for Canterbury in February of that season against the touring Australians, taking three wickets. He was selected to play for New Zealand in the second "test" in March, and took 2 for 32 and 2 for 62.

Sandman was the outstanding bowler in Christchurch cricket in 1910-11, taking 84 wickets at an average of 10.78, when no one else reached 50 wickets. In his first Plunket Shield match, in 1910-11, he took 5 for 55 in the second innings to help Canterbury win the Shield. Auckland regained the Shield in 1911-12, but in 1912-13 Sandman made his highest score, 93, to help Canterbury take the title back.

He toured Australia with the New Zealanders in 1913-14, being preferred as the leg-spinner to Clarrie Grimmett of Wellington, who subsequently moved to Australia to try his luck there. Sandman took 20 wickets in the first two non-first-class matches against Northern New South Wales, and in the four state games he took 14 wickets at 32.64 and scored 182 runs at 30.33. He took four wickets in New Zealand's first "test" against the visiting Australians later that season, but was one of seven players omitted from the team for the second match.

Sandman served overseas as a sergeant in the Canterbury Infantry Battalion in World War I.

== After the war ==
Sandman resumed his cricket career after the war in good form, taking 17 first-class wickets at 20.64 in the 1919-20 season, and 28 wickets at 23.50 in 1920-21. He took his best figures of 7 for 30 against Otago in 1920-21, and played in both of New Zealand's matches against the touring Australians. They were his last games for New Zealand. He was the first bowler to take 50 wickets for New Zealand. He continued to play for Canterbury until 1926-27, captaining the team in 1925-26.

He was also a rugby player, who played half-back in the New Zealand Army team which toured South Africa in 1919 and also played for South Island in 1921. He also "excelled at billiards, hockey, badminton, boxing, lawn tennis, bowls and rifle shooting".

In January 1937 Sandman was travelling on a train between Greymouth and Hokitika when it crashed, killing one passenger, injuring many others, and trapping many inside the wrecked carriages. Despite receiving a spinal injury himself, Sandman helped rescue 17 injured passengers from the wreckage.

Sandman and his wife Jessie had a daughter and a son. He died in Christchurch on 29 January 1973, aged 83.
