= William Carlton (cricketer) =

Australian cricketer (1876–1959)

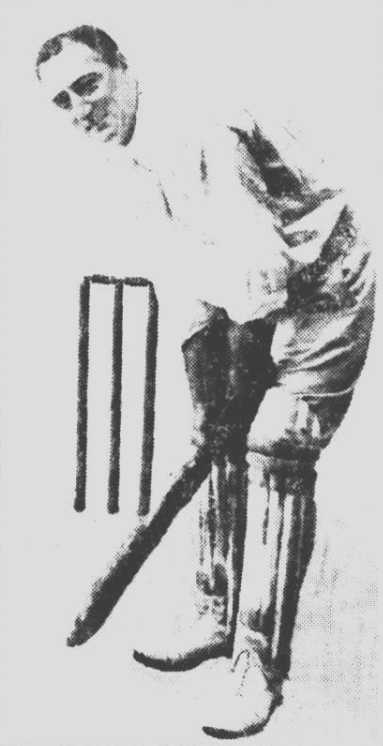

Personal information
- Born: 22 May 1876; Melbourne, Australia
- Died: 23 December 1959 (aged 83); Melbourne, Australia
- Batting: Right-handed
- Bowling: Right-arm
- Relatives: Tom Carlton (nephew)

Domestic team information
- Years: Team
- 1898/99–1913/14: Victoria
- 1899/00: Auckland
- 1909/10–1911/12: Canterbury

Career statistics
Competition	First-class
Matches	19
Runs scored	727
Batting average	23.45
100s/50s	0/6
Top score	88 not out
Balls bowled	952
Wickets	27
Bowling average	26.70
5 wickets in innings	0
10 wickets in match	0
Best bowling	3/17
Catches/stumpings	11/–
- Source: Cricinfo, 28 January 2020

William Carlton (22 May 1876 – 23 December 1959) was an Australian cricketer. He played first-class cricket for Victoria, Auckland and Canterbury between 1898 and 1914.

In 1909, the Australian Test player Hugh Trumble, having been asked by the Canterbury Cricket Association to find a coach, chose Carlton. As well as being an accomplished cricketer, Carlton was also a baseball and football player and a sprinter. He remained with Canterbury for three seasons before returning to Melbourne. He was one of the leading batsmen in New Zealand in 1909–10, with 238 runs in four matches at an average of 39.66 and a highest score of 88 not out, the highest score of the match, for Canterbury against Auckland in the Plunket Shield.
