= Rupert Hickmott =

New Zealand cricketer

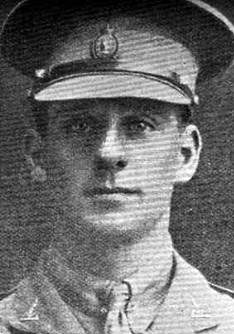

Personal information
- Full name: Rupert George Hickmott
- Born: 19 March 1894; Christchurch, New Zealand
- Died: 16 September 1916 (aged 22); Somme, France
- Batting: Right-handed
- Bowling: Right-arm leg-spin

Domestic team information
- Years: Team
- 1911-12 to 1914-15: Canterbury

Career statistics
| Competition | First-class |
|---|---|
| Matches | 17 |
| Runs scored | 778 |
| Batting average | 25.09 |
| 100s/50s | 1/4 |
| Top score | 109 |
| Balls bowled | 427 |
| Wickets | 11 |
| Bowling average | 27.27 |
| 5 wickets in innings | 0 |
| 10 wickets in match | 0 |
| Best bowling | 4/5 |
| Catches/stumpings | 7/0 |
- Source: Cricket Archive, 21 October 2014

Rupert George Hickmott (19 March 1894 – 16 September 1916) was a cricketer who played for Canterbury and New Zealand. He died in World War I.

== Life and career ==
Rupert Hickmott was born in Christchurch and educated at Christchurch Boys' High School, where he excelled at cricket, scoring a century in the Heathcote Williams Challenge Shield against Auckland Grammar School, and captaining the First XI for three years. He also captained the rugby XV.

At the start of the senior club season in Christchurch in 1911–12, in his first three innings he scored 112, 96 and 213 not out. He made his first-class debut for Canterbury in December 1911 at the age of 17, scoring 30 and 39 in a low-scoring match to help Canterbury to victory over Wellington. He made 52 and 33 in another victory over Wellington in his next match, which was his first in the Plunket Shield. In 1912-13 he made 77, the top score of the match, when Canterbury beat Otago by an innings to win the Plunket Shield.

He toured Australia with the New Zealand team in 1913-14, where he succeeded in some of the minor matches, but against the state teams he made only 94 runs at an average of 11.75. He was the outstanding batsman in the 1914-15 Plunket Shield, with 307 runs at 51.16, helping Canterbury to victories in all four matches. He top-scored in each innings against Auckland with 56 and 63; made his only century, 109, the top score of the match, against Hawke's Bay; and wound up both Otago innings with 2 for 7 and 4 for 5.

Hickmott enlisted in the New Zealand Expeditionary Force and served as a second lieutenant. He embarked from Wellington in March 1916 on the troopship Willochra. He was killed in action on the Somme in September 1916.

Hickmott's obituary in Wisden said he "was probably the most promising young cricketer in the Dominion, and his early death will be felt severely when the game is resumed". Dan Reese, his captain with both Canterbury and New Zealand, later wrote:

Hickmott ... was a fine all-rounder and to my mind would have become a Warwick Armstrong in New Zealand cricket, for he was a beautiful batsman and bowled "straight" leg-breaks like the great Victorian. His glorious outfielding against Harry Trott's team was a feature of the Canterbury match. His character and temperament made it certain that he would one day have been New Zealand's captain.
