= Allerton C. Hickmott =

Allerton Cushman Hickmott (February 4, 1895 – 1977) was an American book collector and writer.

He graduated from Dartmouth College in 1917.

He amassed a substantial collection of Shakespearian material he subsequently donated to Dartmouth.

He was appointed to the Savings Banks' Railroad Investment committee.

He received a doctor of letters from Trinity College in 1958.

He was a member of the Acorn Club, elected in 1963.

== Works ==
- The Ivory Pale: The Shakespearean Collection of Allerton C. Hickmott
