= William Hickmott =

English cricketer

Personal information
- Full name: William Edward Hickmott
- Born: 10 April 1893; Boxley, Kent
- Died: 16 January 1969 (aged 75); West Malling, Kent
- Batting: Right-handed
- Bowling: Left-arm slow-medium
- Role: Bowler
- Relatives: Edward Hickmott (uncle)

Domestic team information
- Years: Team
- 1914–1921: Kent
- 1923–1924: Lancashire
- FC debut: 31 August 1914 Kent v Hampshire
- Last FC: 12 July 1924 Lancashire v Surrey

Career statistics
Competition	First-class
Matches	37
Runs scored	301
Batting average	10.37
100s/50s	0/0
Top score	31*
Balls bowled	4,892
Wickets	92
Bowling average	25.65
5 wickets in innings	2
10 wickets in match	0
Best bowling	5/20
Catches/stumpings	25/–
- Source: CricInfo, 2 August 2020

William Edward Hickmott (10 April 1893 – 16 January 1968) was an English breeder of Golden Retrievers and professional cricketer who played between 1914 and 1924.

== Early life ==
Hickmott was born at Boxley in Kent, the son of William and Mary Hickmott. His family ran The King's Arms public house in the village. He was taken on at Kent County Cricket Clubs Tonbridge Nursery in 1910 and played for Kent's Second XI from 1911. He made his first-class cricket debut in August 1914, playing for Kent in their final match of the season against Hampshire and Bournemouth. An uncle, Edward Hickmott, had played for Kent in the 1870s as a wicket-keeper.

== Military service ==
Hickmott had already enrolled in the British Army when he made his senior debut. He served initially in the West Kent Yeomanry before transferring to the Royal West Kent Regiment (RWK), serving with 6 and 8 battalions RWK on the Western Front during World War I. He reached the rank of corporal.

== Post-war cricket ==
After the war, Hickmott played as a professional for Ramsbottom Cricket Club in the Lancashire League. He played twice for Kent in 1921 but was not engaged by the club and played for Lancashire in 1923 and 1924, making 34 first-class appearances. A left-arm bowler, Wisden recorded that Hickmott "bowled medium to rather slow and sometimes caused a lot of trouble without doing steady enough work to fulfil expectations". After 1925 he left Ramsbottom, playing Central Lancashire League cricket for Rochdale, for whom he took a league record 140 wickets in 1927. He later played for Wallasey and appeared for Liverpool District against a touring South American team in 1932.

== Later life ==
In later life, Hickmott became a well-known breeder of Golden Retrievers, regularly showing his dogs at Crufts. He died in 1968 at West Malling in Kent, aged 74.

== Bibliography ==
- Carlaw, Derek (2020). Kent County Cricketers, A to Z: Part One (1806–1914) (PDF). Cardiff: ACS.
