= Eric Barbour =

Australian cricketer, physician, and author (1891 – 1934)

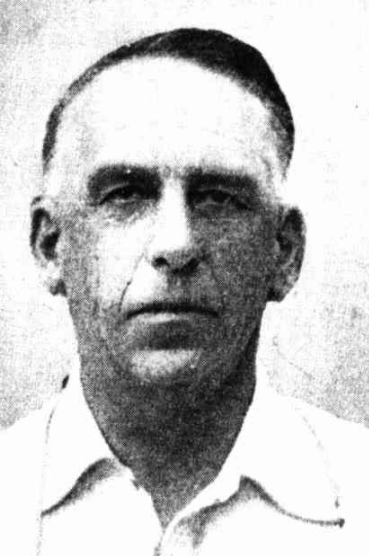
Eric Barbour

Eric Pitty Barbour (27 January 1891 – 7 December 1934) was an Australian cricket player, physician and author.

== Life and career ==
Barbour was born in Ashfield, Sydney, the son of George Pitty Barbour, a school headmaster. He was educated at Sydney Grammar School, where he was a prolific run scorer in the cricket team. He played for New South Wales and played first-class cricket between 1908 and 1925. His bowling style was leg break googly. He was selected to go to South Africa in 1914 but the tour was cancelled due to World War I. He served in the Australian Imperial Force in Egypt, England and France and was demobilized in 1919.

He practised medicine at Dorrigo in 1919–23, Stockton in 1923-29 and at Kensington until his death. He was also a writer on cricket for the Sydney Morning Herald and the Sydney Mail, and published two books on cricket. He married Jessie Nicholson and they had two sons and two daughters. He died at Darlinghurst, Sydney, aged 43.

Eric's brother Robert Roy Pitty Barbour (born 1899) was warden of Melbourne University Union from 1940 to 1954 and senior lecturer in classics from 1954 to 1967, and his youngest son Peter was director-general of the Australian Security Intelligence Organisation from 1970 to 1975.

== Selected publications ==
- The Making of a Cricketer: A Handbook for the Young Player with Ambition to Improve (1926)
- Anti Body-Line (1933) co-authored with Alan Kippax

== See also ==
- List of New South Wales representative cricketers
