= Arthur Sims =

New Zealand cricketer (1877–1969)

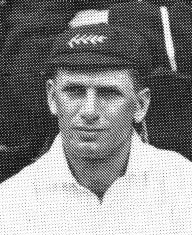
- Arthur Sims in 1910

Personal information
- Born: 27 July 1877; Spridlington, Lincolnshire, England
- Died: 27 April 1969 (aged 91); East Hoathly, Sussex, England
- Batting: Right-handed
- Role: Batsman

Domestic team information
- Years: Team
- 1896/97–1912/13: Canterbury
- FC debut: 8 January 1897 Canterbury v Queensland
- Last FC: 27 March 1914 Australia v New Zealand

Career statistics
Competition	First-class
Matches	53
Runs scored	2,182
Batting average	26.28
100s/50s	2/8
Top score	184*
Balls bowled	730
Wickets	19
Bowling average	21.52
5 wickets in innings	1
10 wickets in match	0
Best bowling	5/36
Catches/stumpings	51/–
- Source: CricketArchive, 13 October 2011

Sir Arthur Sims (27 July 1877 – 27 April 1969) was a New Zealand first-class cricketer, businessman and philanthropist.

== Early life ==
Sims was born in 1877 in Lincolnshire, England, the second son of Samuel and Louisa Sims, who were farmers. In 1880 they migrated to New Zealand, where Samuel managed a farm near Kaitangata in South Otago that belonged to James Rutherford, a member of the New Zealand House of Representatives. In 1884, after Rutherford died, the family moved to Canterbury, where Samuel managed the farm near Ashburton owned by another politician, John Grigg, one of the founders of the New Zealand frozen meat industry.

Arthur attended his local school until he won a scholarship to Christchurch Boys' High School. He moved to Christchurch in 1890, boarding with family friends during the school term and returning home during the holidays. He played for the school First XI for several years, scoring over 1000 runs and taking over 100 wickets in his last two years and captaining the team in his final year, 1895. After he left school, John Grigg helped him find a clerical position with the Canterbury Frozen Meat Company in Christchurch.

While working at the meat works Sims studied in the evenings at Canterbury College. He gained his BA and continued on to an MA. After that he studied accountancy and became a qualified accountant.

== Cricket career ==
Sims played cricket for Canterbury, New Zealand and, in 1914, for Australia. In 1913–14 he captained an Australian XI in New Zealand, putting on 433 runs for the 8th wicket in 181 minutes with Victor Trumper in the match against Canterbury, which remains the world record for that wicket in first-class cricket.

After his playing days, Sims had a long career as a cricket administrator. He was president of the New Zealand Cricket Council in the late 1930s, and after the Second World War he spent two decades as New Zealand's representative on the Imperial Cricket Conference at Lord's. In the 1930s he urged the English authorities to add a short tour of New Zealand to their regular tours of Australia; they acceded, and it became standard practice.

Sims was knighted in the 1950 New Year Honours "[f]or services to medicine and education in the British Commonwealth."

A biography, 84 Not Out: The Story of Sir Arthur Sims, Kt. by Alan Mitchell, was published in 1962.
