= Colin McKenzie (cricketer) =

Australian cricketer

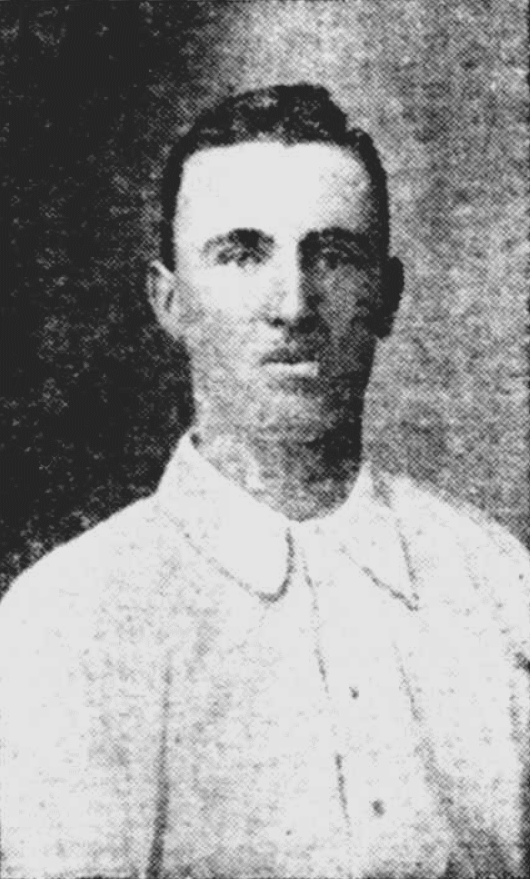

Personal information
- Born: 12 December 1880; Trawool, Victoria, Australia
- Died: 31 August 1930 (aged 49); Avenel, Victoria, Australia
- Batting: Right-handed

Domestic team information
- Years: Team
- 1907-1913: Victoria

Career statistics
Competition	First-class
Matches	30
Runs scored	1385
Batting average	31.47
100s/50s	2/7
Top score	211
Balls bowled
Wickets	27
Bowling average	30.55
5 wickets in innings	0
10 wickets in match	0
Best bowling	4/41
Catches/stumpings	18/0
- Source: Cricinfo, 16 August 2020

Colin McKenzie (12 December 1880 – 31 August 1930) was an Australian cricketer. He played 30 first-class cricket matches for Victoria between 1907 and 1913.

Playing against Western Australia in 1909–10, McKenzie scored 211, and with Bert Kortlang, who scored 197, added 358 for the second wicket, setting an Australian second-wicket record. He was once twelfth man for the Australian Test team.

McKenzie carried on the family tradition of pastoralism in northern Victoria. He died suddenly at his property, "Westbrook", in August 1930, aged 49.
