= Bill Patrick (cricketer) =

New Zealand cricketer

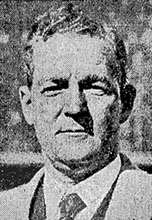
- Patrick in 1929

Personal information
- Full name: William Robert Patrick
- Born: 17 June 1885; Christchurch, New Zealand
- Died: 14 August 1946 (aged 61); Christchurch, New Zealand
- Batting: Right-handed
- Bowling: Right-arm offbreak

Domestic team information
- Years: Team
- 1905/06–1926/27: Canterbury
- 1917/18: Otago

Career statistics
Competition	First-class
Matches	74
Runs scored	3,536
Batting average	27.20
100s/50s	4/18
Top score	143
Balls bowled	1,945
Wickets	34
Bowling average	31.97
5 wickets in innings	2
10 wickets in match	0
Best bowling	6/36
Catches/stumpings	38/–
- Source: ESPNcricinfo, 1 June 2023

William Robert Patrick (17 June 1885 – 14 August 1946) was a New Zealand cricketer. He played first-class cricket for Canterbury between the 1905–06 and 1926–27 seasons, and captained New Zealand in the 1920s, before New Zealand played Test cricket.

Patrick was born at Christchurch in 1885. He played 58 of his 74 first-class matches for Canterbury, captaining the side frequently, and made 12 appearances for New Zealand XIs as well as playing in two wartime matches for Otago in 1917–18, both against Canterbury. He later coached the Southland cricket academy and was a New Zealand selector for the 1927 tour of England. Professionally he was a dealer in sports goods. He died at Christchurch in 1946 aged 61.
