= 2026 in New Zealand =

- Decades: 2000s; 2010s; 2020s
- See also: History of New Zealand; List of years in New Zealand; Timeline of New Zealand history

The following lists events that have happened or are expected to happen during 2026 in New Zealand.

== Population ==
- Estimated population as of 31 March – 5,361,300
- Increase since 31 March 2025 – 43,500 (0.8%)
- Males per 100 females – 98.5

== Incumbents ==
=== Regal and vice-regal ===
- Head of state – Charles III
- Governor-General – Dame Cindy Kiro
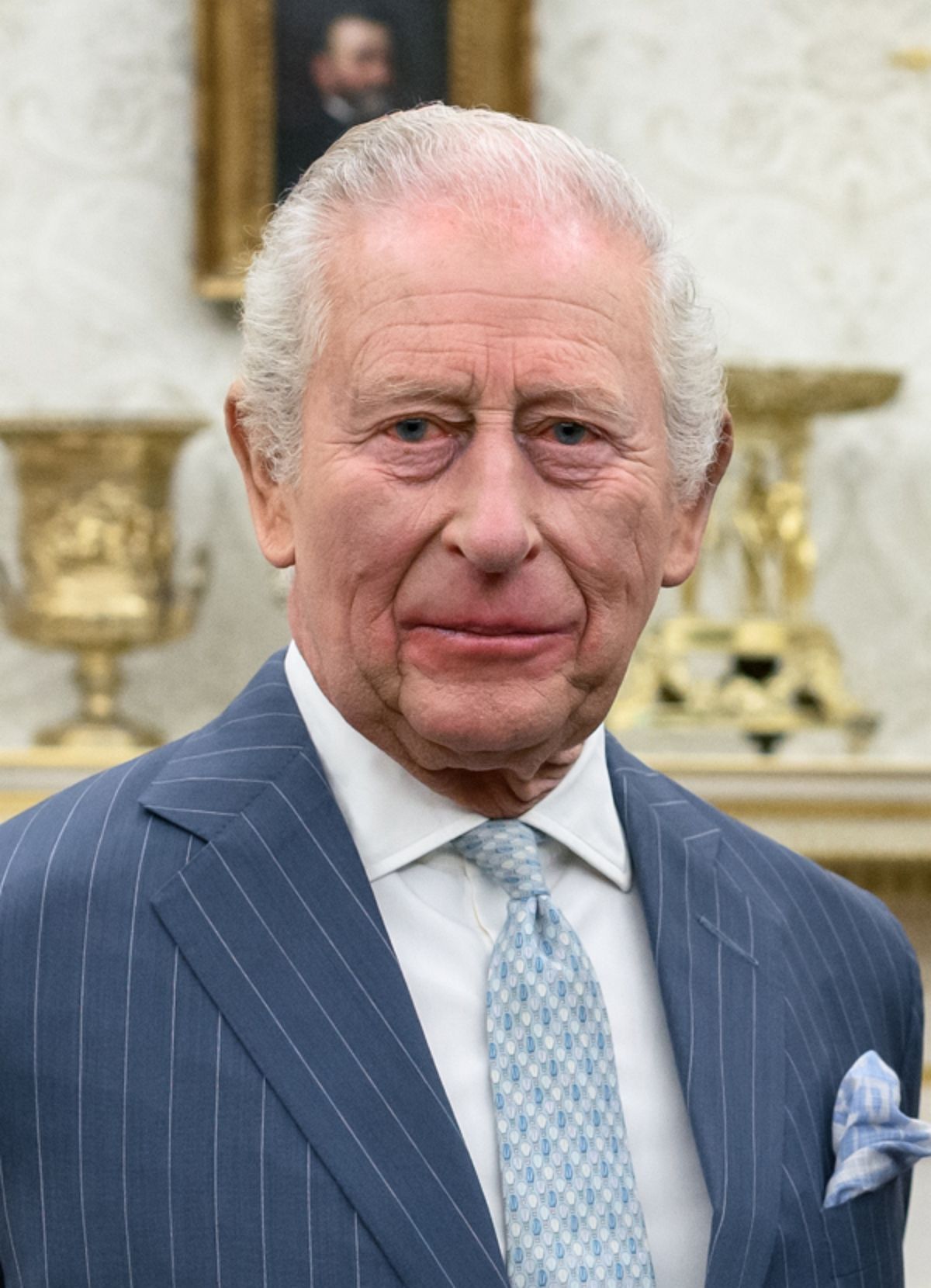
Charles III

Dame Cindy Kiro

=== Government ===
Legislature term: 54th New Zealand Parliament until 1 October

The Sixth National Government, elected in 2023, continues

- Speaker of the House – Gerry Brownlee
- Prime Minister – Christopher Luxon
- Deputy Prime Minister – David Seymour
- Leader of the House – Chris Bishop until 7 April, then Louise Upston
- Minister of Finance – Nicola Willis
- Minister of Foreign Affairs – Winston Peters
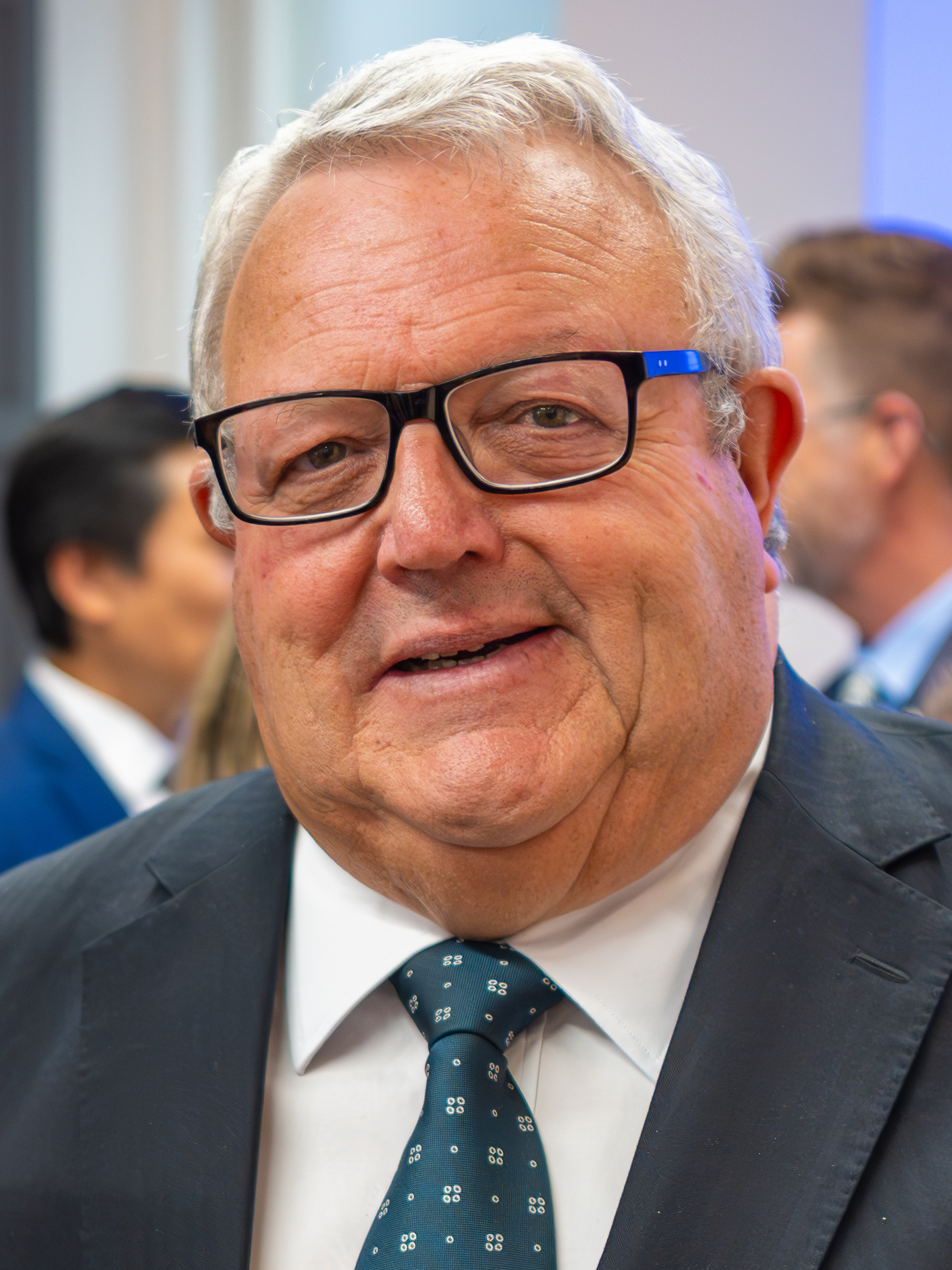
Gerry Brownlee

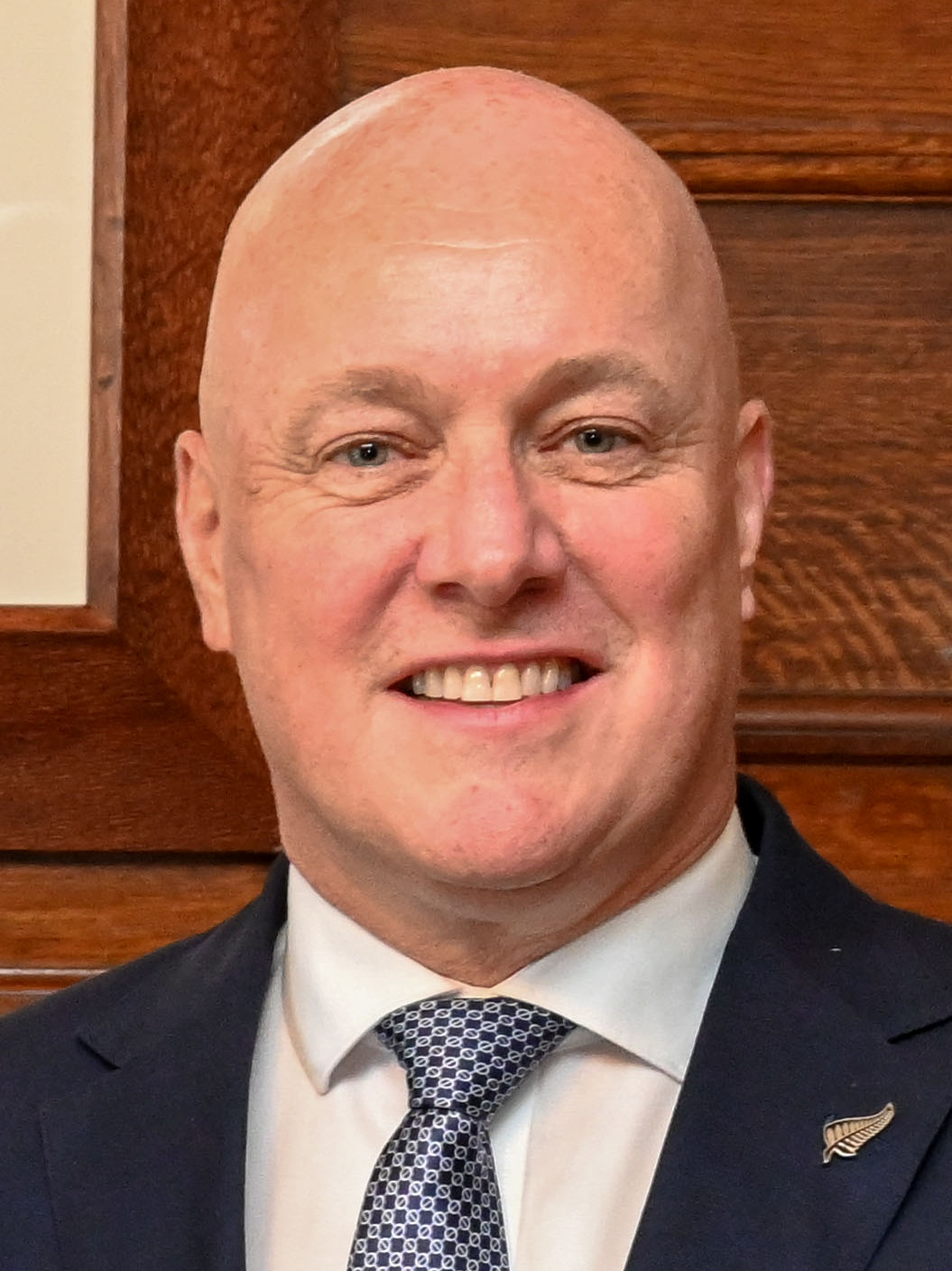
Christopher Luxon

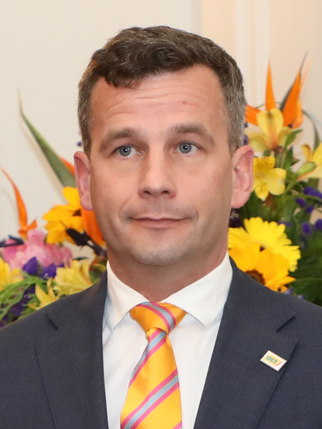
David Seymour

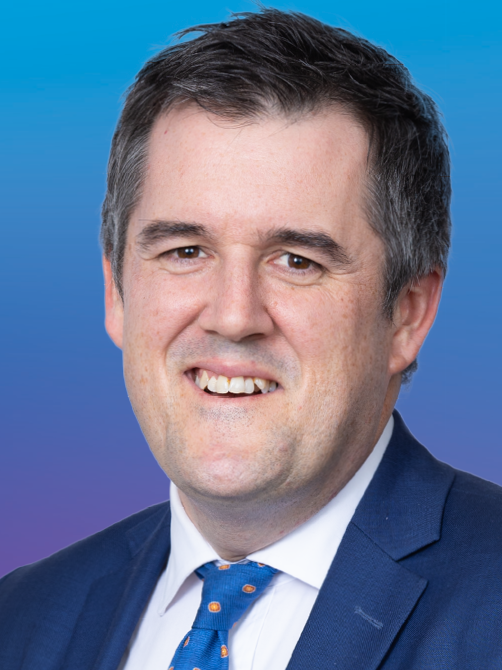
Chris Bishop

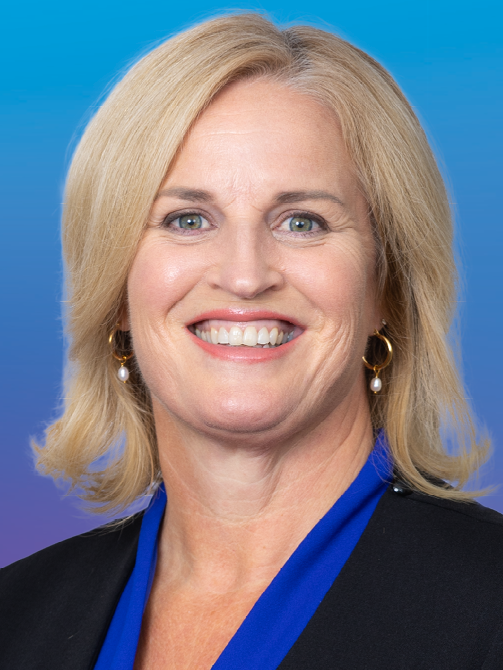
Louise Upston

Nicola Willis

Winston Peters

=== Other party leaders in parliament ===
- Labour – Chris Hipkins (Leader of the Opposition)
- Green – Marama Davidson and Chlöe Swarbrick
- ACT – David Seymour
- NZ First – Winston Peters
- Te Pāti Māori – Rawiri Waititi and Debbie Ngarewa-Packer
Chris Hipkins

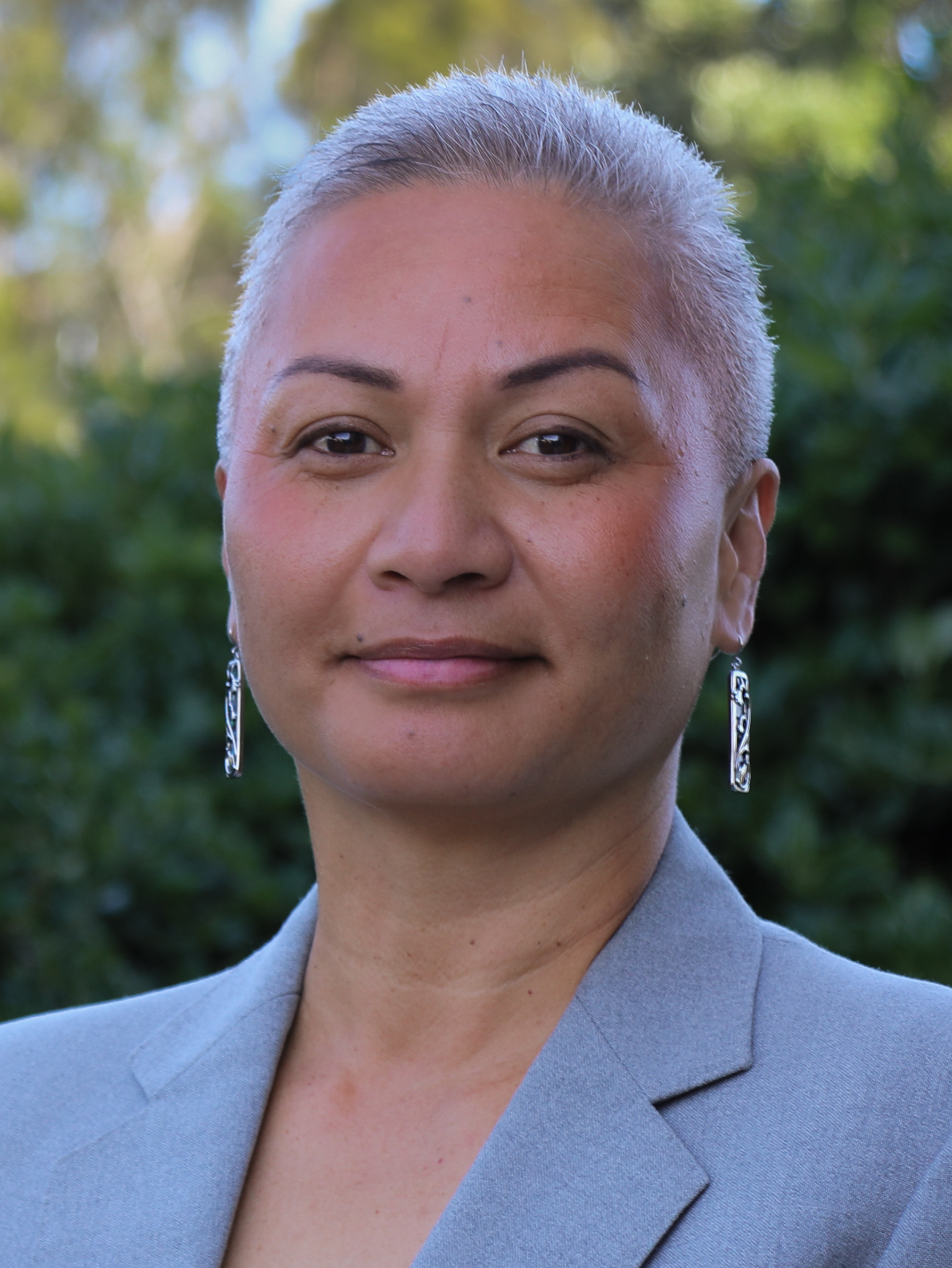
Marama Davidson

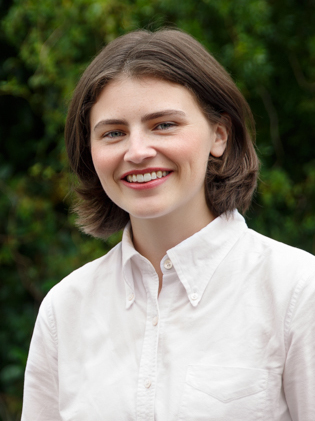
Chlöe Swarbrick

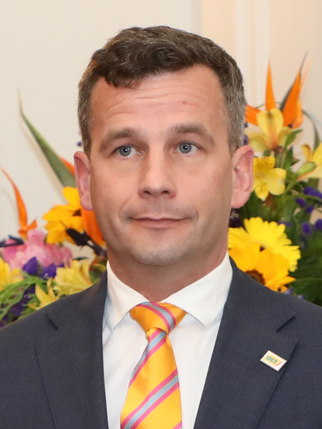
David Seymour

Winston Peters

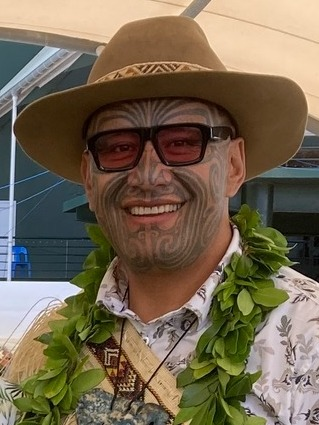
Rawiri Waititi

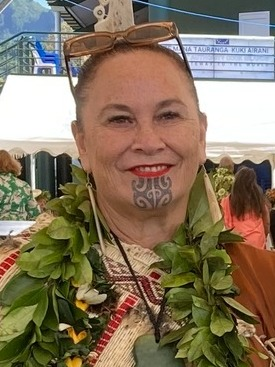
Debbie Ngarewa‑Packer

=== Judiciary ===
- Chief Justice – Helen Winkelmann
- President of the Court of Appeal – Christine French
- Chief High Court judge – Sally Fitzgerald
- Chief District Court judge – Heemi Taumaunu
Helen Winkelmann

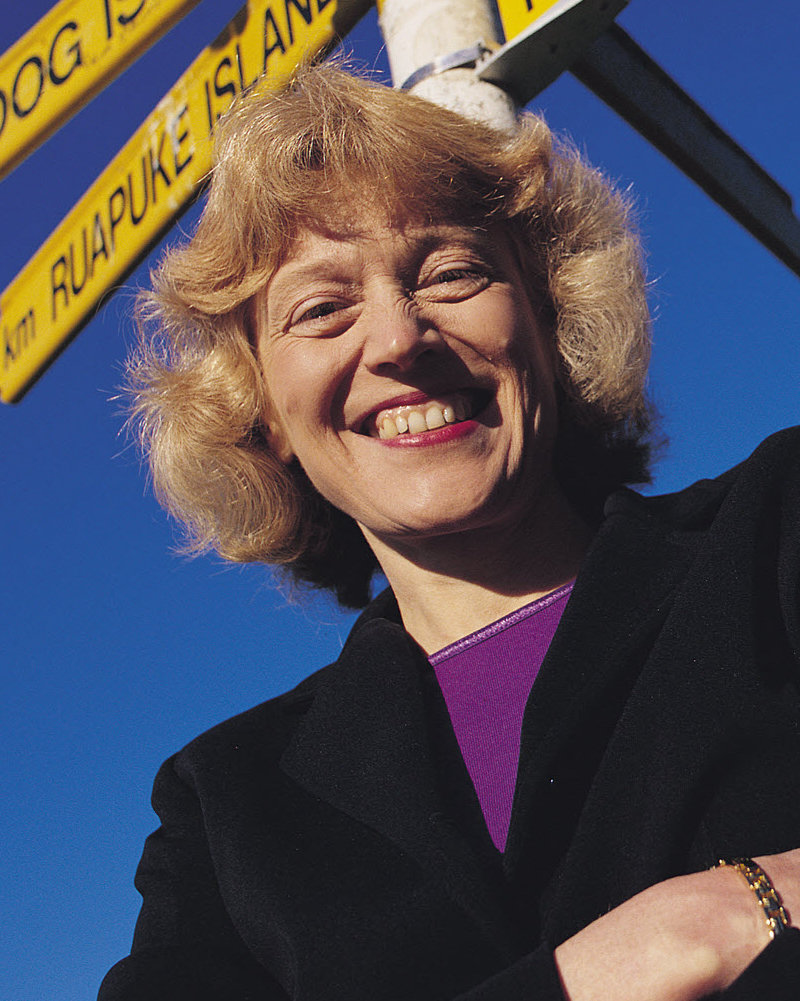
Christine French

Sally Fitzgerald

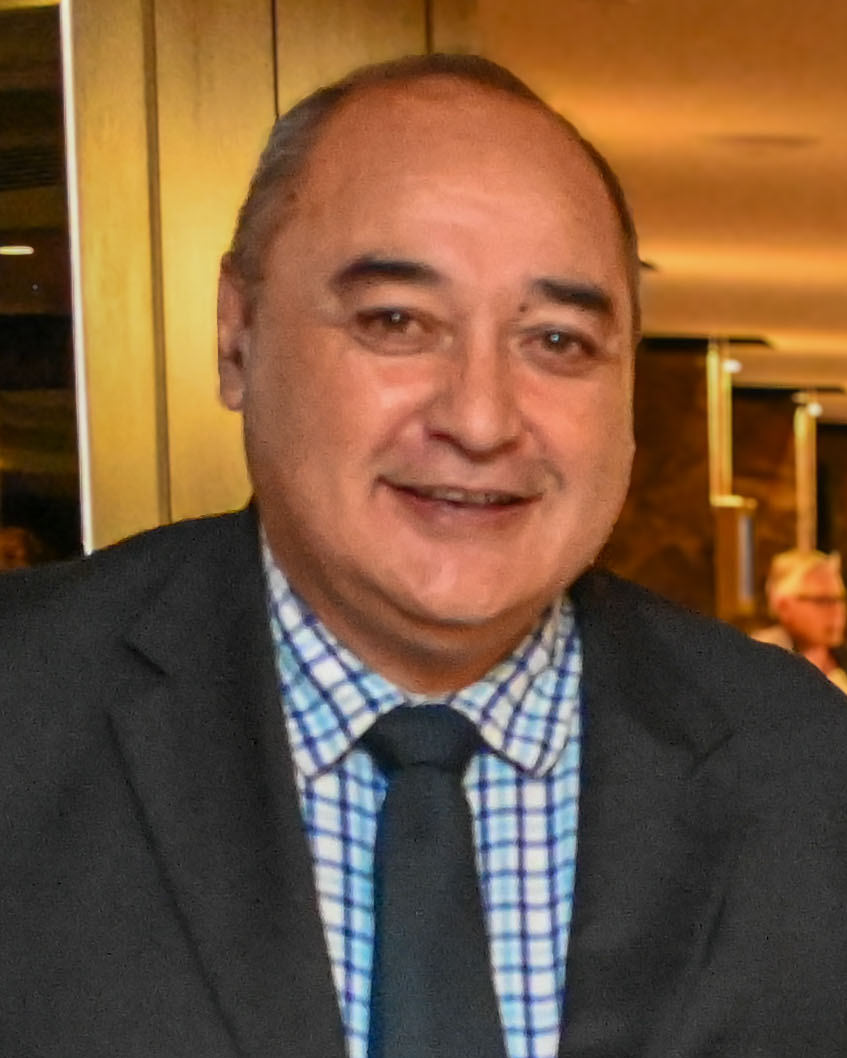
Heemi Taumaunu

=== Main centre leaders ===
- Mayor of Auckland – Wayne Brown
- Mayor of Tauranga – Mahé Drysdale
- Mayor of Hamilton – Tim Macindoe
- Mayor of Wellington – Andrew Little
- Mayor of Christchurch – Phil Mauger
- Mayor of Dunedin – Sophie Barker
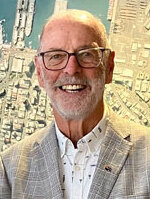
Wayne Brown

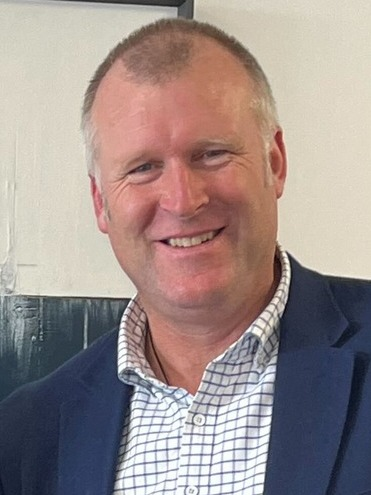
Mahé Drysdale

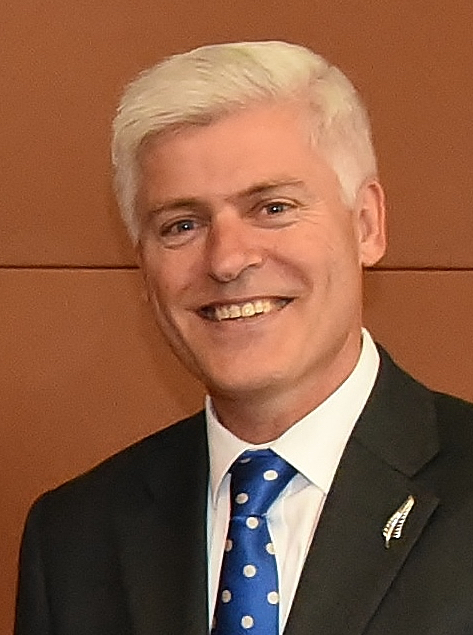
Tim Macindoe

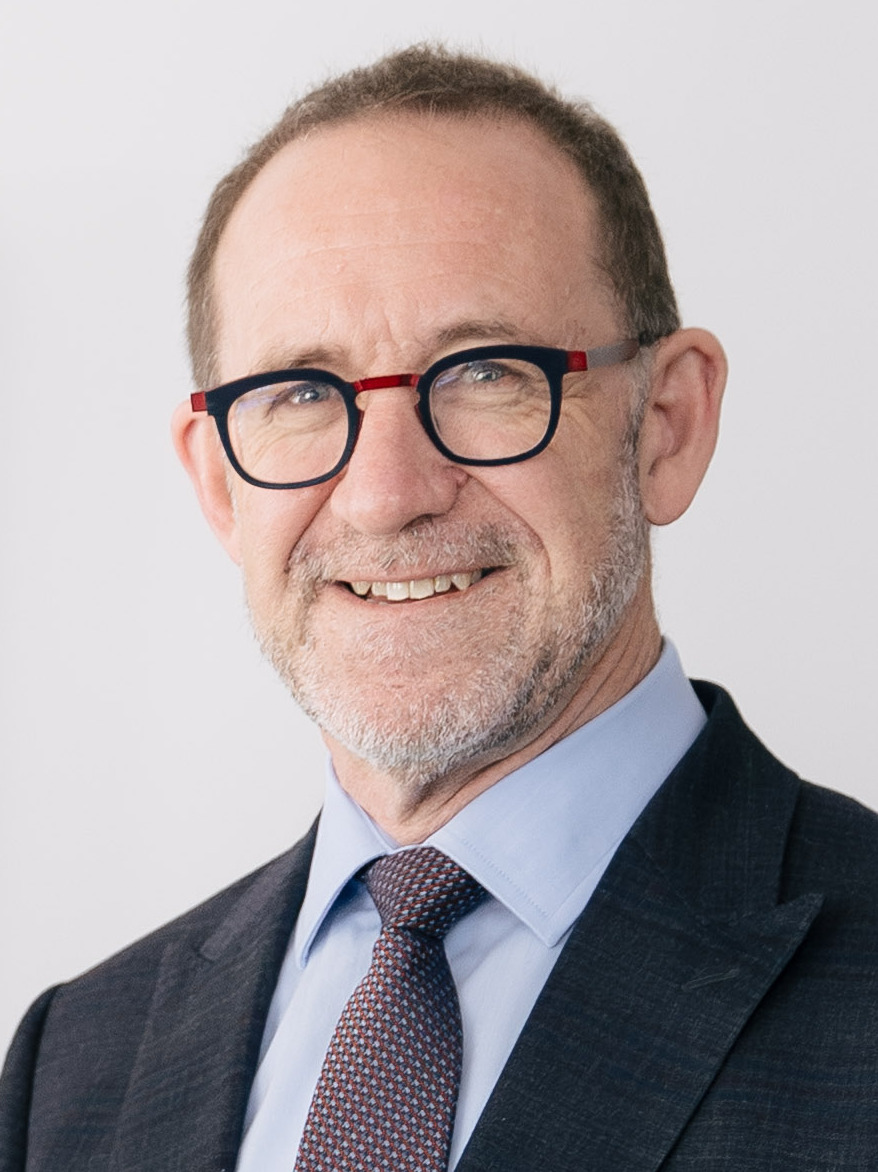
Andrew Little

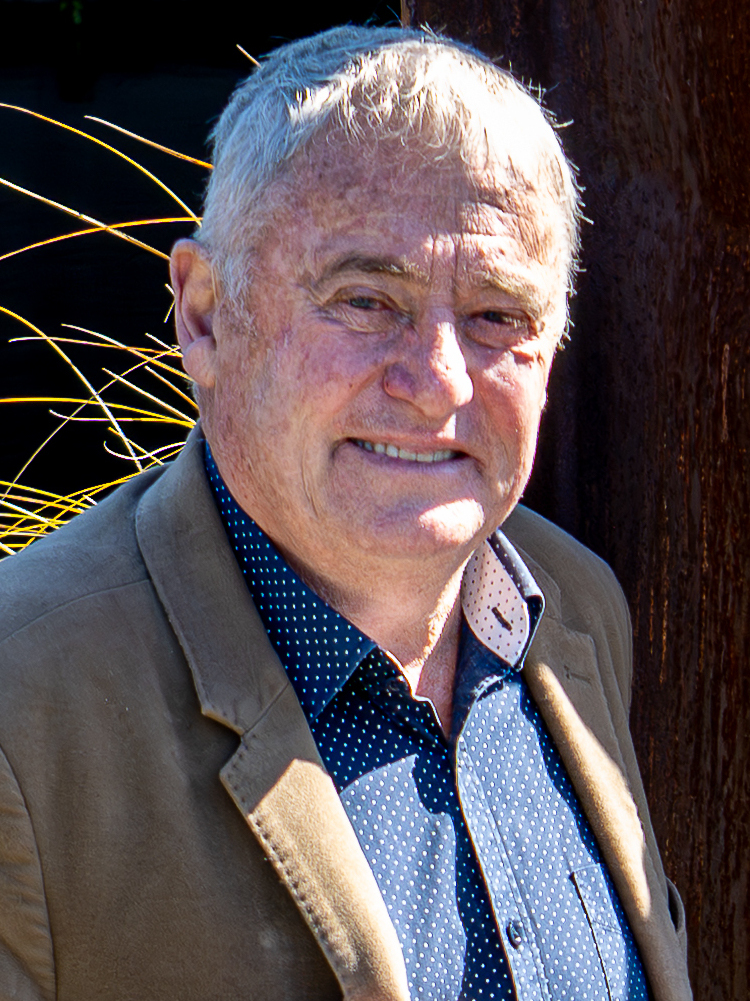
Phil Mauger

== Events ==
=== January ===
- 1 January – Manage My Health, provider of the country's biggest patient health information portal, confirms a data breach affecting "6–7 percent of the approximately 1.8 million registered users", around 120,000 people. The breach may have resulted from ManageMyHealth's outdated encryption software. A ransom demand for $60,000, for 108 GB of data, was reportedly made by a person or group named Kazu.
- 2 January:
  - Members of the New Zealand Professional Firefighters Union (NZPFU) stage a one-hour strike at mid-day as part of a pay dispute with Fire and Emergency New Zealand.
  - The Mayoral Relief Fund is activated for Horowhenua residents in response to recent windstorm damage in late December 2025.
- 3 January:
  - Heavy rain causes flash flooding in Wairoa. MetService issues heavy rain and severe thunderstorm warnings in the upper and eastern North Island. Overnight flooding in Tolaga Bay leads to the closure of State Highway 35 between Tolaga Bay and Okitu, and the evacuation of local residents.
  - Social networking website Neighbourly confirms that 150 GB of data including usernames, emails, GPS coordinates, posts and messages were stolen during a data breach that occurred on New Year's Day.
- 5 January – The High Court of New Zealand grants an injunction filed by ManageMyHealth to prevent third parties from accessing patients' data obtained during a recent data breach. Health Minister Simeon Brown commissions a review in response to the ManageMyHealth cyber security breach.
- 7 January – High Court Justice David Johnston issues an injunction preventing anyone from publishing stolen data from Neighbourly.
- 8 January:
  - The MV Connemara is forced to return to Wellington due to a mechanical fault with its ramp. Two hundred passengers are stranded overnight.
  - Fifty-five pilot whales are stranded on Farewell Spit in the upper South Island.
- 9 January:
  - The Department of Conservation reports that the critically endangered kākāpō started breeding previous week for the first time in four years.
  - A 5.4 magnitude earthquake strikes Waverley, Taranaki at a depth of 107km.
  - Members of the New Zealand Professional Firefighters Union stage a second one-hour strike at midday during an industrial dispute. The strike coincides with a fire in Pakuranga that destroys a grocery store.
  - Six pilot whales die on Farewell Spit. They were part of a pod of whales that had become stranded the previous day.
- 11 January – Fifteen pilot whales restrand themselves in Farewell Spit despite efforts by Project Jonah volunteers to refloat them, with two dying overnight.
- 12 January – Project Jonah volunteers euthanize the 13 remaining stranded pilot whales in Farewell Spit following five failed attempts to refloat them.
- 13 January – Protesters expressing solidarity with the 2025–2026 Iranian protests gather outside the Iranian Embassy in Wellington. Police monitor the protests and arrest two people for willful damage.
- 16 January – Heavy rain causes landslides in the Waioweka Gorge, trapping several commuters and leading to the closure of State Highway 2 between Mātāwai and Waioweka. Police and helicopters evacuate 40 people overnight.
- 18 January:
  - Heavy rain causes flooding, travel disruptions and landslides in parts of the Northland Region including the Whangarei District, east and south of Kawakawa and south of the Far North District.
  - About 100 people march in Army Bay in the Whangaparāoa Peninsula to protest against the depletion of sea life in local rock pools by recreational fishers.
- 19 January – Foreign Minister Winston Peters and Kiribati Vice-President Teuea Toatu sign a statement in Tarawa renewing New Zealand's aid assistance to Kiribati.
- 20 January – A preemptive state of emergency is declared in the Whangarei District in response to an approaching heavy rain front.
- 21 January:
  - Christopher Luxon announces the 2026 New Zealand general election will be held on 7 November.
  - A precautionary state of emergency is declared in the Thames-Coromandel District in response to expected heavy rain and flooding.
- 22 January – Several people are reported missing after a slip crashes into a Mount Maunganui camp-site, and two bodies are recovered after a slip damages a house in Welcome Bay, seriously injuring another person. Multiple roads are closed in the Thames-Coromandel District after widespread flooding and slips.
- 24 January – Police confirm the deaths of six missing people during a landslip at a Mount Maunganui campsite on 22 January.
- 27 January:
  - New Zealand Post announces that it plans to close 142 retail stores nationwide.
  - Sky Network Television signs an exclusive content sharing agreement with Paramount Skydance.
- 28 January:
  - Cabinet minister Judith Collins announces she will retire as an MP in the middle of the year.
  - The Tauranga City Council evacuates 150 people in Pāpāmoa in response to a new landslip.
- 29 January:
  - The governing National and opposition Labour parties agree to co-sponsor new legislation targeting modern slavery despite opposition from the ACT party.
  - The New Zealand Parliament passes legislation formalising the New Zealand Crown's Treaty of Waitangi settlement with Ngāti Hāua; which includes NZ$19 million worth of financial redress, the return of 64 culturally-significant sites and posthumous pardons for Mātene Rita Te Whareaitu and Te Rangiātea.
- 30 January:
  - Prime Minister Christopher Luxon and Foreign Minister Winston Peters confirm that New Zealand will not join US President Donald Trump's Board of Peace, which aims to oversee the reconstruction of Gaza.
  - Nine Entertainment acquires QMS, the owner of MediaWorks New Zealand, for NZ$986 million (A$850 million).
- 31 January:
  - EB Games shuts down all of its retail stores in New Zealand, followed by the expected closure of its distribution centre on 28 February.
  - The Destiny Church-affiliated The Freedoms & Rights Coalition and Eru Kapa-Kingi's Toitū te Aroha movement hold separate protests in Auckland. Police establish a cordon at the Fanshawe Street motor ramps to prevent Coalition protesters from marching onto the Auckland Harbour Bridge.
  - A Black Cat Cruises passenger vessel capsizes in Akaroa Harbour, leading to the evacuation of 38 passengers and three crew members. The Transport Accident Investigation Commission (TAIC) launches an investigation into the incident.

=== February ===
- 1 February:
  - A change to the Government's fees prescription policy comes into force. People can pay $5 co-payments for 12-monthly prescriptions instead of having to pay $5 for every single prescription.
  - General practitioners and nurse practitioners are able to diagnose adults with Attention Deficit Hyperactive Disorder (ADHD) and prescribe stimulant medicines.
- 2 February:
  - The New Zealand Government launches a new five-point student achievement grading system focusing on reading, writing and mathematics.
  - The Tauranga City Council votes to commission an independent external review into the Mount Maunganui landslide.
- 4 February:
  - Equipment failure at the Moa Point wastewater treatment plant cause 70 million litres of untreated wastewater daily to seep into Wellington's south coast waters. Local authorities issue a warning for people not to swim or collect seafood from these waters due to waste contamination.
  - Health New Zealand declares the end of the 2025 New Zealand measles outbreak, after 42 days had passed since the last confirmed case on 21 December 2025.
- 5 February – The fast-track approvals panel issues a draft decision declining Trans-Tasman Resources's application to mine the South Taranaki Bight for 30 years, citing credible risks to local fauna and concerns about sediment plume and noise levels. A final decision is expected on 18 March 2026.
- 9 February:
  - The Court of Appeal of New Zealand begins hearing convicted Christchurch mosque shooter Brenton Tarrant's appeal against his convictions and life sentence.
  - Georgie Dansey is elected as a list MP for the Labour Party following the resignation of Adrian Rurawhe.
  - The Government announces it would build a new liquefied natural gas import facility in Taranaki, which would be funded by a levy on electricity of between $2 and $4/MWh.
- 11 February:
  - The Government initiates a review of the Reserve Bank of New Zealand's decisions during the COVID-19 pandemic to lower the official cash rate to 0.25 and inject NZ$55 million worth of digital money into the New Zealand economy.
  - Former Member of Parliament Arthur Anae leads a delegation presenting a 45,000-strong petition to the New Zealand Parliament urging the Government to ease visa requirements for nationals of Pacific Islands countries. The delegation is received by Winston Peters.
- 12 February:
  - Health New Zealand abandons plans to charge market rates for hospital car parks.
  - Flight attendants affiliated with the Flight Attendants' Association of New Zealand and E tū unions launch a two-day strike, affecting several Air New Zealand flights.
- 13 February:
  - MetService issues an orange heavy rain warning for the Bay of Plenty east of Ōpōtiki and the Gisborne District north of Tolaga Bay. A yellow heavy rain warning is issued for the rest of the North Island.
  - The Hastings District Council issues an evacuation order for residents of the Clifton Motor Camp's campground near Cape Kidnappers due to a high landslide risk.
  - Food manufacturing company Talley's Group lodges an appeal at the Court of Appeal against a High Court ruling dismissing its defamation case against broadcaster TVNZ.
- 14 February:
  - 80 people are evacuated following flash flooding in the Ōtorohanga District. A local state of emergency is declared. Many road and highways in the district are flooded. The body of a man is recovered from a submerged car at Puketotara on State Highway 93.
  - A state of emergency is declared in the Waipā District following heavy rain and flash flooding.
  - The Christchurch City Council issues a boil water notice for several eastern Christchurch suburbs due to bacteria contamination in the Rawhiti water supply zone.
- 15 February:
  - Wellington Water chair Nick Leggett resigns following a major breakdown at the Moa Point sewage treatment plant on 4 February.
  - A state of emergency is declared in response to flash flooding in the Tararua District. Red heavy rain warnings are issued in the Manawatū, Rangitikei and Ruapehu Districts. Stormy weather also causes the cancellation of several Interislander and Bluebridge ferry services across the Cook Strait.
  - Members of the Rainbow Action Tāmaki group stage a protest at the 2026 Big Gay Out festival in Auckland to protest the presence of several government ministers including associate Health Minister Matt Doocey.
  - States of emergency are declared in the Manawatū, Rangitīkei, and Tararua District in response to heavy rain and flash flooding overnight. Heavy rain warnings are issues for Banks Peninsula and the Canterbury Plains.
- 16 February:
  - Train services and several flights are cancelled in the Wellington Region due to strong winds and a train collision with a fallen tree near Wairarapa.
  - 30,000 properties in the lower North Island including Manawatū-Whanganui and Wellington experience power outages due to strong winds toppling trees and power lines. Local authorities evacuate several homes in Masterton due to the threat of fallen trees.
  - The Government confirms it will launch an independent review into the Moa Point sewage plant failure that occurred on 4 February.
- 17 February
  - A state of emergency is declared throughout the Manawatū-Whanganui region in response to flash flooding.
  - Banks Peninsula and Christchurch experience heavy rain and flash flooding. A boil water notice is issued in Wainui after the local water supply is contaminated by flooding. A state of emergency is also declared in the Banks Peninsula.
  - Flooding destroys a single-lane bridge in the southern Wairarapa district, isolating several local settlements including Lake Ferry, Ngawi and Whāngaimoana.
  - Pharmacists affiliated with the Pharmacy Association of Professionals and Executive Employees (APEX) vote to accept a pay agreement with Health New Zealand that will lead to a 4.5% salary increase between 2026 and 2027.
  - Infrastructure Minister Chris Bishop releases the first "National Infrastructure Plan," which details 16 recommendations and 10 priorities for the next decade.
  - Parliament passes the Government's controversial Employment Relations Amendment Act 2026 which creates a new "gateway test" for differentiating between employees and contractors.
- 18 February:
  - A landslip in Dunedin's Musselburgh suburb leads to the evacuation of seven properties.
  - The Government scraps plans to hold a referendum on extending the parliamentary term from three to four years at the 2026 New Zealand general election.
- 19 February:
  - The Government reduces the number of proposed houses in its Auckland housing intensification plan from 2 million to 1.6 million following community pushback.
  - Trans-Tasman Resources withdraws its fast-track application to mine the South Taranaki Bight's seabed.
  - The fast-track approvals panel approves a new housing project in Queenstown's Homestead Bay.
- 20 February:
  - The avatar moth (Arctesthes avatar) is named the 2026 New Zealand Bug of the Year.
  - Local states of emergency are extended in the flood-stricken Wāipa and Ōtorohanga Districts for another seven days.
- 22 February – The New Zealand government confirms it will amend the Summary Offences Act 1981 to give Police new dispersal powers to remove rough sleepers and people displaying disorderly behaviour. While the Newmarket Business Association has supported the proposed policy, homeless people said that the policy does not address the lack of housing.
- 23 February – Christchurch mayor Phil Mauger lifts a local state of emergency in the Banks Peninsula.
- 24 February:
  - Health New Zealand declares two new cases of measles linked to overseas travel in Auckland. Three areas of interest including Waitakere Hospital and Auckland Airport are identified.
  - Digital medication management company MediMap confirms that its database was hacked on 22 February, with patients' data being altered resulting in significant disruption to aged care, hospice and disability providers. The company reports the privacy breach to the Privacy Commissioner.
  - A grass fire burns 20 hectares of land near Springvale in Central Otago, leading to the evacuation of several residents.
  - Prime Minister Luxon endorses the removal of Andrew Mountbatten-Windsor from the royal line of succession over his involvement in the Epstein scandal.
- 25 February:
  - The Government seeks public feedback on several proposed changes to road rules including allowing children under the age of 12 years to ride their bikes on footpaths and allowing e-scooters to ride on bike paths
  - The Public Service Association and Health New Zealand reach a pay agreement for allied health workers.
- 27 February:
  - The Commerce Commission's new disclosure rules for local councils and water service entities' spending, rates and plans under the Local Water Done Well policy come into effect.
  - Health New Zealand confirms a third case of measles linked to overseas travel in Auckland.

=== March ===
- 2 March – The New Zealand Defence Force confirms it will court martial three senior Royal New Zealand Navy officers including Commander Yvonne Gray over their role in the 2024 sinking of HMNZS Manawanui.
- 3 March – Former Gloriavale Christian Community leader Howard Temple, who pleaded guilty in 2025 to sexual offending against women and children, successfully appeals his two-year prison sentence, which is replaced by a period of home detention.
- 5 March:
  - Online auction website Trade Me announces a raft of changes including eliminating success fees for casual sellers and introducing a progressive service fee for buyers.
  - New Zealand deploys military assets, including two RNZAF aircraft, and crisis response teams to the Middle East to assist and evacuate its nationals.
- 7 March:
  - Sixty Iranian New Zealanders and their supporters stage a rally in Wellington's waterfront to raise awareness of the ongoing 2026 Iran war and the Iranian government's repression.
  - The Royal New Zealand Navy frigate HMNZS Te Kaha accidentally leaks 200–300 litres of oil into Akaroa Harbour due to a faulty starboard oil cooler.
- 8 March – Health New Zealand identifies 13 places of interest relating to a measles-infected traveller who visited New Zealand between 23 and 27 February including a New Zealand Parliament tour, Auckland Airport, Wellington Airport and several trains between Upper Hutt and Wellington.
- 10 March:
  - National Party MP and cabinet minister Shane Reti announces that he will retire from Parliament at the 2026 general election.
  - The second phase of the Royal Commission of Inquiry into COVID-19 Lessons Learned found that the New Zealand Government's response was "effective but late" and "poorly communicated." The Commission also found that the shift from an elimination to suppression strategy was problematic and criticised the length of the Auckland lockdown in late 2021.
  - High Court Justice Paul Radich orders Te Pāti Māori to reinstate MP Mariameno Kapa-Kingi's party membership.
  - The New Zealand Government confirms that it will not progress with plans to reverse the previous Labour Government's ban on live animal exports during the 54th New Zealand Parliamentary term, citing a lack consensus within the New Zealand Cabinet.
- 11 March – Food production company Heinz Wattie proposes major restructuring including closing three factories in Auckland, Christchurch and Dunedin, and scrapping numerous brands and products including Gregg's coffee. These cutbacks are expected to affect 350 jobs nationwide.
- 12 March:
  - A two-year ban on gathering shellfish from rock pools in the Whangaparāoa Peninsula, Kawau Bay and Ōmaha Bay comes into effect.
  - Residents of Burnside, Christchurch are evacuated by Police for a few hours after the discovery of a "high risk explosive substance."
  - The New Zealand Government releases six days' worth of petroleum following a global directive by the International Energy Agency to release 400 million barrels of petrol in response to supply disruptions caused by the 2026 Iran war.
- 17 March:
  - The Northland mudfish (Neochanna heleios) is named the 2026 New Zealand Fish of the Year.
  - Health Minister Simeon Brown announces that the New Zealand Government will invest an extra NZ$25 million to boost hospital capacity and staffing ahead of the winter months.
  - The Government appoints former Supreme Court justice Mark O'Regan as the chair of the New Zealand government's inquiry into the Mount Maunganui and Papamoa landslides which occurred during the January 2026 New Zealand storms.
- 20 March – Metro magazine confirms it will end regular print production and transition to becoming an online publication.
- 21 March:
  - Fitch Ratings downgrades New Zealand's economic outlook from stable to negative, while maintaining its AA+ rating.
  - The New Zealand Government orders a complete review of the Dog Control Act 1996 in response to a spate of violent dog attacks on people.
- 23 March – Telecommunications company One NZ finishes decommissioning its 2G and 3G network.
- 24 March:
  - Brooke van Velden announces her retirement from politics and that she will not be running for parliament in the 2026 New Zealand general election.
  - McCain ANZ announces that it would be closing its Hastings vegetable processing plant on 31 January 2027.
  - The New Zealand Government announces that about 143,000 working families with children will receive a $50 tax credit to help with rising fuel costs from 7 April. Another 14,000 families will also be eligible for a lower tax credit.
- 25 March:
  - Coroner Marcus Elliot rules that John Beckenridge most likely killed himself and his step-son Mike Zhou-Beckenridge in a "vengeful act" in 2015 against his estranged wife Fiona Lu.
  - MetService issues a red rain warning for parts of Northland, warning that areas east of Kaikohe and between Doubtless Bay and Whangārei will expect 320 mm of rain over the next 36 hours. The Whangārei District Council advises residents feeling unsafe to evacuate to higher ground.
- 26 March:
  - The Whangārei and Far North Districts declare local states of emergency in response to heavy rainfall and flash flooding. Parts of the upper North Island experience flash flooding, with Auckland and Northland receiving heavy rainfall.
  - High Court Justice Cheryl Gwyn rules in favour of the New Zealand College of Midwives' class action against the New Zealand Crown, finding that the latter had breached its contractual promise to ensure that midwives received "fair and reasonable" remuneration. The Ministry of Health announces it will appeal the ruling.
  - Stuff announces plans to close down its Petone printing press in 2027, affecting about 30 jobs.
- 27 March:
  - A subtropical storm sweeping through New Zealand brings heavy rain to several regions including Auckland, the Bay of Plenty, Gisborne District and Tasman District. 500 residents were evacuated from Kaitaia overnight due to flash flooding.
  - The New Zealand Government releases its four-level fuel alert level system in response to fuel shortages caused by the ongoing Iran conflict. The country is placed on the first phase, watchful, with the public advised to use fuel cautiously.
  - Heinz Wattie's confirms plans to close its factories in Auckland, Christchurch and Dunedin, and its frozen packaging lines in Hastings; affecting 300 roles.
- 30 March:
  - Protests against the New Zealand government's "move on" orders for homeless people are held in Auckland, Wellington and Tauranga.
- 31 March:
  - Spark New Zealand shuts down its 3G network.
  - The Supreme Court of New Zealand quashes David Tamihere's convictions for the murder of Urban Höglin and Heidi Paakkonen and orders a retrial, finding that part of the Crown's evidence against him was "concocted."
  - Juken New Zealand proposes closing its two timber mills in Kaitaia if it cannot find a buyer.

=== April ===
- 1 April:
  - The New Zealand Government lifts restrictions on support payments for disabled people and their carers from 1 April.
  - The New Zealand Parliament passes Kieran McAnulty's private member's bill allowing premises open on Good Friday, Anzac Day and Christmas Day to sell alcohol under normal license conditions.
- 2 April:
  - Prime Minister Christopher Luxon announces a cabinet reshuffle following the planned departures of cabinet ministers Judith Collins and Shane Reti leading up to the 2026 general election.
  - The New Zealand Government increases fuel subsidies for support workers from 63.5 cents to 82.5 cents per km for 12 months in response to rising fuel costs. The Government also confirms plans to recommission the diesel storage tanks at the Marsden Point Oil Refinery.
  - The High Court fines The Co-operative Bank the sum of NZ$2.48 million for overcharging 48,249 customers about NZ$7.2 million in "unreasonable fees" across a range of products.
- 6 April – A boil water notice is issued in the Auckland suburbs of Hillsborough, Mount Roskill, Royal Oak and Three Kings in response to the detection of E. coli in the water supply.
- 7 April – The New Zealand Government loans NZ$18.13 million loan to support the construction of a dam in Tukituki with the goal of boosting agricultural and horticultural production in the Hawke's Bay region.
- 8 April – Watercare Services lifts the boil water notice in the Auckland suburbs of Hillsborough, Mount Roskill, Royal Oak and Three Kings after testing finds no further traces of E. coli.
- 9 April:
  - Voting for the 2026 Ōtara-Papatoetoe Local Board by-election concludes and the preliminary results are released.
  - A boil water notice is issued for the Bell Block and The Links area of New Plymouth after the detection of E. coli in the water system.
- 10 April:
  - The Judicial Conduct Panel censures District Court Justice Ema Aitken for committing a "serious breach of comity" during a New Zealand First event at Auckland's exclusive The Northern Club in December 2024. The panel decides not to dismiss her from her position.
  - The Talley's Group proposes the closure of its Westport fish processing factory.
  - A precautionary state of emergency is declared in the Northland Region in response to the approaching Cyclone Vaianu.
- 11 April – Local states of emergency are declared in the Whakatāne District, Hawke's Bay, Waikato, Tauranga, and several districts in the Bay of Plenty in response to the approaching Cyclone Vaianu. Residents of properties along Ōhope's West End are ordered to evacuate by 5pm due to the risk of landslides and other severe weather events.
- 12 April:
  - The Greater Wellington Regional Council introduced contactless payment options alongside Snapper cards on public transportation, citing there were previously delays with the national ticket solution Motu Move. Adult bus and train fares are the same cost, with the exception of the Airport Express bus service, where Snapper will remain cheaper.
  - Cyclone Vaianu makes landfall in the North Island, moving through the Bay of Plenty towards Hawke's Bay. The cyclone causes strong winds and waves, and significant power outages in Northland, Tauranga, the Coromandel Peninsula and the Auckland Region. The entire North Island is placed under various rain and wind watches and warnings.
- 13 April – Cyclone Vaianu departs the North Island, after causing significant flooding, evacuations and power outages. States of emergency are lifted in most affected regions and districts except Whakatāne.
- 16 April:
  - Police arrest and charge a man with offensive behaviour and willful damage following the spraying of racist graffiti targeting Indian New Zealanders at Papatoetoe Central School.
  - High Court Justice Simon Mount issues a ruling that the New Zealand Superannuation Fund had failed to adequately address human rights issues when investing in several companies operating in the Occupied Palestinian Territories including Airbnb, Booking.com, Motorola and Expedia.
- 18 April:
  - Flooding in Porirua and Lower Hutt results in the evacuation of 26 homes and the temporary closure of a portion of State Highway 58.
  - The Chinese government lodges a diplomatic complaint alleging that a Royal New Zealand Air Force Boeing P-8 Poseidon violated its airspace over the Yellow Sea and East China Sea. The New Zealand Defence Force denies breaching Chinese airspace, stating that it was monitoring shipping near North Korea as part of a multinational sanctions enforcement team.
- 19 April – States of emergency are declared in Whanganui District and the Ōhura Ward of Ruapehu District due to flooding. A tornado in Tauranga causes damage to 15 properties.
- 20 April:
  - A state of emergency is declared in the Wellington Region due to flooding. Air New Zealand cancels all regional flights in and out of Wellington. Southern Wellington experiences over 70 mm (2.8 in) of rain over a 48-hour period, resulting in significant surface flooding.
  - Interislander and Bluebridge cancel ferry sailings for the next two days in response to strong winds and large swells in the Cook Strait.
  - The Hutt City Council orders an evacuation of residents in Wainuiomata in response to rising flood levels.
  - The New Zealand Government increase transport mileage rates for relief teachers for the next 12 months in response to the 2026 Iran war.
- 21 April – Prime Minister Christopher Luxon survives a confidence vote and remains the Leader of the National Party.
- 22 April – Governor-General Dame Cindy Kiro announces that the North Lawn at Government House Wellington will be renamed the Queen Elizabeth II Lawn, to mark the centenary of the birth of Queen Elizabeth II.
- 23 April – Labour Party leader Chris Hipkins confirms that his party will support the New Zealand Government's free trade agreement with India; giving the National and ACT parties the numbers in Parliament needed to enact the agreement into law. National's coalition partner New Zealand First has opposed the agreement due to concerns about its impact on immigration settings.
- 24 April – Te Kaha/One New Zealand Stadium holds its first sports match, with 25,000 attendees watching.
- 28 April:
  - The New Zealand–India Free Trade Agreement is signed in New Delhi, India.
  - The New Zealand government signs an agreement with petrol supply company Z Energy to obtain 90 million litres of diesel fuel.
- 29 April – Marlon Williams wins the 2026 Taite Music Prize.
- 30 April:
  - The Court of Appeal of New Zealand unanimously declines Brenton Tarrant's appeal against his murder convictions and life sentence for perpetrating the 2019 Christchurch mosque shootings.
  - The Talley's Group confirms plans to close its Westport fish processing factory, affecting 92 jobs.

=== May ===
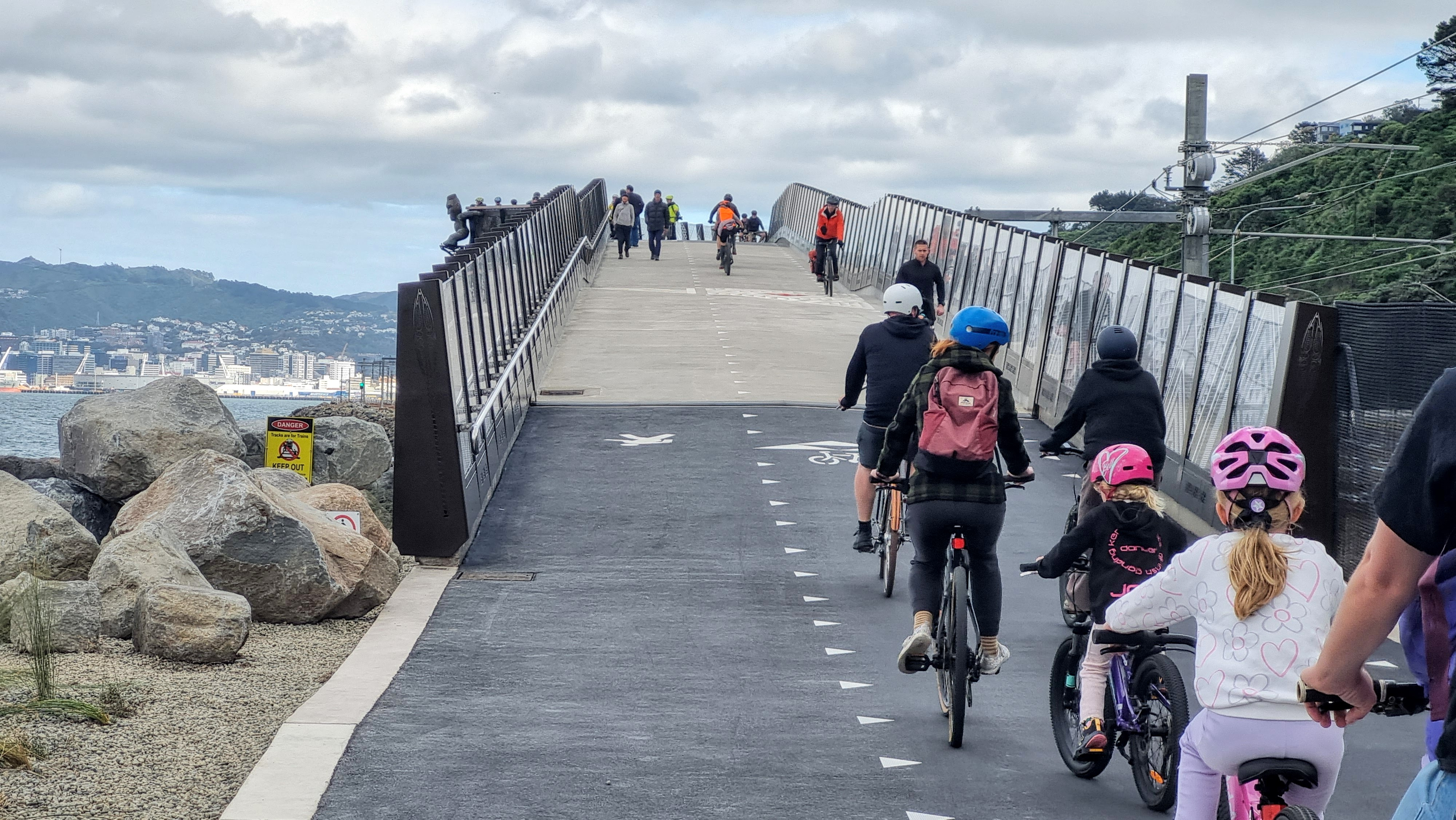
Te Ara Tupua, a cycleway and pathway connecting Lower Hutt and Wellington, opened on 16 May.

- 1 May:
  - A software issue causes widespread internet and phone call disruptions to One NZ and 2degrees customers throughout the South Island and lower North Island. The New Zealand Automobile Association closes its service centres in the South Island and lower North Island in response to internet network disruptions.
  - The Police decline to lay charges against anyone for helping fugitive Tom Phillips to evade capture, citing insufficient evidence.
  - A 61-year old man pleads guilty to two charges of intentionally damaging a footpath outside Papatoetoe Central School by spraying an anti-Indian graffiti.
  - The New Zealand Government abandons plans to establish a mine at a UNESCO World Heritage Site at Te Wāhipounamu in the West Coast Region.
- 2 May – E tū-affiliated workers at the Rio Tinto–owned Tiwai Point Aluminium Smelter vote to commence industrial action from 4 May in response to their employer's refusal to agree to a collective bargaining agreement with workers.
- 4 May:
  - The New Zealand Blood Service eases blood donation rules to allow more gay and bisexual men to donate blood products.
  - The New Zealand and Singaporean governments sign a bilateral "fuel for food" agreement to ensure a steady supply of essential goods in response to supply disruptions caused by the 2026 Iran war.
- 5 May – Local Government Minister Simon Watts and RMA Reform Minister Chris Bishop give local and regional councils a three-months timeframe to develop amalgamation plans.
- 6 May:
  - The Minister for Media and Communications Paul Goldsmith confirms that the Government will introduce legislation to disestablish the broadcasting regulator, the Broadcasting Standards Authority.
  - The Minister of Internal Affairs Brooke van Velden confirms that the Government will introduce a citizenship test for prospective New Zealand citizens from mid-2027.
- 8 May:
  - The Commerce Commission approves the merger of the fuel retailers Gull New Zealand and NPD.
  - New Zealand First leader Winston Peters and Finance Minister Nicola Willis confirm that the fees-free scheme for final year university students will be scrapped in the 2026 New Zealand budget.
  - Heavy rains and winds cause surface flooding and power outages nationwide, particularly the Tasman District, the West Coast Region, Christchurch, Taranaki and Whanganui. Police rescue six people who were trapped by flooding on State Highway 6 between Nelson and Blenheim.
- 11 May – Mariameno Kapa-Kingi leaves Te Pāti Māori to start her own party called the Te Tai Tokerau Party.
- 12 May:
  - A by-election triggered by the death of Dunedin City Councillor and former Mayor of Dunedin Jules Radich is held in Dunedin. Independent candidate Jo Galer wins the by-election.
  - The New Zealand Government announces that it will amend existing climate legislation to prevent companies from being sued over damages caused by greenhouse gas emissions. The law change will apply to current and future cases including iwi leader Mike Smith's 2024 lawsuit against dairy giant Fonterra and five other major emitters.
- 14 May – A bill is introduced to Parliament that would give Police power to issue "move-on" orders to rough sleepers and people displaying "disorderly behaviour" in public.
- 15 May:
  - The Waitangi Tribunal's interim report finds that the New Zealand Government's proposed overhaul of Treaty clauses in education law constituted a breach of the Principles of the Treaty of Waitangi, and urges the Government to abandon work on such legislation and consult with Māori.
  - The New Zealand government allocates NZ$212 million to continuing the Healthy School Lunches programme for the 2027 school year. Associate Education Minister David Seymour indicates that the government will make changes to the programme for the 2028 school year.
  - The New Zealand Nurses Organisation votes to accept a collective agreement with Health New Zealand after two years of negotiations.
  - 200 students take part in a School Strike for Climate march outside the New Zealand Parliament urging the Government to reinstate the ban on oil and gas exploration, introduce free public transport for under-25 year olds, lower the voting age to 16 years, recognise Palestine and scrap the fast-track consenting regime.
- 16 May:
  - The Petone to Ngauranga section of cycling and walking path Te Ara Tupua is opened by Minister of Transport Chris Bishop after the project began in 2022.
  - Prime Minister Christopher Luxon and Education Minister Erica Stanford announce further changes to the Government's National Certificate of Educational Achievement replacements, including making science compulsory for Year 11 students, mandating exams across all subjects, and replacing aggregate credits with a score count of subjects and grades.
- 18 May:
  - Hayden Tasker is convicted of the murder of Senior Sergeant Lyn Fleming, the first New Zealand policewoman to die in the line of duty.
  - The New Zealand Government announces it will allocate $131 million from the 2026 New Zealand budget into boosting literacy and mathematics for primary and intermediate children.
- 19 May – Finance Minister Nicola Willis announces that the Government will seek to lay off 8,700 public sector jobs and merge several government departments by mid-2029.
- 20 May:
  - Police arrest 14 corrections personnel at the Mount Eden Correctional Facility and the Serco-run Auckland South Corrections Facility as part of a wider operation against criminal activity in prisons.
  - New Zealand Petroleum and Minerals, the government's minerals regulator, declines a mining permit application by Australian mining company Siren Gold to mine Sams Creek in Golden Bay / Mohua.
- 24 May – Hundreds of protesters attend a rally in Wellington organised by the Public Service Association to protest the New Zealand government's planned public service cuts and increased use of artificial intelligence.
- 26 May:
  - The Crimes Legislation (Stalking and Harassment) Amendment Act 2025 comes into effect, making stalking a criminal offence under New Zealand law.
  - The Waitaki District Council votes to raise rates to 22% during an extraordinary meeting.
- 27 May:
  - Education Minister Erica Stanford abandons plans to legislate new restrictions to homeschooling in New Zealand following opposition from the National Council of Home Educators, the Government's ACT and New Zealand First coalition partners, and the opposition Labour, Green and Māori parties.
  - The Reserve Bank of New Zealand maintains the official cash rate at 2.25%, with Governor Anna Breman using her casting vote to break a deadlocked vote on the bank's Monetary Policy Committee.
  - Parliament passes legislation disestablishing the Ministry for the Environment and transferring its statutory functions to the new Ministry of Cities, Environment, Regions and Transport (MCERT).
- 28 May:
  - The 2026 New Zealand budget is released by Finance Minister Nicola Willis.
  - The 2026 Aotearoa Music Awards are held at the Civic Theatre in Auckland. Marlon Williams wins three awards, and makes history when Te Whare Tīwekaweka becomes the first entirely te reo Māori album to win Album of the Year.
  - Sri Lanka establishes a new high commission in Wellington.
- 29 May – Parliament passes urgent legislation allowing the Ministry of Social Development to use artificial intelligence to make decisions regarding people's welfare benefits.

=== June ===
- 1 June:
  - The 2026 King's Birthday Honours are announced.
  - The New Zealand Government raises English language requirements for Accredited Employer Work Visa holders and easing Active Investor Growth visa requirements to include philanthropic contributions.
- 2 June – Local Government Minister Simon Watts announces that the New Zealand Government will introduce legislation to stop non-elected members of local and regional councils from voting on council committees.
- 3 June – The Chinese Government bans four New Zealand Members of Parliament–Maureen Pugh, David Wilson, Laura McClure and Duncan Webb–from visiting China for a year after they visited Taiwan in May 2026 as part of a cross-party parliamentary delegation. The Chinese government has expressed opposition to foreign governments having contact or relations with the Taiwanese government in line with its One China policy.
- 6 June – A Johnsonville Line train derails, injuring eight people.
- 8 June – Wellington mayor Andrew Little declares a state of emergency in the city's southern and eastern wards in response to heavy swells. Residents of Owhiro Bay, Island Bay, Houghton Bay and Breaker Bay are ordered to evacuate by 9am on 9 June.
- 9 June – The local state of emergency in Wellington's southern and eastern wards is lifted in the evening.
- 11 June – The Ruapehu District Council issues a "do not drink" notice in Waiouru following a power outage in the town's water treatment plant.
- 12 June:
  - Waiouru's "do not drink" notice is lifted.
  - New Zealand joins the United States in voting against the International Labour Organization's decision to adopt binding employment standards for gig workers working in sectors such as ride-hailing and food delivery.
  - A fire breaks out at a Wellington Airport terminal, causing travel disruptions and leading to the evacuation of the southwest pier and main terminal building.
- 13 June – About 10,000 LGBTQ-rights protesters gather in five cities including Wellington to oppose the Government's proposed Legislation (Definitions of Woman and Man) Amendment Bill.
- 15 June – Foodstuffs's new Club+ loyalty programme is launched across its Pak'nSave, New World and Four Square supermarkets, replacing their separate loyalty programmes.
- 16 June:
  - Warner Bros. Discovery launches HBO Max as a standalone streaming service in New Zealand.
  - The Public Service Commission and the Ministry of Business, Innovation and Employment (MBIE) launch separate investigations into allegations that MBIE and Immigration New Zealand officials misled Immigration minister Erica Stanford and her predecessors about a failed NZ$33 million biometric border security project between 2018 and 2025.
  - Australian retailer Lincraft confirms plans to close its six physical stores in New Zealand as part of a shift towards online retailing.
- 17 June – The Financial Markets Authority fines the Bank of New Zealand $2.6 million for misleading customers about how interest is calculated on some non-profit accounts.
- 18 June – The Wellington City Council votes to discontinue work on the $139 million Golden Mile pedestrianisation project.
- 20 June – Strong winds and high temperatures in Canterbury and Marlborough lead to several wildfires. Fire and Emergency New Zealand respond to at least nine wildfires.
- 22 June – Prime Minister Christopher Luxon apologises to the family of an 11-year old Māori autistic girl who was detained and sedated by Police and medical staff after being mistaken for a 21-year old female patient in March 2025. Luxon also confirmed the Government would launch a review into the incident.
- 23 June – The Waitaki District Council lowers their proposed rates increase from 22% to 17% following strong public opposition.
- 24 June – Associate Immigration Minister Casey Costello announces that the Community Organisation Refugee Sponsorship scheme would be made permanent from July 2026 and would be expanded to 200 spaces per annum from 2027.
- 25 June:
  - The Independent Police Conduct Authority (IPCA) and the Police National Integrity Unit launch separate investigations into two allegations of misconduct against women by Police Commissioner Richard Chambers.
  - Hundreds of protesters gather in Oamaru to urge the Waitaki District Council to lower their proposed rates increase from 17% to 7%.
- 26–27 June – Strong winds and torrential rain cause travel disruptions, power outages and surface flooding throughout the lower North Island including Wellington, Wairarapa and the Manawatū District. On 26 June 200 flights are cancelled at Wellington Airport while 7,000 properties experienced power outages on 27 June. 460 Wairarapa households were left isolated after flooding seriously damaged the Tūranganui Bridge.

=== July ===
- 1 July:
  - Tiaki Wai assumes the functions and responsibilities of the water services entity Wellington Water.
  - The Ministry for Cities, Environment, Regions and Transport (MCERT) comes into existence through the amalgamation of the Ministry for the Environment, the Ministry of Housing and Urban Development, and the Ministry of Transport. MCERT also assumes the local government functions of the Department of Internal Affairs.
  - The Court of Appeal of New Zealand dismisses Internet entrepreneur Kim Dotcom's appeal against the New Zealand's bid to extradite him to the United States to face charges for copyright violations.
  - The New Zealand Parliament passes legislation reversing 2015 workplace safety legislative changes that were passed following the 2010 Pike River Mine disaster.
- 3 July – Health New Zealand orders the closure of Wakari Hospital's forensic intellectual disability unit "ward 10A" after an inspection by Chief Ombudsman John Allen in March 2026 found "compelling evidence of punitive and coercive treatment" of ward patients.
- 4 July – MetService issues several heavy rain, snow, and wind warnings for parts of the Canterbury, Otago, and Southland regions. A heavy snow warning is issued for Otago (except coastal Otago) and northern Southland until 6 July. MetService also issues a heavy rain watch for mainland Southland (except northern Southland) above 400 metres for 24 hours from the night of 4 July.
- 5 July – MetService issues a red heavy rain warning for Dunedin and the Clutha District. By nighttime, surface flooding is reported in parts of coastal Otago including South Dunedin, Milton, Waikouaiti and Middlemarch. Mosgiel's wastewater system is overwhelmed by flooding.
- 6 July – Mayor of Waitaki Mel Taverndale declares a state of emergency in the Waitaki District in response to heavy rain and surface flooding in Oamaru. 20 people were evacuated in Oamaru overnight while Fire and Emergency New Zealand responded to 41 emergency calls. The wet weather also triggered landslides in Oamaru. Locals criticise the Waitaki District Council for poor communication.
- 7 July:
  - The Kaikoura District Council declares a state of emergency after the Kowhai River breached its banks. Over 130 people are evacuated from low-lying areas.
  - The Supreme Court of New Zealand quashes the murder convictions of two men who were convicted in 2021 of a 1987 cold case murder at a Maramarua pub, ruling that there was no credible evidence to prove that the defendants were at the scene of the crime.
- 8 July:
  - Wet weather leads to landslides and home evacuations in the Otago peninsula and Oamaru.
  - The Reserve Bank of New Zealand raises the official cash rate (OCR) to 2.5%, marking the first time since the OCR has been lifted since May 2023.
- 9 July – A state of emergency is declared in Wairoa after the banks of the Wairoa River burst overnight. Dozens of Wairoa residents were evacuated overnight.
- 10–11 July – Indian Prime Minister Narendra Modi undertakes a state visit to New Zealand, marking the first visit by an Indian Prime Minister to the country in 40 years.
- 13 July – The South Island Main Trunk's Main North Line between Christchurch and Picton reopens after closing last week due to stormy weather.
- 15 July:
  - Juken New Zealand confirms plans to close its wood veneer mill in Northland by 21 August after failing to sell off the mill. The mill's closure is expected to affect 60 jobs.
  - The first confirmed case of the H5 bird flu is reported in a brown skua found at Petone Beach in Wellington. In response, the Department of Conservation announced that it would vaccinate 300 "vulnerable" native birds.
- 16 July – A magnitude 5.9 earthquake struck 40km north of Te Anau at 9:14 PM at a depth of 53km. The National Emergency Management Agency (NEMA) advises residents living between Milford Sound and Puysegur Point on the West Coast Region to evacuate immediately due to a tsunami risk. NEMA subsequently cancelled its tsunami advisory shortly before midnight.
- 17 July:
  - The New Zealand government confirms it will launch a probe into why Civil Defence's website broke down during the Te Anau earthquake that occurred last night.
  - The second confirmed case of the H5 bird flu is reported in a native swamp harrier in Wairarapa.
- 21 July – Local authorities in Tuakau evacuate 15 homes after the local wastewater system was contaminated by an unspecified "hazardous substance."
- 22 July – Internet connectivity issues affect five hospitals in the Waikato Region for 11 hours, leading to the cancellation of 68 appointments and 15 theatre operations at Waikato Hospital.
- 23 July – An overnight cloudburst causes surface flooding and a landslip in the Grey District.
- 24 July:
  - The United States imposes new 12.5% tariffs on New Zealand and 59 other countries as part of an international move to combat alleged forced labour in supply chains. These replace the Liberation Day tariffs, which have been invalidated by an earlier Supreme Court ruling.
  - Hayden Tasker is sentenced to life imprisonment with a non-parole period of 22 years for the Murder of Lyn Fleming.
- 25 July – A strong magnitude 5.9 earthquake strikes Taumarunui in the early hours of the morning, causing some property damage. The earthquake is felt throughout the North Island. The earthquake caused damage to water infrastructure in Ohakune.
- 27 July – Spark New Zealand reorganises into two divisions: a Connectivity division responsible for core telephone and IT services, and a separate Digital Services division.
- 28 July — The New Zealand Parliament passes the Arms Act 2026a, which becomes the new regulatory framework for firearms in New Zealand.
- 29 July:
  - The New Zealand Government grants a 12-year petroleum exploration permit to Australian company EnZed Energy; the first exploration permit granted since the reversal of the 2018 ban on oil and gas exploration by the previous Labour government.
  - The New Zealand Government agrees to accept "in some form" all 63 recommendations of the two inquiries of the Royal Commission of Inquiry into COVID-19 Lessons Learned.
  - The New Zealand Government rejects calls to ban the public sale of fireworks.
  - The New Zealand Parliament passes the Government's new Employment Leave Bill which bases employees' annual and sick leave in direct proportion to their standard work hours.
- 30 July – The New Zealand Parliament passes the English Language Act 2026, which designates the English language as one of New Zealand's three official languages.
- 31 July:
  - Christchurch City Holdings rejects an unsolicited proposal by a consortium consisting of global port operator DP World and three Ngāi Tahu rūnanga to lease the operations of Lyttelton port.
  - The Waitangi Tribunal criticises the New Zealand Government's plan to review references to the Treaty of Waitangi across 19 laws.
  - A 4.6 magnitude earthquake occurs 30km northwest of Porirua at 11:09pm.

=== August ===
- 1 August:
  - Legislation banning greyhound racing in New Zealand comes into effect.
  - Jane Searle succeeds Claire Achmad as the Children's Commissioner.
  - A light 5.2 magnitude earthquake occurs 35 km northwest of Te Anau at 3:23 pm.
- 2 August – A strong magnitude 5.7 earthquake occurs 10 km southwest of Te Araroa at 8:35pm.
- 3 August:
  - Snowy weather leads to road and school closures in Dunedin. Other centres including Wellington and Christchurch also experience snowfall, the snowfall in Wellington being its first since the 2011 New Zealand snowstorms.
  - High winds and strong swells lead to the cancellations of ferry services across the Cook Strait.
- 5 August – New Zealand's unemployment rate rises to 5.6%, reaching an 11-year high.
- 6 August – The New Zealand Parliament passes the Crimes Amendment Bill, which creates new offenses for assaulting first responders and coward punching, raises penalties for shoplifting and human trafficking, and expands citizen's arrest powers.
- 9 August – Deadline for local councils to submit their Head Start proposals for amalgamation. 48 councils have submitted proposals while 17 have declined to participate in the consultation process.
- 12 August:
  - Prime Minister Luxon survives a second confidence vote. Defence Minister Chris Penk is stripped of his ministerial portfolios for challenging Luxon's leadership of the National Party.
  - The Australian broadcasting company Sports Entertainment Group agrees to buy New Zealand commercial broadcaster MediaWorks New Zealand for NZ$130 million.
- 16 August – Buy now, pay later company Zip Co exits the New Zealand market.
- 18 August:
  - Parliament unanimously passes legislation entrenching the Nelson Tenths settlement into law.
  - Parliament passes the Government's contentious Climate Change Response (Tort Liability) Amendment Bill, which prevents lawsuits against companies for climate changing-emissions under tort law.
- 19 August – An independent review by retired High Court Justice Paul Davidson concludes that the January 2026 Mount Maunganui landslide was a "preventable tragedy".
- 21 August – A by-election triggered by the death of Greater Wellington Regional Council deputy chairperson and Wairarapa constituency councillor Adrienne Staples is held. Independent candidate John Hart wins the by-election.
- 22 August – A wildfire near Albert Town leads to the evacuation of 22 homes.
- 23 August – Strong winds cause power outages and travel disruptions across both the North and South Islands.
- 24 August – The National-led coalition government introduces legislation into Parliament to ban people under the age of 16 from accessing social media. The coalition ACT New Zealand and New Zealand First parties express disagreement with the proposed law.
- 27 August – Heavy rain overnight leads to flooding in Queenstown, resulting in the evacuation of 45 residents.
- 28 August – A historic meeting of the leaders of the four constituent members of the Realm of New Zealand to discuss constitutional arrangements is held in Auckland. This meeting is attended by Prime Minister Luxon, Ulu-o-Tokelau Alapati Tavite, Niue Prime Minister Dalton Tagelagi, and Cook Islands Prime Minister Mark Brown.
- 31 August – The New Zealand government delays plans to raise fuel excise taxes until 2028.

=== September ===
- 1 September – State pharmaceutical provider Pharmac makes flu vaccines for children under five years old free in response to rising flu cases nationwide.
- 2 September – The Reserve Bank of New Zealand increases the official cash rate by 25 basis points to 2.75%.
- 3 September — The New Zealand Parliament passes legislation tightening the welfare benefits criteria for teenagers aged 18 and 19-years old based on a parental income test.
- 9 September:
  - Richard Naish is awarded the NZIA Gold Medal for 2026.
  - Public servants affiliated with the Public Service Association strike nationwide to protest against the Government's proposed public sector job cuts and to demand inflation-adjusted pay rises.
- 13 September – Auckland's City Rail Link opens to the public.
- 16 September:
  - Prime Minister Luxon apologises to the children of the fugitive father Tom Phillips and their mother Cat after an inquiry identified serious shortcomings in the responses of several government agencies including the New Zealand Police and Oranga Tamariki in preventing the children's disappearance and rescuing them.
  - Parliament passes legislation directing local government bodies to focus on delivering core services and limiting council voting to elected members.
- 17 September – Parliament passes two separate laws implementing the New Zealand–India Free Trade Agreement and empowering the Youth Court of New Zealand to send youth offenders to Military Style Academies.
- 18 September – Parliament passes legislation empowering Police to issue "move-on" orders in response to begging, rough sleeping, disorderly behaviour and obstructing businesses.
- 19 September:
  - Parliament passes legislation easing earthquake strengthening rules in most of New Zealand, including the upper North Island and the Chatham Islands.
  - Thousands of protestors opposed to the Government's proposed Conservation Amendment legislation march through Auckland.
- 21 September – The black robin is named Bird of the Year.
- 22 September:
  - Gloriavale Christian Community's charitable arm is stripped of its charitable status by the Charities Registration Board due to "serious wrongdoing" including the use of child labour and failing to report sexual crime.
  - Parliament passes the Planning and Natural Environment Acts replacing the Resource Management Act 1991 as the country's main legislative framework for infrastructural and environmental regulations.
  - An independent review commissioned by the Government found that the Reserve Bank of New Zealand was too slow to raise interest rates during the COVID-19 pandemic in New Zealand, resulting in record high inflation.
- 24 September:
  - The Government pauses making decisions on its local government reforms until after the 2026 New Zealand general election.
  - A fast-track approvals panel rejects mining company Bathurst Resources's application to mine Denniston Plateau on the West Coast Region.
- 25 September – The Waitangi Tribunal finds that the New Zealand Crown had failed to develop an alternative Māori health plan after it dissolved Te Aka Whai Ora (the Māori Health Authority) in late February 2024.
- 29 September:
  - Woolworths New Zealand confirms plans to cut 130 customer care jobs in Auckland in order to centralise customer care operations in Sydney.
  - The Auckland Council votes to shift from postal voting to in-person voting at the 2028 New Zealand local elections.
- 30 September – Dutch environmentalist group Both ENDS files a complaint against New Zealand with the European Commission for allegedly breaching the climate change provisions of the EU–NZ free trade agreement. The group's complaint was supported by several New Zealand groups and individuals including Greenpeace New Zealand, the Environmental Law Initiative, Mike Smith and University of Auckland law Professor Jane Kelsey.

=== October ===
- 1 October:
  - The Greater Wellington Regional Council files criminal charges against both the Wellington City Council and water services provider Tiaki Wai over their handling of the Moa Point wastewater spillage in February 2026.
  - The 54th New Zealand Parliament is formally dissolved.
  - Four new road rules allowing children to ride bicycles on footpaths, e-scooters to use cycle lanes, requiring drivers to give way to buses exiting bus stops, and motorists to give cyclists, horse riders and other road users a 1.5 metre passing gap come into effect.
- 2 October – A pod of pygmy killer whales become stranded on Ninety Mile Beach in the Far North District. By the following day, at least 12 to 15 whales have died despite efforts by volunteers, iwi and conservation staff to refloat them.
- 6 October:
  - A large wildfire breaks out on the southern shores of Lake Wakatipu in the early hours of the morning, fanned by strong winds.
  - The New Zealand Government and local government bodies sign the Otago Central Lakes Deal, a ten-year plan to improve infrastructure and healthcare in Central Otago.
  - Name suppression is lifted for Private Jack Captein, the former New Zealand Army soldier who was convicted in August 2025 of attempted espionage.
- 7 October:
  - The New Zealand Crown decides not to seek a retrial against David Tamihere, whose convictions for the Murder of Urban Höglin and Heidi Paakkonen were quashed by the Supreme Court of New Zealand in February 2026.
  - A wildfire on the southern shores of Lake Wakatipu spreads to cover 1,200 ha (3,000 acres) due to strong winds and dry conditions.
- 8 October
  - Firefighters contain the wildfire near Lake Wakatipu after it had devastated 1,350 ha (3,300 acres) of tussock and scrubland over a three day period.
  - Police find the body of Braydon Hepworth in Hereford Street, Christchurch, where he had been missing since 3 September.
- 12 October – Pakaraka School becomes the first state school in New Zealand to convert to a charter school.
- 13 October – New Zealand joins Paraguay in abstaining from a non-binding vote at the United Nations General Assembly supporting global pandemic prevention, preparedness and response, citing a need to test the resolution against a "national interest test."
- 16 October – Spark New Zealand confirms plans to remove all remaining public phone booths over the next two years, citing a lack of "commercial viability."
- 20 October – The New Zealand–India Free Trade Agreement comes into effect.
- 21 October:
  - The National Library of New Zealand and Archives New Zealand confirm plans to lay off 45 jobs as part of a restructuring process, amounting to 11 percent of their workforce.
  - The High Court rules that the Government's 2025 regulations banning new puberty blocker prescriptions prescriptions for children and young people with gender dysphoria were unlawful.
  - Over 8,000 university and polytechnic workers affiliated with the Tertiary Education Union go on strike to protest pay conditions and job security.
- 22 October – 140 TVNZ journalists and staff go on strike for the first time in 20 years to protest pay conditions.
- 23 October:
  - The Chief of Defence Force, Air Marshal Tony Davies, resigns after admitting to engaging in an "inappropriate relationship" while in a command role.
  - Fire and Emergency New Zealand chief executive Kerry Gregory resigns after Minister of Internal Affairs Brooke van Velden declined to express confidence in his leadership.
- 25 October — Gunfire during a military exercise in the Waiouru Defence Area causes a wildfire that engulfs almost 3,840 ha (9,500 acres) by 27 October.
- 26 October – "Move-on orders" allowing Police to disperse beggars, rough sleepers, and people acting disorderly from public spaces come into force.
- 28 October – The Reserve Bank of New Zealand retains the official cash rate at 2.75% following a split 4–3 vote by the Monetary Policy Council.
- 29 October – Firefighters, New Zealand Defence Force and Department of Conservation personnel contain a wildfire in Waiouru which had broken out on 25 October and engulfed 3,700 ha (9,100 acres).
- 30 October:
  - The Waitangi Tribunal finds that the New Zealand Crown breached the Treaty of Waitangi by stripping school boards of their Treaty obligations.
  - The Dunedin City Council votes by a majority to hold a referendum on whether to retain the Single Transferrable Vote (STV) voting system or to revert to the First Past the Post (FPTP) system during the 2028 New Zealand local elections.
  - The Otago Regional Council launches a review of a controversial consent granted by the Queenstown Lakes District Council for contractor SJ Allen Holdings to dump treated human waste from Wanaka on farmland near Lauder.

=== November ===
- 1 November:
  - The New Zealand government ends welfare assistance to 18- and 19-year olds whose parents earn over NZ$67,225.
  - New Warrant of Fitness regulations extending registration renewals for one year to two years for new vehicles come into force.
  - The Government announces that it will invest $3.4 million for a 12-month trial to restore Mainlander passenger rail services to Christchurch and establish more frequent train services between Christchurch, Dunedin and Invercargill.
- 4 November – The unemployment rate rises to 5.7%, marking an 11-year high. About 4,000 jobs are lost in the last quarter.
- 6 November – Forty-three pilot whales die during a mass stranding along the Ngawi coast in the south-eastern North Island.
- 7 November – 2026 New Zealand general election: No party wins a majority in parliament, with the New Zealand National Party winning a plurality of 42 seats. The Opportunity Party enters the New Zealand Parliament for the first time.
- 9 November:
  - Public broadcaster Radio New Zealand proposes slashing 58 jobs by March 2027 after reporting a record NZ$11.8 million deficit.
  - Police confirm an arrest has been made in relation to a long-running investigation into the Baby Ru homicide case, which occurred on 22 October 2023.
- 10 November:
  - Police charge a 33-year old man and 28-year old woman with perverting the course of justice in relation to the 2023 death of "Baby Ru."
  - Academic members of the Tertiary Education Union at the University of Canterbury launch a partial strike by withholding releasing student grades during a pay dispute with the University.
- 12 November:
  - Over 300 staff affiliated with the Workers First Union at The Warehouse Group's distribution centres in Auckland and Christchurch commence strike action to protest against the use of surveillance artificial intelligence and over job security.
  - DarkSky International designates Fiordland National Park as the largest international Dark Sky Park in the Southern Hemisphere.
  - A fast-track approvals panel approves plans to build the Southern Link inland port near Mosgiel.
- 14 November – The Moa Point wastewater treatment plant resumes operations after months of repair. In February 2026, a breakdown at the plant caused extensive pollution to Lyall Bay.
- 16 November — The Ministry of Business, Innovation and Employment (MBIE) agrees to a record $251,000 settlement with the online magazine National Business Review for the unauthorised sharing of paywalled stories among its employees.
- 17 November:
  - Radio New Zealand staff in Auckland and Wellington, along with representatives of the E tū union and Public Service Association hold lunchtime protests against proposed cuts to 58 jobs at the public broadcaster following a NZ$11.8 million deficit.
  - Fire and Emergency New Zealand ends controversial restructuring plans which proposed laying off 140 jobs and changing 700 roles. The New Zealand Professional Firefighters Union welcomed the decision and aborted plans to launch two ten-hour strikes on 27 November and 2 December.
- 18 November — Conservation organisation Forest & Bird's database was hacked, with supporters' personal information and contact details being accessed. The incident was reported to the Privacy Commissioner.
- 19 November:
  - The Commerce Commission files charges against national carrier Air New Zealand for breaching the Fair Trading Act by allegedly misleading customers about compensation for flight disruptions that were within the airline's control.
  - High Court Justice Paul Radich rules that the New Zealand Government breached women's rights when it scrapped several pay equity claims through the passage of the Equal Pay Amendment Act in 2025.
  - 19 sperm whales die after becoming stranded at Ninety Mile Beach. The Department of Conservation, local iwi and marine mammal specialists attend to five beached whales that were part of the same pod.
- 20 October:
  - Awanui Labs workers affiliated with the Association of Professionals and Executive Employees (Apex) union call off remaining strike action following mediation by the Employment Relations Authority.
  - The New Zealand Defence Force confirms that several of its websites including a database associated with the Force4Families Defence Discounts scheme were breached in a cybersecurity incident during the week. This breach was reported to the Privacy Commissioner.

=== Predicted and scheduled ===
- 30 November - Kapiti Coast Airport is expected to close despite local opposition, with plans to redevelop the site for residential housing.
- 7 December – The last episode of the Māori current affairs show The Hui is expected to air. The show's production company Great Southern Television announced the series' cancellation after the Māori broadcasting funding agency Te Māngai Pāho declined further funding due to budgetary constraints.
- 31 December – The 2027 New Year Honours will be announced.

== Holidays and observances ==
Public holidays in New Zealand in 2026 are as follows:

- 1 January – New Year's Day
- 2 January – Day after New Year's Day
- 6 February – Waitangi Day
- 3 April – Good Friday
- 6 April – Easter Monday
- 25 April – Anzac Day
- 27 April – Anzac Day observed
- 1 June – King's Birthday
- 10 July – Matariki
- 26 October – Labour Day
- 25 December – Christmas Day
- 26 December – Boxing Day
- 28 December – Boxing Day observed

== Sport ==
=== Association football ===
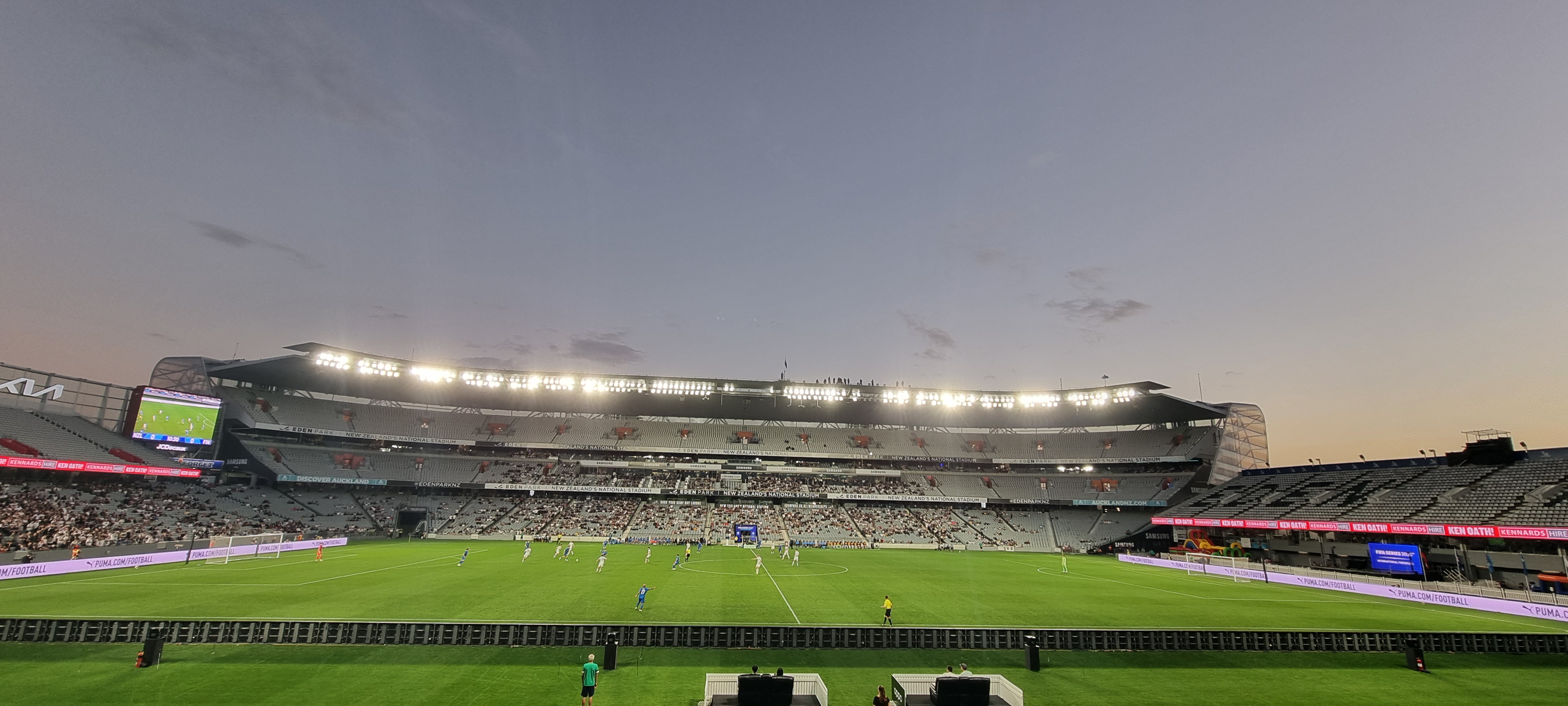
Football match between New Zealand and Finland on 27 March 2026 at Eden Park, Auckland

Men's

- 27–30 March – New Zealand hosts its first ever FIFA Series competition with the All Whites finishing in second place out of four teams, following a 2–0 loss to Finland and a 4–1 win over Chile. The latter result was New Zealand's first ever win over a South American national team.
- 15–26 June – The All Whites participate in the 2026 FIFA World Cup. Following one draw and two losses, the New Zealanders exited the tournament after the conclusion of the group stage.

Women's

- 15 April – The Football Ferns defeat Papua New Guinea 1–0 in the final match of the Oceania qualification campaign, thereby qualifying for the 2027 FIFA Women's World Cup.

=== Commonwealth Games ===
A New Zealand team of 112 competitors participates in the 2026 Commonwealth Games, 23 July – 2 August.

Gold	Silver	Bronze	Total
10	14	12	36

=== Cricket ===
Men's

- 8 March – New Zealand loses to India in the final of the 2026 Men's T20 World Cup.
- 29 June – The Blackcaps defeat England 2–1 in a test series in England to win the Crowe–Thorpe Trophy for the first time. This was New Zealand's first series win away from home against the English since 1999.

Women's

- 27 June – Despite coming into the 2026 Women's T20 World Cup as reigning champions, the White Ferns exited the tournament following the group stage's conclusion, after 2 wins and 3 losses.

=== Golf ===
- Daniel Hillier wins the New Zealand Open, becoming the first New Zealander to win the title since 2017.
- Ryan Fox wins the 2026 Open Championship at the Royal Birkdale Golf Club in Southport, England. Fox became the third man from New Zealand to win a major championship, after Bob Charles and Michael Campbell.

=== Horse racing ===
==== Harness racing ====
- New Zealand Cup – Leap To Fame
- Rowe Cup – Mr Love

==== Thoroughbred racing ====
- Auckland Cup – Paradise Storm
- New Zealand Cup – Just Charlie
- Wellington Cup – Manzor Blue

=== Lawn bowls ===
- Men's singles champion – Rohan Ware (Belfast Bowling Club)
- Men's pair champions – Ethan Kelleher and Hamish Kelleher (Halswell Bowling Club)
- Women's singles champion – Mandy Boyd (Elmwood Park Bowling Club)
- Women's pair champions – Mandy Boyd (Elmwood Park Bowling Club) and Kirsten Edwards (Stoke Bowling Club)

=== Olympics ===
New Zealand sent a team of 17 athletes across three sports to the 2026 Winter Olympics, held in northern Italy from 6 to 22 February.

Gold	Silver	Bronze	Total
0	2	1	3

=== Paralympics ===
A New Zealand team of two athletes in alpine skiing competed at the 2026 Winter Paralympics, held in northern Italy from 6 to 15 March. Adam Hall won a silver medal in the men's slalom (standing) event.

Gold	Silver	Bronze	Total
0	1	0	1

=== Rowing ===
- New Zealand Secondary School Championships (Maadi Cup)
  - Maadi Cup (boys' U18 eight) – King's College
  - Levin Jubilee Cup (girls' U18 eight) – Waikato Diocesan School for Girls
  - Star Trophy (overall points) – Waikato Diocesan School for Girls

=== Rugby league ===
- 15 October – The Men's Rugby League World Cup began with New Zealand playing away to Australia at Sydney Football Stadium in Sydney, Australia. New Zealand then played at home versus the Cook Islands on 25 October and against Fiji on 31 October. In the knockout stage of the tournament, New Zealand defeated Tonga in the semifinal before succumbing to Australia 32–12 in the final.
- 16 October – The Women's Rugby League World Cup took place in Australia, New Zealand, and Papua New Guinea (PNG). New Zealand played in Group B against Fiji, France, and PNG, defeating each in the process. New Zealand then won against Samoa in the semifinal before losing to Australia 34–10 in the final.
- 30 October – The Wheelchair Rugby League World Cup took place in Australia. New Zealand was placed in Group B with matches against Australia, France, and Scotland. New Zealand lost all three matches and were eliminated in the group stage.

=== Rugby union ===
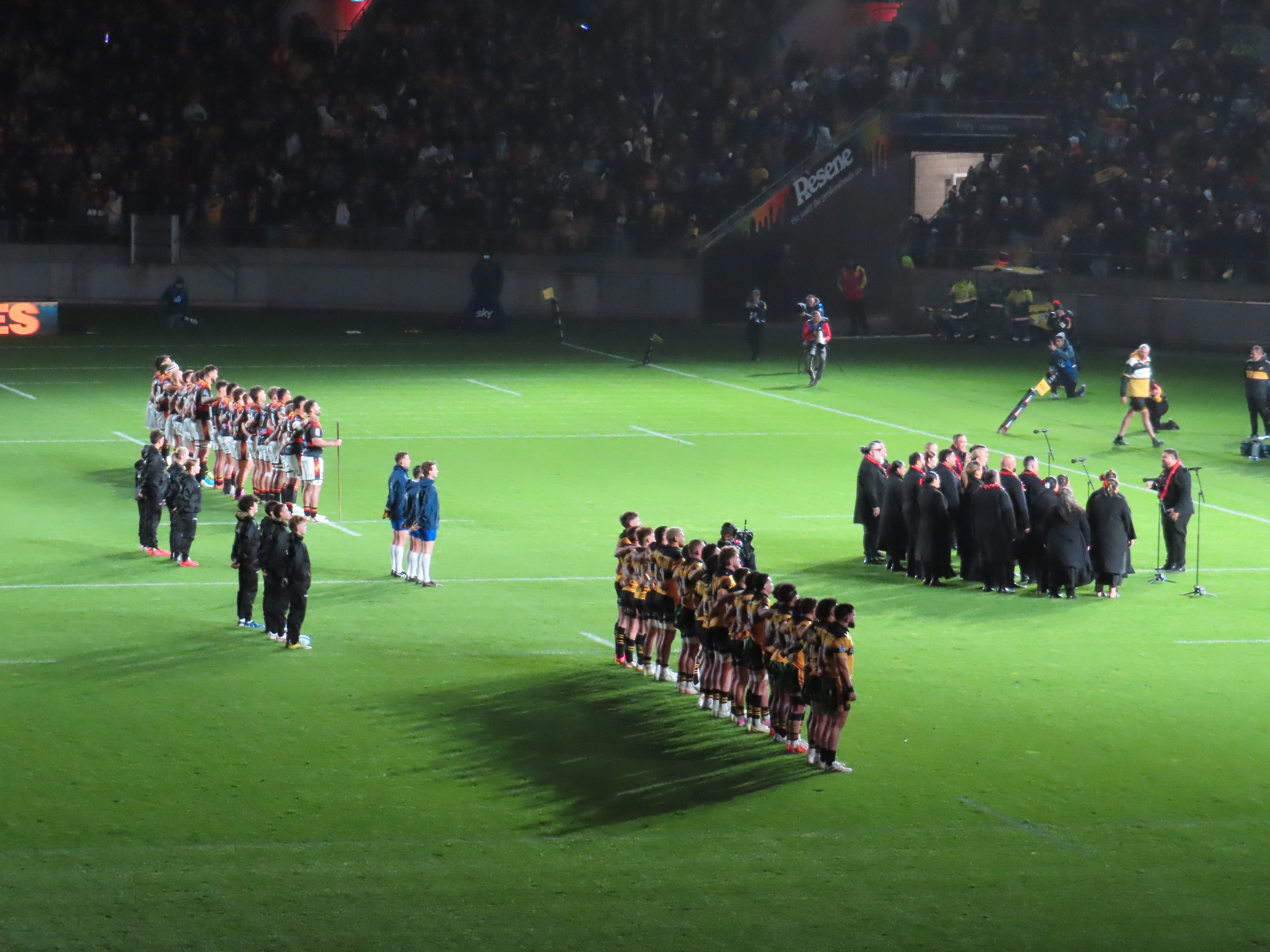
Pre-match lineup at the 2026 Super Rugby Pacific final on 20 June at Hnry Stadium, Wellington.

- 14 April – Rugby team Moana Pasifika announces plans to disband at the end of the 2026 Super Rugby Pacific season due to financial challenges. New Zealand Rugby confirms it is exploring options of keeping the club financially sustainable.
- 20 June – The Hurricanes won the 2026 Super Rugby Pacific title, defeating the Chiefs emphatically in the final to win their second Super Rugby championship.
- 24 June – New Zealand Rugby confirms the dissolution of Moana Pasifika following a failed joint bid by the Samoan and Tongan governments to save the rugby franchise.
- 7 August – 12 September – The All Blacks tour South Africa, with four matches against provincial sides and four test matches against the Springboks. The final test took place in Baltimore, United States. The Springboks won the series 3–1.

=== Sailing ===
- Auckland hosted the second round of the 2026 SailGP championship on 14–15 February. On 14 February, two sailors including New Zealander Louis Sinclair were injured when the French and New Zealand yachts collided during a high speed chase.

=== Shooting ===
- Ballinger Belt – Mike Collings (Te Puke)

=== Tennis ===
The ASB Classic tournament was held in Auckland, 5–17 January.

- Women's singles – Elina Svitolina
- Women's doubles – Guo Hanyu / Kristina Mladenovic
- Men's singles – Jakub Menšík
- Men's doubles – Theo Arribage / Albano Olivetti

== Deaths ==
=== January ===
- 1 January:
  - Dame Karen Poutasi, public health administrator and public servant, Director-General of Health (1995–2006), chief executive of the New Zealand Qualifications Authority (2006–2020), chair of Te Whatu Ora (2023–2024) (born 1950).
  - Leslie Snape, oral and maxillofacial surgeon (Christchurch Hospital, University of Otago, Christchurch), president of the Australian and New Zealand Association of Oral and Maxillofacial Surgeons (2011–2013), Fellow of the Royal College of Surgeons of England (since 2007) (born 1947).
- 4 January – Jules Radich, businessman and local politician, Dunedin City Councillor (2019–2022, since 2025), Mayor of Dunedin (2022–2025) (born 1954).
- 6 January – Justin Taylor, priest and historian (École Biblique) (born 1943).
- 7 January – Gus Gale, mathematics educator, principal of Hornby High School (1983–1994), B. H. Neumann award (1992) (born 1934).
- 8 January – Sir Tim Shadbolt, activist and politician, Mayor of Waitemata City (1983–1989), Mayor of Invercargill (1993–1995, 1998–2022) (born 1947).
- 11 January – Grahame Champness, national park ranger and Antarctic field assistant (born 1944).
- 12 January – Juno Hayes, local politician, Mayor of Clutha (1998–2010) (born 1943).
- 14 January – Aroha Awarau, journalist (TVNZ, Māori Television) and playwright (born 1976).
- 15 January – John Langdon, Hall of Fame harness-racing driver and trainer, Inter Dominion trotting (1975, 1992) and pacing champion (1975), Auckland Cup (1989), New Zealand Cup (1990) (born 1947).
- 16 January:
  - Grant Batty, rugby union player (Wellington, Bay of Plenty, national team) and coach (Yamaha Jubilo) (born 1951).
  - Joy Tonks, writer, historian and archivist (NZSO) (born 1939).
- 17 January – Sani Lakatani, Niuean politician, Premier of Niue (1999–2002) (born 1936).
- 19 January – Richard Wixon, cricketer (Central Districts, Otago) (born 1957).
- 20 January – Alan Musgrave, philosopher (University of Otago), Fellow of the Royal Society of New Zealand (since 2009) (born 1940).
- 23 January – Helen Leach, food anthropologist (University of Otago), Fellow of the Royal Society of New Zealand (since 2004) (born 1945).
- 24 January – Iain Sharp, poet, librarian and journalist (New Zealand Listener) (born 1953).
- 29 January – John Andreae, electrical and computer engineer (University of Canterbury) (born 1927).
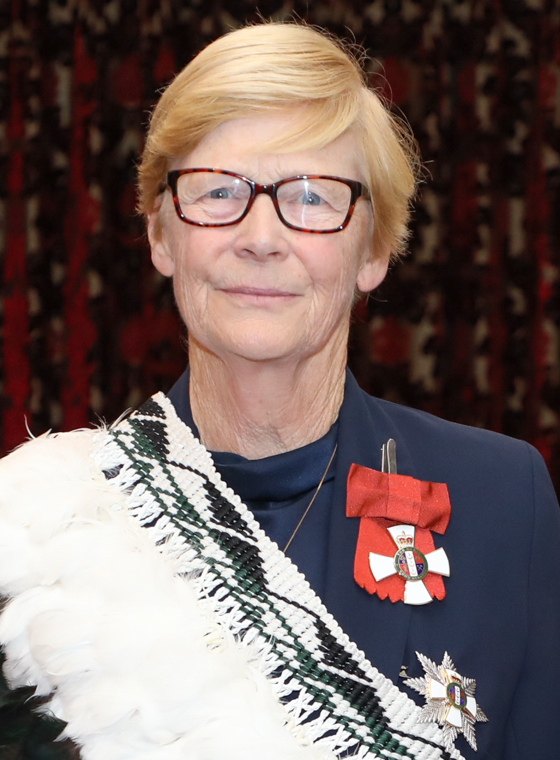
Dame Karen Poutasi

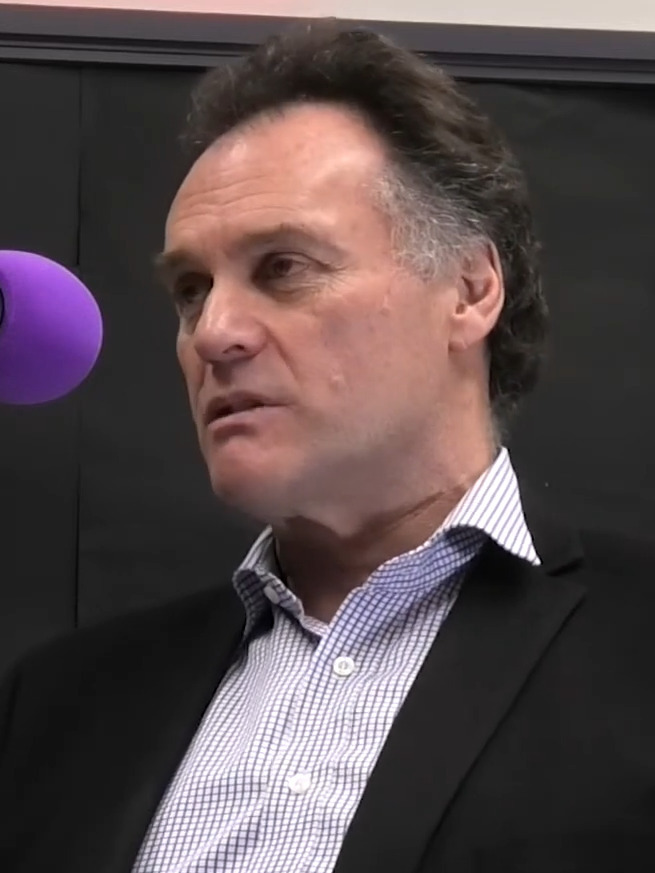
Jules Radich

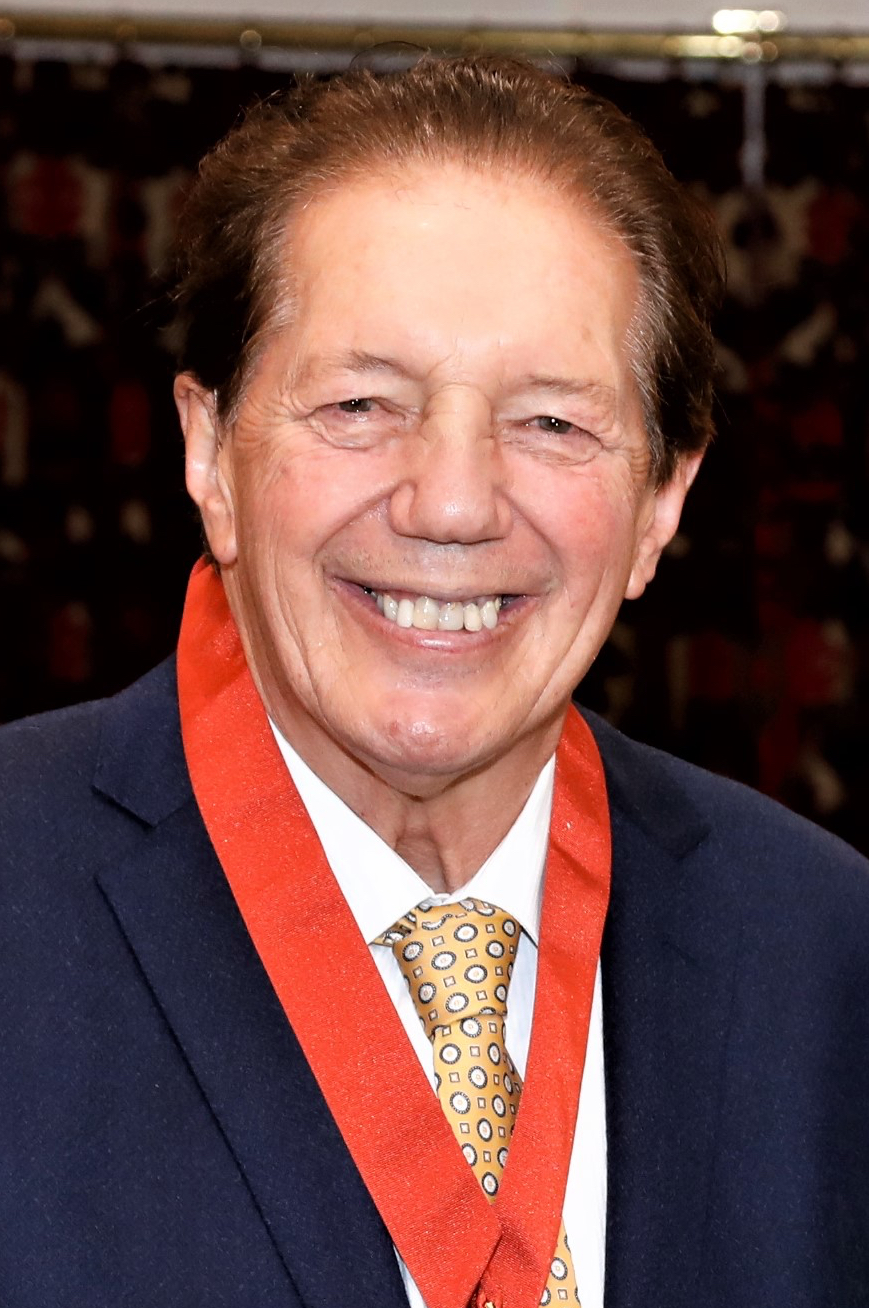
Sir Tim Shadbolt

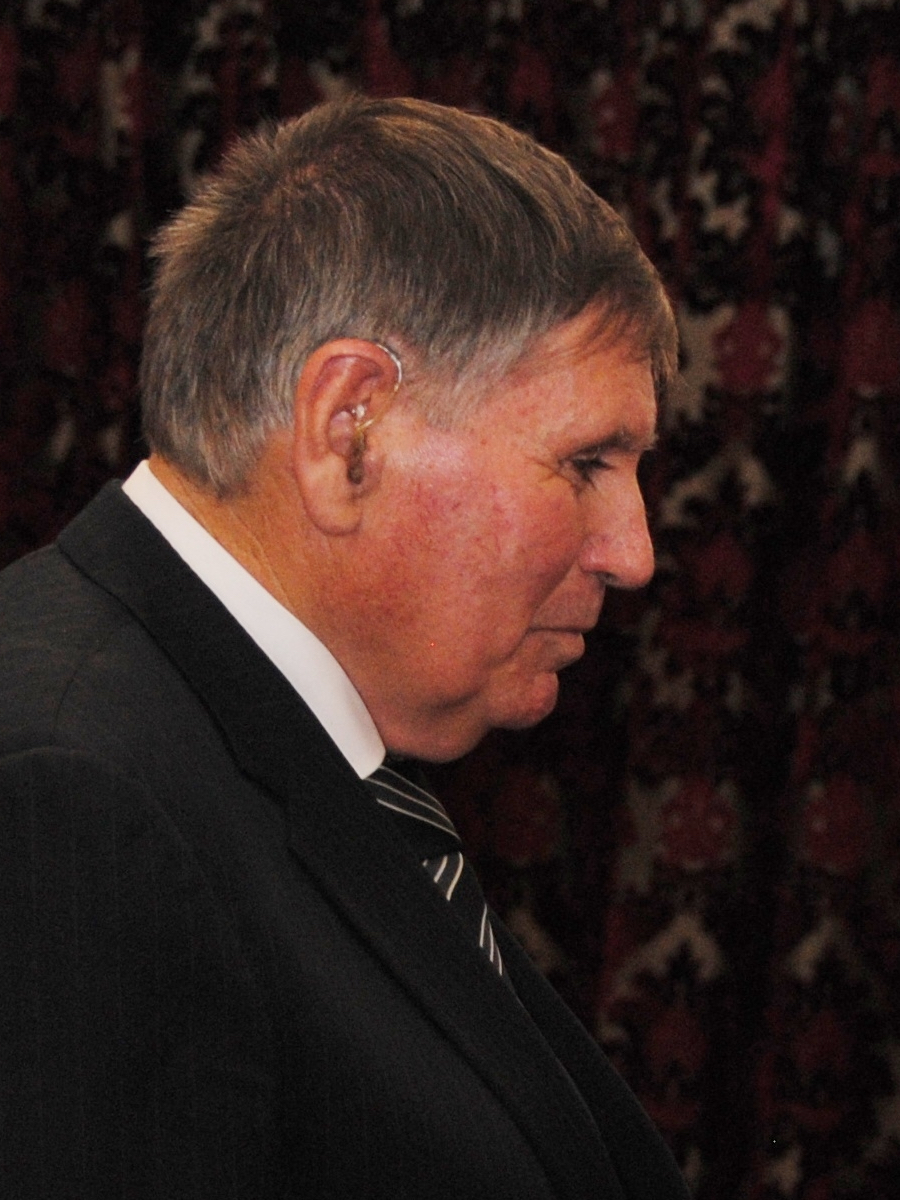
Juno Hayes

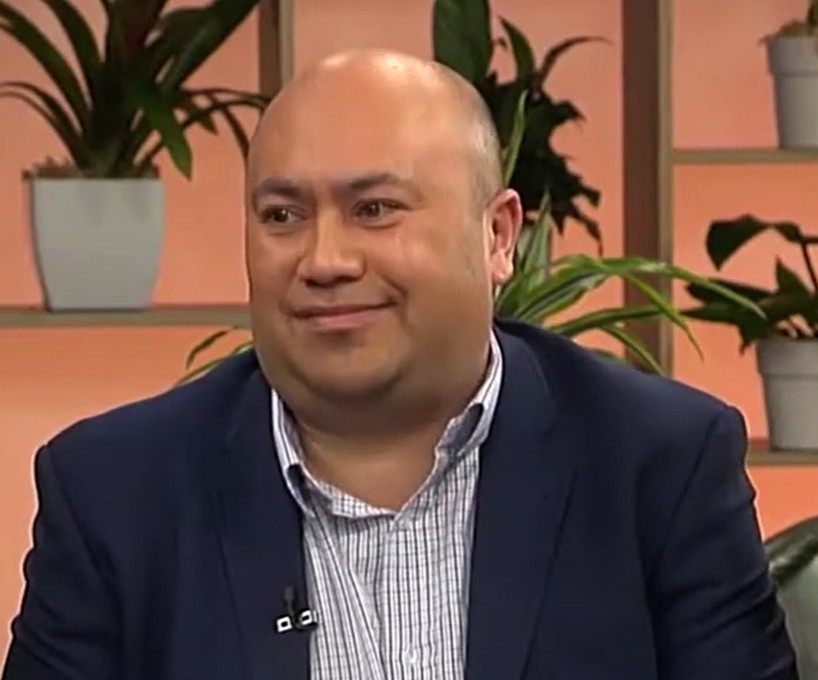
Aroha Awarau

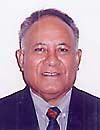
Sani Lakatani

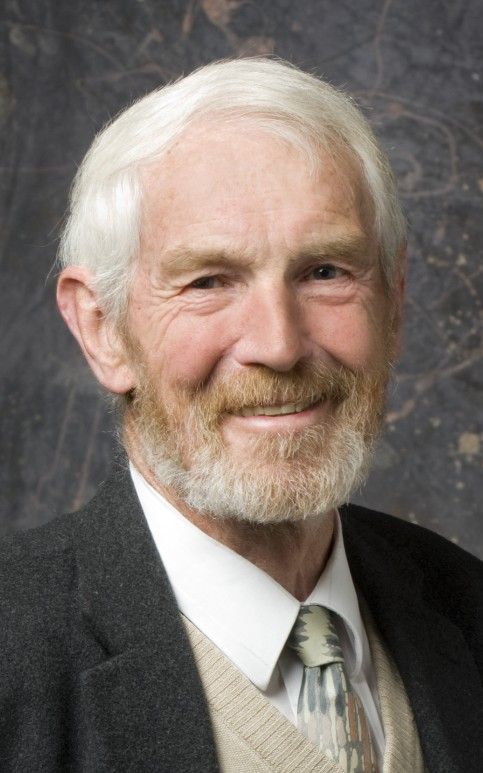
Alan Musgrave

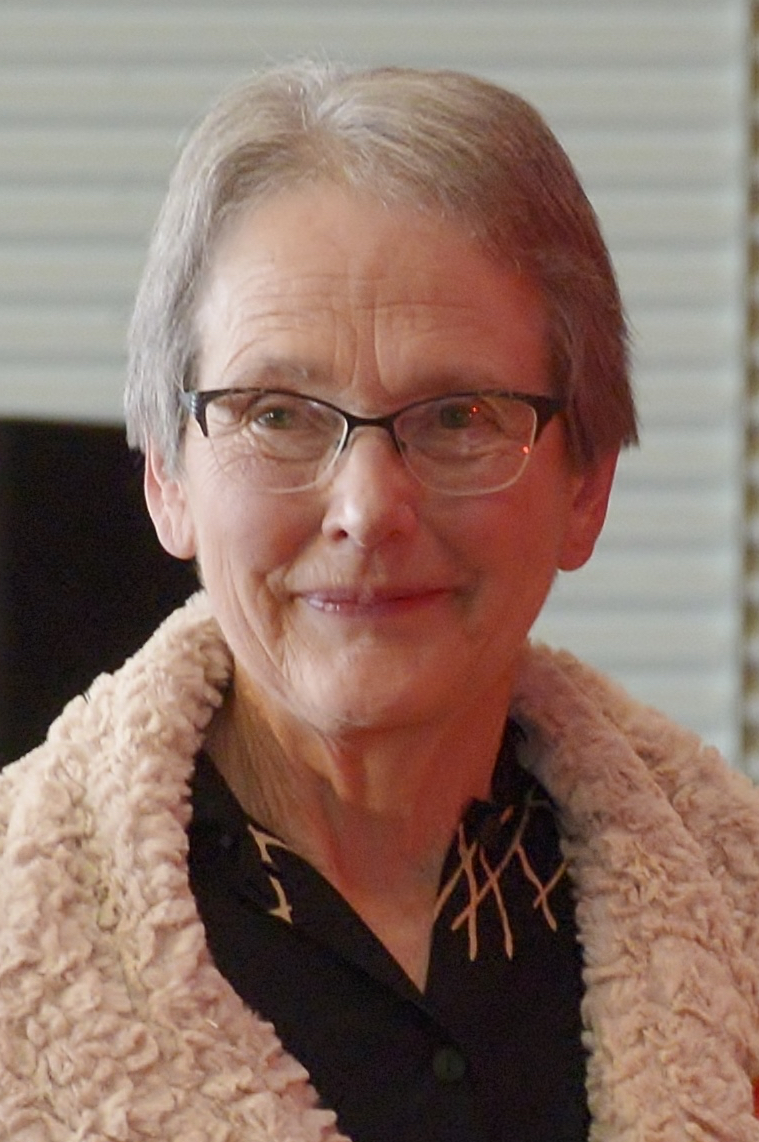
Helen Leach

Iain Sharp

=== February ===
- 2 February
  - Boris Moiseiwitsch, radio broadcaster (RNZ National) (born 1931).
  - Stu McCleery, rugby union player (Waikato) (born 1940).
  - John Terris, politician, Anglican priest and broadcaster, MP for Western Hutt (1978–1990), Mayor of Lower Hutt (1995–2004) (born 1939).
- 7 February – John Barsby, classical scholar (University of Otago), Fellow of the Royal Society of New Zealand (since 2009) (born 1935).
- 10 February
  - Sir Selwyn Cushing, accountant and company director, chair of Air New Zealand (1998–2001), Brierley Investments (1998–2001) and Skellerup (1987–1992, 2008–2017) (born 1936).
  - Anne Gambrill, lawyer and judge, master of the High Court (1987–2002) (born 1934).
- 11 February
  - Ray Bennett, local politician, Mayor of Timaru (1971, 1977–1982) (born 1932).
  - Pip Cheshire, architect, NZIA Gold Medal (2013), president of the New Zealand Institute of Architects (2014–2016) (born 1950).
  - Nathan McDonald, woodchopper, world championship bronze medallist (2022) (born c. 1990).
- 12 February – Norman Geary, business executive, chief executive of Air New Zealand (1982–1988), chair of New Zealand Tourism Board (1991–1996) (born 1938).
- 14 February – Ray Webster, aviation executive (Air New Zealand, easyJet) (born 1946).
- 20 February
  - David Savidan, middle-distance athlete, Oceania Athletics Championships bronze medallist (1990) (born 1967).
  - Michael Worth, pharmacist and local politician, Mayor of Tokoroa (1980–1983) (born 1934).
- 21 February – Roger Fowler, trade unionist (Engineers' Union), anti-Apartheid and Palestinian solidarity activist, founder of the Palestine Human Rights Campaign and Kia Ora Gaza (born 1948).
- 24 February – Freddie Graham, obstetrician and gynaecologist, pioneer of IVF in New Zealand (born 1943).
- 26 February – Robin Jefferson, cricketer (Otago, Wellington) and lawn bowls player, national pairs bowls champion (1992) (born 1941).
- 27 February – Owen Hunter, last surviving Spitfire pilot of No. 485 Squadron RNZAF (born 1925).
- 28 February – Ian Spellerberg, environmental scientist (Lincoln University), Science Communicator Medal (2008) (born 1941).
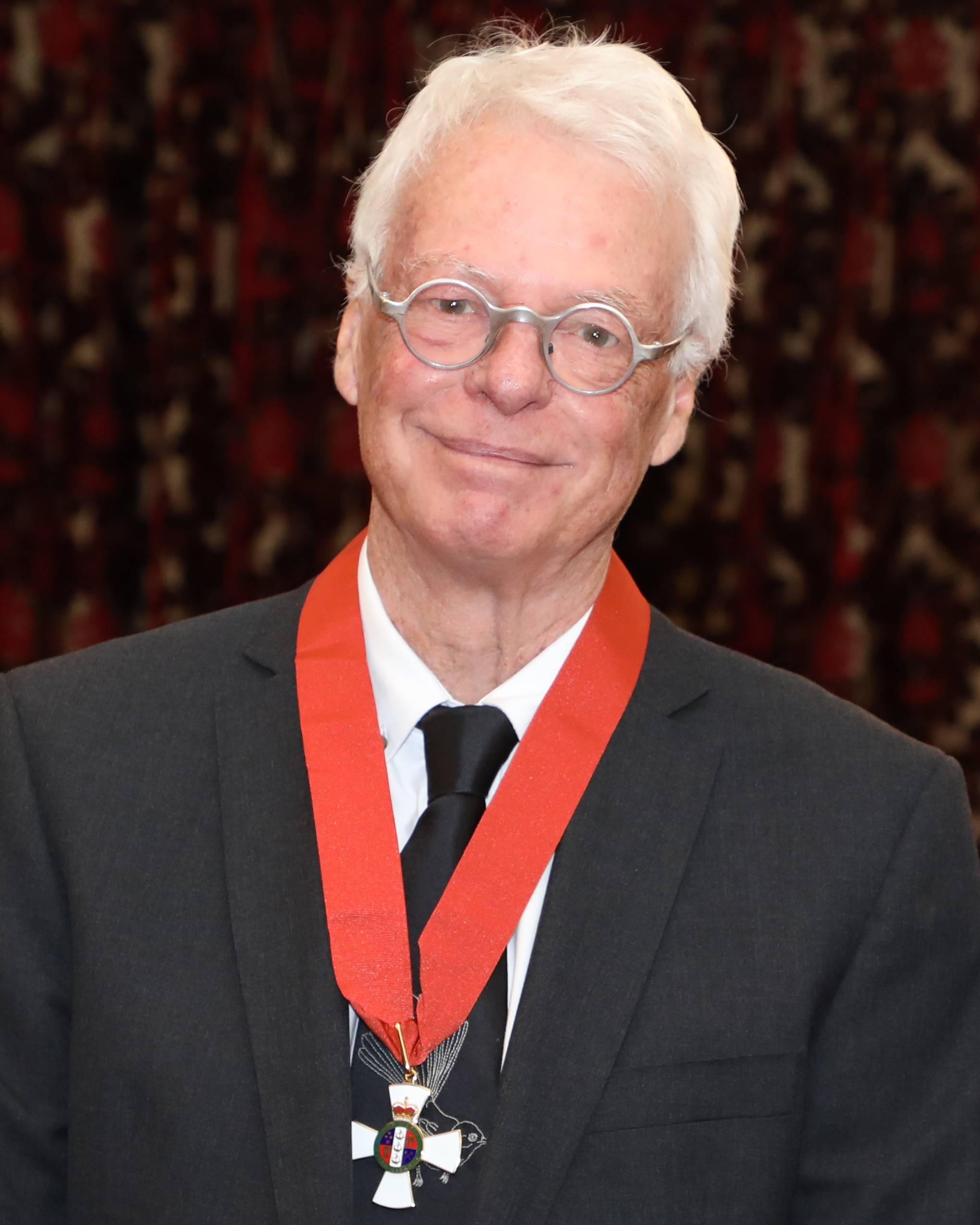
Pip Cheshire

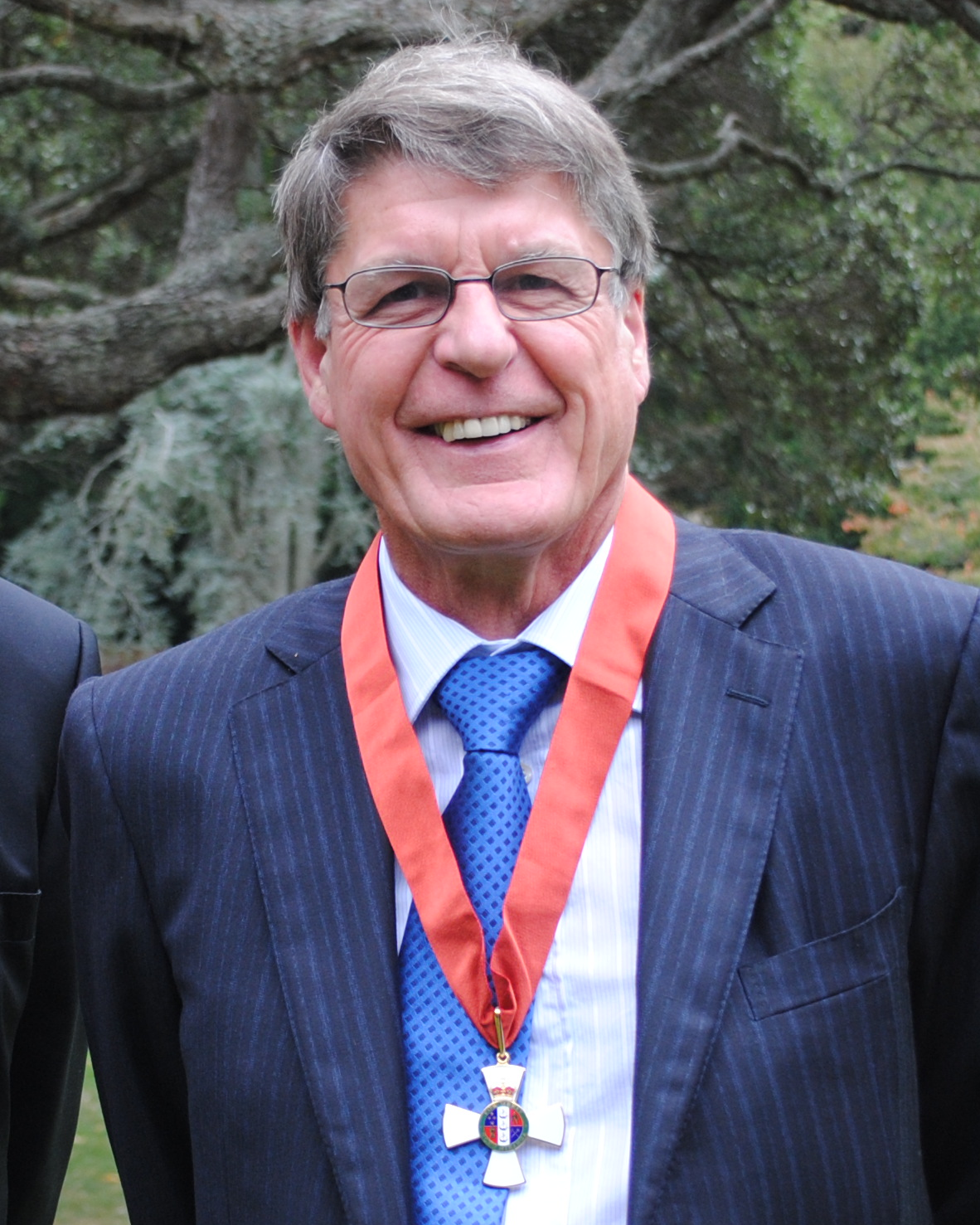
Freddie Graham

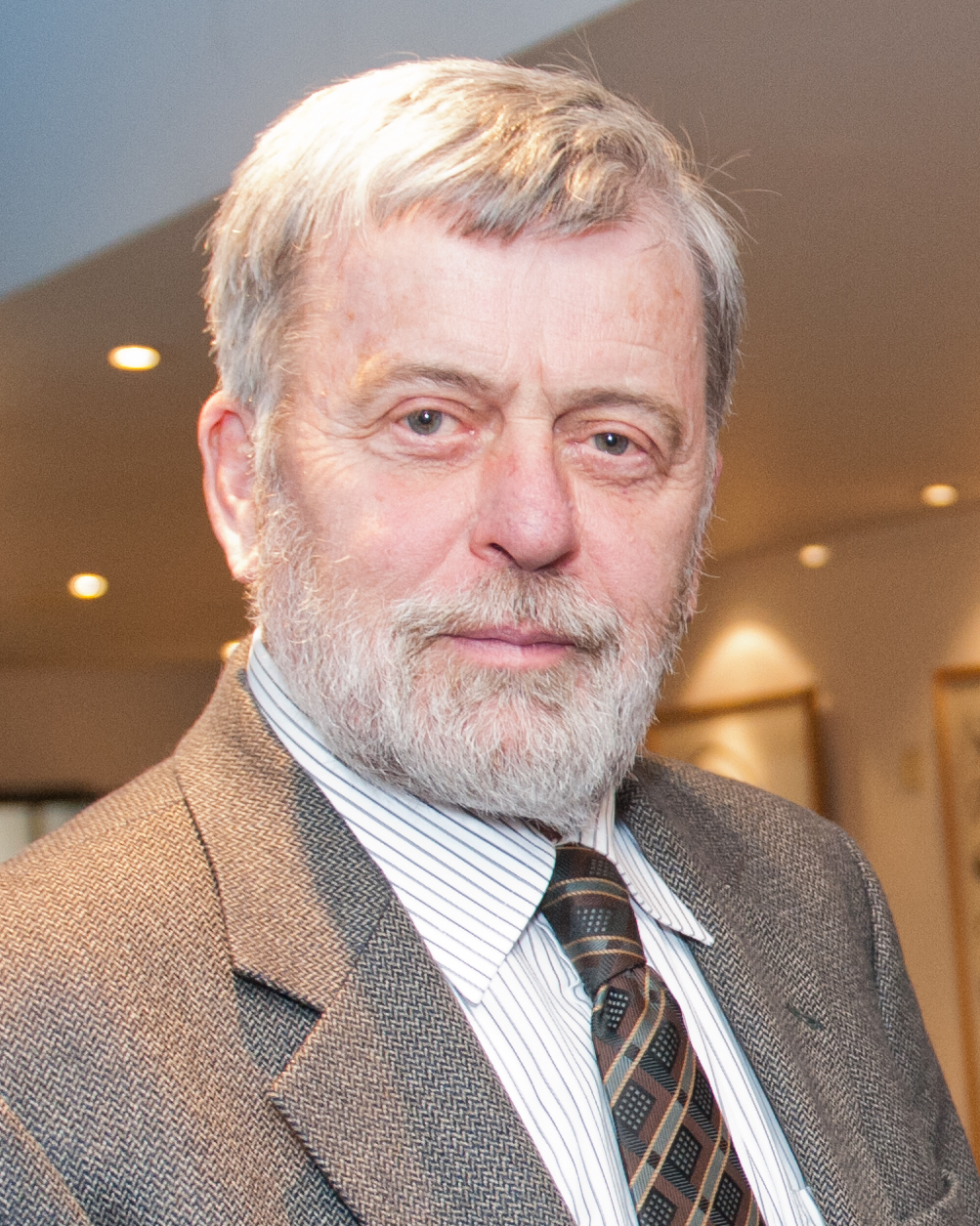
Ian Spellerberg

=== March ===
- 1 March:
  - Neville Peat, author, photographer, conservationist and politician, Otago Regional Councillor (1998–2007), Dunedin City Councillor (2013–2016), CLNZ Writers' Award (2016), Prime Minister's Awards for Literary Achievement (2024) (born 1947).
  - Ron Webb, rugby union player (Auckland) (born 1942).
- 2 March:
  - Murray Lints, educator, principal of Whangārei Boys' High School (1993–1999) (born 1939).
  - Jim Wilson, band manager (The Dance Exponents) and advertising company founder (born c. 1952). (death announced on this date)
- 4 March:
  - Neville Creighton, gay community activist (NZ AIDS Foundation) (born 1931).
  - Grant Mitchinson, rugby union player (Wanganui, Hawke's Bay) (born 1951).
  - Jimmy Russell, Māori leader (Ngāi Tahu) (born 1939).
  - Philip Trusttum, figurative expressionist artist (The Group) (born 1940).
- 6 March – Nathan Healey, British Commonwealth Games athlete (1974) and cross country runner, World Cross Country Championships bronze medallist (1973) (born 1949).
- 7 March – Dilworth Karaka, Hall of Fame musician (Herbs) and songwriter ("Sensitive to a Smile") (born 1950).
- 11 March:
  - John Hunn, businessman, sports administrator and philanthropist (born 1937).
  - Nev MacEwan, rugby union player (Wellington, national team) (born 1934).
- 12 March – Trevor McMahon, cricketer (Wellington, national team) (born 1929).
- 13 March:
  - Ann Gluckman, educator and community leader, principal of Nga Tapuwae College (1975–1989) (born 1927).
  - Don Willoughby, teacher, athlete, and athletics coach and administrator, president of Athletics New Zealand (2003–2004) (born 1939).
- 17 March – John Coley, artist and art critic, director of the Robert McDougall Art Gallery (1981–1995) (born 1935).
- 21 March – Wayne Wright, businessman and philanthropist (born 1946).
- 22 March – Catherine Saunders, broadcasting personality (Beauty and the Beast), public relations executive and radio producer (born 1942).
- 27 March – Gerald McGhie, diplomat, high commissioner to Papua New Guinea (1985–1988), ambassador to the Soviet Union (1990–1991), Russia (1992–1993) and South Korea (1996–1999) (born 1939).
- 29 March
  - Morrie Chandler, rally driver and motorsports administrator, Motorsport Association of New Zealand president (1977–1998), FIA vice president (2006–2017), Halberg Lifetime Achievement Award (2017) (born 1940).
  - John Keesing – last surviving RNZAF fighter pilot from World War II (born 1923).
- 30 March – Sir Barry Curtis, local politician, Manukau City Councillor (1968–1983), Auckland Regional Authority member (1971–1983), Mayor of Manukau City (1983–2007), director of the 1990 Commonwealth Games (born 1939).
- 31 March – Robin Jackson, swimming coach and administrator, president of the New Zealand Swimming Federation (1996–1999) (born 1939).
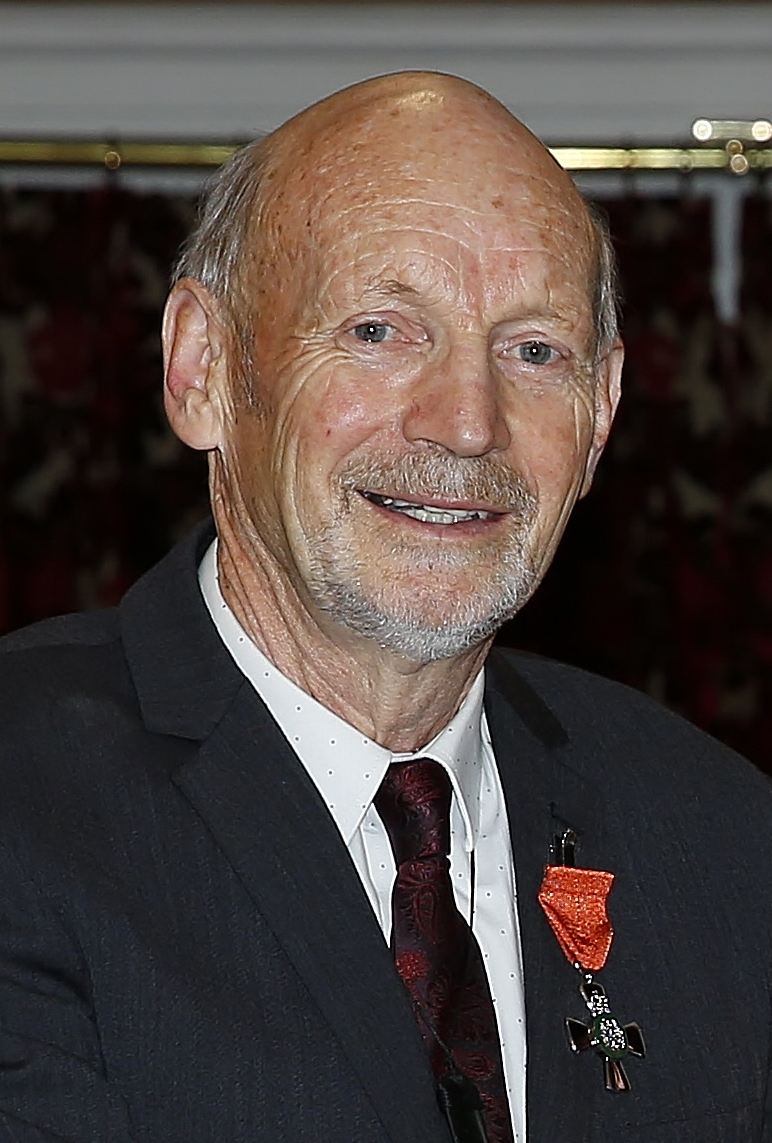
Neville Peat

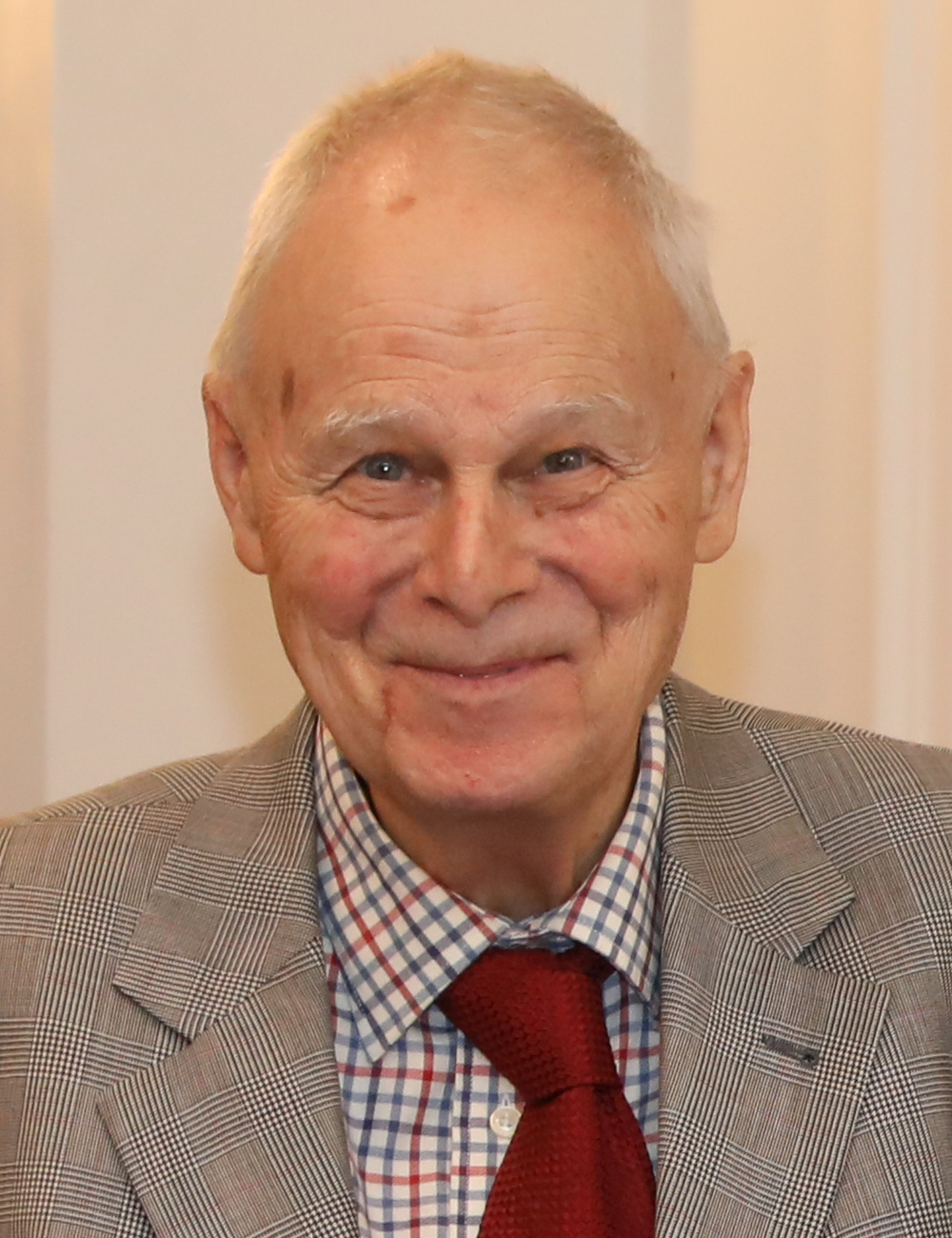
Philip Trusttum

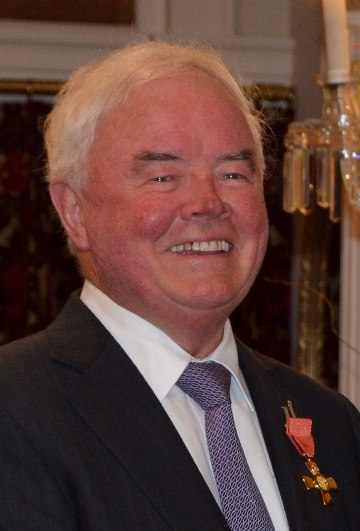
John Hunn

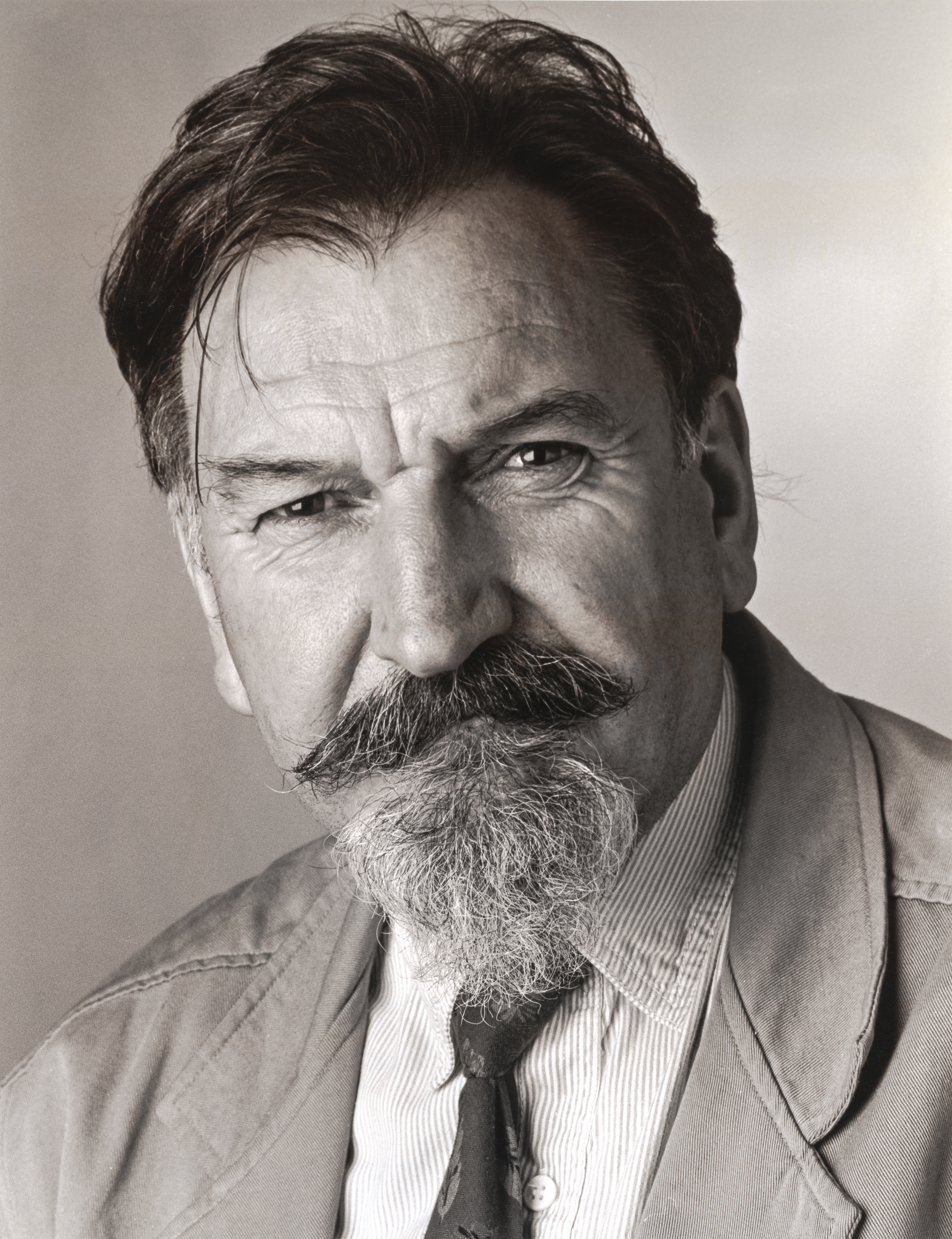
John Coley

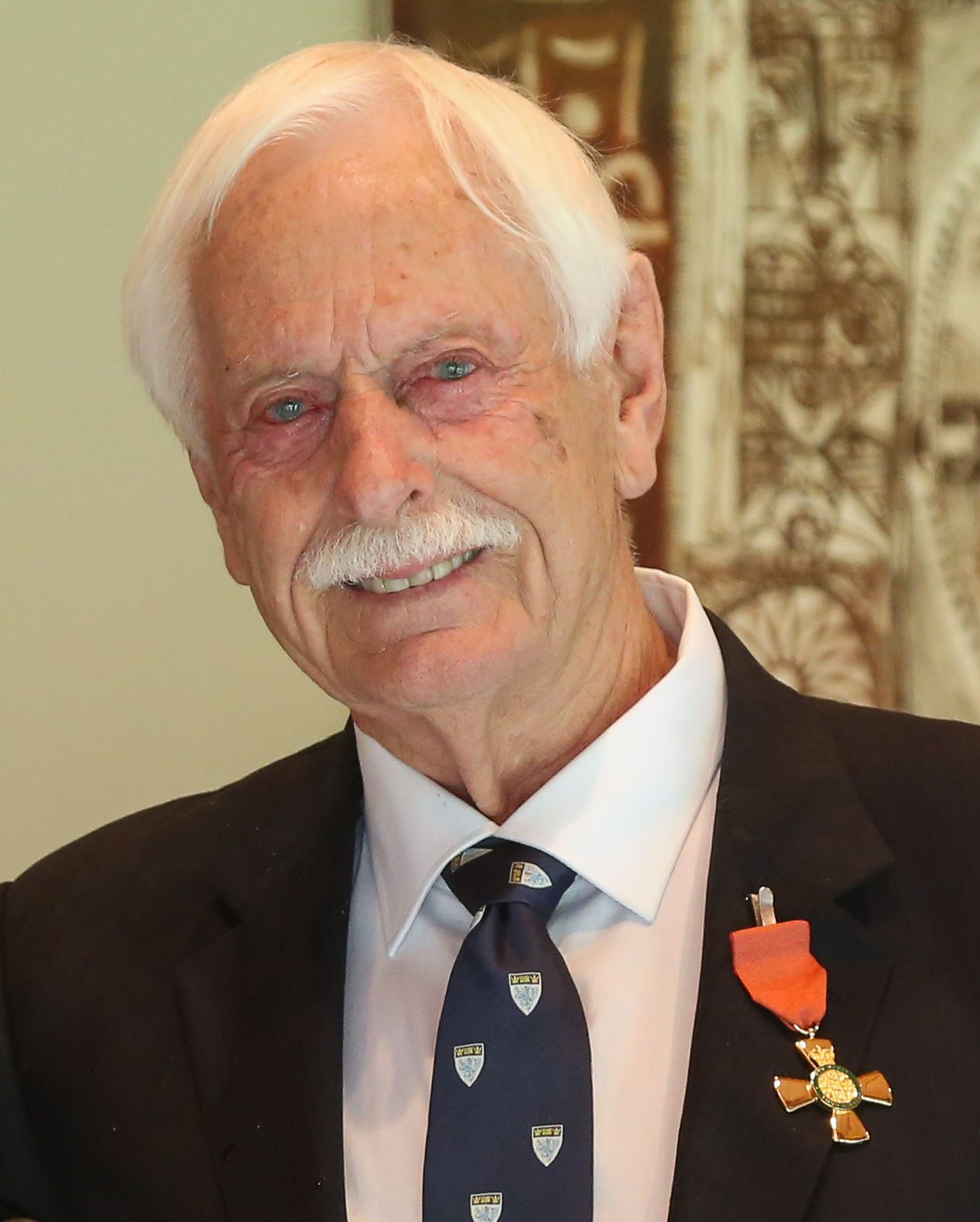
Wayne Wright

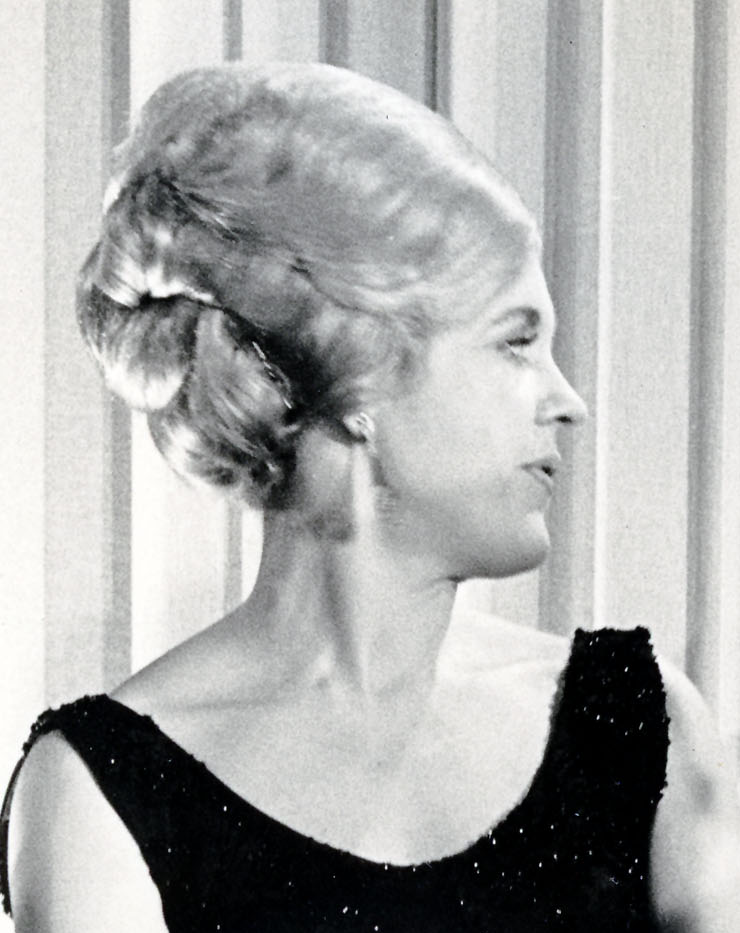
Catherine Saunders

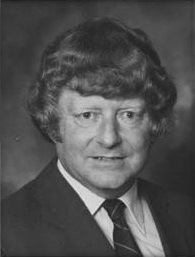
Sir Barry Curtis

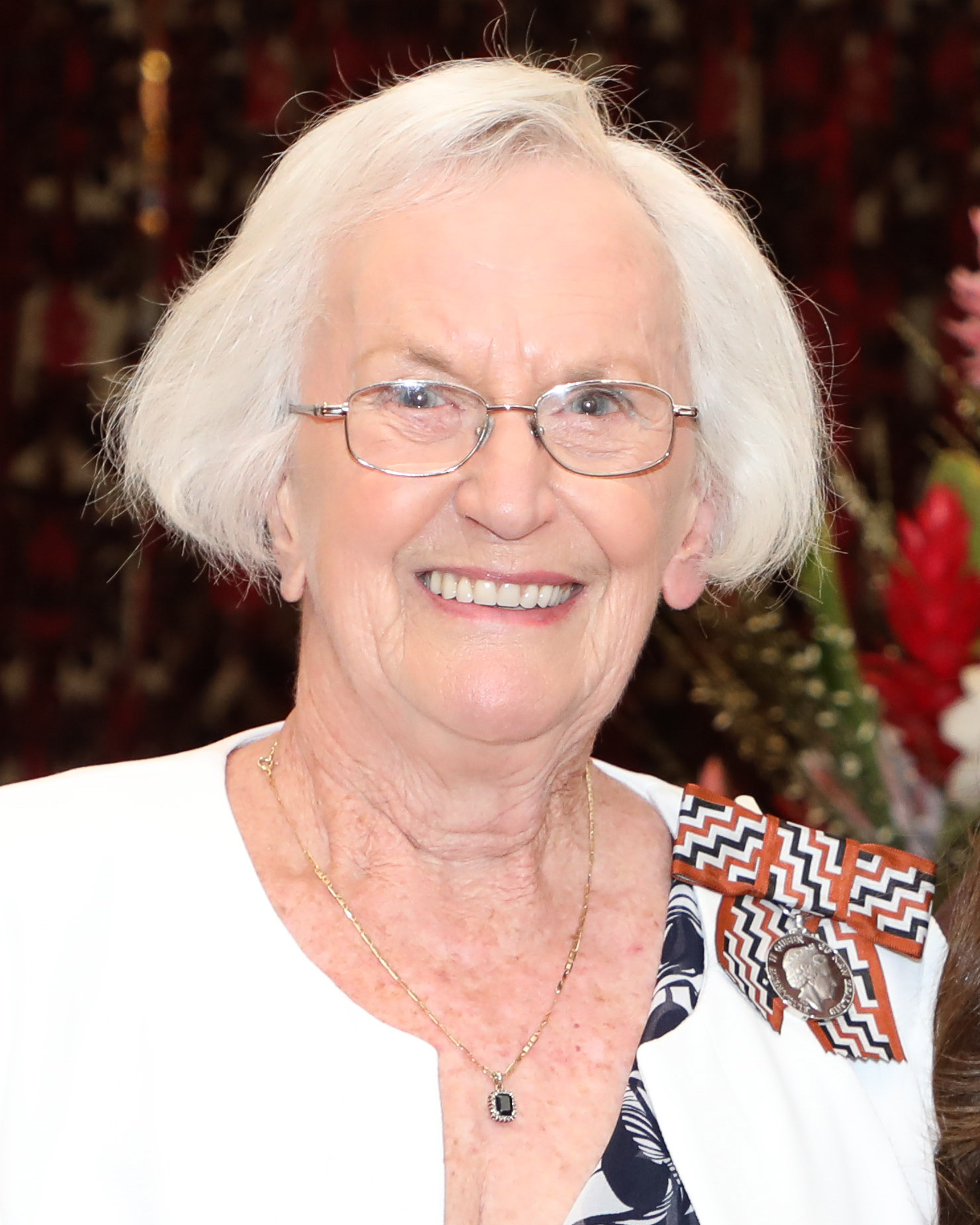
Robin Jackson

=== April ===
- 1 April:
  - Jack Harliwich, cricketer (Canterbury) and cricket coach (Canterbury) (born 1930).
  - Lee Mathias, nurse, healthcare business founder and health administrator, chair of Counties Manukau DHB (2013–2016) (born 1951).
- 2 April – Ian Rutherford, cricketer (Otago, Central Districts) (born 1957).
- 3 April – John Baxter, artist (born 1952).
- 4 April – Cathie Gordon, art historian (Courtauld Institute, Birkbeck College) (born 1945).
- 5 April – Judith Trotter, diplomat, ambassador to France (1988–1992) and Italy (1994–1998) (born 1935).
- 8 April – Brian Brooks, legal academic (Victoria University of Wellington) (born 1937).
- 9 April:
  - Ward Robinson, crystallographer (University of Canterbury), Fellow of the Royal Society of New Zealand (since 1987) (born 1937).
  - Graeme Stevens, paleontologist (New Zealand Geological Survey) and science communicator, Fellow of the Royal Society of New Zealand (since 1976) (born 1932).
- 10 April:
  - Matt Arnold, graphic designer (born 1976).
  - Sir Alan Frampton, agricultural economist (Massey University), chair of the Tatua Dairy Company (1990–2003) (born 1929).
  - Sharon Hawke, film and television camera operator, television director, and Māori leader (Ngāti Whātua Ōrākei) (born 1962).
- 11 April:
  - Cleighten Cornelius, cricketer (Canterbury) and winemaker (born 1976).
  - Peter Lynn, engineer and kite maker (born 1946).
- 12 April – Alan Livingston, politician, Mayor of Waipā (2001–2013) (born 1952).
- 15 April – Ned, snail with left-spriralling shell.
- 16 April – Mark Carrington, cricketer (Northern Districts) (born 1961).
- 19 April – Marshall Seifert, basketball player, coach (junior national team) and commentator (4ZB, TVNZ), television personality, and art gallery owner, Mobil Radio Award for best sports commentator (1993) (born 1939).
- 20 April
  - Adrienne Staples, politician, Mayor of South Wairarapa (2004–2016), deputy chair of Greater Wellington Regional Council (since 2019) (born 1956).
  - William Vivanco-Mackie, animal reproductive scientist (born 1947).
- 21 April
  - Bob Brennan, missionary priest (Missionary Society of St. Columban) and social activist (born 1941).
  - Paul Standidge, cricketer (Wellington) (born 1934).
- 24 April – Rocky Don Hall, country music entertainer (born 1933).
- 28 April
  - Keith Morrison, natural resources engineer (University of the South Pacific, Lincoln University) (born 1959).
  - Richard Neutze, biophysicist (University of Gothenburg) (born 1969).
- 29 April
  - David Bell, art educator (University of Otago) (born 1950).
  - Frances Granger, netball player (national team) and coach (Fijian national team), world championship bronze medallist (1975) (born 1945).
  - Brian Sampson, rugby union player (Mid Canterbury) and coach (Mid Canterbury), and cricketer (Canterbury) (born 1945).
  - Carla van Zon, artistic director (New Zealand International Festival of the Arts, Auckland Arts Festival) (born 1952).
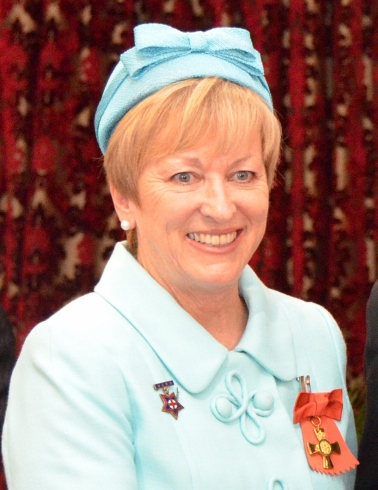
Lee Mathias

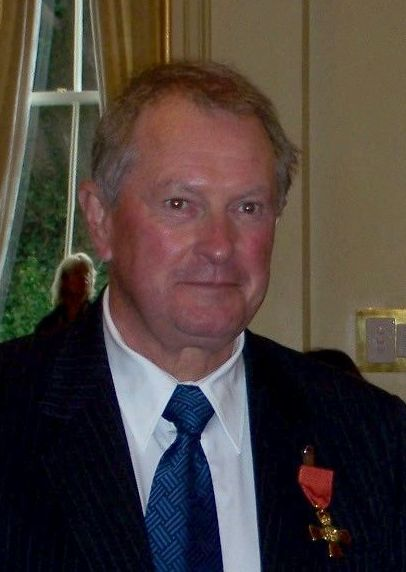
Brian Brooks

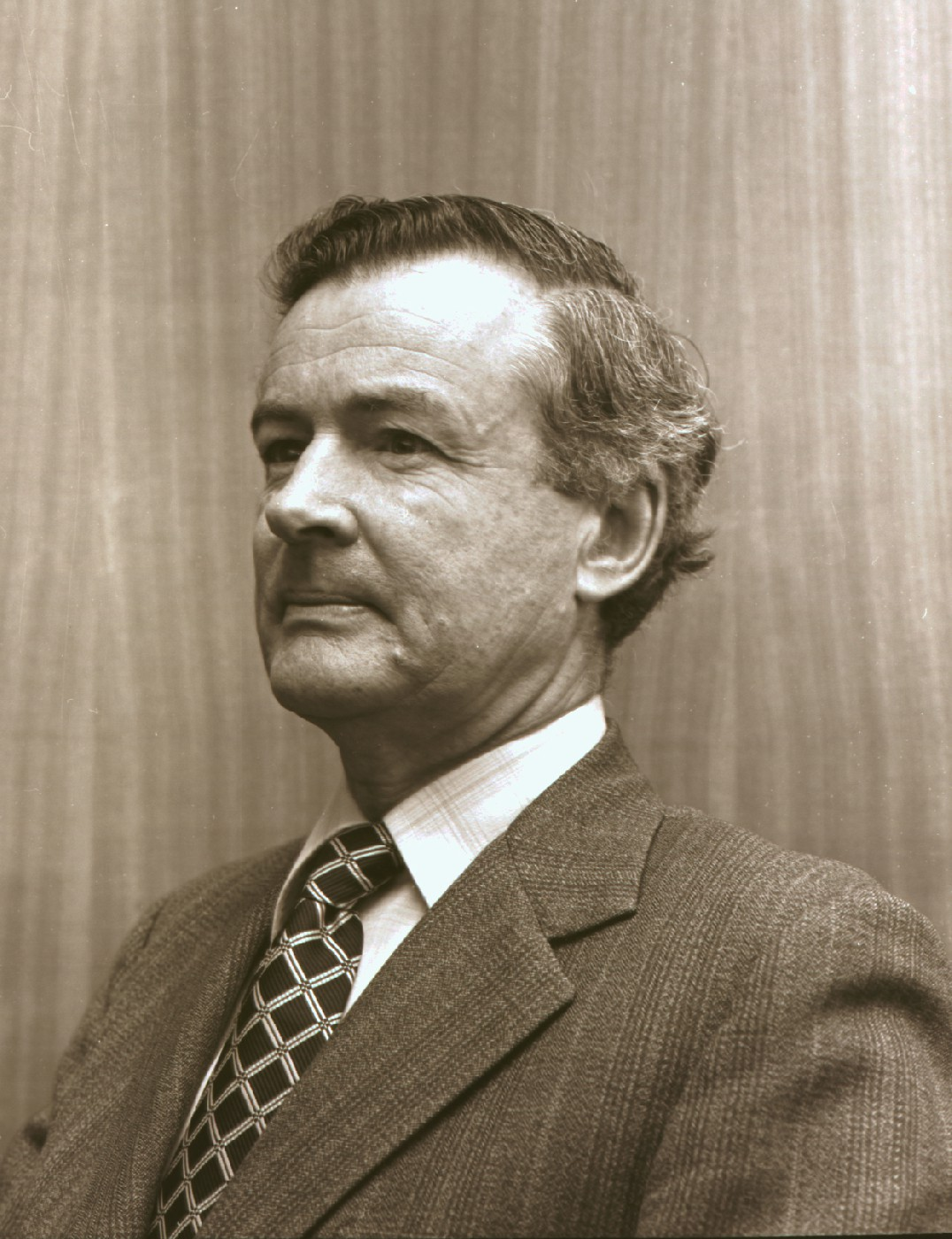
Sir Alan Frampton

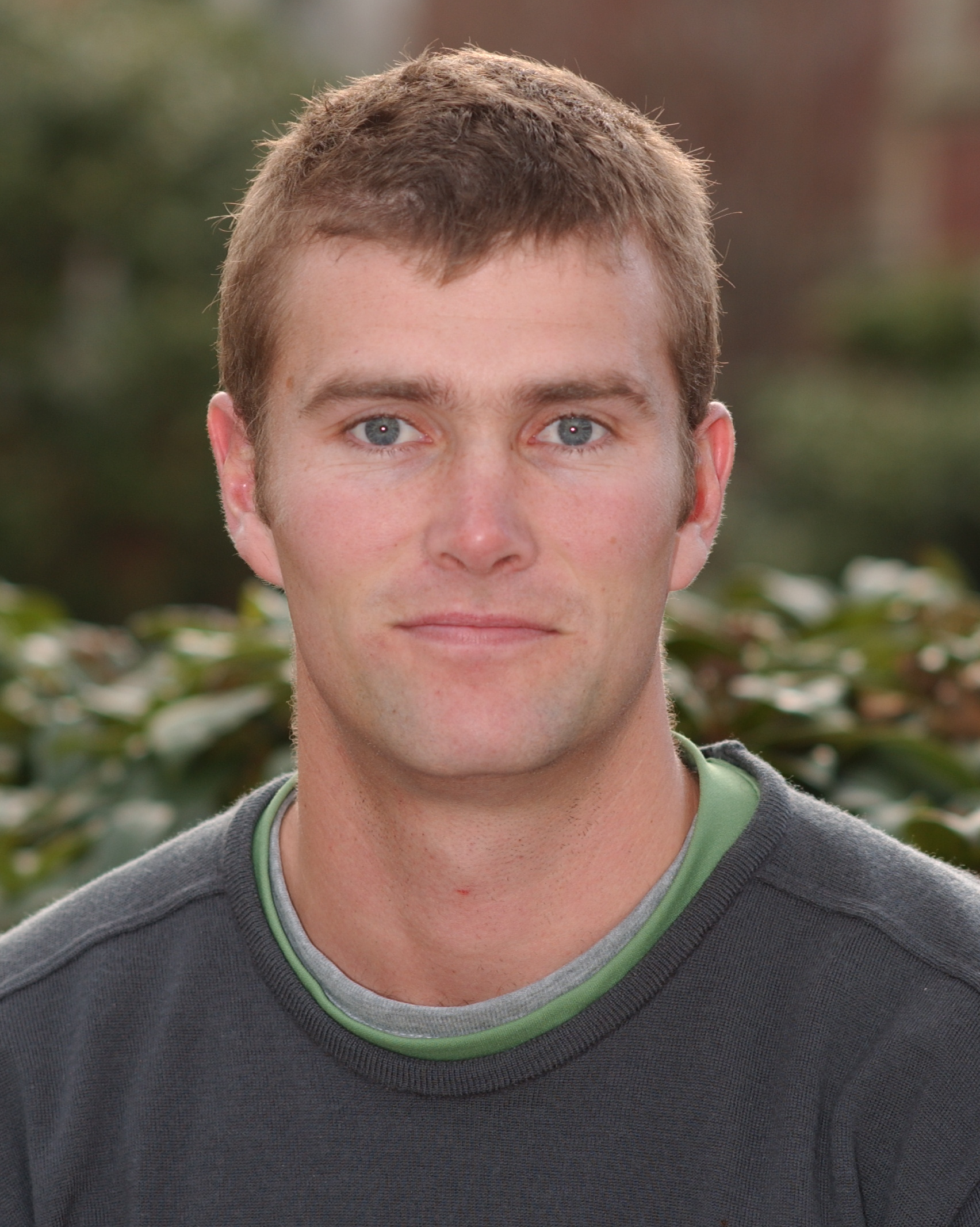
Cleighten Cornelius

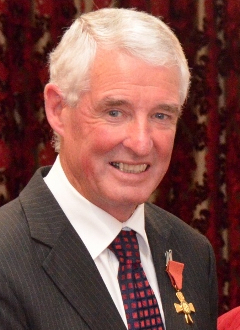
Alan Livingston

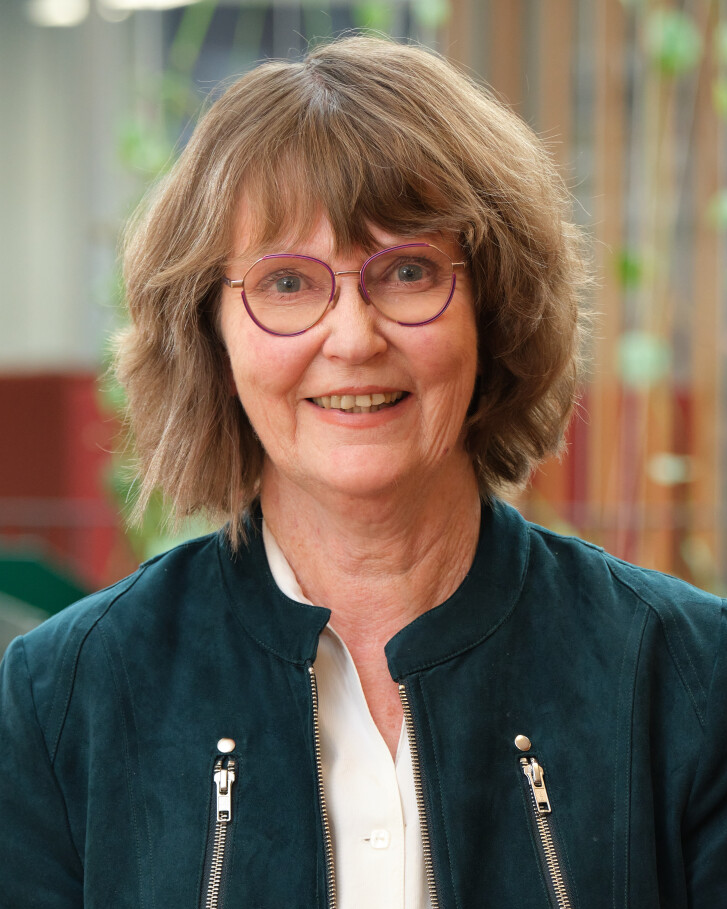
Adrienne Staples

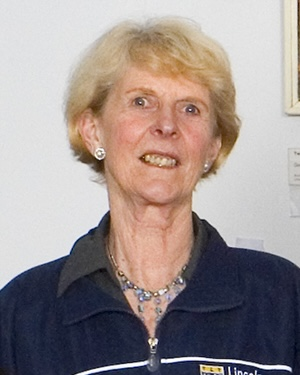
Frances Granger

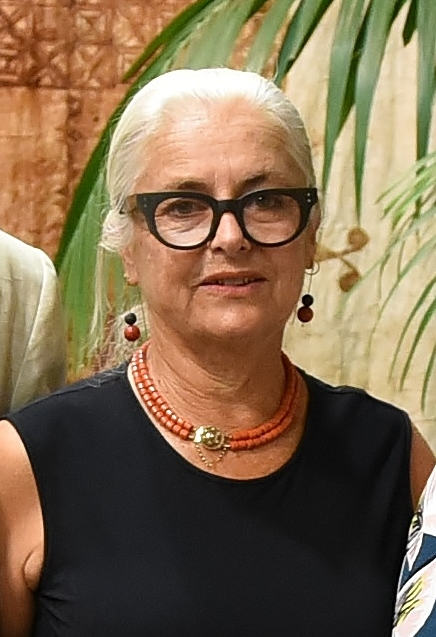
Carla van Zon

=== May ===
- 2 May – Barrie Wills, environmental scientist and local politician, Central Otago District Councillor (2013–2019) (born 1952).
- 3 May – Geoff Stedman, physicist (University of Canterbury), Hector Medal (1994), Fellow of the Royal Society of New Zealand (since 1989) (born 1943).
- 4 May – Marie Taylor, women's leader, YWCA national president (1989–1993) (born 1932).
- 5 May – Bill Smalley, cricketer (Auckland) (born 1942).
- 8 May
  - Ken Kennedy, Māori leader (Te Arawa) (born c. 1951).
  - Blair Mirfin, rugby union player (Nelson Bays, Marlborough, West Coast) (born c. 1976).
- 9 May
  - Mike Boyes, outdoor recreation and mountain safety advocate, physical education academic (University of Otago) (born 1951).
  - Mark Smythe, musician (California State University, Northridge; Los Angeles College of Music) and composer (Daddy's Little Girl, Unfallen, The Reef: Stalked) (born 1972).
- 10 May – Alistair Gunn, paediatrician (University of Auckland), Shorland Medal (2017), Fellow of the Royal Society of New Zealand (since 2009) (born 1958).
- 13 May – Sir Kenneth Keith, jurist and legal scholar (Victoria University of Wellington), Supreme Court justice (2004–2005), King's Counsel (since 1994), Privy Councillor (since 1998), Member of the Order of New Zealand (since 2007) (born 1937).
- 17 May – Bob Andrews, speedway rider (Wimbledon Dons, Cradley Heathens, national team) (born 1935).
- 19 May – Ian Hall, mycologist (Crop & Food Research), pioneer of truffle cultivation in New Zealand (born 1946).
- 21 May
  - Malcolm Campbell, butcher and local politician, Mayor of Kawerau (2001–2022), Bay of Plenty Regional Councillor (since 2022) (born 1952).
  - Sir Tamati Reedy, rugby union player (East Coast, Thames Valley, New Zealand Maori), linguist and anthropologist (University of Waikato), public servant, and Māori leader (Ngāti Porou), member of the Waitangi Tribunal (2010–2016) (born 1936).
- 23 May
  - Bob Autridge, racehorse trainer (born 1940).
  - Dame Jools Topp, Hall of Fame musician and comedian (Topp Twins) (born 1958).
- 24 May – Grant Dickson, operatic bass (born 1933).
- 26 May – Jan Pentecost, advocate for seniors, president of Grey Power (2020–2024) (born 1944).
- 27 May – Lew Evans, economist (Victoria University of Wellington) (born 1943).
- 29 May
  - Sir Hirini Moko Mead, Māori leader (Ngāti Awa), anthropologist and historian (McMaster University, Victoria University of Wellington, Te Whare Wānanga o Awanuiārangi), co-curator of Te Maori (1984) (born 1927).
  - Ian Speden, geologist (DSIR, Institute of Geological and Nuclear Sciences), Marsden Medal (2001), Fellow of the Royal Society of New Zealand (since 1980) (born 1932).
- 30 May – Ronald LaPread, Hall of Fame musician (Commodores) (born 1949).
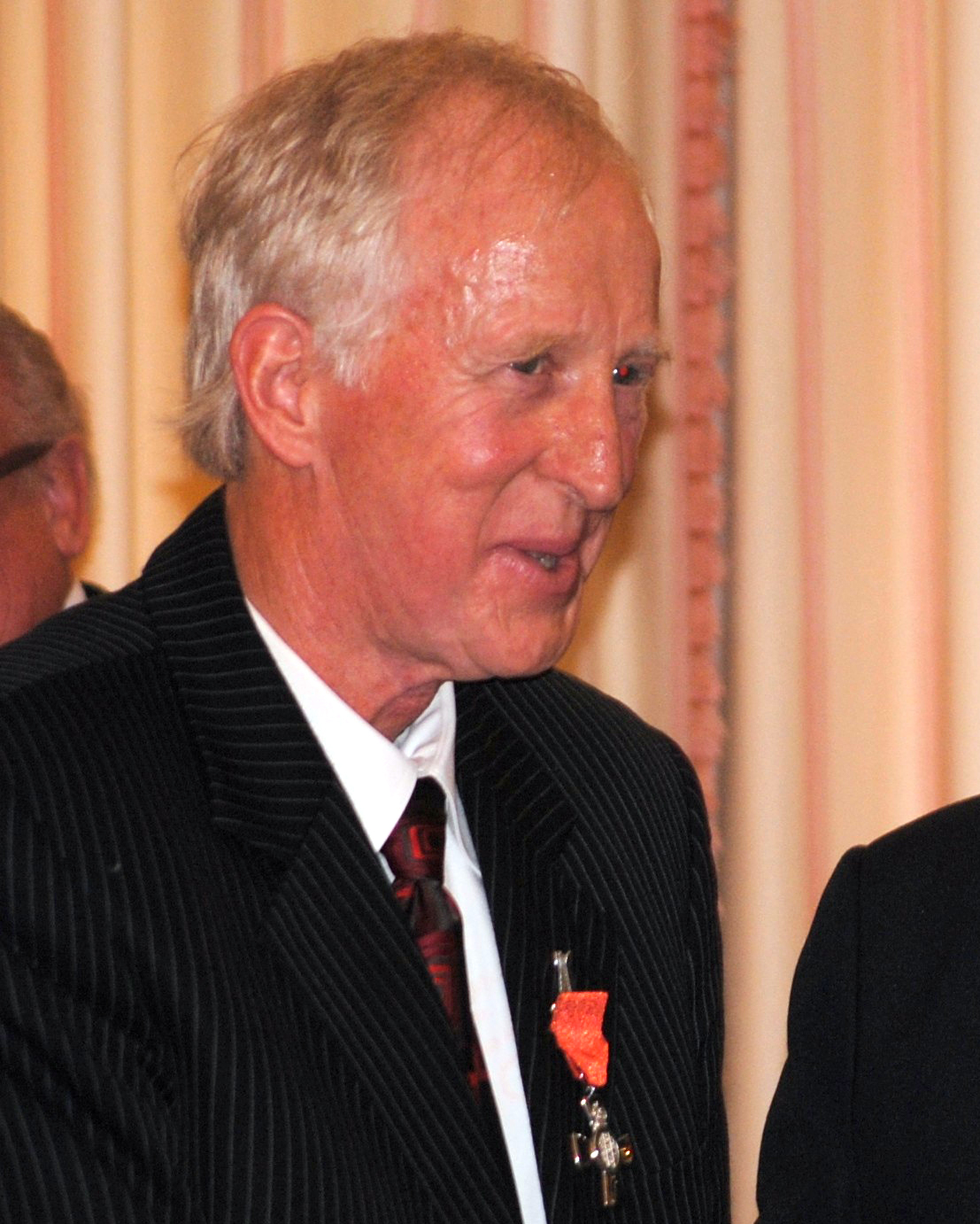
Mike Boyes

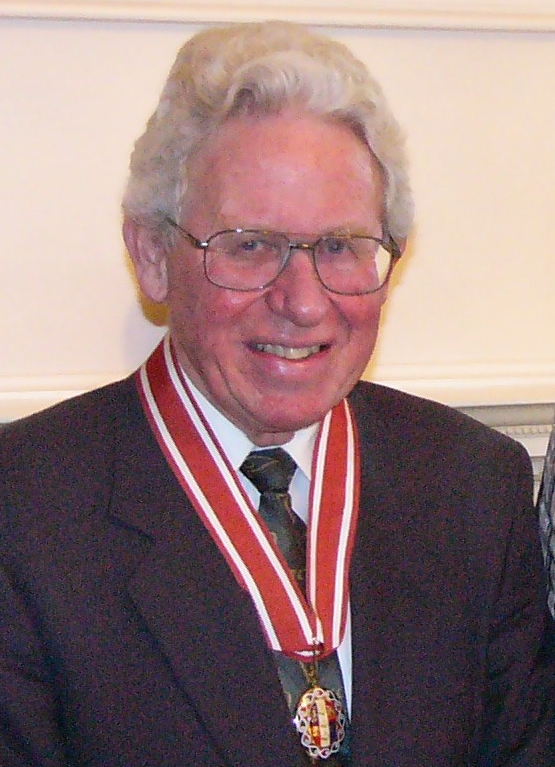
Sir Kenneth Keith

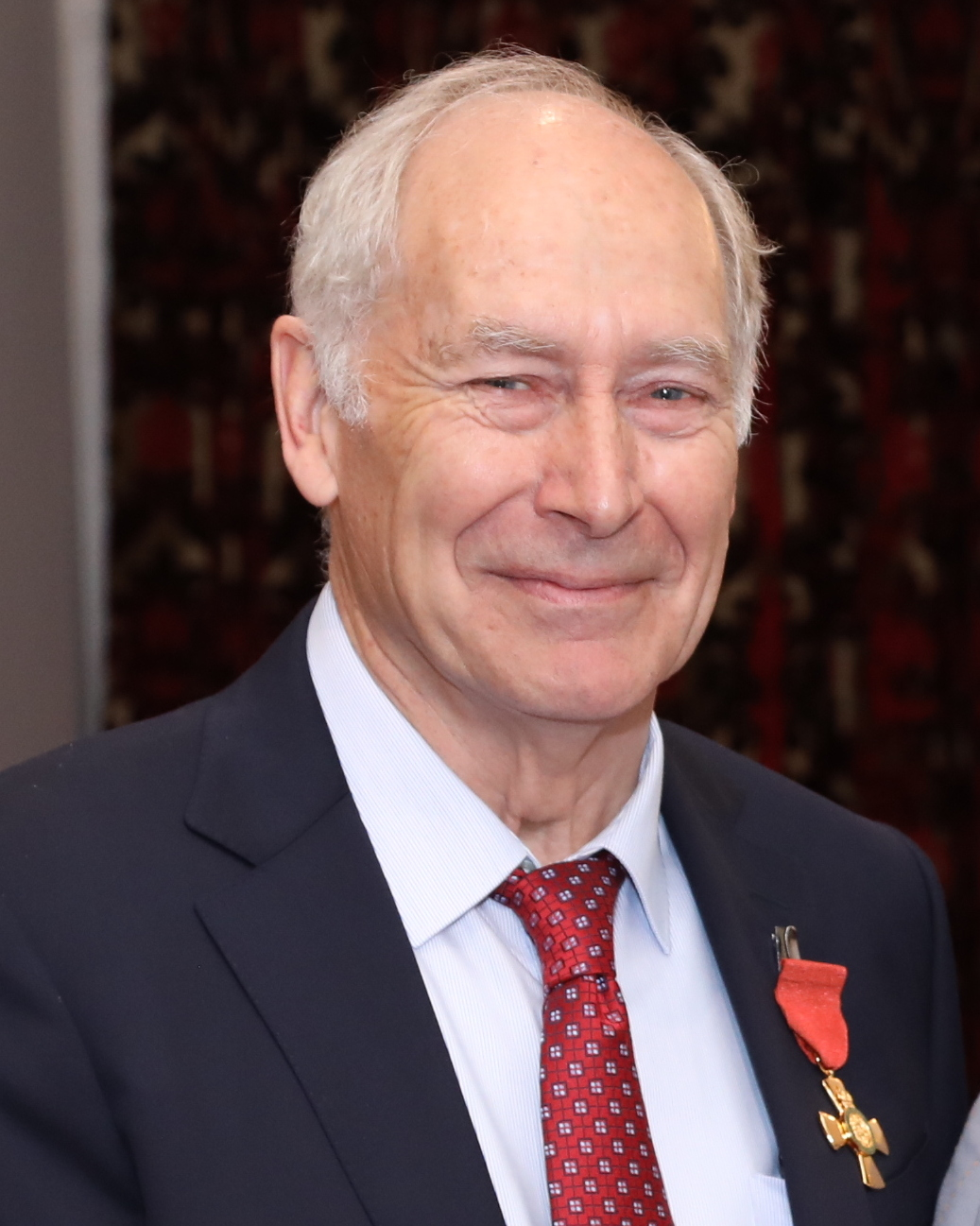
Ian Hall

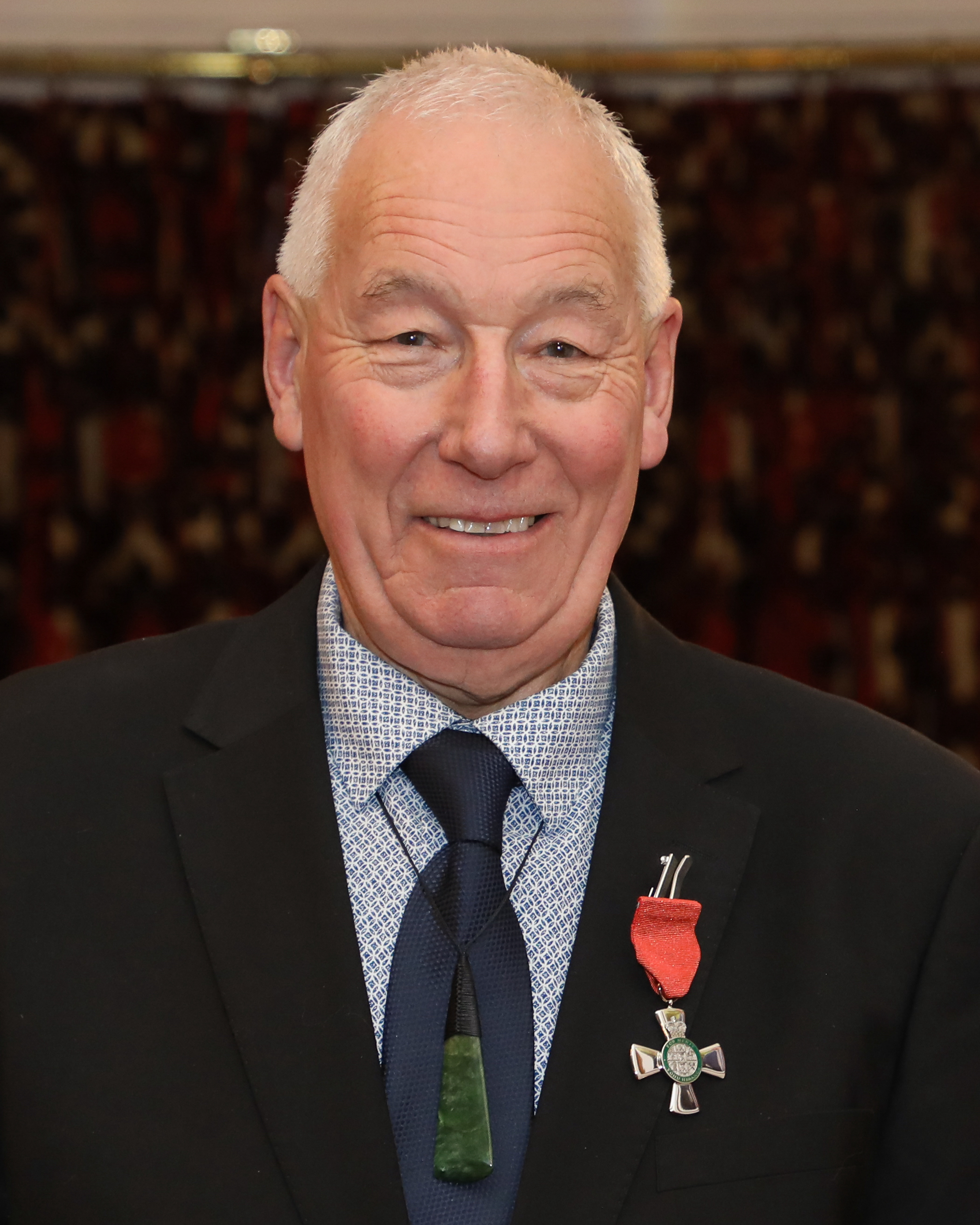
Malcolm Campbell

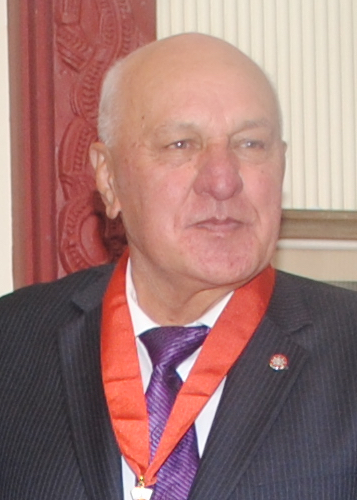
Sir Tamati Reedy

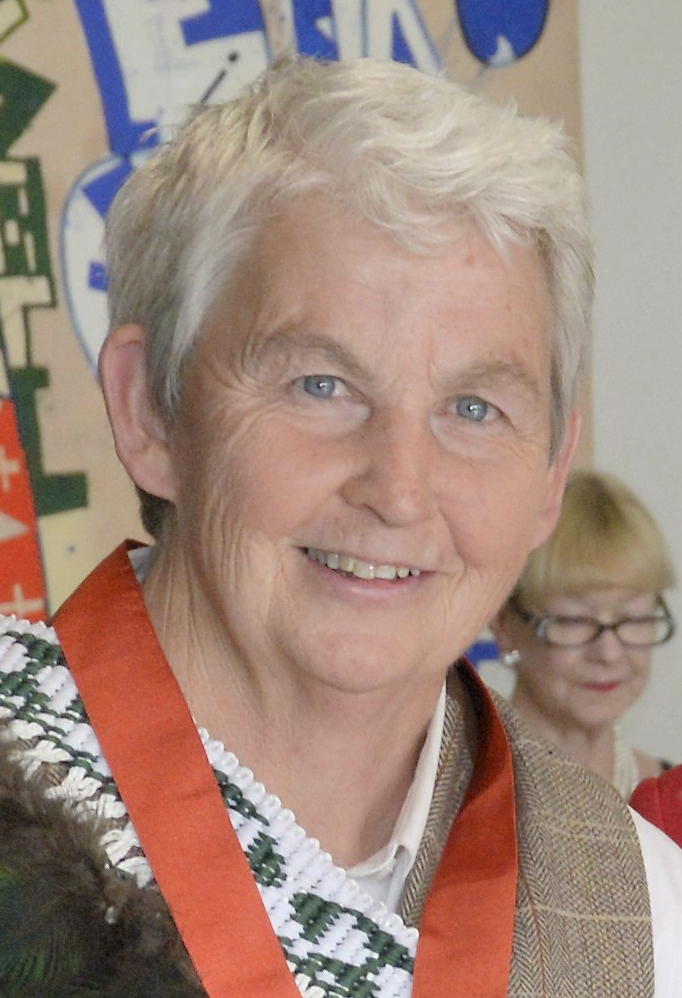
Dame Jools Topp

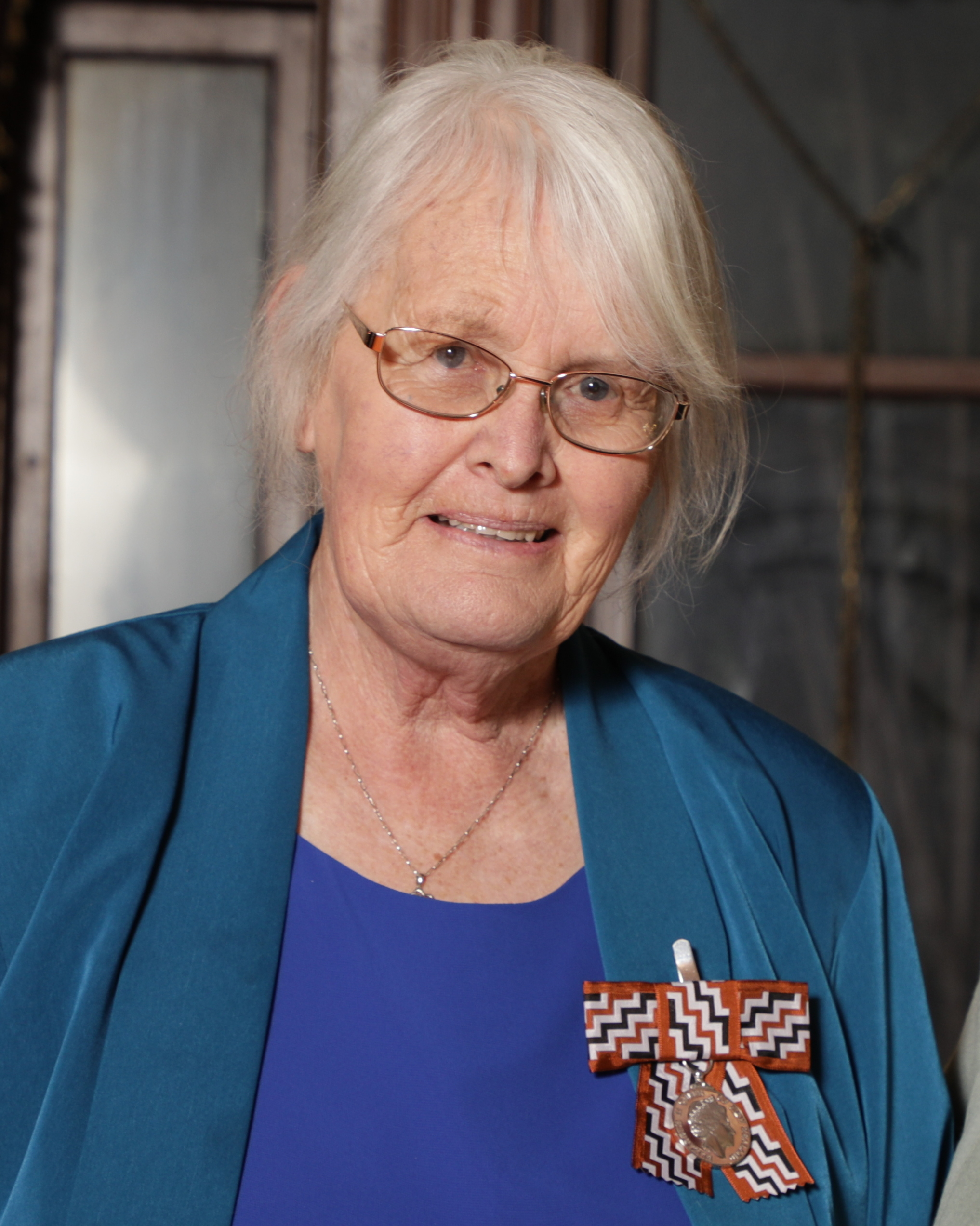
Jan Pentecost

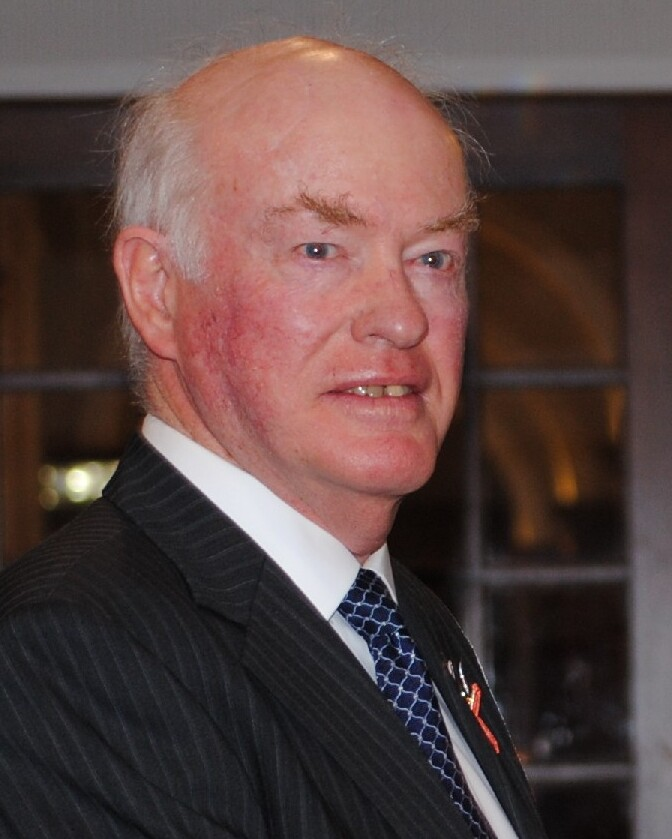
Lew Evans

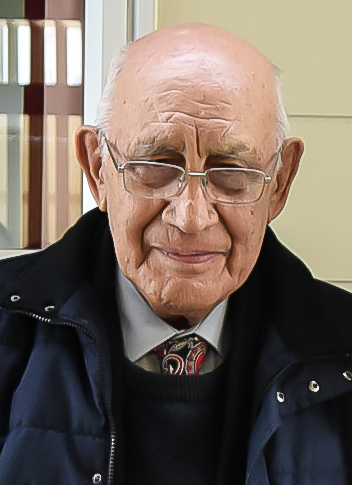
Sir Hirini Moko Mead

=== June ===
- 2 June – Robert Taylor, broadcaster (NZBC, Radio New Zealand, ABC Radio Perth), conservationist and poet, Mobil Radio Award for non-commercial personality of the year (1980) (born 1944).
- 3 June – Whatarangi Winiata, Māori leader (Ngāti Raukawa), economist (Victoria University of Wellington), chief executive of Te Wānanga o Raukawa (1994–2007), Māori Party president (2004–2009) (born 1935).
- 5 June – Roger Perry, DJ and record producer (born 1966).
- 8 June – Morris McFall, businessman, local politician and philanthropist, Waikato Regional Councillor (1992–2001) (born 1935).
- 13 June – Roger Cook, journalist and broadcaster (The Cook Report), BAFTA special award (1998) (born 1943).
- 14 June – Mike Duncan, graphic journalist (Dominion Post) and politician, Porirua City Councillor (since 2016) (born 1950).
- 16 June – David Kinsella, cricket player (Central Districts) and umpire (born 1937).
- 17 June – Margaret Clark, geologist and mountaineer, member of first all-women's team to summit Denali (born 1935).
- 18 June
  - Bob Jolly, veterinary scientist (Massey University), Hector Medal (1995), Fellow of the Royal Society of New Zealand (since 1985) (born 1930).
  - Russell Robinson, cricketer (Wellington) and billiards player (born 1946).
- 19 June – Savabeel, Hall of Fame Thoroughbred racehorse and sire, W. S. Cox Plate (2004), Spring Champion Stakes (2004) (foaled 2001).
- 23 June – Bob Blair, cricket player (Wellingon, national team) and coach (Matabeleland) (born 1932).
- 26 June – Mike O'Connor, field hockey player (national team) and educator, principal of Queen Elizabeth College (1980–1989) and Awatapu College (1990–1996) (born 1936).
- 29 June – Les Mills, Hall of Fame Olympic field athlete (1960, 1964, 1968, 1972), British Empire and Commonwealth Games gold medallist (1966), Hall of Fame businessman, politician, Mayor of Auckland City (1990–1998) (born 1934).
- 30 June – Mary Brito, cricketer (South Australia) and cricket administrator, chair of the New Zealand Women's Cricket Council (1974–1985), president of the International Women's Cricket Council (1995–2000) (born 1931).
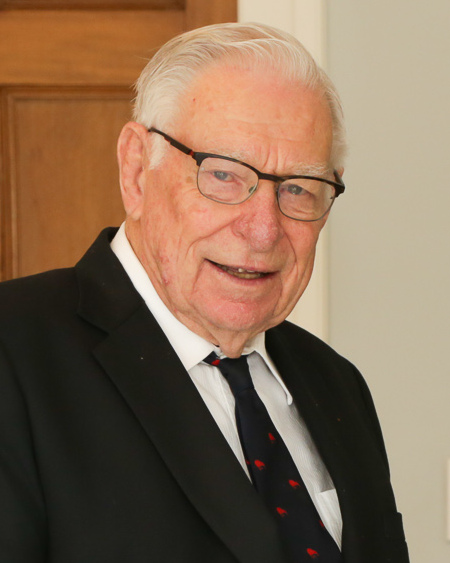
Morris McFall

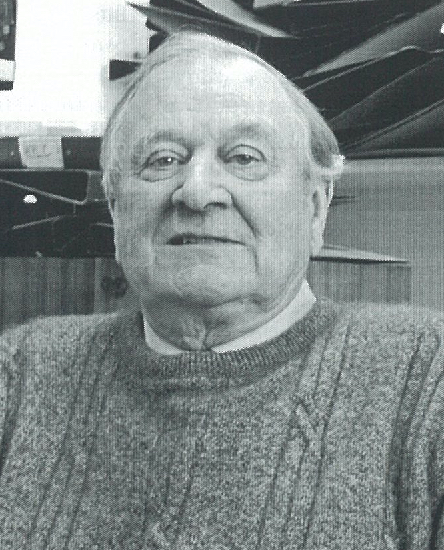
Bob Jolly

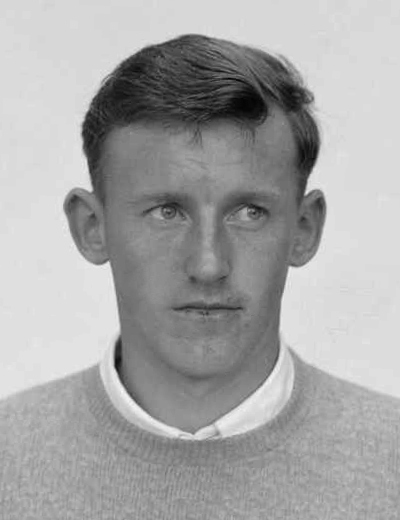
Bob Blair

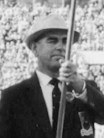
Les Mills

=== July ===
- 2 July
  - Barry Freeman, cricketer (Otago) (born 1948).
  - Graham Malaghan, businessman and philanthropist, chair of the Malaghan Institute of Medical Research (1990–2023) (born 1943).
- 3 July – Kelvin Coe, local politician, Mayor of Selwyn (2007–2016) (born 1944).
- 4 July – Robbie Francevic, motor racing driver, Australian Touring Car Championship winner (1986) (born 1941).
- 6 July – Jeff Scholes, potter (born 1942).
- 8 July – Dame Deirdre Milne, lawyer and feminist (born 1939).
- 10 July
  - Andy Bickers, musician (Cold Chisel, Moving Pictures) (born c. 1970).
  - Derryn Hinch, journalist (Taranaki Herald, The Sun), media personality (Hinch Live) and politician, Victorian senator (2016–2019) (born 1944).
- 12 July – Sir Sam Neill, actor (Reilly, Ace of Spies, Jurassic Park, Hunt for the Wilderpeople) and entrepreneur, Arts Foundation of New Zealand Icon (since 2020) (born 1947).
- 14 July – Henare Kingi, Māori broadcaster and cultural advisor (born 1935).
- 16 July – Ronald Trubuhovich, physician, critical-care specialist (Auckland City Hospital) (born 1929).
- 17 July – Sir Bill Birch, politician, MP for Franklin (1972–1978, 1984–1987, 1993–1996), Rangiriri (1978–1984), Maramarua (1987–1993) and Port Waikato (1996–1999), Minister of Energy (1978–1984), Labour (1990–1993), Health (1993) and Finance (1993–1999) (born 1934).
- 18 July
  - Karl Lovell, rugby league player (Parramatta Eels, Sheffield Eagles, Cronulla-Sutherland) (born 1977).
  - Robert Wiremu, singer, composer, choral conductor and vocal coach and educator (University of Auckland) (born 1970).
- 20 July – Ralph Adams, public servant and conservationist, director of the New Zealand Wildlife Service (1979–1987) (born 1936).
- 22 July – Derek Williams, sound operator, camera operator and journalist (NZBC, CBS, AsiaWorks) (born 1946).
- 23 July – Dame Helene Quilter, public servant (Secretary of Defence, Deputy Commissioner of the State Services Commission, Deputy Public Service Commissioner) (born 1953).
- 24 July
  - Sir John Henry, lawyer and jurist, judge of the High Court (1984–1991) and Court of Appeal (1991–2004), King's Counsel (since 1980), Privy Counsellor (since 1996) (born 1932).
  - Ian Jamieson, medievalist (Victoria University of Wellington, University of Otago) (born 1939).
- 27 July
  - Mike Dudman, army officer and diplomat (born 1937).
  - Jim Hopkins, writer (Close to Home), talkback radio host (Radio Pacific, Radio Avon), and local politician, Banks Peninsula District Councillor (1989–2001), Waitaki District Councillor (since 2007), deputy mayor of Waitaki District (2010–2013) (born 1946).
- 28 July – David Trewavas, local politician, Taupō District Councillor (2001–2013), deputy mayor (2004–2007) and mayor of Taupō (2013–2025) (born c. 1963).
- 29 July
  - Erik Olssen, historian (University of Otago), Fellow of the Royal Society of New Zealand (since 1998) (born 1941).
  - Danny Schuster, viticulturist (born 1946).
- 30 July – Steve Milosavljevic, physiotherapist (University of Otago, University of Saskatchewan) (born 1952).
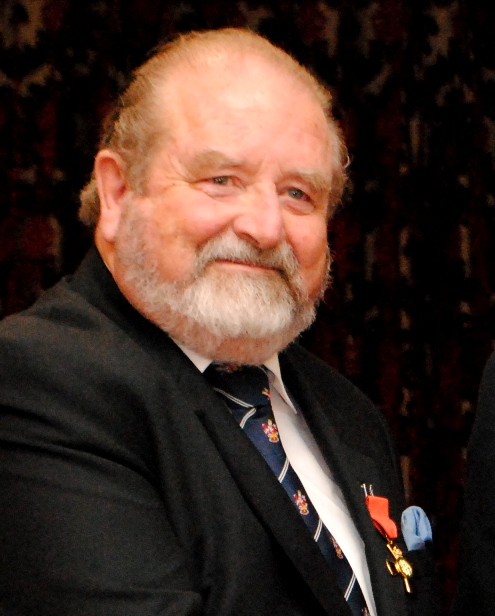
Graham Malaghan

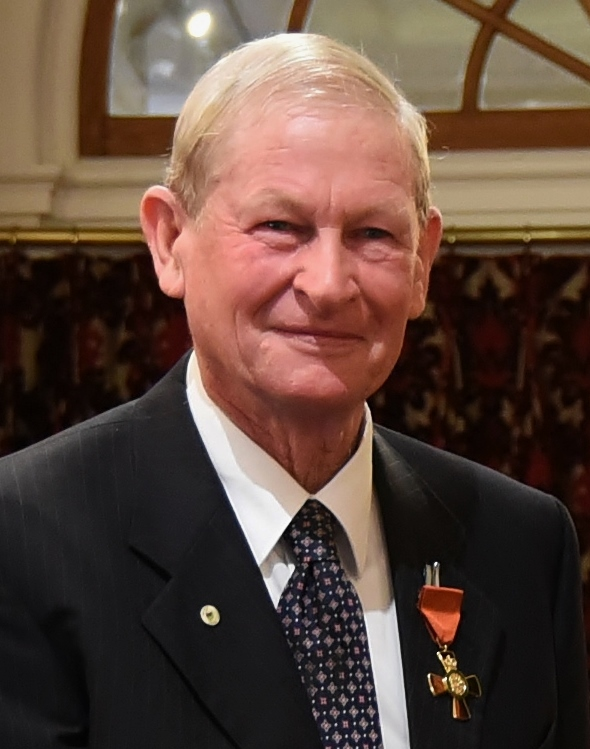
Kelvin Coe

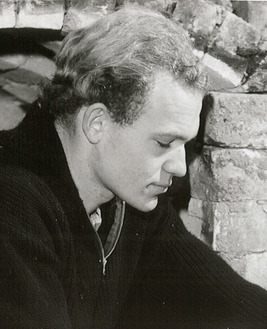
Jeff Scholes

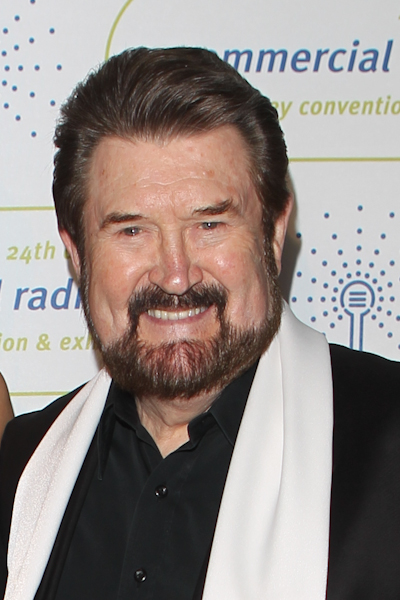
Derryn Hinch

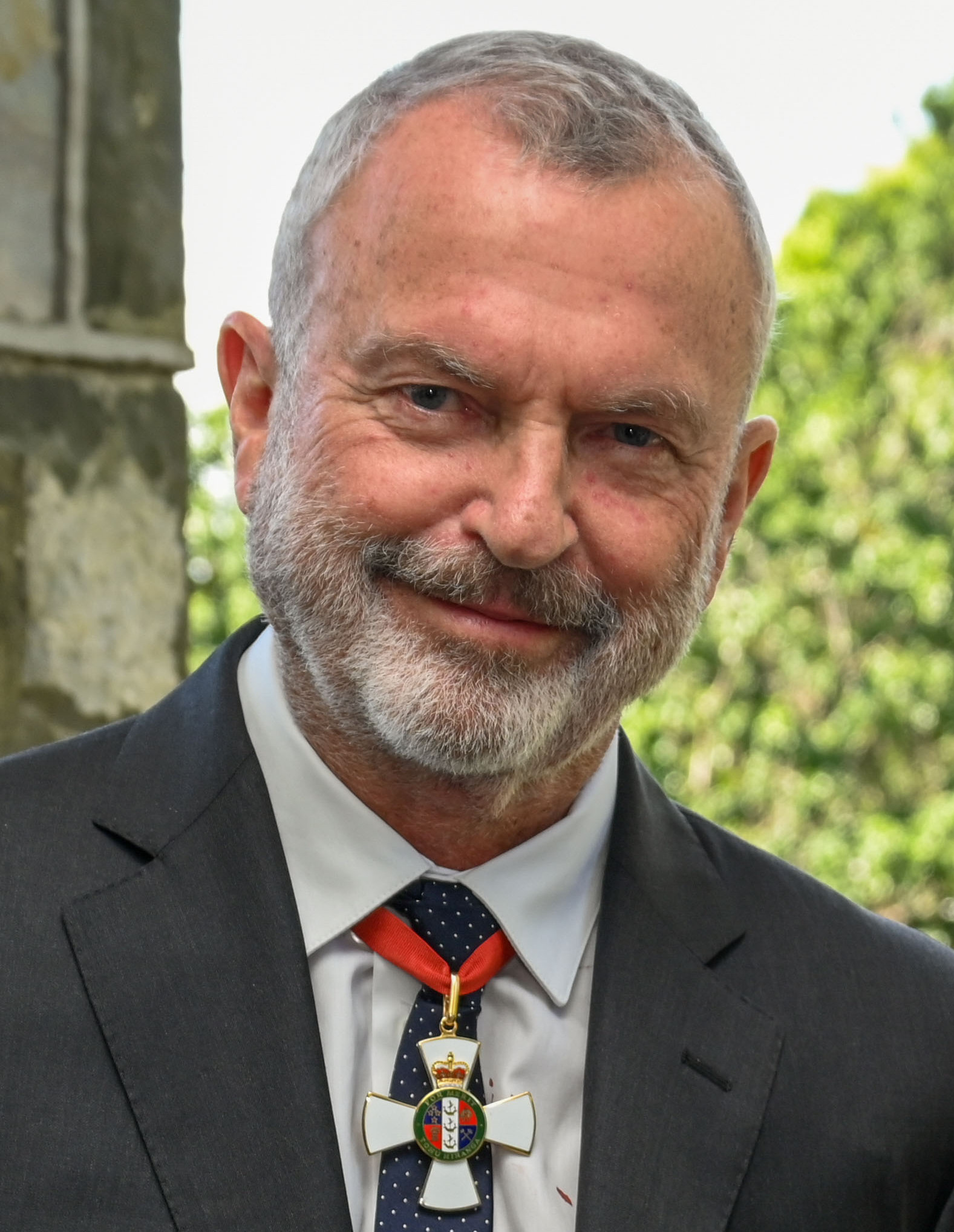
Sir Sam Neill

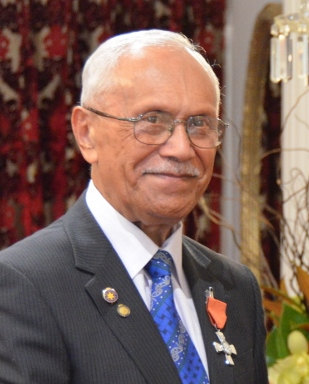
Henare Kingi

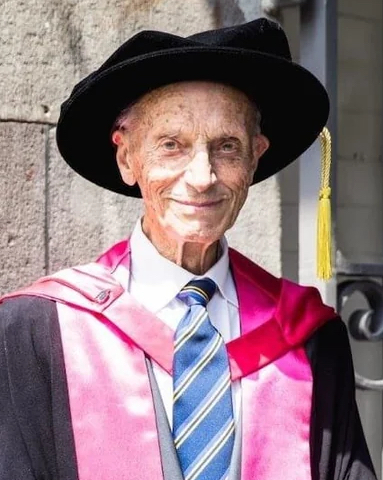
Ron Trubuhovich

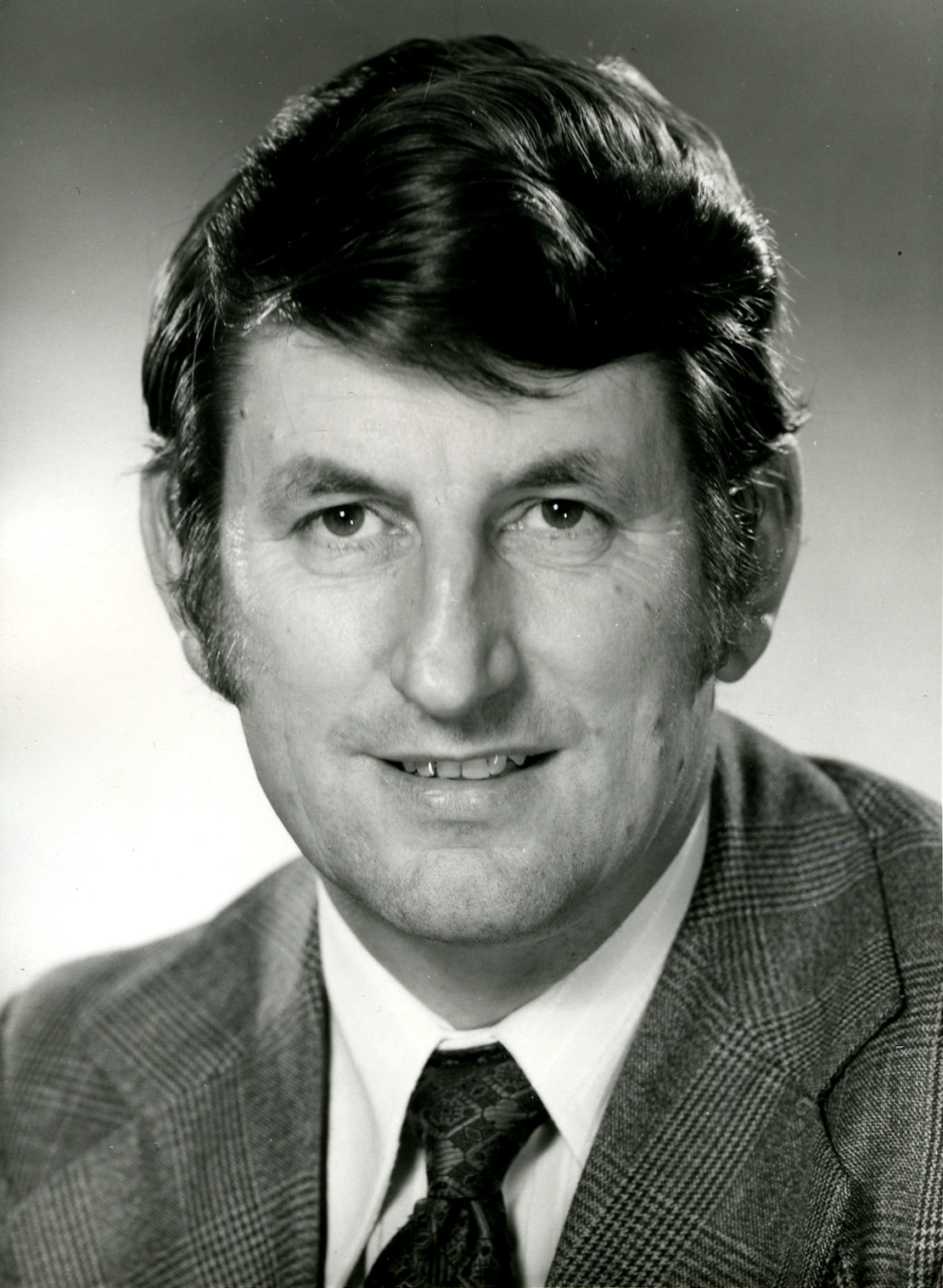
Sir Bill Birch

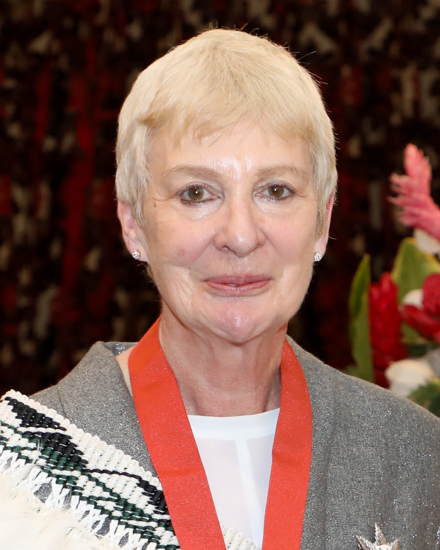
Dame Helene Quilter

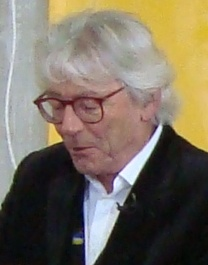
Jim Hopkins

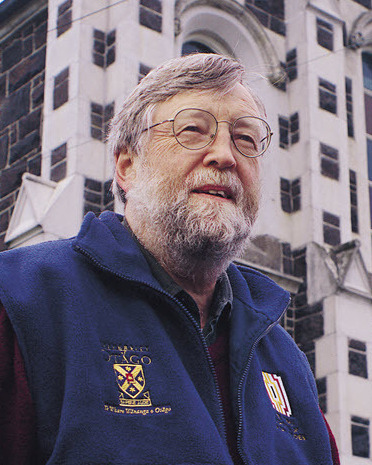
Erik Olssen

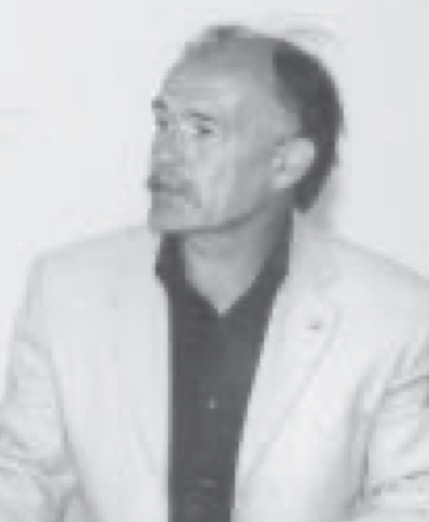
Danny Schuster

=== August ===
- 1 August
  - Nigel Bickle, public servant and local government administrator, chief executive of Hastings District Council (since 2019) (born 1969).
  - Joan Dougan, air force officer, head of the Women's Royal New Zealand Air Force (1975–1977) (born 1945).
- 4 August – Wayne Martin, cricketer (Central Districts) (born 1953).
- 7 August
  - Clinton Bird, urban designer (University of Auckland) (born 1950).
  - Tony Harris, entomologist (Otago Museum) (born 1943).
- 9 August
  - Graham Mortimer, paediatrician (University of Otago) (born 1932).
  - Ana Noovao, netball player (national team) and coach (Cook Islands national team), world championship silver medallist (1991) (born 1968).
  - Tony Randle, local politician, Wellington City Councillor (since 2022) (born 1960).
- 10 August
  - Riemke Ensing, poet (born 1939).
  - Richard Johnson, farmer and local politician, chair of Environment Canterbury (1989–2004) (born 1931).
  - Michael Powell, business academic (University of Auckland, Griffith University) (born 1946).
- 11 August – Laurie Keats, farmer and shearer, co-founder of the Golden Shears (born 1933).
- 13 August – Paul Cavanagh, lawyer, King's Counsel (since 1991) (born 1938).
- 14 August – Te Kepa Stirling, Māori educator (Te Kura Māori o Ngā Tapuwae) and kapa haka exponent (born 1938).
- 15 August – Errol Allison, artist (Gore trout statue, Hands of Fame) (born 1942).
- 16 August
  - Dave Denton, fishing advocate and outdoors retailer (born c. 1936).
  - Peter Fitzgerald, cytogeneticist, Fellow of the Royal Society of New Zealand (since 1984) (born 1929).
  - John Flaherty, cricketer (Otago) (born 1942).
  - Gail Ives, cricketer (Wellington) and teacher (Wellington Girls' College) (born 1965).
  - Garry Pedersen, motor racing driver, engineer and team owner (born 1942).
- 24 August – Brecon Carter, violinist and violin teacher, inaugural concertmaster of the Auckland Philharmonia (born 1941).
- 25 August – Peter Bromhead, designer and editorial cartoonist (Auckland Star) (born 1933).
- 27 August
  - Philippa Dunphy, financial analyst and company director, chair of Solid Energy (2014–2015) and Transpower (2019–2022) (born 1956).
  - Richard Hayward, cricketer (Buckinghamshire, Hampshire, Central Districts) and cricket coach, administrator and match referee (born 1954).
- 28 August – John Harris, physiologist (University of Otago) and winemaker (born 1940).
- 29 August – Neil Walter, public servant and diplomat, Administrator of Tokelau (1988–1990, 2003–2006), ambassador to Indonesia (1990–1994) and Japan (1998–1999), Secretary of Foreign Affairs (1999–2002), chair of NZ On Air (2007–2012) (born 1942).
- 30 August – Sister Pauline Leonard, religious sister and educator, principal of Sacred Heart Girls' College (1990–2004) (born 1939).
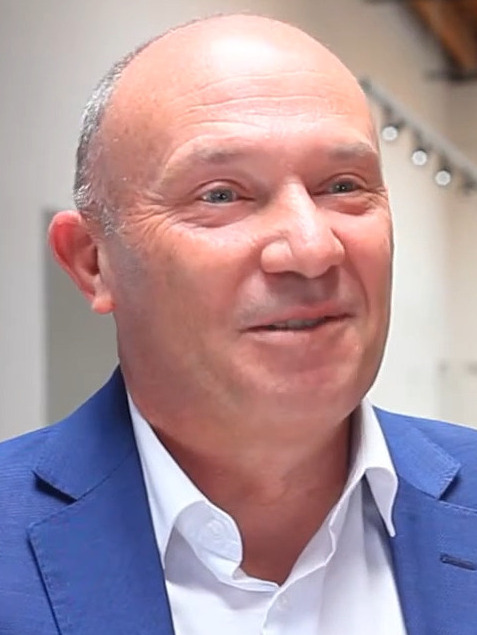
Nigel Bickle

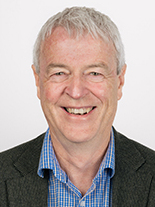
Tony Randle

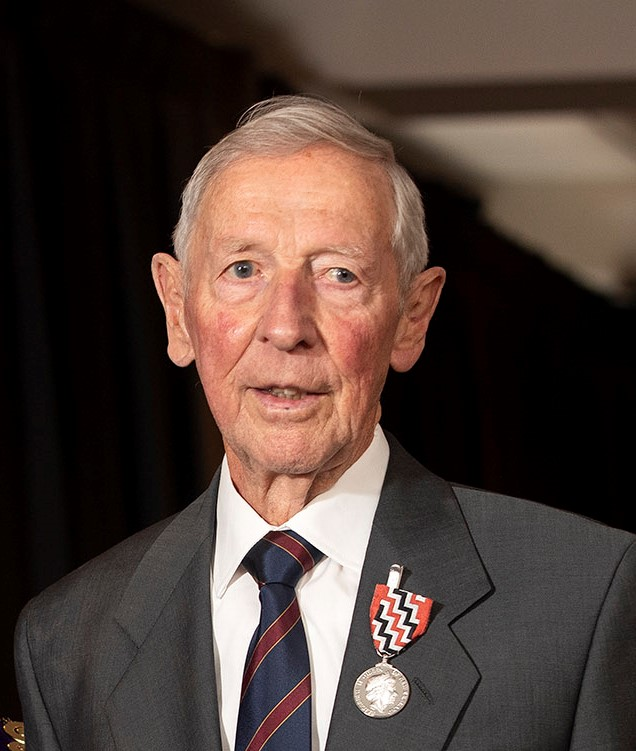
Dave Denton

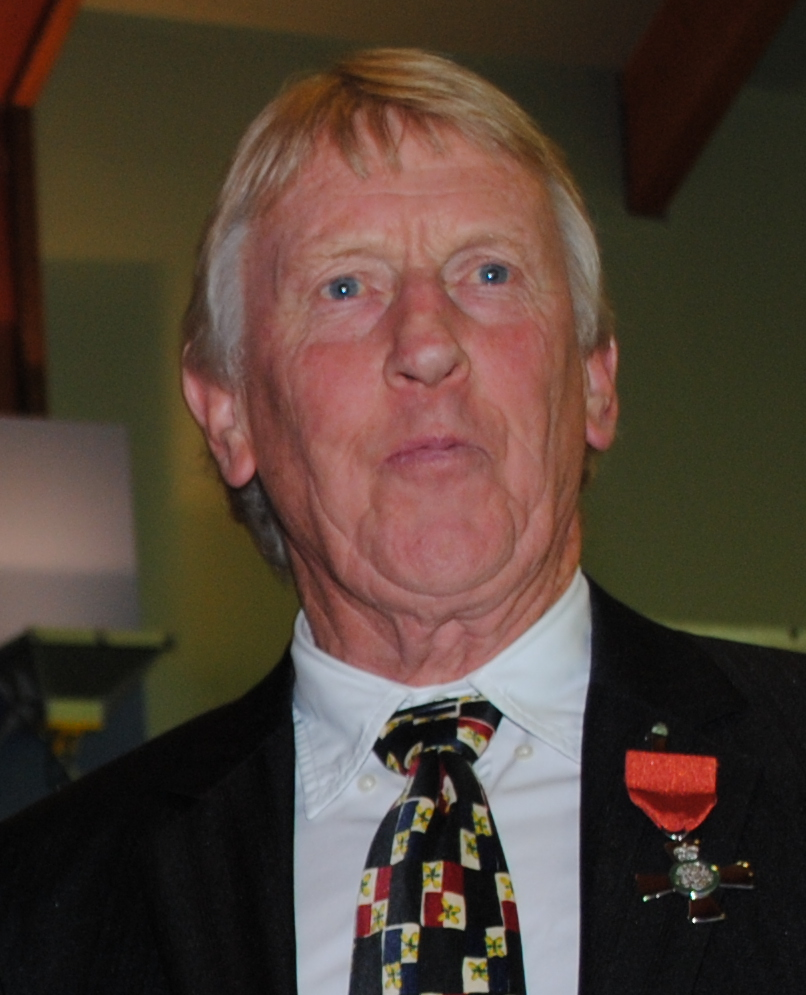
Garry Pedersen

=== September ===
- 1 September
  - Barry Cleavin, printmaker and art educator (University of Canterbury) (born 1939).
  - John Hastie, cricket umpire (born 1932).
- 2 September – Grahame Fraser, physicist (University of Canterbury) (born 1931).
- 7 September – Colleen Dennison, teacher (Otago Girls' High School) and cheesemaker, founder of Evansdale Cheese (1981) (born 1941).
- 8 September
  - Margaret Bedggood, legal academic (University of Otago, University of Waikato), Chief Human Rights Commissioner (1989–1994) (born 1939).
  - Paddy Payne, horseman (born c. 1936).
  - Grant Pirihi, Māori leader (Ngātiwai), politician and community leader, Whangarei County Councillor (1977–1983) (born 1939).
  - Jason Walker, musician (born 1969). (death announced on this date)
- 10 September
  - Ross Brown, architect (British High Commission) (born 1943).
  - George Gibbs, entomologist (Victoria University of Wellington), president of the Entomological Society of New Zealand (1976–1978) (born 1937).
  - Jack Inglis, community health advocate and local politician, Tasman District Councillor (2004–2016) (born 1937).
- 11 September – Dame Margaret Clark, political scientist (University of Melbourne, City University of New York, Victoria University of Wellington) (born 1941).
- 12 September – Rodney Charters, cinematographer (24, The Pretender, Going in Style) (born 1945).
- 15 September
  - John Broughton, dental and Māori health academic (University of Otago), and playwright, Bruce Mason Playwriting Award (1990) (born 1947).
  - Jim Peters, educator and politician, principal of Northland College (1987–2002), chair of Northland Regional Council (1995–2001), New Zealand First list MP (2002–2005), pro vice-chancellor (Māori) of the University of Auckland (2006–2018) (born 1937).
- 17 September
  - Colin Bassett, forest scientist (Forest Research Institute), science administrator and writer, director of the Forest Research Institute (1972–1987) (born 1929).
  - Ginger Molloy, motorcycle racer (born 1937).
- 19 September
  - Wendy Harrex, publisher (Oxford University Press, Otago University Press) and environmentalist, founder of New Women's Press (1982) (born 1946).
  - John Hughes, interior designer (born 1944).
- 20 September
  - Mike Beard, haematologist (St Bartholomew's Hospital, Christchurch Hospital) (born 1932).
  - Cameron Bell, rugby league coach (Auckland, Carlisle, New Zealand Māori) (born 1939).
- 22 September – Sir John Mace, army officer, Chief of the General Staff (1984–1987), Chief of Defence Staff (1987–1991) (born 1932).
- 23 September – Cathy Downes, security and defence studies academic (National Defense University, Victoria University of Wellington) (born c. 1959).
- 26 September – Peter Barrett, geologist and Antarctic scientist (Victoria University of Wellington), Fellow of the Royal Society of New Zealand (since 1993), Marsden Medal (2004) (born 1940).
- 28 September – Kirsty Lay, fashion model (Ford Modeling Agency), New Zealand Face of the 80s (1983) (born 1962).
- 29 September – Phil Gifford, sports journalist (New Zealand Herald, Auckland Star, Sunday Star-Times), broadcaster (Radio Hauraki, 91ZM, Newstalk ZB) and biographer (Alex Wyllie, Valerie Adams, Wayne Smith) (born 1947).
- 30 September
  - Robert Kururangi, rugby union player (Counties, New Zealand Māori, national team) (born 1957).
  - Adrian Rurawhe, politician and Māori leader (Ngāti Apa), MP for Te Tai Hauāuru (2014–2023) and Labour list MP (2023–2026), Speaker of the House of Representatives (2022–2023) (born 1961).
Barry Cleavin

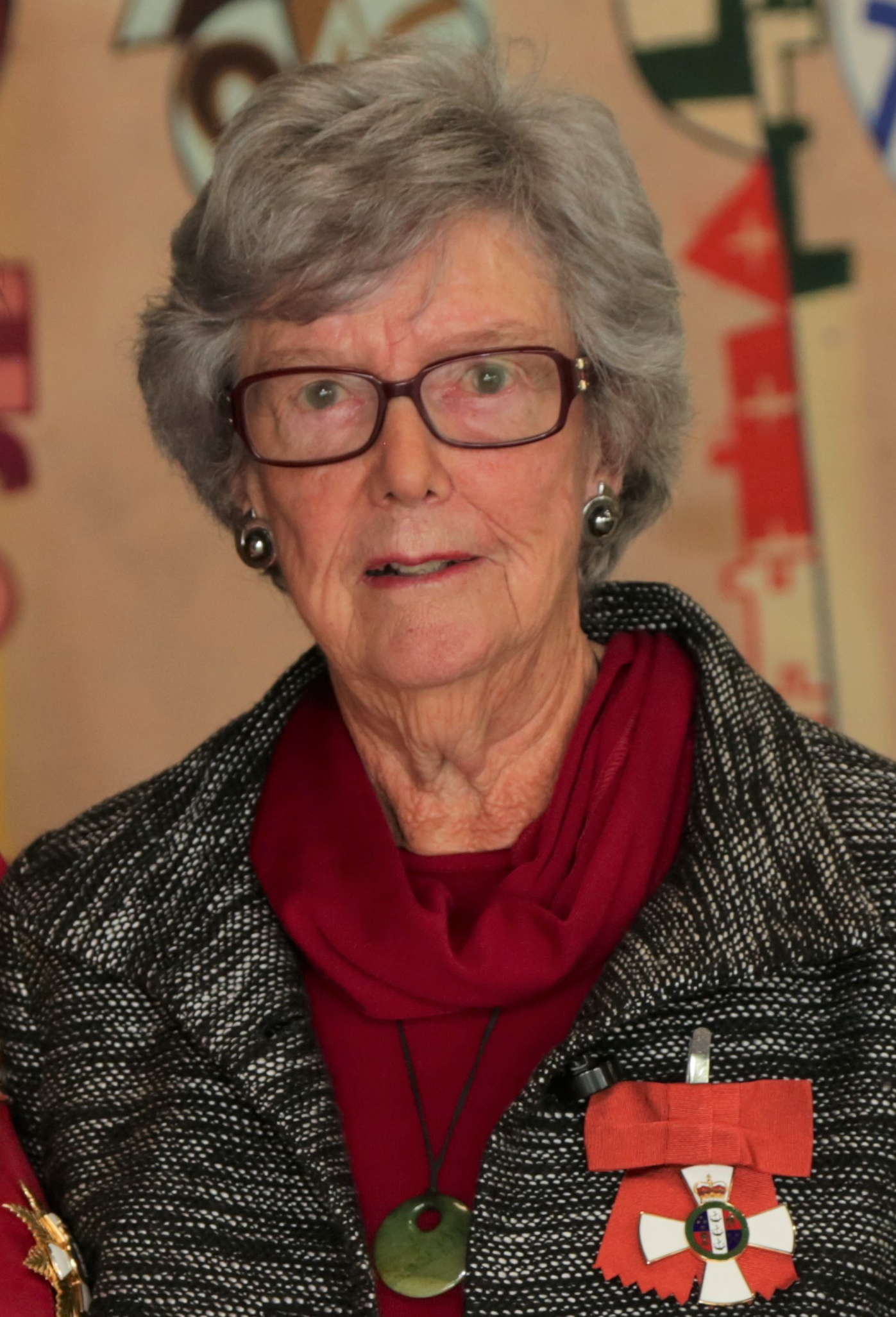
Margaret Bedggood

Grant Pirihi

Jack Inglis

John Broughton

Cathy Downes

Peter Barrett

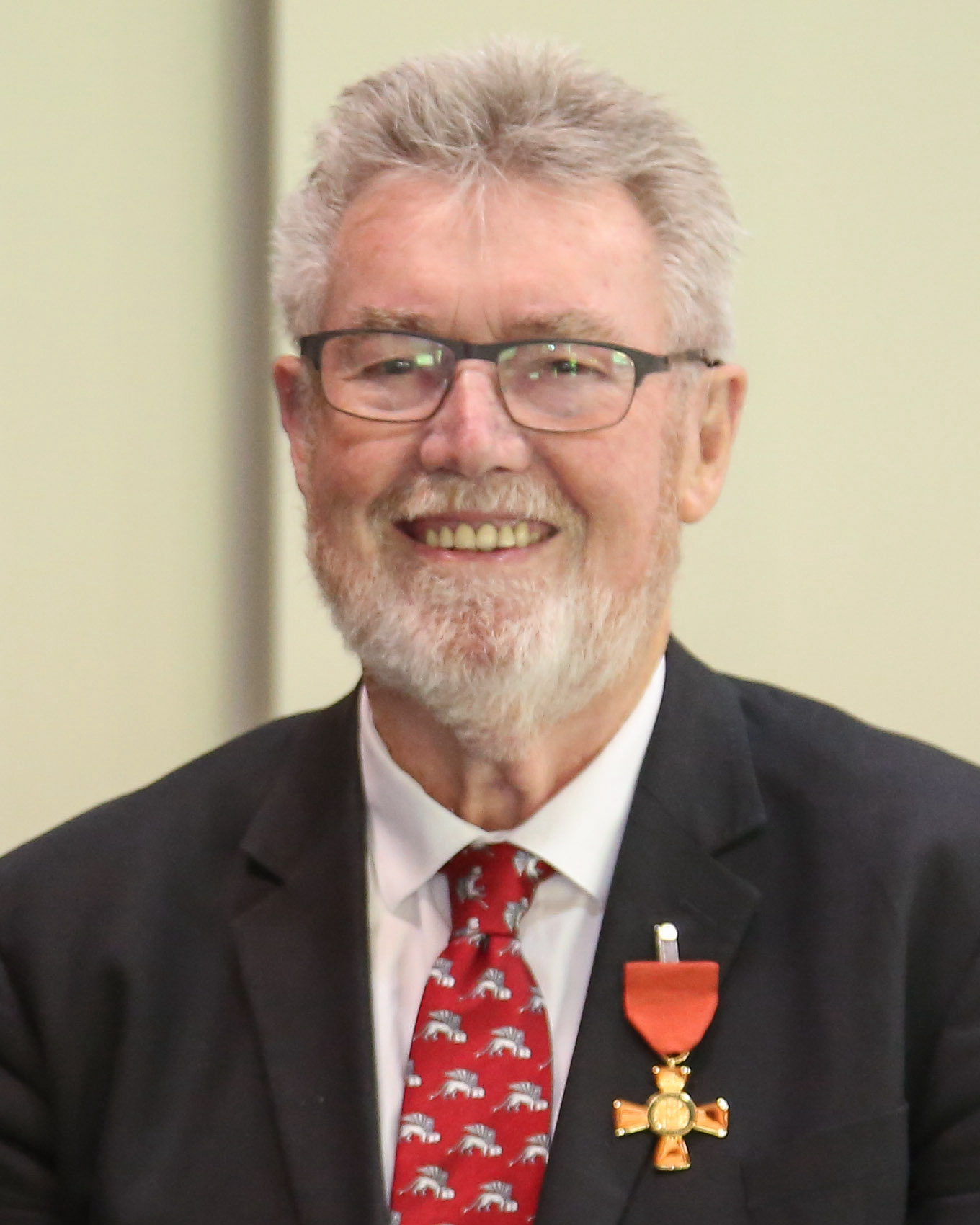
Phil Gifford

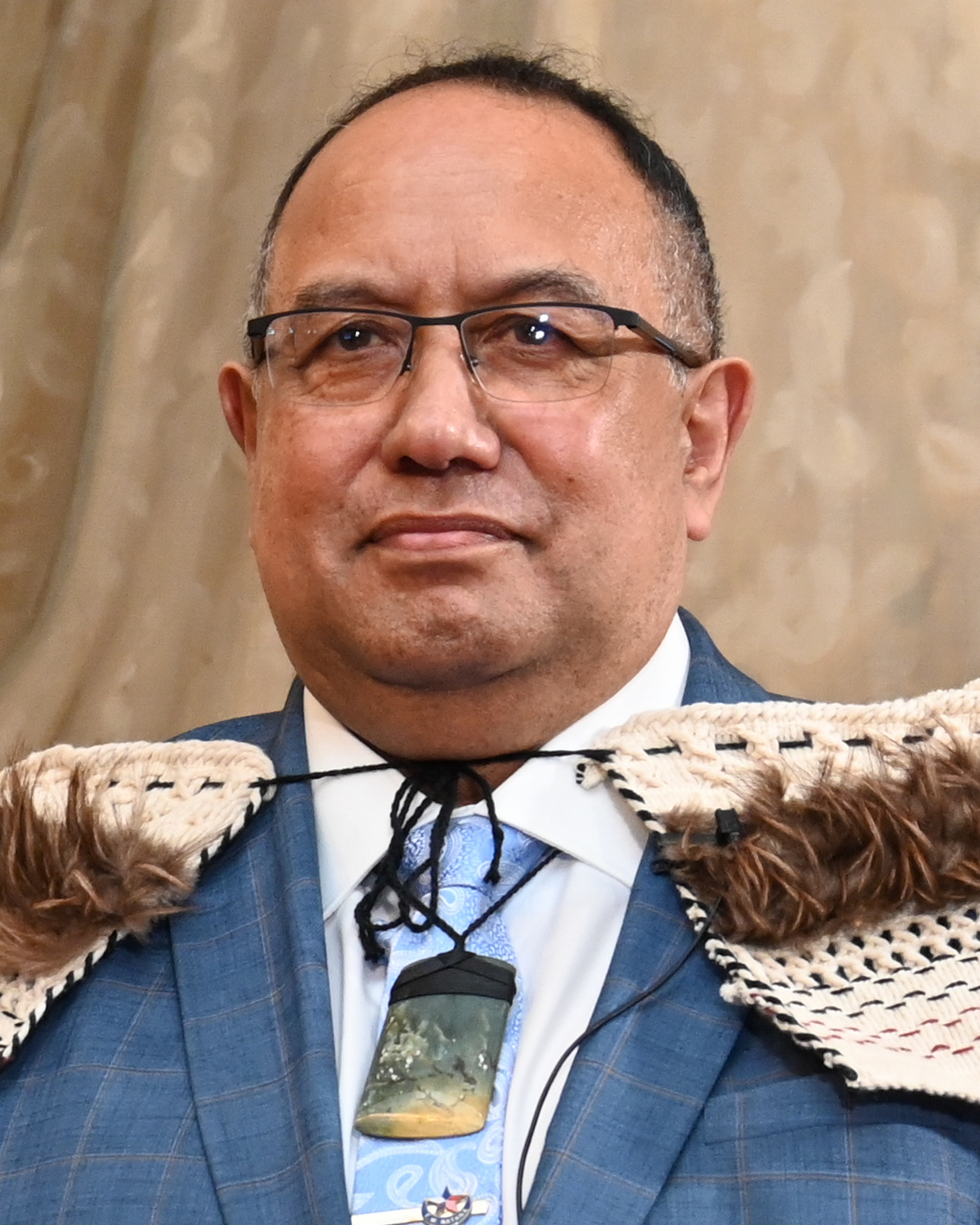
Adrian Rurawhe

=== October ===
- 2 October – Bruce Hansen, Presbyterian minister, Moderator of the General Assembly (1998–2000) (born 1943).
- 3 October – Colin Mantell, obstetrician, gynaecologist and Māori health academic (University of Auckland) (born 1939).
- 5 October
  - Margaret Cousins, local politician, Hutt City Councillor (1983–2019) (born c. 1949).
  - Merrick Sanderson, orthopaedic surgeon (Whangārei Hospital), deputy chair of Northland District Health Board (2007–2010) (born 1942).
- 9 October – John Klaricich, Māori leader (Ngāpuhi), local politician and community leader, chair of Hokianga County Council (1983–1987), Far North District Councillor (1989–2004) and deputy mayor (1998–2004), Ngā Tohu ā Tā Kingi Ihaka (2019) (born 1932).
- 11 October
  - Murray Laugesen, public health physician, public servant (Department of Health) and smoke-free environments advocate (born 1935).
  - Cheryl Waaka, rugby union player (Auckland, national team) and coach (Northland women), world champion (1998, 2002) (born 1970).
- 15 October – Danny Watson, television presenter (Spot On, What Now) and radio broadcaster (Newstalk ZB) (born c. 1953).
- 19 October – Geoff Thompson, politician, MP for Horowhenua (1978–1984), president of the National Party (1994–1998) (born 1940).
- 20 October
  - Lyndsay Rackley, broadcaster (Radio Dunedin) (born 1944).
  - Russell Stone, historian (University of Auckland) (born 1923).
- 21 October – Ken Ring, alternative weather forecaster (born 1945).
- 23 October – Pauline Parker, convicted murderer (Parker–Hulme murder case) (born 1938). (death announced on this date)
- 24 October
  - Arch Jelley, Hall of Fame athletics coach (John Walker, Neville Scott, Steve Scott) (born 1922).
  - Terry Shaw, cricketer (Northern Districts) and rugby union player (Thames Valley) (born 1937).
- 26 October – Sir David Gascoigne, lawyer, arts advocate and viceregal consort (2016–2021) (born 1940).
- 28 October – Kevin Gibbons, British Empire and Commonwealth Games pole vaulter (1962), seven-time national champion (born c. 1938).
- 31 October
  - Kevin Clark, architect and jazz musician, New Zealand Music Award for jazz album of the year (2003, 2005) (born 1940).
  - Kylie Wihapi, local politician, Porirua City Councillor (since 2016) and deputy mayor (since 2022) (born c. 1981).
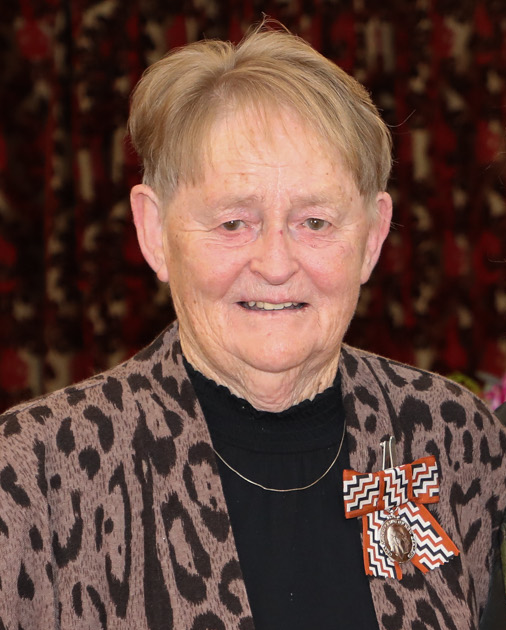
Margaret Cousins

Merrick Sanderson

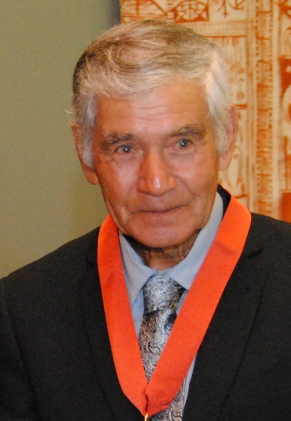
John Klaricich

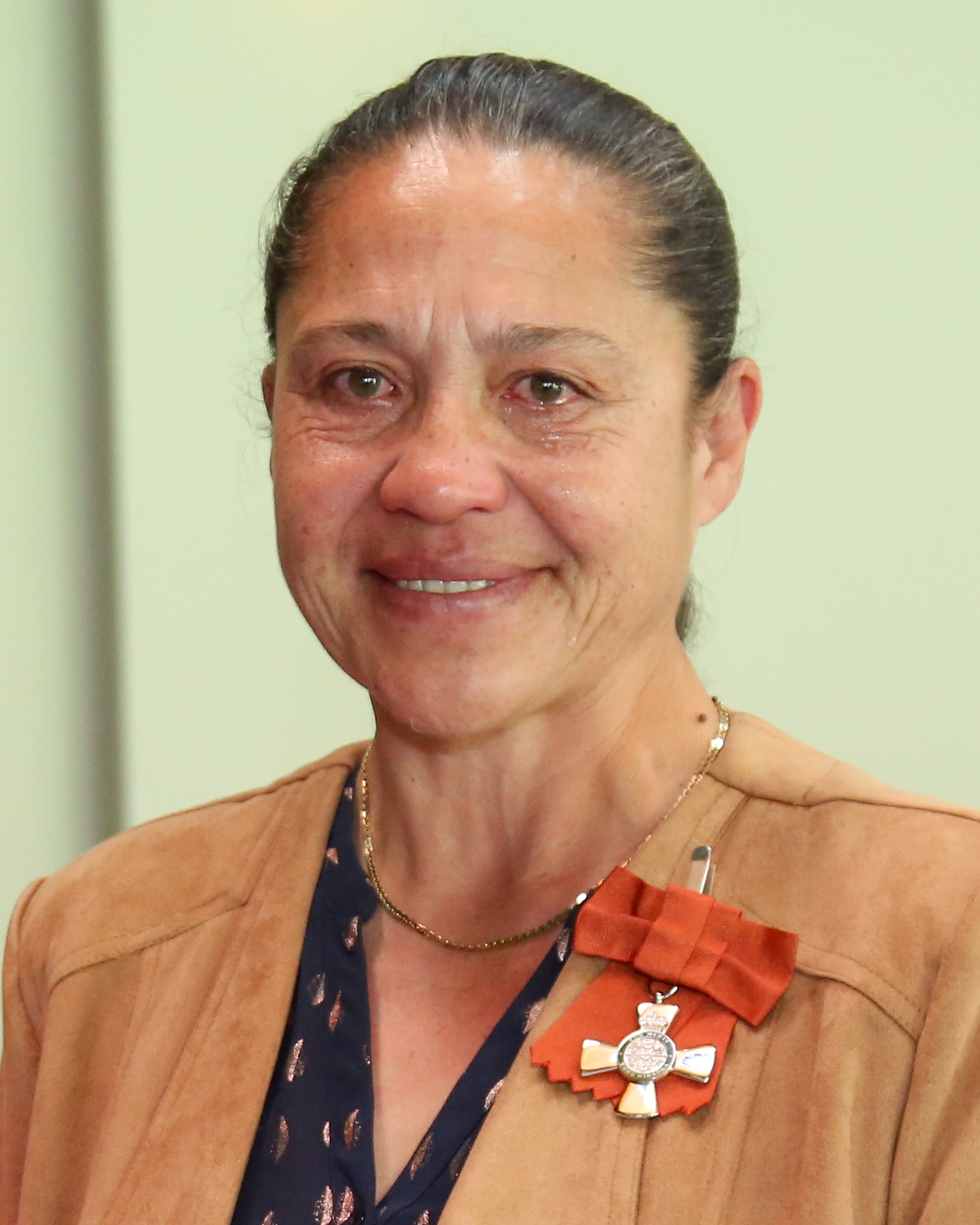
Cheryl Waaka

Lyndsay Rackley

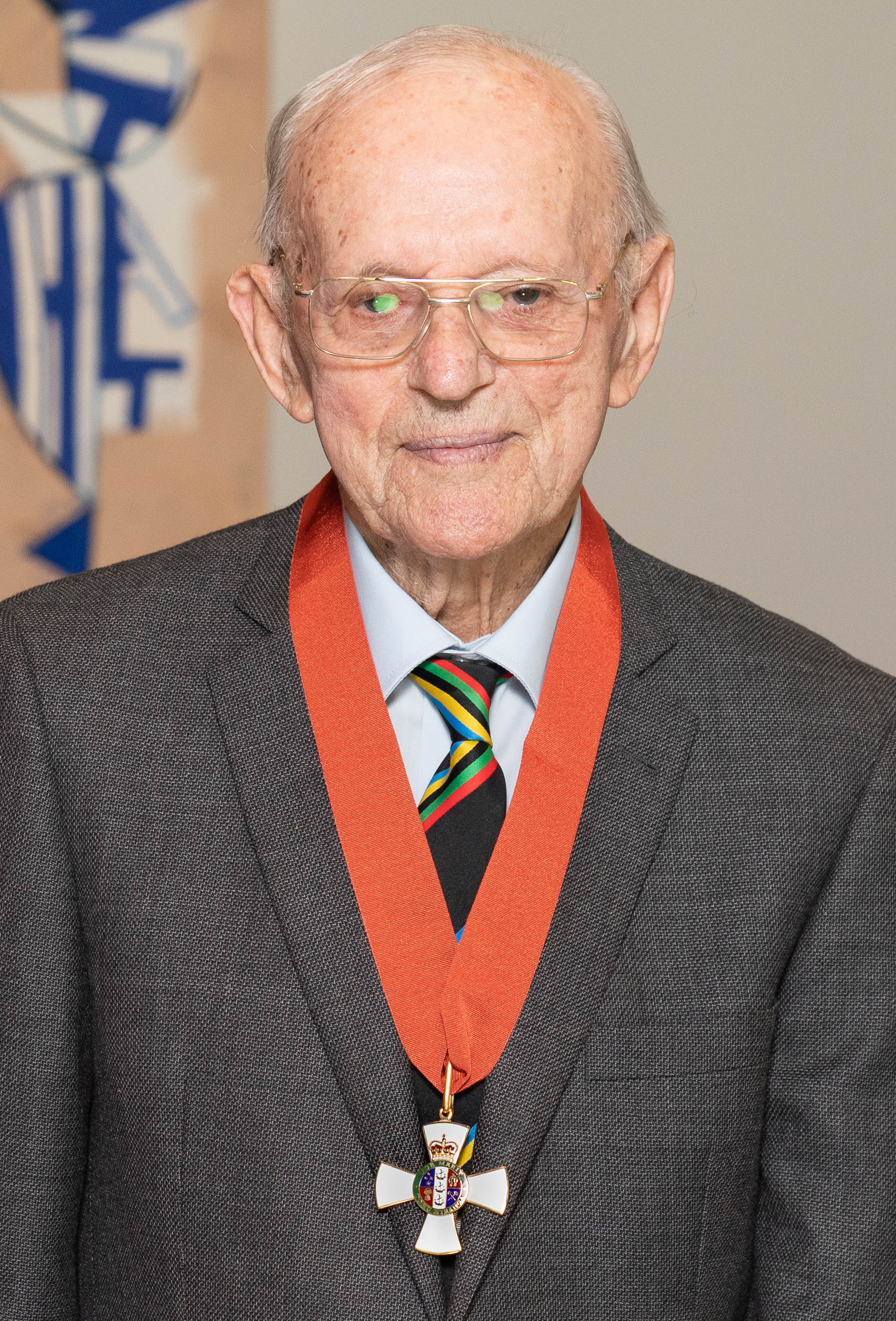
Arch Jelley

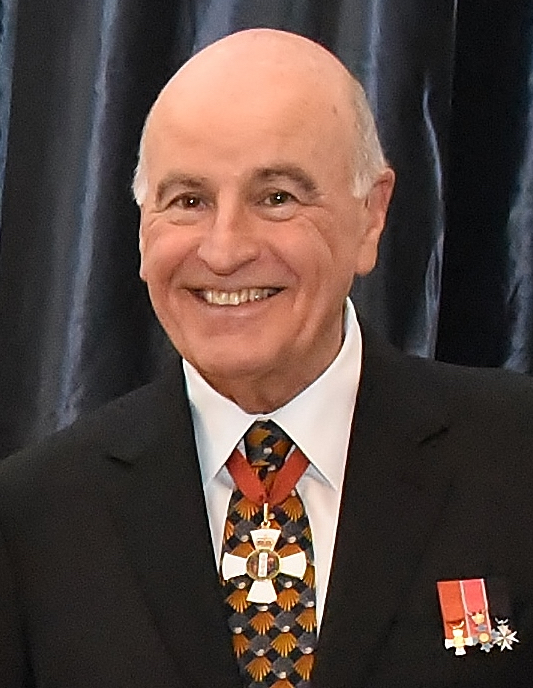
Sir David Gascoigne

Kevin Clark

=== November ===
- 3 November – Bill Glass, occupational health physician (Massey University), Senior New Zealander of the Year (2019) (born 1931).
- 5 November – Sir Lloyd Geering, Presbyterian minister and theologian (Victoria University of Wellington), Member of the Order of New Zealand (since 2006), New Zealand's oldest living man (since 2025) (born 1918).
- 7 November – Jeff Julian, Olympic (1960, 1964) and British Commonwealth Games (1962, 1966, 1970) marathon runner (born 1935).
- 8 November – Sir Pou Temara, Māori scholar (Victoria University of Wellington, University of Waikato, Te Whare Wānanga o Awanuiārangi) and leader (Ngāi Tūhoe), member of the Waitangi Tribunal (since 2008) and Tekau-mā-rua (since 2014) (born 1948).
- 9 November
  - Daryl Lilley, rugby union player (Taranaki, Crusaders, Hurricanes) (born 1974).
  - Brian Steele, rugby union player (Wellington, Horowhenua, national team), oldest living All Black (since 2025) (born 1929).
- 10 November
  - Dai Henwood, comedian (7 Days) and television host (Family Feud, Dancing with the Stars), Billy T Award (2002), Fred Award (2007, 2015) (born 1978).
  - Rhys McConnochie, actor (Bingo, Bodyline, Come in Spinner) and theatre director (born 1936).
- 11 November – Barry Thomas, accountant and businessman, chair of Skyline Enterprises (1975–2008) (born c. 1945).
- 14 November – Te Riaki Amoamo, Māori cultural expert (Te Whakatōhea, Ringatū) (born 1937).
- 15 November – John Bayley, Hall of Fame businessman and real estate agent (born c. 1948).
- 17 November – Daphne de Jong, romance novelist, poet and feminist writer (born 1939).
- 18 November – Sir John Hood, civil engineer (University of Auckland), business executive (Fletcher Challenge) and university administrator, vice-chancellor of the University of Auckland (1999–2004) and the University of Oxford (2004–2009) (born 1952).
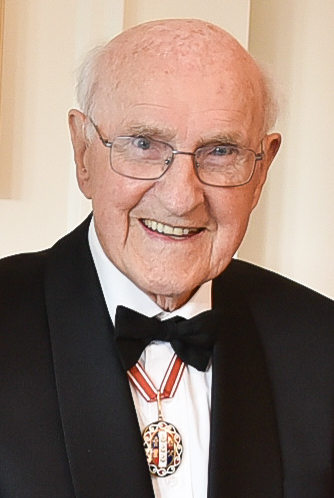
Sir Lloyd Geering

Jeff Julian

Sir Pou Temara

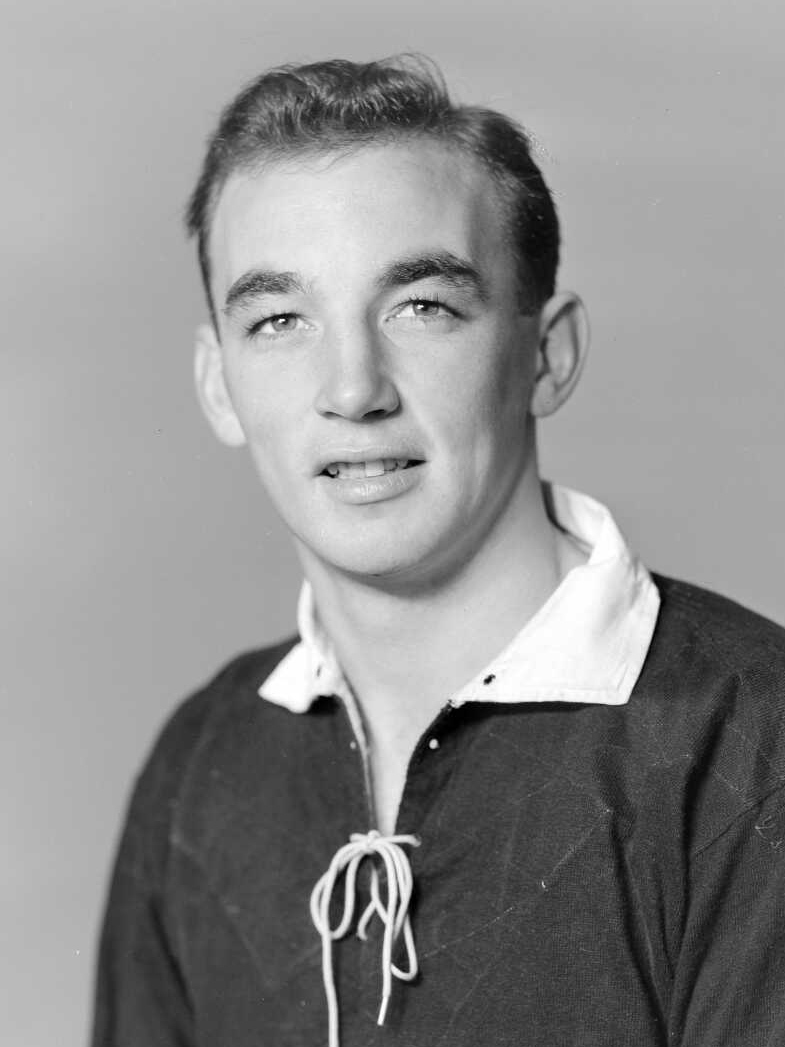
Brian Steele

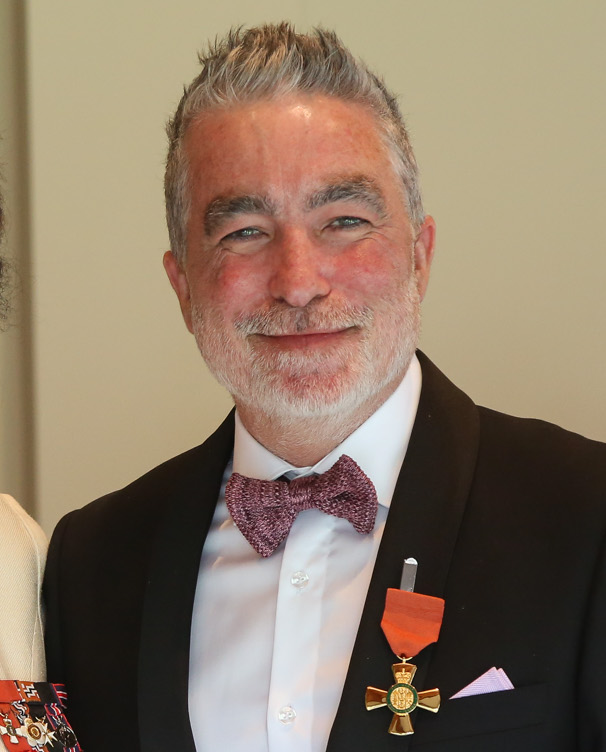
Dai Henwood

Barry Thomas

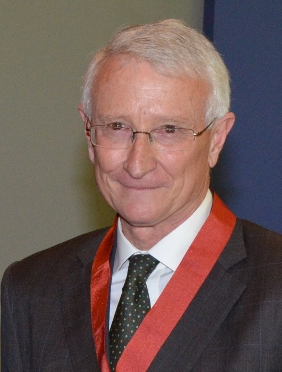
Sir John Hood
