= 1936 in New Zealand =

- Decades: 1910s; 1920s; 1930s; 1940s; 1950s
- See also: History of New Zealand; List of years in New Zealand; Timeline of New Zealand history

The following lists events that happened during 1936 in New Zealand.

The shape of New Zealand politics for the next five decades was defined when, in the aftermath of their heavy defeat by Labour, the United and Reform parties merged to form the New Zealand National Party. In the meantime, the Labour government began implementing significant social changes.

== Population ==
A New Zealand census was held in March 1936.

	Male	Female	Total
Usually resident population	796,152 (50.7%)	773,067 (49.3%)	1,569,216
Overseas Visitors	2,931	1,650	4,581
Total	799,092	774,720	1,573,812

== Incumbents ==
=== Regal and viceregal ===
- Head of State – George V (until 20 January), Edward VIII (20 January to 11 December), George VI
- Governor-General – The Viscount Galway GCMG DSO OBE PC

=== Government ===
The 25th New Zealand Parliament continued with the Labour Party in government.

- Speaker of the House – Bill Barnard (Labour Party)
- Prime Minister – Michael Joseph Savage
- Minister of Finance – Walter Nash
- Minister of Foreign Affairs – Michael Joseph Savage
- Attorney-General – Rex Mason
- Chief Justice – Sir Michael Myers

=== Parliamentary opposition ===
- Leader of the Opposition – George Forbes (United/Reform Party until May, then National Party), succeeded in November by Adam Hamilton (National).

=== Main centre leaders ===
- Mayor of Auckland – Ernest Davis
- Mayor of Wellington – Thomas Hislop
- Mayor of Christchurch – Dan Sullivan then John Beanland
- Mayor of Dunedin – Edwin Thomas Cox

== Events ==
- 25 March – First session of the 25th Parliament commences.
- 11 June – Parliament goes into recess.
- 21 June – Parliament resumes.
- 30 August – Train derails near Paraparaumu due to a landslide in heavy rain.
- 31 October – First session of the 25th Parliament concludes.

== Arts and literature ==
See 1936 in art, 1936 in literature, Category:1936 books

=== Music ===
See: 1936 in music

=== Radio ===
- Radio broadcasting of sessions of Parliament commences.

See: Public broadcasting in New Zealand

=== Film ===
- Phar Lap's Son
- The Wagon and the Star
- On the Friendly Road

See: Category:1936 film awards, 1936 in film, List of New Zealand feature films, Cinema of New Zealand, Category:1936 films

== Sport ==
=== Chess ===
- The 45th National Chess Championship was held in Christchurch, and was won by A.W. Gyles of Wellington.

=== Golf ===
- The 26th New Zealand Open championship was won by Andrew Shaw, his 7th title.
- The 40th National Amateur Championships were held in New Plymouth
  - Men: J.P. Hornabrook (Manawatu)
  - Women: Miss E. White-Parsons

=== Horse racing ===
==== Harness racing ====
- New Zealand Trotting Cup – Indianapolis (3rd win)
- Auckland Trotting Cup – King's Warrior

=== Lawn bowls ===
The national outdoor lawn bowls championships are held in Christchurch.

- Men's singles champion – Frank Livingstone (Onehunga Bowling Club)
- Men's pair champions – J.W. Turpin, H. Haworth (skip) (Canterbury Bowling Club)
- Men's fours champions – C.H. Elsom, J.W. Turpin, C.J. Shaw, R. Haworth (skip) (Canterbury Bowling Club)

=== Olympic Games ===
Gold	Silver	Bronze	Total
1	0	0	1

=== Rugby league ===
New Zealand national rugby league team

=== Rugby union ===
Category:Rugby union in New Zealand, Category:All Blacks

- Ranfurly Shield

=== Shooting ===
- Ballinger Belt – William Masefield (Blenheim)

=== Soccer ===
- An Australian national side tours New Zealand, beating the home team heavily in all three internationals:
  - 4 July, Dunedin: NZ 1–7 Australia
  - 11 July, Wellington: NZ 0–10 Australia
  - 18 July, Auckland: NZ 1–4 Australia
- The Chatham Cup is won by Western of Christchurch who beat Auckland Thistle 3–2 in the final.
- Provincial league champions:
  - Auckland: Thistle
  - Canterbury: Western
  - Hawke's Bay: Watersiders
  - Nelson: YMCA
  - Otago: Seacliff
  - Southland: Corinthians
  - Wanganui: Thistle
  - Wellington: Hospital

== Births ==
=== January ===
- 5 January
  - Reg Hart, rugby league player
  - Terry Lineen, rugby union player
- 6 January – Terence O'Brien, diplomat
- 7 January
  - Denis Pain, jurist, sports administrator
  - Alan Powell, historian
- 8 January – John McCullough, rugby union player
- 12 January – Graham Billing, writer
- 13 January – Michael Selby, geomorphologist, university administrator
- 18 January – Hugh Anderson, motorcycle racer
- 21 January – Helen Clark, marine zoologist
- 22 January
  - Robert Anderson, politician
  - Don McIver, army general
  - Nyree Dawn Porter, actor
- 31 January – Georgina Kirby, Māori leader, women's rights activist

=== February ===
- 3 February – Graham Finlay, boxer
- 10 February – Gerald Stewart, cricketer
- 11 February – Bramwell Cook, gastroenterologist
- 12 February – Jane Ritchie, psychologist
- 13 February – Steve Nesbit, rugby union player
- 15 February – Russell Marshall, politician, diplomat
- 16 February
  - Bruce Beetham, politician
  - Noel Everett, sailor
- 18 February – Pavel Tichý, logician
- 21 February – Bev Brentnall, cricketer
- 28 February – Dot Coleman, fencer

=== March ===
- 10 March – David Harrington, local-body politician
- 14 March
  - Kevin Barry, boxing coach
  - Bob Charles, golfer
- 19 March – Robert Carswell, cricketer
- 21 March – Margaret Mahy, writer
- 22 March – Douglas Gray, cricketer
- 24 March
  - Wally Hirsh, public servant, writer
  - James Morrison, cricketer
- 25 March – Julian Jack, physiologist

=== April ===
- 1 April – Desmond Park, cricketer
- 3 April – Tama Poata, writer, actor, human rights activist
- 5 April – Robin Carrell, haematologist
- 9 April – Mary Webb, cricketer
- 15 April – Michael Brown, Anglican priest
- 19 April – Anthony Small, cricketer
- 22 April
  - Kevin Barry, rugby union player
  - Glen Evans, local-body politician
- 23 April – John D'Arcy, cricketer
- 24 April – Ngai Tupa, Cook Islands politician
- 26 April – Robert Mahuta, Māori leader, academic
- 27 April
  - Peter Nicholls, sculptor
  - Betty Steffensen, netball player, coach, umpire and administrator
- 28 April – Ans Westra, photographer
- 29 April – Peter Atkins, Anglican bishop

=== May ===
- 1 May – Glenys Arthur, neurologist
- 3 May – Raymond Hawthorne, theatre director
- 6 May
  - Pat Walsh, rugby union player and selector
  - Cliff Whiting, artist, heritage advocate
- 7 May – Kenneth Ferries, cricketer
- 8 May – Ruia Morrison, tennis player
- 29 May – Murray Mills, Anglican bishop
- 30 May – Roy Harford, cricketer

=== June ===
- 2 June – James Wright, cricketer
- 3 June – Colin Meads, rugby union player
- 4 June – Robert Kelly, cricketer
- 6 June – Precious McKenzie, weightlifter
- 16 June – Graeme Barrow, author
- 18 June – Denny Hulme, racing driver
- 21 June – Colin Nicholson, lawyer, judge
- 23 June – Richard Johnstone, cyclist, cycling coach
- 30 June – Peter Bloomfield, cricketer

=== July ===
- 1 July
  - Jonathan Elworthy, politician
  - Jim Savage, athlete
- 16 July
  - Tamati Reedy, rugby union player, public servant, academic
  - Rob Storey, farmers' leader, politician
- 23 July – Graham Buist, cricketer
- 24 July – Thomas O'Neil, cricketer
- 28 July – Donald Eagle, cyclist
- 31 July – Mike Watt, sport shooter

=== August ===
- 1 August – Elizabeth McRae, actor
- 5 August – Bruce Stewart, playwright
- 7 August – Joy Cowley, author
- 8 August – David Penman, Anglican archbishop
- 10 August – Marilyn Pryor, anti-abortion activist
- 13 August
  - Bob Graham, rugby union player and coach
  - George Newton, weightlifter
- 15 August
  - Hamish Keith, writer, art curator
  - Trevor Moffitt, artist
  - J. B. Munro, politician, disability advocate
- 19 August – Norman Woods, cricketer
- 20 August – Kevin Briscoe, rugby union player
- 23 August – John Stopford, rugby league player

=== September ===
- 1 September – Selwyn Cushing, businessman
- 7 September – Alistair Soper, rugby union player
- 9 September – Dorothy Grover, philosopher
- 10 September
  - Howard Carter, Pentecostal Christian leader
  - Michael Corballis, psychologist
  - Michael Hartshorn, organic chemist
  - Bill Massey, softball player, coach and umpire
- 14 September – Robert Page, rowing coxswain
- 17 September – Barry Dineen, cricketer, rugby union player, businessman
- 18 September – Margaret Belcher, literary scholar
- 20 September – Murray McEwan, cricketer
- 21 September – Peter McLeavey, art dealer

=== October ===
- 4 October – Graham Davy, athlete, sports administrator
- 10 October
  - Artie Dick, cricketer
  - Carmen Rupe, drag performer, brothel keeper, LGBT rights activist
- 20 October – Jim Gerard, politician
- 23 October – Barry Sinclair, cricketer
- 31 October – Reuben Ngata, parasports competitor

=== November ===
- 6 November – Elva Simpson, netball player
- 9 November – Graham Hamer, rugby union coach
- 20 November – Graeme Tarr, cricketer
- 22 November – Ian Pool, demographer
- 23 November – Rex Pickering, rugby union player
- 24 November – Avinash Deobhakta, lawyer, judge
- 25 November – Jock Bilger, sailor
- 27 November – Terry O'Sullivan, rugby union player
- 29 November – Peter Cullinane, Roman Catholic bishop

=== December ===
- 5 December – Evelyn Stokes, geographer
- 12 December – Wilf Haskell, cricketer, sports historian
- 23 December – Paddy Donovan, boxer, rugby union player
- 25 December – Sonia Cox, badminton and tennis player

=== Undated ===
- Beau Vite, Thoroughbred racehorse
- David Beauchamp, civil engineer
- Michael Friedlander, businessman, philanthropist
- James Greig, potter
- High Caste, Thoroughbred racehorse
- Elric Hooper, actor, theatre director
- Judy Howat, lawn bowls player
- Sani Lakatani, Niuean politician
- Terry McGee, geographer
- Stanley Palmer, painter and printmaker
- Jenny Pattrick, novelist, jeweller
- John Riordan, jockey
- Jim Siers, author, filmmaker, record producer
- Adrienne Stewart, arts patron (born in Australia)
- Barrie Truman, association football coach
- David Vere-Jones, mathematical statistician
- Murray C. Wells, accountancy academic

== Deaths ==
=== January–March ===
- 5 January – Arthur Singe, rugby league player
- 16 January – Sir William Hall-Jones, politician, prime minister (1906) (born 1851)
- 20 January – James Clark, politician, mayor of Dunedin (1915–1919) (born 1870)
- 5 February – Timothy O'Connor, rugby union player (born 1860)
- 6 February – Edwin Bezar, soldier, author (born 1838)
- 8 February – Robert Holmes, civil engineer (born 1856)
- 19 February
  - Andrew Entrican, businessman, politician (born 1858)
  - Malcolm McGregor, World War I flying ace, aviation pioneer (born 1896)
- 3 March – Lucy Lovell-Smith, temperance worker and women's rights advocate (born 1861)
- 4 March – Arthur Henry Adams, journalist, author (born 1872)
- 10 March – David Kennedy, priest, astronomer (born 1864)
- 12 March – Janet Williamson, nurse (born 1862)
- 13 March
  - Sir Francis Bell, politician, mayor of Wellington (1891–1893), prime minister (1925) (born 1851)
  - Elizabeth Herriott, scientist, academic (born 1882)
- 14 March – William Holdship, cricketer (born 1872)
- 17 March – Albert Duder, mariner, harbourmaster (born 1856)
- 29 March – Forrest Ross, mountaineer, journalist, writer (born 1860)

=== April–June ===
- 18 April – John Swan, architect (born 1874)
- 21 April – Harold Smith, politician (born 1866)
- 5 May – Sir Joseph Kinsey, businessman, bibliophile, philanthropist (born 1852)
- 10 May
  - Donald Fuller, cricketer (born 1869)
  - Isaac Richards, Anglican bishop (born 1859)
- 11 May – Dick Mason, cricketer (born 1881)
- 19 May – Thomas William Kirk, biologist, scientific administrator (born 1856)
- 21 May – John Spencer, rugby union and rugby league player (born 1880)
- 26 May – James Bradney, politician, shipping proprietor (born 1853)
- 3 June – Cedric Carr, botanist (born 1892)
- 16 June – Alexander Cairns, cricketer (born 1850)
- 24 June – Sir Frederick Chapman, judge (born 1849)

=== July–September ===
- 8 July – Ernest Sutherland, field athlete (born 1894)
- 9 July – Frances Haselden, headmistress (born c. 1842)
- 30 July – Sir James Mills, businessman, politician (born 1847)
- 9 August – George Butler, artist (born 1872)
- 12 August – Oscar Michelsen, missionary (born 1844)
- 17 August – Francis Henry Smith, politician (born 1868)
- 12 September – Richard Moore, politician (born 1849)
- 17 September – Ettie Rout, campaigner for safe sex (born 1877)
- 18 September – Emily White, gardener, writer (born 1839)
- 27 September – Archibald Hawke, businessman, sports administrator, politician (born 1862)

=== October–December ===
- 7 October – Frank Hockly, politician
- 15 October – Allen Bell, politician (born 1870)
- 18 October – James Hay, cricketer (born 1885)
- 19 October – William Chapple, politician (born 1864)
- 5 November – Tahupōtiki Haddon, Methodist minister (born 1866)
- 9 November – Edward McCausland, rugby union player (born 1865)
- 13 November – Charles Miles (born 1850)
- 25 November – John MacGregor, politician (born c. 1850)
- 23 December – Alf Hadden, cricketer (born 1877)
- 27 December – William Morris, public servant (born 1853)
- 31 December – John Dumbell, rugby union player (born 1859)

== See also ==
- History of New Zealand
- List of years in New Zealand
- Military history of New Zealand
- Timeline of New Zealand history
- Timeline of New Zealand's links with Antarctica
- Timeline of the New Zealand environment
