= Duder =

Duder may refer to:

== People ==
- Albert Duder (1856–1936), New Zealand mariner and harbourmaster
- Charles Duder (1819–1879), Newfoundland merchant and politician
- Tessa Duder (born 1940), New Zealand author and former swimmer
- Thomas C. Duder (1850–1912), Newfoundland merchant and politician

== Fictional character ==
- "The Dude" or "The Duder", from the movie The Big Lebowski

== Places ==
- Duder, Iran, in Fars Province, Iran
- Duders Beach or Umupuia Beach, in Auckland, New Zealand
- Duder Regional Park, a park in Auckland, New Zealand
