= Robert Haddon =

Robert Haddon may refer to:

- Robert Joseph Haddon (1866–1929), England-born architect in Victoria, Australia
- Robert Tahupotiki Haddon (1866–1936), New Zealand Methodist minister
