= 1918 New Year Honours (MBE) =

This is a list of people appointed Member of the Order of the British Empire (MBE) in the 1918 New Year Honours.

The 1918 New Year Honours were appointments by King George V to various orders and honours to reward and highlight good works by citizens of the British Empire. The appointments were published in The London Gazette and The Times in January, February and March 1918.

Unlike the 1917 New Year Honours, the 1918 honours was dominated by rewards for war efforts. As The Times reported: "The New Year Honours represent largely the circumstances of war, and, perhaps, as usual, they also reflect human nature in an obvious form. The list is one of the rare opportunities for the public to scan the names of soldiers who have distinguished themselves in service."

The recipients of the Order of the British Empire were not classified as being within Military or Civilian divisions until following the war.

The recipients of honours are displayed here as they were styled before their new honour and arranged by division (Military, Civil, etc.) as appropriate.

== Member of the Order of the British Empire (MBE) ==
=== Military Division ===
- Capt. John Herbert Ashton, Superintending Ofc., Army Veterinary Corps
- Margaret Winifred Atkinson, Superintendent, Cookery Section, Women's Legion
- Capt. Albert Raymond Auger, Q.M., Base Depot, Canadian Forestry Corps
- Capt. William Edgar Aylwin, Royal Flying Corps
- Capt. John Baker, Royal Army Service Corps; Confidential Clerk to Assistant Director of Transport, War Office
- Lt.-Col. Harry Hyndman Balfour, RAMC; South African Hospital, Richmond Park
- Capt. Douglas Barnes, Commanding No. 2 Depot Battalion, Overseas Training Brigade, Australian Imperial Forces
- Lt. Harold Wilmot Barras, Royal Garrison Arty.; Assistant Inspector of Carriages, Ministry of Munitions
- Maj. Alexander Barron, Royal Army Service Corps
- Maj. David Ernest Bellaney, Remount Service
- Magrelinho (he used to enter in the war)
- Lt.-Col. William Joseph Bentley, Assistant Director of Dental Services, Canadian Forces
- Capt. John Augustus Blay, Q.M.-General's Dept., War Office
- Maj. Arthur Blennerhassett, Remount Service
- Capt. Lester Browning Booty, Inspector Auditor, Messing Accounts, War Office
- Capt. Ernest Bowles, South African Pay Office
- Capt. Henry Cecil Boys, Formerly Assistant Inspector of Gun Ammunition (Technical), Ministry of Munitions
- Capt. Frederick Henry Ewart Branson, Army Ordnance Dept.
- Capt. Edwin Brown, Assistant Inspector of Gun Ammunition (Technical), Ministry of Munitions
- Helen Grace Rae Brown, Administrator, Queen Mary's Army Auxiliary Corps
- Lt. Herbert Charles Stuart Bullock, Royal Flying Corps
- Maj. Charles Duncan Miles Campbell, Royal Flying Corps
- Lt.-Col. David Bishop Campbell, Forestry Technical Ofc., Canadian Forestry Corps
- Maj. Francis Henry Chalkley, Ordnance Ofc. in Charge of Salvage Depot
- Capt. Charles Joseph Charlton, Staff Capt., Canadian Headquarters
- Col. Sir John Maurice Clark Bt VD Midlothian Territorial Force Association, Ministry of National Service
- Lt.-Col. William James Clarke, Royal Field Arty., Assistant Inspector of Carriages, Ministry of Munitions
- Capt. Thomas Coates, Superintending Ofc. (Q.M.), General Headquarters, Home Forces
- Maj. William Coley, Royal Arty., Q.M., Depot, Argyll and Sutherland Highlanders
- Maj. Henry Cooper, Commissary of Ordnance, Woolwich
- Sylvia Corner, Q.M., Queen Mary's Army Auxiliary Corps
- Lt. Gordon George Crocker, Military Intelligence Branch, War Office
- Maj. Roy Victor Cutler MC Commanding Australian Engineers Training Depot
- Capt. R. J. Durley, in charge of Gauges and Drawings, Canada, Ministry of Munitions
- Hester Mary Edwards, Administrator, Woman's Army Auxiliary Corps
- Maj. William Farraday, Reserve Mechanical Transport Depot
- Capt. Alexander Fenton, in charge of Technical Warehouse, Canadian Forestry Corps
- Lt.-Col. Alpin Ferguson, Deputy Assistant Director of Timber Operations, Canadian Forestry Corps
- May Finlay, Superintendent, Cookery Section, Women's Legion
- Capt. Harold Fortescue Flannery, Late Proof Ofc., Canada, Ministry of Munitions
- Lt.-Col. John James Fry, Deputy Director of Transport, Canadian Forces
- Lt. William Henry Gregory Geake, Assistant at Munitions Inventions Dept., Experimental Ground
- Jane Margaret Francis Gibson, Superintendent, Cookery Section, Women's Legion
- Lt. Richard Jones, in charge of Materials, Mechanical Transport Depot, Kempton Park
- Lt. Herbert Alfred Joy, Royal Arty., Estimating Ofc., Coast Defence Armament
- Maj. Wybrants Judge, Q.M., Rifle Depot, Winchester
- Lt. John James Keene, Confidential Clerk, War Office
- Capt. Frederick Keough, Q.M., No. 4 Reserve Brigade, Royal Field Arty.
- Maj. Robert John Lapham, Army Service Corps
- Maj. Herbert Laurie, Remount Service
- Capt. James Lawrence, Royal Army Service Corps; Chief Clerk, Supplies Branch, War Office
- Maj. Clive Leese, Inspecting Ofc. to Mechanical Transport, Ministry of Munitions
- Maj. Edwin Philip Le Mesurier, Jersey Militia; Area Cmdr., White City, West London
- Capt. John Walter Litchfield, Assistant Inspector, Army Ordnance Depot, Woolwich
- Maj. Owen Lobley, Canadian Army Pay Corps
- Capt. Henry John Leicester Longden, Inspector of Army Schools
- Capt. Arthur Henry Lowe, in charge of Army Ordnance Depot, Aintree
- Capt. Dudley Owen Lumley, Wiltshire Reg.; Deputy Assistant Inspector of Recruiting, Southern Command
- Capt. Thomas Lyons, Deputy Assistant Director of Aircraft Equipment, Air Board
- Capt. William Charles McCutchan MC Adjutant, Australian Signal Training Depot
- Capt. Alexander McDonald, Assistant Inspector of Guns, Ministry of Munitions
- Maj. the Reverend John Howard MacDonald Canadian Headquarters Staff
- Lt. William Henry George Maton, Royal Arty., Ordnance Dept., War Office
- Lt. Thomas Matthews, Royal Garrison Arty.
- Lt.-Col. Henry George Mayes, Director, Canadian Army Gymnastic Staff
- Lt. Frederick George Middleton, Royal Engineers, Inspector, Royal Engineer Machinery, War Office
- Lt. James Edward Moberly, Assistant Engineer, Ministry of Munitions, No. 7 Area (Metropolitan)
- Capt. William Morgan, Royal Engineers, Q.M., Northern Command
- Lt. John William Mort
- Lt. Frederick Montague Augustus Morris, Assistant to Staff Capt., War Office
- Lt. James Thomas Morton Clarke, Q.M.-General's Dept., War Office
- Maj. George Alexander Stokes Nairn, Supervising Military Representative of No. 4 District; Assistant Inspector of Recruiting, Western Command
- Maj. John Arnold Neale, Australian Imperial Force, in charge of Australian Records
- Lt. Thomas Neame, Works Manager, Messrs. Stewarts & Lloyds, Ltd., Birmingham
- Capt. Richard Trevor Tudor Owen, Montgomeryshire Yeomanry; Assistant Inspector of Small Arms, Ministry of Munitions
- Capt. Percy Frank Parker, Royal Army Ordnance Corps; in charge of Clothing Dept., Leicester
- Maj. Sidney Ernest Parker, Instructor, Royal Flying Corps
- Lt. Robert Halstead Porters, Sec., British Military Mission at Russian Headquarters
- Capt. Frederick Charles Prime, Royal Arty., Assistant Inspector of High Explosives, Ministry of Munitions
- Capt. Percy Thorndon Remington, Dental Ofc., Australian Army Medical Corps
- Capt. William Hoyles Rennie, Volunteer Musketry Instructor, for services in connection with the Royal Newfoundland Reg.
- Lt. William Rush, in charge of Stores, No. 2 Reserve Transport Depot, Blackheath
- Capt. Percy Rust, London Reg., Artists Rifles Ofc.s Training Corps
- Maj. William John Ryan, Royal Flying Corps
- Capt. Henry Sadler, Royal Army Service Corps; Riding Master, Buller Barracks, Aldershot
- Maj. Thomas Lewis Lindsay Sandes, South African Hospital, Richard Park
- Capt. Walter Richard Shilstone, in charge of Canadian and American Inspection Section, Ministry of Munitions
- Capt. Sidney James Smith, Royal Army Service Corps; Chief Clerk, Aldershot Command
- Brevet Col. Stanley George Drew Smith, Assistant Inspector of Carriages, Ministry of Munitions
- Lt. Charles Henry Hughes Spivey, Acting Q.M. and Superintending Clerk of Reserve Battalion, Scots Guards
- Lt. Leslie Norman Waldegrave Stone, Royal Garrison Arty.; Assistant Inspector of Carriages, Ministry of Munitions
- Capt. Arthur Fraser Sutton, Senior Dental Ofc., Australian Army Medical Corps
- Capt. Walter Benjamin Thorpe, Royal Army Service Corps; Chief Superintending Clerk, Northern Command
- Capt. Edwin George Thomas Tims, School of Instruction for N.C.O.s, Salisbury
- Maj. Walter Henry Tofft, Australian Army Medical Corps
- Maj. William Walker, Royal Army Ordnance Dept.
- Beatrice Gascoigne Ward, Deputy Commandant, Motor Section, Women's Legion
- Capt. William George West, Gun Contracts, Contracts Dept., Ministry of Munitions
- Lt. Percy Claydon Whitteridge, Royal Army Ordnance Corps
- Maj. Richard Charles Williamson, Recruiting Ofc., Greenock Sub-Area
- Capt. George Frederick William Willicot MC Staff Ofc., Royal Engineers
- Lt. Cecil Herbert Stanley Willis, Artists Rifles Ofc.s Training Corps
- Maj. Godfrey Harold Alfred Wilson, General Staff, War Office

For services in connection with the War in France, Egypt and Salonika —

- Lt. Andrew Buchan, Royal Engineers
- Gladys Mary Collins, Deputy Administrator, Queen Mary's Army Auxiliary Corps
- Capt. Francis Robertson Gladstone Duckworth, Sec., Claims Commission, British Salonika Force
- Lt. George Ingle Finch, Royal Army Ordnance Corps; Base Ordnance Depot, Salonika
- Mary Sophia Frood, Queen Mary's Army Auxiliary Corps, Area Controller, Abbeville
- Lilias Ida Gill, Unit Administrator, Queen Mary's Army Auxiliary Corps
- Gladys Alicia Jones, Assistant Administrator, Queen Mary's Army Auxiliary Corps
- Margaret Kilroy Kenyon, Queen Mary's Army Auxiliary Corps, Area Controller, Calais
- Maj. William F. Lench, lately Ofc. in charge of Egyptian Expeditionary Force Canteens
- Alice Low, Queen Mary's Army Auxiliary Corps, Area Controller, Boulogne
- Frances Mary Parker, Queen Mary's Army Auxiliary Corps, Area Controller, Havre
- Edith Mary Pridden, Queen Mary's Army Auxiliary Corps, Area Controller, Étaples

=== Civil Division ===
- Ethel May Abram, Commandant, St. Luke's Auxiliary Hospital, Reading
- Margaret Acland Hood, Organiser of Recreation Clubs, Munition Workers Welfare Committee, Y.W.C.A.
- Maud Florence Addington, Superintendent, Lady Clerical Staff, Ofc.s Casualty Branch, War Office
- William James Addiscott, Assistant Collector of Fishery Statistics at Plymouth
- Florence Bessie Affleck, Assistant Organiser and Administrator, High Wycombe Auxiliary Hospital
- Andrew Aikman, Sec. and Engineering Manager, South-Eastern Midlands Munitions Board of Management
- William Aitkenhead, Shop Manager, Messrs. G. & J. Weir, Ltd.
- Ernest Charles Aldridge, Travelling Inspector, Central Stores Dept., Ministry of Munitions
- Samuel Kendrick Aldridge, Assistant, Director of Finance, Ministry of Food
- Stroma Alexander-Sinclair
- Charles Hugh Alison, Acting Paymaster, Army Pay Dept.
- George Macdonald Allan, Naval Sea Transport Branch, Ministry of Shipping
- Ida Allan, Commandant, Hornbrook Auxiliary Hospital, Chislehurst
- Thomas Easton Allan, Messrs. Robey & Company, Ltd.
- Thomas Cuthbert Allchin, E.G. Powder Company, Ltd.
- William Barnes Alloock, Superintendent, Perivale National Filling Factory, Ministry of Munitions
- Alan Bruce Allen, Inspector of Furs and Skins, War Office
- Frank Allen, Chief Special Constable, Doncaster
- Alfred Amos JP Chairman of the Kent Farmers Club
- Capt. Henry Leonard Herbert Andrews, Ministry of National Service
- Malcolm Percival Applebey, Acids Supply Branch of Explosives Supply Dept., Ministry of Munitions
- Lt. Alfred Henry Arnold, Sec. to Mediterranean Commission, British Red Cross and Order of St. John of Jerusalem
- Florence Evelyn Arnott, Commandant in Charge, St. Michael's Auxiliary Hospital, Brampton, Cumberland
- Olive Inana Arthur, Vice-Convenor and General Manager, Red Cross Comforts Depot, Ayr
- Lt. Robert William Ascroft, Head of Spraying Organisation, Food Production Dept.
- Harry Hales Ashbridge, Works Manager, Churchill Machine Tool Company Limited, Manchester
- Ernest Gilman Ashley, Commercial Steel Section, Iron and Steel Dept., Ministry of Munitions
- Wilfred Adam Ashworth, Technical Assistant, Machine Tool Dept., Ministry of Munitions
- Carleton Richard Bucky Atkinson, Assistant in Levant Consular Service
- Sydney Watson Attwell, Assistant, National Phvsical Laboratory
- Frances Victoria Aur, Sec., Convalescent Homes for Ofc.s Committee, British Red Cross Society
- Stanley Back, Royal Navy, Ordnance Store Depot, Portsmouth
- Eustace Vivian Bacon, Assistant, Secretariat, Ministry of Munitions
- Francis Baker, Great Western Railway
- Percy Montagu Baker, Technical Adviser, Training Section, Labour Supply Dept., Ministry of Munitions
- Thomas Edgar Baker, Assistant, Establishment Dept., Ministry of Munitions
- William Ernest Baker, Projectile Company, Ltd.
- Joseph Alfred William Ballard, Torpedo Store Dept., Admiralty
- Victoria Vera Bannatyne, Sec. to the Devon and Cornwall War Refugees Committee
- Alexander Bannerman, Head of the Clerical Staff, War Trade Intelligence Dept.
- Frances Amy Barber, Ofc. in Charge, Red Cross Hub, 54 General Hospital, France
- Samuel Henry Barber, Chief Ofc., Northampton Special Constabulary
- William Clarence Barber, Establishment Branch, Trench Warfare Supply Dept., Ministry of Munitions
- Thomas Barker, Chairman, Branston Rural Local Tribunal
- Maj. Alfred George Barrett, Royal Engineers, Staff Clerk, Contracts Branch, H.M. Office of Works
- Herbert Harry Baron, Non-technical Assistant, Machine Tool Dept., Ministry of Munitions
- Kenneth Delmar Barrett, Outside Manager, Messrs. Hawthorn, Leslie & Company
- William James Barrett, Inspector of Woodwork, Woolwich Dockyard
- Lt.-Cmdr. Thomas Barwell Barrington RNVR Design Section, Air Board, Technical Dept.
- Jonathan Barron, Fishery Ofc. of the Cornwall Local Sea Fisheries Committee
- Olive Bartels, Lady Clerk, War Office
- Harriet Barton, Commandant and Superintendent, Auxiliary Hospital, Budleigh Salterton
- William Bate, National Explosives Company
- Helen Maud Bax-Ironside, Munition Workers Welfare Committee (Y.W.C.A.) Organiser in Lancaster
- Fane Fleming Baxter, War Refugees Committee
- Bertha Marguerite Bayne, Chief Woman Inspector, Food Production Dept.
- John William Bearder Headmaster, Northallerton Grammar School; Honorary Sec. of Yorkshire North Riding Local Representative Committee, and of Belgian Refugee Committee
- Edith Maude Beaver, Assistant Inspector, National Health Insurance Commission (England)
- Herbert Bowman Beddall, Food Production Sub-Comm. for Cornwall
- Reginald Bedding ton, Divisional Cmdr., Metropolitan Special Constabulary
- James Stuart Beddoe, Dept. of Director of Dockyards and Repairs, Admiralty
- Richard William Bedford, Messrs. G. Ken Ltd.
- Evelyn Belcher, Q.M., Auxiliary Hospital, Chippenham, Wiltshire
- Violet Caroline Bell, Voluntary Aid Detachment, New Zealand Expeditionary Force
- Gwendolen Edith Bellasis, Higher Grade Woman Clerk in the War Trade Dept.
- Ernest Lampeer Bennett, Sec. in Charge, Yorkshire Division, Y.M.C.A.
- Lt. John Baldwin Beresford, Sec. of the Professional Classes Committee of the Government Committee for the Prevention and Relief of Distress
- Alice Eleanor Bernard, Contraband Dept., Foreign Office
- Stanley Howard Bersey, Explosives Factory Finance, Finance Dept., Ministry of Munitions
- F. H. Bevan, Technical Services Branch, Ministry of Shipping
- Lois Biddle, Contraband Dept., Foreign Office
- William Henry Bignold, Collector of Customs and Excise, Leith
- Thomas Edson Birbeck, Senior Bond Ofc., Manchester, Ministry Of Munitions
- Bertha Birch
- Tom Birkett, Food Production Sub-Comm. for Cumberland and Westmorland
- Capt. Percy Bishop, Assistant Engineer engaged on Design of Aeroplanes at Royal Aircraft Factory
- Mancra Winifred Black, Private Sec. to Acting Chief of British War Mission in U.S.A.
- Frances Charlotte Isabella Blackett, Honorary Sec. for Perthshire, Scottish Branch, British Red Cross Society
- Malcolm Blair, Manager, Messrs. Head, Wrightson & Company
- Jack Percy Blake, Head of Priority Section, Explosives Supply Dept., Ministry of Munitions
- Thomas Blarney JP Bailie of Cowdenbeath
- Nesta Blennerhassett, Lord Dunraven's Hospital Ship Grainaig
- John William Arundel Bonner, Chairman of Southwell Rural Tribunal
- Harold Arthur Box, Second in Charge, Motor Ambulance Dept., Headquarters Staff, British Red Cross Society
- Lota Boycott, Commandant, Bricket House Auxiliary Hospital, St. Albans
- Elizabeth Frances Boyd, Ministry of National Service
- Albert Edward Boyer MRCVS Conducting Ofc., Horse Transport Duty
- William Embrey Bradbury, London and North Western Railway
- Henry Edward Manning Bradley, Staff Clerk, Supplies Division, H.M. Office of Works
- Lt. The Hon. Oliver Sylvian Brett, Military Intelligence Branch, War Office
- Edith Marian Brightman, Commandant, Fairneld Auxiliary Hospital, Broadstairs
- Col. Arthur Rudston Brown, Deputy Director of Recruiting, Birmingham Area
- Charles Frederick Brown, Military Sea Transport Branch, Ministry of Shipping
- Fannie Florence Brown, Vice-President, Heaton Chapel Division, British Red Cross and Order of St. John of Jerusalem
- George Drake Brown
- Tomyns Reginald Browne VD Inspector of Gun Ammunition (Supervisory), Ministry of Munitions
- Bertha Marguerita Bruce, Inspection Welfare Superintendent, Ministry of Munitions, Birmingham
- Maye Bruce, Commandant, Norton Hall Auxiliary Hospital, Campden, Gloucestershire
- John Locktom Bryan, Superintendent of Registry, Food Production Dept.
- Herbert William Bryant, Sec. in Charge, North Midland Division, Y.M.C.A.
- Frederick Francis Smith Bryson, Sub-Section Director, Optical Munitions and Glass Dept., Ministry of Munitions
- James Buckman, Chairman, Bermondsey Advisory Committee, Ministry of National Service
- Alfred Adolphus Bumpus JP Ex-Chairman of Loughborough Local Tribunal
- Richard Edward Bumstead JP Member of East Kent Appeal Tribunal
- Samuel Bunton JP Technical Ofc. to Shipyard Labour Dept., Admiralty
- Lt. Albert Edmund Burden, Stores Manager, Alexandria and Canal Zone, British Red Cross and Order of St. John
- Arthur William Burgess, in charge of Aeronautical Supply Dept. Registry, Air Board
- Elspeth Burgess, Chief Q.M., Newbury Auxiliary Hospital, Victoria Park, Manchester
- John Laurence Burleigh, Chairman, Colchester Advisory Committee
- George Alfred Burling, Private Sec. to Assistant Sec., Establishment Dept., Ministry of Munitions
- Regiaulde de Maule Burn-Murdoch, Assistant County Director for City of Edinburgh, Scottish Branch, British Red Cross Society
- Helen Jaqueline Burns, Scottish Organiser, Munition Workers Welfare Committee, Y.W.C.A.
- Hedley Gravett Burrough, Sec. in Charge, South Eastern Division, Y.M.C.A.
- Leopold Arthur Burrow, Chief Draughtsman to Chief Mechanical Engineer, War Office
- Kate Ellen Burrows, Commandant, Voluntary Aid Detachment No. 22, Arnott Hill Auxiliary Hospital, Day brook, Nottinghamshire
- John Burt JP Member of Appeal Tribunal, Dunfermline
- Ethel Cadogan Burton Ballantine, Lady Superintendent, Army Pay Dept.
- Isabel Burton-Mackenzie, Welfare Supervisor, Ministry of Munitions, National Projectile Factory, Cardonald, Glasgow
- John Edwin Bury, Assistant Director of Finance, Royal Commission on Wheat Supplies
- Clement Guy Caines, Accountant-General's Dept., Admiralty
- John Cairns JP Northumberland Miners Association; Member of Colliery Recruiting Court, Northumberland and North Durham
- Norman Restell Cameron, Acting Shipyard Manager, Messrs. Thornycroft and Company
- Clementina Henrietta Campbell, Trade Division, of the Naval Staff, Admiralty
- Maj. Colin Clyde Campbell, Australian Imperial Force
- Gilbert Campbell, Outside Manager, Wallsend Slipway and Engineering Company
- Harry Campbell, Transport Superintendent o the War Refugees Committee
- James Alexander West Campbell, Acting Accountant in the War Office
- Capt. Thomas Epton Campey, Army Veterinary Stores Dept.
- Henry Candler, Acting Staff Clerk, War Office
- William Carnegie, Messrs. Cammell Laird & Company, Ltd.
- Thomas William Carroll, Constructive Dept., H.M. Dockyard, Portsmouth
- Francis Tavor Carter, Sec., London Central Association, Y.M.C.A.
- William Carter, Clerk to the Horwich Urban District Council
- Albert Wing Carver, Clerk to the Cannock Rural Local Tribunal
- Francis Richard Cassidi Ofc. in Charge, Transport of First Line Hospitals, Derbyshire
- The Hon. Alicia Margaret Cecil, Assistant Director of Horticultural Organisation, Food Production Dept.
- Thomas Chadwick, Minor Staff Clerk, Treasury
- Alfred Philip Chalkley, Chief Engineer, Motor Boat Service, Mesopotamia, British Red Cross Society
- Bromley Challenor, Clerk to the Guardians, Abingdon
- William Robert Challinor, Inspector, Wigan Special Constabulary
- Margaret Chalmers, Administrative Assistant, Materials and Accessories Branch, Air Board
- Harry Chambers, Chief Assistant, Seeds Section, Food Production Dept.
- Guy Mortimer Chantrey, Trench Warfare Finance, Finance Dept., Ministry of Munitions
- Harry Cheesman, Chairman of Advisory Committee, Lewisham
- Mary Alden Childers, Sec. of the Chelsea War Refugees Committee
- Elizabeth Chinery, Commandant, Home Mead Auxiliary Hospital, Lymington
- Owen Aly Clark JP Chief Ofc., Special Constabulary, Bury St. Edmunds
- Walter Leonard Clarke, Messrs. Benham & Sons, Ltd.
- Edith Clarke, Teacher of Domestic Subjects, National Training School of Cookery
- Thomas Henry Clarke, Mechanical Transport, Contracts Dept., Ministry of Munitions
- Charles Henry James Clayton, Chief Drainage Inspector, Food Production Dept.
- Margaret Penelope Clegg, Commandant of Holden House Auxiliary Hospital, Boston, Lincolnshire
- Edith Emily Clowes, Honorary Sec., County of Herefordshire, British Red Cross and Order of St. John of Jerusalem
- Alfred William Ayers-Cluett, Royal Corps of Naval Constructors
- Ernest Frederick Coast, Royal Corps of Naval Constructors
- Robert Bennett Cobb, First Class Clerk, Ministry of Pensions
- Lady Gertrude Cochrane, President of the Fifeshire Branch, Scottish Branch, British Red Cross Society
- Edward Cock, Royal Corps of Naval Constructors
- Douglas Bennett Cockerell, Stores Accounting Ofc., Ministry of Munitions
- Frank William Coffey, Sec. in Charge, Midland Division, Y.M.C.A.
- Edward George Cole JP Chairman of the Edmonton Military Hospital Committee
- Harold William Cole, Chief Clerk, Petrol Dept., Board of Trade
- Capt. Francis William Colledge, Honorary Sec. and Acting County Director, Renfrewshire, Scottish Branch, British Red Cross Society
- Lionel Dennis Collins, Collector of Fishery Statistics in North Shields
- Beatrice Annie Collinson, Commandant in Charge, Auxiliary Hospital, Stramongate, Westmorland
- Walter William Coltman JP Chief Ofc., Loughborough Special Constabulary
- Charles Leonard Compton, Senior Staff Clerk in the Registry-General of Shipping and Seamen
- Geraldine Emily Coningham, Oakhurst Auxiliary Hospital, Erith
- Jessie Murdoch Connell, Commandant of Myrtle Auxiliary Hospital, Myrtle Street, Liverpool
- James Conner, Messrs. Dick Kerr, Ltd.
- Fred Compigne Cook, Chief Aliens Ofc., Port of London
- Richard Frederic Cook, Section Director, Railway Materials Branch, Ministry of Munitions
- Cuthbert Cresswell Cooke, Projectile Contracts, Contracts Dept., Ministry of Munitions
- Henry James Cooksey, Class A Clerk, War Office
- Arthur Henry Coombe, Accountant-General's Dept., Admiralty
- William Walter Coombs, Staff Clerk, Companies Dept., Board of Trade
- Bertram George Cooper, Head of Sub-section of Air Board Technical Dept.
- Lt. H. M. Cooper, Assistant Inspector of Munitions, Canada
- James Cooper, Class A Clerk, War Office
- John Cooper, President of the North Staffordshire Miners Association; Assessor to the Colliery Recruiting Court
- Clarence George Copus, Head of the Oiler Section, Ministry of Shipping
- Maj. Edward Richard Trevor Corbett, District Recruiting Ofc., No. 4 District
- Hilda Eliza Agar Cordeaux, Commandant, Auxiliary Hospital, Louth, Lincolnshire
- John Corrigan, Member of Appeal Tribunal, Ayr
- Howard Denys Russell Cowan, British Vice-Consul, Havana
- William Cowan, Works Manager, Messrs. Palmer's Jarrow Shipyard
- Randolph Lewis Coward, First Class Assistant Accountant in the War Office
- Juliet Sisley Craig, Commandant of the Hillingdon Auxiliary Hospital, Hayes End, Middlesex
- James Crawley, Stores Dept., Headquarters Staff, British Red Cross Society
- Edward Patrick Creegan, Superintendent of the Drawing Dept. of the Ordnance Survey of the United Kingdom
- Gerald Faulkner Cripps, Sec. of the Committee for Providing Hostels for Disabled Men under Training
- Helena Jane Crisp, Voluntary Aid Detachment Dept., British Red Cross Society
- Herbert Lawson Critchley, Sub-Section Director in Charge, Efficiency Section, Gun Ammunition Manufacture, Ministry of Munitions
- William Gordon Crockett, Junior Clerk, Stores Dept., India Office
- George Scott Cromar, Sr., Outside Manager of Messrs. D. & W. Henderson & Company
- Winifred Eyre Crompton-Roberts, Honorary Sec., Auxiliary Hospital, Monmouth
- Ann Ellen Cropper, Commandant, Auxiliary Hospital, Portskewitt, Monmouthshire
- Ernest Cross, Staff Ofc., Rotherham Special Constabulary
- Robert Cross, Station Master, Midland Railway, Tilbury
- William Cuickshank, Assistant Inspector of Carriages, Ministry of Munitions
- Janet Baron Cumming, Organising Sec. in Scotland, Munition Workers Welfare Committee, Y.W.C.A.
- Margaret Georgiana Cuninghame, Honorary Sec. and Superintendent of Ayrshire Surgical Work Depot
- Marghuerita Copeland Currie, Canteen Inspector, Munition Workers Welfare Committee, Y.W.C.A.
- George Charles Cusens, Torpedo Store Dept., Admiralty
- John Cuthberfeson, Ernest Edward Cutler, Messrs. Cutler & Sons
- James Daglish, Outside Manager of North-Eastern Marine Engineering Company, Ltd.
- Ellen Frances Darlow, Commandant of Auxiliary Hospital, Presbyterian Hall, Northwood, Middlesex
- William Elliot Darrach, Technical Services Branch, Ministry of Shipping
- Grace Emilie Davey, in charge of Women Staff, Labour Dept., Ministry of Munitions
- George Frederick Davidson, Personal Assistant to Council Member G, Ministry of Munitions
- Sophia Katherine Davies, Welfare Supervisor, Ministry of Munitions, National Projectile Factory, Templeboro
- Alfred Thomas Davies, Assistant, Priority Dept., Ministry of Munitions
- Arthur Vernon Davies Assistant County Director Representing; the Order of St. John of Jerusalem, East Lancashire
- Gwilym Meirion Davies, Sec., Ministry of Munitions District Office, No. 2 Area (North-West England)
- Hugh Christopher Davies, Sec., Norfolk War Agricultural Executive Committee
- Walter Davies, Sec. to the Local Representative Committee for Baling
- Thomas Daw, Assistant Director of Recruiting, Central London Area
- Horace Christian Dawkins, Divisional Cmdr., Metropolitan Special Constabulary
- George William Dawson, Private Sec. to Acting Member of Council A, Ministry of Munitions
- Beatrice Mary Dawson-Thomas, Commandant, Auxiliary Hospital, Old Baux Buildings, Minehead
- George Day, Naval Store Dept., Admiralty
- Edgar Reginald Deacon, Research Dept., Woolwich Arsenal
- Frederic William Charles Dean, Manager, Gun and Carriage Factories, Woolwich Arsenal
- Seth Ellis Dean, Chairman, Sleaford Rural Tribunal
- Phyllis Lucy Deane, Commandant, Sandy Auxiliary Hospital; Bedford
- Albert Deighton, Chief Engineer and Works Manager, Messrs. Steel, Peech, and Tozer, Ltd.
- Adam Fairrie Denniston, Supervisor for the Eastern District of Scotland Red Cross Depot
- Hubert Augustus Dent, In charge of Issue of Drafts, Finance Dept., Ministry of Munitions
- Lady Lilian Mary Harriet Diana Digby, Commandant, Voluntary Aid Detachment No. 94; Donor, Holnest Auxiliary Hospital, Sherborne
- Charles William Dixon, Second Class Clerk, Colonial Office; Private Sec. to the Permanent UnderSec. of State
- Annie Emilia Scott Elliott Doig, Lady Superintendent, All Welcome Y.M.C.A. Hut, Victoria
- William Donald, Assistant Manager for Submarines, Messrs. Vickers, Ltd.
- William John Dorrell, Assistant to Head of Shipping Intelligence Section, Ministry of Shipping
- Aileen Margaret Dougherty, Foreign Claims Office
- Allie Vibert Douglas, Statistical Dept., Ministry of National Service
- Percy Bissett Down, Assistant Inspector of Guns, Ministry of Munitions
- John Drake, Assistant Superintendent of Registry, Treasury
- Sidney William Drinkwater, Second Division Clerk, Home Office
- Edith Marion Drummond Smith, Organiser of Munition Workers Hute, Munition Workers Welfare Committee, Y.W.C.A.
- Duncan Drysdale, Finance Branch, Ministry of Shipping
- Bernard Phineas Dudding, Assistant, National Physical Laboratory
- Reginald Franklin Hare Duke, General Sec. to the Commission Internationale de Ravitaillement, Board of Trade
- Frank Hay Dunbar, Head of the Registry of the Restriction of Enemy Supplies Dept.
- James Dunley, Member of Appeal Tribunal, Alloa
- Frederick George Dunlop, Outside Manager of Messrs. Harland & Wolff's Belfast Works
- William Louis Martial Dunlop, Staff Clerk, Foreign Office
- Mabel Alethea Dupe, Lady Superintendent, Y.M.C.A. Shakespeare Hut, Gower Street
- Frederick Harold Dupre FCS Official Chemical Adviser on Explosives to the Home Office and Ministry of Munitions
- William Duran JP Honorary Sheriff Substitute of Caithness, Orkney, and Shetland; Member of Appeal Tribunal, Caithness
- Beatrice Aimee Dutton, Commandant, Auxiliary Hospital, Windlesham Moor, Windlesham, Surrey
- Harold George Eadie, Sec., Ministry of Munitions District Office, No. 4 Area (Midlands)
- Edward Herbert Eagar, Senior Examiner, Pay Office
- Herbert Eborall, Accountant-General's Dept., Admiralty
- Stuart Strickland Moore Ede, Sub-section Director, Raw Materials Branch, Ministry of Munitions
- John Francis Edmonds, Superintendent, London Telephone Service
- Edith Constance Edwards, Commandant, Voluntary Aid Detachment No. 272, County of London; Organiser of Flag Day Collections in Marylebone
- Edward Tregaskiss Elbourne, Shop Superintendent, Ponders End Shell Works, Ponders End, Middlesex
- Archibald Sefton Elford, Ministry of Shipping
- Mabel Beatrice Elliott, Assistant Censor, War Office
- William Elliott, Outside Shipyard Manager of Messrs. J. L. Thompson & Sons
- Amy Amelia Ellis, Commandant, St. Aidan's Auxiliary Hospital, Cleethorpes
- Frank Ellison, Messrs. Hadfields, Ltd.
- Horace Milton Emery, Technical Adviser, Mechanical Cultivation Division, Food Production Dept.
- George Ernest Emmett, Acting Paymaster, Army Pay Dept.
- Frederick George Eshelby, Head of Military Traffic Dept., North-Eastern Railway
- George Gall Esslemont, Executive Officoer for Food Production, County of Aberdeen; Organiser of Egg Collection in the North Eastern District, Scottish Branch, British Red Cross Society
- Harriet Estill, Lady Superintendent and Hon. Sec., Highfield Auxiliary Hospital, Malton, Yorkshire
- Christopher Douglas Evans, Superintendent, Remount Depot, Ballsbridge
- Edward Percy Everest, Clerk to the Atcham Rural District Council
- James Alfred Fage, Dept. of Director of Dockyards and Repairs
- Robert Faikney, Dept.al Manager of the Dock Dept., Fanfield Shipbuilding and Engineering Company
- Marie-Antoinette Fairholme, Commandant, Auxiliary Hospital, Hathersage, Derbyshire
- James Falconer
- Samuel Maddams Fane, Staff Clerk, Supplies Division, H.M. Office of Works
- Edwin Wood Thorp Farley JP Mayor of Dover; Chairman of the Dover Local Tribunal
- Alexander Farquharson, Assistant in Local Authorities Division, Ministry of Food
- Capt. William Scott Farren, in charge of Aero-Dynamics at Royal Aircraft Factory
- Edith M. Feast, Honorary Sec. to Kobe British Ladies Patriotic League
- Katherine Fedden, Chairman, Belgravia War Hospital Supply Depot
- Alfred Ernest Fellowes, Forwarding Agent, Ministry of Munitions, Liverpool
- Charles Ernest Fenton, Staff Ofc., Post Office Stores Dept.
- Harriet Frances Fenwick, Lady Superintendent, Army Pay Dept.
- Florence Fetherstonhaugh, Vice-President and Organiser, Hazelwood Auxiliary Hospital, Ryde, Isle of Wight
- Elizabeth Susan Findlay, Superintendent of Women Munition Workers Canteen, Crayford
- Georgina Julia Findlay-Hamilton
- David John Finlayson, Chief Accountant, Headquarters Staff, British Red Cross Society
- Benjamin Kingston Finnimore, Assistant County Director, Dorsetshire, and Hon. Sec. for Sherborne Division, British Red Cross Society
- Clare Jane Firth, Matron, Withington Military Hospital
- Honoria Mary Fisher, Commandant, Waltham Town Hall Auxiliary Hospital, Waltham Abbey
- Henry Fitzmaurice, First Class Assistant in Siam Consular Service
- Basil Fletcher, Acting Professional Clerk, Dept. of the Director of Public Prosecutions
- Watson Foggo, Manager, Cartridge Filling Factory, Aintree, Ministry of Munitions
- Robert Charles Follett, Adjutant, Hull Special Constabulary
- Mary Constance Forbes, Honorary Sec. of Red Cross Work Parties in the City of Edinburgh
- John Ford, Works Manager, Parsons Marine Steam Turbine Company
- William Robinson Lidderdale Forrest, Senior Bond Ofc., Birmingham, Ministry of Munitions
- Andrew Forster, Works Manager, Engine Side, Messrs. J. S. White & Company
- John Forster JP Ex-Mayor of St. Helens; Chairman of St. Helens Local Tribunal
- Frederick Walter Fossey, Senior Bond Ofc., Newcastle, Ministry of Munitions
- Henry Knollys Foster, Sec. and Executive Ofc., Herefordshire War Agricultural Executive Committee
- William Melville Foster, in charge, Censored Cables, Ministry of Munitions
- Edward Turner Fowell, Explosives Contracts Finance, Finance Dept., Ministry of Munitions
- Helene Fowle, President of the Committee for Dealing with the Interests of Belgians in Ireland
- Eveline Georgina Fowler, Founder and Manager of the Gunton Cottage Hospital for Naval Cases, Lowestoft
- John Jacob Fox FIC First Class Analyst, Government Laboratory
- Evelyn Margaret Fraser
- Thomas Houston Fraser, Contractors Claims for Increased Prices, Contracts Dept., Ministry of Munitions
- Edward James Frewen, Section Director, Railway Materials Branch, Ministry of Munitions
- Elizabeth Rowley Frisby, Y.M.C.A. Worker
- William Percy Froud, Superintendent to the Joint Railway Lines, Portsmouth
- Dorothy Margaret Fry, Private Sec. to Director-General of Munitions Supply, Ministry of Munitions
- Walter Everard Fuller, Superintendent, Contraband Dept. Registry
- Mary Edith Galilee, Superintendent of Women Munition, Workers Canteen, Hayes
- Christian McDowall Gall, Private Sec. to Additional Member of Council R., Ministry of Munitions
- John Dunn Gamble, British and Foreign Sailors Society, Derry
- Henry John Edward Garcia, Inspector of Taxes, Inland Revenue
- Albert Gard, Clerk to the Guardians, Devonport; Sec. to the Plymouth Prince of Wales Fund Committee
- Nora Hilton Gardner, Q.M., Hoole Bank Auxiliary Hospital, Cheshire
- Caroline Sugden Garnett, Commandant, Fairhope Auxiliary Hospital, Pendleton, Manchester
- Helen Maude Dorothy Garnett, Organiser of Women Munition Workers, Canteens and Clubs, Y.W.C.A.
- Constance Elizabeth Garside, Superintendent of Women Munition Workers Canteen and Social Work, Dursley
- Reginald Genower, Assistant in Statistical Branch, Ministry of Food
- William Geoghegan, County Director, City of Dublin, British Red Cross and Order of St. John of Jerusalem
- Allan Gibb, Rifle and Machine Gun Contracts, Contracts Dept., Ministry of Munitions
- Herbert Mends Gibson, Chairman of Transport Committee, East Lancashire, British Red Cross Society
- William Howieson Gibson, Research Dept., Woolwich Arsenal
- William Charles Ernest Gibson, Divisional Cmdr., Metropolitan Special Constabulary
- Thomas Arthur Walter Giffard, Military Intelligence Branch, War Office
- George Julian Gilbert, Staff Clerk, Civil Liabilities Committee
- Violet Adeline Gilbert, Personal Clerk to the President of the Board of Agriculture
- Robert Giles, Assistant Yard Manager, Messrs. Sir W. G. Armstrong, Whitworth & Company, Ltd.
- James Searle Gillingham, Royal Corps of Naval Constructors
- Maud Glennie, Late Private Sec. to Assistant Financial Sec., Ministry of Munitions
- Patrick Gordon Glennie, Ministry of Shipping
- James William Sleigh Godding JP Chairman, Plymouth Advisory Committee
- Albert Hamilton Godfrey, Chairman, Woking Local Tribunal
- Fanny Augusta Going, Lady Superintendent, Auxiliary Hospital, Littlehampton
- Edward Goldsmith, Divisional Cmdr., Metropolitan Special Constabulary
- Alfred Gollin, Divisional Cmdr., Metropolitan Special Constabulary
- Herbert Gooch, Confidential Clerk to Q.M. General, War Office
- Stanley Vernon Goodall, Royal Corps of Naval Constructors
- Alwyn Valerie Goodchild, Voluntary Aid Detachment, New Zealand Expeditionary Force
- Joshua Goodland, Assistant, Classification Section, Priority Dept., Ministry of Munitions
- Walter Goodwin, Assistant (Hospitals) Architect, War Office
- Helen Goodyear, Administrative Assistant, Contracts Branch, Air Board
- Percy Goodyear, Royal Corps of Naval Constructors
- George Gordon, Expense Accounts Dept., H.M. Dockyard, Devonport
- Robert Gordon, Mobilization Division, Admiralty Naval Staff
- Lily Gordon-Steward, Commandant, Voluntary Aid Detachment No. 26, St. John's Hospital, Weymouth
- Capt. Gorman Gorman
- Sandford George Gorton, Assistant Cable Engineer, General Post Office
- John Henry Gorvin, Assistant Sec., Royal Commission on Wheat Supplies
- John Benjamin Gotts, Superintendent of Manchester Branch, H.M. Stationery Office
- Claude William Shepard Gould, Assistant Commandant, Auxiliary Hospital, Barnstaple
- Robert Vaughan Gower, Mayor of Tunbridge Wells
- Christopher Colborne Graham, Mayor of Scarborough; Chairman of Local Tribunal
- Lt. Cuthbert Graham, Royal Engineers, Trench Warfare Research Dept., Ministry of Munitions
- David Morgan Graham JP
- Lt.-Col. William Grant, American Remount Commission
- Reginald Coupland Graves, Clerk to the Tottenham Urban District Council; Clerk to the Local Tribunal and Local Representative Committee
- Charles Harold Gray, Acting Paymaster, Army Pay Dept.
- William Gray, British Vice-Consul at Oruro, Bolivia
- Constance Mary Greaves, Donor and Matron, Wern Auxiliary Hospital, Portmadoc
- Alexander John Green, Sec.-in-Charge, London Division, Y.M.C.A.
- Hettie Mary Green, Honorary Sec., General Service Section, and Organiser, Nottinghamshire, British Red Cross and Order of St. John of Jerusalem
- Edith Mary Greenfield, Superintendent of Women Munition Workers Club, Newcastle
- Capt. Cecil Anstey Greet, Instructor in Catering, War Office
- Alvero Church Gregson, In Charge of Checking Dept., American Branch, Ministry of Munitions
- Capt. Robert Holmes Arbuthnot Gresson, Adjutant, Remount Service
- Charles William Grey, Surveyor (temporary), War Office
- James Dyce Grieve, Staff Clerk, Board of Agriculture for Scotland
- The Reverend Ellis Hughes Griffith, Chairman of Aethewy (Anglesey) Local Tribunal
- Helen Maud Griffiths
- James Thomas Grimbly, Senior Clerk, Recruiting Dept., Ministry of National Service
- Henry Grimsdall, Transport Ofc., Middlesex, British Red Cross and Order of St. John of Jerusalem
- Ellen Maud Grimsley, Sec. to the County Director, British Red Cross and Order of St. John of Jerusalem, Leicestershire
- John Gritton, Staff Clerk, Foreign Office
- Susannah Groom, Commandant of Allan House Auxiliary Hospital, Boston, Lincolnshire
- Professor Percy Groom Head of Section of Technical Dept. of Air Board
- Maj. John James Grubb, Q.M. General's Dept., War Office
- Allan Wilson Grundy, Naval Store Dept., H.M. Dockyard, Portsmouth
- Charles John Tench Bedford Grylls, Committee Clerk, Customs and Excise
- Matilda Ida Gubbins, Organiser and Commandant, High Wycombe Auxiliary Hospital
- Capt. Philip Edward Gummer, Royal Engineers, Staff Ofc., Royal Engineers, Irish Command
- Olive Francis Guthrie-Smith, Head Masseuse, Almeric Paget Military Massage Corps
- Frederick Weston Hadden, Private Sec. to the Financial Sec. of the Admiralty
- William Hadnutt, Instructional Manager, Training Section; Labour Supply Dept., Ministry of Munitions
- Bernard Parker Haigh Instructor in Applied Mechanics, Royal Naval College, Greenwich
- Harry Francis Hall, Technical Assistant, First Class, H.M. Office of Works
- John Hall JP
- John William Halloran, Town Clerk, Chatham; Clerk to the Chatham Local Tribunal
- Emily Moore Hamilton, Controller of Welfare and Chief Superintendent of Girl Messengers, War Office
- William Cecil Hammond, Divisional Cmdr., Metropolitan Special Constabulary
- George Hankinson, Clerk to the Guardians, Bridlington; Clerk to the Local Representative Committee
- Maj. Arthur Leonard Hanna, Inspecting Ofc.-to Mechanical Transport, Ministry of Munitions1
- Clarence Oldham Hanson, Assistant Deputy Surveyor, Forest of Dean
- Second Lt. Peter Kydd Hanton, Royal Engineers, Assistant Architect, 2nd Class, H.M. Office of Works
- James Hardman, Assistant Architect, War Office
- Frank Philip Hardy, Travelling Inspector, Central Stores Dept., Ministry of Munitions
- Maj. George Samuel Harries, Chairman, Swansea Advisory Committee
- Ethel Harris, Superintendent of Women Munition Workers Clubs, Erith and Carlisle
- Capt. Samuel Wallace Harris, Q.M., Headquarters, Irish Command
- William Thomas Hooper Harris, Chief Examiner, War Office
- George Hart-Cox, Munitions Stores Ofc., Woolwich Arsenal
- Maj. Edward John Morewood Harvey, Assistant Inspector of Small Arms, Ministry of Munitions
- Cmdr. Edwin William Harvey, Royal Naval Reserve, Dock Master, Southampton, London and South-Western Railway
- Capt. Nicholas Charles Harvey, Q.M., Headquarters, Northern Command
- William Harvey, Chief Inspector, Stockport Special Constabulary
- Charles Frederick Harvie, Supervising Clerk, War Office
- James Henry Harwood, Travelling Inspector, Central Stores Dept., Ministry of Munitions
- Arthur Haskins, Works Manager, Messrs. Hoffman Manufacturing Company Limited, Chelmsford
- Capt. Thomas Wilfred Haslam, Deputy Assistant Director of Railway Transport, Australian Imperial Force
- Peter Hastie, Shipyard Manager, Messrs. J. S. White & Company
- Robert Haswell, Sec., Messrs. W. Doxford & Sons
- Albert Victor Hawkins, Chief Inspector, Metropolitan Police
- Thomas Shirley Hawkins, Director of Works Dept., Admiralty
- Henrietta Louisa Hay, Organiser of Canteens in London Area, Munition Workers Welfare Committee, Y.W.C.A.
- Arthur W. Hayes, Sec.-in-Charge, East Kent Division, Y.M.C.A.
- Fredric James Hayes, Honorary Sec.-in-Charge, Lancashire Division, Y.M.C.A.
- Robert Hollbwell Headley, Staff Clerk, Military Dept., India Office
- Arthur William Heasman Assistant Architect, 2nd Class, H.M. Office of Works
- Maj. Herbert Charles Selwyn Heath, Deputy Assistant Inspector of Recruiting, Northern Command
- Florence Agnes Hebb, Chief Superintendent of Typists in Aeronautical Supply Dept., Air Board
- Alice Craig Henderson, Lady Superintendent, Knighton Auxiliary Hospital, Evington, Leicester
- George Blake Henderson, Works Manager on the Engineering Side, Messrs. Thornycroft & Company
- Jane Selina Henry
- John Henry, Private Sec. to the Sec. of the War Trade Dept.
- Agnes Mary Herbert, Voluntary Aid Detachment, New Zealand Expeditionary Force
- John Tordiffe Hewetson, Late Deputy Cashier in Charge, Royal Naval Torpedo Factory, Greenock
- James Baylis Heynes, British Vice-Consul at Messina
- Henry George Hibberd, Ordnance Store Dept., Admiralty
- Frank Sidney Higman, Y.M.C.A. Sec. for Wales
- Elizabeth Annie Higson
- Arthur James Hill, Assistant, Establishment Dept., Ministry of Munitions
- Capt. Henry Hincks, Ministry of National Service
- William Edwin Hincks JP Chairman of Leicester War Pensions Committee and Representative of the Ministry of Pensions, East Midlands
- Arthur Sidney Hines, Assistant, Staff Records and Premises, Labour Dept., Ministry of Munitions
- Violet Verve Hobart, Donor and Administrator, West Cliff Hall Auxiliary Hospital, Hythe
- William Stanley Hocking, Actuarial Clerk, War Trade Statistical Dept.
- Arthur Hogan, Chief Examiner, Exchequer and Audit Dept.
- Maj. George Justice Hogben, Auditor, Australian Imperial Force
- Lt. George Vincent Hoile, Royal Arty., Ordnance Dept., War Office
- Frank Holgate-Smith, Divisional Commandant, Kent Voluntary Aid Detachment, Superintendent of the St. John Ambulance Brigade, Canterbury
- Edith Clara Holland, Commandant, Cheadle House Auxiliary Hospital, Cheadle
- Frank Herbert Holloway, Assistant Superintending Engineer, Ministry of Munitions, No. 2 Area (North-West England)
- Annie Gertrude Holmes, Organiser of Naval Hospital, Hull
- Charles Stuart Hooper, Cashier the Finance Branch, Ministry of Shipping
- Charles Nugent Hope-Wallace, Ministry of Shipping
- Harry Sinclair Hopkins, Senior Bond Ofc., St. Helens, Ministry of Munitions
- Sydney Hopping, Acting Chief Examiner, Exchequer and Audit Dept.
- Walter Hopps, Commercial Steel Section, Iron and Steel Dept., Ministry of Munitions
- Florence Julia Horden, Commandant, Bryn Glas Auxiliary Hospital, Newport, Monmouthshire
- Andrew Coutts Home JP Shipping Agent, Queenstown
- Lt. Henry Spence Home, in charge, Registry, Whitehall Place, Ministry of Munitions
- John Laurence Hornibrook, Workman's Compensation Claims Finance Dept., Ministry of Munitions
- E. F. Houghton, in charge of Drawing Office, American Branch, Ministry of Munitions
- Maj. Alexander McLean Houston, Assistant to Ofc. in Charge of Canadian Records
- Arthur Henry Howard, Assistant, Legal Section, Priority Dept., Ministry of Munitions
- Carter William Howard, Deputy Superintendent of Printing, H.M. Stationery Office
- Holly Howard, Honorary Sec., Special and General Service Dept., East Lancashire, British Red Cross and Order of St. John of Jerusalem
- Maj. Alfred Harry Huddart, Inspecting Ofc. to Mechanical Transport, Ministry of Munitions
- Llewelyn Hugh-Jones, Honorary Representative of the Ministry of Pensions, North Wales
- Edward Hughes JP Ex-Mayor of Wrexham; Member of Wrexham Local Tribunal and of East Denbighshire Appeal Tribunal
- Helen Cornelia Huleatt, Ofc. in Charge, Hoole Bank and Hoole House Auxiliary Hospitals, Cheshire; Sec., Chester City Division, British Red Cross and Order of St. John of Jerusalem
- Edith Louisa Sophia Humphreys, Sec. to Surveyor-General of Supplies, War Office
- Harold Goundrill Humphreys, Sub-Section Director, Inland Transport, Ministry of Munitions
- Charles Henry Hunt, Clerk in Charge of Accounts, Treasury Solicitor's Dept.
- Joseph Henry Hunt, Superintendent, Supply Reserve Depot, Cattle Market, Deptford
- William Wright Hunt JP Chairman, Woodbridge Local Tribunal
- Capt. John Leslie Hunter, Head of Horse Supply Section, Food Production Dept.
- Marion Janet Hunter, Honorary Sec. to the Voluntary Aid Detachment Central Selection Board for Scotland
- Thomas Briggs Hunter, Civil Engineer, H.M. Dockyard, Rosyth
- Wilfred Leavold Hutchinson, Inspector, Small Arms Ammunition Dept., Ministry of Munitions
- Lt. Alfred Hutt, Sub-Section Director, Raw Materials Branch, Ministry of Munitions
- John Hutt, Ordnance Store Dept., Woolwich
- William Ross Hutton, Shipyard Manager, Messrs. R. & W. Hawthorn, Leslie & Company, Ltd.
- Arthur Frederick Ilsley, Assistant Sec. of the Iron and Steel Committee and Sec. of the Engineering Committee
- Frank Impey, Superintendence and Co-ordination of Brass Rod for Ministry of Munitions in Birmingham
- Kate Inglis, Assistant Superintendent and Sec., Princess Louise Convalescent Home for Nursing Sisters, France
- Blanche Ireland, Deputy Unit Administrator, Woman's Army Auxiliary Corps
- Lt. William Henry Martin Ives, Offices of the War Cabinet
- James Robertson Jack, Works Manager, Messrs. Denny Bros
- Alice Mabel Erskine Jackson
- Arthur Jackson, Trench Warfare Contracts, Contracts Dept., Ministry of Munitions
- Capt. Hugh Willan Jackson, Commandant, Wellingborough Special Constabulary
- Joseph Clough Jackson, Honorary Sec. of the Belgian Refugees Committee, Leeds
- James Picton James, Private Sec. to Controller, Raw Materials Branch, Ministry of Munitions
- Thomas Gwynfab James, Director of Elementary Education for the County of Monmouthshire
- William Arthur James, in charge, Compilation of Technical Costs, Contracts Dept., Ministry of Munitions
- Alexander Jamieson, Provost of Darvel; Member of Appeal Tribunal
- Charles Fleming Jamieson, Works Manager of Royal Albert Dock Branch of Messrs. R. & H. Green & Silley Weir Ltd.
- Lt. T. S. W. Jarvis, Interpreter to British Military Section in Russia, Ministry of Munitions
- Charles Nicholas Theodore Jeffreys, Chief Clerk, Brighton Special Constabulary
- Lt.-Cmdr. Charles Frewen Jenkin RNVR Air Board Technical Dept.
- Albert David Jenkins, Town Clerk of Guildford; Clerk to Guildford Local Tribunal, Belgian Refugee Committee, and Local Representative Committee
- Garnett Longsdon Jerrard, Archivist to His Britannic Majesty's Legation in Switzerland
- Frank Ashton Jewell JP Mayor of Barnstaple; Chairman of Barnstaple Local Tribunal
- Capt. Herbert Cecil Joel, in charge of Army Ordnance Depot, Gloucester Docks
- Frederick William Johnson, Manager, Southwark Filling Factory, Ministry of Munitions
- Samuel Johnson, Principal Clerk, Stamps and Stores, Inland Revenue
- William Johnson MP Warwickshire Miners Association, Member of Colliery Recruiting Court, Warwickshire
- John Jolly, Victualling Dept., Admiralty
- Edmund Vaughan Jones, Principal Assistant to Shipyard Manager, Messrs. Cammell Laird and Company, Ltd.
- George Jones, Special Constable attached to Chief Constable's Office, Portsmouth
- Harold Spencer Jones, Assistant Inspector of Optical Stores, Ministry of Munitions
- James Stuart Jones Inspector of Telegraph and Telephone Traffic, General Post Office
- Walter Owen Jones, Clerk to the Anglesey County Council; Clerk to Appeal Tribunal; Sec., Anglesey War Agricultural Executive Committee
- Capt. Cerdric Batson Joyner, Protected Badges and Occupations, Labour Supply Dept., Ministry of Munitions
- Charles Ernest William Justice, Military Sea Transport Branch, Ministry of Shipping
- Sydney Entwisle Kay, British Vice-Consul, Stockholm
- Arthur Richard Kearney, Chief Technical Adviser, Technical Organisation of Instructional Factories, Ministry of Munitions
- Margaret Alice Keary, Assistant Q.M., Auxiliary Hospital, Torquay
- Annie Margaret Keeble Smith, Welfare Superintendent, The Aston Construction Company, Ltd., London
- Frank Arthur Kelly, Senior Clerk, Metropolitan Asylums Board
- James Kelly, in charge, Price List of Munitions, Contracts Dept., Ministry of Munitions
- Robert Kelly, General Outside Manager, Engine Dept., Messrs. Alexander Stephen & Sons
- John Howard Kemp Welch, Messrs. Peter Brotherhood Limited
- William James Kenny, Civilian Clerk, Army Ordnance Dept.
- Helen Bethea Ker, Vice-President, Dumbartonshire Branch; of the Scottish Branch, British Red Cross Society
- Gladys Louise Kidd, Clerk in Charge of Copying Room, Treasury
- Arthur Frederic Kidson, Town Clerk, Folkestone; Clerk to the Folkestone Local Tribunal
- Flight Lt. Leon Joseph Killmayer, Royal Navy, Production Ofc., Seaplanes Branch, Air Board
- Norah King, Commandant, Voluntary Aid Detachment No. 26, Willingham Auxiliary Hospital, Cambridgeshire
- Henry Smails King, Acting Accountant in the War Office
- Mabel Cecil Kirk, Superintendent of Station Hut for Women Munition Workers, Coventry
- Richard Cameron Kirkwood, The Yorkshire Boiler Company Ltd.
- Wilfrid Robert Klitz, Agent for Furs and Skins, War Office
- Frank Knight, Second Class Clerk, Prison Commission
- George Knight, Photographer, The Central News Agency
- George Stodart Knocker, Assistant Engineer, Ministry of Munitions, No. 4 Area (Midlands)
- Edwin Lack, Assistant Staff Engineer, General Post Office
- Andrew Lamb, Great Northern Railway (Declined honour.)
- Brydon Lamb, Military Service (Civil Liabilities) Committee
- Dorothy Lamb, Ministry of National Service
- Helena Jane Landells, First Class Clerk, General Post Office, attached to War Office
- Harry Joseph Lane, Director, Messrs. J. J. Lane, Limited, London
- George Langlands, Outdoor Manager, Dock Dept., Engine Side, Messrs. Beardmore & Company
- Alfred Tabods Larter, Aeronautics Contracts, Contracts Dept., Ministry of Munitions
- Ernest Lingwood Lawes, Senior Ofc., Southend-on-Sea Special Constabulary
- Aubrey Trevor Lawrence, Sec. to the Central Stores Dept., Ministry of Munitions
- Ernest Laws, Clerk, Local Government Board
- Maud Matilda Layton, Head Masseuse, Almeric Paget Military Massage Corps
- William Leek, Inspector of Metalliferous Mines
- Arthur Leggett, Works Manager, Messrs. E. R. and F. Turner, Ipswich
- Lt. George Legh-Jones, Naval Sea Transport Branch, Ministry of Shipping
- Louis Levi, Manager of Trench Warfare Dept. Watford Filling Factory, Ministry of Munitions
- Janet Marion Terry Lewis, Lady Superintendent, Ministry of Labour [formerly Office Sec'y Gramophone Co., 1897-1900].
- Jessie Liddiard, Superintendent of Women Clerks, Ministry of Pensions
- Edgar William Light, Treaty Dept., Foreign Office
- Henry Lightbody JP Honorary Sec., Y.M.C.A. in Scotland
- Charles Swift Lillicrap, Royal Corps of Naval Constructors
- Frederic Caesar Linfield JP Assistant, Munitions Inventions Dept.
- Agnes Evelyn Linnell, Commandant, Auxiliary Hospital, Sheringham, Norfolk
- William Little, London, Brighton and South Coast Railway
- Geraldine Livesey, Inspection Assistant Welfare Superintendent, Woolwich Arsenal
- Frederick Allen Llewellyn, Assistant Architect, 2nd Class, H.M. Office of Works
- William Ewart Llewellyn, Superintendent of Chart Issues, Hydrographic Dept., Admiralty
- Daniel Charles Lloyd, Messrs. F. H. Lloyd & Company, Ltd.
- Alice Lloyd Jones, Commandant, Cecil Road Auxiliary Hospital, Hale
- Thomas Lockwood-Bunce, Technical Inspecting Engineer, Machine Tool Dept., Ministry of Munitions
- Edith Annie Lomax, Controller, Women Staff, Military Intelligence Branch, War Office
- Arthur Thompson Longbotham, Clerk to the Guardians, Halifax
- Arthur Frederick Longdon, Chairman, Derby Local Tribunal
- Charles Lupton Lord, Collector of Customs and Excise, Hull
- Frederic Reynolds Lovett, Labour Enlistment Complaint Section, Labour Supply Dept., Ministry of Munitions
- Catherine Howard Lowe, Commandant, Auxiliary Hospital, New Mills, Derbyshire
- Dorothy Ann Shelmerdine Lowe, Commandant, Auxiliary Hospital, Hinton St. George, Crewkerne, Somerset
- Robert Luck, Assistant Commandant, Islington Internment Camp
- Horace Sampson Lyne, Superintendent, Newport (Mon.) Special Constabulary
- Eva Flora Caroline Macdonald
- Florence Macdonald, Superintendent of Women Munition Workers Club, Lancaster
- John Angus Macdonald JP Chairman, Ilkeston Local Tribunal; Member of Ilkeston Local Representative Committee and of Executive Committee of Derbyshire Representative Committee
- Walter Mace Macfarlane, of Sir W. G. Armstrong, Whitworth & Company, Ltd.
- Archibald Bow Macgregor, Shipyard Manager to Ailsa Shipbuilding Company
- John MacGregor, District Superintendent, Caledonian Railway, Aberdeen
- Eric Machtig, Second Class Clerk, Colonial Office
- John Andrew Macintyre, Assistant Engineer, H.M. Office of Works
- Colin MacKay, Station Master, Highland Railway, Inverness
- John George Mackay, Member of Appeal Tribunal, Isle of Skye
- George Frank Mackrow, Inside Manager, Warship Work, Messrs. R. & W. Hawthorn, Leslie & Company
- William Archibald MacLellan, Shop Superintendent, Austin Motor Company, Ltd., Birmingham
- John MacQueen, Works Manager on Machinery Side, Messrs. Denny Brothers
- Margaret Marsden Macqueen, Assistant Director, Women's Branch, Food Production Dept.
- Frank Macers, Chief Assistant, Design and Construction of Explosives Factories, Ministry of Munitions
- Melville Pownall Main, In charge of French Section, Allied Branch, Requirements and Statistics Dept., Ministry of Munitions
- Adam Maitland DL JP Chairman of City of Aberdeen Local Tribunal Advisory Committee
- Agatha Caroline Makins, Commandant, Auxiliary Hospital, Henley-on-Thames
- Jeanne Marie Malcolm, Lady Sec. at Headquarters, Y.M.C.A.
- William Malcolm, Executive Ofc. for Food Production, Lanarkshire
- John Moore Mallett, Personal Assistant to the Director of Works, Admiralty
- Frederick Mallinson, Commissioned Auxiliary Fleet Section, Ministry of Shipping
- Gerard Noel Cornwallis Mann, Tractor Representative for Norfolk and Suffolk, Food Production Dept.
- William Henry Mann, County Director, Tyrone, British Red Cross and Order of St. John of Jerusalem; Treasurer of Our Day Fund in Ulster
- Albert John Manning, Senior Clerk, Recruiting Dept., Ministry of National Service
- Helen Marchbank, Assistant in British Consulate, Tampico
- Ethel Gertrude Marriott, Inspection Welfare Superintendent, Ministry of Munitions, Manchester and East Lancashire
- Beatrix Maria Martin, Late Commandant, Auxiliary Hospital, Shrubland Park, Coddenham, Suffolk
- Ernest Charles Martin, Head of Labour Supply Section, Food Production Dept.
- John Bentick Martin, British Vice-Consul at Trondhjem
- William Thomas Mason, Constructive Dept., H.M. Dockyard, Devonport
- Joseph Louis Mather, In charge, Artificers Allocation Section, Labour Supply Dept., Ministry of Munitions
- William Thomas Matthews, Staff Clerk, War Trade Statistical Dept.
- Paul John Mavrogordato, Personal Assistant to Controller, Finance Dept., Ministry of Munitions
- Lucy Powys Maybery, Commandant, Voluntary Aid Detachment No. 18, Brecknockshire
- William Mayne, Acting Accountant in the War Office
- David McCall, Outside Manager of Ayrshire Dockyard Company, Ltd.
- George William Richardson McCammon, Royal Corps of Naval Constructors
- Gerald Bernard McCormick, Royal Navy, Ordnance Store Dept., Chatham
- Maude McGavin, Acting Assistant to the Supervisor of Copying, Colonial Office
- James McGowan, Scottish Surveyor of Taxes
- Donald McBrayne McLachlan, Outdoor Hull Manager of Submarine Dept., Messrs. Beardmore & Company
- Maurice Paterson McLaren, Assistant Engineer, H.M. Office of Works
- Esther Fanny McLean, Commandant, Voluntary Aid Detachment No. 154, County of London
- Capt. John Reid McLean JP Divisional Cmdr., Metropolitan Special Constabulary
- Matthew Adam McLean, Shop Superintendent, British Westinghouse Electric and Manufacturing Company, Ltd., Manchester
- Norman McManus, Works Manager, Dundee National Shell Factory, Ministry of Munitions
- Julia McMordie, President of St. John Voluntary Aid Detachments, Belfast
- Alice Margaret Meadows, Superintendent, 606th Motor Transport Company, Army Service Corps
- Walter Alfred Medorow, Air Dept., Admiralty
- William Melville MVO JP Military Intelligence Branch, War Office
- Herbert Melville Smith, Manager, King's Norton Filling Factory and National Filling Factory, Abbey Wood, Ministry of Munitions
- Charles Duncan Menzies, Donor of Lynehurst Auxiliary Hospital, West Linton, Peeblesshire
- Henry John Merriman, Research Dept., Woolwich Arsenal
- Edith Minna Metcalfe, Honorary Organising Relief Sec., Chatham Naval Branch, Soldiers' and Sailors' Families Association
- John Methven, Assistant Sec. to the City of Dundee Branch, Scottish Branch, British Red Cross Society
- John Deeble Michell, Chief Architectural Adviser, War Office
- Charles Michie, Representative of the Ministry of Pensions, North Scotland
- Ella Morison Millar
- Annie Miller, Commandant, The Highlands Auxiliary Hospital, Shortheath, Farnham, Surrey
- John Edwin Mills, London and South-Western Railway
- Richard Tudor Millward, Exchequer and Audit Dept.
- George Milne, Assistant Shipyard Manager of Messrs. Hall, Russell & Company, Ltd.
- John Ferguson Milne, Assistant Architect, 2nd Class, H.M. Office of Works
- John Robertson Milne, Central Accounts, Finance Dept., Ministry of Munitions
- Herbert Samuel Mingard, Assistant Director, Contracts Section, Explosives Supply Dept., Ministry of Munitions
- George Bennett Mitchell, Red Cross Transport Ofc., Aberdeen
- John Adamson Mitchell, Dockyard Manager, Scotts Shipbuilding and Engineering Company, Ltd., Greenock
- Walter Mitchell, Engine Works Manager, Scotts Shipbuilding and Engineering Company, Ltd., Greenock
- Alexander George Moffatt, Sectional Cmdr., Swansea Special Constabulary
- Annie Maitland Moir, Lady Sec. for Scotland, Y.M.C.A.
- Frederick William Moll, District Inspector of Stores Construction, Ministry of Munitions
- Owen Monk, Prisoners of War Dept., Foreign Office
- William Dusar Monk, Q.M. of Lewisham Military Hospital
- Olive Eleanor Monkhouse, Chief Woman Dilution Ofc., Labour Dept., Ministry of Munitions
- Eleanora Montford, Commandant and Matron, Broadway House Auxiliary Hospital, Church Stoke, Montgomeryshire
- Isabella Macalister Montgomerie
- John Morgan, Superintendent, Stoke-on-Trent Special Constabulary
- Arthur Morson, Clerk to the Rugby Urban District Council; Clerk to the Rugby Urban Tribunal and to the Local Representative Committee
- Lucy Aylwin Morten-Turner, Commandant, Lady's Close Auxiliary Hospital, Watford
- Arthur Herbert Moseley, Sec., Birmingham Munitions Board of Management
- George Sinclair Moss, British Consular Assistant, Weihaiwei
- Frank Jago Munford, Statistical Dept., Ministry of National Service
- Henry Palmer Murphy, Personal Assistant to Controller of Inspection, Ministry of Munitions
- Jerome Bernard Murphy, Cunard Agent, Queenstown
- James Robertson Murray, British Vice-Consul (Acting Consul), Colon
- Maynard Mylrea, Lady Superintendent, Y.M.C.A., Sling Plantation, Salisbury Plain
- Harold Walter Naish, Trench Warfare Finances, Finance Dept., Ministry of Munitions
- Ada Grace Neame, Commandant, Christchurch Auxiliary Hospital, Beckenham
- James Henry Needham, Yard Manager, Messrs. Sir James Laing & Sons
- William Nelson, Technical Adviser to Shipyard Labour Dept., Admiralty
- Alice Jane Winifred Nicholas, Chief Dairy Instructress, Cornwall County Council
- Evelyn Joanna Nicholson, Q.M., Vernon Institute Auxiliary Hospital, Great Saughall, Chester
- Capt. John Steel Nicholson, Technical Adviser, Materials and Accessories Branch, Air Board
- John Strathdel Nicol, British Explosives Syndicate
- Beatrice Norrie, Lady Superintendent, Giro's Club, and Y.M.C.A. Hostel, London Bridge
- James Northam, Admiralty
- George H. A. Northcott, Sec. in Charge, Eastern Counties Division, Y.M.C.A.
- Leslie Richard Notley, Assistant, Printing Branch, Ministry of Munitions
- Harry Augustus Nott, Electrical Dept., H.M. Dockyard, Devonport
- Reuben Oakeshott, Chief of Stores Branch, Woolwich Arsenal
- Helen Leslie Ogilvie, Supervisor of Garments for NorthEastern District, Scottish Branch, British Red Cross Society
- James William Olive, Superintendent, Metropolitan Police
- Arthur O'Reilly, Supervising Clerk, Honours Section of the Military Sec.'s Dept., War Office
- John Maurice Orniston, Principal Assistant, Repair Dept., Cammell Laird & Company
- Sybil Margaret Orpen, Q.M., Kensington Division, County of London, British Red Cross and Order of St. John of Jerusalem
- C. J. Orton, Late Organiser of Shell Forging Distribution, Ministry of Munitions
- Ethel Margaret Oswald Oswald, Head Masseuse, Almeric Paget Military Massage Corps
- James Thomas Ottewill, Warship Manager in Shipbuilding Dept., Fairfield Shipbuilding and Engineering Company, Ltd.
- Eugenie Josephine Oudin, Superintendent, Translation Bureau, War Office
- John Albert Owen, South-Eastern and Chatham Railway
- Edward Page, Fishery Ofc. of the Sussex Local Sea Fisheries Committee
- Sydney David Pallin, Superintendent of Refuge for Belgians at Edmonton
- Horace Frank Palmer, Accountant-General's Dept., Admiralty
- May Blanche Palmer, Superintendent of Women Munition Workers Hostel, Slades Green
- William George Pape, London, Brighton & South Coast Railway
- George Herbert Parr, British Vice-Consul, Rio de Janeiro
- Janie Ramsbottom Paul, in charge of Red Cross Working Parties in Dumbartonshire
- Catherine Swan Paull, Commandant of St. Matthew's Hall Auxiliary Hospital, St. Mary's Road, Willesden
- Janet Payne, Organiser and President of the Red Cross Ladies Workroom in Alexandria
- Winifred Pead, Administrative Assistant, Contracts Branch, Air Board
- Agnes Isobel Pearce, Voluntary Aid Detachment, New Zealand Expeditionary Force
- Walter Peel JP Member of Liverpool Local Representative Committee
- Howard Peet, Superintendent, Signalling Section, Grimsby Special Constabulary
- Richard Gall Peirce, Accountant-General's Dept., Admiralty
- Henry William Pell, Assistant Engineer, Ministry of Munitions, No. 3 Area (Yorkshire)
- Charlie Pelling, Shop Superintendent, Messrs. White, Allom & Company, London
- George Henry Perry, Deputy Head Chemist, Inspection Dept., Woolwich Arsenal
- Bernard Richard Peters, Assistant Inspector of Gun Ammunition (Technical), Ministry of Munitions
- Cecil James Razzell Peters, Assistant Director of Propellant Branch, Explosives Supply Dept., Ministry of Munitions
- Walter Bell Pettet, Released Soldiers Records, Labour Supply Dept., Ministry of Munitions
- David Phillips, Works Manager, Messrs. Nevill Druce & Company, Llanelly
- Henry Dixon Phillips JP Chairman, Eastern Counties Division, Y.M.C.A.
- Henry Thomas Phillips, Trench Warfare Contracts, Contracts Dept., Ministry of Munitions
- James Falkner Phillips, Civil Assistant, Board of Invention and Research, Admiralty
- John Henry Phillips, Personal Assistant to Controller, Labour Regulation Dept., Ministry of Munitions
- Walter John Phillips, Senior Examiner, Pay Office
- Alice Mabel Pickering, Commandant of Arnold's Auxiliary Voluntary Aid Detachment Hospital, Doncaster
- Henry Pilling, Messrs. Galloways Ltd.
- The Reverend Arnold Theophilus Biddulph Pinchard, Sec. to the Birmingham Lord Mayor's Committee for Organising Hospitality for Refugees
- Charles Pinkham JP Chairman, Willesden Local Tribunal
- Arthur Piper, Acting Paymaster, Army Pay Dept.
- Alfred John Button Pippard, Head of Sub-section in Technical Dept. of Air Board
- Charles Russell Pledger, Aeronautics Finance, Finance Dept., Ministry of Munitions
- Amy Pomeroy, for executing a task requiring exceptional courage and self-sacrifice
- Amy Porter, Commandant, Auxiliary Hospital, Highbury, Birmingham
- Francis Martin Potter, Superintendent, H.M. Factory, Penrhyndeudraeth, Ministry of Munitions
- Edward Cecil Poultney, in charge, Machine Tool Section, American Branch, Ministry of Munitions
- George Power, Sec., Midland Leather Trades Federation
- Vernon Hamilton Poynter, Honorary Sec., Committee for Purchase of Army Camp Refuse
- Maye Alice Pressley Smith, Shorthand Typist to His Majesty's Legation in Norway
- Ernest Price, Supervisor, India Store Depot, India Office
- Janet Price-Williams, Honorary Organising Sec., Cardiff Women's Advisory Committee
- Ernest Edward Prower, Travelling Inspector, Central Stores Dept., Ministry of Munitions
- Henry James Prytherch, Head of Military Office Staff, Great Eastern Railway
- Frederick Hayden Purchas, District Stores Superintendent, Manchester, Ministry of Munitions
- Henry James Quick, Electrical Dept., H.M. Dockyard, Chatham
- Joseph Rogers Quilter, Sec. to the Drapers Chamber of Trade
- John Raddiffe, Representative of the Ministry of Pensions, South-West England
- George William Rankin, Y.M.C.A. Building Sec.
- John Arthur Rankin, Outside Manager of Engine and Boiler Works, Messrs. John Brown & Company, Ltd.
- George Daniel Read, Ofc. in Charge of Admiralty Works, Ipswich, Shotley and Yarmouth Districts
- Joseph William Reading, Clerk in Registrar-General's Dept.
- Annie Bradley Readman, Sec.'s Dept., Admiralty
- Maj. Charles Clements Reid, Honorary Sec. and Treasurer, Clackmannan and Kinross, Scottish Branch, British Red Cross Society
- Isabella Elizabeth Reid, in charge of Red Cross Rest Room and Hostel at Aberdeen
- Clement Unsworth Reynolds, Commandant and Transport Ofc., Stockport Division, British Red Cross Society
- William Howe Reynolds, Staff Ofc., Chief Industrial Comm.'s Dept.
- Capt. David Mackinlay Potter Roach, Production Ofc., Engines Branch, Air Board
- Percy Christopher Rice, Financial Dept., Foreign Office
- George Herbert Richardson, Inspector of Clothing, Royal Army Clothing Dept.
- Peter Richardson, Member of Appeal Tribunal, Dumbarton
- Alfred Charles James Rickett, Private Sec. to Controller, Controlled Establishments Branch, Ministry of Munitions
- Graham Stanley Rider, Sub-Section Director, Inland Transport, Ministry of Munitions
- Lewis Herbert Rider, Finance Branch, Ministry of Shipping
- Patrick Riordan, Superintendent of Registry, Board of Agriculture
- Arthur Henry Riseley, Honorary Sec., Bristol Citizens Recruiting Committee
- Sir James William Ritchie Bt Divisional Cmdr., Metropolitan Special Constabulary
- Ernest Roberts, Manchester War Pensions Committee
- Herbert Wallace Roberts, Chief Chemist, H.M. Factory, Qualferry, Ministry of Munitions
- Robert Henry Robertshaw, Junior Clerk, Civil Service Commission
- John Robertson, Lanarkshire Miners Union, Member of Collier Recruiting Court, Lanarkshire
- James Constable Robertson JP Town Councillor of Dundee
- Winifred Agnes Florence Robertson, Director of Statistics Dept., Admiralty
- George Lovely Robinson, Outside Manager, Messrs. Fletcher, Son & Fearnall
- William Charles Robinson, Superintendent, Metropolitan Police
- James Robson JP President of Durham Miners Association; Assessor to the Colliery Recruiting Court
- George James Nicholas Rogers, Clerk, Local Government Board
- Richard Hawke Rogers, Messrs. Smith & Sons, Ltd.
- Thomas Edward Rogers, Outside Iron Manager, Messrs. Swan, Hunter & Wigham Richardson, Ltd.
- William Romney, Agent in Charge of Folkestone Harbour, South-Eastern and Chatham Railway
- James Francis Ronca, Board of Trade
- Edith Rose, Sec. of Lord Mayor's Committee, Liverpool, for reception, care and maintenance of refugees
- Jane Rossall, Commandant and Principal Founder, The Star Hills Auxiliary Hospital, Lytham
- James MacKean Rowbotham, in charge of Shell Forging Section, Ministry of Munitions
- Arthur Maynard Rowland, Chief Technical Assistant for Optical Machinery, Machine Tool Dept., Ministry of Munitions
- Mildred Rowley, Commandant, Voluntary Aid Detachment No. 42, Histon Auxiliary Hospital, Cambridgeshire
- Henry George Rowlinson JP Forest of Dean Miners Association; Member of Colliery Recruiting Court, Forest of Dean
- Harry James Roworth, Statistical Branch, Gun Ammunition Dept., Ministry of Munitions
- Arthur Albert Rowse, Late Head Trench Warfare Engineer, Ministry of Munitions, No. 4 Area Midlands
- Thomas Wright Royle, London Confidential Assistant to Superintendent of the Line, Lancashire and Yorkshire Railway
- Herbert Llewellyn Rutter FRCS Ofc. in Charge of Wounded Convoys, Northumberland
- The Hon. Lockhart Matthew St. Clair CIE Divisional Cmdr., Metropolitan Special Constabulary
- Ella Victoire Sandeman, Ofc. in Charge, The Crescent Auxiliary Hospital, Hayling Island
- Walter Anthony Sargent, Midland Railway
- Harold Eustace Satow, His Britannic Majesty's Consul, Larissa
- Edward Saunders JP Mayor of Harwich; Chairman of the Harwich Food Control Committee and of the Local Representative Committee
- George William Saunders, Ships Requisitioning Branch, Ministry of Shipping
- Thomas Arthur Saunders, Clerk in Registrar-General's Dept.
- Ernst Schiff, Manager of the Poland Street Refuge for Belgian Refugees and Member of the Jewish Refugee Committee
- Hubert Arthur Secretan, Naval Sea Transport Branch, Ministry of Shipping
- James Seddon, Commandant, Ashton-under-Lyne Special Constabulary
- Walter Sexton, Organiser of Transport Service, Dublin, British Red Cross and Order of St. John of Jerusalem
- Lettice Seymour, Commandant, Hill Crest Auxiliary Hospital, Coventry
- Thomas George Shacklady, Messrs. Curtis & Harvey, Ltd.
- Ethel Mary Reader Shakespear Birmingham War Pensions Committee
- Matthew Joseph Sheridan, Collector of Customs and Excise, Newcastle
- Percy Thomas Shorey, Confidential Clerk, Home Office
- Robert Siddle, Sec., Amalgamated Society of Leather Workers
- Herbert Sidebottom, Superintendent, Remount Service
- Arthur Molyneux Sillar, Assistant Superintending Engineer, Ministry of Munitions, No. 7 Area (Metropolitan)
- Percy Simmonds, Acting Paymaster, Army Pay Dept.
- John Leonard Simpson, Messrs. A. Harper, Sons & Bean, Ltd.
- George Greig Sinclair, Acting Civil Engineer, in charge of Works, Royal Naval Air Service, Central Depot, Cranwell
- William Sacheverell Sitwell, Clerk to the Cornwall Appeal Tribunal and Sec. to the County Patriotic Fund
- Edward John Skinner, Electrical Engineer, Fairfield Shipbuilding and Engineering Company
- James Cameron Smail, Organiser of Trade Schools under the Education Committee of the London County Council; District Manager, Metropolitan Munitions Committee
- Alexander Smith, Assistant Shipyard Manager, Messrs. Vickers, Ltd.
- Albert Smith, Head Master of the Westville Road Council School, Hammersmith
- Clarence Dalrymple Smith
- Frank William Smith, Head of Military Traffic Dept., Great Central Railway
- Gladys Augusta Smith, Private Sec. to Acting Chief of British War Mission in U.S.A.
- Harold Smith, Shop Superintendent, Messrs. Mather & Platt, Ltd., Manchester
- Harold Robert Smith, Honorary Sec., Suffolk Auxiliary Hospital, Ampton Hall, Bury St. Edmunds
- James Alfred Smith, Staff Clerk, Colonial Office
- Rodney Smith, Y.M.C.A. Worker
- Sydney Smith, Assistant Engineer, Ministry of Munitions, No. 4 Area (Midlands)
- Francis Watson Smyth, Acting Paymaster, Army Pay Dept.
- John Snell, Inspector, Horticultural Branch, Board of Agriculture
- Frederick Cousins Snowden, Q.M. of the Hammersmith Military Hospital
- John Sommerville, Senior Bond Ofc., Shepherd's Bush, Ministry of Munitions
- Wilfrid Guy Spear, Private Sec. to the Accountant-General of the Navy
- Edward Francis Spiller, in charge, Registry and Accommodation, Ministry of Munitions, Grand Hotel, etc.
- Edward Tom Springate, Traffic Agent, Newhaven, London, Brighton and South Coast Railway
- Samuel Springer, Head of the General Dept., Foreign Trade Dept.
- Joseph Cooper Squirrell, Chief of Emergency Division, Ipswich Special Constabulary
- Fanny Stacey, Commandant, Auxiliary Hospital, Bishop's Stortford
- John Stafford, Class A Clerk, War Office
- James William Stafford, Passport Dept., Foreign Office
- Louis Donald Stansfield, Royal Corps of Naval Constructors
- The Reverend Richard Staple, Chief Ofc., Canterbury Special Constabulary
- William Edgar Stephens, Town Clerk, Great Yarmouth; Clerk to the Great Yarmouth Local Tribunal
- Herbert Given Stevenson, Representative of the Ministry of Pensions, North Ireland
- Elizabeth Woodhead Stewart, Voluntary Aid Detachment, New Zealand Expeditionary Force
- Carruthers Jean Stewart, Organising Sec. for the North of England, Munition Workers Welfare Committee, Y.W.C.A.
- John Stewart, Sec., West Perthshire District Food Production Committee
- Robert Stewart, Postmaster, Margate
- Ernest Henry Stall, Messrs. W. W. Still & Sons, Ltd.
- Richard Albert Stokes, Manager, Morecambe National Filling Factory, Ministry of Munitions
- Ethel Mary Hutton Storey, County Sec., Voluntary Aid Detachments, County of Durham
- John Storey FRAS First Assistant Astronomer, Royal Observatory, Scotland; now serving in the Dept. of the Director of Naval Ordnance, Admiralty
- Irene Strevens, Chief Superintendent of Women Clerks in Casualty Section, War Office
- Ernest Edward Stringer, Registrar of the Foreign Trade Dept.
- John Stubbs, Principal, Hughes-Stubbs Metal Company, Birmingham
- Ellen Elizabeth Stuckey, Voluntary Aid Detachment, New Zealand Expeditionary Force
- Harold Sumner, Assistant County Director, East Lancashire, British Red Cross Society
- Capt. Lewis George Sydenham, Ministry of National Service
- Mary Louisa Sykes, Organiser and Donor, Auxiliary Hospital, Cross Hawell, Rossett, Denbighshire
- Percy Duncan Sykes, Contract Dept., Admiralty
- Percy James Symmons, in charge of Movement of Materials, Central Stores Dept., Ministry of Munitions
- Charles Crump Tancock, Superintendent, Docks Station, Southampton
- John Reuben Tapp, Acting Victualling Store Ofc., Aberdeen
- Grace Rosina Tasker, in charge of Clothing Depot for Stirlingshire, Scottish Branch, British Red Cross Society
- Mary Beatrice Churchill Tayler, Clerk, Intelligence Branch, Procurator-General's Dept.
- Alice Maud Rowson Taylor, Commandant, Windy Knowe Auxiliary Hospital, Blundellsands, West Lancashire
- Arthur Thomas Taylor, Assistant Principal Ofc., Sugar Distribution Branch, Ministry of Food
- Charles Taylor, Accountant-General's Dept., Admiralty
- Esther Hilda Taylor, Private Sec. to the Sec. of the Ministry of National Service
- George Wilson Taylor, Clerk to the Central (Unemployed) Body, for London; Clerk to the London Appeal Tribunal and Special Tribunal
- Percy Taylor, Chief Examiner, War Office
- Charles Temperley, Cmdr. and Transport Ofc., Metropolitan Special Constabulary
- Dorothy Mary Gladys Temperley, Assistant, Historical Section, Requirements and Statistics Dept., Ministry of Munitions
- Charlton Thew, Works Manager, Messrs. Hawthorn, Leslie & Company
- Arthur Augustus Thomas, Military Representative, Holloway Tribunal
- Olive Morton Thomas, Private Sec. to the Chairman of the War Trade Intelligence Dept.
- George Thompson, Managing Director, Messrs. H. W. Ward & Company, Ltd., Birmingham
- Adam Robert Thomson, First Division Clerk, Railway Dept., Board of Trade
- Archibald Thomson, Outside Manager of Messrs. William Hamilton & Company, Ltd.
- Margaret Eleanor Thomson, Cmdr. in Charge, Auxiliary Hospital, Penrith
- John Samuel Alphonso McCoan Thornhill, Chief Superintendent of the Map Printing Dept. of the Ordnance Survey of the United Kingdom
- Reginald Ernest Thornley, Assistant Principal Ofc., Establishment Section, Ministry of Food
- Hannah Maude Taylor Thorpe, Commandant, Voluntary Aid Detachment No. 42, Nottinghamshire
- Hugh Kingsmill Neville Thurston, Cmdr., Plymouth Special Constabulary
- Hugh Gorham Ticehurst, Thames Ammunition Works, Erith
- Violet Beatrice Till, Commandant and Organiser of Nurses Hostel, Surrey
- Henry Tom, British Vice-Consul, Rotterdam
- Marion Tomkinson, Commandant, Auxiliary Hospital, The Larches, Kidderminster
- John Tourtel, Assistant Inspector of Munitions, U.S.A.
- Arthur Henry Towle, First Class Surveyor of Taxes, Inland Revenue
- Lucy Mabel Townsend, in charge of Hospital Surgical Supply Depot, Scottish Branch, British Red Cross Society
- Anna Townshend, Commandant, Auxiliary Hospital, The Hermitage, Solihull
- Edward John Tozer, Chief Registrar, Controller's Dept., Admiralty
- Gwendoline Chenevix-Trench, Administrator, Fenrhyn Cottage Auxiliary Hospital, Carnarvonshire
- Rosamond, Baroness Trevor, Donor and Organiser, Brynkinalt Auxiliary Hospital, Chirk, Denbighshire
- William Burrows Trick JP Chairman, Neath Rural District Council; Chairman, Neath Rural Local Tribunal
- Oliver Trigger, Deputy Head Chemist, Inspection Dept., Woolwich Arsenal
- Harry Woodward Trotter, Committee Clerk, Customs and Excise
- Ada Mary Turner, Superintendent of Women Munition Workers Club, Gravesend
- Maj. George Bankart Turner, Engineer in Charge of Production, Royal Aircraft Factory
- Helen Turner, Matron of the Central Work Rooms, Royal Academy
- William Henry Turton, Manager, Gun and Carriage Factories, Woolwich Arsenal
- James Tweedale, Works Manager, Messrs. T. Robinson & Sons, Ltd., Railway Works, Rochdale
- Walter Gerald Vann, Sec. of the British Farmers Fund
- George Vardy, Engine Works Manager, Messrs. Swan, Hunter & Wigham Richardson, Ltd., Wallsend-on-Tyne
- John Varley, Chief Investigator, Machine Tool Dept., Ministry of Munitions
- Arthur Ronald Vaughan, Assistant to Engineering Manager, Messrs. Cammell Laird and Company, Ltd.
- Ruth Sarah Vigers, Assistant Sec., Ofc.s (Convalescent Homes Dept., British Red Cross and Order of St. John
- Harold Decimus Vigor, Sec., Royal Commission on Wheat Supplies
- Albert William Viney, Shop Manager, Royal Naval Torpedo Factory, Greenock
- Nancy Lycett, Baroness Vivian, Lady Superintendent, Y.M.C.A. Hut, Euston
- Francis Richard Wade, Assistant Inspector of Gun Ammunition (Supervisory), Ministry of Munitions
- Edward Waggott, Sir W. G. Armstrong, Whitworth & Company, Ltd.
- Col. Charles Richard Wainwright TD DL JP Chairman, Ashton-under-Lyne Local Tribunal
- Alice May Waite, Private Sec. to Controller, Optical Munitions, Glassware and Potash Production, Ministry of Munitions
- Alexander Mann Walker, Divisional Cmdr., West Riding Special Constabulary
- Charles Edmund Walker, Messrs. J. Stone and Company
- John Drummond Walker, Naval Sea Transport Branch, Ministry of Shipping
- John Frederick Walker, Royal Corps of Naval Constructors
- Maria Edith Walker, Commandant, Voluntary Aid Detachment No. 24, Auxiliary Hospital, Spilsby, Lincolnshire
- Robert Walker, Late Private Sec. to Director-General of Inspection of Munitions
- Augusta Maud Wallace
- Robert Wallis, Works Manager, Wallsend Slipway and Engineering Company
- John Thomas Walton, Shop Superintendent, Woolsey Sheep Shearing Machine Company, Limited, Birmingham
- Caroline Theodora Ward, Commandant of Burntwood Auxiliary Hospital, Caterham
- Charles Wardle, Sec. of the Nottingham Lace Workers Union
- Percy Thomas Wardle, Sec., Messrs. William Muir and Co., Ltd., Manchester
- Arthur Glyn Watkins, Manager, Gloucester Filling Factory, Ministry of Munitions
- Thomas Percival Holmes Watkins, Clerk to the Guardians, Pontypool; Clerk to the Panteg Local Tribunal
- Isabella Clark Watson, Voluntary Aid Detachment, New Zealand Expeditionary Force
- William George Watson, Constructive Dept., Pembroke Dock
- Henry Charles Watts, Head of Sub-Section of Air Board, Technical Dept.
- Adam Weatherhead, Superintendent, Middlesbrough Special Constabulary
- Ella Gertrude Amy Webb Lady District Superintendent, St. John Ambulance Brigade, Dublin
- Ellen, Lady Webb, Donor and Commandant, Llwynarthan Auxiliary Hospital, Castleton, Cardiff
- Herbert Stephen Webb, Naval Store Dept., Admiralty
- Walter Weighell, Contraband Dept. Registry
- George Jackson Weir, Factory Accounts, Finance Dept., Ministry of Munitions
- Cecile Campbell Welsh
- James Hales West, Superintendent, Metropolitan Police
- John Lowe Westland, Surveyor, Director of Works Dept., Admiralty
- Edith Ivy Weston
- Thomas Angas Wheatley, Messrs. Beck & Company
- Alfred James Whitby, Staff Clerk, Finance Division, H.M. Office of Works
- Arthur White, Superintendent, Metropolitan Police
- Jesse Obadiah White, Constructive Dept., H.M. Dockyard, Chatham
- Percy Ernest White, Senior Ofc., Portsmouth Special Constabulary
- Professor Robert George White Technical Adviser, Food Production Dept.
- Gerald Whiting, Yard Manager, Messrs. Sir W. G. Armstrong, Whitworth & Company, Ltd.
- George Jackson Whitten, Surveyor (Permanent), War Office
- Lt.-Col. Herbert John Whittle, Ministry of National Service
- Christopher Henry George Wilkinson, Naval Store Dept., Admiralty
- Charles Robert Thomas Williams, Late Assistant Director, Enrolled Labour Section, Labour Supply Dept., Ministry of Munitions
- Ernest Graham Williams, Naval Sea Transport Branch, Ministry of Shipping
- Isabel Rose Williams, Lady Superintendent, Y.M.C.A. Hut, Waterloo Road
- Elizabeth Williams Wynn, County Sec., Denbigh and Flintshire, British Red Cross and Order of St. John of Jerusalem
- Rose Willson, Donor and late Commandant of Ranceby Ball Auxiliary Hospital, Grantham
- Harry Gouldie Wilson FCA Accountant-General's Dept., Admiralty
- William Wilson, Outside Manager, Northumberland Shipbuilding Company
- Rowland Winn, Tractor Representative for Yorkshire, Food Production Dept.
- Henry Elsbury Winter, Sergeant, Carlisle Special Constabulary
- Constance Evelyn Winwood Smith, Personal Assistant to Director of Supply and Production, Air Board
- Percy Furlong Wise, Inspector of Gun Ammunition (Supervisory), Ministry of Munitions
- Ralph Wolfenden, Assistant, National Physical Laboratory
- Frances Mary Wood, Contracts Branch, War Office
- Lt. Thomas Wood, in charge of Red Cross Motor Repair Works, Boulogne
- Charles Merllynn Woodford, Organiser of the War Trade Dept. Registry
- Amy Wood-Hill, Commandant, Auxiliary Hospital, Beccles, Suffolk
- Charlie Roland Woods, Sec. of the Horse Rationing Committee and of the Board of Trade Iron and Steel Committee
- Irene Woodyear, Military Intelligence Branch, War Office
- Frank George Woollard, Technical Director of Messrs. E. G. Wrigley & Company, Ltd., Birmingham
- Andrew Charles Woolmer, Superintendent, H.M. Factory, Swindon, Ministry of Munitions
- Walter John Wotton, Electrical Dept., H.M. Dockyard, Devonport
- Henry Wright, First Class Surveyor of Taxes, Inland Revenue
- Professor Mark Robinson Wright, Chairman of Whitley and Monkseaton Local Tribunal
- William Wright, Engineer to the Trustees of the Crystal Palace
- William Wright, Y.M.C.A., Sec. for Ireland
- Leonard Graveney Wykes, Sec., Machine Tool Advisory Committee, Ministry of Munitions
- Nora Wynne, Welfare Worker and Head of Munition Workers Hostel, Luton
- David Wilberforce-Young, Inspector, Forestry Branch, Board of Agriculture
- Edward Willie Young, Honorary Sec. and Organiser, County of Middlesex, British Red Cross Society
- George Young, Inspector, Cardiff Special Constabulary
- Patricia Young
- Thomas Young, Executive Ofc. for Food Production, County of Fife
- Walter Youngman, Freight of Stores Section, Ministry of Shipping

For services in connection with the War in France, Egypt and Salonika —

- Capt. Nevill Anderson, Deputy Assistant Adjutant-General, British Expeditionary Force
- Madeleine Beasley, Organiser and Controller of a Canteen, British Expeditionary Force
- Arthur Beeby-Thompson, in charge of Deep Well Boring Park, British Salonika Force
- The Hon. Phyllis Hermione Coke, in charge of Young Men's Christian Association arrangements at 3rd Army Rest Camp
- James Lawrence Hay, Sec., Young Men's Christian Association, New Zealand Division
- Verania MacPhillamy, Assistant Superintendent of the Soldiers' Club and Rest Camp, Kantara Railway Station, Egypt
- William Owens, Supervising Field Sec., Young Men's Christian Association, Egyptian Expeditionary Force
- John William Swithen-bank, Young Men's Christian Association XVIII Corps, British Expeditionary Force

British India

- Lilian Barton
- Deaconess Margaret Durell, lately in charge Soldiers Home, Peshawar and Cherat
- Kate Thubron
- May McCarthy
- Edith Spencer, Nursing Sister, His Highness the Maharaja Somalia's Convalescent Home, Nairobi, East Africa
- Florence Maria Wyld, Principal of the Mahbubia Girls School, Hyderabad
- Herbert Ruben Bird, Manager, Office of Military Sec. to His Excellency the Governor of Madras
- Rao Bahadur Rango Govind Naik, Pleader, Bombay
- Lt. Charles Edward Miller Judge, Indian Army Reserve of Ofc.s, Supply and Transport Corps, Army Headquarters
- Frank Henry Jones, First Engineer of the Cable Steamer Patrick Stewart

Commonwealth of Australia

- Albert Sydney Austin, for services in Australia in connection with the Australian Branch of the British Red Cross Society
- Hugh V. E. Calthrop, for services oversea in connection with the Australian Branch of the British Bed Cross Society
- H. C. Cave, for services oversea in connection with the Australian Branch of the British Red Cross Society
- Ida Florence Dean, for services in Australia in connection with the Australian Branch of the British Red Cross Society
- Frank De Boise, for services oversea in connection with the Australian Branch of the British Red Cross Society
- Thomas Percy Draper, for services in Australia in connection with the Australian Branch of the British Red Cross Society
- Kate Egan, for services in Australia in connection with the Australian Branch of the British Red Cross Society
- E. G. Elworthy, for services oversea in connection with the Australian Branch of the British Red Cross Society
- W. J. Isbister, for services oversea in connection with the Australian Branch of the British Red Cross Society
- Ethel Laidley, for services in Australia in connection with the Australian Branch of the British Red Cross Society
- W. T. Robertson, for services in Australia in connection with the Australian Branch of the British Red Cross Society
- Capt. Robert Albert Dunbar Sinclair, for services oversea in connection with the Australian Branch of the British Red Cross Society
- Lillias Margaret Skene, for services in Australia in connection with the Australian Branch of the British Red Cross Society
- Nancy Consett Stephen, for services in Australia in connection with the Australian Branch of the British Red Cross Society
- Charles A. de Messurier Walker, Honorary Sec., Australian Comforts Fund

Egypt and the Sudan

- Pye Moore, Nursing Sister, Khartoum Civilian Hospital
- Edward Oliver Heywood Fulford, Works Manager, Blue Nile Irrigation
- John Ball Chief Inspector of Geological Survey
- Allen Calder Potts, Works Manager, Sudan Steamers Dept.
- Sydney Dennett, Superintending Engineer, Sudan Posts and Telegraphs Dept.
- John McIntosh, Works Manager, Locomotive Shops, Egyptian State Railways
- George Douglas, Superintendent, Photographic Office, Survey Dept.
- Herbert Mason, Inspector in Veterinary Service of Ministry of Agriculture
- Burton Pearson, Divisional Traffic Superintendent, Egyptian State Railways
- George Burnett Middleton, Mechanical Service, Public Works Dept.
- Henry Wilfrid Skelly, Works Manager, Government Press
- Percy Weaver, Assistant Divisional Traffic Superintendent
- George Boxall, Dockyard Engineer, Port Sudan

Dominion of New Zealand

- Emma Bissland
- Ann Burgess
- Jean Burt
- Sarah Ann Coradine
- Harriette Sophia Crawford
- George Lester Donaldson
- John William Ellis
- Edith Fenton
- Elizabeth Forrester
- Hope Gibbons
- Florence Guinness
- Margaret Harding
- Leah Lucy Hawke
- Douglas William Jack
- Mary Hawkins Kirkpatrick
- Victor John Larner
- Kate Rose Leaver
- Edward George Levinge
- Isabel McLean
- Arthur Edward Manning
- Col. William Henry Sefton Moorhouse, Dominion Sec. of the New Zealand Branch of the British Red Cross Society and Order of St. John of Jerusalem
- Elizabeth Lily Nash
- Arihia Kane Ngata
- George Albert Perry
- Herbert James Duncan Robertson
- Iris Brenda Rolleston
- Alice Georgina Sherratt
- Jean Simpson
- William Wallace Snodgrass
- Belle Spedding
- William Stead
- Maurice Thompson
- Patricia Clay Thomson
- Charles John Treleaven
- Arthur Varney, General Sec., Young Men's Christian Association, New Zealand
- Georgina Webster

Newfoundland

- William Walker Blackall a Superintendent of Education, for services in connection with recruiting
- Vincent Patrick Burke a Superintendent of Education, for services in connection with recruiting
- The Reverend Levi Curtis a Superintendent of Education, for services in connection with recruiting
- Elizabeth Selina Green, for services in connection with the Newfoundland War Contingent Association
- Annie Hayward, for services in connection with the Women's Patriotic Association
- Mary McKay, for services in connection with the Women's Patriotic Association
- Eliza Mary Jane Morris, for services in connection with the Newfoundland War Contingent Association
- Frank Steer, Honorary Sec. of the Imperial Red Cross Fund in Newfoundland

Union of South Africa

- Ezra John Barnett, for services in connection with the South African Railways Rest Room, Johannesburg
- Lucy Dorothea Bourne, of Red Cross and Comforts Committees, Pretoria
- William Beale Calder, for services in connection with the Governor-General's Fund, Durban
- Herbert Ernest Clark, Honorary Sec., Kimberley Committee, GovernorGeneral's Fund
- Francis George Clarkson, Honorary Sec., Grahamstown Committee, Governor-General's Fund
- Paul Dietrich Cluver, Mayor of Stellenbosch
- John Dougall, Honorary Treasurer, Governor-General's Fund
- Robert Dunlop, of the Natal Branch of the Governor-General's Fund
- Eveline Mary Duquemin, for services in connection with the Governor-General's Fund
- John Fairlbairn, Joint Honorary Sec., Bed Cross, South Africa
- Pieter Jacobus van Breda Faure, ex-Mayor of Bloemfontein
- Laura Vivienne Fraser, of the Comforts Committee, De Aar
- Grace Christian Friedlander, President and Hon. Sec. of the South African Work Booms, London
- Constantino William Giovanetti, Mayor of Pretoria
- Alexander Forsyth Girdwood, Port Goods Superintendent, Cape Town
- Willoughiby How, Honorary Sec., Port Elizabeth Local Committee of the Governor-General's Fund
- Edwin Gilbert Izod, South African War Market Committee, Johannesburg
- John Chambers Jemsley, Mayor of Port Elizabeth
- Elizabeth Evelyn Martin, of the Red Cross Committee, Cape Town
- Justina Wilhelrnina Nancy Moller, of the Comforts Committee, Johannesburg
- Susan Ann Murray, of the Red Cross Committee, Bloemfontein
- Maria Nuttall, for services in connection with the Governor-General's Fund, Durban
- John Orr, Mayor of Kimberley
- Mary Jeannette Parker, of the Women's Patriotic League, Pietermaritzburg
- Thomas Samuel Parkyns, for war services on the railways of the South-West Africa Protectorate
- Catherine Mary Bees, Member of War Work Committees, East London
- Frederick Rowland, Joint Honorary Sec., Red Cross, South Africa
- Emma Jane Searle, of the Red Cross Committee, Cape Town
- Thomas Sleith, General Manager, Union Defence Forces Institute
- Richard Walter Stowe, for war services in the South African Railway Workshops, Cape Town
- Percy Henry Taylor, Mayor of Pietermaritzburg
- Arthur Walter Townshend, Chairman, Visiting Troops Entertainment Committee, Cape Town
- Kate Amy van der Bijl, of the Red Cross and Comforts Committees, Cape Town
- Rose Lilian Vintcent, of the South African Comforts Committee, London
- John Henry Weaver, Chief Censor for the Union of South Africa
- Charles Winser, Honorary Sec., Natal Red Cross

Crown Colonies, Protectorates, etc.

- Lt.-Col. Edward Bell, Chief Inspector of Police and Commandant of Local Forces, Leeward Islands
- Marie Bouavia, for services to the sick, wounded and poor in Malta
- Ellen Bowen, for services to War Charities in Barbados
- Ada Ellen Briscoe, local representative in Jamaica of Queen Mary's Needlework Guild
- Robert Randal Bruce, Receiver-General, Harbour Master and Shipping Master, Saint Helena
- John Borlase Cassels, for Red Cross Services in British Guiana
- Harry Hardman Cannell, Honorary Sec., The Oversea Forces Reception Committee
- Marie Clumeck, for services to War Charities in the Straits Settlements
- Frederick Appleton Collymore, for services in connection with the Red Cross Motor Ambulance Fund, Barbados
- Katharine Cook, Matron, Church Missionary Society Hospital, Kampala, Uganda Protectorate
- Emanuel Henry Cummings, Mayor of Freetown, Sierra Leone
- Judith de Cordova, for services in connection with War Charities and recruiting in Jamaica
- Annie Jane Douglas, Matron of the Government Lunatic Asylum, Kingston, Jamaica, for services on behalf of War Charities and recruiting
- Christopher Robert Burroughs Draper, Magistrate and District Comm., Northern Rhodesia
- Matthew McKean Fitzpatrick, Senior Engineer, Marine Dept., Nigeria, for services in connection with the salvage of vessels at Duala
- Harry Kaye Cecil Fisher, of the Eastern Extension, Australasia and China Telegraph Company, for services to the Government of the Straits Settlements
- Capt. Percy Louis Alexander Fraser, Superintendent of Prisons, Trinidad
- Maj. John Morton Fremantle, Resident of Muri, Nigeria, for services in connection with the Cameroon Campaign
- Edward Basil Herbert Goodall, Native Comm., Northern Rhodesia
- Eugene Patrick Griffin, Chief Clerk, Colonial Sec.'s Office, Gibraltar
- John Pierce Hand, Organiser of the "600" Club in aid of returned soldiers, Bermuda Islands
- Robert Oliphant Hutchison, Superintendent of Imports and Exports, Colony of Hong Kong
- Agnes Norah Johnson, Honorary Sec. of the Bahamian Red Cross Guild
- Edgar Anderson Averaye Jones, Magistrate and District Comm., Northern Rhodesia
- Tereza Mary Kearney, Mother Superior, Mill Hill Mission, Uganda Protectorate
- Vrasidas Demitriou Lanitis, Senior Clerk, District Administration, Cyprus
- Lee Choon Guan, for services to War charities in the Straits Settlements
- Elizabeth Ann Lofthouse, for services to War charities in the Bahama Islands
- George Graham Percy Lyons, Magistrate and District Comm., Northern Rhodesia
- Anne Gill Mifsud, Lady Superintendent of the Nursing Division of the St. John's Ambulance Brigade, Malta
- Mary Moseley, Honorary Sec. of the Ladies' Committee in London for the British West Indies Reg.
- Walter Frederick Nutt, of the Straits Trading Company, for services in the Federated Malay States
- Henry Bradshaw Popham, District Political Ofc. in the British Sphere of Occupation in Togoland
- Robert Sutherland Rattray, District Political Ofc. in the British Sphere of Occupation in Togoland
- Maria Jean Reid, Chairman of the Red Cross Committee, Nyasaland
- Arthur Thomas Rivers, Honorary Treasurer of the Oversea Forces Reception Committee
- Herbert St. John Sheppard, Senior Assistant Auditor, Nigeria, for services in connection with the Cameroon Campaign
- Capt. William Blakeney Stanley, First Class District Comm., Sierra Leone
- John James Toogood, Member of the Claims Board; East Africa Protectorate
- Capt. Frederic Thomas George Tremlett, Deputy Inspector-General of Police, Mauritius
- Ada Mary Tucker, for services to the Bermuda Contingents
- Archibald Rhys Usher, Member of the Legislative Council of the Colony of British Honduras and Chairman of the British Honduras Contingent Society
- Gustavus William Webster, Resident of Yola, Nigeria, for services in connection with the Cameroon Campaign
- Capt. Charles Edward Wells, Chairman of the Rhodesia Employment Bureau for returned soldiers
- Thomas Alfred Wood, Member of the Claims Board, East Africa Protectorate

Honorary Members

- Sir Apolo Kagwa KCMG Prime Minister of Buganda
- Edward Sulemani Kahaya, King of Ankole; Andereya Juhaga, King of Bunyoru; and Dandi Kasagama, King of Toro; For services in raising and organising native levies and local Defence Corps, Uganda Protectorate
- Sayyid Ahmed el Morghani, Notable of Kassala
- El Sherif Yusef El Hindi, Notable
- Yacbub Bey Fahmy, Station Superintendent, Cairo Station
- Attilio Nani, Postmaster, Port Said
- Ibraham Bey Dimitri, Sudan Service
