= Henry Fitzmaurice =

British diplomat (1886–1952)

Sir Henry Fitzmaurice KBE CMG
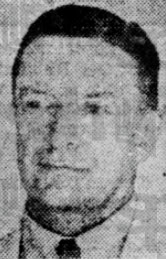
- Fitzmaurice in 1939

British Consul-General Dutch East Indies
- In office 1931–1939

Personal details
- Born: 8 July 1886 Lindfield, Sussex
- Died: 29 January 1952 (aged 65) Kent, England

Sir Henry Fitzmaurice KBE CMG (8 July 1886 – 29 January 1952) was a British diplomat who served in Siam, Indo-China, and Dutch East Indies.

== Early life and education ==
Fitzmaurice was born on 8 July 1886 at Lindfield, Sussex, the son of Richard Fitzmaurice and Alexina Lindsay.

== Career ==
Fitzmaurice entered the Far Eastern Consular Service and was appointed a Student Interpreter in Siam on 9 March 1907, having passed the competitive examination during the previous month. He served in various posts including: Vice-Consul at Bangkok; Vice-Consul at Chiang Mai; Consul at Senggora, and Consul at Medan, Sumatra (1923).

In 1926, he was transferred to Batavia, Dutch East Indies, where he served in the Department of Overseas Trade promoting commerce and providing commercial information while also serving as acting Consul-General (1926–1930). In 1930, he was sent to back to Chiang Mai as Consul-General. In 1931, he returned to Batavia where he served as Consul-General for the whole of the Dutch East Indies, except the province of East Java, and including Dutch Borneo and New Guinea, until his retirement in 1939.

In 1940, he was ordained as a deacon and a priest, and in 1943 became Vicar of Brenchley, Kent.

== Personal life and death ==
Fitzmaurice married Olga Seton-Browne in 1925. They had no children.

Fitzmaurice died on 29 January 1952, aged 65.

== Honours ==
Fitzmaurice was appointed Member of the Order of the British Empire (MBE) in the 1918 New Years Honours. He was appointed Companion of the Order of St Michael and St George (CMG) in the 1934 Birthday Honours. In 1935, he was awarded the King George V Silver Jubilee Medal. He was created a Knight Commander of the Order of the British Empire (KBE) in the 1939 Birthday Honours.
