= Frances Haselden =

New Zealand headmistress

Frances Isabella Haselden (c. 1842 – 9 July 1936) was a New Zealand headmistress. She was born in London, England, in about 1842. She was headmistress of Kauaeranga Girls' School in Thames.
