= Norman Woods =

New Zealand cricketer (1936–2015)

Personal information
- Full name: Norman Thomas Woods
- Born: 19 August 1936; Dunedin, Otago, New Zealand
- Died: 15 July 2015 (aged 78); Balclutha, Otago, New Zealand
- Batting: Left-handed
- Bowling: Left-arm medium
- Role: Bowler

Domestic team information
- Years: Team
- 1958/59–1965/66: Otago
- 1970/71–1973/74: Central Otago

Career statistics
Competition	First-class
Matches	18
Runs scored	148
Batting average	9.86
100s/50s	0/0
Top score	31*
Balls bowled	3,422
Wickets	44
Bowling average	23.77
5 wickets in innings	1
10 wickets in match	0
Best bowling	6/56
Catches/stumpings	10/–
- Source: CricInfo, 4 June 2024

Norman Thomas Woods (19 August 1936 – 15 July 2015) was a New Zealand cricketer. He played 18 first-class matches for Otago between the 1958–59 and 1965–66 seasons.

Woods was born at Dunedin in 1936 and grew up in the Kaikora area of the city. He attended Kaikorai Primary School and Dunedin Technical College and as a schoolboy played for Kaikorai Cricket Club where he was coached by Bert Sutcliffe. A left-arm "trundler" who could move the ball both ways and "cleverly" varied the pace of his bowling, Woods was considered a schoolboy cricketer of "outstanding promise". Initial working as a draper, he completed his compulsory military training before being asked to play in the New Zealand colts trial match in December 1955.

After taking six wickets for South Island colts in the North Island first innings, he was selected for the Colts side's tour of Australia which took place in early 1956. After a "successful" tour and playing for Otago XIs between late 1955 and 1957, and being considered "one of the most successful bowlers in Dunedin senior cricket" during the 1957–58 season, Woods went on to make his first-class debut in December 1958. Once again he took six wickets in the first innings of his representative debut against Canterbury, a performance that Christchurch paper The Press labelled "sensational". He played regularly in the Otago First XI for four seasons, making 16 of his 18 first-class appearances between 1958–59 and 1961–62, including playing against touring English sides in both 1958–59 and 1960–61.

Bowling off of a short run up, Woods "sort of looped the ball over slowly" and got wickets "with guile, flight and deception". His bowling was often described as "slow-medium" paced, although he was sometimes labelled a "spinner". A final two first-class appearances came in 1965–66. In total Woods took 44 wickets in first-class cricket, with the 6/56 he took on debut his only first-class five-wicket haul. He played Hawke Cup cricket for Central Otago in 1970–71 and 1973–74.

Woods worked for Arthur Barnett in Dunedin before moving to Alexandra in Central Otago in 1966 and becoming a travel agent. He produced sports reports for radio station 4ZB and the Otago Daily Times. In later life he and his wife lived on the Otago coast at Kaka Point where they owned a store, camping ground and post office and helped care for the Māori poet Hone Tuwhare.
