= Reg Hart =

New Zealand international rugby league footballer (1936–2019)

Personal information
- Full name: Reginald George Hart
- Born: 5 January 1936
- Died: 18 January 2019 (aged 83); Christchurch, New Zealand

Playing information
- Position: Second-row
Representative
Years	Team	Pld	T	G	FG	P
1961	New Zealand	1	0	0	0	0

Reginald George Hart (5 January 1936 – 18 January 2019) was a New Zealand rugby league footballer. A second-row forward, he was a member of the Kiwis on their 1961–62 tour of Great Britain and France. On that tour, he made eight appearances, including in the test match victory against France in Perpignan.

Hart was born on 5 January 1936, and died in Christchurch on 18 January 2019.
