= John MacGregor (New Zealand politician) =

New Zealand lawyer, politician and writer

John MacGregor (c.1850 – 25 November 1936) was a New Zealand lawyer, politician and writer. He was born in Aberfeldy, Perthshire, Scotland on c.1850. He was appointed to the New Zealand Legislative Council on 15 October 1892 and remained a member for one seven-year term. He was again appointed on 14 July 1914 and was reappointed twice at the end of his seven-year terms, serving until 13 July 1935.

In 1935, MacGregor was awarded the King George V Silver Jubilee Medal.
