= Wilf Haskell =

New Zealand cricketer

Personal information
- Full name: Wilfred John Raymond Haskell
- Born: 12 December 1936 (age 89); Karachi, British India
- Batting: Right-handed
- Bowling: Right-arm medium-fast
- Relatives: Sacha Haskell (daughter)

Domestic team information
- Years: Team
- 1955/56–1968/69: Wellington

Career statistics
Competition	First-class
Matches	16
Runs scored	182
Batting average	13.00
100s/50s	0/0
Top score	35
Balls bowled	2,778
Wickets	40
Bowling average	19.92
5 wickets in innings	1
10 wickets in match	0
Best bowling	6/6
Catches/stumpings	10/–
- Source: CricketArchive, 10 January 2017

Wilfred John Raymond Haskell (born 12 December 1936) is an Indian-born New Zealand former cricketer, schoolteacher and a sports historian.

== Life and career ==
Wilf Haskell was born in Karachi, where his father was a missionary and schoolteacher. In the 1940s the family moved to Nelson, where Wilf attended Nelson College.

An accurate medium-fast bowler, Haskell made his first-class cricket debut for Wellington in 1955–56, but did not establish himself in the team until 1967–68. In the first match of the 1967–68 season, against Otago, he took 6 for 6 off 16 overs to dismiss Otago for 85 in the second innings and give Wellington victory by 149 runs.

He became a schoolteacher, teaching at a number of schools in New Zealand, and finally, from 1980 to 1998, at Wellington College. Since he retired from teaching he has written sports history.

== Books ==
- Seasons of Honour: A Centenary History of New Zealand Hockey 1902–2002 (2002) (with Geoff Watson)
- Faster Stronger Higher: Golden Olympians of New Zealand: Volume I: 1912–1968 (2011)
