= Janet Williamson =

New Zealand nurse (1862–1936)

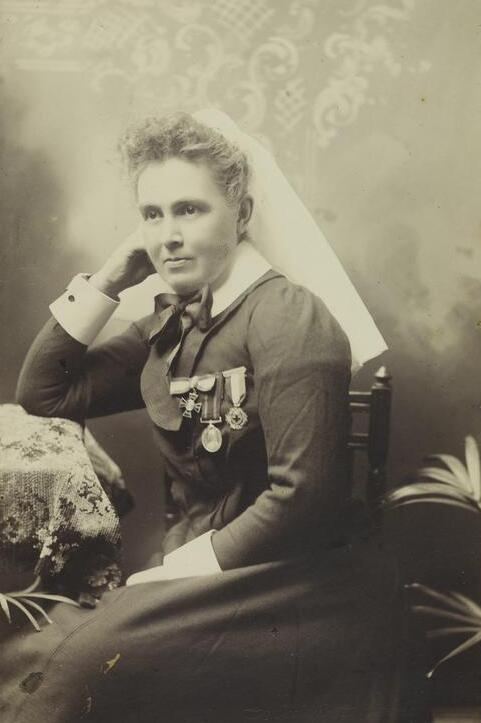
- Portrait of Sister-in-Charge Janet Wyse Mackie Williamson, c.1903
- Born: 26 September 1862; Dunedin, New Zealand
- Died: 12 March 1936 (aged 73); Dunedin, New Zealand
- Occupation: Sister-in-Charge

Janet Wyse Mackie Williamson RRC (26 September 1862 – 12 March 1936) was a nurse from Otago, New Zealand. She served in the Boer War in South Africa and was New Zealand's first recipient of the Royal Red Cross award.

== Early life ==
Williamson was born in Dunedin to Jane Sangster Waters and John Mackie Williamson. Her parents were landowners and her father was an elder in the North Taieri Church. In 1890, Williamson started three years of nursing training at Dunedin Hospital, graduating in 1893.

== Career ==
In 1899 Williamson was one of nine nurses selected from 50 who applied to serve in the Boer War in South Africa. She was appointed Sister-in-Charge of the contingent, which left New Zealand on board the Talune, and arrived in Cape Town on 5 April 1900. The nurses were first sent to Wyneburgh and then to No. 10 General Hospital in Bloemfontein, where Williamson was placed in charge of the hospital. The nurses were stationed there for 17 months. Williamson left South Africa on a troop ship in September 1901.

In 1901, Williamson was awarded the Royal Red Cross, an award for military nursing; it was presented by King Edward VII later that year. She also received the Queen's South Africa Medal.

On her return to New Zealand, Williamson was appointed Matron of Nelson Hospital, but resigned in 1903 due to poor health. She moved back to Dunedin and worked as a private nurse.

In 1907 Williamson was a founding member of the Dunedin Trained Nurses' Club. In 1914 she was invited to meet with the Minister of Defence, James Allen; she did so, and requested that the government establish a Nursing Service for overseas duty.

== Personal life ==
Williamson died in Dunedin on 12 March 1936 and is buried in the Dunedin Southern Cemetery.
