= Denis Pain =

New Zealand jurist and sports administrator (1936–2019)

Judge of the District Court of New Zealand
- In office 1970–1990

Personal details
- Born: Denis Blake Pain; 7 January 1936 Hokitika, New Zealand
- Died: 6 July 2019 (aged 83) Auckland, New Zealand
- Spouse: Elizabeth MacDonald (m. 1961)
- Children: 3

Denis Blake Pain (7 January 1936 – 6 July 2019) was a New Zealand jurist and sports administrator. He was a judge of the District Court from 1970 to 1990, subsequently serving as deputy director of the Serious Fraud Office. In the 1980s and 1990s, he was chef d'équipe of the New Zealand eventing team at four world championships and Olympic Games.

== Early life and family ==
Born in Hokitika on 7 January 1936, Pain was the son of Catherine Mary Pain (née Brown) and Thomas Percival Pain. He was educated at Whangarei Boys' High School, and went on to study law at Auckland University College, graduating LLB in 1959.

On 20 December 1961, Pain married Elizabeth MacDonald, and the couple went on to have three children.

== Legal career ==
After completing his university studies, Pain worked as a barrister and solicitor in Auckland, and was also a part-time law lecturer at the University of Auckland between 1960 and 1970. In 1970, he was called to the bench as a stipendary magistrate of the Magistrates' Court, becoming a judge of the District Court in 1980 when Magistrates' Courts were replaced by District Courts. He sat on the bench in Ōtāhuhu, New Plymouth, Auckland, and Christchurch until 1990 when he was appointed deputy director of the Serious Fraud Office. From 1994, he served as a judge of the High Court of Fiji, before spending five years as a judge in the Sovereign Base areas of Cyprus.

Between 1986 and 1990, Pain was a member of the New Zealand Council of Legal Education.

== Other activities ==
From 1981 to 1987, Pain was a member of the University of Canterbury Council.

Pain served as president of the Taranaki Jockey Club between 1975 and 1978. He was chef d'équipe, or manager, of the New Zealand eventing team at the 1988 and 1992 Summer Olympics, and the 1986 Eventing World Championships and 1990 World Equestrian Games. At those competitions, the New Zealand team won a total of seven medals, including one individual and two team eventing gold medals.

== Awards ==
In 1977, Pain was awarded the Queen Elizabeth II Silver Jubilee Medal, and in 1990 he received the New Zealand 1990 Commemoration Medal.

== Death ==
Pain died in Auckland on 6 July 2019.
