= Murray McEwan =

New Zealand cricketer

Murray Lawson McEwan (20 September 1936 – 4 April 1984) was a New Zealand sportsman who played provincial basketball and cricket.

McEwan was born at Dunedin in Otago in 1936 and educated at Otago Boys' High School in the city. He worked in the banking industry. A left-handed batsman, his only first-class cricket match came in the 1957–58 season in a January 1958 Plunket Shield match against Canterbury. He scored a total of nine runs in the match. Although he did not play again for the Otago team in first-class cricket, played regularly for Southland in 1960–61 and 1961–62, including in the Hawke Cup, and for the Wellington B team between 1964–65 and 1970–71. As well as cricket, he represented Southland at basketball.

McEwan died at Ōtaki in Horowhenua in 1984 at the age of 47. An obituary was published in that year's New Zealand Cricket Almanack.
