= Donald Fuller =

New Zealand cricketer

Personal information
- Full name: Donald McCormick Fuller
- Born: 19 June 1869; Picton, New Zealand
- Died: 10 May 1936 (aged 66); Picton, New Zealand
- Role: Batsman

Domestic team information
- Years: Team
- 1889/90–1894/95: Wellington

Career statistics
Competition	First-class
Matches	12
Runs scored	296
Batting average	16.44
100s/50s	0/1
Top score	56
Balls bowled	66
Wickets	1
Bowling average	33.00
5 wickets in innings	0
10 wickets in match	0
Best bowling	1/24
Catches/stumpings	3/–
- Source: Cricinfo, 1 October 2019

Donald McCormick Fuller (19 June 1869 – 10 May 1936) was a New Zealand cricketer who played first-class cricket for Wellington between 1890 and 1895.

== Life and career ==
Fuller's father, James Fuller, migrated from Ireland in 1855 and settled in Picton, in Marlborough. James Fuller's sisters were the first white women in Picton. In 1862 James Fuller married a Miss McCormick, a member of another family of early settlers in Marlborough. Donald Fuller was one of their nine children.

On his first-class debut in February 1890, Donald Fuller made Wellington's highest score in the match when he scored 42 in the second innings against the touring New South Wales team. In his next match he top-scored in Wellington's first innings with 33 not out against Canterbury on the first day when 32 wickets fell for 242 runs. He made his highest first-class score of 56 against Hawke's Bay in 1892–93, when the next-highest individual score in the match was 37. He was noted for his fast scoring, and was described in 1894 as a "peculiar but most successful batsman" and a fine fieldsman.

Fuller worked for Messrs Thomas Ballinger and Co. Ltd. in Wellington, a metal works and electrical engineering company, from 1884 to 1907, starting as an office boy and working his way up to a directorship. When he left the firm he went into partnership with his brother as a storekeeper in Seddon, in Marlborough.

He married Nellie Fraser in Wellington in July 1896. He had been retired and living in Picton for some years when he died in May 1936, survived by Nellie, a daughter and a son.
