= William Holdship =

English cricketer

William Ernest Johnstone Holdship (15 February 1872 – 14 March 1936) was an English first-class cricketer active 1894 who played for Middlesex. He was born in Auckland, and died in Sydney on 14 March 1936.
