= Avinash Deobhakta =

New Zealand lawyer and jurist

Personal details
- Born: Avinash Ganesh Deobhakta; 24 November 1936 Lahore, Punjab, British Raj
- Died: 2 September 2015 (aged 78) Auckland, New Zealand
- Profession: Lawyer
- Known for: First New Zealand judge of Indian origin

Avinash Ganesh Deobhakta (24 November 1936 – 2 September 2015) was a New Zealand lawyer and jurist. He was the first person of Indian origin to be appointed a District Court judge in New Zealand.

== Biography ==
Born on 24 November 1936 in Lahore (then in British India, now in Pakistan), Deobhakta was educated in London, and then returned to Uganda. A lawyer, he rose to become the principal state attorney in the Ugandan Department of Public Prosecutions, and was later a chief magistrate. Following the expulsion of Asians from Uganda by Idi Amin in 1972, Deobhakta emigrated to New Zealand with his family, and became a naturalised New Zealander in 1978.

Settling in Auckland, Deobhakta practised as a barrister sole until his appointment as a District Court judge in 1982. He was the first judge in New Zealand of Indian origin. He was also chair of the Waikeria District Prisons Board, and in 2002 was appointed to the New Zealand Parole Board as a northern region panel convenor.

In 1990, Deobhakta was awarded the New Zealand 1990 Commemoration Medal. He died in Auckland on 2 September 2015.
