= Oscar Michelsen =

Norwegian missionary

Johan Oscar Michelsen (4 December 1844 – 12 August 1936) was a Norwegian missionary to the New Hebrides (now Vanuatu).

Michelsen emigrated from Norway to New Zealand, where he sold religious literature on the Otago goldfields. He applied to the Synod of Otago and Southland to become a missionary, and was appointed to the island of Tongoa in 1878. He served there until his retirement in 1933.

Michelsen had a little formal education and was known as a good speaker. J. Graham Miller calls him "one of the least educated but most gifted, versatile and warm-hearted" of the pioneer missionaries to Vanuatu.

Michelsen wrote Cannibals Won for Christ (1893) and Misi (1934).

== Family ==
Michelson married Miss Langmuir in 1880.
