= Kenneth Ferries =

Australian cricketer

Personal information
- Born: 7 May 1936; Wyalkatchem, Western Australia
- Died: 25 July 2014 (aged 78); Christchurch, New Zealand
- Batting: Right-handed
- Bowling: Right arm fast medium
- Role: Bowler
- Source: Cricinfo, 13 April 2016

Kenneth Ferries (7 May 1936 – 25 July 2014) was an Australian cricketer. He played first-class cricket for Canterbury and Western Australia between 1961 and 1975.
