= Albert Duder =

New Zealand mariner and harbourmaster

Albert Duder (21 April 1856 – 17 March 1936) was a New Zealand mariner and harbourmaster. He was born in Devonport, Auckland, New Zealand, on 21 April 1856.
