= Archibald Hawke =

New Zealand politician (1862–1936)

The Honourable Archibald Hawke

Member of the New Zealand Legislative Council
- In office 7 May 1918 – 6 May 1932

Personal details
- Born: Archibald Fotheringham Hawke; 1862 Stirling, Port Augusta, South Australia
- Died: 27 September 1936 (aged 73–74) Invercargill, New Zealand
- Resting place: Eastern Cemetery, Invercargill
- Spouse: Leah Lucy Hawke
- Profession: Businessman

Archibald Fotheringham Hawke (1862 – 27 September 1936) was a businessman from Invercargill, and a member of the New Zealand Legislative Council from 1918 to 1932.

== Early life and business interests ==
Hawke was born in Stirling, Port Augusta, South Australia in 1862. His father was the owner of a station. At Port Augusta, he attended a private school. The family emigrated to Invercargill when Hawke was ten. He received his schooling at Invercargill Grammar School followed by Henry's private school. After his schooling, he started with the merchants Calder, Blacklock and Co. When that company was sold, Hawke went to the stock and station agents Martin and Maitland. After a year, that business sold out to the National Mortgage and Agency Company of New Zealand (NMA) in May 1878. He stayed with that company for 40 years and after having worked in Invercargill, Christchurch (as accountant), and Dunedin (as sales agent), he returned to Invercargill in 1890 as the branch manager. The company existed until 1972, when it merged with Wright Stephenson.

Hawke was an inaugural member of the Starr-Bowkett Building Societies, and was involved with the Permanent Investment Society. He was a large shareholder of Southland's largest company, the milk condensing plant of Murrays Ltd.

== Sports ==
Hawke was active both as a sportsman and administrator. He played rugby union with the Invercargill club, cricket with the Invercargill Cricket Club, was a member of the rifle club (including the local champion for one year), and rowed with the Invercargill Rowing Club. He was vice-president and president of the rifle club. Hawke and others helped establish rugby grounds including Rugby Park Stadium. Hawke was elected as the second president of the New Zealand Rugby Union. He was an administrator for the Southland Cricket Association (including president), the Invercargill Rowing Club (including president), the Invercargill Football Club (including president), and the Invercargill Cycling Club.

== Politics ==
Hawke lived in Gladstone, which was initially a separate borough. Hawke was a member of the Waihopai School committee, and served on the borough council for 14 years, for most of that time as mayor. He was one of the proponents of Greater Invercargill and the amalgamation was proceeded with. Beyond Gladstone, Hawke was at times a member of the Invercargill high schools board, the Bluff Harbour Board (including chairman for three years), the Hospital Board (including chairman for over ten years), the Charitable Aid Board (with all seven years as chairman). He was president for one term of the A&P (Agricultural and Pastoral) Association, and president of the local chamber of commerce.

He was a member of the Legislative Council from 7 May 1918 to 6 May 1925; then 7 May 1925 to 6 May 1932, when his term ended. He was appointed by the Reform Government.

== Family and death ==
The Hawke family's main residence was in Gladstone and they had a second house in Queenstown.

Hawke died on 27 September 1936 at his Gladstone residence. His wife had died four years earlier, and he was survived by two sons and three daughters. He and his wife are buried at Invercargill's Eastern Cemetery.
