= Tahupōtiki Haddon =

Robert Tahupōtiki Haddon (5 October 1866 – 5 November 1936) was a New Zealand Methodist minister. Of Māori descent, he identified with the Ngāti Ruanui iwi. He was born in the Hokianga, New Zealand, on 5 October 1866.
