= List of Central Districts representative cricketers =

List of cricketers

This is a list of all cricketers who have played first-class, List A or Twenty20 cricket for the Central Districts cricket team in New Zealand. Seasons given are first and last seasons; the player did not necessarily play in all the intervening seasons.

As of 4 November 2025

== A ==
- Denis Aberhart, 1976/77–1982/83
- Alistair Alcock, 1992/93–1996/97
- Robert Anderson, 1977/78–1981/82
- Tim Anderson, 1998/99–2002/03
- Bryan Andrews, 1966/67–1969/70
- Tyler Annand, 2024/25
- Doug Armstrong, 1958/59
- Dean Askew, 1991/92–1994/95
- Alec Astle, 1973/74–1978/79
- Colin Atkinson, 1975/76–1981/82
- Craig Auckram, 1989/90–1996/97
- Eric Austin, 1995/96–1996/97
- Ma'ara Ave, 2018/19–2022/23

== B ==
- Roald Badenhorst, 2011/12–2013/14
- Murray Baker, 1966/67–1971/72
- Paul Baker, 1988/89
- Bruce Baldwin, 1973/74
- Scott Baldwin, 2006/07
- Trevor Barber, 1959/60
- Colin Barclay, 1955/56
- Brady Barnett, 2011/12
- Geoff Barnett, 2004/05–2007/08
- Craig Bartlett, 1996/97
- Gary Bartlett, 1958/59–1969/70
- Don Beard, 1950/51–1960/61
- Gary Beer, 1963/64–1964/65
- Don Beuth, 1968/69
- Peter Blackbourn, 1983/84
- Ian Blackwell, 2010/11
- Tony Blain, 1982/83–1994/95
- Bob Blair, 1955/56
- David Blake, 1993/94–1998/99
- Peter Bloomfield, 1957/58–1958/59
- Peter Borren, 2011/12
- Graham Botting, 1950/51–1952/53
- Douglas Bowden, 1950/51–1957/58
- Jack Boyle, 2022/23–2024/25
- Brendon Bracewell, 1977/78–1979/80
- Doug Bracewell, 2008/09–2023/24
- Douglas Bracewell, 1976/77–1979/80
- Mark Bracewell, 1979/80
- Don Brian, 1953/54–1955/56
- Scott Briasco, 1982/83–1991/92
- Michael Brooke, 1971/72
- Murray Brown, 1973/74–1974/75
- Ron Brown, 1952/53–1957/58
- Rodney Brown, 1988/89–1998/99
- Tom Bruce, 2014/15–2025/26
- Graham Buist, 1956/57–1957/58
- Carl Bulfin, 1996/97–1997/98
- Wayne Burtt, 1973/74–1974/75

== C ==
- Carl Cachopa, 2010/11–2013/14
- Lance Cairns, 1972/73–1975/76
- David Calkin, 1969/70
- Marc Calkin, 2008/09
- Sam Cassidy, 2024/25
- Harry Cave, 1950/51–1958/59
- Duncan Cederman, 2004/05
- Rex Challies, 1951/52–1954/55
- Murray Chapple, 1950/51–1965/66
- Ian Ching, 1950/51–1955/56
- Will Clark, 2021/22–2025/26
- Josh Clarkson, 2015/16–2025/26
- Mitchell Claydon, 2015/16
- Dane Cleaver, 2010/11–2025/26
- Don Cleverley, 1952/53
- Josh Cobb, 2013/14
- Richard Collinge, 1963/64–1969/70
- Ian Colquhoun, 1953/54–1963/64
- Bevan Congdon, 1960/61–1970/71
- David Cooper, 1993/94–1996/97
- Peter Coutts, 1958/59–1972/73
- Richard Cox, 1975/76
- Carl Crafar, 1986/87
- Emmett Craik, 1999/00
- Arthur Cresswell, 1950/51–1951/52
- Fen Cresswell, 1950/51–1954/55
- Martin Crowe, 1983/84–1989/90
- Chris Cruikshank, 2006/07
- Don Currie, 1959/60–1962/63

== D ==
- James de Terte, 2007/08–2011/12
- Brendon Diamanti, 2003/04–2010/11
- Barry Dineen, 1962/63–1963/64
- Graham Douglas, 1965/66–1967/68
- Mark Douglas, 1987/88–2000/01
- Les Downes, 1975/76
- Terence Dravitzki, 1962/63
- Liam Dudding, 2015/16–2023/24
- Stu Duff, 1985/86–1995/96
- Graham Duncan, 1971/72
- Percy Dyhrberg, 1951/52

== E ==
- Jock Edwards, 1973/74–1984/85
- Richard Ellis, 1971/72–1977/78
- Jarrod Englefield, 1998/99–2005/06

== F ==
- Luke Feldman, 2016/17
- Joey Field, 2020/21–2024/25
- Craig Findlay, 1995/96–1999/00
- Toby Findlay, 2022/23–2025/26
- Dean Finlay, 1988/89
- Eric Fisher, 1954/55
- Ian Fisher, 1989/90–1990/91
- Dean Foxcroft, 2018/19–2025/26
- Dave Fulton, 1993/94
- Blair Furlong, 1963/64–1973/74
- Campbell Furlong, 1994/95–2006/07
- John Furlong, 1990/91–1993/94

== G ==
- Craig Garner, 1992/93–1996/97
- Charles Garrod, 1966/67
- Caleb Gaylard, 2013/14
- Roy Gearry, 1969/70–1970/71
- Paul Gibbs, 1990/91–1991/92
- Michael Gill, 1974/75–1981/82
- Stephen Gill, 1981/82–1987/88
- Ross Glover, 1985/86–1991/92
- Matthew Goodson, 1989/90
- Mark Greatbatch, 1986/87–1999/00
- Wayne Greenstreet, 1973/74
- Bevan Griggs, 2000/01–2010/11
- David Guthardt, 1985/86–1988/89
- John Guy, 1953/54–1962/63

== H ==
- Gerald Haddon, 1969/70
- Bruce Hamilton, 1953/54
- Lance Hamilton, 1996/97–2006/07
- Barry Hampton, 1961/62–1968/69
- Ian Hampton, 1962/63–1965/66
- Richard Harden, 1987/88–1990/91
- Noel Harford, 1953/54–1958/59
- Jack Harris, 2024/25
- Greg Hart, 1994/95
- Ron Hart, 1982/83–1990/91
- David Hartshorn, 1993/94
- Brian Hastings, 1960/61
- Greg Hay, 2006/07–2023/24
- Richard Hayward, 1982/83–1985/86
- Curtis Heaphy, 2022/23–2025/26
- Brent Hefford, 1999/00–2008/09
- Greg Hegglun, 2004/05–2007/08
- John Henderson, 1960/61
- Joseph Hill, 1999/00–2000/01
- Tony Hill, 1975/76–1976/77
- Wayne Hodgson, 1979/80–1981/82
- Peter Holland, 1976/77–1977/78
- Stefan Hook-Sporry, 2019/20
- Terry Horne, 1977/78–1979/80
- Julian Houghton, 1953/54
- Jamie How, 2000/01–2014/15
- John Howell, 1966/67–1972/73
- Llorne Howell, 1994/95–1996/97
- Mason Hughes, 2021/22
- Allan Hunter, 1951/52–1955/56
- Ray Hutchison, 1975/76

== I ==
- Craig Ingham, 1990/91–1995/96
- Peter Ingram, 2001/02–2011/12

== J ==
- Murray Jamieson, 1980/81–1982/83
- Kyle Jarvis, 2011/12–2012/13
- Mahela Jayawardene, 2015/16–2016/17
- Brett Johnson, 2022/23
- Andrew Jones, 1979/80–1995/96
- Barrie Jones, 1954/55
- Jim Jones, 1954/55–1956/57
- Alistar Jordan, 1968/69–1979/80

== K ==
- Marty Kain, 2011/12–2016/17
- Dennis Kay, 1974/75–1977/78
- David Kelly, 1998/99–2001/02
- Robert Kelly, 1961/62
- Richard King, 2001/02
- David Kinsella, 1961/62–1965/66
- David Kivell, 1952/53–1955/56
- Jeremy Kuru, 2009/10–2010/11

== L ==
- David Lamason, 1990/91–1996/97
- Andrew Lamb, 2012/13
- Mark Lane, 1993/94
- Gary Langridge, 1976/77–1981/82
- Ian Leggat, 1950/51–1961/62
- Jayden Lennox, 2019/20–2025/26
- David Leonard, 1989/90–1993/94
- Christian Leopard, 2015/16–2021/22
- Warren Linn, 1981/82
- Gregory Logan, 1986/87–1989/90
- Greg Loveridge, 1994/95–2002/03
- Graeme Lowans, 1959/60–1964/65
- Paul Lowes, 1990/91
- Willem Ludick, 2017/18–2019/20
- Tim Lythe, 2007/08

== M ==
- Mitchell McClenaghan, 2007/08–2010/11
- Ryan McCone, 2016/17–2018/19
- Peter McGlashan, 1999/00–2001/02
- Peter McGregor, 1969/70
- Alexander McGuire, 1957/58
- Evon McInnis, 2007/08
- Jarrod McKay, 2019/20
- Terry McKenna, 1987/88–1989/90
- Donald MacLeod, 1956/57–1966/67
- Richard McLeod, 1990/91
- Gavin McRae, 1992/93–1995/96
- Ervin McSweeney, 1979/80–1980/81
- Colin McVicar, 1950/51–1951/52
- Kervin Marc, 1999/00
- Wayne Martin, 1984/85–1987/88
- Michael Mason, 1997/98–2011/12
- Andrew Mathieson, 2012/13–2016/17
- Paul Maunder, 1961/62
- David Meiring, 2013/14–2014/15
- Ted Meuli, 1950/51–1959/60
- Lawrie Miller, 1950/51–1952/53
- Adam Milne, 2009/10–2021/22
- Glenn Milnes, 1997/98–1999/00
- Amit Mishra, 2008/09
- Haydn Morgan, 2000/01
- Douglas Morland, 1973/74
- John Morrison, 1965/66–1966/67
- Ernest Mummery, 1961/62
- Warren Murdock, 1962/63–1974/75
- Tony Murphy, 1985/86
- Felix Murray, 2017/18–2018/19
- Luke Murray, 2007/08

== N ==
- Graham Napier, 2009/10–2011/12
- David Neal, 1971/72–1976/77
- John Nelson, 2001/02
- Tarun Nethula, 2010/11–2013/14
- Philip Newman, 1958/59
- Andrew Niblett, 2006/07
- Kieran Noema-Barnett, 2008/09–2020/21

== O ==
- Karl O'Dowda, 1988/89
- John Ogilvie, 1994/95–1995/96
- Joe Ongley, 1950/51–1951/52
- Jacob Oram, 1997/98–2013/14
- Ross Ormiston, 1975/76–1977/78
- David O'Sullivan, 1972/73–1984/85

== P ==
- Desmond Park, 1957/58
- Ajaz Patel, 2012/13–2025/26
- Min Patel, 2005/06
- Navin Patel, 2015/16–2018/19
- Andrew Paterson, 1973/74
- Brad Patton, 2006/07–2010/11
- Jason Pawley, 1994/95–1995/96
- Michael Pawson, 1990/91–1995/96
- Dermot Payton, 1965/66–1976/77
- Andrew Penn, 1994/95–1999/00
- Roger Pierce, 1971/72–1984/85
- Vic Pollard, 1964/65–1968/69

== R ==
- Seth Rance, 2008/09–2022/23
- Brett Randell, 2022/23–2024/25
- Jeet Raval, 2012/13
- Dominic Rayner, 2006/07
- Lawrence Reade, 1958/59–1962/63
- Tom Reaney, 1950/51
- Mitch Renwick, 2015/16–2017/18
- Herbert Rice, 1950/51
- Kurt Richards, 2007/08–2015/16
- Dave Richardson, 1984/85
- Gary Robertson, 1979/80–1989/90
- Stephen Robertson, 1985/86–1990/91
- Taraia Robin, 1999/00–2000/01
- Dean Robinson, 2011/12–2015/16
- Gerald Rose, 1958/59
- Gordon Rowe, 1952/53
- Ian Rutherford, 1977/78
- Maurice Ryan, 1967/68–1969/70
- Jesse Ryder, 2002/03–2017/18

== S ==
- Henry Sampson, 1970/71–1972/73
- Ian Sandbrook, 2002/03
- Angus Schaw, 2022/23–2024/25
- Robbie Schaw, 2006/07–2008/09
- Brad Schmulian, 2017/18–2025/26
- Robin Schofield, 1959/60–1974/75
- Andrew Schwass, 1998/99–2004/05
- Richard Scragg, 2001/02
- Tim Selwood, 1972/73
- Indika Senaratne, 2015/16
- Richard Sherlock, 2003/04–2008/09
- Anthony Short, 1978/79–1979/80
- Mike Shrimpton, 1961/62–1979/80
- Martyn Sigley, 1994/95–2002/03
- Sanjeewa Silva, 2000/01 (Note: Silva played three matches for Central Districts in 2000–01 and three for Auckland the following season. He had previously played both first-class and List A cricket in his native Sri Lanka. He was born at Colombo in 1970 and played primarily as a medium-paced bowler.)
- Rex Simpson, 1955/56–1957/58
- Mathew Sinclair, 1995/96–2012/13
- Anthony Small, 1955/56
- Bevan Small, 2010/11–2023/24
- Richard Small, 1958/59–1962/63
- Glen Smidt, 1986/87
- Steven Smidt, 2011/12–2014/15
- Ben F Smith, 2000/01–2001/02
- Ben S Smith, 2010/11–2023/24
- Campbell Smith, 1983/84–1990/91
- Ian Smith, 1977/78–1986/87
- Keith Smith, 1955/56–1960/61
- Ian Snook, 1972/73–1987/88
- Lindsay Sparks, 1967/68–1970/71
- Craig Spearman, 1996/97–2004/05
- David Spence, 1955/56–1961/62
- Bruce Stewart, 1972/73
- Raymond Stewart, 1974/75
- Derek Stirling, 1981/82–1987/88
- Ben Stoyanoff, 2019/20
- Glen Sulzberger, 1995/96–2004/05

== T ==
- Michael Taiaroa, 2007/08
- David Tarrant, 1954/55–1957/58
- Ross Taylor, 2002/03–2022/23
- Mattie Thomas, 2014/15
- Roderick Thomas, 1975/76–1977/78
- Ewen Thompson, 2000/01–2009/10
- Blair Tickner, 2014/15–2025/26
- Greg Todd, 2000/01–2011/12
- Raymond Toole, 2019/20–2025/26
- Matthew Toynbee, 1977/78–1984/85
- Carl Trask, 1999/00
- Peter Trego, 2012/13–2013/14
- Maurice Tremlett, 1951/52
- Bruce Turner, 1951/52–1955/56
- Roger Twose, 1991/92–1993/94

== U ==
- Paul Unwin, 1986/87–1992/93

== V ==
- Kruger van Wyk, 2010/11–2015/16
- Peter Verhoek, 1978/79–1980/81
- John Vernon, 1961/62
- Murali Vijay, 2008/09
- Peter Visser, 1983/84–1986/87

== W ==
- Ken Wadsworth, 1968/69–1971/72
- Matthew Walker, 1995/96–1997/98
- Gary Walton, 1985/86–1987/88
- Ryan Watson, 2019/20
- Christopher Webb, 1981/82
- Gareth West, 2000/01
- Regan West, 1996/97–2004/05
- Tim Weston, 2005/06–2010/11
- Ben Wheeler, 2009/10–2021/22
- Ian Wheeler, 1974/75
- Paul Whitaker, 1995/96
- Craig White, 1999/00
- Kevin White, 1979/80
- Bayley Wiggins, 2018/19–2023/24
- Daniel Wightman, 2011/12
- Richard Wilde, 1951/52
- Brent Williams, 1996/97 (Note: Williams played one match for Central Districts in the 1996/97 season.)
- Michael Wilson, 1959/60
- Simon Wilson, 1990/91–1993/94
- John Wiltshire, 1981/82–1983/84
- Warren Wisneski, 1992/93–1995/96
- Richard Wixon, 1991/92–1992/93
- George Worker, 2007/08–2020/21
- Robert Wylie, 1973/74

== Y ==
- Michael Yardy, 2010/11
- Will Young, 2011/12–2025/26
- Bryan Yuile, 1959/60–1971/72
