= Netherlands cricket team in New Zealand in 1992–93 =

The Netherlands national cricket team toured New Zealand in December 1992 and played eight matches against teams representing various regions of New Zealand. The Dutch team was captained by Steven Lubbers.

== Matches ==
4 December 1992
Scorecard

Netherlands; 182/5 (45 overs)	v	Northland; 172/9 (45 overs)
Nolan Clarke 57; Alex Tait 2/13 (7 overs)		Craig Rika 30; Roland Lefebvre 4/26 (10 overs)

Netherlands won by 10 runs
Cobham Oval, Whangārei
Umpires: Ross Murdoch (NZ) and John Nilsson (NZ)

- Netherlands won the toss and decided to bat
- The match was reduced to 45 overs per side

6 December 1992

Netherlands; 65 (21.2 overs)	v	Auckland second XI; 66/3 (23.3 overs)
Rupert Gomes 18; Blair Hendren 6/14 (10 overs)		Martin Pringle 18*

Auckland second XI won by 7 wickets
Melville Park, Auckland

- Auckland second XI won the toss and decided to field

The second game of the tour was against the Auckland Second XI at Melville Park, Auckland on 6 December 1992. The Auckland Second XI won by 7 wickets. On a damp, low bouncing, pitch the Dutch team were sent in to bat. Scoring was low with Rupert Gomes scoring 18 and Peter Cantrell adding 16. Blair Hendren, a 19-year old medium pacer, took 6 wickets for 14 runs (4 of which were wides) off 10 overs, including 5 maidens. Matthew O'Rourke supported taking 2 wickets for 25 runs. Auckland second XI took their time with their run chase, batting for longer than the Dutch team had, before reaching their target for the loss of only 3 wickets. Martin Pringle top scored with 18 not out, B. Chiplin 17 and Andrew Reinholds scored 15.

8 December 1992
Scorecard

Northern Districts; 195/9 (50 overs)	v	Netherlands; 196/4 (45.1 overs)
Alex Tait 44; Andre van Troost 3/31 (10 overs)		Peter Cantrell 99*; David Blake 2/27 (10 overs)

Netherlands won by 6 wickets
Trust Bank Park, Hamilton
Umpires: Adrian Keown (NZ) and Tom McCall (NZ)

- Northern Districts won the toss and decided to bat

10 December 1992
Scorecard

Wellington	v	Netherlands

Match abandoned
Basin Reserve, Wellington

- No toss
- No play was possible due to rain.

12 December 1992
Scorecard

Netherlands; 223/5 (50 overs)	v	Nelson; 102/5 (31 overs)
Roland Lefebvre 64*; J Higgins 2/40 (10 overs)		Gavin McRae 63*; Steven Lubbers 3/25 (10 overs)

Netherlands won on faster scoring rate
Memorial Park, Motueka
Umpires: Barry Blommaart (NZ) and Paul Anderson (NZ)

- Netherlands won the toss and decided to bat
- Play was halted when Nelson needed to have scored 139 runs to win

December 1992
Scorecard

Netherlands; 252/5 (50 overs)	v	Marlborough and Nelson; 206/9 (50 overs)
Rupert Gomes 71; Mike Burns 3/51 (10 overs)		Campbell Smith 47; Patrick Groeneveld 2/39 (10 overs)

Netherlands won by 46 runs
Trafalgar Park, Nelson
Umpires: Barry Blommaart (NZ) and Errol Millar (NZ)

- Netherlands won the toss and decided to bat

15 December 1992
Scorecard

Netherlands; 233/5 (50 overs)	v	Canterbury; 224/5 (50 overs)
Peter Cantrell 76; Mark Hastings 2/34 (8 overs)		Llorne Howell 65; Floris Jansen 2/29 (10 overs)

Netherlands won by 9 runs
Lancaster Park, Christchurch

- Netherlands won the toss and decided to bat

16 December 1992
Scorecard

Netherlands; 234/4 (45 overs)	v	South Canterbury; 173/8 (45 overs)
Peter Cantrell 91; Craig Cumming 2/24 (5 overs)		R Drake 32; Nolan Clarke 4/55 (9 overs)

Netherlands won by 61 runs
Aorangi Oval, Timaru
Umpires: Mike Smith (NZ) and Geoff Talbot (NZ)

- Netherlands won the toss and decided to bat
- The match was reduced to 45 overs per side
