= Monk McFay =

Nathaniel Jack "Monk" McFay (June 27, 1908, Wichita Falls, Texas – October 22 or 23, 1994, Los Angeles) was an American jazz drummer and bandleader, known especially for leading jazz bands in Hawaii.

McFay was working as a bellhop in Amarillo, Texas, when he was asked by Roderick Thomas to substitute on drums in the house band; he played with Thomas's territory band until 1934, also doing a short stint with Red Williams during that time. In 1934 he played in Oklahoma City with the Spotlight Entertainer Orchestra, the band led by Joe Brantley. In 1935 he relocated to Los Angeles and played with Bernard Banks, who took his band to the Casino Ballroom in Honolulu. He led his own band at the Casa Loma Ballroom in 1936, then returned to Oklahoma City to play in the Spotlight band again, now under the leadership of Leonard Chadwick. In 1937 he toured Honolulu with his own band again, and returned to Oklahoma City a third time in 1938 to play with Leslie Sheffield's band. From 1939 to 1941 he once more played in Honolulu with a band which included Henry Coker; he left Hawaii due to legal troubles. Following this he played with Harlan Leonard in 1945 and then joined Buddy Banks's band, where he recorded for the first time. He played with Banks until 1949.
