= Netherlands cricket team in New Zealand in 1987–88 =

The Netherlands national cricket team toured New Zealand in March 1988 and played two matches against teams representing various regions of New Zealand. The touring Dutch team was captained by Peter Entrop.

== Matches ==
25 March 1988
Scorecard

Netherlands; 224/5 (50 overs)	v	MD Crowe's XI; 195 (46 overs)
Steven Lubbers 53; Paul Unwin 2/38 (10 overs)		Derek Stirling 63; Diederik Visée 3/23 (10 overs)

Netherlands won by 29 runs
Cooks Gardens, Wanganui
Umpires: Bill Sutton (NZ) and Bob Pitcairn (NZ)

- Netherlands won the toss and decided to bat

27 March 1988
Scorecard

Central Districts; 257/8 (50 overs)	v	Netherlands; 179 (46.5 overs)
Mark Douglas 77; Floris Jansen 2/48 (9 overs)		Roland Lefebvre 78; Gary Robertson 5/12 (8.5 overs)

Central Districts won by 78 runs
Trafalgar Park, Nelson

- Central Districts won the toss and decided to bat
