= Barrie Jones =

Barrie Jones may refer to:

- Barrie Jones (footballer) (born 1941), Welsh footballer
- Barrie Jones (cricketer) (1929–2011), New Zealand cricketer
- Barrie R. Jones (1921–2009), British-New Zealand ophthalmologist and ophthalmic surgeon
- Barrie Jones (photographer), Vancouver-based photography artist

== See also ==
- Barry Jones (disambiguation)
