= David Cooper =

David Cooper may refer to:

== Sports ==
- David Cooper (Indian cricketer) (born 1923)
- Dave Cooper (rugby league) (fl. 1960s–1970s), Australian rugby league player
- Davie Cooper (1956–1995), Scottish footballer
- David Cooper (equestrian) (born 1970), Australian Olympic equestrian
- David Cooper (New Zealand cricketer) (born 1972)
- David Cooper (ice hockey) (born 1973), Canadian ice hockey player
- David Cooper (basketball) (born 1976), Australian basketball player
- David Cooper (baseball) (born 1987), American baseball player

== Other people ==
- David Cooper (abolitionist) (1725–1795), Quaker anti-slavery pamphleteer
- David Cooper (jurist) (1821–c. 1873). American lawyer and jurist
- David Cooper (psychiatrist) (1931–1986), South African anti-psychiatrist
- David E. Cooper (born 1942), British philosopher
- David Cooper (chaplain) (born 1944), British Army chaplain, Eton master and international shooter
- David Anthony Cooper (1949–2008), English cathedral organist
- David Cooper (immunologist) (1949–2018), Australian immunologist and HIV/AIDS researcher
- Dave Cooper (born 1957), Canadian cartoonist, commercial illustrator and graphic designer
- David J. Cooper (fl. 1970–2010s), professor of accounting
- David Cooper (RAF officer) (fl. 1980s–2010s), British air marshal
- Davie Cooper (trade unionist) (1939–2024), Scottish trade unionist
- David Cooper, half of the singing duo Otis & Shug

== See also ==
- David Couper Thomson (1861–1954), proprietor of D. C. Thomson & Co. Ltd
