= Rodney Brown =

Rodney Brown may refer to:

- Rodney Brown (athlete) (born 1993), American discus thrower
- Rodney Brown (cricketer) (born 1968), New Zealand cricketer
- Rodney Brown (equestrian) (born 1948), Australian Olympic equestrian
- Rodney W. Brown (born 1951), American producer of local and national television
