= David Leonard =

David Leonard may refer to:

- David Leonard (record producer), audio producer
- David Leonard (cricketer) (born 1965), New Zealand cricketer
- David Leonard (singer), a Christian musician in the band All Sons & Daughters
