= Stephen Gill =

Stephen Gill may refer to:

- Stephen Gill (cricketer) (born 1957), New Zealand cricketer
- Stephen Gill (photographer) (born 1971), British photographer and artist
- Stephen Gill (political scientist) (born 1950), professor of political science at York University, Toronto, Canada
- Stephen Gill (lawyer) (born 1968), American lawyer
- Steve Gill (born 1956), American conservative talk radio host
- Steve Gill (footballer) (1896–1977), Australian rules footballer
- Steve Gill (Big Brother)
- Steve Gill, an American clandestine chemist
