= Sigley =

Sigley is a surname. Notable people with the surname include:

- Ernie Sigley (1938–2021), Australian television host, radio presenter and singer
- Marjorie Lynette Sigley (1928–1997), English artist, writer, actress, teacher, choreographer, theatre director and television producer
- Martyn Sigley
