= Andrew Paterson =

Andrew Paterson may refer to:

- Banjo Paterson (Andrew Barton Paterson, 1864–1941), Australian bush poet
- Andrew J. Paterson (born 1952), Canadian artist
- Andy Paterson, British film producer
- Andrew Paterson (cricketer) (born 1947), New Zealand cricketer
- Andrew Paterson (photographer) (1877–1948), Scottish photographer

== See also ==
- Andrew Patterson (disambiguation)
- Andrew Pattison (born 1949), Rhodesian tennis player
