= Richard Small =

Richard Small may refer to:

- Richard Small (horse trainer) (1945–2014), American horse racing trainer
- Richard H. Small (born 1935), American scientist in the field of electroacoustics
- Richard Small (cricketer) (born 1938), New Zealand cricketer
