= Imant Raminsh =

Canadian composer of Latvian descent (born 1943)

Imant K Raminsh CM OBC
- Born: Imants Kārlis Ramiņš; 18 September 1943 (age 82); Ventspils, Reichskommissariat Ostland, Nazi Germany (now Latvia)
- Occupation: Composer

Imant Karlis Raminsh CM OBC (Latvian: Imants Kārlis Ramiņš, born 18 September 1943) is a Canadian composer of Latvian descent, best known for his choral compositions. He resides in Coldstream, British Columbia.

== Early life and education ==
Born in Ventspils, Latvia, he came to Canada in 1948 and became a naturalized citizen in 1954. He completed an ARCT (Associate of The Royal Conservatory of Music) diploma in violin at the Royal Conservatory of Music in Toronto, Ontario, Canada where he was a pupil of Albert Pratz. He then earned a Bachelor of Music degree from the University of Toronto, where he studied with Elmer Iseler. He then spent two years at the Universität Mozarteum in Salzburg, Austria, during which he studied composition, fugue, violin and conducting.

== Career ==
During his studies in Salzburg, Raminsh played in the professional Camerata Academica orchestra. He established the music department at the College of New Caledonia in British Columbia and was also the founding conductor of the New Caledonia Chamber Orchestra.

In 1991, Raminsh's choral work "Magnificat" was performed by the Toronto Mendelssohn Choir at Roy Thomson Hall. At that time he was the principal violinist in the Okanagan symphony orchestra, and had also founded the Youth Symphony of the Okanagan and the Aura Chamber Choir.

He is a two-time winner of the biennial Canadian National Choral Awards in the category of "Outstanding Choral Work", first in 1990 for his Magnificat and again in 1994 for his Veni Sancte Spiritus. He held the position of principal second violin in the Okanagan Symphony Orchestra (OSO). He also conducted the Okanagan Youth Symphony Orchestra for a number of years.

In 2018, Raminsh was made a Member of Order of Canada for his contributions and achievements as a Canadian musician, conductor and composer. In 2024, Raminsh was made a Member of the Order of British Columbia.

== Discography ==
- Simple Gifts (1991) – "A Northwest Trilogy". Vancouver Chamber Choir, Jon Washburn (conductor). CBC Records – SMCD 5097
- Love Songs for a Small Planet (1994) – "In the Night we Shall Go", "Psalm 121", and "Smile, O Voluptuous Cool-breath'd Earth". CBC Vancouver Orchestra, Vancouver Chamber Choir, soloists Ian Hampton and Linda Lee Thomas, Jon Washburn (conductor). Centrediscs – CMCCD 4893
- Songs of the Lights (2000) – "Songs of the Lights". Toronto Children's Chorus, Ruth Watson Henderson and Jean Ashworth Bartle (conductors). Marquis Classics – ERAD 253
- Choral Concert (2000) – "Ave Verum Corpus".
- Songs of the Lights (2001). CBC Vancouver Orchestra, soloist Sandra Graham, Jon Washburn (conductor). CBC Records – SMCD 5116
- Earth Chants (2002). Vancouver Chamber Choir, CBC Vancouver Orchestra, Jon Washburn (conductor). CBC Records – SMCD 5219
- Child with the Starry Crayon (2004) – "Deux chansons". Oriana Singers, William Brown (conductor). Independent – VA 2004-1
- Blessed is the World that Sings (2005) – "Ave Verum Corpus". Cantilon Chamber Choir, Heather Johnson (conductor). Arktos Recordings – ARK 200586
- The Nightingale (2005) – "The Nightingale". Glen Ellyn Children's Chorus, Kurt Ollmann et al.
- Introduction to Canadian Music (2006) – "Ave Verum Corpus". Vancouver Chamber Choir. Naxos – NAXOS 855017
- Canadian classical music
