= Crafar =

Crafar is a surname. Notable people with the surname include:

- Carl Crafar (born 1964), New Zealand cricketer
- Simon Crafar (born 1969), Grand Prix motorcycle road racer from New Zealand

== See also ==
- Crafar Farms, dairy business in New Zealand
