= Eric Austin =

Eric Austin may refer to:

- Eric Austin (cricketer) (born 1974), New Zealand cricketer
- Eric E. Austin (born c. 1969), United States Marine Corps general
- Eric Austin (American football) (born 1973), American football defensive back
