= Scott Baldwin (disambiguation) =

Scott Baldwin may refer to:

- Scott Baldwin, fictional character from the soap opera General Hospital
- Scott Baldwin (cricketer) (born 1983), New Zealand cricketer
- Scott Baldwin (politician), American politician
- Scott Baldwin (rugby union) (born 1988), Welch rugby coach and rugby union player
- Scott Baldwin (American football), American football player for the 1989 Nebraska Cornhuskers football team
- Scott Baldwin (drummer), member of The Rubens
