= Paul Unwin =

Paul Unwin may refer to:

- Paul Unwin (cricketer) (born 1967), New Zealand cricketer
- Paul Unwin (director) (born 1957), UK-based film and television director
