= Stephen Robertson =

Stephen Robertson may refer to:

- Stephen Robertson (computer scientist), British computer scientist
- Stephen Robertson (cricketer) (born 1963), New Zealand cricketer
- Stephen Robertson (footballer) (born 1977), Scottish football goalkeeper
- Stephen Robertson (politician) (born 1962), Australian politician

== See also ==
- Steven Robertson (born 1970), Scottish actor
- Steve Robertson (disambiguation)
- Robertson Stephens, investment bank
