= Campbell Smith =

Campbell Smith may refer to:

- Campbell Smith (cricketer) (born 1960), New Zealand cricketer
- Campbell Smith (playwright) (1925–2015), New Zealand playwright, poet and wood engraver
