= Peter Bloomfield =

Peter Bloomfield may refer to:

- Peter Bloomfield (cricketer) (1936–2025)
- Peter Bloomfield (statistician)
