= David Neal =

David Neal may refer to:

- Dave Neal, American sportscaster
- David Neal (actor) (1932–2000), British actor
- David Neal (British Army officer) Independent Chief Inspector of Borders and Immigration (UK)
- David Neal (cricketer) (born 1951), New Zealand cricketer
- David Dalhoff Neal (1838–1915), American artist
- David Neal, American weathercaster and assistant to chief meteorologist Mark Prater on WIAT
