= Joseph Hill =

Joseph Hill may refer to:

- Joseph Hill (lexicographer) (1625–1707), English clergyman, academic and lexicographer
- Joseph Hill (violin maker) (1715–1784), British violin maker
- Joseph Adna Hill (1860–1938), American statistician
- Joseph Morrison Hill (1864–1950), American judge
- J. Lister Hill (Joseph Lister Hill, 1894–1984), American politician
- Joseph H. Hill (1858–1927), American educator
- Joseph Hill (musician) (1949–2006), Jamaican vocalist and songwriter
- Joseph Hill (cricketer) (born 1976), New Zealand cricketer
- Joseph Hill, fictional character on the TV series Blue Bloods

== See also ==
- Joe Hill (disambiguation)
- Hill (surname)
