= Brad Patton =

Brad Patton may refer to:

- Brad Patton (cricketer)
- Brad Patton (actor)
