= John Vernon (disambiguation) =

John Vernon (1932–2005) was a Canadian actor.

John or Jackie Vernon may also refer to:

- John Vernon (of Clontarf) (c. 1618–1670), Quartermaster-General to Oliver Cromwell
- John Vernon (athlete) (1929–2019), Australian high jumper
- John Vernon (Australian actor) (1848–1921), aka Howard Vernon (Australian actor)
- Jackie Vernon (footballer) (1918–1981), former Irish footballer
- Jackie Vernon (comedian) (1924–1987), American stand-up comedian, actor and voice artist
- John Vernon (English cricketer) (1922–1994), English cricketer and Royal Navy officer
- John Vernon (New Zealand cricketer) (1940-2005), New Zealand cricketer
