= Cederman =

Cederman is an Anglicized form of the Jewish surname Zajderman. Notable people with the surname include:

- Duncan Cederman (born 1978), New Zealand cricketer
- Lars-Erik Cederman (born 1963), Swiss-Swedish political scientist and professor
- Sharyn Kay Cederman (1948–2000), New Zealand-born feminist and banker
