= Dean Finlay =

New Zealand cricketer (born 1965)

Personal information
- Born: 7 May 1965 (age 61); Palmerston North, New Zealand
- Source: Cricinfo, 29 October 2020

Dean Finlay (born 7 May 1965) is a New Zealand cricketer. He played in one first-class match for Central Districts in 1988/89.

== See also ==
- List of Central Districts representative cricketers
