= Alistair Alcock =

New Zealand cricketer (born 1972)

Personal information
- Born: 20 July 1972 (age 54); Napier, New Zealand
- Source: Cricinfo, 29 October 2020

Alistair Alcock (born 20 July 1972) is a New Zealand cricketer. He played in 9 first-class and 31 List A matches for Central Districts from 1992 to 1997.

== See also ==
- List of Central Districts representative cricketers
