= John Henderson (cricketer) =

New Zealand cricketer (1928–2019)

Personal information
- Full name: John Duncan Henderson
- Born: 8 August 1928; Hastings, New Zealand
- Died: 26 January 2019 (aged 90); Hastings, New Zealand
- Source: Cricinfo, 29 October 2020

John Duncan Henderson (8 August 1928 – 26 January 2019) was a New Zealand cricketer. He played in three first-class matches for Central Districts in 1960/61.

Henderson died in Hastings on 26 January 2019, at the age of 90.

== See also ==
- List of Central Districts representative cricketers
