= Graham Duncan (cricketer) =

New Zealand cricketer (born 1947)

Personal information
- Born: 1 December 1947 (age 78); New Plymouth, New Zealand
- Source: Cricinfo, 29 October 2020

Graham Duncan (born 1 December 1947) is a New Zealand cricketer. He played in one first-class match for Central Districts in 1971/72.

== See also ==
- List of Central Districts representative cricketers
