= Peter Blackbourn =

New Zealand cricketer (born 1957)

Personal information
- Born: 4 April 1957 (age 69); Inglewood, New Zealand
- Source: Cricinfo, 29 October 2020

Peter Blackbourn (born 4 April 1957) is a New Zealand cricketer. He played in three first-class matches for Central Districts in 1983/84.

== See also ==
- List of Central Districts representative cricketers
