= Terry McKenna =

New Zealand cricketer (born 1964)

Personal information
- Born: 30 April 1964 (age 62); Lower Hutt, New Zealand
- Source: Cricinfo, 29 October 2020

Terry McKenna (born 30 April 1964) is a New Zealand cricketer. He played in twelve first-class and five List A matches for Central Districts from 1987 to 1990.

== See also ==
- List of Central Districts representative cricketers
