= Michael Pawson =

New Zealand cricketer (born 1969)

Personal information
- Born: 13 January 1969 (age 57); Masterton, New Zealand
- Source: Cricinfo, 29 October 2020

Michael Pawson (born 13 January 1969) is a New Zealand cricketer. He played in 19 first-class and 35 List A matches for Central Districts from 1990 to 1996.

== See also ==
- List of Central Districts representative cricketers
