= Anthony Short =

New Zealand cricketer

Personal information
- Full name: Anthony Warren Short
- Born: 2 January 1953 (age 73); Whangārei, New Zealand
- Batting: Right-handed
- Bowling: Right-arm medium
- Role: Batsman

Domestic team information
- Years: Team
- 1978/79–1979/80: Central Districts
- FC debut: 30 December 1978 Central Districts v Auckland
- Last FC: 12 January 1980 Central Districts v Northern Districts
- Only LA: 25 November 1979 Central Districts v Northern Districts

Career statistics
Competition	First-class	List A
Matches	3	1
Runs scored	96	2
Batting average	19.20	2.00
100s/50s	0/0	0/0
Top score	33	2
Balls bowled	64	7
Wickets	0	0
Bowling average	–	–
5 wickets in innings	–	–
10 wickets in match	–	–
Best bowling	–	–
Catches/stumpings	4/–	0/–
- Source: CricketArchive, 5 June 2009

Anthony Warren Short (born 2 January 1953) is a former New Zealand cricketer who played three first class cricket matches and a single one day match for Central Districts between 1978 and 1980. A right-handed batsman, he struggled at first-class level, scoring only 96 runs from five innings – largely in a career-best knock of 33. He did, however, enjoy greater success as an all-rounder in District Cricket's Hawke Cup for Wairarapa, and as a bowler for Central District's under-23 team. He was also a very occasional right-arm medium bowler, who sent down a tidy yet wicket-less 64 balls.

== Career ==
Short was born in January 1953 in Whangārei in Northland. He played for Wairarapa in the Hawke Cup between 1970 and 1988. His achievements in the Hawke Cup of 1970/71 saw enough success to win him a place in the Central District's Under-23 team, for whom he played three matches, taking consecutive five-wicket-hauls. His efforts at this level earned him selection for his first match on 30 December 1978, having scored 75 and 105 against Nelson at the end of January, and 127 against Hutt Valley on 25 February. In his first match for the Central District Stags, against Auckland, he took a catch to dismiss John Wiltshire for 40 as Auckland reached 284. Opening the batting, Short's 20 was overshadowed by Test batsman Robert Anderson's 127; Central District closing their innings at 285/6 with a one-run lead. Short then took two further catches and bowled three economical – yet wicket-less – overs for four runs, and scored 15 as the match ended in a draw.

Short returned to Wairarapa to score 60 and 99 against Poverty Bay at the end of January 1979, and returned to Central Districts to face Otago in the final of the 1978/79 Shell Trophy. Otago, thanks largely to a knock of 222 by Ian Rutherford, scored 543/8 declared. Short, batting at six, scored 33 of the Stags' 275. Following on, only three runs were scored by the undefeated openers before the match ended as a draw. He returned again to the Hawke Club prior to making his one-day debut against Northern Districts at Hamilton on 25 November 1979. He batted at seven, and was stumped for two as Central Districts collapsed to an eight-wicket defeat.

Short returned for the final time to the Central Districts team to face Northern Districts in the 1979/1980 Shell Trophy, on 12 January 1980. Batting at six once more, he scored 13 and 15 as Northern Districts took a close-one wicket victory. Short continued to play for Wairarapa in the next few years, including a match on 10 January 1981, where he took three wickets for 64 runs and scored a century. His final match, against Southland, took place in February 1988.
