= John Howell (cricketer) =

New Zealand cricketer

Personal information
- Born: 17 June 1943; Waipawa, New Zealand
- Died: 10 November 2010 (aged 67)
- Source: Cricinfo, 29 October 2020

John Howell (17 June 1943 – 10 November 2010) was a New Zealand cricketer. He played in 34 first-class and 5 List A matches for Central Districts from 1966 to 1973.

== See also ==
- List of Central Districts representative cricketers
