= Douglas Morland =

New Zealand cricketer

Personal information
- Born: 8 February 1944; Palmerston North, New Zealand
- Died: 4 September 2016 (aged 72); Takapuna, New Zealand
- Source: Cricinfo, 29 October 2020

Douglas Morland (8 February 1944 – 4 September 2016) was a New Zealand cricketer. He played in one List A and six first-class matches for Central Districts from 1965 to 1974.

== See also ==
- List of Central Districts representative cricketers
