= Evan Gray =

New Zealand cricketer (born 1954)

Personal information
- Full name: Evan John Gray
- Born: 18 November 1954 (age 71); Wellington, New Zealand
- Batting: Right-handed
- Bowling: Slow left-arm orthodox
- Role: Bowler, Umpire

International information
- National side: New Zealand (1983–1988)
- Test debut (cap 152): 11 August 1983 v England
- Last Test: 12 November 1988 v India
- ODI debut (cap 48): 4 November 1984 v Sri Lanka
- Last ODI: 15 December 1988 v India

Career statistics
Competition	Test	ODI	FC	LA
Matches	10	10	162	68
Runs scored	248	98	5,472	861
Batting average	15.50	16.33	28.80	20.02
100s/50s	0/1	0/0	6/28	0/3
Top score	50	38	128*	53
Balls bowled	2,076	386	31,220	1,726
Wickets	17	8	444	76
Bowling average	52.11	35.75	28.20	22.71
5 wickets in innings	0	0	16	0
10 wickets in match	0	0	3	0
Best bowling	3/73	2/26	8/37	4/27
Catches/stumpings	6/–	3/–	138/–	27/–
- Source: Cricinfo, 4 February 2017

Evan John Gray (born 18 November 1954) is a former New Zealand cricketer, who played 10 Tests and 10 One Day Internationals for New Zealand in the 1980s.

He was selected as an all rounder, with 17 wickets at a bowling average of 52.11. In 1981–82 he and Ross Ormiston added 226 for Wellington against Central Districts. He is also the only player in the country's history to score more than 4000 runs and capture over 350 wickets for his province.

Gray later served as a first-class umpire, officiating in 24 first-class matches in New Zealand and two in South Africa between 2005–06 and 2010–11.
