= David Calkin =

New Zealand cricketer (born 1945)

Personal information
- Born: 1 March 1945 (age 81); Palmerston North, New Zealand
- Source: Cricinfo, 29 October 2020

David Calkin (born 1 March 1945) is a New Zealand cricketer. He played in four first-class matches for Central Districts in 1969/70.

== See also ==
- List of Central Districts representative cricketers
