= Terence Dravitzki =

New Zealand cricketer (born 1940)

Personal information
- Born: 11 February 1940 (age 86); New Plymouth, New Zealand
- Source: Cricinfo, 29 October 2020

Terence Dravitzki (born 11 February 1940) is a New Zealand cricketer. He played in one first-class match for Central Districts in 1962/63.

== See also ==
- List of Central Districts representative cricketers
