= David Lamason =

New Zealand cricketer (born 1971)

Personal information
- Born: 23 April 1971 (age 55); Whanganui, New Zealand
- Source: Cricinfo, 29 October 2020

David Lamason (born 23 April 1971) is a New Zealand cricketer. He played in 5 first-class and 22 List A matches for Central Districts from 1990 to 1997.

== See also ==
- List of Central Districts representative cricketers
