= John Nelson (New Zealand cricketer) =

New Zealand cricketer (born 1975)

Personal information
- Born: 3 May 1975 (age 51); Blenheim, New Zealand
- Source: Cricinfo, 29 October 2020

John Nelson (born 3 May 1975) is a New Zealand cricketer. He played in two List A matches for Central Districts in 2001/02.

== See also ==
- List of Central Districts representative cricketers
