= David Guthardt =

New Zealand cricketer (born 1958)

Personal information
- Born: 24 October 1958 (age 68); Nelson, New Zealand
- Source: Cricinfo, 29 October 2020

David Guthardt (born 24 October 1958) is a New Zealand cricketer. He played in ten first-class and ten List A matches for Central Districts from 1985 to 1989.

== See also ==
- List of Central Districts representative cricketers
