= Rodney W. Brown =

American television producer

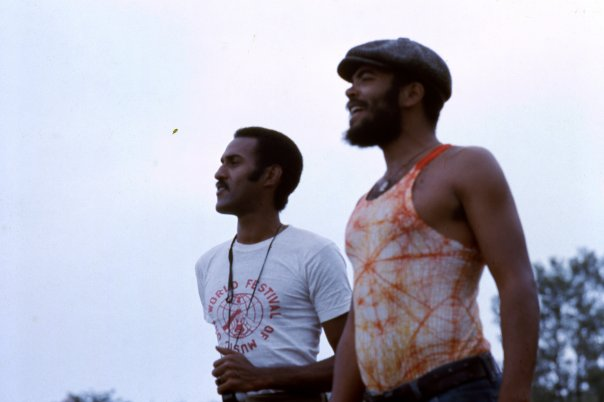
Rodney W. Brown, with friend Wilfred Williams, working on "One Night's Run"

Rodney W. Brown is a producer of local and national television. He was part of an African-American artistic renaissance in Washington, D.C., during the mid- to late 1970s that included Allan C Barnes, Wilfred Williams, Gary Price, Johnny Malone, Leon C. Collins and others.

== Biography ==
=== Early years and personal life ===
Born and raised in Washington, D.C., Brown was a published poet at the age of 11. He was one of the first selections to the “ABC: A Better Chance” program at Dartmouth College, where he transitioned to attending Mount Hermon School for Boys on scholarship. While there, he was an honor roll student who won eight varsity letters and was voted first team All New England in football, as well as first team All-Academic Honors. He was accepted at Stanford University, where he enrolled. It was the last year of Stanford's freshman athletic teams and he won the title Most Improved Player as he graduated to the varsity team. He returned to school after 30 years and captured three Masters of Arts degrees from the University of Michigan in education, American culture, and English language and literature. He is now a professor of humanities and fine arts at Mott Community College.

=== Production career ===
After Stanford, Rodney received a fellowship in creative writing from the University of Massachusetts Amherst. He wrote the novel I Must've Stepped on the Monkey Block, published by The New Day Group. Soon after, he sold his first feature-length screenplay, Bianca. That was followed with two independent productions that he wrote, produced, and directed. The first was Spotlight on Sports, a highlight show that featured an exclusive interview with heavyweight champion Muhammad Ali Next was the made-for-TV special One Nights Run in 1977, starring Le Tari and Sheila Renee Johns.

The film was co-written by Fred Johnson. Other notables on their first dramatic production were Leon C. Collins, Gary Price and 2 time Oscar-winner Russell Williams. This film was released worldwide through the American Forces Network.

Brown transitioned to short-form content as he moved from hands-on film production and editing to video. Brown was writer, producer, and director of WHMM and WNET 's Small Business Magazine television series, which aired across the country on PBS. The project, for HUSBDC, the Howard University Small Business Development Center, was a thirteen-part series dedicated to inspiring people to start and maintain their own small businesses. Throughout this time, he continued to put together small-scale projects with big-name support. He produced the United Way of America's Federal Campaign film starring Leslie Nielsen. He produced commercial spots with boxing icon Sugar Ray Leonard and heavyweight champion Riddick Bowe.

In 1999, Brown moved to Michigan and became senior executive producer at WFUM TV-28, the University of Michigan's PBS station. While there, he took the station to a new level in terms of local programming, creating over 300 production hours per year worth of material, up scores from previous years. He created new programs and revamped old, evident in the Homepage series. Brown took the original show format, a weekly newsmagazine, and spun it off into Homepage: Afterhours, a show that focused on bringing local music acts to a larger audience. Afterhours won several Emmys, and received widespread syndication across Michigan and the region. He also put together the one-hour special Jazzland, displaying local jazz talent, to coincide with the Ken Burns series Jazz. Using the students of the University of Michigan-Flint in ways that challenged them, he trained and brought into the business dozens of graduates. After leaving WFUM, he returned to the world of independent production, creating several new series and specials. MotorTown Music Central picked up where Afterhours left off, showcasing local artists for viewers across the region and Canada. He also put together a one-hour special, Blues Detroit Style, placing an emphasis that the Detroit area has had on the development of the blues. He is currently a producer with iMichigan Productions. His projects have included The Michigan Experience, spotlighting Michigan's involvement in the American Civil War and American Jazz Greats, a series serving as a tribute to classic jazz and fabled players. Other award winning projects are " Cleveland Summitt II: Get The Guys Together Again", "Missing Piece", "Left Behind in Vietnam", "A Tribute to Dick Purtan", "Capitol Memories","(AB) Allan Barnes", and "Umoja" He is currently Executive Producer for iMichigan Productions.

== Awards and honors ==
22 Nominations for Regional Emmys. 10 MI-NATAS Emmy Wins. 1 CENTRAL GREAT LAKES Emmy win 7 Telly Award Wins. 1 Eclipse Award Winner.
