= Steve Robertson =

Steve Robertson may refer to:

- Steve Robertson (actor), of Scotland the What? fame
- Steve Robertson (racing driver) (born 1964), English racing driver

== See also ==
- Stephen Robertson (disambiguation)
- Steven Robertson (born 1970), Scottish actor
