= Richard Wilde (cricketer) =

New Zealand cricketer

Personal information
- Born: 28 October 1926; Ōtaki, New Zealand
- Died: 11 August 2000 (aged 73); Feilding, New Zealand
- Source: Cricinfo, 29 October 2020

Richard Wilde (28 October 1926 – 11 August 2000) was a New Zealand cricketer. He played in two first-class matches for Central Districts in 1951/52.

== See also ==
- List of Central Districts representative cricketers
