= Desmond Park =

New Zealand cricketer (1936–2019)

Personal information
- Born: 1 April 1936; Inglewood, New Zealand
- Died: 14 October 2019 (aged 83); Stratford, New Zealand
- Source: Cricinfo, 29 October 2020

Desmond Park (1 April 1936 – 14 October 2019) was a New Zealand cricketer. He played in three first-class matches for Central Districts in 1957/58.

== See also ==
- List of Central Districts representative cricketers
