= Ian Wheeler =

New Zealand cricketer (born 1949)

Personal information
- Born: 30 April 1949 (age 77); Hamilton, New Zealand
- Source: Cricinfo, 29 October 2020

Ian Wheeler (born 30 April 1949) is a New Zealand cricketer. He played in one List A match for Central Districts in 1974/75.

== See also ==
- List of Central Districts representative cricketers
