= Wayne Martin (cricketer, born 1953) =

New Zealand cricketer (1953–2026)

Personal information
- Full name: Kenneth Wayne Martin
- Born: 28 April 1953; New Plymouth, New Zealand
- Died: 4 August 2026 (aged 73); Mangorei, New Zealand
- Source: Cricinfo, 29 October 2020

Kenneth Wayne Martin (28 April 1953 – 4 August 2026) was a New Zealand cricketer. He played in 16 first-class and 19 List A matches for Central Districts from 1984 to 1988.

Martin died at Mangorei, on the outskirts of New Plymouth, on 4 August 2026, at the age of 73.

== See also ==
- List of Central Districts representative cricketers
