= Stu Duff =

New Zealand cricketer (born 1962)

Personal information
- Full name: Stuart William Duff
- Born: 14 December 1962 (age 63); Hastings, New Zealand
- Source: Cricinfo, 29 October 2020

Stu Duff (born 14 December 1962) is a New Zealand cricketer. He played in 88 first-class and 78 List A matches for Central Districts from 1985 to 1996.

Duff is also an amateur golfer. In April 2019, he won the maiden North Island Seniors title at the Ngamotu Golf Club, with a 12-stroke victory. In 2026 he shot his age with a 62.

== See also ==
- List of Central Districts representative cricketers
