= Raymond Stewart (New Zealand cricketer) =

New Zealand cricketer

Ray Stewart
Personal information
- Full name: Raymond Darrell Stewart
- Born: 15 November 1944 (age 81); Dunedin, Otago, New Zealand
- Batting: Right-handed
- Bowling: Right-arm medium

Domestic team information
- Years: Team
- 1963/64–1968/69: Otago
- 1972/73–1977/78: Horowhenua
- 1974/75: Central Districts
- Source: CricInfo, 25 May 2016

Raymond Darrell Stewart (born 15 November 1944) is a New Zealand former cricketer. He played first-class cricket for Otago between the 1963–64 and 1968–69 seasons and for Central Districts during the 1974–75 season. He also played representative rugby union for the Otago Rugby Football Union.

Stewart was born at Dunedin in Otago in 1944, the son of a restaurateur in the city. A club cricketer for Albion Cricket Club in the city, Stewart played age-group matches for Otago from 1960 to 1961 before making his senior representative debut for the provincial side in January 1964. Later that season he played a first-class match for a New Zealand under-23 side. He made five more first-class appearances for Otago, two during 1965–66 and three in 1968–69.

After qualifying as a dentist, Stewart moved to Levin in Horowhenua on the North Island. He played Hawke Cup cricket for Horowhenua between 1972–73 and 1977–78 as well as appearing in three first-class matches for Central Districts during the 1974–75 season. In a total of 10 first-class matches he scored 205 runs, with his highest score of 63 coming for Central Districts against Northern Districts in January 1975. This was his only first-class half-century.
