= Jeremy Kuru =

New Zealand cricketer (born 1985)

Personal information
- Born: 17 February 1985 (age 41); Napier, New Zealand
- Source: Cricinfo, 29 October 2020

Jeremy Kuru (born 17 February 1985) is a New Zealand cricketer. He played in six first-class matches for Central Districts from 2009 to 2011.

== See also ==
- List of Central Districts representative cricketers
