= Michael Brooke =

New Zealand cricketer (born 1952)

Personal information
- Born: 29 November 1952 (age 73); Wellington, New Zealand
- Source: Cricinfo, 29 October 2020

Michael Brooke (born 29 November 1952) is a New Zealand cricketer. He played in one List A match for Central Districts in 1971/72.

== See also ==
- List of Central Districts representative cricketers
