= Rex Simpson =

New Zealand cricketer

Personal information
- Born: 18 November 1925; New Plymouth, New Zealand
- Died: 15 September 2017 (aged 91); Havelock North, New Zealand
- Source: Cricinfo, 29 October 2020

Rex Simpson (18 November 1925 – 15 September 2017) was a New Zealand cricketer. He played in three first-class matches for Central Districts in 1955/56.

== See also ==
- List of Central Districts representative cricketers
