= Bruce Stewart (cricketer) =

New Zealand cricketer (born 1949)

Personal information
- Full name: Bruce Alexander Stewart
- Born: 10 September 1949 (age 77); Masterton, New Zealand
- Source: Cricinfo, 29 October 2020

Bruce Alexander Stewart (born 10 September 1949) is a New Zealand cricketer. He played in two first-class and two List A matches for Central Districts in 1972/73.

== See also ==
- List of Central Districts representative cricketers
