= Campbell Furlong =

New Zealand cricketer

Personal information
- Full name: Campbell James Marie Furlong
- Born: 16 June 1974 (age 52); Napier, New Zealand
- Batting: Right-handed
- Bowling: Right arm offbreak
- Relatives: Blair Furlong (father); John Furlong (brother)

Domestic team information
- Years: Team
- 1992/93–2006/07: Hawke's Bay
- 1994/95–2006/07: Central Districts

Career statistics
Competition	FC	LA	T20
Matches	42	75	2
Runs scored	933	743	1
Batting average	17.94	21.22	1.00
100s/50s	0/3	0/1	0/0
Top score	88	62*	1
Balls bowled	8245	3611	42
Wickets	92	70	2
Bowling average	44.60	35.37	29.00
5 wickets in innings	1	0	0
10 wickets in match	0	0	0
Best bowling	7/72	4/9	1/18
Catches/stumpings	53/–	30/–	1/–
- Source: ESPNcricinfo, 30 December 2022

Campbell James Marie Furlong (born 16 June 1974) is a former New Zealand cricketer who played first-class cricket for Central Districts Stags and Hawke Cup cricket for Hawke's Bay. He was born in Napier. His father is former All Black, Blair Furlong.

== Playing career ==
Furlong toured Pakistan with the New Zealand under-19 cricket team in January and February 1994, playing in three under-19 tests and three under-19 one-day internationals against the Pakistan under-19 side. In the three tests, he scored 65 runs with the bat at an average of 16.25 and a high score of 44, and took 10 wickets at 22.40 with best bowling figures of 5/94. In the three ODIs, he made 20 runs at an average of 6.66 with a high score of 13, and took one wicket with an average of 92.00 and best bowling of 1/35.

An off-spin bowler and a middle-order batsman, Furlong made his debut for Central Districts in the 1994/95 season. He played six seasons for Central Districts up to the 1999/2000 season, making 35 first-class appearances. He recorded his best first-class bowling figures of 7/72 against Northern Districts at Trafalgar Park, Nelson, in the 1996/97 season.

Furlong then spent 18 months living in London on his overseas experience, where he did not play any cricket and worked in the banking sector. After returning to New Zealand in 2001, he settled in New Plymouth, where his partner found work as a primary school teacher, and he joined the New Plymouth Marist United Cricket Club. He was quickly named as captain of the Taranaki cricket team, and then captained Central Districts in a Cricket Max competition in November 2001. He went on to play seven first-class matches for Central Districts in the 2001/02 season, his last in first-class cricket, and achieved his highest first-class score of 88 with the bat. Across seven first-class seasons, he scored 933 runs at an average of 17.94, took 92 wickets at an average of 44.60, and took 53 catches.

Furlong continued to play one-day cricket for Central Districts until the 2003/04 season, before retiring, but made a comeback in the 2006/07 season when he was again contracted by Central Districts. In that season, he made eight appearances in List-A (one-day) matches and played two Twenty20 games for Central Districts, before once again retiring. In all, he played 75 List-A matches for Central Districts between 1994/95 and 2006/07.

== Post-playing career ==
Furlong served on the board of the Central Districts Cricket Association from 2011 to 2016, including a few months as chair between June and November 2016.

After beginning work in banking, Furlong became an accountant, and is now a partner in PricewaterhouseCoopers' Hawke's Bay office.
