= Paul Baker (cricketer) =

New Zealand cricketer (born 1968)

Personal information
- Full name: Paul John Mark Baker
- Born: August 19, 1968 (age 58); Hawera, Taranaki
- Batting: Right-handed
- Bowling: Legbreak
- Source: Cricinfo, 26 June 2023

Paul Baker (born 19 August 1968) is a New Zealand cricketer. He played in one first-class match for the Central Districts in 1988/89.

== See also ==
- List of Central Districts representative cricketers
