= Blair Furlong =

New Zealand sportsman

Blair Furlong QSM
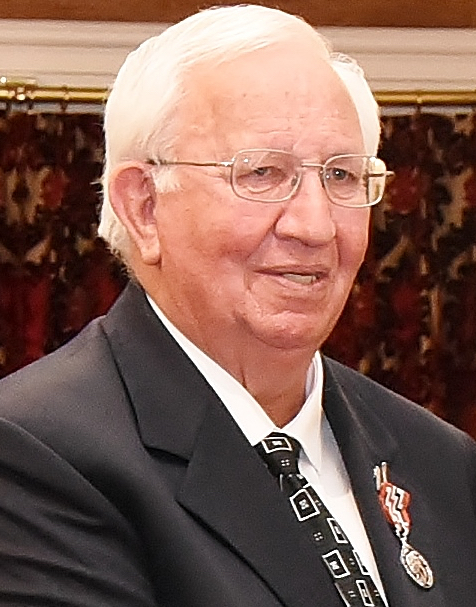
- Furlong in 2016
- Born: Blair Donald Marie Furlong; 10 March 1945 (age 81) Dannevirke, New Zealand
- Height: 1.83 m (6 ft 0 in)
- Weight: 89 kg (196 lb)
- School: Dannevirke High School
- Notable relatives: Campbell Furlong (son); John Furlong (son)

Rugby union career
- Position(s): First five-eighth Halfback
Provincial / State sides
Years	Team	Apps	(Points)
1963–1971	Hawke's Bay	77	
International career
Years	Team	Apps	(Points)
1970	New Zealand	1	(0)
- Cricket career

Cricket information
- Batting: Left-handed
- Bowling: Right-arm offbreak

Domestic team information
- Years: Team
- 1963/64–1973/74: Central Districts

Career statistics
Competition	First-class	List A
Matches	15	3
Runs scored	246	24
Batting average	12.94	24.00
100s/50s	0/0	0/0
Top score	49	20*
Balls bowled	2,477	120
Wickets	26	0
Bowling average	35.42
5 wickets in innings	1
10 wickets in match	0
Best bowling	6/115
Catches/stumpings	10/–	1/–
- Source: Cricinfo, 31 October 2020

Blair Donald Marie Furlong QSM (born 10 March 1945) is a former New Zealand cricketer and rugby union player.

== Career ==
=== Rugby ===
At just 18, one year out of Dannevirke High School, Furlong played for Hawke's Bay in their midweek match against the touring 1963 England side. It was an immensely strong Bay side at the time and the game against England was comfortably won.

In the next three seasons Furlong, 1.83m and nearly 90 kg, briefly played for Wellington B in 1966 and Bay of Plenty early in 1967 Furlong midway through the 1967 season began what was the most effective period of his rugby career. This was as the first five in the Bay's golden Ranfurly Shield era which lasted until 1969.

Furlong became one of the Bay's mainstays in retaining the shield when Wellington strongly challenged at the end of the 1967 season. Furlong, who in 1963 had missed a late dropped goal against Auckland which would have meant an historic win, this time dropped the goal which gave the Bay a 12-all draw. Furlong is of Ngāti Porou and Ngāi Tahu descent. This plus his solid form for the Bay in 1967–69 made him a contender for the All Black side to tour South Africa in 1970.

Furlong played well in his two trials, one at first five eighths and the other at fullback, and his record for the Bay made him a worthy selection. On the hard grounds of South Africa Furlong sometimes struggled but he played in 11 of the tour matches, nine at first five and two at fullback, and gained his cap in the fourth test of the series. A competent kicker, he contributed 32 points from 10 conversions, three penalties and a dropped goal.

He had another trial in 1971 but was not considered for that year's series against the Lions. His tactical nous was recognised, though, with his appointment as the Bay captain in 1971. He played 12 matches for the Bay in what was his farewell season, including that against the Lions, to bring his total for the union to 77.

Furlong later coached and administered at Hawke's Bay union level.

=== Cricket ===
An off-spin bowler, Furlong played first-class cricket from 1964 to 1973 with Central Districts. In March 1965 he achieved a hat-trick for New Zealand under-23 against Canterbury while taking his best figures of 6 for 115. He was the chief executive of the Central Districts Cricket Association for 20 years until he retired in 2010. He is the father of the Central Districts cricketer Campbell Furlong.

== Honours ==
In the 2016 Queen's Birthday Honours, Furlong was awarded the Queen's Service Medal for services to cricket and rugby.

The Furlong Cup, named after Blair Furlong, is the annual competition of two-day matches among the six North Island associations of the Central Districts.
