= Joe Hill =

Joe Hill may refer to:

- Joe Hill (activist) (1879–1915), Swedish-American labor activist and songwriter
- Joe Hill (writer) (born 1972), pen name of American author Joseph Hillstrom King, son of author Stephen King
- Joe Hill (film), 1971 biopic of the activist
- "Joe Hill" (song), 1936 folk song about the activist written by Alfred Hayes and composed by Earl Robinson
- Joe Hill (opera), about the activist, by Alan Bush and Barrie Stavis, first performed in 1970
- Joe Hill House, Catholic Worker Movement house of hospitality in Salt Lake City, Utah, which operated from 1961 to 1968
- Joe Hill Award, awarded annually since 1989 by the Labor Heritage Foundation for a body of work in the field of labor culture
- Blind Joe Hill (1937–1998), American blues singer, guitarist, harmonica player, and drummer
- Joe Hill, fictional character on the TV series Blue Bloods

== See also ==
- Jo Hill (born 1973), Australian women's basketball player
- Bobby Joe Hill (1943–2002), American basketball player
- Dusty Hill (Joe Michael Hill, 1949–2021), American bassist associated with the band ZZ Top
- Joseph Graves Olney (1849–1884), American rancher and outlaw who used the alias "Joe Hill"
- Joe Hills (1897–1969), English cricketer and umpire
- Joe Hills (American football) (born 1987), American football wide receiver
- Joseph Hill (disambiguation)
