= Emmett Craik =

New Zealand cricketer (born 1974)

Personal information
- Born: 25 November 1974 (age 51); Hastings, New Zealand
- Source: Cricinfo, 29 October 2020

Emmett Craik (born 25 November 1974) is a New Zealand cricketer. He played in one first-class and three List A matches for Central Districts in 1999/00.

== See also ==
- List of Central Districts representative cricketers
