= Terry Horne =

New Zealand cricketer (1953–2019)

Personal information
- Full name: Terry Bryce Horne
- Born: 2 October 1953; Nelson, New Zealand
- Died: 7 September 2019 (aged 65); Nelson, New Zealand
- Source: Cricinfo, 29 October 2020

Terry Bryce Horne (2 October 1953 – 7 September 2019) was a New Zealand cricketer. He played in twelve first-class matches for Central Districts from 1977 and 1980.

Horne was educated at Nelson College from 1966 to 1970, and played in the school's 1st XI cricket team in his final two years there. He became a lawyer and accountant, and was an executive at Sealord Group in Nelson, retiring as the company's general manager of corporate services in 2010 after 18 years with the firm.

Horne died in Nelson on 7 September 2019.

== See also ==
- List of Central Districts representative cricketers
