= Richard Ellis (New Zealand cricketer) =

New Zealand cricketer (born 1945)

Personal information
- Born: 22 May 1945 (age 81); Nelson, New Zealand
- Source: Cricinfo, 29 October 2020

Richard Ellis (born 22 May 1945) is a New Zealand cricketer. He played in fourteen first-class and five List A matches for Central Districts from 1971 to 1978.

== See also ==
- List of Central Districts representative cricketers
