= Michael Taiaroa =

New Zealand cricketer (born 1988)

Personal information
- Born: 3 July 1988 (age 38); Hastings, New Zealand
- Source: Cricinfo, 29 October 2020

Michael Taiaroa (born 3 July 1988) is a New Zealand cricketer. He played in one first-class match for Central Districts in 2008.

== See also ==
- List of Central Districts representative cricketers
