= Graham Douglas (cricketer) =

New Zealand cricketer (born 1945)

Personal information
- Born: 13 May 1945 (age 81); Nelson, New Zealand
- Source: Cricinfo, 29 October 2020

Graham Douglas (born 13 May 1945) is a New Zealand cricketer. He played in ten first-class matches for Central Districts from 1965 to 1968.

== See also ==
- List of Central Districts representative cricketers
