= Buddy Banks (saxophonist) =

American jazz saxophonist, pianist, and bandleader (1909–1991)

- Birth name: Ulysses Banks
- Born: October 3, 1909 Dallas, Texas, U.S.
- Died: September 7, 1991 (aged 82) Desert Hot Springs, California, U.S.
- Genres: Jazz
- Instruments: Tenor saxophone, piano

Ulysses "Buddy" Banks (October 3, 1909 – September 7, 1991) was an American jazz tenor saxophonist, pianist, and bandleader.

== Career ==
Banks played in Charlie Echols's band in Los Angeles from 1933 to 1937 and remained in the group after it was taken over by Claude Kennedy, and then by Emerson Scott, after Kennedy's death. The group then scored a gig at the Paradise Cafe, and Cee Pee Johnson became its leader; Banks played in Johnson's ensemble until 1945. Following this Banks led his own group; this band featured tenor sax and trombone as its most prominent instruments, the trombone position being held by Allen Durham, cousin of Eddie Durham and Herschel Evans, and then by Wesley Huff. Guitarist Wesley Pile and drummer Monk McFay also recorded as members of this group. The ensemble played throughout southern California and recorded until 1949. Banks led a new group in 1950, but disbanded it quickly.

Banks and his Orchestra performed at the fifth Cavalcade of Jazz held at Wrigley Field in Los Angeles which was produced by Leon Hefflin, Sr. on July 10, 1949.

In 1950, he began playing piano, and though he accompanied Fluffy Hunter on tenor saxophone in 1953, he spent most of the rest of his life on piano, including in a piano-bass duo with Al Morgan (1953–1976). He played solo piano into the 1980s.
