= Paul Gibbs (cricketer) =

New Zealand cricketer (born 1965)

Personal information
- Born: 3 July 1965 (age 61); Marton, New Zealand
- Source: Cricinfo, 29 October 2020

Paul Gibbs (born 3 July 1965) is a New Zealand cricketer. He played in three first-class and six List A matches for Central Districts from 1990 to 1992.

== See also ==
- List of Central Districts representative cricketers
