= Colin Atkinson (New Zealand cricketer) =

New Zealand cricketer (1951–2019)

Personal information
- Full name: Colin Maurice Hilton Atkinson
- Born: 6 November 1951; Taumarunui, New Zealand
- Died: 21 May 2019 (aged 67); Waipukurau, New Zealand
- Source: Cricinfo, 29 October 2020

Colin Maurice Hilton Atkinson (6 November 1951 – 21 May 2019) was a New Zealand cricketer. He played in ten first-class and five List A matches for Central Districts from 1975 to 1982. Following his playing career, he also became a cricket coach.

Atkinson died in Waipukurau on 21 May 2019, at the age of 67.

== See also ==
- List of Central Districts representative cricketers
