= Andrew Niblett =

New Zealand cricketer (born 1977)

Personal information
- Born: 25 April 1977 (age 49); Vanderbijlpark, South Africa
- Source: Cricinfo, 29 October 2020

Andrew Niblett (born 25 April 1977) is a New Zealand cricketer. He played in five first-class matches for Central Districts in 2006 and 2007, and for Basingstoke and North Hants in the Southern Premier Cricket League in England in 2014. He has also worked as a cricket coach in South Africa, the Netherlands, England and Australia.

== See also ==
- List of Central Districts representative cricketers
