= Carl Trask =

New Zealand cricketer (born 1974)

Personal information
- Born: 10 February 1974 (age 52); Levin, New Zealand
- Source: Cricinfo, 29 October 2020

Carl Trask (born 10 February 1974) is a New Zealand cricketer. He played in one List A match for Central Districts in 1999/00.

== See also ==
- List of Central Districts representative cricketers
