= Murray Jamieson =

New Zealand cricketer (born 1952)

Personal information
- Born: 8 December 1952 (age 73); Dunedin, New Zealand
- Source: Cricinfo, 29 October 2020

Murray Jamieson (born 8 December 1952) is a New Zealand cricketer. He played in five first-class and eight List A matches for Central Districts from 1980 to 1983.

== See also ==
- List of Central Districts representative cricketers
