= Greg Hart (cricketer) =

New Zealand cricketer (born 1971)

Personal information
- Born: 23 April 1971 (age 55); Christchurch, New Zealand
- Source: Cricinfo, 29 October 2020

Greg Hart (born 23 April 1971) is a New Zealand cricketer. He played in five first-class matches for Central Districts in 1994–95.

== See also ==
- List of Central Districts representative cricketers
