= Ross Glover =

New Zealand cricketer (born 1964)

Ross L Glover
Personal information
- Born: 5 May 1964 (age 62); Masterton, New Zealand
- Source: Cricinfo, 29 October 2020

Ross Glover (born 5 May 1964) is a New Zealand cricketer. He played in eleven first-class and twenty List A matches for Central Districts from 1985 to 1992. He also played a season in 1991 as professional/coach for Kirkcaldy Cricket Club (now defunct) in the Scottish East League First Division.

== See also ==
- List of Central Districts representative cricketers
