= Percy Dyhrberg =

New Zealand cricketer

Personal information
- Born: 10 February 1918; Wellington, New Zealand
- Died: 30 March 1990 (aged 72); Wellington, New Zealand
- Source: Cricinfo, 29 October 2020

Percy Dyhrberg (10 February 1918 – 30 March 1990) was a New Zealand cricketer. He played in one first-class match for Central Districts in 1951/52.

== See also ==
- List of Central Districts representative cricketers
