= Richard Hayward (cricketer) =

English cricketer (1954–2026)

Personal information
- Full name: Richard Edward Hayward
- Born: 15 February 1954; Ickenham, Middlesex, England
- Died: 27 August 2026 (aged 72); Nelson, New Zealand
- Nickname: Shots
- Batting: Left-handed
- Bowling: Left-arm medium

Domestic team information
- Years: Team
- 1978–1989: Buckinghamshire
- 1981–1982: Hampshire
- 1982–83 – 1985–86: Central Districts
- 1985: Somerset

Career statistics
Competition	First-class	List A
Matches	50	48
Runs scored	1,766	889
Batting average	26.75	28.67
100s/50s	3/9	0/5
Top score	102	78*
Balls bowled	186	102
Wickets	0	2
Bowling average	–	32.50
5 wickets in innings	–	0
10 wickets in match	–	0
Best bowling	–	2/37
Catches/stumpings	27/–	11/–
- Source: Cricinfo, 7 February 2010

Richard Edward Hayward (15 February 1954 – 27 August 2026) was an English cricketer who played first-class cricket in England for Hampshire and in New Zealand for Central Districts. Following his retirement from playing, Hayward remained in New Zealand. There in 1998 he was appointed the Nelson Cricket Association's first coaching director, becoming the first full-time professional coaching director appointed by a district association in New Zealand. In 2002, he became Canterbury's coaching director. In 2026 he became a match referee for New Zealand Cricket.

== Career in England ==
=== Early life and career ===
Hayward was born in Ickenham on 15 February 1954. After spending five years playing for the Middlesex Second Eleven, during which he was unable to force his way into the Middlesex starting eleven, Hayward joined minor county Buckinghamshire for the 1978 season, making ten appearances in the 1978 Minor Counties Championship. The following season, he made ten appearances in the Minor Counties Championship. Against Berkshire in July, he scored a century with an unbeaten 109 runs in Buckinghamshire's first innings of 196 for 6 declared. In the same season, Hayward was selected to play for the Minor Counties representative team against the touring Indians at Wellington, with the match marking his debut in first-class cricket. He made his debut in List A one-day cricket in the same season, playing for Minor Counties South in the Benson & Hedges Cup; he also played for Buckinghamshire against Suffolk in the first round of the Gillette Cup.

=== Move to Hampshire ===
Hayward began playing Second Eleven cricket for Hampshire in 1979, and in 1981 he made his first eleven debut in a first-class match against the touring Sri Lankans at Bournemouth. The match was notable for Hayward becoming the third Hampshire player (after Cecil Abercrombie in 1913 and Dennis Baldry in 1959) to score a century on debut, making an unbeaten 101. Toward the end of the 1981 season, he made six appearances in the County Championship, scoring 131 runs. He featured for Hampshire in their defeat to Lancashire in the quarter-final of the 1981 NatWest Trophy, in addition to making three further one-day appearances in the John Player League. He made six first-class appearances in 1982, scoring 169 runs at an average of 21.12. In one-day cricket, his ten appearances yielded 119 runs at an average of 39.66. Hayward was released by Hampshire at the end of the season, alongside John Rice and Michael Bailey.

Following his release by Hampshire, Hayward resumed playing minor counties cricket for Buckinghamshire in the 1983 and 1984 seasons. During the 1984 season, he played one-day cricket for the Minor Counties representative team in the Benson & Hedges Cup and played for Buckinghamshire against Lancashire in the first round of the NatWest Trophy.

=== Season with Somerset ===
In May 1985, he was signed by Somerset to help bolster their injury-hit squad. He made his debut for Somerset in the County Championship against Gloucestershire, with him making nine first-class appearances during the season. In these, he scored 278 runs at an average of 30.88, making an unbeaten century against Cambridge University. Alongside his first-class appearances, Hayward also made eight one-day appearances for Somerset, scoring 239 runs at an average of 59.75, with three half centuries. At the end of the season, Hayward decided to permanently relocate to New Zealand.

== Career in New Zealand ==
=== Playing in New Zealand ===
After his release by Hampshire, Hayward returned to playing minor counties cricket for Buckinghamshire in 1983. During the winter which followed the 1983 season, Hayward played in New Zealand. His connection with New Zealand began in 1979, when he was looking for employment following the conclusion of the English season. His uncle, who lived in Nelson, recommended him to Nelson cricket administrator Jock Sutherland; at the time, the Nelson Cricket Association were looking to for a coach to replace the outgoing Billy Ibadulla. For the next six years he would come to New Zealand following the conclusion of the English season. In January 1983, he was selected to replace Ian Snook in the Central Districts team for their match against Northern Districts in the 1982–83 Shell Trophy, with him making two further appearances in the competition. The following season, he made eight first-class appearances in the 1983–84 Shell Trophy, and one against a touring England XI. In these, he scored 331 runs at an average of 27.58, with one century (102 runs) against Wellington. Alongside these, he also made five one-day appearances in the 1983–84 Shell Cup. At the end of the season, he deputised as captain for John Wiltshire, who had broken his arm at the beginning of February.

Resuming the Central Districts captaincy during the 1984–85 season, Hayward made seven first-class appearances in the 1984–85 Shell Trophy, scoring 294 runs at an average of 32.66. In the 1984–85 Shell Cup he made six appearances, scoring 227 runs at an average of 45.40, with two half centuries. Hayward's final season playing for Central Districts came in the 1985–86 season. In the 1985–86 Shell Trophy he made eight appearances, scoring 342 runs at an average of 26.30. In the 1985–86 Shell Cup, he made five appearances, scoring just 45 runs at an average of exactly 9. He captained Central Districts in first-class cricket during the season, but was replaced as one-day captain by Martin Crowe. With Hayward announcing his retirement in February 1986, he was omitted from the Central Districts team for the remainder of the season, missing out on playing against the touring Australians. Hayward made 50 appearances in his first-class career, scoring 1,766 runs at an average of 26.75, with three centuries. In one-day cricket, he made 48 appearances, scoring 989 runs at an average of 31.90.

== Post-retirement ==
Following his retirement, Hayward continued to play cricket in England during the New Zealand winter, representing Buckinghamshire in the Minor Counties Championship until 1989 and the MCCA Knockout Trophy until 1987. Throughout the 1980s, he was a member of the Nelson team that dominated the Hawke Cup, with his Hawke Cup career culminating in December 1990. Hayward subsequently bought a shop in Nelson. In 1998, he was appointed Nelson's coaching director, making him the first full-time professional coaching director appointed by a district association. In August 2002, he became Canterbury's coaching director. He was later appointed a match referee for New Zealand Cricket, an appointment he maintained as of 2026. In November 2019 he was made a life member of the Central Districts Cricket Association.

Hayward died in Nelson on 27 August 2026, aged 72.
