= Alexander McGuire =

New Zealand cricketer

Personal information
- Full name: Alexander James McGuire
- Born: 5 October 1932; Wellington, New Zealand
- Died: 4 February 2025 (aged 92); Christchurch, New Zealand
- Batting: Right-handed

Domestic team information
- Years: Team
- 1957/58: Central Districts
- Source: Cricinfo, 29 October 2020

Alexander James McGuire (5 October 1932 – 4 February 2025) was a New Zealand cricketer. He played in four first-class matches for Central Districts in 1957/58. He died on 4 February 2025, at the age of 92.

== See also ==
- List of Central Districts representative cricketers
