= Gerald Haddon =

New Zealand cricketer (born 1941)

Personal information
- Born: 31 May 1941 (age 85); Palmerston North, New Zealand
- Source: Cricinfo, 29 October 2020

Gerald Haddon (born 31 May 1941) is a New Zealand cricketer. He played in four first-class matches for Central Districts in 1969/70.

== See also ==
- List of Central Districts representative cricketers
