= Barry Jones =

Barry Jones may refer to:

- Barry Jones (actor) (1893–1981), British-born actor
- Barry Jones (Australian politician) (born 1932), member of the ALP
- Barry Jones, Baron Jones (born 1938), British politician
- Barry Jones (Canadian politician) (born 1940)
- Barry Jones (bishop) (1941–2016), ninth Bishop of Christchurch, New Zealand
- Barry Jones (cricketer) (born 1955), English cricketer; played for Worcestershire, 1976–1980
- Barry Jones (baseball) (born 1963), former Major League Baseball pitcher
- Barry Jones (footballer) (born 1970), formerly of Wrexham and York City
- Barry Jones (boxer) (born 1974), British boxer and WBO Super featherweight Champion
- Barry Jones (magician) (born 1980), Scottish magician
- Barry Jones (executive), former chief executive of the Australian Petroleum Production and Exploration Association

== See also ==
- Barrie Jones (disambiguation)
