= Steven Smidt =

New Zealand cricketer (born 1989)

Personal information
- Born: 12 November 1989 (age 37); Napier, New Zealand
- Source: Cricinfo, 29 October 2020

Steven Smidt (born 12 November 1989) is a New Zealand cricketer. He played in six first-class and three List A matches for Central Districts from 2011 to 2015.

== See also ==
- List of Central Districts representative cricketers
