= Gary Langridge =

New Zealand cricketer (born 1952)

Personal information
- Born: 5 April 1952 (age 74); Wellington, New Zealand
- Source: Cricinfo, 29 October 2020

Gary Langridge (born 5 April 1952) is a New Zealand cricketer. He played in thirty first-class and eleven List A matches for Central Districts from 1976 to 1982.

== See also ==
- List of Central Districts representative cricketers
