= Jason Pawley =

New Zealand cricketer (born 1972)

Personal information
- Born: 11 July 1972 (age 54); Houston, Texas, United States
- Source: Cricinfo, 29 October 2020

Jason Pawley (born 11 July 1972) is a New Zealand cricketer who played in one first-class and one List A match for Central Districts in 1994/95 and 1995/96.

== See also ==
- List of Central Districts representative cricketers
