= Ron Brown (cricketer) =

New Zealand cricketer (1924–2008)

Personal information
- Born: 18 April 1924; Auckland, New Zealand
- Died: 23 March 2008 (aged 83); Whanganui, New Zealand
- Source: Cricinfo, 29 October 2020

Ron Brown (18 April 1924 – 23 March 2008) was a New Zealand cricketer. He played in fourteen first-class matches for Central Districts from 1952 to 1958.

== See also ==
- List of Central Districts representative cricketers
