= Luke Murray (cricketer) =

New Zealand cricketer (born 1980)

Personal information
- Born: 2 May 1980 (age 46); Palmerston North, New Zealand
- Source: Cricinfo, 29 October 2020

Luke Murray (born 2 May 1980) is a New Zealand cricketer. He played in one List A match for Central Districts in 2007.

== See also ==
- List of Central Districts representative cricketers
