= Gary Walton =

New Zealand cricketer (born 1959)

Personal information
- Born: 17 April 1959 (age 67); Nelson, New Zealand
- Source: Cricinfo, 29 October 2020

Gary Walton (born 17 April 1959) is a New Zealand cricketer. He played in seven first-class matches for Central Districts from 1985 to 1988.

== See also ==
- List of Central Districts representative cricketers
