= Andrew Patterson =

Andrew Patterson may refer to:

- Andrew Oliphant Patterson (1825–1887), American politician in Iowa and Colorado
- Andrew Patterson (Wisconsin politician) (1831–1893), Irish American farmer-politician in Wisconsin
- Pat Patterson (Negro league infielder) (Andrew Lawrence Patterson, 1911–1984), American baseball player
- Andrew Patterson (architect) (born 1960), New Zealand architect
- Andy Patterson (born 1964), American racer
- Andrew Patterson (cricketer) (born 1975), Irish cricketer
- Andrew Patterson (film director) (born 1982), American filmmaker
- Andrew Patterson (racing driver) (born 2002), American stock car racing driver
- Andrew Patterson (Patterson), fictional academic, central character of British radio series Patterson

== See also ==
- Andrew Paterson (disambiguation)
