= Paul Lowes =

New Zealand cricketer (born 1966)

Personal information
- Born: 8 June 1966 (age 60); Hastings, New Zealand
- Source: Cricinfo, 29 October 2020

Paul Lowes (born 8 June 1966) is a New Zealand cricketer. He played in eight first-class matches for Central Districts in 1990/91.

== See also ==
- List of Central Districts representative cricketers
