= Dominic Rayner =

New Zealand cricketer (born 1983)

Personal information
- Born: 26 August 1983 (age 43); Marton, New Zealand
- Source: Cricinfo, 29 October 2020

Dominic Rayner (born 26 August 1983) is a New Zealand cricketer. He played in one first-class match for Central Districts in 2007.

== See also ==
- List of Central Districts representative cricketers
