= Glen Smidt =

New Zealand cricketer (born 1963)

Personal information
- Born: 4 December 1963 (age 62); Napier, New Zealand
- Source: Cricinfo, 29 October 2020

Glen Smidt (born 4 December 1963) is a New Zealand cricketer. He played in two List A matches for Central Districts in 1986/87.

== See also ==
- List of Central Districts representative cricketers
