= Graham Buist =

New Zealand cricketer

Personal information
- Born: 23 July 1936 (age 90); Napier, New Zealand
- Source: Cricinfo, 29 October 2020

Graham Buist (born 23 July 1936) is a New Zealand cricketer. He played in eight first-class matches for Central Districts from 1956 to 1958.

== See also ==
- List of Central Districts representative cricketers
