= Mattie Thomas =

New Zealand cricketer (born 1991)

Personal information
- Born: 5 December 1991 (age 34); Hāwera, New Zealand
- Source: Cricinfo, 29 October 2020

Mattie Thomas (born 5 December 1991) is a New Zealand cricketer. He played in one List A match for Central Districts in 2015.

== See also ==
- List of Central Districts representative cricketers
