= Daniel Wightman =

New Zealand cricketer (born 1993)

Personal information
- Born: 5 August 1993 (age 33); Auckland, New Zealand
- Source: Cricinfo, 29 October 2020

Daniel Wightman (born 5 August 1993) is a New Zealand cricketer. He played in two first-class matches for Central Districts in 2012.

== See also ==
- List of Central Districts representative cricketers
