= James de Terte =

New Zealand cricketer (born 1983)

Personal information
- Born: 16 January 1983 (age 43); Sydney, Australia
- Source: Cricinfo, 29 October 2020

James de Terte (born 16 January 1983) is a New Zealand cricketer. He played in four first-class matches for Central Districts from 2008 to 2012.

== See also ==
- List of Central Districts representative cricketers
