= Robert Kelly (cricketer) =

New Zealand cricketer

Personal information
- Full name: Robert Arthur Kelly
- Born: 4 June 1936; Dannevirke, New Zealand
- Died: 15 January 2019 (aged 82); Brisbane, Australia
- Batting: Right-handed

Domestic team information
- Years: Team
- 1961/62: Central Districts
- Source: Cricinfo, 29 October 2020

Robert Arthur Kelly (4 June 1936 – 15 January 2019) was a New Zealand cricketer. He played in four first-class matches for Central Districts in 1961/62.

== See also ==
- List of Central Districts representative cricketers
