= Richard McLeod =

New Zealand cricketer (born 1965)

Personal information
- Born: 13 October 1965 (age 61); Nelson, New Zealand
- Source: Cricinfo, 29 October 2020

Richard McLeod (born 13 October 1965) is a New Zealand cricketer. He played in three first-class matches for Central Districts in 1990/91.

== See also ==
- List of Central Districts representative cricketers
