= Tony Hill (cricketer) =

New Zealand cricketer (born 1952)

Personal information
- Born: 13 March 1952 (age 74); Auckland, New Zealand
- Source: Cricinfo, 29 October 2020

Tony Hill (born 13 March 1952) is a New Zealand cricketer. He played in two first-class matches for Central Districts from 1975 to 1977.

== See also ==
- List of Central Districts representative cricketers
