= Julian Houghton =

New Zealand cricketer

Personal information
- Born: 16 February 1931; Christchurch, New Zealand
- Died: 6 October 2004 (aged 73); Masterton, New Zealand
- Source: Cricinfo, 29 October 2020

Julian Houghton (16 February 1931 – 6 October 2004) was a New Zealand cricketer. He played in three first-class matches for Central Districts in 1953/54.

== See also ==
- List of Central Districts representative cricketers
