= Charles Garrod =

New Zealand cricketer (born 1947)

Personal information
- Full name: Charles William Garrod
- Born: 6 April 1947 (age 79); Blenheim, New Zealand
- Source: Cricinfo, 29 October 2020

Charles Garrod (born 6 April 1947) is a New Zealand cricketer. He played in four first-class matches for Central Districts in 1966/67.

== See also ==
- List of Central Districts representative cricketers
