= Don Beuth =

New Zealand cricketer (born 1941)

Personal information
- Born: 6 June 1941 (age 85); Gisborne, New Zealand
- Source: Cricinfo, 29 October 2020

Don Beuth (born 6 June 1941) is a New Zealand cricketer. He played in three first-class matches for Central Districts in 1968/69.

== See also ==
- List of Central Districts representative cricketers
