= Gregory Logan =

New Zealand cricketer (born 1963)

Personal information
- Born: 25 June 1963 (age 63); Waikari, New Zealand
- Source: Cricinfo, 29 October 2020

Gregory Logan (born 25 June 1963) is a New Zealand former cricketer. He played in 22 first-class and 21 List A matches for Central Districts from 1986 to 1990.

== See also ==
- List of Central Districts representative cricketers
