= Leon C. Collins =

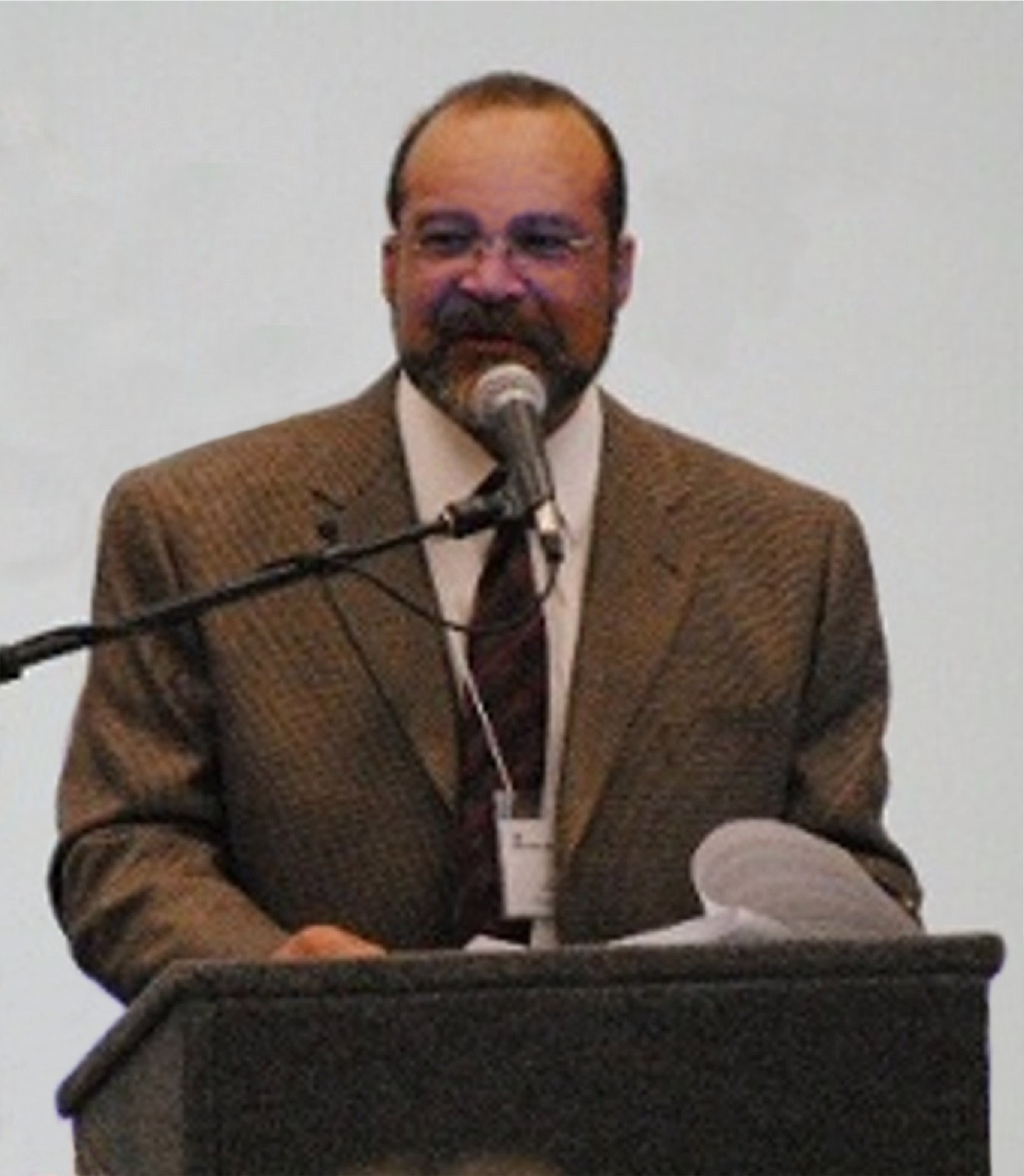
Leon C. Collins

Leon C. Collins is a media executive, media educator, producer/director, script writer, and photographic artist.

== Biography ==
Leon Collins was born in Washington, DC, on May 20, 1949. He received his Master of Arts degree from Antioch College in 1976. His Masters thesis was entitled “Black perspectives – Inner reality of visual thinking”.

In 1969, Collins was selected to become an intern at WETA-TV PBS in Washington, DC, during his junior year at Howard University, majoring in cinematography and television production. Leon, eventually became president of the National Association of Blacks in Public Broadcasting while working at the University of Houston.

For over three decades, Collins has held a variety of leadership and consulting positions, domestically and internationally with non governmental organizations, public broadcasting, and commercial broadcasting and community radio stations. These positions involved working with the following institutions: Executive Producer, iMichigan Productions; Director, Education and Leadership Programs, The Phelps Stokes Fund; Member PBS Board of Directors; General Manager, University of Michigan Public Broadcasting TV 28 PBS; Consultant, KQED TV PBS; Executive Director of Broadcasting, University of Houston PBS; Vice President, General Manager WPFW FM radio in Washington, DC; Production Consultant, WLII TV Lorimar Telepictures in Puerto Rico; and Station Manager WTJX TV PBS in the US Virgin Islands.

A recent leadership position was with The Phelps Stokes Fund, which is North America's oldest continuously operating foundation dedicated to Education for Human Development in Africa, the African Diaspora in the Americas, and indigenous communities in the Americas. Leon's assignment with the Fund included working with board members, elected officials, members of the United States Congress, faith based organizations, members of the press, consultants, graphic artists, IT web designers and other stakeholders. His portfolio included five programs, which required working with domestic foundations, individual donors for educational programs, and the United States Agency for International Development and its contractors. A training program was developed and implemented for producing radio programs, which were broadcast to community radio stations and the United Nations Mission in Liberia Radio (UNMIL) that reached over three million people. The produced community radio programs focused on media literacy, gender issues, health, HIV/AIDS, malaria, and overall empowerment of women, girls and children in Liberia, West Africa.

He became Executive in Charge of Production for "A World Transformed: Our Reflections on Ending the Cold War", hosted by former President George H.W. Bush, and moderated by Jim Lehrer of PBS. Five world leaders: George H. W. Bush (former President of the United States 1989-1993), Mikhail Gorbachev (former General Secretary of the Communist Party of the Soviet Union 1985-1991), Margaret Thatcher (former Prime Minister of the United Kingdom 1979-1990), Brian Mulroney (former Prime Minister of Canada 1984-1993) and François Mitterrand (former President of the French Republic 1981-1995) gathered at a private daylong summit in Colorado Springs, Colorado as part of a weekend fundraiser for the George H.W. Bush Presidential Library Center. They were the world leaders when the Berlin Wall came down, the Soviet Union was dissolved, the Cold War ended, East and West Germany united, and the U.S. emerged as the world's only superpower. Houston PBS was there filming and documenting this historic event, and then edited the 41-hour discussions of these former world leaders into a 90-minute documentary. The 90 minute summit special was distributed to PBS stations and international distributors.

He was the Director of the Mott Community College (MCC) Community Technology Centers. These five centers were a partnership with the University of Michigan-Flint, The City of Flint and Comcast Cable, and were designed to serve economically disadvantaged residents, Hispanics and people with disabilities living in low-income areas of Flint, Michigan. Leon directed the day to day administrative processes, involving the coaching of center directors and staff for the development of curriculum and the development of a structured learning program, designed for individuals interested in gaining job skills.

== Publications ==
- Race on Film: worth discussing – Leon Collins speaking at film festival about media stereotypes article in Duluth News Tribune about film festival at Fond du Lac Ojibwe School in Minnesota September 14, 2007
- Leon Collins, cover story interview On the Town Magazine December 2001 Flint, MI
- Collins dedicates his life to Public Broadcasting, Interview The Oakland Press January 17, 2001 Oakland, MI
- To connect each to all: mission of public cybercasters, Article for Current, (newspaper and website about public TV and radio), September 18, 2000
- Live Wire, WFUM director plugged into ways to move PBS station into the future, Interview Flint Journal, August 2, 1998 Flint, MI
- Public Broadcasting, End of An Era? Article for Our Texas Magazine, Summer 1995
- To connect each to all: mission of public cybercasters, article for Current (newspaper and website about public TV and radio), January 31, 1994
- Radio Spacecasting, National Federation of Community Broadcasters Community Radio Newsletter, Washington, DC, February 1992
- Station Based Producers in Community Radio, essay for Association of Independents in Radio AIR Producers Conference Dallas/Fort Worth Texas, November 18–21, 1992
- Tele Once from Atlanta, news article on Channel 11 Live Satellite news coverage of the National Democratic Convention El Vocero July 12, 1988 San Juan, Puerto Rico
- Students Intern at WETA, Interview The Washington Star Teen Section July 12, 1969 Washington, DC

== Awards and honors ==
- Cable Industry - Telley Award for script writer BET Jazz – 2006
- Senior Fellow – the Phelps Stokes Fund – Washington, DC – 2003
- Flint Advertising Federation ADDY Award for Public Service Announcement – 2002
- Former Board Member – Public Broadcasting Service (PBS) – 2001
- Past Chairperson – National Forum for Public Television Executives – 1999
- Who’s Who of International Technology Professionals – Gibraltar Publishing – 1998
- Grassroots Advocacy Award from America's Public Television Stations – 1996
- Senior Fellow – Houston Gulf Coast Chapter of the American Leadership Forum – 1996,
- Judge – National Information Infrastructure Awards Program – 1995-96
- Chairman of the University of Houston's 24 member Distance Learning Taskforce – 1993
- Mayor’s Award for Excellence in Service to the Arts in Washington DC – 1992
- Who’s Who of American Business Leaders – Gibraltar Publishing – 1991
- Advocacy Award from the National Association of Community Broadcasters – 1990
- Overseas Press Club OPC Journalism Awards WLII TV Best News Coverage – 1986

== Productions and Credits ==
- Executive in Charge of Production/Director/Cameraman – Educate a Woman, I’m Proud to be An African – a Music Video and Press Kit for Siah Passewe, Phelps Stokes, Liberia, West Africa.
- Executive in Charge of Production – Teamwork Makes the Dream Work a marketing documentary on the Call Me Mister National Initiative at Clemson University, Clemson, South Carolina.
- Associate producer and script writer – The Cayman Islands, Founded Upon the Sea, BET Jazz Channel, Washington, DC.
- Production Consultant – Motor Town Music Central, Detroit Michigan.
- Executive in Charge of Production, encompassing over 300 hours of original programming for; Teen Voice, Homepage a community magazine program, After-Hours a music performance series, Prosperity a Midwestern business series and many specials, including underwriting segments (spots) and pledge specials for WFUM, University of Michigan PBS station.
- Executive in Charge of Production for A World Transformed: Our Reflections on Ending the Cold War, moderated by Jim Lehrer of PBS and hosted by President H.W. Bush, Smithsonian: Voices of Discovery, BB King and Friends, the International Space Station, Diversity – What Is It? Managing Change – Who Does It? Weeknight and Weekday Edition; and various documentaries and specials at KUHT. Houston Public Television.
- Executive in Charge of Production for a daily live one-hour newscast and for several national jazz specials; WPFW FM radio, Washington, DC.
- Production Consultant and Executive Producer for news, public affairs, soap operas, entertainment programs, sports, news specials and children's programs for WLII TV Channel 11; Lorimar Telepictures in San Juan, Puerto Rico.
- Executive Producer for Democratic and Republican national conventions in Atlanta and New Orleans. Coordinated live satellite cut-ins for two daily live newscasts for Spanish Language WLII TV Channel 11, San Juan, Puerto Rico.
- Executive in Charge of Production for all aspects of production and executive producer for diverse local programming specials; including A Taste of Paradise, the story of Rum in the Virgin Islands for WTJX TV PBS US Virgin Islands.
- Executive Producer “A Taste of Paradise,” the story of Rum in the U.S. Virgin Islands for the Virgin Islands Department of Commerce for international distribution.
- Associate Producer/Director/Cameraman “Liberia: The Quiet Revolution.” an archival history of the inauguration of President William Tolbert of the Republic of Liberia, West Africa.

== Presentations ==
- Digital, Digital, Digital: the Coming of Media Convergence Part 1 on YouTube
- Digital, Digital, Digital: the Coming of Media Convergence Part 2 on YouTube
- Digital, Digital, Digital: the Coming of Media Convergence Part 3 on YouTube
