= Marc Calkin =

New Zealand cricketer (born 1979)

Personal information
- Born: 29 November 1979 (age 46); Masterton, New Zealand
- Source: Cricinfo, 24 October 2020

Marc Calkin (born 29 November 1979) is a New Zealand cricketer. He played in three List A and seven Twenty20 matches for Wellington and Central Districts from 2009 to 2011.
