= Gavin McRae =

New Zealand cricketer (born 1965)

Personal information
- Born: 24 March 1965 (age 61); Blenheim, New Zealand
- Source: Cricinfo, 29 October 2020

Gavin McRae (born 24 March 1965) is a New Zealand cricketer. He played in 3 first-class and 31 List A matches for Central Districts from 1992 to 1996.

== See also ==
- List of Central Districts representative cricketers
