= Martyn Sigley =

New Zealand cricketer (born 1972)

Personal information
- Born: 16 November 1972 (age 53); Hamilton, New Zealand
- Source: Cricinfo, 29 October 2020

Martyn Sigley (born 16 November 1972) is a New Zealand cricketer. He played in 44 first-class and 4 List A matches for Central Districts from 1994 to 2003.

== See also ==
- List of Central Districts representative cricketers
