= Karl O'Dowda =

New Zealand cricketer (born 1970)

Personal information
- Full name: Karl Robert O'Dowda
- Born: 8 May 1970 (age 56); New Plymouth, Taranaki, New Zealand
- Batting: Right-handed
- Bowling: Right-arm fast-medium
- Role: Bowler

Domestic team information
- Years: Team
- 1988/89: Central Districts
- 1988/89–1989/90: Taranaki
- 1991/92–2000/01: Otago
- 1998/99–1999/00: Dunedin Metropolitan
- Source: ESPNcricinfo, 20 May 2016

Karl Robert O'Dowda (born 8 May 1970) is a New Zealand former cricketer. He played first-class and List A matches for Central Districts and Otago between the 1988–89 and 2000–01 seasons.

O'Dowda was born at New Plymouth in the Taranaki region of New Zealand in 1970. He was educated at New Plymouth Boys' High School in the city. After playing age-group cricket for Central Districts at the start of the 1988–89 season, he made his senior representative debut for the side in a December 1988 List A match against Canterbury, taking two wickets on debut. He went on to play a further List A match and two first-class matches for the team during the season, as well as playing for Taranaki in the Hawke Cup. He toured Australia with the national under-19 team later in the season, playing in three unofficial Text matches and two Youth One Day Internationals on the tour. Later in 1989 he toured England with the side, playing in a further three Youth ODIs on the tour.

Although he played for age-group and Second XI sides the following season, as well as for Taranaki again, O'Dowda did not feature in Central Districts' First XI again. He moved to play for Otago ahead of the 1991–92 season, playing five Plunket Shield matches during the season. He played intermittently for Otago over the following nine season, making a total of nine first-class and 14 Last A appearances for the team.

O'Dowda has since worked in the police service, including as a Detective Constable in the Dunedin area.
