= Horowhenua-Kapiti cricket team =

New Zealand cricket team

Personnel
- Owner: Horowhenua-Kapiti Cricket Association

Team information
- Founded: 1912
- Home ground: Donnelly Park, Levin

History
- Hawke Cup wins: 0
- Official website: HKCA

The Horowhenua-Kapiti cricket team is a New Zealand team that represents the Horowhenua and Kāpiti Coast districts in the southern part of the North Island, with its headquarters in Levin. It is one of the 21 teams from around New Zealand that compete in the Hawke Cup.

== History ==
A Horowhenua Cricket Association was operating in the mid-1890s, but it lapsed. It was re-formed in 1912, and the five competing teams for the 1912–13 season were Foxton, Kimberley, Levin, Otaki and Shannon. In December 1913 the Horowhenua Cricket Association became the first cricket organisation in New Zealand to adopt the eight-ball over.

Horowhenua played a few matches against neighbouring associations in the 1920s, most commonly Manawatu. At the time, before Horowhenua competed in the Hawke Cup in its own right, Horowhenua players were eligible to play for Manawatu in Hawke cup matches.

Horowhenua affiliated with the New Zealand Cricket Council in 1963, qualifying them to compete in the Hawke Cup. They played five Hawke Cup challenge matches between 1966 (captained by Warren Murdock) and 1990. The Horowhenua and Kapiti associations amalgamated in the early 2000s to form the Horowhenua-Kapiti Cricket Association. Horowhenua-Kapiti have yet to play a Hawke Cup challenge match.

Several grounds have been used by Horowhenua and Horowhenua-Kapiti; the main ground for many years was Levin Domain. Horowhenua-Kapiti's headquarters and home ground are now at Donnelly Park in Levin. Kena Kena Park in Paraparaumu is also used. As of the 2024–25 season, the senior competing clubs in the Horowhenua-Kapiti Cricket Association are Kapiti Old Boys, Levin Old Boys, Paraparaumu, Waikanae and Weraroa.
