= Haydn Morgan (cricketer) =

English cricketer

Personal information
- Full name: Haydn John Morgan
- Born: 5 July 1973 (age 53); Torquay, Devon, England
- Batting: Right-handed
- Bowling: Right-arm off break

Domestic team information
- Years: Team
- 1995–1996: Devon
- 2000/01: Central Districts

Career statistics
Competition	First-class	List A
Matches	2	2
Runs scored	11	40
Batting average	2.75	20.00
100s/50s	0/0	0/0
Top score	8	34
Balls bowled	384	60
Wickets	2	1
Bowling average	78.50	24.00
5 wickets in innings	0	0
10 wickets in match	0	0
Best bowling	2/64	1/24
Catches/stumpings	1/–	0/–
- Source: Cricinfo, 8 February 2011

Haydn John Morgan (born 5 July 1973) is a former English cricketer. Morgan was a right-handed batsman who bowled right-arm off break. He was born in Torquay, Devon.

== Career ==
Morgan made his debut for Devon in 1995 against Cheshire in the Minor Counties Championship. From 1995 to 1996, he represented Devon in 7 Championship matches, the last of which came against Norfolk. In the 1996 NatWest Trophy, he played his only List A match for Devon against Essex.

Morgan later joined Central Districts in New Zealand, making his debut in first-class cricket for them against Northern Districts in the 2000/01 season. He played one further first-class match for the team, coming in the same season, against Wellington. In his two first-class matches, he scored 11 runs at a batting average of 2.75, with a high score of 8. With the ball he took 2 wickets at a bowling average of 78.50, with best figures of 2/64. Morgan also played a single List A match for the team in the 2000/01 Shell Cup against Northern Districts.

Prior to the above, he played Second XI cricket for the Gloucestershire Second XI (1992–1993) and the Somerset Second XI (1995–1997).

He has worked for the University of Bath as a Senior Lecturer and has previously been employed by University of Gloucestershire, Plymouth University and Cornwall College.
