= Craig Auckram =

New Zealand cricketer (born 1967)

Personal information
- Full name: Craig Laurence Auckram
- Born: 9 June 1967 (age 59); Levin, New Zealand
- Batting: Right-handed
- Bowling: Right arm fast

Domestic team information
- Years: Team
- 1989/90–1996/97: Central Districts

Career statistics
Competition	First-class	List A
Matches	16	4
Runs scored	30	3
Batting average	7.50	1.50
100s/50s	0/0	0/0
Top score	14*	2
Balls bowled	1,988	138
Wickets	33	2
Bowling average	35.24	57
5 wickets in innings	2	0
10 wickets in match	0	0
Best bowling	7/61	1/23
Catches/stumpings	2/–	0/–
- Source: Cricinfo, 16 February 2010

Craig Laurence Auckram (born 9 June 1967) is a New Zealand former cricketer who played 20 first-class matches for Central Districts in the early 1990s. He played Hawke Cup cricket for Horowhenua, Marlborough and Manawatu, winning the Hawke Cup on two occasions. He was born at Levin and lives in Palmerston North, working as a planning officer at the Palmerston North City Council.
