= Herbert Rice (cricketer) =

New Zealand cricketer

Personal information
- Born: 5 September 1918; Wellington, New Zealand
- Died: 13 July 1982 (aged 63); Wellington, New Zealand
- Source: Cricinfo, 27 October 2020

Herbert Rice (5 September 1918 – 13 July 1982) was a New Zealand cricketer. He played in twelve first-class matches for Wellington and Central Districts from 1937 to 1951.
