= Ross Ormiston =

New Zealand cricketer (born 1955)

Ross William Ormiston was a New Zealand cricketer born on 19 October 1955, in New Plymouth. He played 56 first-class matches for Central Districts & Wellington without being selected for the Black Caps. In 1981–1982 he and Evan Gray added 226 for Wellington against Central Districts.
