= Peter Holland (cricketer) =

New Zealand cricketer (born 1958)

Personal information
- Born: 5 May 1958 (age 68); Nelson, New Zealand
- Source: Cricinfo, 24 October 2020

Peter Holland (born 5 May 1958) is a New Zealand cricketer. He played in 39 first-class and 15 List A matches for Central Districts, Northern Districts and Wellington from 1976 to 1984.
