= David Neal (cricketer) =

New Zealand cricketer (born 1951)

Personal information
- Born: 4 September 1951 (age 75); Blenheim, New Zealand
- Source: Cricinfo, 29 October 2020

David Neal (born 4 September 1951) is a New Zealand cricketer. He played in 27 first-class and 6 List A matches for Central Districts from 1971 to 1977.

== See also ==
- List of Central Districts representative cricketers
