= Peter Bloomfield (cricketer) =

New Zealand cricketer

Personal information
- Full name: Peter James Bloomfield
- Born: 30 June 1936; Motueka, New Zealand
- Died: 7 December 2025 (aged 89); Kaeo, Northland, New Zealand
- Batting: Right-handed
- Bowling: Right-arm fast-medium

Domestic team information
- Years: Team
- 1957/58–1958/59: Central Districts
- Source: Cricinfo, 29 October 2020

Peter James Bloomfield (30 June 1936 – 7 December 2025) was a New Zealand cricketer. He played in six first-class matches for Central Districts from 1957 to 1959.

== See also ==
- List of Central Districts representative cricketers
