= Richard Wixon =

New Zealand cricketer (1957–2026)

Personal information
- Full name: Richard Pahi Wixon
- Born: 19 February 1957; Bluff, New Zealand
- Died: 19 January 2026 (aged 68); Christchurch, New Zealand
- Batting: Right-handed
- Bowling: Slow left-arm orthodox
- Role: Bowler

Domestic team information
- Years: Team
- 1988–89: Rangitikei
- 1990–91 – 1991–92: Manawatu
- 1991–92 – 1992–93: Central Districts
- 1993–94 – 1994–95: Otago
- Source: CricInfo, 29 May 2016

Richard Pahi Wixon (19 February 1957 – 19 January 2026) was a New Zealand cricketer. He played first-class and List A matches for Central Districts and Otago between the 1991–92 and 1994–95 seasons.

== Biography ==
Wixon was born at Bluff in Southland on 19 February 1957. He was educated at James Hargest High School. He played under-20 cricket for Otago, where he was coached by Jack Alabaster and was rated a "bright" prospect, and played rugby union as a back for South Island under-16 and under-18 sides. After joining the New Zealand Army, he played cricket for Combined Services teams and rugby union and was considered an "outstanding prospect" as a second five-eighth or full-back. He played for the Canterbury under-19 side, and continued to play sport during his army career.

It was not until 1988–89 that Wixon played any representative cricket. He played for Rangitikei and then Manawatu in 1990–91 and 1991–92 in the Hawke Cup. After taking seven wickets for Manawatu in the 1991–92 Hawke Cup challenge match against Southland, Wixon made his first-class debut for Central Districts later in the season. He played in four first-class and a single List A match for the side, taking 10 first-class wickets, before moving to play for Otago in 1993–94. In two seasons with the side, during which time he played club cricket for Albion Cricket Club in Dunedin, he played a further 26 senior matches, taking 24 first-class and 10 List A wickets.

Wixon died on 19 January 2026, at the age of 68.
