= Barrie Jones (cricketer) =

New Zealand cricketer

Personal information
- Born: 7 August 1929; Whanganui, New Zealand
- Died: 4 April 2011 (aged 81); Whanganui, New Zealand
- Source: Cricinfo, 29 October 2020

Barrie Jones (7 August 1929 – 4 April 2011) was a New Zealand cricketer. He played in one first-class match for Central Districts in 1954/55.

== See also ==
- List of Central Districts representative cricketers
