= Duncan Cederman =

New Zealand cricketer (born 1978)

Personal information
- Full name: Duncan Robert Cederman
- Born: 10 October 1978 (age 48); Nelson, New Zealand
- Source: Cricinfo, 29 October 2020

Duncan Cederman (born 10 October 1978) is a New Zealand cricketer. He played in one first-class match for Central Districts in 2005.

== See also ==
- List of Central Districts representative cricketers
