= Davie Cooper (trade unionist) =

Scottish trade unionist

David John Cooper (July 15, 1939 – January 26, 2024) was a Scottish trade unionist.

== Biography ==
Born in Glasgow, Cooper faced early adversity with the death of his mother, Elizabeth (née Falconer), and his father's service in World War II. Raised by extended family, including an uncle who had fought with the International Brigades in the Spanish Civil War, Cooper's formative experiences shaped his socio-political beliefs.

Cooper attended North Kelvinside Secondary School and later apprenticed in marine engineering at Yarrow Shipbuilders, subsequently joining the merchant navy. This period reinforced his socialist convictions, particularly after witnessing the impact of apartheid during a port call in Cape Town.

Upon returning to the Govan shipyard, Cooper witnessed the decline of British shipbuilding, exacerbated by underinvestment and market shifts. The Geddes report of 1966 recommended consolidating shipyards into regional consortia, leading to the formation of Upper Clyde Shipbuilders (UCS) in 1968 with government backing. However, by 1971, UCS was in crisis following the exit of profit-making Yarrow Shipbuilders and reduced government support from the newly elected Conservative government.

Facing industry collapse, UCS workers, including many Communist Party members like Cooper, opted for a "work-in" instead of a strike to maintain operations. This action garnered extensive support, both locally and internationally, resulting in a government concession—a £35 million grant—after persistent advocacy and public solidarity campaigns.

Cooper remained at the shipyards through their various transformations until his retirement. He and his fellow UCS veterans left a legacy of effective labor organization, highlighted during the 50th anniversary of the work-in, underscoring the potential power of collective worker action.

Cooper was known for his staunch opposition to nationalism, which led to public disagreements with Jimmy Reid when Reid joined the Scottish National Party. His influence is noted in the survival of shipbuilding activities at the Clyde, operated by BAE Systems Surface Fleet Solutions, a development he attributed to the collective efforts of the workers.

== Personal life ==
He married Ann, a fellow trade unionist he met at a Glasgow Shop Stewards Committee meeting, and they had one son, David, who became an oil rig worker.
