= Tim Selwood =

Welsh-born English cricketer (1944–2021)

Personal information
- Born: 1 September 1944; Prestatyn, Flintshire, Wales
- Died: 10 February 2021 (aged 76)
- Batting: Right-handed
- Bowling: Right-arm medium
- Role: Opening batsman

Domestic team information
- Years: Team
- 1966–1972: Middlesex
- 1972/73: Central Districts
- FC debut: 27 July 1966 Middlesex v Somerset
- Last FC: 16 June 1973 Middlesex v Northamptonshire
- LA debut: 3 August 1969 Middlesex v Somerset
- Last LA: 17 June 1973 Middlesex v Northamptonshire

Career statistics
Competition	First-class	List A
Matches	20	12
Runs scored	603	133
Batting average	19.45	14.77
100s/50s	0/1	0/0
Top score	89	36
Catches/stumpings	9/–	1/–
- Source: Cricinfo, 29 May 2009

Timothy Selwood (1 September 1944 – 10 February 2021) was an English cricketer who played for Middlesex as an opening batsman between 1966 and 1973. He struggled at first-class level, failing to make a half-century for Middlesex, though he did make a career-best 89 during a one-off season for Central Districts in 1972–73. Selwood spent the remainder of his career playing for Middlesex's 2nd XI, as well as league and club cricket, before going on to coach Finchley Cricket Club in the Middlesex Premier League. His son, Steven, also played first-class cricket.
