= Ian Hampton =

New Zealand cricketer (1942–2025)

Personal information
- Full name: Ian Robert Hampton
- Born: 30 July 1942; Motueka, New Zealand
- Died: 27 November 2025 (aged 83)
- Source: Cricinfo

Ian Robert Hampton (30 July 1942 – 27 November 2025) was a New Zealand cricketer. He played in fourteen first-class matches for Central Districts from 1962 to 1966.

Hampton died on 27 November 2025, at the age of 83.

== See also ==
- List of Central Districts representative cricketers
