= Brad Patton (cricketer) =

New Zealand cricketer (born 1979)

Personal information
- Born: 9 November 1979 (age 47); Hastings, New Zealand
- Source: Cricinfo, 29 October 2020

Brad Patton (born 9 November 1979) is a New Zealand cricketer. He played in twenty-five first-class and seven List A matches for Central Districts from 2007 to 2011. Previously an elite batsman, now he gets a sore back after a short run.

== See also ==
- List of Central Districts representative cricketers
