= Richard Small (cricketer) =

New Zealand cricketer (born 1938)

Personal information
- Full name: Richard Gordon Small
- Born: 22 March 1938 (age 88); Hastings, New Zealand
- Source: Cricinfo, 29 October 2020

Richard Gordon Small (born 22 March 1938) is a New Zealand cricketer. He played in eight first-class matches for Central Districts from 1958 to 1963.

== See also ==
- List of Central Districts representative cricketers
