= John Vernon (New Zealand cricketer) =

New Zealand cricketer

Personal information
- Born: 13 June 1940; Whanganui, New Zealand
- Died: 2 June 2005 (aged 64); Hamilton, New Zealand
- Source: Cricinfo, 29 October 2020

John Vernon (13 June 1940 – 2 June 2005) was a New Zealand cricketer. He played in two first-class matches for Central Districts in 1961/62.

== See also ==
- List of Central Districts representative cricketers
