= Regan West =

Irish cricketer

Personal information
- Full name: Regan Morris West
- Born: 27 April 1979 (age 47); New Plymouth, Taranaki, New Zealand
- Batting: Left-handed
- Bowling: Left-arm fast medium; Slow left-arm orthodox
- Role: All-rounder
- Relatives: Gareth West (brother)

International information
- National side: Ireland
- ODI debut (cap 29): 25 August 2008 v Kenya
- Last ODI: 27 August 2009 v England
- T20I debut (cap 15): 8 June 2009 v Bangladesh
- Last T20I: 15 June 2009 v Pakistan

Domestic team information
- Years: Team
- 1995/96–2002/03: Taranaki
- 1996/97–1997/98: Central Districts
- 2000/01: Wellington
- 2003/04–2004/05: Central Districts

Career statistics
Competition	ODI	T20I	FC	LA
Matches	10	5	20	23
Runs scored	61	11	352	96
Batting average	30.50	3.66	18.52	13.71
100s/50s	0/0	0/0	0/0	0/0
Top score	29*	8	44*	29*
Balls bowled	447	114	3,432	1,052
Wickets	9	3	45	25
Bowling average	31.00	47.33	37.75	28.04
5 wickets in innings	0	0	1	1
10 wickets in match	0	0	0	0
Best bowling	4/26	1/23	7/88	5/26
Catches/stumpings	4/–	1/–	11/–	6/–
- Source: CricketArchive, 5 October 2024

Regan West (born 27 April 1979) is a New Zealand-born former Irish international cricketer. He played for Central Districts and Wellington in the State Championship in New Zealand. He bowled left-arm, either fast-medium or slow left arm orthodox, batted left-handed. Despite being born in New Zealand, West qualified to play for Ireland in late 2008 and made his first appearance for the team the same year. In 2011, West, at the age of 31, announced his retirement due to an injury to his left shoulder; his last match for Ireland was in August 2009.

== Career ==
=== New Zealand ===
Although he would later qualify for Ireland and represent them in international cricket, West began his professional cricketing career in New Zealand, the country of his birth. He made his first-class debut on 22 March 1997, aged 17. In the match, he represented Central Districts in a match against Northern Districts. Though he did not bat, West was line up to come in at number seven. He took 1 wicket in the match for 38 runs (1/38), that of Matthew Hart.

West's first taste of international cricket came in early 1998 when he represented New Zealand Under-19s in the Under-19 Cricket World Cup. He played all of his six Youth ODIs in the tournament. During the World Cup, he played alongside people such as James Franklin who went on to represent New Zealand in Tests and ODIs. From the 1996/97 season to the 2004/05 season, West played 13 first-class matches for Central Districts, scoring 211 runs at an average of 16.23 with a highest score of 44, and took 25 wickets at an average of 43.48. He also played one match for Wellington in the 2000/01 season, but went wicketless in the match.

=== Ireland ===
West was a member of Instonians in 2003 and in 2004 he moved to Bangor Cricket Club where he was the team's professional player for two seasons. He moved to Belfast after marrying a girl from Northern Ireland. As early as 2005, when he finished top of the Northern Cricket Union batting averages and was named Northern Ireland Player of the Year, there was speculation that West might play for Ireland. At the end of the 2005 season, West moved back to Instonians where he was a local player rather than a professional, stating "I enjoyed my two years at Bangor and made a lot of friends there, however, now that I am working full time [in an accountants' firm] and living in Belfast it seemed a natural move to come back to Instonians". During his second stint with Instonians, West was occasionally suffered disciplinary problems, and on his departure from the club to join Civil Service North at the end of 2007, West said "I don't want to see another disciplinary committee room. I am sick of it and they are probably sick of me". On signing West, the Civil Service North captain said "In Regan, we have signed a quality batsman and a quality bowler – indeed he is two players in one".

At the end of the 2008 season, West qualified to play for Ireland through residency. It was his intention to play for Ireland, and although he was not certain of selection he worked in his fitness in the off-season in the hope of being picked. Soon after qualifying, he made his debut for the team 25 August 2008. The match, a One Day International against Kenya, was not only his maiden international match and his first for Ireland, but his list A debut. The match was abandoned due to the weather before Ireland had a chance to bowl. West made his first-class debut for Ireland on 3 October the same year; the match was against Namibia in the 2007–08 ICC Intercontinental Cup. West did not bowl until Namibia's second innings and then only bowled two overs as Ireland bowled Namibia out cheaply in each innings. He did not bowl in ODIs until his second ODI which was on 18 October 2008, again against Kenya. He took 2/35 from 10 overs and his maiden wicket was that of batsman Rakep Patel.

In April 2009, West took his first five-wicket haul in one-day matches during the ICC World Cup Qualifier. In a match against the Oman national cricket team on 2 April, West took 5/26 in Ireland's 116-run victory, beating his previous best bowling figures in one-day matches of 2/35. Ireland won the tournament and West finished with 14 wickets at an average of 22.92 from 10 matches and was Ireland's second highest wicket-taker in the tournament. His haul of 7/88 in the first innings of the 2009 Intercontinental Cup clash against Scotland at Mannonfield in Aberdeen, is a record for Ireland in the competition and the best first-class return since Garfield Harrison's 9/113 against the same opposition in Edinburgh in 1990. West was one of seven Ireland players to be nominated for the 2009 Associate and Affiliate Player of the Year (there were fourteen nominees in all), although he did not make the 4-man short-list. For the summer of 2010, West was unable to play due to injury, and in his absence George Dockrell emerged as Ireland's premier spinner. West announced his retirement from international cricket in April 2011. His decision was caused by a serious injury to his left should; it was believed that he risked damaging it. Reflecting on his time playing for Ireland, West said "Being part of the Ireland team has been the highlight and most enjoyable time of my cricket career. I feel very privileged to have had the opportunity to represent Ireland, and it is sad for me that that is now over."
