= Andrew Paterson (cricketer) =

New Zealand cricketer (born 1947)

Personal information
- Born: 21 October 1947 (age 79); Wellington, New Zealand
- Source: Cricinfo, 29 October 2020

Andrew Paterson (born 21 October 1947) is a New Zealand cricketer. He played in one first-class match for Central Districts in 1973/74.

== See also ==
- List of Central Districts representative cricketers
