= Gary Robertson (cricketer) =

New Zealand cricketer (born 1960)

Personal information
- Full name: Gary Keith Robertson
- Born: 15 July 1960 (age 66); New Plymouth, New Zealand
- Batting: Right-handed
- Bowling: Right-arm fast-medium

International information
- National side: New Zealand (1986–1989)
- Only Test (cap 158): 13 March 1986 v Australia
- ODI debut (cap 39): 15 February 1981 v India
- Last ODI: 14 March 1989 v Pakistan

Career statistics
Competition	Test	ODI	FC	LA
Matches	1	10	88	69
Runs scored	12	49	1,875	757
Batting average	12.00	8.16	21.30	16.82
100s/50s	0/0	0/0	0/10	0/2
Top score	12	17	99*	58
Balls bowled	144	498	14,144	3,354
Wickets	1	6	252	78
Bowling average	91.00	53.50	29.63	27.58
5 wickets in innings	0	0	9	1
10 wickets in match	0	0	1	0
Best bowling	1/91	2/29	6/47	5/36
Catches/stumpings	0/–	2/–	22/–	10/–
- Source: Cricinfo, 4 February 2017

Gary Keith Robertson (born 15 July 1960) is a former New Zealand cricketer. He played one Test match and ten One Day Internationals for New Zealand.

Robertson also played for Taranaki in the Hawke Cup.

== Family ==
Robertson was born in New Plymouth. He has two children. He is the older brother of cricketer Stephen Robertson.

== See also ==
- One-Test wonder
