= Stephen Gill (cricketer) =

New Zealand cricketer (born 1957)

Personal information
- Born: 28 September 1957 (age 69); Nelson, New Zealand
- Source: Cricinfo, 29 October 2020

Stephen Gill (born 28 September 1957) is a New Zealand cricketer. He played in 20 first-class and 23 List A matches for Central Districts from 1981 to 1988.

== See also ==
- List of Central Districts representative cricketers
