= Gerald Rose (cricketer) =

New Zealand cricketer

Personal information
- Born: 11 April 1941; Palmerston North, New Zealand
- Died: 12 June 2007 (aged 66); Sydney, Australia
- Source: Cricinfo, 29 October 2020

Gerald Rose (11 April 1941–12 June 2007) was a New Zealand cricketer. He played in nine first-class matches for Central Districts and Northern Districts from 1958 to 1968.
