= Roald Badenhorst =

New Zealand cricketer (born 1991)

Personal information
- Full name: Roald Fourie Badenhorst
- Born: 13 May 1991 (age 35); Pretoria, South Africa
- Batting: Right-handed
- Bowling: Right-arm medium-fast

Domestic team information
- Years: Team
- 2011/12–2013/14: Central Districts
- 2014/15–2015/16: Otago
- FC debut: 20 November 2011 Central Districts v Canterbury
- Last FC: 24 October 2015 Otago v Canterbury
- LA debut: 9 March 2014 Central Districts v Canterbury
- Last LA: 26 March 2014 Central Districts v Otago

Career statistics
Competition	FC	LA	T20
Matches	15	2	3
Runs scored	296	14	21
Batting average	17.41	7.00	7.00
100s/50s	0/1	0/0	0/0
Top score	71	14	17
Balls bowled	2,008	72	–
Wickets	31	1	–
Bowling average	38.64	73.00	–
5 wickets in innings	0	0	–
10 wickets in match	0	0	–
Best bowling	3/28	1/53	–
Catches/stumpings	3/–	0/–	0/–
- Source: CricInfo, 31 December 2021

Roald Fourie Badenhorst (born 13 May 1991) is a South African-born New Zealand former cricketer.

Badenhorst was born at Pretoria in South Africa in 1991, the son of a high-level tennis player. His family moved to New Zealand in 2002 and Badencroft first played for Central Districts age-group teams in the 2007–08 season. He made his Hawke Cup debut for Manawatu in 2009–10 before making his first-class cricket debut for Central Districts in 2011–12.

Over three season Badenhorst played 11 first-class and two List A matches primarily as a bowler for Central Districts before moving to play for Otago for the 2014–15 season. Described as a "fringe player" who was brought into the team following good batting performances for his club team, Badenhorst played a further four first-class matches for the team as well as three Twenty20 matches in the Super Smash competition. He played club cricket for Albion Cricket Club in Dunedin and played for club teams in England.

An injury forced him to retire from top-level cricket and Badenhorst has since worked in the recruitment sector in Auckland.
