= Joseph Hill (cricketer) =

New Zealand cricketer (born 1976)

Personal information
- Born: 18 October 1976 (age 50); Blenheim, New Zealand
- Source: Cricinfo, 29 October 2020

Joseph Hill (born 18 October 1976) is a New Zealand cricketer. He played in eight first-class and four List A matches for Central Districts from 1999 to 2001.

== See also ==
- List of Central Districts representative cricketers
