= Roderick Thomas =

New Zealand cricketer (born 1954)

Personal information
- Born: 14 February 1954 (age 72); Picton, New Zealand
- Source: Cricinfo, 29 October 2020

Roderick Thomas (born 14 February 1954) is a New Zealand cricketer. He played in sixteen first-class and three List A matches for Central Districts from 1975 to 1978.

== See also ==
- List of Central Districts representative cricketers
