= Warren Murdock =

New Zealand cricketer

Personal information
- Full name: Warren Thomas Murdock
- Born: 12 January 1944; New Plymouth, New Zealand
- Died: 17 November 2014 (aged 70); Taupō, New Zealand
- Batting: Right-handed
- Role: Batsman

Domestic team information
- Years: Team
- 1962/63–1974/75: Central Districts
- FC debut: 10 January 1963 Central Districts v Northern Districts
- Last FC: 18 January 1975 Central Districts v Wellington
- Only LA: 28 March 1974 Central Districts v Australians

Career statistics
Competition	First-class	List A
Matches	12	1
Runs scored	473	12
Batting average	23.65	12.00
100s/50s	0/2	0/0
Top score	55	12
Balls bowled	32	–
Wickets	0	–
Bowling average	–	–
5 wickets in innings	–	–
10 wickets in match	–	–
Best bowling	–	–
Catches/stumpings	5/–	1/–
- Source: CricketArchive, 4 June 2009

Warren Thomas Murdock (12 January 1944 – 17 November 2014) was a New Zealand cricketer, born in New Plymouth, Taranaki, who played for Central Districts cricket team from 1962 to 1975. He also played for New Zealand's under-23s – scoring 46 runs from one match at 23.00 – as well as Hawke Cup cricket between 1960 and 1982 for Taranaki, Manawatu, Horowhenua, Wairarapa and Midlands.
