= Eric Austin (cricketer) =

New Zealand cricketer (born 1974)

Personal information
- Born: 5 April 1974 (age 52); Whanganui, New Zealand
- Source: Cricinfo, 29 October 2020

Eric Austin (born 5 April 1974) is a New Zealand cricketer. He played in seven first-class and five List A matches for Central Districts from 1995 to 1997.

== See also ==
- List of Central Districts representative cricketers
