= Barrie Jones (photographer) =

Canadian photographer and educator

Barrie Jones, RCA (born circa 1955) is a Canadian photographer and art educator based in Vancouver, British Columbia. He studied at the University of British Columbia and York University. He was a photography instructor in the department of Art History, Visual Art and Theory at the University of British Columbia. In 2016, Jones was inducted into the Royal Canadian Academy of Art.

In 2017 his work was included in the exhibition Pictures From Here at the Vancouver Art Gallery.

In 2025, upon being nominated by the RCA, he was awarded the King Charles III Coronation Medal for his significant contribution to the arts.

== Collections ==
Jones' work is in the collection of the National Gallery of Canada, the Art Gallery of Windsor, the British Columbia Government Collection, and the York University Art Collection,
