= Leslie Sheffield =

Australian geneticist

Associate Professor Leslie Sheffield is an Australian geneticist who led the creation of the Down syndrome screening program in Melbourne.

He has conducted research on personalised medicine.
