= Gareth West =

New Zealand cricketer

Personal information
- Full name: Gareth Lawrence West
- Born: 26 July 1976 (age 50); New Plymouth, Taranaki, New Zealand
- Batting: Left-handed
- Bowling: Left-arm fast-medium
- Role: Bowler
- Relatives: Regan West (brother)

Domestic team information
- Years: Team
- 2000/01: Central Districts
- 2002/03–2003/04: Northern Districts
- FC debut: 3 November 2000 Central Districts v Wellington
- Last FC: 26 February 2004 Northern Districts v Canterbury
- LA debut: 17 December 2000 Central Districts v Wellington
- Last LA: 18 January 2004 Northern Districts v Auckland

Career statistics
Competition	First-class	List A
Matches	15	11
Runs scored	76	30
Batting average	5.06	15.00
100s/50s	0/0	0/0
Top score	31	12*
Balls bowled	2,261	504
Wickets	36	10
Bowling average	31.72	43.20
5 wickets in innings	0	0
10 wickets in match	0	0
Best bowling	4/23	3/41
Catches/stumpings	3/–	2/–
- Source: CricInfo, 2 May 2009

Gareth Lawrence West (born 26 July 1976) is a former New Zealand cricketer who played 26 matches in total from 2000 to 2004.

== Early life ==
West was born in July 1976 at New Plymouth in Taranaki, New Zealand. West, along with his brother Regan West, had mixed Irish and New Zealand heritage, enabling Regan to represent Ireland in One Day and Twenty20 Internationals during his own career.

== Career ==
A left-arm fast-medium bowler, West took 36 wickets in 15 first-class cricket matches at 31.72, and 10 more wickets in List-A matches at a weaker 43.20. A bowler rather than a batsman, he only made 76 runs in his first-class career at 5.06, with a career best of 31. In one day matches he was only required to bat seven times from his 11 matches, and five not outs rose his average to 15.00.

He played his first match for Central Districts on 3 November 2000, against Wellington at Marton. He took 1/18 in the first innings, failing to take a wicket in the second, and was not called to bat at all. He went on to play five more matches during this first season, scoring only 21 runs at 4.20, but took 14 wickets at 29.07. He also played three one day matches, scoring 11 runs at 5.50, and taking six wickets at 22.83.

West went on to play only four more four-day matches across the 2002–03 season, enjoying another weak season with the bat: scoring only 35 runs, 31 of which in one innings which inflated his average to 17.50. With the ball he took 12 wickets at 31.91. He played five more one day matches, scoring 16 runs largely in one innings of 12*, however only took one wicket at 196.00. He played a further six first-class matches in 2003–04, scoring 20 runs at 2.50, and taking 10 wickets at 34.70. In one day cricket he only scored 4 runs from three matches, and took three wickets at 33.00. His final match, on 26 February 2004 against Canterbury, saw him score one with the bat, and take one wicket.
