= Stephen Robertson (cricketer) =

New Zealand cricketer (born 1963)

Personal information
- Born: 21 October 1963 (age 63); New Plymouth, New Zealand
- Source: Cricinfo, 29 October 2020

Stephen Robertson (born 21 October 1963) is a New Zealand cricketer. He played in 13 first-class and 21 List A matches for Central Districts from 1985 to 1991.

== See also ==
- List of Central Districts representative cricketers
