= Scott Baldwin (cricketer) =

New Zealand cricketer (born 1983)

Scott Baldwin (19 November 1983) was a New Zealand cricketer. He was a right-handed batsman and right-arm medium-pace bowler who played for Central Districts. He was born in Wanganui.

Baldwin, who made his cricketing debut during the 2002–03 season with the Under-19s Central Districts cricket team, made a single first-class appearance for the senior side during the 2006–07 season, against Auckland. From the lower-middle order, he scored a duck in both innings in which he batted. He bowled 24 overs in the match, taking a single wicket.
