= David Cooper (New Zealand cricketer) =

New Zealand cricketer (born 1972)

Personal information
- Full name: David Mark Cooper
- Born: 18 February 1972 (age 54); Wanganui, New Zealand
- Batting: Right-handed
- Bowling: Right-arm slow-medium

Domestic team information
- Years: Team
- 1988/89–2000/01: Wanganui
- 1993/94–1996/97: Central Districts
- Source: Cricinfo, 4 April 2016

David Mark Cooper (born 18 February 1972) is a New Zealand cricket administrator and former cricketer. He played four first-class and seven List A matches for Central Districts between the 1993–94 and 1996–97 seasons.

Cooper was born at Wanganui in 1977. He played Hawke Cup cricket for Wanganui from the 1988–89 season before making his senior debut for Central Districts in January 1994. He scored 48 first-class and 56 List A runs in his 11 senior appearances for the side.

Following his playing career, Cooper worked as the chief executive of Northern Districts Cricket Association for eight years before taking the role of general manager, domestic cricket for New Zealand Cricket in 2012.
