= Carl Crafar =

New Zealand cricketer (born 1964)

Personal information
- Full name: Carl Antony Crafar
- Born: 18 November 1964 (age 61); Wanganui, New Zealand
- Batting: Right-handed
- Bowling: Right-arm medium

Domestic team information
- Years: Team
- 1986/87: Central Districts

Career statistics
| Competition | First-class | List A |
|---|---|---|
| Matches | 1 | 5 |
| Runs scored | – | 7 |
| Batting average | – | 3.50 |
| 100s/50s | – | 0/0 |
| Top score | – | 4 |
| Balls bowled | 84 | 162 |
| Wickets | 0 | 5 |
| Bowling average | – | 26.0 |
| 5 wickets in innings | – | 0 |
| 10 wickets in match | – | 0 |
| Best bowling | – | 3/22 |
| Catches/stumpings | 0/– | 0/– |
- Source: Cricinfo, 26 February 2010

Carl Antony Crafar (born 18 November 1964) is a former New Zealand cricketer who played for the Central Districts Stags in the 1986–87 season. He also played for Wanganui in the Hawke Cup. He was born at Wanganui in 1964 and worked as a civil servant.
