= John Furlong (cricketer) =

New Zealand cricketer (born 1972)

Personal information
- Born: 28 June 1972 (age 54); Napier, New Zealand
- Source: Cricinfo, 29 October 2020

John Furlong (born 28 June 1972) is a New Zealand cricketer. He played in four first-class matches for Central Districts from 1990 to 1994.

== See also ==
- List of Central Districts representative cricketers
