= Rodney Brown (cricketer) =

New Zealand cricketer (born 1968)

Rodney Kirk Brown (born 1 February 1968 in New Plymouth) is a former New Zealand cricketer who played for Central Districts and Taranaki in the Hawke Cup.
