= David Leonard (cricketer) =

New Zealand cricketer (born 1965)

David John Leonard (born 25 November 1965) is a former New Zealand cricketer who played for Central Districts. In 1989–90 Leonard took 10 for 133 for the Central Districts against Northern Districts in Rotorua on his first-class debut. He was born in Timaru.

In February 2020, he was named in New Zealand's squad for the Over-50s Cricket World Cup in South Africa. However, the tournament was cancelled during the third round of matches due to the coronavirus pandemic.
