= Paul Unwin (cricketer) =

New Zealand cricketer (born 1967)

Personal information
- Full name: Paul David Unwin
- Born: 9 June 1967 (age 59); Waipawa, Hawke's Bay, New Zealand
- Batting: Right-handed
- Bowling: Right-arm off-break

Domestic team information
- Years: Team
- 1986/87–1992/93: Central Districts
- 1989: Somerset
- 1993/94: Canterbury

Career statistics
Competition	First-class	List A
Matches	34	24
Runs scored	358	154
Batting average	13.76	17.11
100s/50s	0/0	0/0
Top score	38	25*
Balls bowled	5,416	678
Wickets	65	19
Bowling average	43.73	24.15
5 wickets in innings	1	0
10 wickets in match	1	0
Best bowling	6/42	3/16
Catches/stumpings	32/–	11/–
- Source: CricketArchive, 22 December 2015

Paul David Unwin (born 9 June 1967) is a New Zealand former first-class cricketer who played for Central Districts and Canterbury in New Zealand and for one season for Somerset in England. He was born at Waipawa, Hawke's Bay.

A right-arm off-spin bowler and a right-handed lower order batsman, Unwin played first-class and List A cricket for Central Districts regularly from the 1986–87 season to 1989–90, reappeared for the side in 1992–93 and then had a single season with Canterbury in 1993–94. His outstanding match was the game between Central Districts and Otago at Palmerston North in 1988–89, when he took six Otago wickets for 42 runs in the first innings and followed that up with four more in the second to finish with match figures of 10 for 152. In no other innings did Unwin take five wickets and his highest score as a batsman was just 38.

Unwin appeared once for Somerset in the tour match against the Australians in 1989: he took five wickets in the match. According to Wisden Cricketers' Almanack, Unwin was on an "exchange" between Central Districts and Somerset. He played eight matches for Somerset's second team in the Second Eleven Championship and took 32 wickets in them.
