= Campbell Smith (cricketer) =

New Zealand cricketer (born 1960)

Campbell John Poore Smith (born 21 March 1960), sometimes known as John Smith, is a former New Zealand cricketer who played 62 first-class and 22 List A matches for Central Districts between 1984 and 1991. He also played for Nelson in the Hawke Cup. Smith was born in Nelson.
