= John Wiltshire (cricketer) =

New Zealand cricketer (born 1952)

Personal information
- Full name: John Robert Wiltshire
- Born: 20 January 1952 (age 74); Christchurch, New Zealand
- Batting: Right-handed
- Bowling: Right-arm medium
- Role: Batsman

Domestic team information
- Years: Team
- 1974/75–1980/81: Auckland
- 1981/82–1983/84: Central Districts

Career statistics
Competition	First-class	List A
Matches	54	29
Runs scored	2422	695
Batting average	31.05	28.95
100s/50s	2/10	0/6
Top score	105	83
Balls bowled	14	–
Wickets	0	–
Bowling average	–	–
5 wickets in innings	–	–
10 wickets in match	–	–
Best bowling	–	–
Catches/stumpings	25/–	15/–
- Source: CricInfo, 5 June 2009

John Robert Wiltshire (born 20 January 1952) is a former New Zealand first-class cricketer who played for Auckland and Central Districts between 1974 and 1984.

Wiltshire is a lawyer at Base Law.
