= List of Auckland representative cricketers =

This is a list of cricketers who have played first–class, list A or Twenty20 cricket for the Auckland cricket team in New Zealand. Seasons given are the first and last seasons the player appeared for the team in a senior match; the player did not necessarily play in all the intervening seasons.

As of 8 November 2025

== A ==
- John Ackland, 1980/81–1983/84
- Andre Adams, 1997/98–2012/13
- James Adams, 2010/11–2011/12
- Stephen Adams, 1982/83–1984/85
- John Aiken, 1999/00–2000/01
- R. A. Aitken, 1980/81 (Note: Aitken, who is thought to have been born in 1959, played age-group and B team cricket for Auckland between 1979–80 and 1981–82 as well as against Northland in a non-first-class match. His three List A appearances for the provincial team all came during the 1980–81 season. He scored a total of 90 runs, including a highest score of 54, and took a single wicket. No other biographical details are known.)
- Cyril Allcott, 1921/22–1931/32
- Finn Allen, 2016/17–2024/25
- Samuel Alpe, 1873/74
- Corey Anderson, 2019/20
- David Andersen, 1960/61
- James Anderson, 2007/08
- Cody Andrews, 2016/17
- Frederick Andrews, 1935/36–1940/41
- Gene Andrews, 2005/06
- John Ansenne, 1893/94
- Arnold Anthony, 1909/10–1930/31
- Robert Arblaster, 1976/77–1979/80
- John Arneil, 1882/83–1893/94
- Adithya Ashok, 2021/22–2025/26
- Dean Askew, 1997/98
- Azhar Abbas, 2007/08–2008/09
- Azhar Mahmood, 2011/12–2012/13

== B ==
- Rex Baddeley, 1969/70–1971/72
- Sydney Badeley, 1929/30
- Thomas Ball, 1894/95–1896/97
- Frederick Barclay, 1902/03–1903/04
- Aaron Barnes, 1993/94–2004/05
- Brian Barrett, 1985/86
- Michael Barry, 2012/13–2018/19
- Dean Bartlett, 2009/10–2014/15
- Hamish Barton, 1995/96–1997/98
- William Barton, 1882/83–1886/87
- Jonathon Bassett-Graham, 2009/10
- Michael Bates, 2003/04–2015/16
- William Beard, 1886/87
- Graeme Beghin, 2017/18–2021/22
- John Behrent, 1963/64–1967/68
- Bill Bell, 1952/53
- George Bellars, 1873/74
- Daniel Bell-Drummond, 2018/19
- Sel Belsham, 1953/54–1958/59
- Richard Bennett, 1975/76
- Percy Beveridge, 1918/19 (Note: Beveridge (1875 – 31 July 1947) was born in the Sydney suburb of Glebe. He made his first-class cricket debut for Auckland in February 1919 at the age of 43 or 44. He scored 93 not out and 24 against Wellington in his second match, which Auckland won, but he never played again.)
- Bhupinder Singh, 2009/10–2013/14
- Ian Billcliff, 1997/98–1998/99
- Robert Blair, 1882/83–1883/84
- Jim Blandford, 1939/40–1940/41
- James Blane, 1949/50
- Bruce Bodle, 1958/59
- Ravi Bopara, 2009/10
- Charles Bowden, 1883/84
- Ted Bowley, 1926/27–1928/29
- John Bracewell, 1982/83–1989/90
- Mark Bradley, 1987/88
- Martin Bradley, 1985/86–1987/88
- Richard Brazendale, 1983/84
- Cole Briggs, 2020/21–2023/24
- J. F. Brook, 1913/14 (Note: All three of Brook's matches for Auckland came in early 1914 after he was chosen for the team after playing cricket in Whangārei. He made his provincial debut against Canterbury in January and after playing against Wellington later in the month he made his final appearance for Auckland the following month against the touring Australians. He scored a total of 117 runs and took one wicket. Other than a surname and initials no biographical details are known.)
- Victor Brooker, 1947/48–1948/49
- William Brook-Smith, 1904/05–1922/23
- Chris Brown, 1993/94–1997/98
- Jamie Brown, 2017/18–2019/20
- Kyle Brown, 1992/93
- Steve Brown, 1987/88–1994/95
- Vaughan Brown, 1987/88–1989/90
- William Brown, 1944/45–1954/55
- Frank Buckland, 1873/74–1882/83
- Gordon Burgess, 1940/41–1954/55
- Mark Burgess, 1966/67–1979/80
- Ces Burke, 1937/38–1953/54
- Herbert Burton, 1922/23–1923/24
- Ronald Bush, 1932/33–1934/35
- William Bush, 1910/11
- Keith Butler, 1953/54
- Frederick Byerley, 1931/32

== C ==
- Brad Cachopa, 2010/11–2016/17
- Carl Cachopa, 2004/05–2014/15
- Craig Cachopa, 2012/13–2019/20
- Jonathan Cain, 1994/95
- Matt Cairns, 2001/02
- Edward Cakobau, 1930/31
- James Cammish, 1950/51
- Tama Canning, 1999/00–2006/07
- William Carlton, 1899/00
- Randall Carrington, 1953/54
- John Carson, 1963/64–1973/74
- Bill Carson, 1936/37–1939/40
- Mark Chapman, 2015/16–2024/25
- Ellis Child, 1953/54
- Charles Clark, 1913/14
- Alan Clark, 1959/60–1961/62
- Michael Clark, 1992/93–1996/97
- Trevor Clark, 1931/32
- Don Clarke, 1950/51–1954/55
- Charles Clayforth, 1873/74
- Daniel Clayton, 1894/95–1902/03
- Ossie Cleal, 1940/41–1951/52
- Robert Cleave, 1933/34–1944/45
- Don Cleverley, 1930/31–1950/51
- Robert Coates, 1917/18–1923/24
- Donald Coleman, 1948/49–1957/58
- Guy Coleman, 2001/02
- Henry Colson, 1877/78
- Ivan Cooper, 1924/25–1927/28
- Henry Cooper, 1941/42–1943/44
- Edward Cotterill, 1895/96
- Henry Cotton, 1873/74–1877/78
- Jack Cowie, 1932/33–1949/50
- Sidney Coxon, 1884/85
- Terry Crabb, 1997/98–2001/02
- Steven Croft, 2008/09
- Jeff Crowe, 1982/83–1991/92
- Martin Crowe, 1979/80–1982/83
- William Crump, 1947/48
- Leonard Cuff, 1896/97
- George Cummings, 1907/08–1922/23
- Bob Cunis, 1960/61–1974/75
- Sam Curran, 2017/18
- John Cushen, 1976/77–1982/83

== D ==
- Ces Dacre, 1914/15–1932/33
- Life Dacre, 1912/13–1913/14
- Heath Davis, 2002/03–2003/04
- Allan Deane, 1947/48
- Ken Deas, 1947/48–1960/61
- Andrew de Boorder, 2007/08–2011/12
- Derek de Boorder, 2005/06
- Colin de Grandhomme, 2006/07–2017/18
- Richard de Groen, 1987/88–1989/90
- Louis Delport, 2017/18–2024/25
- Aravinda de Silva, 1996/97
- Albert Dewes, 1882/83–1883/84
- Siddhesh Dixit, 2024/25–2025/26
- Ernest Dixon, 1873/74
- Keith Dollery, 1949/50
- John Donaldson, 1949/50
- Ian Donnelly, 1981/82
- Michael Dormer, 1961/62
- Richard Drown, 1991/92–1992/93
- Chris Drum, 1996/97–2001/02
- Edmund Dufaur, 1873/74–1877/78
- Percy Dufaur, 1882/83
- Eric Dunn, 1955/56–1956/57
- Ted Dunning, 1936/37
- Jack Dunning, 1928/29
- Kevin Dwyer, 1950/51–1953/54
- Ross Dykes, 1967/68–1976/77

== E ==
- David Edmonds, 1933/34–1946/47
- Thomas Elliott, 1894/95–1905/06
- Leonard Elliott, 1924/25–1929/30
- Howard Ellis, 1911/12
- Norman Ellis, 1941/42–1943/44
- Ray Emery, 1936/37–1946/47
- Wayne Enoka, 1997/98
- Pieter Erasmus, 2006/07–2009/10
- James Everest, 1954/55–1955/56
- George Ewing, 1884/85

== F ==
- Ray Farman, 1957/58–1959/60
- William Fenton, 1971/72
- Lockie Ferguson, 2012/13–2024/25
- Danru Ferns, 2016/17–2024/25
- Aaron Finch, 2012/13
- Charles Finlayson, 1929/30–1930/31
- Ian Fisher, 1982/83–1992/93
- Cam Fletcher, 2023/24–2025/26
- James Forrest, 1996/97–1997/98
- John Fowke, 1889/90–1893/94
- Bill Fowler, 1981/82–1989/90
- Scott Francis, 1994/95
- Trevor Franklin, 1980/81–1992/93
- Robert Frater, 1918/19–1931/32
- Tipene Friday, 2013/14
- James Fuller, 2013/14–2015/16

== G ==
- William Gardiner, 1889/90–1893/94
- Cecil Gardner, 1882/83
- Raoul Garrard, 1917/18–1941/42
- Wilson Garrard, 1918/19–1924/25
- Graham Gedye, 1956/57–1964/65
- James Gerrard, 1924/25–1926/27
- Grant Gibson, 1972/73
- Matt Gibson, 2022/23–2024/25
- Eric Giles, 1960/61
- John Gill, 1882/83–1884/85
- Hector Gillespie, 1920/21–1931/32
- Stu Gillespie, 1984/85–1988/89
- Charles Gleeson, 1877/78
- William Goode, 1909/10
- Robert Gordon, 1912/13
- Ian Gould, 1979/80
- Bernard Graham, 1953/54
- William Graham, 1917/18–1918/19
- Mark Greatbatch, 1982/83–1985/86
- Lindsay Green, 1959/60–1961/62
- Norman Grenier, 1912/13
- Trevor Grierson, 1877/78
- Donovan Grobbelaar, 2012/13–2018/19
- Rohit Gulati, 2025/26
- Martin Guptill, 2005/06–2024/25
- Michael Guptill-Bunce, 2012/13–2018/19

== H ==
- Alf Hadden, 1905/06–1910/11
- Dusan Hakaraia, 2010/11–2012/13
- Thomas Hambrook, 1951/52–1958/59
- George Hampton, 1932/33
- Joe Hardstaff, 1948/49–1949/50
- Noel Harford, 1963/64–1966/67
- Roy Harford, 1965/66–1967/68
- John Harkness, 1892/93
- Roger Harris, 1955/56–1973/74
- Hubert Harrison, 1940/41–1943/44
- Ryan Harrison, 2020/21–2025/26
- Walter Harvie, 1914/15
- Mark Haslam, 1991/92–2002/03
- William Hawkins, 1886/87–1896/97
- Stuart Hay, 1931/32
- Douglas Hay, 1893/94–1906/07
- Carlton Hay, 1893/94
- Simon Hayden, 1996/97
- Johnny Hayes, 1946/47–1958/59
- Gareth Hayne, 2006/07–2007/08
- G. Hayward, 1910/11 (Note: A wicket-keeper, Hayward played two first-class matches for Auckland in 1910–11. He took two catches and scored a single run against Wellington on debut in December, before taking a single catch and not scoring in either of his innings against Canterbury at the end of January. Other than a surname and initial no biographical details are known.)
- William Hayward, 1935/36
- Tom Hellaby, 1979/80–1987/88
- Ronald Hemi, 1950/51
- Francis Hemmingson, 1945/46–1949/50
- Lancelot Hemus, 1904/05–1921/22
- Bill Hendy, 1927/28
- Graeme Hick, 1997/98
- Shawn Hicks, 2015/16–2016/17
- Donald Hill, 1967/68
- Ronnie Hira, 2006/07–2019/20
- Paul Hitchcock, 1997/98–2008/09
- Brad Hodge, 2012/13
- Rowland Holle, 1893/94
- John Hollywood, 1947/48–1949/50
- Glen Hook, 1935/36–1936/37
- Rex Hooton, 1979/80
- Gareth Hopkins, 2007/08–2013/14
- Ben Horne, 2016/17–2022/23
- Matt Horne, 1992/93–2005/06
- Phil Horne, 1979/80–1990/91
- Nick Horsley, 2001/02
- Ernest Horspool, 1909/10–1928/29
- Ken Hough, 1957/58–1959/60
- Alan Hounsell, 1973/74
- Patrick Hounsell, 1987/88–1988/89
- Dave Houpapa, 2006/07–2007/08
- Geoff Howarth, 1972/73–1973/74
- Hedley Howarth, 1963/64–1978/79
- Alister Howden, 1906/07–1914/15
- Llorne Howell, 1999/00–2003/04
- John Howlett, 1891/92
- Alan Hunt, 1981/82–1992/93
- Horace Hunt, 1929/30–1930/31
- Raymond Hunter, 1975/76–1984/85
- James Hussey, 1904/05–1907/08
- Dane Hutchinson, 2016/17

== I ==
- Peter Iles, 1946/47–1951/52
- Alexander Irving, 1917/18–1923/24
- Richard Irving, 1995/96–2000/01

== J ==
- Charlie Jackman, 1937/38–1941/42
- Bert Jacobs, 1893/94
- Bevon Jacobs, 2024/25–2025/26
- Kyle Jamieson, 2019/20–2022/23
- Terry Jarvis, 1964/65–1976/77
- Vishi Jeet, 2014/15
- Harjot Johal, 2023/24–2024/25
- A. O. Jones, 1911/12 (Note: Jones played twice for Auckland during the 1911–12 season. He made his debut against Otago at Carisbrook in mid-February 1912 before playing his second match later in the month against Wellington at the Basin Reserve. Primarily a bowler, he took four first-class wickets, including 3/30 on debut, and scored a total of 20 runs in three innings. Other than a surname and initials no biographical details are known.)
- Gregory Jones, 1976/77
- Richard Jones, 1992/93–2009/10
- Sammy Jones, 1904/05–1908/09

== K ==
- Jocelyn Kallender, 1893/94–1904/05
- Harrish Kannan, 2025/26
- John Kasper, 1966/67–1978/79
- Vivian Kavanagh, 1912/13
- Simon Keene, 2021/22–2025/26
- Felix Kelly, 1889/90–1897/98
- Paul Kelly, 1981/82–1989/90
- John Kemp, 1960/61–1969/70
- Leonard Kent, 1943/44–1951/52
- Alec Kerr, 1906/07–1912/13
- Allen Kerr, 1941/42–1945/46
- Charles King, 1893/94
- George King, 1873/74
- Richard King, 1996/97–2002/03
- Herbert Kissling, 1889/90
- Anaru Kitchen, 2008/09–2014/15
- David Knowles, 1983/84
- Sebastian Kohlhase, 1968/69–1969/70

== L ==
- Andrew Labatt, 1897/98
- Jim Laker, 1951/52
- James Langridge, 1927/28
- George Lankham, 1873/74
- William Lankham, 1882/83–1883/84
- Henry Lawson, 1891/92–1897/98
- Chris Lee, 1993/94–1996/97 (Note: Lee, who was born at Wellington in 1971, played Hawke Cup cricket for Horowhenua in 1988–89 and 1989–90, for Central Districts age-group teams, and was a member of the New Zealand development squad. He made his first-class debut for Wellington in February 1992, substituting for Gavin Larsen who had been called in to the New Zealand national team. he took a single wicket in the only innings in which he played. He played again for Wellington the following season, before moving to play for Auckland between 1993–94 and 1996–97, making six first-class and five List A appearances for the team. He also played a first-class match for a New Zealand XI against the touring Pakistan team in 1993–94. He took a total of 18 first-class wickets and scored 174 runs, including a top score of 111 not out made against Otago in 1994–95, again in a match in which he appeared as a substitute, this time for Dipak Patel who had also been called in to the New Zealand team. His previous highest first-class score was 17 runs.)
- Max Lewis, 1949/50 (Note: Lewis played wartime cricket for Auckland teams, before making his only first-class appearance in 1949–50. He made scores of three and nine against Wellington at Eden Park. Born at Auckland in 1923, he died at the city in 1985. An obituary was published in the 1986 edition of the New Zealand Cricket Almanack.)
- Warren Linn, 1980/81
- Johnathan Lintott, 1997/98–1998/99 (Note: Lintott, who was born at Auckland in 1973, played four List A matches for the team, three in 1997–98 and one the following season, taking two wickets. He also played Hawke Cup cricket for Auckland-Waitakere in 1997–98.)
- Allen Lissette, 1954/55–1955/56
- Ben Lister, 2017/18–2025/26
- Tom Lowry, 1917/18
- Mal Loye, 2006/07
- John Lundon, 1892/93–1893/94
- Harold Lusk, 1899/00–1920/21
- Hugh Lusk, 1889/90
- Newell Lusk, 1899/00–1903/04
- Dan Lynch, 1877/78–1889/90
- Robert Lynch, 2001/02–2002/03 (Note: The brother of Stephen Lynch, Robert Lynch played age-group cricket for Auckland, under-19 cricket for New Zealand, and Second XI cricket in England for MCC Young Cricketers, before making his first-class debut for Auckland against Wellington in March 2002. He made scores of 13 and 20 on debut and played once more for the representative team the following season, scoring two and five against Central Districts. Born at Auckland in 1982, he was educated at Auckland Grammar School in the city.)
- Stephen Lynch, 1995/96–1999/00
- Brendan Lyon, 1997/98 (Note: A wicket-keeper, Lyon played three first-class and six List A matches for Auckland during the 1997–98 season, having previously played age-group matches for the team. He was born at Auckland in 1975.)
- Trevor Lyon, 1931/32
- Tim Lythe, 2005/06–2006/07

== M ==
- Nathan McAndrew, 2015/16
- Mitchell McClenaghan 2011/12–2019/20
- Charles MacCormick, 1884/85–1893/94
- Evan MacCormick, 1900/01–1913/14
- Bill McCoy, 1929/30–1934/35
- John McDonald, 1956/57–1957/58
- Matt McEwan, 2017/18–2019/20
- Peter McGregor, 1960/61–1964/65
- Flynn McGregor-Sumpter, 2021/22
- Tim McIntosh, 1998/99–2013/14
- John McIntyre, 1961/62–1982/83
- Andy McKay, 2002/03–2008/09
- Jock McKenzie, 2023/24–2025/26
- Robb MacKinlay, 1986/87
- Eddie McLeod, 1920/21–1923/24
- Len McMahon, 1908/09
- Noel McMahon, 1936/37–1937/38
- William McMath, 1917/18–1918/19
- Norman McMillan, 1931/32
- Frank McNeill, 1905/06
- Robert McPherson, 1889/90
- Cameron Maingay, 1970/71–1971/72
- Raj Majithia, 2018/19 (Note: Born at Ahmedabad in India in 1997, Majithia played age-group cricket for Gujarat and captained the Ahmedabad under-19 team. He was educated at St Kabir School before moving to New Zealand where he played for the Auckland A team between 2017–18 and 2019–20. He made a single List A appearance for the senior Auckland team, scoring two runs opening the batting against Central Districts in November 2018.)
- John Marsdon, 1948/49–1959/60
- Patrick Marshall, 1900/01
- Robert Marshall, 1936/37
- Bruce Martin, 2010/11–2013/14
- Chris Martin, 2005/06–2012/13
- Dick Mason, 1902/03–1914/15
- Mal Matheson, 1926/27–1939/40
- Richard Matthews, 1969/70–1975/76
- David Mayall, 1913/14
- Stuart Meaker, 2017/18
- Alexander Meldrum, 1886/87–1889/90
- David Meldrum, 1892/93
- William Meldrum, 1884/85–1886/87
- Cedric Metge, 1923/24–1924/25
- Ted Meuli, 1945/46
- Frederick Middleton, 1917/18
- Frederick Midlane, 1917/18–1918/19
- David Millener, 1964/65–1967/68
- David Miller, 1892/93
- Edward Mills, 1884/85–1886/87
- George Mills, 1886/87–1899/00
- Isaac Mills, 1889/90–1903/04
- Jason Mills, 1991/92–1998/99
- John Mills, 1924/25–1937/38
- Kyle Mills, 1998/99–2014/15
- Tymal Mills, 2016/17
- William Mills, 1900/01–1903/04
- Leslie Monteith, 1924/25
- Archer Moresby, 1889/90–1893/94
- Greg Morgan, 2007/08–2009/10
- Richard Morgan, 1998/99–2002/03
- Ross Morgan, 1957/58–1976/77
- John Morris, 1951/52–1956/57
- Peter Morris, 1961/62–1962/63
- Andrew Morrison, 2020/21
- Danny Morrison, 1985/86–1996/97
- Ross Morrison, 1965/66–1966/67
- Herbert Moyle, 1950/51–1956/57
- Riley Mudford, 2024/25 (Note: Mudford had previously played Twenty20 cricket in Ireland for Leinster Lightning during 2023.)
- Jonathan Mumford, 1873/74–1877/78
- Colin Munro, 2006/07–2020/21
- Phil Mustard, 2012/13

== N ==
- Chris Nash, 2013/14
- Dion Nash, 1998/99–2001/02
- Don Neely, 1968/69–1970/71
- James Neesham, 2009/10–2025/26
- Robert Neill, 1889/90–1905/06
- Thomas Neill, 1892/93–1897/98
- Tarun Nethula, 2008/09–2017/18
- Peter Neutze, 1987/88–1988/89
- J. A. Nicholson, 1893/94 (Note: Nicholson played a single match for Auckland against a touring New South Wales team in January 1894. He scored eight not out in his first innings and four in his second. Other than a surname and initials no biographical information is known.)
- Rob Nicol, 2001/02–2016/17
- Teja Nidamanuru, 2017/18–2018/19
- Bradley Nielsen, 2001/02–2002/03 (Note: Born at Auckland in 1970, Nielsen played seven first-class and one List A match for the team, taking six first-class wickets and scoring 135 runs. He made his senior debut in March 2002 against Canterbury, before playing all of his other representative matches for Auckland the following season.)
- William Norman, 1959/60–1962/63
- Harold Nottman, 1941/42

== O ==
- Adolphus O'Brien, 1882/83–1889/90
- Robert O'Donnell, 2013/14–2023/24
- William O'Donnell, 2018/19–2024/25
- Alex O'Dowd, 1991/92–1993/94
- Max O'Dowd, 2022/23
- Frederick Ohlson, 1894/95–1902/03
- Caleb Olliff, 1903/04–1912/13
- Angus Olliver, 2023/2–2024/25
- Matthew O'Rourke, 1991/92
- Charles Osmond, 1884/85
- Brendon Oxenham, 1993/94

== P ==
- Joseph Pabst, 1894/95–1897/98
- James Pamment, 1993/94–1995/96
- Aniket Parikh, 2016/17–2017/18
- Kenneth Parker, 1970/71
- Neal Parlane, 2011/12
- Adam Parore, 1988/89–2001/02
- Austin Parsons, 1973/74–1982/83
- Leonard Partridge, 1946/47–1950/51
- Mayu Pasupati, 2005/06–2006/07
- Dipak Patel, 1985/86–1996/97
- James Paterson, 1922/23
- Frederick Pearson, 1910/11
- Herb Pearson, 1932/33–1947/48
- Nikith Perera, 2023/24–2024/25
- David Perry, 1949/50–1958/59
- Simon Peterson, 1989/90–1996/97
- Eric Petrie, 1950/51–1954/55
- Dale Phillips, 2025/26
- Glenn Phillips, 2014/15–2021/22
- Allen Player, 1919/20–1928/29
- Bill Playle, 1956/57–1963/64
- Blair Pocock, 1990/91–2000/01
- Mark Posa, 1994/95–1995/96
- Alfred Postles, 1924/25–1938/39
- Bryce Postles, 1952/53–1956/57
- Dean Potter, 1997/98
- Albert Pratt, 1912/13
- Eddy Prentice, 1945/46
- Leopold Prime, 1907/08
- Chris Pringle, 1989/90–1997/98
- Martin Pringle, 1984/85–1992/93
- Ollie Pringle, 2020/21–2021/22
- Craig Pryor, 1997/98–2003/04
- Richard Pudney, 2000/01–2001/02
- Albert Putt, 1947/48–1950/51 (Note: Putt, who was born at Auckland in 1927, played twice for the team, once in 1947–48 against Fiji and once in 1950–51 against Central Districts. He later acted as a selector for the Auckland team. He died in 2007 at Tauranga in Bay of Plenty.)

== Q ==
- William Quentery, 1893/94
- Rob Quiney, 2010/11–2011/12
- Matt Quinn, 2012/13–2018/19

== R ==
- Geoff Rabone, 1951/52–1959/60
- Clive Radley, 1984/85
- Jeet Raval, 2008/09–2019/20
- Rodney Redmond, 1969/70–1975/76
- Arthur Rees, 1889/90
- William Rees, 1877/78
- John Reid, 1975/76–1987/88
- Richard Reid, 1985/86–1989/90
- Andrew Reinholds, 1993/94–1995/96
- Albert Relf, 1907/08–1909/10
- Ces Renwick, 1959/60
- Charles Restieaux, 1900/01 (Note: Restieaux played three matches for Auckland in 1900–01, taking five wickets with this right-arm medium paced deliveries. He was born at Christchurch in 1865 and worked as a bookmaker in Auckland. He died in the city in 1918.)
- Lindsay Rewcastle, 1979/80
- Alan Richards, 1955/56
- Isaac Richards, 1889/90–1893/94
- Mark Richardson, 1989/90–2004/05
- Jim Riley, 1972/73–1976/77
- Aubrey Ritchie, 1951/52–1959/60 (Note: A wicket-keeper, Ritchie, who was the brother of Dawson Ritchie, played 12 first-class matches for Auckland between 1951–52 and 1959–60. Born at Auckland in 1925, he died in the city in 1995.)
- Dawson Ritchie, 1943/44 (Note: The brother of Aubrey Ritchie, Dawson Ritchie played twice for Auckland during 1943–44 scoring 115 first-class runs. He was born at Auckland in 1920 and died in the city in 1994.)
- Allen Roberts, 1947/48 (Note: Roberts served in Europe during World War II and made his first-class debut for a New Zealand Services team in England in September 1945. He played one match for Auckland during the 1947–48 season. Born at Sandringham in Auckland in 1922, he died aged 92 in Richmond, British Columbia in 2015.)
- Sean Roberts, 1994/95
- Nathan Robinson, 2024/25
- William Robinson, 1902/03–1912/13
- William W Robinson, 1873/74–1884/85
- Brad Rodden, 2020/21
- Richard Rowntree, 1914/15–1931/32

== S ==
- Ned Sale, 1904/05–1914/15
- Scott Sale, 1934/35–1939/40
- Jaskaran Sandhu, 2025/26 (Note: Jaskaran Sandhu made his senior debut for the team in November 2025, having previously played age-group cricket for Auckland. He was born in the city of Auckland in 2006.)
- Raja Sandhu, 2016/17–2018/19
- R. Sands, 1905/06 (Note: Sands was born in Yorkshire in England and emigrated to Australia where he met cricketer Sammy Jones in Sydney. Jones moved to New Zealand in 1904 and coached the Grafton club and at Auckland Grammar School; in the following season he was employed as a coach by the Auckland Cricket Association. The Association employed Sands to assist Jones as their second coach for the 1905–06 season and he played for the North Shore cricket club. He made his only first-class appearance for Auckland in a January 1906 match against Hawke's Bay, taking four wickets and recording a duck in the only innings in which he batted. Little else is known about his life, with some doubt as to his first initial and sources disagreeing over his place of birth.)
- Lloyd Saunders, 1925/26
- George Schmoll, 1903/04–1905/06
- Hector Schuster, 1963/64–1964/65
- Michael Sclanders, 2022/23–2024/25
- Alfred Scott, 1925/26–1927/28
- Derek Scott, 1984/85–1988/89
- Nigel Scott, 1980/81–1987/88
- Verdun Scott, 1937/38–1952/53
- Richard Scragg, 1996/97
- Larry Sewell, 1974/75–1976/77
- Gareth Shaw, 2001/02–2010/11
- Lance Shaw, 2005/06–2009/10
- Richard Sherlock, 2009/10
- Sanjeewa Silva, 2001/02 (Note: Silva played three matches for Auckland in 2001–02. He had previously played three matches for Central Districts during the previous season and, prior to that, both first-class and List A cricket in his native Sri Lanka. He was born at Colombo in 1970 and played primarily as a medium-paced bowler.)
- Herbert Simpson, 1917/18
- John Simpson, 1925/26–1937/38
- Samrath Singh, 2024/25
- Shane Singe, 2003/04
- William Skeet, 1938/39
- Alfred Sloman, 1903/04
- Rupert Sloman, 1913/14–1918/19
- Howard Smalley, 1965/66
- Warwick Smeeton, 1913/14–1929/30
- Ian Smith, 1987/88–1991/92
- Nicholas Smith, 1971/72
- Sydney Smith, 1917/18–1925/26
- Colin Snedden, 1938/39–1947/48
- Cyril Snedden, 1920/21
- Martin Snedden, 1977/78–1989/90
- Michael Snedden, 2018/19
- Nessie Snedden, 1909/10–1927/28
- Warwick Snedden, 1946/47
- Jonathan Sole, 2013/14
- Sean Solia, 2016/17–2025/26
- Robert Somervell, 1911/12–1921/22
- Will Somerville, 2018/19–2022/23
- Bob Sorenson, 1943/44
- Brian Sorenson, 1955/56–1957/58 (Note: Born at Auckland in 1929, Brian Sorenson played 12 first-class matches for the team between 1955–56 and 1957–58, scoring 221 runs as a wicket-keeper. A left-handed batsman, Sorenson had a club foot which, according to Andrew McCarron, did not affect his wicket-keeping ability. He had played for Auckland Colts teams as early as the 19050–51 season. He died in 2009 at Auckland. His brother, Bob Sorenson, played two first-class matches for Auckland in 1943–44.)
- Lindsay Sparks, 1977/78
- John Sparling, 1956/57–1970/71
- Craig Spearman, 1993/94–1995/96
- Stewart Speed, 1962/63–1970/71
- Leicester Spring, 1936/37
- Lachie Stackpole, 2024/25
- Charles Stafford, 1884/85 (Note: Stafford played three first-class matches for Auckland in 1884–85, scoring 128 runs and taking six wickets. He took a five-wicket haul against Otago on his first-class debut and scored his only first-class half-century, an innings of 63 runs, in his final first-class match against Wellington. He had previously played for an Auckland team against the touring Australians in 1880–81. Other than a middle initial of S, no biographical details are known.)
- Keith Steele, 1974/75
- William Stemson, 1889/90–1908/09
- Michael Stephens, 1990/91–1997/98
- William Stephens, 1899/00–1900/01
- Leslie Stephen-Smith, 1931/32
- Charles Stone, 1894/95–1895/96
- Warren Stott, 1969/70–1983/84
- Scott Styris, 2005/06–2009/10
- Murphy Su'a, 1990/91–1995/96
- Quinn Sunde, 2022/23–2024/25
- Kelly Sunderland, 1990/91
- Jordan Sussex, 2021/22–2024/25
- Bert Sutcliffe, 1941/42–1948/49
- Robert Sutton, 1958/59–1973/74
- Thomas Sweet, 1873/74

== T ==
- Harry Tapping, 1950/51–1952/53
- Henry Tattersall, 1912/13–1913/14
- Archibald Taylor, 1975/76–1978/79
- Don Taylor, 1946/47–1960/61
- Frank Taylor, 1909/10–1913/14
- Ken Taylor, 1963/64
- Leslie Taylor, 1910/11–1917/18
- Ross ter Braak, 2019/20–2022/23
- James Testro, 1882/83–1886/87
- George Thompson, 1911/12
- Greg Todd, 2010/11
- Keeley Todd, 2004/05–2009/10
- Tane Topia, 2000/01
- Basil Totman, 1897/98
- Richard Tovey, 1960/61–1963/64
- Leslie Townsend, 1934/35–1935/36
- Sean Tracy, 1982/83–1984/85
- Gary Troup, 1974/75–1986/87
- Daryl Tuffey, 2007/08–2011/12
- John Turnbull, 1955/56–1962/63
- Nicholas Turner, 2009/10

== U ==
- Nat Uluiviti, 1954/55

== V ==
- Justin Vaughan, 1989/90–1996/97
- James Vince, 2018/19
- Lou Vincent, 1997/98–2012/13
- Graham Vivian, 1966/67–1978/79
- Giff Vivian, 1930/31–1938/39
- Luke Vivian, 2008/09

== W ==
- John Waddingham, 1953/54–1959/60
- Brooke Walker, 1997/98–2004/05
- Alan Wallace, 1910/11–1911/12
- Colin Wallace, 1978/79
- George Wallace, 1941/42–1945/46
- Gregory Wallace, 1976/77–1977/78
- Merv Wallace, 1933/34–1956/57
- Kerry Walmsley, 1994/95–2005/06
- Henry Walters, 1941/42
- Harold Walton, 1897/98
- Brian Warner, 1944/45
- Walter Warren, 1897/98
- John Warrington, 1975/76
- Willie Watson, 1984/85–1994/95
- Peter Webb, 1976/77–1986/87
- Frank Weir, 1927/28
- Lindsay Weir, 1927/28–1946/47
- Albert Wensley, 1929/30–1930/31
- David Weston, 1950/51
- William Wheeler, 1944/45
- Reginald Whelan, 1922/23
- Percy White, 1906/07–1907/08
- Paul Whitelaw, 1928/29–1946/47
- Sam Whiteman, 2002/03–2003/04
- Allan Wiles, 1946/47
- Arthur Williams, 1927/28 (Note: A right-handed batsman and right-arm medium paced bowler, Williams played a single match for Auckland in 1927–28, taking two wickets against Otago. He played for an Auckland veterans team in 1940–41 and was an Auckland selector, but other than a middle initial of G no biographical details are known.)
- John Williams, 1970/71–1975/76
- Norman Williams, 1893/94–1894/95
- Harold Wilson, 1923/24–1926/27
- Thomas Wilson, 1891/92
- John Wiltshire, 1974/75–1980/81
- Paul Wiseman, 1991/92–1993/94
- E. R. Woods, 1913/14 (Note: Woods played two first-class matches for Auckland, both in January 1914. Playing primarily as a bowler, he took a total of eight wickets, three on debut against Canterbury and five against Wellington in his second match. Other than a surname and initials no biographical details are known.)
- George Worker, 2021/22–2023/24
- Rupert Worker, 1914/15
- John Worrall, 1951/52–1954/55
- Ernest Wright, 1894/95–1897/98
- H. Wright, 1912/13–1913/14 (Note: Wright played three times for Auckland, once against Hawke's Bay in March 1913 and twice the following January. A batsman, he made scores of 35 and 88 on debut, but scored only 19 runs in four innings the following season. Other than a surname and initial no biographical details are known.)
- John Wright, 1989/90–1992/93
- Luke Wright, 2013/14–2014/15
- Ivan Wyatt, 1947/48
- William Wynyard, 1882/83–1899/00

== Y ==
- Robert Yates, 1873/74–1893/94
- Bryan Young, 1998/99
- Reece Young, 1998/99–2012/13

== Bibliography ==
- McCarron, Tony (2010). New Zealand Cricketers 1863/64–2010. Cardiff: The Association of Cricket Statisticians and Historians. ISBN 978-19-05138-98-2
