= Howick Pakuranga Cricket Club =

Cricket club in Auckland, New Zealand

Coordinates: 36.904757°S 174.899489°E

Howick Pakuranga Cricket Club (inc.) is a cricket club in east Auckland, New Zealand. It was formed in and is located at Lloyd Elsmore Park.

== Men's Cricket ==
=== International Honours ===
- Kyle Mills
- Colin de Grandhomme
- Brooke Walker
- Kerry Walmsley
- Dion Nash
- Blair Pocock
- Andy McKay
- Mitchell McClenaghan
- Colin Munro

=== Domestic Honours ===
- Andrew de Boorder
- Derek de Boorder
- Greg Morgan
- Gareth Hayne
- Nigel Scott

== Women's Cricket ==
=== International Honours ===
- Rebecca Rolls
