= Ted Dunning =

New Zealand cricketer

Personal information
- Full name: Edward James Dunning
- Born: 22 April 1913; Auckland, New Zealand
- Died: 14 March 1937 (aged 23); Leigh, New Zealand
- Source: Cricinfo, 5 June 2016

Edward James Dunning (22 April 1913 – 14 March 1937) was a New Zealand cricketer. He played two first-class matches for Auckland in 1936/37.

Dunning started his career in Whangateau, Rodney County. After a season where he scored more than 1,700 runs, he moved to Auckland and played for Grafton United Cricket Club. He scored a fifty in the trial match and was included in the Auckland side that travelled to Otago and Canterbury to play in the Plunket Shield during the Christmas of 1936. Dunning opened the innings in both matches, but was out without scoring each time.

When Jack Cowie was selected to New Zealand's tour of England in 1937, Dunning was among a group of friends who went to celebrate in a launch in Murrays Bay. On the way back, the dinghy carrying Dunning and four others (including Mal Matheson and Frederick Byerley) capsized. The others were saved but Dunning could not be found. His body washed up on the beach next morning.

== See also ==
- List of Auckland representative cricketers
