= Lythe (disambiguation) =

Lythe is a village and civil parish in North Yorkshire, England.

Lythe may also refer to:

- Lythe, an alternative name for a type of fish, also known as pollock

== People with the surname ==
- Ben Lythe, former professional rugby league footballer
- Tim Lythe (born 1980), New Zealand cricketer
