= Colin Wallace (disambiguation) =

Colin Wallace is a psychological warfare specialist.

Colin Wallace may also refer to:

- Colin Wallace (cricketer)
- Colin Wallace, character in The Last Train (TV series)
