= Robert Frater =

Robert Frater may refer to:

- Robert Frater (cricketer) (1902–1968), New Zealand cricketer
- Robert Frater (fencer) (1885–1965), British Olympic fencer
