= William Brook-Smith =

New Zealand cricketer

- Brook-Smith in the 1907–08 season

Personal information
- Full name: William Brook Smith
- Born: 1 May 1885; Auckland, New Zealand
- Died: 2 August 1952 (aged 67); Auckland, New Zealand
- Nickname: Brooky
- Batting: Right-handed
- Bowling: Right-arm

Domestic team information
- Years: Team
- 1904/05–1922/23: Auckland

Career statistics
| Competition | First-class |
|---|---|
| Matches | 30 |
| Runs scored | 1,279 |
| Batting average | 27.21 |
| 100s/50s | 2/4 |
| Top score | 112* |
| Balls bowled | 1,008 |
| Wickets | 24 |
| Bowling average | 26.00 |
| 5 wickets in innings | 0 |
| 10 wickets in match | 0 |
| Best bowling | 4/63 |
| Catches/stumpings | 16/– |
- Source: ESPNcricinfo, 1 January 2020

William Brook-Smith or William Brook Smith (1 May 1885 – 2 August 1952) was a New Zealand cricketer. He played 29 first-class matches for Auckland between 1905 and 1923.

== Family and early life ==
Smith was born in Auckland and named William Brook Smith, son of James Henry Smith, an immigrant from Yorkshire, and Mary Smith, from Ireland. Although he was generally known in cricket circles by the surname "Brook-Smith", he appears to have never changed his surname from "Smith". He was educated at Prince Albert College in Auckland.

== Career ==
In his first first-class match, aged 19, Brook-Smith scored 112 not out, reaching his century in 105 minutes, against Hawke's Bay in March 1905. He and James Hussey added 115 for the ninth wicket. Auckland won by an innings, and nobody else in the match reached 50. In December 1905 The New Zealand Herald described him as a "stylish and dashing young batsman, particularly good in late cutting, and free scorer all round [the] wicket".

In 1907-08 he played in the first Plunket Shield match, opening the batting with Lancelot Hemus and making 53 of their partnership of 100. Later that season he scored 110, the only century of the match, when Auckland beat Otago. In 1910-11 he was the highest scorer in a low-scoring match against Wellington, making 33 and 72 not out in a narrow victory that enabled Auckland to retain the Plunket Shield.

He played once for New Zealand, in their last match before World War I, scoring 46 and 18 against Australia in March 1914. He played senior club cricket in Auckland for 30 years before retiring in 1932.

From 1906 to 1910 he represented Auckland at hockey.

== Personal life ==
Smith joined the Auckland Harbour Board in 1902 as a cadet in the secretary and treasurer's department. He was appointed assistant secretary of the Board in 1924 and acting secretary in 1935. He was appointed secretary of the Board in December 1936.

Smith and his wife Louisa had a son, Evan Brook Smith, and a daughter, Margery Brook Smith.
