= Vishwajeet Kumar =

Vishwajeet Kumar may refer to:

- Vishwajeet Kumar (politician) (fl. 2013–2018), Indian politician
- Vishi Jeet (Vishwajeet Kumar, born 1993), Indian-born New Zealand cricketer
