= Percy White =

Percy White may refer to:

- Percy White (cricketer) (1868–1946), New Zealand cricketer
- Percy White (rugby league) (1887–1918), Australian rugby league player
- Percy White (nuclear scientist) (1916–2013), British nuclear scientist
- Percy Hynes White (born 2001), Canadian actor
