= Richard Matthews =

Richard Matthews may refer to:

- Richard Matthews (soldier), general with the East India Company
- Richard Matthews (microbiologist) (1921–1995), New Zealand plant virologist
- Richard Matthews (cricketer) (born 1950), New Zealand cricketer
- Richard Matthews (filmmaker) (1952–2013), South African wildlife filmmaker
- Richard Matthews (Maryland), candidate for congress in Maryland

== See also ==
- Dick Matthews, American baseball player
