= Donald Hill (disambiguation) =

Donald Hill (1922–1994) was an English engineer and historian of science and technology.

Donald or Don Hill may also refer to:

- Don Hill (American football) (1904–1967), American football player
- Donald Hill (cricketer) (born 1940), New Zealand cricketer
- Don Hill (politician) (born 1946), member of the Kansas House of Representatives
- Donnie Hill (born 1960), baseball player
- The Donalds, hills in the Scottish Lowlands
- Donald's Hill, a hill in the middle of County Londonderry, Northern Ireland
