= Guy Coleman =

New Zealand cricketer (born 1974)

Personal information
- Born: 26 June 1974 (age 52); Auckland, New Zealand
- Source: ESPNcricinfo, 5 June 2016

Guy Coleman (born 26 June 1974) is a New Zealand former cricketer and coach. He played three List A matches for Auckland in 2001/02. Coleman also played for Grafton United Cricket Club, scoring more than 4,600 runs and taking more than 400 wickets for the team, in a career spanning twenty years.

== See also ==
- List of Auckland representative cricketers
