= Eddy Prentice =

New Zealand cricketer

Personal information
- Full name: Eddy Shannon Prentice
- Born: 24 September 1920; Reefton, New Zealand
- Died: 20 September 2009 (aged 88); Auckland, New Zealand
- Source: ESPNcricinfo, 19 June 2016

Eddy Prentice (24 September 1920 – 20 September 2009) was a New Zealand cricketer. He played one first-class match for Auckland in 1945/46.

== See also ==
- List of Auckland representative cricketers
