= Michael Stephens (cricketer) =

New Zealand cricketer (born 1967)

Michael James Stephens (born 1 November 1967 in Auckland) is a former New Zealand cricketer who played for the Auckland Aces and the Northern Districts Knights in the 1990s and he also played for Counties-Manukau in the Hawke Cup. Nowdadys he works for St Joseph's School in Pukekohe.

== See also ==
- List of Auckland representative cricketers
