= William Skeet =

New Zealand cricketer

Personal information
- Full name: William Reginald Skeet
- Born: 28 July 1906; Auckland, New Zealand
- Died: 9 July 1989 (aged 82); Auckland, New Zealand
- Source: ESPNcricinfo, 21 June 2016

William Skeet (28 July 1906 – 9 July 1989) was a New Zealand cricketer. He played one first-class match for Auckland in 1938/39.

== See also ==
- List of Auckland representative cricketers
