= Pieter Erasmus =

South African-born New Zealand cricketer (born 1983)

Personal information
- Born: 19 March 1983 (age 43); Ceres, Western Cape, South Africa
- Source: Cricinfo, 7 June 2016

Pieter Erasmus (born 19 March 1983) is a New Zealand former cricketer who was born in South Africa. He played four first-class matches for Auckland between 2006 and 2010.

== See also ==
- List of Auckland representative cricketers
