= Wayne Enoka =

New Zealand cricketer (born 1970)

Personal information
- Born: 30 January 1970 (age 56); Auckland, New Zealand
- Source: ESPNcricinfo, 7 June 2016

Wayne Enoka (born 30 January 1970) is a New Zealand former cricketer and coach. He played three first-class matches for Auckland in 1997/98. After his cricket career, Enoka has appeared on stage in productions of Avenue Q.

== See also ==
- List of Auckland representative cricketers
