= Jonathan Sole =

New Zealand cricketer (born 1987)

Personal information
- Full name: Jonathan David Sole
- Born: 9 February 1987 (age 39); Wellington, New Zealand
- Source: ESPNcricinfo, 21 June 2016

Jonathan Sole (born 9 February 1987) is a New Zealand former cricketer. He played five List A matches for Auckland in 2014.

== See also ==
- List of Auckland representative cricketers
