= James Paterson (cricketer) =

New Zealand cricketer

Personal information
- Full name: James Logan Paterson
- Born: 25 January 1889; Southbridge, Canterbury, New Zealand
- Died: 21 August 1966 (aged 77); Te Awanga, New Zealand
- Bowling: Right-arm medium-pace

Career statistics
| Competition | First-class |
|---|---|
| Matches | 13 |
| Runs scored | 364 |
| Batting average | 15.82 |
| 100s/50s | 0/2 |
| Top score | 71 |
| Balls bowled | 846 |
| Wickets | 21 |
| Bowling average | 20.71 |
| 5 wickets in innings | 0 |
| 10 wickets in match | 0 |
| Best bowling | 4/60 |
| Catches/stumpings | 6/– |
- Source: ESPNcricinfo, 8 April 2022

James Paterson (25 January 1889 – 21 August 1966) was a New Zealand cricketer. He played first-class cricket for Auckland, Canterbury and Hawke's Bay between 1912 and 1923.

Paterson married Eva Paddy in the Christchurch suburb of Sydenham in November 1913.

== See also ==
- List of Auckland representative cricketers
