= Warren Linn =

New Zealand cricketer (born 1954)

Personal information
- Full name: Warren Stuart Linn
- Born: 10 September 1954 (age 72); Hāwera, New Zealand
- Source: ESPNcricinfo, 15 June 2016

Warren Linn (born 10 September 1954) is a New Zealand former cricketer. He played first-class and List A cricket for Auckland and List A cricket for Central Districts.

== See also ==
- List of Auckland representative cricketers
