= John Howlett (cricketer) =

Australian cricketer

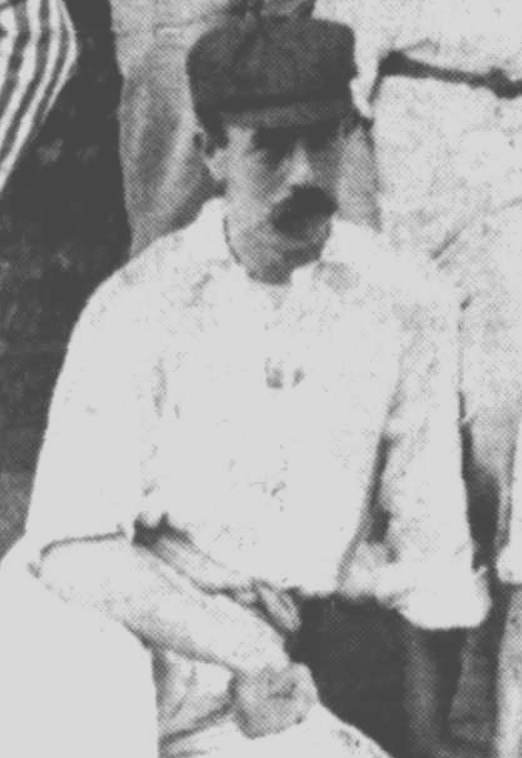

Personal information
- Born: 8 April 1868; Melbourne, Australia
- Died: 15 June 1931 (aged 63); Melbourne, Australia

Domestic team information
- Years: Team
- 1891/92: Auckland
- 1903/04: Victoria
- Source: Cricinfo, 15 November 2015

John Howlett (8 April 1868 – 15 June 1931) was an Australian cricketer. He played first-class cricket for Auckland and Victoria.

== See also ==
- List of Victoria first-class cricketers
- List of Auckland representative cricketers
