= William Hendy =

New Zealand cricketer

Personal information
- Full name: William James Hendy
- Born: 2 April 1900; Auckland, New Zealand
- Died: 23 September 1992 (aged 92); Auckland, New Zealand
- Source: ESPNcricinfo, 12 June 2016

William Hendy (2 April 1900 – 23 September 1992) was a New Zealand cricketer. He played two first-class matches for Auckland in 1927/28.

== See also ==
- List of Auckland representative cricketers
