= Walter Harvie =

New Zealand cricketer

Personal information
- Born: 18 June 1891; Auckland, New Zealand
- Died: 24 May 1969 (aged 77); Auckland, New Zealand
- Source: ESPNcricinfo, 11 June 2016

Walter Harvie (18 June 1891 – 24 May 1969) was a New Zealand cricketer. He played two first-class matches for Auckland in 1914/15.

He captained a New Zealand team, consisting mostly of players from Auckland, on a tour of Fiji in March and April 1924. The team played five matches, including two three-day matches against Fiji. None of the matches were first-class.

== See also ==
- List of Auckland representative cricketers
