= James Pamment =

New Zealand cricketer (born 1968)

Personal information
- Born: 24 September 1968 (age 58); Emley, Huddersfield, England
- Role: Mumbai Indians fielding coach
- Source: Cricinfo, 19 June 2016

James Ian Pamment (24 September 1968) is former cricketer who played 14 first-class matches for Auckland between 1993 and 1996 in the Shell Trophy. He played in 32 List A Shell Cup one-day matches and in a one-day match against the West Indies.

A right-handed batsman he scored 351 first class runs at an average of 15.95 with a best of 98 against Central Districts. This was his only first class fifty. He was more successful in the one day arena, scoring 933 runs at 30.09 with a top score of 105* against Wellington. He did not take a wicket in either form of the game with his occasional right arm medium pace.

He won two man of the match awards in the Shell Cup, for his century against Wellington in 1993 and in the match against Central Districts in 1994 in which he scored an unbeaten 51 out of 124 to steer his team home.

He played for Yorkshire Cricket Association Under-19s in 1987 and appeared for Sir R Brierley's XI against Pakistan in the 1993/94 season.

He was born on 24 September 1968 in Emley, Huddersfield, Yorkshire in England, where he played his early cricket.

He was appointed as fielding coach for the Mumbai Indians. In July 2019, he was appointed as the fielding coach of the United States national cricket team on a short-term basis.

== See also ==
- List of Auckland representative cricketers
