= Ces Renwick =

New Zealand cricketer (1924–2014)

Personal information
- Full name: Cecil Renwick
- Born: 26 July 1924; Auckland, New Zealand
- Died: 18 June 2014 (aged 89); Auckland, New Zealand
- Source: ESPNcricinfo, 20 June 2016

Cecil Renwick (26 July 1924 – 18 June 2014) was a New Zealand cricketer. He played two first-class matches for Auckland in 1959/60. He was awarded the Bert Sutcliffe Medal in 2011.

== See also ==
- List of Auckland representative cricketers
