= Rupert Sloman =

New Zealand cricketer

Personal information
- Full name: Rupert Geoffrey Sloman
- Born: 23 June 1890; Auckland, New Zealand
- Died: 2 August 1951 (aged 61); Auckland, New Zealand
- Source: ESPNcricinfo, 21 June 2016

Rupert Sloman (23 June 1890 – 2 August 1951) was a New Zealand cricketer. He played four first-class matches for Auckland between 1913 and 1919.

== See also ==
- List of Auckland representative cricketers
