= Richard Drown =

New Zealand cricketer (born 1966)

Personal information
- Born: 2 May 1966 (age 60); Hastings, New Zealand
- Source: ESPNcricinfo, 5 June 2016

Richard Drown (born 2 May 1966) is a New Zealand former cricketer. He played nine first-class and two List A matches for Auckland between 1991 and 1993.

== See also ==
- List of Auckland representative cricketers
