= Thomas Hambrook =

New Zealand cricketer

Personal information
- Born: 6 June 1922; London, New Zealand
- Died: 2 September 1987 (aged 65); Auckland, New Zealand
- Source: ESPNcricinfo, 11 June 2016

Thomas Hambrook (6 June 1922 – 2 September 1987) was a New Zealand cricketer. He played 33 first-class matches for Auckland between 1951 and 1959.

== See also ==
- List of Auckland representative cricketers
