= Norman Williams (New Zealand cricketer) =

New Zealand cricketer

Personal information
- Full name: Norman Theodore Williams
- Born: 20 July 1864; Waimate North, New Zealand
- Died: 4 April 1928 (aged 63); Auckland, New Zealand
- Source: ESPNcricinfo, 26 June 2016

Norman Williams (20 July 1864 – 4 April 1928) was a New Zealand cricketer. He played three first-class matches for Auckland between 1893 and 1895.

== See also ==
- List of Auckland representative cricketers
