= John Waddingham =

New Zealand cricketer

Personal information
- Full name: John Seaton Waddingham
- Born: 24 August 1934 (age 92); Auckland, New Zealand
- Source: ESPNcricinfo, 25 June 2016

John Seaton Waddingham (born 24 August 1934) is a New Zealand former cricketer. He played five first-class matches for Auckland between 1953 and 1960.

== See also ==
- List of Auckland representative cricketers
