= John Warrington (cricketer) =

New Zealand cricketer (1948–2022)

Personal information
- Full name: John William Warrington
- Born: 2 November 1948; Coventry, England
- Died: 4 November 2022 (aged 74); Auckland, New Zealand
- Batting: Left-handed
- Source: ESPNcricinfo, 26 June 2016

John William Warrington (2 November 1948 – 4 November 2022) was a New Zealand cricketer. He played first-class cricket for Auckland and Northern Districts between 1973 and 1976.

Warrington also played football for Birmingham City, Worcester City and Banbury United.

== See also ==
- List of Auckland representative cricketers
