= John Simpson (New Zealand cricketer) =

New Zealand cricketer

Personal information
- Full name: John Brodie Simpson
- Born: 11 January 1907; Auckland, New Zealand
- Died: 16 June 1980 (aged 73); Auckland, New Zealand
- Source: ESPNcricinfo, 21 June 2016

John Simpson (11 January 1907 – 16 June 1980) was a New Zealand cricketer. He played four first-class matches for Auckland between 1925 and 1938.

== See also ==
- List of Auckland representative cricketers
