= Harry Tapping =

New Zealand cricketer

Personal information
- Full name: Harry Edward Tapping
- Born: 27 March 1926; Gisborne, New Zealand
- Died: 9 February 2008 (aged 81); Gisborne, New Zealand
- Source: ESPNcricinfo, 25 June 2016

Harry Edward Tapping (27 March 1926 – 9 February 2008) was a New Zealand cricketer. He played eight first-class matches for Auckland between 1950 and 1953.

== See also ==
- List of Auckland representative cricketers
