= Ray Farman =

New Zealand cricketer

Personal information
- Born: 2 March 1927; Auckland, New Zealand
- Died: 1 July 1996 (aged 69); Rarotonga, Cook Islands
- Source: ESPNcricinfo, 8 June 2016

Ray Farman (2 March 1927 – 1 July 1996) was a New Zealand cricketer. He played eleven first-class matches for Auckland between 1957 and 1960.

== See also ==
- List of Auckland representative cricketers
