= Leonard Partridge =

New Zealand cricketer

Personal information
- Full name: Leonard Ernest Partridge
- Born: 22 June 1922; Auckland, New Zealand
- Died: 24 November 1977 (aged 55); Auckland, New Zealand
- Source: ESPNcricinfo, 19 June 2016

Leonard Partridge (22 June 1922 – 24 November 1977) was a New Zealand cricketer. He played seven first-class matches for Auckland between 1942 and 1951.

== See also ==
- List of Auckland representative cricketers
