= Francis Hemmingson =

New Zealand cricketer

Personal information
- Full name: Francis Edward Hemmingson
- Born: 5 September 1912; Auckland, New Zealand
- Died: 7 April 1963 (aged 50); Auckland, New Zealand
- Source: ESPNcricinfo, 12 June 2016

Francis Hemmingson (5 September 1912 – 7 April 1963) was a New Zealand cricketer. He played eleven first-class matches for Auckland between 1945 and 1950.

== See also ==
- List of Auckland representative cricketers
