= Paul Kelly (cricketer) =

New Zealand cricketer (born 1960)

Personal information
- Full name: Paul James Kelly
- Born: 15 February 1960 (age 66); Palmerston North, New Zealand
- Source: ESPNcricinfo, 13 June 2016

Paul Kelly (born 15 February 1960) is a New Zealand former cricketer. He played 49 first-class and 36 List A matches for Auckland between 1980 and 1990.

== See also ==
- List of Auckland representative cricketers
