= Sean Roberts (cricketer) =

New Zealand cricketer (1968–2017)

Personal information
- Full name: Sean Alexander Roberts
- Born: 21 December 1968; Napier, New Zealand
- Died: 27 March 2017 (aged 48)
- Batting: Right-handed
- Source: ESPNcricinfo, 20 June 2016

Sean Alexander Roberts (21 December 1968 – 27 March 2017) was a New Zealand cricketer. He played one first-class match for Auckland in 1994/95.

== See also ==
- List of Auckland representative cricketers
