= William Quentery =

New Zealand cricketer

Personal information
- Full name: William George Lloyd Quentery
- Born: 1861; Peckham, England
- Died: 9 June 1940 (aged 78–79); Auckland, New Zealand
- Source: ESPNcricinfo, 19 June 2016

William Quentery (1861 – 9 June 1940) was a New Zealand cricketer. He played one first-class match for Auckland 1893/94.

== See also ==
- List of Auckland representative cricketers
