= Frank McNeill =

New Zealand cricketer (1877–1930)

Personal information
- Full name: Frank Anderson McNeill
- Born: 1 October 1877; Dunedin, New Zealand
- Died: 21 October 1930 (aged 53); Wellington, New Zealand
- Source: ESPNcricinfo, 17 June 2016

Frank Anderson McNeill (1 October 1877 – 21 October 1930) was a New Zealand cricketer. He played two first-class matches for Auckland in 1905/06.

== See also ==
- List of Auckland representative cricketers
