= Leo Prime =

New Zealand cricketer

Personal information
- Full name: Frederick Leopold Prime
- Born: 19 November 1884; Auckland, New Zealand
- Died: 21 May 1923 (aged 38); Auckland, New Zealand
- Source: ESPNcricinfo, 19 June 2016

Frederick Leopold Prime (19 November 1884 – 21 May 1923) was a New Zealand cricketer. He played two first-class matches for Auckland in 1907/08.

In Auckland cricket Leo Prime was regarded as "a brilliant field and a solid and forceful batsman", as well as a useful bowler and wicket-keeper. On his first-class debut he was a member of the Auckland team that won the first-ever challenge match for the Plunket Shield when they beat Canterbury in December 1907.

Prime married Doris Gittos in Auckland in November 1912. He ran a furniture shop in Karangahape Road, Auckland. He was a talented cellist who often appeared in amateur performances in Auckland.

Prime died at his home in the Auckland suburb of Devonport in May 1923 after a short illness, aged 38.

== See also ==
- List of Auckland representative cricketers
