= Steve Brown (cricketer) =

New Zealand cricketer (born 1963)

Personal information
- Full name: Stephen William Brown
- Born: 12 October 1963 (age 63); Hastings, New Zealand
- Source: Cricinfo, 4 June 2016

Stephen William Brown (born 12 October 1963) is a New Zealand former cricketer. He played 53 first-class and 35 List A matches for Auckland between 1987 and 1995.

== See also ==
- List of Auckland representative cricketers
