= Richard Pudney =

New Zealand cricketer (born 1978)

Personal information
- Full name: Richard Alan Pudney
- Born: 6 June 1978 (age 48); Auckland, New Zealand
- Source: ESPNcricinfo, 19 June 2016

Richard Pudney (born 6 June 1978) is a New Zealand former cricketer. He played two first-class and one List A matches for Auckland between 2000 and 2002.

== See also ==
- List of Auckland representative cricketers
