= Shane Singe =

New Zealand cricketer (born 1980)

Personal information
- Full name: Shane Patrick Laurence Singe
- Born: 13 March 1980 (age 46); Auckland, New Zealand
- Source: ESPNcricinfo, 21 June 2016

Shane Singe (born 13 March 1980) is a New Zealand former cricketer. He played two first-class matches for Auckland in 2003/04.

== See also ==
- List of Auckland representative cricketers
