= William Stemson =

New Zealand cricketer

Personal information
- Full name: William Isaac Stemson
- Born: 30 June 1867; Christchurch, New Zealand
- Died: 13 June 1951 (aged 83); Torbay, Western Australia
- Source: ESPNcricinfo, 22 June 2016

William Stemson (30 June 1867 – 13 June 1951) was a New Zealand cricketer. He played 31 first-class matches for Auckland between 1889 and 1909.

== See also ==
- List of Auckland representative cricketers
