= James Forrest (New Zealand cricketer) =

New Zealand cricketer (born 1974)

Personal information
- Born: 16 June 1974 (age 52); Auckland, New Zealand
- Source: ESPNcricinfo, 8 June 2016

James Forrest (born 16 June 1974) is a New Zealand former cricketer. He played nine first-class and five List A matches for Auckland between 1996 and 1998.

== See also ==
- List of Auckland representative cricketers
