= Jonathan Mumford =

New Zealand cricketer

Personal information
- Full name: Jonathan Butler Mumford
- Born: 1842; Ealing, England
- Died: 14 December 1892 (aged 49–50); Auckland, New Zealand
- Source: ESPNcricinfo, 19 June 2016

Jonathan Mumford (1842 – 14 December 1892) was a New Zealand cricketer. He played four first-class matches for Auckland between 1873 and 1878.

Mumford captained the Auckland United senior club team for about 20 years. He was the manager and groundsman of the cricket grounds in the Auckland Domain for many years, having been among the group of men who were instrumental in the formation of the grounds. He died suddenly while playing cricket.

== See also ==
- List of Auckland representative cricketers
