= Ronald Hemi =

New Zealand rugby union footballer

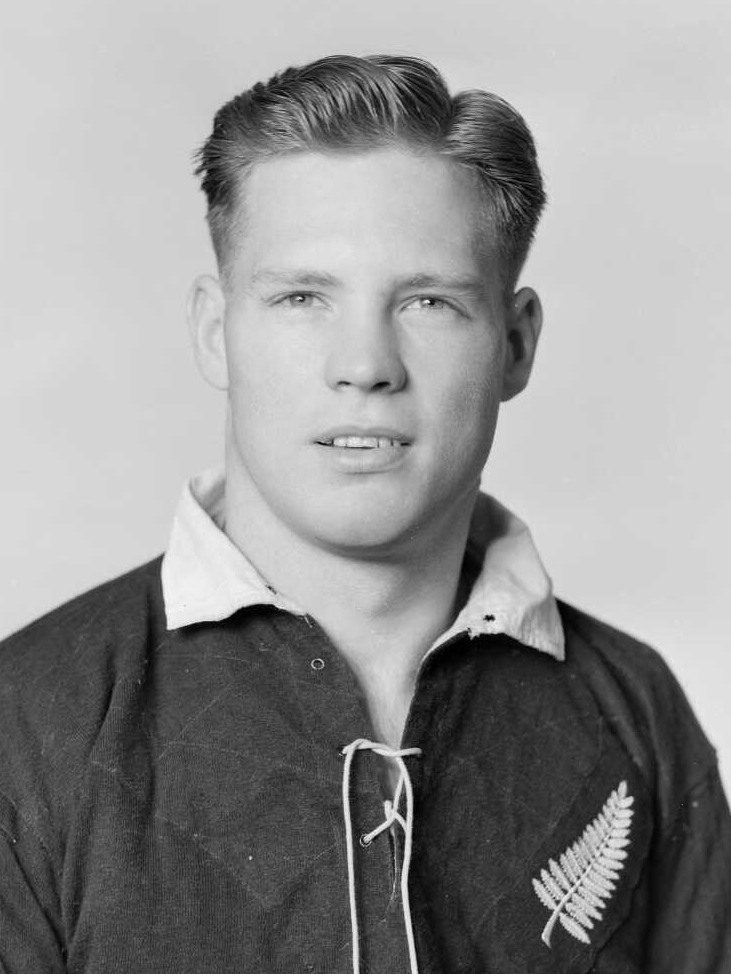
- Hemi in 1953
- Born: 15 May 1933 Whangārei, New Zealand
- Died: 13 September 2000 (aged 67) Hamilton, New Zealand
- Height: 1.83 m (6 ft 0 in)
- Weight: 86 kg (190 lb)

Rugby union career
- Position: Hooker
International career
Years	Team	Apps	(Points)
1953–1959	New Zealand	46	(18)

Ronald Courtney Hemi (15 May 1933 – 13 September 2000) was a New Zealand rugby union footballer. He played 46 matches for the All Blacks including 16 tests from 1953 to 1959. He also played first-class cricket for Auckland.

== See also ==
- List of Auckland representative cricketers
