= John Kasper (cricketer) =

New Zealand cricketer (1946–2020)

Personal information
- Full name: Ronald John Kasper
- Born: 22 March 1946; Auckland, New Zealand
- Died: 22 January 2020 (aged 73); Auckland, New Zealand
- Source: ESPNcricinfo, 13 June 2016

Ronald John Kasper (22 March 1946 – 22 January 2020) was a New Zealand cricketer. He played first-class cricket for Auckland and Natal between 1966 and 1979. He later worked as a cricket coach in Auckland.

== See also ==
- List of Auckland representative cricketers
