= Lloyd Saunders =

New Zealand cricketer

Personal information
- Full name: Lloyd Havelock Saunders
- Born: 23 September 1897; Waihi, New Zealand
- Died: 8 March 1984 (aged 86); Auckland, New Zealand
- Source: ESPNcricinfo, 20 June 2016

Lloyd Saunders (23 September 1897 – 8 March 1984) was a New Zealand cricketer. He played one first-class match for Auckland in 1925/26.

== See also ==
- List of Auckland representative cricketers
