= William Wheeler (cricketer) =

New Zealand cricketer

Personal information
- Full name: William J Wheeler
- Source: ESPNcricinfo, 26 June 2016

William Wheeler was a New Zealand cricketer. He played two first-class matches for Auckland in 1944/45.

== See also ==
- List of Auckland representative cricketers
