= Harold Wilson (cricketer) =

New Zealand cricketer

Personal information
- Full name: Harold Wilson
- Source: ESPNcricinfo, 26 June 2016

Harold Wilson was a New Zealand cricketer. He played seven first-class matches for Auckland between 1923 and 1927.

== See also ==
- List of Auckland representative cricketers
