= Patrick Hounsell =

New Zealand cricketer (born 1958)

Personal information
- Full name: Patrick James Hounsell
- Born: 7 June 1958 (age 68); Blenheim, New Zealand
- Source: ESPNcricinfo, 12 June 2016

Patrick Hounsell (born 7 June 1958) is a former New Zealand cricketer. He played four first-class matches for Auckland between 1987 and 1989.

== See also ==
- List of Auckland representative cricketers
