= Richard Scragg =

New Zealand cricketer (born 1978)

Personal information
- Full name: Richard Steven Scragg
- Born: 5 April 1978 (age 48); Auckland, New Zealand
- Source: ESPNcricinfo, 21 June 2016

Richard Scragg (born 5 April 1978) is a New Zealand former cricketer. He played first-class cricket for Auckland and Central Districts between 1996 and 2002.

== See also ==
- List of Auckland representative cricketers
