= Simon Peterson =

New Zealand cricketer (born 1968)

Personal information
- Full name: Simon James Peterson
- Born: 17 November 1968 (age 57); Auckland, New Zealand
- Source: Cricinfo, 19 June 2016

Simon James Peterson (born 17 November 1968) is a New Zealand former cricketer. He played 26 first-class and 19 List A matches for Auckland from 1989 to 1997.

== See also ==
- List of Auckland representative cricketers
