= Frank Taylor (Auckland cricketer) =

New Zealand cricketer

Personal information
- Full name: Frank Alwyn Taylor
- Born: 1 March 1890; Auckland, New Zealand
- Died: 25 June 1960 (aged 70); Elsfield, Oxfordshire, England
- Source: Cricinfo, 25 June 2016

Frank Taylor (1 March 1890 – 25 June 1960) was a New Zealand cricketer. He played seven first-class matches for Auckland between 1909 and 1914.

== See also ==
- List of Auckland representative cricketers
