= Richard Irving (cricketer) =

New Zealand cricketer (born 1969)

Personal information
- Full name: Richard John Robert Irving
- Born: 19 September 1969 (age 57); Christchurch, New Zealand
- Source: ESPNcricinfo, 12 June 2016

Richard Irving (born 19 September 1969) is a New Zealand former cricketer. He played three first-class matches for Auckland between 1996 and 2001.

== See also ==
- List of Auckland representative cricketers
