= Newell Lusk =

New Zealand cricketer

- Auckland in January 1904, Lusk in middle row at left

Personal information
- Full name: William Newell Butler Lusk
- Born: 15 January 1875; Auckland, New Zealand
- Died: 23 July 1956 (aged 81); Te Kuiti, New Zealand
- Source: ESPNcricinfo, 15 June 2016

Newell Lusk (15 January 1875 – 23 July 1956) was a New Zealand cricketer. He played eight first-class matches for Auckland between 1899 and 1904.

== See also ==
- List of Auckland representative cricketers
