= Leslie Stephen-Smith =

English-born New Zealand cricketer

Leslie Stephen-Smith (13 October 1904 — 22 May 1988) was an English-born New Zealand cricketer. He was a wicket-keeper who played for Auckland. He was born in Marlow and died in Auckland.

Stephen-Smith made two first-class appearances for the team during the 1931–32 season. He made two scores of 9 runs on his debut first-class appearance, against Otago, and scored 10 runs in two innings in his second and final first-class appearance, just a week later, against Canterbury.

== See also ==
- List of Auckland representative cricketers
