= Hector Schuster =

New Zealand cricketer (1942–2007)

Personal information
- Full name: Hector Thomas Schuster
- Born: 15 January 1942; Fiji
- Died: 26 November 2007 (aged 65); Brisbane, Australia
- Source: ESPNcricinfo, 20 June 2016

Hector Schuster (15 January 1942 – 26 November 2007) was a New Zealand cricketer. He played first-class cricket for Auckland and Northern Districts between 1963 and 1972.

== See also ==
- List of Auckland representative cricketers
