= Larry Sewell =

New Zealand cricketer (born 1948)

Personal information
- Full name: Larry John Sewell
- Born: 16 August 1948 (age 78); Auckland, New Zealand
- Source: ESPNcricinfo, 21 June 2016

Larry Sewell (born 16 August 1948) is a New Zealand former cricketer. He played three List A matches for Auckland between 1974 and 1977.

== See also ==
- List of Auckland representative cricketers
