= Mayu Pasupati =

New Zealand cricketer (born 1976)

Personal information
- Full name: Mayuran Yoga Pasupati
- Born: 5 December 1976 (age 49); Jaffna, Sri Lanka
- Batting: Right-handed
- Bowling: Right-arm fast-medium
- Role: Bowler

Domestic team information
- Years: Team
- Auckland
- Wellington

Career statistics
Competition	FC	LA	T20
Matches	4	70	11
Runs scored	88	681	86
Batting average	29.33	16.60	21.50
100s/50s	0/1	0/0	0/0
Top score	76*	42	28
Balls bowled	375	2650	176
Wickets	8	69	9
Bowling average	20.75	31.60	25.55
5 wickets in innings	0	0	0
10 wickets in match	0	0	0
Best bowling	4/39	4/33	2/16
Catches/stumpings	1/0	12/0	6/0
- Source: (Cricinfo), 26 April 2008

Mayu Pasupati (born 5 December 1976) is a cricketer originally from Sri Lanka but who played cricket in New Zealand. A fast-medium bowler, he has played for Wellington and Auckland. He made his first-class debut for Auckland in 1997/98 against Otago. His List-A debut for Auckland came in 1998/99 also against Otago. His Twenty20 debut for Auckland came on 20 January 2006 against Northern Districts. He has also played for Wellington City in the Hawke Cup. He was well known for his acrobatic catches and big-hitting style.

In the 2002 State Shield one-day final, which Wellington won, Pasupati caught Aaron Redmond out off the bowling of Mark Jefferson. His one-handed take in the outfield was memorable enough to be reported, 15 years later, as "one of the best catches seen on New Zealand soil".

== See also ==
- List of Auckland representative cricketers
