= Ian Fisher (New Zealand cricketer) =

New Zealand cricketer (born 1961)

Personal information
- Born: 1 March 1961 (age 65); Auckland, New Zealand
- Source: ESPNcricinfo, 8 June 2016

Ian Fisher (born 1 March 1961) is a New Zealand former cricketer. He played 21 first-class and 19 List A matches for Auckland and Central Districts between 1982 and 1993.

== See also ==
- List of Auckland representative cricketers
