= Thomas Neill (cricketer) =

New Zealand cricketer

Personal information
- Born: 18 September 1867; Greenock, Scotland
- Died: 1949 (aged 81–82); Auckland, New Zealand
- Source: ESPNcricinfo, 19 June 2016

Thomas Neill (18 September 1867 – 1949) was a New Zealand cricketer. He played two first-class matches for Auckland between 1892 and 1898.

== See also ==
- List of Auckland representative cricketers
