= Dusan Hakaraia =

New Zealand cricketer (born 1983)

Personal information
- Born: 30 May 1983 (age 43); Kahuku, Hawaii, United States
- Source: Cricinfo, 11 June 2016

Dusan Hakaraia (born 30 May 1983) is a New Zealand former cricketer and coach. He played five first-class, six List A, and five Twenty20 matches for Auckland from 2010 to 2013. Hakaraia is from Croatian descent, and has also represented a New Zealand Croatia team.

== See also ==
- List of Auckland representative cricketers
