= Harold Nottman =

New Zealand cricketer

Personal information
- Full name: Harold Cooper Nottman
- Born: 18 February 1917; Rochdale, England
- Died: 2 August 2008 (aged 91); Hampstead, England
- Source: ESPNcricinfo, 19 June 2016

Harold Nottman (18 February 1917 – 2 August 2008) was a New Zealand cricketer. He played one first-class match for Auckland in 1941/42.

== See also ==
- List of Auckland representative cricketers
