= Kelly Sunderland =

New Zealand cricketer (born 1970)

Personal information
- Full name: Kelly John Sunderland
- Born: 17 July 1970 (age 56); Auckland, New Zealand
- Source: ESPNcricinfo, 22 June 2016

Kelly Sunderland (born 17 July 1970) is a New Zealand former cricketer. He played four first-class matches for Auckland in 1990/91.

== See also ==
- List of Auckland representative cricketers
