= Tom Hellaby =

New Zealand cricketer

Personal information
- Full name: Alan Thomas Ranken Hellaby
- Born: 11 November 1958; Auckland, New Zealand
- Died: 20 July 2009 (aged 50)
- Source: ESPNcricinfo, 12 June 2016

Alan Thomas Ranken Hellaby (11 November 1958 – 20 July 2009) was a New Zealand cricketer. He played 26 first-class and 24 List A matches for Auckland between 1979 and 1988.

Hellaby died on 20 July 2009.

== See also ==
- List of Auckland representative cricketers
