= Dean Bartlett =

New Zealand cricketer (born 1987)

Personal information
- Born: 10 October 1987 (age 39); Auckland, New Zealand
- Source: ESPNcricinfo, 2 June 2016

Dean Bartlett (born 10 October 1987) is a New Zealand cricketer. He plays first-class cricket for Auckland.

== See also ==
- List of Auckland representative cricketers
