= Mark Posa =

New Zealand cricketer (born 1966)

Personal information
- Full name: Mark Walter Posa
- Born: 22 June 1966 (age 60); Auckland, New Zealand
- Source: ESPNcricinfo, 19 June 2016

Mark Posa (born 22 June 1966) is a New Zealand former cricketer. He played three first-class and eight List A matches for Auckland between 1994 and 1996.

== See also ==
- List of Auckland representative cricketers
