= John Turnbull (cricketer) =

New Zealand cricketer

Personal information
- Full name: John Ashley Turnbull
- Born: 30 June 1935; Gisborne, New Zealand
- Died: 13 February 2018 (aged 82); Katikati, New Zealand
- Source: ESPNcricinfo, 25 June 2016

John Ashley Turnbull (30 June 1935 – 13 February 2018) was a New Zealand cricketer. He played first-class cricket for Auckland and Northern Districts between 1955 and 1963.

== See also ==
- List of Auckland representative cricketers
