= Trevor Lyon =

New Zealand cricketer

Personal information
- Full name: Trevor de Jaques Lyon
- Born: 17 February 1909; Wellington, New Zealand
- Died: 2 June 1984 (aged 75); Thames, New Zealand
- Source: ESPNcricinfo, 15 June 2016

Trevor Lyon (17 February 1909 – 2 June 1984) was a New Zealand cricketer. He played two first-class matches for Auckland in 1931/32.

== See also ==
- List of Auckland representative cricketers
