= Bill Smalley (cricketer) =

New Zealand cricketer (1942–2026)

Howard Alfred Kendall "Bill" Smalley (12 August 1942 – 5 May 2026) was a New Zealand cricketer who played two first-class matches. He made his first-class debut for the New Zealand under-23s against Canterbury in 1965 and the following year made a single appearance for Auckland in the Plunket Shield.

Smalley died in Richmond on 5 May 2026, at the age of 83.

== See also ==
- List of Auckland representative cricketers
