= Tane Topia =

New Zealand cricketer (born 1976)

Personal information
- Full name: Tane Henry Topia
- Born: 18 November 1976 (age 49); Auckland, New Zealand
- Source: ESPNcricinfo, 25 June 2016

Tane Topia (born 18 November 1976) is a New Zealand former cricketer. He played one List A match for Auckland in 2000/01.

== See also ==
- List of Auckland representative cricketers
