= Thomas Wilson (New Zealand cricketer) =

New Zealand cricketer

Personal information
- Full name: Thomas Henry Wilson
- Born: 1869; New Zealand
- Died: 13 November 1918 (aged 48–49); Auckland, New Zealand
- Source: ESPNcricinfo, 26 June 2016

Thomas Wilson (1869 – 13 November 1918) was a New Zealand cricketer. He played one first-class match for Auckland in 1891/92.

== See also ==
- List of Auckland representative cricketers
