= John Worrall (cricketer) =

New Zealand cricketer

Personal information
- Full name: John Henry Worrall
- Born: 26 May 1927; Auckland, New Zealand
- Died: 6 May 2012 (aged 84); Auckland, New Zealand
- Source: ESPNcricinfo, 26 June 2016

John Worrall (26 May 1927 – 6 May 2012) was a New Zealand cricketer. He played nine first-class matches for Auckland between 1951 and 1955.

== See also ==
- List of Auckland representative cricketers
