= Peter McGregor (cricketer) =

New Zealand cricketer (born 1941)

Personal information
- Full name: Peter Brien McGregor
- Born: 28 December 1941 (age 84); Auckland, New Zealand
- Source: ESPNcricinfo, 17 June 2016

Peter McGregor (born 28 December 1941) is a New Zealand former cricketer. He played first-class cricket for Auckland, Central Districts, Northern Districts and Wellington between 1960 and 1975.

== See also ==
- List of Auckland representative cricketers
