= Warwick Smeeton =

New Zealand cricketer

Personal information
- Full name: Warwick James Smeeton
- Born: 29 September 1895; Auckland, New Zealand
- Died: 1 November 1970 (aged 75); Hamilton, New Zealand
- Source: ESPNcricinfo, 21 June 2016

Warwick Smeeton (29 September 1895 – 1 November 1970) was a New Zealand cricketer. He played eight first-class matches for Auckland between 1913 and 1930.

== See also ==
- List of Auckland representative cricketers
