= Howard Ellis (public servant) =

New Zealand lawyer, public servant and cricketer

Sir Howard Ellis MBE
Personal information
- Full name: Samuel Howard Ellis
- Born: 2 June 1889; Waipu, New Zealand
- Died: 19 January 1949 (aged 59); Auckland, New Zealand
- Source: ESPNcricinfo, 7 June 2016

Sir Samuel Howard Ellis MBE (2 June 1889 – 19 January 1949) was a New Zealand lawyer, public servant and cricketer.

== Early life ==
Ellis was born in 1889 in Waipu, where his father was headmaster of the local school. He attended Auckland Grammar School, before studying at Auckland University College.

== Legal career and public service ==
After leaving university, Ellis worked as a lawyer and was called to the bar in New Zealand in 1912. He moved to Fiji the following year.

During World War I he served in the Royal Northumberland Fusiliers and the Royal Flying Corps. He was shot down over France in 1916 and taken prisoner, but was exchanged in 1918 and joined the Royal Air Force. He was awarded a military MBE in 1918. After returning to Fiji following the war, Ellis later joined the civil service and became Director of Labour and National Service. In this role he also served on the Executive Council, and was knighted in the 1943 Birthday Honours.

== Cricket career ==
A wicketkeeper-batsman, Ellis played three first-class cricket matches for Auckland in 1911/12.

== Personal life ==
Ellis married twice. His first marriage was to Mary Mackenzie, the daughter of New Zealand Prime Minister Thomas Mackenzie, in London in 1918. She died in 1924. The second was to Nell Joske in 1926. He died in Auckland in January 1949 at the age of 59.

== See also ==
- List of Auckland representative cricketers
