= Thomas Elliott (New Zealand cricketer) =

New Zealand cricketer

Personal information
- Born: 21 August 1867; Auckland, New Zealand
- Source: ESPNcricinfo, 7 June 2016

Thomas Elliott (born 21 August 1867, date of death unknown) was a New Zealand cricketer. He played twelve first-class matches for Auckland between 1894 and 1906.

== See also ==
- List of Auckland representative cricketers
