= Richard Tovey =

Australian cricketer

Personal information
- Full name: Edward Richard Tovey
- Born: 25 December 1930; Sydney, Australia
- Died: 31 May 2002 (aged 71); Sydney, Australia
- Source: ESPNcricinfo, 25 June 2016

Richard Tovey (25 December 1930 – 31 May 2002) was an Australian cricketer. He played first-class cricket for Auckland and Queensland between 1957 and 1964.

== See also ==
- List of Auckland representative cricketers
