= Adolphus O'Brien =

New Zealand cricketer

Personal information
- Full name: Adolphus O'Brien
- Source: ESPNcricinfo, 19 June 2016

Adolphus O'Brien was a New Zealand cricketer. He played eight first-class matches for Auckland between 1882 and 1890.

He played for Auckland against Shaw's English team in 1882 and against Australia in an intercolonial match in 1886.

== See also ==
- List of Auckland representative cricketers
