= John Williams (Auckland cricketer) =

New Zealand cricketer (1941–2007)

Personal information
- Full name: John Churchill Williams
- Born: 9 May 1941; Gisborne, New Zealand
- Died: 17 March 2007 (aged 65); Auckland, New Zealand
- Source: ESPNcricinfo, 26 June 2016

John Williams (9 May 1941 – 17 March 2007) was a New Zealand cricketer. He played six first-class matches for Auckland between 1970 and 1974.

== See also ==
- List of Auckland representative cricketers
