= Robert McPherson (cricketer) =

New Zealand cricketer

Personal information
- Born: 1 January 1864; Christchurch, New Zealand
- Died: 13 October 1904 (aged 40); Auckland, New Zealand
- Source: ESPNcricinfo, 17 June 2016

Robert McPherson (1 January 1864 – 13 October 1904) was a New Zealand cricketer. He played three first-class matches for Auckland in 1889/90.

== See also ==
- List of Auckland representative cricketers
