= David Perry (cricketer) =

New Zealand cricketer

Personal information
- Full name: David Leighton Perry
- Born: 30 June 1929; Auckland, New Zealand
- Died: 23 August 2007 (aged 78); Auckland, New Zealand
- Source: ESPNcricinfo, 19 June 2016

David Perry (30 June 1929 – 23 August 2007) was a New Zealand cricketer. He played twenty-one first-class matches for Auckland between 1949 and 1959.

== See also ==
- List of Auckland representative cricketers
