= Ernest Horspool =

New Zealand cricketer

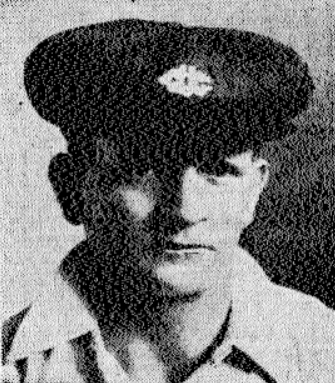

Personal information
- Born: 23 August 1891; Dargaville, New Zealand
- Died: 21 June 1957 (aged 65); Auckland, New Zealand
- Batting: Right-handed

Domestic team information
- Years: Team
- 1909/10–1928/29: Auckland

Career statistics
Competition	First-class
Matches	39
Runs scored	1,686
Batting average	24.43
100s/50s	2/7
Top score	143
Balls bowled	723
Wickets	9
Bowling average	50.44
5 wickets in innings	0
10 wickets in match	0
Best bowling	2/15
Catches/stumpings	27/–
- Source: Cricinfo, 17 October 2021

Ernest Horspool (23 August 1891 – 21 June 1957) was a New Zealand cricketer. He played first-class cricket for Auckland between 1909 and 1929, and represented New Zealand in the period before New Zealand played Test cricket.

== Cricket career ==
Horspool was a middle-order or opening batsman. He made his first first-class century in 1913–14 in Auckland's victory over Wellington, scoring 54 and 113 in a match in which nobody else reached 50. He played in the first of the two matches New Zealand played against the touring Australians later that season but was unsuccessful, and was one of seven in the New Zealand team who lost their places for the second match.

He made his second century against the touring Victorian team 11 years later in 1924–25, when he scored 143 in three hours and added 212 for the second wicket with Nessie Snedden. In a long career in senior club cricket for Grafton in Auckland he scored more than 13,000 runs.

== Personal life ==
The eighth son of a large family, Horspool married Isabel Jessie Smith in Auckland in January 1920. He worked in Auckland as a dairyman. He died aged 65 in June 1957, survived by his wife and their son and daughter.
