= Harold Walton (cricketer) =

New Zealand cricketer

Personal information
- Born: 1874
- Died: 9 December 1960 (aged 85–86); Auckland, New Zealand
- Source: ESPNcricinfo, 26 June 2016

Harold Walton (1874 – 9 December 1960) was a New Zealand cricketer. He played one first-class match for Auckland in the 1897/98 season.

== See also ==
- List of Auckland representative cricketers
