= Glen Hook =

New Zealand cricketer

Personal information
- Full name: Glen Hall Hook
- Born: 1 April 1917; Auckland, New Zealand
- Died: 8 November 1972 (aged 55); Auckland, New Zealand
- Source: Cricinfo, 12 June 2016

Glen Hook (1 April 1917 – 8 November 1972) was a New Zealand cricketer. He played eight first-class matches for Auckland between 1935 and 1943.

== See also ==
- List of Auckland representative cricketers
