= John Carson (cricketer) =

New Zealand cricketer (born 1945)

Personal information
- Born: 8 July 1945 (age 81); Auckland, New Zealand
- Source: ESPNcricinfo, 5 June 2016

John Carson (born 8 July 1945) is a New Zealand former cricketer. He played first-class cricket for Auckland and Northern Districts between 1963 and 1974.

== See also ==
- List of Auckland representative cricketers
