= Randall Carrington =

New Zealand cricketer (1934–2018)

Personal information
- Full name: Randall Marsack Carrington
- Born: 31 March 1934; Whangārei, New Zealand
- Died: 20 December 2018 (aged 84); Auckland, New Zealand
- Source: ESPNcricinfo, 4 June 2016

Randall Marsack Carrington (31 March 1934 – 20 December 2018) was a New Zealand cricketer who bowled left-arm spin. He played five first-class matches for Auckland in 1953/54.

== See also ==
- List of Auckland representative cricketers
