= Peter Morris (cricketer) =

New Zealand cricketer

Personal information
- Full name: Peter Philip Woodward Morris
- Born: 3 December 1937 (age 88); Auckland, New Zealand
- Source: ESPNcricinfo, 19 June 2016

Peter Morris (born 3 December 1937) is a former New Zealand cricketer. He played ten first-class matches for Auckland between 1961 and 1963.

== See also ==
- List of Auckland representative cricketers
