= William Stephens (cricketer) =

New Zealand cricketer

Personal information
- Full name: William Bowden Stephens
- Born: 14 April 1870; Pennsylvania, United States
- Died: 14 July 1954 (aged 84); Auckland, New Zealand
- Source: ESPNcricinfo, 22 June 2016

William Stephens (14 April 1870 – 14 July 1954) was a New Zealand cricketer. He played five first-class matches for Auckland between 1899 and 1901.

== See also ==
- List of Auckland representative cricketers
