= Lindsay Rewcastle =

New Zealand cricketer (born 1955)

Personal information
- Full name: Lindsay John Rewcastle
- Born: 5 February 1955 (age 71); Invercargill, New Zealand
- Source: ESPNcricinfo, 20 June 2016

Lindsay Rewcastle (born 5 February 1955) is a New Zealand former cricketer. He played six first-class matches for Auckland in 1979/80.

== See also ==
- List of Auckland representative cricketers
