= Herbert Simpson (cricketer) =

New Zealand cricketer

Personal information
- Born: 4 August 1886; Auckland, New Zealand
- Died: 8 March 1950 (aged 63); Auckland, New Zealand
- Source: ESPNcricinfo, 21 June 2016

Herbert Simpson (4 August 1886 – 8 March 1950) was a New Zealand cricketer. He played one first-class match for Auckland in 1917/18.

== See also ==
- List of Auckland representative cricketers
