= Reginald Whelan =

New Zealand cricketer

Personal information
- Full name: Reginald Francis William Whelan
- Born: 26 August 1900; Auckland, New Zealand
- Died: 10 July 1970 (aged 69); Auckland, New Zealand
- Source: ESPNcricinfo, 26 June 2016

Reginald Whelan (26 August 1900 – 10 July 1970) was a New Zealand cricketer. He played four first-class matches for Auckland in 1922/23.

== See also ==
- List of Auckland representative cricketers
