= Nigel Scott =

New Zealand cricketer (born 1961)

Personal information
- Full name: Nigel Alexander Scott
- Born: 19 December 1961 (age 64); Bristol, England
- Source: ESPNcricinfo, 20 June 2016

Nigel Scott (born 19 December 1961) is a New Zealand former cricketer. He played sixteen first-class and ten List A matches for Auckland between 1980 and 1988.

== See also ==
- List of Auckland representative cricketers
