= Peter Neutze =

New Zealand cricketer (born 1963)

Personal information
- Full name: Peter Stephen Neutze
- Born: 5 September 1963 (age 63); Auckland, New Zealand
- Batting: Right-handed
- Bowling: Right arm leg break

Domestic team information
- Years: Team
- 1984/85: Otago
- 1987/88–1988/89: Auckland
- 1989/90: Northern Districts

Career statistics
Competition	First-class	List A
Matches	15	6
Runs scored	107	11
Batting average	8.91	5.50
100s/50s	0/0	0/0
Top score	40	10
Balls bowled	2,775	72
Wickets	30	0
Bowling average	44.53	–
5 wickets in innings	1	–
10 wickets in match	0	–
Best bowling	5/109	–
Catches/stumpings	5/–	0/–
- Source: Cricinfo, 26 February 2010

Peter Stephen Neutze (born 5 September 1963) is a New Zealand former cricketer. He played 15 first-class cricket and six List A matches for Otago, Auckland, and Northern Districts between the 1984–85 and 1989–90 seasons.

Neutze was born at Auckland in 1963. He played as a right-arm leg-spin bowler. His best innings figures came in his debut match when he took 5 for 109 for Otago against Central Districts in January 1985. His best match figures came four years later for Auckland, when he took seven wickets – 4 for 41 and 3 for 71 – against Central Districts in February 1989. A tail-end batsman, in his last first-class match in February 1990 he scored 40 for Northern Districts, adding 85 for the ninth wicket in 53 minutes with Brendon Bracewell against Otago.

Professionally Neutze worked as a lawyer until he was indefinitely suspended in 2006 after a series of complaints made against him.
