= William Robinson (cricketer, born 1847) =

New Zealand cricketer

Personal information
- Full name: William Wills Robinson
- Born: 17 June 1847; Birmingham, England
- Died: 14 September 1929 (aged 82); Wellingborough, England
- Bowling: Slow left-arm

Domestic team information
- Years: Team
- 1873/74–1884/85: Auckland

Career statistics
| Competition | First-class |
|---|---|
| Matches | 12 |
| Runs scored | 248 |
| Batting average | 11.80 |
| 100s/50s | 0/0 |
| Top score | 42 not out |
| Balls bowled | 1,292 |
| Wickets | 41 |
| Bowling average | 12.70 |
| 5 wickets in innings | 2 |
| 10 wickets in match | 1 |
| Best bowling | 5/13 |
| Catches/stumpings | 45/– |
- Source: ESPNcricinfo, 31 December 2019

William Wills Robinson (17 June 1847 – 14 September 1929) was an English-born New Zealand cricketer. He played 12 first-class matches for Auckland between 1873 and 1885.

Robinson was educated at Epsom College in England before moving to New Zealand, where he lived from about 1868 to 1889. A tall man with a curly black beard, he was a slow left-arm bowler, "a free bat and a great fighter", and an outstanding captain. He captained Auckland in all 12 of his matches. Leading them on their southern tour in late 1873, when they played their first first-class matches, he took 20 wickets at an average of 7.30, and they won all three matches. He had a sporting goods store in Auckland before returning to England in 1889.

Robinson was also one of the pioneers of rugby football in New Zealand, helping to establish the game in Auckland soon after his arrival in New Zealand in about 1868. In 1905, after he returned to England to live in Wellingborough, he wrote a series of articles on the early history of rugby in New Zealand for The Pall Mall Gazette. He coached the boys at Wellingborough School for more than 30 years.
