= Robert Sutton (cricketer, born 1940) =

New Zealand cricketer (born 1940)

Personal information
- Full name: Robert Edwin Sutton
- Born: 30 May 1940 (age 86); Romford, Essex, England
- Batting: Right-handed
- Bowling: Left-arm fast-medium
- Role: Opening bowler

Domestic team information
- Years: Team
- 1958/59–1973/74: Auckland

Career statistics
Competition	FC	List A
Matches	56	5
Runs scored	516	3
Batting average	11.46	–
100s/50s	0/0	0/0
Top score	39	3*
Balls bowled	9,412	296
Wickets	156	7
Bowling average	22.41	21.71
5 wickets in innings	6	0
10 wickets in match	0	0
Best bowling	7/64	2/31
Catches/stumpings	14/–	1/–
- Source: Cricinfo, 7 April 2025

Robert Edwin Sutton (born 30 May 1940) is a New Zealand former cricketer. He played 56 first-class matches, most of them for Auckland, between 1958 and 1974.

Sutton was a left-arm fast-medium bowler and tail-end batsman. He was for some years considered a bowler of Test potential, and was selected for teams of young New Zealand players against touring Test teams three times in the 1960s, but was never selected in the Test team. He took his best figures of 7 for 64 and 2 for 35 when Auckland defeated Wellington in the final game of the 1963–64 Plunket Shield, giving Auckland a narrow victory in the tournament. In the 1962–63 Plunket Shield he took 6 for 14 and 2 for 20 (match figures of 33.4–19–34–8) in an innings victory over Otago.
