= John Ansenne =

New Zealand cricketer

Personal information
- Born: 1 July 1861; Auckland, New Zealand
- Died: 28 April 1939 (aged 77); Thames, New Zealand

Domestic team information
- Years: Team
- 1893/94: Auckland
- Source: ESPNcricinfo, 20 August 2024

John Ansenne (1 July 1861 – 28 April 1939) was a New Zealand cricketer who played one first-class match for Auckland during the 1893–94 season.

Ansenne was born at Auckland in 1860. He was sent to Europe to be educated, attending schools at Mons and Liege in Belgium before returning to New Zealand aged 21. He worked in the daily business, timber merchants Sharpe and Ansenne, before later becoming a stockbroker and a solicitor.

In his only first-class match Ansenne opened the batting for Auckland but made scores of only four and six runs against Wellington in December 1893 at the Auckland Domain ground, the province's first match of the season; he did not bowl. He was "very well known in sport" and was a notable yacht racer in particular as well as a prominent player of polo.

Ansenne died at Thames in 1939 aged 77.
