= Charles Osmond =

New Zealand cricketer

Personal information
- Full name: Charles Henry Osmond
- Born: 1859; St Davids, Devon, England
- Died: 20 October 1937 (aged 77–78); Auckland, New Zealand

Domestic team information
- Years: Team
- 1884/85: Auckland
- Source: ESPNcricinfo, 19 June 2016

Charles Henry Osmond (1859 – 20 October 1937) was a New Zealand sportsman. He played two first-class cricket matches for Auckland during the 1884–85 season and lawn tennis for Taranaki.

Osmond was born at St David's in Devon in 1859 and educated at Mansion House School in London. After migrating to New Zealand he worked as a land agent and in the insurance industry, initially at Auckland before becoming the Otago district agent for Colonial Mutual Life Office in 1893. He had interests in the gold mining industry and registers several patents, the most important of which was an improved method of retrieving gold from dredge tables. He also patented a lure used by anglers worldwide.

Both of Osmond's first-class matches for Auckland were played during the 1884–85 season. He kept wicket on debut against Canterbury at Lancaster Park in January 1885, taking scores of 19 and 16, before playing later in the same month against Wellington at the Basin Reserve, scoring eight and naught not out. He played club cricket for Auckland Cricket Club and was the club's secretary and treasurer.

Osmond died at Auckland in 1937.
