= Andrew de Boorder =

New Zealand cricketer

Personal information
- Full name: Andrew Philip de Boorder
- Born: 6 July 1988 (age 38); Hastings, New Zealand
- Batting: Right-handed
- Bowling: Right-arm medium
- Role: Batsman
- Relatives: Derek de Boorder (brother)

Domestic team information
- Years: Team
- 2007/08–2011/12: Auckland

Career statistics
Competition	First-class	List A
Matches	30	6
Runs scored	1,496	172
Batting average	31.82	43.00
100s/50s	3/7	0/2
Top score	150*	57
Balls bowled	648	–
Wickets	10	–
Bowling average	43.00	–
5 wickets in innings	0	–
10 wickets in match	0	–
Best bowling	3/108	–
Catches/stumpings	18/–	2/–
- Source: CricInfo, 25 June 2023

Andrew Philip de Boorder (born 6 July 1988) is a New Zealand former cricketer who played for Auckland between the 2007–08 and 2011–12 seasons.

De Boorder attended Macleans College in his early high school years and later attended King's College, Auckland. He played for New Zealand in the 2006 Under-19 Cricket World Cup held in Sri Lanka. He made his senior debut for Auckland in March 2008, scoring 88 runs, and went on to play 36 matches for the side. He played club cricket for Howick Pakuranga Cricket Club.
