= Keeley Todd =

Personal information
- Full name: Keeley William Martin Todd
- Born: 31 July 1982 (age 44); Auckland, New Zealand
- Batting: Left-handed
- Bowling: Right-arm medium-fast
- Role: Batsman

Domestic team information
- Years: Team
- 2004/05–2009/10: Auckland

Career statistics
Competition	FC	LA	T20
Matches	5	5	4
Runs scored	129	48	30
Batting average	16.12	9.60	15.00
100s/50s	0/1	0/0	0/0
Top score	84	19	29
Balls bowled	–	60	12
Wickets	–	2	0
Bowling average	–	32.00	–
5 wickets in innings	–	0	–
10 wickets in match	–	0	–
Best bowling	–	1/20	–
Catches/stumpings	2/–	0/–	0/–
- Source: CricInfo, 25 August 2024

Keeley William Martin Todd (born 31 July 1982) is a New Zealand former cricketer who played for Auckland between the 2004–05 season and 2009–10.

Todd was born at Auckland in 1982 and was educated at Auckland Grammar School.
