= Donald Hill (cricketer) =

New Zealand cricketer (born 1940)

Personal information
- Born: 6 January 1940 (age 86); Christchurch, New Zealand
- Source: ESPNcricinfo, 12 June 2016

Donald Hill (born 6 January 1940) is a New Zealand former cricketer. He played first-class cricket for Auckland and Canterbury between 1961 and 1968.

== See also ==
- List of Auckland representative cricketers
