= Felix Kelly (cricketer) =

New Zealand cricketer

Personal information
- Full name: Felix Vincent Kelly
- Born: 26 September 1866; Alma Plains, South Australia
- Died: 31 January 1945 (aged 78); Wellington, New Zealand

Domestic team information
- Years: Team
- 1889/90–1897/98: Auckland

Career statistics
Competition	First-class
Matches	8
Runs scored	31
Batting average	4.42
100s/50s	0/0
Top score	8
Balls bowled	992
Wickets	32
Bowling average	10.59
5 wickets in innings	1
10 wickets in match	0
Best bowling	5/30
Catches/stumpings	3/–
- Source: CricketArchive, 10 November 2018

Felix Vincent Kelly (26 September 1866 – 31 January 1945) was a New Zealand cricketer. He played eight first-class matches for Auckland between 1889 and 1898.

Felix Kelly was a bowler. He took his best figures of 5 for 30 in his last first-class match, against Hawke's Bay in 1897–98. In a senior club match in Auckland in 1896 he took 9 for 29 in an innings and caught the other batsman.

Kelly was also one of the best rifle shooters in the Auckland area. He worked as a civil engineer and surveyor.

He and his wife Hortense (née Runcie) had two sons. He died in Wellington after a short illness.
