= Greg Morgan =

New Zealand cricketer (born 1989)

Personal information
- Full name: Greg Jan Morgan
- Born: 6 February 1989 (age 37); East London, South Africa
- Source: ESPNcricinfo, 18 June 2016

Greg Morgan (born 6 February 1989) is a New Zealand former cricketer. He played four first-class and four List A matches for Auckland between 2007 and 2009.

== See also ==
- List of Auckland representative cricketers
