= Andrew Labatt =

New Zealand cricketer

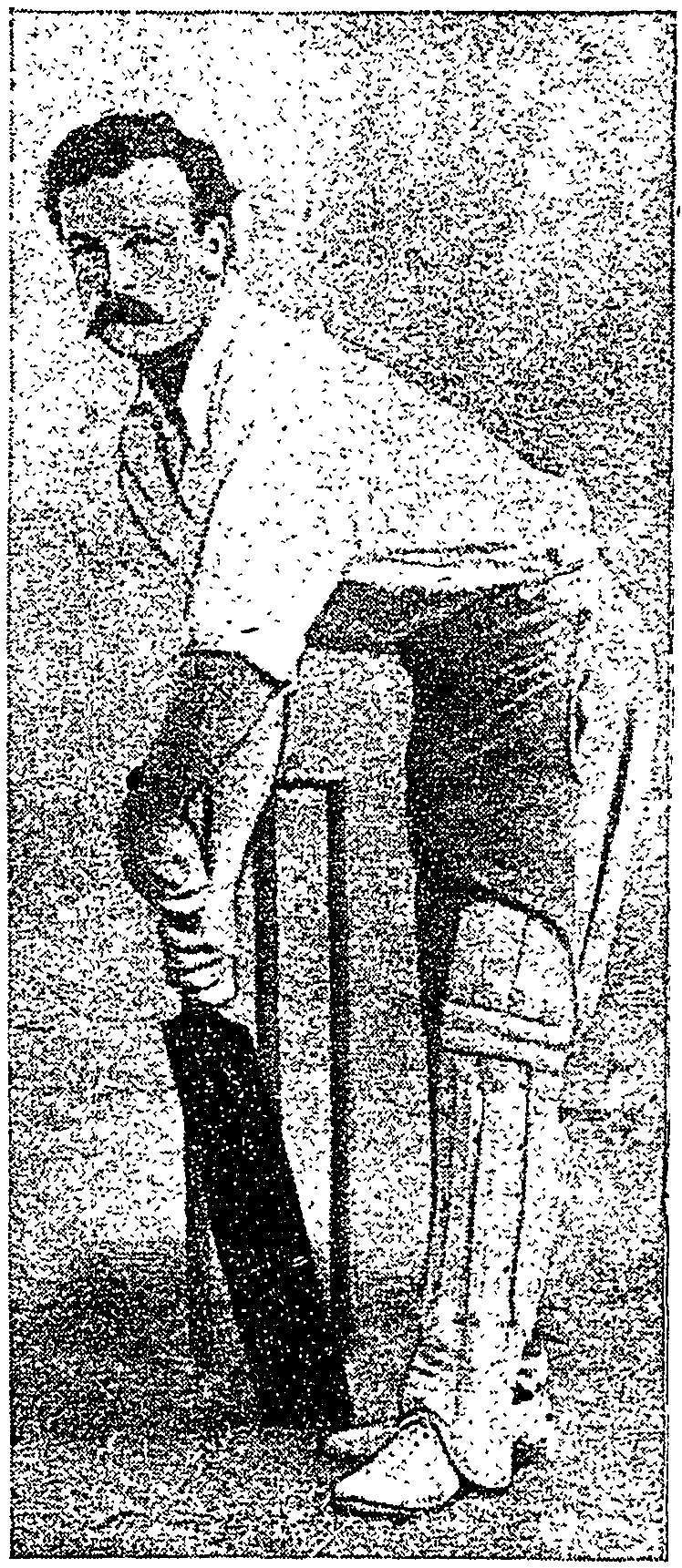
- Labatt in 1899

Personal information
- Full name: Andrew Brennan Mountjoye Labatt
- Born: 1 March 1869; Lambeth, England
- Died: 27 April 1922 (aged 53); Auckland, New Zealand
- Role: All-rounder

Domestic team information
- Years: Team
- 1887/88–1895/96: Canterbury
- 1897/98: Auckland

Career statistics
Competition	First-class
Matches	21
Runs scored	566
Batting average	15.29
100s/50s	0/1
Top score	57
Balls bowled	2,527
Wickets	41
Bowling average	18.36
5 wickets in innings	2
10 wickets in match	0
Best bowling	5/17
Catches/stumpings	30/–
- Source: ESPNcricinfo, 28 February 2019

Andrew Labatt (1 March 1869 – 27 April 1922) was a New Zealand cricketer. He played first-class cricket for Canterbury and Auckland between 1888 and 1898.

== Early life and cricket career ==
Labatt was born in London. His father was a clergyman in Swindon, Wiltshire. He attended several schools, finally St Edward's School, Oxford, where he was prominent in sport, before moving to New Zealand in 1887.

Labatt was a middle-order batsman and a bowler who sometimes opened the attack. He was short of stature, "handsome and debonair", and a fine slips fieldsman. He played for Canterbury soon after arriving in New Zealand. In his second first-class match, in January 1889, he opened the bowling against Otago and bowled throughout the first innings, taking 5 for 17 as Otago were dismissed for 47. In his next match, against Wellington in December 1889, he made the highest score in a low-scoring match with 47 in the first innings.

When New South Wales toured New Zealand in 1893-94 they were undefeated in their first three first-class matches, but when they played Canterbury, Labatt made 42 and took five wickets in an innings victory for Canterbury. He was included in the team a few days later for New Zealand's first first-class representative match, against New South Wales in Christchurch. New Zealand lost heavily, but Labatt top-scored in the second innings with 17. He also played the next time New Zealand played New South Wales, in 1895–96. This time he was more successful in the field, with four fine catches, and New Zealand won by 142 runs.

He moved to Auckland a few weeks after the match against New South Wales, and played two matches for Auckland in 1897–98, captaining the team in his last match.

== Later life ==
Labatt married Gertrude Constance Rowe, whose father was also an English clergyman, in Auckland in March 1896. He worked in Auckland as an accountant.

He served in the New Zealand Expeditionary Force during World War I. He was on the permanent medical staff of the transport ship RMS Tahiti in 1918 when an outbreak of Spanish influenza caused high mortality amongst the troops on board.

When Labatt died in April 1922, Gertrude survived him, along with four sons and a daughter.
