= Frederick Middleton (cricketer) =

Australian cricketer

Personal information
- Full name: Frederick Stewart Middleton
- Born: 28 May 1883; Boorowa, New South Wales, Australia
- Died: 21 July 1956 (aged 73); Auckland, New Zealand
- Batting: Right-handed
- Bowling: Right-arm medium

Domestic team information
- Years: Team
- 1905/06–1909/10: New South Wales
- 1917/18: Auckland
- 1919/20–1921/22: Wellington

Career statistics
Competition	First-class
Matches	14
Runs scored	355
Batting average	15.43
100s/50s	0/1
Top score	70
Balls bowled	1,528
Wickets	56
Bowling average	16.28
5 wickets in innings	5
10 wickets in match	2
Best bowling	7/36
Catches/stumpings	6/–
- Source: ESPNcricinfo, 22 October 2021

Frederick Stewart Middleton (28 May 1883 – 21 July 1956) was an Australian cricketer who moved to New Zealand during his playing career. He played first-class cricket for New South Wales, Auckland and Wellington between 1905 and 1922, and represented New Zealand in the days before New Zealand played Test cricket.

Middleton married Brenda Macalister, a granddaughter of the 19th-century Queensland Premier Arthur Macalister, in Brisbane in September 1910. They lived in Sydney until about 1916, when they moved to Auckland.

Middleton was an all-rounder, a right-handed middle-order batsman and right-arm medium-pace bowler. He was in outstanding form for Wellington in two first-class matches against Hawke's Bay towards the end of the 1919–20 season. In the first, he took 6 for 56 and 7 for 36; in the second, he took 5 for 81 and 5 for 51 and scored 34 and 30.

The next season, when the touring Australians played Wellington, Middleton top-scored with 70 and took six wickets. He was chosen for the New Zealand team that played Australia in the first of the two matches that followed shortly afterwards, but was not successful.
