= Samuel Alpe =

New Zealand cricketer

Personal information
- Born: 29 March 1834; Swaffham, Norfolk, England
- Died: 30 July 1918 (aged 84); Wellington, New Zealand
- Role: Batsman

Domestic team information
- Years: Team
- 1873/74: Auckland
- 1875/76–1879/80: Canterbury
- 1882/83–1884/85: Wellington

Career statistics
| Competition | First-class |
|---|---|
| Matches | 13 |
| Runs scored | 242 |
| Batting average | 11.52 |
| 100s/50s | 0/0 |
| Top score | 29* |
| Catches/stumpings | 6/0 |
- Source: ESPNcricinfo, 18 August 2024

Samuel Alpe (29 March 1834 – 30 July 1918) was a New Zealand cricketer. He played first-class cricket for Auckland, Canterbury and Wellington between 1873 and 1885.

Alpe was born in England and fought in the Crimean War before moving to New Zealand in 1859. He was a storekeeper in Auckland before joining the forces fighting the New Zealand Wars in the 1860s. He was in charge of army service stores in the Thames and Waikato regions before going into business in Auckland and Christchurch. Finally he moved to Wellington, where he worked in the Stores Branch of the Railways Department for more than 30 years.

Alpe was a batsman with "a strong defence and much patience" and a fine fieldsman. He was one of the main batsmen on Auckland's southern tour in 1873, the first internal cricket tour in New Zealand, when Auckland won all four matches. His highest first-class score was 29 not out for Wellington in their victory over Hawke's Bay in 1883–84, when he top-scored in the first innings. He won a prize for his fielding when Canterbury lost narrowly to the touring English team in 1876–77, when the English veteran player James Southerton judged him to be the best long stop in New Zealand.

Alpe was married twice. He had five sons and three daughters. He died of heart disease in Wellington in July 1918, aged 84.
