= Nicholas Turner (cricketer) =

New Zealand cricketer

Nic Turner
Personal information
- Full name: Nicholas Mirek Turner
- Born: 3 August 1983 (age 43); Invercargill, Southland, New Zealand
- Batting: Left-handed
- Bowling: Right-arm fast-medium
- Role: Bowler

Domestic team information
- Years: Team
- 2002/03–2008/09: Southland
- 2006/07–2007/08: Otago
- 2009/10: Auckland
- Source: CricInfo, 26 May 2016

Nicholas Mirek Turner (born 3 August 1983) is a New Zealand former cricketer. He played first-class cricket for Otago and Auckland between the 2006–07 and 2009–10 seasons.

Turner was born at Invercargill in the Southland Region of New Zealand in 1983. He played club cricket for Appleby Cricket Club in the city and for Otago age-group sides from 1999–2000. he made his Hawke Cup debut for Southland during the 2002–03 season and made his senior debut for Otago in a December 2006 List A match against Northern Districts.

Primarily a right-arm seam bowler, Turner played 19 times for the senior Otago team during the 2006–07 and 2007–08 seasons. He took seven first-class wickets in three matches, as well as 12 List A and three Twenty20 wickets. After playing for Southland during the 2008–09 season he moved to Auckland for the 2009–10 season, making a single first-class appearance for the side.
