= Percy White (cricketer) =

New Zealand cricketer

Personal information
- Full name: Percy Claude White
- Born: 26 June 1868; Auckland, New Zealand
- Died: 19 October 1946 (aged 78); Auckland, New Zealand
- Source: ESPNcricinfo, 26 June 2016

Percy White (26 June 1868 – 19 October 1946) was a New Zealand cricketer. He played two first-class matches for Auckland between 1906 and 1908.

White made his first-class debut at the age of 38 for Auckland against the touring MCC side in December 1906. A last-minute replacement for an unavailable player, he took 6 for 21 in the first innings, varying his pace and length and deceiving the batsmen with his flight. However, he played only once more.

== See also ==
- List of Auckland representative cricketers
