= Richard King (New Zealand cricketer) =

New Zealand cricketer (born 1973)

Personal information
- Full name: Richard Terrence King
- Born: 23 April 1973 (age 53); Wellington, New Zealand
- Batting: Right-handed
- Bowling: Right-arm slow-medium
- Role: Batsman

Domestic team information
- Years: Team
- 1990/91–1992/93: Southland
- 1991/92–1995/96: Otago
- 1996/97–2000/01: Auckland
- 2001/02: Hawke's Bay
- 2001/02: Central Districts
- 2002/03: Auckland
- FC debut: 16 January 1992 Otago v Auckland
- Last FC: 10 December 2002 Auckland v Central Districts
- LA debut: 30 December 1994 Otago v Auckland
- Last LA: 25 January 2002 Central Districts v Otago

Career statistics
Competition	First-class	List A
Matches	41	17
Runs scored	1,775	342
Batting average	24.65	26.30
100s/50s	3/7	0/2
Top score	130*	55
Catches/stumpings	29/–	6/–
- Source: ESPNcricinfo, 15 May 2016

Richard Terrence King (born 23 April 1973) is a New Zealand former cricketer. He played first-class cricket for Auckland, Central Districts and Otago between the 1991–92 and 2002–03 seasons.

King was born at Wellington in 1973. He played Hawke Cup cricket for Southland in 1990–91 before making his first-class debut for Otago the following season.

In a career that spanned twelve seasons, King played for Otago, Auckland and Central Districts in first-class and List A cricket. As well as Southland, he played in the Hawke Cup for Auckland, Auckland-Waitakere and Hawke's Bay. He made a total of 41 first-class, 17 List A and nine Hawke Cup appearances, scoring 1,775 first-class runs. His three centuries in first-class cricket included an unbeaten 130, made for Auckland against Otago in 1998–99.
