= John Cushen =

New Zealand cricketer

Personal information
- Full name: John Arthur James Cushen
- Born: 15 February 1950 (age 76); Dunedin, Otago, New Zealand
- Batting: Right-handed
- Bowling: Right-arm fast-medium

Domestic team information
- Years: Team
- 1967/68–1972/73: Otago
- 1976/77–1982/83: Auckland
- 1984/85–1986/87: Otago
- FC debut: 9 January 1968 Otago v Canterbury
- Last FC: 5 February 1987 Otago v Auckland
- LA debut: 3 December 1972 Otago v Canterbury
- Last LA: 4 January 1987 Otago v Canterbury

Career statistics
Competition	First-class	List A
Matches	69	33
Runs scored	466	61
Batting average	9.91	6.10
100s/50s	0/0	0/0
Top score	44	19*
Balls bowled	13,928	1,830
Wickets	194	48
Bowling average	28.77	21.52
5 wickets in innings	4	0
10 wickets in match	0	0
Best bowling	6/27	4/30
Catches/stumpings	19/–	9/–
- Source: CricketArchive, 19 November 2008

John Arthur James Cushen (born 12 February 1950) is a former New Zealand cricketer who played twenty years of first-class cricket for Auckland and Otago from 1967 to 1987. A right-arm fast-medium bowler, Cushen took 194 wickets at 28.77 during his career, while his right-handed batting late in the batting order earned him a high score of 44 however an average of 9.91.

== Career ==
Cushen was born in February 1950 at Dunedin in Otago. He was educated at King's High School in the city.

=== Debut ===
Cushen played his first match for Otago on 9 January 1968 as in the Plunket Shield against Canterbury. He took one wicket in the first innings for 62 runs, scored nine and a duck as Otago was forced to follow on, and saw his team slip to an innings and 44 run defeat. In his first full season across the summer of 1968–69, Cushen played five first-class matches in which he scored 74 runs at 12.33 with a best of 27, however he struggled with the ball, taking six wickets at 71.50. Cushen played no matches across the 1969–70 or 1970–71 seasons, and only one in the 1971–72 where he took three wickets at 33.33 each, and scored 23 runs at 11.50. He played three matches across the winter of 1972–73, scoring 25 runs at 5.00, and struggling with the ball, taking three wickets at 79.00. Cushen also played three List-A matches, however he was only required to bat once and was dismissed for a duck. He nevertheless enjoyed success with the ball, taking five wickets at 22.80.

=== Success with the ball ===
Cushen did not play another cricket match until 1976 when he began playing at Auckland, and from then on his bowling improved dramatically. In his first season for his new team, he played seven matches, batted on three occasions and scored 14 runs at 14.00, however with the ball he took 27 wickets at 29.37 including a best of 4/29. He also played two List-A matches, failing to make a score with the bat but taking five wickets at 11.40. In his next season he played a further eight matches, scoring 15 runs at 15.00 and finding more success with the ball by taking 21 wickets at 31.90 with a career best, and maiden five-wicket-haul, of 6/27. He played two List-A matches, making his first runs in the one day form of the game by score two not out, and taking two wickets at 17.00.

The 1978–79 season saw Cushen play seven matches, scoring eight runs, and taking 19 wickets at 26.26. In one day cricket, he played three matches, scoring one run and taking five wickets at 19.80. Over the winter of 1979–80 he played five first-class matches, scoring 39 runs at a career best 19.50, and took eight wickets at 26.75. His one-day batting continued to struggle, with only two runs scored in his only game, and he was unable to take a wicket.

He took a career best seven one day wickets in his next season, however, at 29.00 each, and while he only scored nine runs at 4.50 he was able to score 24 runs at 12.00 in first-class matches and take 23 wickets at 19.30. Cushen did not play any matches over the winter of 1981, however he returned for the 1982–83 season with nine wickets at 30.11 in first-class cricket, and four at 9.50 in List-A. With the bat he enjoyed his most successful season, scoring 30 runs at 18.66 in first-class cricket. He scored a career best 19* in one day batting in the 1984–84 season, following another break from the game, along with a career high 44 runs at 11.80 in first-class matches. With the ball, he reached more career highs, with 31 wickets at 24.12 and a best of 5/37 in first-class matches, and 10 wickets at 13.30 in one day games.

=== Final seasons ===
Cushen played eight first-class matches in the 1985–86 season, scoring 37 runs at 12.33 in first-class matches however only five in List-A cricket. His success with the ball continued, however, matching his achievements from the previous season with 31 wickets at a more effective 22.93, with a best of 6/34, one of two five-wicket hauls. His one-day efforts returned five wickets at 29.20.

Cushen's final season was the winter of 1986–87, where he took five more wickets at 36.60 in one day cricket, and 12 at 33.66 in first-class matches. His batting also declined in his final season, scoring 31 runs at a low average of 3.87 in first-class matches, however improving his one-day batting statistics somewhat with 20 runs at 10.00 thanks to one score of 11*. Cushen retired in early 1987, his last match was played between the two first-class teams he represented. Cushen, playing for Otago, failed to take an Auckland wicket as their batsmen scored 320, and scored only three of Otago's 165 in response. Following on, he made 15, however could not take a wicket in the final innings as Auckland reached their target of little over 100 for the loss of one wicket.

Off the field Cushen has long enjoyed building and sailing yachts.
