= Alfred Sloman =

New Zealand cricketer (1874–1938)

Personal information
- Full name: John Alfred Sloman
- Born: 15 April 1874; Auckland, New Zealand
- Died: 27 August 1938 (aged 64); Auckland, New Zealand

Domestic team information
- Years: Team
- 1903/04: Auckland
- Source: ESPNcricinfo, 21 June 2016

John Alfred Sloman (15 April 1874 – 27 August 1938) was a New Zealand cricketer. He played two first-class matches for Auckland during the 1903–04 season.

Sloman was born at Auckland in 1874 and, after winning a scholarship, educated at Auckland Grammar School. He played club cricket for the Grafton club in Auckland and was considered to be a batsman who could play "freely", with "pretty drives and leg hits" in his repertoire of strokes, although he was also noted to bat "out of his crease" at times. As a bowler he was considered effective at times.

In November 1903 Sloman was selected as one of 16 players to practice ahead of Auckland's representative fixtures later in the season. He was chosen in the final team to play Wellington in a match starting on Christmas Day, opening the batting and recording a duck before dropping down the batting order in Auckland's second innings and scoring 19 runs. He also took his only first-class wicket during the match.

Sloman retained his place in Auckland's side for their next first-class fixture, making scores of 0 and five against Canterbury in early January 1904. He played for the side in odds-matches against the touring Australians in February 1905 and the Melbourne Cricket Club tourists the following year and remained a keen club cricketer for many years. He is also known to have umpired some first-class cricket. He died in 1938 aged 64.
