= Arnold Anthony =

New Zealand cricketer

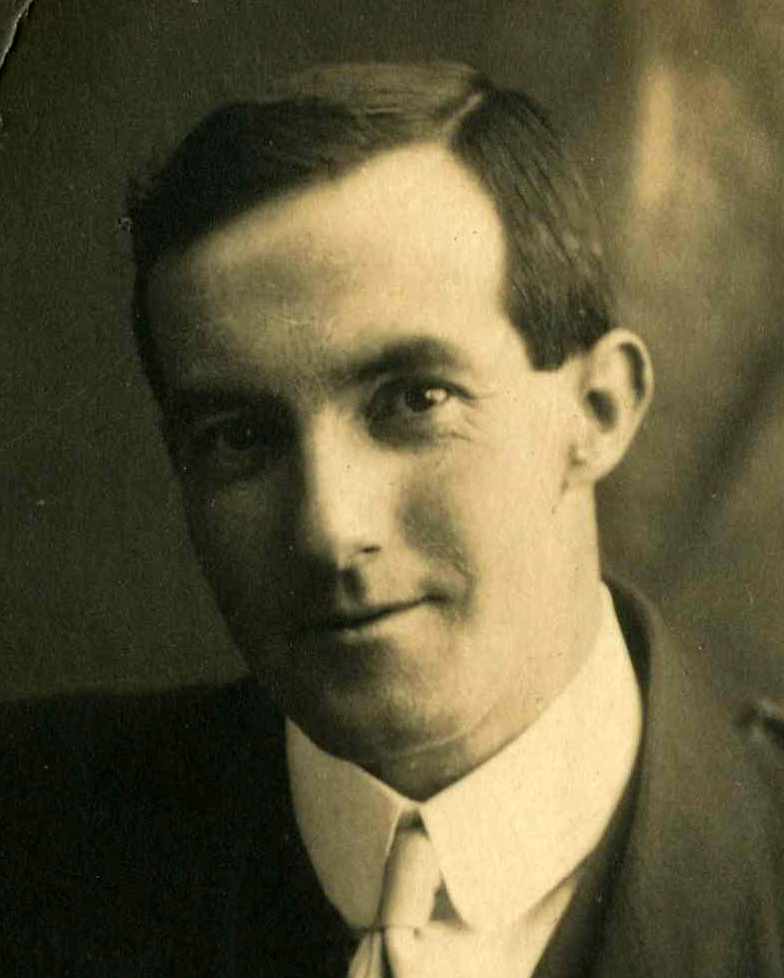
- Anthony pictured in 1916

Personal information
- Born: 28 July 1886; Christchurch, New Zealand
- Died: 14 October 1968 (aged 82); Auckland, New Zealand
- Batting: Right-handed
- Bowling: Right-arm slow

Domestic team information
- Years: Team
- 1905/06–1908/09: Canterbury
- 1909/10–1930/31: Auckland

Career statistics
Competition	First-class
Matches	52
Runs scored	2,386
Batting average	27.42
100s/50s	4/12
Top score	116
Balls bowled	4,170
Wickets	75
Bowling average	24.14
5 wickets in innings	2
10 wickets in match	0
Best bowling	6/43
Catches/stumpings	22/–
- Source: ESPNcricinfo, 9 April 2021

Arnold Anthony (28 July 1886 – 14 October 1968) was a New Zealand cricketer. He played 52 first-class matches for Auckland and Canterbury between 1905 and 1931.

Anthony was a middle-order batsman, strong on the pull and the square cut, an accurate slow bowler, and a brilliant fieldsman. He was the first winner of the Redpath Cup, awarded since 1920–21 to the best New Zealand batsman of the first-class season. He scored 251 runs in the Plunket Shield in 1920–21 at an average of 62.75, including 55 not out and 113 in Auckland's 382-run victory over Canterbury. He made his highest first-class score of 116 against Canterbury in 1929–30, when he was 43. He took his best bowling figures of 6 for 43 against the touring MCC in 1922–23. He played senior club cricket for Parnell in Auckland until November 1937, when he was 51.

He and his wife Clara married in December 1915. He later served overseas with the New Zealand Expeditionary Force in World War I.
