= James Cammish =

English cricketer

Personal information
- Full name: James William Cammish
- Born: 21 May 1921; Scarborough, North Yorkshire, England
- Died: 16 July 1974 (aged 53); Napier, Hawke's Bay, New Zealand.
- Batting: Right-handed
- Bowling: Right-arm leg break

Domestic team information
- Years: Team
- 1950/51: Auckland
- 1954: Yorkshire
- FC debut: 23 December 1950 Auckland v Wellington
- Last FC: 3 July 1954 Yorkshire v Surrey

Career statistics
Competition	First-class
Matches	7
Runs scored	31
Batting average	4.42
100s/50s	0/0
Top score	7*
Balls bowled	1,604
Wickets	25
Bowling average	31.24
5 wickets in innings	2
10 wickets in match	0
Best bowling	6/93
Catches/stumpings	8/–
- Source: CricketArchive, 21 August 2024

James William Cammish (21 March 1921 – 16 July 1974) was an English first-class cricketer, who played five matches for Auckland in 1950–51, and twice for Yorkshire in 1954 against Cambridge University and Surrey.

Born in Scarborough, North Yorkshire, England, Cammish was a leg break and googly bowler who took 25 first-class wickets at 31.24, with a best of 6 for 93 for Auckland against Canterbury. He was less successful with the bat, scoring only 31 runs with a best of 7 not out for an average of 4.41. He also played for Yorkshire's Second XI in 1953 and 1954.

Cammish died in July 1974, aged 53, in Napier, Hawke's Bay, New Zealand.
