= Nicholas Smith (cricketer) =

New Zealand cricketer (born 1946)

Personal information
- Full name: Nicholas George Stanley Smith
- Born: 6 August 1946 (age 80); Dunedin, Otago, New Zealand
- Batting: Right-handed
- Bowling: Right-arm medium-fast

Domestic team information
- Years: Team
- 1969/70: Otago
- 1971/72: Auckland
- Source: CricInfo, 24 May 2016

Nicholas George Stanley Smith (born 6 August 1946) is a New Zealand former cricketer. He played first-class cricket for Otago during the 1969–70 season and Auckland in 1971–72.

Smith was born at Dunedin in 1946. He played age-group cricket for Otago during the 1968–69 season before making his senior representative debut the following season. In his only match for the senior side, Smith, who played primarily as a bowler, opened the bowling for Otago but did not take a wicket against Canterbury at Christchurch in January 1970. During the 1971–72 season he played two List A matches and a further first-class match for Auckland, taking six first-class and a single List A wicket.
