= Tim Lythe =

New Zealand cricketer (born 1980)

Timothy Ignatius Lythe (born 19 April 1980 in Auckland) is a former New Zealand cricketer who played for the Auckland Aces and the Central District Stags in the State Championship. His final game was against the Northern Districts for the Central District Stags in April 2008. In FC format he boasts a batting average of 30.04 and in List A format, an average of 45.

A right-handed batsman and off spinner, he was diagnosed with bone cancer in 1999 at the age of 19 and underwent an operation in which half his left thigh bone was replaced with a titanium rod while his knee was replaced with a complex prosthesis.

In 9 first class matches for Auckland in 2005/06 and 2006/07 he scored 352 runs at an average of 27 with a best of 66 among his three fifties. He also took 8 first class wickets.

== See also ==
- List of Auckland representative cricketers
