= Frederick Byerley =

New Zealand cricketer

Personal information
- Full name: Frederick William Alfred Byerley
- Born: 9 July 1910; Wellington, New Zealand
- Died: 19 August 1994 (aged 84); Auckland, New Zealand
- Source: ESPNcricinfo, 4 June 2016

Frederick Byerley (9 July 1910 – 19 August 1994) was a New Zealand cricketer. He played one first-class match for Auckland in 1931/32.

Byerley's only first-class match was against the touring South Africans in February 1932. In Auckland's first innings he went to the wicket with the score at 123 for 6 and hit 77 at a run a minute.

Byerley served in the New Zealand Expeditionary Force in Europe in World War II. He was captured by the Germans and held at Stalag VIII-B prisoner of war camp. After the war ended in Europe he was a member of the New Zealand Services cricket team that played in England in 1945.

== See also ==
- List of Auckland representative cricketers
