= Bob Sorenson =

New Zealand sportsman

- Born: Robert Gordon Sorenson; 19 September 1923 Auckland, New Zealand
- Died: 25 May 2016 (aged 92) Auckland, New Zealand
- School: Sacred Heart College

Rugby union career
- Position: Fullback
Provincial / State sides
Years	Team	Apps	(Points)
1942–49	Auckland	40	(176)
Coaching career
- Years: Team
- 1964–66: Auckland
- Cricket career

Cricket information
- Batting: Right-handed
- Bowling: Slow left-arm orthodox

Domestic team information
- Years: Team
- 1943/44: Auckland
- FC debut: 25 December 1943 Auckland v Wellington
- Last FC: 1 January 1944 Auckland v Canterbury

Career statistics
Competition	First-class
Matches	2
Runs scored	58
Batting average	29.00
100s/50s	0/0
Top score	29
Balls bowled	375
Wickets	6
Bowling average	31.66
5 wickets in innings	0
10 wickets in match	0
Best bowling	3/43
Catches/stumpings	2/–
- Source: Cricinfo, 21 June 2016

Robert Gordon Sorenson (19 September 1923 – 25 May 2016) was a New Zealand rugby union player and coach, and a cricketer.

== Rugby union ==
A fullback, Sorenson represented Auckland at a provincial level between 1942 and 1949, appearing in 40 matches and scoring 176 points. He went on to coach the Auckland representative team from 1964 until 1966. During his tenure the side lifted the Ranfurly Shield from Taranaki and defeated the touring South African team in 1965. Sorenson was a life member of the New Zealand Barbarian Rugby Club, serving as club captain between 1954 and 1959, and president from 1969 to 1970.

== Cricket ==
Sorenson played two first-class cricket matches for Auckland in the 1943/44 season. A slow left-arm orthodox bowler, he took six wickets at an average of 31.66, and recorded best bowling figures of 3 for 43. With the bat he scored 58 runs at an average of 29.00, and a high score of 29.

== Death ==
Sorenson died in Auckland on 25 May 2016.
