= William McMath =

New Zealand cricketer

Personal information
- Born: 1881; Ireland
- Died: 5 December 1920 (aged 38–39); Auckland, New Zealand
- Source: ESPNcricinfo, 17 June 2016

William McMath (1881 – 5 December 1920) was a New Zealand cricketer. He played three first-class matches for Auckland between 1917 and 1919.

Born in Ireland, McMath moved to New Zealand and lived in the Auckland suburb of Ponsonby, where he ran a grocery in Jervois Road and was a prominent member of Ponsonby Cricket Club. He had an unusual bowling action: he started with a few walking steps, quickened to a run for a few steps, then slowed down to a walk again and was practically still when he delivered the ball.

McMath died in hospital in December 1920 the day after being run over by a tram in Hurstmere Road in the suburb of Takapuna, where he had taken his family for the weekend. He left a widow and three young children.
