= Richard Matthews (cricketer) =

New Zealand cricketer (born 1950)

Personal information
- Full name: Richard Charles Matthews
- Born: 17 May 1950 (age 76); Auckland, New Zealand
- Source: ESPNcricinfo, 18 June 2016

Richard Charles Matthews (born 17 May 1950) is a New Zealand former cricketer. He played twelve first-class matches for Auckland between 1969 and 1976.

== See also ==
- List of Auckland representative cricketers
