= Robert Frater (cricketer) =

New Zealand cricketer

Personal information
- Born: 24 February 1902; Auckland, New Zealand
- Died: 17 August 1968 (aged 66); Nelson, New Zealand
- Source: ESPNcricinfo, 8 June 2016

Robert Frater (24 February 1902 – 17 August 1968) was a New Zealand cricketer. He played fifteen first-class matches for Auckland between 1918 and 1932.

== See also ==
- List of Auckland representative cricketers
