= Tracy Moresby =

New Zealand cricketer (1867–1933)

- Moresby in 1888

Personal information
- Full name: Tracy Archer Moresby
- Born: 1867; Plymouth, England
- Died: 1933 (aged 65 or 66); Melbourne, Australia
- Height: 5 ft 6 1/2 in (1.69 m)

Domestic team information
- Years: Team
- 1889/90–1893/94: Auckland

Career statistics
Competition	First-class
Matches	4
Runs scored	67
Batting average	9.57
100s/50s	0/0
Top score	21
Balls bowled	60
Wickets	0
Bowling average	–
5 wickets in innings	–
10 wickets in match	–
Best bowling	–
Catches/stumpings	1/–
- Source: ESPNcricinfo, 18 June 2016

Tracy Archer Moresby (1867 – 1933) was a New Zealand cricketer, born in England. He played four first-class matches for Auckland between 1889 and 1894.

== Life and career ==
Moresby left England in his teens and went to New Zealand, where he worked as a clerk in the Deeds Office in Auckland. A middle-order batsman and excellent fieldsman, he was Auckland's highest scorer in their low-scoring match against Otago in December 1892, although he scored only 15 and 17. He was also prominent in Auckland as a rugby player and athlete.

Moresby married Edith Halyday in New Zealand in 1893. When he toured with the Auckland team from late December 1893 to mid-January 1894, Edith and her father travelled with him.

He and Edith had three children. They lived in Paeroa, where for some years he worked as a legal official: mining registrar and clerk of courts. He qualified as a solicitor in 1898 and set up a practice in Paeroa.

Edith was granted a judicial separation in April 1921 on the grounds that Moresby had fathered two children with his typist. By the time of the court proceedings, he had left New Zealand.

Moresby died in Melbourne in 1933.
