= Vishi Jeet =

New Zealand cricketer (born 1993)

Personal information
- Full name: Vishwajeet Kumar
- Born: 18 August 1993 (age 33); Muzaffarnagar, India
- Source: ESPNcricinfo, 14 June 2016

Vishwajeet Kumar (born 18 August 1993), known as Vishi Jeet, is a New Zealand cricketer. He plays first-class matches for Auckland.

== See also ==
- List of Auckland representative cricketers
