= Walter Warren =

New Zealand cricketer

Personal information
- Full name: Walter Frederick Warren
- Born: 12 July 1871; Wellington, New Zealand
- Died: 14 August 1944 (aged 73); Devonport, Auckland, New Zealand

Career statistics
Competition	First-class
Matches	5
Runs scored	184
Batting average	23.00
100s/50s	0/1
Top score	50
Balls bowled	162
Wickets	5
Bowling average	14.40
5 wickets in innings	0
10 wickets in match	0
Best bowling	3/11
Catches/stumpings	5/–
- Source: ESPNcricinfo, 16 November 2023

Walter Frederick Warren (12 July 1871 – 14 August 1944) was a New Zealand cricketer. He played first-class cricket for Auckland and Wellington between 1894 and 1898.

Warren was a batsman and occasional bowler. He made his highest first-class score opening the batting for Wellington against the touring New South Wales side in December 1895, when he was the top scorer with 50 out of Wellington's total of 150.

Until his retirement in the 1920s, Warren was on the permanent staff of the New Zealand Defence Force as a warrant officer, serving at the North Head base in Auckland. He died in Auckland in August 1944, aged 73.
