= Basil Totman =

New Zealand cricketer

Personal information
- Born: 1874; Finchingfield, Essex, England
- Died: 2 March 1953 (aged 78–79); Auckland, New Zealand

Domestic team information
- Years: Team
- 1897/98: Auckland
- Source: CricInfo, 25 June 2016

Basil Totman (1874 – 2 March 1953) was an English-born New Zealand cricketer. He played one first-class match for Auckland during the 1897–98 season.

Totman was born at Finchingfield in the English county of Essex in 1874. His family migrated to New Zealand, arriving at Auckland on the barque Lutterworth in January 1884. He played club cricket for Parnell Cricket Club in the city and was considered "well-known" as a club cricketer. He led the club's batting averages in 1996–7 and towards the end of the following season was described by the Auckland Star as a "promising young cricketer" and as "a promising Auckland bat" by the New Zealand Herald.

He made his only first-class appearance for Auckland during March 1898, opening the batting for the representative team against Hawke's Bay, although Trotman only made scores of two and one in his two innings. His fielding was described as "patchy" and his debut described as one which "did not come off at all". The following season he spent time in Christchurch, playing for the Lancaster Park club where he scored "well", before returning to spend time training in England in 1899.

Totman married Hattie Whitehead in 1905. In 1909 he became the owner of a boot and shoe shop in Hamilton and was active in flower show circles. He died at Auckland in March 1953.
