= Allen Player =

New Zealand cricketer (1893–1962)

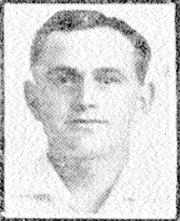

Personal information
- Full name: Allen Shrewsbury Player
- Born: 5 September 1893; Auckland, New Zealand
- Died: 17 November 1962 (aged 69); Auckland, New Zealand
- Batting: Left-handed
- Bowling: Right-arm medium
- Role: All-rounder

Domestic team information
- Years: Team
- 1919/20–1928/29: Auckland

Career statistics
Competition	First-class
Matches	27
Runs scored	572
Batting average	20.42
100s/50s	0/1
Top score	58
Balls bowled	6,229
Wickets	89
Bowling average	26.77
5 wickets in innings	6
10 wickets in match	0
Best bowling	6/38
Catches/stumpings	16/–
- Source: Cricinfo, 30 June 2023

Allen Shrewsbury Player (5 September 1893 – 17 November 1962) was a New Zealand cricketer. He played 27 first-class matches for Auckland between 1919 and 1929.

Player was a right-arm medium-pace bowler who was able to move the ball appreciably through the air and off the pitch, and could bowl unchanged for long spells. He was considered one of New Zealand's best medium-paced bowlers of the 1920s. His best figures were 6 for 38 in Auckland's victory over Canterbury in the Plunket Shield in December 1926. In 1925–26 he was the second-highest wicket-taker in the Plunket Shield with 18 wickets at an average of 23.66. He was also a useful lower-order batsman who could use his reach and hitting power effectively. Against Canterbury in 1925–26 he took 3 for 79 and 4 for 56 and made 58 (adding 112 for the eighth wicket with James Gerrard) and 10.

Player also represented Auckland at hockey. For a time he was chairman of the executive of the Auckland Hockey Association.

Player was admitted to practise as a solicitor in Auckland in May 1921. He married Moyra Kathleen Maud Johnson in Auckland in February 1925.
