= Colin Wallace (cricketer) =

New Zealand cricketer (born 1953)

Colin Wallace (born 2 October 1953 in Auckland) is a first-class cricketer who played three games for Auckland in the 1978–79 season. He was also a right-hand batsman who had a first-class average of 14.66 as well as a wicket-keeper.

== See also ==
- List of Auckland representative cricketers
