= Frederick Ohlson =

New Zealand cricketer

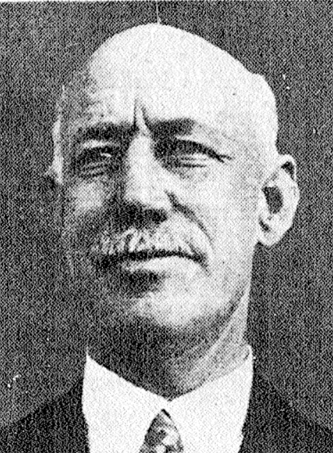

Personal information
- Full name: Frederick John Ohlson
- Born: 29 June 1865; Auckland, New Zealand
- Died: 20 May 1942 (aged 76); Epsom, Auckland, New Zealand
- Nickname: Curly
- Role: Batsman

Domestic team information
- Years: Team
- 1894/95–1902/03: Auckland

Career statistics
Competition	First-class
Matches	11
Runs scored	209
Batting average	13.06
100s/50s	0/1
Top score	59*
Catches/stumpings	5/–
- Source: ESPNcricinfo, 19 June 2016

Frederick John Ohlson (29 June 1865 – 20 May 1942) was a New Zealand cricketer. He played eleven first-class matches for Auckland between 1894 and 1903.

A middle-order batsman, Ohlson's highest first-class score was 59 not out, which was also Auckland's highest score in the drawn match against the touring New South Wales team in January 1896.

After his playing career, Ohlson became a prominent administrator of cricket in Auckland. He also administered rugby union after a successful career in the game, in which he represented Auckland. He also coached tennis, and was a life member of 11 sporting organisations.

Ohlson worked as a schoolteacher in and around Auckland, finishing his career by serving as headmaster at Maungawhau School in Mount Eden for 15 years. He died at his home in the Auckland suburb of Epsom in May 1942, aged 76, leaving his wife Janet and their four sons.
