= Ivan Cooper (cricketer) =

New Zealand cricketer (1896–1968)

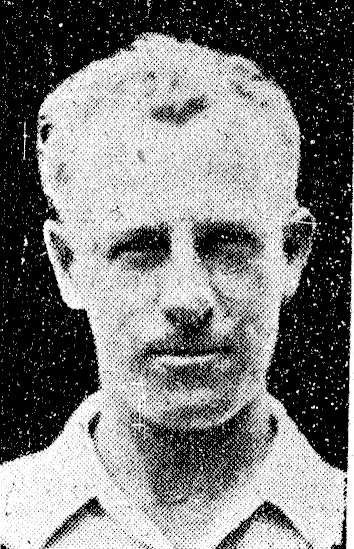

Personal information
- Full name: Ivan Walter Cooper
- Born: 28 January 1896; Auckland, New Zealand
- Died: 2 August 1968 (aged 72); Auckland, New Zealand
- Batting: Right-handed
- Bowling: Right-arm leg-spin

Domestic team information
- Years: Team
- 1924/25–1927/28: Auckland

Career statistics
Competition	First-class
Matches	13
Runs scored	580
Batting average	30.52
100s/50s	0/4
Top score	80
Balls bowled	970
Wickets	6
Bowling average	97.16
5 wickets in innings	0
10 wickets in match	0
Best bowling	1/18
Catches/stumpings	3/–
- Source: ESPNcricinfo, 7 September 2019

Ivan Walter Cooper (28 January 1896 – 2 August 1968) was a New Zealand cricketer. He played thirteen first-class matches for Auckland between 1925 and 1928.

Cooper was a batsman and occasional leg-spin bowler. His best performance in the Plunket Shield came against Canterbury in the 1927–28 season, when he scored 40 and 80 (the highest score on either side) and took a wicket. He was twelfth man for New Zealand in the unofficial Test in Auckland against Australia a few weeks later, but played no first-class cricket after that.

Cooper served overseas with the New Zealand Medical Corps in World War I. He worked in Auckland as a jeweller.
