= Luke Vivian =

New Zealand cricketer (born 1981)

Personal information
- Full name: Luke John Vivian
- Born: 12 June 1981 (age 45); Launceston, Tasmania, Australia
- Batting: Right-handed
- Bowling: Right-arm medium-fast
- Role: Batsman

Domestic team information
- Years: Team
- 2006/07: Canterbury
- 2008/09: Auckland
- LA debut: 23 December 2006 Canterbury v Otago
- Last LA: 31 January 2007 Canterbury v Northern Districts
- T20 debut: 10 November 2006 Canterbury v Auckland
- Last T20: 29 January 2007 Canterbury v Northern Districts

Career statistics
Competition	List A	Twenty20
Matches	6	8
Runs scored	57	143
Batting average	11.40	23.83
100s/50s	0/0	0/1
Top score	18*	55*
Catches/stumpings	2/–	4/–
- Source: CricInfo, 1 January 2025

Luke John Vivian (born 12 June 1981) is a New Zealand former cricketer who played Twenty20 and List A matches for Canterbury in the 2006–07 season and for Auckland in 2008–09. He played as a right-handed middle-order batsman. In the T20 match for Auckland against Central Districts in 2008–09 he made 55 not out off only 18 balls, with six sixes, to take Auckland to a six-wicket victory with seven balls to spare.
