= Lancelot Hemus =

New Zealand cricketer

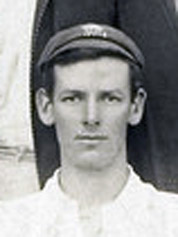
- Hemus in 1907

Personal information
- Full name: Lancelot Gerald Hemus
- Born: 13 November 1881; Auckland, New Zealand
- Died: 27 October 1933 (aged 51); Auckland, New Zealand
- Nickname: Chummy
- Batting: Right-handed

Domestic team information
- Years: Team
- 1904/05–1921/22: Auckland

Career statistics
Competition	First-class
Matches	46
Runs scored	2,916
Batting average	36.00
100s/50s	8/10
Top score	148
Balls bowled	310
Wickets	3
Bowling average	92.66
5 wickets in innings	0
10 wickets in match	0
Best bowling	1/4
Catches/stumpings	26/–
- Source: Cricinfo, 22 August 2018

Lancelot Gerald Hemus (13 November 1881 – 27 October 1933) was a New Zealand cricketer. He played 46 first-class matches for Auckland between 1904 and 1922.

An opening batsman, in 1907-08 Hemus scored the first century in the Plunket Shield when Auckland beat Canterbury to claim the Shield. By his last season, 1921–22, when Auckland again won the Shield, he was the highest scorer in the competition's history. When the cricket historian Tom Reese chose the best New Zealand team of all time in 1936, he named Hemus as one of the opening batsmen.

He died of pneumonia in 1933, leaving a widow, a son and three daughters.
