= James Hussey =

New Zealand cricketer

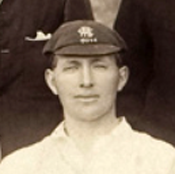
- James Hussey in 1907

Personal information
- Full name: James Michael Hussey
- Born: 27 May 1880; Dunedin, Otago, New Zealand
- Died: 24 August 1950 (aged 70); Wanganui, New Zealand
- Role: All-rounder

Domestic team information
- Years: Team
- 1901/02: Hawke's Bay
- 1902/03: Otago
- 1904/05–1907/08: Auckland

Career statistics
Competition	First-class
Matches	12
Runs scored	275
Batting average	15.27
100s/50s	0/1
Top score	74*
Balls bowled	1,130
Wickets	24
Bowling average	21.83
5 wickets in innings	0
10 wickets in match	0
Best bowling	4/27
Catches/stumpings	5/–
- Source: CricInfo, 6 March 2018

James Michael Hussey (27 May 1880 – 24 August 1950) was a New Zealand cricketer. He played first-class cricket for Auckland, Hawke's Bay and Otago between the 1901–02 season and 1907–08.

In Auckland's victory over Hawke's Bay in 1905–06 Hussey top-scored in each innings, making 74 not out and 40 not out. He played for Rangitikei and Wanganui in the Hawke Cup from 1911 to 1924, taking 7 for 24 in the second innings when Wanganui defeated South Auckland to take the trophy for the first time in December 1913.

Hussey worked for the Customs service until 1908 when he went to Wellington to enter the legal profession. He was admitted as a solicitor on 13 March 1908. He practised in Hunterville in the Rangitikei region before moving to Wanganui in 1912.

He died at home in Wanganui in August 1950, survived by his wife and their two sons and a daughter.
