= Grafton United Cricket Club =

New Zealand cricket club

Coordinates: 36.846129°S 174.754965°E

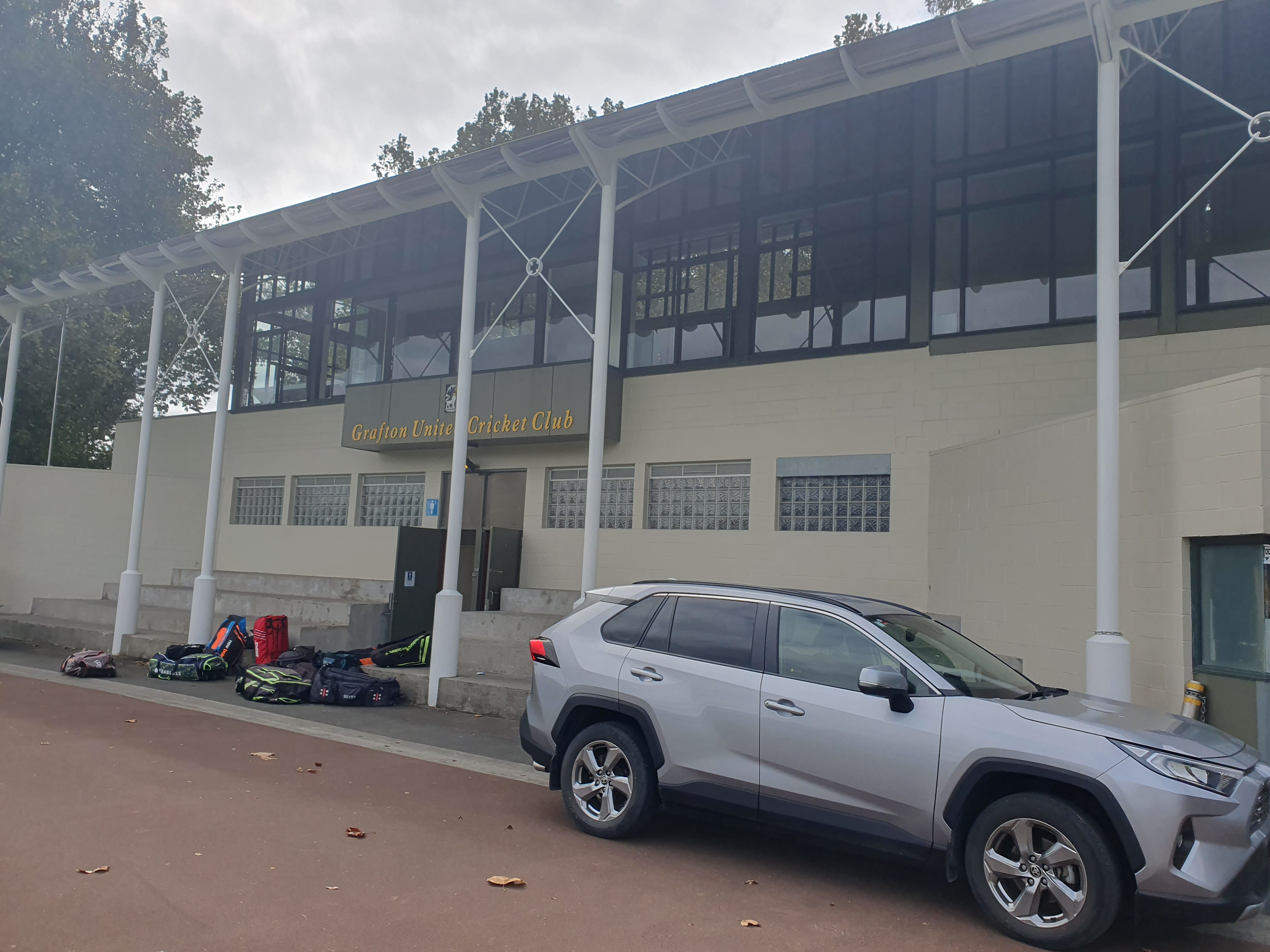
Grafton United Cricket Clubrooms in Victoria Park, New Zealand

Grafton United Cricket Club is one of New Zealand's oldest and largest cricket clubs, catering for around 700 senior members and 600 juniors (as of October 2017) from its clubrooms at Victoria Park, in central Auckland.

The club was founded as the United Cricket Club, on 18 September 1862 by players from existing Auckland clubs and was often referred to as 'the United' because of this. The club aimed to acquire more regular and more challenging competition than that which was on offer in Auckland at the time.

The club's first ground was a field in Newmarket donated by local farmer, James Dilworth, but its distance from the city prompted the administration, on behalf of the cricketers of Auckland, to apply for the use of the Auckland Domain and it began practicing and playing there in 1863.

When the Auckland Cricket Association's first District Scheme came into effect in 1903, the club became the Grafton District Cricket Club. It was so-named because, under the terms of the scheme, it was allocated the area surrounding the Auckland Domain to draw players from.

The Scheme was abandoned in 1920, at which time the club paired its original and district names to form Grafton United. This remained in place until the second District Scheme of 1952 when the club became Metropolitan District Cricket Club for three seasons and thereafter Grafton and Districts Cricket Club. The Scheme ended in 1967 and the club returned to the Grafton United name.

Victoria Park has been the club's home since the Auckland Cricket Association shifted clubs away from Eden Park in the early 1950s and, when the City Council leased the Campbell Free Kindergarten to it for a clubroom in 1960, it came to be thought of as Grafton's home ground exclusively. In partnership with the council, a new clubroom and indoor net facility were opened on the site of the old grandstand in 1993 and this continues to be the club's home.

The club celebrated its sesquicentenary in the 2012/13 season.
