= History of cricket in New Zealand from 1890–91 to 1918 =

This article describes the history of New Zealand cricket from the 1890–91 season until 1918.

== Administration ==
The New Zealand Cricket Council was formed at a meeting of provincial delegates from around New Zealand at the City Hotel in Christchurch on 27 December 1894. Its main purposes were to co-ordinate domestic cricket and to organize tours of New Zealand teams abroad and of foreign teams to New Zealand.

== Domestic cricket ==
There was no formal championship competition in New Zealand until the Plunket Shield was inaugurated in 1906. Until then, regular first-class matches were played by Canterbury, Otago, Auckland, Wellington, Hawke's Bay, Nelson (until 1891) and Taranaki (until 1898).

The 1906–07 season featured the inaugural Plunket Shield, which is still New Zealand's domestic first-class competition. The Plunket Shield was presented by the then governor-general, Lord Plunket, and was played on a challenge basis until 1920–21, since when it has been a league. In its early years it was always won by either Canterbury or Auckland.

=== Plunket Shield winners ===
- 1906–07 – Canterbury
- 1907–08 – Auckland
- 1908–09 – Auckland
- 1909–10 – Auckland
- 1910–11 – Auckland, Canterbury
- 1911–12 – Canterbury, Auckland
- 1912–13 – Auckland, Canterbury
- 1913–14 – Canterbury
- 1914–15 – Canterbury
- 1915–18 – no competition due to World War I

== International tours of New Zealand ==
=== New South Wales 1893–94 ===
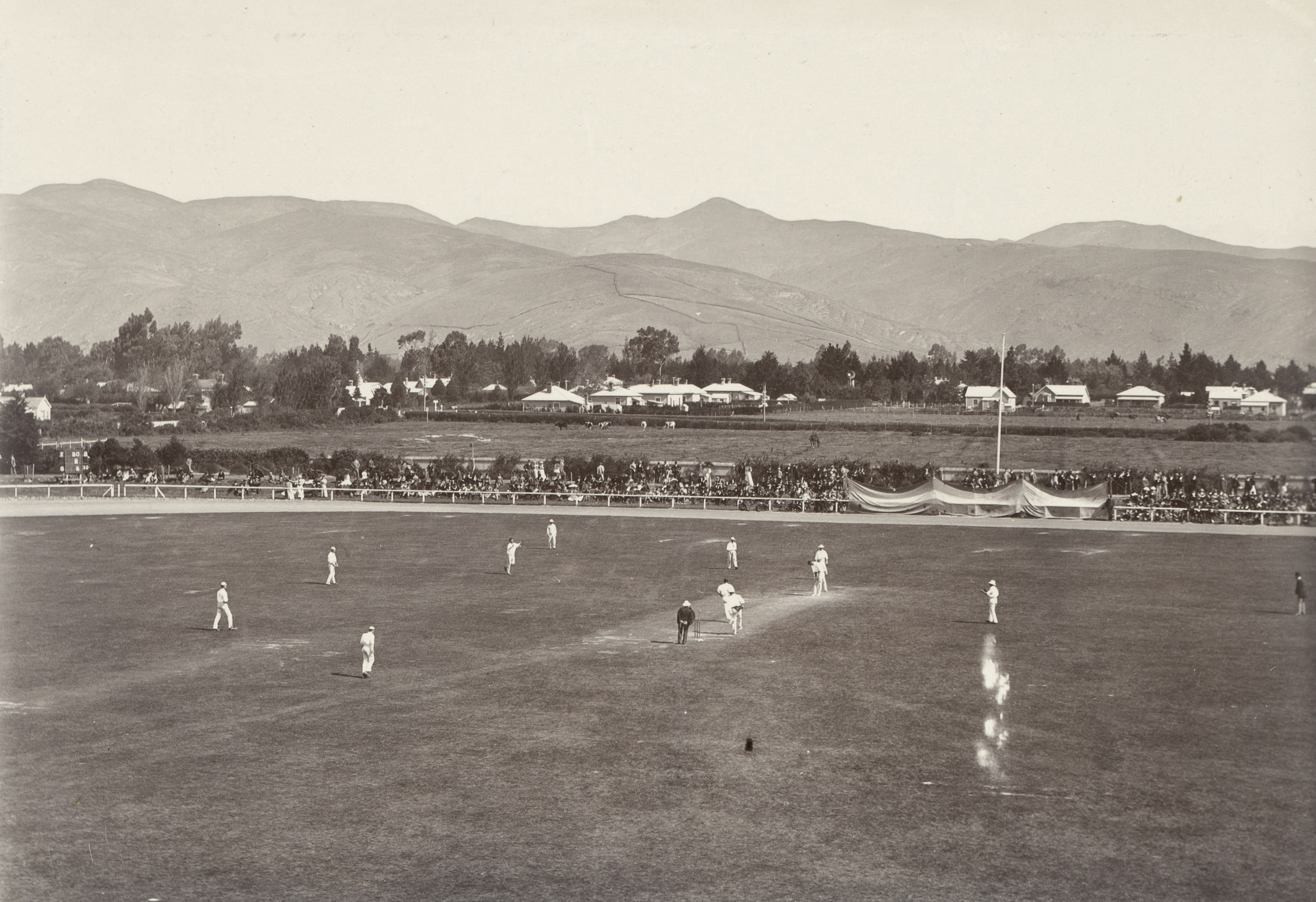
Sydney Austin (New South Wales) bowling out Leonard Cuff (New Zealand), Lancaster Park, Christchurch, 15 February 1894

New South Wales toured New Zealand in January and February 1894, playing seven first-class matches. The match in Christchurch against New Zealand was the New Zealand national team's first first-class match; New South Wales won.

See: New South Wales cricket team in New Zealand in 1893-94

=== Fiji 1894–95 ===
Fiji toured New Zealand in January and February 1895, playing matches against eight provincial sides. Six of these matches are now regarded as first-class.

=== New South Wales 1895–96 ===
New South Wales toured New Zealand in December 1895 and January 1896, playing five first-class matches. They again played New Zealand in Christchurch; this time New Zealand won.

=== Australia 1896–97 ===
Australia toured New Zealand in November 1896, playing five matches. All their matches were against teams of more than 11 players, so they are not regarded as first-class. Australia won the match against a New Zealand XV.

See: Australian cricket team in New Zealand in 1896–97

=== Queensland 1896–97 ===
Queensland toured New Zealand in December 1896 and January 1897, playing five first-class matches, including one against New Zealand, which New Zealand won.

=== Lord Hawke's XI 1902–03 ===
An English team managed by Lord Hawke played the New Zealand national team (twice) and the main provincial teams: Auckland, Wellington, Canterbury and Otago.

The MCC team was captained by Plum Warner and included Bernard Bosanquet, Frederick Fane, Cuthbert Burnup and George Thompson.

See: Lord Hawke's cricket team in Australia and New Zealand in 1902–03

=== Australia 1904–05 ===
Australia toured New Zealand in the 1904–05 season to play first-class matches against the New Zealand national team (twice), Canterbury and Otago.

See: Australian cricket team in New Zealand and Fiji in 1904–05

=== Marylebone Cricket Club 1906–07 ===
MCC played two first-class matches against New Zealand and also played two first-class matches against each of the four main provincial teams, Auckland, Wellington, Canterbury and Otago, and one first-class match against Hawke's Bay.

The MCC team was captained by Teddy Wynyard and included future Test players like Johnny Douglas and George Simpson-Hayward.

See: Marylebone Cricket Club cricket team in New Zealand in 1906–07

=== Australia 1909–10 ===
Australia played first-class matches against the New Zealand national team (twice), Auckland, Wellington, Canterbury, Otago and Hawke's Bay.

See: Australian cricket team in New Zealand in 1909–10

=== Australia 1913–14 ===
Australia played two first-class matches against New Zealand, first-class matches against Auckland, Wellington, Canterbury and Otago, and three minor matches.

See: Australian cricket team in New Zealand in 1913–14

== Leading players ==
When the cricket historian Tom Reese compiled his history of early New Zealand cricket, New Zealand Cricket, 1841–1914, in 1927, he selected a 14-man team of the best New Zealand cricketers of the period from 1860 to 1914. His idea was that the team would be a touring team to England or elsewhere.

- David Ashby
- William Barton
- James Baker
- Charles Boxshall
- Frank Cooke
- Herbert De Maus
- Alexander Downes
- Arthur Fisher
- Charlie Frith
- Lancelot Hemus
- Robert Neill
- Dan Reese
- Ernest Upham
- Arnold Williams

Reese added that De Maus had obtained the last batting spot just ahead of Len Cuff, Alfred Holdship and Kinder Tucker. He did not consider for selection those who had established reputations in Australia before they moved to New Zealand, such as Syd Callaway, Alfred Clarke, Harry Graham and Charles Richardson.

== See also ==
- History of cricket in New Zealand
