= English cricket team in Australia in 1903–04 =

International cricket tour

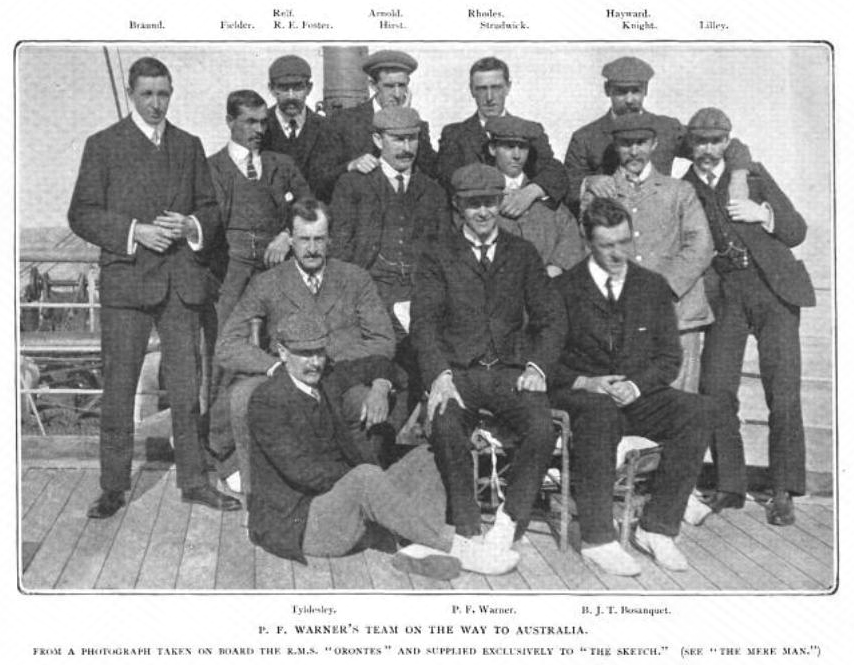
En route to Australia aboard RMS Orontes

The English cricket team's tour to Australia in 1903–04 was the first time the Marylebone Cricket Club (MCC) took over responsibility for sponsoring and arranging an overseas tour representing England. England had not won the Ashes since the 1896 series in England. The MCC appointed Plum Warner to put together and captain a team, which was very much seen as the underdogs against Australia. Warner and his team, however, pulled off the upset the English were looking for and won the five-Test series 3–2. In the first Test at Sydney, R.E. "Tip" Foster scored 287 to set the world record for the highest individual Test innings; the innings remains the highest by a Test debutant.

== Test series ==
=== First Test ===
11–17 December 1903
(Timeless Test)
Scorecard

Australia	v	England
285 (118.2 overs); MA Noble 133; EG Arnold 4/76 (32 overs)		577 (181.2 overs); RE Foster 287; MA Noble 3/99 (34 overs)
485 (145.2 overs); VT Trumper 185*; W Rhodes 5/94 (40.2 overs)		194/5 (95.5 overs); TW Hayward 91; WP Howell 2/35 (31 overs)

England won by 5 wickets
Sydney Cricket Ground, Sydney
Umpires: RM Crockett and AC Jones

- Australia won the toss and elected to bat.
- 13 December was taken as a rest day
- EG Arnold, RE Foster, BJT Bosanquet and AE Relf (all ENG) made their Test debuts.

=== Second Test ===
1–5 January 1904
(Timeless Test)
Scorecard

England	v	Australia
315 (152.5 overs); JT Tyldesley 97; WP Howell 4/43 (34.5 overs)		122 (30.2 overs); VT Trumper 74; W Rhodes 7/56 (15.2 overs)
103 (28.5 overs); JT Tyldesley 62; H Trumble 5/34 (10.5 overs)		111 (29.4 overs); VT Trumper 35; W Rhodes 8/68 (15 overs)

England won by 185 runs
Melbourne Cricket Ground, Melbourne
Umpires: P Argall and RM Crockett

- England won the toss and elected to bat.
- 3 January was taken as a rest day
- AE Knight and A Fielder (both ENG) made their Test debuts.

=== Third Test ===
15–20 January 1904
(Timeless Test)
Scorecard

Australia	v	England
388 (106.1 overs); VT Trumper 113; EG Arnold 3/93 (27 overs)		245 (102 overs); GH Hirst 58; H Trumble 3/49 (28 overs)
351 (114.5 overs); SE Gregory 112; BJT Bosanquet 4/73 (15.5 overs)		278 (117.1 overs); PF Warner 79; AJY Hopkins 4/81 (28.1 overs)

Australia won by 216 runs
Adelaide Oval, Adelaide
Umpires: P Argall and RM Crockett

- Australia won the toss and elected to bat.
- 17 January was taken as a rest day

=== Fourth Test ===
26 February – 3 March 1904
(Timeless Test)
Scorecard

England	v	Australia
249 (114.1 overs); AE Knight 70*; MA Noble 7/100 (41.1 overs)		131 (51.3 overs); RA Duff 47; EG Arnold 4/28 (14.3 overs)
210 (99.3 overs); TW Hayward 52; A Cotter 3/41 (18.3 overs)		171 (72.5 overs); MA Noble 53*; BJT Bosanquet 6/51 (15 overs)

England won by 157 runs
Sydney Cricket Ground, Sydney
Umpires: P Argall and RM Crockett

- England won the toss and elected to bat.
- 28 February was taken as a rest day.
- There was no play on the third day
- PA McAlister and A Cotter (both AUS) made their Test debuts.

=== Fifth Test ===
5–8 March 1904
(Timeless Test)
Scorecard

Australia	v	England
247 (82.1 overs); VT Trumper 88; LC Braund 8/81 (29.1 overs)		61 (31.2 overs); RE Foster 18; A Cotter 6/40 (15.2 overs)
133 (43.5 overs); RA Duff 31; GH Hirst 5/48 (16.5 overs)		101 (22.5 overs); RE Foster 30; H Trumble 7/28 (6.5 overs)

Australia won by 218 runs
Melbourne Cricket Ground, Melbourne
Umpires: P Argall and RM Crockett

- Australia won the toss and elected to bat.
- 6 March was taken as a rest day
- DRA Gehrs (AUS) made his Test debut.

== Tour matches ==
=== South Australia v M.C.C. ===
7–11 November 1903 (4-day match)
Scorecard

MCC	v	South Australia
483/8d (182 overs); TW Hayward 157; N Claxton 4/76 (26 overs)		172 (72 overs); DRA Gehrs 31; EG Arnold 3/49 (20 overs)
		343/7 (f/o) (140 overs); C Hill 116; AE Relf 3/48 (27 overs)

Match drawn
Adelaide Oval, Adelaide
Umpires: P Argall and GE Downs

- MCC won the toss and elected to bat.
- 8 November was taken as a rest day
- Total attendance was about 19,000.

=== Victoria v M.C.C. ===
13–16 November 1903 (4-day match)
Scorecard

Victoria	v	MCC
162 (86.2 overs); JE Monfries 41*; W Rhodes 5/26 (20.2 overs)		443/8d (143 overs); GH Hirst 92; FJ Laver 3/76 (21 overs)
210 (111.4 overs); W Bruce 51; A Fielder 3/35 (23 overs)

MCC won by an innings and 71 runs
Melbourne Cricket Ground, Melbourne
Umpires: E Barrass and RM Crockett

- Victoria won the toss and elected to field.
- 15 November was taken as a rest day
- The match was scheduled for four days but was completed in three.
- Total attendance was about 23,500.

=== New South Wales v M.C.C. ===
20–23 November 1903
Scorecard

New South Wales	v	MCC
108 (37.2 overs); VT Trumper 46; W Rhodes 6/55 (17 overs)		319 (137.4 overs); JT Tyldesley 80; A McBeath 3/72 (37.4 overs)
201 (74.4 overs); RA Duff 44; BJT Bosanquet 4/60 (19 overs)

MCC won by an innings and 10 runs
Sydney Cricket Ground, Sydney
Umpires: R Callaway and AC Jones

- MCC won the toss and elected to field.
- 22 November was taken as a rest day
- The match was scheduled for four days but was completed in three.
- Total attendance was 40,589.

=== Queensland v M.C.C. ===
27–30 November 1903
Scorecard

Queensland	v	MCC
242 (97.1 overs); WT Evans 72; EG Arnold 3/38 (23.1 overs)		215 (53 overs); AE Knight 46; T Byrne 5/74 (24 overs)
91 (48.4 overs); WT Evans 27; LC Braund 5/50 (19 overs)		119/4 (33 overs); RE Foster 34*; HB Griffith 3/34 (12 overs)

MCC won by 6 wickets
Brisbane Cricket Ground, Woolloongabba, Brisbane
Umpires: T Muir and JP Orr

- Queensland won the toss and elected to bat.
- 29 November was taken as a rest day.
- Total attendance was about 19,000.

=== Northern District XVIII v M.C.C. ===
2, 3 December 1903 (2-day match)
scorecard

Northern Districts XVIII; 283 (86.1 overs) & 241/6 (53.3 overs)	v	MCC; 453

Match drawn
Albion Ground, West Maitland, New South Wales

=== Newcastle XV v M.C.C. ===
4, 5 December 1903 (2-day match)
scorecard

MCC; 306 (76 overs) & 381/8 (82 overs)	v	Newcastle, XV; 203 (80 overs)

Match drawn
Number 1 Sports Ground, Newcastle, New South Wales

=== Melbourne Colts XVIII v M.C.C. ===
19, 21, 22 December 1903 (3-day match)
scorecard

MCC; 416 (121 overs)	v	Melbourne Juniors XVIII; 124 (67.5 overs) & 193 (f/o) (77.5 overs)

MCC won by an innings and 99 runs
Melbourne Cricket Ground, Melbourne

=== Bendigo and District XVIII v M.C.C. ===
26, 28 December 1903 (2-day match)
scorecard

Bendigo XVIII; 94 (46.4 overs) & 64/7 (28.4 overs)	v	MCC; 273/5d

Match drawn
Upper Reserve, Bendigo, Victoria

=== Ballarat XVIII v M.C.C. ===
8, 9 January 1904 (2-day match)
scorecard

MCC XVII; 326 (104 overs) & 226 (55 overs)	v	Ballarat XVIII; 197 (72 overs)

Match drawn
Eastern Oval, Ballarat, Victoria

=== Tasmania v M.C.C. ===
25–26 January 1904 (2-day match)
Scorecard

MCC	v	Tasmania
185 (55.2 overs); RE Foster 43; CJ Eady 3/40 (22.2 overs)		191 (88.1 overs); OH Douglas 38; EG Arnold 4/44 (34 overs)
354/4d (73 overs); BJT Bosanquet 124*; EAC Windsor 3/96 (24 overs)		63/1 (17 overs); RJ Hawson37*; RE Foster 1/34 (7 overs)

Match drawn
TCA Ground, Hobart, Tasmania
Umpires: C McAllen and J Watt

- MCC won the toss and elected to bat.

=== Tasmania v M.C.C. ===
29–30 January 1904 (2-day match)
Scorecard

Tasmania	v	MCC
141 (48.2 overs); N Dodds 48; GH Hirst 5/37 (16.2 overs)		353 (77 overs); TW Hayward 134; EAC Windsor 4/106 (30 overs)
259/3 (103 overs); JH Savigny 164*; AE Knight 2/34 (12 overs)

Match drawn
NTCA Ground, Launceston, Tasmania
Umpires: W Lawrence and J Masterton

- Tasmania won the toss and elected to bat.
- Total attendance was about 5,000.

=== Victoria v M.C.C. ===
5–9 February 1904
Scorecard

Victoria	v	MCC
299 (117.3 overs); PA McAlister 139; W Rhodes 6/62 (30 overs)		248 (62.2 overs); TW Hayward 77; JV Saunders 3/39 (15 overs)
15 (12.1 overs); GHS Trott 9 W Rhodes 5/6 (6.1 overs)		68/2 (27 overs); TW Hayward 26; HJ Fry 1/24 (10 overs)

MCC won by 8 wickets
Melbourne Cricket Ground, Melbourne
Umpires: E Barrass and RM Crockett

- Victoria won the toss and elected to field.
- 7 February was taken as a rest day
- There was no play on the second day.
- Total attendance was about 6,100.

=== New South Wales v M.C.C. ===
12–15 February 1904
Scorecard

MCC	v	New South Wales
190 (52 overs); BJT Bosanquet 54; A Cotter 5/44 (14 overs)		232 (63.3 overs); AJY Hopkins 52; W Rhodes 3/50 (19 overs)
461 (120.1 overs); BJT Bosanquet 114; A Cotter 3/56 (11 overs)		141 (40.4 overs); AJY Hopkins 56; BJT Bosanquet 6/45 (9.4 overs)

MCC won by 278 runs
Sydney Cricket Ground, Sydney
Umpires: WG Curran and JJ Giltinan

- MCC won the toss and elected to bat.
- 14 February was taken as a rest day.
- The match was scheduled for four days but completed in three.
- Total attendance was 28,296.

=== Western District XV v M.C.C. ===
19, 20 February 1904 (2-day match)
scorecard

Bathurst XV; 248 (74.4 overs) & 151/3d	v	MCC XVII; 176 & 115/5

Match drawn
Sports Ground, Bathurst, New South Wales

=== South Australia v M.C.C. ===
12–15 March 1904 (timeless match)
Scorecard

South Australia	v	MCC
259 (77.2 overs); DGA Gehrs 63; BJT Bosanquet 3/70 (17 overs)		154 (69.4 overs); PF Warner 50; N Claxton 5/56 (27 overs)
77 (29.4 overs); DGA Gehrs 30; LC Braund 8/43 (14.4 overs)		184/1 (36.3 overs); RE Foster 73*; N Claxton 1/58 (12 overs)

MCC won by 9 wickets
Adelaide Oval, Adelaide
Umpires: P Argall and GA Watson

- South Australia won the toss and elected to bat.
- 13 March was taken as a rest day.
- Total attendance was about 7,500.
