= New Zealand cricket team in Australia in 1898–99 =

International cricket tour

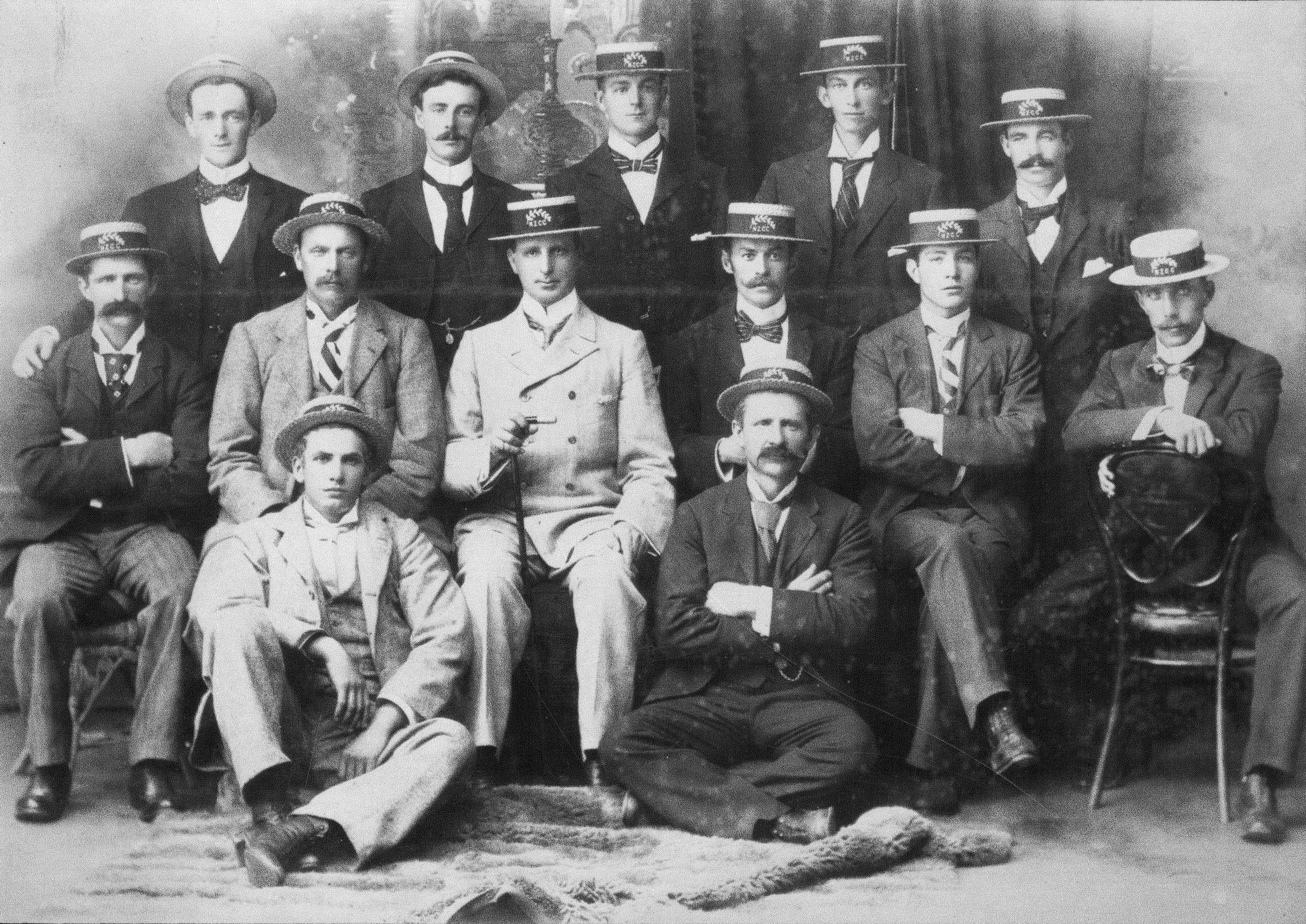
The New Zealand cricket team that toured Australia in 1898-99.

The New Zealand cricket team toured Australia in February 1899, playing two first-class matches against state teams and two other matches. It was New Zealand's first overseas tour.

== The team ==
Alfred Holdship, who probably would have captained the team, George Burnes, Wally Pearce, Charles Richardson and Arnold Williams were selected but were unable to make the trip. Alfred Clarke, a former Australian player, was selected, but the New Zealand Cricket Council vetoed his participation on "moral" grounds.

The team that eventually toured was:

- Thomas Cobcroft (captain)
- Frank Ashbolt
- James Baker
- Charles Boxshall
- Alexander Downes
- Arthur Fisher
- Stanley Frankish
- Hugh Lusk
- George Mills
- Isaac Mills
- Dan Reese
- Arthur Sims
- Ernest Upham

== The matches ==
The first two matches, in Tasmania, were not first-class. The tourists drew an evenly matched game in Hobart against Southern Tasmania, and beat Northern Tasmania in Launceston by 150 runs.

In the match against Victoria at the Melbourne Cricket Ground the New Zealanders batted first and made 317, Reese top-scoring with 88. They then had Victoria 129 for 5 before a series of dropped catches and an innings of 224 by Percy McAlister, batting at number seven, took Victoria to a total of 602. In their second innings the New Zealanders could make only 153, to lose by an innings and 132 runs.

At the Sydney Cricket Ground against New South Wales the New Zealanders fared even worse. They were dismissed for 140 and took the first two New South Wales wickets cheaply, but again they dropped a series of catches, and Victor Trumper scored 253 in five and a half hours out of a New South Wales total of 588. New Zealand were then dismissed for 64, Tom McKibbin bowling unchanged through the innings to take 7 for 30.

Baker was the highest scorer in the two first-class matches with 109 runs at an average of 27.25. Downes was the top wicket-taker with six wickets at 38.33.

First match

6-7 February 1899
(2-day match)
Scorecard

New Zealand	v	Southern Tasmania
335 (110.2 overs); Hugh Lusk 91; Charles Eady 6/150 (53.2 overs)		343 (115 overs); Edgar Hawson 76; Dan Reese 4/58 (15 overs)
103/3 (39 overs); James Baker 51*; Charles Eady 3/47 (19 overs)

Match drawn
TCA Ground, Hobart

- Toss not known

Second match

10-13 February 1899
(3-day match)
Scorecard

New Zealand	v	Northern Tasmania
245 (77.5 overs); Hugh Lusk 83; Edward Windsor 3/61 (14 overs)		329 (104 overs); Edward Windsor 181; Ernest Upham 4/62 (29 overs)
285 (98 overs); James Baker 49; Henry Wilson 3/40 (16 overs)		51 (29 overs); Edward Windsor 22; Ernest Upham 6/26 (15 overs)

New Zealand won by 150 runs
NTCA Ground, Launceston

- Toss not known
- 12 February was a rest day

Third match

17-21 February 1899
(timeless match)
Scorecard

New Zealand	v	Victoria
317 (122.5 overs); Dan Reese 88; Alfred Murray 5/71 (24 overs)		602 (184 overs); Peter McAlister 224; Alexander Downes 4/127 (57 overs)
153 (75.5 overs); Thomas Cobcroft 59*; Frank Laver 3/50 (28 overs)

Victoria won by an innings and 132 runs
Melbourne Cricket Ground, Melbourne
Umpires: Bob Crockett and Herbert Fry

- New Zealand won the toss and decided to bat
- 19 February was a rest day

Fourth match

24-27 February 1899
(timeless match)
Scorecard

New Zealand	v	New South Wales
140 (62.1 overs); Ernest Upham 31*; Bill Howell 5/22 (18 overs)		588 (150.3 overs); Victor Trumper 253; Alexander Downes 2/103 (27.3 overs)
64 (34.2 overs); James Baker 17; Tom McKibbin 7/30 (17.2 overs)

New South Wales won by an innings and 384 runs
Sydney Cricket Ground, Sydney
Umpires: Charles Bannerman and John Thompson

- New Zealand won the toss and decided to bat
- 26 February was a rest day

== Other sources ==
- Don Neely & Richard Payne, Men in White: The History of New Zealand International Cricket, 1894–1985, Moa, Auckland, 1986, pp. 40–42.
- Dan Reese, Was It All Cricket?, George Allen & Unwin, London, 1948, pp. 35–55.
