= Australian cricket team in New Zealand in 1896–97 =

International cricket tour

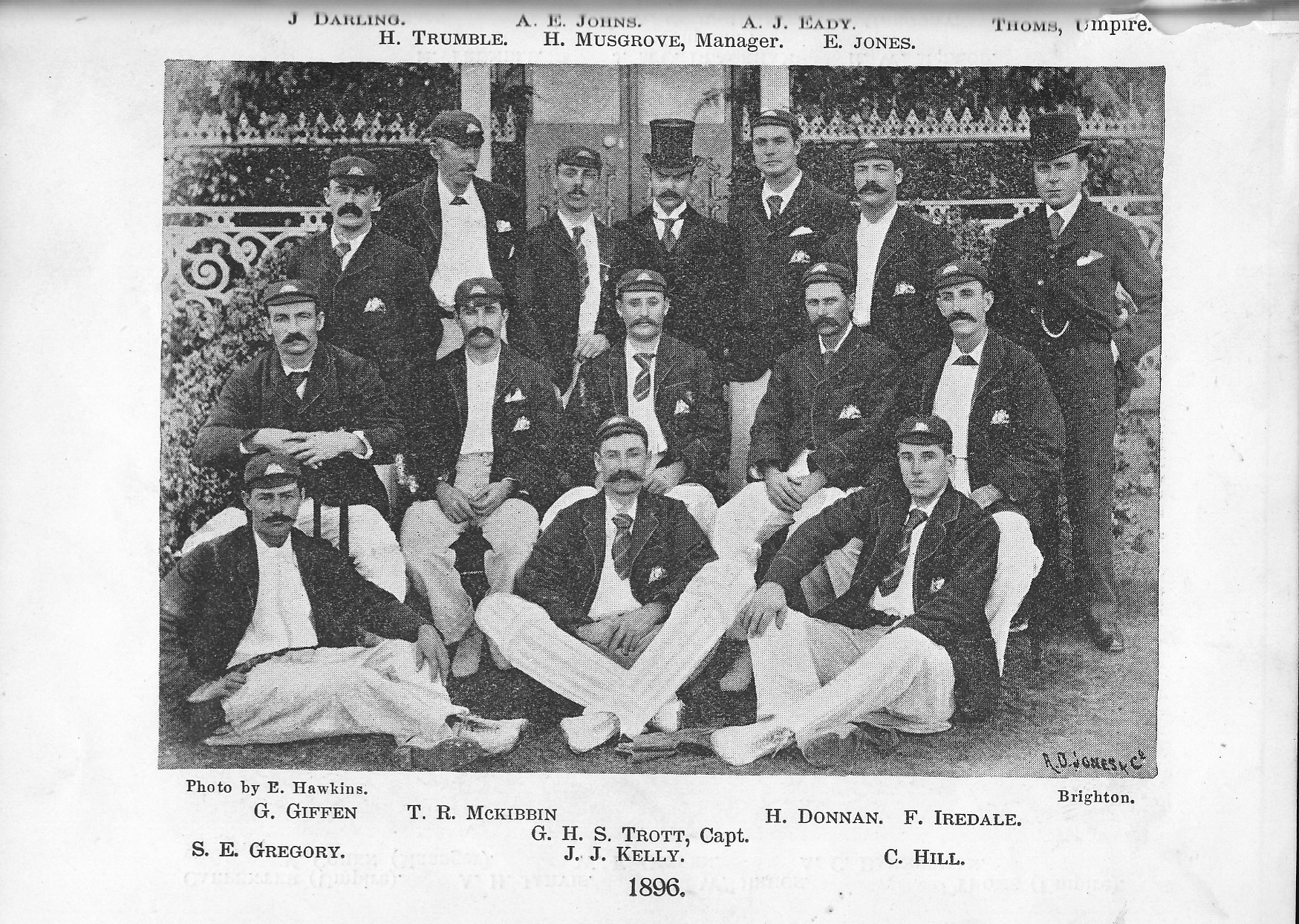
The 1896 Australian team

The Australian cricket team toured New Zealand in November 1896, playing five matches. They were returning from their 1896 tour of England.

It was Australia's fourth tour of New Zealand, after tours in 1877–78, 1880–81 and 1886–87. The Australians played four matches against provincial teams, three of which fielded 18 players (the other team, Otago, fielded 15). The final match of the tour was against a New Zealand 15. It was New Zealand's first international match, following the formation of the New Zealand Cricket Council in 1894. All previous Australian teams had played only against provincial sides.

The Australians defeated Southland, Otago and New Zealand, and drew against Auckland and Wellington. As none of the matches were 11-a-side they are not considered to have been first-class.

== The Australian team ==
- Harry Trott (captain)
- Joe Darling
- Charles Eady
- George Giffen
- Harry Graham
- Syd Gregory
- Clem Hill
- Frank Iredale
- Alfred Johns
- Ernie Jones
- James Kelly
- Tom McKibbin
- Hugh Trumble

Harry Donnan, the other member of the side that had toured England, did not play in New Zealand as he had to return to his employment in Sydney.

== The tour ==
The Australians arrived in Auckland on 5 November, after a three-week voyage from San Francisco on the Mariposa.

The Canterbury Cricket Association gave up the chance of a match against the Australians at Lancaster Park in order that New Zealand could play its first match against another national team. The only previous matches by New Zealand had been against touring New South Wales teams in 1893–94 and 1895–96. The Canterbury association agreed to accept 75 per cent of the profit from the match at Lancaster Park.

- Auckland v Australians, Auckland Domain, Auckland, 6, 7, 9 November 1896. Australians 162 and 233; Auckland XVIII 140 and 111 for 11. Drawn.

The only fifty in the match was Clem Hill's 51 in Australia's second innings. Isaac Mills, with 20 and 28, was Auckland's only batsman to reach 20. Robert Neill took 6 for 71 in Australia's first innings, and William Stemson took 5 for 49 in the second. For Australia, Hugh Trumble took 6 for 37 in Auckland's first innings, and Ernie Jones took 5 for 36 in the second.

The Australians had arrived only the day before the match and were still feeling the effects of their voyage.

- Wellington v Australians, Basin Reserve, Wellington, 12, 13, 15 November 1896. Australians 147 and 206; Wellington XVIII 124 and 108 for 14; Drawn.

Joe Darling scored the only fifty, making 59 and 37. Frank Holdsworth was Wellington's top scorer with 30 in the first innings. Alfred Holdship took 5 for 28 in Australia's first innings. For Australia, Giffen took 7 for 38 in the first innings and Trott 9 for 54 in the second.

The match went ahead despite severe vandalism to the pitch a few days earlier. The takings were £255, which gave the local association about £50 in profit.

- Southland v Australians, Queens Park, Invercargill, 18, 19 November 1896. Southland XVIII 42 and 67; Australians 178. Australians won by an innings and 69 runs.

Trumble took 10 for 13 in the first innings, and Trott took 11 for 38 in the second. Kelly was the top-scorer in the match with 36; Southland's only player to reach double-figures was the captain, George Burnes, who made 18 in the second innings.

Rain on preceding days had dampened the ground, and the match was played on matting laid down over the pitch. The match concluded early on the second day, after which the Australians had a second innings to entertain the crowd, scoring 220 runs for six wickets in 90 minutes.

- Otago v Australians, Carisbrook, Dunedin, 21, 23, 24 November 1896. Australians 130 and 95; Otago XV 144 and 64. Australians won by 17 runs.

Although they fielded the smallest side of the provinces, Otago provided the closest match. After leading on the first innings they needed only 82 to win, but were dismissed for 64 by Trumble, who took 9 for 30. The Otago number 12, Ralph Spraggon, made the highest score on either side with 36 in the first innings. Otago's opening bowler Arthur Fisher was their outstanding player, with 6 for 39 and 5 for 39.

The match takings were £303. Fisher so impressed the Australians that he was invited to go to Australia to play there and qualify for the Australian Test team. He spent some time playing in Melbourne in the 1897–98 season, but with little success, and returned to New Zealand.

- New Zealand v Australia, Lancaster Park, Christchurch, 26, 27, 28 November 1896. Australia 304 and 73 for 4; New Zealand XV 129 and 247. Australia won by six wickets.

Ernie Jones "bowled at a pace quite foreign to the local batsmen" and took 8 for 64 and 5 for 58. New Zealand's second innings included the first two fifties scored by any New Zealand batsmen against the four Australian touring teams: Len Cuff made 50 and Arnold Williams made 73. Their resistance gave Australia a fourth-innings target of 73 runs in the last hour of the match. The scores were tied at the scheduled time for stumps, but Cuff, the New Zealand captain, "generously signalled to the umpire for another over", which allowed Australia to score the required run.

Almost 10,000 spectators watched the match. Match takings were £550. Shortly after play ended on the third day, the Australians left for Australia on the Rotomahana.

== Aftermath and assessments ==
The Australians' top run-scorer was Darling, with 222 runs at an average of 23.55. Kelly topped the averages with 143 runs at 28.60. Iredale's 75 in the match against New Zealand was the highest score for any side in all of the matches. The leading bowler was Trumble, with 34 wickets at an average of 6.29, while McKibbin, Jones and Trott each took 26 or 27 wickets and averaged between 7 and 9.

The Australians received £811 as their share of the tour's profits. At its meeting immediately after the tour, the New Zealand Cricket Council resolved to ask the Marylebone Cricket Club to rule on the legality of the extension of time after the scheduled close of play, as occurred in the New Zealand–Australia match.
