= George Mills (cricketer, born 1867) =

New Zealand cricketer

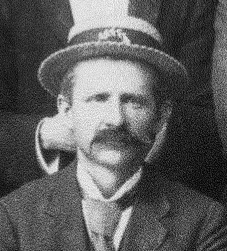
- Mills in 1898/99

Personal information
- Born: 23 March 1867; Dartford, Kent, England
- Died: 13 March 1942 (aged 74); Auckland, New Zealand
- Batting: Right-handed
- Bowling: Right-arm slow
- Role: Batting all-rounder
- Relatives: John Mills (son); Edward Mills (brother); Isaac Mills (brother); William Mills (brother)

Domestic team information
- Years: Team
- 1886/87: Auckland
- 1894/95: Hawke's Bay
- 1900/01–1902/03: Otago

Career statistics
Competition	First-class
Matches	17
Runs scored	551
Batting average	22.04
100s/50s	1/2
Top score	106*
Balls bowled	1,041
Wickets	26
Bowling average	11.76
5 wickets in innings	3
10 wickets in match	1
Best bowling	7/36
Catches/stumpings	11/–
- Source: CricInfo, 6 April 2019

George Mills (23 March 1867 – 13 March 1942) was an English-born cricketer. He played first-class cricket in New Zealand for Auckland, Hawke's Bay and Otago between the 1886–87 and 1902–03 seasons.

== Life and career ==
Mills was born at Dartford in Kent in 1867 before his family emigrated from England to New Zealand in 1873, sailing on the Berar. George Mills was one of Auckland's leading players in the 1890s. His brothers Edward, Isaac and William also played for Auckland.

Mills had a spectacular first-class debut in 1886–87 against Wellington, bowling unchanged through both innings and taking 7 for 36 and 3 for 34, as well as scoring 39 not out at number 11 in an innings victory. His bowling later fell away and he bowled little later in his career. He spent a few years in Melbourne, where he played senior cricket for Essendon from 1889 to 1892.

Returning to New Zealand, Mills scored Auckland's first first-class century when he made 106 against Wellington in 1895–96; nobody else in the match made more than 51, and Auckland won by four wickets. He also made the match top score, 80, against Canterbury in 1897–98. Along with his brother Isaac, he toured Australia in 1898–99 in New Zealand's first overseas touring team.

He married Louisa Carruthers in Melbourne in 1891. They had two daughters and two sons, one of whom, Jack, played Test cricket for New Zealand in the 1930s. George spent 45 years as a groundsman, including spells at Essendon and at Carisbrook in Dunedin. For 30 years he was in charge of the Eden Park ground in Auckland, which he transformed from a stony paddock into a first-class cricket ground in 1914 and a Test ground in 1930.

Mills died at Auckland in 1942 at the age of 74. An obituary was published in the 1943 edition of Wisden Cricketers' Almanack.
