= Norman Claxton =

Australian sportsman

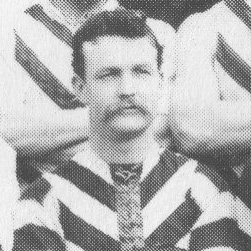

Personal information
- Full name: Norman Claxton
- Nickname: Norrie
- Born: 2 November 1877 North Adelaide, South Australia, Australia
- Died: 5 December 1951 (aged 74) North Adelaide, South Australia, Australia
Australian rules football career
Personal information
- Position: Defender
Playing career
Years	Club	Games (Goals)
1900–1904	North Adelaide	38 (2)
Career highlights
- 2x SAFA premiership player: 1900, 1902; North Adelaide best and fairest: 1902

Sport
- Cricket career

Cricket information
- Batting: Right-handed
- Bowling: Right-arm fast-medium
- Role: All-rounder

Domestic team information
- Years: Team
- 1898/99–1909/10: South Australia

Career statistics
Competition	First-class
Matches	39
Runs scored	2090
Batting average	29.43
100s/50s	1/14
Top score	199*
Balls bowled	4521
Wickets	66
Bowling average	34.42
5 wickets in innings	3
10 wickets in match	0
Best bowling	5/56
Catches/stumpings	26/–
- Source: ESPNcricinfo, 11 October 2023

Norman Claxton (2 November 1877 – 5 December 1951) was an all-round sportsman from South Australia. He was a prominent figure in South Australian cricket, Australian rules football, baseball, and cycling during the early twentieth century, both as a player and later an administrator.

He represented South Australia in first-class cricket, playing 39 matches for his state, and finishing his career with 2,090 first-class runs at an average of 29.43. In Australian rules football, he was part of the North Adelaide Football Club teams that won the South Australian National Football League in 1900 and 1902. He left a lasting legacy in baseball by donating the Claxton Shield which bears his name as the trophy for the champion baseball team in Australia. His contributions to baseball led to him being inducted into the Baseball Australia Hall of Fame in 2005.

== Personal and business life ==
Claxton was born in North Adelaide, South Australia on 2 November 1877. He was the son of William Denton Claxton and Hannah (née Parr) Claxton. He had a half-brother, William Claxton, who was twenty years his senior and who also played first-class cricket. He entered the Adelaide stock exchange in 1910, and had various business interests. He died on 5 December 1951, having never married. He was survived by two sisters.

== Cricket career ==
Claxton made his first-class cricket debut in April 1899, playing for South Australia against Western Australia. He bowled three overs without taking a wicket, and scored no runs in the match; being bowled out for a duck in both innings. He had more success in 1902, scoring 61 and 83 for South Australia against the touring England team. He claimed five wickets in an innings on three occasions, during three subsequent appearances. He first achieved the feat in 1903 against New South Wales. In the first innings, Claxton took five wickets, and conceded 129 runs (styled 5/129) during his 36 overs. He repeated the achievement in the next match, claiming 5/56 against the touring English cricket team – the best figures of his career. His next appearance was not until the start of the 1904–05 season, when he claimed 5/130 against Victoria.

His best season as a batsman was in 1905–06, when he scored 401 runs at an average of 36.45. He made his highest first-class score during that season, in a match against Victoria. After scoring 67 runs out of South Australia's first innings total of 181, Claxton accumulated 199 runs in the second, carrying his bat in the process. South Australia won the match by 120 runs. It was the only century of Claxton's first-class career. He captained South Australia in five Sheffield Shield matches, first doing so against Victoria in 1906. He made his final first-class appearance in December 1909, being dismissed for a duck during his only innings. Described in his Australian Dictionary of Biography entry as an elegant right-handed batsman, Claxton scored a total of 2,090 first-class runs between 1899 and 1909, at an average of 29.43. He also bowled, alebit without much success at state level, as a right-arm fast-medium, and claimed 66 wickets at a bowling average of 34.42.

After his retirement from playing first-class cricket, Claxton became an administrator for South Australia, acting as a selector between 1902 and 1905, and again from 1907 until 1909. He was the team manager for a time in 1913, and sat on the state association's committee for twenty years.

== Other sports ==
Aside from cricket, Claxton enjoyed a number of sports. He represented North Adelaide in both baseball and Australian rules football. He was a member of the North Adelaide Football Club teams that won the South Australian Football Association in 1900 and 1902, for whom he played as a half-back. He later became the founding president of the South Australian Baseball League between 1913 and 1929. In 1934, he established a tournament intended to promote regular contests between state baseball teams. The trophy, which he donated, is still awarded to the champions of the premier baseball competition in Australia. Despite his request that the shield should not bear his name, it became known as the Claxton Shield. He was an inaugural inductee into the Baseball Australia Hall of Fame in 2005. Before he turned 30, he had also enjoyed success in both athletics and hockey. He was also a prominent cyclist, and captained the North Adelaide Cycling Club from 1917 until his death.

== See also ==
- List of South Australian representative cricketers
