= Albert Geddes =

New Zealand cricketer

Personal information
- Full name: Albert Edward Geddes
- Born: 22 August 1871; Melbourne, Australia
- Died: 12 August 1935 (aged 63); Dunedin, New Zealand
- Batting: Left-handed
- Bowling: Slow left-arm orthodox

Domestic team information
- Years: Team
- 1899/1900–1903/04: Otago

Career statistics
| Competition | First-class |
|---|---|
| Matches | 9 |
| Runs scored | 266 |
| Batting average | 19.00 |
| 100s/50s | 0/1 |
| Top score | 77 |
| Balls bowled | 296 |
| Wickets | 7 |
| Bowling average | 18.71 |
| 5 wickets in innings | 0 |
| 10 wickets in match | 0 |
| Best bowling | 3/5 |
| Catches/stumpings | 12/0 |
- Source: ESPNcricinfo, 6 May 2020

Albert Edward Geddes (22 August 1871 – 12 August 1935) was a New Zealand cricketer. He played nine first-class matches for Otago between 1899 and 1904.

== Life and career ==
Born in Melbourne, Geddes played cricket and Australian rules football in Victoria and Western Australia before moving to Dunedin in 1898. A left-handed batsman and left-arm spin bowler, he was also a respected captain in club cricket and for Otago.

Geddes' highest first-class score was 77 when he captained Otago to an innings victory over Hawke's Bay in 1901-02 and added 171 for the fourth wicket with James Baker. In Otago's narrow victory over Canterbury in January 1900, he was the highest scorer on either side with 41 not out in the second innings; he and Alec Downes took the score from 62 for 7 to 131 for 8, "completely altering the aspect of affairs".

His best first-class bowling figures were 3 for 5 and 2 for 12 on his first-class debut against Hawke's Bay in December 1899. He also took 6 for 14 for Otago against Southland in December 1898. In a senior Dunedin club match in February 1905 he took nine wickets in each innings for match figures of 18 for 79.

Geddes was also a rugby union player. He served as president of the Southland Rugby Football Union in the 1920s.

Geddes married Hettie Critchley in Dunedin in July 1903. He had a jewellery shop in Port Chalmers until 1907, when he moved to Winton in Southland and opened a jewellery shop there. He died suddenly at his home in Dunedin in August 1935, survived by his wife and their two sons.
