= International cricket in 1902–03 =

International cricket season

The 1902–03 international cricket season was from September 1902 to April 1903.

== Season overview ==
International tours
Start date	Home team	Away team	Results [Matches]			
Start date	Home team	Away team	Test	ODI	FC	LA
11 October 1902	South Africa	Australia	0–2 [3]	—	—	—
27 February 1903	New Zealand	England	—	—	0–2 [2]	—
13 March 1903	Australia	England	—	—	2–0 [3]	—

== October ==
=== Australia in South Africa ===
Test series
No.	Date	Home captain	Away captain	Venue	Result
Test 75	11–14 October	Henry Taberer	Joe Darling	Old Wanderers, Johannesburg	Match drawn
Test 76	18–21 October	Biddy Anderson	Joe Darling	Old Wanderers, Johannesburg	Australia by 159 runs
Test 77	8–11 November	Ernest Halliwell	Joe Darling	Newlands Cricket Ground, Cape Town	Australia by 10 wickets

== February ==
=== England in New Zealand ===
First-class series
No.	Date	Home captain	Away captain	Venue	Result
Match 1	27 Feb–2 March	Charles Richardson	Pelham Warner	AMI Stadium, Christchurch	Hawke's XI by 7 wickets
Match 2	4–6 March	Charles Richardson	Pelham Warner	Basin Reserve, Wellington	Hawke's XI by an innings and 22 runs

== March ==
=== England in Australia ===
First-class series
No.	Date	Home captain	Away captain	Venue	Result
Match 1	13–16 March	(Victoria (state)) Frank Laver	Pelham Warner	Melbourne Cricket Ground, Melbourne	Victoria by 7 wickets
Match 2	20–24 March	(New South Wales) Monty Noble	Pelham Warner	Sydney Cricket Ground, Sydney	Match drawn
Match 3	27–31 March	(South Australia) Clem Hill	Pelham Warner	Unley Oval, Adelaide	South Australia by 97 runs
