= William Claxton =

William Claxton is the name of:

- William Claxton (cricketer) (1857–1937), Australian cricketer
- William Claxton (photographer) (1927–2008), American photographer
- William Gordon Claxton (1899–1967), Canadian World War I ace pilot
- William F. Claxton (1914-1996), American film and television director
- Will Claxton (born 1981), American golfer

== See also ==
- William Caxton, printer
