= Stanley Frankish =

New Zealand cricketer

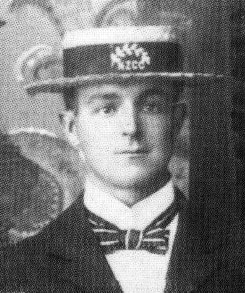

Personal information
- Full name: Frank Stanley Frankish
- Born: 2 November 1872; Christchurch, New Zealand
- Died: 30 May 1909 (aged 36); Wanganui, New Zealand
- Bowling: Left-arm fast-medium

Domestic team information
- Years: Team
- 1894-95 to 1903-04: Canterbury

Career statistics
Competition	First-class
Matches	18
Runs scored	278
Batting average	9.58
100s/50s	0/1
Top score	56
Balls bowled	4264
Wickets	94
Bowling average	18.28
5 wickets in innings	7
10 wickets in match	3
Best bowling	7/26
Catches/stumpings	16/–
- Source: Cricket Archive, 15 October 2014

Frank Stanley Frankish (2 November 1872 – 30 May 1909) was a cricketer who played first-class cricket for Canterbury from 1894 to 1903, and played for New Zealand in the days before New Zealand played Test cricket.

== Early life and career ==
Stanley Frankish was born in Christchurch and educated at Christ's College. He was "a splendid athlete, who could run 100 yards in a fraction over ten seconds". He was a tall left-arm fast-medium bowler "of the same style, and about the same pace, as George Hirst, but two years ahead of the Yorkshireman in developing his disconcerting off-swerve". He made his first-class debut for Canterbury in 1894–95.

== Playing for New Zealand ==
Frankish was selected to play for New Zealand in 1896–97, when he came into the side as a last-minute replacement for Arthur Fisher and took 3 for 49 and 5 for 51 in the victory over the touring Queensland team.

He toured Australia with the New Zealanders in 1898-99 but was unsuccessful, as was Fisher. One of their team-mates on the tour, Dan Reese, later wrote, "Fisher and Frankish ... were fine bowlers, but they just could not adapt themselves to the Australian conditions, and discovered that it needs more than beautiful, swinging deliveries to get wickets over there."

In two matches in December 1901 Frankish took 23 wickets for Canterbury. On 14 December, the opening day of the first match, he took 10 wickets for 26. He began the day by taking 7 for 26 to dismiss Wellington for 77. Canterbury made 171 in reply, and when Wellington had to bat again briefly that day Frankish clean bowled three batsmen for no runs in the first over, which still had one ball left when stumps were drawn. Canterbury won by three wickets. A few days later he took 4 for 40 and 6 for 77 against Otago, who nevertheless won by 122 runs. Frankish top-scored with 29 in Canterbury's first innings total of 67.

In 1902–03 he took 5 for 124 and 5 for 70 for Canterbury against Lord Hawke's XI. He took two wickets in New Zealand's first match against Lord Hawke's XI, but was unavailable for the second. Altogether in his six matches in the 1901–02 and 1902–03 seasons he took 48 wickets at an average of 12.64. Pelham Warner, who captained Lord Hawke's XI, judged Frankish to be "the best bowler in New Zealand, for he keeps a good length, being especially difficult to drive or force forward, and with a nice high action makes the ball swing a good deal with his arm. On all wickets I should consider him distinctly the best bowler we played against."

== Later career and illness ==
After his successful season in 1902–03, Frankish played only one more first-class match, against Otago in 1903–04, when he made his highest score of 56 and took six wickets in a victory for Canterbury. His health declined when he contracted tuberculosis. He moved to the North Island, and even travelled to the South Pacific islands in the hope that the warmer climate would help, but after some years of illness he died in Wanganui in 1909, aged 36.

Dan Reese wrote: "One speaks of a brilliant batsman, but seldom is this term applicable to a bowler, yet I think it could be used for Frankish. With a new ball he could at times, in a few sensational overs, break the back of a batting side. It is for these flashes of brilliance that he is best remembered."
