= Isaac Mills =

Isaac Mills may refer to:

- Isaac Mills (cricketer) (1869–1956), New Zealand cricketer
- Isaac N. Mills (1851–1929), American lawyer, judge, and politician from New York.
- Isaac Milles (1638–1720) or Mills, English cleric
