= Ashbolt =

Ashbolt is a surname. Notable people with the surname include:

- Allan Ashbolt (1921–2005), Australian journalist, producer, and broadcaster
- Frank Ashbolt (1876–1940), New Zealand cricketer
