= Isaac Mills (cricketer) =

New Zealand cricketer

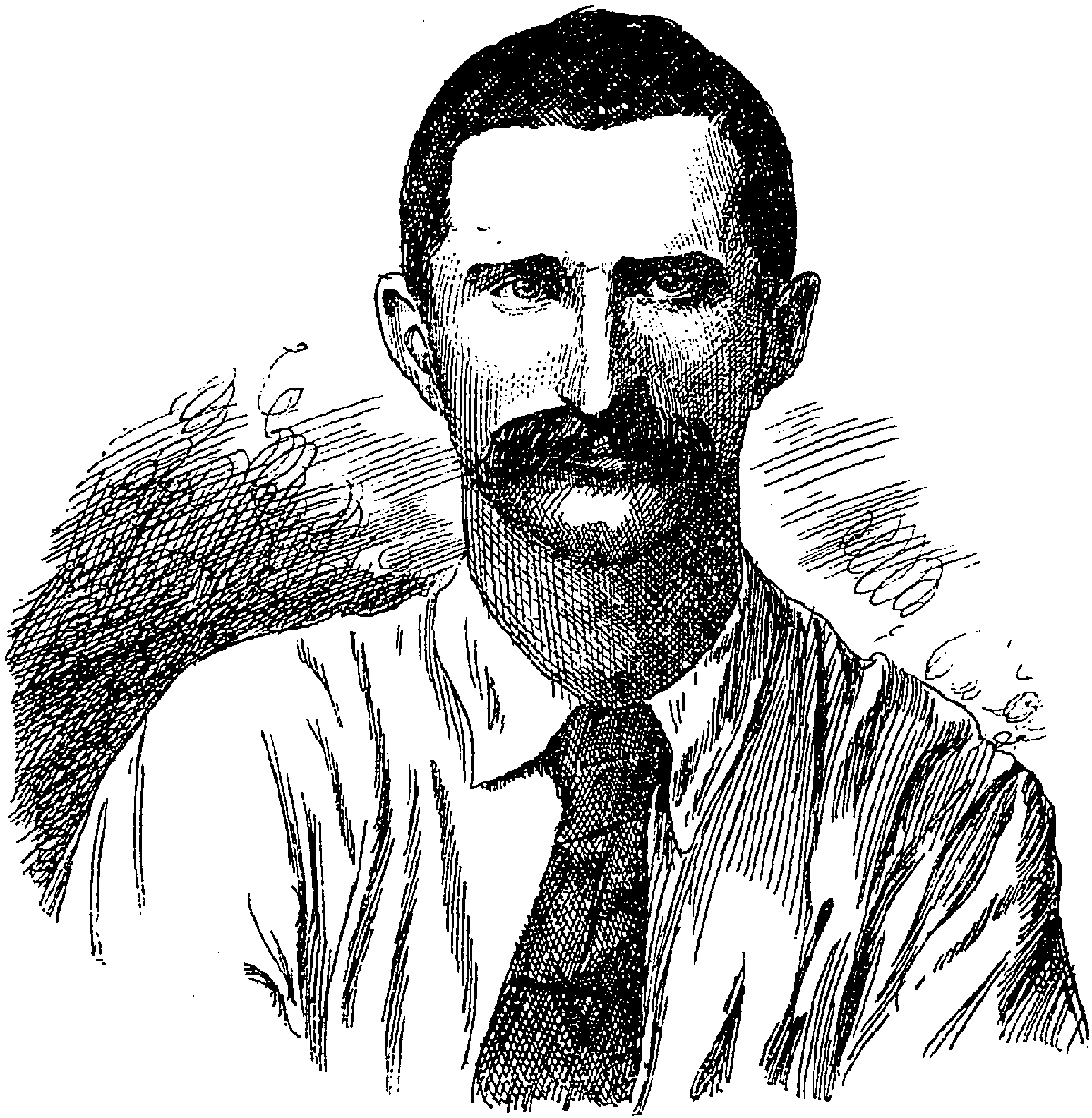
- Mills in 1894

Personal information
- Born: 5 April 1869; Dartford, Kent, England
- Died: 16 August 1956 (aged 87); Auckland, New Zealand
- Batting: Right-handed
- Relatives: Edward Mills (brother); George Mills (brother); John Mills (nephew)

Domestic team information
- Years: Team
- 1889/90–1903/04: Auckland

Career statistics
Competition	First-class
Matches	18
Runs scored	700
Batting average	23.33
100s/50s	0/3
Top score	88*
Balls bowled	316
Wickets	4
Bowling average	37.00
5 wickets in innings	0
10 wickets in match	0
Best bowling	2/17
Catches/stumpings	13/–
- Source: ESPNcricinfo, 6 April 2019

Isaac Mills (5 April 1869 – 16 August 1956) was a New Zealand cricketer who played first-class cricket for Auckland between 1890 and 1903 and represented New Zealand.

Mills's family migrated from England to New Zealand in 1873, sailing on the Berar. An opening batsman, Ike Mills was one of Auckland's leading players in the 1890s. His brothers Edward and George also played for Auckland.

Mills top-scored for Auckland in three consecutive matches in the 1893–94 season. In the second match, against Otago, he carried his bat for 88 not out in a team total of 156. He played in New Zealand's first representative match later that season, against the touring New South Wales team, opening the batting and facing the first delivery. However, he made only 5 and 3, and New Zealand lost by 160 runs.

Mills top-scored in each innings when Auckland played the touring Australians in November 1896, scoring 20 and 28, and was selected to play for New Zealand later that month, but he was unsuccessful in that match. He toured Australia in 1898-99 in New Zealand's first overseas touring team, scoring 31 and 19 in the match against Victoria.
