= Jeremiah Mahoney =

Jeremiah Mahoney may refer to:

- Jeremiah Mahoney (cricketer) (1880–1966), Australian cricket player
- Jeremiah Mahoney (Medal of Honor) (1840–1902), American soldier
- Jeremiah T. Mahoney (1878–1970), American judge
