= Frank Holdsworth =

New Zealand cricketer (1871–1941)

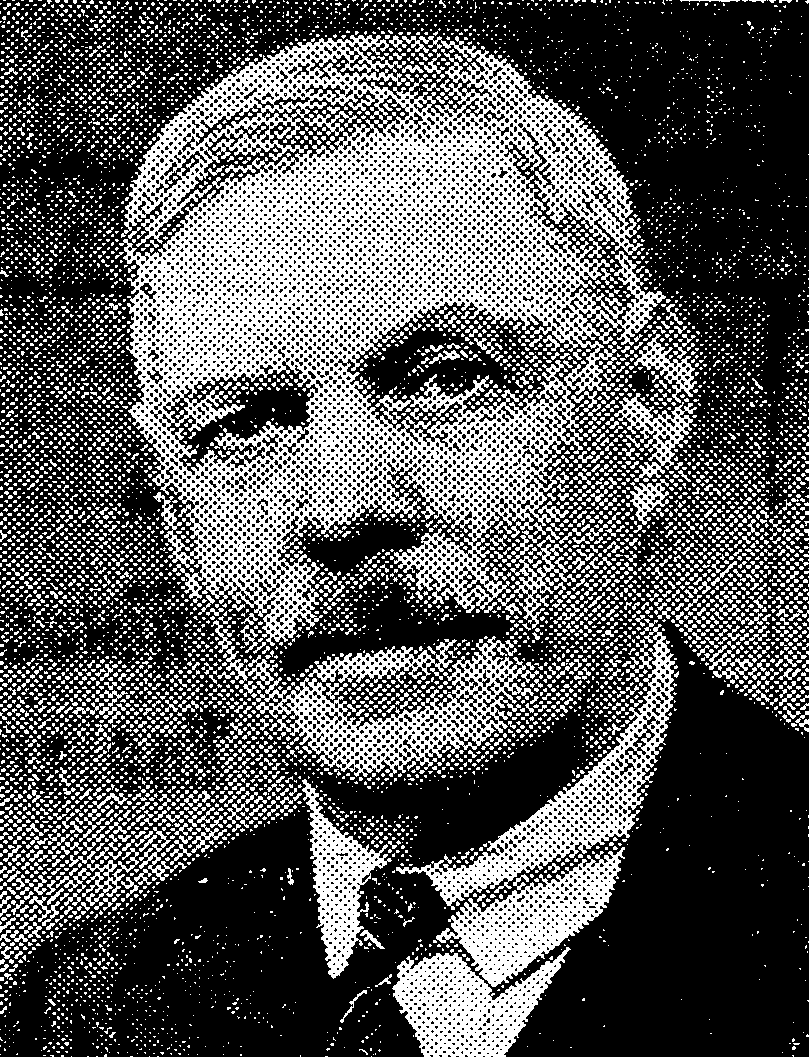

Personal information
- Born: 15 September 1871; Wellington, New Zealand
- Died: 4 August 1941 (aged 69); Wellington, New Zealand
- Batting: Right-handed
- Bowling: Right-arm medium

Domestic team information
- Years: Team
- 1891/92–1902/03: Wellington

Career statistics
Competition	First-class
Matches	12
Runs scored	153
Batting average	9.56
100s/50s	0/0
Top score	32
Balls bowled	1225
Wickets	33
Bowling average	17.42
5 wickets in innings	3
10 wickets in match	1
Best bowling	6/35
Catches/stumpings	7/–
- Source: CricketArchive, 5 March 2018

Frank Holdsworth (15 September 1871 – 4 August 1941) was a New Zealand cricketer who played 12 matches of first-class cricket for Wellington from 1892 to 1903. He was also a lawyer.

== Life and career ==
Holdsworth was a tall, powerfully built right-arm medium-pace bowler whose height enabled him to extract extra bounce from the pitch, and a hard-hitting right-handed tail-end batsman. In Wellington's innings victory over Hawke's Bay in 1896-97 he took 6 for 47 and 6 for 35. Earlier that season he had been Wellington's top scorer against the touring Australians, making 30.

After attending Wellington College and Wanganui Collegiate School, Holdsworth became a lawyer, and practised in Wellington for more than 40 years. He and his wife Winnie had two daughters and two sons.
