= Bernie Clark =

New Zealand cricketer

Personal information
- Full name: James Bernard Clark
- Born: 25 September 1910; Dunedin, New Zealand
- Died: 21 January 2003 (aged 92); Auckland, New Zealand
- Batting: Left-handed
- Role: Wicket-keeper
- Relatives: James Clark Baker (father)

Domestic team information
- Years: Team
- 1933/34–1934/35: Otago
- Source: ESPNcricinfo, 7 May 2016

James Bernard Clark (25 September 1910 – 21 January 2003), known as Bernie Clark, was a New Zealand cricketer. He played three first-class matches for Otago between the 1933–34 and 1934–35 seasons.

Clark was born at Dunedin in 1910 and educated at Otago Boys' High School. His father, James Clark Baker, played 41 first-class matches for Otago from 1889–90 to 1906–07.

Clark played as a wicket-keeper in club cricket for the Old Boys team, making his First Grade club debut during the 1932–33 season. He was described as being "amongst the best wicket-keepers in Dunedin" who kept "soundly" and showed "great promise". Clark's batting was considered a strength and he made his debut for Otago against Wellington in the team's final Plunket Shield match of the 1933–34 season. Playing as the team's wicket-keeper, he scored 25 runs in the first innings of the match, his highest first-class score, and retained his place for the first two matches of the following season before losing his place to Francis Toomey for the final match of the 1934–35 season. He scored a total of 63 runs and took five catches in his three first-class matches.

Professionally, Clark worked as an accountant. He died at Auckland in 2003 aged 92; following his death obituaries were published in the New Zealand Cricket Almanack and by Wisden.
