= Albion Cricket Club (Dunedin) =

Culling Park
Ground information
- Location: Musselburgh, New Zealand
- Country: New Zealand

International information

Albion Cricket Club is a cricket club based in Dunedin, New Zealand.

Founded in 1862, has often been dubbed the oldest continuously existing club in either New Zealand or Australia.

However, this title may belong, in New Zealand at least, to Motueka Cricket Club, in Motueka near Nelson, which has been a continuous cricket club since 1857. Albion nevertheless remains one of the oldest active clubs in the southern hemisphere.

In 2013, Albion stalwart Warwick Larkins, convener of the 150th celebrations, enquired in Sydney, Melbourne and Adelaide and found:

Melbourne Cricket Club [founded in 1838] is older than us, but no-one knew whether they had been continuous or not.

— Warwick Larkins,

The club's home ground is at Culling Park in Musselburgh.

The Albion club has produced 25 New Zealand internationals.

== List of internationals ==
Albion's roll of honour contains the names of many current and former international players, among them the following:

- Brendon Bracewell
- John Bracewell
- Mark Craig
- Alexander Downes
- Harry Graham
- Syd Hiddleston
- Billy Ibadulla
- Andrew Jones
- Brendon McCullum
- Nathan McCullum
- Barry Milburn
- Rachel Pullar
- Mark Richardson
- Ken Rutherford
- Bert Sutcliffe
- Martin Snedden
- Clare Taylor
- Jonathan Trott
- Glenn Turner
- Neil Wagner

As well as these internationals, the club boasts many more first-class players.

== 300 Club ==
One of the many quirks about Albion is the fact it was home to a group of 5 players to have scored first class triple centuries.

- Glenn Turner
- Mark Richardson
- Brendon McCullum
- Bert Sutcliffe
- Ken Rutherford

== Banners ==
The club has won the Dunedin senior cricket banner on thirteen occasions, and shared the honours on three further occasions.
