= Ronald Fox (cricketer) =

New Zealand cricketer (1880–1952)

Ronald Fox MC
Personal information
- Full name: Ronald Henry Fox
- Born: 23 January 1880; Dunedin, New Zealand
- Died: 27 August 1952 (aged 72); Bloxham, Oxfordshire, England
- Batting: Right-handed
- Role: Wicketkeeper

Career statistics
Competition	First-class
Matches	19
Runs scored	407
Batting average	15.65
100s/50s	0/1
Top score	54
Balls bowled	90
Wickets	2
Bowling average	25.50
5 wickets in innings	0
10 wickets in match	0
Best bowling	1/17
Catches/stumpings	26/8
- Source: Cricinfo, 20 November 2017

Ronald Henry Fox MC (23 January 1880 – 27 August 1952) was a New Zealand cricketer and British army officer.

Ronald Fox was born in Dunedin. His father worked for the Bank of New Zealand in the nearby town of Milton. After attending Haileybury and Imperial Service College in England from 1893 to 1898, he played club cricket in England, usually as a wicketkeeper, including a few games for Kent Second XI. He had played only four first-class matches for various teams between 1904 and 1906 when he was selected in the Marylebone Cricket Club side that toured New Zealand in 1906–07.

Fox played 10 of the 11 first-class matches on the tour, including the two unofficial Tests against New Zealand at the end of the tour. He made his highest first-class score in the second match against Otago, when he made 54 and put on 134 for the opening partnership with Peter Randall Johnson.

Fox continued to play for MCC in England until the First World War. He served as a captain in the Royal Field Artillery from 1914 to 1919. He was awarded the Military Cross and was mentioned in despatches.

In 1927, when the New Zealand cricket team were touring England for the first time, they invited Fox to play in one of their first-class matches. Aged 47, and 17 years after his previous first-class match, he opened the batting and made 4. The New Zealanders nevertheless beat the Civil Service cricket team, who were playing what turned out to be their only first-class match, by an innings.
