= Neville Tufnell =

English cricketer (1887–1951)

Personal information
- Full name: Neville Charsley Tufnell
- Born: 13 June 1887; Simla, Punjab, British India
- Died: 3 August 1951 (aged 64); Whitechapel, London, England
- Batting: Right-handed
- Role: Wicket-keeper

International information
- National side: England
- Only Test: 11 March 1910 v South Africa

Domestic team information
- Years: Team
- 1908–1910: Cambridge University
- 1922: Surrey

Career statistics
Competition	Test	First-class
Matches	1	70
Runs scored	14	1,514
Batting average	14.00	14.28
100s/50s	0/0	1/4
Top score	14	102
Balls bowled	–	84
Wickets	–	1
Bowling average	–	118.00
5 wickets in innings	–	0
10 wickets in match	–	0
Best bowling	–	1/54
Catches/stumpings	0/1	62/40
- Source: CricketArchive, 6 November 2022

Neville Charsley Tufnell (13 June 1887 – 3 August 1951) was a British cricketer and army officer.

Born in 1887 in Simla, Punjab, India, Tufnell played first-class cricket for Cambridge University and the Marylebone Cricket Club (MCC) in a first-class career as a wicketkeeper that lasted from 1906 to 1924. He was selected to tour New Zealand in 1906–07 with MCC before he had played a first-class match. He also played one Test match for England at Cape Town against South Africa in 1909–10 while still a student at Cambridge. He played a single first-class match for Surrey in 1922 against Oxford University, captaining the side.

Tufnell was educated at Eton and Trinity College, Cambridge. He was commissioned into the 1st Volunteer Battalion (later 4th Battalion), Queen's Royal Regiment (West Surrey) in 1908. He left before the First World War with the rank of captain, but rejoined with the same rank in 1914. He later transferred to the Grenadier Guards (Special Reserve). Tufnell was appointed a Gentleman Usher to George VI upon the King's accession. In 1939 he was appointed lieutenant-colonel as a group commander in the National Defence Companies, and transferred to the King's Royal Rifle Corps later the same year.

Tufnell was also involved in politics. In 1945 at the general election, he stood as the Liberal candidate for the Windsor division of Berkshire. He came third and did not stand for parliament again.

He died in 1951 in Whitechapel, London.
