= Philip Harrison (cricketer) =

English cricketer

Personal information
- Full name: William Philip Harrison
- Born: 13 November 1885; Finchley, Middlesex
- Died: 7 September 1964 (aged 78); Harrogate, Yorkshire
- Batting: Right-handed
- Bowling: Legbreak

Domestic team information
- Years: Team
- 1904–1905: Kent
- 1905–1907: Cambridge University
- 1906–1911: Middlesex
- FC debut: 16 June 1904 Kent v Nottinghamshire
- Last FC: 29 June 1911 Middlesex v Gloucestershire

Career statistics
Competition	First-class
Matches	56
Runs scored	1,896
Batting average	23.70
100s/50s	2/5
Top score	156
Balls bowled	201
Wickets	7
Bowling average	28.71
5 wickets in innings	0
10 wickets in match	0
Best bowling	4/61
Catches/stumpings	29/–
- Source: CricInfo, 24 October 2017

William Philip Harrison (13 November 1885 – 7 September 1964) was an English amateur first-class cricketer who played for Kent County Cricket Club, Cambridge University and Middlesex County Cricket Club between 1904 and 1911.

== Biography ==
He was born in Finchley (Middlesex) in 1885 and educated at Rugby School. He played cricket in the First XI at Rugby and made his first-class cricket debut for Kent in June 1904 against Nottinghamshire in the 1904 County Championship at Trent Bridge.

Harrison played seven times for Kent in 1904 and 1905 and four times for Cambridge University in 1905 before making his Middlesex debut in the 1906 season. He toured New Zealand in 1906/07 with an amateur MCC team, playing in nine of the 11 first-class matches and a number of minor matches on the tour. He played in both matches against New Zealand, although these are not classed as Test matches. He scored his maiden first-class century in the second match against Otago, 105 in 90 minutes.

After gaining his cricket Blue in 1907, he played most frequently for Middlesex in 1908 and made 29 first-class appearances for the county in a career that ended in 1911. His highest score, 156 runs, came in his final first-class innings.

Harrison died at Harrogate in Yorkshire in 1964 aged 78.

== Bibliography ==
- Carlaw, Derek (2020). Kent County Cricketers, A to Z: Part One (1806–1914) (PDF). Cardiff: ACS.
