= Wilfred Curwen =

English cricketer and Royal Fusilier

Personal information
- Full name: Wilfred John Hutton Curwen
- Born: 14 April 1883; Beckenham, Kent, England
- Died: 9 May 1915 (aged 32) near Poperinghe, Ypres salient, Belgium
- Batting: Right-handed
- Bowling: Right-arm fast-medium

Domestic team information
- Years: Team
- 1906: Oxford University
- 1909: Surrey

Career statistics
Competition	First-class
Matches	25
Runs scored	511
Batting average	13.10
100s/50s	0/1
Top score	76
Balls bowled	1720
Wickets	26
Bowling average	32.73
5 wickets in innings	1
10 wickets in match	0
Best bowling	5/81
Catches/stumpings	12/–
- Source: Cricinfo, 29 July 2019

Captain Wilfred John Hutton Curwen (14 April 1883 – 9 May 1915) was an English first-class cricketer who played for Oxford University, Surrey and MCC between 1906 and 1910. He was born in Beckenham and died near Poperinghe, Belgium, on active service during World War I.

Curwen was educated at Charterhouse School and Magdalen College, Oxford. At Oxford he was a double blue in cricket and association football. One of the team of amateur MCC cricketers that toured New Zealand in 1906-07, Curwen was described before the tour thus: "Plays all the games, is very popular with the ladies, and dances divinely." He made his highest first-class score in the tour match against Canterbury, when he went to the wicket with the score at 54 for 6 and made a dashing 76 in 77 minutes, taking the total to 200 before he was last out.

Curwen joined the London Regiment as a lieutenant in 1911. He went to Australia, where he served as aide-de-camp to the Governor of Victoria, Sir John Fuller, and two Governors-General of Australia, Baron Denman and Sir Ronald Munro Ferguson. When the First World War began he returned to Great Britain and joined the Royal Fusiliers. He was killed in action in the Second Battle of Ypres.
