= William Richardson (New South Wales cricketer) =

Australian cricketer (1866–1930)

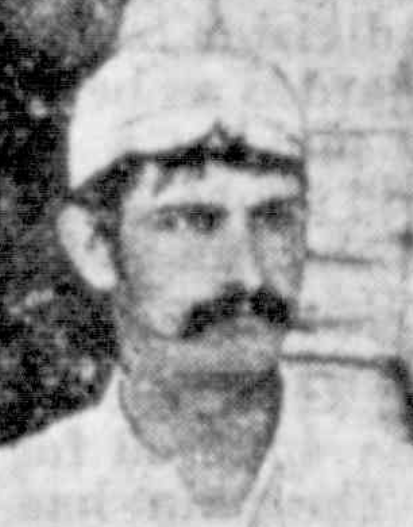

Personal information
- Full name: William Alfred Richardson
- Born: 22 August 1866; Sydney, Australia
- Died: 3 January 1930 (aged 63); Mosman, Sydney, Australia
- Batting: Right-handed
- Bowling: Right-arm fast-medium
- Relatives: Charles Richardson (brother)

Domestic team information
- Years: Team
- 1887/88–1895/96: New South Wales

Career statistics
Competition	First-class
Matches	12
Runs scored	237
Batting average	14.81
100s/50s	0/2
Top score	76
Balls bowled	1,080
Wickets	22
Bowling average	26.22
5 wickets in innings	0
10 wickets in match	0
Best bowling	4/18
Catches/stumpings	13/–
- Source: Cricinfo, 22 September 2026

William Alfred Richardson (22 August 1866 – 3 January 1930) was an Australian cricketer. He played twelve first-class matches for New South Wales between 1887/88 and 1895/96.

Richardson was an all-rounder. His highest first-class score for New South Wales was 76 against Victoria in the 1895–96 Sheffield Shield. His best first-class bowling figures were 4 for 43 against South Australia in 1889–90.

Richardson attended Sydney Grammar School before going to work for National Mutual Insurance. He never married, and died at his home in Mosman in January 1930, aged 63. His brother Charles captained the New Zealand cricket team.
