= Charles Page (cricketer) =

English cricketer

Personal information
- Full name: Charles Carew Page
- Born: 25 April 1884; Barnet, Hertfordshire, England
- Died: 10 April 1921 (aged 36); Woking, Surrey, England
- Batting: Right-handed

Domestic team information
- Years: Team
- 1905 to 1909: Middlesex
- 1905 to 1906: Cambridge University

Career statistics
Competition	First-class
Matches	71
Runs scored	2920
Batting average	26.30
100s/50s	2/17
Top score	164*
Balls bowled	78
Wickets	1
Bowling average	53.00
5 wickets in innings	0
10 wickets in match	0
Best bowling	1/25
Catches/stumpings	29/0
- Source: CricketArchive, 1 October 2019

Charles Carew Page (25 April 1884 – 10 April 1921) was an English amateur cricketer who played first-class cricket for Middlesex and Cambridge University from 1905 to 1909. He was born in Barnet and died in Woking after falling down stairs in his home.

A "free and stylish batsman", Page's highest score was 164 not out for Middlesex against Somerset at Lord's in 1908, made out of 262 in 110 minutes, and including 28 fours. His other century was 117 for Middlesex against Lancashire, also at Lord's, in 1905. He toured New Zealand with the MCC in 1906–07, playing in both of the matches against New Zealand at the end of the tour.

Page was also a football player for Cambridge, Old Malvernians and the Corinthians.
