= Robert Neill (cricketer) =

New Zealand cricketer

Personal information
- Born: 20 January 1864; Greenock, Scotland
- Died: 27 August 1930 (aged 66); Auckland, New Zealand
- Batting: Right-handed
- Bowling: Right-arm leg-spin
- Relatives: Thomas Neill (brother)

Domestic team information
- Years: Team
- 1889/90–1905/06: Auckland

Career statistics
| Competition | First-class |
|---|---|
| Matches | 20 |
| Runs scored | 454 |
| Batting average | 14.64 |
| 100s/50s | 0/1 |
| Top score | 94 |
| Balls bowled | 3,774 |
| Wickets | 134 |
| Bowling average | 12.90 |
| 5 wickets in innings | 16 |
| 10 wickets in match | 7 |
| Best bowling | 9/75 |
| Catches/stumpings | 16/– |
- Source: CricketArchive, 1 February 2017

Robert Neill (20 January 1864 – 27 August 1930) was a New Zealand cricketer who played first-class cricket for Auckland between 1889 and 1906.

== Life and career ==
Neill grew up in Britain, then migrated to New Zealand, where he became a grain merchant in Auckland. At the time of his death aged 66 in August 1930 he was chairman of the United Permanent Building and Investment Society. His wife Nina predeceased him. They had one daughter.

A leg-spin bowler who usually opened the bowling, Neill took 9 for 75 in the first innings against Canterbury in 1891–92, in his second first-class match. He played for New Zealand in two matches in 1896-97: the loss to the Australians and the victory over the touring Queensland team. He again took nine wickets in an innings in 1897–98, 9 for 86 in the first innings of Auckland's loss to Canterbury.

When the cricket historian Tom Reese compiled his history of early New Zealand cricket, New Zealand Cricket, 1841–1914, in 1927, he selected a 14-man team of the best New Zealand cricketers of the period from 1860 to 1914. Neill was one of those selected.
