= Marylebone Cricket Club in New Zealand in 1906–07 =

International cricket tour

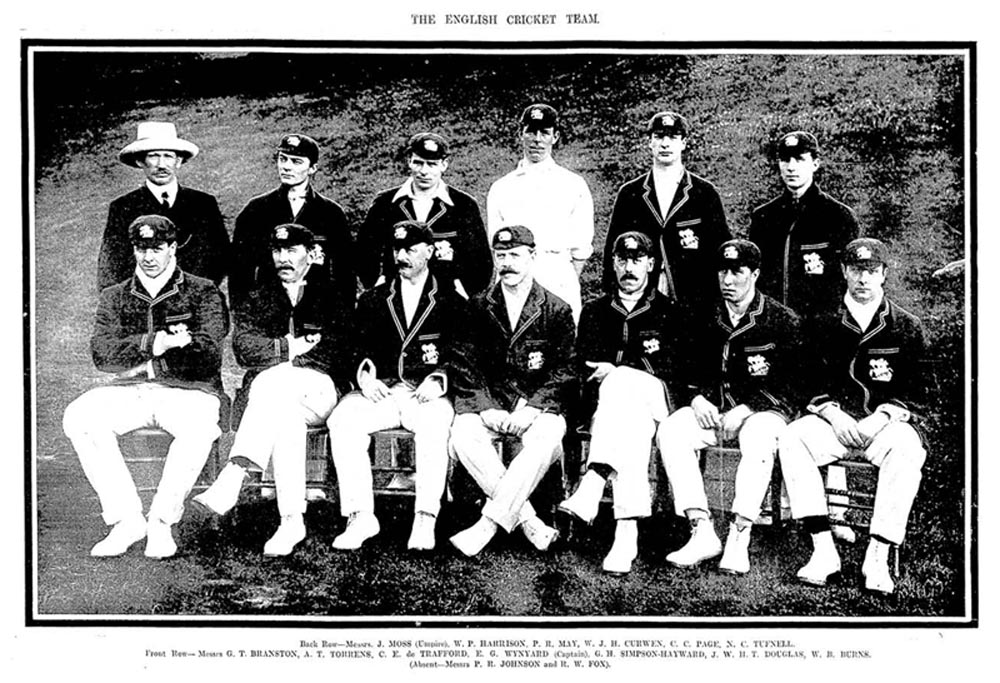
The MCC team that toured New Zealand in 1906-07.

An English team raised by the Marylebone Cricket Club (MCC) toured New Zealand between December 1906 and March 1907. The tour comprised two first-class matches against New Zealand, two each against the four main provincial teams – Auckland, Canterbury, Otago and Wellington – and one against Hawke's Bay. There were also five minor matches against teams from country areas.

== The team ==
The team, which consisted entirely of amateurs, most of them young and inexperienced, was captained by Teddy Wynyard and included future Test players like Johnny Douglas and George Simpson-Hayward.

- Teddy Wynyard (captain)
- Trevor Branston
- William Burns
- Wilfred Curwen
- Charles de Trafford
- Johnny Douglas
- Ronald Fox
- Philip Harrison
- Peter Randall Johnson
- Percy May
- Charles Page
- George Simpson-Hayward
- Attwood Torrens
- Neville Tufnell
- Philip Williams

Several notable amateurs were asked to tour but were unable to set aside the necessary six months to do so. They included Lord Hawke, Kenneth Hutchings, Reggie Spooner, H. D. G. Leveson Gower, Leonard Moon, Frederick Fane, Neville Knox and Henry Martyn. The Auckland Star's London correspondent wrote: "On the whole, the team does not appeal to me as being particularly formidable, and I fancy the best New Zealand teams will prove quite equal to lowering the visitors' colours."

The team took their own umpire with them, John Moss, who officiated in all their matches, sharing the duties with a local official.

== The tour ==
The team left England on the Corinthic on 20 October 1906 and arrived in Wellington on 6 December. The New Zealand government allowed them to travel on the railways for 40 pounds.

First-class matches are indicated in bold.

- **Auckland v MCC**, Auckland Domain, Auckland, 14, 15, 17 December 1906. MCC 172 and 241; Auckland 195 and 131 for 5. Drawn.
- Wanganui v MCC, Cook's Gardens, Wanganui, 21, 22 December 1906. MCC 453 for 9 declared; Wanganui XV 124 and 95. MCC won by an innings and 234 runs.
- **Wellington v MCC**, Basin Reserve, Wellington, 25, 26, 27 December 1906. MCC 204 and 259; Wellington 211 and 148 for 5. Drawn.

Arnold Williams, Wellington's captain, scored 100. It was the only century scored against the MCC. Wynyard injured his knee so badly while fielding that he was unable to play again on the tour; de Trafford took over the captaincy.

- **Canterbury v MCC**, Lancaster Park, Christchurch, 29, 31 December 1906, 1 January 1907. MCC 202 and 156; Canterbury 241 and 120 for 3. Canterbury won by seven wickets.

The MCC team attributed this loss largely to the voyage from Wellington to Christchurch in rough weather in an overcrowded ship – 660 passengers where there was accommodation for only 360 – and the fact that they had no time to recover. The ship arrived at Lyttelton at 11 a.m. and play began at Lancaster Park at 2.40 p.m. It was the MCC's only loss to a provincial team.

- **Otago v MCC**, Carisbrook, Dunedin, 4, 5, 7 January 1907. MCC 224 and 278; Otago 176 and 94. MCC won by 232 runs.
- West Coast v MCC, Recreation Ground, Greymouth, 11, 12, 13 January 1907. West Coast XVIII 132 and 200; MCC 252 and 81 for 5. MCC won by five wickets.
- Marlborough and Nelson v MCC, Trafalgar Park, Nelson, 18, 19 January 1907. Marlborough and Nelson XV 98 and 121; MCC 149 and 29 for 3. Drawn.
- Manawatu v MCC, Sports Ground, Palmerston North, 22, 23 January 1907. Manawatu XIII 123 and 95; MCC 253. MCC won by an innings and 35 runs.
- **Auckland v MCC**, Auckland Domain, Auckland, 26, 28, 29 January 1907. Auckland 127 and 241; MCC 214 and 156 for 8. MCC won by two wickets.
- **Canterbury v MCC**, Lancaster Park, Christchurch, 2, 4, 5 February 1907. MCC 305 and 260 for 9 declared; Canterbury 221 and 108. MCC won by 236 runs.

Branston scored 119 in the first innings, the first of the two centuries scored by MCC batsmen.

- **Otago v MCC**, Carisbrook, Dunedin, 8, 9, 11 February 1907. MCC 496; Otago 257 and 144. MCC won by an innings and 95 runs.

Harrison scored 105 with 20 fours, reaching his century in an hour and a half; MCC made 483 for 9 on the first day.

- **Wellington v MCC**, Basin Reserve, Wellington, 15, 16, 18 February 1907. MCC 201 and 48 for 5; Wellington 191. Drawn.
- Wairarapa v MCC, Park Oval, Masterton, 19, 20 February 1907. Wairarapa XV 120 and 65; MCC 272 for 7 declared. MCC won by an innings and 87 runs.
- **Hawke's Bay v MCC**, Recreation Ground, Napier, 22, 23, 25 February 1907. MCC 394; Hawke's Bay 151 and 163. MCC won by an innings and 80 runs.
- **New Zealand v MCC**, Lancaster Park, Christchurch, 28 February, 1, 2, 4 March 1907. New Zealand 207 and 187; MCC 257 and 140 for 1. MCC won by nine wickets.

Johnson made 99 and 76 not out for MCC, and Douglas took 5 for 56 and 4 for 41. New Zealand's best performance was Jeremiah Mahoney's 71 not out in the first innings.

- **New Zealand v MCC**, Basin Reserve, Wellington, 8, 9, 11 March 1907. New Zealand 165 and 249; MCC 160 and 198. New Zealand won by 56 runs.

The pitch was vandalized the night before the match. It was repaired as well as it could be before play began, but still left an uneven surface that made batting difficult and even dangerous at times; several batsmen were injured. New Zealand's captain for this match, Arnold Williams, was the highest scorer on either side, with 72 not out in the second innings; Ernest Upham took 6 for 84 and 1 for 51, and Arthur Fisher 4 for 25 and 5 for 61. For MCC, Douglas took 7 for 49 and 5 for 75, giving him 21 wickets at an average of 10.52 in the two matches against New Zealand.

== Leading players ==
In the first-class matches Johnson was the highest scorer, with 546 runs at an average of 32.11. Douglas had the best batting average, with 398 runs at 36.18. Eight batsmen averaged 24 or more.

Douglas took the most wickets in the first-class matches and had the best bowling average: 50 wickets at 13.26. His opening partner May took 45 at 15.97, Branston took 36 at 18.69, and the underarm bowler Simpson-Hayward took 35 at 16.88. No one else took more than six wickets. In all matches Douglas took 84 wickets at 10.34.

== Assessments ==
The tour was not a financial success, leaving the New Zealand Cricket Council to make up the deficit and casting doubt over the viability of future tours by overseas teams.

== Bibliography ==
- May, Percy (1907), With the MCC in New Zealand. London: Eyre & Spottiswoode.
- Ryan, Greg (2004) The Making of New Zealand Cricket 1832–1914. London. Portland, Oregon: Frank Cass Publishers.
- Neely, Don, R.P. King & F.K. Payne (1986) Men in White: The History of New Zealand International Cricket. Auckland, NZ: Moa Publications, pp. 48–50.
