= Charles Richardson (cricketer, born 1864) =

New Zealand cricketer

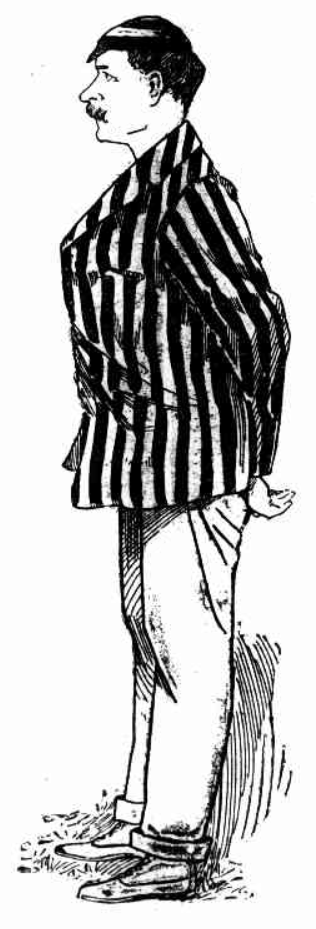

Personal information
- Full name: Charles Augustus Richardson
- Born: 22 February 1864; Sydney, Australia
- Died: 17 August 1949 (aged 85); Waipara, Canterbury, New Zealand
- Batting: Right-handed
- Relatives: William Richardson (brother)

Domestic team information
- Years: Team
- 1886/87–1894/95: New South Wales
- 1897/98–1906/07: Wellington

Career statistics
Competition	First-class
Matches	30
Runs scored	1079
Batting average	25.09
100s/50s	1/5
Top score	113
Balls bowled	347
Wickets	3
Bowling average	64.33
5 wickets in innings	0
10 wickets in match	0
Best bowling	2/12
Catches/stumpings	22/–
- Source: Cricket Archive, 14 November 2014

Charles Augustus Richardson (22 February 1864 – 17 August 1949) was an Australian-born cricketer who captained the New Zealand cricket team and scored its first century. He also scored the world's first first-class century of the 1900s.

== Early career ==
Richardson was born in Sydney and attended Sydney Grammar School. He spent several seasons as a batsman in the New South Wales team, scoring 473 runs at an average of 22.52 in 15 matches between 1886–87 and 1894–95. His highest score was 75 not out against South Australia in 1892–93 in his first Sheffield Shield match; it was also the highest score in the match, which New South Wales won by an innings.

Richardson moved to New Zealand late in 1897 to take charge of the New Zealand office of the Mutual Life Association of Australasia, and played his first match for Wellington a few days later, scoring 77 in an innings victory over Canterbury. He was selected to tour Australia with the New Zealand team in 1898–99, but was unable to obtain leave from his work to make the trip.

He captained Wellington in two matches in the 1899–1900 season, and scored 113 in the match against Otago, reaching his century on 1 January 1900, thus becoming the world's first first-class century-maker of the 1900s. He and Frederick Midlane, who reached his century during the previous day's play and ended up scoring 149, added 207 for the fourth wicket.

== Playing for New Zealand ==
Richardson played his first match for New Zealand a few weeks later against the touring Melbourne Cricket Club. Although Melbourne did not have first-class status, they were too strong for New Zealand, winning by an innings. In the second innings, Richardson, batting at number three, scored 114 not out in a total of 246, the first time anyone had scored a century for New Zealand.

He was appointed New Zealand's captain for their next series, two matches against Lord Hawke's XI in 1902–03. However, apart from winning the toss in both matches he had little success, scoring 44 runs in two losses by large margins. He did not play for New Zealand again. Dan Reese, who scored a century in the second match, later said, "no more likeable man has led New Zealand sides; he was also an able leader".

== Later career ==
Richardson captained Wellington in his last first-class match in 1906–07, against the touring MCC. For some years he held the record for the number of runs scored in a season of Wellington club cricket: 553. He later served on the selection panel for Wellington.

His younger brother William also played for New South Wales, from 1887 to 1896.
