= George Burnes =

New Zealand cricketer

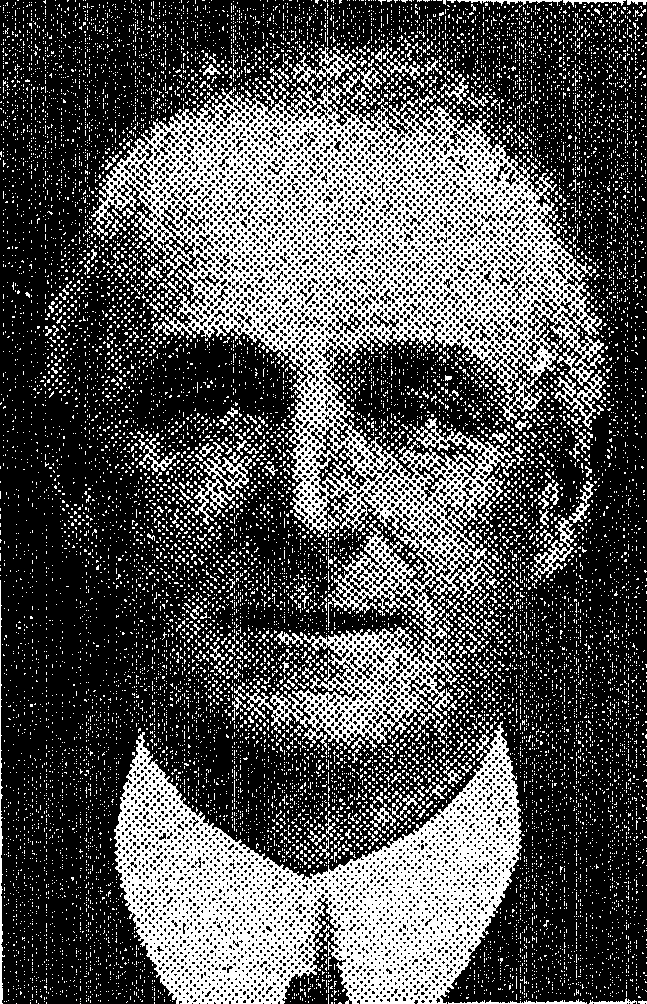

Personal information
- Full name: George Gordon Burnes
- Born: 11 July 1866; St Kilda, Victoria, Australia
- Died: 9 February 1949 (aged 82); Christchurch, New Zealand

Domestic team information
- Years: Team
- 1883/84–1886/87: Wellington

Career statistics
| Competition | First-class |
|---|---|
| Matches | 6 |
| Runs scored | 90 |
| Batting average | 9.00 |
| 100s/50s | 0/0 |
| Top score | 32 |
| Catches/stumpings | 2/– |
- Source: Cricinfo, 27 September 2015

George Gordon Burnes (11 July 1866 – 9 February 1949) was a businessman and first-class cricketer in New Zealand.

== Personal life and business career ==
The son of Adam Burnes, who was the first general manager of the National Bank of New Zealand, George Burnes had five brothers and a sister. He attended Wellington College, Wellington.

Burnes was the Australian Mutual Provident Society's district manager in Invercargill, and then served as manager in Christchurch for 13 years until his retirement in 1930 after 49 years' service with the company. After retiring, he spent most of the rest of his life travelling the world. He served as an air raid warden in London during World War II. He and his wife Anna had one child, a daughter who died in her teens.

== Cricket career ==
Burnes played six first-class matches for Wellington between 1884 and 1887. His highest score was 32, when he top-scored against Auckland in his last first-class match in 1887.

After moving to Invercargill in 1887 he immediately became the district's best player: in the 1887–88 season he was the top run-scorer in Invercargill (331 runs), with the highest batting average (41.37), took 33 wickets at the best bowling average (3.69), and made the first century in Invercargill cricket. He was one of the founders of the Southland Cricket Association in 1892. He captained the Southland representative team in the 1890s. In Southland's first representative match after the formation of the association, he top-scored with 34 against Otago. The match against Otago remained an annual event until the 1980s. In 1895-96 Burnes captained Southland to their first victory in the series.

Against the Australian touring team in 1896–97, his innings of 18 was the only double-figure score made by any of the Southland XXII. Still the captain, he also top-scored with 47 for a Southland XIII against Queensland two months later.

He was selected to tour Australia with the New Zealand team in 1898-99 but was unable to make the trip.
