= Jeremiah Mahoney (cricketer) =

New Zealand cricketer

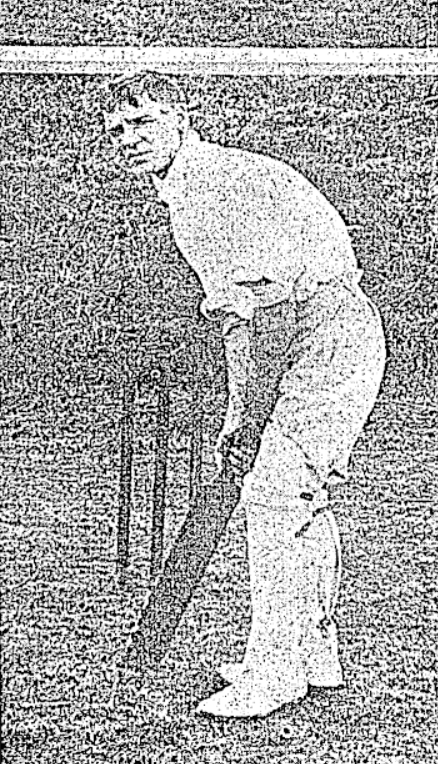
- Mahony in 1910

Personal information
- Full name: Jeremiah John Mahoney
- Born: 26 July 1880; Sydney, Australia
- Died: 1 August 1966 (aged 86); Sydney
- Batting: Right-handed
- Role: Wicketkeeper-batsman

Domestic team information
- Years: Team
- 1902–03 to 1911–12: Wellington

Career statistics
Competition	First-class
Matches	25
Runs scored	1053
Batting average	25.07
100s/50s	0/5
Top score	84
Balls bowled	54
Wickets	1
Bowling average	55.00
5 wickets in innings	0
10 wickets in match	0
Best bowling	1/34
Catches/stumpings	16/4
- Source: CricketArchive, 24 January 2017

Jeremiah John Mahoney (26 July 1880 – 1 August 1966), sometimes spelt Mahony, was an Australian-born cricketer who played four times for New Zealand in the days before New Zealand played Test cricket.

== Cricket career ==
Born in Sydney, Mahoney played as a batsman and occasional wicket-keeper for Wellington from 1902–03 to 1911–12. After top-scoring with 40 not out in a Wellington total of 140 against Lord Hawke's XI in 1902–03, he was selected to play in both the matches New Zealand played against Lord Hawke's XI. In the second match he scored 27 (the second-top score) and 24 (top score) in an innings defeat.

Against Canterbury in 1906–07 Mahoney hit his highest score so far when he made 63 not out, the top score in the match, in the second innings. He was again selected for both of New Zealand's matches later that season, against the touring MCC side. In the first match, batting at number six, he scored 71 not out, adding 82 with the last two batsmen to take New Zealand's total to 207. His 214 runs at an average of 42.80 made him one of the leading batsmen of the season.

In his two matches in 1907–08 he scored 209 runs at 69.66, again putting him near the top of the national averages, and made his highest score of 84, the top score in the match, in Wellington's victory over Otago.

According to Dan Reese, who played with him in three of his matches for New Zealand, Mahoney was a stubborn batsman and "was a little deaf and took a lot of watching in running singles, or the last run from a hit to the outfield".

== Later life ==
Mahoney worked in Wellington as a tailor's presser. He returned to Australia in 1912 to live in Sydney. His wife died there in November 1913 after a long illness. He died in Sydney in August 1966, aged 86.
