= James Clark Baker =

New Zealand cricketer (1866–1939)

James Baker
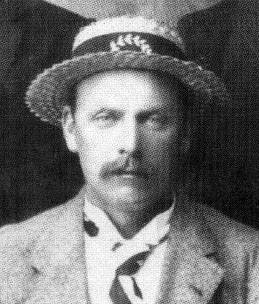
- Baker in 1898

Personal information
- Born: 13 November 1866; London, England
- Died: 1 February 1939 (aged 72); Dunedin, New Zealand
- Batting: Right-handed
- Relatives: Bernie Clark (son)

Domestic team information
- Years: Team
- 1889/90–1906/07: Otago

Career statistics
Competition	First-class
Matches	41
Runs scored	1,476
Batting average	20.50
100s/50s	1/6
Top score	103
Balls bowled	212
Wickets	5
Bowling average	17.60
5 wickets in innings	0
10 wickets in match	0
Best bowling	2/11
Catches/stumpings	20/–
- Source: CricketArchive, 30 September 2014

James Clark Baker (13 November 1866 – 1 February 1939), also known as James Clark, was an English-born New Zealand cricketer who played first-class cricket for Otago between the 1889/90 and 1906/07 seasons. Baker was born at London in England. In 1902 he scored Otago's first century in first-class cricket.

== Cricket career ==
After two unsuccessful matches for Otago in 1889–90, Baker played a leading part in Otago's victory over Canterbury in 1890–91. In a match in which only 443 runs were scored, Otago needed 121 runs to win and were 32 for 7 before Baker, displaying "unsuspected virtuosity", attacked the bowling and finished on 45 not out in a one-wicket victory.

For the rest of his career he usually opened the batting. He scored his first fifty in 1894–95, when he made 80, the only fifty in the match, against Fiji. He also made the highest score of the match when he scored 53 in Otago's victory over Canterbury in 1895–96.

"A splendid batsman and a most attractive player to watch", Baker played his first match for New Zealand in 1896–97 against the Australians, when New Zealand fielded a team of 15. Later in the season he scored 36 and 19 in New Zealand's victory over Queensland. He was one of the three players who formed the selection committee on New Zealand's short tour of Australia in 1898-99, when he was the leading run-scorer in the two first-class matches (109 at 27.25) and in all matches (290 at 41.42).

He played for the Grange club in Dunedin. When he made 103, Otago's first-ever century, on New Year's Day 1902 at the Carisbrook ground against Hawke's Bay, the Otago Daily Times said "the burly Grange man gave an exhibition that is not likely to be eclipsed for many a day ... his strokes were powerful and clean". He brought up his century with a four to leg off the bowling of Albert Trott, and added 171 for the fourth wicket with his captain, Albert Geddes. It was the only century scored in New Zealand first-class cricket in 1901–02. Otago won the match by an innings; it was their 62nd first-class match.

The New Zealand cricket historian Tom Reese regarded Baker as the best batsman in New Zealand in the 1890s, describing him as "a solid player in every way, at home on fast or slow wickets, and combining good defence with hitting ability".

== Personal life ==
Clark Baker was born in London in 1866 and emigrated to New Zealand in about 1880, settling at Dunedin. He was christened "James Clark", changed his name to that of his stepfather and played during his cricket career as "James Baker", then changed back to Clark later. His son Bernie Clark played cricket for Otago in the 1930s.

He played cricket for the Grange club in Dunedin before moving to Albion Cricket Club later in his career. He also played rugby union for Alhambra in Dunedin and represented the Otago Rugby Football Union in provincial matches.

On the day of Baker's funeral the Otago and Canterbury players paused for a minute or two during their Plunket Shield match at Carisbrook as a mark of respect.
