= Charles McAllen =

Australian cricketer

Personal information
- Born: 2 July 1860; Hobart, Tasmania, Australia
- Died: 15 January 1924 (aged 63); Hobart, Tasmania, Australia
- Batting: Right-handed
- Role: Wicket-keeper

Domestic team information
- Years: Team
- 1889/90–1900/01: Tasmania
- Source: Cricinfo, 14 January 2016

Charles McAllen (2 July 1860 – 15 January 1924) was an Australian cricketer. He played ten first-class matches for Tasmania between 1889 and 1901.

Born at Hobart in 1860, McAllen was a member of Derwent Cricket Club in the city. A wicket-keeper, he made his first-class debut in a January 1890 match against Victoria. Described by Wisden as "an excellent batsman and wicket-keeper", he scored a total of 248 first-class runs with a highest score of 53 not out. He later umpired.

McAllen died at Hobart in 1924. He was aged 65.
