= Harold Griffith (Australian cricketer) =

Australian cricketer

Personal information
- Born: 30 October 1879; Sydney, Australia
- Died: 30 May 1947 (aged 67); Herston, Queensland, Australia
- Source: Cricinfo, 3 October 2020

Harold Griffith (10 October 1879 – 30 May 1947) was an Australian cricketer. He played in five first-class matches for Queensland between 1902 and 1905.

== See also ==
- List of Queensland first-class cricketers
