= Ernest Upham =

New Zealand cricketer

Ernie Upham
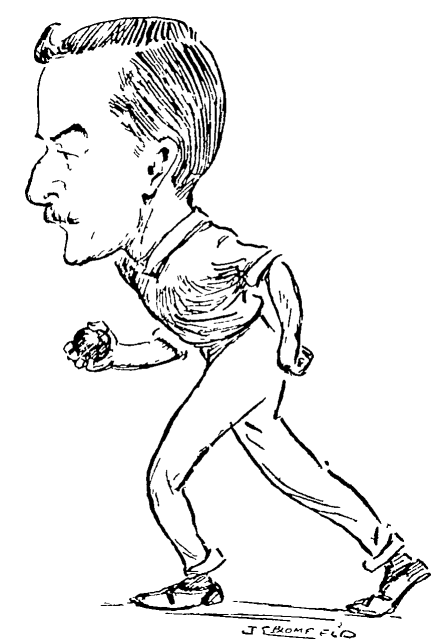
- 1909 portrait of Ernie Upham

Personal information
- Full name: Ernest Francis Upham
- Born: 24 March 1873; Wellington, New Zealand
- Died: 23 October 1935 (aged 62); Paekākāriki, New Zealand
- Batting: Right-handed
- Bowling: Right-arm medium-pace

Domestic team information
- Years: Team
- 1892–93 to 1909–10: Wellington

Career statistics
Competition	First-class
Matches	49
Runs scored	716
Batting average	11.93
100s/50s	0/2
Top score	52
Balls bowled	11,148
Wickets	264
Bowling average	16.71
5 wickets in innings	19
10 wickets in match	1
Best bowling	7/24
Catches/stumpings	36/0
- Source: Cricket Archive, 22 November 2016

Ernest Frederick Upham (24 March 1873 – 23 October 1935) was a New Zealand cricketer who played first-class cricket for Wellington from 1892 to 1910. He also represented New Zealand.

== Cricket career ==
Ernie Upham bowled right-arm medium pace, batted right-handed in the lower order, and was a fine slips fieldsman. He played for New Zealand several times between 1896 and 1907, in the days before New Zealand gained Test status, including the tour of Australia in 1898–99 and the two matches against Australia in 1905. He took 6 for 84 in the first innings to set up New Zealand's victory over the MCC at the Basin Reserve in 1906–07.

His best first-class innings figures came in the second innings of Wellington's match against Canterbury in 1901–02: Canterbury needed 91 to win, and won by three wickets, but Upham took 7 for 24, bowling six of his victims. His best match figures came two years later when, captaining Wellington against Auckland, he took 6 for 45 and 4 for 44 (match figures of 65.5–28–89–10) in a 90-run victory.

Dick Brittenden said of him: "Upham, a pace bowler of the highest class, indulged in the eccentricity of wearing his cap back to front while he was bowling. He took a run of only about 10 paces, and with a smooth delivery and high right arm, he could achieve a thunderous break-back." When the cricket historian Tom Reese compiled his history of early New Zealand cricket, New Zealand Cricket, 1841–1914, in 1927, he selected a 14-man team of the best New Zealand cricketers of the period from 1860 to 1914. Upham was one of those selected.

== Personal life ==
Upham was born in Wellington and attended Thorndon School. He became a law clerk, and spent his working life with the Wellington law firm Bell, Gully and Izard, where he was noted for his knowledge of Māori law.

Upham married Sarah Smith in Wellington in December 1897. They had two sons, Cyril and Frank. She died in January 1920. He remarried, and when he died in October 1935 he was survived by his second wife.
