= Arnold Williams (cricketer) =

New Zealand cricketer

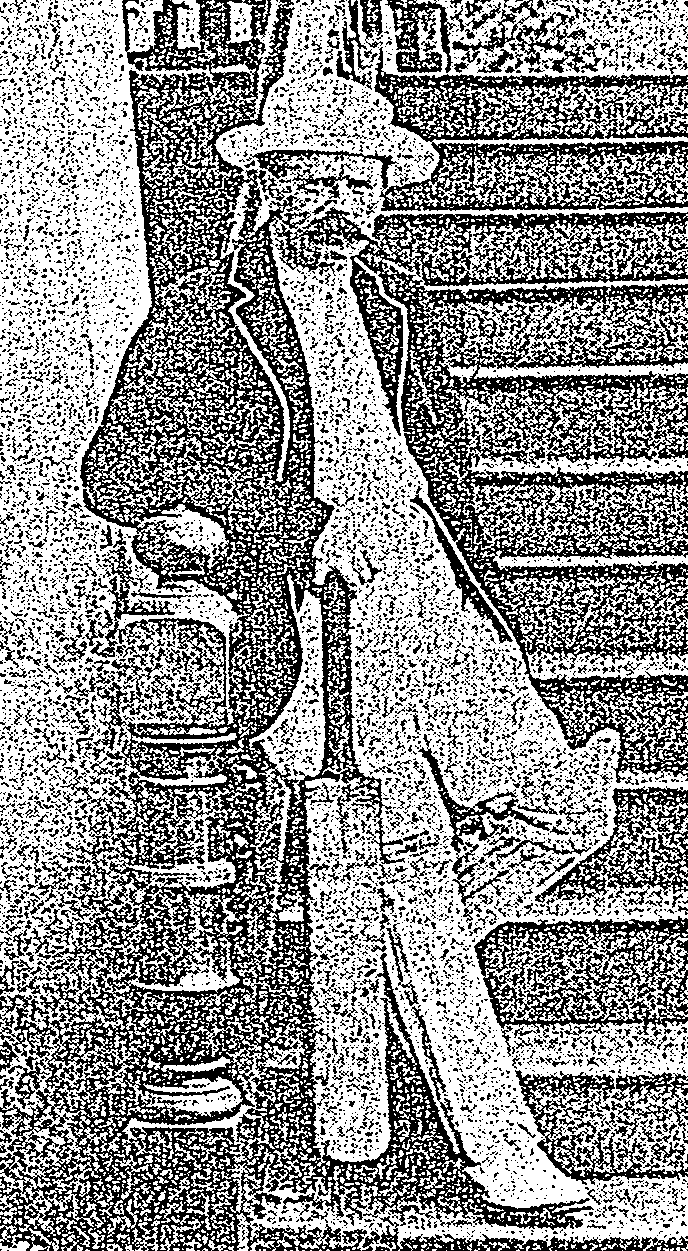

Personal information
- Full name: Arnold Butler Williams
- Born: 6 January 1870; Swansea, Glamorgan, Wales
- Died: 20 August 1929 (aged 59); Wellington, New Zealand
- Batting: Right-handed
- Role: Wicketkeeper-batsman

Domestic team information
- Years: Team
- 1886/87–1894/95: Otago
- 1896/97–1909/10: Wellington

Career statistics
Competition	First-class
Matches	26
Runs scored	785
Batting average	17.44
100s/50s	2/2
Top score	163
Catches/stumpings	23/15
- Source: CricketArchive, 21 October 2014

Arnold Butler Williams (6 January 1870 – 20 August 1929) was a Welsh-born cricketer who played first-class cricket for Otago and Wellington between the 1886–87 and 1909–10 seasons, and captained New Zealand in the days before New Zealand played Test cricket.

== Early life ==
Arnold Williams's father, William Butler Williams, brought his family to New Zealand in 1880 when he took up an appointment as a master at Otago Boys' High School. He taught there and at the University of Otago until his death in 1895. Arnold was one of three sons and four daughters and was educated at Otago Boys' High, where he played cricket.

== Career with Otago ==
Arnold Williams, "entertaining as a batsman of the punishing type and brilliant as a wicket-keeper", made his first-class debut for Otago against Canterbury in 1886–87 at the age of 17. Playing as a middle-order batsman, he scored 3 and 9. Thereafter he mostly played as a wicketkeeper-batsman. He played regularly for Otago between until 1894–95, but in his first nine first-class matches his highest score was 19.

== Career with Wellington and New Zealand ==
In 1895 Williams moved to Wellington, where for some years he was one of the highest scorers in Wellington club cricket. On the basis of his club form he was selected in the New Zealand team of 15 to play the Australians in November 1896. After scoring 21 in the first innings of 129, he scored 73 out of 247 in the second innings. Writing 50 years later Dan Reese said this innings, "considering the calibre of the bowling, still ranks as one of the finest innings ever played for this country". A few weeks later, in his first first-class match for Wellington, he scored 163 against Canterbury, an innings the Evening Post reporter described as "magnificent ... stamps him as being at the present time the best batsman in the colony". It set a record for the highest first-class score for Wellington.

Williams was selected to tour Australia with the New Zealanders in 1898–99 but had to withdraw when he was unable to obtain leave. Dan Reese believed Williams was "the best batsman in New Zealand at this time".

Williams captained Wellington in seven matches between 1902–03 and 1909–10. In the 13 first-class matches of the 1906–07 season he was the only New Zealander to score a century. For Wellington against MCC he made 100 in just over two hours, with 16 fours, putting on 26 for the last wicket with Ernest Upham to reach his century and pass MCC's first-innings total. Later that season he captained New Zealand in the second match against MCC after MCC had won the first match. On a difficult pitch, against hostile fast bowling by Johnny Douglas and Percy May, Williams made 72 not out in the second innings, the highest score of the match, putting on 107 for the fifth wicket with Alf Hadden. At one stage a blow to the elbow "disabled him for some minutes", but he continued to play "an innings of outstanding courage and skill". He led New Zealand to victory by 56 runs.

When the cricket historian Tom Reese chose the best New Zealand team of all time in 1936, he named Williams as wicket-keeper. Williams also "enjoyed a high reputation as a rifle shot and as a billiards player".

== Personal life ==
Williams' first wife died in February 1903 after they had been married only 14 months. He died at Wellington in 1929 at the age of 59, survived by his second wife, Edith. An obituary was published in the 1930 edition of Wisden Cricketers' Almanack.
