= William Mills (New Zealand cricketer) =

New Zealand cricketer

Personal information
- Born: 19 March 1875; Auckland, Colony of New Zealand
- Died: 8 April 1962 (aged 87); Auckland, New Zealand

Domestic team information
- Years: Team
- 1894/95: Taranaki
- 1900/01–1903/04: Auckland

Career statistics
Competition	First-class
Matches	8
Runs scored	210
Batting average	26.25
100s/50s	0/1
Top score	55
Balls bowled	892
Wickets	28
Bowling average	14.32
5 wickets in innings	3
10 wickets in match	1
Best bowling	6/35
Catches/stumpings	7/–
- Source: ESPNcricinfo, 9 January 2017

William Mills (19 March 1875 – 8 April 1962) was a New Zealand cricketer. He played first-class cricket for Auckland and Taranaki between 1894 and 1904.

On his first-class debut Mills took 6 for 35 and 6 for 55 for Taranaki against Fiji in the last match of Fiji's tour of New Zealand in 1894–95.
