= Elliott Monfries =

Australian cricketer (1873–1954)

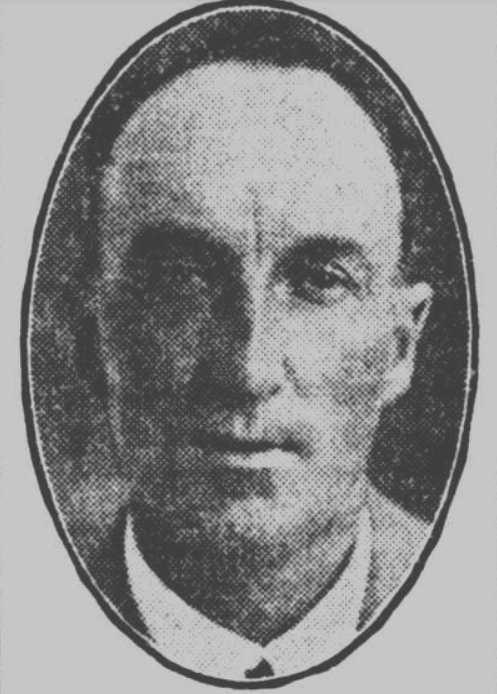

Personal information
- Full name: John Elliott Monfries
- Born: 25 December 1873; Gumeracha, Australia
- Died: 2 September 1954 (aged 80); Hobart, Australia

Domestic team information
- Years: Team
- 1903-1904: Victoria
- Source: Cricinfo, 15 November 2015

Elliott Monfries (25 December 1873 – 2 September 1954) was an Australian cricketer. He played six first-class cricket matches for Victoria between 1903 and 1904.

== See also ==
- List of Victoria first-class cricketers
