= John Mills (New Zealand cricketer) =

New Zealand cricketer

Jackie Mills

Personal information
- Born: 3 September 1905; Dunedin, Otago, New Zealand
- Died: 11 December 1972 (aged 67); Hamilton, Waikato, New Zealand
- Batting: Left-handed
- Relatives: George Mills (father)

International information
- National side: New Zealand (1930–1933)
- Test debut (cap 13): 24 January 1930 v England
- Last Test: 31 March 1933 v England

Career statistics
Competition	Test	First-class
Matches	7	97
Runs scored	241	5,025
Batting average	26.77	32.84
100s/50s	1/0	11/25
Top score	117	185
Balls bowled	0	183
Wickets	–	4
Bowling average	–	30.75
5 wickets in innings	–	0
10 wickets in match	–	0
Best bowling	–	2/57
Catches/stumpings	1/–	30/–
- Source: Cricinfo, 1 April 2017

John Ernest Mills (3 September 1905 – 11 December 1972), known as Jackie Mills, was a New Zealand cricketer who played in seven Test matches between 1930 and 1933.

== Cricket career ==
Jackie Mills's father George was an all-rounder who played for Auckland in the 1890s and 1900s and was the groundsman at Eden Park in Auckland.

A left-handed opening batsman, Mills played for Auckland from 1924–25 to 1937–38, and toured England with the New Zealand teams of 1927 and 1931, scoring over 1000 runs on each tour. In an Auckland senior club match for Eden against University in 1924–25, Mills and Hector Gillespie shared an opening stand of 441. In the first match of the 1929-30 Plunket Shield season he scored 185, his highest score, in an innings victory for Auckland over Otago. He scored more than half of Auckland's total of 356, and more than Otago's two innings combined.

He was the first New Zealander to make a Test century on debut. He scored 117 for New Zealand against England at Basin Reserve, Wellington, New Zealand, in 1929–30, and he and Stewie Dempster put on 276 for the first wicket. However, Mills's next nine Test innings produced only 124 runs.

Dick Brittenden said: "Mills, lean and graceful, never seemed sufficiently robust for the demands of test cricket; he could probably claim to be the only test batsman who habitually wore wool, from neck to ankle, next to the skin. But if his batting looked effete, it was effective. A most graceful driver and cutter, he had the left-hander's penchant for the hook. Spare and frail he was, but there was tremendous power which came from some hidden source; he was New Zealand's nearest approach to Woolley."

== Personal life ==
Mills married an English woman in London a few days before the 1931 touring team returned to New Zealand, but she did not follow him to New Zealand, and the marriage was dissolved shortly afterwards. He married again in 1957. Neither marriage produced children.

Mills worked for most of his adult life in the insurance industry. He had a high position with the Victoria Insurance Company by the time he retired in 1971. He died in Hamilton in December 1972, aged 67.
