= Frank Ashbolt =

New Zealand cricketer (1876–1940)

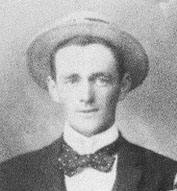

Personal information
- Full name: Frank Lionel Ashbolt
- Born: 11 April 1876; Christchurch, New Zealand
- Died: 16 July 1940 (aged 64); Wellington, New Zealand
- Batting: Right-handed
- Bowling: Right-arm leg-spin

Domestic team information
- Years: Team
- 1893/94–1900/01: Wellington

Career statistics
Competition	First-class
Matches	21
Runs scored	330
Batting average	13.75
100s/50s	0/0
Top score	37*
Balls bowled	3,527
Wickets	105
Bowling average	16.01
5 wickets in innings	11
10 wickets in match	3
Best bowling	8/58
Catches/stumpings	23/–
- Source: CricketArchive, 16 May 2017

Frank Lionel Ashbolt (11 April 1876 – 16 July 1940) was a New Zealand cricketer who played first-class cricket for Wellington from 1894 to 1901 and represented the national side in the days before New Zealand played Test cricket.

== Early life ==
Frank Ashbolt was the son of Alfred Ashbolt, who worked as the printer for The New Zealand Times and also umpired 19 first-class cricket matches from 1886 to 1898.

== Cricket career ==
A leg-spin bowler and useful lower-order batsman, Ashbolt played senior club cricket in Wellington from his early teens. In the 1891–92 season, aged 15, he twice took four wickets in four balls.

He made his first-class debut at 17 in 1893–94, taking 4 for 48 and 2 for 34 for Wellington in a one-wicket loss to Auckland. In his next match, against the touring New South Wales team three weeks later, he opened the bowling and took 6 for 52 in the first innings of a drawn match. A few weeks later, in a low-scoring victory over Hawke's Bay, he took 5 for 37 and 5 for 32, and made 30 not out at number nine (the top score of the innings) and 24 not out.

In 1894–95, Ashbolt took 7 for 61 and 5 for 41 in another low-scoring victory, this time over Otago. The next season he took seven wickets for Wellington against another New South Wales team, but he was not selected in the New Zealand team to play New South Wales a few days later.

In 1898–99 Ashbolt was a member of New Zealand's first touring team, which visited Australia in February 1899, but neither he nor the team as a whole was successful. He took his best first-class figures in 1900–01 when his 5 for 39 and 8 for 58 helped Wellington to an innings victory over Hawke's Bay.

== Later life ==
Ashbolt served in the New Zealand Expeditionary Force for four years during World War I, first in the Gallipoli Campaign and later on the Western Front.

While in London in September 1916, Ashbolt married Gladys Rhind. They lived in Wellington, and had two daughters and a son. He worked in the insurance business.

Ashbolt elder brother Alfred (1870–1930) moved to Tasmania, where he was a prominent businessman, served as Tasmania's agent-general in London, and was knighted.
