= Edgar Hawson =

Australian cricketer (1878–1946)

Personal information
- Full name: Edgar Stanley Hawson
- Born: 25 July 1878; Hobart, Tasmania, Australia
- Died: 29 September 1946 (aged 68); Hobart, Tasmania, Australia

Domestic team information
- Years: Team
- 1899-1905: Tasmania
- Source: Cricinfo, 17 January 2016

Edgar Hawson (25 July 1878 – 29 September 1946) was an Australian cricketer. He played five first-class matches for Tasmania between 1899 and 1905.

Hawson was a son of Edward Hawson (died 3 November 1925), noted Hobart businessman and a trustee of the Tasmanian Cricket Association, and his wife Mary Jane Hawson (née Smith, died 13 October 1924), who married in 1873.

Hawson married Mary A. E. Gasmier of Riverton, South Australia on 25 September 1915. Reginald James Hawson (2 September 1880 – 20 February 1928) was a brother.

== See also ==
- List of Tasmanian representative cricketers
