= Ralph Spraggon =

New Zealand cricketer

Personal information
- Full name: Ralph Dew Spraggon
- Born: 13 August 1872; Dunedin, New Zealand
- Died: 11 September 1939 (aged 67); Palmerston North, New Zealand
- Role: Batsman

Domestic team information
- Years: Team
- 1894/95–1896/97: Otago

Career statistics
| Competition | First-class |
|---|---|
| Matches | 6 |
| Runs scored | 125 |
| Batting average | 13.88 |
| 100s/50s | 0/0 |
| Top score | 40* |
| Catches/stumpings | 3/– |
- Source: Cricinfo, 8 August 2023

Ralph Dew Spraggon (13 August 1872 – 11 September 1939) was a New Zealand cricketer who played six first-class matches for the Otago between 1894 and 1897.

== Life and career ==
Spraggon was born in Dunedin but moved to England with his family as a boy. He was educated at the City of London School before returning to New Zealand, where he took a position in Dunedin as a commercial traveller for D. Benjamin & Co, importers.

Described as "a dashing batsman and a first-class fieldsman", Spraggon made his highest score of 40 not out against Canterbury in February 1897. Batting at number nine, he "hit out lustily" in a "brilliantly played innings" that helped Otago win the match after trailing in the first innings. Earlier that season, in Otago's match against the touring Australian team, his score of 36, batting at number 12 in the Otago XV, was the highest score on either side.

Spraggon was transferred by D. Benjamin & Co to Wellington in 1898. He married Maud Carnell in Napier in February 1903. Shortly afterward, he transferred to the National Provident and Friendly Societies Department in Wellington, where he worked for 20 years. After some time in Napier, where he suffered serious injuries in the 1931 Hawke's Bay earthquake, he moved to Palmerston North, working for the Labour Department. After a few months of illness, he died in Palmerston North in September 1939, aged 67, leaving a widow and their son.
