= Thomas Byrne (cricketer) =

Australian cricketer

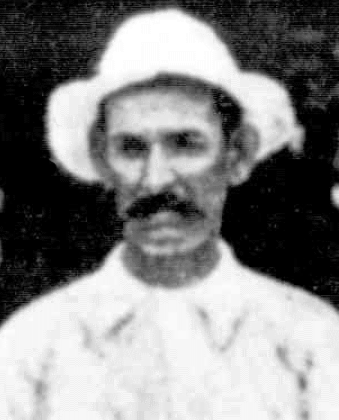

Personal information
- Born: 11 July 1866; Paterson, New South Wales, Australia
- Died: 19 December 1951 (aged 85); Herston, Queensland, Australia
- Source: Cricinfo, 1 October 2020

Thomas Byrne (11 July 1866 – 19 December 1951) was an Australian cricketer. He played in seventeen first-class matches for Queensland between 1896 and 1906.

== See also ==
- List of Queensland first-class cricketers
