= Percy May (cricketer) =

English cricketer (1884–1965)

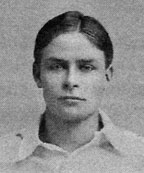

Personal information
- Full name: Percy Robert May
- Born: 13 March 1884; Chertsey, Surrey, England
- Died: 6 December 1965 (aged 81); Eastleigh, Hampshire, England
- Nickname: Phil
- Batting: Right-handed
- Bowling: Right-arm fast

Domestic team information
- Years: Team
- 1902 to 1904: London County
- 1902 to 1909: Surrey
- 1903 to 1906: Cambridge University

Career statistics
Competition	First-class
Matches	72
Runs scored	1037
Batting average	14.20
100s/50s	0/1
Top score	51 not out
Balls bowled	10,858
Wickets	247
Bowling average	24.67
5 wickets in innings	14
10 wickets in match	3
Best bowling	8/49
Catches/stumpings	36/0
- Source: Cricket Archive, 18 October 2014

Percy Robert "Phil" May (13 March 1884 – 6 December 1965) was an English cricketer who played first-class cricket from 1902 to 1910, and a final match in 1926.

== Life and career ==
May was born to Henry and Emma May in Chertsey in Surrey, where Henry worked as a butler. A fast bowler, Percy played for London County in 1902 at the age of 18, and occasionally for Surrey. After being privately educated, May went up to Pembroke College, Cambridge in the autumn of 1902.

He played cricket for the university side from 1903 to 1906, taking part in victories over Oxford University in 1905 and 1906. In 1906 he bowled unchanged throughout both innings to take 7 for 41 and 5 for 25 in Cambridge's 305-run victory over Yorkshire at Fenner's. He opened the bowling for the Gentlemen against the Players later that year, taking seven wickets, more than any other bowler. He finished the season with 75 wickets at an average of 22.76, his most successful season.

He also won a Blue at Cambridge for Association football, and toured the US with the Corinthians in 1906.

May toured New Zealand with MCC in 1906-07, taking 45 wickets in nine first-class matches at 15.97 and forming a powerful pace attack with Johnny Douglas, who took 50 wickets at 13.26. He took 5 for 53 and 5 for 37 in the first victory over Otago (by 232 runs) and 4 for 49 and 4 for 58 in the second victory (by an innings and 95 runs), and played in both matches against New Zealand, taking eight wickets. He wrote an account of the tour based on his diary, titled With the MCC in New Zealand (1907), which a New Zealand reviewer found "a very readable story ... which I was loth to put down ... the 'behind-the-scenes' life of an English amateur cricketer on tour ... makes for good and entertaining reading". Among the New Zealanders there was some question about the legitimacy of his bowling action; Dick Brittenden later described him as "a fast bowler with a peculiar leap just before delivery, and whose action was suspect".

He played a few matches in 1907, with one outstanding performance for Gentlemen of the South against Players of the South at the Hastings Festival, when he took 8 for 49 and 3 for 69 in a 233-run victory. After that he took a job as a teacher in England and played little first-class cricket.

May spent the years from 1910 to 1950 in Ceylon, managing the 2500-acre Dalkeith rubber plantation at Latpandura in the Kalutara District. He was a regular club cricketer for most of his time in Ceylon, and played in the annual match for Europeans against Ceylonese in 1911, 1912 and 1914. After suffering a shoulder injury not long after he arrived in Ceylon he was forced to abandon fast bowling and instead became a skilful underarm spin bowler and batsman. He served briefly as President of the Ceylon Cricket Association.

May married Ursula Loughnan in 1913. After they returned from Ceylon they retired to Alverstoke in Hampshire. He died in hospital at Eastleigh in December 1965.
