= Reginald Hawson =

Australian cricketer

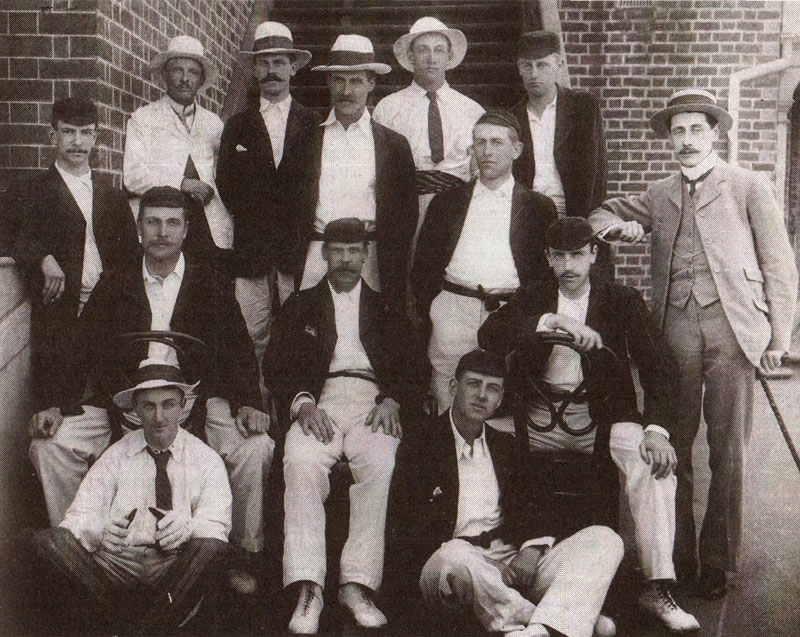
- The Tasmanian cricket team that beat Victoria at the MCG in 1902-03. Reg Hawson is standing at the far left.

Personal information
- Full name: Reginald James Hawson
- Born: 2 September 1880; Hobart, Tasmania, Australia
- Died: 20 February 1928 (aged 47); Hobart, Tasmania, Australia
- Batting: Right-handed
- Role: Batsman

Domestic team information
- Years: Team
- 1898-99 – 1913-14: Tasmania

Career statistics
Competition	First-class
Matches	27
Runs scored	1705
Batting average	37.06
100s/50s	2/7
Top score	199*
Balls bowled	342
Wickets	3
Bowling average	74.66
5 wickets in innings	0
10 wickets in match	0
Best bowling	2/42
Catches/stumpings	28/–
- Source: Cricinfo, 16 December 2020

Reginald James Hawson (2 September 1880 – 20 February 1928) was an Australian cricketer. He played 27 first-class matches for Tasmania between 1898 and 1914.

== Life and family ==
Hawson was a son of Edward Hawson (died 3 November 1925), noted Hobart businessman and a trustee of the Tasmanian Cricket Association, and his wife Mary Jane Hawson (née Smith, died 13 October 1924), who married in 1873.

He married Mabel Blundstone, daughter of John Blundstone, on 20 January 1903. Edgar Hawson (25 July 1878 – 29 September 1946) was a brother.

Hawson joined the public service in Tasmania in 1899 and became Superintendent of the New Town Infirmary in Hobart in 1914, a position he held at the time of his death in February 1928. He left a widow, two sons and three daughters.

== Cricket career ==
In his history of Tasmanian cricket, Roger Page said Hawson was "Stylish, possessing all the strokes, especially the square cut ... Besides, he was the ace slip of his time." Hawson captained Tasmania to a 54-run victory over Victoria at the Melbourne Cricket Ground in 1912–13 in which he contributed 41 and 199 not out. He also scored 139 against Victoria in Launceston in 1908–09. In the annual intrastate match between North and South in 1910-11 he scored 238 not out, captaining South to an innings victory.

== See also ==
- List of Tasmanian representative cricketers
