= Berar (ship) =

History

United Kingdom
- Name: Berar
- Owner: Tyser & Haviside
- Builder: William Pile, Sunderland
- Launched: 1863

General characteristics
- Tons burthen: 902 tons

The Berar, named after a region in western India, was a sailing ship of 902 tons, owned by Tyser & Haviside and was built in 1863 by William Pile at Sunderland.

== Trips to New Zealand ==
Initially the Berar was used to carry immigrants to Australia and New Zealand. Under charter to the Shaw Savill Company, the ship made three trips to New Zealand, two to Wellington and one to Auckland. Leaving London on 5 February 1865, she reached Wellington on 10 May, a passage of 93 days. Her next voyage was to Auckland. She left London on 22 May 1873, and reached Auckland after a passage of 103 days on 3 September. On this occasion she brought out 308 immigrants, who arrived well, in spite of that being a large number for a ship of her size.

On 18 October 1874, the Berar left London for New Zealand, arriving at Wellington 96 days later, on 22 January 1875. This trip was marred by 21 deaths due to scarlet fever. A Royal Commission of Enquiry was convened into this outbreak of disease and the consequent deaths.

== Trip to Fiji ==
The Berar arrived in Fiji on 29 June 1882 carrying 424 indentured labourers from Calcutta. This was the second indenture ship to Fiji and its journey was uneventful. This was the first ship to make use of the quarantine facilities built on the island of Nukulau.

== Destruction ==
The Berar ran aground in 1896 on the south coast of England at Culverhole Point between Axmouth and Lyme Regis and was destroyed.

== See also ==
- Indian Indenture Ships to Fiji
- Indian indenture system
- Indians in Fiji
