= Edward Windsor (cricketer) =

Australian cricketer (1869–1953)

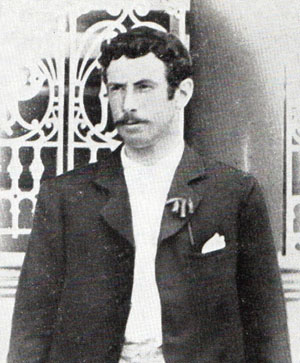

Personal information
- Full name: Edward Arthur Cartwright Windsor
- Born: 9 March 1869; Launceston, Tasmania, Australia
- Died: 23 December 1953 (aged 84); Launceston, Tasmania, Australia
- Batting: Right-handed
- Bowling: Leg break Right-arm off break Right-arm fast-medium
- Role: All-rounder

Domestic team information
- Years: Team
- 1890/91–1911/12: Tasmania

Career statistics
Competition	First-class
Matches	26
Runs scored	1,460
Batting average	32.44
100s/50s	0/11
Top score	90
Balls bowled	6,224
Wickets	129
Bowling average	29.79
5 wickets in innings	10
10 wickets in match	3
Best bowling	7/95
Catches/stumpings	9/–
- Source: Cricinfo, 2 January 2011

Edward Arthur Cartwright Windsor (9 March 1869 – 23 December 1953) was an Australian cricketer who played first-class cricket for Tasmania from the 1890–91 season until 1911–12.

Windsor was an all-rounder, a right-handed batsman who also bowled fast-medium, off-breaks and leg-breaks.
