= Herbert Fry =

Australian sportsman (1870–1953)

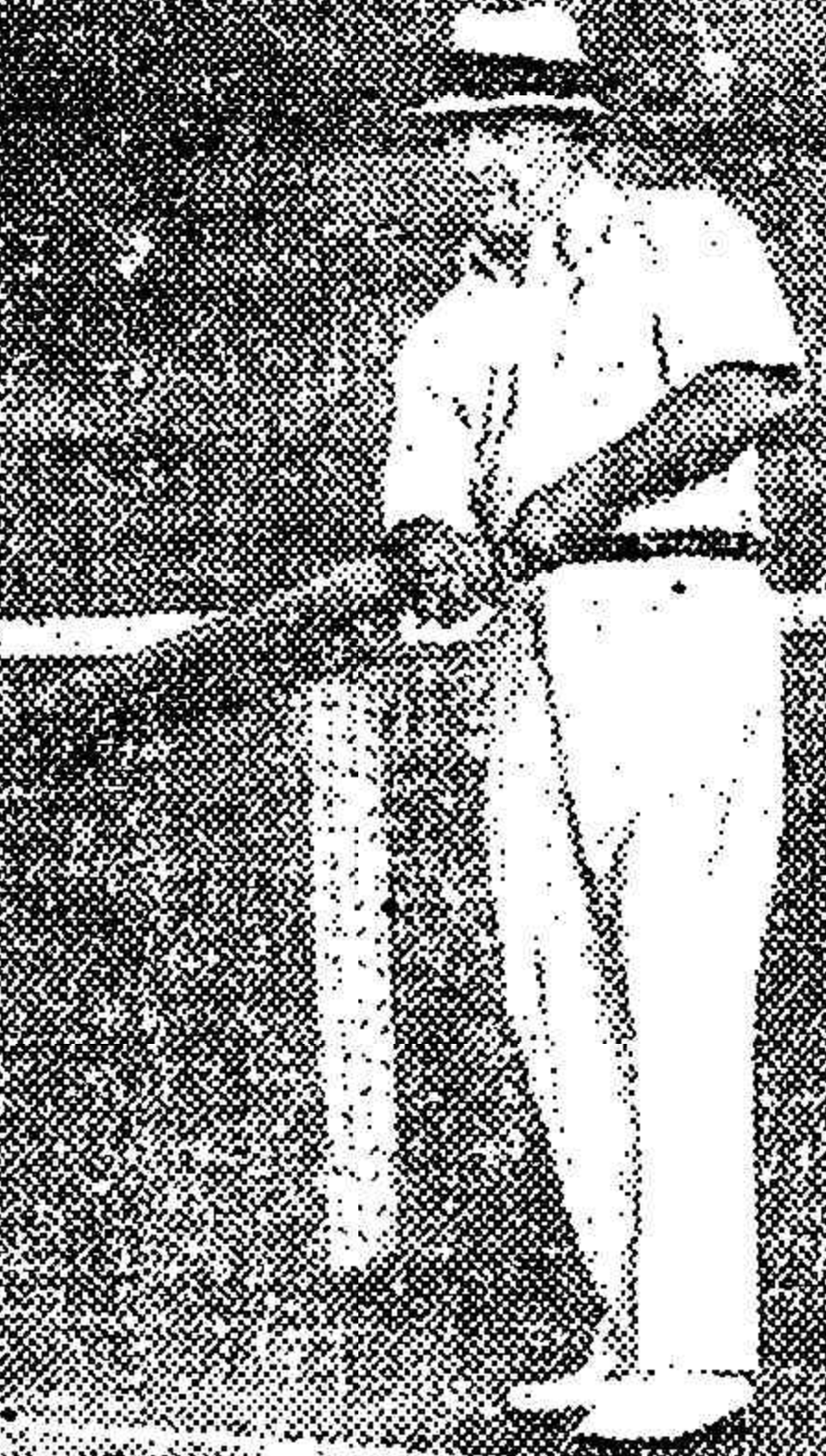
- Fry coaching in 1923

Personal information
- Full name: Herbert James Fry
- Born: 28 October 1870; Morphett Vale, South Australia
- Died: 19 January 1953 (aged 82); Hawthorn, Victoria
- Batting: Right-handed
- Bowling: Right-arm off-break
- Role: Occasional wicket-keeper

Domestic team information
- Years: Team
- 1896/97–1907/08: Victoria

Career statistics
Competition	First-class
Matches	8
Runs scored	115
Batting average	10.45
100s/50s	0/0
Top score	27
Balls bowled	372
Wickets	4
Bowling average	60.00
5 wickets in innings	0
10 wickets in match	0
Best bowling	1/24
Catches/stumpings	4/3
- Source: CricketArchive, 31 December 2014

Herbert James Fry (28 October 1870 – 19 January 1953) was an Australian sportsman who played first-class cricket for Victoria and Australian rules football with Melbourne in the Victorian Football League (VFL).

Fry played eight first-class cricket matches with Victoria, three of them in the Sheffield Shield. He also umpired a first-class match between Victoria and New Zealand in 1899. When not keeping wicket, Fry bowled right arm off-break and took 4 wickets at 60.00 during his career. The biggest name out of his four scalps was Marylebone Cricket Club captain Plum Warner, whom he dismissed at the Melbourne Cricket Ground in 1904.

In his brief VFL career at Melbourne, Fry was used as a ruckman. He played five games in the league's inaugural season in 1897, including Melbourne's historic first VFL match and their losing semi final. His sixth and last senior game came in the opening round of 1898 before he injured his knee and was forced to retire.
