= William Claxton (cricketer) =

Australian cricketer

Personal information
- Born: 2 June 1857; Kensington, South Australia
- Died: 12 March 1937 (aged 79); Glenelg, South Australia
- Source: Cricinfo, 4 June 2018

William Claxton (2 June 1857 – 12 March 1937) was an Australian cricketer. He played two first-class matches for South Australia between 1883 and 1896.

== See also ==
- List of South Australian representative cricketers
