= Alexander Downes =

New Zealand cricketer (1868–1950)

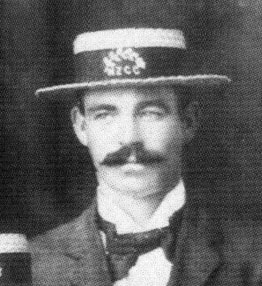

Personal information
- Full name: Alexander Dalziel Downes
- Born: 2 February 1868; Emerald Hill, Victoria, Australia
- Died: 10 February 1950 (aged 82); Dunedin, New Zealand
- Batting: Right-handed
- Bowling: Right-arm off-spin

International information
- National side: New Zealand

Domestic team information
- Years: Team
- 1887/88–1913/14: Otago

Career statistics
Competition	First-class
Matches	51
Runs scored	882
Batting average	10.62
100s/50s	0/1
Top score	63
Balls bowled	12,360
Wickets	311
Bowling average	14.67
5 wickets in innings	33
10 wickets in match	13
Best bowling	8/35
Catches/stumpings	31/0
- Source: CricketArchive, 25 September 2014

Alexander Dalziel Downes (2 February 1868 – 10 February 1950 in Dunedin, Otago) was a noted sportsman at rugby and cricket, at which he represented New Zealand. He was born at Emerald Hill in Melbourne, Australia in 1868.

== Sporting career ==
Alec Downes played 51 first-class matches and took 311 wickets in his cricket career.

He played for Alhambra Rugby Football Club in 1884, appearing in their inaugural senior team of 1887 and representing the club until 1893. He represented Otago on 13 occasions between 1887 and 1893, and the South Island in 1888 against A. E. Stoddart's English team. In 1897 he was made a life member of Alhambra.

However, it was at cricket that he achieved his best and by 1894 Downes was being described as the best bowler in New Zealand. For Otago he bowled right-arm with a great variety of pace, a big off-break and a fine length. Downes's bowling record was nothing short of remarkable, especially in Dunedin. Of the 28 matches that he played there for Otago he took 10 or more wickets in a match on 13 occasions. His career bests for an innings were 8 for 35 against Canterbury in 1891–92 and 14 for 103 in a match against Hawke's Bay in 1893–94. He also recorded the unique feat in New Zealand first-class cricket of taking four wickets in four consecutive balls against Auckland in January 1894 on Carisbrook Ground. He played for Grange Cricket Club and Albion Cricket Club. He missed many of Otago's away matches, as he was unable to obtain leave from his work for the travel; of his 51 first-class matches over 26 years, only two were in the North Island.

In retirement he remained active in sport as a rugby union referee and cricket umpire up to inter-provincial and international levels.

== Personal life ==
His family emigrated to Dunedin, New Zealand, in about 1870. In 1882 he began work as a brass-finisher for A. & T. Burt, retiring in 1945. In 1887 he joined the Dunedin City Fire Brigade as an auxiliary fireman, and remained a member for most of his adult life.

He died at Dunedin in 1950 and was survived by four daughters and three sons, and by his wife, who died on 7 June 1955 at the age of 86.
