= Arthur Fisher (New Zealand cricketer) =

New Zealand cricketer

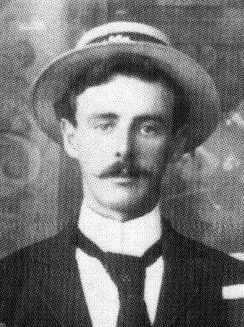
- Arthur Fisher in about 1898

Personal information
- Full name: Arthur Hadfield Fisher
- Born: 11 February 1871; Nelson, New Zealand
- Died: 23 March 1961 (aged 90); Dunedin, New Zealand
- Batting: Right-handed
- Bowling: Left-arm medium

International information
- National side: New Zealand

Domestic team information
- Years: Team
- 1890/91–1909/10: Otago

Career statistics
| Competition | First-class |
|---|---|
| Matches | 46 |
| Runs scored | 1,079 |
| Batting average | 14.98 |
| 100s/50s | 0/4 |
| Top score | 76 |
| Balls bowled | 8,326 |
| Wickets | 197 |
| Bowling average | 16.38 |
| 5 wickets in innings | 11 |
| 10 wickets in match | 1 |
| Best bowling | 9/50 |
| Catches/stumpings | 26/0 |
- Source: Cricinfo, 17 September 2014

Arthur Hadfield Fisher (11 February 1871 – 23 March 1961) was a New Zealand cricketer, golfer and businessman.

== Life and career ==
Fisher was born at Nelson, New Zealand, and was educated at Otago Boys' High School in Dunedin and Waitaki Boys' High School in Oamaru. An accurate left-arm medium-pace swing bowler, he played for Otago from 1890–91 to 1909–10, taking 197 wickets at an average of 16.38. He was also a useful lower-order batsman and a brilliant fielder.

Against a touring Queensland cricket team in 1896–97 Fisher took 9 for 50 in the first innings, which is still an Otago record for innings bowling figures. Later that season he took 7 for 11 to dismiss Canterbury for 46, bowling three batsmen in the space of four balls in his second over.

Fisher represented New Zealand, in the days before New Zealand had Test status, in matches against Australian and English teams. The Australians were so impressed with his bowling on their tour of New Zealand in 1896 that they invited him to try out for the Australian Test team in 1897–98. He went to Melbourne and practised there, but was unable to reproduce his New Zealand form on the harder Australian pitches, and was not selected in the Australian team. Against the touring MCC side in Wellington in 1906–07, he took 4 for 25 and 5 for 61 in a 56-run victory for New Zealand.

Fisher won the New Zealand Amateur golf championship in 1904, beating George MacEwan 3&2 in the final. He had been Otago champion the previous year.

Fisher worked for the Standard Fire and Marine Insurance Company for 60 years. In 1912 he became the company's general manager, and he remained in that position until he retired in 1947.

== Personal life ==
On 15 December 1896, at St Peter's Anglican Church in the Dunedin suburb of Caversham, Fisher married Janet Graeme Rollo Brodrick. Following her death on 23 September 1928, he married Elizabeth Charlotte Farrant in the same church on 16 December 1930. There were no children of either marriage. Elizabeth died on 15 December 1957 and Arthur died in Dunedin on 23 March 1961, aged 90.
