= Alfred Holdship =

New Zealand cricketer

Personal information
- Full name: Alfred Richardson Holdship
- Born: 15 October 1867; Auckland, New Zealand
- Died: 28 January 1923 (aged 55); Sydney, Australia
- Batting: Right-handed

Career statistics
| Competition | First-class |
|---|---|
| Matches | 21 |
| Runs scored | 801 |
| Batting average | 23.55 |
| 100s/50s | 0/7 |
| Top score | 79 |
| Balls bowled | 872 |
| Wickets | 15 |
| Bowling average | 26.00 |
| 5 wickets in innings | 0 |
| 10 wickets in match | 0 |
| Best bowling | 3/6 |
| Catches/stumpings | 15/– |
- Source: CricketArchive, 14 March 2014

Alfred Richardson Holdship (15 October 1867 – 28 January 1923) was a New Zealand cricketer who played first-class cricket from 1893 to 1899. He was the second captain of the New Zealand cricket team.

== Education ==
Born in Auckland, Holdship was sent to England for his education, first to Cheltenham College, where he played cricket in the First XI, then to Caius College, Cambridge University. He received a BA degree, then studied law at the Inner Temple in London, was called to the Bar in 1892, and returned to New Zealand to practise law in Wellington.

== Cricket career ==
A stylish batsman with a wide range of shots, a brilliant fieldsman and an occasional bowler, Holdship made his first-class debut in December 1893, captaining Wellington against Auckland. In the return match in January he made 70, the highest score on either side. In February he played in New Zealand's first international match, against the touring New South Wales team.

He continued to captain Wellington. When New South Wales returned in 1895-96 he captained New Zealand to their first victory. He played again for New Zealand, but not as captain, in 1896–97, this time against Queensland, when he made the side's top score of 69 in another victory.

Holdship made the highest score of his career, 79, also the highest score in the match, when he captained Wellington to an innings victory over Canterbury in 1897–98. His last match was against Canterbury in 1898–99, when he once again made Wellington's highest score, 65, but was unable to avert an innings defeat.

== Later life ==
After his cricket career, Holdship practised in Wanganui for about 10 years before moving to Australia. In 1914 he was admitted to the Bar in Sydney, where he and his brother established the legal firm Messrs Holdship and Holdship. He died in Sydney aged 55, survived by his wife Maude.
