= 1934 in New Zealand =

- Decades: 1910s; 1920s; 1930s; 1940s; 1950s
- See also: History of New Zealand; List of years in New Zealand; Timeline of New Zealand history

The following lists events that happened during 1934 in New Zealand.

== Population ==
- Estimated population as of 31 December: 1,558,400.
- Increase since previous 31 December 1933: 11,300 (0.73%).
- Males per 100 females: 103.3.

== Incumbents ==
=== Regal and viceregal ===
- Head of State – George V
- Governor-General – The Lord Bledisloe GCMG KBE PC

=== Government ===
The 24th New Zealand Parliament continued with the coalition of the United Party and the Reform Party; which postponed the next general election from 1934 to 1935.

- Speaker of the House – Charles Statham (Independent)
- Prime Minister – George Forbes
- Minister of Finance – Gordon Coates (Reform Party)
- Minister of Foreign Affairs – George Forbes
- Attorney-General – George Forbes
- Chief Justice — Sir Michael Myers

=== Parliamentary opposition ===
- Leader of the Opposition – Michael Joseph Savage (Labour Party).

=== Main centre leaders ===
- Mayor of Auckland – George Hutchison
- Mayor of Wellington – Thomas Hislop
- Mayor of Christchurch – Dan Sullivan
- Mayor of Dunedin – Edwin Thomas Cox

== Events ==
- 6 February: Treaty house and grounds at Waitangi dedicated as a national reserve.
- 5 March: A magnitude 7.6 earthquake strikes Pahiatua, Manawatu-Wanganui, at 11.46pm.
- 28 June: Third session of the 24th Parliament commences.
- 10 November: Third session of the 24th Parliament concludes.
- Banknotes issued by the new Reserve Bank replace those issued by the Trading Banks, see New Zealand pound.
- Charles Ulm, in Faith in Australia, flies the first official airmail from New Zealand to Australia.

== Arts and literature ==
See 1934 in art, 1934 in literature, Category:1934 books

=== Music ===
See: 1934 in music

=== Radio ===
See: Public broadcasting in New Zealand

=== Film ===
See: Category:1934 film awards, 1934 in film, List of New Zealand feature films, Cinema of New Zealand, Category:1934 films

== Sport ==
=== British Empire Games ===
Gold	Silver	Bronze	Total
1	0	2	3

=== Chess ===
- The 43rd National Chess Championship was held in Dunedin, and was won by John Dunlop, of Dunedin, his fourth title.

=== Golf ===
- The 24th New Zealand Open championship was won by Andrew Shaw, his 6th title.
- The 38th National Amateur Championships were held in Wanganui
  - Men: B. M. Silk (Wanganui)
  - Women: Miss B. Gaisford – her second title.

=== Horse racing ===
==== Harness racing ====
- New Zealand Trotting Cup – Indianapolis
- Auckland Trotting Cup – Roi L'Or

=== Lawn bowls ===
The national outdoor lawn bowls championships are held in Dunedin.

- Men's singles champion – W. Carswell (Taieri Bowling Club)
- Men's pair champions – J. McPherson, J. Veitch (skip) (West Harbour Bowling Club)
- Men's fours champions – G. Dickson, F. Redpath, H.F. Gibson, H. Wilson (skip) (Linwood Bowling Club)

=== Rugby ===
Category:Rugby union in New Zealand, Category:All Blacks

- the Bledisloe Cup was won by Australia, with one win and one draw.
- The Ranfurly Shield changed hands twice: Canterbury lost their first defence to Hawkes Bay 0–9. Hawkes Bay defended the shield against Wanganui 39–16 and Taranaki 23–8 before losing it to Auckland 14–18.

=== Rugby league ===
New Zealand national rugby league team

=== Soccer ===
- The Chatham Cup is won by Auckland Thistle who beat Christchurch Thistle 2–1 in the final.
- Provincial league champions:
  - Auckland: Thistle
  - Canterbury: Thistle
  - Hawke's Bay: Napier YMCA
  - Nelson: YMCA
  - Otago: King Edward Technical College Old Boys
  - Southland: Southern
  - Taranaki: Stratford
  - Waikato: Huntly Starr Utd
  - Wanganui: Thistle
  - Wellington: Marist

== Births ==
=== January ===
- 3 January – Bob Elliott, paediatrician (died 2020)
- 6 January – Harry M. Miller, entertainment promoter and publicist (died 2018)
- 11 January – Barrie West, naval officer
- 22 January – Graham Kerr, television cook
- 26 January – Rex Percy, rugby union and rugby league player (died 2015)

=== February ===
- 4 February – Donal Smith, athlete (died 2023)
- 6 February – Barry Magee, athlete
- 7 February – Ossie Butt, rugby league player (died 2002)
- 10 February – Fleur Adcock, poet and editor (died 2024)
- 26 February – Kara Puketapu, public servant and Maori leader (died 2023)

=== March ===
- 3 March – Lindsay Townsend, rugby union player (died 2020)
- 15 March – Wally Hughes, association football player and coach (died 2011)
- 16 March
  - Ian McLean, politician
  - Des Townson, yacht designer (died 2008)
- 17 March – Ian Barker, jurist (died 2022)
- 20 March
  - Graeme Hansen, equestrian (died 2007)
  - Ralph Maxwell, politician (died 2012)
- 26 March
  - Harle Freeman-Greene, diplomat
  - Matiu Rata, politician (died 1997)
- 31 March – Randall Carrington, cricketer (died 2018)

=== April ===
- 3 April – Pamela Allen, children's writer and illustrator
- 9 April – Bill Birch, politician
- 14 April – Duncan MacRae, rugby league player (died 2019)
- 21 April – Martin Horton, cricket player and coach (died 2011)
- 24 April – Olaf Keil, musician (died 2022)
- 28 April – James Flynn, intelligence researcher, politician (died 2020)
- 30 April – Tom Coughlan, rugby union player (died 2017)

=== May ===
- 1 May
  - Nev MacEwan, rugby union player
  - Apirana Mahuika, Ngāti Porou leader (died 2015)
- 8 May
  - Graeme Lowans, cricketer (died 2014)
  - Gordon Ogilvie, historian and biographer (died 2017)
- 12 May – Peter Bland, poet, actor
- 15 May – Frank McAtamney, rugby union player (died 2022)
- 16 May – Roy Kerr, mathematician
- 21 May – Guy Henderson, oboist (died 2013)
- 28 May – Bill Baillie, athlete (died 2018)
- 30 May
  - Mel Cooke, rugby league player (died 2013)
  - Peter Dronke, medievalist (died 2020)

=== June ===
- 5 June
  - Ashley Lawrence, conductor (died 1990)
  - Margaret Stuart, athlete (died 1999)
- 8 June – David Abbott, cricket umpire (died 2016)
- 11 June – John da Silva, wrestler, boxer (died 2021)
- 13 June – Mel Brieseman, public health official, missionary (died 2010)
- 19 June – Arthur Candy, cyclist (died 2019)

=== July ===
- 12 July – Tuna Scanlan, boxer (died 2014)
- 15 July – Noel Hobson, field hockey player
- 19 July – Tessa Birnie, concert pianist (died 2008)
- 22 July
  - Sam Chaffey, alpine skier, businessman (died 1998)
  - Neville Denton, rugby league player and coach (died 2015)
- 25 July – Peter Skelton, cricketer (died 2009)
- 27 July – Robin Leamy, Roman Catholic bishop (died 2022)
- 31 July – Roger Urbahn, rugby union player, cricketer, sports journalist (died 1984)

=== August ===
- 1 August – John Beck, cricketer (died 2000)
- 6 August – Dave Gillespie, rugby union player
- 9 August – Kevin Laidlaw, rugby union player (died 2024)
- 20 August – Patricia Buckfield, paediatrician and neonatologist (died 1995)
- 21 August
  - Ruth Butterworth, political scientist (died 2020)
  - Ann Verdcourt, potter (died 2022)
- 24 August
  - Tony Campbell, biblical scholar (died 2020)
  - John Waddingham, cricketer
- 29 August – John Guy, cricketer

=== September ===
- 2 September
  - Leslie Butler, cricketer (died 2006)
  - Colin Knight, educationalist (died 2016)
- 6 September – Alison Roxburgh, women's rights advocate, community leader (died 2020)
- 8 September – Ross Brown, rugby union player (died 2014)
- 9 September
  - Eugene Paykel, psychiatrist (died 2023)
  - John Wallace, jurist (died 2012)
  - Roy Williams, decathlete
- 10 September
  - John Abrams, field hockey player
  - Des Webb, rugby union player (died 1987)
- 11 September – Evon Dickson, cricketer (died 2012)
- 14 September – Paul Little, rugby union player (died 1993)
- 16 September – Anne Gambrill, lawyer and judge (died 2026)
- 19 September – Austin Mitchell, journalist, politician (died 2021)
- 25 September – Allan Potts, athlete, athletics coach and administrator (died 2014)
- 29 September – Bob Parker, rower (died 2009)

=== October ===
- 1 October – Teupoko'ina Utanga Morgan, teacher, politician, author (died 2007)
- 4 October – Joe Williams, physician, politician (died 2020)
- 8 October – Jean Coulston, cricketer (died 2001)
- 12 October – Maurice Langdon, cricketer
- 18 October – Allan Wilson, biochemist (died 1991)
- 20 October – Leo Close, Paralympic sportsman and sports organiser (died 1977)
- 22 October – Donald McIntyre, opera singer (died 2025)
- 28 October – Brian Davis, Anglican archbishop (died 1998)
- 29 October – George Cuthill, association footballer
- 31 October – Don Aickin, obstetrician and gynaecologist (died 2019)

=== November ===
- 1 November – Les Mills, athlete, politician
- 11 November – Peter Snow, physician (died 2006)
- 12 November – Peter Wilkinson, politician (died 1987)
- 13 November – Peter Arnett, TV journalist, Pulitzer Prize winner (died 2025)

=== December ===
- 1 December – Peter Williams, lawyer, penal reform advocate (died 2015)
- 6 December – Johnny Hanks, boxer (died 2013)
- 11 December
  - Tom Hadfield, rugby league player (died 2018)
  - Ross McNabb, mycologist (died 1972)
- 16 December – Mel Dunne, rugby union player, cricketer, civil engineer (died 2002)
- 25 December – John Shrapnell, journalist, actor, singer (died 2020)
- 26 December – Don Hunn, diplomat and public servant
- 27 December – Ron Ackland, rugby league player and coach (died 2013)
- 28 December – Bob Skelton, jockey (died 2016)
- 30 December
  - Barry Briggs, speedway rider
  - Eddie Tonks, rugby union administrator (died 2020)

=== Undated ===
- Gillian Cowlishaw, anthropologist
- Gil Hanly, artist
- Leo McKendry, politician
- Norma Restieaux, cardiologist
- Tepaeru Tereora, artist, Cook Islands Māori language advocate
- Ted Thomas, jurist

== Deaths ==
=== January–February ===
- 6 January – Hikapuhi, Ngāti Pikiao tohunga (born c. 1871)
- 7 January – Alfred West, rugby union player (born 1893)
- 9 January – George Smailes, politician, clergyman (born 1862)
- 10 January – Lawrence Grace, politician (born 1854)
- 18 January – Jessie Aitken, community worker, political activist (born 1867)
- 20 January – Joseph Lawton, cricket player and coach (born 1857)
- 27 January – Spencer Gollan, rower, golfer (born 1860)
- 31 January – Duncan Sommerville, mathematician and astronomer (born 1879)
- 8 February– Herbert Izard, Anglican clergyman (born 1869)
- 15 February – John Fletcher, businessman, politician (born 1888)
- 22 February
  - Rosetta Baume, feminist, community leader (born 1871)
  - George Witters, conservationist (born 1876)

=== March–April ===
- 5 March – Sir Arthur Dobson, surveyor, engineer, explorer (born 1841)
- 12 March – Fanny Osborne, botanical illustrator (born 1852)
- 31 March – James Mackintosh Bell, geologist, writer (born 1877)
- 5 April – Thomas Davey, politician (born 1856)
- 9 April – John Charles Thomson, politician (born 1866)
- 11 April
  - Harry Beswick, politician (born 1860)
  - Sir Edwin Mitchelson, politician (born 1846)
  - Alexander Peebles, politician (born 1856)
- 29 April – Bert Pither, cyclist, aviation experimenter (born 1871)
- 30 April – James Testro, cricketer (born 1851)

=== May–June ===
- 5 May – Ann O'Donnell, hotel proprietor (born c. 1858)
- 6 May
  - William McGirr, cricketer (born 1859)
  - Sir Henry Wigram, businessman, politician, aviation pioneer (born 1857)
- 14 May – George Fowler, cricketer (born 1860)
- 26 May – John Anderson, rugby union player, engineer, politician (born 1849)
- 2 June – David Ashby, cricketer (born 1852)
- 7 June
  - William Vorrath, cricketer, rugby league player (born 1904)
  - George Webbe, cricketer (born 1856)
- 9 June – John Joseph Woods, composer of "God Defend New Zealand" (born 1849)
- 13 June – Guy Thornton, army chaplain (born 1872)
- 14 June – Walter Empson, schoolteacher (born 1856)
- 15 July – George Anson, cricketer, physician (born 1850)
- 17 June – William Triggs, journalist, newspaper editor, politician (born 1855)
- 27 June – Harry Ell, politician, conservationist (born 1862)

=== July–August ===
- 1 July – Frederick William Ward, journalist and newspaper editor (born 1847)
- 2 July – Arthur Plugge, army officer (born 1877)
- 6 July – Thomas Pettit, businessman, politician (born 1858)
- 8 July – Leonard Cockayne, botanist (born 1855)
- 10 July – Andrew Walker, politician (born 1855)
- 13 July – Kate Sheppard, suffragist (born 1848)
- 16 July
  - Walter Bennett, politician (born 1864)
  - Carlo Bergamini, sculptor (born 1868)
- 18 July – Herbert Fenwick, cricketer (born 1861)
- 20 July – William Alfred Bayly, convicted murderer (born 1906)
- 3 August – Allan Johnson, Anglican clergyman (born 1871)
- 10 August – Sally Low, social reformer and peace campaigner (born 1876)
- 11 August – William Collins, surgeon, politician, rugby union player, cricketer (born 1853)
- 12 August – James Glasgow, cricketer (born 1934)
- 17 August – Sir George Fowlds, politician (born 1860)

=== September–October ===
- 2 September – James Allan, rugby union player (born 1860)
- 4 September – Tini Taiaroa, community worker (born c. 1846)
- 5 September – John Joseph Dougall, politician (born 1860)
- 13 September – Sir John Roberts, businessman, politician (born 1845)
- 14 September – Robert Loughnan, journalist, politician (born 1841)
- 21 September – Hugh Stewart, soldier, historian (born 1884)
- 30 September – Joseph Butler, timber merchant (born 1862)
- 9 October – Roderick McKenzie, politician (born 1852)
- 20 October – Arthur Blacklock, cricketer (born 1868)

=== November–December ===
- 2 November – Alexander Don, Presbyterian missionary (born 1857)
- 8 November – Arthur Eastwood, jockey, rowing coxswain (born 1905)
- 19 November – Charles Wilson, politician (born 1862)
- 25 November – Eliza Anscombe, painter (born 1872)
- 2 December – Horace Packe, Anglican clergyman (born 1865)
- 8 December – Robert Brown, cricketer (born 1850)
- 10 December – Margaret Stoddart, botanical artist (born 1865)
- 22 December – Robert Davenport, cricketer (born 1852)
- 29 December – Sir Arthur Fell, politician (born 1850)

== See also ==
- History of New Zealand
- List of years in New Zealand
- Military history of New Zealand
- Timeline of New Zealand history
- Timeline of New Zealand's links with Antarctica
- Timeline of the New Zealand environment
