= 2013 in New Zealand =

- Decades: 1990s; 2000s; 2010s; 2020s
- See also: History of New Zealand; List of years in New Zealand; Timeline of New Zealand history

The following events happened in New Zealand in the year 2013.

== Population ==
National

Estimated populations as at 30 June.

- New Zealand total – 4,442,100
- North Island – 3,398,700
- South Island – 1,042,800

Main urban areas

Estimated populations as at 30 June.

- Auckland – 1,381,800
- Christchurch – 369,200
- Dunedin – 115,100
- Gisborne – 35,200
- Hamilton – 214,800
- Invercargill – 49,300
- Kapiti – 40,700
- Napier-Hastings – 127,600
- Nelson – 63,300
- New Plymouth – 54,800
- Palmerston North – 81,500
- Rotorua – 55,800
- Tauranga – 125,700
- Wellington – 389,600
- Whanganui – 39,300
- Whangārei – 53,600

== Incumbents ==
=== Regal and vice-regal ===
- Head of State – Elizabeth II
- Governor-General – Jerry Mateparae
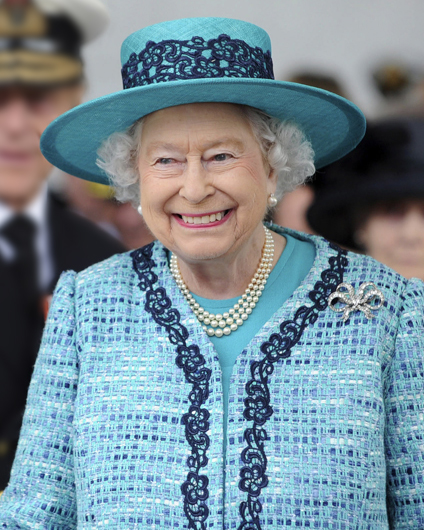
Elizabeth II

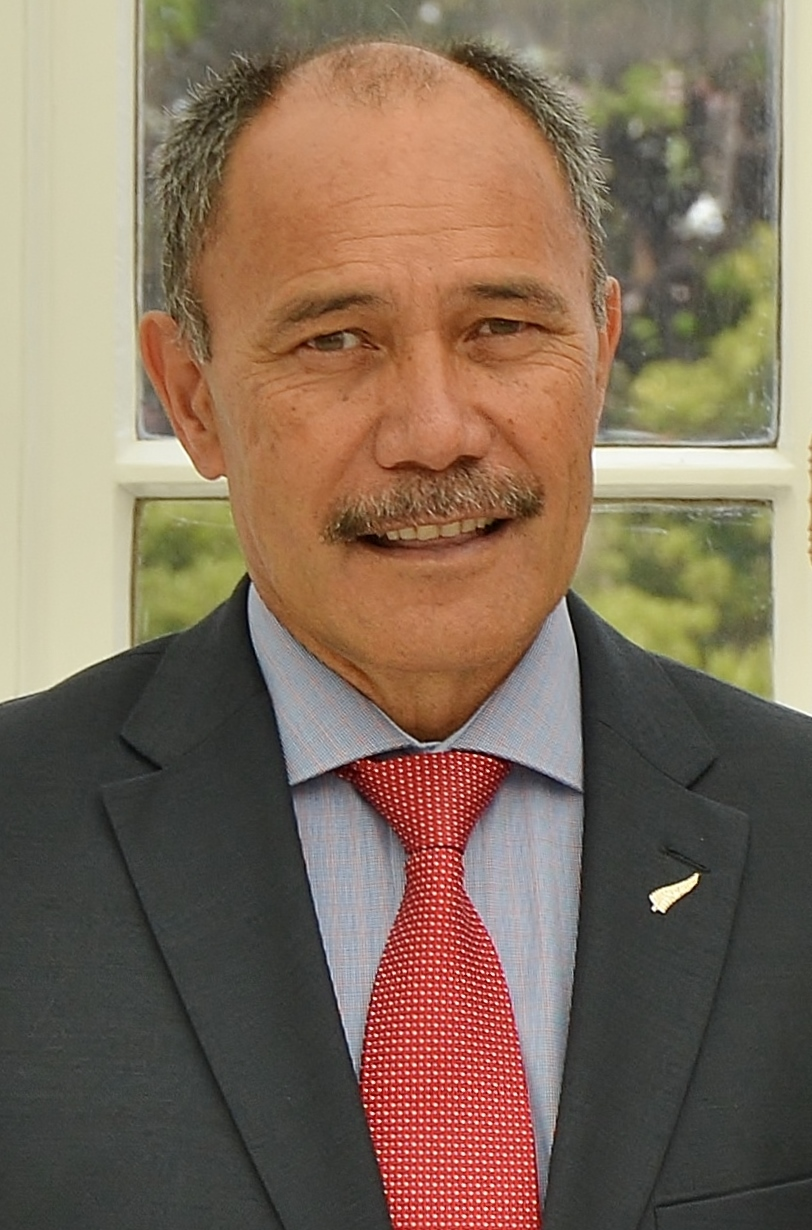
Jerry Mateparae

=== Government ===
2013 is the second full year of the 50th Parliament, which first sat on 20 December 2011 and will dissolve on 17 December 2014 if not dissolved prior. The Fifth National Government, first elected in 2008, continues.

- Speaker of the House – Lockwood Smith to 31 January, then David Carter
- Prime Minister – John Key
- Deputy Prime Minister – Bill English
- Leader of the House – Gerry Brownlee
- Minister of Finance – Bill English
- Minister of Foreign Affairs – Murray McCully
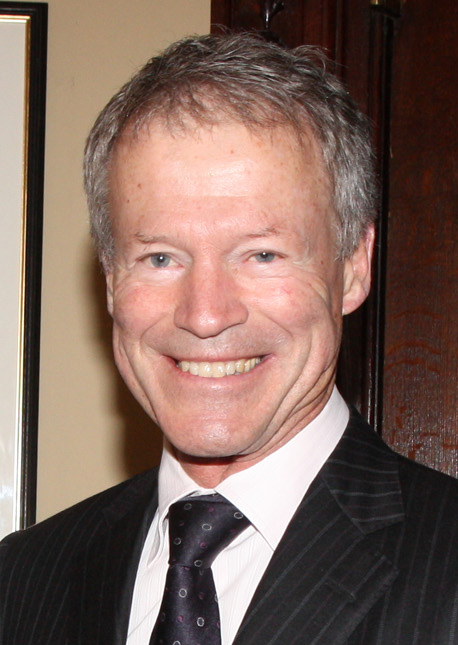
Lockwood Smith

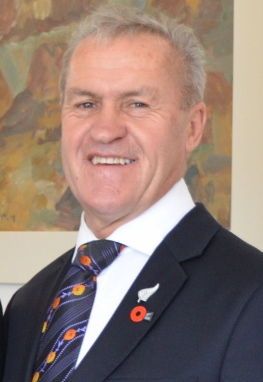
David Carter

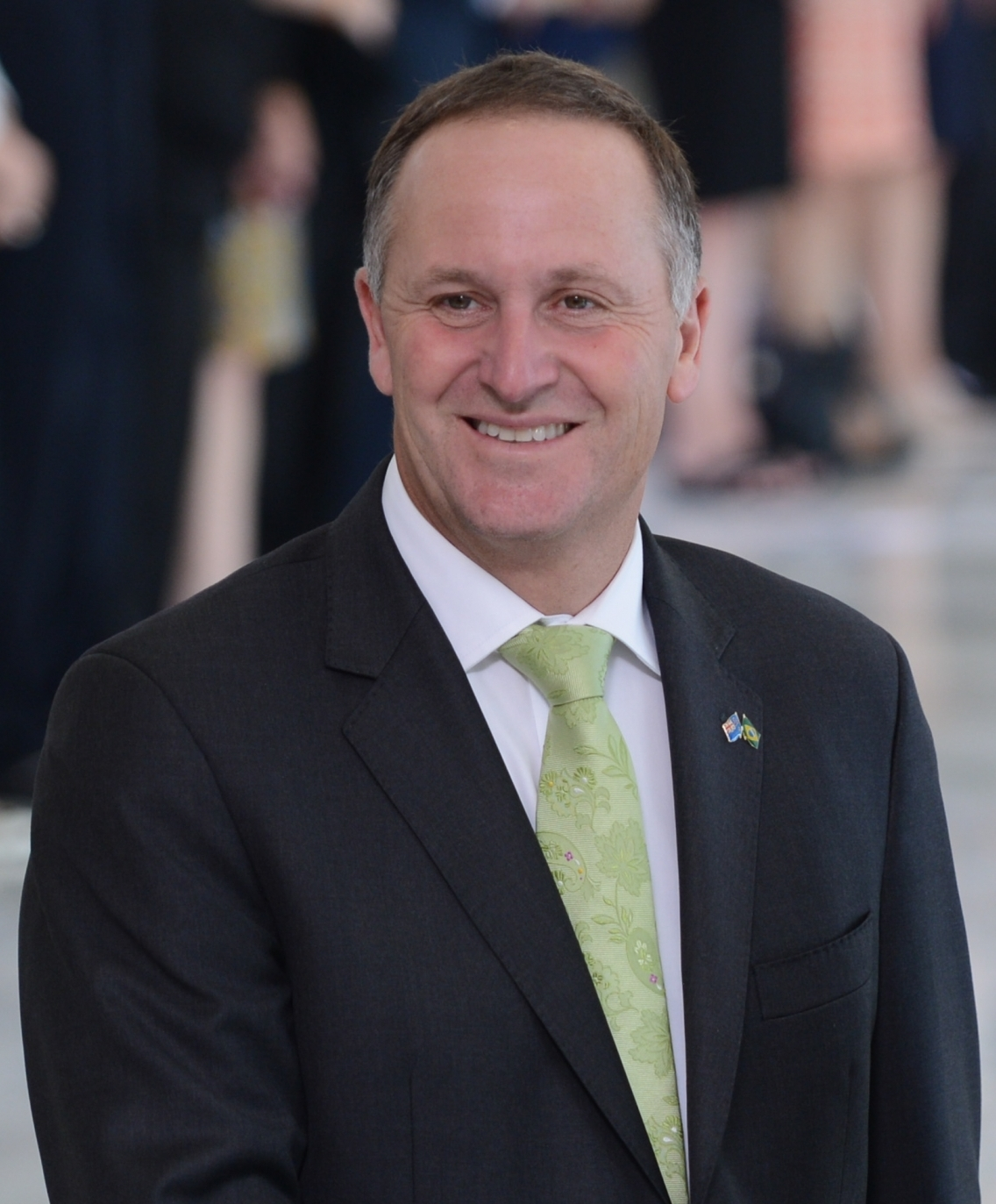
John Key

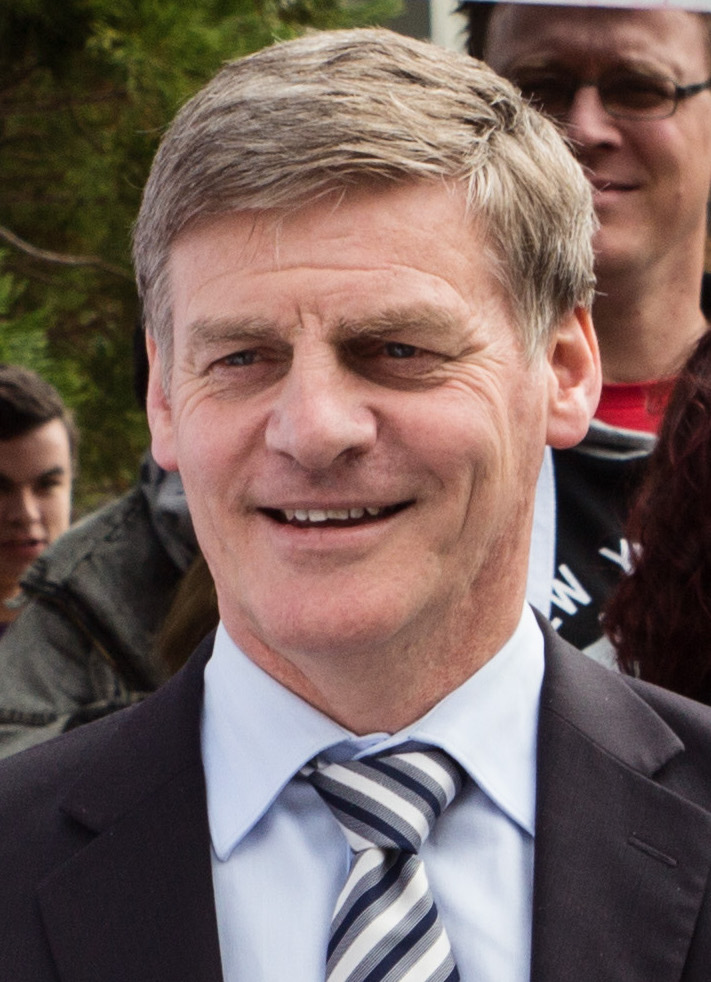
Bill English

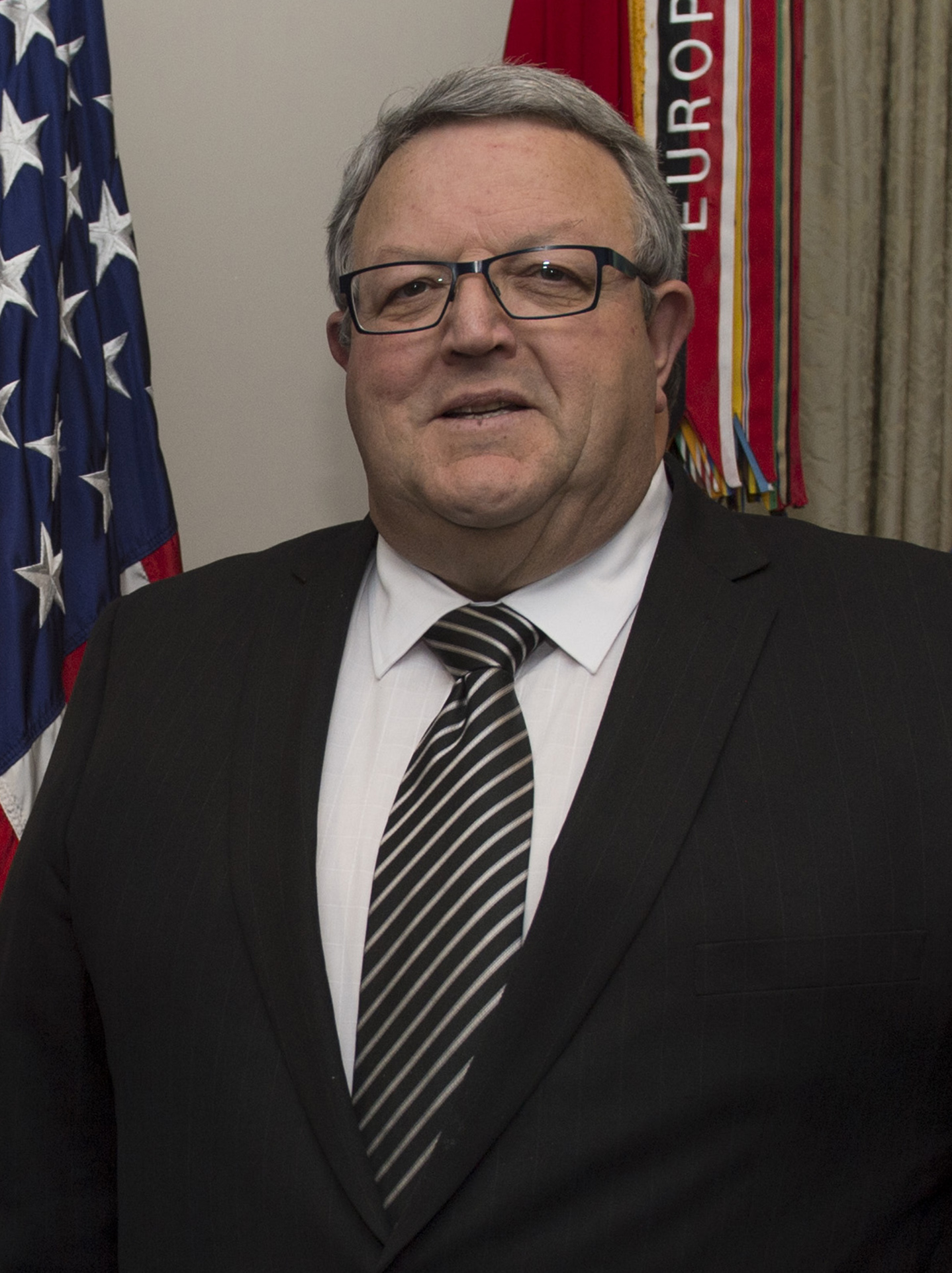
Gerry Brownlee

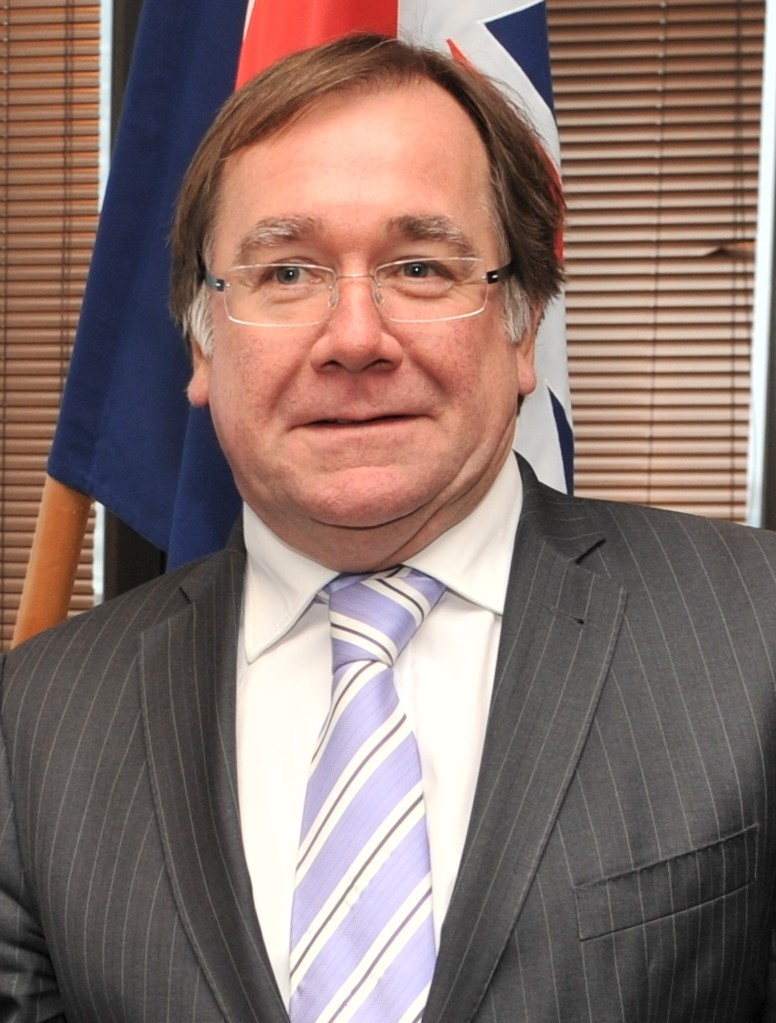
Murray McCully

=== Other Party leaders ===
- Labour – David Shearer to 15 September then David Cunliffe
- Green – Russel Norman and Metiria Turei
- New Zealand First – Winston Peters
- Māori Party – Pita Sharples to 13 July then Te Ururoa Flavell, and Tariana Turia
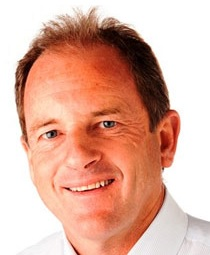
David Shearer

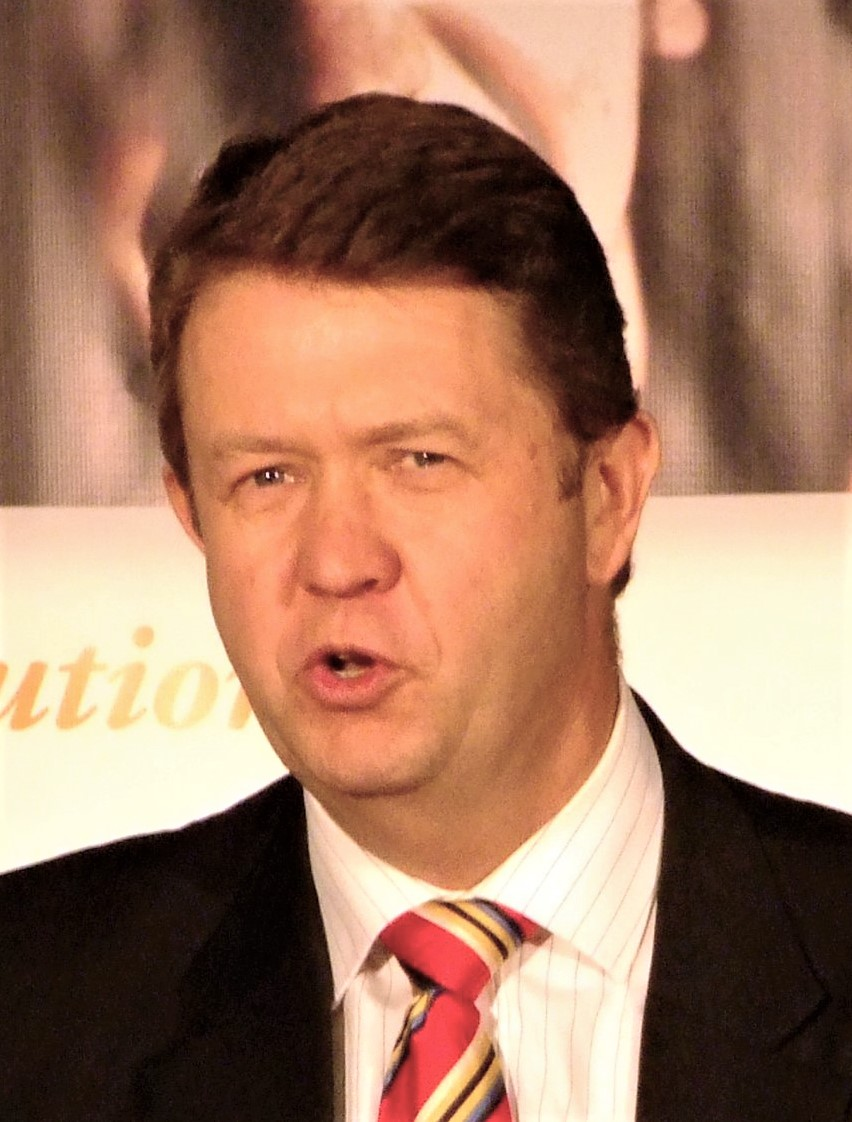
David Cunliffe

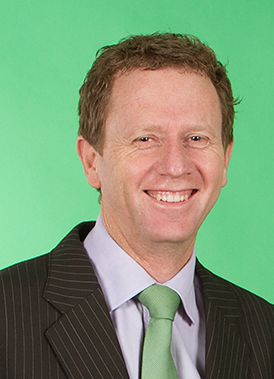
Russel Norman

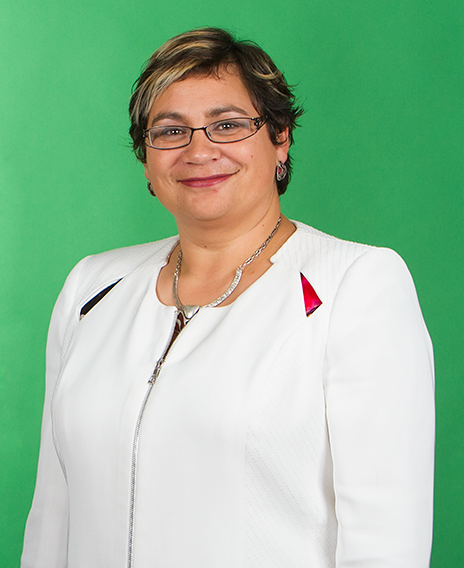
Metiria Turei

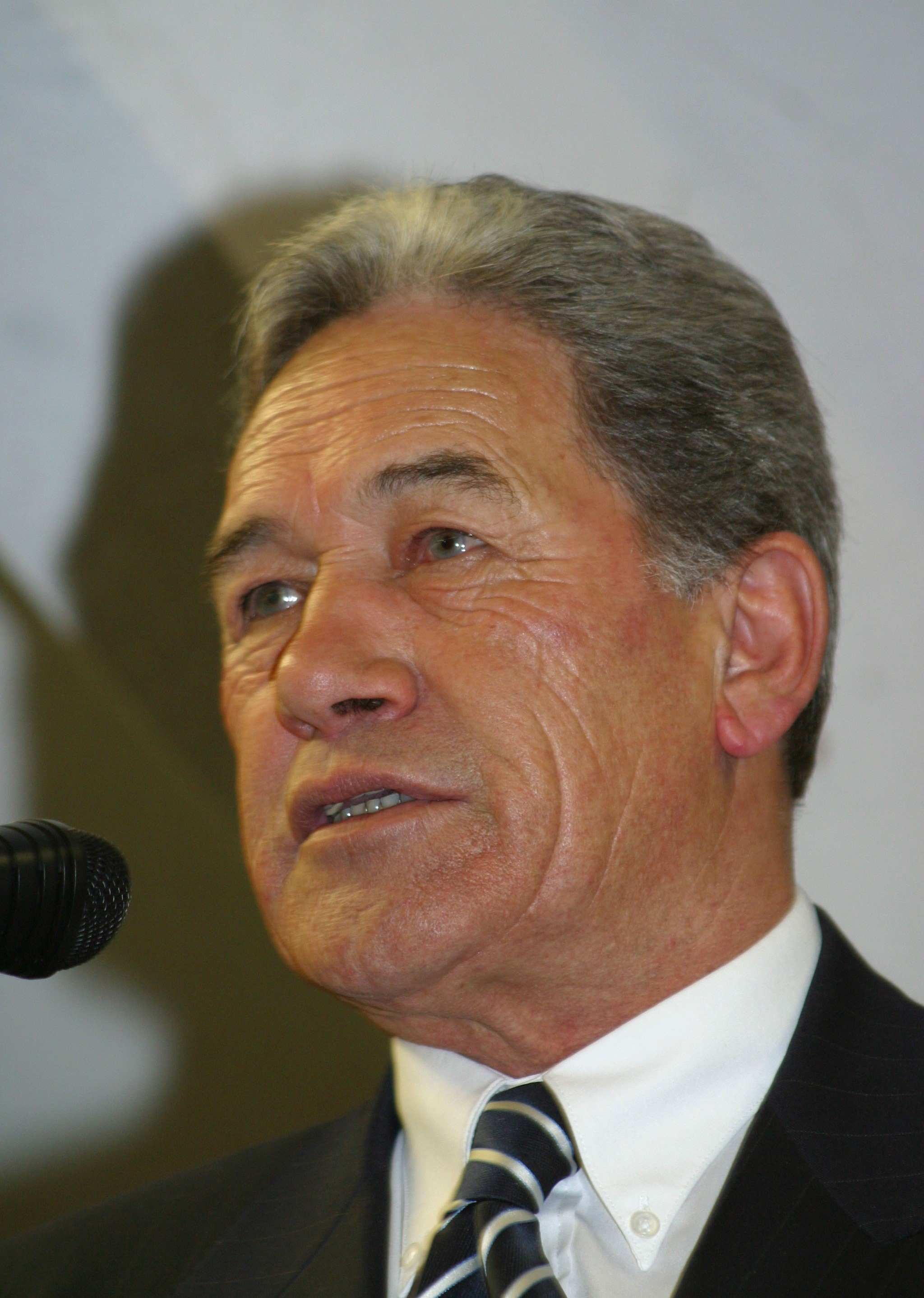
Winston Peters

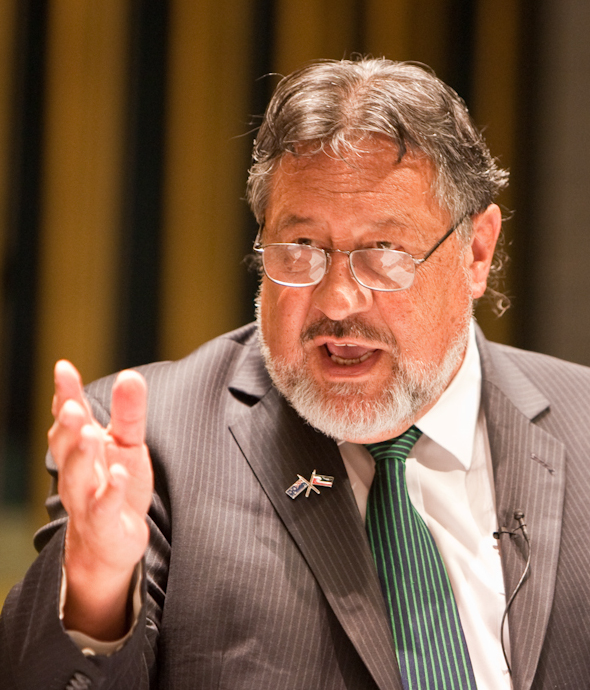
Pita Sharples

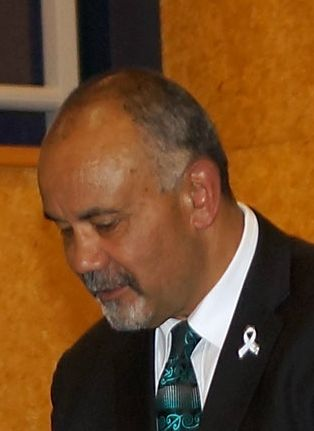
Te Ururoa Flavell

=== Judiciary ===
- Chief Justice – Sian Elias
- President of the Court of Appeal – Mark O'Regan
- Chief High Court judge – Helen Winkelmann
- Chief District Court judge – Jan-Marie Doogue
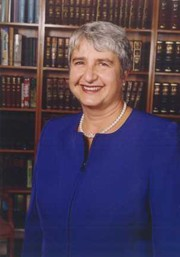
Sian Elias

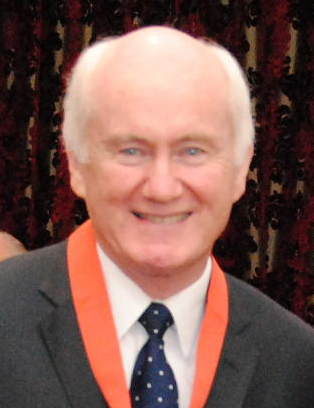
Mark O'Regan

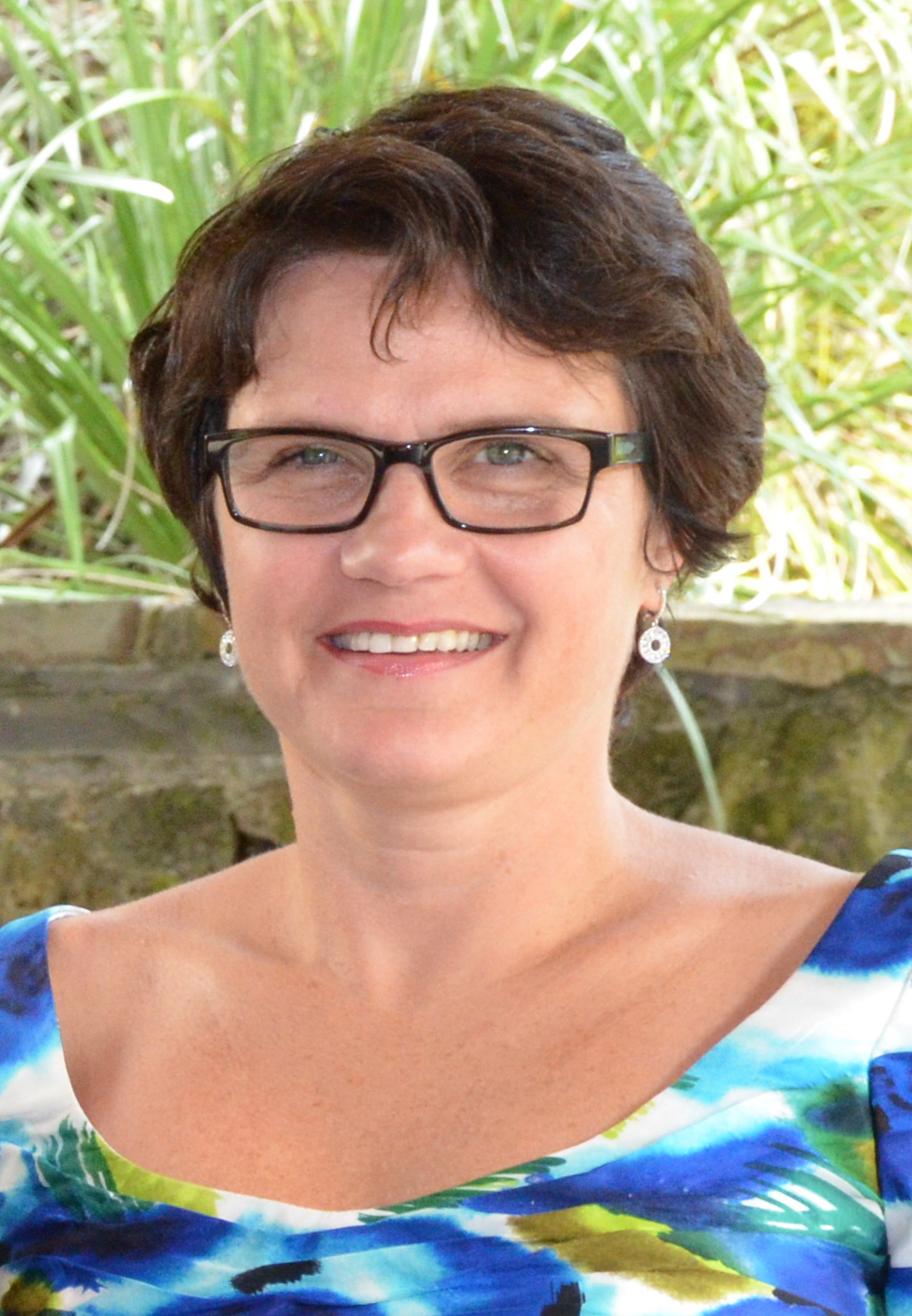
Helen Winkelmann

=== Main centre leaders ===
Local elections for all city and district councils are held on 12 October.

- Mayor of Auckland – Len Brown
- Mayor of Tauranga – Stuart Crosby
- Mayor of Hamilton – Julie Hardaker
- Mayor of Wellington – Celia Wade-Brown
- Mayor of Christchurch – Bob Parker to 12 October, then Lianne Dalziel
- Mayor of Dunedin – Dave Cull
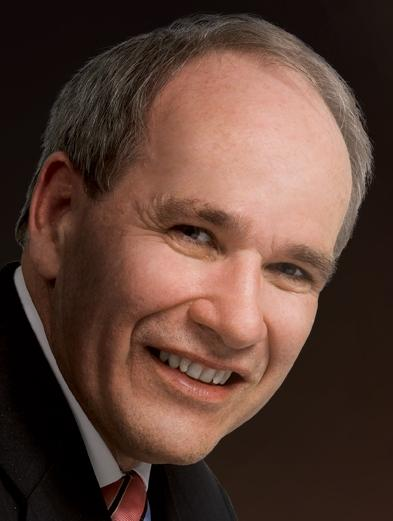
Len Brown

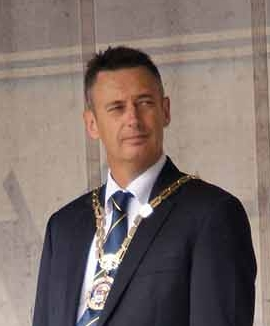
Stuart Crosby

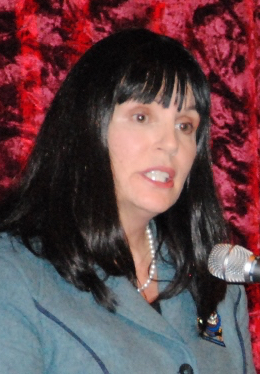
Julie Hardaker

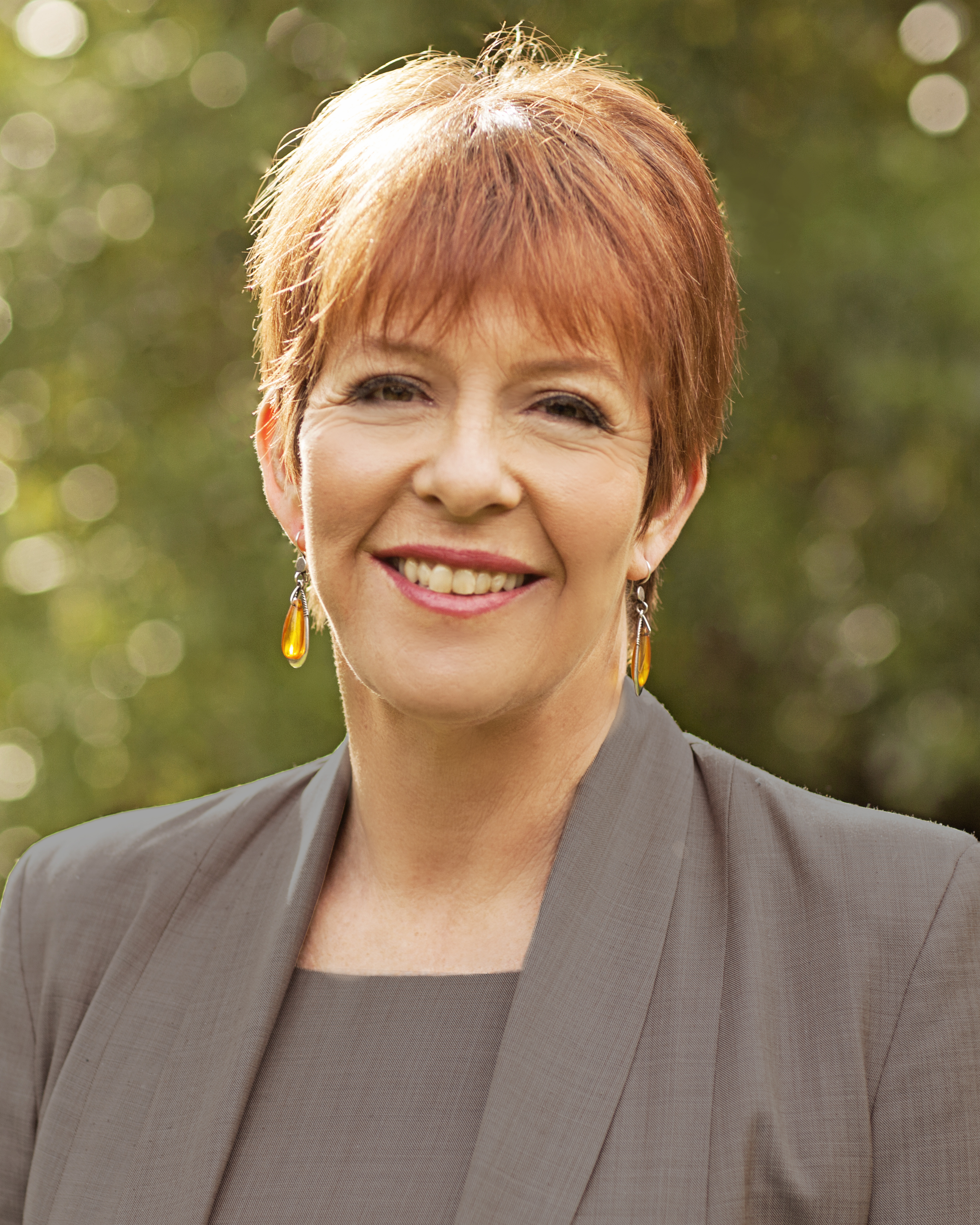
Celia Wade-Brown

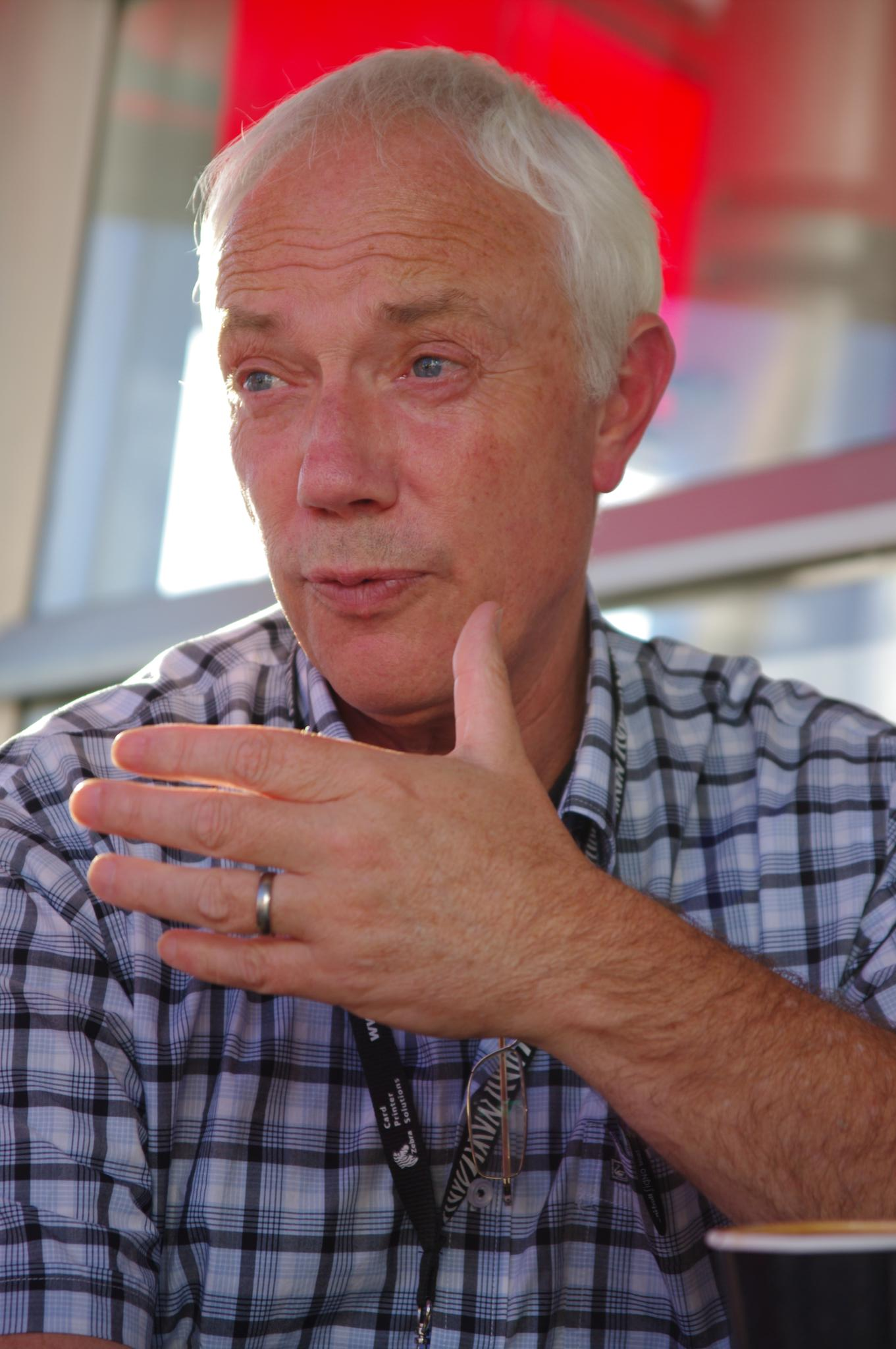
Bob Parker

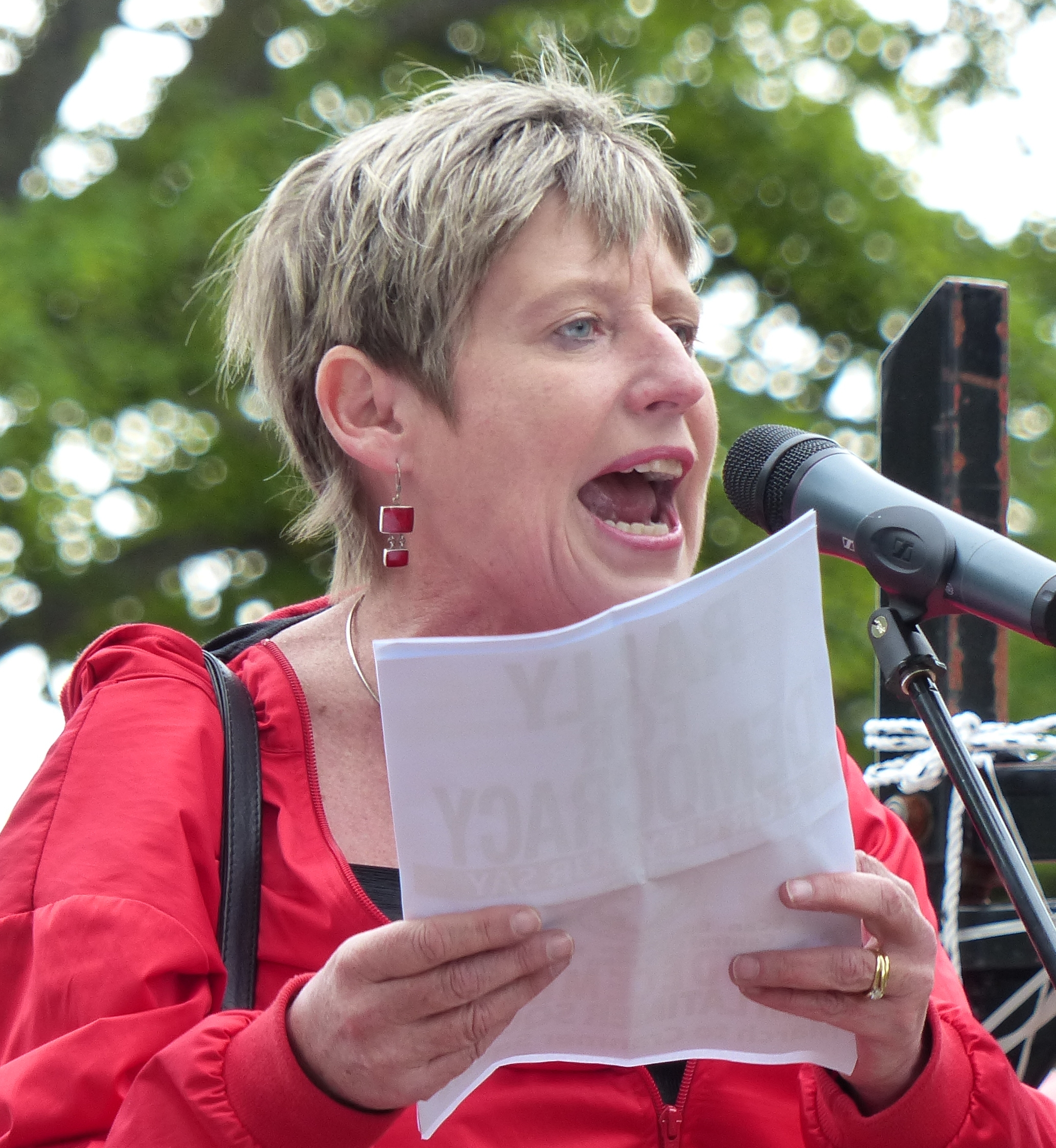
Lianne Dalziell

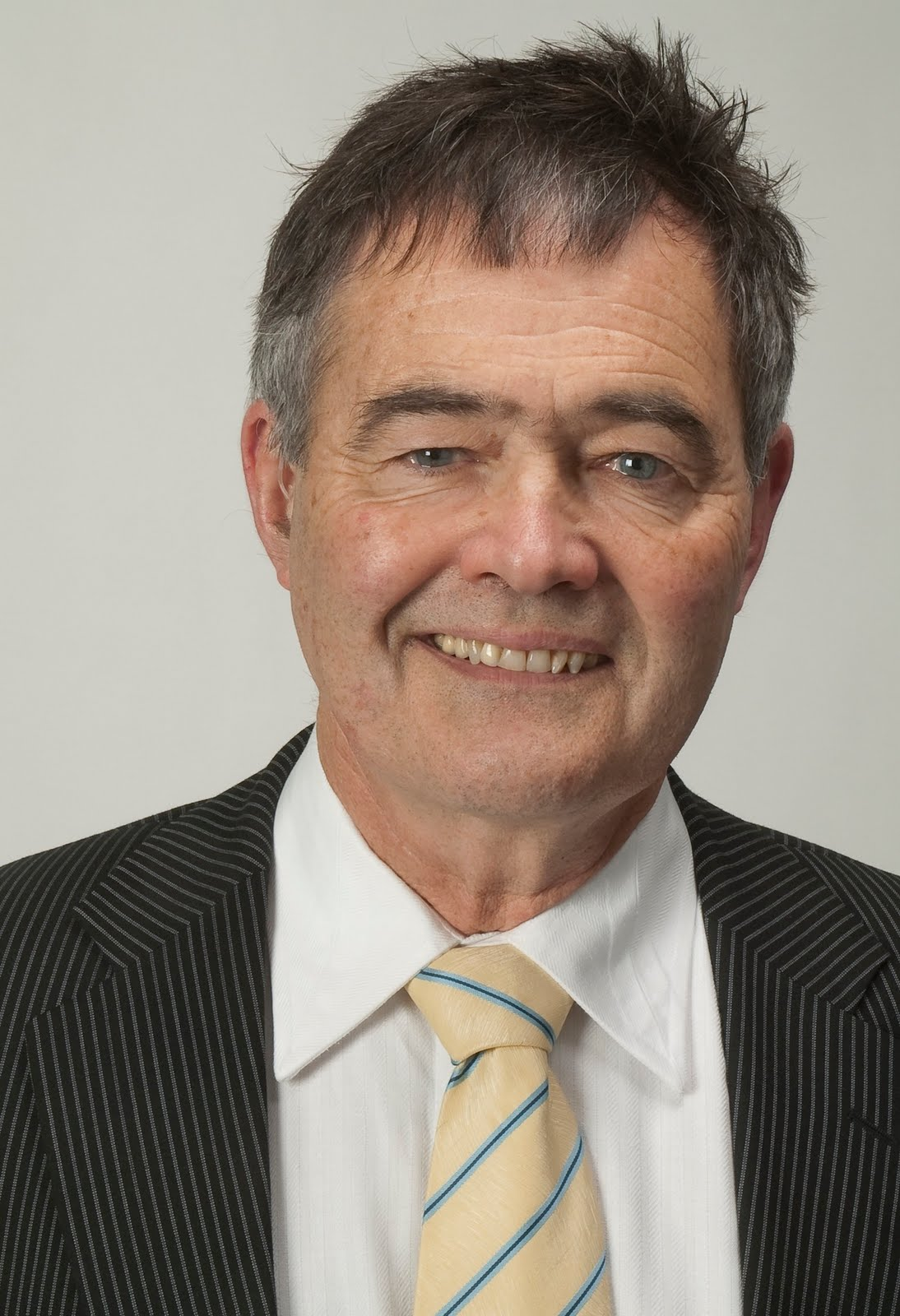
Dave Cull

== Arts and literature ==
=== Performing arts ===
Benny Award presented by the Variety Artists Club of New Zealand to Larry Morris.

== Events ==
=== February ===
- 1 February – Callaghan Innovation, a new Crown entity, is launched to replace Industrial Research Limited and parts of the Ministry of Business, Innovation and Employment.

=== March ===
- 5 March – The 2013 New Zealand census of Population and Dwellings is held, a replacement for the 2011 census that was cancelled after the February 2011 Christchurch earthquake.
- 20 March – Popular breakfast spread Marmite returns to supermarket shelves, albeit still in limited supply, ending "Marmageddon". The sole production line had stopped in November 2011 due to earthquake damage at the Christchurch factory, which resulted in stocks running out in March 2012.

=== April ===
- Police celebrate the second-equal lowest Easter road toll on record – three – second only to 2012's zero.
- The Akaroa Marine Reserve is approved by the Minister of Conservation Nick Smith, 17 years after it was initially proposed.
- 17 April – The Marriage (Definition of Marriage) Amendment Bill passes its third reading, with New Zealand becoming the thirteenth country worldwide to pass laws legalising same-sex marriage.
- 20 April – The 2013 New Zealand gallantry awards are announced.
- 28 April – The South Island completes digital television transition when analogue television signals are switched off at 2:00 am.

=== May ===
- 20 May – A morning peak commuter train derails on the approach to Wellington railway station, puncturing a hole in a carriage's floor in the process. Four people are injured and thousands of commuters are stranded as the line into the city is blocked.

=== June ===
- 20–21 June – Wellington is hit by a storm, described to be the worst since the 1968 Wahine storm, with winds reaching 200 km/h. Thousands of homes lose power and part of the Hutt Valley rail line is washed out, causing severe congestion on roads for a week while it is repaired.
- 29 June – Meka Whaitiri wins the Ikaroa-Rāwhiti by-election, replacing the late Parekura Horomia.
- 30 June – The last of Christchurch's Central City Red Zone cordon is removed.

=== July ===
- 21 July – A series of earthquakes in Cook Strait, the largest of them 6.5 M_{W}, affect Wellington and the upper South Island.

=== August ===
- 16 August – A 6.6 M_{W} earthquake strikes under Lake Grassmere, Marlborough, affecting Wellington and the upper South Island.
- 19 August – The Marriage (Definition of Marriage) Amendment Bill comes into force, allowing same-sex couples to legally marry from this day.
- 22 August – David Shearer announces his resignation as leader of the Labour Party, fearing he no longer had the full confidence of his caucus.

=== September ===
- 15 September – David Cunliffe is elected leader of the Labour Party.
- 29 September – The Lower North Island and East Cape complete digital television transition when analogue television signals are switched off at 3:00 am.

=== October ===
- 7 October – After an appeal to the Privy Council, Mark Lundy's conviction for killing his wife and daughter in August 2000 is quashed and a retrial ordered.
- 12 October – Elections held for all local councils, regional councils and district health boards.
- 14 October – A state of emergency is declared in Manawatu-Wanganui due to flooding.

=== November ===
- 15 November — Over $1.1 billion is allocated to the rebuilding and repairing of 115 severely earthquake damaged schools in greater Christchurch within ten years, which accounts for 80 per cent of classrooms in the region.
- 30 November – Poto Williams wins the Christchurch East by-election, replacing Lianne Dalziel and retaining the seat for Labour.

=== December ===
- 1 December – The Upper North Island becomes the last region to complete digital television transition bringing to an end 53 years of analogue television broadcasts in New Zealand.
- 11 December – New Zealand's population reaches 4,500,000, according to Statistics New Zealand estimates.

=== Holidays and observances ===
- 6 February – Waitangi Day
- 25 April – Anzac Day
- 3 June – Queen's Birthday Monday
- 28 October – Labour Day

== Sport ==
=== Awards ===
- Halberg Awards
  - Supreme Award – Lydia Ko (golf)
  - Sportsman – Scott Dixon (motorsport)
  - Sportswoman – Lydia Ko (golf)
  - Team – All Blacks (rugby)

=== Shooting ===
- Ballinger Belt – John Snowden (Ashburton)

== Births ==
- 6 February – Geronimo, alpaca
- 10 May – Taufaʻahau Manumataongo, son of Crown Prince Tupoutoʻa ʻUlukalala and Princess Sinaitakala Fakafanua of Tonga
- 2 October – Gingernuts, Thoroughbred racehorse
- 8 October – Bonneval, Thoroughbred racehorse

== Deaths ==
=== January ===
- 1 January – Lory Blanchard, rugby league player and coach (born 1924)
- 4 January – Guy Henderson, oboist (born 1934)
- 10 January – Bob Fenton, politician (born 1923)
- 12 January – Helen Brew, actor, birth campaigner, documentary filmmaker, educator and speech therapist (born 1922)
- 25 January – Lloyd Phillips, film producer (born 1949)

=== February ===
- 1 February – Paul Holmes, radio and television broadcaster (born 1950)
- 5 February – Tom McGuigan, politician (born 1921)
- 10 February – Baron Fielakepa, Tongan noble, politician (born 1961)
- 11 February – Tom Aspell, television news producer, foreign correspondent and cameraman (born 1950)
- 16 February – Les McNichol, rugby league player (born 1932)
- 18 February
  - Kevin Black, broadcaster (born 1943)
  - Shayle R. Searle, statistician (born 1928)
- 24 February – Ralph Hotere, artist (born 1931)
- 25 February – Phillip Leishman, broadcaster (born 1951)
- 28 February – Mosese Fotuaika, rugby league player (born 1992)

=== March ===
- 1 March – Sammy Guillen, cricketer (born 1924)
- 2 March – Bryce Rope, rugby union coach (born 1923)
- 3 March – Johnny Hanks, boxer (born 1934)
- 9 March –
  - Geoff Braybrooke, politician (born 1935)
  - Anthony Farrant, cricketer (born 1955)
- 15 March – Joe Schneider, rower (born 1926)
- 18 March – Robin Williams, mathematician, university administrator, public servant (born 1919)
- 20 March
  - George Lowe, mountaineer, last surviving member of 1953 Everest expedition (born 1924)
  - Leslie Milnes, cricketer (born 1922)
- 21 March – Sir Ewan Jamieson, armed forces chief (born 1930)
- 23 March – Peter Sutton, Anglican clergyman, Bishop of Nelson (1965–90) (born 1923)
- 24 March – Barbara Anderson, author (born 1926)
- 29 March – Warren Freer, politician (born 1920)
- 30 March – Eric Hertz, businessman (born 1954)

=== April ===
- 15 April – Dave McArtney, rock guitarist (born 1951)
- 25 April – Eion Scarrow, gardening expert, television presenter, author (born 1931)
- 26 April
  - Joseph Churchward, typeface designer (born 1932)
  - Farrell Temata, rugby union player and coach (born c.1944)
  - Tui Uru, broadcaster, singer (born 1926)
- 27 April – Rodney Wilson, art historian, museum director (born 1945)
- 28 April – Bernie Wood, sports historian, rugby league administrator (born 1939)
- 29 April
  - Alex Elisala, rugby league player (born 1992)
  - Pablo Etchegoin, physicist (born 1964)
  - Parekura Horomia, politician, MP for Ikaroa-Rāwhiti (born 1950)
- 30 April – Rata Harrison, rugby league player (born 1935)

=== May ===
- 15 May – Darrell Tryon, linguist (born 1942)
- 16 May – Maurice Marshall, athlete (born 1927)
- 19 May – Mirek Smíšek, potter (born 1925)
- 21 May – Sir Robert Chambers, jurist (born 1953)
- 22 May – Wayne Cottrell, rugby union player (born 1943)
- 28 May – John Myles, athlete (born 1926)
- 29 May – Dame Margaret Shields, politician (born 1942)

=== June ===
- 2 June – Bruce Cathie, UFO author and theorist (born 1930)
- 4 June
  - Barbara Hale, librarian (born 1924)
  - Samani Pulepule, Samoan religious leader (born 1923)
- 7 June – Lesley Cantwell, racewalker (born 1987)
- 9 June – Noel McMahon, cricketer (born 1916)
- 13 June – Maxwell Sparks, air force pilot (born 1920)
- 17 June – Michael Baigent, author (born 1948)
- 18 June – Hugh Burry, rugby union player, doctor (born 1930)
- 20 June – Peter Dignan, rower (born 1955)
- 21 June – Dame Barbara Goodman, politician (born 1932)
- 27 June – Ian Scott, painter (born 1945)
- 28 June – Kenneth Minogue, political theorist (born 1930)

=== July ===
- 1 July – Maureen Waaka, politician, beauty pageant contestant (born 1942)
- 2 July – Richard Campion, theatre director (born 1923)
- 11 July – Robin Ferrier, organic chemist (born 1932)
- 23 July – Mike Morwood, archaeologist (born 1950)
- 24 July – John Morrissey, rugby union player, businessman, philanthropist (born 1939)
- 25 July – Barnaby Jack, computer security expert (born 1977)
- 27 July – Marty Schmidt, mountaineer (born 1960)

=== August ===
- 1 August – John Blumsky, broadcaster and journalist (born 1928)
- 2 August – Pixie Williams, singer (born 1928)
- 5 August – Leonard Watson, cricketer (born 1927)
- 7 August – Pat Sheahan, rugby union player, publican (born 1927)
- 9 August – John Oakley, cricketer (born 1925)
- 17 August – Gus Winckel, World War II pilot (born 1912)
- 18 August – Bill Tolhurst, politician (born 1931)
- 20 August – Wayne Hodgson, cricketer (born 1959)
- 23 August – Henry Maxwell, rugby league player (born c.1932)
- 27 August – David Stenhouse, evolutionary biologist (born 1932)

=== September ===
- 8 September – Loo-Chi Hu, marine equipment designer, tai chi teacher (born 1924)
- 10 September – Mel Cooke, rugby league player (born 1934)
- 11 September
  - Dave Batten, athlete (born 1926)
  - Albert Jones, amateur astronomer (born 1920)
- 18 September – Roy McLennan, politician, mayor of Nelson (1971–80) (born 1924)
- 19 September – Bob Wallace, test driver, automotive engineer (born 1938)
- 27 September – Larry Savage, rugby union player (born 1928)

=== October ===
- 3 October – Charlie McBride, rugby league player (born 1925)
- 15 October – Pat Ryan, boxer (born 1952)
- 21 October – Karl Sim, artist and art forger (born 1923)
- 23 October – Ted Thorne, naval officer (born 1923)
- 25 October
  - Ron Ackland, rugby league player and coach (born 1934)
  - Paddy McFarlane, association footballer (born 1932)
  - Sir William Tyree, electrical engineer, businessman (born 1921)
- 27 October – Fred Creba, Paralympic athlete (born 1945)
- 31 October – Walter Brown, actor (born 1927)

=== November ===
- 5 November – Ian Irvine, rugby union player, disability rights advocate (born 1929)
- 6 November – Peter Fatialofa, rugby union player and coach (born 1959)
- 11 November – William Fyfe, geologist (born 1927)
- 15 November – Keith Cumberpatch, field hockey player (born 1927)

=== December ===
- 2 December – Manny Santos, boxer (born 1941)
- 12 December – Agnes Wood, artist, writer (born 1921)
- 18 December – Onno Boelee, actor, stuntman, professional wrestler (born 1945)
- 19 December – Olive Smuts-Kennedy, politician (born 1925)
- 20 December – Barbara Heslop, immunologist (born 1925)
- 27 December – Alan Richards, cricketer (born 1922)

== See also ==
- List of years in New Zealand
- Timeline of New Zealand history
- History of New Zealand
- Military history of New Zealand
- Timeline of the New Zealand environment
- Timeline of New Zealand's links with Antarctica
