= Ann McNamara =

Ann McNamara may refer to:

- Ann O'Donnell (hotel proprietor) (c. 1858–1934), née McNamara, New Zealand homemaker and hotel proprietor
- Ann Marie McNamara, American microbiologist
