= Vorrath =

Vorrath is a surname. Notable people with the surname include:

- Franz Vorrath (1937–2022), German Roman Catholic prelate
- Frederick Vorrath (1908–1972), New Zealand rugby union player
- William Vorrath (1904–1934), New Zealand cricketer and rugby union player
