= Witter (surname) =

Witter is a surname. Notable people with the surname include:

- Cherie Witter (born 1963), American model and actress; Playboy Playmate 1985
- Daniel Witter (died 1675), Irish-Anglican priest
- Daniel P. Witter (1852–1930), New York politician
- Dean G. Witter (1887–1969), American businessman; founder of Dean Witter & Co.
- Franklyn Witter (born 1959), Jamaican politician
- George H. Witter (1854–1913), American physician and politician
- Isaac P. Witter (1873–1942), American politician
- John Franklin Witter (1906-1982), American veterinarian and academic
- Jim Witter (born 1964), Canadian country music and Christian music singer and songwriter
- Junior Witter (born 1974), English professional boxer
- Karen Witter (born 1961), American model and actress
- Lisa Witter (born 1973), author
- Nordia Coco Witter (1981), Jamaican musician
- Ray Witter (1896–1983), American football player
- Rick Witter (born 1972), English singer and songwriter
- Tony Witter (born 1965), English professional football player
- Wendy Witter (born 1936), English public servant and charity worker

== Fictional characters ==
- Doug Witter, in the television series Dawson's Creek
- Pacey Witter, in the television series Dawson's Creek

== See also ==
- George Witters (1876–1934), New Zealand farmer, horticulturist and conservationist
