= Witter =

Witter may refer to:

== People ==
- Witter (surname)
- Witter Bynner (1881–1968), American poet and translator

== Places ==
- Witter, Arkansas, an unincorporated community
- Witter, California, alternate name of Witter Springs, California
- Witter (civil parish), a civil parish in County Down, Northern Ireland
- Witter Field, a minor-league baseball ballpark in Wisconsin Rapids, Wisconsin

== Other uses ==
- USS Witter (DE-636), a World War II destroyer escort

== See also ==
- Witter Field, baseball ballpark in Wisconsin Rapids, Wisconsin
- Witter House, Chaplin, Connecticut, on the National Register of Historic Places
- Dean Witter Reynolds, New York City, American financial company
