= Frederick Harper =

New Zealand cricketer

Personal information
- Born: 24 November 1863; Bolton, Lancashire, England
- Died: 19 January 1937 (aged 73); Christchurch, New Zealand

Domestic team information
- Years: Team
- 1886/87–1894/95: Otago

Career statistics
Competition	First-class
Matches	14
Runs scored	297
Batting average	12.91
100s/50s	0/2
Top score	69
Balls bowled	20
Wickets	1
Bowling average	2.00
5 wickets in innings	0
10 wickets in match	0
Best bowling	1/2
Catches/stumpings	4/–
- Source: ESPNcricinfo, 1 February 2019

Frederick Harper (24 November 1863 – 19 January 1937) was a New Zealand cricketer. He played fourteen first-class matches for Otago between 1886 and 1895.

Harper was a stylish batsman and brilliant fieldsman who captained Otago in most of his matches. He made 53, the highest score of the match, and the highest score of the short New Zealand first-class season, in 1887-88 when Otago beat Canterbury.

After visiting England for the purposes of finding a suitable coach for the Otago Cricket Association, Harper secured the services of Joseph Lawton, who became the first professional cricket coach in New Zealand. Harper paid half of Lawton's salary for the first year. Lawton's success led to his re-engagement for several seasons.

Harper was a partner in the firm of Messrs McKerrow, Lees and Co, soft goods merchants. He retired to live in Timaru with his wife, who survived him.
