= Tessa Birnie =

Australian musician

Tessa Daphne Birnie OAM (19 July 1924 – 10 March 2008) was an internationally acclaimed New Zealand and Australian concert pianist.

== Biography ==
Birnie was born in Ashburton, on the South Island of New Zealand, in 1924. She first heard a piano in a local hall when she was three or four, and decided then that the piano was to be her destiny. Her mother Edna took her to the North Island when she was 10, and she did not see her father again until she was an adult. She achieved the Royal School of Music's licentiate when she was 14. Instead of attending secondary school, she was taught by private tutors. Her music teachers included the Viennese Jewish refugee pianist Paul Schramm (1892–1953) who was living in Wellington, and French pianists Nadia Boulanger and Yvonne Lefébure. She gave a recital in Auckland when she was 14, and then toured New Zealand before travelling to Europe with her mother. She lived in Paris, London and Lake Como in Italy, where she studied with Karl Ulrich Schnabel, the son of Artur Schnabel. From the beginning, her mother supported and encouraged her, performing the roles of "travelling companion, business manager, concert organiser and lady-in-waiting".

She made her debut as a concert pianist in Paris in 1960. She was reunited with her father in the 1960s, on her return from Europe, around which time the family moved to Sydney, Australia, where they lived in Middle Cove. After her parents died she shared her house with other musicians. She founded the Sydney Camerata Orchestra in 1961 and the Australian Society for Keyboard Music in 1964.

Birnie made many recordings, including a 1977 recording of Beethoven's Moonlight Sonata, played at its original lower pitch with the composer's original pedals, and rediscovered numerous forgotten pieces for piano from the 17th and 18th centuries. Highly acclaimed for her marathon performances in Australia and Europe, she also performed the entire cycle of Schubert sonatas in San Francisco in 1961 and Haydn's complete keyboard works in 1982. Her music memory was "phenomenal". She was awarded the West German Government's Beethoven Medallion in 1974. In 1985 she was awarded the Medal of the Order of Australia (OAM).

She wrote numerous texts on keyboard music, as well as a 1997 autobiography entitled I'm Going to Be a Pianist! (Sydney: Azzano Press, ISBN 978-0646306315). Birnie did not marry, and "her comforts were Jane Austen's novels and chocolates". She died in Sydney in 2008, aged 83.
