= Eugene Paykel =

British psychiatrist

Eugene Stern Paykel (9 September 1934 – 3 September 2023) was a British psychiatrist. He is known for his research work on depression, clinical psychopharmacology and social psychiatry over more than 40 years.

== Early life and education ==
Paykel was born in Auckland, New Zealand, and received his medical degree at the University of Otago Medical School, Dunedin, followed by training in psychiatry at the Maudsley Hospital London.

== Career ==
Paykel undertook research at Yale University, New Haven USA, where he became co-founder of the depression Research Unit. Returning to London, he worked at St George's Hospital Medical School London, rising to the rank of Professor of Psychiatry. From 1985 to 2001 he was Professor of Psychiatry and Head of Department at the University of Cambridge, and Fellow, Gonville and Caius College; after retirement, he became later was Emeritus Professor and Fellow. He published over 400 journal papers and book chapters, and eight books.

Paykel conducted an early controlled trial showing the need to continue antidepressant medication for some months after remission in order to prevent relapse, and a later trial showing depressive relapse prevention by cognitive therapy, effectiveness of antidepressant treatment in milder depression in general practice. He carried out the first study showing conclusively the importance of recent stressful life events in the onset of depression subsequently extended to the role of life events in other psychiatric disorders.

Paykel was joint founding editor of the Journal of Affective Disorders from 1979 to 1993 and also edited the journal Psychological Medicine from 1994 to 2006. He was Vice-and later President of the Royal College of Psychiatrists. He was President of the British Association for Psychopharmacology at various times (later Honorary Member) and a member of the Collegium Internationale Neuropsychopharmacologicum (CINP), and Marce Society (International Society for Disorders of Childbearing). He was elected a Fellow of the UK Academy of Medical Sciences at its foundation in 1998. He received the American Psychiatric Association Foundations Fund Prize (jointly), the European College of Neuropsychopharmacology-Lilly Award for Clinical Neuroscience, and the British Association for Psychopharmacology Lifetime Achievement Award.

== Death ==
Paykel died on 3 September 2023, at the age of 88.

== Selected publications ==
- The Depressed Woman: A study of Social Relationships. (with M.M. Weissman) University of Chicago Press, Chicago (1974)
- Handbook of Affective Disorders: 1st ed 1982, 2nd ed 1992. (ed.) E.S. Paykel. Churchill Livingston)
- Paykel, ES; DiMascio, A; Klerman, GL; Prusoff, BA; Weissman, MM (May 1976). "Maintenance therapy of depression". Pharmakopsychiatr Neuropsychopharmakol. 9 (3): 127–39. doi:10.1055/s-0028-1094487. PMID 981327.
- Paykel, E.S.; Scott, J.; Teasdale, J.D.; Johnson, A.L.; Garland, A.; Moore, R.; Jenaway, A.; Cornwall, P.L.; Hayhurst, H.; Abbott, R.; Pope, M. (1999). "Prevention of relapse in residual depression by cognitive therapy. A controlled trial". Arch. Gen. Psychiatry. 56 (9): 829–835. doi:10.1001/archpsyc.56.9.829. PMID 12884889.
- Paykel, ES; Ramana, R; Cooper, Z; Hayhurst, H; Kerr, J; Barocka, A (November 1995). "Residual symptoms after partial remission: an important outcome in depression". Psychol Med. 25 (6): 1171–80. doi:10.1017/s0033291700033146. PMID 8637947.
- Paykel ES, Hollyman JA, Freeling P, Sedgwick P. J "Predictors of therapeutic benefit from amitriptyline in mild depression: a general practice placebo-controlled trial.
- Paykel, ES; Myers, JK; Dienelt, MN; Klerman, GL; Lindenthal, JJ; Pepper, MP (December 1969). "Life events and depression. A controlled study". Arch Gen Psychiatry. 21 (6): 753–60. doi:10.1001/archpsyc.1969.01740240113014. PMID 5389659.
- Paykel, ES; Prusoff, BA; Myers, JK (1975). "Suicide attempts and recent life events. A controlled comparison". Arch Gen Psychiatry. 32 (3): 327–33. doi:10.1001/archpsyc.1975.01760210061003. PMID 1115573.
- Paykel, ES; Emms, EM; Fletcher, J; Rassaby, ES (1980). "Life events and social support in puerperal depression". Br J Psychiatry. 136 (4): 339–46. doi:10.1192/bjp.136.4.339. PMID 7388241.
