= William Triggs =

New Zealand journalist, newspaper editor and politician

William Henry Triggs (10 May 1855 – 17 June 1934) was a New Zealand journalist, newspaper editor, and politician. He was a member of the New Zealand Legislative Council from 1918 to 1932.

== Biography ==
He was born in Chichester, England and educated at private schools in England. He emigrated to New Zealand in 1878 and worked as a journalist, initially on The Evening Post of Wellington, then The Timaru Herald of which he was the editor 1885–1886. He then moved to The Press of Christchurch, of which he was the editor from 1895 to 1919 and a director from 1909 to 1919. He was president of the New Zealand Institute of Journalists in 1900–1901. He was present at the signing of the peace Treaty of Versailles.

He was appointed to the New Zealand Legislative Council on 7 May 1918, and was reappointed from 7 May 1925. His second term ended on 6 May 1932.

He married Marion, daughter of Rev. J. Dumbell in 1882; they had two sons and one daughter. He died on 17 June 1934 in Wellington.
