= James Glasgow (cricketer) =

New Zealand cricketer (1850–1934)

Personal information
- Full name: James McClure Glasgow
- Born: 1850; India
- Died: 12 August 1934 (aged 83–84); Wellington, New Zealand
- Role: Wicket-keeper

Domestic team information
- Years: Team
- 1866/67–1868/69: Otago
- Source: ESPNcricinfo, 12 May 2016

James McClure Glasgow (1850 – 12 August 1934) was a New Zealand cricketer. He played three first-class matches for Otago between the 1866–67 and 1868–69 seasons.

Glasgow was born in British India in 1850. He was educated at Otago Boys' High School in Dunedin and later worked as a civil servant and as an accountant.
