= Pablo Etchegoin =

Argentine-New Zealand physicist (1964–2013)

Pablo Gabriel Etchegoin
- Born: 12 September 1964; La Plata, Argentina
- Died: 29 April 2013 (aged 48)
- Education: University of Stuttgart

Pablo Gabriel Etchegoin (12 September 1964 – 29 April 2013 ) was an Argentine-New Zealand physicist.

== Academic career ==
Born in 1964 in La Plata, Argentina, he obtained a BSc in electrical engineering from the National University of La Plata and then The Institute of Physics José A Balseiro where he obtained a BSc in physics in 1989. He completed his PhD at the Max Planck Institute for Solid State Physics in Stuttgart with Manuel Cardona in 1994 and spent time at the University of Cambridge before moving to Victoria University of Wellington in 2003, where he built a Raman spectroscopy lab. In 2004, he was awarded the T. K. Sidey Medal, an award set up by the Royal Society of New Zealand for outstanding scientific research. He died of pancreatic cancer in 2013.
