= James Bell (geologist) =

New Zealand geologist, writer and company director

James Abbott Mackintosh Bell (23 September 1877 – 31 March 1934), known as Mack Bell to his Canadian friends, was a Canadian-born geologist, writer, and company director in New Zealand. He was born in St Andrews, Quebec on 23 September 1877 and graduated from Harvard University in 1904. In 1909, he married Vera Margaret Beauchamp, the older sister of the writer Katherine Mansfield.
