= Carlo Bergamini (sculptor) =

Italian sculptor (1868–1934)

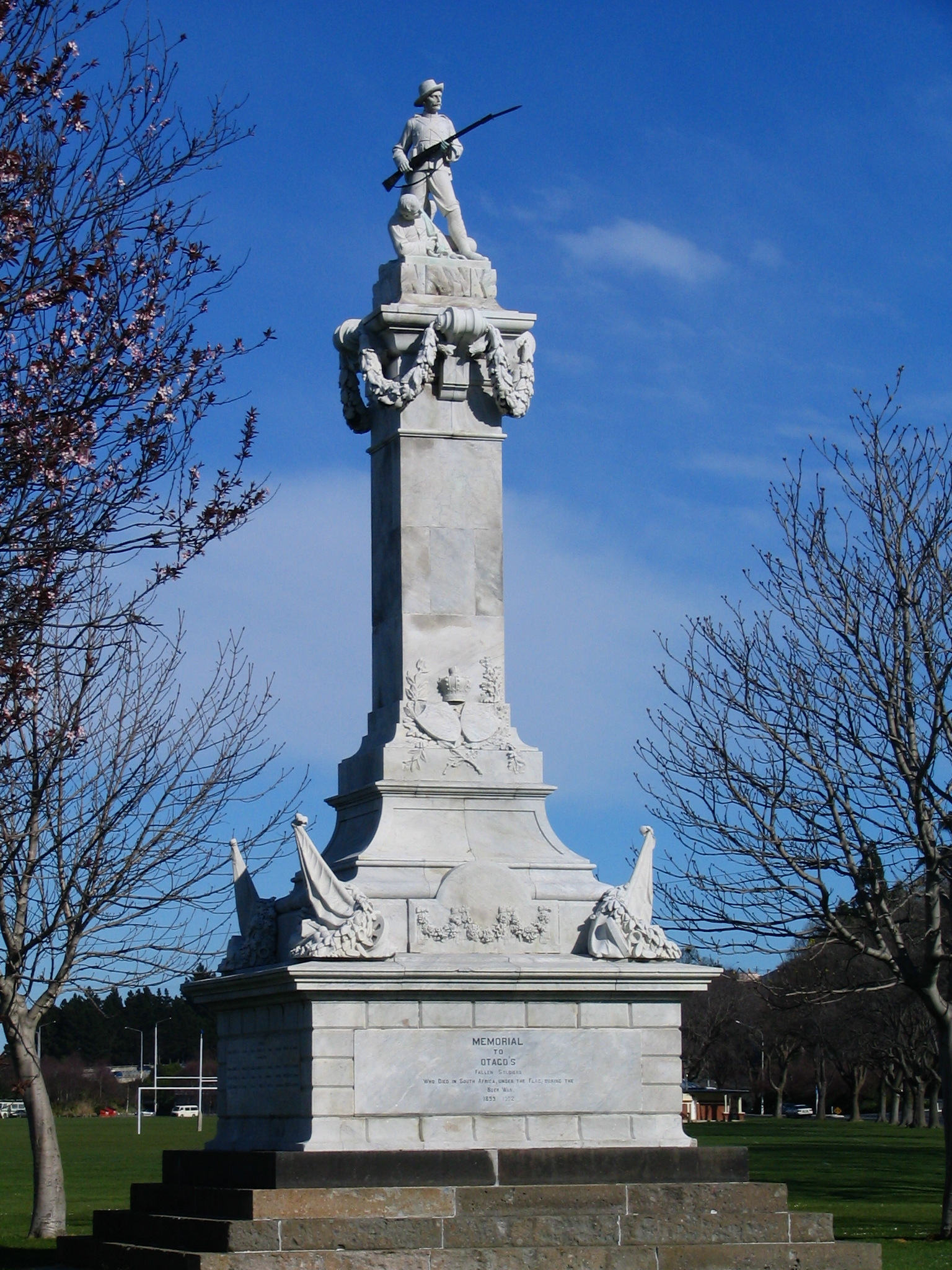
Dunedin's Boer War memorial, designed by Bergamini and erected in 1906

Carlo Giuseppe Bergamini (19 January 1868 – 16 July 1934) was a sculptor and monumental mason born in Carrara, in Italy, who later migrated to New Zealand. He is known there as the designer of a number of well-regarded war memorials, in New Zealand, relating to the Boer War.
