= Kapiti Urban Area =

Coordinates: 40.8865°S 175.0278°E

Kapiti
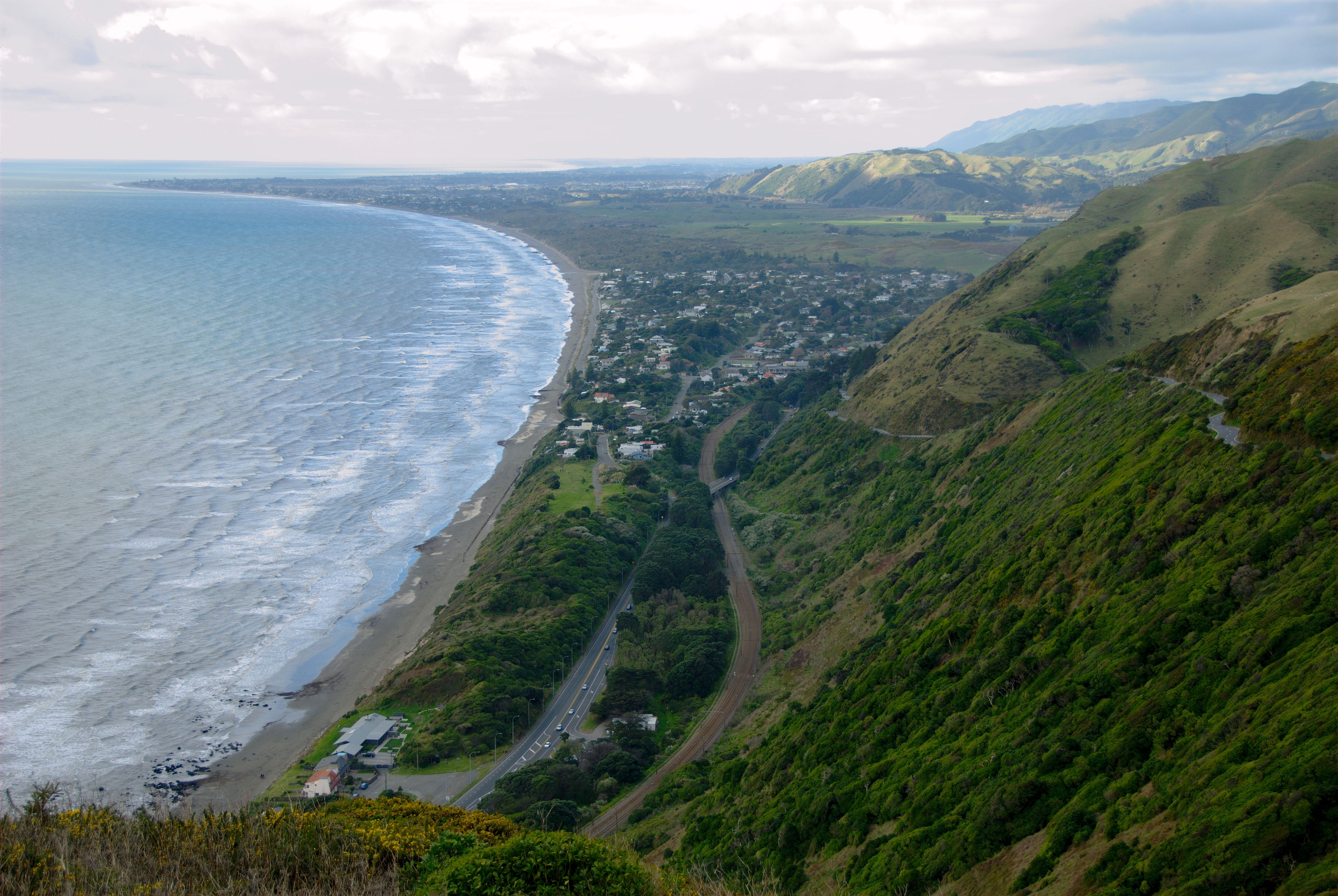
- The Kapiti Urban Area viewed looking north from Paekākāriki Hill.
- Interactive map of Kapiti
- Country: New Zealand
- Region: Wellington Region
- Territorial authority: Kāpiti Coast District

Population (June 2018)
  - City: 42,700
  - Urban: 42,700
- Postcode(s): 5032
- Area code: 04

The Kapiti Urban Area is a statistical area that was defined by Statistics New Zealand to cover a group of urban settlements of the Kāpiti Coast District, in the Wellington Region. It was classified as a main urban area under the New Zealand Standard Areas Classification 1992 because its population exceeded 30,000.

The settlements comprise (north to south):

- Waikanae
- Paraparaumu (including Otaihanga, Raumati Beach and Raumati South)
- Paekākāriki

The largest settlement is Paraparaumu. Raumati may be considered a suburb of Paraparaumu or a separate town in its own right – there are no legal definitions for towns in New Zealand. Kapiti Urban Area is better described as a commuter area of Wellington than an independent city.

Under Statistical Standard for Geographic Areas 2018, Kapiti Urban Area was split into separate urban areas for the three settlements.

The Kāpiti Coast District also includes the settlements of Te Horo and Ōtaki, which are outside Kapiti Urban Area.
