= Don Aickin =

New Zealand obstetrician and gynaecologist (1934–2019)

Donald Aickin
- Born: Donald Russell Aickin; 31 October 1934
- Died: 29 August 2019 (aged 84); Christchurch, New Zealand
- Education: University of Otago (MB ChB); University of Melbourne (MD)
- Scientific career
- Fields: Obstetrics and gynaecology
- Workplaces: University of Otago, Christchurch
- Thesis: Prediction of fetal risk by maternal blood oestrogen measurement (1972)

Donald Russell Aickin (31 October 1934 – 29 August 2019) was a New Zealand obstetrician and gynaecologist. He was professor of obstetrics and gynaecology at the University of Otago Christchurch School of Medicine from 1972 until his retirement in 2000 when he was conferred professor emeritus.

== Biography ==
Born in 1934, Aickin studied medicine at the University of Otago, graduating MB ChB in 1958. Later, in 1972, he completed a Doctor of Medicine degree at the University of Melbourne; the title of his MD thesis was Prediction of fetal risk by maternal blood oestrogen measurement.

In 1972, Aickin was appointed as head of department and professor of obstetrics and gynaecology at the University of Otago Christchurch School of Medicine. In 2000, following his retirement, he was conferred the title of professor emeritus. Aickin was a Fellow of the Royal College of Obstetricians and Gynaecologists, the Royal New Zealand College of Obstetricians and Gynaecologists, the Royal College of Surgeons of Edinburgh and the Royal Australasian College of Surgeons.

== Death ==
Aickin died in Christchurch on 29 August 2019.
