= George Webbe (cricketer, born 1856) =

New Zealand cricketer (1856–1934)

George Webbe (1856 – 7 June 1934) was a New Zealand cricketer who played three first-class matches for Wellington. He was born in Galway, Ireland, and died in Levin, New Zealand.
