= Robert Brown (New Zealand cricketer) =

New Zealand cricketer (1850–1934)

Personal information
- Full name: Robert William Brown
- Born: 15 December 1850; Dunedin, Otago, New Zealand (Note: Contemporary obituaries state that Brown was born in Scotland, traveled to Dunedin as a young child and that he was aged 85 at the time of his death. CricInfo and CricketArchive give his place of birth as Dunedin.)
- Died: 8 December 1934 (aged 83); Christchurch, Canterbury, New Zealand

Domestic team information
- Years: Team
- 1870/71: Otago
- Source: ESPNcricinfo, 6 May 2016

Robert William Brown (15 December 1850 – 8 December 1934) was a New Zealand sportsman. He played one first-class cricket match for Otago during the 1870–71 season.

Brown was born in 1850 into one of the first families to settle in Dunedin. (Note: Dunedin was established in 1848.) He was one of the first boarders at Nelson College before joining Otago Boys' High School when the school was established in 1863, playing cricket for the school between 1864 and 1868. His only first-class match was a January 1871 fixture against Canterbury played at Hagley Oval in Christchurch, the only match played in New Zealand during the season which has been deemed to be first-class. He scored 1 not out in Otago's first inning and 1 in the second as the team lost by an innings.

As well as cricket, Brown played rugby union for the Otago representative side and lawn tennis. In later life he was a lawn bowler.

Brown worked in the insurance industry, initially for the National Insurance Company in its Dunedin office. He moved to Australia to work for Dalgety and Nicholls at Melbourne before returning to New Zealand where he founded the Farmers' Co-operative Insurance Association of New Zealand. He served as the organisation's secretary for 30 years. Brown lived at Christchurch and died in the city in 1934 aged 83. He was married to Annie Wilson; the couple had no children.
