= Nordia Witter =

- Born: 8 July 1981 (age 45); Kingston, Jamaica
- Genres: Reggae
- Occupation: vocalist
- Instruments: Vocals, drums, keyboards

Nordia Witter, is a Jamaican singer and songwriter. She is known for popular songs in the reggae style of music including "Be Alone Tonight" and "I'm a Player in the Band.". She has been featured in Rolling Stone.

== Early life ==
Nordia Witter is from Kingston, Jamaica. She has been honing her pop-infused, EDM, reggae and dancehall sound and started by singing in her high school choir. During her teen years and early 20s, Nordia's extensive travels between the Caribbean islands, Miami, New York City, Los Angeles and throughout Europe would see her begin to incorporate her global perspective into her lyrics, performance and vocal styling. Her 2004 hit single "Be Alone Tonight" garnered reputable industry acclaim.

Witter has a background in acting and modeling. In 2000–2002, she was featured in the Jamaican films Cess Silvera's "Shottas" and Rick Elgood's "One Love," as well as the Shaggy and Ali G video "Me Julie" and "Darnell Jones". While attending the Edna Manley College of Visual and Performing Arts in Kingston, she worked as a commercial/glamour model and garnered several awards, including first place Ms. Venus and second place Ms. Surrey. She was placed in the bodybuilding competition for Best Legs, and won the Ms. Jamaica Bikini title as well as many more.

== Professional life ==
In 2003, Witter left Jamaica to pursue her second lifelong passion in fashion and had plans to attend the London College of Fashion so she could work toward her dream of becoming a fashion designer. During her stay in London, she met influential people in the film and music industries, including Rod MacSween from International Talent Booking.

During this time, she got reengaged in the music industry and realized that it had always been her first love. Her first time to get behind a microphone in a studio was actually during her visit to the U.K. in the early 2000s.

One morning, she woke to a devastating phone call, learning that her brother had been killed. Without hesitation, she immediately packed her things and returned to Jamaica. While being back home, she was introduced in 2003 by a mutual friend of singer Peter Lloyd who then introduced her to a girl group/ band called MBC managed and produced by Computer Paul at his Boot Camp Studio located in Harbor View. She stayed in the band for a short while and made several appearances both on TV and at local stage shows.

After her time spent with the band, she decided to give her career in music another try. Nordia was introduced to the UIM Recording Studio where she recorded her first single. The studio is owned by brothers Blacka Diamond and Andrew Blacks and located in Stony Hill, which is a neighborhood close to where she grew up. She was then introduced to Cecil Collins who became her manager. Nordia was soon signed to the Canadian label Cesoul Music. During this time, she shot the video for her single "Be Alone Tonight" which quickly topped charts both locally and internationally.

In 2004, she met Jon Baker, Music Executive Producer, owner of the Geejam Collection, Geejam Studios, and founder of the successful Gee Street Music label from the ‘90s, whom she introduced to her manager. Baker was also one of the producers of Jamaica's extremely popular "Rising Stars" TV show.

=== Breakthrough ===
In 2006, she started recording at Geejam Studios in Port Antonio, Jamaica, and was simultaneously featured on international TV channels, including BET. Nordia later teamed up with Santigold and did a collaboration with Switch and Diplo, a record producer, rapper, singer, songwriter and record executive who is the co-creator and lead member of the dancehall music project, Major Lazer. In addition, she recorded on the tracks "I'm On Yah," "Touch Me" and "Tip Pon Toe," written by Angela Hunt, which was later sold to Rihanna. As she grew to understand more about the music industry, she realized she needed a bit more training to complete the package. She decided to go back to Edna Manley College of Music and Performing Arts to do a course in music theory and piano to enhance what was already at her core. She also did one-on-one vocal training. In addition, she did some media training at CPTC.

Nordia had previously met Cordel "Skatta" Burrell, producer of the "Coolie Dance Riddim", and now a host on "Magnum Kings and Queens of Dancehall", who had heard some of the early songs she recorded in London. Although there was potential to collaborate, they didn't at that time because he was a hardcore dancehall producer and Nordia was not doing dancehall. She happened to meet with him again later when he introduced her to Dale Dizzle Virgo, who was also a graduate of The Edna Manley College of Visual and Performing Arts. Virgo asked her to sing something; she sang "One More Chance," a song she wrote herself. He immediately began to play the keyboards along with her. At that moment, she knew they were going to be doing a lot of work together. After Nordia introduced Virgo to Jon Baker, he joined the Geejam Team as the in-house studio engineer and producer. Dale is also one-half of the dancehall EDM soundsystem DizTroy with partner Troy Baker, Baker's eldest son.

Subsequently, Nordia added quite a number of songs to her discography, including "Nice n' Slow," "Crazy" featuring Chris Martin," "Hour Glass," "Mr. DJ," "Tell Me What You Wanna," "Runway," "I Want You," "Over," "Ole School Luv," "Lost Myself," "Immortal," "B Rida," "Gypsy" where she was doing a featuring for Charly B, and "Candy Crush" featuring Marlow Skye, along with many more that have yet to be released.

In both 2011 and 2013, she was invited by Brandon Bakshi to participate in and signed to the BMI Writers Camp which was held at Anchor Recording Studio in Kingston; singer-songwriter Oceana who was part of her team recorded "Everybody (Na Na Na)," the official song of the 2014 FIFA World Cup, as well as Reggie Saunderson, a performer who has been writing for R&B star Trina throughout her musical career and rapper M1.

In 2013, Nordia was introduced to Substance Muzik and did a remix for her Dancehall/Soca single "B Rida." It was released in 2014 and gained widespread attention because of a drastic turn around from her style of Lovers Rock/Pop to the Dancehall genre. She then created team "Coco" and formed a band around the project, rebranding Nordia "Coco" Witter entirely.

The popular "I’m A Player In The Band" is another song she recorded with Substance Muzik, as well as her recent hit "Wuk Di Money." "Wuk Di Money" was also featured on Noisey Jamaica, alongside Island Records founder Chris Blackwell, and hosted by Walshy Fire from Major Lazer. Additional TV features include: Anthony Bourdain: Parts Unknown, the BET Jazz channel, MTV, Vice TV, and many more. She has also been featured in Rolling Stone.

== Personal life ==
Nordia met music Executive Music Producer Jon Baker in 2004 and they had a son in 2007. They got married in 2013 at the Trident Hotel and Trident Castle, both properties whose complete upgrade and renovation Baker was responsible for managing and implementing from the ground up as part of his Geejam Collection Hotel Group, which compromises a boutique hotel, private villas, and a state-of-the-art recording studio in Port Antonio, Jamaica.

Nordia's mother-in-law is Maureen Baker, a British former fashion designer. She was the chief designer for the Susan Small label for many years, before working for her own label. She is perhaps best known as the designer of the wedding dress of Princess Anne.

The older brother of Witter, who was close to her, died in a motorcycle accident on 26 December 2014, a year after he had walked her up the aisle during her wedding ceremony. After his demise, Witter decided to take a break from her music career and focus on spiritualism. Later, Witter resumed her music career by collaborating with the British mix engineer Tom Elmhirst, who had worked with Amy Winehouse, Adele, David Bowie, Beck and Cage The Elephant. In addition, she began venturing into other areas of business such as making a fashion line and also played the part of an A&R/Co-Manager for Gee Street Records.

== See also ==
- Annette Brissett
- Barry Brown (singer)
