= John Morrissey (rugby union) =

- Born: Peter John Morrissey; 18 July 1939 Christchurch, New Zealand
- Died: 24 July 2013 (aged 74) Christchurch, New Zealand
- Height: 1.78 m (5 ft 10 in)
- Weight: 72 kg (159 lb)
- School: Christchurch Boys' High School
- Occupation: Businessman

Rugby union career
- Position: Wing
Provincial / State sides
Years	Team	Apps	(Points)
1960?–62	Canterbury		
1963–64	Otago		
International career
Years	Team	Apps	(Points)
1962	New Zealand	3	(6)

Peter John Morrissey (18 July 1939 – 24 July 2013) was a New Zealand rugby union player, businessman and philanthropist.

== Early life ==
Born in Christchurch in 1939, Morrissey got his first after-school job at the age of nine, working for a local harness-racing trainer. He was educated at Christchurch Boys' High School from 1953 to 1957, and played for the school's 1st XV rugby team, scoring three tries against Otago Boys' High School in the curtain-raiser to the third test between the All Blacks and South Africa in 1956 at Lancaster Park. After he left school, Morrissey first worked as an office boy for Wright Stephenson.

In 1959, Morrissey broke 49 seconds for 440 yards and represented Canterbury at the national athletics championships.

== Rugby union ==
A wing, Morrissey was selected for Canterbury B in 1959, and went on to represent Canterbury and Otago at provincial level. He was a member of the New Zealand national side in 1962, playing three test matches against Australia.

== Business career and philanthropy ==
Morrissey was appointed branch manager of A.M. Satterthwaite in Dunedin in 1963, and chief executive of Edmonds Group in Christchurch in about 1969. In 1985 he established Eltec Industrial Electronics with Christchurch electronics engineer Dennis Chapman. The company became Swichtec Power Systems in 1994 and eventually grew to employ over 400 staff. It was sold to British complay BTR plc in 1998. Morrissey retired as Swichtec chief executive at the beginning of 2000. In about 2002, he invested in the Lochlea charolais stud near Lake Ellesmere, south of Christchurch.

In 2004, Morrissey appeared on the National Business Review "rich list", with an estimated worth, mostly in property, of NZ$30 million.

Morrissey was involved with the Hohepa Foundation, which provides accommodation and support to people with intellectual disabilities, as a donor, fundraiser, board member and chairman. One of the trust's residential homes was named "Bev Morrissey House", in honour of Morrissey's wife of 48 years who died in 2007. Morrissey also donated $600,000 for the construction of a 700-seat grandstand at his old school, Christchurch Boys' High.

Morrissey died at his home in Christchurch on 24 July 2013.
