= Herbert Izard =

Herbert Crawford Izard (18 November 1869 – 8 February 1934) was Archdeacon of Singapore from 1910 to 1915.

Izard was born in Wellington, New Zealand and educated at Lancing College and Trinity College, Oxford. He was ordained in 1898 and began his ecclesiastical career with a curacy at Stony Stratford. He then spend fourteen years in the Far East, four at Malacca, and ten in Singapore. On his return to England he was in charge of All Saints, Swanage.

He died in East Preston, West Sussex.
