= Wayne Hodgson =

New Zealand cricketer

Personal information
- Born: 25 June 1959; Nelson, New Zealand
- Died: 20 August 2013 (aged 54); Nelson, New Zealand
- Source: ESPNcricinfo, 31 May 2016

Wayne Hodgson (25 June 1959 – 20 August 2013) was a New Zealand cricketer. He played thirteen first-class and eleven List A matches for Central Districts between 1979 and 1982.
