= Guy Thornton =

New Zealand chaplain and writer (1872–1934)

Guy Dynevor Thornton (born Guy Dinevor Thornton; 11 August 1872 – 13 June 1934) was a notable New Zealand evangelist, army chaplain, and writer. He was born in Wotton-under-Edge, Gloucestershire, England, in 1872.
