= 2013 New Zealand winter storm =

Weather event in New Zealand

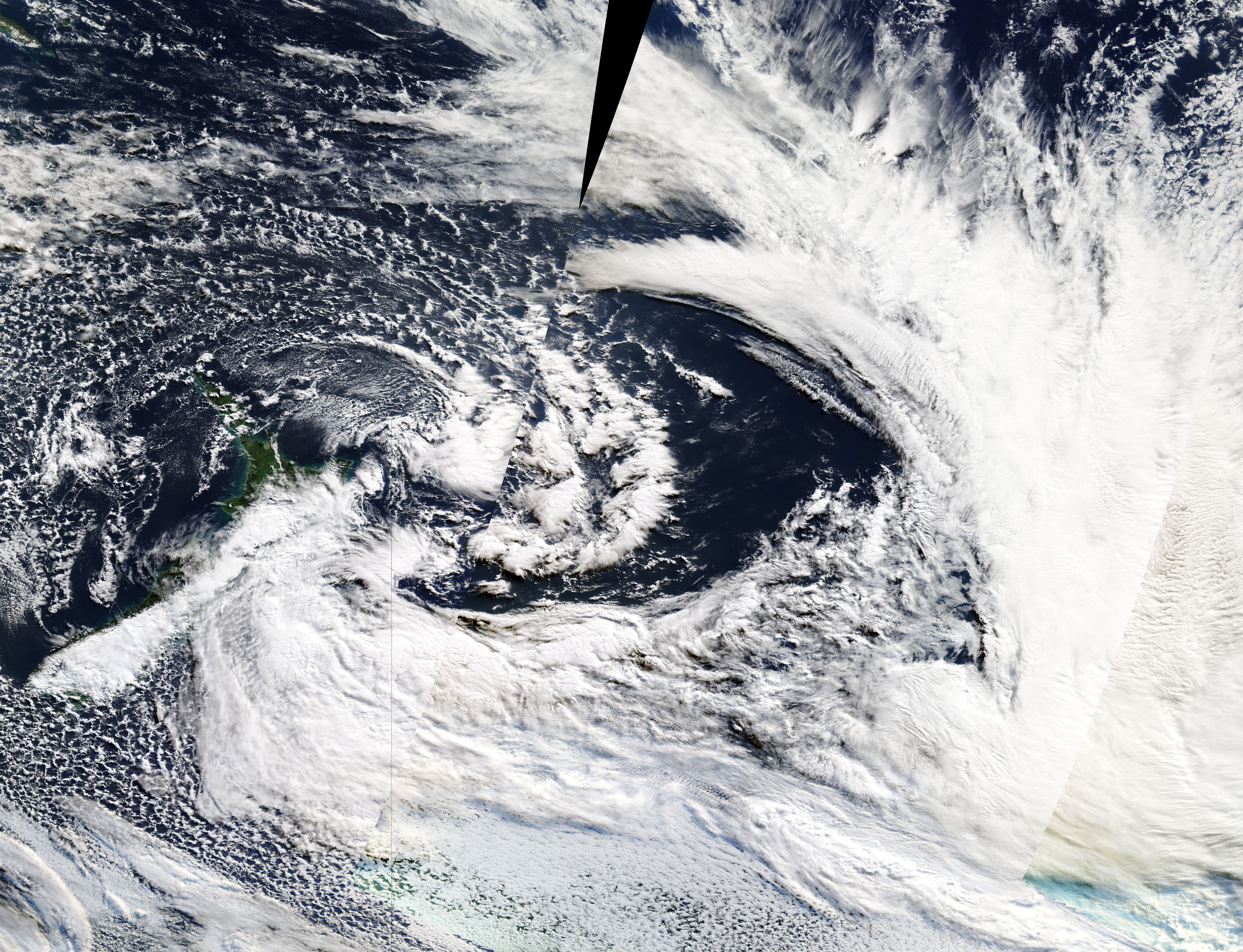
- The extratropical storm affecting New Zealand on 20 June 2013

Meteorological history
- Formed: 19 June 2013
- Dissipated: 22 June 2013

Extratropical cyclone
- Highest winds: 101 kilometres per hour (63 mph) at Wellington Airport
- Highest gusts: 200 kilometres per hour (120 mph) at Mt Kaukau, Khandallah

Overall effects
- Damage: $40 million NZD
- Areas affected: New Zealand

The 2013 New Zealand winter storm was a highly intense extratropical cyclone which affected New Zealand on 20–22 June. The storm brought strong winds and high waves especially around the Wellington Region, and further afield chilling cold temperatures and heavy snow to the South Island. The storm was described by the New Zealand National Institute of Water and Atmospheric Research (NIWA) as an extreme event. The maximum 10-minute average, sustained wind reading, recorded at Wellington airport was 101 km/hour, with individual gusts up to 130–140 km/hour at this location. Winds were equivalent to the strength of a category 1 or 2 hurricane on the Saffir–Simpson hurricane wind scale. Record wave heights of 15 m peak to trough were recorded by a buoy offshore from Baring Head in the Cook Strait. The highest wind gust was 202 km/h, at Mt Kaukau, Wellington.

== Meteorological history ==
On 19 June a surface low pressure just to the northwest of the South Island and at the same time there was a southerly coming in with some cold air at the top of the atmosphere. "The whole thing developed as a massive low that started to move across the west of the South Island, then [20 June] it moved across Cook Strait to create a new low just east of Kaikōura... that was the real kick in pants that caused a clockwise circle of wind." -Associate Professor James Renwick at the School of Geography, Environment and Earth Sciences at Victoria University has researched how polar conditions affect our weather. "To get an event like this, which is pretty extreme, we need the westerly wind that normally blows across New Zealand and the southern oceans to slow down and to buckle into a series of big meanders, north-south waves around the hemisphere." The air was so cold over the country, temperatures dropped to −6˚C in Tekapo, because the isobars stretched all the way to down to the edge of the Antarctic sea ice". This followed bad weather earlier in the month on 4 June which saw winds up to 120 km/h and torrential rain and flooding across the country.

== Impacts ==
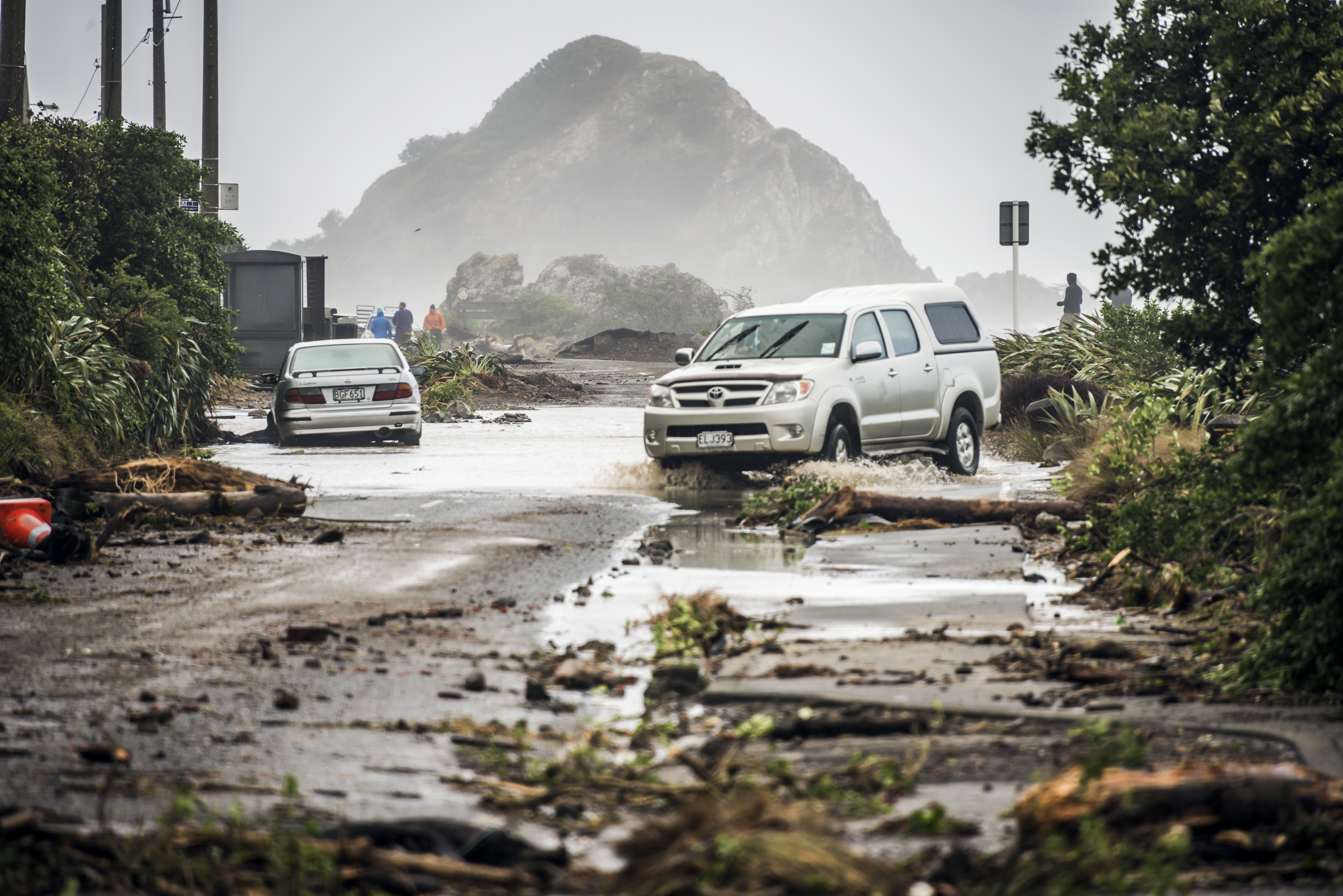
Damage in Ōwhiro Bay, Wellington, due to the storm

High winds struck Central New Zealand on the night of 20 June and morning of 21 June. Wind gusts uprooted trees, ripped roofs off houses, smashed windows and flung trampolines into powerlines in Wellington, Kāpiti Coast and Wairarapa, closing roads and schools across the lower North Island. The Fire Service received 932 emergency calls for help in the lower North Island in the 12 hours to 6 am 21 June. During the Storm residents were advised to stay indoors and not go out by the City Council. Wellington City Council said they had received many reports of flying debris with multiple reports of trees and powerlines down, along with broken windows and structural damage. In the suburb of Kingston a house lost its roof. Radio New Zealand listeners reported that roofing iron was blowing about on roads in Newtown. Emergency services said they were very busy during the storm. The Northern Police Communications Centre said 90% of the calls it received couldn't be answered by its overloaded central branch based in Wellington.

The storm damaged houses, roads and seawalls, as well as closing 150 schools and leaving thousands without power across the country. The storm caused significant damage to the capital's electricity network and resulted in 30,000 homes and businesses without power at its peak. Conditions were so dangerous that some council and power companies stopped their workers from carrying out repairs, until the storm had subsided.

Ocean waves measuring 15 metres (49 ft) from trough to peak were recorded from a buoy about 2 kilometres (1.2 miles) out to sea, near Wellington by NIWA. The waves washed away parts of some coastal roads and seawalls, and were the largest recorded near the capital since measurements began in 1995. Localised coastal flooding also occurred in the Wellington suburbs of Island Bay, Seaview and the city of Porirua. In Lower Hutt the local council estimated a cost of $100,000 NZD to remove debris washed up on the Petone foreshore when parts of the wall were smashed by the storm surge. Logs and driftwood lay scattered around Marine Parade to Eastbourne. The childhood holiday home of writer Katherine Mansfield was severely damaged by massive waves at Days Bay where several homes were completely destroyed.

Racing at Trentham Racecourse was cancelled following the storm and the start of the Wellington LUX light festival was postponed until 22 June.

The Hawkes Bay region saw destructive winds, with a peak gust of 80 km/h recorded at Hawkes Bay Airport on 21 June. Police and council workers spent much of the following weekend cleaning up after the storm, most of which involved uprooted trees and blocked roads. Hawke's Bay Civil Defence manager Trevor Mitchell said the region had got off "pretty lightly" compared to other parts of the country, though some areas suffered localised surface flooding.

The Insurance Council of New Zealand says the storm could be the biggest weather event, insurance-wise, in the lower North Island since the 2004 Manawatū River floods. Measurements placed the storm in the same category as five other major storms recorded in 1961, 1965, 1967, 1974, 1977 and 1985.
