= Allan Johnson (priest) =

Anglican priest (1871–1934)

Allan Macdonald Johnson (1871 – 3 August 1934) was an Anglican priest, most notably Archdeacon of Wellington from 1919 until 1934.

Johnson was educated at Gonville and Caius College, Cambridge and ordained in 1895. After curacies in Coulsdon and Wellington he held incumbencies at Greytown and Masterton. Later he was at St Mark, Wellington then St Paul's Pro-Cathedral in the same city. He was also the Vicar general of the Diocese of Wellington from 1925 to 1929.

Johnson died in Lower Hutt on 3 August 1934.
