= Horace Packe =

Horace Packe (22 March 1865 – 2 December 1934) was the Archdeacon of Southland from 1913 until 1922.

Packe was born in Shangton on 22 March 1865; educated at St Edward's School, Oxford and Worcester College, Oxford and deacon in 1891 and priest in 1892. After curacies in Hastings, Darrington and Georgetown he was Chaplain to the Gold Coast Colony then Vicar of Suva. He came to New Zealand in 1907 and was Vicar of Wakatipu until his appointment as Archdeacon.

Packe died in Gisborne on 2 December 1934.
