= Farrell Temata =

Farrell Temata (c.1944 – 26 April 2013) was a New Zealand rugby union player and coach. He was a prop who played 44 times for the Waikato provincial rugby union team in the late 1960s and 1970s and later was the side's assistant coach from 1992 to 1994. He was assistant coach of the Chiefs Super Rugby team from 2004 to 2006.

On 26 April 2013, at age 68, Temata died due to a heart attack in Brisbane, where he was sideline at a Pukpuks match as their assistant coach.
