= George Witters =

New Zealand farmer and conservationist (1876–1934)

George Witters (11 September 1876 – 22 February 1934) was a notable New Zealand farmer, horticulturist and conservationist. He was born in Makauri, New Zealand, in 1876.
