= Joseph Lawton =

English-born New Zealand cricketer

Personal information
- Full name: Joseph Clement Lawton
- Born: 9 May 1857; Moseley, Birmingham, Warwickshire, England
- Died: 20 January 1934 (aged 76); Blackpool, Lancashire, England
- Height: 5 ft 10 in (1.78 m)
- Bowling: Right-arm medium

Domestic team information
- Years: Team
- 1890/91–1893/94: Otago

Career statistics
Competition	First-class
Matches	11
Runs scored	366
Batting average	19.26
100s/50s	0/3
Top score	82
Balls bowled	3,305
Wickets	70
Bowling average	9.92
5 wickets in innings	4
10 wickets in match	1
Best bowling	7/28
Catches/stumpings	8/–
- Source: CricketArchive, 24 September 2014

Joseph Clement Lawton (9 May 1857 – 20 January 1934) was an English-born New Zealand cricketer and coach. He played first-class cricket for Otago from 1891 to 1894 and played in New Zealand's first representative match. He was the first coach engaged by a New Zealand cricket association.

== Playing career ==
=== 1890–91 to 1892–93 ===
After playing English club cricket as a professional and a few non-first-class matches for Warwickshire, Joseph Lawton was engaged as the coach to the Otago Cricket Association in 1890. He was a useful batsman, but primarily a medium-paced bowler with a low action who bowled with great accuracy and troubled batsmen with his ability to swing the ball. He also imparted so much top-spin that the ball seemed to pick up speed off the pitch: "The vertical accelerating spin must have been tremendous for the ball flew off the wicket, and at you, with wonderful speed."

Otago played only two matches in Lawton's first two seasons. In his debut match in 1890-91 he took 4 for 41 and 6 for 30 in a one-wicket victory over Canterbury. In 1891-92 he took 7 for 28 and 2 for 30 in another victory over Canterbury. In the two matches he took 19 for 129 off 139.3 five-ball overs. Although he batted at number three in these matches he did not reach double-figures.

In 1892-93 he took eight wickets against Hawke's Bay, nine against Auckland, seven against Wellington and six against Canterbury. He finished the season with 30 wickets at an average of 9.53 and was the leading wicket-taker in the New Zealand season. However, he averaged only 10.00 with the bat, with a highest score of 19.

=== 1893–94 ===
Lawton emerged as an all-rounder in 1893–94, scoring 274 runs at 34.25 and coming second in the national aggregates, and taking 21 wickets at 13.33. He began with 52 and 29 (opening the batting), and 4 for 26 and 3 for 49 (opening the bowling), against Auckland. In the next match, for Otago against New South Wales, he made 58 (the highest score in the match) and 0, and took 3 for 53 (the only time in his career that he conceded more than 50 runs in an innings) and 2 for 24. He was selected in the New Zealand side to play New South Wales, which was the first time a New Zealand national team had played. He bowled with customary economy, but took only three wickets in the match – for 74 runs off 77 six-ball overs. He took six wickets in the next match against Canterbury, then finished his career against Hawke's Bay with 82 (his highest score, and the highest score in the match) and no wicket for 7 off 22 five-ball overs.

== Coaching career ==
Lawton was the first coach engaged by a New Zealand cricket association. According to the New Zealand cricket historian Tom Reese, Lawton "revolutionized the game in the south". His beneficent influence on cricket in Otago continued after he ceased playing and even after he returned to England. In the wake of his success, several other coaches from England and Australia were engaged by other associations.

== Later life ==
Lawton returned to England in 1906. He played club cricket in Blackpool until his sixties.
