= William Vorrath =

New Zealand cricketer (1904–1934)

Personal information
- Full name: William Nelson Vorrath
- Born: 21 October 1904; Dunedin, Otago, New Zealand
- Died: 7 June 1934 (aged 29); Dunedin, Otago, New Zealand
- Batting: Left-handed
- Role: Batsman

Domestic team information
- Years: Team
- 1927/28–1929/30: Otago

Career statistics
Competition	First-class
Matches	6
Runs scored	172
Batting average	19.11
100s/50s	1/0
Top score	103*
Catches/stumpings	3/–
- Source: CricketArchive, 5 March 2017

William Nelson Vorrath (21 October 1904 – 7 June 1934) was a New Zealand sportsman. Vorrath played six first-class cricket matches for Otago between the 1927–28 and 1929–30 seasons and represented Otago at rugby league.

Vorrath was born at Dunedin in 1904 into a sporting family. His father had played cricket in Australia, one of his brothers was a jockey and another represented the Otago Rugby Football Union, whilst his sister played lawn tennis. William played club cricket for the Albion Cricket Club in Dunedin, captaining the club for four seasons.

Five of Vorrath's six first-class appearances were made during the 1927–28 season when he played in all of Otago's representative matches. He made his debut against Canterbury in December 1927, opening the batting and making scores of 11 and five. A series of low scores resulted in him dropping down the batting order and it was not until the side's final Plunket Shield match of the season that Vorrath made a significant score, making 103 not out batting at number eight against Wellington towards the end of January, an innings which was called "memorable" in an obituary. This was his only first-class century.

After playing against the touring Australians towards the end of the season, Vorrath made only one further appearance for Otago, opening the batting again in a December 1929 match against Auckland. As well as cricket, Vorrath was a notable rugby player. He played rugby union for the Union club in Dunedin before switching codes to play rugby league. He represented Otago and South Island in the code. He played in trials matches for the New Zealand national team and narrowly missed out on selection for the 1926–27 tour of Great Britain. Illness forced his retirement from the sport.

Professionally Vorrath was a plasterer and worked at the Waitaki Hydro Works in 1933, playing some cricket for North Otago before returning to Dunedin. He died at Dunedin Hospital after a week spent as an in-patient. He was aged 29.
