= Ann O'Donnell (hotel proprietor) =

New Zealand homemaker and hotel proprietor

Ann O'Donnell (née McNamara; c. 1858 – 5 May 1934) was a New Zealand homemaker and hotel proprietor.

== Biography ==
McNamara was born in County Clare, Ireland, to local farmers Kathy and Patrick McNamara, the second youngest of seven children. When a marriage was arranged for McNamara, she strongly opposed it. Instead, she persuaded her siblings to buy her a passage ticket. An old family friend, Mary Clare Moloney, was at St Columbkille's Convent in Hokitika.

McNamara sailed in the Opawa, arriving in Nelson on 28 November 1879. She travelled by coastal ship to Hokitika. Not long after her arrival she met and fell in love with Irish miner, Edward O'Donnell. They were married on 19 October 1881 at St Mary's Church in Hokitika, and settled on a small farm at Woodstock across the Hokitika River, where O'Donnel had a gold claim. Their marriage ended tragically on 15 September 1894 when O'Donnell died suddenly. Ann O'Donnell was left with five daughters and one son to raise. A fiercely independent woman, she remained on her land to look after her family. She fed her children with food she grew herself and nursed them with her own herbal medicines and ointments.

O'Donnell opened a grocery store at Woodstock, most probably in late 1899. In the year 1908, she was granted the lease of the Rose and Thistle Hotel at Blackwater, which she ran with her children. In 1905, the Birthday Reef island had been discovered at Waiuta, several miles inland from Blackwater, and O'Donnell was granted a licence to operate a hotel there in July 1914. Her first hotel was at the former Prohibition Road. In 1915, she built new premises on the main road. This second hotel, the Empire, became well known on the West Coast. Many gathered there to play blackjack or poker games, socialise or listen to the piano or poetry recitations.

Throughout her life, O'Donnell exercised a strong influence over her descendants. All her children and several granddaughters were educated by the Sisters of Mercy. She encouraged her granddaughters to play the piano and her grandsons to take up exercise.

O'Donnell was not a tall woman. Depicted as curly haired with beautiful violet-blue eyes, she always spoke with a soft Irish brogue. Known to many as "Mother" and respected by all, she donated generously to many organisations and community projects. In 1927, she was elected a life honorary member of the Hibernian-Australasian Catholic Benevolent Society and was their first woman member in New Zealand.

O'Donnell died at Waiuta, on 5 May 1934. Her death was mourned by many, who described her as a compassionate and great woman.

== Sources ==
- McDonald, Kathleen C. "O'Donnell, Ann". Dictionary of New Zealand Biography. Ministry for Culture and Heritage.
