= Guy Henderson =

Guy Lochhart Henderson (21 May 1934 – 4 January 2013) was a New Zealand-born Australian classical oboist.

Henderson was the principal oboe in the New Zealand Symphony Orchestra between the 1950s and 1960s. In 1967, he was offered the place of principal oboist in the Sydney Symphony Orchestra. He continued in this position until he retired in 1998. He also played in the Australian Chamber Orchestra's first concert in 1975. He was a member of the New Sydney Woodwind Quintet. Henderson also taught and mentored many oboe students in his career, many of whom have gone on to be successful musicians.

One of his more well known recordings is as the solo oboist in Peter Sculthorpe's "Small Town", played by the Sydney Symphony Orchestra.
