= 1882–83 New Zealand cricket season =

During the 1882–83 New Zealand cricket season, the first class cricket consisted of six matches: an Auckland team went on a tour in December including three games, two in the South Island and in Wellington on the southern tip of the North Island, and three further local clashes.

Canterbury won both their matches in this season, but by close margins (27 runs over Auckland and four runs over Otago). Auckland also had a good record, with three wins and a loss after a first-innings lead to Canterbury, while Wellington won the annual clash with Nelson to end with a 1–1 record.

Matches in Canterbury and Auckland were played with four-ball overs, the remainder with five-ball overs.

== Events ==
=== Auckland's December tour ===
- 2–5 December 1882, Lancaster Park, Christchurch: Canterbury (130 & 180) beat Auckland (162 & 121) by 27 runs.

In the first clash between the sides since 1877, Canterbury fought off Auckland quick bowler William Lankham, who took eleven for 99 on first class debut, and a first-innings deficit of 32 to clinch victory on the final day. David Ashby and George Watson made a fourth-wicket stand of 64, the second largest stand of the game after Watson had made 81 for the second wicket with William Reeves in the first innings, and Canterbury closed with a lead of 123 with five wickets in hand. On the third morning, ten wickets fell for 50 runs, five of them Auckland wickets, and they now required 124 to win. However, William Frith completed a ten-wicket haul to help Canterbury to a 27-run win.

- 8–9 December 1882, Basin Reserve, Wellington: Wellington (94 & 134) lost to Auckland (174 & 55/1) by nine wickets.

Auckland retained their unbeaten record against Wellington, who despite winning the toss trailed by 80 runs on first innings, with Robert Yates' 49 the top score. Lankham continued his good tour with four wickets in the second innings, ending with 18 wickets thus far.

- 13–14 December 1882, Victory Square, Nelson: Nelson (33 & 150) lost to Auckland (89 & 98) by four runs.

Auckland ended the tour with a 2–1 record after a narrow win at Nelson, with Nelson bowler James Wigzell taking his only career five-wicket haul after the Nelson captain put Auckland in to bat. Then the hosts were all out for 33, with four ducks and no double-digit scores, with Lankham taking six wickets and two men run out. Wigzell ended with nine wickets, and Nelson nearly chased down the target of 155; in the final partnership, the nine and eleven batsmen made 22 not out and 30 respectively, before Auckland opening bowler William Buckland struck to seal the win.

Auckland's tour also included four non-first-class matches before the Canterbury match, against teams from Dunedin, Oamaru, Timaru and Ashburton, all of which Auckland won. The 12-man team left Auckland by ship on 16 November, and returned on 17 December.

=== February ===
- 9–12 February 1883, Lancaster Park, Christchurch: Canterbury (131 & 94) beat Otago (134 & 87) by four runs. Otago failed to repeat the previous year's feat, when they broke Canterbury's seven-year winning streak, as Canterbury captain Frederick Wilding took seven for 31 in Otago's chase of 92 to win. On the first day, William Reeves had hit 54 for Canterbury while Frank Cooke took eight wickets, six of them bowled, but Otago had been reduced to 32 for four in chase of 131. Hugh MacNeil's 58 brought parity, Otago leading by three runs when Wilding took the final wicket, but MacNeil chipped in with a couple of wickets on the third morning as Canterbury went from 73 for five to 94. Cooke took most of the other wickets to end with match figures of fifteen for 94. However, he was outshone by Wilding, who had Cooke and six others bowled as Canterbury snatched the win.

=== Taranaki's first class debut ===
- 24 March and 26 March 1883, Auckland Domain, Auckland: Auckland (241) beat Taranaki (63 & 55) by an innings and 123 runs. Taranaki travelled north to Auckland to make their first class debut, which ended with them posting the third and fifth lowest scores of the season, on the way to the heaviest defeat; of Taranaki's batsmen, only three made it into double figures over the two innings, and they were bowled out twice in a day after Auckland had made 241 on the first. It took nine years before Taranaki again played a match with first class status.
- 24 March and 26 March 1883, Basin Reserve, Wellington: Nelson (61 & 47) lost to Wellington (153) by an innings and 47 runs. Though no Wellington batsman made more than James Wood's 32 from number eight, it was enough to beat Nelson by an innings, as captain Joseph Firth and Wood (eight and seven wickets respectively) made inroads with the new ball on both days. Nelson scored at slower than one run an over in the first innings.

== Leading players ==
=== Most runs ===
Name	Team	Mat	Inn	NO	Runs	Avg	100	50
William Barton	Auckland	4	7	1	192	32.00	0	1
John Arneil	Auckland	4	7	1	135	22.50	0	0
William Reeves	Canterbury	2	4	0	128	32.00	0	1
James Testro	Auckland	4	6	1	99	19.80	0	0
Robert Yates	Auckland	4	6	0	92	15.33	0	0

=== Most wickets ===
Name	Team	Mat	Balls	Runs	Wkts	Avg	5wI	10wM
William Lankham	Auckland	4	1011	259	41	6.31	4	3
Frederick Wilding	Canterbury	2	392	102	17	6.00	1	1
Frank Cooke	Otago	1	258	94	15	6.26	2	1
John Gill	Auckland	4	650	210	14	15.00	0	0
Joseph Firth	Wellington	2	540	140	13	10.76	0	0

== Best performances ==
=== Highest scores ===
- 74, William Barton for Auckland v Taranaki (24 March 1883)
- 58, Hugh MacNeil for Otago v Canterbury (9 February and 11 February 1883)
- 54, William Reeves for Canterbury v Otago (9 February 1883)
- 52, George Watson for Canterbury v Auckland (4 December and 5 December 1882)
- 49, Robert Yates for Auckland v Wellington (8 December and 9 December 1882)

=== Best match bowling figures ===
- 15–94, Frank Cooke for Otago v Canterbury (9–12 February 1883)
- 13–35, William Lankham for Auckland v Taranaki (26 March 1883)
- 11–66, Frederick Wilding for Canterbury v Otago (9–12 February 1883)
- 11–99, William Lankham for Auckland v Canterbury (2–5 December 1882)
- 10–56, William Lankham for Auckland v Nelson (13–14 December 1882)

== External sources ==
- CricketArchive – 1882–83 in New Zealand
