= History of cricket in New Zealand to 1890 =

This article describes the history of New Zealand cricket to 1890.

== Historical background ==
European colonisation of New Zealand, particularly by British settlers, began in earnest after 1800. It may safely be assumed that cricket was first played there soon after the English arrived.

The earliest definite reference to cricket in New Zealand appears in 1832 in the diary of Archdeacon Henry Williams. Three years later, HMS Beagle visited the Bay of Islands on its voyage round the globe. Charles Darwin watched a game of cricket at Waimate North being played by freed Maori slaves and the son of a missionary. In The Voyage of the Beagle he wrote: "Several young men redeemed by the missionaries from slavery were employed on the farm. In the evening I saw a party of them at cricket."

== Domestic cricket ==
=== Early developments to 1863–64 ===
The first recorded formal game of cricket in New Zealand took place in Wellington on 28 December 1842. The Wellington Spectator reported the game, played between a "Red" team and a "Blue" team from the Wellington Club. In March 1844 the Examiner in Nelson reported a match between the Surveyors of the Land Company and Nelson.

In March 1860, the first inter-provincial match was played, a one-day match in Wellington between teams representing Wellington and Auckland. Other games soon followed but they were all one-day matches that are not considered to have been first-class.

The inaugural first-class match in New Zealand was played by Otago and Canterbury at the South Dunedin Recreation Ground on 27–29 January 1864. It was arranged as a three-day match with four-ball overs. Canterbury won the toss and decided to field but Otago won by 76 runs.

Despite this being the inaugural first class match in New Zealand, five of the Otago players had previous first class experience, from intercolonial cricket in Australia with Victoria. Nevertheless, it was a debutant, 32-year-old James Fulton, who passed 25 for the first time. John Mace, a former Victoria player, and MacDonald, born in Victoria, then bowled Canterbury out for 34 by the end of the first day. On the second day, Otago batted out 65.1 overs to make 74, before Mace and MacDonald struck with four and six wickets respectively to win the game.

The Otago v Canterbury fixture was played annually from 1864 onwards and became part of the Plunket Shield in the 1911–12 season.

=== 1864–65 ===
The only first class match was the first to be played in Canterbury Province. It was the second Canterbury v Otago game. The match took place on 6 & 7 February 1865 at Hayley Park in Christchurch. Canterbury won by 4 wickets. Otago scored 73 & 61; Canterbury scored 80 & 55–6.

In 1864, Otago had fielded five players with first class experience in Victoria; and a sixth who was born in Victoria. In 1865, those players were gone and the teams were more balanced. As in 1864, Otago captain James Fulton top-scored with 22 in the first innings, but four Canterbury players (including both openers) made double-figure scores and Canterbury took a first innings lead of seven. Canterbury captain Henry Lance then had Fulton stumped for seven, and made 12 in the chase of 55 after coming in at 27 for three. Andrew Bloxham, who played his one and only first-class game, made 18 in the first innings and 10 in the second and was Canterbury's top scorer.

=== 1865–66 ===
On 13 & 14 February at South Dunedin Recreation Ground, Otago v Canterbury. Otago won by 2 wickets. Canterbury scored 68 & 97; Otago scored 105 & 62–8.

Arthur Powys, recalled as captain of Canterbury after missing the 1865 fixture, chose to bat. Otago took a first innings lead of 37 on the first day. Augustus Tennant, playing in his final game, made 24 for Canterbury in the second innings, but a 17-run partnership between Worthington and Murison took Otago within two runs of victory and Worthington managed to get the winning runs.

=== 1866–67 ===
On 7 & 8 February at Hagley Oval in Christchurch, Canterbury v Otago. Otago won by an innings and 37 runs. Canterbury scored 25 & 32; Otago scored 94.

This was the first match played at the Hagley Oval, which became a regular venue up to 1881. The Canterbury totals of 25 and 32 were record lows in New Zealand first-class cricket, while John Hope hit a new first-class best of 28 for Otago as they managed 94 in their first innings, having been asked to bat second. Otago bowler William Downes took 10–22 in the match, while 20-year-old debutant George Young took six wickets for Canterbury.

=== 1867–68 to 1872–73 ===
The Otago v Canterbury series continued through these seasons as the only domestic first-class fixture. In the 1868–69 match Canterbury's Arthur Cotterill scored 72, the first fifty in New Zealand first-class cricket.

=== 1873–74 ===
The number of first-class teams was expanded to five. Otago and Canterbury continued their annual series, and both played their inaugural first-class matches against Auckland. Auckland made their first "southern tour", playing Canterbury, Otago and Wellington in the second half of November 1873, and winning all three matches. Wellington also played the fifth debutant, Nelson.

=== 1874–75 to 1889–90 ===
Auckland, Canterbury, Otago and Wellington played regularly and became established first-class teams.

In 1880–81 George Watson of Canterbury scored New Zealand's first first-class century, finishing on 175. Canterbury totalled 381, which was the highest innings total to that date.

For details of the 1882–83 season, see: 1882–83 New Zealand cricket season

== International tours of New Zealand to 1890 ==
=== George Parr's XI 1863–64 ===
An English team led by George Parr made the first overseas tour of New Zealand in February 1864, playing five matches in the South Island. The local teams fielded 22, so none of the matches are rated first-class. The team toured Australia before and after the New Zealand leg of the tour.

=== James Lillywhite's XI 1876–77 ===
Midway through their tour of Australia, James Lillywhite's team played eight non-first-class matches in New Zealand between late January and early March 1877. They won six matches and drew two. Their next match, on their return to Australia, was the first-ever Test match.

=== Australia 1877–78 ===
Australia toured in January and February 1878, playing seven non-first-class matches against provincial teams, winning four and losing one, against Canterbury.

=== Australia 1880–81 ===
Australia toured in January and February 1881, playing 12 non-first-class matches against provincial teams, winning six and losing one, against Wanganui.

=== Alfred Shaw's XI 1881–82 ===
Between the First and Second Tests of their Australian tour, Shaw's XI toured New Zealand from early January to early February 1882, playing seven non-first-class matches against provincial teams, winning three and drawing four.

=== Tasmania 1883–84 ===
Tasmania toured the South Island in February 1884, playing four first-class matches – two against Otago and two against Canterbury – as well as three other matches. Canterbury won both matches; Otago won one and drew the other.

=== Australia 1886–87 ===
Australia toured in November and December 1886 and played five non-first-class matches against provincial teams, winning two and drawing three.

=== Arthur Shrewsbury's XI 1887–88 ===
After their tour of Australia, Shrewsbury's team played three non-first-class matches in New Zealand in March. All three were drawn.

=== New South Wales 1889–90 ===
New South Wales toured from late January to early March 1890, playing five first-class matches. After drawing the first match against Auckland, they beat Canterbury, Otago, Wellington, and Auckland in a second match. Sydney Callaway took 32 wickets, and later moved to New Zealand, where he played for Canterbury.

== Leading players ==
When the cricket historian Tom Reese compiled his history of early New Zealand cricket, New Zealand Cricket, 1841–1914, in 1927, he selected a 14-man team of the best New Zealand cricketers of the period from 1860 to 1914. His idea was that the team would be a touring team to England or elsewhere.

- David Ashby
- William Barton
- James Baker
- Charles Boxshall
- Frank Cooke
- Herbert De Maus
- Alexander Downes
- Arthur Fisher
- Charlie Frith
- Lancelot Hemus
- Robert Neill
- Dan Reese
- Ernest Upham
- Arnold Williams

Reese added that De Maus had obtained the last batting spot just ahead of Len Cuff, Alfred Holdship and Kinder Tucker. He did not consider for selection those who had established reputations in Australia before they moved to New Zealand, such as Syd Callaway, Alfred Clarke, Harry Graham and Charles Richardson.

== See also ==
- History of cricket in New Zealand
