= David Ashby (cricketer) =

English-born New Zealand cricketer

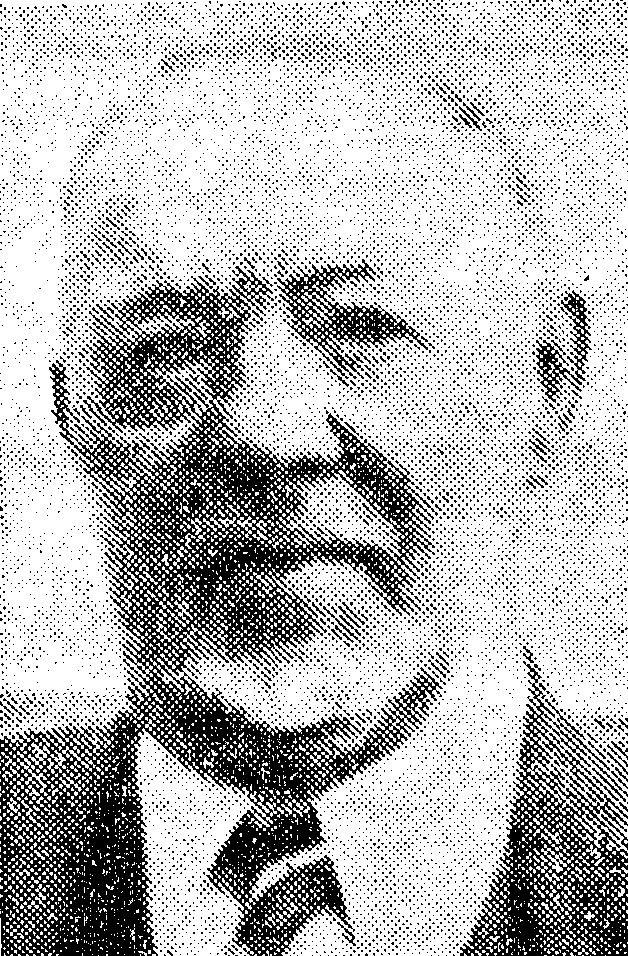

Personal information
- Full name: David Alexander Ashby
- Born: 11 June 1852; Beddington, Surrey, England
- Died: 2 June 1934 (aged 81); Christchurch, New Zealand
- Batting: Right-handed
- Bowling: Right-arm fast-medium

Domestic team information
- Years: Team
- 1874: Surrey
- 1875-76 to 1889-90: Canterbury

Career statistics
Competition	First-class
Matches	17
Runs scored	468
Batting average	17.33
100s/50s	0/2
Top score	59
Balls bowled	1894
Wickets	53
Bowling average	11.05
5 wickets in innings	4
10 wickets in match	1
Best bowling	6/27
Catches/stumpings	12/0
- Source: CricketArchive, 20 February 2017

David Alexander Ashby (11 June 1852 – 2 June 1934) was an English-born cricketer who played first-class cricket for Surrey in England in 1874, and Canterbury in New Zealand from 1876 to 1890.

== Life and career ==
Ashby was born in Surrey and played for the county in 1873 and 1874. He moved to New Zealand, arriving in 1875, and took a job at a Christchurch flour mill operated by William Wood, where he worked for the next 50 years. He became a regular member of the Canterbury team.

An all-rounder who batted at various positions in the order and opened the bowling, Ashby played a major part in Canterbury's spectacular victory over Auckland at the Auckland Domain ground in 1877-78. Canterbury batted first and made 93 (Ashby 12), Auckland replied with 135 (Ashby 4 for 42), and Canterbury made 163 in their second innings (Ashby 32, the second-highest score in the match). Auckland needed 122 to win, but Ashby took 5 for 2, he and Billy Frith (3 for 3) skittling Auckland for 13, a total that included eight byes.

Ashby was a member of the Canterbury side that inflicted the only defeat on the touring Australian team in 1877-78. A month later he took his best bowling figures, 6 for 27 (all bowled) in Canterbury's annual match against Otago, at the South Dunedin Recreation Ground. He made his highest first-class score in 1879-80 at Dunedin's Caledonian Ground. Captaining the side, he won the toss and batted, and scored 59 out of Canterbury's total of 190. He hit one ball out of the ground; the stroke was later measured at 130 yards. He and Billy Frith's brother Charlie then bowled Otago out for 105 and 99, and Canterbury won by nine wickets.

Ashby took part in New Zealand's first overseas cricket tour, when Canterbury visited Victoria and Tasmania in 1878-79 and played several non-first-class matches. After his playing career ended he became an umpire, standing in a first-class match in Christchurch in 1901. He was one of the 14 players chosen in 1927 by the New Zealand cricket historian Tom Reese as the best New Zealand cricketers before the First World War.

Ashby and his wife Mary Jane (née Haddrell), whom he married in Christchurch in April 1882, had a son and three daughters. They lived in the Christchurch suburb of Riccarton. At his funeral all the pall-bearers were employees of Wood Brothers flour mill.
