= Arneil =

Arneil is a surname. Notable people with the surname include:

- Gavin Arneil (1923–2018), Scottish paediatric nephrologist
- John Arneil (1862–1938), New Zealand cricketer
- Rodger Arneil (born 1944), Scotland rugby player
- Steve Arneil (1934–2021), South African-British practitioner
