= Robert Yates =

Robert Yates, Rob Yates or Bob Yates is the name of:

- Robert Yates (NASCAR owner) (1943–2017), NASCAR team owner
  - Robert Yates Racing, the team he owned
- Robert Yates (politician) (1738–1801), Anti-Federalist American politician
- Robert Yates (New Zealand cricketer) (1845–1931), New Zealand cricketer
- Robert Yates (English cricketer) (born 1999), English cricketer
- Robert Lee Yates (born 1952), serial killer
- Robert D. Yates (1857–1885), American draughts champion and medical doctor
- Bob Yates (1938-2013), American football player
