= The Oval, Dunedin =

The Oval may refer to one of two sports grounds in Dunedin, New Zealand:

- Kensington Oval, Dunedin, a sports ground at the southern end of Princes Street
- University Oval, Dunedin, an international cricket ground in Dunedin North
