= Edward Cotterill =

New Zealand cricketer and footballer

Personal information
- Full name: Edward Joseph Cotterill
- Born: 27 June 1856; Christchurch, Canterbury, New Zealand
- Died: 26 April 1904 (aged 47); Christchurch, Canterbury, New Zealand
- Batting: Right-handed
- Relatives: Arthur Cotterill (brother); Henry Cotterill (brother); William Cotterill (brother)

Domestic team information
- Years: Team
- 1880/81–1889/90: Canterbury
- 1895/96: Auckland

Career statistics
Competition	First-class
Matches	7
Runs scored	226
Batting average	28.25
100s/50s	0/1
Top score	75*
Catches/stumpings	3/–
- Source: Cricinfo, 5 March 2019

Edward Joseph Cotterill (27 June 1856 – 26 April 1904) was a New Zealand cricketer who played first-class cricket for Canterbury from 1881 to 1889, and one match for Auckland in 1896.

Edward Cotterill was one of the 17 children of the Rev. George Cotterill, who became Canon of Christchurch. He was educated at Christ's College from 1865 to 1873.

Cotterill was a right-handed batsman. When he made his highest score of 75 not out in Canterbury's victory over Otago in 1885–86, it was the highest score of the short New Zealand first-class season. He captained Canterbury against Otago in 1888–89, scoring 45 in an innings victory. At this point in his career, after five first-class matches, he had scored 202 runs at an average of 50.50.

Cotterill also played football, representing Canterbury as a goalkeeper. He spent his working life with the Union Bank, mostly in Christchurch but with a period in Auckland. He died in Christchurch on 26 April 1904, and was buried at the Barbadoes Street Cemetery.
