= History of cricket in New Zealand from 1945–46 to 1970 =

This article describes the history of New Zealand cricket from the 1945–46 season until 1970.

== Domestic cricket ==
Domestic first-class cricket in New Zealand during this period centred on the Plunket Shield, which was the State Championship from 1906 to 1975.

=== Plunket Shield winners ===
- 1945–46 – Canterbury
- 1946–47 – Auckland
- 1947–48 – Otago
- 1948–49 – Canterbury
- 1949–50 – Wellington
- 1950–51 – Otago
- 1951–52 – Canterbury
- 1952–53 – Otago
- 1953–54 – Central Districts
- 1954–55 – Wellington
- 1955–56 – Canterbury
- 1956–57 – Wellington
- 1957–58 – Otago
- 1958–59 – Auckland
- 1959–60 – Canterbury
- 1960–61 – Wellington
- 1961–62 – Wellington
- 1962–63 – Northern Districts
- 1963–64 – Auckland
- 1964–65 – Canterbury
- 1965–66 – Wellington
- 1966–67 – Central Districts
- 1967–68 – Central Districts
- 1968–69 – Auckland
- 1969–70 – Otago

== International tours of New Zealand ==
=== Australia 1945–46 ===
- 1st Test at Basin Reserve, Wellington – Australia won by an innings and 103 runs

=== England 1946–47 ===
- 1st Test at Lancaster Park, Christchurch – match drawn

=== Australia 1949–50 ===
Between mid-February and early April, while the Australian Test team was touring South Africa, an Australian team captained by Bill Brown played 14 matches, five of which were first-class. They beat Canterbury, Otago and Wellington, and drew against Auckland and New Zealand (not a Test match).

=== England 1950–51 ===
- 1st Test at Lancaster Park, Christchurch – match drawn
- 2nd Test at Basin Reserve, Wellington – England won by 6 wickets

=== West Indies 1951–52 ===
- 1st Test at Lancaster Park, Christchurch – West Indies won by 5 wickets
- 2nd Test at Eden Park, Auckland – match drawn

=== South Africa 1952–53 ===
- 1st Test at Basin Reserve, Wellington – South Africa won by an innings and 180 runs
- 2nd Test at Eden Park, Auckland – match drawn

=== England 1954–55 ===
- 1st Test at Carisbrook, Dunedin – England won by 8 wickets
- 2nd Test at Eden Park, Auckland – England won by an innings and 20 runs

=== West Indies 1955–56 ===
- 1st Test at Carisbrook, Dunedin – West Indies won by an innings and 71 runs
- 2nd Test at Lancaster Park, Christchurch – West Indies won by an innings and 64 runs
- 3rd Test at Basin Reserve, Wellington – West Indies won by 9 wickets
- 4th Test at Eden Park, Auckland – New Zealand won by 190 runs

=== Australia 1956–57 ===
Between mid-February and early April an Australian team captained by Ian Craig played 12 matches, seven of them first-class. The Australians won one and drew two of the three matches against New Zealand (which were not classed as Tests, although both sides were at or close to Test strength), and won the other four first-class matches.

=== England 1958–59 ===
- 1st Test at Lancaster Park, Christchurch – England won by an innings and 99 runs
- 2nd Test at Eden Park, Auckland – match drawn

=== Australia 1959–60 ===
An Australian team captained by Ian Craig toured New Zealand in February and March. None of the Australian players who had been on the recently completed Test tour of India and Pakistan took part. The Australians won one of the four non-Test matches against New Zealand; the other three were drawn. There were two other first-class matches.

=== MCC 1960–61 ===
An English team raised by the Marylebone Cricket Club (MCC) toured New Zealand in the 1960–61 season to play four first-class matches against New Zealand. MCC also played against each of the main provincial teams: Auckland, Wellington, Canterbury, Otago, Central Districts and Northern Districts.

The MCC team was captained by Dennis Silk and included Willie Watson, Eric Russell, Roger Prideaux, Bob Barber, Jim Parks, John Murray, David Allen and David Larter.

See : CricketArchive tour itinerary

=== International XI 1961–62 ===
An International XI toured New Zealand in the 1961–62 season to play two first-class matches. The first match was versus New Zealand at Lancaster Park in Christchurch; and the second match was versus New Zealand Cricket Council president's XI at Eden Park in Auckland. The International XI won the two matches by 8 wickets and 2 wickets respectively.

The International XI was captained by Richie Benaud and included Everton Weekes, Tom Graveney, Bob Simpson and Sonny Ramadhin.

See : CricketArchive tour itinerary

=== England 1962–63 ===
- 1st Test at Eden Park, Auckland – England won by an innings and 215 runs
- 2nd Test at Basin Reserve, Wellington – England won by an innings and 47 runs
- 3rd Test at Lancaster Park, Christchurch – England won by 7 wickets

=== South Africa 1963–64 ===
- 1st Test at Basin Reserve, Wellington – match drawn
- 2nd Test at Carisbrook, Dunedin – match drawn
- 3rd Test at Eden Park, Auckland – match drawn

=== Pakistan 1964–65 ===
- 1st Test at Basin Reserve, Wellington – match drawn
- 2nd Test at Eden Park, Auckland – match drawn
- 3rd Test at Lancaster Park, Christchurch – match drawn

=== England 1965–66 ===
- 1st Test at Lancaster Park, Christchurch – match drawn
- 2nd Test at Carisbrook, Dunedin – match drawn
- 3rd Test at Eden Park, Auckland – match drawn

=== Australia 1966–67 ===
Between mid-February and late March, while the Australian Test team was touring South Africa, an Australian team captained by Les Favell played each of the six provinces (all first-class matches except for Otago) and four matches against New Zealand. The Australians won against Auckland and Otago, and lost to Canterbury and in the first match to New Zealand; the other six matches were drawn.

=== West Indies 1968–69 ===
- 1st Test at Eden Park, Auckland – West Indies won by 5 wickets
- 2nd Test at Basin Reserve, Wellington – New Zealand won by 6 wickets
- 3rd Test at Lancaster Park, Christchurch – match drawn

=== Australia 1969–70 ===
While the Australian Test team was touring South Africa, an Australian team captained by Sam Trimble played three matches against New Zealand, but they were not granted Test status. The Australians also played the New Zealand under-23 team, Central Districts, Northern Districts, Canterbury and Otago. The Australians beat Otago and New Zealand Under-23, and all the other games were drawn.

== Annual reviews ==
- Playfair Cricket Annual 1948 to 1970 editions
- Wisden Cricketers' Almanack 1946 to 1971 editions

== See also ==
- History of cricket in New Zealand
