= History of cricket in New Zealand from 1970–71 to 2000 =

This article describes the history of New Zealand cricket from the 1970–71 season until 2000.

New Zealand's outstanding player in this period was the great fast bowler and all-rounder Richard Hadlee.

== Domestic cricket ==
The Plunket Shield was replaced in 1974 by the Shell Trophy after Shell Oil became the principal sponsor of New Zealand cricket.

=== Plunket Shield winners ===
- 1970–71 – Central Districts
- 1971–72 – Otago
- 1972–73 – Wellington
- 1973–74 – Wellington

=== Shell Trophy winners ===
- 1974–75 – Otago
- 1975–76 – Canterbury
- 1976–77 – Otago
- 1977–78 – Auckland
- 1978–79 – Otago
- 1979–80 – Northern Districts
- 1980–81 – Auckland
- 1981–82 – Wellington
- 1982–83 – Wellington
- 1983–84 – Canterbury
- 1984–85 – Wellington
- 1985–86 – Otago
- 1986–87 – Central Districts
- 1987–88 – Otago
- 1988–89 – Auckland
- 1989–90 – Wellington
- 1990–91 – Auckland
- 1991–92 – Central Districts & Northern Districts shared
- 1992–93 – Northern Districts
- 1993–94 – Canterbury
- 1994–95 – Auckland
- 1995–96 – Auckland
- 1996–97 – Canterbury
- 1997–98 – Canterbury
- 1998–99 – Central Districts Stags
- 1999–2000 – Northern Districts Knights

== International tours of New Zealand ==
=== England 1970–71 ===
- [ 1st Test] at Lancaster Park, Christchurch – England won by 8 wickets
- [ 2nd Test] at Eden Park, Auckland – match drawn

=== Pakistan 1972–73 ===
- [ 1st Test] at Basin Reserve, Wellington – match drawn
- [ 2nd Test] at Carisbrook, Dunedin – Pakistan won by an innings and 166 runs
- [ 3rd Test] at Eden Park, Auckland – match drawn

=== Australia 1973–74 ===
- [ 1st Test] at Basin Reserve, Wellington – match drawn
- [ 2nd Test] at Lancaster Park, Christchurch – New Zealand won by 5 wickets
- [ 3rd Test] at Eden Park, Auckland – Australia won by 297 runs

=== England 1974–75 ===
- [ 1st Test] at Eden Park, Auckland – England won by an innings and 83 runs
- [ 2nd Test] at Lancaster Park, Christchurch – match drawn

=== India 1975–76 ===
- [ 1st Test] at Eden Park, Auckland – India won by 8 wickets
- [ 2nd Test] at Lancaster Park, Christchurch – match drawn
- [ 3rd Test] at Basin Reserve, Wellington – New Zealand won by an innings and 33 runs

=== Australia 1976–77 ===
- [ 1st Test] at Lancaster Park, Christchurch – match drawn
- [ 2nd Test] at Eden Park, Auckland – Australia won by 10 wickets

=== England 1977–78 ===
- [ 1st Test] at Basin Reserve, Wellington – New Zealand won by 72 runs
- [ 2nd Test] at Lancaster Park, Christchurch – England won by 174 runs
- [ 3rd Test] at Eden Park, Auckland – match drawn

=== Pakistan 1978–79 ===
- [ 1st Test] at Lancaster Park, Christchurch – Pakistan won by 128 runs
- [ 2nd Test] at McLean Park, Napier – match drawn
- [ 3rd Test] at Eden Park, Auckland – match drawn

=== India 1980–81 ===
- [ 1st Test] at Basin Reserve, Wellington – New Zealand won by 62 runs
- [ 2nd Test] at Lancaster Park, Christchurch – match drawn
- [ 3rd Test] at Eden Park, Auckland – match drawn

=== Australia 1981–82 ===
- 1st Test at Basin Reserve, Wellington – match drawn
- 2nd Test at Eden Park, Auckland – New Zealand won by 5 wickets
- 3rd Test at Lancaster Park, Christchurch – Australia won by 8 wickets

=== Sri Lanka 1982–83 ===
- [ 1st Test] at Lancaster Park, Christchurch – New Zealand won by an innings and 25 runs
- [ 2nd Test] at Basin Reserve, Wellington – New Zealand won by 6 wickets

=== England 1983–84 ===
- [ 1st Test] at Basin Reserve, Wellington – match drawn
- [ 2nd Test] at Lancaster Park, Christchurch – New Zealand won by an innings and 132 runs
- [ 3rd Test] at Eden Park, Auckland – match drawn

=== Pakistan 1984–85 ===
- [ 1st Test] at Basin Reserve, Wellington – match drawn
- [ 2nd Test] at Eden Park, Auckland – New Zealand won by an innings and 99 runs
- [ 3rd Test] at Carisbrook, Dunedin – New Zealand won by 2 wickets

=== Australia 1985–86 ===
- [ 1st Test] at Basin Reserve, Wellington – match drawn
- [ 2nd Test] at Lancaster Park, Christchurch – match drawn
- [ 3rd Test] at Eden Park, Auckland – New Zealand won by 8 wickets

=== West Indies 1986–87 ===
- [ 1st Test] at Basin Reserve, Wellington – match drawn
- [ 2nd Test] at Eden Park, Auckland – West Indies won by 10 wickets
- [ 3rd Test] at Lancaster Park, Christchurch – New Zealand won by 5 wickets

=== England 1987–88 ===
- [ 1st Test] at Lancaster Park, Christchurch – match drawn
- [ 2nd Test] at Eden Park, Auckland – match drawn
- [ 3rd Test] at Basin Reserve, Wellington – match drawn

=== Pakistan 1988–89 ===
- [ 1st Test] at Carisbrook, Dunedin – game abandoned: heavy rain prevented the toss and any play; called off on the third day
- [ 2nd Test] at Basin Reserve, Wellington – match drawn
- [ 3rd Test] at Eden Park, Auckland – match drawn

=== Australia 1989–90 ===
- [ 1st Test] at Basin Reserve, Wellington – New Zealand won by 9 wickets

=== India 1989–90 ===
- [ 1st Test] at Lancaster Park, Christchurch – New Zealand won by 10 wickets
- [ 2nd Test] at McLean Park, Napier – match drawn
- [ 3rd Test] at Eden Park, Auckland – match drawn

=== Sri Lanka 1990–91 ===
- [ 1st Test] at Basin Reserve, Wellington – match drawn
- [ 2nd Test] at Trust Bank Park, Hamilton – match drawn
- [ 3rd Test] at Eden Park, Auckland – match drawn

=== England 1991–92 ===
- [ 1st Test] at Lancaster Park, Christchurch – England won by an innings and 4 runs
- [ 2nd Test] at Eden Park, Auckland – England won by 168 runs
- [ 3rd Test] at Basin Reserve, Wellington – match drawn

=== Australia 1992–93 ===
- [ 1st Test] at Lancaster Park, Christchurch – Australia won by an innings and 60 runs
- [ 2nd Test] at Basin Reserve, Wellington – match drawn
- [ 3rd Test] at Eden Park, Auckland – New Zealand won by 5 wickets

=== Pakistan 1992–93 ===
- [ 1st Test] at Trust Bank Park, Hamilton – Pakistan won by 33 runs

=== India 1993–94 ===
- [ 1st Test] at Trust Bank Park, Hamilton – match drawn

=== Pakistan 1993–94 ===
- [ 1st Test] at Eden Park, Auckland – Pakistan won by 5 wickets
- [ 2nd Test] at Basin Reserve, Wellington – Pakistan won by an innings and 12 runs
- [ 3rd Test] at Lancaster Park, Christchurch – New Zealand won by 5 wickets

=== South Africa 1994–95 ===
- [ 1st Test] at Eden Park, Auckland – South Africa won by 93 runs

=== Sri Lanka 1994–95 ===
- [ 1st Test] at McLean Park, Napier – Sri Lanka won by 241 runs
- [ 2nd Test] at Carisbrook, Dunedin – match drawn

=== West Indies 1994–95 ===
- [ 1st Test] at Lancaster Park, Christchurch – match drawn
- [ 2nd Test] at Basin Reserve, Wellington – West Indies won by an innings and 322 runs

=== Pakistan 1995–96 ===
- [ 1st Test] at Lancaster Park, Christchurch – Pakistan won by 161 runs

=== Zimbabwe 1995–96 ===
- [ 1st Test] at Trust Bank Park, Hamilton – match drawn
- [ 2nd Test] at Eden Park, Auckland – match drawn

=== England 1996–97 ===
- [ 1st Test] at Eden Park, Auckland – match drawn
- [ 2nd Test] at Basin Reserve, Wellington – England won by an innings and 68 runs
- [ 3rd Test] at Lancaster Park, Christchurch – England won by 4 wickets

=== Sri Lanka 1996–97 ===
- [ 1st Test] at Carisbrook, Dunedin – New Zealand won by an innings and 36 runs
- [ 2nd Test] at Trust Bank Park, Hamilton – New Zealand won by 120 runs

=== Bangladesh 1997–98 ===
Bangladesh toured New Zealand in November and December 1997 and played four first-class and four List A matches. Bangladesh had not yet been granted full international status, so there were no Tests.

=== Zimbabwe 1997–98 ===
- [ 1st Test] at Basin Reserve, Wellington – New Zealand won by 10 wickets
- [ 2nd Test] at Eden Park, Auckland – New Zealand won by an innings and 13 runs

=== India 1998–99 ===
- [ 1st Test] at Carisbrook, Dunedin – game abandoned: no toss was made; abandoned due to persistent rain
- [ 2nd Test] at Basin Reserve, Wellington – New Zealand won by 4 wickets
- [ 3rd Test] at WestpacTrust Park, Hamilton – match drawn

=== South Africa 1998–99 ===
- [ 1st Test] at Eden Park, Auckland – match drawn
- [ 2nd Test] at Jade Stadium, Christchurch – match drawn
- [ 3rd Test] at Basin Reserve, Wellington – South Africa won by 8 wickets

=== Australia 1999–2000 ===
- [ 1st Test] at Eden Park, Auckland – Australia won by 62 runs
- [ 2nd Test] at Basin Reserve, Wellington – Australia won by 6 wickets
- [ 3rd Test] at WestpacTrust Park, Hamilton – Australia won by 6 wickets

=== West Indies 1999–2000 ===
- [ 1st Test] at WestpacTrust Park, Hamilton – New Zealand won by 9 wickets
- [ 2nd Test] at Basin Reserve, Wellington – New Zealand won by an innings and 105 runs

== Annual reviews ==
- Playfair Cricket Annual 1971 to 2000 editions
- Wisden Cricketers' Almanack 1971 to 2000 editions

== See also ==
- History of cricket in New Zealand
