= History of cricket in New Zealand from 2000–01 =

This article describes the history of New Zealand cricket from the 2000–01 season.

Leading players during this period include Stephen Fleming, Shane Bond, Daniel Vettori and Scott Styris.

== Domestic cricket ==
The Shell Trophy was replaced as the first-class domestic championship in 2001 by the State Championship, sponsored by the State Insurance Company.

From 2010 after State sponsorship ceased the competition was renamed as the Plunket Shield.

=== Shell Trophy winners ===
- 2000–01 – Wellington Firebirds

=== State Championship winners ===
- 2001–02 – Auckland Aces
- 2002–03 – Auckland Aces
- 2003–04 – Wellington Firebirds
- 2004–05 – Auckland Aces
- 2005–06 – Central Districts Stags
- 2006–07 – Northern Districts Knights
- 2007–08 – Canterbury Wizards
- 2008–09 – Auckland Aces

=== Plunket Shield winners ===
- 2009–10 – Northern Districts Knights
- 2010–11 – Canterbury Wizards
- 2011–12 – Northern Districts Knights
- 2012–13 – Central Districts Stags
- 2013–14 – Canterbury Wizards
- 2014–15 – Canterbury Kings
- 2015–16 – Auckland Aces
- 2016–17 – Canterbury Kings
- 2017–18 – Central Districts Stags
- 2018–19 – Central Districts Stags
- 2019–20 – Wellington Firebirds

== International tours of New Zealand ==
=== Zimbabwe 2000–01 ===
- [ 1st Test] at Basin Reserve, Wellington – match drawn

=== Sri Lanka 2000–01 ===
This was a limited overs tour only. For details, see: Sri Lankan cricket team in New Zealand in 2000–01.

=== Bangladesh 2001–02 ===
- 1st Test (Westpac Park) – New Zealand won by an innings and 52 runs
- 2nd Test (Basin Reserve) – New Zealand won by an innings and 74 runs

=== England 2001–02 ===
- 1st Test (Jade Stadium, Christchurch) – England won by 98 runs
- 2nd Test (Basin Reserve, Wellington) – match drawn
- 3rd Test (Eden Park, Auckland) – New Zealand won by 78 runs

England also played in 7 limited overs matches including 5 One Day Internationals.

=== India 2002–03 ===
- 1st Test at Basin Reserve, Wellington – New Zealand won by 10 wickets
- 2nd Test at Westpac Park, Hamilton – New Zealand won by 4 wickets

=== Pakistan 2003–04 ===
- 1st Test at Westpac Park, Hamilton – match drawn
- 2nd Test at Basin Reserve, Wellington – Pakistan won by 7 wickets

=== South Africa 2003–04 ===
- [ 1st Test] at Westpac Park, Hamilton – match drawn
- [ 2nd Test] at Eden Park, Auckland – New Zealand won by 9 wickets
- [ 3rd Test] at Basin Reserve, Wellington – South Africa won by 6 wickets

=== Sri Lanka 2004–05 ===
- [ 1st Test] at Westpac Park, Hamilton – game abandoned: tour cancelled following the Indian Ocean tsunami disaster
- [ 2nd Test] at Basin Reserve, Wellington – game abandoned: tour cancelled following the Indian Ocean tsunami disaster

=== Australia 2004–05 ===
- [ 1st Test] at Jade Stadium, Christchurch – Australia won by 9 wickets
- [ 2nd Test] at Basin Reserve, Wellington – match drawn
- [ 3rd Test] at Eden Park, Auckland – Australia won by 9 wickets

=== Sri Lanka 2005–06 ===
- [ 1st Test] at McLean Park, Napier – match drawn
- [ 2nd Test] at Basin Reserve, Wellington – New Zealand won by an innings and 38 runs

See: Sri Lankan cricket team in New Zealand in 2005–06

=== West Indies 2005–06 ===
- [ 1st Test] at Eden Park, Auckland – New Zealand won by 27 runs
- [ 2nd Test] at Basin Reserve, Wellington – New Zealand won by 10 wickets
- [ 3rd Test] at McLean Park, Napier – match drawn

See: West Indies cricket team in New Zealand in 2005–06

=== Australia 2005–06 ===
See : 2005–06 Chappell–Hadlee Trophy

=== Sri Lanka 2006–07 ===
- [ 1st Test] at Jade Stadium, Christchurch – New Zealand won by 5 wickets
- [ 2nd Test] at Basin Reserve, Wellington – Sri Lanka won by 217 runs

See: Sri Lankan cricket team in New Zealand in 2006–07

=== Australia 2006–07 ===
- [ 1st ODI ] at Westpac Stadium, Wellington – New Zealand won by 10 wickets
- [ 2nd ODI ] at Eden Park, Auckland – New Zealand won by 5 wickets
- [ 3rd ODI ] at Seddon Park, Hamilton – New Zealand won by 1 wicket

See: 2006–07 Chappell–Hadlee Trophy

=== Bangladesh 2007–08 ===
ODI series

- [ 1st ODI] New Zealand v Bangladesh at Eden Park, Auckland, 26 December 2007, New Zealand won by 6 wickets
- [ 2nd ODI] New Zealand v Bangladesh at McLean Park, Napier, 28 December 2007, New Zealand won by 102 runs (D/L method)
- [ 3rd ODI] New Zealand v Bangladesh at Queenstown Events Centre, Queenstown, 31 December 2007, New Zealand won by 10 wickets

New Zealand won series 3–0

Test series

- [ 1st Test] New Zealand v Bangladesh at University Oval, Dunedin, 4–6 January 2008, New Zealand won by 9 wickets
- [ 2nd Test] New Zealand v Bangladesh at Basin Reserve, Wellington, 12–14 January 2008, New Zealand won by an innings and 137 runs

New Zealand won series 2–0

=== England 2007–08 ===
T20 series

- [ 1st T20] New Zealand v England at Eden Park, Auckland, 5 February 2008, England won by 32 runs
- [ 2nd T20] New Zealand v England at Jade Stadium, Christchurch – 7 February 2008, England won by 50 runs

England won series 2–0

ODI series

- [ 1st ODI] New Zealand v England at Basin Reserve, Wellington, 9 February 2008, New Zealand won by 6 wickets
- [ 2nd ODI] New Zealand v England at Seddon Park, Hamilton, 12 February 2008, New Zealand won by 10 wickets
- [ 3rd ODI] New Zealand v England at Eden Park, Auckland, 15 February 2008, England won by 6 wickets
- [ 4th ODI] New Zealand v England at McLean Park, Napier, 20 February 2008, Match tied
- [ 5th ODI] New Zealand v England at AMI Stadium, Christchurch, 23 February 2008, New Zealand won by 34 runs

New Zealand won series 3–1

Test series

- [ 1st Test] New Zealand v England at Eden Park, Auckland, 5–9 March 2008, New Zealand won by 189 runs
- [ 2nd Test] New Zealand v England at Basin Reserve, Wellington, 13–17 Mar 2008, England won by 126 runs
- [ 2nd Test] New Zealand v England at McLean Park, Napier, 22–26 Mar 2008, England won by 121 runs

England won series 2–1

=== West Indies 2008–09 ===
Test series

- [ 1st Test] New Zealand v West Indies at University Oval, Dunedin, 11–15 Dec 2008, Match drawn
- [ 2nd Test] New Zealand v West Indies at McLean Park, Napier, 19–23 Dec 2008, Match drawn

Series drawn

T20 series

- [ 1st T20] New Zealand v West Indies at Eden Park, Auckland, 26 December 2008, Match tied (West Indies won the one-over eliminator)
- [ 2nd T20] New Zealand v West Indies at Seddon Park, Hamilton, 28 December 2008, New Zealand won by 36 runs

New Zealand won series 1–0

ODI series

- [ 1st ODI ] at Queenstown Events Centre, Queenstown, 31 Dec 2008, No result
- [ 2nd ODI ] at AMI Stadium, Christchurch, 3 Jan 2009, West Indies won by 5 wickets (D/L method)
- [ 3rd ODI ] at Westpac Stadium, Wellington, 7 Jan 2009, New Zealand won by 7 wickets
- [ 4th ODI ] at Eden Park, Auckland, 10 Jan 2009, No result
- [ 5th ODI ] at McLean Park, Napier, 13 Jan 2009, New Zealand won by 9 runs (D/L method)

New Zealand won series 2–1

=== India 2008–09 ===
T20 series

- [ 1st T20 ] at AMI Stadium, Christchurch, 25 February 2009, New Zealand won by 7 wickets
- [ 2nd T20 ] at Westpac Stadium, Wellington, 27 February 2009, New Zealand won by 5 wickets

New Zealand win series 2–0

ODI series

- [ 1st ODI ] at McLean Park, Napier, 3 Mar 2009, India won by 53 runs
- [ 2nd ODI ] at Westpac Stadium, Wellington, 6 Mar 2009, No result
- [ 3rd ODI ] at AMI Stadium, Christchurch, 8 Mar 2009, India won by 58 runs
- [ 4th ODI ] at Seddon Park, Hamilton, 11 Mar 2009, India won by 84 runs
- [ 5th ODI ] at Eden Park, Auckland, 14 Mar 2009, New Zealand won by 8 runs

India wins series 3–1

Test series

- [ 1st Test ] at Seddon Park, Hamiton, 18–21 Mar 2009, India won by 10 wickets
- [ 2nd Test ] at McLean Park, Napier, 26–30 March 2009, Match drawn
- [ 3rd test ] at Basin Reserve, Wellington, 3–7 Apr 2009, Match drawn due to rain

India wins series 1–0

== See also ==
- History of cricket in New Zealand

== External sources ==
- CricketArchive – New Zealand season itineraries

== Annual reviews ==
- Playfair Cricket Annual – editions from 2001
- Wisden Cricketers' Almanack – editions from 2001
