= William Cotterill =

New Zealand cricketer

Personal information
- Full name: William John Cotterill
- Born: 25 March 1863; Christchurch, Canterbury, New Zealand
- Died: 30 October 1946 (aged 83); Timaru, Canterbury, New Zealand
- Batting: Right-handed
- Relatives: Arthur Cotterill (brother); Henry Cotterill (brother); Edward Cotterill (brother)

Domestic team information
- Years: Team
- 1881–82 to 1893–94: Canterbury

Career statistics
Competition	First-class
Matches	13
Runs scored	336
Batting average	15.27
100s/50s	0/1
Top score	74*
Balls bowled	–
Wickets	–
Bowling average	–
5 wickets in innings	–
10 wickets in match	–
Best bowling	–
Catches/stumpings	6/0
- Source: CricketArchive, 1 March 2019

William John Cotterill (25 March 1863 – 30 October 1946) was a New Zealand cricketer who played first-class cricket for Canterbury from 1882 to 1894.

William Cotterill was one of the 17 children of the Rev. George Cotterill, who became Canon of Christchurch. He and his seven brothers were educated at Christ's College, Christchurch, and five of them played first-class cricket in New Zealand.

Cotterill was a right-handed batsman. He captained the Christ's College cricket team in 1880, scoring 252 runs at an average of 36, which was believed to be the best seasonal batting average by a player at the school to that time. His best first-class score was 74 not out in Canterbury's victory over Otago in 1884–85, when the next-highest score in the match was 36. He was the only Canterbury batsman to play the bowling of Frank Cooke (who took 9 for 73) with any success, and was carried shoulder-high to the pavilion when the innings ended.

Cotterill moved from Christchurch to Invercargill in 1892 in his work for the New Zealand Shipping Company. In 1896 he moved to Timaru to take up the position of Timaru manager for the company. He retired from the position in 1920 after 39 years with the company. While in the position he also performed "with tact and ability" as chairman of the local Wharf Labourers' Dispute Committee.

Cotterill died in Timaru in October 1946, aged 83. His wife Maud predeceased him.
