= History of cricket in New Zealand =

The history of cricket in New Zealand dates back to 1832 as a mention in the diary of Archdeacon Henry Williams.

- History of cricket in New Zealand to 1890
- History of cricket in New Zealand from 1890–91 to 1918
- History of cricket in New Zealand from 1918–19 to 1945
- History of cricket in New Zealand from 1945–46 to 1970
- History of cricket in New Zealand from 1970–71 to 2000
- History of cricket in New Zealand from 2000–01

== See also ==
- Cricket in New Zealand

== See also ==
- Sport in New Zealand
- History of New Zealand
- Cricket in New Zealand
