= George Lankham =

New Zealand cricketer

Personal information
- Full name: George Lankham
- Born: September 6, 1830; Perth, Scotland
- Died: November 4, 1908 (aged 78); Devonport, Auckland, New Zealand
- Bowling: Right-arm slow
- Relatives: William Lankham (son)

Domestic team information
- Years: Team
- 1873/74: Auckland

Career statistics
Competition	FC
Matches	3
Runs scored	2
Batting average	0.50
100s/50s	0/0
Top score	1*
Balls bowled	49
Wickets	3
Bowling average	10.66
5 wickets in innings	0
10 wickets in match	0
Best bowling	3/18
Catches/stumpings	2/0
- Source: Cricketarchive, 15 December 2025

George Lankham (6 September 1830 – 4 November 1908) was a New Zealand cricketer. He played three first-class matches for Auckland in 1873/74.

Lankham was born in Ireland in 1830 before the family moved to Scotland. He went to New Zealand in the 1850s. A round-arm medium-pace bowler, he was a member of Auckland's first first-class team, which toured the country in November–December 1873, winning all three first-class matches.

Lankham and his son William both played in the Auckland team against the touring Australians in February 1881. William had a short but successful cricket career for Auckland before dying of tuberculosis aged 24.

Lankham died after an illness at his son-in-law's house in Devonport, Auckland, in November 1908, aged 78.
