= Sri Lankan cricket team in New Zealand in 2000–01 =

The Sri Lanka national cricket team toured New Zealand in the 2000-01 season to play a five-match LOI series. New Zealand were captained by Stephen Fleming and Sri Lanka were captained by Sanath Jayasuriya.

Sri Lanka won the series convincingly by 4-1, New Zealand saving face by managing to win only the final game.

== One Day Internationals (ODIs) ==
=== 1st ODI ===
31 January 2001 (D/N)
Scorecard

Sri Lanka; 213/8 (50 overs)	v	New Zealand; 152 (42.5 overs)
RP Arnold 50 (65); DL Vettori 3/21 (10 overs)		CZ Harris 39* (78); M Muralitharan 5/30 (7.5 overs)

Sri Lanka won by 61 runs
McLean Park, Napier
Umpires: BF Bowden and AL Hill
Player of the match: M Muralitharan (SL)

- Sri Lanka won the toss and elected to bat.

=== 2nd ODI ===
3 February 2001 (D/N)
Scorecard

New Zealand; 205/8 (50 overs)	v	Sri Lanka; 209/7 (48.3 overs)
CZ Harris 56 (87); DNT Zoysa 4/28 (9 overs)		RP Arnold 78* (90); JDP Oram 2/20 (5 overs)

Sri Lanka won by 3 wickets
WestpacTrust Stadium, Wellington
Umpires: RS Dunne and DM Quested
Player of the match: RP Arnold (SL)

- New Zealand won the toss and elected to bat.
- Sri Lanka innings limited to 49 overs due to their slow over rate.

=== 3rd ODI ===
6 February 2001
Scorecard

New Zealand; 181 (45.4 overs)	v	Sri Lanka; 182/1 (29.5 overs)
CD McMillan 61 (75); HDPK Dharmasena 3/33 (10 overs)		ST Jayasuriya 103 (83); CZ Harris 1/33 (5.5 overs)

Sri Lanka won by 9 wickets
Eden Park, Auckland
Umpires: DB Cowie and EA Watkin
Player of the match: ST Jayasuriya (SL)

- Sri Lanka won the toss and elected to field.
- The match was reduced before play started to 47 overs per side.
- L Vincent (NZ) made his ODI debut.

=== 4th ODI ===
8 February 2001
Scorecard

New Zealand; 182/9 (35 overs)	v	Sri Lanka; 155/5 (31 overs)
SP Fleming 67 (75); DNT Zoysa 3/27 (5 overs)		ST Jayasuriya 52 (53); NJ Astle 2/22 (5 overs)

Sri Lanka won by 3 runs (D/L method)
WestpacTrust Park, Hamilton
Umpires: RS Dunne and EA Watkin
Player of the match: ST Jayasuriya (SL)

- Sri Lanka won the toss and elected to field.
- The match was reduced before play started to 35 overs per side.
- When play was halted Sri Lanka needed to have scored 153 runs to win.

=== 5th ODI ===
11 February 2001
Scorecard

New Zealand; 282/6 (50 overs)	v	Sri Lanka; 269 (49.2 overs)
JDP Oram 59 (57); IS Gallage 2/42 (9 overs)		MS Atapattu 76 (87); JEC Franklin 3/44 (9 overs); CD McMillan 3/44 (8.2 overs)

New Zealand won by 13 runs
Jade Stadium, Christchurch
Umpires: DB Cowie and DM Quested
Player of the match: JDP Oram (NZ)

- Sri Lanka won the toss and elected to field.

== External sources ==
- CricketArchive series itinerary
