= Henry Cotterill (lawyer) =

New Zealand cricketer

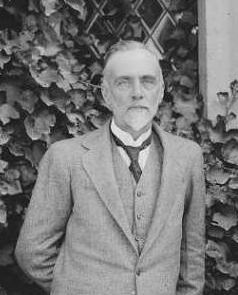
- Cotterill in c. 1920s

Personal information
- Born: 16 March 1855; Lyttelton, Canterbury, New Zealand
- Died: 2 December 1943 (aged 88); Christchurch, New Zealand
- Relatives: Arthur Cotterill (brother); Edward Cotterill (brother); William Cotterill (brother)

Domestic team information
- Years: Team
- 1873–75 to 1884–85: Canterbury

Career statistics
Competition	First-class
Matches	3
Runs scored	13
Batting average	2.16
100s/50s	0/0
Top score	6
Catches/stumpings	1/0
- Source: Cricinfo, 6 March 2019

Henry Cotterill (16 March 1855 – 2 December 1943) was a New Zealand cricketer who played three matches of first-class cricket for Canterbury between 1875 and 1885, and worked as a lawyer in Christchurch for more than 60 years. His law firm, Duncan Cotterill, is the largest in the South Island as of 2020.

== Life and career ==
Born in Lyttelton in 1855, Cotterill was one of the 17 children of the Rev. George Cotterill, who became Canon of Christchurch. He and his seven brothers were educated at Christ's College, Christchurch, and five of them played first-class cricket in New Zealand.

Like his brothers, Cotterill was a batsman, but he did not have the success at cricket that his brothers Arthur, Edward and William enjoyed. He captained Christ's College at cricket and rugby, and was the top New Zealand school student of his year, excelling widely, especially in languages.

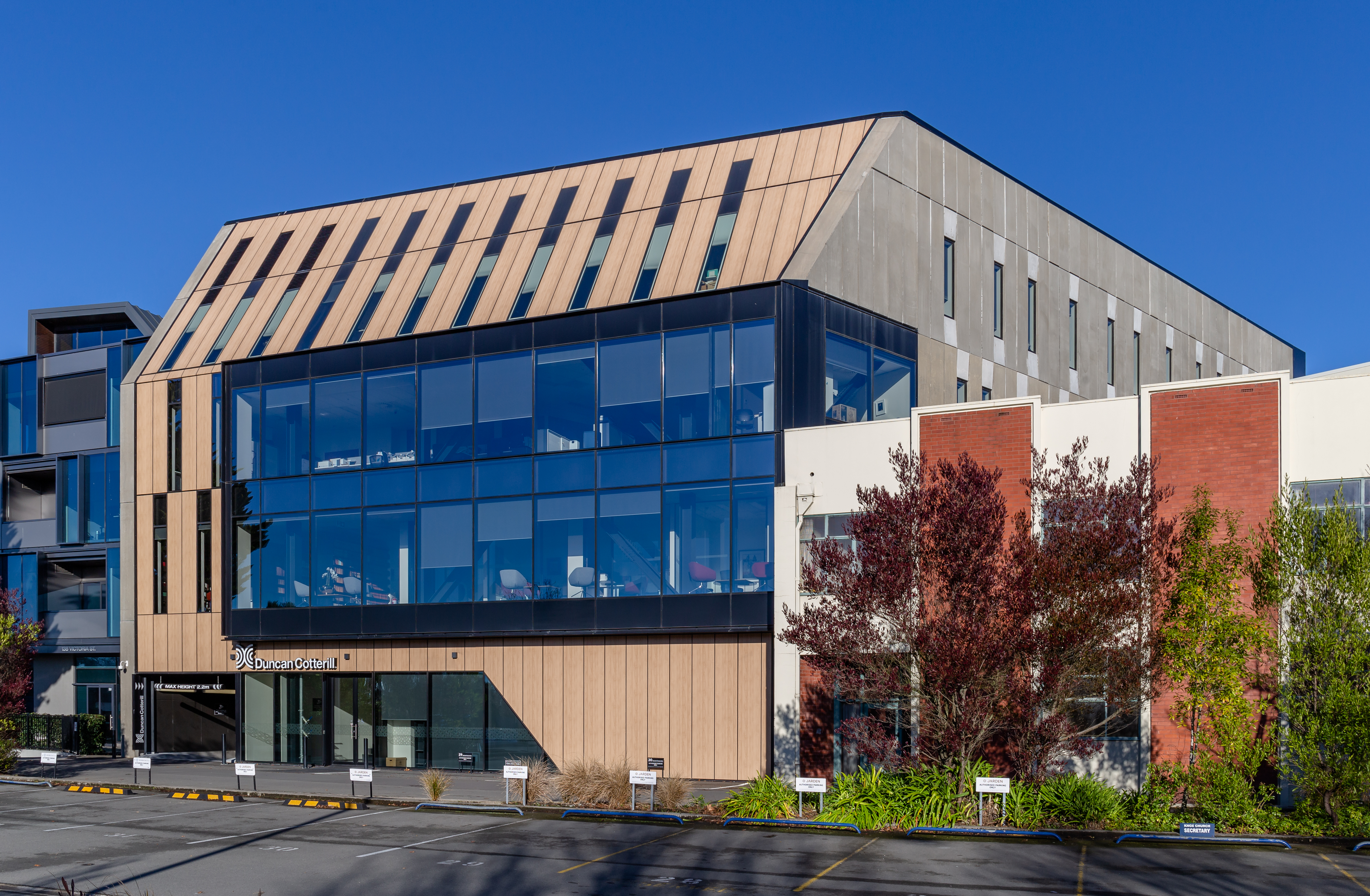
Duncan Cotterill offices in Victoria Street, Christchurch

After studying at Canterbury College, Christchurch, he was admitted as a solicitor and barrister in 1878. In 1879 he joined Thomas Smith Duncan, who had set up his law firm in Lyttelton in 1857. Cotterill was a senior partner of the law firm of Duncan, Cotterill and Company until his death. As of 2020, Duncan Cotterill has offices in Auckland, Wellington, Nelson and Christchurch, and is the largest law firm in the South Island.

Cotterill served on the board of governors of Christ's College from 1896 to 1943, and was also president of the Canterbury Law Society.

His first wife, Nancy, died at the age of 37 in October 1891. In 1893 he married Adela Ronalds. From 1936, the couple lived at Victoria Mansions in central Christchurch. He died in 1943. Adela survived him, along with two sons and a daughter.
