= Francis Watson (cricketer) =

New Zealand cricketer and school teacher

Personal information
- Full name: Francis Edward Watson
- Born: 9 August 1860; Saint Helena
- Died: 27 October 1930 (aged 70); Te Puke, New Zealand
- Role: Batsman
- Relatives: George Watson (brother)

Domestic team information
- Years: Team
- 1879: West Coast

Career statistics
| Competition | FC |
|---|---|
| Matches | 1 |
| Runs scored | 6 |
| Batting average | 6.00 |
| 100s/50s | 0/0 |
| Top score | 6 |
| Catches/stumpings | 0/– |
- Source: CricketArchive, 6 March 2013

Francis Edward Watson (9 August 1860 – 27 October 1930) was a New Zealand cricketer and schoolteacher.

The son of a clergyman, Watson was born on a ship in the bay at Saint Helena. He grew up in India before his family moved to Tasmania. He moved to New Zealand, where he worked as a schoolteacher, becoming headmaster of the Campbell Street School in Palmerston North.

Watson played only a single match at first-class level, representing a combined "West Coast" team, which consisted of players from the western regions of New Zealand's North Island. In the match, against Wellington at the Basin Reserve in December 1879, Watson batted third in the West Coast first innings, scoring six runs. Although his team eventually the match by six wickets, he did not bat a second time.

In retirement, Watson settled on a small farm near Te Puke, in the Bay of Plenty, dying there in October 1930. He and his wife, who survived him, had two daughters and two sons. His older brother, George Watson, was also a cricketer and schoolteacher, and played several matches for Canterbury.
