= William Lankham =

New Zealand cricketer

Personal information
- Born: 4 December 1861; Auckland, New Zealand
- Died: 2 December 1886 (aged 24); Devonport, New Zealand, Auckland
- Bowling: Right-arm medium-fast
- Relatives: George Lankham (father)

Domestic team information
- Years: Team
- 1882/83–1883/84: Auckland

Career statistics
Competition	First-class
Matches	5
Runs scored	90
Batting average	12.85
100s/50s	0/0
Top score	27
Balls bowled	1,367
Wickets	53
Bowling average	7.05
5 wickets in innings	6
10 wickets in match	4
Best bowling	7/13
Catches/stumpings	7/–
- Source: CricketArchive, 29 September 2014

William Lankham (4 December 1861 – 2 December 1886) was a New Zealand cricketer who played five first-class matches for Auckland in the 1880s before his death from tuberculosis at the age of 24. In the history of first-class cricket, he has the highest average of wickets per match among bowlers with 50 wickets or more, with 10.6 wickets per match; the next best average is 8.4.

== Life and career ==
A tall, strongly-built right-arm opening bowler, Lankham had an outstanding season for the Auckland United club in 1880–81, taking 84 wickets at an average of 3.32, helping Auckland United to an undefeated season. He played for the Auckland XXII against the touring English team in 1881–82, taking 3 for 69 off 87 four-ball overs. The English captain, Alfred Shaw, regarded Lankham as the best bowler the tourists faced in New Zealand.

Lankham played his first first-class match in December 1882 for Auckland against Canterbury in Christchurch. He took 7 for 39 in Canterbury's first innings; on the second day, which was also his 21st birthday, he made the second-top score in Auckland's first innings with 27, batting at number ten; then he took 4 for 60. Canterbury nevertheless won by 27 runs. Auckland then travelled to Wellington, where Lankham took 3 for 28 and 4 for 41 in an Auckland victory. The team then crossed Cook Strait again to play Nelson. In a match in which 40 wickets fell for 370 runs, Lankham took 6 for 18 and 4 for 39, and Auckland won by four runs after the Nelson last-wicket pair had put on 50, the highest partnership of the match.

Three months later Taranaki travelled to Auckland to play their initial first-class match, but Lankham was too much for them, bowling unchanged through both innings to take 13 for 35 (7 for 13 and 6 for 22) and dismiss Taranaki for 63 and 55 to give Auckland an innings victory. Lankham finished the season as the leading wicket-taker in New Zealand with 41 wickets at an average of 6.34.

In 1883-84 Auckland played only one first-class match, against Canterbury in Auckland. Lankham bowled for most of the first innings and unchanged in the second to take 6 for 60 and 6 for 54, and Auckland won by four wickets. Later that season, while playing club cricket, he suffered a burst blood vessel, and was never able to play again. He died from tuberculosis two days before his 25th birthday.
