= Charlie Frith (cricketer) =

New Zealand cricketer (1854–1919)

Personal information
- Full name: Charles Frith
- Born: 19 January 1854; Bodmin, Cornwall, England
- Died: 3 April 1919 (aged 65); Dunedin, Otago, New Zealand
- Batting: Right-handed
- Bowling: Right-arm off-break
- Relatives: William Frith (brother)

Domestic team information
- Years: Team
- 1877/78–1880/81: Canterbury
- 1881/82–1889/90: Otago

Career statistics
Competition	First-class
Matches	14
Runs scored	66
Batting average	4.12
100s/50s	0/0
Top score	9
Balls bowled	2,575
Wickets	63
Bowling average	9.60
5 wickets in innings	6
10 wickets in match	1
Best bowling	7/25
Catches/stumpings	12/–
- Source: CricketArchive, 4 October 2014

Charlie Frith (19 January 1854 – 3 April 1919) was an English-born New Zealand cricketer who played first-class cricket for Canterbury and Otago between the 1877–78 and 1889–90 seasons.

== Life and career ==
Charlie Frith's family moved from England to New Zealand in 1867. A "tall, cheery fellow with an easy, full overarm action", Frith was "a right-hand medium-paced bowler, with a slight off-break. His great success as a bowler was his ability to keep a fine length ... he was able, even on a perfect wicket, to quickly wear a spot that enabled him to get work on the ball."

In February 1877 he took 6 for 23 and 3 for 29 for a Canterbury XVIII against James Lillywhite's XI; in the only close match of the English team's six-week tour of New Zealand, Canterbury lost by 23 runs. Some of the English players tried to persuade him to return to England and play county cricket, but he preferred to stay in New Zealand. In 1877-78 Frith was part of the Canterbury XV that beat the Australians, taking the wickets of Bannerman, Horan, Bailey and Gregory, and finishing with match figures of 81–48–55–4 (four-ball overs).

He took 6 for 34 and 4 for 29 when Canterbury beat Otago by nine wickets in 1879–80. In the return match the next season, George Watson scored a record 175 for Canterbury, then Charlie's brother William took 8 for 18 in the first innings and Charlie took 7 for 25 in the second to give Canterbury victory by an innings and 232 runs. In 1883–84, now playing for Otago, he took 5 for 8 in Tasmania's second innings to help Otago to an eight-wicket victory. In senior club cricket in Dunedin in 1886–87, playing for the Phoenix club, he took 111 wickets at an average of 4.13. In his last first-class match, in 1889–90, he bowled unchanged throughout both innings (53.4 five-ball overs in all) to take 5 for 24 and 3 for 18 in a victory over Canterbury.

Dan Reese called him "the first great bowler in New Zealand cricket". He was one of the 14 players chosen in 1927 by the New Zealand cricket historian Tom Reese as the best New Zealand cricketers before the First World War, and one of the 11 Reese chose in 1936 as the best New Zealand team of all time.

Frith umpired four first-class matches in New Zealand between 1885 and 1900. The Otago–Southland match in 1901-02 was played in his benefit, and he was presented with £51 as a result.

He worked as a newspaper compositor, having served his apprenticeship with the Christchurch Press.
