= James Testro =

New Zealand cricketer

Personal information
- Full name: James Charles Testro
- Born: 6 August 1851; Lambeth, Surrey, England
- Died: 30 April 1934 (aged 82); Princes Hill, Melbourne, Australia
- Source: Cricinfo, 25 June 2016

James Charles Testro (6 August 1851 – 30 April 1934) was a New Zealand cricketer who played nine first-class matches for the Auckland in the 1880s.

Testro moved to Australia and with H. Dondey formed a coppersmithing and metal-working company, Dondey & Testro, in South Melbourne in 1891. They invented several water purification devices and a method of fumigating wine casks.

Testro died at his home in the Melbourne suburb of Princes Hill in April 1934, aged 82. He left a wife and two adult children.
