= George Watson (cricketer, born 1855) =

New Zealand cricketer

Personal information
- Born: 1855; Bombay, British India
- Died: 23 November 1884 (aged 29); Christchurch, New Zealand
- Batting: Left-handed
- Relatives: Francis Watson (brother)

Domestic team information
- Years: Team
- 1880–81 to 1883–84: Canterbury

Career statistics
Competition	First-class
Matches	5
Runs scored	367
Batting average	40.77
100s/50s	1/2
Top score	175
Catches/stumpings	1/0
- Source: Cricket Archive, 4 October 2014

George Watson (1855 – 23 November 1884) was a New Zealand cricketer who played first-class cricket for Canterbury from 1881 to 1884. In his first match he scored the first century in New Zealand first-class cricket.

== Early life and career ==
Watson was born in Bombay, the third son of the Rev. Thomas Watson, who was senior chaplain in the Bombay Presidency. His younger brother, Francis Watson (born on Saint Helena in 1860), also played first-class cricket, appearing in a single New Zealand domestic match for a West Coast team.

After moving to Christchurch, George Watson began representing Canterbury in non-first-class matches in 1877, and toured Victoria and Tasmania with the Canterbury team in 1878–79. However, he was not selected for Canterbury's annual first-class match against Otago until 1880–81.

== The first century ==
The match between Canterbury and Otago at Hagley Park in Christchurch in February 1881 was the 19th first-class match between the two, in a series that had begun with New Zealand's first first-class match in 1863–64. It was the 30th first-class match in New Zealand. Matches had been low-scoring affairs. The first individual fifty was not scored until the sixth match, in 1868–69 (72 by Arthur Cotterill of Canterbury), and the highest score was 88 in 1874–75 by Charles Corfe of Canterbury.

Opening the innings, Watson drove the first ball of the match for four. He "laid on to the loose ones without mercy", and after reaching his century with "a long drive for 4" he went "merrily on his way" reported the Christchurch paper The Star, "and if we do not chronicle all his important hits, it is because their number was so great, and even newspaper reports have their limit". He was eventually caught at point for 175 when the score was 300. While the Otago fielding was good, The Star commented, "it would not be going too far to say that their bowling was probably the weakest that has yet been seen in an Interprovincial match". An obituarist recalled: "I remember no innings which contained more good hits and fewer bad ones, than this of Mr Watson. The bowlers failed to get near his wicket at all." He said of Watson's batting in general: "Perhaps the best feature of Mr Watson's batting was its straightness ... His favourite hit was the drive: woe betide the bowler who, deceived by his patient treatment of length balls, presumed to over-pitch!" Watson's score of 175 stood as the highest total by a player on debut in first-class cricket in New Zealand until October 2017, when Brad Schmulian made 203 runs in the first innings for Central Districts in the 2017–18 Plunket Shield season.

Canterbury totalled 381, setting a record for the highest total in New Zealand first-class cricket, and dismissed Otago for 77 (William Frith 8 for 18) and 72 (Charlie Frith 7 for 25) to win by an innings and 232 runs, a record victory margin in New Zealand first-class cricket at the time. After the match Watson was presented with a bat in honour of his innings.

== Later cricket career ==
Watson scored 36 and 52 (top score in the match) when Canterbury beat Auckland by 27 runs in 1882–83. In his last first-class match he again made the highest score, 82, when Canterbury beat Tasmania by one wicket in 1883–84. He had been captain and secretary of the Midland Canterbury Cricket Club in Christchurch for two seasons when he died.

== Personal life ==
Watson was a Bachelor of Arts graduate of Canterbury College and a master at Christ's College, Christchurch. He married Sarah Smith in 1879, and they had two sons. He died at home in Christchurch on 23 November 1884 at the age of 29 after an attack of peritonitis. Sarah never remarried, raised their sons alone, and died in June 1944.
