= John Gill (cricketer) =

New Zealand cricketer

Personal information
- Full name: John George Gill
- Born: 1854; Durham, England
- Died: 14 March 1888 (aged 34); Takapuna, New Zealand
- Role: Bowler

Domestic team information
- Years: Team
- 1882/83–1884/85: Auckland

Career statistics
| Competition | First-class |
|---|---|
| Matches | 6 |
| Runs scored | 24 |
| Batting average | 6.00 |
| 100s/50s | 0/0 |
| Top score | 14 |
| Balls bowled | 774 |
| Wickets | 14 |
| Bowling average | 18.42 |
| 5 wickets in innings | 0 |
| 10 wickets in match | 0 |
| Best bowling | 4/56 |
| Catches/stumpings | 1/– |
- Source: Cricinfo, 30 May 2018

John George Gill (1854 – 14 March 1888) was a New Zealand cricketer. He played six first-class matches for Auckland between 1882 and 1885.

Gill was born in Durham, England. His father was a run-holder in New South Wales. Gill had a farm at Takapuna, which was then on the outskirts of Auckland, where he died suddenly of an apoplexy.
