= Arthur Cotterill =

New Zealand cricketer (1848–1902)

Personal information
- Full name: Arthur James Cotterill
- Born: 22 January 1848; Colney, Norfolk, England
- Died: 3 September 1902 (aged 54); Napier, New Zealand
- Batting: Right-handed
- Relatives: Henry Cotterill (brother); Edward Cotterill (brother); William Cotterill (brother)

Domestic team information
- Years: Team
- 1865–66 to 1873–74: Canterbury

Career statistics
Competition	First-class
Matches	10
Runs scored	258
Batting average	15.17
100s/50s	0/1
Top score	72
Balls bowled	–
Wickets	–
Bowling average	–
5 wickets in innings	–
10 wickets in match	–
Best bowling	–
Catches/stumpings	4/0
- Source: Cricinfo, 8 May 2015

Arthur James Cotterill (22 January 1848 – 3 September 1902) was a New Zealand cricketer and lawyer.

== Early life and career ==
Arthur Cotterill was born in 1848 in Colney, Norfolk, England. He was the eldest of the 17 children of the Rev. George Cotterill, who became Canon of Christchurch. Arthur migrated with his parents to New Zealand, arriving in Lyttelton in November 1851. He and his brothers were all educated at Christ's College, Christchurch. Five of the brothers played first-class cricket in New Zealand.

Arthur made his first-class debut for Canterbury in 1865–66, and remained in the Canterbury team for every match for eight seasons.

== First fifty in New Zealand ==
First-class cricket in New Zealand in the first few years consisted entirely of the annual match between Canterbury and Otago, which began in 1863–64. Scores had been so low that for the first five years the highest individual score was 28, and the highest innings total was 105.

In the sixth match, in 1868–69 at Hagley Oval, Christchurch, Canterbury batted first. Cotterill opened the innings, played scoring shots all around the wicket, and made 72 "by a bit of really scientific cricket" before being fourth out with the score on 122 for 4. Canterbury made 211. The match ended in New Zealand's first draw when Canterbury, needing 72 to win, were 55 for 7 when stumps were drawn on the second and final day. Cotterill was presented with a bat in recognition of his innings.

The next first-class fifty in New Zealand was scored in 1871–72 by George Savile of Canterbury. Cotterill's record score was beaten when Charles Corfe of Canterbury made 88 against Otago in 1874–75, when Canterbury made 354, also a record. The first century was not scored until 1880–81, when George Watson, also of Canterbury, scored 175.

== Later life ==
In his second-last first-class match in 1873–74, Cotterill top-scored for Canterbury in each innings, with 20 and 37, but Auckland won by seven runs. In his last match a few weeks later, he kept wicket for the only time in his career.

Cotterill was admitted to the Bar in 1873. In 1874, he joined John Nathaniel Wilson as a partner and their legal practice was known as Wilson and Cotterill. Wilson retired from the firm in January 1891. In 1877, Cotterill was appointed Crown Prosecutor in Napier, a position he held until his death from pneumonia in 1902. He was a prominent cricket administrator in Hawke's Bay.

On 17 May 1877, Cotterill married Julie Moore Stuart, the eldest daughter of Robert Stuart, the first mayor of Napier, at the city's Cathedral of St John. They had three sons, all of whom played first-class cricket in New Zealand, and one daughter. His wife died in 1883. He was succeeded as Crown Prosecutor in Napier by another cricketer, Hugh Lusk.
