= John Arneil =

New Zealand cricketer (1862–1938)

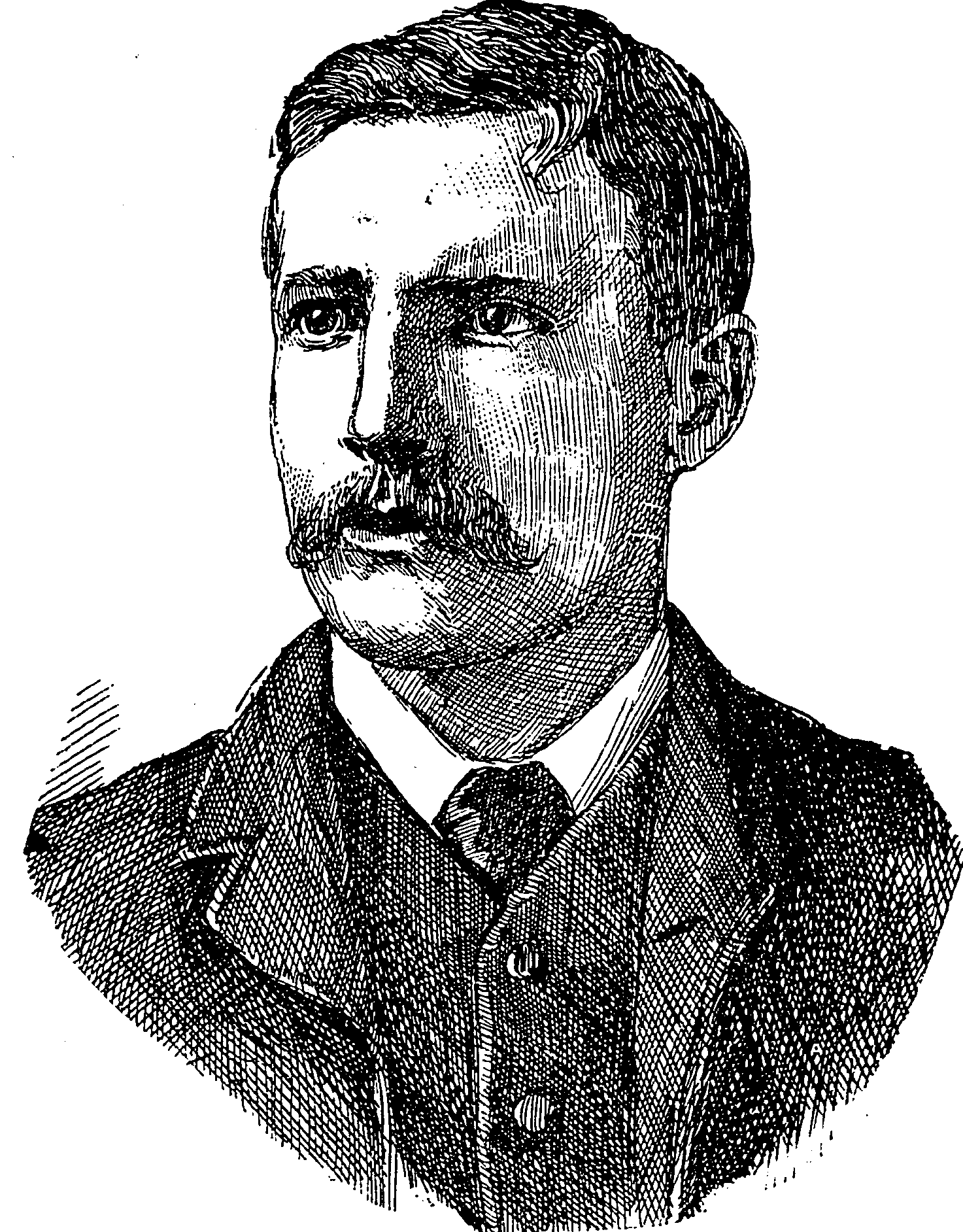
- Arneil in 1894

Personal information
- Born: 1862; India
- Died: 11 August 1938 (aged 75 or 76); Auckland, New Zealand
- Role: Batsman

Domestic team information
- Years: Team
- 1882/83–1893/94: Auckland

Career statistics
Competition	First-class
Matches	9
Runs scored	248
Batting average	17.71
100s/50s	0/1
Top score	59*
Balls bowled	90
Wickets	2
Bowling average	30.00
5 wickets in innings	0
10 wickets in match	0
Best bowling	2/9
Catches/stumpings	3/–
- Source: Cricinfo, 14 April 2019

John Arneil (1862 – 11 August 1938) was a New Zealand cricketer, rugby union player and administrator, and businessman in Auckland.

== Life and career ==
Arneil was born in India in 1862 and moved to New Zealand with his family in 1864. He attended Auckland Grammar School.

He had the rare distinction of captaining Auckland at both rugby and cricket. He was prominent in administering the Auckland Rugby Union, of which he was president from 1915 to 1935. He was also for a time the president of the New Zealand Rugby Union.

Arneil played nine first-class cricket matches for Auckland between 1882 and 1894. He was a prolific batsman in Auckland club and representative cricket despite being unable to practise owing to his hours of work. In 1883–84 he made 59 not out, the top score of the match and of his first-class career, when Auckland chased a target of 152 in the second innings and he steered them to a four-wicket victory over Canterbury.

Arneil joined the Auckland merchants and shipping agents Heather, Roberton Limited in 1880, and was the firm's managing director when he retired in 1933. He married Emily Caradus in 1891. They had three sons and a daughter.
