= Robert Yates (New Zealand cricketer) =

New Zealand cricketer

Personal information
- Full name: Robert John Yates
- Born: c. 1845; Auckland, New Zealand
- Died: 6 October 1931 (aged 85–86); Auckland, New Zealand

Career statistics
Competition	First-class
Matches	15
Runs scored	435
Batting average	16.11
100s/50s	0/1
Top score	50
Catches/stumpings	8/–
- Source: CricketArchive, 22 April 2009

Robert John Yates (c. 1845 – 6 October 1931) was a New Zealand cricketer who played 15 first-class matches between the 1873–74 and 1893–94 seasons, all for Auckland.

A "splendid batsman of the defensive type", Yates scored only one first-class half-century, making precisely 50 against Wellington at Auckland Domain in April 1887. He acted as captain for the only time in this match. When James Lillywhite's XI toured New Zealand in 1877, Yates was the highest scorer against them in any match, with an innings of 31 for an Auckland XXII. In his history of New Zealand cricket, Tom Reese rated Yates as Auckland's best batsman of his era.

He was closely involved with the development of the cricket ground at the Auckland Domain, where Auckland played all their home matches from 1877 to 1913, and he served as groundsman there from 1894 to 1914.

He was a talented violinist, who led the second violins of the Auckland Choral Society orchestra for over 30 years. He and his wife Rose had three sons and four daughters.
