= William Frith (New Zealand cricketer) =

English-born New Zealand cricketer

Personal information
- Full name: William Frith
- Born: 26 June 1856; Edmonton, Middlesex, England
- Died: 19 November 1949 (aged 93); Ashburton, Canterbury, New Zealand
- Batting: Left-handed
- Bowling: Slow left-arm orthodox
- Role: Bowler
- Relatives: Charlie Frith (brother)

Domestic team information
- Years: Team
- 1877/78–1880/81: Canterbury
- 1881/1882: Otago
- 1882/83–1888/89: Canterbury
- 1889/90–1893/94: Wellington

Career statistics
Competition	First-class
Matches	15
Runs scored	243
Batting average	12.15
100s/50s	0/1
Top score	51
Balls bowled	2,501
Wickets	79
Bowling average	10.18
5 wickets in innings	6
10 wickets in match	3
Best bowling	8/18
Catches/stumpings	17/–
- Source: Cricinfo, 13 December 2022

William Frith (26 June 1856 – 19 November 1949) was an English-born New Zealand first-class cricketer who played fifteen matches for Canterbury, Otago and Wellington between 1877 and 1894.

Frith was principally an accurate left-arm bowler, but he was also a useful middle-order batsman "with a style of his own", and one of the most brilliant fieldsmen in New Zealand. In 1880–81 he took 8 for 18 for Canterbury against Otago. In 1889–90 he took four wickets in each innings and made 46 in Wellington's victory over Auckland when nobody else in the match exceeded 30. He bowled successfully against touring Test teams, taking three wickets cheaply for Canterbury against the 1878 Australians and five wickets for Otago against the 1882 English team.

Frith was born in England in 1856 and was employed as a printer and, for a time, as a professional cricketer. He married Sophia Skeltan in 1878 and the marriage produced seven children, but she divorced him in 1904 on the grounds of "habitual drunkenness and cruelty [and] failure to maintain [her] and her family". His brother, Charlie Frith, also played cricket for Otago and Canterbury.
