= Kensington Oval, Dunedin =

Sports ground in Dunedin, New Zealand

Coordinates: 45°53′15.42″S 170°29′53.36″E

Kensington Oval
- The Oval
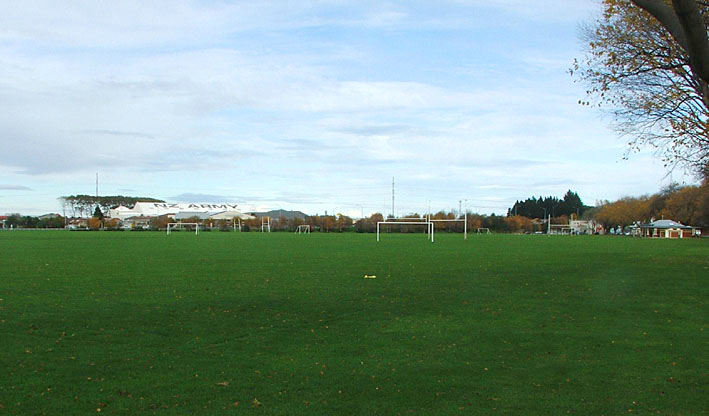
- Kensington Oval (formerly the South Dunedin Recreation Ground)
- Interactive map of Kensington Oval

Ground information
- Location: Kensington, Dunedin, New Zealand
- Country: New Zealand
- Establishment: 1860 (as South Dunedin Recreation Ground)

Team information
Otago	(1864–1878)
- As of 3 November 2011; Source: Ground profile

The Kensington Oval, formerly known as the South Dunedin Recreation Ground, is a park and sports ground in Kensington, Dunedin, New Zealand. It is also known as just The Oval, although this name has become less common in recent years due to the potential confusion with the University Oval in the north of the city.

== Geography ==
The Kensington Oval is officially regarded as the southern end of the city's Town Belt. The park, which is actually roughly triangular in shape, covers 9.25 hectares (22.9 acres). It is bounded by Princes Street, the northern end of Anderson's Bay Road, and the Dunedin Southern Motorway. Its name dates from 22 March 1864, when it was decided to enclose the main cricket pitch within a formal oval. From that time the former name rapidly fell out of use, and has been rarely used since the beginning of the twentieth century.

The city's Boer War memorial, which stands at the northern corner of the Oval, was designed by Carlo Bergamini and erected in November 1906.

== History ==
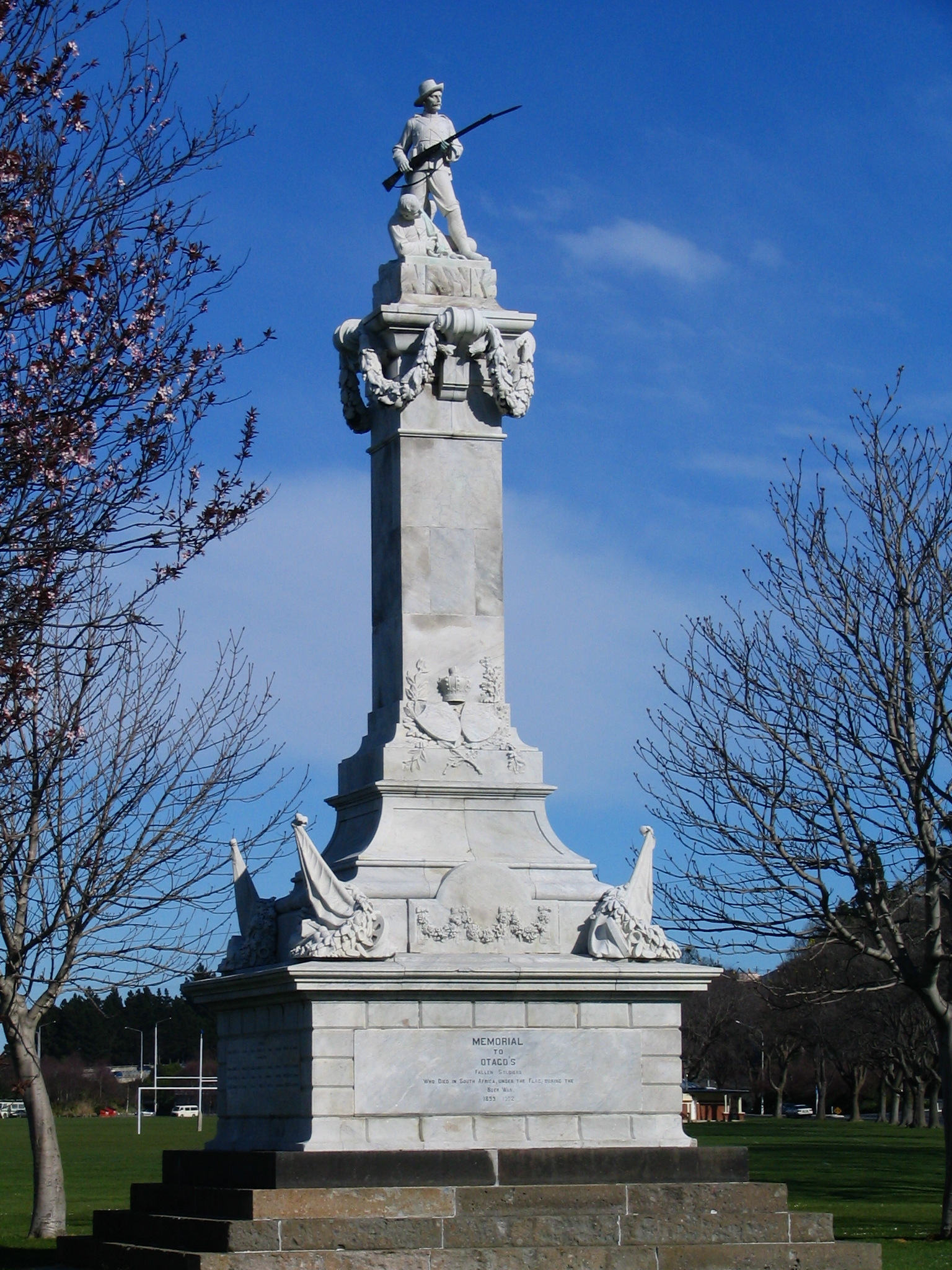
Dunedin's Boer War memorial, at the southern end of the Kensington Oval

The first first-class cricket match in New Zealand was held on the ground in February 1864, when Otago played Canterbury. Otago played eight further first-class matches there, the last of which saw them play Canterbury in February 1878. The condition of the playing surface was generally unsatisfactory, with old tree roots protruding from the ground and the pitch unpredictable and at times dangerous to batsmen. In 1879 the Otago Cricket Association requested that the Dunedin City Council make improvements to the ground. When the Council decided not to make improvements, and refused to restrict access to the ground to cricket only, the Association decided to find another venue to play at. The enclosing bounds of the oval were removed in about 1899.

Although representative matches are no longer played at the Kensington Oval, it is widely used for club, grade, and social cricket, and has two grass and three artificial wickets, as well as a pavilion. It is also used for softball in summer, and for football and rugby union in winter.

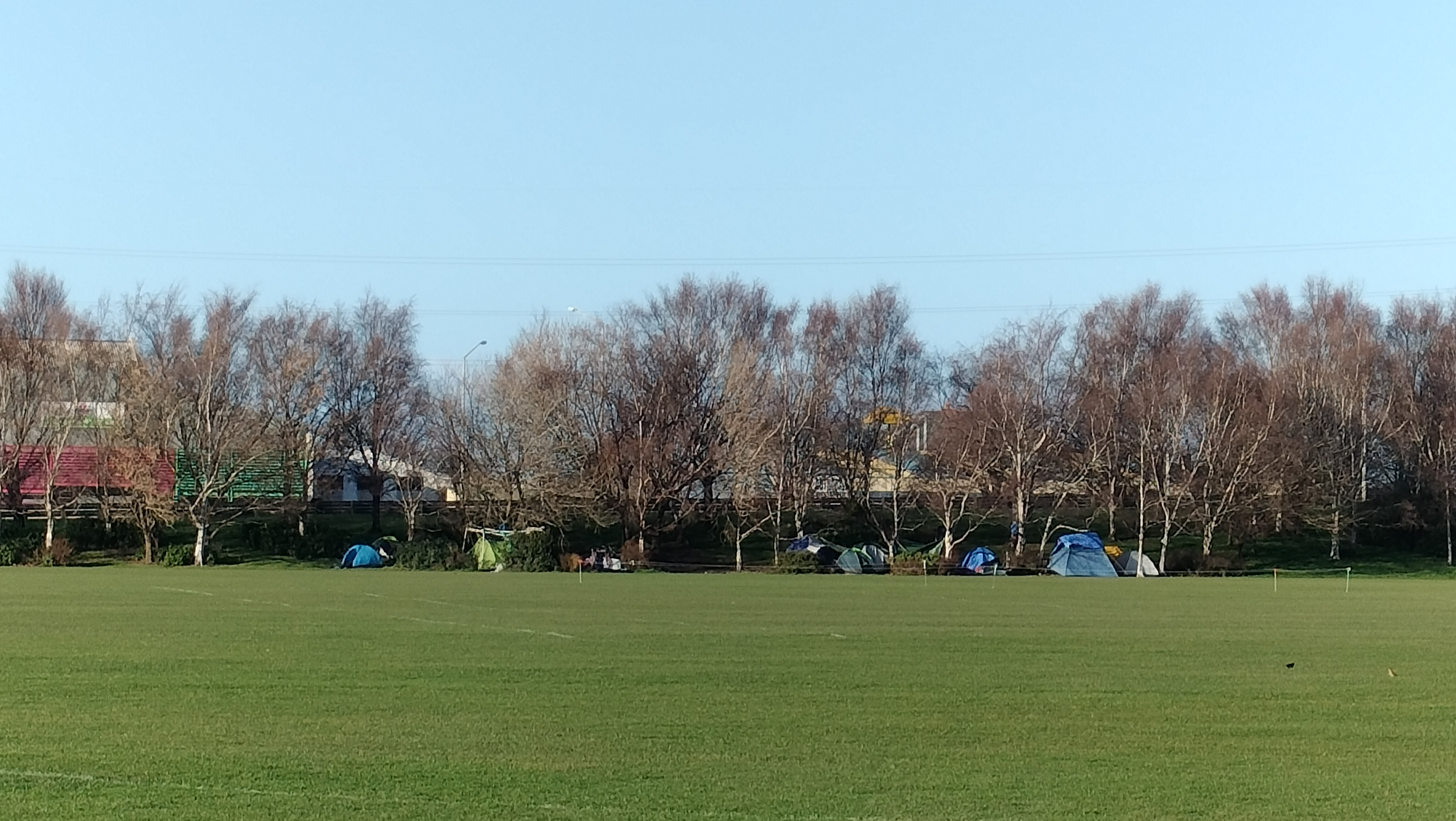
Kensington Oval homeless encampment, June 2025

In mid-May 2024, Dunedin's growing homeless problem led to the emergence of a tent encampment consisting of 11–22 tents in Kensington Oval.
