= List of Northern Districts representative cricketers =

List of cricketers

This is a list of cricketers who have played first-class, List A or Twenty20 cricket for the Northern Districts men's cricket team in New Zealand. Seasons given are the first and last seasons the player appeared for the team in a senior match; the player did not necessarily play in all the intervening seasons.

As of 12 November 2025

== A ==
- Kyle Abbott, 2018/19
- Gren Alabaster, 1960/61–1962/63
- Charles Aldridge, 1977/78–1978/79
- Graeme Aldridge, 1998/99–2014/15
- David Andersen, 1967/68
- Corey Anderson, 2011/12–2018/19
- Peter Anderson, 1977/78–1979/80
- Robert Anderson, 1969/70
- Cody Andrews, 2015/16
- Simon Andrews, 2000/01–2007/08
- Brent Arnel, 2000/01–2017/18

== B ==
- John Bailey, 1965/66
- Mark Bailey, 1989/90–2001/02
- James Baker, 2010/11–2020/21
- Murray Baker, 1974/75
- Rowan Barbour, 1959/60
- Brian Barrett, 1986/87–1989/90
- Hugh Barton, 1957/58
- Peter Barton, 1962/63–1974/75
- Bryan Bayley, 1961/62–1964/65
- Derek Beard, 1987/88–1990/91
- Don Beard, 1961/62–1964/65
- Terence Beatson, 1971/72
- Matthew Bell, 1993/94–1996/97
- Xavier Bell, 2025/26
- Dion Bennett, 1996/97
- Keir Bettley, 2010/11
- John Beuth, 1962/63–1969/70
- Travis Birt, 2014/15
- John Blackmore, 1968/69–1972/73
- Bruce Blair, 1984/85–1985/86
- David Blake, 1992/93
- Trevor Blake, 1964/65
- Peter Bocock, 2016/17–2023/24
- Jono Boult, 2008/09–2016/17
- Trent Boult, 2008/09–2021/22
- Tony Boyle, 1986/87
- Brendon Bracewell, 1983/84–1989/90
- Grant Bradburn, 1985/86–2001/02
- Wynne Bradburn, 1957/58–1968/69
- Aaron Bradley, 1993/94–1994/95
- Roger Bradley, 1990/91
- Roger Broughton, 1980/81–1986/87
- Josh Brown, 2021/22–2025/26
- Dean Brownlie, 2014/15–2020/21
- Graham Burnett, 1993/94–1994/95
- Terence Burns, 1964/65
- Ian Butler, 2001/02–2007/08

== C ==
- Chris Cairns, 1988/89
- Lance Cairns, 1981/82–1987/88
- Roland Calland, 1977/78
- Mark Carrington, 1981/82–1986/87
- John Carson, 1967/68–1968/69
- Robert Carswell, 1957/58
- Joe Carter, 2013/14–2025/26
- Ellis Child, 1958/59
- Murray Child, 1975/76–1986/87
- Rory Christopherson, 2013/14
- Don Clarke, 1956/57–1962/63
- Douglas Clarke, 1957/58–1960/61
- Katene Clarke, 2019/20–2025/26
- Kristian Clarke, 2021/22–2025/26
- Tamati Clarke, 2012/13
- Allen Collier, 1976/77
- Richard Collinge, 1975/76–1977/78
- Barry Cooper, 1980/81–1995/96
- Henry Cooper, 2016/17–2025/26
- Desmond Crene, 1966/67
- Lindsay Crocker, 1982/83–1988/89
- Steven Croft, 2012/13
- Bob Cunis, 1975/76–1976/77
- Paul Curtin, 1980/81

== D ==
- Nathan Daley, 1999/00–2003/04
- Sean Davey, 2017/18
- Te Ahu Davis, 2004/05–2008/09
- Colin de Grandhomme, 2018/19–2022/23
- Richard de Groen, 1990/91–1995/96
- John Derrick, 1986/87
- Anton Devcich, 2004/05–2020/21
- Snehith Devireddy, 2025/26 (Note: Devireddy, who was born in India in 2006, made hi senior debut for Canterbury in November 2025. He had previously played Hawke Cup cricket for Hamilton and under-19 One Day International matches for New Zealand.)
- Cliff Dickeson, 1973/74–1986/87
- Tillakaratne Dilshan, 2009/10
- Robbie Diver, 1997/98–1998/99
- David Donald, 1957/58–1960/61
- Jason Donnelly, 2010/11–2011/12
- Simon Doull, 1989/90–2001/02
- Peter Drysdale, 2021/22–2023/24
- William Duncan, 1957/58
- Brian Dunning, 1961/62–1980/81

== E ==
- Alun Evans, 2004/05–2006/07
- James Everest, 1956/57

== F ==
- Luke Feldman, 2013/14
- Rene Ferdinands, 1998/99
- Desmond Ferrow, 1956/57–1957/58
- Matthew Fisher, 2019/20–2024/25
- Cam Fletcher, 2012/13–2013/14
- Daniel Flynn, 2004/05–2019/20
- James Foster, 2012/13
- Brian Foulds, 1969/70–1970/71
- Bill Fowler, 1979/80–1984/85
- Jeff Freeman, 1972/73–1975/76
- Roddy Fulton, 1973/74–1976/77

== G ==
- Shane Gadsdon, 2008/09
- Herschelle Gibbs, 2010/11
- Grant Gibson, 1968/69–1980/81
- Jake Gibson, 2019/20–2020/21
- Zak Gibson, 2015/16–2025/26
- Gary Giles, 1961/62–1975/76
- Brian Gill, 1969/70
- Stu Gillespie, 1979/80–1982/83
- Eric Gillott, 1971/72–1978/79
- Tony Goodin, 2012/13–2016/17
- Bernard Graham, 1956/57
- Douglas Gray, 1956/57–1959/60
- Rod Griffiths, 1975/76–1980/81
- Rohit Gulati, 2024/25
- John Guy, 1964/65–1972/73

== H ==
- Brett Hampton, 2011/12–2025/26
- Kim Hancock, 1985/86–1986/87
- Malcolm Harding, 1986/87
- Dent Harper, 1958/59
- Daniel Harris, 2013/14–2014/15
- Stuart Harris, 1975/76
- Matthew Hart, 1990/91–2004/05
- Robbie Hart, 1992/93–2003/04
- Norman Harwood, 1959/60
- Brook Hatwell, 2010/11–2011/12
- Jaden Hatwell, 2001/02–2003/04
- Philip Havill, 1969/70
- Roydon Hayes, 1991/92–1995/96
- Graeme Hick, 1987/88–1988/89
- Jono Hickey, 2012/13–2014/15
- Bryan Higgins, 1956/57
- Brandon Hiini, 2011/12
- Ted Hipkiss, 1966/67
- Roneel Hira, 2016/17
- Paul Hodder, 1986/87
- Brad Hodge, 2010/11
- Peter Holland, 1978/79
- William Holt, 1964/65
- Brett Hood, 2000/01
- Rex Hooton, 1968/69–1971/72
- Gareth Hopkins, 1995/96–1997/98
- Nick Horsley, 2002/03–2007/08
- Martin Horton, 1967/68–1970/71
- David Hoskin, 1956/57–1964/65
- Ken Hough, 1956/57
- Alan Hounsell, 1974/75
- Geoff Howarth, 1974/75–1985/86
- Llorne Howell, 2004/05
- David Hussey, 2010/11

== I ==
- Gareth Irwin, 2002/03
- Owen Ivins, 2010/11

== J ==
- Mark Jefferson, 2006/07
- Scott Johnston, 2021/22–2024/25
- Chris Jordan, 2017/18–2018/19

== K ==
- David Kelly, 2002/03
- Nick Kelly, 2015/16–2018/19
- Kevin Kennedy, 1964/65–1974/75
- Ross Kneebone, 1992/93
- Sebastian Kohlhase, 1963/64
- Chris Kuggeleijn, 1975/76–1990/91
- Scott Kuggeleijn, 2013/14–2025/26

== L ==
- Sean Lambly, 1993/94–1994/95
- Maurice Langdon, 1957/58–1964/65
- Ben Laughlin, 2013/14–2017/18
- Trent Lawford, 2016/17
- Jamie Lee, 2003/04
- Jeff Leigh, 1977/78
- Fergus Lellman, 2021/22–2024/25
- Brad Leonard, 2005/06
- Allen Lissette, 1956/57–1962/63
- Dennis Lloyd, 1968/69–1980/81
- Nicholas Lloyd, 1990/91

== M ==
- John McFarlane, 1964/65
- Rex McGill, 1970/71–1971/72
- Peter McGlashan, 2004/05–2011/12
- Peter McGregor, 1962/63–1963/64
- Flynn McGregor-Sumpter, 2023/24
- Grant McKenzie, 1983/84–1990/91
- Mark McKinnon, 1983/84–1988/89
- Stu McLaggan, 1973/74
- John McLeod, 1970/71–1971/72
- Ross McPherson, 1959/60–1970/71
- Aryan Mann, 2025/26
- Hamish Marshall, 1998/99–2011/12
- James Marshall, 1997/98–2012/13
- Bruce Martin, 1999/00–2009/10
- Terence Masters, 1969/70
- Andrew Mathieson, 2010/11
- Dennis Matthews, 1963/64
- Russell Mawhinney, 1985/86–1986/87
- Matthew Maynard, 1990/91–1991/92
- Cameron Merchant, 2007/08–2008/09
- Daryl Mitchell, 2011/12–2019/20
- John Mitchell, 1964/65–1966/67
- Richard Morgan, 1993/94
- Lance Mountain, 1967/68–1973/74
- Gary Murphy, 1973/74

== N ==
- Dion Nash, 1990/91–1997/98
- Tarun Nethula, 2018/19
- Peter Neutze, 1989/90

== O ==
- Kevin O'Brien, 2014/15–2015/16
- Robbie O'Donnell, 2024/25–2025/26
- Alex O'Dowd, 1996/97–1997/98
- Mark Orchard, 2001/02–2007/08
- Brendon Oxenham, 1990/91–1992/93 (Note: Born at Hamilton in 1971, Oxenham played age-group cricket for Northern Districts before making his senior debut for the team in January 1991, scoring 74 runs on debut in his only innings against Central Districts. He played 12 first-class and five List A matches for the team over three seasons, scoring a total of 365 first-class runs and taking three wickets, never improving on his highest score made on debut. In 1993–94 he played two first-class matches for Auckland and in 1994–95 played for Hamilton in the Hawke Cup and for Northern Districts Second XI.)

== P ==
- Bruce Pairaudeau, 1958/59–1966/67
- John Parker, 1972/73–1983/84
- Michael Parlane, 1992/93–2010/11
- Neal Parlane, 1996/97–2000/01
- Adam Parore, 1994/95–1995/96
- Dhiru Patel, 1971/72
- Sandeep Patel, 2021/22–2024/25
- Robin Penhearow, 1964/65–1975/76
- Eric Petrie, 1956/57–1966/67
- Blair Pocock, 1992/93–1996/97
- Michael Pocock, 1965/66
- Neil Pollock, 1981/82–1986/87
- Ben Pomare, 2021/22–2025/26
- Bharat Popli, 2013/14–2024/25
- Dean Potter, 1991/92–1992/93 (Note: Potter was born at Waiuku in 1970 and played age-group cricket for Northern Districts before making his senior debut in 1991–92. He made nine first-class and nine List A appearances for the team over two seasons, taking 17 first-class wickets with his left-arm bowling. He played a further four ListA matches for Auckland in 1997–98 and played Hawke Cup cricket for Auckland-Waitakere during the same season before going on to play in the competition for Northland in 2002–03 and 2003–04.)
- Michael Poultney, 1972/73
- Craig Presland, 1982/83–1984/85
- Tim Pringle, 2022/23–2025/26
- Ashok Puna, 1971/72–1972/73
- Kirti Puna, 1975/76–1978/79
- Tom Puna, 1956/57–1968/69

== R ==
- Brett Randell, 2016/17–2021/22
- Jeet Raval, 2020/21–2024/25
- Nathan Reardon, 2016/17
- Andrew Roberts, 1967/68–1983/84
- Barry Roberts, 1977/78
- Grant Robinson, 2001/02–2007/08
- Gerald Rose, 1967/68
- Craig Ross, 1989/90–1996/97

== S ==
- Mitchell Santner, 2011/12–2024/25
- Clifton Satherley, 1959/60–1960/61
- Ewald Schreuder, 2023/24
- Hector Schuster, 1965/66–1971/72
- Bradley Scott, 2008/09–2012/13
- Steve Scott, 1978/79–1985/86
- Tim Seifert, 2014/15–2025/26
- Adam Seymour, 1994/95
- Terry Shaw, 1956/57–1963/64
- Mike Shrimpton, 1974/75
- Ryan Shutte, 2004/05–2005/06 (Note: Shutte, who was born at Queenstown in South Africa in 1982 and educated at Queen's College Boys' High School in the town, played in five matches for Northern Districts after emigrating to New Zealand in 2003. He had played for Border age-group and B teams in South Africa, and from 2003–04 to 2008–09 played for Hamilton in the Hawke Cup. He is married to squash player Joelle King and put his cricket career on hold to become her manager.)
- Amandeep Singh, 2005/06
- Peter Skelton, 1957/58
- Jim Smith, 1967/68–1971/72
- Kingsley Smith, 1993/94
- Peter Smith, 1956/57
- Ish Sodhi, 2012/13–2021/22
- Addil Somani, 1988/89–1993/94
- Tim Southee, 2006/07–2024/25
- Jason Spice, 1993/94–1996/97
- Brian Spragg, 1987/88–1988/89
- Michael Stephens, 1993/94
- Gerald Stewart, 1968/69
- Alan Stimpson, 1974/75–1978/79
- Peter Stone, 1961/62–1968/69
- Andrew Strauss, 2007/08
- Scott Styris, 1994/95–2014/15
- Murphy Su'a, 1988/89–1989/90
- Bert Sutcliffe, 1962/63–1965/66
- Chris Swanson, 2021/22

== T ==
- Alex Tait, 1992/93–2000/01
- Graeme Tarr, 1957/58–1958/59
- Geoffrey Taylor, 1973/74–1974/75
- Shane Thomson, 1987/88–1996/97
- David Tidmarsh, 1992/93
- Karl Treiber, 1979/80–1987/88
- Chris Tremain, 2013/14
- Daryl Tuffey, 1996/97–2012/13
- John Turnbull, 1959/60
- Glenn Turner, 1976/77
- Roger Twose, 1989/90

== U ==
- Hira Unka, 1968/69–1975/76

== V ==
- Timm van der Gugten, 2015/16
- Sam Varcoe, 2021/22
- Stuart Veitch, 1960/61–1966/67
- Anurag Verma, 2011/12–2021/22
- Daniel Vettori, 1996/97–2014/15

== W ==
- Neil Wagner, 2018/19–2024/25
- Freddy Walker, 2016/17–2024/25
- Joe Walker, 2010/11–2023/24
- Wal Walmsley, 1959/60
- Brendan Ward, 1986/87–1987/88
- David Warner, 2010/11
- John Warrington, 1973/74
- BJ Watling, 2004/05–2020/21
- Kyle Wealleans, 1988/89–1994/95
- Gareth West, 2002/03–2003/04
- Adam Wheater, 2012/13
- David White, 1979/80–1994/95
- Jeremy White, 1972/73–1973/74
- Kevin White, 1978/79
- Kane Williamson, 2007/08–2024/25
- Brad Wilson, 2004/05–2014/15
- Norm Wilson, 1957/58–1960/61
- Nicholas Winter, 2016/17
- John Wright, 1975/76–1983/84
- James Wright, 1958/59
- Mike Wright, 1972/73–1983/84
- Len Wyatt, 1956/57

== Y ==
- Bryan Young, 1983/84–1997/98
- Joseph Yovich, 1996/97–2012/13

== Bibliography ==
- McCarron, Tony (2010). New Zealand Cricketers 1863/64–2010. Cardiff: The Association of Cricket Statisticians and Historians. ISBN 978 1 905138 98 2
