= Dennis Matthews =

Dennis Matthews may refer to:

== Sports ==
- Denny Matthews (born 1942), American sportscaster
- Dennis Matthews (cricketer) (born 1943), New Zealand cricketer
- Dennis Matthews (footballer) (born 1952), Australian rules footballer

== Others ==
- Dennis Matthews (politician), see Gibraltar National Day
- Denis Matthews (1919–1988), British concert pianist

== See also ==
- Dennis Matthies (born 1946), American academic
