= Barry Roberts =

Barry Roberts may refer to:

- Barry Roberts (rugby union) (1933–2017), Australian rugby union player
- Barry Roberts (cricketer) (born 1946), New Zealand cricketer
- Barry Roberts (Australian rules footballer) (born 1937), Australian rules footballer
