= Andy Roberts (New Zealand cricketer) =

New Zealand cricketer

Personal information
- Full name: Andrew Duncan Glenn Roberts
- Born: 6 May 1947; Te Aroha, New Zealand
- Died: 26 October 1989 (aged 42); Wellington, New Zealand
- Batting: Right-handed
- Bowling: Right-arm medium

International information
- National side: New Zealand (1976)
- Test debut (cap 133): 5 February 1976 v India
- Last Test: 26 November 1976 v India
- Only ODI (cap 25): 16 October 1976 v Pakistan

Domestic team information
- Years: Team
- 1967/68–1983/84: Northern Districts

Career statistics
Competition	Test	ODI	FC	LA
Matches	7	1	112	34
Runs scored	254	16	5,865	668
Batting average	23.09	16.00	34.70	30.36
100s/50s	0/1	0/0	7/31	0/7
Top score	84*	16	128*	80
Balls bowled	440	56	2,520	706
Wickets	4	1	84	22
Bowling average	45.50	30.00	30.00	32.09
5 wickets in innings	0	0	1	0
10 wickets in match	0	0	0	0
Best bowling	1/12	1/30	5/30	2/21
Catches/stumpings	4/–	1/–	73/–	13/–
- Source: Cricinfo, 4 February 2017

Andrew Duncan Glenn Roberts (6 May 1947 – 26 October 1989) was a New Zealand Test and ODI cricketer in the 1970s.

Roberts was a middle-order batsman and medium-paced bowler. He played seven Tests, all of them between February and November 1976. His highest Test score was 84 not out in the Second Test against India in November 1976.

Domestically, Roberts played for Northern Districts in the Plunket Shield from 1968 to 1984, and for Waikato, Hamilton and Bay of Plenty in the Hawke Cup from 1968 to 1987. For Northern Districts, Roberts played 104 games and scored 5533 runs, which were both Northern Districts records at the time of his retirement. His highest score was 128 not out against Central Districts in 1979–80, when he added an unbroken 39 for the tenth wicket with Rod Griffiths to give Northern Districts a one-wicket victory.

Roberts captained Bay of Plenty to their first Hawke Cup title in 1985–86, scoring 117 in the first innings in the victory over Hawke's Bay. The next season, after relinquishing the title to Hawke's Bay, Bay of Plenty became the first team to lose and regain the Hawke Cup in the same season when they beat Hawke's Bay again, Roberts, still the team's captain, scoring 75 not out.

Roberts died suddenly in Wellington at the age of 42. At the time, he was Wellington's director of coaching. He was playing club cricket the weekend before he died.
