= Hatwell =

Hatwell is a surname. Notable people with the surname include:

- Brook Hatwell (born 1983), New Zealand cricketer
- Harry Hatwell (1880–1947), Australian politician
- Jaden Hatwell (born 1977), New Zealand cricketer

== See also ==
- Wayne Hatswell (born 1975), English footballer
