= Kneebone =

Kneebone may refer to:

- the patella

It may also refer to:

- Dave Kneebone, American producer
- Frank Kneebone, Australian politician
- Harry Kneebone, Australian politician
- John Kneebone, New Zealand farming leader
- Nova Peris-Kneebone, Australian athlete
- Rachel Kneebone, English artist
- Roger Kneebone, British surgeon
- Ron Kneebone, Australian Rules footballer
- Ross Kneebone, New Zealand cricketer
- Sue Kneebone, Australian artist
- Tom Kneebone, New Zealand-Canadian actor and playwright

== See also ==
- Mr Kneebone, EP by Powderfinger
- Mr. Kneebone's New Digs, book by Ian Wallace (illustrator)
