= Stuart Harris =

Stuart Harris may refer to:

- Stuart Harris (architect) (1920–1977), Scottish architect and historian
- Stuart Harris (author), English author of books and articles about the internet
- Stuart Harris (cricketer) (born 1943), New Zealand cricketer
- Stuart Harris (priest) (1849–1935), Church of England priest and Royal Navy chaplain
- Stuart Harris (political scientist) (1931–2024), Australian public servant

== See also ==
- Stuart Harris-Logan, Scottish ethnographer, folklorist and writer
