= Douglas Gray =

Doug or Douglas Gray may refer to:

- Doug Gray (born 1948), American musician
- Dougie Gray (1905–1972), Scottish footballer
- Douglas Gray (cricketer) (1936–2004), New Zealand cricketer
- Douglas Gray (literary scholar) (1930–2017), New Zealand-born literary scholar
- Douglas Gray (1930–2020), British clown, member of 1950s–1960s comedy troupe The Alberts
