= Mark Orchard =

Mark Orchard may refer to:

- Mark Orchard (cricketer) (born 1978), New Zealand domestic cricketer
- Mark Orchard (footballer) (born 1976), former Australian rules footballer
