= Ivan Wyatt =

New Zealand cricketer

Personal information
- Full name: Ivan Edgar Wyatt
- Born: 5 January 1924; Auckland, New Zealand
- Died: 26 March 2009 (aged 85); Auckland, New Zealand
- Batting: Right-handed
- Relatives: Len Wyatt (brother)

Domestic team information
- Years: Team
- 1947/48: Auckland

Career statistics
| Competition | First-class |
|---|---|
| Matches | 3 |
| Runs scored | 202 |
| Batting average | 33.66 |
| 100s/50s | 0/1 |
| Top score | 67 |
| Catches/stumpings | 3/– |
- Source: ESPNcricinfo, 19 November 2018

Ivan Edgar Wyatt (5 January 1924 – 26 March 2009) was a New Zealand cricketer. He played three first-class matches for Auckland in 1947/48.

Wyatt was a schoolteacher. An opening batsman, he made 67 and 47 in his first first-class match for Auckland against Canterbury and was considered a possible inclusion in the touring team to England in 1949, but he played no first-class cricket after the 1947–48 season. He later represented Northland and Nelson in the Hawke Cup. When Nelson withstood a challenge from Poverty Bay in 1958-59 he scored 202 in Nelson's first innings.
