= John McFarlane (disambiguation) =

John McFarlane (born 1947) is a British businessman.

John McFarlane may also refer to:

- John McFarlane (Australian politician) (1854–1915)
- John McFarlane (cricketer) (1933-2010), New Zealand cricketer
- John McFarlane (footballer, born 1905) (1905–?), Scottish footballer (Liverpool FC)
- John McFarlane (footballer, born 1899) (1899–1956), Scottish footballer (Celtic FC, Middlesbrough FC)
- John McFarlane of Sluts of Trust
- John Hector McFarlane, a fictional character

== See also ==
- John MacFarlane (disambiguation)
- John McFarlan, Ontario MPP for Middlesex East riding, 1912–1919
