= Kingsley Smith =

Kingsley Smith may refer to:

- Kingsley Smith (cricketer)
- Kingsley Smith (politician)
