= David Hoskin =

New Zealand cricketer

Personal information
- Full name: David Craig Hoskin
- Born: 16 October 1935 (age 91); Christchurch, New Zealand
- Batting: Right-handed
- Bowling: Right-arm medium-fast

Domestic team information
- Years: Team
- 1956/57–1964/65: Northern Districts

Career statistics
Competition	First-class
Matches	23
Runs scored	126
Batting average	7.87
100s/50s	0/0
Top score	23
Balls bowled	3,919
Wickets	60
Bowling average	27.70
5 wickets in innings	2
10 wickets in match	0
Best bowling	7/33
Catches/stumpings	13/–
- Source: Cricinfo, 5 November 2017

David Craig Hoskin (born 16 October 1935) is a New Zealand former cricketer who played first-class cricket for Northern Districts from 1956 to 1965. He was President of New Zealand Cricket from 2000 to 2003.

== Playing career ==
A right-arm medium-fast bowler, Hoskin was the first person to bowl for Northern Districts in first-class cricket. He opened the bowling in their first Plunket Shield match, against Auckland, on Boxing Day 1956. His best season was 1961–62, when he took 17 wickets at an average of 17.82, including his best figures of 7 for 33 against Wellington, when Northern Districts dismissed Wellington for 80 in the second innings. In 1962-63 he was a member of the first Northern Districts team to win the Plunket Shield. He took 5 for 71 against Auckland in the first match of the season.

Hoskin also played Hawke Cup cricket for Waikato from 1956 to 1966. He was a member of the Waikato team that took the title from Northland in 1956-57 when he took 5 for 33 and 5 for 55 in a 102-run victory, a few days before his first-class debut.

== Administrative career ==
Hoskin has been involved in voluntary cricket administration since his schooldays at Hamilton High School, when he was the school delegate to the Hamilton Cricket Association. Since then he has been part of the Waikato Cricket Association, the Northern Districts Cricket Association and New Zealand Cricket. His administrative career culminated in a three-year term as President of New Zealand Cricket from 2000 to 2003.
