= Craig Ross (disambiguation) =

Craig Ross is an American guitarist.

Craig Ross may also refer to:

- Craig Ross (Canterbury cricketer) (born 1980), New Zealand cricketer
- Craig Ross (Northern Districts cricketer) (born 1970), New Zealand cricketer
- Craig Ross (footballer) (born 1990), English footballer
- Craig Ross (darts player) (born 1970), darts player from New Zealand
- Craig Ross Jr., American film and television director
