= Kuggeleijn =

Kuggeleijn is a surname. Notable people with the surname include:

- Chris Kuggeleijn (born 1956), New Zealand cricketer
- Scott Kuggeleijn (born 1992), New Zealand cricketer and son of Chris
