= Hamish Barton =

Argentine cricketer (born 1976)

Personal information
- Full name: Hamish Dymock Barton
- Born: 16 July 1976 (age 50); Gisborne, New Zealand
- Batting: Left-handed
- Bowling: Right-arm off break
- Relatives: Peter Barton (father); Hugh Barton (uncle)

Career statistics
Competition	First-class	List A
Matches	17	21
Runs scored	572	253
Batting average	23.83	18.07
100s/50s	0/5	0/0
Top score	76*	42
Balls bowled	1,601	534
Wickets	16	7
Bowling average	55.50	72.85
5 wickets in innings	0	0
10 wickets in match	0	0
Best bowling	3/60	2/47
Catches/stumpings	6/–	9/–
- Source: CricInfo, 25 August 2009

Hamish Dymock Barton (born 16 July 1976) is a New Zealand cricket who played first-class cricket for Auckland and Canterbury. He also played for the and Argentina national cricket team. Barton played as a left-handed batsman and right-arm off break bowler.

Barton's father Peter and his uncle Hugh also played first class cricket in New Zealand.
