= Selwyn Blackmore =

New Zealand cricketer (born 1972)

Personal information
- Full name: Selwyn John Blackmore
- Born: 7 September 1972 (age 54); Whangārei, New Zealand
- Batting: Right-handed
- Bowling: Right-arm medium
- Relatives: John Blackmore (father)

Domestic team information
- Years: Team
- 1991/92–2001/02: Wellington

Career statistics
Competition	First-class
Matches	29
Runs scored	1,396
Batting average	29.70
100s/50s	2/7
Top score	107*
Balls bowled	6
Wickets	0
Bowling average	–
5 wickets in innings	–
10 wickets in match	–
Best bowling	–
Catches/stumpings	21/–
- Source: Cricinfo, 11 January 2024

Selwyn John Blackmore (born 6 September 1972) is a former New Zealand cricketer, who played 29 first-class matches for Wellington between 1992 and 2002. He also played for Hutt Valley in the Hawke Cup.

Blackmore was born in Whangārei. His father, John Blackmore, played for Northern Districts from 1968 to 1973.

Selwyn Blackmore was a batsman who usually opened the innings. His highest first-class score was 107 not out against Otago in his second first-class match. He captained Hutt Valley to victory in a Hawke Cup challenge match against Nelson in 1995–96, scoring 146.
