= American Cinema Editors Awards 2013 =

63rd ACE Eddie Awards
- Presented by: American Cinema Editors
- Date: February 16, 2013
- Site: The Beverly Hilton, Beverly Hills, California

Highlights
- Best Film: Drama: Argo
- Best Film: Musical or Comedy: Silver Linings Playbook

The 63rd American Cinema Editors Eddie Awards were presented on Saturday, February 16, 2013 at the Beverly Hilton Hotel, and honored the best editing in film and television of 2012.

Nominees were announced on January 16, 2013.

== Winners and nominees ==
=== Film ===
Best Edited Feature Film – Dramatic:

William Goldenberg - Argo

- Tim Squyres - Life of Pi
- Michael Kahn - Lincoln
- Stuart Baird - Skyfall
- Dylan Tichenor and William Goldenberg - Zero Dark Thirty

Best Edited Feature Film – Comedy or Musical:

Jay Cassidy and Crispin Struthers - Silver Linings Playbook

- Chris Gill - The Best Exotic Marigold Hotel
- Melanie Ann Oliver and Chris Dickens - Les Misérables
- Andrew Weisblum - Moonrise Kingdom
- Jeff Freeman - Ted

Best Edited Animated Feature Film:

Nicolas C. Smith - Brave

- Chris Lebenzon and Mark Solomon - Frankenweenie
- Joyce Arrastia - Rise of the Guardians
- Tim Mertens - Wreck-It Ralph

Best Edited Documentary (Feature):

Malik Bendjelloul - Searching for Sugar Man

- Ron Fricke and Mark Magidson - Samsara
- Billy McMillin - West of Memphis

=== Television ===
Best Edited Half-Hour Series for Television:

Gary Levy - Nurse Jackie for "Handle Your Scandal"

- Robert Frazen and Catherine Haight - Girls for "Pilot"
- Ryan Case - Modern Family for "Mystery Date"

Best Edited One-Hour Series – Commercial Television:

Skip Macdonald - Breaking Bad for "Dead Freight"

- Kelley Dixon - Breaking Bad for "Gliding Over All"
- Tom Wilson - Mad Men for "The Other Woman"
- Keith Henderson - Nashville for "Pilot"
- Andrew Weisblum - Smash for "Pilot"

Best Edited One-Hour Series – Non-Commercial Television:

Anne McCabe - The Newsroom for "We Just Decided To (Pilot)"

- Terry Kelley - Homeland for "The Choice"
- Jordan Goldman - Homeland for "State of Independence"

Best Edited Miniseries or Film – Commercial Television:

Lucia Zucchetti - Game Change

- Don Cassidy - Hatfields & McCoys Part 1
- Walter Murch - Hemingway & Gellhorn

Best Edited Non-Scripted Series:

Andy Netley and Sharon Gillooly - Frozen Planet for "Ends Of The Earth"

Student Competition:

Michael Smith – AFI
