= Grant Robinson (cricketer) =

New Zealand cricketer

Personal information
- Full name: Grant Geoffrey Robinson
- Born: 24 July 1979 (age 47); Gisborne, New Zealand
- Batting: Left-handed
- Role: Batsman

Domestic team information
- Years: Team
- 2001/02–2007/08: Northern Districts

Career statistics
Competition	First-class	List A
Matches	21	18
Runs scored	736	390
Batting average	21.64	27.85
100s/50s	1/2	0/2
Top score	125*	77*
Balls bowled	24	–
Wickets	0	–
Bowling average	–	–
5 wickets in innings	–	–
10 wickets in match	–	–
Best bowling	–	–
Catches/stumpings	10/–	8/–
- Source: Cricinfo, 8 June 2019

Grant Geoffrey Robinson (born 24 July 1979) is a New Zealand former cricketer who played first-class and List A cricket for Northern Districts from 2001 to 2008. He was born at Gisborne in 1979.

A left-handed batsman, Robinson's highest first-class score was 125 not out in Northern Districts' 16-run victory over Auckland in 2002–03. He was also a leading member of the Hamilton team that dominated the Hawke Cup competition in the 2000s. In 2005–06 he scored 268 against Northland to record the second-highest score in the history of the competition.

Robinson studied Law and Commerce at Waikato University. After working in senior positions for Westpac in Auckland, in 2019 he joined the compostable-packaging company Ecoware as general manager. As of 2026 he is the Franklin franchise owner for the house-building company G.J. Gardner Homes. He has a family with his wife Anna.
