= Tom Puna =

New Zealand cricketer

- Puna in 1962–63

Personal information
- Full name: Narotam Puna
- Born: 28 October 1929; Surat, British India
- Died: 7 June 1996 (aged 66); Hamilton, New Zealand
- Batting: Right-handed
- Bowling: Right-arm off-break
- Relatives: Ashok Puna (son); Kirti Puna (son)

International information
- National side: New Zealand
- Test debut (cap 111): 25 February 1966 v England
- Last Test: 11 March 1966 v England

Domestic team information
- Years: Team
- 1956/57–1968/69: Northern Districts

Career statistics
Competition	Test	First-class
Matches	3	70
Runs scored	31	1,305
Batting average	15.50	14.66
100s/50s	0/0	0/2
Top score	18*	62*
Balls bowled	480	15,053
Wickets	4	229
Bowling average	60.00	24.44
5 wickets in innings	0	11
10 wickets in match	0	0
Best bowling	2/40	6/25
Catches/stumpings	1/–	36/–
- Source: Cricinfo, 1 April 2017

Narotam "Tom" Puna (28 October 1929 – 7 June 1996) was a New Zealand cricketer who played in three Test matches in 1966.

== Life and career ==
Puna's family migrated from India to New Zealand when he was eight. He was a fixture in the Northern Districts side from 1956–57 to 1968–69, beginning as a middle-order batsman but descending the order as his off-spin bowling developed. His best innings figures were 6 for 25 against Otago in Hamilton in 1966–67 (match figures of 59–29–66–9). When he retired he was Northern Districts' leading wicket-taker, with 223. He also played Hawke Cup cricket for Waikato from 1949 to 1970.

Puna took 34 wickets at 13.70 in the Plunket Shield in the 1965–66 season, and was selected as New Zealand's principal spinner in all three Tests against the visiting England team later that season.

His sons Ashok and Kirti also played for Northern Districts.
