= Sydney Orchard =

New Zealand sportsman

- Born: 12 December 1875 Elmore, Victoria, Australia
- Died: 19 April 1947 (aged 71) Christchurch, New Zealand
- Weight: 81 kg (179 lb)
- Notable relative: Mark Orchard (great-grandson)

Rugby union career
- Position: Fullback
Provincial / State sides
Years	Team	Apps	(Points)
1893	Manawatu	4	
1894–99	Canterbury	20	
International career
Years	Team	Apps	(Points)
1896–97	New Zealand	0	(0)
- Cricket career

Cricket information
- Batting: Left-handed
- Bowling: Right-arm off-spin

Domestic team information
- Years: Team
- 1894–95 to 1912–13: Canterbury

Career statistics
Competition	First-class
Matches	31
Runs scored	1109
Batting average	19.80
100s/50s	0/6
Top score	83
Balls bowled	606
Wickets	14
Bowling average	25.21
5 wickets in innings
10 wickets in match
Best bowling	4/67
Catches/stumpings	26/0
- Source: Cricket Archive

Sydney Arthur Orchard (12 December 1875 – 19 April 1947) was a New Zealand rugby union player, referee and administrator, and cricket player and administrator.

== Early life and family ==
Orchard was born in Elmore, Victoria, Australia on 12 December 1875. He emigrated to New Zealand with his family in 1886.

== Rugby union ==
A wing and fullback, Orchard represented Manawatu and Canterbury at a provincial level. He was a member of the New Zealand national side in 1896 and 1897, playing eight matches, including two games against each of New South Wales and Queensland. After retiring as a player, Orchard served on the management committee of the Canterbury Rugby Union, and was also a referee.

== Cricket ==
Orchard played first-class cricket in New Zealand for Canterbury between 1895 and 1913. In 1909–10 Orchard took a hat-trick for Canterbury against Auckland in Auckland. After his playing career ended he managed the New Zealand team that toured Australia in 1913–14, and was sole selector for the two matches New Zealand played at home against Australia later that season.

His great-grandson Mark Orchard played cricket for the Northern Districts Knights.
