= Malcolm Harding =

Malcolm Harding may refer to:

- Malcolm Harding (archbishop of Rupert's Land) (1863–1949), Anglican metropolitan bishop in Canada
- Malcolm Harding (bishop of Brandon) (born 1936), Anglican bishop in Canada
- Malcolm Harding (cricketer) (born 1959), New Zealand cricketer
- Malcolm Harding (You), fictional character
