= Kevin Kennedy =

Kevin Kennedy may refer to:

- Kevin Kennedy (actor) (born 1961), English actor
- Kevin Kennedy (baseball) (born 1954), former manager in American Major League Baseball
- Kevin Kennedy (cricketer) (born 1945), New Zealand cricketer
- Kevin J. Kennedy (born 1956), former CEO of JDSU, current CEO of Avaya
- Kevin Kennedy (hurler), Irish hurler
- Kevin B. Kennedy, United States Air Force general
- Kevin Kennedy, screenwriter of The Assassination of Richard Nixon
