= Simon Andrews (cricketer) =

New Zealand cricketer (born 1980)

Simon Leslie Andrews (born 11 July 1980 in Auckland) is a New Zealand cricketer who bats right-handed and bowls right-arm fast-medium. He plays for the Northern Districts Knights in the State Championship and Hamilton in the Hawke Cup.

In the 2001/02 Hawke Cup tournament Andrews took 8/20 against Northland
