= Michael Pocock =

Michael Pocock may refer to:

- Michael Pocock (cricketer)
- Michael Pocock (businessman)
