= North Auckland =

North Auckland may refer to:

- The northern part of Auckland Region, New Zealand
- Northland Peninsula, earlier called the North Auckland Peninsula, New Zealand

== See also ==
- North Auckland Line, a section of New Zealand rail network
- North Auckland cricket team, former name of the Northland cricket team
