= Brian Dunning =

Brian Dunning may refer to:

- Brian Dunning (cricketer) (1940–2008), New Zealand cricketer
- Brian Dunning (author) (born 1965), author and podcast host
- Brian Dunning (flautist) (1952–2022), Irish jazz flute player
