= Presland =

Presland is a surname. Notable people with the surname include:

- Alicia Presland (born 1999), English cricketer
- Craig Presland (born 1960), New Zealand cricketer and business executive
- Eddie Presland (1943–2021), English footballer and cricketer
- Gary Presland, Australian archaeologist and writer
