= Jeremiah White (disambiguation) =

Jeremiah White may refer to:

- Jeremiah White (born 1982), American soccer player
- Jeremiah White (chaplain) (1629–1707), English Nonconformist minister, chaplain to Oliver Cromwell

== See also ==
- Jerry White (disambiguation)
- Jeremy White (disambiguation)
