= Don Clarke =

New Zealand rugby union player

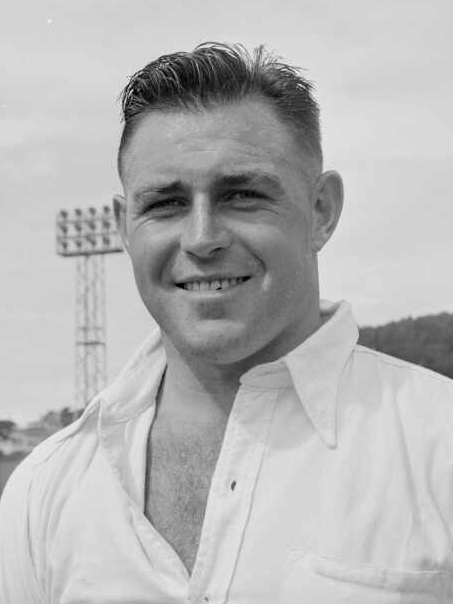
- Clarke in 1957
- Born: Donald Barry Clarke; 10 November 1933 Pihama, New Zealand
- Died: 29 December 2002 (aged 69) Johannesburg, South Africa
- Height: 1.88 m (6 ft 2 in)
- Weight: 110 kg (243 lb)
- Notable relative: Ian Clarke (brother)

Rugby union career
- Position: Fullback
Senior career
Years	Team	Apps	(Points)
- Waikato
International career
Years	Team	Apps	(Points)
1956–64	New Zealand	31	(207)

Donald Barry Clarke (10 November 1933 – 29 December 2002) was a New Zealand rugby union player who played 89 times (31 of these were test matches) as a New Zealand international from 1956 until 1964. He was best known for his phenomenal goal kicking ability that earned him the nickname "The Boot". He also played first-class cricket between 1950–51 and 1962–63. Later he lived in South Africa.

== Early life ==
Clarke was born at the small settlement of Pihama, near Ōpunake in the Taranaki Region. He was educated in the Waikato region at Ngarua School and Te Aroha College.

== Rugby career ==
Clarke was first selected to play rugby for Waikato at the age of 17 in 1951. In 1956 he helped the Waikato side to a 14–10 victory over the touring South African Springbok side. This helped his cause in being selected to play in the third All Black test match of the Springbok tour. Over his entire All Black career Clarke scored 781 points, a record that stood for 24 years until it was broken by Grant Fox in 1988.

Clarke had four brothers, Ian, Douglas, Brian and Graeme all of whom also represented Waikato. Only once did they all appear for Waikato in the same match, at Te Aroha in 1961.

A highlight of his career was to play for the Eastwood Rugby Club (Sydney, Australia) in an exhibition match. "One of the best days of my life" Clarke commented at the after match function. In July 1965 Clarke also helped Hornsby Rugby beat Mosman at Waitara Oval by scoring a try and demonstrating his kicking skills by kicking two penalties and three conversions.

== Cricket career ==
Clarke played 27 first-class cricket matches as a right-arm opening bowler, mostly for Auckland and Northern Districts, taking five or more wickets in an innings on four occasions. His best performance came for Northern Districts against Central Districts in January 1963, when he claimed 8/37 in the second innings. At the time, this was a record innings return for Northern Districts in first-class cricket, although it was beaten by Gren Alabaster's 8/30 just two months later.

Clarke played Hawke Cup cricket for Waikato from 1950 to 1958. He had some outstanding bowling figures, including two matches when Waikato won or retained the title: 8 for 41 against Wairarapa in March 1951, and 7 for 27 against Hawke's Bay in March 1958.

== Personal life ==
Clarke married in 1962 in Morrinsville. In 1977 he moved to South Africa, together with wife Patsy, son Glen and daughters Leigh and Shelley. There he set up a tree-felling business. In 1997, he was seriously injured in a motor vehicle accident, when a 15-tonne truck hit his utility vehicle. He was diagnosed with melanoma in March 2001, from which he died on 29 December 2002.
