= Stuart Veitch =

New Zealand cricketer (born 1940)

Personal information
- Born: 22 April 1940 (age 86); Gisborne, New Zealand
- Source: Cricinfo, 1 November 2020

Stuart Veitch (born 22 April 1940) is a New Zealand cricketer. He played in seven first-class matches for Northern Districts from 1960 to 1967.

== See also ==
- List of Northern Districts representative cricketers
