= Don Beard =

New Zealand cricketer (1920–1982)

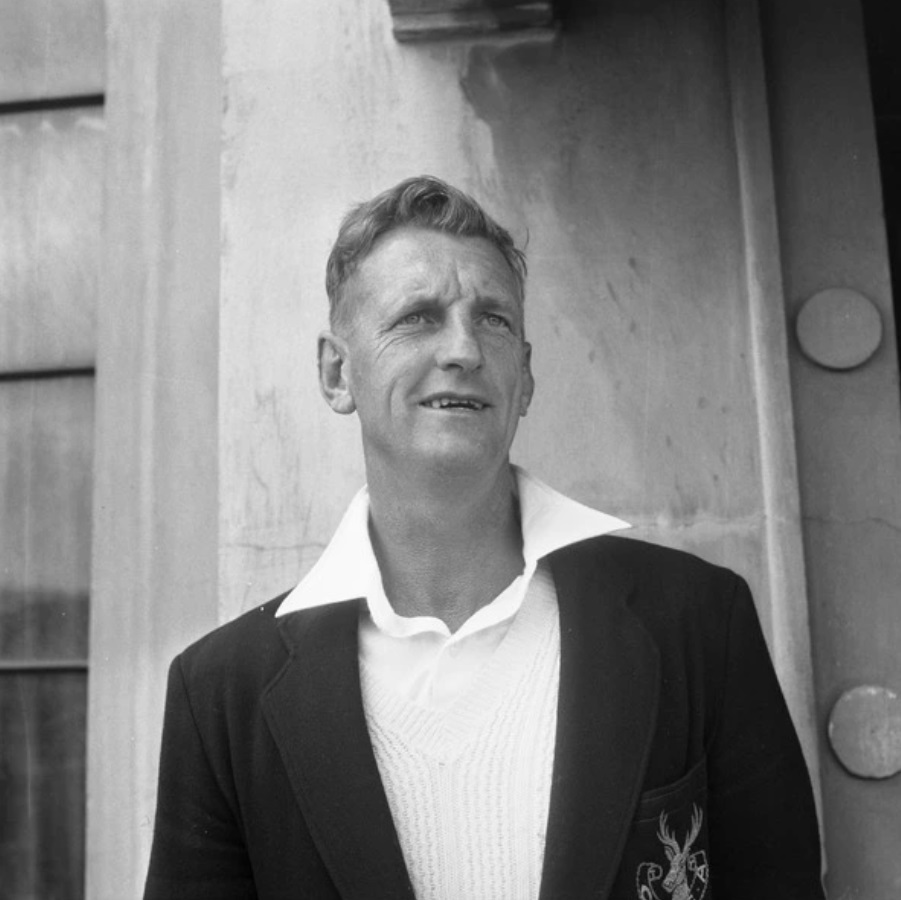
- Beard pictured in 1958

Personal information
- Full name: Donald Derek Beard
- Born: 14 January 1920; Palmerston North, Manawatu
- Died: 15 July 1982 (aged 62); Lancashire, England
- Batting: Right-handed
- Bowling: Right-arm medium
- Relatives: Derek Beard (son)

International information
- National side: New Zealand (1952–1956)
- Test debut (cap 54): 8 February 1952 v West Indies
- Last Test: 9 March 1956 v West Indies

Career statistics
Competition	Test	First-class
Matches	4	66
Runs scored	101	2166
Batting average	20.19	22.10
100s/50s	0/0	0/9
Top score	31	81*
Balls bowled	806	19,065
Wickets	9	278
Bowling average	33.55	21.58
5 wickets in innings	0	12
10 wickets in match	0	3
Best bowling	3/22	7/56
Catches/stumpings	2/–	50/–
- Source: Cricinfo, 1 April 2017

Donald Derek Beard (14 January 1920 – 15 July 1982) was a New Zealand cricketer who played in four Test matches from 1952 to 1956. He was a schoolteacher and school principal.

== Early life and career ==
Don Beard grew up in the country near Palmerston North, cycling 15 miles a day to attend Palmerston North Boys' High School. After teacher training in Auckland, he attended Victoria University in Wellington, from where he completed a Diploma in Education in 1946 and a Master of Arts in 1948. His thesis was on the history of physical education in New Zealand primary schools.

An accurate fast-medium bowler and useful lower-order batsman, Beard was selected to make his first-class debut for Wellington in the first round of Plunket Shield matches after the Second World War in December 1945, but he had not fully recovered from burns he had received while fighting a fire, and was replaced by Ray Buchan. He made his first-class debut a few weeks later in a friendly match against Auckland. He did not play Plunket Shield cricket until 1950–51, when he played for Central Districts in their inaugural match.

== International career ==
In the 1951–52 Plunket Shield season, Beard took 16 wickets at 27.25 and was selected for the two Tests against the touring West Indies side, taking four wickets.

He was a stalwart of the Central Districts team until 1960–61, taking 15 wickets and scoring 255 runs at 51.00 in 1953–54 when Central Districts won the Plunket Shield for the first time. He hit his top first-class score of 81 not out against Wellington during the season. Dick Brittenden said Beard specialised in the sweep shot, and "would have made more runs in his colourful career had he not expended so much of his patience on bowling".

Beard topped the bowling averages in the Plunket Shield in 1955–56 with 28 wickets at 10.64, "and 110 of his 217 overs were maidens". After the visiting West Indies side won the first two Tests by an innings, they played Central Districts at Wanganui, where Beard top-scored in each innings, making 25 and 67, and took 3 for 52 and 2 for 59 (match figures of 50.1–20–111–5). He returned to the Test team for the last two Tests, and played an important role in New Zealand's first-ever Test victory in the Fourth Test, making 31 and 6 not out and taking 1 for 20 and 3 for 22. But that was his last Test.

== Later career ==
Beard's best innings and match figures came in 1956–57 against Otago in Dunedin, when he took 7 for 56 and 4 for 43 (match figures of 61.4–26–99–11) in a match that Otago nevertheless won.

In 1961, Beard became principal of Te Aroha College in Waikato, and played a few games for Northern Districts. In 1961–62 he took 5 for 70 and 6 for 71 against Auckland, and 5 for 60 and 3 for 36 in the next match against Wellington. He played his last game in the 1964–65 season, just after turning 45.

Beard also played Hawke Cup cricket for Wanganui, Manawatu and Thames Valley between 1948 and 1966.

Beard stood nearly six feet three inches tall. He played basketball for New Zealand, was a notable amateur golfer, and played rugby union for Wellington, Wanganui (as captain) and North Island.

Beard died in 1982 while on holiday in England after retiring as principal of Te Aroha College. His son Derek also played first-class cricket in New Zealand.
