= Rex McGill =

New Zealand cricketer (born 1949)

Personal information
- Born: 17 March 1949 (age 77); Te Awamutu, New Zealand
- Source: Cricinfo, 1 November 2020

Rex McGill (born 17 March 1949) is a New Zealand cricketer. He played in five first-class matches for Northern Districts from 1969 to 1972.

== See also ==
- List of Northern Districts representative cricketers
