= Dion Bennett =

New Zealand cricketer (born 1974)

Personal information
- Born: 1 August 1974 (age 52); Thames, New Zealand
- Source: Cricinfo, 1 November 2020

Dion Bennett (born 1 August 1974) is a New Zealand cricketer. He played in three first-class matches for Northern Districts in 1996/97.

== See also ==
- List of Northern Districts representative cricketers
