= Peter Barton (cricketer) =

New Zealand cricketer

Personal information
- Full name: Peter Howard Barton
- Born: 28 March 1941 (age 85); Gisborne, New Zealand
- Batting: Left-handed
- Bowling: Right-arm medium
- Relatives: Hamish Barton (son); Hugh Barton (brother)

Domestic team information
- Years: Team
- 1962/63: Northern Districts
- 1964/65: Otago
- 1974/75: Northern Districts
- FC debut: 7 January 1963 Northern Districts v Otago
- Last FC: 3 January 1975 Northern Districts v Canterbury
- LA debut: 1 December 1974 Northern Districts v Central Districts
- Last LA: 15 December 1974 Northern Districts v Wellington
- Source: CricInfo, 3 January 2022

Peter Howard Barton (born 28 March 1941) is a New Zealand former cricketer. He played first-class cricket for Northern Districts and Otago.

Barton was born at Gisborne in 1941. He played Hawke Cup cricket for Poverty Bay in 1959/60, before making his first-class debut for Northern Districts in a Plunket Shield match against Otago in January 1963. He played three matches for Northern Districts before moving to Otago for the 1964/65 season, playing another three matches for the side. He played Hawke Cup cricket for Southland the following season before returning to play for Poverty Bay from 1968/69 until the start of the 1980s. He made two further first-class and two List A cricket appearance for Northern Districts in the 1974/75 season.

Barton's son, Hamish Barton, played first-class and List A cricket for Auckland and Canterbury between 1995/96 and 2000/01 and has also played for the Argentina national cricket team. His brother, Hugh played two first-class matches for Northern Districts in the 1957/58 season.
