= Bryan Higgins (cricketer) =

New Zealand cricketer

Personal information
- Full name: Bryan Breton Higgins
- Born: 29 June 1927; Suva, Fiji
- Died: 24 August 2003 (aged 76); Havelock North, Hastings, New Zealand
- Batting: Right-handed
- Bowling: Right-arm leg break

Domestic team information
- Years: Team
- 1952/53–1956/57: Waikato
- 1956/57: Northern Districts
- Source: Cricinfo, 1 November 2020

Bryan Breton Higgins (29 June 1927 – 24 August 2003) was a New Zealand cricketer. He played in one first-class match for Northern Districts during the 1956–57 season.

Higgins was born at Suva in Fiji in 1927. He played Hawke Cup cricket for Waikato between the 1952–53 and 1956–57 seasons and played matches for Northern Districts sides during the same period. His only first-class match was a January 1957 Plunket Shield fixture against Canterbury during Northern Districts first season in the competition. Primarily selected for his bowling, Higgins did not take a wicket in the match and scored 14 runs in his second innings after recording a duck in his first.

Professionally Higgins was the director of a company. He was a selector for Northern Districts sides in later life. He died at Havelock North near Hastings in 2003 at the age of 76. An obituary was published in the 2004 edition of the New Zealand Cricket Almanack.
