= Shane Gadsdon =

New Zealand cricketer (born 1991)

Personal information
- Born: 18 April 1991 (age 35); Auckland, New Zealand
- Source: Cricinfo, 1 November 2020

Shane Gadsdon (born 8 April 1991) is a New Zealand cricketer. He played in two first-class matches for Northern Districts in 2009.

== See also ==
- List of Northern Districts representative cricketers
