= Grant McKenzie =

New Zealand cricketer (born 1961)

Personal information
- Born: 11 May 1961 (age 65); Napier, New Zealand
- Source: Cricinfo, 1 November 2020

Grant McKenzie (born 11 May 1961) is a New Zealand cricketer. He played in 34 first-class and 11 List A matches for Northern Districts from 1983 to 1991.

== See also ==
- List of Northern Districts representative cricketers
