= Gerald Stewart =

New Zealand cricketer

Personal information
- Born: 10 February 1936 (age 90); Dunedin, New Zealand
- Source: Cricinfo, 1 November 2020

Gerald Stewart (born 10 February 1936) is a New Zealand cricketer. He played in one first-class match for Northern Districts in 1968/69.

== See also ==
- List of Northern Districts representative cricketers
