= Jeremy White =

Jeremy White may refer to:

- Jeremy White (bass), English bass
- Jeremy White (cricketer) (born 1947), New Zealand cricketer
- Jeremy Allen White (born 1991), American film and television actor
- Jeremy Joyner White (1938–1990), professor at the University of Lagos

== See also ==
- Jerry White (disambiguation)
