= Peter Anderson (New Zealand cricketer) =

New Zealand cricketer

Personal information
- Full name: Peter Stewart Anderson
- Born: 3 February 1950; Taihape, New Zealand
- Died: 27 December 2012 (aged 62); Tauranga, New Zealand
- Batting: Left-handed
- Bowling: Right-arm medium-pace
- Role: Opening bowler

Domestic team information
- Years: Team
- 1977/78–1978/79: Northern Districts

Career statistics
Competition	First-class	List A
Matches	7	3
Runs scored	20	9
Batting average	10.00	–
100s/50s	0/0	0/0
Top score	10*	9*
Balls bowled	1506	172
Wickets	20	2
Bowling average	33.75	27.50
5 wickets in innings	2	0
10 wickets in match	1	0
Best bowling	5/38	2/19
Catches/stumpings	1/–	0/–
- Source: ESPNcricinfo, 19 January 2021

Peter Anderson (3 February 1950 – 27 December 2012) was a New Zealand cricketer. He played seven first-class matches for Northern Districts between 1977 and 1979.

A right-arm medium-pace bowler, Anderson had one outstanding match, when he opened the bowling against Canterbury at Tauranga Domain in the Shell Cup in January 1979 and took 5 for 74 and 5 for 38 in Northern Districts' 56-run victory. He also played Hawke Cup cricket for Bay of Plenty from 1976 to 1982.

== See also ==
- List of Northern Districts representative cricketers
