= Gary Murphy (cricketer) =

New Zealand table tennis player and cricketer (born 1948)

Personal information
- Born: 26 May 1948 (age 78); Lower Hutt, New Zealand
- Source: Cricinfo, 1 November 2020

Gary Murphy (born 26 May 1948) is a New Zealand table tennis player and cricketer. He won the New Zealand men's table tennis championship in 1970. He played in one List A match for Northern Districts in 1973/74.

Gary is the son of New Zealand boxer Bos Murphy.

== See also ==
- List of Northern Districts representative cricketers
