= Aaron Bradley =

New Zealand cricketer (born 1974)

Personal information
- Full name: Aaron John Bradley
- Born: 3 November 1974 (age 52); Whangārei, New Zealand
- Batting: Right-handed
- Bowling: Right-arm off break

Domestic team information
- Years: Team
- 1992/93–2003/04: Northland
- 1993/94–1994/95: Northern Districts
- Source: Cricinfo, 30 September 2024

Aaron John Bradley (born 3 November 1974) is a New Zealand former cricketer. He played in six first-class and 11 List A matches for Northern Districts between the 1993–94 season and 1994–95.

Bradley was born at Whangārei in Northland in 1974 and educated at Whangārei Boys' High School. He made his Hawke Cup debut for Northland in 1992–93 before making his senior debut for Northern Districts the following season. A top-order batsman, after a short top-level career Bradley continued to play for Northland until moving to Auckland for work reasons ahead of the 2004–05 season.
