= Norman Harwood =

New Zealand cricketer

Personal information
- Born: 29 December 1929; Palmerston North, New Zealand
- Died: 10 August 2008 (aged 78)
- Source: Cricinfo, 1 November 2020

Norman Harwood (29 December 1929 – 10 August 2008) was a New Zealand cricketer. He played in one first-class match for Northern Districts in 1959/60.

== See also ==
- List of Northern Districts representative cricketers
