= John McLeod (New Zealand cricketer) =

New Zealand cricketer (born 1947)

Personal information
- Born: 30 September 1947 (age 79); Whanganui, New Zealand
- Source: Cricinfo, 1 November 2020

John McLeod (born 30 September 1947) is a New Zealand cricketer. He played in four first-class matches for Northern Districts from 1970 to 1972.

== See also ==
- List of Northern Districts representative cricketers
