= Hira Unka =

New Zealand cricketer

Personal information
- Born: 1 June 1943; Mysore, India
- Died: 10 August 2012 (aged 69); Rotorua, New Zealand
- Batting: Right-handed
- Bowling: Right-arm medium-fast

Domestic team information
- Years: Team
- 1968/69–1975/76: Northern Districts

Career statistics
| Competition | First-class | List A |
|---|---|---|
| Matches | 25 | 5 |
| Runs scored | 90 | 3 |
| Batting average | 6.42 | 3.00 |
| 100s/50s | 0/0 | 0/0 |
| Top score | 16* | 3 |
| Balls bowled | 4,066 | 242 |
| Wickets | 46 | 7 |
| Bowling average | 38.97 | 21.42 |
| 5 wickets in innings | 3 | 0 |
| 10 wickets in match | 0 | – |
| Best bowling | 6/67 | 3/39 |
| Catches/stumpings | 5/– | 3/– |
- Source: ESPNcricinfo, 26 January 2023

Hira Unka (1 June 1943 – 10 August 2012) was a New Zealand cricketer. He played in 25 first-class and five List A matches for Northern Districts between 1968 and 1976.

A right-arm opening bowler, Unka took his best first-class figures in the opening match of the 1973–74 Plunket Shield: 6 for 67 against Otago. He also played Hawke Cup cricket for Bay of Plenty from 1970 to 1981.

== See also ==
- List of Northern Districts representative cricketers
