= Len Wyatt =

New Zealand cricketer

Personal information
- Full name: John Leonard Wyatt
- Born: 17 March 1919; Leigh, New Zealand
- Died: 29 January 2015 (aged 95); Warkworth, New Zealand
- Batting: Right-handed
- Relatives: Ivan Wyatt (brother)

Domestic team information
- Years: Team
- 1956/57: Northern Districts

Career statistics
Competition	First-class
Matches	4
Runs scored	163
Batting average	23.28
100s/50s	0/1
Top score	54
Catches/stumpings	0/0
- Source: Cricinfo, 25 April 2017

John Leonard Wyatt (7 March 1919 – 29 January 2015) was a New Zealand cricketer who played for Northern Districts in the Plunket Shield in the 1956–57 season. He was the older brother of Ivan Wyatt.

In World War II Len Wyatt served in New Caledonia and the Solomon Islands with the 1st Battalion, New Zealand Scottish Regiment and the 36th Battalion. He rose to the rank of lieutenant in 1942 and was posted to the Reserve of Officers in 1945.

Wyatt played club and representative cricket until he was 59, scoring more than 40,000 runs with 128 centuries. He captained the Northland cricket team for several years, and when he was 37 he played in Northern Districts' inaugural season in the Plunket Shield in 1956–57. In the fourth match, against Wellington, he opened the batting and scored 54 and 29, putting on first-wicket partnerships of 109 and 55 with James Everest.

Wyatt worked in the family farming and sawmilling businesses all his life until he retired in 1986. He married Joyce Smith in Auckland in September 1943; they had two sons and a daughter.
