= Ian Clarke (rugby union) =

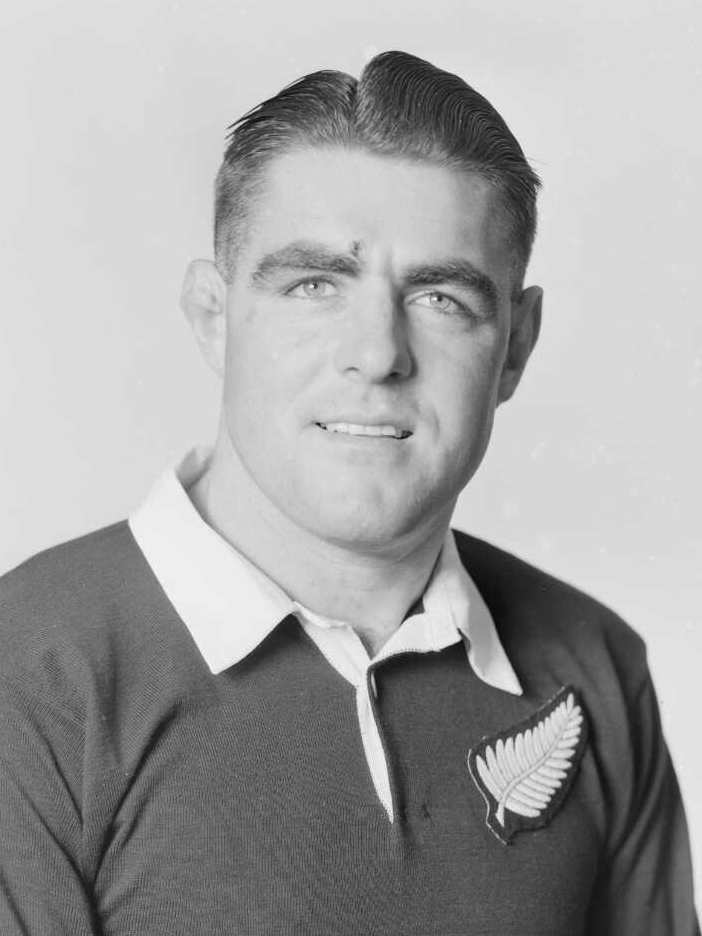
- Clarke in 1953
- Born: 5 March 1931 Kaponga, New Zealand
- Died: 29 June 1997 (aged 66)
- Height: 5 ft 10.5 in (179 cm)
- Weight: 14 st 3 lb (199 lb; 90 kg) to 15 st 5 lb (215 lb; 98 kg)
- Notable relative: Don Clarke (brother)

Rugby union career
Senior career
Years	Team	Apps	(Points)
1947-?	Kereone Rugby Club		
?-1964	Waikato		
International career
Years	Team	Apps	(Points)
1953, 1955	New Zealand		

Ian James Clarke (5 March 1931 – 29 June 1997) was a New Zealand rugby union player, farmer and rugby administrator.

Clarke was the eldest of five sons of Alexander James Clarke, a blacksmith, and Annie Marie Taylor. He joined the Kereone Rugby Club in 1947, and in 1953 was selected for the All Black team that toured Britain and France. He captained the team in three tests against Australia in 1955. In 1961 all five Clarke brothers played for Waikato in a game against Thames Valley.

On 16 February 1963, Clarke married Jeanette Eleanor Welch, a copywriter; they had no children. He retired as a player in 1964 after completing 252 first-class games, including 24 tests. He then became a dairy farmer and a rugby referee and administrator. He served as vice president of the New Zealand Rugby Football Union, becoming its president in 1993. On 29 June 1997, Clarke collapsed and died while feeding out stock. His wife, Jeanette Clarke, died in 2026.
