= John MacFarlane =

John MacFarlane or John Macfarlane may refer to:

== Politicians ==
- John MacFarlane (Ipswich) (1829–1894), Member of the Queensland Legislative Assembly for Ipswich
- John MacFarlane (New South Wales politician) (1813–1873), Scottish-born Australian physician and Member of the New South Wales Legislative Council
- John MacFarlane (Queensland politician) (1823–1880), Member of the Queensland Legislative Assembly for Rockhampton
- John Duncan MacFarlane (1892–1982), farmer and politician in Saskatchewan, Canada
- John Sangster Macfarlane (1818–1880), 19th-century Member of Parliament in Auckland, New Zealand

== Others ==
- John Edward Macfarlane (born 1942), Canadian journalist
- John Macfarlane, Scottish artist and theatre designer, Prix Benois de la Danse winner (2015)
- John Lisle Hall MacFarlane (1851–1874), Scottish rugby player
- John Menzies Macfarlane (1833–1892), Scottish Latter-day Saint hymnwriter
- John Muirhead Macfarlane (1855–1943), Scottish botanist
- John MacFarlane (entrepreneur), American businessman, co-founder of Sonos
- John MacFarlane (philosopher), logician and original author of Pandoc

== See also ==
- John McFarlane (disambiguation)
