= Norm Wilson (cricketer) =

New Zealand cricketer (1931–2018)

Personal information
- Full name: Norman Rowley Wilson
- Born: 14 January 1931; Auckland, New Zealand
- Died: 28 March 2018 (aged 87)
- Batting: Left-handed
- Bowling: Right-arm leg-spin

Domestic team information
- Years: Team
- 1957/58–1960/61: Northern Districts

Career statistics
Competition	First-class
Matches	5
Runs scored	81
Batting average	9.00
100s/50s	0/0
Top score	21
Balls bowled	302
Wickets	3
Bowling average	61.33
5 wickets in innings	0
10 wickets in match	0
Best bowling	2/49
Catches/stumpings	1/–
- Source: Cricinfo, 5 June 2018

Norman Rowley Wilson (14 January 1931 – 28 March 2018) was a New Zealand cricketer.

An all-rounder, Norm Wilson played five matches of first-class cricket for Northern Districts between 1958 and 1961, and Hawke Cup cricket for Northland between 1952 and 1970.

He captained Northland for seven years. He was a key person in the consolidation of the Northland Cricket Association, and served as committeeman, secretary, chairman, and finally, since 2002, the patron. He was the groundsman at Cobham Oval in Whangārei from the 1970s to the 2000s.
