= Dhiru Patel =

Indian cricketer (born 1943)

Personal information
- Full name: Dhiraj Ukabhai Patel
- Born: 29 April 1943 (age 83); Navsari, India
- Source: ESPNcricinfo, 1 November 2020

Dhiru Patel (born 29 April 1943) is an Indian cricketer. He played first-class cricket for Gujarat from 1966 to 1970, before playing for Northern Districts in New Zealand for the 1971/72 season.

== See also ==
- List of Northern Districts representative cricketers
