= Peter Stone (cricketer) =

New Zealand cricketer (born 1938)

Personal information
- Born: 5 May 1938 (age 88); Kaitaia, New Zealand
- Source: Cricinfo, 1 November 2020

Peter Stone (born 5 May 1938) is a New Zealand cricketer. He played in twenty-three first-class matches for Northern Districts from 1961 to 1969.

== See also ==
- List of Northern Districts representative cricketers
