= Jerry White =

Jerry White may refer to:

- Jerry White (activist) (born 1963), co-founder of the Landmine Survivors Network
- Jerry White (criminal) (1948–1995), criminal executed in Florida
- Jerry White (baseball) (born 1952), player and coach in Major League Baseball
- Jerry White (Navigators) (born 1937), President Emeritus and Chairman of the U.S. Board of Directors of The Navigators
- Jerry White (socialist) (born 1959), presidential candidate for the Socialist Equality Party and reporter for the World Socialist Web Site
- Jerry White (historian), British historian specialising in the history of London
- Son of Perry White, in the fictional Superman universe

== See also ==
- Gerry White (1943–2008), businessman
- Jeremy White (disambiguation)
- Jeremiah White (disambiguation)
- Jerome White (disambiguation)
- Gerald White (born 1964), American football player
