= Jim Smith (cricketer, born 1940) =

New Zealand cricketer

Personal information
- Full name: James Douglas Smith
- Born: 26 June 1940 (age 86); Epsom, Auckland, New Zealand
- Batting: Right-handed
- Bowling: Right-arm fast

Domestic team information
- Years: Team
- 1967/68–1971/72: Northern Districts

Career statistics
Competition	First-class	List A
Matches	15	1
Runs scored	211	2
Batting average	12.41	–
100s/50s	0/0	0/0
Top score	27*	2*
Balls bowled	2,928	64
Wickets	33	0
Bowling average	38.36	–
5 wickets in innings	1	–
10 wickets in match	0	–
Best bowling	5/80	–
Catches/stumpings	6/–	0/–
- Source: Cricinfo, 4 December 2017

James Douglas Smith (born 26 June 1940) is a former New Zealand cricketer who played first-class cricket for Northern Districts from 1967 to 1972.

A right-arm fast bowler, Jim Smith had a successful first season in Plunket Shield cricket in 1967–68, taking 15 wickets in five matches at an average of 29.20, including his career-best figures of 5 for 80 against Auckland. However, he was less successful in ten more first-class matches over the next four seasons.

Smith also played Hawke Cup cricket for Waikato from 1969 to 1974. He took 32 wickets at an average of 6.37 in four matches in 1969-70 when Waikato resisted three challenges before losing to Southland. In the victory over Horowhenua he took 5 for 13 and 8 for 25.
