= David Tidmarsh (cricketer) =

New Zealand cricketer (born 1971)

Personal information
- Born: 2 May 1971 (age 55); Hay, New South Wales, Australia
- Source: Cricinfo, 1 November 2020

David Tidmarsh (born 2 May 1971) is a New Zealand former cricketer. He played in three first-class matches for Northern Districts in 1992/93. After his cricket career, he became an umpire.

== See also ==
- List of Northern Districts representative cricketers
