= Peter Skelton =

New Zealand cricketer

Personal information
- Full name: Peter Jeffrey Skelton
- Born: 25 July 1934; Whanganui, New Zealand
- Died: 1 August 2009 (aged 75); Christchurch, New Zealand
- Batting: Right-handed

Domestic team information
- Years: Team
- 1953/54: Otago
- 1957/58: Waikato
- 1957/58: Northern Districts
- Source: CricInfo, 24 May 2016

Peter Jeffrey Skelton (25 July 1934 – 1 August 2009) was a New Zealand cricketer. He played two matches of first-class cricket during the 1950s, one each for Otago and Northern Districts.

Skelton was born at Whanganui in 1934 and educated at King's High School in Dunedin where he played cricket. In 1950 he scored 37 runs against the New Zealand national cricket team in a practice match for a Dunedin schools side. The Otago Daily Times reported that he "defended his wicket with confidence" before retiring and Skelton played age-group cricket for Otago during the early 1950s and for Otago XIs before making his first-class debut for the side against the touring Fijians in February 1954. Opening the batting, he scored 13 in his first innings before making 53 in his second, the only half-century he scored in first-class cricket.

After moving to the North Island, Skelton played Hawke Cup cricket for Waikato during the 1957–58 season before playing his only Plunket Shield match later in the season for Northern Districts. Replacing Doug Carswell who had been injured after being hit on the head on his debut in the side's previous match, Skelton made scores of six and 11 against Auckland. He died at Christchurch in 2009.
