= Nicholas Lloyd (cricketer) =

New Zealand cricketer (born 1963)

Personal information
- Born: 29 September 1963 (age 63); Maidstone, England
- Source: Cricinfo, 1 November 2020

Nicholas Lloyd (born 29 September 1963) is a New Zealand cricketer. He played in one List A and four first-class matches for Northern Districts in 1990/91.

== See also ==
- List of Northern Districts representative cricketers
