= Sean Lambly =

New Zealand cricketer (born 1970)

Personal information
- Born: 7 October 1970 (age 56); Auckland, New Zealand
- Source: Cricinfo, 1 November 2020

Sean Lambly (born 7 October 1970) is a New Zealand cricketer. He played in four first-class and nine List A matches for Northern Districts from 1993 to 1995.

== See also ==
- List of Northern Districts representative cricketers
