= Precision questioning =

Asking clear, targeted questions to get specific, accurate answers

Precision questioning (PQ), an intellectual toolkit for critical thinking and for problem solving, grew out of a collaboration between Dennis Matthies (1946- ) and Dr. Monica Worline, while both taught/studied at Stanford University.

Precision questioning seeks to enable its practitioners with a highly structured, one-question/one-answer discussion format to help them:

- solve complex problems
- conduct deep analysis
- make difficult decisions

PQ focuses on clearly expressing gaps in thinking by coupling a taxonomy of analytical questions with a structured call-and-response model to enable PQ practitioners to uncover weaknesses in thinking and to raise the intellectual level of a conversation.

Those who use precision questioning (also called "PQers") describe PQ conversations as those analytical opportunities motivated by an attempt to get to precise answers, or to identify where no answer is available.

However, when "drilling" into a topic, practitioners endeavor to avoid the use of personalization (blame or shame). Precision questioning holds to the ideal of meeting one's own needs for information while also respecting the intellectual integrity of the conversation-partner.

Matthies, who taught at Stanford University's Center for Teaching and Learning (CTL) in the 1990s, developed several experimental courses that have subsequently become known to a wider public — including Precision Questioning, initially taught in the Stanford Philosophy Department.

Proselytizing for precision questioning on a commercial basis continues via the Vervago company, co-founded by Matthies and Worline.

Tens of thousands of people in universities and companies throughout the world have studied different versions of precision questioning.

== See also ==
- Critical Thinking
- Problem-solving
- Nonviolent Communication
