= Dennis Lloyd (cricketer) =

New Zealand cricketer

Personal information
- Full name: Dennis Patrick Lloyd
- Born: 1 December 1948 (age 77); Auckland, New Zealand
- Batting: Right-handed
- Bowling: Right-arm off-spin

Domestic team information
- Years: Team
- 1968/69–1980/81: Northern Districts

Career statistics
Competition	First-class	List A
Matches	34	6
Runs scored	1,211	62
Batting average	20.52	12.40
100s/50s	1/3	0/0
Top score	103	34*
Balls bowled	992	–
Wickets	6	–
Bowling average	90.83	–
5 wickets in innings	0	–
10 wickets in match	0	–
Best bowling	2/76	–
Catches/stumpings	14/–	2/–
- Source: Cricinfo, 2 February 2020

Dennis Patrick Lloyd (born 1 December 1948) is a former New Zealand cricketer who played first-class and List A cricket for Northern Districts from 1968 to 1981.

Lloyd was a batsman who often opened the innings. His highest first-class score was 103 against Canterbury in 1968–69. In a semi-final of the List A competition in 1977–78 he opened the batting for Northern Districts and made 34 not out as he and Barry Roberts successfully chased Auckland's total of 70 without losing a wicket.

Lloyd also played Hawke Cup cricket for Northland from 1967 to 1985. He opened the batting in the team that won the title in 1982–83, top-scoring with 88 in the victory over Nelson. In all he played more than 100 matches for Northland.
