= Terence Masters =

New Zealand cricketer (born 1945)

Personal information
- Born: 28 March 1945 (age 81); Whanganui, New Zealand
- Source: Cricinfo, 1 November 2020

Terence Masters (born 28 March 1945) is a New Zealand cricketer. He played in three first-class matches for Northern Districts in 1969/70.

== See also ==
- List of Northern Districts representative cricketers
