= Karl Treiber =

New Zealand cricketer (born 1955)

Personal information
- Born: 4 December 1955 (age 70); Lendava, Yugoslavia
- Batting: Left-handed
- Bowling: Slow left-arm orthodox Left-arm fast-medium
- Role: Bowler

Domestic team information
- Years: Team
- 1979/80–1987/88: Northern Districts

Career statistics
Competition	FC	List A
Matches	27	15
Runs scored	174	15
Batting average	10.23	7.50
100s/50s	0/0	0/0
Top score	31	9
Balls bowled	4,758	838
Wickets	73	24
Bowling average	29.60	23.50
5 wickets in innings	3	0
10 wickets in match	0	–
Best bowling	7/42	4/28
Catches/stumpings	8/–	4/–
- Source: Cricinfo, 7 May 2025

Karl Treiber (born 4 December 1955) is a former New Zealand cricketer. He played in 27 first-class and 15 List A matches for Northern Districts from 1979 to 1988.

Treiber was born in Slovenia in 1955 when it was part of Yugoslavia, and migrated with his parents to New Zealand when he was a boy. He was a left-arm bowler who could bowl orthodox spin or fast-medium. His best first-class bowling figures were 7 for 42 and 2 for 38 when Northern Districts defeated Otago in the 1985–86 Shell Trophy.

Treiber also played cricket for Northland, and was a part of the team that won the Hawke Cup in the 1980s and 1990s. Later he became a prominent coach in the Northland Region.
