= Rory Christopherson =

New Zealand cricketer (born 1988)

Personal information
- Born: 14 September 1988 (age 38); Whanganui, New Zealand
- Source: Cricinfo, 1 November 2020

Rory Christopherson (born 14 September 1988) is a New Zealand cricketer. He played in two first-class and three List A matches for Northern Districts in 2014.

Christopherson has a master's degree from Auckland University of Technology.

== See also ==
- List of Northern Districts representative cricketers
