= Steve Scott (cricketer) =

New Zealand cricketer (born 1955)

Personal information
- Born: 2 April 1955 (age 71); Matamata, New Zealand
- Source: Cricinfo, 1 November 2020

Steve Scott (born 2 April 1955) is a New Zealand cricketer. He played in 35 first-class and 15 List A matches for Northern Districts from 1978 to 1986.

== See also ==
- List of Northern Districts representative cricketers
