= Neil Pollock =

New Zealand cricketer (born 1955)

Personal information
- Born: 25 August 1955 (age 71); Pukekohe, New Zealand
- Source: Cricinfo, 1 November 2020

Neil Pollock (born 25 August 1955) is a New Zealand cricketer. He played in seven first-class and three List A matches for Northern Districts from 1981 to 1987.

== See also ==
- List of Northern Districts representative cricketers
