= Terence Beatson =

New Zealand cricketer (born 1947)

Personal information
- Born: 3 October 1947 (age 79); Motueka, New Zealand
- Source: Cricinfo, 1 November 2020

Terence Beatson (born 3 October 1947) is a New Zealand cricketer. He played in three first-class matches for Northern Districts from 1970 to 1972.

== See also ==
- List of Northern Districts representative cricketers
