= John Beuth =

New Zealand cricketer (born 1945)

Personal information
- Born: 27 June 1945 (age 81); Gisborne, New Zealand
- Source: Cricinfo, 1 November 2020

John Beuth (born 27 June 1945) is a New Zealand cricketer. He played in twelve first-class matches for Northern Districts from 1962 to 1970.

== See also ==
- List of Northern Districts representative cricketers
