= Nathan Daley =

New Zealander cricketer (born 1977)

Nathan Daley (born 2 June 1977) is a New Zealand cricketer who played for Northern Districts. Daley made his only List A appearance for Northern Districts against Central Districts in January 2000. Between December 2002 and December 2003, Daley played four First-class matches for Northern Districts. Daley was captain of the Hamilton team that won the Hawke Cup in 2005 and defended the cup five times before losing to Taranaki in 2007.
