= Rene Ferdinands =

New Zealand cricketer (born 1969)

Personal information
- Born: 3 May 1969 (age 57); Colombo, Ceylon
- Source: Cricinfo, 1 November 2020

Rene Ferdinands (born 3 May 1969) is a former New Zealand cricketer. He played in one first-class match for Northern Districts in 1998/99.

Ferdinands completed a MSc and PhD at the University of Waikato. His doctoral thesis was on the biomechanics of fast bowling. As of September 2023, he works at the University of Sydney, where he researches sports biomechanics.

== See also ==
- List of Northern Districts representative cricketers
