= James Wright (New Zealand cricketer) =

New Zealand cricketer

Personal information
- Full name: James Linton Wright
- Born: 2 June 1936; Queensland, Australia
- Died: 13 November 2021 (aged 85); Ahipara, Northland, New Zealand
- Batting: Right-handed
- Bowling: Left arm medium-fast

Domestic team information
- Years: Team
- 1958/59: Northern Districts
- Source: Cricinfo, 1 November 2020

James Linton Wright (2 June 1936 – 13 November 2021) was a New Zealand cricketer. He played in three first-class matches for Northern Districts in 1958/59.

Wright died on 13 November 2021, at the age of 85.

== See also ==
- List of Northern Districts representative cricketers
