= Russell Mawhinney =

New Zealand cricketer (born 1960)

Personal information
- Full name: Russell Eric Wilson Mawhinney
- Born: 28 March 1960 (age 66); Ranfurly, Central Otago, New Zealand
- Batting: Left-handed
- Bowling: Left-arm medium

Domestic team information
- Years: Team
- 1983/84: Otago
- 1985/86–1986/87: Northern Districts
- 1987/88: Hamilton
- 1988/89: Griqualand West
- 1989/90–1991/92: Otago
- Source: ESPNcricinfo, 16 May 2016

Russell Eric Wilson Mawhinney (born 28 March 1960) is a New Zealand lawyer and former cricketer. He played first-class cricket for Otago, Griqualand West and Northern Districts between the 1983–84 and 1990–91 seasons.

Mawhinney was born at Ranfurly in Central Otago in 1960 into a farming family. He was educated at Ranfurly High School and Waitaki Boys' High School before taking a geography degree at the University of Otago, graduating in 1984. He played age-group cricket and rugby union for Otago and played Second XI cricket for Otago from the 1982–83 season before making his representative debut for the provincial side the following season, playing in Otago's final two Plunket Shield matches of the season, scoring 41 runs on debut and taking two wickets in his second match.

After graduating Mawhinney played cricket in England for a year before training as a lawyer in Auckland, qualifying in 1986 at Hamilton. He played 11 first-class and five List A matches for Northern Districts during the 1985–86 and 1986–97 seasons and played cricket in Scotland for Stirling County for two seasons. During 1988–89 he played in South Africa for Griqualand West during the sporting boycott of South Africa, later arguing that he "wanted to see [the country] through my own eyes". He returned to play for Otago for three season from 1989–90 to 1990–91, making a further 16 first-class and five List A appearances for the side.

Mawhinney went on to practice law at Dunedin before buying a practice at Queenstown in Otago in 2002. He served on the Queenstown Lakes District Council for three years and was a member of the New Zealand Law Society executive committee for property law. He is married with three sons.
