= Harry Morgan (cricketer) =

New Zealand cricketer

Personal information
- Full name: Henry Alan Morgan
- Born: 5 June 1938; Wellington, New Zealand
- Died: 6 July 2024 (aged 86); Rotorua, New Zealand
- Batting: Left-handed
- Bowling: Right-arm medium-pace
- Relatives: Richard Morgan (son)

Domestic team information
- Years: Team
- 1963–64 to 1977–78: Wellington

Career statistics
Competition	FC	List A
Matches	33	11
Runs scored	789	252
Batting average	19.24	25.20
100s/50s	0/4	0/2
Top score	67	66
Balls bowled	5684	522
Wickets	73	15
Bowling average	26.21	25.20
5 wickets in innings	1	0
10 wickets in match	0	–
Best bowling	5/42	3/48
Catches/stumpings	20/–	6/–
- Source: Cricinfo, 17 May 2018

Henry Alan Morgan (5 June 1938 – 6 July 2024) was a New Zealand cricketer who played first-class cricket for Wellington from 1963 to 1978.

Harry Morgan was a medium-pace bowler and useful lower-order batsman who was an irregular member of the Wellington team for 15 years. His best first-class bowling figures were 5 for 42 against Canterbury in 1966–67. His highest score was 67, also against Canterbury, in his second-last match in 1977–78.

Morgan won the Man of the Match award in the final of the New Zealand Motor Corporation Knock-Out in 1973–74. He took 3 for 55 in Auckland's innings then top-scored with 46 as Wellington reached their target with one wicket and six balls to spare.

Morgan died in Rotorua in July 2024, aged 86. His son Richard played first-class cricket in New Zealand from 1993 to 2002.
