= Ray Buchan =

New Zealand cricketer (1908–1986)

Personal information
- Full name: William Rae Buchan
- Born: 19 October 1908; Thames, Waikato, New Zealand
- Died: September 1986 (aged 77); Wellington, New Zealand
- Bowling: Right-arm medium

Domestic team information
- Years: Team
- 1943/44–1945/46: Wellington

Career statistics
Competition	First-class
Matches	6
Runs scored	136
Batting average	15.11
100s/50s	0/0
Top score	37
Balls bowled	1,533
Wickets	22
Bowling average	24.22
5 wickets in innings	1
10 wickets in match	0
Best bowling	7/66
Catches/stumpings	2/–
- Source: Cricinfo, 4 September 2018

William Rae Buchan (19 October 1908 – September 1986), known as Ray Buchan, was a New Zealand cricketer who played first-class cricket for Wellington from 1943 to 1946.

== Personal life ==
Ray Buchan was born in Thames, in the Waikato region of New Zealand's North Island, and studied at the Thames School of Mines. He married Florence Dixon (1907–1983) of Wellington in 1940. They had one child. Ray died in 1986. Florence is buried in Akatarawa Cemetery, Upper Hutt.

== Cricket career ==
=== Early days ===
A right-arm medium-pace bowler and lower-order batsman, Buchan played for Karaka in the Thames cricket competition and played for the Thames Cricket Association in representative matches. After some time in Auckland, in early 1937 he moved to Wellington, where he played for the Institute club in the Wellington Cricket Association. In the first match of the 1937–38 season he took 8 for 47. He was elected captain of Institute in 1938–39.

He transferred to Hutt, another club in the Wellington Cricket Association, before the 1939–40 season, and took 7 for 21 in his first match, bowling with "good length and plenty of life". He was selected for Town in the Town v Country trial match in December 1939, but the match was spoilt by rain. In 1942-43 Hutt went through the season undefeated and won the championship, Buchan taking 60 wickets at an average of 6.48 to head the competition averages. Hutt won the championship again in 1943–44, Buchan taking 48 wickets at 9.62, including a hat trick in the last match.

=== First-class cricket ===
Buchan made his first-class debut in 1943–44 at the age of 35, taking four wickets in two matches for Wellington. He missed most of the 1944–45 season after an operation for appendicitis.

When the Plunket Shield resumed in the 1945–46 season after its wartime suspension, Buchan was 37 years old. He was not initially selected in Wellington's team, but in a one-day practice match on 22 December, playing for The Rest against the Wellington team at Basin Reserve, he took 6 for 45 off 27 overs and was largely responsible for the defeat of the Shield team. He replaced Don Beard, who had not fully recovered from burns he had received while fighting a fire, in Wellington's team for the Plunket Shield match against Otago that began two days later. (Beard did not play Plunket Shield cricket until 1950–51, when he played for Central Districts in their inaugural match. He later played Test cricket.)

Buchan took 3 for 57 and 3 for 70 against Otago (match figures of 66–21–127–6), and made 37 batting at number 10 in the first innings, but Otago won by three wickets. In the second match of the Shield a few days later, he took 7 for 66 off 39.1 overs in Canterbury's first innings, but again Wellington lost. It was the only seven-wicket haul in that season's Plunket Shield. When the touring Australians played Wellington later in the season, Buchan took 4 for 99 off 42.1 overs. All four of his victims – Lindsay Hassett, Keith Miller, Colin McCool and Bruce Dooland – were bowled. He was the only New Zealander to take more than three wickets in an innings in the four provincial matches against the Australians. Despite his successful season, he played no further first-class cricket.
