= Robbie Diver =

New Zealand cricketer (born 1974)

Personal information
- Born: 19 September 1974 (age 52); Auckland, New Zealand
- Source: Cricinfo, 1 November 2020

Robbie Diver (born 19 September 1974) is a New Zealand cricketer. He played in two first-class and three List A matches for Northern Districts from 1997 to 1999.

== See also ==
- List of Northern Districts representative cricketers
