= Stu McLaggan =

New Zealand cricketer (born 1945)

Personal information
- Full name: Donald Stuart McLaggan
- Born: 8 July 1945 (age 81); Lower Hutt, New Zealand
- Source: Cricinfo, 1 November 2020

Stu McLaggan (born 8 July 1945) is a New Zealand cricketer. He played in one List A match for Northern Districts in 1973/74.

== See also ==
- List of Northern Districts representative cricketers
