= John Bailey (New Zealand cricketer) =

New Zealand cricketer (born 1941)

Personal information
- Born: 29 October 1941 (age 85); Preston, England
- Source: Cricinfo, 1 November 2020

John Bailey (born 29 October 1941) is a New Zealand cricketer. He played in four first-class matches for Northern Districts in 1965/66.

== See also ==
- List of Northern Districts representative cricketers
