= Geoffrey Taylor (cricketer) =

New Zealand cricketer (born 1949)

Personal information
- Born: 22 July 1949 (age 77); Waipawa, New Zealand
- Source: Cricinfo, 1 November 2020

Geoffrey Taylor (born 22 July 1949) is a New Zealand cricketer. He played in seven first-class and two List A matches for Northern Districts from 1973 to 1975.

== See also ==
- List of Northern Districts representative cricketers
