= Mark McKinnon (cricketer) =

New Zealand cricketer (born 1960)

Personal information
- Born: 10 April 1960 (age 66); Auckland, New Zealand
- Source: Cricinfo, 1 November 2020

Mark McKinnon (born 10 April 1960) is a New Zealand cricketer. He played in fourteen first-class matches for Northern Districts from 1983 to 1989.

== See also ==
- List of Northern Districts representative cricketers
