= Lance Mountain (cricketer) =

New Zealand cricketer (born 1940)

Personal information
- Full name: Lance Sydney Mountain
- Born: 7 September 1940 (age 86); Kawakawa, Northland, New Zealand
- Batting: Right-handed
- Role: Wicket-keeper

Domestic team information
- Years: Team
- 1967/68–1973/74: Northern Districts

Career statistics
Competition	First-class	List A
Matches	38	3
Runs scored	892	45
Batting average	14.86	22.50
100s/50s	0/1	0/0
Top score	51	21*
Balls bowled	8	–
Wickets	0	–
Bowling average	–	–
5 wickets in innings	–	–
10 wickets in match	–	–
Best bowling	–	–
Catches/stumpings	64/23	2/2
- Source: Cricinfo, 4 March 2018

Lance Sydney Mountain (born 7 September 1940) is a former cricketer who played first-class cricket for Northern Districts in New Zealand from 1967 to 1974.

Born at Kawakawa in Northland, Lance Mountain was Northern Districts' wicket-keeper for seven seasons. His only first-class match for another team was for North Island in 1970–71.

He also played Hawke Cup cricket for Northland from 1959 to 1978. The annual award for the best wicket-keeper in Northland club cricket is the Lance Mountain Trophy.
