= Joseph Yovich =

New Zealand cricketer (born 1976)

Joseph Adam Frank Yovich (born 15 December 1976) is a New Zealand cricketer of Croatian descent.

== Biography ==
A solid all-rounder for Northern Districts, he debuted in the 1994/95 season and went on to become the first player to take 100 wickets and score 1000 runs in List A one-day cricket for the team. One of the few players to have played 100 first-class games for the side, by the end of the 2012/13 season, he had 255 first-class wickets and 4839 runs, having converted himself to a top-order batsman in the latter years of his ND career. This makes him the only player in New Zealand cricket to have done both the List A 100 wickets/1000 runs double and the first-class 200 wickets/2000 runs double for a single Major Association team.

Born in Whangārei, Yovich was part of the Whangārei Boys' High School 1st XI side which won the national secondary schools' competition, the Gillette Cup, in 1994, beating Auckland private school King's College in the final. A right-arm pace bowler and powerful left-hand batsman, he represented New Zealand at the youth level, touring England with the New Zealand Under-19s and Australia with the New Zealand Under-20s in 1996; and represented New Zealand at the 2003 Hong Kong Sixes. He toured India and Australia with New Zealand A in 2001 and 2006 respectively, and was also named in the preliminary New Zealand squad for the 2003 World Cup.

In 2005–06 he and Mark Orchard added 322 for the sixth wicket against Central Districts in Napier for the sixth wicket record. He was named Northern Districts Cricketer of the Year twice, in 1999/2000 and 2005/06, and New Zealand Domestic Twenty20 MVP player of the series in the 2008/09 season.

Yovich has also played for Northland in the Hawke Cup and was named Northland Sportsman of the Year in 2003.

Yovich is a founding member of the New Zealand Croatia cricket club, formed in 2013.
