= Roland Calland =

New Zealand cricketer (born 1946)

Personal information
- Born: 11 October 1946 (age 80); Paeroa, New Zealand
- Source: Cricinfo, 1 November 2020

Roland Calland (born 11 October 1946) is a New Zealand cricketer. He played in one first-class match for Northern Districts in 1977/78.

== See also ==
- List of Northern Districts representative cricketers
