= William Duncan (New Zealand cricketer) =

New Zealand cricketer

Personal information
- Born: 29 December 1933; Christchurch, New Zealand
- Died: 24 August 2008 (aged 74); Christchurch, New Zealand
- Source: Cricinfo, 1 November 2020

William Duncan (29 December 1933 – 24 August 2008) was a New Zealand cricketer. He played in five first-class matches for Northern Districts in 1957/58.

== See also ==
- List of Northern Districts representative cricketers
