= Graeme Tarr =

New Zealand cricketer (1936–2020)

Graeme Maxwell Tarr
Personal information
- Full name: Graeme Maxwell Tarr
- Born: 20 November 1936; Hamilton, New Zealand
- Died: 8 December 2020 (aged 84); Auckland, New Zealand
- Source: Cricinfo, 1 November 2020

Graeme Maxwell Tarr (20 November 1936 – 8 December 2020) was a New Zealand cricketer. He played in eight first-class matches for Northern Districts from 1957 to 1959.

== See also ==
- List of Northern Districts representative cricketers
