= Murray Child =

New Zealand cricketer (born 1953)

Murray John Child (born 1 September 1953) is a former New Zealand cricketer who played in first-class and List A cricket for Northern Districts and also for Northland in the Hawke Cup. He was born in Whangārei.

He is a New Zealand champion sheepdog trialist. He captained the New Zealand team in 2014. He lives in Maungakaramea on the farm his family has owned since the mid-19th century.

He is the son of Ellis Child, who was also a first-class cricketer and champion sheepdog trialist.
