= Jerome White =

Jerome White is the name of:

- Jerome White (singer) (born 1981)
- Jerome White (socialist) (born 1959)

== See also ==
- Jerry White (disambiguation)
