= Michael Poultney =

New Zealand cricketer (born 1950)

Personal information
- Born: 10 July 1950 (age 76); Hamilton, New Zealand
- Source: Cricinfo, 1 November 2020

Michael Poultney (born 10 July 1950) is a New Zealand cricketer. He played in one first-class matches for Northern Districts in 1972/73.

== See also ==
- List of Northern Districts representative cricketers
