= William Holt (cricketer) =

New Zealand cricketer

Personal information
- Full name: William Roberts Holt
- Born: 31 May 1935; Whangarei, Northland, New Zealand
- Died: April 2024 (aged 88); Brisbane, Australia
- Batting: Right-handed
- Bowling: Right-arm medium
- Role: Bowler

Domestic team information
- Years: Team
- 1964/65: Northern Districts
- FC debut: 4 February 1965 Northern Districts v Pakistanis
- Last FC: 8 February 1965 Northern Districts v Canterbury

Career statistics
Competition	First-class
Matches	2
Runs scored	37
Batting average	18.50
100s/50s	0/0
Top score	32
Balls bowled	279
Wickets	4
Bowling average	35.00
5 wickets in innings	0
10 wickets in match	0
Best bowling	2/42
Catches/stumpings	0/–
- Source: CricketArchive, 13 June 2008

William Roberts Holt (31 May 1935 – April 2024) was a New Zealand cricketer, who played two first-class cricket matches for Northern Districts in the 1964–65 season. A right-arm medium pace bowler, Holt took four wickets at 35.00, and scored 37 runs with the bat at 18.50. He also played ten matches for Northland in the Hawke Cup.

== Life and career ==
Holt was born in Whangarei, Northland. He played his first cricket match for Northland against Waikato as part of the 1962/63 Hawke Cup on 24 November 1962. When Northland played the touring Pakistani national team on 26 December 1964, Holt took the wicket of Mohammad Ilyas from his 22 overs, conceding 54 runs. With the bat, batting at number nine, he scored nine and 36 as Northland were forced to follow on, and were eventually defeated by ten wickets.

On 4 January 1965 Holt played for Northland against Poverty Bay, taking a career-best 6/80 from his 35 overs. He then faced Pakistan on 4 February 1965 playing for Northern Districts in Hamilton. He took the wickets of Abdul Kadir and the final wicket of Afaq Hussain, from his 16.3 overs, conceding 42 runs. Pakistan were forced to follow on, Holt bowling nine more overs for 21 runs before the match ended as a draw. Two days later, Holt played his second and last match for the Northern Districts, against Canterbury in the Plunket Shield. Canterbury batted first, Holt bowling 21 overs, taking 2/77. He was then run out for 32. Northern Districts were forced to follow on, however the match ended as a draw before Holt batted again.

Holt returned to Northland for a match of the Hawke Cup on 27 March 1965 against Bay of Plenty. Holt took 2/48 and scored 25*.

Holt died in Brisbane in April 2024.
