= Keir Bettley =

New Zealand cricketer (born 1984)

Personal information
- Born: 17 August 1984 (age 42); Hamilton, New Zealand
- Source: Cricinfo, 1 November 2020

Keir Bettley (born 17 August 1984) is a New Zealand cricketer. He played in one first-class match for Northern Districts in 2010.

== See also ==
- List of Northern Districts representative cricketers
