= Stuart Harris (cricketer) =

New Zealand cricketer (born 1943)

Personal information
- Born: 12 August 1943 (age 83); New Plymouth, New Zealand
- Source: Cricinfo, 1 November 2020

Stuart Harris (born 12 August 1943) is a New Zealand cricketer. He played in one first-class match for Northern Districts in 1975/76.

== See also ==
- List of Northern Districts representative cricketers
