= Jeremy White (cricketer) =

New Zealand cricketer (born 1947)

Personal information
- Born: 15 October 1947 (age 79); Ongaonga, New Zealand
- Source: Cricinfo, 1 November 2020

Jeremy White (born 15 October 1947) is a New Zealand cricketer. He played in one List A and seven first-class matches for Northern Districts from 1972 to 1974.

== See also ==
- List of Northern Districts representative cricketers
