= Alan Stimpson =

New Zealand cricketer

Personal information
- Full name: Alan James Peter Stimpson
- Born: 9 July 1951; Auckland, New Zealand
- Died: 22 August 1994 (aged 43); Auckland, New Zealand
- Batting: Right-handed
- Bowling: Right-arm fast-medium
- Role: Bowler

Domestic team information
- Years: Team
- 1974/75–1978/79: Northern Districts

Career statistics
Competition	First-class	List A
Matches	24	8
Runs scored	231	35
Batting average	9.62	17.50
100s/50s	0/0	0/0
Top score	36	19*
Balls bowled	3,972	432
Wickets	61	10
Bowling average	33.16	29.90
5 wickets in innings	3	0
10 wickets in match	0	0
Best bowling	6/46	2/15
Catches/stumpings	7/–	2/–
- Source: Cricinfo, 31 January 2021

Alan Stimpson (9 July 1951 – 22 August 1994) was a New Zealand cricketer. He played in twenty-four first-class and eight List A matches for Northern Districts from 1974 to 1979.

Stimpson attended Takapuna Grammar School. He was a right-arm opening bowler. His best first-class figures were 6 for 46 when Northern Districts beat Wellington in 1975–76. His most successful season was his last, 1978–79, when he took 22 wickets at an average of 27.77. He was selected in a New Zealand Invitational XI for a one-day match against the touring Australians in January 1977, which the New Zealand team won by 12 runs.

In August 1994 Stimpson's body was found on Manukau Harbour mudflats. He had been drinking and had drowned after hurting his head in a fall.
