= Bernard Graham =

New Zealand cricketer

Personal information
- Full name: Bernard Neylon Graham
- Born: 27 October 1922; Gisborne, New Zealand
- Died: 14 June 1992 (aged 69); Gisborne, New Zealand
- Batting: Right-handed

Domestic team information
- Years: Team
- 1953/54: Auckland
- 1956/57: Northern Districts

Career statistics
Competition	First-class
Matches	6
Runs scored	151
Batting average	13.72
100s/50s	0/1
Top score	56
Catches/stumpings	2/–
- Source: Cricinfo, 13 January 2021

Bernard Graham (27 October 1922 – 14 June 1992) was a New Zealand cricketer. He played first-class cricket for Auckland and Northern Districts between 1953 and 1957.

Graham opened the batting with James Everest for Northern Districts in 1956–57, their inaugural first-class season. He made his highest score of 56 against Otago that season. He also played Hawke Cup cricket for Poverty Bay from 1950 to 1961.
