= Derek Beard =

New Zealand cricketer

Personal information
- Full name: Derek Andrew Beard
- Born: 10 September 1961 (age 65); Te Aroha, New Zealand
- Batting: Right-handed
- Bowling: Right-arm medium
- Role: Bowler
- Relatives: Don Beard (father)

Domestic team information
- Years: Team
- 1987/88–1990/91: Northern Districts

Career statistics
Competition	First-class	List A
Matches	8	18
Runs scored	99	109
Batting average	14.14	15.57
100s/50s	0/0	0/0
Top score	28	30
Balls bowled	1,284	798
Wickets	23	22
Bowling average	26.69	19.36
5 wickets in innings	1	1
10 wickets in match	0	0
Best bowling	6/18	5/34
Catches/stumpings	3/–	3/–
- Source: Cricinfo, 18 December 2019

Derek Andrew Beard (born 10 September 1961) is a former New Zealand cricketer who played first-class and List A cricket for Northern Districts from 1987 to 1991. His father, Don Beard, played Test cricket for New Zealand in the 1950s.

A medium-pace bowler, Beard's best first-class figures were 6 for 18 (off 10 overs) against Central Districts in 1989–90. In List A cricket his best figures were 5 for 34, the first five wickets to fall, also against Central Districts, in 1990–91.

A science teacher at Mount Maunganui College, Beard played 105 representative matches for Bay of Plenty. In 2016 he was awarded life membership of the Bay of Plenty Cricket Association.
