= Roger Kneebone =

British professor

Professor Roger Kneebone
- Born: Roger Lister Kneebone; February 1954 (age 72)
- Known for: Medical education
- Medical career
- Institutions: Imperial College

Roger Lister Kneebone (born February 1954) is a British professor of surgical education at Imperial College London.

A graduate of St Andrews and Manchester universities, he performed trauma procedures in the war zones of Southern Africa before working as a general practitioner in Wiltshire and after completing a PhD. Upon return, he became involved in medical education based around simulation and computer-based learning, challenging the "documentary framework". He co-founded the United Kingdom's only Master's in Education in Surgical Education.

== Early life ==
Kneebone was born in February 1954 and attended Westminster School, London. He then studied medicine at St Andrews and Manchester universities. He received his PhD in surgical education from the University of Bath.

== Career ==
=== Medicine ===
Kneebone performed trauma procedures in the war zones of Southern Africa before returning to London in the late 1980s. Over the next 15 years he practised surgery at the local cottage hospital, while he also continued to practice as a general practitioner (GP) in Trowbridge, Wiltshire and becoming increasingly involved in GP training. Over the next decade he established an innovative national training programme for minor surgery within the primary care setting, based around simulation, computer-based learning and intensive workshops.

In 2003, Kneebone left his practice to join Imperial College, London.

Kneebone has worked with other professions to obtain insights into their working practices that can be applied in surgery. These include racing teams, puppeteers and jazz musicians, who all have distinctive skills such as the need for teamwork or careful timing. He has said that he feels that young surgeons required greater craft skills, and has worked with tailors to observe their skill in sewing. His published dialogue with instalment artist David Cotterrell concluded with one point being that a greater sense of truth and empathetic understanding could sometimes be obtained from historical medical sketches and paintings than from photographic images and that simulation challenges the "documentary framework".

In 2005, with Dr Kirsten Dalrymple he commenced the United Kingdom's only Masters in Education in Surgical Education. In 2011, he became a National Teaching Fellow. In 2016, with Professor Aaron Williamon, he led the Royal College of Music – Imperial College Centre for Performance Science, tackling major challenges to performance in the arts, medicine, engineering, natural sciences, and business. With his co-director Dr Fernando Bello, he guides the Imperial College Centre for Engagement and Simulation Science, established within the Chelsea & Westminster campus, aiming to bring together clinicians, scientists, patients, the public and experts outside medicine.

=== Writing ===
In 2020, Kneebone's book, Expert: Understanding the Path to Mastery, was published by Viking.

== Personal life ==
Kneebone lives in London. He is married and has two daughters. His hobbies include listening to jazz, playing the harpsichord and walking.

== Selected publications ==
- "New professional roles in surgery", co-authored with Ala Darzi, British Medical Journal, 2005 Apr 9; 330(7495): 803–804.doi:10.1136/bmj.330.7495.803.
- “Simulation, safety and surgery”, Quality & Safety in Health Care. 2010 Oct;19 Suppl 3:i47-52. doi:10.1136/qshc.2010.042424
- "Bringing surgical history to life", British Medical Journal, 2012; 345: e8135. PMID 23249666, doi:10.1136/bmj.e8135.
- “Recapturing the History of Surgical Practice Through Simulation-based Re-enactment”, co-authored with Abigail Woods, Medical History, January 2014, pp. 106–121, doi:10.1017/mdh.2013.75
