= Stuart Harris-Logan =

Stuart Harris-Logan (often credited as 'Stuart A. Harris-Logan') is a Celticist, folklorist and writer living in Scotland. He is the author of Singing With Blackbirds (2006) and Royal Conservatoire of Scotland: Raising the Curtain (2021). He is Keeper of Archives & Collections at the Royal Conservatoire of Scotland.

== See also ==
- Poetry of Scotland
- Scottish folklore
