= Doug Carswell =

New Zealand cricketer

Personal information
- Full name: Robert Douglas Carswell
- Born: 19 March 1936; Gisborne, New Zealand
- Died: 22 May 2022 (aged 86); Bethlehem, New Zealand
- Batting: Right-handed
- Bowling: Right-arm off break

Domestic team information
- Years: Team
- 1956/57–1968/69: Poverty Bay
- 1957/58: Northern Districts
- Source: Cricinfo, 31 December 2023

Robert Douglas Carswell (19 March 1936 – 22 March 2022) was a New Zealand cricketer. He played in one first-class match for Northern Districts during the 1957–58 season.

Carswell was born at Gisborne in Poverty Bay in 1936. He played cricket regularly for Poverty Bay, including in the Hawke Cup, but made only a single first-class appearance. Playing against Canterbury in December 1957 Carswell scored eight runs in his only first-class innings. He was hit on the head whilst batting and retired hurt, but later returned to the crease. He was replaced for Northern Districts' next match by Peter Skelton, unable to play due to his injury which required an operation on his cheek bone.
