= Morrinsville Recreation Ground =

Cricket ground in Morrinsville, New Zealand

Coordinates: 37°39′46.76″S 175°31′25.79″E

- Interactive map of Morrinsville Recreation Ground

Ground information
- Location: Morrinsville, New Zealand
- Country: New Zealand
- Establishment: 1976 (first recorded match)

Team information
Northern Districts	(1987–1989)
- As of 3 November 2011; Source: Ground profile

Morrinsville Recreation Ground is a cricket ground in Morrinsville, Waikato, New Zealand. The first recorded cricket match held on the ground came in 1980 when Thames Valley played Bay of Plenty in the 1975/76 Hawke Cup. The ground later held a first-class match in the 1986/87 Shell Trophy when Northern Districts played Central Districts. A second first-class match was held there in the 1988/89 Shell Trophy when Northern Districts played Wellington. First-class cricket hasn't been played there since. A single Youth One Day International was held there in 1988 when New Zealand Under-19s played India Under-19s.
