= Cooperative Business New Zealand =

- Abbreviation: Cooperative Business NZ
- Formation: 1984
- Type: Non-governmental organisation
- Headquarters: Auckland
- Location: National
- Members: Membership available for cooperative and mutual businesses. Companies from outside the co-operative business sector can apply to become Corporate Associate Members.
- Chief Executive: Roz Henry
- Website: nz.coop

Cooperative Business New Zealand brings together New Zealand's co-operative and mutual businesses in a not-for-profit incorporated society which provides support to its members, raises the profile and awareness of co-operative and mutual enterprise, and promotes the co-operative business model.

The organisation started its life in March 1984 as the New Zealand Agricultural Cooperatives Association; the name was changed to the New Zealand Cooperatives Association in May 1997, and to Cooperative Business New Zealand at the December 2012 AGM which was in Christchurch.

Cooperative Business NZ is a member of the International Cooperative Alliance.

== Aims ==
The aims of Cooperative Business New Zealand are to:

- PROMOTE: encourage, promote and advance New Zealand co-operatives and mutuals.
- REPRESENT: act as a representative association for those engaged as co-operatives.
- ADVOCATE: promote discussion and co-operation with decision-makers at all levels of government designed to further the interests of the co-operative sector.
- INFORM: collect, verify, and publish information relating to the co-operative sector.
- SUPPORT: provide services and expertise to those engaged in the co-operative sector and to carry out research into all aspects of the business model.

== Organisation structure ==
With an office in Newmarket, Auckland, Cooperative Business New Zealand employs Chief Executive, Roz Henry.

The Board is currently made up by six directors who belong to member organisations, as well as an independent director. The current Chair is Christine Burr.

== New Zealand member co-operatives ==
As at March 2017, Cooperative Business NZ has more than 100 members. See https://nz.coop/members/

== For more information ==
- Official website

== See also ==
- Cooperative
- Co-operative News - https://web.archive.org/web/20071013030531/http://www.thenews.coop/
- A New Economy - http://www.aneweconomy.ca/about
