= John McFarlane (cricketer) =

New Zealand cricketer

Personal information
- Born: 30 September 1933; Mount Gambier, South Australia
- Died: May 2010; Seoul, South Korea
- Source: Cricinfo, 1 November 2020

John McFarlane (30 September 1933 – May 2010) was a New Zealand cricketer. He played in one first-class match for Northern Districts in 1964/65.

== See also ==
- List of Northern Districts representative cricketers
