= Dennis Matthews (footballer) =

Australian rules footballer

Personal information
- Full name: Dennis Matthews
- Born: 25 April 1952 (age 74)
- Original team: Kerang
- Height: 188 cm (6 ft 2 in)
- Weight: 81 kg (179 lb)

Playing career^{1}
Years	Club	Games (Goals)
1971	South Melbourne	1 (0)
- ^{1} Playing statistics correct to the end of 1971.

Dennis Matthews (born 25 April 1952) is a former Australian rules footballer who played with South Melbourne in the Victorian Football League (VFL).
