= Rod Griffiths =

New Zealand cricketer (1948–2018)

Personal information
- Full name: Roderick Joseph Griffiths
- Born: 20 April 1948; Blenheim, New Zealand
- Died: 15 October 2018 (aged 70); Wanganui, New Zealand
- Batting: Right-handed
- Bowling: Left-arm fast-medium

Domestic team information
- Years: Team
- 1975/76–1980/81: Northern Districts
- Source: Cricinfo, 1 November 2020

Roderick Joseph Griffiths (20 April 1948 – 15 October 2018) was a New Zealand cricketer. He played in seven first-class matches for Northern Districts from 1975 to 1981.

== See also ==
- List of Northern Districts representative cricketers
