= Terence Burns (cricketer) =

New Zealand cricketer

Personal information
- Full name: Terence Arthur Burns
- Born: 15 April 1938 (age 88); Lower Hutt, Wellington, New Zealand
- Batting: Right-handed
- Bowling: Right-arm medium
- Role: Bowler

Domestic team information
- Years: Team
- 1964/65: Northern Districts
- FC debut: 4 February 1965 Northern Districts v Pakistanis
- Last FC: 10 February 1965 Northern Districts v Canterbury

Career statistics
Competition	First-class
Matches	2
Runs scored	9
Batting average	4.50
100s/50s	0/0
Top score	7
Balls bowled	305
Wickets	5
Bowling average	27.20
5 wickets in innings	0
10 wickets in match	0
Best bowling	3/16
Catches/stumpings	0/–
- Source: CricketArchive, 17 September 2008

Terence Arthur Burns (born 15 April 1938) is a former New Zealand cricketer. Born in Wellington, Burns was a right-handed bat and right-arm medium-pace bowler who took five wickets in his two first-class matches for Northern Districts during the 1964–65 season.

== Career ==
Burns played his two first-class matches in February 1965, both in Seddon Park in Hamilton, New Zealand, against the touring Pakistan side and Canterbury. Against the Pakistanis, on 4 February, Burns made seven runs in Northern Districts' only innings, and took three wickets in his first innings with the ball, those of Ghulam Abbas, Masood-ul-Hasan and Farooq Hamid. In his second match he took two Canterbury wickets in their first innings, and made two runs in Northern Districts' first innings. The match was drawn as Northern Districts, following on, ended the final day five down with Burns not required to bat.
