= Jeff Freeman =

New Zealand cricketer (born 1950)

Personal information
- Born: 10 May 1950 (age 76); Wellington, New Zealand
- Source: Cricinfo, 1 November 2020

Jeff Freeman (born 10 May 1950) is a New Zealand cricketer. He played in one List A and five first-class matches for Northern Districts from 1972 to 1976.

== See also ==
- List of Northern Districts representative cricketers
