= Kevin Kennedy (cricketer) =

New Zealand cricketer (born 1945)

Personal information
- Born: 21 January 1945 (age 81); Gisborne, New Zealand
- Source: Cricinfo, 1 November 2020

Kevin Kennedy (born 21 January 1945) is a New Zealand cricketer. He played in one List A and thirty first-class matches for Northern Districts from 1964 to 1975.

== See also ==
- List of Northern Districts representative cricketers
