= Craig Presland =

New Zealand cricketer (born 1960)

Personal information
- Full name: Craig Miller Presland
- Born: 22 May 1960 (age 66); Whangārei, New Zealand
- Batting: Right-handed
- Bowling: Right-arm medium

Domestic team information
- Years: Team
- 1982/83–1984/85: Northern Districts
- 1984: Bedfordshire

Career statistics
Competition	First-class	List A
Matches	14	9
Runs scored	503	90
Batting average	26.47	15.00
100s/50s	0/4	0/0
Top score	97*	24
Balls bowled	1,785	354
Wickets	32	11
Bowling average	31.50	28.90
5 wickets in innings	1	0
10 wickets in match	0	0
Best bowling	5/49	3/28
Catches/stumpings	8/–	3/–
- Source: Cricinfo, 28 July 2019

Craig Miller Presland (born 22 May 1960) is a New Zealand former cricketer and the current chief executive of the New Zealand Co-operative.

== Education ==
After attending Kamo High School between 1973 and 1977, Presland graduated with a Bachelor of Commerce from the University of Auckland in 1981.

== Cricket career ==
He made his debut in first-class cricket for Northern Districts against Auckland at Gisborne in the 1982–83 Shell Trophy. He played first-class cricket for Northern Districts until December 1984, making a total of fourteen appearances. Playing as an all-rounder, he scored 503 runs in his fourteen first-class matches, at an average of 26.47 and a highest score of 97 not out. With his right-arm medium pace bowling, he took 32 wickets at a bowling average of 31.50. He took a five wicket haul once, with figures of 5 for 49 against Canterbury in the 1988–89 Shell Trophy. Presland also played List A one-day cricket for Northern Districts, debuting in that format against Canterbury at Hamilton in the 1982–83 Shell Cup. He played List A cricket for Northern Districts until December 1984, making a total of nine appearances. He scored 90 runs in one-day cricket, with a high score of 37. With the ball, he took 11 wickets an average of 28.90 and best figures of 3 for 28. In addition to playing first-class and List A cricket in New Zealand, Presland also played minor counties cricket in England for Bedfordshire in 1984, making seven appearances in the Minor Counties Championship and a single appearance in the MCCA Knockout Trophy.

== Business career ==
A business graduate of the University of Auckland, Presland has served in a number of executive positions with Emery Worldwide, Fletcher Building, healthAlliance, International SOS NZ and ABC Childcare Centres. He was the chief operating officer of New Zealand Cricket from 2012 to 2014. He was appointed the chief executive of the New Zealand Co-operative in April 2016. Presland has been Chairman of Parnell Cricket Club since 2015.
