= Douglas Clarke (New Zealand cricketer) =

New Zealand cricketer

Personal information
- Born: 30 July 1932; Kaponga, New Zealand
- Died: 31 January 2005 (aged 72); Morrinsville, New Zealand
- Source: Cricinfo, 1 November 2020

Douglas Clarke (30 July 1932 – 31 January 2005) was a New Zealand cricketer. He played in six first-class matches for Northern Districts from 1957 to 1961.

== See also ==
- List of Northern Districts representative cricketers
