= Kirti Puna =

New Zealand cricketer (born 1955)

Personal information
- Full name: Kirti Narotam Puna
- Born: 10 September 1955 (age 71); Hamilton, New Zealand
- Source: Cricinfo, 1 November 2020

Kirti Puna (born 10 September 1955) is a New Zealand cricketer. He played in nine first-class and three List A matches for Northern Districts from 1971 to 1979.

== See also ==
- List of Northern Districts representative cricketers
