= Richard Morgan (cricketer) =

New Zealand cricketer (born 1972)

Personal information
- Full name: Richard Glen Morgan
- Born: 24 June 1972 (age 54); Wellington, New Zealand
- Batting: Right-handed
- Bowling: Left-arm medium
- Relatives: Harry Morgan (father)

Domestic team information
- Years: Team
- 1993/94: Northern Districts
- 1998/99–2002/03: Auckland

Career statistics
Competition	First-class	List A
Matches	9	21
Runs scored	161	181
Batting average	14.63	16.45
100s/50s	0/0	0/0
Top score	27*	44
Balls bowled	1,704	924
Wickets	29	16
Bowling average	26.65	41.68
5 wickets in innings	2	0
10 wickets in match	0	0
Best bowling	5/44	3/31
Catches/stumpings	3/–	4/–
- Source: Cricinfo, 15 September 2018

Richard Glen Morgan (born 24 July 1972 in Wellington) is a former New Zealand cricketer who played first-class cricket for Auckland and Northern Districts from 1993 to 2002. His father, Harry Morgan, played for Wellington from 1963 to 1978.

Richard Morgan was a left-arm medium-pace bowler and right-handed tail-end batsman. His best bowling figures were 5 for 44, for Auckland against Northern Districts in 2000–01. He retired after the 2002–03 season.
