= Ellis Child =

New Zealand cricketer

Personal information
- Full name: Ellis Lynley Child
- Born: 23 December 1925; Whangārei, New Zealand
- Died: 8 May 2005 (aged 79); Auckland, New Zealand
- Batting: Right-handed
- Bowling: Right-arm medium
- Role: All-rounder

Domestic team information
- Years: Team
- 1953/54: Auckland
- 1958/59: Northern Districts

Career statistics
Competition	First-class
Matches	8
Runs scored	230
Batting average	19.16
100s/50s	0/0
Top score	41
Balls bowled	1722
Wickets	21
Bowling average	27.38
5 wickets in innings	2
10 wickets in match	0
Best bowling	5/37
Catches/stumpings	5/–
- Source: Cricinfo, 23 August 2019

Ellis Lynley Child (23 December 1925 – 8 May 2005) was a New Zealand cricketer who played first-class cricket for Auckland and Northern Districts in the 1950s. He was also a leading player for Northland in the Hawke Cup from 1951 to 1961.

A right-arm medium-pace bowler and useful lower-order batsman, Child took his best bowling figures in his second match. In Auckland's 32-run victory over Otago, he took 4 for 54 and 5 for 37. He captained Northland to their first Hawke Cup title in January 1956, when they defeated Hutt Valley.

Child was the father of Neville Child, Murray Child, Roger Child and Graham Child, all of whom played cricket at various levels for Northland. Murray also played for Northern Districts. Graham was also an accomplished hockey player, representing Auckland and New Zealand. The family has been prominent in sheepdog trials in New Zealand for more than 50 years. Ellis was President of the New Zealand Sheep Dog Trial Association.
