= Michael Pocock (cricketer) =

New Zealand cricketer (born 1945)

Personal information
- Born: 18 December 1945 (age 80); Te Kūiti, New Zealand
- Source: Cricinfo, 1 November 2020

Michael Pocock (born 18 December 1945) is a New Zealand cricketer. He played in four first-class matches for Northern Districts in 1965/66.

== See also ==
- List of Northern Districts representative cricketers
