= Barry Roberts (Australian rules footballer) =

Australian rules footballer

Personal information
- Full name: Barry Roberts
- Born: 28 October 1937 (age 89)
- Original team: Preston Thirds
- Height: 188 cm (6 ft 2 in)
- Weight: 79 kg (174 lb)

Playing career
Years	Club	Games (Goals)
1957–1958	Fitzroy	9 (1)

Barry Roberts (born 28 October 1937) is a former Australian rules footballer who played for the Fitzroy Football Club in the Victorian Football League (VFL).
