= Malcolm Harding (cricketer) =

New Zealand cricketer (born 1959)

Personal information
- Born: 28 May 1959 (age 67); Hamilton, New Zealand
- Source: Cricinfo, 1 November 2020

Malcolm Harding (born 28 May 1959) is a New Zealand cricketer. He played in four first-class matches for Northern Districts in 1986/87.

== See also ==
- List of Northern Districts representative cricketers
