= John Blackmore (cricketer) =

New Zealand cricketer (born 1948)

Personal information
- Born: 1 January 1948 (age 78); Hastings, New Zealand
- Source: Cricinfo, 1 November 2020

John Blackmore (born 1 January 1948) is a New Zealand cricketer. He played in one List A and fourteen first-class matches for Northern Districts from 1968 to 1973.

== See also ==
- List of Northern Districts representative cricketers
