= James Everest =

New Zealand cricketer (1918–1992)

Jim Everest
- Everest in 1957

Personal information
- Full name: James Kerse Everest
- Born: 28 March 1918; Hamilton, New Zealand
- Died: 28 September 1992 (aged 74); Hamilton, New Zealand
- Batting: Left-handed
- Bowling: Right-arm medium
- Role: Opening batsman

Domestic team information
- Years: Team
- 1954/55–1955/56: Auckland
- 1956/57: Northern Districts

Career statistics
Competition	First-class
Matches	13
Runs scored	809
Batting average	36.77
100s/50s	2/4
Top score	104
Catches/stumpings	2/–
- Source: Cricinfo, 17 June 2018

James Kerse Everest (28 March 1918 – 28 September 1992) was a New Zealand cricketer. He played first-class cricket for Auckland and Northern Districts between 1954 and 1957.

== Early life and career ==
Jim Everest was born in Hamilton and attended Hamilton Technical College. He was part of the first Waikato team to win the Hawke Cup. He scored 53 and 16 when they successfully challenged Manawatu in a close match in February 1938 and remained in the team that held the trophy until they lost to Manawatu in January 1940.

In World War II he served as a private in the New Zealand 24th Battalion in the Mediterranean campaigns and was taken prisoner.

He continued to play for Waikato after the war, captaining them when they regained the Hawke Cup for the first time since 1940 in the last match of the 1950–51 season. He also played for the new Northern Districts team in its first non-first-class matches. In 1953-54 he played in the Northern Districts teams that beat Auckland twice in three-day matches.

== First-class career ==
In 1954–55, at the age of 36, Everest finally made his first-class debut, playing for Auckland. Auckland lost all four matches in the Plunket Shield, but Everest was their second-highest-scoring batsman, with 221 runs at an average of 27.62. He scored Auckland's only century, 103 against Canterbury in the third match, out of a team total of 202. In the 1955–56 season he scored 212 runs for Auckland at 42.40, finishing seventh in the national Plunket Shield averages.

In 1956-57 Northern Districts were admitted to the Plunket Shield and played their first game against Auckland. Everest was one of the four members of the Northern Districts team for the first game who had previously played for Auckland (the others were Bernard Graham, Allen Lissette and Eric Petrie). The other seven members of the team were making their first-class debuts. Petrie, the captain, won the toss and decided to bat first, and Everest faced the first ball. He made 69, the highest score in a rain-affected draw. Having made Northern Districts' first fifty, Everest also made their first century, in the fourth match, against Canterbury. Again it was the highest score of the match.

Everest was one of the leading batsmen of the 1956-57 Plunket Shield season, with 376 runs at an average of 41.77, with one century and three fifties. He was also the outstanding batsman of the Hawke Cup season. He scored 49 and 29 when he captained Waikato to victory over Northland and the title, followed with 41 and 101 not out when they beat Thames Valley, and finished the season by scoring 264 against Manawatu, falling only eight runs short of the Hawke Cup record. He was named Batsman of the Year in the 1957 New Zealand Cricket Almanack.

== Legacy ==
Everest played no representative cricket after 1956–57. His Wisden obituary noted that at the time of his brief and late first-class career there were "complaints that his ability and powers of concentration should have won him consideration for a Test place long before".

In recognition of his important place in Northern Districts' early years, the official history written by Winston Hooper in 2006 to mark 50 seasons of first-class cricket for Northern Districts is called Everest to Vettori: The ND Story.
