= Jaden Hatwell =

New Zealand cricketer (born 1977)

Personal information
- Born: 1 December 1977 (age 48); Hamilton, New Zealand
- Source: Cricinfo, 1 November 2020

Jaden Hatwell (born 1 December 1977) is a New Zealand cricketer. He played in three first-class and nine List A matches for Northern Districts from 2001 to 2004.

== See also ==
- List of Northern Districts representative cricketers
