= Barry Roberts (cricketer) =

New Zealand cricketer

Personal information
- Full name: Barry Leonard Roberts
- Born: 15 June 1946; Suva, Fiji
- Died: 14 September 2025 (aged 79); Blenheim, New Zealand
- Batting: Right-handed
- Relatives: Lance Cairns (brother-in-law); Chris Cairns (nephew)

Domestic team information
- Years: Team
- 1977/78: Northern Districts

Career statistics
Competition	First-class	List A
Matches	2	1
Runs scored	40	33
Batting average	10.00	–
100s/50s	0/0	0/0
Top score	24	33*
Catches/stumpings	0/–	0/–
- Source: Cricinfo, 20 September 2025

Barry Leonard Roberts (15 June 1946 – 14 September 2025) was a New Zealand cricketer who played first-class and List A cricket for Northern Districts in 1977–78.

In his only List A match, Barry Roberts opened the batting for Northern Districts and made 33 not out as he and Dennis Lloyd successfully chased Auckland's total of 70 without losing a wicket.

Roberts was prominent in Hawke Cup cricket for more than 50 years. He played in the Marlborough team that won the title in 1967–68 for the first time, and the Taranaki team that won the title in 1970–71 and held it for two seasons. He also later played Hawke Cup cricket for Franklin and Hamilton. He returned to Marlborough in 1982, and coached the team for most of the time from then till 2005, including their second Hawke Cup title victory in 1993–94. He was awarded life membership of the Marlborough Cricket Association in 2019.

Roberts died in Blenheim on 14 September 2025, at the age of 79. In his memory, the Barry Roberts Cup was instituted for an annual match between the emerging players from Nelson and Marlborough.
