= Kingsley Smith (cricketer) =

New Zealand cricketer (born 1969)

Personal information
- Born: 15 September 1969 (age 57); Rotorua, New Zealand
- Source: Cricinfo, 1 November 2020

Kingsley Smith (born 15 September 1969) is a New Zealand cricketer. He played in one List A and three first-class matches for Northern Districts in 1993/94.

== See also ==
- List of Northern Districts representative cricketers
