= Kim Hancock =

New Zealand cricketer (born 1966)

Personal information
- Full name: Kim Bruce Hancock
- Born: 22 July 1966 (age 60); Matamata, Waikato, New Zealand
- Batting: Right-handed
- Bowling: Right-arm fast-medium

Domestic team information
- Years: Team
- 1985/86–1986/87: Northern Districts
- FC debut: 6 January 1986 Northern Districts v Wellington
- Last FC: 1 February 1987 Northern Districts v Central Districts

Career statistics
Competition	First-class
Matches	5
Runs scored	54
Batting average	13.50
100s/50s	0/0
Top score	31
Balls bowled	588
Wickets	9
Bowling average	51.00
5 wickets in innings	0
10 wickets in match	0
Best bowling	3/37
Catches/stumpings	3/–
- Source: CricInfo, 28 May 2009

Kim Bruce Hancock (born 22 July 1966) is a former New Zealand cricketer from Matamata, Waikato, who played five first-class matches for Northern Districts from 1985 to 1987.
