= Dennis Matthies =

American academic

Dennis Matthies (born April 12, 1946) is an American academic.

Matthies received a B.S. in physics from MIT in 1968 and an M.A. in Philosophy and Humanities in 1981 from Stanford University, where he taught until 1997.

From 1992 to 1997, at Stanford University's Center for Teaching and Learning (CTL), Dennis Matthies developed several experimental courses that have subsequently become known to a wider public. These include: Precision Questioning (which was initially taught in the Stanford Philosophy Department), Self Coaching, Mental Ecology, Think on Your Feet, and Concept Busting. In each subject the approach is practical and meta-cognitive.

These CTL subjects became part of a curriculum of short courses designed to prepare university students for both university learning and work in the 21st century. Through broadcasts on the Stanford Instructional Television Network, Precision Questioning and Self Coaching acquired a following in Silicon Valley. Different versions of Precision Questioning have been taught in universities inside and outside the United States.

From 1996 to 2004 the concept of Precision Questioning was developed further as a result of Dennis’s work as an independent contractor at Cypress Semiconductor in San Jose, California, at Microsoft Corporation, in Redmond, Washington, and at a number of other companies in Silicon Valley.

In 2004, with Professor Dr. Monica Worline from the Goizueta Business School at Emory University, Dennis co-founded Vervago, a content creation and training company that focuses on higher-order cognitive skills used by knowledge workers in areas of high complexity.

Dennis is a recipient of the Dinkelspiel Award for Outstanding Service to Undergraduate Education.

== Copyrighted Works ==
- 1989 – Learning with a Two-Track Mind, Notes in the Margins
- 1994 – Reading Faster, Reading Smarter (a)
- 1994 – Think on Your Feet (a)
- 1994 – Self-Coaching (a)
- 1994 – Accelerated Concept Mastery (a)
- 1995 – Precision Questioning (a)
- 1995 – Concept Busting (a)
- 1995 – Question-Driven Writing (a)
- 1996 – Self-Teaching (a)
- 1997 – Self-Coaching: When Getting Done Isn't Enough, Access

(a) Published through the Stanford University Bookstore.
