= Barry Roberts (rugby union) =

Australia international rugby union player

- Born: Barry Thomas Roberts; 3 October 1933 Sydney, Australia
- Died: 26 October 2017 Blackheath, New South Wales
- School: St Joseph's College

Rugby union career
- Position: wing
International career
Years	Team	Apps	(Points)
1956	Wallabies	1	(0)

Barry Thomas Roberts (3 October 1933 – 26 October 2017) was a rugby union player who represented Australia.

Roberts, a wing, was born in Sydney and claimed one international rugby cap for Australia. He played for St Joseph's College, Hunters Hill. Roberts played for Manly Rugby Club where he played 135 first grade games and scored 678 points. He played nine games for New South Wales between 1953 and 1960.

Roberts made his test debut in 1956 in the Wallabies’ second match against South Africa at the Brisbane Exhibition Ground. He also played seven non-Test games for Australia. Roberts also played against the British & Irish Lions for New South Wales in 1959.

Roberts was a talented hurdler in his youth.

== Published sources ==
- Howell, Max (2006) Born to Lead – Wallaby Test Captains (2005) Celebrity Books, New Zealand
