= Ross Kneebone =

New Zealand cricketer (born 1956)

Personal information
- Born: 1 August 1956 (age 70); Hamilton, New Zealand
- Source: Cricinfo, 1 November 2020

Ross Kneebone (born 1 August 1956) is a New Zealand cricketer. He played in two List A matches for Northern Districts in 1992/93.

== See also ==
- List of Northern Districts representative cricketers
