= Peter Smith (New Zealand cricketer) =

New Zealand cricketer (1935–2013)

Personal information
- Born: 8 March 1935; Wellington, New Zealand
- Died: 11 December 2013 (aged 78); Tauranga, New Zealand
- Source: Cricinfo, 1 November 2020

Peter Smith (8 March 1935 – 11 December 2013) was a New Zealand cricketer. He played in four first-class matches for Northern Districts in 1956/57.

== See also ==
- List of Northern Districts representative cricketers
