= Allen Lissette =

New Zealand cricketer

Allen Lissette MBE
- Lissette in 1963

Personal information
- Full name: Allen Fisher Lissette
- Born: 6 November 1919; Morrinsville, New Zealand
- Died: 24 January 1973 (aged 53); Hamilton, New Zealand
- Batting: Right-handed
- Bowling: Slow left-arm orthodox

International information
- National side: New Zealand (1956)
- Test debut (cap 77): 3 February 1956 v West Indies
- Last Test: 18 February 1956 v West Indies

Career statistics
Competition	Test	First-class
Matches	2	38
Runs scored	2	476
Batting average	1.00	10.81
100s/50s	0/0	0/0
Top score	1*	27*
Balls bowled	288	8,597
Wickets	3	116
Bowling average	41.33	25.89
5 wickets in innings	0	5
10 wickets in match	0	1
Best bowling	2/73	7/45
Catches/stumpings	1/–	20/–
- Source: Cricinfo, 1 April 2017

Allen Fisher Lissette MBE (6 November 1919 – 24 January 1973) was a New Zealand cricketer who played in two Test matches in 1956.

== Cricket career ==
A left-arm orthodox spinner, Lissette played for Waikato in the Hawke Cup from 1938 to 1970. He was 35 when he made his first-class debut in 1954–55 for Auckland.

After taking 7 for 50 in Auckland's victory over Otago in the Plunket Shield in January 1956 and four wickets against the touring West Indians in his next match, Lissette was selected for the first two Tests of the series against West Indies. He took three wickets, but New Zealand lost both matches by an innings, and he was not selected again.

When the Northern Districts team was formed for the 1956–57 season he joined them and played for them until 1962–63, the season they won their first Plunket Shield. He captained Northern Districts in the 1957–58 season, and took five wickets in their first victory, over Central Districts that season. His best innings and match figures in first-class cricket came in the match against Otago in 1959–60, when he took 7 for 45 and 5 for 64; Otago nevertheless won by 72 runs.

== Later life ==
Lissette was a squadron leader in the Royal New Zealand Air Force. He served in Europe in World War II as a fighter pilot with No. 126 Squadron, Royal Air Force. He was shot down while on operations in a Spitfire over Albania in January 1943 and captured, remaining a prisoner until the end of the war. In the 1966 Queen's Birthday Honours, he was appointed a Member of the Military Division of the Order of the British Empire.

Lissette suffered a heart attack during a club game in October 1972 and died the following January, aged 53.
