= Douglas Gray (cricketer) =

New Zealand cricketer

Personal information
- Born: 22 March 1936; Auckland, New Zealand
- Died: 6 September 2004 (aged 68); Matamata, New Zealand
- Source: Cricinfo, 1 November 2020

Douglas Gray (22 March 1936 – 6 September 2004) was a New Zealand cricketer. He played in sixteen first-class matches for Northern Districts from 1956 to 1960.

== See also ==
- List of Northern Districts representative cricketers
