= Dennis Matthews (cricketer) =

New Zealand cricketer (born 1943)

Personal information
- Full name: Dennis Neal Matthews
- Born: 16 July 1943 (age 83); Paeroa, Waikato, New Zealand
- Batting: Left-handed
- Bowling: Right-arm leg-spin
- Role: Bowler

Domestic team information
- Years: Team
- 1963/64: Northern Districts

Career statistics
Competition	First-class
Matches	6
Runs scored	57
Batting average	11.40
100s/50s	0/0
Top score	19*
Balls bowled	734
Wickets	10
Bowling average	36.70
5 wickets in innings	0
10 wickets in match	0
Best bowling	3/44
Catches/stumpings	0/–
- Source: Cricinfo, 20 May 2024

Dennis Neal Matthews (born 16 July 1943) is a former New Zealand cricketer.

Matthews was born in Paeroa in the Waikato, and played five first-class matches for Northern Districts in the Plunket Shield in the 1963–64 season. He also played for Thames Valley in the Hawke Cup. A leg-spin bowler, he was given a trial in advance of New Zealand's tour of India, Pakistan and England in 1965 but was not selected, and played no more major cricket after the 1964–65 season.
