= Chris Kuggeleijn =

New Zealand cricketer (born 1956)

Personal information
- Full name: Christopher Mary Kuggeleijn
- Born: 10 May 1956 (age 70); Auckland, New Zealand
- Batting: Right-handed
- Bowling: Right-arm off break
- Relatives: Scott Kuggeleijn (son)

International information
- National side: New Zealand
- Test debut (cap 167): 12 November 1988 v India
- Last Test: 2 December 1988 v India
- ODI debut (cap 61): 9 March 1988 v England
- Last ODI: 14 March 1989 v Pakistan

Domestic team information
- Years: Team
- 1975/76–1990/91: Northern Districts

Career statistics
Competition	Test	ODI	FC	LA
Matches	2	16	89	66
Runs scored	7	142	3,747	772
Batting average	1.75	15.77	27.55	15.44
100s/50s	0/0	0/0	4/17	0/0
Top score	7	40	116	41*
Balls bowled	97	817	5,373	1,661
Wickets	1	12	57	46
Bowling average	67.00	50.33	42.73	36.10
5 wickets in innings	0	0	0	0
10 wickets in match	0	0	0	0
Best bowling	1/50	2/31	4/30	3/20
Catches/stumpings	1/–	9/–	73/–	31/–
- Source: Cricinfo, 4 May 2017

Christopher Mary Kuggeleijn (born 10 May 1956) is a retired former New Zealand cricketer. He played two Test matches in 1988–89 and 16 One Day Internationals for New Zealand in 1988 and 1989. He played domestic cricket for Northern Districts and also played for Hamilton in the Hawke Cup.

Kuggeleijn is of Dutch extraction, which accounts for his unusual middle name of Mary. Kuggeleijn's son Scott also plays for New Zealand, as well as Northern Districts in the Plunket Shield.

== International career ==
His biggest contribution came in just the third over of his Test debut at Bangalore, when he took the catch (India's Arun Lal) that gave Richard Hadlee the record number of Test wickets (374) at the time.

== After cricket ==
He later coached Northern Districts and the Hamilton Boys' High School 1st XI which, under his tutelage was national champion twice.
