= Brian Dunning (cricketer) =

New Zealand cricketer

Personal information
- Born: 20 March 1940; Warkworth, New Zealand
- Died: 16 February 2008 (aged 67); Whangārei, New Zealand
- Nickname: Dunno
- Batting: Left-handed
- Bowling: Right-arm medium

Domestic team information
- Years: Team
- 1961/62–1980/81: Northern Districts

Career statistics
Competition	First-class	List A
Matches	83	15
Runs scored	3,929	319
Batting average	28.06	29.00
100s/50s	3/22	0/3
Top score	142	80
Balls bowled	4195	485
Wickets	51	8
Bowling average	35.37	37.75
5 wickets in innings	1	0
10 wickets in match	0	0
Best bowling	5/37	2/26
Catches/stumpings	58/–	6/–
- Source: Cricinfo, 23 April 2017

Brian Dunning (20 March 1940 – 16 February 2008) was a New Zealand cricketer who played first-class and List A cricket for Northern Districts from 1961 to 1981.

== Cricket career ==
Brian Dunning made his first-class debut for Northern Districts in 1961–62 and was seldom out of the team for 17 seasons. He captained them from 1970–71 to 1973–74, and had his best season in 1972–73, when he scored 451 runs at an average of 41.00 and took 10 wickets at 19.10. He also made his highest score in 1972–73, 142 out of a team total of 252 against Central Districts, and took his best bowling figures, 5 for 37 against Auckland.

He represented New Zealand in Australia's Coca-Cola Knockout Cup in 1971–72 and in their winning campaign in 1972–73.

Dunning also played 159 non-first-class matches for Northland, scoring 7164 runs, including 18 centuries, and holding 93 catches – all Northland cricket records – before arthritis forced his retirement at 49. In 1982–83, when Northland won the Hawke Cup for the second time and held it against two challenges, Dunning was the leading batsman in the competition, with 390 runs at 97.50 including two centuries. In January 2011, to mark 100 years of Hawke Cup cricket, a "Team of the Century" was named. Dunning was one of the eleven.

The six associations that make up Northern Districts Cricket compete among themselves annually in one-day cricket for the Brian Dunning Cup.

Dunning and his wife Trudi had four daughters. He collapsed at work in February 2008 and died the next day in hospital, aged 67.
