= Craig Ross (Northern Districts cricketer) =

New Zealand cricketer (born 1970)

Personal information
- Full name: Craig William Ross
- Born: 18 October 1970 (age 56); Papakura, New Zealand
- Batting: Right-handed
- Bowling: Right-arm medium

Domestic team information
- Years: Team
- 1988/89–1996/97: Counties
- 1989/90–1995/96: Northern Districts
- Source: Cricinfo, 1 November 2020

Craig William Ross (born 18 October 1970) is a New Zealand former cricketer. He played in 17 first-class and 10 List A matches for Northern Districts between the 1989–90 season and 1996–97.

Ross was born at Papakura in South Auckland, the son of farmers Garth and Joan Ross. He grew up on the family farm at Karaka and played a variety of sports at school before being selected for Counties age group cricket sides. A right-arm opening bowler, Ross made his senior Counties debut during the 1988–89 season before playing for Northern Districts age group sides and touring Australia and England with New Zealand Young Cricketers during 1989, playing under-19 Test and One Day International matches.

The following season, Ross made his senior representative debut for Northern Districts at the age of 19, opening the bowling against Central Districts and taking seven wickets. He went on to take 42 first-class and 11 List A wickets in his senior career and played for Counties in the Hawke Cup. A back injury forced him to retire from top-level cricket following the 1996–97 season.

Whilst playing Ross had worked as an electrical salesman with his uncle, and following his retirement he continued to be employed in this role. He began coaching age group sides and spent two seasons as a coach with the Northern Districts Cricket Academy before spending a season as the provincial assistant head coach in 2008–09 whilst the team's head coach, Andy Moles, was coaching the New Zealand national side. He was then appointed the provincial high performance development coach and also coached New Zealand pace bowlers before, in 2012, becoming Central Districts first director of cricket. After working in the role for five seasons, Ross moved to become the high performance operations manager at Hawke's Bay in 2017.

Ross is married with three children.
