= Waikato Valley cricket team =

New Zealand cricket team

Personnel
- Owner: Waikato Valley Cricket Association

Team information
- Founded: 2003
- Home ground: Morrinsville Recreation Ground, Morrinsville

History
- Hawke Cup wins: 0 (South Auckland won 3 times, Waikato 3 times)
- Official website: Waikato Valley Cricket

The Waikato Valley cricket team is a New Zealand cricket team run by the Waikato Valley Cricket Association. It is one of the 21 teams from around New Zealand that compete in the Hawke Cup. Waikato Valley's administrative base is at Seddon Park in Hamilton. The team's main home ground is the Morrinsville Recreation Ground, Morrinsville.

The Waikato Valley Cricket Association was formed when the Thames Valley and Midlands associations amalgamated in 2003. It covers the greater Waikato region and extends from Coromandel in the north to Te Kūiti and Mangakino in the south. It represents most of the Waikato region apart from the city of Hamilton, which has its own team in the Hawke Cup.

== History ==
=== South Auckland and Waikato ===
The South Auckland Cricket Association was formed in February 1911, with a view to competing in the Hawke Cup competition, which had just been inaugurated. In 1912–13, their first Hawke Cup season, South Auckland won all three of their matches, including a victory over Marlborough in the final. In 1913–14 a South Auckland XVIII played a two-day match against the touring Australians, which ended in a draw.

During World War I the Association ceded its functions to the Waikato Cricket Association, one of its constituent associations. Waikato competed several times in the Hawke Cup during the 1920s. The South Auckland Cricket Association was reconstituted in 1929, and South Auckland again represented the region in the Hawke Cup. South Auckland won the Hawke Cup in December 1930, when they defeated Rangitikei, and they resisted 11 challenges before losing to Nelson in January 1933. South Auckland won again in February 1938, and held the title at the end of the 1937–38 season after a victory over Wanganui in March.

In November 1938, the South Auckland Cricket Association changed its name to the Waikato Cricket Association. Under their new name, Waikato, they retained the Hawke Cup until they were defeated by Manawatu in January 1940.

In February 1950 Waikato played a two-day match against the touring Australians in which Noel McMahon scored 102 in 157 minutes (with 12 fours and three sixes) out of a Waikato total of 157. The match ended in a draw. Purely on the basis of his form for Waikato, McMahon was selected to play for New Zealand in an unofficial Test against Australia shortly afterwards.

Waikato was one of the constituent associations that made up the Northern Districts team, which began competing at first-class level in the Plunket Shield in the 1956–57 season. Seven Waikato players – James Everest, Doug Gray, Peter Smith, Tom Puna, Eric Petrie, Allen Lissette and David Hoskin – were all members of Northern Districts' inaugural Plunket Shield team in late December 1956. All seven players had been part of the Waikato team that won the Hawke Cup earlier that month by defeating Northland. Waikato held the trophy until the first match in 1958–59. Petrie became Waikato's first Test player in England in 1958.

Lissette and Puna were also members of the next Waikato team to win the Hawke Cup, in February 1969, when they beat Hawke's Bay. They held the trophy till February 1970, when Southland beat them.

Waikato ceased competing after the 1974–75 season. Most of their players continued with Hamilton.

=== Thames Valley, King Country and Midlands ===
The Thames Valley cricket team represented the Thames Valley region, the most northerly part of the Waikato. The Thames Valley Cricket Association was formed in the years after World War II. Thames Valley competed in the Hawke Cup from 1955–56 to 1983–84. They played their home matches at a number of venues, but most often at Herries Park, Te Aroha. They played 38 elimination matches and progressed three times to a challenge match – in January 1957, December 1961 and December 1966.

The King Country cricket team represented the King Country region, which is now divided between the southern part of the Waikato and the north-western part of the Manawatū-Whanganui region. The King Country Cricket Association was formed in January 1928, with its headquarters at Taumarunui. King Country competed in the Hawke Cup from 1955–56 to 1972–73. They played 17 elimination matches, but won none of them. The only time they were scheduled to play a challenge match was against Southland in December 1970 but they had to default, as they were unable to afford the trip to Invercargill. They played most of their home matches at the Taumarunui Domain.

The Midlands cricket team represented the part of the Waikato between Hamilton and the King Country. Midlands competed in the Hawke Cup from 1975–56 to 1983–84. They played their home matches at Albert Park, Te Awamutu. They played 20 elimination matches but never progressed to a challenge match.

=== Waikato Valley ===
The Waikato Valley Cricket Association was formed when the Thames Valley and Midlands associations amalgamated in 2003. They have played one Hawke Cup challenge match, losing on the first innings to Canterbury Country in March 2023.

As well as the Hawke Cup, Waikato Valley also compete in the Fergus Hickey Rosebowl, the competition of two-day matches among the six constituent associations of Northern Districts, and the Brian Dunning Cup, the 50-over competition.

== See also ==
- Hamilton cricket team
