= Hugh Barton (cricketer) =

New Zealand cricketer (born 1939)

Personal information
- Born: 21 November 1939 (age 86); Gisborne, New Zealand
- Source: Cricinfo, 1 November 2020

Hugh Barton (born 21 November 1939) is a New Zealand cricketer. He played in two first-class matches for Northern Districts in 1957/58.
