= Mark Orchard (cricketer) =

New Zealand cricketer (born 1978)

Mark Geoffrey Orchard (born 8 November 1978) is a New Zealand cricketer who played for Northern Districts.

== Biography ==
He was born in Hamilton.

In 2005–06 he and Joseph Yovich added 322 for the sixth wicket against Central Districts in Napier for the sixth wicket record. During this innings he made his career best of 175.
