= Hamilton cricket team =

New Zealand cricket team

Personnel
- Owner: Hamilton Cricket Association

Team information
- Founded: 1975
- Home ground: Galloway Park, Hamilton East

History
- Hawke Cup wins: 5
- Official website: Hamilton Cricket Association

The Hamilton cricket team represents the city of Hamilton in New Zealand. It is one of the 21 New Zealand teams that compete in the Hawke Cup, and the only one that just represents an urban area. Its parent organisation is the Hamilton Cricket Association.

== History ==
When Hamilton township was formed in 1864, cricket was already being played in the Waikato region. Cricket was soon established in the town. The first Hamilton Cricket Association was formed in 1899. After numerous reorganisations of cricket in the region, in 1975 the Hamilton Cricket Association was established in its current form, covering the Hamilton metropolitan area and eligible to compete in the Hawke Cup.

Hamilton began competing in the Hawke Cup in the 1976–77 season. Waikato had represented the area until 1974–75, and for most of the period before World War Two South Auckland had done so. All three teams had Seddon Park in Hamilton as their home ground. Hamilton's home ground since 2000 has been Galloway Park in Hamilton East.

Hamilton first challenged for the Hawke Cup title in February 1978. They won the Cup for the first time when they beat Hawke's Bay in March 2001. They have now held the title five times, most recently between March 2019 and March 2020, when they were captained by Keir Bettley.

Northern Districts, of which Hamilton is one of the constituent associations, began playing in the Plunket Shield in 1956–57. Chris Kuggeleijn, Hamilton's first captain in 1976–77, was one of the new Hamilton team's first Plunket Shield players.

As well as the Hawke Cup, Hamilton also compete in the Fergus Hickey Rosebowl, the competition of two-day matches among the six constituent associations of Northern Districts, and the Brian Dunning Cup, the 50-over competition.

== See also ==
- Waikato Valley cricket team
