= Northland cricket team =

New Zealand cricket team

Personnel
- Coach: Neal Parlane
- Owner: Northland Cricket Association

Team information
- Founded: 1926
- Home ground: Cobham Oval, Whangārei

History
- Hawke Cup wins: 7
- Official website: https://northcricket.co.nz

The Northland cricket team represents the Northland region of New Zealand. It is one of the 21 teams from around New Zealand that compete in the Hawke Cup. It was known as North Auckland until 1947.

== History ==
The first mention of cricket in the history of New Zealand is from Northland: a game on the beach at Paihia, in the Bay of Islands, in December 1832. However, it was not until 1926 that a regional cricket body, the North Auckland Cricket Association, was established. The first match for the Dargaville Shield, contested by clubs within the Association, was played in January 1927, when Mangonui beat Northern Wairoa. North Auckland, captained by W. J. Dunning, played their first representative match when they drew a two-day match with Auckland in Auckland in April 1928.

The Association applied for affiliation with the New Zealand Cricket Council in 1932 in order to be eligible to compete for the Hawke Cup. The NZCC granted North Auckland minor association status in 1936.

Northland (playing as North Auckland) challenged for the Hawke Cup for the first time in April 1939, when they were overwhelmed by Waikato by 341 runs at Seddon Park in Hamilton, although Noel Vipond took five wickets in each Waikato innings. At the time, most pitches in Northland were of concrete covered with matting, and Northland players found it difficult to adapt to turf pitches. There was a push to develop more turf pitches after World War Two. Northland’s first match with a touring international team, against Fiji in February 1948, was held at the Whangarei Boys' High School ground, which had a turf pitch. The match was drawn after Fiji failed by two runs to score the required 61 runs to win in seven overs. The North Auckland Cricket Association was renamed the Northland Cricket Association in 1947.

Northland won the Hawke Cup for the first time in January 1956 when, captained by Ellis Child, they defeated Hutt Valley by 90 runs in Lower Hutt. They successfully defended the title later that season against Southern Hawke's Bay at the High School and against Marlborough (when Len Wyatt scored 74 and 104), but lost to Waikato at the High School in the first match in 1956–57.

Northern Districts, of which Northland is one of the constituent associations, began playing in the Plunket Shield in 1956–57. The first Northland player to represent Northern Districts in the Plunket Shield was Len Wyatt, who played in four matches in 1956–57. When Northern Districts won the Plunket Shield for the first time in 1962–63, Northland's Brian Dunning played in every match.

Northland won the Hawke Cup for a second time in 1982–83. They have held it seven times in all, most recently between March 2003 and February 2004, when they played their home matches at Kensington Park in Whangārei. When Cobham Oval, Northland's home ground, was sold in the early 2000s, the Northland Cricket Association developed a new ground about 300 metres to the south, also called Cobham Oval. It has been in use for domestic first-class and international matches since 2009.

Northland also compete in the Fergus Hickey Rosebowl, the competition of two-day matches among the six constituent associations of Northern Districts, and the Brian Dunning Cup, the 50-over competition.
