= Australia women's cricket team in New Zealand in 1994–95 =

Australian women's cricket team in New Zealand in 1994–95
	New Zealand	Australia
- Dates: 12 February – 3 March 1995
Captains	Sarah Illingworth	Belinda Clark

Test series
- Result: 1-match series drawn 0–0
Most runs	Emily Drumm (223)	Belinda Clark (169)
Most wickets	Catherine Campbell (4)	Karen Rolton (4); Catherine Campbell (4)

The Australia women's national cricket team toured New Zealand in February and March 1995. They played against New Zealand and India in the New Zealand Women's Centenary Tournament, an ODI tri-series, finishing bottom of the group. The matches played against New Zealand in the tri-series were played for the Rose Bowl, which was drawn 1–1. They then played against New Zealand in one Test match, which was drawn.

== Squads ==
New Zealand	Australia	India
Sarah Illingworth (c) (wk); Trudy Anderson; Catherine Campbell; Emily Drumm; Kirsty Flavell; Julie Harris; Debbie Hockley; Katrina Keenan; Penny Kinsella; Sarah McLauchlan; Karen Musson; Clare Nicholson; Justine Russell	Belinda Clark (c); Joanne Broadbent; Avril Fahey; Kim Fazackerley; Jo Garey; Zoe Goss; Sally Griffiths; Lee-Anne Hunter; Lisa Keightley; Olivia Magno; Christina Matthews (wk); Karen Rolton; Stephanie Theodore; Caroline Ward	Purnima Rau (c); Sandhya Agarwal; Pramila Bhatt; Anjum Chopra; Sangita Dabir; Neetu David; Rita Dey (wk); Kalyani Dhokarikar; Laya Francis; Smitha Harikrishna; Anju Jain (wk); Chanderkanta Kaul; Renu Margrate; Rishijae Mudgel; Arati Vaidya

== Tri-Series ==
=== Group stage ===
14 February 1995
Scorecard

New Zealand; 154 (46.5 overs)	v	Australia; 153/9 (50 overs)
Trudy Anderson 82 (112); Karen Rolton 3/34 (9.5 overs)		Zoe Goss 44 (98); Catherine Campbell 2/25 (10 overs)

New Zealand Women won by 1 run
Victoria Park, Whanganui
Umpires: Bryan Malin (NZ) and Robert Pitcairn (NZ)

- New Zealand Women won the toss and elected to bat.
- Points: New Zealand Women 2, Australia Women 0
- Jo Garey, Lisa Keightley, Olivia Magno, Karen Rolton and Stephanie Theodore (Aus) all made their WODI debuts.

16 February 1995
Scorecard

Australia; 166 (50 overs)	v	India; 167/7 (47.5 overs)
Lisa Keightley 42 (82); Sangita Dabir 2/25 (10 overs)		Pramila Bhatt 33* (38); Zoe Goss 3/27 (8.5 overs)

India Women won by 3 wickets
Levin Domain, Levin
Umpires: Bryan Malin (NZ) and Terry Knight (NZ)

- Australia Women won the toss and elected to bat.
- Points: India Women 2, Australia Women 0

20 February 1995
Scorecard

New Zealand; 155/9 (50 overs)	v	Australia; 156/4 (46.2 overs)
Kirsty Flavell 42 (71); Karen Rolton 2/18 (6 overs)		Zoe Goss 60 (91); Julie Harris 1/19 (8 overs)

Australia Women won by 6 wickets
Eden Park, Auckland
Umpires: Peter Wright (NZ) and Steve Dunne (NZ)

- New Zealand Women won the toss and elected to bat.
- Points: Australia Women 2, New Zealand Women 0

22 February 1995
Scorecard

Australia	v	India

Match Abandoned
Smallbone Park, Rotorua

- No toss.
- No play possible due to rain.
- Points: Australia Women 1, India Women 1

== Only WTest ==
28 February – 3 March 1995
Scorecard

New Zealand	v	Australia
323/9d (137 overs); Emily Drumm 161* (270); Joanne Broadbent 3/34 (21 overs)		251/7d (111 overs); Belinda Clark 76 (182); Katrina Keenan 2/51 (20 overs)
192/5d (87 overs); Emily Drumm 62* (136); Karen Rolton 2/26 (22 overs)		149/3 (56 overs); Belinda Clark 93* (186); Catherine Campbell 2/46 (15 overs)

Match drawn
Hagley Oval, Christchurch
Umpires: Robert Pitcairn (NZ) and Tony Hill (NZ)

- Australia Women won the toss and elected to field.
- Avril Fahey, Lisa Keightley, Karen Rolton, Stephanie Theodore, Caroline Ward (Aus), Delwyn Brownlee, Justine Russell (NZ) all made their WODI debuts.

== See also ==
- 1994–95 New Zealand Women's Centenary Tournament
