= India women's cricket team in New Zealand in 1994–95 =

Indian women's cricket team in New Zealand in 1994–95
	New Zealand	India
- Dates: 1 – 25 February 1995
Captains	Sarah Illingworth	Purnima Rau

Test series
- Result: 1-match series drawn 0–0
Most runs	Debbie Hockley (107)	Chanderkanta Kaul (79)
Most wickets	Clare Nicholson (4); Katrina Keenan (4)	Neetu David (4)

One Day International series
- Results: India won the 1-match series 1–0
Most runs	Debbie Hockley (54)	Purnima Rau (60)
Most wickets	Karen Musson (2); Catherine Campbell (2); Julie Harris (2)	Neetu David (2)

The India women's national cricket team toured New Zealand in February 1995. They first played against New Zealand in one Test match and one One Day International, drawing the Test and winning the ODI. They then played against New Zealand and Australia in the New Zealand Women's Centenary Tournament, an ODI tri-series, which they won, beating New Zealand in the final.

== Tour Matches ==
=== 3-day match: New Zealand Emerging Players v India ===
1 – 3 February 1995
Scorecard

India	v	New Zealand Emerging Players
355/8d (121 overs); Sangita Dabir 101* (–); Kelly Brown 5/73 (26 overs)		187 (110.4 overs); Delwyn Brownlee 86 (–); Pramila Bhatt 3/27 (22 overs)
127/5d (50.4 overs); R Chandrakanta 47 (–); Losi Harford 2/19 (9 overs)		61/3 (36 overs); Sarah Helmore 19 (–); Purnima Rau 1/11 (7 overs)

Match drawn
Horton Park, Blenheim
Umpires: Terry Knight (NZ) and Bill Sommer (NZ)

- Toss unknown.

=== 50-over match: New Zealand Emerging Players v India ===
4 February 1995
Scorecard

India; 194/5 (50 overs)	v	New Zealand Emerging Players; 105 (35.5 overs)
Arati Vaidya 55 (–); Justine Fryer 2/32 (10 overs)		Lisa Astle 30 (–); Purnima Rau 5/3 (4.5 overs)

India Women won by 89 runs
Horton Park, Blenheim
Umpires: Terry Knight (NZ) and Bill Sommer (NZ)

- Toss unknown.

== Only WTest ==
7 – 10 February 1995
Scorecard

India	v	New Zealand
310 (144.4 overs); Chanderkanta Kaul 75 (151); Katrina Keenan 3/84 (31 overs)		403/8d (174.5 overs); Debbie Hockley 107 (382); Neetu David 4/51 (30 overs)
134/4 (75 overs); Sandhya Agarwal 36 (188); Clare Nicholson 2/36 (20 overs)

Match drawn
Trafalgar Park, Nelson
Umpires: Billy Bowden (NZ) and Nook Ebert (NZ)

- India Women won the toss and elected to bat.
- Katrina Keenan, Clare Nicholson, Kirsty Bond, Trudy Anderson, Sarah Illingworth (NZ), Laya Francis, Renu Margrate, Chanderkanta Kaul, Anju Jain, Rishijae Mudgel, Arati Vaidya, Sangita Dabir, Purnima Rau and Neetu David (Ind) all made their WTest debuts.

== Only WODI ==
12 February 1995
Scorecard

New Zealand; 176/7 (50 overs)	v	India; 178/8 (48.2 overs)
Debbie Hockley 54 (120); Neetu David 2/26 (10 overs)		Purnima Rau 60 (74); Karen Musson 2/23 (8.2 overs)

India Women won by 2 wickets
Hagley Oval, Christchurch
Umpires: Jeremy Busby (NZ) and Nook Ebert (NZ)

- New Zealand Women won the toss and elected to bat.
- Katrina Keenan, Clare Nicholson, Justine Russell (NZ), Arati Vaidya, Rishijae Mudgel, Renu Margrate, Smitha Harikrishna, Anjum Chopra and Neetu David (Ind) all made their WODI debuts.

== Tri-Series ==
=== Group stage ===
16 February 1995
Scorecard

Australia; 166 (50 overs)	v	India; 167/7 (47.5 overs)
Lisa Keightley 42 (82); Sangita Dabir 2/25 (10 overs)		Pramila Bhatt 33* (38); Zoe Goss 3/27 (8.5 overs)

India Women won by 3 wickets
Levin Domain, Levin
Umpires: Bryan Malin (NZ) and Terry Knight (NZ)

- Australia Women won the toss and elected to bat.
- Points: India Women 2, Australia Women 0

18 February 1995
Scorecard

New Zealand; 180/7 (50 overs)	v	India; 184/6 (44.3 overs)
Debbie Hockley 51 (118); Pramila Bhatt 2/36 (10 overs)		Arati Vaidya 77 (117); Catherine Campbell 2/33 (9 overs)

India Women won by 4 wickets
Basin Reserve, Wellington
Umpires: Jeremy Busby (NZ) and Nook Ebert (NZ)

- New Zealand Women won the toss and elected to bat.
- Points: India Women 2, New Zealand Women 0

22 February 1995
Scorecard

Australia	v	India

Match Abandoned
Smallbone Park, Rotorua

- No toss.
- No play possible due to rain.
- Points: Australia Women 1, India Women 1

23 February 1995
Scorecard

India; 106/9 (32 overs)	v	New Zealand; 107/3 (29.5 overs)
Sandhya Agarwal 36 (80); Sarah McLauchlan 1/8 (2 overs)		Debbie Hockley 56* (75); Sangita Dabir 1/9 (5 overs)

New Zealand Women won by 7 wickets
Seddon Park, Hamilton
Umpires: Adrian Keown (NZ) and Malcolm MacLean (NZ)

- India Women won the toss and elected to bat.
- Points: New Zealand Women 2, India Women 0
- Kalyani Dhokarikar (Ind) made her WODI debut.

=== Final ===
25 February 1995
Scorecard

India; 200 (50 overs)	v	New Zealand; 180/8 (50 overs)
Purnima Rau 48 (51); Catherine Campbell 2/25 (10 overs)		Sarah Illingworth 51 (51); Purnima Rau 3/50 (10 overs)

India Women won by 20 runs
Eden Park, Auckland
Umpires: Billy Bowden (NZ) and Tony Hill (NZ)

- New Zealand Women won the toss and elected to field.

== See also ==
- 1994–95 New Zealand Women's Centenary Tournament
