= 1994–95 New Zealand Women's Centenary Tournament =

- Date: 1–25 February 1995
- Location: New Zealand
- Result: India won the tri-series
Teams
Australia	India	New Zealand
Captains
Belinda Clark	Purnima Rau	Sarah Illingworth
Most runs
Zoe Goss (128)	Arati Vaidya (139)	Kirsty Flavell (156)
Most wickets
Karen Rolton (6)	Purnima Rau (6)	Julie Harris (7)

The 1994–95 New Zealand Women's Centenary Tournament was a Women's One Day International (WODI) cricket tournament that was held in New Zealand in February 1995. It was a tri-nation series between Australia, India and New Zealand. It was part of Australia's and India's tours of New Zealand, and the matches between Australia and New Zealand were played for the Rose Bowl, which was drawn 1–1.

India and New Zealand progressed to the final, winning two group stage matches each. India went on to win the tournament, beating New Zealand by 20 runs in the final.

== Squads ==
New Zealand	Australia	India
Sarah Illingworth (c) (wk); Trudy Anderson; Catherine Campbell; Emily Drumm; Kirsty Flavell; Julie Harris; Debbie Hockley; Katrina Keenan; Penny Kinsella; Sarah McLauchlan; Karen Musson; Clare Nicholson; Justine Russell	Belinda Clark (c); Joanne Broadbent; Kim Fazackerley; Jo Garey; Zoe Goss; Sally Griffiths; Lee-Anne Hunter; Lisa Keightley; Olivia Magno; Christina Matthews (wk); Karen Rolton; Stephanie Theodore	Purnima Rau (c); Sandhya Agarwal; Pramila Bhatt; Anjum Chopra; Sangita Dabir; Neetu David; Rita Dey (wk); Kalyani Dhokarikar; Laya Francis; Smitha Harikrishna; Anju Jain (wk); Chanderkanta Kaul; Renu Margrate; Rishijae Mudgel; Arati Vaidya

== Points table ==
Team	Pld	W	L	T	NR	Pts
India (Q)	4	2	1	0	1	5
New Zealand (Q)	4	2	2	0	0	4
Australia	4	1	2	0	1	3

Source: ESPNcricinfo

== Fixtures ==
=== 1st ODI ===
14 February 1995
Scorecard

New Zealand; 154 (46.5 overs)	v	Australia; 153/9 (50 overs)
Trudy Anderson 82 (112); Karen Rolton 3/34 (9.5 overs)		Zoe Goss 44 (98); Catherine Campbell 2/25 (10 overs)

New Zealand Women won by 1 run
Victoria Park, Whanganui
Umpires: Bryan Malin (NZ) and Robert Pitcairn (NZ)

- New Zealand Women won the toss and elected to bat.
- Points: New Zealand Women 2, Australia Women 0
- Jo Garey, Lisa Keightley, Olivia Magno, Karen Rolton and Stephanie Theodore (Aus) all made their WODI debuts.

=== 2nd ODI ===
16 February 1995
Scorecard

Australia; 166 (50 overs)	v	India; 167/7 (47.5 overs)
Lisa Keightley 42 (82); Sangita Dabir 2/25 (10 overs)		Pramila Bhatt 33* (38); Zoe Goss 3/27 (8.5 overs)

India Women won by 3 wickets
Levin Domain, Levin
Umpires: Bryan Malin (NZ) and Terry Knight (NZ)

- Australia Women won the toss and elected to bat.
- Points: India Women 2, Australia Women 0

=== 3rd ODI ===
18 February 1995
Scorecard

New Zealand; 180/7 (50 overs)	v	India; 184/6 (44.3 overs)
Debbie Hockley 51 (118); Pramila Bhatt 2/36 (10 overs)		Arati Vaidya 77 (117); Catherine Campbell 2/33 (9 overs)

India Women won by 4 wickets
Basin Reserve, Wellington
Umpires: Jeremy Busby (NZ) and Nook Ebert (NZ)

- New Zealand Women won the toss and elected to bat.
- Points: India Women 2, New Zealand Women 0

=== 4th ODI ===
20 February 1995
Scorecard

New Zealand; 155/9 (50 overs)	v	Australia; 156/4 (46.2 overs)
Kirsty Flavell 42 (71); Karen Rolton 2/18 (6 overs)		Zoe Goss 60 (91); Julie Harris 1/19 (8 overs)

Australia Women won by 6 wickets
Eden Park, Auckland
Umpires: Peter Wright (NZ) and Steve Dunne (NZ)

- New Zealand Women won the toss and elected to bat.
- Points: Australia Women 2, New Zealand Women 0

=== 5th ODI ===
22 February 1995
Scorecard

Australia	v	India

Match Abandoned
Smallbone Park, Rotorua

- No toss.
- No play possible due to rain.
- Points: Australia Women 1, India Women 1

=== 6th ODI ===
23 February 1995
Scorecard

India; 106/9 (32 overs)	v	New Zealand; 107/3 (29.5 overs)
Sandhya Agarwal 36 (80); Sarah McLauchlan 1/8 (2 overs)		Debbie Hockley 56* (75); Sangita Dabir 1/9 (5 overs)

New Zealand Women won by 7 wickets
Seddon Park, Hamilton
Umpires: Adrian Keown (NZ) and Malcolm MacLean (NZ)

- India Women won the toss and elected to bat.
- Points: New Zealand Women 2, India Women 0
- Kalyani Dhokarikar (Ind) made her WODI debut.

== Final ==
25 February 1995
Scorecard

India; 200 (50 overs)	v	New Zealand; 180/8 (50 overs)
Purnima Rau 48 (51); Catherine Campbell 2/25 (10 overs)		Sarah Illingworth 51 (51); Purnima Rau 3/50 (10 overs)

India Women won by 20 runs
Eden Park, Auckland
Umpires: Billy Bowden (NZ) and Tony Hill (NZ)

- New Zealand Women won the toss and elected to field.

== See also ==
- Australian women's cricket team in New Zealand in 1994–95
- Indian women's cricket team in New Zealand in 1994–95
