= England women's cricket team in India in 1995–96 =

English women's cricket team in India in 1995–96
	India	England
- Dates: 7 November – 15 December 1995
Captains	Purnima Rau	Karen Smithies

Test series
- Result: England won the 3-match series 1–0
Most runs	Sangita Dabir (194)	Jan Brittin (229)
Most wickets	Sangita Dabir (10); Neetu David (10)	Debra Stock (11)

One Day International series
- Results: India won the 5-match series 3–2
Most runs	Anju Jain (136)	Jan Brittin (145)
Most wickets	Pramila Bhatt (10)	Karen Smithies (8)

The English women's cricket team toured India in November and December 1995. They played India in 5 One Day Internationals and 3 Test matches. India won the ODI series 3–2, whilst England won the Test series 1–0. England's Test win, by 2 runs, is the narrowest winning margin by runs in Women's Test history. In the same Test, Neetu David took the best bowling figures in an innings in Women's Test history, with 8/53.

== Squads ==
India	England
Purnima Rau (c); Sandhya Agarwal; Pramila Bhatt; Anjum Chopra; Sangita Dabir; Neetu David; Laya Francis; Smitha Harikrishna; Anju Jain; Chanderkanta Kaul; Renu Margrate; Rishijae Mudgel; Manju Nadgoda; Lissy Samuel; Shyama Shaw; Arati Vaidya; Rajani Venugopal	Karen Smithies (c); Jan Brittin; Jo Chamberlain; Clare Connor; Barbara Daniels; Kathryn Leng; Debra Maybury; Sue Metcalfe; Helen Plimmer; Sue Redfern; Melissa Reynard; Jane Smit (wk); Debra Stock; Clare Taylor

== Tour Matches ==
=== 45-over match: Indian XI v England ===
7 November 1995
Scorecard

England; 107/8 (45 overs)	v	(India) Indian XI; 70 (31.4 overs)
Jane Smit 45 (104); Preeti Dudhe 2/32 (9 overs)		Shyama Shaw 17 (46); Jo Chamberlain 4/18 (7 overs)

England Women won by 37 runs
Narendra Mohan Sports Stadium, Ghaziabad

- Indian XI Women won the toss and elected to field.

=== 45-over match: Women's Cricket Association of India President's XI v England ===
9 November 1995
Scorecard

Women's Cricket Association of India President's XI; 121/7 (45 overs)	v	England; 125/2 (39.2 overs)
Kalyani Dhokarikar 35 (–); Melissa Reynard 4/23 (8 overs)		Jan Brittin 56* (–); V Matkar 1/10 (4 overs)

England Women won by 8 wickets
Nahar Singh Stadium, Faridabad

- Toss not known.

=== 45-over match: Air India v England ===
8 December 1995
Scorecard

Air India; 155/4 (45 overs)	v	England; 75 (31.4 overs)
Mamatha Maben 40 (–); Debra Stock 2/17 (9 overs)		Clare Connor 19 (–); Rupanjali Shastri 4/8 (9 overs)

Air India Women won by 80 runs
Jamia Millia Islamia University Ground, Delhi

- England Women won the toss and elected to field.

== WODI Series ==
=== 1st ODI ===
11 November 1995
Scorecard

India; 112 (44.5 overs)	v	England; 113/1 (41.2 overs)
Chanderkanta Kaul 22 (55); Melissa Reynard 2/11 (3.5 overs)		Barbara Daniels 40* (81); Neetu David 1/12 (10 overs)

England Women won by 9 wickets
Feroz Shah Kotla, Delhi
Umpires: Des Raj (Ind) and Shyam Bansal (Ind)
Player of the match: Barbara Daniels (Eng)

- England Women won the toss and elected to field.

=== 2nd ODI ===
14 November 1995
Scorecard

India; 85 (32.3 overs)	v	England; 78 (43.5 overs)
Sangita Dabir 15 (31); Jo Chamberlain 4/18 (7.3 overs)		Sue Metcalfe 32 (110); Pramila Bhatt 3/9 (8.5 overs)

India Women won by 7 runs
Nehru Stadium, Guwahati

- England Women won the toss and elected to field.
- Match reduced to 45 overs per side due to rain.

=== 3rd ODI ===
1 December 1995
Scorecard

England; 194/6 (50 overs)	v	India; 153 (46.4 overs)
Jan Brittin 81 (105); Purnima Rau 3/43 (11 overs)		Anju Jain 42 (95); Karen Smithies 3/20 (10 overs)

England Women won by 41 runs
Moin-ul-Haq Stadium, Patna
Umpires: BK Bhaskaran (Ind) and PK Pranyeen (Ind)

- India Women won the toss and elected to field.
- Manju Nadgoda and Shyama Shaw (Ind) both made their WODI debuts.

=== 4th ODI ===
5 December 1995
Scorecard

England; 131/9 (50 overs)	v	India; 133/1 (41.3 overs)
Karen Smithies 36* (83); Pramila Bhatt 4/25 (10 overs)		Anju Jain 65 (116); Clare Taylor 1/23 (10 overs)

India Women won by 9 wickets
K. D. Singh Babu Stadium, Lucknow
Umpires: RP Singh (Ind) and SIR Naqvi (Ind)
Player of the match: Pramila Bhatt (Ind)

- India Women won the toss and elected to field.

=== 5th ODI ===
15 December 1995
Scorecard

England; 146/9 (50 overs)	v	India; 147/3 (44.1 overs)
Karen Smithies 38 (93); Laya Francis 2/19 (10 overs)		Anjum Chopra 53* (124); Karen Smithies 1/15 (10 overs)

India Women won by 7 wickets
M. A. Chidambaram Stadium, Madras
Player of the match: Purnima Rau (Ind)

- India Women won the toss and elected to field.
- Lissy Samuel (Ind) made her WODI debut.

== WTest Series ==
=== 1st Test ===
17 – 20 November 1995
Scorecard

England	v	India
209/5d (94 overs); Jan Brittin 84 (177); Sangita Dabir 3/8 (12 overs)		314/6d (114 overs); Anju Jain 110 (278); Karen Smithies 2/52 (21 overs)
28/2 (20 overs); Jan Brittin 16 (46); Pramila Bhatt 1/1 (3 overs)

Match drawn
Calcutta Cricket and Football Club, Kolkata
Umpires: SB Nandy (Ind) and Subrata Banerjee (Ind)
Player of the match: Anju Jain (Ind)

- India Women won the toss and elected to field.
- Barbara Daniels, Kathryn Leng, Melissa Reynard, Clare Taylor (Eng), Anjum Chopra and Shyama Shaw (Ind) all made their WTest debuts.

=== 2nd Test ===
24 – 27 November 1995
Scorecard

England	v	India
196 (105.3 overs); Jan Brittin 44 (129); Sangita Dabir 4/36 (21 overs)		263 (114 overs); Sangita Dabir 60 (114); Debra Stock 3/44 (27 overs)
194 (126.3 overs); Jane Smit 42* (108); Neetu David 8/53 (31.3 overs)		125 (38.3 overs); Anjum Chopra 31 (48); Debra Stock 4/32 (12 overs)

England Women won by 2 runs
Keenan Stadium, Jamshedpur
Umpires: K Chakravarthy (Ind) and Randhir Biswas (Ind)
Player of the match: Jan Brittin (Eng)

- England Women won the toss and elected to bat.
- Sue Redfern (Eng) made her WTest debut.
- England's victory margin of 2 runs is the narrowest winning margin by runs in Women's Test match history.
- Neetu David's 8/53 in the third innings of the match is the best bowling figures in an innings in Women's Test match history.

=== 3rd Test ===
10 – 13 December 1995
Scorecard

India	v	England
184 (89.4 overs); Shyama Shaw 66 (104); Clare Taylor 4/38 (24 overs)		98 (77.3 overs); Sue Metcalfe 23 (126); Shyama Shaw 3/19 (14 overs)
216/7d (97 overs); Chanderkanta Kaul 67 (175); Karen Smithies 2/36 (18 overs)		182/9 (137 overs); Jan Brittin 68 (256); Purnima Rau 4/51 (54 overs)

Match drawn
Lal Bahadur Shastri Stadium, Hyderabad
Umpires: V. K. Ramaswamy (Ind) and V.S. Rajan (Ind)
Player of the match: Shyama Shaw (Ind)

- England Women won the toss and elected to field.
- Clare Connor (Eng) made her WTest debut.
