= India women's cricket team in England in 1999 =

Indian women's cricket team in England in 1999
	England	India
- Dates: 21 June – 15 July 1999
Captains	Clare Connor	Chanderkanta Kaul

Test series
- Result: 1-match series drawn 0–0
Most runs	Charlotte Edwards (123)	Chanderkanta Kaul (114)
Most wickets	Clare Taylor (4)	Purnima Rau (7)

One Day International series
- Results: India won the 3-match series 2–1
Most runs	Karen Smithies (154)	Anjum Chopra (177)
Most wickets	Clare Connor (8)	Rupanjali Shastri (5)

The India women's national cricket team toured England in June and July 1999. They played three One Day Internationals and one Test match against England, winning the ODI series 2–1 and drawing the Test match. They also played against Ireland in an ODI, which they won by 161 runs.

== Squads ==
England	India
Karen Smithies (c); Sarah Collyer; Clare Connor; Charlotte Edwards; Kathryn Leng; Laura Newton; Lucy Pearson; Sue Redfern; Melissa Reynard; Jane Smit (wk); Claire Taylor; Clare Taylor	Chanderkanta Kaul (c); Anjum Chopra; Neetu David; Kalyani Dhokarikar; Reshma Gandhi; Anju Jain (wk); Hemlata Kala; Deepa Marathe; Renu Margrate; Mithali Raj; Purnima Rau; Rupanjali Shastri; Arati Vaidya

== Tour Matches ==
=== 3-day match: England Under-21s v India ===
21 – 23 June 1999
Scorecard

England Under 21s	v	India
150 (81.2 overs); Sarah Collyer 53 (183); Deepa Marathe 3/27 (17 overs)		267/8d (110 overs); Purnima Rau 61 (–); Sarah Collyer 3/28 (22 overs)
226/9d (100 overs); Charlotte Edwards 69 (156); Purnima Rau 4/71 (28 overs)		18/2 (12 overs); Arati Vaidya 9* (39); Sarah Collyer 1/0 (6 overs)

Match drawn
Campbell Park, Milton Keynes
Umpires: Lorraine Elgar (Eng) and Bob White (Eng)

- England Under-21s Women won the toss and elected to bat.

=== 50-over match: England A v India ===
25 June 1999
Scorecard

India; 233/4 (50 overs)	v	England A 120 (47.3 overs)
Chanderkanta Kaul 73 (112); Katharine Winks 2/33 (10 overs)		Jackie Hawker 56* (71); Neetu David 2/16 (7.3 overs)

India Women won by 113 runs
Campbell Park, Milton Keynes
Umpires: David Bryant (Eng) and Annette Owen (Eng)

- India Women won the toss and elected to bat.

=== 50-over match: North of England v India ===
1 July 1999
Scorecard

North of England; 130/8 (35 overs)	v	India; 131/2 (32 overs)
Ella Donnison 50 (88); Deepa Marathe 3/22 (7 overs)		Anju Jain 59* (95); Laura Spragg 1/27 (7 overs)

India Women won by 8 wickets
Clifton Park Ground, York
Umpires: John Hayes (Eng) and Janet Rogers (Eng)

- North of England Women won the toss and elected to bat.
- Match reduced to 35 overs per side due to rain.

== Only ODI: Ireland v India ==
26 June 1999
Scorecard

India; 258/0 (50 overs)	v	Ireland; 97/9 (50 overs)
Mithali Raj 114* (139)		Clare Shillington 21 (28); Purnima Rau 4/33 (10 overs)

India Women won by 161 runs
Campbell Park, Milton Keynes
Umpires: David Bryant (Eng) and Lorraine Elgar (Eng)

- Ireland Women won the toss and elected to field.
- Reshma Gandhi, Hemlata Kala, Mithali Raj, Rupanjali Shastri (Ind), Isobel Joyce and Lara Molins (Ire) all made their WODI debuts.

== WODI Series ==
=== 1st ODI ===
6 July 1999
Scorecard

England; 128/8 (50 overs)	v	India; 132/9 (49.3 overs)
Clare Connor 16 (41); Rupanjali Shastri 2/22 (8 overs)		Anjum Chopra 52 (110); Clare Taylor 3/12 (9.3 overs)

India Women won by 1 wicket
Old Trafford Cricket Ground, Manchester
Umpires: Ann Roberts (Eng) and Mark Benson (Eng)

- England Women won the toss and elected to bat.

=== 2nd ODI ===
9 July 1999
Scorecard

India; 213/7 (50 overs)	v	England; 127 (43.5 overs)
Anjum Chopra 100 (128); Clare Connor 5/49 (10 overs)		Kathryn Leng 35 (49); Deepa Marathe 2/11 (5.5 overs)

India Women won by 86 runs
County Ground, Northampton
Umpires: Kathy Taylor (Eng) and Vanburn Holder (WI)

- India Women won the toss and elected to bat.
- Clare Connor took a hat-trick.

=== 3rd ODI ===
11 July 1999
Scorecard

India; 220/5 (50 overs)	v	England; 221/7 (50 overs)
Chanderkanta Kaul 58 (95); Clare Connor 3/43 (10 overs)		Karen Smithies 100* (146); Purnima Rau 2/32 (5 overs)

England Women won by 3 wickets
Trent Bridge, Nottingham
Umpires: John Hayes (Eng) and Vanburn Holder (WI)

- India Women won the toss and elected to bat.

== Only Test ==
15 – 18 July 1999
Scorecard

England	v	India
329 (147.2 overs); Charlotte Edwards 108 (249); Rupanjali Shastri 3/54 (34 overs)		201 (84.4 overs); Chanderkanta Kaul 48 (118); Clare Taylor 4/47 (21 overs)
123/9d (78 overs); Karen Smithies 51 (172); Purnima Rau 5/24 (20 overs)		223/8 (83 overs); Chanderkanta Kaul 66 (138); Melissa Reynard 2/39 (11 overs)

Match drawn
Denis Compton Oval, Shenley
Umpires: John Steele (Eng) and John West (Eng)

- England Women won the toss and elected to bat.
- Claire Taylor, Laura Newton (Eng), Kalyani Dhokarikar, Hemlata Kala, Deepa Marathe and Rupanjali Shastri (Ind) all made their WTest debuts.
