= New Zealand women's cricket team in Australia in 1995–96 =

Series of women's cricket matches New Zealand played against Australia

	Australia	New Zealand
- Dates: 1 – 11 February 1996
Captains	Belinda Clark	Sarah Illingworth

Test series
- Result: 1-match series drawn 0–0
Most runs	Lee-Anne Hunter (9)	
Most wickets		Katrina Keenan (1)

One Day International series
- Results: Australia won the 3-match series 2–1
Most runs	Belinda Clark (113)	Debbie Hockley (126)
Most wickets	Jo Garey (6); Joanne Broadbent (6)	Katrina Keenan (6)

The New Zealand women's national cricket team toured Australia in February 1996. They first played against Australia in three One Day Internationals, which were to contest the Rose Bowl, with Australia winning the series 2–1. They then played Australia in a Test match, but the match was abandoned on the third day after just 7.5 overs played, with an exhibition 50-over match played on day four instead.

== Squads ==
Australia	New Zealand
Belinda Clark (c); Joanne Broadbent; Avril Fahey; Kim Fazackerley; Cathryn Fitzpatrick; Jo Garey; Zoe Goss; Lee-Anne Hunter; Lisa Keightley; Olivia Magno; Julia Price (wk); Karen Rolton	Sarah Illingworth (c) (wk); Trudy Anderson; Catherine Campbell; Emily Drumm; Kirsty Flavell; Justine Fryer; Julie Harris; Debbie Hockley; Katrina Keenan; Maia Lewis; Sarah McLauchlan; Karen Musson; Justine Russell

== WODI Series ==
=== 1st ODI ===
1 February 1996
Scorecard

New Zealand; 97/9 (50 overs)	v	Australia; 86 (41.1 overs)
Debbie Hockley 27 (65); Jo Garey 2/12 (6 overs)		Lee-Anne Hunter 22 (54); Katrina Keenan 4/11 (9 overs)

New Zealand Women won by 11 runs
St Peter's College, Adelaide
Umpires: AJ Hunter (Aus) and Dennis Rebbeck (Aus)
Player of the match: Katrina Keenan (NZ)

- New Zealand Women won the toss and elected to bat.
- Julia Price (Aus) made her WODI debut.

=== 2nd ODI ===
3 February 1996
Scorecard

Australia; 164/9 (50 overs)	v	New Zealand; 160/8 (49 overs)
Belinda Clark 59 (92); Emily Drumm 3/22 (8 overs)		Debbie Hockley 49 (118); Jo Garey 2/19 (6 overs)

Australia Women won by 4 runs
Adelaide Oval, Adelaide
Umpires: John Jamieson (Aus) and R Welling (Aus)
Player of the match: Emily Drumm (NZ)

- Australia Women won the toss and elected to bat.
- New Zealand Women were fined 1 over of their batting innings for a slow over rate.
- Emily Drumm (NZ) took a hat-trick.

=== 3rd ODI ===
4 February 1996
Scorecard

New Zealand; 148/9 (50 overs)	v	Australia; 149/3 (45 overs)
Debbie Hockley 50 (114); Joanne Broadbent 3/25 (10 overs)		Lisa Keightley 61* (126); Julie Harris 1/13 (7 overs)

Australia Women won by 7 wickets
Adelaide Oval, Adelaide
Umpires: John Jamieson (Aus) and R Welling (Aus)

- New Zealand Women won the toss and elected to bat.

== WTest Series ==
=== 1st Test ===
8 – 11 February 1996
Scorecard

Australia	v	New Zealand
16/1 (7.5 overs); Lee-Anne Hunter 9* (25); Katrina Keenan 1/7 (4 overs)

Match drawn
Arden Street Oval, Melbourne
Umpires: Dan Bomford (Aus) and Stephen Walpole (Aus)

- Australia Women won the toss and elected to bat.
- No play possible on Day 1 and Day 3 due to rain, with the match abandoned on Day 3 and an exhibition match played on Day 4.
- Jo Garey, Olivia Magno, Julia Price (Aus), Justine Fryer and Karen Musson (NZ) all made their WTest debuts.

== Exhibition Match ==
11 February 1996
Scorecard

Australia; 149/8 (50 overs)	v	New Zealand; 153/8 (50 overs)
Zoe Goss 35 (80); Catherine Campbell 2/11 (10 overs)		Debbie Hockley 44 (128); Jo Garey 3/18 (8 overs)

New Zealand Women won by 2 wickets
Arden Street Oval, Melbourne
Umpires: Dan Bomford (Aus) and Stephen Walpole (Aus)

- Australia Women won the toss and elected to bat.
- Match was played on the originally scheduled Day 4 of the Test match, which was abandoned on Day 3 due to rain.
- Teams used 12 players per side, and the match does not count as an official ODI.
