= List of cricket grounds in New Zealand =

Locations of all stadiums which have hosted men's international cricket match within New Zealand

This is a list of cricket grounds in New Zealand. The list includes all grounds that have been used for Test, One Day International, Twenty20 International, first-class, List A and Twenty20 cricket matches.

== List of cricket grounds ==
Ground	City	First used	Last used	First-class games	List A games	Twenty20 games	Notes
Auckland Domain	Auckland	1877–78	1912–13	33	0	0	No longer used for cricket.
Bledisloe Park	Pukekohe	1976–77	1989–90	2	2	0	
Colin Maiden Park	Auckland	1998–99	2010–11	13	8	10	Hosted the 2009–10 State Shield final. Also hosted matches in the 2002 Under-19 Cricket World Cup.
Cornwall Park	Auckland	1970–71	2000–01	3	0	0	Also hosted Women's Test, Women's ODI and Youth Test matches.
Eden Park No. 2	Auckland	1975–76	2008–09	96	82	13	Hosted three State Championship finals, in 1995–96, 1997–98 and 2004–05. Also hosted Women's ODI, Youth Test, Youth ODI and State League matches.
Eden Park	Auckland	1913–14		233	114	6	Hosted Test, ODI and Twenty20 International games for men's, women's and Youth cricket.
North Harbour Stadium/QBE Stadium	Albany	2002–03	2002–03	1	2	0	Hosted the 2002–03 State Shield final. Also hosted Youth ODI and State League matches.
Victoria Park	Auckland	1908–09	1910–11	3	0	0	No longer used for cricket.
Western Springs Stadium	Auckland	1987–88		0	1	0	
Ashburton Domain	Ashburton	1980–81	1988–89	0	4	0	No longer used for cricket at these levels.
Burnside Park	Christchurch	1991–92		1	0	0	
Hagley Oval	Christchurch	1866–67		34	16	1	Also hosted Women's Test, Women's ODI, Youth Test, Youth ODI and State League matches.
Old Hagley Park	Christchurch	1864–65		1	0	0	First cricket ground in the Hagley Park area in Christchurch
Lancaster Park/Jade Stadium (AMI Stadium)	Christchurch	1882–83	2010–11	334	136	4	Hosted Test, ODI and [wenty20 International games for men's, women's and Youth cricket.
Christ's College	Christchurch	1981–82	1981–82	0	0	0	Hosted Women's ODI.
Village Green	Christchurch	1998–99	2010–11	31	18	14	Also hosted Youth ODI and State League matches.
Bert Sutcliffe Oval (BIL Oval)	Lincoln	1999–2000		8	4	0	Also hosted Women's ODI, Women's Twenty20, Youth Test and Youth ODI matches.
Lincoln Green	Lincoln	1997–98	1998–99	5	0	0	Also hosted Women's ODI and Youth ODI games.
Mandeville Sports Centre	Mandeville North	1990–91		0	1	0	
Dudley Park	Rangiora	1980–81	2002–03	15	7	0	Also hosted Women's ODI, Youth ODI and State League matches.
Rangiora Recreation Ground (MainPower Oval)	Rangiora	2003–04	2010–11	9	8	1	Also hosted Youth ODI and State League matches.
Temuka Oval	Temuka	1977–78		1	0	0	
Aorangi Oval	Timaru	1980–81	2010–11	4	14	2	Also hosted Women's ODI and State League matches.
Knottingley Park	Waimate	1984–85		0	1	0	
Harry Barker Reserve	Gisborne	1974–75	2007–08	25	10	0	
Dannevirke Domain	Dannevirke	1992–93		0	1	0	
Nelson Cricket Ground	Hastings	1913–14	2000–01	3	2	0	
Farndon Park	Clive	1891–92	1896–97	4	0	0	No longer used for cricket.
McLean Park	Napier	1951–52		70	57	3	Hosted Test and ODI cricket matches.
Nelson Park	Napier	1919–20	2010–11	10	0	0	
Napier Recreation Ground	Napier	1884–85	1912–13	20	0	0	No longer used for cricket.
Horton Park	Blenheim	1972–73	2002–03	10	3	0	
Memorial Park	Motueka	1987–88		0	1	0	
Botanical Gardens	Nelson	1883–84		1	0	0	
Saxton Oval (Saxton Field)	Nelson	2009–10	2010–11	0	0	4	Hosted two matches in World Cup 2015. Also hosted a Women's Twenty20 game.
Trafalgar Park	Nelson	1891–92	2008–09	28	12	0	No longer used for cricket.
Victory Square	Nelson	1874–75	1887–88	7	0	0	
Cobham Oval (old)	Whangārei	1966–67	2001–02	11	9	0	Also hosted State League matches.
Cobham Oval (new)	Whangārei	2006–07	2010–11	6	10	1	Also hosted Women's ODI and State League matches.
Centennial Park	Oamaru	1981–82	2010–11	9	14	1	Also hosted Women's ODI and State League matches.
Queenstown Events Centre/John Davies Oval (Davies Park)	Queenstown	2001–02	2010–11	12	11	1	Hosted nine ODIs
Caledonian Ground	Dunedin	1879–80	1904–05	4	0	0	No longer used for cricket.
Carisbrook	Dunedin	1883–84	2007–08	252	46	0	Hosted Test and ODI games for men's, women's and Youth cricket.
Logan Park	Dunedin	1977–78	1981–82	3	3	0	Also hosted Women's ODI and State League matches.
Kensington Oval (The Oval)	Dunedin	1863–64	1877–78	9	0	0	Now called Kensington Oval
Sunnyvale Park	Dunedin	1992–93		1	0	0	
University Oval (Varsity Oval)	Dunedin	1978–79		24	15	13	Hosted Test and ODI cricket for men and women.
Molyneux Park	Alexandra	1978–79	2010–11	28	63	1	Also hosted Youth Test, Youth ODI and State League matches.
Smallbone Park	Rotorua	1968–69	2002–03	17	7	0	Also hosted a Women's ODI match.
Owen Delany Park (OD Park)	Taupō	1978–79	2010–11	6	16	0	Hosted three ODIs.
Seddon Park	Hamilton	1956–57		198	122	81	Hosted Test, ODI and Twenty20 International games for men's, women's and Youth cricket.
Tauranga Domain Inner	Tauranga	1965–66	1990–91	1	4	0	
Tauranga Domain Outer	Tauranga	1978–79	1985–86	6	4	0	
Albert Park	Te Awamutu	1987–88		1	0	0	
Morrinsville Recreational Ground	Morrinsville	1986–87	1988–89	2	0	0	Also hosted a Youth ODI
Bay Oval	Tauranga	2008–09		0	0	7	
Bay Oval no. 2	Tauranga	0	0	0	0	1	Hosted single international Women's Twenty20
Blake Park	Tauranga	1987–88	2001–02	0	26	0	Also hosted State League matches.
Queen's Park	Invercargill	1975–76	2010–11	15	12	4	Also hosted Women's ODI, Women's Twenty20 and State League matches.
Rugby Park	Invercargill	1914–15	1920–21	5	0	0	No longer used for cricket.
Bayly Park	Hāwera	1891–92	1897–98	1	0	0	
Pukekura Park	New Plymouth	1950–51	2010–11	53	55	13	Hosted an ODI in the 1992 World Cup between Sri Lanka and Zimbabwe.
Yarrow Stadium	New Plymouth	1998–99	2002–03	0	3	0	
Levin Domain/Courtesy Domain	Levin	1984–85	1995–96	3	8	0	Also hosted Women's ODI matches.
Hutt Recreation Ground	Lower Hutt	1971–72	1985–86	14	1	0	Also hosted Women's ODI matches.
Petone Recreation Ground	Lower Hutt	1991–92	2001–02	2	9	0	Also hosted State League matches.
Queen Elizabeth Park	Masterton	1966–67	2004–05	12	5	0	Also hosted State League matches.
Fitzherbert Park	Palmerston North	1950–51	2010–11	51	23	1	Also hosted Women's ODI, Women's Twenty20 and State League matches.
Maidstone Park	Upper Hutt	1978–79	1979–80	1	1	0	
Waikanae Park	Waikanae	1993–94	2004–05	6	0	0	Also hosted State League matches.
Cooks Gardens	Whanganui	1955–56	1989–90	17	8	0	Also hosted Women's Test and Women's ODI matches.
Victoria Park	Whanganui	1990–91	2002–03	11	3	0	Also hosted Women's ODI and State League matches.
Basin Reserve (the Basin)	Wellington	1973–74		406	176	20	Hosted Test and ODI games for men's, women's and Youth cricket.
Wellington College Ground	Wellington	1923–24		1	0	0	
Westpac Stadium/Sky Stadium/Wellington Regional Stadium	Wellington	1999–2000		24	3	0	Hosted ODIs and Twenty20 Internationals.

- "First used" and "last used" refer to the season in which the ground hosted its first and last game. If only one game was played at the ground, only the first used date is given.

== See also ==
- List of Test cricket grounds – Full international list
- List of stadiums in New Zealand
- List of Australian rugby union stadiums by capacity
- List of Australian rugby league stadiums by capacity
- List of Australian association football stadiums by capacity
