= List of international women's cricket grounds in New Zealand =

Locations of all grounds that currently host women's international cricket matches within New Zealand (excluding grounds on Lloyd Elsmore Park)

This is a list of international women's cricket grounds in New Zealand, including all venues that have hosted at least one Women's Test, Women's One Day International, or Women's Twenty20 International. As of December 2024, 37 venues have hosted women's international matches.

The White Ferns played their first WTest against England at Lancaster Park in February 1935. They played their first WODI and WT20I away from home, in June 1973 and August 2004 respectively. Their first home WODI came nine years later during the 1982 Women's Cricket World Cup, against England at Cornwall Park. Their first home WT20I was played against Australia at Sky Stadium in February 2010.

Because New Zealand had not hosted WODIs until 1982, 12 grounds hosted their first match in any format during the 1982 Women's Cricket World Cup. The same occurred for a further six grounds during the 2000 Women's Cricket World Cup, and for a further three (all in Lloyd Elsmore Park) during the 2024 Women's T20I Pacific Cup. Many of these grounds have not hosted any women's international matches since those events.

== Women's international grounds ==
Below are complete lists of grounds used for women's international cricket in New Zealand, listed in order of first use (regardless of format). The dates given for Tests are that of the first day of the match. All matches are between New Zealand and the team named, unless otherwise specified. Correct up to the end of the 2025/26 season.

=== Active venues ===
Name	Location	First	Last	No.	First	Last	No.	First	Last	No.	Notes
Name	Location	Women's Test			Women's ODI			Women's T20I			Notes
Basin Reserve	Wellington	20 Mar 1948 vs Australia	26 Jan 1990 vs Australia	4	23 Jan 1982 Australia vs England	4 Apr 2026 vs South Africa	29	28 Feb 2016 vs Australia	29 Mar 2024 vs England	6	
Eden Park	Auckland	26 Mar 1949 vs England	27 Dec 1957 vs England	2	20 Jan 1988 vs Australia	20 Mar 2022 vs England	8	22 Feb 2012 vs England	20 Mar 2026 vs South Africa	5	
Hagley Oval	Christchurch	7 Mar 1969 vs England	28 Feb 1995 vs Australia	3	23 Jan 1992 vs Australia	29 Mar 2026 vs South Africa	17	15 Nov 2015 vs Sri Lanka	25 Mar 2026 vs South Africa	5	
Seddon Park	Hamilton	-	-	0	14 Jan 1982 England vs Int'l XI	7 Apr 2024 vs England	20	19 Feb 2012 vs England	17 Mar 2026 vs South Africa	9	
McLean Park	Napier	-	-	0	17 Jan 1982 India vs Int'l XI	4 Mar 2025 vs Sri Lanka	6	30 Mar 2021 vs Australia		1	
Hnry Stadium	Wellington	-	-	0	15 Feb 2000 vs England		1	26 Feb 2010 vs Australia	22 Mar 2026 vs South Africa	8	
John Davies Oval	Queenstown	-	-	0	3 Mar 2010 vs Australia	12 Dec 2023 vs Pakistan	7	9 Feb 2022 vs India	9 Dec 2023 vs Pakistan	3	
Saxton Oval	Nelson	-	-	0	17 Nov 2016 vs Pakistan	9 Mar 2025 vs Sri Lanka	2	30 Dec 2010 vs Australia	24 Mar 2024 vs England	6	
Bay Oval	Tauranga	-	-	0	11 Feb 2015 vs England	18 Mar 2022 Bangladesh vs West Indies	19	8 Mar 2014 vs West Indies	15 Mar 2026 vs South Africa	6	
University Oval	Dunedin	-	-	0	26 Feb 2021 vs England	11 Mar 2026 vs Zimbabwe	8	4 Dec 2022 vs Bangladesh	18 Mar 2025 vs Sri Lanka	6	
Lloyd Elsmore Park	Auckland	-	-	0	-	-	0	17 Jan 2024 Cook Islands vs Fiji	19 Jan 2024 Papua New Guinea vs Vanuatu	4	Hosted the 2024 Women's T20I Pacific Cup.
Lloyd Elsmore Park No 2	Auckland	-	-	0	-	-	0	17 Jan 2024 Cook Islands vs Samoa	21 Jan 2024 Samoa vs Vanuatu	4	Hosted the 2024 Women's T20I Pacific Cup.
Lloyd Elsmore Park No 3	Auckland	-	-	0	-	-	0	17 Jan 2024 Fiji vs Vanuatu	21 Jan 2024 Cook Islands vs Fiji	4	Hosted the 2024 Women's T20I Pacific Cup.

=== Former venues ===
The following grounds have not been used in at least the past three seasons. Unless otherwise stated, these grounds could theoretically host women's international cricket again.

Name	Location	First	Last	No.	First	Last	No.	First	Last	No.	Notes
Name	Location	Women's Test			Women's ODI			Women's T20l			Notes
Lancaster Park	Christchurch	16 Feb 1935 vs England	29 Nov 1957 vs England	2	7 Feb 1982 Australia vs England	15 Feb 1999 vs South Africa	7	28 Feb 2010 vs Australia		1	Demolished following the 2011 Christchurch earthquake.
Carisbrook	Dunedin	17 Mar 1961 vs Australia	8 Jan 1977 vs India	2	13 Feb 1999 vs South Africa		1	-	-	0	Closed in 2011.
Cornwall Park	Auckland	28 Mar 1969 vs England	11 Jan 1992 vs England	3	10 Jan 1982 vs England	14 Jan 1982 vs India	3	-	-	0	
Eden Park Outer Oval	Auckland	-	-	0	10 Jan 1982 Australia vs India	27 Jan 2020 vs South Africa	6	-	-	0	
Pukekura Park	New Plymouth	12 Feb 1992 vs England		1	16 Jan 1992 vs Australia	18 Jan 1982 vs England	3	4 Mar 2016 vs Australia	20 Mar 2018 vs West Indies	2	
Cook's Gardens	Whanganui	6 Feb 1992 vs England		1	20 Jan 1982 England vs India		1	-	-	0	No longer hosts cricket.
Fitzherbert Park	Palmerston North	-	-	0	20 Jan 1982 Australia vs Int'l XI	12 Feb 2000 vs England	6	-	-	0	
Hutt Recreation Ground	Lower Hutt	-	-	0	28 Jan 1982 India vs Int'l XI	11 Feb 1990 vs Australia	4	-	-	0	
Logan Park	Dunedin	-	-	0	30 Jan 1982 Australia vs Int'l XI	31 Jan 1982 vs Int'l XI	2	-	-	0	
Trafalgar Park	Nelson	7 Feb 1995 vs India		1	31 Jan 1982 England vs India		1	-	-	0	No longer hosts cricket.
Christ's College	Christchurch	-	-	0	2 Feb 1982 Australia vs England	4 Feb 1982 England vs Int'l XI	2	-	-	0	
University of Canterbury Grounds	Christchurch	-	-	0	2 Feb 1982 vs India	6 Feb 1982 India vs Int'l XI	3	-	-	0	
Dudley Park	Rangiora	-	-	0	6 Feb 1982 vs Australia	22 Feb 1992 Australia vs England	2	-	-	0	
Levin Domain	Levin	-	-	0	20 Jan 1994 vs Australia	16 Feb 1995 Australia vs India	2	-	-	0	(Note: Incorrectly listed on the New Zealand Cricket archive as having occurred on Weraroa Domain, Levin.)
Victoria Park	Whanganui	-	-	0	4 Feb 1995 vs Australia		1	-	-	0	
Smallbone Park	Rotorua	-	-	0	22 Feb 1995 Australia vs India		0 (Note: Smallbone Park was scheduled to host one WODI in 1995, but the match was abandoned.)	-	-	0	
Whitestone Contracting Stadium	Oamaru	-	-	0	19 Nov 2000 vs England		1	-	-	0	
Aorangi Oval	Timaru	-	-	0	21 Nov 2000 vs England	22 Nov 2000 vs England	2	-	-	0	
Bert Sutcliffe Oval	Lincoln	-	-	0	29 Nov 2000 vs Australia	8 Mar 2018 vs West Indies	58	6 Mar 2008 vs Australia	24 Feb 2015 vs England	2	
Lincoln Green	Lincoln	-	-	0	2 Dec 2000 India vs Netherlands	16 Dec 2000 Australia vs Netherlands	9	-	-	0	
Hagley Park No 2	Christchurch	-	-	0	3 Dec 2000 Australia vs Ireland	16 Dec 2000 Ireland vs South Africa	7	-	-	0	
Lincoln No 3	Lincoln	-	-	0	30 Jan 2003 vs England	6 Feb 2003 England vs India	4	-	-	0	
Cobham Oval (New)	Whangarei	-	-	0	1 Feb 2009 vs Australia	3 Feb 2009 vs Australia	2	19 Feb 2015 vs England	20 Feb 2015 vs England	2	
Queen's Park	Invercargill	-	-	0	6 Mar 2010 vs Australia	7 Mar 2010 vs Australia	2	18 Feb 2011 vs Australia	5 Mar 2014 vs West Indies	7	
Bay Oval No 2	Tauranga	-	-	0	-	-	0	9 Mar 2014 vs West Indies		1	
