= 1996–97 Women's National Cricket League season =

Cricket tournament

Women's National Cricket League 1996–97 season
- Dates: 16 November 1996 – 5 January 1997
- Administrator: Cricket Australia
- Cricket format: Limited overs cricket (50 overs)
- Tournament format(s): Group stage and finals series
- Champions: New South Wales (1st title)
- Runners-up: Victoria
- Participants: 5
- Matches: 23
- Player of the series: (Victoria (state)) Zoe Goss
- Most runs: (Victoria (state)) Zoe Goss (629)
- Most wickets: (New South Wales) Jo Garey (15)
- Official website: cricket.com.au

The 1996–97 Women's National Cricket League season was the first season of the Women's National Cricket League, the women's domestic limited overs cricket competition in Australia. The tournament started on 16 November 1996 and finished on 5 January 1997. Five teams took part with New South Wales Breakers taking the trophy after defeating ladder-toppers Victorian Spirit by three games to zero in the finals series.

== Ladder ==
As of 29 December 1996

Pos	Team	Pld	W	L	T	NR	Pts	NRR
1	Victoria	8	7	0	0	1	45	0.496
2	New South Wales	8	5	3	0	0	30	0.713
3	South Australia	8	3	3	0	2	24	−0.103
4	Western Australia	8	2	6	0	0	12	−0.587
5	Queensland	8	0	5	0	3	9	−0.746

Updated to match(es) played on 29 December 1996. Source:
Rules for classification: The top two ranked teams qualified for the finals series.
- Points system: 6 for a win, 3 each for a tie, no result or abandonment, 0 for a loss.

== Fixtures ==
=== 1st final ===
3 January 1997
Scorecard

Victoria; 7/211 (50 overs)	v	New South Wales; 4/129 (48.3 overs)
Mel Jones 71 (76); Sue Marsh 2/30 (8 overs)		Sally Griffiths 63 (81); Cathryn Fitzpatrick 2/37 (9.3 overs)

New South Wales won by 3 wickets
Sydney Cricket Ground
Umpires: Tony Morgan and Ian Thomas

- Victoria won the toss and elected to bat.

=== 2nd final ===
4 January 1997
Scorecard

Victoria; 8/161 (50 overs)	v	New South Wales; 5/163 (48 overs)
Zoe Goss 50 (105); Belinda Clark 2/16 (4 overs)		Michelle Goszko 64 (101); Cathryn Fitzpatrick 2/39 (10 overs)

New South Wales won by 5 wickets
Sydney Cricket Ground
Umpires: Ken Duffy and Ian Thomas

- Victoria won the toss and elected to bat.

=== 3rd final ===
5 January 1997
Scorecard

Victoria; 7/208 (50 overs)	v	New South Wales; 7/218 (48.4 overs)
Zoe Goss 73 (95); Jo Garey 2/25 (9 overs)		Sally Griffiths 95 (126); Zoe Goss 1/23 (6 overs)

New South Wales won by 7 wickets
Sydney Cricket Ground
Umpires: Ken Duffy and Tony Morgan

- Victoria won the toss and elected to bat.
- New South Wales won the 1996–97 Women's National Cricket League.

== Statistics ==
=== Most runs ===
Player	Team	Mat	Inns	NO	Runs	HS	Ave	BF	SR	100	50
Zoe Goss	Victoria	11	11	2	629	123*	69.88	964	65.24	1	7
Lisa Keightley	New South Wales	11	11	3	467	144*	58.37	695	67.19	2	1
Belinda Clark	New South Wales	11	11	2	431	86	47.88	548	78.64	0	5
Angele Gray	Western Australia	8	8	1	321	86	45.85	540	59.44	0	4
Mel Jones	Victoria	11	10	1	302	71	33.55	456	66.22	0	2

=== Most wickets ===
Player	Team	Mat	Overs	Mdns	Runs	Wkts	BBI	Ave	SR	4WI
Jo Garey	Victoria	11	83.0	16	280	15	4/13	18.66	33.2	1
Charmaine Mason	New South Wales	11	93.1	12	288	14	4/32	20.57	39.9	1
Bronwyn Calver	New South Wales	11	101.3	22	307	12	2/4	25.58	50.7	0
Olivia Magno	Western Australia	8	109.0	15	323	12	3/26	26.91	54.5	0
Cathryn Fitzpatrick	Western Australia	6	100.3	10	378	12	2/11	31.50	50.2	0
