= 2005 Women's Cricket World Cup final =

Cricket match

2005 Women's Cricket World Cup Final
- Event: 2005 Women's Cricket World Cup
Australia	India
(Australia)	(India)
215/4	117
50 overs	46 overs
- Australia won by 98 runs
- Date: 10 April 2005
- Venue: SuperSport Park, Centurion
- Player of the match: Karen Rolton (Aus)
- Umpires: Shaun George (SA) and Zed Ndamane (SA)

The 2005 Women's Cricket World Cup Final was a women's One Day International cricket match between Australia and India played on 10 April 2005 at the SuperSport Park in South Africa. It was the culmination of the 2005 Women's Cricket World Cup, the eighth tournament of the series. Australia (runners-up in the previous World Cup) won by 98 runs, clinching their fifth World Cup title, and their fourth on foreign soil. It was the first time that the Indian team had reached the final of a women's World Cup.

Australia won the toss, and their captain Belinda Clark opted to bat first. Her side scored 215 runs for the loss of 4 wickets (215/4) in their 50 overs. Their top scorer was Australian vice-captain Karen Rolton, who scored 107 runs batting at number three. Indian bowler Amita Sharma took two wickets for 39 runs (2/39). In their response, India failed to build a good opening partnership, as opener Jaya Sharma was dismissed for only 5 runs. India continued to score poorly and losing wickets regularly, and the last of their ten wickets fell at the end of their 46th over. Australia bowlers Shelley Nitschke and Cathryn Fitzpatrick each took two wickets. Rolton was named player of the match.

== Route to the final ==
=== Group stage ===
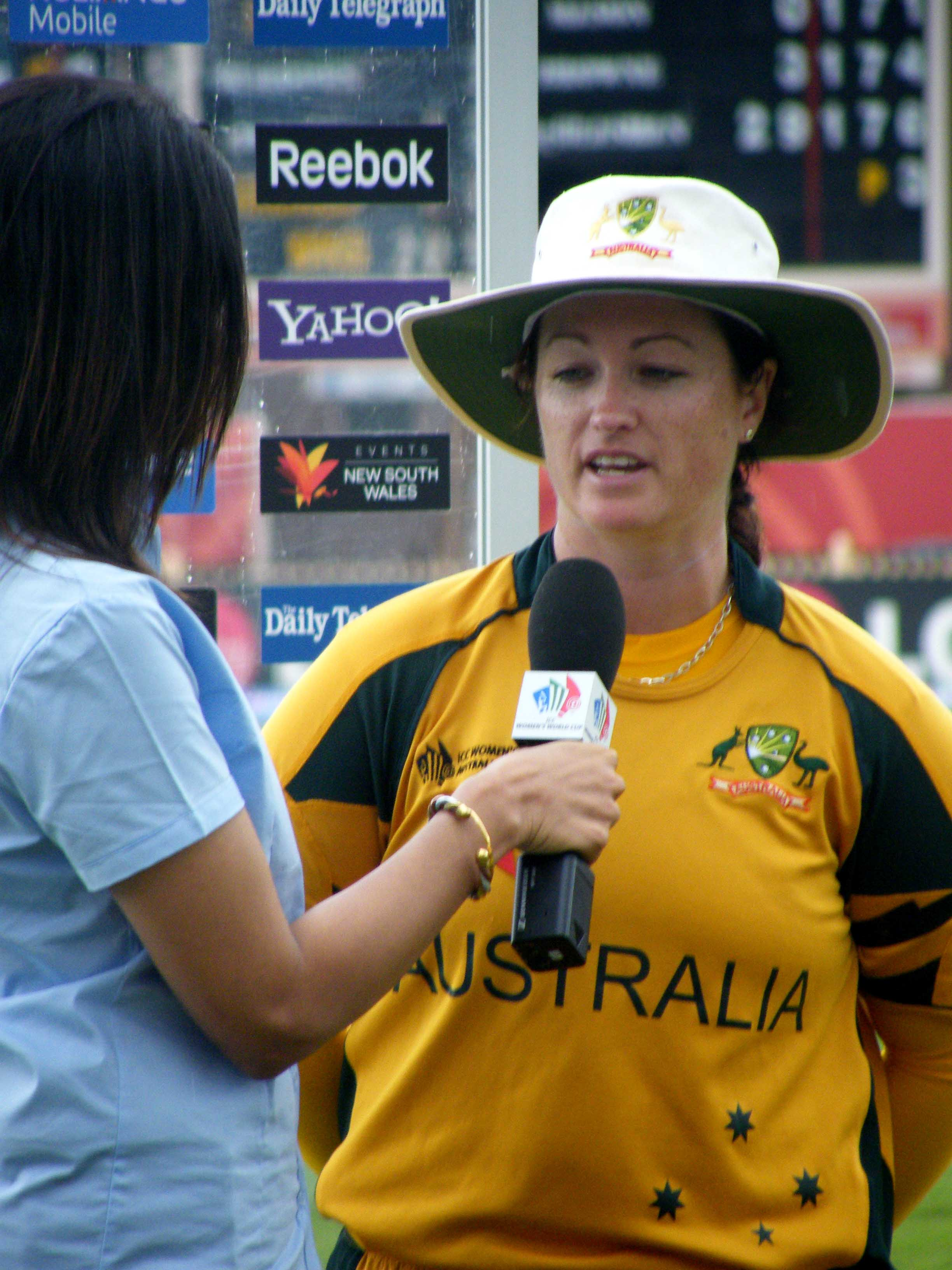
Australia's Karen Rolton was named the player of the tournament.

The 2005 Women's World Cup was a round-robin tournament, in which each of the eight teams played all seven others and the top four progressed to the semifinals.

All of Australia' group stage matches were scheduled at Tshwane University of Technology Oval, Pretoria, except the one against West Indies. Their first match was against England, which "washed out after heavy rain lashed Pretoria". Then, Australia has five consecutive victories, against New Zealand, West Indies, South Africa, Sri Lanka and Ireland by 32 runs, 79 runs, 97 runs, eight wickets and ten wickets respectively.

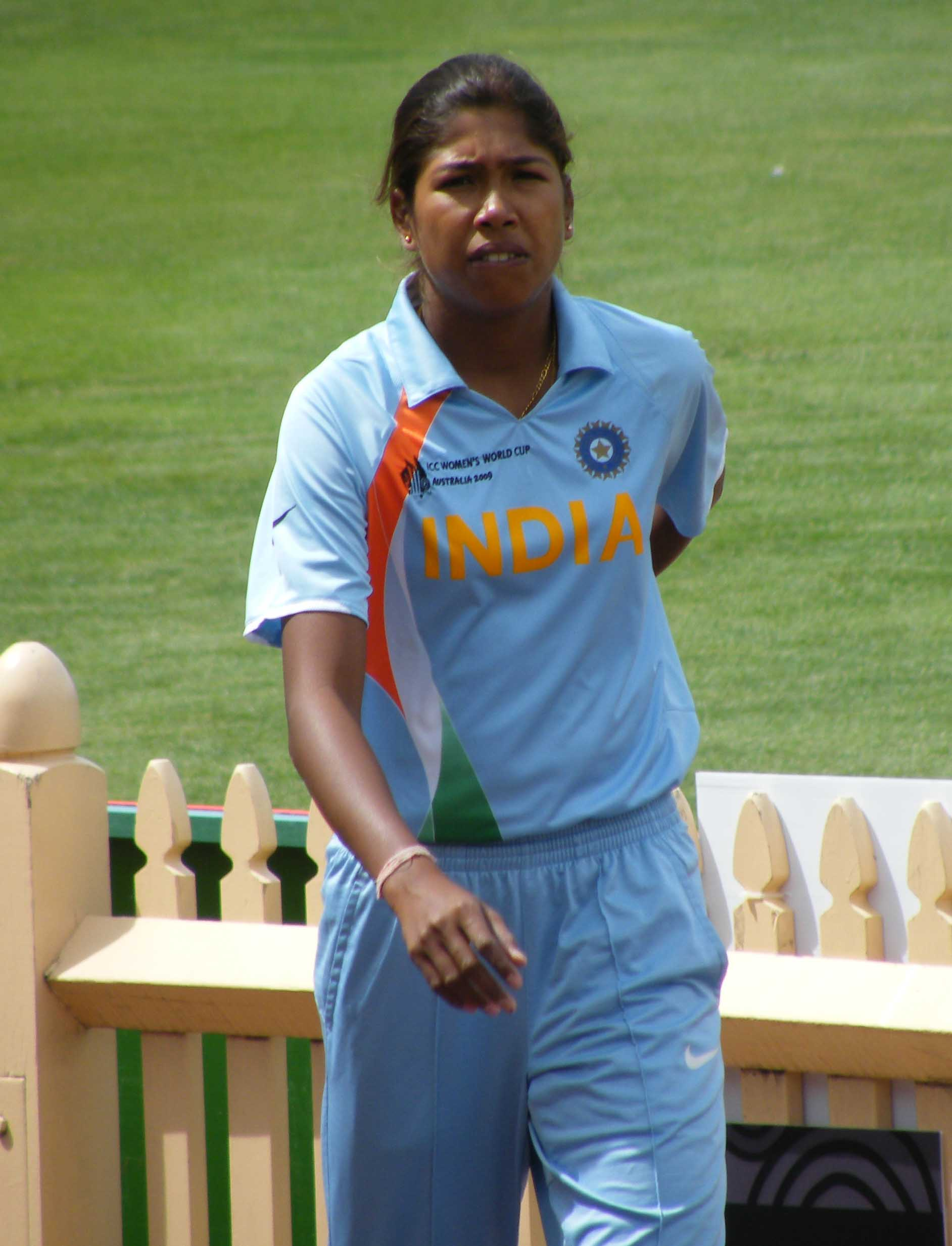
India's Jhulan Goswami took the third highest number of wickets in the tournament, behind her teammates Neetu David and Amita Sharma.

India' group stage matches were also scheduled at Pretoria, except the one against New Zealand. Their first match was against Sri Lanka, which ended with no result. It won its next three matches, against Ireland, South Africa and England by nine wickets, four wicket and seven wickets respectively. It then faced it first loss in the tournament, facing a 16-runs loss from New Zealand.

Both the finalists faced each other in the last match of their group stage, but it was abandoned without a ball being bowled.

=== Semifinals ===
Australia played England in the first semifinal of the tournament. Australia won the toss and put England to bat. England finished on 158, with Fitzpatrick taking three wicket for 27 runs. Clark's tally of 62 runs and Sthalekar's 29 runs helped Australia to reach the required 159 in 47 overs to progress to the final. Clarke was named player of the match.

In the second semifinal India played New Zealand, which won the toss and elected to field first. The Indian openers were quickly dismissed, but Chopra scored 44 and Raj 91 not out, helping India to reach a total of 204 runs. New Zealand finished on 164, and Amita Sharma finished with three wicket for 24 runs. India won by 40 runs and progressed to the final, with Raj being the player of the match.

== Buildup ==
Before the tournament, Jenny Thompson of ESPNcricinfo identified Australia, India, England and New Zealand as the most likely winners. Australia were runners-up in the previous tournament in 2000. This was the first time that India had reached the final of a women's World Cup, but the seventh for Australia, and their sixth on foreign soil. Australia was the only team still unbeaten in the tournament. The one change in the Australian team was the inclusion of Clea Smith in place of Emma Liddell. India fielded the same side as in their semifinal win over New Zealand.

== Match ==
=== Summary ===
Batting conditions were good, and Australia's captain Belinda Clark chose to bat first after winning the toss. The Indian bowlers started well: Clark was caught at wicket by wicket keeper Anju Jain, and in the 11th over, Keightley was caught at second slip by Dhar at second slip. Rolton batted at number three and Jones at number four, taking Australia to 50 runs in the 19th over during their 40-run third-wicket partnership. Jones was dismissed in the 25th over by David and Sthalekar came in, scoring 55 in a 139-run fourth-wicket stand with Rolton, during which Australia reached 100 runs in the 34th over. Sthalekar was caught and bowled by Dhar in the last over, after which Blackwell made 4 runs in 2 balls, giving Australia a total of 215 runs. Rolton remained not out, making 107 runs after she was dropped by Amita Sharma on 60. Goswami, Amita Sharma, Dhar and David each took one wicket for India.

India played a poor innings, losing their first wicket in the 8th over, as Jaya Sharma got run out by Sthalekar and Price. Jain, who made 29 runs, got caught by Sthalekar with an easy catch at mid-wicket. Chopra run out by Julie Hayes on ten runs. Then skipper Raj got leg before wicket by Nitschke, playing across the line. Dhar and Kala were run out in consecutive overs, at 6 and 3 runs respectively. Later Amita Sharma and Goswami made 22 and 18 runs respectively. Amita Sharma got leg before wicket by Sthalekar, and Goswami was caught by substitute Kate Blackwell on backward point. David and Khadeer made ducks. Only four Indian players scored double figures, and the team wa all out for 117 runs in 46 overs. Australia's most successful bowler was Nitschke, who took two wickets for 14 runs.

Rolton was named player of the match and player of the series.

=== Match details ===
On-field umpires	Shaun George (SA) and Zed Ndamane (SA)
Third umpire	Walter Liebisch (SA)
Match referee	Cyril Mitchley (SA)
Toss	Australia elected to bat first

10 April 2005
(scorecard)

Australia; 215/4 (50 overs)	v	India; 117 (46 overs)
Karen Rolton 107* (128); Rumeli Dhar 1/34 (6.0 overs)		Anju Jain 29 (52); Shelley Nitschke 2/14 (9.0)

Australia won by 98 runs
SuperSport Park, Centurion
Player of the match: Karen Rolton (Aus)

=== Scorecard ===
Australia batting innings
Batsman	Method of dismissal	Runs	Balls	Strike rate
Belinda Clark *	c Jain b A Sharma	19	33	57.57
Lisa Keightley	c Dhar b Goswami	5	19	26.31
Karen Rolton	not out	107	128	83.59
Mel Jones	lbw b David	17	47	36.17
Lisa Sthalekar	c & b Dhar	55	75	73.33
Alex Blackwell	not out	4	2	200.00
Cathryn Fitzpatrick	did not bat	–	–	–
Julia Price †	did not bat	–	–	–
Julie Hayes	did not bat	–	–	–
Shelley Nitschke	did not bat	–	–	–
Clea Smith	did not bat	–	–	–
Extras	(2 leg byes, 2 wides, 4 no-balls)	8		
Totals	(50 overs)	215/4		

India bowling
Bowler	Overs	Maidens	Runs	Wickets	Economy
Jhulan Goswami	9	2	45	1	5.00
Amita Sharma	10	2	39	1	3.90
Rumeli Dhar	6	0	34	1	5.66
Nooshin Al Khadeer	10	1	35	1	3.50
Neetu David	10	1	39	1	3.90
Deepa Marathe	5	0	21	0	4.20

India batting innings
Batsman	Method of dismissal	Runs	Balls	Strike rate
Anju Jain †	c Sthalekar b Smith	29	52	55.76
Jaya Sharma	run out	5	26	19.23
Anjum Chopra	run out	10	31	32.25
Mithali Raj *	lbw b Nitschke	6	14	42.85
Rumeli Dhar	run out	6	12	50.00
Hemlata Kala	run out	3	13	23.07
Amita Sharma	lbw b Sthalekar	22	51	43.13
Jhulan Goswami	c sub (Kate Blackwell) b Fitzpatrick	18	38	47.36
Deepa Marathe	not out	7	25	28.00
Neetu David	b Fitzpatrick	0	7	0.00
Nooshin Al Khadeer	b Nitschke	0	8	0.00
Extras	(2 byes, 3 leg byes, 5 wides, 1 no-balls)	11		
Totals	(46 overs)	117		

Australia bowling
Bowler	Overs	Maidens	Runs	Wickets	Economy
Cathryn Fitzpatrick	8	1	23	2	2.87
Clea Smith	10	5	20	1	2.00
Julie Hayes	10	1	28	0	2.80
Shelley Nitschke	9	14	35	2	1.55
Karen Rolton	5	1	9	0	1.80
Lisa Sthalekar	4	1	18	1	4.50

Key

- * – Captain
- † – Wicket-keeper
- c Fielder – the batsman was dismissed by a catch by the named fielder
- b Bowler – the bowler who gains credit for the dismissal
- lbw – the batsman was dismissed leg before wicket
- sub – substitute

== Reaction ==
Both teams received enthusiastic welcomes on their return home, but neither the Australian nor the Indian press paid much attention to the match. The Indian side received 10,000 South African rand for being the runners-up.
