= Jenny Olson =

New Zealand cricketer (born 1945)

Personal information
- Full name: Jennifer Betty Olson
- Born: 28 January 1945 (age 81); Christchurch, New Zealand
- Batting: Right-handed
- Bowling: Right-arm medium
- Role: Bowler

International information
- National side: New Zealand (1969–1973)
- Only Test (cap 57): 7 March 1969 v England
- ODI debut (cap 7): 23 June 1973 v Trinidad & Tobago
- Last ODI: 14 July 1973 v England

Domestic team information
- Years: Team
- 1961/62–1981/82: Canterbury
- 1983/84–1987/88: Southern Districts

Career statistics
Competition	WTest	WODI	WFC	WLA
Matches	1	4	74	17
Runs scored	0	17	2,083	172
Batting average	0.00	5.66	21.25	10.75
100s/50s	0/0	0/0	0/7	0/0
Top score	0	9*	91	29
Balls bowled	114	162	6,913	178
Wickets	0	4	140	4
Bowling average	–	13.00	13.36	15.00
5 wickets in innings	0	0	8	0
10 wickets in match	0	0	1	0
Best bowling	–	3/16	7/18	3/16
Catches/stumpings	0/–	0/–	27/–	2/–
- Source: CricketArchive, 14 November 2021

Jennifer Betty Olson (née Lowe; born 28 January 1945) is a New Zealand former cricketer who played primarily as a right-arm medium bowler. She appeared in one Test match in 1969 and four One Day Internationals in 1973 for New Zealand. She played domestic cricket for Canterbury and Southern Districts.
