= Jennifer Turner =

Jennifer Turner may refer to:

- Jennifer Turner (cricketer) (born 1969), New Zealand international cricketer
- Jennifer Turner (musician), singer/songwriter musician and producer
