= Zed Ndamane =

South African umpire and former cricketer (born 1964)

Personal information
- Full name: Zama Thembekile Anderson Ndamane
- Born: 3 July 1964 de Aar, South Africa
- Died: 19 July 2025 (aged 61); Gqeberha, South Africa
- Role: Umpire, Match referee

Umpiring information
- WODIs umpired: 8 (2004–2005)
- Source: ESPNcricinfo, 25 July 2025

Zama Thembekile Anderson Ndamane (3 July 1964 – 19 July 2025), commonly known as Zed Ndamane, was a South African cricket umpire, match referee and cricketer.

Ndamane was the reserve umpire during the 2009 Indian Premier League final, and one of the on-field umpires during the 2005 Women's World Cup Final. He was one of the match officials at the 2004 Intercontinental Cup. He umpired 29 first-class matches in South Africa, and one in Kenya, between 2004 and 2010.

Ndamane died on 19 July 2025 in Gqeberha, at the age of 61.
