= Debbie Ford (cricketer) =

New Zealand cricketer

Personal information
- Full name: Deborah Lee Ford
- Born: 5 February 1965 (age 61); Christchurch, New Zealand
- Batting: Left-handed
- Bowling: Right-arm medium
- Role: Batter

International information
- National side: New Zealand (1988)
- ODI debut: 30 November 1988 v England
- Last ODI: 17 December 1988 v Ireland

Domestic team information
- Years: Team
- 1983/84–1984/85: Southern Districts
- 1985/86–1989/90: Canterbury

Career statistics
Competition	WODI	WFC	WLA
Matches	3	17	18
Runs scored	46	471	510
Batting average	23.00	26.16	36.42
100s/50s	0/0	0/1	0/4
Top score	35	68	89*
Balls bowled	36	444	36
Wickets	0	5	0
Bowling average	–	43.80	–
5 wickets in innings	0	0	0
10 wickets in match	0	0	0
Best bowling	–	2/18	–
Catches/stumpings	1/–	10/–	5/–
- Source: CricketArchive, 21 July 2021

Deborah Lee "Debbie" Ford (née Murray, born 5 February 1965) is a New Zealand former cricketer who played primarily as a left-handed batter. She appeared in 3 One Day Internationals for New Zealand, all at the 1988 World Cup.

Ford was born in Christchurch. In New Zealand's domestic competitions, she played for Southern Districts and Canterbury. Ford made her international debut at the 1988 World Cup in Australia, appearing in three of her team's nine matches. She debuted against England in New Zealand's second match of the tournament, coming in sixth in the batting order and making 11 runs. She did not re-appear until New Zealand's sixth match of the tournament, against Ireland. In that game, she opened the batting with Jackie Clark and made 35 runs, putting on a 131-run partnership for the opening wicket. Ford's only other game in the tournament was also against Ireland, in the third-place play-off. She neither batted nor bowled.

== Rugby Union career ==
Ford made her rugby union debut for the Black Ferns on 22 July 1989 against the California Grizzlies at Christchurch.

She competed at RugbyFest 1990 for the Crusadettes, Canterbury and New Zealand. She was also named in the 1991 Women's Rugby World Cup squad.
