= Sheree Harris =

Personal information
- Full name: Sheree Angela Harris
- Born: 27 January 1959 (age 67); Waikari, New Zealand
- Batting: Right-handed
- Bowling: Right-arm fast
- Role: Bowler

International information
- National side: New Zealand (1978)
- ODI debut (cap 18): 1 January 1978 v Australia
- Last ODI: 5 January 1978 v India

Domestic team information
- Years: Team
- 1975/76–1982/83: Canterbury
- 1983/84–1985/86: Southern Districts

Career statistics
Competition	WODI	WFC	WLA
Matches	2	25	5
Runs scored	1	233	4
Batting average	–	15.53	2.00
100s/50s	0/0	0/1	0/0
Top score	1*	52	3
Balls bowled	18	1,358	130
Wickets	0	33	1
Bowling average	–	20.42	54.00
5 wickets in innings	0	2	0
10 wickets in match	0	0	0
Best bowling	–	5/41	1/19
Catches/stumpings	0/–	3/–	1/–
- Source: CricketArchive, 11 November 2021

Sheree Angela Harris (born 27 January 1959) is a New Zealand former cricketer who played as a right-arm pace bowler. She appeared in two One Day Internationals for New Zealand at the 1978 Women's World Cup. She played domestic cricket for Canterbury and Southern Districts.

Harris was born in Waikari, a small town in the Canterbury region. She made her debut for the Canterbury women's team during the 1975–76 season. Harris made her international debut for New Zealand at the 1978 World Cup in India, aged 18. She opened the bowling with Eileen Badham against Australia in the first match of the tournament, conceding 19 runs from three overs without taking a wicket. She did not bowl in the next match against India, and was absent from the team for the final match against England. For the last few seasons of her domestic career (in the mid-1980s), Harris played for the short-lived Southern Districts team.
