= Southern Districts women's cricket team =

New Zealand women's cricket team

Southern Districts Women
Team information
- Founded: Unknown First recorded match: 1969
- Dissolved: 1988

History
- First-class debut: Canterbury in 1965 at Melville Park, Auckland
- HBJS wins: 0

The Southern Districts women's cricket team was the women's representative cricket team for southern New Zealand, primarily the regions of Otago and Canterbury. From 1983–84 to 1987–88 they competed in the Hansells Cup, and were eventually replaced in the competition by a returning Otago team in 1998–99.

== History ==
Southern Districts played their first match in 1969, against a touring England side, with the match ending in a draw.

Southern Districts did not play another match until the 1983–84 season, when they joined the Hansells Cup, which at the time was a 2-day competition. The team was made up of players from Otago, who stopped competing after the 1982–83 season, and players who missed out on the Canterbury side. They finished bottom of the group in their first season, failing to win a match. They won their first match the following season, 1984–85, beating Auckland, and achieved their best finish, ending the season in 4th place. Their victory over Auckland was the only win they would ever achieve, however, and they finished bottom of the league in the subsequent three season. After this, ahead of the 1988–99 season, the tournament reverted to 5 teams competing, and Southern Districts were disbanded. Otago rejoined the league in 1998–99.

== Players ==
=== Notable players ===
Players who played for Southern Districts and played internationally are listed below, in order of first international appearance (given in brackets):

- (New Zealand) Jenny Olson (1969)
- (New Zealand) Carol Marett (1972)
- (New Zealand) Barbara Bevege (1973)
- (New Zealand) Sue Rattray (1973)
- (New Zealand) Sheree Harris (1978)
- (New Zealand) Jan Hall (1982)
- (New Zealand) Kirsty Bond (1988)
- (New Zealand) Sarah Illingworth (1988)
- (New Zealand) Jennifer Turner (1988)
- (New Zealand) Debbie Ford (1988)
- (New Zealand) Maia Lewis (1992)
- (New Zealand) Justine Russell (1995)
- (New Zealand) Delwyn Brownlee (1995)
- (New Zealand) Karen Le Comber (1996)

== Honours ==
- Hallyburton Johnstone Shield:
  - Winners (0):
  - Best Finish: 4th (1984–85)

== See also ==
- Canterbury Magicians
- Otago Sparks
