= Shyama Shaw =

Indian cricketer (born 1971)

Personal information
- Full name: Shyama Dey Shaw
- Born: 8 July 1971 (age 55); Howrah, West Bengal, India
- Batting: Left-handed
- Bowling: Left-arm medium
- Role: All-rounder

International information
- National side: India (1995–1997)
- Test debut (cap 46): 17 November 1995 v England
- Last Test: 10 December 1995 v England
- ODI debut (cap 50): 1 December 1995 v England
- Last ODI: 24 December 1997 v Australia

Domestic team information
- Years: Team
- 1990/91–1996/97: Bengal

Career statistics
Competition	WTest	WODI	WFC	WLA
Matches	3	5	6	22
Runs scored	184	22	261	414
Batting average	61.33	7.33	65.25	23.00
100s/50s	0/2	0/0	0/2	0/1
Top score	66	11	66	68
Balls bowled	336	6	336	80
Wickets	5	0	5	17
Bowling average	21.40	–	21.40	12.38
5 wickets in innings	0	0	0	0
10 wickets in match	0	0	0	0
Best bowling	3/19	–	3/19	3/24
Catches/stumpings	1/–	0/–	1/–	0/–
- Source: CricketArchive, 18 August 2022

Shyama Dey Shaw (born 8 July 1971) is an Indian former cricketer who played as an all-rounder, batting left-handed and bowling left-arm medium. She appeared in three Test matches and five One Day Internationals for India from 1995 to 1997. She played domestic cricket for Bengal.
