= Knottingley Park =

Park in Waimate, New Zealand

Coordinates: 44°44′52.40″S 171°03′18.48″E

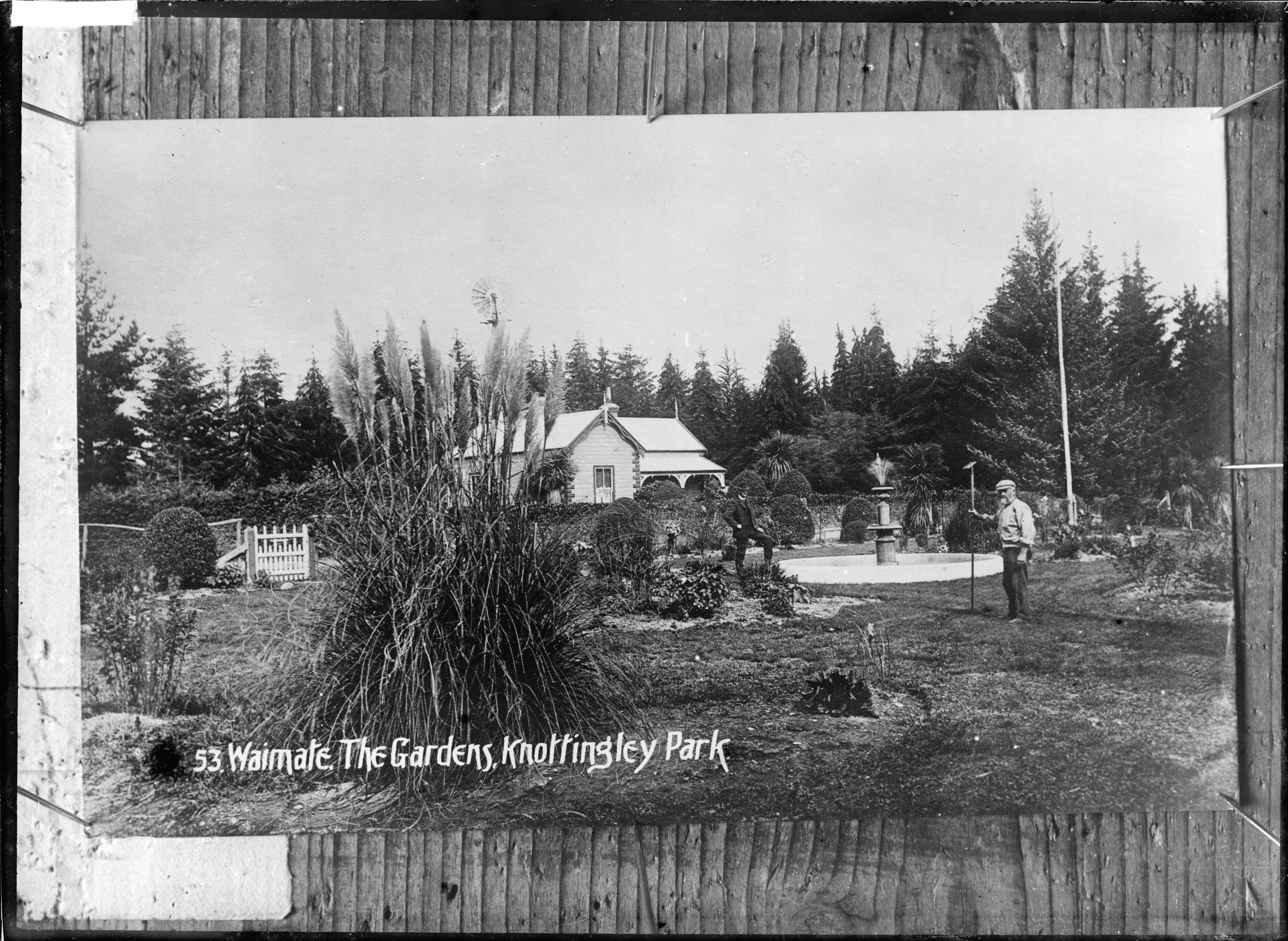
- Gardens at Knottingley Park
- Interactive map of Knottingley Park

Ground information
- Location: Waimate, New Zealand
- Country: New Zealand
- Establishment: 1902 (first recorded match)

Team information
Canterbury	(1985)
- As of 2 November 2011; Source: Ground profile

Knottingley Park is a park in Waimate, Canterbury, New Zealand. The park occupies 36 hectares on the south-eastern outskirts of Waimate on Waihao Back Road, and includes an arboretum, a cricket ground and a caravan park.

The first recorded match held on the cricket ground came in 1902 when South Canterbury played North Otago. The ground later held a single List A match in the 1984/85 Shell Cup when Canterbury played Central Districts, which resulted in a 6 wicket victory for Central Districts.
