= Reshma Gandhi =

Indian cricketer (born 1974)

Personal information
- Born: 16 December 1974 (age 51); Ahmednagar, India
- Batting: Right-handed
- Role: Wicket-keeper

International information
- National side: India
- ODI debut (cap 54): 26 June 1999 v Ireland
- Last ODI: 11 July 1999 v England

Career statistics
Competition	WODI
Matches	2
Runs scored	122
Batting average	122
100s/50s	1/0
Top score	104*
Catches/stumpings	1/1
- Source: CricketArchive, 8 May 2020

Reshma Gandhi (born 16 December 1974) is a former One Day International cricketer who represented India. She is a right-handed batter and wicket-keeper.

== International career ==
She has played two ODIs as a wicket-keeper and also scored an unbeaten century.

Gandhi is one of the five woman cricketers who have scored a century on debut. It was in Ireland against Ireland women's cricket team in 1999. She, along with Mithali Raj had a partnership of 258 unbroken runs, where Gandhi scored 104 runs while Raj scored an unbeaten 114 runs.
