= Albert Park, Te Awamutu =

Sports venue in Te Awamutu, New Zealand

Coordinates: 38°0′37.22″S 175°19′50.22″E

Albert Park
- Interactive map of Albert Park

Ground information
- Location: Te Awamutu, New Zealand
- Country: New Zealand
- Establishment: 1981 (first recorded match)

Team information
Northern Districts	(1988)
- As of 3 November 2011; Source: Ground profile

Albert Park is a cricket and rugby union ground in Te Awamutu, Waikato, New Zealand. The first recorded cricket match held on the ground came in 1980 when Midlands played Bay of Plenty in the 1980/81 Hawke Cup. The ground later held a first-class match in the 1987/88 Shell Trophy when Northern Districts played Central Districts, with the match ending in a draw.
