= Manju Nadgoda =

Indian cricketer (born 1976)

Personal information
- Full name: Manju Nadgoda
- Born: 11 July 1976 (age 50); Belgaum, India
- Batting: Right-handed

International information
- National side: India
- Only ODI (cap 49): 1 December 1995 v England

Career statistics
Competition	WODI
Matches	1
Runs scored	1
Batting average	1.00
100s/50s	-/-
Top score	1
Catches/stumpings	0/–
- Source: CricketArchive, 9 May 2020

Manju Nadgoda (born 11 July 1976, in Belgaum, Karnataka) is a former One Day International cricketer who represented India. She played in a single One Day International, opening the batting but only managing to score 1 run.
