= Lissy Samuel =

Indian cricketer (born 1967)

Personal information
- Full name: Lissy Samuel
- Born: 11 December 1967 (age 58); Madras, India
- Batting: Right-handed
- Bowling: Right-arm medium-fast

International information
- National side: India
- Only ODI (cap 51): 15 December 1995 v England
- Source: ESPNcricinfo, 14 March 2024

Lissy Samuel (born 11 December 1967) is a former Indian cricketer who represented India in ODI cricket. She played a solitary One Day International in 1995. She is a right-hand batter and bowls right-arm medium fast.
