= Mandeville Sports Centre =

Sports venue in New Zealand

Coordinates: 43°23′09.24″S 172°32′09.95″E

Mandeville Sports Grounds
- MSC
- Interactive map of Mandeville Sports Grounds

Ground information
- Location: Mandeville North, New Zealand
- Country: New Zealand
- Establishment: 1980 (first recorded match)

Team information
Canterbury	(1990)
- As of 2 November 2011; Source: Ground profile

Mandeville Sports Centre is a sports ground and community park in Mandeville North, Canterbury, New Zealand. The park is home to 13 clubs facilitating archery, equestrian events, netball, rugby, tennis, cricket, dog clubs, bowls and squash. The ground held a single List A match in the 1990/91 Shell Cup when Canterbury played Wellington, which resulted in a 19 run victory for Wellington. A number of other sports are played at the complex.
