= Delwyn Brownlee =

New Zealand cricketer (born 1969)

Personal information
- Full name: Delwyn Karen Brownlee
- Born: 10 January 1969 (age 57); Christchurch, New Zealand
- Batting: Right-handed
- Role: All-rounder

International information
- National side: New Zealand (1995)
- Only Test (cap 106): 28 February 1995 v Australia

Domestic team information
- Years: Team
- 1987/88: Southern Districts
- 1993/94: Canterbury
- 1994/95–1997/98: Central Districts
- 2001/02: Canterbury

Career statistics
Competition	WTest	WFC	WLA
Matches	1	15	25
Runs scored	17	379	361
Batting average	8.50	17.22	17.19
100s/50s	0/0	0/2	0/3
Top score	12	86	85*
Balls bowled	–	1,692	115
Wickets	–	41	1
Bowling average	–	15.51	77.00
5 wickets in innings	–	2	0
10 wickets in match	–	1	0
Best bowling	–	7/62	1/13
Catches/stumpings	0/–	6/–	4/–
- Source: CricketArchive, 28 April 2021

Delwyn Karen Brownlee (born 10 January 1969) is a New Zealand former cricketer who played as an all-rounder. She appeared in one Test match for New Zealand in 1995. She played domestic cricket for Southern Districts, Canterbury and Central Districts.
