= Justine Fryer =

New Zealand cricketer (born 1972)

Personal information
- Full name: Justine Anne Fryer
- Born: 8 October 1972 (age 54); Dunedin, New Zealand
- Batting: Right-handed
- Bowling: Slow left-arm orthodox
- Role: Bowler

International information
- National side: New Zealand (1996–1997)
- Test debut (cap 108): 8 February 1996 v Australia
- Last Test: 12 July 1996 v England
- ODI debut (cap 69): 28 January 1997 v Pakistan
- Last ODI: 17 December 1997 v India

Domestic team information
- Years: Team
- 1993/94–1998/99: Wellington

Career statistics
| Competition | WTest | WODI | WFC | WLA |
|---|---|---|---|---|
| Matches | 3 | 7 | 15 | 49 |
| Runs scored | 7 | 1 | 31 | 50 |
| Batting average | – | – | 7.75 | 3.84 |
| 100s/50s | 0/0 | 0/0 | 0/0 | 0/0 |
| Top score | 7* | 1* | 7* | 11 |
| Balls bowled | 360 | 198 | 2,418 | 2,300 |
| Wickets | 5 | 10 | 38 | 57 |
| Bowling average | 30.80 | 11.50 | 20.65 | 20.57 |
| 5 wickets in innings | 0 | 0 | 2 | 0 |
| 10 wickets in match | 0 | 0 | 0 | 0 |
| Best bowling | 4/37 | 3/8 | 5/23 | 4/16 |
| Catches/stumpings | 1/– | 0/– | 2/– | 16/– |
- Source: CricketArchive, 21 April 2021

Justine Anne Fryer (born 8 October 1972) is a New Zealand former cricketer who played as a slow left-arm orthodox bowler. She appeared in 3 Test matches and 7 One Day Internationals for New Zealand between 1996 and 1997. She played domestic cricket for Wellington.
