= Rupanjali Shastri =

Indian cricketer (born 1975)

Personal information
- Full name: Rupanjali Shastri
- Born: 14 November 1975 (age 50); Indore, India
- Nickname: Rupi
- Batting: Right-handed
- Bowling: Right-arm off break
- Role: All-rounder

International information
- National side: India (1999–2000)
- Only Test (cap 51): 15 July 1999 v England
- ODI debut (cap 57): 26 June 1999 v Ireland
- Last ODI: 20 December 2000 v New Zealand

Domestic team information
- Years: Team
- 1993/94: Madhya Pradesh
- 1994/95–1996/97: Air India
- 1997/98: Madhya Pradesh
- 1998/99–2001/02: Railways

Career statistics
Competition	WTest	WODI	WFC	WLA
Matches	1	12	15	48
Runs scored	15	115	226	483
Batting average	7.50	16.42	20.54	24.15
100s/50s	0/0	0/0	0/0	0/2
Top score	11	29*	48	54
Balls bowled	240	578	1,497	1,934
Wickets	3	17	41	63
Bowling average	20.00	19.00	16.62	15.19
5 wickets in innings	0	0	2	0
10 wickets in match	0	0	0	0
Best bowling	3/54	3/25	6/69	4/8
Catches/stumpings	0/–	7/–	5/–	20/–
- Source: CricketArchive, 24 June 2022

Rupanjali Shastri (Hindi: रुपांजलि शास्त्री; born 14 November 1975) is an Indian former cricketer who played as a right-handed batter and right-arm off break bowler. She appeared in one Test match and 12 One Day Internationals (ODI) for India in 1999 and 2000. Shastri played as an all-rounder, making her ODI debut against Ireland in June 1999 and her Test debut against England the following month. She played domestic cricket for Madhya Pradesh, Air India and Railways.
