= Stephanie Theodore =

Australian cricketer (born 1970)

Personal information
- Full name: Stephanie Rena Theodore
- Born: 30 September 1970 (age 56); France
- Batting: Right-handed
- Bowling: Right-arm medium
- Role: Bowler

International information
- National side: Australia
- Only Test (cap 128): 28 February 1995 v New Zealand
- Only ODI (cap 78): 14 February 1995 v New Zealand

Domestic team information
- Years: Team
- 1991/92–2001/02: Victoria

Career statistics
Competition	Test	ODI	FC	LA
Matches	1	1	7	75
Runs scored	–	5	20	771
Batting average	–	5.00	6.66	15.73
100s/50s	–	0/0	0/0	0/1
Top score	–	5	9*	50
Balls bowled	156	–	486	1,797
Wickets	1	–	6	46
Bowling average	156.00	–	37.33	20.19
5 wickets in innings	0	–	0	1
10 wickets in match	0	–	0	0
Best bowling	1/47	–	4/26	7/14
Catches/stumpings	1/–	1/–	2/–	26/–
- Source: CricketArchive, 5 June 2014

Stephanie Rena Theodore (born 30 September 1970) is an Australian former cricket player. She played domestic cricket for Victoria between 1991–92 and 2001–02. Theodore played one Test and one One Day International for the Australia national women's cricket team.
