= Melissa Reynard =

English cricketer (born 1972)

Personal information
- Full name: Melissa Anne Reynard
- Born: 14 March 1972 (age 54); Harrogate, Yorkshire, England
- Batting: Right-handed
- Bowling: Left-arm medium
- Role: All-rounder

International information
- National side: England (1995–2002)
- Test debut (cap 117): 17 November 1995 v India
- Last Test: 15 July 1999 v India
- ODI debut (cap 67): 18 July 1995 v Netherlands
- Last ODI: 11 August 2002 v India

Domestic team information
- Years: Team
- 1990–2006: Yorkshire

Career statistics
Competition	WTest	WODI	WFC	WLA
Matches	6	54	7	163
Runs scored	82	384	83	2,885
Batting average	13.66	13.24	13.83	30.36
100s/50s	0/1	0/0	0/1	2/19
Top score	60*	46*	60*	109
Balls bowled	654	1,923	852	5,863
Wickets	5	46	8	142
Bowling average	65.60	29.08	49.62	21.80
5 wickets in innings	0	0	0	0
10 wickets in match	0	0	0	0
Best bowling	2/39	4/6	2/23	4/6
Catches/stumpings	4/–	3/–	5/–	32/–
- Source: CricketArchive, 13 February 2021

Melissa Anne Reynard (born 14 March 1972) is a former English cricketer and member of the England women's cricket team. In a career spanning 1990 to 2006, she played 6 Test matches and 54 Women's One Day Internationals. She is a left-arm medium pace bowler and right-handed batsman.
