= Victoria Park, Whanganui =

Cricket ground in Whanganui, New Zealand

Coordinates: 39°55′29.97″S 175°02′03.39″E

Victoria Park
- Interactive map of Victoria Park

Ground information
- Location: Whanganui, New Zealand
- Country: New Zealand
- Establishment: 1890

International information
- Only women's ODI: 25 February 1995: New Zealand v Australia

Team information
Central Districts Women	(1998–2006)
Central Districts	(1991–2002)
- As of 1 September 2020; Source: Ground profile

Victoria Park is a cricket ground in Whanganui, Manawatū-Whanganui, New Zealand.

The ground is located in the park of the same name, on Parsons Street, Whanganui. It houses the headquarters of the Whanganui Cricket Association. There are four cricket pitches and four fields on the ground, and other sporting facilities in the park.

A cricket ground was first developed in the park in 1890. The first inter-provincial match held at Victoria Park was between Wanganui and Manawatu in March 1896. The first Hawke Cup match there came in 1947 when Wanganui played Taranaki.

The ground later held its first first-class match during the 1990/91 Shell Trophy when Central Districts played Northern Districts. Between the 1990/91 and 2002/03 season's, eleven first-class matches were held there, the last of which saw Central Districts play Otago in the 2002/03 State Championship. Between the 1994/95 and 2000/01 seasons, Central Districts played three List A matches at Victoria Park.

A single Women's One Day International was played there on 25 February 1995, when New Zealand Women played Australia Women in the New Zealand Women's Centenary Tournament. Central Districts Women used Victoria Park as a home venue in the State League between 1998 and 2006.
