= Jo Garey =

Australian cricketer (born 1974)

Personal information
- Full name: Joanne Kathleen Garey
- Born: 1 May 1974 (age 52); Sydney, New South Wales
- Batting: Left-handed
- Bowling: Right-arm fast–medium

International information
- National side: Australia
- Only Test (cap 131): 8 February 1996 v New Zealand
- ODI debut (cap 74): 14 February 1995 v New Zealand
- Last ODI: 4 February 1996 v New Zealand

Career statistics
Competition	Test	ODI	FC	LA
Matches	1	6	7	46
Runs scored	–	9	76	502
Batting average	–	3.00	38.00	20.08
100s/50s	–	0/0	0/0	0/2
Top score	–	7	29*	60
Balls bowled	–	306	651	2,282
Wickets	–	9	7	68
Bowling average	–	15.11	28.14	14.55
5 wickets in innings	–	0	0	0
10 wickets in match	–	0	0	0
Best bowling	–	2/12	3/42	4/13
Catches/stumpings	0/–	2/–	1/–	8/–
- Source: CricInfo, 7 August 2025

Joanne Kathleen Garey (born 1 May 1974) is an Australian former cricketer.

Garey played for the New South Wales women's cricket team between 1993 and 1998. She played twenty-one domestic limited overs matches, including fifteen Women's National Cricket League games.

Garey played one Test match and six One Day Internationals for the Australia national women's cricket team.
