= Pramila Bhatt =

Indian cricketer (born 1969)

Personal information
- Born: 16 September 1969 (age 57); Bangalore, Karnataka, India
- Batting: Right-handed
- Bowling: Right-arm off break
- Role: All-rounder

International information
- National side: India
- Test debut (cap 35): 26 January 1991 v Australia
- Last Test: 10 December 1995 v England
- ODI debut (cap 36): 20 July 1993 v West Indies
- Last ODI: 24 December 1997 v Australia

Career statistics
Competition	WTest	WODI
Matches	5	22
Runs scored	123	136
Batting average	24.60	12.36
100s/50s	0/0	0/0
Top score	42	33*
Balls bowled	1,016	1,158
Wickets	9	28
Bowling average	34.77	18.92
5 wickets in innings	0	0
10 wickets in match	0	0
Best bowling	3/42	4/25
Catches/stumpings	1/–	4/–
- Source: CricketArchive, 11 May 2020

Pramila Korikar-Bhatt (born 16 September 1969) is an Indian former cricketer.

== Career ==
She played five women's Test matches between 1991 and 1996 and 22 women's ODIs for India between 1993 and 1998. She captained the Indian team in one Test match 7 ODI matches. An all-rounder, for most of her ODI career she batted in the middle order and bowled right-arm offspin. Her tenure as captain is best remembered for the tied-ODI match against New Zealand in the 1997/98 Women's Cricket World Cup.

== Personal life ==
She currently lives in Abu Dhabi with her husband, Sarangan Venugopalan and their two sons, Siddanth and Sanjith.
