= Smallbone Park =

Cricket ground in Rotorua, New Zealand

Coordinates: 38°09′15.66″S 176°13′53.85″E

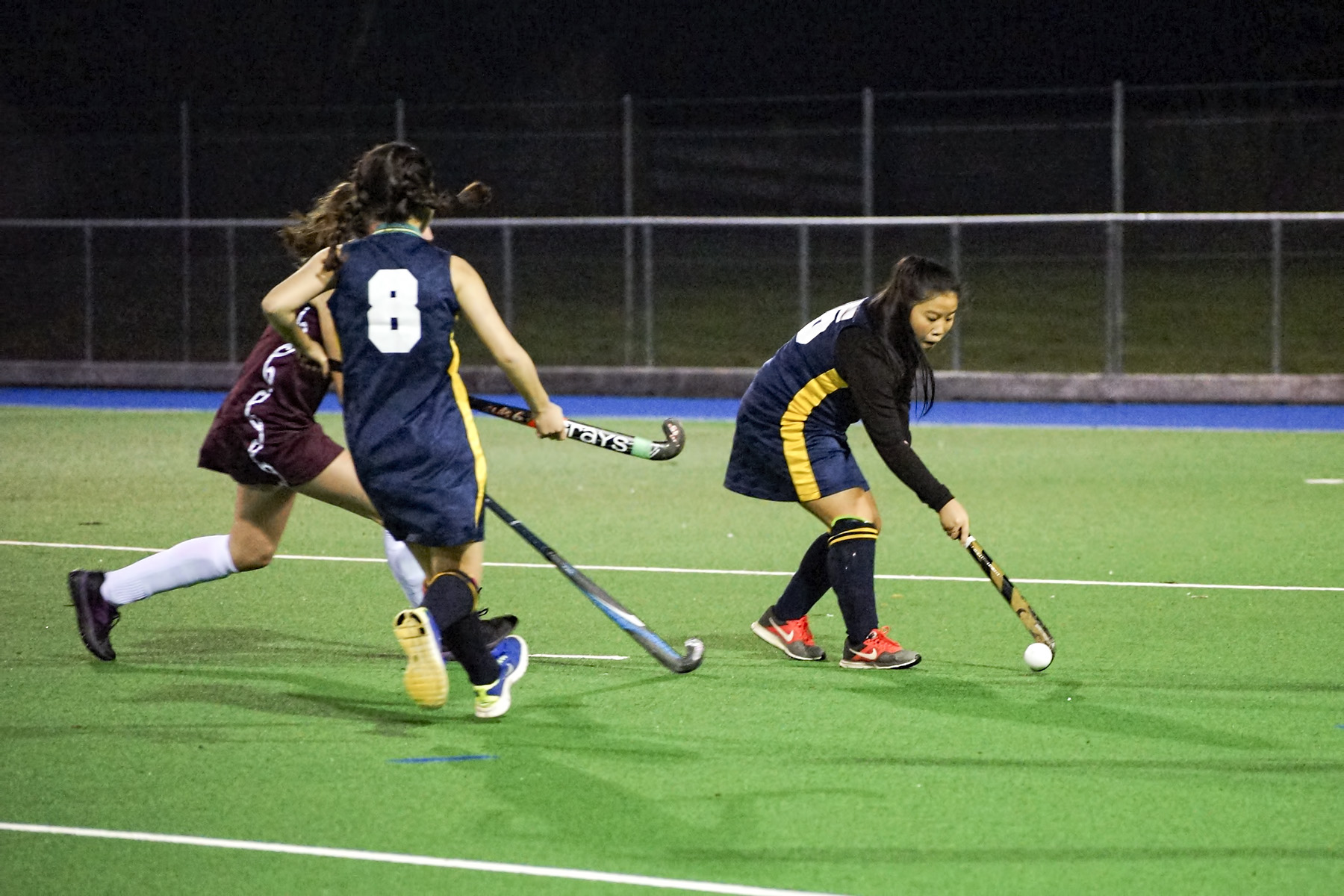
- 2017 Grading match between Rotorua Lakes High School and Rotorua Girls' High School

Ground information
- Location: Rotorua, New Zealand
- Establishment: 1938 (first recorded match)

Team information
Northern Districts	(1969–2003)
- As of 3 November 2011; Source: Ground profile

Smallbone Park is a cricket ground in Rotorua, Bay of Plenty, New Zealand. The first recorded match held on the ground came in 1938 when Bay of Plenty played Waiapu.

The ground held its first first-class match during the 1968/69 Plunket Shield when Northern Districts played Otago. Between the 1968/69 and 1995/96 seasons, seventeen first-class matches were held there, the last of which saw Northern Districts play Central Districts in the 1995/96 Shell Trophy. The first List A match held there came when Northern Districts played Auckland in the 1984/85 Shell Cup. Northern Districts played six further List A matches at the ground, the last of which came in the 2002/03 State Shield against Otago.

A single Women's One Day International was played there on 25 February 1995, when Australia Women played India Women in the New Zealand Women's Centenary Tournament.
