= Levin Domain =

Recreational reserve in Levin, New Zealand

Coordinates: 40°37′17.31″S 175°16′55.10″E

- Interactive map of Levin Domain

Ground information
- Location: Levin, New Zealand
- Country: New Zealand

International information
- First women's ODI: 20 January 1994: New Zealand v Australia
- Last women's ODI: 16 February 1995: Australia v India

Team information
Central Districts	(1985–1995)
- As of 1 September 2020; Source: Ground profile

Levin Domain, also known as Courtesy Domain, is a recreational reserve in Levin, Manawatū-Whanganui, New Zealand. Situated on Bath Street, it is about 200 metres from Levin's main street, Oxford Street. It includes the district's main rugby union ground, and it is also home to the Levin tennis and squash clubs, and the Laurie Roberts Velodrome. It also includes small areas of parkland. It was formerly also a cricket ground.

Rugby union has been played at Levin Domain since 1908. It is the headquarters and home ground of the Horowhenua-Kapiti Rugby Football Union. They compete in the Heartland Championship.

The first major cricket match held on the ground came in 1966 when Horowhenua played Southern Hawke's Bay in the 1965/66 Hawke Cup. List A cricket was first played there in 1985 when Central Districts played Auckland in the 1984/85 Shell Cup. The ground held seven further List A matches, the last of which came during the 1995/96 season when Central Districts played Northern Districts. Three first-class matches have been played there, with Central Districts playing Canterbury in the 1985/86 Shell Trophy and Wellington in the 1986/87 and 1987/88 Shell Trophy seasons. Two Women's One Day Internationals have held there: New Zealand played Australia in January 1994, and Australia played India in the 1994–95 New Zealand Women's Centenary Tournament. The headquarters of cricket in Levin are now at Donnelly Park.

In July 2025 the Horowhenua District Council opened Levin Domain to the public during daylight hours as part of an effort to reinvigorate the town centre.
