= Karen Musson =

New Zealand cricketer (born 1967)

Personal information
- Full name: Karen Jane Musson
- Born: 27 June 1967 (age 59); Hastings, New Zealand
- Batting: Right-handed
- Bowling: Right-arm medium
- Role: All-rounder

International information
- National side: New Zealand (1993–1996)
- Only Test (cap 109): 8 February 1996 v Australia
- ODI debut (cap 61): 16 January 1993 v Australia
- Last ODI: 3 February 1996 v Australia

Domestic team information
- Years: Team
- 1986/87–1989/90: Central Districts
- 1990/91–1995/96: Wellington

Career statistics
Competition	WTest	WODI	WFC	WLA
Matches	1	13	22	58
Runs scored	–	86	723	833
Batting average	–	10.75	30.12	18.10
100s/50s	–	0/0	0/4	0/2
Top score	–	31	76	93*
Balls bowled	–	524	2,188	2,793
Wickets	–	10	36	61
Bowling average	–	25.30	23.00	22.01
5 wickets in innings	–	0	1	1
10 wickets in match	–	0	0	0
Best bowling	–	3/22	5/24	7/19
Catches/stumpings	0/–	3/–	7/–	10/–
- Source: CricketArchive, 21 April 2021

Karen Jane Musson (born 27 June 1967) is a New Zealand former cricketer who played as an all-rounder, batting right-handed and bowling right-arm medium. She appeared in 1 Test match and 13 One Day Internationals for New Zealand between 1993 and 1996. She played domestic cricket for Central Districts and Wellington.
