= Smitha Harikrishna =

Indian cricketer (born 1973)

Personal information
- Born: 6 November 1973 (age 53); Bangalore, India
- Batting: Right-handed
- Bowling: Right-arm medium-fast

International information
- National side: India
- ODI debut (cap 44): 12 February 1995 v New Zealand
- Last ODI: 20 December 2000 v New Zealand

Career statistics
Competition	WODI
Matches	22
Runs scored	231
Batting average	17.76
100s/50s	0/0
Top score	34
Balls bowled	528
Wickets	8
Bowling average	29.00
5 wickets in innings	0
10 wickets in match	0
Best bowling	2/10
Catches/stumpings	3/–
- Source: CricketArchive, 9 May 2020

Smitha Harikrishna (born 6 November 1973) is an Indian former One Day International cricketer who represented the national team. She is a right-hand batsman and bowls right-arm medium pace. She has played 22 ODIs for India, scoring 231 runs and taking 8 wickets.

In July 2007, Harikrishna coached the United Arab Emirates women's national team at its debut international tournament, the 2007 Asian Cricket Council (ACC) Women's Tournament. The team lost all three of its matches, including the debut match against Bangladesh were the UAE women were bowled out for nine runs.
