= Sangita Dabir =

Indian cricketer (born 1971)

Personal information
- Full name: Sangita Dabir
- Born: 22 January 1971 (age 55); Nagpur, India
- Batting: Left-handed
- Bowling: Slow left-arm orthodox
- Role: All-rounder

International information
- National side: India (1993–1997)
- Test debut (cap 38): 7 February 1995 v New Zealand
- Last Test: 22 December 1997 v South Africa
- ODI debut (cap 41): 21 July 1993 v Australia
- Last ODI: 22 December 1997 v South Africa

Domestic team information
- Years: Team
- 1988: Vidarbha
- 1993/94–1996/97: Railways

Career statistics
| Competition | WTest | WODI | WFC | WLA |
|---|---|---|---|---|
| Matches | 4 | 19 | 12 | 33 |
| Runs scored | 264 | 156 | 447 | 370 |
| Batting average | 52.80 | 11.14 | 44.70 | 19.47 |
| 100s/50s | 0/3 | 0/0 | 1/3 | 0/1 |
| Top score | 60 | 31 | 101* | 64 |
| Balls bowled | 585 | 936 | 853 | 936 |
| Wickets | 10 | 20 | 23 | 48 |
| Bowling average | 13.60 | 21.10 | 11.91 | 12.08 |
| 5 wickets in innings | 0 | 0 | 0 | 1 |
| 10 wickets in match | 0 | 0 | 0 | 0 |
| Best bowling | 4/36 | 4/22 | 4/36 | 5/19 |
| Catches/stumpings | 6/– | 2/– | 9/– | 2/– |
- Source: CricketArchive, 25 November 2022

Sangita Dabir (born 22 January 1971) is an Indian former cricketer who played as a left-handed batter and a slow left-arm orthodox bowler. She appeared in four Test matches and 19 One Day Internationals for India between 1993 and 1997. She played domestic cricket for Vidarbha and Railways.
