= Laya Francis =

Indian cricketer (born 1963)

Personal information
- Full name: Laya Francis
- Born: 22 March 1963 (age 63); Bombay, India
- Batting: Right-handed
- Bowling: Right-arm medium-fast
- Role: Bowler

International information
- National side: India (1993–1995)
- Test debut (cap 40): 7 February 1995 v New Zealand
- Last Test: 20 December 1995 v England
- ODI debut (cap 37): 20 July 1993 v West Indies
- Last ODI: 15 December 1995 v England

Domestic team information
- Years: Team
- 1986/87–1995/96: Railways

Career statistics
Competition	WTest	WODI	WFC	WLA
Matches	4	11	11	28
Runs scored	6	13	13	14
Batting average	1.50	2.60	2.60	2.33
100s/50s	0/0	0/0	0/0	0/0
Top score	4	6	6	6
Balls bowled	558	510	510	708
Wickets	4	7	7	43
Bowling average	38.75	27.28	27.28	10.80
5 wickets in innings	0	0	0	2
10 wickets in match	0	0	0	0
Best bowling	2/20	2/15	2/15	5/8
Catches/stumpings	1/–	0/–	0/–	1/–
- Source: CricketArchive, 16 August 2022

Laya Francis (born 22 March 1963) is an Indian former cricketer who played as a right-arm medium-fast bowler for the India women's national cricket team. She appeared in four Test matches and 11 One Day Internationals for India between 1993 and 1995. She played domestic cricket for Railways.
