= Rishijae Mudgal =

Indian cricketer (born 1972)

Personal information
- Full name: Rishijae Mudgal
- Born: 8 April 1972 (age 54); Delhi, India
- Batting: Right-handed
- Bowling: Right-arm off break
- Role: Batter

International information
- National side: India (1995)
- Test debut (cap 43): 7 February 1995 v New Zealand
- Last Test: 10 December 1995 v England
- ODI debut (cap 46): 12 February 1995 v New Zealand
- Last ODI: 15 December 1995 v England

Domestic team information
- Years: Team
- 1992/93–1993/94: Delhi
- 1994/95–1996/97: Air India

Career statistics
Competition	WTest	WODI
Matches	2	6
Runs scored	30	15
Batting average	10.00	3.75
100s/50s	0/0	0/0
Top score	24*	15
Balls bowled	12	–
Wickets	0	–
Bowling average	–	–
5 wickets in innings	0	–
10 wickets in match	0	–
Best bowling	–	–
Catches/stumpings	3/–	1/–
- Source: CricketArchive, 17 August 2022

Rishijae Mudgal (Hindi: रिशिजे मुद्गल; born 8 April 1972) is an Indian former cricketer who played as a right-handed batter. She appeared in two Test matches and six One Day Internationals for India in 1995. She played domestic cricket for Delhi and Air India.
