= Kirsty Flavell =

New Zealand cricketer (born 1967)

Personal information
- Full name: Kirsty Elizabeth Flavell
- Born: 20 November 1967 (age 58); Christchurch, New Zealand
- Batting: Right-handed
- Bowling: Right-arm medium
- Role: All-rounder

International information
- National side: New Zealand (1988–1996)
- Test debut (cap 102): 7 February 1995 v India
- Last Test: 12 July 1996 v England
- ODI debut (cap 48): 29 November 1988 v Ireland
- Last ODI: 21 July 1996 v Ireland

Domestic team information
- Years: Team
- 1984/85: Southern Districts
- 1985/86–1995/96: Canterbury

Career statistics
Competition	WTest	WODI	WFC	WLA
Matches	6	38	39	72
Runs scored	473	719	1,275	1,570
Batting average	67.57	29.95	34.45	35.68
100s/50s	1/2	0/2	1/7	0/8
Top score	204	54	204	83*
Balls bowled	–	420	861	646
Wickets	–	7	36	14
Bowling average	–	22.28	10.27	17.21
5 wickets in innings	–	0	1	0
10 wickets in match	–	0	0	0
Best bowling	–	2/5	6/33	3/7
Catches/stumpings	2/–	5/–	15/–	14/–
- Source: CricketArchive, 28 April 2021

Kirsty Elizabeth Flavell (née Bond; born 20 November 1967) is a retired New Zealand cricketer who played as a right-handed batter and right-arm medium bowler. She appeared in 6 Test matches and 38 One Day Internationals for New Zealand between 1988 and 1996. She played domestic cricket for Southern Districts and Canterbury.

She was the first woman to score a double century in a women's Test match, scoring 204 against England in 1996. Flavell has previously been a member of the New Zealand team's selection panel.
