= Sarah Illingworth =

English-born New Zealand cricketer (born 1963)

Personal information
- Full name: Sarah Louise Illingworth
- Born: 9 September 1963 (age 63); Lancaster, Lancashire, England
- Batting: Right-handed
- Role: Wicket-keeper

International information
- National side: New Zealand (1988–1996)
- Test debut (cap 103): 7 February 1995 v India
- Last Test: 12 July 1996 v England
- ODI debut (cap 49): 29 November 1988 v Ireland
- Last ODI: 21 July 1996 v Ireland

Domestic team information
- Years: Team
- 1984/85–1985/86: Southern Districts
- 1986/87–1995/96: Canterbury

Career statistics
Competition	WTest	WODI	WFC	WLA
Matches	6	37	28	73
Runs scored	120	342	699	702
Batting average	30.00	15.54	26.88	20.64
100s/50s	0/0	0/1	0/3	0/3
Top score	40*	51	79	62
Catches/stumpings	5/5	27/21	34/24	45/34
- Source: CricketArchive, 28 April 2021

Sarah Louise Illingworth (born 9 September 1963) is an English-born New Zealand former cricketer who played as a wicket-keeper and right-handed batter. She appeared in 6 Test matches and 37 One Day Internationals for New Zealand between 1988 and 1996. She played domestic cricket for Southern Districts and Canterbury.

Illingworth captained New Zealand in all six Test matches she played, all of them ending in a draw. She also captained 29 WODIs, with New Zealand winning 18, losing 10 and one ending in a no result. She jointly holds the record for the most dismissals in a World Cup innings, with six.
