= Justine Russell =

New Zealand cricketer (born 1974)

Personal information
- Full name: Justine Anne Russell
- Born: 16 November 1974 (age 51); Invercargill, New Zealand
- Batting: Right-handed
- Bowling: Right-arm medium
- Role: Bowler

International information
- National side: New Zealand (1995–1996)
- Only Test (cap 107): 28 February 1995 v Australia
- ODI debut (cap 65): 12 February 1995 v India
- Last ODI: 4 February 1996 v Australia

Domestic team information
- Years: Team
- 1985/86–1987/88: Southern Districts
- 1990/91–1991/92: Wellington
- 1992/93–1995/96: Canterbury

Career statistics
Competition	WTest	WODI	WFC	WLA
Matches	1	5	20	33
Runs scored	39	8	279	109
Batting average	39.00	2.66	19.92	9.08
100s/50s	0/0	0/0	0/0	0/0
Top score	39	8*	39	39*
Balls bowled	78	156	1,482	1,415
Wickets	1	1	22	32
Bowling average	37.00	84.00	24.77	25.46
5 wickets in innings	0	0	0	0
10 wickets in match	0	0	0	0
Best bowling	1/14	1/20	3/27	3/21
Catches/stumpings	0/–	0/–	5/–	4/–
- Source: CricketArchive, 28 April 2021

Justine Anne Russell (born 16 November 1974) is a New Zealand former cricketer who played as a right-arm medium bowler. She appeared in 1 Test match and 5 One Day Internationals for New Zealand in 1995 and 1996. She played domestic cricket for Southern Districts, Wellington and Canterbury.
