= Olivia Magno =

Australian cricketer (born 1972)

Personal information
- Full name: Olivia Jane Magno
- Born: 4 November 1972 (age 54); Darlinghurst, New South Wales
- Batting: Right-handed
- Bowling: Right-arm Leg-spin
- Role: Bowler

International information
- National side: Australia
- Test debut (cap 132): 8 February 1996 v New Zealand
- Last Test: 24 June 2001 v England
- ODI debut (cap 76): 14 February 1995 v New Zealand
- Last ODI: 2 July 2001 v England

Domestic team information
- Years: Team
- 1993/94–1996/97: New South Wales
- 1997/98-2003/04: South Australia
- 2002: Surrey
- 2003: Kent

Career statistics
Competition	Test	ODI	FC	LA
Matches	5	44	13	141
Runs scored	41	258	154	1,438
Batting average	41.00	15.17	25.66	19.17
100s/50s	0/0	0/0	0/1	1/2
Top score	37*	38	65	108
Balls bowled	706	2005	1,440	6,281
Wickets	11	51	26	150
Bowling average	22.72	18.47	17.57	19.15
5 wickets in innings	1	0	2	2
10 wickets in match	0	0	0	0
Best bowling	5/87	4/10	5/15	6/34
Catches/stumpings	4/-	29/–	9/–	74/–
- Source: CricInfo, 4 June 2014

Olivia Jane Magno (born 4 November 1972) is an Australian former cricket player. She played in the Women's National Cricket League for the New South Wales women's cricket team in the 1996/1997 season and for the South Australia Women's cricket team in the 1997/1998 to 2003/2004 seasons. Magno played five tests and 44 One Day Internationals for the Australia national women's cricket team.
