= Trudy Anderson =

New Zealand cricketer (born 1959)

Personal information
- Full name: Trudy Lee Anderson
- Born: 26 August 1959 (age 67); Dunedin, New Zealand
- Batting: Right-handed
- Bowling: Right-arm medium
- Role: Batter

International information
- National side: New Zealand (1993–1997)
- Test debut (cap 101): 7 February 1995 v India
- Last Test: 28 February 1995 v Australia
- ODI debut (cap 60): 13 January 1993 v Australia
- Last ODI: 23 February 1997 v Australia

Domestic team information
- Years: Team
- 1980/81: Auckland
- 1981/82–1984/85: Central Districts
- 1986/87–1996/97: Canterbury

Career statistics
Competition	WTest	WODI	WFC	WLA
Matches	2	26	44	73
Runs scored	108	440	1,874	1,800
Batting average	36.00	17.60	33.46	32.14
100s/50s	0/1	0/2	1/8	2/8
Top score	63	85	151	102
Balls bowled	–	–	976	471
Wickets	–	–	15	16
Bowling average	–	–	22.46	11.93
5 wickets in innings	–	–	0	0
10 wickets in match	–	–	0	0
Best bowling	–	–	4/30	4/19
Catches/stumpings	0/–	9/–	19/–	22/–
- Source: CricketArchive, 28 April 2021

Trudy Lee Anderson (born 26 August 1959) is a New Zealand former cricketer who played as a right-handed batter. She appeared in 2 Test matches and 26 One Day Internationals for New Zealand between 1993 and 1997. She played domestic cricket for Auckland, Central Districts and Canterbury.
