= Kalyani Dhokarikar =

Indian cricketer (born 1971)

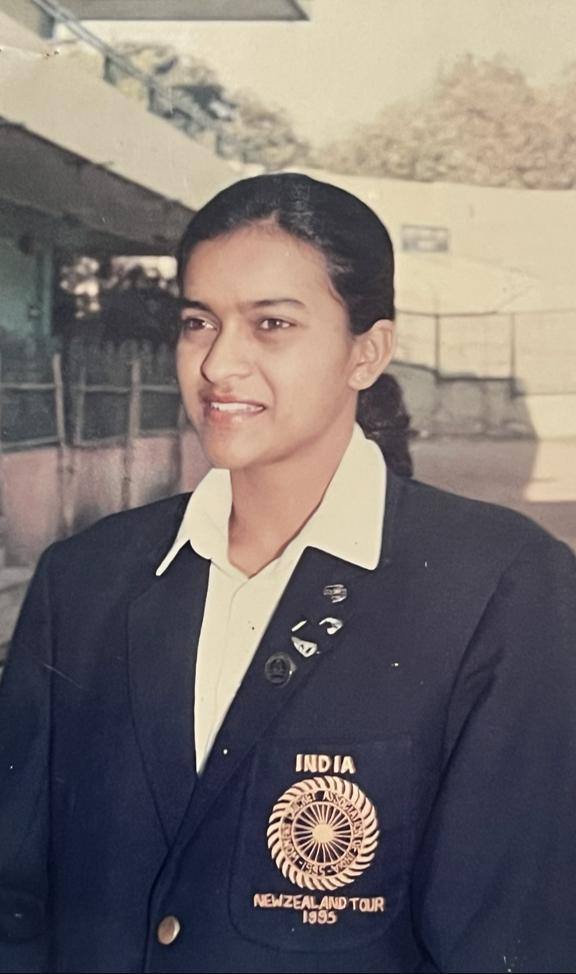
- Kalyani Dhokarikar

Personal information
- Full name: Kalyani Dhokarikar
- Born: 9 May 1971 (age 55); Nagpur, India
- Batting: Right-handed
- Bowling: Right-arm medium-fast
- Role: All-rounder

International information
- National side: India (1995–2000)
- Only Test (cap 48): 15 July 1995 v England
- ODI debut (cap 48): 23 February 1995 v New Zealand
- Last ODI: 11 December 2000 v Ireland

Domestic team information
- Years: Team
- 1982–2000: Maharashtra

Career statistics
Competition	WTest	WODI	WFC	WLA
Matches	1	8	5	38
Runs scored	25	24	113	867
Batting average	25.00	4.80	56.50	41.28
100s/50s	0/0	0/0	0/1	1/8
Top score	21	11	56*	107*
Balls bowled	192	240	432	946
Wickets	2	3	12	31
Bowling average	28.00	39.00	18.58	17.83
5 wickets in innings	0	0	1	0
10 wickets in match	0	0	0	0
Best bowling	1/17	2/20	7/60	4/15
Catches/stumpings	0/–	0/–	0/–	6/–
- Source: CricketArchive, 18 August 2022

Kalyani Dhokarikar, also known as Kalyani Umbrani, (born 9 May 1971) is an Indian former international cricketer. She represented India as an all-rounder, batting right-handed and bowling right-arm fast-medium. During her 18 year cricketing career, she represented India in eight One Day Internationals and one Test match, between 1995 and 2000.

She played in two Cricket World Cups for India, in 1997 in India and 2000 in New Zealand.

== Early life and career ==
Kalyani Dhokarikar was born on 9 May 1971 in the city of Oranges, Nagpur, Maharashtra. Her love of cricket stemmed from her mother Smt. Sandhya's passion for sports; she had played softball in her school and college days.

Dhokarikar started playing cricket at 12 under the guidance of Madhavrao Bapat in Pune, India and in later years with Pradeep Ingle. Her practice ground for the major years of her career was at the Cadence Cricket Academy, Pune.

== Domestic career ==
Kalyani played for her state, Maharashtra, and West Zone in domestic cricket and captained Rest of India against England. During her captainship, Maharashtra won many championships at junior and senior level. She also played a pivotal role for Pune University's cricket team that won two championships.

== International career ==
In 1995, Kalyani made her Women's One Day International debut for India against New Zealand played at Hamilton, as part of the New Zealand Centenary Cup.

She represented India at two World Cups, first in India in 1997 and then in 2000 in New Zealand.

Kalyani played her part in India's ODI series and Test match victories away against England in 1999.
