= Zoe Goss =

Australian cricketer

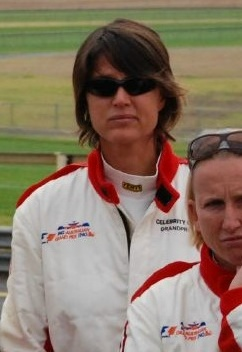

Personal information
- Full name: Zoe Jean Goss
- Born: 6 December 1968 (age 57); Perth, Australia
- Batting: Right-handed
- Bowling: Right-arm medium-fast
- Role: All-rounder

International information
- National side: Australia (1987–2000)
- Test debut (cap 110): 1 August 1987 v England
- Last Test: 8 February 1996 v New Zealand
- ODI debut (cap 54): 18 January 1987 v New Zealand
- Last ODI: 23 December 2000 v New Zealand
- ODI shirt no.: 23

Domestic team information
- Years: Team
- 1984/85–1995/96: Western Australia
- 1996/97–1998/99: Victoria
- 1999/00–2005/06: Western Australia

Career statistics
Competition	WTest	WODI	WFC	WLA
Matches	12	65	34	200
Runs scored	280	1,099	904	5,348
Batting average	23.33	29.70	28.25	35.65
100s/50s	0/0	0/7	0/6	3/41
Top score	48	96*	74	123*
Balls bowled	1,956	2,773	5,125	7,701
Wickets	20	64	77	176
Bowling average	25.55	19.15	17.97	20.19
5 wickets in innings	0	0	4	0
10 wickets in match	0	0	1	0
Best bowling	3/15	4/10	6/24	4/10
Catches/stumpings	1/–	11/–	10/–	51/–
- Source: CricketArchive, 8 January 2023

Zoe Jean Goss OAM (born 6 December 1968) is an Australian former cricketer who played as an all-rounder, bowling right-arm medium-fast and batting right-handed. She appeared in 12 Test matches and 65 One Day Internationals for Australia between 1987 and 2000, including playing at four World Cups. She played domestic cricket for Western Australia and Victoria.

== Biography ==
Goss played her first game of cricket at the age of 11 for South Perth, scoring 36 not out and taking 0 for 15. In the 1985–86 season, at the age of 17, she made her debut for Western Australia. Goss played with Western Australia until 1995–96 when she moved to Victoria. Goss returned to play with WA in 1999–2000.

Goss was first selected in the Australian women's side for the Rose Bowl series against New Zealand in January 1987. Although having already established herself as a genuine fast bowler and a brilliant all-rounder at interstate level, it was not until the following Rose Bowl in January 1988 that she first produced an outstanding performance at international level. In the third match of the series in Wellington, Goss guided Australia to victory with an unbeaten 96, an innings that remained her highest One Day International score.

Goss scored 1099 ODI runs at an average of 29.70 including 7 fifties and took 64 wickets at an average of 19.15, her best bowling being 4 for 10 against Ireland in Christchurch during the 2000 World Cup.

Goss played in four World Cups for Australia, playing when Australia won the final in 1988, then again in their unsuccessful defence in 1993, as a squad member when Australia regained the trophy in 1997 and finally as a member of the Australian side that lost the 2000 final to New Zealand, her final match for Australia.

Goss's performances at Test level were not as impressive, averaging just 23.33 with a highest score of 48 and taking 20 wickets at an average of 25.55.

She was also named Player of the Series in the 1995–96 Australian Women's Cricket Championship and again in the 1996–97 Women's National Cricket League.

Despite her record in women's cricket, Goss's most famous cricketing appearance was in the Bradman Foundation charity match in Sydney in December 1994. Having been called into the Bradman XI side when rugby league player Paul Vautin withdrew due to illness, Goss scored 29 before taking 2 for 60 from her ten overs, including the wicket of Brian Lara who had broken the records for Highest Test Innings and Highest First-Class Innings earlier in the year.

After finishing her international career, Goss later went on to play for Tuart Hill Cricket Club in the WACA Women's Competition.

Goss was awarded the Medal of the Order of Australia in the 2024 Australia Day Honours for service to cricket.
