= Arati Vaidya =

Indian cricketer (born 1970)

Personal information
- Full name: Arati Vaidya
- Born: 2 July 1970 (age 56); Pune, India
- Batting: Left-handed
- Bowling: Left-arm medium
- Role: Batter

International information
- National side: India (1995–1999)
- Test debut (cap 45): 7 February 1995 v New Zealand
- Last Test: 15 July 1999 v England
- ODI debut (cap 47): 12 February 1995 v New Zealand
- Last ODI: 11 November 1995 v England

Domestic team information
- Years: Team
- 1988–1992/93: Maharashtra
- 1993/94: Railways
- 2000/01: Mumbai

Career statistics
Competition	WTest	WODI	WFC	WLA
Matches	3	6	6	56
Runs scored	139	162	192	1,530
Batting average	27.80	27.00	27.42	34.77
100s/50s	0/0	0/1	0/0	0/8
Top score	39	77	39	96*
Balls bowled	30	24	102	45
Wickets	0	1	1	11
Bowling average	–	22.00	31.00	7.60
5 wickets in innings	0	0	0	0
10 wickets in match	0	0	0	0
Best bowling	–	1/11	1/8	4/16
Catches/stumpings	0/–	0/–	1/–	2/–
- Source: CricketArchive, 17 August 2022

Arati Vaidya (born 2 July 1970) is an Indian former cricketer who played as a left-handed batter. She appeared in three Test matches and six One Day Internationals for India from 1995 until 1999. She played domestic cricket for Maharashtra, Railways and Mumbai.
