= Purnima Rau =

Indian cricketer and coach (born 1967)

Personal information
- Full name: Purnima Rau
- Born: 30 January 1967 (age 59); Secunderabad, Andhra Pradesh, India
- Batting: Right-handed
- Bowling: Right-arm off break
- Role: All-rounder

International information
- National side: India (1993–2000)
- Test debut (cap 44): 7 February 1995 v New Zealand
- Last Test: 15 July 1999 v England
- ODI debut (cap 40): 20 July 1993 v West Indies
- Last ODI: 20 December 2000 v New Zealand

Domestic team information
- Years: Team
- 1985/86: Andhra
- 1991/92–1995/96: Railways
- 1993/94: Andhra
- 1996/97–2004/05: Air India

Career statistics
Competition	WTest	WODI	WFC	WLA
Matches	5	33	30	86
Runs scored	123	516	802	1,705
Batting average	15.37	21.50	29.70	28.41
100s/50s	0/0	0/2	0/4	0/9
Top score	33	67*	81	82*
Balls bowled	1,164	1,557	2,614	2,888
Wickets	15	50	77	125
Bowling average	21.26	16.88	13.98	13.22
5 wickets in innings	1	0	4	2
10 wickets in match	0	0	0	0
Best bowling	5/24	4/26	6/29	5/3
Catches/stumpings	1/–	8/–	6/–	15/–
- Source: CricketArchive, 17 August 2022

Purnima Rau (née Janardhan; born 30 January 1967) is an Indian former cricketer and current cricket coach. She played as an all-rounder, batting right-handed and bowling right-arm off break. She appeared in five Test matches and 33 One Day Internationals for India between 1993 and 2000. She played domestic cricket for Andhra, Railways and Air India.

== Playing career ==
Rau made her international debut for India against West Indies in an ODI at Nottingham on 20 July 1993. Her Test debut came against New Zealand at Nelson on 7 February 1995. Rau was described as one of the first Indian women cricketers to attempt to take advantage of the field restrictions in place during the first 15 overs of a limited overs game.

She captained India in 3 Test matches and 8 ODI matches, all in 1995.

In 1996 skipper Rau helped the touring Andhra Pradesh women's cricket team register a 114-run victory over Samudra Ladies CC. She captained Air India in the 1999/00 season.

== Coaching career ==
Rau was head coach of India between 2014 and 2017. Currently, she is a coach associated with development of youth and women's cricketers in Hyderabad.
