= Chanderkanta Kaul =

Indian cricketer (born 1971)

Personal information
- Full name: Chanderkanta Kaul
- Born: 21 January 1971 (age 55); Jalandhar, Punjab, India
- Batting: Right-handed
- Bowling: Right-arm slow
- Role: Batter

International information
- National side: India (1993–2000)
- Test debut (cap 37): 7 February 1995 v New Zealand
- Last Test: 15 July 1999 v England
- ODI debut (cap 35): 20 July 1993 v West Indies
- Last ODI: 20 December 2000 v New Zealand

Domestic team information
- Years: Team
- 1995: Railways
- 2001: Middlesex
- 2007–2008: Middlesex

Career statistics
Competition	WTest	WODI	WFC	WLA
Matches	5	31	6	56
Runs scored	318	616	351	1,491
Batting average	35.33	23.69	31.90	31.06
100s/50s	0/3	0/3	0/3	0/10
Top score	75	80	75	95
Balls bowled	–	–	–	39
Wickets	–	–	–	0
Bowling average	–	–	–	–
5 wickets in innings	–	–	–	–
10 wickets in match	–	–	–	–
Best bowling	–	–	–	–
Catches/stumpings	0/–	4/–	0/–	10/–
- Source: CricketArchive, 12 April 2021

Chanderkanta Kaul (née Chanderkanta Aheer; born 21 January 1971) is an Indian former cricketer who played as a right-handed batter. She appeared in 5 Test matches and 31 One Day Internationals for India between 1993 and 2000, and captained them in 1 Test and 4 ODIs. She played domestic cricket for Middlesex in 2001 as well as in 2007 and 2008.
