= Renu Margrate =

Indian cricketer (born 1975)

Personal information
- Full name: Renuka Margrate
- Born: 3 July 1975 (age 51); Amritsar, India
- Batting: Right-handed
- Bowling: Right-arm medium
- Role: Bowler

International information
- National side: India (1995–2000)
- Test debut (cap 42): 7 February 1995 v New Zealand
- Last Test: 15 July 1999 v England
- ODI debut (cap 45): 12 February 1995 v New Zealand
- Last ODI: 20 December 2000 v New Zealand

Domestic team information
- Years: Team
- 1988: Punjab
- 1996/97–1999/00: Railways
- 2006/07–2009/10: Punjab

Career statistics
| Competition | WTest | WODI | WFC | WLA |
|---|---|---|---|---|
| Matches | 5 | 23 | 20 | 78 |
| Runs scored | 58 | 78 | 554 | 698 |
| Batting average | 14.50 | 7.09 | 32.58 | 16.61 |
| 100s/50s | 0/0 | 0/0 | 1/3 | 0/1 |
| Top score | 27 | 21 | 115* | 97* |
| Balls bowled | 504 | 799 | 858 | 1,345 |
| Wickets | 1 | 10 | 8 | 30 |
| Bowling average | 141.00 | 36.70 | 33.00 | 22.70 |
| 5 wickets in innings | 0 | 0 | 0 | 1 |
| 10 wickets in match | 0 | 0 | 0 | 0 |
| Best bowling | 1/14 | 2/13 | 2/28 | 7/21 |
| Catches/stumpings | 1/– | 4/– | 6/– | 14/– |
- Source: CricketArchive, 17 August 2022

Renuka Margrate (born 3 July 1975) is an Indian former cricketer who played as a right-arm medium bowler. She appeared in five Test matches and 23 One Day Internationals (ODI) for India between 1995 and 2000. She played domestic cricket for Punjab and Railways. She made both her Test and ODI debut in February 1995, both against New Zealand.
