= Anju Jain =

Indian cricketer (born 1974)

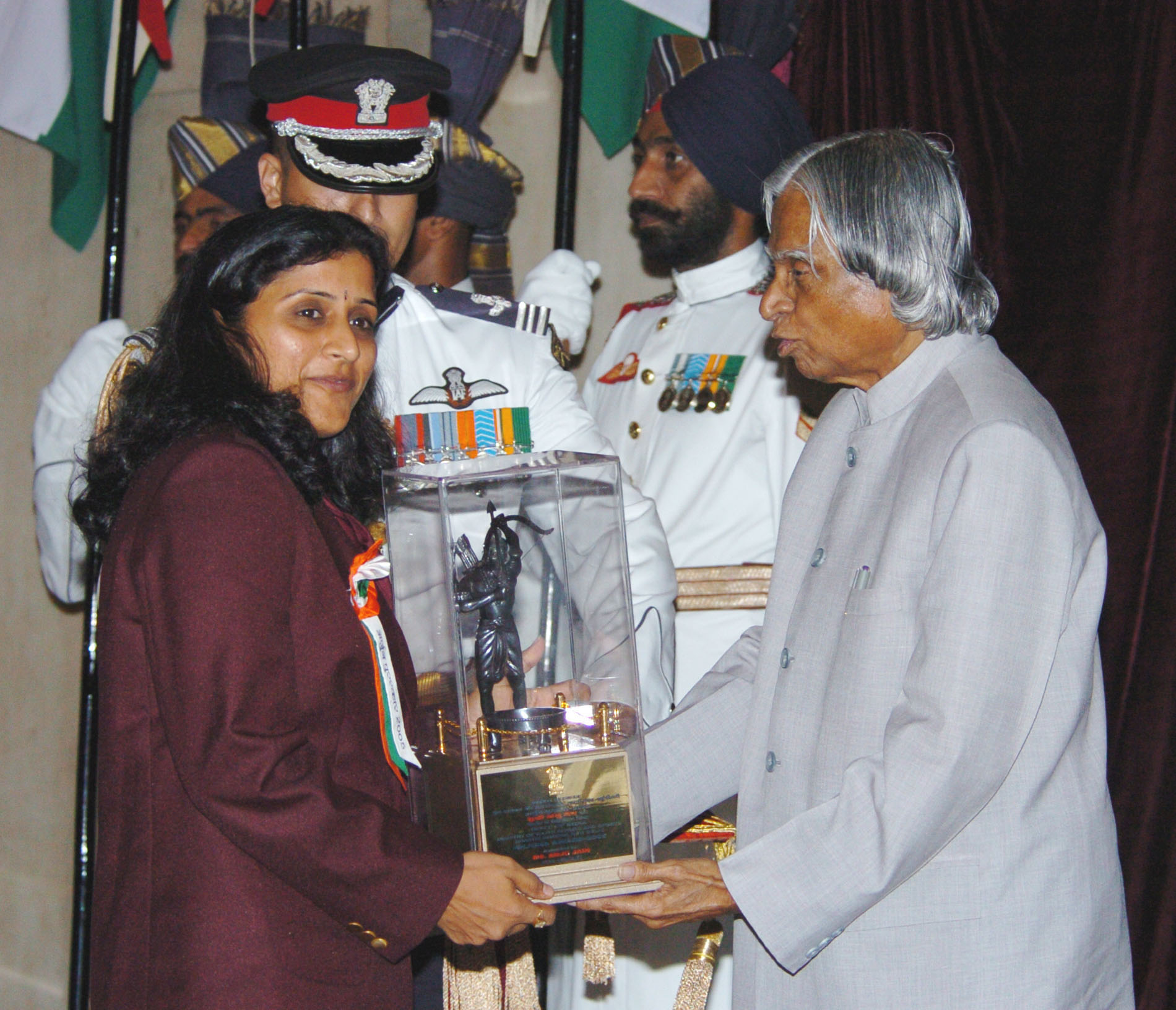
- President A.P.J. Abdul Kalam presenting the 2005 Arjuna Award to Anju Jain in 2006

Personal information
- Full name: Anju Jain
- Born: 11 August 1974 (age 52); Delhi, India
- Batting: Right-handed
- Bowling: Right-arm off break
- Role: Wicket-keeper

International information
- National side: India (1993–2005)
- Test debut (cap 41): 7 February 1995 v New Zealand
- Last Test: 27 November 2003 v New Zealand
- ODI debut (cap 38): 20 July 1993 v West Indies
- Last ODI: 10 April 2005 v Australia

Domestic team information
- Years: Team
- 1992/93–1993/94: Delhi
- 1993/94–2004/05: Air India

Career statistics
Competition	WTest	WODI	WFC	WLA
Matches	8	65	25	124
Runs scored	441	1,729	1,028	3,798
Batting average	36.75	29.81	33.16	35.16
100s/50s	1/3	0/12	2/5	0/29
Top score	110	90	140*	90
Catches/stumpings	15/8	30/51	24/17	49/69
Medal record
Representing India
Women's cricket
World Cup
Runner-up	2005 South Africa

Anju Jain (born 11 August 1974) is an Indian former cricketer and current cricket coach. She played as a wicket-keeper and right-handed batter. She appeared in eight Test matches and 65 One Day Internationals for India between 1993 and 2005. She played domestic cricket for Delhi and Air India. She has previously coached the India and Bangladesh national women's teams, and currently coaches on the Indian domestic circuit.

== Playing career ==
She captained India at the 2000 World Cup, where the team reached the semi-finals before losing to New Zealand.

She holds jointly with English cricketer SJ Taylor the record for the most stumpings in WODIs, with 51. Jain played seven WODIs as captain, wicket-keeper and opening batter, a record.

Anju received the Arjuna Award in 2005 for her sporting achievements from then President of India Dr. APJ Abdul Kalam.

== Coaching career ==
Since retiring, Jain has coached Odisha, Tripura, Assam, Vidarbha and Baroda at domestic level.

Between 2011 and 2013, she was the head coach of India, and between 2018 and 2020 the head coach of Bangladesh.
