= Neetu David =

Indian cricketer (born 1977)

Personal information
- Full name: Neetu Lawrence David
- Born: 1 September 1977 (age 49); Kanpur, Uttar Pradesh, India
- Batting: Right-handed
- Bowling: Slow left-arm orthodox
- Role: Bowler

International information
- National side: India (1995–2008)
- Test debut (cap 39): 7 February 1995 v New Zealand
- Last Test: 18 February 2006 v England
- ODI debut (cap 43): 12 February 1995 v New Zealand
- Last ODI: 7 September 2008 v England

Domestic team information
- Years: Team
- 1992/93–1994/95: Uttar Pradesh
- 1996/97–2012/13: Railways

Career statistics
Competition	WTest	WODI	WFC	WLA
Matches	10	97	38	205
Runs scored	25	74	39	104
Batting average	6.25	4.93	6.50	6.11
100s/50s	0/0	0/0	0/0	0/0
Top score	11	18*	11	29*
Balls bowled	2,662	4,892	4,965	9,424
Wickets	41	141	115	330
Bowling average	18.90	16.34	13.67	12.78
5 wickets in innings	1	2	6	5
10 wickets in match	0	0	1	0
Best bowling	8/53	5/20	8/53	5/3
Catches/stumpings	4/–	21/–	11/–	40/–
Medal record
Representing India
Women's cricket
World Cup
Runner-up	2005 South Africa
- Source: CricketArchive, 15 August 2022

Neetu Lawrence David (born 1 September 1977) is an Indian former cricketer and former chairperson of the selection panel of the India women's cricket team. She played as a slow left-arm orthodox bowler. She appeared in 10 Test matches and 97 One Day Internationals for India between 1995 and 2008. She played domestic cricket for Uttar Pradesh and Railways.

David holds the record for the best bowling figures in a Women's Test innings, taking 8/53 against England in the second innings in November 1995. Her bowling figures were 9/90 in the match, which India ended up losing by two runs. These are the best bowling figures in a Women's Test match while ending up on the losing side. She is India's fourth-highest all-time wicket-taker in WTest cricket, and second-highest all-time wicket-taker for India in WODI cricket. She was also the first Indian bowler to 100 WODI wickets.

David announced her retirement from international cricket after the 2006 Rani Jhansi Trophy, with match winning figures of 3/19 for Railways against Air India in the final. But she reversed the decision in 2008, subsequently being picked in India's Asia Cup squad. She played her last international match on India's tour of England in 2008. She played her final domestic match in 2013, winning the final of the 2012–13 Senior Women's T20 League with Railways.

In September 2020, David's appointment as the chairperson of India's women's national selection panel was announced. She was Included in the ICC Cricket Hall of Fame 2024.
