= 1930 in New Zealand =

- Decades: 1910s; 1920s; 1930s; 1940s; 1950s
- See also: History of New Zealand; List of years in New Zealand; Timeline of New Zealand history

The following lists events that happened during 1930 in New Zealand.

== Population ==
- Estimated population as of 31 December: 1,506,800.
- Increase since previous 31 December 1929: 20,700 (1.39%).
- Males per 100 females: 103.9.

== Incumbents ==
=== Regal and viceregal ===
- Head of state – George V
- Governor-General – General Sir Charles Fergusson Bt GCMG KCB DSO MVO succeeded the same year by The Lord Bledisloe GCMG KBE PC

=== Government ===
The 23rd New Zealand Parliament continued with the United Party in power.

- Speaker of the House – Charles Statham (Independent)
- Prime Minister – Sir Joseph Ward (United) until 28 May, then George Forbes (United)
- Minister of Finance – Joseph Ward (United) until 28 May, then George Forbes (United)
- Minister of Foreign Affairs – Joseph Ward (United) until 28 May, then George Forbes (United).
- Attorney-General – Thomas Sidey (United) until 22 September, then William Downie Stewart
- Chief Justice — Sir Michael Myers

=== Parliamentary opposition ===
- Leader of the Opposition – Gordon Coates (Reform).

=== Main centre leaders ===
- Mayor of Auckland – George Baildon
- Mayor of Wellington – George Troup
- Mayor of Christchurch – John Archer
- Mayor of Dunedin – Robert Black

== Events ==
- 11 August – Palmerston North is proclaimed as a city.
- August – The Atmore Report on the education system is presented.
- 4 November – Phar Lap wins the Melbourne Cup.

== Arts and literature ==
See 1930 in art, 1930 in literature, Category:1930 books

- Kowhai Gold, an anthology of New Zealand poetry edited by Quentin Pope published in London and New York

=== Music ===
See: 1930 in music

=== Radio ===
See: Public broadcasting in New Zealand

=== Film ===
- 3 January: The Coubray-tone News- the first New-Zealand made "talkies" (film with sound) – premiered.
- The Romance of Maoriland

See: Category:1930 film awards, 1930 in film, List of New Zealand feature films, Cinema of New Zealand, Category:1930 films

== Sport ==
=== British Empire Games ===
Gold	Silver	Bronze	Total
3	4	2	9

=== Chess ===
The 39th National Chess Championship was held in Wanganui, and was won by G. Gunderson of Melbourne.

=== Cricket ===
- New Zealand's first ever Test matches, a home series of four three-day games against England. Series won 1–0 by England
  - 10,11,13 January Lancaster Park, Christchurch. New Zealand (112 and 131) lost by eight Wickets to England (181 and 66/2).
  - 24,25,27 January Basin Reserve, Wellington. New Zealand (440 and 164/4dec.) drew with England (320 and 107/4).
  - 14,15,17 February Eden Park, Auckland. England (330/4dec.) drew with New Zealand (96/1) (First two days were abandoned due to rain).
  - 21,22,24 February at Eden Park: England (540 and 22/3) drew with New Zealand (387) – this fourth Test was arranged due to the rain washout of the third test.

=== Golf ===
- The 20th New Zealand Open championship was won by Andrew Shaw, his third title.
- The 34th National Amateur Championships were held in the Manawatu district
  - Men: H.A. Black (Mirimar)
  - Women: Miss O. Kay

=== Horse racing ===
==== Harness racing ====
- New Zealand Trotting Cup – Wrackler
- Auckland Trotting Cup – Carmel

==== Thoroughbred racing ====
- New Zealand Cup – Nightmarch
- Avondale Gold Cup – Prodice
- Auckland Cup – Motere
- Wellington Cup – Concentrate
- New Zealand Derby – Cylinder

=== Lawn bowls ===
The national outdoor lawn bowls championships are held in Dunedin.

- Men's singles champion – F. Lambeth (Balmacewen Bowling Club)
- Men's pair champions – G.L. Gladding, H. Jenkins (skip) (Carlton Bowling Club)
- Men's fours champions – E.S. Wilson, L.C. Buist, J. Dowland, D.M. Stuart (skip) (St Kilda Bowling Club)

=== Rugby union ===
Category:Rugby union in New Zealand, Category:All Blacks

- Ranfurly Shield

=== Rugby league ===
New Zealand national rugby league team

=== Soccer ===
- 1930 Chatham Cup won by Petone
- Provincial league champions:
  - Auckland: YMCA
  - Canterbury: Thistle
  - Hawke's Bay: Whakatu
  - Nelson: Thistle
  - Otago: Seacliff
  - Southland: Corinthians
  - Taranaki: Caledonian
  - Waikato: Pukemiro
  - Wanganui: KP's
  - Wellington: Hospital

== Births ==
=== January ===
- 3 January – Ruth Dowman, athlete
- 8 January – Dave Spence, cricketer
- 21 January – Peter Tapsell, politician
- 24 January – Terence Bayler, actor
- 27 January – Bob O'Dea, rugby union player

=== February ===
- 10 February
  - Russell Kerr, ballet dancer, choreographer and producer
  - Malcolm McCaw, cricketer, accountant
- 11 February – Bruce Cathie, pilot, author
- 17 February – Jonathan Bennett, philosopher
- 20 February
  - Kevin Meates, rugby union player
  - Vida Stout, limnographer
- 21 February – Joan Metge, social anthropologist
- 22 February – Ivan Mercep, architect

=== March ===
- 5 March – Brian Bell, ornithologist
- 9 March – Mina Foley, opera singer
- 20 March – Thomas Williams, Roman Catholic cardinal
- 25 March – Margery Blackman, weaver
- 27 March – Paul Cotton, diplomat
- 28 March – Helmer Pedersen, sailor
- 30 March – Charlie Steele Jr., association football player, rugby union player
- 31 March – Barry Mitcalfe, poet, anti-nuclear activist

=== April ===
- 1 April – Dennis Young, rugby union player
- 3 April – Marama Martin, television and radio broadcaster
- 5 April – Bill Tinnock, rower
- 7 April – Koro Dewes, Ngāti Porou kaumātua and Māori language advocate
- 8 April
  - David Benney, applied mathematician
  - Ivan Vodanovich, rugby union player, coach and administrator
  - Neil Wilson, athlete
- 18 April – Clive Revill, singer, actor
- 19 April
  - Reg Douglas, rower
  - Ewan Jamieson, military leader
- 20 April – Helen Mackenzie, swimmer

=== May ===
- 13 May – Richard Kearney, jurist
- 20 May – Alexia Pickering, disabilities rights campaigner
- 21 May – Keith Davis, rugby union player
- 24 May – Ivor Richardson, jurist
- 30 May – Colleen Dewe, politician

=== June ===
- 1 June – Matt Poore, cricketer
- 7 June – Ian Leggat, cricketer
- 15 June – Bev Brewis, high jumper
- 25 June – Peter Wight, cricketer

=== July ===
- 3 July – Kihi Ngatai, Ngāi Te Rangi leader, horticulturalist
- 11 July
  - Jack Alabaster, cricketer
  - Guy McGregor, field hockey player
- 25 July – Murray Chapple, cricketer
- 30 July – David Weston, cricketer

=== August ===
- 1 August – Glen Rowling, community leader, spouse of the prime minister Bill Rowling
- 2 August – Mick Bremner, rugby union player and administrator
- 5 August – Bruce Turner, field hockey player, cricketer
- 12 August – Brian Molloy, rugby union player, plant ecologist, conservationist
- 15 August
  - Leo T. McCarthy, politician
  - Azalea Sinclair, netball player
- 18 August
  - Graeme Dallow, police officer
  - Denis McLean, diplomat, author
- 20 August – Robert Smellie, lawyer and judge
- 21 August – Cyril Eastlake, rugby league player
- 28 August – Tony Small, diplomat
- 30 August – Noel Harford, cricketer

=== September ===
- 3 September – Cherry Wilder, fantasy and science-fiction writer
- 6 September – David Simmons, ethnologist
- 10 September – Pauline Engel, educator
- 11 September – Kenneth Minogue, political theorist
- 19 September
  - Robin Archer, rugby union player
  - Volker Heine, physicist
- 22 September – John Hill, cricketer
- 28 September – Sel Belsham, rugby league player
- 29 September – Jocelyn Fish, politician, women's rights campaigner
- 30 September – George Menzies, rugby league player

=== October ===
- 1 October – Bob Jolly, veterinary academic
- 17 October – Joan Williamson-Orr, local-body politician
- 21 October – Lawrence Reade, cricketer
- 22 October – Lois McIvor, artist
- 29 October – Hugh Burry, rugby union player, medical academic

=== November ===
- 11 November – Ian Burrows, army officer
- 16 November – Merv Richards, pole vaulter, gymnastics and pole vault coach
- 17 November – Chic Littlewood, television entertainer, actor
- 20 November – James Hill, rower
- 22 November – Bill Lambert, politician
- 30 November – Leonard Boyle, Roman Catholic bishop

=== December ===
- 6 December – Natalie Wicken, netball player
- 16 December
  - Alan Clark, cricketer
  - Harry Turbott, architect, landscape architect
- 23 December – Jean Stewart, swimmer
- 27 December – John Drawbridge, artist
- 31 December – Ron Johnston, motorcycle speedway rider

=== Undated ===
- Daphne Walker, singer

== Deaths ==
=== January–February ===
- 6 January – Walter Harper, Anglican clergyman (born 1848)
- 9 January – Joseph Harkness, politician (born 1850)
- 11 January – Eru Tumutara, Ringatū bishop (born c.1859)
- 24 January
  - Ellen Crowe, community leader (born c.1847)
  - Sophia Taylor, suffragist (born 1847)
  - Herman van Staveren, rabbi, philanthropist (born 1849)
- 25 January – Pat Hickey, trade union leader (born 1882)
- 5 February – John Holland Baker, surveyor, public servant (born 1841)
- 11 February – Anne Wilson, poet, novelist (born 1848)
- 12 February – Elizabeth Fergusson, nurse, midwife (born 1867)
- 14 February – Sir Thomas Mackenzie, politician, Prime Minister of New Zealand (1912) (born 1853)
- 21 February – Charles Garrard, cricketer, school inspector (born 1868)

=== March–April ===
- 4 March – Henry Michel, politician (born 1855)
- 11 March – George Edgecumbe, newspaper proprietor, businessman (born 1845)
- 5 April – Wereta Tainui Pitama, Ngāi Tahu leader, politician (born 1881)
- 10 April – John McCaw, farmer (born 1849)
- 16 April – Makereti Papakura, tour guide, entertainer, ethnographer (born 1873)

=== May–June ===
- 20 May – Adelaide Hicks, midwife (born 1845)
- 29 May – William Charles Nation, spiritualist, Arbor Day advocate (born 1840)
- 30 May – William Chatfield, architect (born 1851)
- 26 June – Frederick Cooke, trade unionist, politician (born 1867)
- 27 June – Sir Māui Pōmare, doctor, politician (born c.1875)

=== July–August ===
- 3 July – Tom Cross, rugby union and rugby league player (born 1876)
- 8 July – Sir Joseph Ward, politician, Prime Minister of New Zealand (1906–12, 1928–30) (born 1856)
- 19 July – Sir Robert Stout, politician, Premier of New Zealand (1884, 1884–87) (born 1844)
- 24 July – Alfred Philpott, museum curator, entomologist (born 1870)
- 30 July – George Hutchison, politician (born 1846)
- 10 August – Bill Hawkins, cricketer, politician (born 1861)
- 15 August – Wesley Spragg, butter manufacturer, temperance campaigner, benefactor (born 1848)
- 18 August – James Flesher, politician, mayor of Christchurch (1923–25) (born 1865)
- 20 August – George Hunter, politician, racehorse breeder (born 1859)
- 27 August
  - Emily Hill, schoolteacher, suffragist, temperance worker (born 1847)
  - Robert Neill, cricketer (born 1864)

=== September–October ===
- 4 September
  - George Duncan, mining and tramway engineer (born 1852)
  - Thomas Hickman, police officer (born 1848)
- 9 September – Alexander Bathgate, lawyer, businessman, writer, conservationist (born 1845)
- 11 September – William Parker, cricketer (born 1862)
- 24 September – Harry McNish, carpenter, Antarctic explorer (born 1874)
- 1 October
  - Marjory Nicholls, poet, drama producer (born 1890)
  - Hoeroa Tiopira, rugby union player (born 1871)
- 5 October – Frederick Fitchett, politician (born 1851)
- 13 October – Alfred George, newspaper proprietor (born 1854)
- 14 October – Thomas Fleming, miller (born 1848)
- 17 October – Amelia Randall, community leader, businesswoman, benefactor (born 1844)
- 21 October – Frank McNeill, cricketer (born 1877)
- 27 October – Francis Watson, cricketer (born 1860)
- 29 October – George Ewing, cricketer (born 1851)

=== November–December ===
- 1 November – Heni Materoa Carroll, Te Aitanga-a-Māhaki leader (born c.1854)
- 3 November – Nellie Ferner, artist photographer, community leader (born 1869)
- 8 November – Robert Scott, railway engineer, academic (born 1861)
- 12 November – Crawford Anderson, politician (born c.1848)
- 7 December – John Barr, politician (born 1867)
- 15 December – Cecil de Lautour, politician (born 1845)
- 17 December – Arthur O'Callaghan, politician (born 1837)
- 29 December – Otene Paora, Ngāti Whātua leader, Anglican lay reader, land negotiator (born c.1870)

== See also ==
- List of years in New Zealand
- Timeline of New Zealand history
- History of New Zealand
- Military history of New Zealand
- Timeline of the New Zealand environment
- Timeline of New Zealand's links with Antarctica
