= Duncan Drew =

New Zealand cricketer (born 1976)

Personal information
- Full name: Duncan John Drew
- Born: 11 November 1976 (age 50); Oamaru, New Zealand
- Batting: Right-handed
- Role: Wicketkeeper-batsman

Domestic team information
- Years: Team
- 2000/01–2001/02: Otago
- Source: ESPNcricinfo, 24 January 2020

Duncan Drew (born 11 November 1976) is a New Zealand cricketer. He played four first-class matches for Otago between 2000 and 2002.

Drew is a wicketkeeper-batsman who has worked as a physiotherapist. He has played Hawke Cup cricket for North Otago since 1994, and in January 2020 he became North Otago's highest run-scorer. In 2010 he scored 102 of the first innings total of 207 when North Otago won the Hawke Cup for the first time by beating Manawatu. In 2016 he again top-scored in the first innings, this time with 45, when North Otago beat Buller to win the Cup for the second time.
