= Norman McKenzie =

New Zealand cricketer (born 1946)

Personal information
- Full name: Norman Wills McKenzie
- Born: 7 May 1946 (age 80); Kurow, North Otago, New Zealand
- Batting: Right-handed
- Bowling: Slow left-arm orthodox
- Role: Batsman
- Relatives: Marcel McKenzie (son)

Domestic team information
- Years: Team
- 1969/70–1982/83: North Otago
- 1972/73: Otago
- Source: ESPNcricinfo, 15 May 2016

Norman McKenzie (born 7 May 1946) is a New Zealand former cricketer. He played two first-class matches for Otago during the 1972–73 season.

McKenzie was born at Kurow in North Otago in 1946. He played cricket for North Otago teams from the 1961–62 season before playing B team and age-group cricket for Otago from 1966–67. He made the North Otago Hawke Cup team in 1969–70 and made his two senior representative appearances for Otago in the team's final two Plunket Shield matches of the 1971–72 season. A score of 63 not out in his first match against Northern Districts in early January 1972 saw McKenzie retained in the team for the following match against Wellington when he recorded a duck in the only other innings in which he batted.

Despite playing for the Otago B team in early 1977, McKenzie played no more first-class cricket. He played regularly for North Otago until the end of the 1982–83 season before moving to Christchurch during the late 1990s. His son, Marcel McKenzie, played first-class cricket for Canterbury and Otago between 1998–99 and 2007–08.
