= Counties Manukau cricket team =

New Zealand cricket team

Personnel
- Owner: Counties Manukau Cricket

Team information
- Founded: 1996
- Home ground: Weymouth Oval, Manurewa

History
- Hawke Cup wins: 1
- Official website: Counties Manukau Cricket

The Counties Manukau cricket team represents the southern part of the Auckland Region, including the Auckland outer suburbs of Manurewa, Manukau and Papakura and the surrounding rural areas, and including Tuakau in the Waikato region. It is one of the 21 teams from around New Zealand that compete in the Hawke Cup. Its base is at Bruce Pulman Park, Takanini. Most of its home matches have been played at Weymouth Oval in Manurewa.

Teams that previously represented the area in the Hawke Cup were Franklin (1957 to 1977) and Counties (1979 to 1994). Counties Manukau began playing in 1996.

== History ==
=== Franklin and Counties teams ===
Cricket was played in the region in the late 1850s, and possibly earlier. The Mauku Cricket Club, which still competes at senior level, was established in 1859. There was a Franklin Cricket Association in the 1890s and 1900s, and the Warin Cup was instituted for competition between the region's clubs beginning with the 1911–12 season. The Association lapsed but was revived in 1921.

Franklin, based in Pukekohe, was a part of the Auckland team's region until 1957, when the Franklin Cricket Association was affiliated with the New Zealand Cricket Council, entitling it to field a team in the Hawke Cup. By this new affiliation Franklin also became a constituent association of the Northern Districts team, which had begun competing in the Plunket Shield in 1956–57. Franklin competed for the first time in the Hawke Cup in December 1957, and continued doing so until 1977. In 1969-70 Philip Havill became the first Franklin player to represent Northern Districts in first-class cricket.

Franklin were succeeded by Counties, also based in Pukekohe, who competed in the Hawke Cup from 1979 to 1994. In their first season they were captained by the Test batsman John Wright. Neither Franklin nor Counties ever won the title.

=== Counties Manukau ===
The Counties Manukau Cricket Association was established in 1996. Counties Manukau first challenged for the Hawke Cup in 2011–12. Captained by Luke Williamson, they won the title in the first challenge match of 2017-18 when they beat Bay of Plenty. They held the title against challenges from Taranaki and Canterbury Country at Weymouth Oval in Manurewa, before losing the last match of the season to Southland.

Counties Manukau and the other five Northern Districts association teams also compete each season in two-day matches for the Fergus Hickey Rosebowl. The winner has the right to challenge for the Hawke Cup. Counties Manukau also compete in the Brian Dunning Cup, the 50-over competition among the six Northern Districts teams.

== Clubs ==
In the Counties Manukau Cricket Association, 12 clubs compete for the Warin Cup (overall champions), the W. H. Taylor Shield (two-day matches), the Duthie Cup (one-day matches) and the Inder-Lynch Trophy (T20 matches): Clevedon, Glenbrook-Maramarua, Karaka, Manukau City, Mauku, Papakura, Pohutukawa Coast, Pukekohe Metro, Tuakau, United, Waiuku and Weymouth.
