= Ferner =

Ferner is a surname. Notable people with the surname include:

- Diethelm Ferner (1941–2023), German football player and coach
- Finn Ferner (1920–2001), Norwegian sailor
- Hans-Peter Ferner (born 1956), German middle-distance runner
- Johan Ferner (1927–2015), Norwegian sailor
- Mark Ferner (born 1965), Canadian ice hockey player
- Max Ferner (1881–1940), German playwright, born Maximilian Sommer
- Mike Ferner, American politician, author, and peace activist from Ohio
- Nellie Ferner (1869–1930), New Zealand artist, photographer and community leader
- Per Arne Ferner (born 1985), Norwegian jazz guitarist, bands including Flux and Ferner/Juliusson Duo
- Princess Astrid, Mrs. Ferner (1932–2026), second daughter of King Olav V of Norway (1903–1991)
- Rosalie Ferner, neurologist

== Given name ==
- Ferner Nuhn (1903–1989), American author, literary critic, and artist from Iowa

== See also ==
- FERN
- Fener
- Fern
- Fernery
