= Elizabeth Fergusson =

Elizabeth Fergusson may refer to:

- Elizabeth Graeme Fergusson (1737–1801), American poet and writer
- Elizabeth Fergusson (nurse) (1867–1930), New Zealand nurse, midwife and poultry farmer
