= Thomas Hickman =

Thomas Hickman may refer to:

- Thomas Hickman (policeman) (1848–1930), New Zealand policeman
- Thomas Alexander Hickman (1925–2016), Canadian lawyer, politician and judge
- T. E. Hickman (Thomas Edgecumbe Hickman, 1859–1930), British Army officer and politician
