= Tommy Clout =

New Zealand cricketer (born 1993)

Personal information
- Full name: Thomas Neville Clout
- Born: 16 October 1993 (age 32); Tauranga, New Zealand
- Batting: Right-handed
- Bowling: Left-arm medium-fast

Domestic team information
- Years: Team
- 2012/13–2017/18: Bay of Plenty
- 2018/19–2019/20: Otago
- Source: Cricinfo, 27 February 2024

Tommy Clout (born 16 October 1993) is a New Zealand cricketer. He made his first-class debut for Otago in the 2018–19 Plunket Shield season on 21 February 2019. He made his List A debut on 26 January 2020, for Otago in the 2019–20 Ford Trophy.

Clout is also a barrister and solicitor of the High Court of New Zealand, having been admitted to the bar in 2017.
