= Mike Wright (cricketer) =

New Zealand cricketer

Personal information
- Full name: Michael John Edward Wright
- Born: 17 January 1950 (age 76); Whangārei, New Zealand
- Batting: Left-handed
- Role: Wicketkeeper-batsman

Domestic team information
- Years: Team
- 1972/73–1983/84: Northern Districts

Career statistics
Competition	First-class	List A
Matches	65	26
Runs scored	2,632	398
Batting average	25.30	17.30
100s/50s	1/10	0/2
Top score	115	54
Balls bowled	167	–
Wickets	0	–
Bowling average	–	–
5 wickets in innings	–	–
10 wickets in match	–	–
Best bowling	–	–
Catches/stumpings	110/17	33/6
- Source: Cricinfo, 10 September 2017

Michael John Edward Wright (born 17 January 1950) is a former New Zealand cricketer who played first-class cricket for Northern Districts from 1973 to 1984.

A wicket-keeper, Wright was also an opening batsman, scoring 115 and 45 for Northern Districts against Auckland in 1982–83. He also played Hawke Cup cricket for Bay of Plenty from 1969 to 1988, and was named as the wicket-keeper in the Hawke Cup Team of the Century in 2011. In all for Bay of Plenty he played 102 matches and scored 3950 runs, a record for the team.
