= Roger Pierce =

Roger Pierce may refer to:

- Roger D. Pierce (born 1951), United States diplomat
- Roger Pierce (cricketer) (born 1952), New Zealand cricketer
