= Doug Bowden =

New Zealand cricketer (1927–2021)

Personal information
- Full name: Douglas William Bowden
- Born: 19 July 1927; Palmerston North, New Zealand
- Died: 20 January 2021 (aged 93); Taupō, New Zealand
- Batting: Left-handed

Domestic team information
- Years: Team
- 1950/51–1957/58: Central Districts

Career statistics
Competition	First-class
Matches	16
Runs scored	475
Batting average	16.96
100s/50s	0/1
Top score	60
Catches/stumpings	9/–
- Source: Cricinfo, 2 February 2018

Douglas William Bowden (19 July 1927 – 20 January 2021) was a New Zealand cricketer who played first-class cricket for Central Districts in New Zealand from 1950 to 1957.

== Career ==
Bowden was born in Palmerston North and attended Palmerston North Boys' High School, where he captained the first XI in 1945. He opened the batting with Ted Meuli in Central Districts' inaugural first-class match, at the start of the 1950–51 season, but was not successful. He next played in 1953–54, when Central Districts won the Plunket Shield for the first time, then played most of Central Districts' matches until 1957–58. His only fifty came in 1953–54, when he made 60, adding 103 for the second wicket with John Guy, in the victory over Canterbury.

He also played in the Hawke Cup for Manawatu from 1945–46 to 1957–58, and for Bay of Plenty in 1963–64. He set a Manawatu record in a Hawke Cup elimination match in 1953–54 when he scored 234 in 348 minutes to help Manawatu overtake Hawke's Bay's first innings total of 492.

He worked in insurance for North Island Motor Union. He died in Taupō, where he was living with his wife Christina, on 20 January 2021, aged 93. At the time, he was Central Districts' oldest surviving player.
