= 1930 in poetry =

Nationality words link to articles with information on the nation's poetry or literature (for instance, Irish or France).

== Events ==
- Samuel Minturn Peck becomes first Poet Laureate of Alabama, a title created for him.

== Works published ==
=== Canada ===
- Alfred Bailey, Tao: A Ryerson Poetry Chap Book, (Ryerson).
- Wilson MacDonald, Caw-Caw Ballads Montclair, NJ: Pine Tree Publishing.
- E. J. Pratt:
  - The Roosevelt and the Antinoe, Toronto: Macmillan.
  - Verses of the Sea, Toronto: Macmillan. intr. by Charles G.D. Roberts.
- W. W. E. Ross, Laconics.

=== United Kingdom ===
- Richard Aldington, editor, Imagist Anthology
- An Anthology of War Poems, compiled by Frederick Brereton
- W. H. Auden, Poems, his first published book (accepted by T. S. Eliot on behalf of Faber & Faber, which remains Auden's publisher for the rest of his life)
- Samuel Beckett, Whoroscope, his first separately published work; Irish poet published in France
- Julian Bell, Winter Movement
- Hilaire Belloc, New Canterbury Tales, illustrated by Nicholas Bentley
- Edmund Blunden, The Poems of Edmund Blunden
- Basil Bunting, Redimiculum Matellarum, his first book of poems, published in Milan
- Roy Campbell, South African native published in the United Kingdom:
  - Adamastor
  - Poems
- Catherine Carswell, The Life of Robert Burns, biography
- Elizabeth Daryush, Verses
- T. S. Eliot:
  - Ash Wednesday
  - Marina
  - Translator (and writer of the introduction), Anabasis, translation from the original French of Saint-John Perse's Anabase 1924; London: Faber
- William Empson, Seven Types of Ambiguity, a book of criticism
- Stella Gibbons, The Mountain Beast, and Other Poems
- Gerard Manley Hopkins, Poems of Gerard Manley Hopkins, edited by Charles Williams (see also Poems 1918)
- Brian Howard, God Save the King
- D. H. Lawrence (both posthumous):
  - Nettles
  - The Triumph of the Machine
- Hugh MacDiarmid, pen name of Christopher Murray Grieve, To Circumjack Cencrastus; or, The Curly Snake, written and published in English and Scots
- 'Æ', pen name of George William Russell, Enchantment, and Other Poems
- Edith Sitwell, Collected Poems
- Stephen Spender, Twenty Poems
- Katharine Tynan, Collected Poems
- Humbert Wolfe, The Uncelestial City
- D. B. Wyndham-Lewis and Charles Lee, compilers, The Stuffed Owl: an anthology of bad verse

=== United States ===
- W. H. Auden, Poems
- Hart Crane, The Bridge
- Babette Deutsch, Fire for the Night
- Richard Eberhart, A Bravery of Earth
- Robert Frost, Collected Poems
- Horace Gregory, Chelsea Rooming House
- Stanley J. Kunitz, Intellectual Things
- William Ellery Leonard, This Midland City
- Archibald MacLeish, New Found Land
- Edgar Lee Masters, Leechee Nuts
- Ezra Pound, A Draft of XXX Cantos, American poet writing in Europe
- Lizette Woodworth Reese, White April
- Edwin Arlington Robinson, The Glory of the Nightingales
- Allen Tate, Three Poems
- Sara Teasdale, Stars To-night
- Yvor Winters, The Proof

=== Other in English ===
- Samuel Beckett, Whoroscope, Irish writer published in the United Kingdom
- Una Marson, Tropic Reveries, the first "noted" collection of poems by a West Indian woman
- Brian O'Nolan, "Ad Astra", in Blackrock College Annual, Irish writer (his first published work)
- Quentin Pope, editor, Kowhai Gold, anthology of New Zealand poetry (published in London & New York)

== Works published in other languages ==
=== France ===
- René Char, Ralentir travaux
- Paul Claudel, Le Soulier de satin, France
- Michel Deguy, French academic, essayist, translator and poet
- Robert Desnos, Corps et biens: poemes 1919–1929
- Léon-Paul Fargue, Sous la lampe
- Henri Michaux, Un Certain Plume ("A Person Called Plume"), in which the character Plume, a symbolic, alienated underdog, first appears
- Pierre Reverdy, Pierres blanches
- Jules Supervielle, Le Forçat innocent

=== Indian subcontinent ===
Including all of the British colonies that later became India, Pakistan, Bangladesh, Sri Lanka and Nepal. Listed alphabetically by first name, regardless of surname:

- Ananta Pattanayak, Raktasikha, Oriya-language
- Dimbeshwar Neog, Indradhanu, Assamese-language
- Kazi Nazrul Islam, translator, Rubaiyat-i-Haphij, translated from the Persian quatrains of the poet Shiraji Hafiz into Bengali
- Laxmi Prasad Devkota, Muna Madan, मुनामदन, Nepali
- Maraimalai Atikal, Manikkavacakar Varalarum Kalamum, a two-volume study of Manikkavacakar, a saint-poet of the Saivaite sect, in Tamil; criticism
- Mathuranatha Shastri, adaptor, Sahitya-Vaibhava, various Hindi poems translated into Sanskrit and adapted
- T. P. Meenakshisundaram, Valluvarum Makalirum, on the concept of womanhood in the works of ancient Tamil poets; scholarship
- Yatindranath Sengupta, Marumaya, Bengali

=== Spanish language ===
- Enrique Bustamante y Ballivián, Junin, Peru
- León de Greiff, Libro de signos, precedido de Los pingüinos peripatéticos; seguido de Fantasías de nubes al viento (Segundo Mamotreto), Columbia
- Federico García Lorca, Poeta en Nueva York written this year, published posthumously in 1940, first translation into English as "A Poet in New York", 1988)
- León Felipe, Veersos y oraciones del caminante ("Verses and Prayers of the Walker"), second volume (first volume, 1920); Spain
- Luis Fabio Xammar, Pensativamente, Peru

=== Other ===
- Gonzalve Desaulniers, Les bois qui chantent; French language;, Canada
- Jens August Schade, Hjertebogen ("The Heart Book"), Denmark
- J. Slauerhoff, Serenade, Dutch

== Awards and honors ==
- John Masefield becomes Poet Laureate of the UK.
- Pulitzer Prize for Poetry: Conrad Aiken: Selected Poems
- Frost Medal: Jessie Rittenhouse and (posthumously) to Bliss Carman, and George Edward Woodberry

== Births ==
Death years link to the corresponding "[year] in poetry" article:

- January 1
  - Adunis or "Adonis" (Ali Ahmad Said Esber), Syrian-born Arabic poet and essayist who makes his career largely in Lebanon and France
  - Jean-Pierre Duprey (died 1959), French poet and sculptor
- January 5 – Jesús Rosas Marcano (died 2001), Venezuelan poet
- January 23 – Derek Walcott (died 2017), Caribbean St. Lucian-born English-language poet, playwright, writer and visual artist
- February 15 – Bruce Dawe (died 2020), Australian poet
- March – Alvin Aubert (died 2014), African-American poet and scholar
- March 21 – Roger-Arnould Rivière (suicide 1959), French poet
- March 26 – Gregory Corso (died 2001), American poet
- April 8 – Miller Williams (died 2015), American poet, translator and editor
- May 3 – Juan Gelman (died 2014), Argentine poet
- May 8 – Gary Snyder, American poet, essayist, lecturer and environmental activist
- May 11 – Kamau Brathwaite (died 2020), Caribbean native of Barbados, writer, poet, dramatist and academic
- May 12 – Mazisi Kunene (died 2006), South African poet
- May 23 – Friedrich Achleitner (died 2019), Austrian architect and poet
- June 9 – Roberto Fernández Retamar (died 2019), Cuban poet and literary critic
- June 11 – Roy Fisher (died 2017), English poet and jazz pianist
- June 23 – Anthony Thwaite (died 2021), English poet, writer and editor, married to the writer Ann Thwaite
- August 17 – Ted Hughes (died 1998), English poet and children's writer, Poet Laureate of the United Kingdom from 1984
- September 25 – Shel Silverstein (died 1999), American writer of children's verse
- October 10 – Harold Pinter (died 2008), English playwright, poet, actor, theatre director, screenwriter, human rights activist, winner of the 2005 Nobel Prize in Literature
- October 24 – Elaine Feinstein (died 2019), English poet, novelist, short-story writer, playwright, biographer and translator
- November 16 – Chinua Achebe (died 2013), Nigerian writer and poet
- November 19 – Bernard Noel (died 2021), French poet and writer
- November 20 – Bai Hua (died 2019), Chinese poet, dramatist and novelist
- December 2 – Jon Silkin (died 1997), English poet
- December 27 – Attoor Ravi Varma (died 2019), Indian Malayalam poet and translator
- Also:
  - Tony Connor, English poet and playwright
  - Adolph Endler, German
  - Brian Higgins (died 1965), British poet, mathematician and rugby league player

== Deaths ==
Birth years link to the corresponding "[year] in poetry" article:

- March 2 – D. H. Lawrence (born 1885), English author, poet, playwright, essayist and literary critic, from tuberculosis
- April 10 – Alfred Williams (born 1877), English "hammerman poet"
- April 14 – Vladimir Mayakovsky (born 1893), Russian poet, committed suicide
- April 21 – Robert Bridges (born 1844), English Poet Laureate
- April 29 – Maria Polydouri (born 1902), Greek poet, from tuberculosis

== See also ==
- Poetry
- List of poetry awards
- List of years in poetry
- New Objectivity in German literature and art
- Oberiu movement in Russian art and poetry
