= David Spence =

David Spence may refer to:

- David Spence (VC) (1818–1877), Scottish recipient of the Victoria Cross
- David Spence (Canadian politician) (1867–1940), member of the Canadian House of Commons
- Dave Spence (born 1958), candidate for governor in Missouri
- David Spence (Manitoba politician) (1824–1885), politician in Manitoba, Canada
- David Spence (mathematician) (1926–2003), New Zealand and British mathematician
- David Spence (rubber chemistry) (1881–1957), pioneer in the field of rubber chemistry
- Dave Spence (cricketer) (born 1930), New Zealand cricketer
- David Jerome Spence (1873–1955), Canadian architect, designer of such buildings as Montreal's Martlet House
- David H. N. Spence (1925-1985) British botanist
