= Russell Merrin =

New Zealand cricketer

Personal information
- Full name: Russell Conway Merrin
- Born: 11 May 1945 (age 81); Kaiapoi, New Zealand
- Batting: Left-handed
- Bowling: Right-arm fast-medium

Domestic team information
- Years: Team
- 1967-68 to 1974-75: Canterbury

Career statistics
Competition	FC	List A
Matches	11	2
Runs scored	141	7
Batting average	12.81	3.50
100s/50s	0/0	0/0
Top score	25	4
Balls bowled	1785	112
Wickets	30	2
Bowling average	24.16	43.00
5 wickets in innings	1	–
10 wickets in match	0	n/a
Best bowling	7/61	2/28
Catches/stumpings	4/–	1/–
- Source: Cricinfo, 10 September 2017

Russell Conway Merrin (born 11 May 1945) is a former New Zealand cricketer who played first-class cricket for Canterbury from 1967 to 1975.

An opening bowler, Merrin took 7 for 61 in the first innings on his first-class debut for Canterbury in 1967-68 in a match against a New Zealand XI (essentially the national team at the time without its Canterbury representatives). They remained his best first-class bowling figures.

Merrin also played Hawke Cup cricket for North Canterbury from 1964 to 1985, and was named in the Hawke Cup Team of the Century in 2011. He took 6 for 41 when North Canterbury won the title from Manawatu in January 1967.
