= Marcel McKenzie =

New Zealand cricketer (born 1978)

Personal information
- Full name: Marcel Norman McKenzie
- Born: 13 May 1978 (age 48); Oamaru, North Otago, New Zealand
- Batting: Right-handed
- Bowling: Right-arm leg break
- Role: Batsman
- Relatives: Norman McKenzie (father)

Domestic team information
- Years: Team
- 1998/99–2001/02: Canterbury
- 2002/03–2007/08: Otago
- 2010/11: North Otago
- Source: ESPNcricinfo, 15 May 2016

Marcel Norman McKenzie (born 13 May 1978) is a New Zealand former cricketer. He played first-class and List A matches for Canterbury and Otago between the 1998–99 and 2007–08 seasons.

McKenzie was born at Oamaru in North Otago in 1978 and educated at Shirley Boys' High School in Christchurch after his family moved to live in the city when he was 13. His father, Norman McKenzie, had played for Otago during the 1972–73 season, and Marcel McKenzie played club cricket for the Christchurch East Shirley club where he was employed for a time as an assistant groundman. He played age-group cricket for Canterbury from the 1995–96 season, was included in the New Zealand Academy developmental squad in 1996–97 and made his first-class debut for Canterbury towards the end of the 1998–99 season.

Described as a "middle-order batsman" who showed "the patience and concentration required to build long innings" and as "a fine prospect", in four seasons playing for Canterbury McKenzie scored 370 first-class runs. He played List A cricket for the province and for the New Zealand Academy again the touring England A side. After only two appearances during the 2001–02 season, he moved to Otago ahead of the 2002–03 where he played until the end of the 2007–08 season, scoring 685 first-class runs, including the only century of his senior career, a score of exactly 100 made against Canterbury in his first season at Otago.
