= David Sewell =

New Zealand cricketer (born 1977)

Personal information
- Full name: David Graham Sewell
- Born: 20 October 1977 (age 49); Christchurch, Canterbury, New Zealand
- Batting: Right-handed
- Bowling: Left-arm fast-medium

International information
- National side: New Zealand (1997)
- Only Test (cap 203): 25 September 1997 v Zimbabwe

Domestic team information
- Years: Team
- 1995/96–2005/06: Otago
- 2001/02–2014/15: North Otago

Career statistics
Competition	Test	FC	LA
Matches	1	67	23
Runs scored	1	282	32
Batting average	–	5.87	5.33
100s/50s	0/0	0/0	0/0
Top score	1*	24	11*
Balls bowled	138	12,305	984
Wickets	0	218	25
Bowling average	–	28.72	32.52
5 wickets in innings	–	10	0
10 wickets in match	–	1	0
Best bowling	–	8/31	4/51
Catches/stumpings	0/–	15/–	2/–
- Source: CricInfo, 4 May 2017

David Graham Sewell (born 20 October 1977) is a former New Zealand cricketer. He played one Test match for New Zealand against Zimbabwe in 1997. He played first-class cricket for Otago between the 1995–96 season and 2005–06.

Sewell was born at Christchurch in 1977 and educated at Waitaki Boys' High School in Oamaru. A left-arm fast-medium bowler, he played age-group cricket for Otago before making his senior representative debut for the provincial team in February 1996. Later in the year he toured Australia and England with the New Zealand national under-19 cricket team, playing six under-19 Test matches and three under-19 One Day Internationals.

He played regularly for Otago from the following season, taking over 200 wickets for the representative team. He took a total of 10 five-wicket hauls, with his best bowling figures of eight wickets for the cost of 31 runs coming for Otago against Central Districts in 1996–97. He toured South Africa with the New Zealand Academy team in 1997 before being part of the tour of Zimbabwe later in the year as a replacement for Andrew Penn who withdrew due to injury. He played only one Test match on the tour, opening the bowling in the second Test but failing to take a wicket on what Wisden called "a welcoming batting strip".

Sewell played his final matches for Otago during the 2005–06 season. He played for North Otago in the Hawke Cup between 2001–02 and 2014–15, taking six wickets in the team's win in the 2010–11 Challenge Match against Manawatu.

== See also ==
- One-Test wonder
