= Graeme Lowans =

New Zealand cricketer (1934–2014)

- Lowans in 1962

Personal information
- Full name: Graeme Edward Lowans
- Born: 8 May 1934; Nelson, New Zealand
- Died: 19 February 2014 (aged 79); Nelson, New Zealand
- Nickname: Monk
- Batting: Left-handed
- Bowling: Right-arm slow-medium
- Role: Batsman

Domestic team information
- Years: Team
- 1959/60–1964/65: Central Districts

Career statistics
Competition	First-class
Matches	23
Runs scored	1,053
Batting average	28.45
100s/50s	1/8
Top score	100
Catches/stumpings	10/–
- Source: Cricinfo, 30 September 2017

Graeme Edward Lowans (8 May 1934 – 19 February 2014) was a New Zealand cricketer who played first-class cricket for Central Districts from 1959 to 1965, and Hawke Cup cricket for Nelson from 1958 to 1975.

Lowans' best first-class season was his first, 1959–60, when he made 395 runs at 35.90. He scored his only century the next season when he made 100 against Canterbury.

Lowans was a stalwart for Nelson in the Hawke Cup, forming an opening partnership with his Central Districts partner Lawrie Reade during Nelson's hold on the title between 1958 and 1965. He played in 39 Hawke Cup challenge and elimination matches, scoring 2120 runs at 37.19 and hitting four centuries.

Born in Nelson, Lowans was educated at Nelson College from 1947 to 1949. He also represented Nelson at association football and badminton. He and his wife Marilynne had three daughters.
