= Lance McCaskill =

New Zealand agricultural instructor, lecturer, conservationist, writer

Lance McCaskill CBE
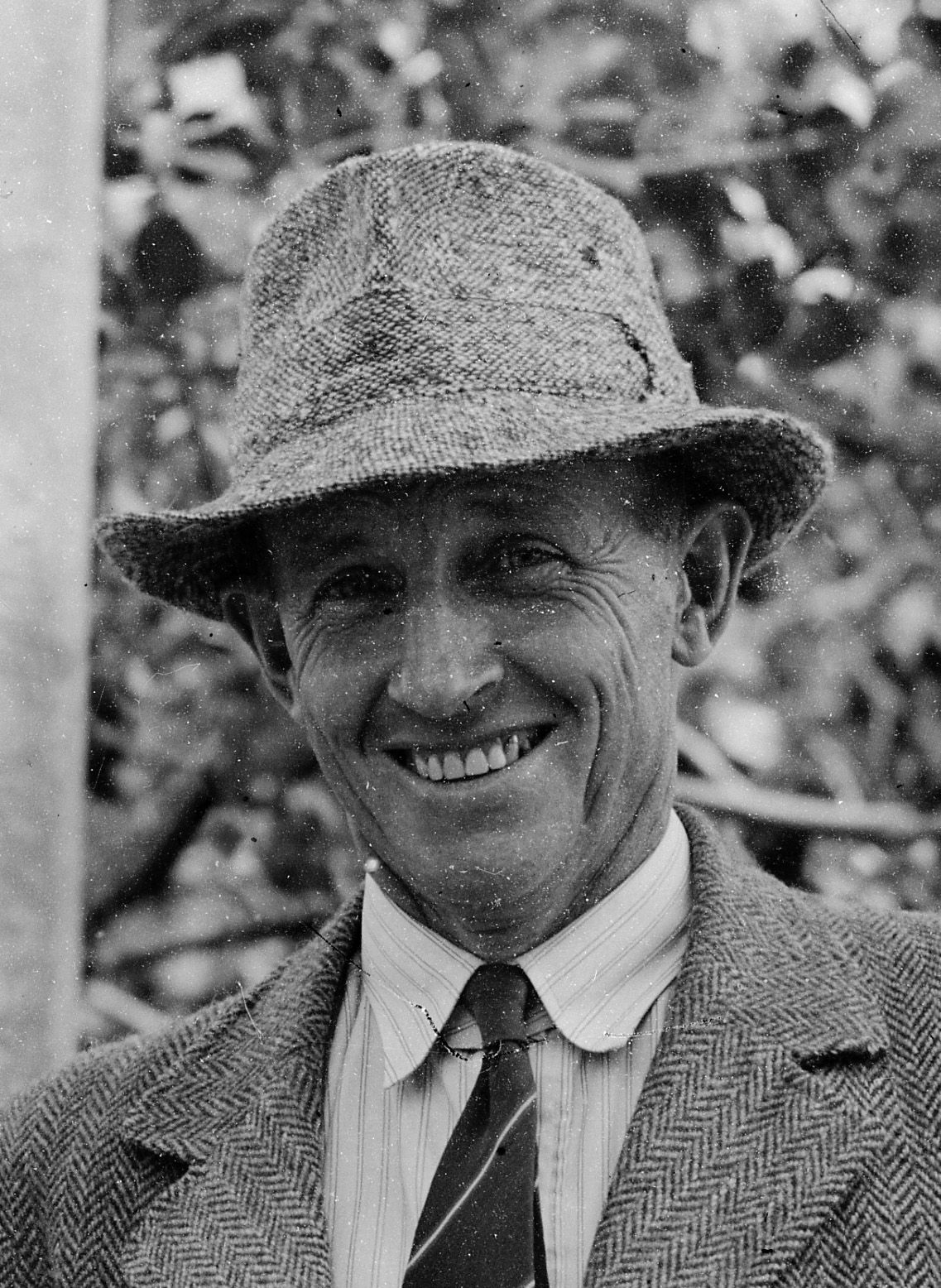
- McCaskill in 1945
- Born: Lancecot William McCaskill; 8 May 1900; Winchester, New Zealand
- Died: 9 August 1985 (aged 85); Christchurch, New Zealand
- Children: Margery Blackman (b.1930)
- Scientific career
- Thesis: Fertilizers in New Zealand, 1867–1929 (1929)

Lancelot William McCaskill CBE (8 May 1900 – 9 August 1985) was a New Zealand agricultural instructor, lecturer, conservationist and writer. Born in Winchester, South Canterbury, New Zealand, he became aware of soil erosion problems in 1929 through his work towards his master's thesis Fertilizers in New Zealand, 1867–1929. He argued in favour of land management and conservation over downstream engineering solutions. His long career of public advocacy for soil conservation made him a pioneer of environmentalism, as it is understood today.

In the 1969 New Year Honours, McCaskill was appointed a Commander of the Order of the British Empire, for services to agriculture and soil conservation. He was awarded an honorary DSc by the University of Canterbury in 1978.

McCaskill died in Christchurch on 9 August 1985.
