= Kate Challis Excelsa Hooper =

New Zealand nurse (1894–1982)

Kate Challis Excelsa Hooper OBE (25 June 1894 – 29 November 1982) was a New Zealand nurse, nursing administrator, community worker and feminist. She was born in Devonport, Auckland, New Zealand on 25 June 1894.

In the 1969 New Year Honours, Hooper was appointed an Officer of the Order of the British Empire, for services to the community, especially to nursing and voluntary organisations.
