= Des Ferrow =

New Zealand cricketer (1933–2020)

Personal information
- Full name: Desmond Joseph Ferrow
- Born: 29 October 1933; Wollongong, New South Wales, Australia
- Died: 5 December 2020 (aged 87); Tauranga, Bay of Plenty, New Zealand
- Batting: Right-handed
- Bowling: Right-arm off-spin

Domestic team information
- Years: Team
- 1956/57–1957/58: Northern Districts
- Source: Cricinfo, 1 November 2020

Desmond Joseph Ferrow (29 October 1933 – 5 December 2020) was a New Zealand cricketer. He played in four first-class matches for Northern Districts from 1956 to 1958.

Ferrow was an off-spin bowler who took his best first-class figures of 4 for 50 in Northern Districts' inaugural first-class match in the 1956-57 Plunket Shield. He played for many years for Bay of Plenty, and holds their record for the best match figures of 13 for 51 (7 for 35 and 6 for 16) against King Country in 1960. In 1956 he was the first Bay of Plenty bowler to take 10 wickets in a match.
