= Buller cricket team =

New Zealand cricket team

Personnel
- Owner: Buller Cricket Association

Team information
- Founded: 1900s
- Home ground: Buller High School, Westport; Craddock Park, Westport

History
- Hawke Cup wins: 1
- Official website: BCA

The Buller cricket team represents the Buller District on the north-west coast of New Zealand's South Island, with its headquarters in Westport. It is one of the 21 teams from around New Zealand that compete in the Hawke Cup, which it won in 2016.

== History ==
Cricket began in Buller in the 1860s. In the early years of the 20th century the Buller Cricket Association was formed. It was granted affiliation with the New Zealand Cricket Council in 1925.

Buller players are eligible to represent Canterbury in the Plunket Shield. Several have done so, and three have represented New Zealand.

Buller first competed for the Hawke Cup, the pinnacle of district cricket in New Zealand, in 1947. They have the smallest population base of any of the 21 Hawke Cup teams. Captained by Troy Scanlon, who took nine wickets, they won the title in January 2016 when they defeated Canterbury Country. Scanlon also took nine wickets when they unsuccessfully defended the title against North Otago a fortnight later in Westport. As of late 2024, Scanlon holds both the run-scoring and wicket-taking records for Buller in all representative matches, with 4,775 runs and 245 wickets in 121 matches over 26 seasons.

There are four teams in the Buller Cricket Association: Athletic, High School, Ngakawau and Old Boys.
