= Carl Zimmerman (cricketer) =

New Zealand cricketer

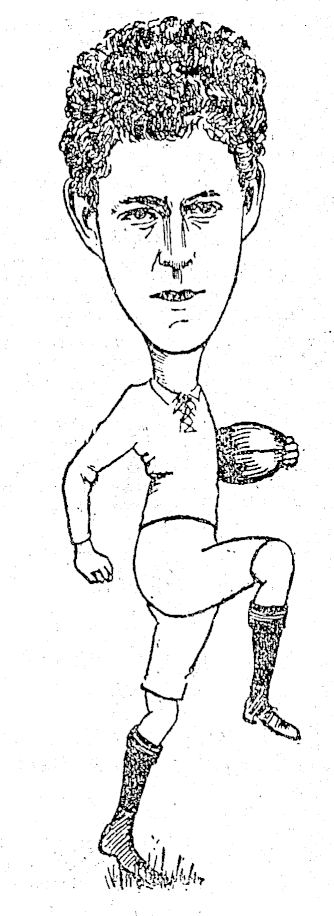
- Carl Zimmerman, Canterbury rugby rep, 1918

Personal information
- Born: 24 July 1898; Auckland, New Zealand
- Died: 10 May 1969 (aged 70); Oamaru, North Otago, New Zealand
- Batting: Left-handed
- Bowling: Left-arm fast-medium

Domestic team information
- Years: Team
- 1923/24–1946/47: North Otago
- 1925/26–1929/30: Otago

Career statistics
Competition	First-class
Matches	9
Runs scored	269
Batting average	20.69
100s/50s	0/1
Top score	77
Balls bowled	774
Wickets	8
Bowling average	38.00
5 wickets in innings	0
10 wickets in match	0
Best bowling	3/47
Catches/stumpings	7/–
- Source: Cricinfo, 7 December 2019

Carl Zimmerman (24 July 1898 – 10 May 1969) was a New Zealand sportsman. He played nine first-class cricket matches for Otago between the 1925–26 and 1929–30 seasons, represented the Canterbury Rugby Union and played competitive squash. He lived most of his adult life in Oamaru, working first as a teacher, then as a lawyer.

== Life and work career ==
Carl Zimmerman's father, Richard Carl Zimmerman, was a violinist, conductor and violin teacher who migrated to New Zealand from Austria in 1888 and eventually settled in Christchurch. Carl was born in the city in 1898 and educated at Christchurch Boys' High School and at Canterbury College, where he was awarded a Master of Arts degree with first-class honours in history.

He taught history at Waitaki Boys' High School in Oamaru from 1920. One of his pupils there, Charles Brasch, later described him as one of the better teachers at the school, and said of him, "I liked our manly young history master, Carl Zimmerman, good cricketer and handsome upright figure, blue-eyed with pale skin and black close-curling hair, who had indifferent health and perhaps some tender susceptibilities under a rather quick-fire manner and uncertainty of temper."

He married Margaret Grave in Oamaru in August 1925. In 1926 he began studying law and in 1932 went into partnership with his father-in-law when he joined the Oamaru law firm of Lee, Grave and Grave.

== Cricket career ==
In his youth in Christchurch, Zimmerman was a rugby union player as well as a cricketer, representing Canterbury at rugby. He played both sports at school and was coached by the former Canterbury cricket player Arthur Thomas. He played club cricket for West Christchurch Cricket Club before moving to Oamaru in 1920 after which he played for Oamaru Cricket Club and represented the minor association of North Otago from the mid-1920s to the mid-1940s. He was one of the few North Otago players to be selected to play first-class cricket for Otago, which he did regularly in the late 1920s.

A left-handed batsman who was considered "very solid" but also "entertaining" and with the ability to score quickly, in 1925–26, in his second match for Otago, Zimmerman made 77 runs in the second innings against Auckland, adding 151 for the fourth wicket with his captain, Ernest Blamires. This was his highest score, and only half-century, in nine first-class matches for the provincial side. He also took eight wickets in first-class matches and was described as "a bowler with a fine length" who could "spin the ball nicely".

Playing for Oamaru, Zimmerman won the North Otago Cricket Association batting award in 1925–26, with a batting average of 91 runs per innings. In late 1937 he scored 113, 212 and 151 in successive innings for Oamaru and when the club celebrated its sesquicentenary in 2014, Zimmerman was named in its all-time greatest eleven.

When working as a teacher his opportunities to play senior cricket were limited, although after moving to the legal profession these increased. Playing for North Otago against the touring Australians in 1927–28, Zimmerman reached his 50 in 28 minutes, and his century in 46 minutes, finishing on 117 not out. Although the Australians were resting their leading bowlers the wicket was considered difficult to bat on and the score was the first century scored against the Australians during the tour. The Gisborne Times considered him to be a candidate to represent New Zealand against the tourists later in the season. Two weeks previously, in North Otago's match against Southland, he had scored 117 then taken five wickets for four runs on the opening day, a performance the Timaru Herald called this "one of the most notable feats in any kind of representative cricket this season". He scored 36 for Otago against the Australians in a first-class match, but was not selected for the New Zealand side in either of their matches against the tourists. In 1932–33 he took four wickets in each innings and made 145 not out against Hawke's Bay and continued to play for North Otago until the mid 1940s.

== Later life ==
As well as cricket, Zimmerman played squash competitively for Oamaru. He also played golf and was still playing club cricket in 1949.

Zimmerman died at Oamaru in 1969. He was aged 70.
