= 1969 New Year Honours (New Zealand) =

Annual awards for New Zealanders

The 1969 New Year Honours in New Zealand were appointments by Elizabeth II on the advice of the New Zealand government to various orders and honours to reward and highlight good works by New Zealanders. The awards celebrated the passing of 1968 and the beginning of 1969, and were announced on 1 January 1969.

The recipients of honours are displayed here as they were styled before their new honour.

== Knight Bachelor ==
- Walter Edwin Bate OBE – of Hastings. For services to local government and to the community.
- James Bell Donald JP – of Auckland. For services to the community.
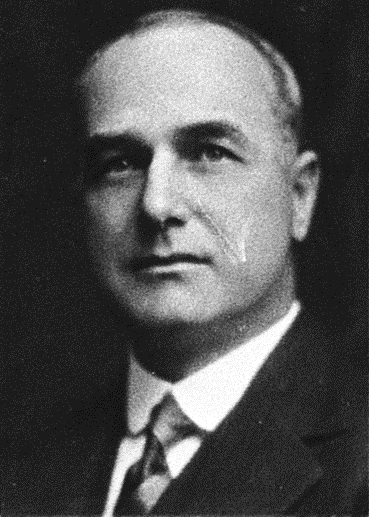
Sir James Donald

== Order of Saint Michael and Saint George ==
=== Companion (CMG) ===
- Barton Albert Barton-Ginger JP – of Wellington. For services to the community.
- George Robert Laking – Secretary of External Affairs.
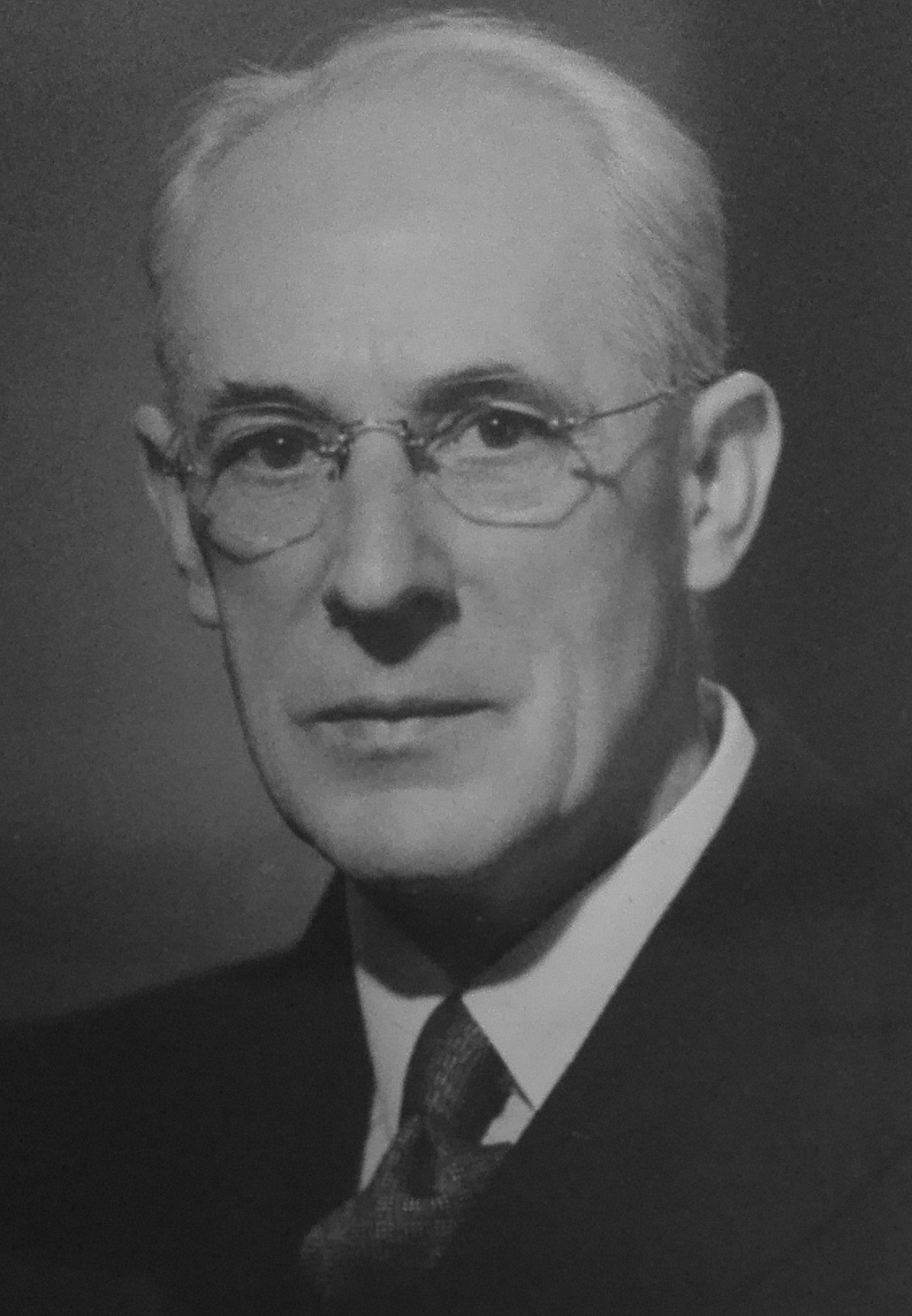
Barton Barton-Ginger

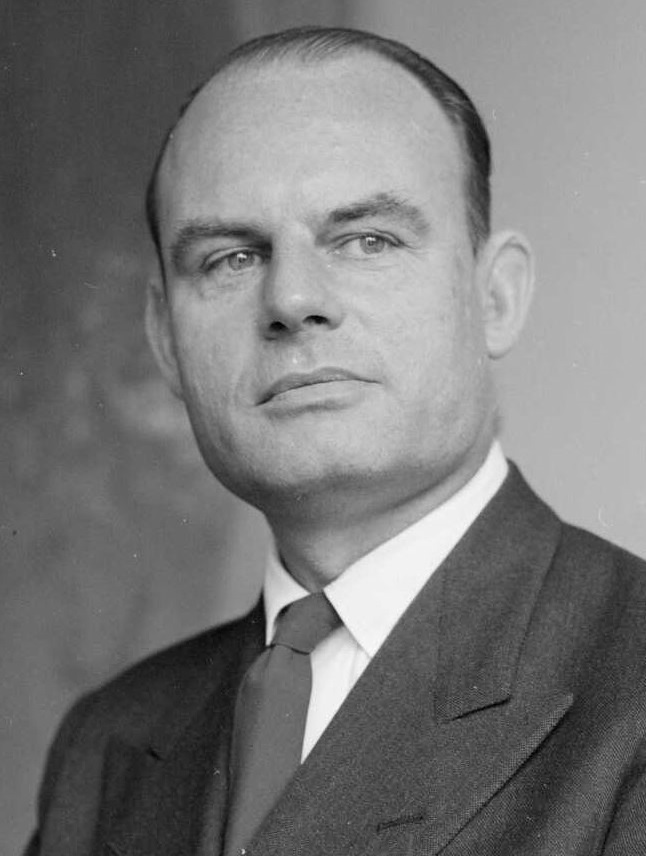
George Laking

== Order of the British Empire ==
=== Commander (CBE) ===
Civil division

- William Baird JP – of Southland. For services to local government.
- Allan William Gooder JP – chairman, Auckland Electric Power Board.
- Lancelot William McCaskill – of Christchurch. For services to agriculture and soil conservation.
- Clement George Trotter OBE – of Hāwera. For services to the community.

Military division

- Air Commodore Stanley Gilbert Quill OBE DFC – Royal New Zealand Air Force.
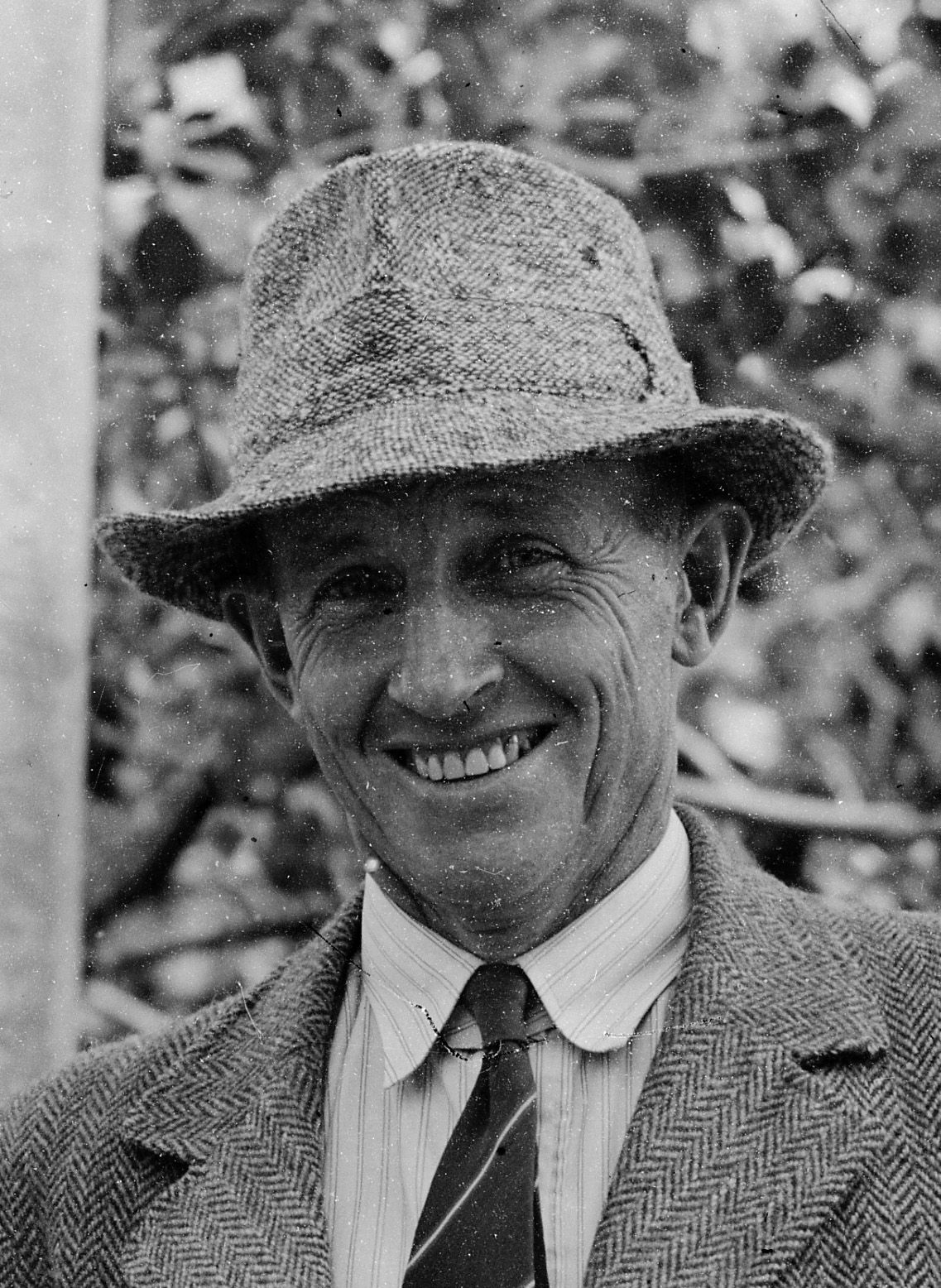
Lance McCaskill

=== Officer (OBE) ===
Civil division

- William John Court – of Whangārei. For services to commerce and to the community.
- John Herbert Ferguson JP – of Auckland. For services to the dairy industry.
- Kate Challis Excelsa Hooper – of Wellington. For services to the community, especially to nursing and voluntary organisations.
- Ernest Albert Lee JP – lately senior magistrate, Christchurch.
- Bruce Wellesley Lindeman – of Napier. For services to industry.
- Edward William Mills – of Lower Hutt. For services to education.
- Laurence Arthur Page Sherriff – of Marton. For services to farming, particularly meat production.
- Jean Taylor JP – matron-in-chief, Auckland Hospital.
- Victor Walton Wilson – of Timaru. For services, to local government.
- William James Winefield – of Dunedin. For services to the community.
- William Bennett Young – of Hamilton. For services to the building industry.

Military division

- Lieutenant-Colonel John Chapman Andrew ED – Royal New Zealand Infantry Regiment (Territorial Force).
- Commander Alfred Vivian Kempthorne – Royal New Zealand Navy.
- Group Captain Robert Berry Watson – Royal New Zealand Air Force.

=== Member (MBE) ===
Civil division

- Edward Blechynden – of Palmerston North. For services to education.
- William Alan Carthew JP – of Pahiatua. For services to the community.
- Kenneth Seymour Cox JP – of Putāruru. For services to local government and to the community.
- Richard John Feltham MB ChB. For services to the community as a medical practitioner at Hunterville.
- Mary Alice Hopkirk – of Canterbury. For services to the Girl Guide movement.
- Magnus Sinclair Hughson – of New Plymouth. For services to youth.
- Ernest Mervyn Hall Kemp – Mayor of Tawa.
- Ralph Alfred Lilly – of Nelson. For services to music.
- Ira David McIvor – of Invercargill. For services to the community.
- Alexander James McRae – of Waimate. For services to local government.
- Clarence Meachen JP – of Wellington. For services to the community.
- Donald Derek Merritt JP – of Nelson. For services to road transport administration.
- Clarence Aeldred Moore JP – of Katikati. For services to farming and to the community.
- Joseph Alvan Simpkin JP – of Dargaville. For services to local government.
- Hopaea Ahonata Te Hana – of Ōtaki. For services to the Māori people.
- Roy Leslie Thornton – of Auckland. For services to horticulture.
- Edward John Waters – of Auckland. For services to the community, particularly to the Disabled Servicemen's League.
- Ivan Douglas Whyte – of Gore. For services to the community.

Military division

- Major Gerard Patrick Brown – Royal New Zealand Infantry Regiment (Regular Force).
- Squadron Leader Peter Lindly Dick Cummins – Royal New Zealand Air Force.
- Warrant Officer Class II David William Joseph Faulkner – Royal New Zealand Infantry Regiment (Regular Force).
- Lieutenant (SD) Ian McKenzie Fraser – Royal New Zealand Navy.
- Warrant Officer Lester Edward Goslin – Royal New Zealand Air Force.
- Major Robin Guy Williams – Royal New Zealand Infantry Regiment (Regular Force).

== Companion of the Imperial Service Order (ISO) ==
- Roy Ernest Owen – lately Government Printer.

== British Empire Medal (BEM) ==
=== For gallantry ===
Military division

- Able Seaman Michael Lindsay Ashwell – Royal New Zealand Navy. For courage, presence of mind and complete disregard for his own personal safety in rescuing a man who fell overboard from an Auckland ferry on 23 April 1968.
- Lance Corporal (temporary) Raymond John Burrell – Royal New Zealand Infantry Regiment (Territorial Force). During a Battalion camp in March 1968, without regard to his own personal safety and in the face of calculated danger was instrumental in saving life and property in a serious fire in his company cookhouse, resulting in severe burns and injury to himself.
- Sergeant Ronald Edward McNaughton – Royal New Zealand Air Force. For courage and coolness in action whilst serving with the Medical Services Team in Vietnam, in assisting casualties under heavy fire.
- Able Seaman Neville George Robert Stapleton – Royal New Zealand Navy. For courage and exemplary devotion to duty, on 12–13 June 1968, when HMNZS Mako succeeded in effecting the rescue of the yacht Christina at the height of a severe storm.

=== For meritorious service ===
Civil division

- Undine Marie Clarke. For service to the community, particularly in the fields of the arts and ballet.
- William James Hopkins Duckworth – resident engineer, Railways Department, Greymouth.
- Alma Dagma Duncan – matron, Presbyterian Social Service Association, Margaret Wilson Home, Timaru.
- Ivy Jane Elliott – matron, Presbyterian Social Service Peacehaven Home, Invercargill.
- Jean Alice Findlay. For services to the community in Pahiatua.
- Irene Alice Gore. For services to the community in Waipukurau.
- Ada Florence Hardie JP. For services to the community, particularly for earthquake relief work, at Inangahua.
- Makoare Matiu – line foreman, New Zealand Electricity Department, Inangahua.
- Edward Alex Matthews. For service as a voluntary blood donor in Auckland.
- Marjorie Rona Michie – Plunket nurse, Wanganui.
- James Millar. For services to the community, especially the South Taranaki Crippled Children Society.
- Thomas Edward Moore – controller, Civil Defence, Inangahua County.
- Nolan Bayden Oxnam – sergeant, New Zealand Police Force, Nelson.
- Edric Edwin Patten. For services to the community in Little River.
- Ian Rose – constable, New Zealand Police Force, Taradale.
- Gladys Irene Simpson – lately district nurse, Nurse Maude Association, Christchurch.
- Phaedrus Bickle Stacey – distribution engineer, Electricity Department, Nelson. For earthquake relief work.
- Noel Clyde Waters – senior sergeant, New Zealand Police Force, Wairoa.

Military division

- Chief Petty Officer Coxswain William Alexander Bradley – Royal New Zealand Navy.
- Flight Sergeant James Ronald Charlton – Royal New Zealand Air Force.
- Sergeant (temporary) Charles Cranmer – Royal New Zealand Army Medical Corps (Regular Force).
- Chief Control Electrical Artificer John Owen Iversen – Royal New Zealand Navy.

== Queen's Police Medal (QPM) ==
- James Bain McLean – superintendent, New Zealand Police Force.

== Queen's Fire Services Medal (QFSM) ==
- Ronald Charles Sylvester Bush – deputy chief fire officer, Blenheim Volunteer Fire Brigade.
- Andrew Russell Mason – lately station officer, Auckland Metropolitan Fire Board.

== Air Force Cross (AFC) ==
- Group Captain Derek Butler Flintoff – Royal New Zealand Air Force.
- Squadron Leader Richard Francis Lawry – Royal New Zealand Air Force.
