= James Archer (rugby union) =

New Zealander rugby union player (1900-1979)

- Born: James Albert Archer; 31 May 1900 Invercargill, New Zealand
- Died: 15 July 1979 (aged 79) Oamaru, New Zealand
- Height: 1.83 m (6 ft 0 in)
- Weight: 83 kg (183 lb)
- Notable relative: Robin Archer (nephew)

Rugby union career
- Position: Wing forward
Provincial / State sides
Years	Team	Apps	(Points)
- Southland
International career
Years	Team	Apps	(Points)
1925	New Zealand	0	(0)

James Albert Archer (31 May 1900 – 15 July 1979) was a New Zealand rugby union player. He was educated at Waimahaka School. A wing forward, Archer represented Southland at a provincial level, and was selected in 1925 for the New Zealand national side, the All Blacks, for their tour of New South Wales. He played two matches for the All Blacks: a warm-up game against Wellington; and then the tour opener against New South Wales, where he suffered a serious knee injury that affected the rest of his rugby career. Archer did not appear in any internationals.
