= William Parker (New Zealand cricketer) =

New Zealand cricketer

Personal information
- Full name: William Henry Parker
- Born: 13 October 1862; Collingwood, Melbourne, Victoria, Australia
- Died: 11 September 1930 (aged 67); Dunedin, Otago, New Zealand
- Bowling: Right-arm legbreak

Domestic team information
- Years: Team
- 1880/81–1896/97: Otago
- Source: CricInfo, 20 May 2016

William Henry Parker (13 October 1862 – 11 September 1930) was an Australian-born cricketer. He played 25 first-class matches in New Zealand for Otago between the 1880–81 and 1896–97 seasons.

Parker was born at Collingwood in Melbourne, Victoria in 1862. He was a noted boxer in the youth, and was trained by Jem Mace who encouraged Parker to become a professional, although Parker chose to pursue his business opportunities instead. He played club cricket for Albion Cricket Club and Grange Cricket Club in Dunedin and made his representative debut for Otago in February 1881, scoring seven runs and not taking a wicket in a match against Canterbury at Christchurch. He went on to play regularly for the side in provincial cricket from the 1883–84 season, scoring 412 runs and taking 31 wickets in a total of 25 first-class matches. He captained Otago in some matches and after his death the members of Albion, one of his former clubs, noted that Parker had been "one of the best players that Otago ever had".

Professionally Parker worked in the tanning industry, owning a tannery in the North East Valley area of Dunedin. He also umpired first-class matches. He died at Dunedin in 1930 at the age of 67.
