= Natalie Wicken =

New Zealand netball player (1930–2022)

Personal information
- Full name: Natalie Mabel Wicken (Née: Nicholls)
- Born: 6 December 1930
- Died: 12 July 2022 (aged 91) Christchurch, New Zealand
- Occupation: Teacher
- Height: 1.63 m (5 ft 4 in)
- School: Nelson College for Girls

Netball career
- Playing positions: GS, GA
Years	National team	Caps
1948	New Zealand	1

Natalie Mabel Wicken (née Nicholls; 6 December 1930 – 12 July 2022) was a New Zealand netball player. She played in the goal circle for the New Zealand team in the third Test against the touring Australian team in 1948.

== Early life ==
Wickens was born Natalie Mabel Nicholls on 6 December 1930, the third daughter of Archibald Leslie Nicholls and Charlotte Mabel Nicholls (née Gibbs). She grew up in Stoke, and was educated at Nelson College for Girls, where she was active in sports, winning the junior tennis singles and doubles championships in 1944, and a member of the school netball team.

Nicholls began studying at the University of Otago in 1949, completing a Diploma of Physical Education in 1951.

== Netball career ==
Nicholls was a member of the Nelson provincial netball team, and made her first national championships appearance as a 14-year-old in Christchurch in 1945. She was a member of the Nelson team that won the third-division title at the 1947 national championships held in Nelson, and was subsequently named in the New Zealand squad to play Australia the following year. She made her debut for the New Zealand national team in the third test against Australia in Auckland; aged 17, she was the youngest member of the team. The match was won by Australia, 44–22. Nicholls was the first, and (as of 2009) the only Nelson player to be selected for the New Zealand team.

After moving to Dunedin to study at the University of Otago in 1949, Nicholls played for the Otago representative netball team. Following the 1949 national championships held in Dunedin, Nicholls was named in the South Island team, which went on to draw 15–15 with the North Island in the annual interisland match for the Atkinson Trophy. In 1950, playing for the University team in the Dunedin club competition, Nicholls' court coverage was described as "remarkable", and it was said that "her spectacular control of the ball is the envy of all basketball players". Nicholls agained gained South Island honours in 1950 and 1951.

In 1952, Nicholls moved to Auckland, and played netball for Auckland University at the annual New Zealand University Easter tournament. She went on to represent Auckland at the 1952 national championships, at which Auckland finished as runners-up, and subsequently played for the North Island team in that year's annual interisland match, won 26–15 by the South Island. She again played for Auckland at the 1953 national championships in Invercargill, won by Auckland, and was selected for the subsequent interisland game for the North Island, which resulted in a 18–18 draw.

Nicholls was awarded New Zealand University blues for netball in 1950, 1951, and 1953.

== Later life ==
In 1958, Nicholls became engaged to Henry William Wicken, and the couple subsequently married.

In 1960, Natalie Wicken took part in the meeting in England at which the first standardised international netball rules were established. She worked as a schoolteacher and coached school netball teams. In 2016, she appeared at a netball Test match between New Zealand and Jamaica in Nelson, tossing the coin before the start of the game.

Wicken died in Christchurch on 12 July 2022, at the age of 91.
