= Lawrence Reade (cricketer, born 1930) =

New Zealand cricketer (1930–2019)

Laurie Reade
Personal information
- Full name: Lawrence Burnard Reade
- Born: 21 October 1930; Nelson, New Zealand
- Died: 21 August 2019 (aged 88); Richmond, New Zealand
- Batting: Right-handed

Domestic team information
- Years: Team
- 1958/59–1962/63: Central Districts

Career statistics
Competition	First-class
Matches	24
Runs scored	1,106
Batting average	25.72
100s/50s	1/2
Top score	163
Balls bowled	6
Wickets	0
Bowling average	–
5 wickets in innings	–
10 wickets in match	–
Best bowling	–
Catches/stumpings	7/–
- Source: Cricinfo, 23 December 2017

Lawrence Burnard Reade (21 October 1930 – 21 August 2019) was a New Zealand cricketer. He played 24 first-class matches for Central Districts between 1959 and 1963 and Hawke Cup cricket for Nelson from 1949 to 1973.

Lawrie Reade was educated at Nelson College from 1945 to 1946. An opening batsman, he had his most successful first-class season in 1960–61, when he scored 417 runs at an average of 37.90, and made his highest score, 163 against Northern Districts.

He was a stalwart for Nelson in the Hawke Cup, forming an opening partnership with his Central Districts partner Graeme Lowans during Nelson's hold on the title between 1958 and 1965, and scoring more than 2,000 runs.

Reade died at Richmond on 21 August 2019.
