= Malcolm McCaw =

New Zealand cricketer (1930–2021)

Personal information
- Full name: Peter Malcolm McCaw
- Born: 10 February 1930; Inglewood, New Zealand
- Died: 28 July 2021 (aged 91)
- Batting: Right-handed
- Role: Opening batsman

Domestic team information
- Years: Team
- 1952/53: Wellington
- First-class debut: 25 December 1952 Wellington v Auckland
- Last First-class: 9 January 1953 Wellington v Otago

Career statistics
Competition	First-class
Matches	3
Runs scored	115
Batting average	19.16
100s/50s	0/1
Top score	51
Catches/stumpings	1/–
- Source: Cricinfo, 4 October 2021

Peter Malcolm McCaw (10 February 1930 – 28 July 2021) was a New Zealand cricketer and chartered accountant.

== Biography ==
McCaw was born in Inglewood, Taranaki. After attending New Plymouth Boys' High School he studied at Victoria University College in Wellington. A sound right-handed opening batsman, he played in three first-class matches for Wellington in 1952/53. He scored 51 in his first innings. He served as honorary accountant to the Wellington Cricket Association from 1970 to 1976 and as president of the Association from 1984 to 1987.

McCaw chaired the New Zealand government's Task Force for Tax Reform, which reported in 1982, and was a member of the Victoria University of Wellington (VUW) council for 17 years. In 1988, McCaw was conferred an honorary Doctor of Laws degree by VUW. He was a member of the boards of the New Zealand Wool Testing Authority, the Rural Bank, the National Bank of New Zealand and Wellington International Airport Ltd.

In 1990, McCaw was awarded the New Zealand 1990 Commemoration Medal.
