= Adelaide Hicks =

New Zealand stewardess, homemaker, midwife and nurse

Adelaide Hicks (née Martens, 6 March 1845 – 20 May 1930) was a New Zealand stewardess, homemaker, midwife and nurse.

== Early life ==
Hicks was born in London, England, the daughter of a baker, George Martens, and his wife Elizabeth (née Joyner). She emigrated first to Australia and then to New Zealand, arriving in Otago in 1862. She initially worked as a domestic servant in Dunedin and then as a stewardess on the steam ships which ran between Invercargill, Bluff and Lyttelton.

== Adult life ==
Hicks married Henry Hicks of New York in 1864 and they moved to Mosgiel. At the time of their marriage he was the owner of the New York tearooms in Bluff near Invercargill, however, he had previously worked as a crewman on vessels of various types. After their marriage, he returned to this work while Hicks took domestic work. In 1879, the couple moved to Dukes Road Taieri/Mosgiel area and set up a firewood business.

In 1884, Hicks' husband was kicked while carelessly stabling a horse and died, leaving her with nine young children to raise. Two years later she moved her family to 16 Factory Road in Mosgiel and opened a maternity home, "Hicks' Maternity Home". Although she had no formal nursing training, her establishment became the first registered maternity home in the area. The earliest surviving records of Hicks' home suggest it was small - in 1909, she attended 10 women, three in their own homes and the remainder at Hicks' home.

In the small community of Mosgiel, Hicks was called on to assist in a variety of medical situations; in 1918 she was a volunteer nurse for patients of the influenza epidemic, and on one occasion she attended the scene of a train accident where rail workers had been killed and injured while at work in the Wingatui tunnel.

In 1922, Hicks left the nursing home in her daughter Edith's hands and travelled to England to visit her brothers. On this visit she was summoned to meet the then British Queen, Queen Mary. She retired in 1927 and Edith carried on the maternity service until Hicks died in 1930. After her mother's death, Edith moved to Winton and was a maternity nurse at a hospital there. Edith Hicks retired to the original family home and hospital at 16 Factory Road in Mosgiel
