= John McCaw (farmer) =

New Zealand farm manager, farmer, and land valuer

John McCaw (4 October 1849 – 10 April 1930) was a New Zealand farm manager, farmer and land valuer. He was born in Morriston, Ayrshire, Scotland, on 4 October 1849.
