= Mick Bremner =

- Born: Selwyn George Bremner; 2 August 1930 Ōtorohanga, New Zealand
- Died: Wellington, New Zealand 29 October 2025 (aged 95)
- Height: 1.78 m (5 ft 10 in)
- Weight: 83 kg (183 lb)
- School: Mount Albert Grammar School

Rugby union career
- Position(s): First five-eighth Second five-eighth
Provincial / State sides
Years	Team	Apps	(Points)
- Auckland
-	Wellington		
-	Manawatu		
–	Canterbury		
International career
Years	Team	Apps	(Points)
1952–1960	New Zealand	2	(0)

Selwyn George "Mick" Bremner (2 August 1930 – 29 October 2025) was a New Zealand rugby union player. A first and second five-eighth, Bremner represented Auckland, Wellington, Manawatu, and Canterbury at a provincial level. He was a member of the New Zealand national side, the All Blacks, in 1952, 1956 and 1960. In 1952, he appeared in a single international, the second test against the touring Australians. Four years later, he made another test appearance, in the second-test loss to the touring Springboks. Bremner's third stint in the All Blacks was as a member of the touring party for the 1960 tour of Australia and South Africa. On that tour, he played 16 games, including six as captain, but did not appear in any of the test matches. He did not score any points in his 18 matches for the All Blacks.

Bremner went on to serve a term as president of the Wellington Rugby Football Union. He died in Wellington on 29 October 2025, at the age of 95.
