= Dennis Young (rugby union) =

New Zealand rugby union player (1930–2020)

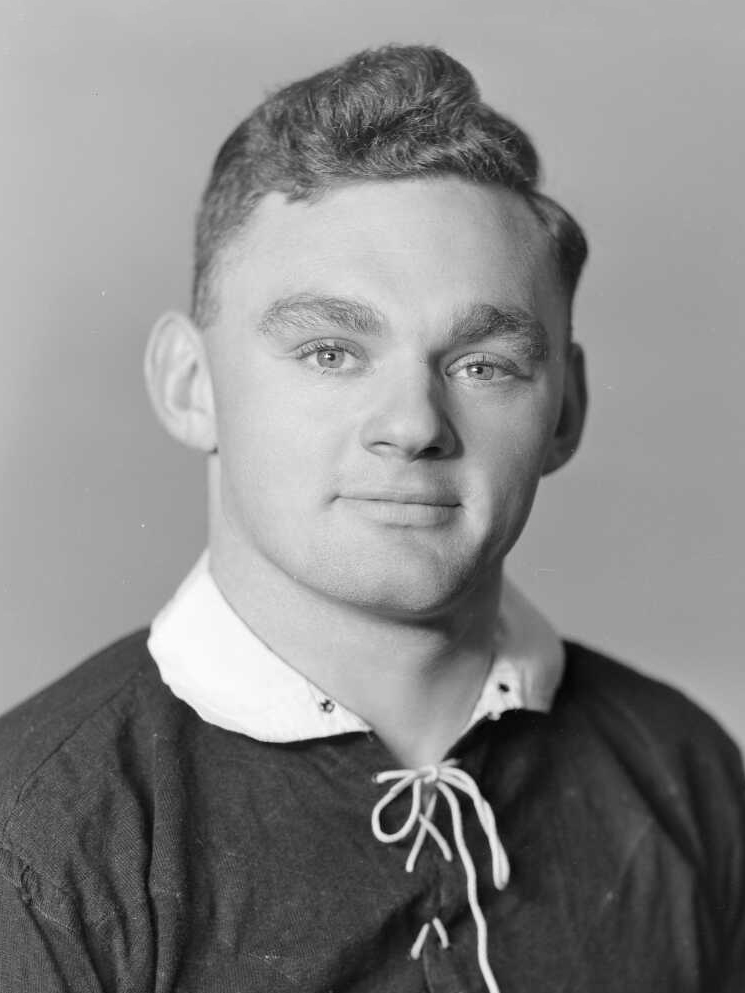
- Young c. 1951
- Born: 1 April 1930 Christchurch, New Zealand
- Died: 21 June 2020 (aged 90) Christchurch, New Zealand
- Height: 1.73 m (5 ft 8 in)
- Weight: 87 kg (192 lb)
- School: Christchurch Technical College

Rugby union career
- Position: Hooker
Provincial / State sides
| Years | Team | Apps | (Points) |
| 1950–63 | Canterbury | 139 | |
International career
| Years | Team | Apps | (Points) |
| 1956–64 | New Zealand | 22 | (0) |

Dennis Young (1 April 1930 – 21 June 2020) was a New Zealand rugby union player. A hooker, Young represented Canterbury at a provincial level, and was a member of the New Zealand national side, the All Blacks, from 1956 to 1964. He played 61 matches for the All Blacks including 22 internationals.

Young died in Christchurch on 21 June 2020.
