= Margery Blackman =

New Zealand weaver

Margery Blackman QSM
- Born: Margery Isobel McCaskill; 25 March 1930 (age 96); Dunedin, New Zealand
- Known for: Weaving
- Spouse: Gary Blackman (m. 1955; died 2022)
- Relatives: Lance McCaskill (father)

Margery Isobel Blackman QSM (née McCaskill; born 25 March 1930) is a New Zealand weaver.

== Early life and family ==
She was born in Dunedin in 1930, the daughter of naturalist Lance McCaskill, and graduated from the University of Otago with a Diploma of Home Science. She married pharmacologist, photographer and artist Gary Blackman in April 1955 at Knox Church, Christchurch.

== Weaving career ==
In 1959 she moved to Edinburgh, where her husband had been awarded a research fellowship at the University of Edinburgh, and she began to learn weaving skills. She was influenced by Scandinavian handweaving and was largely interested in floor rugs.

In 1963 she returned to Dunedin and from 1967 she worked at the Otago Museum. In 1976 she went to Edinburgh to study weaving under Scottish tapestry weaver Anna King. In 1988 she was made honorary curator of ethnographic textiles and costume from other cultures and Māori material at Otago Museum.

Blackman has organised numerous textile exhibitions, largely at the Otago Museum, including 'Islamic Rugs' in 1975, 'Indonesian Weaving' in 1981, 'Treasures from Māori Women' in 1989, and 'From Emperor's Court to Village Festival', an exhibition of Chinese textiles. In 2012, she appeared in a series of YouTube videos created by Te Papa talking about textile analysis and Māori weaving. Her work is held in the Dunedin Public Art Gallery and Museum of New Zealand Te Papa Tongarewa.

In the 1995 New Year Honours, Blackman was awarded the Queen's Service Medal for public services.

== Later life ==
Blackman's husband, Gary, died in 2022.

In 2024 Dunedin Public Art Gallery held a survey exhibition of her textile works and research practice, titled "Margery Blackman: Weaving, Life".
