= Herman van Staveren =

Dutch-born New Zealand rabbi and philanthropist

Herman van Staveren (26 January 1849 – 24 January 1930) was a notable Dutch-born New Zealand rabbi and philanthropist. He was born in Bolsward, Netherlands, in 1849.
