= Rosalie Ferner =

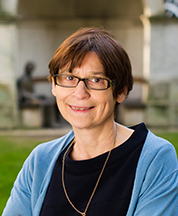
King's College portrait, 2013

Rosalie Ferner is Professor of Neurology at Guys and St Thomas's Hospital and the Department of Clinical Neuroscience at King's College London. Ferner is chairperson for the medical advisory board of the national Neuro Foundation. She has is national lead for the nationally commissioned NF1 service since and lead for the London NF2 service.

== Selected bibliography ==
- Ferner, Rosalie E., and David H. Gutmann. "International consensus statement on malignant peripheral nerve sheath tumors in neurofibromatosis 1." Cancer research 62, no. 5 (2002): 1573–1577.
- Ferner, Rosalie E., Susan M. Huson, Nick Thomas, Celia Moss, Harry Willshaw, D. Gareth Evans, Meena Upadhyaya et al. "Guidelines for the diagnosis and management of individuals with neurofibromatosis 1." Journal of medical genetics 44, no. 2 (2007): 81-88. doi:10.1136/jmg.2006.045906
- Ferner, Rosalie E. "Neurofibromatosis 1 and neurofibromatosis 2: a twenty first century perspective." The Lancet Neurology 6, no. 4 (2007): 340-351. doi:10.1016/S1474-4422(07)70075-3
