= Richard Kearney (judge) =

New Zealand judge (1930–2005)

Richard Ronald Kearney (13 May 1930 – 27 March 2005) was a New Zealand District Court Judge in Auckland and a member of the Waitangi Tribunal from 1996 to 2004.

== Early life ==
Kearney came from Auckland and attended St Peter's College. He studied law at the Victoria University, Wellington and practised law in Gisborne before he was appointed as a District Court Judge.

== Judicial career ==
Kearney was a very experienced District Court Judge, first in Wellington until 1989 when he moved to the Bay of Plenty, where he presided as a judge at the Tauranga District Court. He retired from his position at the Court in 1995, but joined the Waitangi Tribunal shortly afterwards in 1996, serving on it for eight years. He was the presiding officer in respect of important Treaty of Waitangi enquiries: Tauranga Moana (Wai 215); Flora and Fauna (Wai 262); and the Wananga Capital Establishment Claim (Wai 718). He was also the chairman of the Indecent Publications Tribunal and a member of that body.

== Chairing of Tauranga land claims ==
Kearney's heaviest assignment in his later years was as a presiding judge for the Waitangi Tribunal hearings on Maori land claims in Tauranga (Wai 215). Beginning in 1998 he presided over more 200 hearings including the hearing of the evidence of more than 50 individual claimants (all of which were found to have justifiable grievances). Resulting from these hearings a report was written which was presented to the Welcome Bay's Hairini marae in September 2004 with Judge Kearney being a guest at the event.
