= Dave Spence (cricketer) =

New Zealand cricketer

Personal information
- Full name: David Victor Spence
- Born: 8 January 1930 (age 96); Hastings, New Zealand
- Batting: Left-handed
- Bowling: Right-arm leg-spin

Domestic team information
- Years: Team
- 1955/56–1961/62: Central Districts

Career statistics
Competition	First-class
Matches	11
Runs scored	272
Batting average	16.00
100s/50s	0/1
Top score	61
Balls bowled	1,018
Wickets	14
Bowling average	42.00
5 wickets in innings	1
10 wickets in match	0
Best bowling	5/38
Catches/stumpings	6/–
- Source: CricketArchive, 29 March 2017

David Victor Spence (born 8 January 1930) is a former New Zealand cricketer who played first-class cricket for Central Districts from 1955 to 1962.

Dave Spence played five matches for Central Districts in 1955–56, one in 1960–61, and five more in 1961–62. A middle-order batsman and leg-spin bowler, he took his best bowling figures of 5 for 38 in a victory over Wellington in the second match of the 1955–56 Plunket Shield season, then made his highest score of 61 in an innings victory over Otago in the next match 11 days later. At the time he was considered a potential Test player. However, after that season he played only six more first-class matches, in which he took five wickets.

Spence also played Hawke Cup cricket for Hawke's Bay from 1950 to 1953, and for Nelson from 1954 to 1967. He was the captain of the Nelson side that held the Hawke Cup during its record title run from 1958 to 1965, and he was named in the Hawke Cup Team of the Century in 2011. In 34 Hawke Cup challenge matches, he scored 1,574 runs at an average of 36.60, and took 110 wickets at an average of 15.42.

He now lives in Gosford, New South Wales. In January 2021, with the death of Doug Bowden, he became Central Districts' oldest surviving player. With the death of Trevor McMahon in March 2026, he became New Zealand's oldest surviving first-class cricketer.
