= Amelia Mary Randall =

New Zealand companion help, church & community leader and benefactor

Amelia Mary Randall (née Davenport, 23 January 1844 – 17 October 1930) was a New Zealand companion help, church and community leader, landowner, businesswoman, and benefactor.

== Biography ==
She was born in Boulogne, France, in 1844.
