= Roger Pierce (cricketer) =

New Zealand cricketer (born 1952)

Personal information
- Full name: Roger Alen Pierce
- Born: 24 May 1952 (age 74); Motueka, New Zealand
- Batting: Right-handed
- Bowling: Right-arm medium

Domestic team information
- Years: Team
- 1971/72–1984/85: Central Districts

Career statistics
| Competition | First-class | List A |
|---|---|---|
| Matches | 53 | 19 |
| Runs scored | 2,296 | 312 |
| Batting average | 24.68 | 18.35 |
| 100s/50s | 1/14 | 0/1 |
| Top score | 100* | 57 |
| Balls bowled | 1,330 | 384 |
| Wickets | 14 | 14 |
| Bowling average | 40.42 | 17.07 |
| 5 wickets in innings | 0 | 0 |
| 10 wickets in match | 0 | 0 |
| Best bowling | 2/8 | 4/26 |
| Catches/stumpings | 40/– | 3/– |
- Source: Cricinfo, 10 September 2017

Roger Alen Pierce (born 24 May 1952) is a former New Zealand cricketer who played first-class cricket for Central Districts from 1971 to 1985.

A middle-order batsman, Pierce scored 73 and 100 not out, his highest score, for Central Districts against Northern Districts in 1973–74. He also played Hawke Cup cricket for Nelson from 1970 to 1989, and was named in the Hawke Cup Team of the Century in 2011.
