= Alfred Amory George =

New Zealand journalist, newspaper proprietor and editor and printer

Alfred Amory George (20 April 1854 – 13 October 1930) was a New Zealand journalist, newspaper proprietor and editor, and printer. He was born in London, England, on 20 April 1854.
