= Robin Archer =

New Zealand rugby union player and coach (1930–2018)

- Born: William Robert Archer; 19 September 1930 Gore, New Zealand
- Died: 9 March 2018 (aged 87) Auckland, New Zealand
- Height: 1.73 m (5 ft 8 in)
- Weight: 73 kg (161 lb)
- School: Gore High School
- University: University of Otago
- Notable relative: James Archer (uncle)

Rugby union career
- Position: First five-eighth
Provincial / State sides
Years	Team	Apps	(Points)
1953–55	Otago	24	
1956–66	Southland	91	
International career
Years	Team	Apps	(Points)
1954	NZ Universities		
1955–57	New Zealand	4	(0)
Coaching career
- Years: Team
- 1973–75, 80–81: Southland

William Robert "Robin" Archer (19 September 1930 – 9 March 2018) was a New Zealand rugby union player and coach. A first five-eighth, Archer represented Otago and Southland at a provincial level, and was a member of the New Zealand national side, the All Blacks.

== Early life ==
He was born in Gore to William Charles Archer and Alice Louisa Archer, (née Roberts). His siblings were Watson, Rayna, Linley, Hilary, Jill, Nancy and Aylwyn.

For a period during Robin's childhood the family lived in Invercargill before they returned to Gore.

Archer attended Gore High School where he was a member of the 1st XV between 1946 and 1948.

== Playing career ==
As his father had played for the Pioneer Ruby Football Club in Gore, Archer after leaving high school played his club rugby for them.

He went on to study at the University of Otago in 1949 took a break back in Gore in 1950 during which he played for the Pioneer Senior team.

He returned to his studies, graduating with a Bachelor of Science in 1955.

=== Provincial career ===
While at the University of Otago he played for the Dunedin Pirates rugby club and in 1953 was selected for the Otago team, eventually playing 24 games for them. He first came to national recognition when he played for Rest of New Zealand, then a New Zealand XV and New Zealand Universities in 1954 in the first five-eighth position. Returning permanently to Gore in 1956 he resume playing for Pioneer, which he continued up until the end of the 1966 season.

His return to Southland saw him selected for the Southland team in 1956 and was captain from 1956 to 1963 during which they won the Ranfurly Shield from Taranaki in 1959, and beat the Australian rugby team in 1958 and 1962. While no longer captain he was in the Southland side that beat the British Lions in 1966.

Archer's brother Watson (Wattie) Archer played with him in the Southland team from 1957 to 1963.

=== All Blacks ===
He was a member of the New Zealand national side, the All Blacks, from 1955 to 1957. He played 13 matches (in the first five-eighth position) for the All Blacks, including four internationals. He played in the first two tests against Australia in 1955 and was next selected to play the first and third internationals against the 1956 Springboks, missing the second test with a rib injury. He also suffered a shoulder injury in the third test.

He toured Australia in 1957 and while captain (for the game against New England at Gunnedah) he did not make the test side.

He stopped playing in 1966 in order to devote more time to his family.

=== Coaching ===
Archer later had two periods as coach of the Southland side, from 1973 to 1975 and 1980 to 1981.

With another former All Black, Ian Smith, he coached the 1971 South Island under-16 side.

== Death ==
Archer died in Auckland on 9 March 2018 at the age of 87.
