= Thomas Hickman (policeman) =

New Zealand policeman

Thomas Hickman (13 January 1848 – 4 September 1930) was a New Zealand policeman. He was born in Pont Audemer, France on 13 January 1848.
