= Nellie Ferner =

New Zealand artist, photographer and community leader

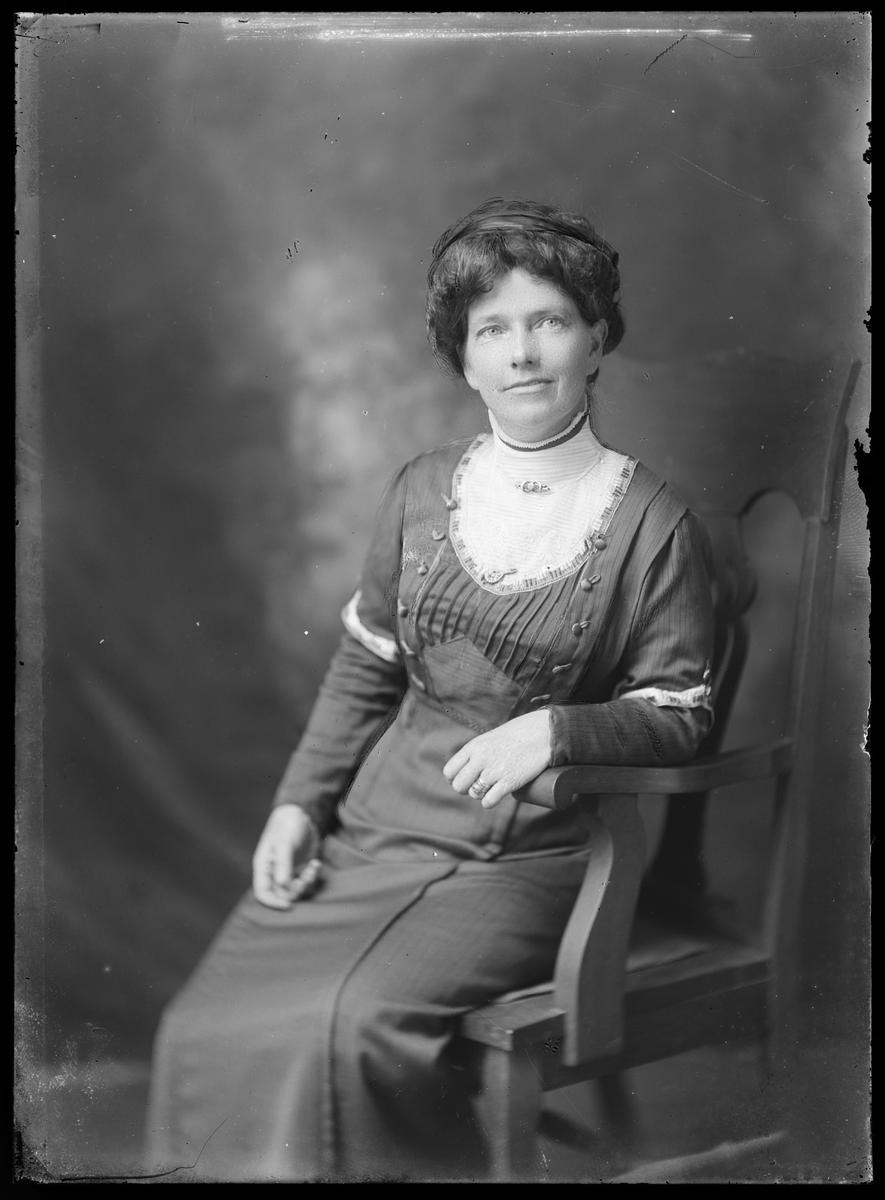
- Born: Ellen Elizabeth Aley; 13 September 1869; Auckland, New Zealand
- Died: 3 November 1930 (aged 61); Remuera, Auckland, New Zealand
- Occupation(s): Artist, photographer, community leader

Ellen Elizabeth Ferner (née Aley; 13 September 1869 – 3 November 1930) was a New Zealand artist, photographer and community leader.

Ferner was born in Auckland, New Zealand, on 13 September 1869. She died on 3 November 1930, aged 61, in Remuera, Auckland.

In 1917, Ferner founded the Play and Recreation Association in Auckland. The association arranged for the building of outdoor play areas specifically targeted at children living in poverty. They also arranged outings for these children.

Ferner was heavily involved in the Civic League and the Auckland Town-planning League. She helped design and establish public parks and reserves. In Te Puke, she helped with tree-planting schemes and designing the Main Street.
