= Quentin Pope =

New Zealander writer, journalist, poetry anthologist, war correspondent

Charles Quentin Fernie Pope (1900–1961) was a New Zealand writer, journalist, poet and poetry anthologist, foreign correspondent and war correspondent. He was born in Wanganui, New Zealand, and died in Hong Kong.

Kowhai Gold, the 1930 anthology of New Zealand poetry edited by Pope and published in London and New York included some poets still read today, such as Eileen Duggan, A. R. D. Fairburn, Robin Hyde, Katherine Mansfield and R. A. K. Mason, but with many less distinguished and sentimental contributions. Kowhai Gold came to be regarded with scorn by later generations of New Zealand poets and critics. One criticism was that "There is no national stamp upon the work, and most of it could easily have been written in England or anywhere else but New Zealand."

As a war correspondent from New Zealand in World War II, Pope chafed against the censorship of his writing, particularly about the American forces stationed in New Zealand and he "caused [..] more trouble than all the other Press correspondents put together".

== Selected works ==
- Pope, Quentin (ed.) 1930, Kowhai Gold, Dent, London & New York.
- Pope, Quentin 1934–1935. Battlefields of Sport in New Zealand Railway Magazine.
