= Elizabeth Fergusson (nurse) =

New Zealand nurse, midwife, and poultry farmer

Elizabeth Leila Ralston Fergusson (16 April 1867 – 12 February 1930) was a New Zealand nurse, midwife and poultry farmer. She was born in Balligmorrie, Ayrshire, Scotland, on 16 April 1867.
