= Canterbury Country cricket team =

New Zealand cricket team

Personnel
- Owner: Canterbury Country Cricket Association

Team information
- Founded: 1962
- Home ground: Rangiora Recreation Ground

History
- Hawke Cup wins: 9 (North Canterbury 2, Canterbury Country 8)
- Official website: http://www.canterburycountrycricket.co.nz

The Canterbury Country cricket team represents the rural areas of the northern part of the Canterbury Region in the South Island of New Zealand. It covers the area east of the Southern Alps, between the Clarence River in the north and the Rakaia River in the south, excluding metropolitan Christchurch. It is one of the 21 teams from around New Zealand that compete in the Hawke Cup, and has its base in Rangiora.

== History ==
=== Early years ===
Cricket was played in Rangiora and Kaiapoi in the 1850s. The first North Canterbury Cricket Association was formed in Rangiora in August 1892, and the competition that season comprised six clubs: Cust, Oxford, Ashley County, Ohoka, Amberley and Woodend; Amberley won the first title. The association's name was changed to Ashley County Cricket Association in September 1896, then back to North Canterbury Cricket Association in September 1911.

The association's representative team frequently played against other Canterbury associations. An annual competition among them was established in the 1920s, and a combined associations team played an annual match against Canterbury.

In 1962 a new body was formed covering all the associations, initially called the North Canterbury Minor Association. Its constituent sub-associations were Ashley (renamed again from North Canterbury to avoid confusion), Banks Peninsula, Ellesmere, Hurunui and Malvern.

=== Hawke Cup years ===
The newly-formed North Canterbury team played its first Hawke Cup elimination match against Central Otago in December 1963, winning on the first innings. One of the founders of the Association, Allan Wright, was also the team's first captain. He led North Canterbury to their first Hawke Cup title, when they beat Manawatu in January 1967; he was also the team's top-scorer in this match, with 45 and 75. It was the first time a team south of Nelson had won the Cup since Southland in 1913. North Canterbury also won the Cup in March 1988 when they beat Southland.

In the early 1990s the association changed its name to Canterbury Country. It now has two divisions – North Canterbury for the area north of Christchurch, and Country South, for the area south of Christchurch.

Canterbury Country won the Hawke Cup at the first attempt, beating Nelson narrowly in March 1993. They have since won the Cup seven more times, most recently in March 2026 when they beat Bay of Plenty by 346 runs on the first innings.
