= North Otago cricket team =

New Zealand cricket team

Personnel
- Captain: (New Zealand) Jeremy Smith
- Coach: (New Zealand) Stu Slack

Team information
- Colors: Maroon and gold
- Founded: 1899
- Home ground: Whitestone Contracting Stadium, Oamaru

History
- Hawke Cup wins: 3
- Official website: NOCA

The North Otago cricket team represents the North Otago region of New Zealand, with its headquarters in Oamaru. It is one of the 21 teams from around New Zealand that compete in the Hawke Cup, which it won most recently in early 2021. Its parent body, the North Otago Cricket Association, was founded in 1899.

== History ==
In 1864 the Oamaru Cricket Club was established. The club represented the region in matches against touring teams from Australia and England in the 1870s and 1880s. In 1892 the Waitaki Cricket Association was formed to regulate and manage cricket in the Ashburton, South Canterbury and North Otago areas, but it soon lapsed. North Otago's first match, against South Canterbury in 1896, raised interest in forming another cricket association in the area, and in 1899 the North Otago Cricket Association was formed.

Since the establishment of the Association, North Otago have played regular matches against other provincial teams and occasional matches against touring teams. In 1927–28 Carl Zimmerman was the only New Zealander to score a century against the touring Australian team, when he scored 117 not out for North Otago.

North Otago began competing in the Hawke Cup in 1958–59. They won it for the first time in March 2010 when they beat Manawatu by 159 runs, with centuries to Duncan Drew and Darren Broom. Their next victory was in February 2016, when they beat Buller by 133 runs, Francois Mostert taking 13 wickets for 53. This match was notable in that Buller and North Otago were the two Hawke Cup teams with the smallest population bases. North Otago's third victory was over Nelson by 250 runs in February 2021.

North Otago players are eligible to represent Otago in the Plunket Shield. Of those who have done so, some have also played for New Zealand, including John Reid and David Sewell.

== Senior teams ==
The Borton Cup has been awarded since 1920 to the winners of the North Otago senior competition. Six clubs currently compete:

- Albion (Centennial Outer Oval)
- Glenavy (Glenavy Domain)
- Oamaru (Centennial Oval)
- St Kevin's College/Waitaki Boys' High School (combined team)
- Union (King George Park)
- Valley (Weston Park)
