= Hawke Cup =

New Zealand cricket competition

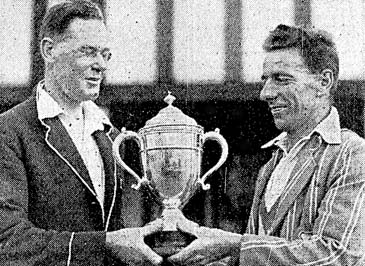
Edgar Neale (captain of Nelson, L) receives the Hawke Cup from Sydney Badeley (captain of South Auckland, R) in January 1933.

The Hawke Cup is a non-first-class cricket competition for New Zealand's district associations. Apart from 1910–11, 1912–13 and 2000–01, the competition has always been on a challenge basis. To win the Hawke Cup, the challengers must beat the holders, either outright or on the first innings in a drawn match, on the holders' home ground.

Teams from New Zealand's four main centres, Auckland, Wellington, Christchurch and Dunedin, have not usually competed for the Hawke Cup, although they did participate in the latter half of the 1990s. They were excluded again from the 2000–01 season.

From 2000 to 2010 the team from Hamilton, New Zealand's fourth-largest urban area, was the most successful. Since then the title has changed hands numerous times, Manawatu, Hawke's Bay, Bay of Plenty and Canterbury Country being prominent. In 2012–13 Hamilton conceded the highest-ever score in the Hawke Cup of 701 against Bay of Plenty. This record score was equalled again by Bay of Plenty against Counties Manukau during their first defence of the Hawke Cup in 2017. Owing to COVID-19 restrictions, the last two matches of the 2021–22 competition were postponed until the 2022–23 season.

== Origin ==
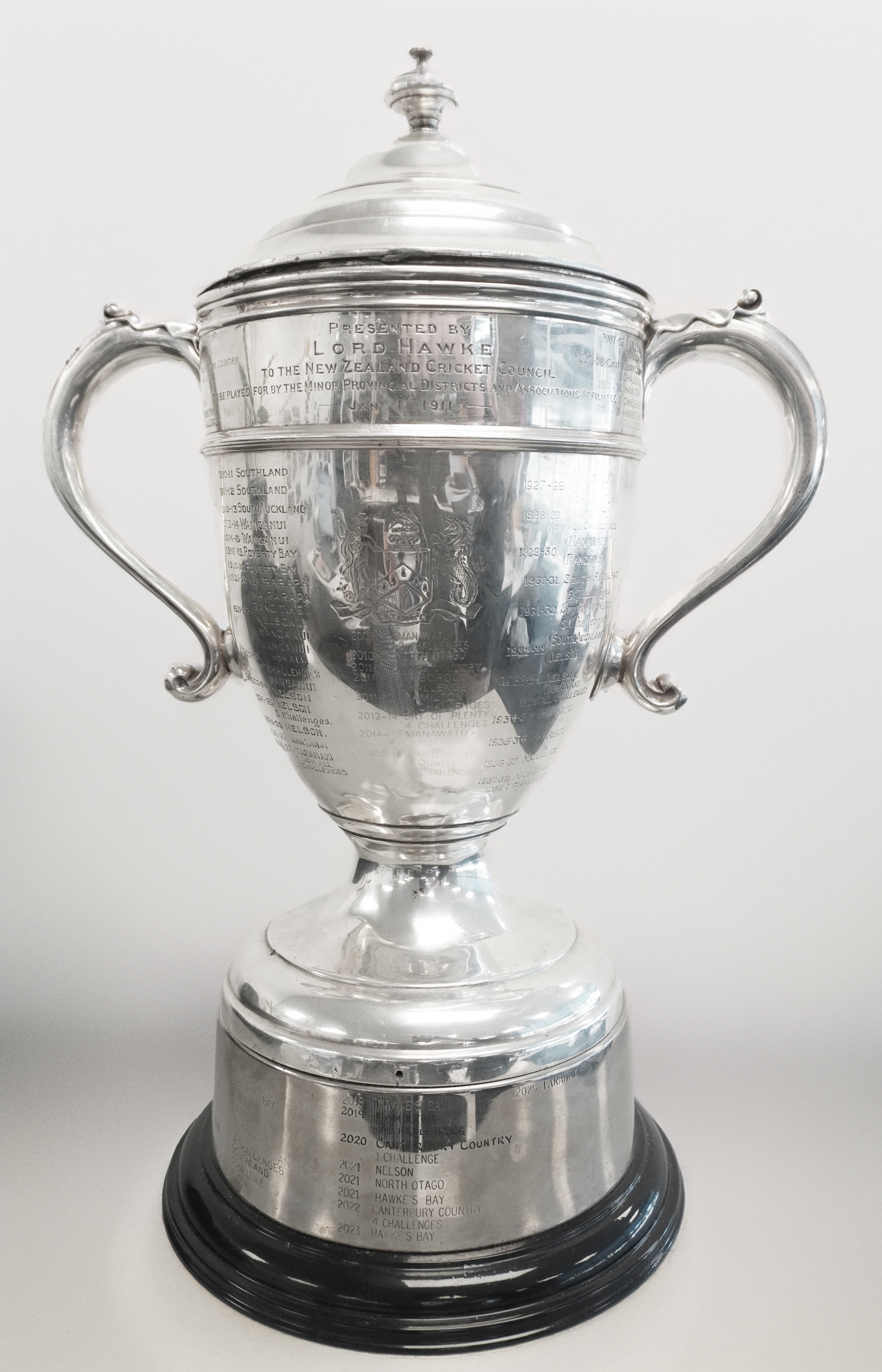
The Hawke Cup in 2025

The Plunket Shield, New Zealand's premier cricket competition for its first-class teams, was inaugurated in 1907. In 1910 Lord Hawke donated a challenge cup for competition among the minor associations. The first match, in December 1910, resulted in a victory to Manawatu over Wairarapa. The first holders, decided in the final match of the 1910–11 competition, were Southland.

As the number of minor associations grew, it became necessary to restrict the number of challenge matches. Beginning with the 1924–25 competition, when there were 18 minor associations, elimination or qualifying matches have been played to determine which associations should have the right to challenge the holders.

== Title holders ==
=== 1910–11 to 1999–2000 ===
| Season | Challenge matches | Holders after each challenge |
|---|---|---|
| 1910–11 | – | Southland |
| 1911–12 | 1 | Southland |
| 1912–13 | – | South Auckland |
| 1913–14 | 3 | Wanganui |
| 1914–15 | 3 | Wanganui |
| 1918–19 | 1 | Poverty Bay |
| 1919–20 | 3 | Poverty Bay |
| 1920–21 | 2 | Poverty Bay, Wairarapa |
| 1921–22 | 6 | Wairarapa, Rangitikei, Nelson, Wanganui |
| 1922–23 | 5 | Wanganui |
| 1923–24 | 3 | Wanganui, Nelson |
| 1924–25 | 5 | Nelson |
| 1925–26 | 5 | Nelson, Wanganui |
| 1926–27 | 4 | Wanganui, Taranaki |
| 1927–28 | 6 | Taranaki, Wanganui, Manawatu |
| 1928–29 | 3 | Manawatu |
| 1929–30 | 5 | Manawatu, Rangitikei |
| 1930–31 | 5 | South Auckland |
| 1931–32 | 5 | South Auckland |
| 1932–33 | 4 | South Auckland, Nelson |
| 1933–34 | 5 | Nelson, Taranaki |
| 1934–35 | 5 | Taranaki, Manawatu |
| 1935–36 | 4 | Manawatu |
| 1936–37 | 5 | Manawatu |
| 1937–38 | 4 | Manawatu, South Auckland |
| 1938–39 | 4 | Waikato |
| 1939–40 | 5 | Waikato, Manawatu |
| 1945–46 | 3 | Manawatu |
| 1946–47 | 5 | Manawatu, Hawke's Bay |
| 1947–48 | 3 | Hawke's Bay, Wanganui |
| 1948–49 | 4 | Hutt Valley |
| 1949–50 | 5 | Hutt Valley, Hawke's Bay |
| 1950–51 | 5 | Hawke's Bay, Wairarapa, Waikato |
| 1951–52 | 5 | Nelson |
| 1952–53 | 5 | Nelson, Wanganui |
| 1953–54 | 5 | Wanganui |
| 1954–55 | 5 | Wanganui |
| 1955–56 | 5 | Wanganui, Hutt Valley, Northland |
| 1956–57 | 5 | Waikato |
| 1957–58 | 5 | Waikato |
| 1958–59 | 4 | Nelson |
| 1959–60 | 4 | Nelson |
| 1960–61 | 5 | Nelson |
| 1961–62 | 4 | Nelson |
| 1962–63 | 4 | Nelson |
| 1963–64 | 5 | Nelson |
| 1964–65 | 5 | Nelson, Manawatu |
| 1965–66 | 5 | Manawatu |
| 1966–67 | 5 | Manawatu, North Canterbury, Nelson |
| 1967–68 | 5 | Hutt Valley, Marlborough, Hawke's Bay |
| 1968–69 | 5 | Hawke's Bay, Waikato |
| 1969–70 | 5 | Waikato, Southland |
| 1970–71 | 4 | Taranaki |
| 1971–72 | 5 | Taranaki |
| 1972–73 | 5 | Taranaki, Southland |
| 1973–74 | 4 | Southland |
| 1974–75 | 4 | Southland |
| 1975–76 | 4 | Southland |
| 1976–77 | 4 | Southland, Wairarapa |
| 1977–78 | 4 | Wairarapa |
| 1978–79 | 4 | Wairarapa, Nelson |
| 1979–80 | 4 | Nelson |
| 1980–81 | 4 | Nelson |
| 1981–82 | 4 | Nelson |
| 1982–83 | 5 | Northland, Hawke's Bay |
| 1983–84 | 4 | Hawke's Bay, Northland, Nelson |
| 1984–85 | 5 | Nelson |
| 1985–86 | 5 | Nelson, Hawke's Bay, Bay of Plenty |
| 1986–87 | 5 | Bay of Plenty, Hawke's Bay, Bay of Plenty, Southland |
| 1987–88 | 5 | Southland, North Canterbury, Taranaki |
| 1988–89 | 5 | Northland, Southland |
| 1989–90 | 5 | Southland |
| 1990–91 | 5 | Southland |
| 1991–92 | 5 | Southland, Northland, Nelson |
| 1992–93 | 5 | Nelson, Canterbury Country, Manawatu |
| 1993–94 | 5 | Manawatu, Marlborough, Taranaki |
| 1994–95 | 6 | Taranaki |
| 1995–96 | 5 | Central Otago, Nelson, Hutt Valley |
| 1996–97 | 5 | Nelson, Auckland-Manukau, Bay of Plenty |
| 1997–98 | 5 | Wellington City, Manawatu, Auckland-Waitakere, Northland |
| 1998–99 | 5 | Northland, Wellington City, Canterbury Country |
| 1999–2000 | 5 | South Canterbury, Dunedin Metropolitan |

From 1985–86 to 1994–95 the competition was called the U-Bix Cup; from 1995–96 to 1997–98 it was the Fuji Xerox Cup; in 1998–99 it was the National District Championship.

=== 2000–01 to the present ===
| Season | Challenge matches | Holders after each challenge |
|---|---|---|
| 2000–01 | Semi-finals Hamilton v Canterbury Country, Hawke's Bay v Bay of Plenty, Final Hamilton v Hawke's Bay | Hamilton |
| 2001–02 | Hamilton v North Otago, Hamilton v Hawke's Bay, Hamilton v Northland, Hamilton v Canterbury Country, Hamilton v Manawatu | Hamilton, Manawatu |
| 2002–03 | Manawatu v Hawke's Bay, Hawke's Bay v Northland, Northland v Canterbury Country | Hawke's Bay, Northland |
| 2003–04 | Northland v Hamilton, Northland v Mid-Canterbury, Mid-Canterbury v Taranaki | Northland, Mid-Canterbury |
| 2004–05 | Mid-Canterbury v Canterbury Country, Canterbury Country v Nelson, Canterbury Country v Hamilton | Canterbury Country, Hamilton |
| 2005–06 | Hamilton v Taranaki, Hamilton v Northland, Hamilton v Southland | Hamilton |
| 2006–07 | Hamilton v Northland, Hamilton v Canterbury Country, Hamilton v Taranaki | Hamilton, Taranaki |
| 2007–08 | Taranaki v Canterbury Country, Canterbury Country v Hawke's Bay, Canterbury Country v Hamilton | Canterbury Country, Hamilton |
| 2008–09 | Hamilton v Hawke's Bay, Hawke's Bay v Northland, Hawke's Bay v Canterbury Country | Hawke's Bay |
| 2009–10 | Hawke's Bay v Manawatu, Manawatu v Bay of Plenty, Manawatu v Marlborough, Manawatu v North Otago | Manawatu, North Otago |
| 2010–11 | North Otago v Otago Country, Otago Country v Marlborough, Marlborough v Hawke's Bay, Marlborough v Hamilton | Otago Country, Marlborough, Hamilton |
| 2011–12 | Hamilton v Counties Manukau, Hamilton v Wairarapa, Hamilton v Nelson, Hamilton v Southland | Hamilton |
| 2012–13 | Hamilton v Bay of Plenty, Bay of Plenty v Manawatu, Bay of Plenty v Canterbury Country, Bay of Plenty v South Canterbury | Bay of Plenty |
| 2013–14 | Bay of Plenty v Hamilton, Bay of Plenty v Manawatu, Manawatu v Canterbury Country, Manawatu v Southland | Bay of Plenty, Manawatu |
| 2014–15 | Manawatu v Taranaki, Manawatu v Northland, Manawatu v Canterbury Country, Canterbury Country v North Otago | Manawatu, Canterbury Country |
| 2015–16 | Canterbury Country v Buller, Buller v North Otago, North Otago v Hawke's Bay, Hawke's Bay v Bay of Plenty | Buller, North Otago, Hawke's Bay, Bay of Plenty |
| 2016–17 | Bay of Plenty v Counties Manukau, Bay of Plenty v Hawke's Bay, Bay of Plenty v Nelson, Bay of Plenty v Southland | Bay of Plenty |
| 2017–18 | Bay of Plenty v Counties Manukau, Counties Manukau v Taranaki, Counties Manukau v Canterbury Country, Counties Manukau v Southland | Counties Manukau, Southland |
| 2018–19 | Southland v Mid Canterbury, Southland v Nelson, Nelson v Hawke's Bay, Hawke's Bay v Hamilton | Southland, Nelson, Hawke's Bay, Hamilton |
| 2019–20 | Hamilton v Bay of Plenty, Hamilton v Hawke's Bay, Hamilton v Canterbury Country, Canterbury Country v Otago Country | Hamilton, Canterbury Country |
| 2020–21 | Canterbury Country v Nelson, Nelson v North Otago, North Otago v Hawke's Bay, Hawke's Bay v Hamilton | Nelson, North Otago, Hawke's Bay |
| 2021–22 | Hawke's Bay v Manawatu, Hawke's Bay v Bay of Plenty | Hawke's Bay |
| 2022–23 | Hawke's Bay v Canterbury Country, Canterbury Country v Southland, Canterbury Country v Nelson, Canterbury Country v Otago Country | Canterbury Country |
| 2023–24 | Canterbury Country v Hawke's Bay, Hawke's Bay v Manawatu, Hawke's Bay v Counties Manukau, Hawke's Bay v Canterbury Country, Hawke's Bay v South Canterbury | Hawke's Bay |
| 2024–25 | Hawke's Bay v Taranaki, Taranaki v Hamilton, Taranaki v Canterbury Country, Taranaki v South Canterbury | Taranaki |
| 2025–26 | Taranaki v Hawke's Bay, Taranaki v Bay of Plenty, Bay of Plenty v Canterbury Country, Canterbury Country v South Canterbury | Taranaki, Bay of Plenty, Canterbury Country |

== Records ==
=== Teams ===
Nelson has the record for holding the Cup for the longest period and the most challenges. Between 1958 and 1965 Nelson resisted 28 challenges. Manawatu resisted 15 challenges between 1934 and 1938, as did Southland between 1989 and 1992.

The highest team score is 701, made by Bay of Plenty twice: in 2013 and 2017.

=== Players ===
Current players can usually play a maximum of four Hawke Cup challenge matches a season, and that is only for members of the team holding the Hawke Cup and defeating every challenger (first defence within their own zone and defeating the winners of the other three zones). Historically there have been between two and six challenge matches every season for the holders, so it has been difficult for players to build much of a record unless they have been part of a strong team and have had a lengthy career. Nevertheless, 19 players have scored 1000 runs and five players have taken 100 wickets.

==== Batting ====
| Player | Team(s) | Career | Mat | Inn | NO | HS | Runs | Ave |
|---|---|---|---|---|---|---|---|---|
| Ian Leggat | Nelson | 1948–68 | 38 | 56 | 1 | 130 | 1968 | 35.78 |
| Lawrie Reade | Nelson | 1958–73 | 35 | 57 | 2 | 117 | 1951 | 35.47 |
| Graeme Lowans | Nelson | 1958–73 | 30 | 48 | 1 | 130 | 1811 | 38.53 |
| Robert Anderson | Northland & Southland | 1970–77 | 16 | 31 | 6 | 255 | 1773 | 70.92 |
| Colin McVicar | Manawatu | 1935–54 | 28 | 44 | 1 | 180 | 1754 | 40.79 |
| Dave Spence | Hawke's Bay & Nelson | 1949–67 | 34 | 51 | 8 | 151 | 1574 | 36.60 |

The highest score in the competition is 272 not out, by Mick Kinzett for Nelson against Marlborough in the 1933–34 season.

==== Bowling ====
| Player | Team(s) | Career | Mat | Runs | Wkts | Ave |
|---|---|---|---|---|---|---|
| Chester Holland | Wanganui | 1912–28 | 24 | 2202 | 189 | 11.65 |
| Norman Gallichan | Manawatu | 1925–47 | 29 | 2053 | 177 | 11.59 |
| Ian Leggat | Nelson | 1948–68 | 38 | 2149 | 134 | 16.03 |
| Dave Spence | Hawke's Bay & Nelson | 1949–67 | 34 | 1697 | 110 | 15.42 |
| Gren Alabaster | Thames Valley & Southland | 1961–79 | 20 | 1508 | 102 | 14.78 |

The best bowling figures in an innings in a challenge match are 10 for 35 by Chester Holland for Wanganui against South Taranaki in 1922–23. Outside the challenge matches, the best bowling figures in an innings are 10 for 24 by Ben Stark for Marlborough in a qualifying match against West Coast in 2012–13.

== Current structure ==
There are four regional zones in the Hawke Cup.

| Zone 1 | Zone 2 | Zone 3 | Zone 4 |
|---|---|---|---|
| Hamilton | Hawke's Bay | Canterbury Country | Otago Country |
| Northland | Wairarapa | Marlborough | North Otago |
| Counties Manukau | Whanganui | Nelson | Southland |
| Bay of Plenty | Horowhenua Kapiti | Buller | South Canterbury |
| Poverty Bay | Manawatu | | Mid Canterbury |
| Waikato Valley | Taranaki | | |

After a round robin within each zone, the winners of each zone get a Hawke Cup Challenge as part of the challenge series against the current holders on a rotational basis. For example 2010-11 holders North Otago played the winner of their own zone (Otago Country) in the first challenge (or the second place team should they win their own zone) followed by challenges by the winners of zone 3, 2 and 1.

The team with the Hawke Cup at the end of the challenge series holds it for the winter. Hawke Cup games are played over three days. To win the Hawke Cup a challenger must beat the holder outright or win on the first innings on the holder's home ground.

== Teams ==
More than forty teams have competed for the Hawke Cup. In the following list, current teams are indicated in bold.

Many boundaries, both political-administrative and cricket-administrative, have been redrawn since the competition began. The Counties Manukau team, for example, succeeded the former Franklin team, but their districts are not identical.

| Team | Main centre | First season | Last season | Titles | Current status |
|---|---|---|---|---|---|
| Ashburton County | Ashburton | 1957–58 | 1983–84 | 0 | Now plays as Mid Canterbury |
| Auckland-Manukau | Auckland | 1995–96 | 1996–97 | 1 | Now part of Auckland Plunket Shield team |
| Auckland-Waitakere | Auckland | 1997–98 | 1999–2000 | 1 | Now part of Auckland Plunket Shield team |
| **Bay of Plenty** | Mount Maunganui | 1931–32 | Continuing | 6 | Current team |
| **Buller** | Westport | 1947–48 | Continuing | 1 | Current team |
| **Canterbury Country** | Rangiora | 1992–93 | Continuing | 8 | Current team (formerly known as North Canterbury) |
| Central Otago | Alexandra | 1963–64 | 2005–06 | 1 | Now plays as Otago Country |
| Counties | Pukekohe | 1979–80 | 1994–95 | 0 | Succeeded Franklin, and was succeeded by Counties Manukau |
| **Counties Manukau** | Manurewa | 2011–12 | Continuing | 1 | Current team (formerly known as Franklin, then Counties) |
| Dunedin Metropolitan | Dunedin | 1998–99 | 1999–2000 | 1 | Now part of Otago Plunket Shield team |
| Franklin | Pukekohe | 1957–58 | 1977–78 | 0 | Succeeded by Counties, and now plays as Counties Manukau |
| **Hamilton** | Hamilton | 1976–77 | Continuing | 5 | Current team (formerly part of Waikato and South Auckland) |
| **Hawke's Bay** | Napier | 1922–23 | Continuing | 12 | Current team |
| Horowhenua | Levin | 1965–66 | 1991–92 | 0 | Now plays as Horowhenua Kapiti |
| **Horowhenua Kapiti** | Levin | 2002–03 | Continuing | 0 | Current team (formerly played as Horowhenua) |
| Hutt Valley | Lower Hutt | 1947–48 | 1996–97 | 4 | Now part of Wellington Plunket Shield team |
| King Country | Taumarunui; Ōtorohanga | 1955–56 | 1972–73 | 0 | Now part of Waikato Valley |
| **Manawatu** | Palmerston North | 1910–11 | Continuing | 9 | Current team |
| **Marlborough** | Blenheim | 1912–13 | Continuing | 3 | Current team |
| **Mid Canterbury** | Ashburton | 1997–98 | Continuing | 1 | Current team (formerly known as Ashburton County) |
| Midlands | Taumarunui | 1975–76 | 1983–84 | 0 | Now part of Waikato Valley |
| **Nelson** | Nelson | 1921–22 | Continuing | 10 | Current team |
| North Auckland | Whangārei | 1938–39 | 1938–39 | 0 | Now named Northland |
| North Canterbury | Rangiora | 1963–64 | 1990–91 | 2 | Now named Canterbury Country |
| North Harbour | Auckland | 1994–95 | 1998–99 | 0 | Now part of Auckland Plunket Shield team |
| **North Otago** | Oamaru | 1958–59 | Continuing | 3 | Current team |
| North Taranaki | New Plymouth | 1910–11 | 1922–23 | 0 | Part of Taranaki since the 1920s |
| **Northland** | Whangārei | 1951–52 | Continuing | 7 | Current team |
| **Otago Country** | Alexandra | 2007–08 | Continuing | 1 | Current team (formerly known as Central Otago) |
| **Poverty Bay** | Gisborne | 1913–14 | Continuing | 1 | Current team |
| Rangitikei | Marton | 1910–11 | 1988–89 | 2 | Now part of Whanganui |
| South Auckland | Hamilton | 1912–13 | 1936–37 | 2 | Now divided into Waikato Valley and Hamilton |
| **South Canterbury** | Timaru | 1910–11 | Continuing | 1 | Current team |
| South Taranaki | Hawera | 1910–11 | 1922–23 | 0 | Part of Taranaki since the 1920s |
| Southern Hawke's Bay | Dannevirke | 1926–27 | 1991–92 | 0 | Now part of Manawatu |
| **Southland** | Invercargill | 1910–11 | Continuing | 6 | Current team |
| **Taranaki** | New Plymouth | 1926–27 | Continuing | 7 | Current team, formed from North Taranaki and South Taranaki in the 1920s |
| Thames Valley | Te Aroha; Paeroa | 1955–56 | 1983–84 | 0 | Now part of Waikato Valley |
| Waiapu | Waipiro Bay; Tokomaru Bay | 1930–31 | 1938–39 | 0 | Now part of Poverty Bay |
| Waikato | Hamilton | 1921–22 | 1974–75 | 4 | Now divided into Waikato Valley and Hamilton |
| **Waikato Valley** | Hamilton; Cambridge | 2013–14 | Continuing | 0 | Current team, superseding Waikato, South Auckland, Thames Valley, King Country and Midlands |
| **Wairarapa** | Masterton | 1910–11 | Continuing | 3 | Current team |
| Wellington City | Wellington | 1997–98 | 1998–99 | 2 | Now part of Wellington Plunket Shield team |
| West Coast | Greymouth | 1924–25 | 2009–10 | 0 | |
| **Whanganui** | Whanganui | 1912–13 | Continuing | 6 | Current team (formerly spelt Wanganui) |

== Team of the Century ==
In January 2011, to mark 100 years of Hawke Cup cricket, an official "Team of the Century" was named. Selection was based on the player's outstanding performances in the Hawke Cup and also on their contribution to their district while playing. In batting order:

- Mike Wright (wk) – Bay of Plenty
- Roger Pierce – Nelson
- Robert Anderson – Southland, Northland and Manawatu
- Richard Hoskin – Southland and Central Otago
- Brian Dunning – Northland
- Ian Leggat – Nelson and Hawke's Bay
- Barry Hampton – Nelson
- Dave Spence – Nelson
- Gren Alabaster (captain) – Southland
- Alistar Jordan – Taranaki
- Russell Merrin – North Canterbury
- Norman Gallichan (12th man) – Manawatu
