= Bay of Plenty cricket team =

New Zealand cricket team

Personnel
- Owner: Bay of Plenty Cricket Association

Team information
- Founded: 1931
- Home ground: Bay Oval, Mount Maunganui

History
- Hawke Cup wins: 6
- Official website: bopcricket.co.nz

The Bay of Plenty cricket team represents the Bay of Plenty region of New Zealand. It is one of the 21 teams from around New Zealand that compete in the Hawke Cup.

== History ==
Cricket has been played in the Bay of Plenty region since the 1860s and possibly earlier. A Tauranga Cricket Club was formed in 1868. A Bay of Plenty team, consisting of players from Tauranga, Ōpōtiki and Katikati, visited Auckland to play against four club teams over four days in December 1881.

The current Bay of Plenty Cricket Association, the first to cover the whole region, was formed in August 1931. It was the 23rd association to become affiliated with the New Zealand Cricket Council, and thus became eligible to compete in the Hawke Cup.

Bay of Plenty were outclassed in their first challenges for the Hawke Cup, losing by wide margins to South Auckland in March 1932 and to Waikato (the renamed South Auckland team) in December 1938. Bay of Plenty hosted an international touring team for the first time in February 1936 when the Marylebone Cricket Club played them in a one-day match at Rotorua.

The Rigden Shield was inaugurated in 1944–45 for matches between Bay of Plenty and Poverty Bay. Bay of Plenty won and held the Shield for the first two years.

Northern Districts, of which Bay of Plenty is one of the constituent associations, began playing in the Plunket Shield in 1956–57. The first Bay of Plenty player to represent Northern Districts in the Plunket Shield was Des Ferrow, who played in three matches in 1956–57 and one in 1957–58. The second was Maurice Langdon, who began a 25-match career for Northern Districts in 1957–58.

Cricket in the Bay of Plenty developed as the population increased in the second half of the 20th century. Bay of Plenty won the Hawke Cup for the first time in 1985–86, captained by the Test player Andy Roberts, who scored 117 in the victory over Hawke's Bay. The next season, after relinquishing the title to Hawke's Bay, Bay of Plenty became the first team to lose and regain the Hawke Cup in the same season when they beat Hawke's Bay again. Since then, Bay of Plenty have won the title in 1996–97, 2012–13, 2015–16 and 2025–26. They hold the record for the highest team score in the Hawke Cup: 701, which they have reached twice – in 2013 and 2017.

The Bay of Plenty Cricket Association set up the Bay of Plenty Cricket Trust (now called the Bay Oval Trust) in 2009 to develop the team's home ground, Bay Oval in Mount Maunganui. While it remains Bay of Plenty's home ground, it is also one of Northern Districts' grounds, and is now also an international venue, staging its first Test match in November 2019.

Bay of Plenty and the other five Northern Districts association teams compete each season in two-day matches for the Fergus Hickey Rosebowl. The winner has the right to challenge for the Hawke Cup. Bay of Plenty also compete in the Brian Dunning Cup, the 50-over competition among the six teams.

== Structure ==
Three sub-associations make up the Bay of Plenty regional association: Rotorua Cricket Association, centred in Rotorua, Taupo Cricket Association, centred in Taupō, and Western Bay of Plenty Cricket Association, centred in Tauranga. Eastern Bay of Plenty, formerly with three clubs, currently consists of only one club, Whakatane.
