= List of cricketers who were murdered =

List of cricketers

This is a chronological list of cricketers who were murdered. These cricketers played in first-class cricket, List A, or at a similar level. This list does not include those who were killed in wars. They are listed separately at List of cricketers who were killed during military service.

	Nationality	Player	Circumstances of death	Date of death	Notes	Reference
1	England	Edward Wright	Murdered in riots at Jamaica.	23 November 1904		
2	Australia	Claude Tozer	Also a medical doctor, he was shot and killed by a patient.	21 December 1920		
3	England	Robert Makant	Murdered whilst on duty in Kurdistan and buried in the Ma'Asker Al Raschid RAF Cemetery, Baghdad.	18 June 1922		
4	South Africa	Norman Reid	Shot dead by his wife.	5–6 June 1947	South African Test cricketer. Was originally reported as having died in 'tragic circumstances'. Investigations by Brian Bassano and David Frith revealed that Reid was shot in the head. His body was found in his bed on 18 June 1947. The death certificate concluded that Reid was shot by his wife "whilst of unsound mind".	
5	Rhodesia	Huntsman Williams	Killed in rocket attack on his vehicle in Rhodesia.	3 August 1978		
6	Trinidad and Tobago	Jeff Stollmeyer	Shot five times and beaten about the head by intruders at his Port-of-Spain home.	10 September 1989	Stollmeyer captained West Indies in 13 Test matches	
7	India	Muni Lal	Murdered along with his wife by burglars who broke into his house.	8 January 1990	Editor of Crickinia, an early Indian cricket annual, from 1939 to 1944, uncle of Arun Lal, Indian high commissioner in the West Indies and ambassador in Somalia	
8	Pakistan	Haseeb-ul-Hasan	Shot by an unknown gunman.	18 April 1990		
9	South Africa	William Strydom	Shot during a robbery.	20 February 1995		
10	Sri Lanka	Mahinda Jayaratne	Died two days after being shot by a gunman who arrived by motorcycle at his home.	15 March 1997		
11	South Africa	Ashley Harvey-Walker	Shot dead in a Johannesburg bar.	28 April 1997		
12	Sri Lanka	Wirantha Fernando	Killed by a mob.	17 April 2000	First to captain Colts Cricket Club at FC level	
13	South Africa	Francois Weideman	Shot during a robbery.	4 June 2001		
14	United States	Nezam Hafiz	Worked at the World Trade Center, New York during 9/11.	11 September 2001	First-class player for Guyana and later the US.	
15	New Zealand	Mark Parker	As a result of the Bali bombings.	12 October 2002		
16	Pakistan	Rahatullah	Shot.	11 February 2008		
17	Uganda	Charles Lwanga	Beaten to death with iron bars by unknown assailants.	2 November 2010	Played for Uganda in the 2001 ICC Trophy	
18	Namibia	Louis Vorster	Shot during an armed robbery.	18 April 2012		
19	United States	Errol Peart	Shot while helping the victim of an attempted robbery.	2 December 2012	Played for USA in the 1990 ICC Trophy	
20	Bangladesh	Kuntal Chandra	Body found in the outskirts of Dhaka.	2 December 2012		
21	South Africa	John Commins	Found dead in his home in Cape Town.	3 January 2013	Uncle of Test cricketer John Commins	
22	Bermuda	Fiqre Crockwell	Shot dead in Pembroke Parish, Bermuda.	20 June 2016		
23	Jamaica	William Haye	Shot dead in Jamaica.	18 March 2019		
24	Sri Lanka	Dinesh Schaffter	Found bound and gagged in his car in Borella, Sri Lanka.	16 December 2022	Son of Chandra Schaffter and brother of Prakash Schaffter	
25	Sri Lanka	Dhammika Niroshana	Shot dead outside his home.	17 July 2024	First class cricketer and former Sri Lanka U-19 captain.	

== Possibly murdered ==
No.	Player	Circumstances of death	Date of death	Notes	Player Profile
1	(England) Percy Hardy	Found dead on the floor of a lavatory at King's Cross station with his throat cut and a blood-stained knife by his side.	9 March 1916	Somerset history maintains Hardy committed suicide rather than be sent back to World War I battlefields.	
2	(India) Rajesh Peter	Found dead in his flat in New Delhi in suspicious circumstances.	16 November 1995	Indian first-class player	
3	(South Africa) Tertius Bosch	Believed to have died from Guillain–Barré syndrome, but post mortem suggested that he was poisoned. The case has now been closed and nothing was found.	14 February 2000	South African Test player	
4	(England) Bob Woolmer	Found dead in his hotel room in Kingston, Jamaica during the 2007 cricket World Cup. Originally believed to have been strangled but the investigation returned an open verdict, ruling out neither strangulation nor death by natural causes.	18 March 2007	Woolmer, a former English Test cricketer, was the coach of the Pakistan cricket team at the time of his death	
5	(Pakistan) Nauman Habib	Reportedly a victim of murder.	11 October 2011	Played 63 first-class and 30 List A matches in Pakistan	
