= New Zealand cricket team in Pakistan in 1976–77 =

International cricket tour

The New Zealand national cricket team toured Pakistan in October to November 1976 and played a three-match Test series against the Pakistan national cricket team. Pakistan won the Test series 2–0. New Zealand were captained by Glenn Turner and Pakistan by Mushtaq Mohammad.

== Tour matches summary ==
=== First tour match ===
2 – 4 October 1976
(3-day match)
Scorecard

North-West Frontier Province Chief Minister's XI	v	New Zealanders
275/6d (70 overs); Intikhab Alam 73; Peter Petherick 4/111 (22 overs)		255/4d (78 overs); Robert Anderson 103*; Farrukh Zaman 3/80 (23 overs)
240/3d (42 overs); Javed Miandad 138*; Richard Hadlee 2/52 (8 overs)		106 (34.2 overs); John Morrison 33; Farrukh Zaman 4/37 (9.2 overs)

North-West Frontier Province Chief Minister's XI won by 154 runs
Peshawar Club Ground, Peshawar
Umpires: Amanullah Khan and Khalid Aziz

- North-West Frontier Province Chief Minister's XI won the toss and decided to bat

=== Second tour match ===
6 – 8 October 1976
(3-day match)
Scorecard

ZA Bhutto's XI	v	New Zealanders
188 (39.3 overs); Majid Khan 34; Richard Hadlee 5/47 (11.3 overs)		151 (35.7 overs); John Morrison 46; Mushtaq Mohammad 5/17 (7.7 overs)
77/2 (15.4 overs); Zaheer Abbas 44*; Richard Hadlee 1/44 (7 overs)

Match drawn
Pindi Club Ground, Rawalpindi
Umpires: Shakoor Rana and Shujauddin

- ZA Bhutto's XI won the toss and decided to bat

=== First Test ===
9 – 13 October 1976
Scorecard

Pakistan	v	New Zealand
417 (80.5 overs); Asif Iqbal 166; Richard Hadlee 5/121 (19 overs)		157 (49.4 overs); Geoff Howarth 38; Intikhab Alam 4/35 (16.4 overs)
105/4 (18.7 overs); Sadiq Mohammad 38; Peter Petherick 2/26 (4.7 overs)		360 (f/o) (92.4 overs); Mark Burgess 111; Imran Khan 4/59 (21 overs)

Pakistan won by 6 wickets
Gaddafi Stadium, Lahore
Umpires: Amanullah Khan and Shujauddin

- Pakistan won the toss and elected to bat.
- 12 October was taken as a rest day.
- The match was scheduled for five days but completed in four.
- Robert Anderson, Warren Lees and Peter Petherick (all NZ), and Javed Miandad (PAK) made their Test debuts.

=== Only ODI ===
16 October 1976
Scorecard

New Zealand; 198/8 (35 overs)	v	Pakistan; 197/9 (35 overs)
Glenn Turner 67 (104); Javed Miandad 2/31 (6 overs)		Javed Miandad 47 (72); Lance Cairns 2/36 (7 overs)

New Zealand won by 1 run
Jinnah Park, Sialkot
Umpires: Javed Akhtar and Mahboob Shah
Player of the match: Glenn Turner (NZ)

- New Zealand won the toss and elected to bat.
- Robert Anderson, Murray Parker, Andy Roberts and Gary Troup (all NZ) made their ODI debuts.

=== Third tour match ===
17 – 19 October 1976
(3-day match)
Scorecard

New Zealanders	v	Punjab
230 (58.1 overs); Mark Burgess 78; Parvez Mir 4/39 (15 overs)		221/6d (46.3 overs); Mohsin Khan 123; David O'Sullivan 2/32 (7.3 overs)
299/5d (65 overs); John Parker 96; Sikander Bakht 3/55 (14 overs)		172 (44 overs); Farooq Shera 45; Peter Petherick 3/43 (14 overs)

New Zealanders won by 136 runs
Lyallpur Stadium, Lyallpur
Umpires: Gulzar Mir and Khizer Hayat

- New Zealanders won the toss and decided to bat

=== Second Test ===
23 – 27 October 1976
Scorecard

Pakistan	v	New Zealand
473/8d (128 overs); Sadiq Mohammad 103*; David O'Sullivan 2/92 (39 overs)		219 (73.7 overs); Glenn Turner 49; Imran Khan 3/41 (15 overs)
4/0 (0.5 overs); Sarfraz Nawaz 4*		254 (f/o) (80.4 overs); John Parker 82; Intikhab Alam 4/44 (20 overs)

Pakistan won by 10 wickets
Niaz Stadium, Hyderabad
Umpires: Amanullah Khan and Shakoor Rana

- Pakistan won the toss and elected to bat.
- 26 October was taken as a rest day.
- The match was scheduled for five days but completed in four.
- Farrukh Zaman (PAK) made his Test debut.

=== Third Test ===
30 October – 4 November 1976
Scorecard

Pakistan	v	New Zealand
565/9d (105.2 overs); Javed Miandad 206; Richard Hadlee 4/138 (20.2 overs)		468 (103.5 overs); Warren Lees 152; Intikhab Alam 3/76 (20.7 overs)
290/5d (47.4 overs); Javed Miandad 85; David O'Sullivan 2/96 (17 overs)		262/7 (79.6 overs); Warren Lees 46; Sikander Bakht 2/38 (8 overs)

Match drawn
National Stadium, Karachi
Umpires: Shakoor Rana and Shujauddin

- Pakistan won the toss and elected to bat.
- 2 November was taken as a rest day.
- Murray Parker (NZ), and Shahid Israr and Sikander Bakht (both PAK) made their Test debuts.
