= Schaffter =

Schaffter is a surname. Notable people with the surname include:

- Chandra Schaffter (born 1930), Sri Lankan businessman
- Dinesh Schaffter (1971–2022), Sri Lankan businessman
- Olivier Schaffter (born 1964), Swiss judoka
- Prakash Schaffter (born 1967) Sri Lankan cricketer
