= David O'Sullivan (cricketer, born 1944) =

New Zealand cricketer

Personal information
- Full name: David Robert O'Sullivan
- Born: 16 November 1944 (age 81); Palmerston North, New Zealand
- Batting: Right-handed
- Bowling: Slow left-arm orthodox

International information
- National side: New Zealand (1973–1976)
- Test debut (cap 125): 7 February 1973 v Pakistan
- Last Test: 26 November 1976 v India
- ODI debut (cap 16): 30 March 1974 v Australia
- Last ODI: 16 October 1976 v Pakistan

Domestic team information
- Years: Team
- 1966/67–1973/74: Manawatu
- 1971–1973: Hampshire
- 1972/73–1984/85: Central Districts
- 1974–1977: Durham
- 1975/76–1984/85: Hawke's Bay

Career statistics
Competition	Test	ODI	FC	LA
Matches	11	3	136	53
Runs scored	158	2	2,174	261
Batting average	9.29	2.00	15.41	10.87
100s/50s	0/0	0/0	0/3	0/30
Top score	23*	1*	70*	32
Balls bowled	2,744	168	36,558	1,503
Wickets	18	2	523	56
Bowling average	68.00	61.50	25.91	26.83
5 wickets in innings	1	0	28	0
10 wickets in match	0	0	4	0
Best bowling	5/148	1/38	6/26	4/13
Catches/stumpings	2/–	0/–	46/–	12/–
- Source: Cricinfo, 15 April 2017

David Robert O'Sullivan (born 16 November 1944) is a former New Zealand cricketer. A left-arm spin bowler, he played 11 Tests and three One Day Internationals for New Zealand between 1973 and 1976. He played first-class cricket from 1971 to 1985.

== Early career ==
Born in Palmerston North and educated at Palmerston North Boys' High School, David O'Sullivan began playing as a left-arm spin bowler for his local team Manawatu in the Hawke Cup in 1966–67. In 1970 he went to England and played for Hampshire Second XI. In 1971 he took 50 wickets at an average of 14.80, and was "the backbone of the county's second eleven championship success", the team going through the season unbeaten. He played his first first-class match for Hampshire in 1971, against the touring Indians, bowling 64.4 overs in the match and taking 5 for 116 and 3 for 27. Hampshire contracted him to play with the senior team in 1972.

He had a sound season in 1972, playing 11 matches for Hampshire and taking 29 wickets at 29.86. He played his first first-class matches in New Zealand in 1972–73, taking 19 wickets at 22.73 in five Plunket Shield matches for Central Districts. He was selected in the New Zealand team to play in the Coca-Cola Knockout Cup in Australia in January 1973, taking 4 for 26 off eight eight-ball overs in New Zealand's victory in the semi-final, winning the man of the match award, and 3 for 29 off six overs in the final, which New Zealand also won.

== Test career ==
O'Sullivan made his Test debut a few days later in the Second Test against Pakistan, playing alongside Hedley Howarth, who had been New Zealand's chief spin bowler since 1969. He took no wickets in an innings defeat and was left out of the Third Test team.

He was overlooked for the 1973 tour of England in favour of Eric Gillott, and returned to Hampshire. He played a part in their County Championship victory, taking 47 wickets in 13 matches at 20.59, including 11 wickets for 41 against Nottinghamshire. Hampshire wanted to retain him for 1974 but decided to choose Andy Roberts as their second overseas player instead. O'Sullivan played for Durham in the Minor Counties Championship from 1974 to 1977.

Howarth was unavailable for the tour of Australia in 1973–74, and O'Sullivan took his spot in the Test team as senior spinner. He took only five wickets at 56.00 in the four state matches before the First Test, but was chosen for all three Tests. He took no wickets in the First, did not bowl in the Second, then took 5 for 148 off 35.5 eight-ball overs in the Third, which Australia won by an innings. Howarth returned to the Test team for the return series in New Zealand immediately afterwards, replacing O'Sullivan.

O'Sullivan had steady seasons for Central Districts in 1974–75 and 1975–76. He played in the First Test against India in 1975–76 alongside Howarth, but took no wickets and was left out of the team for the next two Tests. When the side to tour Pakistan and India in late 1976 was announced Howarth was again unavailable, and the spin bowling was in the hands of O'Sullivan (five wickets in five Tests so far) and Peter Petherick, who had yet to play a Test. O'Sullivan played in all six Tests, bowling 273 overs and taking 13 wickets at 61.46, with best figures of 3 for 125 (off 50 overs) in the first innings of the Second Test against India.

== Later career ==
Howarth returned to the team for the Tests against Australia early in 1977. In 1977–78, when England toured, O'Sullivan took 5 for 14 in the second innings and top-scored in the first innings with 31 in the tied match between the English team and Central Districts. However, the young left-arm spinner Stephen Boock edged out both Howarth and O'Sullivan from the Test team, and neither of them played any further Tests.

O'Sullivan continued to play successfully in New Zealand domestic cricket until the 1984–85 season when at the age of 40 he bowled more than 400 overs and took 38 wickets at 27.60. In his career he took 392 first-class wickets for Central Districts, which as of 2025 is still the Central Districts record.
