= Niroshana =

Niroshana is both a given name and a surname. Notable people with the name include:

- Niroshana Amarasinghe (born 1982), Sri Lankan cricketer
- Dhammika Niroshana (1983–2024), Sri Lankan cricketer
