= Muni Lal =

Indian diplomat and cricketer (1913–1990)

Personal information
- Full name: Dhir Muni Lal
- Born: 11 January 1913; Lahore, India
- Died: 8 January 1990 (aged 76); Noida, India
- Batting: Right-handed
- Relatives: Jagdish Lal (brother); Arun Lal (nephew); Akash Lal (son)

Domestic team information
- Years: Team
- 1934/35–1945/46: Northern India
- 1935/36–1943/44: Southern Punjab

Career statistics
Competition	First-class
Matches	20
Runs scored	815
Batting average	23.97
100s/50s	0/5
Top score	90
Balls bowled	12
Wickets	0
Bowling average	–
5 wickets in innings	–
10 wickets in match	–
Best bowling	–
Catches/stumpings	11/–
- Source: CricketArchive, 30 January 2022

Dhir Muni Lal (11 January 1913 – 8 January 1990) was an Indian diplomat and first class cricketer.

Lal was a right-handed opening batsman and played his cricket with both Southern Punjab and Northern India. He played a two-day match against M.C.C. in 1933-34 and his last first class match was against West Indies in 1948-49. Lal also played for the Punjab University, Lahore. He made five first-class half centuries, with his highest score of 90 made in the 1937-38 Ranji Trophy. Outside the playing field, he was the editor of Crickinia, an early Indian cricket annual. His son Akash Lal was a first class cricketer, cricket administrator and commentator while his nephew Arun Lal played Test cricket for India.

Muni Lal had a distinguished academic and diplomatic career. He completed M.Phil. in University of the Punjab in 1935. He worked for the Civil and Military Gazette till 1947. After the partition of India, he joined the Indian Foreign Service. He served in Pakistan, Australia, United States, Indonesia and the United Kingdom. He was the High commissioner to West Indies and ambassador to Somalia. In his last first class match, Lal had scored 0 and 4, dismissed in both innings by Gerry Gomez. When he moved to Trinidad as the high commissioner, Gomez was one of the first people who he met there.

During a burglary at his home in 1990, Lal and his wife were murdered by the intruders.

== See also ==
- List of cricketers who were murdered
