= Akash Lal =

Indian cricketer (1940–2026)

Personal information
- Born: 6 October 1940; Kapurthala, Punjab, British India
- Died: 10 August 2026 (aged 85)
- Batting: Right-handed
- Role: Opening batsman
- Relatives: Muni Lal (father), Arun Lal (cousin), Jagdish Lal (uncle)

Domestic team information
- Years: Team
- 1957/58: Patiala
- 1959/60–1968/69: Delhi
- 1969/70–1975/76: Punjab

Career statistics
Competition	First-class
Matches	94
Runs scored	5,622
Batting average	41.64
100s/50s	15/26
Top score	209*
Balls bowled	447
Wickets	6
Bowling average	50.50
5 wickets in innings	0
10 wickets in match	0
Best bowling	2/21
Catches/stumpings	55/–
- Source: ESPNcricinfo, 30 December 2015

Akash Lal (6 October 1940 – 10 August 2026) was an Indian first-class cricketer who mainly played for Delhi and Punjab, and also served as Indian team selector.

== Life and career ==
Akash Lal was born on 6 October 1940 in Kapurthala, Punjab. His father Muni Lal was also a first-class cricketer who played in the 1930s and 1940s. His uncle Jagdish Lal, father of Indian cricketer Arun Lal, had also played first-class cricket for various teams.

Lal was a right-handed opening batsman who made his first-class debut for Patiala in the 1957/58 season. He switched to Delhi for the 1959/60 season and played ten seasons for them. He captained Delhi for three seasons from 1965/66. He was in contention for getting selected for the Indian team in 1966. He scored 82 and 4 in a tour match against West Indies at Delhi, but due to his struggle against Garry Sobers' spin bowling and a dropped catch, he was not selected. He moved to Punjab before the 1969/70 season and represented them until the 1975/76 season.

After retirement, Lal became a selector for the Indian national cricket team. He was part of the five-member selection panel that picked Sachin Tendulkar in the Indian team at the age of 16 for his first international tour against Pakistan. Lal was one of the three members of the panel who voted in favour of Tendulkar's selection.
