= Mac Anderson =

New Zealand cricketer

- Mac Anderson (left) and Walter Hadlee, Wellington 1946

Personal information
- Full name: William McDougall Anderson
- Born: 8 October 1919; Westport, New Zealand
- Died: 21 December 1979 (aged 60); Christchurch, New Zealand
- Batting: Left-handed
- Bowling: Legbreak, googly
- Relatives: Robert Anderson (son); Tim Anderson (grandson)

International information
- National side: New Zealand
- Only Test (cap 34): 29 March 1946 v Australia

Domestic team information
- Years: Team
- 1938/39–1949/50: Canterbury

Career statistics
Competition	Test	First-class
Matches	1	37
Runs scored	5	1,973
Batting average	2.50	34.61
100s/50s	0/0	2/13
Top score	4	137
Balls bowled	–	1,031
Wickets	–	18
Bowling average	–	38.16
5 wickets in innings	–	1
10 wickets in match	–	0
Best bowling	–	5/90
Catches/stumpings	1/–	24/–
- Source: Cricinfo, 1 April 2017

William McDougall "Mac" Anderson (8 October 1919 – 21 December 1979) was a New Zealand cricketer who played in one Test match in 1946. His son Robert Anderson played international cricket for New Zealand in the 1970s.

== Cricket career ==
Anderson was educated at Christchurch Boys' High School. He played for Canterbury from 1938–39 to 1949–50 as a batsman and occasional leg-spinner.

He made his highest score in 1945–46, when he scored 137 in 396 minutes opening the batting for Canterbury against Otago. He made 61 for Canterbury against the Australians shortly afterwards, and was selected for the single Test against Australia in Wellington. He was one of six New Zealanders to make their Test debuts in this match; for five of them, including Anderson, it was their only Test. He made 4 and 1.

Anderson made 285 runs at 71.25 in the 1948–49 Plunket Shield with three 50s, and played in the trial match, but was not selected for the subsequent tour to England. Anderson later served as a selector for Canterbury and, for two years, for the New Zealand Test team.

Anderson married Ruth Wickham in Christchurch in April 1947. They lived in Christchurch, where he worked as a salesman. He died in December 1979, aged 60.
