= Tim Anderson (cricketer) =

New Zealand cricketer

Personal information
- Full name: Timothy Robert Anderson
- Born: 13 December 1978 (age 47); Palmerston North, New Zealand
- Batting: Right-handed
- Bowling: Legbreak
- Relatives: Robert Anderson (father); Mac Anderson (grandfather)

Domestic team information
- Years: Team
- 1997/98–2002/03: Central Districts

Career statistics
Competition	First-class	List A
Matches	16	1
Runs scored	56	2
Batting average	5.09	2.00
100s/50s	0/0	0/0
Top score	14	2
Balls bowled	2,713	25
Wickets	42	–
Bowling average	36.19	–
5 wickets in innings	1	–
10 wickets in match	0	–
Best bowling	6/37	–
Catches/stumpings	4/–	0/–
- Source: Cricinfo, 17 January 2022

Timothy Robert Anderson (born 13 December 1978) is a New Zealand former cricketer. He played in one List A and 16 first-class matches for Central Districts from 1997 to 2003.

A leg-spin bowler, Anderson's best first-class bowling figures were 6 for 37 against Auckland in February 2001. He played Hawke Cup cricket for Northland and Nelson between 1995 and 2004.

Anderson completed a business degree at Lincoln University, worked for a time in banking, then returned to Northland to start a mortgage-broking company in Whangārei with his father, the former Test cricketer Robert Anderson. As of 2024 he is the director of Zest Brokers in Whangārei, where he lives with his wife and their three children.
