= Robert Anderson (New Zealand cricketer) =

New Zealand cricketer (1948–2025)

Personal information
- Full name: Robert Wickham Anderson
- Born: 2 October 1948; Christchurch, New Zealand
- Died: 1 June 2025 (aged 76); Christchurch, New Zealand
- Nickname: Jumbo
- Batting: Right-handed
- Bowling: Leg-break
- Relatives: Mac Anderson (father); Tim Anderson (son)

International information
- National side: New Zealand (1976–1978)
- Test debut (cap 134): 9 October 1976 v Pakistan
- Last Test: 24 August 1978 v England
- ODI debut (cap 23): 16 October 1976 v Pakistan
- Last ODI: 15 July 1978 v England

Domestic team information
- Years: Team
- 1967/68: Canterbury
- 1969/70: Northern Districts
- 1971/72–1976/77: Otago
- 1977/78–1981/82: Central Districts

Career statistics
Competition	Test	ODI	FC	LA
Matches	9	2	111	21
Runs scored	423	16	5,609	423
Batting average	23.50	16.00	30.65	22.26
100s/50s	0/3	0/0	8/28	0/1
Top score	92	12	155	66*
Balls bowled	–	–	298	–
Wickets	–	–	5	–
Bowling average	–	–	30.80	–
5 wickets in innings	–	–	0	–
10 wickets in match	–	–	0	–
Best bowling	–	–	4/49	–
Catches/stumpings	1/–	1/–	79/–	8/–
- Source: Cricinfo, 2 April 2017

Robert Wickham Anderson (2 October 1948 – 1 June 2025) was a New Zealand cricketer who played nine Test matches and two One Day Internationals for the New Zealand national cricket team between 1976 and 1978. Anderson was born in Christchurch in 1948.

== Domestic career ==
Anderson played mainly as a top-order batsman. He began his first-class cricket career in 1967–68 for Canterbury, playing in three Plunket Shield matches for the side during the season. He played for Northern Districts during the 1969–1970 season, including against the touring Australian side before moving to Otago ahead of the 1970–71 season. Anderson played in 35 first-class and 9 List A matches for Otago and was selected for New Zealand whilst at the side. He moved to play for Central Districts in 1977, playing a further 30 first-class and 9 List A matches for the side before retiring after the 1981–82 season. His highest score was 155 for the New Zealand touring team against Scotland in 1978.

Anderson also played Hawke Cup cricket for Southland, Northland and Manawatu between 1970 and 1980. When Southland successfully defended the title against four challenges in 1973–74 he scored 561 runs at an average of 93.50 with three centuries. In the 16 Hawke Cup challenge matches he played, he scored 1,773 runs at an average of 70.92. His 255 against Ashburton County in February 1977 is still the highest score for Southland. He was named in the Hawke Cup Team of the Century in 2011.

== International career ==
Anderson toured England with New Zealand in 1973 but did not play in any of the international matches on the tour. He made his Test match debut against Pakistan on New Zealand's 1976–77 tour, playing in all three Test matches as well as the sole One Day International (ODI) on the tour. He scored 92 in the opening match, scoring 183 for the fifth wicket in 155 minutes with Mark Burgess, but did not retain his place for the tour of India which followed.

Anderson played in all three home Tests against England in 1977–78. In the First Test, New Zealand's first-ever Test victory over England, he scored 28 and 26 (New Zealand's top score in the second innings) in the low-scoring match. He also played in all three Tests on New Zealand's tour to England in 1978 as well as one of the two ODIs on the tour, but scored only 26 Test runs in six innings; Wisden called his performance one of the "biggest disappointments".

== Personal life and death ==
Anderson's father, Mac Anderson, played one Test match for New Zealand in 1946. Robert's son Tim played for Central Districts as a leg-spinner from 1997–98 to 2002–03. In 2008 Robert and Tim started a mortgage-broking company.

Anderson died in Christchurch on 1 June 2025, at the age of 76.
