= Dinesh Schaffter =

Sri Lankan cricketer and businessperson

Personal information
- Born: 1 May 1971; Colombo, Western Province, Sri Lanka
- Died: 15 December 2022 (aged 51); National Hospital of Sri Lanka, Colombo
- Batting: Left-handed
- Bowling: Slow left arm orthodox
- Relatives: Chandra Schaffter (father); Prakash Schaffter (brother)

Domestic team information
- Years: Team
- Antonians Sports Club
- Moors Sports Club

Career statistics
Competition	FC
Matches	16
Runs scored	153
Batting average	15.30
100s/50s	0/0
Top score	26
Balls bowled	1896
Wickets	27
Bowling average	32.22
5 wickets in innings	1
10 wickets in match	0
Best bowling	6/58
Catches/stumpings	12/-
- Source: Cricinfo, 1 November 2023

Dinesh Schaffter (1 May 1971 – 15 December 2022) was a Sri Lankan businessman, philanthropist and former first-class cricketer. He was a renowned businessman and served as the director of Janashakthi Group PLC and also served as managing director of First Capital Holdings. He died in December 2022 leading to speculations and rumours regarding the nature of his death. In November 2023, the court concluded that he was murdered.

His father Chandra Schaffter and brother Prakash Schaffter also played first-class cricket before becoming business professionals.

== Career ==
Schaffter was very much involved in numerous sporting disciplines including cricket and tennis from his school days. He plied his trade initially in cricket at domestic level by turning up for Moors Sports Club and played 16 first-class cricket matches. He took a career best haul of 6/58 which also included the priced wicket of Marvan Atapattu during a first-class match against Singhalese Sports Club. He had the distinction of opening the batting as well as batting as a tail-ender at number eleven position in first-class level. He also played for Finchley Cricket Club in the Middlesex League.

He completed Chartered Institute of Management Accountants training at the age of 18. Schaffter also thrived in corporate industry and took a huge risk by buying First Capital Holdings from Singer Sri Lanka. His decision paid dividends as the company reaped profits in the long run. He became the managing director of First Capital Holdings. He also served as non independent non executive director of Janashakthi Insurance.

He began pursuing the sport of tennis seriously in the latter part of his life and he competed in SSC Open Tennis Championship where he qualified to semi-finals in the over-45 doubles category. He also volunteered by engaging in fundraising projects and sponsorships for several local tennis competitions as well as International Wheelchair Tennis competitions. SSC Open Ranking Tennis Championship 2023 introduced the inaugural Dinesh Schaffter Spirit of Tennis Award in recognition of Schaffter's contribution towards tennis.

== Death ==
Schaffter was found with his limbs bound and choked inside the car which was owned by him. He was reportedly found severely injured inside his car as he was tied up in the driving seat of the car at the Borella Public Cemetery. He died on 15 December 2022 due to cardiac arrest during night time after being admitted under the intensive care unit at the National Hospital of Sri Lanka in Colombo.

Prior to his death, he had reportedly contacted his wife indicating that he was on his way to Borella on 15 December 2022. He had informed his personal secretary that he was going to meet former cricket commentator Brian Thomas. However, according to Sri Lanka Police, Schaffter thereafter did not attend to any of the phone calls made by his wife and it eventually raised eyebrows to know about his whereabouts. His wife then contacted his workplace by informing about the situation and urged them to look for Schaffter. She managed to track the phone of Schaffter through using Global Positioning System technology and managed to identify the location where Schaffter was seen. As a result, one of the employees of the workplace eventually arrived to the Public Cemetery where the employee verified the identity of Schaffter after realising that the latter was found bound and bruised inside the car. The employee alongside the assistance of the cemetery worker with whom the former accompanied to admit Schaffter to the Colombo National Hospital.

His death provoked shockwaves all over the country and it even prompted certain high-ranking officials to take swift action to know the in-depth information regarding the sudden untimely mysterious demise of Schaffter. Public Security Minister Tiran Alles ordered the top brass of Sri Lanka Police including the Inspector General of Police and other senior ranking police officers to inquire into the progress of the investigation regarding the death of Schaffter. The Homicide and Organized Crime division of the Criminal Investigation Department intervened to conduct investigations over his death. A team representing the Criminal Investigation Department arrived to Borella Cemetery on 16 December 2022 where his death was reported and the team carried out further inquiries.

The CID investigations insisted that Schaffter had apparently left home at around 2pm on 15 December 2022 and his murder has taken place well within half an hour since his departure from his home. In December 2022, Colombo Additional Magistrate ordered travel ban on Brian Thomas as part of the investigation proceedings. It was later revealed that Thomas was reportedly owing Schaffter for a sum of around 1.4 billion and Schaffter had made apparently made complaints to the CID about Thomas way back in 2019 for not repaying back the due on time.

On 8 February 2023, Hulftsdorp Magistrate Court was informed that Schaffter's death was a result of the ingestion of cyanide.

On 27 February 2023, a five-member panel of medical experts to inquire into the matter revolving the mysterious death of Schaffter to ascertain whether his death was caused by murder or suicide. In April 2023, Colombo Chief Magistrate's Court ordered government analyst to conduct DNA test on Brian Thomas since he was one of the key suspects behind the murder case.

In May 2023, his body was exhumed under armed tight security based on a special request made by the Expert Panel Committee appointed by the court in order to verify the true nature behind the cause of his death. In September 2023, the exhumed body was returned to the family members of Schaffter.

On 1 November 2023, Colombo Magistrate's court concluded that the death of Dinesh Schaffter was a murder. The court further informed that the five-member expert panel which was appointed to investigate the death of Schaffter had arrived to such conclusion by confirming that his death was caused by the external pressure applied to the areas of his neck and face. The facts were presented by the Expert Panel which also included Judicial Medical Officers in front of Colombo Magistrate Rajindra Jayasuriya and the report was submitted after an independent series of investigations. However, the relatives of Schaffter requested the court to allow the attorneys to present facts regarding the post mortem examination report which the Magistrate refused to accept by highlighting the fact that there is no provision available in the law that allows an external party to present facts regarding such judiciary cases. During the court proceedings, his body was placed at the Karapitiya Teaching Hospital. The judge gave instructions to provide necessary facilities for the burial of the remains at the Jawatte Cemetery. The court further instructed the Criminal Investigation Department to take immediate action to arrest those who were involved around the murder of Schaffter.

== See also ==
- List of cricketers who were murdered
