= Mark Parker (cricketer) =

New Zealand cricketer (1975–2002)

Personal information
- Full name: Mark Morton Parker
- Born: 2 October 1975; Timaru, South Canterbury, New Zealand
- Died: 12 October 2002 (aged 27); Bali, Indonesia
- Batting: Right-handed
- Relatives: Murray Parker (father); John Parker (uncle); Ken Parker (uncle)

Domestic team information
- Years: Team
- 1996/97: Otago

Career statistics
Competition	First-class
Matches	3
Runs scored	50
Batting average	8.33
100s/50s	0/0
Top score	14
Catches/stumpings	5/0
- Source: Cricinfo

Mark Morton Parker (Note: Some sources spell Parker's middle name "Moreton".) (2 October 1975 – 12 October 2002) was a New Zealand cricketer. He played three matches first-class matches for Otago during the 1996–97 season.

Parker was born at Timaru in South Canterbury in 1975, the son of New Zealand international cricketer Murray Parker. His uncle John Parker also played international cricket for New Zealand while another uncle, Ken Parker, played first-class cricket for Auckland. Parker was educated at Timaru Boys' High School before going on to the University of Otago, where he graduated with a Bachelor of Commerce degree in 1998, with a double major in marketing and management. After graduating he spent two years working and playing cricket in England before later working as a sales representative for a Wellington based company for two years and then returning to work in the banking industry in London for three more years.

After having played age-group and Second XI cricket for Canterbury and Hawke Cup cricket for South Canterbury in 1993–94, Parker made his played age-group matches for Otago whilst at university in the following two seasons. He made his senior representative debut for Otago in February 1997, making scores of 11 and 14 against Northern Districts on debut. A batsman who was considered "a great timer of the ball" He went on to play two more first-class matches during the season, scoring a total of 50 first-class runs.

Parker had spent the 2002 English season playing club cricket in Hampshire. He was visiting Bali on holiday on the way back to New Zealand when he died as a result of wounds he received in the 2002 Bali bombings. He was aged 27.
