= Arun Lal =

Indian cricketer (born 1955)

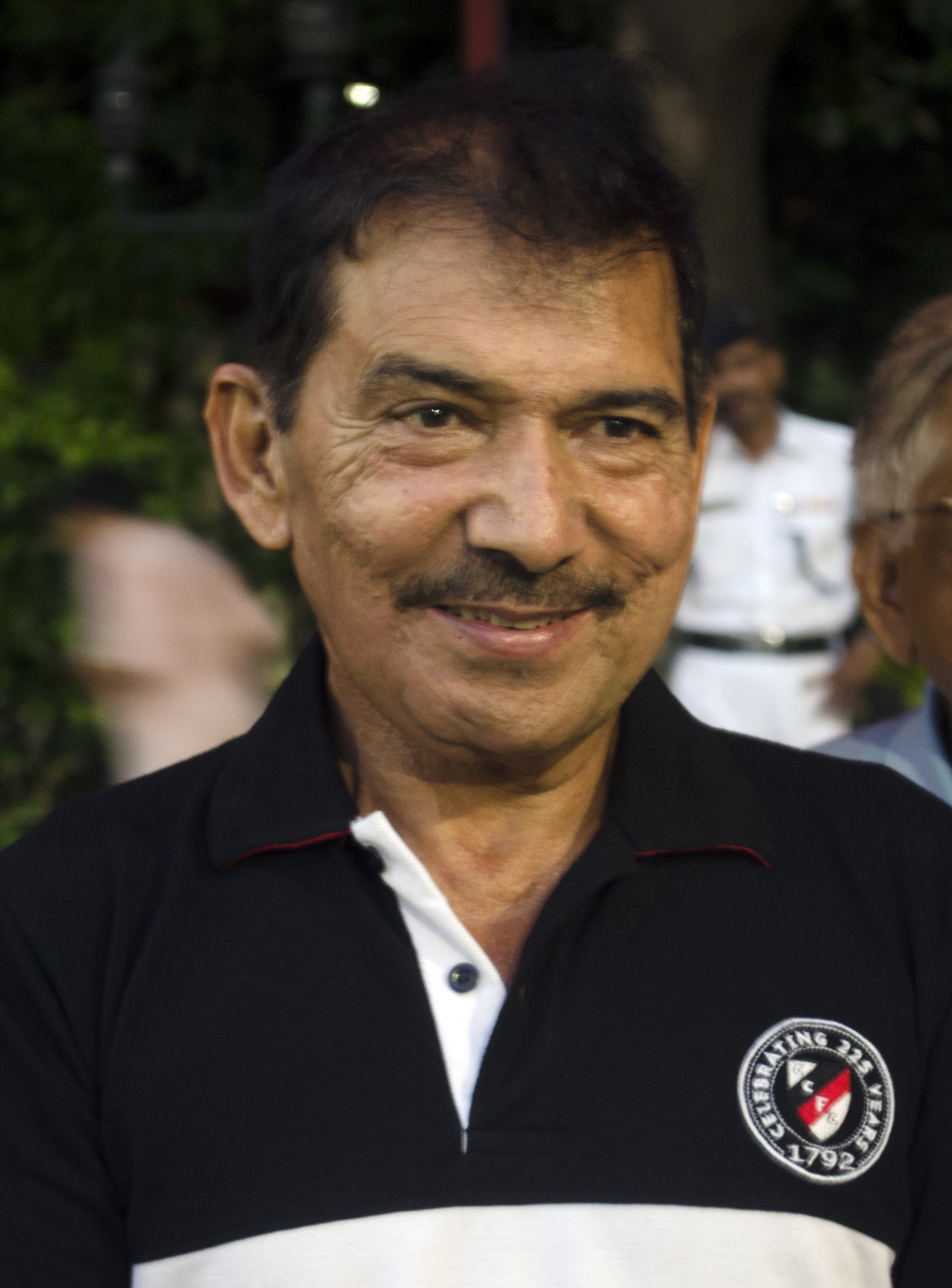

Personal information
- Full name: Jagdishlal Arun Lal
- Born: 1 August 1955 (age 71); Moradabad, Uttar Pradesh, India
- Batting: Right-handed
- Bowling: Right-arm medium
- Role: Batsman
- Relatives: Bulbul Saha (Wife) (2 May 2022); Jagdish Lal (father); Muni Lal (uncle); Akash Lal (cousin)

International information
- National side: India
- Test debut (cap 159): 17 September 1982 v Sri Lanka
- Last Test: 29 April 1989 v West Indies
- ODI debut (cap 39): 27 January 1982 v England
- Last ODI: 21 March 1989 v West Indies

Domestic team information
- Years: Team
- 1977/78–1980/81: Delhi
- 1981/82–1995/96: Bengal

Career statistics
Competition	Test	ODI	FC	LA
Matches	16	13	156	65
Runs scored	729	122	10,421	1,734
Batting average	26.03	9.38	46.94	28.90
100s/50s	0/6	0/1	30/43	0/12
Top score	93	51	287	90
Balls bowled	16	–	1,856	699
Wickets	0	–	21	14
Bowling average	–	–	44.33	40.78
5 wickets in innings	–	–	0	0
10 wickets in match	–	–	0	0
Best bowling	–	–	4/79	3/38
Catches/stumpings	13/–	4/–	145/–	22/–
- Source: ESPNcricinfo, 16 May 2016

Jagdishlal Arun Lal (born 1 August 1955) is a retired Indian cricketer, and a cricket commentator. He played for India, as a right-handed batsman, between 1982 and 1989 was a gritty player.

His columns about cricket analysis regularly appear in newspaper and internet columns. He moved from Delhi to Calcutta in 1979 and started a cricket academy. He joined the Bengal cricket team in 1981 and presently serves as their head coach.

== Early life and education ==
Arun Lal did his schooling at Mayo College, Ajmer and received his undergraduate degree from St. Stephen's College, Delhi.

== Career ==
In 1982, he made his Test debut against Sri Lanka at Madras with 63 and shared a partnership of 156 with Sunil Gavaskar. In his next test, he scored 51 against Pakistan and shared an opening partnership with Sunil Gavaskar for 105. His highest test innings score is 93 made against West Indies at Calcutta in 1987.

His ODI average stands at 9.36. At Indian domestic level he represented Bengal cricket team and Delhi cricket team where he has a record of scoring over 10,000 runs with a top score of 287 and a batting average of 46.94. He resigned from domestic cricket in March 2001. His last club match was for East Bengal.

He represented Bengal in the iconic Doordarshan national integration song, "Mile Sur Mera Tumara". In that he comes out of the Kolkata metro rail. He usually commentates on matches India play at home, which are broadcast by Star Sports.

In 2016, he was detected having jaw cancer which has kept him out of commentary box since January 2016.

Arun Lal conferred with the Lifetime Achievement award by the Cricket Association of Bengal's (CAB's) on 3 August 2019. He was served as president of the Calcutta Cricket and Football Club.

== Personal life ==
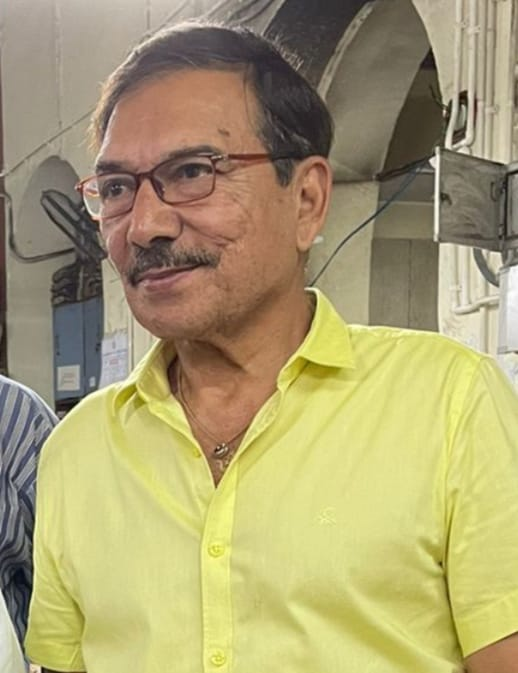
Arun Lal in 2023

Arun Lal got married for the second time as the 66-year old tied the knot with his girlfriend Bulbul Saha on 2 May 2022, in Kolkata. Saha is 28 years younger than Lal.
