= Mahinda Jayaratne =

Sri Lankan cricketer (1969–1997)

Personal information
- Full name: Mahinda Parakrama Jayaratne
- Born: 11 May 1967
- Died: 15 March 1997 (aged 29)
- Batting: Right-handed
- Bowling: Right-arm medium
- Source: Cricinfo, 19 April 2021

Mahinda Parakrama Jayaratne (11 May 1967 – 15 March 1997) was a Sri Lankan cricketer. He played in six first-class matches between 1989/90 and 1992/93. He was injured after being shot by a gunman on a motorcycle at his home while he was running the campaign of a candidate in a local election. He died two days later.

== See also ==
- List of cricketers who were murdered
