= John Commins (cricketer, born 1941) =

South African cricketer (1941–2013)

Personal information
- Full name: John Eugene Commins
- Born: 6 November 1941; Cape Town, South Africa
- Died: 1 January 2013 (aged 71); Cape Town, South Africa
- Batting: Right-handed
- Bowling: Right-arm leg-spin
- Relatives: John Commins (nephew)

Domestic team information
- Years: Team
- 1960–61 to 1968–69: Western Province

Career statistics
Competition	First-class
Matches	10
Runs scored	110
Batting average	7.85
100s/50s	0/0
Top score	29 not out
Balls bowled	1434
Wickets	27
Bowling average	27.77
5 wickets in innings	1
10 wickets in match	0
Best bowling	5/32
Catches/stumpings	0/–
- Source: ESPNcricinfo, 5 December 2017

John Eugene Commins (6 November 1941 – 2 January 2013) was a South African cricketer. He played ten first-class matches for Western Province between 1960 and 1969.

Commins, a leg-spin bowler, had a good debut season for Western Province in 1960–61 when, aged 19, he took 22 wickets at an average of 18.50, including his best figures of 5 for 32 against Eastern Province. However, he played only four more first-class matches over the next eight seasons.

In January 2013, Commins was murdered in Cape Town, aged 71. He was the uncle of John Commins who played in the Proteas team in 1994 and 1995.

== See also ==
- List of cricketers who were murdered
