= Rahatullah =

Pakistani cricketer (1989–2008)

Cricket information
- Batting: Right-handed
- Bowling: Right-arm fast-medium

Career statistics
Competition	First-class
Matches	3
Runs scored	5
Batting average	1.25
100s/50s	0/0
Top score	5
Balls bowled	555
Wickets	16
Bowling average	19.00
5 wickets in innings	0
10 wickets in match	0
Best bowling	4/57
Catches/stumpings	0/0
- Source: CricketArchive

Rahatullah (23 June 1989 – 11 February 2008) (راحة الله) was a Pakistani first-class cricketer.

A right-arm seam bowler, Rahatullah played three matches for his home city of Peshawar in the 2007–08 Quaid-i-Azam Trophy. He had previously represented the Pakistan Under-19 cricket team with whom he toured both Australia and India.

On 11 February 2008 he was on his way to Arbab Niaz Stadium where he was due to join the North West Frontier Province squad when he was shot dead by unknown assailants.

== See also ==
- List of cricketers who were murdered

== Sources ==
- Rahatullah at Cricinfo
- Article on his shooting
