= Eric Gillott =

New Zealand cricketer

Personal information
- Full name: Eric Kenneth Gillott
- Born: 15 April 1951 (age 75); Waiuku, Auckland, New Zealand
- Batting: Right-handed
- Bowling: Slow left-arm orthodox
- Role: Bowler

Domestic team information
- Years: Team
- 1971/72–1978/79: Northern Districts
- FC debut: 30 December 1971 Northern Districts v Central Districts
- Last FC: 22 January 1979 Northern Districts v Otago
- LA debut: 5 December 1971 Northern Districts v Auckland
- Last LA: 2 December 1973 Northern Districts v Auckland

Career statistics
Competition	First-class	List A
Matches	31	3
Runs scored	172	17
Batting average	8.60	5.66
100s/50s	0/0	0/0
Top score	22	11
Balls bowled	5,610	169
Wickets	81	4
Bowling average	30.77	31.00
5 wickets in innings	2	0
10 wickets in match	0	0
Best bowling	6/79	2/49
Catches/stumpings	9/–	0/–
- Source: CricketArchive, 16 May 2011

Eric Kenneth Gillott (born 15 April 1951) is a former New Zealand cricketer. He played first-class and List A cricket for Northern Districts between 1971/72 and 1978/79. He also toured England in 1973 as part of the New Zealand team that played three Tests, though he did not feature in the Tests.

== Life and career ==
Gillott was born at Waiuku, Auckland. He was a slow left-arm orthodox spin bowler and a right-handed tail-end batsman. He made his first-class and List A debuts for Northern Districts in the 1971/72 season and in his second match he took six Otago wickets for 79 runs in 43 overs in the match at Dunedin. The 29 wickets he took in six matches in that New Zealand cricket season were beaten only by the 31 taken by another slow left-arm bowler, the Test player Hedley Howarth. He followed this with 23 wickets in the 1972/73 season, with a further six-wicket haul, six for 105, in the match against Wellington at the Basin Reserve.

This led to his call-up for the 1973 New Zealand tour of England, but he was not a success and took only 10 first-class wickets on the tour. Wisden Cricketers' Almanack's report of the tour said of him: "Gillott showed he had yet to develop all the skills of a top-class left-hander." It noted also that there were few pitches suited to spin bowling, which also had not helped the senior left-arm spinner, Howarth, who had been successful on the 1969 tour. Gillott was no more successful on his return to New Zealand for the 1973/74 season, and he dropped out of the Northern Districts side at the end of the season.

In 1976, Gillott spent a cricket season in England playing non-first-class Minor Counties cricket for Buckinghamshire, taking 41 wickets in the season, the most by any player in the team. He returned to New Zealand for a further single season of first-class cricket for Northern Districts in 1978/79, but with little success, and left top-class cricket entirely after that.
