= Janashakthi Insurance =

Insurance company in Sri Lanka

Janashakthi Insurance PLC
- Logo of Janashakthi Insurance
- Company type: Public
- Traded as: CSE: JINS.N0000
- ISIN: LK0356N00002
- Industry: Insurance
- Founded: August 28, 1992; 33 years ago
- Founder: Chandra Schaffter
- Headquarters: Colombo, Sri Lanka
- Number of locations: 75 (2023)
- Key people: Prakash Schaffter (Deputy Chairman); Ravi Liyanage (CEO); Mahela Jayawardene (Director)
- Revenue: ▲LKR13,661 million (2023)
- Operating income: ▲LKR5,251 million (2023)
- Net income: ▲LKR4,135 million (2023)
- Total assets: ▲LKR36,192 million (2023)
- Total equity: ▲LKR15,592 million (2023)
- Number of employees: ▼357 (2023)
- Parent: Janashakthi Limited (74.23%)
- Website: www.janashakthi.com

Janashakthi Insurance PLC is an insurance company in Sri Lanka. The company was incorporated in 1992 and its operations were commenced in 1994. Janashakthi Insurance became the first company to specialise in life insurance in Sri Lanka. Janashakthi Insurance became a public company when the company was listed on the Colombo Stock Exchange in 2008. The company was a constituent of the S&P Sri Lanka 20 Index in 2016. Janashakthi Insurance is ranked 85th in LMD 100, an annual list of listed companies by revenue in Sri Lanka. Janashakthi Insurance is known for its long-term patronage of sports, especially cricket.

== History ==
The company was incorporated in 1992 as Janashakthi Life Insurance Company Limited. In 1994, Janashakthi Insurance commenced operations as Sri Lanka's first specialised life insurance company. Janashakthi General Insurance Co Limited was launched in the following year. The two companies merged to form Janashakthi Insurance Co Ltd in 2000. In 2002, the company expanded to the Maldives, thus becoming the first Sri Lankan insurer to operate overseas. Janashakthi Insurance became a public company with its listing on the Colombo Stock Exchange in 2008. The conflicting statutory provisions have caused a dispute between National Development Bank (NDB) and Janashakthi Insurance over an ownership concentration. NDB sought an interim injunction against Janashakthi Insurance to prevent interference by Janashakthi Insurance. The District Judge of Colombo dismissed the interim injunction and held that Janashakthi Insurance is not in violation of the Banking Act. However, the dispute was resolved after the Insurance Board of Sri Lanka (IBSL) pressured Janashakthi Insurance to decrease its excessive shareholding in NDB.

The IBSL briefly suspended the company over a solvency concern in May 2009. However, the IBSL's actions were criticised for their hastiness. The company acquired AIA General Insurance Lanka in 2015 for LKR3.2 billion. The acquisition increased the market share to 17.5% and making the company the third largest insurance company by revenue. However, the company divested its general insurance business to Allianz in 2018 for LKR16.7 billion. Janashakthi Insurance sold a leasehold land at 24, Staple Street in Colombo 2 to Sanken Construction for LKR1.93 billion. Janashakthi Insurance claimed a profit of LKR940 million out of the transaction. The 25th anniversary of operations of the company was celebrated in 2019.

== Operations ==
Janashakthi Insurance was included in S&P Sri Lanka 20 Index in 2019. ICRA Lanka revised its credit rating of Janashakthi Limited, the parent of Janashakthi Insurance to [SL]BB+ in 2022. The credit outlook was adjudged as negative. Janashakthi Limited holds 74% of the ownership of Janashakthi Insurance. Janashakthi Insurance is the seventh largest life insurance company in the country with 4% of the market share. Janashakthi Limited is also the holding company of Orient Finance PLC, First Capital PLC and Kelsey Developments PLC. Brand Finance named the company as the fastest growing brand in the insurance sector of Sri Lanka in 2022. Janakakthi Insurance was ranked 83rd most valuable brand in Sri Lanka with a brand value of LKR569 million.

The company appointed Ravi Liyanage to the chief executive officer's position in 2020. Previously, Liyanage had served on the board of directors of the company from 2006 to 2009. The company recorded a 45% growth in Gross Written Premium for the financial year 2021. For the same period, the total revenue was LKR7.2 billion, a 14% growth from the previous year. The company was recognised as a "Great Place to Work in Sri Lanka" in 2021 after an independent analysis.

=== Association with cricket ===
The company was founded by Chandra Schaffter, a former double international athlete who represented Ceylon in Cricket and Hockey and a cricket administrator. The company launched The Janashakthi Book of Sri Lanka Cricket, 1832-1996 in 1999, authored by S. S. Perera. The book is written pertaining to the 165-year history of Cricket in the country. Janashakthi Insurance became the sponsor of the Zimbabwe cricket team's 2001-02 Sri Lanka tour. The series was called the Janashakthi National Test series. Besides cricket, the company sponsored the 33rd National Squash Championship in 2013. It was the 11th consecutive year that Janashakthi Insurance sponsored the event. The company appointed Mahela Jayawardene, a former Sri Lanka cricket captain to its board of directors in 2021.

== Publications ==
- Perera, S. S. (1999). Muthiah, S. (ed.). The Janashakthi Book of Sri Lanka Cricket, 1832-1996. Janashakthi Insurance.

== See also ==
- List of companies listed on the Colombo Stock Exchange
