= Kenneth Parker (cricketer) =

New Zealand cricketer (born 1945)

Personal information
- Full name: Kenneth John Parker
- Born: 12 April 1945; Dannevirke, New Zealand
- Died: 10 June 2022 (aged 77); North Shore, Auckland, New Zealand
- Batting: Right-handed
- Relatives: Murray Parker (brother); John Parker (brother)

Domestic team information
- Years: Team
- 1970/71: Auckland
- Source: ESPNcricinfo, 19 June 2016

Kenneth John Parker (12 April 1945 – 10 June 2022) was a New Zealand cricketer. He played one first-class match for Auckland in 1970/71.

Parker died in June 2022, at the age of 77.

== See also ==
- List of Auckland representative cricketers
