= John Commins (cricketer, born 1965) =

South African cricketer (born 1965)

Cricket information
- Batting: Right-handed
- Bowling: Right-arm medium

International information
- National side: South Africa
- Test debut (cap 258): 26 December 1994 v New Zealand
- Last Test: 19 January 1995 v Pakistan

Career statistics
Competition	Test	First-class
Matches	3	94
Runs scored	125	5,835
Batting average	25.00	40.80
100s/50s	0/0	13/34
Top score	45	200*
Balls bowled	–	323
Wickets	–	4
Bowling average	–	42.50
5 wickets in innings	–	0
10 wickets in match	–	0
Best bowling	–	2/28
Catches/stumpings	2/–	32/–
- Source: Cricinfo

John Brian Commins (born 19 February 1965) is a former South African national cricket team member who played in three Test matches during the 1994/95 season. He was the nephew of the late John Commins who played in the Western Province cricket team between 1960 and 1969.
