= Dhammika Niroshana =

Sri Lankan cricketer (1983–2024)

Personal information
- Full name: Hinidumage Dhammika Niroshana
- Born: 22 February 1983; Galle, Sri Lanka
- Died: 16 July 2024 (aged 41); Ambalangoda, Sri Lanka
- Batting: Right-handed
- Bowling: Right-arm fast-medium

Domestic team information
- Years: Team
- 2000: Sri Lanka U-19s
- 2001–2002: Singha Sports Club
- 2003: Chilaw Marians Cricket Club
- 2003–2004: Galle Cricket Club

Career statistics
Competition	First-class	List A
Matches	12	8
Runs scored	269	48
Batting average	14.94	16.00
100s/50s	0/0	0/0
Top score	47*	27
Balls bowled	874	204
Wickets	19	5
Bowling average	26.84	29.40
5 wickets in innings	0	0
10 wickets in match	0	0
Best bowling	4/33	2/18
Catches/stumpings	4/–	0/–
- Source: Cricinfo

Hinidumage Dhammika Niroshana (22 February 1983 – 16 July 2024) was a Sri Lankan cricketer. He made his debut for the Sri Lanka Under 19s against Singapore in 2000. He continued playing Under 19 Test and ODI cricket for two years (captaining the side on ten occasions, but winning only one match) before making his senior First-class debut; for the Sri Lanka Schools XI. He went on to appear in domestic Sri Lankan cricket for Chilaw Marians Cricket Club and Galle Cricket Club. He was an old boy of Sri Devananda College, Ambalangoda.

Niroshana played as a bowler, with a healthy bowling average of under 30 in First-class, List A and both Under 19 forms of the game.

Niroshana was murdered on 16 July 2024, when he was shot dead in front of his home in Kandewatte, Ambalangoda. He was 41.

== See also ==
- List of cricketers who were murdered
