= Murray Parker (cricketer) =

New Zealand cricketer (born 1948)

Personal information
- Full name: Norman Murray Parker
- Born: 28 August 1948 (age 78); Dannevirke, Hawke's Bay, New Zealand
- Batting: Right-handed
- Relatives: John Parker (brother); Ken Parker (brother); Mark Parker (son)

International information
- National side: New Zealand
- Test debut (cap 137): 30 October 1976 v Pakistan
- Last Test: 18 November 1976 v India
- Only ODI (cap 24): 16 October 1976 v Pakistan

Domestic team information
- Years: Team
- 1967/68–1969/70: Otago
- 1973/74–1978/79: Canterbury

Career statistics
Competition	Test	ODI	FC	LA
Matches	3	1	52	10
Runs scored	89	0	2,102	94
Batting average	14.83	0.00	25.02	11.75
100s/50s	0/0	0/0	1/8	0/0
Top score	40	0	135	33
Catches/stumpings	2/–	1/–	45/–	3/–
- Source: Cricinfo, 11 April 2017

Norman Murray Parker (born 28 August 1948) is a former New Zealand cricketer who played in three Test matches and one One Day International during 1976.

Parker was born in Dannevirke and grew up in Warkworth in the Northland Region, where he attended Mahurangi College. Later he studied at the University of Otago before going to a teachers' college in Christchurch. His first post as a teacher was at Timaru Boys' High School, where he taught science and physical education from 1971 to 2013. His wife Verna, whom he married in 1970, taught at Timaru Girls' High School.

His highest first-class cricket score was 135 in his first game for Canterbury in 1973–74, in a team total of 225. He also played for South Canterbury in the Hawke Cup.

His brother John also played Test cricket for New Zealand and was in the team with Murray for his four international matches. His son Mark was also a promising cricketer, but his professional career was cut short when he was killed in the 2002 Bali bombings.
