= Farrukh Zaman =

Pakistani cricketer (born 1956)

Personal information
- Born: 2 April 1956 (age 70); Peshawar, Pakistan
- Batting: Right-handed
- Bowling: Slow left-arm orthodox

International information
- National side: Pakistan
- Only Test (cap 72): 23 October 1976 v New Zealand

Career statistics
Competition	Test	First-class
Matches	1	137
Runs scored	–	1,420
Batting average	–	10.51
100s/50s	–	0/3
Top score	–	54
Balls bowled	80	24,382
Wickets	0	403
Bowling average	–	27.85
5 wickets in innings	–	14
10 wickets in match	–	1
Best bowling	–	7/42
Catches/stumpings	0/–	57/–
- Source: ESPNcricinfo, 15 June 2017

Farrukh Zaman (born 2 April 1956) is a Pakistani former cricketer who played in one Test match in 1976. A slow left-arm orthodox bowler, he played first-class cricket in Pakistan from 1971–72 to 1995–96.

In 1976–77, Zaman claimed seven wickets for the NWFP Chief Minister's XI against the touring New Zealanders. He was selected for the second Test in the series, but was given only 10 overs in the match: six overs in the first innings (0 for 8) and four in the second (0 for 7).
