= John Parker (New Zealand cricketer) =

New Zealand cricketer (born 1951)

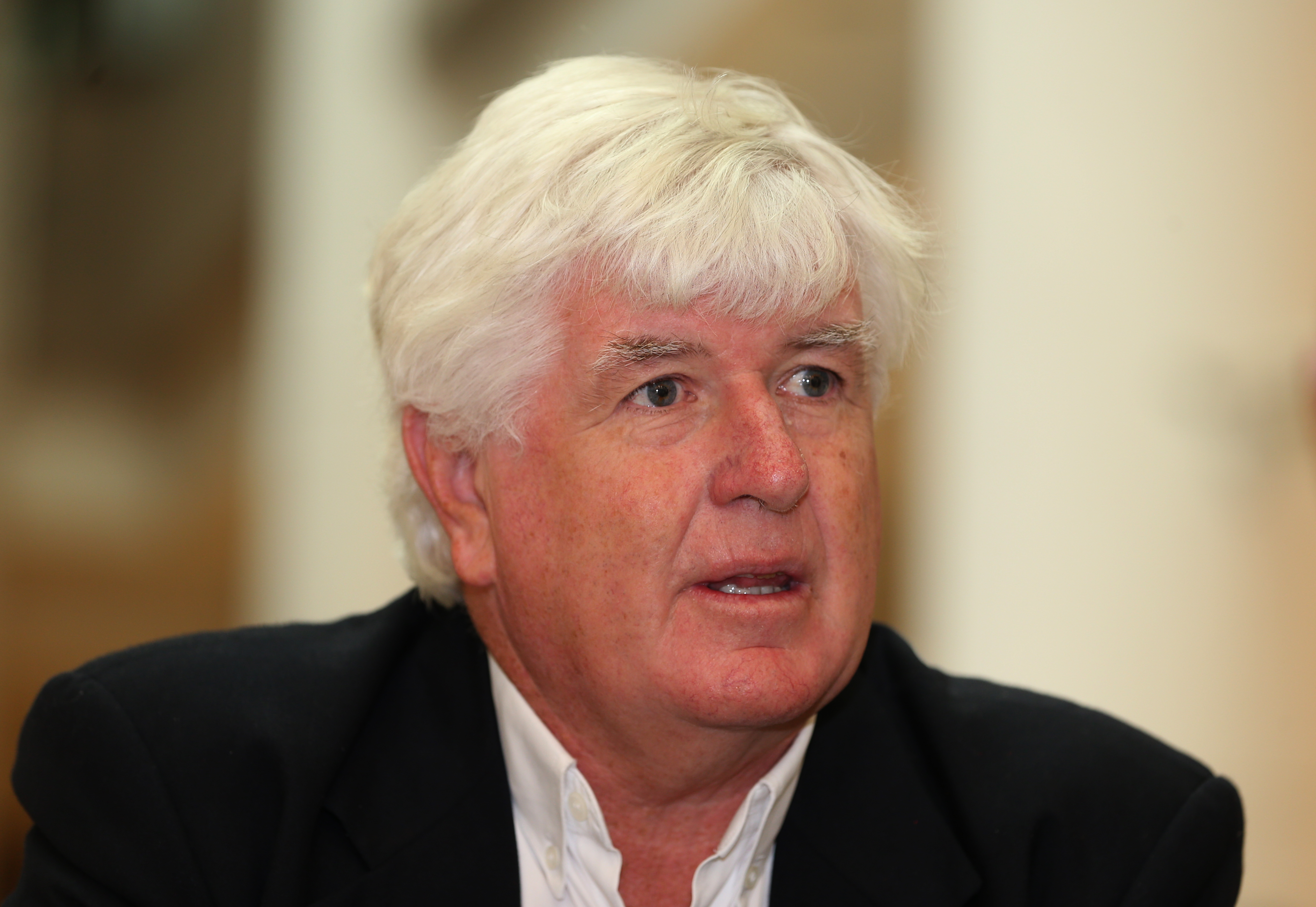
- Parker in 2013

Personal information
- Born: 21 February 1951 (age 75); Dannevirke, Hawke's Bay, New Zealand
- Batting: Right-handed
- Bowling: Legbreak googly
- Relatives: Murray Parker (brother); Ken Parker (brother); Mark Parker (nephew)

International information
- National side: New Zealand (1973–1981)
- Test debut (cap 124): 2 February 1973 v Pakistan
- Last Test: 26 December 1980 v Australia
- ODI debut (cap 17): 31 March 1974 v Australia
- Last ODI: 3 February 1981 v Australia

Domestic team information
- Years: Team
- 1971–1975: Worcestershire
- 1972/73–1983/84: Northern Districts

Career statistics
Competition	Test	ODI	FC	LA
Matches	36	24	207	113
Runs scored	1,498	248	11,254	2,121
Batting average	24.55	12.40	34.84	21.64
100s/50s	3/5	0/1	21/53	1/9
Top score	121	66	195	107
Balls bowled	40	16	903	20
Wickets	1	1	14	1
Bowling average	24.00	10.00	48.64	12.00
5 wickets in innings	0	0	0	0
10 wickets in match	0	0	0	0
Best bowling	1/24	1/10	3/26	1/10
Catches/stumpings	30/–	11/1	177/5	45/2
- Source: Cricinfo, 10 April 2017

John Morton Parker (born 21 February 1951) is a former New Zealand international cricketer who played first-class cricket between 1971 and 1984. He captained New Zealand in the third Test against Pakistan in 1976–77.

Parker played cricket in England when young, and helped Imran Khan at this time. He was the youngest of three brothers to play first-class cricket, the other two being Kenneth and Murray Parker.

He played 36 Test matches and 24 One Day International for New Zealand. Parker scored three Test hundreds and 21 first-class hundreds in a career that spanned 14 years.
