= Amanullah Khan (umpire) =

Pakistani cricket umpire (1933–2005)

Personal information
- Born: 10 October 1933; Kasur, Punjab, Pakistan
- Died: 12 March 2005 (aged 71)

Umpiring information
- Tests umpired: 13 (1975–1987)
- ODIs umpired: 13 (1980–1993)
- Source: Cricinfo, 1 July 2013

Amanullah Khan (10 October 1933 – 12 March 2005) was a Pakistani cricket umpire. Besides officiating in first-class fixtures at the domestic level, he stood in 13 Test matches between 1975 and 1987 as well as 13 One Day Internationals between 1980 and 1993.

== See also ==
- List of Test cricket umpires
- List of One Day International cricket umpires
