= Chandra Schaffter =

Sri Lankan cricketer and businessman

Personal information
- Full name: Chandra Thomas Adolphus Schaffter
- Born: 3 April 1930 (age 96); Colombo, Ceylon
- Bowling: Right-arm fast-medium

Career statistics
Competition	First-class
Matches	3
Runs scored	27
Batting average	6.75
100s/50s	0/0
Top score	17
Balls bowled	414
Wickets	10
Bowling average	19.30
5 wickets in innings	0
10 wickets in match	0
Best bowling	3/28
Catches/stumpings	1/0
- Source: Cricket Archive, 16 November 2015

Chandra Thomas Adolphus Schaffter (born 3 April 1930) is a Sri Lankan businessman and former cricket administrator. He played first-class cricket for Ceylon in the 1950s, and founded Sri Lanka's first major Sri Lankan-owned life insurance company, Janashakthi, in 1994. In September 2018, he was one of 49 former Sri Lankan cricketers felicitated by Sri Lanka Cricket, to honour them for their services before Sri Lanka became a full member of the International Cricket Council (ICC).

== Early life and sporting career ==
Chandra Schaffter was born in 1930 to Adolphus Jeshuran Schaffter, a school master, and his wife Alice Schaffter. His mother died when he was two, and his father when Chandra was 11. Schaffter boarded at S. Thomas' College, Mount Lavinia, representing the school First XI for several years as an opening bowler.

He played three first-class and two one-day matches for Ceylon between 1953 and 1958. His best performance came in the Gopalan Trophy match against Madras in Madras in 1953–54, when he opened the bowling and took 3 for 28 and 3 for 71 and the Ceylon team won by an innings and 108 runs.

He also represented Sri Lanka at hockey.

== Cricket administration and sponsorship ==
Schaffter managed the Sri Lankan cricket teams that toured England in 1991 and 2002. His company Janashakthi sponsored Test cricket in Sri Lanka, employed a number of prominent cricketers, and financed and published the first history of Sri Lankan cricket, The Janashakthi Book of Sri Lanka Cricket, 1832–1996 by S. S. Perera.

== Business career ==
Schaffter began work in the insurance business in 1952 as a clerk with the Ceylon Insurance Company. He later joined Manufacturers Life Insurance Co. Ltd, and then Carson Cumberbatch, where he became manager of the insurance department. In 1973 he and his wife Lilani moved to Madras, where their three sons and a daughter completed their schooling, and he worked as an insurance consultant.

He returned to Sri Lanka in the 1980s and continued to work in insurance. He was instrumental in persuading the national government to allow private insurance companies to operate again.

In 1994 Schaffter singlehandedly set up the Janashakthi insurance company. In 2001 and 2002 Janashakthi bought out the National Insurance Corporation. He worked to improve road safety in Colombo, and after the 2004 tsunami he championed the highest payout of any insurer in Sri Lanka, beyond the payment of sums assured, considerably in excess of the company's liabilities. Janashakthi handled many things other companies would not cover at the time, such as insurance against terrorism and insurance against AIDS.

== Family ==
Schaffter's sons Prakash and Dinesh also played first-class cricket. Prakash followed his father into the insurance industry, becoming chairman of Janashakthi, and also served Sri Lanka Cricket as an administrator.
