= Peter Petherick =

New Zealand cricketer

Personal information
- Full name: Peter James Petherick
- Born: 25 September 1942; Ranfurly, New Zealand
- Died: 7 June 2015 (aged 72); Perth, Western Australia
- Batting: Right-handed
- Bowling: Right-arm offbreak

International information
- National side: New Zealand (1976–1977)
- Test debut (cap 136): 9 October 1976 v Pakistan
- Last Test: 25 February 1977 v Australia

Domestic team information
- Years: Team
- 1975/76–1977/78: Otago
- 1978/79–1980/81: Wellington

Career statistics
Competition	Test	FC	LA
Matches	6	52	2
Runs scored	34	200	2
Batting average	4.85	5.88	2.00
100s/50s	0/0	0/0	0/0
Top score	13	19*	2
Balls bowled	1,305	4,625	74
Wickets	16	189	1
Bowling average	42.56	24.44	53.00
5 wickets in innings	0	9	0
10 wickets in match	0	2	0
Best bowling	3/90	9/93	1/39
Catches/stumpings	4/–	27/–	1/–
- Source: Cricinfo, 1 April 2017

Peter James Petherick (25 September 1942 – 7 June 2015) was a New Zealand cricketer who represented New Zealand in six Test cricket matches between October 1976 and March 1977 as an off-spinner. He is one of two New Zealand bowlers to achieve a hat-trick in Test matches. He is one of only three players, along with Maurice Allom and Damien Fleming, to have taken a hat-trick on Test debut.

== Domestic career ==
Making his first-class debut at 33, he played for Otago from 1975–76 to 1977–78, and for Wellington from 1978–79 to 1980–81. In his fifth match he took 9 for 93 in the first innings against Northern Districts, and he finished the 1975–76 season with 42 wickets at 20.13.

== After cricket ==
After his retirement from cricket, Petherick took up lawn bowls, and skippered a two-man team to the final of the New Zealand national bowls championship in 2006. He died in Perth, Australia, on 7 June 2015.

== See also ==
- List of Test cricket hat-tricks
