= Prakash Schaffter =

Sri Lankan cricketer, cricket administrator, and businessman

Personal information
- Full name: Prakash Anand Schaffter
- Born: 19 June 1967 (age 59); Colombo, Western Province, Ceylon
- Batting: Right-handed
- Bowling: Right-arm fast-medium
- Relatives: Chandra Schaffter (father); Dinesh Schaffter (brother)

Domestic team information
- Years: Team
- 1997–1998: Cambridge University

Career statistics
Competition	First-class
Matches	5
Runs scored	20
Batting average	6.66
100s/50s	0/0
Top score	12
Balls bowled	435
Wickets	3
Bowling average	65.00
5 wickets in innings	0
10 wickets in match	0
Best bowling	1/21
Catches/stumpings	0/–
- Source: Cricinfo, 25 January 2022

Prakash Anand Schaffter (born June 19, 1967) is a Sri Lankan corporate executive, former first-class cricketer, and cricket administrator. He is the son of the renowned Sri Lankan entrepreneur and double international, Chandra Schaffter. Prakash is one of four siblings, having two brothers and a sister. Born in Sri Lanka and raised in Madras (Chennai), he has pursued his undergraduate studies at the University of London before attaining an MBA from the University of Cambridge.

Currently, he serves as the Executive Deputy Chairman of Janashakthi Insurance PLC, and of the Janashakthi Group (JXG) in Sri Lanka. His role includes overseeing the Group's operations in various sectors such as investment banking, insurance, and finance. Prakash is one of the youngest-ever Fellow Members of the Chartered Insurance Institute. He has previously held the position of President of the Young Presidents' Organization of Sri Lanka and was a member of the council of the Sri Lanka Institute of Directors (SLID). Additionally, he currently holds the position of Vice President of The Colombo Club, Sri Lanka's second-oldest gentlemen's club, and sits on the boards of numerous other listed and unlisted entities.

Married with three children, Prakash currently resides in Colombo, Sri Lanka.

== Childhood ==
Born on June 19, 1967, in Colombo, Sri Lanka, to Chandra and Lilani Schaffter, Prakash spent his early childhood in Sri Lanka (then known as Ceylon). In 1973, at the age of six and half, his family moved to Chennai, which became their home for the next decade. His mother cared for him and his siblings, while his father, Chandra Schaffter, travelled frequently between Chennai and Colombo. Despite the move, the family maintained their Sri Lankan roots by regularly returning for summer holidays.

Prakash's early education began in Chennai, where he studied from grade 3 to grade 9, including time at Madras Christian College High School. In 1981, Prakash returned to Sri Lanka, where he completed his Ordinary Level and Advanced Level examinations privately. At the age of 15, he began working at his father’s company, Protection and Indemnity Co. Ltd, a principal agency of the National Insurance Corporation, and took on the responsibilities of both work and studies.

== Higher Education ==
The tumultuous events of the 1983 riots led Prakash back to Chennai, and he ventured to the United Kingdom in December 1986. In the UK, he pursued the Chartered Insurance exams, achieving Associate-ship and Fellowship qualifications. Prakash is one of the youngest-ever Fellow Members of the Chartered Insurance Institute, qualifying at the age of 22.

In 1989, Prakash began his degree in politics at the School of Oriental and African Studies in the UK, successfully graduating in 1992. In 1995, he pursued an MBA at the Judge Business School of University of Cambridge, UK.

== Career in the Insurance Sector ==
Upon returning to Sri Lanka with his siblings in the latter part of 1992, he was appointed as the Director at P&I Insurance Brokers and played a key role in expanding the family's brokering business.

Subsequently, in the early 90’s, he actively participated in the initial planning phase for the establishment of Janashakthi Life Insurance, the first specialized life insurance company in Sri Lanka. In 1995, while he was pursuing higher studies, concurrently playing a pivotal role in the formation of Janashakthi General Insurance. He assumed the position of Deputy General Manager in Administration and promoted to General Manager in 1998. Prakash also played a crucial role in the acquisition of the National Insurance Corporation in Sri Lanka in early 2001.

In 2006, Prakash assumed the role of Managing Director at Janashakthi Insurance and played a key role in the acquisition of the non-life segment of AIA Insurance Sri Lanka in 2015. This strategic move propelled Janashakthi Insurance to become the third-largest insurer in Sri Lanka at that time. In 2018, Prakash Schaffter spearheaded the divestment project of Janashakthi's non-life segment, and in the same year, took on the position of Chairman of Janashakthi Insurance PLC. As a former President of the Insurance Association of Sri Lanka, Prakash led discussions on regulatory changes, including the separation of Life and non-life business segments. Currently, he serves as the Executive Deputy Chairman of Janashakthi Insurance PLC, and Executive Deputy Chairman of the Janashakthi Group (JXG) in Sri Lanka.

== Cricket ==
During his tenure at the University of Cambridge, he extended his MBA course by a year to participate in cricket for the Cambridge team. Prior to his Cambridge years, he played competitive cricket for the Finchley Cricket Club of the Middlesex County League, a prominent team during the late 80s and 90s. Prakash played cricket for the Cambridge University Cricket Club from 1997 to 1998, establishing himself as a right-arm fast-medium bowler and a lower-order batsman. He represented both Cambridge University and London University during his cricketing tenure.

Prakash was also invited into cricket administration in Sri Lanka, serving on three interim committees (2005-2007, 2011, and 2015) tasked with overseeing Sri Lanka cricket. He served as the Secretary of Sri Lanka Cricket in two of these committees. Additionally, Prakash held significant positions as the President and Honorary General Secretary of the Tamil Union Cricket and Athletic Club.

== Awards and Accolades ==
In 2019, Prakash was honoured as one of the A-list 100 Sri Lankan business people who contributed significantly to the nation's growth, as recognized by LMD, The Voice of Business.
