= Jagdish Lal =

Indian cricketer (1920–1997)

Personal information
- Full name: Dhir Jagdish Lal
- Born: 8 October 1920; Kapurthala, Punjab, British India
- Died: 3 March 1997 (aged 76); Kapurthala, Punjab, India
- Source: ESPNcricinfo, 19 April 2016

Jagdish Lal (8 October 1920 – 3 March 1997) was an Indian cricketer. He played sixteen first-class matches for eight different teams between 1938 and 1959.

== See also ==
- List of Hyderabad cricketers
