= List of cricketers who were killed during military service =

This is a list of cricketers who were killed during military service. The cricketers are listed by war and divided into those who appeared in Test cricket and those who only played first-class cricket.

The conflicts featured on this list are, in chronological order, the Napoleonic Wars, Crimean War, First Boer War, Mahdist War, Second Boer War, World War I, Easter Rising, Irish War of Independence, World War II and the South African Border War. Approximately 210 first-class cricketers are known to have served in the First World War.

== Napoleonic Wars (1803–1815) ==
=== First-class cricketers ===
Name	Main first-class team	Ref	Rank	Date of death	Age	Place of death	Ref
Richard Beckett	MCC		Captain	28 July 1809	37	Talavera de la Reina, Spain	

== Crimean War (1853–1856) ==
=== First-class cricketers ===
Name	Main first-class team	Ref	Rank	Date of death	Age	Place of death	Ref
Duncombe Buckley	Marylebone Cricket Club		Captain	6 September 1855	24	Sevastopol, Russian Empire	
Henry Neville	Marylebone Cricket Club		Captain	5 November 1854	30	Inkerman, Russian Empire	

== First Boer War (1880–1881) ==
=== First-class cricketers ===
Name	Main first-class team	Ref	Rank	Date of death	Age	Place of death	Ref
Edward Wilkinson	Cambridge University		Lieutenant	8 February 1881	27	Scheins Hoogte, Colony of Natal	

== Mahdist War (1881–1899) ==
=== First-class cricketers ===
Name	Main first-class team	Ref	Rank	Date of death	Age	Place of death	Ref
Herbert Stewart	MCC		Major-general	16 February 1885	41	Gakdul, Sudan	
John Trask	Somerset		Surgeon-captain	25 July 1896	34	Kosheh, Sudan	

== Second Boer War (1899–1902) ==
=== Test cricketers ===
Name	Test team	Ref	Date of death	Age	Place of death	Ref
John Ferris	Australia		17 November 1900	33	Addington, Durban, Colony of Natal	
Frank Milligan	England		31 March 1900	30	Ramatlabama, Bechuanaland Protectorate	

=== First-class cricketers ===
Name	Main first-class team	Ref	Date of death	Age	Place of death	Ref
Cecil Boyle	Oxford University		5 April 1900	47	near Boshof, Orange Free State	
Frank Crawford	Kent		16 January 1900	49	Pietermaritzburg, Colony of Natal	
Dudley Forbes	Oxford University		21 April 1901	28	Kroonstad, Orange Free State	
Charles Hulse	Marylebone Cricket Club		4 June 1901	40	Braklaagte, Orange Free State	
Douglas McLean	Somerset		5 February 1901	37	Johannesburg, Transvaal Republic	
Marshall Porter	Dublin University		5 June 1900	26	Ladywood, Lindley, Orange Free State	
Henry Stanley	Somerset		16 September 1900	27	Hekpoort, Transvaal Republic	
George Strachan	Surrey		29 December 1901	51	Middelburg, Transvaal Republic	
Frank Townsend	Gloucestershire		25 May 1901	25	Kimberley, Cape Colony	
Prince Christian Victor	I Zingari		29 October 1900	33	Pretoria, Transvaal Republic	

== World War I (1914–1918) ==
275 first-class cricketers were killed on active service during the First World War, including twelve Test cricketers.

=== Test cricketers ===
Name	Test team	Ref	Date of death	Age	Place of death	Ref
Colin Blythe	England		8 November 1917	38	near Passchendaele, Belgium	
Major Booth	England		1 July 1916	29	near La Signy Farm, France	
Frederick Cook	South Africa		30 November 1915	45	Cape Helles, Gallipoli Peninsula, Ottoman Empire	
Tibby Cotter	Australia		31 October 1917	33	near Beersheba, Palestine	
Reginald Hands	South Africa		20 April 1918	29	Boulogne, France	
Kenneth Hutchings	England		3 September 1916	33	Ginchy, France	
Bill Lundie	South Africa		12 September 1917	29	near Passchendaele, Belgium	
Leonard Moon	England		23 November 1916	38	near Karasouli, Salonica, Greece	
Claude Newberry	South Africa		1 August 1916	27	Delville Wood, Somme, France	
Arthur Edward Ochse	South Africa		11 April 1918	48	Middle Farm, Petit Puits, Messines Ridge, France	
Reggie Schwarz	South Africa		18 November 1918	43	Étaples, France	
Gordon White	South Africa		17 October 1918	36	Gaza, Palestine	

=== First-class cricketers ===
Name	Main first-class team	Ref	Date of death	Age	Place of death	Ref
Cecil Abercrombie	Hampshire		31 May 1916	30	at sea, naval action off Jutland (HMS Defence)	
Fred Abraham	British Guiana		2 October 1918	32	Joncourt, France	
Lestock Adams	Cambridge University		22 April 1918	30	Placaut Wood, France	
Charlie Adamson	Queensland		17 September 1918	43	Salonica, Greece	
Ernest Alderwick	Gloucestershire		26 August 1917	31	Peronne, France	
Henry Anderson	Europeans (India)		29 October 1914	47	near La Gorgue, France	
Alban Arnold	Hampshire		7 July 1916	23	Ovillers-la-Boisselle, France	
Thomas Askham	Northamptonshire		21 August 1916	19	Maillet Wood, Sheepal, France	
Charles Backman	South Australia		25 April 1915	31	Gallipoli, Ottoman Empire	
Harold Bache	Worcestershire		15 February 1916	26	Comines Canal Bank, Ypres, Belgium	
Francis Bacon	Hampshire		31 October 1915	46	at sea, on Yacht Aries off the coast of Belgium	
Herbert Bailey	Barbados		31 July 1917	27	Hollebeke, France	
James Balfour-Melville	Scotland		25 September 1915	33	Loos-en-Gohelle, France	
Cecil Banes-Walker	Somerset		9 May 1915	26	Ypres, Belgium	
Percy Banks	Somerset		26 April 1915	29	La Bricque, Ypres, Belgium	
Hugh Bannerman	Southland		23 December 1917	30	near Ypres, Belgium	
Bob Barry	Canterbury		3 December 1915	37	aboard HMS Dongola, off Gallipoli Peninsula	
Arthur Bateman	Ireland		28 March 1918	27	near Arras, France	
Samuel Bates	Warwickshire		28 August 1916	26	near Hardecourt, France	
Gordon Belcher	Hampshire		16 May 1915	29	near Richebourg, Belgium	
William Benton	Middlesex		17 August 1916	43	near Méricourt-l'Abbé, France	
Harry Biedermann	Argentina		10 August 1917	29	Houthulst, Belgium	
Frank Bingham	Derbyshire		22 May 1915	40	Sanctuary Wood, Ypres, Belgium	
Wilfred Bird	Oxford University		9 May 1915	31	Richebourg St Vaast, France	
Henry Blacklidge	Surrey		23 May 1917	32	Amarah, Mesopotamia	
Cecil Bodington	Hampshire		11 April 1917	37	near Arras, France	
William Boswell	Oxford University		28 July 1916	24	Thiepval, France	
Evelyn Bradford	Hampshire		14 September 1914	45	near Bucy-le-Long, Soissons, France	
Druce Brandt	Oxford University		6 July 1915	27	Boesinghe, Belgium	
Bernard Brodhurst	Hampshire		27 April 1915	41	near Canadian Farm, St Julien, Ypres, Belgium	
Thomas Bryden	Otago		12 October 1917	40	Ypres, Belgium	
William Burns	MCC		7 July 1916	32	Contalmaison, France	
Frederick Burr	Worcestershire		12 March 1915	27	Kemmel, Belgium	
Brian Butler	MCC		18 August 1916	40	Longueval, France	
Leo Butler	Tasmania		23 August 1916	33	Puchevillers, France	
Hugh Butterworth	Oxford University		25 September 1915	29	Hooge, Belgium	
Arthur Byng	Jamaica		14 September 1914	41	Vailly, France	
William Cadogan	Europeans (India)		12 November 1914	35	Ypres, Belgium	
Norman Callaway	New South Wales		3 May 1917	21	Second Battle of Bullecourt, France	
John Campbell	Argentina		2 December 1917	40	Honnechy, France	
William Carlsson	Western Province		14 July 1916	26	Delville Wood, France	
Hugo Charteris	Gloucestershire		23 April 1916	31	Katia, Egypt	
Esmé Chinnery	Surrey		18 January 1915	28	Issy, Paris, France	
Harry Chinnery	Surrey		28 May 1916	40	Monchy-le-Preux, France	
Gother Clarke	New South Wales		12 October 1917	42	Zonnebeke, Belgium	
Leonard Colbeck	Cambridge University		3 January 1918	32	at sea, off the Cape of Good Hope in HMS Ormonde	
Edward Coleman	Essex		2 April 1917	25	Salonica, Greece	
Christopher Collier	Worcestershire		25 August 1916	30	near Mametz, France	
Alexander Cowie	Cambridge University		7 April 1916	27	Amarah, Mesopotamia	
Maurice Coxhead	Oxford University		3 May 1917	27	near Monchy-le-Preux, France	
Alexander Crawford	Nottinghamshire		10 May 1916	24	Laventie, Richebourg-l'Avoué, France	
Eustace Crawley	Cambridge University		2 November 1914	46	Wytschaete, Hollebeke, Belgium	
Ernest Crawshaw	Canterbury		9 October 1918	29	Le Cateau, France	
William Crozier	Dublin University		1 July 1916	42	Thiepval, France	
Foster Cunliffe	Oxford University		10 July 1916	40	Ovillers-la-Boisselle, France	
Wilfred Curwen	MCC		9 May 1915	32	near Poperinghe, Belgium	
Edward Cuthbertson	Cambridge University		24 July 1917	29	Amarah, Mesopotamia	
Leslie Davidson	MCC		3 August 1915	65	Rouen, France	
Geoffrey Davies	Essex		26 September 1915	22	Hulluch, France	
Arthur Davis	Leicestershire		4 November 1916	34	near Albert, France	
Archibald Difford	Western Province		20 September 1918	35	Palestine	
George Docker	Marylebone Cricket Club		17 November 1914	38	Touquet, Belgium	
Ossie Douglas	Tasmania		24 April 1918	38	Dermancourt, near Albert, France	
Sholto Douglas	Middlesex		28 January 1916	42	Cambrin, Arras, France	
Geoffrey Dowling	Sussex		30 July 1915	23	Hooge, Belgium	
Frank Dredge	Wellington		22 August 1916	36	Somme, France	
Garnet Driver	Griqualand West		7 September 1916	32	East Africa	
William Drysdale	Europeans (India)		29 September 1916	39	Gueudecourt, France	
Arthur du Boulay	Kent		25 October 1918	38	Fillièvres, France	
Arthur Edwards	Europeans (India)		25 September 1915	44	Loos-en-Gohelle, France	
William Eltham	Tasmania		31 December 1916	30	near Lesboeuts, France	
Charles Eyre	Cambridge University		25 September 1915	32	near Loos-en-Gohelle, France	
Charles Farmer	Marylebone Cricket Club		18 August 1916	30	Longueval, France	
Charles Fisher	Sussex		31 May 1916	38	at sea, aboard HMS Invincible at Jutland	
Harold Forster	Hampshire		29 May 1918	39	Bouleuse Ridge, near Ventalay, France	
Theodore Fowler	Gloucestershire		17 August 1915	35	London County Hospital, Epsom, Surrey, England	
Harold Garnett	Lancashire		3 December 1917	38	Marcoing, Cambrai, France	
Hubert Garrett	Somerset		4 June 1915	29	near Achi Baba, Gallipoli, Ottoman Empire	
Laurence Gatenby	Tasmania		14 January 1917	27	Armentières, France	
Fairfax Gill	Yorkshire		1 November 1917	34	Wimereux, Boulogne, France	
Francis Gillespie	Surrey		18 June 1916	27	Ypres, Belgium	
George Gilroy	Oxford University		15 July 1916	26	Corbie-sur-Somme, France	
Andrew Given	Otago		19 July 1916	30	Pozieres, France	
Cecil Gold	Middlesex		3 July 1916	29	Ovillers-la-Boisselle, France	
Harold Goodwin	Cambridge University		24 April 1917	31	Arras, France	
Ronald Gordon	Europeans (India)		31 October 1914	37	Messines, France	
Lord Bernard Gordon-Lennox	Middlesex		10 November 1914	36	Kleinzillebeke, Belgium	
Eric Gore-Browne	Europeans (India)		3 July 1918	28	Namacurra, Portuguese East Africa	
Francis Gould	Europeans (India)		6 June 1915	33	Armentières, France	
Tom Grace	Wellington		8 August 1915	25	Monash Valley, Gallipoli, Ottoman Empire	
William Grant	Gloucestershire		26 September 1918	24	near Passchendaele, Belgium	
Herbert Green	Europeans (India)		31 December 1918	40	Rouen, France	
John Gregory	Hampshire		27 November 1914	27	near Zonnebeke, Belgium	
Robert Gregory	Ireland		23 January 1918	36	near Grossa, Padua, Italy	
Walter Greive	Scotland		1 April 1917	26	France	
William Greive	Scotland		17 July 1916	28	Siege Farm, Kemmel, France	
Neville Grell	Trinidad		5 June 1918	25	Trinidad	
John Gunner	Hampshire		9 August 1918	34	Kemmel, Belgium	
Ralph Hancock	Somerset		29 October 1914	26	Festubert, near La Bassee, France	
Charles Handfield	Transvaal		6 May 1915	36	Gibeon, South West Africa	
Alfred Hartley	Lancashire		9 October 1918	39	near Maissemy, France	
Eric Hatfeild	Kent		21 September 1918	31	Hargicourt, Cambrai, France	
Percy Heath	Europeans (India)		14 July 1917	40	Baghdad, Mesopotamia	
Ludovic Heathcoat-Amory	Oxford University		25 August 1918	37	Bayonvillers, France	
John Hellard	Somerset		2 July 1916	34	near Beaumont-Hamel, France	
Ralph Hemingway	Nottinghamshire		15 October 1915	37	Hohenzollern Redoubt, near Vermelles, France	
Rupert Hickmott	Canterbury		16 September 1916	22	Somme, France	
Charles Higginbotham	Army		11 March 1915	48	near Neuve-Chapelle, France	
Harold Hippisley	Somerset		23 October 1914	24	Langemarck, Belgium	
Harold Hodges	Nottinghamshire		22 March 1918	32	Ham, France	
William Holbech	Warwickshire, MCC		1 November 1914	32	Greenwich, England	
Bernard Holloway	MCC		27 September 1915	27	Loos-en-Gohelle, France	
Gerald Howard-Smith	Cambridge University		29 March 1916	36	Merville St Vaast, France	
Gilbert Howe	Wellington		10 January 1917	25	Messines, Belgium	
John Hunt	Middlesex		16 September 1916	41	near Ginchy, France	
de Courcy Ireland	Europeans (India)		28 January 1915	41	Hong Kong or Peking	
Arthur Isaac	Worcestershire		7 July 1916	42	Contalmaison, France	
John Isaac	Worcestershire		9 May 1915	35	Rouge Bancs, Fromelles Ridge, Armentières, France	
Geoffrey Jackson	Derbyshire		9 April 1917	23	Faimpoux, Arras, Belgium	
Arthur Jaques	Hampshire		27 September 1915	27	Bois Hugo, Loos-en-Gohelle, France	
Burnet James	Gloucestershire		26 September 1915	28	Langemark, Belgium	
Percy Jeeves	Warwickshire		22 July 1916	28	High Wood, Montauban-de-Picardie, France	
David Jennings	Kent		6 August 1918	29	Tunbridge Wells, Kent, England	
Robert Jesson	Hampshire		22 February 1917	30	near Kut, Mesopotamia	
Donald Johnston	Oxford University		13 September 1918	23	Beugneux, France	
Vivian Kavanagh	Auckland		9 August 1917	35	Ypres, Belgium	
Henry Keigwin	Essex		20 September 1916	35	near Thiepval, France	
David Kennedy	Scotland		1 July 1916	25	Somme, France	
William Kington	Europeans		20 October 1914	38	Zonnebeke, Belgium	
Gordon Kinvig	Wellington		31 July 1917	29	Ploegsteert Wood, near Ypres, Belgium	
Ronald Lagden	Oxford University		1 March 1915	25	St Eloi, Belgium	
Arthur Lang	Sussex		25 January 1915	24	Cuinchy, France	
Edwin Leat	Somerset		8 June 1918	33	near Beaumont-Hamel, France	
Lawrence Le Fleming	Kent		21 March 1918	38	Maissemy, France	
Logie Leggatt	Cambridge University		31 July 1917	22	Pilckem Ridge, Belgium	
Richard Lewis	Oxford University		7 September 1917	43	Ypres, Belgium	
Frank Lugton	Victoria		29 July 1916	22	near Villers-Bretonneux, France	
Joseph Lynch	Gentlemen of Ireland		25 September 1915	35	Loos-en-Gohelle, France	
Claude Mackay	Gloucestershire		7 June 1915	20	Boulogne, France	
George Macnamara	Ireland		18 August 1916	23	Loos-en-Gohelle, France	
Mark Mackenzie	Oxford University		25 September 1914	26	Soupir-sur-Aisne, Soissons, France	
Meredith Magniac	South Africa Army		25 April 1917	36	Monchy-le-Preux, France	
Walter Malcolm	Otago		23 December 1917	23	Poelcapelle, Belgium	
William Malraison	Transvaal		31 May 1916	39	East Africa	
Bruce Manson	Europeans (India)		4 November 1914	35	Tanga, Tanganyika, German East Africa	
Alan Marshal	Queensland, Surrey		23 July 1915	32	Imtarfa, Malta	
Edward Marvin	Transvaal		24 March 1918	39	Marrieres Wood, France	
Arthur Marsden	Derbyshire		31 July 1916	35	St Pancras, London, England	
Kenelm McCloughin	Free Foresters		26 September 1915	31	Hohenzollern Redoubt, near Cambrin, France	
Stanley McKenzie	Tasmania		8 December 1915	25	Alexandria, Egypt	
Harold Mead	Essex		13 April 1921	25	Bell Common, Essex, England	
Ralph Melville	Gentlemen of Philadelphia		4 March 1919	33	Wimereux, France	
Charles Minnaar	Western Province		16 November 1916	34	near Beaumont Hamel, France	
Jacky Morkel	Transvaal		15 May 1916	25	East Africa	
Claude Mulcahy	Natal		11 July 1916	30	Corbie-sur-Somme, France	
John Murray	Royal Navy		31 May 1916	42	at sea during the Battle of Jutland	
John Murray	Scotland		23 September 1917	35	near Poelcappelle, Belgium	
Edwin Myers	Surrey		15 September 1916	28	near Adanac, France	
Guy Napier	Cambridge University		25 September 1915	31	Loos-en-Gohelle, France	
George Neale	MCC		28 September 1915	46	near Loos-en-Gohelle, France	
John Nelson	Lancashire		12 August 1917	25	near Pilckem, France	
Arnold Nesbitt	Worcestershire		7 November 1914	36	Ploegsteert Wood, Belgium	
Bernard Nevile	Worcestershire		11 February 1916	27	near Ypres, Belgium	
Charles Newcombe	Derbyshire		27 December 1915	24	Fleurbaix, France	
William Odell	Leicestershire		4 October 1917	35	near Passchendaele, Belgium	
Cecil Palmer	Hampshire		26 July 1915	42	near Hill Q, Gallipoli, Ottoman Empire	
Ernest Parker	Western Australia		2 May 1918	34	Caëstre, France	
William Parker	MCC		30 July 1915	28	Hooge, Belgium	
Walter Parke	Army		13 October 1914	23	Hazebrouck, France	
Eric Penn	Cambridge University		18 October 1915	37	Hohenzollern, near Loos-en-Gohelle, France	
Charles Pepper	Nottinghamshire		13 September 1917	42	near La Clytte, Belgium	
Henry Persse	Hampshire		28 June 1918	32	near Saint-Omer, France	
Edward Phillips	Cambridge University		8 May 1915	32	near Ypres, Belgium	
George Poeppel	Queensland		2 February 1917	23	German POW camp, Germany	
Albert Pratt	Auckland		19 July 1916	23	Pozières, France	
Reggie Pridmore	Warwickshire		13 March 1918	31	near Piave River, north of Venice, Italy	
Donald Priestley	Gloucestershire		30 October 1917	30	Passchendale, Belgium	
Richard Rail	Western Province		9 October 1917	29	Houthulst Forest, Passchendale, Belgium	
John Raphael	Surrey		11 June 1917	35	Remy, Belgium	
Cyril Rattigan	Cambridge University		13 November 1916	32	near Beaucourt, France	
Rowland Raw	Gentlemen of England		7 August 1915	31	Suvla Bay, Gallipoli Peninsula, Ottoman Empire	
Wilfrid Reay	Gentlemen of England		8 October 1915	24	near Thiepval, France	
William Riley	Nottinghamshire		9 August 1917	28	near Coxyde, Belgium	
Francis Roberts	Gloucestershire		8 February 1916	33	St Julien, Ypres, Belgium	
Herbert Rogers	Hampshire		12 October 1916	23	Somme, France	
Henry Rosher	JG Greig's XI		14 April 1915	48	Shaibah, Mesopotamia	
James Rothery	Yorkshire		2 June 1919	41	Leeds, Yorkshire, England	
Eustace Rutter	Europeans		13 May 1915	44	Ypres, Belgium	
James Ryan	Northamptonshire		25 September 1915	23	Loos-en-Gohelle, France	
Oswald Samson	Somerset		7 September 1918	37	near Peronne, France	
George Sandeman	Hampshire		26 April 1915	33	Zonnebeke, Belgium	
Clifford Saville	Middlesex		8 November 1917	25	Fresnoy-le-Grand, Aisne, France	
Herbert Sharp	Hawke's Bay		1 September 1918	37	France	
Edward Shaw	Oxford University		7 October 1916	24	Le Sars, France	
Ernest Shorrocks	Somerset		20 July 1916	41	Thiepval, France	
Karl Siedle	Natal		30 May 1918	28	Doullens, Picardy, France	
Ernest Simpson	Kent		2 October 1917	41	Saint-Omer, France	
Leonard Slater	Gentlemen of the South		14 September 1914	38	Aisne, France	
Hubert Selwyn-Smith	Queensland		7 June 1917	25	Messines, France	
Allan Ivo Steel	MCC		8 October 1917	25	Langemark, Belgium	
Frank Street	Essex		7 July 1916	46	Ovillers-la-Boisselle, France	
Norman Street	Warwickshire		10 August 1915	33	Suvla Bay, Gallipoli, Turkey	
William Stuart	Scotland		23 April 1917	27	Arras, France	
Harvey Staunton	Nottinghamshire		14 January 1918	47	Arzizieh, Mesopotamia	
Henry Stricker	Transvaal		15 February 1917	29	Dodoma, Tanganyika, German East Africa	
James Sutcliffe	Hampshire		14 July 1915	38	Cape Helles, Gallipoli Peninsula, Ottoman Empire	
Leonard Sutton	Somerset		3 June 1916	26	Zillebeke, France	
Theodore Tapp	London County		21 October 1917	24	near Dozingham, Belgium	
Edmund Thomson	MCC		21 December 1914	40	Festubert, near La Bassée, France	
Charles Tomblin	Northamptonshire		1 June 1916	24	near Sissonne, France	
Attwood Torrens	MCC		8 December 1916	42	Pozières, France	
Francis Townend	Europeans (India)		29 March 1915	29	Béthune, France	
Geoffrey Toynbee	Hampshire		15 November 1914	29	Ploegstraete, Armentières, France	
Thomas Truman	Gloucestershire		14 September 1918	37	near Étrun, France	
Frederick Trumble	Royal Navy		10 May 1918	24	at sea, on board HMS Warwick	
Hervey Tudway	Somerset		18 November 1914	26	Boulogne, France	
Frank Tuff	Oxford University		5 November 1915	25	Imtarfa, Malta	
Hugh Tuke	Hawke's Bay		7 June 1915	30	at sea, off Gallipoli, Ottoman Empire	
Frederick Turner	Oxford University		10 January 1915	26	near Kemmel, Belgium	
Ronald Turner	Gloucestershire		15 August 1915	30	Suvla Bay, Gallipoli Peninsula, Ottoman Empire	
William Tyldesley	Lancashire		26 April 1918	30	Kemmel, Belgium	
James Valiant	Essex		28 October 1917	33	Gaza, Palestine	
Alan Wallace	Auckland		10 May 1915	24	at sea, off Gallipoli, Ottoman Empire	
Gerald Ward	MCC		30 October 1914	36	Zandvoorde, Belgium	
George Whatford	Sussex		22 November 1915	37	Ctesiphon, Ottoman Empire	
George Whitehead	Kent		17 October 1918	23	Lanwe, near Menen, Belgium	
Tony Wilding	Canterbury		9 May 1915	31	Neuve-Chapelle, France	
John Nathaniel Williams	Gloucestershire		25 April 1915	37	Gallipoli, Turkey	
Joseph Williams	MCC		10 July 1916	23	Thiepval, France	
Arthur Willmer	Oxford University		20 September 1916	26	Rouen, France	
Francis Wilson	Jamaica		24 May 1915	32	Cape Helles, Gallipoli Peninsula, Ottoman Empire	
George Wilson	Canterbury		14 December 1917	30	Ypres salient, Belgium	
Guy Wilson	Derbyshire		30 November 1917	35	Cambrai, France	
Archer Windsor-Clive	Cambridge University		25 August 1914	23	Landrecies, France	
John Winnington	Worcestershire		22 September 1918	42	near Kefar Kassin, Ramle, Palestine	
Geoffrey Wood	Oxford University		13 October 1915	24	Hohenzollern, near Loos-en-Gohelle, France	
Maxmillian Wood	Europeans (India)		22 August 1915	42	near Ismail Oglu Tepe, Gallipoli, Ottoman Empire	
Kenneth Woodroffe	Cambridge University		13 May 1915	22	near Neuve-Chapelle, France	
Richard Worsley	Orange Free State		4 May 1917	37	at sea, off Gulf of Genoa, Italy	
Oswald Wreford-Brown	Gloucestershire		7 July 1916	38	near Corbie, France	
Egerton Wright	Oxford University		11 May 1918	32	Barly, France	
Harold Wright	Leicestershire		14 September 1915	31	Marylebone, London, England	
Charles Yaldren	Hampshire		23 October 1916	24	Thiepval, France	
William Yalland	Gloucestershire		23 October 1914	25	Ypres, Belgium	
Charles Younger	Scotland		21 March 1917	31	St Leger, near Aveluy, France	

== Easter Rising (1916) ==
=== First-class cricketers ===
Name	Main first-class team	Ref	Date of death	Age	Place of death	Ref
Francis Browning	Ireland		26 April 1916	47	Dublin, Ireland	

== Irish War of Independence (1919–1921) ==
=== First-class cricketers ===
Name	Main first-class team	Ref	Date of death	Age	Place of death	Ref
James Airy	Europeans (India)		21 July 1920	36	Ballyvourney, County Cork, Ireland	
Hugh Montgomery	Somerset		10 December 1920	40	Bray, County Dublin, Ireland	

== World War II (1939–1945) ==
=== Test cricketers ===
Name	Test team	Ref	Date of death	Age	Place of death	Ref
Dooley Briscoe	South Africa		22 April 1941	30	Kombolcha, Ethiopia, Italian East Africa	
Ken Farnes	England		20 October 1941	30	Chipping Warden, Oxfordshire, England	
Ross Gregory	Australia		10 June 1942	26	near Gaffargaon, Bengal, India	
Arthur Langton	South Africa		27 November 1942	30	near Maiduguri, Nigeria	
Geoffrey Legge	England		21 November 1940	37	Brampford Speke, Devon, England	
George Macaulay	England		13 December 1940	43	Sullom Voe, Shetland Islands, Scotland	
Sonny Moloney	New Zealand		15 July 1942	31	Ruweisat Ridge, El Alamein, Egypt	
Maurice Turnbull	England		5 August 1944	38	near Montchamp, France	
Hedley Verity	England		31 July 1943	38	Caserta, Italy	

=== First-class cricketers ===
Name	Main first-class team	Ref	Date of death	Age	Place of death	Ref
Sidney Adams	Northamptonshire		24 March 1945	40	near Hamminkeln, Germany	
James Alexander	Bengal		23 October 1943	27	Bhawanipur, Bengal, India	
Leigh Alexander	Europeans (India)		28 April 1943	44	Burma	
Robert Alexander	Ireland		19 July 1943	32	near Catania, Sicily, Italy	
Michael Anderson	Cambridge University		10 May 1940	23	Hoogvliet, Netherlands	
Francis Arkwright	Hampshire		1 July 1942	37	Knightsbridge, near Acroma, Libya	
Claude Ashton	Essex		31 October 1942	41	Caernarvon, Wales	
Glen Baker	Queensland		15 December 1943	28	Buna, New Guinea	
Peter Bairnsfather-Cloete	Western Province		19 December 1942	25	Kisumu, Kenya	
William Baldock	Somerset		30 December 1941	41	Jabor Valley, Trengganu, Malaya	
Tristan Ballance	Oxford University		4 December 1943	27	near Naples, Italy	
Clifford Barker	Transvaal		27 July 1942	25	El Alamein, Egypt	
Freeman Barnardo	Middlesex		25 October 1942	24	ten miles west of El Alamein, Egypt	
Stanley Behrend	Bengal		30 May 1944	35	Imphal, Manipur, India	
Montague Bennett	Minor Counties		17 December 1940	28	at sea, on HMS Acheron, off the Isle of Wight	
Thomas Bevan	Army		12 June 1942	42	Tobruk, Libya	
Peter Blagg	Oxford University		18 March 1943	24	near Donbaik, Burma	
John Blake	Cambridge University; Hampshire		3 June 1944	26	near Brač, Yugoslavia	
Charles Blount	Royal Air Force		23 October 1940	46	Hendon Aerodrome, Colindale, Middlesex, England	
Norman Bowell	Hampshire		5 March 1943	39	at sea, off the coast of Singapore	
Paul Brooks	Middlesex		26 January 1946	24	Paddington, London, England	
James Bruce-Jones	Scotland		29 April 1943	32	Enfidaville, French Tunisia	
Anthony Burke	Europeans		17 February 1942	45	Kyaikto, British Burma	
Reginald Butterworth	Middlesex		21 May 1940	33	Saint-Martin-au-Laërt, near Saint-Omer, France	
John Butterworth	Oxford University		18 March 1941	35	Shooter's Hill, London, England	
Frederick Campling	Orange Free State		22 March 1945	36	British Borneo	
Bill Carson	Auckland		8 October 1944	28	at sea, on board ship between Bari, Italy and Egypt	
Gerry Chalk	Kent		17 February 1943	32	Louches, near Calais, France	
Peter Cherrington	Leicestershire		20 January 1945	27	Monywa, Myanmar	
Vivian Chiodetti	Hyderabad Cricket Association XI		17 January 1942	38	Kyaumedaung, Burma	
Alfred Cobden	Canterbury		24 October 1942	29	El Alamein, Egypt	
Arthur Cocks	Army		6 June 1944	39	Ouistreham, France	
Colin Cokayne-Frith	Army		18 May 1940	40	Assche, Belgium	
Joseph Connaughton	Middlesex		12 February 1944	25	at sea, One and a Half Degree Channel, Maldives	
Paul Cressall	British Guiana		8 April 1943	49	Hong Kong	
Ronald Crook	Wellington		17 January 1943	35	Tripoli, Libya	
Grahame Cruickshanks	Eastern Province		8 September 1941	28	Berlin, Germany	
David Day	Europeans (India)		22 February 1944	27	Arakan, Burma	
Eric Dixon	Oxford University		20 April 1941	25	flying from HMS Formidable off the coast of Tripoli, Libya	
Harold Dods	Minor Counties		18 June 1944	35	Westminster, London, England	
Conan Doyle	Orange Free State		24 October 1942	29	Egypt	
Howard Dunbar	Europeans (India)		23 July 1942	37	Ruweisat Ridge, El Alamein, Egypt	
Peter Eckersley	Lancashire		13 August 1940	36	in a flying accident near Eastleigh, Hampshire, England	
Allan Edwards	Otago		18 August 1942	22	at sea, off Cherbourg, France	
Alfred Evans	Hampshire		29 December 1944	60	at sea, over the Atlantic Ocean	
Richard Evans	Border		29 May 1943	28	at sea, off Cape Town, Cape Province, South Africa	
Dudley Everett	Western Australia		3 May 1943	31	Ontario, Canada	
George Fenton	Viceroy's XI		26 May 1944	34	Palena, Italy	
Geoffrey Fletcher	Oxford University		27 March 1943	23	Djebel Saikra, Matmata, Tunisia	
Hubert Freakes	Eastern Province		10 March 1942	28	Weston-super-Mare, Somerset, England	
Albert Freeman	Surrey		7 January 1945	57	Greenwich, London, England	
John Gartly	Transvaal		22 November 1941	33	Sidi Rezegh, Libya	
Ernest Gasson	Canterbury		7 September 1942	34	El Alamein, Egypt	
Ronald Gerrard	Somerset		22 January 1943	30	near Tripoli, Libya	
Edward Gibson	Rangoon Gymkhana		11 August 1944	45	Bangkok, Thailand	
James Grimshaw	Cambridge University		26 September 1944	32	Nijmegen–Arnhem region, Netherlands	
Lancelot Grove	Army		9 February 1943	37	Gander, Newfoundland	
John Halliday	Oxford University		3 December 1945	30	Rochefort, Puy-de-Dôme, France	
Cyril Hamilton	Kent		10 February 1941	31	Keren, Eritrea, Italian East Africa	
Eric Hamilton	Transvaal		15 July 1943	30	over Sicily, Italy	
Leslie Hancock	Marylebone Cricket Club		12 July 1944	44	Maupertus-sur-Mer, Normandy, France	
Geoffrey Hart-Davis	Natal		9 December 1941	36	Sidi Rezegh, Libya	
David Hayward	Middlesex		21 April 1945	24	Lasham Hill Farm, Hampshire, England	
Ronald Hewat	Griqualand West		15 February 1944	56	Cape Town, Cape Province, South Africa	
Francis Hodder	Royal Air Force		6 September 1943	36	near Rhein, Germany	
Alec Howie	Army (India)		22 May 1940	26	Escaut River, Belgium	
Bernard Howlett	Kent		29 November 1943	44	Santa Maria Imbaro, Italy	
Roger Human	Worcestershire		21 November 1942	33	Bangalore, Karnataka, India	
Harold Jameson	Cambridge University		26 August 1940	22	Portsmouth, England	
Gilbert Jose	South Australia		27 March 1942	43	Changi POW Camp, Singapore	
George Kemp-Welch	Warwickshire		18 June 1944	36	Westminster, London, England	
Frank Kerr	Otago		24 July 1943	26	Solomon Islands	
Stuart King	Victoria		28 February 1943	36	at sea, Coral Sea, Pacific Ocean	
Jack Lee	Somerset		20 June 1944	42	near Bazenville, Normandy, France	
Geoffrey Longfield	Royal Air Force		25 February 1943	33	Rennes, France	
Michael Matthews	Oxford University		29 May 1940	26	Dunkirk, France	
Michael Maw	Cambridge University		13 August 1944	31	near Alzey, Germany	
Charles Mayo	Somerset		10 April 1943	40	near Alexandria, Egypt	
Norman McMillan	Auckland		16 July 1942	35	El Alamein, Egypt	
Alastair McNeil	Scotland		26 January 1944	28	Anzio, Italy	
Peter McRae	Somerset		25 February 1944	28	Barents Sea (aboard HMS Mahratta), England	
Michael Magill	Oxford University		5 September 1940	24	Filey, England	
David Merry	Trinidad		4 May 1944	21	Canada	
David Monaghan	South Island Army		27 January 1944	21	Caserta, Italy	
Edward Moss	Oxford University		31 March 1944	32	Rimbach, Germany	
Alastair Monteath	Otago		27 June 1942	28	Western Desert, Libya	
Ross Moyle	South Australia		24 October 1942	29	Cairo, Egypt	
Henry Myles	Western Province		15 June 1942	31	Kirkinner, Dumfries, Scotland	
Robert Nelson	Northamptonshire		29 October 1940	28	Deal, Kent, England	
Charles Orton	Europeans (India)		28 May 1940	29	near Wormhout, France	
Charles Packe	Leicestershire		1 July 1944	35	Chateau de la Londs, Caen, Normandy, France	
Christiaan Papenfus	Orange Free State		18 November 1941	25	Gazala, Libya	
Wilfred Parry	Natal		23 July 1942	31	Ruweisat Ridge, Egypt	
Alan Pearsall	Tasmania		8 March 1944	28	over English Channel	
John Pelly	Royal Navy		6 June 1945	56	Hove, Sussex, England	
William Pershke	Oxford University		21 January 1944	25	at sea, on active service	
Robert Philpot-Brookes	Europeans (India)		29 May 1940	27	St Eloi, France	
David Price	Western Province		6 July 1942	31	at sea, off Iceland	
Donald Ray	Marylebone Cricket Club		12 July 1944	41	on board a hospital ship off Southampton, England	
Jack Richards	Cambridge University		2 November 1944	26	Gelderland, Netherlands	
Kenneth Ridings	South Australia		17 May 1943	23	over Bay of Biscay	
Patrick Rucker	Oxford University		20 May 1940	40	Amiens, France	
Kenneth Scott	Oxford University		9 August 1943	27	Bronte, Sicily, Italy	
Peter Scott	Oxford University		13 June 1944	32	Villers-Bocage, France	
Gerald Seeley	Worcestershire		23 July 1941	38	at sea off Ostend, Belgium	
John Shadwell	Europeans (India)		25 April 1942	23	Sagar, Madhya Pradesh, India	
Alexander Shaw	Bengal		19 July 1945	37	New Delhi, India	
Francis Sides	Victoria		25 August 1943	29	Kunai Spur, Salamaua, New Guinea	
Charles Spencer	Oxford University		29 September 1941	38	South Havant, Hampshire, England	
Ralph Spitteler	Europeans (India)		14 March 1946	30	Jakarta, Java, Dutch East Indies	
Robert Stephenson	Royal Navy		9 November 1942	36	at sea aboard HMS Cromer, off Mersa Matruh, Egypt	
Charles Sutton	South Americans		29 July 1945	38	Gosport, Hampshire, England	
George Talbot	Canterbury		15 December 1943	36	Orsogna, Italy	
Frank Thorn	Victoria		11 February 1942	29	Gasmata, New Guinea	
Gordon Thorne	Army		2 March 1942	44	at sea, in the Indian Ocean	
Richard Tindall	Oxford University		22 January 1942	29	Jadabia, Libya	
Edward Titley	Cambridge University		17 July 1943	31	Moita, County Meath, Ireland	
Charlie Walker	South Australia		18 December 1942	33	Soltau, Germany	
David Walker	Oxford University		7 February 1942	28	on a flight over Norway, and buried at Trondheim, Norway	
Donald Walker	Hampshire		18 June 1941	28	flying 2 km north of Best, Netherlands	
Henry Walters	Auckland		25 August 1944	26	at sea, English Channel	
Clement Wareham	Wellington		30 September 1940	29	Hollingbourne, Kent, England	
Geoffrey Warren	Roshanara Club		21 November 1941	33	Libya	
David Warburton	Oxford University		4 February 1941	21	near Crewe, Cheshire, England	
David Watson	Oxford University		3 October 1943	23	United States of America	
William Welch	Free Foresters		25 May 1940	28	Calais, France	
Robin Whetherly	Oxford University		27 November 1943	27	near Glamoč, Yugoslavia	
Peter Whitehouse	Oxford University		19 November 1943	26	Archi, Italy	
John Whitty	Army		23 October 1944	34	Vicchio, Florence, Italy	
Alec Wills	Combined Services		7 November 1941	30	Kallang, Singapore	
Roger Winlaw	Cambridge University		31 October 1942	30	Caernarvon, Wales	
Denys Witherington	Cambridge University		16 February 1944	22	near Anzio, Italy	
Barney Wood	Western Australia		9 June 1941	39	Syria	

== South African Border War (1966–1989) ==
=== First-class cricketers ===
Name	Main first-class team	Ref	Date of death	Age	Place of death	Ref
Gary Bricknell	Western Province		25 March 1977	22	Keetmanshoop, South West Africa	

== See also ==
- Cricket in World War I
- Cricket in World War II
- List of cricketers who were murdered
