= Clarence Buss =

English cricketer

Personal information
- Full name: Clarence Harold Henry Buss
- Born: 19 February 1913; Weybridge, Surrey, England
- Died: 6 December 1974 (aged 61); Addlestone, Surrey, England
- Batting: Left-handed
- Bowling: Slow left-arm orthodox

Domestic team information
- Years: Team
- 1934: Surrey

Career statistics
Competition	First-class
Matches	1
Runs scored	47
Batting average	23.50
100s/50s	–/–
Top score	42
Balls bowled	252
Wickets	2
Bowling average	71.50
5 wickets in innings	–
10 wickets in match	–
Best bowling	2/90
Catches/stumpings	–/–
- Source: Cricinfo, 28 August 2012

Clarence Harold Henry Buss (19 February 1913 – 6 December 1974) was an English cricketer. Buss was a left-handed batsman who bowled slow left-arm orthodox. He was born at Weybridge, Surrey. He was more commonly known as Sam Buss in scorecards.

Buss made a single first-class appearance for Surrey against Oxford University in 1934 at The Oval. Surrey won the toss and elected to bat first, making 483 all out, with Buss scoring 42 runs before he was dismissed by Richard Tindall. Oxford University then made 305 all out in their first-innings, with Buss taking the wickets of Gerry Chalk and Tindall, finishing the innings with figures of 2/90. Forced to follow-on, Oxford University made 280/7 declared, with Buss bowling seventeen wicketless overs which conceded 53 runs. Set a target of 103 for victory, Surrey reached their target for the loss of five wickets, with Buss one of the wickets to fall, dismissed for 7 runs by Edwin Barlow. This was his only major appearance for Surrey.

He died at Addlestone, Surrey, on 6 December 1974.
