= Kinvig (surname) =

Kinvig is a surname particularly associated with the Isle of Man. Notable people include:

- Alfred Kinvig (1874–1965), New Zealand cricketer.
- Clifford Kinvig (1934–2017), lecturer in war studies at the Royal Military Academy, Sandhurst, from a family of Isle of Man roots.
- Gordon Kinvig (1888–1917), New Zealand soldier and sportsman.
- Sage Kinvig (c.1870–1962), at the time of her death, one of the last surviving native speakers of the Manx language.
