= Edwin Myers =

Edwin Myers may refer to:

- Edwin Myers (pole vaulter) (1896–1978), American pole vaulter
- Edwin Myers (sportsman) (1888–1916), English cricketer and footballer
