= Bricknell =

Bricknell is a surname. Notable people with the surname include:

- Bruce Bricknell (1935–1982), New Zealand cricket umpire
- Gary Bricknell (1954–1977), South African first-class cricketer
- Martin Bricknell, British physician and former British Army officer

== See also ==
- Brickell
