= Geoffrey Fletcher =

Geoffrey Fletcher may refer to:

- Geoffrey S. Fletcher (born 1970), American filmmaker and professor
- Geoffrey Scowcroft Fletcher (1923–2004), British artist and art critic
- Geoffrey Fletcher (cricketer) (1919–1943), English cricketer
