= Percy Heath (disambiguation) =

Percy Heath was a musician.

Percy Heath may also refer to:

- Percy Heath (cricketer) in Hong Kong national cricket team
- Percy Heath (screenwriter) (1884-1933), American screenwriter
