= Harry Biedermann =

Argentine/English cricketer

Personal information
- Full name: Harry Ernest Charles Biedermann
- Born: 4 September 1887; Eton, Buckinghamshire, England
- Died: 10 August 1917 (aged 29) near Houthulst, Passchendaele salient, Belgium
- Role: Middle-order batsman

International information
- National side: Argentina (1912)
- Source: CricketArchive, 30 April 2016

Harry Ernest Charles Biedermann (4 September 1887 – 10 August 1917) played two matches of first-class cricket in 1912, representing the Argentine national team. He was killed in the First World War.

== Cricket career ==
Born in Eton, Buckinghamshire, Biedermann attended Harrow School, playing for the school cricket team. After moving to Argentina, he made his debut in the annual North v South fixture in 1909, representing the South. However, he switched to the North for the 1913 and 1914 editions of the fixture. In February 1912, Biedermann was selected to represent Argentina in two matches against the Marylebone Cricket Club, a touring team from England that included several Test-level players. In the first match, he made only two runs in the first innings, but in the second innings finished with eight not out as his team won by four wickets. In the second match, he played little part, scoring four runs in the first innings and 14 in the second. Both matches were later accorded first-class status.

== Military career and death ==
Biedermann left Argentina in late 1914 to enlist in the British Army. He had been employed at the estancia La Marion (in Buenos Aires Province) prior to his departure. Biedermann was initially attached to the 3rd County of London Yeomanry (Sharpshooters), with the rank of troop sergeant, and saw service in the Gallipoli Campaign. While on leave in England, he was recommended for a commission. This was given in August 1916, when he was promoted second lieutenant in the Queen's Own Oxfordshire Hussars. However, Biedermann only remained with the Hussars for three months before transferring to the Royal Flying Corps, a predecessor of the Royal Air Force. After gaining his pilot's certificate, he was sent to France in July 1917. The following month, Biedermann was sent out on a photographic reconnaissance flight to support the capture of Westhoek over the forest near Houthulst, Belgium, but did not return. His DH.5 is believed to have been shot down by the German flying ace Otto Könnecke. His body was not recovered, but he is commemorated on the Arras Flying Services Memorial in France. At least one other prominent Argentine cricketer – John Campbell – was also killed in the war.

== See also ==
- List of cricketers who were killed during military service
