= Reginald Butterworth =

English cricketer

Personal information
- Full name: Reginald Edmund Compton Butterworth
- Born: 16 August 1906; Semarang, Dutch East Indies
- Died: 21 May 1940 (aged 33) near Saint-Martin-au-Laërt, France
- Batting: Right-handed
- Bowling: Right-arm fast-medium
- Role: All-rounder
- Relatives: John Butterworth (brother)

Domestic team information
- Years: Team
- 1926–1927: Oxford University
- 1930–1939: Marylebone Cricket Club
- 1935–1937: Middlesex
- Source: ESPNcricinfo, 2 February 2016

Reginald Edmund Compton Butterworth (16 August 1906 – 21 May 1940) was an English cricketer who played at first-class level for Oxford University and Middlesex.

== Early life ==
Butterworth was born in Semarang, Java (then part of the Dutch East Indies), and was educated at Harrow School before going on to Christ Church, Oxford. He made his first-class debut for Oxford in May 1926. Butterworth's maiden first-class century came the following season, when he made 101 against the Free Foresters. He also scored 110 against Surrey a few games later, which was to be his highest first-class score. Butterworth made his County Championship debut for Middlesex in 1935, against Warwickshire, and played two further seasons at the county. In 1937, he toured Ceylon and Malaya with a team organised by British businessman and cricket enthusiast Sir Julien Cahn, which was his only overseas tour. Butterworth's final first-class appearance came in May 1939, when he played for the Marylebone Cricket Club (MCC) against Yorkshire.

== Military service and death ==
In the Second World War, Butterworth enlisted with the Royal Air Force (RAF). In May 1940, while serving as an air gunner with the rank of pilot officer on a Westland Lysander captained by Flight Lieutenant Richard Graham as part No. 13 Squadron, Butterworth was shot down over Saint-Omer and crashed near Saint-Martin-au-Laërt, killing him and Graham. His older brother, John Compton Butterworth, who was also a first-class cricketer, was killed in action less than a year later.

== See also ==
- List of cricketers who were killed during military service
