= John Shadwell =

John Shadwell may refer to:

- John Shadwell (cricketer)
- John Shadwell (physician)
