= Andrew Given =

New Zealand cricketer

Personal information
- Full name: Andrew Moncrieff Given
- Born: 30 January 1886; Dunedin, Otago, New Zealand
- Died: 19 July 1916 (aged 30); Pozieres, Somme, France

Domestic team information
- Years: Team
- 1914/15: Otago
- Source: CricInfo, 12 May 2016

Andrew Moncrieff Given (Note: Some sources spell Given's middle name with only one f.) (30 January 1886 – 19 July 1916) was a New Zealand cricketer. He played one first-class match for Otago during the 1914–15 season. He was killed in action during World War I.

Given was born at Dunedin in 1886 and was educated at Otago Boys' High School in the city. Prior to World War I he worked as a stationery salesman. He enlisted in the Australian Imperial Force in January 1915, joining the 8th battalion of the AIF at Melbourne.

After training, Given embarked for Europe in September 1915 and served with the battalion during the Gallipoli campaign from December until the end of the campaign the following month. After time in Egypt, he transferred to the 60th battalion and moved to France in June 1916. He was reported as missing in action on 19 July near Pozieres on the Western Front, presumed killed on the same day and in the same battle in which Auckland player Albert Pratt was killed. The action Given and Pratt were killed in preceded the Battle of Pozières and was part of the Battle of the Somme. His body was never recovered and he is commemorated on the Australian Memorial at Fromelles in France and in Andersons Bay Cemetery in Dunedin.

== See also ==
- List of cricketers who were killed during military service
