= Lestock =

Lestock is both a placename, a surname and a forename, and may refer to one of the following:

As a surname

- Richard Lestock, Royal Navy officer

As a forename

- Lestock Adams, English cricketer
- Lestock Robert Reid, Governor of Mumbai, India
- Lestock Graham DesBrisay, Canadian businessman
- Lestock P. W. DesBrisay, Canadian businessman

As a place

- Lestock, Saskatchewan, a Canadian village

Other uses

- Lestock the coyote, mascot of the Loyal Edmonton Regiment, Canada
