= Laurence Gatenby =

Australian cricketer

Personal information
- Full name: Laurence Frank Gatenby
- Born: 10 April 1889; Epping Forest, Tasmania, Australia
- Died: 14 January 1917 (aged 27); Armentieres, France

Domestic team information
- Years: Team
- 1913-1914: Tasmania
- Source: Cricinfo, 23 January 2016

Laurence Gatenby (10 April 1889 – 14 January 1917) was an Australian cricketer. He played two first-class matches for Tasmania between 1913 and 1914. He was killed in action during World War I.

== See also ==
- List of Tasmanian representative cricketers
- List of cricketers who were killed during military service
