= Dudley Forbes (cricketer) =

Irish-born English cricketer

Personal information
- Full name: Dudley Henry Forbes
- Born: 13 January 1873; Naas, County Kildare, Ireland
- Died: 21 April 1901 (aged 28); Kroonstad, Orange River Colony
- Batting: Right-handed
- Bowling: Right-arm fast
- Role: Bowler
- Relatives: Alan Hotham (brother-in-law)

International information
- National side: Scotland (1899)

Domestic team information
- Years: Team
- 1894–1899: Oxford University
- 1898: Marylebone Cricket Club
- Source: CricketArchive, 30 April 2016

Captain Dudley Henry Forbes (13 January 1873 – 21 April 1901) played first-class cricket for Oxford University and the Marylebone Cricket Club (MCC). Born in Ireland and educated in England, he was an officer of the British Army during the Second Boer War, but died during the conflict.

Forbes was born at Forenaughts House, near Naas, County Kildare, Ireland. Sent to England to be educated, he attended Eton College before going on to Christ Church, Oxford. Forbes made his first-class debut for Oxford University in 1894, in a 12-per-side match against A. J. Webbe's XI. A right-arm fast bowler, he took 6/86 in his opponent's only innings, which were to be the best bowling figures of his first-class career. Later in 1894, Forbes also took 5/21 against an MCC team, and played in the annual University Match against Cambridge University. He played only twice for Oxford during the 1895 season (against Somerset and the MCC), and after that did not return to first-class level until the 1898 season, when he represented the MCC against Oxford. Forbes' final first-class appearance came in June 1899, for an "Oxford University Past and Present" team against the touring Australians. He took 6/100 opening the bowling with Foster Cunliffe, dismissing the noted batsmen Joe Darling, Jack Worrall, and Victor Trumper.

A captain in the 3rd (Militia) Battalion Royal Scots, Forbes briefly played club cricket for the West of Scotland Cricket Club, and in May 1899 represented Scotland in a three-day match against Lancashire. In March 1900, his battalion was sent to South Africa to fight in the Second Boer War. Forbes saw service in both the Cape Colony and the Orange River Colony, including a brief period as commandant at Roodeval Spruit. He died of enteric fever in April 1901, at Kroonstad. Forbes's brother-in-law, Alan Hotham, also played first-class cricket, making a single appearance for Hampshire in 1901.

== See also ==
- List of cricketers who were killed during military service
- Dubhaltach Mac Fhirbhisigh, historian, anglicised as 'Dudley Forbes'
