= Allan Edwards (New Zealand cricketer) =

New Zealand cricketer

Personal information
- Full name: Allan James Edwards
- Born: 12 April 1920; Dunedin, Otago, New Zealand
- Died: 18 August 1942 (aged 22); English Channel, off Cherbourg, France

Domestic team information
- Years: Team
- 1940/41: Otago
- Source: ESPNcricinfo, 8 May 2016

Allan James Edwards (12 April 1920 – 18 August 1942) was a New Zealand sportsman. He played one first-class cricket match for Otago during the 1940–41 season. He was killed in action during World War II.

== Early life ==
Edwards was born at Dunedin in 1920, the son of Lewis and Isabella Edwards (née Ritchie), of Andersons Bay, a suburb of the city. He was educated at Otago Boys' High School and studied at the University of Otago. He worked as a clerk for W. E. Reid, a firm of accountants in Dunedin.

The family later moved to Tainui, a neighbouring suburb of the city. Two of his brothers served during World War II.

== Sporting life ==
Edwards played club cricket for the Otago Old Boys' side, making his senior club debut in March 1939, scoring a "changeless" 71 runs showcasing "really excellent" batting. He is described in The Evening Star as driving the ball well and playing "crisp, back foot shots" against shorter pitched deliveries in "a most attractive knock", which the paper described as ""as good an innings as we have seen in club cricket this season". It went on to describe him "sound material likely to mould into something first class". He first played cricket for Otago in the annual match against Southland later the same year, in an early season match in October, a fixture that was not first-class at the time. (Note: The Otago–Southland match had been first-class in the past and remained an annual fixture.) He played in the corresponding fixture in 1940, taking two wickets and scoring a half-century, before making his first-class debut in the Christmas Day match against Canterbury at Lancaster Park in Christchurch, one of six first-class matches played in New Zealand during the 1940–41 season. He scored 16 runs in his first innings and recorded a duck in his second and did not bowl.

As well as cricket, Edwards was a noted rugby union player and was an alpine mountaineer and skier. He played rugby for Southern Club as a fly-half or inside centre and "showed considerable promise" in his two seasons for the side. In September 1940, in his final season, he was described as "one of the most promising inside backs in the competition", with a match report commending him for a "particularly fine individualistic" try scored against the Varsity club. He was "one of the foremost active members" of the local branch of the New Zealand Alpine Club and a member of the Otago Ski Club.

== Wartime service and death ==
After enlisting at Levin in January 1941, Edwards served during the war with the Royal New Zealand Air Force. After initial training in No. 3 Elementary Flying Training School at RNZAF Station Harewood, he embarked for Canada for further training at 32 Service Flying Training School at RCAF Station Moose Jaw.

After being promoted to the rank of Flight Sergeant, he was shipped to the United Kingdom where he saw active service as a Spitfire pilot in No. 129 Squadron RAF from early 1942. He flew in a total of 105 sorties, and was shot down on 5 June 1942, bailing out before being recovered and returned to his base; he is known to have been responsible for at least one enemy aircraft being shot down. The following month, Edwards was shot down again, this time without bailing out and was killed, the action taking place on 18 August off the coast of France, close to Cherbourg. His body was recovered on 27 August and was buried at Felixstowe New Cemetery in Suffolk. He was aged 22.

== See also ==
- List of cricketers who were killed during military service
