= Ralph Melville =

Scottish–American cricketer and Canadian Expeditionary Force soldier

Personal information
- Full name: Ralph Leslie Melville
- Born: 12 May 1885; Glasgow, Lanarkshire, Scotland
- Died: 4 March 1919 (aged 33); Wimereux, Pas-de-Calais, France
- Batting: Unknown
- Bowling: Right-arm fast-medium

Career statistics
Competition	First-class
Matches	1
Runs scored	0
Batting average	0.00
100s/50s	–/–
Top score	0
Balls bowled	60
Wickets	0
Bowling average	–
5 wickets in innings	–
10 wickets in match	–
Best bowling	–
Catches/stumpings	1/–
- Source: Cricinfo, 1 April 2021

Ralph Leslie Melville (12 May 1885 – 4 March 1919) was a Scottish-born American first-class cricketer and a soldier in the Canadian Expeditionary Force in the First World War.

Melville was born at Glasgow in May 1885. An emigrant to the United States, he settled in Philadelphia where he played club cricket for Merion Cricket Club and Belmont Cricket Club, playing in the Halifax Cup for both clubs between 1907 and 1917. An all-rounder, Melville made one appearance in first-class cricket for the Gentlemen of Philadelphia against the touring Australians at Haverford in 1913. In a drawn 2-day match, he batted once and was dismissed without scoring by Sid Emery. With his right-arm fast-medium bowling, he ten overs, though was uneconomical, conceding 63 runs. Melville headed north to Canada in the First World War, enlisting as a private with the 15th Canadian Infantry (1st Central Ontario Regiment) as part of the Canadian Expeditionary Force. He survived the fighting only to die at Wimereux in March 1919 from pneumonia resulting from the Spanish flu. He was buried at the Terlincthun British Cemetery at Boulogne. Melville is the last recorded cricketer to die while on active service during the First World War, some three months after Herbert Green, the last combat related death of a first-class cricketer.
