= Francis Gillespie =

English cricketer

Francis Sydney Gillespie
Personal information
- Born: 26 March 1889; Upper Norwood, Surrey
- Died: 18 June 1916 (aged 27); Mount Sorrel, Ypres salient, Belgium
- Source: Cricinfo, 12 March 2017

Francis Sydney Gillespie (26 March 1889 – 18 June 1916) was an English cricketer. He played six first-class matches for Surrey in 1913. He was killed in action during World War I.

Gillespie was the son of John Gillespie, a Scottish engineer, and his wife, Eleanor. He attended Dulwich College between 1902 and 1904, and in his final year was in the 2nd XI cricket team. After leaving the school, he joined his father's business, but continued to pursue his interest in cricket. He was called up to the Surrey 2nd XI in 1912 and was promoted to the 1st XI the following year.

Gillespie joined the Honourable Artillery Company shortly after the start of the First World War, but accepted a commission in the Royal Sussex Regiment soon afterwards. He was promoted to Captain in July 1915 and was sent to Ypres, Belgium in March the following year. On 17 June 1916, he was injured by enemy fire while leading a reconnaissance mission. He died of his wounds the following day. He is buried at the Merville Communal Cemetery in northern France.

== See also ==
- List of Surrey County Cricket Club players
- List of cricketers who were killed during military service
