= Gother Clarke =

Australian cricketer

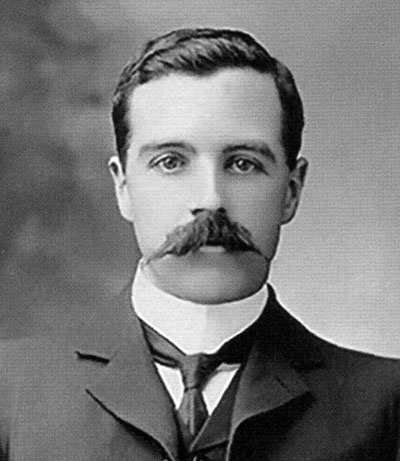

Personal information
- Full name: Gother Robert Carlisle Clarke
- Born: 27 April 1875; Sydney, Australia
- Died: 12 October 1917 (aged 42); Polygon Wood, Passchendaele salient, Belgium
- Batting: Left-handed
- Bowling: Right-arm leg-spin

Domestic team information
- Years: Team
- 1899-1900 to 1901-02: New South Wales

Career statistics
Competition	First-class
Matches	7
Runs scored	140
Batting average	12.72
100s/50s	0/0
Top score	25
Balls bowled	1726
Wickets	28
Bowling average	31.21
5 wickets in innings	1
10 wickets in match	1
Best bowling	6/133
Catches/stumpings	13/0
- Source: ESPNcricinfo, 11 January 2021

Gother Clarke (27 April 1875 – 12 October 1917) was an Australian cricketer and medical doctor.

== Life and career ==
Clarke was born in Sydney, the grandson of the geologist William Branwhite Clarke. He attended Sydney Church of England Grammar School and the University of Sydney, where he studied medicine. In a match for the university cricket team against Melbourne University in 1898 he took 7 for 72 and 6 for 89 and scored 100.

He played seven first-class matches as a leg-spin bowler and lower-order batsman for New South Wales between 1899 and 1902. His best performance was against the touring English team in 1901-02, when he took 4 for 98 and 6 for 133 in New South Wales' 53-run victory. He was also prominent in tennis and bowls, once winning the New South Wales bowls pairs title.

Clarke served as a major in the medical corps of the 34th Australian Infantry Battalion during World War I. He was killed in action in the First Battle of Passchendaele. After he left his medical station to treat a casualty in the field, Clarke and several others were killed by a shell.

== See also ==
- List of New South Wales representative cricketers
- List of cricketers who were killed during military service
