= Francis Sides =

Australian cricketer (1913–1943)

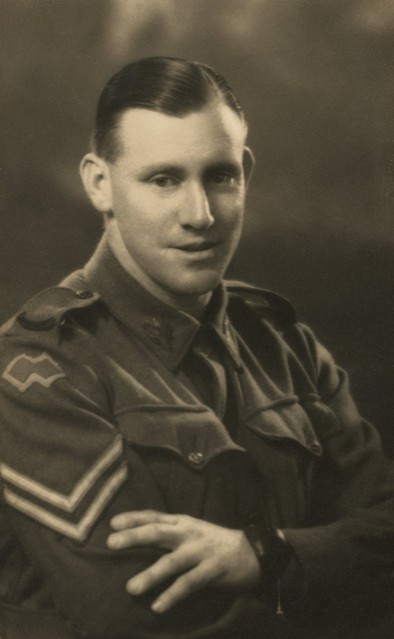

Personal information
- Full name: Francis William Sides
- Born: 15 December 1913; Mackay, Queensland, Australia
- Died: 25 August 1943 (aged 29); Salamaua, Territory of New Guinea

Domestic team information
- Years: Team
- 1937-1939: Victoria
- Source: Cricinfo, 22 November 2015

Francis William Sides (15 December 1913 – 25 August 1943) was an Australian cricketer. He played 14 first-class cricket matches for Victoria between 1937 and 1939.

== See also ==
- List of Victoria first-class cricketers
- List of cricketers who were killed during military service
