= Frank Dredge =

New Zealand cricketer

Personal information
- Full name: Frank William Powell Dredge
- Born: 9 February 1880; Salisbury, England
- Died: 22 August 1916 (aged 36); Thiepval, France

Domestic team information
- Years: Team
- 1905/06: Wellington
- Source: Cricinfo, 24 October 2020

Frank Dredge (9 February 1880 – 22 August 1916) was a New Zealand cricketer. He played in one first-class match for Wellington in 1905/06.

Dredge was born in England, and moved to Australia before spending some years in Wellington, where he played senior club cricket. He returned to England in 1914 and joined the Wiltshire Regiment during World War I. He was killed in action during the Battle of the Somme.

== See also ==
- List of Wellington representative cricketers
- List of cricketers who were killed during military service
