= Harry Blacklidge =

English cricketer

Personal information
- Full name: Henry George Blacklidge
- Born: 14 July 1884; Stoughton, Surrey
- Died: 23 May 1917 (aged 32); Amarah, Mesopotamia
- Batting: Left-handed
- Bowling: Left-arm fast-medium; Slow left arm orthodox
- Role: All-rounder

Domestic team information
- Years: Team
- 1908–1913: Surrey
- Source: Cricinfo, 12 March 2017

Henry George Blacklidge (14 July 1884 – 23 May 1917) was an English cricketer. He played seven first-class matches for Surrey County Cricket Club between 1908 and 1913.

In 1914, Derbyshire signed him up as a coach with the intention to play him when he qualified. During World War I, Blacklidge was a staff sergeant on the army gymnastic staff. He died from dysentery while serving in Amarah, Mesopotamia.

== See also ==
- List of cricketers who were killed during military service
