= Vivian Chiodetti =

Indian cricketer (1903–1942)

Personal information
- Full name: Vivian Alexander Chiodetti
- Born: 31 May 1903; Rawalpindi, India
- Died: 17 January 1942 (aged 38); Kyaumedaung, Burma
- Source: Cricinfo, 17 April 2016

Vivian Chiodetti (31 May 1903 – 17 January 1942) was an Indian cricketer. He played one first-class match for Hyderabad in 1931/32. He was killed in action in Burma during World War II.

== See also ==
- List of Hyderabad cricketers
- List of cricketers who were killed during military service
