= Leslie Davidson =

Scottish cricketer and British Army officer

Leslie Davidson CB JP
Personal information
- Full name: William Leslie Davidson
- Born: 31 January 1850; Inchmarlo, Kincardineshire, Scotland
- Died: 3 August 1915 (aged 65); Rouen, Normandy, France
- Batting: Right-handed

Domestic team information
- Years: Team
- 1877: Marylebone Cricket Club

Career statistics
Competition	First-class
Matches	1
Runs scored	0
Batting average	0.00
100s/50s	–/–
Top score	0
Catches/stumpings	–/–
- Source: Cricinfo, 23 March 2021

Colonel William Leslie Davidson CB JP (31 January 1850 – 3 August 1915) was a Scottish first-class cricketer and British Army officer. After being commissioned into the Royal Horse Artillery in 1869, Davidson's military career consisted of service in Africa during the Anglo-Zulu War and Second Boer War, and the subcontinent during the Second Anglo-Afghan War. He retired from the military in 1907 with the rank of colonel, but returned to the service at the outbreak for the First World War, after which he commanded a base depot in France. He was the oldest first-class cricketer to be killed in the First World War.

== Early life and military career ==
Davidson was born at Inchmarlo in Kincardineshire on 31 January 1850. His father was Patrick Davidson, a professor of civil law, while his mother was Mary Anne Leslie, daughter of William Leslie, 10th Laird of Warthill. Deciding upon on a career in the British Army, he attended the Royal Military Academy, Woolwich. Davidson graduated top of his year in July 1869, and was commissioned into the Royal Horse Artillery as a lieutenant. Davidson was first posted to British India in 1874 and was appointed aide-de-camp to Lord Napier in November of the following year. Returning to Britain, he played in a first-class cricket match in 1877 for the Marylebone Cricket Club (MCC) against Cambridge University at Fenner's. Batting once in the match, he was dismissed without scoring by Henry Luddington. Described by Wisden as a "a fine, free hitter", prior to his appearance for the MCC he had played minor matches for Northamptonshire, five years prior to the formation of the county club. He also represented the Royal Artillery in cricket, football, rackets and billiards.

== Later military career ==
Davidson later saw action in South Africa in the Anglo-Zulu War of 1879, during which he was wounded in the final battle of the war at Ulundi. He was promoted to captain in January 1880, and in the same year he fought in the second phase of the Second Anglo-Afghan War. Lord Napier was appointed Governor of Gibraltar in 1876, with Davidson once again becoming his aide-de-camp from December 1881 to December 1882. Following this he returned to service in British India, where he was promoted to major and was seconded to the Indian Ordnance Department. Further promotions in the Royal Horse Artillery followed in January 1896, when he was promoted to lieutenant colonel, and colonel in January 1900. This coincided with his appointment to the staff of the Royal Artillery in South Africa during the Second Boer War. He commanded the Royal Horse Artillery on their march to relieve Kimberley, and was present at several other engagements, including the Battles of Paardeberg, Poplar Grove, and Driefontein. Davidson was mentioned in dispatches for distinguished actions during the war. He vacated his position on the staff in January 1901, and was placed on the half-pay list, but returned to the staff in October of the same year. For his service in the war, he was decorated with the Queen's Medal, with four clasps. In April 1901, he was made a Companion to the Order of the Bath. Following the war, he returned to Britain where he was Colonel of the Staff commanding the Royal Artillery, North-Eastern District, before vacating the post and being placed on the half-pay list in October 1904. Three years later, in January 1907, he retired from the army.

== Later life and WWI ==
Davidson was appointed to be a Gentleman Usher to George V in September 1913, following the death of Sir John Ramsay Slade. When the First World War began in July 1914, Davidson came out of retirement to volunteer to serve in the conflict. He was sent to France to command No. 4 General Base Depot at Rouen. While commanding the depot on 3 August 1915, he suffered a fatal heart attack attributed to "over-exertion". He was the oldest first-class cricketer to die in the war, and one of the oldest British military casualties; though at 67 and 74 respectively, Henry Webber and Robert Robertson were older. Davidson's body was not repatriated, instead he was buried with full military honours at St Sever Cemetery in Rouen.

== Family ==
In 1887, Davidson married the Catholic Lady Theodora Keppel, daughter of William Keppel, 7th Earl of Albemarle. Their marriage necessitated his conversion to Catholicism. The couple would have six children: four daughters and two sons, Donald and Colin. Both sons would be killed in action, Donald in the First World War and Colin in the Second World War.
