= Donald Johnston (cricketer) =

English cricketer and British Army officer

Personal information
- Full name: Donald Clark Johnston
- Born: 2 December 1894; Shanghai, China
- Died: 13 September 1918 (aged 23); Beugneux, Aisne, France
- Batting: Unknown
- Bowling: Unknown

Domestic team information
- Years: Team
- 1914: Oxford University

Career statistics
Competition	First-class
Matches	2
Runs scored	6
Batting average	6.00
100s/50s	–/–
Top score	6
Balls bowled	174
Wickets	2
Bowling average	35.50
5 wickets in innings	–
10 wickets in match	–
Best bowling	2/27
Catches/stumpings	2/–
- Source: Cricinfo, 16 January 2020

Donald Clark Johnston (2 December 1894 – 13 September 1918) was an English first-class cricketer and British Army officer.

The son of John and Frances Johnston, he was born in Shanghai in December 1894. He was educated at Malvern College, before going up to Brasenose College, Oxford. While studying at Oxford, Johnston played first-class cricket for Oxford University in 1914, making two appearances against G. J. V. Weigall's XI at Oxford and L. G. Robinson's XI at Attleborough.

Johnston served in the British Army during the First World War, being commissioned as a temporary second lieutenant in the Cameronians (Scottish Rifles) in October 1914. By October 1917, he was a temporary captain, a rank which he relinquished having ceased to command a battalion. He was again made an acting captain in January 1918, before relinquishing the rank once more in July 1918. He had been promoted to the full rank of lieutenant the previous month. Johnston was seriously wounded during an assault on Hill 158 on 30 July 1918 as part of the Second Battle of the Marne. He died of his wounds on 13 September 1918 at Beugneux in France.
