= Norman McMillan =

New Zealand cricketer

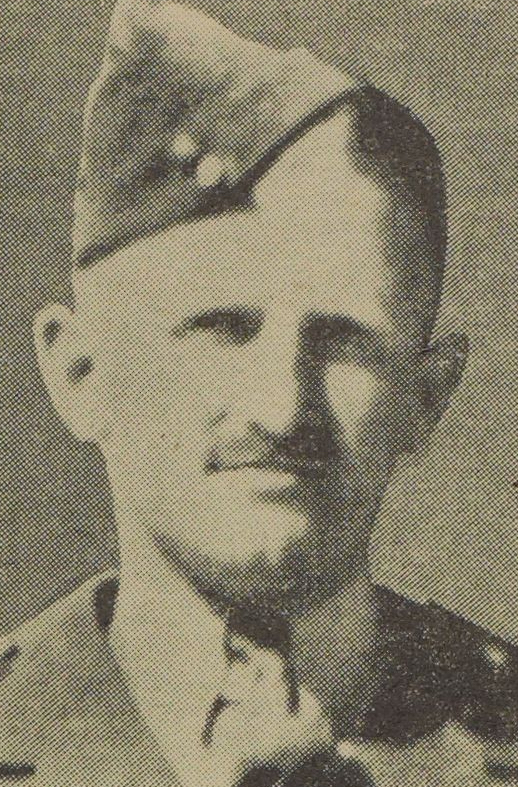

Personal information
- Full name: Norman Henry McMillan
- Born: 2 September 1906; Timaru, New Zealand
- Died: 16 July 1942 (aged 35); El Alamein, Egypt
- Source: Cricinfo, 17 June 2016

Norman Henry McMillan (2 September 1906 – 16 July 1942) was a New Zealand cricketer. He played one first-class match for the Auckland cricket team in 1931/32. He was killed in action during the First Battle of El Alamein in World War II.

== See also ==
- List of Auckland representative cricketers
- List of cricketers who were killed during military service
