= Geoffrey Davies (cricketer) =

English cricketer

Personal information
- Full name: Geoffrey Boisselier Davies
- Born: 26 October 1892; Poplar, London, England
- Died: 26 September 1915 (aged 22); Hulluch, France
- Batting: Right-handed
- Role: Bowler

Domestic team information
- Years: Team
- 1912–1914: Essex

Career statistics
Competition	FC
Matches	54
Runs scored	1487
Batting average	18.35
100s/50s	2/-
Top score	118
Balls bowled
Wickets	141
Bowling average	20.81
5 wickets in innings	4
10 wickets in match	1
Best bowling	8/67
Catches/stumpings	43/0
- Source: Cricinfo, 22 July 2013

Geoffrey Boisselier Davies (26 October 1892 – 26 September 1915) was an English cricketer.

Davies was educated at Rossall School where he played cricket for the school 1909–12, being captain in 1912. He also played for Essex in 1912. He went up to Selwyn College, Cambridge, and played for both Cambridge University and Essex in 1913 and 1914. In the First World War he was commissioned in the Essex Regiment and held the rank of Captain when he was killed in France in 1915.

== See also ==
- List of cricketers who were killed during military service
