= Joseph Williams (English cricketer) =

English cricketer (1892–1916)

Personal information
- Full name: Joseph Williams
- Born: 1892; Bromborough Pool, Cheshire, England
- Died: 10 July 1916 (aged 23-24); Thiepval, France
- Batting: Left-handed

Domestic team information
- Years: Team
- 1909–1914: Cheshire (minor counties matches)
- 1914: Marylebone Cricket Club

Career statistics
Competition	FC
Matches	1
Runs scored	19
Batting average	19.00
100s/50s	0/0
Top score	11*
Balls bowled	18
Wickets	0
Bowling average	n/a
5 wickets in innings	0
10 wickets in match	0
Best bowling	0/26
Catches/stumpings	0/-
- Source: CricketArchive, 5 June 2013

Joseph Williams (1892 – 10 July 1916) was an English cricketer who played a single first-class match for the Marylebone Cricket Club (MCC) during the 1914 season. From Bromborough Pool, Cheshire, Williams began with the Bromborough Pool Cricket Club, and later played two seasons in the Liverpool and District league, taking "nearly 200 wickets". He went on to play for Cheshire in the Minor Counties Championship, debuting during the 1909 season. He began as a top-order batsman, but later often played as an opening or first-change bowler.

Beginning with the 1912 season, Williams, working as a groundsman at Lord's, also turned out for the MCC in several non-first-class matches. His only match at first-class level came in May 1914, against Kent. In the match, he scored 11 not out in the MCC's first innings, which included a partnership of 39 runs for the ninth wicket with former Test player Jack Hearne. While bowling, he conceded 26 runs from his three overs, and the MCC lost by an innings and 19 runs. In the First World War, Williams served as a private in the 10th Battalion of the Cheshire Regiment. He was killed in Thiepval, France, in July 1916, as part of the ongoing Battle of the Somme. His name is inscribed on the Thiepval Memorial.

== See also ==
- List of cricketers who were killed during military service
