= William Eltham =

Australian cricketer

Personal information
- Full name: William Keith Eltham
- Born: 11 October 1886; Hobart, Tasmania, Australia
- Died: 31 December 1916 (aged 30); Lesboeuts, France

Domestic team information
- Years: Team
- 1909-1914: Tasmania
- Source: Cricinfo, 19 January 2016

William Keith Eltham (11 October 1886 – 31 December 1916) was an Australian cricketer. He played eleven first-class matches for Tasmania between 1909 and 1914. He was killed in action during World War I.

== See also ==
- List of Tasmanian representative cricketers
- List of cricketers who were killed during military service
