= Alan Pearsall =

Australian rules footballer and cricketer

- Born: Alan Louden Pearsall; 21 May 1915; Hobart, Tasmania
- Died: 8 March 1944 (aged 28); English Channel, off Calais, German-occupied France
- Cricket career

Cricket information
- Batting: Right-handed
- Bowling: Right-arm medium

Domestic team information
- Years: Team
- 1933/34–1938/39: Tasmania

Career statistics
Competition	First-class
Matches	7
Runs scored	300
Batting average	23.07
100s/50s	0/1
Top score	56
Balls bowled	472
Wickets	6
Bowling average	57.50
5 wickets in innings	0
10 wickets in match	0
Best bowling	2/64
Catches/stumpings	2/–
- Source: CricketArchive, 31 December 2014
Australian rules football career
Personal information
- Position: Defender
Playing career^{1}
Years	Club	Games (Goals)
1933–40	Lefroy (Tas)	
1941	South Melbourne	2 (0)
- ^{1} Playing statistics correct to the end of 1941.

Alan Louden Pearsall (21 May 1915 – 8 March 1944) was an Australian sportsman who played first-class cricket for Tasmania and Australian rules football in the Victorian Football League (VFL) with South Melbourne.

== Family ==
The son of Benjamin James Pearsall (1880-1951), and Olive Mabel Pearsall, née Marsden, Alan Louden Pearsall was born at the Edinburgh Hospital, MacQuarie Street, Hobart, Tasmania on 21 May 1915.

He married Dorothy Eva Bumford on 15 March 1941.

== Education ==
He was educated at the Hobart High School.

== Cricket ==
Pearsall made seven first-class appearances for Tasmania during the 1930s, scoring a total of 300 runs at 23.07 and taking 6 wickets.

He made his debut in a match against an Australian XI team and dismissed Bill Brown for 96. Ian Johnson and Keith Miller are other Test players whose wicket he took in his career.

He opened the batting against Victoria at Launceston in 1935/36 and made the only half century of his career, an innings of 56.

== Football ==
Pearsall played football for Lefroy in Tasmania from 1933 until 1940.

When Pearsall moved to Victoria to do his pilot training he joined South Melbourne and played two VFL games for the club in 1941.

== Military service ==
In World War II, Pearsall served as a Flying Officer with the RAAF.

== Death ==
He died, on active service, on 8 March 1944, when his plane came down into the English Channel.

"Alan Pearsall enlisted in the RAAF when war broke out and trained as a pilot. He was transferred to the RAF and took part in the Battle of Britain as a fighter pilot. On the 8th March 1944 he was returning from a photographic sortie north-east of Calais, France when he radioed to say that his engine on his Hurricane had failed.
On instruction he bailed out over the English Channel at around 2000 feet. Aircraft were immediately despatched to search, but no accurate fix was obtained on Pearsall’s position. Air Sea Rescue was delayed due to gale force winds, and although a search continued for two days no trace of Pearsall or his plane was ever found."

== See also ==
- List of Victorian Football League players who died on active service
- List of cricketers who were killed during military service
