= Walter Malcolm =

New Zealand cricketer (1893–1917)

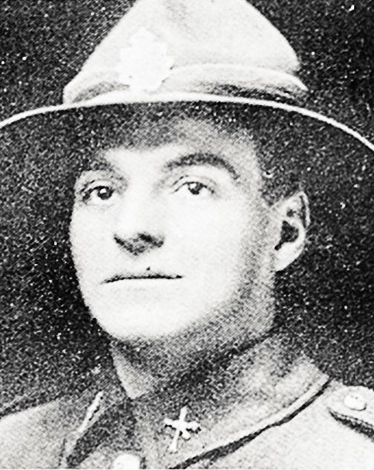

Personal information
- Born: 25 December 1893; Blenheim, Marlborough, New Zealand
- Died: 23 December 1917 (aged 23); Ypres, Belgium
- Batting: Right-handed

Domestic team information
- Years: Team
- 1914/15: Otago
- Only FC: 17 February 1915 Otago v Southland
- Source: Cricinfo, 16 May 2016

Walter Malcolm (25 December 1893 – 23 December 1917) was a New Zealand cricketer. He played one first-class match for Otago during the 1914–15 season. He was killed in action during World War I.

Malcolm was born at Blenheim in the Marlborough District of New Zealand in 1893, the son of James and Emily Malcolm. He had family in Dunedin and moved to the city where he worked as a maltster for Wilson's Malt Extract Company. His grandfather, James Malcolm, was one of the early settlers of the city and was a Commodore for the Union Steamship Company. He married Ethel Jeffs in Dunedin in December 1915.

A club cricketer for The Grange club in Dunedin, Malcolm showed "promise" as a teenager. During the 1911–12 season he headed the team's batting averages despite being the youngest member of the side at only 16, drawing praise in the Dunedin press.

After playing for the Otago junior side as early as 1910–11, Malcolm played his only first-class match in February 1915. Playing against Southland at Rugby Park in Invercargill, he scored a toal of 18 runs in the match, including 16 in Otago's second innings. He led the Grange Club batting averages again in 1916–17, and was considered by some as "the most promising batsman in Otago", but with World War I intervening the chances for him to play representative cricket for the provincial side were limited As well as cricket, Malcolm also played rugby union for the Union Football Club in Dunedin.

After initially serving on the home front in the Signal Corps, Malcolm enlisted in the 3rd battalion of the Otago Infantry Regiment in February 1917. He arrived at Plymouth in September and was in France by the end of October, initially at Étaples. He arrived at the front on 15 December and was serving as a private when he was killed in action near Ypres on 23 December. He was aged 23. Malcolm is buried at Poelcapelle British Cemetery in Belgium. His son, who was named Walter, was born in January 1918 at Dunedin. His wife later remarried.

== See also ==
- List of cricketers who were killed during military service
