= Frank Thorn (cricketer) =

Australian cricketer

Personal information
- Full name: Frank Leslie Oliver Thorn
- Born: 16 August 1912; St Arnaud, Victoria, Australia
- Died: 11 February 1942 (aged 29); Gasmata, New Britain, Territory of New Guinea
- Batting: Right-handed
- Bowling: Right-arm medium-pace
- Role: Bowler

Domestic team information
- Years: Team
- 1937–1939: Victoria

Career statistics
Competition	First-class
Matches	7
Runs scored	48
Batting average	6.85
100s/50s	0/0
Top score	30
Balls bowled	1377
Wickets	24
Bowling average	26.83
5 wickets in innings	2
10 wickets in match	1
Best bowling	5/74
Catches/stumpings	1/0
- Source: Cricinfo, 17 December 2019

Frank Leslie Oliver Thorn (16 August 1912 – 11 February 1942) was an Australian cricketer. He played seven first-class cricket matches for Victoria between 1937 and 1939.

Thorn was a medium-paced bowler who dismissed Don Bradman for five in the Sheffield Shield when Bradman was aiming to hit a world-record seventh consecutive first-class century in 1938–39. He had taken 5 for 111 and 5 for 74 against Tasmania earlier in the same season.

Thorn joined the Royal Australian Air Force in February 1941. He was a member of a bomber's crew that crashed during a mission to bomb Japanese destroyers at Gasmata harbour in New Britain in February 1942. The plane's wreckage was not found for more than 60 years.

== See also ==
- List of cricketers who were killed during military service
