= James Bryden =

New Zealand cricketer

Jim Bryden
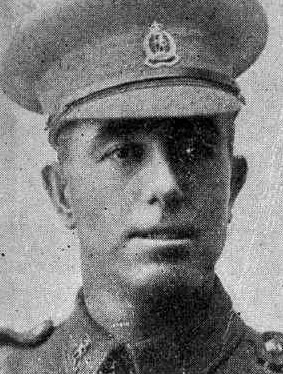
- Bryden in uniform during World War I

Personal information
- Full name: Thomas James Bryden
- Born: 1 June 1877; Invercargill, Southland, New Zealand
- Died: 12 October 1917 (aged 40); Bellevue, Passchendaele salient, near Ypres, Belgium
- Role: Bowler

Domestic team information
- Years: Team
- 1912/13–1913/14: Otago
- Source: ESPNcricinfo, 6 May 2016

Thomas James Bryden (1 June 1877 – 12 October 1917) was a New Zealand cricketer. He played two first-class matches for Otago, one in each of the 1912–13 and 1913–14 seasons. He was killed in action during World War I at the First Battle of Passchendaele.

== Early life ==
Born at Invercargill in 1877, the oldest son of Thomas and Barbara Bryden and of Scottish descent, Bryden attended the Middle and North schools in the city before training as a cabinetmaker at William Smith and Co. As well as cricket, he played rugby union whilst living in Invercargill, representing Brittania FC as a "clever half-back". He later moved to Dunedin where he worked for Nees and Co as a chairmaker.

== Cricket ==
Known as James or Jim Bryden, he was a well known club cricketer in Dunedin who played for Grange Cricket Club before moving to play for Dunedin Cricket Club, attracted by the team's better quality wicket. He captained the Dunedin team for three seasons and was described as "a vigorous type of batsman" whose method was "to go for the bowling as soon as he got his eye in". He was considered "unassuming" and "conscientious", was "always willing to help a young cricketer" and was a popular and respected cricketer as far away as Wairarapa.

After playing for Otago in the annual match against Southland in March 1913, Bryden made his debut for the representative team―aged 35―later the same month in Otago's only Plunket Shield match of the season, a fixture against Canterbury at Lancaster Park, Christchurch. He scored 15 runs on Otago's first innings and 14 in their second as the team lost by an innings. The following season he played in the second of Otago's two matches against Canterbury, appearing as a full substitute for the Otago captain Harry Siedeberg after he dislocated a finger early in the match whilst fielding. Bryden scored two ducks as Canterbury again won by an innings.

== Military service and death ==
Bryden volunteered for active service during World War I. Initially he was rejected as unfit, but was later drafted as a rifleman in the New Zealand Army in January 1917. He was part of the 25th Reinforcement group sent to Europe, disembarking at Plymouth in July before moving to Sling Camp. He was initially deemed unfit for front line service, before being passed fit and leaving for France, arriving at Étaples in early September, and joining the 4th battalion of the 3rd Rifle Brigade, part of the New Zealand Division, at the front a week later. He died at Bellevue near Ypres in Belgium in October 1917 aged 40. His body was never recovered and his name appears on the Tyne Cot Memorial. Bryden never married. He was survived by one brother and seven sisters.

== See also ==
- List of cricketers who were killed during military service
