= Robert Philpot-Brookes =

English cricketer and soldier

Personal information
- Full name: Robert Francis Hugh Philpot-Brookes
- Born: 11 August 1912; Fulham, London, England
- Died: 28 May 1940 (aged 27); Mont-Saint-Éloi, Nord, France
- Batting: Right-handed

Domestic team information
- Years: Team
- 1938/39: Europeans (India)

Career statistics
Competition	First-class
Matches	2
Runs scored	185
Batting average	46.25
100s/50s	1/0
Top score	17
Catches/stumpings	2/–
- Source: Cricinfo, 26 April 2020

Captain Robert Francis Hugh Philpot-Brookes (11 August 1912 – 28 May 1940) was a first-class cricketer and British Army officer. Born in Fulham in 1912, he was educated at King's College School in Wimbledon, joining the cricket team there.

Joining the British Army, Philpot-Brookes was commissioned as an officer in the 1st Battalion, Northamptonshire Regiment and was posted to British India Whilst serving there, he took part in two first-class cricket matches representing Europeans, scoring a century during the former. In 1935, Philpot-Brookes also represented Punjab.

In 1940, Philpot-Brookes, who had transferred to the 2nd Battalion, traveled to France to be part of the British Expeditionary Force (BEF). During the German invasion, Captain Philpot-Brookes was killed during the Battle of Dunkirk in a rearguard action at Mont-Saint-Éloi. He was buried at Bus House Cemetery.

== See also ==
- List of cricketers who were killed during military service
