= Alan Wallace =

New Zealand cricketer (1891–1915)

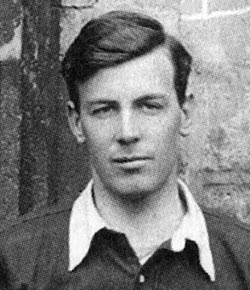

Personal information
- Born: 1 April 1891; Devonport, Auckland, New Zealand
- Died: 10 May 1915 (aged 24) at sea, off Gallipoli, Ottoman Turkey

Domestic team information
- Years: Team
- 1910/11–1911/12: Auckland

Career statistics
Competition	First-class
Matches	3
Runs scored	102
Batting average	25.50
100s/50s	0/1
Top score	72
Balls bowled	36
Wickets	0
Bowling average	–
5 wickets in innings	–
10 wickets in match	–
Best bowling	–
Catches/stumpings	2/0
- Source: Cricinfo, 19 January 2018

Alan Wallace (1 April 1891 – 10 May 1915) was a gifted New Zealand scholar and sportsman. He was killed in action during World War I.

Wallace was born in the Auckland suburb of Devonport in 1891. His parents were George and Florence Wallace. His father worked at Devonport Gas Works and he grew up on Lake Road in that suburb. He attended Auckland Grammar School from 1903 and excelled academically in mathematics, science, and languages. In sport, his main discipline was cricket. His headmaster, James Tibbs, described him as "a lad endowed in no ordinary degree with moral and intellectual force". He won a large number of scholarships and in the junior university scholarship, which he gained when he entered Auckland University College, he came second in the country. He graduated with a Master of Arts in 1912 and gained a Rhodes Scholarship, which enabled him to study mathematics at Balliol College, Oxford. Aged 20 when he became a Rhodes Scholar, he was then the youngest scholar from New Zealand.

Wallace played three first-class matches for Auckland between 1910 and 1912. Other sports that he competed in were association football, swimming, rowing, and shooting.

Wallace was still at Balliol College when World War I started. He enlisted on 24 September 1914 and he was assigned to the British Section of the New Zealand Expeditionary Force. By Christmas of that year, he had arrived in Egypt. He arrived at Gallipoli on 25 April 1915. For his part of rescuing injured soldiers on 2 and 3 May, he was recommended for the Distinguished Conduct Medal. On 9 May, while discussing plans with Major Hugh Quinn, Wallace was shot in the head by a sniper. He died the following day and was buried at sea.

== See also ==
- List of cricketers who were killed during military service
