= Charles Backman =

Australian cricketer

Personal information
- Full name: Charles James Backman
- Born: 14 April 1884; Adelaide, South Australia
- Died: 25 April 1915 (aged 31); Anzac Cove, Gallipoli, Ottoman Turkey
- Batting: Right-handed
- Bowling: Right-arm medium

Domestic team information
- Years: Team
- 1911/12: South Australia

Career statistics
Competition	First-class
Matches	1
Runs scored	16
Batting average	8.00
100s/50s	0/0
Top score	16
Balls bowled	96
Wickets	3
Bowling average	17.66
5 wickets in innings	0
10 wickets in match	0
Best bowling	3/53
Catches/stumpings	1/–
- Source: Cricinfo, 11 April 2018

Charles James "Rappie" Backman (14 April 1884 – 25 April 1915) was an Australian cricketer. He played in one first-class match for South Australia in the 1911–12 Sheffield Shield season. He was killed during the Gallipoli Campaign and was the first Australian cricketer who played in the Sheffield Shield to be killed in World War I.

== Family ==
One of the nine children of Kaspar Swanton Charles Maclean Bachman (1848-1920), and Mary Anne Backman (1853-1935), née Reid, Charles James Bachman (known as Backman), was born in Adelaide, South Australia on 14 April 1884.

One of his brothers, Edward John Backman (1890-1935), and one of his brothers-in-law, Arthur John Benton (-1917), also served in the First AIF.

== Military service ==
Employed as a boilermaker, Backman enlisted in the First AIF on 19 August 1914, served overseas and, as a member of the 10th Australian Infantry Battalion, he took part in the landing at Anzac Cove, Gallipoli, in Turkey on Sunday, 25 April 1915.

== Death ==
He was killed in action at Anzac Cove, Gallipoli, Ottoman Turkey, somewhere between 25 April 1915 and 29 April 1915.

== See also ==
- List of South Australian representative cricketers
- List of cricketers who were killed during military service
