= James Alexander (cricketer) =

English cricketer (1916–1943)

Personal information
- Born: 3 September 1916; Tonbridge, Kent, England
- Died: 23 October 1943 (aged 27); Bhawanipur, Bengal, British India
- Source: ESPNcricinfo, 24 March 2016

James Alexander (3 September 1916 – 23 October 1943) was an English cricketer. He played two first-class matches for Bengal between 1936 and 1938. He was killed in action during World War II.

== See also ==
- List of Bengal cricketers
- List of cricketers who were killed during military service
