= Henry Walters (cricketer) =

New Zealand cricketer

Henry George Walters (6 November 1917 – 25 August 1944) was a New Zealand cricketer. He was a left-handed batsman who played for Auckland. He was born in Auckland and died during World War II in the English Channel when serving as a Flight Sergeant with the Royal New Zealand Air Force.

Walters made a single first-class appearance for the team, during the 1941–42 season, against Wellington. From the opening order, he scored 81 runs in the first innings in which he batted, and 39 runs in the second, as Auckland won the match by a comfortable margin.

== See also ==
- List of Auckland representative cricketers
- List of cricketers who were killed during military service
