= Alastair Monteath =

New Zealand cricketer

Personal information
- Full name: Alastair Patrick Johnstone Monteath
- Born: 12 September 1913; Christchurch, New Zealand
- Died: 27 June 1942 (aged 28); Western Desert, Italian Libya

Domestic team information
- Years: Team
- 1939/40: Otago
- Source: Cricinfo, 17 May 2016

Alastair Patrick Johnstone Monteath (12 September 1913 – 27 June 1942) was a New Zealand cricketer. He played two first-class matches for Otago during the 1939–40 season. He was killed in action during World War II.

Monteath was born at Christchurch in 1913 and educated at Christ's College in the city. He was working as a salesman in Dunedin when he enrolled in the New Zealand Army. He was serving in 20 Battalion in North Africa when he was killed in June 1942 in Italian Libya during the Western Desert campaign. He is commemorated on the Alamein Memorial in Egypt.

== See also ==
- List of cricketers who were killed during military service
