= Edwin Myers (sportsman) =

English sportsman

Personal information
- Born: 5 July 1888; Blackheath, England
- Died: 15 September 1916 (aged 28); Somme, France
- Source: Cricinfo, 13 March 2017

Edwin Myers (5 July 1888 – 15 September 1916) was an English sportsman. He played eleven first-class cricket matches for Surrey between 1910 and 1914. He also played football for Northfleet and Crystal Palace. He was killed in action during World War I when serving as a corporal in the 21st Battalion (Surrey Rifles) of the London Regiment, on the opening day of the Battle of Flers–Courcelette.

== See also ==
- List of Surrey County Cricket Club players
- List of cricketers who were killed during military service
