= Albert Pratt (cricketer) =

New Zealand cricketer

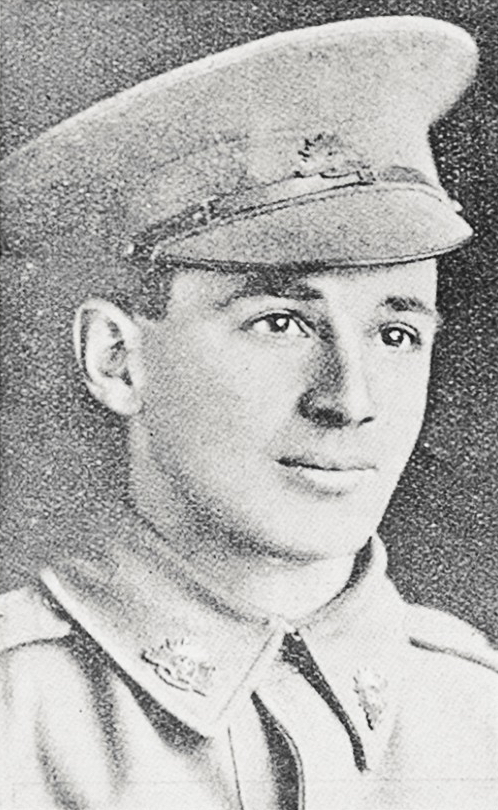

Personal information
- Full name: Albert Ernest Pratt
- Born: 16 April 1893; Auckland, New Zealand
- Died: 19 July 1916 (aged 23); Fromelles, Nord, France
- Source: Cricinfo, 19 June 2016

Albert Ernest Pratt (16 April 1893 – 19 July 1916) was a New Zealand cricketer. He played one first-class match for Auckland in 1912/13. He was killed in action during World War I.

== See also ==
- List of Auckland representative cricketers
- List of cricketers who were killed during military service
