= HMS Warwick =

Five ships of the Royal Navy have borne the name Warwick, named after the English town of Warwick:

- English ship Warwick (1643) was a 22-gun ship, formerly a privateer. She was captured in 1643, renamed HMS Old Warwick in 1650 and was broken up in 1660.
- HMS Warwick (1696) was a 48-gun fourth rate launched in 1696. She was rebuilt in 1710 and was broken up in 1726.
- HMS Warwick (1733) was a 60-gun fourth rate launched in 1733. She was captured by the French ship L'Atlante in 1756, was recaptured in 1761 by HMS Minerva and broken up.
- HMS Warwick (1767) was a 50-gun fourth rate launched in 1767, converted to a receiving ship in 1783 and sold in 1802.
- HMS Warwick (D25) was a W-class destroyer launched in 1917. She was converted into an escort destroyer in 1943 and was sunk in 1944.

== See also ==
- Constant Warwick
