= George Fenton (cricketer) =

English cricketer and British Indian Army officer

Personal information
- Full name: George Geoffrey James Fenton
- Born: 2 July 1909; Derby, Derbyshire, England
- Died: 26 May 1944 (aged 34); Palena, Abruzzo, Italy
- Batting: Unknown

Career statistics
Competition	First-class
Matches	1
Runs scored	52
Batting average	–
100s/50s	–/–
Top score	41*
Catches/stumpings	–/–
- Source: ESPNcricinfo, 17 December 2021

George Geoffrey James Fenton (2 July 1909 – 26 May 1944) was an English first-class cricketer and British Army officer.

The son of Lieutenant Colonel George Cecil Verner Fenton, he was born at Derby in July 1909. After completing his education, he went up to the Royal Military Academy, Woolwich. He graduated from Sandhurst into the Royal Artillery as a second lieutenant in January 1930, with promotion to lieutenant following in January 1933. While serving in British India, he made a single appearance in first-class cricket for Viceroy's XI against the Roshanara Club at Delhi in February 1933. He batted twice in the match, ending both of the Viceroy's XI innings' unbeaten with scores of 11 and 41. In the Royal Artillery, he was promoted to captain in August 1938 and was made an adjutant in June 1939. In January 1939, Fenton married in the Hampshire village of Milford on Sea. Fenton served in the Second World War, during which he was given command of the 85th Mountain Battery in 1944 during the Italian campaign. He was killed in action on 26 May 1944 while the 85th was in the midst of attacking the German fortifications of the Gustav Line near the Sangro River at Palena. Fenton was buried at the Sangro River War Cemetery.
