= William Welch (cricketer, born 1911) =

Australian-born English cricketer and British Army officer

Personal information
- Full name: William Mark Welch
- Born: 12 August 1911; Brisbane, Queensland, Australia
- Died: 25 May 1940 (aged 28); Calais, Pas-de-Calais, France
- Batting: Right-handed
- Bowling: Right-arm off break Right-arm medium

Career statistics
Competition	First-class
Matches	4
Runs scored	170
Batting average	34.00
100s/50s	1/–
Top score	104
Balls bowled	476
Wickets	8
Bowling average	27.62
5 wickets in innings	1
10 wickets in match	–
Best bowling	5/43
Catches/stumpings	1/–
- Source: Cricinfo, 2 June 2019

William Mark Welch (12 August 1911 – 25 May 1940) was an Australian first-class cricketer and British Army officer. He played first-class cricket on four occasions for the Free Foresters, before serving in the Second World War, during which he was killed in action at the Siege of Calais in May 1940.

== Life and military service ==
The son of William Alfred Welch and Jessie Isabella Welch (née Mark), he was born at Brisbane. He was sent to England to be educated, where he attended Harrow School. While at Harrow he was a cadet and after leaving he was commissioned as a second lieutenant in the Artists Rifles in May 1933. He made his debut in first-class cricket for the Free Foresters against Cambridge University at Fenner's in 1935. On debut he took figures of 5 for 43 in the Cambridge first-innings. He made three further first-class appearances for the Free Foresters, all against Cambridge University in 1936, 1937 and 1939. He scored a total of 170 runs across his four matches, at an average of 34.00. He made one century score, making 104 in the 1939 fixture. With his right-arm off break and medium pace bowling, he took 8 wickets at a bowling average of 27.62.

He was promoted to the rank of lieutenant while still serving in the Artists Rifles in May 1936, He served during the Second World War, having been transferred to the Rifle Brigade. He was sent to France during the German invasion to aid in the defence of Calais and Dunkirk. Disembarking from the SS Archangel at Dunkirk, he quickly found himself in action. Faced with the advance of the 10th Panzer Division, The Rifles retreated behind the old walls of Calais and were besieged. Welch was killed in action on 25 May 1940, while attempting to retake a bridge captured by the advancing Germans. His body was recovered and was buried at the Calais Southern Cemetery.
