= William Stuart (cricketer, born 1889) =

Scottish cricketer and British Army officer

Personal information
- Full name: William Grant Spruell Stuart
- Born: 8 June 1889; Gartly, Aberdeenshire, Scotland
- Died: 23 April 1917 (aged 27); Guémappe, Pas-de-Calais, France
- Batting: Right-handed

Domestic team information
- Years: Team
- 1914: Scotland

Career statistics
Competition	First-class
Matches	1
Runs scored	27
Batting average	13.50
100s/50s	–/–
Top score	17
Catches/stumpings	2/–
- Source: Cricinfo, 29 March 2021

Captain William Grant Spruell Stuart MC (8 June 1889 – 23 April 1917) was a Scottish first-class cricketer and British Army officer.

== Career ==
The son of the South African The Reverend W. Stuart, he was born in June 1889 at Gartly, Aberdeenshire. He was educated at George Watson's College, before going up to the University of Edinburgh to read classics. A member of the Watsonian Cricket Club, Stuart also played his club cricket for East and West of Scotland. He was selected to play for Scotland in a first-class match against Ireland at Dublin in 1914. He batted twice in the match and was dismissed for scores of 17 and 10 by Bob Lambert and Gus Kelly respectively.

Stuart volunteered for the British Army during the First World War, being commissioned as a second lieutenant in the Queen's Own Cameron Highlanders in September 1914, with promotion to lieutenant following in April 1915. He was promoted to captain in December 1916 and was awarded the Military Cross in the 1917 New Year Honours. Stuart served with his regiment's 7th (Service) Battalion and was killed in action while attempting to capture Guémappe during the Battle of Arras on 23 April 1917. He was buried at the Faubourg d'Amiens Cemetery in Arras.
