= Henry Rosher =

English cricketer

Personal information
- Full name: Henry Louis Rosher
- Born: 7 May 1866; Edmonton, Middlesex, England
- Died: 14 April 1915 (aged 48); Shaiba, Mesopotamia

Career statistics
Competition	First-class
Matches	1
Runs scored	13
Batting average	13.00
100s/50s	–/–
Top score	13
Catches/stumpings	1/0
- Source: ESPNcricinfo, 31 July 2020

Henry Louis Rosher (7 May 1866 – 14 April 1915) was an English first-class cricketer and British Army officer.

== Life and career ==
Born in Edmonton in May 1866, Rosher was educated at Tonbridge School and the Royal Military College, Sandhurst. Commissioned as a lieutenant in the Dorsetshire Regiment on 7 February 1885, Rosher was promoted to captain on 19 November 1891. Posted in Malta and Egypt, Rosher was transferred to British India in 1893, the same year he married Lillian Hall. From 1897, he was stationed in Madras as a Deputy Assistant Adjutant General under George Wolseley. He was in South Africa for service in the Second Boer War, and was promoted to major after the end of this war, on 23 August 1902, before returning to India on the SS Ionian in November 1902. Promotion to lieutenant colonel followed in 1910.

Rosher appeared in one first-class match for J. G. Greig's XI against Hindus at the Deccan Gymkhana Ground on 29 August 1912. During the match, Rosher caught C. V. Metha off the bowling of Elliot Tillard and scored 13 runs before himself being caught by Palwankar Vithal off the bowling of J. M. Rasker.

At the outbreak of the First World War in August 1914, Rosher was commanding the 2nd Battalion of the Dorsetshire Regiment, which was part of the 16th Indian Brigade stationed in Poona. The battalion was ordered to the Persian Gulf, where they landed at Fao in November 1914 as part of the Indian Expeditionary Force. During the Mesopotamian campaign, Rosher was mentioned in despatches twice, once at the fall of Basra, and again at the Battle of Shaiba. On 14 April 1915, the third day of the latter battle, Rosher was killed in action leading a bayonet charge against Ottoman forces. He is buried at the Basra War Cemetery.
