= Michael Anderson (cricketer, born 1916) =

English cricketer

Personal information
- Full name: Michael Hebert Anderson
- Born: 11 December 1916; Devonport, Devon, England
- Died: 10 May 1940 (aged 23) near Hoogvliet, Netherlands
- Batting: Right-handed
- Role: Wicket-keeper

Domestic team information
- Years: Team
- 1937: Cambridge University

Career statistics
Competition	First-class
Matches	4
Runs scored	92
Batting average	18.40
100s/50s	0/1
Top score	60
Catches/stumpings	3/3
- Source: Cricinfo, 12 August 2008

Michael Herbert Anderson (11 December 1916 – 10 May 1940) was an English cricketer who played four first-class cricket matches for Cambridge University Cricket Club and Free Foresters. His highest score of 60 came when playing for the Free Foresters in the match against the university side. He also played two Minor Counties Championship matches for Hertfordshire County Cricket Club.

== Military career and death ==
Anderson joined the Royal Air Force in 1936 and was commissioned as a Pilot Officer. He was stationed with No. 600 Squadron RAF at RAF Manston in Kent flying Bristol Blenheim as fighters. On 10 May 1940, Anderson and his air gunner, Leading Aircraftman Herbert Hawkins (but not the navigator), were assigned to a mission to bombard Waalhaven airfield near Rotterdam in the Netherlands. The six Blenheims of B Flight involved in the mission were ambushed whilst returning to base by twelve Messerschmitt Bf 110s near Spijkenisse. Hawkins shot down one of the attacking aircraft, but the attack was too much for the Blenheims. Anderson and Hawkins' aircraft was chased by a single Bf 110, and one of the engines burst due to German fire above Hoogvliet. Forced to attempt a crash landing, Anderson crashed the plane into a field near Hoogvliet. Both Anderson and Hawkins were killed in the landing, Anderson being decapitated. Anderson and Hawkins are buried in Spijkenisse Old General Cemetery.
