= Edwin Barlow (cricketer) =

English cricketer (1912–1980)

Personal information
- Full name: Edwin Alan Barlow
- Born: 24 February 1912; Ashton-under-Lyne, England
- Died: 27 June 1980 (aged 68); Gretton, England
- Batting: Right-handed
- Bowling: Right-arm medium; Right-arm off break
- Role: Bowler

Domestic team information
- Years: Team
- 1932–1934: Oxford University
- 1932: Lancashire
- FC debut: 4 May 1932 Oxford Univ. v Yorkshire
- Last FC: 9 July 1934 Oxford Univ. v Cambridge Univ.

Career statistics
Competition	First-class
Matches	36
Runs scored	582
Batting average	13.85
100s/50s	0/0
Top score	46
Balls bowled	7838
Wickets	102
Bowling average	27.38
5 wickets in innings	4
10 wickets in match	0
Best bowling	6/44
Catches/stumpings	21/–
- Source: CricketArchive, 6 May 2011

Edwin Alan Barlow (24 February 1912 – 27 June 1980) was an English cricketer. He played 36 first-class matches for Oxford University and Lancashire. Barlow also represented Denbighshire in the Minor Counties Championship.
