= Gary Bricknell =

South African cricketer

Personal information
- Full name: Gary Arthur Bricknell
- Born: 13 August 1954; Cape Town, Cape Province, South Africa
- Died: 25 March 1977 (aged 22); Keetmanshoop, South West Africa
- Batting: Right-handed
- Bowling: Slow left-arm orthodox
- Role: Bowler

Domestic team information
- Years: Team
- 1975/76–1976/77: Western Province

Career statistics
Competition	First-class
Matches	14
Runs scored	190
Batting average	19.00
100s/50s	0/0
Top score	34
Balls bowled	3,429
Wickets	58
Bowling average	21.37
5 wickets in innings	2
10 wickets in match	0
Best bowling	6/55
Catches/stumpings	6/–
- Source: CricketArchive, 16 November 2022

Gary Arthur Bricknell (13 August 1954 – 25 March 1977) was a South African first-class cricketer who played for Western Province in Section B and Section A of the Currie Cup.

A left-arm orthodox spin bowler, he spent most of his time in Section B. Twice however, in 1976/77, he was promoted to Western Province's Section A side, but struggled in the stronger competition, taking just four wickets at 52.25. He still finished the season as the equal fifth most prolific first-class wicket taker in the country, with 35 victims. In a match at the De Beers Diamond Oval against Griqualand West that season, he had statistically the best performance of his career, with innings figures of 6–55 and 2–14.

On 25 March 1977, at Keetmanshoop in South West Africa, just two weeks after his last first-class appearance, Bricknell was killed in a train crash. He had been on the train with his South African Army regiment, on his way to serve in the Border War. As of 2026, he is the last first-class cricketer to be killed on active military service.
