= Peter Bairnsfather-Cloete =

South African cricketer and South African Army officer

Personal information
- Full name: Peter Henry Bairnsfather Cloete
- Born: 5 March 1917; Cape Town, Cape Province, South Africa
- Died: 19 December 1942 (aged 25); Kisumu, Kenya Colony
- Batting: Right-handed
- Bowling: Right-arm slow

Domestic team information
- Years: Team
- 1936/37–1939/40: Western Province

Career statistics
Competition	First-class
Matches	9
Runs scored	74
Batting average	7.40
100s/50s	–/–
Top score	29
Balls bowled	1,823
Wickets	29
Bowling average	33.41
5 wickets in innings	1
10 wickets in match	–
Best bowling	5/112
Catches/stumpings	7/–
- Source: Cricinfo, 10 June 2022

Peter Henry Bairnsfather-Cloete (5 March 1917 – 19 December 1942) was a South African first-class cricketer and South African Army officer.

The son of Hugh Cloete and Nicolette Bairnsfather, he was born at Cape Town in March 1917. He was educated at the Western Province Prep, before attending the Diocesan College. Bairnsfather-Cloete made his debut in first-class cricket for Western Province against Griqualand West in December 1936 at Cape Town in the Currie Cup. He made eight further first-class appearances for Western Province to March 1940. He scored 74 runs in his nine first-class matches, at an average of 7.40. With his right-arm slow bowling, he took 29 wickets at a bowling average of 33.41; his best bowling figures of 5 for 112 came against Orange Free State in February 1937.

Aside from playing cricket, Bairnsfather-Cloete owned the luxury Alphen Hotel in Constantia, Cape Town. He served in the Second World War as a captain in the Duke of Edinburgh's Own Rifles. During the war he was attached to the headquarters of the 1st South African Division, which was taking part in the North African campaign. Bairnsfather-Cloete died on 19 December 1942 when the Lockheed Lodestar he was a passenger aboard crashed into Lake Victoria shortly after take-off from Kisumu Airport in Kenya Colony; he had been returning to South Africa from Cairo.
