= Michael Matthews (cricketer) =

English cricketer

Personal information
- Full name: Michael Harrington Matthews
- Born: 26 April 1914; Wandsworth, Surrey, England
- Died: 29 May 1940 (aged 26); HMS Greyhound, off Dunkirk, France
- Batting: Right-handed
- Role: Wicketkeeper

Domestic team information
- Years: Team
- 1934–1937: Oxford University

Career statistics
Competition	First-class
Matches	23
Runs scored	393
Batting average	13.10
100s/50s	0/1
Top score	68
Catches/stumpings	32/6
- Source: Cricinfo, 29 November 2014

Michael Harrington Matthews (26 April 1914 – 29 May 1940) was an English first-class cricketer and naval officer who died in action in World War II.

The son of Walter Matthews, who was Dean of St. Paul's Cathedral from 1934 to 1967, Michael Matthews went to Westminster School, where he played cricket for the first XI from 1930 to 1933. In his last two years at school he was selected to keep wicket for The Rest in the annual schools match at Lord's against Lord's Schools. In the 1932 match he made four stumpings and a catch when John Cameron took all 10 Lord's Schools wickets with his leg-spin.

He went up to Christ Church, Oxford, in 1933, and played a sprinkling of matches for the university team in 1934 and 1935 before establishing himself as the principal wicket-keeper in 1936 and 1937, and playing in the annual match against Cambridge University. In his last match he took six catches to help Oxford to victory over Cambridge for the first time in five years. His highest score was 68 when he top-scored in the first innings against Minor Counties in 1936.

He was awarded a first in Greats, and read for the Bar at Gray's Inn. He married Loveday Abbott shortly after the outbreak of World War II. He was serving in the Royal Naval Volunteer Reserve as a Sub-lieutenant on HMS Greyhound, the destroyer which was the first to reach Dunkirk, when he was killed in a bombing raid.
