= Alfred Kinvig =

New Zealand cricketer

Personal information
- Full name: Alfred George Kinvig
- Born: 16 March 1874; Dunedin, Otago, New Zealand
- Died: 15 February 1965 (aged 90); Christchurch, Canterbury, New Zealand
- Batting: Left-handed

Domestic team information
- Years: Team
- 1893/94–1898/99: Otago
- 1901/02–1903/04: Canterbury
- Source: ESPNcricinfo, 15 May 2016

Alfred George Kinvig (16 March 1874 – 15 February 1965) was a New Zealand cricketer and bowler. He played first-class cricket for Otago between 1893–94 and 1898–99 and for Canterbury between the 1901–02 and 1903–04 seasons, and won national recognition as a bowler.

Kinvig was born at Dunedin in 1874 and in 1893 was a founder member of Dunedin Cricket Club. Described as "a particularly accomplished cricketer" who played as an all-rounder, Kinvig made his first-class debut for Otago in February 1894, playing against Hawke's Bay in a match at Carisbrook, and played in a total of seven first-class matches for the representative team. He also played in a non-first-class match against the touring Australian side in November 1896.

After moving to Christchurch, he played another three first-class matches for Canterbury, one in each season from 1901–02 to 1903–04, and played club cricket for the Sydenham-Addington club. He began playing lawn bowls in 1916, gaining a reputation as an excellent bowler throughout New Zealand. He was described as "outstanding" and won the national pairs championship in 1929 and was the sixth player to be awarded a gold star at the Christchurch Bowls Centre. He played frequently in a pair with Henry Wilson, a former All Black who had played first-class cricket for Hawke's Bay.

Kinvig worked as a clerk. He and his wife, Emma, had four children. He died at Christchurch in 1965 aged 90.
