= Druce Brandt =

English cricketer, academic, and British Army officer

Personal information
- Full name: Druce Robert Brandt
- Born: 20 October 1887; Streatham, Surrey, England
- Died: 6 July 1915 (aged 27); Boezinge, West Flanders, Belgium
- Batting: Right-handed
- Role: Wicket-keeper

Domestic team information
- Years: Team
- 1907–1908: Oxford University

Career statistics
Competition	First-class
Matches	8
Runs scored	105
Batting average	9.75
100s/50s	–/–
Top score	23
Catches/stumpings	6/3
- Source: Cricinfo, 4 January 2020

Druce Robert Brandt (20 October 1887 – 6 July 1915) was an English first-class cricketer, academic and British Army officer.

The son of Robert E. Brandt and Florence Brandt, he was born at Streatham in October 1887. He was educated at Harrow School, where he met with success in sport. He was in both the football and cricket XI's, in addition to winning the lightweight public schools' boxing championship in 1903. From Harrow he went up to Brasenose College, Oxford where he played first-class cricket for Oxford University in 1907 and 1908, making eight appearances. Playing as a wicket-keeper, he scored 105 runs with a highest score of 23, while behind the stumps he took 6 catches and made 3 stumpings. After graduating from Oxford, he was employed as a lecturer and fellow by Brasenose College, Oxford. Brandt spent two years with the college, before leaving to become a social worker in Bermondsey.

Having previously been a member of the Oxford University contingent of the Officers' Training Corps, Brandt enlisted as a second lieutenant in the Rifle Brigade at the start of the First World War. He was promoted to lieutenant in February 1915 and was killed in action at Boezinge in Belgium on 6 July 1915, while commanding a company of men detailed to capture a German trench. His body was never recovered from the battlefield and he was commemorated at the Menin Gate.
