= Glen Baker =

Australian cricketer

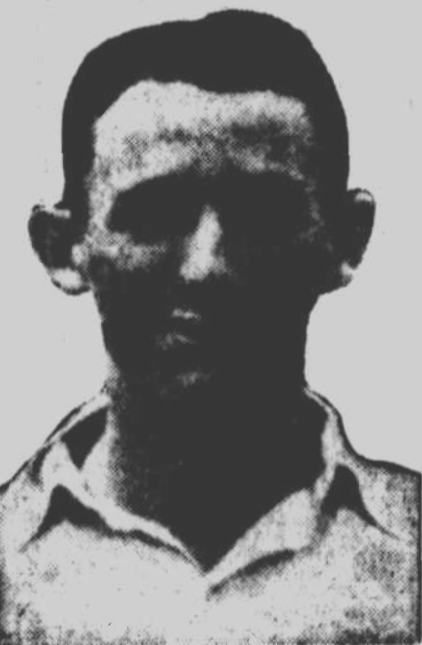

Personal information
- Full name: Glen George Baker
- Born: 9 August 1915; Queensland, Australia
- Died: 15 December 1943 (aged 28); Buna, New Guinea
- Batting: Right-handed
- Bowling: Right-arm medium

Domestic team information
- Years: Team
- 1936/37–1941/42: Queensland

Career statistics
Competition	First-class
Matches	29
Runs scored	1,531
Batting average	31.24
100s/50s	1/11
Top score	157
Balls bowled	1,021
Wickets	13
Bowling average	42.92
5 wickets in innings	0
10 wickets in match	0
Best bowling	3/17
Catches/stumpings	19/–
- Source: ESPNcricinfo, 2 December 2024

Glen George Baker (9 August 1915 – 15 December 1943) was an Australian cricketer.

Baker was a right-handed batsman and right-arm medium-pace bowler. He played 29 first-class cricket matches, all but one for Queensland, between 1936 and 1942, scoring 1,531 runs and taking 13 wickets. His highest score was 157 for Queensland against New South Wales in the first match of the 1938–39 Sheffield Shield.

Baker married Mavis Jean Barkley in Brisbane in April 1941. He died on active service in New Guinea in December 1943.
