= Richard Tindall =

English cricketer and British Army officer

Personal information
- Full name: Richard Geoffrey Tindall
- Born: 20 February 1912; Sherborne, Dorset, England
- Died: 22 January 1942 (aged 29); Ajdabiya, Cyrenaica, Italian Libya
- Batting: Right-handed
- Bowling: Right-arm fast

Domestic team information
- Years: Team
- 1933–1934: Oxford University
- 1931–1939: Dorset

Career statistics
Competition	First-class
Matches	18
Runs scored	610
Batting average	22.59
100s/50s	1/2
Top score	113
Balls bowled	3,020
Wickets	50
Bowling average	31.62
5 wickets in innings	2
10 wickets in match	0
Best bowling	5/73
Catches/stumpings	11/–
- Source: Cricinfo, 30 September 2018

Richard Geoffrey Tindall (20 February 1912 – 22 January 1942) was an English first-class cricketer and British Army officer.

== Early life, cricket and pre-WWII ==
Born at Sherborne, Dorset, Tindall was the eldest son of schoolmaster Kenneth Bassett Tindall and his wife Theodora Mary Tindall. His early education was undertaken at Hawtreys at Westgate-on-Sea, from which he attended Winchester College. From Winchester, he went up to Trinity College, Oxford, where he studied Classical Moderations and Modern Greats.

He first played minor counties cricket for Dorset in the 1931 Minor Counties Championship. His debut in first-class cricket came at the University Parks in 1933 for Oxford University against Yorkshire. Tindall played first-class cricket for Oxford University in 1933 and 1934, making 18 appearances. He scored 610 runs during his first-class career, averaging 22.59, with a high score of 113; as a fast bowler, Tindall took 50 wickets at a bowling average of 31.62, twice taking a five wicket haul. His best bowling figures of 5/73 came against the Marylebone Cricket Club in 1934. His highest batting score of 113, which was also his only century in first-class cricket, came in the same match.

Tindall also played for Oxford University A.F.C., winning a Blue in both cricket and football. He left Oxford with Third Class Honours. After graduating from Oxford, Tindall joined the staff at Eton College as a sports coach. He continued to play minor counties cricket until 1939, making a total of 49 appearances for Dorset in the Minor Counties Championship. As part of his duties with Eton, Tindall served in the Eton contingent of the Officers' Training Corps, entering in 1934 with rank of second lieutenant. He gained the rank of lieutenant in January 1938, with promotion to captain following in July 1938.

== War service and death ==
With the onset of World War II, he was commissioned in the King's Royal Rifle Corps (KRRC), At Tindall's own request, he reverted to the rank of Lieutenant in September 1940. He left with the 1st Armoured Division for North Africa on 23 September 1941. After a period of desert acclimatization, Tindall, who was by now in charge of D Company in the KRRC (having regained the rank of captain), set off for Libya. After driving for 700 miles, Tindall's battalion reached the front lines at Antelat, some forty miles north-east of Ajdabiya, where he saw immediate action.

On 21 January 1942, the German Afrika Korps attacked the British lines with tanks. With few anti-tank guns and little air support, the British were forced to retreat. Tindall was killed the following day in an air raid. His younger brother, Mark, also served in the KRRC and died in a training accident in August 1942. He is commemorated at the Alamein Memorial.
