= Percy Heath (cricketer) =

English cricketer and British Army officer (1877–1917)

Personal information
- Full name: Percy Macclesfield Heath
- Born: 16 June 1877; Poona, Bombay Presidency, British India
- Died: 14 July 1917 (aged 40); Baghdad, Mesopotamia
- Batting: Unknown
- Bowling: Unknown

Domestic team information
- Years: Team
- 1901/02–1909/10: Europeans

Career statistics
Competition	First-class
Matches	7
Runs scored	162
Batting average	14.72
100s/50s	–/–
Top score	46
Balls bowled	12
Wickets	0
Bowling average	–
5 wickets in innings	–
10 wickets in match	–
Best bowling	–
Catches/stumpings	7/–
- Source: Cricinfo, 26 March 2021

Percy Macclesfield Heath (16 June 1877 – 14 July 1917) was an English first-class cricketer and British Army officer.

Heath was born at Poona in British India in December 1878 to Percy Charles Heath, a captain in the Indian Staff Corps who was killed in 1880 at the Battle of Maiwand, and his wife, Isabella. He was educated in England at Wellington College, before attending the Royal Military College, Sandhurst. He graduated from Sandhurst in August 1897 and was commissioned into the British Indian Army as an unattached second lieutenant. He was promoted to lieutenant in October 1901, at which point he was serving with the Indian Staff Corps. He was promoted to captain in August 1906, at which point he was serving with the 110th Mahratta Light Infantry. While serving in India, Heath played first-class cricket for the Europeans cricket team. He debuted for the team in a 1901 Bombay Presidency Match against the Parsees and would go onto play in a further six first-class matches for the Europeans, playing his final match in the Bombay Triangular in 1909. All but one of his appearances came against the Parsees, with the other against the Hindus in 1908. Playing as a batsman, Heath scored 162 runs across his seven matches, with a highest score of 46. An able fieldsman, he also took seven catches.

Heath served in the First World War with the 110th Mahratta's, seeing action in the Mesopotamian campaign. He spent two and a half years in Mesopotamia, where he was twice wounded and invalidated with heat stroke in August 1915, and prior Siege of Kut he had been appointed governor of Qurna. He was promoted to major in August 1915, and was decorated by the Kingdom of Serbia in 1916 with the Order of Karađorđe's Star, 4th Class (with swords). In June 1917, he was made a temporary lieutenant colonel while commanding a battalion. Heath died in July 1917 at Baghdad from the effects of heat. He was survived by his wife, Pear St John Richardson, who he had married at Poona in 1906, having one son.
