= John Butterworth (cricketer) =

English cricketer (1905–1941)

John Compton Butterworth (17 August 1905 – 18 March 1941) was an English first-class cricketer who played for Middlesex in 1925 and Oxford University in 1926. He was born in Samarang, Java (then part of the Dutch East Indies), and was educated at Harrow School and Magdalen College, Oxford. He joined the Royal Air Force and in August 1936 played for the RAF in their annual match against the Royal Navy at Lord's. However, during World War II he was commissioned in the Royal Artillery and was killed at Shooter's Hill, London when a bomb exploded near his anti-aircraft battery.

His younger brother, Reginald Compton Butterworth, who was also a first-class cricketer, was killed in action less than a year earlier.
