= Beugneux =

- Commune
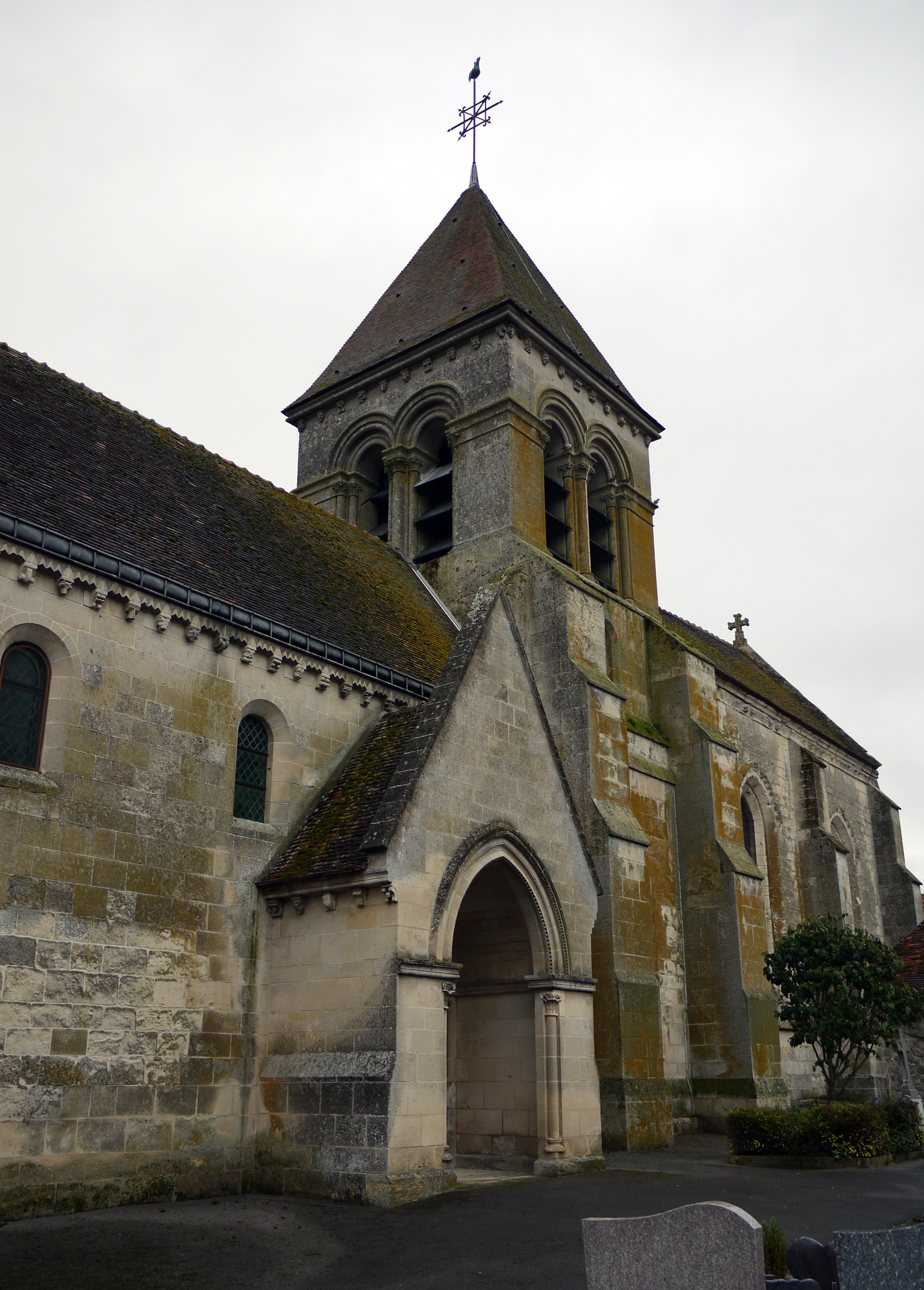

- Coat of arms
- Location of Beugneux
- Location within France Location within Hauts-de-France
- Coordinates: 49°14′06″N 3°24′53″E
- Country: France
- Region: Hauts-de-France
- Department: Aisne
- Arrondissement: Soissons
- Canton: Villers-Cotterêts
- Intercommunality: Oulchy le Château

Government
  - Mayor (2026–32): Étienne Callay
- Area^{1}: 7.68 km^{2} (2.97 sq mi)
- Elevation: 135 m (443 ft)
- Highest elevation: 202 m (663 ft)
- Lowest elevation: 92 m (302 ft)
- Population (2023): 120
  - Density: 16/km^{2} (40/sq mi)
- Time zone: UTC+01:00 (CET)
  - Summer (DST): UTC+02:00 (CEST)
- INSEE/Postal code: 02082 /02210
- ^{1} French Land Register data, which excludes lakes, ponds, glaciers > 1 km^{2} (0.386 sq mi or 247 acres) and river estuaries.

Beugneux (French pronunciation: [bœɲø]) is a commune in the department of Aisne in Hauts-de-France in northern France.

== Population ==
Historical population
Year	Pop.	±% p.a.
1968	97	—
1975	94	−0.45%
1982	92	−0.31%
1990	75	−2.52%
1999	83	+1.13%
2007	121	+4.82%
2012	113	−1.36%
2017	111	−0.36%
2023	120	+1.31%
Source: INSEE

== See also ==
- Communes of the Aisne department
