= Geoffrey Fletcher (cricketer) =

English cricketer

Personal information
- Full name: Geoffrey Everingham Fletcher
- Born: 20 July 1919; Charterhouse School, Godalming, Surrey, England
- Died: 27 March 1943 (aged 23); Djebel Saikra, Mareth Line, Matmata, Tunisia
- Batting: Right-handed

Domestic team information
- Years: Team
- 1939: Oxford University
- 1939: Somerset

Career statistics
Competition	FC
Matches	5
Runs scored	165
Batting average	18.33
100s/50s	0/1
Top score	65
Balls bowled	8
Wickets	0
Bowling average	–
5 wickets in innings	–
10 wickets in match	–
Best bowling	0/15
Catches/stumpings	4/–
- Source: CricketArchive, 22 December 2015

Geoffrey Everingham Fletcher (20 July 1919 – 27 March 1943) played first-class cricket for Oxford University and Somerset in the 1939 season. He was born at Charterhouse School, Godalming, Surrey and died in the assault on the Mareth Line in the Matmata Hills in Tunisia during the British Eighth Army's North African campaign in the Second World War.

Fletcher was educated at Marlborough College and took part in the 1938 schools cricket tournament at Lord's as a right-handed middle-order batsman. Wisden Cricketers' Almanack said he was "one of the best school cricketers of the year" in its 1939 edition. He went to New College, Oxford University in 1938 and was among a large number of freshmen in the 1939 cricket season at Oxford identified by Wisden as particularly promising. But for the war, it said, he would have been likely to have won a Blue in 1940. Competition for the university side being so intense, Fletcher appeared in only four first-class matches, and though in the game against Lancashire he scored a second innings 65 described by Wisden as "faultless", he was unable to retain his place. When the university term was over, he played one match for Somerset against Northamptonshire, scoring 19 not out and 15.

Following the outbreak of the Second World War, Fletcher was commissioned as a second lieutenant in the Rifle Brigade on 23 March 1940. He was killed during Operation Pugilist in the North African campaign.
