= Herbert Green (British Army officer) =

English cricketer and British Army officer

Brigadier General Herbert Green DSO
- Born: Herbert Walter Green; 2 April 1878; Watford, Hertfordshire, England
- Died: 31 December 1918 (aged 40); Rouen, Normandy, France
- Cricket career

Cricket information
- Batting: Unknown
- Role: Wicket-keeper

Domestic team information
- Years: Team
- 1903/04: Europeans

Career statistics
Competition	First-class
Matches	1
Runs scored	13
Batting average	6.50
100s/50s	–/–
Top score	8
Catches/stumpings	2/–
- Source: ESPNcricinfo, 26 March 2021

Herbert Walter Green DSO (2 April 1878 – 31 December 1918) was a British Army officer and English first-class cricketer.

The son of Walter James and Maria Jane Green, he was born in April 1878 at Watford. Green was educated at Charterhouse School, before going up to Exeter College, Oxford. He played cricket for both Charterhouse and Exeter College, though never featured for Oxford University Cricket Club.

After graduating from Oxford, he received a university commission into The Buffs (Royal East Kent Regiment) as a second lieutenant, the third oldest line infantry regiment in the British Army, in May 1900. A promotion to lieutenant followed in December 1901. While serving in British India, he played in a first-class cricket match in 1903 for the Europeans cricket team against the Parsees at Poona in the Bombay Presidency Match. Playing as the Europeans wicket-keeper, he took two catches in the match, while batting he was dismissed for 5 runs in the Europeans first innings by K. S. Kapadia, while in their second innings he was dismissed by Kekhashru Mistry for 8 runs. During his service in India, Green also played minor matches for Mysore.

He was seconded for service with the Colonial Office in September 1910, where he was sent to Nigeria to serve with the Royal West African Frontier Force. While still seconded to the Colonial Office, he was promoted to captain in October 1911.

Green was still serving in Nigeria when the First World War began in July 1914. Promoted to major in September 1915, he was posted to France in 1916 and briefly commanded a battalion of the Essex Regiment, while holding the temporary rank of lieutenant colonel. Following his secondment to the Essex Regiment, Green returned to The Buffs where he fought in the Battle of the Somme in 1916. He was awarded the Distinguished Service Order (DSO) in the 1917 New Year Honours, 'for gallant and distinguished service in the field'. He was made a brevet lieutenant colonel in December 1917, having been made a temporary brigadier general the previous month while commanding the 10th Infantry Brigade of the 4th Division.

He returned to England in April 1918 where he supervised volunteer training on the East Coast, before returning to the Western Front in October 1918, where he commanded the 1st Battalion of the Queen's Royal Regiment (West Surrey). He was seriously wounded in action at Landrecies on 7 November, just four days prior to the Armistice of 11 November 1918. He was evacuated to No. 8 General Hospital at Rouen, where he died on 31 December, following surgery. He was buried in Rouen at the St Sever Cemetery.
