= John Argentine Campbell =

Scotland international rugby union player & Argentina cricketer

- Born: John Argentine Campbell; 20 October 1877 Flores, Buenos Aires, Argentina
- Died: 2 December 1917 (aged 40) Villers-Guislain, France
- School: Fettes College
- University: Trinity College, Cambridge

Rugby union career
- Position: Forward
Amateur team(s)
Years	Team	Apps	(Points)
- Cambridge University
- Fettesian-Lorettonian
- West of Scotland
International career
Years	Team	Apps	(Points)
1900	Scotland	1	(0)
- Cricket career

Cricket information

International information
- National side: Argentina (1912)

Career statistics
Competition	First-class
Matches	1
Runs scored	4
Batting average	2.00
100s/50s	0/0
Top score	4
Catches/stumpings	0/–
- Source: CricketArchive, 12 August 2018
- Military career
- Allegiance: United Kingdom
- Branch: British Army
- Service years: 1915–1917
- Rank: Lieutenant
- Units: 17th Lancers, 6th (Inniskilling) Dragoons
- Conflicts: World War I: Western Front; Battle of Cambrai (DOW)

John Argentine Campbell (20 October 1877 – 2 December 1917) was a sportsman who represented Scotland in rugby union and Argentina in cricket. Born in Argentina to a Scottish father and educated in Scotland, he was also an accomplished polo player. He was killed while serving with British forces in World War I.

== Biography ==
Campbell was born on 20 October 1877 in Flores, then a rural area on the outskirts of Buenos Aires, Argentina. He was the third of four children of Glasgow-born rancher John Campbell and Maria del Rosario Robson, who had married in Buenos Aires in February 1873. He was sent to the United Kingdom to be educated, attending Fettes College in Edinburgh from 1887 to 1897, where he was head boy and developed into a promising all-round sportsman. He then went on to Trinity College, Cambridge, graduating with a Bachelor of Arts degree in 1900. After leaving university he returned to Scotland, and briefly taught at Loretto School near Edinburgh. In 1904 he returned permanently to Argentina, to farm with his father on the family estate at Estancia La Corona. He married Myra Gertrude Grant and had three children.

== Rugby union ==
Campbell played in the Fettes school rugby XV for four years, captaining them in his final year. At university, he was a rugby blue, representing Cambridge three times in The Varsity Match against Oxford and captaining them to a 22–0 win in the 1899 fixture. Every member of the Cambridge forward pack that year went on to play international rugby, and were described by Howard Marshall in his history of the matches between the two universities as, "perhaps the greatest ... Cambridge had ever had".

His ancestry qualified Campbell to represent Scotland. After a heavy defeat against Wales in the 1900 Home Nations Championship, the Scottish selectors made eight changes for the following match against Ireland, with Campbell one of four new forwards chosen. The match, at Lansdowne Road in Dublin, ended in a 0–0 draw. Although the Edinburgh Evening News reported that Campbell "did very well", blood poisoning sustained in Dublin caused him to miss the subsequent match against England, and he never played international rugby again.

Whilst teaching at Loretto, Campbell played club rugby for the Fettesian-Lorettonian Club, where he was captain, and for West of Scotland. In December 1901, he represented Glasgow District in the inter-district match against Edinburgh. His rugby career ended when he returned to Argentina.

== Cricket ==
Campbell also captained the cricket XI at Fettes. In 1901, he was selected for an East of Scotland XI that played against the touring South Africans in Edinburgh. He continued to play cricket in Buenos Aires, making his only first-class appearance in February 1912 when he was chosen to represent Argentina against a Marylebone Cricket Club (MCC) touring team captained by Lord Hawke at the Hurlingham Club Ground. Campbell scored 0 and 4 as Argentina won by four wickets.

== Polo ==
Campbell was one of the leading polo players in Argentina, winning the Campeonato Argentino Abierto de Polo with his Western Camps team in 1907 and 1909. His mount 'Old Boy' was voted the best pony in the 1909 River Plate Championship. A nine-goal handicap player, described as "always beautifully mounted", Campbell also visited Britain successfully with the El Bagual (Wild Boar) team in 1912.

== Military career and death ==
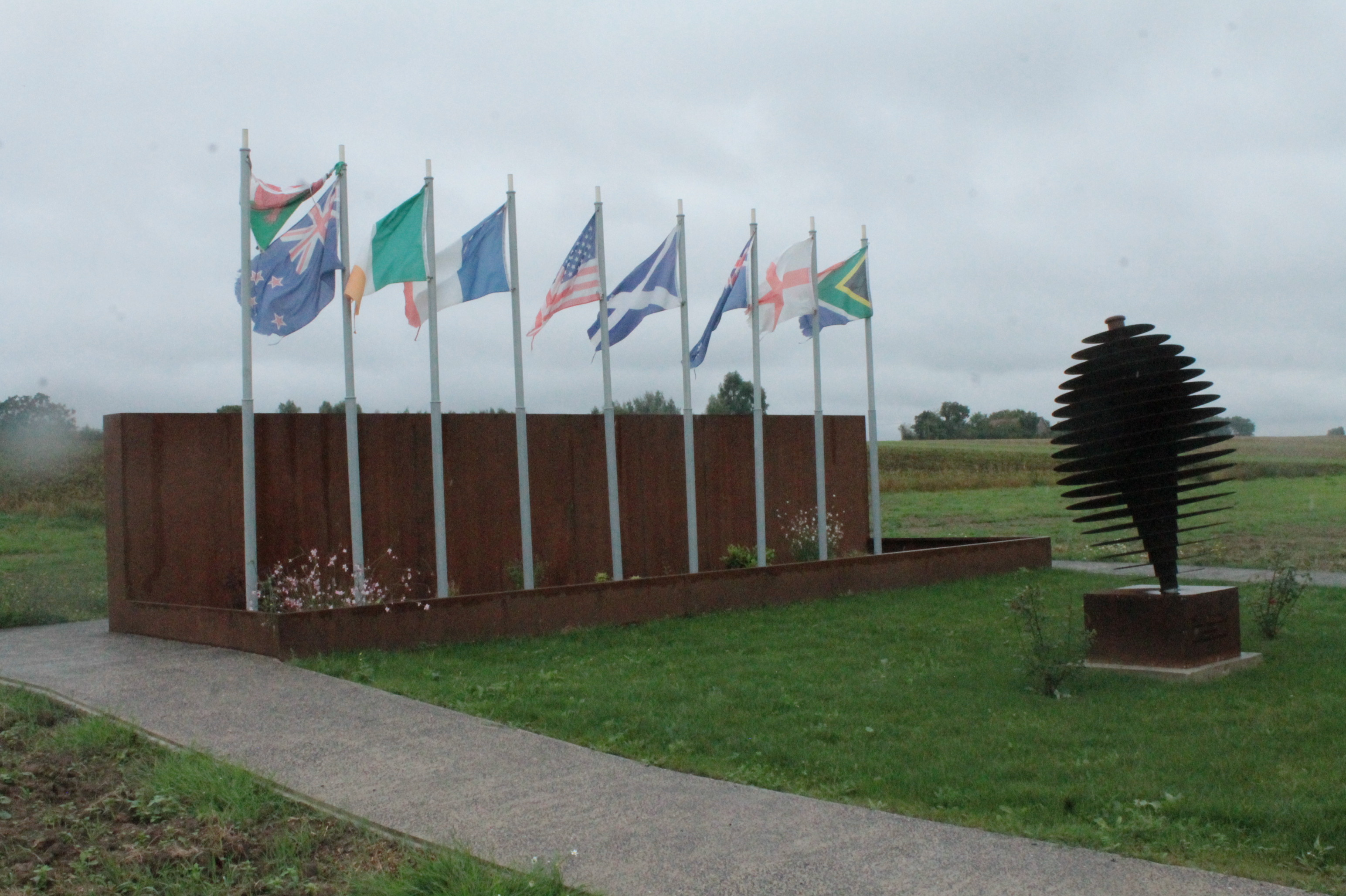
Memorial to the 133 rugby players killed in the Great War, at Fromelles

Despite being in Argentina when World War I broke out in Europe, Campbell saw it as his patriotic duty to aid the British war effort. He immediately ceased his polo career, feeling it was inappropriate to play during wartime. He travelled to England in 1915 to volunteer, being commissioned into the 17th Lancers and subsequently the 6th (Inniskilling) Dragoons as a lieutenant. He went to France on active service in February 1916. The following year, following his father's death, Campbell was given leave to travel to Argentina to sort out his affairs. Returning by sea to rejoin his regiment, he and his wife survived a shipwreck off the Welsh coast when the SS Drina struck a German mine.

On 1 December 1917, during the Battle of Cambrai, Campbell was taking part in a mounted cavalry charge near Villers-Guislain when he was mortally wounded and captured. He died the following day in a German field hospital and was buried at the British military cemetery in Honnechy, France.

Campbell is listed among the 133 rugby players killed in the Great War in the memorial at Fromelles in north France.

== Legacy ==
Campbell's son, J. D. "Tony" Campbell, also won a Cambridge rugby blue, playing in the 1927 Varsity Match. The 2017 match marked the centenary of the deaths on service of two former captains, Campbell and Oxford's Cecil Baker, who were jointly named as the first Varsity Match Icons. Representatives of the Campbell family and Fettes College were in attendance.

As of 2017, the family estate in Argentina was still run by Campbell's grandson, also named John Argentine Campbell.
