= John Shadwell (cricketer) =

English cricketer

Personal information
- Full name: John Robert Shadwell
- Born: April 1919; Stockbridge, Hampshire, England
- Died: 25 April 1942 (aged 23); Sagar, Central Provinces and Berar, British India

Domestic team information
- Years: Team
- 1941: Europeans

Career statistics
Competition	First-class
Matches	1
Runs scored	2
Batting average	1.00
100s/50s	0/0
Top score	1
Catches/stumpings	0/0
- Source: ESPNcricinfo, 6 August 2020

John Robert Shadwell (April 1919 – 25 April 1942) was an English first-class cricketer and British Army officer.

Born in Hampshire in April 1919, Shadwell was the son of Frederick Charles and Elsie May Shadwell. After attending Royal Military College, Sandhurst as an officer cadet, he was commissioned on 24 January 1940 as a second lieutenant in the 1st Battalion, Wiltshire Regiment, which at that time was stationed in Madras for coastal defence duties as a result of the outbreak of the Second World War.

Shadwell appeared in one first-class Madras Presidency match for Europeans against Indians at the Madras Cricket Club Ground on 12 January 1941. He scored 2 runs but was dismissed both innings. On 25 April 1942, Captain Shadwell died of illness at Sagar and was buried at Kirkee War Cemetery, Pune.
