= Lestock Adams =

English cricketer

Personal information
- Full name: Lestock Handley Adams
- Born: 10 September 1887; Ormskirk, Lancashire, England
- Died: 22 April 1918 (aged 30); Placaut Wood, Pas-de-Calais, France
- Role: Bowler

Domestic team information
- Years: Team
- 1908–1910: Cambridge University
- FC debut: 25 May 1908 Cambridge University v Lancashire
- Last FC: 27 June 1910 Gentlemen of England v Cambridge University

Career statistics
Competition	First-class
Matches	6
Runs scored	61
Batting average	12.20
100s/50s	0/0
Top score	21*
Balls bowled	866
Wickets	17
Bowling average	31.23
5 wickets in innings	1
10 wickets in match	0
Best bowling	6/86
Catches/stumpings	1/–
- Source: ESPNcricinfo, 17 April 2014

Lestock Handley Adams (10 September 1887 – 22 April 1918) was an English first-class cricketer who played for Cambridge University between 1908 and 1910. Six of his games attained first-class status, and in these he took 17 wickets and scored 61 runs. Born in Ormskirk, in Lancashire, he was a gentlemen cricketer who played for the Gentlemen of England and various representative teams. Emigrating to Canada, he served in the armed forces during World War I, and was killed in Placaut Wood, France aged 30.

== Playing career ==
The son of Reverend Henry Frederick Spencer Adams and Ethel Emma Louisa Reid, Adams lived in Congresbury, Somerset in his early years, as recorded in the 1891 census. He lost his mother in 1900. Educated at St. Lawrence College, Ramsgate, he was captain of the First XI there for both cricket, rugby and hockey. While attending Queens' College, at Cambridge University, he played a Seniors Match at the invitation of Robert Baily to face an XI created by Charles Lucas. The match, billed as CE Lucas' XI v REH Baily's XI, began on 4 May 1908. Adams, a batsman and bowler of unknown handedness, batted last, scoring four, and took three wickets at the cost of 33 runs. He scored four more in his second innings, and went wickless off three overs as his side took a 61-run victory.

Adams went on to make his first-class debut on 25 May against Lancashire. He went wicketless, but managed to score 21 in his seconds innings. Cambridge suffered a 171-run defeat. Cambridge then played a representative XI led by Gerry Weigall, where he took 1/66 in a straightforward victory. Adams did not play another recorded match until May 1910, where he appeared an exhibition game, Etceteras v Perambulators. Adams featured in the latter team, and took a five wicket haul. On 30 May he faced Kent, taking 3/52, and on 6 June he took 2/66 against the Free Foresters. He took his career-best 6/86 against Sussex on 20 June, with three more wickets in the second innings, but went wicketless against the Marylebone Cricket Club a week later in a rain-affected game. On 27 June he made his final first-class appearance, Gentlemen of England v Cambridge University. Playing for the Gentlemen, he took 2/96 and 2/32, and made a pair with the bat – two scores of zero. He is recorded as living in Broadstairs in Kent in the 1911 census. He moved to Canada and married Emilie Anderson d'Auquier in 1913, residing near Winnipeg, playing with "some success" at Winnipeg Cricket Club, according to Wisden. He took part in two games against a touring Australian side in 1913, taking one wicket in the first and 3/62 in the second.

== Military career ==
Adams enlisted in the armed forces and served in The Rifle Brigade, rising to the rank of lieutenant. Part of the 1st Battalion of the Rifles, he was killed in France in 1918. He is buried at Le Vertannoy British Cemetery, Pas de Calais.
