= Gordon Kinvig =

New Zealand cricketer (1888–1917)

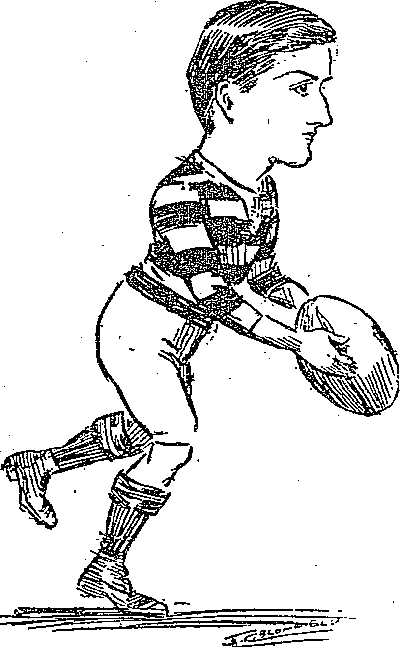
- 1910 drawing of Kinvig

Personal information
- Full name: James Gordon Kinvig
- Born: 19 June 1888; Christchurch, New Zealand
- Died: 31 July 1917 (aged 29); Ploegsteert Wood, Belgium
- Batting: Right-handed
- Bowling: Left-arm medium

Domestic team information
- Years: Team
- 1909/10: Wellington

Career statistics
| Competition | First-class |
|---|---|
| Matches | 2 |
| Runs scored | 40 |
| Batting average | 10.00 |
| 100s/50s | 0/0 |
| Top score | 17 |
| Balls bowled | 88 |
| Wickets | 4 |
| Bowling average | 17.50 |
| 5 wickets in innings | 0 |
| 10 wickets in match | 0 |
| Best bowling | 3/36 |
| Catches/stumpings | 0/– |
- Source: Cricinfo, 9 March 2018

James Gordon Kinvig (19 June 1888 – 31 July 1917) was a New Zealand cricketer, rugby union footballer and soldier.

== Life ==
Kinvig was born in Christchurch and educated at Christchurch Boys' High School, where he was a champion sportsman. He moved to Wellington in about 1909 to work in his father's warehousing business. In 1914 he went to Melbourne for business reasons. He returned to Wellington in 1915.

Kinvig enlisted in the Wellington Regiment in September 1915 and embarked for Suez in May 1916 as a sergeant. After service in France and officer training in England, he was commissioned as a second lieutenant in the Wellington Second Battalion. He served some time in the trenches. Early in the morning of 31 July 1917, he was killed in the attack on La Basse Ville during the Battle of Pilckem Ridge as part of the Battle of Passchendaele.

== Cricket career ==
A right-handed lower-order batsman, left-arm medium-pace bowler and fine fieldsman, Kinvig was a successful player at club level but played only two matches for Wellington. In his first match, against the touring Australians in February 1910, he took 3 for 36 in the Australians' first innings. A few weeks before, opening the bowling for his club Central in senior Wellington cricket, he had taken 5 for 2.

== Rugby career ==
Kinvig played rugby union for Wellington from 1909 to 1913. He was a centre three-quarter with a safe pair of hands, and an accurate left-foot kick in both field play and conversions. He played 26 times for Wellington, scoring eight tries, converting 12 tries, and kicking one penalty goal and one field goal – a total of 53 points.

After his death his family donated a section of land he owned in Karori to the Wellington Rugby Union to be sold and the proceeds used to improve Athletic Park, Wellington.
