= List of Old Cliftonians =

Former pupils of Clifton College in Bristol in the West of England

This is a list of notable Old Cliftonians, former pupils of Clifton College in Bristol in the West of England.

See also Category:People educated at Clifton College.

== Academics ==
- John Barron – classicist and Master of St Peter's College, Oxford
- Eric Birley – Vindolanda archaeologist, classical scholar
- Simon Blackburn – philosopher, founder of quasi-realism
- Frederick S. Boas – English scholar
- Horatio Brown – historian
- Norman O. Brown – author, philosopher
- Charles Coulson – mathematician and theoretical chemist
- G. E. M. de Ste. Croix Classical scholar
- Sir Charles Firth – historian
- Paul Grice – philosopher of language
- Sir Thomas Heath – polymath, civil servant, mathematician, classical scholar, historian of ancient Greek mathematics, translator and mountaineer
- Geoffrey Hinton – computer scientist and cognitive psychologist
- Arthur Hutchinson – mineralogist, professor, and Master of Pembroke College, Cambridge
- Arthur Jose – historian and journalist
- John Kendrew – biochemist and crystallographer, joint winner of 1962 Nobel Prize in Chemistry
- Martin Lings – scholar
- Patrick McGuinness – academic, critic, novelist and poet
- John McTaggart Ellis McTaggart – philosopher
- John Pinkerton – designer of world's first business computer, the LEO computer
- Harold Arthur Prichard – philosopher
- Reginald Punnett – geneticist
- Ivor Armstrong Richards – scholar, critic, rhetorician, author The Meaning of Meaning
- Edgar Samuel – Director of the London Jewish Museum
- Sir Richard Threlfall – physicist and chemical engineer
- Herbert Hall Turner – Professor of Astronomy and seismologist
- Conrad Hal Waddington – developmental biologist, palaeontologist, geneticist, embryologist and philosopher
- Sir Thomas Herbert Warren – Professor of Poetry and Vice-Chancellor of Oxford University
- R. P. Winnington-Ingram – scholar of Greek tragedy, Professor of Greek at King's College London
- Dr Christopher Rowland Payne – doctor and professor

== Public life and the law ==
- Sir John Dyke Acland, 16th Baronet
- Sir James Allen – New Zealand politician
- Osman Ali Baig – MBE, Indian Army officer, Pakistani diplomat and statesman, and Secretary-General of CENTO
- Michael Bear – Lord Mayor of London (2010/11)
- Christopher Birdwood, 2nd Baron Birdwood – Conservative member of the House of Lords
- Arthur Shirley Benn, 1st Baron Glenravel – KBE Conservative MP.
- Leslie Hore-Belisha – Minister of War (1937–1940)
- Sir Edward John Cameron KCMG – colonial administrator
- Lothian Bonham-Carter – English cricketer, Justice of the Peace and soldier
- Sir Edgar Bonham-Carter – KCMG CIE Barrister
- John Bonham-Carter (1817–1884) – Liberal Party politician
- Sydney Buxton, 1st Earl Buxton GCMG PC
- Sir John Biggs-Davison – Conservative politician
- Sir Richard Cooper, 2nd Baronet – Conservative MP
- Thomas Inskip, 1st Viscount Caldecote – lawyer, politician and Lord Chancellor
- Alban Dobson – civil servant, secretary of the International Whaling Commission, president of the International Council for the Exploration of the Sea
- Raymond Evershed, 1st Baron Evershed – Master of the Rolls and Law Lord
- Geoff Gollop OBE – Deputy Mayor of Bristol, former Lord Mayor and former Deputy Lord Mayor of Bristol
- Jeremy Hackett – British fashion designer, founder of Hackett clothing
- Sir James Heath, 1st Baronet Bt – MP North West Staffordshire.
- Herbert Hervey, 5th Marquess of Bristol – diplomat
- Sir Thomas Heath – Treasury Secretary and scholar and author.
- Baron Henley 8th Baron Henley. Tory Politician
- Sir Roger Hollis – journalist, secret-service agent and director general of MI5
- Syed Fakhar Imam – the 11th Speaker of National Assembly of Pakistan.
- Patrick Jenkin – Conservative politician
- Sir John Keane, 5th Baronet – Irish Politician, Senator 1st, 2nd, 3rd Seanad
- Neville Laski QC – Judge and leader of Anglo Jewry
- Sir John May – Judge
- Navendu Mishra – Labour MP
- Sir Alan Mocatta – English judge, leader of Spanish and Portuguese Jews in the UK
- Edwin Montagu – Liberal politician
- Louis Samuel Montagu, 2nd Baron Swaythling
- Sir Max Muspratt, 1st Baronet – Industrialist and Liberal MP
- Sir Peter Newsam – chairman of Commission for Racial Equality and Inner London Education Authority chief education officer.
- Arthur Richards, 1st Baron Milverton GCMG
- Hector Sants – head of the Financial Services Authority
- Colin Sleeman – Assistant Judge Advocate General, senior defence counsel for Japanese accused of war crimes
- Abel Thomas – Welsh Liberal MP
- Josiah Wedgwood, 1st Baron Wedgwood – brother of Sir Ralph Wedgwood, 1st Baronet, Liberal and Labour Minister in Ramsay MacDonald government.
- Sir Ralph Wedgwood, 1st Baronet
- Philip William Wheeldon Bishop of Whitby
- Sir Rowland Whitehead, 3rd Baronet KC MP – barrister and politician
- John Henry Whitley – Speaker of the House of Commons (1921–1928)
- Leonard Wolfson, Baron Wolfson – conservative politician
- Baron Wyfold – Colonel Sir Robert Trotter Hermon-Hodge, Bt MP.

Sir Frances Younghusband

== Military ==
- Field Marshal Douglas Haig, 1st Earl Haig
- Field Marshal William Birdwood – 1st Baron Birdwood
- David Clemetson – British Army officer
- Lieutenant General Frederick E. Morgan
- Sir Francis Younghusband – British Army officer, explorer, and spiritualist
- Sir Hugh Elles KCB KCMG KCVO DSO – general
- Sir Charles Bonham-Carter – General of the Territorial Army and Governor and Commander-in-Chief of Malta.
- Lieutenant Colonel Oswald Watt – Australian flying ace in First World War
- Percy Hobart KBE CB DSO MC – military engineer
- Cecil Rawling CMG CIE DSO FRGS – soldier, explorer and author
- Alexander Kearsey OBE, DSO – soldier, cricketer and military historian
- Lothian Bonham-Carter – English cricketer, Justice of the Peace and soldier
- Jock Hamilton-Baillie MC
- John Whitty MC DSO
- Sir Charles Cuyler, 4th Baronet OBE, soldier and cricketer
- Leslie Innes Jacques CB, CBE, MC – British Army engineer officer

=== Holders of the Victoria Cross ===
Eight Old Cliftonians have won the Victoria Cross – one in the Second Boer War, five in the First World War (1914–1918), one in the Russian Civil War (North Russia Relief Force, 1919), and one in the Second World War.

- Second Boer War:
  - Sergeant Horace Robert Martineau VC (at Clifton 1888–1889) (1874–1916). He later achieved the rank of Lieutenant.
- First World War:
  - Richard Douglas Sandford VC (11 May 1891 – 23 November 1918) was a Royal Navy officer who took part in the Zeebrugge Raid and won the Victoria Cross.
  - Captain Theodore Wright VC (at Clifton 1897–1900) (1883–1914)
  - Lieutenant Cyril Gordon Martin VC CBE DSO (at Clifton 1910-1910) (1891–1980). He later achieved the rank of Brigadier.
  - Lieutenant Edward Donald Bellew VC (at Clifton 1897–1900) (1882–1961). He later achieved the rank of Captain.
  - Captain George Henry Tatham Paton VC MC (at Clifton 1909–1914) (1895–1917)
- Russian Civil War:
  - Commander Claude Congreve Dobson VC DSO (at Clifton 1893–1900) (1885–1940)
- Second World War:
  - Lance-Corporal John Pennington Harman VC (at Clifton 1923–1925) (1914–1944)

== Arts and sciences ==
=== Literature ===
- Charles Bean – War Correspondent and Official Historian of Australia during the First World War
- Joyce Cary – writer
- Robin Fedden – writer
- L. P. Hartley – author
- Robert Hichens – Author and playwright
- Geoffrey Household – author
- C. H. B. Kitchin – author
- Tim Mackintosh-Smith – author and television presenter
- Alan Noel Latimer Munby – author
- Henry Newbolt – poet
- Arthur Quiller-Couch – poet (pseudonym "Q").
- George Shipway – novelist
- Montague Summers – author, translator, occultist, scandalous clergyman and member of Uranian bards of Greco-Roman pederasty.

=== Drama, theatre, television and performing arts ===
- Konstantin Kisin – Triggernometry

Comedian and host of the Triggernometry podcast. Konstantin allegedly suffered bullying because he was a foreigner without fluent English speaking.

- John Cleese – Monty Python actor
- Jo Clifford, transgender playwright
- Manuel del Campo – film editor, actor, and third husband to Mary Astor
- Thorold Dickinson – film director, screenwriter and producer.
- William Hanson – television presenter, podcaster and etiquette coach.
- Chris Harris – automotive journalist and television presenter
- Donald Hewlett – actor
- John Houseman – actor, director and producer
- Trevor Howard – actor
- John Inverdale – television presenter
- Elliot Levey – actor
- John Madden – film director
- Roger Michell – film & theatre director
- Alan Napier – actor
- Sir Michael Redgrave – actor
- Sir Simon Russell Beale – actor
- Chris Serle – television presenter
- Simon Shepherd – actor
- Tim Sullivan – film and television director and screenwriter
- Clive Swift – actor
- David Swift – actor
- Naunton Wayne – actor

=== Music ===
- Joseph Cooper
- Scott Ford – musician
- John Rippiner Heath – physician and composer
- Craig Sellar Lang – organist and composer
- Boris Ord – conductor
- Ian Partridge – tenor
- Harry Plunket Greene
- A. J. Potter – composer
- Martina Topley-Bird – musician
- Peter Tranchell – composer
- Sir David Willcocks – conductor
- Jonathan Willcocks – composer
- Nicky Chinn – songwriter
- Kitty Brucknell – singer/songwriter

=== Education ===
- C. T. Atkinson – tutor in history at Exeter College, Oxford (1898–1955).
- J. R. Eccles – schoolmaster and author

=== Fine arts ===
- Roger Fry – artist
- Derek Gillman – President of the Barnes Foundation
- Peter Lanyon – Cornish painter of Euston Road School.
- Henry Tonks – English surgeon, artist, like Fry, Slade Professor of Fine Art

=== Science ===
- Philip D'Arcy Hart – pioneer in tuberculosis treatment
- Victor Riddell FRCS – cricketer and surgeon
- Frank Yates FRS – statistician

=== Nobel Prize winners ===
- John Kendrew (Chemistry)
- John Hicks (Economics)
- Nevill Francis Mott (Physics)

== Journalism ==
- Sir William Emsley Carr – Chairman of News of the World
- Roger Alton – editor of The Observer
- Ian Black, reporter and editor for The Guardian
- Leigh Brownlee – cricketer and former editor of the Daily Mirror
- Ben Clatworthy — Whitehall editor of The Times
- Francis Wrigley Hirst – editor of The Economist
- Hugh Schofield – BBC Paris Correspondent
- Angus Scott – sports broadcaster
- Steve Scott – ITV newscaster and former ITN foreign correspondent
- Richard Stott – journalist
- Andrew Wilson – Sky News news presenter and former foreign correspondent

== Sports (in alphabetical order) ==
=== Cricket, rugby and football ===
- Basil Allen – cricketer, Gloucestershire captain
- Joseph Beardsell – cricketer
- Lothian Bonham-Carter – English cricketer, Justice of the Peace and soldier
- William Brain – English cricketer and footballer
- Bernard Brodhurst – cricketer
- James Bush Gloucestershire cricketer, England rugby international
- Robert Edwin Bush Gloucestershire cricketer
- Charles Carnegy MVO, cricketer
- A. E. J. Collins – cricketer, world record holder (highest individual score as batsman)
- John Daniell – captain of Somerset, England rugby international
- David Dickinson – cricketer
- Alban Dobson – cricketer
- Archibald Fargus – English cricketer, scholar, clergyman
- Immanuel Feyi-Waboso – England and Exeter Chiefs rugby player
- Edwin Field – Middlesex cricketer, England rugby international
- Sir Stephen Finney – England rugby international
- W. G. Grace Jr – Gloucestershire and MCC cricketer
- Paul Green-Armytage – cricketer
- George Harrison – cricketer
- Hubert Johnston – Scottish cricketer
- R. P. Keigwin – England cricketer and hockey player
- Sir Kingsmill Key – Bt., captain of Surrey, MCC and England cricketer.
- James Kirtley – England cricketer
- Ioan Lloyd – Wales and Scarlets rugby player
- Leslie Lloyd – cricketer
- Meredith Magniac – cricketer
- Frank May – cricketer
- Norman McLeod - England rugby international
- Thomas Penny – cricketer
- Rowland Raw – cricketer
- William Cecil Welsh Rawlinson (1855–1898), - England rugby union international and British Army officer
- Henry Schwann – cricketer
- Dr. Edward Scott – Gloucestershire & MCC cricketer, England rugby international (captain).
- Louie Shaw – cricketer
- Thomas Stubbs – cricketer
- Charlie Townsend – England cricketer
- Edward Tylecote – England cricketer
- Henry Tylecote – cricketer
- William van Someren – cricketer
- George Whitehead – England cricketer
- John Whitty – cricketer and British Army officer
- Matt Windows – Gloucestershire cricketer and England 'A' cap.

=== Other ===
- Jerry Cornes – English Olympic runner
- Justin Chaston – Welsh athlete who competed at three Olympic Games for Great Britain
- Tony Crook - racing driver, motor dealer, and owner of Bristol Cars
- Walter Gibb – world record holder (altitude)
- Sir Edward Atholl Oakeley – Baronet, pioneer of professional wrestling
- William H. K. Pollock – English chess master
- Lily Owsley – Hockey GB and England
- Boris Schapiro – bridge player
- Simon Hazlitt – Hockey GB and England

== Business ==
- W. O. Bentley – founder of Bentley Motors
- Sir John Beynon, 1st Baronet – entrepreneur of the fossil fuel and metals industry
- Sir Trevor Chinn – tycoon and philanthropist
- Edward Cruttwell – civil engineer particularly associated with London's Tower Bridge
- Sir Hugo Cunliffe-Owen, 1st Baronet – business man, chairman of British-American Tobacco Company
- Sir Roy Fedden – engineer
- Jeremy Hackett – fashion designer and entrepreneur
- Patrick Seager Hill T.D. – clothing manufacturer, pioneer & developer of safety & fire protective clothing
- Andy Hornby – former Chief Executive of HBOS
- Anthony Jacobs, Baron Jacobs – entrepreneur
- Sir Horace Kadoorie – industrialist, hotelier, and philanthropist
- Lord Kadoorie – industrialist, hotelier, and philanthropist
- Julian Richer – retailer, author and philanthropist, founder of Richer Sounds
- Sir James Swinburne, 9th Baronet – industrialist
- Hector Sants – head of the Financial Services Authority
- Sir Clive Thompson – former Chairman of Farepak and Chief Executive of Rentokil Initial
- Sir Robert Waley Cohen – industrialist and leader of Anglo-Jewry
- Sir Bernard Waley-Cohen – business man and Lord Mayor of London
- Henry Herbert Wills – tobacco baron and philanthropist
- Leonard Wolfson, Baron Wolfson – business man, chairman of GUS
- David Wolfson, Baron Wolfson of Sunningdale – politician, businessman, chairman of Next

== Other ==
- Rowley Leigh – English chef
- Michael Francis Middleton – Businessman and father of Catherine, Princess of Wales. Both Middleton's father,
- Ernest Geoffrey Parsons CVO, CBE, farmer and a commissioner of the crown estates.

== Fictional ==
- Christopher Tietjens – the protagonist of Ford Madox Ford's Parade's End.

== See also ==
- Old Cliftonian Society
