= Old Cliftonian Society =

The Old Cliftonian Society (OCS) is the Society for the alumni of Clifton College (both pupils and staff who have received honorary membership) and organises regular reunions at the school and publishes a regular newsletter for alumni.

The Society publishes an annual magazine for alumni called "The Cliftonian".

== Clifton College Register ==
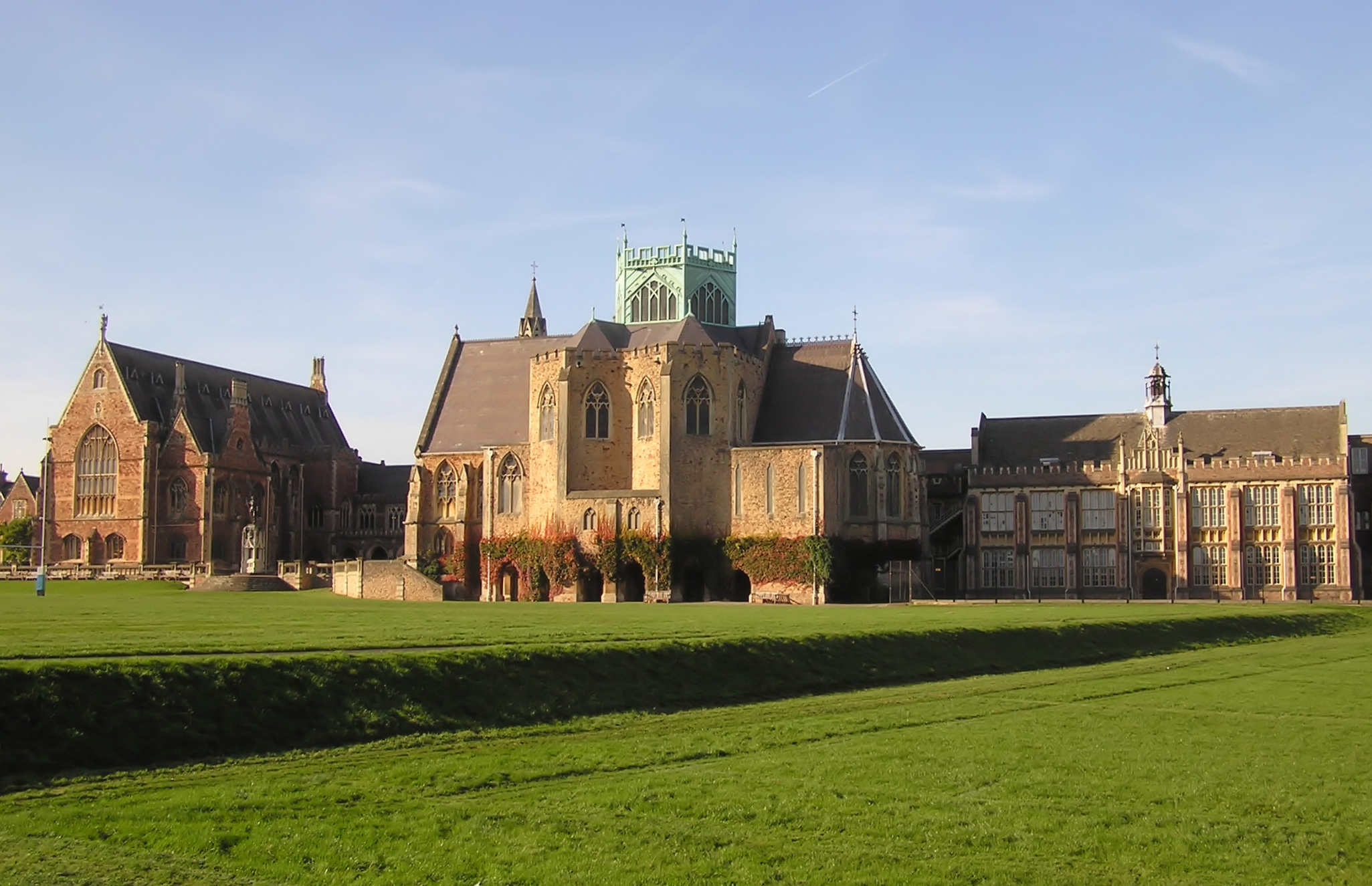
Clifton College Upper School seen from the Close. Left - the Dining Hall, centre - the Chapel, right - the science block

The register's motto:

"There be of them, that have left a name behind them, that their praises might be reported..."

The Clifton College Register is the definitive set of records held for Clifton College in Bristol. The Register is kept and maintained by the Old Cliftonian Society.

The record has been maintained unbroken from the start of the school in 1862 and lists every pupil, master and headmaster. Each person is allocated a unique and consecutive school number - and for masters and headmasters the number is prefixed with either an M or HM as appropriate. The Register also maintains a record of the school roll in numbers, the Heads of School and summarises the major sporting records for each year.

The Register is periodically published by the Old Cliftonian Society; at present there are three available volumes:

- 1862 - 1947
- 1948 - 1977
- 1978 - 1994

A new edition is currently being prepared (2010).

== List of Headmasters from the register ==
Allocated consecutive numbers, prefixed HM

- HM1 - John Percival - Lord Bishop of Hereford
- HM2 - Canon James Wilson (1879–1890)
- HM3 - Canon Michael George Glazebrook
- HM4 - Rev. Albert Augustus David
- HM5 - Dr John David King
- HM6 - Norman Whatley
- HM7 - Bertrand Leslie Hallward
- HM8 - Henry Desmond Pritchard Lee
- HM9 - Nicholas Geoffrey Lempriere Hammond
- HM10 - Steve John McWatters
- HM11 - Stuart Morrison Andrew
- HM12 - Andrew Hugh Monro
- HM13 - Dr Stephen Spurr
- HM14 - Mark Moore
- HM15 - Dr Tim Greene

== Old Cliftonians ==
See List of Old Cliftonians

== First entries in the Register ==
Pupils Allocated consecutive numbers, prefixed P

- P1. Sept 1862 - Francis Charles Anderson (b 14 Nov 1846 - d 1881)

Masters Allocated consecutive numbers, prefixed M

- M1. Sept 1862 - Rev. Dr. Thomas Henry Stokoe. (Educated at Uppingham; Exhibition at Lincoln College Oxford. Left - 1863. d 1903)

Headmasters Allocated consecutive numbers, prefixed HM

- HM1 - John Percival - Lord Bishop of Hereford

== The early years ==
- Numbers of pupils in the school

- 1862 - 69
- 1863 - 195 (including the new junior school)
- 1864 - 237
- 1865 - 258
- 1866 - 278

- Heads of School

- 1862 - HW Wellesley
- 1863 - AW Paul

== Sources ==
- The Clifton College Register - various editions.
