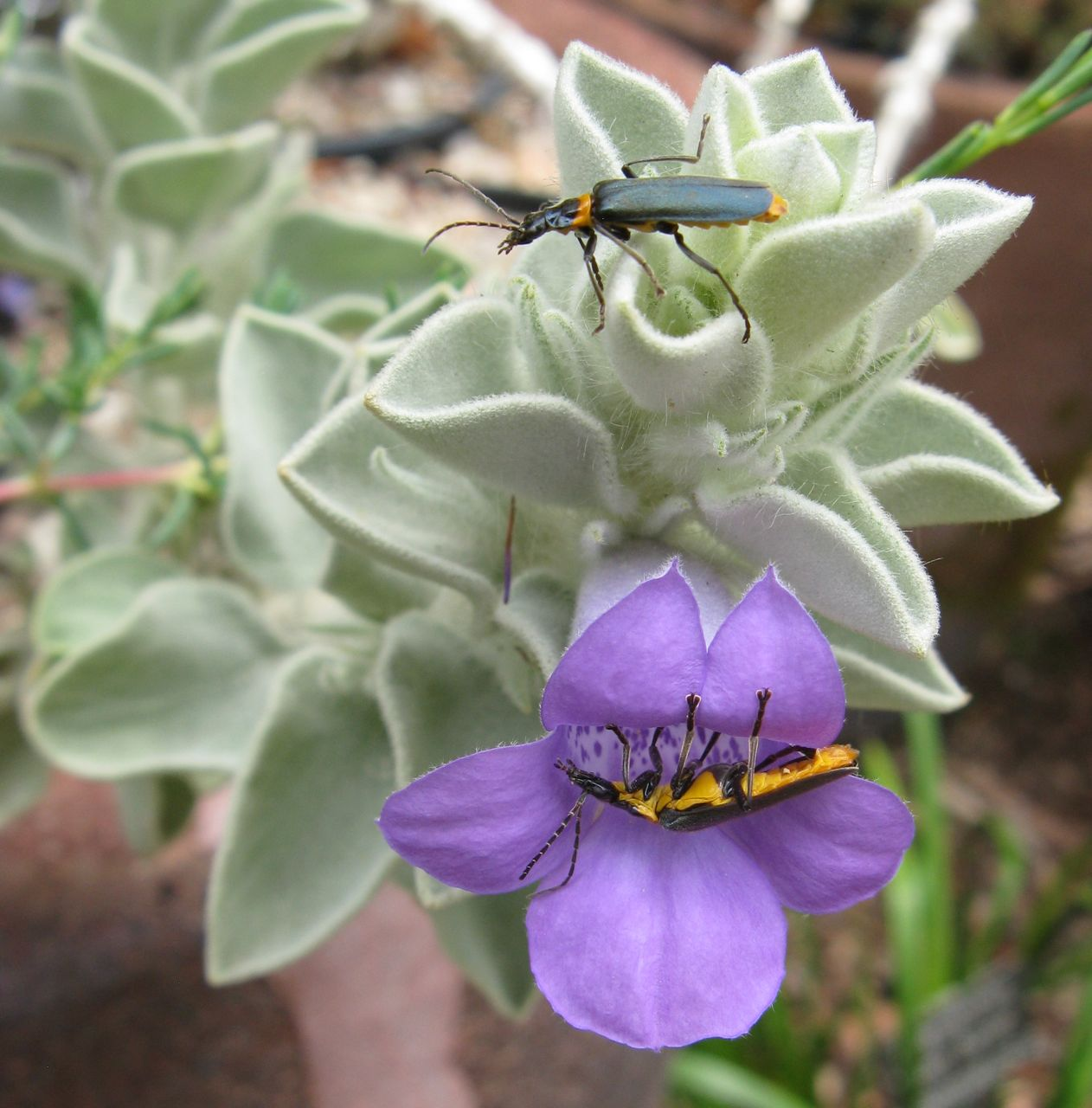

Conservation status
- Priority One — Poorly Known Taxa (DEC)

Scientific classification
- Kingdom: Plantae
- Clade: Tracheophytes
- Clade: Angiosperms
- Clade: Eudicots
- Clade: Asterids
- Order: Lamiales
- Family: Scrophulariaceae
- Genus: Eremophila
- Species: E. warnesii

Binomial name
- Eremophila warnesii Chinnock

= Eremophila warnesii =

Species of flowering plant

Eremophila warnesii is a flowering plant in the figwort family, Scrophulariaceae and is endemic to Western Australia. It is an erect, compact shrub with furry leaves, hairy sepals and blue to mauve petals. It is a little-known species, named after the founder of the Eremophila Study Group.

== Description ==
Eremophila warnesii is a compact, erect, sometimes spreading shrub which grows to a height of between 30 and 50 cm (10 and 20 in). Its branches and leaves are covered with a thick layer of fine white to silvery-grey branched hairs and simple hairs which are up to 5 mm (0.2 in)) long. The branches are rough due to persistent leaf bases. The leaves are arranged alternately along the branches and are thick, with a leaf blade which is egg-shaped, 12–30 mm (0.5–1 in) long and 10.5–22 mm (0.4–0.9 in) wide. The leaves have stalks which are mostly 3–6 mm (0.1–0.2 in) long.

The flowers are borne singly in leaf axils and lack a stalk. There are 5 linear sepals which are 10–15 mm (0.4–0.6 in) long, almost claw-like at the tip and covered with a thick layer of hairs similar to those on the leaves. The petals are 25–35 mm (0.98–1.4 in) long and are joined at their lower end to form a tube. The petal tube and its lobes are lilac-coloured to light purple or blue-mauve, with pale purple spots inside the tube. The outside of the tube and lobes is densely covered with branched hairs, the inside surface of the lobes is glabrous and the inside of the tube is densely woolly. The 4 stamens are fully enclosed in the petal tube. Flowering occurs between June and October and is followed by fruit which are cone-shaped to flask-shaped, 6–7 mm (0.2–0.3 in) long with a hairy covering.

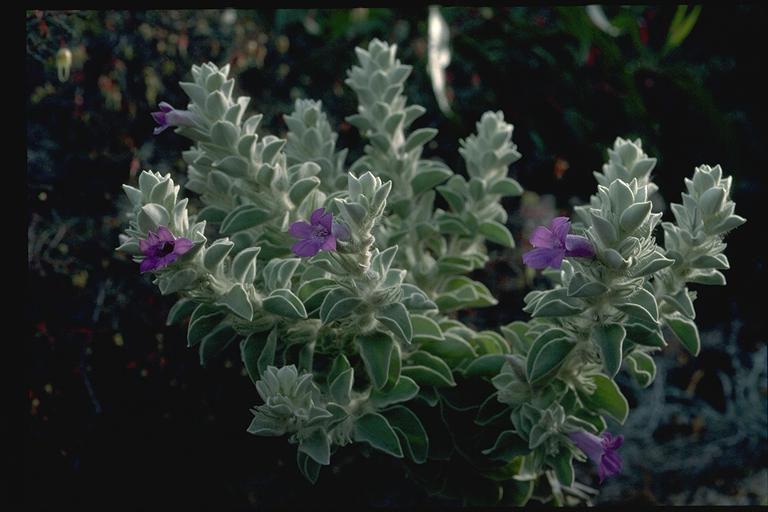
Eremophila warnesii growth habit

== Taxonomy and naming ==
The species was first formally described by Robert Chinnock in 2007 and the description was published in Eremophila and Allied Genera: A Monograph of the Plant Family Myoporaceae. The specific epithet (warnesii) honours Ken Warnes who founded the Eremophila Study Group associated with the Society for Growing Australian Plants (now Australian Native Plants Society (Australia).

== Distribution and habitat ==
This eremophila occurs near Mount Gould Station and Mount Clere Station north-west of Meekatharra in the Gascoyne and Murchison biogeographic regions where it grows in open mulga woodland.

== Conservation ==
Eremophila warnesii is classified as "Priority One" by the Western Australian Government Department of Parks and Wildlife, meaning that it is known from only one or a few locations which are potentially at risk.

== Use in horticulture ==
This eremophila has attractive silvery-grey foliage and large pale lilac to purple flowers. It is not widely cultivated but can be propagated from cuttings in summer or by grafting onto Myoporum rootstock. It grows best in well-drained soil in a sunny location and is tolerant of drought and of light frost.
