= Magniac =

Magniac is a surname, and may refer to:

- Magniac & Co. (1825), British trading company
- Charles Magniac (1827–1891), British financier and politician
- Hollingworth Magniac (1786–1867), British merchant and connoisseur of medieval art
- Meredith Magniac (1880–1917), British Army officer and cricketer
