= Bidgemia =

Pastoral lease in Western Australia

Coordinates: 25.041°S 115.309°E

Location in Western Australia

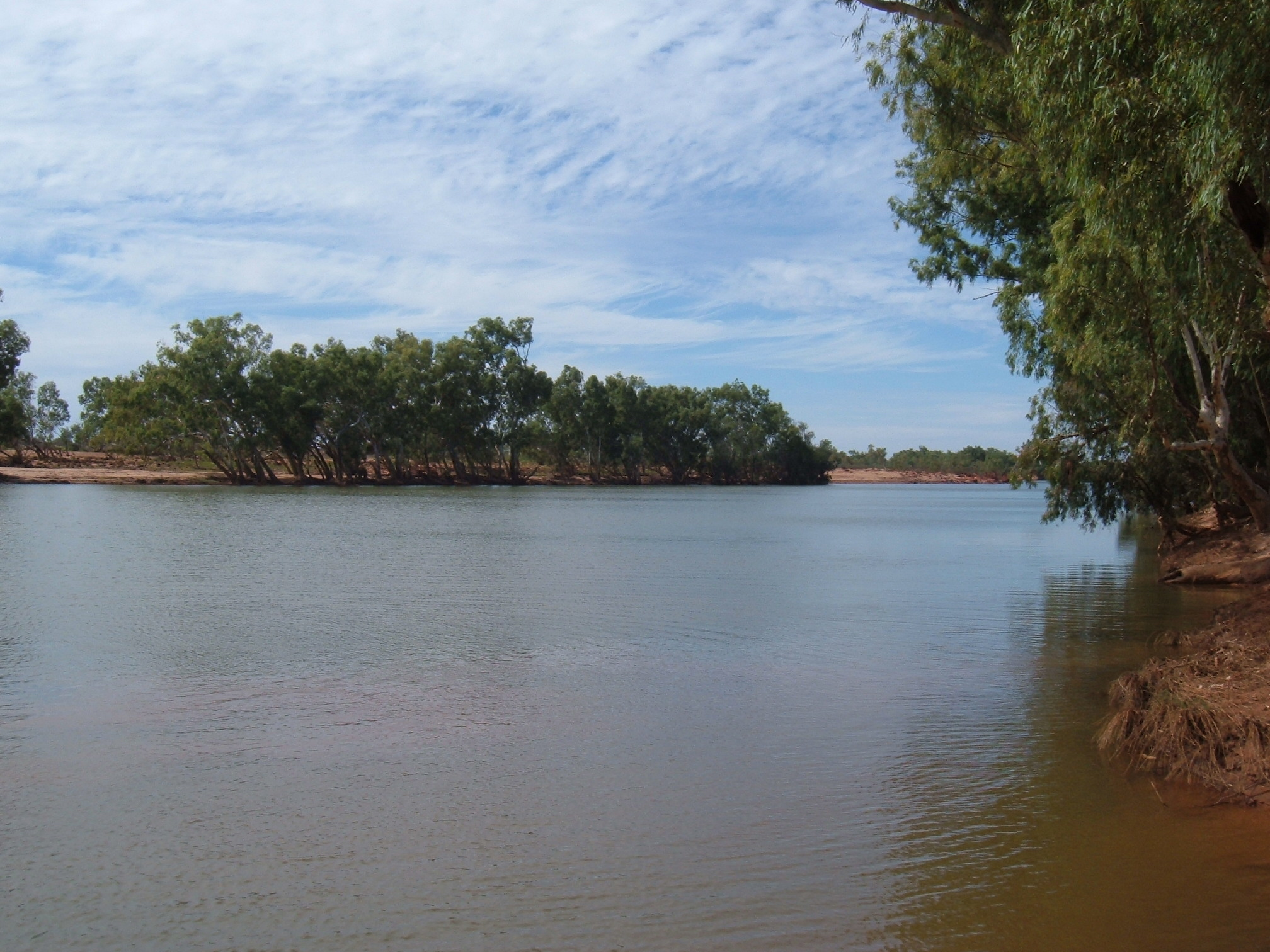
Rocky Pool – Gascoyne River

Bidgemia Station, commonly referred to as Bidgemia, is a pastoral lease that operates as a cattle station in Western Australia.

It is situated about 167 kilometres (104 mi) east of Carnarvon and 262 kilometres (163 mi) south east of Coral Bay in the Gascoyne region.

The property is currently owned and managed by Lachlan and Jane McTaggart, and has been owned by the family since 1947. Following a period of drought, the homestead was partially destroyed during the 2010 floods when the Gascoyne River rose over 10 metres (33 ft) above its normal levels. The floodwaters were over 2 metres (7 ft) above the record set in 1980 but still did not reach the homestead. The McTaggart family spent the night on a water tank waiting to be rescued.

Volunteers from the group BlazeAid helped clean up around the property in the months after the flooding, repairing fences and buildings.

Following expeditions through the area in 1879, Robert Edwin Bush took up leases and established a holding he named Pindandora Station in 1880. The local Aboriginal people referred to the area as Bidjia Mia, meaning place of the bidjie grub, and the station eventually took on the name Bidgemia. Bush set about expanding his holdings, acquiring over 1,000,000 acres (4,047 km^{2}), including Mount Clere Station and Erravilla. The area was struck by drought in the early 1900s and it took Bush some years to completely restock. In 1904 Bush left to live in England, leaving William Scott to manage the property. Scott left in 1912 when he acquired Mooloo Downs, leaving Bidgemia under the management of Bill Cream.

In 1924 over 66,000 sheep were shorn at Bidgemia. The following year 52,000 were cut out and shorn producing 1,000 bales of wool.

== See also ==
- List of pastoral leases in Western Australia
