= Bertrand Hallward =

British educationalist

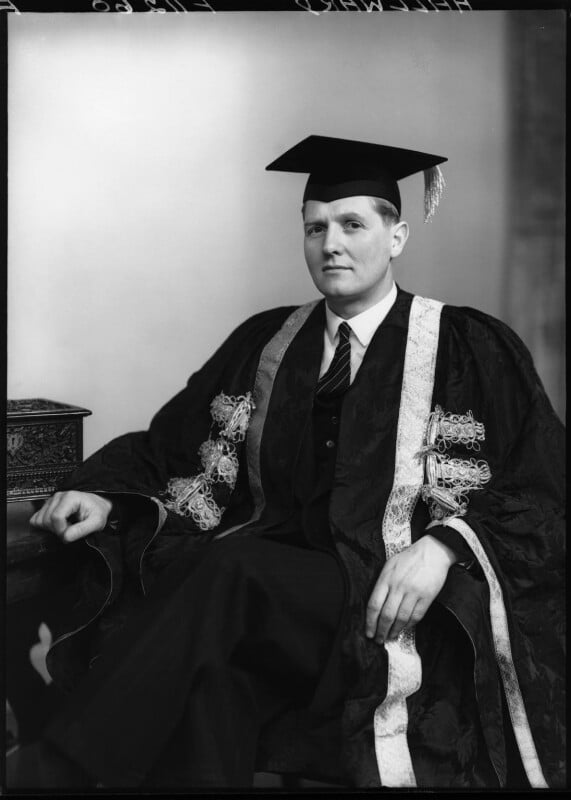
Hallward in 1949

Bertrand Leslie Hallward (24 May 1901 – 17 November 2003) was a British educationalist who served as Headmaster of Clifton College and Vice-Chancellor of the University of Nottingham.

== Family and education ==
Hallward was born in Hove, Sussex, to Norman Hallward, who worked for the Indian Civil Service, and Eva Gurdon, the daughter of an Indian Army officer. Among his paternal ancestors were several Anglican clergymen, and on his mother's side he was the nephew of Bertrand Evelyn Mellish Gurdon.

He was a pupil at Warden House in Deal, Kent, and at Haileybury College, and later an undergraduate at King's College, Cambridge. After two terms teaching at Harrow School he returned to Cambridge as a fellow of Peterhouse, where he quickly developed an interest in academic administration.

In 1926 he married Margaret Tait (1900–1991), the daughter of the Rev. Arthur Tait, Principal of Ridley Hall, Cambridge, and granddaughter of the Rt. Rev. Thomas Drury, Master of St Catharine's College, Cambridge. Bertrand and Margaret had four daughters together.

== Academic career ==
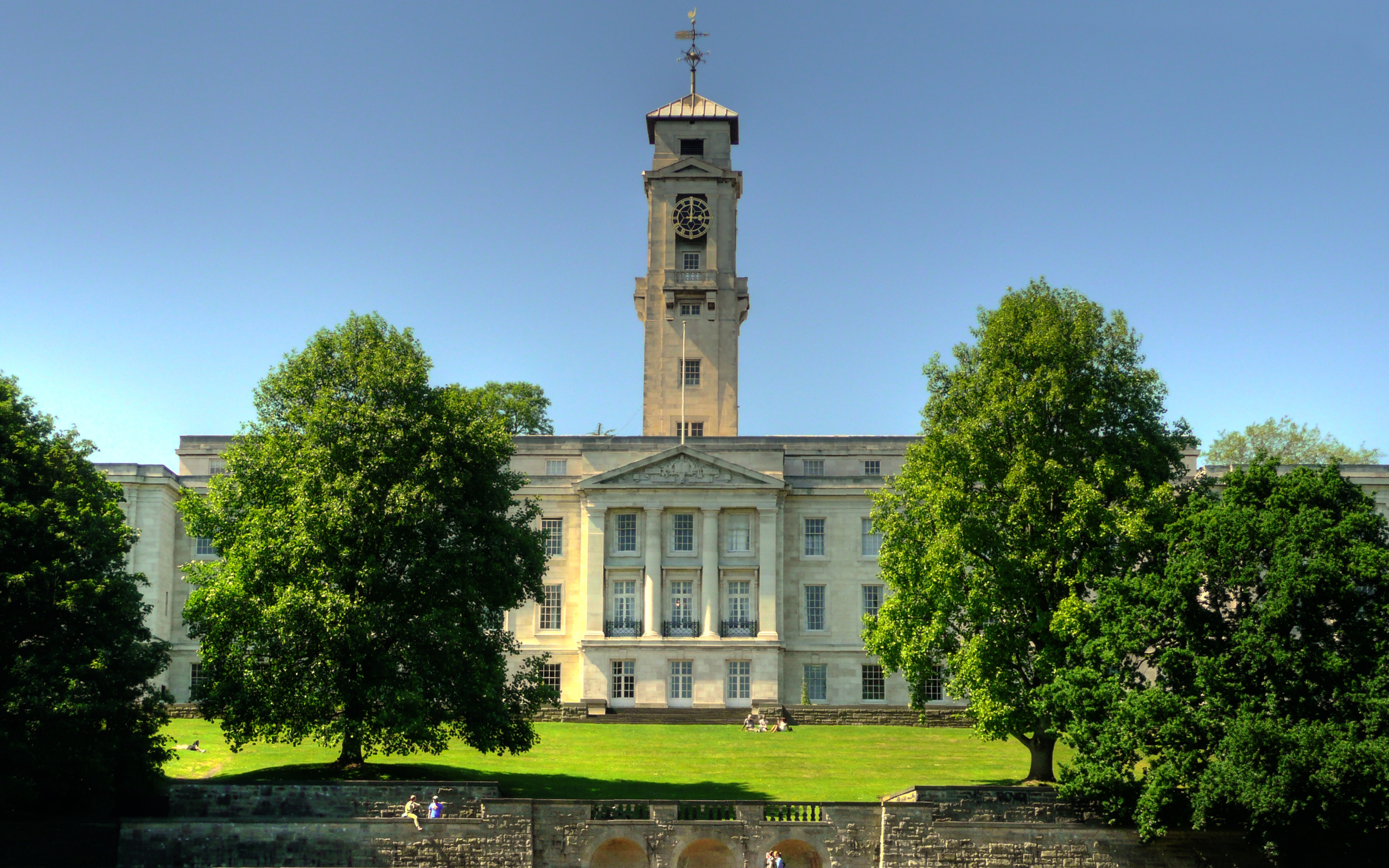
The Trent Building on the University of Nottingham campus; Hallward was the University's first Vice-Chancellor, from 1948 to 1965.

=== Clifton College ===
Having unsuccessfully applied for the headmastership of Felsted School in 1931, Hallward was offered the position of Headmaster of Clifton College in Bristol in 1939. After a bomb hit the school, he moved the pupils to Bude in Cornwall for the remainder of the Second World War. Returning to Bristol, he set about increasing enrollment and improving the quality of the staff.

=== University of Nottingham ===
In 1947, after declining an offer from Charterhouse School, Hallward applied to become principal of University College, Nottingham, which, when his term began the following year, had received full university status. He immediately began enlarging and developing the campus from 122 to 400 acres and enhancing the quality of teaching. He retired from the University of Nottingham in 1965.

== Other interests and later life ==
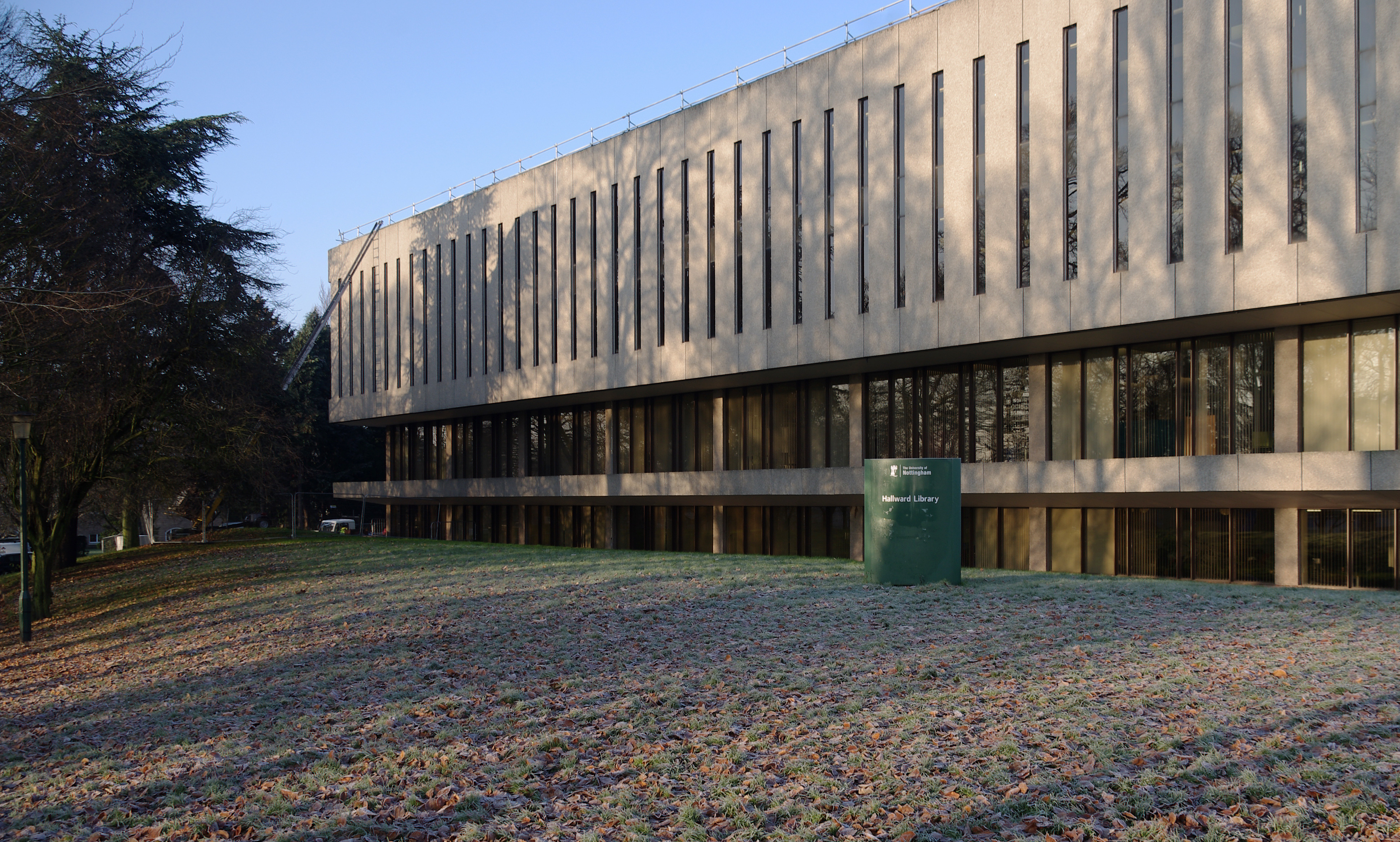
The Hallward Library at the University of Nottingham, opened in 1972 and named after Hallward.

Hallward served as chairman of the Nottingham Playhouse for 15 years. On retirement, he built an ocean-going yacht, sailing around the Mediterranean Sea during the summer months.

He celebrated his 100th birthday at Peterhouse in 2001 and died in 2003, at the age of 102.

The Hallward Library, opened in 1972, at the University of Nottingham was named after him and, after his death, a girls' boarding house at Clifton College was established and named after him (Hallward's House).

Academic offices
Preceded by Norman Whatley	Headmaster of Clifton College; 1938–1948	Succeeded by Henry Desmond Pritchard Lee
Preceded by New creation	Vice-Chancellor of the University of Nottingham; 1948–1965	Succeeded by Frederick Dainton
