= John Edward King =

British education administrator (1858–1939)

John Edward King (10 July 1858 – 21 March 1939) was an author, Fellow and Tutor of Lincoln College, Oxford, High Master of Manchester Grammar School, Headmaster of Bedford School, and Headmaster of Clifton College.

== Biography ==
Born in Ash, South Somerset, on 10 July 1858, John Edward King was educated at Clifton College and at Lincoln College, Oxford, where he was elected as a Fellow in 1882. He was assistant master at St Paul's School, between 1884 and 1887, tutor at Lincoln College, Oxford, between 1887 and 1891, high master of Manchester Grammar School, between 1891 and 1903. He was elected to membership of the Manchester Literary and Philosophical Society on 1 December1891, and become headmaster of Bedford School, between 1903 and 1910, and headmaster of Clifton College, between 1910 and 1923.

John Edward King died in Chilton Polden, Somerset, on 21 March 1939.

== Publications ==
- The Principles of Sound and Inflexion, as Illustrated in the Greek and Latin Languages, Oxford University Press, 1888
- Comparative Grammar of Greek and Latin, Oxford University Press, 1890
- Cicero, Tusculans, Loeb Classical Library, 1927
- Bede's Ecclesiastical History, Loeb Classical Library, 1930
- Inventory of Parochial Documents in the Diocese of Bath and Wells and the County of Somerset, 1938

Academic offices
Preceded by Michael George Glazebrook	High Masters of Manchester Grammar School; 1891–1903	Succeeded by John Lewis Paton
Preceded by James Surtees Phillpotts	Headmaster of Bedford School; 1903–1910	Succeeded by Reginald Carter
Preceded by Albert David	Headmaster of Clifton College; 1910–1923	Succeeded by Norman Whatley
