= John Whitty (cricketer) =

Australian-born English cricketer and British Army officer

Personal information
- Full name: John Henry Hamlyn Whitty
- Born: 4 February 1910; Sydney, New South Wales, Australia
- Died: 23 October 1944 (aged 34); Vicchio, Tuscany, Italy
- Batting: Right-handed
- Bowling: Right-arm

Career statistics
Competition	First-class
Matches	1
Runs scored	23
Batting average	11.50
100s/50s	0/0
Top score	22
Balls bowled	126
Wickets	4
Bowling average	11.50
5 wickets in innings	0
10 wickets in match	0
Best bowling	2/19
Catches/stumpings	0/–
- Source: Cricinfo, 23 May 2019

John Henry Hamlyn Whitty DSO MC (4 February 1910 – 23 October 1944) was an Australian-born English first-class cricketer and British Army officer. Enlisting in the Queen's Own Royal West Kent Regiment in 1931, Whitty served with the regiment during the 1936–1939 Arab Revolt, during which he was awarded the Military Cross. He later served during the Second World War, during which he was wounded in action at Dunkirk. Later in the war he served in North Africa, where he was considered by Field Marshal Montgomery as the best field commander in the Eighth Army. Following service in North Africa, Whitty fought in the Italian Campaign, during which he was awarded the Distinguished Service Order, before being killed in October 1944 after stepping on a landmine. During his military career, he also played first-class cricket for the British Army cricket team.

== Early life ==
Whitty was born in Sydney to Hamlyn Henry Whitty and his wife, Marguerite. In December 1922 he moved with his parents to England, where he was educated at Clifton College. While at Clifton he was a member of the Clifton College contingent of the Officers' Training Corps.

== Military career ==
After leaving Clifton, he decided upon a career in the British Army, but was placed on the Supplementary Reserve, where he held the rank of second lieutenant.

He accepted a commission into the Queen's Own Royal West Kent Regiment as a lieutenant in February 1931, having been on the Supplementary Reserve. In 1936, he made a single appearance in first-class cricket for the British Army cricket team against Cambridge University at Fenner's. Batting twice in the match, he was dismissed for a single run by John Cameron, while in their second innings he was dismissed by the same bowler for 22. With the ball, he dismissed Allan White and John Pawle in the Cambridge first innings, taking figures of 2 for 19, while in their second innings he dismissed Norman Yardley and Hugh Bartlett, taking figures of 2 for 27. An all-round sportsman, beside playing cricket for the army, he also football, golf and rugby union for the army. He married Sheila Hope in 1937, with the couple having two children and residing at Seaford, Sussex.

He was posted to Palestine on peacekeeping duties in 1938 and saw action there during the Arab Revolt. On 14 May 1938, he was slightly injured in a car accident during a night advance on Tamra. Despite this, he remained on the front line and led an advance during the early afternoon on the same day. When he received word that a private was missing, Whitty, alongside Captain Kelleher and Private Parkin, searched for the missing private under heavy enemy fire and eventually found him, returning him safely to cover. For these actions he was awarded the Military Cross in August 1938. He was promoted to the rank of captain in February 1939.

At the outbreak of the Second World War, Whitty was sent to France with the British Expeditionary Force, as part of the 132nd Infantry Brigade. During the retreat to Dunkirk, he was wounded in the chest and shoulder. Shortly thereafter he was picked up by an ambulance and taken to a makeshift hospital in Dunkirk, before being evacuated to a hospital ship and returned to England, where he spent 21 days recovering from his wounds in hospital at Dover. Upon recovering, he returned to service and was later sent to North Africa, where he took part in the Battle of El Alamein. During his service in North Africa he was placed in command of the 5th (Territorial Battalion) within the West Kent Regiment, at which point he was promoted to the temporary rank of lieutenant colonel. He was described by Field Marshal Montgomery as "the best field commander in the Eighth Army".

After North Africa, Whitty received further training, before taking part in the Italian Campaign. Within one month of being posted to Italy, he was awarded the Distinguished Service Order during an attack on Romagnoli in November 1943, in which he led from the front while being exposed to significant enemy fire.

Whitty was killed on 23 October 1944 when he stepped on a mine in the Italian town of Vicchio. He was buried at the Florence War Cemetery. Whitty was survived by his wife and their two children.
