= Adhurst =

Hamlet in Hampshire, England

Coordinates: 51.017706°N 0.912181°W

Adhurst St Mary
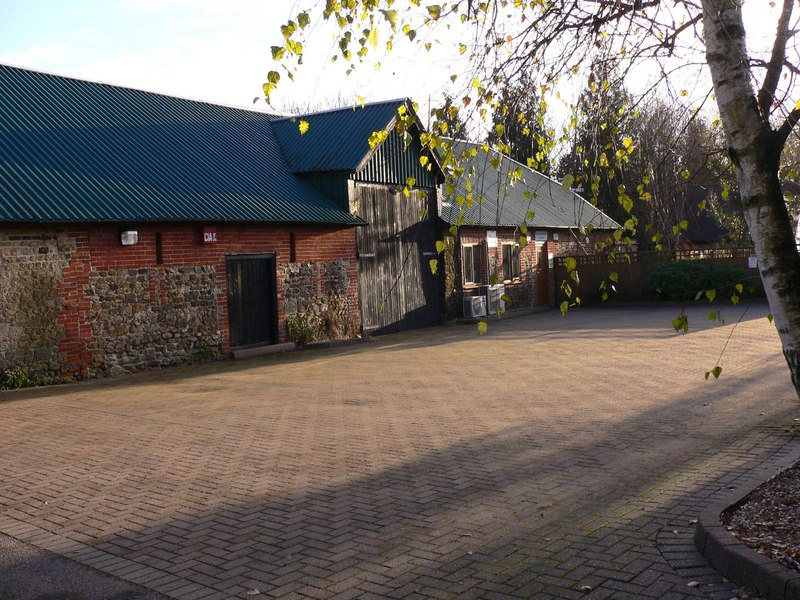
- Upper Adhurst Industrial Park

- Location within Hampshire
- OS grid reference: SU764248
- Civil parish: Steep
- District: East Hampshire
- Shire county: Hampshire
- Region: South East
- Country: England
- Sovereign state: United Kingdom
- Post town: PETERSFIELD
- Postcode district: GU31
- Dialling code: 01730
- Police: Hampshire and Isle of Wight
- Fire: Hampshire and Isle of Wight
- Ambulance: South Central
- UK Parliament: Petersfield

Adhurst (also known as Adhurst St Mary) is a hamlet in Hampshire, England. The settlement is within the civil parish of Steep, and is located approximately 1.3 miles (2.1 km) north-east of Petersfield.

Adhust St Mary is a Grade II Listed 19th century Mansion, now converted into flats. It was commissioned by John Bonham Carter II and his wife Laura in 1857. The first-class cricketer and businessman Lothian Bonham-Carter was born in the hamlet in 1858.
