= Konstantin Kisin =

British comedian and podcaster (born 1982)

- Kisin in 2025
- Born: Konstantin Vadimovich Kisin; 25 December 1982 (age 43); Moscow, Soviet Union
- Education: University of Edinburgh (dropped out)
- Occupations: Podcaster; political commentator; writer; comedian (formerly); translator (formerly)
- Notable work: Triggernometry podcast An Immigrant's Love Letter to the West (2022)
- Spouse: Alina Kisina (m. 2003)
- Children: 2

Substack information
- Newsletter: konstantinkisin.substack.com
- Subscribers: 87 thousand

YouTube information
- Channel: Triggernometry
- Years active: 2018–present
- Subscribers: 1.82 million
- Views: 478 million
- Last updated: 1 July 2026
- Website: www.konstantinkisin.com

Konstantin Vadimovich Kisin (/ˈkɪsɪn/; Russian: Константин Вадимович Кисин; born 25 December 1982) is a Soviet-born British political commentator, author and co-host of the Triggernometry podcast. He is also a former translator and stand-up comedian.

Kisin has written for a number of publications, including Quillette, The Spectator, The Daily Telegraph and Standpoint; he has also appeared on the panel of the BBC political programme Question Time and has been interviewed on TV media such as the BBC, Sky News and GB News. He speaks and writes on a wide variety of issues, often relating to tech censorship, comedy and culture war.

== Early life, family and education ==
Kisin is the eldest of three children born in Moscow in the Soviet Union to parents Marina and Vadim. He has Russian, Ukrainian, Greek and Jewish ancestry. He has described himself as "a not-very-practicing Orthodox Christian".

At the age of 11, Konstantin Kisin was sent to the United Kingdom alone to attend Clifton College boarding school, where he was picked on for not speaking English. He subsequently attended Edinburgh University, leaving around a year short of finishing a degree.

== Career ==
=== Translation and interpreting ===
Kisin has worked as a Russian-English legal, financial and video game translator, and interpreter, and has regularly given talks about the business side of translation.

=== Podcasting ===
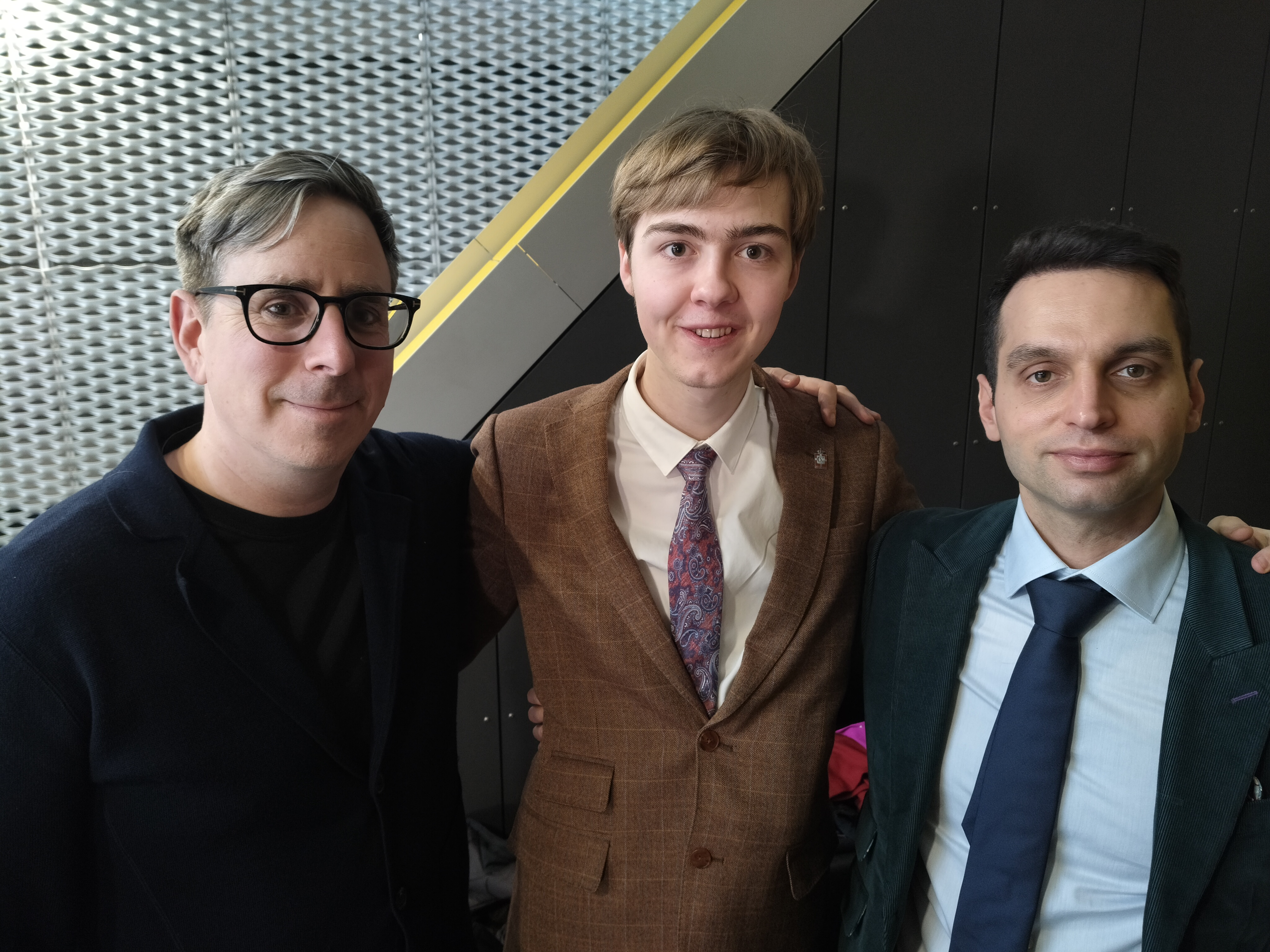
Kisin with Francis Foster (to the left) at ARC 2025 in London

Since April 2018, Kisin has been co-presenter with Francis Foster of Triggernometry, a YouTube channel and podcast. The primary format of the show is the prerecorded interview; the show brands itself as holding "honest conversations with fascinating people", and has been described as "anti-woke" by The Times. Guests have included Nigel Farage, Jordan Peterson, Ben Shapiro, Stephen Fry, Sam Harris, Deborah Frances-White, Piers Morgan, Tommy Robinson, Hasan Piker and Prime Minister of Israel Benjamin Netanyahu.

A 2023 interview with Neil deGrasse Tyson on the subject of "Have We Lost Trust in Science?" was widely reported upon both by other YouTube channels and the mainstream media because of Tyson's statements on the subject of transgender rights.

=== Stand-up comedy ===
In 2019 Kisin took his show Orwell That Ends Well to the Edinburgh Festival Fringe to mixed reviews. The Daily Telegraph included the show in its list of best comedy shows of the Edinburgh Festival, The Student described it as "hilarious and refreshing", while Fest Magazine called it "ill-considered, reactionary nonsense", and The Jewish Chronicle described Kisin as an "antagonist" and rated the show 2 out of 5.

==== Dispute with SOAS student group ====
In 2018, Kisin made headlines when he refused to sign a "behavioural agreement" form explaining a "no tolerance policy" concerning racism, sexism, classism, ageism, homophobia, biphobia, xenophobia, Islamophobia, anti-religion, and anti-atheism, when asked to perform, free of charge, at a fundraising gig for UNICEF at the School of Oriental and African Studies (SOAS), University of London. The form explained those topics were not banned, but stated the topics should be discussed in a "respectful and non-abusive way", and presented in a way that is "respectful and kind".

After Kisin refused to agree to those terms and chose not to perform, the UNICEF on Campus society at SOAS apologised and clarified they did not wish to "impose that guests would have to agree to anything they do not believe in". The SOAS Students' Union said it did not require external speakers to sign any contract before appearances, and that the UNICEF on Campus society had been "overzealous" in interpreting the guidelines.

After it was claimed that Kisin had agreed to similar restrictions for a different gig in 2017, he stated he was "absolutely certain there was nothing about religion, atheism, respect or kindness in the rules [of the 2017 contract]. Had there been, I would not have agreed."

=== Author ===
Kisin is the author of An Immigrant's Love Letter to the West, which became a Sunday Times bestseller in the first week of its publication. A review in The Daily Telegraph in July 2022 had Douglas Murray writing: "Kisin has written a lively and spirited book defending the society he is grateful to have found himself in. If I can return the compliment, we are lucky to have him."

== Views ==
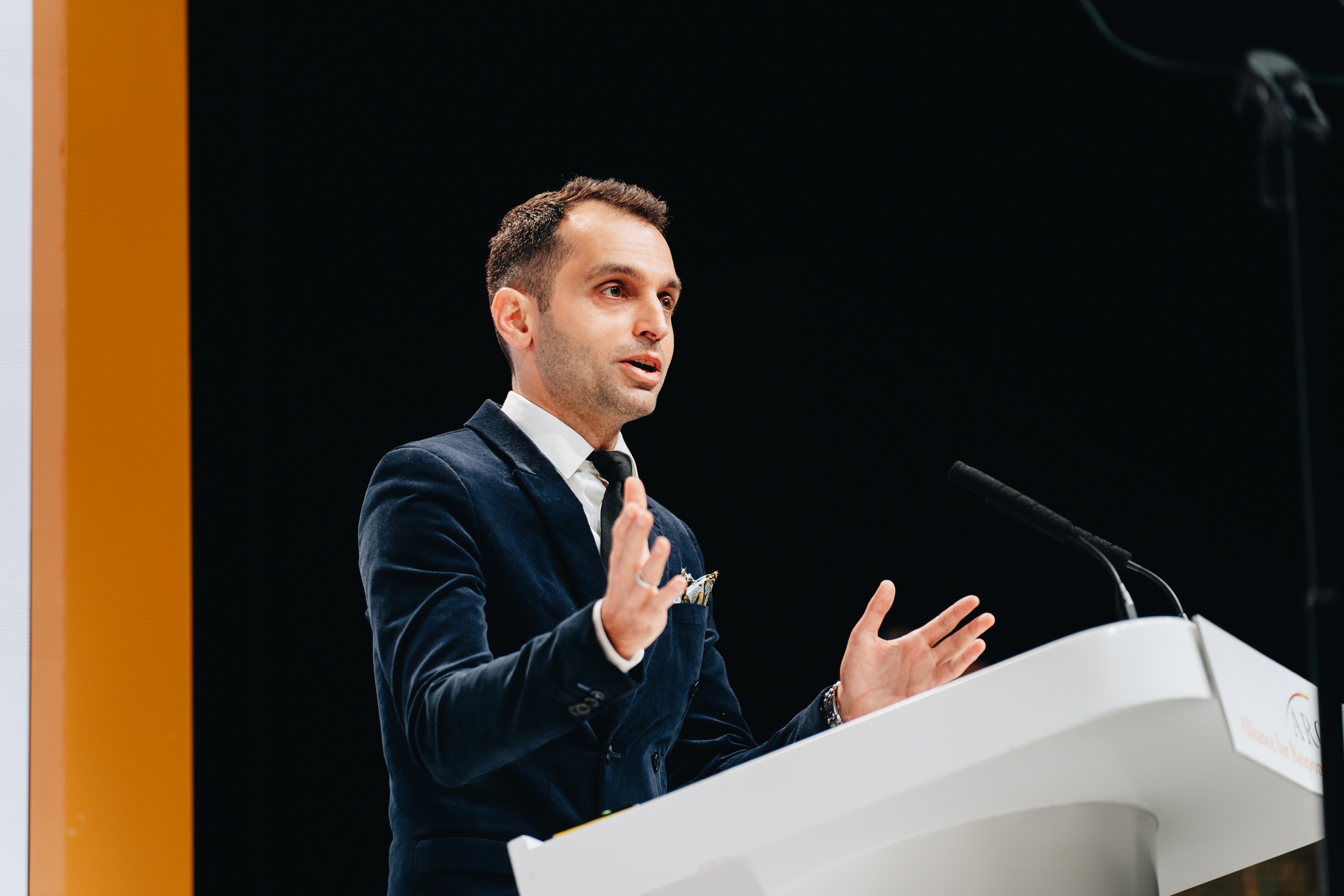
Konstantin Kisin speaking at Alliance for Responsible Citizenship 2023 in Greenwich, London, UK, 31 October 2023

In March 2022 Kisin appeared as a panellist on the first edition of BBC Question Time following the Russian invasion of Ukraine, where he described feeling shame for his birth country Russia and discussed the bombardment that his family in Ukraine was undergoing.

Kisin's 2023 speech at the Oxford Union student debating society in favour of the motion that "Woke Culture HAS Gone Too Far" went viral. In the speech, Kisin asserted that "woke culture" stifles free speech, and that reducing climate change was incompatible with reducing poverty in poorer countries. An article by Will Lloyd in the New Statesman praised Kisin's speech as "not banal, not weighed down by predictable culture-war talking points", but concluded that "[a]way from his targets, Kisin’s observations on politics and history are relatively banal".

Writing for The Spectator in 2019, Kisin criticised the use of the term "right-wing" as a "smear for those we disagree with", and described himself as a "Remainer with liberal and centrist views who has only voted Lib Dem or Labour". In September 2023, the New Statesman named him as the 46th most influential right-wing figure in British politics. Kisin welcomed the election of Donald Trump in 2024, and in 2026, told The Daily Telegraph: "In terms of the people who are addressing the huge challenges I'm talking about, of course Reform are the only ones really doing it properly."

In a keynote speech in London in late 2023 at the Alliance for Responsible Citizenship, Kisin argued that the moment for restoring Western civilisation is at hand, describing it as "the fight for our lives". Kisin has described the UK as experiencing "major decline", and asserts that UK GDP per capita is lower than it was in 2007. In April 2026, he wrote: "As I keep saying over and over, Britain's GDP per capita is lower today than it was in 2007, before the Great Financial Crisis."

In February 2025, Kisin interviewed Fraser Nelson on his Triggernometry podcast. During the interview, Nelson discussed Rishi Sunak and said "He is absolutely English – he was born and bred here". Kisin responded by saying "He's a brown Hindu; how is he English?" before stating that he himself as a Russian immigrant could similarly never be English, nor could his British-born son. Kisin's remarks drew controversy, and were criticised by Sangita Myska, Dan Hodges, and David Aaronovitch. Kisin insisted he was making a distinction between British nationality and English ethnicity, which Nelson later described as a "perfectly fair point". Sunder Katwala rejected Kisin's definition of Englishness, noting that it would exclude English sportsmen like Jude Bellingham and Moeen Ali from being English. Polling from March 2025 found that 75% of English people believe that someone can be English regardless of their skin colour or ethnic background. Rishi Sunak affirmed that he does consider himself English, and described the affair as "ridiculous". In 2026, Reform leader Nigel Farage said that he did not want to draw "ethnic lines" on what being English is.

== Personal life ==
In 2003, Kisin married Alina. Their first son was born in May 2022. The couple welcomed a second son in spring 2026.

== Bibliography ==
- An Immigrant's Love Letter to the West (2022)
