= An Immigrant's Love Letter to the West =

2022 book by Konstantin Kisin

- Author: Konstantin Kisin
- Audio read by: Konstantin Kisin
- Language: English
- Published: 14 July 2022
- Publisher: Constable
- Pages: 210
- Awards: Sunday Times bestseller list
- ISBN: 9781408716045

An Immigrant's Love Letter to the West is a 2022 non-fiction book written by British comedian and political commentator Konstantin Kisin. The book became a Sunday Times bestseller in the first week of its publication.

== Content ==
The book sets out to discuss themes including free speech and cancel culture through the perspective of a non-Western immigrant. It particularly addresses why the West has a negative view of itself, and why that is self-destructive.

One of the themes of the book is the history of slavery and the way it is taught in American schools. By talking about the life of his great grandfather as a serf in the Russian Empire, the Soviet gulags, Barbary corsairs and slavery in African kingdoms Kisin pushes back against the notion that slavery was unique to the West and makes a case that slavery in Africa long predated the Atlantic slave trade.

Kisin also draws parallels between the dismissal and ostracisation of his physicist grandfather and his family for criticising the Soviet Union's 1979 invasion of Afghanistan and the treatment of people who publicly express the view that there are only two sexes in modern-day Western liberal democracies, cautioning of the tendency for this type of authoritarianism to get worse, not better.

== Reception ==
The Daily Telegraph praised it as a "lively and spirited book" giving it 5 stars out of 5.

Australian politician and commentator John Anderson expressed that "several sections should be required reading for all switched-on citizens", highlighting the book's section on why people have lost trust in institutions as "a tour de force" and "worth the price of the book" and described the book as "an especially ideal read for young people" because of its "very engaging and non-technical style".
