= Thomas Stubbs (cricketer, born 1856) =

English cricketer and clergyman

Personal information
- Full name: Thomas Walker Stubbs
- Born: 11 September 1856; Ashton upon Mersey, Cheshire, England
- Died: 5 June 1899 (aged 42); Stow-on-the-Wold, Gloucestershire, England
- Batting: Right-handed
- Bowling: Right-arm roundarm fast

Domestic team information
- Years: Team
- 1877: Oxford University

Career statistics
Competition	First-class
Matches	1
Runs scored	1
Batting average	1.00
100s/50s	–/–
Top score	1
Balls bowled	76
Wickets	3
Bowling average	13.66
5 wickets in innings	–
10 wickets in match	–
Best bowling	2/26
Catches/stumpings	–/–
- Source: Cricinfo, 29 March 2020

Thomas Walker Stubbs (11 September 1856 – 5 June 1899) was an English first-class cricketer and clergyman.

The son of Henry James Laurie Stubbs, he was born in September 1856 at Ashton upon Mersey, then in Cheshire. He was educated at Clifton College, before going up to Magdalen College, Oxford. While studying at Oxford, he made a single appearance in first-class cricket for Oxford University against Middlesex at Lord's in 1877. One of five Old Cliftonians to feature in the Oxford side that year, Stubbs batted once in the match and was dismissed for a single run in the Oxford first-innings by Alfred Stratford. With his right-arm roundarm fast bowling, he took the wicket of Augustus Nepean in the Middlesex first-innings, and followed this up by taking the wickets of Nepean and Stratford in their second-innings, to finish with match figures of 3 for 41.

He married Evelyn Risley at Stow-on-the-Wold in 1878, with future Jack the Ripper suspect Montague Druitt among the attendees. Stubbs died at Stow-on-the-Wold in June 1899.
