= Thomas Penny (cricketer) =

English cricketer

Personal information
- Full name: Thomas Simpson Penny
- Born: 15 July 1929; Bristol, England
- Died: 26 July 1983 (aged 54); Casterton, Cumberland, England
- Batting: Right-handed
- Bowling: Right-arm off break

Domestic team information
- Years: Team
- 1951–1952: Oxford University

Career statistics
Competition	First-class
Matches	5
Runs scored	73
Batting average	24.33
100s/50s	–/–
Top score	34
Balls bowled	858
Wickets	11
Bowling average	36.36
5 wickets in innings	–
10 wickets in match	–
Best bowling	4/75
Catches/stumpings	1/–
- Source: Cricinfo, 23 March 2020

Thomas Simpson Penny (15 July 1929 – 26 July 1983) was an English first-class cricketer.

Penny was born at Bristol in July 1929. He was educated at Clifton College, before going up to Magdalen College, Oxford. While studying at Oxford, he played first-class cricket for Oxford University in 1951 and 1952, making five appearances. He scored 73 runs in his five matches, with a high score of 34. With his right-arm off break bowling, he took 11 wickets at an average of 36.36 and best figures of 4 for 75. After graduating from Oxford, Penny became a schoolteacher, teaching at Canford School amongst others. He died in July 1983 at Casterton, Cumberland.
