= Rowland Raw =

English cricketer and British Army officer

Personal information
- Full name: Rowland Raw
- Born: 16 July 1884; Pietermaritzburg, Colony of Natal
- Died: 7 August 1915 (aged 31); Suvla, Gallipoli, Ottoman Turkey
- Batting: Right-handed

Career statistics
Competition	First-class
Matches	2
Runs scored	48
Batting average	24.00
100s/50s	0/0
Top score	47
Catches/stumpings	0/–
- Source: Cricinfo, 22 June 2019

Rowland Raw (16 July 1884 – 7 August 1915) was an English first-class cricketer and British Army officer.

Raw was born at Pietermaritzburg in the Colony of Natal to George and Edith Raw. He was educated in England at Clifton College, before going up to Trinity College, Cambridge, though he did not represent the university in cricket. He made his debut in first-class cricket for the Gentlemen of England when he played two matches against Cambridge University at Crystal Palace in June 1905. He scored 48 runs across his two matches, with a high score of 47. After leaving Cambridge he married Mary Raw of Witley, Surrey. He served in the First World War with the Lancashire Fusiliers, being commissioned as a second lieutenant in December 1914. He sailed from Liverpool in July 1915 to take part in the Gallipoli Campaign, where he was killed in action at Suvla on 7 August 1915. He was buried at the Hill 10 Cemetery.
