= Norman Whatley =

English educationalist

Mayor of Oxford
- In office 1949–1950
- Preceded by: James William Heading
- Succeeded by: Florence Mary Andrews

Headmaster of Clifton College
- In office 1949–1950
- Preceded by: John Edward King
- Succeeded by: Bertrand Hallward

Personal details
- Born: 8 September 1884
- Died: 1 April 1965 (aged 80)

Norman Whatley (8 September 1884 – 1 April 1965) was an English educationalist, headmaster of Clifton College from 1923-1939, and also a historian, Fellow of Hertford College, Oxford. He served during the First World War. He was Mayor of Oxford 1949-1950. He was editor of The Isis Magazine, 1904–1905.

Academic offices
Preceded by John Edward King	Headmaster of Clifton College; 1923–1938	Succeeded by Bertrand Hallward
