= Stephen Spurr =

English educationalist (born 1953)

Headmaster, Westminster School
- In office 2005–2014

Headmaster, Clifton College
- In office 2000–2005

Master, House Master, Head of Classics Eton College
- In office 1984–2000

Personal details
- Born: 1953 (age 72–73)
- Education: The King's School, Canterbury
- Alma mater: University of Oxford

Stephen Spurr (born 9 October 1953) is a British teacher, classicist, and academic as well as Chairman & Director of Education of Intellego Education, a family of schools backed by H.I.G. Capital.

From 2014 to August 2019, he was the Global Education Director of Inspired, an international education network of more than 60 K–12 schools on five continents.

From 2005 to 2014, he was the Head Master of Westminster School. Throughout his tenure, Westminster topped the FT academic league tables, combining A-level and GCSE results. While at Westminster, he chaired the Independent Schools Examination Board.

Prior to that, he was headmaster of Clifton College (2000–2005), and House Master and Head of Classics at Eton College (1984–2000). Before Eton, he was a university academic, lecturing on Greek and Roman literature, history and archaeology.

== Education ==
Spurr was educated at The King's School, Canterbury, and Sydney Grammar School. He studied classics at the Universities of Sydney and Oxford, culminating in a DPhil degree in Ancient History from Oxford. He was awarded a postgraduate fellowship at Harvard University, the Ancient History Prize and Cooper and Pelham Scholarships at Oxford, and a Rome Scholarship at the British School at Rome.

== Views ==
In 2004, Spurr stated that A-level exams may fail talented pupils, especially in the humanities; Westminster consequently switched to Cambridge Pre-U exams in nine subjects, which he described as "so much more stimulating to teach and learn" and much better preparation for study at university. He has also always been a great proponent of scientific education. In another two subjects, his Westminster pupils followed International A-levels, which, together with the Pre-Us, enable comparison with the best schools world-wide, since Spurr aims to educate pupils not only for a successful entrance to top ranked universities but also to become engaged global citizens of the future. While working for Inspired, he also came to appreciate the value of the IB curriculum. From 2006 to 2013, Spurr was the Chairman of ISEB, the board that produces and regulates the Common Entrance examination, with emphasis on breadth of knowledge, academic integrity, and rigour. According to Tatler, Spurr also believes in academic research for its own intrinsic sake.

At Eton, Clifton and Westminster, he consistently looked to identify and encourage academically ambitious pupils in the state sector, through extensive fund-raising for bursary programmes and by establishing the Eton–Harlesden Summer School in 1986 and the Clifton Summer School in 2001, and, in his last year as head master at Westminster, he set up the Harris-Westminster Sixth Form Academy, a joint project between Westminster School and the Harris Federation, which opened in 2014 and was judged Outstanding in its first Inspection by Ofsted.

He has always considered that British education needs to take careful notice of the best international standards. This is a theme on which he has given talks in the UK, Italy, Singapore, the US and China – where he linked Westminster school with Beijing No 4, one of the top academic schools in Beijing. Developing his belief in the growing importance of international education, on leaving Westminster he joined Inspired as Group Education Director in September 2014 helping the company to grow successfully from its original base of four schools in South Africa to (when he retired from Inspired to set up his own consultancy in August 2019) 64 schools and 46,000 students on five continents. He is a governor of the Royal Ballet School and of Tonbridge School. As an independent educational consultant, he speaks and advises regularly on the future of education, combining the best of traditional British pedagogy with the highest international standards and the latest advances in digital learning.

== Personal life ==
In 1982, Spurr married Susanna Armani in Rome, and they have a son and a daughter.

== Scholarship ==
In addition to articles, interviews and talks on education, and to scholarly books and articles, particularly in Latin literature and Roman History, and publications in the field of Egyptology (while at Eton he was also curator of the Myers Museum of Ancient Egyptian Art), Spurr is known as a translator of Italian, and was awarded a Times Literary translation prize in 1991.
