= Lothian Bonham-Carter =

English cricketer

Personal information
- Full name: Lothian George Bonham-Carter
- Born: 29 September 1858; Adhurst St Mary, Hampshire, England
- Died: 13 January 1927 (aged 68); Buriton, Hampshire, England
- Batting: Right-handed
- Bowling: Unknown-arm roundarm slow
- Relatives: Stuart Bonham Carter (son); Anthony Abdy (brother-in-law)

Domestic team information
- Years: Team
- 1880–1885: Hampshire

Career statistics
Competition	First-class
Matches	8
Runs scored	260
Batting average	17.33
100s/50s	–/2
Top score	67
Balls bowled	108
Wickets	2
Bowling average	31.50
5 wickets in innings	–
10 wickets in match	–
Best bowling	2/22
Catches/stumpings	5/–
- Source: Cricinfo, 21 July 2011

Lothian George Bonham-Carter JP (29 September 1858 – 1 January 1927) was an English first-class cricketer and businessman involved in brewing.

== Biography ==
The son of the politician John Bonham-Carter, he was born into the prominent Bonham Carter family, in September 1858 at Adhurst St Mary, Hampshire. He was educated at Clifton College, where he played for and captained the college cricket team. Following the completion of his education, he enlisted into the Gloucestershire Engineer Volunteer Corps as a supernumerary sub-lieutenant in March 1876. In July of that year, he attended the Royal Indian Engineering College (RIEC) on the Cooper's Hill Estate in Surrey. He joined the 1st Berkshire Rifle Volunteer Corps as a second lieutenant in November 1878, before resigning his commission in June 1880. In the month which followed his resignation, Bonham-Carter made his debut in first-class cricket for Hampshire against the Marylebone Cricket Club at Lord's in 1880. A gap of four years would pass until he next played first-class cricket, with him making a further seven appearances in 1884 and 1885; following the 1885 season, Hampshire lost their first-class status on the back of poor results. In eight first-class matches, he scored 260 runs at an average of 17.33; he made two half centuries, with a highest score of 67. He was known to play rugby union, having represented Surrey while at the RIEC.

For his living, Bonham-Carter was both a brewer and a sheep farmer. As a brewer, he was a managing director of the Brickwood brewery in Portsmouth, having previously assisted his family with their running of the Spicer brewery. He was also a justice of the peace and a former chairman of the East Hampshire Conservative Association. He married Emily Maud in 1882, with her predeceasing him. Their son, Stuart, was a first-class cricketer and a vice-admiral in the Royal Navy. Bonham-Carter died in January 1927, following a short illness at his Buriton House residence in Buriton, Hampshire. His estate passed to his eldest son, Algernon, with parts of it being sold to the Forestry Commission to cover death duties.
