= Mount Gould Station =

Pastoral lease in Western Australia

Coordinates: 25.806°S 117.391°E

Location in Western Australia

Mount Gould Station is a pastoral lease that used to operate as a sheep station but now operates as a cattle station in Western Australia.

The property is situated approximately 140 kilometres (87 mi) north west of Meekatharra and 300 kilometres (186 mi) south of Paraburdoo in the Mid West region. Occupying an area of 2,007 square kilometres (775 sq mi) the property contains 5,058 hectares (12,499 acres) of nature reserves and vacant crown land. The soil has a low level of erosion with 88% of the land being described as nil or minor. The perennial vegetation condition is described as fair with 78% of vegetation cover being described as poor or very poor. It is estimated that the property is able to carry 9,190 sheep in summer conditions, but has stocked over 13,020 sheep over summer.

An expedition led by Francis Thomas Gregory in 1858 surveyed the area around Mount Gould and Mount Hale finding a succession of rich grassy flats having a network of rivers that ran into the Murchison or Gascoyne Rivers. They estimated that over 1,000,000 acres (404,686 ha) of good land were available for stock.

The property was advertised in 1887 when Messrs A. T. Cruikshank and Co. put it on the market along with Yalgoo Station and Balloo Station. Altogether the properties occupied and area of 530,000 acres (214,483 ha) with Mount Gould taking up 210,000 acres (84,984 ha) made up of salt bush grassland and mulga top feed.

The area is rich in the iron oxide minerals such as haematite. A deposit of around 117,000 metric tons (128,970 short tons) of haematite is known to exist within the station boundaries.

== See also ==
- List of ranches and stations
