= T. H. Stokoe =

English clergyman, schoolmaster, author and headmaster

Thomas Henry Stokoe
- Born: 1833; Hexham, Northumberland, England
- Died: 8 December 1903 (aged 69–70); Waddington, Lincolnshire, England
- Occupations: Clergyman, schoolmaster, author

Thomas Henry Stokoe DD (1833 – 8 December 1903), known as T. H. Stokoe, was an English clergyman, schoolmaster, author and headmaster.

He began his teaching career at Marlborough College and Uppingham School, was second master of Clifton College and then head of Richmond Grammar School in North Yorkshire, of Reading School, and of King's College School.

His Old Testament History for Schools was a standard textbook which went through numerous editions.

== Early life ==
The only son of Robert Stokoe, gentleman, of Hexham, Northumberland, Stokoe was educated at Uppingham and Lincoln College, Oxford, where he matriculated at the age of seventeen on 26 March 1851, and became an exhibitioner. In 1855 he took first class honours in Greats, graduating BA. He proceeded MA in 1857 and in 1859 won the University's Denyer Prize in Theology.

== Life ==
Stokoe became a deacon of the Church of England in 1857 and was ordained a priest by Thomas Musgrave, Archbishop of York, in 1858. He taught at Marlborough College in 1857–1858 before returning to Uppingham as an assistant master.

On 28 December 1860, Stokoe married Sarah Emily (born 22 March 1840), a daughter of Robert Spofforth, Esq., of Millfield, York, and they soon had two sons, Henry Robert (born 1861) and Ernest William (born 1863), who both followed their father to Oxford. Stokoe's wife had one surviving brother, an officer of the 59th who served in the Second Opium War, and four sisters, two of whom also married clergymen, H. Piggot-James, a chaplain to the East India Company, and Charles James Fuller, vicar of Ovingham, Northumberland.

In September 1862 Stokoe joined the staff of the newly founded Clifton College in Bristol, becoming the first schoolmaster recorded in the school register. He left Clifton in 1863, having served for a year as second master, the equivalent of deputy headmaster.

In 1863 he was appointed headmaster of Richmond Grammar School and perpetual curate of Trinity Church, Richmond, North Yorkshire, where he remained until 1871. He then went as head to Reading School (1871–1877) and finally was headmaster of King's College School (then in Westminster) from 1880 to 1889.

His Old Testament History for Schools was a standard textbook which went through numerous editions. He also wrote manuals on the Gospels, the Acts of the Apostles, St Paul, and the early Church. He was awarded the degree of Doctor of Divinity in 1871.

On retiring from King's College School, Stokoe became an honorary fellow of King's College, London, and served as rector of Lutterworth, Leicestershire, from 1889 to 1894, of St Michael at the North Gate, Oxford, from 1894 to 1897, and of Waddington, Lincolnshire, from then until his death.

He died on 8 December 1903 at Waddington, at the age of seventy.

His elder son, Henry Robert Stokoe, was an author on classical languages whose works include Latin Verbs (1935) and The Understanding of Syntax (1937).

== Selected publications ==
- First Days and Early Letters of the Church (various editions)
- Manual of the Acts (various editions)
- Manual of the Four Gospels (various editions)
- Old Testament History for Schools (various editions)
- On the Use and Abuse of the Proverb, 'Charity Begins at Home' (Denyer Prize Essay, Oxford, 1859)
- The Life and Letters of St Paul (various editions)
- The Lord our helper: a sermon preached in the parish church of Richmond, Yorkshire, to the trustees, boys, and friends of Richmond School, on 22 June 1864, the last day of the school half-year (1864)
