= Meredith Magniac =

English cricketer and British Army officer (1880–1917)

Personal information
- Born: 27 June 1880; Hitchin, Hertfordshire, England
- Died: 25 April 1917 (aged 36); Monchy-le-Preux, Pas-de-Calais, France
- Nickname: Maniac

Career statistics
Competition	First-class
Matches	1
Runs scored	15
Batting average	7.50
100s/50s	0/0
Top score	14
Balls bowled	138
Wickets	2
Bowling average	40.50
5 wickets in innings	0
10 wickets in match	0
Best bowling	2/81
Catches/stumpings	0/–
- Source: Cricinfo, 29 March 2021

Meredith Magniac DSO (27 June 1880 – 25 April 1917) was an English first-class cricketer and British Army officer.

The son of Major-General Francis Lane Magniac, he was born at Hitchin in June 1880. He was educated at Clifton College, where he played for the cricket XI. After completing his education, he decided to follow in his fathers footsteps by choosing a career in the British Army. He attended the Royal Military College, Sandhurst in 1898 and graduated as a second lieutenant into the 4th Battalion, Lancashire Fusiliers in 1899. He was then transferred to the 3rd Battalion, then in South Africa, with Magniac seeing action during the Second Boer War. He was promoted to lieutenant during the course of the war in May 1900, before being promoted to captain in February 1904. He remained in South Africa following the end of the conflict and later played in a first-class cricket match for the South Africa Army cricket team against Pelham Warner's touring Marylebone Cricket Club (MCC) side at Pretoria in January 1906. He batted twice in the match, being run out for 1 run in the Army first innings, while in their second innings he was dismissed for 14 runs by Frederick Fane. As a bowler he took 2 wickets in the MCC first innings, dismissing Jack Board and Schofield Haigh. When the 3rd Battalion was disbanded, he was transferred to the 1st Battalion, where he served in British Malta and British India. He was appointed an adjutant of the 1st Battalion and upon the expiration of his term, Magniac passed a course at the Staff College, Quetta which allowed him to be appointed a brigade major at Fermoy in Ireland.

When the First World War began, Meredith returned to England with his battalion. He opted to leave a staff appointment to return to the Lancashire Fusiliers in February 1915. His first action in the war came in April 1915, when he landed with the Lancashire Fusiliers at Gallipoli. He remained with his battalion throughout the campaign, commanding the 1st Battalion at Cape Helles. During the campaign he was promoted to major in September 1915, and was mentioned in dispatches for his efforts in aiding with the allied evacuation in December 1915. He was made a Companion of the Distinguished Service Order in the 1916 Birthday Honours. Following this he was promoted to lieutenant colonel. Magniac went with the 1st Battalion to the Western Front in 1916, where he was wounded in action during the first day of the Battle of the Somme when the 1st Battalion attempted to capture Beaumont-Hamel. He was killed by a shell on 25 April 1917 near Monchy-le-Preux, while recessing with two other officers in a communications trench. He is buried in Beaurains Road British Cemetery, near Arras.
