= Robert Edwin Bush =

British explorer, businessman, sportsman and politician

The Honourable Robert Bush
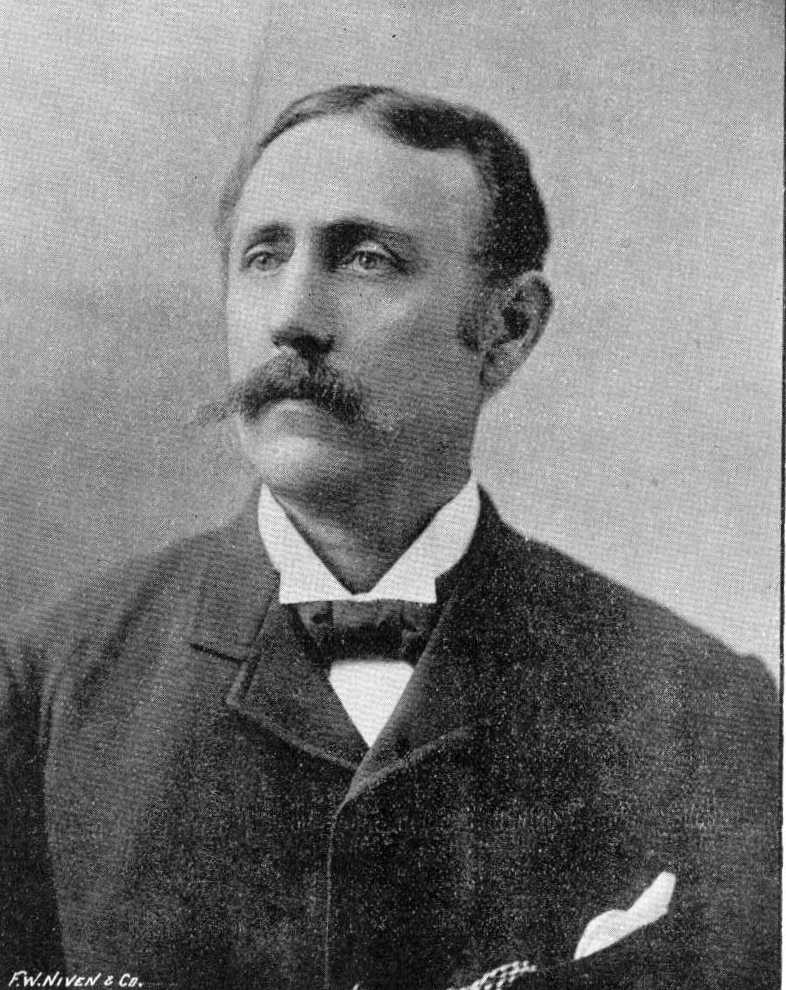

Member of the Legislative Council of Western Australia
- In office 24 December 1890 – 17 July 1893
- Preceded by: Theodore Fawcett
- Succeeded by: None (abolished)

Personal details
- Born: 11 October 1855 Redland, Bristol, England
- Died: 29 December 1939 (aged 84) Stoke Bishop, Bristol, England

Robert Edwin Bush (11 October 1855 – 29 December 1939) was a British explorer, businessman, sportsman, and politician who was primarily known for his activities in colonial Western Australia. Arriving there in the 1870s, he was one of the settlers in the Gascoyne region and took up a number of pastoral lease. He served on the Western Australian Legislative Council from 1890 to 1893. He eventually returned to England, where he was a Civic Sheriff of Bristol and Deputy Lieutenant Gloucestershire.

== Early life ==
Bush was born at Redland, Bristol; his father was Lieutenant-Colonel Robert Bush, who commanded a detachment of the 96th Infantry in Western Australia in the 1840s. Bush attended Clifton College from 1865 to 1875, captaining the school's cricket team in his last two years. Between August 1874 and June 1877, he played first-class cricket for Gloucestershire County Cricket Club, alongside W. G. Grace and his brother James Bush; he was a right-handed batsman and occasional wicket-keeper.

== Travel and life in Australia ==
Some time afterwards, Bush travelled to Western Australia, where he worked for eighteen months as a jackaroo on Murgoo Station. After taking a cargo of horses to Mauritius, he spent six months from October 1879 to March 1880 exploring north of the Gascoyne River. He later took up a number of sheep and cattle stations in the area including Bidgemia, Clifton Downs and Mount Clere Stations, becoming a leading Gascoyne pastoralist. He also became interested in gold prospecting, and joined the gold rush to the Yilgarn after the discovery of gold there in 1887.

He was instrumental in the purchase of the land for the WACA (Western Australia Cricket ground), as he joined with other people in purchasing the original land there.

In 1889, Bush became a justice of the peace, and in December of the following year, he became a nominated member of Western Australia's first Legislative Council under responsible government, which position he held until his resignation in July 1893.

In January 1893, he married a widow named Constance Harper (née Lochee); she died three years later.

== Return to England ==
Bush returned to England in the early 1900s, and bought Bishop's Knoll at Stoke Bishop near Bristol. In 1907, he married Margery Scott. In 1911 he became Sheriff of Bristol, and in the same year was president of the Gloucestershire County Cricket Club. From 1912 to 1939, he was director of Dalgety & Co. in London.

When World War I broke out, Bush converted Bishop's Knoll into a hospital for wounded soldiers at his own cost, and subsequently served there as an ambulance orderly. Bishop's Knoll War Hospital admitted its first patients late in 1914; it would later treat many Anzac casualties of the Battle of Gallipoli, including Victoria Cross recipient John Patrick Hamilton. After the war, Bush was created a Knight of Grace of the Order of St John of Jerusalem.

In 1919, Bush was the Australian delegate to the International Red Cross meeting at Geneva. In later life, he was involved in the film industry and in broadcasting. He travelled regularly throughout the world, returning to Western Australia 13 times. He died at Bishop's Knoll on 29 December 1939.
