= Mark Moore (educator) =

British educator

Mark Jonathan Moore (born 25 April 1961) was the headmaster (Head of college) of Clifton College in Bristol from 2005 to 2015, when he resigned.

== Education and teaching ==
Moore was educated at Wolverhampton Grammar School and read English at Downing College, Cambridge.

Moore was previously the Head of English and the Director of University Entrance at Radley College and taught at Marlborough College and Eton College. Moore was most recently the Executive headmaster of Akademeia High School in Warsaw, Poland (until June 2020).

Moore left Clifton College in 2015 following allegations of sexual abuse that took place during his tenure as headmaster. In November 2020 he apologised to the Independent Inquiry into Child Sexual Abuse for Clifton's and his failure to uncover and discover the offending behaviour.

== Sporting achievements ==
At Cambridge, Moore captained the university Eton Fives team and was the national Eton Fives champion.
