= James Bush (sportsman) =

English sportsman

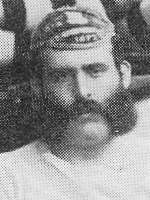

Personal information
- Full name: James Arthur Bush
- Born: 28 July 1850; Cawnpore, Uttar Pradesh, India
- Died: 21 September 1924 (aged 74); Clevedon, Somerset
- Batting: Left-handed
- Role: Wicket-keeper

Domestic team information
- Years: Team
- 1870–1890: Gloucestershire

Career statistics
Competition	First-class
Matches	148
Runs scored	1,263
Batting average	8.04
100s/50s	0/2
Top score	57
Balls bowled	136
Wickets	0
Bowling average	–
5 wickets in innings	–
10 wickets in match	–
Best bowling	–
Catches/stumpings	206/93
- Source: CricketArchive, 8 October 2022
- School: Clifton College

Rugby union career
- Position: Three-quarter
Amateur team(s)
Years	Team	Apps	(Points)
- Clifton Rugby Football Club
–	Blackheath FC		
–	Gloucestershire		
International career
Years	Team	Apps	(Points)
- England

James Arthur Bush (28 July 1850 – 21 September 1924) was an English sportsman who played first-class cricket for Gloucestershire County Cricket Club and represented England at rugby union.

== Family ==
Bush, the son of Major Robert Bush and his wife Emily, was educated at Clifton College, as were three younger brothers who played rugby for the Clifton Rugby Football Club. One of them, Robert Edwin Bush, also played cricket at Gloucestershire and later moved to Western Australia where he went exploring and became a member of the Western Australian Legislative Council. Another brother, John Edward Bush, had an accomplished military career where he reached the rank of Brigadier General. The third brother to play rugby at Clifton was James Paul Bush, who also served in the military as a surgeon with the Bristol Royal Infirmary and was at one time the Deputy Lieutenant for Gloucestershire.

== Cricket ==
Born in India, Bush played at Gloucestershire as an amateur. He was Gloucestershire's wicket-keeper in their strong team of the 1870s which won the only four championships in their history, one of them shared. Bush was a good friend of captain W.G. Grace and was the best man at his wedding. He toured Australia with a W.G. Grace XI in 1873/74 which caused him to miss a rugby international against Scotland.

Bush made just two half centuries in his first-class career, with a highest score of 57 against Yorkshire in an 1879 County Match.

Aside from playing at Gloucestershire, Bush also represented the Gentlemen cricket team in a couple of Gentlemen v Players fixtures and also played a match for the South of England cricket team.

== Rugby ==
Bush was capped five times for England at international rugby, playing as a forward. All but one of those came against Scotland, with games in 1872, 1873, 1875 and 1876. He won his only other cap when he lined up for England against Ireland at Leinster in 1875. Before his England debut, Bush had made five appearances for Blackheath.

He also played some association football matches as a goalkeeper for Clifton F.C.
