= Mount Clere Station =

Pastoral lease in Western Australia

Coordinates: 25.0968918°S 117.5928185°E

Location in Western Australia

Mount Clere Station is a pastoral lease that once operated as a sheep station but currently operates as a cattle station in Western Australia.

The property is situated approximately 202 kilometres (126 mi) north west of Meekatharra and 213 kilometres (132 mi) south of Paraburdoo in the Gascoyne region.

The first European to visit the area was Charles Brockman during his exploration of the Gascoyne in 1876. Brockman named Mount Clere as well as the Minilya and Lyndon Rivers.

The early settlers in the area, including the Davis brothers, who owned Mount Clere, experienced many problems with the local Aboriginal people, and had reported numerous cases of sheep stealing and cattle spearing in 1886. The store and homestead at Mount Clere were broken into and robbed in 1892.

Robert Edwin Bush, the owner of neighbouring Clifton Downs Station, acquired Mount Clere from John Sydney Davis in the early 1890s. Both properties encompassed 1,000,000 acres (404,686 ha) and in 1891 the combined holding was running 75,000 sheep.

The station manager in 1897, Mr. H. S. Steele, disappeared while swimming in Fremantle; his body was never recovered but his waistcoat and watch were found.

Two bodies were found under a gum tree on a distant part of the run in 1914. The remains were only bones but each had a bullet hole in the skull. The police believed the two men committed suicide, possibly while dying of thirst. No one at Mount Clere knew the men but remembered seeing horse tracks leading in the direction toward the Mount Egerton mining fields.

Good rains fell over the run in 1939 with 2 inches (51 mm) falling in two days causing the river to flood. In February 1942 Mount Clere recorded 14 inches (356 mm) of rain in less than a month. The rains triggered floods along the Gascoyne River, isolating many of the properties along the river.

The area experienced a prolonged drought from 2000 to 2010, when stations such as Mount Clere had only one year of almost average rainfall. By 2010 the station had been largely destocked and was hand-feeding the remaining cattle on the property. The station owner, Greg Watters, said the land was so dry even the trees were dying, a situation he had not seen before.

== See also ==
- List of pastoral leases in Western Australia
