= Clifton College =

Public school in Bristol, England

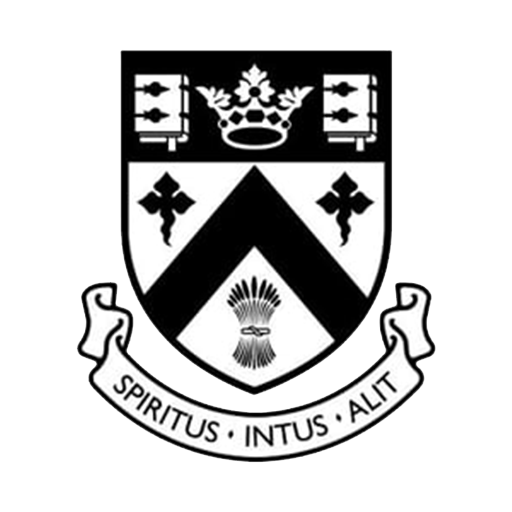

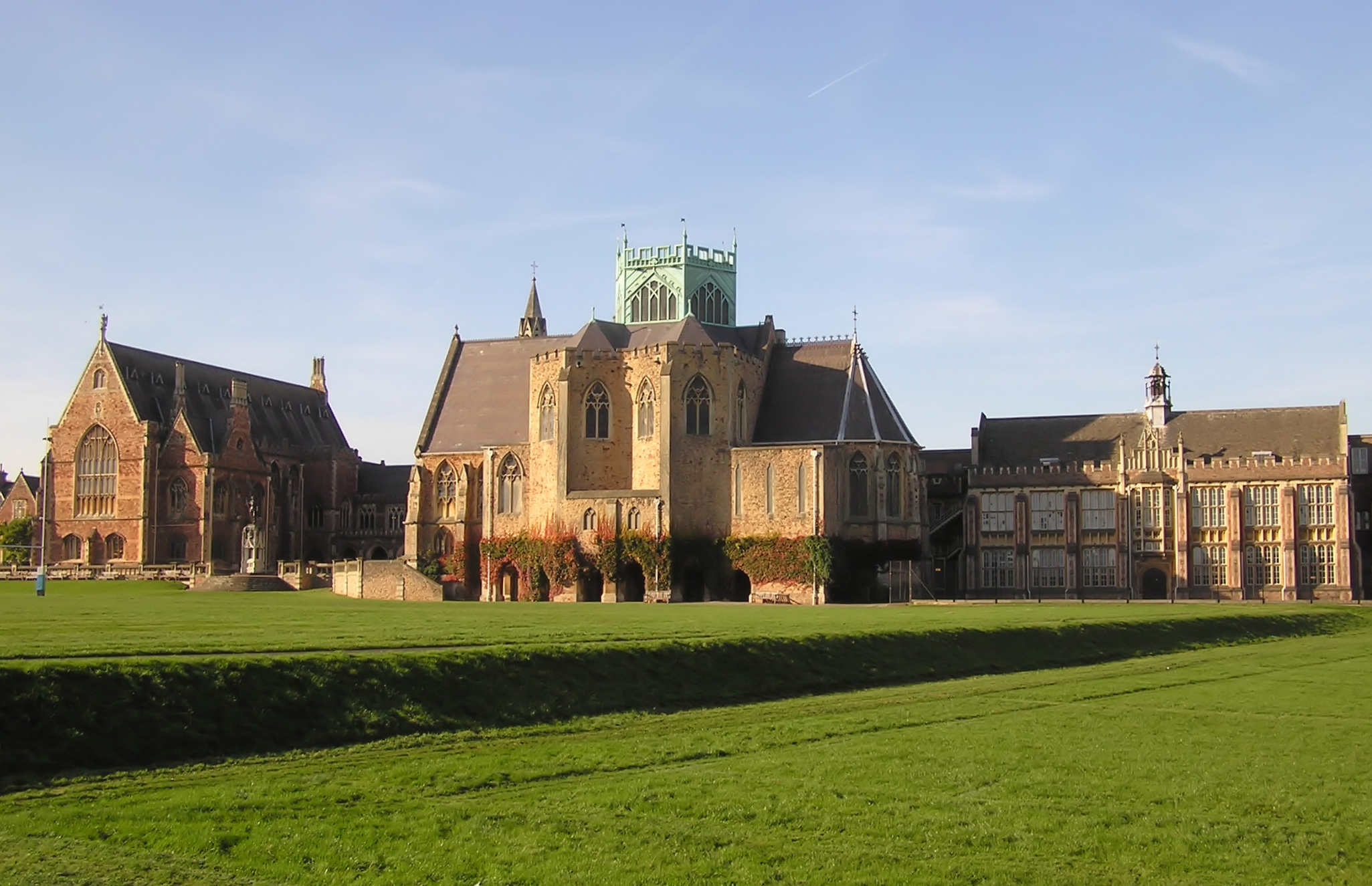
- Clifton College Upper School, seen from the Close

Location
- College Road; Bristol, BS8 3JH; England; 51.4618°N 2.6200°W

Information
- Type: Public school Private boarding and day school
- Motto: Latin: Spiritus Intus Alit; The spirit nourishes within
- Established: 1862; 164 years ago
- Founder: John Percival
- Department for Education URN: 109334 Tables
- Executive Head: Dr Christopher Stevens
- Gender: Mixed
- Age: 3 to 18
- Enrolment: 1,171
- Capacity: 1,200
- Houses: 12 (in the Upper School)
- Colours: Blue, Green, Navy
- Alumni: Old Cliftonians
- Website: cliftoncollege.com

Clifton College is a public school in the city of Bristol in South West England, founded in 1862 and offering both boarding and day school for pupils aged 13–18. In its early years, unlike most contemporary public schools, it emphasised science rather than classics in the curriculum, and was less concerned with social elitism, for example by admitting day-boys on equal terms and providing a dedicated boarding house for Jewish boys, called Polack's House. Having linked its General Studies classes with Badminton School, it admitted girls to every year group (from pre-prep up to Upper 6th, excepting 5th form due to potential O-levels disruption) in 1987, and was the first of the traditional boys' public schools to become fully coeducational. Polack's House closed in 2005 but a scholarship fund open to Jewish candidates still exists. Clifton College is one of the original 26 English public schools as defined by the Public Schools Yearbook of 1889.

The school was also the headquarters of the US Army in Britain during part of the Second World War. General Omar Bradley used the school's buildings as a staff office from October to November 1944.

Clifton College has educated several Nobel laureates: Sir John Kendrew, who received the Nobel Prize in Chemistry in 1962; Sir John Hicks, winner of the 1972 Nobel Prize in Economics; Sir Nevill Francis Mott, who received the Nobel Prize in Physics in 1977; and Geoffrey Hinton who received the Nobel Prize in Physics in 2024.

== Introduction ==
The school takes boys and girls aged between 13 and 18. It has its own preparatory school, Clifton College Preparatory School (known as the 'Prep'), for children from 7 to 13 which adjoins the school and shares many of the same facilities; there is also a pre-preparatory school for younger children aged 3 to 7. To distinguish it from the junior schools, Clifton College proper is referred to as the 'Upper School'.

There are around 750 children in the Upper School of whom about 40% are girls. At the start of the 2004 – 2005 school year, a new boarding/day house for girls (Hallward's House) was opened.

In 2005, the school was one of fifty of the country's leading independent schools which were found guilty of running an illegal price-fixing cartel, exposed by The Times, which had allowed them to drive up fees for thousands of parents. Each school was required to pay a penalty of £10,000 and all agreed to make ex-gratia payments totalling three million pounds into a trust designed to benefit pupils who attended the schools during the period in respect of which fee information was shared.

== World War II ==
During World War II the heavy bombing of Bristol caused the students to be evacuated to Bude. In February 1941 the buildings were used by the Royal Army Service Corps as an Officer Cadet Training Unit. In 1942 they were replaced by the United States Army who established it as the headquarters of V Corps and then the First Army. Staff were involved in preparations for the Normandy landings under General Omar Bradley. After D-Day the college was taken over as headquarters of the Ninth Army under General William Hood Simpson.

To enable rapid travel and communications between the headquarters and dispersed units extensive use was made of light aircraft for travel. Some flights used Filton Airfield and others Whitchurch, however the majority were from the college's playing fields at Beggars Bush Field, between the college and Leigh Woods, which was turned into an airfield.

== Houses ==
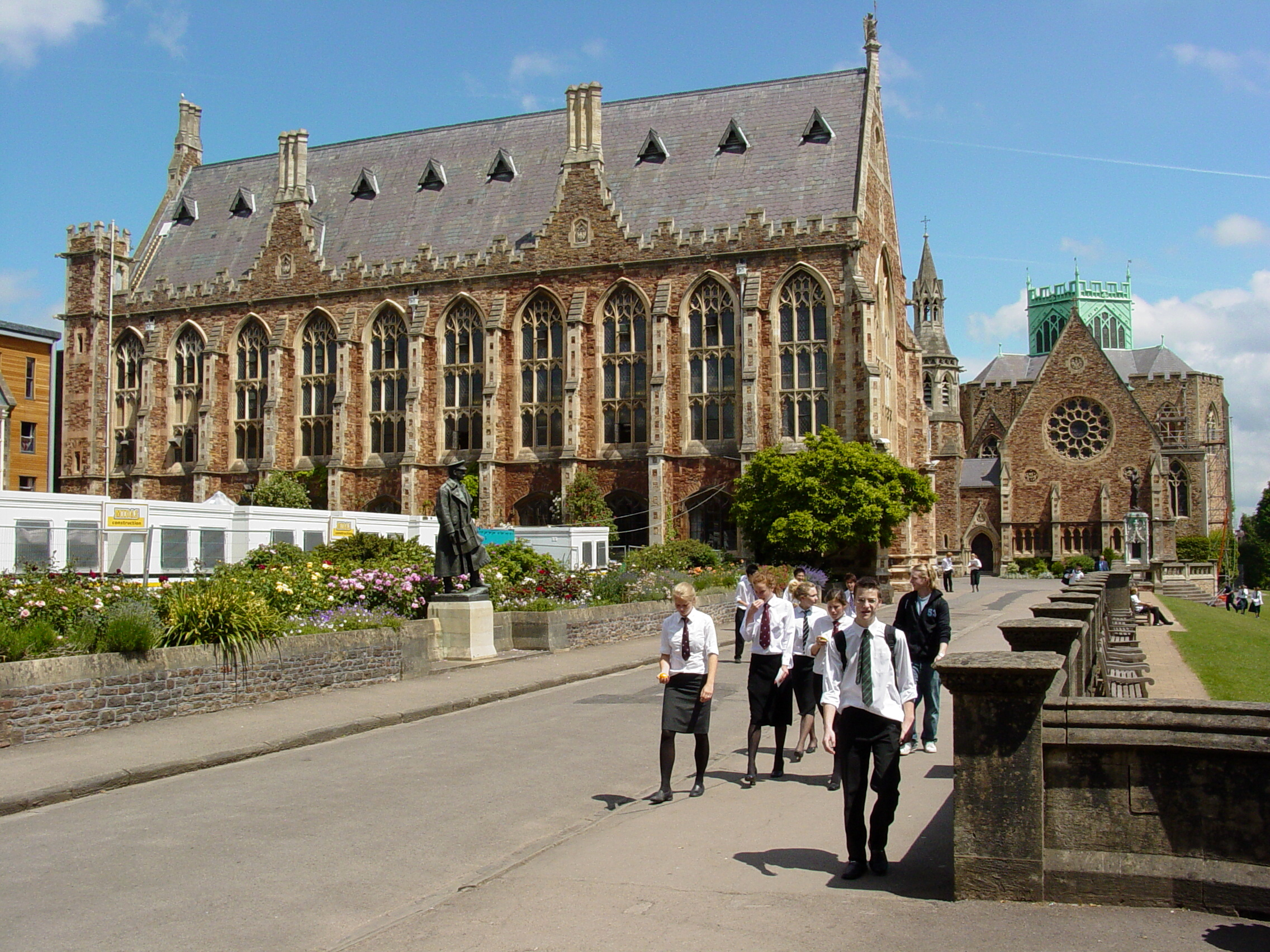
Pupils at Clifton College in 2009

Before 1987, Clifton was a boys-only school with seven boarding houses (School House, Brown's, Watson's, Dakyns', Oakeley's, Wiseman's, Polack's) and three day-houses (East Town, North Town and The South Town). In each of the current seven boarding Houses (four for boys, three for girls) live the Housemaster or Housemistress and family, an Assistant and the Matron. In addition, each House has up to four non-residential Tutors. Also, pupils wear ties with different coloured stripes according to their house membership; which are also the colours of the jerseys the pupils wear to distinguish between houses in inter-house sporting events.

=== Current houses ===
There are 12 houses currently in the Upper School of Clifton College, which have an order of precedence based on the date of their foundation. There are also houses in Clifton College Preparatory School not listed below.

House	Colours	Motto	Gender	Boarding/Day
School House	Black/Red	Latin: Spes Ancora Vitae; Hope is the anchor of life	M	Boarding
Moberly's House	Red-Purple/Blue/White	Latin: Stet fortuna domus May fortune attend those who dwell here	M	Boarding
Oakeley's House	Black/White	Latin: Floruit Floret Floreat; It has flourished, it is flourishing, may it flourish	F (M until 1986)	Boarding
Wiseman's House	Black/Purple	Latin: Nec tenui ferar penna On no feeble wing shall I be borne	M	Boarding
Watson's House	Pale Blue/Black	Latin: Fratres in Unum; Brothers Together	M	Boarding
North Town	Dark Blue/Black/White	Latin: Vestigia Nulla Retrorsum; Not one step back	M	Day
The South Town	Black/Green	Latin: Vis Unita Fortior; Together we are stronger	M	Day
East Town	Black/Yellow/Orange	Latin: Sol Semper Resurgit; The sun always rises again	M	Day
Worcester House	Black/Green/White	Latin: Possunt quia posse videntur They can because they think they can	F	Boarding
West Town	Black/Pink	Latin: A posse ad esse From the possible to the actual	F	Day
Hallward's House	Black/Purple/Green	Latin: Si vobis confiditis, mundus vobis erit Believe in yourself and the world is yours	F	Day with Sixth Form Boarding
Holland's House	White/Pink/Navy	Latin: Non ducor duco I am not led, I lead	F	Day

Holland's house, a girls' day house, was made in 2017 with colours white, pink and navy.

=== Former houses ===
Several other houses have existed during the school's history. In WW2, while the school was evacuated to Bude, United House (UH) was created from pupils of houses placed in temporary abeyance. Dakyns' House and Brown's House were closed in 1993, and Polack's House, which took Jewish boys only, was closed in 2005. These are listed below:

House	Colours	Motto	Gender	Boarding/Day	Closed
Dakyns' House	White-Pink-White (tie); Brown (sport)	Strike Dakyns, The Devil's in the Hemp	M	Boarding	1993
Brown's House	Black/Yellow	Greek: Arche Andra Deixei; Authority reveals the man	M	Boarding	1993
Polack's House	Black/Red/White	Latin: Vires acquirit eundo We gather strength as we go	M	Boarding (Jewish)	2004

In the decades after the school's foundation, with the exception of School House, the Houses were named after the Housemaster at the time, but in the late 19th century this pattern was abandoned, and all Houses reverted to the name of their first Housemaster. This nomenclature convention was not however used for Hallward's House (founded in 2004 and named after a former Headmaster, Bertrand Hallward, nor for Worcester House (the second girls' house, founded in 1989 and named after the road in which it is situated). When Dakyns' House and Brown's House were merged in September 1993, the original suggestion was to name the new establishment "Dakyns-Brown's House", but following a suggestion from a pupil, the name "Moberly's House" was chosen, commemorating William Moberly, the only teacher who had been involved in both of the antecedent establishments (as Housemaster of both Dakyns' and House Tutor of Brown's).

== Buildings and grounds ==
=== The first school buildings ===
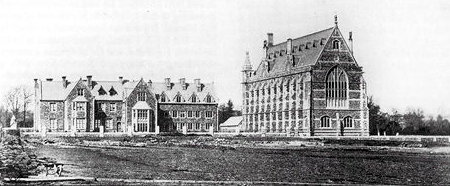
Big School (right) soon after it was built – 1860s.

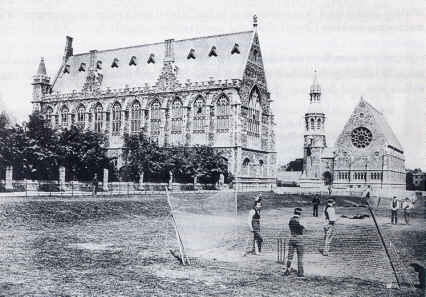
The college in 1866.

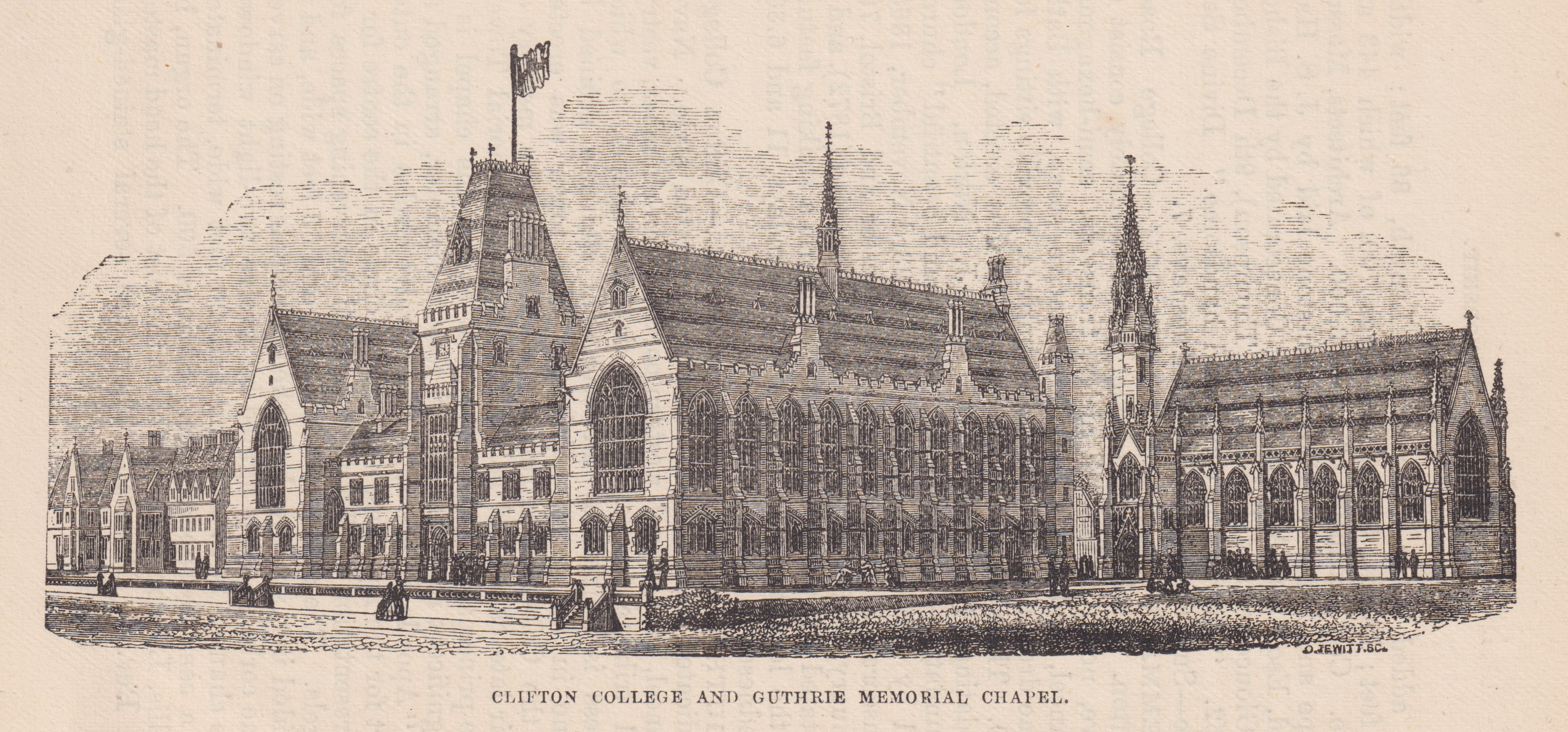
Clifton College 1872.

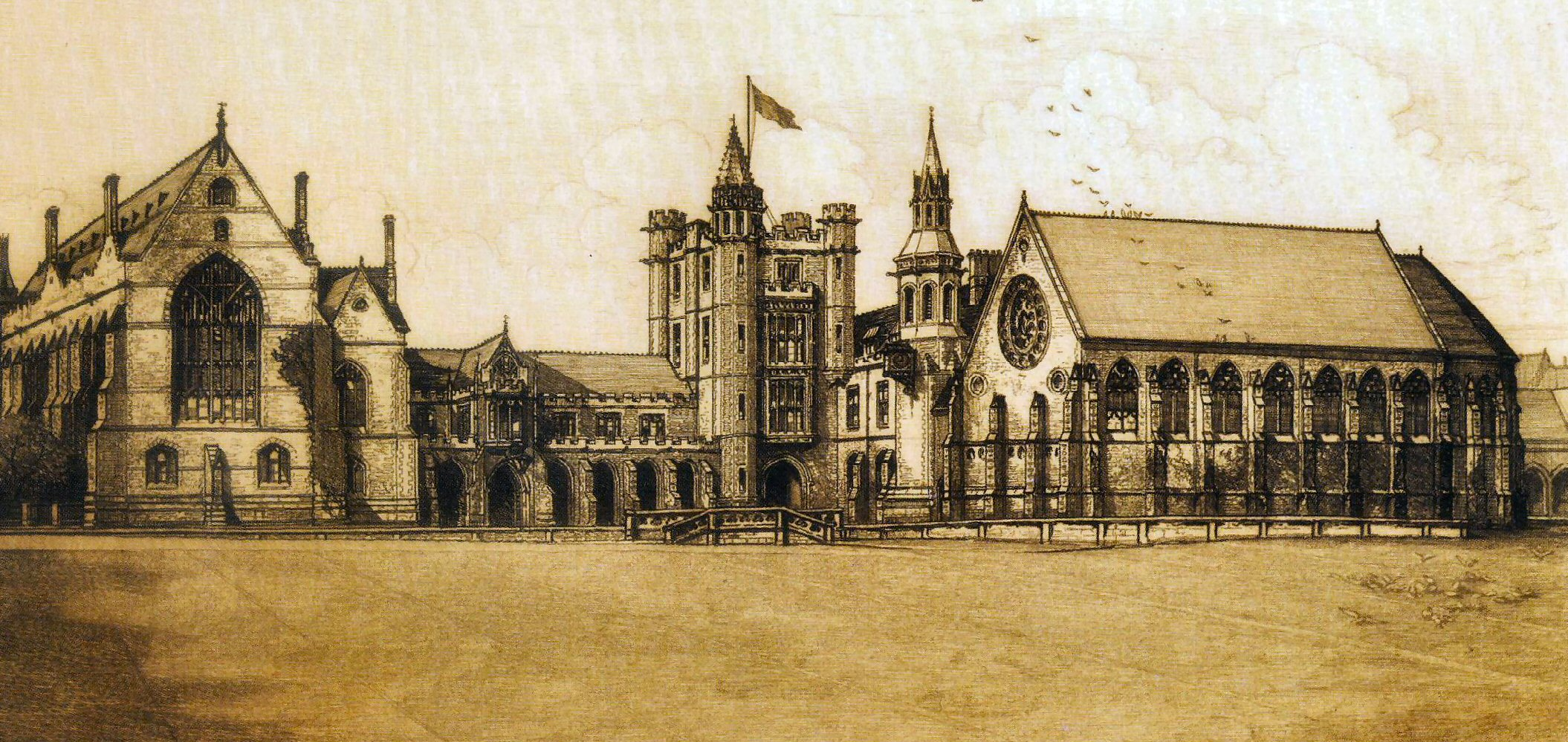
An 1898 etching of the College Close.

The college buildings were designed by the architect Charles Hansom (the brother of Joseph Hansom); his first design was for Big School and a proposed dining hall. Only the former was built and a small extra short wing was added in 1866 – this is what now contains the Marshal's office and the new staircase into Big School. It has been designated by English Heritage as a Grade II listed building.

Hansom was called back in the 1870s and asked to design what is now the Percival Library and the open-cloister classrooms. This project was largely completed by 1875 – although the Wilson Tower was not built until 1890 (Grade II listed).

Other buildings were added as follows:

- By 1875, Brown's, Dakyns' and Oakley's had been opened along with what is now 32 College Road – originally this functioned as accommodation for bachelor masters
- Three fives courts (1864)
- The original sanitorium (1865)
- Gymnasium (1867)
- Two swimming pools (1869)
- An open rackets court (1872)
- The present workshop (1873)
- The chapel (1867); this was built to Charles Hansom's original design, but was moved from the intended site (which is now the gym). As built, the chapel was a narrow aisleless building, and just the width of its present west end. It was the gift of the widow of Canon Guthrie. Hansom was given permission "to quarry sufficient stone from the college grounds for the purposes of the Chapel building".

The Chapel building was licensed by the Bishop of Gloucester and Bristol in 1867. It is now Grade II* listed.

=== Later building ===
In early Percival years, the nucleus of the school buildings was laid down.

In 1880, the school's East Wing was completed as far as the staircase (this had yet to be linked to the library by the Wilson Tower) and added a science lecture-room (which is the reason for the curious 'stepped' windows), a laboratory and several classrooms.

In 1886, a porters' lodge and what is now the staff common room were added by enlarging what had been the original science school. On the ground floor was the school tuck-shop and above this (in what is now the Upper Common Room) was a drawing-school. The day boys were provided for in Town Rooms for both North and South Town. The East Wing was then completed by carrying it beyond the staircase and then creating an additional classroom at each end. The ground-floor classroom (then Room 12) is now known as the "Newbolt Room" and has been furnished by the Old Cliftonian Society, which still uses it for reunions. Between 1890 and the start of the First World War, the new Music School (1897) was added and the Chapel rebuilt (1910).

Dr John King, whose headmastership spanned the war years, had little scope for building after 1914, but he did oversee the development of the playing fields at Beggar's Bush, the building of the Memorial Arch, the neo-classical cricket pavilion and the opening of the new Sanitorium in Worcester Road.

On 3 December 1918, the former headmaster John Percival died and was buried in the vault of the school Chapel. In 1921, a memorial chapel was created and consecrated about his tomb. Norman Whatley was the headmaster between 1923 and 1938; his tenure saw the opening of the Preparatory School and the building of the Science School on the site of the previous Junior School. Designed by A. E. Munby, it was opened in 1926.

Also at this time, the school acquired Hugh Ray Easton's new east windows. The windows also contain a curiosity: beneath the representation of the heavenly Jerusalem is depicted a game of cricket on the Close – with one of Whatley's sons taking part. In 1965–1967, the theatre was built by the architects Whicheloe and MacFarlane.

In 1982, on the site of the old swimming pools, the new Sports Hall, remedial gym and a new covered swimming pool were built; previously boys used the outdoor Victorian pool and its outdoor covered changing cubicles.

The 1980s also saw the building of the Coulson Centre which links together two previously separate classroom blocks, at Muir and Birdwood houses. As a result of the improvements in modern medicine, the Sanitorium in Worcester Road was unnecessarily large for the school's needs, and so the old pre-1921 Sanatorium on the Close has been refitted to serve this purpose, whilst the Worcester Road sanatorium has been refitted as the headmaster's house.

=== Memorial arch ===
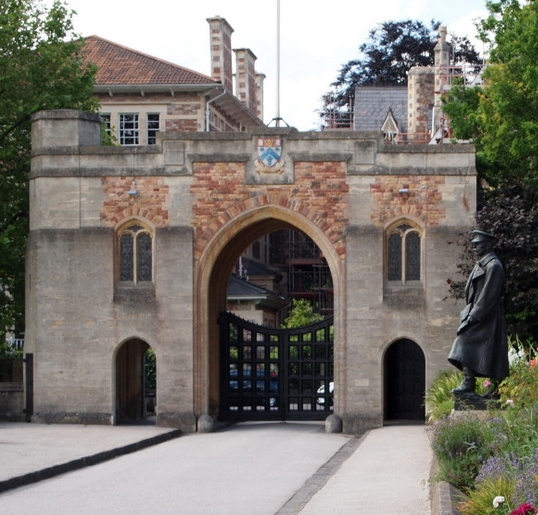
The memorial arch taken from the quad.

At the side of College Road, opposite what was Dakyns' boarding house (now East Town and North Town), is the college's memorial arch designed by Charles Holden, which commemorates teachers and pupils who died in the two World Wars. Traditionally, the removal of headgear is expected when walking through the arch. There is also a school rule that states hands must be out of pockets when walking through the arch. It is now Grade II listed.

The college's buildings, mainly School House, were used as the main HQ where the D-Day landings were planned. The college played a major part in both World Wars; Field Marshal Douglas Haig was an Old Cliftonian who went on to command the British armed forces in the First World War. Through the memorial arch and in front of School House is a life-size statue of Haig. At the edge of the quad is a memorial to those killed in the South African Wars.

=== The Close ===
The college ground, known as the Close, played a role in the history of cricket and witnessed 13 of W G Grace's first-class hundreds for Gloucestershire in the County Championship. Grace's children attended the college.

The Close appears in a poem by Old Cliftonian Henry Newbolt – "Vitaї Lampada" ("There's a breathless hush in the Close to-night")

== Cricket ==
Clifton College was one of the original 8 "Lord's Schools", who were entitled to play fixtures at Lord's against each other. These matches were Clifton v Tonbridge, Rugby v Marlborough, Cheltenham v Haileybury, and Eton v Harrow. The Clifton v Tonbridge fixture at Lord's was first played in 1914, but ceased to be played in the 1960s, along with most other Lord's Schools matches. Today, only Eton v Harrow continues to take place at Lord's. A centenary match took place in June 2014 to commemorate the anniversary of the first playing of this match.

Plaque at Clifton College, fixed in 1962.

On one of the college's cricket pitches, now known as Collins' Piece, what was for 116 years the highest-ever cricket score was reached in June 1899, in the inter-house match between Clark's House and North Town. In this match A. E. J. Collins, killed in the First World War, scored 628 not out, but not under the current rules of the game. The record was surpassed in January 2016 by 15-year-old Pranav Dhanawade of Mumbai, India, with a score of 1,009 in a schools' match. Collins was not the first Clifton schoolboy to hold this record: in 1868, Edward Tylecote, who went on to help England reclaim the Ashes in 1882–83, was a previous holder, with 404 not out in a game between Classicals and Moderns. Collins' achievement is commemorated on a small plaque on the side of the ceramics building.

A number of famous cricketers are Clifton alumni. A fuller entry can be found under the List of Old Cliftonians, and includes:

- W. G. Grace junior, son of W. G. Grace, Gloucestershire and MCC cricketer.
- Sir Kingsmill Key, Bt., captain of Surrey, MCC and England cricketer.
- John Daniell, captain of Somerset, England rugby international
- Basil Allen, cricketer, Gloucestershire captain
- Edwin Field, Middlesex cricketer, England rugby international
- James Kirtley, England cricketer
- Matt Windows, Gloucestershire cricketer and England 'A' cap.
- Edward Tylecote, England cricketer
- George Whitehead, England cricketer
- Charlie Townsend, England cricketer
- Edward Scott, Gloucestershire & MCC cricketer, England rugby international (captain).
- James Bush Gloucestershire cricketer, England rugby international
- Robert Edwin Bush Gloucestershire cricketer
- William Brain, English cricketer and footballer
- Archibald Fargus, English cricketer, scholar, clergyman
- Lothian Bonham-Carter, English cricketer, Justice of the Peace and soldier

== Religious community ==
Clifton has chapel services and a focus on Christianity, but for 125 years there was also a Jewish boarding house (Polack's), complete with kosher dining facilities and synagogue for boys in the Upper School. This was the last of its kind in Europe. However, at the end of the 2004–05 school year, the Polack's trust (Polack's House Educational Trust) announced that Polack's House would be closed due to the low numbers of boys in the house (although many pupils were turned down subsequently). Polack's House Educational Trust (PHET) now offers scholarships to the school.

The school chapel was the inspiration behind Newbolt's poem Clifton Chapel, which starts:

CLIFTON CHAPEL

This is the Chapel: here, my son,
Your father thought the thoughts of youth,
And heard the words that one by one
The touch of Life has turn'd to truth.
Here in a day that is not far,
You too may speak with noble ghosts
Of manhood and the vows of war
You made before the Lord of Hosts.

== Redgrave Theatre ==
Clifton College has its own theatre, originally known as the Clifton College Theatre, but later renamed in honour of old-boy actor Michael Redgrave. The theatre was built in the 1960s and has a seating capacity of 323. As well as school productions, the venue hosts visiting small scale productions including many by the nearby Bristol Old Vic Theatre School.

== Headmasters ==
Listed in order of appointment:

- 1862–1879 John Percival (Bishop of Hereford)
- 1879–1890 James Wilson
- 1891–1905 Michael George Glazebrook
- 1905–1910 Albert David (Bishop of Liverpool)
- 1910–1923 John Edward King
- 1923–1938 Norman Whatley
- 1938–1948 Bertrand Hallward
- 1948–1954 Henry Desmond Pritchard Lee
- 1954–1962 Nicholas Hammond
- 1963–1975 Stephen McWatters
- 1975–1990 Stuart Morrison Andrews
- 1990–2000 Andrew Hugh Monro
- 2000–2005 Stephen Spurr
- 2005–2015 Mark Moore
- 2015–2026 Dr Tim Greene
- 2026– Dr. Chris Stevens

== Notable former masters ==
- Alexander Jones (1854–1878), former Wales footballer, killed in a shooting accident on a train while bringing a group of college cadets home from rifle practice.
- J. R. Eccles (1874–1956), an old boy who was a Physics master at Clifton, was later headmaster of Gresham's.
- J. L. Thorn, master at Clifton 1949 to 1961, later head of Repton and Winchester.
- T. E. Brown, scholar, poet, and theologian.
- R. P. Keigwin, Clifton housemaster, later Warden of Wills Hall.
- James Gordon MacGregor, a science master 1877–1879.
- Sir William McKie, Australian organist, Conductor, and composer.
- William Moberly, England rugby international (player number 32) and Gloucestershire cricket player who was famed for his partnerships with W. G. Grace.
- Wilfrid Oldaker was Chaplain from 1931 to 1938, later headmaster of Christ Church Cathedral School.
- Rt Revd David Stancliffe, later Bishop of Salisbury
- T. H. Stokoe, second master at Clifton, later head of Richmond Grammar School, Reading School, and King's College School.
- Sir Reginald Thatcher (1888–1975), composer and Principal of the Royal Academy of Music.

== Covert filming ==
Jonathan Thomson-Glover, a housemaster and former pupil, pleaded guilty to making covert films of children aged twelve to seventeen showering, changing, going to the toilet and conducting private acts, in the college itself and at an address in Cornwall. He was jailed in 2015, convicted at Taunton Crown Court, and sentenced to three years and nine months' imprisonment after admitting to 36 counts of taking, making and possessing indecent images of children.

Clifton College subsequently commissioned an independent expert to undertake a thorough review of safeguarding at the school, culminating in a report which it published in full. The report contained a number of recommendations, all of which were then implemented. This, together with a complete change in the school's leadership in 2016, led to a wholesale transformation in safeguarding culture and practices at the school.

The statutory Independent Inquiry into Child Sexual Abuse (2015–2022) criticised Clifton College and its former leadership, governance and safeguarding arrangements in its investigation into residential schools. Clifton has also made a £200k settlement with a former pupil who made claims of abuse against a former teacher in the late 1980s. Clifton's leadership today emphasize safeguarding, with a dedicated team and policies in place.

== The Old Cliftonian Society and the Clifton College Register ==
The Old Cliftonian Society [OCS] is the Society for the alumni of Clifton College – whether pupils or staff. The OCS organises reunions at the school and publishes a newsletter for alumni. Alumni are known as Old Cliftonians or OCs.

The Register's motto:

"There be of them, that have left a name behind them, that their praises might be reported..."

The Clifton College Register is the official set of records held for Clifton College in Bristol. The Register is kept and maintained by the Old Cliftonian Society.

These records have been maintained unbroken from the start of the school in 1862 and list every pupil, master and headmaster. Each person is allocated a school number – for masters and headmasters the number is prefixed with either an M or HM. The Register also maintains a record of the school roll in numbers, the Heads of School and summarises the major sporting records for each year.

The Register, published by the Old Cliftonian Society, is in four volumes:

- 1862 – 1947 (a)
- 1862 – 1962 (b)
- 1962 – 1978 (c)
- 1978 – 1994 (d)

First entries in the Register:-

=== Pupils ===
- P1. September 1862 – Francis Charles Anderson (14 November 1846 – 1881)

=== Masters ===
- M1. September 1862 – Rev Dr T. H. Stokoe, educated at Uppingham; Exhibitioner of Lincoln College, Oxford; left 1863; Preacher of Gray's Inn; d 1903)

The early years

- Numbers of pupils in the school
  - 1862 – 69
  - 1863 – 195 (including the new junior school)
  - 1864 – 237
  - 1865 – 258
  - 1866 – 278
- Heads of School
  - 1862 – H. W. Wellesley
  - 1863 – A. W. Paul

== Coat of Arms ==
Coat of arms of Clifton College
Notes Granted 8 April 1895. Escutcheon Argent, a chevron between two trefoils slipped in chief and a garb in base azure; a chief gules, thereon a ducal coronet Or between two books argent, clasped and garnished gold. Motto 'Spiritus intus alit' ('The spirit nourishes within', from Virgil's Aeneid)

== Bibliography ==
- O. F. Christie, A History of Clifton College 1860-1934 (J. W. Arrowsmith, Bristol, 1935)
- Clifton College, The History of Saint Agnes Parish,1876–1890 (J. W. Arrowsmith, Bristol, 1890)
- Clifton College, The Memorial to Old Cliftonians who fell in the South African War (J. W. Arrowsmith, Bristol, 1904)
- Clifton College, The Cliftonian Memorial of the Great War, 1914–1919 (J. W. Arrowsmith, Bristol, 1922)
- Francis G. Newbolt, Clifton College Forty Years Ago: The Diary of a Praepostor (Philip Allan & Co. Ltd, London, 1927)
- Derek Winterbottom, Henry Newbolt and the Spirit of Clifton (Redcliffe Press, Bristol, 1986)
- Derek Winterbottom, Dynasty: The Polack Family and the Jewish House at Clifton, 1878–2005 (The Polack House Educational Trust, 2008)
- Derek Winterbottom, Clifton after Percival: a public school in the twentieth century (Redcliffe Press, Bristol, 1990)

== See also ==
- Old Cliftonian Society
