= List of Argentine first-class cricketers =

This is a list in alphabetical order of Argentine cricketers who have played first-class cricket. The period 1900 to 1939 is considered the golden years of Argentine cricket, with many Argentine cricketers being of county standard and the national team playing 13 first-class matches during this period. During this period several Argentine cricketers played first-class cricket in England for county sides. No Argentine cricketer has played first-class cricket since Jack Mendl in 1957. (Note: Brian Ward, who represented Argentina in the 1979 ICC Trophy, was a permitted overseas player from England, so was not per se Argentinian. He had played first-class cricket for Essex between 1967 and 1972.)

The details are the player's usual name followed by the years in which he was active as a first-class player and then his name is given as it would appear on modern match scorecards. Note that many players represented other first-class teams besides Argentina. Players are shown to the end of the 2021 season.

As of 26 January 2022

== A ==
- Cecil Ayling (1937/38) : C. D. Ayling
- Cyril Ayling (1937/38) : C. E. Ayling
- Dennet Ayling (1926/27–1937/38) : E. N. D. Ayling

== B ==
- A. E. Best (1926/27–1929/30)
- Harry Biedermann (1911/12) : H. E. C. Biedermann
- Charles Brook (1926/27) : C. W. Brook
- Geoffrey Brooke-Taylor (1919–1929/30) : G. P. Brooke-Taylor
- Gordon Brown (1911/12) : G. G. Brown
- Frank Bryans (1926/27–1929/30) : F. A. Bryans
- K. S. Bush (1937/38)

== C ==
- John Campbell (1911/12) : J. A. Campbell
- Wilfred Cowes (1926/27) : W. A. Cowes
- Austen Cowper (1908–1924/25) : S. A. Cowper
- O. T. Cunningham (1926/27)

== D ==
- Herbert Dorning (1911/12–1929/30) : H. Dorning
- Gerald Drysdale (1911/12) : G. C. Drysdale

== F ==
- George Ferguson (1929/30–1937/38) : G. W. Ferguson
- Philip Foy (1911/12–1930) : F. A. Foy

== G ==
- William Gardom (1911/12) : W. D. C. Gardom
- Harold Garnett (1899–1914) : H. G. Garnett
- Clement Gibson (1919–1939) : C. H. Gibson
- James Gifford (1897–1898) : J. Gifford

== H ==
- Kenneth Henderson (1926/27–1929/30) : K. Henderson
- Charles Horsfall (1911/12) : C. M. Horsfall

== J ==
- Alfred Jackson (1932–1937/38) : A. L. S. Jackson
- Neville Jackson (1911/12) : N. W. Jackson
- Arnold Jacobs (1932) : A. L. Jacobs

== K ==
- Frederick Keen (1926/27–1932) : F. F. Keen
- John Knox (1926/27–1937/38) : J. Knox
- R. P. R. Ker (1937/38)

== L ==
- de Courcy Lyons (1926/27–1929/30) : d. C. Lyons

== M ==
- Henry Marshal (1926/27–1929/30) : H. W. Marshal
- Peter McRae (1936–1939) : F. M. McRae
- Derek Mendl (1951) : D. F. Mendl
- Jack Mendl (1949–1957) : J. F. Mendl

== O ==
- Rollo O'Dwyer (1929/30) : R. G. O'Dwyer

== P ==
- James Paul (1926/27–1935) : J. H. Paul

== R ==
- Robert Rudd (1911/12) : R. W. Rudd
- C. P. Russ (1911/12)

== S ==
- J. B. Sheridan (1911/12)
- Gerard Simpson (1911/12–1931) : G. A. Simpson
- George Stocks (1937/38) : G. W. Stocks
- Robert Stuart (1929/30–1937/38) : R. L. Stuart
- Stanley Sylvester (1937/38) : S. M. F. Sylvester

== T ==
- Evelyn Toulmin (1899–1912) : E. M. O. Toulmin

== V ==
- Charlie Vignoles (1937/38) : C. L. Vignoles

== W ==
- Arnold Watson Hutton (1911/12) : A. P. W. Hutton
- Thomas Wesley-Smith (1926/27) : T. Wesley-Smith
- Charles Whaley (1911/12) : C. H. Whaley
