= Gordon Brown (disambiguation) =

Gordon Brown (born 1951) was Prime Minister of the United Kingdom from 2007 to 2010.

Gordon Brown may also refer to:

== Politics ==
- Cathy Gordon Brown (born 1965), Independent candidate from Tennessee in the 2000 United States presidential election
- Gord Brown (1960–2018), Canadian politician; represented the electoral district of Leeds–Grenville
- Gordon Brown (Australian politician) (1885–1967), former President of the Australian Senate
- Gordon J. Brown (1904–1961), American politician in the state of Washington

== Sport ==
- Gordon Brown (guard) (1879–1911), captain of the 1900 Yale football team
- Gordon Brown (running back) (born 1963), former American football running back
- Gordon Brown (Argentine cricketer), early 20th-century cricketer
- Gordon Brown (Canadian football) (1927–1987), Canadian football guard
- Gordon Brown (footballer, born 1929) (1929–2010), English footballer
- Gordon Brown (footballer, born 1932) (1932–1999), Scottish footballer
- Gordon Brown (footballer, born 1933) (1933–2005), English footballer
- Gordon Brown (footballer, born 1965), Scottish footballer
- Gordon Brown (footballer, born 1979), Scottish footballer
- Gordon Brown (rugby league) (1930–2026), English rugby league footballer
- Gordon Brown (rugby union) (1947–2001), Scottish international lock forward
- Gordon Brown (Zimbabwean cricketer) (born 1981), early 2000s cricketer

== Other ==
- Andrew Gordon-Brown (born 1967), South African rower and school administrator
- Gordie Brown, actor who plays Mr Jones in the Canadian television drama Twice in a Lifetime
- Gordon Brown (businessman) (1907–1982), New Zealand accountant, businessman, rugby administrator and local politician
- Gordon H. Brown (1931–2025), New Zealand art historian
- Gordon S. Brown (1907–1996), Australian-born professor of electrical engineering at the Massachusetts Institute of Technology
- Gordon Brown (sculptor) (1958–2020), German sculptor
- Gordon Brown (author), Scottish crime fiction writer
- Gordon Brown (television presenter) (1949/1950–2024), host of the TV series Collectors
- W. Gordon Brown (1904–1979), founder of Central Baptist Seminary, Canada

== See also ==
- Gordon Browne (1858–1932), English artist and children's book illustrator
- Gordon Browning (1889–1976), American politician who represented Tennessee in Congress and served as governor of Tennessee
- Brown (surname)
