= Ayling =

Ayling is a surname belonging to:

- Astrid Ayling (born 1951), German-British rower
- Bill Ayling (1878–1950), Australian rules footballer
- Cecil Ayling (1912–1990), Argentine cricketer
- Cyril Ayling (1910–1993), Argentine cricketer
- Dennet Ayling (1906–1987), Argentine cricketer, brother of Cyril Ayling
- Dennis Ayling (1917–1998), British cinematographer
- Ernest Edward Ayling, British chemist
- Geoffrey Ayling (born 1939), Australian sport shooter
- George Ayling (1919–1964), British soldier and cricket umpire
- Héctor Muñoz Ayling (1898–1955), Chilean lawyer and politician
- Joan Ayling (1907–1993), British artist
- Jon Ayling (born 1967), English cricketer
- Louise Ayling (born 1987), New Zealand rower
- Luke Ayling (born 1991), English footballer
- Robert Ayling (born 1946), British businessman, former chief executive of British Airways
- Robert Ayling (cricketer), English cricketer known to have played two matches in 1796
- Rose Ayling-Ellis (born 1994), English actress
- William Ayling (1766–1826), English cricketer
- William Ayling (judge) (1867–1946), English judge
