= Gardom =

Gardom is a surname. Notable people with the surname include:

- Garde Gardom (1924–2013), Canadian politician and lawyer
- Keith Gardom (born 1952), English cricketer
- William Gardom (1884—1944), Anglo-Argentine cricket player

== See also ==
- Gardam
- Gardom's Edge, an area in Derbyshire, England
