= Harold Dods =

English cricketer

Personal information
- Full name: Harold Dodds
- Born: 25 March 1909; Gosberton, Lincolnshire, England
- Died: 18 June 1944 (aged 35); Guards Chapel, Wellington Barracks, London, England
- Batting: Left-handed

Domestic team information
- Years: Team
- 1927–1939: Lincolnshire
- 1936–1938: Minor Counties

Career statistics
Competition	First-class
Matches	3
Runs scored	172
Batting average	34.40
100s/50s	1/–
Top score	104
Catches/stumpings	–/–
- Source: Cricinfo, 25 May 2012

Harold Williams Dods (25 March 1909 – 18 June 1944) was an English cricketer. Dods was a left-handed batsman. The only son of Harold (who played minor counties cricket for Lincolnshire) and Florence Dods, he was born at Gosberton, Lincolnshire, and was educated at Tonbridge School.

Dods made his debut for Lincolnshire against the Nottinghamshire Second XI in the 1927 Minor Counties Championship. He played minor counties cricket for Lincolnshire from 1927 to 1939, making a total of 86 appearances, the last of which came against Cambridgeshire. In 1936, he was selected to play for a combined Minor Counties cricket team in a first-class match against Oxford University at the University Parks, making scores of 9 and 22, while being twice dismissed by Richard West. He toured Argentina with Sir TEW Brinckman's XI in late 1937 and early 1938, making a single first-class appearance on the tour against the Argentine national team at the Belgrano Athletic Club in Buenos Aires. He scored a century in the Brinckman XIs' first-innings, making 104 runs before he was dismissed by K. S. Bush. Later in 1938, he made a second first-class appearance for the Minor Counties, once more against Oxford University at the University Parks. He made scores of 30 in the Minor Counties first-innings, before being dismissed by Edward Scott, while in their second-innings he was run out for 7.

With World War II ending county cricket, Dods enlisted into the British Army, serving during the war with the Scots Guards. He was killed on 18 June 1944, when a German V-1 flying bomb hit the Guards Chapel at Wellington Barracks in Westminster, one of 121 fatalities in the attack. At the time of his death he held the rank of Lieutenant. Months earlier he had married Marigold Bird at Sleaford, Lincolnshire. He is buried at Donington, Lincolnshire.
