= George Ferguson (cricketer) =

Argentine cricketer

Personal information
- Full name: George William Ferguson
- Born: 17 September 1912; Buenos Aires, Argentina
- Died: 1995 (aged 82–83); Argentina
- Batting: Right-handed
- Bowling: Unknown
- Role: Middle order batsman
- Relatives: Tony Ferguson (son); Pablo Ferguson (grandson); Alejandro Ferguson (grandson)

Domestic team information
- Years: Team
- 1929/30–37/38: Argentina
- 1932: South Americans
- First-class debut: 18 March 1930 Argentina v Sir J Cahn's XI
- Last First-class: 15 January 1938 Argentina v Sir TEW Brinckman's XI

Career statistics
Competition	First-class
Matches	12
Runs scored	445
Batting average	19.34
100s/50s	0/2
Top score	85
Balls bowled	6
Wickets	0
Bowling average	–
5 wickets in innings	0
10 wickets in match	0
Best bowling	0/1
Catches/stumpings	9/–
- Source: CricketArchive, 23 July 2010

George William Ferguson (September 17, 1912 – 1995) was a cricketer who played for Argentina in first-class matches between 1930 and 1938 against touring sides from England. He was also a member of the South American cricket team that toured England in 1932.

Ferguson was a right-handed middle-order batsman. He first appeared for Argentina as a 17-year-old in three matches against Sir Julien Cahn's XI in early 1930: though his highest score was only 22, he averaged almost 17 runs an innings.

On the 1932 tour, he played in all six first-class matches and had success in the first and the last. Against Oxford University he made 85 with a five and 11 fours, and added 159 in 130 minutes with Henry Marshal, who made 153. That score was to prove his career highest in first-class matches, but he also passed 50 in the final match, against Scotland, when his 60 was the top score in the match for the South American team. On the tour as a whole, he made 264 runs at an average of 24 in the first-class games, and 484 runs, average 25.47, in all matches, with a highest of 95.

His final three first-class matches were in the 1937-38 season for Argentina against Sir Theodore Brinckman's XI, a touring team of English county cricketers led by R. E. S. Wyatt. He had limited success in these matches, with a highest score of just 36.

In non-first-class cricket, Ferguson represented Argentina against a touring MCC as late as 1959, and he represented South of Argentina against North of Argentina in the annual match most years between the 1929-30 season and the 1965-66 season. In his last game at this level, he was joined by his son, Tony Ferguson whose own two sons, Pablo Ferguson and Alejandro Ferguson have represented Argentina in ICC Trophy matches in the early 21st century.

GWA Ferguson

(son),

A Ferguson

(grandson),

Pablo Ferguson
