= Thomas Fitton =

Anglo-Irish cricketer and Royal Air Force officer

- Born: Thomas Edmond John Fitton; 16 August 1911; Killarney, Ireland
- Died: 31 August 2000 (aged 89); Devon, England
- Military career
- Allegiance: United Kingdom
- Branch: Royal Air Force
- Service years: 1935–1966
- Rank: Air commodore
- Commands: Director of Mechanical Engineering 1 RAF
- Conflicts: Second World War
- Cricket career

Cricket information
- Batting: Right-handed
- Bowling: Right-arm medium-fast

Domestic team information
- Years: Team
- 1932: Oxford University

Career statistics
Competition	First-class
Matches	1
Runs scored	7
Batting average	–
100s/50s	–/–
Top score	4*
Balls bowled	156
Wickets	2
Bowling average	38.00
5 wickets in innings	–
10 wickets in match	–
Best bowling	2/76
Catches/stumpings	–/–
- Source: Thomas Fitton at Cricinfo

Thomas Edmond John Fitton CBE (16 August 1911 – 31 August 2000), known as John, was an Anglo-Irish first-class cricketer and Royal Air Force officer.

== Life ==
Fitton was born in Ireland at Killarney in August 1911. He was educated in England at Trent College, before going up to Brasenose College, Oxford. While studying at Oxford, he made a single appearance in first-class cricket for Oxford University against the touring South Americans at Oxford in 1932. Fitton was unbeaten in both Oxford innings', with scores of 4 and 3 respectively. He also took two wickets with his right-arm medium-fast bowling in the South Americans first innings, dismissing Dennet Ayling and Cyril Ayling.

=== Military career ===
After graduating from Oxford, Fitton joined the Royal Air Force as a pilot officer on probation in October 1935. From April 1936–September 1937, he was a pilot with 43 Squadron, before becoming a flight instructor in September 1937. He was promoted to flying officer in April 1938, before being granted the acting rank of flight lieutenant in April 1939 before relinquishing rank in August 1939. Fitton transferred to the Technical Branch in April 1940, at which point he held the full rank of flight lieutenant. He was granted the temporary ranks of squadron leader in June 1941 and wing commander in June 1942. In November 1942, he was made a full squadron leader, antedated to June 1941.

Following the war, he was promoted to wing commander in July 1947, before being promoted to group captain in July 1953. Fitton became the deputy director of the Technical Services in September 1958, He was promoted to air commodore in July 1961, with Fitton being made an CBE in the 1962 New Year Honours. In June 1963, he was appointed director of mechanical engineering with 1 RAF. He retired from active service in August 1966. Fitton died in Devon in August 2000.

=== Personal life ===
Fitton was married to Ruth Trewyn, née Oliver. They had one son.
