= International cricket in 1937–38 =

International cricket season

The 1937–38 international cricket season was from September 1937 to April 1938. The season consisted of several first-class international tours.

== Season overview ==
International tours
Start date	Home team	Away team	Results [Matches]			
Start date	Home team	Away team	Test	ODI	FC	LA
5 November 1937	Australia	New Zealand	—	—	3–0 [3]	—
13 November 1937	India	England	—	—	2–3 [5]	—
26 December 1937	Argentina	England	—	—	1–1 [3]	—

== November ==
=== New Zealand in Australia ===
First-class Series
No.	Date	Home captain	Away captain	Venue	Result
Match 1	5–8 November	(South Australia) Donald Bradman	Curly Page	Adelaide Oval, Adelaide	South Australia by 10 wickets
Match 2	12–16 November	(Victoria (state)) Hans Ebeling	Tom Lowry	Melbourne Cricket Ground, Melbourne	Victoria by 5 wickets
Match 3	19–22 November	(New South Wales) Stan McCabe	Giff Vivian	Sydney Cricket Ground, Sydney	New South Wales by 8 wickets

=== England in India ===
Three-day Match
No.	Date	Home captain	Away captain	Venue	Result
Match 1	13–16 November	Vijay Merchant	Lord Tennyson	Bagh-e-Jinnah, Lahore	Lord Tennyson's XI by 9 wickets
Match 2	11–14 December	Vijay Merchant	Lord Tennyson	Brabourne Stadium, Bombay	Lord Tennyson's XI by 6 wickets
Match 3	31 Dec–3 January	Vijay Merchant	Lord Tennyson	Eden Gardens, Calcutta	India by 93 runs
Match 4	5–7 February	Vijay Merchant	Lord Tennyson	Madras Cricket Club Ground, Madras	India by an innings and 6 runs
Match 5	12–14 February	Vijay Merchant	Lord Tennyson	Brabourne Stadium, Bombay	Lord Tennyson's XI by 156 runs

== December ==
=== England in Argentina ===
Three-day Match Series
No.	Date	Home captain	Away captain	Venue	Result
Match 1	26–28 December	Alfred Jackson	Theodore Brinckman	Belgrano Athletic Club Ground, Buenos Aires	Brinckman's Team by 2 wickets
Match 2	8–10 January	Alfred Jackson	Theodore Brinckman	Hurlingham Club Ground, Buenos Aires	All Argentine by 222 runs
Match 3	17–17 January	Alfred Jackson	Theodore Brinckman	Belgrano Athletic Club Ground, Buenos Aires	Match drawn
