= Alejandro Ferguson =

Argentine cricketer

Alec Ferguson
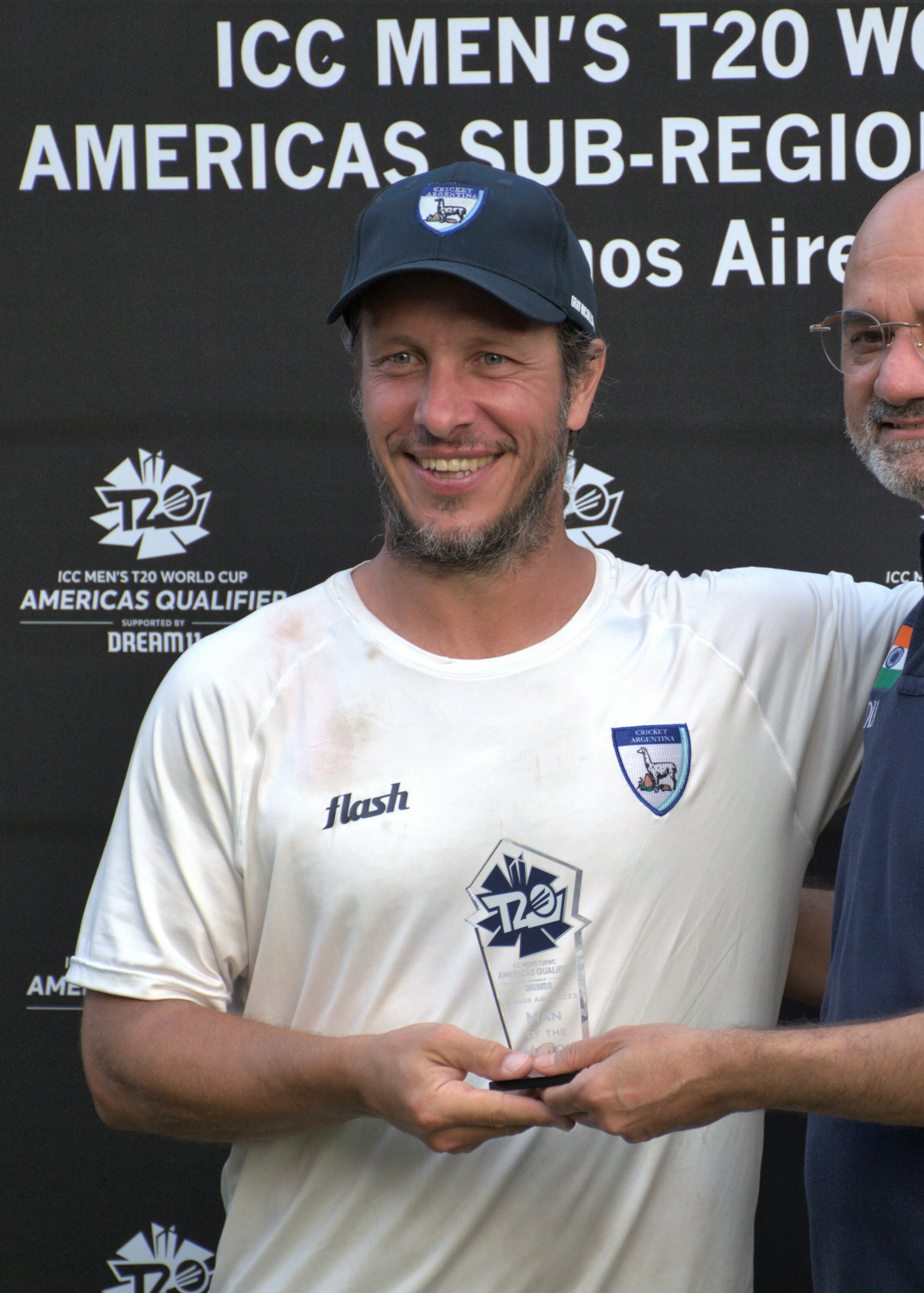

Personal information
- Full name: Alejandro Ferguson
- Born: 19 July 1978 (age 48); Buenos Aires, Argentina
- Batting: Right-handed
- Bowling: Right-arm medium
- Role: Wicket-keeper
- Relatives: Pablo Ferguson (brother); George Ferguson (grandfather)

International information
- National side: Argentina
- T20I debut (cap 6): 3 October 2019 v Mexico
- Last T20I: 16 December 2024 v Brazil

Career statistics
Competition	T20I	LA	T20
Matches	26	6	26
Runs scored	510	105	510
Batting average	34.00	21.00	34.00
100s/50s	0/3	0/1	0/3
Top score	86*	66*	86*
Catches/stumpings	8/–	8/–	8/–
- Source: Cricinfo, 17 May 2025

Alejandro "Alec" Ferguson (born July 19, 1978) is an Argentine cricketer. He is a right-handed batsman and wicket-keeper who has played for Argentina since 1994.

== International career ==
Ferguson made his debut as a fifteen-year-old lower-middle order batsman, though he averaged merely five with the bat throughout the tournament, as Argentina finished third in their Plate Group.

Seven years later, Ferguson was selected for the 2001 ICC Trophy tournament, where he played two matches for the team. He played in Division Two of the 2006 World Cricket League Americas Region in April. Ferguson was named the Division Two wicket-keeper of the tournament, following five catches and one stumping in four matches which made him the most successful Argentine fielder of the tournament.

He appeared in Division One of the same competition in August 2006, though he could not stop Argentina finishing winless and bottom of the table. Ferguson is an upper-middle order batsman and the first-choice wicket-keeper for the team.

In September 2019, he was named in Argentina's Twenty20 International (T20I) squad for the men's tournament at the 2019 South American Cricket Championship. He made his T20I debut for Argentina, against Mexico, on 3 October 2019. In November 2021, he was named in Argentina's squad for the 2021 ICC Men's T20 World Cup Americas Qualifier tournament in Antigua. As of 2026, his international career is the longest of any current international cricketer, spanning 32 years.

== Personal life ==
His grandfather, George Ferguson, also played for Argentina and was a member of the South American cricket team that toured England in 1932, playing six first-class matches. His brother Pablo Ferguson has also represented Argentina internationally.
