= Richard Latham =

Brazilian cricketer

Personal information
- Full name: Richard Lockhart Latham
- Born: 5 January 1908; São Paulo, Brazil
- Died: 4 February 1953 (aged 45); São Paulo, Brazil
- Batting: Right-handed

International information
- National side: Brazil (1927–1929)

Career statistics
Competition	First-class
Matches	5
Runs scored	120
Batting average	15.00
100s/50s	0/1
Top score	58
Catches/stumpings	6/–
- Source: CricketArchive, 14 January 2015

Richard Lockhart Latham (5 January 1908 – 4 February 1953) was a Brazilian cricketer who played a number of international matches for the Brazilian national side. In 1932, he toured England with a combined South American team, making five first-class appearances on tour. Latham has been described as "arguably the best cricketer ever to represent Brazil".

Latham was born in São Paulo, but was sent to England to be educated, attending Repton School. His father, L. F. Latham, had played club cricket for the São Paulo Athletic Club. Latham himself made his international debut during the 1927–28 season, aged 19, when Brazil visited Buenos Aires to play a three-match series against the Argentine national team. He opened the batting in all three games, scoring a century (116) in the second match and a half-century (71) in the third. Argentina returned the tour in mid-1929, played two games in São Paulo and one in Niterói. In the first of those games, Latham scored 105 and 100 as Brazil won by 186 runs. He consequently became the first player from a non-Test-playing country to score centuries in both innings of an international match.

Along with Arthur Grass and Ronald Pryor, Latham was one of only three Brazilians (out of a fifteen-man squad) to be named in the composite South American team that toured the British Isles during the 1932 season. He went on to play in five of the six first-class matches on tour, generally opening the batting with Argentina's Henry Marshal, and also featured in most of the minor fixtures. Latham's highest score during the first-class portion of the tour was an innings of 58 against Scotland, which came from third in the batting order. In the other matches, he recorded three more half-centuries – 68 against the Affiliated South American Banks team, 65 against the Richmond Cricket Club, and 86 against the Gentlemen of Surrey. Latham died in São Paulo in February 1953, aged only 45.
