= Gerard Simpson =

Personal information
- Full name: Gerard Amyatt Simpson
- Born: 30 March 1886; Trinity, Edinburgh, Scotland
- Died: 22 February 1957 (aged 70); Chartham, Kent, England
- Role: Batsman

International information
- National side: Argentina (1911)

Domestic team information
- Years: Team
- 1929–1931: Kent

Career statistics
Competition	First-class
Matches	4
Runs scored	50
Batting average	10.00
100s/50s	0/0
Top score	26
Catches/stumpings	0/–
- Source: CricketArchive, 16 January 2015

Gerard Amyatt Simpson (30 March 1886 – 22 February 1957) was a Scottish-born cricketer whose four-match first-class career spanned from 1911 to 1931.

== Early life ==
Born in Trinity, Edinburgh, Simpson emigrated to Argentina as a young man, becoming one of the many British expatriate workers in South America at the time.

== Cricket career ==
=== Early career in Argentina ===
Simpson made his debut in Argentine cricket's annual "North v South" match during the 1906–07 season, opening the batting for the North in both innings, alongside Lancastrian Harold Garnett.

=== First-class debut ===
When a Marylebone Cricket Club (MCC) team toured Argentina during the 1911–12 season, Simpson played a single first-class match for Argentina. He came in fifth in Argentina's first innings, scoring 26 runs, and was promoted to third in the second innings, behind openers Neville Jackson and Evelyn Toulmin, scoring another 10 runs before being run out. That match, played at the Hurlingham Club Ground, was the first of three Argentina–MCC fixtures played on the tour.

=== First world war and continued cricket ===
During the First World War, Simpson continued playing in North v South fixtures in Argentina, and also appeared for Rosario Athletic Club in the Argentine Cricket Championship. Simpson also appeared twice more for Argentina in the 1921–22 season, when Brazil toured the country. While in England in 1922, he appeared in a single match for the Kent County Cricket Club's second XI, which at the time played in the Minor Counties Championship (the Second XI Championship not being established until 1959). Simpson's last recorded match in Argentina came during the 1922–23 season. He did, however, represent an "Anglo-Argentine XI" in England in 1926, in a match against the MCC at Lord's.

=== Later career ===
During the 1929 season, aged 43, Simpson played two County Championship matches for Kent – one against Yorkshire at Bramall Lane and one against Lancashire at Old Trafford. There was consequently a gap of 17 years, three months, and 14 days between his first and second first-class appearances. Simpson's fourth and final first-class match came two seasons later, against Lancashire in the 1931 County Championship, by which time he was 45 years old. He was at that stage a regular for Kent's second XI, and continued playing for them after the Second World War, despite having turned 60 during the war. Overall, Simpson played 138 Minor Counties Championship matches for the Kent Second XI, with his final match coming against Devon in August 1949, when he was 63.

== Military service ==
Simpson briefly returned to Britain during the First World War, where he served as a second lieutenant in the Royal Field Artillery.

== Death ==
Simpson died in Chartham in February 1957, aged 70.

== Bibliography ==
- Carlaw, Derek (2020). Kent County Cricketers, A to Z: Part Two (1919–1939) (PDF). Cardiff: ACS.
