= Neville Jackson =

Neville Jackson may refer to:

- Neville Jackson, pseudonym of Gerald Glaskin, Australian author
- Neville Jackson (cricketer), Anglo-Argentine cricketer
