= De Courcy Lyons =

De Courcy Lyons may refer to:

- Algernon Islay de Courcy Lyons, Welsh photographer, novelist and linguist
- de Courcy Lyons (cricketer), Argentine cricketer
