= Ronald Pryor =

Brazilian cricketer

Personal information
- Full name: Ronald MacDonell Pryor
- Born: 23 April 1901; Rio de Janeiro, Brazil
- Died: 24 December 1977 (aged 76); Brazil
- Bowling: Slow left-arm orthodox

International information
- National side: Brazil (1921–1929)

Career statistics
Competition	First-class
Matches	1
Runs scored	0
Batting average	0.00
100s/50s	0/0
Top score	0
Balls bowled	30
Wickets	0
Bowling average	–
5 wickets in innings	–
10 wickets in match	–
Best bowling	–
Catches/stumpings	0/–
- Source: ESPMCricinfo, 14 January 2015

Ronald MacDonell Pryor (23 April 1901 – 24 December 1977) was a Brazilian cricketer who played a number of international matches for the Brazilian national side. In 1932, he toured England with a combined South American team, making a single first-class appearance on tour.

Pryor was born in Rio de Janeiro, but was sent to England to be educated, attending Tonbridge School. He played cricket for the school team in 1918 and 1919, with the latter season included a match against Clifton College at Lord's. Pryor made his international debut for Brazil in December 1921, aged 20, when he played a three-match series the Argentine national team in Buenos Aires. In the second of those matches, he took a maiden five-wicket haul, 5/59, in Argentina's first innings (and 8/114 for the match), which was followed by 4/78 in the first innings of the next match. Argentina returned the tour in mid-1922, with Pryor again taking a five-wicket haul, 5/28 in the match at Niterói.

Along with Arthur Grass and Richard Latham, Pryor was one of only three Brazilians (out of a fifteen-man squad) to be named in the composite South American team that toured the British Isles during the 1932 season. He went on to play in only one of the six first-class matches on tour, which came against the British Army cricket team. In the match, played at the Officers Club Services Ground in Aldershot, Pryor bowled only five overs, all in the first innings, and went wicketless while conceding 13 runs. While batting, he came in last in the batting order in both innings, and recorded a pair. Pryor also had little success in the minor matches on tour. Out of the six matches in which he played, he took multiple wickets only twice – 1/15 and 2/45 against a Civil Service team, and 2/80 and 0/24 against a Gentlemen of Surrey side. The 1929 series against Argentina had been his last recorded series for Brazil. Pryor died in December 1977, aged 76.
