= John Knox (cricketer) =

Argentine cricketer

Personal information
- Full name: John Knox
- Born: 4 October 1904; Buenos Aires, Argentina
- Died: 10 April 1966 (aged 61); Buenos Aires, Argentina
- Batting: Right-handed
- Bowling: Unknown

Career statistics
Competition	First-class
Matches	12
Runs scored	575
Batting average	31.94
100s/50s	1/2
Top score	110*
Balls bowled	138
Wickets	1
Bowling average	87.00
5 wickets in innings	–
10 wickets in match	–
Best bowling	1/46
Catches/stumpings	9/–
- Source: Cricinfo, 20 June 2019

John Knox (4 October 1904 – 10 April 1966) was an Argentine first-class cricketer.

Knox, of Scottish-descent, was born at Buenos Aires in October 1904. He made his debut in first-class cricket for Argentina against the touring Marylebone Cricket Club at Buenos Aires in December 1926, with Knox playing a further four first-class matches against the same opposition the following month. He played two first-class matches for Argentina against a touring Sir J. Cahn's XI in 1930. He was a member of the South American cricket team which toured England in 1932, making five first-class appearances on the tour. His final first-class appearance came for Argentina against Sir T. E. W. Brinckman's XI in 1938. Across twelve first-class matches, Knox scored 575 runs at an average of 31.94, with a high score of 110 not out. This score, which was his only first-class century, came for the South Americans against Sussex. He died at Buenos Aires in April 1966.
