= Frederick Keen =

Frederick Keen may refer to:

- Frederick Kerr (Frederick Grinham Keen, 1858–1933), English actor
- Frederick Keen (cricketer) (1898–1990), Argentine first-class cricketer
