= Robert Stuart (cricketer) =

Argentine cricketer

Personal information
- Full name: Robert Livingstone Stuart
- Born: 30 December 1908; Buenos Aires, Argentina
- Died: 6 June 1986 (aged 77); Buenos Aires, Argentina
- Batting: Right-handed
- Bowling: Right-arm medium

Career statistics
Competition	First-class
Matches	9
Runs scored	405
Batting average	25.31
100s/50s	1/–
Top score	133
Balls bowled	84
Wickets	1
Bowling average	58.00
5 wickets in innings	–
10 wickets in match	–
Best bowling	1/35
Catches/stumpings	4/–
- Source: Cricinfo, 20 June 2019

Robert Livingstone Stuart (30 December 1908 – 6 June 1986) was an Argentine first-class cricketer.

Stuart was born at Buenos Aires in June 1908. From there he was sent to England, where he was at Highgate School from January 1920. Unusually, he played for the school's cricket 1st XI for five years (1923-1927, the last year as captain); for three of these teams he played alongside R.W.V.Robins, for three with 'Tagge' Webster and two with Howard Fabian. After attending Highgate, he returned to Argentina. He made his debut in first-class cricket for Argentina against a touring Sir J. Cahn's XI in at Buenos Aires in 1930. He was a member of the South American cricket team which toured England in 1932, making five first-class appearances on the tour. His final first-class appearance came for Argentina against a touring Sir T. E. W. Brinckman's XI in 1938. Stuart appeared in a total of nine first-class matches, scoring 405 runs at an average of 25.31. His top-score of 133 came against the British Army cricket team in 1932.

He later served in the British Army with the Scots Guards during the Second World War, having been commissioned as a second lieutenant in November 1941. He was mentioned in dispatches in November 1945, having been promoted to the rank of lieutenant at some point prior to this. He relinquished his commission in June 1946, at which point he was granted the honorary rank of captain. He died at Buenos Aires in June 1986.
