= Old Denstonians =

Alumni of Denstone College

Denstone College is an independent, coeducational boarding school in Denstone, Staffordshire, England. Its alumni are known as Old Denstonians (ODs). The Denstone Association looks after the college's alumni.

== Old Denstonians ==
- Peter Brinson – writer and lecturer on dance
- Sir Vandeleur Molyneux Grayburn – Chief Manager of the HSBC Bank and member of the Hong Kong Resistance who died a prisoner of the Japanese in 1943
- Nigel Grindley FRS - Emeritus Professor in Genetics, Yale University.
- Peter Gerald "Spam" Hammersley CB OBE – Rear Admiral, Royal Navy
- Frederick George Jackson – Arctic explorer
- John Makepeace OBE – furniture designer
- Keith Mant – forensic pathologist and war crime investigator
- William Whitehead Watts – President of the Geological Society (1910–1912)
- Lieutenant General Ralph Wooddisse – British Army officer

=== Churchmen ===
- Charles Copland – clergyman
- Philip Pasterfield – Bishop of Crediton (1974–1984)
- Dennis Victor – Bishop of Lebombo

=== Politicians and lawyers ===
- Geoffrey Cheshire FBA – barrister and jurist
- Warren Hawksley – Conservative Member of Parliament
- Asda Jayanama – diplomat
- Lord Justice Kay – Lord Justice of Appeal
- Alfred F. Adderley - Bahamian lawyer, Member of Parliament and acting Chief Justice of the Supreme Court

=== Sportsmen ===
- Arthur Berry – England footballer, double Olympic gold medallist and former Chairman of Liverpool Football Club
- Phil Davies – rugby player
- Alastair Hignell – rugby union and cricket player
- Harvey Hosein – English cricketer
- N. F. Humphreys – 1910 British Lions player (died in World War I)
- Tommy Kemp – rugby union fly half for England 1931–1948
- Sam Lewis – rugby union lock/flanker for Leicester Tigers
- Tim Mason – cricketer
- David Short – Derbyshire cricketer
- Jeremy Snape – England cricketer
- George Stocks – Argentine cricketer
- Alex Thomson (cricketer) - cricketer
- Ben White – rugby union scrum half for Leicester Tigers

=== Writers and broadcasters ===
- Quentin Crisp – writer and actor
- René Cutforth – journalist
- Alex Lester – broadcaster
- Petre Mais (S. P. B. Mais) – author and broadcaster
- Tim Marlow – writer, broadcaster and art historian
- Richard Morris – archaeologist and writer
- Guy Thorne – pseudonym: Cyril Arthur Edward Justice Waggoner Ranger Gull, (1876–1923), novelist and journalist
- Bill Arthur - Sky Sports journalist and broadcaster

=== Musicians ===
- Peter Godfrey – choral conductor

== See also ==
- Category:People educated at Denstone College.
