= Launcelot Ward =

English soldier and cricketer

Personal information
- Full name: Launcelot Edward Seth Ward
- Born: 7 August 1875; Apsley, Hertfordshire, England
- Died: 27 August 1929 (aged 54); Lambeth, London, England
- Batting: Right-handed
- Role: Batsman
- Relatives: Frederick Keen (son-in-law)

Domestic team information
- Years: Team
- 1913–1920: Somerset
- FC debut: 26 May 1913 Somerset v Kent
- Last FC: 3 June 1920 Somerset v Oxford University

Career statistics
Competition	First-class
Matches	3
Runs scored	18
Batting average	3.60
100s/50s	0/0
Top score	11
Catches/stumpings	0/–
- Source: CricketArchive, 18 November 2013

Launcelot Edward Seth Ward CMG, DSO (7 August 1875 – 27 August 1929) was a career soldier who commanded the First Battalion of the King's African Rifles in the First World War in East Africa. He also played first-class cricket for Somerset County Cricket Club between 1913 and 1920. He was born at Apsley, Hertfordshire and died at Lambeth, London.

In cricket databases he is referred to as "Lancelot"; the death notice placed by his family and the obituary in The Times in 1929 both give his name as "Launcelot".

== Background and education ==
Ward was the fourth son of the Reverend Percival Seth Ward who, at the time of Launcelot's birth, was vicar of Apsley End, Hertfordshire, and was later a vicar in Worcestershire. He was educated at Felsted School.

== Military career ==
Ward joined the Oxfordshire Light Infantry from school and was commissioned a second lieutenant on 1 December 1897. He saw active service in India, where he took part in the Tirah Campaign under Sir William Lockhart 1897–98, and was promoted a lieutenant on 28 October 1898 . In April 1902 he was seconded for service under Foreign office, and joined the King's East African Rifles in Uganda. He later transferred to this regiment, eventually commanding the regiment and, at the start of the First World War, being in charge of all forces in East Africa. He held the rank of Lieutenant-Colonel but was made an acting brigadier-general in operations in Western Europe later in the War, being twice wounded and twice mentioned in dispatches. He retired from the Army at the end of the war and from 1924 to 1929 was ADC to the Governor-General of Nyasaland, Sir Charles Calvert Bowring; his obituary states that he had bought property in what is now Malawi and was intending to retire there, but he died after an operation in London.

== Cricket career ==
Ward was stated to be "a keen cricketer, and played for All-India, M. C. C. and the Free Foresters". He played three times in first-class cricket for Somerset: once as a middle-order batsman in a single County Championship match in 1913, and then twice as a lower-order batsman in back-to-back games against the first-class universities in 1920. He reached double figures just once in five first-class innings.
