= Rollo O'Dwyer =

Argentine cricketer

Personal information
- Full name: Rollo Gillespie O'Dwyer
- Born: 23 March 1900; Gualesquay, Argentina
- Died: 17 September 1964 (aged 64); Gral Galarea, Entre Ríos, Argentina
- Batting: Right-handed
- Role: Wicket-keeper

Career statistics
Competition	First-class
Matches	3
Runs scored	4
Batting average	9.00
100s/50s	–/–
Top score	9*
Catches/stumpings	4/2
- Source: Cricinfo, 26 September 2021

Rollo Gillespie O'Dwyer (23 March 1900 – 17 September 1964) was an Argentine first-class cricketer.

O'Dwyer was born at Gualesquay in March 1900 and was educated in England at Rugby School. In March 1919, five months after the end of the First World War, O'Dwyer was commissioned as a second lieutenant in the 5th Reserve Regiment. Later returning to Argentina, he made three appearances in first-class cricket in March 1930 for Argentina against Sir Julien Cahn's personal eleven, which was touring South America. The three-match series was won 1–0 by the tourists, with two matches ending in a draw. Playing as a wicket-keeper, he took 4 catches and made 2 stumpings across the series. O'Dwyer died in hospital at Gral Galarea in Entre Ríos Province in September 1964.
