= James Paul (cricketer) =

Argentine cricketer (1888–1937)

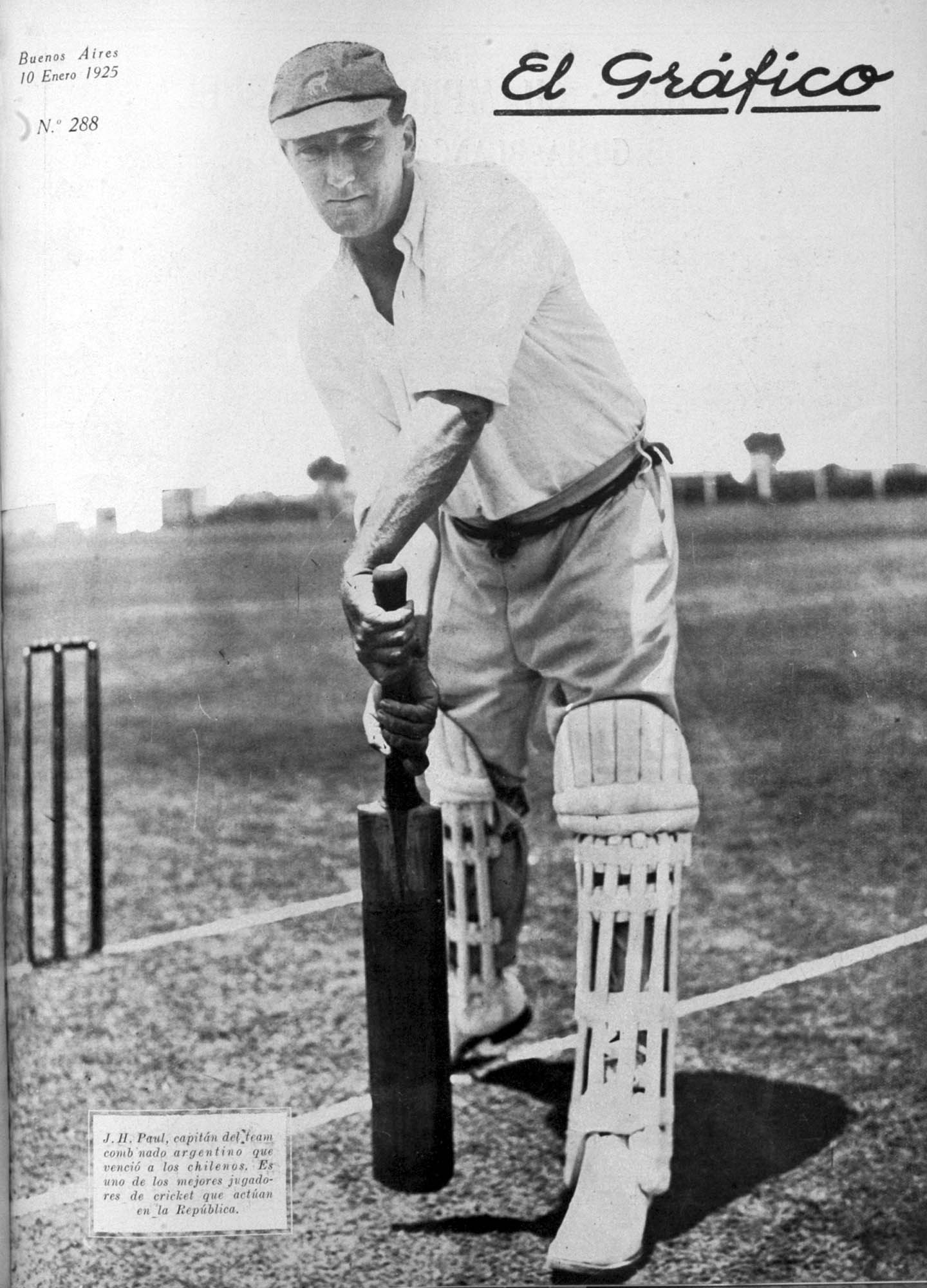

Personal information
- Full name: James Hugh Paul
- Born: 10 February 1888; Argentina
- Died: 27 February 1937 (aged 49); Earlswood, Surrey, England
- Batting: Right-handed
- Bowling: Unknown

Career statistics
Competition	First-class
Matches	9
Runs scored	272
Batting average	18.13
100s/50s	–/–
Top score	39
Balls bowled	627
Wickets	9
Bowling average	35.00
5 wickets in innings	–
10 wickets in match	–
Best bowling	2/23
Catches/stumpings	2/–
- Source: Cricinfo, 20 June 2019

James Hugh Paul (10 February 1888 – 27 February 1937) was an Argentine first-class cricketer.

Though born in Argentina, his family moved to England where he was educated at Malvern College. Returning to Argentina, he later made his debut in first-class cricket for Argentina against the touring Marylebone Cricket Club at Buenos Aires in 1926. He played a further first-class match for Argentina against a touring Sir J. Cahn's XI in 1930, before touring England with the South American cricket team in 1932, making five first-class appearances on the tour. He later played two first-class matches in England for H. D. G. Leveson Gower's XI against Oxford University at Eastbourne in 1935 and 1937. In nine first-class matches, Paul scored 272 run at an average of 18.13, with a high score of 39. With the ball he took 9 wickets with best figures of 2 for 23. He died in England at Earlswood in February 1937.
