= John Jackson (cricketer, born 1898) =

John Jackson CBE
Personal information
- Full name: John Alfred Stewart Jackson
- Born: 27 December 1898; Valparaíso, Chile
- Died: 13 March 1958 (aged 59); Santiago, Chile
- Batting: Right-handed
- Bowling: Right-arm leg break

International information
- National side: Chile (1922–1938)

Domestic team information
- Years: Team
- 1920: Cambridge University
- 1920: Somerset

Career statistics
Competition	First-class
Matches	19
Runs scored	739
Batting average	22.39
100s/50s	1/3
Top score	106
Balls bowled	42
Wickets	0
Bowling average	–
5 wickets in innings	–
10 wickets in match	–
Best bowling	–
Catches/stumpings	1/–
- Source: CricketArchive, 25 May 2020

John Alfred Stewart Jackson CBE (27 December 1898 – 13 March 1958) was a Chilean-British cricketer and school founder.

A right-handed batsman and right-arm leg spin bowler, he played seven times for the Chile national cricket team against Argentina between 1922 and 1938. Earlier in his career, he played county cricket for Somerset.

== Playing career ==
Jackson was educated at Cheltenham College, then served in the Rifle Brigade during World War I. After the war he went up to Jesus College, Cambridge. In the 1920 English cricket season while at Cambridge University, he made his first-class debut playing against Cambridge University for Somerset. He then played four matches for the university side, but did not gain his blue in their annual match against Oxford University. He then played 13 County Championship matches for Somerset, in addition to one match for the Gentlemen of England against the Combined Services.

Back in Chile, he first played for the national side in December 1922, playing twice against Argentina. He played five more times in matches against Argentina, his last match coming on 29 December 1938, when he found himself on the opposing side to his brother Alfred who was playing for Argentina and had also played for Chile earlier in his career.

=== Statistics ===
In first-class cricket, Jackson scored 739 runs at an average of 22.39. He scored one century, an innings of 106 for Somerset against Essex. Jackson also scored three half centuries.

== The Grange School ==
In 1928 Jackson founded the Grange School, Santiago, a boys' school on the English model (now co-educational). He ran the school for thirty years, until his death. For his services in Chile he was appointed OBE in the 1947 Birthday Honours and raised to CBE in the 1955 New Year Honours. In 2006, The Guardian listed the Grange School among the best British-curriculum international schools in the world.
