= Kenneth Henderson (cricketer) =

Anglo-Argentine cricketer and footballer

Personal information
- Full name: Kenneth Henderson
- Born: 1889; Argentina
- Died: 30 January 1973 (aged 83/84); Argentina
- Batting: Unknown

Career statistics
Competition	First-class
Matches	7
Runs scored	481
Batting average	37.00
100s/50s	–/4
Top score	85
Catches/stumpings	1/–
- Source: Cricinfo, 27 January 2022

Kenneth Henderson (1889 – 30 January 1973) was an Anglo-Argentine first-class cricketer.

Henderson was born in Argentina in 1889. He made his debut in first-class cricket for Argentina against the touring Marylebone Cricket Club (MCC) in December 1926, with him playing three further matches against them in January. Three years later he made a further three first-class appearances for Argentina against Sir Julien Cahn's XI in March 1930. Playing as a middle order batsman, he scored 481 runs in his seven first-class appearances, at an average of 37.00; he made four half centuries, with a highest score of 85 against Sir Julien Cahn's XI. Henderson died in Argentina in January 1973.
