= Cahn baronets =

Title in the Baronetage of the United Kingdom

The Cahn Baronetcy, of Stanford on Soar in the County of Nottingham, is a title in the Baronetage of the United Kingdom. It was created on 27 June 1934 for the businessman and cricket philanthropist Julien Cahn. As of 2021 the title is held by his grandson, the third Baronet, who succeeded in that year.

== Cahn baronets, of Stanford on Soar (1934) ==
- Sir Julien Cahn, 1st Baronet (1882–1944)
- Sir Albert Jonas Cahn, 2nd Baronet (1924–2021)
- Sir Julien Michael Cahn, 3rd Baronet (b. 1951)

The heir apparent in the current holder's son, Benjamin Albert Cahn (b. 1988)
