= Archibald Williamson (cricketer) =

Argentine-born English cricketer

Personal information
- Full name: Archibald Carmichael Williamson
- Born: 11 November 1892; Hurlingham, Buenos Aires Province, Argentina
- Died: 17 September 1972 (aged 79); Erdington, Warwickshire, England
- Batting: Right-handed
- Bowling: Right-arm fast-medium

Domestic team information
- Years: Team
- 1913: Oxford University
- 1913: Cheshire

Career statistics
Competition	First-class
Matches	1
Runs scored	18
Batting average	9.00
100s/50s	0/0
Top score	10
Catches/stumpings	0/–
- Source: Cricinfo, 27 February 2019

Archibald Carmichael Williamson (11 November 1892 – 17 September 1972) was an Argentine-born English first-class cricketer.

Williamson was born in the Anglo-Argentine neighbourhood of Hurlingham in Buenos Aires. He moved to United Kingdom as a child, where he was educated in Edinburgh at Fettes College. From there he went up to Brasenose College, Oxford. While at Oxford, Williamson made a single appearance in first-class cricket for Oxford University against Scotland at Oxford in 1913. Batting twice during the match, Williamson was dismissed for 8 runs by William Benskin, while in their second-innings he was dismissed for 10 runs by Robert Sievwright. He also played minor counties cricket for Cheshire in the same year, making one appearance against Lincolnshire.

At the start of the First World War, Williamson was enlisted in the Royal Garrison Artillery in August 1914 as a second lieutenant, but his appointment was cancelled in the same month. He instead enlisted with the Royal Navy in September 1914 as a sub-lieutenant. Williamson died at Highcroft Hospital in Birmingham in September 1972, with his death notice listing his profession as a retired schoolmaster.
