= Hurlingham, Buenos Aires =

City in Buenos Aires Province, Argentina

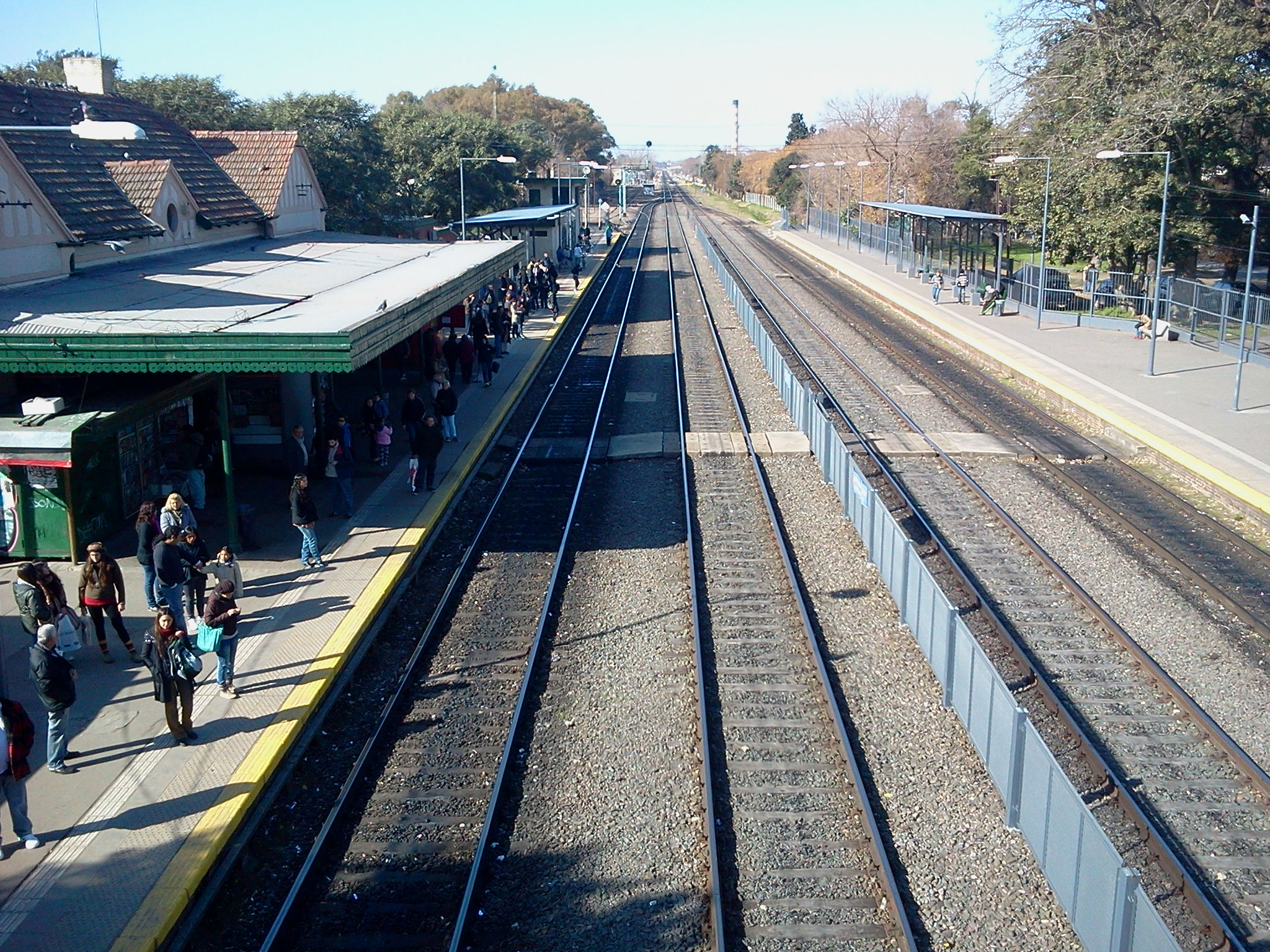
Hurlingham train station

Hurlingham is an Argentine city within the north-western part of Buenos Aires metropolitan area. It is the capital of the Hurlingham Partido in the province of Buenos Aires.

== History ==
Hurlingham has a long history that spans nearly 140 years. Since its founding, various ethnic groups have contributed to its history including those of British, German, Italian and Spanish descent. The city began with the foundation of the Hurlingham Club, a sports and social club created by the local Anglo-Argentine community, in 1888.

In December 1994, the municipality was formally created by Provincial Law Number 11,610. The town, located in the central-east region of Buenos Aires Province, is known for its green spaces, (golf research INTA, and the nearby Camino del Buen Ayre. In addition, the town is also known for being the youngest in Buenos Aires Province.

== Geography ==
=== Location ===
Hurlingham is located in the Greater Buenos Aires area. It is about 20 km from Argentina's capital city - Buenos Aires. It is bordered by the towns of Villa Tesei, William C. Morris, Buenos Aires and Ituzaingó Partido.

== Origin of name ==
The Hurlingham Club was founded in 1888 by the English community in the area, following the original Hurlingham Club, founded in Fulham, United Kingdom. According to the history of the Hurlingham Club, the name was inherited from Hurlingham House, home of the club's founder, originally built by Dr. William Cadogan in 1760.

== Sports ==
The town has three rugby clubs: Curupaytí, Hurling and El Retiro. All are associated with the Unión de Rugby de Buenos Aires. The Hurlingham Club is a centre for British sports, including cricket, golf and lawn tennis (having some of the very few grass courts in Latin America). The club is also home to polo and is one of the foremost clubs in Argentina and the world.

== Music ==
The city is the birthplace of some of the main rock bands of the country, such as Sumo, Divididos and Las Pelotas.

== Notable people ==
- Derek Mendl (1914–2001), first-class cricketer
- Jack Mendl (1911–2001), first-class cricketer
- Fausto Vera (born in 2000), footballer
- Archibald Williamson (1892-1972), first-class cricketer
- Ailín Pérez (born in 1994), UFC fighter and OnlyFans content creator
- Nehéun Pérez (born in 2000), footballer
- Dominic Miller (born in 1960), guitar player
- Augusto Batalla (born in 1996), footballer
