= The Grange School, Santiago =

The Grange School
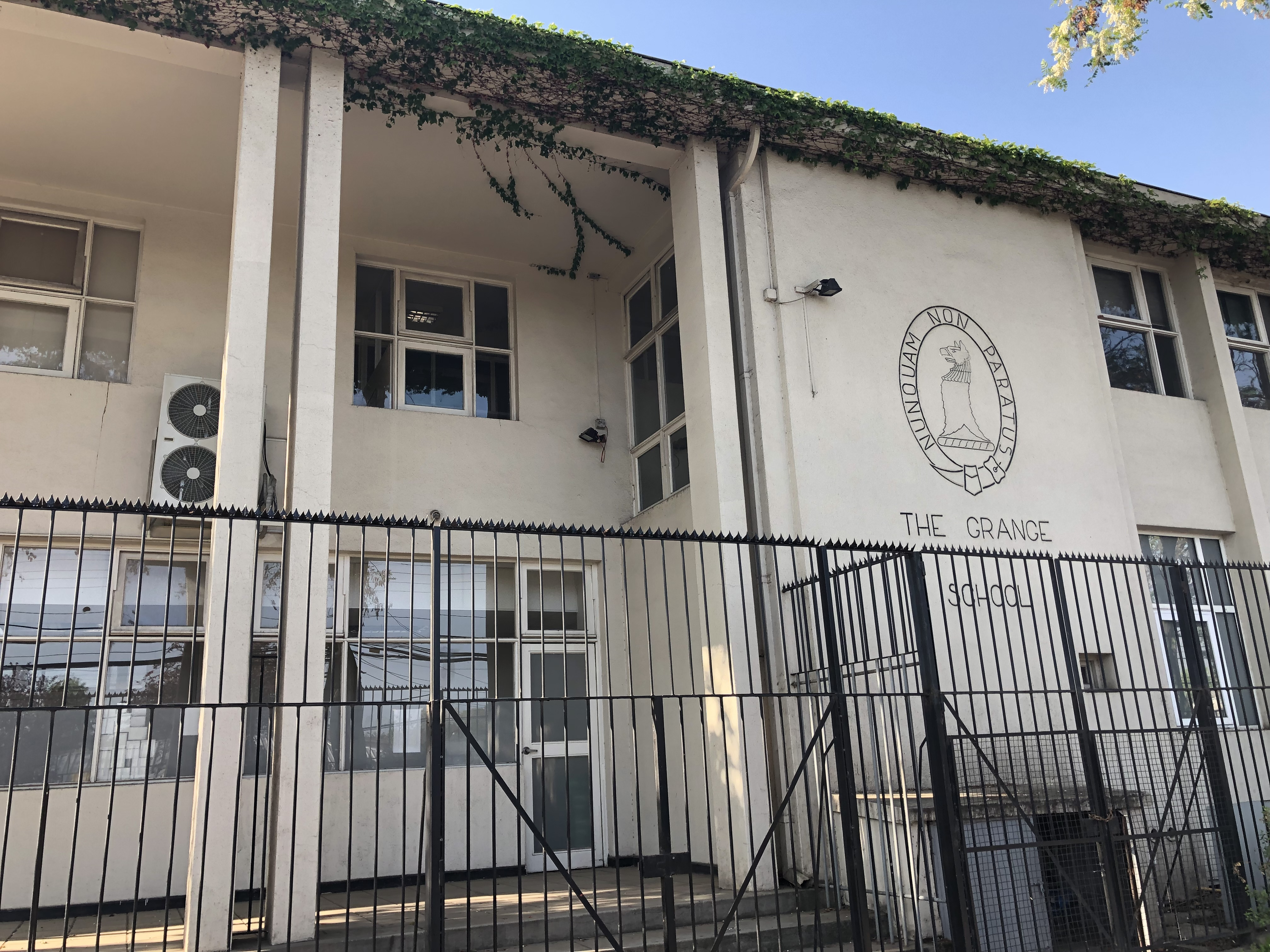

Location
- Avenida Príncipe de Gales 6154, La Reina Santiago; La Reina, Santiago Metropolitan Region; Chile
- Coordinates: 33°26′15″S 70°34′02″W

Information
- Type: Private School
- Motto: Nunquam Non Paratus
- Established: 1928
- Principal: Nicholas Eatough
- Teaching staff: 250
- Grades: Kinder-12
- Enrollment: ~2,200
- Student to teacher ratio: 8.8:1
- Alumni: Old Grangonians
- Website: http://www.grange.cl/

The Grange School is a private school in La Reina, Santiago, Chile. It was founded 4 June 1928, by John A. S. Jackson, an Anglo-Chilean born in Valparaíso and educated at Cheltenham College and at Cambridge University.

In 2006, the British newspaper The Guardian listed The Grange School as one of the best UK-curriculum international schools in the world.

The Grange School is a member of The Independent Association of Prep Schools, The Headmasters' and Headmistresses' Conference, The Latin American Heads Conference, and The Association of British Schools in Chile.

== Extracurricular Activities ==
The Grange School offers a total of 4 sports, 2 for girls and 2 for boys. Volleyball and field hockey are available to girls while boys can play rugby and football (soccer). Track and field competitions at the end of the year are available to both genders. During weekends, friendly matches are held against other schools belonging to The Association of British Schools in Chile. Teachers and students are split into 4 different 'colors' for school competitions.
