= Alfred Jackson (cricketer) =

Argentine/Chilean cricketer

Cricket information
- Batting: Right-handed
- Role: Wicket-keeper

International information
- National side: Argentina

Career statistics
Competition	First-class
Matches	8
Runs scored	349
Batting average	24.92
100s/50s	0/4
Top score	78
Catches/stumpings	3/1
- Source: CricketArchive, 16 November 2022

Alfred Louis Stewart Jackson (28 February 1904 – 23 July 1982) was an Argentine and Chilean cricketer. A right-handed batsman and wicket-keeper, he played for both Chile and Argentina, and also played first-class cricket for a combined South America side and for Argentina. His elder brother John played for Somerset as well as the Chilean national cricket team.

== Playing career ==
Jackson played one match for Chile, a three-day match against Argentina in 1925. Opening the batting with his brother, he scored 109 in the Chile first innings, but this was not enough to prevent Argentina winning by 320 runs.

He eventually moved to Argentina and played his first North v South match there in February 1932, a fixture he would play in nine times in total. In the 1932 English cricket season, he toured with a combined South American side, playing first-class matches against Oxford University, Leicestershire, Sir J Cahn's XI, Sussex and Scotland. He topped the batting averages on the tour, and his innings of 78 against Julien Cahn's XI was his highest career first-class score.

Returning to Argentina, he played three further first-class matches, this time for Argentina in 1937/38, against Sir TEW Brinckman's XI. Argentina drew the series 1-1, with Jackson captaining the Argentina team. He played his final internationals for Argentina on a tour of Chile in December 1938. Argentina won both matches, the second of which saw Jackson playing against his brother John, who was playing for Chile.
