= Charles Horsfall (cricketer) =

Anglo-Argentine cricketer, soldier, and airman

Personal information
- Full name: Charles Michael Horsfall
- Born: 9 November 1889; Weybridge, Surrey, England
- Died: 21 November 1942 (aged 53); Norwich, Norfolk, England
- Batting: Unknown

Career statistics
Competition	First-class
Matches	1
Runs scored	20
Batting average	10.00
100s/50s	–/–
Top score	20
Catches/stumpings	1/–
- Source: Cricinfo, 27 January 2022

Charles Michael Horsfall (9 November 1889 – 21 November 1942) was an Anglo-Argentine first-class cricketer and an officer in both the British Indian Army during the First World War, and the Royal Air Force Volunteer Reserve during the Second World War.

== Life ==
The son of Joseph and Sophia Horsfall, he was born in England at Weybridge in November 1889. He made a single appearance in first-class cricket for Argentina against the touring Marylebone Cricket Club at Buenos Aires in March 1912. Batting twice in the match, he was dismissed without scoring by Rockley Wilson, while in their second innings he was dismissed for 20 runs by Henry Baird.

Horsfall returned to England during the First World War and was commissioned as a second lieutenant into the British Indian Army in February 1915, before being promoted to lieutenant in January 1916.

He remained in the British Indian Army following the war and was promoted to captain in January 1919, before resigning from his commission in May 1922. While stationed in British India and British Ceylon, he played minor matches for the Europeans and for Dimbula and Dikoya in Ceylon.

He re-enlisted during the Second World War, being commissioned as a pilot officer in the Royal Air Force Volunteer Reserve in October 1939; at the time of his enlistment, he was aged 50, weighed 14 stone and has an abnormally high blood pressure. He served in an administrative and special duties role on the home front and was a special administrative officer at an airfield. He was promoted to flying officer in April 1940, with promotion to flight lieutenant following in March 1942. Horsfall died on 21 November 1942 at Norwich, while playing a game of squash. His cause of death was noted as a coronary thrombosis linked to his condition of arteriosclerosis.
