= Bill Ayling =

Australian rules footballer

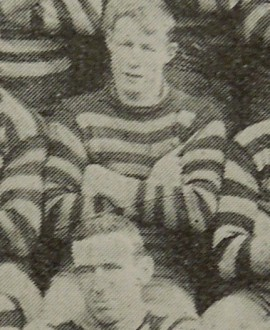
- Ayling in 1903

Personal information
- Full name: William Ayling
- Born: 26 July 1878; Mitcham, South Australia
- Died: 8 January 1950 (aged 71); Geraldton, Western Australia
- Original team: Port Melbourne
- Height: 178 cm (5 ft 10 in)
- Weight: 77 kg (170 lb)

Playing career^{1}
| Years | Club | Games (Goals) |
| 1903 | Collingwood | 2 (0) |
- ^{1} Playing statistics correct to the end of 1903.

William Ayling (26 July 1878 – 8 January 1950) was an Australian rules footballer who played with Collingwood in the Victorian Football League (VFL).
