= Derek Mendl =

Argentine cricketer (1914–2001)

Personal information
- Full name: Derek Francis Mendl
- Born: 1 August 1914; Hurlingham, Buenos Aires, Argentina
- Died: 18 July 2001 (aged 86); North Ryde, New South Wales, Australia
- Batting: Right-handed
- Relatives: Jack Mendl (brother)

Domestic team information
- Years: Team
- 1951: Marylebone Cricket Club

Career statistics
Competition	First-class
Matches	2
Runs scored	59
Batting average	14.75
100s/50s	–/–
Top score	26
Catches/stumpings	2/–
- Source: Cricinfo, 30 May 2019

Derek Francis Mendl (1 August 1914 – 18 July 2001) was a first-class cricketer.

Mendl was born in the Buenos Aires suburb of Hurlingham, where his father was a grain trader. He was sent to England, along with his brother Jack Mendl, where the two were educated at Repton School. Mendl made two appearances in first-class cricket in June 1951, playing for the Free Foresters against Oxford University at Oxford, followed by an appearance for the Marylebone Cricket Club against Cambridge University at Lord's. He scored 59 runs in these two matches, with a high score of 26. He later emigrated to Australia, where he worked for Courtaulds and later for Qantas as an airline sales manager in South Africa. He died at North Ryde in Sydney in July 2001.
