= Wilfred Cowes =

Argentine cricketer

Personal information
- Full name: Wilfred Aikens Cowes
- Born: 10 July 1896; Lomas de Zamora, Buenos Aires Province Argentina
- Died: 17 January 1972 (aged 75); Argentina
- Batting: Unknown

Career statistics
Competition	First-class
Matches	3
Runs scored	85
Batting average	17.00
100s/50s	–/–
Top score	47
Catches/stumpings	–/–
- Source: Cricinfo, 27 January 2022

Wilfred Aikens Cowes (10 July 1896 — 17 January 1972) was an Argentine first-class cricketer.

Cowes was born at Lomas de Zamora in July 1896. He played first-class cricket for Argentina in December 1926 and January 1927, making three appearances against the touring Marylebone Cricket Club, playing two matches at the Belgrano Athletic Club and one at the Hurlingham Club. He scored 85 runs in these three matches at an average of 17.00, and with a highest score of 47. Cowes died in Argentina in January 1972.
