= Gordon Brown (footballer, born 1979) =

Scottish footballer

Personal information
- Date of birth: 21 October 1979 (age 47)
- Place of birth: Broxburn, Scotland
- Position: Midfielder

Senior career*
Years	Team	Apps	(Gls)
1996–1998	St Johnstone	1	(0)
1998–1999	East Fife	17	(3)
Total		18	(3)
- * Club domestic league appearances and goals

Gordon Brown (born 21 October 1979) is a Scottish former professional footballer who played as a midfielder. Born in Broxburn, Brown played in the Scottish Football League for St Johnstone and East Fife, making a total of 18 appearances.
