= Gordon Brown (Zimbabwean cricketer) =

Zimbabwean cricketer

Personal information
- Full name: Gordon John Brown
- Born: 19 April 1981 (age 45); Chinhoyi, Zimbabwe
- Batting: Right-handed
- Bowling: Right-arm off-break
- Role: All-rounder

Domestic team information
- Years: Team
- 2004–2005: Manicaland

Career statistics
| Competition | FC | LA |
|---|---|---|
| Matches | 2 | 4 |
| Runs scored | 59 | 12 |
| Batting average | 19.66 | 4.00 |
| 100s/50s | 0/0 | 0/0 |
| Top score | 36 | 7 |
| Balls bowled | 29 | 174 |
| Wickets | 0 | 1 |
| Bowling average | n/a | 119.00 |
| 5 wickets in innings | 0 | 0 |
| 10 wickets in match | 0 | n/a |
| Best bowling | 0/9 | 1/42 |
| Catches/stumpings | 0/– | 1/– |
- Source: CricketArchive, 13 January 2015

Gordon John Brown (born 19 April 1981) is a former Zimbabwean cricketer who played at first-class and limited overs level for Manicaland during the 2004–05 season.

Born in Chinhoyi in what is now Mashonaland West Province, Brown represented a Zimbabwe national under-15 team at the 1996 Lombard Under-15 Challenge Cup in England, playing against Canadian, English, Indian, and West Indian representative teams. He made his senior debut for Manicaland during the 2004–05 season of the one-day Faithwear Inter-Provincial Tournament. In four matches, Brown, a right-arm off-spinner, took only a single wicket (that of Tinashe Hove, against Matabeleland), conceding 119 runs from his 29 overs.

Despite his performance at one-day level, later in the season Brown was selected in two of Manicaland's matches in the four-day Logan Cup. He was selected as an all-rounder in these matches, coming in as high as sixth in the batting order, and indeed bowling only 4.5 overs across the two games. On debut against Mashonaland, he scored 36 runs from 83 balls before being run out by Chamu Chibhabha, his highest first-class score. Brown's batting in the next match, also against Mashonaland, was less successful, and he finished with a first-class batting average of 19.66.
