= De Courcy Lyons (cricketer) =

Argentine cricketer

Personal information
- Full name: R. A. de Courcy Lyons
- Born: 1908; Argentina
- Died: 13 April 1976 (aged 67/68); Argentina
- Batting: Unknown
- Bowling: Unknown

Career statistics
Competition	First-class
Matches	4
Runs scored	7
Batting average	1.00
100s/50s	–/–
Top score	6
Balls bowled	150
Wickets	3
Bowling average	21.00
5 wickets in innings	–
10 wickets in match	–
Best bowling	1/13
Catches/stumpings	10
- Source: Cricinfo, 26 September 2021

R. A. de Courcy Lyons (1908 — 13 April 1976) was an Argentine first-class cricketer.

Lyons was born in Argentina in 1908 and was educated in England at Brighton College. Lyons made his debut in first-class cricket for Argentina against the touring Marylebone Cricket Club at in Buenos Aires at the Hurlingham Club on New Year's Eve in 1926, with Lyons playing against the MCC in two further first-class matches in the series in January 1927 at the Belgrano Athletic Club. He later made a fourth appearance in first-class cricket in March 1930 against Sir Julien Cahn's touring personal eleven at the Hurlingham Club. In four first-class matches, he scored 7 runs and took 3 wickets.
