= General Viamonte Partido =

General Viamonte Partido de General Viamonte
- Department
- location of General Viamonte Partido in Buenos Aires Province
- Coordinates: 35°00′S 61°02′W
- Country: Argentina
- Established: July 31, 1908
- Seat: Los Toldos

Government
  - Mayor: Juan Carlos Bartoletti (PJ)

Area
  - Total: 2,150 km^{2} (830 sq mi)

Population
  - Total: 17,641
  - Density: 8.21/km^{2} (21.3/sq mi)
- Demonym: viamontense
- Postal Code: B6015
- IFAM: BUE056
- Area Code: 02358

General Viamonte Partido is a partido in the north of Buenos Aires Province in Argentina.

The provincial subdivision has a population of about 17,600 inhabitants in an area of 2,150 km^{2} (830 sq mi), and its capital city is Los Toldos, which is 310 km (193 mi) from Buenos Aires.

The town of Los Toldos is home to an Indigenous Mapuche colony.

== Name ==
The partido was originally named after a settlement that had built up around a train station on the Buenos Aires Western Railway called Los Toldos. In 1910 the name of the partido was changed from Los Toldos to General Viamonte although the town has kept the name Los Toldos.

The partido is now named in honour of General Juan José Viamonte, a hero of the Argentine War of Independence, governor of Buenos Aires and Argentine head of state for 3 days (April 18, 1815 to April 20, 1815).

There is some debate about the name of the district capital: some sources claim that the capital is also known as General Viamonte, but the population of the district still call it Los Toldos.

== Settlements ==
- Los Toldos
- Baigorrita
- Chancay
- La Delfina
- Quirno Costa
- San Emilio
- Zavalía
