= Gordon Brown (footballer, born 1965) =

Scottish footballer

Personal information
- Full name: Gordon Alexander Brown
- Date of birth: 7 December 1965 (age 60)
- Place of birth: East Kilbride, Scotland
- Position: Central defender

Senior career*
Years	Team	Apps	(Gls)
1983–1984	Rotherham United	1	(0)
- * Club domestic league appearances and goals

Gordon Alexander Brown (born 7 December 1965) is a Scottish former professional footballer who played as a central defender. Born in East Kilbride, Brown made one appearance in the English Football League for Rotherham United in the 1983–84 season.
