= Thomas Wesley-Smith =

Anglo-Argentine cricketer

Personal information
- Full name: Thomas Wesley-Smith
- Born: 6 April 1896; Argentina
- Died: 21 July 1984 (aged 88); Córdoba, Córdoba Province, Argentina
- Batting: Unknown

Career statistics
Competition	First-class
Matches	1
Runs scored	14
Batting average	7.00
100s/50s	–/–
Top score	13
Catches/stumpings	1/–
- Source: Cricinfo, 29 January 2022

Thomas Wesley-Smith (6 April 1896 — 21 July 1984) was an Anglo-Argentine first-class cricketer.

The son of Henry Smith, he was born in Argentina in April 1896 and was educated in England at Charterhouse School. He returned to Argentina after completing his education and later made a single appearance in first-class cricket for Argentina against the Marylebone Cricket Club at Buenos Aires in January 1927. Batting twice in the match, he was dismissed in the Argentine first innings for a single run by Tom Jameson, while in their second innings he was dismissed for 13 runs by the same bowler. In club cricket, he was a member of the Hurlingham Club. Wesley-Smith died at Córdoba in July 1984.
