= Frederick Keen (cricketer) =

Argentine cricketer (1898–1990)

Personal information
- Full name: Frederick Francis Keen
- Born: 14 July 1898; Laprida, Buenos Aires, Argentina
- Died: 3 April 1990 (aged 91); Buenos Aires, Argentina
- Batting: Left-handed
- Bowling: Left-arm fast-medium
- Relatives: Launcelot Ward (father-in-law)

Career statistics
Competition	First-class
Matches	7
Runs scored	115
Batting average	14.37
100s/50s	–/–
Top score	23
Balls bowled	1,026
Wickets	13
Bowling average	38.84
5 wickets in innings	–
10 wickets in match	–
Best bowling	3/31
Catches/stumpings	2/–
- Source: Cricinfo, 19 June 2019

Frederick Francis Keen (14 July 1898 – 3 April 1990) was an Argentine first-class cricketer.

Keen was born at Laprida in July 1898. He made his debut in first-class cricket for Argentina against the touring Marylebone Cricket Club at Buenos Aires in December 1926, with Keen playing a second first-class match against the same opposition the following month. He was a member of the South American cricket team which toured England in 1932, making four first-class appearances on the tour. Across seven first-class matches, Keen scored 115 runs with a high score of 23, With his left-arm fast-medium bowling, he took 13 wickets at an average of 38.84, with best figures of 3 for 31. He later stood as an umpire in a first-class match between Argentina and Sir T. E. W. Brinckman's XI in 1938. He died at Buenos Aires in April 1990. His father-in-law was the English cricketer Launcelot Ward.
