= Jack Mendl =

Argentine cricketer and educator

Personal information
- Full name: Jack Francis Mendl
- Born: 6 December 1911; Hurlingham, Buenos Aires, Argentina
- Died: 27 October 2001 (aged 89); Edinburgh, Midlothian, Scotland
- Batting: Right-handed
- Relatives: Derek Mendl (brother)

Domestic team information
- Years: Team
- 1939–1955: Oxfordshire
- 1949: Minor Counties
- 1953–1955: Scotland
- 1957: Marylebone Cricket Club

Career statistics
| Competition | First-class |
|---|---|
| Matches | 7 |
| Runs scored | 269 |
| Batting average | 24.45 |
| 100s/50s | –/2 |
| Top score | 65 |
| Catches/stumpings | –/– |
- Source: Cricinfo, 14 June 2019

Jack Francis Mendl (6 December 1911 – 27 October 2001) was a first-class cricketer and educator.

Mendl was born in the Buenos Aires suburb of Hurlingham, where his father was a grain trader. He was sent to England, along with his brother Derek Mendl, where the two were educated at Repton School. From Repton he went up to University College, Oxford to study English and history. He was denied the opportunity to play first-class cricket for Oxford University due to a skiing accident. He debuted in minor counties cricket for Oxfordshire in the 1939 Minor Counties Championship. He served with the South Wales Borderers in the Second World War, enlisting as a second lieutenant.

He began teaching at the Dragon School in Oxford in 1945, and for the next decade he opened the batting for Oxfordshire during the summer holidays. He made 76 appearances for the county in Minor Counties Championship, scoring 5,541 runs at an average of 50.83, with the Oxfordshire player Joe Banton considering him the greatest batsman to have represented the county. He made his debut in first-class cricket when he was selected to play for the Minor Counties cricket team against Yorkshire at Lord's in 1949. He accepted a teaching post in Scotland at the Edinburgh Academy in 1950. He made four first-class appearances for Scotland between 1953 and 1955, as well as appearing a first-class match for the Marylebone Cricket Club against Scotland at Aberdeen in 1957. His most notable innings for Scotland came against Derbyshire, when he scored 65 of Scotland's 100 runs total.

He taught at the Edinburgh Academy until his retirement in 1977, serving as a housemaster of Dundas House from 1962 to 1965 and Mackenzie House from 1965 to 1972. Following his retirement, Mendl remained in the Trinity area of Edinburgh and became a keen golfer. Mendl died at Edinburgh in October 2001. He was survived by his wife Betty, whom he had met shortly after arriving at the Edinburgh Academy and married in 1952, and their two children. He was also Chairman of the Cricket Society of Scotland prior to Fraser Simm.
