= Gordon J. Brown =

American politician

Member of the Washington House of Representatives for the 29th district
- In office 1951–1961

Personal details
- Born: 1904 Mankato, Minnesota, United States
- Died: April 16, 1961 (aged 56) Tacoma, Washington
- Party: Democratic

Gordon Joseph Brown (1904 – April 16, 1961) was an American politician in the state of Washington. He served in the Washington House of Representatives from 1951 to 1961 for District 6.
