= Keith Gardom =

English cricketer

Personal information
- Full name: Barrie Keith Gardom
- Born: 31 December 1952 (age 73); Birmingham, Warwickshire, England
- Batting: Right-handed
- Bowling: Leg break googly
- Role: Occasional wicket-keeper

Domestic team information
- Years: Team
- 1973–1974: Warwickshire

Career statistics
Competition	First-class	List A
Matches	17	5
Runs scored	427	2
Batting average	18.56	0.66
100s/50s	–/2	–/–
Top score	79*	2
Balls bowled	1,176	6
Wickets	17	–
Bowling average	41.17	–
5 wickets in innings	1	–
10 wickets in match	–	–
Best bowling	6/139	–
Catches/stumpings	6/–	–/–
- Source: Cricinfo, 28 September 2011

Barrie Keith Gardom (born 31 December 1952) is a former English cricketer. Gardom was a right-handed batsman who bowled leg breaks and googlies. He was born in Birmingham, Warwickshire.

Educated at Bishop Vesey's Grammar School in Sutton Coldfield, Gardom toured the West Indies with the England Young Cricketers in August–September 1972. He was awarded the Cricket Society prize for the most promising young cricketer of the year in 1972.

He made his first-class debut for Warwickshire against Cambridge University in 1973. He made sixteen further first-class appearances for the county, the last of which came against Essex in the 1974 County Championship. In his seventeen first-class matches, he scored a total of 427 runs at an average of 18.56, with a high score of 79 not out. This score, which was one of two first-class fifties he made, came against Surrey in 1974. With the ball, he took 17 wickets at a bowling average of 41.17, with best figures of 6/139. These figures, which were his only five wicket haul, came against Essex in 1974. His List A debut came in the 1973 John Player League against Somerset, with Gardom making four further List A appearances, though without success.
