= Arthur Grass =

English-born Brazilian cricketer

Personal information
- Full name: Arthur Conrad Grass
- Born: 11 October 1897; Denmark Hill, London, England
- Died: October 1994 (aged 96–97); Brighton, East Sussex, England
- Batting: Right-handed
- Bowling: Right-arm medium

International information
- National side: Brazil

Domestic team information
- Years: Team
- 1932: South Americans

Career statistics
Competition	First-class
Matches	3
Runs scored	60
Batting average	30.00
100s/50s	–/–
Top score	24*
Balls bowled	–
Wickets	–
Bowling average	–
5 wickets in innings	–
10 wickets in match	–
Best bowling	–
Catches/stumpings	–/–
- Source: CricketArchive, 13 October 2011

Arthur Conrad Grass (11 October 1897 – October 1994) played cricket for Brazil in international matches in the 1920s and toured England with the 1932 South American team, when he appeared in three first-class matches.

Grass was a right-handed batsman who played four times in international matches between Brazil and Argentina in the late 1920s, mainly batting in the lower order. His highest score in these matches was 60, batting at No 9, in the third of three games in Buenos Aires in January 1930.

On the South Americans tour of England in 1932, he played in only three of the first-class games, batting mainly at No 10 and being not out four times in six innings. His highest score was 24 not out against Sir Julien Cahn's XI. On the England tour as a whole, he only had 12 innings and did not bowl.
