= Richard West (cricketer, born 1916) =

English cricketer

Personal information
- Full name: Richard West
- Born: 8 April 1916; Berkhamsted, Hertfordshire, England
- Died: 18 June 1983 (aged 67); Dry Sandford, Berkshire, England
- Batting: Right-handed
- Bowling: Right-arm fast-medium

Domestic team information
- Years: Team
- 1936–1937: Oxford University

Career statistics
Competition	First-class
Matches	8
Runs scored	43
Batting average	4.30
100s/50s	–/–
Top score	18
Balls bowled	1,480
Wickets	28
Bowling average	24.60
5 wickets in innings	1
10 wickets in match	–
Best bowling	5/74
Catches/stumpings	5/–
- Source: Cricinfo, 7 June 2020

Richard West (8 April 1916 – 18 June 1983) was an English first-class cricketer.

West was born in April 1916 at Berkhamsted, Hertfordshire. He was educated at Rugby School, before going up to Brasenose College, Oxford. While studying at Oxford, he played first-class cricket for Oxford University in 1936 and 1937, making eight appearances. Playing as a right-arm fast-medium bowler, he took 28 wickets at an average of 24.60. He took one five wicket haul, with figures of 5 for 74 against the British Army cricket team in 1937. A tailend batsman, he scored 43 runs with a high score of 18. In addition to playing first-class cricket for Oxford, West trialled for Surrey in 1935, but was unable to secure a place in their first team. He died in June 1983 at Dry Sandford, Berkshire.
