= Gardam =

Gardam is a surname. Notable people with the surname include:

- Jane Gardam (1928–2025), English writer
- Tim Gardam (born 1956), British journalist, media executive and educator, son of Jane
