= South American cricket team in England in 1932 =

International cricket tour

A cricket team from South America toured England, Scotland and Wales in the 1932 season. The team played six first-class matches and 12 other games. A seventh first-class match with Worcestershire was abandoned without a ball being bowled.

This tour was the only occasion on which the South Americans played first-class cricket as a team representing the whole continent, though individual members of the side played for their countries in matches against touring teams from England that were designated as first-class.

== Touring team ==
The team was captained by Clement Gibson, who had played first-class cricket in England for Cambridge University, MCC and Sussex.

The full team was:

- (Argentina) Clement Gibson (c)
- (Argentina) Cyril Ayling
- (Argentina) Dennet Ayling
- (Argentina) George Ferguson
- (Brazil) Arthur Grass
- (Chile) Alfred Jackson
- (Argentina) Arnold Jacobs
- (Argentina) Frederick Keen
- (Argentina) John Knox
- (Brazil) Richard Latham
- (Argentina) Henry Marshal
- (Argentina) James Paul
- (Brazil) Ronald Pryor
- (Argentina) Robert Stuart
- (Chile) Charles Sutton

== First-class matches ==
The team played six first-class matches, and a seventh against Worcestershire was abandoned without any play.

They beat an under-strength Oxford University by 10 wickets after Marshal scored 153, Ferguson 85, and Dennet Ayling took 10 wickets in the match for 87 runs.

Leicestershire then won the second first-class game rather easily by an innings and 33 runs, with the South American batting unreliable in both innings in a match affected by heavy showers. The Army also beat the touring side after a South American first innings of 303, in which Stuart scored 133, was followed by a second innings batting collapse.

The match against Sir Julien Cahn's XI produced a remarkable victory for the South Americans. Cahn's XI made 413 in the first innings, largely due to 251 for Denys Morkel, the South African Test player, made in four hours. The South Americans responded with a century opening stand between Jackson and Dennet Ayling and totalled 338. The Ayling brothers then each took five wickets as Cahn's XI were all out for 150 and Dennet Ayling, with an unbeaten 86, took the touring side to victory by five wickets, sharing another century opening stand with Jackson.

The match with Sussex was affected by rain and left drawn. Knox made an unbeaten 110, batting at No 9 in the South American innings. The final match of the tour was a heavy defeat to Scotland by eight wickets.

== Other matches ==
The South Americans played 12 other matches, all of them one- and two-day games, and many of them affected by the weather in a wet summer. All the games were drawn, except the matches against Kent's Second Eleven and a team calling itself the Gentlemen of Somerset, both of which the touring team lost.

The match against MCC at Lord's was a two-day game. MCC were captained by the 58-year-old Pelham Warner and included the South African Test player Herbie Taylor and England players J.W.Hearne and Eddie Dawson. The South Americans had slightly the worse of a high-scoring draw.
