= Cecil Ayling =

Argentinian cricketer

Personal information
- Full name: Cecil Douglas Ayling
- Born: 1912; Argentina
- Died: 1990 (aged 77/78); Argentina
- Batting: Unknown
- Bowling: Unknown
- Relatives: Cyril Ayling (brother); Dennet Ayling (brother)

Career statistics
Competition	First-class
Matches	3
Runs scored	228
Batting average	38.00
100s/50s	–/2
Top score	75
Balls bowled	186
Wickets	2
Bowling average	69.50
5 wickets in innings	–
10 wickets in match	–
Best bowling	2/62
Catches/stumpings	3/–
- Source: Cricinfo, 26 September 2021

Cecil Douglas Ayling (1912–1990) was an Argentine first-class cricketer.

He was from a large cricket playing Anglo-Argentine family, which included his brother Cyril and Dennet. In December 1937 and January 1938, Ayling made three appearances in first-class cricket for Argentina against Sir Theodore Brinckman's personal eleven which was touring South America. The three-match series was drawn 1–1, with Ayling scoring 228 runs and recording two half centuries, with a highest score of 75. Ayling died in Argentina in 1990.
