= Arnold Jacobs (cricketer) =

Argentine cricketer (1892–1974)

Personal information
- Full name: Arnold Leslie Jacobs
- Born: 12 November 1892; Buenos Aires, Argentina
- Died: 9 August 1974 (aged 81); Buenos Aires, Argentina
- Batting: Right-handed
- Role: Wicket-keeper

International information
- National side: Argentina

Career statistics
Competition	First-class
Matches	2
Runs scored	19
Batting average	6.33
100s/50s	–/–
Top score	10
Balls bowled	–
Wickets	–
Bowling average	–
5 wickets in innings	–
10 wickets in match	–
Best bowling	–
Catches/stumpings	3/–
- Source: CricketArchive, 23 January 2011

Arnold Leslie Jacobs, born on 12 November 1892 at Buenos Aires, Argentina and died on 9 August 1974, also at Buenos Aires, played international cricket for Argentina in non-first-class matches against Brazil and Chile in the 1920s and toured England with the 1932 South American team, when he appeared in two first-class games.

Jacobs was a lower order right-handed batsman and wicketkeeper. He first appeared in international matches against Chile in 1920 and 1921, when he did not keep wickets, and played in matches against Brazil up to 1927–28. He appeared in only two matches on the 1932 South American tour, when he made just 19 runs in three innings and took three catches. Including the minor games on the tour, he made only 71 runs in England and his highest score on the tour was 12.
