= Clement Gibson =

British-Argentinian cricketer

Personal information
- Full name: Clement Herbert Gibson
- Born: 23 August 1900; Entre Ríos Province, Argentina
- Died: 31 December 1976 (aged 76); Buenos Aires, Argentina
- Batting: Right-handed
- Bowling: Right-arm fast-medium

International information
- National side: Argentina

Domestic team information
- Years: Team
- 1919–1926: Sussex
- 1920–1921: Cambridge University
- 1922/23–1939: MCC

Career statistics
| Competition | First-class |
|---|---|
| Matches | 84 |
| Runs scored | 1,369 |
| Batting average | 15.04 |
| 100s/50s | 0/3 |
| Top score | 64 |
| Balls bowled | 17,652 |
| Wickets | 249 |
| Bowling average | 28.54 |
| 5 wickets in innings | 0 |
| 10 wickets in match | 0 |
| Best bowling | 8/57 |
| Catches/stumpings | 53/– |
- Source: CricketArchive, 23 January 2011

Clement Herbert Gibson (23 August 1900 – 31 December 1976) twice won fleeting fame as a cricketer.

Gibson was born in Argentina, the second son of Sir Herbert Gibson, 1st Baronet, of Linconia and Faccombe. In 1918, in the absence of first-class cricketers to choose from because cricket was suspended during the First World War, Wisden picked Gibson, a fast-medium swing bowler from Eton College, as one of its Cricketers of the Year, along with four other "public school bowlers". He was captain of cricket at Eton in both 1918 and 1919.

After Eton, Gibson went up to Clare College, Cambridge. In 1921, having had two successful seasons playing for Cambridge University, he was picked by the former England captain Archie MacLaren as a member of his amateur eleven that took on, and beat, the all-conquering Australia national cricket team, led by Warwick Armstrong, that had won eight successive Test matches against England. Gibson took six Australian wickets for 64 runs in the second innings.

After Cambridge, he toured Australia and New Zealand on an unofficial Marylebone Cricket Club tour led by MacLaren. Also at MacLaren's instigation, he was invited to join the 1924–25 official England tour of Australia and New Zealand, but declined the invitation as he had moved back to Argentina, where he spent most of the rest of his life. Having first played for the county in two matches after leaving school in 1919, he played occasional games for Sussex until 1926 and his last first-class appearance was for the M.C.C. in 1939.

In 1932, he captained the South American touring team which played six first-class matches in England. He also represented Argentina in matches against touring sides.

He died, aged 76, in Buenos Aires.
