= Gerald Drysdale =

Anglo-Argentine cricketer

Personal information
- Full name: Gerald Carr Drysdale
- Born: 2 March 1887; Buenos Aires, Argentina
- Died: 19 February 1969 (aged 81); Argentina
- Batting: Unknown
- Bowling: Unknown

Career statistics
Competition	First-class
Matches	2
Runs scored	66
Batting average	16.50
100s/50s	–/–
Top score	36
Balls bowled	18
Wickets	0
Bowling average	–
5 wickets in innings	–
10 wickets in match	–
Best bowling	–
Catches/stumpings	–/–
- Source: Cricinfo, 27 January 2022

Gerald Carr Drysdale (2 March 1887 — 19 February 1969) was an Anglo-Argentine first-class cricketer.

Drysdale was born at Buenos Aires in March 1887. He was educated in England at Wellington College, before matriculating to University College, Oxford. Returning to Argentina after his graduation from Oxford, Drysdale played first-class cricket for Argentina against the touring Marylebone Cricket Club (MCC) in February 1912, playing two matches. Playing as a middle order batsman, he scored 66 runs in his two matches, with a highest score of 36. Drysdale died in Argentina in February 1969.
