= George Stocks =

Anglo-Argentine cricketer

Personal information
- Full name: George Wilfred Stocks
- Born: August 1913; Argentina
- Died: August 1993 (aged 79/80); Argentina
- Batting: Unknown
- Bowling: Unknown

Career statistics
Competition	First-class
Matches	2
Runs scored	17
Batting average	8.50
100s/50s	–/–
Top score	9*
Balls bowled	180
Wickets	4
Bowling average	24.00
5 wickets in innings	–
10 wickets in match	–
Best bowling	3/51
Catches/stumpings	1/–
- Source: Cricinfo, 28 January 2022

George Wilfred Stocks (August 1913 — August 1993) was an Anglo-Argentine first-class cricketer.

Stocks was born in Argentina in August 1913. He was educated in England at Denstone College, before returning to Argentina following the completion of his education. Stocks played first-class cricket for Argentina in December 1937 and January 1938, making two appearances against Sir T. E. W. Brinckman's XI. Playing as a bowler in the Argentine side, he took 4 wickets in his two matches, with best figures of 3 for 51. As a tailend batsman, he scored 17 runs with a highest score of 9 not out. Stocks died in Argentina in August 1993.
