= Cyril Ayling =

Argentine cricketer (1910–1993)

Personal information
- Full name: Cyril Edgar Ayling
- Born: 26 October 1910; Buenos Aires, Argentina
- Died: 13 November 1993 (aged 83); Argentina
- Batting: Right-handed
- Bowling: Right-arm fast-medium
- Relatives: Dennet Ayling (brother); Cecil Ayling (brother)

International information
- National side: Argentina

Career statistics
Competition	First-class
Matches	9
Runs scored	200
Batting average	15.38
100s/50s	–/1
Top score	50
Balls bowled	1,362
Wickets	24
Bowling average	28.08
5 wickets in innings	1
10 wickets in match	–
Best bowling	5/48
Catches/stumpings	8/–
- Source: CricketArchive, 23 January 2011

Cyril Edgar Ayling (October 1910 – 13 November 1993) was a cricketer who played for Argentina and was a member of the South American cricket team that toured England in 1932. He represented Argentina in three first-class matches against Sir Theodore Brinckman's XI in 1937–38, but also played in non-first-class representational matches for Argentina from 1930 to 1959. He was born in Buenos Aires.

Ayling was a middle-to-lower order right-handed batsman and a right-arm fast medium bowler. On the tour of England in 1932, his batting was not very successful in the six first-class matches, and his highest score was only 34. His bowling was better and he took 19 wickets in first-class games, with a best of five for 48 as he and his brother, Dennet Ayling, bowled the South American team to victory over Sir Julien Cahn's side at Nottingham. Outside the first-class games, he scored an unbeaten 95 and took five for 72 against MCC at Lord's; his innings averted the follow-on and his victims included Test player Eddie Dawson and former England captain Pelham Warner.

Against Brinckman's XI in 1937–38, Ayling played alongside Dennet and a third brother, Cecil Ayling. His highest score in three matches came in a rearguard action in the last of the three games, in which all three brothers reached 50 – in Cyril's case, exactly 50. His best bowling, four for 95, also came in this match.

Cyril Ayling continued to play high-level Argentinian cricket past his 50th birthday.

He died in November 1993, a few days after his 83rd birthday.
