= Dennet Ayling =

Argentine cricketer (1906–1987)

Personal information
- Full name: Dennet Ernest Ayling
- Born: 8 June 1906; Buenos Aires, Argentina
- Died: 18 December 1987 (aged 81); Los Cocos, Córdoba Province, Argentina
- Batting: Right-handed
- Bowling: Right-arm off break
- Relatives: Cyril Ayling (brother); Cecil Ayling (brother)

International information
- National side: Argentina

Career statistics
Competition	First-class
Matches	16
Runs scored	653
Batting average	24.18
100s/50s	–/4
Top score	88
Balls bowled	3,233
Wickets	79
Bowling average	16.43
5 wickets in innings	7
10 wickets in match	2
Best bowling	6/10
Catches/stumpings	6/–
- Source: CricketArchive, 23 January 2011

Dennet Ernest Ayling (June 8, 1906 in Buenos Aires, Argentina – December 18, 1987 in Los Cocos, Cordoba, Argentina), played first-class cricket for the Argentina cricket team in international matches and toured England as a member of the 1932 South American team, which played several first-class cricket matches.

As a right-handed middle order batsman and a right-arm offbreak bowler, Ayling's figures in the limited number of first-class matches that he played suggest that he was potentially one of the best cricketers produced by Argentina. On the South American tour of England in 1932, he scored 342 runs in the six first-class matches at an average of 42 and took 33 wickets at just over 16 runs each. His best batting performance was an unbeaten 86 in the match against Sir Julien Cahn's XI and in the match against Oxford University he took 10 wickets for 87 in the two Oxford innings.

In Argentina, he played domestic cricket to a high standard for 20 years, from 1926/27 to 1937/38. His brothers Cyril, Cecil and Eric also played for Argentina.
