= William Gardom =

Anglo-Argentine cricketer

Personal information
- Full name: William Douglas Crowhelm Gardom
- Born: 18 June 1884; Argentina
- Died: 24 May 1944 (aged 59); Bideford, Devon, England
- Batting: Unknown

Career statistics
Competition	First-class
Matches	1
Runs scored	10
Batting average	5.00
100s/50s	–/–
Top score	9
Catches/stumpings	–/–
- Source: Cricinfo, 27 January 2022

William Douglas Crowhelm Gardom (18 June 1884 — 24 May 1944) was an Anglo-Argentine first-class cricketer.

Gardom was born in Argentina in June 1884. A club cricketer for the Hurlingham Club, he made a single appearance in first-class cricket for Argentina against the touring Marylebone Cricket Club at Buenos Aires in March 1912. Batting twice in the match, he was dismissed for a single run in the Argentine first innings by Henry Baird, and for 9 runs by Eric Hatfeild in their second innings. Gardom later emigrated to England, where he died at Bideford in May 1944.
