= Henry Marshal (cricketer) =

Argentine cricketer (1900–1970)

Personal information
- Full name: Henry Worgan Marshal
- Born: 27 June 1900; Santa María, Huila Department, Colombia
- Died: 6 January 1970 (aged 69); Ullesthorpe, Leicestershire, England
- Batting: Right-handed
- Role: Wicket-keeper

International information
- National side: Argentina

Career statistics
Competition	First-class
Matches	10
Runs scored	487
Batting average	28.64
100s/50s	–/2
Top score	153
Balls bowled	–
Wickets	–
Bowling average	–
5 wickets in innings	–
10 wickets in match	–
Best bowling	–
Catches/stumpings	11/–
- Source: CricketArchive, 23 January 2011

Henry Worgan Marshal (27 June 1900 at Santa Maria, Colombia – 6 January 1970 at Ullesthorpe, Leicestershire, England) played cricket in first-class matches for Argentina against touring sides from England, and for the South American team that toured England in 1932. He also represented Argentina in non-first-class international matches against Chile.

Educated at Oundle School, Marshal was a right-handed opening batsman, and also acted as wicketkeeper in several of his first-class matches. He made his first-class debut in four matches against an MCC side in 1926–27, scoring 105 on his debut. He also played for Argentina in 1929–30 against a touring side under Sir Julien Cahn.

His biggest innings came for the South American side in England. In the first first-class match, against Oxford University, Marshal made 153 in four-and-a-half hours. Wisden Cricketers' Almanack reported that he "scarcely lifted the ball at all and did not give a chance". The innings was highest of the tour by any batsman in any match, first-class or non-first-class. On the tour as a whole, Marshal scored 255 first-class runs at an average of 31.87 runs per innings; including other matches, his aggregate was 652 runs at 34.31, and he made a second century, 101 not out, in a non-first-class match against the South American Banks at Teddington.

Marshal played in domestic Argentine cricket into his 40s.
