= Pablo Ferguson =

Argentine cricketer (born 1981)

Personal information
- Born: 5 September 1981 (age 45); Buenos Aires, Argentina
- Batting: Right-handed
- Bowling: Right-arm Offbreak

International information
- National side: Argentina
- Source: Cricinfo, 14 July 2015

Pablo Ferguson (born 5 September 1981) is an Argentine cricketer. He played in the 2013 ICC World Cricket League Division Six tournament.
