= Evelyn Toulmin =

Anglo-Argentine cricketer

Personal information
- Full name: Evelyn Murrough O'Brien Toulmin
- Born: 13 August 1877; Hatfield Peverel, Essex, England
- Died: 7 January 1945 (aged 67); Paris, France
- Batting: Left-handed
- Bowling: Right-arm slow

Domestic team information
- Years: Team
- 1912: Essex
- 1911/12: Argentina
- 1899: Essex

Career statistics
Competition	First-class
Matches	5
Runs scored	134
Batting average	16.75
100s/50s	–/1
Top score	59
Balls bowled	484
Wickets	17
Bowling average	14.70
5 wickets in innings	1
10 wickets in match	1
Best bowling	6/60
Catches/stumpings	4/–
- Source: Cricinfo, 25 February 2012

Evelyn Murrough O'Brien Toulmin (13 August 1877 – 7 January 1945) was an Ango-Irish banker who also played cricket for Argentina. Toulmin was a left-handed batsman who bowled right-arm slow; after his playing career, he was director of Lloyd's & National Provincial Foreign Bank Ltd in Paris, France. The son of English priest Reverend Frederick Bransby Toulmin and Irish aristocrat Katherine O'Brien (sister of the 13th Baron Inchiquin), he was born at Hatfield Peverel, Essex, and educated at the King's School, Oxford.

Toulmin made his first-class debut for Essex against Sussex at the County Ground, Hove, in the 1899 County Championship. He later moved to Argentina, with him next appearing in first-class cricket for Argentina in February 1912, making three appearances against the touring Marylebone Cricket Club. Toulin took 15 wickets in his three matches, which came at an average of 12.86. His best innings figures of 6/60 came in the second match at the Buenos Aires Cricket Club Ground, during which he also claimed another four wickets, giving him both his only five wicket haul in an innings and his only ten wicket haul in a match. He also scored 133 runs during the series, which came at a batting average of 22.16, with a high score of 59. He returned to England later in 1912, playing a single first-class match for Essex against Yorkshire at the Fartown Ground, Huddersfield.

After retiring in Paris from a subsequent career in banking, Toulmin was interned at Besançon in December 1940, initially sharing a Vauban fort barrack room (Batîment C no.31) with eight other civilian prisoners, including Canadian journalist and wartime diarist Paul de Martigny.

Toulmin had served as President, Vice-President, and member of the Board of Trustees of the American Library in Paris, where colleagues included Edith Wharton.

Toulmin was the third husband of Cornelia "Constance" Toulmin, née Baxter, known formally at the time of her marriage as Mrs William Leveson-Gower. They had a daughter Cynthia (1919-2000) who drove a Hadfield-Spears ambulance for the Free French Forces at the Battle of Bir-Hakeim in 1942, later becoming a Countess de Lasta; her first husband had been killed in 1946 by Jewish terrorists whilst serving as a Commissioner in Jerusalem. Evelyn died in Paris, France, on 7 January 1945.
