= Neville Jackson (cricketer) =

Anglo-Argentine cricketer

Personal information
- Full name: Neville Ward Jackson
- Born: 25 April 1875; British India
- Died: 23 March 1919 (aged 43); Viamonte, Buenos Aires Province, Argentina
- Batting: Unknown

Career statistics
Competition	First-class
Matches	3
Runs scored	152
Batting average	25.33
100s/50s	–/–
Top score	49
Catches/stumpings	6/–
- Source: Cricinfo, 26 January 2022

Neville Ward Jackson (25 April 1875 — 23 March 1919) was an Anglo-Argentine first-class cricketer.

Jackson was born in British India to Colonel F. H. Jackson of the British Indian Army. He was educated in England at Haileybury. He later moved to Argentina, where he played first-class cricket for Argentina on three occasions in February 1912 against the touring Marylebone Cricket Club. He scored 152 runs in these matches, at an average of 25.33 and with a highest score of 49. Jackson died at Viamonte in Buenos Aires in March 1919.
