= Sir Theodore Brinckman, 4th Baronet =

English cricketer

Theodore Brinckman
Personal information
- Full name: Theodore Ernest Warren Brinckman
- Born: 21 May 1898; Westminster, London, England
- Died: 26 July 1954 (aged 56); Marylebone, London, England

Career statistics
| Competition | First-class |
|---|---|
| Matches | 3 |
| Runs scored | 42 |
| Batting average | 10.50 |
| 100s/50s | 0/0 |
| Top score | 19 |
| Catches/stumpings | 1/– |
- Source: Cricinfo, 26 December 2023

Major Sir Theodore Ernest Warren Brinckman, 4th Baronet (21 May 1898 – 26 July 1954) was an English first-class cricketer.

Brinckman was educated at Eton College and served as an officer in the 1st Life Guards during World War I.

Brinckman played often for the Marylebone Cricket Club (MCC), and captained teams that toured the Channel Islands and South America. In 1937–38 he took a team to South America called "Sir T. E. W. Brinckman's XI", that played three first-class matches against Argentina, drawing the three match series 1–1. These three matches were the extent of his first-class career.

In 1937, Brinckman succeeded his father as baronet. Although he was married three times, he died without issue and the baronetcy passed to his younger brother Roderick.

Baronetage of the United Kingdom
| Preceded by Theodore Francis Brinckman | Baronet (of Monk Bretton); 1937–1954 | Succeeded by Roderick Napoleon Brinckman |
