= Julien Cahn =

British businessman, philanthropist and cricket enthusiast (1882–1944)

Sir Julien Cahn Bt.
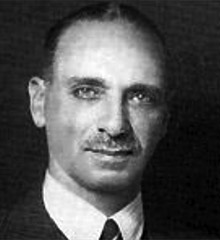
- Born: 21 October 1882; Cardiff, Glamorgan, Wales
- Died: 26 September 1944 (aged 61); Nottinghamshire, England
- Cricket career

Cricket information
- Batting: Right-handed
- Bowling: Right-arm slow

Domestic team information
- Years: Team
- 1929–1935: Sir Julien Cahn's XI
- FC debut: 21 February 1929 Sir J Cahn's XI v Jamaica
- Last FC: 3 September 1935 Sir J Cahn's XI v Lancashire

Career statistics
Competition	First-class
Matches	6
Runs scored	70
Batting average	10.00
100s/50s	0/0
Top score	17
Balls bowled	145
Wickets	2
Bowling average	74.50
5 wickets in innings	0
10 wickets in match	0
Best bowling	1/1
Catches/stumpings	0/–
- Source: CricketArchive, 6 July 2008

Sir Julien Cahn, 1st Baronet (21 October 1882 – 26 September 1944) was a British businessman, philanthropist and cricket enthusiast.

== Early life and family ==
Cahn was born in Cardiff in 1882 to parents of German Jewish descent. His father, Albert Cahn (1856–1921), was born in the small village of Russheim in the Germersheim district, Rhein-Pfalz-Kreis. Albert married Matilda Lewis (d. 1921), daughter of Dr Sigismund Lewis of Liverpool, who had also emigrated from Germany. Dr Lewis delivered his grandson after a difficult birth; Matilda recovered well but Julien would be an only child.

Julien grew up in a strict Orthodox household in Nottingham, where his father opened the Nottingham Furnishing Company in 1885. Albert was very active in the Nottingham Jewish community, becoming the president of the Chaucer Street synagogue and Hebrew Philanthropic Society.

Julien attended primary school with Harold Bowden, later the 2nd Baronet, and the two became lifelong friends.

Cahn married Phyllis Muriel Wolfe on 11 July 1916. They had three children, Patience Cahn (born 1922), Albert Jonas (1924) and Richard Ian (1927). Albert Jonas assumed the baronetcy on his father's death.

== Business ==
Cahn took over the family business and, seeing a new potential market in hire purchase sales, expanded the company to the extent that his Jays and Campbells stores were to be found in most major towns across Britain. By 1943 when he retired and sold out to Great Universal Stores (GUS), he controlled a chain of more than 300 stores.

== Philanthropy ==
After his business success, Cahn established himself as a philanthropist. Having been knighted in 1929, Cahn was made a baronet in 1934. The honour was made ostensibly for his charity and services to agriculture. However, it was actually bestowed for secretly providing £30,000 to the Conservative Government to ensure honours salesman Maundy Gregory stayed out of Britain.

One of his best-known gifts was his rescue of the Newstead Abbey, the 12th-century ancestral home of Lord Byron, which was at risk. Cahn purchased Newstead and donated it to the Nottingham City Council to help preserve Byron's legacy.

Cahn was the long-time president of The National Birthday Trust Fund, a charity that promoted the provision of maternity services. In this capacity he became very friendly with the trust's vice president, Lucy Baldwin, Countess Baldwin of Bewdley, wife of prime minister Stanley Baldwin. In 1929, Cahn donated funds to build the Lucy Baldwin Maternity Hospital in Stourport-on-Severn, Worcestershire, named in honour of the countess. It was commemorated by the prime minister on 16 April 1929 with a bronze dedication plaque over the main entrance reading, "What she wanted most in the world. Presented to her by Julien Cahn Esq."

During the Great Depression and Second World War, Cahn sponsored cricket clubs and players that needed funds to play. In 1935, he paid the membership subscriptions for more than 800 new members joining the Nottinghamshire County Cricket Club.

After the war began in 1939, Cahn lent his home at Stanford Hall to Nottingham City Hospital. Stanford Hall initially offered 22 beds for convalescing soldiers, but by 1940 expanded to house nearly 70.

== Sport ==
Cahn was a fan of fox hunting, and was one of the few Jewish Masters of Foxhounds.

His main love, however, was cricket. He began playing as a teenager, during a time when it was common for business owners to organise teams. At age 19, he created the Nottingham Furniture Company XI with 16 of his father's employees. In 1903, the team expanded to 35 players for its third season, and was renamed the Notts Ramblers.

One of the earliest players was W. H. Vaulkhard, who joined the team in 1904; his four sons also took up the sport and played on Cahn's teams. Pat Vaulkhard became a first-class player in his day.

He served as president of both the Nottinghamshire County Cricket Club and Leicestershire County Cricket Club. He eventually built his own pitch at Stanford Hall so he could watch games at home.

From 1929 to 1939, Cahn was the captain of his own team, the Sir Julien Cahn XI, that toured the world. It was one of the most successful private teams, losing only 19 out of 621 cricket matches. Cahn recruited top players from outside England, including Australians Vic Jackson and Jack Walsh.

Cahn played in many of his team's matches, including six of the 13 first-class matches they played between 1929 and 1939. He made his first-class debut in March 1929 at the age of 46 when his team was playing in Jamaica. Stephen Chalke has written, "No English first-class cricketer of the 20th century can have had less ability than Cahn. He was a hypochondriac, often preferring his electric wheelchair to walking ... he batted in special inflatable pads that it was his chauffeur's duty to pump up."

== See also ==
- Sir Julien Cahn's cricket team in Ceylon in 1936–37, international tour
- Sir Julien Cahn's cricket team in New Zealand in 1938–39, international tour
- Stanford Hall
- History of cricket

Baronetage of the United Kingdom
New title	Baronet (of Stanford on Soar); 1934–1944	Succeeded by Albert Jonas Cahn
