= Julian Hasler =

British Army general

Brigadier-General Julian Hasler
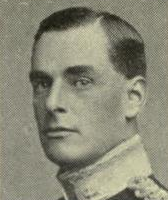
- Born: 16 October 1868; Aldingbourne House, Chichester, Sussex, England
- Died: 27 April 1915 (aged 46); Ypres, Belgium
- Relatives: William Wyndham Hasler (father)
- Military career
- Allegiance: United Kingdom
- Branch: British Army
- Service years: 1888–1915
- Rank: Brigadier-General
- Unit: Buffs (East Kent Regiment)
- Commands: 11th Infantry Brigade
- Conflicts: South African War; First World War
- Awards: Mentioned in dispatches

Brigadier-General Julian Hasler (16 October 1868 – 27 April 1915) was a British Army officer who fought in World War I as a brigade commander before being killed in action.

== Early life ==
Julian Hasler was born in Aldingbourne, West Sussex on 16 October 1868, the second son of William Wyndham Hasler, a wealthy landowner and Justice of the Peace for Sussex, and Selina Sarah Hervey, a member of the extended family of the Marquess of Bristol. After spending his early year at Aldingbourne House, his ancestral home, he attended Winchester College from 1882 to 1885.

== Military career ==
After the academy, Julian Hasler was commissioned into the 1st Battalion of the East Kent Regiment, on 19 September 1888, and soon promoted to lieutenant on 4 February 1892. From 1895 he was almost uninterruptedly in active military service, first with the Chitral Relief Force (1895), then the Northwest Frontier in India 1897-1898, where he participated in the capture of the Tanga Pass, and was promoted to captain on 12 March 1898. He was seconded for service in West Africa under the Colonial Office from June 1899, and served in South Africa during the Second Boer War (1900-1902), where he raised the Hasler's Australian Scouts, following which he received the brevet rank of major on 22 August 1902. From January 1903 he was again seconded for service under the Colonial office, and served with the Northern Nigeria Regiment. In Nigeria he documented a new species of Red-fronted gazelle. (Note: Hasler presented the discovery to the London Zoological Society in 1908 and the new taxon was called Gazella Rufifrons Hasleri.) He stayed in West Africa 1903–1910.

He was wounded several times and mentioned twice in dispatches because of his bravery. A brevet lieutenant colonel in April 1906, he was promoted to major on 7 February 1907, to temporary colonel in September, and to lieutenant colonel on 4 August 1914.

== First World War ==
After the outbreak of the war, he was promoted Brigadier-General and sent to France in September 1914. There, he was given command of the 1st Battalion of the Buffs. Wounded in October of the same year, he briefly returned home for convalescence. In December he went back to the front, where he was in command of the 11th Infantry Brigade. He distinguished himself for gallantry and resilience and was mentioned in dispatches twice by Field Marshal Sir John French.

== Death ==
The 11th Brigade was operating as part of 4th division in the area of Ploegsteert Wood, Belgium close to the French Border. On 24 April 1915 it was sent north to reinforce the 5th Corps in the Ypres salient and was subsequently attached to 28th Division, taking over the front line between BERLIN WOOD and FORTUIN. On 27 April 1915, Hasler fell in action at St. Jean, near Ypres in Belgium, in the context of the Second battle of Ypres, being the second general to die because of heavy shelling of an advanced headquarter that was placed too close to the salient. His commanding officer, Major-General Edward Bulfin, had ordered him to abandon the position after dark on that same day, but he was delayed and was killed around 9pm that evening.

"I saw poor Julian Hasler on the 27th April; the place was being heavily shelled. I sent him up Grogan and Le Preu, my GSO2 and GSO3, to help him, and some signallers, but all the lines were constantly cut so I ordered him to get out as soon as it was dark. He was killed about 9 p.m. that night: he could have got out at 6 p.m., but delayed"

— General Bulfin, commander of the 28th Division

His death features in a number of war diaries of the time. He left a wife, Edith Gwendolin Orr-Ewing, and two young children.

== Notes ==
Military offices
Preceded by Aylmer Hunter-Weston	Commander, 11th Infantry Brigade; 1915–1915	Succeeded by Charles Bertie Prowse
