= 11 Brigade (United Kingdom) =

British Army unit

11th (Lancashire) Brigade 11th Light Brigade 11th Infantry Brigade 11th Infantry Brigade & HQ South East 11th Security Force Assistance Brigade 11th Brigade
- The brigade's TRF.
- Active: 1899–1900, 1902–1919, 1938–1946; 1950–1966, 2009–2010; 2014–present
- Country: United Kingdom
- Branch: British Army
- Role: Recce-strike
- Size: Brigade
- Part of: Land Special Operations Force
- Brigade HQ: Aldershot Garrison
- Engagements: Second Boer War; First World War; Second World War; Operation Herrick

Commanders
- Current commander: Brigadier Benjamin J. Cattermole
- Notable commanders: Kenneth Anderson; Brian Horrocks

The 11th Brigade is a brigade of the British Army which is transitioning to the tactical recce-strike role. The brigade was formerly the 11th Security Force Assistance Brigade, providing training and guidance for foreign militaries.

Originally formed in the Second Boer War, the brigade was engaged during both World Wars, and deployed to Afghanistan.

== History ==
=== Second Boer War ===
British Army brigades had traditionally been ad hoc formations known by the name of their commander or numbered as part of a division. However, units involved in the Second Boer War in 1899–1900 were organised into sequentially numbered brigades that were frequently reassigned between divisions. The Army Corps sent from Britain in 1899 comprised six brigades in three divisions while the troops already in South Africa were intended to constitute a fourth division. The rapid deterioration of the situation led the War Office to announce on 11 November 1899 that a 5th Division was to be formed and sent out. This consisted of the new 10th and 11th (Lancashire) Brigades and concentrated at Estcourt on 8 January 1900 for the campaign for the Relief of Ladysmith.

==== Order of battle ====
The 11th (Lancashire) Brigade was constituted as follows:

- 2nd Battalion, King's Own (Royal Lancaster Regiment)
- 2nd Battalion, Lancashire Fusiliers
- 1st Battalion, South Lancashire Regiment
- 1st Battalion, York and Lancaster Regiment

==== Commanders ====
- Major-General Edward Woodgate (mortally wounded at Spion Kop 23/24 January 1900)
- Lieutenant-Colonel Malby Crofton (Royal Lancaster Regiment) (acting)
- Colonel Arthur Wynne (wounded at Tugela Heights 22 February 1900)
- Lieutenant-Colonel Malby Crofton (acting)
- Brigadier-General Walter Kitchener (acting)
- Maj-Gen Arthur Wynne (returned by May 1900)

As well as Spion Kop and Tugela Heights, the brigade served at Trichard's Drift, Tabanyama, Vaal Krantz, Wessel's Nek, Waschbank, Botha's Pass, Alleman's Nek, Volkrust, Wakkerstroom, and the advance on Standerton. However, after the defeat of the main Boer field armies and the development of guerrilla warfare, all the divisions and brigades were broken up to form ad hoc 'columns' and garrisons.

After the Boer War, 11th Brigade became a permanent formation in 1902, stationed at Portsmouth. By 1907 it was part of 6th Division in Eastern Command. In the Expeditionary Force established by the Haldane reforms, 11th Brigade at Colchester became part of 4th Division, and remained so until the outbreak of World War I.

=== First World War ===
When war broke out in August 1914 the 11th Infantry Brigade mobilised as part of the 4th Division. It was one of the British units sent overseas to France as part of the British Expeditionary Force and fought on the Western Front for the next four years.

==== Order of battle ====
During World War I the brigade had the following composition:

- 1st Battalion, Somerset Light Infantry
- 1st Battalion, East Lancashire Regiment (left to join 103rd Brigade, 34th Division, 1 February 1918)
- 1st Battalion, Hampshire Regiment
- 1st Battalion, Rifle Brigade
- 2nd Battalion, Royal Irish Regiment (joined from 12th Brigade 26 July 1915, left to join 22nd Brigade, 7th Division, 22 May 1916)
- 11th Brigade Machine Gun Company (formed 23 December 1915; left to join No 4 Battalion, Machine Gun Corps, 26 February 1918)
- 11th Brigade Trench Mortar Battery (formed June 1916)

==== Service ====
During the war the brigade participated in the following actions:

1914

- Retreat from Mons, 25 August–5 September
- Battle of Le Cateau, 16 August
- First Battle of the Marne, 6–9 September
- Crossing of the Aisne, 12 September
- First Battle of the Aisne, 13–20 September
- Battle of Armentières, 3 October–2 November
  - Capture of Méteren, 13 October

1915

- Second Battle of Ypres:
  - Battle of St Julien 25 April–4 May
  - Battle of Frezenberg Ridge, 8–13 May
  - Battle of Bellewaarde Ridge, 24–25 May

1916

- Battle of the Somme:
  - Battle of Albert, 1–2 July
  - Battle of the Transloy Ridges, 10–18 October

1917

- Battle of Arras:
  - First Battle of the Scarpe, 9–14 April
  - Second Battle of the Scarpe, 3–4 May
- Third Battle of Ypres:
  - Battle of Polygon Wood, 28 September–3 October
  - Battle of Broodseinde, 4 October
  - Battle of Poelcappelle, 9 October
  - First Battle of Passchendaele, 12 October

1918

- German Spring Offensive:
  - Third Battle of Arras, 28 March
- Battle of the Lys:
  - Battle of Hazebrouck, 13–15 April, including defence of Hinges Wood
  - Battle of Béthune, 18 April
- Hundred Days Offensive:
  - Battle of the Scarpe, 29–30 August
  - Battle of the Drocourt-Quéant Line, 2–3 September
  - Battle of the Canal du Nord, 27 September–1 October
  - Battle of the Selle, 17–25 October
  - Battle of Valenciennes, 1–2 November

==== Commanders ====
During World War I the brigade was commanded by the following officers:

- Brigadier-General Aylmer Hunter-Weston (February 1914)
- Brigadier-General Julian Hasler (26 February 1915 –killed 27 April 1915)
- Lieutenant-Colonel F. R. Hicks (27 April 1915 - acting)
- Brigadier-General Charles Bertie Prowse (29 April 1915 – killed 1 July 1916)
- Major W. A. T. B. Somerville (1 July 1916 - acting)
- Brigadier-General H. C. Rees (3 July 1916)
- Brigadier-General R. A. Berners (7 December 1916)
- Lieutenant-Colonel F. A. W. Armitage (15 October 1917 - acting)
- Brigadier-General T. S. H. Wade (21 October 1917)
- Brigadier-General W. J. Webb-Bowen (19 September 1918)

=== Second World War ===
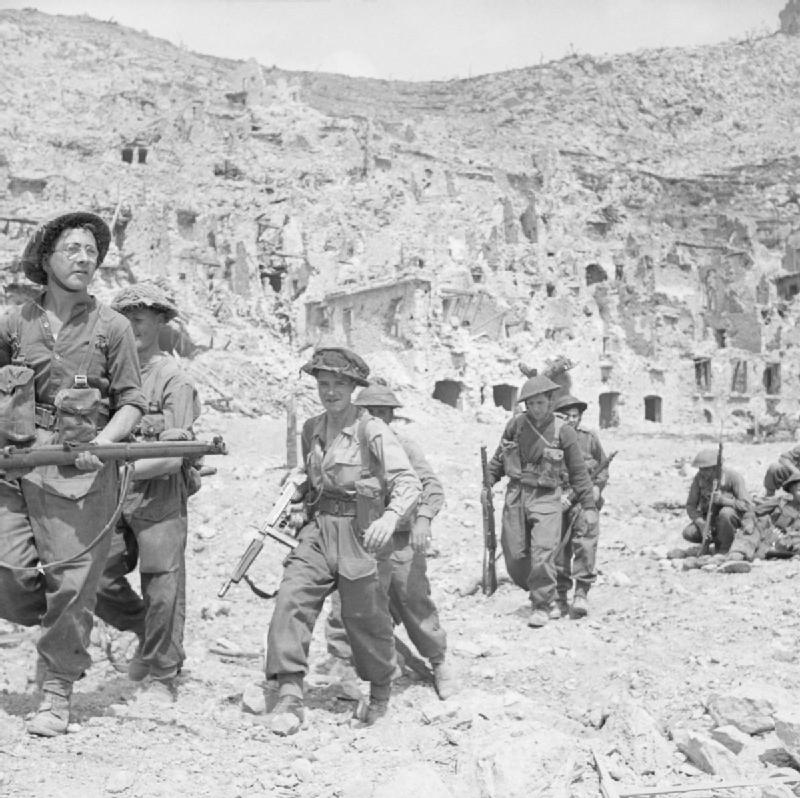
East Surrey Regiment enter the ruins of Cassino, Italy, 18 May 1944

The 11th Infantry Brigade was originally part of the 4th Infantry Division as it was during the First World War, serving with it during the Battle of France and was evacuated from Dunkirk in late May 1940. It remained with the division in the United Kingdom up until 6 June 1942 when it was reassigned to join 78th Infantry Division (commanded by Vyvyan Evelegh, a previous commander of the brigade) which was being newly formed to take part in Operation Torch, the Allied landings in French North Africa, as part of the British First Army (commanded by Kenneth Anderson, also a previous commander of the brigade). The brigade landed in North Africa at Algiers in November 1942 and fought with 78th Division throughout the Tunisian campaign which ended with the Axis surrender in May 1943. It then served with 78th Division throughout the campaigns in Sicily and Italy.

==== Order of battle ====
During World War II the brigade comprised the following units:

- Headquarters, 11th Infantry Brigade & Signal Section
- 2nd Battalion, The Lancashire Fusiliers
- 1st Battalion, East Surrey Regiment
- 1st Battalion, Oxfordshire and Buckinghamshire Light Infantry (left to join 143rd Brigade 31 December 1940)
- 11th Infantry Brigade Anti-Tank Company (left to join 4th Battalion, Reconnaissance Corps, 1 January 1941)
- 5th (Huntingdon) Battalion, Northamptonshire Regiment (joined from 143rd Brigade 29 January 1941)

==== Commanders ====
During World War II the brigade was commanded by the following officers:

- Brigadier Kenneth Anderson (1938–1940)
- Lieutenant-Colonel Brian Horrocks: (30 May 1940 – acting until 3 June)
- Brigadier John Grover (14 June 1940)
- Lieutenant-Colonel R.A. Boxshall (7 January 1941 – acting)
- Brigadier Vyvyan Evelegh (11 January 1941)
- Brigadier Guy Francis Gough (13 November 1941)
- Brigadier Edward Cass (18 February 1942)
- Brigadier Keith Arbuthnott (29 September 1943)
- Lieutenant-Colonel John Alexander Mackenzie (10 October 1944 – acting)
- Brigadier Gerald Ernest Thubron (23 November 1944 – 1945)

=== Post-war ===
In January 1946, following the end of the campaign in Europe, the brigade was dissolved and its units dispersed to other brigades and commands. In 1950, the brigade was reformed in West Germany.

The organisation of the brigade during the 1950s was as follows:

- Brigade Headquarters, at Kingsley Barracks, Minden
- 9th Queen's Royal Lancers, at Lothian Barracks, Detmold (Armoured role, with Centurion main battle tanks)
- 1st Battalion, The Sherwood Foresters (Nottinghamshire & Derbyshire Regiment), at Dempsey Barracks, Sennelager
- 1st Battalion, The Manchester Regiment, at Clifton Barracks, Minden – merged with the King's Liverpool Regiment on 1 September 1958 to form the King's Regiment
- 1st Battalion, The Dorset Regiment, at Elizabeth Barracks, Minden – from April 1956, merged with the Devonshire Regiment in 1958 to form the Devonshire and Dorset Regiment

On 1 April 1956, the 4th Infantry Division was reformed in the BAOR, and its brigades: 10th, 11th, and 12th was reformed by conversion of the old 61st Lorried Infantry Brigade based in Minden. In 1958, following the 1957 Defence White Paper, the brigade was redesignated as 11th Infantry Brigade Group. As a brigade group, it picked up not just infantry but supporting elements such as artillery. It was shifted to the 2nd Division. And in 1964, the brigade was transferred to the 1st Division, sitting alongside the 7th Armoured Brigade Group. In February 1961, the brigade groups were reorganised again, to comprise a signal squadron, armoured regiment, three infantry battalions, field artillery regiment, engineer squadron, and one AAC reconnaissance flight.

The brigade's structure following its conversion to a brigade group was as follows:

- Brigade Headquarters, at Kingsley Barracks, Minden
- 7th Royal Tank Regiment, at Haig Barracks, Hohne – merged with 4th Royal Tank Regiment on 3 April 1959
  - 4th Royal Tank Regiment – from April 1959
- 1st Battalion, North Staffordshire Regiment (Prince of Wales's), at Clifton Barracks, Minden
  - 1st Battalion, The South Wales Borderers – from June 1959
- 1st Battalion, The Highland Light Infantry (City of Glasgow Regiment), at Alma Barracks, Lüneburg
  - 1st Battalion, Middlesex Regiment (Duke of Cambridge's Own) – from November 1958
- 1st Battalion, The Royal Lincolnshire Regiment, at Elizabeth Barracks, Minden – from June 1958
- 19th Field Regiment, Royal Artillery, at Saint George's Barracks, Minden (Field artillery; 18 x Ordnance QF 25-pdr howitzers)
- 25 Field Squadron, Royal Engineers, at Saint George's Barracks, Minden

In November 1965, the brigade groups became 'brigades' once again, dropping their support units. In October 1966, just after the publication of the 1966 Defence White Paper, the 7th Armoured and 11th Infantry brigades experimented with a new brigade organisation with two armoured regiments and two 'mechanised' battalions equipped with the new FV432 armoured personnel carrier. With the increasing availability of the new vehicle, all of the infantry battalions within the BAOR were to become mechanised.

The brigade's structure just before conversion was as follows:

- Brigade Headquarters, at Kingsley Barracks, Minden
- 211 Signal Squadron (Infantry Brigade Group), Royal Corps of Signals, at Kingsley Barracks, Minden
- The Royal Scots Greys (2nd Dragoons), at Wessex Barracks, Fallingbostel
- 1st Battalion, The Royal Warwickshire Fusiliers, at Gordon Barracks, Hameln
  - 1st Battalion, The Duke of Edinburgh's Royal Regiment (Berkshire & Wiltshire) – from June 1966
  - 16th/5th The Queen's Royal Lancers – in infantry role from June 1969
- 1st Battalion, The Royal Welch Fusiliers, at Saint George's Barracks, Minden
  - 1st Battalion, The Gordon Highlanders – from April 1967
  - 15th/19th The King's Royal Hussars – in infantry role from November 1969
- 1st Battalion, The Black Watch (Royal Highland Regiment), at Elizabeth Barracks, Minden
  - 1st Battalion, The Sherwood Foresters (Nottinghamshire & Derbyshire Regiment) – from March 1968

As a result of the above defence white paper and experimentations, the BAOR was completely reorganised with the 11th Infantry Brigade becoming an armoured formation in the end of 1970. The new formation, 11th Armoured Brigade, was reformed, thus ending the infantry lineage.

=== Twenty-first century ===
==== Afghanistan ====
On 15 October 2007, Helmand Task Force 11 formed its planning cell at Aldershot Garrison, expanding into 11th Light Brigade in November 2007 for deployment to Afghanistan (Operation Herrick). The brigade was stood up alongside 52nd Infantry Brigade thus providing the Army with two infantry brigades available for deployment to either Afghanistan (Operation Herrick) or Iraq (Operation Telic).

On 10 October 2009, the brigade deployed to Helmand Province, replacing 19th Light Brigade and would remain until April 2010. The brigade's order of battle on deployment to Afghanistan was as follows alongside the formation they had been part of:

- Brigade Headquarters
- 11th Light Brigade Headquarters & 261 Signal Squadron, Royal Corps of Signals (101st Logistic Brigade)
- Household Cavalry Regiment (1st Mechanised Brigade)
- 1st Battalion, Grenadier Guards (London District)
- 2nd Battalion (The Green Howards), Yorkshire Regiment (19th Light Brigade)
- 1st Battalion (Royal Welch Fusiliers), The Royal Welsh (1st Mechanised Brigade)
- 3rd Battalion, The Rifles (52nd Infantry Brigade)
- 1st Regiment, Royal Horse Artillery (3rd (UK) Mechanised Division)
- 28th Engineer Regiment, Royal Engineers (1st (UK) Armoured Division)
- 10th (Queen's Own Gurkha) Logistic Regiment, Royal Logistic Corps (101st Logistic Brigade)
- 104th Force Support Battalion, Royal Electrical and Mechanical Engineers (Equipment Support, Theatre Troops)
- 33rd Field Hospital, Royal Army Medical Corps (2nd Medical Brigade)
- 160 Provost Company, Royal Military Police, Adjutant General's Corps (4th Regiment, Royal Military Police)

On the brigade's return in April 2010, a total of 650 soldiers from the 12 regiments of the brigade marched through Winchester in Hampshire accompanied by three bands to celebrate their return. Later in June, around 120 soldiers then marched past the Palace of Westminster (Parliament of the United Kingdom).

Just a few months after the brigade's return in 2010, the brigade was disbanded and its units returned to their peacetime headquarters.

==== Army 2020 ====
In 2012, following the Strategic Defence and Security Review 2010, the Army 2020 programme was announced. As part of the mergers, the 2nd (South East) Infantry Brigade, which had regional responsibility for the south east counties (Kent, Surrey, and Sussex), and 145th (South) Brigade, which had regional responsibility for the south-central region (Thames Valley (Berkshire, Buckinghamshire, and Oxfordshire), Hampshire, and the Isle of Wight) were merged to form the new 11th Infantry Brigade and Headquarters South East.

The brigade's organisation was as follows by 2015:

- Brigade Headquarters, at Taurus House, Aldershot Garrison
- 1st Battalion, Welsh Guards, at Elizabeth Barracks, Pirbright Camp (Light Mechanised Infantry with Foxhound armoured cars)
- 1st Battalion, Grenadier Guards, at Lille Barracks, Aldershot Garrison (Light Infantry)
- 1st Battalion, The Royal Gurkha Rifles, at Sir John Moore Barracks, Shorncliffe (Light Infantry)
- The London Regiment (Army Reserve), HQ in Westminster (Light Infantry) – paired with the Grenadier Guards
- 3rd Battalion, The Royal Welsh (Army Reserve), HQ in Cardiff (Light Infantry) – paired with the Welsh Guards

==== Army 2020 Refine ====
In 2017, a supplement to the Army 2020 programme was announced entitled the Army 2020 Refine which reversed many of the unit-level changes. In addition to the unit level changes, several of the regional brigades formed under the initial Army 2020 programme were disbanded or reduced to Colonel-level commands. In 2019, a Field Army reorganisation saw these brigades lose their units permanently with the following changes occurring to the former units: Grenadier Guards and Welsh Guards transferred to London District (on rotation) and replaced by the Coldstream Guards and Irish Guards respectively, Royal Gurkha Rifles moved to 16th Air Assault Brigade, The London Regiment transferred to London District, and the 3rd Royal Welsh moved to the 12th Armoured Infantry Brigade.

Under the changes, the Coldstream and Irish Guards moved from London District, the 3rd Princess of Wales's Royal Regiment moved from 7th Infantry Brigade, and the 1st and 2nd Battalions, Royal Irish Regiment moved from 160th (Welsh) Brigade.

In 2019 with the brigade completely reorganised, its structure was now as follows by the end of 2021:

- Brigade Headquarters, at Taurus House, Aldershot Garrison
- 1st Battalion, Irish Guards, at Lille Barracks, Aldershot Garrison (Light Mechanised Infantry with Foxhound armoured cars)
- 1st Battalion, The Royal Irish Regiment, at Clive Barracks, Ternhill (Light Mechanised Infantry with Foxhound armoured cars)
- 1st Battalion, Coldstream Guards, at Victoria Barracks, Windsor (Light Infantry)
- 3rd Battalion, The Princess of Wales's Royal Regiment (Army Reserve), HQ at Leros Barracks, Canterbury
- 2nd Battalion, The Royal Irish Regiment (Army Reserve), HQ at Thiepval Barracks, Lisburn

==== 11th Security Force Assistance Brigade ====
On 30 November 2021, the Future Soldier changes were announced, and the brigade will transition from an infantry brigade into a security force assistance formation. In late 2021, the brigade was renamed as 11th Security Force Assistance Brigade, dropping its regional commitments, and will reorganise by 2022. The brigade's mission was described as follows:

The 11th Security Force Assistance Brigade draws on personnel and expertise from across the Army, to build the capacity of allied and partner nations. Routinely deployed around the world, Security Force Assistance units contribute to conflict prevention and resilience at an early stage. This activity is underpinned by the Defence's global foundation.

The brigade headquarters will remain in Aldershot, drop its regional commitments, and unit moves will be as follows: Coldstream Guards move to 4th Light Brigade Combat Team (BCT) – formerly 4th Infantry Brigade & HQ North East; 2nd Royal Irish Regiment move to 19th Reserve Brigade – a new formation; 3rd Princess of Wales's Royal Regiment moved to 20th Armoured BCT as mechanised infantry; 1st Royal Irish Regiment moves to 16th Air Assault Brigade as 'light strike reconnaissance infantry'; and the Irish Guards will remain part of the brigade. The following units will join the brigade in 2022: The Black Watch (3rd Battalion, Royal Regiment of Scotland) from 51st Infantry Brigade; 1st Royal Anglian Regiment from British Forces Cyprus (will join on return from Cyprus in 2023); 3rd The Rifles joins in 2024 from 51st Infantry Brigade; 4th Princess of Wales's Royal Regiment joins from 7th Infantry Brigade; and finally the Outreach and Cultural Support Group will join from 77th Brigade.

In November 2024, the brigade resubordinated from the 1st (UK) Division to Field Army Troops. The brigade became 11th Brigade, dropping its Security Force Assistance responsibility, and returning to a combat role as part of the Land Special Operations Force. The brigade will learn to fight as a tactical recce-strike force and will take part in training packages in Kenya and the Baltics in 2025.

The brigade's structure in 2026 is:

- Brigade Headquarters, at Woodgate House, Aldershot Garrison
- 1st Battalion, Irish Guards, at Mons Barracks, Aldershot Garrison
- 1st Battalion, Royal Anglian Regiment, at Kendrew Barracks, Cottesmore
- 2nd Battalion, Royal Yorkshire Regiment, at Dale Barracks, Chester
- 3rd Battalion, Royal Regiment of Scotland, at Fort George, Inverness – to move to Leuchars Station not before 2029
- 3rd Battalion, The Rifles, at Dreghorn Barracks, Edinburgh – to move to Weeton Barracks, Blackpool not before 2027
- 4th Battalion, Princess of Wales's Royal Regiment (Army Reserve), at Linkfield House, Redhill
- Joint CIMIC Group, at Mellor Building, Aldershot Garrison – to move to Alexander Barracks, Pirbright Camp not before 2027

The brigade led a programme to train members of the Armed Forces of Ukraine during the Russo-Ukrainian War as part of Operation Orbital (2015–2022) and Operation Interflex (2022).

In June 2026, the Ministry of Defence ordered 270 Toyota Hilux Invincible X 4x4s were ordered for the brigade at a cost of £19.7m under Project Niala.

== See also ==
- Security Force Assistance Brigade
