= St George's Church, Eastergate =

St George's Church
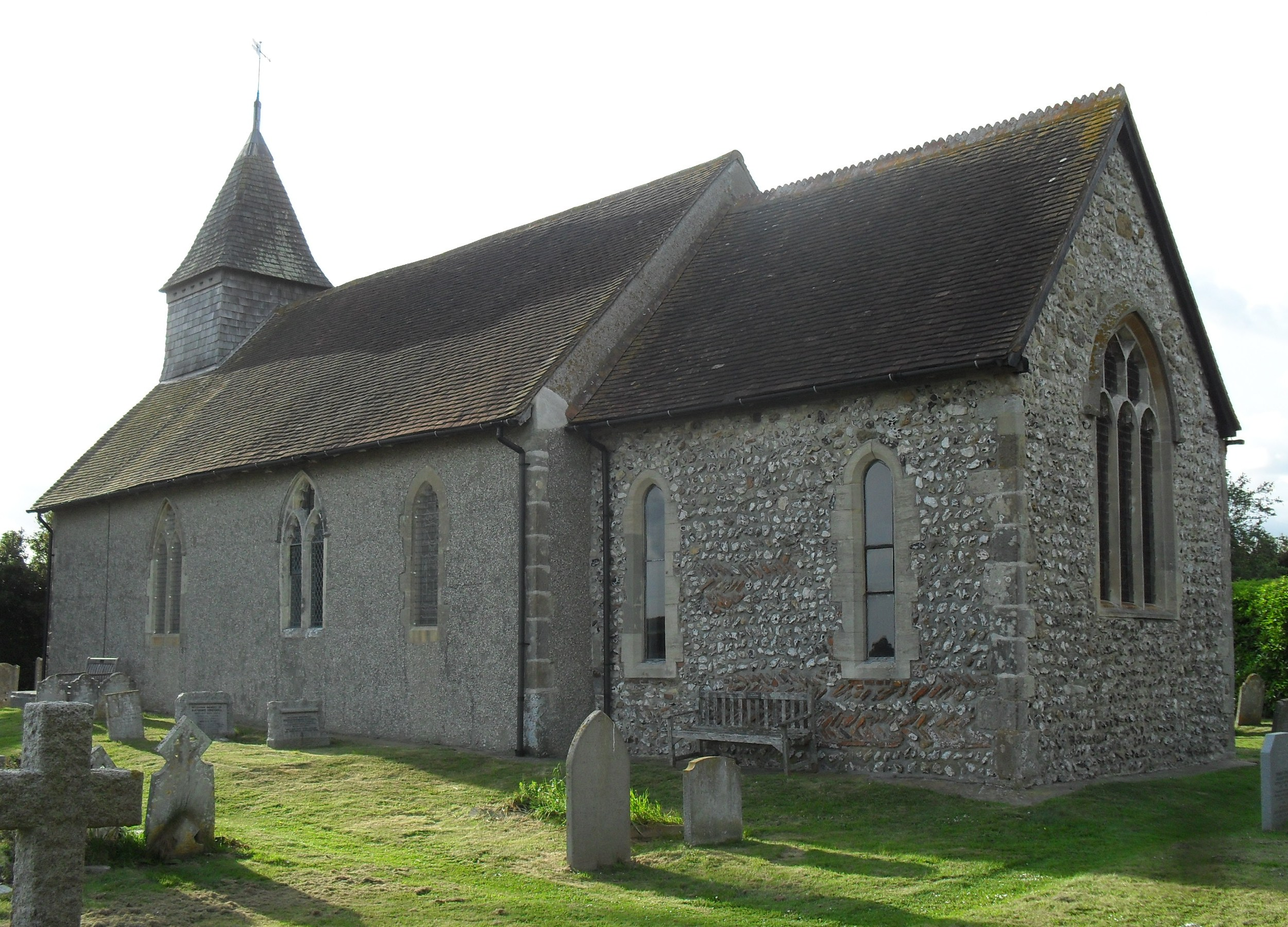
- The church from the southeast
- St George's Church
- 50.8377°N 0.6591°W
- Location: Church Lane, Eastergate, West Sussex PO20 3UX
- Country: England
- Denomination: Church of England
- Website: www.parishofabe.org.uk/page5.html

History
- Status: Parish church
- Founded: 11th century
- Dedication: Saint George

Architecture
- Functional status: Active
- Heritage designation: Grade II*
- Designated: 5 June 1958
- Style: Norman architecture

Administration
- Province: Canterbury
- Diocese: Chichester
- Archdeaconry: Chichester
- Deanery: Rural Deanery of Arundel and Bognor
- Parish: Aldingbourne, Barnham and Eastergate

Clergy
- Rector: Rev. Simon Holland

St George's Church is an Anglican church in the village of Eastergate in West Sussex, England. It is the ancient parish church of Eastergate, although since 1992 it has been administered as part of a joint ecclesiastical parish with the churches in neighbouring Barnham and Aldingbourne. As part of this group, the building is still in regular use for worship on Sundays and weekdays. Eastergate village school has links with the church, and pupils regularly attend services.

There is historic and structural evidence of a Saxon place of worship on the site, and some 11th-century work survives in the chancel, but the present appearance of the church is mostly 13th-century. It was then restored in the Victorian era, and some further rebuilding work was undertaken in the 20th century.

The "long, straggling village" of Eastergate is administratively located in the district of Arun, one of seven local government districts in West Sussex. The church is in a rural situation south of the village street; it is approached through a farmyard next to the manor house, and a "magnificent" Elizabethan granary building that was originally part of the farm has been used by the church for various purposes since the 1970s. English Heritage has listed both buildings for their architectural and historical importance: St George's Church at Grade II*, and the former granary at the lower Grade II.

== History ==
In its earliest form, the parish of Eastergate covered 918 acres (372 ha) of flat, flood-prone land on the Sussex coastal plain, about 4 miles (6.4 km) northeast of the modern seaside resort of Bognor Regis and a similar distance southwest of the ancient town of Arundel. Romans apparently occupied the area, and may have established a villa near the modern village. A church in the parish was recorded in the Domesday survey of 1086; it was near the western edge of the parish, so St Mary the Virgin's Church at Barnham was more convenient for some parishioners, and likewise some residents of the neighbouring parish of Aldingbourne worshipped at Eastergate. By the following year, it was associated with the Norman Abbey of Séez, whose other holdings in the area included the manors of Atherington (with Bailiffscourt Chapel) and Littlehampton.

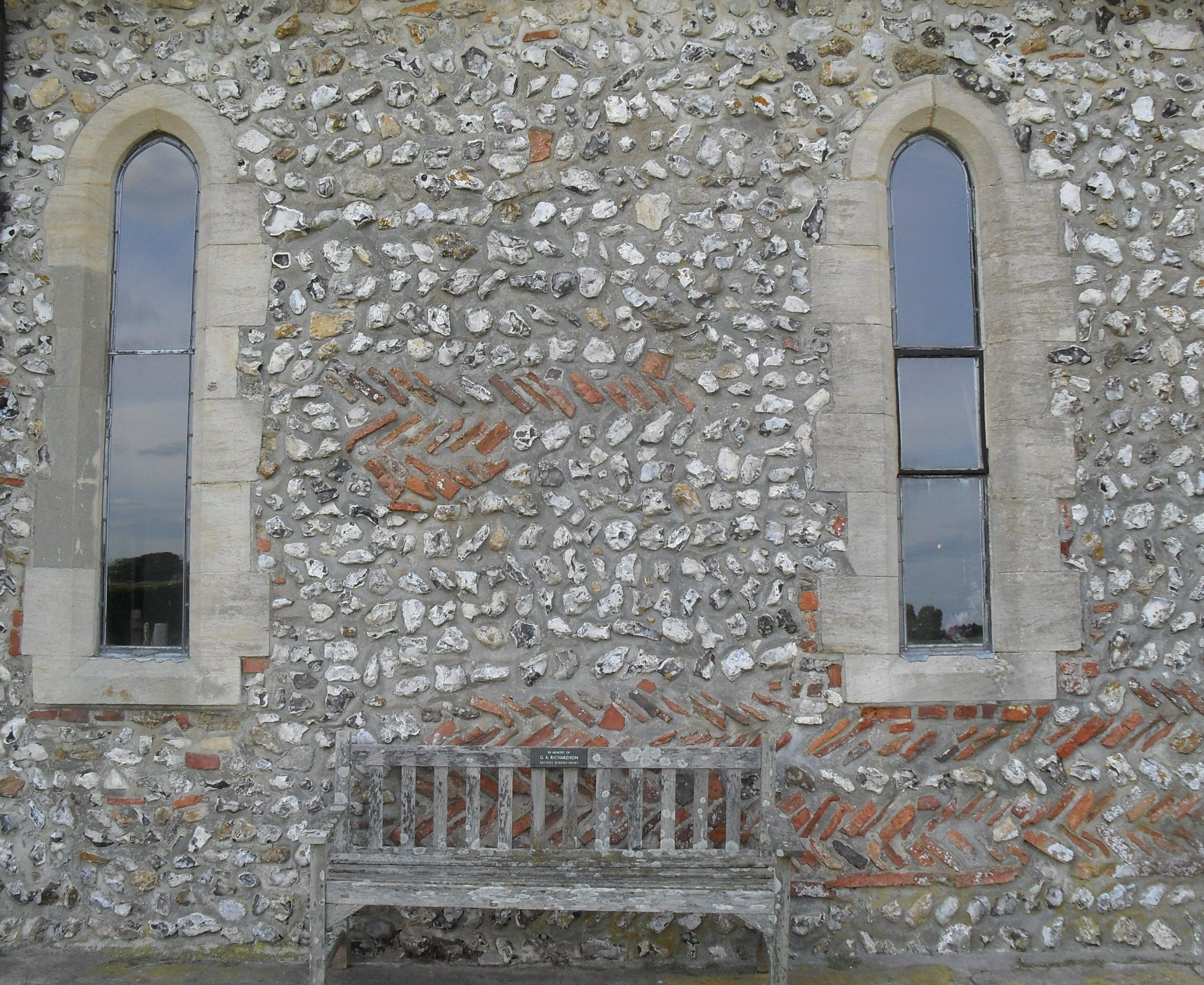
The south wall of the chancel has ancient herringbone pattern brickwork using Roman bricks.

The present building was started around the time of the Norman conquest of England. Several church historians have come to different conclusions about its origins: it has been suggested that the chancel is Saxon, that the whole building is the one recorded in the Domesday Book, that it is "possibly pre-Conquest", or that (per Gerard Baldwin Brown) it dates from "within 50 years of the Norman conquest" and lacks any "distinctive Saxon features". An ancient surviving feature is the herringbone pattern masonry in the south wall of the chancel: this extends to about 8 square inches (52 cm^{2}) and is up to 2 inches (5.1 cm) thick. Some more herringbone brickwork, now covered up, exists in the south wall of the nave. Much Roman brickwork has been reused, both in the herringbone work and in the form of a 18-by-2-inch (45.7 cm × 5.1 cm) course of long bricks in the south wall of the chancel. Again, sources disagree as to whether this reuse of old material is a late Saxon or early Norman feature. Elsewhere, only one window survives from the church's earliest times: a "primitive" narrow opening in the north wall of the chancel.

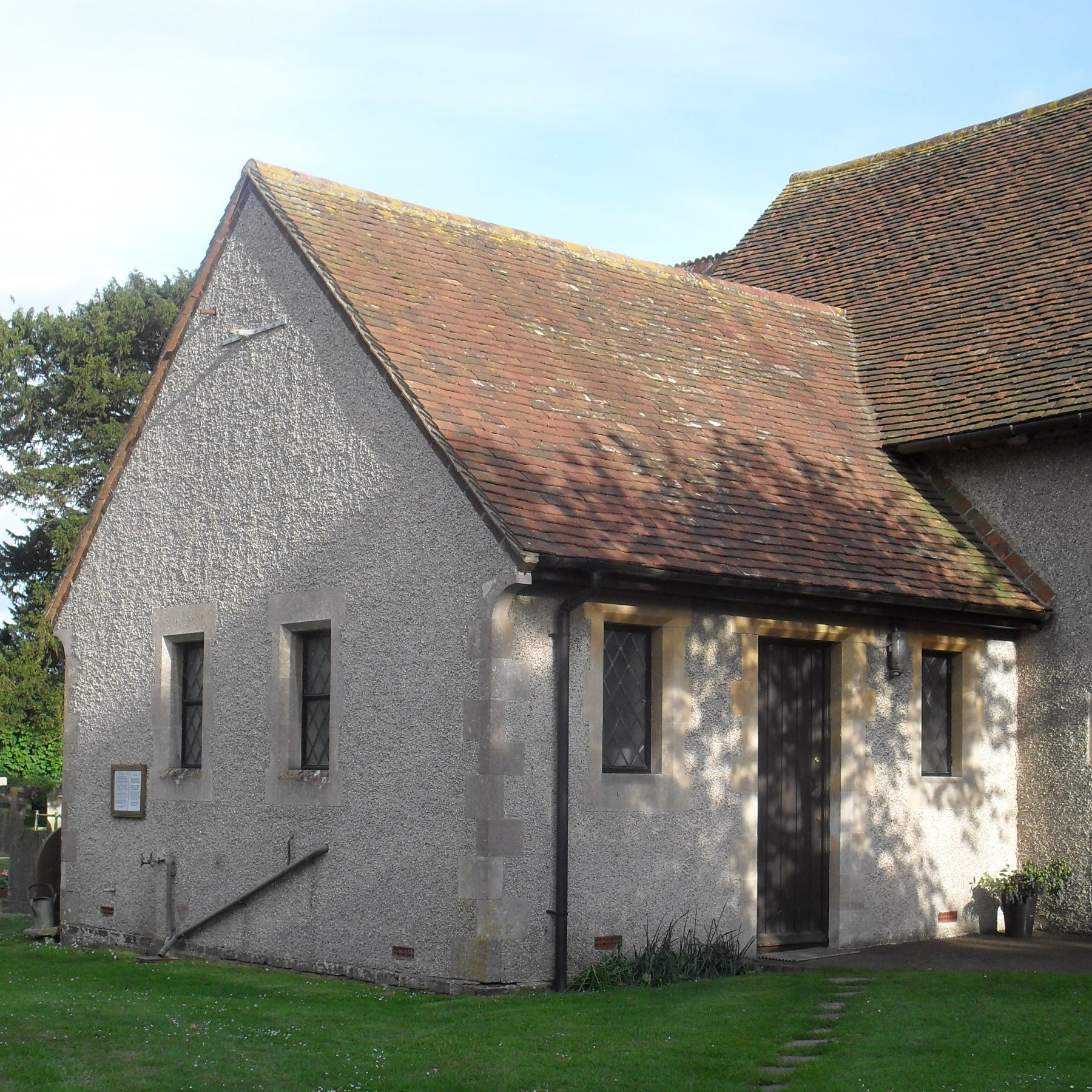
This vestry was added in the 1920s.

The nave in its present form dates from the 13th and 14th centuries: no features remain from the original structure. There is a wide range of medieval windows throughout, ranging from 14th-century openings in the nave and Early English Gothic lancets in the chancel to a 15th-century Perpendicular Gothic east window in the chancel and an arched window of 1534 in the west wall. The church was re-roofed internally in two stages: the nave in the 16th century (it was given a crown post roof), and the chancel in the following century.

A structural survey in 1776 indicated that the chancel was deteriorating but the nave was sound. The first round of Victorian restoration came in 1856, when a gallery was inserted; the chancel was rebuilt and heightened between 1876 and 1877; and in 1883 the nave was altered, a vestry was added, the gallery was taken out and a wooden bell-turret was built at the west end of the building. Nikolaus Pevsner stated that after this work, the church was "too heavily restored to be attractive", and others have noted that the present appearance of the church is derived mostly from its 19th-century modifications. Later work included the replacement of the Victorian vestry with a new equivalent in the 1920s, the replacement of some stained glass and internal fittings around the same time, and the provision of modern facilities including a "welcome area" near the entrance, toilets, kitchen facilities, new heating and better lighting in 2000. A modern wooden sculpture of Saint George has also been provided, and a late-20th-century tapestry commemorates the history of Eastergate parish and the church. It makes reference to the Domesday Book entry for the village, which uses its original name of Gate.

== Architecture ==
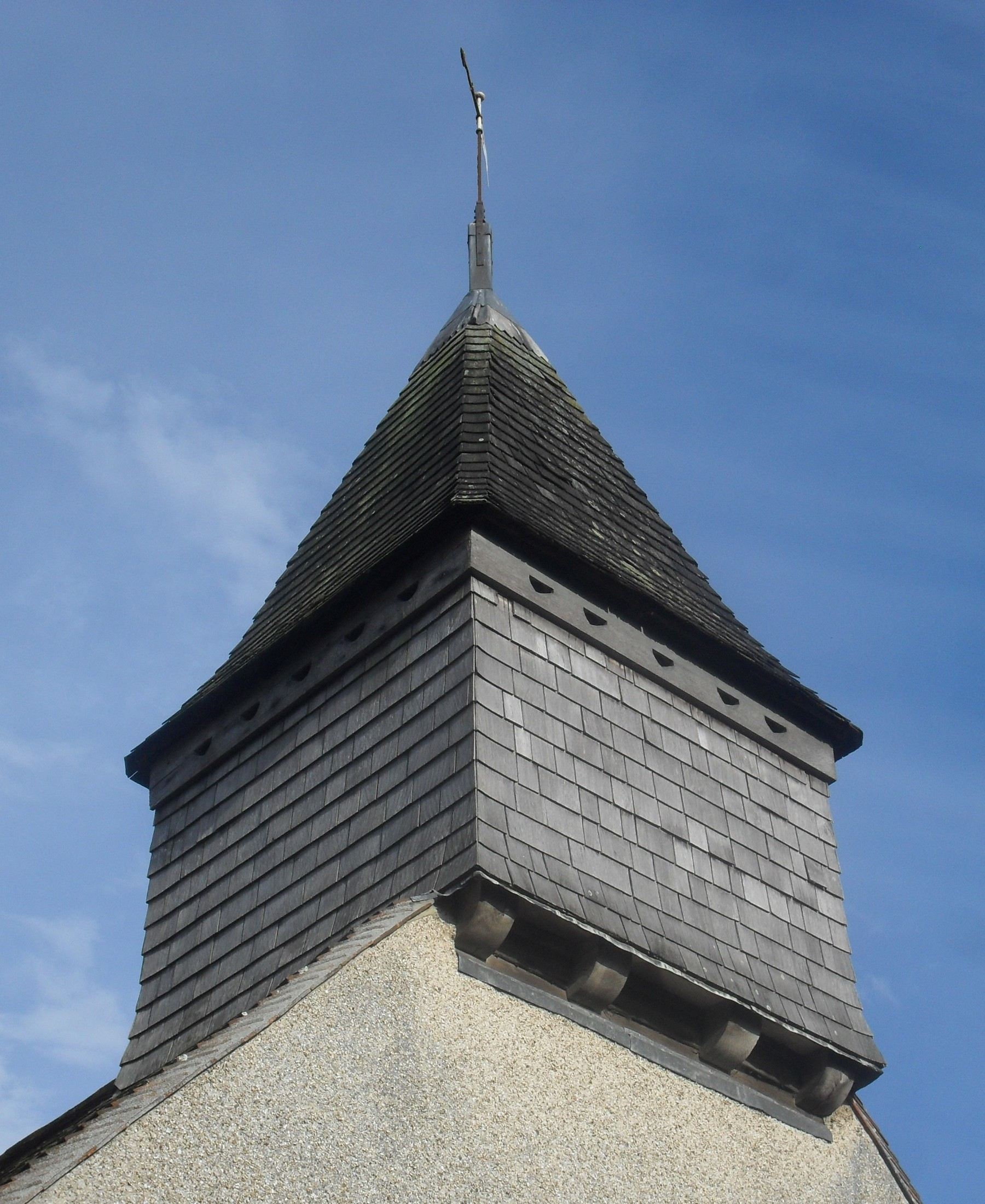
This overhanging shingled bell-turret sits on top of the tiled roof.

St George's Church has a nave with no aisles, a narrower chancel and a bell-turret at the west end of the roof. There is a vestry on the north side. Most walls are roughcast covering flint rubble; the chancel is mostly of uncovered flint with some herringbone brickwork. The roof is tiled, and the bell-turret is laid with shingles. It is an "uncomplicated building with no buttresses" and little ornamentation, although Nikolaus Pevsner described the offset, overhanging bell-turret as "frilly". It contains a single bell dated 1737 and inscribed with the name of a former churchwarden. Enclosed shingled bell-turrets were uncommon in the Victorian era: the addition of open-sided stone-built bellcotes was more popular.

The nave measures 42 1/2 by 18 feet (13.0 m × 5.5 m). At the corners are quoins made up of stones of various sizes—as large as 2 1/3 feet (0.71 m) tall in one case. A 14th-century doorway survives on the north side, although it is now walled up. The lancet windows date from the 14th and 15th centuries but have been restored. One on the south side has the remains of some contemporary stained glass showing the coats of arms of the FitzAlans (the Earls of Arundel) and the de Warennes (the Earls of Surrey). Designed in quarters, it dates from the 1360s. The others are paired lancets with cinquefoil (five-lobed) lights above. In the west wall of the nave is a three-light window paid for in 1534 under the terms of a will; it has plain arched heads without cusping. Money from the same bequest paid for a small extension (12 feet (3.7 m)) to the nave, and a new doorway was added at the same time.

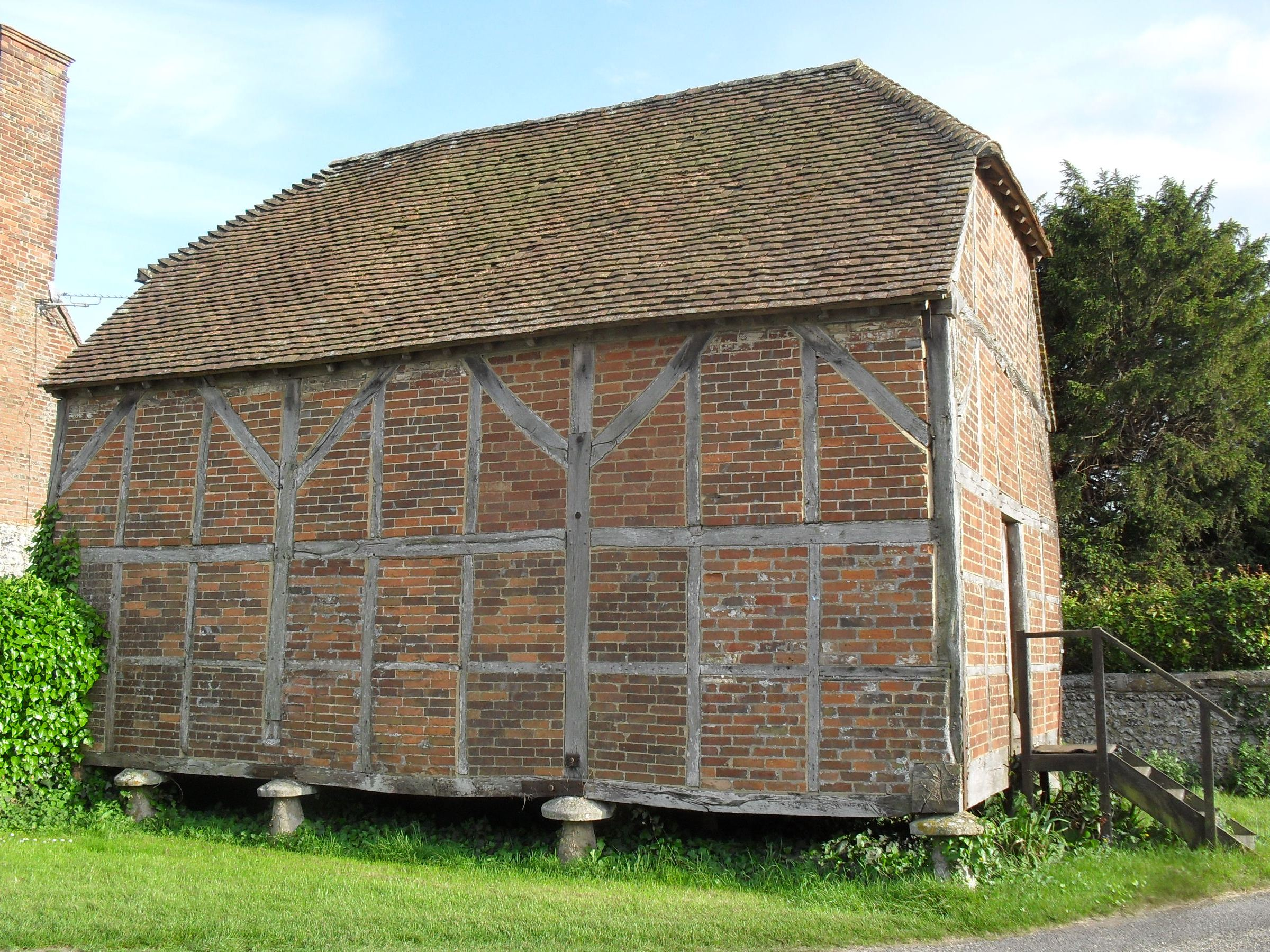
This 17th-century half-timbered granary is used for church activities.

The chancel's dimensions are 15 1/4 by 13 1/2 feet (4.6 m × 4.1 m). As on the nave walls, there are stone quoins. The oldest surviving window in the church is a slit-style Norman opening in its north wall. On the outside, the jambs are formed of three substantial stones with slight chamfering—the lowest and uppermost laid flat and the middle stone standing upright. Between them is a sloping sill, and at the top a semicircular arch connects the jambs. It is placed high in the wall, just below the roofline. The south wall has two 13th-century windows, and the three-light east window of the 15th century has stained glass as a memorial to Herbert Kitchener, 1st Earl Kitchener. Internal fittings include 18th-century altar rails and a rare pair of priest's stalls in a mixed Gothic and Classical style, dating from the early 19th century. They face each other across the chancel and consist of paired wooden pillars and an "oddly out of place ... severely Classical" tester. Fragments of wall paintings of the 11th and 12th centuries remain above some of the chancel windows: they were uncovered in 1907. These were "convincingly linked to the 'Lewes Group' of 12th-century wall paintings in the Sussex churches of Hardham, Clayton and Coombes." In 2003, the collapse of a wall monument revealed traces of painting on the exposed plaster beneath. A palimpsest was present with traces of post-Reformation text painting. This has been conserved as a 'window' on the historic plasters and painting layers.

The church is reached by walking through the grounds of Manor Farm; it is common for ancient Sussex churches to stand close to farms, but for one to stand in a farmyard is unusual. Standing outside the approach to the church is a "magnificent" granary apparently dating from the 17th century (one source attributes it to the late Elizabethan or early Stuart period, and others claim a date of 1600). The hipped-roofed building is constructed of red brick with timber framing. It stands on staddle stones—mushroom-shaped supports that lift the structure clear of the ground as a safeguard against damp and vermin. Some restoration has been carried out. Originally, it was part of the neighbouring Manor Farm—"one of the best farmhouses in this part of Sussex" according to Nikolaus Pevsner—but since the 1970s it has been used for various purposes by St George's Church.

== The church today ==
St George's Church was listed at Grade II* by English Heritage on 5 June 1958. Such buildings are defined as "particularly important [and] of more than special interest". As of February 2001, it was one of 24 Grade II* listed buildings, and 960 listed buildings of all grades, in the district of Arun. The former granary near the church entrance was listed at Grade II on the same date. Buildings listed at this grade are "nationally important and of special interest". Both the church and the farm are also part of the Eastergate (Church Lane) Conservation Area, one of 33 conservation areas in Arun. In its assessment of the area, which was designated in June 1992, the district council stated that it "retains its rural character and the essential historic characteristics of a rural agricultural settlement based on the manor house, St George's Church and farm buildings".

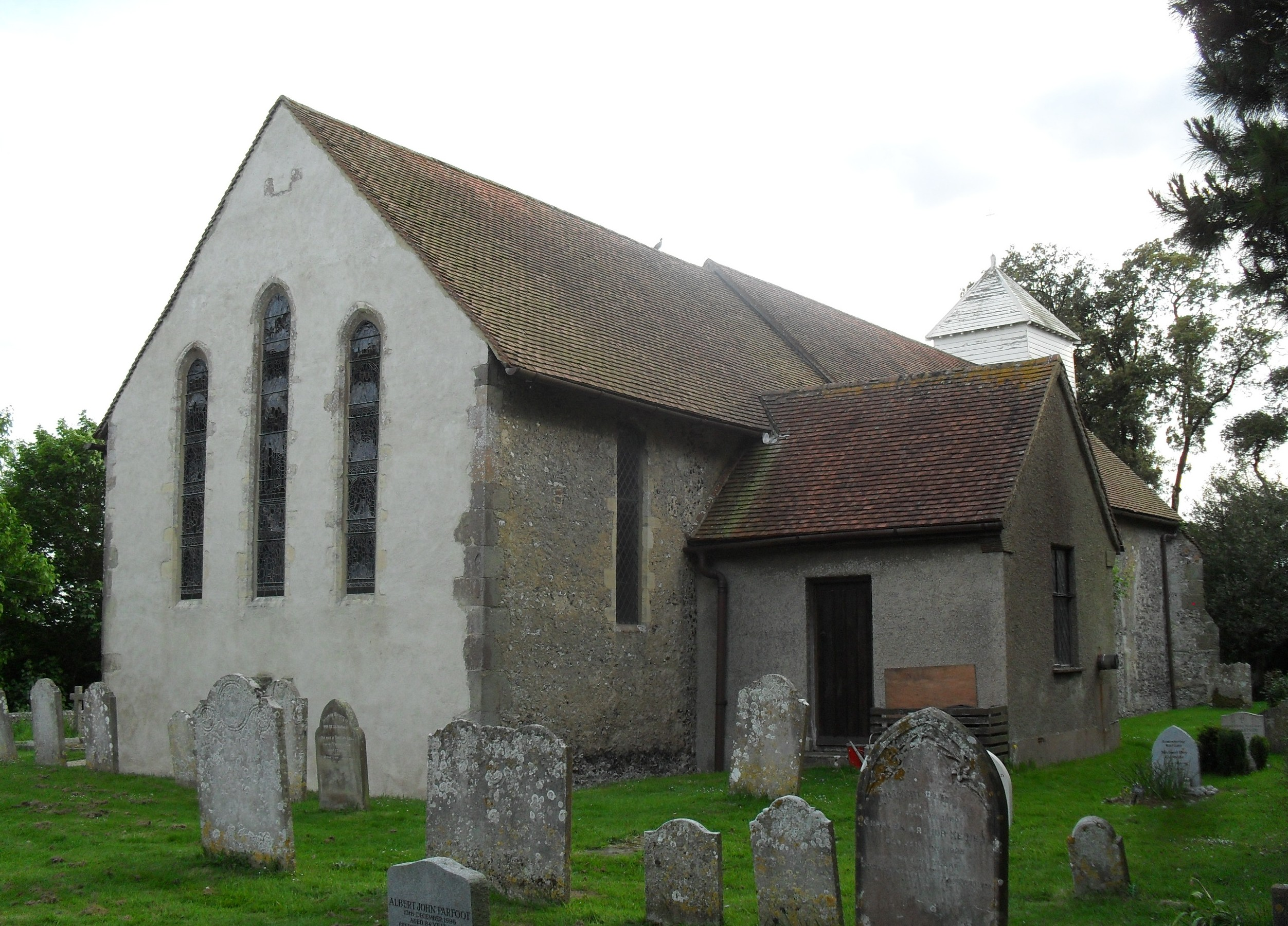
St Mary the Virgin's Church at Barnham

The ecclesiastical parish includes St Mary the Virgin's Church, Aldingbourne, St Mary the Virgin's Church, Barnham and St George's Church. It covers the three villages and the surrounding rural area, and hamlets such as Norton, Fontwell, Lidsey and Woodgate. The larger village of Westergate is also part of the parish. St George's is one of 30 Anglican churches in the Rural Deanery of Arundel and Bognor, a division within the Archdeaconry of Chichester and the Diocese of Chichester.

Regular services are held in the church, which can accommodate 80 worshippers with ease. On special festivals it often accommodates in excess of 150 worshippers Every Sunday morning, Mattins and Holy Communion are celebrated using the Book of Common Prayer. A family service, usually with Holy Communion, is held at 10.00 am, and at 6.00 pm there is an evening prayer service or Evensong, depending on the Sunday of the month. A Holy Communion service also takes place on Wednesday mornings.

The present rectory was built in the 1920s and given to the Parish by the Davenport family in 1976 on the main road to Barnham, but two earlier buildings were also used for this purpose. The rector was known to live in the village by 1440, and the original rectory was first described in 1473. Vacated by the early 18th century, it became ruinous and was demolished in the 1830s in favour of a Tudor-style flint building on Church Lane. This was used by the rector until the present building was donated.

== See also ==
- List of places of worship in Arun
- Media related to St George's Church, Eastergate at Wikimedia Commons
