= Charles Bertie Prowse =

British Army officer (1869–1916)

Brigadier-General Charles Bertie Prowse DSO
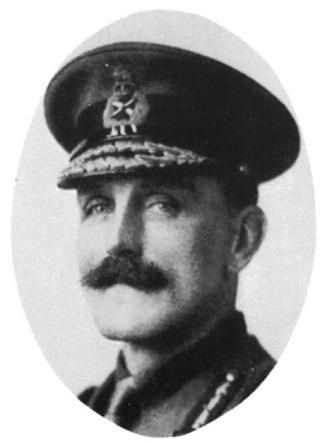
- Born: June 23, 1869; West Monkton, England
- Died: July 1, 1916 (aged 47); Battle of the Somme, France
- Military career
- Allegiance: United Kingdom
- Branch: British Army
- Service years: 1889–1916 †
- Rank: Brigadier-General (temporary rank); Lieutenant-Colonel (brevet rank); Major (substantive rank)
- Commands: 1st battalion, Prince Albert's (Somerset Light Infantry) Regiment (1914–1915); 1st battalion, Prince of Wales's Leinster Regiment (Royal Canadians) (1915); 11th Infantry Brigade (1915–1916)
- Conflicts: Second Boer War; First World War
- Awards: Distinguished Service Order; Mentioned in Despatches three times

Brigadier-General Charles Bertie Prowse, DSO (23 June 1869 – 1 July 1916) was a British Army officer. He joined the militia battalion of Prince Albert's (Somerset Light Infantry) Regiment in 1889 and transferred to a regular battalion in 1892. Prowse served in the Second Boer War from 1899 to 1902 with his regiment and as a staff officer. He was twice mentioned in despatches by Field Marshal Lord Roberts and received promotion to captain. Prowse became a major in 1914.

Prowse fought in many of the early actions of the First World War and commanded his battalion in action at Ploegsteert Wood, where a farm was named Prowse Point in his honour. He was mentioned in despatches by General John French on 8 October 1914 and four days later promoted to lieutenant-colonel. He briefly commanded the Prince of Wales's Leinster Regiment (Royal Canadians) before being promoted to brigadier-general in April 1915 and given command of the 11th Infantry Brigade. Prowse led his brigade in an attack on the first day on the Somme, where he was killed by machine-gun fire.

== Early life and career ==
Charles Bertie Prowse was born in West Monkton near Taunton, Somerset, on 23 June 1869. He was the third son of Captain George James William Prowse, JP, and Emmeline Lucy, daughter of the barrister Thomas Messiter, JP, of Barwick. Prowse attended Cornish's School in Clevedon, Somerset, and then Marlborough College in Wiltshire.

Prowse was appointed a second lieutenant in the 3rd (Militia) Battalion of Prince Albert's (Somerset Light Infantry) Regiment on 18 April 1889. He rose to the rank of lieutenant but dropped back to second lieutenant when he transferred into one of the regiment’s regular battalions (1st or 2nd) on 12 October 1892. On 11 July 1899 at Northam Parish Church, he married Violet Stanley Scott, the daughter of Colonel Stanley Scott of Cross House in Northam, Devon, an officer in the Bombay Staff Corps. Charles and Violet Prowse had a daughter, Violet Muriel, the next year, and also had a son, Charles Anthony Stanley.

Prowse served in the Second Boer War from 1899 to 1902, by which time he had regained the rank of lieutenant. He was seconded to the army's railway staff on 16 June 1900 and was mentioned in despatches by Field Marshal Lord Roberts on 8 February and 4 September 1901. During the war he served as a staff officer and was present at the Relief of Ladysmith and at the battles of Spion Kop, Vaal Krantz and the Tugela Heights, serving also in Natal, Transvaal, the Orange River Colony, and the Cape Colony, and receiving the Queen's Medal with five clasps and the King's Medal with two. He was his battalion's adjutant by 14 August 1901 when he was promoted to captain.

On 12 December 1904, Prowse was seconded to his regiment's 1st Volunteer Battalion (a former Volunteer Force battalion) as adjutant, holding that role until 12 December 1909, when he returned to a regular battalion. Prowse was promoted to the rank of major on 21 April 1914.

== First World War ==
Prowse took part in many of the early British actions of the First World War, which broke out in July 1914. A memorial to Prowse in St Mary Magdalene church, in Taunton notes that Prowse fought in the Retreat from Mons, the Battle of Le Cateau, the First Battle of the Marne and the First Battle of Ypres, all in 1914. He commanded the 1st Battalion of his regiment in action near Ploegsteert Wood in late 1914 and a farm in that area was named Prowse Point after him. Prowse was mentioned in despatches by Field Marshal Sir John French on 8 October 1914. He was promoted to the temporary rank of lieutenant-colonel on 12 October, and this was upgraded to brevet rank on 3 November.

He was briefly placed in command of the 1st Battalion of the Prince of Wales's Leinster Regiment (Royal Canadians) but in April 1915 was promoted to the temporary rank of brigadier general and given command of the 11th Infantry Brigade after its former commander, Julian Hasler, had been killed. Prowse was awarded the Distinguished Service Order (DSO) on 3 June 1916.

=== First day on the Somme ===
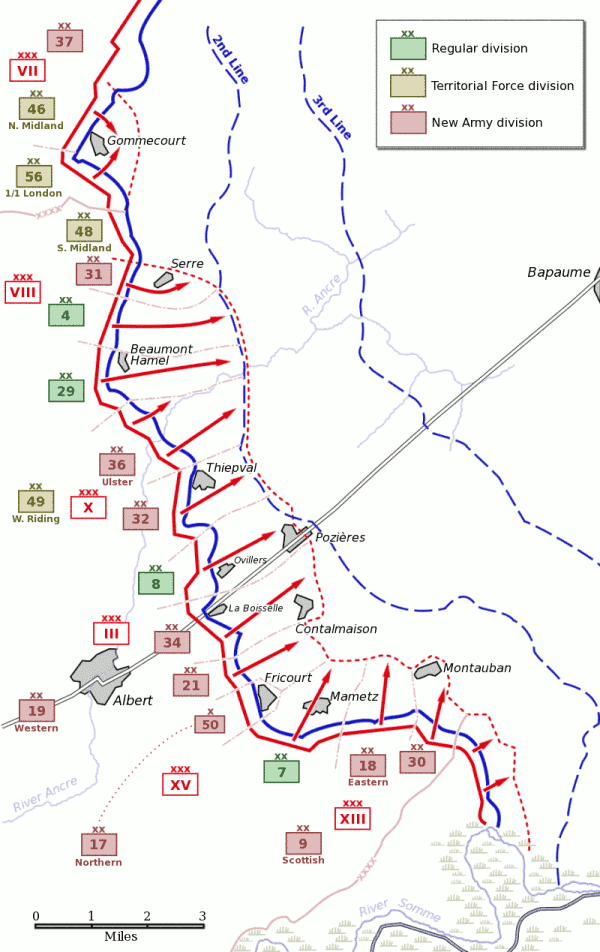
British plans for the first day of the Somme. The 11th Brigade attacked as part of the 4th Division between Beaumont Hamel and Serre.

On 1 July 1916 Prowse led the 11th Infantry Brigade in the first day of the Battle of the Somme. His unit's objectives were the German lines between the fortifications of Redan Ridge Redoubt and the Quadrilateral (known to the Germans as Heidenkopf). north of Beaumont Hamel in front of Serre-lès-Puisieux. The attacks of the 11th Brigade and the wider 4th Infantry Division, largely failed to take and hold the German positions, though some success was achieved at the Quadrilateral. At 9:45 am, in the belief that it had been secured, Prowse attempted to move his headquarters forward to the Quadrilateral. Prowse was in the process of climbing out of the British forward trench, while organising a party of Seaforth Highlanders near an area of the front line known as Brett Street, when he was hit in the back by machine gun fire from the German positions at Redan Ridge Redoubt. An eyewitness, Lieutenant G. A. Robinson, noted "Brigadier-General Prowse showed great gallantry in his efforts, ignoring the great breaches in our parapet, exposing himself to great danger". Arthur Conan Doyle, in a 1916 book, claimed Prowse had been killed whilst telling his troops to "remember that they were the Stonewall Brigade".

The two German machine guns in the Redan Ridge Redoubt had caused many casualties that day. Prowse's brigade major, Lieutenant-Colonel W. A. T. S. Somerville, considered them the main cause of the failure of the 11th Infantry Brigade's attack. Prowse died of his wounds that afternoon. Of the six 11th Brigade battalion commanders in action on 1 July two were wounded and four killed.

== Commemoration ==
Prowse was originally buried, alongside some of his comrades, at a cemetery at Vauchelles-lès-Authie established for use by a field ambulance unit. In 1919 some of his comrades laid a plaque on his grave marked "as a tribute to his memory from his Old Comrades of the 7th Bn Somerset LI". Because the Vauchelles did not receive many burials, after the war it was consolidated into the Louvencourt Military Cemetery near Louvencourt. Prowse and the seven other burials were buried next to each other on the same row; the Louvencourt cemetery is near to the 11th Infantry Brigade's 1 July battlefield. Prowse's grave is marked with the engraving chosen by his family "Be thou faithful unto death and I will give thee a crown of life". The wooden grave marker cross from Prowse's Vauchelles burial is now on display in St Mary Magdalene Church.

In 1921 a stained-glass window designed by Henry Holiday was installed in the Church of St John the Baptist, Yeovil, in the memory of Prowse and his brother, Royal Navy Captain Cecil Irby Prowse. Cecil commanded the battlecruiser HMS Queen Mary and was lost, with most of his crew, at the Battle of Jutland on 31 May 1916, just weeks before Charles Bertie Prowse was killed in action. Prowse was also commemorated by the army with a fortification on the Somme, near Auchonvillers, named Fort Prowse; the concrete fort was partially destroyed by German shellfire. Prowse has the unusual honour of having given his name, indirectly, to a Commonwealth War Graves Commission cemetery. The Prowse Point cemetery was named after the farm on the Ploegsteert Wood battlefield. It is the only cemetery in the Ypres Salient to be named after a person.

== See also ==
- List of generals of the British Empire who died during the First World War
