= Ormiston Six Villages Academy =

Location
- Lime Avenue; Westergate, West Sussex, PO20 3UE; England; 50°50′26″N 0°39′51″W

Information
- Type: Academy
- Established: 2013
- Department for Education URN: 140199 Tables
- Ofsted: Reports
- Principal: Paul Slaughter
- Gender: Coeducational
- Age: 11 to 16
- Houses: Wiston, Petworth, Goodwood
- Colours: Blue, Yellow Red
- Website: http://www.ormistonsixvillagesacademy.co.uk/

Ormiston Six Villages Academy (formerly Westergate Community School) is a coeducational secondary school for 11 to 16-year-old students (Y7-11) with academy status, located in Westergate, West Sussex, England.

The six villages are Barnham, Eastergate, Westergate, Walberton, Fontwell and Yapton.

The school converted to academy status on 1 November 2013 and is part of the Ormiston Academies Trust.

The academy was recently rated as ‘Good’ by Ofsted in their most recent inspection occurring in 2022.
