= Equipment Support, Theatre Troops =

Former military formation of the British Army

- Active: 2001 (or 2003) – 2010 (or 2012)
- Country: United Kingdom
- Branch: British Army
- Role: Maintenance and Equipment Support
- Size: Colonel's Command
- Part of: Theatre Troops
- Group HQ: Airfield Camp, Netheravon
- Abbreviated Title: 'ES, TH TPS'

Commanders
- Commander: Commander Equipment Support, Theatre Troops

Equipment Support, Theatre Troops (ESTT/ES, TT/ES, TH TPS) was an ad-hoc group of maintenance and equipment support units of the British Army's Royal Electrical and Mechanical Engineers.

== History ==
=== Background ===
Following the Options for Change in 1991, the former regional districts were disbanded in 1995 and subsequently subsumed into the new 'regenerative divisions'. Unlike their predecessors, the new divisions did not take control of the regional Royal Electrical and Mechanical Engineers (REME) support units. In addition, those forces within the United Kingdom were reorganised into Land Command, which needed equipment support but had no centralised structure to deal with its needs. Following the 'Options' all REME needs were overseen by a two-star Director General Equipment Support (Army) (DGES(A)), based in Andover. However, in practice this two-star director needed to split his duties between supporting the Army's field forces, and in 1995 the directorate was split. DGES(A) split its responsibilities between the new 'forward commanders', known as 'Commanders, Equipment Support', which were subordinate to each division and command. This was soon reversed and equipment support was centred under the Equipment Support Directorate, HQ Land Command and DGES(A).

=== Formation ===
As a result of the Strategic Defence Review of 1998-1999, a new two-star general's command was created, designated as Headquarters Theatre Troops. The new command was placed under control of Land Command and oversaw all support and manoeuvre troops tasked with supporting the army via specialist roles.

In 2000, the equipment support functions at HQ Land Command was headed by a one-star REME officer (Brigadier Mike Huntly). However, with the planned formation of the Defence Logistics Organisation, the role of this position and indeed the Equipment Support Directorate was slowly diminishing.

Following the 'Landmark' reorganisation, two separate equipment support headquarters were placed under Commander Theatre Troops. Headquarters Royal Logistic Corps, Territorial Army (TA) headquartered at Prince William of Gloucester Barracks in Grantham, Lincolnshire and Equipment Support, Theatre Troops, headquartered at HQ Theatre Troops at Airfield Camp, Netheravon in Wiltshire. The former oversaw the specialist TA units of the Royal Logistic Corps and the latter oversaw the specialist separate units of the Royal Electrical and Mechanical Engineers (REME).

The new organisation was commanded by the former Commander, Headquarters Royal Electrical and Mechanical Engineers, Territorial Army (Commander HQ REME TA), who had also been double-hatted as the Deputy Commander, Combat Service Support Group United Kingdom (soon to become 101st Logistic Brigade), and as such the TA responsivities seized. At the same time as the creation of ES, TS, the Commander ES, Land Command post was disestablished.

== Organisation ==
By 2007, and group was more-or-less an administrative ad-hoc group which provided support to HQ Theatre Troops for equipment and maintenance units. The following units were under the administrative control of the group:

- Headquarters, Equipment Support, Theatre Troops, at Airfield Camp, Netheravon
  - 1st Close Support Company, Royal Electrical and Mechanical Engineers, at Prince Philip Barracks, Bordon – operationally subordinated to 101st Logistic Brigade
  - 2nd Close Support Company, Royal Electrical and Mechanical Engineers, at Rochdale Barracks, Bielefeld – operationally subordinated to 102nd Logistic Brigade
  - 46th General Support Company, Royal Electrical and Mechanical Engineers, at Thiepval Barracks, Lisburn – operationally subordinated to Northern Ireland Support Battalion, 38th (Irish) Brigade
  - 50th Off-Platform Repair Company, Royal Electrical and Mechanical Engineers – operationally subordinated to United Kingdom Support Command (Germany)
  - 101st Force Support Battalion, Royal Electrical and Mechanical Engineers (Volunteers) (TA), HQ at Hightown Barracks, Wrexham
  - 102nd Battalion, Royal Electrical and Mechanical Engineers (Volunteers) (TA), HQ at Aycliffe Armoury, Newton Aycliffe
  - 103rd Battalion, Royal Electrical and Mechanical Engineers (Volunteers) (TA), HQ in Crawley
  - 104th Battalion, Royal Electrical and Mechanical Engineers, HQ at Louisburg Barracks, Bordon (Hybrid, Regular/TA)

It is unknown when the group was disbanded, however it is known that the group had disappeared by 2012 and the consequential Army 2020 programme.
