= Eastergate =

Village and parish in West Sussex, England

Coordinates: 50.84166°N 0.65792°W

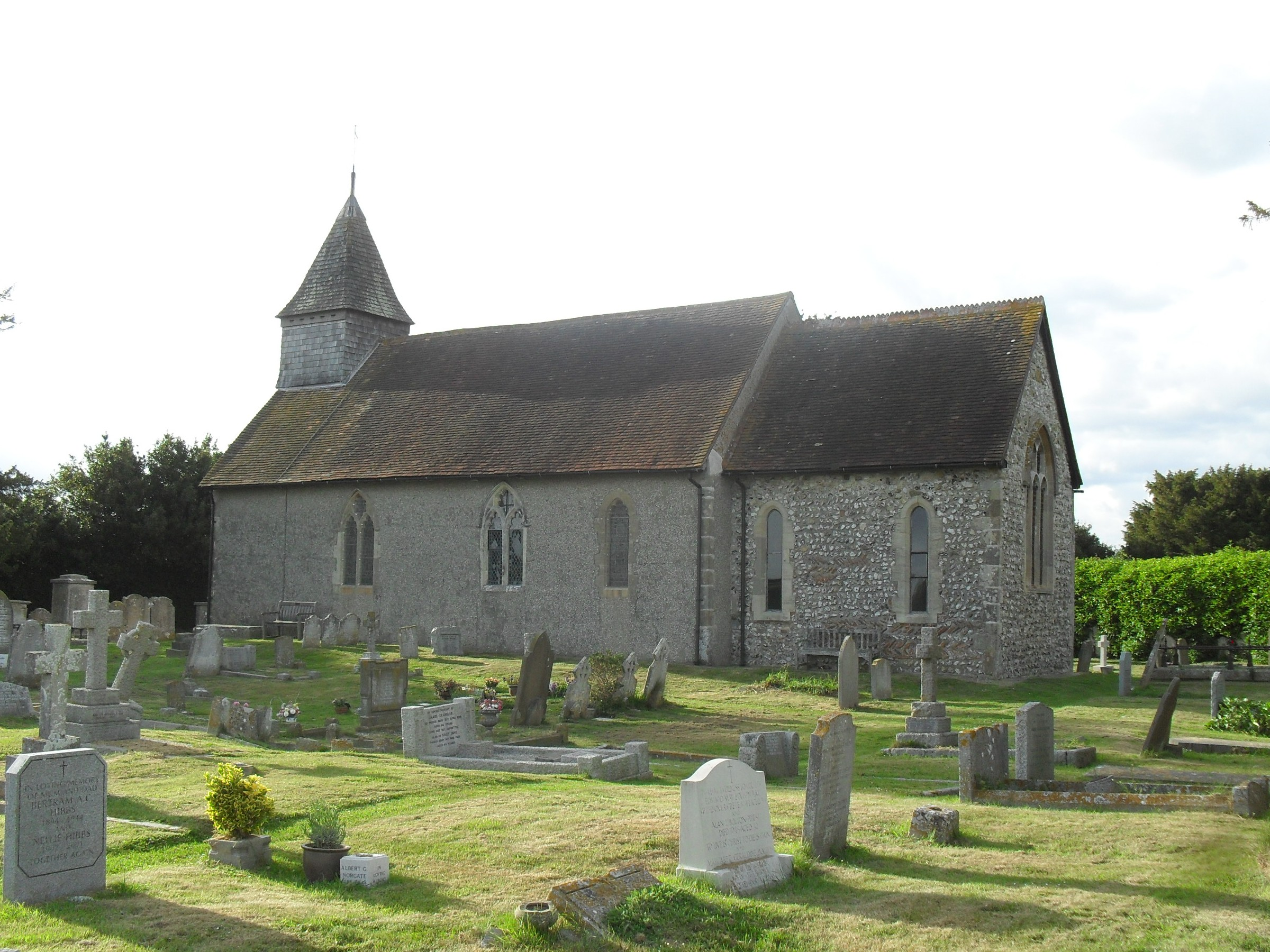
- St George's Church

- Location within West Sussex
- Area: 3.70 km^{2} (1.43 sq mi)
- Population: 3,107 2001 Census; 3,417 (2011 Census)
  - Density: 839/km^{2} (2,170/sq mi)
- OS grid reference: SU946055
  - London: 51 miles (82 km) NNE
- Civil parish: Barnham and Eastergate
- District: Arun
- Shire county: West Sussex
- Region: South East
- Country: England
- Sovereign state: United Kingdom
- Post town: CHICHESTER
- Postcode district: PO20
- Dialling code: 01243
- Police: Sussex
- Fire: West Sussex
- Ambulance: South East Coast
- UK Parliament: Arundel and South Downs

Eastergate is a village, ecclesiastical parish and former civil parish, now in the parish of Barnham and Eastergate, in the Arun district of West Sussex, England. It is located five miles (8 km) east of Chichester. In 2011 the parish had a population of 3417.

== History ==
Roman remains have been found near St George's Church, although until the 20th century the village remained a small one. The area, being on alluvium, was principally used for market gardens. Subsequent house building has resulted in a large increase in population.

As Gate, the settlement was listed in the 1086 Domesday Book as having 28 households, plough lands, woodlands, meadows and a church, with an annual value of £4.

John Ireland (1879–1962) often stayed in the parish, and named a hymn tune after it.

The Anglican parish in the late 19th century was 910 acres (370 ha) and had a population of about 100. The parish church of St George has Norman origins.

== Railway ==
Barnham railway station (which was actually within Eastergate parish) was opened in 1864 and lies on the West Coastway Line. The station was called Barnham Junction until 1929 because the branch line to Bognor Regis leaves the main line here. East and West Coastway (to Brighton in the East and Portsmouth or Southampton in the West) and London services are operated by Southern, with occasional First Great Western services travelling as far afield as Great Malvern and Cardiff.

== Demography and governance ==
The civil parish covered an area of 370 hectares (910 acres) (of which about half is farmed) and had a population of 3107 according to the 2001 census. At the 2011 Census the population was 3,417. On 1 April 2019 the parish was merged with Barnham to form "Barnham and Eastergate".
