= Vivian Kavanagh =

New Zealand cricketer

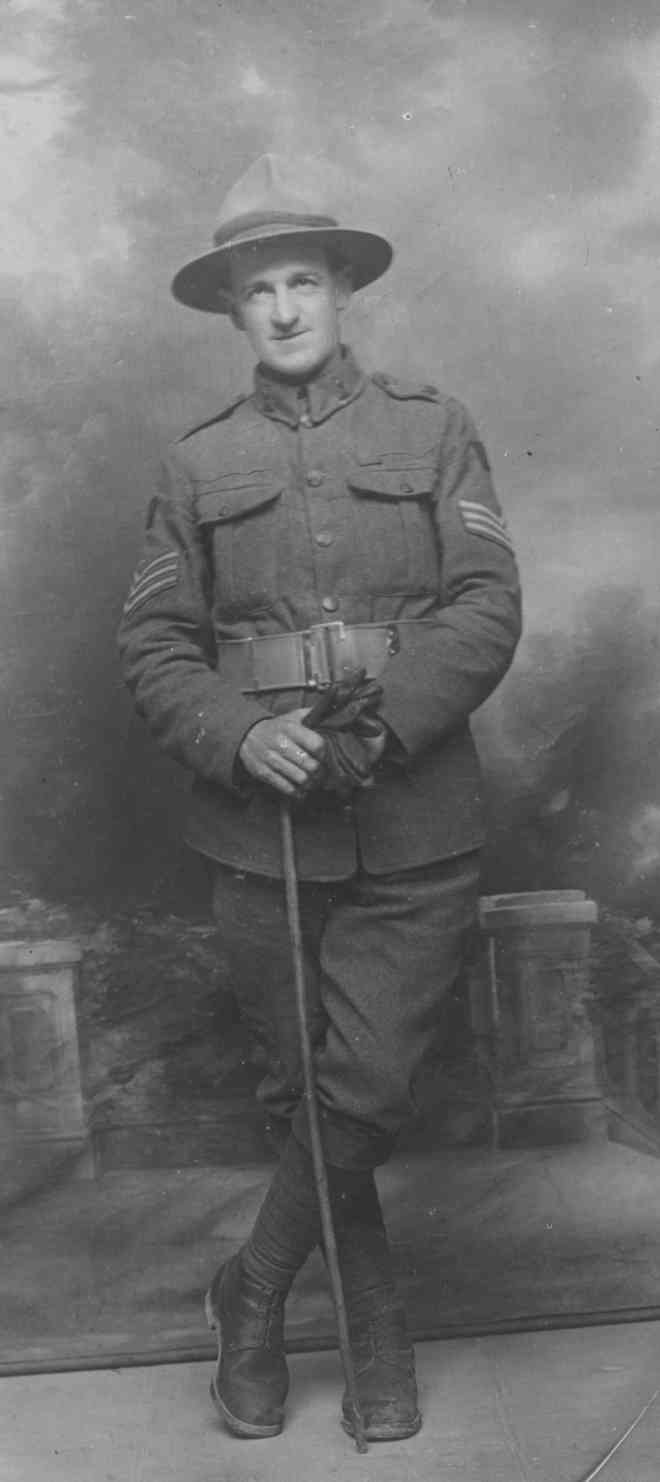
- Born: Vivian Claude Kavanagh; 2 June 1882; Auckland, New Zealand
- Died: 9 August 1917 (aged 35); Passchendaele salient, Belgium
- Military career
- Allegiance: New Zealand
- Branch: New Zealand Army
- Service years: 1899–1902; 1914–1917
- Service number: South Africa - 8770; WWI - 24/203
- Units: 2nd Boer War; Tenth Contingent, North Island Regiment (B Squadron); First World War; New Zealand Rifle Brigade (Earl of Liverpool's Own)

Vivian Claude Kavanagh (2 June 1882 – 9 August 1917) was a New Zealand cricketer and hockey player. He played one first-class match for Auckland in 1912/13. He was also a leading hockey player, who represented Auckland over many years as a half-back.

== Early life and pre-war career ==
A picture of the 1905 Auckland Hockey club team featuring Kavanagh (lying on side on the left)

Vivian Kavanagh was the youngest son of Charlotte and Charles Kavanagh. His father died the same year Vivian was born. Vivian had two older sisters, Marcella and Ida and two brothers Francis and Charles (Cecil). He lived in Grey Lynn with his mother and one of his sisters prior to the war. The Kavanagh family owned and ran the Mauku Store and Post Office and Vivian attended local schools in the area. When he returned home from the Second Boer War he took up study in architecture and started his own building and contracting business alongside T.H Williams. Vivian was a well known sportsman and he became one of Auckland's 'best representative hockey and cricket players'.

== Service History ==
Kavanagh's grave at Prowse Point

Kavanagh volunteered for service in the Second Boer War, at age 17. He served with the 10th contingent, and had worked his way up to lance corporal by the time the war ended in 1902.

When World War I broke out he enlisted to fight alongside his older brother Cecil. Vivian joined A Company of the New Zealand Rifle Brigade, (Earl of Liverpool's Own). He embarked from Wellington on the 9th of October 1915, and arrived in Cairo on the 14th of November. In January 1917 Vivian contracted trench fever and was admitted to a casualty clearing station on the 29th. Two weeks later he was transferred to a Convalescent Depot and eventually rejoined his unit. Kavanagh was shot and killed by a sniper on the Ypres Salient on 9 August 1917 during the battle of Passchendaele and is buried at Prowse Point Military Cemetery.

== See also ==
- List of Auckland representative cricketers
- List of cricketers who were killed during military service
