= Prowse Point Military Cemetery =

WWI CWGC cemetery in Belgium

Prowse Point Military Cememtery
- Commonwealth War Graves Commission
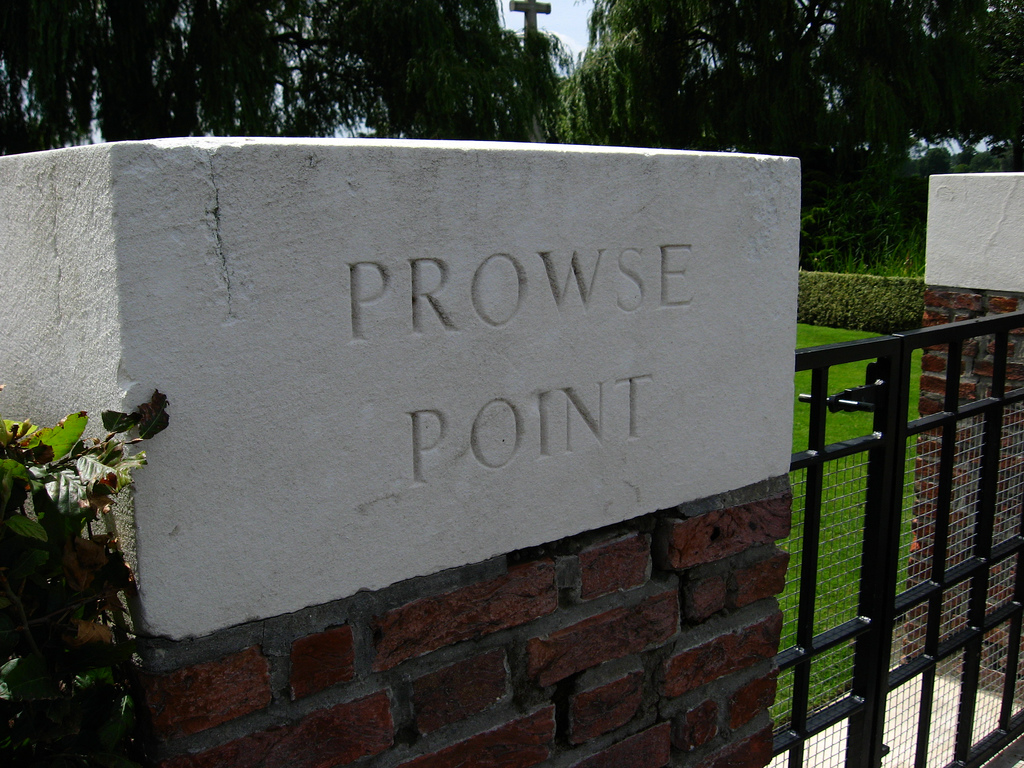
- Used for those deceased 1914-1918
- Established: 1914
- Location: 50°44′38″N 02°53′55″E near Ypres, West Flanders, Belgium
- Designed by: W H Cowlishaw
- Total burials: 233
- Unknowns: 1

Burials by nation
- Allied Powers: United Kingdom: 165; Canada: 1; Australia: 13; New Zealand: 42; Central Powers: Germany: 12

Burials by war
- World War I: 233

UNESCO World Heritage Site
- Official name: Funerary and memory sites of the First World War (Western Front)
- Type: Cultural
- Criteria: i, ii, vi
- Designated: 2023 (45th session)
- Reference no.: 1567-WA12

Prowse Point Military Cemetery is a Commonwealth War Graves Commission (CWGC) burial ground for the dead of the First World War located in the Ypres Salient on the Western Front in Belgium.

The cemetery grounds were assigned to the United Kingdom in perpetuity by King Albert I of Belgium in recognition of the sacrifices made by the British Empire in the defence and liberation of Belgium during the war.

== Foundation ==
The cemetery is on the site of a stand made by the 1st Battalions of the Hampshire Regiment and Somerset Light Infantry in October 1914. Major (later Brigadier-General) Charles Bertie Prowse displayed heroism at this stand and the site (and thus cemetery) was named after him. This makes the cemetery unique on the Salient for being named after an individual.

The cemetery was begun in November 1914 and continued to be used until fighting moved beyond the Ploegsteert area in April 1918.

The cemetery was designed by W H Cowlishaw.

Notable graves include Sergeant W A Connor of the Royal Berkshire Regiment, who was awarded the French Croix de Guerre and Vivian Kavanagh, a New Zealand first class cricketer and regional representative hockey player of the New Zealand Rifle Brigade (Earl of Liverpool's Own) who was killed on August 9th 1917.

== Later burials ==
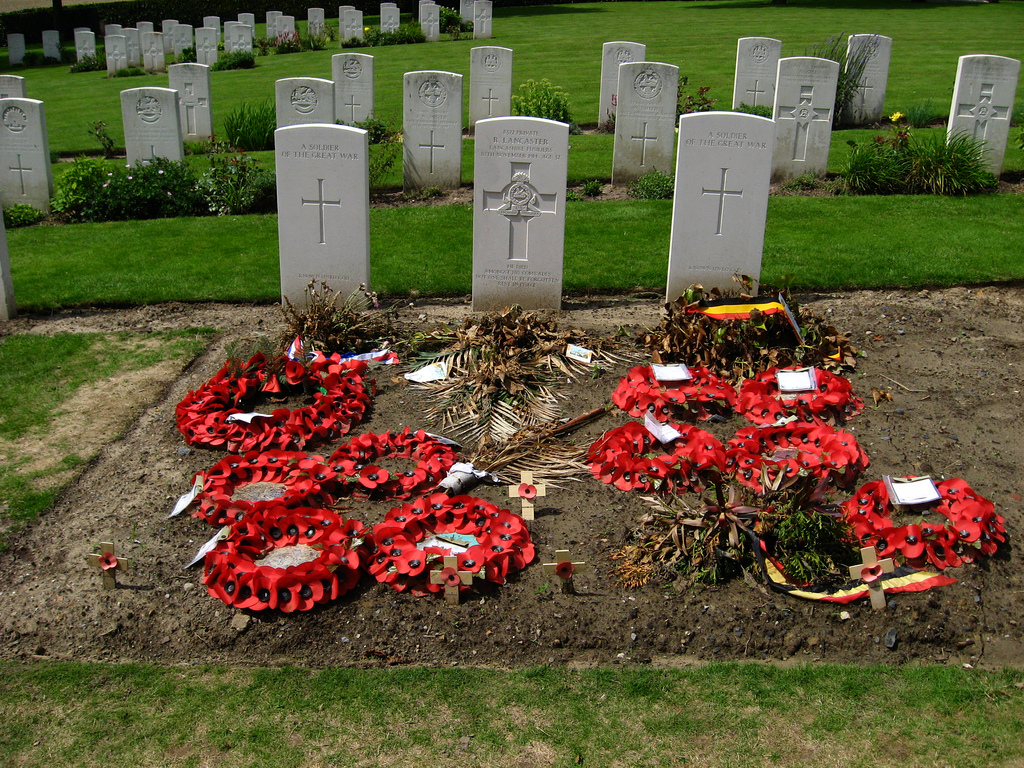
Private Richard Lancaster's grave flanked by two unknowns, three weeks after being interred at Prowse Point

This site featured heavy fighting at numerous points in the war. As such, remains of combatants are still occasionally being discovered in the area. Private Harry Wilkinson of the Lancashire Fusiliers was originally listed on the Ploegsteert Memorial to the Missing but his body was recovered and buried here in 2001.

More recently, the remains of Private Richard Lancaster of the Lancashire Fusiliers, plus two others unidentified, were found and were buried at Prowse Point with full military honours. The ceremony was attended by his granddaughter.
