= Aldingbourne House =

House in Arun, West Sussex, UK

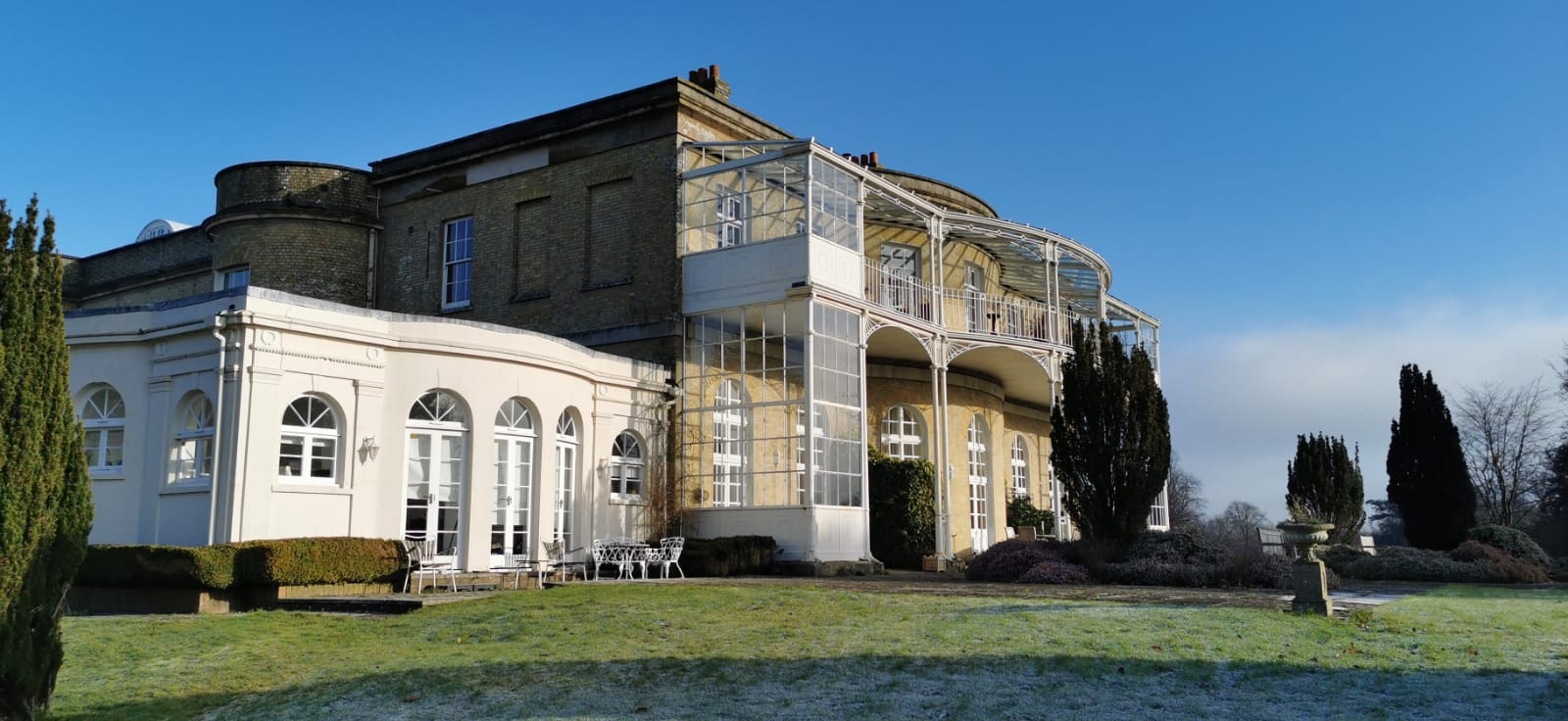
- A view of the south side of Aldingbourne House, showing the Edwardian cast iron veranda and the Orangerie

- Location within West Sussex
- 50°51′N 0°40′W
- Location: Aldingbourne
- OS grid reference: SU 92787 07233

History
- Built: 1799

Site notes
- Area: West Sussex
- Architect: unknown
- Architectural style: Georgian
- Owner: private

Listed Building – Grade II
- Official name: Aldingbourne House
- Designated: 20 September 1984
- Reference no.: 1027737

Aldingbourne House is a Regency Era Grade II listed country house near the village of Aldingbourne in the Arun district of West Sussex. It was built in 1799, with later alterations and additions.

== History ==
The house was commissioned shortly before 1799 by a wealthy Portsmouth merchant, Miles Rowe, who originated from the close by locality of Norton. The exterior appearance, a white brick facade of two storeys of seven bays with advanced sides, was pretty common at the time, and other details of the project may lead to believe that nearby Goodwood House owned by the Dukes of Richmond could have been an inspiration. Initially, the house was known as Norton Place.

In 1814, the property was sold to Henry Molyneux-Howard, the younger brother of Bernard Howard, who would shortly become the 12th Duke of Norfolk and inherit Arundel Castle. Henry Howard expanded the original building, adding the Orangerie on the South side, as well as the extension on the North side. After his death in 1824, the property passed to his widow Lady Molyneux Howard, who sold it in 1834 to Richard Hasler from Kirdford (near Chichester), who was a local wealthy landowner with extensive possessions in the area. Richard Hasler enjoyed it until his death in 1835 and then passed it to his son Richard (son-in-law of William Frederick Wyndham and brother-in-law of the 4th Earl of Egremont), who upon his own death in 1866 left the estate to his son William Wyndham Hasler.

The house remained in the Hasler family until the death of William Wyndham Hasler in 1905, when it was sold to a Mrs Kincaid Smith, and from her it passed to her son Major Kenneth Kincaid-Smith, RA DSO who owned it still in 1911 but left it unoccupied. Probably rented, it was occupied by William John Beattie-Seaman, father of the Grand-Prix driver Richard Seaman who was born there in February 1913. During WWI, the Seamans decided that the house was too close to the coast and to Portsmouth naval base and moved away to Kentwell Hall in 1915. In 1915 the house is still recorded as in the property of the trustees of the "late" Major Kincaid-Smith, who had probably died during the war.

After the war the house was sold, like many other English country houses of this time, and on 21 June 1921 Aldingbourne House became the property of West Sussex County Council, partly for small-holding purposes, and partly as a tuberculosis sanatorium with a capacity of 61 adult beds plus 9 for children. After a brief spell during WWII when the building hosted Canadian troops, it was passed to the Government in 1948 along with the assets of many independent sanatoriums and incorporated into the NHS. In 1973 it was one of the satellite units of the Manor Hospital, Epsom, as a 60-bed unit where patients could be sent for seaside holidays.

The building remained a care facility until 1994, when it was alienated and work started for its conversion into a residential development, partitioning the building into 19 flats. Some minor restoration works were carried out in the subsequent years, as late as 2014, when the double-storey cast-iron veranda was restored and re-glazed at the cost of £75,000.
