= Equipment support =

Type of military terminology

Equipment Support, sometimes abbreviated as ES, is a term used to describe maintenance and supply duties of certain military regiments in the West. The term is also occasionally described as 'materiel', however this term usually refers to the supply of equipment, rather than the actual practice of providing support for certain items.

== Uses ==
=== United Kingdom ===
In the British Army, the term is used to describe those units and duties where maintenance units provide support to certain vehicles and equipment. In addition, the term is sometimes used in the following terms "... responsible for maintenance and repairing the Army's equipment'.

Under British Army doctrine, equipment support is defined as follows:

Equipment support seeks to keep the required quantity of operational equipment available to the force. This is achieved by the active management and maintenance of equipment and equipment components. Maintenance is organised into four levels which are determined by the complexity and engineering requirements of the task.

== See also ==
- Military logistics
- Military acquisition
- Military supply-chain management
