= Aldingbourne =

Village and parish in West Sussex, England

Coordinates: 50.8413°N 0.6897°W

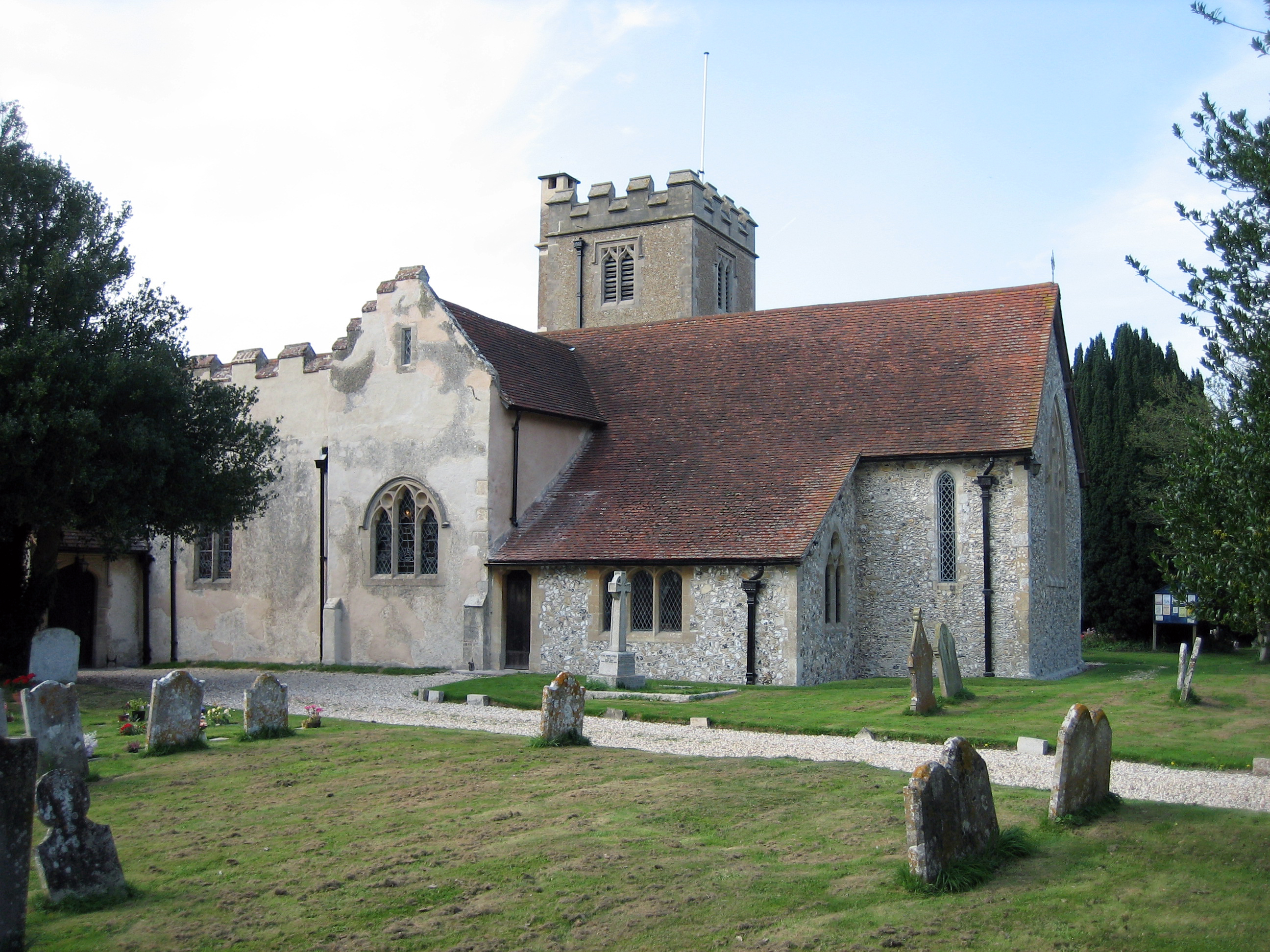
- Church of St Mary

- Location within West Sussex
- Area: 12.53 km^{2} (4.84 sq mi)
- Population: 4,443 (Civil Parish.2021)
  - Density: 355/km^{2} (920/sq mi)
- OS grid reference: SU923054
  - London: 52 miles (84 km) NNE
- Civil parish: Aldingbourne
- District: Arun
- Shire county: West Sussex
- Region: South East
- Country: England
- Sovereign state: United Kingdom
- Post town: CHICHESTER
- Postcode district: PO20
- Dialling code: 01243
- Police: Sussex
- Fire: West Sussex
- Ambulance: South East Coast
- UK Parliament: Arundel and South Downs

Aldingbourne is a village, Anglican parish and civil parish in the Arun District of West Sussex, England. Its centre is 4 miles (6.4 km) north of Bognor Regis and 4 miles (6.4 km) east of Chichester with the A29 and A27 main roads running through it.

The civil parish is named for the small village of Aldingbourne, but most of the population is in Westergate, and the smaller settlements of Norton, Nyton, Woodgate, Lidsey and part of Shripney. The ecclesiastical parish extends to 3,060 acres (1,240 ha), and was a significant settlement at the time of the Domesday Survey of 1086.

== Geography ==
The developed south and east of the parish is on fertile soil 7–15 metres above sea level, whereas north of the A27 road at the foot of the South Downs National Park the land reaches 37 metres in altitude. Eartham is the neighbouring parish to the north.

== History ==
First documented in 683 AD as Aldingburne, then 200 years later as Ealdingburnan, the name describes a stream or bourne (now known as Aldingbourne Rife) belonging to Ealda, a Saxon settler. Aldingeborne is described in the Domesday Book of 1086 as having 69 households (28 villagers, 38 smallholders and three slaves), a value to the lord of the manor of £18 and in the largest 20 per cent of settlements recorded in the survey; as well as agricultural holdings and resources, the church was listed, and the tenant in chief was the bishop of Chichester. It was in the Hundred of Boxgrove.

In 1861 the parish extended to 3,060 acres (1,240 ha) and had a population of 772. The population in 2011 was 3,819, and had increased to 4,443 by 2021.

== Parish church ==
The ancient Grade-I-listed Anglican parish church is dedicated to St Mary the Virgin. According to Sussex Notes and Queries, the history of the church building "is not clear". Different parts of the church date from both the twelfth and thirteenth century, with the chancel having been built in the thirteenth century. Later additions include a porch dating from the seventeenth century and an organ chamber that was "wholly modern" in 1944.

== Economy and locality ==
Agriculture occupies most of the land use and is a major employer. Other key industries include food and hospitality, general retail, the public sector, care, science and automotive-related careers. In the parish is Fontwell Park Racecourse, a venue in horse racing which has a compact figure-of-eight chase course and an oval hurdles course. Nearby Denmans Garden, a Royal Horticultural Society partner garden open to the public, features some exotic and unusual plants.

There are 33 listed buildings in the parish, including the Regency-period Aldingbourne House. The Prince of Wales pub is beside the A29 at Woodgate.

== Education ==
Ormiston Six Villages Academy (OSVA) is the main secondary school for the parish and surrounding area. It opened in 2013 and was formerly called Westergate Community School. Aldingbourne Primary School is on Westergate Street.

== Notable people ==
Lord Henry Howard-Molyneux-Howard owned Aldingbourne House in the 19th century and racing driver Dick Seaman was born there in 1913.
