= Hastie =

Hastie is both a surname and a given name. Notable people with the name include:

== Surname ==
- Alex Hastie (1935–2010), Scottish rugby union player
- Andrew Hastie (field hockey) (born 1970), New Zealand field hockey player
- Andrew Hastie (politician) (born 1982), Australian Member of Parliament
- Archibald Hastie (20th century), Scottish footballer
- Harry Hastie (fl. 1919–1920), English footballer
- Ian Hastie (footballer) (1887– after 1911), English footballer
- Iain Hastie (fl. 1971–2), New Zealand footballer
- Jake Hastie (born 1999), Scottish footballer
- Jennifer Hastie, British laser scientist
- Jim / James Hastie (disambiguation), multiple people
- John Hastie, multiple people
- Karen Hastie Williams (born 1944), American lawyer and company director
- Trevor Hastie (born 1953), American statistician
- William H. Hastie (1904-1976), first African-American federal judge, federal appellate judge and Governor of the U.S. Virgin Islands
- Willie Hastie (born 1924), Scottish footballer

== Given name ==
- Thomas Hastie Bell (1867-1942), Scottish anarchist

== Fictional characters ==
- Hastie Lanyon, a fictional character in Strange Case of Dr Jekyll and Mr Hyde

== See also ==
- Hasty (disambiguation)
