= Hasty =

Hasty may refer to:

- Hasty, Arkansas, United States
- Hasty, Colorado, United States
- HMS Hasty (1894), a Charger class destroyer
- HMS Hasty (H24), an H-class destroyer
- Hasty (racehorse), an unconsidered competitor who finished fifth in the 1840 Grand National

== People with the surname ==
- James Hasty (born 1965), American football cornerback
- JaMycal Hasty (born 1996), American football player
- Jimmy Hasty (born 1936), Northern Irish footballer
- Stanley Hasty (born 1920), American clarinetist

== See also ==
- Haste (disambiguation)
- Hastie
- Hasty attack
- Hasty pudding
