= James Hastie =

James Hastie may refer to:

- James Hastie (rower) (1848–1897), British rower
- James Hastie (footballer) (1892–1914), Scottish footballer

== See also ==
- Jim Hastie (1920–1996), Scottish cricketer
- Jim Hastie (footballer) (born 1949), Scottish footballer
