= Hasted =

Hasted is a surname. Notable people with the surname include:

- Edward Hasted (1732–1812), English antiquarian
- John Hasted (1921–2002), British physicist and folk musician
- Michael Hasted (born 1945), British artist, photographer, writer and theatre director
- Sarah Hasted, American curator

== See also ==
- Haste (disambiguation)
