= James Buchanan, 1st Baron Woolavington =

British businessman and philanthropist

The Right Honourable The Lord Woolavington GCVO JP
- Buchanan in 1900

Chairman, Buchanan's
- In office 1884 – 9 August 1935

Personal details
- Born: James Buchanan; 16 August 1849 Brockville, Province of Canada
- Died: 9 August 1935 (aged 85) Lavington Park, East Lavington, Sussex, England

James Buchanan, 1st Baron Woolavington, GCVO, JP (16 August 1849 – 9 August 1935), known as Sir James Buchanan, Bt, from 1920 to 1922, was a British businessman, philanthropist, and racehorse owner and breeder.

== Early life ==
Buchanan was born in Brockville, Province of Canada, the third and youngest son of Alexander Buchanan and his wife Catherine (née McLean), Scottish immigrants, but his parents returned to the United Kingdom shortly after he was born and he was brought up in Larne, where his father worked as a quarry manager. Due to ill health as a child, he was educated privately.

== Business career ==
Buchanan joined William Sloan & Co, a Glasgow shipping firm, as an office boy when he was fourteen or fifteen, and was later promoted to be a clerk. In 1868, he joined his brother William in his grain business, also in Glasgow. In November 1879, he moved to London as an agent for the Leith whisky blenders Charles Mackinlay & Co.

He realised that there was an untapped market in England for bottled Scotch whisky and set about producing his own, the Buchanan Blend, which is still available today. He went into business on his own in 1884. Buchanan did not, however, produce his own whisky. It was produced for him by the Glasgow blenders W. P. Lowrie & Co. Marketed in distinctive black bottles with plain white labels, it was commonly known as "black and white whisky", a name that was eventually actually used on the label. By 1903, when his firm was incorporated as a private limited company, Buchanan was worth £750,000. By 1909, Buchanans was the best-selling Scotch in England. He supplied whisky to the House of Commons from 1885. In 1898, he received Royal Warrants to supply Queen Victoria, the Prince of Wales, and the Duke of York. Buchanan opened a Paris office in 1902 and a New York office shortly afterwards. In 1898 he opened Glentauchers malt whisky distillery on Speyside and later acquired two more distilleries. In 1906, he bought Lowrie's and rapidly mechanised their production facilities in Glasgow. In 1907, he acquired an interest in the North British Bottle Manufacturing Company and purchased the Acme Tea Chest Company, both to aid his business. Both were rapidly mechanised. He was a master of publicity, driving a red-wheeled buggy pulled by a black pony and accompanied by a liveried footman.

In 1909, Buchanan proposed a merger between the "big three" whisky firms: Buchanan's, Dewar's, and Walker's. This, however, was not successful. He tried again in 1914, and in April 1915 Buchanan's and Dewar's formed a joint holding company, Scotch Whisky Brands Ltd, renamed Buchanan Dewar Ltd in 1919. In 1925, the "big three" merged with the Distillers Company. Buchanan was a director, but his age and failing health (he had never been in the best of health) meant he played little part in the company, attending only a single board meeting.

== Other interests ==
Buchanan was vice-president of the Tariff Reform League. He owned properties in Kenya and Argentina and part-owned, with Lord Aberdeen, a 20,000-acre fruit farm in British Columbia, Canada. His Highland seat was the Torridon estate in Wester Ross, bought after the death of Duncan Darroch in 1910, advertised for sale in 1922 and sold in 1924 to the Canadian industrialist Sir Charles Gordon. He was appointed High Sheriff of Sussex in 1910.

=== Philanthropy ===
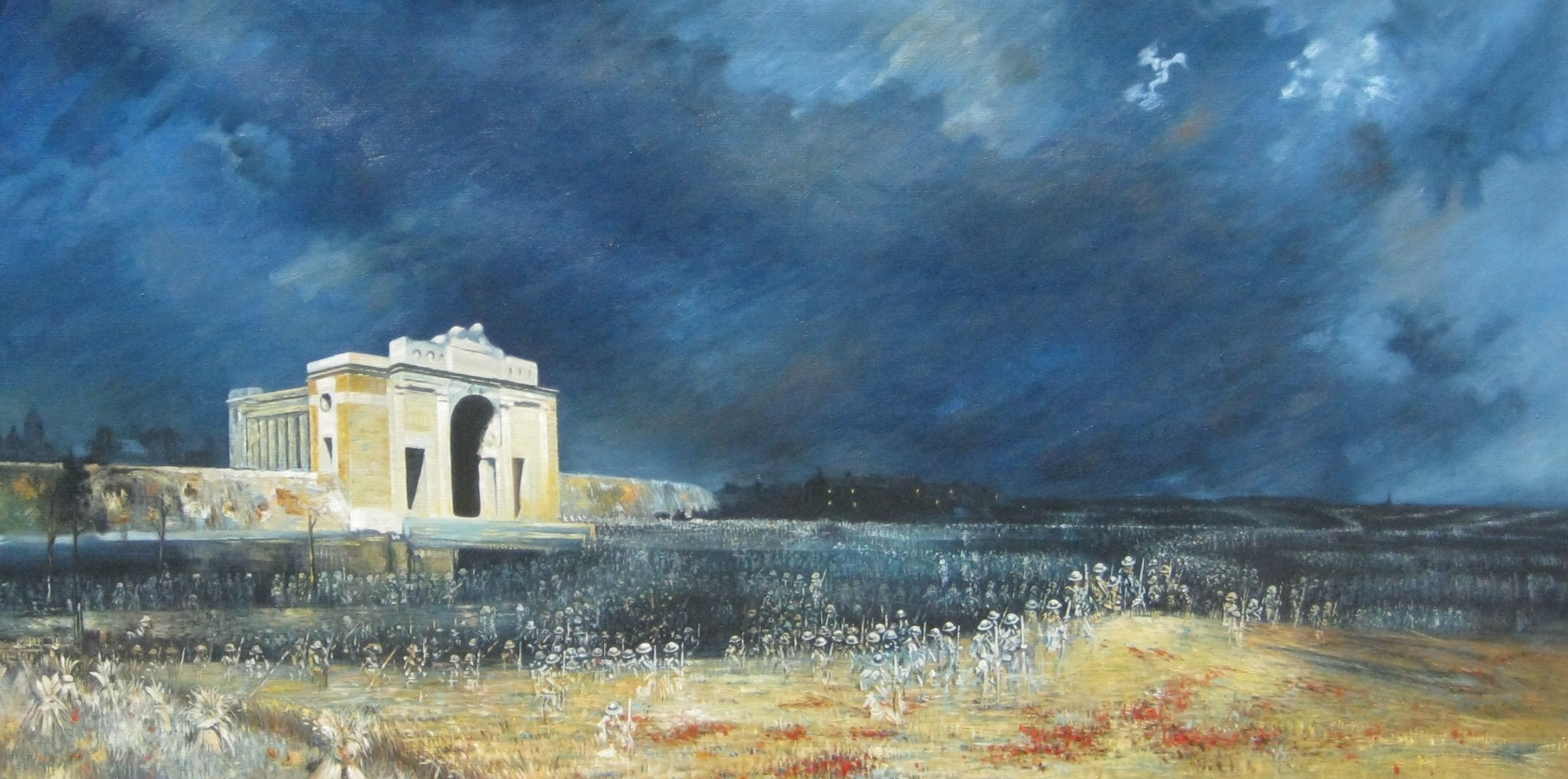
Menin Gate at Midnight by Will Longstaff at the Australian War Memorial donated by Woolavington to the Australian Government

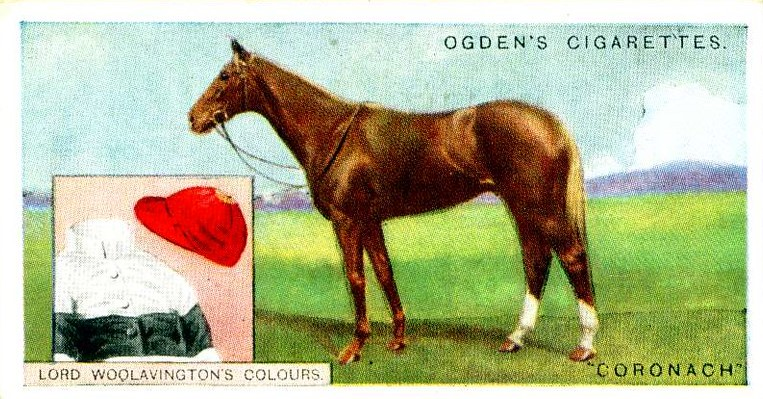
Ogden's cigarette card depicting Coronach and Lord Woolavington's racing colours from 1926

He spent much of his wealth on philanthropic projects. He bought the logbook of HMS Victory and presented it to the British Museum, financed the fitting out of HMS Implacable as a training ship, and donated £125,000 to fund a wing at Middlesex Hospital in 1928 in honour of his late wife, £50,000 to restore the nave of St George's Chapel, Windsor, £10,000 to the University of Edinburgh to fund animal breeding research (later receiving an honorary Doctorate of Laws), £10,000 to fund a ward at the London Hospital, £5,000 to the West of Scotland Agricultural College, £2,500 to the Licensed Victuallers' School, and £2,500 to the Licensed Victuallers' Benevolent Institution. In 1928 Woolavington purchased the Will Longstaff painting Menin Gate at Midnight for 20,000 Guineas (equivalent to £21,000) and presented it to the Australian Government. It was then being displayed in the United Kingdom and Australia before becoming a core part of the Australian War Memorial collection.

=== Thoroughbred racing ===
For more than two decades, Woolavington was a significant owner/breeder in the sport of Thoroughbred horse racing who twice won The Derby and St. Leger Stakes. Among his best known runners were Epsom Lad, Hurry On, who became the foundation sire for his stud, Captain Cuttle, Coronach, Press Gang, and Coventry Stakes winner Manitoba who went on to become the leading sire in Australia in 1944 and 1945. He set up a stud farm at his Sussex estate, Lavington Park, East Lavington, which he had bought in 1903. He was elected to the Jockey Club in 1927. He also bred pedigree cattle and sheep.

== Honours ==
Buchanan was created a baronet, of Lavington in the County of Sussex, in the 1920 New Year Honours, for "public and local services" and was raised to the peerage in the 1922 New Year Honours as Baron Woolavington, of Lavington, in the County of Sussex, for being a "generous supporter of many public and charitable objects". However, it is said that he paid £50,000 for his peerage, signing the cheque "Woolavington" and dating it 2 January – the day after the title was to be gazetted – so that the payment would bounce if he did not receive the honour he had been promised. He was appointed Knight Grand Cross of the Royal Victorian Order (GCVO) in the 1931 New Year Honours.

== Family and personal life ==
On 5 December 1891, Buchanan married a young widow thirteen years his junior, Annie Eliza Bardolph (née Pounder). Annie already had a son and a daughter; together the couple had a daughter, the Honourable Catherine Buchanan, and a son who died in infancy. Annie was a nurse and worked in London hospitals during the First World War.

In 1903, Woolavington bought the manor of Graffham from the Wilberforce family, and built a village hall.

Lady Woolavington died suddenly in October 1918.

The peerage and baronetcy became extinct on Woolavington's death at Lavington Park in August 1935, aged 85. He left an estate worth over £7 million and was buried in the nearby churchyard of Graffham. The manor of Graffham was bought by Euan Wallace MP.

== Footnotes ==
Peerage of the United Kingdom
New creation	Baron Woolavington; 1922–1935	Extinct
Baronetage of the United Kingdom
New creation	Baronet (of Lavington); 1920–1935	Extinct
