= Menin Gate =

World War I memorial in Ypres, Belgium

Menin Gate Memorial to the Missing
- Commonwealth War Graves Commission
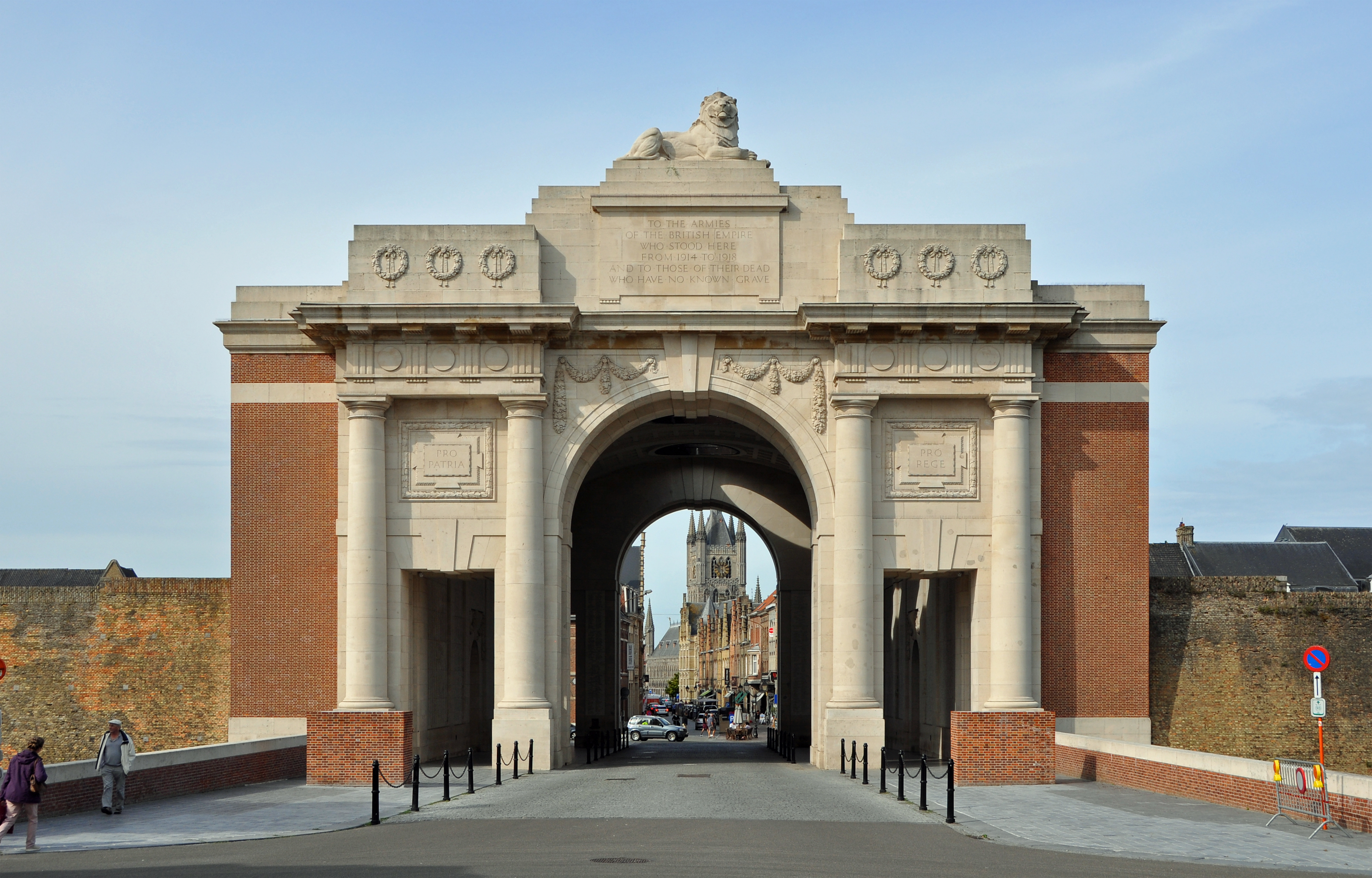
- The Menin Gate
- For the missing of Commonwealth nations (except New Zealand and Newfoundland) who died in the Ypres Salient during the First World War.
- Unveiled: 24 July 1927
- Location: 50°51′08″N 02°53′30″E near Ypres, West Flanders, Belgium
- Designed by: Reginald Blomfield
- Commemorated: 54,896

Burials by nation
- Commonwealth nations: United Kingdom: 40,244; Canada: 6,983; Australia: 6,198; South Africa: 564; British India: 414; British West Indies: 6

Burials by war
- World War I: 54,896
- To the armies of the British Empire who stood here from 1914 to 1918 and to those of their dead who have no known grave

UNESCO World Heritage Site
- Official name: Funerary and memory sites of the First World War (Western Front)
- Type: Cultural
- Criteria: i, ii, vi
- Designated: 2023 (45th session)
- Reference no.: 1567-FL17

The Menin Gate (Dutch: Menenpoort), officially the Menin Gate Memorial to the Missing, (Note: "Menin" is the traditional name of the gate in this location of Ypres' city walls because it leads to the town of Menen.) is a war memorial in Ypres, Belgium, dedicated to the British and Commonwealth soldiers who were killed in the Ypres Salient of World War I and whose graves are unknown. The memorial is located at the eastern exit of the town and marks the starting point for one of the main roads that led Allied soldiers to the front line.

Designed by Sir Reginald Blomfield and built by the Imperial War Graves Commission, since renamed the Commonwealth War Graves Commission, the Menin Gate Memorial was unveiled on 24 July 1927. In early 2023, the monument was closed for extensive restoration works. The work was completed in Spring 2025.

== Background ==
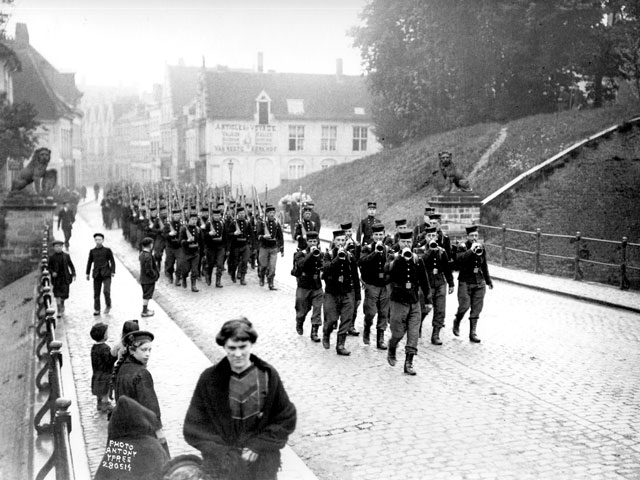
Menenpoort on 28 May 1914, before World War I. The two lion statues are visible.

In medieval times, the original narrow gateway on the eastern wall of Ypres was called the Hangoartpoort, "poort" being the Dutch word for gate. During the 17th and 18th centuries, while under the occupation of the Habsburgs and the French, the city was increasingly fortified. Major works were completed at the end of the 17th century by the French military engineer Sebastien Le Prestre, Seigneur de Vauban.

At the outbreak of the First World War in August 1914, the eastern exit simply cut through the remains of the ramparts and crossed a moat. The gateway was by this time known as the Menenpoort, or Menin Gate in English, because the road leading through the gateway led to the small town of Menen.

Ypres occupied a strategic position during the First World War because it stood in the path of Germany's planned sweep across the rest of Belgium, as had been called for in the Schlieffen Plan. By October 1914, the much battered Belgian Army broke the dykes on the Yser River to the north of the city to keep the western tip of Belgium out of German hands.

Ypres, being the centre of a road network, anchored one end of this defensive feature and was also essential for the Germans if they wanted to take the Channel Ports through which British support was flooding into France. For the Allies, Ypres was also important because it eventually became the last major Belgian town that was not under German control.

The importance of the town is reflected in the five major battles that occurred around it during the war. During the First Battle of Ypres the Allies halted the German Army's advance to the east of the city. The German army eventually surrounded the city on three sides, bombarding it throughout much of the war. The Second Battle of Ypres marked a second German attempt to take the city in April 1915. The third battle is more commonly referred to as Passchendaele, but this 1917 battle was a complex five-month engagement. The fourth and fifth battles occurred during 1918.

British and Commonwealth soldiers often passed through the Menenpoort on their way to the front lines, with some 300,000 of them being killed in the Ypres Salient. 90,000 of these soldiers have no known graves.

From September to November 1915, the British 177th Tunnelling Company built tunnelled dugouts in the city ramparts near the Menin Gate. These were the first British tunnelled dugouts in the Ypres Salient.

The carved limestone lions adorning the original gate were damaged by shellfire and were donated to the Australian War Memorial by the mayor of Ypres in 1936. They were restored in 1987, and reside at the entrance to that memorial, so that all visitors to the memorial pass between them. Replicas of the original Menin gate lions now sit at the entrance of the original gate in Ypres, a gift by the Australian government in recognition of the 100th anniversary of Australians serving in Flanders during the First World War.

== Memorial ==
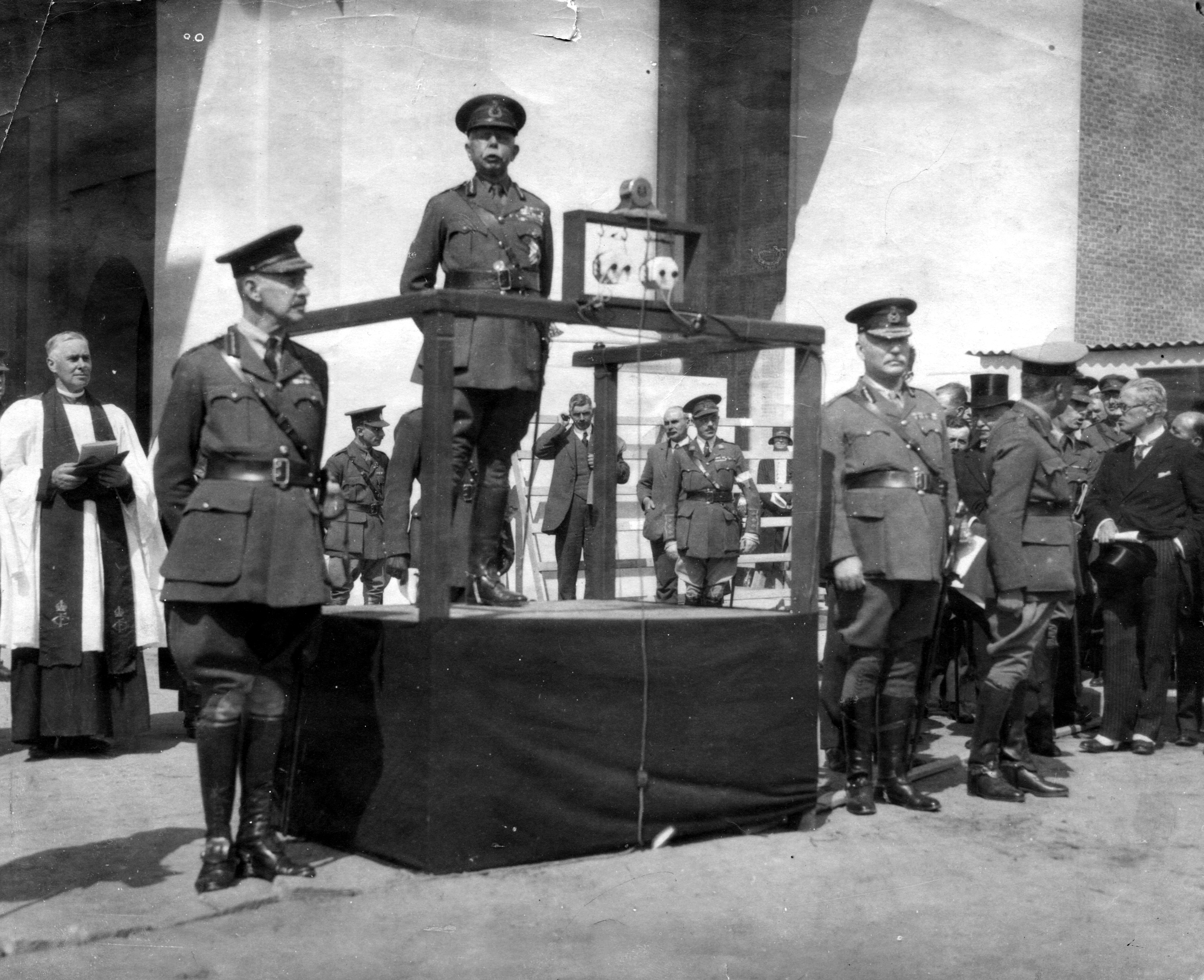
The 1924 unveiling of the memorial by Field Marshal Herbert Plumer

Reginald Blomfield's triumphal arch, designed in 1921, is the entry to the barrel-vaulted passage for traffic through the mausoleum that honours the Missing, who have no known graves. The patient lion on the top is the lion of Britain but also the lion of Flanders. It was chosen to be a memorial as it was the closest gate of the town to the fighting, and so Allied Troops would have marched past it on their way to fight. Most troops passed out of the other gates of Ypres, as the Menin Gate was too dangerous due to shellfire.

Its large Hall of Memory contains names on stone panels of 54,395 Commonwealth soldiers who died in the Salient but whose bodies have never been identified or found. On completion of the memorial, it was discovered to be too small to contain all the names as originally planned. An arbitrary cut-off point of 15 August 1917 was chosen and the names of 34,984 UK missing after this date were inscribed on the Tyne Cot Memorial to the Missing instead. The Menin Gate Memorial does not list the names of the missing of New Zealand and Newfoundland soldiers, who are instead honoured on separate memorials.

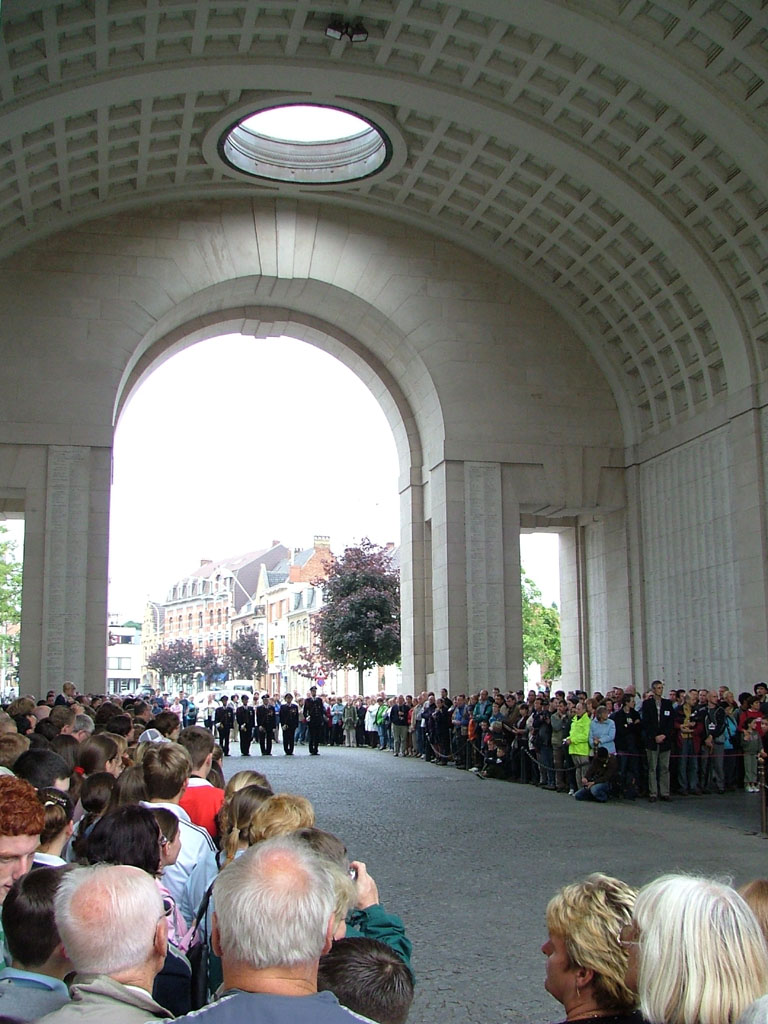
The interior of the Menin Gate

The inscription inside the archway is similar to the one at Tyne Cot, with the addition of a prefatory Latin phrase: "Ad Majorem Dei Gloriam, a centuries-old traditional text meaning 'To the greater glory of God'. – Here are recorded names of officers and men who fell in Ypres Salient, but to whom the fortune of war denied the known and honoured burial given to their comrades in death". This inscription, proposed by Rudyard Kipling, is matched by the main overhead inscription on both the east- and west-facing façades of the arch, which he personally composed.

On the opposite side of the archway to that inscription is the shorter dedication: "They shall receive a crown of glory that fadeth not away". There are Latin inscriptions set in circular panels either side of the archway, on both the east and west sides: Pro Patria and Pro Rege ('For Country' and 'For King'). A French inscription mentions the citizens of Ypres: "Érigé par les nations de l'Empire Britannique en l'honneur de leurs morts ce monument est offert aux citoyens d'Ypres pour l'ornement de leur cité et en commémoration des jours où l'Armée Britannique l'a défendue contre l'envahisseur", which translates into English as: "Erected by the nations of the British Empire in honour of their dead, this monument is offered to the citizens of Ypres for the ornament of their city and in commemoration of the days where the British Army defended it against the invader."

Reaction to the Menin Gate, the first of the Imperial (now Commonwealth) War Graves Commission's Memorials to the Missing, ranged from its condemnation by the war poet Siegfried Sassoon, to praise by the Austrian writer Stefan Zweig. Sassoon described the Menin Gate in his poem 'On Passing the New Menin Gate', saying that the dead of the Ypres Salient would "deride this sepulchre of crime". Zweig, in contrast, praised the simplicity of the memorial, and lack of overt triumphalism, and said that it was "more impressive than any triumphal arch or monument to victory that I have ever seen". Blomfield himself said that this work of his was one of three that he wanted to be remembered by.

To this day, the remains of missing soldiers are found from time to time in the countryside around the town of Ypres. Typically, such finds are made during building work or road-mending activities. Any human remains discovered receive a proper burial in one of the war cemeteries in the region. If the remains can be identified, the relevant name is removed from the Menin Gate.

== Notable commemoratees ==
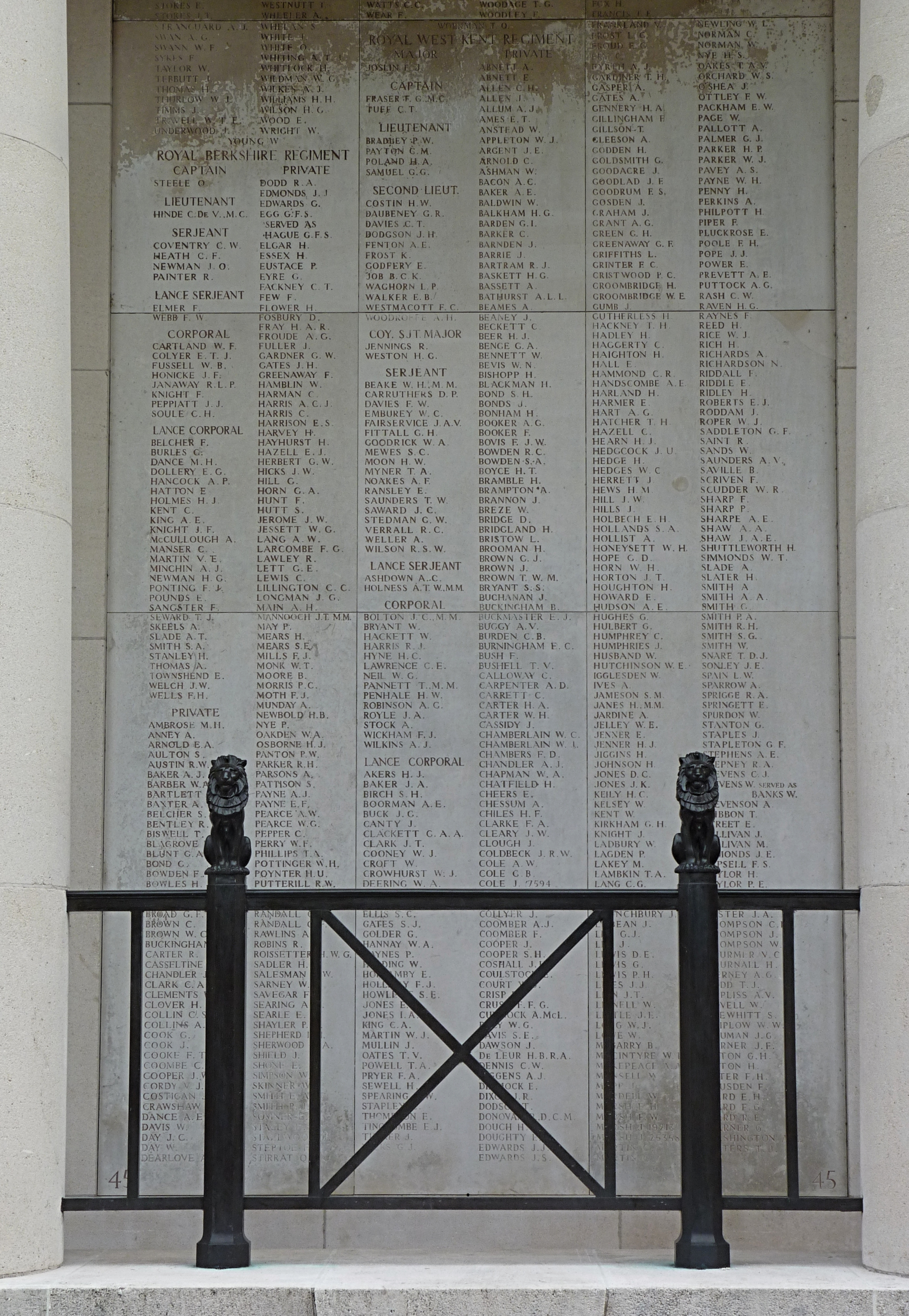
One of the panels of names of the missing dead

Eight recipients of the Victoria Cross are commemorated on this memorial, listed under their respective regiments:

- Lance Corporal Frederick Fisher VC (Irish-Canadian)
- Brigadier-General Charles FitzClarence VC (highest ranking commemorated)
- Company Sergeant Major Frederick William Hall VC (Canadian)
- Second Lieutenant Denis George Wyldbore Hewitt VC
- Lieutenant Hugh McKenzie VC (Canadian)
- Captain John Vallentin VC
- Private Edward Warner VC
- Second Lieutenant Sidney Woodroffe VC

Others listed include:

- Lieutenant George Archer-Shee, original for the title character in Terence Rattigan's play The Winslow Boy
- Lieutenant Aidan Chavasse, brother of Captain Noel Chavasse VC and Bar.
- Second Lieutenant Harold Bache, English first-class cricketer
- Sergeant Harry Band, reputed victim of the alleged "Crucified Canadian" atrocity
- Captain Percy Banks, English first-class cricketer
- Captain Frank Bingham, English first-class cricketer
- Second Lieutenant William (Billy) Geen, Wales rugby international
- Private James Hastie, Scottish footballer
- Lieutenant Walter Lyon, poet
- Captain Basil Maclear, Ireland rugby international
- Lieutenant Colonel Edgar Mobbs, England rugby international
- Captain The Hon. Arthur O'Neill, first British Member of Parliament killed in the war.
- Second Lieutenant Clyde Bowman Pearce, first Australian born winner of the Australian Golf Open (1908)
- Lance-Sergeant Leonard Sutton, English first-class cricketer (serving with Canadians)
- Private Arthur Wilson, English rugby international.
- Second Lieutenant Euan Lucie-Smith, the first mixed race officer to be killed in war. (Originally recorded on Ploegsteert Memorial to the Missing) but served with Warwickshire Regiment listed in Menin Gate.

== Last Post ceremony ==
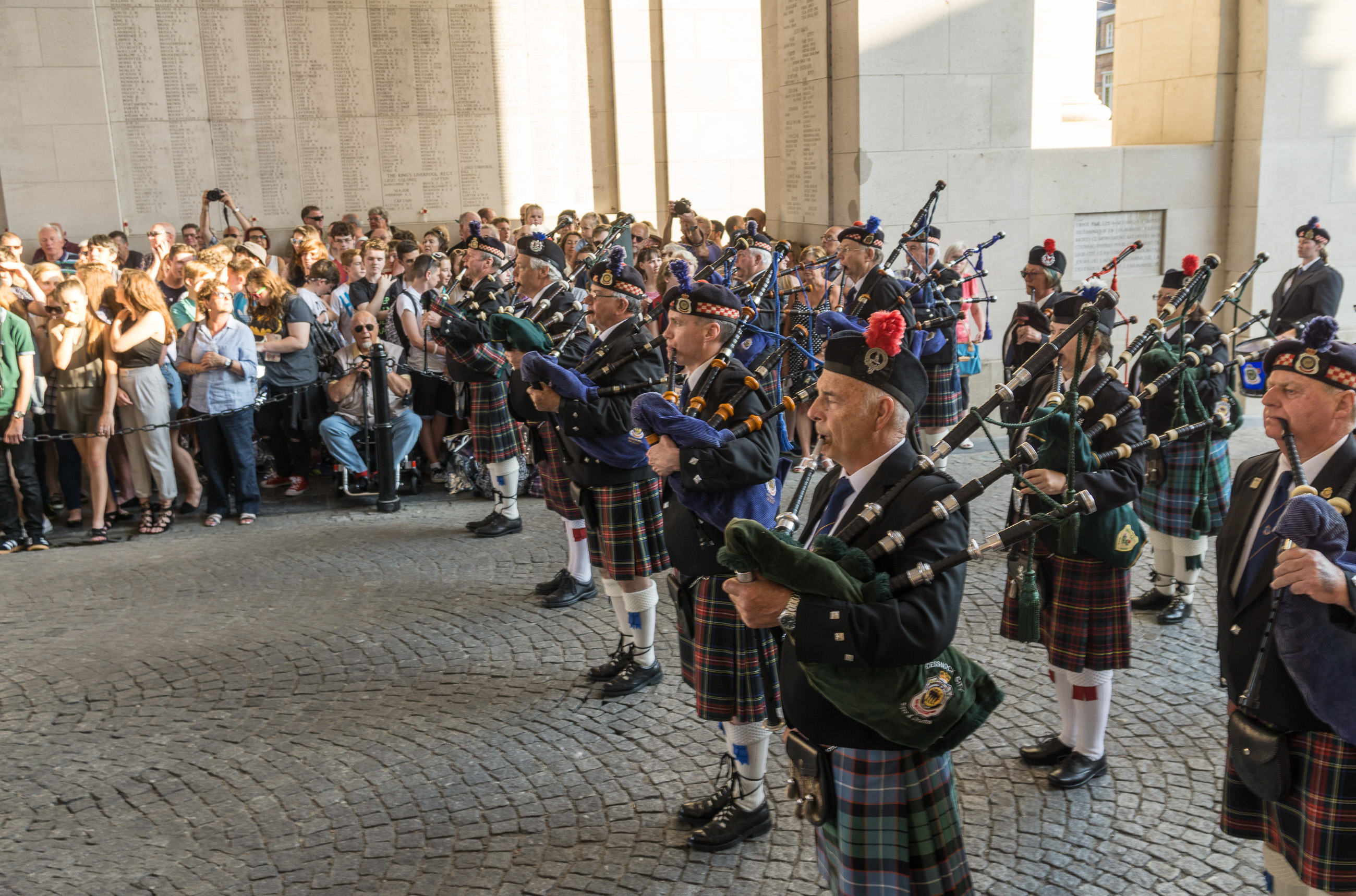
In July 2016, the Combined RSL Centenary of ANZAC (Australia) Pipes & Drums played during the Last Post ceremony.

Following the Menin Gate Memorial opening in 1927, the citizens of Ypres wanted to express their gratitude towards those who had given their lives for Belgium's freedom. Every evening at 20:00, buglers from the Last Post Association close the road which passes under the memorial and sound the "Last Post". Except for the occupation by the Germans in World War II when the daily ceremony was conducted at Brookwood Military Cemetery, in Surrey, England, this ceremony has been carried on uninterrupted since 2 July 1928. On the evening that Polish forces liberated Ypres in the Second World War, on 6 September 1944 the ceremony was resumed at the Menin Gate despite the fact that heavy fighting was still taking place in other parts of the town.

During an extended version of the ceremony, individuals or groups may lay a wreath to commemorate the fallen. Bands, choirs and military units from around the world may apply to participate in the ceremonies. This extended version of the ceremony also starts at 20:00, but lasts longer than the normal ceremony, when only the Last Post is played.

The Last Post Association is an independent, voluntary, non-profit-making organisation. It first founded the Last Post Ceremony back in 1928, and is responsible for the day-to-day organisation of this unique act of homage. It administers the Last Post Fund, which provides the financial resources necessary to support the ceremony. It is a tradition that the Buglers of the Association should wear the uniform of the local volunteer Fire Brigade, of which they are all required to become members.

The Last Post was a bugle call played in the British Army, and in the armies of many other lands, to mark the end of the day's labours and the onset of the night's rest. In the context of the Last Post ceremony, and in the broader context of remembrance, it has come to represent a final farewell to the fallen at the end of their earthly labours, and at the onset of their eternal rest.

Similarly, the Reveille was a bugle call played at the beginning of the day, to rouse the troops from slumber and to call them to their duties. In the context of the Last Post ceremony, and in the broader context of remembrance, the Reveille symbolises a return to daily life at the end of the act of homage, and the ultimate resurrection of the fallen on the Day of Judgement. Schedules are available on the Last Post website.

== In art ==
Menin Gate at Midnight, also known as Ghosts of Menin Gate, is a 1927 painting by Australian artist Will Longstaff. The painting depicts a host of ghostly soldiers marching across a field in front of the Menin Gate war memorial. The painting is part of the collection of the Australian War Memorial in Canberra.

== Other memorials ==
On the city walls near the Menin Gate are further memorials to Allied soldiers who fought and died at Ypres, the most notable being those to the Gurkhas and Indian soldiers.

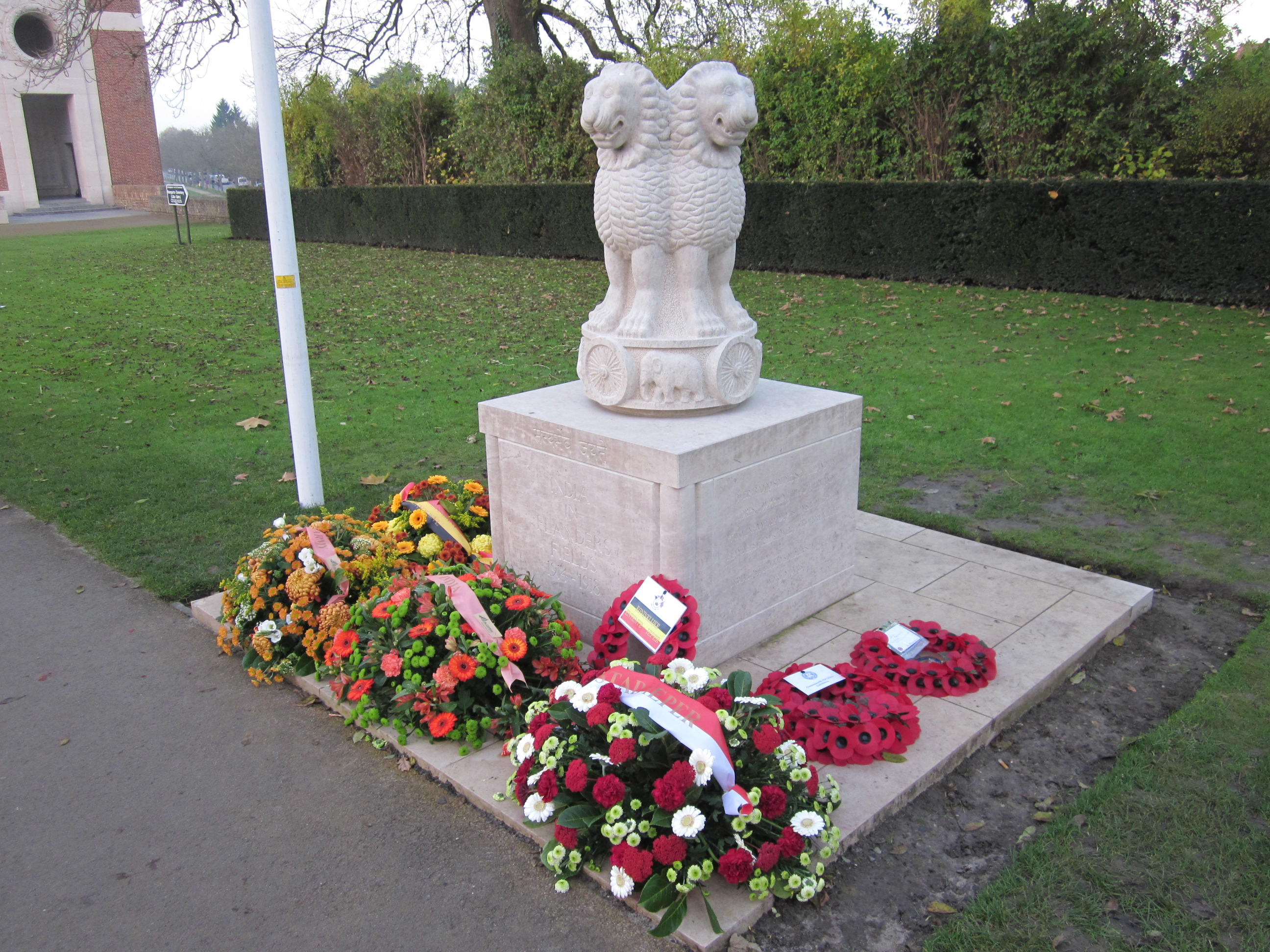
Monument to Indian soldiers

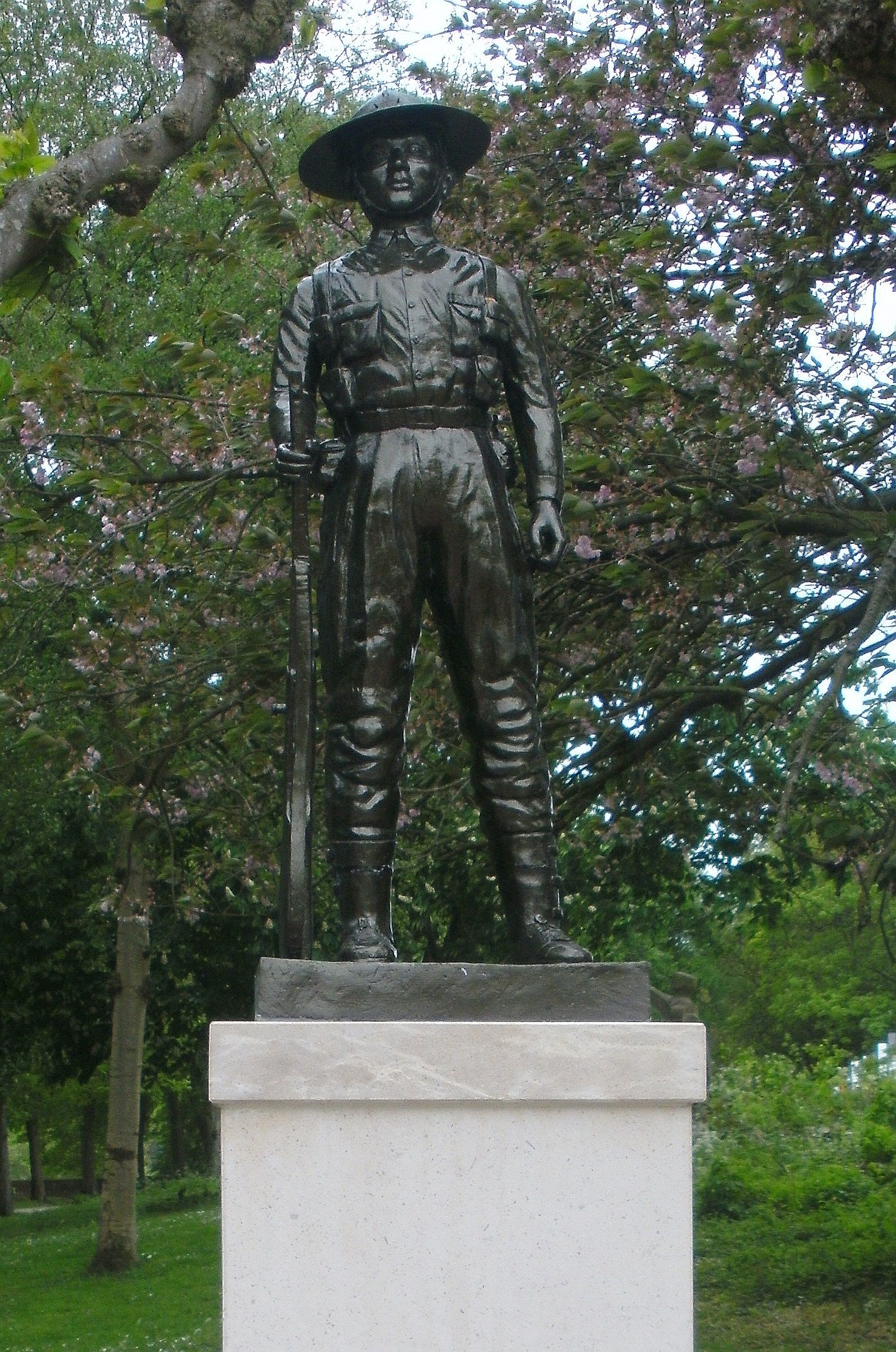
Gurkha memorial

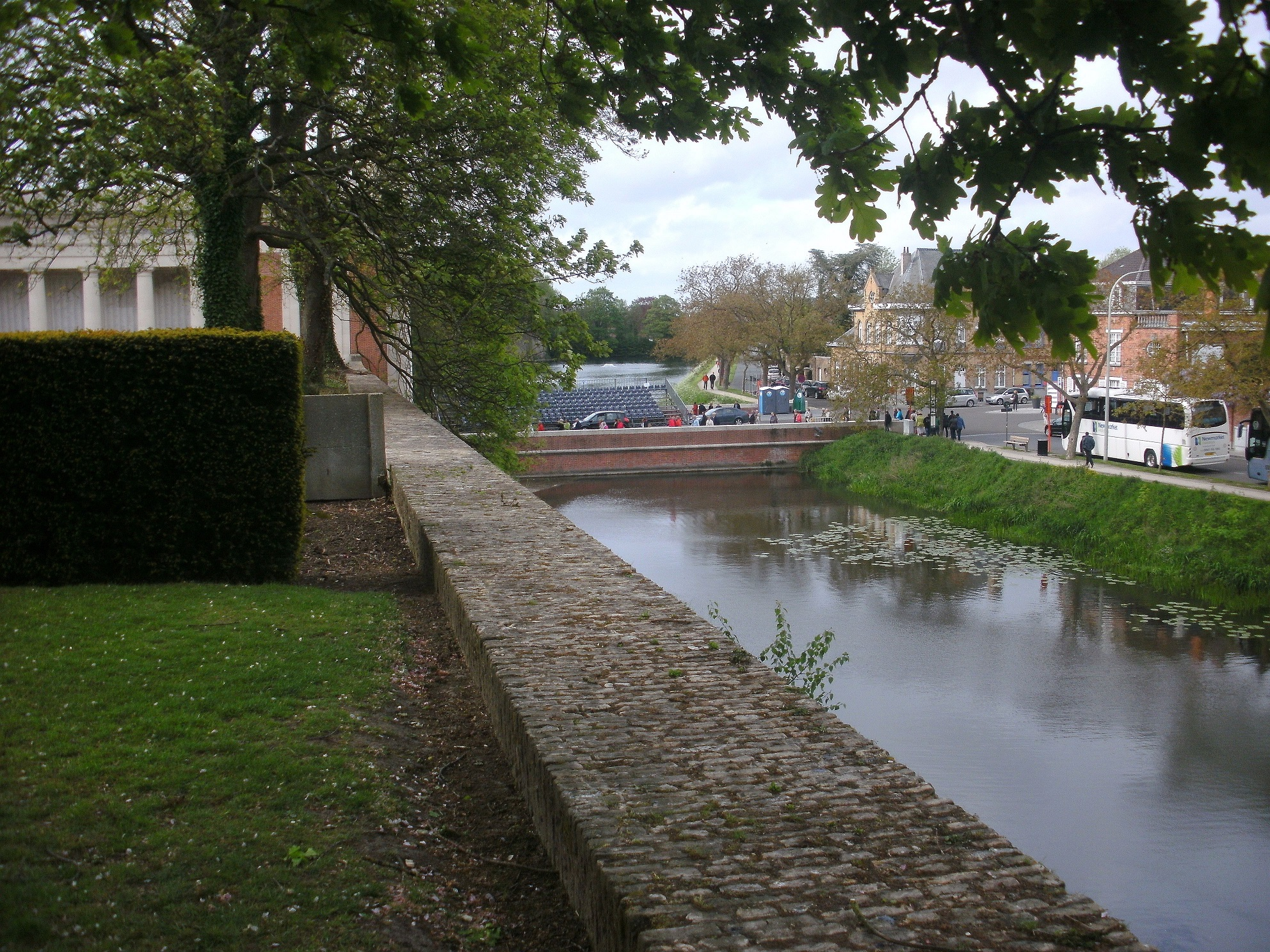
Town ramparts near Menin Gate

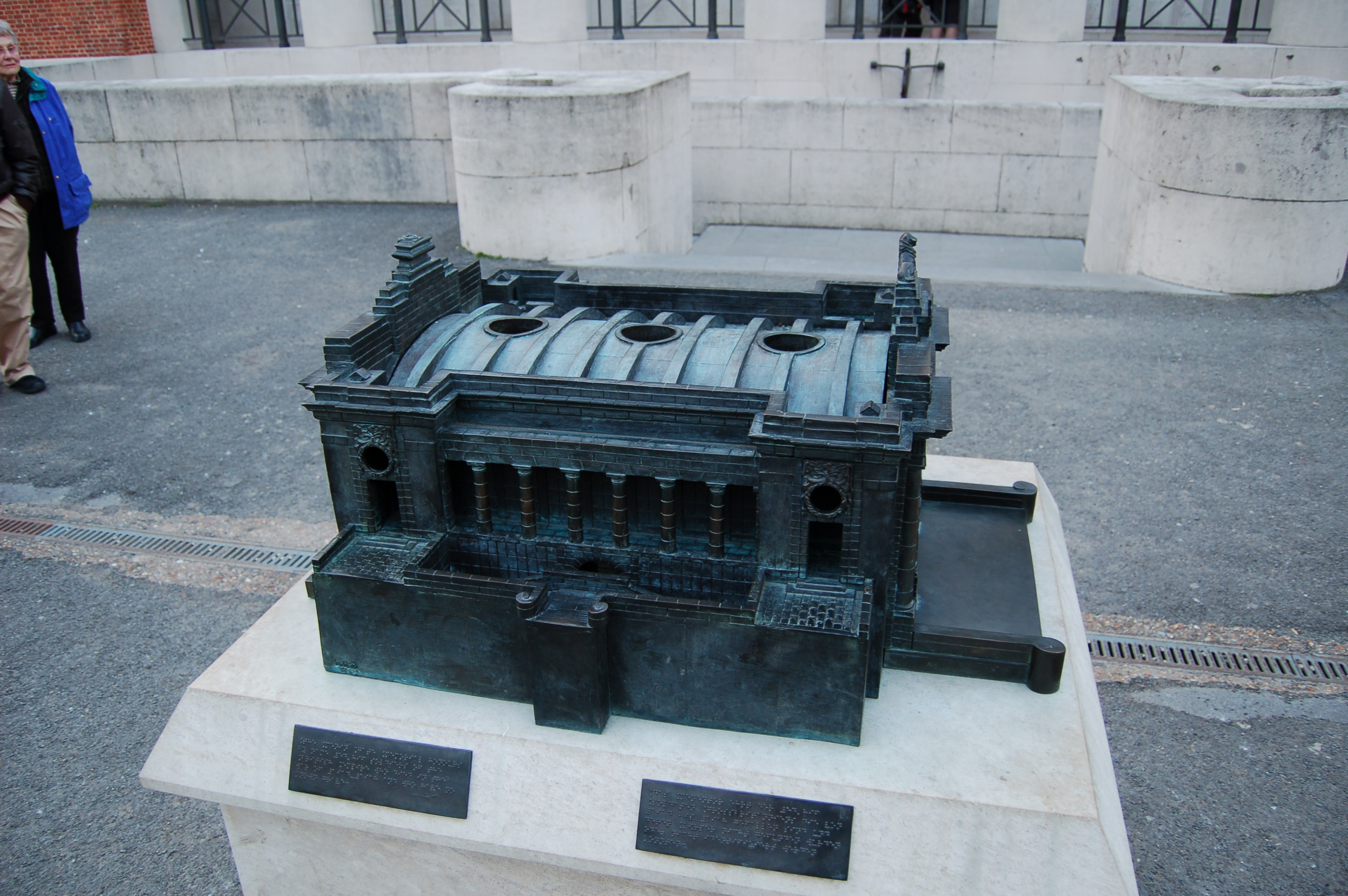
Tactile model of Menin Gate

== See also ==
- List of Commonwealth War Graves Commission World War I memorials to the missing in Belgium and France
