= Leonard Sutton =

English cricketer

Personal information
- Full name: Leonard Cecil Leicester Sutton
- Born: 14 April 1890; Half Way Tree, Kingston, Jamaica
- Died: 3 June 1916 (aged 26); Zillebeke, Belgium
- Batting: Left-handed
- Bowling: Left-arm slow
- Role: Batsman

Domestic team information
- Years: Team
- 1909–1912: Somerset
- First-class debut: 17 May 1909 Somerset v Hampshire
- Last First-class: 17 July 1912 Somerset v Derbyshire

Career statistics
Competition	First-class
Matches	17
Runs scored	171
Batting average	7.12
100s/50s	–/–
Top score	30
Balls bowled	6
Wickets	–
Bowling average	–
5 wickets in innings	–
10 wickets in match	–
Best bowling	0/6
Catches/stumpings	5/–
- Source: CricketArchive, 17 January 2011

Leonard Cecil Leicester Sutton (14 April 1890 – 3 June 1916) played first-class cricket for Somerset from 1909 to 1912. He was born at Half Way Tree, Kingston, Jamaica, and died at Zillebeke, Belgium, in the Ypres area of fighting in the First World War.

Sutton was a left-handed middle- or lower-order batsman and an occasional slow left-arm orthodox spin bowler. He was educated at King's School, Bruton where he was described in the school magazine as "a good hard-hitting bat with plenty of strokes, notably an excellent off-drive, a magnificent shot just behind point, a good late cut and a fine powerful pull." He also opened the bowling for the school team. He was still at school when he made his first appearances for Somerset: in his debut match against Hampshire at Southampton in May 1909 he made 30 in Somerset's second innings after Hampshire enforced the follow on; that was to be his highest score in first-class cricket. In 1912, Sutton appeared in 11 of Somerset's first-class games, but he made only 118 runs in total with a highest score of only 24, and he did not appear in first-class cricket after this season.

Sutton was a lance-sergeant in the Canadian Infantry (Central Ontario Regiment) at the time of his death in the First World War. His name is commemorated on the Menin Gate at Ypres. The King's Bruton magazine indicates that he was attached to the 4th Canadian Mounted Rifles, though CMR records on the internet do not support this.
