= Percy Banks =

English cricketer and soldier (1885–1915)

Personal information
- Full name: Percy d'Aguilar Banks
- Born: 9 May 1885; Bath, Somerset, England
- Died: 26 April 1915 (aged 29); Ypres salient, West Flanders, Belgium
- Batting: Right-handed

Domestic team information
- Years: Team
- 1903–1908: Somerset
- First-class debut: 31 August 1903 Somerset v Hampshire
- Last First-class: 29 June 1908 Somerset v Yorkshire

Career statistics
Competition	First-class
Matches	7
Runs scored	161
Batting average	12.38
100s/50s	0/0
Top score	30
Catches/stumpings	1/–
- Source: CricketArchive, 8 December 2012

Percy d'Aguilar Banks (9 May 1885 – 26 April 1915) played first-class cricket for Somerset in 1903 and 1908. He was born at Bath, Somerset and died in the First World War fighting at the Ypres salient, Belgium.

Banks was educated at Cheltenham College and as a schoolboy cricketer he made 103 in the annual Cheltenham match against Haileybury College at Lord's in 1902. A right-handed batsman, he appeared in a single match for Somerset in 1903 and then returned for six more games in 1908, batting mostly in the middle- or lower order but on occasion opening the batting. He made some runs in most games, but his highest score in first-class cricket was only 30, made against Yorkshire in his last first-class game.

Graduating from the Royal Military College, Sandhurst, in 1903, Banks became an officer in the Duke of Edinburgh's Wiltshire Regiment. In 1906, he was promoted from second lieutenant to full lieutenant and was attached to the Queen's Own Corps of Guides, one of the British India regiments. He was further promoted to be captain in 1912. At the time of his death in the First World War, he was attached to the 57th Wilde's Rifles, an Indian Army regiment that was transferred back to Europe to join the fighting in and around Ypres. During the war, he had been mentioned in dispatches. His death is commemorated on the Menin Gate in Ypres.
