= Menin Gate at Midnight =

1927 painting by Will Longstaff

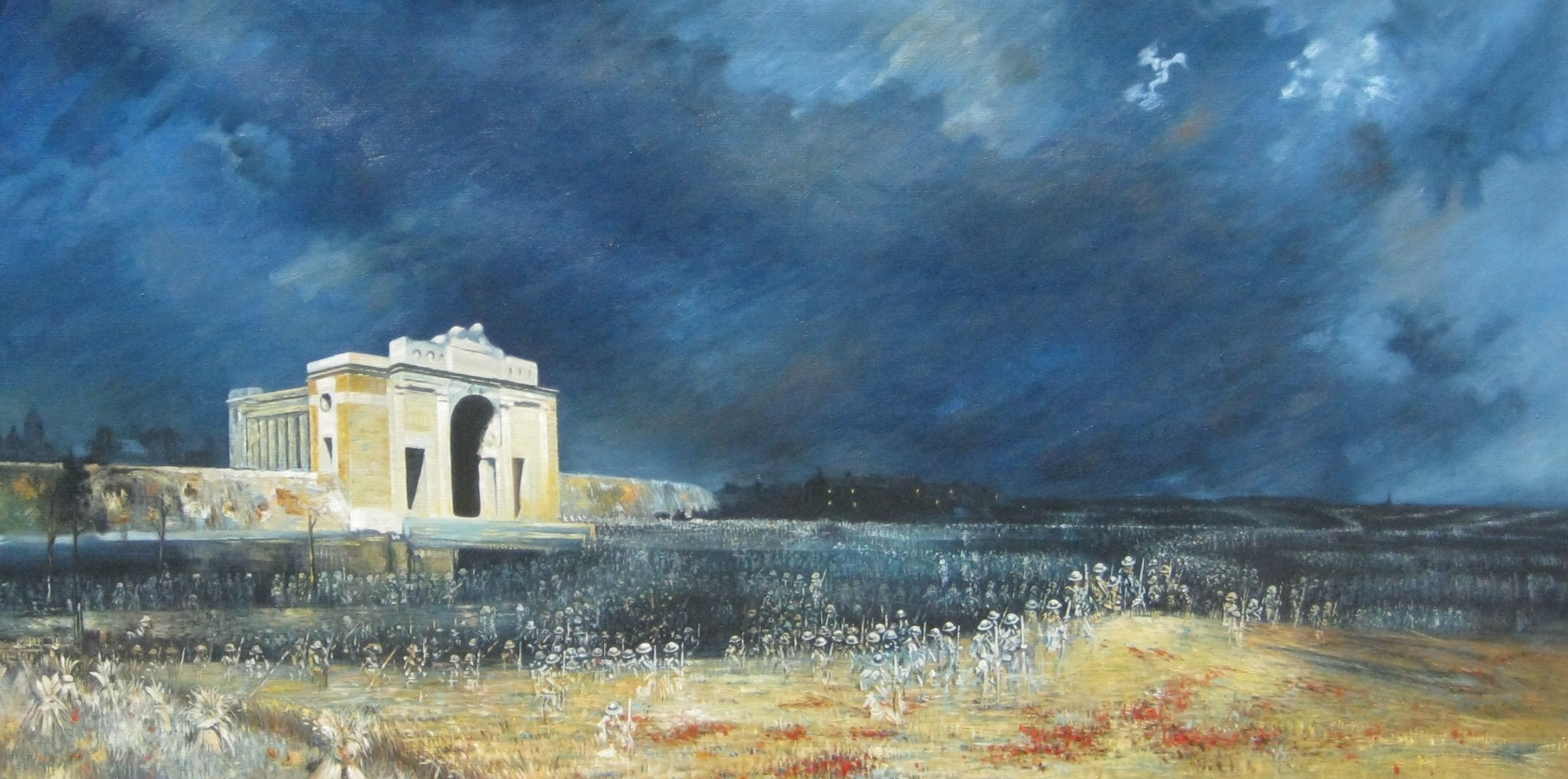
- Artist: Will Longstaff
- Year: 1927
- Medium: Oil on canvas
- Subject: Ghostly soldiers marching across a field in front of the Menin Gate war memorial
- Dimensions: 137 cm × 170 cm (54 in × 67 in)
- Location: Australian War Memorial; Canberra
- Accession: ART09807
- Website: www.awm.gov.au/collection/C172234

Menin Gate at Midnight (also known as Ghosts of Menin Gate) is a 1927 painting by Australian artist Will Longstaff. The painting depicts a host of ghostly soldiers marching across a field in front of the Menin Gate war memorial. The painting is part of the collection of the Australian War Memorial in Canberra.

Longstaff painted the work after attending the unveiling of the Menin Gate memorial, at Ypres in Belgium, on 24 July 1927. The memorial commemorated those men of the British Empire, including Australia, who died in the battles of the First World War and have no known grave. Walking around the streets of Ypres after the ceremony, Longstaff was said to have seen a "vision of steel-helmeted spirits rising from the moonlit cornfields around him". Returning to London, Longstaff was reported to have painted the work in a single session, while "still under psychic influence".

The painting was immediately popular. It was purchased by Lord Woolavington for 2,000 guineas and presented to the Australian government. After a royal command viewing at Buckingham Palace for George V and the Royal family, the painting was displayed in Manchester and Glasgow. It was then taken around Australia, where record crowds paid to view the work. Longstaff oversaw the making of 2,000 prints, and 400 of those were given to the nascent Australian War Memorial to sell to raise funds.

== Related works ==
The success of this work led Longstaff to paint three later companion pieces with a similar ghostly, spiritualist theme as can be seen below:

Related works by Will Longstaff
Name	Year painted	Thumbnail	Description	Location	Notes
Immortal Shrine (Eternal Silence)	1928	Immortal Shrine (Eternal Silence)	Showing ghostly soldiers marching past the Cenotaph in London on Remembrance Day	The Australian War Memorial, Canberra	
The Ghosts of Vimy Ridge	1931	The Ghosts of Vimy Ridge	Depicting men of the Canadian Corps at Vimy Ridge	Railway Committee Room, Parliament of Canada	
Carillon	1932	New Zealand soldiers in Belgium hear the bells of their homeland	New Zealand soldiers in Belgium hearing the bells in their native country	Archives New Zealand	Multiple chromolithographs were produced for New Zealand schools. Several copies are now preserved at the National Library of New Zealand
