= John Hastie =

John Hastie may refer to:

- John Hastie (rugby union) (1908–1965), Scottish rugby union player
- John Hastie (sport shooter) (1938–2021), New Zealand sport shooter and gunsmith
- John Hastie (umpire) (1932–2026), New Zealand cricket umpire
