= Jim Hastie (footballer) =

Scottish footballer

Personal information
- Full name: James MacDonald Hastie
- Date of birth: 17 August 1949 (age 77)
- Place of birth: Dumbarton, Scotland
- Position: Right back

Youth career
- Glasgow University

Senior career*
Years	Team	Apps	(Gls)
1970–1972	Queen's Park	13	(0)

International career
1969–1971	Scotland Amateurs	5	(0)
- * Club domestic league appearances and goals

James MacDonald Hastie (born 17 August 1949) is a Scottish former amateur footballer who played as a right back in the Scottish League for Queen's Park. He was capped by Scotland at amateur level and later served as president of Queen's Park.
