= Hasty attack =

Hasty attack is a specific form of attack identified within United States and Canadian military doctrine, in which upon contact with the enemy that is unprepared a unit decides to conduct an attack with limited planning and coordination and with rapid preparation and execution to exploit the enemy's weakness. Though applicable to infantry operations historically and in modern times, hasty attacks are a hallmark of mechanized force operations. During the Civil War, the command for a hasty attack was "sally forth".

FM 17-97, the United States Army field manual for Cavalry Troop operations, defines it as: "A hasty attack is conducted with a minimum of preparation to defeat an enemy force that is not prepared or deployed to fight. It is a course of action routinely employed in cavalry operations to seize or retain the initiative, or to sustain the tempo of operations. A hasty attack can be executed while the troop is engaged with a zone reconnaissance mission or movement to contact."

The hasty attack stands in contrast to a deliberate attack, an offensive mission conducted to defeat enemy forces in prepared defensive positions or strongpoints, employing detailed tactical planning and rehearsal of the attack, or a raid which is an attack into enemy territory for a specific purpose, with no intent to gain or hold terrain, and where the unit returns to friendly lines after the attack.

A textbook example of a hasty attack was the Battle of 73 Easting. There the cavalry troop commander Captain H. R. McMaster upon advancing into an Iraqi Armor Brigade assembly area ordered his unit to advance and engage the Iraqis, exploiting surprise and momentum to win a decisive victory over a much larger and heavily armed force.

== Critical tasks ==
In executing a successful hasty attack, the following tasks are considered critical:

- Reconnaissance to determine the size, composition, and orientation of the enemy force.
- Determining the level of support the objective enemy force may receive from other nearby units.
- Finding a high-speed concealed approach into the enemy's flank(s).
- Establish a maneuver element within the unit to move to a position of advantage over the enemy and attack him by direct fire.
- Establish a base-of-fire element within the unit to defeat or suppress enemy anti-tank weapons with long-range direct and indirect fires before the maneuver element begins its attack.
- Isolate the enemy's forces from other mutually supporting units with indirect fires.
- Attack the enemy by fire or by fire and movement, and defeat him.
- Once the attack is completed, immediately establish hasty defensive positions and observation posts on high-speed avenues of approach to the position.

== Hasty attack techniques ==
Successful hasty attacks rely much upon the commander's sense of timing in executing the critical tasks in the proper sequence. The ability to synchronize, concentrate and apply all the different forms of offensive capability available against the enemy at the right times and places is crucial to a good hasty attack. The decision to conduct a hasty attack is usually made after reconnaissance of an enemy force shows that the element of surprise has presented a compelling opportunity or winning requires a quick strike with little preparation. According to FM 17-97, tactics for conducting a hasty attack have three common features:

- Known or suspected enemy heavy weapons are suppressed and destroyed with direct and/or indirect fire before the maneuver force is committed.
- The enemy is forced to fight in two directions.
- The enemy is suppressed and unable to react.

== Preparing for hasty attack ==
The commander may first become aware of the possibility for hasty attack when scouts in contact with the enemy recommend a hasty attack as a course of action. The unit commander may then decide to execute the recommended course of action. In that case the commander will then issue orders to position forces to execute an attack with minimal planning and preparation.

Leading up to the hasty attack, the reconnaissance element in contact with the enemy will generally continue to reconnoiter the enemy's position and perform their tasks. Often one section will remain in contact with the enemy while another will continue its reconnaissance up to a limit of advance established by the commander. Both reconnaissance elements are looking for the presence of other enemy units, to the flanks or rear, supporting the objective enemy unit. Immediately prior to the attack the commander may choose to direct the battle from the position of the reconnaissance element in overwatch.

In a hasty attack often a fire support team will be positioned in such a way that allows it to oversee the battlefield to control the indirect fire. Any organic fire support, like mortar sections, will establish firing positions and prepare to suppress the enemy position.

The size and strength of the enemy may require the use of tank and/or anti-tank units.
