= Thomas Hastie Bell =

British anarchist

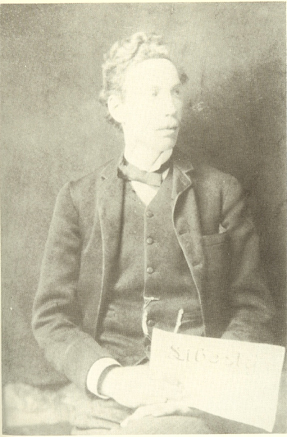
- Thomas H. Bell, 1888
- Born: 1867; Edinburgh
- Died: 1942 (aged 75)
- Spouse: Lizzie Turner Bell

Thomas Hastie Bell (1867–1942) was a Scottish anarchist.

== Biography ==
Thomas Hastie Bell was born in Edinburgh in 1867.

Rudolf Rocker describes him as six feet (1.8 metres) tall, red-haired with a bushy beard in his later years.

In his youth he was a member of the Scottish Land and Labour League and in the 1880s through involvement with the Socialist League became an anarchist.

While in Paris, he urged anarchists in France for an open-air meeting and distributed handbills. In Place de la République in a Sunday, amidst a big crowd and policemen, he climbed up a lamp-post and gave a speech. The police threatened him with prosecution for "insults to the Army and the law", but the authorities were not inclined to prosecute him. After two weeks in jail he was expelled as "too dangerous a man to be allowed loose in France".

On the visit of Tsar Nicholas II to Leith on Tuesday 22 September 1896, Bell got through to the Tsar's carriage and shouted in his face "Down with the Russian tyrant! To hell with all the empires!" Again the British authorities decided not to prosecute him, because a Scottish jury would probably throw out any charges.

In 1898 Bell left for London and was involved with the Freedom group there.

Bell moved to New York in 1904 living with anarchist Charles B. Hooper and moving with his wife Lizzie Turner Bell and daughter Marion Bell, to Arizona in 1910.

Bell was a well known anarchist who had friendships with Emma Goldman, Rudolf Rocker and Peter Kropotkin. Bell was also a close friend of Oscar Wilde.

Emma Goldman described Bell as "of whose propagandistic zeal and daring we had heard much in America".

Bell died in 1942 aged 75.

== Publications ==
- Edward Carpenter: The English Tolstoi. Los Angeles: Libertarian Group. 1932.
- Oscar Wilde: Sus Amigos, Sus Adversarios, Sus Ideas (in Spanish). Buenos Aires: Americalee. 1946.
