= Sarah Hasted =

American curator and art dealer

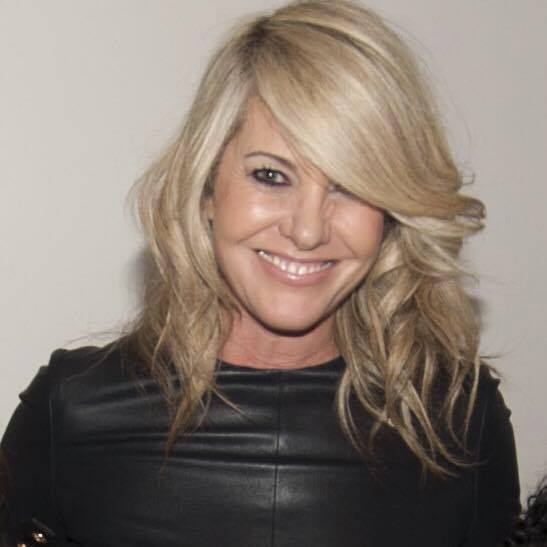
Portrait of Sarah Hasted

Sarah Hasted is an American curator and art dealer. Hasted was the founder and co-owner of contemporary art galleries, Hasted Hunt and Hasted Kraeutler, and has been a curator and art dealer for over 25 years. She has consulted for private collectors, and placed works of art with major Museums as well as corporate collections worldwide. Hasted has also been an adjunct professor at Parson's School of Design since 2003. In January 2017, Hasted was elected President of the Board of a not for profit organization, Moving Mountains Theater Company, founded by actor Jamie Hector from The Wire.

== Early life and education ==
Hasted was raised in Santa Fe, New Mexico, the daughter of John D. Hasted, a professor of English literature, Shakespeare, and creative writing at The College of Santa Fe ( Santa Fe University of Art and Design: New Mexico Art College). Her mother, Donna Clair, is a traditional landscape painter, living in Taos, New Mexico. Hasted attended Santa Fe Public High School. After high school she attended college and graduated with honors, receiving her Bachelor of Fine Arts Degree in Photography from The College of Santa Fe in 1991. After college, she had a brief career as a working artist. Her artworks were acquired by the Intel Corporation and one was acquired by and is in the permanent collection of the Art Institute of Chicago.

== Career ==
Hasted's career in the arts began in 1991, with her first position in an art gallery immediately post graduation, as an assistant at the Scheinbaum & Russek gallery for 5 years, where she worked with her photography teacher, David Scheinbaum and his wife, artist and photographer, Janet Russek. There she assisted in the curating of exhibitions by Sebastiao Salgado, Beaumont Newhall and Eliot Porter and many more. Hasted was hired in 1997, as the associate director of the Howard Greenberg gallery and moved to New York, where she worked with vintage photography and contemporary artists, assisting in curating exhibitions by Gilles Peress, Imogen Cunningham and Iwao Yamawaki. In 1999, Hasted became the co-director of Photography at Ricco/Maresca Gallery, alongside W.M.Hunt where she instituted and directed the photography department, until they founded and opened their own gallery, Hasted Hunt, in 2005. There she discovered, mentored and strategized the careers of artists, Paolo Ventura, Andreas Gefeller Erwin Olaf as well as many others. Hasted Hunt secured worldwide exclusive representation of most of the artists, specifically, Albert Watson and Jean-Paul Goude.

In the middle of the economic recession of 2008, Hasted motivated her colleagues in the photography community to band together to survive the difficult economy. A total of 13 photography galleries held exhibitions simultaneously, all photographs were images of New York and they send out a joint press release The show was reviewed by WNYC. In 2009, Hasted moved the gallery to a ground floor space on 24th Street in the heart of New York's art district. In 2011, the gallery became Hasted Kraeutler, and there Hasted discovered the works of Awol Erizku, Pierre Gonnord and many others. Over the years, Hasted has curated hundreds of exhibitions in all mediums and become an expert in her field. The gallery was regarded as a showcase for emerging and established artists, and a recognized venue for contemporary art worldwide.

After her brother, John A. Hasted died suddenly on Christmas Eve in 2014, Hasted semi-retired from the art business. In August 2015, the Hasted Kraeutler gallery closed, due to conflict between Hasted and Kraeutler involving accusations of financial misappropriation and missing artwork, leading to lawsuits.

In 2015, Hasted was hired as a consultant by Edelman Companies, focusing on the resale of blue chip artworks such as Pablo Picasso, Joseph Cornell, Keith Haring and Frank Stella. Sarah Hasted founded International Art Advisory LLC in 2015, which represents artists from across the globe.

== Teaching ==
Hasted was hired in 2003 as an adjunct professor by Parsons the New School of Design to develop and create a new class for their cirriculum focused on Editing and Curating in Photography. In 2008, Hasted became part-time assistant professor. For the past 18 years, she has taught the BFA and MFA thesis class in photography, in addition to the original editing class.

== Awards and affiliations ==
From 2005 to 2007, Hasted served on the Benefit Arts Committee for In Motion (Her Justice), an organization that provides legal services for domestically abused women. In January 2017, Hasted was elected as President of the Board of a not for profit organization, Moving Mountains Theater Company, founded by Jamie Hector an actor in the recognized series by HBO The Wire.
