= James Hastie (footballer) =

Scottish footballer

Personal information
- Date of birth: 1892
- Place of birth: Edrom, Scotland
- Date of death: 14 December 1914 (aged 22)
- Place of death: West Flanders, Belgium
- Position: Right back

Senior career*
Years	Team	Apps	(Gls)
- Selkirk
- Stockport County
- Gordon Highlanders
1914–1915	St. Bernard's	1	(0)
- * Club domestic league appearances and goals

James Hastie (1892 – 14 December 1914) was a Scottish professional footballer who played as a right back in the Scottish Football League for St. Bernard's.

== Personal life ==
Hastie worked in an electrical power station in Edinburgh. Prior to the First World War, he served in the King's Own Scottish Borderers as a territorial. After the outbreak of the war, Hastie enlisted as a private in the Gordon Highlanders in Aberdeen, and was killed in action in West Flanders on 14 December 1914. He is commemorated on the Menin Gate.

== Career statistics ==
Appearances and goals by club, season and competition
Club	Season	League			Scottish Cup		Total	
Club	Season	Division	Apps	Goals	Apps	Goals	Apps	Goals
St. Bernard's	1914–15	Scottish Second Division	1	0	0	0	1	0
Career total			1	0	0	0	1	0
