= Jim Hastie =

Scottish cricketer

Personal information
- Full name: James Henderson Hastie
- Born: 20 June 1920; Glasgow, Lanarkshire
- Died: 7 August 1996 (aged 76); Honiton, Devon
- Batting: Left-handed
- Bowling: Slow left-arm orthodox

Domestic team information
- Years: Team
- 1951: Minor Counties
- 1938–1954: Buckinghamshire

Career statistics
Competition	First-class
Matches	1
Runs scored	37
Batting average	18.50
100s/50s	0/0
Top score	22
Catches/stumpings	0/–
- Source: Cricinfo, 4 June 2011

James Henderson Hastie (20 June 1920 – 7 August 1996) was a Scottish cricketer. Hastie was a left-handed batsman who bowled slow left-arm orthodox. He was born at Glasgow, Lanarkshire.

Hastie made his debut for Buckinghamshire in the 1939 Minor Counties Championship against Hertfordshire. Hastie next played for Buckinghamshire after World War II, playing Minor counties cricket from 1924 to 1954, making 25 further appearances.

He made his only first-class appearance for the Minor Counties cricket team against Kent in 1951. In the Minor Counties first-innings, he was dismissed for 15 by Simon Kimmins. In their second-innings, he scored 22 before being dismissed by Ted Witherden.

He died at Honiton, Devon, on 7 August 1996.
