= Jennifer Hastie =

British laser scientist

Jennifer E. Hastie is a British physicist specialising in the design of lasers, including Raman lasers based on synthetic diamond crystals, and vertical-external-cavity surface-emitting-lasers. She is a professor of physics at the University of Strathclyde, where she directs the Institute of Photonics.

== Education and career ==
Hastie studied laser physics and optoelectronics at the University of Strathclyde, earning a bachelor's degree in 2000 and completing her PhD in 2004.

She continued working at the University of Strathclyde after completing her doctorate, initially under a five-year postdoctoral fellowship from the Royal Academy of Engineering. She was awarded an EPSRC Challenging Engineering Award in 2011. She was appointed as director of the Institute of Photonics in 2022.

== Recognition ==
Hastie was elected a Senior Member of IEEE in 2012. Optica named her as a 2024 Optica Fellow, "for leadership in the photonics and quantum technology community and pioneering technical contributions in the area of narrow-linewidth lasers".
