= Will Longstaff =

Australian painter and war artist (1879–1953)

William Frederick Longstaff (25 December 1879 – 1 July 1953) was an Australian painter and war artist best known for his works commemorating those who died in the First World War.

== Birth and education ==
Born in Ballarat, Victoria, Longstaff was educated at Grenville College, Ballarat, studying art at the Ballarat School of Mines and privately before joining the military and serving in the Second Boer War as a member of the South African Light Horse. He was the cousin of portrait painter Sir John Longstaff.

== Career and the First World War ==
Upon returning to Australia, Longstaff continued to paint and teach art. He enlisted in the Australian Imperial Force at the outbreak of the First World War and was injured in the Gallipoli campaign. In October 1915 he joined a remount unit and served in France and Egypt. He was evacuated to England in 1917 where he began drawing again and was trained in the art of camouflage. During his time in Egypt, Longstaff had made images of the ANZAC Mounted Division and the other units. Upon his appointment as an Official War Artist in 1918 he produced numerous works during the final campaigns of the Western Front.

== Post-war ==
After the war, Longstaff continued his art, turning many of his sketches into paintings. Even after leaving the military, he remained in England, eventually settling in Sussex. Beginning in the late 1920s, he made return trips to the battlefields of Belgium and France and painted haunting images in a spiritualist style. Among these later works is Menin Gate at Midnight (1927), arguably his most famous, which depicts the ghostly figures of soldiers marching past the monument. The painting toured Australia in 1928–29. It was viewed by record crowds.

The painting is housed in the Australian War Memorial, Canberra. In December 2000, Menin Gate at Midnight left the War Memorial on loan to the National Gallery of Australia, the first time it had left the memorial since its installation there in 1941.

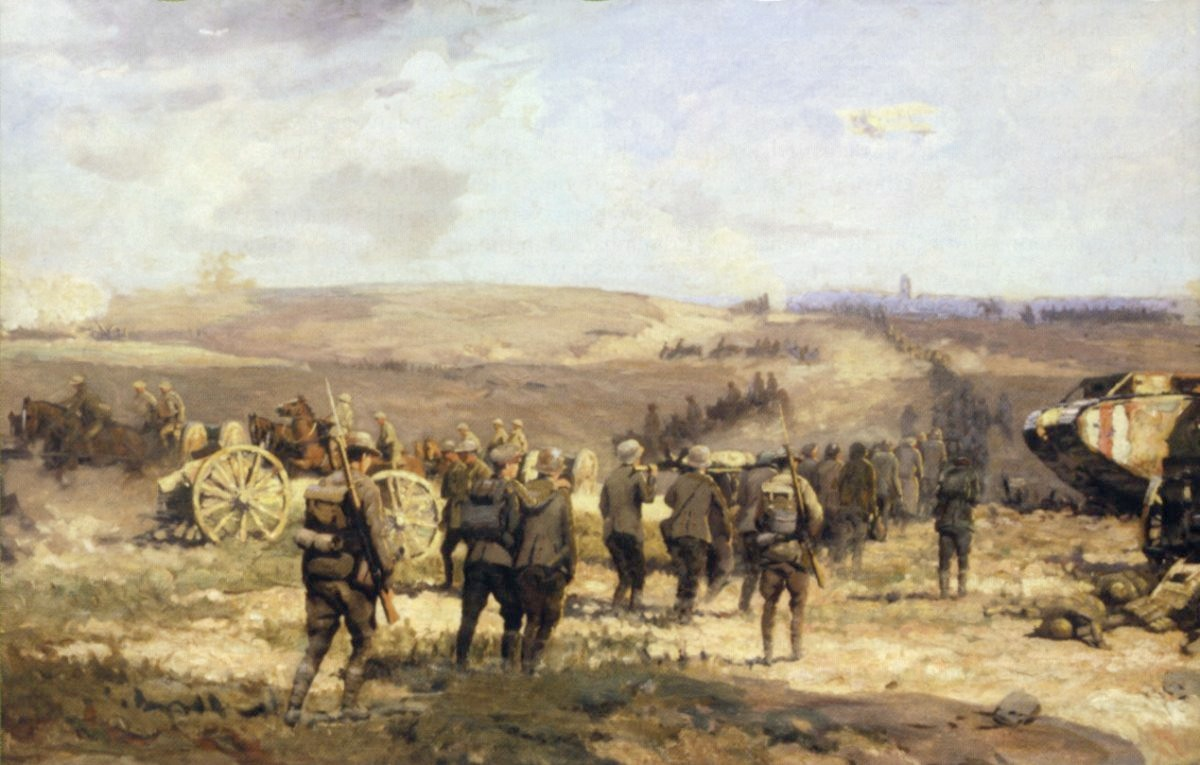
8th August, 1918, 1918–19

== Select works ==
- 8 August 1918, 1918–19
- Breaking the Hindenburg Line, 1918–19
- Menin Gate at Midnight (Ghosts of Menin Gate), 1927
- Immortal shrine (Eternal silence), 1928
- The rearguard (The spirit of ANZAC), 1928
- Ghosts of Vimy Ridge (Canadian National Vimy Memorial), 1931
- Carillon, 1934
- Drake's Drum, 1940
- The Battle of El Alamein, 1942 (National Army Museum), 1942
- Portrait of Ivy Tresmand, in MuseuMAfricA, Johannesburg, South Africa
- Portrait of John Anderson Gilruth, veterinary scientist and administrator, in the Australian Animal Health Laboratory in Geelong

== See also ==
- Australian official war artists
