= Haste =

Haste may refer to:

- Haste, Germany, a municipality in the district of Schaumburg in Lower Saxony
- USS Haste (PG-92), a Canadian corvette turned over to the United States Navy and manned by the Coast Guard
- Haste (album), a 2012 album by Veryan Weston, Ingrid Laubrock and Hannah Marshall

== People with the surname ==
- Carl Cohn Haste (1874–1939), a Danish pianist, organist and composer
- Jeff Haste, a former member of the Pennsylvania House of Representatives
- Shane Haste (born 1985), Australian professional wrestler
