= List of Oxford University Cricket Club players =

This is a list in alphabetical order of cricketers who have played for Oxford University Cricket Club (OUCC) in top-class matches since the club was first recorded in 1827. OUCC teams have always had important or first-class cricket status. In 1973 the team also played official List A cricket matches.

Some OUCC players have been members of teams representing combinations of British universities or, since 2001, the Oxford University Centre of Cricketing Excellence (OUCCE), later rebranded the Oxford Marylebone Cricket Club University (Oxford MCCU). This team includes students from other universities in the Oxford area and plays some first-class matches. Since the establishment of OUCCE the only first-class matches in which the OUCC team itself has played are the annual Varsity Matches against Cambridge University Cricket Club. The match will lose its first-class status after the 2020 fixture. This list includes only those players who have represented OUCC itself.

The details are the player's usual name followed by the years in which he was active as an OUCC player and then his name as it would appear on modern match scorecards. Note that many players represented other first-class teams besides OUCC. Players are shown to the end of the 2019 season.

As of 25 August 2019

== A ==
- Aamer Hameed (1979) : Aamer Hameed
- Abdul Hafeez Kardar (1947–1949) : Abdul Hafeez Kardar
- George Abell (1924–1927) : G. E. B. Abell
- John Abell (1952–1953) : J. N. Abell
- Sam Agarwal (2010–2013) : S. S. Agarwal
- Montague Ainslie (1843–1845) : M. M. Ainslie
- Henry Aitken (1853) : H. M. Aitken
- James Aitken (1848–1850) : J. Aitken
- Ian Akers-Douglas (1929–1930) : I. S. Akers-Douglas
- Henry Alington (1857–1859) : H. G. Alington
- Jimmy Allan (1953–1956) : J. M. Allan
- John Allen (2003) : J. A. Allen
- Jeremy Allerton (1967–1969) : J. W. O. Allerton
- David Allison (1970) : D. F. Allison
- Simon Almaer (1988–1990) : S. A. Almaer
- Harry Altham (1909–1912) : H. S. Altham
- Richard Altham (1947) : R. J. L. Altham
- Desmond Anderson (1992) : D. J. Anderson
- Ewan Anderson (1961–1962) : E. W. Anderson
- James Anderson (1955) : J. D. Anderson
- Omar Anwar (2003–2006) : O. Anwar
- Osmond Ardagh (1922) : O. C. Ardagh
- Anthony Ardington (1965) : A. J. Ardington
- John Arenhold (1953–1955) : J. A. Arenhold
- Harold Arkwright (1893–1895) : H. A. Arkwright
- Alan Armitage (1951) : A. K. Armitage
- William Armitstead (1853–1857) : W. G. Armitstead
- Philip Armstrong (1982–1983) : P. A. N. Armstrong
- Thomas Armstrong (1869–1870) : T. H. Armstrong
- Harry Arnall-Thompson (1886) : H. T. Arnall-Thompson
- Asad Jahangir Khan (1967–1969) : Asad Jahangir Khan
- A. G. G. Asher (1883–1884) : A. G. G. Asher
- Nathan Ashley (1999) : N. W. Ashley
- Nicholas Ashton (1924) : N. C. E. Ashton
- Thomas Ashwell (1919) : T. G. L. Ashwell
- David Ashworth (1966–1967) : D. A. Ashworth
- Asif Ahmed (1963–1964) : Asif Ahmed
- Jeremy Attfield (1995) : J. M. Attfield
- John Aubrey-Fletcher (1933) : J. H. L. Aubrey-Fletcher
- John Audland (1875) : J. H. Audland
- Edward Austin (1869) : E. J. Austin
- Mervyn Austin (1938) : M. N. Austin
- Robert Austin (1894) : R. G. L. Austin
- James Averis (1997) : J. M. M. Averis
- Robert Awdry (1902–1904) : R. W. Awdry

== B ==
- Henry Badger (1921) : H. D. Badger
- Peter Badham (1934) : P. H. C. Badham
- Abbas Ali Baig (1959–1962) : A. A. Baig
- Murtuza Baig (1961–1964) : M. A. Baig
- J. A. Bailey (1956–1958) : J. A. Bailey
- James Baiss (1929) : J. A. Baiss
- Reginald Baiss (1895) : R. S. H. Baiss
- John Baker (1955) : J. Baker
- Edward Balfour (1852–1854) : E. Balfour
- Alex Ball (2007–2009) : A. H. Ball
- Tristan Ballance (1935–1937) : T. G. L. Ballance
- Bernard Bannon (1897–1898) : B. D. Bannon
- Alan Barber (1927–1929) : A. T. Barber
- Robert Barbour (1922–1923) : R. R. P. Barbour
- Robert Bardsley (1910–1913) : R. V. Bardsley
- Gerald Bardswell (1894–1897) : G. R. Bardswell
- Andrew Barker (1964–1967) : A. H. Barker
- David Barker (1974) : P. D. Barker
- Jack Barley (1909) : J. C. Barley
- Edwin Barlow (1932–1934) : E. A. Barlow
- Micah Barlow (1894) : M. Y. Barlow
- Francis Barmby (1885) : F. J. Barmby
- Francis Barnard (1922–1924) : F. H. Barnard
- Jeremy Barnes (1997–1999) : J. P. B. Barnes
- Ronald Barnes (1906–1907) : R. G. Barnes
- Arthur Bartholomew (1866–1869) : A. C. Bartholomew
- John Bartlett (1946–1951) : J. N. Bartlett
- Michael Barton (1935–1937) : M. R. Barton
- Hubert Bassett (1888–1891) : H. Bassett
- E. W. Bastard (1882–1885) : E. W. Bastard
- Edward Bateman (1853–1856) : E. L. Bateman
- Francis Bateman-Champain (1897–1900) : F. H. Bateman-Champain
- Stuart Bathurst (1836–1839) : E. S. Bathurst
- Frederick Bathurst (1846–1849) : F. Bathurst
- J. Bathurst (1835–1838) : J. Bathurst
- Lawrence Bathurst (1893–1894) : L. C. V. Bathurst
- Robert Bathurst (1838–1839) : R. A. Bathurst
- Christopher Battarbee (1996–1997) : C. M. Battarbee
- Jonathan Batty (1996) : J. N. Batty
- Charles Bayly (1827–1832) : C. H. Bayly
- Fred Beart (1871) : F. R. Beart
- Charles Beauclerk (1835–1837) : C. W. Beauclerk
- Geoffrey Beck (1946) : G. E. Beck
- Andrew Beech (1987) : A. R. Beech
- Thomas Belcher (1869–1870) : T. H. Belcher
- David Bell (1971) : D. L. Bell
- Geoffrey Bell (1919) : G. F. Bell
- Brian Belle (1935–1936) : B. H. Belle
- Anthony Benn (1934–1935) : A. Benn
- George Bennett (1852–1856) : G. Bennett
- George Bennett (1903–1905) : G. G. M. Bennett
- Edward Benson (1928–1929) : E. T. Benson
- Charles Bere (1851) : C. S. Bere
- George Berkeley (1890–1893) : G. F. H. Berkeley
- John Bettington (1920–1922) : B. C. J. Bettington
- Reg Bettington (1920–1923) : R. H. B. Bettington
- James Bevin (2019) : J. M. M. Bevin
- Eric Bickmore (1920–1921) : A. F. Bickmore
- James Bird (1827–1829) : J. W. Bird
- Wilfred Bird (1904–1906) : W. S. Bird
- Harry Birrell (1953–1954) : H. B. Birrell
- Bhavya Bishnoi (2016) : B. Bishnoi
- Maxwell Blacker (1841) : M. J. Blacker
- Peter Blagg (1939) : P. H. Blagg
- Guy Blaikie (1921–1924) : K. G. Blaikie
- Peter Blake (1950–1952) : P. D. S. Blake
- Edward Vesey Bligh (1850) : E. V. Bligh
- Nigel Bloy (1946–1948) : N. C. F. Bloy
- Robert Boddington (1914) : R. A. Boddington
- Alnod Boger (1891–1892) : A. J. Boger
- William Bolitho (1883–1885) : W. E. T. Bolitho
- Hugh Bomford (1901–1904) : H. Bomford
- Andrew Bond (1999) : A. N. Bond
- Maurice Bonham Carter (1901–1902) : M. Bonham-Carter
- Brian Boobbyer (1949–1952) : B. Boobbyer
- John Borrer (1837–1838) : J. H. Borrer
- Bernard Bosanquet (1898–1900) : B. J. T. Bosanquet
- William Boswell (1912–1914) : W. G. K. Boswell
- Bertrand Bosworth-Smith (1895–1896) : B. N. Bosworth-Smith
- Norman Botton (1974–1975) : N. D. Botton
- Frederick Bowden-Smith (1861) : F. H. Bowden-Smith
- Philip Bower (1919) : P. S. S. Bower
- John Bowes-Lyon (1906–1907) : J. H. Bowes-Lyon
- Joseph Bowles (1834–1835) : J. Bowles
- Roger Bowles (1957) : R. A. Bowles
- Richard Bowman (1955–1957) : R. Bowman
- Trevor Bowring (1907–1908) : T. Bowring
- Courtenay Boyle (1865–1867) : C. E. Boyle
- Cecil Boyle (1873–1874) : C. W. Boyle
- Edward Bradby (1886) : E. H. F. Bradby
- Henry Bradby (1890) : H. C. Bradby
- Robert Braddell (1908–1911) : R. L. L. Braddell
- Walter Bradshaw (1929–1931) : W. H. Bradshaw
- Joseph Brain (1884–1887) : J. H. Brain
- William Brain (1891–1893) : W. H. Brain
- Druce Brandt (1907–1908) : D. R. Brandt
- Francis Brandt (1859–1861) : F. Brandt
- Trevor Branston (1904–1906) : G. T. Branston
- John Branston (1956) : J. R. M. Branston
- Patrick Brett (1929) : P. J. Brett
- David Brettell (1975–1978) : D. N. Brettell
- James Brettell (1984–1985) : J. G. Brettell
- Derek Bridge (1947) : D. J. W. Bridge
- Rawdon Briggs (1875–1876) : R. Briggs
- Orme Bristowe (1914) : O. C. Bristowe
- William Bristowe (1984–1985) : W. R. Bristowe
- Tom Brock (2017) : T. M. J. Brock
- Granville Bromley-Martin (1897–1898) : G. E. Bromley-Martin
- Richard Brooke (1931–1932) : R. H. J. Brooke
- Dickie Brooks (1967) : R. A. Brooks
- Henry Brougham (1911) : H. Brougham
- Lionel Brown (1892) : L. G. Brown
- Malcolm Brown (1988) : M. E. O. Brown
- Leigh Brownlee (1902–1904) : L. D. Brownlee
- Clarence Bruce (1905–1908) : C. N. Bruce
- Tom Bryan (2009–2011) : T. E. Bryan
- David Bryant (1970–1971) : D. J. Bryant
- Laurence Buchanan (1997–1998) : L. G. Buchanan
- Nick Buchanan (2009) : N. J. S. Buchanan
- Edward Buckland (1884–1887) : E. H. Buckland
- Francis Buckland (1874–1877) : F. M. Buckland
- David Buggé (1977) : D. A. B. Buggé
- Henry Bull (1863) : H. E. Bull
- James Bull (1996–1999) : J. J. Bull
- John Buller (1850) : J. Y. Buller
- William Bullock (1857–1860) : W. H. Bullock
- Richard Burchnall (1968–1971) : R. L. Burchnall
- Clive Burn (1902–1905) : R. C. W. Burn
- Philip Burnell (1967) : P. J. Burnell
- Herbert Burrell (1889) : H. J. E. Burrell
- William Burrin (1843) : W. Burrin
- John Burrough (1924–1926) : J. W. Burrough
- James Burrowes (1934) : J. T. Burrowes
- Montagu Burrows (1914–1921) : M. B. Burrows
- Mike Burton (1969–1971) : M. S. W. Burton
- Claude Burton (1911–1914) : R. C. Burton
- Tom Bury (1979–1980) : T. E. O. Bury
- John Bush (1950–1952) : J. E. Bush
- Graham Butcher (2001–2003) : G. R. Butcher
- Samuel Butler (1870–1873) : S. E. Butler
- Hugh Butterworth (1906) : H. M. Butterworth
- John Butterworth (1926) : J. C. Butterworth
- Reginald Butterworth (1926–1927) : R. E. C. Butterworth
- Robert Buxton (1906) : R. V. Buxton
- Walter Byles (1862) : W. B. Byles
- Byron Byrne (1997–2000) : B. W. Byrne
- Frederick Byron (1841) : F. Byron

== C ==
- David Cairns (1946) : J. D. Cairns
- Andrew Campbell (1968–1970) : A. N. Campbell
- Donald Campbell (1873–1876) : D. Campbell
- Iain Campbell (1949–1951) : I. P. Campbell
- Ion Campbell (1911–1913) : I. P. F. Campbell
- David Candler (1950–1951) : D. C. Candler
- Charles Cantlay (1975) : C. P. T. Cantlay
- Kenneth Carlisle senior (1903–1905) : K. M. Carlisle
- Kenneth Carlisle junior (1929) : K. R. M. Carlisle
- Denys Carnill (1950) : D. J. Carnill
- John Carpenter Garnier (1858) : J. Carpenter-Garnier
- Donald Carr (1948–1951) : D. B. Carr
- John Carr (1983–1985) : J. D. Carr
- Peter Carroll (1969–1971) : P. R. Carroll
- Edmund Carter (1865–1868) : E. S. Carter
- Buns Cartwright (1909–1910) : G. H. G. M. Cartwright
- Thomas Case (1864–1867) : T. Case
- Thomas Bennett Case (1891–1892) : T. B. Case
- Ernest Cassan (1859) : E. J. P. Cassan
- John Cassidy (1982) : J. J. Cassidy
- Sam Cato (2013–2015) : S. J. Cato
- William Cator (1860) : W. Cator
- Peter Cazalet (1927–1928) : P. V. F. Cazalet
- Arthur Cazenove (1851–1853) : A. Cazenove
- Tom Chadwick (2011–2013) : T. R. Chadwick
- Gerry Chalk (1931–1934) : F. G. H. Chalk
- Sanjay Chauhan (1989–1990) : S. Chauhan
- Martin Checksfield (1961) : M. F. J. Checksfield
- George Cherry (1841–1844) : G. C. Cherry
- John Chessher (1982–1983) : J. R. Chessher
- George Chesterton (1949) : G. H. Chesterton
- William Chetwynd-Talbot (1837) : W. W. C. Talbot
- Arthur Chitty (1879) : A. J. Chitty
- Joseph Chitty (1848–1849) : J. W. Chitty
- Robert Christie (1964) : R. D. Christie
- Percy Christopherson (1889) : P. Christopherson
- Manning Clark (1939) : C. M. H. Clark
- William Grasett Clarke (1840–1843) : W. G. Clarke
- John Alan Claughton (1976–1979) : J. A. Claughton
- John Andrew Claughton (1998–2000) : J. A. Claughton
- Tom Claughton (2015–2019) : T. H. Claughton
- Freddie Clayton (1893–1896) : F. G. H. Clayton
- William Clegg (1891) : W. G. Clegg
- Richard Clement (1853) : R. Clement
- Simon Clements (1976–1979) : S. M. Clements
- Paul Clinton (2004–2006) : P. J. S. Clinton
- Victor Clube (1956–1957) : S. V. M. Clube
- Henry Clutterbuck (1832) : H. R. Clutterbuck
- Arthur Cobb (1884–1886) : A. R. Cobb
- Alfred Cochrane (1885–1888) : A. H. J. Cochrane
- Jonathan Cockcroft (1997–1998) : J. R. Cockcroft
- Neville Cohen (1934) : N. Cohen
- John Coker (1840–1844) : J. Coker
- John Coldham (1925) : J. M. Coldham
- Edward Colebrooke (1880) : E. L. Colebrooke
- Charles Coleridge (1849–1850) : C. E. Coleridge
- Frederick Coleridge (1847–1850) : F. J. Coleridge
- Percival Coles (1885–1886) : P. Coles
- Richard Colley (1853–1855) : R. H. Colley
- John Collinge (1964) : J. G. Collinge
- Bernard Collins (1901) : B. A. Collins
- Ian Collins (1925) : I. G. Collins
- Lionel Collins (1899) : L. P. Collins
- Geoffrey Colman (1912–1914) : G. R. R. Colman
- William Commerell (1843) : W. A. Commerell
- Edward Compton (1896) : E. D. Compton
- Joseph Connaughton (1939) : J. M. F. Connaughton
- Stephen Conway (1999) : S. L. J. Conway
- John Cooke (1829) : J. Cooke
- Charles Cooper-Key (1877) : C. A. W. Cooper-Key
- Algernon Coote (1837–1840) : A. Coote
- James Cope (1986–1988) : J. E. B. Cope
- John Copleston (1860–1862) : J. H. Copleston
- Simon Corlett (1970–1972) : S. C. Corlett
- Andrew Corran (1958–1960) : A. J. Corran
- Ian Coutts (1951–1952) : I. D. F. Coutts
- Ralph Cowan (1980–1982) : R. S. Cowan
- Allan Cowburn (1841–1842) : A. Cowburn
- Colin Cowdrey (1952–1954) : M. C. Cowdrey
- Maurice Coxhead (1909–1910) : M. E. Coxhead
- Alan Coxon (1951–1954) : A. J. Coxon
- Walter Crawford (1919) : W. F. Crawford
- John Crawfurd (1900–1901) : J. W. F. A. Crawfurd
- Aidan Crawley (1927–1930) : A. M. Crawley
- Cosmo Crawley (1924–1925) : C. S. Crawley
- Mark Crawley (1987–1990) : M. A. Crawley
- Spencer Crawley (2008) : S. H. Crawley
- Ian Crichton (1963) : I. G. Crichton
- James Crisp (1951) : J. G. Crisp
- Christopher Crocker (1989) : C. S. C. Crocker
- Gerard Crole (1920) : G. B. Crole
- Arthur Croome (1887–1889) : A. C. M. Croome
- Charles Crosse (1875) : C. W. Crosse
- Philip Crowe (1982) : P. J. Crowe
- Gerry Crutchley (1910–1912) : G. E. V. Crutchley
- Robert Cruwys (1907) : R. G. Cruwys
- Mark Cullinan (1983–1984) : M. R. Cullinan
- Bruce Cumming (1936–1938) : B. L. Cumming
- Foster Cunliffe (1895–1898) : F. H. E. Cunliffe
- Charles Currer (1847–1848) : C. S. Currer
- John Currie (1956–1957) : J. D. Currie
- Herbert Curteis (1841–1842) : H. M. Curteis
- Andrew Curtis (1966) : A. D. Curtis
- David Curtis (1990) : D. M. Curtis
- Ian Curtis (1980–1982) : I. J. Curtis
- Wilfred Curwen (1906) : W. J. H. Curwen
- Vincent Cushing (1971–1973) : V. G. B. Cushing
- John Cuthbertson (1962–1963) : J. L. Cuthbertson

== D ==
- Edward D'Aeth (1885) : E. K. H. D'Aeth
- Stephen Daley (2003–2005) : S. R. Daley
- Ronald Primrose, Lord Dalmeny (1930) : Lord Dalmeny
- John Dalrymple (1978) : J. J. H. Dalrymple
- Jamie Dalrymple (2001–2003) : J. W. M. Dalrymple
- Simon Dalrymple (2002–2004) : S. H. Dalrymple
- Edward Daniell (1835–1837) : E. T. Daniell
- Rupert Daniels (1965–1966) : R. C. Daniels
- Benjamin Darbyshire (1864–1866) : B. S. Darbyshire
- Robert Darling (1902–1903) : R. S. Darling
- Nicholas Darnell (1837–1840) : N. Darnell
- John Darwall-Smith (1933–1934) : J. A. Darwall-Smith
- Randle Darwall-Smith (1935–1938) : R. F. H. Darwall-Smith
- Thomas Dashwood (1899) : T. H. K. Dashwood
- Edmund Daubeny (1860–1863) : E. T. Daubeney
- Henry Daubeney (1834–1837) : H. W. B. Daubeney
- Maurice Dauglish (1889–1890) : M. J. Dauglish
- Edward Davenport (1864–1866) : E. Davenport
- William Davidson (1947–1948) : W. W. Davidson
- Henry Davies (1990–1992) : H. R. Davies
- Joe Davies (2012–2014) : J. M. Davies
- Philip Davies (1913–1914) : P. H. Davies
- William Davies (1846–1848) : W. H. Davies
- John Davis (1963) : F. J. Davis
- Michael Dawes (2016–2018) : M. J. Dawes
- Timothy Dawson (1986) : T. A. J. Dawson
- Reymond de Montmorency (1899) : R. H. de Montmorency
- Fredrick de Saram (1934–1935) : F. C. de Saram
- John de Silva (1924–1927) : J. A. de Silva
- Ryle de Soysa (1938–1939) : G. R. J. de Soysa
- Richard de Uphaugh (1919) : R. G. D. de Uphaugh
- John de Villiers (1951–1952) : J. O. de Villiers
- James Dean (1978) : P. J. Dean
- Peter Delisle (1954–1956) : G. P. S. Delisle
- Henry Denison (1829) : H. Denison
- Thomas Denne (1827) : T. Denne
- Christopher Denny (1985) : C. M. Denny
- Ernest Denny (1891) : E. W. Denny
- Henry des Voeux (1844) : H. D. des Voeux
- Kenelm Digby (1856–1859) : K. E. Digby
- Reginald Digby (1867–1869) : R. Digby
- Ted Dillon (1901–1902) : E. W. Dillon
- Lewis Dingle (2007–2010) : L. A. Dingle
- Buck Divecha (1948–1951) : R. V. Divecha
- Jei Diwakar (2019) : J. Diwakar
- Eric Dixon (1936–1939) : E. J. H. Dixon
- John Henry Dixon (1973) : J. H. Dixon
- David Docwra (1973–1974) : E. D. Docwra (Note: Born at Paddington in 1953, Docwra was educated at Canford School before going up to Worcester College, Oxford. In his only first-class appearance for the university he scored 26 runs. After graduating, Docwra became a teacher. He emigrated to Australia, where he taught for 37 years at St Peter's College, Adelaide. After his retirement in 2015, the college set up the David Docwra Scholarship in recognition of his long service.)
- John Dolignon (1834–1836) : J. W. Dolignon
- John Dolphin (1860) : J. M. Dolphin
- Peter Donald (1978) : P. C. G. Donald
- Thomas Donaldson (1906) : T. H. Donaldson
- William Donaldson (1894) : W. P. Donaldson
- Rory Donnellan (1963) : R. O. Donnellan
- Martin Donnelly (1946–1947) : M. P. Donnelly
- Graeme Doran (2004–2005) : G. P. Doran
- Andrew Douglas-Home (1970) : A. Douglas-Home
- Alan Dowding (1951–1953) : A. L. Dowding
- William Drake (1836) : W. Drake
- Colin Drybrough (1960–1962) : C. D. Drybrough
- Alfred Dryden (1841–1843) : A. E. Dryden
- Pierre du Preez (1996) : S. P. du Preez
- Alan Duff (1959–1961) : A. R. Duff
- Jacobus Duminy (1921) : J. P. Duminy
- Peter Dunbar (2006–2007) : P. R. Dunbar
- Tony Duncan (1935) : A. A. Duncan
- Lord Dunglass (1926) : Lord Dunglass
- Jack Dunning (1928) : J. A. Dunning
- Philip Durack (1980) : J. P. Durack
- Durell Durell (1838–1840) : J. D. Durell
- Theodore Dury (1875–1876) : T. S. Dury
- Alan Dyer (1965–1966) : A. W. Dyer
- Martin Dyson (1958–1960) : E. M. Dyson
- John Dyson (1933–1936) : J. H. Dyson

== E ==
- David Eadie (1998–1999) : D. J. Eadie
- Wilfred Eadon (1934) : W. M. Eadon
- Desmond Eagar (1938–1939) : E. D. R. Eagar
- Michael Eagar (1956–1959) : M. A. Eagar
- John Easter (1966–1968) : J. N. C. Easter
- Alexander Eccles (1896–1899) : A. Eccles
- Simon Ecclestone (1994) : S. C. Ecclestone
- Roger Edbrooke (1982–1984) : R. M. Edbrooke
- Rod Eddington (1975–1976) : R. I. Eddington
- Frederick Eden (1850) : F. Eden
- Frederick Morton Eden (1849–1851) : F. M. Eden
- Paddy Edwards (1987–1989) : P. G. Edwards
- John Eggar (1938) : J. D. Eggar
- Robin Eliot (1961) : R. F. Eliot
- Richard Ellis (1981–1983) : R. G. P. Ellis
- William Webb Ellis (1827) : W. W. Ellis
- Bruce Ellison (1993) : B. C. A. Ellison
- Richard Elviss (1966–1967) : R. W. Elviss
- Michael England (1938–1939) : R. M. England
- Dan Escott (2016–2018) : D. A. Escott
- Alfred Evans (1878–1881) : A. H. Evans
- John Evans (1909–1912) : A. J. Evans
- Noel Evans (1931–1933) : E. N. Evans
- Frederic Evans (1863–1865) : F. R. Evans
- Gwynn Evans (1938–1939) : G. Evans
- Paddy Evans (2002–2003) : P. P. Evans
- William Evans (1902–1905) : W. H. B. Evans
- Francis Evelyn (1880–1881) : F. L. Evelyn
- Julian Evetts (1933) : J. A. Evetts
- William Evetts (1868–1869) : W. Evetts
- Alan Ezekowitz (1980–1981) : R. A. B. Ezekowitz

== F ==
- Arthur Faber (1853–1855) : A. H. Faber
- Mark Faber (1970–1972) : M. J. J. Faber
- Frederick Fagge (1834–1842) : J. F. Fagge
- James Faithfull (1839) : J. G. Faithfull
- Frederick Fane (1896–1898) : F. L. Fane
- Matthew Fanning (2018–2019) : M. J. Fanning
- Michael Farebrother (1939) : M. H. Farebrother
- John Farmer (1958) : J. J. S. Farmer
- Farooq Azeem (1962–1963) : Farooq Azeem
- Percy Farrant (1890) : P. R. Farrant
- David Fasken (cricketer) (1953–1955) : D. K. Fasken
- Leslie Fawcus (1925–1926) : C. L. D. Fawcus
- Edward Fellowes (1865–1868) : E. L. Fellowes
- Walter Fellows (1854–1857) : W. Fellows
- Jonathan Fellows-Smith (1953–1955) : J. P. Fellows-Smith
- Stuart Ferguson (1998) : S. H. Ferguson
- Nicholas Ferraby (2014) : N. J. Ferraby
- George Field (1893) : G. Field
- Wingfield Fiennes (1856–1858) : W. S. T. W. Fiennes
- Ted Fillary (1963–1965) : E. W. J. Fillary
- Anthony Fincham (1976) : A. L. R. Fincham
- William Findlay (1901–1903) : W. Findlay
- John Firth (1919–1920) : J. D. E. Firth
- Tim Firth (1987) : T. Firth
- Charles Dennis Fisher (1899–1900) : C. D. Fisher
- Paul Fisher (1974–1978) : P. B. Fisher
- Thomas Fitton (1932) : T. E. J. Fitton
- Geoffrey Fletcher (1939) : G. E. Fletcher
- Matt Floyd (2001) : M. K. Floyd
- John Floyer (1832) : J. Floyer
- Ethan Fogarty (2014) : E. J. Fogarty
- Edmond Foljambe (1912) : E. W. S. Foljambe
- George Foljambe (1879) : G. S. Foljambe
- John Foord-Kelcey (1883) : J. Foord-Kelcey
- William Foord-Kelcey (1874–1875) : W. Foord-Kelcey
- Dudley Forbes (1894–1895) : D. H. Forbes
- George Ford (1837–1840) : G. J. Ford
- Neville Ford (1928–1930) : N. M. Ford
- George Forrester (1912–1913) : G. D. Forrester
- Henry Forster (1886–1889) : H. W. Forster
- Arthur Fortescue (1868–1871) : A. T. Fortescue
- Richard Fortin (1963) : R. C. G. Fortin
- David Foster (1980) : D. C. G. Foster
- Freddie Foster (2019) : F. J. H. Foster
- Geoffrey Foster (1905–1908) : G. N. Foster
- Harry Foster (1894–1896) : H. K. Foster
- Peter Foster (1936–1938) : P. G. Foster
- R. E. Foster (1897–1900) : R. E. Foster
- Edward Fowler (1993) : E. R. Fowler
- Gerald Fowler (1888–1889) : G. Fowler
- Howard Fowler (1877–1880) : H. Fowler
- Dan Fox (2004–2005) : D. R. Fox
- Raymond Fox (1896–1898) : R. W. Fox
- Charles Francis (1870–1873) : C. K. Francis
- Henry Franklin (1921–1924) : H. W. F. Franklin
- Guy Franks (1983–1985) : J. G. Franks
- Neville Fraser (1912–1914) : J. N. Fraser
- Charles Frazer (1927–1928) : C. E. Frazer
- John Frazer (1924) : J. E. Frazer
- John Frederick (1864–1867) : J. S. Frederick
- Clinton Free (2003) : C. W. Free
- James Freeling (1844) : J. R. Freeling
- Tom Froggett (2007–2008) : T. J. Froggett
- Patrick Frost (1961) : P. D. Frost
- Charles Fry (1959–1961) : C. A. Fry
- C. B. Fry (1892–1895) : C. B. Fry
- George Fuller (1854–1855) : G. P. Fuller
- James Fulton (1997–1999) : J. A. G. Fulton
- David Fursdon (1973–1975) : E. D. Fursdon
- Alan Fyffe (1906) : A. H. Fyffe

== G ==
- Shivajirao Gaekwad (1911–1913) : S. Gaekwad
- Jason Gallian (1992–1993) : J. E. R. Gallian
- Neil Gamble (1967) : N. W. Gamble
- William Game (1873–1876) : W. H. Game
- Nick Gandon (1979) : N. J. C. Gandon
- Peter Gardiner-Hill (1949) : P. F. Gardiner-Hill
- Ross Garland (1998–2000) : R. Garland
- Monty Garland-Wells (1927–1930) : H. M. Garland-Wells
- Charles Garnett (1860–1862) : C. A. Garnett
- Frederick Garnett (1840) : F. W. Garnett
- William Garnett (1839) : W. B. Garnett
- Edward Garnier (1871–1873) : E. S. Garnier
- John Garnier (1832) : J. Garnier
- Thomas Garnier (1832) : T. Garnier
- Thomas Garnier (1861–1863) : T. P. Garnier
- Alan Garofall (1966–1968) : A. R. Garofall
- Edward Garrow (1839) : E. W. Garrow
- Richard Garth (1839–1844) : R. Garth
- Peter Garthwaite (1929–1930) : P. F. Garthwaite
- Gilbert Gauntlett (1957) : G. B. Gauntlett
- Darren Gerard (2006) : D. C. Gerard
- Phil Gerrans (1990–1991) : P. S. Gerrans
- Russel Gibaut (1983) : R. P. Gibaut
- John Gibbon (1868–1869) : J. H. Gibbon
- Peter Gibbs (1964–1966) : P. J. K. Gibbs
- Ian Gibson (1955–1958) : I. Gibson
- George Giffard (1834–1836) : G. M. Giffard
- Humphrey Gilbert (1907–1909) : H. A. Gilbert
- Andrew Gilfillan (1982) : A. D. Gilfillan
- Hugh Gillett (1857–1858) : H. H. Gillett
- Ivor Gilliat (1922–1925) : I. A. W. Gilliat
- Richard Gilliat (1964–1967) : R. M. C. Gilliat
- Frank Gilligan (1919–1920) : F. W. Gilligan
- George Gilroy (1909) : G. B. Gilroy
- Reginald Glennie (1886) : R. G. Glennie
- Trevor Glover (1973–1975) : T. R. Glover
- Jamie Gnodde (2015–2018) : J. S. D. Gnodde
- Charles Godfrey (1882–1885) : C. J. M. Godfrey
- Alan Gofton (1999–2001) : A. F. Gofton
- Frederick Goldstein (1966–1969) : F. S. Goldstein
- Guy Goodliffe (1904) : G. V. Goodliffe
- John Gordon (1906–1907) : J. H. Gordon
- Rupert Gordon-Walker (1981) : R. A. Gordon-Walker
- Charles Goring (1836–1838) : C. Goring
- Edward Goschen (1868–1869) : W. E. Goschen
- Cecil Gosling (1929–1930) : C. H. Gosling
- Peter Gracey (1947–1948) : P. B. K. Gracey
- Clifford Grainge (1950–1952) : C. M. Grainge
- Geoffrey Grasett (1912) : G. W. Grasett
- Roger Gray (1947) : R. I. Gray
- David Green (1959–1961) : D. M. Green
- Neil Green (1988) : N. H. Green
- Alan Greene (1877–1880) : A. D. Greene
- Weir Greenlees (1904) : W. L. G. Greenlees
- John Greenstock (1925–1927) : J. W. Greenstock
- Leonard Greenwood (1919) : L. W. Greenwood
- Geoffrey Greig (1920) : G. G. F. Greig
- Francis Gresson (1887–1890) : F. H. Gresson
- Charles Grieve (1936) : C. F. Grieve
- Edward Grimston (1834–1837) : E. H. Grimston
- Robert Grimston (1838–1840) : R. Grimston
- John Grover (1936–1938) : J. N. Grover
- Mike Groves (1963–1966) : M. G. M. Groves
- Melville Guest (1964–1966) : M. R. J. Guest
- John Guise (1923–1925) : J. L. Guise
- Gul Khan (1996) : Gul Khan
- Pearkes Gundry (1859) : J. P. F. Gundry
- Chinmay Gupte (1991–1996) : C. M. Gupte
- David Gurr (1976–1977) : D. R. Gurr
- George Gutteres (1881) : G. G. Gutteres
- John Guy (1938–1939) : J. B. Guy

== H ==
- Walter Hadow (1869–1872) : W. H. Hadow
- David Hagan (1985–1991) : D. A. Hagan
- Thomas Hale (1851–1852) : T. W. Hale
- Richard Hales (1840) : R. C. Hales
- Patrick Hall (1919) : P. M. Hall
- John Halliday (1934–1937) : J. G. Halliday
- Simon Halliday (1980–1982) : S. J. Halliday
- Bryan Hamblin (1971–1973) : C. B. Hamblin
- Andrew Hamilton (1975–1976) : A. C. Hamilton
- William Hamilton (1882) : W. D. Hamilton
- Anthony Hampton (1987–1989) : A. N. S. Hampton
- Octavius Hanbury (1849–1850) : O. Hanbury
- Kenneth Hands (1912) : K. C. M. Hands
- Reginald Hankey (1853–1855) : R. Hankey
- Charles Hannay (1901) : C. S. Hannay
- William Harbord (1930) : W. E. Harbord
- Arthur Harcourt (1947) : A. B. Harcourt
- Hardit Malik (1921) : Hardit Malik
- John Hare (1879–1880) : J. H. M. Hare
- Peter Hare (1947) : P. M. C. Hare
- Charles Harenc (1832–1834) : C. J. Harenc
- George Hargrave (2019) : G. T. Hargrave
- Christopher Harris (1964–1965) : C. R. Harris
- Lord Harris (1871–1874) : Lord Harris
- Dominic Harrison (1983–1985) : D. S. Harrison
- George Harrison (1880–1883) : G. C. Harrison
- Jack Harrison (2017) : J. Harrison
- Martin Hart (1951) : M. D. Hart
- Thomas Hart (1931–1932) : T. M. Hart
- John Hartley (1895–1897) : J. C. Hartley
- Charles Harvey (1857–1859) : C. M. Harvey
- Peter Harvey (1946–1949) : P. V. Harvey
- Algernon Haskett-Smith (1877–1879) : A. Haskett-Smith
- Eric Hatfeild (1907–1909) : C. E. Hatfeild
- Stephen Hawinkels (2001–2004) : S. J. Hawinkels
- Christopher Hawke (1953) : C. R. J. Hawke
- David Hay (1936–1938) : D. O. Hay
- Kevin Hayes (1981–1984) : K. A. Hayes
- John Haygarth (1862–1864) : J. W. Haygarth
- James Haynes (1996–1997) : J. E. Haynes
- David Hayward (1939) : D. R. Hayward
- Cecil Headlam (1895) : C. Headlam
- Michael Heal (1969–1972) : M. G. Heal
- William Heale (1881) : W. H. Heale
- Hartley Heard (1967–1970) : H. Heard
- Arthur Heath (1876–1879) : A. H. Heath
- John Heathcoat-Amory (1914) : J. Heathcoat-Amory
- Ludovic Heathcoat-Amory (1902–1903) : L. Heathcoat-Amory
- Lionel Hedges (1920–1923) : L. P. Hedges
- Derek Henderson (1949–1950) : D. Henderson
- Iain Henderson (1987–1990) : I. M. Henderson
- Thomas Henderson (1897) : T. B. Henderson
- Francis Henley (1903–1905) : F. A. H. Henley
- David Henley-Welch (1946–1948) : D. F. Henley-Welch
- Nicolas Heppel (1988) : N. Heppel
- Mervyn Herbert (1902–1904) : M. R. H. M. Herbert
- Edmund Herring (1913) : E. F. Herring
- Phillip Heseltine (1983) : P. J. Heseltine
- Edmund Hester (1989) : E. D. Hester
- Edward Hewetson (1922–1925) : E. P. Hewetson
- Herbie Hewett (1886–1887) : H. T. Hewett
- Simon Hewitt (1984) : S. M. Hewitt
- Robert Heywood (2016) : R. A. Heywood
- Andrew Hichens (1957–1959) : A. L. Hichens
- Charles Hickley (1883) : C. L. Hickley
- Tom Hicks (1999–2002) : T. C. Hicks
- Justin Higgo (1989) : J. B. Higgo
- Paul Higham (2011) : P. S. Higham
- Thomas Higson (1892) : T. A. Higson senior
- Henry Hildyard (1843–1846) : H. C. T. Hildyard
- Horatio Hildyard (1832) : H. S. Hildyard
- Lyonel Hildyard (1884–1887) : L. D. Hildyard
- Barrington Hill (1935–1937) : B. J. W. Hill
- Charlie Hill (2007–2009) : C. M. M. Hill
- Frederick Hill (1867–1870) : F. H. Hill
- Vernon Hill (1891–1893) : V. T. Hill
- Bob Hiller (1966) : R. Hiller
- Charles Hill-Wood (1928–1930) : C. K. H. Hill-Wood
- Denis Hill-Wood (1928) : D. J. C. H. Hill-Wood
- Nick Hillyard (2006) : N. J. Hillyard
- Trevitt Hine-Haycock (1881–1884) : T. R. Hine-Haycock
- Edward Hirst (1877–1880) : E. T. Hirst
- Henry Hoare (1865–1866) : H. W. Hoare
- Mike Hobbiss (2006–2007) : M. H. Hobbiss
- John Hobbs (1956–1958) : J. A. D. Hobbs
- George Langton Hodgkinson (1857–1860) : G. L. Hodgkinson
- Murray Hofmeyr (1949–1951) : M. B. Hofmeyr
- R. L. Holdsworth (1919–1922) : R. L. Holdsworth
- Herbert Hollings (1877) : H. J. B. Hollings
- Arthur Hollins (1899–1900) : A. M. Hollins
- Chris Hollins (1994) : C. J. Hollins
- Frank Hollins (1900–1901) : F. H. Hollins
- Henry Holloway (1836) : H. Holloway
- Errol Holmes (1925–1927) : E. R. T. Holmes
- Brian Hone (1931–1933) : B. W. Hone
- David Hone (1970) : D. J. Hone
- Robert Honywood (1845–1847) : R. Honywood
- John Hood (1977) : J. A. Hood
- Charles Hooman (1907–1910) : C. V. L. Hooman
- Herbert Hopkins (1921–1923) : H. O. Hopkins
- Alexander Hore (1851) : A. H. Hore
- James Horlick (1906–1907) : J. N. Horlick
- Gerald Hornby (1882) : G. F. Hornby
- Charles Horner (1877–1880) : C. E. Horner
- Rupert Horsley (1927) : R. H. Horsley
- Alexander Hosie (1913) : A. L. Hosie
- Worthington Hoskin (1907) : W. W. Hoskin
- Miles Howell (1914–1919) : M. Howell
- Tom Howell (2007–2008) : T. H. Howell
- Gurth Hoyer-Millar (1952) : G. C. Hoyer Millar
- Gideon Hudson (1964) : G. D. Hudson
- Roger Hudson (1997) : R. D. Hudson
- George Hughes (1845) : G. E. Hughes
- Matthew Hughes (2015–2018) : M. S. T. Hughes
- Thomas Hughes (1842) : T. Hughes
- Walter Hughes (1947) : W. L. Hughes
- Edward Hume (1861–1863) : E. Hume
- Francis Humphrys (1899–1900) : F. H. Humphrys
- Christopher Hurst (1906–1909) : C. S. Hurst
- Edmund Hurst (1843) : E. Hurst
- John Hurst (1843) : J. Hurst
- Richard Hurst (1843) : R. Hurst
- Peter Huxford (1980–1981) : P. N. Huxford
- Oliver Huyshe (1907) : O. F. Huyshe

== I ==
- Imran Khan (1973–1975) : Imran Khan
- Francis Inge (1861–1863) : F. G. Inge
- William Inge (1853) : W. Inge
- Will Inge (1930) : W. W. Inge
- Arthur Irvin (1868–1871) : A. J. E. Irvin
- Francis Isherwood (1872) : F. W. R. Isherwood
- Michael Ivey (1949–1951) : A. M. Ivey

== J ==
- Trevor Jack (1988) : T. B. Jack
- Geoffrey Jackson (1914) : G. L. Jackson
- Kenneth Jackson (1934–1935) : K. L. T. Jackson
- Roger Jackson (1962) : R. F. Jackson
- Robert Jackson (1989) : R. M. Jackson
- Tony Jakobson (1960–1961) : T. R. Jakobson
- Douglas Jardine (1920–1923) : D. R. Jardine
- Malcolm Jardine (1889–1892) : M. R. Jardine
- David Jarrett (1974–1975) : D. W. Jarrett
- Michael Jarrett (1995–1996) : M. E. D. Jarrett
- Javed Burki (1958–1960) : Javed Burki
- Ben Jeffery (2011–2013) : B. A. Jeffery
- Michael Jeh (1992–1993) : M. P. W. Jeh
- Hector Jelf (1938) : H. G. Jelf
- Frederick Jellicoe (1877–1880) : F. G. G. Jellicoe
- Vivian Jenkins (1933) : V. G. J. Jenkins
- William Jervis (1848) : W. M. Jervis
- Robert Jesson (1908) : R. W. F. Jesson
- Anthony Jessup (1950–1951) : A. Jessup
- Robin Johns (1970) : R. L. Johns
- Frederick Johnson (2012) : F. F. J. Johnson
- Peter Johnson (1971) : P. M. Johnson
- Donald Johnston (1914) : D. C. Johnston
- Henry Jollye (1862) : H. C. Jollye
- Keith Jones (1971–1973) : A. K. C. Jones
- Christopher Jones (1991) : C. D. P. Jones
- Alan Jones (1951–1952) : F. A. Jones
- Morgan Jones (1849–1850) : M. Jones
- Owain Jones (2012–2016) : O. J. Jones
- Peter Jones (1971–1972) : P. C. H. Jones
- Richard Jones (1890–1892) : R. T. Jones
- Thomas Babington Jones (1874) : T. B. Jones
- Rowland Jones-Bateman (1846–1848) : R. L. Jones-Bateman
- Henry Jones-Davies (1932) : H. M. O. Jones-Davies
- Tony Jose (1950–1951) : A. D. Jose
- David Jowett (1952–1955) : D. C. P. R. Jowett
- Richard Jowett (1957–1960) : R. L. Jowett
- William Joynson (1939) : W. R. H. Joynson
- Henry Joynt (1952–1953) : H. W. Joynt

== K ==
- Wilfrid Kalaugher (1928–1931) : W. G. Kalaugher
- Antony Kamm (1952–1955) : A. Kamm
- Donald Kayum (1977–1978) : D. A. Kayum
- Robert William Keate (1834–1837) : R. W. Keate
- George Keay (1919–1920) : G. A. Keay
- Michael Keeling (1948–1949) : M. E. A. Keeling
- Christopher Keey (1992–1993) : C. L. Keey
- Geoffrey Keighley (1947–1948) : W. G. Keighley
- Gus Kelly (1901–1902) : G. W. F. B. Kelly
- Charles Kemp (1878) : C. W. M. Kemp
- Manley Kemp (1881–1884) : M. C. Kemp
- William Kendall (1994–1996) : W. S. Kendall
- Gus Kennedy (2013–2014) : A. D. J. Kennedy
- Edward Kenney (1865–1868) : E. M. Kenney
- Esmond Kentish (1956) : E. S. M. Kentish
- Richard Ker (1841–1842) : R. J. C. R. Ker
- Kingsmill Key (1884–1887) : K. J. Key
- John Kilbee (1968–1969) : J. R. Kilbee
- Michael Kilborn (1986–1990) : M. J. Kilborn
- Roger Kimpton (1935–1938) : R. C. M. Kimpton
- Stephen Kimpton (1935) : S. M. Kimpton
- Charles King (1852) : C. W. King
- Daniel King (2009–2010) : D. A. King
- Patrick Kingsley (1928–1930) : P. G. T. Kingsley
- Roderick Kinkead-Weekes (1972) : R. C. Kinkead-Weekes
- Dean Kino (1999) : D. Kino
- John Kirby (1956) : J. E. W. Kirby
- John Kitson (1838) : J. F. Kitson
- Willem Klopper (2009) : W. A. Klopper
- Henry Knatchbull (1827–1832) : H. E. Knatchbull
- Donald Knight (1914–1919) : D. J. Knight
- John Knight (1978–1981) : J. M. Knight
- Norman Knight (1933–1935) : N. S. Knight
- Robert Knight (1878–1880) : R. L. Knight
- John Knott (1922–1924) : C. H. Knott
- Freddie Knott (1911–1914) : F. H. Knott
- Frank Knox (1899–1901) : F. P. Knox
- Neil Kruger (2008–2010) : N. Kruger
- John Kumleben (1956–1957) : J. M. Kumleben

== L ==
- Ronald Lagden (1909–1912) : R. O. Lagden
- Tim Lamb (1973–1974) : T. M. Lamb
- C. G. Lane (1856–1860) : C. G. Lane
- Thomas Lang (1874–1875) : T. W. Lang
- Geoffrey Latham (1907) : G. C. Latham
- Nigel Laughton (1997) : N. E. F. Laughton
- Alexander Law (1855–1857) : A. P. Law
- John Law (1949) : J. A. G. C. Law
- William Law (1871–1874) : W. Law
- Mark Lawrence (1982–1986) : M. P. Lawrence
- Walter Lawrence (1954) : W. N. M. Lawrence
- Percy Lawrie (1922–1924) : P. E. Lawrie
- Philip Le Couteur (1909–1911) : P. R. le Couteur
- Francis Lear (1843–1844) : F. Lear
- Arthur Lee (1868–1871) : A. G. Lee
- Arthur Lee (1934–1935) : A. M. Lee
- Edward Lee (1897–1900) : E. C. Lee
- Godfrey Lee (1837–1839) : G. B. Lee
- Richard Lee (1972–1974) : R. J. Lee
- Andrew Leech (1972) : A. D. Leech
- Robin Lees (1970) : R. D. Lees
- Charles Leese (1908–1910) : C. P. Leese
- Antony Legard (1932–1935) : A. R. Legard
- Geoffrey Legge (1925–1926) : G. B. Legge
- Edward Chandos Leigh (1852–1854) : E. C. Leigh
- Bryan Leighton (2018) B. J. Leighton
- Charles Leslie (1881–1883) : C. F. H. Leslie
- Charles Leslie (1841) : C. P. Leslie
- John Leslie (1836) : J. Leslie
- John Leslie (1843) : J. Leslie
- John Leslie (1908) : J. Leslie
- Michael L'Estrange (1977–1979) : M. G. L'Estrange
- Frederick Leveson Gower (1891–1894) : F. A. G. Leveson-Gower
- H. D. G. Leveson Gower (1893–1896) : H. D. G. Leveson-Gower
- Charles Lewis (1876) : C. P. Lewis
- David Lewis (1949–1951) : D. J. Lewis
- Reginald Lewis (1949–1950) : R. C. V. Lewis
- Richard Lewis (1894–1896) : R. P. Lewis
- William Lewis (1827) : W. H. Lewis
- Charles Lightfoot (1996–1998) : C. G. R. Lightfoot
- William Lindsay (1929–1932) : W. O. Lindsay
- Herbert Linnell (1929–1932) : H. J. Linnell
- Henry Linton (1858–1859) : H. Linton
- Sydney Linton (1861–1863) : S. Linton
- William Lipscomb (1868) : W. H. Lipscomb
- Kenelm Lister-Kaye (1912) : K. A. Lister-Kaye
- William Lithgow (1939) : W. S. P. Lithgow
- Charles Little (1890–1892) : C. W. Little
- Willie Llewelyn (1890–1891) : W. D. Llewelyn
- John Lloyd (1866) : J. M. E. Lloyd
- Martyn Lloyd (1974–1975) : M. F. D. Lloyd
- Charles Loch (1845–1848) : C. R. F. Loch
- Douglas Lockhart (1998) : D. R. Lockhart
- Jonathon Lodwick (2010) : J. A. Lodwick
- Lord Henry Loftus (1841–1842) : H. Y. A. Loftus
- John Lomas (1938–1939) : J. M. Lomas
- Francis Longe (1851–1854) : F. D. Longe
- Andrew Longmore (1973–1975) : A. N. M. Longmore
- Reginald Lord (1924–1925) : R. A. Lord
- Wilfrid Lord (1911–1913) : W. F. Lord
- James Lorimer (1883) : J. Lorimer
- James Louw (1999) : J. H. Louw
- Geoff Lovell (1991–1993) : G. B. T. Lovell
- John Lowe (1907–1910) : J. C. M. Lowe
- Richard Lowndes (1841) : R. Lowndes
- Geoffrey Lowndes (1921) : W. G. L. F. Lowndes
- Alfred Lowth (1837–1841) : A. J. Lowth
- Christopher Lubbock (1939) : C. W. S. Lubbock
- Richard Luddington (1982) : R. S. Luddington
- Peter Lunn (1989–1990) : P. D. Lunn
- Richard Luyt (1938) : R. E. Luyt
- Archibald Lyle (1904–1906) : A. M. P. Lyle
- Bev Lyon (1922–1923) : B. H. Lyon
- Gordon Lyon (1925–1927) : G. W. F. Lyon
- Herbert Lyon (1887–1890) : H. Lyon
- Craig Lyons (1993) : C. W. J. Lyons

== M ==
- James Macadam (2007) : J. C. Macadam
- René MacColl (1924) : R. MacColl
- Robert Macdonald (1991–1993) : R. H. Macdonald
- David Macindoe (1937–1946) : D. H. Macindoe
- Charles Mackenzie (1876) : C. K. MacKenzie
- Mark Mackenzie (1910) : M. K. Mackenzie
- Andrew MacLachlan (1962) : A. MacLachlan
- Norman MacLachlan (1879–1882) : N. MacLachlan
- Patrick MacLarnon (1985–1986) : P. C. MacLarnon
- Alasdair Maclay (1993–1996) : A. W. Maclay
- Greg Macmillan (1993–1995) : G. I. Macmillan
- Moray Macpherson (1980) : M. C. L. Macpherson
- Angus MacRobert (1995) : A. D. MacRobert
- Michael Magill (1938) : M. D. P. Magill
- Bill Maidlow (1972) : W. J. Maidlow
- William Fuller-Maitland (1864–1867) : W. F. Maitland
- Henry Majendie (1860) : H. W. Majendie
- Nick Majendie (1961–1963) : N. L. Majendie
- Hasnain Malik (1992–1996) : H. S. Malik
- Charles Mallam (1882) : C. G. C. Mallam
- Tony Mallett (1947–1948) : A. W. H. Mallett
- Nick Mallett (1980–1981) : N. V. H. Mallett
- Maurice Manasseh (1962–1964) : M. Manasseh
- Earl of March (1837) : Earl of March
- Walter Marcon (1843–1844) : W. Marcon
- Gregory Marie (1978–1979) : G. V. Marie
- Vic Marks (1975–1978) : V. J. Marks
- Charles Marriott (1870–1871) : C. Marriott
- George Marriott (1878) : G. S. Marriott
- Jonathan Marsden (2013–2017) : J. Marsden
- Robert Marsden (1979–1982) : R. Marsden
- Eric Marsh (1962) : E. Marsh
- David Marshall (1957) : D. A. C. Marshall
- Hugh Marshall (1966) : H. D. F. Marshall
- John Marshall (1951–1953) : J. C. Marshall
- Algernon Marsham (1939) : A. J. B. Marsham
- C. D. B. Marsham (1854–1858) : C. D. B. Marsham
- C. H. B. Marsham (1900–1902) : C. H. B. Marsham
- Charles Marsham (1851–1852) : C. J. B. Marsham
- Robert Marsham (1854–1856) : R. H. B. Marsham
- Geoffrey Marsland (1953–1954) : G. P. Marsland
- Evelyn Martin (1903–1906) : E. G. Martin
- John Martin (1962–1965) : J. D. Martin
- Neil Martin (1994–1995) : N. F. C. Martin
- Henry Martyn (1899–1900) : H. Martyn
- Andrew Mason (1963–1965) : A. L. Mason
- David Mather (1995–2000) : D. P. Mather
- John Matheson (1977) : J. A. Matheson
- Ernest Mathews (1867–1869) : E. Mathews
- Leslie Mathews (1897) : L. H. S. Mathews
- Michael Mathews (1957) : M. J. A. Mathews
- Michael Matthews (1934–1937) : M. H. Matthews
- John Maude (1873) : J. Maude
- Ron Maudsley (1946–1947) : R. H. Maudsley
- Barry May (1970–1972) : B. May
- John Mayhew (1929–1931) : J. F. N. Mayhew
- Henry Mayne (1834–1838) : H. B. Mayne
- Walter McBride (1925–1928) : W. N. McBride
- Maurice McCanlis (1925–1928) : M. A. McCanlis
- Norman McCaskie (1932) : N. McCaskie
- John McGrady (1990) : J. E. McGrady
- James McInerny (1955–1956) : J. J. McInerny
- Robert McIntosh (1927–1929) : R. I. F. McIntosh
- Colin McIver (1903–1904) : C. D. McIver
- Brendan McKerchar (2008–2009) : B. T. McKerchar
- Gordon McKinna (1951–1953) : G. H. McKinna
- Leslie McLean (1939) : L. E. McLean
- Paul McMahon (2003–2005) : P. J. McMahon
- Angus McPhail (1977) : A. W. McPhail
- Nicholas Meadows (2010) : N. A. Meadows
- Walter Medlicott (1901–1902) : W. S. Medlicott
- Adrian Mee (1984–1987) : A. A. G. Mee
- Basil Melle (1913–1914) : B. G. V. Melle
- Alan Melville (1930–1933) : A. Melville
- Christopher Melville (1956–1957) : C. D. M. Melville
- Colin Melville (1928) : C. M. Melville
- Stanley Metcalfe (1954–1956) : S. G. Metcalfe
- Cecil Middleton (1933) : C. Middleton
- Robert Miles (1867–1869) : R. F. Miles
- Neil Millar (2000–2003) : N. Millar
- David Millard (1965) : D. E. S. Millard
- David Millener (1969–1970) : D. J. Millener
- Andrew Miller (1982–1985) : A. J. T. Miller
- Barrington Mills (1841–1843) : B. S. T. Mills
- Robert Minns (1962–1963) : R. E. F. Minns
- Frank Mitchell (1898) : F. H. Mitchell
- Mike Mitchell (1862–1865) : R. A. H. Mitchell
- Richard Mitchell (1935) : R. W. G. L. Mitchell
- Bill Mitchell (1951–1953) : W. M. Mitchell
- Mandy Mitchell-Innes (1934–1937) : N. S. Mitchell-Innes
- Munna Mitra (1974–1975) : A. Mitra
- Henry Moberly (1842–1845) : H. E. Moberly
- William Moberly (1870–1872) : W. O. Moberly
- John Mocatta (1958) : J. E. A. Mocatta
- David Moeller (1961) : D. Moeller
- George Molineux (1907) : G. K. Molineux
- Jason Molins (1998) : J. A. M. Molins
- David Money (1947) : D. C. Money
- Robert Monro (1860) : R. W. Monro
- Richard Montgomerie (1991–1994) : R. R. Montgomerie
- David Moor (1956) : D. C. Moor
- Denis Moore (1930–1931) : D. N. Moore
- Robert Moore (1834–1835) : R. Moore
- Gerald Mordaunt (1893–1896) : G. J. Mordaunt
- Richard More (1898–1901) : R. E. More
- Andrew Morgan (1966–1969) : A. H. Morgan
- Peter Morgan (1997) : P. G. Morgan
- Philip Morgan (1946) : P. R. L. Morgan
- John Morley (1859–1860) : J. W. Morley
- Elliot Morres (1850–1851) : E. J. Morres senior
- Hugh Morres (1898–1899) : H. F. M. Morres
- Nicholas Morrill (1978–1979) : N. D. Morrill
- James Morris (1991) : J. G. Morris
- Russell Morris (1987–1991) : R. E. Morris
- Edward Morse (2005–2008) : E. J. Morse
- Edward Moss (1933–1934) : E. H. Moss
- Reginald Moss (1887–1890) : R. H. Moss
- Thomas Lloyd-Mostyn (1849) : T. E. M. L. Mostyn
- Roger Moulding (1978–1983) : R. P. Moulding
- Peter Mountford (1962–1963) : P. N. G. Mountford
- Peter Mucklow (1970) : P. Mucklow
- Michael Munday (2003–2006) : M. K. Munday
- John Shannon Munn (1900–1901) : J. S. Munn
- Hector Munro (1947) : H. C. Munro
- Michael Munro (1989) : M. J. Munro
- Bill Murray-Wood (1936–1938) : W. Murray-Wood
- William Musters (1829) : W. M. C. Musters
- Sachin Mylavarapu (2013–2015) : S. V. S. Mylavarapu

== N ==
- Charles Napier (1838–1839) : C. W. A. Napier
- Ronald Napier (1956) : R. S. Napier
- Philip Nash (1928) : P. G. E. Nash
- Frank Naumann (1912–1919) : F. C. G. Naumann
- Matthew Naylor (2017–2018) : M. A. Naylor
- Francis Neate (1960–1962) : F. W. Neate
- Patrick Neate (1966) : P. W. Neate
- Charles Nepean (1870–1873) : C. E. B. Nepean
- Evan Nepean (1887–1888) : E. A. Nepean
- Vivian Neser (1919–1921) : V. H. Neser
- Henry Nethercote (1839–1841) : H. O. Nethercote
- John Nevinson (1930–1931) : J. H. Nevinson
- George Newman (1926–1927) : G. C. Newman
- Arthur Newton (1885) : A. E. Newton
- Ossie Newton-Thompson (1946) : J. O. Newton-Thompson
- Benjamin Nicholls (1884–1885) : B. E. Nicholls
- John Nicolson (1923) : J. F. W. Nicolson
- Robert Niven (1968–1973) : R. A. Niven
- Oswald Norris (1904–1905) : O. T. Norris
- Simon Northcote-Green (1974–1979) : S. R. Northcote-Green
- Ian Norton (1959) : I. D. Norton
- John Nunn (1926–1928) : J. A. Nunn
- John Nuttall (1987–1989) : J. D. Nuttall

== O ==
- Charles Oakeley (1848) : C. W. A. Oakeley
- Salil Oberoi (2005–2006) : S. Oberoi
- Tim O'Brien (1884–1885) : T. C. O'Brien
- Joe O'Gorman (2014) : T. J. J. O'Gorman
- Richard O'Grady (2014–2015) : R. J. O'Grady
- Peter Oldfield (1931–1933) : P. C. Oldfield
- Ralph Oliphant-Callum (1992–1993) : R. D. Oliphant-Callum
- Frederick Oliver (1854–1857) : F. W. Oliver
- Jonathan Oppenheimer (1989–1991) : J. M. E. Oppenheimer
- Jonathan Orders (1978–1981) : J. O. D. Orders
- Augustus Orlebar (1845) : A. Orlebar
- Denis Oswald (1931) : D. G. Oswald
- Cuthbert Ottaway (1870–1873) : C. J. Ottaway
- Tuppy Owen-Smith (1931–1933) : H. G. O. Owen-Smith

== P ==
- Arthur Page (1899) : A. Page
- Herbert Page (1883–1886) : H. V. Page
- Lionel Palairet (1890–1893) : L. C. H. Palairet
- Richard Palairet (1891–1894) : R. C. N. Palairet
- John Papillon (1827) : J. Papillon
- Charles Parker (1998) : C. R. C. Parker
- Joseph Parker (1996–1998) : J. T. Parker
- William Parker (1852–1856) : W. W. Parker
- Gopalaswami Parthasarathi (1933–1935) : G. Parthasarathi
- Brian Partridge (1977) : B. J. M. Partridge
- Dan Pascoe (2009–2012) : D. C. Pascoe
- Iftikhar Ali Khan Pataudi (1928–1931) : I. A. K. Pataudi
- Mansoor Ali Khan Pataudi (1960–1963) : M. A. K. Pataudi
- Chetan Patel (1997) : C. M. Patel
- Tikendra Patel (1985–1986) : T. Patel
- Gajan Pathmanathan (1975–1978) : G. Pathmanathan
- Mark Patten (1922–1923) : M. Patten
- John Patterson (1882) : J. I. Patterson
- William Patterson (1878–1881) : W. H. Patterson
- John Patteson (1849) : J. C. Patteson
- Bernard Pauncefote (1868–1871) : B. Pauncefote
- Roland Paver (1972–1974) : R. G. L. Paver
- Arthur Pawson (1903) : A. C. Pawson
- Guy Pawson (1908–1911) : A. G. Pawson
- Tony Pawson (1947–1948) : H. A. Pawson
- Arthur Payne (1854–1856) : A. F. Payne
- Alfred Payne (1852–1856) : A. Payne
- Cecil Payne (1906–1907) : C. A. L. Payne
- Robert Payne (1832) : R. A. Payne
- Edward Peake (1880–1883) : E. Peake
- Jonathan Pearce (1978–1979) : J. P. Pearce
- Vyvyan Pearse (1919) : G. V. Pearse
- Alexander Pearson (1876–1879) : A. G. Pearson
- Robert Pearson (1894) : R. B. Pearson
- Thomas Pearson (1872–1874) : T. S. Pearson
- Charles Peat (1913) : C. U. Peat
- Ian Peebles (1930) : I. A. R. Peebles
- Bertram Peel (1903) : B. L. Peel
- Denis Peel (1906–1907) : D. H. Peel
- Herbert Richard Peel (1851–1852) : H. R. Peel
- Sidney Pelham (1871–1872) : S. Pelham
- Ralph Pemberton (1885) : R. H. Pemberton
- Thomas Penny (1951–1952) : T. S. Penny
- John Pepys (1861) : J. A. Pepys
- John Percival (1922) : J. D. Percival
- William Pershke (1938) : W. J. Pershke
- Michael Petchey (1983–1984) : M. D. Petchey
- Stewart Pether (1939) : S. Pether
- David Pettit (1958–1959) : D. W. Pettit
- Toby Pettman (2017–2019) T. H. S. Pettman
- David Pfaff (1991) : D. B. Pfaff
- George Philips (1853) : G. H. Philips
- Hylton Philipson (1887–1889) : H. Philipson
- Alan Phillips (1953–1954) : A. G. Phillips
- Frank Phillips (1892–1895) : F. A. Phillips
- John Phillips (1955–1957) : J. B. Phillips
- Dan Piachaud (1958–1962) : J. D. Piachaud
- Francis Pickering (1873) : F. P. U. Pickering
- James Pickup (1973–1975) : J. K. Pickup
- Charles Pilkington (1896) : C. C. Pilkington
- Charles Pilkington (1858) : C. H. Pilkington
- Hubert Pilkington (1899–1900) : H. C. Pilkington
- W. Pilkington (1827) : W. Pilkington
- Francis Pipe-Wolferstan (1846–1847) : F. S. Pipe-Wolferstan
- Nicholas Pirihi (1997–1999) : N. G. Pirihi
- David Pithey (1960–1962) : D. B. Pithey
- Edward Pole (1827–1832) : E. Pole
- David Polkinghorne (1988) : D. A. Polkinghorne
- Poole (1842) : Poole
- Francis Popham (1829–1832) : F. L. Popham
- Simon Porter (1971–1973) : S. R. Porter
- Ian Potter (1960–1962) : I. C. Potter
- Henry Potts (1949–1950) : H. J. Potts
- Jamie Powe (2018) : J. D. Powe
- Christopher Prentice (1974) : C. N. R. Prentice
- David Price (1975–1978) : D. H. Price
- Frederic Price (1860–1863) : F. R. Price
- Leo Price (1920–1922) : H. L. Price
- Rice Price (1827–1838) : R. Price
- Vincent Price (1919–1922) : V. R. Price
- Jack Pritchard (1919) : J. M. Pritchard
- George Prothero (1839) : G. Prothero
- Bill Proud (1939) : R. B. Proud
- Anthony Puckridge (1963) : A. Puckridge
- Cecil Pullan (1932–1933) : C. D. A. Pullan
- William Pulman (1874–1875) : W. W. Pulman
- James Pycroft (1835–1838) : J. Pycroft

== Q ==
- Jeremy Quinlan (1985–1986) : J. D. Quinlan
- James Quinton (1895–1896) : J. M. Quinton

== R ==
- Alex Rackow (2017–2019) : A. J. W. Rackow
- Douglas Raikes (1931) : D. C. G. Raikes
- George Raikes (1893–1896) : G. B. Raikes
- Thomas Raikes (1922–1925) : T. B. Raikes
- Bernard Randolph (1855–1857) : B. M. Randolph
- Cyril Randolph (1844–1847) : C. Randolph
- John Randolph (1842–1844) : J. Randolph
- Leveson Randolph (1845) : L. C. Randolph
- Robert Ranken (1860–1861) : R. B. Ranken
- John Raphael (1903–1905) : J. E. Raphael
- Jonathan Rashleigh (1841–1842) : J. Rashleigh
- William Rashleigh (1886–1889) : W. Rashleigh
- Peter Raspin (1973) : P. H. Raspin
- George Rawlinson (1836–1839) : G. Rawlinson
- Harry Rawlinson (1982–1984) : H. T. Rawlinson
- John Rawlinson (1887) : J. B. Rawlinson
- John Rawlinson (1979–1980) : J. L. Rawlinson
- John Raybould (1957–1959) : J. G. Raybould
- Kenneth Raynor (1906–1909) : K. Raynor
- Tim Razzall (1964) : E. T. Razzall
- Henry Reade (1861–1862) : H. S. Reade
- James Redmayne (2000–2002) : J. R. S. Redmayne
- Courtenay Reece (1925) : C. W. Reece
- Robert Reid, 1st Earl Loreburn (1865–1868) : R. T. Reid
- Alan Reynolds (1900) : A. B. Reynolds
- Giles Reynolds (1988–1989) : G. D. Reynolds
- Reginald Rice (1892–1894) : R. W. Rice
- Henry Rich (1838) : H. G. W. Rich
- Oliver Richards (2011) : O. B. Richards
- James Richardson (1924–1926) : J. V. Richardson
- Thomas Richardson (1927) : T. G. Richardson
- Bruce Lyttelton Richmond (1892) : B. L. Richmond
- George Ricketts (1887) : G. W. Ricketts
- Justin Ricketts (1995) : J. D. Ricketts
- Arthur Ridding (1846–1850) : A. Ridding
- Charles Ridding (1845–1849) : C. H. Ridding
- William Ridding (1849–1853) : W. Ridding
- Stuart Ridge (1981–1982) : S. P. Ridge
- Andrew Ridley (1994–1996) : A. C. Ridley
- Arthur Ridley (1872–1875) : A. W. Ridley
- Christopher Ridley (1971) : C. J. B. Ridley
- Giles Ridley (1965–1968) : G. N. S. Ridley
- Michael Ridley (1967–1970) : R. M. Ridley
- Septimus Ridsdale (1862) : S. O. B. Ridsdale
- David Rix (1964) : D. W. Rix
- George Robertson (1866) : G. P. Robertson
- John Robertson (1829) : J. C. Robertson
- R. C. Robertson-Glasgow (1920–1923) : R. C. Robertson-Glasgow
- George Robinson (1970–1971) : G. A. Robinson
- George Robinson (1881–1883) : G. E. Robinson
- Basil Robinson (1947–1948) : H. B. O. Robinson
- Roy Robinson (1908–1909) : R. L. Robinson
- John Rogers (1932) : J. H. Rogers
- James Rogers (1979–1981) : J. J. Rogers
- Jack Rogers (2018–2019) : O. J. W. Rogers
- Jonathan Ross (1978–1980) : C. J. Ross
- James Round (1864) : J. Round
- Len Rowe (1958) : L. C. Rowe
- John Rowley (1927) : J. V. D. Rowley
- Vernon Royle (1875–1876) : V. P. F. A. Royle
- Gavin Roynon (1958) : G. D. Roynon
- Charles Rucker (1914) : C. E. S. Rucker
- Patrick Rucker (1919) : P. W. Rucker
- Robin Rudd (1949–1951) : C. R. D. Rudd
- Harold Goodeve Ruggles-Brise (1883) : H. G. Ruggles-Brise
- Jack Rumbold (1946–1947) : J. S. Rumbold
- David Russell (1959) : D. F. Russell
- Denis Russell (1930–1931) : D. L. Russell
- Henry Stuart Russell (1839) : H. S. Russell
- H. V. Russell (1832) : H. V. Russell
- Mark Russell (1990–1991) : M. J. Russell
- Richard Rutnagur (1985–1986) : R. S. Rutnagur
- Robert Rydon (1986–1987) : R. A. Rydon
- J. C. Ryle (1835–1838) : J. C. Ryle

== S ==
- Peter Sabine (1962–1963) : P. N. B. Sabine
- Oliver Sadler (2006–2008) : O. J. Sadler
- Abidine Sakande (2014–2015) : A. Sakande
- Dick Sale (1939–1946) : R. Sale junior
- Richard Sale (1909–1911) : R. Sale senior
- Salman Khan (1998–2001) : Salman Khan
- Malcolm Salter (1908–1910) : M. G. Salter
- Neil Salvi (1986–1987) : N. V. Salvi
- Oswald Samson (1902–1903) : O. M. Samson
- John Sanderson (1979–1980) : J. F. W. Sanderson
- Ernest Sandford (1859–1861) : E. G. Sandford
- John Sandford (1855–1856) : J. D. Sandford
- Temple Sandford (1900) : T. C. G. Sandford
- David Sandiford (1991–1992) : D. C. Sandiford
- Philip Sankey (1850–1852) : P. M. Sankey
- Rajdeep Sardesai (1987) : R. D. Sardesai
- Christopher Saunders (1964) : C. J. Saunders
- John Saunders (1966) : J. G. Saunders
- Richard Savage (1976–1978) : R. L. Savage
- James Henry Savory (1877–1878) : J. H. Savory
- David Sayer (1958–1960) : D. M. Sayer
- Joe Sayers (2002–2004) : J. J. Sayers
- Henry Schwann (1890) : H. S. Schwann
- John Scobell (1865–1867) : J. F. Scobell
- Alex Scott (2010–2012) : A. J. D. Scott
- Edward Scott (1938) : E. K. Scott
- Lord George Scott (1887–1889) : Lord G. W. Scott
- John Scott (1861–1863) : J. Scott
- Kenneth Scott (1935–1937) : K. B. Scott
- Michael Scott (1956–1957) : M. D. Scott
- Peter Scott (1932–1933) : P. M. R. Scott
- Robert Scott (1930–1931) : R. S. G. Scott
- Alex Scrini (1997–1998) : A. P. Scrini
- Arthur Sealy (1924) : A. J. E. Sealy
- Jake Seamer (1933–1936) : J. W. Seamer
- Andrew Searle (1988) : A. M. Searle
- Chris Searle (2019) : C. J. Searle
- Geoffrey Seaton (1957) : G. S. Seaton
- J. A. Seitz (1909) : J. A. Seitz
- Louis Serrurier (1925–1927) : L. R. Serrurier
- Walter Seton (1894) : W. J. Seton
- John Seton Karr (1837) : J. Seton Karr
- William Seymour (1837) : W. Seymour
- Avinash Sharma (2010) : A. S. Sharma
- Rajiv Sharma (2009–2012) : R. Sharma
- Graham Sharman (1958) : G. J. Sharman
- Edward Shaw (1912–1914) : E. A. Shaw
- Edward Shaw (1882–1883) : E. D. Shaw
- Kenneth Shearwood (1949–1951) : K. A. Shearwood
- Richard Shore (1962) : R. G. Shore
- Gervaise Sibthorp (1834–1836) : G. T. W. Sibthorp
- William Sime (1931) : W. A. Sime
- Edward Simpson (1888) : E. T. B. Simpson
- Erroll Sinclair (1924) : E. H. L. G. Sinclair
- Sandy Singleton (1934–1937) : A. P. Singleton
- Kenneth Siviter (1974–1977) : K. Siviter
- Steven Skala (1979) : S. M. Skala
- Challen Skeet (1919–1920) : C. H. L. Skeet
- Robert Skene (1928–1930) : R. W. Skene
- Francis Slaven (1955) : F. F. Slaven
- Alastair Smail (1983) : A. H. K. Smail
- Richard Smalley (1999–2001) : R. G. Smalley
- Alan Smith (1958–1960) : A. C. Smith
- Colin Smith (1958) : C. M. Smith
- Edward Smith (1876) : E. P. Smith
- Ernest Smith (1888–1891) : E. Smith
- G. O. Smith (1893–1896) : G. O. Smith
- M. J. K. Smith (1954–1956) : M. J. K. Smith
- Peter Smith (1967) : P. B. Smith
- Villiers Smith (1844–1848) : V. S. C. Smith
- Walter Smith (1920) : W. F. S. Smith
- Philip Snow (1928–1929) : P. S. Snow
- Arthur Snowden (1905) : A. O. Snowden
- Stephen Soames (1846–1850) : S. Soames
- George Solly (1877) : G. E. Solly
- James Souter (1948) : J. S. Souter
- Charles Spencer (1923–1924) : C. R. Spencer
- Orlando Spencer-Smith (1866) : O. Spencer-Smith
- Thomas Spinks (1840) : T. Spinks
- Philip Spray (1967–1968) : P. H. Spray
- Bob Stainton (1932–1934) : R. G. Stainton
- Michael Stallibrass (1972–1974) : M. J. D. Stallibrass
- John Stanning junior (1939) : J. Stanning junior
- R. T. Stanyforth (1914) : R. T. Stanyforth
- Christopher Stearn (2005–2006) : C. P. Stearn
- Felix Stephens (1966–1967) : J. P. R. F. Stephens
- John Stephenson (1923–1926) : J. S. Stephenson
- Greville Stevens (1920–1923) : G. T. S. Stevens
- Brian Stevens (1962) : K. B. H. Stevens
- Alexander Stewart (1883) : A. L. Stewart
- William Stewart (1869–1870) : W. A. Stewart
- Philip Stewart-Brown (1924–1926) : P. H. Stewart-Brown
- Francis Stocks (1896–1899) : F. W. Stocks
- Richard Storer (1972) : R. E. D. Storer
- Alastair Storie (1992) : A. C. Storie
- Vincent Stow (1904) : V. A. S. Stow
- Jonty Strachan (2008–2009) : J. P. Strachan
- John Stratton (1896) : J. W. Stratton
- Thomas Stubbs (1877) : T. W. Stubbs
- Amit Suman (2004–2005) : A. K. Suman
- John Surridge (1956) : J. G. C. Surridge
- Iain Sutcliffe (1994–1996) : I. J. Sutcliffe
- Simon Sutcliffe (1980–1981) : S. P. Sutcliffe
- Michael Sutton (1946–1947) : M. A. Sutton
- Christopher Sutton-Mattocks (1972–1973) : C. J. Sutton-Mattocks
- Ben Swanson (2017–2019) B. Swanson
- Malcolm Sygrove (1986–1988) : M. R. Sygrove
- Francis Symes-Thompson (1898) : F. Symes-Thompson

== T ==
- Henry Taberer (1891–1892) : H. M. Taberer
- Neville Talbot (1907) : N. S. Talbot
- John Tanner (1947–1949) : J. D. P. Tanner
- Henry Taswell (1851) : H. Taswell
- Chris Tavaré (1975–1977) : C. J. Tavaré
- Claude Taylor (1923–1926) : C. H. Taylor
- Darren Taylor (1985–1986) : D. P. Taylor
- Nick Taylor (2017) : N. P. Taylor
- S. Taylor (1848) : S. Taylor
- Timothy Taylor (1981–1982) : T. J. Taylor
- Arthur Teape (1863–1866) : A. S. Teape
- Hugh Teesdale (1908) : H. Teesdale
- Anthony Tew (1928) : A. M. Tew
- John Tew (1927) : J. E. Tew
- Peter Thackeray (1974) : P. R. Thackeray
- Frederic Thesiger (1888–1891) : F. J. N. Thesiger
- Rhodri Thomas (1963–1965) : R. J. A. Thomas
- Neil Thompson (1961) : N. P. Thompson
- Russell Thomson (1996) : R. B. Thomson
- David Thorne (1984–1986) : D. A. Thorne
- Walter Thornton (1879–1882) : W. A. Thornton
- Christopher Timm (1989) : C. W. Timm
- Richard Tindall (1933–1934) : R. G. Tindall
- David Toft (1965–1967) : D. P. Toft
- Giles Toogood (1982–1989) : G. J. Toogood
- Chris Tooley (1984–1987) : C. D. M. Tooley
- Robin Topham (1976) : R. D. N. Topham
- Henry Torre (1839–1842) : H. J. Torre
- Chris Townsend (1992–1995) : C. J. Townsend
- David Townsend (1933–1934) : D. C. H. Townsend
- Jonathan Townsend (1964–1965) : J. R. A. Townsend
- Peter Townsend (1929) : P. N. Townsend
- Richard Townsend (1850) : R. B. Townsend
- William Townsend (1842–1843) : W. H. Townsend
- William Townshend (1870–1872) : W. Townshend
- James Traill (1848–1849) : J. C. Traill
- William Traill (1858–1860) : W. F. Traill
- Basil Travers (1946–1948) : B. H. Travers
- Robert Trevelyan (1990) : R. W. D. Trevelyan
- John Trevett (1962) : J. C. P. Trevett
- Arthur Trevor (1878–1881) : A. H. Trevor
- Patrick Trimby (1993–1994) : P. W. Trimby
- Henry Tristram (1883) : H. B. Tristram
- Edward Tritton (1864–1867) : E. W. Tritton
- Charles Trower (1838–1840) : C. F. Trower
- Frank Tuff (1910–1911) : F. N. Tuff
- Jonathan Turnbull (1983–1984) : J. R. Turnbull
- Frederick Harding Turner (1909) : F. H. Turner
- John Turner (1836–1837) : J. Turner
- Richard Twining (1910–1913) : R. H. Twining
- Edward Tylecote (1869–1872) : E. F. S. Tylecote
- Henry Tylecote (1874–1877) : H. G. Tylecote

== U ==
- Robin Udal (1904–1906) : N. R. Udal
- Amit Upadhyay (2004) : A. M. Upadhyay

== V ==
- Pieter van der Bijl (1931–1932) : P. G. V. van der Bijl
- Willem van der Merwe (1990) : W. M. van der Merwe
- Anthony van Ryneveld (1947) : A. J. van Ryneveld
- Clive van Ryneveld (1948–1950) : C. B. van Ryneveld
- George Vance (1835–1838) : G. Vance
- Jonathan Varey (1982–1983) : J. G. Varey
- Henry Veitch (1854–1856) : H. G. J. Veitch
- Rowland Venables (1866–1869) : R. G. Venables
- Stuart Verity (1969–1970) : S. A. Verity
- John Vidler (1910–1912) : J. L. S. Vidler
- Adolph von Ernsthausen (1901–1904) : A. C. E. von Ernsthausen
- Benjamin Vonwiller (2002) : B. M. von Willer
- Richard Voss (1901–1903) : R. Z. H. Voss
- Stirling Voules (1863–1866) : S. C. Voules

== W ==
- Bernard Waddy (1932) : B. B. Waddy
- Stacy Waddy (1896–1897) : P. S. Waddy
- Mark Wagh (1996–1998) : M. A. Wagh
- Michael Wagstaffe (1972) : M. C. Wagstaffe
- Frederic Waldock (1919–1920) : F. A. Waldock
- Michael Walford (1935–1938) : M. M. Walford
- David Walker (1933–1935) : D. F. Walker
- James Walker (1880–1883) : J. G. Walker
- Russell Walker (1861–1865) : R. D. Walker
- Alexander Wallace (1850–1851) : A. Wallace
- Guy Waller (1973–1974) : G. D. Waller
- Edward Wallington (1875–1877) : E. W. Wallington
- Conrad Wallroth (1872–1874) : C. A. Wallroth
- David Walsh (1966–1969) : D. R. Walsh
- Aubrey Walshe (1953–1956) : A. P. Walshe
- Arthur Fraser Walter (1866–1869) : A. F. Walter
- Percy Melmoth Walters (1885) : P. M. Walters
- Chris Walton (1955–1957) : A. C. Walton
- David Warburton (1939) : D. Warburton
- Arnold Ward (1899) : A. S. Ward
- Charles Ward (1858–1860) : C. B. Ward
- Humphrey Ward (1919–1921) : H. P. Ward
- John Ward (1970–1973) : J. M. Ward
- Lord Ward (1838–1842) : Lord Ward
- John Ware (1886) : J. H. Ware
- Simon Warley (1991–1992) : S. N. Warley
- Charles Warner (1962) : C. S. Warner
- Pelham Warner (1894–1896) : P. F. Warner
- Antony Warr (1933–1934) : A. L. Warr
- Charlie Warren (2001–2002) : C. C. M. Warren
- Robin Waters (1960–1962) : R. H. C. Waters
- Alexander Watson (1965–1968) : A. G. M. Watson
- Arthur Watson (1886–1889) : A. K. Watson
- David Watson (1939) : D. J. F. Watson
- Harold Watson (1919) : H. B. Watson
- Hubert Watson (1891–1892) : H. D. Watson
- Matt Watson (2009–2010) : M. J. C. Watson
- Thomas Watson (1933–1935) : T. M. Watson
- Lawrence Watts (1957–1958) : L. D. Watts
- Brian Waud (1857–1860) : B. W. Waud
- Simon Weale (1986–1990) : S. D. Weale
- Francis Weatherby (1904) : F. Weatherby
- Hubert Webb (1946–1948) : H. E. Webb
- Herbert Webb (1935) : H. G. Webb
- John Webb (1938) : J. K. G. Webb
- A. J. Webbe (1875–1878) : A. J. Webbe
- Herbert Webbe (1876–1879) : H. R. Webbe
- Scott Weenink (2000) : S. W. Weenink
- Thomas Welch (1926–1928) : T. B. G. Welch
- Evelyn Wellings (1928–1931) : E. M. Wellings
- Richard Wells (1976–1978) : R. R. C. Wells
- Richard West (1936–1937) : R. West
- Sam Westaway (2011–2016) : S. A. Westaway
- Roger Westley (1969) : R. B. Westley
- Stuart Westley (1968–1969) : S. A. Westley
- Louis Wharton (1920) : L. E. Wharton
- Ellis Whately (1902–1905) : E. G. Whately
- Garth Wheatley (1946–1946) : G. A. Wheatley
- Robin Whetherly (1937–1938) : R. E. Whetherly
- Richard Whiley (1958) : R. K. Whiley
- Hugh Whitby (1884–1887) : H. O. Whitby
- Philip Arthur Whitcombe (1947–1949) : P. A. Whitcombe
- Philip John Whitcombe (1950–1952) : P. J. Whitcombe
- Reginald White (1913–1914) : R. S. M. White
- Peter Whitehouse (1936–1938) : P. M. W. Whitehouse
- Algernon Whiting (1881–1882) : A. O. Whiting
- Charles Whittle (1947) : C. J. R. Whittle
- Archie Wickham (1876–1878) : A. P. Wickham
- William Wickham (1844) : W. F. Wickham
- Denis Wigan (1913–1914) : D. G. Wigan
- John Wiley (1949–1951) : J. W. E. Wiley
- William Wiley (1952) : W. G. A. Wiley
- Donald Wilkinson (1975–1976) : D. J. Wilkinson
- Alexander Wilkinson (1913–1914) : W. A. C. Wilkinson
- Edmund Willes (1851–1854) : E. H. L. Willes
- Ben Williams (2011–2013) : B. Williams
- Charles Williams (1952–1955) : C. C. P. Williams
- David Williams (1968–1973) : D. Williams
- Derek Williams (1946) : C. D. Williams
- John Williams (1931) : J. S. Williams
- Philip Williams (1844–1847) : P. Williams
- Ralph Williams (1899–1902) : R. A. Williams
- Tom Williams (2013–2014) : T. J. Williams
- Archibald Williamson (1913) : A. C. Williamson
- Charles Willis (1847–1850) : C. F. Willis
- Arthur Willmer (1912) : A. F. Willmer
- Alfred Wilson (1848–1850) : A. Wilson
- Claude Wilson (1881) : C. W. Wilson
- Billy Wilson (1888–1891) : G. L. Wilson
- John Wilson (1977) : J. D. Wilson
- Peter Wilson (1964) : P. J. Wilson
- Peter Wilson (1968–1970) : P. R. B. Wilson
- Robert Wilson (1956–1957) : R. W. Wilson
- Theophilus Wilson (1892–1893) : T. S. B. Wilson
- Angus Winchester (1990) : A. L. C. Winchester
- Jason Windsor (1995) : J. M. Windsor
- Andrew Wingfield Digby (1971–1977) : A. R. Wingfield Digby
- Christopher Winn (1948–1951) : C. E. Winn
- Matt Winter (2013–2016) : M. J. Winter
- Percival Winterbotham (1903–1904) : J. P. Winterbotham
- James Wiseman (1836) : J. M. Wiseman
- James Wolfe Murray (1957) : J. A. Wolfe-Murray
- Richard Wollocombe (1951–1952) : R. H. Wollocombe
- Benjamin Wood (1991–1992) : B. S. Wood
- Geoffrey Wood (1912) : G. D. Wood
- John Wood (1891–1893) : J. B. Wood
- Roy Woodcock (1956–1958) : R. G. Woodcock
- Nicholas Woods (2005–2007) : N. J. Woods
- Kenneth Woodward (1896) : K. A. Woodward
- Stephen Wookey (1978–1980) : S. M. Wookey
- Charles Wordsworth (1827–1832) : C. Wordsworth
- Arthur Worsley (1903–1906) : A. E. Worsley
- Duncan Worsley (1961–1964) : D. R. Worsley
- George Worthington (1844) : G. Worthington
- Tom Wortley (2001) : T. H. Wortley
- Anthony Wreford-Brown (1934) : A. J. Wreford-Brown
- Charles Wreford-Brown (1886–1889) : C. Wreford-Brown
- Peter Wreghitt (1951) : P. H. Wreghitt
- Edward Wright (1897–1899) : E. C. Wright
- Egerton Wright (1905–1908) : E. L. Wright
- Frank Wright (1829–1838) : F. B. Wright
- Frank Wright (1863–1865) : F. W. Wright
- Gavin Wright (1995–1997) : G. J. Wright
- Malcolm Wright (1950) : M. G. Wright
- Michael Wrigley (1948–1950) : M. H. Wrigley
- Alex Wyatt (2002–2004) : A. A. Wyatt
- Halifax Wyatt (1850–1851) : M. T. H. Wyatt
- William Wyatt (1862–1864) : W. Wyatt
- Hugh Wyld (1900–1903) : H. J. Wyld
- John Wynne (1838–1840) : J. H. G. Wynne
- Charles Wynne (1835–1838) : C. Wynne-Finch

== Y ==
- Richard Yeabsley (1993–1995) : R. S. Yeabsley
- Charles Duke Yonge (1836) : C. D. Yonge
- Gerald Yonge (1844–1850) : G. E. Yonge
- Douglas Young (1938–1939) : D. E. Young
- Charles Younger (1907) : C. F. Younger

== Bibliography ==
- Birley, Derek (1999). A Social History of English Cricket. London: Aurum Press. ISBN 978-18-54107-10-7 – via Internet Archive.
- Carlaw, Derek (2020). Kent County Cricketers, A to Z: Part One (1806–1914) (PDF). Cardiff: ACS.
- Lewis, Paul (2014). For Kent and Country. Eastbourne: Reveille Press. ISBN 978-19-08336-63-7.
