= Richard Wild (cricketer) =

English cricketer

Personal information
- Full name: Richard David Wild
- Born: 23 May 1973 (age 53); Barnsley, Yorkshire, England
- Batting: Right-handed
- Bowling: Right-arm fast-medium

Domestic team information
- Years: Team
- 1996: Northamptonshire

Career statistics
Competition	First-class
Matches	1
Runs scored	–
Batting average	–
100s/50s	–/–
Top score	–
Balls bowled	84
Wickets	1
Bowling average	62.00
5 wickets in innings	0
10 wickets in match	0
Best bowling	1/62
Catches/stumpings	0/–
- Source: Cricinfo, 31 August 2011

Richard David Wild (born 23 May 1973) is a former English cricketer. Wild was a right-handed batsman who bowled right-arm fast-medium. He was born in Barnsley, Yorkshire.

Wild made a single first-class appearance for Northamptonshire against Oxford University in 1996. In this match he took a single wicket, that of Hasnain Malik for the cost of 62 runs from 14 overs. He wasn't called upon to bat.
