= Jeremy Attfield =

English cricketer (born 1972)

Personal information
- Full name: Jeremy Mark Attfield
- Born: 5 March 1972 (age 54); Kettering, Northamptonshire
- Source: Cricinfo, 18 March 2017

Jeremy Attfield (born 5 March 1972) is an English first-class cricketer. He played in six matches for Oxford University Cricket Club in 1995.

== See also ==
- List of Oxford University Cricket Club players
