= Thomas Ashwell (cricketer) =

English cricketer (1897–1969)

Personal information
- Full name: Thomas Geoffrey Lyon Ashwell
- Born: 18 July 1897; Nottingham
- Died: 21 December 1969 (aged 72); Chelsea, London
- Source: Cricinfo, 18 March 2017

Thomas Ashwell MC (18 July 1897 – 21 December 1969) was an English cricketer. He played one first-class match for Oxford University Cricket Club in 1919.

Ashwell was educated at Rugby School, then joined the army during World War I. He was an officer in the Rifle Brigade. In 1917 he was awarded the MC:

For conspicuous gallantry and devotion to duty in an attack. He led his company forward with magnificent determination, and was the first to enter the enemy trench, overcoming all opposition. During the following day he set his men a splendid example of coolness and courage during a heavy bombardment and threatened enemy counter-attack.

After the war he went up to Brasenose College, Oxford.

== See also ==
- List of Oxford University Cricket Club players
