= Philip Armstrong =

English cricketer (born 1962)

Personal information
- Full name: Philip Alexander Nikolas Armstrong
- Born: 23 January 1962 (age 64); Lambeth, London
- Source: Cricinfo, 18 March 2017

Philip Armstrong (born 23 January 1962) is an English cricketer. He played in one match for Oxford University Cricket Club in 1982.

== See also ==
- List of Oxford University Cricket Club players
