= Robert Austin (Oxford University cricketer) =

English cricketer

Personal information
- Full name: Robert Gordon Lefroy Austin
- Born: 28 December 1871; Cheltenham, Gloucestershire, England
- Died: 26 May 1958 (aged 86); Stellenbosch, Cape Province, South Africa
- Source: Cricinfo, 18 March 2017

Robert Austin (28 December 1871 – 26 May 1958) was an English cricketer. He played one first-class match for Oxford University Cricket Club in 1894. He was educated at Cheltenham College and Oriel College, Oxford. He became a schoolteacher in England, then moved to South Africa and was headmaster of Parktown Preparatory School in Johannesburg.

== See also ==
- List of Oxford University Cricket Club players
