= David Ashworth (cricketer) =

English cricketer (born 1944)

Personal information
- Full name: David Anthony Ashworth
- Born: 18 July 1944 (age 82); Rani, Rajasthan, India
- Batting: Right-handed
- Bowling: Right arm off-break

Domestic team information
- Years: Team
- 1966–1967: Oxford University
- Source: ESPNcricinfo, 18 March 2017

David Anthony Ashworth (born 18 July 1944) is an English former cricketer. He played seven first-class matches for Oxford University Cricket Club in 1966 and 1967.

Educated at Uppingham School, Ashworth made two Second XI appearances for Middlesex in 1963, before studying law at St Edmund Hall, Oxford. In May 1966 he scored 120 playing for Free Foresters against Oxford University, prompting the university to give him a first-class debut against Middlesex a day later. He made three appearances over the following fortnight and the following April played three further matches against county sides. In his penultimate game he recorded his only first-class fifty in making 67 against Surrey.

Ashworth played for Uppingham Rovers in The Cricketer Cup from 1968 to 1993, this included captaining the side in the 1979 final against Old Tonbridgians and taking 8/42 with his off-spin against St Edward's Martyrs in 1991.

A keen golfer, he was Director of Richmond Golf Club from 2017 to 2023.

== See also ==
- List of Oxford University Cricket Club players
