= Peter Raspin =

English cricketer (born 1951)

Personal information
- Full name: Peter Hugh Raspin
- Born: 26 November 1951 (age 74); Farnworth, Lancashire, England
- Batting: Left-handed
- Bowling: Slow left-arm orthodox

Domestic team information
- Years: Team
- 1973: Oxford University

Career statistics
Competition	First-class
Matches	2
Runs scored	15
Batting average	15.00
100s/50s	–/–
Top score	10
Balls bowled	216
Wickets	3
Bowling average	39.00
5 wickets in innings	–
10 wickets in match	–
Best bowling	2/69
Catches/stumpings	–/–
- Source: Cricinfo, 18 June 2020

Peter Hugh Raspin (born 26 November 1951) is an English former first-class cricketer.

Raspin was born in November 1951 at Farnworth, Lancashire. He later studied at St Edmund Hall, Oxford. While studying at Oxford, he made three appearances in first-class cricket for Oxford University in 1973, against Surrey and Warwickshire. He scored 15 runs in his two matches, in addition to taking 3 wickets with his slow left-arm orthodox bowling.
