= Alex Scrini =

English cricketer (born 1976)

Personal information
- Full name: Alexander Philip Scrini
- Born: 18 November 1976 (age 49); Sheffield, Yorkshire, England
- Batting: Right-handed
- Role: Wicket-keeper

Domestic team information
- Years: Team
- 1997–1998: Oxford University

Career statistics
| Competition | First-class |
|---|---|
| Matches | 12 |
| Runs scored | 253 |
| Batting average | 21.08 |
| 100s/50s | –/1 |
| Top score | 58* |
| Catches/stumpings | 13/– |
- Source: Cricinfo, 14 April 2020

Alexander Philip Scrini (born 18 October 1976) is an English banker and former first-class cricketer.

Scrini was born at Sheffield in October 1976. He later studied at Hertford College at the University of Oxford. While studying at Oxford, he played first-class cricket for Oxford University, making his debut against Durham at Oxford in 1997. He played first-class cricket for Oxford until 1998, making twelve appearances. Playing as a wicket-keeper, he scored a total of 253 runs in this twelve matches, at an average of 21.08 and with a high score of 58 not out. Behind the stumps, he took 13 catches.

After graduating from Oxford, Scrini moved into the financial industry and is currently employed by Morgan Stanley.
