= Ernest Mathews =

English cricketer and barrister

Personal information
- Full name: Ernest Mathews
- Born: 17 May 1847; Islington, London, England
- Died: 25 November 1930 (aged 83); Amersham, Buckinghamshire, England
- Batting: Right-handed
- Bowling: Right-arm roundarm slow

Domestic team information
- Years: Team
- 1867–1869: Oxford University

Career statistics
Competition	First-class
Matches	11
Runs scored	179
Batting average	9.94
100s/50s	–/–
Top score	44
Balls bowled	387
Wickets	7
Bowling average	23.85
5 wickets in innings	–
10 wickets in match	–
Best bowling	3/57
Catches/stumpings	9/–
- Source: Cricinfo, 26 March 2020

Ernest Mathews JP (17 May 1847 – 25 November 1930) was an English first-class cricketer and barrister.

The son of John Hubbersty Mathews, he was born at Islington in May 1847. He was educated at Harrow School, before going up to Brasenose College, Oxford. While studying at Oxford, he played first-class cricket for Oxford University, making his debut against the Marylebone Cricket Club at Lord's in 1867. He played first-class cricket for Oxford until 1869, making eleven appearances. He scored a total of 179 run in his eleven matches, with a high score of 44. With his right-arm roundarm slow bowling, he took 7 wickets with best figures of 3 for 57.

After graduating from Oxford, Mathews became a barrister. He was called to the bar as a member of Lincoln's Inn in November 1871. He later served as a justice of the peace for both Middlesex and Buckinghamshire. Mathews died at Amersham in November 1930.
