= Timothy Dawson =

English cricketer (born 1963)

Personal information
- Full name: Timothy Andrew John Dawson
- Born: 29 January 1963 (age 63); Münster, North Rhine-Westphalia, West Germany
- Batting: Right-handed
- Bowling: Right-arm off break

Domestic team information
- Years: Team
- 1986: Oxford University

Career statistics
Competition	First-class
Matches	7
Runs scored	32
Batting average	8.00
100s/50s	–/–
Top score	10*
Balls bowled	1,164
Wickets	13
Bowling average	49.92
5 wickets in innings	–
10 wickets in match	–
Best bowling	3/65
Catches/stumpings	2/–
- Source: Cricinfo, 26 February 2020

Timothy Andrew John Dawson (born 29 January 1963) is an English former first-class cricketer.

Dawson was born in West Germany at Münster in January 1963. He studied at the University of Oxford, where he played first-class cricket for Oxford University in 1986, making seven appearances. He scored 32 runs in his seven matches, in addition to taking 13 wickets with his off break bowling at an average of 49.92, with best figures of 3 for 65.
