= Neil Martin (cricketer, born 1969) =

English cricketer (born 1969)

Personal information
- Full name: Neil Frederick Clay Martin
- Born: 19 October 1969 (age 57); Birmingham, Warwickshire, England
- Batting: Right-handed
- Bowling: Right-arm medium

Domestic team information
- Years: Team
- 1994–1995: Oxford University

Career statistics
Competition	First-class
Matches	12
Runs scored	84
Batting average	7.63
100s/50s	–/–
Top score	26
Balls bowled	1,006
Wickets	8
Bowling average	75.37
5 wickets in innings	–
10 wickets in match	–
Best bowling	2/84
Catches/stumpings	5/–
- Source: Cricinfo, 27 April 2020

Neil Frederick Clay Martin (born 19 October 1969) is an English former first-class cricketer.

Martin was born at Birmingham, where he was educated at King Edward's School, and attended Durham University followed by Birmingham University. He later went up to Keble College, Oxford. While studying at Oxford, he played first-class cricket for Oxford University, making his debut against Durham at Oxford in 1994. He played first-class cricket for Oxford until 1995, making a total of twelve appearances. He scored 84 runs in his twelve matches, with a high score of 26, though his primary role in the Oxford side was a right-arm medium pace bowler. Martin struggled to take wickets against county opposition, with just 8 wickets at an expensive average of 75.37.
