= Michael Dawes =

English cricketer

Personal information
- Full name: Michael James Dawes
- Born: 23 February 1992 (age 34); Epsom, Surrey, England
- Batting: Right-handed
- Bowling: Right-arm medium

Domestic team information
- Years: Team
- 2016–2018: Oxford University

Career statistics
Competition	First-class
Matches	2
Runs scored	0
Batting average	–
100s/50s	–/–
Top score	0*
Balls bowled	456
Wickets	2
Bowling average	82.50
5 wickets in innings	–
10 wickets in match	–
Best bowling	1/6
Catches/stumpings	1/–
- Source: Cricinfo, 1 June 2020

Michael James Dawes (23 February 1992) is an English former first-class cricketer.

Michael Dawes was educated at City of London Freemen's School, before going up to Jesus College, Cambridge. From Cambridge, he studied for his PhD in economics at the University of Oxford. While studying at Oxford, he made two appearances in first-class cricket for Oxford University in The University Matches of 2016 and 2018 against Cambridge University. He took 2 wickets in these matches.
