= Roger Jackson (cricketer) =

English cricketer

Personal information
- Full name: Roger Frank Jackson
- Born: 5 January 1939 (age 87); Woolwich, Kent, England
- Batting: Right-handed
- Bowling: Right-arm fast

Domestic team information
- Years: Team
- 1962: Oxford University

Career statistics
Competition	First-class
Matches	2
Runs scored	8
Batting average	8.00
100s/50s	0/0
Top score	5*
Balls bowled	174
Wickets	0
Bowling average	–
5 wickets in innings	0
10 wickets in match	0
Best bowling	–
Catches/stumpings	0/–
- Source: Cricinfo, 1 April 2020

Roger Frank Jackson (born 5 January 1939) is an English former first-class cricketer.

Jackson was born at Woolwich in January 1939. He later studied at Hertford College, Oxford where he played first-class cricket for Oxford University in 1962, making two appearances at Oxford against Gloucestershire and Yorkshire. Playing as a right-arm fast bowler, he bowled a total of 29 overs across his two matches, but failed to take a wicket.
