= Tikendra Patel =

Indian cricketer (born 1965)

Personal information
- Full name: Tikendra Patel
- Born: 9 October 1965 (age 61); Ahmedabad, Gujarat, India
- Batting: Right-handed
- Bowling: Right-arm off break

Domestic team information
- Years: Team
- 1983–1985: Bedfordshire
- 1985–1986: Oxford University

Career statistics
Competition	First-class
Matches	15
Runs scored	222
Batting average	10.57
100s/50s	–/–
Top score	47
Balls bowled	12
Wickets	0
Bowling average	–
5 wickets in innings	–
10 wickets in match	–
Best bowling	–
Catches/stumpings	6/–
- Source: Cricinfo, 25 July 2019

Tikendra Patel (born 9 October 1965) is an Indian former first-class cricketer.

Patel was born at Ahmedabad, later attending Queen's College at the University of Oxford in England. While studying at Oxford, he made his debut in first-class cricket for Oxford University against Somerset at Oxford in 1985. He played first-class cricket for Oxford until the end of the 1986 season, making a total of fifteen appearances. He scored a total of 222 runs in his fifteen matches, at an average of 10.57 and a high score of 47. In addition to playing first-class cricket, Patel also played minor counties cricket for Bedfordshire from 1983–85, making four appearances in the Minor Counties Championship.
