= Mark Russell (cricketer) =

English cricketer (born 1970)

Personal information
- Full name: Mark John Russell
- Born: 18 November 1970 (age 55); Lincoln, Lincolnshire, England
- Nickname: _
- Batting: Right-handed
- Bowling: Right-arm medium

Domestic team information
- Years: Team
- 1990–1991: Oxford University

Career statistics
Competition	First-class
Matches	7
Runs scored	457
Batting average	65.29
100s/50s	0/5
Top score	84
Balls bowled	48
Wickets	4
Bowling average	7.75
5 wickets in innings	–
10 wickets in match	–
Best bowling	4/31
Catches/stumpings	1/–
- Source: Cricinfo, 22 June 2020

Mark John Russell (born 18 December 1970) is an English former first-class cricketer.

Russell was born at Lincoln in December 1970. He later studied at Pembroke College at the University of Oxford. While studying at Oxford, Russell played first-class cricket for Oxford University in 1990 and 1991, making seven appearances. Russell scored 457 runs in his seven matches at an average of 65.29, with a high score of 84. He took four wickets in his first-class career, all coming in a single innings against Kent in 1991, which was also his final first-class match.
