= Charles Cooper-Key =

English cricketer

Charles Aston Whinfield Cooper-Key (13 November 1856 – 13 July 1936) was an English cricketer active in 1877 who played for Oxford University. He was born in Hereford and died in Paddington. He appeared in one first-class match as a righthanded batsman who bowled right arm fast. He scored two runs with a highest score of 1 not out and took three wickets with a best performance of three for 8. His birth was registered as Charles Aston Winfield Key.
