= Craig Lyons (cricketer) =

South African cricketer and businessman

Personal information
- Full name: Craig Warwick John Lyons
- Born: 18 June 1970 (age 56); Johannesburg, Transvaal, South Africa
- Batting: Right-handed
- Role: Wicket-keeper
- Relatives: Russell Lyons (brother)

Domestic team information
- Years: Team
- 1993: Oxford University

Career statistics
Competition	First-class
Matches	9
Runs scored	108
Batting average	13.50
100s/50s	–/–
Top score	28
Catches/stumpings	22/2
- Source: Cricinfo, 23 May 2020

Craig Warwick John Lyons (born 18 June 1970) is a South African businessman and former first-class cricketer.

Lyons was born at Johannesburg in June 1970. He later studied at the University of the Witwatersrand, before studying in England at Keble College at the University of Oxford, where he majored in economics. While studying at Oxford, he played first-class cricket for Oxford University in 1993, making nine appearances, Playing as a wicket-keeper, he scored a total of 108 run with a high score of 28, while behind the stumps he took 22 catches and made two stumpings. After graduating from Oxford, he returned to South Africa where he currently the non-executive independent director of Huge Group Ltd. His brother, Russell, also played first-class cricket.
