= Pierre du Preez =

South African cricketer (born 1969)

Personal information
- Full name: Stanley Pierre du Preez
- Born: 1 January 1969 (age 57); Port Elizabeth, Cape Province, South Africa
- Batting: Right-handed
- Bowling: Left-arm medium-fast

Domestic team information
- Years: Team
- 1996: Oxford University

Career statistics
Competition	First-class
Matches	10
Runs scored	10
Batting average	10.00
100s/50s	–/–
Top score	9
Balls bowled	1,008
Wickets	5
Bowling average	126.80
5 wickets in innings	–
10 wickets in match	–
Best bowling	2/44
Catches/stumpings	3/–
- Source: Cricinfo, 31 May 2020

Stanley Pierre du Preez (born 1 January 1969) is a South African former first-class cricketer.

du Preez was born at Port Elizabeth in January 1969. He later studied in England as a Rhodes Scholar at Magdalen College, Oxford. While studying at Oxford, he played first-class cricket for Oxford University in 1996, making ten appearances. Playing as a left-arm medium-fast bowler, he took 5 wickets from 168 overs at the high average of 126.80, with best figures of 2 for 44. du Preez had the honour of taking the first wicket to fall in the 1996 English cricket season. In addition to playing cricket for Oxford, du Preez also represented the university in rugby union.
