= Rory Donnellan =

South African cricketer (1941–1977)

Personal information
- Full name: Rory Owen Donnellan
- Born: 20 June 1941; Durban, Natal, South Africa
- Died: 15 January 1977 (aged 35); Drakensberg, South Africa
- Batting: Right-handed

Domestic team information
- Years: Team
- 1963: Oxford University

Career statistics
Competition	First-class
Matches	5
Runs scored	173
Batting average	17.30
100s/50s	–/–
Top score	47
Catches/stumpings	3/–
- Source: Cricinfo, 31 May 2020

Rory Owen Donnellan (20 June 1941 – 15 January 1977) was a South African first-class cricketer.

Donnellan was born at Durban in June 1941. He was educated at Durban High School, before to study in England as a Rhodes Scholar at Magdalen College, Oxford. While studying at Oxford, he played first-class cricket for Oxford University in 1963, making five appearances. He scored 173 runs in his five matches, at an average of 17.30 and a high score of 47. In addition to playing cricket, Donnellan was an equestrian who represented South Africa at the Evesham Horse Show in England. Donnellan died in a climbing accident in the Drakensberg in January 1977.
