= Ben Swanson (cricketer) =

English cricketer

Personal information
- Full name: Ben Swanson
- Born: 1998 (age 27–28); London, England
- Batting: Left-handed
- Bowling: Slow left-arm orthodox

Domestic team information
- Years: Team
- 2017–2019: Oxford University

Career statistics
Competition	First-class
Matches	2
Runs scored	3
Batting average	1.50
100s/50s	–/–
Top score	3
Balls bowled	330
Wickets	2
Bowling average	52.00
5 wickets in innings	–
10 wickets in match	–
Best bowling	1/26
Catches/stumpings	3/–
- Source: Cricinfo, 3 July 2020

Ben Swanson (London) is an English first-class cricketer.

Swanson was born at London. He later studied at St Peter's College at the University of Oxford. While studying at Oxford, he made two appearances in first-class cricket for Oxford University against Cambridge University in The University Matches of 2017 and 2019. Swanson took a single wicket in each of the matches with his slow left-arm orthodox bowling, that of Nipuna Senaratne.

Swanson was later elected captain of the University team for the 2023-24 season.
