= Charles Loch =

Scottish cricketer and clergyman

Personal information
- Full name: Charles Ramsay Fleming Loch
- Born: 11 February 1825; Edinburgh, Midlothian, Scotland
- Died: 7 July 1892 (aged 67); Dumfries, Dumfriesshire, Scotland
- Batting: Unknown
- Bowling: Unknown

Domestic team information
- Years: Team
- 1845–1848: Oxford University

Career statistics
Competition	First-class
Matches	5
Runs scored	37
Batting average	6.16
100s/50s	–/–
Top score	13
Balls bowled	92
Wickets	6
Bowling average	?
5 wickets in innings	–
10 wickets in match	–
Best bowling	4/?
Catches/stumpings	1/–
- Source: Cricinfo, 25 June 2020

Charles Ramsay Fleming Loch (11 February 1825 – 7 July 1892) was a Scottish first-class cricketer and clergyman.

The son of William Loch, was born at Edinburgh in February 1825. He was educated at both the Edinburgh Academy and Rugby School. He later matriculated to University College, Oxford in 1844. While studying at Oxford, he made five appearances in first-class cricket for Oxford University between 1845 and 1848, including two appearances in The University Match. He scored 37 runs in his five appearances, in addition to taking 6 wickets.

After graduating from Oxford, Seymour took holy orders in the Church of England. He was reverend at Berhampore in British India. Loch died in Scotland at Dumfries in July 1892.
