= Justin Higgo =

English cricketer

Personal information
- Full name: Justin Beresford Higgo
- Born: 28 September 1968 (age 58); Cape Town, Cape Province, South Africa
- Batting: Right-handed
- Bowling: Right-arm off break

Domestic team information
- Years: Team
- 1989: Oxford University

Career statistics
Competition	First-class
Matches	3
Runs scored	18
Batting average	3.00
100s/50s	–/–
Top score	9
Catches/stumpings	2/–
- Source: Cricinfo, 11 July 2020

Justin Beresford Higgo KC (born 28 September 1968) is a South African-born English barrister and former first-class cricketer.

Higgo was born at Cape Town in September 1968. He later studied classics in England at Christ Church at the University of Oxford. While studying at Oxford, he made three appearances in first-class cricket for Oxford University in 1989, against Nottinghamshire, Middlesex and Hampshire, scoring a total of 16 runs in his three matches.

After graduating from Oxford, he studied law at City, University of London. He was called to the bar as a member of Gray's Inn in 1995. He is currently a governor at Lancing College, where children were educated.
