= John Branston =

English cricketer (1932–2023)

Personal information
- Full name: John Richard Martin Branston
- Born: 20 April 1932; Nuneaton, Warwickshire, England
- Died: 10 September 2023 (aged 91)
- Batting: Right-handed
- Bowling: Right-arm medium

Domestic team information
- Years: Team
- 1956: Oxford University

Career statistics
Competition	First-class
Matches	5
Runs scored	32
Batting average	8.00
100s/50s	–/–
Top score	19
Balls bowled	559
Wickets	9
Bowling average	26.11
5 wickets in innings	–
10 wickets in match	–
Best bowling	3/50
Catches/stumpings	2/–
- Source: Cricinfo, 20 April 2014

John Richard Martin Branston (20 April 1932 – 10 September 2023) was an English cricketer active in the mid-1950s. Born in Nuneaton, Warwickshire, was a right-handed batsman who bowled right-arm medium pace, making several appearances in first-class cricket.

Branston made his debut in first-class cricket for the Free Foresters against Oxford University at the University Parks in 1955. Branston was also a student at the University of Oxford, playing four first-class matches for the university in 1956. In five appearances in first-class cricket, he scored 32 runs with a top-score of 19, while with the ball he took 9 wickets with best figures of 3/50.

Outside of cricket, Branston was a teacher who spent his entire career at Whitgift School. He died on 10 September 2023, at the age of 91.

== External list ==
- John Branston at Cricinfo
