= Mark Patten =

Scottish cricketer

Personal information
- Full name: Mark Patten
- Born: 28 July 1901; Edinburgh, Midlothian, Scotland
- Died: 2 May 1996 (aged 94); Ashford, Kent, England
- Batting: Right-handed
- Role: Wicket-keeper

Domestic team information
- Years: Team
- 1922–1925: Scotland
- 1922–1923: Oxford University

Career statistics
Competition	First-class
Matches	26
Runs scored	407
Batting average	11.97
100s/50s	–/2
Top score	58
Catches/stumpings	37/3
- Source: Cricinfo, 4 June 2019

Mark Patten (28 July 1901 – 2 May 1996) was a Scottish first-class cricketer.

Patten was born in the West End of Edinburgh in July 1901. He was educated at Winchester College, before going up to Christ Church, Oxford. While studying at Oxford he made his debut in first-class cricket for Oxford University against Middlesex at Oxford in 1922. Patten played first-class cricket for Oxford on seventeen further occasions, with his final appearance coming in 1923. Playing as a wicket-keeper he scored 169 runs and took 26 catches and made two stumpings. In addition to playing first-class cricket for Oxford University, he also represented Scotland in four first-class matches between 1922 and 1925, as well as appearing in four first-class matches for the Free Foresters between 1926 and 1929; for the latter he scored 178 runs at an average of 35.60, with a high score of 58, one of two half centuries he made for the Free Foresters. He died in May 1996 at Ashford, Kent.
