= Rupert Gordon-Walker =

Scottish cricketer (born 1961)

Personal information
- Full name: Rupert Adam Gordon-Walker
- Born: 10 August 1961 (age 65); Moniaive, Dumfriesshire, Scotland
- Batting: Left-handed
- Role: Wicket-keeper

Domestic team information
- Years: Team
- 1981: Oxford University

Career statistics
Competition	First-class
Matches	3
Runs scored	19
Batting average	4.75
100s/50s	–/–
Top score	12
Catches/stumpings	3/2
- Source: Cricinfo, 12 May 2020

Rupert Adam Gordon-Walker (born 10 August 1961) is a Scottish former first-class cricketer.

Gordon-Walker was born in August 1961 at Moniaive, Dumfriesshire. He later studied in England at Keble College at the University of Oxford. While studying at Oxford, he made three appearances in first-class cricket for Oxford University in 1981, against Yorkshire, Gloucestershire and Leicestershire. Playing as a wicket-keeper, Gordon-Walker scored 19 runs in his three matches, while behind the stumps he took three catches and made two stumpings. After graduating from Oxford, he worked in the City of London. His nephew was the politician Patrick Gordon Walker.
