= Paddy Evans (cricketer) =

English cricketer (born 1981)

Personal information
- Full name: Patrick Peter Evans
- Born: 25 August 1981 (age 45); Hammersmith, London, England
- Batting: Right-handed
- Role: Wicket-keeper

Domestic team information
- Years: Team
- 2002–2003: Oxford University

Career statistics
Competition	First-class
Matches	2
Runs scored	30
Batting average	15.00
100s/50s	–/–
Top score	16
Catches/stumpings	6/–
- Source: Cricinfo, 2 March 2020

Patrick Peter Evans (born 25 August 1981) is an English former first-class cricketer.

Evans was born at Hammersmith in August 1981. He later studied at Keble College, Oxford where he played first-class cricket for Oxford University. He made two first-class appearances for Oxford, playing in The University Matches of 2002 and 2003 against Cambridge University. Playing as a wicket-keeper, he scored 30 runs with a high score of 16.
