= Philip Durack =

Australian cricketer, barrister

Personal information
- Full name: John Philip Durack
- Born: 18 May 1956 (age 70); Perth, Western Australia, Australia
- Batting: Right-handed
- Bowling: Leg break

Domestic team information
- Years: Team
- 1980: Oxford University

Career statistics
Competition	First-class
Matches	7
Runs scored	136
Batting average	10.46
100s/50s	–/–
Top score	45
Balls bowled	52
Wickets	0
Bowling average	–
5 wickets in innings	–
10 wickets in match	–
Best bowling	–
Catches/stumpings	3/–
- Source: Cricinfo, 1 June 2020

John Philip Durack SC (born 18 May 1956) is an Australian barrister and former first-class cricketer.

The son of Peter Durack, he was born at Perth in May 1956. He later studied at the University of Western Australia, before going to England to study for his Bachelor of Civil Law at Magdalen College, Oxford. While studying at Oxford, he played first-class cricket for Oxford University in 1980, making seven appearances. In his seven matches, he scored 136 runs at an average of 10.46 with a high score of 45. After graduating from Oxford, Durack returned to Australia where he is a practicing barrister.
