= Benjamin Vonwiller =

Australian cricketer (born 1975)

Personal information
- Full name: Benjamin Michael Vonwiller
- Born: 16 March 1975 (age 51); Sydney, New South Wales, Australia
- Batting: Right-handed
- Bowling: Right-arm medium-fast

Domestic team information
- Years: Team
- 2000: Oxford Universities
- 2002: Oxford University

Career statistics
Competition	First-class
Matches	3
Runs scored	5
Batting average	5.00
100s/50s	–/–
Top score	4*
Balls bowled	270
Wickets	5
Bowling average	43.40
5 wickets in innings	–
10 wickets in match	–
Best bowling	2/59
Catches/stumpings	3/–
- Source: Cricinfo, 6 March 2020

Benjamin Michael Vonwiller (born 16 March 1975) is an Australian former first-class cricketer.

Vonwiller was born at Sydney in March 1975. He later studied at University of Sydney where he graduated with dual first-class honours in arts and law, before studying for his PhD in England at Trinity College, Oxford. While studying at Oxford he played first-class cricket. He made two appearances in 2000 against Somerset and Warwickshire for an Oxford Universities side, a forerunner of Oxford UCCE which was formed in 2001. He made a third first-class appearance for Oxford University against Cambridge University in The University Match of 2002. Vonwiller later emigrated to the United States, where he is the head of global media, entertainment and professional sports practices at McKinsey & Company.
