= Richard Storer =

English cricketer, barrister

Personal information
- Full name: Richard Elliott Daniel Storer
- Born: 9 May 1948 (age 78); Nottingham, Nottinghamshire, England
- Batting: Right-handed
- Role: Wicket-keeper

Domestic team information
- Years: Team
- 1972: Oxford University

Career statistics
Competition	First-class
Matches	4
Runs scored	13
Batting average	4.33
100s/50s	–/–
Top score	9
Catches/stumpings	2/–
- Source: Cricinfo, 16 April 2020

Richard Elliott Daniel Storer (born 9 May 1948) is an English former first-class cricketer.

Storer was born at Nottingham in May 1948. He later studied at Brasenose College at the University of Oxford, where he played first-class cricket for Oxford University in 1972, making four appearances against Hampshire, Derbyshire, Middlesex and Nottinghamshire. He failed to impress at first-class level, scoring just 13 runs from six innings.
