= Malcolm Sygrove =

English cricketer (born 1966)

Personal information
- Full name: Malcolm Robert Sygrove
- Born: 17 February 1966 (age 60); Lutterworth, Leicestershire, England
- Batting: Right-handed
- Bowling: Right-arm medium

Domestic team information
- Years: Team
- 1986–1988: Oxford University

Career statistics
Competition	First-class
Matches	8
Runs scored	37
Batting average	5.28
100s/50s	–/–
Top score	8*
Balls bowled	1,396
Wickets	20
Bowling average	46.65
5 wickets in innings	–
10 wickets in match	–
Best bowling	3/91
Catches/stumpings	–/–
- Source: Cricinfo, 28 March 2020

Malcolm Robert Sygrove (born 17 February 1966) is an English former first-class cricketer.

Sygrove was born in February 1966 at Lutterworth, Leicestershire. He later studied at St John's College, Oxford where he played first-class cricket for Oxford University. He made his debut against Lancashire at Oxford in 1986. He played first-class cricket for Oxford until 1988, making eight appearances. Playing as a right-arm medium pace bowler, he took 20 wickets in his eight matches, at an average of 46.65 and best figures of 3 for 91.
