= Peter Huxford =

English cricketer

Personal information
- Full name: Peter Nigel Huxford
- Born: 17 February 1960 (age 66); Enfield, Middlesex, England
- Batting: Left-handed
- Role: Wicket-keeper

Domestic team information
- Years: Team
- 1980–1981: Oxford University

Career statistics
Competition	First-class
Matches	7
Runs scored	27
Batting average	5.40
100s/50s	–/–
Top score	10
Catches/stumpings	3/2
- Source: Cricinfo, 4 May 2020

Peter Nigel Huxford (born 17 February 1960) is an English former first-class cricketer.

Huxford was born at Enfield in February 1960. He later studied at Christ Church, Oxford. While studying at Oxford, he played first-class cricket for Oxford University in 1980–81, making seven appearances. Playing as a wicket-keeper, he scored 27 runs and took three catches and made two stumpings.
