= Stuart Verity =

English cricketer (born 1948)

Personal information
- Full name: Stuart Anthony Verity
- Born: 11 November 1948 (age 78); Bradford, Yorkshire, England
- Batting: Right-handed
- Bowling: Right-arm medium

Domestic team information
- Years: Team
- 1969–1970: Oxford University

Career statistics
| Competition | First-class |
|---|---|
| Matches | 4 |
| Runs scored | 55 |
| Batting average | 11.00 |
| 100s/50s | –/– |
| Top score | 15 |
| Balls bowled | 518 |
| Wickets | 4 |
| Bowling average | 65.00 |
| 5 wickets in innings | – |
| 10 wickets in match | – |
| Best bowling | 3/42 |
| Catches/stumpings | –/– |
- Source: Cricinfo, 6 March 2020

Stuart Anthony Verity (born 11 November 1948) is an English former first-class cricketer.

Verity was born at Bradford in November 1948. He later studied at Corpus Christi College, Oxford where he played first-class cricket for Oxford University. He made four appearances for Oxford, playing two matches each 1969 and 1970 against county opposition. He scored a total of 55 runs in his four matches, with a high score of 15. With his right-arm medium pace bowling, he took 4 wickets with best figures of 3 for 42.
