= David Money =

English cricketer

Personal information
- Full name: David Charles Money
- Born: 5 October 1918; Oxford, Oxfordshire, England
- Died: 7 October 2004 (aged 86); Bedford, Bedfordshire, England
- Batting: Right-handed
- Role: Wicket-keeper

Domestic team information
- Years: Team
- 1938–1946: Oxfordshire
- 1947: Oxford University
- 1950–1952: Bedfordshire

Career statistics
Competition	First-class
Matches	1
Runs scored	27
Batting average	–
100s/50s	–/–
Top score	27*
Catches/stumpings	1/1
- Source: Cricinfo, 23 June 2019

David Charles Money (5 October 1918 – 7 October 2004) was an English first-class cricketer.

Money was born at Oxford in October 1918, where he studied at St John's at the University of Oxford, graduating with a degree in chemistry in 1940. He had debuted in minor counties cricket for Oxfordshire in the 1938 Minor Counties Championship. After graduating he fought in the Second World War, enlisting with the Royal Engineers as a second lieutenant in November 1940. Following the end of the war he married Madge Matthews in November 1945, as well as resuming studying at the University of Oxford. He played two further minor counties matches for Oxfordshire in 1946, before appearing for Oxford University in a first-class match against the Combined Services at Oxford in 1947.

After graduating with a degree in geography in 1947, he took up a teaching post at Bedford School. He was made a lieutenant while instructing the Bedford School contingent of the Officers' Training Corps. He began playing minor counties cricket for Bedfordshire in 1950, with Money playing for Bedfordshire until 1952, making fourteen appearances in the Minor Counties Championship. Outside of his teaching career, Money published several books on geographical subjects between 1954–2000. He died at Bedford in October 2004.
