= Richard Luddington =

English cricketer (born 1960)

Personal information
- Full name: Richard Simon Luddington
- Born: 8 April 1960 (age 66); Kingston upon Thames, Surrey, England
- Batting: Right-handed
- Role: Wicket-keeper

Domestic team information
- Years: Team
- 1982: Oxford University

Career statistics
| Competition | First-class |
|---|---|
| Matches | 10 |
| Runs scored | 290 |
| Batting average | 22.30 |
| 100s/50s | –/2 |
| Top score | 65 |
| Catches/stumpings | 5/1 |
- Source: Cricinfo, 20 May 2020

Richard Simon Luddington (born 8 April 1960) is an English former first-class cricketer.

Luddington was born at Kingston upon Thames in April 1960. He was educated at King's College School, Wimbledon and went on to read Modern History at St Edmund Hall, Oxford (1978–81) followed by a M.Phil in Management Studies (1981–83). While studying at Oxford he had the rare distinction of earning a Full Blue in three major sports - rugby union, hockey and cricket.

Luddington played first-class cricket for Oxford University CC, making his debut against Northamptonshire at The Parks in 1982 and appearing ten times for OUCC in that season. Playing as a wicket-keeper, he scored a total of 290 runs in his ten matches at an average of 22.30 with a high score of 65; while behind the stumps he took five catches and made a single stumping.

After university he enjoyed a successful career in banking with JP Morgan, UBS and Morgan Stanley whilst continuing to play rugby with KCS Old Boys and cricket for Teddington CC and the MCC.
