= Nicholas Morrill =

English cricketer (born 1957)

Personal information
- Full name: Nicholas David Morrill
- Born: 9 December 1957 (age 68); Ryde, Isle of Wight, England
- Batting: Right-handed
- Bowling: Right-arm off break

Domestic team information
- Years: Team
- 1978–1979: Oxford University

Career statistics
Competition	First-class
Matches	14
Runs scored	241
Batting average	13.38
100s/50s	–/–
Top score	45
Balls bowled	1,330
Wickets	12
Bowling average	61.75
5 wickets in innings	–
10 wickets in match	–
Best bowling	3/53
Catches/stumpings	5/–
- Source: Cricinfo, 30 March 2020

Nicholas David Morrill (born 9 December 1957) is an English former first-class cricketer.

Morrill was born at Ryde on the Isle of Wight in December 1957. He later studied at Lincoln College, Oxford where he played first-class cricket for Oxford University in 1978 and 1979. He made his debut against Kent at Oxford, with Morrill making a further thirteen appearances, which in 1979 included playing against the touring Sri Lankans and featuring in The University Match against Cambridge at Lord's. He scored 241 runs in his fourteen matches, at an average of 13.38 and a high score of 45. With his right-arm off break bowling, he took 12 wickets at a bowling average of 61.75 and with best figures of 3 for 53. After graduating from Oxford, he became an investor with the investment company Rutland Ventures.
