= William Townsend (cricketer) =

English cricketer, barrister

Personal information
- Full name: William Henry Townsend
- Born: 17 February 1821; Mansfield, Nottinghamshire, England
- Died: 26 February 1891 (aged 70); Dulwich, Surrey, England
- Batting: Unknown
- Bowling: Unknown

Domestic team information
- Years: Team
- 1842–1843: Oxford University

Career statistics
| Competition | First-class |
|---|---|
| Matches | 4 |
| Runs scored | 33 |
| Batting average | 4.12 |
| 100s/50s | –/– |
| Top score | 10 |
| Balls bowled | ? |
| Wickets | 4 |
| Bowling average | ? |
| 5 wickets in innings | – |
| 10 wickets in match | – |
| Best bowling | 4/? |
| Catches/stumpings | 1/– |
- Source: Cricinfo, 5 April 2020

William Henry Townsend (17 February 1821 – 26 February 1891) was an English first-class cricketer and barrister.

The son of Robert Townsend, he was born at Mansfield in February 1821. He later studied at Lincoln College, Oxford where he played first-class cricket for Oxford University. He made his first-class debut against Cambridge University in The University Match of 1842. He made three further first-class appearances for Oxford, making a further appearance in 1842 and two appearances in 1843. His four first-class wickets all came in one match, against the Marylebone Cricket Club in 1842 at Lord's. A student of Lincoln's Inn, he was called to the bar as a barrister in November 1847. Townsend died at Dulwich in February 1891.
