= John Chessher =

English cricketer

Personal information
- Full name: John Robert Chessher
- Born: 21 August 1962 (age 64); Banstead, Surrey, England
- Batting: Right-handed
- Bowling: Right-arm medium

Domestic team information
- Years: Team
- 1982–1983: Oxford University

Career statistics
Competition	First-class
Matches	4
Runs scored	78
Batting average	15.60
100s/50s	–/–
Top score	47
Catches/stumpings	–/–
- Source: Cricinfo, 17 February 2020

John Robert Chessher (born 21 August 1962) is an English former first-class cricketer.

Chessher was born at Banstead in August 1962. He later studied at Lincoln College, Oxford. While studying at Oxford, Chessher made four appearances in first-class cricket for Oxford University, debuting against Northamptonshire at Oxford in 1982. He made two further first-class appearances for Oxford that year, following that up with a further appearance in 1983. He scored 78 runs in his four matches at an average of 15.60 and a high score of 47.
