= Adrian Mee =

English cricketer

Personal information
- Full name: Adrian Alexander Graham Mee
- Born: 29 May 1963 (age 63); Johannesburg, Transvaal, South Africa
- Batting: Right-handed

Domestic team information
- Years: Team
- 1984–1987: Oxford University

Career statistics
Competition	First-class
Matches	10
Runs scored	191
Batting average	12.73
100s/50s	–/1
Top score	51
Catches/stumpings	4/–
- Source: Cricinfo, 14 June 2020

Adrian Alexander Graham Mee (born 29 May 1963) is a South African-born English former first-class cricketer.

Mee was born at Johannesburg in May 1963, but was educated in England at Merchant Taylors' School. From there he went up to Oriel College, Oxford. While studying at Oxford, he played first-class cricket for Oxford University from 1984–87, making ten appearances. Mee scored 191 runs in his ten matches, at an average of 12.73 and with a high score of 51.
