= Trevor Jack =

Australian cricketer (born 1960)

Personal information
- Full name: Trevor Bernard Jack
- Born: 19 July 1960 (age 66); Perth, Western Australia, Australia
- Batting: Right-handed
- Bowling: Leg break

Domestic team information
- Years: Team
- 1988: Oxford University

Career statistics
| Competition | First-class |
|---|---|
| Matches | 2 |
| Runs scored | 57 |
| Batting average | 19.00 |
| 100s/50s | –/– |
| Top score | 29 |
| Catches/stumpings | 1/– |
- Source: Cricinfo, 4 March 2020

Trevor Bernard Jack (born 19 Jul 1960) is an Australian former first-class cricketer.

Jack was born at Perth Western Australia in June 1960. He later studied in England at Keble College, Oxford. While studying at Oxford, he played first-class cricket for Oxford University, making two appearances against Lancashire and Gloucestershire in 1988. He scored 57 runs in his two matches, with a high score of 29.
