= Neil Gamble =

English cricketer

Personal information
- Full name: Neil Walton Gamble
- Born: 17 January 1943 (age 83); Macclesfield, Cheshire, England
- Batting: Left-handed
- Bowling: Right-arm medium

Domestic team information
- Years: Team
- 1967: Oxford University
- 1965–1973: Cheshire

Career statistics
Competition	First-class
Matches	13
Runs scored	87
Batting average	7.25
100s/50s	–/–
Top score	24
Balls bowled	1,384
Wickets	19
Bowling average	41.36
5 wickets in innings	0
10 wickets in match	0
Best bowling	4/57
Catches/stumpings	8/–
- Source: Cricinfo, 13 October 2018

Neil Walton Gamble (born 17 January 1943) is a former English first-class cricketer.

Gamble was born at Macclesfield in Cheshire. He made his debut in minor counties cricket for Cheshire in 1965 against Northumberland at Macclesfield in the Minor Counties Championship. Later attending St Edmund Hall, Oxford, Gamble made his debut in first-class cricket for Oxford University in 1967 against Warwickshire at Oxford, with him featuring in thirteen first-class matches in 1967. In what was his only season of first-class cricket, Gamble scored 87 runs with a highest score of 24; with his medium pace he took 19 wickets at an average of 41.36, with best figures of 4/57. He continued to play minor counties cricket intermittently for Cheshire until 1973, making a total of twelve appearances in the Minor Counties Championship. After leaving Oxford, Gamble became a teacher in Derbyshire, Lancashire, Birmingham and Devon. He was the headteacher of King Edward V1 Aston, School and Exeter School. He became CEO of Devon County Cricket Club in 2010 and Chairman in 2016.
