= Russell Thomson =

South African cricketer (born 1969)

Personal information
- Full name: Russell Bernard Thomson
- Born: 16 August 1969 (age 57); Johannesburg, Transvaal, South Africa
- Batting: Right-handed
- Bowling: Right-arm medium

Domestic team information
- Years: Team
- 1996: Oxford University

Career statistics
Competition	First-class
Matches	10
Runs scored	34
Batting average	–
100s/50s	–/–
Top score	14*
Balls bowled	1,102
Wickets	9
Bowling average	58.55
5 wickets in innings	–
10 wickets in match	–
Best bowling	2/24
Catches/stumpings	1/–
- Source: Cricinfo, 24 June 2020

Russell Bernard Thomson (born 16 August 1969) is a South Africa former first-class cricketer.

Thomson was born at Johannesburg in August 1969. He later studied in England at Keble College at the University of Oxford. While studying at Oxford, he played first-class cricket for Oxford University in 1996, making ten appearances, which included playing in that years University Match against Cambridge at Lord's. A right-arm medium pace, Thomson took 9 wickets in his ten matches an average of 58.55, with best figures of 2 for 24.
