= Stuart Ridge =

English cricketer (born 1961)

Personal information
- Full name: Stuart Peter Ridge
- Born: 23 November 1961 (age 64); Beaconsfield, Buckinghamshire, England
- Batting: Right-handed
- Bowling: Right-arm medium

Domestic team information
- Years: Team
- 1981–1982: Oxford University
- 1980–1982: Buckinghamshire

Career statistics
Competition	First-class
Matches	11
Runs scored	71
Batting average	7.88
100s/50s	–/–
Top score	22
Balls bowled	1,579
Wickets	14
Bowling average	63.85
5 wickets in innings	–
10 wickets in match	–
Best bowling	4/128
Catches/stumpings	3/–
- Source: Cricinfo, 12 May 2011

Stuart Peter Ridge (born 23 November 1961) is a former English cricketer. Ridge was a right-handed batsman who bowled right-arm medium pace. He was born in Beaconsfield, Buckinghamshire.

Ridge made his debut for Buckinghamshire in the 1980 Minor Counties Championship against Oxfordshire. He played Minor counties cricket for Buckinghamshire from 1980 to 1982, making 5 appearances.

In 1981, he made his first-class debut for Oxford University against Leicestershire. He played 10 further first-class matches for the university, the last coming against Cambridge University in 1982. In his 11 first-class matches for the university, he scored 71 runs at a batting average of 7.88, with a highest score of 22. With the ball he took 14 wickets at a bowling average of 63.85, with best figures of 4/128.
