= Michael Ivey =

English cricketer

Personal information
- Full name: Alfred Michael Ivey
- Born: 11 July 1928; Leeds, Yorkshire, England
- Died: 10 August 2001 (aged 73); Hammersmith, London, England
- Batting: Right-handed
- Bowling: Right-arm medium

Domestic team information
- Years: Team
- 1949–1951: Oxford University

Career statistics
Competition	First-class
Matches	7
Runs scored	220
Batting average	18.33
100s/50s	–/–
Top score	40
Balls bowled	324
Wickets	2
Bowling average	80.00
5 wickets in innings	–
10 wickets in match	–
Best bowling	1/7
Catches/stumpings	11/–
- Source: Cricinfo, 30 May 2019

Alfred Michael Ivey (11 July 1928 – 10 August 2001) was an English first-class cricketer.

Ivey was born at Leeds in July 1939, where he was educated at a grammar school in the city. From there he went up to Brasenose College, Oxford. While studying at Oxford he made his debut in first-class cricket for the Oxford University against the Free Foresters at Oxford in 1949. He made five further first-class appearances for Oxford University across the 1950 and 1951 seasons, but was unable to command a regular place in the team. Playing predominantly as a batsman, Ivey scored 210 runs for Oxford, with a high score of 40. His final appearance in first-class cricket came in the 1951 season for the Free Foresters against Oxford University. He died at Hammersmith in August 2001.
