= David Moor (cricketer) =

English cricketer

Personal information
- Full name: David Child Moor
- Born: 18 December 1934 (age 91); Faversham, Kent, England
- Batting: Left-handed

Domestic team information
- Years: Team
- 1956: Oxford University

Career statistics
Competition	First-class
Matches	3
Runs scored	42
Batting average	8.40
100s/50s	0/0
Top score	22
Catches/stumpings	0/–
- Source: Cricinfo, 1 April 2020

David Child Moor (born 18 December 1934) is an English former first-class cricketer.

Moor was born at Faversham in December 1934. He attended The King's School, Canterbury, where he was considered one of the most promising public schools batsmen in 1954. He went on to Trinity College, Oxford where he played first-class cricket for Oxford University in 1956. He made three appearances, all at Oxford, against Yorkshire, Hampshire and Lancashire. He scored 44 runs in his three matches, with a high score of 22.
