= Martyn Lloyd =

English cricketer

Personal information
- Full name: Martyn Frederick Dafydd Lloyd
- Born: 6 June 1954; Headington, Oxfordshire, England
- Died: 2 March 2017 (aged 62)
- Batting: Right-handed
- Bowling: Right-arm medium

Domestic team information
- Years: Team
- 1981: Dorset
- 1974–1977: Oxfordshire
- 1974–1975: Oxford University

Career statistics
Competition	First-class
Matches	6
Runs scored	74
Batting average	6.72
100s/50s	–/–
Top score	36
Balls bowled	–
Wickets	–
Bowling average	–
5 wickets in innings	–
10 wickets in match	–
Best bowling	–
Catches/stumpings	2/–
- Source: Cricinfo, 2 June 2011

Martyn Frederick Dafydd Lloyd (6 June 1954 – 2 March 2017) was an English cricketer. Lloyd was a right-handed batsman who bowled right-arm medium pace. He was born in Headington, Oxfordshire.

Lloyd made his first-class debut for Oxford University against Somerset in 1974. He appeared in 5 further first-class matches for the university, the last coming against Sussex in 1975. In his 6 matches, he scored 74 runs at a batting average of 6.72, with a highest score of 36. He did not bowl in first-class cricket.

Lloyd made his debut for Oxfordshire in the 1974 Minor Counties Championship against Wiltshire. He played Minor counties cricket for Oxfordshire from 1974 to 1977, before playing a handful of games for Dorset in 1981.
