= Henry Denison =

English cricketer

Henry Denison (born 2 June 1810, Ossington, Nottinghamshire; died 30 November 1858, Ossington) was an English cricketer who was associated with Oxford University Cricket Club and made his debut in 1829.

Denison was educated at Eton and Christ Church, Oxford. He was a fellow of All Souls College, Oxford, 1831–40. He studied law at Lincoln's Inn and was called to the bar in 1835.

== Bibliography ==
- Haygarth, Arthur (1862). Scores & Biographies, Volume 2 (1827–1840). Lillywhite.
