= Mike Hobbiss =

English cricketer (born 1985)

Personal information
- Full name: Michael Holland Hobbiss
- Born: 17 August 1985 (age 41); Manchester, Lancashire, England
- Batting: Right-handed
- Bowling: Right-arm medium

Domestic team information
- Years: Team
- 2006–2007: Oxford University

Career statistics
Competition	First-class
Matches	2
Runs scored	93
Batting average	93.00
100s/50s	–/1
Top score	78*
Balls bowled	54
Wickets	0
Bowling average	–
5 wickets in innings	–
10 wickets in match	–
Best bowling	–
Catches/stumpings	–/–
- Source: Cricinfo, 13 May 2020

Michael Holland Hobbiss (born 17 August 1985) is an English former first-class cricketer.

Hobbiss was born in August 1985 at Manchester. He later studied at Worcester College at the University of Oxford. While studying at Oxford, he made two appearances in first-class cricket for Oxford University against Cambridge University in The University Matches of 2006 and 2007, scoring an unbeaten 78 in the 2006 fixture.

After graduating from Oxford, he moved into teaching for eight years, before pursuing his PhD in neuroscience alongside Dr Nilli Lavie at University College London in 2015.
