= Neil Salvi =

English cricketer and educator

Personal information
- Full name: Neil Vijay Salvi
- Born: 21 May 1965 (age 61); Gwalior, Madhya Pradesh, India
- Batting: Right-handed
- Bowling: Leg break

Domestic team information
- Years: Team
- 1986–1987: Oxford University

Career statistics
Competition	First-class
Matches	5
Runs scored	131
Batting average	18.71
100s/50s	–/–
Top score	36
Catches/stumpings	2/–
- Source: Cricinfo, 1 July 2020

Neil Vijay Salvi (born 21 May 1965) is an Indian-born English educator and a former businessman and first-class cricketer.

Salvi was born in Gwalior in May 1965. He emigrated to England with his parents at a young age, where he studied mathematics at Christ Church, Oxford. While studying at Oxford, he played first-class cricket for Oxford University in 1986 and 1987, making five appearances. He scored 131 runs in his five matches, averaging 18.71 with a high score of 36.

Salvi later studied for an MBA at INSEAD. After graduating, he went into business founding a number of start-ups. He later left business to become a schoolteacher, teaching firstly at Highgate School before moving to Oundle School in 2018. Salvi is married with two daughters and a cat.
