= Desmond Anderson (cricketer) =

English cricketer

Personal information
- Full name: Desmond John Anderson
- Born: 17 October 1968 (age 58); Johannesburg, South Africa
- Batting: Right-handed
- Bowling: Right-arm medium

Domestic team information
- Years: Team
- 1992: Oxford University Cricket Club

Career statistics
Competition	First-class
Matches	8
Runs scored	18
Batting average	4.50
100s/50s	0/0
Top score	9
Balls bowled	989
Wickets	9
Bowling average	56.77
5 wickets in innings	0
10 wickets in match	0
Best bowling	2/68
Catches/stumpings	0/–
- Source: CricketArchive, 9 August 2008

Desmond John Anderson (born 17 October 1968) is a former first-class cricketer who played for Oxford University. His highest score of 9 came in the match against Hampshire. His best bowling of 2/68 came in the match against Worcestershire.
