= Matthew Fanning =

English cricketer

Personal information
- Full name: Matthew J. Fanning
- Born: Unknown; England
- Batting: Right-handed
- Bowling: Right-arm fast-medium

Domestic team information
- Years: Team
- 2018–2019: Oxford University

Career statistics
Competition	First-class
Matches	2
Runs scored	1
Batting average	1.00
100s/50s	–/–
Top score	1
Balls bowled	305
Wickets	3
Bowling average	42.66
5 wickets in innings	–
10 wickets in match	–
Best bowling	3/47
Catches/stumpings	–/–
- Source: Cricinfo, 24 June 2020

Matthew J. Fanning is an English first-class cricketer.

While studying at the University of Oxford, Fanning made two appearances in first-class cricket for Oxford University against Cambridge University in The University Matches of 2018 and 2019, taking 3 wickets.
