= Roy Woodcock =

English cricketer, educator

Personal information
- Full name: Roy Gordon Woodcock
- Born: 26 November 1934; Burnley, Lancashire, England
- Died: 20 August 2015 (aged 80); Malvern, Worcestershire, England
- Batting: Right-handed
- Bowling: Slow left-arm orthodox

Domestic team information
- Years: Team
- 1956–1958: Oxford University

Career statistics
Competition	First-class
Matches	29
Runs scored	779
Batting average	18.11
100s/50s	–/4
Top score	57
Balls bowled	3,886
Wickets	53
Bowling average	33.83
5 wickets in innings	–
10 wickets in match	–
Best bowling	4/54
Catches/stumpings	17/–
- Source: Cricinfo, 23 March 2020

Roy Gordon Woodcock (26 November 1934 – 20 August 2015) was an English first-class cricketer and educator.

Woodcock was born at Burnley in Lancashire in November 1934. After several years, he moved with his parents to Worcestershire, where he attended school and gained a place at Keble College, Oxford. While studying at Oxford, he played first-class cricket for Oxford University, making his debut against Yorkshire at Oxford in 1956. Woodcock played first-class cricket for Oxford until 1958, making a total of 29 first-class appearances. An all-rounder, he scored a total of 779 runs at an average of 18.11, with a high score of 57. With his slow left-arm orthodox bowling, he took 53 wickets at a bowling average of 33.83 and best figures of 4 for 54.

Prior to starting his fourth year at Oxford, he accepted a teaching post at Rossall School. He married Margaret in 1959, who he had met while the couple were at school. He moved south with his family in 1967 to take up a teaching position at Charterhouse School as head of geography. He was a housemaster from 1976 and spent his spare time writing several geography textbooks. He retired from teaching in 1995 and moved to Malvern, Worcestershire. In retirement he enjoyed walks in the Malvern Hills, writing seventeen books about walks in the hills. Woodcock died at Malvern in August 2015.
