= Robin Lees =

English cricketer (born 1949)

Personal information
- Full name: Robin Douglas Lees
- Born: 19 May 1949 (age 77); Cranleigh, Surrey, England
- Batting: Right-handed
- Bowling: Right-arm medium

Domestic team information
- Years: Team
- 1970: Oxford University

Career statistics
Competition	First-class
Matches	3
Runs scored	29
Batting average	7.25
100s/50s	–/–
Top score	17*
Balls bowled	276
Wickets	1
Bowling average	144.00
5 wickets in innings	–
10 wickets in match	–
Best bowling	1/53
Catches/stumpings	–/–
- Source: Cricinfo, 25 April 2020

Robin Douglas Lees (19 May 1949 – September 2025) was an English former first-class cricketer.

Lees was born at Cranleigh in Surrey and educated at Gresham's School and St Edmund Hall, Oxford. While studying at Oxford, he made three appearances in first-class cricket for Oxford University in 1970, against Surrey, Middlesex and Glamorgan. He scored 29 runs in his three matches, though with his right-arm medium pace bowling, he took just one wicket, that of Surrey's Stewart Storey.
