= Brian Partridge =

Scottish cricketer (born 1956)

Personal information
- Full name: Brian John Macpherson Partridge
- Born: 21 January 1956 (age 70); Haddington, Haddingtonshire, Scotland
- Batting: Right-handed
- Bowling: Right-arm medium-fast

Domestic team information
- Years: Team
- 1977: Oxford University

Career statistics
Competition	First-class
Matches	4
Runs scored	5
Batting average	2.50
100s/50s	–/–
Top score	4
Balls bowled	348
Wickets	4
Bowling average	42.50
5 wickets in innings	–
10 wickets in match	–
Best bowling	2/38
Catches/stumpings	–/–
- Source: Cricinfo, 23 June 2020

Brian John Macpherson Partridge (born 21 January 1956) is a Scottish former first-class cricketer.

Partridge was born in January 1956 at Haddington. He later studied at St Edmund Hall at the University of Oxford, where he played first-class cricket for Oxford University on four occasions in 1977. Playing as a right-arm medium-fast bowler, he took 4 wickets with best figures of 2 for 38.
