= Richard Smalley (cricketer) =

English cricketer

Personal information
- Full name: Richard George Smalley
- Born: 20 March 1979 (age 47); Newcastle upon Tyne, Northumberland, England
- Batting: Left-handed
- Role: Wicket-keeper

Domestic team information
- Years: Team
- 1999–2001: Oxford University
- 2000: Oxford Universities

Career statistics
Competition	First-class
Matches	8
Runs scored	341
Batting average	31.00
100s/50s	–/2
Top score	83
Catches/stumpings	9/5
- Source: Cricinfo, 1 July 2020

Richard George Smalley (born 20 March 1979) is an English former first-class cricketer.

The son of the minor counties cricketer Bill Smalley, he was born at Newcastle upon Tyne in March 1979. Smalley later studied at Keble College at the University of Oxford. While studying at Oxford, he made three appearances in first-class cricket for Oxford University against Nottinghamshire in 1999 and Cambridge University in The University Matches of 2000 and 2001. In addition to playing first-class cricket for Oxford University, Smalley made an additional five first-class appearances in 2000 for a combined Oxford Universities team, a forerunner of Oxford UCCE which was formed the following year. Playing as a wicket-keeper, Smalley scored 341 runs in eight first-class matches, at an average of 31.00, making one half century apiece for Oxford University and Oxford Universities. Behind the stumps he took nine catches and made five stumpings.
