= Alan Dyer =

English cricketer (born 1945)

Personal information
- Full name: Alan Willoughby Dyer
- Born: 8 July 1945 (age 81); Winchester, Hampshire, England
- Batting: Right-handed
- Role: Wicket-keeper

Domestic team information
- Years: Team
- 1965–1966: Oxford University

Career statistics
Competition	First-class
Matches	25
Runs scored	765
Batting average	23.90
100s/50s	–/3
Top score	67
Catches/stumpings	34/2
- Source: Cricinfo, 1 June 2020

Alan Willoughby Dyer (born 8 July 1945) is an English former first-class cricketer.

Dyer was born at Winchester in July 1945. He later studied at St Catherine's College at the University of Oxford. While studying at Oxford, Dyer played first-class cricket for Oxford University, making his debut against Gloucestershire at Oxford in 1965. He played first-class cricket for Oxford until 1966, making 25 appearances. Playing as a wicket-keeper, he scored 765 runs in his 25 matches at an average of 23.90, with a high score of 67 which was one of three half centuries he made. Behind the stumps, he took 34 catches and made two stumpings. After graduating from Oxford, Dyer became a schoolteacher, teaching at The King's School, Canterbury.
