= John Kilbee =

English cricketer

Personal information
- Full name: John Richard Kilbee
- Born: 24 July 1947 (age 79); Victoria, British Hong Kong
- Batting: Right-handed
- Bowling: Right-arm medium

Domestic team information
- Years: Team
- 1968–1969: Oxford University

Career statistics
Competition	First-class
Matches	8
Runs scored	70
Batting average	8.75
100s/50s	–/–
Top score	18*
Balls bowled	508
Wickets	8
Bowling average	33.75
5 wickets in innings	–
10 wickets in match	–
Best bowling	4/96
Catches/stumpings	4/–
- Source: Cricinfo, 18 June 2020

John Richard Kilbee (born 24 July 1947) is an English former first-class cricketer.

The son of Lieutenant Laurence Kilbee, he was born at Victoria in British Hong Kong during his father's military service there. He was educated in England at The King's School, Canterbury before going up to St Edmund Hall, Oxford. While studying at Oxford, he played first-class cricket for Oxford University in 1968 and 1969, making eight appearances. He scored 70 runs in these matches with a high score of 18 not out, while with his right-arm medium pace he took 8 wickets at an average of 33.75, with best figures of 4 for 96.
