= Alastair Smail =

English cricketer and judge

Personal information
- Full name: Alastair Harold Kurt Smail
- Born: 3 July 1964 (age 62); Kingston upon Thames, Surrey, England
- Batting: Right-handed
- Bowling: Left-arm medium

Domestic team information
- Years: Team
- 1983: Oxford University

Career statistics
Competition	First-class
Matches	6
Runs scored	24
Batting average	4.80
100s/50s	–/–
Top score	13*
Balls bowled	420
Wickets	5
Bowling average	44.40
5 wickets in innings	–
10 wickets in match	–
Best bowling	3/49
Catches/stumpings	1/–
- Source: Cricinfo, 8 June 2020

Alastair Harold Kurt Smail (born 3 July 1964) is an English judge and former first-class cricketer.

Smail was born at Kingston upon Thames in July 1964. He later studied at Exeter College, Oxford. While studying at Oxford, he played first-class cricket for Oxford University in 1983, making six appearances. Playing as a left-arm medium pace bowler, he took 5 wickets at an average of 44.40 and best figures of 3 for 49. As a tailend batsman, he scored 24 runs with a high score of 13 not out.

A student of Gray's Inn, he was called to the bar in 1987. He was appointed to be an employment judge of the Employment Tribunals of England Wales by Jack Straw in 2009.
