= Darren Taylor (cricketer) =

English cricketer

Personal information
- Full name: Darren Philip Taylor
- Born: 15 February 1965 (age 61); Burnley, Lancashire, England
- Batting: Right-handed
- Role: Wicket-keeper

Domestic team information
- Years: Team
- 1985–1986: Oxford University

Career statistics
Competition	First-class
Matches	8
Runs scored	44
Batting average	4.40
100s/50s	–/–
Top score	17
Catches/stumpings	7/2
- Source: Cricinfo, 24 June 2020

Darren Philip Taylor (born 15 February 1965) is an English former first-class cricketer.

Lawrence was born at Burnley in February 1965. He later studied at Christ Church, Oxford. While studying at Oxford, he played first-class cricket for Oxford University in 1985 and 1986, making eight appearances. Playing as a wicket-keeper, Taylor scored 44 runs in his eight matches, in addition to taking seven catches and making two stumpings.
