= Hasnain Malik =

Pakistani cricketer

Hasnain
Personal information
- Full name: Hasnain Siddiq Malik
- Born: 21 April 1973 (age 53); Sargodha, Punjab, Pakistan
- Batting: Left-handed
- Bowling: Right-arm off break

Domestic team information
- Years: Team
- 1992–1996: Oxford University

Career statistics
Competition	First-class
Matches	33
Runs scored	748
Batting average	20.77
100s/50s	–/4
Top score	64*
Balls bowled	3,359
Wickets	30
Bowling average	70.26
5 wickets in innings	–
10 wickets in match	–
Best bowling	3/10
Catches/stumpings	24/–
- Source: Cricinfo, 4 July 2020

Hasnain Siddiq Malik (born 21 April 1973) is a Pakistani businessman and former first-class cricketer.

Malik was born at Sargodha in August 1973. He was schooled in England at King's College School, before going up to Keble College, Oxford. While studying at Oxford, he played first-class cricket for Oxford University, making his debut against Lancashire in 1992. He played first-class cricket for Oxford until 1996, making a total of 33 appearances. Malik scored 748 runs in his 33 matches, at an average of 20.77 and a high score of 64 not out, one of four half centuries he made. With his off break bowling, he took 30 wickets at an expensive bowling average of 70.26 and best figures of 3 for 10, which came against Hampshire in a rain affected match at Oxford.

After graduating from Oxford, Malik went into business.
