= List of Old Carthusians =

Alumni of the English school Charterhouse

The following are notable Old Carthusians, who are former pupils of Charterhouse (founded in 1611).

== Politicians ==
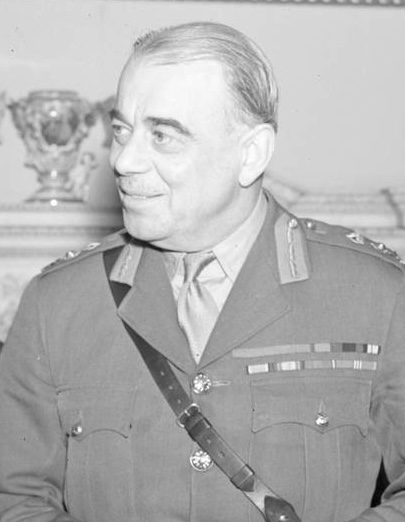
First Secretary General of NATO General Hastings Ismay, 1st Baron Ismay

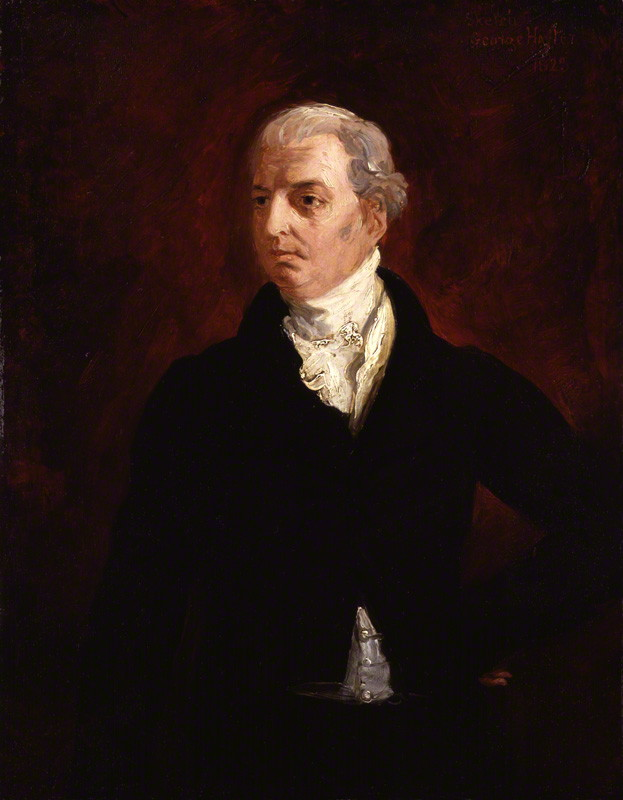
Prime Minister of the United Kingdom from 1812 to 1827 Robert Jenkinson, 2nd Earl of Liverpool

- Thomas Chataway (1864–1925), Senator for Queensland (1907–1913)
- John Colville, 1st Baron Clydesmuir (1894–1954), politician, Financial Secretary to the Treasury, 1936–1938, Secretary of State for Scotland, 1938–1940, and Governor of Bombay, 1943–1948
- Fox Maule-Ramsay, 11th Earl of Dalhousie (1801–1874), Secretary at War, 1846–1852, and Secretary of State for War, 1855–1858
- Patrick Vanden-Bempde-Johnstone, 4th Baron Derwent (1901–1986), politician
- Henry William Newman Fane (1897–1976), Chairman of Kesteven County Council (1962–1967) and High Sheriff of Lincolnshire (1952)
- Thomas Milner Gibson (1806–1884), radical politician, President of the Board of Trade, 1859–1866
- Major John Gouriet (1935–2010), Conservative political campaigner and founder of The Freedom Association
- William Haines (1810–1866), Premier of Victoria (1855–1857; 1857–1858)
- Richard Hope Hall (1924–2007), Deputy Speaker of the Rhodesia House of Assembly (1973–1977)
- General Hastings Ismay, 1st Baron Ismay (1887–1965), Secretary to the Committee of Imperial Defence, 1938–1946, Chief of Staff to the Viceroy of India, 1947–1948, and first Secretary General of NATO, 1952–1957
- Kenneth Jeyaretnam (born 1959), Singaporean politician
- Charles Jenkinson, 1st Earl of Liverpool (1729–1808), Secretary at War, 1778–1782, first President of the Board of Trade, 1786–1804, and Chancellor of the Duchy of Lancaster, 1786–1803
- Robert Jenkinson, 2nd Earl of Liverpool (1770–1828), Prime Minister, 1812–1827
- Sir Horatio Mann, 2nd Baronet (1744–1814), politician and patron of cricket
- Thomas Manners-Sutton, 1st Baron Manners (1756–1842), Lord Chancellor of Ireland (1807–1827)
- Hartland Molson (1907–2002), brewer and Canadian senator
- Geoffrey FitzClarence, 5th Earl of Munster (1906–1975), Paymaster General
- Matthew Oakeshott, Baron Oakeshott of Seagrove Bay (born 1947), peer and Treasury minister in the 2010 Coalition government
- Ralph Bernal Osborne (c. 1808–1882), politician, Secretary of the Admiralty, 1852–1858
- Ivan Power (1903–1954), British diplomat and London County Councillor
- Sir Garrard Tyrwhitt-Drake (1881–1964), Mayor of Maidstone, zoo keeper
- James Vernon (c. 1646–1727), Secretary of State
- James Stuart-Wortley, 1st Baron Wharncliffe (1776–1845), politician and Lord President of the Council, 1841–1845

=== MPs ===
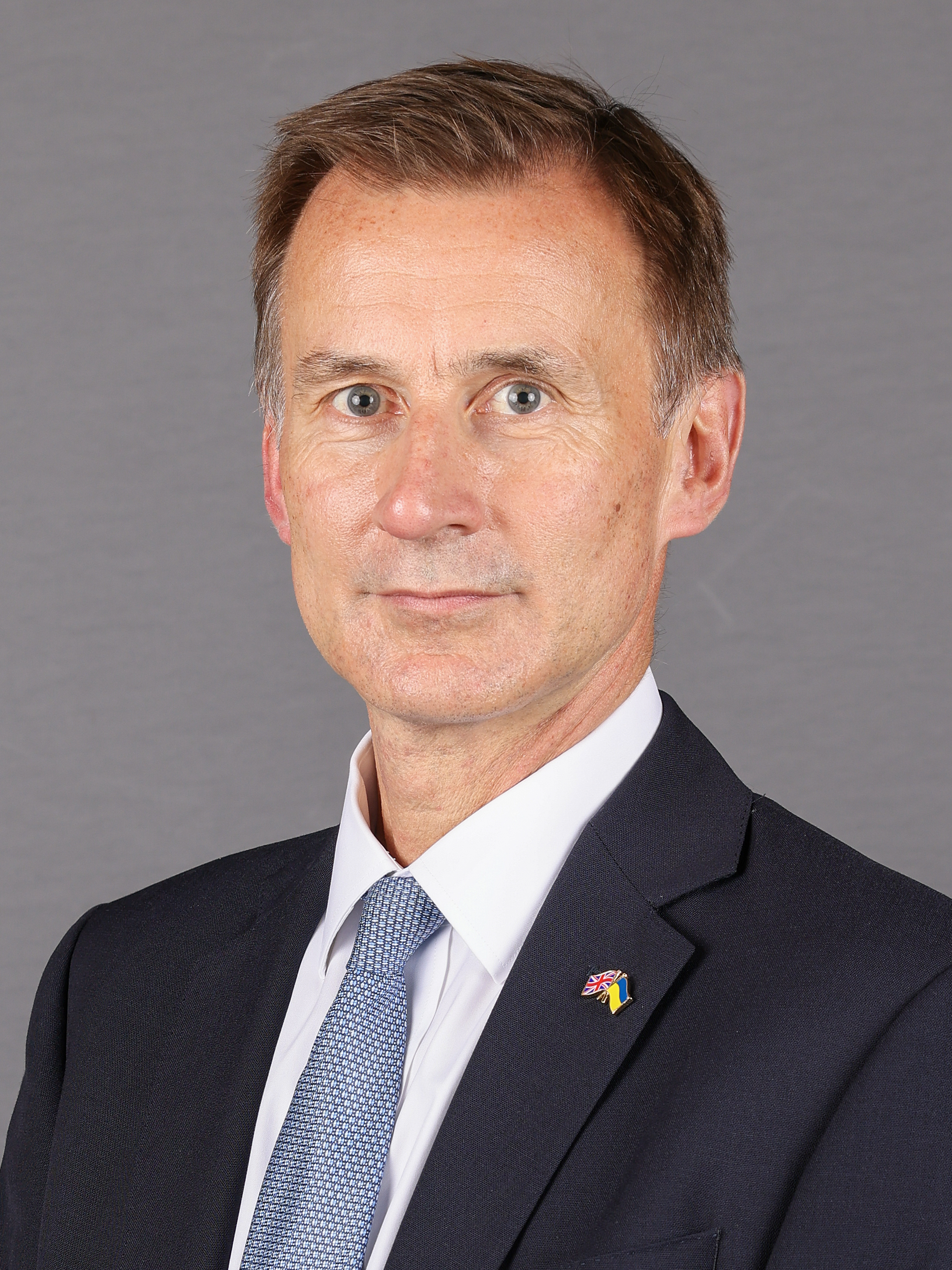
Sir Jeremy Hunt, former Chancellor of the Exchequer

- John Archer-Houblon (1773–1831), MP for Essex (1810–1820)
- William Bagot, 3rd Baron Bagot (1811–1887), MP for Denbighshire (1835–1852)
- Thomas Barrett-Lennard (1788–1856), MP for Ipswich (1820–1826) and Maldon (1826–1837; 1847–1852)
- Richard Fellowes Benyon (1811–1897), MP for Berkshire (1860–1876)
- Reginald Blaker (1900–1975), MP for Spelthorne (1931–1945)
- John Gordon Drummond Campbell (1864–1935), MP for Kingston-upon-Thames (1918–1922)
- Douglas Carswell (born 1971), MP for Harwich (2005–10) and Clacton (2010–17)
- Ronald Cartland (1907–1940), MP and rebel against Chamberlain's appeasement policies, killed near Dunkirk in 1940; portrayed in Lynne Olson's "Troublesome Young Men."
- Arthur Stuart, 7th Earl Castle Stewart (1889–1961), MP for Harborough
- Henry Cautley, 1st Baron Cautley (1863–1946), MP for Leeds East and East Grinstead
- Sir Charles Clifford, 4th Baronet (1821–1895), MP for Isle of Wight (1857–1865) and Newport (1870–1885)
- Thomas Cobbold (1833–1883), MP for Ipswich (1876–1883) and diplomat
- Anthony Coombs (born 1952), MP for Wyre Forest
- Coningsby Disraeli (1867–1936), MP for Altrincham
- Ralph Etherton (1904–1987), MP for Stretford
- Clavering Fison (1892–1985), MP for Woodbridge
- Walter Fletcher (1892–1956), MP for Bury (1945–1950) and Bury and Radcliffe (1950–1955)
- Stephen Furness (1902–1974), MP for Sunderland (1935–1945)
- Richard Gardner (1812–1856), MP for Leicester (1847–1848; 1852–1856)
- Mark Garnier (born 1963), MP for Wyre Forest
- George Gipps (1783–1869), MP for Ripon (1807–1826)
- Charles Goodson-Wickes DL (born 1945), former soldier, businessman, consulting physician, and former Conservative MP for Wimbledon
- Sir Douglas Hall, 1st Baronet (1866–1923), MP for Isle of Wight (1910–1922)
- Sir George Hamilton, 1st Baronet (1877–1947), MP for Altrincham (1913–1923) and Ilford (1928–1937)
- Henry Handley (1797–1846), MP for Heytesbury (1820–1826) and South Lincolnshire (1832–1841)
- George Harrison (1680–1759), MP for Hertford (1727–1734; 1741–1759)
- Edward Hicks (1814–1889), MP for Cambridgeshire (1879–1885)
- Frederick Hindle (1877–1953), MP for Darwen (1923–1924)
- Geoffrey Hirst (1904–1984), MP for Shipley (1950–1970)
- Kirkman Hodgson (1814–1879), MP for Bridport and Bristol, and Governor of the Bank of England
- Sir Henry Hoghton, 7th Baronet (1768–1835), MP for Preston (1795–1802)
- Henry Thomas Howard (1808–1851), MP for Cricklade (1841–1847)
- Sir Jeremy Hunt (born 1966), MP for Godalming and Ash, (previously South West Surrey), and former Chancellor of the Exchequer
- Edward John Hutchins (1809–1876), MP for Penryn and Falmouth (1840–1841) and Lymington (1850–1857)
- William Fletcher-Vane, 1st Baron Inglewood (1909–1989), MP for Westmorland and government minister
- John Jenkinson (1734?–1805), MP for Corfe Castle (1768–1780)
- Sir Geoffrey Johnson-Smith (1924–2010), MP for Holborn and St Pancras South, East Grinstead and Wealden
- David Jones (1810–1869), MP for Carmarthenshire (1852–1868)
- Sydney Jones (1872–1947), MP for Liverpool West Derby (1923–1924)
- Seymour King (1852–1933), MP for Kingston upon Hull Central (1885–1911)
- Timothy Kitson (1931–2019), MP for Richmond, North Yorkshire (1959–1983)
- Sir Frederick Knight (1812–1897), MP
- Sir Edmund Lechmere, 3rd Baronet (1826–1894), MP
- William Cunliffe Lister (1809–1841), MP for Bradford (1841)
- Lord Cecil Manners (1868–1945), MP for Melton (1900–1906)
- James Martin (1807–1878), MP for Tewkesbury (1859–1865)
- William Meeke (1758–1830), MP for Penryn (1796–1802)
- John Mills (1879–1972), MP for New Forest and Christchurch (1932–1945)
- John Pretyman Newman (1871–1947), MP for Enfield (1910–1918) and Finchley (1918–1923)
- Sir Charles Nicholson, 1st Baronet, of Harrington Gardens (1857–1918), MP for Doncaster (1906–1918)
- Reginald Nicholson (1869–1946), MP for Doncaster (1918–1922)
- George Palmer (1772–1853), MP for
- Thomas Erskine Perry (1806–1882), MP for Devonport (1854–1859)
- Vivian Phillipps (1870–1955), MP for Edinburgh West (1922–1924)
- Richard Pilkington (1908–1976), MP for Widnes (1935–1945) and Poole (1951–1964)
- William Pole-Carew (1811–1888), MP for East Cornwall (1845–1852)
- Rafton Pounder (1933–1991), MP for Belfast South (1963–1974)
- Uvedale Tomkins Price (1685–1764), MP for Weobley (1713–1715; 1727–1734)
- Jim Prior, Baron Prior (1927–2016), MP for Lowestoft and Waveney, Minister of Agriculture, Fisheries and Food (1970–72), Secretary of State for Employment (1979–81)
- David Ricardo (1803–1864), MP for Stroud (1832–1833)
- Thomas Rider (1785–1847), MP for Kent (1831–1832) and West Kent (1832–1835)
- Benjamin Rodwell (1815–1892), MP for Cambridgeshire (1874–1881)
- George Schuster (1881–1982), MP for Walsall (1938–1945)
- McInnes Shaw (1895–1957), MP for Western Renfrewshire (1924–1929)
- Sir John Shelley, 7th Baronet (1808–1867), MP for Gatton (1830–1831), Great Grimsby (1831–1832), and Westminster (1852–1865)
- Waldron Smithers (1880–1954), MP for Chislehurst (1924–1945) and Orpington (1945–1954)
- Edward Richard Stewart (1782–1851), MP for Wigtown Burghs (1806–1809)
- Dick Taverne, Baron Taverne, (born 1928), MP for Lincoln, founder of Democratic Labour, co-founder of the Institute for Fiscal Studies, and Liberal Democrat peer
- William Thompson (1792–1854), MP for Callington (1820–1826), London (1826–1832), Sunderland (1833–1841), and Westmorland (1841–1854), and Lord Mayor of London (1828–1829)
- Mike Thornton (born 1953), MP for Eastleigh
- Lord Edward Thynne (1807–1884), MP for Weobley (1831–1832) and Frome (1859–1865)
- Anthony Trafford, Baron Trafford (1932–1989), MP for The Wrekin
- George James Turner (1798–1867), MP
- Philip Twells (1808–1880), MP for City of London (1874–1880)
- Kenyon Vaughan-Morgan (1873–1933), MP for Fulham East (1922–1933)
- John Wakeham, Baron Wakeham, (born 1932), MP for Maldon and South Colchester and Maldon and government minister
- Thomas Spencer Wilson (1727–1798), MP for Sussex (1774–1780)
- Henry Wilson-Fox (1863–1921), MP for Tamworth
- Ian Winterbottom, Baron Winterbottom (1913–1992), MP for Nottingham Central
- Edmund Workman-Macnaghten (1790–1876), MP for Antrim (1847–1852)
- Tim Yeo (born 1945), MP for South Suffolk and former chairman of the Energy and Climate Change Select Committee
- Henry Redhead Yorke (1802–1848), MP for City of York (1841–1848)
- Robert Curzon, 14th Baron Zouche (1810–1873), MP for Clitheroe

=== Political scholars, activists, and others ===
- John Campbell (born 1947), political writer and biographer
- Adam Curle (1916–2006), British academic and Quaker peace activist
- Goldsworthy Lowes Dickinson (1862–1932), political scholar
- Charles Evenden (1894–1961), British soldier who was the founder of the Memorable Order of Tin Hats
- Garry Thomson (1925–2007), British conservator and Buddhist
- Patrick Trevor-Roper (1916–2004), British eye surgeon and pioneer gay rights activist (witness before the Wolfenden Committee)

== Royalty ==
- Yashwant Rao Holkar II (1908–1961), Maharaja of Indore
- Prince Albert of Schleswig-Holstein (1869–1931), grandson of Queen Victoria
- Prince Dilok Nobaratana (1884–1912), son of King Rama V of Siam

== Nobility ==
- Sir Robert Abdy, 5th Baronet (1896–1976)
- Niall Campbell, 10th Duke of Argyll (1872–1949), hereditary peer
- Peter Baden-Powell, 2nd Baron Baden-Powell (1913–1962), hereditary peer
- Maxwell Aitken, 3rd Baron Beaverbrook (born 1951), hereditary peer
- Adrian Buckmaster, 4th Viscount Buckmaster (born 1949), hereditary peer
- Horace Lambart, 11th Earl of Cavan (1878–1950), Irish peer
- Sir Charles Clarke, 2nd Baronet (1812–1899)
- Robert Boyle, 11th Earl of Cork (1864–1934)
- Mark Pepys, 6th Earl of Cottenham (1903–1943), racing driver
- Edward Law, 5th Baron Ellenborough (1841–1915)
- Charles Campbell, 2nd Baron Glenavy (1885–1963), hereditary peer
- David Hacking, 3rd Baron Hacking (born 1938), hereditary peer
- Walter Angelo Fox-Strangways, 8th Earl of Ilchester (1887–1970)
- Richard Milner, 3rd Baron Milner of Leeds (born 1959), hereditary peer
- Simon Russell, 3rd Baron Russell of Liverpool (born 1952), crossbench peer
- Granville Eliot, 7th Earl of St Germans (1867–1942), hereditary peer
- Montague Eliot, 8th Earl of St Germans (1870–1960), hereditary peer
- Sir Gervais Tennyson d'Eyncourt, 2nd Baronet (1902–1971), landowner, Prime Warden of the Worshipful Company of Fishmongers
- Henry Fowler, 2nd Viscount Wolverhampton (1870–1943), hereditary peer

== Royal household and ceremonial positions ==
- Sir (Marsom) Henry Boyd-Carpenter (born 1939), courtier
- Hubert Chesshyre (1940–2020), courtier
- John Donaldson, Baron Donaldson of Lymington (1920–2005), Master of the Rolls
- Arthur Erskine (1881–1963), Crown Equerry (1924–1941)
- Charles Jenkinson, 3rd Earl of Liverpool (1784–1851), Lord Steward (1841–1846)
- Derek Keppel (1863–1944), Master of the Household (1913–1936)
- David McCorkell (born 1955), Lord-Lieutenant of County Antrim and former Board Director of Brewin Dolphin plc
- John Fane, 10th Earl of Westmorland (1759–1841), Lord-Lieutenant of Ireland, 1789–1794, and Lord Privy Seal, 1798–1827
- Fiske Goodeve Fiske-Harrison (1793–1872), High Sheriff of Essex (1827)
- Charles Young (1795–1869), Garter Principal King of Arms (1842–1869)

== Colonial administration ==
- John Adam (1779–1825), acting Governor-General of the British East India Company (1823)
- Oswald Raynor Arthur (1905–1973), Governor of the Falkland Islands (1954–1957) and Governor of the Bahamas (1957–1960)
- Edward Beetham (1905–1979), Governor of the Windward Islands (1953–1955) and Governor of Trinidad and Tobago (1955–1960)
- James Samuel Berridge (1806–1885), Governor of Saint Christopher (1872–1873)
- George Bowen (1821–1899), Chief Secretary of the Ionian Islands, 1854–1859, first Governor of Queensland, 1859–1867, Governor of New Zealand, 1867–1873, Governor of Victoria, 1873–1879, Governor of Mauritius, 1879–1882, and Governor of Hong Kong, 1882–1885
- Cavendish Boyle (1849–1916), Governor of Newfoundland (1901–1904) and of Mauritius (1904–1911)
- Sir Henry Ernest Gascoyne Bulwer (1836–1914), Governor of Natal 1882–1885
- Major-General Sir James Carmichael-Smyth, 1st Baronet (1779–1838), Governor of the Bahamas (1829–1833) and Governor of British Guiana (1833–1838)
- Geoffrey Francis Taylor Colby (1901–1958), Governor of Nyasaland (1948–1956)
- Elliot James Dowell Colvin (1885–1950), Chief Minister of Jammu and Kashmir
- Robert Henry Davies (1824–1902), Lieutenant-Governor of the Punjab (1871–1877)
- William Des Vœux (1834–1909), Administrator of St Lucia, 1869–1878, Governor of Fiji, 1880–1885, Governor of Newfoundland, 1886–1887, and Governor of Hong Kong, 1887–1891
- Lieutenant-General Sir William Dobbie (1879–1964), Inspector, Royal Engineers, 1933–1935, General Officer Commanding Malaya and Singapore, 1935–1939, and Governor-General of Malta, 1940–1942
- Edward Hay Drummond Hay (1815–1884), President of the British Virgin Islands (1839–1850), Lieutenant Governor of Saint Christopher (1850–1855), and Governor of Saint Helena (1856–1863)
- Charles Du Cane (1825–1889), Governor of Tasmania (1869–1874)
- Peter Fawcus (1915–2003), Resident Commissioner of Bechuanaland (1960–1965)
- Laurence Guillemard (1862–1951), British High Commissioner in Malaya (1920–1927)
- Frederick Seton James (1870–1934), Colonial Secretary of the Straits Settlements (1916–1924) and Governor of the Windward Islands (1924–1930)
- Henry Lushington (1812–1855), Chief Secretary of Malta, 1847–1855
- Henry Augustus Marshall (c. 1776–1841), Civil Auditor General (1823–1841)
- Field Marshal Sir George Nugent, 1st Baronet (1757–1849), Lieutenant-Governor of Jamaica, 1801–1806, and Commander-in-Chief in India, 1811–1813
- Aubrey Metcalfe (1883–1957), Chief Commissioner of Baluchistan (1939–1943)
- Arthur Wigram Money (1866–1951), Chief Administrator of Palestine (1918–1919)
- John Giles Price (1808–1857), British penal governor at Norfolk Island
- Leslie Probyn (1862–1938), Governor of Sierra Leone (1904–1910) and Governor of Jamaica (1918–1924)
- Arthur Somers-Cocks, 6th Baron Somers (1887–1944), Governor of Victoria, 1926–1931, Deputy Chief Scout, 1936–1941, and Chief Scout, 1941–1944
- Lieutenant-General Sir Henry Knight Storks (1811–1874), last High Commissioner for the Ionian Islands, 1859–1863, Governor of Malta, 1864–1865, Governor of Jamaica, 1864–1866, Controller-in-Chief of the War Office, 1866–1870, and Surveyor-General of the Ordnance, 1870–1874
- Ronald Storrs (1881–1955), Oriental Secretary in Cairo, 1909–1915, Governor of Jerusalem, 1917–1926, Governor of Cyprus, 1926–1932, and Governor of Northern Rhodesia, 1932–1934
- John Sturrock (1875–1937), Resident Commissioner in Basutoland (1926–1935)
- Sir Charles Trevelyan, 1st Baronet (1807–1886), Assistant Secretary to HM Treasury & responsible for famine relief during the Irish famine, 1840–1859, Governor of Madras, 1859–1860, and Minister of Finance of India, 1862–1865
- William Douglas Young (1859–1943), Governor of the Falkland Islands

== Diplomats ==
- Sir John Banham (1940–2022), diplomat and business leader
- James Bowker (1901–1983), UK Ambassador to Burma (1948–1950), Turkey (1954–1958), and Austria (1958–1961)
- Francis Cornish (born 1942), diplomat and courtier
- Sir Frederick Currie, 1st Baronet (1799–1875), British diplomat
- Thomas Drew (1970–), British High Commissioner to Pakistan (2016–present) and Principal Private Secretary to the Secretary of State for Foreign and Commonwealth Affairs (2012–2014)
- Gai Eaton (1921–2010), diplomat, writer and Sufist Islamic scholar
- Sir Leonard Figg (1923–2014), diplomat
- William Kerr Fraser-Tytler (1886–1963), envoy to Afghanistan (1935–1941)
- Donald Gainer (1891–1966), British ambassador to Venezuela (1939–1944), Brazil (1944–1947), and Poland (1947–1950)
- George Dixon Grahame (1873–1940), UK Ambassador to Belgium (1920) and UK Ambassador to Spain (1928–1935)
- John Hay Drummond Hay (1816–1893), British Ambassador to Morocco (1845–1886)
- George Labouchère (1905–1999), British diplomat and collector of modern art
- Ronald Macleay (1870–1943), British diplomat
- Guy Millard (1917–2013), British diplomat
- Hubert Montgomery (1876–1942), Ambassador to the Netherlands
- William Frederick Travers O'Connor (1870–1943), Irish diplomat involved in the British expedition to Tibet and the Nepal–Britain Treaty of 1923
- Augustus Paget (1823–1896), British Ambassador to Austria-Hungary (1884–1893)
- David Aubrey Scott (1919–2010), High Commissioner to New Zealand (1973–1975) and British Ambassador to South Africa (1976–1979)
- Walford Selby (1881–1965), British diplomat
- Sir Eric Teichman (1884–1944), diplomat and traveller in Central Asia, Chinese Secretary in Peking, 1922–1936
- Michael Walker (1916–2001), High Commissioner to Ceylon/Sri Lanka (1962–1966), Malaysia (1966–1971), and India (1974–1976)
- Charles Wingfield (1877–1960), British diplomat

== Civil servants ==
- Sir George Barrow, 2nd Baronet (1806–1876), civil servant
- William Beveridge, 1st Baron Beveridge (1879–1963), civil servant, politician, economist and social reformer, Permanent Secretary to the Ministry of Food, 1919, director of the London School of Economics, 1919–1937, and Master of University College, Oxford, 1937–1944
- James Brooks (1863–1941), Director of Victualling (1911–1923)
- Harry Chester (1806–1868), Secretary to the Privy Council
- Richard Dean (1772–1850), British civil servant
- Denis Dobson (1908–1995), Permanent Secretary to the Lord Chancellor's Office (1968–1977)
- George Engle (1926–2016), First Parliamentary Counsel (1981–1987)
- Edward Anthony Hawke (1895–1964), Common Serjeant of London and Recorder of London
- Neville Leigh (1922–1994), Clerk of the Privy Council (1974–1984)
- Evan MacGregor (1842–1926), British civil servant
- Sir William Hay Macnaghten (1793–1841), Chief Secretary, Indian Secret and Political Department, 1833–1841
- Sir Thomas William Clinton Murdoch (1809-1891), Chief Secretary, Governor General of British North America
- Samuel March Phillipps (1780–1862), English civil servant
- Sir Reginald Palgrave (1829–1904), Clerk of the House of Commons, 1886–1900
- C. K. Rhodes (1889–1941), British civil servant for the Indian Civil Service
- Martin Rowlands (1925–2004), Secretary for the Civil Service in Hong Kong (1978–1985)
- Patrick Shovelton (1919–2012), British civil servant and transport executive
- Sir Charles Trevelyan (1807–1886) Administrator of relief during the Irish potato blight famine who believed that the disaster was God's judgement. Also during Highland Potato Famine.
- Sir John Lovegrove Waldron (1910–1975), Commissioner of the Metropolitan Police, 1968–1972

== Businesspeople ==
- Eric Vansittart Bowater (1895–1962), English businessmen who was CEO and chairman of Bowater
- Christopher Buxton (1929–2017), British property developer who pioneered the subdivision of English country houses into smaller units that enabled their owners to continue to live in part of their former home
- John Cazenove (1788–1879), English businessman and political economist
- Ian Davies (born 1951), chairman of Rolls-Royce Group plc
- Basil Eddis (1881–1971), Anglo-Indian businessman who was president of the Bengal Chamber of Commerce and Industry (1927–1928)
- Charles Engelhard Jr. (1917–1971), American businessman, horse racer and political candidate
- Dudley Hooper (1911–1968), British accountant, early promoter of electronic data processing, and President of the British Computer Society
- Philip Jeyaretnam (born 1964), Singaporean businessman and CEO of Dentons
- William Madocks (1773–1828), property developer and politician, founder of Tremadog and Porthmadog
- Sir William McAlpine, 6th Baronet (1936–2018), British businessman who was director of Sir Robert McAlpine
- John Murray III (1808–1892), British publisher associated with the company of the same name
- Anthony Nares (1942–1996), British publisher
- Robin Niblett (born 1961), Director of Chatham House
- Archie Norman (born 1954), businessman, chairman of ITV plc and former Conservative MP for Tunbridge Wells
- Harry Oppenheimer (1908–2000), Chairman of De Beers
- Shirish Saraf (born 1967), entrepreneur
- Peter de Savary (1944–2022), entrepreneur and former chairman of Millwall F.C.
- George Samuel Fereday Smith (1812–1891), industrialist and canal manager
- Brian Harold Thomson (1918–2006), British newspaper proprietor for DC Thomson

== Economists, financiers and bankers ==
- William Blake (1774–1852), English classical economist who contributed to the early theory of purchasing power parity
- Ronald Colville, 2nd Baron Clydesmuir (1917–1996), soldier, Governor of the Bank of Scotland
- Brien Cokayne, 1st Baron Cullen of Ashbourne (1864–1932), Governor of the Bank of England
- Arthur Lowes Dickinson (1859–1935), British chartered accountant who was senior partner of Price Waterhouse
- Maurice Dobb (1900–1976), economist
- Sir John Gieve KCB, (born 1950), Deputy Governor of the Bank of England
- Jonathan Goodwin (born 1975), British banker and investor
- Robert Neild (1924–2018), Cambridge economist and peace researcher
- Sir Inglis Palgrave (1827–1919), economist and banker
- John Horsley Palmer (1779–1858), Governor of the Bank of England

== Academics ==
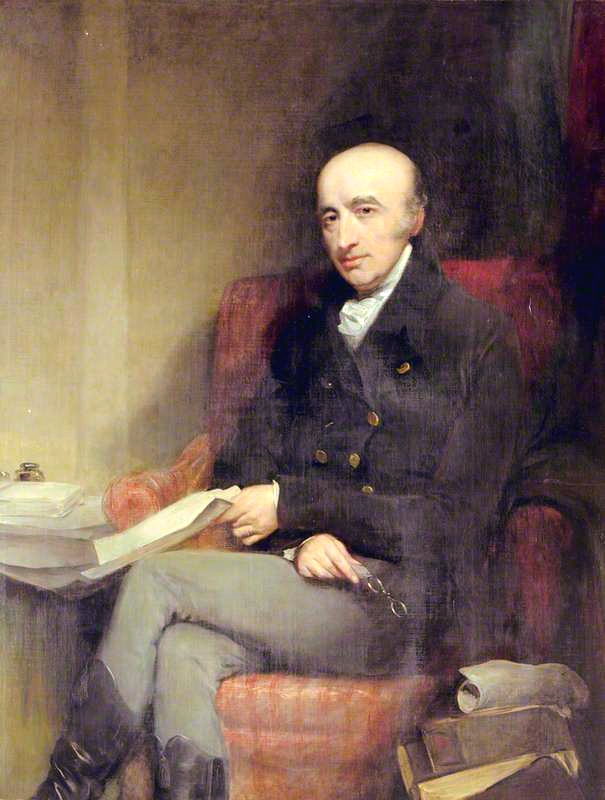
President of the Royal Society William Hyde Wollaston

- Sheldon Amos (1835–1886), Professor of Jurisprudence, University College, London, 1869–1879, and University of London, 1873–1879, and lawyer and judge in Egypt
- Cardale Babington (1808–1895), Professor of Botany, University of Cambridge, 1861–1895
- Gregory Bateson (1904–1980), anthropologist and co-founder of cybernetics
- Sir William Blackstone (1723–1780), first Vinerian Professor of English Law, University of Oxford, 1758–1766, politician and judge
- Richard Lynch Cotton (1794–1880), Vice-Chancellor of the University of Oxford
- Edward Craig (born 1942), English academic philosopher, editor of the Routledge Encyclopedia of Philosophy, and cricketer who played one List-A and 50 first-class matches
- John Davies (1679–1732), Vice-Chancellor of the University of Cambridge
- Edward Eastwick (1814–1883), orientalist, diplomat and politician, Professor of Urdu, East India College, 1845–1857
- Sir Alan Gardiner (1879–1963), Egyptologist
- Herbert Giles (1845–1935), Sinologist, Professor of Chinese, University of Cambridge, 1897–1932, co-inventor of Wade–Giles transliteration system
- Geoffrey Gorer (1905–1985), anthropologist and author
- Thomas Greaves (1612–1676), English orientalist and a contributor to the London Polyglot
- Philip Seaforth James (1914–2001), an English Lawyer and Academic
- John Robert Kenyon (1807–1880), Vinerian Professor of English Law (1844–1880)
- Henry Liddell (1811–1898), Dean of Christ Church, Oxford, 1855–1891, editor of the Greek-English Lexicon
- Edmund Law Lushington (1811–1893), Rector of the University of Glasgow (1884–1887)
- John Sinclair Morrison (1913–2000), Professor of Greek, University of Durham, 1945–1950, Vice-Master of Churchill College, Cambridge, 1960–1965, first President of University College (later Wolfson College), Cambridge, 1965–1980, expert on Greek triremes
- Paul Oppé (1878–1957), English art historian, critic, art collector and museum official
- Arthur Rook (1918–1991), British dermatologist and the principal author of Rook's Textbook of Dermatology
- Kenneth Searight (1883–1957), linguist
- Horace Geoffrey Quaritch Wales (1900–1981), Southeast Asian studies
- Patrick Wilkinson, classical scholar
- Francis Wollaston (1762–1823), Jacksonian Professor of Natural Philosophy, University of Cambridge, 1792–1813
- Henry Cecil Kennedy Wyld (1870–1945), philologist and lexicographer, first Baines Professor of English Language and Philology, University of Liverpool, 1904–1920, Merton Professor of English Language and Literature, University of Oxford, 1920–1945

=== Education leaders ===
- Samuel Berdmore (1739–1802), Master of Charterhouse School, 1769–1802
- William Lloyd Birkbeck (1806–1888), Master of Downing College, Cambridge (1885–1888)
- Ronald Burrows (1867–1920), Principal of King's College London (1913–1920)
- Warin Foster Bushell (1885–1974), educationalist and president of the Mathematical Association
- Walter Empson (1856–1934), New Zealand headmaster
- Andrew Graham (born 1942), Master of Balliol College, Oxford
- Michael Hoban (1921–2003), headmaster of Harrow School
- Sir Cyril Jackson (educationist) (1863–1924), Inspector-General of Schools, Western Australia, 1896–1903, Chief Inspector of Elementary Schools, 1903–1905, and Chairman of London County Council, 1915–?
- Edmund Keene (1714–1781), Vice-Chancellor of the University of Cambridge, Bishop of Chester and Bishop of Ely
- John King (c. 1655–1737), Master of Charterhouse 1715–1737
- Alexander Nowell (c. 1517–1602), Principal of Brasenose College, Oxford (1595–1596)
- J. F. Roxburgh (1888–1954), first head master of Stowe School, 1923–1949
- John Russell (1787–1863), Headmaster of Charterhouse
- Augustus Saunders (1801–1878), Headmaster of Charterhouse
- Andrew Tooke (1673–1732), headmaster of Charterhouse (1728–1732), Gresham Professor of Geometry, Fellow of the Royal Society and translator of Tooke's Pantheon
- George Waddington (1793–1869), Warden of Durham University (1862–1869)

=== Scientists ===
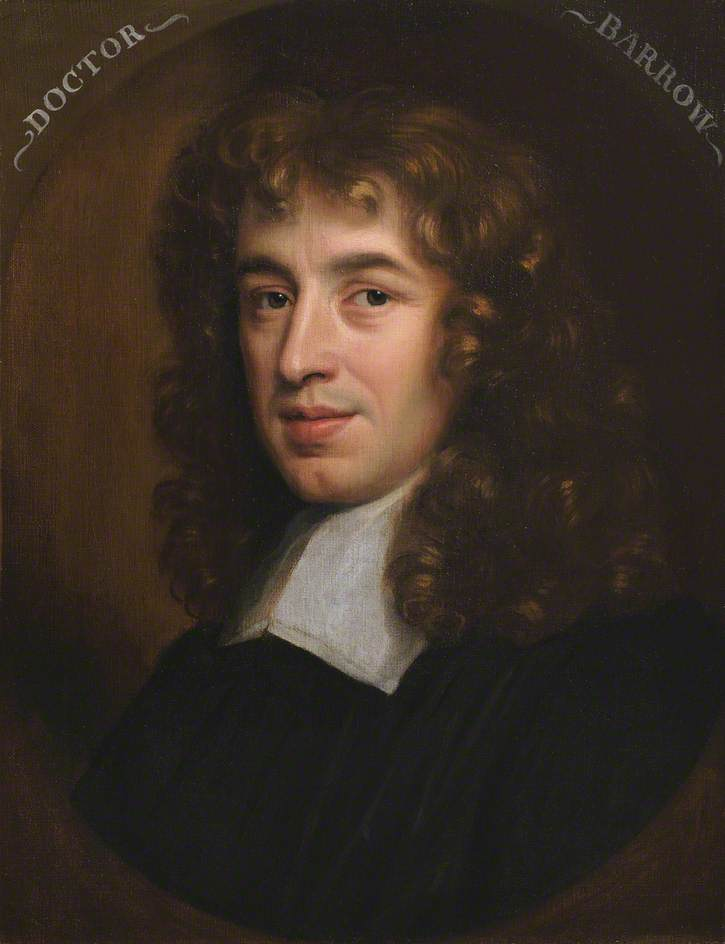
Mathematician Isaac Barrow

- Max Barclay (born 1970), entomologist
- Isaac Barrow (1630–1677), mathematician and theologian
- Richard Henry Beddome (1830–1911), British naturalist who was chief conservator of the Madras Forest Department
- Hugh Bostock (born 1944), British neuroscientist and emeritus professor of neurophysiology at University College, London
- James Clark (born 1964), British computer programmer known for his open-source software work and writing groff
- J. Norman Collie (1859–1942), organic chemist and mountaineer, Professor of Organic Chemistry, University College, London, 1902–1928
- Charles John Cornish (1858–1906), English naturalist and author
- William Rutter Dawes (1799–1868), astronomer
- Edward A. Guggenheim (1901–1970), English physical chemist noted for his contributions to thermodynamics
- William Hamilton (1805–1867), geologist and politician
- Sir Henry Head (1861–1940), neurologist
- George Hampson (1860–1936), British entomologist
- Henry Hayter (1821–1895), English-born Australian statistician
- Terence Kealey (born 1952), biochemist
- Bernard Kettlewell (1907–1979), lepidopterist
- Robert Heath Lock (1879–1915), English botanist and geneticist who wrote the first English textbook on genetics
- C. N. H. Lock (1894–1949), English aerodynamicist
- Guy Anstruther Knox Marshall (1871–1959), Indian-born British entomologist and authority on Curculionidae
- Peter Nye (1921–2009), soil scientist
- Chris Perrins (born 1935), ornithologist and Her Majesty's Warden of the Swans
- Bruce Ponder (born 1944), English geneticist and cancer researcher
- Sir Oliver Scott (1922–2016), radiobiologist
- William Fleetwood Sheppard (1863–1936), Australian-British mathematician and statistician known for Sheppard's correction
- James Smithson (1764–1829), mineralogist, traveller and founder of the Smithsonian Institution (probable Old Carthusian)
- William Hyde Wollaston (1766–1828), metallurgist, crystallographer and physiologist, discoverer of palladium and rhodium, researcher into platinum
- James Wood-Mason (1846–1893), English zoologist who was the director of the Indian Museum at Calcutta

=== Engineers ===
- Geoffrey Binnie (1908–1989), British civil engineer
- Colonel Sir Proby Cautley (1802–1871), civil engineer and palaeontologist, Superintendent of the Doab Canal, India, 1831–1843, and Superintendent of Canals, North-Western Provinces, 1843–1854, architect of the Ganges Canal
- George Thomas Clark (1809–1898), civil engineer and antiquary, Manager, Dowlais Ironworks, 1855–1897
- John Dewrance (1858–1937), British inventor and mechanical engineer
- Sir Eustace Tennyson d'Eyncourt FRS (1868–1951), distinguished British Naval Architect and Engineer and Director of naval Construction for the Royal Navy 1912–1924.
- Alfred Giles (1816–1895), President of the Institution of Civil Engineers (1893–1894) and MP for Southampton (1878–1880; 1883–1892)
- Francis McClean (1876–1955), British civil engineer and pioneer aviator
- Robert Sinclair (1817–1898), Locomotive Superintendent of the Caledonian Railway (1847–1856), of the Eastern Counties Railway (1856–1862), and of the Great Eastern Railway (1862–1865)
- Wallace Thorneycroft (1864–1954), President of the Institution of Mining Engineers

=== Physicians ===
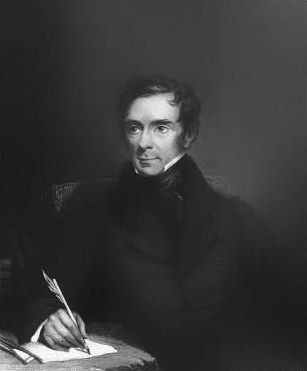
President of the Royal Society Sir Benjamin Collins Brodie, 1st Baronet

- George Francis Abercrombie (1896–1976), British physician who co-founded the Royal College of General Practitioners
- Benjamin Guy Babington (1794–1866), physician and orientalist, inventor of the laryngoscope
- John Carr Badeley (1794–1851), English physician
- Sir Benjamin Collins Brodie, 1st Baronet (1783–1862), surgeon and physiologist, Sergeant-Surgeon to William IV and Queen Victoria, 1832–1862
- Sir Farquhar Buzzard (1871–1945), physician, Regius Professor of Medicine, University of Oxford, 1928–1943
- Thomas Spencer Cobbold (1828–1886), first Professor of Helminthology, Royal Veterinary College, 1873–1886
- Sir Thomas Gery Cullum (1741–1831), surgeon, botanist, and Bath King of Arms, 1771–1800
- David Dane (1923–1998), virologist
- Arthur Farre (1811–1887), English obstetric physician
- Frederic John Farre (1804–1886), English physician
- Edward Price Furber (1864–1940), British obstetrician and surgeon
- Peter Alfred Gorer (1907–1961), British immunologist and pioneer of transplant immunology
- William Heberden the Younger (1767–1845), physician to George III
- John Hunt, Baron Hunt of Fawley (1905–1987), founder of the Royal College of General Practitioners
- Henry Levett (1668–1725), chief physician, Charterhouse 1712–1725
- Archie Norman (1912–2016), British paediatrician
- George Edward Paget (1809–1892), English physician and academic
- William Wyatt Pinching (1851–1878), surgeon and early rugby union international who represented England in 1872.
- David Prior, Baron Prior of Brampton (born 1954), current chair of NHS England, chairman of University College Hospital, and MP for North Norfolk (1997–2001)
- Sir Harold Ridley (1906–2001), ophthalmic surgeon, inventor of the intraocular lens implant
- W. H. C. Romanis (1889–1972), British surgeon and medical author
- William Henry Stone (1830–1891), English physician known for his studies on electro-therapy and the electrical properties of the human body
- Thomas Hawkes Tanner (1824–1871), physician and medical writer
- Hubert Maitland Turnbull (1875–1955), British pathologist
- William Watson (1744–1824), English physician, naturalist, and Mayor of Bath (1801)
- Frederick Parkes Weber (1863–1962), English dermatologist

=== Philosophers ===
- David Bostock (1936–2019), philosopher
- Don Cupitt (1934–2025), philosopher of religion and Christian theologian
- Walking Stewart (1747–1822), philosopher, traveller and eccentric
- Richard Swinburne (born 1934), philosopher and Christian apologist

=== Historians and antiquaries ===
- Henry Balfour (1863–1939), British archaeologist, the first curator of the Pitt Rivers Museum and President of the Royal Anthropological Institute of Great Britain and Ireland
- James Bindley (1737–1818), English antiquary and book collector
- Rawdon Brown (1806–1883), historian in Venice
- George Burges (1785 or 1786–1864), classicist
- Charles Burney (1757–1817), English classical scholar who gathered the Burney Collection of Newspapers
- Eric Christiansen (1937–2016), British medieval historian
- Peter Cowie (born 1939), film historian
- George Dennis (1814–1898), archaeologist and diplomat
- John Ehrman (1920–2011), historian and biographer of William Pitt the Younger
- I. H. N. Evans (1886–1957), British anthropologist, ethnographer and archaeologist
- Professor Peter Green (1924–2024), classical scholar, historian and Fellow of the Royal Society of Literature
- George Grote (1794–1871), historian and radical politician
- John Edward Jackson (1805–1891), archivist at Longleat
- Sir Richard Claverhouse Jebb (1841–1905), classicist and politician, Professor of Greek, University of Glasgow, 1875–1889, and Regius Professor of Greek, University of Cambridge, 1889–1905
- T. D. Kendrick (1895–1979), British archaeologist and art historian
- G. E. R. Lloyd (born 1933), English historian
- Sir Ellis Minns (1874–1953), archaeologist and palaeographer, Disney Professor of Archaeology, University of Cambridge, 1927–1939
- Henry Nettleship (1839–1893), classicist, Corpus Christi Professor of Latin, University of Oxford, 1878–1893
- Francis Peck (1692–1743), antiquary
- Charles Reed Peers (1868–1952), English architect and archaeologist
- Michael Prestwich (born 1943), former professor of Medieval History at the University of Durham
- George Cecil Renouard (1780–1867), classicist and orientalist
- Henry Thomas Riley (1816–1878), English translator and antiquary
- Joseph Rykwert (1926–2024), English architectural historian
- Sir Richard Sorabji (born 1934), historian of ancient philosophy
- Maxwell Staniforth (1893–1985), British scholar and writer
- Lawrence Stone (1919–1999), historian and Dodge Professor of History, Princeton University, 1963–1990
- Hugh Trevor-Roper (1914–2003), historian of early modern Britain and Nazi Germany, Regius Professor of Modern History at Oxford, later Baron Dacre of Glanton
- Simon Walker (1958–2004), British historian of late medieval England
- Robert Walpole (1781–1856), English classical scholar
- T. B. L. Webster (1905–1974), British archaeologist who studied Greek comedy
- Daniel Wray (1701–1783), English antiquary
- Claud William Wright (1917–2010), British civil servant, palaeontologist and archaeologist

== Judges, barristers, and lawyers ==
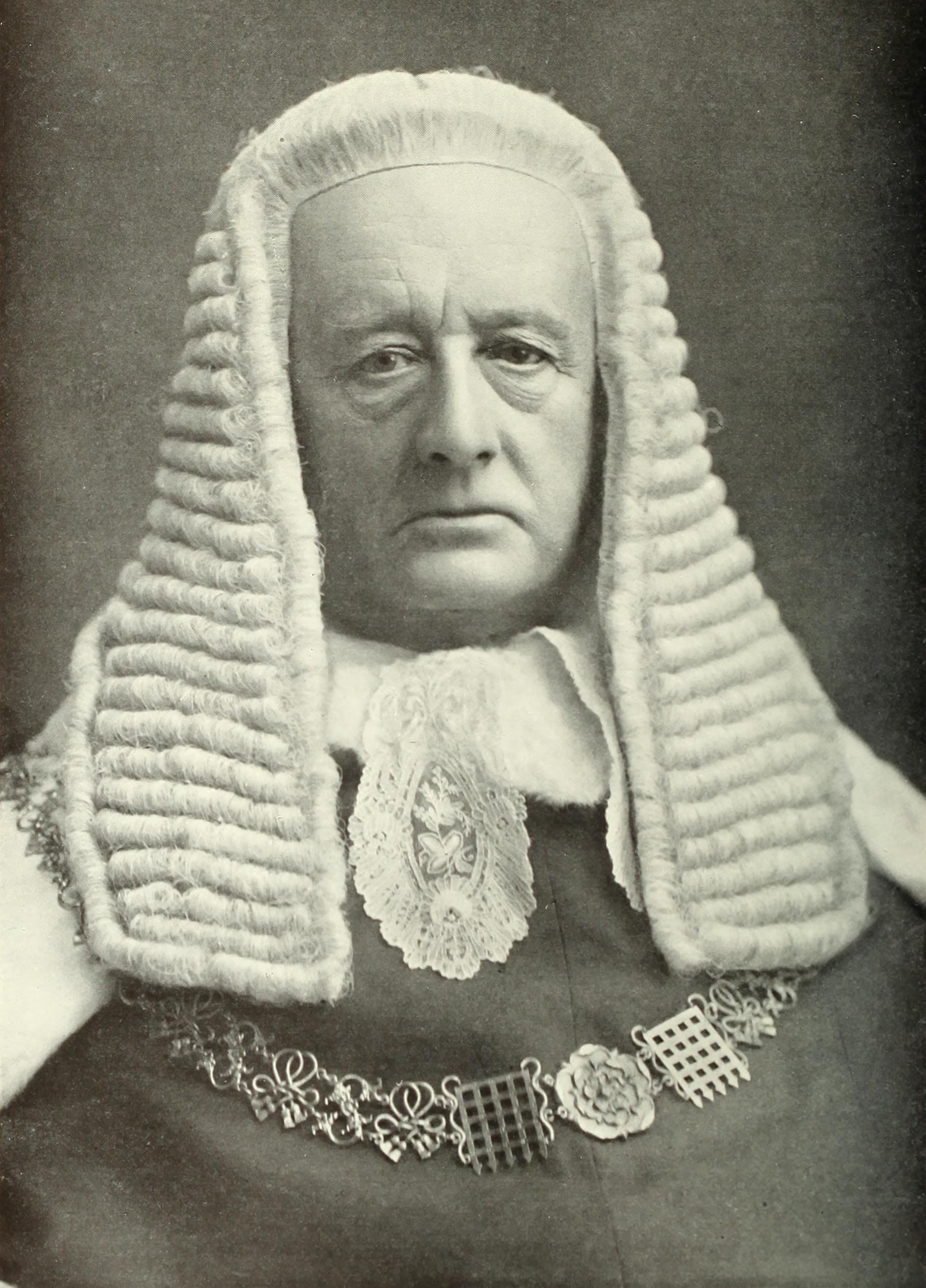
Attorney General, Master of the Rolls and Lord Chief Justice Richard Webster, 1st Viscount Alverstone

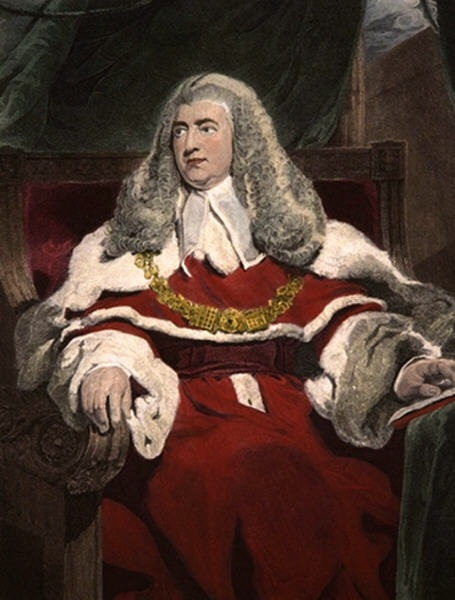
Attorney General and Lord Chief Justice Edward Law, 1st Baron Ellenborough

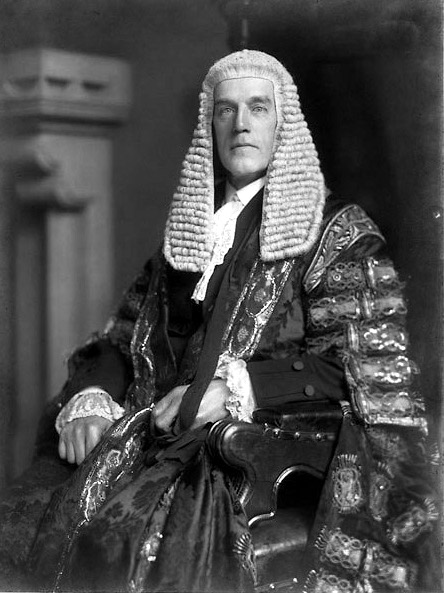
Attorney General and Master of the Rolls Ernest Pollock, 1st Viscount Hanworth

- Sir Edward Hall Alderson (c. 1787–1857), judge
- Richard Webster, 1st Viscount Alverstone (1842–1915), judge and politician, Attorney-General, 1885–1886, 1886–1892, 1895–1900, Master of the Rolls, 1900, and Lord Chief Justice, 1900–1913
- Joseph Arnould (1813–1886), British judge in India and great-uncle of Laurence Olivier
- William Henry Ashurst (1725–1807), English judge
- Sir Philip Bailhache KC (born 1946), Bailiff of Jersey and later Minister for External Relations
- Sir William Bailhache KC (born 1953), Bailiff of Jersey
- Edward Bearcroft (1737–1796), Chief Justice of Chester (1788–1796) and MP for Hindon (1784–1790) and Saltash (1790–1796)
- Michael Briggs, Lord Briggs of Westbourne (born 1954), Justice of the High Court
- Alfred Townsend Bucknill (1880–1963), English judge specialising in maritime law
- John Alexander Strachey Bucknill (1873–1926), Attorney General of Hong Kong
- James Cockle (1819–1895), Chief Justice of Queensland (1863–1879) and mathematician
- Cresswell Cresswell (1793–1863), judge and politician
- Nigel Davis (born 1951), Lord Justice of Appeal
- Edward Law, 1st Baron Ellenborough (1750–1818), Lord Chief Justice, 1802–1818
- Robert Fane (1796–1864), English judge
- John Fonblanque (1787–1865), barrister and legal writer
- Charles Freshfield (1808–1891), solicitor
- Henry Ray Freshfield (1814–1895), solicitor and conservationist
- Ralph Gibson (1922–2003), Lord Justice of Appeal (1985–1994)
- Peston Padamji Ginwala (1918–2008), barrister
- Sir Henry Gollan (1868–1949), Chief Justice of various British colonies, retired as Chief Justice of the Supreme Court of Hong Kong
- Sir James Goss Kt KC (born 1953), Justice of the High Court
- Harold Hanbury (1898–1993), jurist, Vinerian Professor of English Law, University of Oxford, 1949–1964
- Ernest Pollock, 1st Viscount Hanworth (1861–1936), judge and politician, Solicitor-General, 1919–1922, Attorney-General, 1922, and Master of the Rolls, 1923–1935
- Patrick Hastings (1880–1952), barrister and politician, first Labour Attorney-General, 1924
- Lionel Heald (1897–1981), barrister and politician, Attorney-General, 1951–1954
- John Hill (1912–2007), barrister, farmer and Conservative MP for South Norfolk
- Milner Holland (1902–1969), Attorney-General of the Duchy of Lancaster (1951–1969)
- David Jenkins, Baron Jenkins (1899–1969), Attorney-General of the Duchy of Lancaster
- Charles Shaw, Baron Kilbrandon (1906–1989), advocate and judge, Dean of the Faculty of Advocates, 1957–1959, Lord of Session, 1959–1965, Chairman of the Scottish Law Commission, 1965–1971, and Lord of Appeal in Ordinary, 1971–1976
- Alfred Lutwyche (1810–1880), first judge of the Supreme Court of Queensland
- Herbert William Malkin (1883–1945), Legal Adviser to the Foreign and Commonwealth Office (1929–1945)
- Jonathan Mance, Baron Mance (born 1943), Law Lord and Justice of the Supreme Court of the United Kingdom
- John McNeill QC (1899–1982), Crown Advocate of the British Supreme Court for China and chairman of the Hong Kong Bar Association
- S. F. C. Milsom (1923–2016), English legal historian
- Basil Montagu (1770–1851), author, barrister and Accountant-General in Bankruptcy, 1835–1846
- J. H. C. Morris (1910–1984), British legal scholar best known for his contributions to the conflict of laws
- Kenneth Muir Mackenzie, 1st Baron Muir Mackenzie (1845–1930), barrister and civil servant, Clerk of the Crown in Chancery, 1880–1915, and Permanent Secretary to the Lord Chancellor, 1884–1915
- Montague Muir Mackenzie (1847–1919), Scottish barrister and legal writer
- Edward Sullivan Murphy (1880–1945), MP for Attorney General for Northern Ireland (1937–1939) and City of Londonderry (1929–1939)
- Sir Reginald Neville, 1st Baronet (1863–1950), barrister and politician
- Nicholas Padfield (born 1947), English barrister and deputy judge
- Edward Pearce, Baron Pearce (1901–1990), Law Lord
- John Pedder (1784–1859), Chief Justice of Van Diemen's Land (1824–1854)
- Henry Pollock (1864–1953), Acting Attorney General of Hong Kong (1896–1901), Attorney General of Fiji (1901–1903), and Senior Unofficial Member (1917–1941)
- Oliver Popplewell (1927–2024), British judge and cricketer who played 41 first-class matches
- Sir Christopher Rawlinson (1806–1888), Recorder of Prince of Wales Island, Singapore and Malacca, 1847–1850, and Chief Justice of Madras, 1850–1859
- Christopher Robinson (1766–1833), Judge of the High Court of Admiralty (1828–1833) and MP for Callington (1818–1820)
- Sir Henry Russell, 1st Baronet (1751–1836), Chief Justice of Bengal
- L. Gordon Rylands (1862–1942), British criminologist
- Eric Sachs (1898–1979), British barrister and judge
- Terence Skemp (1915–1996), British lawyer and parliamentary draftsman
- Sir Alfred Stephen (1802–1894), Solicitor-General of Van Diemen's Land, 1825–1833, Attorney-General of Van Diemen's Land, 1833–1837, Chief Justice of New South Wales, 1844–1873, and Lieutenant-Governor of New South Wales, 1875–1891
- Thomas Strangman (1873–1971), British barrister who spent much of his career in India
- Samuel Toller (1764–1821), Advocate-General of Madras (1812–1821)
- Jeremy Varcoe (born 1937), ambassador to Somalia and Immigration Tribunal Appeal judge
- George Stovin Venables (1810–1888), barrister and journalist
- Thomas Webster (1810–1875), English barrister known for his involvement in patent legislation and for committee work leading up to the Great Exhibition
- John Walpole Willis (1793–1877), controversial judge in Canada, British Guiana and Australia
- Sir William Yorke, 1st Baronet (c. 1700–1776), judge

== Military ==
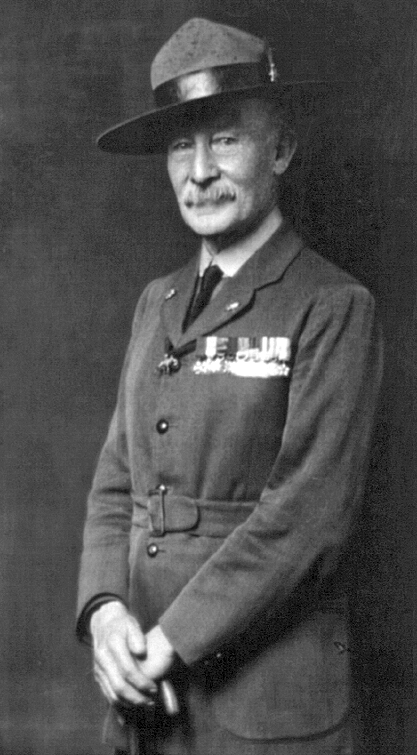
Founder of the Scout Movement Robert Baden-Powell, 1st Baron Baden-Powell

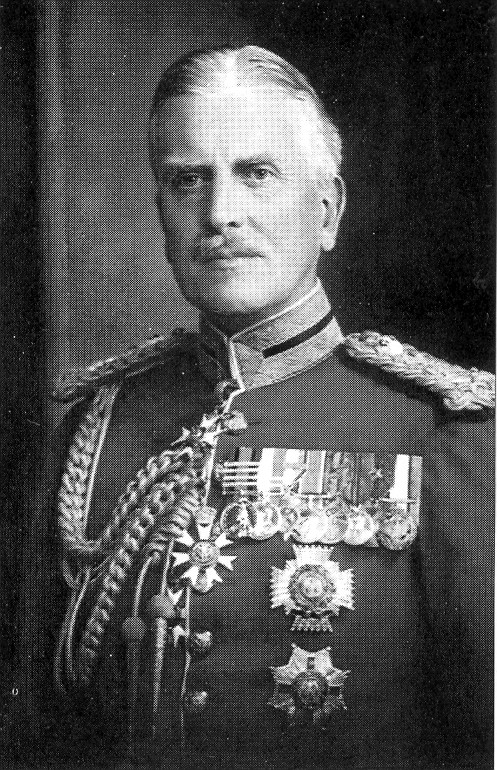
Chief of the Imperial General Staff Field Marshal Sir Archibald Montgomery-Massingberd

- General Sir Frederick Adam (1784–1853), army officer, commander of the 3rd Brigade at the Battle of Waterloo, commander in the Mediterranean, 1817–1824, Lord High Commissioner of the Ionian Islands, 1824–1832, and Governor of Madras, 1832–1837
- Charles Philip de Ainslie (1808–1889), British Army general who was colonel of the 1st The Royal Dragoons (1869–1889)
- General Sir Kenneth Anderson (1891–1959), General Officer Commanding First Army, 1942–1943, GOC Second Army, 1943–1944, GOC Eastern Command, 1944–1945, GOC-in-C East Africa, 1945–1946, and Governor of Gibraltar, 1947–1952
- Lieutenant-General Robert Baden-Powell, 1st Baron Baden-Powell (1857–1941), soldier and founder of the Scouting Movement, commander of Mafeking garrison, 1899–1900, founder and first commander of the South African Constabulary, 1900–1902, Inspector of Cavalry, 1902–1908, General Officer Commanding Northumbrian Division, 1908–1910
- General Henry Bates (1813–1893)
- William Becke (1916–2009), British Army lieutenant-colonel best known for his role during the Indonesia–Malaysia confrontation
- Edward Beddington-Behrens (1897–1968), British Army major and art patron
- Geoffrey Biggs (1938–2002), British Royal Navy vice admiral who was Deputy Commander-in-Chief Fleet (1992–1995)
- Sir David Bill (born 1954), British Army lieutenant-general who was Commandant Royal College of Defence Studies (2012–2014)
- Brigadier Guy Boisragon (1864–1931), Victoria Cross
- Major-General Patrick Brooking (1937–2014), British Army officer and Commandant of the British Sector in Berlin 1985–1989
- Brian Burnett (1913–2011), British RAF Air Chief Marshal who was Air Secretary (1967–1970)
- Thomas Pitt, 2nd Baron Camelford (1775–1804), Royal Navy officer and rake (left after 9 days)
- George Augustus Stewart Cape (1867–1918), British Army brigadier-general
- William Henry Carmichael-Smyth (1780–1861), British Army major
- Hubert Chevis (1902–1931), British Army lieutenant who died of strychnine poisoning after eating contaminated partridge
- Dudley Clarke (1899–1974), leading World War II deception planner and founder of the Commandos
- Colonel James Morris Colquhoun Colvin (1870–1945), Victoria Cross
- Vaughan Cox (1860–1923), British general in the Indian Army
- Richard Craddock (1910–1977), British Army lieutenant-general who was Commander British Forces in Hong Kong (1963–1964) and GOC-in-C Western Command (1964–1966)
- Sir Hugh Cunningham (1921–2019), soldier and Deputy Chief of the Defence Staff, 1976–1978
- Major-General Philip Davies (1932–), GOC North West District (1983–1986)
- John Derry (1921–1952), British RAF Squadron Leader believed to be the first Briton to have exceeded the speed of sound in flight
- Moore Disney (1765–1846), British Army general
- Charles Macpherson Dobell (1869–1954), Canadian lieutenant-general served with the Royal Welch Fusiliers of the British Army
- Lionel Dorling (1860–1925), British Army colonel
- William Assheton Eardley-Wilmot, 3rd Baronet (1841–1896), Deputy Assistant Adjutant General in Ireland
- George Erskine (1899–1965), British Army general and multi-GOC
- Xan Fielding (1918–1991), SOE officer and author
- Sir Francis Fletcher-Vane, 5th Baronet (1861–1934), British military officer
- Brigadier William Fraser (1890–1964), Chief of the United Nations Relief and Rehabilitation Administration
- Air Vice-Marshal Sir Philip Game (1876–1961), Director of Training and Organisation, Royal Air Force, 1919–1923, Air Officer Commanding India, 1923, Air Member for Personnel, 1923–1929, Governor of New South Wales, 1930–1935, and Commissioner of Police of the Metropolis, 1935–1945
- General Sir Timothy Granville-Chapman (born 1947), Adjutant-General to the Forces, 2000–2003, Commander-in-Chief Land, 2003–2005, and Vice-Chief of the Defence Staff, 2005–2009
- Hugh Griffiths, Baron Griffiths (1923–2015), soldier, cricketer, barrister, judge and life peer
- Alan Hartley (1882–1954), British Indian Army general
- Major-General Sir Henry Havelock (1795–1857), commander in the Indian Mutiny
- William Havelock (1793–1848), British Army lieutenant-colonel
- Assistant Commissary-General Sir George Head (1782–1855), army commissary, Deputy Knight-Marshal to William IV and Queen Victoria, 1831–1855
- Lieutenant Richard Hill (1899–1918), British World War I flying ace credited with seven aerial victories
- Field Marshal Sir Richard Hull (1907–1989), Commander, Blade Force, 1942, General Officer Commanding 1st Armoured Division, 1944–1945, GOC 5th Infantry Division, 1945–1946, Commandant, Staff College, Camberley, 1946–1948, Director of Staff Duties, 1948–1950, Chief Army Instructor, Imperial Defence College, 1950–1952, Chief of Staff, Middle East Land Forces, 1953–1954, GOC British Troops in Egypt, 1954–1956, Deputy Chief of the Imperial General Staff, 1956–1958, Commander-in-Chief, Far East Land Forces, 1958–1961, Chief of the Imperial General Staff, 1961–1965, and Chief of the Defence Staff, 1965–1967
- John Hulton (1882–1942), British Army officer
- Thomas Humphreys (1878–1955), GOC 5th Division (1931–1934)
- James Bruce Jardine (1870–1955), British Army brigadier-general
- Cecil Frederick King (1899–1919), British RAF captain who was a World War I fighter ace
- Stanley Kirby (1895–1968), British Army major-general
- George Lea (1912–1990), Head of the British Defence Staff – US (1967–1970)
- Lieutenant-Colonel Gerard Leachman (1880–1920), intelligence officer and traveller
- Richard Lee (1917–1940), flying ace with the Royal Air Force during the Second World War
- Rodney Lees (born 1944), Defence Services Secretary (1998–2001)
- Charles Longcroft (1883–1958), British RAF Air Vice-Marshal and GOC
- Alastair Mackie (1922–2018), Royal Air Force officer and nuclear disarmament campaigner
- Henry Maitland-Makgill-Crichton (1880–1953), British Army brigadier
- Eric Archibald McNair (1894–1918), First World War Victoria Cross
- Field Marshal Sir Archibald Montgomery-Massingberd (1871–1947), Chief of Staff, Fourth Army, 1916–1918, Chief of Staff, British Army of the Rhine, 1918–1920, Deputy Chief of Staff to the Commander-in-Chief, India, 1920–1925, General Officer Commanding Southern Command, Adjutant-General to the Forces, 1931–1933, and Chief of the Imperial General Staff, 1933–1936
- Thomas Morland (1865–1925), British Army brigadier
- W. Stanley Moss (1921–1965), SOE officer, author and traveller
- Robert Francis Brydges Naylor (1889–1971), British Army general who was Vice Quartermaster-General (1943–1944)
- Oliver Newmarch (1934–1920), general who was Military Secretary to the India Office (1889–1899)
- Lieutenant-General Edward F. Norton (1884–1954), soldier and mountaineer, Acting Governor of Hong Kong, 1940–1941, and General Officer Commanding Western Independent District, India, 1941–1942
- Thomas Pearson (1914–2019), Commander-in-Chief of Allied Forces Northern Europe (1972–1974)
- Arthur Potter (1905–1998), British Indian Army brigadier
- John Murray Prain (1902–2001), soldier and Scottish businessman
- Harry Pritchard (1871–1953), GOC Malaya Command (1929–1931)
- Neville Purvis (born 1936), Chief of Fleet Support (1991–1994)
- Alexander Rabagliati (1914–1943), Scottish fighter pilot
- William Robert McClintock-Bunbury, 4th Baron Rathdonnell MC (1914–1959) soldier and Irish peer
- Thomas Leopold McClintock-Bunbury, 3rd Baron Rathdonnell (1881–1937), soldier and peer
- Edward Ravenshaw (1854–1880), Scottish footballer
- Colin Rawlins (1919–2003), British civil servant and RAF officer
- General Brian Robertson, 1st Baron Robertson of Oakridge (1896–1974), managing director, Dunlop, South Africa, 1935–1940, Chief Administrative Officer, Allied Forces in Italy, 1944–1945, Deputy Military Governor of the British Zone of Germany, 1945–1947, Commander-in-Chief, British Army of the Rhine, 1947–1949, British Commissioner, Allied High Commission, 1949–1950, C-in-C Middle East Land Forces, 1950–1953, and Chairman of the British Transport Commission, 1953–1961
- Philip Robertson (1866–1936), GOC 17th (Northern) Division (1916–1919) and 52nd (Lowland) Infantry Division (1919–1923)
- William Victor Trevor Rooper (1897–1917), British World War I captain and flying ace
- Richmond Shakespear (1812–1861), British Indian Army lieutenant-colonel who helped to influence the Khan of Khiva to abolish slavery in Khiva.
- Freddie Sowrey (1922–2019), British Air Marshal who was Commandant of the National Defence College (1972–1975)
- John Squire (1780–1812), Lieutenant-Colonel in the Royal Engineers
- Frank Noel Stagg (1884–1956), British Royal Navy commander known for his role in Danish and Norwegian resistance movements
- James Swaby (1798–1863), one of the first non-white commissioned officers in the British Army
- Brigadier John Tiltman (1894–1982), cryptographer, Chief Cryptographer, Bletchley Park
- Frank Weare (1896–1971), British RAF Flight Lieutenant who was a flying ace in World War I
- Ronald Weeks, 1st Baron Weeks (1890–1960), Deputy Chief of the Imperial General Staff
- Christopher Welby-Everard (1909–1996), GOC Nigerian Army (1963–1965)
- Major-General Orde Wingate (1903–1944), guerrilla warfare specialist, founder and commander of the Chindits
- F. W. Winterbotham (1897–1990), intelligence officer

== Religion and theologians ==
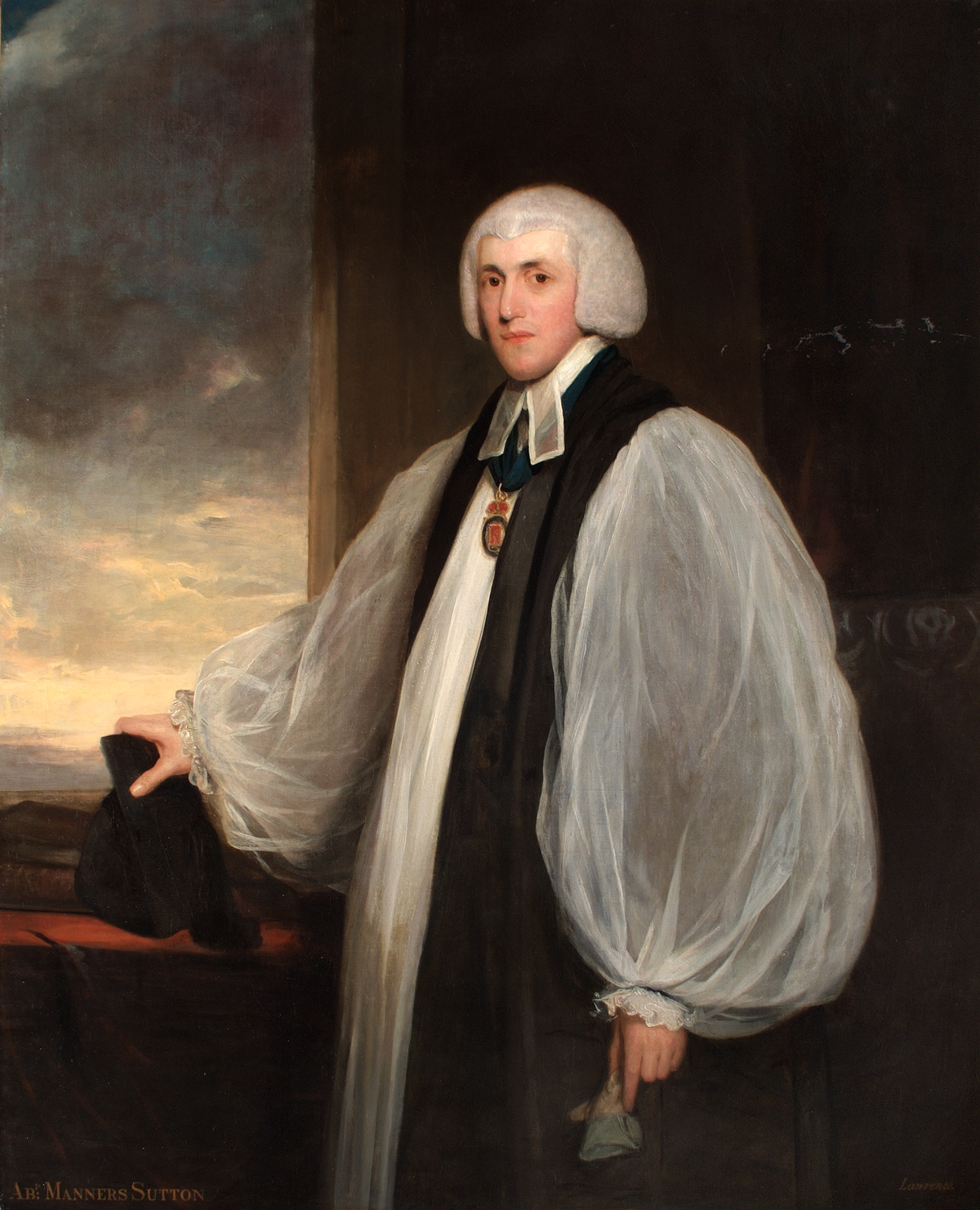
Archbishop of Canterbury from 1805 to 1828 Charles Manners-Sutton

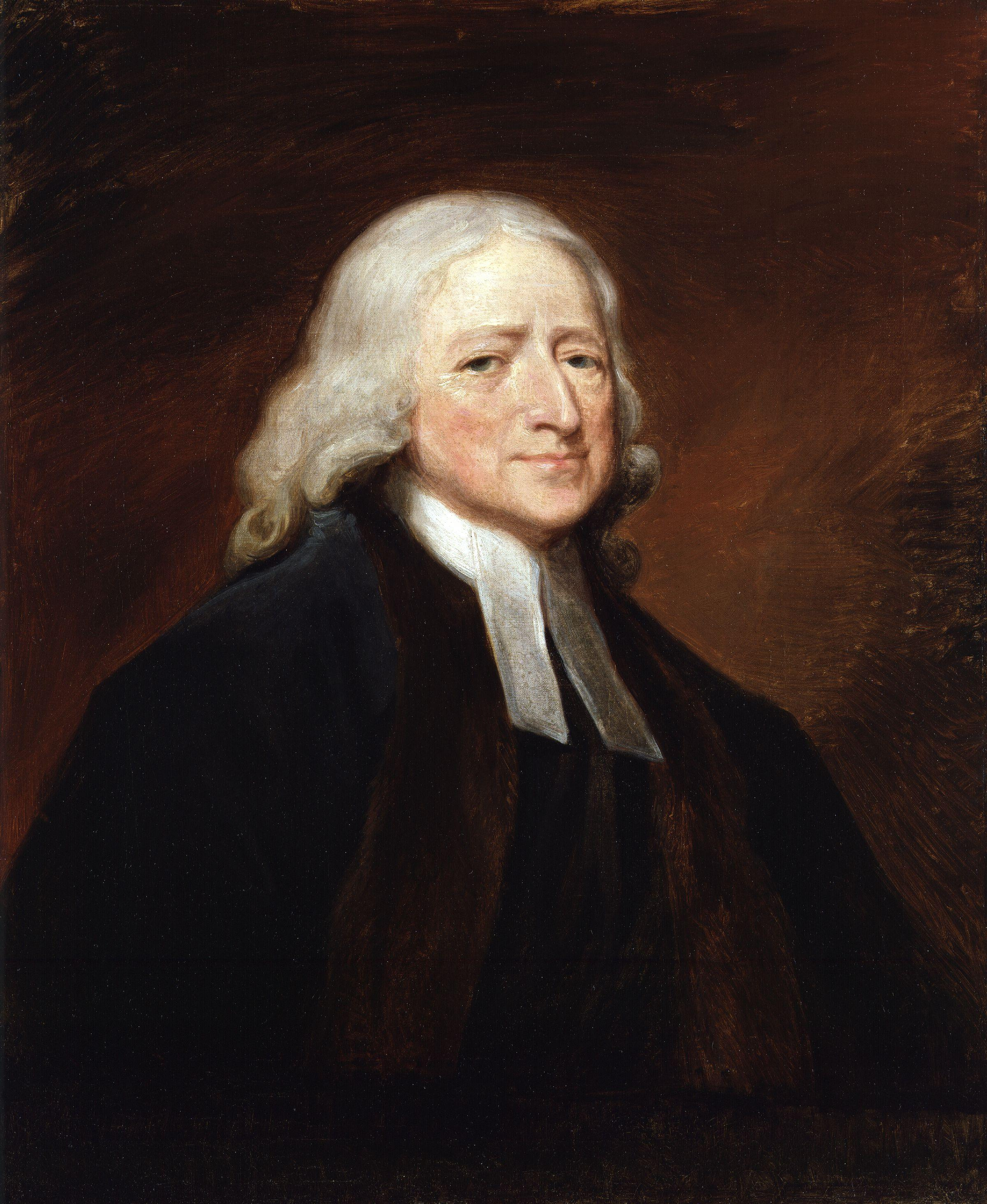
Founder of Methodism John Wesley

- Thomas Gilbank Ackland (1791–1844), English clergyman
- Gilbert Ainslie (1793–1870), clergyman, Master of Pembroke College, Cambridge, and Vice-Chancellor of the University of Cambridge
- James Allen (1802–1897), Dean of St David's (1879–1895)
- Arthur Anstey (1873–1955), Archbishop of the West Indies (1943–1945)
- John Armstrong (1813–1856), Bishop of Grahamstown, 1853–1856
- William Alexander Ayton (1816–1909), clergyman, alchemist, and member of the Hermetic Order of the Golden Dawn
- Frederick Beadon (1777–1879), English clergyman who lived to 101
- Philip Bearcroft (1695–1761), English clergyman and antiquary
- Martin Benson (1689–1752), Bishop of Gloucester
- John Ernest Bode (1816–1874), clergyman and poet
- Henry Bonney (1780–1862), English churchman and author
- Peter Bostock (1911–1999), Archdeacon of Mombasa and Doncaster
- Henry Bowlby (1823–1894), Bishop of Coventry (1891–1894)
- George Boyle (1828–1901), Dean of Salisbury (1880–1901)
- Samuel Bradford (1652–1731), Bishop of Carlisle and Rochester
- John Buckner (1734–1824), Bishop of Chichester
- Andrew Burn (1864–1927), Dean of Salisbury
- Hedley Burrows (1887–1983), Dean of Hereford
- Leonard Burrows (1857–1940), Bishop of Lewes and Sheffield
- Eyton Butts (–1779), Dean of Cloyne (1770–1779)
- Sir Anthony Buzzard, 3rd Baronet (born 1935), biblical scholar and Christian theologian
- Donald Campbell (1886–1933), Archdeacon of Carlisle (1930–1933)
- Edward Churton (1800–1874), Archdeacon of Cleveland (1846–1874) and Spanish scholar
- Arthur Clarke (1848–1932), Archdeacon of Lancaster and Rochdale
- Sir William Cockburn, 11th Baronet (1773–1858), Dean of York (1823–1858)
- James Cropper (1862–1938), Dean of Gibraltar
- Christopher Cunliffe (born 1955), Archdeacon of Derby
- William Davey (1825–1917), Dean of Llandaff (1897–1913)
- Richard Eyre (1929–2012), Dean of Exeter
- Henry Felton (1679–1740), English clergyman
- John Finney (born 1932), churchman and former Bishop of Pontefract
- John Fisher (1788–1832), Archdeacon of Berkshire
- Henry FitzHerbert (1882–1958), Archdeacon of Derby
- Henry Formby (1816–1884), English Roman Catholic priest and writer
- Walter Frere (1863–1938), founder member of the Community of the Resurrection, Bishop of Truro, 1923–1935
- Alfred Gatty (1813–1903), clergyman and writer
- Edgar Gibson (1848–1924), Bishop of Gloucester
- Charles Green (1864–1944), Archdeacon of Monmouth, 1914–1921, first Bishop of Monmouth, 1921–1928, Bishop of Bangor, 1928–1944, and Archbishop of Wales, 1934–1944
- Charles Hahn (1870–1930), Archdeacon of Eshowe (1913–?) and Archdeacon of Damaraland (1924–1927)
- William Hale (1795–1870), Archdeacon of St Albans (1839–1840), Archdeacon of Middlesex (1840–1842), Archdeacon of London (1842–1870)
- Julius Hare (1795–1855), theological writer
- Peter Harrison (born 1939), Archdeacon of the East Riding (1999–2006)
- William Hayter (1858–1935), Dean of Gibraltar
- Joseph Henshaw (1603–1679), Bishop of Peterborough, 1663–1679
- Mark Hiddesley (1698–1772), Bishop of Sodor and Man, 1755–1772
- Air Marshal Sir John Frederick Andrews Higgins (1875–1948), founder member of the Royal Flying Corps, Commander, No.2 Brigade, RFC, 1916–1918, Royal Air Force commander, British Army of the Rhine, Air Officer Commanding Northern Area, Director of Personnel, AOC Inland Area, 1922–1924, AOC Iraq, 1924–?, Air Member for Supply and Research, and AOC-in-C India, 1939–1940
- Samuel Hinds (1793–1872), Bishop of Norwich, 1849–1857
- William Hornby (1810–1899), Archdeacon of Lancaster
- William Hurrell (1860–1952), Archdeacon of Loughborough
- Murray Irvine (1924–2005), churchman and Provost of Southwell Minster
- Henry Jacobs (1824–1901), Dean of Christchurch (1866–1901)
- Thomas James (1786–1828), Bishop of Calcutta, 1826–1828, and art historian
- William Jones of Nayland (1726–1800), controversial clergyman
- John Jortin (1698–1770), ecclesiastical historian and literary critic
- Peter Judd (1949–), Dean of Chelmsford (1997–2013)
- William Smyth King (1810–1890), Dean of Leighlin
- Hubert Larken (1874–1964), Archdeacon of Lincoln (1933–1937)
- George Henry Law (1761–1845), Bishop of Chester, 1812–1824, and Bishop of Bath and Wells, 1824–1845
- John Law (1745–1810), bishop
- Henry Majendie (1764–1830), Bishop of Chester and Bangor
- Charles Manners-Sutton (1755–1828), Bishop of Norwich, 1792–1805, and Archbishop of Canterbury, 1805–1828
- James Henry Monk (1784–1856), theologian and classicist, Bishop of Gloucester, 1830–1836, and Bishop of Gloucester and Bristol, 1836–1856
- Thomas Mozley (1806–1893), clergyman and writer
- Arthur Munro (1864–1944), Rector of Lincoln College, Oxford
- William Foxley Norris (1859–1949), Dean of York and Westminster
- Ronald O'Ferrall (1890–1973), Bishop of Madagascar (1926–1940)
- William Bruère Otter (1805–1876), Archdeacon of Lewes
- Oswald Parry (1868–1936), Bishop of Guyana
- Lancelot Phelps (1853–1936), Provost of Oriel College, Oxford (1914–1930)
- Greville Phillimore (1821–1884), clergyman and author
- William Phillpotts (1807–1888), Archdeacon of Cornwall
- Venn Pilcher (1879–1961), Bishop of Sydney (1935–1961)
- Bertram Pollock (1863–1943), Bishop of Norwich
- Kenrick Prescot (1703–1779), Vice-Chancellor of the University of Cambridge (1744–1745)
- Arthur Preston (1883–1936), Bishop of Woolwich
- John Pretyman (?–1817), Archdeacon of Lincoln (1793–1817)
- William Forbes Raymond (1785–1860), Archdeacon of Northumberland
- John Ryder (c. 1697–1775), Church of Ireland Bishop of Down and Connor, 1743–1752, and Archbishop of Tuam, 1752–1775
- Leonard Savill (1869–1959), Archdeacon of Tonbridge (1942–1968)
- Alexander John Scott (1768–1840), English clergyman who was Horatio Nelson's personal chaplain at the Battle of Trafalgar
- Charles Scott (1847–1927), Bishop of North China (1880–1913)
- Albert Seymour (1841–1908), Archdeacon of Barnstaple
- Godfrey Smith (1878–1944), Bishop of Penrith (1926–1944)
- Pat Smythe (1860–1935), Provost of St Ninian's Cathedral (1911–1935)
- Henry Southwell (1860–1937), Bishop of Lewes
- Samuel John Stone (1839–1900), clergyman and hymn writer
- William Strong (1756–1842), Archdeacon of Northampton (1797–1842)
- Edward Talbot (1844–1934), first Warden of Keble College, Oxford, 1869–1888, Vicar of Leeds, 1889–1895, Bishop of Rochester, 1895–1905, first Bishop of Southwark, 1905–1911, and Bishop of Winchester, 1911–1923
- Connop Thirlwall (1797–1875), Bishop of St Davids, 1840–1874, and historian
- John Thomas (1696–1781), Bishop of Winchester
- William Unwin (1745–1786), clergyman
- Peter Vaughan (born 1930–2020), churchman and former Bishop of Ramsbury
- Wilmot Vyvyan (1861–1937), Bishop of Zululand (1903–1929)
- Thomas Wagstaffe (1645–1712), English clergyman
- Hampton Weekes (1880–1948), Archdeacon of the Isle of Wight
- John Wesley (1703–1791), founder of Methodism
- Samuel Wix (1771–1861), English cleric and controversialist
- George Wollaston (1738–1826), English Anglican priest
- Michael Whinney (1930–2017), churchman and former Bishop of Aston and Bishop of Southwell
- George Whitaker (1811–1882), clergyman and first provost of Trinity College, Toronto
- Herbert Wild (1865–1940), Bishop of Newcastle (1915–1927)
- Thomas Wilson (1882–1961), Archdeacon of Worcester
- John Wollaston (1791–1856), Archdeacon of Western Australia
- John Woodhouse (1884–1955), Bishop of Thetford

== Writers, novelists, and poets ==
- Joseph Addison (1672–1719), writer and politician
- Martin Donisthorpe Armstrong (1882–1974), poet and novelist
- Mordaunt Roger Barnard (1828–1906), translator and author
- F. W. Bateson (1901–1978), English literary scholar and critic
- Thomas Lovell Beddoes (1803–1849), English poet and dramatist
- Max Beerbohm (1872–1956), satirist and caricaturist
- James Beresford (1764–1840), novelist
- James Shergold Boone (1799–1859), English cleric and writer
- T. E. B. Clarke (1907–1989), author and screenwriter
- Alexander Clifford (1909–1952), journalist and author
- Richard Crashaw (1612 or 1613–1648), poet
- Arthur Shearly Cripps (1869–1952), English Anglican priest who lived in Southern Rhodesia
- Patrick Cullinan (1932–2011), South African poet and biographer
- Lewis Dartnell (born 1980), science writer
- Thomas Day (1748–1789), author
- George Harcourt Vanden-Bampde-Johnstone, 3rd Baron Derwent (1899–1949), English poet and peer
- John Dighton (1909–1989), British playwright and screenwriter
- Brian Glanville (1931–2025), football writer and novelist
- Richard Perceval Graves (born 1945), English biographer on his great-uncle Robert Graves
- Robert Graves (1895–1985), poet and novelist
- Peter Heyworth (1921–1991), American-born English music critic and biographer
- Aubrey Hopwood (1863–1917), lyricist and novelist
- Richard Hughes (1900–1976), novelist and dramatist
- James Innes (born 1975), author
- Christopher Jackson (born 1980), author and poet
- Peter James (born 1948), crime writer
- John Kenyon (1784–1856), English verse-writer and philanthropist best now known as a patron of Robert Browning
- Nathaniel Lee (c. 1647–1692), dramatist and poet
- Arthur Locker (1828–1893), English novelist and journalist
- Richard Lovelace (1618–1657), poet and soldier
- Henry Luttrell (1768–1851), wit and poet
- Andrew Lycett, English biographer and journalist
- Lachlan Mackinnon (born 1956), poet and critic
- G. D. Martineau (1897–1976), English cricket writer
- Gavin Menzies (1937–2020), author
- Kenneth Newton (1927–2010), novelist
- Francis Turner Palgrave (1824–1897), critic and poet
- Robert Paltock (1697–1767), writer
- Omar Pound (1926–2010), Anglo-American writer, teacher, and translator
- Jim Powell (1949–2023), novelist
- Henry Raper (1799–1859), writer on navigation
- Frederic Raphael (born 1931), writer
- Simon Raven (1927–2001), writer
- Édouard Roditi (1910–1992), American poet, short-story writer and translator
- William Seward (1747–1799), anecdotist and conversationalist
- Sir Richard Steele (c. 1672–1729), writer and politician, founder of The Tatler
- G. S. Street (1867–1936), critic, journalist and novelist
- A. S. J. Tessimond (1902–1962), poet
- William Makepeace Thackeray (1811–1863), novelist
- Edward Hovell-Thurlow, 2nd Baron Thurlow (1781–1829), poet
- Ben Travers (1886–1980), dramatist
- Martin Farquhar Tupper (1810–1889), poet and writer
- Richard Usborne (1910–2006), British journalist and author regarded as the leading scholar of P. G. Wodehouse
- William Edward Vickers (1889–1965), English mystery writer
- Hilary Wayment (1912–2005), author and historian of stained glass

== Actors ==
- George Asprey (born 1966), actor
- Sir Johnston Forbes-Robertson (1853–1937), actor-manager
- Richard Goolden (1895–1981), British actor (Toad of Toad Hall, The Hitchhiker's Guide to the Galaxy, et al.)
- Basil Hallam (1889–1916), English actor and singer best known for the character of Gilbert the Filbert in The Passing Show
- Nicky Henson (1945–2019), actor
- Oli Higginson (born 1994), actor, writer, and musician
- Thomas Hull (1728–1808), English actor and dramatist
- Frederick Kerr (1858–1933), English actor
- Cyril Maude (1862–1951), actor-manager
- Sir Ronald Millar (1919–1998), actor, scriptwriter and speechwriter for Margaret Thatcher
- Richard Murdoch (1907–1990), actor and comedian
- Dennis Neilson-Terry (1895–1932), British actor and producer
- Graham Seed (born 1950), actor who played Nigel Pargetter in BBC radio programme The Archers
- Henry Siddons (1774–1815), English actor and theatrical manager now remembered as a writer on gesture
- Hugh Sinclair (1903–1962), British actor
- Sir C. Aubrey Smith (1863–1948), actor and cricketer
- Geoffrey Toone (1910–2005), actor
- Frederick Henry Yates (1797–1842), actor-manager
- Sam Crane (born 1979), actor

== Journalists and presenters ==
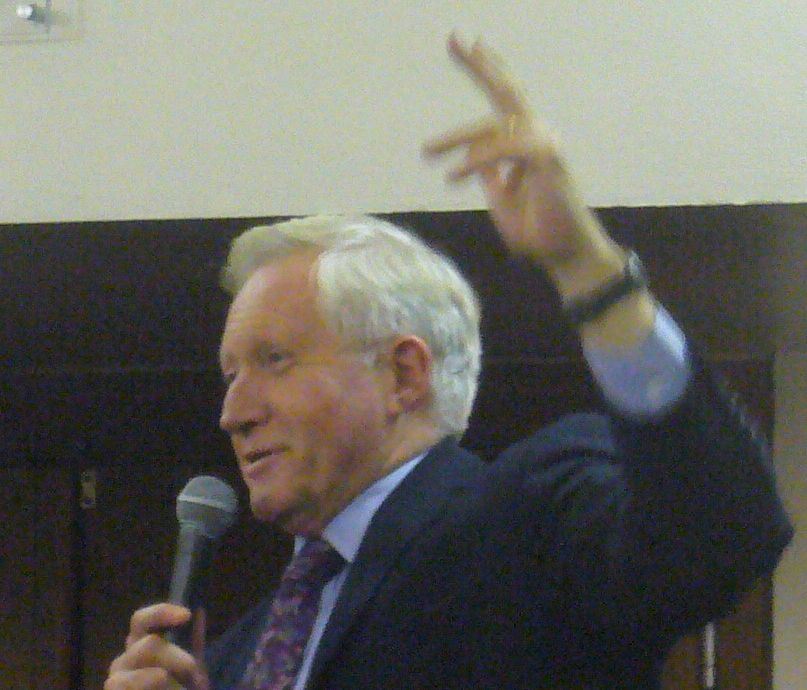
Television presenter David Dimbleby

Television presenter Jonathan Dimbleby

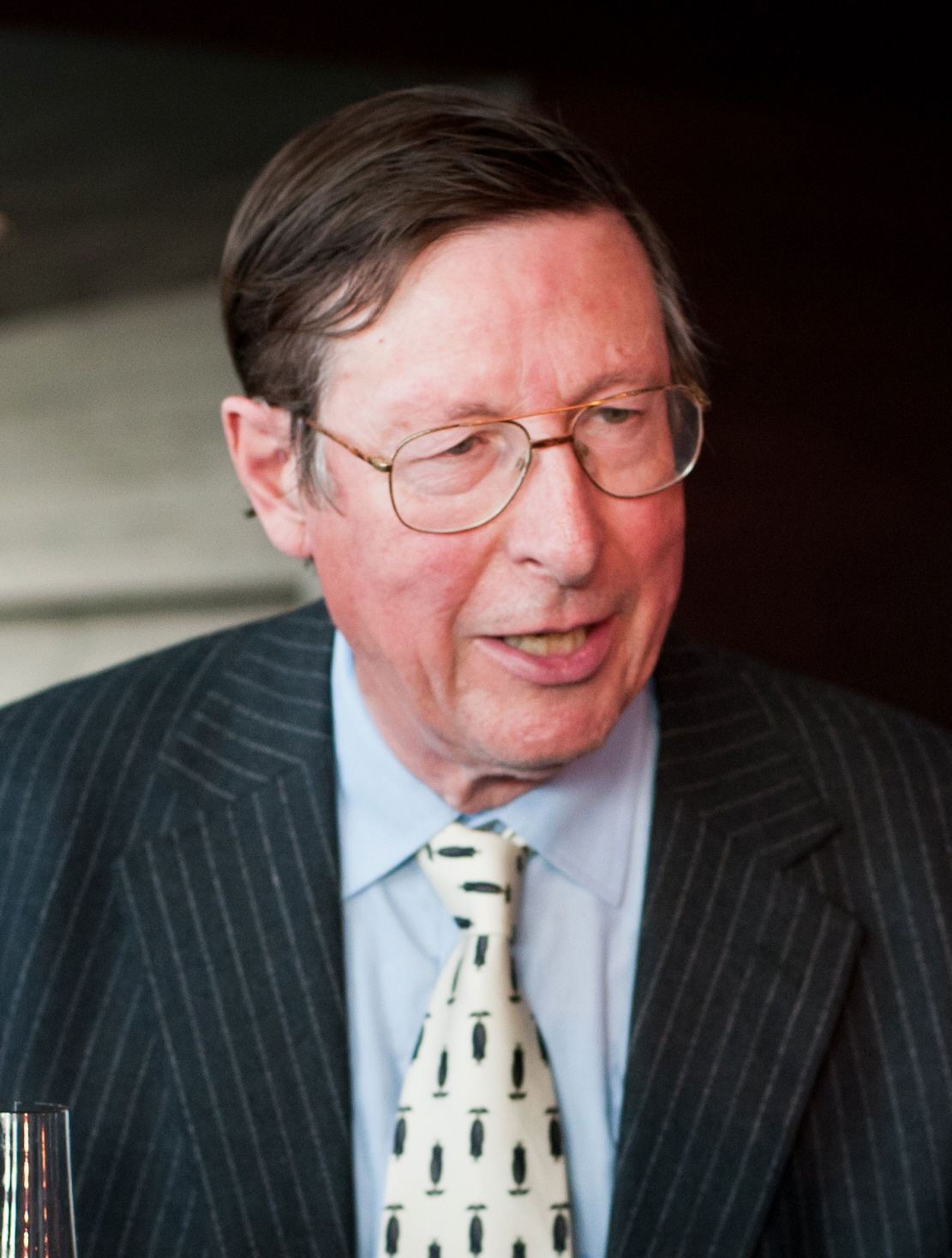
Journalist and author Sir Max Hastings

- Richard Dennen (born 1982), journalist and editor of Tatler
- David Dimbleby (born 1938), television presenter
- Jonathan Dimbleby (born 1944), television and radio presenter
- William Godwin the Younger (1803–1832), English journalist and author
- Sir Max Hastings (born 1945), journalist, writer and broadcaster
- Jonathan Holborow (born 1943), British newspaper editor
- Philip Hope-Wallace (1911–1979), English music and theatre critic associated with ‘’The Manchester Guardian’’
- Tim Judah (born 1962), journalist and author
- Henry Longhurst (1909–1978), golf journalist and commentator
- Michael Melford (1916–1999), British sports journalist
- Basil Murray (1902–1937), British journalist and editor
- Cathy Newman (born 1974), journalist and Channel 4 presenter
- Benedict Nightingale (born 1939), British journalist
- Peter O'Sullevan (1918–2015), Irish-British horse racing commentator
- John Peet (born 1954), journalist for The Economist
- Gerald Priestland (1927–1991), broadcaster and writer
- Adam Raphael (born 1938), journalist
- William Rees-Mogg, Baron Rees-Mogg (1928–2012), public servant, journalist, and editor of The Times (1967–81)
- Olly Smith (born 1974), wine writer and television presenter
- Charles Spencer (1955–), British journalist
- David Walter (1948–2012), ITN and BBC correspondent, radio and television producer and later political advisor (President of the Oxford Union and winner of the Kennedy Memorial Scholarship to the Massachusetts Institute of Technology)
- Kent Walton (1917–2003), wrestling commentator

== Media producers and directors ==
- Colin Blumenau (born 1956), theatre director
- Sir Anthony Havelock-Allan (1904–2003), film producer
- John Mollo (1931–2017), costume designer for the film industry
- Farhad Safinia (born 1975), film producer
- Jack Whittingham (1910–1972), James Bond screenwriter
- Peter Yates (1929–2011), film director

== Artists ==
- Adrian Berg (1929–2011), painter
- Anthony Caro (1924–2013), sculptor
- John Cobbett (1929–), Scottish-born sculptor
- Adrian Daintrey (1902–1988), British portrait and landscape painter
- Charles Lock Eastlake (1793–1865), painter and first Director of the National Gallery, 1855–1865
- Claud Lovat Fraser (1890–1921), artist and designer
- Anthony Froshaug (1920–1984), English typographer and designer
- Geoffrey Sneyd Garnier (1889–1970), English artist and printmaker
- John Percival Gülich (1864–1898), illustrator, engraver and artist
- David Hicks (1929–1998), interior designer and author
- Johnny Jonas (born 1948), painter
- Sir Osbert Lancaster (1908–1961), cartoonist and designer
- John Leech (1817–1864), caricaturist
- John Lewis (1912–1996), typographer and illustrator
- Sir Cedric Morris (1889–1982), painter and gardener
- Charles William Dyson Perrins (1864–1958), art, porcelain and book collector and benefactor
- Percy Robertson (1868–1934), English watercolour landscape painter and etcher
- John Tunnard (1900–1971), painter

== Architects ==
- Alfred Bossom, Baron Bossom (1881–1965), architect and politician
- Richard Carpenter (1841–1893), English Gothic Revival architect
- Richard Cromwell Carpenter (1812–1855), architect
- Basil Champneys (1842–1935), architect and author
- Francis William Deas (1862–1951), Scottish architect
- Major Rohde Hawkins (1821–1884), English architect of the Victorian era
- Owen Jones (1809–1874), architect, printer and designer
- Russell Page (1906–1985), British gardener and architect
- Richard Gilbert Scott (1923–2017), British architect
- Sir Eustace Tennyson d'Eyncourt (1868–1951), naval architect, Director of Naval Construction, 1912–1924
- Richard Tyler (1916–2009), architect
- Thomas Bostock Whinney (1860–1926), chief architect of the Midland Bank

== Musicians and composers ==
- Ben Adams (born 1981), singer and member of a1
- Tom Allom (born TBC), record producer and engineer. Most notably Judas Priest
- Tony Banks (born 1950), keyboardist and founding member of Genesis
- Mark Blatchly (born 1960), composer and organist at Charterhouse
- Ray Cooper (born 1954), English singer-songwriter and member of Oysterband
- Harold Fraser-Simson (1872–1944), composer
- Peter Gabriel (born 1950), singer-songwriter and founding member of Genesis
- H. Balfour Gardiner (1877–1950), composer
- Christopher Gibbons (c. 1615–1676), organist and composer
- John R. Graham, American film composer
- Peter Grant (1935–1995), manager of Led Zeppelin
- Basil Harwood (1859–1949), organist and composer
- Ernest Irving (1877–1953), musical director and composer
- Rivers Jobe (1950–1979), bass guitarist and member of Anon
- Jonathan King (born 1944), singer, writer, pop music, TV personality, film maker. Named and produced Genesis
- Dave Lawson (born 1945), English keyboardist and composer, member of Greenslade
- Richard Macphail (1950–2024), vocalist for Anon
- Lionel Monckton (1861–1924), composer and songwriter
- Peter Oundjian (born 1955), Canadian violinist and conductor
- Anthony Phillips (born 1951), guitarist and founding member of Genesis
- Rachel Portman (born 1960), composer
- Clement Power (born 1980), conductor
- Philip Radcliffe (1905–1986), composer and musicologist
- Christopher Raeburn (1928–2009), English record producer
- Alfred Edward Rodewald (1862–1903), English musician who developed the Liverpool Orchestral Society to become a large semi-professional orchestra of distinction
- Lettice Rowbotham (b. 1989), violinist, finalist in the 2014 season of Britain's Got Talent
- Mike Rutherford (born 1950), guitarist and founding member of Genesis and Mike + The Mechanics
- Chris Stewart (born 1951), founding member of Genesis
- Ian Wallace (1919–2009), singer and broadcaster
- Karl Wallinger (1957–2024), rock musician
- Ralph Vaughan Williams (1872–1958), composer

== Sportspeople ==
=== Cricketers ===
- Brigadier-General Anthony Abdy (1856–1924), English cricketer who played one first-class match in 1881
- Anthony Allom (1938–2017), English cricketer who played five first-class matches
- Richard Bagge (1810–1891), English cricketer who played two first-class matches
- Andrew Barker (born 1945), English cricketer who played 6 List A and 44 first-class matches
- Francis Barmby (1863–1936), English cricketer who played one first-class match
- Aubrey Beauclerk (1817–1853), English cricketer who played in two first-class matches in 1837
- Charles William Beauclerk (1816–1863), English cricketer who played ? first-class matches
- Cecil Bodington, English cricketer who played 10 first-class matches
- James Bovill (born 1971), English cricketer who played 26 List A and 38 first-class matches
- Robert Braddell (1888–1965), English cricketer who played 20 first-class matches
- Trevor Branston (1884–1969), English cricketer who played 89 first-class matches
- William Bristowe (born 1963), English cricketer who played 1 List A and 10 first-class matches
- James Bruce-Jones (1910–1943), Scottish cricketer who played 2 first-class matches
- John Buchanan (1887–1969), South African-born English cricketer who played 34 first-class matches
- Herbert Burrell (1866–1949), English cricketer who played three first-class matches
- Tom Bury (born 1958), English cricketer who played 4 first-class matches
- Arthur Ceely (1834–1866), English cricketer who played 3 first-class matches
- William Chetwynd-Talbot (1814–1888), English cricketer who played one first-class match
- Edward Colebrooke (1858–1939), cricketer
- Geoffrey Cooke (1897–1980), cricketer and British Army officer
- Alexander Cowie (1889–1916), English cricketer who played 14 first-class matches
- Wilfred Curwen (1883–1915), English cricketer who played 25 first-class matches
- Alfred Dallas (1895–1921), English cricketer who played in one first-class match
- William Davies (1825–1868), English cricketer who played 9 first-class matches
- Gilbert Sackville, 8th Earl De La Warr (1869–1915), hereditary peer and cricketer
- Christian Doll (1880–1955), cricketer and architect
- Mordaunt Doll (1888–1966), cricketer
- John Dyson (1913–1991), first-class cricketer
- Frederick Fane (1875–1960), Anglo-Irish cricketer who played 14 Test and 417 first-class matches
- Leonard Furber (1880–1912), English cricketer who played 2 first-class matches
- Tommy Garnett (1915–2006), Australian horticulturalist and English cricketer who played five first-class matches
- Edward Garrow (1815–1896), English cricketer who played one first-class match
- Humphrey Gilbert (1886–1960), Indian-born English cricketer who played in 118 first-class matches
- Ivor Gilliat (1903–1967), English cricketer who played 13 first-class matches
- Richard Gilliat (born 1944), English cricketer who played 269 first-class matches
- Guy Goodliffe (1883–1963), English cricketer who played one first-class match
- George Gowan (1818–1890), cricketer
- Herbert Green (1878–1918), English cricketer and soldier who played in one first-class match
- Guy Gregson-Ellis (1895–1969), English cricketer who played four first-class matches
- Lancelot Grove (1905–1943), English cricketer who played four first-class matches
- James Hamblin (born 1978), English cricketer who played 11 first-class matches, 48 List A matches and 5 Twenty20 matches
- Andrew Hamilton (born 1953), English cricketer who played 12 first-class matches
- Charles Harvey (1837–1917), English cricketer who played five first-class matches
- Charles Hooman (1887–1969), English cricketer who played 38 first-class matches
- Harry Hooper (born 1986), English cricketer who played 7 first-class matches
- Mike Hooper (1947–2010), English cricketer who played 17 List A and 21 first-class matches
- Campbell Hulton (1877–1947), English cricketer who played one first-class match, brother of the below
- John Hulton (1882–1942), English cricketer who played 3 first-class matches, brother of the above
- Francis Inge (1840–1923), English cricketer and clergyman who played nine first-class matches
- John Inge (1844–1919), English cricketer who played two first-class matches
- Tony Jakobson (born 1937), English cricketer who played 14 first-class matches
- Ben Jeffery (born 1991), English cricketer who played 6 first-class matches
- Antony Kamm (1931–2011), English historian and cricketer
- George Kemp-Welch (1907–1944), English cricketer who played 114 first-class matches
- John Larking (1921–1998), English cricketer who played three first-class matches
- Jeff Linton (1909–1989), Welsh cricketer who played two first-class matches
- Michael Livock (1936–1999), English cricketer who played two first-class matches
- John Lomas (1917–1945), English cricketer who played 23 first-class matches
- Christopher Lubbock (1920–2000), English cricketer who played nine first-class matches
- Herbert Malkin (1836–1913), English cricketer who played two first-class matches in 1858
- Roger Marshall (born 1952), English cricketer who played 12 List A and 24 first-class matches
- Peter May (1929–1994), England cricket captain
- Alfred McGaw (1900–1984), English cricketer who played seven first-class matches
- William Meryweather (1809–1841), English cricketer who played ? first-class matches
- Niel Morgan (1904–1985), Welsh cricketer who played six first-class matches
- Trevil Morgan (1907–1976), Welsh cricketer who played 83 first-class matches
- John Stanton Fleming Morrison (1892–1961), English cricketer who played 38 first-class matches
- Charles Nepean (1851–1903), English cricketer who played ten first-class matches
- Henry Nethercote (1819–1886), English cricketer who played 19 first-class matches
- Oswald Norris (1883–1973), English cricketer who played 11 first-class matches
- Cecil Parry (1866–1901), English cricketer who played ? first-class matches
- Cecil Payne (1885–1976), English cricketer who played 29 first-class matches
- Alec Pearce (1910–1982), cricketer (Kent County Cricket Club, Hong Kong national cricket team, and Marylebone Cricket Club)
- Ernest Powell (1861–1928), English cricketer who played 21 first-class matches
- Jack Pritchard (1895–1936), English cricketer who played 2 first-class matches
- Bernard Randolph (1834–1857), English cricketer who played seven first-class matches
- R. C. Robertson-Glasgow (1901–1965), Scottish cricketer who played 144 first-class matches and wrote several books on cricket
- Gavin Roynon (1936–2018), English cricketer who played nine first-class matches and military historian
- Charles Rucker (1894–1965), English cricketer who played five first-class matches
- Patrick Rucker (1900–1940), English cricketer who played seven first-class matches
- Martin Souter (born 1976), English cricketer who played one first-class match
- Edward Spurway (1863–1914), English cricketer who played two first-class matches
- Hugh Stanbrough (1870–1904), English footballer and cricketer
- John Strachan MC (1896–1988), English cricketer who played one first-class match and British Army officer
- Edward Streatfeild (1870–1932), English cricketer who played nine first-class matches
- Alexander Streatfeild-Moore (1863–1940), English cricketer who played first-class matches
- Gilbert Vassall (1876–1941), English cricketer who played six first-class matches
- Charles Vintcent (1866–1943), South African cricketer who played in 3 Test and 6 first-class matches
- William Wakefield (1870–1922), cricketer
- Algernon Whiting (1861–1931), English cricketer who played nine first-class matches
- Reginald Wood (1860–1915), English cricketer who played one Test and 12 first-class matches
- Anthony Wreford-Brown (1912–1997), English cricketer who played five first-class matches
- Charles Wreford-Brown (1866–1951), English international football captain and cricketer
- Charles Wright (1863–1936), English cricketer who played seven first-class matches
- Teddy Wynyard (1861–1936), English cricketer who played 3 Test and 154 first-class matches

=== Other sports ===
- Andrew Amos (1863–1931), England international footballer and clergyman
- Woolf Barnato (1895–1948), British racing driver among the Bentley Boys
- Alfred Bower (1895–1970), England footballer
- Oswald Carver (1887–1915), British Olympic rower who won bronze in the 1908 men's eight
- William "Nuts" Cobbold (1862–1922), England international footballer
- James Ogilvie Fairlie (1809–1870), Scottish golfer
- Walter Gilliat (1869–1963), England international footballer and clergyman
- Richard Clewin Griffith (1872–1955), British chess champion (1912) and chess author
- Alan Haig-Brown (1877–1918), English footballer and British Army officer who served as commander of the Lancing Officers' Training Corps
- Wyndham Halswelle (1882–1915), sprinter who won Olympic gold in 1908 in the 400m and was killed in battle during World War One. The school refused an offer to host his Olympic medals and other trophies in 2008. They are now displayed in the Scottish Sports Hall of Fame.
- Thomas Hooman (1850–1938), English footballer
- John Frederic Inglis (1853–1923), Scottish cricketer and footballer
- Stewart Morris (1909–1991), British Olympic sailor who won gold in the 1948 men's swallow
- Edward Hagarty Parry (1855–1931), English footballer
- Basil Patchitt (1900–1991), English footballer
- Vane Pennell (1876–1938), English Olympic rackets player who won gold in the 1908 men's doubles
- James F. M. Prinsep (1861–1895), footballer and holder of two 'youngest player' records until 2004
- Tom Rowlandson MC (1880–1916), England amateur football goalkeeper
- G. O. Smith (1872–1943), English amateur footballer often referred to as "the first great centre forward"
- Ulric Oliver Thynne (1871–1957), British colonel and champion polo player
- Courtenay Lee Verelst (1855–1890), England rugby international and Liverpool forward
- Arthur Melmoth Walters (1865–1941), England and Corinthian footballer
- Percy Melmoth Walters (1863–1936), England and Corinthian footballer
- Peter Walwyn (1933–2017), racehorse trainer
- Alicia Wilson (swimmer) (born 2000)

== Adventurers, explorers, and colonists ==
- G. R. Blane (1791–1821), British surveyor and East India Company member
- David Carnegie (1871–1900), explorer and gold prospector in Western Australia
- Augustine Courtauld (1904–1959), yachtsman and British Arctic explorer
- Captain Mark John Currie (1795–1874), a figure in the formation of the Swan River Colony
- Ernest Ayscoghe Floyer (1852–1903), English colonial official and explorer
- John Richard Hardy (1807–1858), English-born Australian pastoralist and gold commissioner
- Wilfrid Noyce (1917–1962), mountaineer and writer, member of the 1953 Everest Expedition
- Gifford Palgrave (1826–1888), traveller and diplomat
- Stephen Venables (born 1954), mountaineer and writer
- John Washington (1633–1677), Virginia planter and great-grandfather of George Washington
- Roger Williams (c. 1603–1683), religious dissenter and co-founder of Rhode Island

== Others ==
- Merlin Minshall (1906–1987), Lieutenant-Commander in the Naval Intelligence Division often claimed to have been one of the inspirations for James Bond
- Peter Newton (1926–2008), winemaker
- Amar Singh (born 1989), art and non-fungible token (NFT) dealer, philanthropist, women's rights and LGBTQ+ activist, and film producer

== Fictional Old Carthusians ==
- Giles Wemmbley-Hogg (created 2002, born c. 1984), fictional BBC Radio 4 character
- Major Quive-Smith (created 1939, born c.1900) from Geoffrey Household's Rogue Male; a British-educated gestapo officer and the book's chief antagonist.
