= Old Carthusians =

Old Carthusians may refer to:

- Old Carthusians F.C., an English football club
- List of Old Carthusians, a list of notable alumni of Charterhouse School
