= Campbell Hulton =

British cricketer

Campbell Arthur Grey Hulton (16 March 1846 – 23 June 1919) was an English cricketer active from 1869 to 1882 who played for Lancashire. He was born in Manchester and died in Marylebone. He appeared in eight first-class matches as a righthanded batsman, scoring 80 runs with a highest score of 19 and held six catches. His sons were Campbell Blethyn Hulton and John Meredith Hulton.
