= Christopher Jackson (author) =

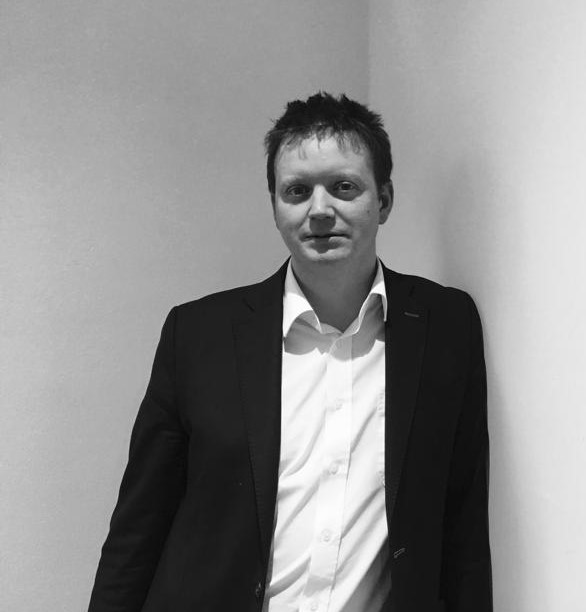
- Born: Christopher Jackson; Surrey, England
- Education: Charterhouse School
- Alma mater: University of Nottingham
- Employer: Finito
- Title: News director, Finito; Deputy editor, Spear's (2016–2019)
- Website: www.christopherjacksonart.com

Christopher Jackson is a British author, journalist, poet, digital painter and businessman who is the current news director of Finito. He has published six books and has written for publications such as The Times, New Statesman, City A.M., and Country Life. As a journalist, he was the deputy editor of Spear's between 2016 and 2019.

Jackson has appeared on television and radio stations such as BFMTV, DR, Bloomberg, BBC Radio 4, and ORF.

As a biographer, he has written biographies of Theresa May, Roger Federer, and Joe Biden.

== Biography ==
Jackson was born in Surrey, United Kingdom. His grandfather George Pattinson was a boat collector who founded the Windermere Jetty Museum at Windermere. Jackson is also related to British painter Winifred Nicholson by marriage since the Nicholson family is his mother's cousins. His father, Gordon Jackson, currently runs a family company.

Jackson was educated at the Charterhouse School. He received BA in history from University of Nottingham.

In 2013, his work, The Gallery, was published by the University of Salzburg, and received critical acclaim.

In 2017, his biography of Roger Federer, Roger Federer: Portrait of an Artist, was published. The book was reviewed by the New Statesman and The Canberra Times. In the book, Christopher Jackson attempts to explain the excitement of the Wimbledon champion's fans and covers his life from an artistic point of view.

In 2018, he published Theresa May: Power, Chaos, and Chance, a biography about the former prime minister of the United Kingdom, Theresa May. The book covered Brexit and Theresa May's role in it. Jackson compared her determination with Margaret Thatcher.

In 2021, he wrote a book about Joe Biden, the then-current president of the United States, named President Joe Biden: Healer-In-Chief.

== Awards ==
- National Poetry Prize (2016)

== Bibliography ==
- The Gallery (2013)
- The Fragile Democracy: The Race for the US Presidency (2016)
- Roger Federer: Portrait of an Artist (2017)
- Theresa May: Power, Chaos and Chance (2018)
- President Joe Biden: Healer-In-Chief (2021)
