= Andrew Tooke =

Andrew Tooke (1673–1732) was an English scholar, headmaster of Charterhouse School, Gresham Professor of Geometry, Fellow of the Royal Society and translator of Tooke's Pantheon, a standard textbook for a century on Greek and Roman mythology.

== Life ==
He was second son of Benjamin Tooke, stationer of London, and received his education in the Charterhouse school. He was admitted a scholar of Clare Hall, Cambridge, in 1690, took the degree of B.A. in 1693, and commenced M.A. in 1697.

In 1695 he had become usher in the Charterhouse school, and on 5 July 1704 he was elected professor of geometry in Gresham College in succession to Robert Hooke. On 30 November 1704 he was chosen a fellow of the Royal Society, which held its meetings in his chambers, until they left the college in 1710.

He was chosen master of the Charterhouse on 17 July 1728 in the place of Thomas Walker. He had taken deacon's orders and sometimes preached, but devoted himself principally to education. On 26 June 1729 he resigned his professorship in Gresham College. He died on 20 January 1732, and was buried in the chapel of the Charterhouse, where a monument was erected to his memory. In May 1729 he had married the widow of Dr. Henry Levett, physician to the Charterhouse.

== Works ==
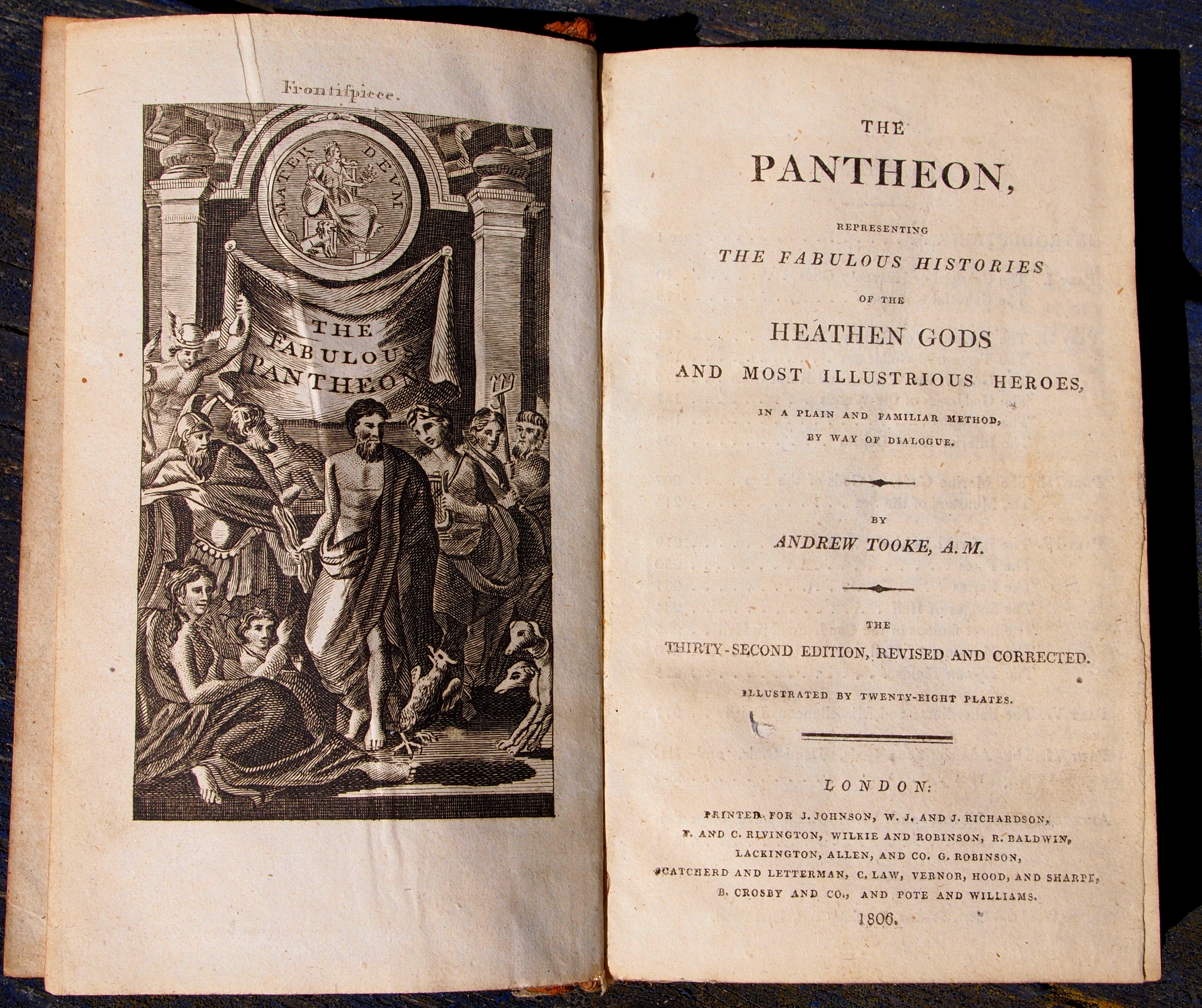
The Pantheon, representing the fabulous histories of the heathen gods and most illustrious heroes. 32nd edition, 1806.

His works are:

- The Pantheon, representing the fabulous histories of the heathen gods and most illustrious heroes, illustrated with copperplates. This work is a translation from the Latin of fr:François-Antoine Pomey's Pantheum Mythicum. 1st edition, London, 1694; 2nd edition, London 1698; 7th edition, London, 1717; 35th edition, London, 1824.
- Synopsis Graecae Linguae, London, 1711.
- The Whole Duty of Man, according to the Law of Nature, translated from the Latin Samuel von Pufendorf, 4th edit. London, 1716.
- Institutiones Christianae, London, 1718, a translation of the Christian Institutes, by Francis Gastrell.
- An edition of Ovid's Fasti, London, 1720.
- An edition of William Walker's Treatise of English Particles, London, 1720.
- 'Copy of the last Will and Testament of Sir Thomas Gresham . . . with some Accounts concerning Gresham College, taken from the last Edition of Stow's "Survey of London"' (anon.), London, 1724 (some of these accounts were originally written by him).
- Epistles distinguished by the letters A. Z. in the English edition of Pliny's Epistles, 11 vols. London, 1724.
