= Leonard Furber =

English cricketer and British Army officer

Personal information
- Full name: Leonard Duckworth Furber
- Born: 4 August 1880; Marylebone, Middlesex, England
- Died: 27 May 1912 (aged 31); Fermoy, Ireland
- Batting: Unknown

Domestic team information
- Years: Team
- 1902/03: Europeans
- 1902/03: Bombay

Career statistics
Competition	First-class
Matches	2
Runs scored	37
Batting average	12.33
100s/50s	–/–
Top score	18
Catches/stumpings	1/–
- Source: ESPNcricinfo, 11 November 2021

Leonard Duckworth Furber (4 August 1880 – 27 May 1912) was an English first-class cricketer and British Army officer.

Furber was born to Charles and Emily Darrell Louisa Furber at Marylebone in August 1880; he was a twin, with his twin-brother being named Harold. He was educated alongside his twin at Charterhouse School. After leaving Charterhouse, Furber joined the British Army and was commissioned into the Suffolk Regiment as a second lieutenant in February 1899, before transferring to the King's Shropshire Light Infantry in January 1901. Furber served in British India during the early years of the new century, where he played first-class cricket twice in 1902. His first match came for the Europeans against the Parsees in the Bombay Presidency Match, while the second came for Bombay against the touring Oxford University Authentics team. He scored 37 runs across these two matches, with a highest score of 18. Besides playing first-class cricket, he was known to be an aggressive batsman in services cricket, one hitting 10 sixes and 23 fours in an innings.

In the Shropshire Light Infantry, he was promoted to lieutenant in March 1905, with promotion to captain following in March 1910. While serving in Ireland at Fermoy, he became ill with appendicitis which required an operation. He died following the operation in May 1912, having suffered post-op complications caused by peritonitis. He had a second brother, Edward, who was a noted obstetrician and surgeon.
