= Edward Price Furber =

British obstetrician and surgeon

Edward Price Furber CBE (1864 – 9 August 1940) was a British obstetrician and surgeon.

Furber was the son of Charles Furber. He was educated at Charterhouse School and trained as a doctor at St Bartholomew's Hospital in London. He became obstetric physician at Lady Howard de Walden’s Hospital for Officers' Wives and during the First World War worked at the McCaul Military Hospital and Mackinnon Military Hospital, for which services he was appointed Commander of the Order of the British Empire (CBE) in January 1920. He later became honorary medical superintendent of St Luke's Hospital for Advanced Cases.

Furber married Olive Mann in 1890; they had one son and two daughters. His son, Stanhope, also became a surgeon. His brother was the cricketer Leonard Furber.
