= Gavin Roynon =

English cricketer, teacher, and military historian

Personal information
- Full name: Gavin Devonald Roynon
- Born: 26 April 1936; Sutton, Surrey, England
- Died: 2 March 2018 (aged 81); Wargrave, Berkshire, England
- Batting: Right-handed
- Bowling: Leg break

Domestic team information
- Years: Team
- 1954–1958: Oxfordshire
- 1958: Oxford University

Career statistics
Competition	First-class
Matches	9
Runs scored	188
Batting average	14.46
100s/50s	–/1
Top score	58
Catches/stumpings	10/–
- Source: Cricinfo, 25 June 2019

Gavin Devonald Roynon (26 April 1936 – 2 March 2018) was an English first-class cricketer, teacher and military historian.

Roynon was born at Sutton in April 1936. He was educated at Charterhouse School, before going up to Worcester College, Oxford where he studied modern languages. While studying at Oxford, he made his debut in first-class cricket for Oxford University against the touring New Zealanders at Oxford in 1958. He made eight further first-class appearances for Oxford, all coming in the 1958 season. He scored 188 runs in these matches, at an average of 14.46 and a high score of 58. In addition to playing first-class cricket while at Oxford, Ronyon also played minor counties cricket for Oxfordshire between 1954–58, making five appearances in the Minor Counties Championship. While at Oxford he was an accomplished rackets player, gaining a blue in the sport.

After graduating from Oxford, he became a history teacher at Eton College, a position he held until his retirement in 1999. Following his retirement he wrote several books on history, mostly on the subject of the First World War, including the publishing of three diaries from individuals involved in the war. He died following a four-year-long illness in March 2018. He was survived by his wife, five children and fifteen grandchildren.
