= Patrick Rucker =

English cricketer and soldier

Personal information
- Full name: Patrick William Rucker
- Born: 5 May 1900; Chislehurst, Kent, England
- Died: 20 May 1940 (aged 40); Amiens, Picardy, France
- Batting: Unknown
- Bowling: Left-arm medium
- Relatives: Charles Rucker (brother)

Domestic team information
- Years: Team
- 1919: Oxford University

Career statistics
Competition	First-class
Matches	7
Runs scored	48
Batting average	8.00
100s/50s	–/–
Top score	17
Balls bowled	876
Wickets	11
Bowling average	42.00
5 wickets in innings	–
10 wickets in match	–
Best bowling	4/107
Catches/stumpings	2/–
- Source: Cricinfo, 23 March 2020

Patrick William Rucker (5 May 1900 – 20 May 1940) was an English first-class cricketer and British Army officer.

Rucker was born at Chislehurst in May 1900. He was educated at Charterhouse School, before going up to Brasenose College, Oxford. While studying at Oxford, he played first-class cricket for Oxford University in 1919. In his debut match against the Gentlemen of England at Oxford, he bowled the first delivery in first-class cricket since the 1918 Armistice and the first since the suspension of first-class cricket in 1914. He made seven first-class appearances for Oxford in 1919, which included playing in The University Match against Cambridge. He took 11 wickets with his left-arm medium pace bowling, at an average of 42.00 and best figures of 4 for 107.

Rucker married Betty Fairweather at High Wycombe in 1927. He later served in the Second World War, being commissioned as a second lieutenant in the Royal Sussex Regiment in November 1939. He fought during the Battle of France in May 1940, travelling to Amiens via Abbeville and Lens, all the while the regiment was harassed by Luftwaffe dive-bombers. On 20 May, his battalion was attacked at Amiens by a motorcycle battalion of the 1st Panzer Division, during which Rucker was killed in action. He is commemorated at the Dunkirk Memorial. His brother, Robin, was killed during the First World War in service with the Royal Air Force, while another brother, Charles, also fought in the First World War, with the army, and played first-class cricket.
