= William Walker (schoolmaster) =

English schoolmaster and grammarian

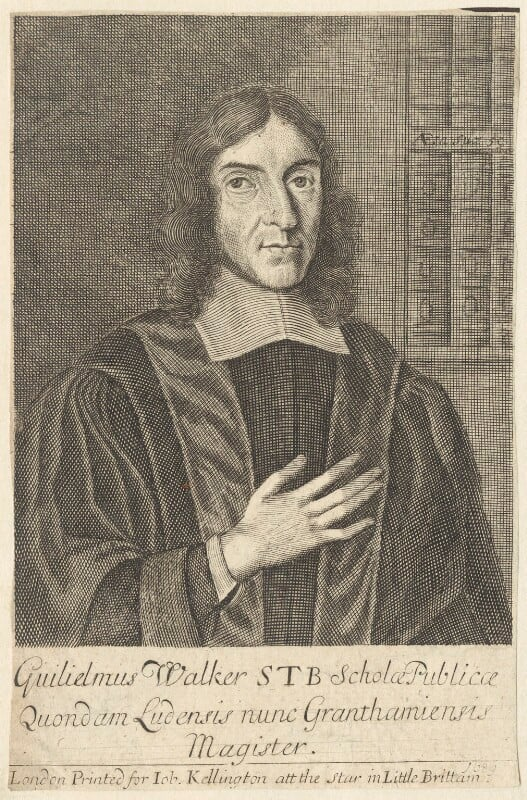
- Born: 1623; Lincoln, England
- Died: 1 August 1684 (aged 60–61)
- Occupations: Schoolmaster and grammarian

William Walker (1623 – 1 August 1684) was an English schoolmaster and grammarian.

== Biography ==
Walker was born in Lincoln, England in 1623, and educated at the public school there. He proceeded to Trinity College, Cambridge, where he took his degree. He taught for some time at a private school at Fiskerton, Nottinghamshire, was headmaster of Louth grammar school, and subsequently of Grantham grammar school, where he is erroneously said to have had Sir Isaac Newton as a pupil. Newton, however, had left the Grantham grammar school while Walker's predecessor, Mr. Stokes, was still at its head, but there existed a friendship of some intimacy between the two when Walker was vicar of Colsterworth, after he had left Grantham. Walker died on 1 August 1684.

Walker's works show his two chief interests, pedagogy and theology. As a pedagogue he gained a considerable reputation in his time, and was known as "Particles" Walker from his book on that subject. His chief works are:

- "A Dictionary of English and Latin Idioms," London, 1670.
- "Phraseologia Anglo-Latina, to which is added Parœmiologia Anglo-Latina," London 1672.
- "A Treatise of English Particles," London, 1673, which has gone through many editions and been the subject of a great number of editorial comments.
- "The Royal (Lily's) Grammar explained," London, 1674.
- "A Modest Plea for Infants' Baptism," Cambridge, 1677.
- "Βαπτισμῶν Διδαχή, the Doctrine of Baptisms," London, 1678.
- "English Examples of Latin Syntaxis," London, 1683.
- "Some Improvements to the Art of Teaching," London, 1693.
