= Cecil Parry =

English cricketer

Cecil Wynne Parry (6 August 1866 – 4 January 1901) was an English cricketer who played in one first-class cricket match for Cambridge University in 1889. He was born in Clifton, Bristol and died at York.

Parry was educated at Charterhouse School and at Trinity College, Cambridge. He played in trial matches for the Cambridge University cricket team in 1888 but was not picked for any first eleven matches that year. In 1889, he played in one first-team match as a lower-order right-handed batsman and a right-arm medium-pace bowler; he scored 7 and 9 and failed to take a wicket in ten overs.

Parry graduated from Cambridge University with a Bachelor of Arts degree in 1889. From 1890 to 1897 he was an assistant master at Wellington College, Berkshire. He died from peritonitis after contracting influenza.
