= Eyton Butts =

Anglican priest

Eyton Butts was an Anglican priest in the 18th century.

The son of Robert Butts, Bishop of Norwich from 1733 to 1738, he was educated at Charterhouse and St Catharine's College, Cambridge. He was Dean of Cloyne from 1770 until his death in 1779.
