= Tony Jakobson =

English cricketer

Personal information
- Full name: Tony Robert Jakobson
- Born: 17 December 1937 (age 88); Marylebone, London, England
- Batting: Right-handed
- Bowling: Right-arm fast-medium

Domestic team information
- Years: Team
- 1960–1961: Oxford University

Career statistics
Competition	First-class
Matches	14
Runs scored	112
Batting average	9.33
100s/50s	–/–
Top score	20
Balls bowled	2,762
Wickets	37
Bowling average	32.00
5 wickets in innings	1
10 wickets in match	–
Best bowling	5/61
Catches/stumpings	10/–
- Source: Cricinfo, 18 May 2020

Tony Robert Jakobson (born 17 December 1937) is an English former first-class cricketer.

Jakobson was born at Marylebone in December 1937. He was educated at Charterhouse School, before going up to University College, Oxford. While studying at Oxford, he played first-class cricket for Oxford University, making his debut against the Free Foresters at Oxford in 1960. He played first-class cricket for Oxford until 1961, making a total of fourteen appearances. Playing primarily as a right-arm fast-medium bowler, he took a total of 37 wickets in his fourteen first-class matches at an average of 32.00 and best figures of 5 for 61, which represented his only five wicket haul. As a batsman, he scored 112 runs with a high score of 20.

Jakobson later became a horse racing tipster at Newmarket, where he wrote the Pin Money column in the Newmarket Journal for nearly fifty years, before stepping down in May 2020.
