= Tooke's Pantheon =

1698 translation into English of Pantheum mythicum, seu fabulosa deorum historia

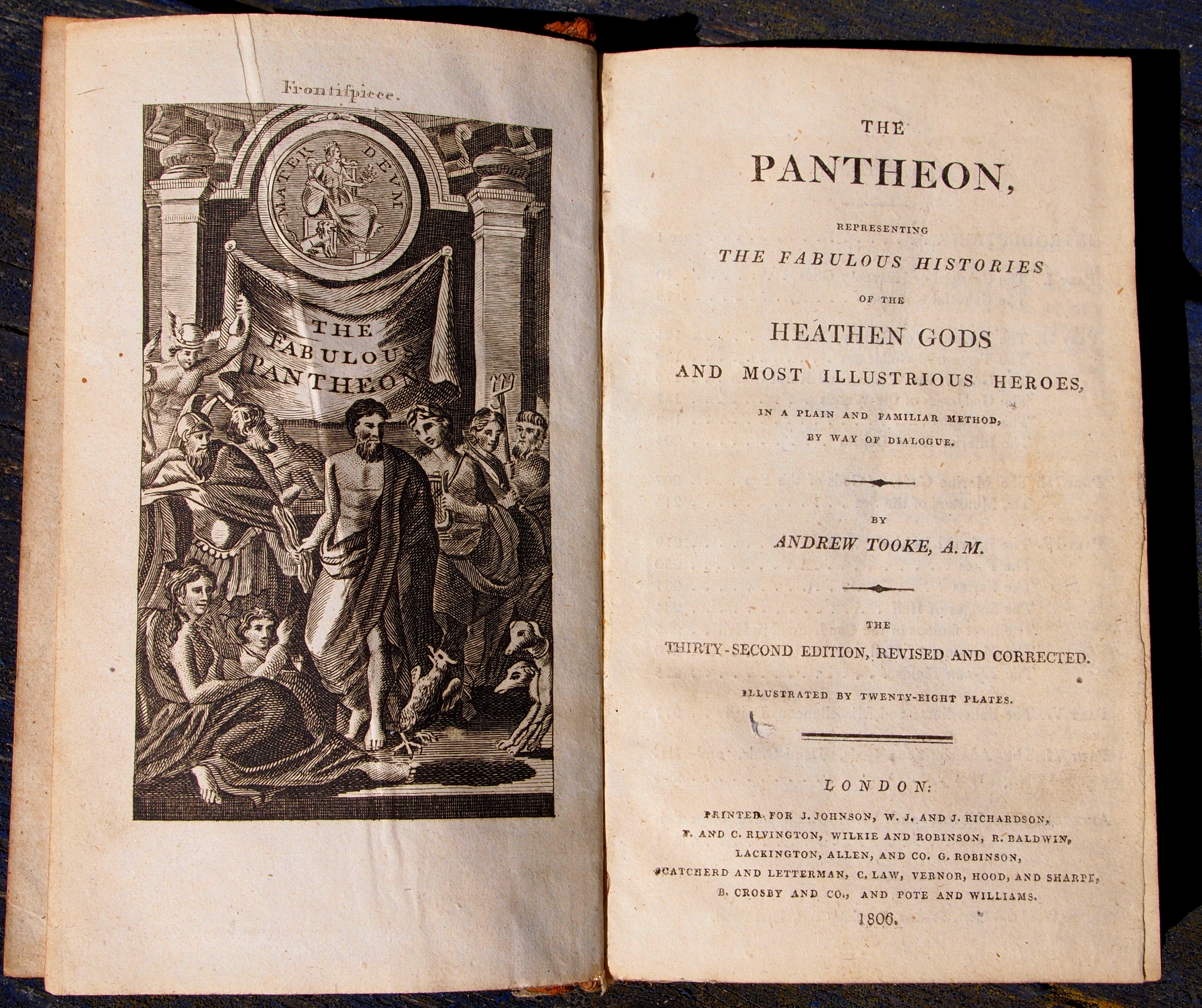
The Pantheon, representing the fabulous histories of the heathen gods and most illustrious heroes. 32nd edition, 1806.

Tooke’s Pantheon is the informal name of The Pantheon, representing the fabulous histories of the heathen gods and most illustrious heroes, in a short, plain and familiar method by way of dialogue, which first appeared in 1694. The Pantheon is Andrew Tooke’s translation of fr:François-Antoine Pomey’s Pantheum mythicum, seu Fabulosa deorum historia, which was originally published in Latin in 1659. Both Tooke's English Pantheon and Pomey's Latin original remained popular texts for students of Greek and Roman mythology for well over a century.

Tooke never mentioned Pomey in his introductory "To the reader" and Pomey's name disappeared from the title page of the 6th edition in 1713 while Tooke's name remained. Thus, the work became known in the 18th century as Tooke's Pantheon. However, Tooke's name did not become part of its printed title until the nineteenth century. It was reprinted twenty-three times by 1771. It was published as "adapted for the use of students of every age and either sex" in the United States as late as 1859.
