= John Hulton =

English cricketer British Army officer

Personal information
- Full name: John Meredith Hulton
- Born: 8 January 1882; Whalley Range, Lancashire, England
- Died: 13 July 1942 (aged 60); Poole, Dorset, England
- Batting: Unknown
- Bowling: Unknown
- Relatives: Campbell Hulton senior (father); Campbell Hulton junior (brother)

Domestic team information
- Years: Team
- 1903–1905: Marylebone Cricket Club

Career statistics
Competition	First-class
Matches	3
Runs scored	127
Batting average	25.40
100s/50s	–/1
Top score	65
Balls bowled	24
Wickets	0
Bowling average	–
5 wickets in innings	–
10 wickets in match	–
Best bowling	–
Catches/stumpings	1/–
- Source: Cricinfo, 25 April 2021

John Meredith Hulton CBE DSO (8 January 1882 – 13 July 1942) was an English first-class cricketer and British Army officer.

The son of Campbell Arthur Grey Hulton, he was born in January 1882 at Whalley Range, Lancashire and was educated at Charterhouse School. After completing his education, Hulton chose a career in the military. He was commissioned as a second lieutenant into the 5th (Royal Westminster Militia) Battalion, Royal Fusiliers, in September 1900. He immediately served in the Second Boer War, during which he was promoted to lieutenant in May 1901. Following the war Hulton transferred to the Royal Sussex Regiment in July 1903; because he was transferring from a militia battalion, he entered the Royal Sussex Regiment as a second lieutenant. Having returned to England, Hulton played three first-class cricket matches for the Marylebone Cricket Club in 1903 and 1905, playing against London County in 1903, and in 1905 Kent and Leicestershire. His three matches yielded him 127 runs, with a highest score of 65 against Kent at Lord's.

He gained promotion to lieutenant in September 1906, before gaining the temporary rank of captain while seconded as an adjutant in the Territorial Force in November 1912. Hulton served with the Royal Sussex Regiment in the First World War. In the first year of the conflict he gained the full rank of captain in November 1914. He later served in the Gallipoli campaign, seeing action during the Landing at Suvla Bay in August 1915 and the subsequent Battle of Scimitar Hill on 21 August with the 1/4 Royal Sussex Regiment, where he testified to confusion in the midst of the battle and the retreating wounded soldiers of the Royal Dublin Fusiliers. By July 1916, he was seconded to headquarters as a brigade-major, but had returned to the Royal Sussex Regiment by January 1917, when he was promoted to major. Two months later he was appointed to the general staff, with secondment to the Welch Regiment following later in 1917. He was appointed to the temporary rank of lieutenant colonel in September 1917 while commanding a battalion, but relinquished the rank in November 1917 upon him ceasing to be in command of a battalion. His relinquishment was short-lived, as the following month he was reinserted into the temporary rank while once again commanding a battalion. Hulton was awarded the Distinguished Service Order in the 1918 Birthday Honours for valuable services rendered in connection with military operations in Egypt, in addition to being decorated by Egypt with the Order of the Nile, 3rd Class.

Shortly after being wounded at the Battle of Beersheba, Hulton volunteered for General Alfred Knox's mission to Eastern Russia during the Russian Civil War. There he commanded a training school on Russky Island and fought against General Radola Gajda's coup attempt in November 1919. For his services during the Russian Civil War he was made a CBE and was additionally decorated in August 1921 by the Empire of Japan with the Order of the Rising Sun, 4th Class. He was made a brevet lieutenant colonel in January 1923 and transferred to the Tank Corps in July 1923. Hulton transferred to the Tank Corps in July 1923. He was the chief instructor at the Royal Corps Central Schools at Bovington Camp from 1931 to 1935. He retired from active service in May 1935, at which point he held the rank of colonel Hulton died at Poole in July 1942. His brother, Campbell Blethyn Hulton, was also a first-class cricketer.
