= Alastair Mackie =

- Born: 3 August 1922; Yorkshire, England
- Died: 19 May 2018 (aged 95)
- Military career
- Allegiance: United Kingdom
- Branch: Royal Air Force
- Service years: 1940–1968
- Rank: Air Commodore
- Commands: RAF Colerne; No. 101 Squadron RAF
- Conflicts: Second World War
- Awards: Commander of the Order of the British Empire; Distinguished Flying Cross & Bar; Queen's Commendation for Valuable Service in the Air; Legion of Honour (France)
- Other work: Vice President, Campaign for Nuclear Disarmament

Air Commodore Alastair Cavendish Lindsay Mackie, CBE, DFC & Bar (3 August 1922 – 19 May 2018) was a senior officer in the Royal Air Force and later a campaigner for nuclear disarmament.
