= Charles Rucker =

English cricketer and British Army officer

Personal information
- Full name: Charles Edward Sigismund Rucker
- Born: 4 September 1894; Chislehurst, Kent, England
- Died: 24 November 1965 (aged 71); Blandford Forum, Dorset, England
- Batting: Right-handed
- Bowling: Right-arm fast
- Relatives: Patrick Rucker (brother)

Domestic team information
- Years: Team
- 1914: Oxford University

Career statistics
Competition	First-class
Matches	5
Runs scored	66
Batting average	13.20
100s/50s	–/–
Top score	26*
Balls bowled	633
Wickets	13
Bowling average	22.33
5 wickets in innings	2
10 wickets in match	–
Best bowling	6/69
Catches/stumpings	1/–
- Source: Cricinfo, 22 June 2020

Charles Edward Sigismund Rucker MC (4 September 1894 – 24 November 1965) was an English first-class cricketer and British Army officer.

Rucker was born at Chislehurst in September 1894. He was educated at Charterhouse School, before going up to University College, Oxford. While studying at Oxford, Rucker made five appearances in first-class cricket for Oxford University in 1914. A right-arm fast bowler, he took 13 wickets at an average of 22.23, with two five wicket hauls and best figures of 6 for 69. With the bat, he scored 66 runs with a high score of 26 not out.

His studies at Oxford were interrupted by the First World War, with Rucker being commissioned in the British Army in October 1916 as a second lieutenant. He was a temporary lieutenant in the Rifle Brigade (The Prince Consort's Own) by October 1915, He was decorated with the Military Cross (MC) in January 1916, the citation for which appeared in The London Gazette that month and reads as follows:

For conspicuous gallantry on the night of 15th-16th December, 1915, at Cordonnerie. He took out two parties to cut wire before a raid, and commenced work, but, being interrupted by an enemy listening post, he returned to report. The enemy being aroused, the raid was abandoned, but Lieutenant Rucker took out a bombing party and destroyed the listening post under a heavy fire. This post was inside the German wire and close to the enemy's parapet. He volunteered for both these duties.

He relinquished his commission in January 1918 on account of ill health, having lost a leg in action.

Following the end of the war, Rucker returned to study at Oxford, though played no further first-class cricket due to the loss of his leg. He served as the secretary of Oxford University Cricket Club in 1919. Rucker died at Blandford Forum in November 1965. His brother, Patrick, also played first-class cricket for Oxford and was killed during the Second World War, while another brother, Robin, was killed during the First World War in service with the Royal Air Force.
