= Campbell Hulton (cricketer, born 1877) =

English cricketer, barrister and clergyman

Personal information
- Full name: Campbell Blethyn Hulton
- Born: 30 May 1877; Whalley Range, Lancashire, England
- Died: 10 April 1947 (aged 69); Mentmore, Bedfordshire, England
- Batting: Unknown
- Relatives: Campbell Hulton senior (father); John Hulton (brother)

Domestic team information
- Years: Team
- 1903: Marylebone Cricket Club

Career statistics
Competition	First-class
Matches	1
Runs scored	4
Batting average	2.00
100s/50s	–/–
Top score	4
Catches/stumpings	2/–
- Source: Cricinfo, 13 September 2021

Campbell Blethyn Hulton ChStJ (30 May 1877 — 10 April 1947) was an English first-class cricketer, barrister and clergyman.

The son of Campbell Arthur Grey Hulton, he was born in May 1877 at Whalley Range, Lancashire and was educated at Charterhouse School, where he played for the cricket and football elevens. From there he went up to Magdalen College, Oxford. He graduated in 1902 and was called to the bar as a member of the Inner Temple in 1903. In the same year that he was called to the bar, Hulton played one first-class cricket match for the Marylebone Cricket Club (MCC) against London County at Crystal Palace. Batting twice in the match, he was dismissed for 4 runs in the MCC first innings by Joe Vine, while in their second innings he was dismissed without scoring by Carst Posthuma. In the field, he took two catches.

Hulton was also ordained as a priest in the Church of England in 1903, being appointed curate of Melton Mowbray. He was appointed rector of Turvey in Bedfordshire in 1906, a post he held until 1910, when he was appointed rector of Worsley in Manchester. Hulton was appointed as a chaplain to the Order of Saint John in August 1916. Hulton died in April 1947 at Mentmore, Bedfordshire. His brother, John, was also a first-class cricketer.
