= John Cazenove =

English businessman and political economist (1788–1879)

John Cazenove (1788–1879) was an English businessman and political economist.

== Life ==
He was the elder brother of Philip Cazenove, who in 1823 founded Cazenove the firm of stockbrokers.

Cazenove was educated at Charterhouse School. He is thought by Patricia James to have met Robert Malthus through Charles Webb Le Bas.

After Malthus died in 1834, Cazenove applied for the teaching vacancy at the East India College. The position went to Richard Jones.

== Works ==
Cazenove has been considered one of the "Cambridge Inductivist" group of intellectuals. As an economist he was a supporter of Malthus; and according to Pullen, he was the editor of the second edition (1836) of the Principles of Malthus. James comments that it is now impossible to know whether the views in that edition are those of Malthus or the editor.

In 1853, Cazenove revised Malthus's Definitions in Political Economy, which had first been published in 1827.

The list of publications by Cazenove is still not clarified by scholars. He was a reviewer for the British Critic, and at this period the custom was that reviews were unsigned. There is some debate about a series of reviews in the British Critic, ten from the years 1815 to 1824, that related to economic topics and apparently voiced views close to Malthus. One such review, Malthus on Political Economy, took the opportunity to enter the Malthus–Ricardo debate, attacking the inverse wage-profit relationship of David Ricardo. Some or all of these have been attributed to Cazenove. But the external evidence to show his authorship is absent. He is known to have reviewed works of John Ramsay McCulloch (1824) and Thomas Chalmers (1832). Of other publications, Cazenove wrote 11, of which seven were published anonymously.

In 1859 Cazenove edited the Literary Remains of Richard Jones. They were published with a preface by William Whewell.

Cazenove was also a chess player, and published a selection of games in 1817.

== Family ==
Cazenove married in 1815 Harriet Hillyard Gibson (died 1835), daughter of James Gibson of Epsom.

The Anglican theologian and author, Rev John Gibson Cazenove DD FRSE (1822–1896), Chancellor of Edinburgh Cathedral, was their son.
