= List of Old Etonians born in the 19th century =

The following notable Old Boys of Eton College were born in the 19th century.

== 1800s ==
- William Hay, 18th Earl of Erroll (1801–1846)
- Winthrop Mackworth Praed (1802–1839), poet and politician
- Sir John William Lubbock (1803–1865), Vice-Chancellor, University of London, 1837–1842, astronomer and mathematician
- Sir Edward Branch (1803-1871), British Army officer
- Field Marshal Lord William Paulet GCB (1804–1893), British Army officer
- James Harris, 3rd Earl of Malmesbury (1807–1889), Secretary of State for Foreign Affairs, 1852, 1858–1859, and Lord Privy Seal, 1866–1868, 1874–1876
- Frederick Tennyson (1807–1898), poet
- William Cavendish, 7th Duke of Devonshire (1808–1891), politician and benefactor of science and industry
- William Ewart Gladstone (1809–1898), President of the Board of Trade, 1843–1845, Colonial Secretary, 1845–1846, Chancellor of the Exchequer, 1852–1855, 1859–1866, and Prime Minister, 1868–1874, 1880–1885, 1886, 1892–1894
- Alexander Kinglake (1809–1891), military historian
- George Selwyn (1809–1878), Bishop of New Zealand, 1841–1867, and Lichfield, 1868–1878

== 1810s ==
- George Harris, 3rd Baron Harris (1810–1872), Governor of Madras, 1854–1859
- James Milnes Gaskell (1810–1873), politician, Lord of the Treasury
- Charles Kean (1811–1868), actor
- John Bowes (1811–1885), art collector, founder of the Bowes Museum
- Arthur Henry Hallam (1811–1833), poet
- Rodolphus de Salis (1811–1880), Colonel of the 8th Hussars
- William Fane de Salis (businessman) (1812–1896), company chairman
- Robert Moore (1812–1857), cricketer and clergyman
- John Story (1812–1872), cricketer
- John Dolignon (1813–1896), cricketer
- Robert Sutton (1813–1885), first-class cricketer and reverend
- Sir Arthur Borton (1814–1893), Governor of Malta, 1878–1884
- Sir John William Kaye KCSI (1814 – 1876), military historian, civil servant and army officer.
- Arthur Kinnaird, 10th Lord Kinnaird (1814–1887), banker, politician and philanthropist
- Sir John Lawes (1814–1899), agriculturist
- George Vance (1814–1839), cricketer
- Lieutenant-Colonel Douglas Labalmondière (1815–1893), Assistant Commissioner of Police of the Metropolis, 1856–1888
- John Charles Ryle (1816–1900), Anglican evangelical theologian and first Bishop of Liverpool
- Thomas Gambier Parry (1816–1888), English artist and art collector
- Edmund Beckett, 1st Baron Grimthorpe (1816–1905), Chancellor and Vicar-General of the Province of York, 1877–1900, and clock designer
- Leopold Fane De Salis (1816–1898), Australian pastoralist and politician
- George Seymour (1816–1838), cricketer
- Henry Woodyer (1816–1896)
- Sir Algernon Coote, 11th Baronet (1817–1899), Irish cricketer and clergyman
- Frederick Garnett (1817–1874), cricketer
- George Lyttelton, 4th Baron Lyttelton of Frankley (1817–1876), politician and co-founder of Canterbury, New Zealand
- Lieutenant-General Lord Henry Percy (1817–1877), Crimean War Victoria Cross
- John Coleridge, 1st Baron Coleridge (1820–1894), Attorney General, 1871–1873, Chief Justice of the Common Pleas, 1873–1880, and Lord Chief Justice, 1880–1894
- Sir John Carmichael-Anstruther, 6th Baronet (1818–1831), shot at Eton
- John Wynne (1819–1893), cricketer and clergyman

== 1820s ==
- Tsatur Khan (1820–1905), General and Persian Envoy to Russia
- Sir Richard Garth (1820–1903), Chief Justice of Bengal, 1875–1886
- Edward Thring (1821–1887), Headmaster of Uppingham School, 1853–1887
- Maxwell Blacker (1822–1888), cricketer and clergyman
- John Francis Campbell of Islay (1822–1885), Gaelic scholar
- John Buller (1823–1867), cricketer and soldier
- William Johnson Cory (1823–1892), poet
- Horatio Nelson, 3rd Earl Nelson (1823–1913), Politician
- Henry Hildyard (1824–1898), cricketer and clergyman
- J. L. Joynes Sr. (1824–1908), clergyman and schoolmaster
- Robert Honywood (1825–1870), cricketer
- William Spottiswoode (1825–1883), President of the Royal Society, 1878–1883, mathematician and physicist
- Frederick Coleridge (1826–1906), cricketer and clergyman
- Thomas Levett, 1826, later Levett-Prinsep of Croxall Hall, Derbyshire
- General Sir George Higginson (1826–1927), Crimean War soldier, commander of the Brigade of Guards
- Lieutenant-Colonel Sir Charles Russell (1826–1883), Crimean War Victoria Cross and politician
- John Coleridge Patteson (1827–1871), Bishop of Melanesia, 1861–1871, and martyr
- Sir Charles Oakeley, 4th Baronet (1828–1915), cricketer and soldier
- Frederick Eden (1829–1916), cricketer
- Lieutenant-General Sir Charles Fraser (1829–1895), Indian Mutiny Victoria Cross
- Henry Agar-Ellis, 3rd Viscount Clifden, won both Derby and St. Leger in 1848
- Sir James Fitzjames Stephen (1829–1894), judge

== 1830s ==
- Edwin Blake (1830–1914), civil engineer and politician in New Zealand
- William Brodrick, 8th Viscount Midleton (1830–1907), peer and politician
- Robert Cecil, 3rd Marquess of Salisbury (1830–1903), Secretary of State for India, 1866–1867, 1874–1878, Secretary of State for Foreign Affairs, 1878–1880, 1885–1886, 1887–1892, 1895–1900, and Prime Minister, 1885–1886, 1886–1892, 1895–1902
- James Payn (1830–1898), novelist, poet, editor and journalist
- Clement Walker Heneage (1831–1901), Indian Mutiny Victoria Cross
- Fiennes Cornwallis 1831–1867
- Henry Labouchère (1831–1912), politician and publisher
- Sir Robert Herbert (1831–1905), first Premier of Queensland
- Lieutenant-Colonel Richard Pearson (1831–1890), Assistant Commissioner of Police of the Metropolis, 1881–1890
- George Fosbery (1832–1907), Umbeyla Expedition Victoria Cross and firearms expert
- Gerald Goodlake (1832–1890), Crimean War Victoria Cross
- Robert Loyd-Lindsay, 1st Baron Wantage (1832–1901), Crimean War Victoria Cross and politician
- Harry Moody (1832–1921), cricketer and civil servant
- Field Marshal Frederick Sleigh Roberts, 1st Earl Roberts (1832–1914), Commander-in-Chief, Madras, 1881–1885, India, 1885–1893, Ireland, 1895–1899, and South Africa, 1899–1900, Commander-in-Chief, 1901–1904, and Indian Mutiny Victoria Cross
- Sir Leslie Stephen (1832–1904), Editor, Dictionary of National Biography, 1882–1891, and writer
- Charles Stuart Aubrey Abbott, 3rd Baron Tenterden (1834–1882), diplomat
- John Lubbock, 1st Baron Avebury (1834–1913), Vice-Chancellor, University of London, 1872–1880, chairman, London County Council, 1890–1892, banker, scientist, archaeologist and author
- Edward Ede (1834–1908), cricketer, twin brother of the below
- George Ede (1834–1870), cricketer and jockey, winner of the 1868 Grand National, twin brother of the above
- Richard Durnford C.B. (1834–1934), Secretary to the Charity Commissioners of England and Wales.
- William Molyneux, 4th Earl of Sefton (1835–1897), KG, Lord Lieutenant of Lancashire
- F. C. Burnand (1836–1917), librettist, translator and dramatist
- William Hartopp (1836–1874), cricketer and soldier
- Sir Frederick Albert Bosanquet (1837–1923), Common Serjeant of London 1900–1917
- Oscar Browning (1837–1923), historian
- Algernon Charles Swinburne (1837–1909), poet
- Edmond Warre (1837–1920), oarsman and Head Master (later Provost) of Eton
- General Sir Redvers Buller (1839–1908), Adjutant General, 1890–1897, General Officer Commanding Natal, 1899–1900, and I Corps, 1901–1906, and Zulu War Victoria Cross
- Col. Sir Francis Arthur Marindin (1838–1900), Senior Inspecting Officer of Railways, Board of Trade and President of the Football Association.
- Charles Wood, 2nd Viscount Halifax (1839–1919), president of the English Church Union from 1868 to 1919
- Augustus Legge (1839-1913), Bishop of Lichfield from 1891 to 1913

== 1840s ==
- Tankerville Chamberlayne (1840–1924), Member of Parliament for Southampton
- Charles Garnett (1840–1919), cricketer
- Sir William Mackworth Young KCSI (1840–1924), Lieutenant-Governor of the Punjab
- Duncan Pocklington (1841–1870), cricketer and Oxford rower
- Osbert Mordaunt (1842–1923), cricketer
- William Rose (1842–1917), cricketer
- John William Strutt, 3rd Baron Rayleigh (1842–1919), Cavendish Professor of Experimental Physics, University of Cambridge, 1879–1884, Professor of natural philosophy, Royal Institution, 1887–1905, Secretary to the Royal Society, 1887–1896, and Nobel Laureate
- Admiral of the Fleet Sir Arthur Knyvet Wilson (1842–1921), Third Sea Lord, 1897–1901, Flag Officer Commanding Channel Squadron, 1901–1908, and Home Fleet, 1903–1907, First Sea Lord, 1909–1912, and Sudan Campaign Victoria Cross
- Edward Wynne-Finch (1842–1914), cricketer
- Sir Charles Lawes-Wittewronge (1843–1911), oarsman, cyclist, runner and sculptor
- John Boddam-Whetham (1843–1918), naturalist and cricketer
- James Saumarez, 4th Baron de Saumarez (1843–1937), diplomat
- Arthur Teape (1843–1885), cricketer
- Robert Bridges (1844–1930), Poet Laureate, 1913–1930
- Arthur John Butler (1844–1910), professor of Italian language and literature at University College, London
- Arthur Wood (1844–1933), cricketer
- Quintin Hogg (1845–1903), sugar merchant, philanthropist and Scotland footballer
- General Sir Neville Lyttelton (1845–1931), Commander-in-Chief, South Africa, 1902–1904, Chief of the General Staff, 1904–1908, General Officer Commanding-in-Chief Ireland, 1908–1912, and Governor, Royal Hospital Chelsea, 1912–1931
- John Campbell, 9th Duke of Argyll (1845–1914), Governor General of Canada, 1878–1883
- Heneage Legge (1845-1911), St George's Hanover Square MP from 1900 to 1906.
- Henry Petty-Fitzmaurice, 5th Marquess of Lansdowne (1845–1927), Governor General of Canada, 1883–1888, Viceroy of India, 1888–1893, Secretary of State for War, 1895–1900, and Secretary of State for Foreign Affairs, 1900–1905
- Charles Nicholas Paul Phipps (1845–1913), Brazil merchant and Conservative member of parliament for Westbury (1880–1885)
- Sir Frederick Pollock (1845–1937), Corpus Professor of Jurisprudence, University of Oxford, 1883–1903
- Vincent Coles (1845–1929), Principal of Pusey House, Oxford 1897–1909.
- Sir Thomas Chapman, 7th Baronet (1846–1919), father of T. E. Lawrence
- Sir Charles Edmond Knox (1846–1938), Lieutenant-General
- Edmond Fitzmaurice, 1st Baron Fitzmaurice (1846–1935), Chancellor of the Duchy of Lancaster, 1908–1909, and writer
- Charles Alexander (1847–1902), cricketer and barrister
- Lord William Beresford (1847–1900), Zulu War Victoria Cross
- Arthur Fitzgerald Kinnaird, 11th Lord Kinnaird (1847–1923), footballer, and President of the Football Association, 1890–1923
- Archibald Primrose, 5th Earl of Rosebery (1847–1929), Secretary of State for Foreign Affairs, 1892–1894, and Prime Minister, 1894–1895
- Martin Gosselin (1847–1905), Envoy Extraordinary and Minister Plenipotentiary to Portugal 1902–1905
- Arthur James Balfour, 1st Earl of Balfour (1848–1930), Prime Minister, 1902–1905, First Lord of the Admiralty, 1915–1916, and Secretary of State for Foreign Affairs, 1916–1919
- Digby Mackworth Dolben (1848–1867), poet
- Sir Henry Maxwell Lyte (1848–1940), Deputy Keeper of the Public Records, 1886–1926, and historian
- Sir Hubert Parry (1848–1918), Director, Royal College of Music, 1895–1918, Professor of Music, University of Oxford, 1899–1908, and composer
- Julian Sturgis (1848–1904), librettist who played football as an amateur for the Wanderers F.C. winning the FA Cup in 1873, and was thus the first American to win an FA Cup Final.
- Lord Randolph Churchill (1849–1894), Secretary of State for India, 1885–1886, and Chancellor of the Exchequer, 1886–1887
- Sir Joseph Dimsdale (1849–1912), Lord Mayor of London, 1901–1902, and politician
- Lieut-Col Richard W.B. Mirehouse (formerly Richard Walter Byrd Levett) (1849–1914), High Sheriff of Pembrokeshire, 1886, and Lieutenant Colonel of 4th Batt. North Staffs Regiment.

== 1850s ==
- Frederic William Maitland (1850–1906), Downing Professor of the Laws of England, University of Cambridge, 1888–1906
- Ivo Branch (1851-1928), British Army officer
- William Legge, 6th Earl of Dartmouth (1851–1936) British peer, Conservative politician, Vice-Chamberlain of the Household
- George Harris, 4th Baron Harris (1851–1932), Governor of Bombay, 1890–1895, and England cricketer
- Sir John Murray (1851–1928), publisher
- Henry Stephens Salt (1851–1939), writer, social reformer, socialist, animal rights campaigner, vegetarian, literary critic, and biographer
- Arthur Augustus Tilley (1851–1942), literary historian
- Reginald Brett, 2nd Viscount Esher (1852–1930), Secretary, Office of Works, 1895–1902, defence expert and writer
- William Ellison-Macartney (1852–1924), MP for South Antrim, 1885–1903, Governor of Tasmania, 1913–1917, Governor of Western Australia, 1917–1920
- Reginald Hargreaves (1852–1926), cricketer
- Arthur Lyttelton (1852–1903), Master of Selwyn College, Cambridge, 1882–1893
- Henry Legge (1852–1924), British soldier and courtier
- Gerald Balfour, 2nd Earl of Balfour (1853–1945) Conservative politician
- Major Ernest Gambier-Parry (1853–1936), Suakin Expedition 1885, author, musician, artist
- Mark Hanbury Beaufoy (1854–1922) Liberal member of parliament, author of 'Never, never, let your gun pointed be at anyone...'
- Alfred Clayton Cole (1854–1920), Governor of the Bank of England
- J. L. Joynes Jr. (1853–1893), journalist, writer, poet and socialist activist
- Sir Horace Plunkett (1854–1932), Irish politician and writer
- Howard Sturgis (1855–1920), novelist
- William Edwards (1855–1912), Sudan Campaign Victoria Cross
- James Lowther, 1st Viscount Ullswater (1855–1949), Conservative politician
- Edward Lyttelton (1855–1942), Headmaster of Haileybury School, 1890–1905, and Eton, 1905–1916, and writer, who made one appearance for England in 1878.
- St John Brodrick, 1st Earl of Midleton (1856–1942), Secretary of State for War, 1900–1903, and Secretary of State for India, 1903–1905
- Herbert Edward Ryle (1856–1925), Old Testament scholar and Dean of Westminster.
- Algernon Haskett-Smith (1856–1887), cricketer
- Alfred Lyttelton (1857–1913), Colonial Secretary, 1903–1905, and England footballer.
- Field Marshal Herbert Plumer, 1st Viscount Plumer (1857–1932), quartermaster general, 1904–1905, General Officer Commanding Northern Command, 1911–1914, II Corps, 1914–1915, Second Army, 1915–1917, 1918, Italian Expeditionary Force, 1917–1918, and British Army of the Rhine, 1918–1919, Governor of Malta, 1919–1924, and High Commissioner for Palestine, 1925–1928
- Walter Forbes (1858–1933), cricketer
- Sir Charles Hawtrey (1858–1923), actor-manager
- Sir Henry Miers (1858–1942), Waynflete Professor of Mineralogy, University of Oxford, 1895–1908, principal, University of London, 1908–1915, and vice-chancellor, Victoria University of Manchester, 1915–1926
- Sir Kynaston Studd (1858–1944), Lord Mayor of London, 1928–1929, and philanthropist
- George Curzon, 1st Marquess Curzon of Kedleston (1859–1925), Viceroy of India, 1899–1905, and Secretary of State for Foreign Affairs, 1919–1924
- Reginald Macaulay (1858–1937), footballer who won the FA Cup with Old Etonians in 1882 and made one appearance for England in 1878.
- Harry Goodhart (1858–1895), twice FA Cup winner and England international footballer, who went on to become Professor of Humanities at Edinburgh University.
- Arthur Chitty (1859–1908), cricketer and barrister
- Sir Lionel Cust (1859–1929), Director, National Portrait Gallery, 1895–1909, and Surveyor of the King's Pictures, 1901–1927
- Sidney Gambier-Parry (1859–1948), ecclesiastical architect
- Sir Cecil Spring Rice (1859–1918), Minister to Persia, 1906–1908, and Sweden, 1908–1912, and ambassador to the United States, 1912–1918
- James Kenneth Stephen (1859–1892), poet, tutor to Prince Albert Victor Edward (Prince Eddy), Virginia Woolf's cousin, Barrister, suffered from bi-polar disorder, one of suspects as Jack the Ripper

== 1860s ==
- Martin Hawke, 7th Baron Hawke of Towton (1860–1938), Yorkshire cricketer
- William Inge (1860–1954), Lady Margaret's Professor of Divinity, University of Cambridge, 1907–1911, and Dean of St Paul's, 1911–1934
- John Frederick Peel Rawlinson (1860–1926), footballer who won the FA Cup with Old Etonians in 1882 and made one appearance for England 1881, before serving as a member of parliament for Cambridge University from 1906 to 1926.
- Sir Eldon Gorst KCB, Consul-General in Egypt.
- George Lambton (1860–1945), British flat racing Champion Trainer 1906, 1911 and 1912
- Major-General Lawrence Drummond (1861–1946), First World War general
- Arthur Cairns, 2nd Earl Cairns (1861–1890), Private Secretary to the President of the Board of Trade
- Stanley Mordaunt Leathes (1861–1938), poet, historian and senior civil servant
- Walter Henry Montagu Douglas Scott (1861–1886), Scottish cricketer and nobleman
- A. C. Benson (1862–1925), Master of Magdalene College, Cambridge, 1915–1925, and writer
- Harry Levy-Lawson, 1st Viscount Burnham (1862–1933), Managing Proprietor, The Daily Telegraph, 1903–1928, and politician
- Field Marshal Julian Byng, 1st Viscount Byng of Vimy (1862–1935), General Officer Commanding Egypt, 1912–1914, Cavalry Corps, 1915, IX Corps, 1915–1916, XVII Corps, 1916, Canadian Corps, 1916–1917, and Third Army, 1917–1919, Governor General of Canada, 1921–1926, and Commissioner of Police of the Metropolis, 1928–1931
- M. R. James (1862–1936), author, antiquary, Director, Fitzwilliam Museum, University of Cambridge, 1894–1908, Vice-Chancellor, University of Cambridge, 1913–1915, and Provost of Eton, 1918–1936
- William Bromley-Davenport (1862–1949), MP, soldier, England footballer 1884, and Provost of Eton, 1918–1936
- Sir William Rees-Davies (1863–1939), Chief Justice of Hong Kong
- Arthur Studd (1863–1919), cricketer, artist and art collector – one of the Studd brothers
- Arthur Bourchier (1864–1927), actor-manager
- Fiennes Cornwallis, 1st Baron Cornwallis (1864–1935), politician
- Brigadier-General George Colborne Nugent (1864–1915), Second Boer War, Killed in World War I
- Ralph Pemberton (1864–1931), cricketer
- Walter Seton (1864–1912), barrister, cricketer and soldier
- Brigadier-General Charles FitzClarence (1865–1914), Second Boer War Victoria Cross, killed in World War I
- Evelyn Metcalfe (1865–1951), cricketer
- George Murray (1865–1939), Heath Professor of Comparative Pathology, University of Durham, 1893–1908, and Professor of Systematic Medicine, Victoria University of Manchester, 1908–1925
- Sidney James Agar, 4th Earl of Normanton (1865–1933)
- John Douglas-Scott-Montagu, 2nd Baron Montagu of Beaulieu (1866–1929), automobile enthusiast and expert
- Guy Nickalls (1866–1935), Olympic oarsman
- Charles Bathurst, 1st Viscount Bledisloe (1867–1958), Governor-General of New Zealand, 1930–1935, politician and agriculturist
- Algernon Burnaby (1868–1938), landowner, soldier, and Master of the Quorn Hunt
- The Hon. Henry Coventry (1868–1934), cricketer
- Sir George Herbert Duckworth (1868–1934), public servant
- Willie Llewelyn (1868–1893), cricketer
- Lord Henry Scott (1868–1945), cricketer, British Army soldier and deputy-governor of the Bank of Scotland
- George Thesiger (1868–1915), General killed in action at the battle of Loos
- Victor Christian William Cavendish, 9th Duke of Devonshire (1868–1938), Governor General of Canada 1916–1921.
- Oliver Russell, 2nd Baron Ampthill (1869–1935), diplomat
- Godfrey Foljambe (1869–1942), cricketer

== 1870s ==
- Brigadier-General Charles Strathavon Heathcote-Drummond-Willoughby (1870–1949), soldier
- Montague MacLean (1870–1951), cricketer
- John Dawson (1871–1948), cricketer
- Major-General Sir John Gough (1871–1915), Somaliland Campaign Victoria Cross
- Montagu Norman, 1st Baron Norman (1871–1950), Governor, Bank of England, 1920–1944
- Sir Home Gordon (1871–1956), 12th Baronet Gordon of Embo, Sutherland, cricket writer and journalist
- Harold Basil Christian (1871–1950), South African/Rhodesian farmer, botanist, horticulturist focusing on aloe and cycad
- Arthur Hoare (1871–1941), cricketer and clergyman
- Richard Jones (1871–1940), cricketer
- Alexander Murray, 8th Earl of Dunmore (1872–1962), Malakand Campaign Victoria Cross
- Algernon Temple-Gore-Langton, 5th Earl Temple of Stowe (1871–1940)
- Douglas Hogg, 1st Viscount Hailsham (1872–1950), Attorney General, 1922–1924, 1924–1928, Lord Chancellor, 1928–1929, 1935–1938, and Secretary of State for War, 1931–1935
- Brigadier General Alexander Hore-Ruthven, 1st Earl of Gowrie (1872–1955), Governor of South Australia, 1928–1934, and New South Wales, 1935–1936, Governor-General of Australia, 1936–1944, and Sudan Campaign Victoria Cross
- Frederick Roberts (1872–1899), Boer War Victoria Cross
- Sir Charles Ross, 9th Baronet (1872–1942), inventor of the Ross Rifle
- Maurice Baring (1874–1945), poet, writer and journalist
- Major-General Alexander Cambridge, 1st Earl of Athlone (1874–1957), Governor-General of South Africa, 1923–1931, and Canada, 1940–1946
- Sir George Russell Clerk (1874–1951), British Ambassador to France, 1934–1937
- Geoffrey Dawson (1874–1944), Editor, The Times, 1912–1919, 1923–1941
- Richard Hely-Hutchinson, 6th Earl of Donoughmore (1875–1948), Chairman of Committees, House of Lords, 1911–1931
- Robert Strutt, 4th Baron Rayleigh (1875–1947), Professor of Physics, Imperial College, London, 1908–1919
- Arthur Stanley, 5th Baron Stanley of Alderley (1875–1931), MP for Eddisbury, 1906–1910, Governor of Victoria, 1914–1920, and Chairman of the Royal Colonial Institute, 1925–1928
- Sir Trevor Bigham (1876–1954), Assistant Commissioner of Police of the Metropolis, 1914–1931, and Deputy Commissioner of Police of the Metropolis, 1931–1935
- Charles Burnell (1876–1969), oarsman
- Brigadier-General John Campbell (1876–1944), First World War Victoria Cross
- Bernard Darwin (1876–1961), golfer and sportswriter
- Edward Dent (1876–1957), Professor of Music, University of Cambridge, 1926–1941, and musicologist
- Arnold Ward (1876–1950) journalist, solicitor, MP
- Arthur Hollins (1876–1938), cricketer and chairman of Preston North End F.C.
- HRH Prince Aga Khan III (1877–1957), 48th Imam of the Shia Ismaili Muslims
- Bernard Bosanquet (1877–1936), cricketer
- Sir Desmond MacCarthy (1877–1952), literary critic and writer
- Roger Quilter (1877–1953), composer
- Charles Rolls (1877–1910), managing director, Rolls-Royce, 1906–1910, engineer, aviator, cyclist, racing driver, land speed record holder and first British air accident fatality
- Hubert Carr-Gomm (1877–1939), Liberal MP for Rotherhithe, 1906–18 and assistant secretary to Henry Campbell-Bannerman
- George Villiers, 6th Earl of Clarendon (1877–1955), chairman, BBC, 1927–1930, Governor-General of South Africa, 1931–1937, and Lord Chamberlain, 1938–1952
- Edward Plunkett, 18th Baron Dunsany (1878–1957), writer
- Henry McLaren, 2nd Baron Aberconway (1879–1953), industrialist, horticulturalist and politician
- Waldorf Astor, 2nd Viscount Astor (1879–1952), Proprietor, The Observer, 1911–1945, Lord Mayor of Plymouth, 1939–1944, and politician
- Douglas Clifton Brown, 1st Viscount Ruffside (1879–1958), Speaker of the House of Commons, 1943–1951
- Sir Gerald Kelly (1879–1972), portrait painter and President of the Royal Academy, 1949–1954
- George Lloyd, 1st Baron Lloyd (1879–1941), Governor of Bombay, 1918–1923, High Commissioner for Egypt and the Sudan, 1925–1929, and Colonial Secretary, 1940–1941
- Sir Charles Pym, Chairman of Kent County Council

== 1880s ==
- George Boyd-Rochfort (1880–1940), First World War Victoria Cross
- Henry James Bruce (1880–1951), diplomat and author
- Francis Grenfell (1880–1915), First World War Victoria Cross
- Lawrence Oates (1880–1912), Antarctic explorer
- Walter Guinness, 1st Baron Moyne (1880–1944), politician, Minister of State in the Middle East, assassinated in Cairo
- Oliver Locker-Lampson (1880–1954), MP
- Edward Ede (1881–1936), cricketer
- Lewis Evans (1881–1962), Victoria Cross recipient
- Frederick Septimus Kelly (1881–1916), composer
- Lewis John Mason Grant (1881- 1975), painter
- Sir Albert Napier (1881–1973), Permanent Secretary to the Lord Chancellor's Office
- William Payne-Gallwey (1881–1914), cricketer
- Eustachy, Prince Sapieha (1881–1963), Polish Foreign Secretary
- Robert Vansittart, 1st Baron Vansittart (1881–1957), divil servant and diplomat
- Henry Maitland Wilson, 1st Baron Wilson (1881–1964), Field Marshal, and Supreme Allied Commander in the Mediterranean, January-December 1944
- Edward Wood, 1st Earl of Halifax (1881–1959), Viceroy of India, 1926-1931, and Foreign Secretary, 1938-1940
- Ludovic Heathcoat-Amory (1881–1918), cricketer and soldier
- John Christie (1882–1962), founder of the Glyndebourne Festival Opera and Military Cross recipient.
- Harry Primrose, 6th Earl of Rosebery (1882–1974), politician
- Christopher Stone (1882–1965), early BBC disc jockey
- Prince Arthur of Connaught (1883–1938), Governor-General of South Africa, 1920-1924
- Arthur Borton (1883–1933), Victoria Cross recipient
- John Maynard Keynes (1883–1946), economist, 1st Baron Keynes
- George Lyttelton (1883–1962), teacher and letter-writer
- Gerald Hugh Tyrwhitt-Wilson, 14th Baron Berners (1883–1950), composer and novelist
- Charles Edward, Duke of Albany (1884–1954), Duke of Saxe-Coburg and Gotha (1900–1918), President of the German Red Cross, 1933–1945
- Alexander Cadogan (1884–1968), diplomat and civil servant, Permanent Under-Secretary for Foreign Affairs, 1938-1946
- Alfred Dillwyn Knox (1884–1943), classics scholar, papyrologist and World War 2 code-breaker at Bletchley Park
- John Murray (1884–1967)
- George Butterworth (1885–1916), composer and Military Cross recipient
- Shane Leslie (1885–1971), Anglo-Irish diplomat and writer
- Sir Horace James Seymour (1885–1978), diplomat
- John Jacob Astor, 1st Baron Astor of Hever (1886–1971), Anglo-American newspaper proprietor, politician
- Arthur Anderson (1886–1967), Olympic athlete
- Geoffrey Drummond (1886–1941), Victoria Cross recipient
- Henry Dunell (1886–1950), cricketer
- Myles Kenyon (1886–1960), cricketer
- Sir Albert Charles Gladstone, 5th Baronet, of Fasque (1886–1967), Olympic gold medal-winner
- Hugh Dalton (1887–1962), politician and Chancellor of the Exchequer, 1945-1947
- Denys Finch Hatton (1887–1931), big game hunter
- Julian Huxley (1887–1975), evolutionary biologist
- Henry Moseley (1887–1915), physicist of atomic numbers
- Julian Grenfell (1888–1915), war poet
- Sir Charles Andrew Gladstone, 6th Baronet, of Fasque (1888–1968), schoolmaster
- Ronald Knox (1888–1957), theologian, Catholic convert and Bible translator
- Thomas Ralph Merton (1888–1969), physicist and MI6 scientist
- Patrick Shaw-Stewart (1888–1917), war poet
- Neville Elliott-Cooper (1889–1918), Victoria Cross recipient
- Eugen Millington-Drake (1889–1972), diplomat
- Walter Styles (1889–1965), soldier and Member of Parliament

== 1890s ==
- Philip Bainbrigge (1890–1918), writer
- Alfred "Duff" Cooper, 1st Viscount Norwich (1890–1954), Secretary of State for War, 1935-1937, and First Lord of the Admiralty, 1937-1938
- Percy Hansen (1890–1951), Victoria Cross recipient
- Archie Sinclair, 1st Viscount Thurso (1890–1970), leader of the Liberal Party, 1935-1945
- Edmond Foljambe (1890–1960), first-class cricketer
- Stewart Menzies (1890–1968), head of MI6 during World War II
- Archer Windsor-Clive (1890–1914), the first first-class cricketer to be killed during World War I
- Anthony Muirhead (1890–1939), Member of Parliament (MP) for Wells in Somerset 1929–1939
- Arthur Batten-Pooll (1891–1971), First World War soldier who was awarded the Victoria Cross
- William Congreve (1891–1916), First World War soldier, Victoria Cross
- Walter D'Arcy Hall (1891–1980), soldier, Member of Parliament
- Edward Stephenson (1891–1969), cricketer and soldier
- William Boswell (1892–1916), cricketer
- Edward Bridges, 1st Baron Bridges (1892–1969), Cabinet Secretary, 1938–1945, and Permanent Secretary to the Treasury, 1945–1956
- Wykeham Cornwallis, 2nd Baron Cornwallis (1892–1982)
- Sir Reginald Graham (1892–1980), First World War Victoria Cross
- J. B. S. Haldane (1892–1964), Professor of Genetics and of Biometry, University College London, 1933–1957
- Ewart Horsfall (1892–1974), oarsman who competed in the 1912 and 1920 Summer Olympics
- Sir Osbert Sitwell (1892–1969), writer
- George Llewelyn Davies (1893–1915), along with his four younger brothers the inspiration for playwright J. M. Barrie's characters of Peter Pan and the Lost Boys, killed in action in the Second Battle of Ypres, Belgium, 15 March 1915
- General Sir Frank Messervy (1893–1974), British Indian Army officer in the First and Second World Wars. First Commander-in-Chief of the Pakistan Army following independence
- HM King Prajadhipok of Siam (1893–1941), King of Siam, 1925–1935
- Oliver Lyttelton, 1st Viscount Chandos (1893–1972), Colonial Secretary, 1951–1954
- William Forbes-Sempill, 19th Lord Sempill (1893–1965), naval aviator and traitor
- Brigadier Sir Richard Gambier-Parry, KCMG (1894–1965), head of Section VIII of the Secret Intelligence Service, Director of Communications Hanslope Park, Operation Tracer
- Aldous Huxley (1894–1963), novelist
- General Sir Oliver Leese (1894–1978), General Officer Commanding XXX Corps, 1942–1943, GOC Eighth Army, 1943–1944, Commander-in-Chief, Allied Land Forces, South-East Asia, 1944–1945, and General Officer Commanding-in-Chief Eastern Command, 1945–1946
- Harold Macmillan, 1st Earl of Stockton (1894–1986), Chancellor of the Exchequer, 1955–1957, and Prime Minister, 1957–1963
- Peter Warlock (1894–1930), composer and writer on music
- Thomas Corbett, 2nd Baron Rowallan (1895–1977), Chief Scout of the Commonwealth, 1945–1959, and Governor of Tasmania, 1959–1963
- Terence Gray (Wei Wu Wei) (1895–1987), theatrical producer, author
- Geoffrey Madan (1895–1947), aphorist
- Colonel George Edward Younghusband CBE (1896–1970), soldier serving in WWI and WWII, POW Italy, Vincigliata,
- Sir Frederick "Boy" Browning (1896–1965), General Officer Commanding I Airborne Corps, 1943–1944
- John Dunville (1896–1917), First World War Victoria Cross
- Tim Massy-Beresford (1896–1987), British Army officer
- Sir Henry Segrave (1896–1930), engineer, racing driver, aviator and holder of land speed record
- Anthony Eden, 1st Earl of Avon (1897–1977), Secretary of State for Foreign Affairs, 1935–1938, 1940–1945, 1951–1955, and Prime Minister, 1955–1957
- Arthur Rhys Davids (1897–1917). Royal Flying Corps Distinguished Service Order, Military Cross First World War.
- Julian Royds Gribble (1897–1918), First World War Victoria Cross
- Peter Llewelyn Davies (1897–1960), awarded the Military Cross for service during World War I; in 1926 founded the publishing house Peter Davies Ltd.
- Francis Manners, 4th Baron Manners (1897–1972)
- Sir Sacheverell Sitwell (1897–1988)
- General Sir Richard McCreery (1898–1967), General Officer Commanding Eighth Army, Northern Italy, 1944–1945
- Colin Hercules Mackenzie (1898–1986), founder of Force 136
- Leo d'Erlanger (1898–1978), banker
- John Cobb (1899–1952), racing driver and holder of land speed record
- Christopher Hussey (1899–1970), architectural historian and writer
- Henry Gray Studholme Bt. (1899–1987), Conservative MP
- Thomas Brocklebank (1899–1953), Baronet and cricketer
- George Scott-Chad (1899–1950), cricketer

== See also ==
- List of Old Etonians born before the 18th century
- List of Old Etonians born in the 18th century
- List of Old Etonians born in the 20th century
