= Traill (surname) =

The surname Traill (also Trail, Traille, Traillie, Traily, etc.) Is derived from Norse to at least Norman via France (is not of French 'origin', 'origin' is the wrong word to use here, the first written records of it come from France via Normandy, its origin is Norse via Normandy at least), it does also seem to have some relation to words from the northern UK, pointing again to where it is derived from. It became "Traill" in Scotland (show any 'modern' non Scottish spread) and thence spread around the world.

The family is recorded in France from the 10th century, as Barons in Britain from the 11th century, as Lairds in Scotland from the 14th century and later in Orkney. In the 17th century they were prominent in Northern Ireland and also spread to various parts of the United States including the Cajun community. Other branches of the family settled in Argentina in the 19th century, and in the British Colonies.

== France ==
The name is French. Goidfrid de Traillie came to England and held land in Bedford and on the Scottish border, both under William the Conqueror. The Traills held land at Trelly in France and later in Bordeaux. Before 1391, Sir John Trailly was appointed Mayor of Bordeaux. Some Traills still reside in France.

The similarity to the name Tyrell raises the question whether the families are related, but the Tyrell family are descended from the family of the Count de Poix, of which the senior branch remained in France in the area known as Picardy. There is no known relationship between the two families in England: the Tyrells held land in the South in Devon and Somerset, unlike Goidfrid de Trailli (see above).

== Scotland ==
The family started to leave England for Scotland and France after the death of Sir John Treyl in 1360, although his son John did return for periods and served as a member of the House of Commons of England. A few years before this Sir John's death in 1401, his son Reginald returned from Bordeaux and had sold up the English estates by his own death in 1404. Earlier in approximately 1385, Sir John's brother, Walter Treyl, Bishop of St Andrews, bought Blebo from the Church and later willed it to his nephew, Thomas.

William Dunbar in his Lament for the Makaris writes "He hes Blind Harry and Sandy Traill / Slaine with his schour of mortall haill / Whilk Patrik Johnestoun myght nocht fle", citing him among a roll call of poets chiefly from the fifteenth century, but nothing else is known of Sandy Traill and no works have been traced.

Robert Traill of Greyfriars was born in 1603. He was son of Colonel James Traill, of Killcleary, Ireland, Gentleman of the Privy Chamber to Henry, Prince of Wales, and grandson of the Laird of Blebo, and Matilda Melvill of Carnbee. He graduated with an M.A. from St Andrews on 21 July 1621. He later studied at the Protestant College of Saumur. He was an English tutor in France to the sister of the Duke of Rohan in 1628.

Blebo, a large rural property, was subdivided in 1609 by the Laird of the period, John Traill, in agreement with his eldest son in order to help his younger brother Thomas. The smaller portion became known as Blebo Hole. In the 16th century another brother of the same family, George Traill, migrated to Orkney, Scotland and thence to County Antrim, Ireland, now Northern Ireland.

In 1722, lead and silver were discovered on the Blebo property. The area around the estate (Blebo Hole) is currently known as the community of Blebo Craigs. In Central Fife, Blebo lies three miles (five km) east of Cupar and comprises the village of Blebo Craigs, located a quarter-mile (0.4 km) northeast of Blebo House, together with the farms of Milton of Blebo, Blebo Mains, and Newbigging of Blebo. Kemback lies a quarter-mile (0.4 km) to the northwest and Pitscottie a half-mile (0.8 km) to the southwest.

A group of Trails came from Birsay on Orkney including Samuel Trail and his son James W. H. Trail. Thomas Stewart Traill was from Kirkwall.

== Ireland ==
In the 18th/19th century the Reverend Anthony Traill (1745–1852) was Rector of Skull and Archdeacon of the Diocese of Connor.

His son, the Reverend Robert Traill (1793–1847) was also Rector of Skull during the Great Famine and tried to alleviate the lot of the poor and to draw attention to their plight. He was also the first Irish translator of The Jewish War of Flavius Josephus. His story was featured on TV in Victoria Series 2 Episode 6, which dealt with the impact on the Queen of the Famine, her correspondence and meeting with the Reverend.

In 1904 Anthony Traill (1838–1914) was appointed provost (i.e. head) of Trinity College, Dublin.

William Atcheson Traill (1844–1933) was an Irish engineer and co-founder of the Giant's Causeway Railway and Tramway Company, opened in 1887.

== United States ==
In the mid 17th century, Trails acquired and settled land in the North America, in Massachusetts and in Maryland. The Maryland area, New Scotland Hundred, eventually became the city of Washington DC. The Maryland Trails also held estates in what are now Montgomery County and Frederick County. The name also spread to Louisiana, Alabama, and other parts of the southern United States. The name "Traille" is recorded in the Cajun community in the southern United States.

== Later dispersion ==
In the 19th century the sons of Robert Traill settled in Argentina, where his grandson Johnny Traill became the first Irish-Argentine 10-goal polo player. Other branches of the family settled in Australia, Canada and New Zealand.

== In literature ==
The book Silver River by Daisy Goodwin gives a partly fictionalised account of the fortunes of her branch of the Traill family from her great-great-great-grandfather, Rector Robert Traill of Skull during the Great Famine of Ireland via their emigration to Argentina to herself in an attempt to understand her relationship with her mother, Jocasta Innes.

== People with the surname Traill ==
- Anthony Traill (college provost) (1838–1914), provost of Trinity College Dublin
- Anthony Traill (linguist) (1939–2007), South African linguist
- Anthony Traill (priest) (1755–1831), rector of Skull and Archdeacon of Connor
- Barry Traill (fl. 2000s), Australian zoologist and conservationist
- Catharine Parr Traill (1802–1899), English-Canadian author and naturalist
- Elsie Traill (1876–1946), Australian philanthropist
- Eric Sinclair Traill (1905–1981), British publisher and jazz critic
- George Traill (1787–1871), Scottish politician
- Henry Duff Traill (1842–1900), British author and journalist
- James Traill (disambiguation), several people
  - James Traill (bishop), Anglican bishop
  - James Traill (cricketer), English cricketer and barrister
  - James Hamilton Traill, Australian flying ace
- Jessie Traill (1881–1967), Australian print maker
- John Traill (1835–1897), Scottish coffee house owner
- Johnny Traill (1882–1958), Irish-Argentine polo player
- John Christie (headmaster) (1899–1980), British teacher
- Ken Traill (1926–2002), English Rugby League footballer
- Peter Traill, pen name of Guy Mainwaring Morton (1896–1968)
- Phil Traill (born 1973), British television and film director
- Robert Traill (Irish clergyman) (1793-1847)
- Robert Traill of Greyfriars (1603–1678), Scottish minister
- Robert Traill (Scottish minister) (1642–1716), his son
- Roy Traill (Robert Henry Traill, 1892–1989), New Zealand wildlife ranger
- Sinclair Traill (1905–1981), British publisher and music critic
- Stewart Traill (1936–2018), American religious leader
- Thomas Traill (1899–1973), Argentine-born British World War I flying ace
- Thomas Stewart Traill (1781–1862), Scottish physician and scholar
- William Atcheson Traill (1844–1933), Irish engineer
- William Henry Traill (1842–1902), Australian journalist and politician
- William Traill (1838–1905), English cricketer

== See also ==
- Trail (disambiguation)
- Traill (disambiguation)
