= Lament for the Makaris =

Poem composed c. 1505 by William Dunbar

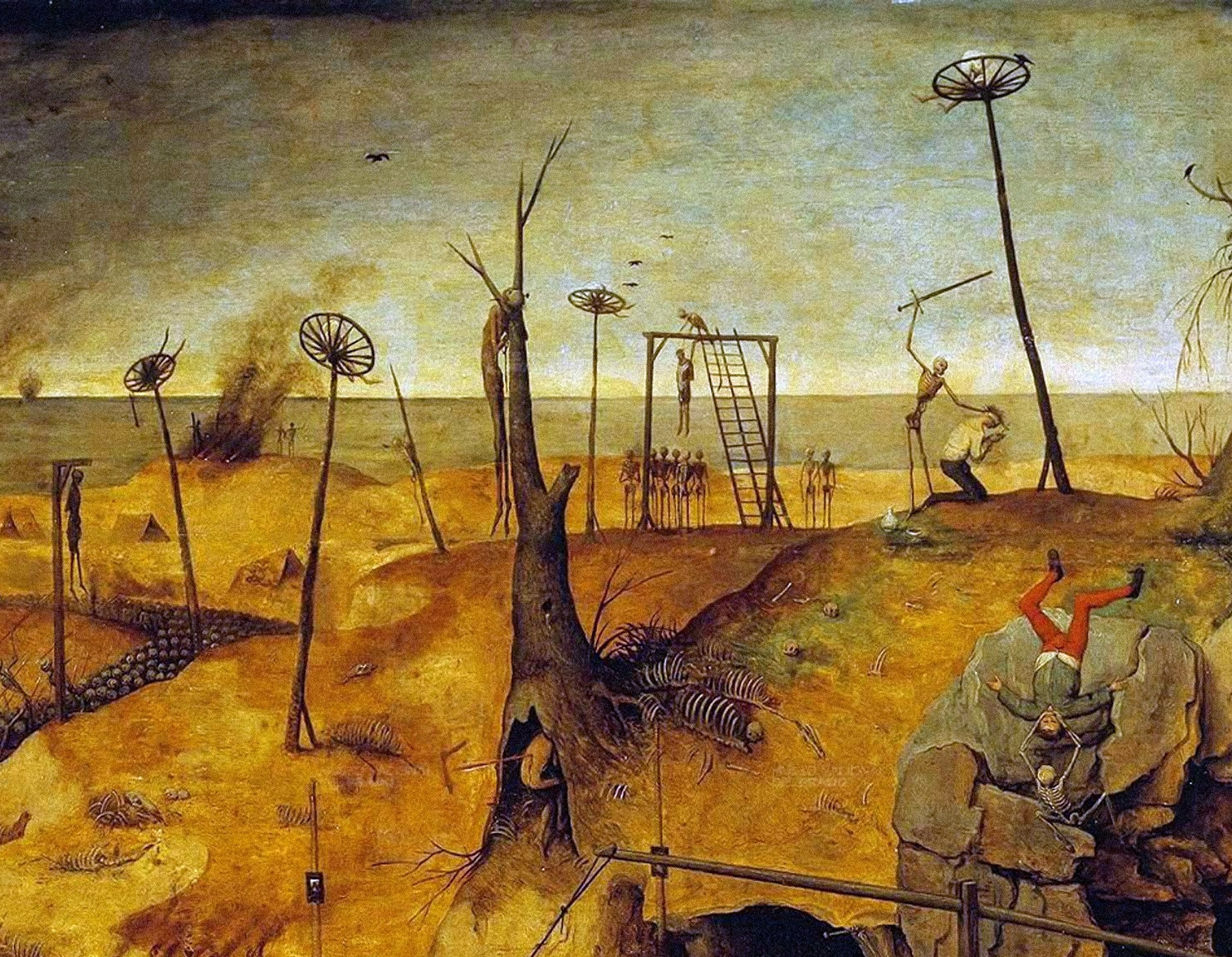
Breughel, The Triumph of Death (detail)

"I that in Heill wes and Gladnes", also known as "The Lament for the Makaris", is a poem in the form of a danse macabre by the Scottish poet William Dunbar. Every fourth line repeats the Latin refrain timor mortis conturbat me (fear of death troubles me), a litanic phrase from the Office of the Dead.

Apart from its literary quality, the poem is notable for the list of makars it contains, some of whom are historically attestable as poets only from Dunbar's testimony in this work. After listing Lydgate, Gower and Chaucer, the makars invoked are Scottish. All but two are cited as having died by the time of the composition. The two exceptions are the courtier Patrick Johnston and known poet Walter Kennedy, the latter of whom died c. 1508. From internal evidence, the lament is generally thought to have been composed c. 1505.

Most of the names can be traced to either the fourteenth or fifteenth centuries.

== List of names in the Lament ==
The list of names in the Lament for the Makaris, all of which are from what Dunbar in the poem calls his "facultie", suggests a picture of the Scottish literary culture of the period which is wider than that otherwise handed down to us from the surviving record. In order and form of citation, the makars that Dunbar mourns in 'The Lament' are:

- Chaucer (died 1400)
- The Monk of Bery — John Lydgate (died 1451)
- Gower (died 1408)
- Syr Hew of Eglintoun — historical figure (died 1377), brother-in-law to Robert II; association with the poet Huchoun posited but not certain
- Heryot — not identified, no known works
- Wyntoun — Andrew of Wyntoun (died 1425), author of the Orygynale Cronykil of Scotland
- Maister Johne Clerk — not identified; the name occurs in the Bannatyne MS; the title maister signifies university education
- Jame(s) Afflek — (James or Jamie Auchinleck)?, no known works; Dunbar's text might imply Afflek, and Clerk before him (mentioned in the same line), were noted for serious themes ("ballad" and "tragedy")
- Holland — Richard Holland (died c. 1483), author of the Buke of the Howlat
- Barbour — John Barbour (died 1395), author of The Brus
- Schir Mungo Lokert of the Le — no known works; posited identification with historical knight (died 1489)
- Clerk of Tranent — not identified; described by Dunbar as the author of a (lost?) Anteris of Gawane, a title also attributed to Huchoun by Andrew of Wyntoun
- Schir Gilbert Hay (died after 1456) — author of the Buik of King Alexander the Conquerour, a copy of which is dated 1499
- Blind Hary (died 1492) — author of The Wallace
- Sandy Traill — not identified (see also Trail family)
- Patrik Johnestoun — Scottish courtier, no known works; the citation implies Johnston, who probably staged entertainments for the royal court in Dunbar's day, was still living at the time
- Merseir — not identified; Dunbar praises him for 'quickness', 'terseness' and 'elevation'; some love poems extant in the Bannatyne MS are attributed to a Mersar
- Roull of Aberdene
- Roull of Corstorphin — one surviving poem accredited to a Roull, (Roull = Scots form of the French name, Rolf)
- Maister Robert Henrisoun (d. c. 1500) — one of Scotland's most important poets; works include the Testament of Cresseid and Morall Fabillis
- Schir Johne the Ros — no known works; he was Dunbar's commissar in the Flyting of Dunbar and Kennedy
- Stobo — no known works; he is identified with John Reid, priest in Kirkcudbright, who served as clerk and notary in royal courts of James II, III and IV
- Quintyne Schaw — Kennedy's commissar in the Flyting; one satire extant (see also Clan Shaw of Tordarroch)
- Gud maister Walter Kennedy (d. c. 1508) — surviving works by Kennedy include The Passioun of Crist and his part in the Flyting

Dunbar offers some small tantalising details beyond customary compliments for the lost poets cited. The title of one poem is given: Clerk of Tranent's "Anteris of Gawane", an otherwise unknown work. Of Mercer, Dunbar extends his critical opinion to say that he "did in luf so lifly write,/ So schort, so quyk, of sentence hie", and the reference to him as a poet of love also accords with the fact that some love poems are attributed to a "Mersar" in the Bannatyne MS. Finally, if the lines "That scorpion fell hes done infek,/ Maister Johne Clerk, and James Afflek,/ Fra balat making and tragidie" can be taken to impart literal information, then it might infer that some particular reputation for work with more serious themes attached to these names. At that time in Scotland "tragedy" denoted any "story, play or poem with a disastrous or sorrowful outcome".

== Extract ==
On to the ded gois all estatis,
Princis, prelotis, and potestatis,
Baith riche and pur of al degre;
Timor mortis conturbat me.

He takis the knychtis in to feild,
Anarmit under helme and scheild;
Victour he is at all mellie;
Timor mortis conturbat me.

(Lament for the Makaris, Lines 17-24)
