= James Traill =

James Traill may refer to:

- James Traill (bishop), Anglican bishop
- James Hamilton Traill, Australian flying ace
- James Traill (cricketer), English cricketer and barrister
- James Traill (botanist) (died 1853)

== See also ==
- James Trail, British lawyer and politician
- James W. H. Trail, Scottish botanist
