= South Africa national cricket team record by opponent =

The South Africa men's national cricket team, also known as the Proteas, represents South Africa in men's international cricket and is administered by Cricket South Africa. South Africa is a full member of the International Cricket Council with Test and One Day International (ODI) status. They first competed in international cricket in 1889, when they played against England in a Test match; England won the match by 8 wickets. captained by Owen Robert Dunell. They recorded their first Test win against England in 1906, which took them 17 years at Old Wanderers, Johannesburg. As of February 20, 2026, South Africa have played 479 Test matches; they have won 191 matches, lost 162 matches, and 126 matches were drawn. South Africa won the 2023–2025 World Test Championship defeating Australia in the final. South Africa played their first ODI match against India in 1991, and registered their first win against India in the same series. As of 20 February 2026, South Africa have played 698 ODI matches, winning 421 matches and losing 250; 6 matches were tied and 21 matches had no result. Their most noted international win was their win in the inaugural Champions Trophy in 1998. The team also won Commonwealth Games Gold medal in 1998. South Africa played their first Twenty20 International (T20I) against New Zealand in 2005, losing the match by five wickets, As of 18 February 2026, they have played 221 T20I matches and won 119 of them; 97 were lost, with 1 super-over win (after being tied) and 3 having no result.

South Africa have faced 9 teams in Test cricket, with their most frequent opponent being England, against whom they have played 156 matches. South Africa have registered more wins against England than against any other team, with 35. In ODI matches, South Africa have played against 16 teams. They have played against Australia more frequently in ODI matches, with a winning percentage of 52.31 in 57 out of 113 matches. The team have played 15 countries in T20Is, and have played 31 matches with India. They also have recorded the most victories against England defeating them in fourteen matches.

== Key ==
Key for the tables
Symbol	Meaning
Matches	Number of matches played
Won	Number of matches won
Lost	Number of matches lost
Tied	Number of matches tied
Draw	Number of matches ended in a draw
No Result	Number of matches ended with no result
Tie+Win	Number of matches tied and then won in a tiebreaker such as a bowl-out or Super Over
Tie+Loss	Number of matches tied and then lost in a tiebreaker such as a bowl-out or Super Over
%Won	Percentage of games won to those played (Note: Games that did not have a result are not taken into consideration while calculating the result percentage. Ties are counted as half a win.)
W/L Ratio	Ratio of matches won to matches lost
First	Year of the first match played by India against the country
Last	Year of the last match played by India against the country

== Test Cricket ==
Opponent	Matches	Won	Lost	Draw	Tied	% Won	% Lost	% Drew
Australia	102	27	54	21	0	26.47	52.94	20.58
Bangladesh	16	14	0	2	0	87.50	0.00	12.50
England	156	35	66	55	0	22.43	42.30	35.25
India	46	20	16	10	0	43.47	34.78	21.73
New Zealand	49	26	7	16	0	53.06	14.28	34.04
Pakistan	32	18	7	7	0	56.25	21.87	21.87
Sri Lanka	33	18	9	6	0	54.54	27.27	18.18
West Indies	34	23	3	8	0	67.64	8.82	23.52
Zimbabwe	11	10	0	1	0	90.90	0.00	9.09
Statistics are correct as of South Africa v India at Assam Cricket Association Stadium, Guwahati, 2nd Test, 22–26 November 2025.

== One Day International ==
Opponent	Matches	Won	Lost	Tied	No Result	% Won	First	Last
Full Members
Afghanistan	6	4	2	0	0	66.66	2019	2025
Australia	113	57	52	3	1	52.31	1992	2026
Bangladesh	25	19	6	0	0	76.00	2002	2023
England	74	37	31	1	5	53.07	1992	2025
India	94	51	40	0	3	57.47	1991	2022
Ireland	11	8	2	0	1	72.72	2007	2021
New Zealand	74	42	27	0	5	56.75	1992	2025
Pakistan	87	52	34	0	1	59.77	1992	2025
Sri Lanka	81	46	33	1	1	58.12	1992	2023
West Indies	64	45	16	1	2	72.58	1992	2023
Zimbabwe	41	38	2	0	1	95.00	1992	2018
Associate Members
Canada	1	1	0	0	0	100.00	2003	2003
Kenya	10	10	0	0	0	100.00	1996	2008
Netherlands	8	6	1	0	1	75.00	1996	2023
Scotland	1	1	0	0	0	100.00	2007	2007
United Arab Emirates	2	2	0	0	0	100.00	1996	2015
Total	692	419	246	6	21	62.89	1991	2025
Statistics are correct as of 8 September 2025.

== Twenty20 International ==
Opponent	Matches	Won	Lost	Tied	No Result	% Won
Full Members
Afghanistan	3	3	0	0	0	100.00
Australia	28	9	19	0	0	32.14
Bangladesh	9	9	0	0	0	100.00
England	27	14	12	0	1	51.85
India	31	12	18	0	1	38.70
Ireland	7	6	1	0	0	85.71
New Zealand	18	11	7	0	0	61.11
Pakistan	24	12	12	0	0	50.00
Sri Lanka	18	12	5	1	0	66.66
West Indies	26	12	14	0	0	46.15
Zimbabwe	8	7	0	0	1	87.50
Associate Members
Nepal	1	1	0	0	0	100.00
Netherlands	3	2	1	0	0	66.66
Scotland	1	1	0	0	0	100.00
United States	1	1	0	0	0	100.00
Total	205	112	89	1	3	54.63
Statistics are correct as of England v South Africa at Sophia Gardens, 10 September 2025
