= Lionel Garnett =

Lionel Garnett may refer to:

- Lionel Garnett (bowls)
- Lionel Garnett (cricketer)
