= Charles Garnett =

Charles Garnett may refer to:

- Charles Garnett (cricketer) (1840–1919), English cricketer
- Charles Garnett, High Sheriff of Wiltshire
- Charles Garnett, character in Z Nation
