= Frederick Garnett =

English cricketer

Personal information
- Full name: Frederick William Garnett
- Born: 17 June 1817; Manchester, Lancashire, England
- Died: 4 April 1874 (aged 56); Tamworth, Staffordshire, England
- Batting: Unknown
- Relatives: Charles Garnett (nephew); Lionel Garnett (nephew)

Domestic team information
- Years: Team
- 1840: Oxford University

Career statistics
Competition	First-class
Matches	1
Runs scored	20
Batting average	10.00
100s/50s	–/–
Top score	10
Catches/stumpings	1/–
- Source: Cricinfo, 9 March 2020

Frederick William Garnett (17 June 1817 – 4 April 1874) was an English first-class cricketer.

The son of Robert Garnett, he was born at Manchester in June 1817. He was educated at Eton College, before matriculating at Balliol College, Oxford in 1836, graduating B.A. in 1840, M.A. in 1845. While studying at Oxford, he made a single appearance in first-class cricket for Oxford University against the Marylebone Cricket Club at Oxford in 1840. Batting twice in the match, Garnett was dismissed for 10 runs in both of Oxford's innings' by James Cobbett. He was a student of the Inner Temple, but did not become a practicing barrister. Garnett died unmarried at Bonehill House in Tamworth in April 1874. His nephews, Charles and Lionel, were both first-class cricketers.
