= International cricket in 1888–89 =

International cricket season

The 1888–89 international cricket season was from September 1888 to April 1889.

== Season overview ==
International tours
Start date	Home team	Away team	Results [Matches]			
Start date	Home team	Away team	Test	ODI	FC	LA
12 March 1889	South Africa	England	0–2 [2]	—	—	—

== March ==
=== England in South Africa ===
Test match series
No.	Date	Home captain	Away captain	Venue	Result
Test 31	12–13 March	Owen Dunell	Aubrey Smith	St George's Park Cricket Ground, Port Elizabeth	England by 8 wickets
Test 32	25–26 March	William Milton	Monty Bowden	Newlands Cricket Ground, Cape Town	England by an innings and 202 runs
