= John Thompson (cricketer, born 1870) =

English cricketer

Personal information
- Full name: John Charles Peace Thompson
- Born: 14 April 1870; Chester, Cheshire, England
- Died: 31 December 1945 (aged 75); Tarset, Northumberland, England
- Batting: Unknown
- Relatives: Lionel Garnett (brother-in-law)

Career statistics
Competition	First-class
Matches	1
Runs scored	14
Batting average	14.00
100s/50s	–/–
Top score	14
Balls bowled	–
Wickets	–
Bowling average	–
5 wickets in innings	–
10 wickets in match	–
Best bowling	–
Catches/stumpings	–/–
- Source: Cricinfo, 28 July 2013

John Charles Peace Thompson (14 April 1870 – 31 December 1945) was an English cricketer. Thompson's batting style is unknown. He was born at Chester, Cheshire.

Thompson made a single first-class appearance for Liverpool and District against Yorkshire in 1892 at Aigburth Cricket Ground, Liverpool. In a match which Liverpool and District won by 6 wickets, Thompson batted once, scoring 14 runs in Liverpool and District's first-innings before he was dismissed by Thomas Wardall.

He died at Tarset, Northumberland on 31 December 1945. His brother-in-law Lionel Garnett also played first-class cricket.
