= List of Old Etonians born before the 18th century =

The following notable old boys of Eton College were born in the 15th, 16th and 17th centuries.

== 15th century ==
- Thomas Rotherham (1423–1500), Keeper of the Privy Seal, 1467–1474, Bishop of Rochester, 1468–1472, Bishop of Lincoln, 1472–1480, Lord Chancellor, 1474–1483, and Archbishop of York, 1480–1500
- Oliver King (c.1432–1503), Bishop of Exeter, 1492–1495, and Bishop of Bath and Wells, 1495–1503
- John Doget (c.1434–1501), humanist scholar
- Robert Wydow (c.1446–1505), poet and church musician
- Walter Lambe (c.1450-c.1504), composer and church musician
- John Browne (1453-c.1500) composer
- Robert Hacomblen (c.1455-1528) classical scholar and composer, Provost of King's College, Cambridge
- John Barker (fl. c.1471–1482), logician
- Nicholas West (c.1461–1533), Bishop of Ely, 1535–1538, and diplomat
- John Kite (died 1537), Archbishop of Armagh, 1513–1521, and Bishop of Carlisle, 1521–1537
- Richard Croke (or Crocus) (c.1489–1558), classical scholar
- Edward Fox (c.1496–1538), Bishop of Hereford, 1535–1538

== 16th century ==
- John Frith (1503–1533), Protestant clergyman and martyr
- Sir Thomas Pope (1507–1558), founder of Trinity College, Oxford
- Edward Aglionby (1520–c.1587), poet
- Thomas Tusser (1524–1580), poet and farmer
- Robert Glover (died 1555), Protestant martyr
- Laurence Saunders (died 1555), Protestant preacher and martyr
- Sir Thomas Sutton (c.1532–1611), founder of Charterhouse School
- Sir Humphrey Gilbert (c.1539–1583), coloniser of Newfoundland
- Ralph Sherwin (1550–1581), Jesuit priest, martyr and Catholic saint
- Thomas Aufield (1552–1585), Roman Catholic priest and beatified martyr
- John Cowell (1554–1611), Regius Professor of Civil Law, University of Cambridge, 1594–1611
- Sir John Harington (1561–1612), author and inventor of the water closet
- Sir Thomas Posthumous Hoby (1566–1640), Member of Parliament, claimed as the inspiration for Malvolio in Twelfth Night.
- William Oughtred (1575–1660), mathematician
- Robert Devereux, 3rd Earl of Essex (1591–1646), General, Parliamentarian Army, 1642–1645
- Méric Casaubon (1599–1671), classical scholar

== 17th century ==
- Henry Hammond (1605–1660), clergyman
- Bulstrode Whitelocke (1605–1675), lawyer and politician, prominent Parliamentarian during the Civil War
- Edmund Waller (1606–1687), poet and anti-Parliamentarian conspirator
- John Pearson (1613–1686), Lady Margaret's Professor of Divinity, University of Cambridge, 1661–1672, and Bishop of Chester, 1673–1686
- Henry More (1614–1687), theologian and philosopher
- George Fane (c.1616–1663), Royalist commander
- Antony Ascham (died 1650), Parliamentarian Ambassador to Spain, 1650, and murder victim
- Robert Boyle (1627–1691), natural philosopher and chemist
- Henry Godolphin (1648–1733), Provost of Eton, 1695–1707, 1726–1733, and Dean of St Paul's, 1707–1726
- George Stanhope (1660–1728), Dean of Canterbury, 1704–1728
- John Rosewell Headmaster (1671–1682)
- James Stanhope, 1st Earl Stanhope (1673–1721), Secretary of State for the Southern Department, 1714–1717, 1718–1721, Chancellor of the Exchequer, 1717–1718, and soldier
- Charles Townshend, 2nd Viscount Townshend (1674–1738), Secretary of State for the Northern Department, 1714–1717, 1721–1730
- Anthony Collins (1676–1729), deist
- Robert Walpole, 1st Earl of Orford (1676–1745), Secretary at War, 1708–1710, Prime Minister and Chancellor of the Exchequer, 1721–1742
- John Weldon (1676–1736), organist and composer
- Henry St John, 1st Viscount Bolingbroke (1678–1751), Secretary at War, 1704–1708
- Charles Talbot, 1st Baron Talbot of Hensol (1685–1737), Solicitor General, 1726–1733, and Lord Chancellor, 1733–1737
- Sir William Wyndham (1687–1740), Secretary at War, 1712–1713, and Chancellor of the Exchequer, 1713–1714
- Thomas Thackeray, 1693–1760, an 18th-century Head Master of Harrow
- William George (c.1698 – 1756) Dean of Lincoln, Provost of King's College, Cambridge, Head Master of Eton

== See also ==
- List of Old Etonians born in the 18th century
- List of Old Etonians born in the 19th century
- List of Old Etonians born in the 20th century
