= Herriott =

Herriott is a surname. Notable people with the surname include:

- John Herriott (1844–1918), Lieutenant Governor of Iowa 1902–1907
- Maurice Herriott (born 1939), British athlete
- Elizabeth Herriott (1882–1936), New Zealand botanist and university teacher

== See also ==
- Heriot (disambiguation)
- Herriot
