= Timor mortis conturbat me =

Late medieval latin phrase

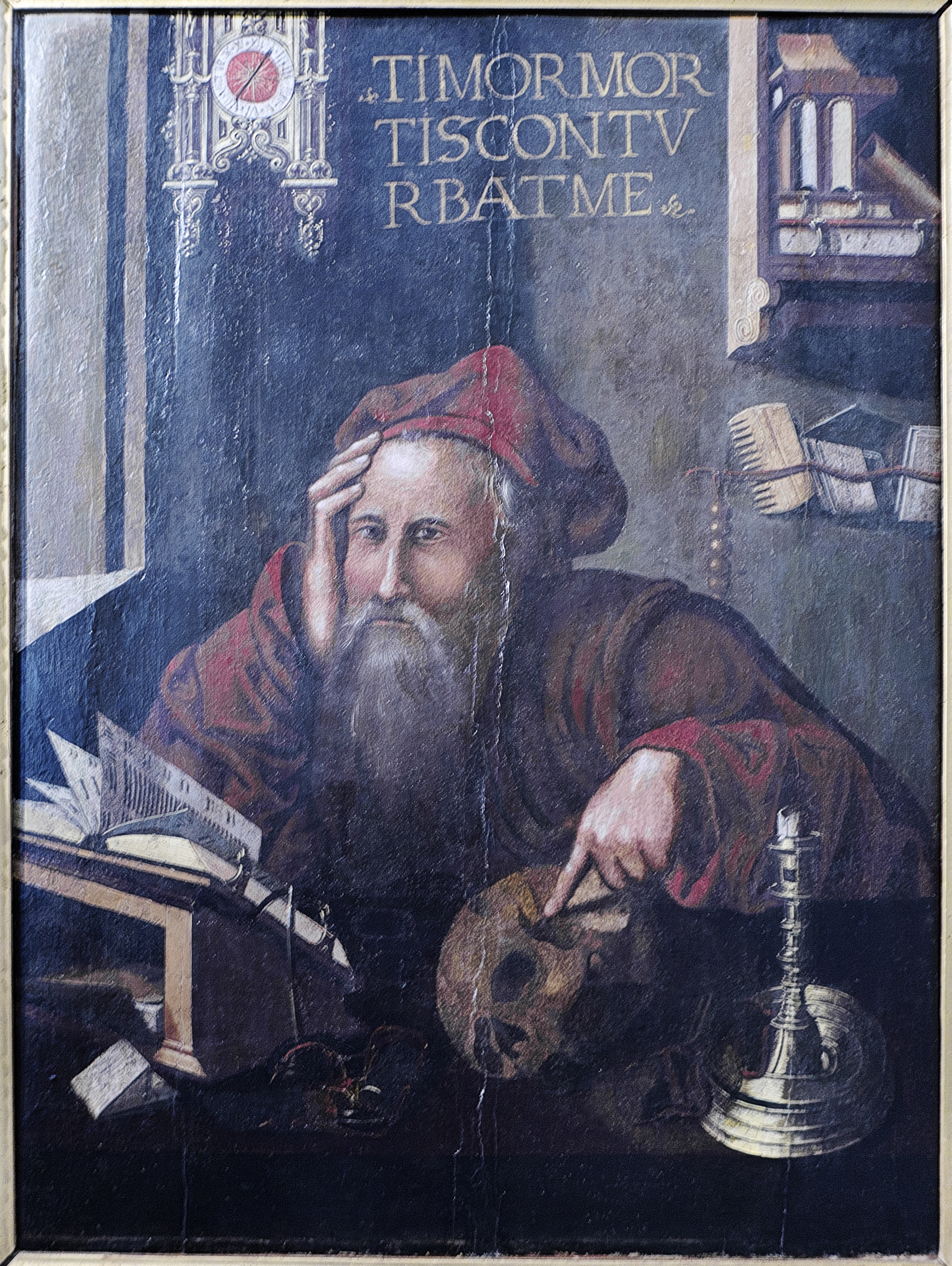
16th-century portrait of Saint Jerome in his study, with Timor mortis conturbat me behind him. (after Marinus van Reymerswaele)

Timor mortis conturbat me is a Latin phrase commonly found in late medieval Scottish and English poetry, translating to "fear of death disturbs me". The phrase comes from a responsory of the Catholic Office of the Dead, in the third Nocturn of Matins:

Latin

Peccantem me quotidie, et non poenitentem, timor mortis conturbat me. Quia in inferno nulla est redemptio, miserere mei, Deus, et salva me.

English

Sinning daily, and not repenting, the fear of death disturbs me. For there is no redemption in Hell, have mercy on me, O God, and save me.

== Medieval poetry ==
Since the phrase "timor mortis conturbat me" was popular in medieval literature, and was frequently repeated in poetry, there are numerous poems that are conventionally titled timor mortis conturbat me because they contain the phrase.

In terms of genre, poetry in this tradition frequently appears in the form of a meditation, or a sermon that employs exempla. In some cases, the poetry also took the form of a list (e.g. a list of different famous people appears within the poem). Although the list is not technically a form of genre, it is a common medieval literary convention.

Several themes appear in timor mortis poetry which are also frequently found in other medieval poems on the subject of death. A common theme is death's triumph over people no matter how great or powerful a person was in life. Another common theme is the uncertainty of when one's life will end. Poets invariably pointed out that there is no guarantee that a person will live from one moment to the next, and that death could strike suddenly and without warning. This naturally led to the theme of the immediate need for penance and good works. It was stressed that a person should not delay in seeking penance or doing good works, lest they should perish and suffer eternally in Hell for it.

William Dunbar's "Lament for the Makaris", written around the end of the 15th century, employs the phrase at the last line of each verse. As its title indicates, the poem refers back to the titular medieval Scottish poets.

He hes done petuously devour,
The noble Chaucer, of makaris flour,
The Monk of Bery, and Gower, all thre;
Timor mortis conturbat me.

The gude Syr Hew of Eglintoun,
And eik Heryot, and Wyntoun,
He hes tane out of this cuntre;
Timor mortis conturbat me.

== In later culture ==
The first eleven stanzas of Lament for the Makaris are quoted in Chapter III of The Worm Ouroboros, by E. R. Eddison, [1922].

In The Sword in the Stone by T. H. White, [1938] the hawks' Ordeal Hymn references the traditional form, but modified for the philosophy of predators

Life is blood, shed and offered.
The eagle's eye can face this dree.
To beasts of chase the lie is proffered:
Timor Mortis Conturbat Me.
The beast of foot sings Holdfast only,
For flesh is bruckle and foot is slee.
Strength to the strong and the lordly and lonely.
Timor Mortis Exultat Me.

The phrase is a refrain in Kenneth Rexroth's 1966 poem "Thou Shalt Not Kill".

What became of Jim Oppenheim?
Lola Ridge alone in an
Icy furnished room? Orrick Johns,
Hopping into the surf on his
One leg? Elinor Wylie
Who leaped like Kierkegaard?
Sara Teasdale, where is she?
Timor mortis conturbat me.

Jack Vance parodies this convention in his novel The Palace of Love (1967). Writing through his character Navarth the Mad Poet, he relates a poem in which the stanzas end in such examples as Tim R. Mortiss degurgled me, Tim R. Mortiss disturgled me, Tim R. Mortiss occurgled me, etc.

David Markson's 2001 postmodern novel This Is Not a Novel may also be seen as an extended example of the genre. The Latin phrase appears, translated as "The fear of death distresses me," and the novel's content is dominated by an extensive catalog of how hundreds of writers and artists died.

== See also ==
- Ubi sunt
- Memento mori
