= Herriot =

Herriot is a surname. Notable people with the surname include:

== Real people ==
- Édouard Herriot (1872–1957), French politician
- James Herriot (1916–1995), British veterinary surgeon and writer
- Jim Herriot (1939–2025), Scottish footballer
- John George Herriot (1916–2003), American mathematician

== Fictional characters ==
- Zoe Herriot, character in Doctor Who

== See also ==
- Heriot (disambiguation)
- Herriott
