= George Traill (British Army officer) =

English cricketer and British Army officer

Major-General George Traill CB
- Born: George Balfour Traill; 20 June 1833; Lewisham, Kent, England
- Died: 20 November 1913 (aged 80); Battersea, London, England
- Relatives: James Traill (brother); William Traill (brother); William Hartopp (brother-in-law)
- Cricket career

Cricket information
- Batting: Unknown

Domestic team information
- Years: Team
- 1864: Marylebone Cricket Club

Career statistics
Competition	First-class
Matches	1
Runs scored	5
Batting average	5.00
100s/50s	–/–
Top score	4
Catches/stumpings	–/–
- Source: Cricinfo, 19 October 2021

George Balfour Traill CB (20 June 1833 — 20 November 1913) was a British Indian Army and British Army officer and an English first-class cricketer.

== Life ==
The son of James Traill senior (1794–1873), a Metropolitan police magistrate, and his wife Caroline Whateley, he was the younger brother of James Christie Traill, born in June 1833 at Lewisham. He was commissioned into the British Indian Army as a cornet in December 1852. He served during the Indian Rebellion of 1857 and was present at the Siege of Delhi, the Battle of Agra and the Siege of Lucknow. He was promoted to lieutenant during the rebellion in July 1857, with promotion to second captain following in October 1861, with Traill having transferred from the Bengal Artillery to the Royal Artillery.

As his military career progressed, Traill gained the rank of captain in December 1869, before being promoted to major in July 1874. A further promotion to lieutenant colonel followed, with Traill being appointed to the Staff as an Assistant Adjutant and Quartermaster-General in Ireland in April 1882. He was promoted to colonel in December of that year, before retiring in December 1887 and being granted the honorary rank of major-general. On occasion of the 50th anniversary of the Indian Rebellion, Traill was made a Member of the Order of the Bath in the 1907 Birthday Honours. He died at Battersea Park in November 1913.

== Cricketer ==
Traill played first-class cricket for the Marylebone Cricket Club (MCC) against Middlesex at Islington in 1864. Batting twice in the match, he was ended the MCC's first innings not out on 1, while in their second innings he opened the batting and was dismissed for 4 runs by V. E. Walker.

His brothers James and William both played first-class cricket.

== Family ==
Traill married in 1876 Juliana Evans, 4th daughter of Edward Bourchier Hartopp, as her second husband. She had previously been married to Charles Shuttleworth Holden of Aston Hall, Derbyshire, who died in 1872. Edward Charles Shuttleworth Holden (1865–1916) was her son by the first marriage.
