= Arthur Anderson (sprinter) =

British athlete

Personal information
- Nationality: British (English)
- Born: 30 September 1886 Twickenham, England
- Died: 21 October 1967 (aged 81) Wrotham, England

Sport
- Sport: Athletics
- Event: Sprints
- Club: University of Cambridge AC; Achilles Club; London Athletic Club

Arthur Emilius David Anderson, DSO, MC (30 September 1886 – 21 October 1967) was a British Army officer and an English track and field athlete from Brentford, who competed in the 1912 Summer Olympics.

== E Biography ==
Anderson was born in Twickenham, a village and a parish in Brentford district, Middlesex county in Greater London, England. His parents were David Anderson (b. 1844), an Anglican prebendary, and Blanch Alice May Anderson (b. 1857). He also had a sister, Mona Constance Anabel (b. 1884), and a brother, Gerrard Rupert Laurie (b. 1889)

Anderson was educated at Eton College and Trinity College, Cambridge, becoming a Cambridge blue from 1906 to 1908 in both the 440 and 880 yards events.

In 1912, Anderson was eliminated in the semi-finals of the 100 metres competition as well as of the 200 metres event.

Anderson's brother Gerard held the world record in the 440 metres hurdles and also participated in the 1912 Stockholm Olympics. In 1914, Gerard Anderson was killed in combat in the First World War.

== Military service ==
During the First World War, Anderson served with the King's Own Scottish Borderers. He was awarded the Military Cross in the 1916 Birthday Honours and appointed a Companion of the Distinguished Service Order in the 1918 New Year Honours.

== See also ==
- List of Old Etonians born in the 19th century
