= William Hartopp =

English cricketer and British Army officer

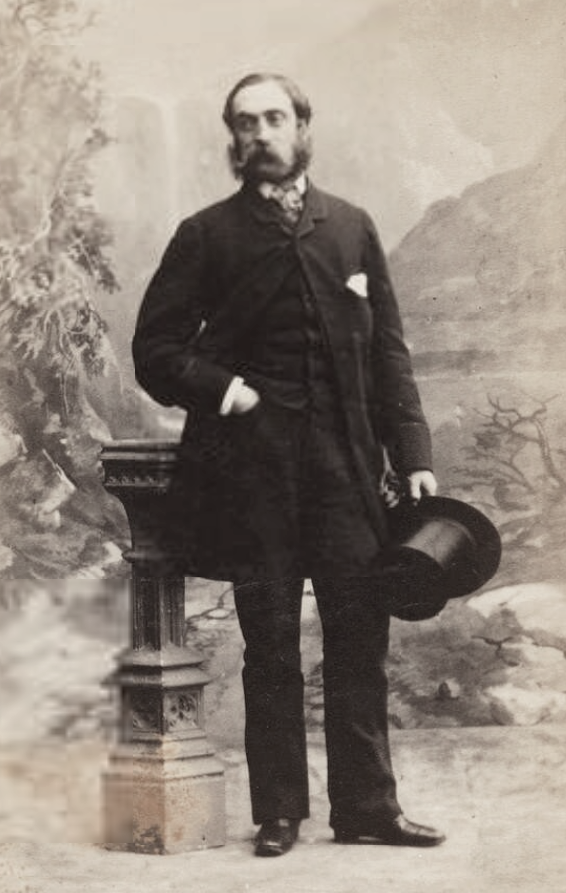
- William Wrey Hartopp, 1860 photograph

Personal information
- Full name: William Wrey Hartopp
- Born: 22 April 1836; England
- Died: 20 July 1874 (aged 38); Beaulieu, Hampshire, England
- Batting: Unknown
- Relatives: George Traill (brother-in-law); William Traill (brother-in-law); James Traill (brother-in-law)

Career statistics
Competition	First-class
Matches	1
Runs scored	6
Batting average	3.00
100s/50s	–/–
Top score	5
Catches/stumpings	–/–
- Source: Cricinfo, 1 August 2019

William Wrey Hartopp (22 April 1836 – 20 July 1874) was an English first-class cricketer and British Army officer.

== Life ==
Hartopp was the son of the politician Edward Bourchier Hartopp and his wife, Honoria Gent. He was educated at Eton College. From Eton he enlisted with the 1st The Royal Dragoons, purchasing the rank of cornet in March 1853.

Aged 18, Hartopp served in the Crimean War and took part in the Charge of the Heavy Brigade at Balaclava in October 1854, during which he was severely wounded in the leg. He was promoted to the rank of lieutenant in December 1854, while from August 1855 he served with the Royal Horse Guards. He purchased the rank of captain with the Royal Horse Guards in April 1859, before retiring from active service in August 1871.

Hartopp later moved to Penerley Lodge at Beaulieu in Hampshire with his wife. While out fishing on 20 July 1874, Hartopp was killed in an accident, with his body found wrapped around a tree having apparently fallen over a stile. His body was returned to the family ancestral home at Little Dalby, where he was buried.

== Cricketer ==
Hartopp made a single appearance in first-class cricket for the Gentlemen of England against the Gentlemen of Kent and Sussex at Canterbury in 1857. Batting twice in the match, he was dismissed in the Gentlemen of England first-innings for a single run by South Norton, while in their second-innings he was dismissed for 5 runs by James Watts.

His brothers-in-law George Traill, William Traill and James Traill all played first-class cricket.

== Family ==
Hartopp married in 1861 Lina Howe, 2nd daughter of Thomas Howe. He was survived by a son Henry Bourchier (1865–1878), and two daughters, Florence Honoria (born 1866) and Dorothy (born 1871). Florence married in 1894 James Burns-Hartopp, and they resided at Scraptoft Hall.
