= Heriot (disambiguation) =

Heriot or Heriots may refer to:

- Old English for "war-gear", see Anglo-Saxon weaponry
- Heriot, the English term used for the tenurial relief in feudal Europe, in French known as le droit du meilleur catel
- Heriot, Scottish Borders, a town in the Scottish Borders
- Heriot, New Zealand, a township in the South Island of New Zealand
- Heriot (band), a British metalcore band
- George Heriot (1563–1624), a Scottish goldsmith and philanthropist
- George Heriot (artist) (1759 – 22 July 1839), a Scottish-Canadian artist
- George Heriot's School, a school he founded in Edinburgh
- Heriot's Rugby Club, originally for former pupils of the school
- Heriot-Watt University, also named for George Heriot
- Heryot, an unidentified poet attested in William Dunbar's Lament for the Makaris

== See also ==
- Herriot
- Herriott
