= Walter Kennedy (poet) =

Scottish poet (c.1455–c.1508)

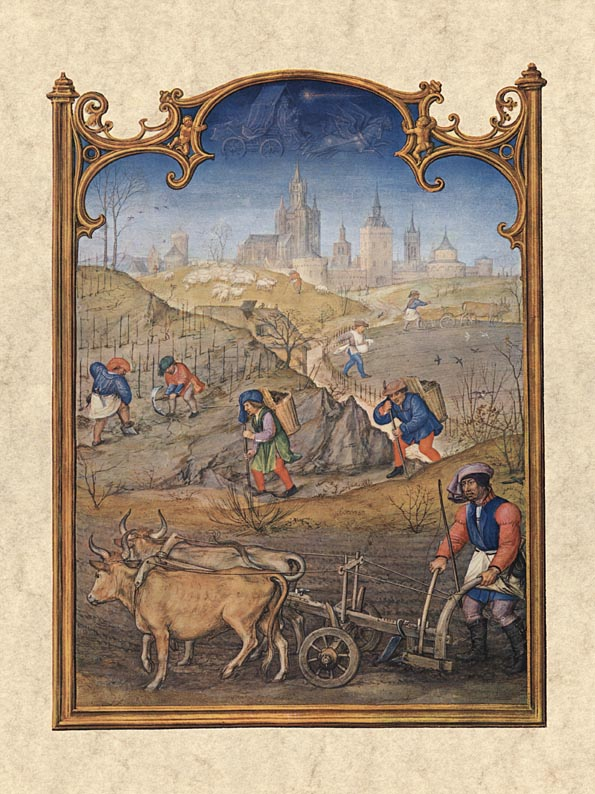
"Thow tynt cultur, I have cultur and pleuch..." Walter Kennedy (against William Dunbar) in The Flyting, l.366

Walter Kennedy (ca. 1455 – c.1508) was a Scottish poet.

Kennedy was born into the Scottish Clan Kennedy, a principal aristocratic family in Dunure, South Ayrshire. This was part of the Galloway Gàidhealtachd, a strong Gaelic-speaking area of the Scottish Lowlands. He was almost certain to have been a native speaker of the language. Educated at the University of Glasgow, he graduated in 1476, then obtained an MA in 1478.

His older brother was John Kennedy, 2nd Lord Kennedy of Dunure, Clan Kennedy. He was parson of Douglas who acquired Glentig in 1504 from John Wallace, and married Christian Hynd.

As great-grandson of Robert III and nephew of James Kennedy, bishop of St Andrews, Kennedy would have been very well-connected in the royal court. He possessed estates in both Carrick and Galloway and is known to have held ecclesiastical posts such as rector of Douglas and canon of Glasgow Cathedral although records show that his right to hold at least one of his posts was contested by the Holy See in Rome.

== Poems of Walter Kennedy ==
Walter was a Scottish makar associated with the renaissance court of James IV, perhaps best known as the defendant against William Dunbar in The Flyting of Dumbar and Kennedie, but his surviving works clearly show him to have been an accomplished "master" in many genres. It is likely that a significant body of poetry by him has been lost. His most impressive surviving poem is The Passioun.

Although Kennedy's surviving works are written in Middle Scots he may also have composed in Gaelic. In the Flyting, for instance, Dunbar makes big play of Kennedy's Carrick roots (albeit in the rankly insulting terms that are part of the genre) and strongly associates him with Erschry, which meant in other words the bardic tradition. By this time, the term Irish in Scotland signified Gaelic generally:

Sic eloquence as thay in Erschry use,
In sic is sett thy thraward appetyte.
Thow hes full littill feill of fair indyte.
I tak on me, ane pair of Lowthiane hippis
Sall fairar Inglis mak and mair perfyte
Than thow can blabbar with thy Carrik lippis.

Such eloquence as they in Irishry [Gaeldom] use
Is what defines your perverse taste.
You have very small aptitude for good verse-making.
I'll wager, a pair of Lothian hips
Shall fairer English [Lowland Scots] make and more polished
Than thou can blabber with thy Carrick lips.

Kennedy also appears at the end of Dunbar's Lament for the Makaris (c.1505) where he is described as being close to death (in poynt of dede) though there is no evidence that he died at this date. (Note: Meier posits the possibility that Kennedy may have lived until 1518, the year in which one of his sons is on record as succeeding to some of his estates.Meier 2008, p. xvii)

== Works ==
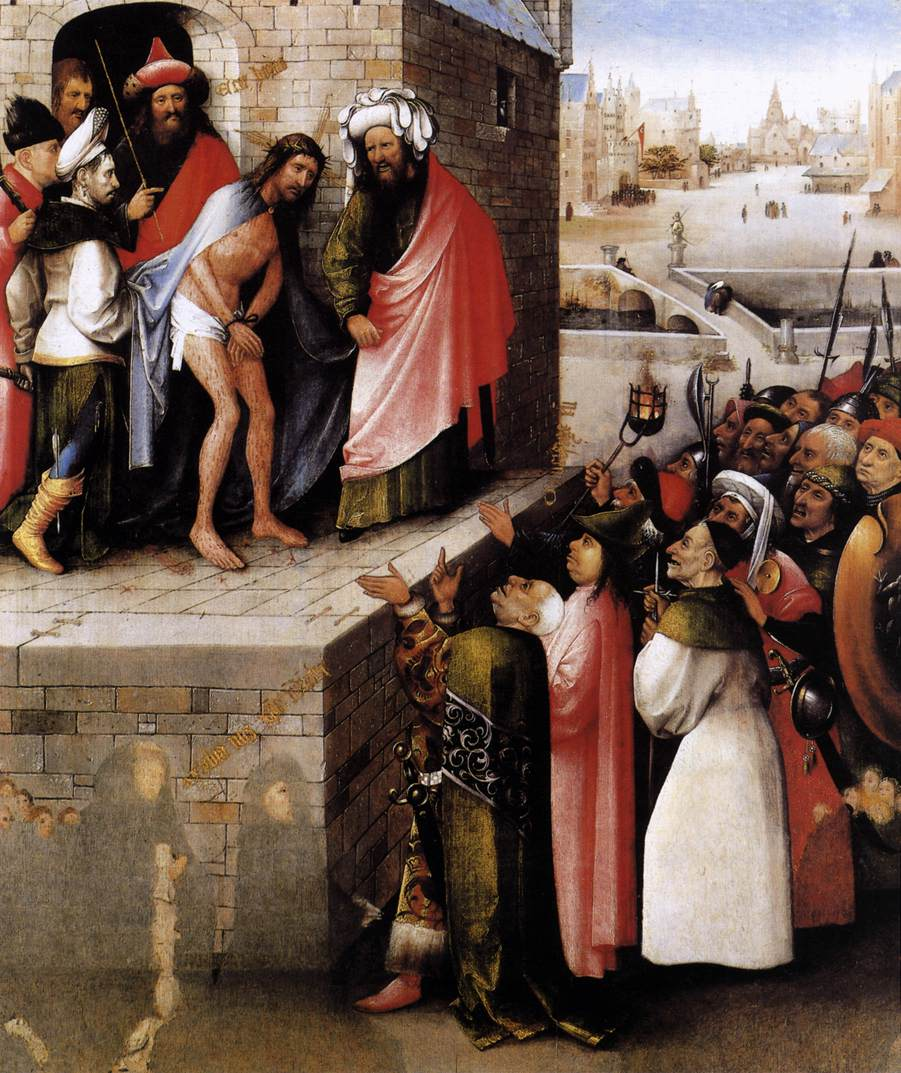
Ecce Homo, Hieronymus Bosch.

Only six works by Walter Kennedy are extant, including his contribution to the Flyting, but taken together these amount to a not insignificant 2443 lines of verse. Kennedy's longest poem is The Passioun of Crist, a courtly and successful depiction of the story of Christ from the nativity to the ascension and a significant yet neglected work altogether different in form, register and subject from the Flyting, his second longest work.

There are four other works, all much shorter but still highly various in genre:

- An aigit man, twys fourty yeiris
- At Matyne hour, in myddis of the nycht
- Ane Ballat of Our Lady
- Leif luve, my luve, na langar it lyk

Walter Kennedy was an acclaimed poet in his lifetime. Both Gavin Douglas and Sir David Lyndsay paid tribute to him as a fellow makar in their works.

== Influence ==
The twentieth-century poet William Neill, interested in Kennedy's South Ayrshire roots and his possible role as a Gaelic speaker in the Scottish court, has incorporated tributes to the makar into his own writing. One example is the Gaelic poem Chuma Bhaltair Cinneide (In Memory of Walter Kennedy) which opens:

Chunnaic mi Bhaltair Cinneide

a' coiseachd troimh clach mo shùl
fo sgàil a' Chaisteal Dhuibh,
aig àm laighe ne greine
is grinneal fo chois
air tràigh liath Dhùn Iubhair...

I saw Walter Kennedy
walking through the apple of my eye
under the shadow of the Black Vault,
at the time of sunset,
and the gravel under his feet

on the grey beach of Dunure...
