= List of Old Etonians born in the 18th century =

The following notable old boys of Eton College were born in the 18th century.

== 1700s ==
- Thomas Morell (1703–1784), classical scholar
- Henry Fox, 1st Baron Holland (1705–1774), Secretary at War, 1746–1754, Secretary of State for the Southern Department, 1755–1756, and Paymaster General, 1757–1765
- Henry Fielding (1707–1754), novelist
- Other Windsor, 3rd Earl of Plymouth (1707–1732)
- William Pitt, 1st Earl of Chatham (1708–1778), Paymaster General, 1746–1755, Secretary of State for the Southern Department, 1756–1757, 1757–1761, and Prime Minister, 1766–1768
- Francis Dashwood, 11th Baron le Despencer (1708–1781), Chancellor of the Exchequer, 1762–1763
- George Lyttelton, 1st Baron Lyttelton (1709–1773), Chancellor of the Exchequer, 1755–1756
- Thomas Arne (1710–1778), composer

== 1710s ==
- George Grenville (1712–1770), First Lord of the Admiralty, 1762–1763, Prime Minister and Chancellor of the Exchequer, 1763–1765
- Edward Cornwallis (1713–1776), Lieutenant-General and founder of Halifax, Nova Scotia
- Frederick Cornwallis (1713–1783), Bishop of Lichfield and Coventry, 1750–1766, Dean of St Paul's, 1766–1768, and Archbishop of Canterbury, 1768–1783
- John Stuart, 3rd Earl of Bute (1713–1792), Secretary of State for the Northern Department, 1761–1762, and Prime Minister, 1762–1763
- Henry Bathurst, 2nd Earl Bathurst (1714–1794), Lord Chancellor, 1771–1778
- Charles Lyttelton (1714–1768), Bishop of Carlisle, 1762–1768, and antiquary
- Charles Pratt, 1st Earl Camden (1714–1794), Lord Chancellor, 1766–1770
- Thomas Gray (1716–1771), poet
- Horace Walpole, 4th Earl of Orford (1717–1797), author and politician
- John Montagu, 4th Earl of Sandwich (1718–1792), First Lord of the Admiralty, 1748–1751, 1771–1782, and Secretary of State for the Northern Department, 1763–1765, 1770–1771
- George Selwyn (1719–1791), politician and wit
- Edward Weston (1703–1770), politician and Chief Secretary of Ireland

== 1720s ==
- Lieutenant-General John Manners, Marquess of Granby (1721–1770), Master-General of the Ordnance, 1763–1766, and Commander-in-Chief of the Forces, 1766–1770
- Daniel Dulany the Younger (1722–1797), Maryland Loyalist politician, Mayor of Annapolis, and lawyer.
- William Lyttelton, 1st Baron Lyttelton of Frankley (1724–1808), Governor of South Carolina, 1756–1760, and Jamaica, 1762–1766, and Ambassador to Portugal, 1766–1771
- Brigadier-General George Howe, 3rd Viscount Howe (1725–1758), soldier
- Sir David Dalrymple, Lord Hailes (1726–1792), advocate, historian, and Scottish Lord of Session, 1766–1792, and Lord of Justiciary, 1776–1792
- Admiral of the Fleet Richard Howe, 1st Earl Howe (1726–1799), Commander-in-Chief, North American Station, 1775–1778, First Lord of the Admiralty, 1783–1788, and Vice-Admiral of England, 1792–1796
- General William Howe, 5th Viscount Howe (1729–1814), Commander-in-Chief, North America, 1775–1778, and Lieutenant-General of Ordnance, 1782–1803

== 1730s ==
- Frederick North, 2nd Earl of Guildford (8th Baron North) (1732–1792), Chancellor of the Exchequer, 1767–1770, and Prime Minister, 1770–1782
- Sir James Mansfield (1733–1821), Solicitor General, 1780–1782, and Lord Chief Justice of Common Pleas, 1804–1814
- Shute Barrington (1734–1826), Bishop of Llandaff, 1769–1782, Salisbury, 1782–1791, and Durham, 1791–1826
- John Horne Tooke (1736–1812), politician and philologist
- Henry Penruddocke Wyndham (1736–1819), politician and topographer
- General Charles Cornwallis, 1st Marquess Cornwallis (1738–1805), Governor-General of India, 1786–1793, Master-General of the Ordnance, 1795–1801, and Viceroy of Ireland, 1798–1801

== 1740s ==
- Henry Jerome de Salis FRS (1740–1810), clergyman and antiquarian
- Sir Joseph Banks (1743–1820), naturalist and President of the Royal Society, 1778–1820
- Rowland Hill (1744–1833), pastor
- Thomas Lyttelton, 2nd Baron Lyttelton (1744–1779), politician
- Thomas Fyshe Palmer (1747–1802), Unitarian minister
- William Coxe (1747–1828), historian
- Sir Uvedale Price (1747–1829), author
- George Robert FitzGerald (c.1748–1786), Irish eccentric, charged with murder
- Charles James Fox (1749–1806), Secretary of State for Foreign Affairs, 1782, 1783, 1806
- Thomas Lynch, Jr. (1749–1779), signatory of the United States Declaration of Independence

== 1750s ==
- John Graves Simcoe (1752-1806)Army officer, founder of Toronto
- Lord George Gordon (1751–1793), politician and agitator
- Charles Stanhope, 3rd Earl Stanhope (1753–1816), politician and scientist
- George Cranfield Berkeley (1753–1818), senior Royal Navy admiral
- Sir George Beaumont, 7th Baronet (1753–1827), art patron
- Somerset Davies (1754–1817), politician
- General John Hely-Hutchinson, 2nd Earl of Donoughmore (1757–1832), Commander-in-Chief, Egypt, 1801
- Lieutenant-Colonel John Enys (1757–1818), soldier
- William Grenville, 1st Baron Grenville (1759–1834), Secretary of State for Foreign Affairs, 1791–1801, and Prime Minister, 1806–1807
- Richard Porson (1759–1808), Regius Professor of Greek, University of Cambridge, 1792–1808
- Richard Wellesley, 1st Marquess Wellesley (1760–1842), Governor-General of India, 1797–1805, Secretary of State for Foreign Affairs, 1809–1812, and Lord Lieutenant of Ireland, 1821–1828, 1833–1834

== 1760s ==
- William Wellesley-Pole, 3rd Earl of Mornington (1763–1845), Chief Secretary for Ireland, 1809–1812, and Master of the Mint, 1814–1823
- Charles Grey, 2nd Earl Grey (1764–1845), Secretary of State for Foreign Affairs, 1806–1807, and Prime Minister, 1830–1834
- Mad Jack Fuller (1757–1834), eccentric philanthropist, Member of Parliament for Southampton from 1780 to 1784, and Member of Parliament for Sussex from 1801 to 1812.
- Field Marshal Arthur Wellesley, 1st Duke of Wellington (1769–1852), Commander, Mysore, 1799–1802, the Deccan, 1803–1805, and the Iberian Peninsula, 1808–1814, Master-General of the Ordnance, 1818–1827, Commander-in-Chief of the Forces, 1827–1828, 1842–1852, and Prime Minister, 1828–1830, 1834
- George Canning (1770–1827), Secretary of State for Foreign Affairs, 1807–1809, 1822–1827, Prime Minister and Chancellor of the Exchequer, 1827

== 1770s ==
- John Keate (1773–1852), Headmaster of Eton, 1809–1834
- Edward Vernon Utterson (c. 1776–1856), lawyer, one of the Six Clerks in Chancery, literary antiquary, collector and editor
- George 'Beau' Brummell (1778–1840), dandy
- John Rogers (1778–1856), theologian, landlord and scientist.
- John Broadhurst (1778-1861), British Member of Parliament
- William Lamb, 2nd Viscount Melbourne (1779–1848), Home Secretary, 1830–1834, and Prime Minister, 1834, 1835–1841
- John Bird Sumner (1780–1862), Bishop of Chester, 1828–1848, and Archbishop of Canterbury, 1848–1862

== 1780s ==
- John Bettesworth-Trevanion (1780–1840), MP for Penryn
- Francis Hodgson (1781–1852), Provost of Eton (1840–1852)
- Stratford Canning, 1st Viscount Stratford de Redcliffe (1786–1880), ambassador
- John Lonsdale (1788–1867), Principal of King's College London (1838–1843), Bishop of Lichfield (1843–1867)
- Charles Richard Sumner (1790–1874), Bishop of Winchester, 1827–1874

== 1790s ==
- Francis James Newman Rogers KC (1791–1851), judge and legal author
- Sir John Herschel (1792–1871), astronomer and mathematician
- John George Lambton, 1st Earl of Durham (1792–1840), Governor General of Canada, 1838–1840, and politician
- Percy Bysshe Shelley (1792–1822), poet
- Henry Michell Wagner (1792–1870), Vicar of Brighton (1824–1870)
- John Crichton-Stuart, 2nd Marquess of Bute
- Major-General Sir George Cathcart (1794–1854) Governor of Cape Colony, 1852–1853
- Charles Cavendish Fulke Greville (1794–1865), Clerk of the Privy Council, 1821–1859
- Rees Howell Gronow (1794–1865), Welsh Grenadier Guards officer and memoirist
- Samuel Jones-Loyd, Baron Overstone (1796–1883), Banker and politician
- Joseph Henry Blake (1797–1849), Irish peer and socialist
- Sir John George Shaw-Lefevre (1797–1879), Vice-Chancellor, University of London, 1842–1862, and Clerk of the Parliaments, 1855–1875
- Richard William Jelf (1798–1871), Principal of King's College London (1843–1868)
- William Evans (1798–1877), painter and schoolmaster at Eton
- Thomas Denman, 1st Baron Denman (1799–1854), Attorney General, 1830–1832, and Lord Chief Justice, 1832–1850
- Edward Smith-Stanley, 14th Earl of Derby (1799–1869), Colonial Secretary, 1833–1834, and Prime Minister, 1852, 1858–1859, 1866–1868
- Edward Pusey (1800–1882), Regius Professor of Hebrew, University of Oxford, 1828–1882
- John Pakington, 1st Baron Hampton (1799–1880) Politician

== See also ==
- List of Old Etonians born before the 18th century
- List of Old Etonians born in the 19th century
- List of Old Etonians born in the 20th century
