= Traill =

Traill may refer to:

- Traill (surname), including a list of people with the name
- Traill County, North Dakota, a county in the U.S.
- Traill International School, in Bangkok, Thailand
- Traill Island, in eastern Greenland
- 'Traill', a cultivar of barley
- Kapp Traill, headland at the southern part of Jan Mayen in Norway named after Thomas Stewart Traill

== See also ==
- Trail (disambiguation)
- Miss Traill's House, historic property in Bathurst, Australia
- Mr. Perrin and Mr. Traill, a 1911 novel and 1948 film
- Traill's flycatcher, supposed bird species
