= Evelyn Metcalfe =

English cricketer

Personal information
- Full name: Evelyn James Metcalfe
- Born: 29 September 1865; Kennington, Surrey, England
- Died: 14 June 1951 (aged 85); Cambridge, Cambridgeshire, England
- Batting: Right-handed
- Bowling: Unknown

Domestic team information
- Years: Team
- 1894/95–1898/99: Queensland
- 1903: Hertfordshire

Career statistics
Competition	First-class
Matches	2
Runs scored	53
Batting average	17.66
100s/50s	–/–
Top score	26*
Balls bowled	48
Wickets	1
Bowling average	21.00
5 wickets in innings	–
10 wickets in match	–
Best bowling	1/21
Catches/stumpings	–/–
- Source: Cricinfo, 8 July 2019

Evelyn James Metcalfe (29 September 1865 – 14 June 1951) was an English first-class cricketer.

Metcalfe was born at Kennington in September 1865. He was educated at Eton College. Shortly after leaving Eton he emigrated to Australia, where he would spend the next 25 years. He played first-class cricket while living in Australia for Queensland against New South Wales in 1895, and South Australia in 1899. He scored 53 runs and took a single wicket in this two first-class matches. He was referred to by Wisden as one of the best slip fieldsmen in Australia. He visited England during the summer of 1903, playing minor counties cricket for Hertfordshire and making seven appearances in the Minor Counties Championship. Upon his return to England he took teams on tours to Philadelphia and Canada. In addition to playing cricket, Metcalfe also played lawn tennis for Queensland. He died at Cambridge in June 1951.
