= Ivo Branch =

British Army officer

- Education: University College, Oxford
- Relatives: Edward Branch (father); Charles Hector Diarmuid St John Branch (son)
- Military career
- Allegiance: United Kingdom
- Branch: British Army
- Service years: 1872-1898
- Rank: Brigadier
- Unit: 1st Regiment of Life Guards
- Commands: Cavalry Division
- Conflicts: 1882 Anglo-Egyptian War; Battle of Tel el-Kebir
- Awards: Companion of the Order of the Bath; Commander of the Royal Victorian Order

Ivo William Ulick Fennell Branch CB CVO (b. 1851; d. 1928) was a British Army officer.

== Life and military career ==
Educated at Eton and University College, Oxford, Branch was commissioned a second lieutenant in the 1st Regiment of Life Guards in March 1872.

Branch served as aide-de-camp to George Bingham, 3rd Earl of Lucan, 1874–77. His particularly undistinguished military career included being criticised for 'rashness' and 'absent-minded, uncalculating enthusiasm' in the face of the enemy during the British occupation of Egypt. His reputation was besmirched by accusations of bisexuality. Branch was one of several senior army officers implicated in the Cleveland Street scandal in 1889, accused of being protected by his privilege.

Nevertheless, he was appointed Commander of the Royal Victorian Order in 1898.
