= Arthur Borton =

Recipient of the Victoria Cross

Lieutenant-Colonel Arthur Borton VC CMG DSO
- Born: 1 July 1883; Cheveney, Kent
- Died: 5 January 1933 (aged 49); Southwold, Suffolk
- Burial place: Hunton Parish Burial Ground, Hunton, Maidstone, Kent
- Relatives: General Sir Arthur Borton (grandfather); Air Vice Marshal Amyas Borton (brother)
- Military career
- Allegiance: United Kingdom
- Branch: British Army; Royal Naval Volunteer Reserve
- Service years: 1902–1908; 1914–1919
- Rank: Lieutenant Colonel
- Units: King's Royal Rifle Corps; Royal Flying Corps; RNAS Armoured Cars; London Regiment
- Commands: 2/22nd (County of London) Battalion
- Conflicts: Second Boer War; First World War; Russian Civil War
- Awards: Victoria Cross; Companion of the Order of St Michael and St George; Distinguished Service Order; Mentioned in Despatches; Order of the Nile (Egypt); Order of St. Vladimir (Russia)

Lieutenant-Colonel Arthur Drummond Borton, VC, CMG, DSO (1 July 1883 – 5 January 1933) was a British Army officer and a recipient of the Victoria Cross, the highest award for gallantry in the face of the enemy that can be awarded to British and Commonwealth forces.

== Biography ==
Borton was born at Cheveney, Kent to British officer Arthur Close Borton, the eldest son of General Sir Arthur Borton and Adelaide Beatrice Drummond, a grandchild of Robert Kaye Greville. Borton was educated at Eton College and the Royal Military College, Sandhurst, before being commissioned into the King's Royal Rifle Corps in 1902 with whom he served in the Second Boer War. In 1908 he left the army as unfit for general service.

At the start of the First World War, Borton was fruit farming in the United States. He returned to England and re-joined The King's Royal Rifles in 1914. After further service with the regiment he became an observer with the Royal Flying Corps in France, where he broke his neck in three places when his aircraft crashed and was declared unfit. Despite this he went to Gallipoli as a lieutenant commander in the Royal Naval Volunteer Reserve, where he won the Distinguished Service Order serving with the RNAS Armoured Cars. Borton was appointed second-in-command of the 2nd/22nd London Regiment (The Queen's) in June 1916, serving in France and Palestine.

He was a 34-year-old lieutenant colonel in the 2/22nd (County of London) Battalion, the London Regiment, British Army, when the following deed took place for which he was awarded the VC.

On 7 November 1917 in Palestine, Borton deployed his battalion for attack and at dawn led his companies against a strongly held position. When the leading waves were checked by withering fire, he moved freely up and down the line under heavy fire and then led his men forward, capturing the position. At a later stage he led a party of volunteers against a battery of field-guns in action at point-blank range, capturing the guns and the detachments. His fearless leadership was an example to the whole brigade.

He died on 5 January 1933 at Southwold in Suffolk, aged 49.

His Victoria Cross is displayed at the Queen's Royal Surrey Regiment Museum, Clandon Park, Guildford, Surrey.

Borton's younger brother was Air Vice Marshal Amyas Borton. He married Lorna Lockhart in 1915.

== Honours and awards ==
Victoria Cross (VC)	
Companion of the Order of St Michael and St George (CMG)	
Companion of the Distinguished Service Order (DSO)	1915 as an officer in the RNVR
Queen's South Africa Medal	with three bars
1914–15 Star	
British War Medal	
Victory Medal	
Knight of the Order of the Nile	(Egypt)
4th Class of the Order of St. Vladimir	(Russia)

== Bibliography ==
- Ingleton, Roy (2011). Kent VCs. Pen and Sword Books. ISBN 978-1848844094.
