= Edward Branch (British Army officer) =

British Army officer

Sir Edward Branch KCMG CB
- Born: 1803
- Died: 1871 (aged 67–68)
- Education: Eton
- Relatives: Ivo Branch (son)
- Military career
- Allegiance: United Kingdom
- Branch: British Army
- Service years: 1824-1851
- Rank: Colonel
- Nickname: Dickie
- Service number: 19684
- Unit: The Life Guards
- Commands: Cavalry Division

Sir Edward Algernon St. Maur Branch KCMG CB (b. 1803, Michaelston-super-Ely; d. 1871) was a British Army officer.

== Life and military career ==
Born to cavalry officer Ivo Nathaniel March Fennell Branch at Michaelston-super-Ely, Branch was educated at Eton and the Royal Military College, Sandhurst. He was commissioned as a second lieutenant [a cornet] in the 1st Regiment of Life Guards, part of the Household Cavalry in 1824. Appointed Commander of the Order of the Bath and Knight Commander of the Order of St Michael and St George for his military service.

The father of cavalry officer Ivo Branch and a relation of Royal Air Force fighter pilot Guy Branch, one of "The Few".
