= George Vance (cricketer) =

English cricketer

Personal information
- Full name: George Vance
- Born: 1814; Paignton, Devon, England
- Died: 5 March 1839 (aged 25); Hampstead, Middlesex, England
- Batting: Unknown
- Role: Wicket-keeper

Domestic team information
- Years: Team
- 1835–1838: Oxford University

Career statistics
Competition	First-class
Matches	6
Runs scored	78
Batting average	7.80
100s/50s	–/–
Top score	41
Catches/stumpings	–/2
- Source: Cricinfo, 6 March 2020

George Vance (1814 – 5 March 1839) was an English first-class cricketer and clergyman.

The son of George Vance senior, he was born at Paignton in 1814. He was educated at Eton College, before going up to Exeter College, Oxford. While studying at Oxford, he played first-class cricket for Oxford University, making his debut against the Marylebone Cricket Club at Lord's in 1835. He played first-class cricket for Oxford until 1838, making six appearances. Playing as a wicket-keeper, he scored 78 runs in his six matches, at an average of 7.80 and a high score of 41. Behind the stumps he made two stumpings. After graduating from Oxford, Vance took holy orders in the Church of England and became the curate of Kensington in 1838. He died in March the following year, after falling from his horse at Hampstead.
