= Robert Moore (English cricketer) =

English cricketer and clergyman

Personal information
- Full name: Robert Moore
- Born: 9 January 1812; Hunton, Kent, England
- Died: 29 October 1857 (aged 45); Mayfair, London, England
- Batting: Unknown
- Bowling: Unknown

Domestic team information
- Years: Team
- 1834–1835: Oxford University

Career statistics
Competition	First-class
Matches	3
Runs scored	28
Batting average	9.33
100s/50s	–/–
Top score	15
Balls bowled	?
Wickets	8
Bowling average	?
5 wickets in innings	–
10 wickets in match	–
Best bowling	4/?
Catches/stumpings	–/–
- Source: Cricinfo, 16 June 2020

Robert Moore (9 January 1812 – 29 October 1857) was an English first-class cricketer and clergyman.

The son of The Reverend Robert Moore, he was born in January 1812 at Hunton, Kent. He was educated at Eton College, before going up to Christ Church, Oxford. While studying at Oxford, made three appearances in first-class cricket for Oxford University against the Marylebone Cricket Club in 1834 and 1835. He scored 28 runs in these matches, in addition to taking eight wickets.

After graduating from Oxford, Moore took holy orders in the Church of England in 1858. He served as the rector of Wetheringsett until his death at Mayfair in October 1857.
