= Trail (disambiguation) =

A trail is a route for travel.

Trail may also refer to:

== Places ==
- Trail, British Columbia, Canada
- Trail, Minnesota, United States
- Trail, Oregon, United States

== People with the name ==
- Trail (surname), e.g., the Scottish clan also known as Traill
- Chet Trail (born 1944), American baseball player

== Other uses ==
- Ant trail; see also Animal track
- Trail (graph theory)
- Trail, design parameter for vehicles with two in-line wheels, such as bicycles and motorcycles
- Trail, the trailing end of a gun carriage
- TRAIL, acronym in molecular biology for "TNF-related apoptosis-inducing ligand"
- Pointertrails, or mouse trails, show where the GUI pointer has been recently
- Technical Report Archive & Image Library, also known as TRAIL
- Trails (series), series of video games

== See also ==
- Auto trail, a former, informal network of marked roads in United States and Canada
- Contrail, a condensation trail
- Distrail, a dissipation trial
- Path (disambiguation)
- T-rail, flanged T rail for railroading
- Vapor trail
