= Henry Dunell =

English cricketer

Personal information
- Full name: Owen Henry Christian Dunell
- Born: 22 October 1886; Paddington, London, England
- Died: 13 September 1950 (aged 63); West Malling, Kent, England
- Batting: Unknown
- Bowling: Unknown
- Relatives: Owen Dunell (father)

Domestic team information
- Years: Team
- 1905–1909: Norfolk
- 1909/10: Eastern Province

Career statistics
Competition	First-class
Matches	1
Runs scored	1
Batting average	0.50
100s/50s	–/–
Top score	1
Balls bowled	12
Wickets	0
Bowling average	–
5 wickets in innings	–
10 wickets in match	–
Best bowling	–
Catches/stumpings	1/–
- Source: Cricinfo, 14 July 2019

Owen Henry Christian Dunell (22 October 1886 – 13 September 1950) was an English first-class cricketer.

The son of the South African Test cricketer Owen Dunell, he was born at Paddington in October 1886. He was educated at Eton College, before going up to Trinity College, Oxford. He played minor counties cricket for Norfolk from 1905–09, making sixteen appearances in the Minor Counties Championship. He later travelled to South Africa, where he made a single appearance in first-class cricket for Eastern Province against the touring Marylebone Cricket Club at Port Elizabeth in 1910. Batting twice in the match, he was dismissed without scoring in the Eastern Province first-innings by Colin Blythe, while in their second-innings he was dismissed for a single run by George Thompson. He died at West Malling in September 1950.
