= Arthur Borton (British Army officer, born 1814) =

British Army general and Governor of Malta (1814–1893)

General Sir Arthur Borton GCB GCMG
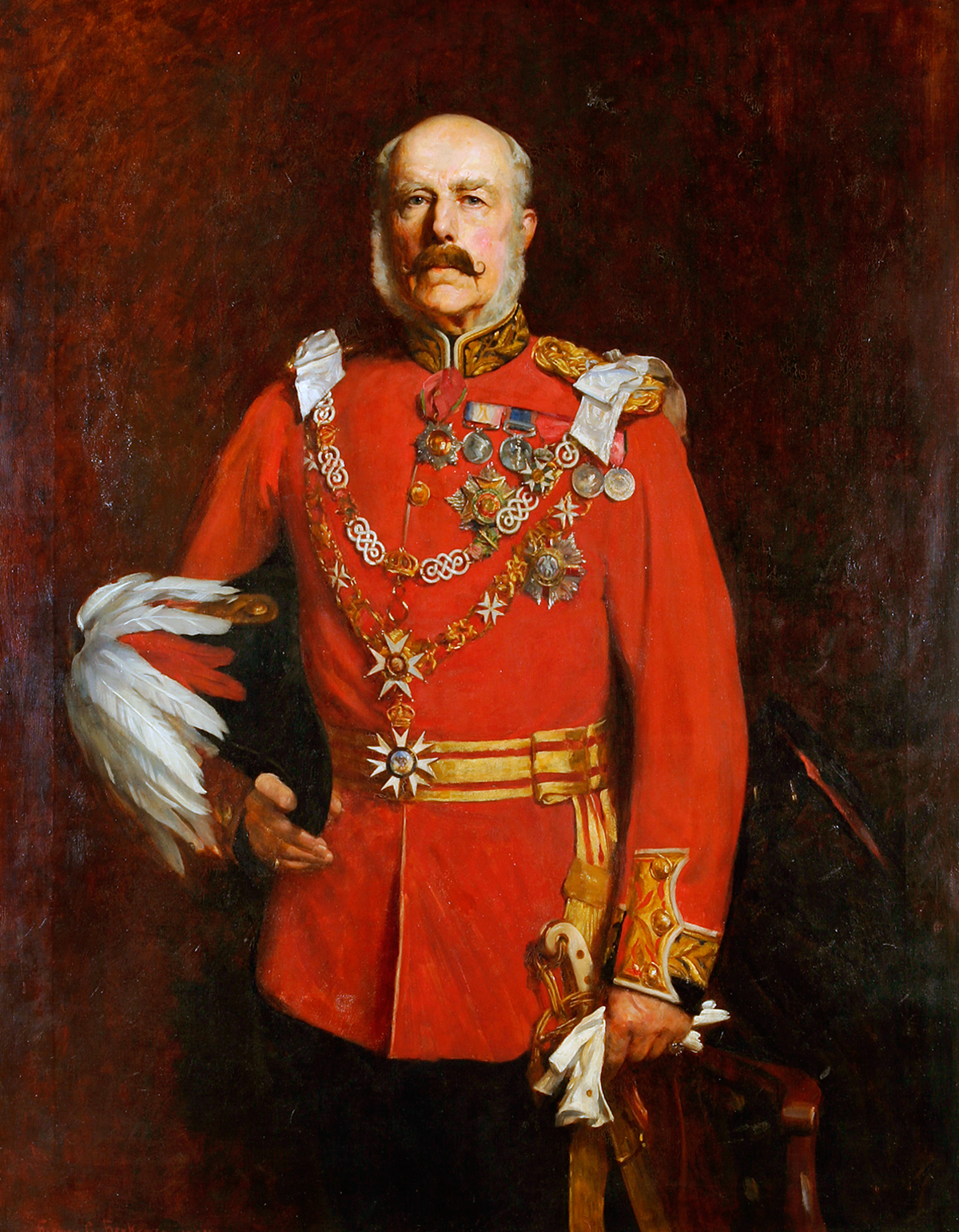
- Born: 20 January 1814; Blofield, Norfolk, England
- Died: 7 September 1893 (aged 79); London, England
- Relatives: Lieutenant Colonel Arthur Borton (grandson); Air Vice-Marshal Amyas Borton (grandson)
- Military career
- Allegiance: United Kingdom
- Branch: British Army
- Service years: 1832–1884
- Rank: General
- Commands: Mysore Division; 9th (East Norfolk) Regiment of Foot
- Conflicts: First Anglo-Sikh War; Crimean War
- Awards: Knight Grand Cross of the Order of the Bath; Knight Grand Cross of the Order of St Michael and St George; Knight of the Legion of Honour (France); Order of the Medjidie, 3rd Class (Ottoman Empire)
- Other work: Governor of Malta

General Sir Arthur Borton, GCB, GCMG (20 January 1814 – 7 September 1893) was a British Army officer who served as Governor of Malta from 1878 to 1884.

== Early life ==
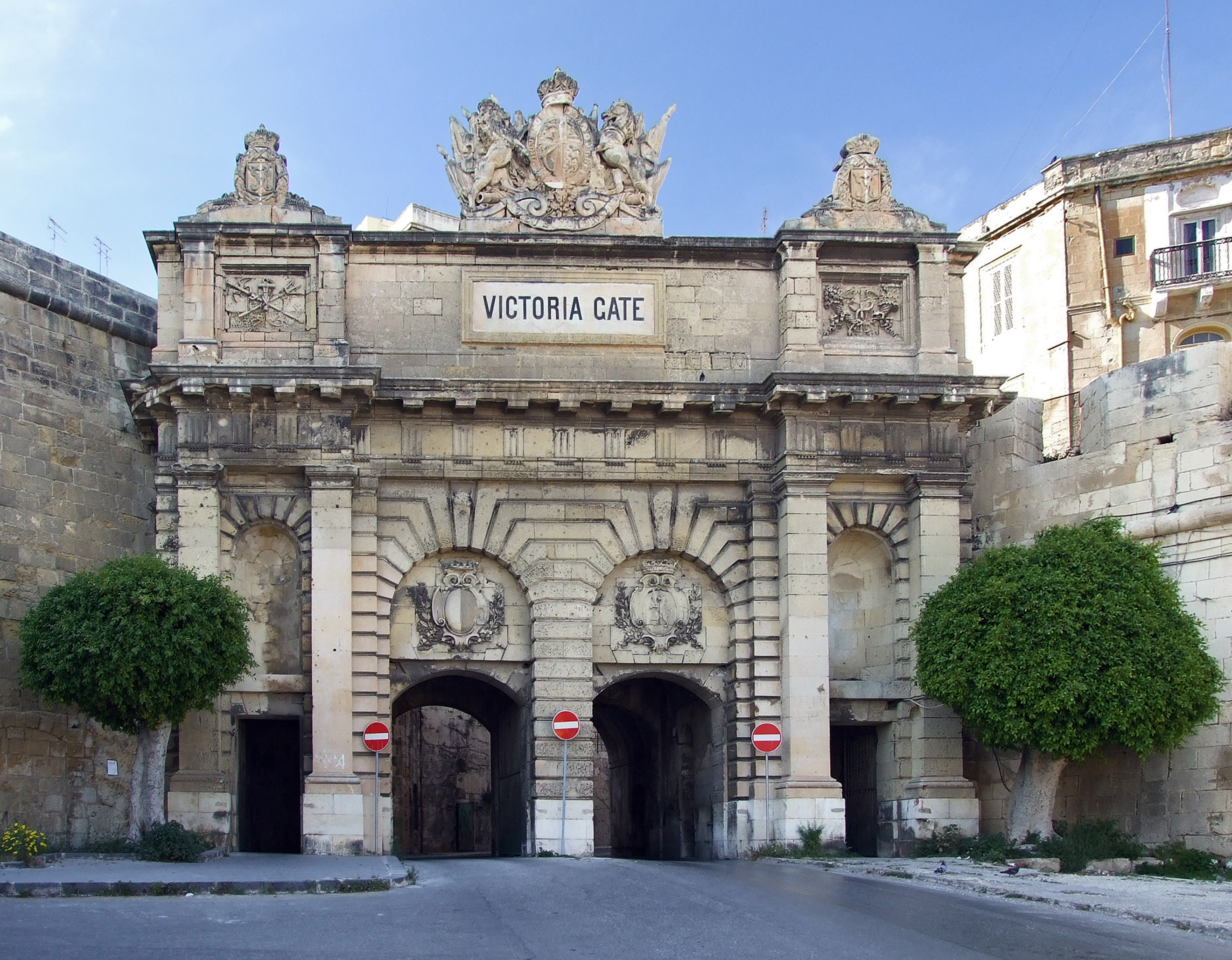
Victoria Gate in Valletta: the foundation stone was laid by Sir Arthur Borton

Borton was born on 20 January 1814 in Blofield, Norfolk, where his father John Drew Borton was the rector. His mother was Louisa Carthew, one of the daughters of Rev Thomas Carthew of Woodbridge Abbey in Suffolk. He was educated at Eton College and the Military College, Sandhurst.

Confederate soldier Collett Leventhorpe was his kinsman.

== Military career ==
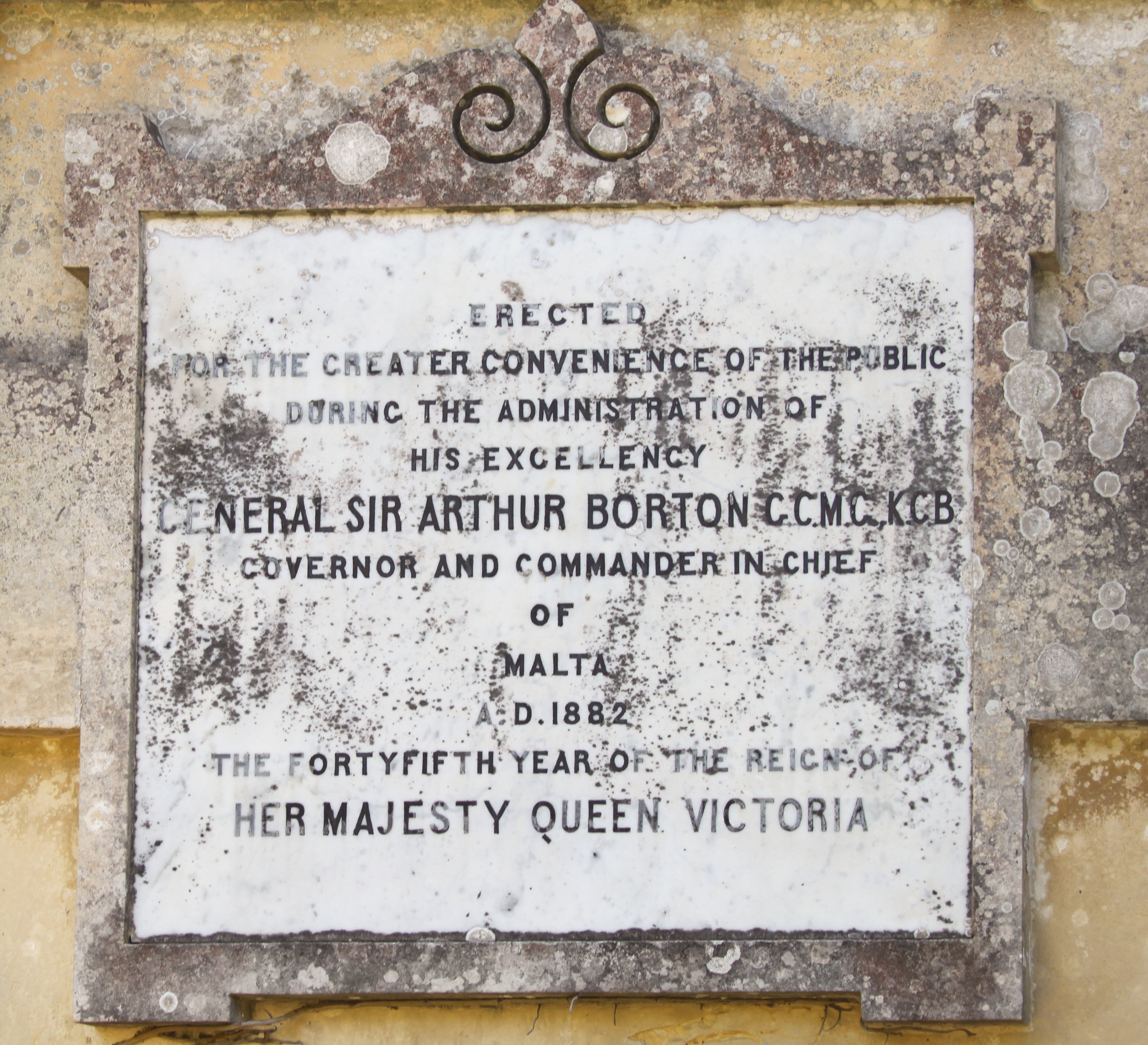
Plaque mentioning Borton at San Anton Palace

Borton was commissioned into the 9th (East Norfolk) Regiment of Foot in 1832. He took part in the First Anglo-Sikh War in 1845 and in 1854–55 he commanded the regiment at the siege of Sevastopol during the Crimean War. He became commander of an infantry brigade at the Curragh in Ireland in 1866 and General Officer Commanding the Mysore division of the Madras Army in 1870. Promoted to full general in 1877, he became Governor of Malta in 1878 before retiring in June 1884.

Borton was Colonel of the 1st West India Regiment from 1876 to 1888, and Colonel of the Norfolk Regiment from 1889 to 1893.

He died on 7 September 1893 at his residence, 105 Eaton Place, London, and was buried on 9 September at Hunton, near Maidstone, Kent.

== Family life ==
Borton married Caroline Mary Georgina Close in 1850, daughter of Rev John Forbes Close of Morne of County Down. They had two sons: Arthur Close Barton, later a lieutenant-colonel in the Somerset Light Infantry and the father of Lieutenant Colonel Arthur Drummond Borton and Air Vice-Marshal Amyas Eden Borton, and Charles Edward Borton, later a lieutenant-colonel in the Norfolk Regiment, who served in the Second Anglo-Afghan War and the Second Boer War.

Political offices
Preceded by Sir Charles van Straubenzee	Governor of Malta; 1878–1884	Succeeded by Sir Lintorn Simmons
