= The Passioun of Crist =

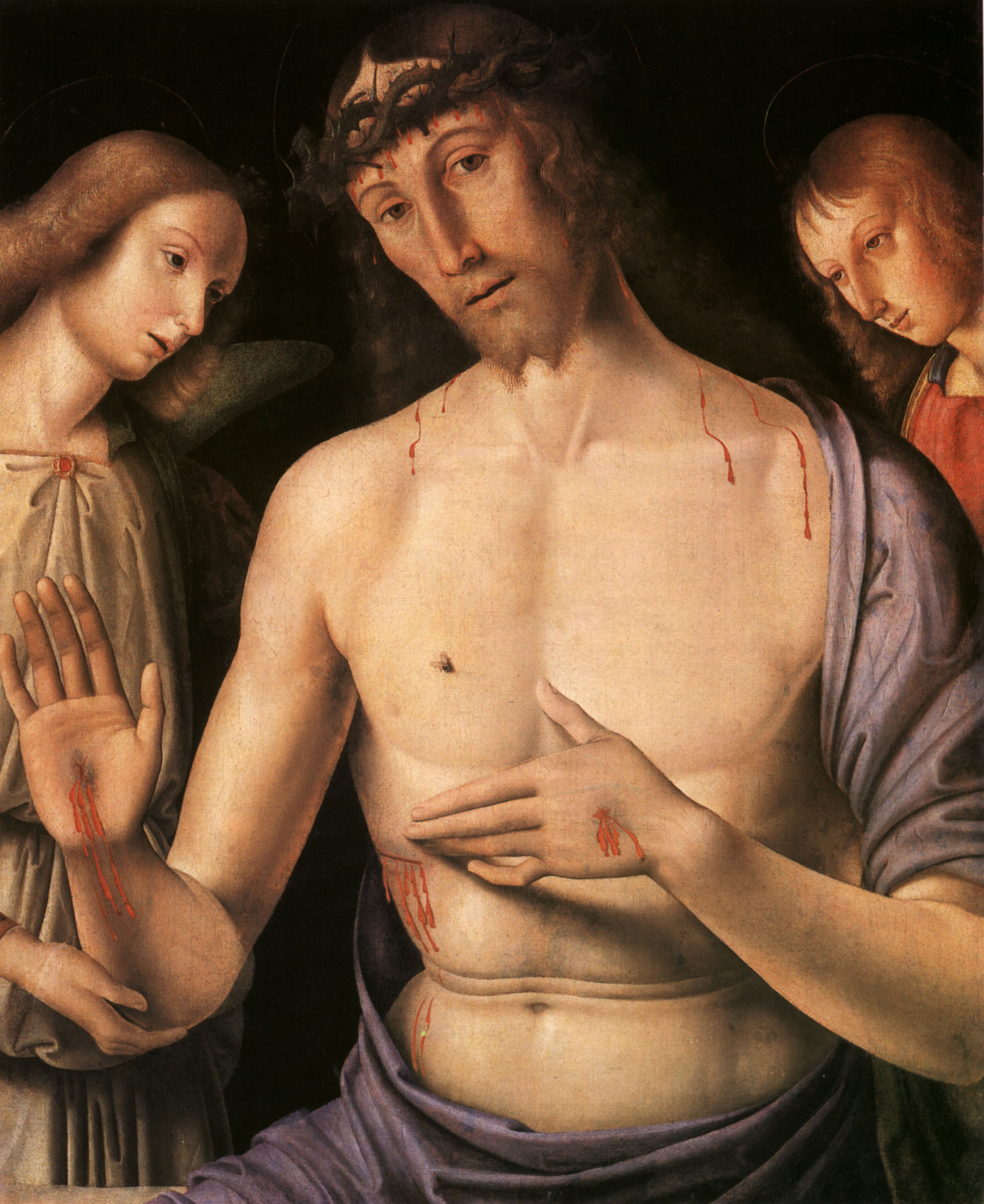
Christ supported by two Angels, Giovanni Santi. c.1490.

The Passioun of Crist, which begins Hail, Cristin knycht, haill, etern confortour... is a long poem in Middle Scots by the Scottish makar Walter Kennedy, who was associated with the renaissance court of James IV of Scotland. It is Kennedy's longest surviving work and a significant, though historically neglected work of Scottish literature.

The poem is not just a narrative of the Passion, but in fact gives an account, in the vernacular, of the life of Christ from the nativity to the resurrection and ascension composed in the courtly rhyme royal stanza.

It has 245 stanzas (1715 lines) in total.
