= James Traill (bishop) =

British Anglican priest

James Traill DD (died 1783) was an Anglican bishop in the second half of the 18th century.

A Scot, he held incumbencies at Horsleydown and West Ham. He was Chaplain to Francis Seymour-Conway, 1st Marquess of Hertford, Lord Lieutenant of Ireland who elevated him to the Bishopric of Down and Connor in 1765.

He died on 12 November 1783.
