= James Traill (cricketer) =

English cricketer, barrister (1826–1899)

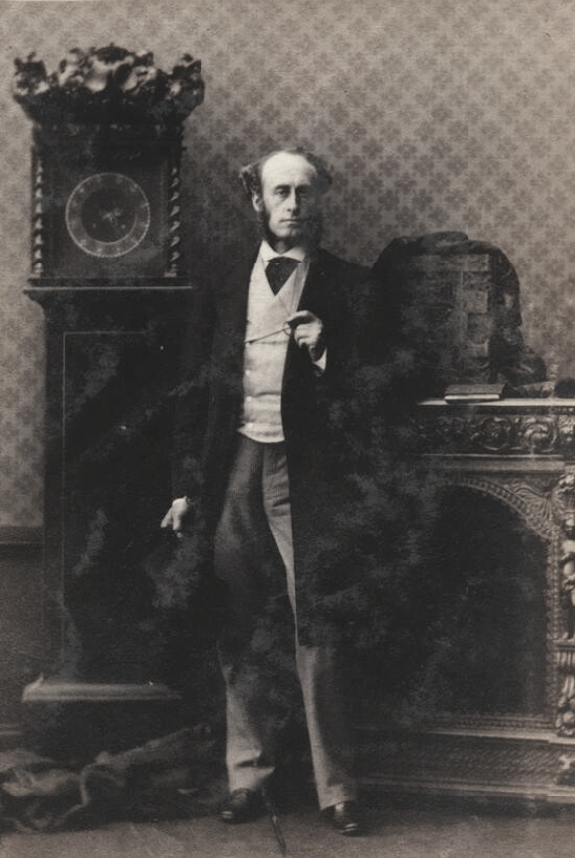
- James Christie Traill, 1861 photograph

Personal information
- Full name: James Christie Traill
- Born: 1826; Walworth, Surrey, England
- Died: 6 February 1899 (aged 72–73); Fulham, Middlesex, England
- Batting: Unknown
- Bowling: Unknown
- Relatives: George Traill (brother); William Traill (brother); William Hartopp (brother-in-law)

Domestic team information
- Years: Team
- 1848: Oxford University

Career statistics
Competition	First-class
Matches	3
Runs scored	19
Batting average	3.80
100s/50s	–/–
Top score	7
Balls bowled	84
Wickets	4
Bowling average	?
5 wickets in innings	–
10 wickets in match	–
Best bowling	2/?
Catches/stumpings	–/–
- Source: Cricinfo, 7 April 2020

James Christie Traill JP DL (1826 – 6 February 1899) was an English first-class cricketer and barrister.

== Life ==
The son of James Traill senior (1794–1873), a Metropolitan police magistrate, and his wife Caroline Whateley, he was born in 1826 at Walworth, Surrey. George Balfour Traill was his younger brother. He matriculated at St John's College, Oxford in 1845, graduating B.A. 1849, M.A. 1852,.

A student of the Inner Temple, Traill was called to the bar in January 1853. In 1873 he inherited from his father the family estate in Orkney, Ratter and Hobbister. He was appointed to be a deputy lieutenant of Caithness in April 1875, in addition to serving as a justice of the peace for the county. Traill died at Fulham in February 1899.

== Cricketer ==
While studying at Oxford, he made his debut in first-class cricket for Oxford University against the Marylebone Cricket Club at Oxford in 1848. The following year he made two further first-class appearances for the Gentlemen of Kent against the Gentlemen of England at Lord's and Canterbury in 1849. Traill scored 19 runs in his three first-class matches, in addition to taking 4 wickets.

His brothers, George and William, also played first-class cricket, as did his brother-in-law William Hartopp.

== Works ==
- A Letter to ... the Marquis of Blandford, on the management of Church property (1856)
- The New Parishes Acts, 1843, 1844, & 1856 (1857)

== Family ==
Traill married in 1857 Julia Lambarde, second daughter of William Lambarde of Sevenoaks. Two of their sons, James William (1858–1917) and John Murray (1865–1914), were killed in World War I.
