= James Hamilton Traill =

- Born: 2 November 1896; Cassilis, New South Wales, Australia
- Died: 14 August 1967 (aged 70); Tuwinga, Bundella, New South Wales, Australia
- Military career
- Allegiance: Australia
- Branch: Australian Imperial Force (1914–17); Australian Flying Corps (1917–18)
- Service years: 1914–18
- Rank: Lieutenant
- Unit: No. 1 Squadron AFC
- Conflicts: First World War
- Awards: Distinguished Flying Cross

James Hamilton Traill, DFC (2 November 1896 – 14 August 1967) was an Australian flying ace of the First World War credited with six aerial victories.
