= Owen Dunell =

South African cricketer

Personal information
- Full name: Owen Robert Dunell
- Born: 15 July 1856; Port Elizabeth, Cape Colony
- Died: 21 October 1929 (aged 73); Lyon, France
- Batting: Right-handed

International information
- National side: South Africa
- Test debut (cap 1): 12 March 1889 v England
- Last Test: 25 March 1889 v England

Career statistics
Competition	Test	First-class
Matches	2	3
Runs scored	42	79
Batting average	14.00	15.80
100s/50s	0/0	0/0
Top score	26*	26*
Catches/stumpings	1/–	3/–
- Source: Cricinfo, 13 November 2022

Owen Robert Dunell (15 July 1856 – 21 October 1929) was a South African cricketer who captained his country in its first Test match in 1888/89. He was also an early association footballer who played for Oxford University at the 1877 FA Cup Final.

== Education ==
Although born in Port Elizabeth, Cape Colony, Dunell was educated in England at Eton College and at Trinity College, Oxford, where he graduated BA in 1878 and Master of Arts in 1883.

== Cricket career ==
Dunell was a right-handed batsman. He played for the Port Elizabeth team in the Champion Bat Tournament between 1880 and 1888. He was Port Elizabeth's leading batsman when they won the 1884–85 competition, and also in the 1887–88 competition. These matches are not regarded as being first-class.

Dunell played only three first-class games, two of them Test matches in March 1889. He captained South Africa in the first, and was replaced by William Milton for the second. The two Tests were the first two first-class matches in South Africa. His only other first-class match was for Port Elizabeth against Natal the following year.

== Football career ==
Dunell also played football in his youth, in position of full back, for Oxford University as well as two matches as a football 'Blue' with Cambridge University in 1877 and 1878. C.W. Alcock described him as "a very safe and neat kick; a thoroughly reliable back, though a little wanting, perhaps, in pace". He appeared in the 1877 FA Cup Final against Wanderers at Kennington Oval, which his team lost. He was a member of the Football Association committee in 1878.

== Later life ==
Dunell spent some time in business in Natal, but settled in England, living at New Alresford, Hampshire, and ultimately in South Kensington, London. He died while visiting Lyon in France, at the age of 73. His son, Henry, also played first-class cricket.

Preceded by none	South African national cricket captain 1888/9	Succeeded by William Milton
