= William Traill =

English cricketer and barrister

William Frederick Traill (7 January 1838 – 3 October 1905) was an English barrister and first-class cricketer.

== Life ==
He was born in Lewisham, the fourth son of James Traill, stipendiary magistrate, and his wife Caroline Whateley; George Traill was his uncle. his brothers James Christie Traill (eldest son, for Oxford U.) and George Balfour Traill (born 1833, for the MCC) also played cricket. Another brother, the sixth son, was Henry Duff Traill (1842–1900).

Traill was educated at Merchant Taylors' School and St John's College, Oxford, where he matriculated in 1856, and graduated B.A. in 1860. From 1858 to 1867, he played cricket for Kent, Oxford University and Marylebone Cricket Club (MCC).

He died in South Hampstead.

== Works ==
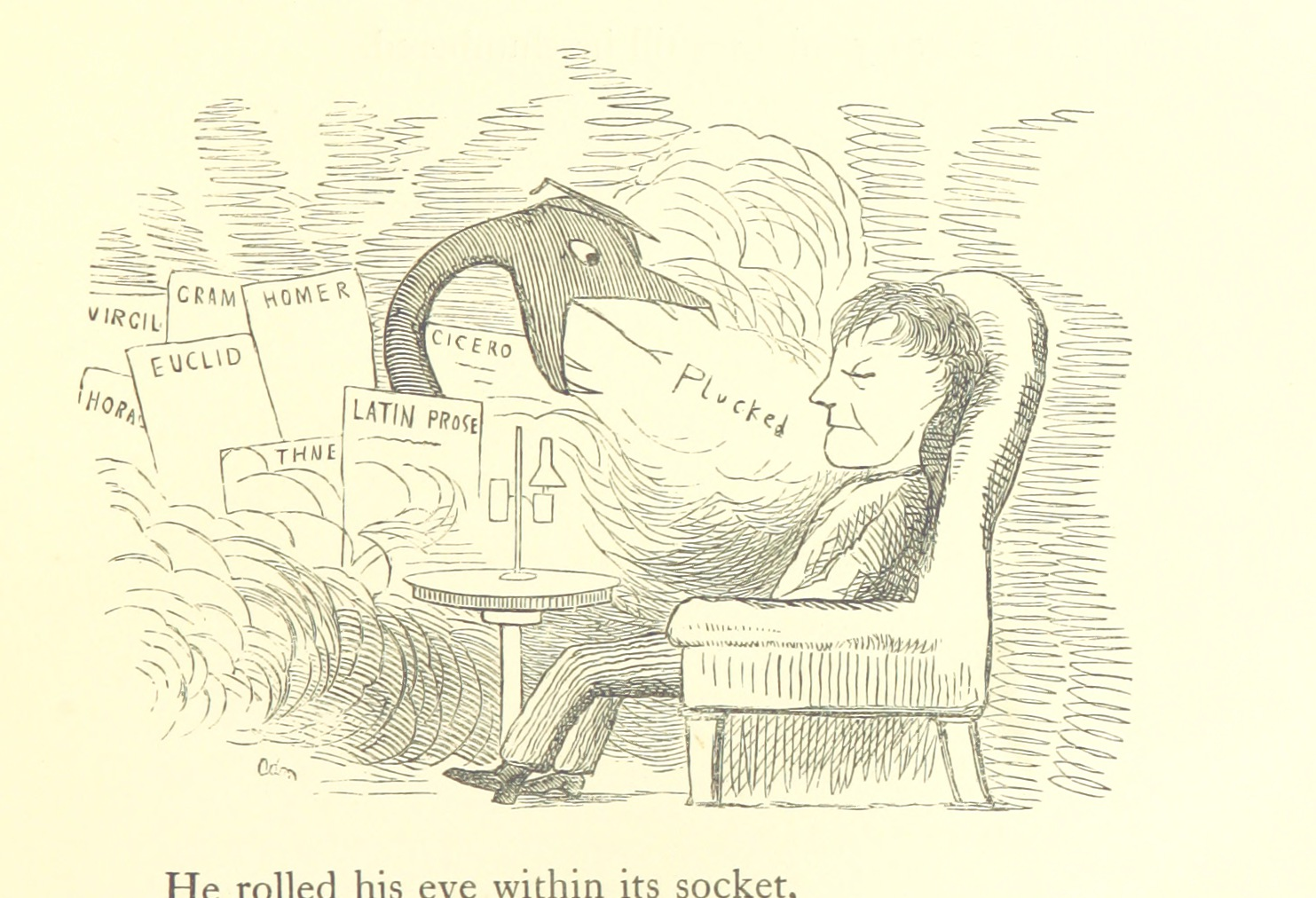
Illustration from page 65 of Lays of Modern Oxford

Traill wrote verse, under the pseudonym "Adon". His works included:

- Lays of Modern Oxford (1874 and later editions), with illustrations by Mary Ellen Edwards
- Through Storm and Sunshine (1875)

Drawing on undergraduate experiences, Traill wrote a volume of stories, Tales of Modern Oxford (1882). It features a Bullingdon Club dinner, and the ragging of a drunken college porter, made up blackface with burnt cork, and robed in academic dress.

== Bibliography ==
- Carlaw, Derek (2020). Kent County Cricketers, A to Z: Part One (1806–1914) (PDF). Cardiff: ACS.
