= Charles Garnett (cricketer) =

English cricketer

Personal information
- Full name: Charles Arthur Garnett
- Born: 15 January 1840; Manchester, Lancashire, England
- Died: 3 September 1919 (aged 79); Duncan, British Columbia, Canada
- Batting: Unknown
- Bowling: Unknown

Domestic team information
- Years: Team
- 1860–1862: Oxford University

Career statistics
Competition	First-class
Matches	4
Runs scored	27
Batting average	3.85
100s/50s	–/–
Top score	17
Balls bowled	40
Wickets	5
Bowling average	?
5 wickets in innings	1
10 wickets in match	–
Best bowling	5/?
Catches/stumpings	1/–
- Source: Cricinfo, 20 November 2019

Charles Arthur Garnett (15 January 1840 – 3 September 1919) was an English first-class cricketer.

The son of Charles Garnett and his wife, Marianne Garnett (née Willock), he was born at Manchester in January 1840. He was educated at both Eton College and Cheltenham College. He was in the cricket eleven at the latter. From Cheltenham he proceeded to Trinity College, Oxford. While studying at Oxford he made his debut in first-class cricket for Oxford University against Cambridge University at Lord's in 1860, before making two further first-class appearances for Oxford in 1862 against the Marylebone Cricket Club (MCC) and Cambridge. His 5 first-class wickets all came in one innings against the MCC. He also made an additional first-class appearance in 1862 for the Gentlemen of the North against the Gentlemen of the South. Garnett later emigrated to British Columbia, where he died at Duncan in September 1919.
