= Lionel Garnett (cricketer) =

English cricketer

Personal information
- Full name: Lionel Garnett
- Born: 25 December 1843; Lancaster, Lancashire, England
- Died: 1 May 1912 (aged 68); Belfast, Ireland

Career statistics
| Competition | First-class |
|---|---|
| Matches | 1 |
| Runs scored | 3 |
| Batting average | – |
| 100s/50s | 0/0 |
| Top score | 3* |
| Catches/stumpings | 0/– |
- Source: Cricinfo, 26 February 2020

Lionel Garnett (25 December 1843 – 1 May 1912) was an English first-class cricketer and clergyman.

The son of Henry Garnett, he was born in December 1843 at Lancaster. He was educated at Eton College, before matriculating at Brasenose College, Oxford in 1862, graduating B.A. in 1865. He made a single appearance in first-class cricket for Southgate Cricket Club against Oxford University in 1864 at Oxford. After graduating from Oxford, Garnett took holy orders in the Church of England. His first ecclesiastical posting was as curate of St Mary's Church, Sheffield from 1867 to 1869, before becoming the rector of Christleton, Cheshire from 1869. He was appointed a canon of Chester Cathedral in 1906. Garnett later moved to Belfast, where he died in May 1912.
