= List of Old Etonians born in the 20th century =

The following notable pupils of Eton College were born in the 20th century.

== 1900s ==
- Thomas Bevan (1900–1942), first-class cricketer and British Army officer
- Colin Cokayne-Frith (1900–1940), first-class cricketer and British Army officer
- King Leopold III of the Belgians (1901–1983), King of the Belgians, 1934–1951
- John Strachey (1901–1963)
- Philip Evergood (1901–1973)
- Victor Hely-Hutchinson (1901–1947)
- Sir Gubby Allen (1902–1989), England cricketer
- Peter Cazalet (1907–1973), English cricketer, jockey, racehorse owner and trainer
- Lord David Cecil (1902–1986), literary critic
- Christopher Hollis (1902–1977), intelligence officer
- Dadie Rylands (1902–1999), Cambridge don and member of the Bloomsbury Group
- Prince Nicholas of Romania (1903–1978)
- Norman Barrett (1903–1979)
- Edward Chichester, 6th Marquess of Donegall (1903–1975)
- Cyril Connolly (1903–1974), author and journalist
- Douglas Douglas-Hamilton, 14th Duke of Hamilton (1903–1973) aviator, first man to fly over Mount Everest
- Alec Douglas-Home, Baron Home of the Hirsel (1903–1995), Secretary of State for Foreign Affairs, 1960–1963, 1970–1974, and Prime Minister, 1963–1964
- Roger K. Furse (1903–1972), film designer
- Sir John Heygate (1903–1976)
- Sir Roger Mynors (1903–1989)
- George Orwell (1903–1950), novelist
- Sir Steven Runciman (1903–2000), historian
- James Hamilton, 4th Duke of Abercorn (1904–1979)
- Sir Harold Acton (1904–1994), writer and aesthete
- Francis Thomas Bacon (1904–1992)
- Cameron Cobbold, 1st Baron Cobbold (1904–1987), Governor, Bank of England, 1949–1961, and Lord Chamberlain, 1963–1971
- Sir Paul Mason (1904–1978), diplomat
- Oliver Messel (1904–1978), artist and stage designer
- Godfrey Meynell (1904–1935), North West Frontier Victoria Cross
- J. H. C. Whitehead (1904–1960)
- Sir Watkin Williams-Wynn, 10th Baronet (1904–1988), Lord Lieutenant of Denbighshire and of Clwyd
- Robert Byron (1905–1941), traveller, writer, art critic and historian
- David Cecil, 6th Marquess of Exeter (1905–1981), hurdler, politician, and chairman, 1936–1966, and President, 1966–1977, British Olympic Association
- Henry Green (1905–1973), novelist
- Bryan Guinness, 2nd Baron Moyne (1905–1992), poet and novelist
- Brian Howard (1905–1958), writer
- Sir Harry Hylton-Foster (1905–1965), politician, Solicitor General for England and Wales, 1954–1959, and Speaker of the House of Commons, 1959–1965
- Seymour de Lotbiniere (1905–1984), BBC Director of outside broadcasting
- Frank Pakenham, 7th Earl of Longford (1905–2001), politician and writer
- John Tew (1905–1992), cricketer and solicitor
- Sir Trenchard Cox (1906–1995), museum director
- George Douglas-Hamilton, 10th Earl of Selkirk (1906–1994), politician, Chancellor of the Duchy of Lancaster, 1955–1957 and First Lord of the Admiralty 1957–1959. First Commissioner to newly independent Singapore
- Anthony Powell (1906–2000), novelist
- William Astor, 3rd Viscount Astor (1907–1966), politician
- Cuthbert Bardsley (1907–1991), bishop
- Peter Fleming (1907–1971), writer, traveller and journalist
- James Graham, 7th Duke of Montrose (1907–1992), politician
- Sir Rupert Hart-Davis (1907–1999), publisher
- Quintin Hogg, Baron Hailsham of St Marylebone (1907–2001), Lord Chancellor, 1970–1974, 1979–1987
- John Lehmann (1907–1987), poet and editor
- Ian Fleming (1908–1964), novelist and author of the James Bond series of spy novels
- James Lees-Milne (1908–1997), author and diarist
- Alan Pryce-Jones (1908–2000), journalist and liberal politician
- John Morgan, 6th Baron Tredegar (1908–1962), peer and landowner
- Sir Anthony Wagner (1908–1995), herald of arms
- Seymour Berry, 2nd Viscount Camrose (1909–1995), Chairman, The Daily Telegraph, 1987
- Douglas Blackwood (1909–1997), publisher and Battle of Britain fighter pilot
- Lord Malcolm Douglas-Hamilton (1909–1964), politician and aviator
- Paul Gore-Booth, Baron Gore-Booth (1909–1984), High Commissioner to India, 1960–1965, and Permanent Under-Secretary of State for Foreign and Commonwealth Affairs, 1965–1969
- Charles John Lyttelton, 10th Viscount Cobham (1909–1977)
- Anthony Mildmay (1909–1950), amateur steeplechase jockey
- William Sidney, 1st Viscount De L'Isle (1909–1991), Second World War Victoria Cross
- Reynolds Stone (1909–1979)
- Peter Thorneycroft, Baron Thorneycroft (1909–1994), Chancellor of the Exchequer (1957–1958)
- General Sir Kenneth Darling (1909–1998)
- Richard Ormonde Shuttleworth (1909–1940), racing driver and aviator
- Robert Boothby, Baron Boothby (1900–1986), conservative politician, author and broadcaster, and associate of the Kray twins
- Thomas Mitford (1909–1945) aristocrat and soldier, alleged supporter of fascism

== 1910s ==
- Sir Archibald Southby (1910–1988), cricketer and soldier
- Sir A. J. Ayer (1910–1989), philosopher and author
- Lewis Clive (1910–1938), Spanish Civil War fighter
- Sir Robin Darwin (1910–1974), Principal, Royal College of Art, 1948–1967, and painter
- Samuel Hood, 6th Viscount Hood (1910–1981), diplomat
- Charles Moore, 11th Earl of Drogheda (1910–1990), managing director, 1945–1970, and chairman, 1971–1975, The Financial Times
- Edward Agar, 5th Earl of Normanton (1910–1967), landowner and soldier
- Ernest Sheepshanks (1910–1937), Yorkshire cricketer and Reuters war correspondent
- Robert Still (1910–1971), composer
- Sir Wilfred Thesiger (1910–2003), explorer and travel writer
- David Boyle, 9th Earl of Glasgow (1910–1984)
- Michael Berry, Baron Hartwell (1911–2001), Chairman and Editor-in-Chief, The Daily Telegraph, 1954–1987, and The Sunday Telegraph, 1961–1987
- Guy Burgess (1911–1963), intelligence officer and double agent
- Randolph Frederick Edward Churchill (1911–1968), journalist and Conservative Member of Parliament (1940–1945); son of Sir Winston Churchill
- Brigadier Bernard Fergusson, Baron Ballantrae (1911–1980), Governor-General of New Zealand, 1962–1967
- Sir Fitzroy Maclean of Dunconnel (1911–1996)
- Alexander Ogston, (1911–1996), surgeon; discovered Staphylococcus aureus
- David Astor (1912–2001), Editor, The Observer, 1948–1975
- William Douglas-Home (1912–1992)
- Sir John Arbuthnot, 1st Baronet (1912–1992), politician
- James Fisher (1912–1970), ornithologist
- Christopher Furness (1912–1940), Second World War recipient of the Victoria Cross
- Brian Johnston (1912–1994), radio commentator, author, and television personality
- Pen Tennyson (1912–1941), film director
- Birabongse Bhanudej, Prince Birabongse of Thailand (1913–1988)
- Sir Charles Villiers (1912–1992), businessman and one-time Chairman of British Steel
- Charles McLaren, 3rd Baron Aberconway (1913–2003)
- Guy Branch (1913–1940), one of The Few and Empire Gallantry Medal holder
- Lionel Brett, 4th Viscount Esher (1913–2004), architect
- Martin Charteris, Baron Charteris of Amisfield (1913–1999), Private Secretary to the Queen
- Jo Grimond, Baron Grimond (1913–1993)
- General Paramasiva Prabhakar Kumaramangalam (1913–2000), Chief of Staff - Indian Army
- Peter Lawrence (1913–2005), teacher
- Charles Lyell, 2nd Baron Lyell (1913–1943), Second World War recipient of the Victoria Cross
- Thomas Daniel Knox, 6th Earl of Ranfurly (1914–1988), Second World War
- Lieutenant General Sir Philip Neame recipient of the Victoria Cross
- Captain Guy Ruggles-Brise (1914–2000), Second World War commando, POW, stockbroker, land-owner
- Richard Kay-Shuttleworth, 2nd Baron Shuttleworth (1937–1940), a fighter pilot killed in the Battle of Britain
- Michael Morris, 3rd Baron Killanin (1914–1999)
- William Henry Rhodes-Moorhouse (1914–1940), Royal Air Force pilot; killed in the Battle of Britain
- Antony Fisher (1915–1988) British businessman and think tank founder
- John Brocklebank (1915–1974), aristocrat, first-class cricketer, British Army major
- Michael Magill (1915–1940), first-class cricketer
- James Palmer-Tomkinson (1915–1952)
- Derek Prince (1915–2003), international Bible teacher
- Surendra Mohan Kumaramangalam (1916–1973) Indian politician and communist theorist
- Robin Maugham, 2nd Viscount Maugham (1916–1981)
- Dennis Poore (1916–1987), racing driver, entrepreneur and financier, Chairman, Manganese Bronze Holdings
- Geoffrey Keyes (1917–1941), Second World War recipient of the Victoria Cross
- George Mann (1917–2001), cricketer
- Nigel Nicolson (1917–2004), author and journalist
- Gavin Astor, 2nd Baron Astor of Hever (1918–1984), President, Times newspapers, 1967–1981
- Rowland Baring, 3rd Earl of Cromer (1918–1991), Governor, Bank of England, 1961–1966, managing director, Baring Brothers & Co, 1948–1961, 1967–1970
- Granville Leveson-Gower, 5th Earl Granville (1918–1996), Lord Lieutenant of the Western Isles
- Sir Roger de Grey (1918–1995), visual artist; President of the Royal Academy (1984–1993)
- Michael England (1918–2007), cricketer
- Peter Opie (1918–1982), historian of childhood lore
- David Ormsby-Gore (1918–1985), politician and British Ambassador to the USA
- Tim Westoll (1918–1999), Chairman of Cumberland and Cumbria County Council 1959–1976
- Michael Benthall (1919–1974), theatre director
- Denis Cannan (1919–2011), dramatist and screenwriter
- Peter Carington, 6th Baron Carrington (1919–2018), Secretary of State for Defence, 1970–1974, Secretary of State for Foreign and Commonwealth Affairs, 1979–1982, and Secretary General of NATO, 1984–1988
- Sir Ludovic Kennedy (1919–2009), journalist, broadcaster, political activist and author

== 1920s ==
- Andrew Cavendish, 11th Duke of Devonshire (1920–2004), Minister of State for Commonwealth Relations 1962–1964
- Henry Chadwick (1920–2008), Regius Professor of Divinity, University of Oxford, 1959–1969, Regius Professor of Divinity, University of Cambridge, 1969–1979, and Master of Peterhouse, Cambridge, 1987–1993
- John Edmondson, 2nd Baron Sandford (1920–2009), politician and clergyman
- Michael Farebrother (1920–1987), cricketer and educator
- David Jamieson (1920–2001), Second World War recipient of the Victoria Cross
- Sir John Jardine Paterson (1920–2000), Calcutta businessman
- John Maynard Smith (1920–2004), evolutionary biologist
- John Pelham, 7th Earl of Yarborough (1920–1991)
- Peter Benenson (1921–2005), founder of Amnesty International
- Fiennes Cornwallis, 3rd Baron Cornwallis (1921–2010)
- Humphrey Lyttelton (1921–2008), jazz musician, band leader, composer, and chairman of BBC radio programme I'm Sorry I Haven't a Clue
- Michael Bentine (1922–1996), actor and comedian
- Hugo Charteris (1922–1970), author and screenwriter
- Adrian Liddell Hart (1922–1991), author and adventurer
- Patrick Macnee (1922–2015), actor
- Edward Boyle, Baron Boyle of Handsworth (1923–1981), Financial Secretary to the Treasury, 1959–1962, and Vice-Chancellor, University of Leeds, 1970–1981
- Field Marshal Edwin Bramall, Baron Bramall (1923–2019), Commander-in-Chief, United Kingdom Land Forces, 1976–1978, Vice Chief of the Defence Staff, 1978–1979, and Chief of the General Staff, 1979–1982
- James Chichester-Clark, Baron Moyola (1923–2002), Prime Minister of Northern Ireland, 1969–1971
- Charles Howard, 12th Earl of Carlisle, (1923–1994)
- Michael Jaffé (1923–1997)
- George Lascelles, 7th Earl of Harewood (1923–2011), managing director, 1972–1985, and chairman, 1986–1995, English National Opera, and President, British Board of Film Classification, 1985–1997
- Nicholas Mosley (1923–2017), author
- Richard Ollard (1923–2007), author, editor and historian
- Sir John Smith (1923–2007), director, Coutts and Co, 1950–1993
- Prince Alexander of Yugoslavia (1924–2016)
- Edward Thomas Hall (1924–2001), scientist
- Robin Howard (1924–1989), philanthropist, dance patron and founder of The Place
- Myles Ponsonby (1924–1999), intelligence officer, diplomat, British Ambassador to Mongolia
- John Bayley (1925–2015), Warton Professor of English, University of Oxford, 1974–1992
- Sir William Gladstone, 7th Baronet (1925–2018), Headmaster of Lancing College, 1961–1969, and Chief Scout of the United Kingdom, 1972–1982
- Michael Keeling (1925–2017), cricketer
- Julian Mond, 3rd Baron Melchett (1925–1973) English industrialist and Chairman British Steel Corporation 1966–1973
- John Spencer-Churchill, 11th Duke of Marlborough (1926–2014)
- Robert Goff, Baron Goff of Chieveley (1926–2016), Lord Justice of Appeal, 1982–1986, and Lord of Appeal in Ordinary, 1986–1998
- Robert Armstrong, Baron Armstrong of Ilminster (1927–2020), Permanent Under-Secretary of State for the Home Department, 1977–1979, and Cabinet Secretary, 1979–1987
- John Coldstream (1927–2008), Professor of Aegean Archaeology, King's College London, 1975–1983, and Yates Professor of Classical Art and Archaeology, University College London, 1983–1992
- Peter Dickinson (1927–2015), author
- West de Wend Fenton (1927-2002), adventurer and eccentric
- John Habgood, Baron Habgood (1927–2019), Bishop of Durham, 1973–1983, and Archbishop of York, 1983–1995
- Robin Leigh-Pemberton, Baron Kingsdown (1927–2013), Governor, Bank of England, 1983–1993
- Sir Reresby Sitwell, 7th Baronet (1927–2009)
- Francis Haskell, professor of history of art at Oxford (1928–2000)
- Major General Sir John Acland (1928–2006), General Officer Commanding, South West District, 1978–1981
- John Barton (1928–2018), Associate Director, Royal Shakespeare Company, 1964–1991
- Anthony Blond (1928–2008), publisher
- Alan Clark (1928–1999), politician and diarist
- Sir Angus Ogilvy (1928–2004), husband of Princess Alexandra
- Abdellatief Abouheif (1929–2008), Egyptian swimming champion
- Sir Piers Bengough (1929–2005), The Queen's Representative at Ascot, 1982–1997
- Sir Adrian Cadbury (1929–2015), managing director, 1969–1974, and chairman, 1975–1989, Cadbury Schweppes
- John Julius Cooper, 2nd Viscount Norwich (1929–2018), writer, broadcaster and historian
- Charles Gordon-Lennox, 10th Duke of Richmond (1929–2017), Member of the House of Lords, 1989–1999 Lord Lieutenant of West Sussex, 1990–1994
- John Lawrence, 2nd Baron Oaksey (1929–2012), horseracing commentator and journalist
- Anthony Lloyd, Baron Lloyd of Berwick (1929–2024), Lord Justice of Appeal, 1984–1993, and Lord of Appeal in Ordinary, 1993–1999
- Sebastian Snow (1929–2001), explorer and writer
- Christopher Davidge (1929–2014), Olympic rower and High Sheriff of Northamptonshire
- Jeremy Thorpe (1929–2014), Leader of the Liberal Party, 1967–1976
- Desmond Norman (1929-2002), aircraft designer and businessman
- Philip Ziegler (1929–2023), author and historian

== 1930s ==
- Sir Antony Acland (1930-2021), ambassador to Luxembourg, 1975–1977, Spain, 1977–1979, and the United States, 1986–1991, Permanent Under-Secretary of State for Foreign and Commonwealth Affairs, 1982–1986, and Provost of Eton, 1991–2000
- Antony Armstrong-Jones, 1st Earl of Snowdon (1930–2017), photographer
- Malcolm Erskine, 17th Earl of Buchan (1930-2022)
- Charles A. Burney (1930–2024), archaeologist
- Sir Thomas Hare, 5th Baronet (1930–1993), cricketer
- Julian Haviland (1930–2023), the Political Editor of ITN, 1975–1981, and The Times newspaper, 1981–1986
- Douglas Hurd, Baron Hurd of Westwell (born 1930), Secretary of State for Northern Ireland, 1984–1985, Home Secretary, 1985–1989, and Secretary of State for Foreign and Commonwealth Affairs, 1989–1995
- Sir (Henry) Saxon Tate, 5th Baronet (1931–2012), Tate & Lyle MD and businessman
- Jeremy Sandford (1930–2003), screenwriter
- Julian Slade (1930–2006), author and composer
- Neal Ascherson (born 1932), journalist and author
- Colin Clark (1932–2002), filmmaker
- Tam Dalyell (1932–2017), politician
- Sir Howard Hodgkin (1932–2017), painter
- Rory McEwen (1932–1982), painter
- Teddy Millington-Drake (1932–1994), artist
- Tim Renton (1932-2020), Baron Renton of Mount Harry, Conservative politician
- Sir Jocelyn Stevens (1932–2014), managing director, Evening Standard, 1969–1972, Daily Express, 1972–1974, Beaverbrook Newspapers, 1974–1977, and Express Newspapers, 1977–1981
- Alexander Thynn, 7th Marquess of Bath (1932–2020), owner of Longleat
- Richard Abel Smith (1933–2004), British Army officer
- Jeremy Brett (1933–1995), actor
- Sir James Goldsmith (1933–1997), entrepreneur and politician
- William Goodhart, Baron Goodhart (1933–2017), Liberal Democrat politician and lawyer
- Sir John Gurdon (1933–2025), Fullerian Professor of Physiology and Comparative Anatomy, Royal Institution, 1985–1991, John Humphrey Plummer Professor of Cell Biology, University of Cambridge, 1991–2001, and Master of Magdalene College, Cambridge, 1995–2002, Nobel Prize for Physiology or Medicine winner 2012
- Daniel Massey (1933–1998), actor
- Hugo Anthony Meynell (1936-2021), author, son of Captain Godfrey Meynell
- John Michell (1933–2009), writer on esoterica and sacred geometry
- William Weir, 3rd Viscount Weir (born 1933), merchant banker and chairman of the Weir Group
- Richard Bingham, 7th Earl of Lucan (born 1934)
- John Farmer (born 1934), cricketer
- Reshad Feild (Richard Timothy Feild) (1934–2016)
- Professor Robin Milner (1934–2010), informatician and computer scientist.
- John Standing (born 1934), actor
- Ben Whitaker (1934–2014), author
- Robin Dixon, 3rd Baron Glentoran (born 1935), politician; Olympic Games gold medal winner.
- Prince Edward, Duke of Kent (born 1935)
- Bamber Gascoigne (1935-2022), author and broadcaster
- Michael Holroyd (born 1935), author and biographer
- Peter Palumbo, Baron Palumbo (born 1935), Chairman, Arts Council of Great Britain, 1989–1994
- Andrew Rowe (1935–2008) schoolmaster, civil servant, and member of parliament
- Andrew Sinclair (1935–2019), author and historian
- Alan Montagu-Stuart-Wortley-Mackenzie, 4th Earl of Wharncliffe (1935–1987)
- Admiral of the Fleet Sir Benjamin Bathurst (born 1936), Chief of Fleet Support, 1986–1989, Commander-in-Chief Fleet, 1989–1991, Vice Chief of the Defence Staff, 1991–1993, and First Sea Lord, 1993–1995
- Duff Hart-Davis (1936–2025), author and journalist
- Peter Hill-Wood (1936–2018), Chairman, Arsenal F.C., 1982–2013
- Hugh Hudson (1936–2023), film director
- Jacob Rothschild, 4th Baron Rothschild (1936–2024), investment banker
- David Lytton Cobbold, 2nd Baron Cobbold (1937–2022)
- Charles Douglas-Home (1937–1985), Editor, The Times, 1982–1985
- Sir Arthur Gooch, 14th Baronet (born 1937), soldier
- Derry Moore (born 1937), photographer
- Conrad Russell, 5th Earl Russell (1937–2004), Astor Professor of British History, University College London, 1984–1990, and Professor of British History, King's College London, 1990–2002
- Arthur Gore, 9th Earl of Arran (born 1938), politician
- David Benedictus (1938–2023), writer and director
- Henry Keswick (1938–2024) businessman, industrialist
- Angus Douglas-Hamilton, 15th Duke of Hamilton (1938–2010) premier peer of Scotland
- Christopher Gibbs (1938–2018), art dealer
- Jonathan Riley-Smith (1938–2016), Professor of History, Royal Holloway College, London, 1978–1994, and Dixie Professor of Ecclesiastical History, University of Cambridge, 1994–2011
- Henry Blofeld (born 1939), cricket commentator and journalist
- Jonathan Cecil (1939–2011), actor
- Archibald Montgomerie, 18th Earl of Eglinton (1939–2018)
- Grey Gowrie (1939–2021), politician and arts administrator
- Colin Thubron (born 1939), travel writer and novelist
- Simon Cairns, 6th Earl Cairns (born 1939), businessman
- Timothy Yates (1935–2016), Anglican priest, theologian and historian

== 1940s ==
- Perry Anderson (born 1940), Marxist intellectual and editor of New Left Review
- John Baskervyle-Glegg (1940–2004), British Army general and first-class cricketer
- Sir Dominic Cadbury (born 1940), chief executive, 1984–1993, and chairman, 1993–2000, Cadbury Schweppes, and chairman, Wellcome Trust, 2000–
- Chips Keswick (1940–2024) industrialist
- Christopher Cazenove (1940–2010), actor
- Adrian Hollis (1940–2013), classical scholar and chess grandmaster
- H. Jones (1940–82), Falklands War Victoria Cross
- Sir William Mahon, 7th Baronet (born 1940), soldier
- Tristram Powell (1940–2024), television director
- Prince William of Gloucester (1941–1972)
- Jeremy Clyde (born 1941), actor
- Hugh Cavendish, Baron Cavendish of Furness (born 1941)
- Robert Fellowes, Baron Fellowes (born 1941-2024), Private Secretary to The Queen, 1990–1999
- Heathcote Williams (1941–2017), poet, actor and playwright
- Sir George Young, 6th Baronet (born 1941), Secretary of State for Transport, 1995–1997
- Prince Michael of Kent (born 1942)
- Jonathan Aitken (born 1942), Chief Secretary to the Treasury, 1994–1995, and writer
- Sir Nicholas Bonsor (1942–2023), politician
- Simon Keswick (born 1942), industrialist
- Robert Christie (1942–2012), cricketer
- Sir Andrew Collins (born 1942), High Court judge
- Piers Courage (1942–1970), racing driver
- James Douglas-Hamilton, Baron Selkirk of Douglas (1942–2023), politician and author
- Charles McCreery (born 1942), psychologist and author
- Richard Francis Needham, 6th Earl of Kilmorey (born 1942), politician and businessman
- William Nimmo Smith, Lord Nimmo Smith (born 1942), judge
- Derek Parfit (1942–2017), philosopher
- Malcolm Pearson, Baron Pearson of Rannoch (born 1942), Former Leader of UKIP
- Sir Adam Ridley (born 1942), civil servant and banker
- Hugo Williams (born 1942), writer, critic and poet
- Anthony Cheetham (born 1943), publisher
- Adam Hart-Davis (born 1943), writer and broadcaster
- Ian Ogilvy (born 1943), actor
- Prince Richard, Duke of Gloucester (born 1944)
- Clement von Franckenstein (1944–2019), actor
- Jeremy Child (1944–2022), actor
- Magnus Linklater journalist, writer, and former newspaper editor
- Richard Cory-Wright (born 1944) 4th Baronet Cory-Wright
- Sir Ranulph Fiennes (born 1944), explorer
- Mark Fisher (born 1944), MP
- Peter Morrison (1944–95) Parliamentary Private Secretary (PPS) to former British Prime Minister Margaret Thatcher and MP for Chester from 1974 to 1992
- Danus Skene (1944–2016), Scottish Labour, then Liberal Democrat, and finally SNP politician
- Birendra of Nepal (1945–2001), King of Nepal 1972–2001
- David Calvert-Smith born 1945, English judge
- Robert Carnwath, Lord Carnwath of Notting Hill (born 1945), Justice of the Supreme Court of the United Kingdom, 2012–2020
- Rupert Daniels (born 1945), cricketer
- Charles Wellesley, 9th Duke of Wellington (born 1945), Conservative MEP and Chairman of the Council of King's College London
- Douglas Hogg, 3rd Viscount Hailsham (born 1945), Minister of Agriculture, Fisheries and Food, 1995–1997
- Francis Pryor (born 1945) archeologist, author and broadcaster
- David Jessel (born 1945), television journalist and broadcaster
- Shaun Agar, 6th Earl of Normanton (1945–2019), landowner and powerboat racer
- Sir Francis Richards (born 1945), Director, Government Communications Headquarters, 1998–2003, and Governor of Gibraltar, 2003–
- Nick Pretzlik (1945–2004), cricketer, ski jumper, and philanthropist
- Evelyn Baring, 4th Earl of Cromer (born 1946), banker
- Robert Gascoyne-Cecil, 7th Marquess of Salisbury (born 1946), Lord Privy Seal and Leader of the House of Lords, 1994–1997
- Sir Michael Burton (born 1946), High Court Judge
- Robin Lane Fox (born 1946), Reader in Ancient History, University of Oxford, 1990–
- William Shawcross (born 1946), Chairman of the Charity Commission for England and Wales; writer and broadcaster
- William Waldegrave, Baron Waldegrave of North Hill (born 1946), Secretary of State for Health, 1990–1992, Minister of Agriculture, Fisheries and Food, 1994–95, and Chief Secretary to the Treasury, 1995–1997, Provost of Eton
- Christopher Charles Lyttelton, 12th Viscount Cobham (born 1947), nobleman and financial consultant to Smith and Williamson
- Sir Robert Fulton (born 1948), Governor of Gibraltar and Commandant General Royal Marines
- Hector McDonnell (born 1947), artist and author
- Richard Alston (born 1948), Artistic Director, Ballet Rambert, 1986–1992, and choreographer
- Charles Pepys, 8th Earl of Cottenham (1948–2000), cricketer and equestrian
- Merlin Hay, 24th Earl of Erroll (born 1948), Member of the House of Lords, Chief of the Scottish Clan Hay and Lord High Constable of Scotland
- Jonathan Sumption, Lord Sumption (born 1948), Supreme Court judge and Historian.
- Peter Robert Henry Mond, 4th Baron Melchett (1948–2018), Former Lord in Waiting, Parliamentary Under-Secretary of State and Minister of State.
- Simon Hornblower (born 1949), Professor of Classics and Ancient History, University College London, 1997–
- Richard Jenkyns (born 1949), Professor of the Classical Tradition at Oxford University
- Barry Johnston (born 1949), writer and producer
- Hugh Matheson (rower) (born 1949), British rower and Olympic silver medallist, journalist and author
- William Legge, 10th Earl of Dartmouth (born 1949), UK Independence Party MEP
- David Rendel (1949–2016), Member of Parliament
- John Pawson (born 1949), architect

== 1950s ==
- Edward Bennett (born 1950), television director
- Andrew Douglas-Home (born 1950), Scottish first-class cricketer
- Jonathon Porritt (born 1950), Director, Friends of the Earth, 1984–1990, and Forum for the Future, 1996–, writer and broadcaster
- Michael Hicks Beach, 3rd Earl St Aldwyn (born 1950), business man
- David Tredinnick born 1950, Conservative MP, member of the Health Select Committee and Science and Technology Select Committee, and alternative medicine advocate
- William Astor, 4th Viscount Astor (born 1951), businessman, politician
- John Wodehouse (born 1951), 5th Earl of Kimberley
- Mark Douglas-Home (born 1951), Editor, The Herald, 2000–
- David Maxwell (born 1951), British rower and Olympic silver medallist
- Nick Ormerod (born 1951), stage designer
- S. P. Somtow (born 1952), musical composer and author
- James Arbuthnot (born 1952), politician
- Sir Aubrey Thomas Brocklebank (born 1952), entrepreneur
- Robin Drysdale (born 1952), tennis player, 1977 Australian Open quarter-finalist
- David Gilmour, Baron Gilmour of Craigmillar (born 1952), Scottish historian and author
- Reggie Oliver (born 1952) author
- David Sheepshanks (born 1952) joint-acting Chairman of the Football Association
- Martin Taylor (born 1952), chief executive, Courtaulds Textiles, 1990–1993, and Barclays Bank, 1994–1998, and chairman, W. H. Smith Group, 1999–2003
- Matthew Carr (1953–2011), artist
- Geoffrey Clifton-Brown (born 1953), MP for the Cotswolds
- Robert Harvey (born 1953), author and journalist
- Oliver James (born 1953), psychologist
- Simon Mann (born 1953), soldier and mercenary
- Zera Yacob Amha Selassie (born 1953) Crown Prince of Ethiopia
- John Sinclair, 3rd Viscount Thurso (born 1953) Liberal Democrat politician
- Patrick Stopford, 9th Earl of Courtown (born 1954), politician
- Richard Scott, 10th Duke of Buccleuch (born 1954), aristocrat and landowner
- Peter Ramsauer (born 1954) German Cabinet Minister - Federal Minister of Transport, Building and Urban Development 2009 -
- John Barclay (born 1954), cricketer and cricket manager
- Jamie Borwick, Lord Borwick (born 1955), former chairman, Manganese Bronze Holdings
- Michael Chance (born 1955), counter-tenor
- Robert Currey (born 1955), astrologer
- Charles Gordon-Lennox, Earl of March and Kinrara (born 1955), president, British Automobile Racing Club, founder, Goodwood Festival of Speed
- Francis Grier (born 1955), organist, choir conductor and composer
- Nicky Gumbel (born 1955), priest and religious leader
- Charles Shaughnessy (born 1955), Actor, 5th Baron Shaughnessy (2007– )
- David Profumo (born 1955), author
- James Sassoon, Baron Sassoon (born 1955), businessman and politician
- Bill Turnbull (1956-2022), journalist and television presenter
- David Goodhart, journalist, commentator, author, director of the think tank Demos
- Dominic Lawson (born 1956), Editor, The Spectator, 1990–1995, and The Sunday Telegraph, 1995–
- Oliver Letwin (born 1956), Shadow Home Secretary, 2001–2003, Shadow Chancellor of the Exchequer, 2003–2005, Shadow Secretary of State for Environment, Food and Rural Affairs, 2005, and Chancellor of the Duchy of Lancaster, 2014–2016.
- Mark Lyall Grant (born 1956), diplomat
- Charles Moore (born 1956), Editor, The Spectator, 1984–1990, The Sunday Telegraph, 1990–1995, and The Daily Telegraph, 1995–2003
- Justin Welby (born 1956), Bishop of Durham, 2011–2012; 105th Archbishop of Canterbury, 2013-2025.
- George Herbert, 8th Earl of Carnarvon (born November 1956) aristocrat and landowner
- Geoffrey Adams (born 1957), diplomat
- Sir Nicholas Coleridge (born 1957), Editor, Harpers and Queen, 1986–1989, and President, Condé Nast Publications, 1992–2019. Chair, Victoria and Albert Museum 2015-2023, Platinum Jubilee Pageant, 2021-22.
- Sir Thomas Hughes-Hallett (born 1954), British barrister, investment banker and philanthropy executive
- Pico Iyer (born 1957), author
- Adam Nicolson (born 1957), author
- Andrew Robinson (born 1957), Literary Editor, Times Higher Education Supplement, and writer
- Robin Birley (born 1958), businessman
- Richard Graham (born 1958), politician
- Sir Richard Pease, 4th Baronet (born 1958), fund manager
- Matt Ridley, 5th Viscount Ridley (born 1958), zoologist
- Hugo Guinness (born 1959), artist and writer
- Hugh Laurie (born 1959), actor and comedian
- Nicholas Macpherson (born 1959), Permanent Secretary to the Treasury
- John Rawlinson (born 1959), cricketer and artist
- Rupert Soames (born 1959), industrialist, CEO Aggreko
- Hugo Swire (born 1959), Minister of State, Northern Ireland
- Stephen Wolfram (born 1959), physicist and computer scientist

== 1960s ==
- Robert Hanson (born 1960), financier
- Charlie Brooks (born 1963), racehorse trainer
- Johnnie Boden (born 1961), internet entrepreneur, founder of Boden catalogue
- Jesse Norman, Conservative politician
- Roland Watson, journalist
- Edmund Pery, 7th Earl of Limerick (born 1963)
- Geordie Greig (born 1960), editor, The Mail on Sunday
- Julian Nott (born 1960), film composer
- Martin Fiennes, 22nd Baron Saye and Sele (born 1961), venture capitalist
- Alex Renton (born 1961), journalist and author
- Alex Wilmot-Sitwell (born 1961), co-chairman & CEO, UBS Investment Bank
- Nick Hurd (born 1962), politician
- Nigel Oakes (born 1962), businessman
- Alexander Cameron (1963-2023), barrister
- Rupert Goodman DL (born 1963), publisher
- Sir Timothy Gowers (born 1963), Rouse Ball Professor of Mathematics, University of Cambridge, 1995–
- Tom Hammick (born 1963), painter
- Patrick Hennessy, Deputy Director of Communications for the Labour Party
- Jay Jopling (born 1963), art dealer
- José Manuel Entrecanales (born 1963), chairman of Acciona
- James Palumbo (born 1963), club owner, founder of the Ministry of Sound
- Harry Rawlinson (1963–2011), cricketer
- Marcus Armytage (born 1964), National Hunt jockey, Grand National winner, Daily Telegraph racing correspondent
- Simon Bowthorpe (born 1964), chief executive, Media Force One
- Boris Johnson (born 1964), Prime Minister of the United Kingdom 2019–2022, and former Mayor of London
- Richard Farnes (born 1964), music director, Opera North
- Darius Guppy (born 1964), criminal
- Charles Spencer, 9th Earl Spencer (born 1964), formerly Charles, Viscount Althorp
- Cornelius Lysaght (born 1965), horseracing broadcaster
- Paul Watkins (born 1964), novelist
- Abhisit "Mark" Vejjajiva (born 1964), 27th Prime Minister of Thailand
- Nicholas Wheeler (born 1965), Entrepreneur, founder of Charles Tyrwhitt
- Hugh Fearnley-Whittingstall (born 1965), chef, writer and television presenter
- James Wood (born 1965), literary critic
- Benedict Rattigan (born 1965), writer and philosopher
- Giles Andreae (born 1966), author
- Sebastian James (born 1966), chief executive, Boots UK
- Bill Wiggin (born 1966), Member of Parliament
- David Cameron (born 1966), Prime Minister of the United Kingdom 2010–2016
- Edward Llewellyn, Baron Llewellyn of Steep (born 1966), Conservative Central Office
- Anthony Loyd (born 1966), journalist and author
- Nicholas Rowe (born 1966), actor
- Ed Shearmur (born 1966), film composer
- Stephen Layton (born 1966), conductor
- David Runciman (born 1967), Professor of Politics, Cambridge University
- George Bingham, 8th Earl of Lucan (born 1967), peer
- Thomas Cholmondeley (1968–2016), Anglo-Kenyan farmer
- Brent Hoberman (born 1968), chief executive, Lastminute.com, 1998–
- Atticus Ross (born 1968), composer, Academy Award winner
- Clifton Wrottesley, 14th Baronet, 6th Baron Wrottesley (born 1968), Irish Olympian and Cresta Run rider
- William Fox-Pitt (born 1969), three-day eventing rider
- James Landale (born 1969), journalist
- James Owen (born 1969), author and journalist
- Sir Jacob Rees-Mogg (born 1969), Member of Parliament
- Boris Starling (born 1969), novelist
- Dominic West (born 1969), actor
- Nicholas Rowe (born 1966), actor
- William Sitwell (born 1969) journalist, food critic

== 1970s ==
- George Bridges, Baron Bridges of Headley (born 1970), politician
- Will Keen (born 1970), actor
- Sir Matthew Pinsent (born 1970), oarsman
- Henry Dimbleby (born 1970) food writer and businessman
- Sebastian Doggart (born 1970), film director and journalist
- Conrad Wolfram (born 1970), technologist
- Chris Rokos (born 1970), hedge fund manager
- William Fiennes (born 1970), author
- David Watson (born 1970), record producer
- King Dipendra of Nepal (1971–2001), briefly King of Nepal, 2001
- Charles Cumming (born 1971), novelist
- Jo Johnson (born 1971), Conservative MP for Orpington & Number 10 Policy Chief
- Damian Lewis (born 1971), actor
- Nathaniel Rothschild, 5th Baron Rothschild (born 1971), financier
- Jeremy Sheldon (born 1971), author
- Guy Walters (born 1971), novelist and journalist
- Hugh Crossley, 4th Baron Somerleyton (born 1971), restaurateur and hotel owner
- Oliver Dimsdale (born 1972), actor
- Ewan Birney (born 1972), scientist
- Peter Morgan (born 1972), cricketer
- Christopher de Bellaigue, writer, born 1973
- Oliver Milburn (born 1973), actor
- Rory Stewart (born 1973), explorer, writer and Member of Parliament
- Tom Parker Bowles (born 1974), food writer (book, newspaper, magazine) and food programme television presenter, son of Queen Camilla
- Will Adamsdale (born 1974), actor
- James Archer (born 1974), stock trader
- Bear Grylls (born 1974), mountaineer, motivational speaker, and writer
- Danny Kruger (born 1974), politician
- Alexander Windsor, Earl of Ulster (born 1974), son of Prince Richard, Duke of Gloucester
- Dominic Cazenove (born 1975), actor
- Ed Coode (born 1975), oarsman
- Edward Gardner (conductor) (born 1975), music director, English National Opera
- Zac Goldsmith (born 1975), politician
- Kwasi Kwarteng (born 1975), Conservative MP and historian
- Alexander Nix (born 1975), former CEO of Cambridge Analytica
- Julian Ovenden (born 1975), actor and singer
- Ben Elliot (born 1975), English businessman, nephew of Queen Camilla
- Tobias Beer (born 1976), actor
- Alexander Fiske-Harrison (born 1976), actor and writer
- Khalid bin Bandar Al Saud (born 1977), Saudi Ambassador to the United Kingdom
- Justin Gayner (born 1977), businessman
- Andrew Lindsay (born 1977), oarsman
- Prince Nirajan of Nepal (1977–2001)
- Rupert Harrison (born 1978), Economic Advisor to the Treasury
- Richard Mason (born 1978), novelist
- Douglas Murray (born 1979), author
- James Bruce (born 1979), cricketer
- Marius Stravinsky (born 1979), conductor
- Nicholas Ashley-Cooper, 12th Earl of Shaftesbury (born 1979), British peer and philanthropist
- Alexander Gilkes (born 1979), co-founder of online auction house Paddle8
- William Sackville, Lord Buckhurst (born 1979), banker

== 1980s ==
- Nick Eziefula (born 1980), singer-songwriter
- Iain Hollingshead (born 1980), writer
- Alex Payne (born 1980), television presenter
- Alex Loudon (born 1980), England and Warwickshire cricketer
- Simon Woods (born 1980), actor
- Ben Goldsmith (born 1981), businessman and environmentalist
- Harry Hadden-Paton (born 1981), actor
- Nyasha Hatendi (born 1981), actor and producer
- Tom Hiddleston (born 1981), actor
- Sam Hoare (born 1981), actor
- Frank Turner (born 1981), singer-songwriter
- Charles Innes-Ker, 11th Duke of Roxburghe (born 1981)
- Sebastian Armesto (born 1982), actor
- William, Prince of Wales (born 1982)
- Humphrey Ker (born 1982), comedian, writer and actor
- Eddie Redmayne (born 1982), actor
- Ivo Stourton, (born 1982), author and solicitor
- Rakhil Fernando (born 1982), tech entrepreneur
- Nicholas Collon, (born 1983), conductor
- Adetomiwa Edun, (born 1983), actor
- Harry Lloyd (born 1983), actor
- James Sherlock (born 1983), pianist
- James Dacre (born 1984), theatre, opera and film director
- Prince Harry, Duke of Sussex (born 1984)
- Tom Kingsley (born 1985), TV and film director
- Bim Afolami (born 1986), Conservative Politician and MP
- Alex Ball (born 1986), cricketer
- Tom Lyon (real name Richard Jones) (born 1986), escapologist and magician
- Drummond Money-Coutts (born 1986), conjuror
- Oliver Proudlock (born 1986), fashion designer & model
- Charlie Siem (born 1986), contemporary violinist and model
- Tom Palmer (born 1987), comedian and actor
- Tom Stourton (born 1987), comedian and actor
- James Macadam (born 1988), cricketer
- Spencer Matthews (born 1988), reality television personality
- Marius Ostrowski (born 1988), academic and author
- Edward Windsor, Lord Downpatrick (born 1988), fashion designer
- Max Pirkis (born 1989), actor
- Ben Lamb (born 1989), actor
- Alex Hua Tian (born 1989), Olympic equestrian

== 1990s ==
- Sir Lawrence Clarke (born 1990), 110m hurdler
- Ivo Graham (born 1990), comedian
- Lord Max Percy (born 1990), financial analyst
- Alex Stobbs (born 1990), British musician
- Constantine Louloudis (born 1991), British rower and Olympic gold medallist
- Will Vanderspar (born 1991), English cricketer
- Kanes Sucharitakul (born 1992), Thai alpine skier
- Joe Armon-Jones (born 1993), British jazz musician
- Parit Wacharasindhu (born 1993), Thai politician and businessman
- Parker Liautaud (born 1994), polar adventurer and environmental campaigner
- Jonah Hauer-King (born 1995), actor, World on Fire
- Samuel Chatto (born 1996), grandson of Princess Margaret
- Jack Rogers (born 1998), English cricketer
- Tade Ojora (born 1999), 110m hurdler
- Arthur Chatto (born 1999), member of the Royal Family and personal trainer

== See also ==
- List of Old Etonians born before the 18th century
- List of Old Etonians born in the 18th century
- List of Old Etonians born in the 19th century
- List of King's Scholars
