= QF 3.7-inch mountain howitzer =

Ordnance QF 3.7 inch mountain howitzer
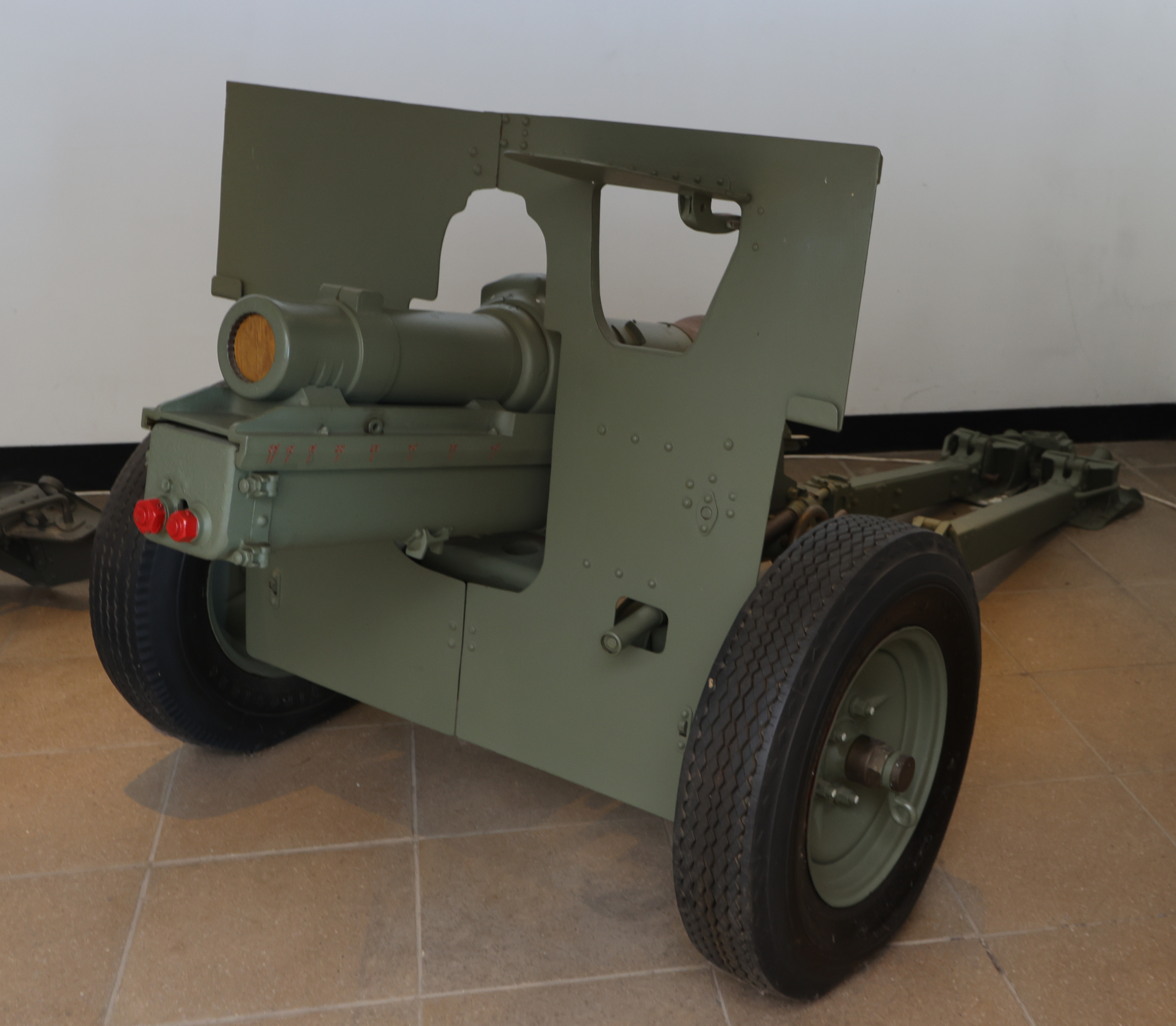
- A 3.7-inch QF mountain gun.
- Type: Mountain gun
- Place of origin: United Kingdom

Service history
- In service: 1917–Present
- Used by: Nepal (The Nepalese Army still has 90-100 in Service)
- Wars: First World War; Second World War; First Arab-Israeli War; First Indochina War; Indo-Pakistani War of 1965; Indo-Pakistani War of 1971; Bangladesh Liberation War

Production history
- Produced: 1915–?

Specifications
- Mass: 1,610 lb (730 kg)
- Barrel length: 3 ft 7.5 in (1.10 m)
- Shell: Separate-loading QF; 94 x 92 mm R
- Shell weight: 20 lb (9.1 kg) HE, Shrapnel, Smoke, Star shell, HEAT
- Calibre: 3.7 in (94 mm)
- Recoil: Hydro-pneumatic, variable, 17.5–35 inch
- Carriage: Wheeled, split trail
- Elevation: −5° to +40°
- Traverse: 20° L & R
- Muzzle velocity: 973 ft/s (297 m/s)
- Maximum firing range: 5,900 yd (5,400 m)

Ordnance, QF 3.7-inch howitzer is a mountain gun, used by British and Commonwealth armies in the First and Second World Wars, and between the wars.

== History ==
The British Indian Army first requested a modern mountain gun in 1906 to replace the BL 10 pounder Mountain Gun, which had been hastily developed after the Second Boer War, but had several shortcomings. In particular, the shell weight was seen as too light, and the gun lacked any recoil absorber or recuperator, meaning the gun had to be relaid after every shell was fired. However, financial constraints delayed production of the 3.7-inch weapon until 1915. As a stop-gap, the barrel of the 10-pounder gun was mounted on an updated carriage to produce the 2.75 inch Mountain Gun.

=== First World War ===
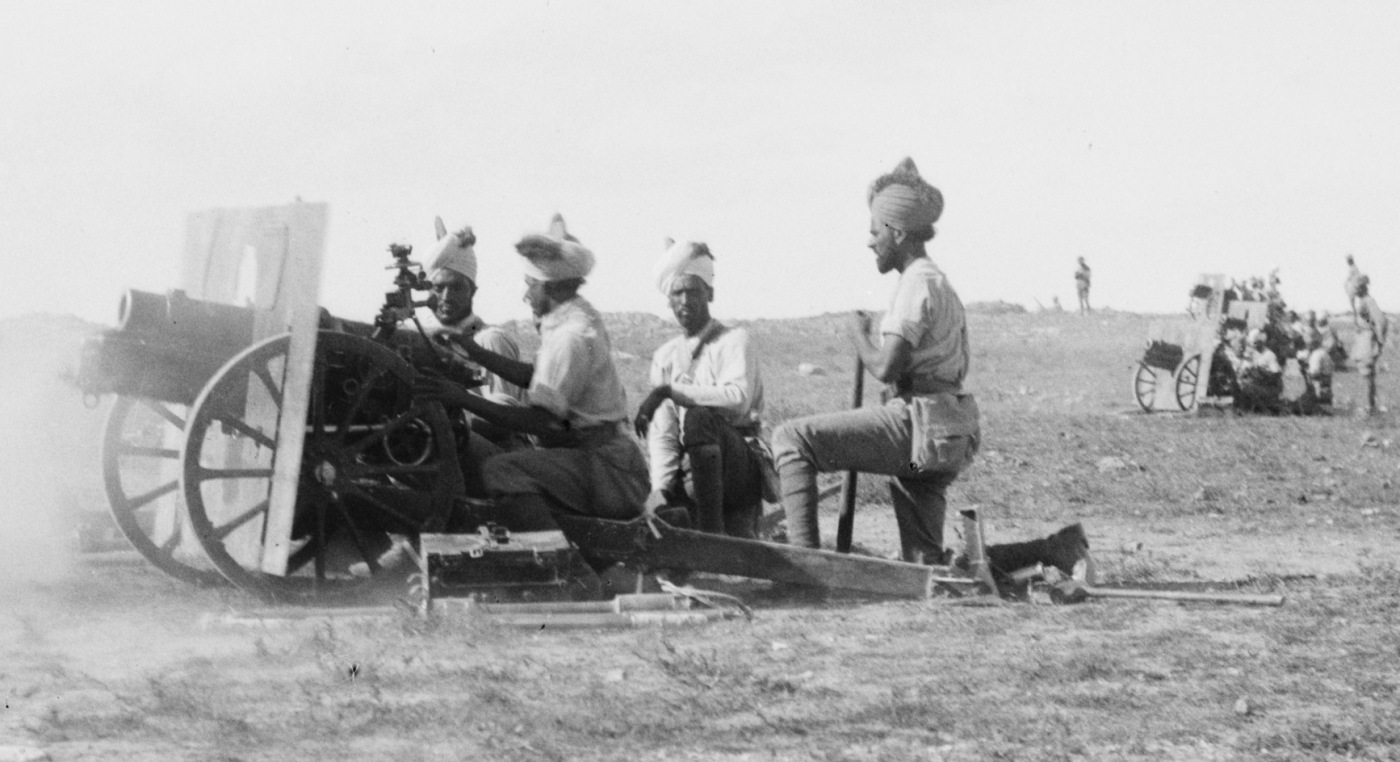
Indian Army battery, probably 39th, at Jerusalem, December 1917

The 3.7-inch howitzer was first introduced in 1917, and was used in action in that year in the Mesopotamian Campaign (modern Iraq area).

The 22nd (Derajat) Indian Frontier Force mountain battery arrived in the East Africa campaign on 18 December 1916, when they relieved the 28th Battery which returned to India. They appear to have re-equipped from the 10-pounder mountain gun to the 3.7-inch howitzer while in East Africa, and first used the new weapon in action in an attack on German positions at Medo, 11 April 1918.

=== Interwar years ===
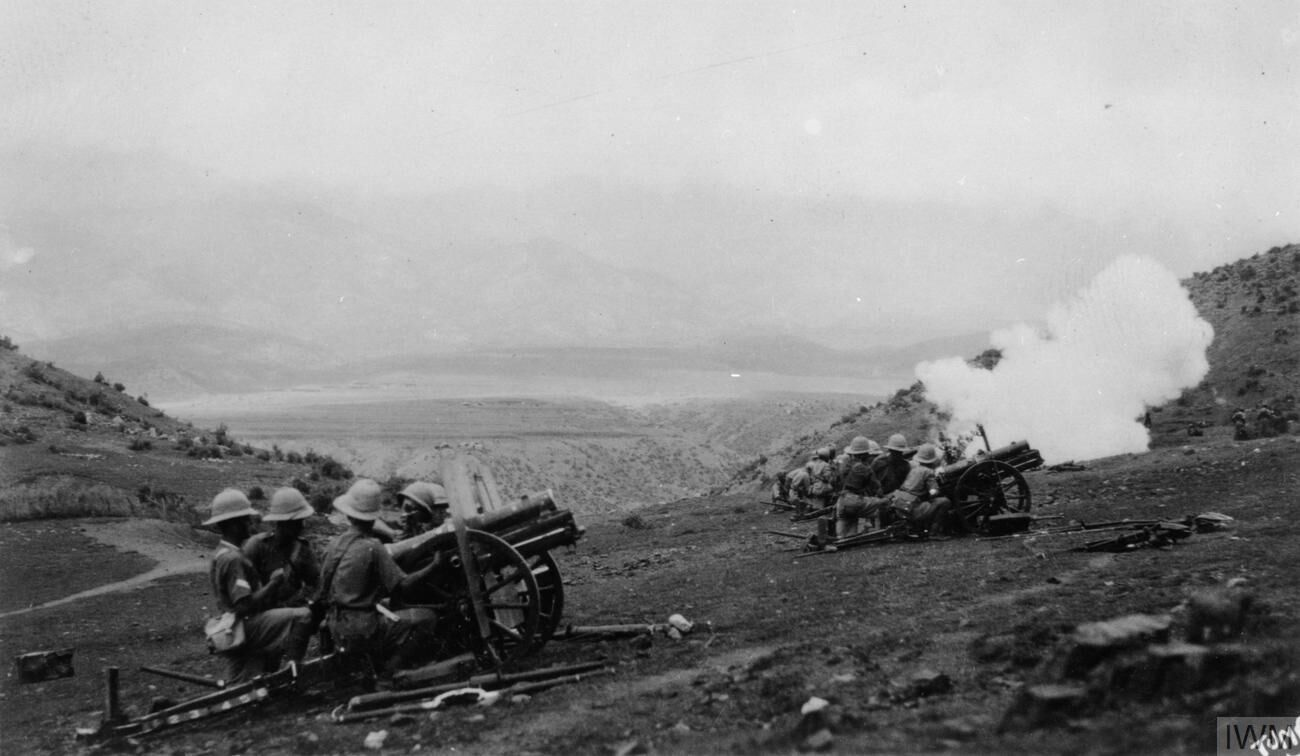
Indian gun crew firing, India, circa. 1930

The 3.7-inch howitzer superseded the 2.75-inch mountain gun following the First World War. It was used by mountain artillery regiments of the Royal Artillery and the Indian Artillery, and saw much service on the North West Frontier of India between the wars.

=== Second World War ===
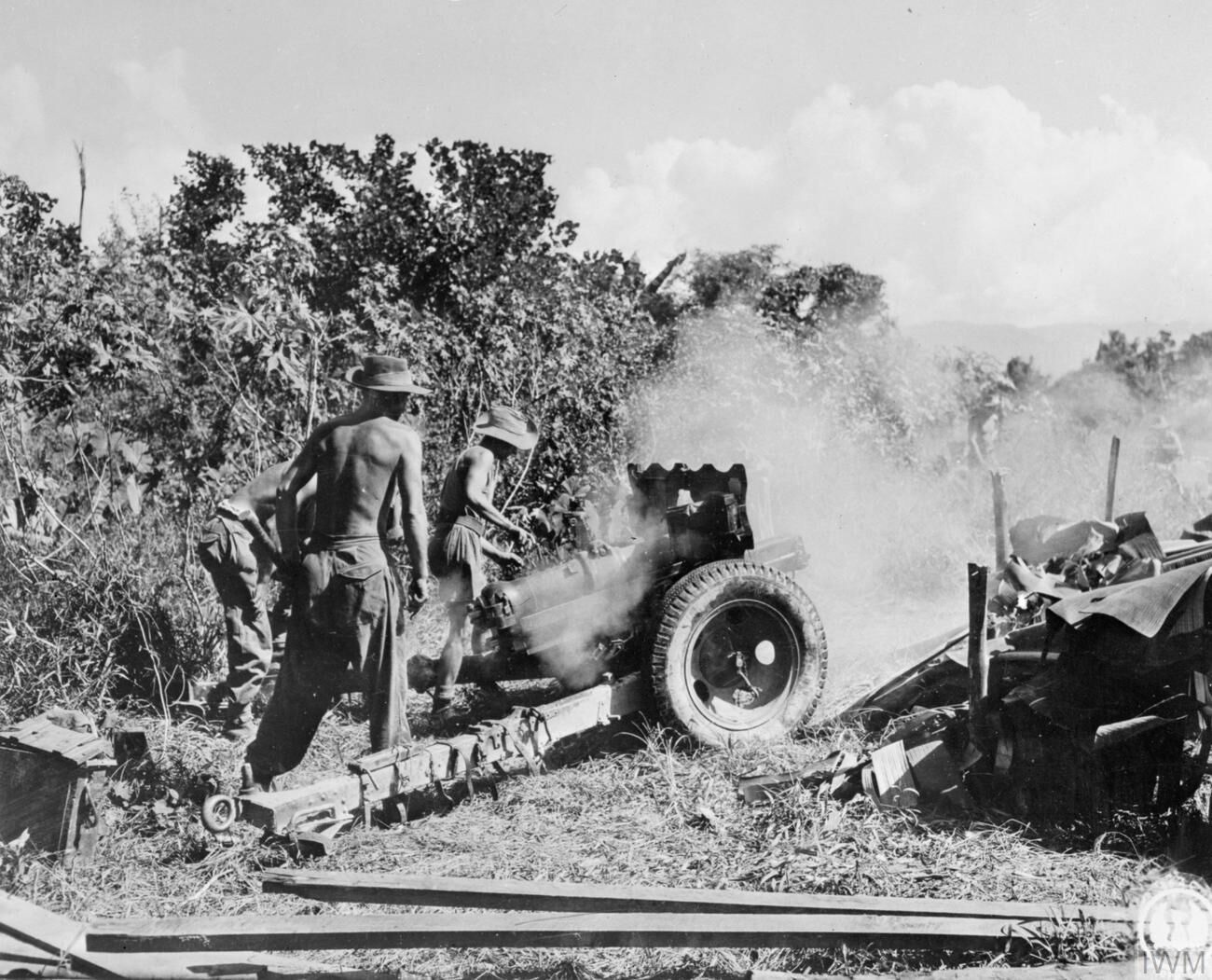
In action in Burma, 3 November 1944

During the Second World War, the weapon equipped artillery units engaged in the North African Campaign (Tunisia), the Italian Campaign, the Kokoda Campaign, and Burma Campaign, and was also used in the Netherlands and Ruhr fighting in 1944–45 by units originally destined for mountain warfare in Greece. In the latter theatre, on occasion the gun was dismantled and manually hauled up to the upper floors of buildings to provide close support in urban fighting. A lightened version was used briefly by airborne formations. Several were supplied to the French Army after 1945; one is on display at the Vietnam Army Museum in Hanoi while another is displayed at the Zone 5 Military Museum, Danang. It was also used on Close Support versions of the A9 and A10 Cruiser Tanks in place of the standard 2 pounder, though mostly to fire smoke shells.

During the war the gun, and its ammunition, were also manufactured in other Commonwealth countries, including South Africa, by the ISCOR (Iron and Steel Corporation of South Africa), and India. South Africa also produced modified versions of the gun.

The gun was finally declared obsolete by the British Army in 1960, although it had not seen service since 1945.

=== Post War ===
After the war, the gun was used by French forces during the First Indochina War and by India during the Indo-Pakistani wars of 1965 and 1971. The "Mujib Battery" of Bangladesh used this gun in 1971's Bangladesh Liberation War. They were provided by India to the Mukti Bahini.

== Details ==
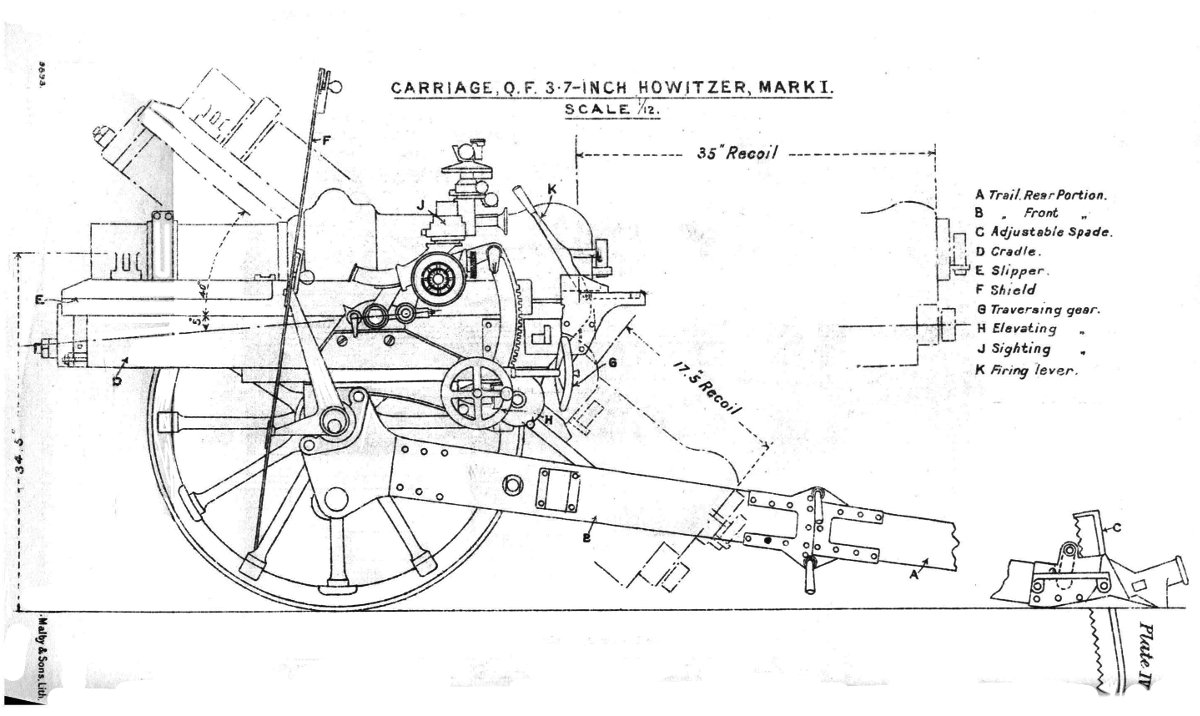
QF 3.7-inch howitzer left elevation diagram.

The weapon was designed to be broken into eight mule loads, for transport over difficult terrain. The heaviest single section is the interrupted screw breech, which weighs 247 pounds (112 kg). Given an open gun position, a practised crew could have the guns unloaded from the mules, reassembled and deployed ready for action in about two minutes. The 3.7-inch howitzer's adjustable suspension system allowed it to be deployed on almost any position, even those too uneven or with too steep a gradient to allow field artillery to be sited. The process of removing the howitzer from a position and reloading it onto the gun mules involved much more lifting and securing loads than deploying it, but could be accomplished in three minutes in favourable conditions.

The howitzer has a split trail, the first British weapon to do so, which allows firing at very high angles (a useful feature in mountainous terrain). It also has a large rectangular shield to protect the crew from small-arms fire, but this was often omitted to save weight. When it was first introduced, the howitzer had two wooden wheels and was light enough be towed by two horses. Later marks have pneumatic tyres and could be towed by any light vehicle, such as the Bren Carrier or jeep.

The propellant casing had five "charge zones", but HE was restricted to no more than "charge four", to prevent premature detonation of the shell. The Australian Army did employ charge five in Papua New Guinea in emergencies – the gun crews referred to it as "O'Hara's charge".

== Ammunition ==
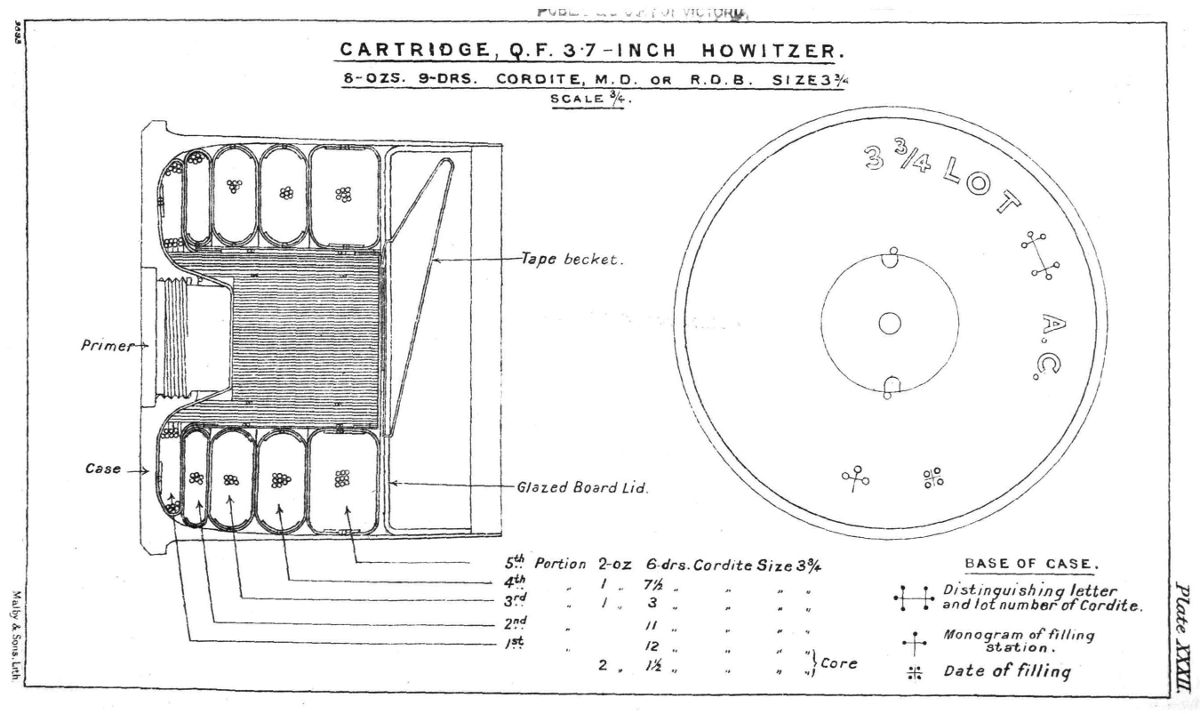
8 oz 9 dram cordite cartridge

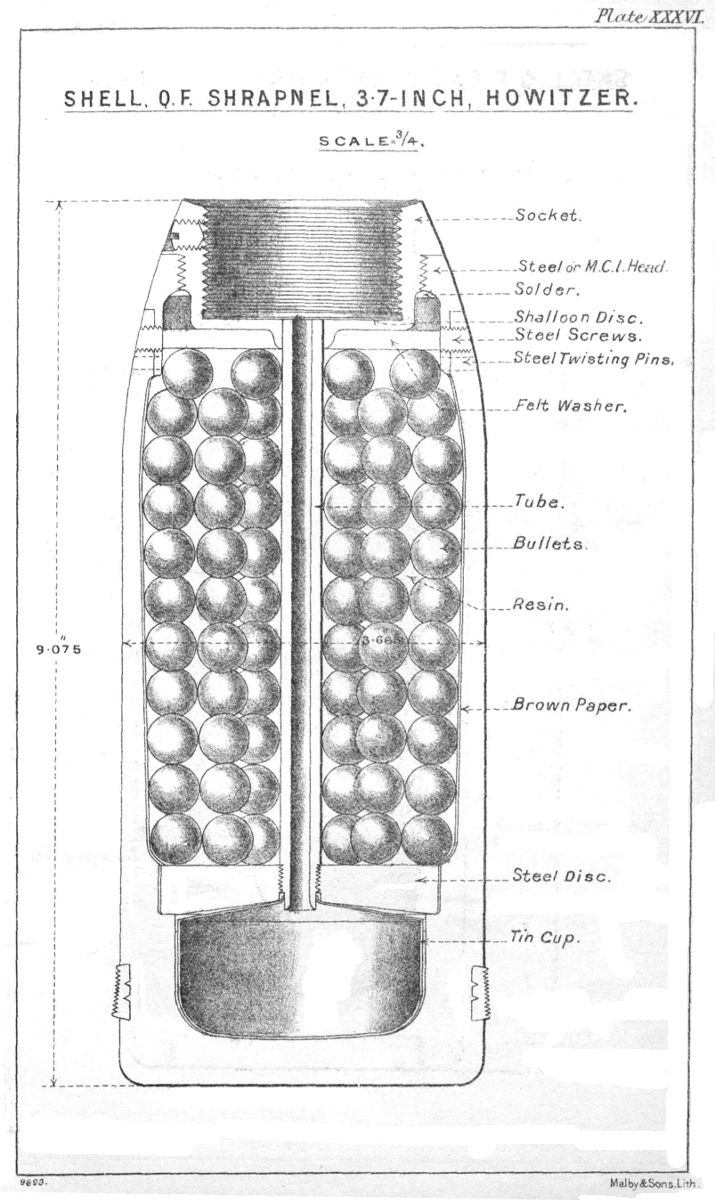
Shrapnel shell

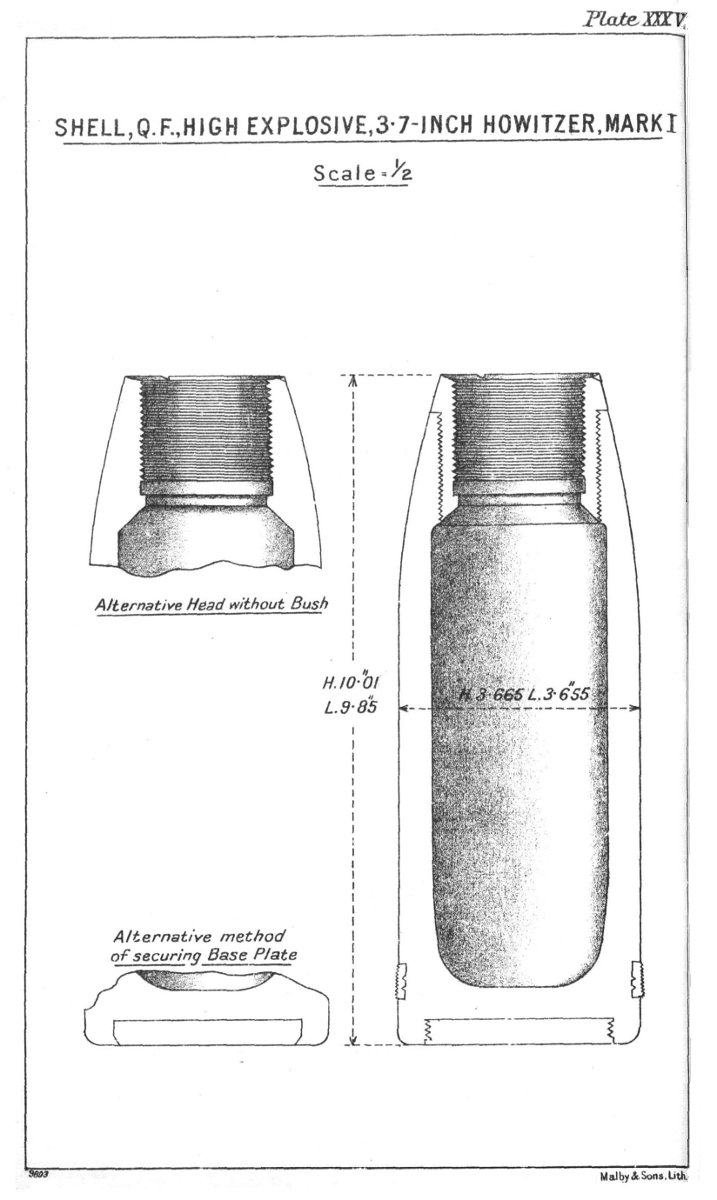
Mark I HE shell

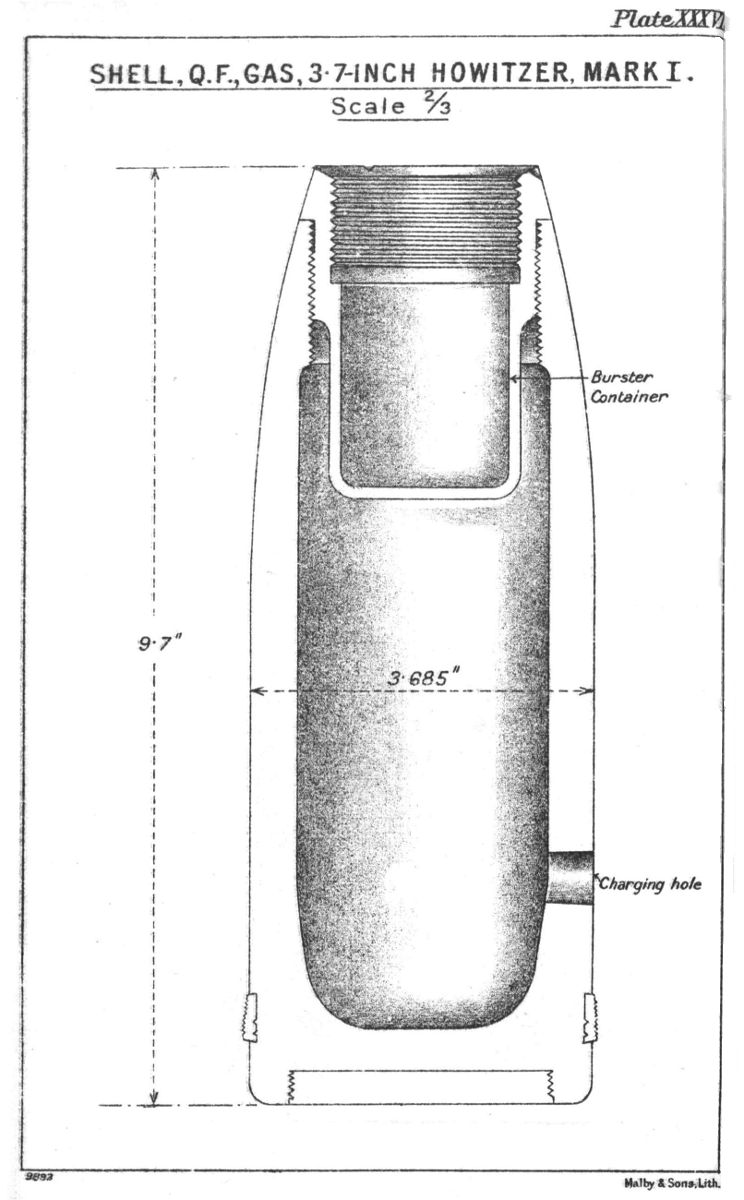
Mark I gas shell

== See also ==
- List of mountain artillery

== Surviving examples ==
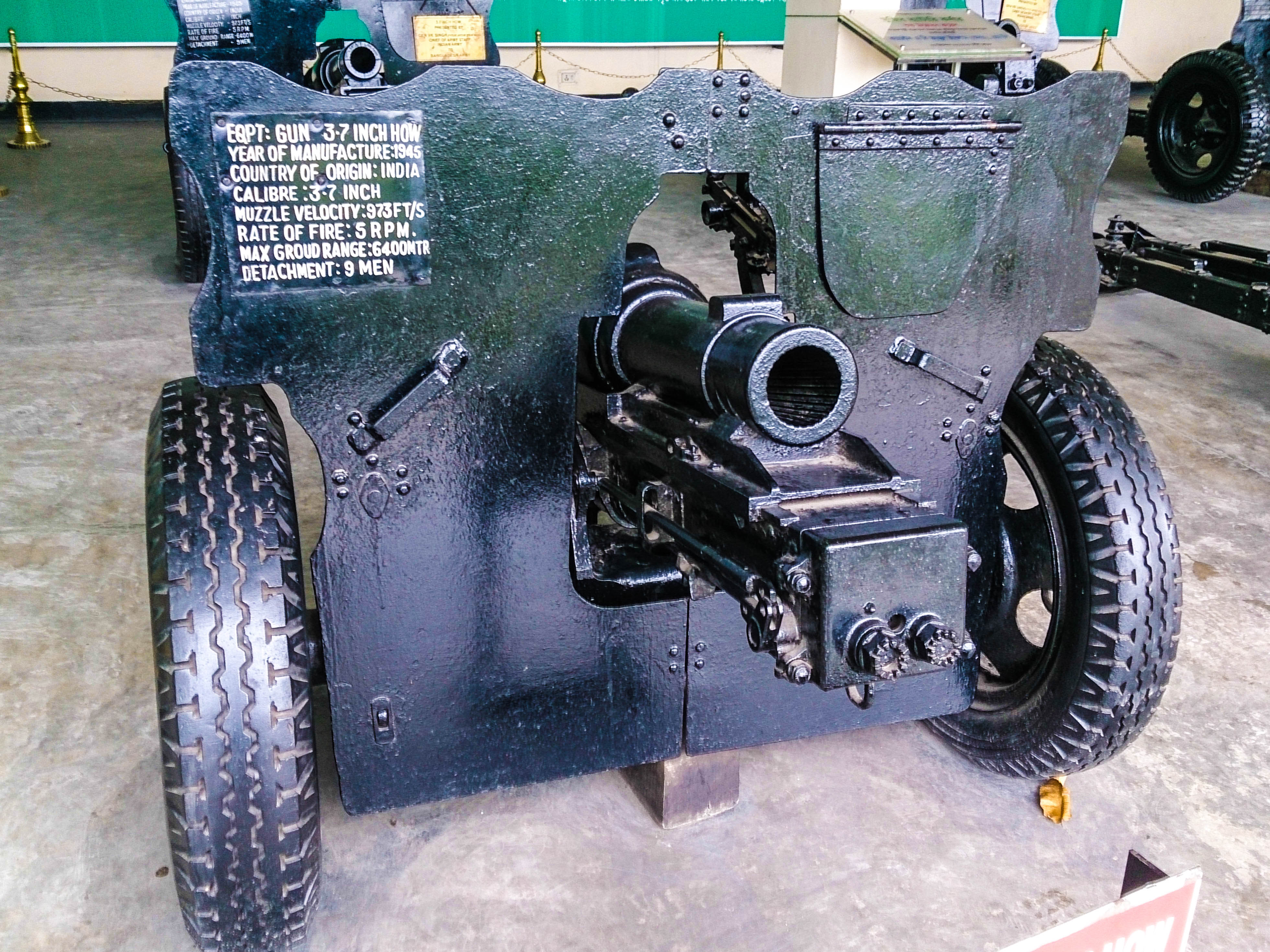
QF 3.7-inch mountain howitzer at Bangladesh Military Museum used by "Mujib Battery" in 1971 Bangladesh Liberation War.

- Royal Artillery Museum, Woolwich, London
- 1942 Mk I Barrel on Mk II Carriage, at Imperial War Museum Duxford, UK.
- Bangladesh Military Museum, Dhaka
- Israel Defense Forces History Museum (Batey ha-Osef Museum), Tel Aviv
- Army Memorial Museum, Waiouru, New Zealand
- Vietnam Army Museum, Hanoi
- Zone 5 Military Museum, Danang
- The War Museum of Athens
- Example at GEM Homes, Johannesburg South Africa, to be restored shortly (pictures to follow)
- Example at Lenz Military Base, Johannesburg, South Africa, to be restored soon. (pictures to follow)
- Outside the Military Police Brigade HQ at Camp Cropper Iraq. (as of Jun 2008)

== Bibliography ==
- Farndale, General Sir Martin (1988). History of the Royal Regiment of Artillery. The Forgotten Fronts and the Home Base, 1914-18. London: The Royal Artillery Institution. ISBN 978-1-870114-05-9.
- Hogg, Ian V.; Thurston, L.F. (1972). British Artillery Weapons & Ammunition 1914 – 1918. London: Ian Allan. ISBN 978-0-7110-0381-1.
- Gower, S. N. (1981). Guns of the Regiment. Canberra: Australian War Memorial. ISBN 978-0-642-89688-9.
