= Giles Daniels =

English cricketer

Personal information
- Full name: John Giles Upton Daniels
- Born: 25 January 1942; Birmingham, Warwickshire, England
- Died: 8 March 2025 (aged 83)
- Batting: Right-handed
- Relatives: Rupert Daniels (brother)

Domestic team information
- Years: Team
- 1964: Combined Services
- 1964: Gloucestershire

Career statistics
Competition	First-class
Matches	2
Runs scored	51
Batting average	12.75
100s/50s	0/0
Top score	22
Balls bowled	–
Wickets	–
Bowling average	–
5 wickets in innings	–
10 wickets in match	–
Best bowling	–
Catches/stumpings	1/–
- Source: Cricinfo, 30 July 2011

John Giles Upton Daniels (25 January 1942 – 8 March 2025) was an English cricketer. Daniels was a right-handed batsman. He was born in Birmingham, Warwickshire and educated at Winchester College, where he represented the college cricket team.

Daniels entered the Royal Armoured Corps with the rank of second lieutenant in 1961. He later made his only first-class cricket appearance for Gloucestershire against Oxford University in 1964. In this match, he scored 15 runs in Gloucestershire's first-innings, before being dismissed by Ted Fillary, while in their second-innings he was dismissed for 4 runs by Tim Razzall. In 1964, he made a single first-class appearance for the Combined Services against Oxford University. He scored 10 runs in the Combined Services first-innings, before being dismissed by John Martin, while in their second-innings he was dismissed for 22 runs by Tim Razzall. Daniels held the rank of lieutenant in the Royal Armoured Corps in 1965, however on 15 April 1967 he resigned his commission.

His brother, Rupert, played first-class cricket for Oxford University. Daniels and his brother ran a company called Edgbarne Trust Limited, based in Cheltenham, Gloucestershire until the time of his death. Giles Daniels died on 8 March 2025, at the age of 83.
