= Ranjit Fernando =

Sri Lankan cricketer (born 1944)

Personal information
- Full name: Edward Ranjit Fernando
- Born: 22 February 1944 (age 82); Colombo, British Ceylon
- Batting: Right-handed
- Role: Wicketkeeper

International information
- National side: Sri Lanka
- ODI debut (cap 2): 7 June 1975 v West Indies
- Last ODI: 14 June 1975 v Pakistan

Career statistics
Competition	ODI	FC
Matches	3	38
Runs scored	47	1,349
Batting average	15.66	22.11
100s/50s	0/0	0/5
Top score	22	81
Catches/stumpings	0/0	50/15
- Source: Cricinfo, 24 February 2017

Edward Ranjit Fernando (born 22 February 1944) is a former Sri Lankan cricketer who played three One Day Internationals, all of which were during the 1975 Cricket World Cup during which he was the wicket-keeper and opening batsman. In September 2018, he was one of 49 former Sri Lankan cricketers felicitated by Sri Lanka Cricket, to honour them for their services before Sri Lanka became a full member of the International Cricket Council (ICC). He is married to Sri Lankan entrepreneur Ramani Fernando and they have four children, Rashika Fernando, Rishen Fernando, Rehan Fernando and Rakhil Fernando.

== Early career ==
He started playing first eleven school cricket at St. Benedict's College, Colombo, in 1960 and was a leading schoolboy cricketer in his time being amongst the best wicket keeper - batsman. He was adjudged the Schoolboy Cricketer of the Year in 1964.

== Domestic career ==
Almost straight from school he was picked to tour India with the Ceylon team in 1964 under Michael Tissera. Although he didn't play in the unofficial tests, Ceylon beat India in the third unofficial test which was the country's first major victory overseas. He was selected to tour England with the Ceylon team in 1968, but the tour was cancelled just before it was due to begin.

He won his first test (unofficial) Cap against Colin Cowdrey's England touring team in an unofficial test match in 1969 and since then played representatively for Ceylon/ Sri Lanka in unofficial tests and ODI both at home and abroad regularly, until retiring in 1979.

He represented the Nondescripts Cricket Club from 1963 to 1979 and played in the Premier Division for an unbroken period of 16 years, captaining the club to many championship titles.

== Beyond cricket ==
Having qualified as an Advanced Coach in 1982 with the National Cricket Association in England he served as one of the National coaches in Sri Lanka as soon as Sri Lanka was admitted as a full member of the ICC and was also instrumental in setting up a structured National Coaching Plan in the country.

He toured with the Sri Lanka team, on its first official test tour as Assistant Manager handling the cricket aspects of the tour and continued to serve in national team management capacities from time to time for a number of years, juggling assignments with his own business responsibilities. He served on the executive committee of the Board of Control for Cricket in Sri Lanka for 12 consecutive years, serving on the Coaching Committee for most of the time. He worked tirelessly concentrating on the aspects of fielding, and Sri Lanka's consistent development in fielding standards, even up to the winning of the World Cup in 1996 is attributed to his efforts.

He also served as the Executive Secretary (Voluntary) of the Sri Lanka Cricket Foundation which was set up to support the needs of cricket in Sri Lanka, in keeping with its newly acquired status as a full member of the ICC. He succeeded the first Executive Secretary Mahinda Wijesinghe and conducted the affairs of the organization for three years. He also served as a National Selector from 1983 to 1988, and also in 2011, and was on the ICC Cricket Committee for a period, representing Sri Lanka.

Having been introduced to television cricket commentary initially at the Cricketers Benevolent Fund Series (CBFS) in Sharjah, Ranjit Fernando has been the voice of Sri Lanka Cricket working as a TV commentator on almost all Sri Lankan series and other international engagements for a long time.

He is currently a member of Coaching Committee of Sri Lanka Cricket. In 2025, his alma matar, St Benedict's Collage named an annual cricket fixture against St. Peter's Collage in his honour, Kumar Boralessa-Ranjit Fernando Trophy.
