= Mohmand campaign of 1935 =

Anglo-Afghan conflict in the North West Frontier

Second Mohmand campaign
- Part of the Anglo-Afghan wars
Date	August – October, 1935
Location	Peshawar border of the North West Frontier, modern day Pakistan
Result	Revolt suppressed

Belligerents
Mohmand; Supported by:	(United Kingdom) British Army: India

Commanders and leaders
Haji of Turangzai	(United Kingdom) Claude Auchinleck

Units involved
Royal Afghan Army	Royal Air Force

Strength
Mohmand: Unknown; 1,000 soldiers	5,000

The Second Mohmand campaign of 1935 was a British military campaign against the Mohmand tribes in the Northwest Frontier area of British India, now Pakistan. The campaign began in August 1935 where Tanks were used, their first operational use in India, and with help from the Royal Air Force the revolt was suppressed and the Mohmands submitted in October 1935.

== Background ==
The Mohmand are a Pashtun hill tribe who lived north-west of Peshawar in the Mohmand Agency, North-West Frontier Province of British India; now Khyber Pakhtunkhwa, Pakistan. They moved annually across the border to the hills of Afghanistan to escape the summer heat; the border was delineated by the Durand Line in 1893 but was poorly defined.

The First Mohmand campaign in 1897–98 followed earlier military expeditions in 1851–1852, 1854, 1864, 1879, 1880. After the First Mohmand campaign, there was the Mohmand expedition of 1908 and the Mohmand and Bajaur operations of 1933, taking about a month in August.

In 1935 the Mohmand, influenced by the Haji of Turangzai and his three sons the Badshah Guls, were marauding in the plains. At the end of July about 2000 tribesmen were disrupting working parties repairing the Mohinand–Gandab road.

== Campaign ==
The Government decided to send a sizeable punitive force against them, called the Mohmand Force or Mohforce. The force, mobilised by 17 August, included the Nowshera and Peshawar Brigades of the Indian Army, a section of the Royal Tank Corps, the 18th King Edward's Own Cavalry, and the 22nd Derajat Mountain Battery (Frontier Force), with air support from the Indian Wing commanded by Basil Embry. The commanders of the Peshawar and Nowshera Brigades, Claude Auchinleck and Harold Alexander, both rose to high rank in World War II. Auchinleck, the senior Brigadier, commanded Mohforce; as the Peshawar District G.O.C. General Muspratt was on leave in Britain.

Mohforce left near the end of summer, with two tanks in front of the leading troops which could be used to outflank tribesman who pinned down the infantry. The tanks were Mark II light tanks, with a single Vickers machine gun. They did not have their radios, which had been withdrawn for their annual overhaul, so one tank had to act as a "runner" between the tanks and the infantry. The Mohmand, having no word for tanks, called them "the snakes that spit".

The troops advanced into the Kamalai plateau, the tribal heartland west of the Swat River. The road and water supply had to be extended, taking six weeks, before they could advance into the Nahakki Pass. Then the heights around the Nahakki Pass were taken in a night operation, and after dawn the cavalry went through the pass to the plain beyond. The headquarters, now commanded by General Muspratt, was established about 5 miles south of the Nahakki Pass at Kamalai.

In September a reconnaissance in force southwest of Nahakki was ambushed, with 35 deaths in Mohforce: 2 British and 2 Indian officers, and 1 British and 30 Indian Other Ranks (Capt Godfrey Meynell VC MC & Lt Tony Rendall MC); the operation by the Guides or 5th/12th Frontier Force Regiment was described as "sketchily planned and uncoordinated".

After fierce fighting, the Mohmand attackers were driven off and the British pushed deep into Mohmand territory. This put an end to the tribal revolt and order was reinforced.

== Aftermath ==
Following the capture of Badmanai Pass the British convened a jirga to establish peace which the Mohmand tribesmen came to terms in October. Subsequently, British troops withdrew to their territory, marking the conclusion of the conflict, which occurred towards the end of October. Auchinleck's service in the campaign greatly enhanced his reputation and was appointed deputy chief of the General staff in India and was promoted Major General.

Captain Godfrey Meynell was awarded a posthumous Victoria Cross for his gallantry on 29 September at the Nahqi Pass.

== See also ==
- Category:British military personnel of the Second Mohmand Campaign
