= Ramani Fernando =

Sri Lankan hairstylist

Ramani Fernando is a Sri Lankan entrepreneur and a pioneer in the country's hair and beauty industry. Recognised as one of Sri Lanka’s most prominent female entrepreneurs, she has been in business since 1975. She is the founder and managing director of Ramani Fernando Salons Group, which operates one of the largest chains of hair and beauty salons in the country. In addition to her salon business, she runs a leading training academy, in partnership with Sunsilk, and holds a controlling interest in Sri Lanka’s largest distributor of professional hair and beauty products. She is married to former Sri Lankan cricketer and commentator Ranjit Fernando and they have four children, Rashika Fernando, Rishen Fernando, Rehan Fernando and Rakhil Fernando.

== Biography ==
She was raised up in Kuliyapitiya, a town which was predominantly known for having a population mostly composed of professionals like doctors and lawyers. Ramani's father was also reportedly a lawyer. She grew up during an era when there was no access to both television or fashionable magazines in Sri Lanka.

== Career ==
She pursued her primary and secondary education at St. Bridget's Convent, Colombo. Soon after completing her primary and secondary education at school level, she immediately made a life changing decision by venturing into the field of hairdressing and hairstyling. She actually began hairdressing as a passion and hobby and she subsequently joined a local training college. However, she later revealed that her initial passion was fashion and design, but she acknowledged that there was far more demand and scope for hair and beauty, hence she switched her mindset oriented towards hair and beauty. To be precise, she was supposed to pursue her interest in fashion designing, but due to the absence of schools specifically focusing the subject genre of fashion designing, she moved on to prioritise hairdressing.

She admitted that she learnt the real experience of hairdressing during her brief but productive stay in England alongside her spouse Ranjith. She gained her firsthand experience in hairstyle related job at Gerard Martin – London Gold where she received a job offer in the role of a stylist's assistant. Her first job had hardly anything to be memorable of as she was only given minor roles including sweeping, shampooing, cleaning and making cups of coffee to clients as well as to walk-in customers. She then endured a brief stint at Raymond's salon in England where she worked as a junior stylist. After gaining a valuable exposure abroad, she returned to Sri Lanka and started her own business model right from the scratch initially at her own house located at Elibank Road. Ramani eventually launched the Ramani Fernando Salons to kickstart her dream career in the field of hairstyling. Ramani Fernando Salons eventually picked up gradually and branches were established in across various parts of Sri Lanka.

Ramani Fernando Salons has notably forged a long collaboration with HSBC Colombo Fashion Week for a duration of over 18 years with the set agreement of preparing of hair and makeup looks for models. She was eventually the first ever recipient of the Woman Entrepreneur of the Year when such award was launched in Sri Lanka. She won the inaugural Woman Entrepreneur of the Year Award from the Federation of Chambers of Commerce and Industry. She was also conferred with the prestigious Zonta Woman of Achievement during the 1990s.

She has worked alongside many female hairstylists in the country in her illustrious career spanning over a period of five decades. Ramani has predominantly given her focus and priority related to the aspect of crafting bridal hairstyles for brides who are gearing for weddings. In 2016, she was invited as one of the judges to officiate in the bridal section of the 40th Anniversary Asian Hairstyling and Beauty Competition which was held at the Queen Elizabeth Stadium in Hong Kong. Furthermore, her organisation Ramani Fernando Salons was eventually adjudged as the recipient of an award for Outstanding Business Achievement during the 40th Anniversary Asian Hairstyling and Beauty Competition.

Her technical prowess in the hair and beauty industry had eventually opened floodgates for more upcoming aspiring budding female hairstylists in Sri Lanka to stamp their authority and as well to challenge the status quo with regards to the barriers and stereotypes surrounding around women. In 2014, writer and author Dila Hettiaratchy launched a biography titled A Journey with Style based on the life trajectory of beautician Ramani Fernando.
