= Zone 5 Military Museum, Danang =

Zone 5 Military Museum
- Bao Tang Quan Khu 5
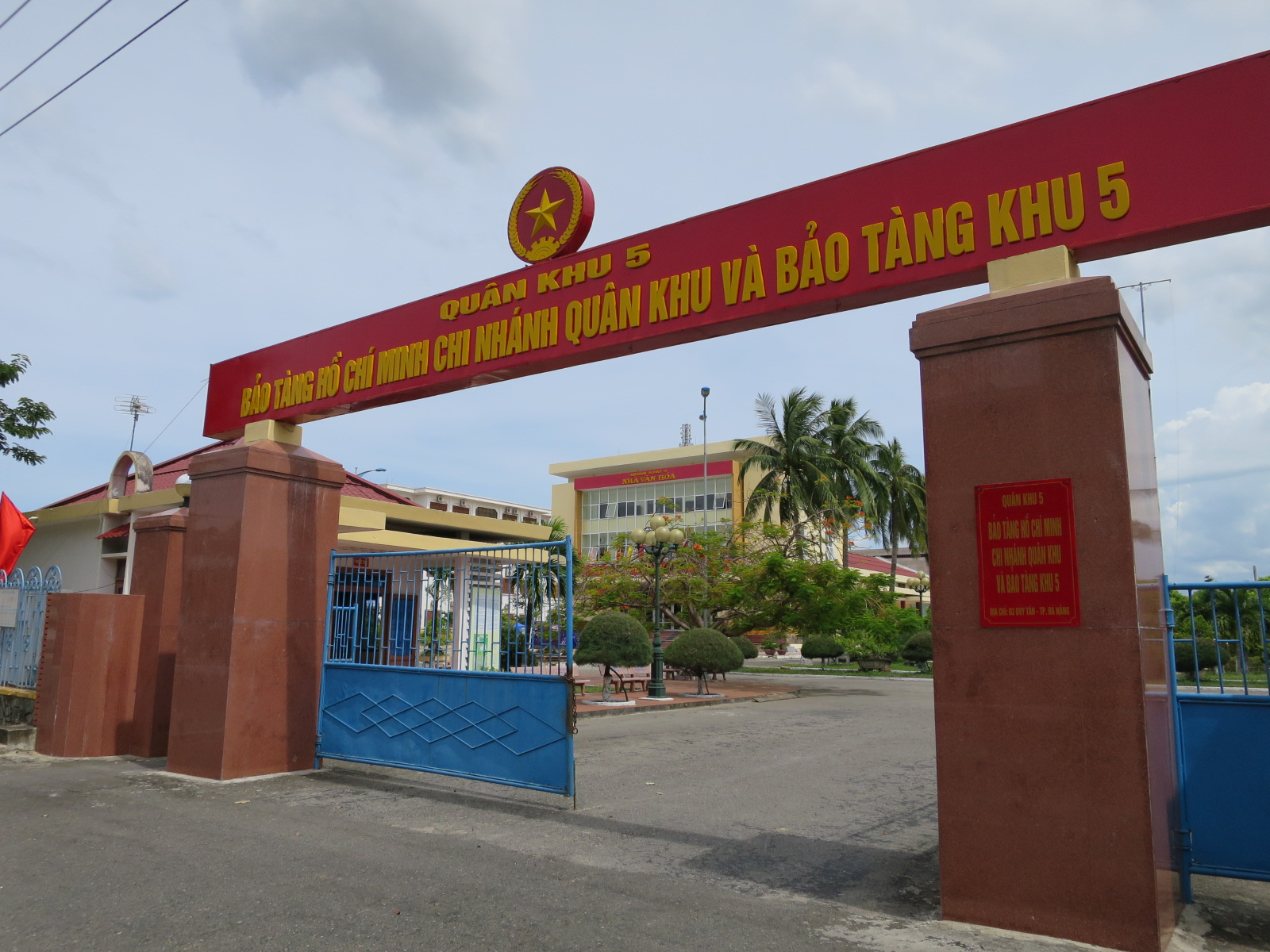
- Entrance to Zone 5 Military Museum
- Location: 3 Duy Tân, Da Nang, Vietnam
- Coordinates: 16.0487°N 108.2177°E
- Type: Military museum
- Owner: Government of Vietnam

The Zone 5 Military Museum (Bao Tang Khu 5) is a military museum located at 3 Duy Tân, Da Nang, Vietnam. It covers all Vietnamese resistance to foreign occupation from the Chinese occupation, the First Indochina War with the French, the Vietnam War and the current standoff with China over the Spratly Islands and the Paracel Islands.

The Museum's opening hours are from 07:30 to 10:30 and from 13:30 to 16:30 daily except Monday. Admission is free for Vietnamese and VND 60,000 for non-Vietnamese, plus VND 10,000 to take photos.

== Exhibits ==
The museum complex comprises four main sections: an outdoor display of large military equipment; a military museum; a reproduction of Ho Chi Minh's house in Hanoi; and a Ho Chi Minh Museum.

=== Outdoor display ===
Items on display:

- 100 mm field gun M1944 (BS-3) produced in Soviet Union
- Cessna A-37 Dragonfly 10793 light aircraft captured at Da Nang Air Base on March 29, 1975 and later used in the Bombing of Tan Son Nhut Air Base
- BLU-82 "Daisy Cutter" bomb recovered from An Lão District in 2006
- Soviet-built Bulldozers (2)
- Cessna O-1 Bird Dog 042 captured in 1975 and subsequently used in the early stages of the Cambodian–Vietnamese War
- M8 Greyhound armoured car captured from Groupe Mobile 100 in the Battle of Mang Yang Pass
- M-46 130mm towed field gun
- M41 tank used by the ARVN 14th Armored Cavalry Regiment and captured at Tân Cảnh during the Battle of Kontum in May 1972
- M48A3 Patton tank used by the ARVN 1st Cavalry Brigade and captured at Da Nang on March 29, 1975
- M101 howitzer (2) captured in Bình Định Province in 1972
- M102 howitzer captured in April 1975
- M107 self-propelled gun captured at Da Nang in March 1975
- M113 armored personnel carrier captured in 1975 and subsequently used in the Cambodian–Vietnamese War
- M114 155 mm howitzer captured in 1954 in the Battle of Mang Yang Pass
- M1938 122mm howitzer used by People's Army of Vietnam (PAVN) Brigade 52 to attack the ARVN base in Minh Long District in 1974
- M1939 37mm anti-aircraft gun used by PAVN Regiment 573 it apparently shot down an A-37 in Tiên Phước District on 17 March 1975
- M1943 160mm mortar used by PAVN Regiment 576 to attack the ARVN base in Minh Long District in 1974
- M578 Light Recovery Vehicle captured in 1975
- Mikoyan-Gurevich MiG-21 5114 of the VPAF 931st Regiment used by Nguyen Van Nghia to shoot down a US McDonnell Douglas F-4 Phantom II over Bac Thai in 1972
- MiG-21 5127 of the VPAF 931st Regiment used by Le Khuong
- P-15 Termit antiship missile
- QF 3.7-inch mountain howitzer captured from the French in Bình Thuận Province in 1953
- S-75 Dvina SA-2 Guideline SAM, used by Regiment 275, Air Defence Division 375
- T34/85 tank used in Operation Lam Son 719
- Toyota pickup mounting a recoilless rifle captured in the Cambodian-Vietnamese War
- Bell UH-1 Huey helicopter 69-15130 captured in 1975 and subsequently used in the Cambodian–Vietnamese War
- ZIL-157 general purpose truck

=== Military Museum ===
Displays include:

- Memorials to Ho Chi Minh and Võ Nguyên Giáp
- Memorials to the leaders and heroes of the Zone 5 Military
- Memorials to mothers whose only children or multiple children were killed during the Vietnam War
- Photographic display of Vietnam's historic claims to the Trường Sa (Spratley) and Hoàng Sa (Paracel) Islands
- Opposition to the French in Nha Trang in October 1946
- The Battle of Mang Yang Pass
- Battle of Ba Gia
- Operation Starlite
- Battle of Ia Drang
- Hue–Da Nang Campaign
- Operations against FULRO

== Gallery ==
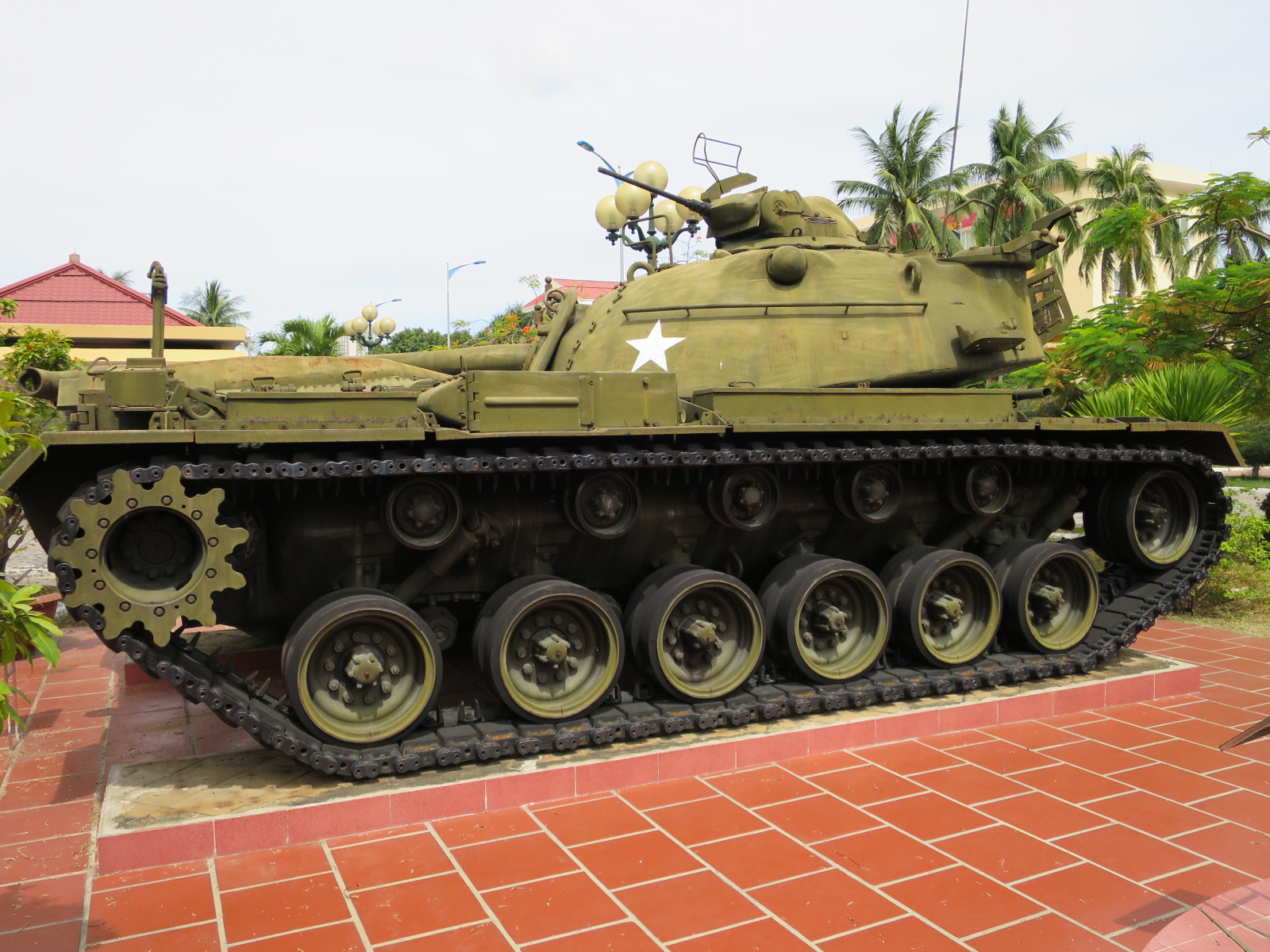
M48A3 tank

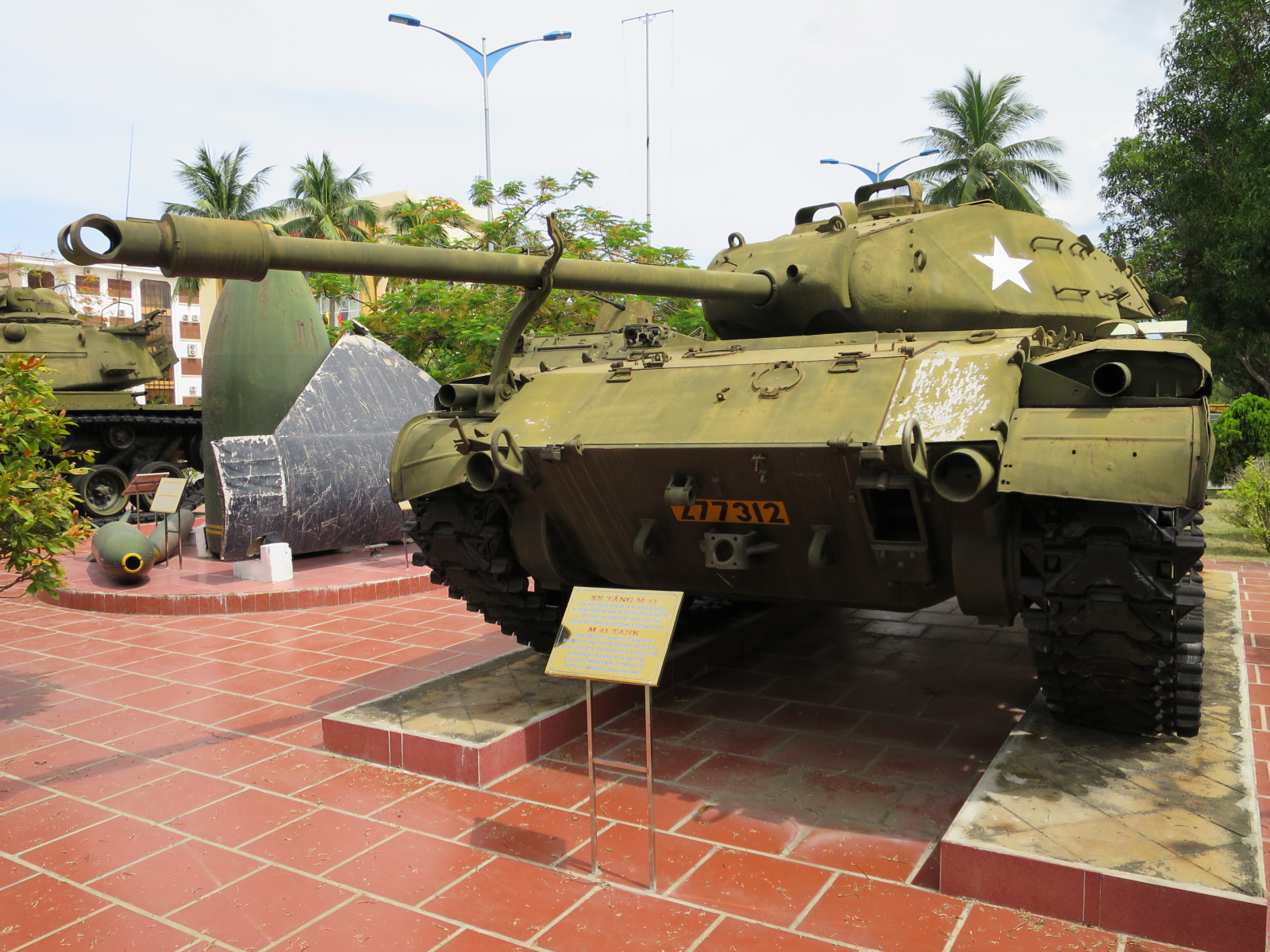
M41 tank

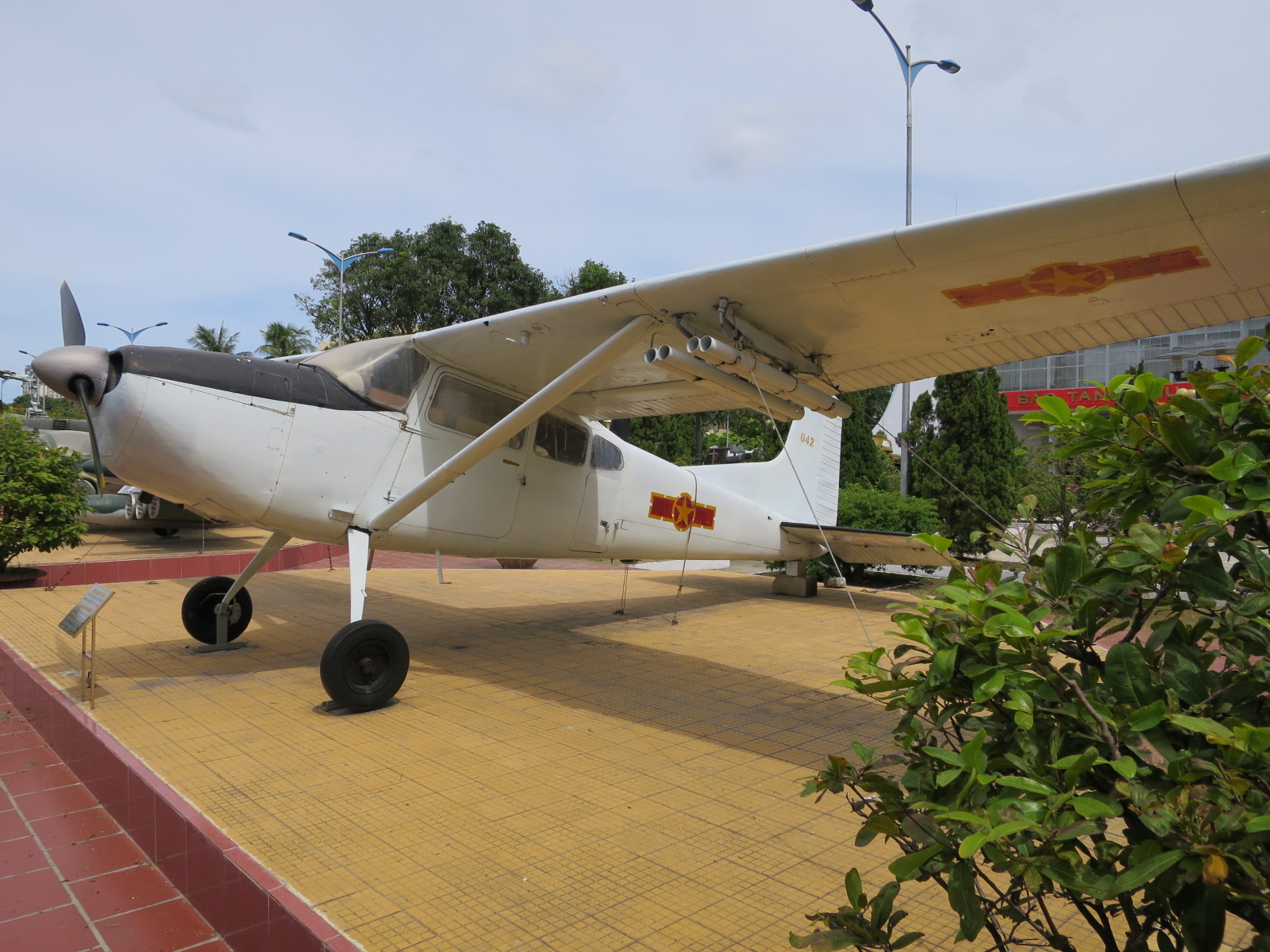
L-19 042 Bird Dog

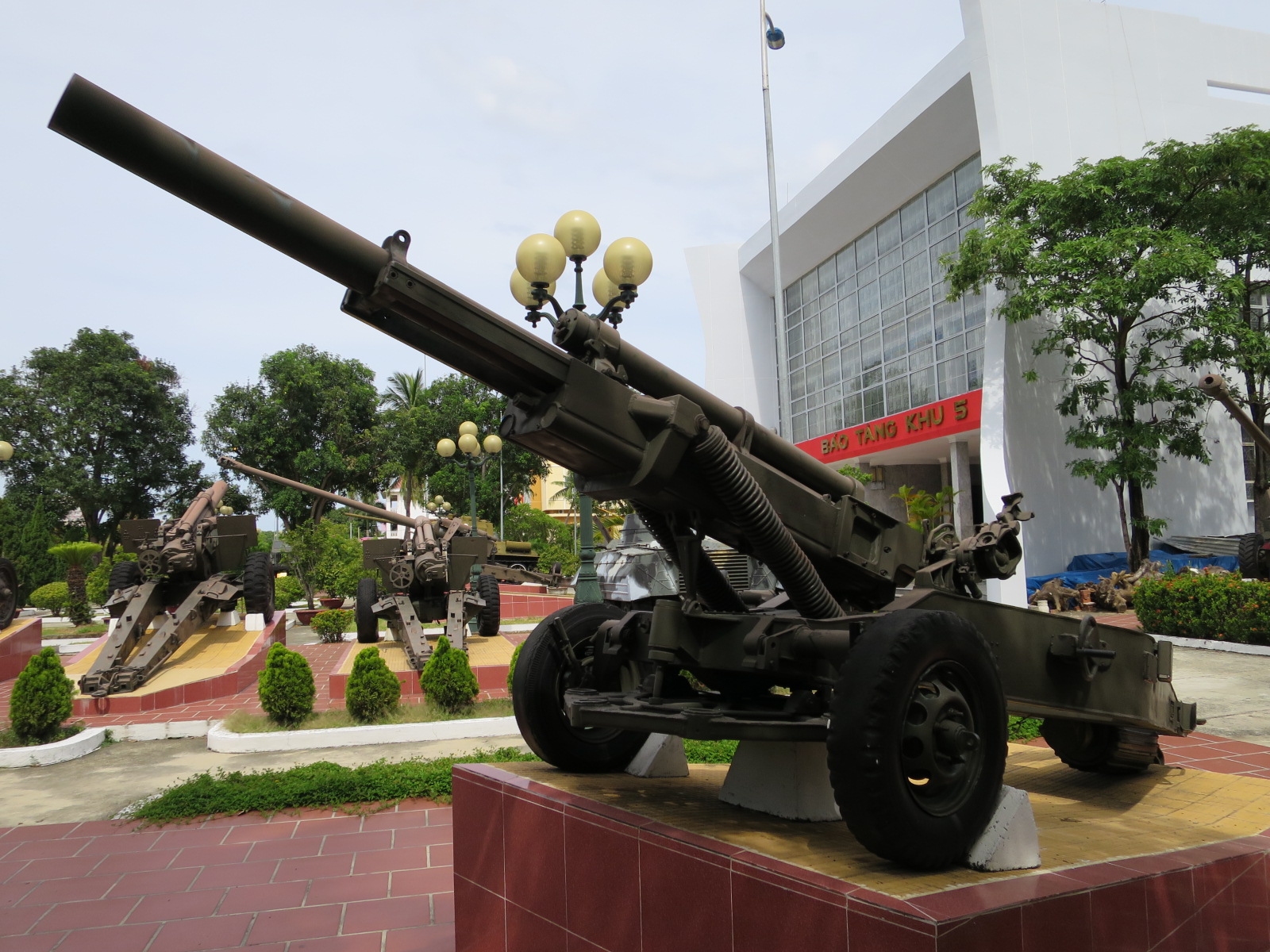
M102 howitzer

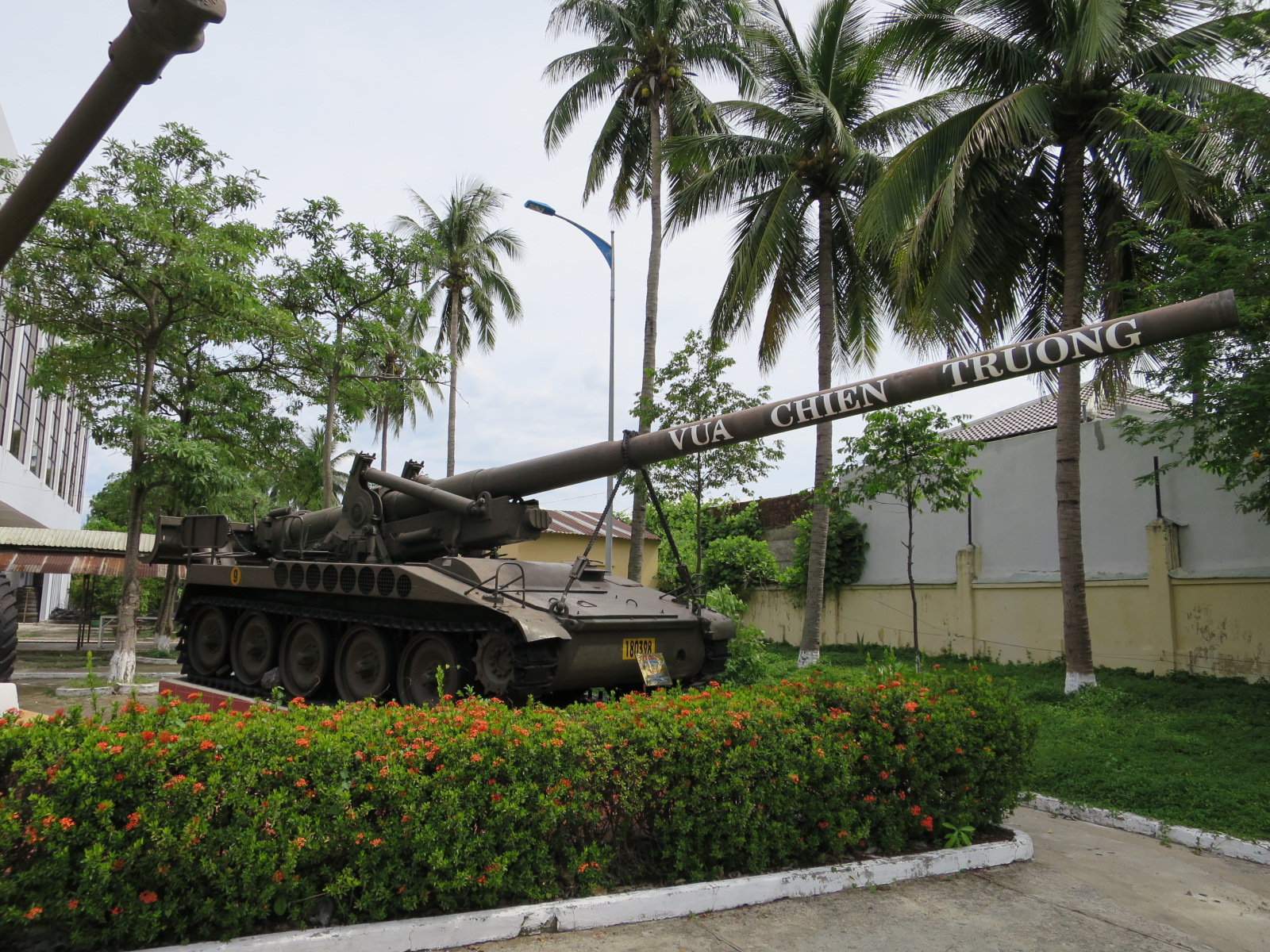
M107 self-propelled gun
