= Hugo Rawlinson =

English cricketer

Personal information
- Full name: Hugo Christopher Luke Rawlinson
- Born: 14 February 1988 (age 38); Lambeth, London, England
- Height: 5 ft 8 in (1.73 m)
- Batting: Right-handed
- Bowling: Right-arm medium
- Relatives: John Rawlinson (father); Harry Rawlinson (uncle)

Domestic team information
- Years: Team
- 2008: Durham UCCE

Career statistics
Competition	First-class
Matches	3
Runs scored	15
Batting average	3.75
100s/50s	–/–
Top score	9
Catches/stumpings	3/–
- Source: Cricinfo, 19 August 2011

Hugo Christopher Luke Rawlinson (born 14 April 1988) is an English cricketer. Rawlinson is a right-handed batsman who bowls right-arm medium pace. He was born in Lambeth, London to the cricketer John Rawlinson, and was educated at Eton College.

While studying for his degree at Durham University, Rawlinson made his first-class debut for Durham UCCE against Derbyshire. He made two further first-class appearances for the university in 2008, against Durham and Lancashire, both in 2008. In his three first-class matches, he scored just 15 runs at an average of 3.75, with a high score of 9.
