= Peter Morgan (cricketer) =

South African cricketer

Personal information
- Full name: Peter Gregory Morgan
- Born: 29 September 1972 (age 54); Johannesburg, Transvaal, South Africa
- Batting: Right-handed
- Bowling: Right-arm medium-fast

Domestic team information
- Years: Team
- 1997: Oxford University

Career statistics
Competition	First-class
Matches	10
Runs scored	444
Batting average	26.11
100s/50s	–/2
Top score	63
Catches/stumpings	4/–
- Source: Cricinfo, 31 March 2020

Peter Gregory Morgan (born 29 September 1972) is a South African former first-class cricketer.

Born at Johannesburg in September 1972, Morgan was educated in England at Eton College, before going up to Keble College, Oxford. While studying at Oxford, he played first-class cricket for Oxford University in 1997, making ten appearances, including an appearance in The University Match against Cambridge University. In his ten first-class matches, he scored 444 runs at an average of 26.11 and a high score of 63.
