= Rakhil Fernando =

Sri Lankan tech executive (born 1982)

Jude Rakhil Fernando (born 4 November 1982) is a Sri Lankan tech executive and entrepreneur. The son of cricketer Ranjit Fernando and entrepreneur Ramani Fernando he is the CEO of Yabi, which focuses on financial literacy across the MENA region. He is a goodwill ambassador for Habitat for Humanity in Sri Lanka.

Previously he was the CEO and co-founded Koko, the Daraz group (an Alibaba Company) fintech startup operating across South East Asia. He was also the managing director and chief corporate officer of Daraz. Prior to Alibaba Group, he was CEO and co-founder of Kashmi, a peer 2 peer payments company, funded by DP World.

== Education ==
Rakhil Fernando attended Eton College, an independent English public school, and studied aerospace engineering at Embry-Riddle Aeronautical University.
