= 22nd Derajat Mountain Battery (Frontier Force) =

- Active: 1849–1947
- Country: Indian Empire
- Branch: Army
- Type: Artillery
- Part of: Punjab Army (to 1895); Punjab Command
- Engagements: Indian Rebellion of 1857; Second Afghan War; Chitral Expedition; Tirah Campaign; World War I Third Afghan War; Mohmand and Bajaur Operations (1933); Mohmand Campaign (1935); Waziristan campaign 1936–1939; World War II

The 22nd Derajat Mountain Battery (Frontier Force) was an artillery battery in the British Indian Army. The battery was raised in 1851, from disbanded Sikh artillerymen following the Second Sikh War.

In 1857, one detachment saw service against mutineers in Oudh and Bundlekand in the Indian Rebellion of 1857. The Second Afghan War (1878–80) saw the Derajat Mountain Battery serve with General Roberts throughout the war, and were present at the battles of Peiwar Kotal and Charasiab, the siege of the Sherpur Cantonment at Kabul, and then on the march to south Afghanistan and the Battle of Kandahar. After the war, in addition to numerous minor Frontier campaigns, the 22nd took part in the 1895 Chitral Expedition. Two years later it took part in the operations of the Tirah Campaign. To honour the visit of the Prince and Princess of Wales to India, they took part in the Rawalpindi Parade 1905.

In the First World War, the 22nd in 1916 joined the Indian Expeditionary Force B in the campaign against the Germans in German East Africa, where it would remain until the Armistice. After the war, the Battery saw service during the Third Afghan War of 1919, the Mohmand and Bajaur Operations (1933), Mohmand Campaign (1935) and operations in Waziristan against the Fakir of Ipi from 1936. In World War II they were part of the force sent to the East African Campaign.

On the partition of India in 1947, the battery was allocated to the new Indian Army.
