= Hugo Anthony Meynell =

British philosopher (1936–2021)

Hugo Anthony Meynell (23 March 1936 – 1 October 2021) was an English academic, author and Christian rationalist.

== Academic career ==
Born in Meynell Langley, Derbyshire, England, half a year after the death of his father, Captain Godfrey Meynell, who was awarded the Victoria Cross for action against Afghan raiders in India's Khyber Pass, Hugo grew up as a member of an English family which arrived in England with the Norman conquest of England. His mother was Sophia Patricia (but known as Jill) née Lowis.

He was educated at Eton and at King's College at the University of Cambridge, where he obtained his PhD. After completing his graduate work Dr. Meynell taught at the University of Leeds before moving to the University of Calgary in 1981. He wrote thirteen academic books and numerous peer reviewed articles as well as regular book reviews in the Heythrop Journal and similar publications.

He was elected a member of the Royal Society of Canada in 1993, and is listed in the Canadian Who's Who.

== Christian Rationalism ==
Meynell described himself as a "Christian Rationalist" in the tradition of Thomas Aquinas (1225–1274) and Bernard Lonergan (1904–1984), on whose work he has written. His numerous books include works on philosophy, psychology, and even music. A devout Roman Catholic convert, he had an evangelical outlook and sympathy for British and American Protestantism. In his later books he expressed a strong distaste for postmodernism and what he called "academic fads". Latterly, he was engaged in a study of contemporary atheism.

== Books ==
Meynell's many publications include:

- God and the World: the Coherence of Christian Theism, London, S.P.C.K., 1971
- An Introduction to the Philosophy of Bernard Lonergan, New York : Barnes & Noble Books, 1976
- Freud, Marx, and Morals, Totowa, N.J. : Barnes & Noble Books, 1981
- The Intelligible Universe: A Cosmological Argument, Totowa, N.J. : Barnes & Noble, 1982
- The Theology of Bernard Lonergan, Atlanta, Ga. : Scholars Press, 1986
- The Art of Handel's Operas, Lewiston, N.Y. : E. Mellen Press, 1986
- Is Christianity true?, Washington, D.C. : Catholic University of America Press, 1994
- Redirecting philosophy: Reflections of the Nature of Knowledge from Plato to Lonergan, Toronto; Buffalo: University of Toronto Press, 1998
- Postmodernism and the New Enlightenment, Washington, D.C. : Catholic University of America Press, 1999
