= James Macadam =

English cricketer (born 1988)

Personal information
- Full name: James Chalmers Macadam
- Born: 29 June 1988 (age 38); Paddington, London, England
- Height: 6 ft 8 in (2.03 m)
- Batting: Right-handed
- Bowling: Right-arm medium-fast

Domestic team information
- Years: Team
- 2007: Oxford University
- 2008: Oxford UCCE

Career statistics
Competition	First-class
Matches	2
Runs scored	11
Batting average	11.00
100s/50s	–/–
Top score	7
Balls bowled	162
Wickets	1
Bowling average	101.00
5 wickets in innings	–
10 wickets in match	–
Best bowling	1/41
Catches/stumpings	–/–
- Source: Cricinfo, 9 June 2020

James Chalmers Macadam (born 29 June 1988) is an English first-class cricketer.

Macadam was born at Paddington in June 1988. He was educated at Eton College, before going up to Keble College, Oxford to study geography. He played first-class cricket while studying at Oxford, making a single appearance each for Oxford University in The University Match against Cambridge University at Fenner's in 2007, before appearing for Oxford UCCE against Glamorgan at Oxford in 2008. (Note: Oxford UCCE differed from Oxford University Cricket Club in that it was open to students at Oxford Brookes University, whereas Oxford University Cricket Club is exclusively for students of the constituent colleges of the University of Oxford.) He later studied for his MPhil at Downing College at the University of Cambridge.
