= West de Wend Fenton =

Soldier of the French Foreign Legion

(Michael) West de Wend Fenton (2 February 1927 – 6 July 2002), the squire of Ebberston Hall, North Yorkshire, was an English landowner, adventurer and eccentric, whose desertion from the French Foreign Legion in 1954 was the subject of a book, The Reluctant Legionnaire, by Michael Alexander.

== Family and antecedents ==
Fenton was the son of Major William de Wend Fenton, who in 1941 bought the estate of Ebberston for £5,000. Fenton’s own later account of his antecedents was that he was partly Jewish, partly Polish and partly Dutch:

A tribe wended its way from the other side of the Urals into Europe, settled in Poland, then in Germany, and at the end of the 18th century Michael Wend came to England from Holland and put a "de" in front of his name. His son married an heiress, a Miss Fenton.

Fenton was educated at a number of schools, including (briefly) Eton.

== Desertion from the Foreign Legion ==
As a young man, Fenton, who had served in the Scots Guards and King's Shropshire Light Infantry, was impelled by a romantic disappointment to join the Foreign Legion but soon came to regret his decision.

As Nicholas Mosley recounted, Michael Alexander, Lady Marye Rous, and Mosley himself:

…set off for Sidi Bel Abbès, in Algeria, a Legion headquarters on the edge of the Sahara. We discovered where West was stationed, and the whereabouts of a cafe legionnaires frequented in the evenings. By this time, the journalists and a camera man, who were following in another car, had decided that my presence ruined the romance of the story, so I came home. Michael and Marye found West in the cafe and agreed a plan. Michael contacted the captain of a Polish boat in Oran, who agreed to take West to Europe for a bribe. Michael picked up West, drove him by night to Oran, and West returned to England, where he lived happily, if eccentrically, ever after, and married the girl who had jilted him.

A full account of the escapade was given in Alexander's book, The Reluctant Legionnaire.

== Marriage and later life ==
Having married Margaret Lygon, the woman for whose sake he had joined the Legion and with whom he eventually had four children, Fenton lived for some time in Greece and ran idiosyncratic tours to the Soviet Union before settling permanently at Ebberston. His obituary recorded:

The family lived in a relaxed style that was truer, perhaps, to the 18th century spirit than the conventions of costume drama would allow, in a jumble of chamber pots, gnawed bones and empty bottles, and on an equal footing with a menagerie of goats, chickens, pot-bellied pigs, deer, lamas, peacocks, and a baleful turkey called Henry. Some of the paying visitors were shocked. West farmed his remaining fifty acres on loosely organic principles (‘It’s just easier, you don’t have to buy fertilizer’), grew his own vegetables, made his own wine, and shot his own rooks, which he would throw into the freezer with their feathers on.

On one occasion, returning home from York, Fenton was dismayed when his train failed to stop at Malton station, where his wife awaited him, and accordingly pulled the emergency communication cord. It was reported that he had been fined £33 for opening a door on a train between stations and unreasonable use of the communication cord.

Fenton died on 6 July 2002.
