= Nick Pretzlik =

English cricketer, businessman, and philanthropist

Personal information
- Full name: Nicholas Charles Pretzlik
- Born: 30 July 1945; Crawley, Sussex, England
- Died: 11 July 2004 (aged 58); Kensington, London, England
- Batting: Left-handed
- Bowling: Right-arm medium

Career statistics
Competition	First-class
Matches	1
Runs scored	16
Batting average	16.00
100s/50s	–/–
Top score	16
Catches/stumpings	–/–
- Source: Cricinfo, 22 September 2023

Nicholas Charles Pretzlik (30 July 1945 – 11 July 2004) was an English first-class cricketer, businessman and philanthropist.

The son of a Scottish mother and a wartime Royal Air Force pilot, he was born at Crawley in July 1945. Pretzlik was educated at Ludgrove School and later Eton College. He was an able sportsman, playing cricket and becoming the English ski jumping champion at the age of 17. In March and April 1964, he toured the subcontinent with E. W. Swanton's personal cricket team, making a single appearance in first-class cricket on the tour against an Indian XI at Eden Gardens; batting once in the match, he was dismissed for 16 runs by Bhagwat Chandrasekhar.

Pretzlik went into business with the Arthur Woollacott Group, founded by his grandfather, which specialised in paper and packaging. Ill-health, in which he suffered blackouts at the age of 49, necessitated his retirement from the business. Following his retirement, he spent his time travelling by walking and cycling around South America. Upon his return home, he found himself restless and travelled once more, this time to Africa, Asia, and the Middle East.

It was while investigating how safe it would be for one of his sons to travel to Israel, that Prezlik became interested in the Israeli–Palestinian conflict, and would, as a result, become an advocate for Palestinian causes. He helped to raise money to enable medical treatment and educational opportunities for young Palestinians. Pretzlik died from heart failure at Kensington in July 2004, shortly before he was due to embark on a fundraising cycle ride from London to Jerusalem. He was survived by his wife, Ursula, and their two sons.
