= Alex Ball (cricketer) =

English cricketer

Personal information
- Full name: Alexander Henry Ball
- Born: 3 October 1986 (age 40); Westminster, Middlesex, England
- Height: 6 ft 10 in (2.08 m)
- Batting: Right-handed
- Bowling: Right-arm off break

Domestic team information
- Years: Team
- 2007–2009: Oxford University

Career statistics
Competition	First-class
Matches	5
Runs scored	155
Batting average	22.14
100s/50s	0/0
Top score	44*
Catches/stumpings	6/–
- Source: Cricinfo, 16 September 2019

Alexander Henry Ball (born 3 October 1986) is an English former first-class cricketer.

Ball was born at Westminster in October 1986. He was educated at Eton College, before going up to St Catherine's College, Oxford. While studying at Oxford, he made his debut in first-class cricket for Oxford University against Cambridge University in the 2007 The University Match at Lord's. He played two further first-class matches for Oxford University, in the 2008 and 2009 University Matches. In addition to playing first-class cricket for Oxford, Ball also played two first-class matches for Oxford MCCU against Nottinghamshire in 2008 and 2009. In his five first-class matches, he scored 155 runs at an average of 22.14, with a high score of 44 not out.
