= Godfrey Meynell =

Recipient of the Victoria Cross

Godfrey Meynell VC MC
- Born: 20 May 1904; Meynell Langley, Derbyshire, England
- Died: 29 September 1935 (aged 31); Nahaaqi Pass, Khyber Pass, British India
- Burial place: Guides Chapel, Mardan, British India
- Relatives: Hugo Anthony Meynell (son)
- Military career
- Allegiance: United Kingdom
- Branch: British Indian Army
- Service years: 1926–1935
- Rank: Captain
- Units: 12th Frontier Force Regiment
- Conflicts: Mohmand campaign of 1935
- Awards: Victoria Cross; Military Cross

Godfrey Meynell, VC, MC (20 May 1904 – 29 September 1935) was a British Indian Army officer and a recipient of the Victoria Cross, the highest award for gallantry in the face of the enemy that can be awarded to British and Commonwealth forces.

== Early life and education ==
Meynell was the son of an army officer who was also named Godfrey Meynell, by his wife Edith Violet Cammell. He won a scholarship to Eton College. He was commended to Cyril Connolly when he arrived there as a boy with character. After an initial amount of bullying by Meynell of Connolly the two became firm friends as described in Enemies of Promise. He married "Jill", Sophia Patricia (Jill) Lowis, at the Guides Chapel in Mardan on 31 January 1933; both were speakers of Urdu. Their eldest son Godfrey was born on 20 July 1934.

== Military career ==
Meynell had graduated 13th at the Royal Military Academy Sandhurst before he volunteered for the British Indian Army. He was awarded the Military Cross in 1933 for his work in Chitral.

=== Victoria Cross ===
Meynell was thirty-one years old, and a captain in the 5th Battalion (Queen Victoria's Own Corps of Guides), 12th Frontier Force Regiment during the 1935 Mohmand Campaign in British India.

On 29 September 1935 at Mohmand, in the Nahaqi Pass within the Khyber Pass on the North West Frontier, in the final phase of an attack, Meynell, seeking information on the most forward troops, found them involved in a struggle against an enemy vastly superior in numbers. He at once took command, and with two Lewis guns and about thirty men, maintained a heavy and accurate fire on the advancing enemy, whose overwhelming numbers nevertheless succeeded in reaching the position and putting the Lewis guns out of action. In the hand-to-hand struggle which ensued, Meynell was mortally wounded, but the heavy casualties inflicted on the enemy prevented them from exploiting their success.

His body is laid to rest at the Guides Chapel in Mardan, near Peshawar in the North West Frontier Province (of what is now Pakistan), where he and his wife were married.

Three months after he was killed, news of the award of the VC arrived at Meynell Langley on 24 December 1935. Three months later their second son, Hugo Anthony Meynell, was born on 24 March 1936. His widow received the VC at a ceremony at Buckingham Palace on 14 July 1936, the only one to be bestowed by Edward VIII.
