= John Farmer (cricketer) =

English cricketer

Personal information
- Full name: John James Stewart Farmer
- Born: 5 August 1934 (age 92); Leatherhead, Surrey, England
- Batting: Right-handed

Domestic team information
- Years: Team
- 1958: Oxford University

Career statistics
Competition	First-class
Matches	2
Runs scored	10
Batting average	2.50
100s/50s	–/–
Top score	6
Catches/stumpings	–/–
- Source: Cricinfo, 3 May 2020

John James Stewart Farmer (born 5 August 1934) is an English former first-class cricketer.

Farmer was born at Leatherhead in August 1934. He was educated at Eton College, before going up to Christ Church, Oxford. While studying at Oxford, he made two appearances in first-class cricket for Oxford University against Gloucestershire and Lancashire at Oxford in 1958, scoring 10 runs.
