= Harry Rawlinson =

English cricketer, solicitor

Personal information
- Full name: Henry Thomas Rawlinson
- Born: 21 January 1963; Edgware, London, England
- Died: 28 January 2011 (aged 48); Ightham, Kent, England
- Batting: Right-handed
- Bowling: Right-arm medium
- Relatives: John Rawlinson (brother); Hugo Rawlinson (nephew)

Domestic team information
- Years: Team
- 1982–1984: Oxford University

Career statistics
Competition	First-class
Matches	16
Runs scored	156
Batting average	8.66
100s/50s	–/–
Top score	24
Balls bowled	2,081
Wickets	23
Bowling average	61.17
5 wickets in innings	1
10 wickets in match	–
Best bowling	5/123
Catches/stumpings	5/–
- Source: Cricinfo, 17 April 2020

Henry 'Harry' Thomas Rawlinson (21 January 1963 – 28 February 2011) was an English first-class cricketer.

Rawlinson was born at Edgware in January 1963. He was educated at Eton College, before going up to Trinity College, Oxford. While studying at Oxford, he played first-class cricket for Oxford University, making his debut against Worcestershire at Oxford in 1982. He played first-class cricket for Oxford until 1984, making a total of sixteen appearances. Playing primarily as a right-arm medium pace bowler, he took 23 wickets in his sixteen matches, at an average of 61.17. He took one five wicket haul, with figures of 5 for 123 against Worcestershire in 1983. As a lower order batsman, he scored 156 runs with a high score of 24.

Rawlinson died in February 2011 at Ingtham, Kent following a battle with cancer. He was survived by his wife and three children. His brother, John, played first-class cricket, as did his nephew Hugo Rawlinson.
