= John Rawlinson (cricketer, born 1959) =

English cricketer, solicitor

Personal information
- Full name: John Lawrence Rawlinson
- Born: 4 August 1959 (age 67); Edgware, London, England
- Batting: Right-handed
- Relatives: Hugo Rawlinson (son); Harry Rawlinson (brother)

Domestic team information
- Years: Team
- 1979–1980: Oxford University

Career statistics
Competition	First-class
Matches	9
Runs scored	112
Batting average	8.00
100s/50s	–/–
Top score	19
Catches/stumpings	5/–
- Source: Cricinfo, 17 April 2020

John Lawrence Rawlinson (born 4 August 1959) is an English artist and former first-class cricketer.

Rawlinson was born at Edgware in August 1959. He was educated at Eton College, before going up to University College, Oxford. While studying at Oxford, he played first-class cricket for Oxford University in 1979 and 1980, making nine appearances. He scored 112 runs in his nine matches, at an average of 8.00 and a high score of 19.

After graduating from Oxford, he completed a postgraduate degree at the University of Bristol. He has held a number of jobs after completing his studies, including as a banker and a teacher, before training to become an artist at the Cheltenham School of Fine Art. His brother Harry and son Hugo have both played first-class cricket.
