= Patrick Hennessy (journalist) =

Patrick Hennessy (born 10 July 1963) is a former journalist who currently serves as Director of Communications for the Mayor of London, Sadiq Khan. He was previously deputy director of Communications for the Labour Party, under leader Jeremy Corbyn and communications chief Seumas Milne, but left to join Sadiq Khan's campaign in the 2016 London mayoral election.

He was educated at Colet Court, Eton College and Lady Margaret Hall, Oxford (BA, 1985). He was previously political editor of The Sunday Telegraph from 2009 to 2013.
