= Rupert Daniels =

English cricketer (born 1945)

Personal information
- Full name: Rupert Chandos Daniels
- Born: 28 June 1945 (age 81); Edgbaston, Warwickshire, England
- Batting: Right-handed
- Bowling: Right-arm off break

Domestic team information
- Years: Team
- 1965–1966: Oxford University

Career statistics
Competition	First-class
Matches	7
Runs scored	97
Batting average	26
100s/50s	–/–
Top score	7.46
Balls bowled	264
Wickets	1
Bowling average	148.00
5 wickets in innings	–
10 wickets in match	–
Best bowling	1/29
Catches/stumpings	1/–
- Source: Cricinfo, 26 February 2020

Rupert Chandos Daniels (born 28 June 1945) is an English former first-class cricketer.

Daniels was born at Edgbaston in June 1945. He was educated at Eton College, before going up to Trinity College, Oxford. While studying at Oxford, he played first-class cricket for Oxford University in 1965 and 1966, making seven appearances against county opposition, though never featuring in The University Match. He scored 97 runs in his seven matches, with a high score of 26, in addition to taking a single wicket with his off break bowling.
