= List of Essex County Cricket Club players =

This is a complete list in alphabetical order of cricketers who have played for Essex County Cricket Club in top-class matches since 1894 when the team was elevated to first-class status before the club joined the County Championship in 1895. Essex has been classified as a List A team since the beginning of limited overs cricket in 1963 and as a top-level Twenty20 team since the inauguration of the Twenty20 Cup in 2003.

The details are the player's usual name followed by the years in which he was active as an Essex player and then his name is given as it would appear on modern match scorecards. Note that many players represented other first-class teams besides Essex and that some played for the club in minor cricket before 1894. Current players are shown as active to the latest season in which they played for the club. The list excludes Second XI and other players who did not play for the club's first team and players whose first team appearances were in minor matches only.

As of 16 September 2026

== A ==
- David Acfield (1966–1986) : D. L. Acfield
- Mark Adair (2023) : M. R. Adair (Note: Adair, Campher, Dockrell, and Foster were part of the Ireland team touring England in 2023. A match against Essex was part of that tour as a warmup prior to the test match against England. In order that more members of the Ireland squad could participate in the match, these four were “loaned” to Essex, and thus appeared for the county. Campher subsequently played for Essex in the 2025 One-Day Cup.)
- Andre Adams (2004–2006) : A. R. Adams
- Adeel Malik (2015) : Adeel Malik
- Zaman Akhter (2026) : Z. Akhter
- Ben Allison (2020–2024) : B. M. J. Allison
- Charlie Allison (2023–2026) : C. W. J. Allison
- Hashim Amla (2009) : H. M. Amla
- Ricaldo Anderson (1999–2001) : R. S. G. Anderson
- Steve Andrew (1990–1997) : S. J. W. Andrew
- Francis Appleyard (1946–1947) : F. Appleyard
- Harold Arkwright (1893–1895) : H. A. Arkwright
- Ashar Zaidi (2016–2018) : Ashar Zaidi
- Claude Ashton (1921–1938) : C. T. Ashton
- Hubert Ashton (1921–1939) : H. Ashton
- Percy Ashton (1924) : P. Ashton
- Jack Auld (2026) : J. A. G. Auld
- Sonny Avery (1935–1954) : A. V. Avery
- George Ayres (1899) : G. W. Ayres

== B ==
- Jack Bailey (1953–1958) : J. A. Bailey
- Trevor Bailey (1946–1967) : T. E. Bailey
- Richard Baker (1972) : R. K. Baker
- Arthur Banfield (1921) : A. E. Banfield
- Arthur Barber (1925) : A. N. Barber
- Gordon Barker (1954–1971) : G. Barker
- James Barnfather (1924) : J. D. Barnfather
- Patrick Barrow (1922) : P. L. Barrow
- John Bawtree (1895–1896) : J. F. Bawtree
- Michael Bear (1954–1968) : M. J. Bear
- Aaron Beard (2016–2024) : A. P. Beard
- George Bell (2026) : G. J. Bell
- Brian Belle (1935–1937) : B. H. Belle
- Luc Benkenstein (2021–2026) : L. Benkenstein
- Charles Benham (1904–1909) : C. E. Benham
- Charlie Bennett (2025–2026) : C. E. Bennett
- Maurice Berkley (1894) : M. Berkley
- Andy Bichel (2006–2007) : A. J. Bichel
- Frank Billham (1924) : F. D. Billham
- Justin Bishop (1999–2005) : J. E. Bishop
- David Boden (1992–1993) : D. J. P. Boden
- John Bonner (1896–1898) : J. W. Bonner
- Ravi Bopara (2002–2019) : R. S. Bopara
- Allan Border (1986–1988) : A. R. Border
- Oswell Borradaile (1891–1894) : O. R. Borradaile
- Norman Borrett (1937–1946) : N. F. Borrett
- Eathan Bosch (2024) : E. Bosch
- Cecil Boswell (1932–1936) : C. S. R. Boswell
- Keith Boyce (1966–1977) : K. D. Boyce
- Michael Boyers (1968–1969) : M. J. Boyers
- Doug Bracewell (2023–2025) : D. A. J. Bracewell
- Arthur Bradfield (1922) : A. Bradfield
- Scott Brant (2003–2004) : S. A. Brant
- Dwayne Bravo (2010) : D. J. Bravo
- Charles Bray (1927–1937) : C. Bray
- James Brinkley (1998) : J. E. Brinkley
- Orme Bristowe (1913–1914) : O. C. Bristowe
- Vic Brooks (1969–1971) : V. C. G. Brooks
- Adrian Brown (1988–1992) : A. D. Brown
- Rainy Brown (1924–1932) : G. R. R. Brown
- Nick Browne (2012–2025) : N. L. J. Browne
- Herbert Brunwin (1937) : H. J. Brunwin
- Claude Buckenham (1899–1914) : C. P. Buckenham
- Frederick Bull (1895–1900) : F. G. Bull
- James Burns (1887–1896) : J. Burns
- Neil Burns (1986) : N. D. Burns
- Herbert Burrell (1888–1895) : H. J. E. Burrell
- John Burrell (1894–1895) : R. J. Burrell
- Keith Butler (1989–1992) : K. A. Butler
- Will Buttleman (2019–2023) : W. E. L. Buttleman

== C ==
- Clem Calnan (1919–1929) : C. N. Calnan
- Percy Campbell (1911–1919) : P. Campbell
- Curtis Campher (2023–2025) : C Campher
- Nigel Capel-Cure (1929) : G. N. Capel-Cure
- Noel Carbutt (1923) : N. J. O. Carbutt
- Herbert Carpenter (1888–1920) : H. A. Carpenter
- Ronald Carr (1960) : R. B. Carr
- Andy Carter (2010) : A. Carter
- George Carter (1921–1923) : G. Carter
- Rodney Cass (1964–1967) : G. R. Cass
- Brian Castor (1932) : B. K. Castor
- Maurice Chambers (2005–2013) : M. A. Chambers
- Ivan Chapman (1929) : I. Chapman
- John Childs (1985–1996) : J. H. Childs
- Varun Chopra (2006–2020) : V. Chopra
- Horace Clark (1923) : H. G. Clark
- Len Clark (1946–1947) : L. S. Clark
- Ronald Clark (1912–1919) : R. D. Clark
- Andrew Clarke (2001–2004) : A. J. Clarke
- Bertie Clarke (1959–1960) : C. B. Clarke
- Richard Clinton (2001–2002) : R. S. Clinton
- David Cock (1939–1946) : D. F. Cock
- Edward Coleman (1912) : E. C. Coleman
- Matt Coles (2018–2019) : M. T. Coles
- Michael Comber (2007–2012) : M. A. Comber
- Edward Connor (1905) : E. J. Connor
- Alastair Cook (2003–2023) : A. N. Cook
- Sam Cook (2017–2026) : S. J. Cook
- Bob Cooke (1973–1975) : R. M. O. Cooke
- Albert Cooper (1923) : A. V. Cooper
- Fred Cooper (1921–1923) : F. J. Cooper
- Walter Cooper (1905–1910) : W. Cooper
- Francis Cottam (1922) : F. W. Cottam
- Peter Cousens (1950–1955) : P. Cousens
- Darren Cousins (1993–1998) : D. M. Cousins
- Ashley Cowan (1995–2005) : A. P. Cowan
- Jordan Cox (2024–2026) : J. M. Cox
- Harry Crabtree (1931–1947) : H. P. Crabtree
- Tom Craddock (2011–2014) : T. R. Craddock
- Charles Crawley (1929) : C. L. Crawley
- Leonard Crawley (1926–1936) : L. G. Crawley
- Chick Cray (1938–1950) : S. J. Cray
- Matt Critchley (2022–2026) : M. J. J. Critchley
- Matthew Cross (2016) : M. H. Cross
- Jim Cutmore (1924–1936) : J. A. Cutmore

== D ==
- Arthur Daer (1925–1935) : A. G. Daer
- Harry Daer (1938–1939) : H. B. Daer
- Jonathan Dakin (2002–2003) : J. M. Dakin
- Danish Kaneria (2004–2010) : Danish Kaneria
- Robin Das (2020–2026) : R. J. Das
- Geoffrey Davies (1912–1914) : G. B. Davies
- Michael Davies (2001) : M. K. Davies
- W. Davis (1920) : W. Davis (Note: Davis played in four County Championship matches during 1920 as well as for the Second XI during the same season. Other than a surname and initial no biographical details are known.)
- Liam Dawson (2015) : L. A. Dawson
- Herman de Zoete (1897) : H. W. de Zoete
- Cameron Delport (2019–2020) : C. S. Delport
- Mike Denness (1977–1980) : M. H. Denness
- Nicholas Denning (2003) : N. A. Denning
- Jack Dennis (1934–1939) : J. N. Dennis
- Nick Derbyshire (1995–1996) : N. A. Derbyshire
- Neil Dexter (2008) : N. J. Dexter
- Bill Dines (1947–1949) : W. J. Dines
- Steve Dinsdale (1970) : S. C. Dinsdale
- Muneeb Diwan (1994) : M. Diwan
- Joseph Dixon (1914–1922) : J. G. Dixon
- Matt Dixon (2016–2017) : M. W. Dixon
- George Dockrell (2023) : G. H. Dockrell
- Dickie Dodds (1946–1959) : T. C. Dodds
- Cecil Douglas (1912–1919) : C. H. Douglas
- Johnny Douglas (1901–1928) : J. W. H. T. Douglas
- Bill Dow (1958–1959) : W. D. F. Dow
- Harry Duke (2024) : H. G. Duke
- Tony Durley (1957) : A. W. Durley

== E ==
- David East (1981–1991) : D. E. East
- Ray East (1965–1984) : R. E. East
- George Eastman (1926–1929) : G. F. Eastman
- Laurie Eastman (1920–1939) : L. C. Eastman
- Brian Edmeades (1961–1976) : B. E. A. Edmeades
- Guy Edwards (1907) : G. J. Edwards
- Dean Elgar (2024–2026): D. Elgar
- Herbert Elliott (1913) : H. D. E. Elliott
- Ron Evans (1950–1957) : R. E. Evans
- Victor Evans (1932–1937) : V. J. Evans
- Stan Eve (1949–1957) : S. C. Eve

== F ==
- Frederick Fane (1895–1922) : F. L. Fane
- Harold Faragher (1949–1951) : H. A. Faragher
- Ken Farnes (1930–1939) : K. Farnes
- Geoffrey Farnfield (1921) : G. G. Farnfield
- William Faviell (1908) : W. F. O. Faviell
- Simon Fernandes (2024–2026) : S. M. L. Fernandes
- Michael Field-Buss (1987) : M. G. Field-Buss
- Ian Flanagan (1997–2000) : I. N. Flanagan
- Keith Fletcher (1962–1988) : K. W. R. Fletcher
- Andy Flower (2002–2007) : A. Flower
- Grant Flower (2005–2010) : G. W. Flower
- Ben Foakes (2011–2015) : B. T. Foakes
- Matthew Fosh (1976–1978) : M. K. Fosh
- James Foster (2000–2018) : J. S. Foster
- Matthew Foster (2023) : M. T. Foster
- Neil Foster (1980–1993) : N. A. Foster
- Bruce Francis (1971–1973) : B. C. Francis
- Henry Franklin (1921–1931) : H. W. F. Franklin
- James Franklin (2012) : J. E. C. Franklin
- Ronald Franklin (1924) : R. C. Franklin
- Alastair Fraser (1990–1992) : A. G. J. Fraser
- Alfred Freeman (1920) : A. J. Freeman
- Edward Freeman senior (1887–1896) : E. C. Freeman
- Edward Freeman junior (1904–1912) : E. J. Freeman
- John Freeman (1905–1928) : J. R. Freeman

== G ==
- Jason Gallian (2007–2009) : J. E. R. Gallian
- Gautam Gambhir (2013) : G. Gambhir
- Mike Garnham (1989–1995) : M. A. Garnham
- William Garrett (1900–1903) : W. T. Garrett
- Jack Gentry (1925) : J. S. B. Gentry
- Paul Gibb (1951–1956) : P. A. Gibb
- Archie Gibson (1895–1910) : A. L. Gibson
- Kenneth Gibson (1909–1912) : K. L. Gibson
- Frank William Gilligan (1919–1929) : F. W. Gilligan
- Frank Gillingham (1903–1928) : F. H. Gillingham
- Chris Gladwin (1981–1987) : C. Gladwin
- Billy Godleman (2009–2012) : B. A. Godleman
- Andrew Golding (1983) : A. K. Golding
- Graham Gooch (1972–1997) : G. A. Gooch
- Cecil Gosling (1930) : C. H. Gosling
- Robert Cunliffe Gosling (1888–1896) : R. C. Gosling
- Darren Gough (2004–2006) : D. Gough
- Leonard Graham (1926) : L. Graham
- Joe Grant (2001–2003) : J. B. Grant
- David Gray (1947) : D. A. A. Gray
- William Gray (1894) : W. J. Gray
- Paul Grayson (1996–2005) : A. P. Grayson
- Michael Green (1930) : M. A. Green
- Bill Greensmith (1947–1963) : W. T. Greensmith
- Colin Griffiths (1951–1953) : C. Griffiths
- Alfred Grimwood (1925) : A. S. Grimwood
- Tray Grinter (1909–1921) : T. G. Grinter
- Jamie Grove (1998–1999) : J. O. Grove
- Bill Gunary (1929) : W. C. Gunary (Note: Gunary was born at Dagenham in 1895. He was a farmer who played club cricket for Ilford, captaining the first XI from 1929 to 1932, as well as playing for both Dagenham and Dagenham United. He played a single match for the county team, a 1929 fixture against Leicestershire in which he bowled 19 overs in the match without taking a wicket.)

== H ==
- Aftab Habib (2002–2004) : A. Habib
- Sid Hadden (1912–1920) : S. Hadden
- Henry Hailey (1891–1895) : H. Hailey
- Harbhajan Singh (2012) : Harbhajan Singh
- Brian Hardie (1973–1990) : B. R. Hardie
- Mark Hardinges (2009) : M. A. Hardinges
- Steriker Hare (1921) : S. N. Hare
- Simon Harmer (2017–2026) : S. R. Harmer
- John Andrew Parker aka JackHarris (1905) : Harris (Note: Harris played in two first-class matches for the team as a wicket-keeper in 1905, scoring no runs and holding four catches. He may have had the first initial J, but otherwise no biographical details are known.)
- James Harrold (1923–1928) : J. G. W. Harrold
- Ronald Harvey (1952) : R. C. Harvey
- Cyril Hawker (1937) : F. C. Hawker
- Allan Hayzelden (1929–1931) : A. F. G. Hayzelden
- Wyndham Hazelton (1919) : E. W. Hazelton
- Arthur Heatley (1894) : A. E. Heatley
- Ray Heaven (1939) : R. M. Heaven
- Pat Hector (1976–1977) : P. A. Hector
- Reuben Herbert (1976–1981) : R. Herbert
- John Herringshaw (1921–1922) : J. P. Herringshaw
- Andrew Hibbert (1995–1998) : A. J. E. Hibbert
- George Higgins (1894–1895) : G. F. Higgins
- Harry Hills (1912–1919) : H. M. Hills
- Colin Hilton (1964) : C. Hilton
- Joe Hipkin (1923–1931) : A. B. Hipkin
- Robin Hobbs (1961–1975) : R. N. S. Hobbs
- George Hockey (1928–1931) : G. W. Hockey
- Tim Hodgson (1996–1999) : T. P. Hodgson
- Adam Hollioake (2007) : A. J. Hollioake
- Graham Horrex (1956–1957) : G. W. Horrex
- Dick Horsfall (1947–1955) : R. Horsfall
- William Hubble (1923) : W. G. Hubble
- Merv Hughes (1983) : M. G. Hughes
- Francis Hugonin (1927–1928) : F. E. Hugonin
- Alan Hurd (1958–1960) : A. Hurd
- Geoff Hurst (1962) : G. C. Hurst
- Nasser Hussain (1986–2004) : N. Hussain
- Barry Hyam (1993–2002) : B. J. Hyam
- Robert Hyndson (1919) : R. W. M. Hyndson

== I ==
- Mark Ilott (1988–2002) : M. C. Ilott
- John Inns (1898–1904) : J. H. Inns
- Doug Insole (1947–1969) : D. J. Insole
- Ronnie Irani (1994–2007) : R. C. Irani
- Lee Irvine (1968–1969) : B. L. Irvine

== J ==
- Jahid Ahmed (2005–2009) : Jahid Ahmed
- Victor Jarvis (1925) : V. E. Jarvis
- Will Jefferson (2000–2006) : W. I. Jefferson
- Cecil Jenkinson (1922–1923) : C. V. Jenkinson
- Lindsey Jerman (1950–1951) : L. C. S. Jerman
- Arthur Johnston (1889–1896) : A. S. Johnston
- Mackenzie Jones (2025–2026) : M. W. Jones
- Tony Jorden (1966–1970) : A. M. Jorden
- Ronald Joy (1922–1928) : R. C. G. Joy

== K ==
- Eshun Kalley (2023): E. S. Kalley
- Michael Kasprowicz (1994) : M. S. Kasprowicz
- Henry Keigwin (1906–1907) : H. D. Keigwin
- Richard Keigwin (1903–1919) : R. P. Keigwin
- Charles Kenny (1950–1953) : C. J. M. Kenny
- Terry Kent (1960–1962) : T. Kent
- Khaleel Ahmed (2025) : Khaleel Ahmed
- Feroze Khushi (2020–2024) : F. I. N. Khushi
- Mitchell Killeen (2026) : M. J. Killeen
- Ian King (1957) : I. M. King
- Robert King (1928) : R. J. S. King
- Barry Knight (1955–1966) : B. R. Knight
- Nick Knight (1991–1994) : N. V. Knight
- Charles Kortright (1889–1911) : C. J. Kortright

== L ==
- Jim Laker (1962–1964) : J. C. Laker
- Arthur Lapham (1921) : A. W. E. Lapham
- Albert Lashbrooke (1908) : A. E. Lashbrooke
- Alan Lavers (1937–1953) : A. B. Lavers
- Danny Law (1997–2000) : D. R. Law
- Stuart Law (1996–2001) : S. G. Law
- Dan Lawrence (2015–2023) : D. W. Lawrence
- Terry Lawrence (1933–1935) : T. P. Lawrence
- Jack Leiper (1950) : J. M. Leiper
- Robert Leiper (1981–1982) : R. J. Leiper
- John Lever (1967–1989) : J. K. Lever
- Derek Levick (1950–1951) : D. C. Levick
- Jonathan Lewis (1990–1996) : J. J. B. Lewis
- Alan Lilley (1978–1990) : A. W. Lilley
- Peter Lindsey (1964) : P. J. Lindsey
- Charles Littlehales (1896–1904) : C. G. Littlehales
- Jesse Littlewood (1905) : J. Littlewood
- George Locks (1928) : G. M. Locks
- George Louden (1912–1927) : G. M. Louden
- Francis Loveday (1921–1923) : F. A. Loveday
- Alfred Lucas (1889–1907) : A. P. Lucas
- Roger Luckin (1962–1963) : R. A. G. Luckin
- Ron Lynch (1954) : R. V. Lynch
- Lewis Lywood (1930) : L. W. Lywood

== M ==
- Malcolm Mackinnon (1927) : M. Mackinnon
- Sajid Mahmood (2013–2014) : S. I. Mahmood
- Steve Malone (1975–1978) : S. J. Malone
- John Marston (1923–1924) : J. W. Marston
- Arthur Martin (1920–1921) : A. D. Martin
- Chris Martin (2010) : C. S. Martin
- Eric Martin (1928) : E. G. Martin
- Oswald Martyn (1922) : O. Martyn
- Tim Mason (2000–2001) : T. J. Mason
- David Masters (2007–2016) : D. D. Masters
- John Maunders (2008–2010) : J. K. Maunders
- William Mayes (1914) : W. H. J. Mayes
- Adrian McCoubrey (2003–2004) : A. G. A. M. McCoubrey
- Michael McEvoy (1973–1981) : M. S. A. McEvoy
- Ken McEwan (1973–1985) : K. S. McEwan
- Charlie McGahey (1893–1921) : C. P. McGahey
- Bryce McGain (2010) : B. E. McGain
- Andrew McGarry (1999–2007) : A. C. McGarry
- Colin McIver (1902–1922) : C. D. McIver
- Harold Mead (1913–1914) : H. Mead
- Walter Mead (1890–1913) : W. Mead
- Gordon Melluish (1926) : G. C. Melluish
- Charles Mercer (1929) : C. F. Mercer
- Alexander Meston (1926–1927) : A. H. Meston (Note: The brother of Sam Meston, Alexander Meston played 12 first-class matches for the county, two in 1926 and ten the following year. An all-rounder, he scored 143 runs and took four wickets. The son of a Portuguese born export clerk, Meston was born at Leyton, educated at Kirkdale Road School, and worked as a clerk in the post office. He died at Illogan in Cornwall in 1980 aged 81.)
- Sam Meston (1907–1908) : S. P. Meston
- Jaik Mickleburgh (2007–2016) : J. C. Mickleburgh
- James Middlebrook (2002–2009) : J. D. Middlebrook
- Geoff Miller (1987–1989) : G. Miller
- Tymal Mills (2011–2014) : T. S. Mills
- Joseph Milner (1957–1961) : J. Milner
- Edward Missen (1921) : E. S. Missen
- George Mitchell (1926) : G. F. Mitchell
- Mohammad Akram (2003) : Mohammad Akram
- Mohammad Amir (2017–2025) : Mohammad Amir (Mohammad Aamer)
- Ken Moore (1961) : K. F. Moore
- Tom Moore (2014–2016) : T. C. Moore
- Bill Morris (1946–1950) : W. B. Morris
- Philip Morris (1909–1924) : P. E. Morris
- Whiz Morris (1919–1932) : H. M. Morris
- Harry Mortlock (1912–1921) : H. C. Mortlock
- Alf Moule (1921–1924) : A. S. Moule
- Wiaan Mulder (2026) : P. W. A. Mulder

== N ==
- Graham Napier (1997–2016) : G. R. Napier
- W. Naylor (1906) : W. Naylor (Note: Naylor played in one first-class match for Essex as a wicket-keeper in 1906. He scored two runs and held two catches. Other than a surname and initial no biographical details are known.)
- Jimmy Neesham (2021) : J. D. S. Neesham
- André Nel (2005–2008) : A. Nel
- Oliver Newby (2014) : O. J. Newby
- Fred Nicholas (1912–1929) : F. W. H. Nicholas
- Stan Nichols (1924–1939) : M. S. Nichols
- Aron Nijjar (2015–2022) : A. S. S. Nijjar
- Geoff Nolan (1968) : G. J. Nolan
- George Norman (1920) : G. Norman
- Oliver Norman (1932) : R. O. G. Norman

== O ==
- Jack O'Connor (1921–1939) : J. O'Connor
- Charles Orman (1896) : C. E. L. Orman
- Max Osborne (2009–2011) : M. Osborne
- Hugh Owen (1880–1902) : H. G. P. Owen

== P ==
- Hugh Page (1987) : H. A. Page
- Tony Palladino (2003–2010) : A. P. Palladino
- Eric Palmer (1957) : E. J. Palmer
- Harold Palmer (1924–1932) : H. J. Palmer
- Monty Panesar (2013–2015) : M. S. Panesar
- Len Parslow (1946) : L. F. Parslow
- Charles Pascoe (1909) : C. H. Pascoe
- Ravi Patel (2015) : R. H. Patel
- Rishi Patel (2019) : R. K. Patel
- Robert Paterson (1946–1948) : R. F. T. Paterson
- John Pawle (1935–1938) : J. H. Pawle
- Tom Pearce (1929–1950) : T. N. Pearce
- Richard Pearson (1994–1995) : R. M. Pearson
- Michael Pepper (2018–2026) : M. S. Pepper
- Percy Perrin (1896–1928) : P. A. Perrin
- Stephen Peters (1996–2001) : S. D. Peters
- Alviro Petersen (2012) : A. N. Petersen
- Mark Pettini (2001–2015) : M. L. Pettini
- Paddy Phelan (1958–1965) : P. J. Phelan
- Norbert Phillip (1978–1985) : N. Phillip
- Leslie Phillips (1919–1922) : L. J. Phillips
- Tim Phillips (1999–2014) : T. J. Phillips
- Harry Pickering (1938) : H. G. Pickering
- Harry Pickett (1881–1897) : H. Pickett
- Jack Plom (2018–2021) : J. H. Plom
- Steve Plumb (1975–1977) : S. G. Plumb
- Ian Pont (1985–1988) : I. L. Pont
- Keith Pont (1970–1986) : K. R. Pont
- Robert Pook (1988) : N. R. Pook
- Dudley Pope (1928–1934) : D. F. Pope
- Jamie Porter (2014–2026) : J. A. Porter
- Adam Powell (1932–1937) : A. G. Powell
- Jonathan Powell (1996–1999) : J. C. Powell
- Henry Preece (1895) : H. C. Preece
- Eddie Presland (1962–1972) : E. R. Presland
- Ken Preston (1948–1964) : K. C. Preston
- Eric Price (1948–1949) : E. J. Price
- Paul Prichard (1982–2001) : P. J. Prichard
- Derek Pringle (1978–1994) : D. R. Pringle
- Graham Pritchard (1965–1966) : G. C. Pritchard
- Stanley Proffitt (1937) : S. Proffitt
- Syd Puddefoot (1922–1923) : S. C. Puddefoot
- George Pullinger (1949–1950) : G. R. Pullinger
- James Purves (1960–1961) : J. H. Purves

== Q ==
- Arnold Quick (1936–1952) : A. B. Quick
- Stan Quin (1924) : S. E. V. Quin
- Rob Quiney (2013) : R. J. Quiney
- Matt Quinn (2016–2020) : M. R. Quinn

== R ==
- Max Raison (1928–1930) : M. Raison
- Kasun Rajitha (2025) : C. A. K. Rajitha
- Roy Ralph (1953–1961) : L. H. R. Ralph
- Arnold Read (1904–1911) : A. H. Read
- Hopper Read (1933–1935) : H. D. Read
- Ian Redpath (1987) : I. Redpath
- Dan Reese (1906) : D. Reese
- Bill Reeves (1897–1921) : W. Reeves
- Will Rhodes (2016) : W. M. H. Rhodes
- Bob Richards (1967–1970) : R. J. Richards
- Jamal Richards (2022–2025) : J. A. Richards
- Charles Richardson (1914) : C. S. Richardson
- James Richardson (1924–1926) : J. V. Richardson
- Percy Richardson (1912) : P. J. Richardson
- Ken Rickards (1953) : K. R. Rickards
- Henry Riding (1921) : H. W. Riding
- Gerald Ridley (1922–1926) : G. V. N. Ridley
- Frank Rist (1934–1953) : F. H. Rist
- Alex Roberts (2008) : A. Roberts
- Darren Robinson (1993–2003) : D. D. J. Robinson
- Douglas Robinson (1908) : D. C. Robinson
- Ralf Robinson (1912) : R. H. Robinson
- Grant Roelofsen (2022–2026) : G. Roelofsen
- Robert Rollins (1992–1999) : R. J. Rollins
- Adam Rossington (2022–2025) : A. M. Rossington
- Charles Round (1921) : C. J. Round
- Francis Rowe (1882–1895) : F. E. Rowe
- George Rowley (1926) : G. W. Rowley
- Jack Russell (1908–1930) : C. A. G. Russell
- Edward Russell (1898–1910) : A. E. Russell
- Thomas Russell (1888–1905) : T. M. Russell
- Hamish Rutherford (2013) : H. D. Rutherford
- Jesse Ryder (2014–2016) : J. D. Ryder
- Josh Rymell (2021–2022) : J. S. Rymell

== S ==
- Sadiq Mohammad (1970) : Sadiq Mohammad
- Martin Saggers (2007) : M. J. Saggers
- Gary Sainsbury (1979–1980) : G. E. Sainsbury
- Norman Saint (1920–1923) : N. H. Saint
- Matt Salisbury (2013–2015) : M. E. T. Salisbury
- Saleem Malik (1991–1993) : Saleem Malik
- Daniel Sams (2022–2024) : D. R. Sams
- Les Savill (1953–1961) : L. A. Savill
- Graham Saville (1963–1974) : G. J. Saville
- Denis Sayers (1967) : D. Sayers
- Fred Scoulding (1912–1920) : F. J. Scoulding
- Cyril Searle (1947) : C. J. Searle
- Leslie Sears (1925) : L. D. Sears
- Derek Semmence (1962) : D. J. Semmence
- Edward Sewell (1902–1904) : E. H. D. Sewell
- Adam Seymour (1988–1991) : A. C. H. Seymour
- Owais Shah (2011–2013) : O. A. Shah
- Nadeem Shahid (1989–1994) : N. Shahid
- Zoheb Sharif (2001–2004) : Z. K. Sharif
- Robert Sharp (1925–1928) : R. H. Sharp
- Roy Sheffield (1929–1936) : J. R. Sheffield
- Howard Sherman (1967–1969) : H. R. Sherman
- Richard Shorter (1927–1929) : R. N. Shorter
- Peter Siddle (2018–2021) : P. M. Siddle
- Ivor Skinner (1950) : I. J. Skinner
- Geoff Smith (1955–1966) : G. J. Smith
- George Smith (1929–1930) : G. W. O. Smith
- Greg Smith (2012–2015) : G. M. Smith
- Harry Smith (1912–1922) : H. W. Smith
- Tom Smith (1929–1935) : H. T. O. Smith
- Neil Smith (1973–1982) : N. Smith
- Peter Smith (1929–1951) : T. P. B. Smith
- Ray Smith (1934–1956) : R. Smith
- Shane Snater (2018–2026) : S. Snater
- Tim Southee (2011) : T. G. Southee
- Don Spencer (1938–1948) : W. G. Spencer
- Peter Spicer (1962–1963) : P. A. Spicer
- Fred Spinks (1926) : E. F. Spinks
- Harold Spurr (1923) : H. Spurr
- Ernest Stanley (1950–1952) : E. A. W. Stanley
- Anthony Stanyard (1960) : A. R. Stanyard
- Barry Stead (1962) : B. Stead (Note: Stead never actually appeared in a match for Essex. He was selected to play in the match v Oxford University starting on 13 June 1962, but he chose instead to play for Nottinghamshire 2nd XI v Worcestershire 2nd XI starting on the same day. He was on the Essex team sheet and thus appears on the scorecard of the Essex v Oxford University match despite not participating in the game.)
- Mark Steketee (2022) : M. T. Steketee
- John Stephenson (1934–1939) : J. W. A. Stephenson
- John Stephenson (1985–2004) : J. P. Stephenson
- Tony Steward (1964–1965) : E. A. W. Steward
- Dale Steyn (2005) : D. W. Steyn
- Frank Street (1898–1899) : F. Street
- Benjamin Strutton (1914–1919) : B. T. Strutton
- Scott Styris (2010–2011) : S. B. Styris
- Peter Such (1990–2001) : P. M. Such
- George Sutton (1912) : G. T. Sutton
- Charles Swann (1912) : C. F. Swann
- Basil Swyer (1923) : B. J. Swyer

== T ==
- Tanveer Sikandar (2014) : Tanveer Sikandar
- Alf Taylor (1923) : A. G. Taylor
- Brian Taylor (1949–1973) : B. Taylor
- Callum Taylor (2015–2018) : C. J. Taylor
- John Taylor (1960–1965) : J. F. Taylor
- Reginald Taylor (1931–1946) : R. M. Taylor
- Ernest Tedder (1946) : E. C. Tedder
- Ryan ten Doeschate (2003–2021) : R. N. ten Doeschate
- Noah Thain (2023–2026) : N. R. M. Thain
- Kevin Thomas (1990) : K. O. Thomas
- David Thompson (1999–2000) : D. J. J. Thompson
- Eddie Thompson (1926–1929) : E. C. Thompson
- Hubert Thorn (1928) : H. W. Thorn
- Nick Thornicroft (2005) : N. D. Thornicroft
- Raymond Toole (2022) : R. Toole
- Percy Toone (1912–1922) : P. Toone
- Don Topley (1985–1994) : T. D. Topley
- Reece Topley (2011–2015) : R. J. W. Topley
- Gilbert Tosetti (1898–1905) : G. Tosetti
- Evelyn Toulmin (1899–1912) : E. M. O. Toulmin
- Miles Townsend (1910) : A. F. M. Townsend
- Claude Treglown (1922–1928) : C. J. H. Treglown
- Bert Tremlin (1900–1919) : B. Tremlin
- Stanley Arthur Trick (1905–1919) : S. A. Trick
- Lonwabo Tsotsobe (2011) : L. L. Tsotsobe
- Alex Tudor (2005–2008) : A. J. Tudor
- Arthur Turner (1897–1910) : A. J. Turner
- Stuart Turner (1965–1986) : S. Turner
- Walter Turner (1899–1926) : W. M. F. Turner
- Percy Turrall (1927) : P. W. Turrall

== U ==
- Frederick Unwin (1932–1950) : F. S. Unwin
- Jim Unwin (1932–1939) : E. J. Unwin

== V ==
- James Valiant (1912) : J. Valiant
- Henry van Straubenzee (1938) : H. H. van Straubenzee
- Kishen Velani (2012–2016) : K. S. Velani
- Nicholas Vere-Hodge (1936–1939) : N. Vere-Hodge
- Frank Vigar (1938–1954) : F. H. Vigar
- Murali Vijay (2018) : M. Vijay

== W ==
- John Waddington (1931) : J. E. W. Waddington
- Tom Wade (1929–1950) : T. H. Wade
- Neil Wagner (2017–2018) : N. Wagner
- Hugh Wagstaff (1920–1921) : H. Wagstaff
- Matthew Walker (2008–2011) : M. J. Walker
- Ken Wallace (1967–1972) : K. W. Wallace
- Paul Walter (2016–2026) : P. I. Walter
- Tim Walton (1999) : T. C. Walton
- Brian Ward (1967–1973) : B. Ward
- Geoff Ward (1950) : G. H. Ward
- Brian Warsop (1931–1932) : B. Warsop
- Alfred Waterman (1937–1938) : A. G. Waterman
- David Watkins (1949–1954) : D. Watkins
- Arthur Watson (1913–1914) : A. C. Watson
- Charles Watts (1928) : C. J. M. Watts
- Hubert Waugh (1919–1929) : H. P. Waugh
- Mark Waugh (1988–2002) : M. E. Waugh
- Beau Webster (2023) : B. J. Webster
- Gordon West (1949–1953) : G. H. S. West
- Leslie West (1928) : L. H. West
- Mervyn Westfield (2005–2010) : M. S. Westfield
- Tom Westley (2006–2026) : T. Westley
- Adam Wheater (2007–2022) : A. J. A. Wheater
- Henry Whitcombe (1922) : H. M. Whitcombe
- Philip Whitcombe (1922) : P. S. Whitcombe
- Robbie White (2019) : R. G. White
- Denys Wilcox (1928–1947) : D. R. Wilcox
- John Wilcox (1964–1967) : J. W. T. Wilcox
- Charles Williams, Baron Williams of Elvel (1954–1959) : C. C. P. Williams
- Herbert Williams (1919–1920) : H. R. H. Williams
- Neil Williams (1995–1998) : N. F. Williams
- Charl Willoughby (2012) : C. M. Willoughby
- Danny Wilson (1996–1998) : D. G. Wilson
- Jack Winslade (2015) : J. R. Winslade
- Dale Womersley (1910) : L. D. Womersley (Note: Womersley, whose father also named Dale played lawn tennis competitively, played a single first-class match for the team in 1910, scoring nine runs. Born at Fryerning near Ingatestone and educated at Marlborough College, he played cricket at school and club matches for the Gentlemen of Essex team and Free Foresters. His father and brother also played cricket, although neither played at first-class level. Womersley died at Chelmsford in 1971 aged 79.)
- Albert Wright (1931–1934) : A. E. Wright
- Chris Wright (2007–2011) : C. J. C. Wright
- John Wright (1962–1967) : J. V. Wright
- Roger Wrightson (1965–1967) : R. W. Wrightson
- Norman Wykes (1925–1936) : N. G. Wykes

== Y ==
- Umesh Yadav (2023) : U. T. Yadav
- Sailor Young (1898–1912) : H. I. Young

== Z ==
- Adam Zampa (2018–2019) : A. Zampa
- Ali Zeb (2026) : A. Zeb

== See also ==
- List of Essex cricket captains

== Bibliography ==
- Pracy D (2023) Gentlemen and players of Essex: the amateur and professional cricketers of Essex County Cricket Club, 1876–1979. (Available online at The Association of Cricket Statisticians and Historians. Retrieved 11 June 2025.)
