= List of Essex cricket captains =

Essex County Cricket Club was officially founded on 14 January 1876. Essex's team was elevated to first-class status in 1894 and the club joined the County Championship in 1895. It is one of eighteen county teams in England and Wales that play first-class cricket. The player appointed club captain leads the team in all fixtures except if unavailable.

- A. P. Lucas (1894)
- H. G. P. Owen (1895–1902)
- C. J. Kortright (1903)
- F. L. Fane (1904–1906)
- C. P. McGahey (1907–1910)
- J. W. H. T. Douglas (1911–1928)
- H. M. Morris (1929–1932)
- T. N. Pearce (1933–1938, 1946–1950)
- D. R. Wilcox (1933–1939)
- J. W. A. Stephenson (1939)
- F. S. Unwin (1939)
- D. J. Insole (1950–1960)
- T. E. Bailey (1961–1966)
- B. Taylor (1967–1973)
- K. W. R. Fletcher (1974–1985; 1988)
- G. A. Gooch (1986–1987; 1989–1994)
- P. Prichard (1995–1998)
- N. Hussain (1999)
- R. C. Irani (2000–2007)
- M. L. Pettini (2007–2010)
- J. S. Foster (2010–2015)
- R. N. ten Doeschate (2016–2019)
- T. Westley (2020–2026)

== See also ==
- List of Essex CCC players
