= Francis Rowe =

Francis Rowe may refer to:

- Francis Rowe (Cambridge cricketer) (1859–1897), English county cricketer
- Francis Rowe (Essex cricketer) (1864–1928), English county cricketer
- Francis Rowe (politician) (1860–1939), Australian politician
- Frank Rowe (public servant) (1895–1958), Australian public servant
- F. A. P. Rowe (born 1898), English barrister

== See also ==
- Sir Francis Roe, Irish politician
- Francis Asbury Roe, admiral
- Frances M. A. Roe, army wife and memoirist
