= Arthur Martin =

Arthur Martin may refer to:

- Arthur S. Martin (died 1996), British intelligence officer and spy scandal investigator
- Arthur N. Martin (1889–1961), Canadian painter
- Arthur Patchett Martin (1851–1902), Australian writer
- Arthur Martin (cricketer) (1888–1958), English cricketer
- Arthur Anderson Martin (1876–1916), New Zealand surgeon
- Arthur T. Martin (1903–1946), dean of the Ohio State University Moritz College of Law

== See also ==
- Arthur Martin-Leake (1874–1953), English double recipient of the Victoria Cross
