= Meston =

Meston is a family name. It may refer to:

- Alexander Meston (1898–1980), English cricketer
- Archibald Meston (1851–1924), Australian explorer
- Baron Meston, title in the Peerage of the United Kingdom
  - James Meston, 1st Baron Meston (1865-1943), British civil servant, financial expert and businessman
- Cindy Meston, Canadian clinical psychologist and professor
- Daja Wangchuk Meston (born 1970), American author and Tibet activist
- John Meston (1914–1979), American radio and television writer
- Petrie Meston (1916-1963), provincial politician from Alberta, Canada
- Robert Meston, 19th-century Australian politician
- Sam Meston (1882-1960), English cricketer
- Sammy Meston (1902–1953), English professional footballer
- Samuel Meston (1872–1948), English professional footballer, father of Sammy
- Stanley Clark Meston (1910-1992), American architect
- William Meston (1688?–1745), Scottish poet
