= Hyndson =

Hyndson is a surname. Notable people with the surname include:

- James Hyndson (1892–1935), English cricketer
- Robert Hyndson (1894–1943), South African-born English cricketer
