= George Rowley =

George Rowley may refer to:

- George Rowley (academic) (1782–1836), Dean and Master of University College, Oxford and Vice-Chancellor of Oxford University
- George Rowley (entrepreneur) (born 1964), British entrepreneur
- George Rowley (cricketer) (1896–1953), English cricketer
- George Dawson Rowley (1822–1878), English amateur ornithologist
