= Charles Mercer =

Charles Mercer may refer to:

- Charles F. Mercer (1778–1858), American politician and lawyer from Virginia
- Charles E. Mercer (1917–1988), Canadian-American author, editor and journalist
- Charles Mercer (cricketer) (1896–1965), English cricketer
