= Warsop (disambiguation) =

Warsop is a town in Nottinghamshire, England.

Warsop may also refer to:

- Warsop railway station, a defunct railway station in Nottinghamshire, England
- Warsop Urban District (1894–1974), a defunct urban district in Nottinghamshire, England
- Brian Warsop (1904–1993), English cricketer
- Richard Warsop (born 1781), English cricketer, brother of Thomas
- Thomas Warsop (born 1778), English cricketer, brother of Richard

== See also ==
- Church Warsop, a village in Nottinghamshire, England
- Warsop Vale, a village in Nottinghamshire, England
