= Missen =

Missen may refer to:

== Surname ==
- Alan Missen (1925–1986), Australian politician
- Edward Missen (1875–1927), English cricketer
- François Missen (born 1933), French journalist

== Places ==
- Missen-Wilhams, is a municipality in the district of Oberallgäu in Bavaria
- Missen Ridge, is a long, ice-covered ridge situated south of Davis Ice Piedmont, on the north coast of Victoria Land, Antarctica
