= George Sutton =

George Sutton may refer to:

== Politicians and nobility ==
- George Manners-Sutton (1751–1804), British politician
- Lord George Manners-Sutton (1723–1783), born Lord George Manners, British nobleman and politician
- Sir George Morris Sutton (1834–1913), Prime Minister of Natal, 1903–1905
- Sir George Sutton, 1st Baronet, of Castle House (1869–1947), Sutton Baronet
- Sir George Sutton, 1st Baronet, of Beckenham (1856–1934), Sutton Baronet

== Sportspeople ==
- George Sutton (boxer) (1922–1995), Welsh boxer
- George Sutton (cricketer) (1887–1949), English cricketer
- George H. Sutton (1870–1938), American, and handless, carom billiards player

== Others ==
- George Sutton (judge) (George Gerard Sutton) (1880–1955), South African judge
- George Miksch Sutton (1898–1982), American ornithologist and bird artist
- George Lowe Sutton (1872–1964), Australian agricultural scientist and breeder of wheat
