= International cricket in 1934 =

International cricket season

The 1934 International cricket season was from April 1934 to August 1934.

== Season overview ==
International tours
Start date	Home team	Away team	Results [Matches]			
Start date	Home team	Away team	Test	ODI	FC	LA
2 June 1934	England	England Rest	—	—	1–0 [1]	—
8 June 1934	England	Australia	1–2 [5]	—	—	—
30 July 1934	Netherlands	England	—	—	0–1 [3]	—
4 August 1934	Ireland	Marylebone	—	—	0–0 [1]	—

== June ==
=== Test Trial in England ===
Three-day match
No.	Date	Home captain	Away captain	Venue	Result
Match	2–5 June	Bob Wyatt	Maurice Turnbull	Lord's, London	England by 10 wickets

=== Australia in England ===
The Ashes Test series
No.	Date	Home captain	Away captain	Venue	Result
Test 233	8–12 June	Cyril Walters	Bill Woodfull	Trent Bridge, Nottingham	Australia by 238 runs
Test 234	22–25 June	Bob Wyatt	Bill Woodfull	Lord's, London	England by an innings and 38 runs
Test 235	6–10 July	Bob Wyatt	Bill Woodfull	Old Trafford Cricket Ground, Manchester	Match drawn
Test 236	20–24 July	Bob Wyatt	Bill Woodfull	Headingley Cricket Ground, Leeds	Match drawn
Test 237	18–22 August	Bob Wyatt	Bill Woodfull	Kennington Oval, London	Australia by 562 runs

== July ==
=== England in Netherlands ===
Two-day match series
No.	Date	Home captain	Away captain	Venue	Result
Match 1	30–31 July	Not mentioned	KB Stanley	The Hague	Free Foresters by 181 runs
Match 2	1–2 August	G Hamburger	KB Stanley	Laren	Match drawn
Match 3	4–5 August	Not mentioned	KB Stanley	Amsterdam	Match drawn

== August ==
=== MCC in Ireland ===
Three-day match
No.	Date	Home captain	Away captain	Venue	Result
Match	4–7 August	James MacDonald	Colin McIver	College Park, Dublin	Match drawn
