= Grinter =

Grinter may refer to:

== Surname ==
- Barry Grinter (born 1951), Australian rules footballer
- Brad F. Grinter (1922–1993), American film director and actor
- Rebecca Grinter, American computer scientist and professor
- Rod Grinter (born 1965), Australian rules footballer
- Tray Grinter (1885–1966), English cricketer

== Other uses ==
- Grinter Place, American historic house of Kansas City, Kansas
