= Darsie Watson =

English cricketer

Personal information
- Born: 15 July 1889; Teddington, Middlesex, England
- Died: 19 November 1964 (aged 75); Charing Cross, London, England
- Batting: Right-handed

Domestic team information
- Years: Team
- 1920: Sussex

Career statistics
Competition	First-class
Matches	1
Runs scored	3
Batting average	1.50
100s/50s	0/0
Top score	3
Catches/stumpings	0/–
- Source: Cricinfo, 28 November 2011

Darsie Watson (15 July 1889 – 19 November 1964) was an English cricketer. Watson was a right-handed batsman. He was born at Teddington, Middlesex and educated at Marlborough College, Wiltshire.

Watson made a single first-class appearance for Sussex against Essex at the County Ground, Hove in the 1920 County Championship. In Sussex's first-innings, he was dismissed for a duck by Johnny Douglas, while in their second-innings he was dismissed for 3 runs by Percy Toone. This was his only major appearance for Sussex.

He died at Charing Cross, London on 19 November 1964.
