= Melluish =

Melluish is a surname. Notable people with the surname include:

- Gordon Melluish (1906–1977), English cricketer
- Mike Melluish (1932–2014), English cricketer and cricket administrator

== See also ==
- Mellish
