= Turrall =

Turrall is a surname. Notable people with the surname include:

- Jennifer Turrall (born 1960), Australian former competitive swimmer
- Percy Turrall (1883–1941), English cricketer
- Thomas Turrall (1885–1964), English recipient of the Victoria Cross
