= Frank Street =

Frank Street may refer to:

- Frank Street (cricketer), English cricketer
- Frank Street Jr., American chess player
