= Barnfather =

Barnfather is an English surname. Notable people with the surname include:

- Percy Barnfather (1879–1951), English footballer
- James Barnfather (1896–1957), English cricketer
- George Barnfather, fictional policeman on Homicide: Life on the Street
