= Ronald Evans =

Ronald or Ron Evans may refer to:

- Ronald Evans (astronaut) (1933–1990), American naval officer and astronaut
- Ronald Evans (rugby league) (1933–2010), English rugby league footballer
- Ronald G. Evans (1915–1992), American businessman and politician
- Ronald M. Evans (born 1949), American professor and biologist
- Ron Evans (1939–2007), Australian rules footballer and executive
- Ron J. Evans (1926–2004), Australian rules footballer
- Ron Evans (politician) (born 1957), clergyman and politician in Manitoba, Canada
- Ron Evans (cricketer) (1922–1993), English cricketer
- Ron Evans (rugby union) (1941–2013), Welsh rugby union player
- Ronald Evans (swimmer), Welsh swimmer
- Ron Evans (decathlete), winner of the 1972 NCAA DI decathlon championship
