= Keith Butler =

Keith Butler may refer to:

== Sports ==
- Keith Butler (American football) (born 1956), current NFL assistant
- Keith Butler (baseball) (born 1989), American baseball player
- Keith Butler (basketball) (born 1983), basketball player formerly in the NBA D-League, see 2008 NBA Development League Draft
- Keith Butler (English cricketer) (born 1971), former English cricketer
- Keith Butler (New Zealand cricketer) (born 1933), New Zealand cricketer
- Keith Butler (cyclist) (born 1938), former British cycling champion

== Others ==
- Keith Butler (Michigan politician), American pastor and Republican politician from Michigan
- Keith Butler (Ontario politician) (1920–1977), Canadian politician
