= Herringshaw =

Herringshaw is a surname. Notable people with the surname include:

- John Herringshaw (1892–1974), English cricketer
- Thomas William Herringshaw (1858–1927), American journalist, publisher, genealogist, and biographical author
