= Bawtree (surname) =

Bawtree is a surname. Notable people with the surname include:

- Adrian Bawtree (born 1968), English composer and organist
- David Bawtree (born 1937), British naval officer
- John Bawtree (1873–1938), English cricketer
- Leonard Bawtree (1924–2014), Canadian politician
- Michael Bawtree (1937–2024), Canadian actor, director, author, and educator
