= John Bonner =

John Bonner may refer to:

- John Bonner (cricketer) (1869–1936), English cricketer
- John Tyler Bonner (1920–2019), biology professor at Princeton, specialist in slime molds
- John W. Bonner (1902–1970), governor of Montana
