= Walter Cooper =

Walter Cooper may refer to:

- Walter Cooper (mayor) (c. 1845 – 1941), 21st Mayor of Christchurch, New Zealand
- Walter Cooper (Queensland politician) (1888–1973), Australian politician
- Walter Cooper (New South Wales politician) (1842–1880)
- Walter Cooper (scientist) (born 1928), American scientist
- Walter Cooper (Essex cricketer) (fl. 1905–1910), English cricketer
- Walter Cooper (South African cricketer) (fl. 1922)
- Walter Gaze Cooper (1895–1981), British pianist, teacher and composer
