= Joseph Milner =

Joseph Milner may refer to:

- Joseph Milner (priest)
- Joseph Milner (firefighter)
- Joseph Milner (cricketer)

== See also ==
- California Joe Milner, American miner and frontier scout
