= George Pullinger =

English cricketer

Personal information
- Full name: George Richard Pullinger
- Born: 14 March 1920; Islington, London, England
- Died: 4 August 1982 (aged 62); Thurrock, Essex, England
- Batting: Right-handed
- Bowling: Right-arm fast-medium
- Role: Bowler

Domestic team information
- Years: Team
- 1949–1950: Essex

Career statistics
Competition	First-class
Matches	18
Runs scored	53
Batting average	5.88
100s/50s	0/0
Top score	14*
Balls bowled	3,117
Wickets	41
Bowling average	37.97
5 wickets in innings	1
10 wickets in match	0
Best bowling	5/54
Catches/stumpings	14/–
- Source: Cricinfo, 20 September 2011

George Richard Pullinger (14 March 1920 – 4 August 1982) was an English cricketer. Pullinger was a right-arm fast-medium bowler and tail-end right-handed batsman. He was born in Islington, London.

An amateur, Pullinger made his first-class debut for Essex against Middlesex in the 1949 County Championship as cover for Ken Preston. Available for only the first half of the 1949 season, he made fifteen further appearances. He played twice more in the 1950 season, then disappeared from first-class cricket. He often opened the bowling with Trevor Bailey. In his eighteen first-class matches he took 41 wickets at an average of 37.97, with best figures of 5/54. These figures, which were his only first-class five wicket haul, came against Somerset in 1949. A true tailender, with the bat he scored 53 runs at a batting average of 5.88, with a high score of 14 not out.

Pullinger died at Thurrock, Essex, on 4 August 1982. His obituary appeared in the 1986 edition of Wisden Cricketers' Almanack.
