= Arthur Heatley =

English cricketer

Personal information
- Full name: Arthur Edward Heatley
- Born: 25 October 1865; Brighton, Sussex, England
- Died: 1 July 1941 (aged 75); Ingrave, Essex, England
- Batting: Unknown
- Bowling: Unknown

Domestic team information
- Years: Team
- 1894: Essex

Career statistics
Competition	First-class
Matches	1
Runs scored	20
Batting average	20.00
100s/50s	–/–
Top score	13*
Balls bowled	5
Wickets	–
Bowling average	–
5 wickets in innings	–
10 wickets in match	–
Best bowling	–
Catches/stumpings	4/–
- Source: Cricinfo, 27 October 2011

Arthur Edward Heatley (25 October 1865 – 1 July 1941) was an English cricketer. Heatley's batting and bowling styles are unknown. He was born at Brighton, Sussex.

Heatley made a single first-class appearance for Essex against Yorkshire at Thrum Hall, Halifax in 1894. In this match, he scored 7 runs in Essex's first-innings before being dismissed by Thomas Foster, while in their second-innings he ended unbeaten on 13. Yorkshire won the match by 7 wickets.

He died at Ingrave, Essex on 1 July 1941.
