= Herbert Burrell =

English cricketer

Personal information
- Full name: Herbert John Edwin Burrell
- Born: 15 November 1866; Kirtling, Cambridgeshire, England
- Died: 22 May 1949 (aged 82); Trumpington, Cambridgeshire, England
- Batting: Right-handed
- Role: Bowler

Domestic team information
- Years: Team
- 1889: Oxford University
- 1895: Essex

Career statistics
Competition	FC
Matches	3
Runs scored	15
Batting average	3.00
100s/50s	0/0
Top score	10
Balls bowled	153
Wickets	2
Bowling average	39.00
5 wickets in innings	0
10 wickets in match	0
Best bowling	1/37
Catches/stumpings	0/0
- Source: Cricinfo, 27 July 2013

Herbert John Edwin Burrell (15 November 1866 – 22 May 1949) was an English cleric and cricketer. He played in first-class cricket games for Oxford University in 1889 and for Essex in 1895.

== Life ==
The son of John Burrell of Kirtling, Cambridgeshire, Burrell was educated at Charterhouse School and matriculated at Magdalen College, Oxford in 1885. He graduated B.A. in 1889 and M.A. in 1892.

Burrell was ordained deacon in 1890, and priest of the Church of England in 1891. He then attended Cuddesdon Theological College. He was chaplain to John Festing, Bishop of St Albans, in 1894, and became vicar of Wigginton, Hertfordshire in 1899. He was rector of Balsham, Cambridgeshire, 1910–34.

During the First World War Burrell was a secretary and orderly in Balsham Red Cross Hospital.

His younger brother John also played first-class cricket.

Burrell became a Fellow of the Society of Antiquaries of London.
