= Ronald Franklin =

English cricketer

Ronald Franklin (9 September 1904 – 28 September 1982) was an English cricketer. He was a right-handed batsman and a right-arm medium-pace bowler who played for Essex. He was born in Ford End and died in Prestwood.

Franklin made just one first-class appearance, against Leicestershire in the 1924 County Championship, when he was just nineteen years old, playing alongside his brother. He scored just one run during the match, and took one wicket with the ball. Franklin was immediately dropped from the team.

Franklin's brother, Henry, played first-class cricket between 1921 and 1931.
