= Herbert Brunwin =

English cricketer

Herbert Brunwin (28 April 1912 — 17 January 2017) was an English cricketer. He was a right-handed batsman and a right-arm medium-fast bowler who played for Essex during the 1937 season. Brunwin was born in Layer-de-la-Haye and died in Colchester.

In the single first-class match in which he played, Brunwin, a tailender, made two runs before a first-innings declaration in an innings in which team-mates Reginald Taylor, Jack O'Connor and Stan Nichols each scored centuries. The game finished in an innings victory for the Essex side.
