= Jim Unwin =

British Lions & England international rugby union player & cricketer

- Born: Ernest James Unwin; 18 September 1912 Birdbrook, Essex, England
- Died: 23 November 2003 (aged 91) Perth, Scotland

Rugby union career
- Position: Wing
Senior career
| Years | Team | Apps | (Points) |
| 1930-1934 | Sandhurst Military Academy | - | (-) |
| 1931 | Devonport Services | | |
| 1932-1946 | Rosslyn Park | | |
| 1936-1938 | British Lions - Non Test | 21 | (52) |
International career
| Years | Team | Apps | (Points) |
| 1936-1938 | British Lions - Tests | 2 | (3) |
| 1937-1938 | England | 4 | (12) |

Ernest James Unwin (18 September 1912 – 23 November 2003) was an English rugby union international. He also played first-class cricket for Essex.

Unwin, a pacy winger and capable drop-kicker, won his first cap for England in their 1937 Home Nations Championship win over Scotland, scoring a try to help them claim the Triple Crown. He had previously toured Argentina with the British Lions in 1936 and in 1938 travelled to South Africa with the British Lions, playing two Tests. Also in 1938, he appeared in all three internationals in that year's Home Nations Championship.

Unwin played seven games for the Barbarians scoring six tries between 1936 and 1942.

An amateur, he played his club rugby for Rosslyn Park. World War II ended Unwin's sporting career as he joined the army and remained with them until his retirement in 1949, having reached the rank of Lieutenant-Colonel.

On the cricket field, Unwin made seven first-class appearances with Essex throughout the 1930s. The Haileybury educated sportsman also played a bit of cricket for Suffolk in the Minor Counties His brother Frederick Unwin was a more successful cricketer, playing 53 first-class matches for Essex.
