= Neil Smith (cricketer, born 1949) =

English cricketer

Neil Smith (1 April 1949 – 4 March 2003) was an English first-class cricketer, who played eight First-Class matches for Yorkshire County Cricket Club in 1970 and 1971, before moving to Essex where he enjoyed a successful county career until 1981. He also played for Cheshire in the Minor Counties, appearing in occasional List A one day games for them in 1988 and 1989.

== Early life and career ==
Born at Ossett, Yorkshire, England, Smith had hopes of replacing the long-serving Jimmy Binks behind the stumps for Yorkshire, but found his place taken by the then 18-year-old, David Bairstow. Smith moved to Essex instead to replace Brian Taylor, and established himself in the side in 1973. He had a good pair of hands and, although not at first sight the most nimble of movers, was a key part of the first Essex side to win a trophy. He lost his place in 1981 to David East, captained the Essex Second XI for a season, and then returned to Yorkshire for a business career.

In 187 first-class matches, he took 395 catches and 51 stumpings, and scored 3,336 runs as a pugnacious right-handed batsman. In 171 one-day games, he took 124 catches and 23 stumpings, and scored 851 runs at 10.50, occasionally used as a pinch hitter up the batting order.

Smith died of cancer at age 53 in March 2003, at Dewsbury, Yorkshire.
