= Basil Swyer =

English cricketer

Basil Swyer (6 June 1898 — 7 July 1964) was an English cricketer who played for Essex. He was born in West Ham and died in Sherwood, Nottingham.

Swyer made a single first-class appearance, in a County Championship match in 1923 against Kent, in which he bowled thirteen overs in a match which saw centuries from Kent pair Wally Hardinge and James Seymour. His efforts with both bat and ball were unspectacular, and he was immediately dropped from the team.
