= William Hubble =

English cricketer

Personal information
- Full name: William George Hubble
- Born: 20 June 1898; Leyton, Essex, England
- Died: 14 December 1978 (aged 80); Bishop's Waltham, Hampshire, England
- Batting: Left-handed
- Role: Bowler

Domestic team information
- Years: Team
- 1923: Essex

Career statistics
Competition	FC
Matches	1
Runs scored	0
Batting average
100s/50s
Top score
Balls bowled
Wickets	2
Bowling average
5 wickets in innings
10 wickets in match
Best bowling
Catches/stumpings
- Source: Cricinfo, 21 July 2013

William Hubble (20 June 1898 – 14 December 1978) was an English cricketer. He played one match for Essex in 1923.
