= Victor Jarvis =

English cricketer

Personal information
- Full name: Victor Edmund Jarvis
- Born: 30 September 1898; Hampstead, London, England
- Died: 30 April 1975 (aged 76); Stokenchurch, Buckinghamshire, England
- Batting: Right-handed
- Bowling: Slow left-arm orthodox

Domestic team information
- Years: Team
- 1925: Essex

Career statistics
Competition	First-class
Matches	2
Runs scored	44
Batting average	11.00
100s/50s	–/–
Top score	37
Balls bowled	36
Wickets	–
Bowling average	–
5 wickets in innings	–
10 wickets in match	–
Best bowling	–
Catches/stumpings	–/–
- Source: Cricinfo, 26 October 2011

Victor Edmund Jarvis (30 September 1898 – 30 April 1975) was an English cricketer. Jarvis was a right-handed batsman who bowled slow left-arm orthodox. He was born at Hampstead, London.

Jarvis made his first-class debut for Essex against Glamorgan in the 1925 County Championship. In this match, he scored 7 runs in Essex's first-innings before being dismissed by Frank Ryan, while in their second-innings he was dismissed for a duck by the same bowler. He made a second and final first-class in Essex's following County Championship match against Yorkshire. He made 37 runs in Essex's first-innings of the match, before being dismissed by Wilfred Rhodes. In their second-innings, he was dismissed for a duck by Abe Waddington.

He died on 30 April 1975 at Stokenchurch, Buckinghamshire.
