= Ivor Skinner =

English cricketer (1928–2015)

Personal information
- Full name: Ivor John Skinner
- Born: 1 April 1928; Walthamstow, Essex, England
- Died: 9 September 2015 (aged 87); Truro, Cornwall, England
- Batting: Right-handed
- Bowling: Right-arm fast-medium

Domestic team information
- Years: Team
- 1956–1959: Cornwall
- 1950: Essex

Career statistics
Competition	First-class
Matches	13
Runs scored	28
Batting average	2.00
100s/50s	–/–
Top score	7*
Balls bowled	1,458
Wickets	21
Bowling average	38.47
5 wickets in innings	–
10 wickets in match	–
Best bowling	4/56
Catches/stumpings	5/–
- Source: Cricinfo, 21 November 2011

Ivor John Skinner (1 April 1928 – 9 September 2015) was an English cricketer. Skinner was a right-handed batsman who bowled right-arm fast-medium. He was born at Walthamstow, Essex.

Skinner made his first-class debut for Essex against Glamorgan in the 1950 County Championship. He made twelve further first-class appearances in that season, the last of which came against Kent. In his twelve first-class appearances, he took 21 wickets at an average of 38.47, with best figures of 4/56. A tailend batsman in the truest sense of the word, Skinner scored just 28 runs at a batting average of 2.00, with a high score of 7 not out. This was his only season of first-class cricket with Essex, with him leaving the county at the end of it.

Skinner later played for Cornwall in the Minor Counties Championship, making his debut for the county against the Somerset Second XI in 1956. He played Minor counties cricket for Cornwall from 1956 to 1959, making ten appearances.

Skinner died in Truro on 9 September 2015, at the age of 87.
