= Percy Richardson =

English cricketer

Personal information
- Full name: Percy John Richardson
- Born: 2 April 1891; Snaresbrook, Essex, England
- Died: 23 March 1964 (aged 72); Reigate, Surrey, England

Domestic team information
- Years: Team
- 1912: Essex
- 1912: Cambridge University

Career statistics
Competition	First-class
Matches	3
Runs scored	44
Batting average	11.00
100s/50s	0/0
Top score	21
Balls bowled	30
Wickets	0
Bowling average	–
5 wickets in innings	–
10 wickets in match	–
Best bowling	–
Catches/stumpings	2/–
- Source: Cricinfo, 27 December 2010

Percy John Richardson (2 April 1891 – 23 March 1964) was an English cricketer. He was born at Snaresbrook, Essex.

Richardson made his first-class debut in 1912 for Cambridge University against HDG Leveson-Gower's XI at The Saffrons in Eastbourne. This was the only first-class match he played for the university. In the same season he played 2 first-class matches for Essex against Hampshire in the County Championship and the touring South Africans. In his 3 first-class matches, he scored 44 runs at a batting average of 11.00, with a high score of 21.

He died at Reigate, Surrey on 23 March 1964.
