= Gordon West (cricketer) =

English cricketer

Gordon West (7 August 1923 – December 2002) was an English cricketer. He was a right-handed batsman who played first-class cricket for Essex. He was born in Upton Park and died in Southend-on-Sea.

West played Minor Counties cricket between 1949 and 1955, though he only played two first-class matches, the first a University Match against Cambridge University. West's second and final first-class match came against a Commonwealth XI, consisting mostly of foreign first-class and West Indian Test players.
