= Arthur N. Martin =

Canadian painter

Arthur N. Martin (August 31, 1889 – 1961) was a Canadian painter.

An architect, Martin pursued painting and exhibited regularly in the annual art presentations of the Canadian National Exhibition in Toronto. He studied at Jarvis Collegiate Institute in Toronto. A retrospective of his work was exhibited at Art Gallery of Cobourg, Cobourg, Ontario in 1977.
