= Francis Loveday =

English cricketer

Personal information
- Full name: Francis Alfred Loveday
- Born: 14 September 1892; Hackney, London, England
- Died: 18 October 1954 (aged 62); North Walsham, Norfolk, England
- Batting: Left-handed
- Role: Batsman

Domestic team information
- Years: Team
- 1921–1923: Essex

Career statistics
| Competition | FC |
|---|---|
| Matches | 7 |
| Runs scored | 321 |
| Batting average | 22.92 |
| 100s/50s | 0/3 |
| Top score | 81 |
| Balls bowled |
| Wickets |
| Bowling average |
| 5 wickets in innings |
| 10 wickets in match |
| Best bowling |
| Catches/stumpings | 2/0 |
- Source: Cricinfo, 21 July 2013

Francis Loveday (14 September 1892 – 18 October 1954) was an English cricketer. He played for Essex between 1921 and 1923.
