= John Inns =

English cricketer

Personal information
- Full name: John Herbert Inns
- Born: 30 March 1878; Writtle, Essex, England
- Died: 14 May 1905 (aged 27); Leyton, Essex, England
- Batting: Unknown
- Bowling: Unknown
- Role: Occasional wicket-keeper

Domestic team information
- Years: Team
- 1898–1904: Essex

Career statistics
Competition	First-class
Matches	10
Runs scored	73
Batting average	6.63
100s/50s	–/–
Top score	28
Balls bowled	30
Wickets	–
Bowling average	–
5 wickets in innings	–
10 wickets in match	–
Best bowling	–
Catches/stumpings	8/–
- Source: Cricinfo, 31 October 2011

John Herbert Inns (30 March 1876 – 14 June 1905) was an English cricketer. Inns' batting and bowling styles are not known, but it is known he fielded on occasion as a wicket-keeper. He was born at Writtle, Essex.

Inns made his first-class debut for Essex against Oxford University in 1898. He played infrequently for Essex, making nine further first-class appearances, the last of which came against Middlesex in the 1904 County Championship. In his ten first-class appearances, he scored 73 runs at an average of 6.63, with a high score of 28. In the field he took 8 catches.

He died at Leyton, Essex on 14 June 1905 and was buried at Writtle.
