= Stanley Arthur Trick =

English cricketer

Stanley Arthur Trick, known as Stan Trick (3 June 1884 – 11 February 1958) was an English cricketer for Essex. Playing over five sporadic appearances between 1905 and 1919, he was a middle-order right-hand batsman. He had only modest success, with 69 runs at a batting average of only 7.66, before going on to become a colliery agent.
