= Robert Sharp (cricketer) =

English cricketer

Robert Henry Sharp (11 June 1893 – 15 March 1961) was an English cricketer. A right-arm fast-medium bowler and right-handed bat from Doncaster, Yorkshire, Sharp played first-class cricket for Essex, primarily during the 1925 County Championship. He played twelve matches that year, scoring 146 runs at 13.27 including a best of 36 not out, and took 16 wickets at 43.50. He played sporadically for two more seasons - three matches in 1926 and a single game in 1928 - before his playing career ended. He died in Bradford-on-Avon in Wiltshire.
