= Ralf Robinson =

English cricketer

Ralf Robinson (28 June 1885 – 23 August 1917) was an English cricketer. He was a wicket-keeper who played first-class cricket for Essex.

Robinson made four first-class appearances during the 1912 season, his debut coming in an innings defeat against Northamptonshire. Robinson's following games came during the next three weeks, scoring a career-best 11 not out during his final game.

Robinson, a second lieutenant during the First World War, died in Ypres at the age of 32.
