= Eshun Kalley =

English cricketer

Personal information
- Full name: Eshun Singh Kalley
- Born: 23 November 2001 (age 23); King George Hospital, Ilford, Essex, England
- Batting: Right-handed
- Bowling: Right-arm Medium
- Role: Bowler

Eshun Singh Kalley (born 23 November 2001) is an English cricketer who played for Essex and Essex 2nd XI. He is a right-handed batsman, who also bowls right-arm medium-fast pace. He made his first-class debut against Ireland on 26 May 2023 in a tour match. He was released by Essex at the end of the 2023 season.
