= Leslie West (cricketer) =

English cricketer

Personal information
- Full name: Leslie Harold West
- Born: 24 January 1905; Leytonstone, Essex, England
- Died: 12 November 1982 (aged 77); Leytonstone, Essex, England
- Batting: Right-handed

Domestic team information
- Years: Team
- 1928: Essex

Career statistics
Competition	First-class
Matches	3
Runs scored	33
Batting average	6.60
100s/50s	–/–
Top score	30
Balls bowled	–
Wickets	–
Bowling average	–
5 wickets in innings	–
10 wickets in match	–
Best bowling	–
Catches/stumpings	–/–
- Source: Cricinfo, 23 October 2011

Leslie Harold West (24 January 1905 – 12 November 1982) was an English cricketer. West was a right-handed batsman. He was born at Leytonstone, Essex.

West made his first-class debut for Essex, for whom he was invited to a trial in the 1928 County Championship against Northamptonshire. He made two further first-class appearances for the county, both in 1928 against Glamorgan and Essex. In his three appearances he scored 33 runs at an average of 6.60, with a high score of 30.

In later life he coached cricket. He died at the town of his birth on 12 November 1982 while attending a cricket dinner.
