= Alf Moule =

English cricketer and footballer

Personal information
- Full name: Alfred Samuel Moule
- Born: 31 July 1894; West Ham, Essex, England
- Died: 5 February 1973 (aged 78); Shoreham-by-Sea, Sussex, England
- Batting: Right-handed

Domestic team information
- Years: Team
- 1931–1937: Devon
- 1921–1924: Essex

Career statistics
Competition	First-class
Matches	17
Runs scored	317
Batting average	12.19
100s/50s	–/1
Top score	64
Balls bowled	6
Wickets	–
Bowling average	–
5 wickets in innings	–
10 wickets in match	–
Best bowling	–
Catches/stumpings	5/–
- Source: Cricinfo, 17 April 2011

Alfred 'Alf' Samuel Moule (31 July 1894 – 5 February 1973) was an English cricketer and footballer.

== Cricket career ==
Moule was a right-handed batsman, although his bowling style is unknown. He was born in West Ham, Essex.

Moule made his first-class debut for Essex in 1921 against Lancashire. His next first-class appearance didn't come until 1923, when he became a more regular feature in the Essex team, making 15 appearances over the 1923 and 1924 seasons. In his total of 16 first-class matches, he scored 317 runs at a batting average of 12.19, with a single half century high score of 64 which came against the touring West Indians in 1923.

Following the end of his first-class career, Moule played Minor Counties Championship cricket for Devon on three separate occasions from 1931 to 1937. He subsequently coached in Cornwwll, and later at Lancing College.

== Football career ==
Moule played in various London local leagues for West Ham Corinthians, Catford South East and Leytonstone, before joining Millwall as an amateur in March 1920. He went professional in 1921 and stayed with the club for six years, scoring 64 goals (including three hat-tricks) in 208 League appearances, playing as an inside-left, before moving to Norwich City, in the Third Division (South). He spent just one season in East Anglia, scoring 12 goals in 35 matches, before a year with Watford, where he managed to score four times in 11 games. He returned to non-League football with Margate, playing alongside future Arsenal goalkeeper and Dutch international Gerrit Keizer, where he became player-manager in August 1930.
