= Frances M. A. Roe =

American writer (1846–1920)

Frances M. A. Roe, born Frances Marie Antoinette Mack (22 August 1846 – 6 May 1920) was an American writer. She was the daughter of Ralph Gilbert Make and Mary Colton Mack of Watertown, New York. On August 19, 1871, she married U.S. Army officer Fayette Washington Roe, who ultimately became a Lieutenant Colonel, and was sent to Fort Lyon in Colorado Territory in 1871. She accompanied him and recorded her life during these years in a memoir. While her husband's career has been described as "unremarkable", Roe continues to be known on the basis of her book for the accurate picture of Army life it painted.

Roe died in Port Orange, Florida, and was buried with her husband at Arlington National Cemetery, in Arlington, Virginia.

== Works ==
- Army letters from an officer's wife, 1871–1888, 1909
