= Tom Smith (cricketer, born 1906) =

English cricketer

Harry Thomas Oliver Smith (5 March 1906 — 13 July 1995) was an English cricketer. He was a right-handed batsman and a right-arm medium-fast bowler who played for Essex. He was born in Warley, Essex and died in Surrey.

Smith's first-class career began in 1929, making a decent performance in his debut, putting on fifteen with the bat and taking figures of 3–33 with the ball. Smith became an occasional player in the tailend order for Essex, though he only made two County Championship appearances in 1930. Becoming slightly more frequent in his play come 1931, he played consistently in the tailend with namesake Peter Smith, who by this time was still in the opening years of a career which would span 22 years.

While Smith continued into 1932, his form became patchy, and in his final game of the season he bowled poorly in an innings defeat and in the next three seasons made just six first-class appearances for Essex. Smith took three five-wicket hauls in his career with best figures of 6–56.
