= Harry Mortlock =

English cricketer

Personal information
- Full name: Harry Clive Mortlock
- Born: 13 October 1892; Hackney, London, England
- Died: 29 March 1963 (aged 70); Brentwood, Essex, England
- Batting: Right-handed
- Role: Bowler

Domestic team information
- Years: Team
- 1912–1921: Essex

Career statistics
Competition	FC
Matches	4
Runs scored	32
Batting average	8.00
100s/50s	0/0
Top score	26
Balls bowled	582
Wickets	7
Bowling average	54.28
5 wickets in innings	1
10 wickets in match	0
Best bowling	5/104
Catches/stumpings	6/0
- Source: Cricinfo, 22 July 2013

Harry Mortlock (13 October 1892 – 29 March 1963) was an English cricketer. He played for Essex between 1912 and 1921.
