= Lewis Lywood =

English cricketer (1906–1971)

Personal information
- Full name: Lewis William Lywood
- Born: 23 December 1906; Walthamstow, London, England
- Died: 31 October 1971 (aged 64); Caterham, Surrey, England
- Batting: Right-handed
- Bowling: Right-arm fast-medium

Domestic team information
- Years: Team
- 1930: Essex
- 1927–1928: Surrey

Career statistics
Competition	First-class
Matches	4
Runs scored	19
Batting average	3.80
100s/50s	–/–
Top score	7
Balls bowled	528
Wickets	3
Bowling average	86.66
5 wickets in innings	–
10 wickets in match	–
Best bowling	1/7
Catches/stumpings	–/–
- Source: Cricinfo, 24 October 2011

Lewis William Lywood (23 December 1906 – 31 October 1971) was an English cricketer. Lywood was a right-handed batsman who bowled right-arm fast-medium. He was born at Caterham, Surrey.

Lywood made his first-class debut for Surrey against Oxford University in 1927. He made a further first-class appearance for Surrey against Gloucestershire in the 1928 County Championship. He later joined Essex, making two first-class appearances for the county in 1930 against Worcestershire and Northamptonshire. His brief first-class career had little success, with him taking just 3 wickets at an average of 86.66, with best figures of 1/7. With the bat, he scored 19 runs at a batting average of 3.80, with a high score of 7.

He died at Caterham, Surrey on 31 October 1971.
