= Norman Saint =

English cricketer

Cricket information
- Batting: Right-handed
- Bowling: Left-arm medium

Career statistics
Competition	First-class
Matches	44
Runs scored	757
Batting average	11.64
100s/50s	0/0
Top score	36
Balls bowled	1,077
Wickets	17
Bowling average	47.05
5 wickets in innings	0
10 wickets in match	0
Best bowling	3/32
Catches/stumpings	10/–
- Source: Cricinfo, 8 November 2022

Norman Hunt Saint (22 April 1901 – 15 August 1930) was an English cricketer who played first-class cricket for Essex in the early 1920s.

Saint made his debut against Northamptonshire in May 1920, scoring 15 in his only innings and not bowling a ball. In this match the hat-trick was performed by Northamptonshire's Claud Woolley; coincidentally Saint's second game, against Oxford University, also saw a hat-trick performed, this time by Oxford's Reginald Bettington.

Saint played a number of further games in 1920, albeit with relatively little success, his highest score and indeed career best being the 36 (out of 145) he made in an innings defeat by Sussex in early August; he also had a run of useful scores of 20 or 30 later that month. 1921 saw him take his maiden wicket, that of Worcestershire's Frederick Pearson, and he finished the year with 14 wickets at 46 including a career-best 3–32 against Somerset.

He did not play at all in 1922, but returned for six more games the following year. However, a return of only three wickets – all against Cambridge University – at over 46 runs apiece and 88 runs in ten innings was not impressive, and the match against Yorkshire in July proved to be his last.

Saint was born in Tollington Park, Islington, London; he died aged just 29 in Whitechapel, also in London.
