= Ernest Tedder =

English cricketer

Personal information
- Full name: Ernest Cranfield Tedder
- Born: 5 September 1915; Woodford Green, Essex, England
- Died: 9 September 1972 (aged 57); Ipswich, Suffolk, England
- Batting: Right-handed

Domestic team information
- Years: Team
- 1946: Essex

Career statistics
Competition	First-class
Matches	8
Runs scored	208
Batting average	14.85
100s/50s	–/1
Top score	55
Balls bowled	–
Wickets	–
Bowling average	–
5 wickets in innings	–
10 wickets in match	–
Best bowling	–
Catches/stumpings	1/–
- Source: Cricinfo, 26 October 2011

Ernest Cranfield Tedder (5 September 1915 – 9 September 1972) was an English cricketer. Tedder was a right-handed batsman. He was born at Woodford Green, Essex.

Tedder served in World War II with the Royal Air Force Volunteer Reserve, initially holding the rank of acting pilot officer. He was later promoted to flying officer in July 1941. Following the war, Tedder played first-class cricket for Essex against Somerset in the 1946 County Championship. He made seven further first-class appearances in that season, with his final appearance coming against Sussex. In his eight first-class appearances, he scored 208 runs at an average of 14.85, with a high score of 55. This score, which was his only half century, came against Sussex.

He died on 9 September 1972 at Ipswich, Suffolk.
