= Oliver Norman =

English cricketer

Oliver Norman (born Ralph Oliver Geoffrey Norman; 30 July 1911 — 26 July 1983) was an English cricketer. He was a right-handed batsman and a left-arm medium-pace bowler who played first-class cricket for Essex. He was born in Southend-on-Sea and died in Thorpe Bay.

Norman made one first-class appearance for Essex during the 1932 season in a University Match against Cambridge University. Norman put on ten runs in both innings of the match from the upper-middle order, but was not selected to play for the team again.
