= Charles Pascoe =

English cricketer

Personal information
- Full name: Charles Henry Pascoe
- Born: 12 December 1876; Haggerston, London, England
- Died: 26 January 1957 (aged 80); Walthamstow, Essex, England
- Batting: Unknown
- Bowling: Slow left-arm orthodox

Domestic team information
- Years: Team
- 1909: Essex

Career statistics
Competition	First-class
Matches	1
Runs scored	3
Batting average	–
100s/50s	–/–
Top score	3*
Balls bowled	42
Wickets	–
Bowling average	–
5 wickets in innings	–
10 wickets in match	–
Best bowling	–
Catches/stumpings	–/–
- Source: Cricinfo, 22 April 2012

Charles Henry Pascoe (23 December 1876 – 26 January 1957) was an English cricketer. Pascoe's batting style is unknown, though it is known he was a slow left-arm orthodox bowler.

== Background ==
Pascoe was born at Haggerston, Middlesex. He died at Walthamstow, Essex, on 26 January 1957.

== Cricket career ==
Pascoe made a single first-class appearance for Essex against Leicestershire at Aylestone Road, Leicester, in the 1909 County Championship. Essex won the toss and elected to bat, making 213 in their first-innings, during which Pascoe ended not out on 3. Leicestershire responded in their first-innings by making 157 all out, during which Pascoe bowled two wicketless overs. In their second-innings, Essex made 100/6 declared, with Pascoe not being called upon to bat. Leicestershire reached 39/1 in their second-innings, before the match was declared a draw.

Pascoe's home club was Ilford Cricket Club.
