= William Gray (cricketer) =

English cricketer

William Gray (26 November 1864 — 18 December 1898) was an English cricketer who played first-class cricket for Essex. Gray was born and died in Chelmsford.

Gray made just one first-class appearance for the team, during the 1894 season, against Yorkshire. Playing as an opening batsman, he scored just four runs in two innings.

Gray died at the age of 34.
