= Cyril Searle =

English cricketer

Cyril Searle (12 May 1921 – February 2005) was an English cricketer. He was a wicket-keeper who played for Essex. He was born in Battersea and died in Wandsworth.

Searle made a single first-class appearance for the team, against Cambridge University in 1947. In the only innings in which he batted, he scored 5 not out. He took one catch and one stumping.
