= Thomas Foster (Yorkshire cricketer) =

English cricketer

Thomas William Foster (12 November 1871 – 31 January 1947) was an English first-class cricketer, who played thirteen matches for Yorkshire County Cricket Club in 1894 and 1895. He also played a first-class game for XI of Yorkshire against XI of Lancashire in 1894, and for the Yorkshire Second XI in 1893.

Born in Birkdale, Lancashire, England, Foster was a right arm medium pacer, he took 58 wickets at 16.41, including his career best of 9 for 59 against the Marylebone Cricket Club (MCC) at Lord's in 1894. He took 5 wickets in an innings five times, and 10 wickets in match on three occasions. Foster also took 7 for 56 against Warwickshire. A right-handed tail ender, he scored 138 runs at 9.20, with a top score of 25.

Foster died in January 1947 in Dewsbury, Yorkshire.
