= Colin Griffiths (cricketer) =

English cricketer

Personal information
- Born: 9 December 1930; Upminster, Essex, England
- Died: 14 September 2004 (aged 73); Princes Risborough, Buckinghamshire, England
- Batting: Right-handed
- Role: Batsman

Domestic team information
- Years: Team
- 1951–1953: Essex

Career statistics
Competition	First-class
Matches	27
Runs scored	615
Batting average	16.18
100s/50s	1/1
Top score	105
Balls bowled	18
Wickets	0
Bowling average	–
5 wickets in innings	0
10 wickets in match	0
Best bowling	–
Catches/stumpings	4/–
- Source: Cricinfo, 19 July 2013

Colin Griffiths (9 December 1930 – 14 September 2004) was an English cricketer. He played for Essex between 1951 and 1953.

Griffiths was educated at Brentwood School, Essex, and played cricket briefly as an amateur batsman before going into his family's demolition business. In 1952, going into the match with a first-class batting average of 12 and a highest score of 31, he hit the fastest first-class hundred of the season, 105 in 90 minutes for Essex against Kent, when he batted at No. 9 and added 183 for the eighth wicket in 90 minutes with Trevor Bailey. Essex won by an innings. Against Middlesex a few days later he scored 89, again at No. 9, and 25 retired hurt, his second innings ending when he pulled a back muscle while hitting a six.

Griffiths lost interest in cricket after leaving Essex. After some years in the family business, he pursued other interests and finished his working career as the head of a residential unit for disturbed adolescents.
