= Bob Richards (cricketer) =

English cricketer

Personal information
- Full name: Robert John Richards
- Born: 4 June 1934 (age 92); Winchester, Hampshire, England
- Batting: Right-handed
- Role: Wicket-keeper

Domestic team information
- Years: Team
- 1970: Essex

Career statistics
Competition	First-class
Matches	1
Runs scored	–
Batting average	–
100s/50s	–/–
Top score	–
Balls bowled	–
Wickets	–
Bowling average	–
5 wickets in innings	–
10 wickets in match	–
Best bowling	–
Catches/stumpings	0/0
- Source: Cricinfo, 25 October 2011

Robert John Richards (born 5 June 1934) is a former English cricketer. Richards was a right-handed batsman who fielded as a wicket-keeper. He was born at Winchester, Hampshire.

Richards made his only first-class appearance for Essex at the age of 36 against Jamaica during their tour of England in 1970. In a three-day match which was heavily curtailed due to rain, Richards wasn't called upon to bat, while keeping wicket he took no catches and made no stumpings. He wasn't called upon by Essex again following this match, though did continue to play the occasional Second XI match for the county.
