= Percy Campbell =

English cricketer

Personal information
- Full name: Percivale Campbell
- Born: 26 December 1887; West Ham, Essex, England
- Died: 18 March 1960 (aged 72); South Woodford, Essex, England
- Batting: Unknown
- Bowling: Unknown
- Role: Occasional wicket-keeper

Domestic team information
- Years: Team
- 1911–1919: Essex

Career statistics
Competition	First-class
Matches	13
Runs scored	270
Batting average	14.21
100s/50s	–/–
Top score	35
Balls bowled	18
Wickets	–
Bowling average	–
5 wickets in innings	–
10 wickets in match	–
Best bowling	–
Catches/stumpings	6/–
- Source: Cricinfo, 22 April 2012

Percivale Campbell (26 December 1887 – 18 March 1960) was an English cricketer. Campbell's batting and bowling styles are unknown, though it is known he occasionally fielded as a wicket-keeper. He was born at West Ham, Essex.

Campbell made his first-class debut for Essex against Nottinghamshire at Trent Bridge in the 1911 County Championship. He made twelve further first-class appearances for the county, the last of which came after World War I against Gloucestershire in the 1919 County Championship. In his thirteen first-class appearances, Campbell scored 270 runs at an average of 14.21, with a high score of 35.

He died at South Woodford, Essex, on 18 March 1960.
