= Ray Heaven =

English cricketer (1918–2004)

Personal information
- Full name: Raymond Maurice Heaven
- Born: 8 October 1918; Shoreham-by-Sea, Sussex, England
- Died: 4 February 2004 (aged 85); Bristol, England
- Height: 5 ft 8 in (1.73 m)
- Batting: Right-handed
- Bowling: Leg break
- Role: Wicket-keeper

Domestic team information
- Years: Team
- 1939: Essex

Career statistics
Competition	First-class
Matches	1
Runs scored	5
Batting average	–
100s/50s	0/0
Top score	5*
Catches/stumpings	4/–
- Source: Cricinfo, 24 October 2011

Raymond Maurice Heaven (8 October 1918 – 4 February 2004) was an English cricketer. Heaven was a right-handed batsman who bowled leg break and who could also field as a wicket-keeper. He was born at Shoreham-by-Sea, Sussex.

Heaven made his only first-class appearance for Essex against Yorkshire in the 1939 County Championship at Bramall Lane, Sheffield. In this match he ended Essex's innings unbeaten on 5. He did not keep wicket in this match, but did take 4 catches in the field.
