= Fred Spinks =

Bermudian cricketer

Personal information
- Full name: Edwin Frederick Spinks
- Born: 3 August 1902; Bermuda
- Died: 19 October 1982 (aged 80); Orsett, Essex, England

Domestic team information
- Years: Team
- 1926: Essex

Career statistics
Competition	First-class
Matches	2
Runs scored	2
Batting average	1.00
100s/50s	0/0
Top score	2
Balls bowled	120
Wickets	0
Bowling average	–
5 wickets in innings	–
10 wickets in match	–
Best bowling	–
Catches/stumpings	1/–
- Source: CricketArchive, 13 October 2011

Edwin Frederick Spinks (August 3, 1902 – October 19, 1982) was a Bermudian cricketer who played first-class cricket for Essex. Spinks was born in Bermuda and died in Orsett.

Spinks made two first-class appearances as a tailender for Essex during the 1926 season, but was unable to make much of a contribution to the team's batting, scoring just two runs in three innings.
