= Archie Gibson =

English cricketer

Personal information
- Full name: Archibald Lesley Gibson
- Born: 4 September 1877; Kingsclere, Hampshire, England
- Died: 29 July 1943 (aged 65); Nakuru, Kenya
- Batting: Right-handed
- Role: Batsman
- Relatives: Kenneth Gibson (cousin)

Domestic team information
- Years: Team
- 1895–1910: Essex

Career statistics
| Competition | FC |
|---|---|
| Matches | 25 |
| Runs scored | 504 |
| Batting average | 14.00 |
| 100s/50s | 0/1 |
| Top score | 71 |
| Balls bowled | 36 |
| Wickets | 0 |
| Bowling average | – |
| 5 wickets in innings | – |
| 10 wickets in match | – |
| Best bowling | – |
| Catches/stumpings | 9/0 |
- Source: Cricinfo, 27 July 2013

Archibald Lesley Gibson (4 September 1877 – 29 July 1943) was an English cricketer.

Beginning while he was still a schoolboy at Winchester College, Archie Gibson played a few matches for Essex from 1895 to 1897, and then most of the season in 1910. His only fifty came in Essex's victory over Kent in July 1910, when he made 71 batting at number three. He also played Minor Counties cricket for Dorset in 1905.

He spent most of his working life as a tea planter in Ceylon, where he was the superintendent of Diyagama Estate, Agrapatana. He captained Ceylon at cricket and served as president of the Ceylon Cricket Association. He played his last first-class match against the touring MCC in February 1927. He was highly regarded by the Ceylonese for his rapport with and care for the local people, and a cricket match, Sinhalese Sports Club versus A. L. Gibson's XI, was played in his honour in 1931 just before his departure from Ceylon.
