= Geoffrey Farnfield =

English cricketer

Personal information
- Full name: Geoffrey George Farnfield
- Born: 13 July 1897; West Ham, Essex, England
- Died: 22 March 1974 (aged 76); Leamington Spa, Warwickshire, England
- Batting: Right-handed

Domestic team information
- Years: Team
- 1921: Essex

Career statistics
Competition	FC
Matches	12
Runs scored	252
Batting average	13.26
100s/50s	–/–
Top score	41
Balls bowled	–
Wickets	–
Bowling average	–
5 wickets in innings	–
10 wickets in match	–
Best bowling	–
Catches/stumpings	5/–
- Source: Cricinfo, 29 December 2010

Geoffrey George Farnfield (13 July 1897 – 22 March 1974) was an English cricketer. Farnfield was a right-handed batsman. He was born at West Ham, Essex.

Farnfield played 12 first-class matches for Essex in the 1921 County Championship, making his debut against Surrey, with his final game coming against Kent. In his 12 first-class matches, he scored 252 runs at a batting average of 13.26, with a high score of 41.

He died at Leamington Spa, Warwickshire on 22 March 1974.
