= Robert Hyndson =

South African-born English cricketer

Robert Hyndson (1894 – 9 October 1943) was a Cape Colony-born English cricketer who played for Essex. He was born in Cape Town and died in Bradford.

Hyndson made a single first-class appearance for the team, in 1919 against the Australian Imperial Forces. His brother, James, made thirteen first-class appearances, for Marylebone Cricket Club and Surrey.
