= Fred Scoulding =

English cricketer

Personal information
- Full name: Frederick John Scoulding
- Born: 26 August 1887; Bow, London, England
- Died: 25 August 1928 (aged 40); Whitechapel, London, England
- Batting: Left-handed
- Role: Bowler

Domestic team information
- Years: Team
- 1912–1920: Essex

Career statistics
Competition	FC
Matches	22
Runs scored	92
Batting average	5.41
100s/50s	0/0
Top score	21
Balls bowled	2465
Wickets	32
Bowling average	39.12
5 wickets in innings	0
10 wickets in match	0
Best bowling	4/50
Catches/stumpings	6/0
- Source: Cricinfo, 22 July 2013

Fred Scoulding (26 August 1887 – 25 August 1928) was an English cricketer. He played for Essex between 1912 and 1920.
