= Gerald Ridley =

English cricketer

Personal information
- Full name: Gerald Vernon Newport Ridley
- Born: 23 October 1897; Felsted, Essex, England
- Died: 12 November 1953 (aged 56); Chignal St James, Essex, England
- Batting: Right-handed
- Bowling: Right-arm medium

Domestic team information
- Years: Team
- 1922–1926: Essex

Career statistics
Competition	First-class
Matches	6
Runs scored	113
Batting average	10.27
100s/50s	–/1
Top score	54
Balls bowled	–
Wickets	–
Bowling average	–
5 wickets in innings	–
10 wickets in match	–
Best bowling	–
Catches/stumpings	3/–
- Source: Cricinfo, 31 October 2011

Gerald Vernon Newport Ridley TD, JP (23 October 1897 – 12 November 1953) was an English cricketer. Ridley was a right-handed batsman who bowled right-arm medium pace. He was born at Felsted, Essex.

Ridley served during World War I, during which he was promoted from 2nd Lieutenant to Lieutenant on 28 May 1918. He later resigned his commission from the 2nd Dragoon Guards on 1 April 1920, retaining the rank of Lieutenant. Later in November of that year, he joined the Essex Yeomanry, which was part of the Territorial Force.

In cricket, Ridley made his first-class debut for Essex against the Combined Services in 1922. He made five further first-class appearances for Essex, the last of which came against Somerset in the 1926 County Championship. In his six first-class appearances, he scored 113 runs at an average of 10.27, with a high score of 66 not out54. This score, which was his only first-class half century, came against Gloucestershire in 1924.

In September 1930 he was awarded the Efficiency Decoration for over twelve years service in the Essex Yeomanry (his service had earlier been placed back to 28 May 1918). By 1938 he held the rank of Captain and had been awarded the Territorial Decoration, it was in this year that he resigned his commission. Outside of his cricket and military service he worked as a Justice of the peace. He was also a member of the executive committee at Essex County Cricket Club until his death at Chignal St James, Essex on 12 November 1953.
