= Ronald Clark (cricketer) =

English cricketer

Ronald Disston Clark (22 February 1895 – 20 February 1983) was an English cricketer active from 1912 to 1919 who played for Essex. He was born in Romford and died in East Wittering. He appeared in seven first-class matches as a righthanded batsman and wicketkeeper. He scored 61 runs with a highest score of 14 and completed ten catches with one stumping.
