= Henry Whitcombe =

English cricketer

Personal information
- Full name: Henry Maurice Whitcombe
- Born: 15 August 1900; Hardwick, Buckinghamshire, England
- Died: 2 April 1984 (aged 83); Ware, Hertfordshire, England
- Batting: Right-handed
- Role: Bowler

Domestic team information
- Years: Team
- 1922: Essex

Career statistics
Competition	FC
Matches	3
Runs scored	13
Batting average
100s/50s
Top score
Balls bowled
Wickets	1
Bowling average
5 wickets in innings
10 wickets in match
Best bowling
Catches/stumpings
- Source: Cricinfo, 21 July 2013

Henry Whitcombe (15 August 1900 – 2 April 1984) was an English army officer in the Royal Engineers, cricketer and railway artist. He played three matches for Essex in 1922.
