= Stan Quin =

South African cricketer (1872–1939)

Stanley Edgar Vivian Quin (30 April 1872 – 27 March 1939) was a South African cricketer active from 1924 to 1932 who played for Essex and the Orange Free State cricket team. He was born and died in Bishops Glen, Orange Free State, South Africa. He appeared in three first-class matches as a righthanded batsman who bowled off braks. He scored three runs and took no wickets.
