= George Hockey =

English cricketer

Personal information
- Full name: George William Hockey
- Born: 1 January 1905; Ipswich, Suffolk, England
- Died: 1990 (aged 84–85); Bulawayo, Zimbabwe
- Batting: Right-handed
- Role: Batsman

Domestic team information
- Years: Team
- 1928–1931: Essex

Career statistics
Competition	FC
Matches	19
Runs scored	305
Batting average	10.89
100s/50s	0/0
Top score	23
Balls bowled	30
Wickets	0
Bowling average
5 wickets in innings
10 wickets in match
Best bowling
Catches/stumpings	4/0
- Source: Cricinfo, 20 July 2013

George Hockey (1 January 1905 – 27 March 1990) was an English cricketer. He played for Essex between 1928 and 1931.
