= Francis Rowe (Cambridge cricketer) =

English cricketer

Francis Coryndon Carpenter Rowe (29 July 1859 – 5 April 1897) was a cricketer for Cambridge University between 1880 and 1881. A wicket-keeper and left-hand bat, Rowe was born in Ceylon and educated at Harrow School and Trinity College, Cambridge. He played only six matches, with 155 runs at 15.50 and three catches. He died at sea aboard the Pacific Steam Navigation Company liner RMS Oruba while returning from Australia to England aged 37.
