= Henry Riding =

English cricketer

Henry Riding (19 September 1899 — 21 May 1923) was an English cricketer. He played first-class cricket for Essex in 1921. Riding was born in Epping and died at the age of 23 in Chingford.

Riding's sole first-class match came in a drawn match against Lancashire, in which he scored 23 runs in the two innings in which he played.

Riding was an upper order batsman.
