= Tony Steward (cricketer) =

South African cricketer (1941–2002)

Tony Steward (Exley Anthony Whitefoord Steward; 27 June 1941 – 4 May 2002) was a South African cricketer. He was a right-handed batsman and a leg-break bowler, and occasional wicket-keeper. He was born and died in Durban.

Steward began playing Second XI cricket for Essex during the 1962 season, scoring a duck on his debut for the team, before making fourteen further appearances for the team before the end of the year. While he spent the following year still as a part of the Second XI, it was his consistent performances this season which brought him up to the first-team squad, for whom he made his debut first-class appearance in 1964, playing a single University Match prior to his first appearance in the County Championship a month later.

Steward batted well from the Essex lower order, frequently scoring in double-figures with tenacious partnership-building from more experienced members of the team, and making nine County Championship appearances before the season came to a close.

Steward's second and final season of first-class cricket in England came the following year, but Essex underperformed, finishing third-bottom in the 1965 County Championship table. Steward found himself out of the team and moving back to South Africa at the end of the season.

Steward made a return to cricket during the 1967–68 season, playing three games for Natal B in the Currie Cup. Nearly a decade later, he made two further appearances for South African Country Districts in miscellaneous matches.
