= Ernest Stanley =

English cricketer

Personal information
- Full name: Ernest Arthur William Stanley
- Born: 27 September 1926; Leyton, Essex, England
- Died: August 2006 (aged 79); Harlow, Essex, England
- Batting: Right-handed
- Role: Batsman

Domestic team information
- Years: Team
- 1950–1952: Essex

Career statistics
Competition	FC
Matches	13
Runs scored	226
Batting average
100s/50s
Top score
Balls bowled
Wickets
Bowling average
5 wickets in innings
10 wickets in match
Best bowling
Catches/stumpings
- Source: Cricinfo, 19 July 2013

Ernest Stanley (27 September 1926 – August 2006) was an English cricketer. He played for Essex between 1949 and 1952.
