= Anthony Stanyard =

English cricketer

Personal information
- Full name: Anthony Roy Stanyard
- Born: 5 April 1938 (age 86); Plaistow, Newham, England
- Batting: Right-handed
- Bowling: Right-arm medium

Domestic team information
- Years: Team
- 1960: Essex County Cricket Club

Anthony Roy Stanyard (born 5 April 1938) is an English cricketer. He was a right-handed batsman and a right-arm medium-pace bowler who played first-class cricket for Essex in the 1960 season. He was born in Plaistow.

Stanyard made two first-class appearances for Essex, having made his Minor Counties Championship debut at the age of 16 in 1954 - continuing to play in the competition until 1960. His two first-class appearances came within a week-long stretch in May 1960, his second match coming against South African tourists, halfway through a Test series against England.
