= Peter Lindsey =

English cricketer (born 1944)

Peter Lindsey (born 29 May 1944) was an English cricketer. He was a right-handed batsman and a right-arm off-break bowler. He was born in Matlock, Derbyshire.

Lindsey began representing Essex Second XI in 1959, making his debut against Sussex at the age of just 15. Lindsey was a frequent starter in the Second XI for the next five years, but he made just a single first-class appearance, for Essex against Oxford University in 1964, when Lindsey was still only 19 years old.

Lindsey took one wicket for Essex during this match, recording second-inning figures of a mere eight runs from six overs. Lindsey continued to play for the Essex Second XI until the end of the 1965 season, when he left the team, still aged only 21.
