= Reuben Herbert =

South African-born English cricketer

Personal information
- Full name: Reuben Herbert
- Born: 1 December 1957 (age 68); Cape Town, Cape Province, South Africa
- Batting: Right-handed
- Bowling: Right-arm off break

Domestic team information
- Years: Team
- 1987: Hertfordshire
- 1986–1987: Minor Counties
- 1984–1986: Suffolk
- 1976–1981: Essex

Career statistics
| Competition | First-class | List A |
|---|---|---|
| Matches | 8 | 16 |
| Runs scored | 138 | 182 |
| Batting average | 12.54 | 14.00 |
| 100s/50s | –/– | –/– |
| Top score | 43 | 37 |
| Balls bowled | 484 | 788 |
| Wickets | 6 | 13 |
| Bowling average | 43.66 | 42.07 |
| 5 wickets in innings | – | – |
| 10 wickets in match | – | – |
| Best bowling | 3/64 | 3/26 |
| Catches/stumpings | 6/– | 5/– |
- Source: Cricinfo, 27 July 2011

Reuben Herbert (born 1 December 1957) is a South African born former English cricketer. Herbert was a right-handed batsman who bowled right-arm off break. He was born in Cape Town, Cape Province.

Herbert made his first-class debut for Essex against Warwickshire in 1976 County Championship. He made 5 further first-class appearances for Essex, the last of which came against Lancashire in 1980 County Championship. In his 6 first-class appearance for Essex, he scored 62 runs at an average of 7.75, with a high score of 14 not out. With the ball, he took 3 wickets at a bowling average of 49.33, with best figures of 3/64. He made his List A debut for Essex in the 1980 John Player League against Yorkshire. He made 3 further List A appearances for the county, the last of which came against the touring Sri Lankans in 1981. He took 5 wickets in his 4 List A matches for Essex, which came at an average of 30.00, with best figures of 3/31. He left Essex at the end of the 1981 season.

He joined Suffolk in 1984, making his debut for the county in that seasons Minor Counties Championship against Cambridgeshire. He played Minor counties cricket for Suffolk from 1984 to 1986, making 22 Minor Counties Championship and 3 MCCA Knockout Trophy appearances. He made his first List A appearance for Suffolk against Worcestershire in the 1984 NatWest Trophy. He made 2 further List A appearances for the county, against Lancashire in the 1985 NatWest Trophy and Sussex in the 1986 NatWest Trophy. In his 3 List A matches for Suffolk, he took just a single wickets at an average of 82.00, with best figures of 1/37. He played for the Minor Counties cricket team in the 1986 Benson & Hedges Cup, making 4 appearances for the team. It was for the Minor Counties that he made his final 2 first-class appearances for. The first of these came against the touring Zimbabweans in 1985. He bowled 8 wicket-less overs in the Zimbabweans first-innings, while in the Minor Counties first-innings he scored 43 runs before being dismissed by Eddo Brandes. He followed this up in the Zimbabweans second-innings by taking 3 wickets for the cost of 76 runs from 28 overs. His final first-class match came the following year against the touring New Zealanders. He was dismissed by Willie Watson in the Minor Counties first-innings for 10 runs, while in the New Zealanders first-innings he bowled 8 wicket-less overs. In a rain affected match, he didn't bat or bowl again the game.

He left Suffolk at the end of the 1986 season, but joined Hertfordshire the following season. He made his Minor Counties Championship debut for Hertfordshire against Lincolnshire. Herbert played 8 further Minor Counties Championship matches that season, the last of which came against Cumberland. He made a single List A appearance for Hertfordshire in the 1987 NatWest Trophy against Surrey. Opening the batting in this match, he scored 37 runs before being dismissed by Sylvester Clarke. With the ball, he took the wicket of Grahame Clinton for the cost of 36 runs from 11 overs. He once again played for the Minor Counties in 1987, appearing in 4 matches in that seasons Benson & Hedges Cup. Herbert made a total of 8 List A appearances for the Minor Counties, scoring 106 runs at an average of 15.14, with a high score of 26 not out. With the ball, he took 6 wickets at an average of 46.50, with best figures of 3/26. He also played club cricket for Orsett and Westcliff Cricket club in the Essex Premier League, where he captained before retiring in 1988 to have a business career in South Yorkshire.
