= Hugh Wagstaff =

English cricketer

Personal information
- Born: 15 October 1895; Romford, Essex, England
- Died: 2 March 1970 (aged 74); Hornchurch, London, England
- Batting: Right-handed
- Role: Bowler

Domestic team information
- Years: Team
- 1920–1921: Essex

Career statistics
Competition	FC
Matches	5
Runs scored	19
Batting average
100s/50s
Top score
Balls bowled
Wickets	2
Bowling average
5 wickets in innings
10 wickets in match
Best bowling
Catches/stumpings
- Source: Cricinfo, 21 July 2013

Hugh Wagstaff (15 October 1895 – 2 March 1970) was an English cricketer. He played for Essex between 1920 and 1921.
