= Cecil Gosling =

English cricketer

Personal information
- Full name: Cecil Henry Gosling
- Born: 22 February 1910; Essex, England
- Died: 19 May 1974 (aged 64); Essex, England
- Batting: Right-handed
- Role: Batsman

Domestic team information
- Years: Team
- 1930: Essex
- 1929–1930: Oxford University

Career statistics
Competition	First-class
Matches	5
Runs scored	132
Batting average	16.50
100s/50s	0/0
Top score	37
Catches/stumpings	3/–
- Source: Cricinfo, 20 July 2013

Major Cecil Gosling MC TD (22 February 1910 – 19 May 1974) was an English cricketer. The nephew of R. Cunliffe Gosling, he attended Eton and Magdalen College, Oxford. He made five first-class appearances in 1929 and 1930, three for Oxford University and two for Essex.

During the Second World War, Gosling served in the Essex Yeomanry and was awarded a Military Cross in 1945. In 1949 he became a Deputy Lieutenant of Essex and later served as Justice of the Peace in the county. His death was as a result of suicide by firearm having suffered with a severe illness.
