= Arthur Lapham =

English cricketer

Arthur Lapham (1879 — 9 February 1964) was an English cricketer who played first-class cricket for Essex during the 1921 season.

Lapham made three first-class appearances for the team during the season, having begun his cricketing career as many as fifteen years previously, making the first of his five Minor Counties Championship appearances for Wiltshire in 1906. Lapham played two further miscellaneous matches, both against Marylebone Cricket Club at Lord's.

Forty-two years old by the time he finally got his chance at first-class action, Lapham made his debut playing against Derbyshire, in a game in which JWHT Douglas took nine wickets in the Derbyshire first-innings, and made 210* with the bat.

Lapham made two further first-class appearances, but was out of the team by the end of the same week in which he made his debut.
