= Philip Morris (English cricketer) =

English cricketer

Philip Edward Morris (26 November 1877 – 6 July 1945) was an English cricketer active from 1909 to 1924 who played for Essex. He was born in Kennington and died in Hove. He appeared in 28 first-class matches as a righthanded batsman who bowled leg breaks. He scored 418 runs with a highest score of 55* and took 83 wickets with a best performance of eight for 106.
