= Don Spencer (cricketer) =

English cricketer

Personal information
- Full name: Walter Gordon Spencer
- Born: 2 August 1912; Chingford, Essex, England
- Died: 20 July 1971 (aged 58); Chelmsford, Essex, England
- Batting: Right-handed
- Bowling: Slow left-arm orthodox

Domestic team information
- Years: Team
- 1938–1948: Essex

Career statistics
Competition	First-class
Matches	3
Runs scored	52
Batting average	13.00
100s/50s	–/–
Top score	25
Balls bowled	18
Wickets	1
Bowling average	8.00
5 wickets in innings	–
10 wickets in match	–
Best bowling	1/8
Catches/stumpings	–/–
- Source: Cricinfo, 26 October 2011

Walter Gordon "Don" Spencer (2 August 1912 – 20 July 1971) was an English cricketer. Spencer was a right-handed batsman who bowled slow left-arm orthodox. He was born at Chingford, Essex.

Spencer made his first-class debut for Essex against Somerset in the 1938 County Championship. He made a further first-class appearance that season against Middlesex. He scored a total of 27 runs in these two matches at an average of 9.00, with a high score of 10. Following World War II, Spencer returned to Essex to play a single first-class match in 1948 against Middlesex. In this match, he scored 25 runs in Essex's first-innings before being dismissed by Denis Compton. He took his only first-class wicket in Middlesex's second-innings when he dismissed Sydney Brown.

He died on 20 July 1971 at Chelmsford, Essex.
