= Albert Lashbrooke =

English cricketer (1883–1963)

Albert Edward Lashbrooke (30 November 1883 – 2 October 1963) was an English cricketer. He was a medium-fast bowler who played first-class cricket for Essex. He was born in West Ham and died in West Hulme.

Lashbrooke made one first-class appearance for Essex during the 1908 season, against Lancashire making nine runs and taking 1–26 with the ball from seventeen overs of bowling.
