= William Mayes (cricketer) =

English cricketer

William Mayes (17 July 1885 – 5 February 1946) was an English cricketer. He was a right-handed batsman and a right-arm fast bowler who played first-class cricket for Essex. He was born in Marylebone and died in Esher.

Mayes made his only first-class appearance during the 1914 season, in a County Championship match against Middlesex. Mayes' sole first-class contribution was two runs, prior to being run out, in an innings defeat.

Six years later, Mayes made two Minor Counties Championship appearances for Essex's Second XI.
