= Benjamin Strutton =

English cricketer

Personal information
- Full name: Benjamin Thomas Strutton
- Born: 1892; Stifford, Essex, England
- Died: 9 February 1968 (aged 75–76); Southwark, London, England
- Batting: Unknown
- Bowling: Slow left-arm orthodox

Domestic team information
- Years: Team
- 1914–1919: Essex

Career statistics
Competition	First-class
Matches	4
Runs scored	64
Batting average	12.80
100s/50s	–/–
Top score	19
Balls bowled	294
Wickets	–
Bowling average	–
5 wickets in innings	–
10 wickets in match	–
Best bowling	–
Catches/stumpings	1/–
- Source: Cricinfo, 8 April 2012

Benjamin Thomas Strutton (1892 – 9 February 1968) was an English cricketer. Strutton's batting style is unknown, though it is known he bowled slow left-arm orthodox. He was born at Stifford, Essex.

Strutton made his first-class debut for Essex against Middlesex at the County Ground, Leyton, in the 1914 County Championship. He made three further first-class appearances for Essex following World War I. These came in the 1919 County Championship against Yorkshire, Somerset and Hampshire. In his four first-class matches, he scored a total of 64 runs at an average of 12.80, with a high score of 19. With the ball, he bowled a total of 49 overs, but despite bowling such a large number of overs he went wicketless.

He died at Southwark, London, on 9 February 1968.
