= Tanveer Sikandar =

Pakistani cricketer (born 1987)

Tanveer Sikandar (born 6 February 1987, in Islamabad) is a Pakistani cricketer active since 2013 who has played for Sui Northern Gas Pipelines Limited and Essex in first-class matches as a righthanded batsman who bowls right arm medium pace.
