= Richard Baker (cricketer) =

English cricketer (born 1952)

Richard Kenneth Baker (born 28 April 1952 in Essex) is an English former cricketer who played for Essex in 1972 and for Cambridge University in 1973 and 1974. He appeared in 20 first-class matches as a right-handed batsman who kept wicket. He scored 505 runs with a highest score of 59* and completed 25 catches with one stumping.
