= Malcolm Mackinnon =

English cricketer

Personal information
- Born: 11 May 1891; Argyll, Scotland
- Died: 13 February 1975 (aged 83); Sunningdale, Berkshire, England
- Batting: Right-handed
- Role: Batsman

Domestic team information
- Years: Team
- 1927–1935: Essex

Career statistics
Competition	FC
Matches	6
Runs scored	122
Batting average	12.20
100s/50s	0/0
Top score	31
Balls bowled
Wickets
Bowling average
5 wickets in innings
10 wickets in match
Best bowling
Catches/stumpings	3/0
- Source: ESPNcricinfo, 21 July 2013

Malcolm Mackinnon (11 May 1891 – 13 February 1975) was an English cricketer. He played for Essex between 1927 and 1935.
