= Henry Preece =

English cricketer

Personal information
- Full name: Henry Charles Preece
- Born: 27 October 1867; Weobley, Herefordshire, England
- Died: 17 September 1937 (aged 69); Highgate, Middlesex, England
- Batting: Right-handed
- Role: Batsman

Domestic team information
- Years: Team
- 1895: Essex
- FC debut: 20 May 1895 Essex v Somerset
- Last FC: 24 June 1895 Essex v Yorkshire

Career statistics
Competition	First-class
Matches	2
Runs scored	74
Batting average	18.50
100s/50s	0/0
Top score	49
Catches/stumpings	0/–
- Source: CricketArchive, 14 June 2025

Henry Charles Preece (27 October 1867 – 17 September 1937) was an English cricketer. He was a right-handed batsman who played first-class cricket for Essex. He was born in Weobley, Herefordshire and died in Highgate.

Preece made two first-class appearances for Essex during the 1895 County Championship, having made his first cricketing appearances for Cheshire in 1893. Despite having a rather good first-class debut, in which he scored 19 in the first innings and 49 in the second, his second and final appearance was less fortunate, as his only batting contribution was six runs in the second innings.

Preece made no further first-class appearances beyond this.
