= Geoff Nolan =

English cricketer

Geoffrey John Nolan (6 October 1937 – 30 June 2010) was an English cricketer. He was a right-handed batsman who played first-class cricket for Essex. He was born in Colchester.

Having represented the Second XI since he was 19 years old, in both the Second XI Championship and the Minor Counties Championship, Nolan made a single first-class appearance for the team, during the 1968 season, after a five-year lay-off.

Nolan was a lower-middle-order batsman.
