= Harold Arkwright =

English cricketer

Personal information
- Full name: Harold Arthur Arkwright
- Born: 10 November 1872; Oswestry, Shropshire, England
- Died: 10 December 1942 (aged 70); Virginia Water, Surrey, England
- Batting: Right-handed
- Bowling: Right-arm medium

Domestic team information
- Years: Team
- 1893–1895: Oxford University
- 1894–1895: Essex
- 1898: Cambridgeshire
- First-class debut: 29 May 1893 Oxford University v Somerset
- Last First-class: 4 June 1903 Marylebone Cricket Club v Oxford University

Career statistics
Competition	First-class
Matches	24
Runs scored	453
Batting average	11.92
100s/50s	0/0
Top score	38
Balls bowled	3,212
Wickets	72
Bowling average	23.62
5 wickets in innings	5
10 wickets in match	1
Best bowling	8/40
Catches/stumpings	16/–
- Source: CricketArchive, 20 November 2012

Harold Arthur Arkwright (10 November 1872 – 10 December 1942) was an English cricketer who played first-class cricket for Oxford University between 1893 and 1895. He also made a few appearances for Essex during his university years, and later played two minor counties matches for Cambridgeshire.

Educated firstly at Eton College, he was in the school's first eleven in both 1890 and 1891. He went up to Magdalen College, Oxford, and was awarded his Blue in 1895, when he took 0 for 16 and 1 for 71 in two innings. He toured North American with Frank Mitchell's side in 1895, and played some cricket for Essex, Cambridgeshire and the Free Foresters. His final first-class appearance was in 1903, playing for the Marylebone Cricket Club against Oxford University. In all, he claimed 72 wickets in 24 first-class appearances at an average of 23.62, and took ten wickets in a match on one occasion: against Yorkshire in 1895.

== Bibliography ==
- Bolton, Geoffrey (1962). History of the O.U.C.C. (1st ed.). Oxford: Holywell Press.
