= Robert Pook =

English cricketer

Neil Robert Pook (born 9 February 1967) is a former English cricketer. He was born in Rainham, Greater London. He was a right-handed batsman and a right-arm medium-pace bowler. Pook's first-class career spanned two games for two teams, making his debut in 1988 for Essex and his second appearance, two years later, for Glamorgan, playing against Cambridge and Oxford University respectively.

Pook was on the Essex side which was defeated in the final of the 1986 Bain Dawes Trophy. His Second XI debut came at the age of just eighteen for Essex against Surrey following three seasons with the M.C.C. Young Cricketers where he was proud to field as 12th man during an England vs India Test match. Pook remained in the Essex Second XI team until 1989 and spent a year with Glamorgan.
