= George Locks =

English cricketer

George Melbourne Locks (24 May 1889 – 17 September 1965) was an English cricketer who played for Essex. He was born in Leytonstone and died in Redbridge.

Locks made two first-class appearances for Essex during the 1928 season, the first, a heavy defeat by Lancashire in which, in the only innings in which Locks played, he finished not out at the bottom of the order. Locks' second and final first-class match saw his team suffer an innings defeat at the hands of Yorkshire, in which Locks failed to put a run on the board.

Locks was a tailend batsman who picked up three wickets with the ball during his two games.
