= George Ayres (cricketer) =

English cricketer

George White Ayres
- Born: 5 July 1871
- Died: 28 August 1934 (aged 63)
- Occupation: English cricketer

George White Ayres (5 July 1871 – 28 August 1934) was an English cricketer who played between 1892 and 1899 as a right-handed batsman for Surrey and then briefly Essex. Born in Giggs Hill, Thames Ditton in Surrey, he was picked for Surrey's Second XI in 1889 before graduating to the first team by 1890, taking his first-class cap on 2 June 1892 against Somerset. He made twenty-five appearances for Surrey, scoring 407 runs at 12.71 though never once passed fifty. He moved to Essex for the 1899 season and made 12 appearances for them scoring 262 runs at 16.43 including his career best knock of 83. He retired from playing that year and became an umpire for Oxford University matches, standing in eighteen games. He died at Riverside Park, Felpham in Sussex.
