= Maurice Berkley =

English cricketer

Personal information
- Full name: Maurice Berkley
- Born: 6 September 1872; Navestock, Essex, England
- Died: 9 August 1947 (aged 74); Bangor, Caernarvonshire, Wales
- Batting: Right-handed
- Bowling: Right-arm slow

Domestic team information
- Years: Team
- 1894: Essex

Career statistics
Competition	First-class
Matches	2
Runs scored	6
Batting average	3.00
100s/50s	–/–
Top score	5
Balls bowled	138
Wickets	7
Bowling average	14.71
5 wickets in innings	1
10 wickets in match	–
Best bowling	6/50
Catches/stumpings	2/–
- Source: Cricinfo, 28 February 2011

Maurice Berkley (6 September 1872 – 9 August 1947) was an English cricketer. Berkley was a right-handed batsman who bowled right-arm slow. He was born in Navestock, Essex and educated at Fettes College in Edinburgh, where he played for the college cricket team.

Berkley played for Essex twice in the 1894 County Championship against Yorkshire and Leicestershire. In his two matches, he scored 6 runs at a batting average of 3.00, with a high score of 5. More successful in the bowling department, Berkley took 7 wickets at a bowling average of 14.71. six of his wickets came in a single innings in his maiden first-class match against Yorkshire, claiming 6/50.

He died in Bangor, Caernarvonshire on 9 August 1947.
