= Allan Hayzelden =

English cricketer

Allan Hayzelden (10 January 1904 — 10 April 1955) was an English cricketer. He was a right-handed batsman and a right-arm fast bowler who played first-class cricket for Essex. He was born in Leytonstone and died in Harefield.

Hayzelden's cricketing debut came during the 1929 season against Worcestershire. His second and final first-class appearance came two years later, in which, he took three wickets.
