= Kenneth Gibson (cricketer) =

English cricketer

Personal information
- Full name: Kenneth Lloyd Gibson
- Born: 11 May 1888; Kensington, London, England
- Died: 14 May 1967 (aged 79); Marylebone, London, England
- Batting: Right-handed
- Role: Wicket-keeper
- Relatives: Archie Gibson (cousin)

Domestic team information
- Years: Team
- 1909 to 1912: Essex

Career statistics
Competition	First-class
Matches	42
Runs scored	959
Batting average	16.82
100s/50s	0/4
Top score	75
Balls bowled	11
Wickets	1
Bowling average	9.00
5 wickets in innings	–
10 wickets in match	–
Best bowling	1/9
Catches/stumpings	62/11
- Source: Cricinfo, 27 December 2017

Sir Kenneth Lloyd Gibson, 2nd Baronet (11 May 1888 – 14 May 1967) was an English cricketer who played for Essex from 1909 to 1912.

Gibson was born in Kensington, London, and educated at Eton College. He appeared in 42 first-class matches as a right-handed batsman and wicketkeeper. He scored 959 runs and took 62 catches and 11 stumpings. His fullest season was 1911, when in 20 matches he scored 533 runs at an average of 19.74 and took 35 catches and 6 stumpings. He made his highest score of 75 that season against Surrey.

He was the second Gibson baronet of Great Warley, a title he inherited on the death of his father, Sir Herbert Gibson, the first baronet (1851–1932). He married Mary Edith Elwes in February 1914; they had two daughters. While serving with the Dragoon Guards in World War I he was mentioned in dispatches. He was Clerk of the Course at Sandown Park Racecourse in the 1950s.

Baronetage of the United Kingdom
Preceded by Herbert Gibson	Baronet (of Great Warley); 1932–1967	Succeeded by Ackroyd Herbert Gibson (younger brother)
