= Ron Evans (cricketer) =

English cricketer

Personal information
- Full name: Ronald Ernest Evans
- Born: 22 July 1922; East Ham, Essex, England
- Died: 16 June 1992 (aged 69); Upminster, Essex, England
- Batting: Right-handed

Domestic team information
- Years: Team
- 1950–1957: Essex

Career statistics
Competition	First-class
Matches	17
Runs scored	482
Batting average	16.62
100s/50s	–/3
Top score	79
Balls bowled	–
Wickets	–
Bowling average	–
5 wickets in innings	–
10 wickets in match	–
Best bowling	–
Catches/stumpings	8/–
- Source: Cricinfo, 24 October 2011

Ronald Ernest Evans (22 July 1922 – 16 June 1993) was an English cricketer. Evans was a right-handed batsman. He was born at East Ham, Essex.

Evans made his first-class debut for Essex against Kent in the 1950 County Championship. He made sixteen further first-class appearances for the county, the last of which came against Hampshire in the 1957 County Championship. Nine of his first-class appearances came in 1950, one in 1953, five in 1954 and one each in 1955 and 1957. In his seventeen first-class appearances, he scored 482 runs at an average of 16.62, with a high score of 79. This score, which was one of three fifties he made, came against Kent on debut at Mote Park, Maidstone.

He died at Upminster, Essex on 16 June 1993.
