= Walter Cooper (Essex cricketer) =

English cricketer

- Occupation: cricketer.

Walter Cooper (dates unknown) was an English cricketer. A left-hand bat and slow left-arm orthodox bowler, he played three matches for Essex sporadically between 1905 and 1910. He failed to take a wicket and made only 32 runs in his career.
