= Joseph Milner (cricketer) =

English cricketer

Personal information
- Born: 22 August 1937; Johannesburg, South Africa
- Died: 1993 (aged 55–56); South Africa
- Batting: Right-handed
- Role: Batsman

Domestic team information
- Years: Team
- 1957–1961: Essex

Career statistics
Competition	FC
Matches	67
Runs scored	2767
Batting average	25.85
100s/50s	3/13
Top score	135
Balls bowled	12
Wickets	0
Bowling average	7.00
5 wickets in innings	0
10 wickets in match	0
Best bowling
Catches/stumpings	57/0
- Source: Cricinfo, 19 July 2013

Joseph Milner (22 August 1937 – 1993) was an English cricketer. He played for Essex between 1957 and 1961.
