= Gordon Melluish =

English cricketer

Personal information
- Full name: Gordon Christopher Melluish
- Born: 25 August 1906; Marylebone, London, England
- Died: 14 April 1977 (aged 70); Little Bushey, Hertfordshire, England
- Batting: Right-handed
- Role: Bowler

Domestic team information
- Years: Team
- 1926: Essex

Career statistics
Competition	FC
Matches	4
Runs scored	18
Batting average
100s/50s
Top score
Balls bowled
Wickets	3
Bowling average
5 wickets in innings
10 wickets in match
Best bowling
Catches/stumpings
- Source: Cricinfo, 21 July 2013

Gordon Melluish (25 August 1906 – 14 April 1977) was an English cricketer. He played four matches for Essex in 1926.
