= Francis Rowe (Essex cricketer) =

English cricketer

Francis Erskine Rowe (30 November 1864 – 17 May 1928) was a cricketer for Essex County Cricket Club between 1890 and 1895. A right-hand bat and wicket keeper, Rowe made four sporadic appearances for the club. Born in Hartford End, Essex, he left the club and moved to Sussex, living in Littlehampton at the time of his death.
