= John Bawtree =

English cricketer (1873–1938)

Personal information
- Full name: John Francis Bawtree
- Born: 26 November 1873; Witham, Essex, England
- Died: 25 March 1938 (aged 64); Great Totham, Essex, England
- Batting: Unknown
- Bowling: Slow left-arm orthodox

Domestic team information
- Years: Team
- 1895–1896: Essex

Career statistics
Competition	First-class
Matches	5
Runs scored	96
Batting average	12.00
100s/50s	–/–
Top score	47
Balls bowled	105
Wickets	2
Bowling average	33.00
5 wickets in innings	–
10 wickets in match	–
Best bowling	1/16
Catches/stumpings	5/–
- Source: Cricinfo, 27 October 2011

Captain John Francis Bawtree (26 November 1873 – 25 March 1938) was an English cricketer. Bawtree's batting style is not known, but it is known he bowled slow left-arm orthodox. He was born at Witham, Essex.

Bawtree made his first-class debut for Essex against Somerset in the 1895 County Championship. He made four further first-class appearances for Essex, the last of which came against the touring Australians in 1896. In these matches, he scored 96 runs at an average of 12.00, with a high score of 47. With the ball, he took 2 wickets at a bowling average of 33.00, with best figures of 1/16.

Bawtree later served in the World War I with the Essex Regiment, holding the rank of 2nd Lieutenant on 15 October 1914. He served until January 1918, when he resigned his commission due to ill health. At this time he held the rank of Captain and was granted that rank on an honorary basis following his resignation. He died at Great Totham, Essex on 25 March 1938.
