= Percy Turrall =

English cricketer

Percy Turrall (16 June 1883 – 17 May 1941) was an English cricketer. He was a right-handed batsman who played first-class cricket for Essex in the 1927 season. He was born in Brentwood and died in Chelmsford.

Turrall played a single first-class match for the team, at the age of 44, a university match in the 1927 season against Oxford University. In the only innings in which he played, he put on 45 runs from the top of the order. However, he would not play again for the team.
