= Reginald Taylor (cricketer) =

English cricketer

Personal information
- Full name: Reginald Minshall Taylor
- Born: 30 September 1909; Southend-on-Sea, Essex, England
- Died: 7 January 1984 (aged 74); Hillbrow, Johannesburg, South Africa
- Batting: Right-handed
- Bowling: Slow left-arm orthodox

Domestic team information
- Years: Team
- 1931–1946: Essex

Career statistics
Competition	FC
Matches	206
Runs scored	6755
Batting average	20.59
100s/50s	5/27
Top score	193
Balls bowled	4654
Wickets	92
Bowling average	31.88
5 wickets in innings	3
10 wickets in match	0
Best bowling	7/99
Catches/stumpings	185/0
- Source: Cricinfo, 15 January 2017

Reginald Minshall Taylor (30 November 1909 – 7 January 1984) was an English cricketer who played first-class cricket for Essex from 1931 to 1946.

He was the first professional cricketer to win the DFC, for service as an observer in Bomber Command at Dunkirk in 1940.

Dudley Carew said of him:

In the early 'thirties Taylor would have gone down on a short list [of] the most promising young batsmen in England, but somehow he could never get into the habit of making runs consistently. He had a charming cut, and could not make a stroke that was ungraceful, but whether it was some unconscious negligence in his make-up ... or some flaw in his technique, his batting average was a constant disappointment.
