= James Barnfather =

English cricketer

Personal information
- Full name: James David Barnfather
- Born: 22 July 1896; Leicester, Leicestershire, England
- Died: 21 August 1957 (aged 61); Thurrock, Essex, England
- Batting: Right-handed
- Bowling: Right-arm fast-medium

Domestic team information
- Years: Team
- 1924: Essex

Career statistics
Competition	FC
Matches	5
Runs scored	50
Batting average	25.00
100s/50s	–/–
Top score	28*
Balls bowled	665
Wickets	13
Bowling average	27.30
5 wickets in innings	1
10 wickets in match	–
Best bowling	6/32
Catches/stumpings	1/–
- Source: Cricinfo, 27 December 2010

James David Barnfather (22 July 1896 – 21 August 1957) was an English cricketer. Barnfather was a right-handed batsman who bowled right-arm fast-medium. He was born in Leicester, Leicestershire.

Barnfather played 5 first-class matches for Essex in the 1924 County Championship, making his debut against Kent and playing his final match against Leicestershire. In his 5 first-class matches, he scored 50 runs at a batting average of 25.00, with a high score of 28*. With the ball, he took 13 wickets at a bowling average of 27.30, with best figures of 6/32-his only five wicket haul.

He died in Thurrock, Essex, on 21 August 1957.
