= George Rowley (cricketer) =

English cricketer

Personal information
- Full name: George William Rowley
- Born: 10 May 1896; Brabourne, Kent, England
- Died: 8 August 1953 (aged 57); Newlyn, Cornwall, England
- Batting: Right-handed
- Role: Batsman

Domestic team information
- Years: Team
- 1926–1933: Essex

Career statistics
Competition	FC
Matches	6
Runs scored	73
Batting average	9.12
100s/50s	0/0
Top score	23
Balls bowled	60
Wickets	0
Bowling average
5 wickets in innings
10 wickets in match
Best bowling
Catches/stumpings	0/0
- Source: Cricinfo, 21 July 2013

George Rowley (10 May 1896 – 8 August 1953) was an English cricketer. He played for Essex between 1926 and 1933.
