= George Sutton (cricketer) =

English cricketer

George Sutton (1 October 1887 – 16 January 1949) was an English cricketer. He was a right-handed batsman who played for Essex. He was born in West Ham and died in Penge.

Sutton made one first-class appearance for Essex, against Yorkshire during the 1912 season – though he was removed for a duck – in the middle of an Alonzo Drake hat-trick.

Sutton was a tailend batsman.
