= Frank Street (cricketer) =

English cricketer

Personal information
- Born: 31 May 1870; Kensington, London, England
- Died: 7 July 1916 (aged 46); Ovillers La Boiselle, France
- Batting: Right-handed
- Role: Batsman

Domestic team information
- Years: Team
- 1898–1899: Essex

Career statistics
Competition	FC
Matches	9
Runs scored	246
Batting average	22.36
100s/50s	0/2
Top score	76
Balls bowled	10
Wickets	0
Bowling average	-
5 wickets in innings	0
10 wickets in match	0
Best bowling	0-14
Catches/stumpings	4/-
- Source: Cricinfo, 25 July 2013

Frank Street (31 May 1870 – 7 July 1916) was an English cricketer. He played for Essex between 1898 and 1899. He was killed in action during World War I.
