= Colin McIver =

English cricketer

Personal information
- Full name: Colin Donald McIver
- Born: 23 January 1881; Hong Kong
- Died: 13 May 1954 (aged 73); Oxford, England
- Batting: Right-handed
- Role: Wicket-keeper

Domestic team information
- Years: Team
- 1902–1934: Essex

Career statistics
Competition	FC
Matches	134
Runs scored	4651
Batting average	22.25
100s/50s	5/-
Top score	134
Balls bowled	90
Wickets	1
Bowling average	40.00
5 wickets in innings	0
10 wickets in match	0
Best bowling	1/4
Catches/stumpings	98/24
- Source: Cricinfo, 23 July 2013

Colin McIver (23 January 1881 – 13 May 1954) was an English cricketer. He played for Essex between 1902 and 1934.

Just after the Second World War, Colin McIver lived in Ashtead, Surrey. He was President of the local Ashtead Cricket Club. McIver was a great friend of Sir Henry Dudley Gresham Leveson Gower, who was an English cricketer (from the Leveson-Gower family). He played first-class cricket for Oxford University, as did Colin McIver, and he also captained Surrey and England.

Colin McIver instituted the annual Leverson-Gower v Ashtead annual cricket event.
