= John Bonner (cricketer) =

English cricketer

Personal information
- Full name: John Wardell Bonner
- Born: 3 April 1869; Mile End, London, England
- Died: 26 November 1936 (aged 67); Bournemouth, Hampshire, England
- Batting: Right-handed
- Role: Batsman

Domestic team information
- Years: Team
- 1896–1898: Essex

Career statistics
Competition	FC
Matches	16
Runs scored	339
Batting average
100s/50s
Top score
Balls bowled
Wickets
Bowling average
5 wickets in innings
10 wickets in match
Best bowling
Catches/stumpings
- Source: Cricinfo, 27 July 2013

John Bonner (3 April 1869 – 26 November 1936) was an English cricketer. He played for Essex between 1896 and 1898.
