= Whiz Morris =

English cricketer

Personal information
- Full name: Harold Marsh Morris
- Born: 16 April 1898; Wanstead, Essex, England
- Died: 18 November 1984 (aged 86); Brighton, Sussex, England
- Nickname: Whiz
- Batting: Right-handed

Domestic team information
- Years: Team
- 1919–1932: Essex

Career statistics
Competition	FC
Matches	246
Runs scored	7086
Batting average	19.52
100s/50s	3/34
Top score	166
Balls bowled	1439
Wickets	16
Bowling average	55.43
5 wickets in innings	0
10 wickets in match	0
Best bowling	2/16
Catches/stumpings	80/0
- Source: Cricinfo, 21 July 2013

Harold Marsh "Whiz" Morris (16 April 1898 – 18 November 1984) was an English amateur cricketer. He played for Essex between 1919 and 1932 and was captain of the team between 1929 and 1932.

Morris was educated at Repton School, where he captained the First XI, and Cambridge University, where he was unable to find a place in the cricket team. He was a regular member of the Essex side in the 1920s, batting usefully and fielding superbly. In 1927 he scored 143 against Somerset and, a couple of weeks later, 166 against Hampshire, when he added 233 in 140 minutes for the fourth wicket with Jack Russell.

Although Morris played only three matches in 1928, the Essex committee chose him to captain the team for the 1929 season, replacing Johnny Douglas. The 46-year-old Douglas opposed the appointment on the grounds that Morris was unqualified both as a cricketer and a captain, but Morris captained the team with reasonable success for the next three seasons. In 1930 the county finished sixth in the County Championship, owing in part to the "infectious enthusiasm" of Morris's captaincy. Although he was appointed captain for the 1932 season he was unavailable for all but two matches, and resigned the captaincy. His Wisden obituary described him as a batsman as "a good stylist, who drove and cut well, [who] looked at his best capable of more than he in fact accomplished".
