= Edward Missen =

English cricketer

Edward Missen (2 February 1875 – 17 November 1927) was an English cricketer. He was a right-handed medium-pace bowler who played first-class cricket for Essex.

Missen made his first and only County Championship appearance almost 17 years after appearing for Cambridgeshire in the Minor Counties Championship in 1904. A middle order batsman alongside captain JWHT Douglas, Missen hit 8 runs in his first innings and 12 in his second.
