= Tray Grinter =

English cricketer (1885–1966)

Trayton Golding Grinter (born 12 December 1885 in Leytonstone, Essex, died 21 April 1966 in Frinton-on-Sea) was a cricketer who played eight matches of first-class cricket as an amateur for Essex between 1909 and 1921, scoring 201 runs at 16.75 with a highest score of 49 not out.

A right-handed batsman, Grinter was handicapped by a severe wound to his left arm that he suffered while serving with the Artists Rifles during the Battle of Loos in 1915, which rendered his left hand almost useless. However, by changing his batting style he was able to continue with great success in club cricket. In all club matches in 1922 he scored 2991 runs at an average of 96.48. He recorded his 100th century when he made 141 for Wanstead against Woodford Wells in 1924, and eventually made more than 200 centuries. He once scored 245 for Essex's club and ground team.

He joined the wine merchants Cockburn and Co. as an office boy in 1900 and became chairman of the company in 1933.
