= Sam Meston =

English cricketer

Personal information
- Full name: Samuel Paul Meston
- Born: 19 November 1882; Islington, London, England
- Died: 6 January 1960 (aged 77); Vancouver, British Columbia, Canada
- Batting: Right-handed
- Role: Batsman

Domestic team information
- Years: Team
- 1906: Gloucestershire
- 1907–1908: Essex

Career statistics
Competition	First-class
Matches	20
Runs scored	516
Batting average	15.63
100s/50s	1/0
Top score	130
Balls bowled	62
Wickets	1
Bowling average	65.00
5 wickets in innings	0
10 wickets in match	0
Best bowling	1/10
Catches/stumpings	11/–
- Source: Cricinfo, 22 July 2013

Samuel Paul Meston (19 November 1882 – 9 January 1960) was an English cricketer. He played for Gloucestershire in 1906 and Essex between 1907 and 1908. He later moved to Canada where he continued playing cricket.
