= Brian Warsop =

English cricketer

Personal information
- Full name: Brian Warsop
- Born: 12 January 1904; Willesden, Middlesex, England
- Died: 18 March 1993 (aged 89); Melbourne, Victoria, Australia
- Batting: Right-handed
- Bowling: Slow left-arm orthodox
- Relatives: Son; Brian Aubrey Warsop born 20.12.1931; died 14.2.2025 aged 93

Domestic team information
- Years: Team
- 1931–1932: Essex

Career statistics
Competition	First-class
Matches	5
Runs scored	128
Batting average	16.00
100s/50s	–/1
Top score	51
Balls bowled	–
Wickets	–
Bowling average	–
5 wickets in innings	–
10 wickets in match	–
Best bowling	–
Catches/stumpings	1/–
- Source: Cricinfo, 23 October 2011

Brian Warsop (12 January 1904 – 18 March 1993) was an English cricketer. Warsop was a right-handed batsman who bowled slow left-arm orthodox. He was born at Willesden, Middlesex.

Warsop made his first-class debut for Essex in the 1931 County Championship against Northamptonshire. He made four further first-class appearances for the county, all of which came in the 1932 County Championship, with the last coming against Leicestershire. In his five appearances he scored 128 runs at an average of 16.00, with a high score of 51. This score, which was his only first-class fifty, came against Warwickshire in 1932.

Brian immigrated to Australia in 1933 with his wife and son. They settled in Brunswick a suburb of Melbourne, Victoria. He moved to assist his brother Roy (who had already moved to Australia) to expand production of Warsop cricket bats to the Australian Market. Brian and Roy were the sons of Walter Warsop, a cricket bat maker from Little Baddow, Chelmsford, Essex in the UK. Walter manufactured the bat with which Sr. Donald Bradman scored his first ever test century in 1929 against England.By the late 1950's to early 1960's he was only making the cricket bat handles which he manufactured by hand on a lathe in his workshop in Brunswick. He died in Melbourne, Australia on 18 March 1993 leaving his son Brian Aubrey Warsop, grand daughters Pamela and Carolyn and great grand daughters Jessica, Rebecca, Rachel and Ruth.
