= James Hyndson =

English cricketer

James Gerard Wyndham Hyndson (25 April 1892 – 23 February 1935) was an English first-class cricketer active 1921–27 who played for Surrey. He was born in Cape Town, Cape Colony; died in Holborn.
