= Hugh Owen (cricketer) =

English cricketer and footballer

Personal information
- Full name: Hugh Glendwr Palmer Owen
- Born: 19 May 1859; Bath, Somerset, England
- Died: 20 October 1912 (aged 53); Dengie, Essex, England
- Batting: Right-handed
- Role: Batsman

Domestic team information
- Years: Team
- 1882–1902: Essex

Career statistics
Competition	FC
Matches	136
Runs scored	4510
Batting average	21.37
100s/50s	3/27
Top score	134
Balls bowled	608
Wickets	9
Bowling average	36.88
5 wickets in innings	0
10 wickets in match	0
Best bowling	2/37
Catches/stumpings	38/0
- Source: Cricinfo, 27 July 2013

Hugh Glendwr Palmer Owen (19 May 1859 – 20 October 1912) was an English cricketer. He played for Essex between 1882 and 1902.

== Sporting career ==
Owen was educated privately and at Corpus Christi College, Cambridge. He captained Essex from 1895 until his retirement from first-class cricket in 1901. An opening batsman, his highest first-class score was 134 against Hampshire in 1900, when Essex won by 206 runs.

He also played football. He signed for Corpus Christi College as an amateur player in 1887. The following year, in November, he signed for Notts County and played in The Football League.

His league and club debut was when he was brought into the first team, as goalkeeper, to replace the injured Jack Holland. The match was played at Trent Bridge, Nottingham and was against the eventual Football League Champions, known as 'The Invincibles", Preston North End. Within the first ten minutes Hugh Owen had conceded two. The scorers were John Goodall and Jack Gordon. County came into the game after that and Tom Allin forced a fine save from Jimmy Trainer, the North End goalkeeper. In the second-half North End overwhelmed their opponents. Owen saved a shot from Gordon but was legally barged over the line by Goodall for his second. Jimmy Ross then scored a fourth for North End. Gordon scored his second goal and then, shortly after scoring, secured his hat-trick. Goodall, near the end, went on a mazy run to complete his hat-trick. Full-Time Score – Notts County 0–7 Preston North End.

That was Hugh Owen's only game for Notts County. In the following year he signed for Football Alliance club, Nottingham Forest.

Owen was a schoolmaster for nine years at Trent College in Derbyshire, where his brother, the Rev. J. R. B. Owen, was headmaster. He died in Essex in October 1912 at the age of 53.
