= John Burrell (cricketer) =

English cricketer (1870–1948)

Reginald John Burrell (26 August 1870 – 16 March 1948) was an English cricketer active from 1894 to 1904 who played for Essex. He was born in Kirtling and died in Suffolk. He appeared in ten first-class matches and scored 200 runs with a highest score of 40.
