= Ken Preston =

English cricketer (1925–2019)

Personal information
- Full name: Kenneth Charles Preston
- Born: 22 August 1925; Goodmayes, Essex, England
- Died: 6 January 2019 (aged 93)
- Batting: Right-handed
- Role: Bowler

Domestic team information
- Years: Team
- 1948–1964: Essex

Career statistics
| Competition | FC | List A |
|---|---|---|
| Matches | 397 | 2 |
| Runs scored | 3053 | 6 |
| Batting average | 10.21 | 6.00 |
| 100s/50s | | 0/0 |
| Top score | 70 | 4* |
| Balls bowled | | 168 |
| Wickets | 1160 | 3 |
| Bowling average | 26.32 | 36.66 |
| 5 wickets in innings | 37 | 0 |
| 10 wickets in match | 2 | 0 |
| Best bowling | 7/55 | 2/39 |
| Catches/stumpings | 350/0 | 1/0 |
- Source: Cricinfo, 11 February 2019

Kenneth Charles Preston (22 August 1925 – 6 January 2019) was an English cricketer. He played for Essex between 1948 and 1964.

Preston was born in Goodmayes and served with the Royal Navy during World War 2, taking part in the Normandy Landings as a landing craft crew member. He made his first-class cricket debut in 1948 and impressed as a fast bowler in his first season. During the following winter he broke his leg playing football and missed the entire 1949 cricket season. When he resumed playing in 1950 he had lost some of his bowling speed but regained form and full fitness by 1951 and bowled well for the next three seasons. After losing form again and being dropped in 1954 Preston concentrated on accuracy rather than pace, and performed consistently until his retirement at the end of the 1964 season. His best season was 1957, when he took 140 wickets at an average of 20 runs each. After retiring from playing he coached cricket at Brentwood School.
