= John Herringshaw =

English cricketer (1892–1974)

Personal information
- Full name: John Percy Herringshaw
- Born: 22 May 1892; Derby, Derbyshire, England
- Died: 13 November 1974 (aged 82); Yapton, Sussex, England
- Batting: Left-handed
- Bowling: Slow left-arm orthodox

Domestic team information
- Years: Team
- 1921–1922: Essex

Career statistics
| Competition | First-class |
|---|---|
| Matches | 9 |
| Runs scored | 94 |
| Batting average | 10.44 |
| 100s/50s | –/– |
| Top score | 18 |
| Balls bowled | 902 |
| Wickets | 9 |
| Bowling average | 55.33 |
| 5 wickets in innings | – |
| 10 wickets in match | – |
| Best bowling | 2/48 |
| Catches/stumpings | 7/– |
- Source: Cricinfo, 27 October 2011

John Percy Herringshaw (22 May 1892 – 13 November 1974) was an English cricketer. Herringshaw was a left-handed batsman who bowled slow left-arm orthodox. He was born at Derby, Derbyshire.

Herringshaw made his first-class debut for Essex against Northamptonshire in the 1921 County Championship. He made eight further first-class appearances for the county, the last of which came against Surrey in the 1922 County Championship. He scored a total of 94 runs in these nine matches at an average of 10.44, with a high score of 18. With the ball, he took 9 wickets at a bowling average of 55.33, with best figures of 2/48.

Herringshaw died at Yapton, Sussex on 13 November 1974, aged 82.
