= Percy Toone =

English cricketer

Personal information
- Born: 27 July 1883; Colchester, Essex, England
- Died: 4 February 1955 (aged 71); Isleworth, Middlesex, England
- Batting: Right-handed
- Role: Bowler

Domestic team information
- Years: Team
- 1912–1922: Essex

Career statistics
| Competition | FC |
|---|---|
| Matches | 29 |
| Runs scored | 215 |
| Batting average |
| 100s/50s |
| Top score |
| Balls bowled |
| Wickets | 62 |
| Bowling average |
| 5 wickets in innings |
| 10 wickets in match |
| Best bowling |
| Catches/stumpings |
- Source: Cricinfo, 22 July 2013

Percy Toone (27 July 1883 – 4 February 1955) was an English cricketer. He played for Essex between 1912 and 1922.
