= Arthur Martin (cricketer) =

English cricketer

Personal information
- Full name: Arthur Dalby Martin
- Born: 9 November 1888; Hackney, London, England
- Died: 12 July 1958 (aged 69); Northwood, Middlesex, England
- Batting: Unknown
- Bowling: Unknown

Domestic team information
- Years: Team
- 1920–1921: Essex

Career statistics
Competition	First-class
Matches	3
Runs scored	0
Batting average	0.00
100s/50s	–/–
Top score	0
Balls bowled	306
Wickets	5
Bowling average	42.00
5 wickets in innings	–
10 wickets in match	–
Best bowling	3/43
Catches/stumpings	1/–
- Source: Cricinfo, 26 October 2011

Arthur Dalby Martin (9 November 1888 – 12 July 1958) was an English cricketer. Martin's batting and bowling styles are unknown. He was born at Hackney, London.

Martin made three first-class appearances for Essex against Somerset in 1920 and Northamptonshire and Middlesex in 1921. He had three batting innings, making a duck in each. He also took a total of 5 wickets in these matches, which came at an average of 42.00, with best figures of 3/43.

He died on 12 July 1958 at Northwood, Middlesex.
