= Keith Butler (English cricketer) =

English cricketer (born 1971)

Personal information
- Full name: Keith Andrew Butler
- Born: 20 January 1971 (age 55); Camden Town, London, England
- Batting: Right-handed
- Bowling: Right-arm medium

Domestic team information
- Years: Team
- 1993: Suffolk
- 1989–1992: Essex

Career statistics
Competition	FC	LA
Matches	1	5
Runs scored	10	23
Batting average	–	11.50
100s/50s	–/–	–/–
Top score	10*	17
Balls bowled	–	6
Wickets	–	–
Bowling average	–	–
5 wickets in innings	–	–
10 wickets in match	–	–
Best bowling	–	–
Catches/stumpings	–/–	2/–
- Source: Cricinfo, 27 November 2010

Keith Andrew Butler (born 20 January 1971) is a former English cricketer. Butler was a right-handed batsman who bowled right-arm medium pace. He was born in Camden Town, London.

Butler made his one and only first-class appearance for Essex in 1989 against Cambridge University. In his match he scored an unbeaten 10 runs.

Butler made his List A debut for Essex in the same season against Somerset. From 1989 to 1992, he represented the county in 4 List A matches, the last of which came against Gloucestershire. At the end of the 1992 season he was released by Essex.

The following season the joined Suffolk. During that season he played his final List A match in his only appearance in that format for Suffolk, which came against Essex in the 1993 NatWest Trophy. In his career total of 5 List A matches, he scored 23 runs at a batting average of 11.50, with a high score of 17. In the field he took 2 catches.

It was during the 1993 season that he made his Minor Counties Championship debut against Bedfordshire. During the 1993 season he represented the county in 8 Championship matches, the last of which came against Northumberland. He made a single MCCA Knockout Trophy appearance for the county in the same season against Cambridgeshire. The 1993 season was his only season with Suffolk.
