= Henry Franklin (cricketer) =

English cricketer

Personal information
- Full name: Henry William Fernehough Franklin
- Born: 30 June 1901; Ford End, Essex, England
- Died: 25 May 1985 (aged 83); Worthing, Sussex, England
- Batting: Right-handed
- Role: Bowler

Domestic team information
- Years: Team
- 1921–1931: Essex

Career statistics
Competition	FC
Matches	92
Runs scored	2212
Batting average	19.23
100s/50s	2/-
Top score	106
Balls bowled	3048
Wickets	46
Bowling average	43.52
5 wickets in innings	0
10 wickets in match	0
Best bowling	4/40
Catches/stumpings	41/0
- Source: Cricinfo, 21 July 2013

Henry William Fernehough Franklin (30 June 1901 – 25 May 1985) was an English cricketer and school headmaster.

Franklin was educated at Christ's Hospital and Christ Church, Oxford. After graduating he taught at Radley College 1924–27 and at Rugby School 1927–39. He was headmaster of Epsom College 1940–62. He was a member of the Advertising Standards Authority 1962–67.

He played cricket for Oxford University, Surrey and Essex between 1921 and 1931. He also played rugby for Oxford University and Barbarians.
