= Charles Mercer (cricketer) =

English cricketer

Charles Mercer (28 April 1896 — 20 November 1965) was an English cricketer. He was a left-handed batsman who played for Essex in 1929. He was born in Hackney and died in Basildon.

Mercer's debut came against Leicestershire, where in his first innings, he hit his career-best score of merely 8 runs. His second and final first-class appearance came less than a week later, in a heavy Essex defeat in which he underperformed with the bat, and was dropped from the team.
