= Frederick Unwin =

English cricketer

Personal information
- Full name: Frederick St George Unwin
- Born: 23 April 1911; Halstead, Essex, England
- Died: 4 October 1990 (aged 79); Braintree, Essex, England
- Batting: Right-handed
- Role: Batsman

Domestic team information
- Years: Team
- 1932–1951: Essex

Career statistics
Competition	FC
Matches	53
Runs scored	1138
Batting average	14.58
100s/50s	0/3
Top score	60
Balls bowled	72
Wickets
Bowling average
5 wickets in innings
10 wickets in match
Best bowling
Catches/stumpings	33/0
- Source: Cricinfo, 20 July 2013

Frederick St George Unwin (23 April 1911 – 4 October 1990) was an English cricketer. He played for Essex between 1932 and 1951 as a right-handed lower-order batsman, and captained the team in 1939.
