= Brian Taylor (cricketer) =

English cricketer (1932–2017)

Personal information
- Born: 19 June 1932; West Ham, Essex, England
- Died: 12 June 2017 (aged 84)
- Nickname: Tonker
- Batting: Left-handed
- Role: Wicketkeeper, Batsman

Domestic team information
- Years: Team
- 1949–1973: Essex
- FC debut: 7 May 1949 Essex v Cambridge University
- Last FC: 31 August 1973 Essex v Nottinghamshire
- LA debut: 22 May 1963 Essex v Lancashire
- Last LA: 2 September 1973 Essex v Warwickshire

Career statistics
Competition	First-class	List A
Matches	572	108
Runs scored	19,093	1,837
Batting average	21.79	18.74
100s/50s	9/82	1/3
Top score	135	100
Balls bowled	57	–
Wickets	1	–
Bowling average	30.00	–
5 wickets in innings	0	–
10 wickets in match	0	–
Best bowling	1/16	–
Catches/stumpings	1,084/211	93/22
- Source: CricketArchive, 15 June 2017

Brian Taylor (19 June 1932 – 12 June 2017) was an English cricketer who played for and captained Essex County Cricket Club.

Known as "Tonker" Taylor for his forthright approach to batting and his evident enjoyment of the game, Taylor was a high-class wicketkeeper who was thought of in his early playing days as a potential successor to Godfrey Evans as England's keeper. He was named as Young Cricketer of the Year in 1956 by the Cricket Writers' Club, his first full season, though he had made his first-class debut seven years earlier. He toured South Africa with the Marylebone Cricket Club (MCC) side in 1956-57 as understudy to Evans, but did not feature in any of the Test matches as Evans had one of his most brilliant Test series.

In the event, his left-handed batting did not develop as much as had been hoped, and the Test call never came. But Taylor still had a long and distinguished career in county cricket. From 1961 to 1972, he played in 301 consecutive County Championship matches for Essex, and he captained the county from 1967 to 1973, when he retired. Under his captaincy, Essex assembled the nucleus of the young team that was to bring the county its first-ever trophies in the years after Taylor retired.

In all cricket, Taylor made 1,294 dismissals, which puts him seventh on the all-time list of wicketkeepers. He also made more than 19,000 runs in a total of 572 first-class matches. He was selected as a Wisden Cricketer of the Year in 1972. He was a Test selector for England from 1973. He took part in the first cricket tour of Bangladesh when MCC visited in 1976-77.

He also played football with Bexleyheath and Welling and Deal Town in the Kent League and Southern League.

He died in 2017.
