= List of Oxford and Cambridge Universities cricket team players =

This is a list in alphabetical order of cricketers who have played for the combined Oxford and Cambridge Universities cricket team in top-class matches since 1839. The team had top-level status and played 18 first-class cricket matches during its history. Seven of these took place between 1839 and 1939 against several teams. The other 11 matches all occurred between 1968 and 1992 and were all played against international teams touring the British Isles. The last time the combined team played a first-class match was in 1992.

The team was generally composed of current students who were members of Cambridge University Cricket Club or Oxford University Cricket Club, but there were four matches between 1874 and 1893 in which a Past and Present combination played matches, with the team title adjusted accordingly. The 41 players who took part in those matches are included in this list.

The details are the player's usual name followed by the years in which he played for the team and then his name as it would appear on modern match scorecards (usually his surname preceded by all initials). Note that many players represented other first-class teams.

== A ==
- Charlie Absolom (1874) : C. A. Absolom
- Jeremy Allerton (1969) : J. W. O. Allerton
- Thomas Anson (1839) : T. A. Anson
- Harold Arkwright (1893) : H. A. Arkwright
- Trevor Arnott (1922) : T. Arnott
- Jonathan Arscott (1992) : J. P. Arscott
- Asad Jahangir Khan (1968) : Asad Jahangir Khan
- Hubert Ashton (1922) : H. Ashton
- Michael Atherton (1987) : M. A. Atherton
- Jon Atkinson (1990) : J. C. M. Atkinson
- Christopher Aworth (1973–1974) : C. J. Aworth

== B ==
- Paul Bail (1986–1987) : P. A. C. Bail
- Herbert Bainbridge (1893) : H. W. Bainbridge
- Richard Baker (1974) : R. K. Baker
- Robert Bardsley (1911) : R. V. Bardsley
- Robert Bathurst (1839) : R. A. Bathurst
- Brian Belle (1938) : B. H. Belle
- George Berkeley (1893) : G. F. H. Berkeley
- Reg Bettington (1922) : R. H. B. Bettington
- William Blacker (1874) : W. Blacker
- Clement Booth (1874) : C. Booth
- Norman Botton (1974) : N. D. Botton
- Robin Boyd-Moss (1981) : R. J. Boyd-Moss
- Pat Brain (1922) : J. H. P. Brain
- Mike Brearley (1968) : J. M. Brearley
- Arthur Brodhurst (1938) : A. H. Brodhurst
- Mervyn Brooker (1976) : M. E. W. Brooker
- Henry Brougham (1911) : H. Brougham
- Adrian Brown (1986) : A. D. Brown
- John Bruce-Lockhart (1910) : J. H. Bruce-Lockhart
- Charles Brune (1874) : C. J. Brune
- David Buchanan (1874) : D. Buchanan
- Mike Burton (1969) : M. S. W. Burton
- Alan Buzza (1990) : A. J. Buzza

== C ==
- John Cameron (1938) : J. H. Cameron
- Philip Carling (1969) : P. G. Carling
- Joseph William Chitty (1848) : J. W. Chitty
- Edward Coleman (1911) : E. C. Coleman
- Charles Coleridge (1848) : C. E. Coleridge
- David Collins (1910) : D. C. Collins
- Norman Cooper (1890) : N. C. Cooper
- Algernon Coote (1839) : A. Coote
- Graham Cottrell (1968) : G. A. Cottrell
- Stephen Coverdale (1976) : S. P. Coverdale
- Alexander Cowie (1910) : A. G. Cowie
- John Crawley (1992) : J. P. Crawley
- Mark Crawley (1990) : M. A. Crawley
- Gerry Crutchley (1911) : G. E. V. Crutchley
- Cecil Currie (1888–1890) : C. E. Currie

== D ==
- John Davidson (1986) : J. E. Davidson
- William Davies (1848) : W. H. Davies
- Ryle de Soysa (1938) : G. R. J. de Soysa
- William Deacon (1848) : W. S. Deacon
- Eric Dixon (1938) : E. J. H. Dixon

== E ==
- Phil Edmonds (1972–1973) : P. H. Edmonds
- Richard Ellis (1981) : R. G. P. Ellis
- John Evans (1910–1911) : A. J. Evans

== F ==
- Michael Falcon (1910) : M. Falcon
- David Fell (1986–1987) : D. J. Fell
- Tim Firth (1987) : T. Firth
- James Fitzgerald (1968) : J. F. Fitzgerald
- Henry Forster (1890–1893) : H. W. Forster
- Henry Franklin (1922) : H. W. F. Franklin
- Frederick Fryer (1874) : F. E. R. Fryer
- David Fursdon (1974) : E. D. Fursdon

== G ==
- Jason Gallian (1992) : J. E. R. Gallian
- William Game (1874) : W. H. Game
- Alan Garofall (1968) : A. R. Garofall
- Leslie Gay (1893) : L. H. Gay
- Phil Gerrans (1990) : P. S. Gerrans
- Chris Goldie (1981) : C. F. E. Goldie
- Andrew Golding (1986) : A. K. Golding
- Frederick Goldstein (1968–1969) : F. S. Goldstein
- Francis Gresson (1890) : F. H. Gresson
- Joseph Grout (1839) : J. Grout

== H ==
- Robert Hadley (1972–1973) : R. J. Hadley
- David Hagan (1986) : D. A. Hagan
- Bryan Hamblin (1973) : C. B. Hamblin
- William Hammersley (1848) : W. J. Hammersley
- Lord Harris (1888) : Lord Harris
- Lord Hawke (1890) : Lord Hawke
- Hartley Heard (1969) : H. Heard
- Perceval Henery (1888) : P. J. T. Henery
- Phillip Hodson (1973) : R. P. Hodson
- Norman Holloway (1911) : N. J. Holloway
- Antony Hooper (1992) : A. M. Hooper
- John Hornsby (1893) : J. H. J. Hornsby
- Miles Howell (1922) : M. Howell
- Owen Hughes (1910) : O. Hughes

== I ==
- Imran Khan (1973–1974) : Imran Khan

== J ==
- Edward Jackson (1976) : E. J. W. Jackson
- Steve James (1990) : S. P. James
- Michael Jeh (1992) : M. P. W. Jeh
- Peter Johnson (1972) : P. D. Johnson
- Keith Jones (1972–1973) : A. K. C. Jones
- Peter Jones (1972) : P. C. H. Jones
- Thomas Jones (1874) : T. B. Jones
- Tony Jorden (1969) : A. M. Jorden

== K ==
- Michael Kaye (1938) : M. A. C. P. Kaye
- Christopher Keey (1992) : C. L. Keey
- Leslie Kidd (1910–1911) : E. L. Kidd
- Michael Kilborn (1987–1990) : M. J. Kilborn
- Roger Kimpton (1938) : R. C. M. Kimpton
- Robert Turner King (1848) : R. T. King
- Roger Knight (1968–1969) : R. D. V. Knight

== L ==
- Francis Lacey (1890) : F. E. Lacey
- Ronald Lagden (1911) : R. O. Lagden
- Tim Lamb (1974) : T. M. Lamb
- Godfrey Lee (1839) : G. B. Lee
- John Lee (1848) : J. M. Lee
- Rick Lee (1973) : R. J. Lee
- H. D. G. Leveson Gower (1922) : H. D. G. Leveson Gower
- Tinsley Lindley (1893) : T. Lindley
- Willie Llewelyn (1890) : W. D. Llewelyn
- Geoff Lovell (1992) : G. B. T. Lovell

== M ==
- Gregor MacGregor (1890) : G. MacGregor
- Michael Magill (1938) : M. D. P. Magill
- Majid Khan (1972) : Majid Khan
- Vic Marks (1976) : V. J. Marks
- William Massey (1839) : W. Massey
- Colin McIver (1922) : C. D. McIver
- Peter Mills (1981) : J. P. C. Mills
- Walter Monckton (1911) : W. T. Monckton
- Richard Montgomerie (1992) : R. R. Montgomerie
- George Morley (1848) : G. Morley
- Russell Morris (1990) : R. E. Morris
- John Stanton Fleming Morrison (1922) : J. S. F. Morrison
- Roger Moulding (1981) : R. P. Moulding
- Bill Murray-Wood (1938) : W. Murray-Wood
- Timothy Murrills (1974–1976) : T. J. Murrills

== N ==
- Charles Napier (1839) : C. W. A. Napier

== O ==
- Jonathan Orders (1981) : J. O. D. Orders
- Dudley Owen-Thomas (1972) : D. R. Owen-Thomas

== P ==
- Paul Parker (1976) : P. W. G. Parker
- Gajan Pathmanathan (1976) : G. Pathmanathan
- W. H. Patterson (1888) : W. H. Patterson
- William Patterson (1874) : W. S. Patterson
- Guy Pawson (1910) : A. G. Pawson
- Hugh Pearman (1969) : H. Pearman
- Richard Pearson (1992) : R. M. Pearson
- Ian Peck (1981) : I. G. Peck
- Jonathan Perry (1987) : J. N. Perry
- Herbert Pigg (1888) : H. Pigg
- Graham Pointer (1987) : G. A. Pointer
- Mano Ponniah (1968–1969) : C. E. M. Ponniah
- Albert Porter (1890) : A. L. Porter
- David Price (1986–1987) : D. G. Price
- Derek Pringle (1981) : D. R. Pringle
- Richard Pyman (1990) : R. A. Pyman

== R ==
- Ranjitsinhji (1893) : Ranjitsinhji
- W. Rashleigh (1888) : W. Rashleigh
- George Ricketts (1888) : G. W. Ricketts
- Charles Ridding (1848) : C. H. Ridding
- R. C. Robertson-Glasgow (1922) : R. C. Robertson-Glasgow
- Bill Roe (1888–1893) : W. N. Roe
- Peter Roebuck (1976) : P. M. Roebuck
- Neil Russom (1981) : N. Russom
- Richard Rutnagur (1986) : R. S. Rutnagur

== S ==
- Malcolm Salter (1910) : M. G. Salter
- Rajdeep Sardesai (1987) : R. D. Sardesai
- Richard Savage (1976) : R. L. Savage
- Stanley Saville (1911) : S. H. Saville
- Edward Sayres (1839) : E. Sayres
- Alastair Scott (1986) : A. M. G. Scott
- Ernest Smith (1890) : E. Smith
- Richard Smyth (1974) : R. I. Smyth
- William Snowden (1973–1974) : W. Snowden
- John Spencer (1972) : J. Spencer
- Michael Stallibrass (1974) : M. J. D. Stallibrass
- Keith Steele (1972) : H. K. C. Steele
- Ronald Sturdy (1938) : R. G. Sturdy
- Simon Sutcliffe (1981) : S. P. Sutcliffe

== T ==
- Chris Tavaré (1976) : C. J. Tavaré
- Charles Taylor (1839) : C. G. Taylor
- Chilton Taylor (1972–1973) : C. R. V. Taylor
- Timothy Taylor (1981) : T. J. Taylor
- Frederick Thackeray (1839) : F. Thackeray
- David Thorne (1986) : D. A. Thorne
- Albert Thornton (1888) : A. J. Thornton
- Richard Thornton (1888) : R. T. Thornton
- Charles Tillard (1874) : C. Tillard
- Chris Tooley (1986–1987) : C. D. M. Tooley
- Charles Trouncer (1890) : C. A. Trouncer
- Frank Tuff (1910) : F. N. Tuff
- Graeme Turner (1990) : G. J. Turner
- Robert Turner (1990) : R. J. Turner
- Richard Twining (1910) : R. H. Twining
- Henry Tylecote (1874) : H. G. Tylecote

== V ==
- Willem van der Merwe (1990) : W. M. van der Merwe

== W ==
- Michael Walford (1938) : M. M. Walford
- John Walker (1848) : J. Walker
- Guy Waller (1974) : G. D. Waller
- David Walsh (1969) : D. R. Walsh
- John Ward (1972–1973) : J. M. Ward
- Alexander Watson (1968) : A. G. M. Watson
- Simon Weale (1987) : S. D. Weale
- Gerry Weigall (1911) : G. J. V. Weigall
- Stuart Westley (1968–1969) : S. A. Westley
- Robin Whetherly (1938) : R. E. Whetherly
- Archie Wickham (1888) : A. P. Wickham
- Marcus Wight (1992) : R. M. Wight
- David Wilson (1938) : D. C. Wilson
- George Wilson (1893) : G. L. Wilson
- Andrew Wingfield Digby (1976) : A. R. Wingfield Digby
- Benjamin Wood (1992) : B. S. Wood
- Dave Woodhead (1968) : D. L. Woodhead
- Charles Wright (1893) : C. W. Wright
- Philip Wright (1922) : P. A. Wright
- John Wynne (1839) : J. H. G. Wynne

== Y ==
- Gerald Yonge (1848) : G. E. Yonge
