= Edward Coleman =

Edward Coleman may refer to:

- Edward Coleman (martyr), victim of the Titus Oates plot
- Edward Coleman (gangster) (died 1839), Irish gang founder in New York City
- Edward Coleman (miner) (1830–1913), California Gold Rush mine manager, president and superintendent
- Edward Coleman (veterinary surgeon) (1766–1839), English veterinary surgeon
- Edward Coleman (cricketer) (1891–1917), English cricketer

== See also ==
- Ed Coleman (disambiguation)
- Edward Colman (disambiguation)
- Edward Coleman House, San Francisco
