= Edward Dowell =

English cricketer, clergyman, and vicar

Edward William Dowell (1822 – 14 February 1896) was an English cricketer who played in five matches for Cambridge University in 1844 and 1845 which are judged to have been first-class. He was born at Locking, Somerset and died at Dunton, Norfolk. He was educated at Uppingham School. The precise date of his birth is not known: the directory of Cambridge University students identifies that he was aged 19 when he was admitted to Jesus College in February 1842, but also states that he was aged 72 at his death in 1896.

Dowell batted and bowled in his first-class cricket matches, but neither his batting nor his bowling style is known. He played minor matches for Norfolk teams from 1844 through to 1870.

He became a Church of England clergyman and was vicar of Dunton in Norfolk from 1855 to 1896. He had family cricketing connections: his daughter married Cambridge University and Surrey player Charles Tillard and their son, Elliot Dowell Tillard, played for Somerset and for teams in India.
