= George Arbuthnot Scott =

English cricketer (1879–1927)

George Scott
Personal information
- Full name: George Arbuthnot Scott
- Born: 12 April 1879; Wimbledon, London, England
- Died: 8 June 1927 (aged 48); Ore, Hastings, Sussex, England
- Batting: Right-handed
- Bowling: Right-arm fast
- Role: Bowler
- Relatives: Father, Avison, cousin Elliot Tillard

Domestic team information
- Years: Team
- 1900–01: Cambridge University
- First-class debut: 17 May 1900 Cambridge University v Yorkshire
- Last First-class: 25 May 1901 Cambridge University v Yorkshire

Career statistics
Competition	First-class
Matches	5
Runs scored	40
Batting average	6.66
100s/50s	–/–
Top score	10
Balls bowled	570
Wickets	8
Bowling average	33.12
5 wickets in innings	1
10 wickets in match	–
Best bowling	5/72
Catches/stumpings	–/–
- Source: CricketArchive, 15 January 2011

George Arbuthnot Scott (12 April 1879 – 8 June 1927) was a British first-class cricket player for Cambridge University in 1900 and 1901. He was born at Wimbledon, then in Surrey (now London), and died at Ore, Hastings, Sussex.

Educated at Tonbridge School and Emmanuel College, Cambridge, Scott was a right-arm fast bowler and a right-handed tail-end batsman. He played first for Cambridge University in 1900 and in his second match, against Marylebone Cricket Club (MCC), he took five first innings wickets for 72 runs, his wickets being five of the first six MCC batsmen. However, he achieved little in two subsequent games for the university side and did not win a blue. After the university term was over, he appeared in a second eleven match for Kent.

In 1901, Scott was picked for the "seniors'" trial match at Cambridge, and did well, with seven wickets in the match. That led to his recall for one further first-class match with the university first eleven, but he was not successful, failing to take a wicket in the game. When the university term was over in 1901, he played Minor Counties cricket for Norfolk.

== Family ==
Scott was the son of Avison Terry Scott, who had played first-class cricket for Cambridge University and Cambridgeshire in the 1860s and 1870s. His younger brother, Arthur Avison Scott, played one first-class match for the Royal Navy cricket team in 1912. Scott's mother was a Tillard: her brother, Scott's uncle, Charles Tillard, played first-class cricket for Cambridge University and Surrey, and Charles' son Elliot Tillard, Scott's first cousin, played for the Europeans in the Bombay Triangular tournament in India and in 1912 for Somerset.

== See also ==
- http://www.espncricinfo.com/england/content/player/20624.html
