= Elliot Tillard =

English cricketer (1880–1967)

Personal information
- Full name: Elliot Dowell Tillard
- Born: 22 July 1880; Cheltenham, Gloucestershire, England
- Died: 19 February 1967 (aged 86); Flexbury, Bude, Cornwall, England
- Role: All-rounder

Domestic team information
- Years: Team
- 1907/08–1922/23: Europeans
- 1912: Somerset
- FC debut: 12 September 1907 Europeans v Parsees
- Last FC: 13 September 1922 Europeans v Parsees

Career statistics
| Competition | First-class |
|---|---|
| Matches | 16 |
| Runs scored | 357 |
| Batting average | 12.31 |
| 100s/50s | 0/0 |
| Top score | 39 |
| Balls bowled | 419 |
| Wickets | 14 |
| Bowling average | 15.78 |
| 5 wickets in innings | 2 |
| 10 wickets in match | 0 |
| Best bowling | 6/40 |
| Catches/stumpings | 3/– |
- Source: CricketArchive, 15 January 2011

Elliot Dowell Tillard (22 July 1880 – 19 February 1967) was a British officer who played first-class cricket for the Europeans cricket team in India and for Somerset.

== Early life and military career ==
Tillard was born at Cheltenham, Gloucestershire, in 1880. He joined the Royal Engineers as a second lieutenant on 20 August 1899, and was promoted to lieutenant on 1 April 1902. In late 1902 he was stationed in India.

He died at Flexbury, Bude, Cornwall, in 1967.

== Cricket ==
A middle- or lower-order batsman and a fairly regular though usually not front-line bowler, Tillard's batting and bowling styles are not known. His first appearances in first-class cricket were for the Europeans team in the Bombay Presidency matches at Pune and the Bombay Triangular competition. In 1912, he was in England for the cricket season and played nine times for Somerset, playing as a batsman. His highest score in these matches (and his highest in first-class cricket) came in the match against Gloucestershire at Taunton, when he made 39 in the first innings and followed with 29 in the second.

Tillard's final match for Somerset was in late July 1912; less than a month later, he was playing first-class cricket in Pune again, and in the second of two matches at the end of August 1912, and having previously taken only one first-class wicket, he took six for 40 playing for J. G. Greig's XI against the Hindus cricket team, the best bowling performance of his first-class career. Tillard then appeared in only one further first-class cricket match: just over 10 years later, he played in the Bombay Quadrangular tournament for the Europeans against the Parsees cricket team and took five for 71 in the Parsees' second innings, and scored 34, his highest in India, in the Europeans' second innings. As late as 1927, when he was 47, he was playing in non-first-class matches in what is now Pakistan.

== Family ==
Several of Tillard's family played first-class cricket. Tillard's father Charles Tillard played for Cambridge University and Surrey; his grandfather Edward Dowell played for Cambridge University. An uncle Avison Terry Scott played for both Cambridge University and Cambridgeshire in first-class matches; Scott's son George Arbuthnot Scott played for Cambridge University, while a second son (Tillard's cousin) Arthur Avison Scott played one first-class match for the Royal Navy cricket team.
