= David Price (English cricketer) =

English cricketer

Personal information
- Full name: David Gregory Price
- Born: 7 February 1965 (age 61); Luton, Bedfordshire, England
- Batting: Right-handed
- Bowling: Right-arm off break

Domestic team information
- Years: Team
- 1984–1987: Cambridge University
- 1986–1991: Hertfordshire

Career statistics
Competition	First-class	List A
Matches	29	4
Runs scored	785	68
Batting average	17.84	17.00
100s/50s	–/3	–/–
Top score	60	38
Balls bowled	44	0
Wickets	1	–
Bowling average	42.00	–
5 wickets in innings	–	–
10 wickets in match	–	–
Best bowling	1/18	–
Catches/stumpings	8/–	–/–
- Source: Cricinfo, 8 July 2019

David Gregory Price (born 7 February 1965) is an English former cricketer.

Price was born at Luton in February 1965. He was educated at The Haberdashers' Aske's Boys' School and represented England at schoolboy level, before studying at Homerton College, Cambridge. While studying at Cambridge, he made his debut in first-class cricket for Cambridge University against Leicestershire at Fenner's in 1984. He was appointed captain of Cambridge University in 1986 and led the Light Blues to victory over Oxford in that year's Varsity match. He was re-appointed as captain in 1987. He played first-class cricket for Cambridge from 1983 until 1987, making a total of 29 appearances. For Cambridge, he scored 785 runs at an average of 17.84, with a high score of 60. He also made first-class appearances for a combined Oxford and Cambridge Universities cricket team against the touring New Zealanders in 1986, where he captained the side, and against the touring Indian side in 1986, and the touring Pakistanis in 1987. Against the Pakistanis, he made an unbeaten half century. Price played List A one-day cricket for the Combined Universities cricket team in the 1986 Benson & Hedges Cup, making four appearances in the competition. In addition to playing first-class and List A cricket, he also played minor counties cricket for Hertfordshire from 1986–91, making eight appearances in the Minor Counties Championship and two appearances in the MCCA Knockout Trophy.

In 1988, he was appointed to teach at Melbourne Grammar School in Australia.

In 1991 he moved to Western Australia to teach Biology and to coach cricket at Scotch College in Perth.

He left teaching in 1995 to pursue a business career in Marketing and Advertising. He founded his own advertising and marketing agency in 1997.

In 2017 he retired from work due to illness.

He lives in Perth with his wife and family.
