= John Davidson (cricketer, born 1964) =

Welsh cricketer

Personal information
- Full name: John Edward Davidson
- Born: 23 October 1964 (age 62); Aberystwyth, Cardiganshire, Wales
- Batting: Right-handed
- Bowling: Right-arm fast-medium

Domestic team information
- Years: Team
- 1985–1987: Cambridge University

Career statistics
Competition	First-class	List A
Matches	15	7
Runs scored	144	14
Batting average	11.07	7.00
100s/50s	–/–	–/–
Top score	41*	11
Balls bowled	2,910	242
Wickets	40	4
Bowling average	38.15	45.00
5 wickets in innings	2	–
10 wickets in match	–	–
Best bowling	5/35	3/64
Catches/stumpings	5/–	–/–
- Source: Cricinfo, 31 August 2019

John Edward Davidson (born 23 October 1964) is a Welsh former cricketer.

Davidson was born at Aberystwyth in October 1964. He later studied at Trinity College, Cambridge. While studying at Cambridge, he made his debut in first-class cricket for Cambridge University against Surrey at Fenner's in 1985. He played first-class cricket for Cambridge until 1987, making fourteen appearances. Playing as a right-arm fast-medium bowler, he took 38 wickets at an average of 36.97 and best figures of 5 for 35. One of two five wicket hauls he took, these figures came against Hampshire in 1986. As a lower order batsman, he scored 139 runs at a batting average of 12.63, with best a high score of 41 not out. He also made a first-class appearance for a combined Oxford and Cambridge Universities cricket team against the touring New Zealanders in 1986. In addition to playing first-class cricket while at Cambridge, he also made seven List A one-day appearances for the Combined Universities cricket team in the 1986 and 1987 Benson & Hedges Cup's.
