= Alastair Scott (cricketer) =

English cricketer (born 1966)

Personal information
- Full name: Alastair Martin Gordon Scott
- Born: 31 March 1966 (age 60); Guildford, Surrey, England
- Batting: Right-handed
- Bowling: Left-arm medium
- Relatives: One wife and 3 kids

Domestic team information
- Years: Team
- 1986: Sussex
- 1985–1988: Cambridge University

Career statistics
Competition	First-class	List A
Matches	28	14
Runs scored	67	6
Batting average	4.18	6.00
100s/50s	–/–	–/–
Top score	11*	2*
Balls bowled	5,382	637
Wickets	72	8
Bowling average	39.19	52.25
5 wickets in innings	2	–
10 wickets in match	–	–
Best bowling	5/68	2/32
Catches/stumpings	10/–	1/–
- Source: Cricinfo, 22 July 2012

Alastair Martin Gordon Scott (born 31 March 1966) is a former English cricketer. Scott was a right-handed batsman who bowled left-arm medium pace. He was born in Guildford, Surrey.

While studying at the University of Cambridge, Scott made his first-class debut for Cambridge University against Essex at Fenner's. He made eight further first-class appearances for the university in that season, taking 25 wickets at an average of 35.16, with best figures of 5/68, which came against Nottinghamshire. He was selected to play in the Combined Universities team to play in the 1985 Benson & Hedges Cup, making his List A debut in the tournament against Surrey and making three further appearances in the competition. In 1986, he made seven first-class appearances for the university, taking 18 wickets at an average of 45.22, with best figures of 4/100. He also made a single first-class appearance each for a combined Oxford and Cambridge Universities team against the touring New Zealanders and for Sussex against Worcestershire in the County Championship. He also played in the 1986 Benson & Hedges Cup for the Combined Universities, making four appearances.

In 1987, he made seven first-class appearances for the university, taking 18 wickets at an average of 41.33, with best figures of 5/97, which came in The University Match at Lord's against Oxford University. In List A cricket, he made four appearances for the Combined Universities in the Benson & Hedges Cup. In his final year of studies in 1988, Scott made three first-class appearances, against Surrey, Essex and Middlesex, taking 11 wickets at an average of 35.00, with best figures of 4/66. He appeared in six List A matches for the Combined Universities in the 1988 Benson & Hedges Cup, playing his final match in that format against Essex. In total, he made 26 first-class appearances for the university, taking in his role as a bowler, 70 wickets at an average of 38.14. He was less successful in List A cricket for the Combined Universities, taking just 8 wickets in fourteen matches, which came at an average of 52.25, with best figures of 2/32. He gained a Blue in cricket during his time at Cambridge.
