= Kimpton =

Kimpton may refer to:

- Kimpton (surname)
- Kimpton, Hampshire, a village and civil parish in Hampshire, England
- Kimpton, Hertfordshire, a village in Hertfordshire, England
- Kimpton, Missouri, a ghost town
- Kimpton Hotels & Restaurants, an American hotel and restaurant company
- Kimpton Middle School, a school in Munroe Falls, Ohio, U.S.
