= Andrew Golding =

English cricketer (born 1963)

Personal information
- Full name: Andrew Kenneth Golding
- Born: 5 October 1963 (age 63); Colchester, Essex, England
- Batting: Right-handed
- Bowling: Slow left-arm orthodox

Domestic team information
- Years: Team
- 1997–1999: Northumberland
- 1990–1996: Suffolk
- 1984–1988: Cambridge University
- 1983: Essex

Career statistics
| Competition | First-class | List A |
|---|---|---|
| Matches | 17 | 8 |
| Runs scored | 403 | 57 |
| Batting average | 19.19 | 9.50 |
| 100s/50s | –/– | –/– |
| Top score | 47 | 31* |
| Balls bowled | 2,929 | 471 |
| Wickets | 18 | 6 |
| Bowling average | 91.50 | 48.66 |
| 5 wickets in innings | – | – |
| 10 wickets in match | – | – |
| Best bowling | 3/51 | 2/15 |
| Catches/stumpings | 6/– | 2/– |
- Source: Cricinfo, 26 July 2011

Andrew Kenneth Golding (born 5 October 1963) is a former English cricketer. Golding was a right-handed batsman who bowled slow left-arm orthodox. He was born in Colchester, Essex.

Golding made his only first-class appearance for Essex against the touring New Zealanders in 1983. In this match, he took the head of Ian Smith in the New Zealander's first-innings, for the cost of 44 runs from 14 overs. In their second-innings he dismissed the same batsman, this time conceding 53 runs from 14 overs. Following this match he played a Youth Test match for England Young Cricketers against Australia Young Cricketers. Golding later went on to study at Cambridge University, with him making his first-class debut for Cambridge University Cricket Club against Leicestershire in 1984. He made 14 further first-class appearances for the university, the last of which came against Middlesex in 1988. In his 15 first-class appearance for the university, he runs at an average of 17.94 mph, with a high score of 47. With the ball, he took 16 wickets at an expensive bowling average of 91.81, with best figures of 3/51. He also made an appearance for a combined Oxford and Cambridge Universities team against the touring New Zealanders in 1986. While at the university he made his List A for the Combined Universities against Hampshire in the 1986 Benson & Hedges Cup. He made 3 further List A appearances for the team, all of which came in that seasons Benson & Hedges Cup.

He joined Suffolk in 1990, making his debut for the county in that seasons Minor Counties Championship against Northumberland. He played Minor counties cricket for Suffolk from 1990 to 1996, making 54 Minor Counties Championship and 10 MCCA Knockout Trophy appearances. He made his first List A appearance for Suffolk against Worcestershire in the 1990 NatWest Trophy. He made 3 further List A appearances for the county, the last of which came against Somerset in the 1996 NatWest Trophy. In his 4 List A matches for Suffolk, he took 5 wickets at an average of 25.00, with best figures of 2/15. He later joined Northumberland, playing Minor counties cricket for the county from 1997 to 1999, making 16 Minor Counties Championship and 3 MCCA Knockout Trophy appearances.
