= Adrian Brown (cricketer) =

English cricketer (born 1962)

Personal information
- Full name: AdrianDesmondBrown
- Born: 18 May 1962 (age 64); Clacton-on-Sea, Essex, England
- Batting: Right-handed
- Role: Wicket-keeper

Domestic team information
- Years: Team
- 1989–1999: Suffolk
- 1988–1992: Essex
- 1986: Cambridge University
- 1985–1986: Suffolk

Career statistics
Competition	First-class	List A
Matches	14	16
Runs scored	99	92
Batting average	8.25	10.22
100s/50s	–/–	–/1
Top score	30	51
Balls bowled	–	–
Wickets	–	–
Bowling average	–	–
5 wickets in innings	–	–
10 wickets in match	–	–
Best bowling	–	–
Catches/stumpings	28/5	9/3
- Source: Cricinfo, 26 July 2011

Adrian Desmond Brown (born 18 May 1962) is a former English cricketer. Brown was a right-handed batsman who fielded as a wicket-keeper. He was born in Clacton-on-Sea, Essex.

Brown made his debut in county cricket for Suffolk in a List A match against Worcestershire in the 1984 NatWest Trophy. His early years in county cricket also saw him play Minor counties cricket for Suffolk, as well as a further List A appearance in the 1985 NatWest Trophy against Lancashire. In 1986 he began studying at Cambridge University, where he made his first-class debut against Leicestershire. He played first-class cricket only in 1986, making 8 appearances for the university. In his 8 first-class matches for the university, he scored 78 runs at an average of 9.75, with a high score of 30. Behind the stumps he took 15 catches and made 2 stumpings. He also played a first-class match for Oxford and Cambridge Universities against the touring New Zealanders in 1986. While at Cambridge, Brown played List A cricket for the Combined Universities, making 4 appearances for the team in the Benson & Hedges Cup.

Upon the conclusion of his studies, Brown joined Essex, making his first-class debut for the county against Yorkshire in the 1988 County Championship. In competition with David East for most of his time at Essex, he found his opportunities limited, making just 4 further first-class appearances, the last of which came against Nottinghamshire. In his 5 first-class appearances for Essex, he scored 13 runs at an average of 6.50, with a high score of 6 not out, while behind the stumps he took 13 catches and made 3 stumpings. While at Essex he also played List A cricket, making his debut in that format for the county against Yorkshire in the 1988 Refuge Assurance League. He made 2 further List A appearances for Essex in 1988, against Wiltshire in the NatWest Trophy and Hampshire in the Refuge Assurance League. While at Essex, with opportunities limited he appeared once more for Suffolk in Minor counties cricket from 1989 onwards, making a total of 92 Minor Counties Championship and 19 MCCA Knockout Trophy appearances for Suffolk up to his retirement at the end of the 1999 season. Indeed, while still at Essex he continued to play List A cricket for his native county, appearing in 3 List A matches while still playing for Essex. He would make a further 4 List A appearances for Suffolk, the last of which came against the Hampshire Cricket Board in the 1999 NatWest Trophy. In total, Brown played 8 List A matches for Suffolk, scoring 67 runs at an average of 9.57, with a high score of 51. This score came against Northamptonshire in the 1989 NatWest Trophy.
