= David Fell (cricketer) =

English cricketer

Personal information
- Full name: David John Fell
- Born: 25 October 1964 (age 62); Stafford, Staffordshire, England
- Batting: Right-handed
- Bowling: Leg break

Domestic team information
- Years: Team
- 1985–1987: Cambridge University

Career statistics
Competition	First-class	List A
Matches	27	8
Runs scored	974	112
Batting average	23.19	14.00
100s/50s	2/2	–/–
Top score	114	44
Balls bowled	0	8
Wickets	–	0
Bowling average	–	–
5 wickets in innings	–	–
10 wickets in match	–	–
Best bowling	–	–
Catches/stumpings	10/–	–/–
- Source: Cricinfo, 3 September 2019

David John Fell (born 27 October 1964) is an English former cricketer.

Fell was born at Stafford in May 1963, and was educated at the John Lyon School, before going up to Trinity College, Cambridge. While studying at Cambridge, he made his debut in first-class cricket for Cambridge University against Essex at Fenner's in 1985. He played first-class cricket for Cambridge until 1987, making 25 appearances. Playing as a batsman, he scored 963 runs at an average of 24.07 in his 25 matches for Cambridge, with a high score of 114. This score, which was one of two first-class centuries he made, came against Sussex, while his other first-class century, a score of 109 not out came against Nottinghamshire. He also made two first-class appearances for a combined Oxford and Cambridge Universities cricket team against the touring New Zealanders in 1986, and the touring Pakistanis in 1987. In addition to playing first-class cricket while at Cambridge, he also made eight List A one-day appearances for the Combined Universities cricket team, making four appearances apiece in the 1985 and 1986 Benson & Hedges Cup, scoring 112 runs with a high score of 44.
