= William Deacon =

William Deacon may refer to:

- William Deacon (politician) (1872–1943), member of the Queensland Legislative Assembly
- William Deacon (cricketer) (1828–1903), English cricketer and banker
- William Arthur Deacon (1890–1977), Canadian literary critic and editor
- William Frederick Deacon (1799–1845), English author and journalist
- Bill Deacon (1944–2019), New Zealand rugby league player
