= Alan Garofall =

English cricketer

Personal information
- Full name: Alan Robert Garofall
- Born: 1 June 1946 (age 80); Kingston-upon-Thames, Surrey, England
- Batting: Right-handed
- Bowling: Right-arm medium

Domestic team information
- Years: Team
- 1972–1974: Minor Counties South
- 1970–1997: Hertfordshire
- 1966–1968: Oxford University

Career statistics
| Competition | First-class | List A |
|---|---|---|
| Matches | 27 | 21 |
| Runs scored | 874 | 158 |
| Batting average | 18.59 | 8.31 |
| 100s/50s | –/4 | –/– |
| Top score | 99 | 38 |
| Balls bowled | 4 | 829 |
| Wickets | – | 19 |
| Bowling average | – | 28.00 |
| 5 wickets in innings | – | – |
| 10 wickets in match | – | – |
| Best bowling | – | 3/28 |
| Catches/stumpings | 19/– | 7/– |
- Source: Cricinfo, 5 September 2011

Alan Robert Garofall (born 1 June 1946) is a former English cricketer. Garofall was a right-handed batsman who bowled right-arm medium pace.

Garofall was born in Kingston-upon-Thames, Surrey. After attending Latymer Upper School in London, he went up to St Edmund Hall, Oxford. He made his first-class debut for Oxford University against Middlesex in 1966. He made 26 further first-class appearances for the university, the last of which came against Cambridge University in 1968. In first-class matches he scored 843 runs at an average of 18.73, with a high score of 99 against Warwickshire in 1967. He also played a match for a combined Oxford and Cambridge Universities team against the touring Australians in 1968. As well as getting an Oxford Blue in cricket, he also got one in football.

Garofall made his debut for Hertfordshire in the 1970 Minor Counties Championship against Bedfordshire. He played Minor counties cricket for Hertfordshire from 1970 to 1997, making 166 appearances and 17 MCCA Knockout Trophy appearances. He made his List A debut against Surrey in the 1971 Gillette Cup. He made eleven further List A appearances for the county, the last of which came against Nottinghamshire in the 1989 NatWest Trophy. In his twelve List A matches, he scored 67 runs at an average of 6.70, with a high score of 26. With the ball, he took 12 wickets at a bowling average of 27.08, with best figures of 3/28.

He also played List A cricket for Minor Counties South, first appearing for the team in the 1972 Benson & Hedges Cup against Somerset. He made eight further List A appearances for the team, the last of which came against Somerset in the 1974 Benson & Hedges Cup. He scored 91 runs at an average of 10.11, with a high score of 38, and took six wickets at an average of 29.83, with best figures of 3/71.
