= Richard Rutnagur =

Indian-born English cricketer

Personal information
- Full name: Richard Sohrab Rutnagur
- Born: 9 August 1964 (age 62); Bombay, Maharashtra, India
- Batting: Left-handed
- Bowling: Right-arm medium

Domestic team information
- Years: Team
- 1985–1986: Oxford University

Career statistics
Competition	First-class	List A
Matches	17	4
Runs scored	334	41
Batting average	15.18	13.66
100s/50s	–/2	–/–
Top score	66	32
Balls bowled	2,118	96
Wickets	29	3
Bowling average	43.31	13.00
5 wickets in innings	1	–
10 wickets in match	–	–
Best bowling	–	2/31
Catches/stumpings	5/–	–/–
- Source: Cricinfo, 1 September 2019

Richard Sohrab Rutnagur (born 6 August 1964) is an Indian-born English former cricketer.

The son of the Indian journalist Dicky Rutnagur, he was born at Bombay in August 1964. Two years later he moved to England when his father emigrated to work alongside E. W. Swanton at The Daily Telegraph. He was educated at Westminster School, before going up to New College, Oxford. While studying at Oxford, he made his debut in first-class cricket for Oxford University against Somerset at Oxford in 1985. He played first-class cricket for Oxford until 1986, making sixteen appearances. Playing as an all-rounder, he scored 302 runs for Oxford at an average of 15.10 and a high score of 66, one of two half centuries he made. With his right-arm medium pace bowling, he took 29 wickets at a bowling average of 40.24, with best figures of 5 for 112. He also made a single first-class appearance for a combined Oxford and Cambridge Universities cricket team against the touring New Zealanders in 1986. In addition to playing first-class cricket while at Oxford, he also made four List A one-day appearances for the Combined Universities cricket team in the 1986 Benson & Hedges Cup. He gained a cricket blue while at Oxford.
