= Avison Scott =

English cricketer

Avison Terry Scott
- Archdeacon of Tonbridge
- Church: Church of England
- Diocese: Diocese of Canterbury
- In office: 1906–1925
- Predecessor: Inaugural incumbent
- Successor: Leonard Savill
- Other posts: Vicar of Tunbridge Wells; 1886–1925

Orders
- Ordination: 1871 (deacon); 1872 (priest)

Personal details
- Born: 18 July 1848 Cambridge, England, England
- Died: 18 June 1925 (aged 76) Marylebone, London, England
- Denomination: Anglican
- Residence: Tunbridge Wells
- Parents: John Scott and Charlotte Anne, née Terry
- Spouse: Dora née Tillard
- Children: 5s; 2d
- Education: Trinity College, Cambridge

Reverend Avison Terry Scott (18 July 1848 – 18 June 1925) was an English first-class cricketer active from 1867 to 1871, and who played for Cambridge Town Club (aka Cambridgeshire) and Cambridge University. He was born in Cambridge and died in Marylebone aged 76 years and 335 days. He later became an Anglican priest.

== Family ==
=== Notable relatives ===
Scott was a descendant of the commentator Thomas Scott; nephew of Sir George Gilbert Scott; first cousin of George Gilbert Scott Jr.; uncle of Elliot Dowell Tillard; first cousin once removed of Giles Gilbert Scott; and father of George Arbuthnot Scott.

=== Own immediate relatives ===
Scott was the son of Canon John Scott, Vicar of Wisbech, the brother of the architect George Gilbert Scott. In 1874 he married Dora (Dorothea Sarah), daughter of The Rev. Richard Tillard, Rector of Blakeney, Norfolk. As well as their middle child, the cricketer George, they had three older (John Wilfrid; Amy Florence; and Charles Tillard) and three younger children (Arthur Avison; Walter Leonard; Anna Dorothea).

== Education ==
Scott was educated at Brighton College and Trinity College, Cambridge.

== Ecclesiastical career ==
After serving curacies at Swaffham and Wimbledon he became the incumbent at Christ Church, Bootle in 1879. In 1886, he was appointed Vicar of St James, Tunbridge Wells. In 1895 he additionally took on the responsibility of chaplain to the Tonbridge Union Workhouse In 1906 the Bishop of Rochester obtained an Order in Council to create an Archdeaconry of Tonbridge and nominated Scott to be the first incumbent.
