= Chilton Taylor =

English cricketer (born 1951)

Chilton Richard Vernon Taylor (born 3 October 1951) is a former English cricketer active from 1970 to 1981 who played for Warwickshire, Middlesex, Cambridge University, the combined Oxford and Cambridge Universities cricket team and Cheshire. He was born in Birkenhead. He appeared in 33 first-class matches as a righthanded batsman and wicketkeeper. He scored 276 runs with a highest score of 25. He held 56 catches and completed nine stumpings.
