= Kimpton (surname) =

Kimpton is a surname. Notable people with the surname include:

- Gwynne Kimpton (1873-1930), conductor, founder of the British Women's Symphony Orchestra
- Lawrence A. Kimpton (1910–1977), American philosopher and educator
- Nick Kimpton (born 1983), Australian baseball player
- Robert Kimpton (1914–2007), Australian cricketer
- Roger Kimpton (1916–1999), Australian cricketer
- Sid Kimpton (1887–1968), English footballer and manager
- Stephen Kimpton (1914–1997), Australian cricketer
