= List of Oxford cricketers =

List of Oxford cricketers may refer to:

- List of Oxford University Cricket Club players
- List of Oxford UCCE & MCCU players
- List of Oxford and Cambridge Universities cricket team players
- List of Oxfordshire County Cricket Club List A players
