= Timothy Taylor (cricketer) =

English cricketer (born 1961)

Personal information
- Full name: Timothy John Taylor
- Born: 28 March 1961 (age 65); Romiley, Cheshire, England
- Batting: Right-handed
- Bowling: Slow left-arm orthodox

Domestic team information
- Years: Team
- 1981–1982: Lancashire
- 1981: Minor Counties
- 1981–1982: Oxford University
- 1980–1982: Cheshire

Career statistics
| Competition | First-class | List A |
|---|---|---|
| Matches | 14 | 1 |
| Runs scored | 115 | 1 |
| Batting average | 11.50 | 1.00 |
| 100s/50s | –/– | –/– |
| Top score | 28* | 1 |
| Balls bowled | 2,977 | 60 |
| Wickets | 37 | 1 |
| Bowling average | 34.37 | 28.00 |
| 5 wickets in innings | 2 | – |
| 10 wickets in match | – | – |
| Best bowling | 5/81 | 1/28 |
| Catches/stumpings | 2/– | –/– |
- Source: Cricinfo, 11 August 2011

Timothy John Taylor (born 28 March 1961) is a former English cricketer. Taylor was a right-handed batsman who bowled slow left-arm orthodox. He was born in Romiley, Cheshire.

Taylor made his debut in county cricket for Cheshire in the 1980 Minor Counties Championship against Durham. He began studies at Magdalen College, Oxford, in 1979, and in 1981 made his first-class debut for Oxford University Cricket Club against Leicestershire. He made 7 further first-class appearances for the university, the last of which came in the 1981 University Match against Cambridge University. In his 7 first-class matches for the university, he took 24 wickets at an average of 35.91, with best figures of 5/81. These figures, one of two five wicket hauls he took for Oxford, came against Middlesex in 1981. While attending the university, he played for a combined Oxford and Cambridge Universities team against the touring Sri Lankans in 1981. He played a further two first-class matches in that season against the Sri Lankans, one for the Minor Counties and another for Lancashire. He made two further first-class appearances in 1981 for Lancashire, both in the County Championship against Leicestershire and Derbyshire.

He continued to play Minor counties cricket for Cheshire at this time, making his lone List A appearance for the county against Hampshire in the NatWest Trophy. In a match which Hampshire won by 6 wickets, Taylor took the wicket of Trevor Jesty, while with the bat he was dismissed for a single run by Steve Malone. As well as playing his final matches for Oxford University in 1982, he also played his final first-class match for Lancashire, which came in a County Championship match against Kent. In 4 first-class appearances for Lancashire, he took 4 wickets at an average of 47.60, with best figures of 2/63. 1982 also saw Taylor make his final Minor counties appearance for Cheshire, having made 16 Minor Counties Championship appearances.
