= Graham Pointer =

English cricketer

Personal information
- Full name: Graham Alan Pointer
- Born: 2 May 1967 (age 59); Lewisham, Kent, England
- Batting: Right-handed
- Bowling: Left-arm medium-fast

Domestic team information
- Years: Team
- 1987–1990: Cambridge University

Career statistics
Competition	First-class
Matches	16
Runs scored	234
Batting average	11.70
100s/50s	–/–
Top score	33
Balls bowled	2,267
Wickets	17
Bowling average	76.35
5 wickets in innings	–
10 wickets in match	–
Best bowling	3/35
Catches/stumpings	1/–
- Source: Cricinfo, 11 August 2020

Graham Alan Pointer (born 2 May 1967) is an English former first-class cricketer.

Pointer was born at Lewisham in May 1967. He was educated at St Dunstan's College, before going up to St John's College, Cambridge. While studying at Cambridge, he played first-class cricket for Cambridge University, making his debut against Essex in 1987. He played first-class cricket for Cambridge until 1990, making fifteen appearances. Playing primarily as a left-arm medium-fast bowler, he took 17 wickets in his fifteen matches for Cambridge, at an average of 74.88 and with best figures of 3 for 31. As a tailend batsman, he scored 231 runs at a batting average of 12.15 and with a high score of 33. In addition to playing first-class cricket for Cambridge, Pointer also made a single appearance for a combined Oxford and Cambridge Universities cricket team against the touring Pakistanis at Oxford in 1987.
