= Richard Smyth (cricketer, born 1951) =

English cricketer and school headmaster

Personal information
- Full name: Richard Ian Smyth
- Born: 19 November 1951 (age 74); Bishopwearmouth, County Durham, England
- Batting: Right-handed
- Bowling: Leg break
- Role: Occasional wicket-keeper

Domestic team information
- Years: Team
- 1974: Durham
- 1973–1975: Cambridge University

Career statistics
| Competition | First-class | List A |
|---|---|---|
| Matches | 21 | 4 |
| Runs scored | 711 | 39 |
| Batting average | 18.23 | 9.75 |
| 100s/50s | –/3 | –/– |
| Top score | 61 | 21 |
| Balls bowled | – | – |
| Wickets | – | – |
| Bowling average | – | – |
| 5 wickets in innings | – | – |
| 10 wickets in match | – | – |
| Best bowling | – | – |
| Catches/stumpings | 4/– | –/– |
- Source: Cricinfo, 31 December 2011

Richard Ian Smyth (born 19 November 1951) is an English school headmaster and cricketer.

== Early life ==
Smyth was born at Bishopwearmouth, County Durham, and educated at Sedbergh School and Emmanuel College, Cambridge, where he gained a BA degree and PGCE.

== Cricket ==
Smyth was a right-handed batsman who bowled leg break, and who occasionally fielded as a wicket-keeper. While studying at the University of Cambridge, he made his first-class cricket debut for Cambridge University against Warwickshire in 1973. He made nineteen further first-class appearances for the university, the last of which came against Oxford University in the 1975 The University Match at Lord's. In his twenty first-class appearances for Oxford University, he scored a total of 679 runs at an average of 18.35, with a high score of 61. This score was one of three fifties he made and came against Yorkshire in 1974. He also made a single first-class appearance for a combined Oxford and Cambridge Universities side against the touring Indians in 1974. Cambridge University took part in the 1974 Benson & Hedges Cup, with Smyth making his List A debut in that tournament against Kent. He played three further List A matches during that competition, against Essex, Surrey and Sussex. In his four List A matches, Smyth scored a total of 39 runs at an average of 9.75, with a high score of 21.

He played a single Minor Counties Championship match for his native Durham against Shropshire in 1974.

== Teaching ==
Smyth was an assistant master at Christ's Hospital and at Gresham's School, a housemaster at Wellington College, headmaster of King's School, Bruton, 1993–2004 and of St Peter's School, York 2004–09, and Principal of Fulwood Academy 2010–14.
