= Owen Hughes (cricketer) =

English cricketer (1889–1972)

Owen Hughes DFC
- Born: 7 July 1889; Reigate, Surrey, England
- Died: 4 June 1972 (aged 82); Saint Peter, Jersey
- Education: Malvern College
- Alma mater: Clare College, Cambridge
- Spouse: Eileen Armstrong Chauntrell (m. 1915)
- Cricket career

Cricket information
- Batting: Right-handed
- Role: Wicket-keeper

Domestic team information
- Years: Team
- 1910: Cambridge University

Career statistics
| Competition | First-class |
|---|---|
| Matches | 6 |
| Runs scored | 168 |
| Batting average | 21.00 |
| 100s/50s | 0/2 |
| Top score | 65 |
| Catches/stumpings | 7/– |
- Source: Cricinfo, 7 August 2020
- Military career
- Allegiance: United Kingdom
- Branch: British Army; Royal Flying Corps
- Service years: 1915-1919
- Rank: Captain
- Unit: Worcestershire Regiment
- Conflicts: World War I
- Awards: DFC

Owen Hughes DFC (7 July 1889 – 4 June 1972) was an English first-class cricketer and an officer in both the British Army and the Royal Flying Corps.

The son of F. Hughes, he was born at Reigate in July 1889. He was educated at Malvern College, before going up to Clare College, Cambridge. While studying at Cambridge, he played first-class cricket for Cambridge University in 1910, making five appearances. In his five first-class matches for Cambridge, he scored 155 runs at an average of 25.83, making two half centuries and a high score of 65. In addition to playing for Cambridge in 1910, he also made a single first-class appearance for a combined Oxford and Cambridge Universities cricket team against a combined Army and Navy cricket team at Aldershot.

When the First World War began, Hughes was in Singapore. He returned to Plymouth aboard the SS Malawa in January 1915, being commissioned shortly after in the Worcestershire Regiment as a second lieutenant. However, he did not see action with the regiment as he instead undertook flight training at Farnborough flying a Farman MF.11. After completing his flight training, he transferred to the Royal Flying Corps in September 1915. He initially joined No. 21 Squadron at Hounslow, before being posted to the newly formed No. 31 Squadron at Farnborough in October 1915. He accompanied the squadron to British India for operational duties at Risalpur in the North-West Frontier Province.

He was promoted to captain in February 1917, before being awarded the Distinguished Flying Cross in the 1919 Birthday Honours for services rendered during the war. Hughes was demobilised at Bombay following the war in March 1919 and set sail from there for Singapore. He was married to Eileen Armstrong Chauntrell in September 1915, with the couple having one son. They later moved to Saint Peter in Jersey, where he died in June 1972, at the age of 82 and shortly before his 83rd birthday.
