= Keith Jones (cricketer, born 1951) =

English cricketer

Personal information
- Full name: Alan Keith Colin Jones
- Born: 20 April 1951 (age 75); Solihull, Warwickshire, England
- Batting: Right-handed
- Bowling: Right-arm medium

Domestic team information
- Years: Team
- 1971–1973: Oxford University
- 1969–1973: Warwickshire

Career statistics
Competition	First-class	List A
Matches	35	7
Runs scored	1,403	181
Batting average	21.92	30.16
100s/50s	1/5	–/1
Top score	111	82
Balls bowled	9	–
Wickets	–	–
Bowling average	–	–
5 wickets in innings	–	–
10 wickets in match	–	–
Best bowling	–	–
Catches/stumpings	13/–	1/–
- Source: Cricinfo, 13 July 2012

Alan Keith Colin Jones (born 20 April 1951) is an English former cricketer. Jones was a right-handed batsman who bowled right-arm medium pace. He was born at Solihull, Warwickshire, and was educated at Solihull School and St Edmund Hall, Oxford.

Keith Jones made his first-class debut for Warwickshire against Scotland at Edgbaston in 1969. His next first-class appearance came during his university studies for Oxford University against Warwickshire. He made 28 further first-class appearances for the university, the last of which came in The University Match of 1973 against Cambridge University at Lord's. In his 29 first-class appearances for the university, Jones scored 1,102 runs at an average of 21.19, with a highest score of 111 against Nottinghamshire in 1971. He also made two first-class appearances for a combined Oxford and Cambridge Universities team, against the touring Australians in 1972 and the touring New Zealanders in 1973. It was for Oxford University that he also made his List A debut for in the 1973 Benson & Hedges Cup against Leicestershire. He made three further appearances in that season's competition, against Warwickshire, Northamptonshire and Worcestershire. He scored a total of 153 runs in these matches, at an average of 38.25 and with a high score of 82, which came against Northamptonshire.

Following the end of his studies in 1973, Jones returned to Warwickshire, where he played a half a dozen matches for the county at the end of the 1973 season. He made three first-class appearances in the County Championship against Kent, Middlesex and Gloucestershire, as well as making three List A appearances in the John Player League against Surrey, Worcestershire and Gloucestershire.
