= Dave Woodhead (cricketer) =

English cricketer

Personal information
- Full name: David Leonard Woodhead
- Born: 17 March 1940 (age 86); Moseley, Warwickshire, England
- Batting: Right-handed
- Bowling: Leg break

Domestic team information
- Years: Team
- 1968: Cambridge University

Career statistics
Competition	First-class
Matches	8
Runs scored	190
Batting average	13.57
100s/50s	–/1
Top score	68
Balls bowled	246
Wickets	0
Bowling average	–
5 wickets in innings	–
10 wickets in match	–
Best bowling	–
Catches/stumpings	2/–
- Source: Cricinfo, 12 August 2020

David Leonard Woodhead (born 17 March 1940) is an English former first-class cricketer.

Woodhead was born at Moseley in March 1940. He later studied at Fitzwilliam College at the University of Cambridge. While studying at Cambridge, he played first-class cricket for Cambridge University in 1968, making seven appearances. He scored 168 runs in his seven matches, at an average of 15.50 and with a high score of 68. He also bowled 41 overs of leg spin, but did not take any wickets. In addition to playing first-class cricket for Cambridge, Woodhead also made a single appearance for a combined Oxford and Cambridge Universities cricket team against the touring Australians at Fenner's in 1968.
