= List of cricket grounds in Namibia =

This is a list of cricket grounds in Namibia. The grounds included in this list have held first-class, List-A and Twenty20 matches.

Official name (known as)	City or town	Capacity	Ends/notes	Ref
Affies Park	Windhoek			
Defence Force Ground	Windhoek			
Trans Namib Ground	Windhoek			
United Ground, Windhoek	Windhoek		hosted T20I matches	
Wanderers Cricket Ground	Windhoek		Has held ODI & T20I matches	
Windhoek High School	Windhoek		Has held ten Twenty20 matches	
