= Graeme Turner (cricketer) =

Rhodesian-born South African cricketer

Personal information
- Full name: Graeme John Turner
- Born: 5 August 1964 (age 62); Bulawayo, Southern Rhodesia
- Batting: Left-handed
- Bowling: Right-arm off break

Domestic team information
- Years: Team
- 1984/85–1986/87: Western Province B
- 1984/85–1986/87: Western Province
- 1986/87–1987/88: Northern Transvaal B
- 1990–1991: Oxford University
- 1992/93: Transvaal

Career statistics
Competition	First-class	List A
Matches	44	7
Runs scored	1,791	211
Batting average	24.50	52.75
100s/50s	1/10	–/2
Top score	101*	80*
Balls bowled	2,605	184
Wickets	27	3
Bowling average	57.00	40.00
5 wickets in innings	–	–
10 wickets in match	–	–
Best bowling	4/94	2/18
Catches/stumpings	26/–	1/–
- Source: Cricinfo, 7 September 2019

Graeme John Turner (born 5 August 1964) is a Rhodesian-born South African former cricketer.

Turner was born in August 1964 at Bulawayo, Southern Rhodesia, later moving to South Africa to study at university. He made his debut in first-class cricket for Western Province B against Boland in the 1984–85 Castle Bowl. His second first-class match, played in December 1984, came for the combined South African Universities against Transvaal. He played first-class cricket for Western Province and their B team until the 1986–87 season, making sixteen appearances. He scored 678 runs in these matches, at an average of 24.21 and a high score of 69 not out. It was for Western Province that he made his debut in List A one-day cricket in the 1984–85 Benson and Hedges Series against Transvaal, with Turner making two further List A appearances for Western Province in the 1986–87 Nissan Shield. Toward the end of the 1986–87 Castle Bowl, Turner moved to Northern Transvaal B, where he represented the team in seven first-class matches until January 1988. He scored 259 runs in these matches, at an average of 21.58 and a high score of 58. He made a first-class appearance for the South African Defence Force cricket team against Natal in December 1988, while conscripted in the South African Defence Force.

He travelled to England in 1989 to study at the University of Oxford, where he attended St Anne's College. While studying at Oxford, he made sixteen first-class appearances for Oxford University in 1990–91, scoring 607 runs at an average of 38.93. He made his only first-class century while playing for Oxford, scoring 101 not out against Lancashire in 1991. With his right-arm off break bowling, he took 19 wickets for Oxford with best figures of 3 for 32. He also made a single first-class appearance for the combined Oxford and Cambridge Universities cricket team against the touring New Zealanders in 1900, where he featured alongside fellow South African and St Anne's College attendee Willem van der Merwe. In addition to playing first-class cricket while at Oxford, he also appeared in three List A matches for the Combined Universities cricket team in the 1991 Benson & Hedges Cup. Returning to South Africa, he later made two first-class appearances for Transvaal in the 1993–93 Castle Cup.
