= Michael Kaye =

English cricketer and British Army officer

Personal information
- Full name: Michael Arthur Chadwick Porter Kaye
- Born: 11 January 1916; Kensington, London, England
- Died: 22 September 1998 (aged 82); Charing Cross, London, England
- Batting: Right-handed
- Bowling: Right-arm medium-fast

Domestic team information
- Years: Team
- 1937–1938: Cambridge University

Career statistics
Competition	First-class
Matches	17
Runs scored	395
Batting average	17.95
100s/50s	–/2
Top score	78
Balls bowled	2,175
Wickets	31
Bowling average	40.12
5 wickets in innings	1
10 wickets in match	–
Best bowling	5/89
Catches/stumpings	11/–
- Source: Cricinfo, 3 June 2019

Michael Arthur Chadwick Porter Kaye TD DL (11 January 1916 – 22 September 1988) was an English first-class cricketer and British Army officer. Kaye played first-class cricket predominantly for Cambridge University and the Free Foresters between 1937 and 1949. He also served in the British Army with the King's Own Yorkshire Light Infantry, seeing action in the Second World War. He later served as a deputy lieutenant for the West Riding of Yorkshire.

== Early life and university cricket ==
Kaye was born at Kensington in January 1916 and was educated at Harrow School, where he was a part of the Harrow School contingent of the Officers' Training Corps. After leaving Harrow he enlisted in the King's Own Yorkshire Light Infantry as a second lieutenant in July 1935, before going up to Pembroke College, Cambridge. While studying at Cambridge he made his debut in first-class cricket for Cambridge University against the touring New Zealanders at Fenner's in 1937. His only other first-class appearance in 1937 came for the Free Foresters against Cambridge University. He appeared in eight first-class matches for the university in 1938, before touring Jamaica with a combined Oxford and Cambridge Universities team in August 1938, playing two first-class matches against Jamaica at Kingston. In nine first-class matches for Cambridge, he scored 244 runs with a high score of 78, while with his right-arm medium-fast bowling he took 26 wickets at an average of 34.50, with best figures of 5 for 89 against the Marylebone Cricket Club in 1938, which saw him dismissed Denis Compton for a duck. He gained a blue in 1938, and after graduating from Pembroke in the same year, he made a further first-class appearance for the Free Foresters against Cambridge University in 1939. He was also promoted to the rank of lieutenant in July 1938.

== Later military career and life ==
Kaye served with the King's Own Yorkshire Light Infantry during the Second World War, holding the war substantive rank of captain by its conclusion. He resumed playing first-class cricket for the Free Foresters after the war, making four further appearances against Cambridge University between 1946 and 1949. In six matches for the Free Foresters, he scored 127 runs and took 4 wickets. He was promoted to the rank of lieutenant colonel in May 1947. He was awarded the Territorial Decoration in February 1949, while in March 1955 he was appointed as an honorary colonel of a Territorial Army unit. Kaye resigned his commission in April 1959. He was appointed as a deputy lieutenant for the West Riding of Yorkshire in June 1960. He died at Charing Cross in September 1998.
