= Timothy Murrills =

English cricketer

Personal information
- Full name: Timothy James Murrills
- Born: 22 November 1953 (age 72); Ecclesall, Yorkshire, England
- Batting: Right-handed
- Bowling: Right-arm medium
- Role: Wicket-keeper

Domestic team information
- Years: Team
- 1979: Minor Counties South
- 1974–1981: Dorset
- 1973–1976: Cambridge University

Career statistics
Competition	First-class
Matches	37
Runs scored	996
Batting average	15.32
100s/50s	–/3
Top score	67
Balls bowled	6
Wickets	–
Bowling average	–
5 wickets in innings	–
10 wickets in match	–
Best bowling	–
Catches/stumpings	18/–
- Source: Cricinfo, 8 November 2011

Timothy James Murrills (born 22 December 1953) is a former English cricketer. Murrills was a right-handed batsman who bowled right-arm medium pace and who also kept wicket. He was born at Ecclesall, Yorkshire.

Murrills made his first-class debut for Cambridge University against Warwickshire. He made 34 further first-class appearances for Cambridge, the last of which came against Oxford University in 1976. In his 35 appearances for the university, he scored 900 runs at an average of 14.75, with a high score of 67. This score, which was one of three fifties he made, came against Surrey in 1976. He also appeared twice in first-class cricket for a combined Oxford and Cambridge Universities team, in 1974 against the touring Indians and in 1976 against the touring West Indians. His debut in List A cricket came for Cambridge University in the 1974 Benson and Hedges Cup against Kent, with him making three appearances in that season's competition. In the 1976 Benson and Hedges Cup he made four appearances for the Combined Universities.

Murrills first appeared for Dorset in the 1974 Minor Counties Championship against Cornwall. He played Minor counties cricket for Dorset from 1974 to 1981, making 25 Minor Counties Championship appearances. In 1979, he made a single List A appearance for Minor Counties South against Gloucestershire in the Benson and Hedges Cup. scoring 27 runs before being dismissed by Mike Procter, with Gloucestershire winning by 8 wickets.
