= Philip Carling =

English cricketer

Personal information
- Full name: Philip George Carling
- Born: 25 November 1946; Carshalton, Surrey, England
- Died: 12 November 2023 (aged 76); Penarth, Glamorgan, Wales
- Batting: Left-handed
- Role: Opening batter, occasional wicketkeeper

Domestic team information
- Years: Team
- 1967–1970: Cambridge University
- 1972: Cambridgeshire

Career statistics
Competition	First-class
Matches	30
Runs scored	1,160
Batting average	22.30
100s/50s	1/3
Top score	104
Balls bowled	33
Wickets	0
Bowling average	–
5 wickets in innings	0
10 wickets in match	0
Best bowling	0/0
Catches/stumpings	13/–
- Source: Cricinfo, 16 July 2023

Philip George Carling (25 November 1946 — 12 November 2023) was an English cricketer and cricket administrator. He played 30 first-class matches for Cambridge University Cricket Club between 1967 and 1970.

Carling's best season as a left-handed opening batter was his last, the 1970 Cambridge University season, when he, Majid Khan and Roger Knight were singled out by Wisden Cricketers' Almanack as "the strength of the side". Carling's only first-class century, an innings of 104, came that season and a second-wicket partnership of 225 with Majid led Cambridge to an eight-wicket win against a strong Glamorgan side, the university team's first victory over a county side since 1963. In the 1970 University Match against Oxford, Carling's last first-class game, he and Majid put on 168 for the second wicket, but Carling's share was just 44 and Majid went on to score 200 in a match truncated by a final day lost to rain. In addition to his blue for cricket in 1970, Carling had also won a cricket blue in 1968 and was awarded a blue in field hockey. Before and during his time at Cambridge University, Carling also played cricket for Surrey's second eleven and in 1972 he made a single appearance in a Minor Counties Championship match for Cambridgeshire.

Carling worked as a sports administrator, acting as secretary (chief executive) to Nottinghamshire County Cricket Club before taking a similar role at Glamorgan. In 2004 he was appointed chairman of the Sports Council for Wales.

== See also ==
- List of Cambridge University Cricket Club players
