= Julie Conalty =

British Anglican bishop

The Right Reverend Julie Conalty
- Bishop of Birkenhead
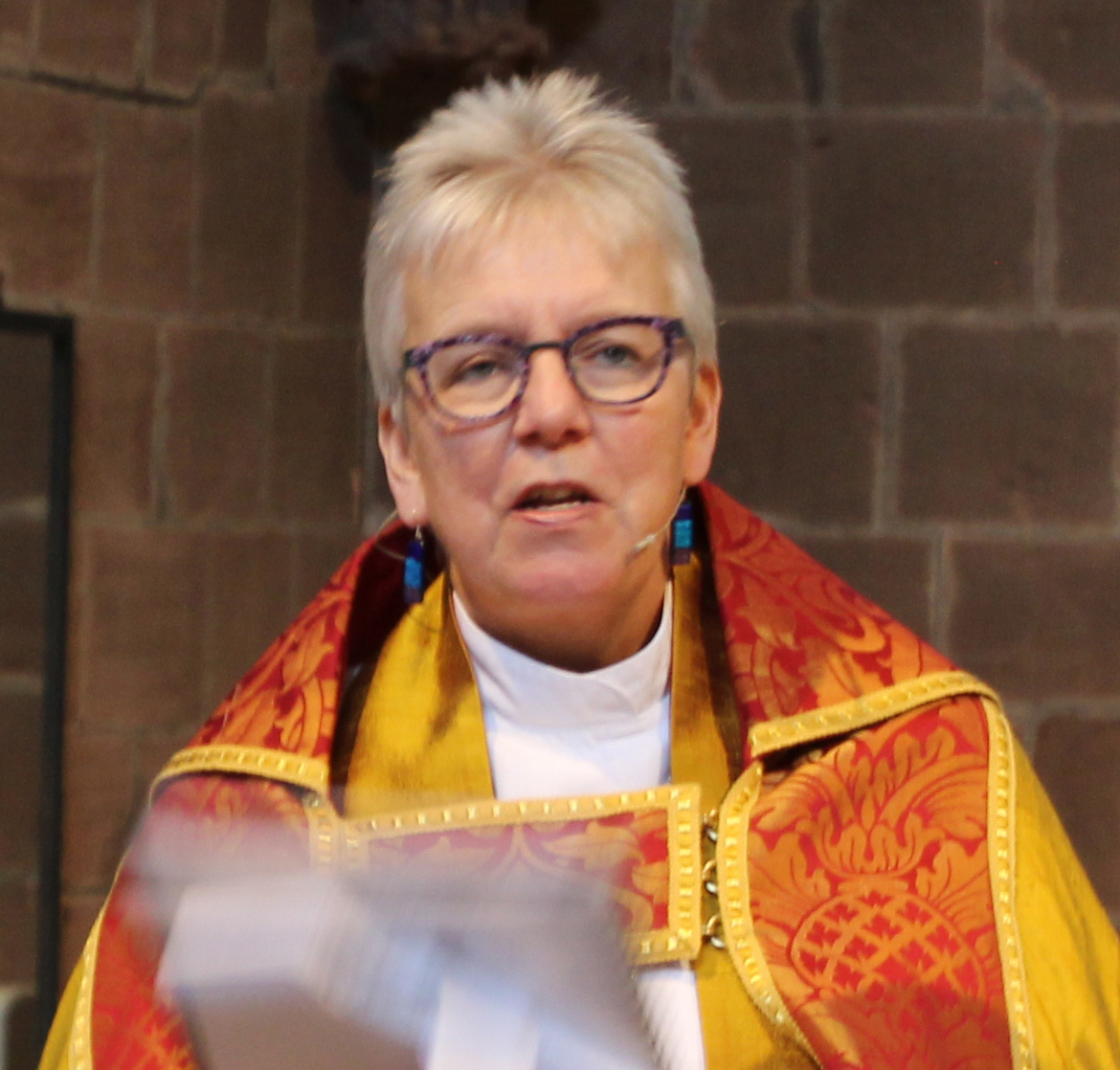
- Conalty in 2022
- Diocese: Diocese of Chester
- In office: 2021 to present
- Predecessor: Keith Sinclair
- Other post: Deputy lead bishop for safeguarding (2022–present)
- Previous post: Archdeacon of Tonbridge (2017–2021)

Orders
- Ordination: 1999 (deacon); 2000 (priest)
- Consecration: 19 July 2021 by Stephen Cottrell

Personal details
- Born: 1963 (age 62–63)
- Denomination: Anglicanism
- Spouse: Simon Malcolm
- Children: 2

Julie Anne Conalty (born 1963) is a British Anglican bishop. Since 19 July 2021, she has been the Bishop of Birkenhead, one of two suffragan bishops of the Church of England Diocese of Chester. She previously served as Archdeacon of Tonbridge in the Diocese of Rochester since 2017.

Conalty trained for the ministry at the South East Institute for Theological Education; she was ordained deacon in 1999, and priest in 2000. She was at East Wickham from 1999 to 2004; and Charlton to 2010. After a curacy at Plumstead Common she was Vicar of Erith from 2012 until her appointment as Archdeacon.

== Early life and education ==
Conalty was born in 1963. She was educated at Ormskirk Grammar School in Ormskirk, Lancashire: it was a grammar school which became a comprehensive school while she was there. She attended Cottage Lane Mission church and was a member of the youth group, before taking a Biblical Studies degree at the University of Sheffield. Although she felt called to ordained ministry as a teenager, women could not become priests in the Church of England at that time.

After leaving university, Conalty first worked with the homeless as a night shelter manager between 1985 and 1986. She then moved into offender management, first as a community service officer (1986 to 1988), and then as a probation officer (1990 to 2002). In between, she trained as a social worker. In the 1990s, she finally trained for ordination on a part-time basis with the South East Institute of Theological Education.

== Ordained ministry ==
Conalty was ordained in the Church of England as a deacon in 1999 and as a priest in 2000. She began her ecclesiastical career as a non-stipendiary minister (ie, part-time and unpaid) in the Diocese of Southwark, while continuing to work in probation and youth services. She first served at St Michael the Archangel, East Wickham from 1999 to 2004, and then at St Luke with Holy Trinity, Charlton from 2004 to 2010.

In 2010, Conalty left her secular career and moved into full-time ministry, becoming associate priest of the Plumstead Common United Benefice. In 2012, she moved to the Diocese of Rochester where she had been appointed Vicar of Christ Church, Erith. She was additionally Bishop's Advisor for the Ministry of Ordained Women (2013 to 2017) and Area Dean of Erith (2014 to 2017). In 2016, she was made an Honorary Canon of Rochester Cathedral. On 24 September 2017, she was collated as Archdeacon of Tonbridge. She was also the Bishop of Rochester's Lead for Safeguarding.

Conalty has been a member of the General Synod of the Church of England since November 2013.

=== Episcopal ministry ===
On 27 May 2021, it was announced that Conalty would be the next Bishop of Birkenhead, a suffragan bishop in the Diocese of Chester. She legally took up the post on 19 July 2021, the day of her consecration as a bishop by Stephen Cottrell, Archbishop of York, at York Minster; she was consecrated alongside the other suffragan of the diocese, Sam Corley, Bishop of Stockport.

Since April 2022, she has also been deputy lead bishop for safeguarding with a focus on survivor engagement.

=== Views ===
In 2023, she was one of 44 Church of England bishops who signed an open letter supporting the use of the Prayers of Love and Faith (i.e. blessings for same-sex couples) and called for "Guidance being issued without delay that includes the removal of all restrictions on clergy entering same-sex civil marriages, and on bishops ordaining and licensing such clergy".

Conalty favours the disestablishment of the Church of England.

== Personal life ==
Conalty is married to Simon Malcolm, and they have two sons. The Conalty family support South London club Charlton Athletic.

Church of England titles
Preceded by Clive Mansell	Archdeacon of Tonbridge; 2017 – 2021	TBA
Preceded by Keith Sinclair	Bishop of Birkenhead; 2021 – present	Incumbent
