= Leonard Savill =

Anglican clergyman

Leonard Savill (1869–1959) was an eminent Anglican clergyman in the mid 20th century.

Savill was educated at Charterhouse; Jesus College, Cambridge; and Ripon College, Cuddesdon. He was ordained as deacon in 1892; and priest in 1894. He was a curate at St Bartholomew-the-Great, Smithfield from 1902 until 1916. He was the incumbent at Swanley and Dartford from 1916 to 1925; and Rural Dean of Dartford from 1919 to 1925, before his appointment as Tonbridge. He retired in 1939, and died on 21 October, 1959. Savill was buried at Turners Hill, West Sussex.

Church of England titles
Preceded by Avison Terry Scott	Archdeacon of Tonbridge; 1942 to 1968	Succeeded by William James Gray
