= Michael Stallibrass =

English cricketer (born 1951)

Personal information
- Full name: Michael James Dahl Stallibrass
- Born: 28 June 1951 (age 75); Poltimore, Devon, England
- Batting: Left-handed
- Bowling: Right-arm off break

Domestic team information
- Years: Team
- 1972–1974: Oxford University

Career statistics
Competition	First-class
Matches	21
Runs scored	194
Batting average	8.08
100s/50s	–/–
Top score	24
Balls bowled	1,900
Wickets	22
Bowling average	45.13
5 wickets in innings	1
10 wickets in match	–
Best bowling	5/80
Catches/stumpings	7/–
- Source: Cricinfo, 1 July 2020

Michael James Dahl Stallibrass (born 28 June 1951) is an English businessman and former first-class cricketer.

The son of the minor counties cricketer Jim Stallibrass, he was born in June 1951 at Poltimore, Devon. He later studied at Magdalen College at the University of Oxford. While studying at Oxford he played first-class cricket for Oxford University, making his debut against Warwickshire at Oxford in 1972. He played first-class cricket for Oxford until 1974, making twenty appearances. Playing as a right-arm off break bowler, Stallibrass took 22 wickets at an average of 38.86 runs per wicket. He took one five wicket haul against Lancashire in 1972, taking figures of 5 for 80. As a lower order batsman, he scored 193 runs in his twenty matches for Oxford, at an average of 8.04 and a high score of 24. In addition to playing for Oxford, Stallibrass also made a single appearance for a combined Oxford and Cambridge Universities team against the touring Indians in 1974.

After graduating from Oxford, Stallibrass became an investment banker in the City of London with UBS. He currently sits on the board of HAV Vaccines.
