= Richard Mason (priest) =

Anglican clergyman (1929–1997)

Richard John Mason (1929–1997) was an eminent Anglican clergyman in the second half of the 20th century.

The son of Vice-Admiral Sir Frank Mason, he was educated at Shrewsbury School. After an earlier career as a journalist he studied for ordination at Lincoln Theological College. He was priested in 1959 and began his ecclesiastical career with a curacy at Bishop's Hatfield. From 1964 to 1969 he was Chaplain to the Bishop of London, Robert Stopford. He then held incumbencies at Dunton Green, Edenbridge and Sevenoaks. He was Archdeacon of Tonbridge from 1977 to 1985.

Church of England titles
Preceded by Maples Earle	Archdeacon of Tonbridge; 1977–1985	Succeeded by Judith Rose
