= Dicky Rutnagur =

Indian sportswriter and journalist (1931–2013)

Dicky Jamshed Sohrab Rutnagur (26 February 1931 – 20 June 2013) was an Indian sports journalist. He was cricket correspondent for the Hindustan Times from 1958 to 1966, when he became a freelance based in the UK. He covered cricket, squash and badminton for The Daily Telegraph from 1966 to 2005.

A Parsi, he was born in Bandra and was educated at St. Xavier's College. He then worked in the family business, which published the Indian Textile Journal. He then began covering cricket matches as a freelance, writing for The Bharat, a local sports paper, and then for daily newspapers.

With Anandji Dossa, he co-edited The Indian Cricket-Field Annual throughout its life from 1957-8 to 1965-6. He first wrote for Wisden Cricketers' Almanack in 1963, and his most recent piece appeared in the 2007 edition. He wrote two books, including a biography of squash legend Jahangir Khan.

Encouraged to move to England by Ron Roberts, he joined The Daily Telegraph, for whom he covered county cricket from 1966 to 2005. According to his Wisden obituary, "a press box with Dicky in it was always full of cigarette smoke, chat and mischief, with whisky afterwards". He sometimes wrote for two national newspapers at the same time, as "Dilip Rao" when he wrote for The Guardian and as "D.J. Rutnagur" when writing for The Daily Telegraph.

He was the only person to witness both of two cricketing feats: when Garry Sobers hit six sixes in an over from Malcolm Nash in a County Championship match in Swansea in 1968 and, more than 16 years later, when Ravi Shastri did likewise, off Baroda slow left-armer Tilak Raj in a Ranji Trophy game in Bombay.

He died at the age of 82 on 20 June 2013 in London after a prolonged illness. He was the father of cricketer Richard Sohrab Rutnagur.

== Books ==
- Khans Unlimited: A History of Squash in Pakistan, Oxford University Press, 1997, ISBN 978-0-19-577805-2.
- Test Commentary, India v England, 1976–77
