= Archdeacon of Tonbridge =

Church of England ecclesiastical office

The Archdeacon of Tonbridge is a senior ecclesiastical officer in charge of the Archdeaconry of Tonbridge in the Church of England Diocese of Rochester. The archdeaconry was created from Rochester archdeaconry by Order in Council on 4 April 1906.

The archdeaconry covers 6 deaneries, namely Malling, Paddock Wood, Sevenoaks, Shoreham, Tonbridge and Tunbridge Wells.

== List of archdeacons ==
- 1906–18 June 1925 (d.): Avison Scott, Vicar of St James's Tunbridge Wells (first archdeacon)
- 1925–1940 (ret.): Leonard Savill (afterwards archdeacon emeritus)
- 1940–1953 (ret.): William Gray, Vicar of St Nicholas, Rochester (until 1942) then Vicar of Kippington (until 1952; afterwards archdeacon emeritus)
- 1953–1976 (ret.): Maples Earle, Rector of Wrotham (until 1959) then Vicar of Shipbourne (afterwards archdeacon emeritus)
- 1977–1995 (ret.): Richard Mason, Vicar of Edenbridge (until 1983) then Minister of St Luke's Sevenoaks (afterwards archdeacon emeritus)
- 1996–2002 (ret.): Judith Rose
- 2002 – 31 July 2017: Clive Mansell
- 24 September 2017 – 19 July 2021: Julie Conalty (became Bishop of Birkenhead)
- 16 January 2022 – October 2024 (res.): Sharon Copestake
- 23 February 2025 – present: Nick Cornell
