= William Gray (priest) =

William James Gray (4 August 1874 – 17 September 1960) was an eminent Anglican clergyman in the mid 20th century.

Gray was educated at the London College of Divinity. He became a deacon in 1905 and was ordained in 1906. After curacies in Brixton and Beckenham, he was Vicar of Ide Hill and Chaplain to Sevenoaks Workhouse and Infirmary from 1911 to 1915. He was the incumbent at St Nicholas with St Clement, Rochester from 1915 to 1942; Rural Dean of Rochester from 1925–40; Archdeacon of Tonbridge from 1940 to 1953; and Vicar of Kippington from 1942–52. He retired in 1953 and died on 17 September 1960.

Church of England titles
Preceded by Leonard Savill	Archdeacon of Tonbridge; 1940 to 1953	Succeeded by Maples Earle
