= Wormser-Coleman House =

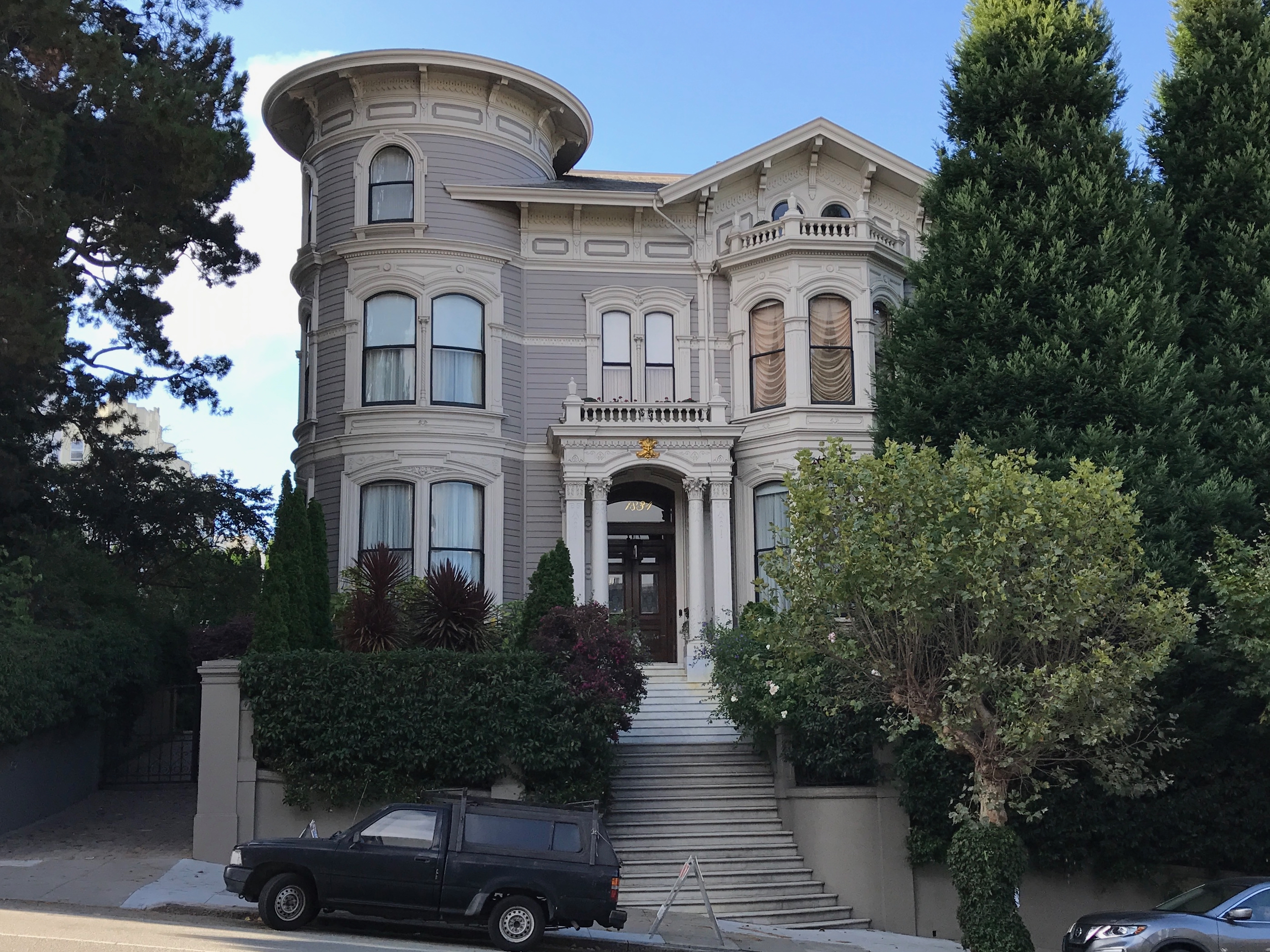

- Location in San Francisco County Location in California Location in United States
- 37.7910°N 122.4251°W
- Location: 1834 California Street, San Francisco, California, U.S.

History
- Built: 1876

Site notes
- Architectural style: Italianate architecture
- Governing body: private

San Francisco Designated Landmark
- Designated: 1 June 1973
- Reference no.: 53

Wormser-Coleman House, also known as the Isaac Wormser House and John C. Coleman House, is a historical building built in 1876, located at 1834 California Street in San Francisco, California. It has been listed as a San Francisco Designated Landmark since 1973. As of 2022, the building is a private residence.

== History ==
The house was originally built by Isaac Wormser (1822–1895), an importer and jobber of liquor.

In 1895, the house was sold to John C. Coleman, a businessman and politician. The property is on two lots that were merged by Coleman in order to create a spacious yard. Coleman also expanded the house.

== See also ==
- List of San Francisco Designated Landmarks
