= Charles Trouncer =

English cricketer

Charles Albert Trouncer (14 August 1866 – 13 March 1938) was an English first-class cricketer active 1887–90 who played for Surrey and Cambridge University. He was born in Uckfield; died in Anglesey.
