= Christopher Keey =

South African-born English cricketer

Personal information
- Full name: Christopher Leyton Keey
- Born: 27 December 1969 (age 56); Johannesburg, Transvaal, South Africa
- Batting: Right-handed
- Bowling: Right-arm off break

Domestic team information
- Years: Team
- 1992–1993: Oxford University

Career statistics
Competition	First-class	List A
Matches	18	1
Runs scored	649	1
Batting average	24.03	1.00
100s/50s	1/4	–/–
Top score	111	1
Catches/stumpings	5/–	–/–
- Source: Cricinfo, 4 September 2019

Christopher Leyton Keey (born 27 December 1969) is a South African-born English former cricketer.

Keey was born at Johannesburg in December 1969. He emigrated to England as a child, where he was educated at Harrow School, before going up to Keble College, Oxford. While studying at Oxford, he made his debut in first-class cricket for Oxford University against Worcestershire at Oxford in 1992. He played first-class cricket for Oxford until 1993, making a total of seventeen appearances. In his seventeen matches for Oxford, he scored a total of 612 runs at an average of 24.48. His highest score of 111, which was his only first-class century, came against Northamptonshire in 1993. He also made a single first-class appearance for a combined Oxford and Cambridge Universities cricket team against the touring Pakistanis in 1992. In addition to playing first-class cricket while at Oxford, he also made a single List A one-day appearance for the Combined Universities cricket team against Hampshire in the 1993 Benson & Hedges Cup, during which he was dismissed for a single run by Shaun Udal.
