= Ed Coleman =

Ed Coleman may refer to:

- Ed Coleman (baseball) (1901–1964), MLB player from 1932 to 1936
- Ed Coleman (sportscaster) (born 1949), radio host for the New York Mets on WFAN

== See also ==
- Edward Coleman (disambiguation)
