= Tim Firth (cricketer) =

English cricketer

Personal information
- Full name: Timothy Firth
- Born: 1 April 1964 (age 62); Bristol, England
- Batting: Right-handed
- Bowling: Right-arm medium

Domestic team information
- Years: Team
- 1987: Oxford University

Career statistics
Competition	First-class
Matches	7
Runs scored	33
Batting average	4.71
100s/50s	–/–
Top score	10
Balls bowled	1,257
Wickets	14
Bowling average	48.71
5 wickets in innings	–
10 wickets in match	–
Best bowling	4/129
Catches/stumpings	1/–
- Source: Cricinfo, 9 April 2020

Timothy Firth (born 1 April 1964) is an English educator and former first-class cricketer.

Firth was born at Bristol in April 1964. He was educated at Stockport Grammar School, before going up to the University of Sheffield where he studied English literature. From Sheffield, he completed his Postgraduate Certificate in Education at Oriel College, Oxford. While studying at Oxford, he played first-class cricket for Oxford University in 1987, making six appearances. In his six first-class matches for Oxford University, Firth who was in the team as a right-arm medium bowler, took 13 wickets at an average of 51.00 and best figures of 4 for 129. In addition to playing first-class cricket for Oxford University in 1987, he also appeared for a combined Oxford and Cambridge Universities team against the touring Pakistanis at Oxford. In a drawn rain-affected match, Firth took the only Pakistani wicket to fall when he dismissed Ijaz Ahmed.

After graduating from Oxford, Firth became a teacher at Bedford School. From there he taught at The Leys School in Cambridge, and later at King's Ely where he was head of English. From there he taught at Hurstpierpoint College in Sussex, where he was head of the college sixth form and had been acting headmaster. In September 2016, he was appointed headmaster of Wrekin College.
