= Guy Waller =

English cricketer

Personal information
- Full name: Guy de Warrenne Waller
- Born: 10 February 1950 (age 76); Savernake, Wiltshire, England
- Height: 5 ft 2 in (1.57 m)
- Batting: Right-handed
- Bowling: Right-arm off break

Domestic team information
- Years: Team
- 1973–1974: Oxford University

Career statistics
Competition	First-class
Matches	13
Runs scored	203
Batting average	8.45
100s/50s	–/–
Top score	29
Balls bowled	6
Wickets	0
Bowling average	–
5 wickets in innings	–
10 wickets in match	–
Best bowling	–
Catches/stumpings	10/–
- Source: Cricinfo, 7 March 2020

Guy de Warrenne Waller (born 10 February 1950) is an English former first-class cricketer and educator.

The son of Lieutenant–Colonel Desmond de Warrenne Waller and Angela Mary Wright, he was born in February 1950 at Savernake, Wiltshire. He was educated at Hurstpierpoint College, before going up to Worcester College, Oxford. While studying at Oxford, he played first-class cricket for Oxford University in 1973 and 1974. He made his debut against Lancashire at Oxford, with Waller making a total of twelve appearances. He scored a total of 186 runs in his twelve matches, at an average of 8.45 and with a high score of 29. In addition to playing first-class cricket for Oxford, Waller also played for a combined Oxford and Cambridge Universities team against the touring Indians in 1974.

After graduating from Oxford, Waller became a schoolteacher. He was the head of chemistry and a housemaster at Radley College, before becoming the headmaster of Lord Wandsworth College, a post he held until 1997. He was the headmaster of Cranleigh School for seventeen years, before retiring in June 2014.
