= Arthur Scott (cricketer, born 1883) =

English cricketer and Royal Navy officer

Captain Arthur Scott DSO
Personal information
- Full name: Arthur Avison Scott
- Born: 3 December 1883; Bootle, Lancashire, England
- Died: 6 January 1968 (aged 84); Attleborough, Norfolk, England
- Batting: Right-handed
- Bowling: Right-arm fast
- Relatives: Avison Scott (father); George Scott (brother)

Career statistics
Competition	First-class
Matches	1
Runs scored	9
Batting average	4.50
100s/50s	–/–
Top score	9
Balls bowled	120
Wickets	2
Bowling average	48.00
5 wickets in innings	–
10 wickets in match	–
Best bowling	1/46
Catches/stumpings	1/–
- Source: Cricinfo, 24 December 2019

Arthur Avison Scott DSO (3 December 1883 – 6 January 1968) was an English first-class cricketer and Royal Navy officer.

The son of the Reverend Avison Scott and Dorothea Sarah Tillard, he was born at Bootle in December 1883. He attended the Britannia Royal Naval College, from where he graduated into the Royal Navy as an acting paymaster sub-lieutenant. He was confirmed in the rank of sub-lieutenant in April 1904, with promotion to lieutenant following in October 1905. Scott made a single appearance in first-class cricket for the Royal Navy against the British Army cricket team at Lord's in 1912. He took 2 wickets in the match and scored 9 runs.

He was promoted to the rank of lieutenant commander in September 1913 and the following year he served in the First World War, during which he was mentioned in dispatches for his role in the Evacuation of Gallipoli in late 1915 and early 1916. Scott commanded HMS Lawford during the Battle of Dover Strait in October 1916. He was made decorated with the Bronze Medal of Military Valor by Italy in March 1918, in addition to being made a Companion of the Distinguished Service Order in June 1918. The following month he was promoted to commander. Scott was placed on the retired list in January 1923.

Nearly six years after retiring, he was granted the rank of captain in December 1928. He died in January 1968 at Attleborough, Norfolk. His brother, George, also played first-class cricket.
