= Mark Logan (cricketer) =

South African cricketer (born 1960)

Personal information
- Full name: Mark Brian Logan
- Born: 17 April 1960 (age 66); Durban, South Africa
- Batting: Right-handed
- Bowling: Right-arm off-spin

Domestic team information
- Years: Team
- 1980-81 to 1993-94: Natal

Career statistics
| Competition | First-class | List A |
|---|---|---|
| Matches | 58 | 68 |
| Runs scored | 3342 | 1722 |
| Batting average | 33.42 | 26.90 |
| 100s/50s | 6/15 | 2/8 |
| Top score | 172 | 115* |
| Balls bowled | 80 | 6 |
| Wickets | 2 | 0 |
| Bowling average | 27.50 | – |
| 5 wickets in innings | 0 | – |
| 10 wickets in match | 0 | – |
| Best bowling | 2/15 | – |
| Catches/stumpings | 45/– | 9/– |
- Source: Cricinfo, 21 April 2018

Mark Brian Logan (born 17 April 1960) is a former cricketer who played first-class cricket in South Africa from 1981 to 1993.

A batsman who usually opened the innings, Logan made his highest first-class score of 172 when he captained the South African Defence Force team against Eastern Province in 1984–85. His highest score for Natal, for whom he played most of his cricket, was 150 (after scoring 53 in the first innings) against Transvaal in the 1991–92 Castle Cup. He had made his highest List A score earlier that season, 115 retired hurt.
