= Defence Force Ground =

Cricket ground in Windhoek, Namibia

- Location: Windhoek, Namibia
- Establishment: 1988 (first recorded match)
- As of 26 September 2011; Source: Ground profile

Defence Force Ground is a cricket ground in Windhoek, Namibia. The first recorded match on the ground was in 1988 when the South African Defence Force played Boland in a first-class match. At the time Namibia was known as South West Africa and was occupied by South Africa, only gaining independence in 1990. The last recorded match played on the ground came in 2001 when the Namibia national cricket team played the Marylebone Cricket Club.
