= Judith Rose =

Retired Anglican priest

Kathleen Judith Rose (born 14 June 1937) is a British retired Anglican priest. She was one of the first female priests to hold a senior management role in the Church of England when she served as Archdeacon of Tonbridge from 1996 to 2002.

== Biography ==
Rose was educated at Sexey's Grammar School, Seale-Hayne College and the London Bible College. She had earlier career in agriculture.

Rose became a parish worker at Rodbourne Cheney Parish Church, in 1976. She was made deaconess in 1976, and was ordained in the Church of England as a deacon in 1987 and as a priest in 1994. She was at St George, Leeds from 1973 to 1981; chaplain at Bradford Cathedral from 1981 to 1985; minister at St Paul's Parkwood, Gillingham from 1986 to 1990; Rural Dean of Gillingham from 1988 to 1990; Chaplain to the Bishop of Rochester from 1990 to 1995; and Archdeacon of Tonbridge from 1996 to 2002.

Rose belongs to the evangelical wing of the Church of England.

== Selected works ==
A published author, her works include:

- Sunday Learning for All Ages, 1982
- Women Priests: the first years, 1996
- Voices of this Calling, 2002

Church of England titles
Preceded by Richard Mason	Archdeacon of Tonbridge; 1996 to 2002	Succeeded by Clive Mansell
