= Edward Colman =

Edward Colman may refer to:

- Edward Colman (martyr) (1636–1678), English Catholic martyr
- Edward Colman (serjeant-at-arms) (c. 1734–1815), English politician, courtier, and Serjeant-at-Arms of the House of Commons
- Edward Colman (American politician) (1828–1898), American Civil War officer and member of the Wisconsin State Senate
- Edward Colman (cinematographer) (1905–1995), American cinematographer
- Eddie Colman (1936–1958), English footballer

== See also ==
- Edward Coleman (disambiguation)
