= Simon Sutcliffe =

English cricketer (born 1960)

Simon Paul Sutcliffe (born 22 May 1960) is a former English cricketer active from 1980 to 1983 who played for Warwickshire, Oxford University and the combined Oxford and Cambridge Universities cricket team. He was born in Watford. He appeared in 38 first-class matches as a righthanded batsman who bowled right arm off break. He scored 141 runs with a highest score of 20 and held six catches. He took 96 wickets with a best performance of six for 19.
