= Clive Mansell =

British Anglican priest (born 1953)

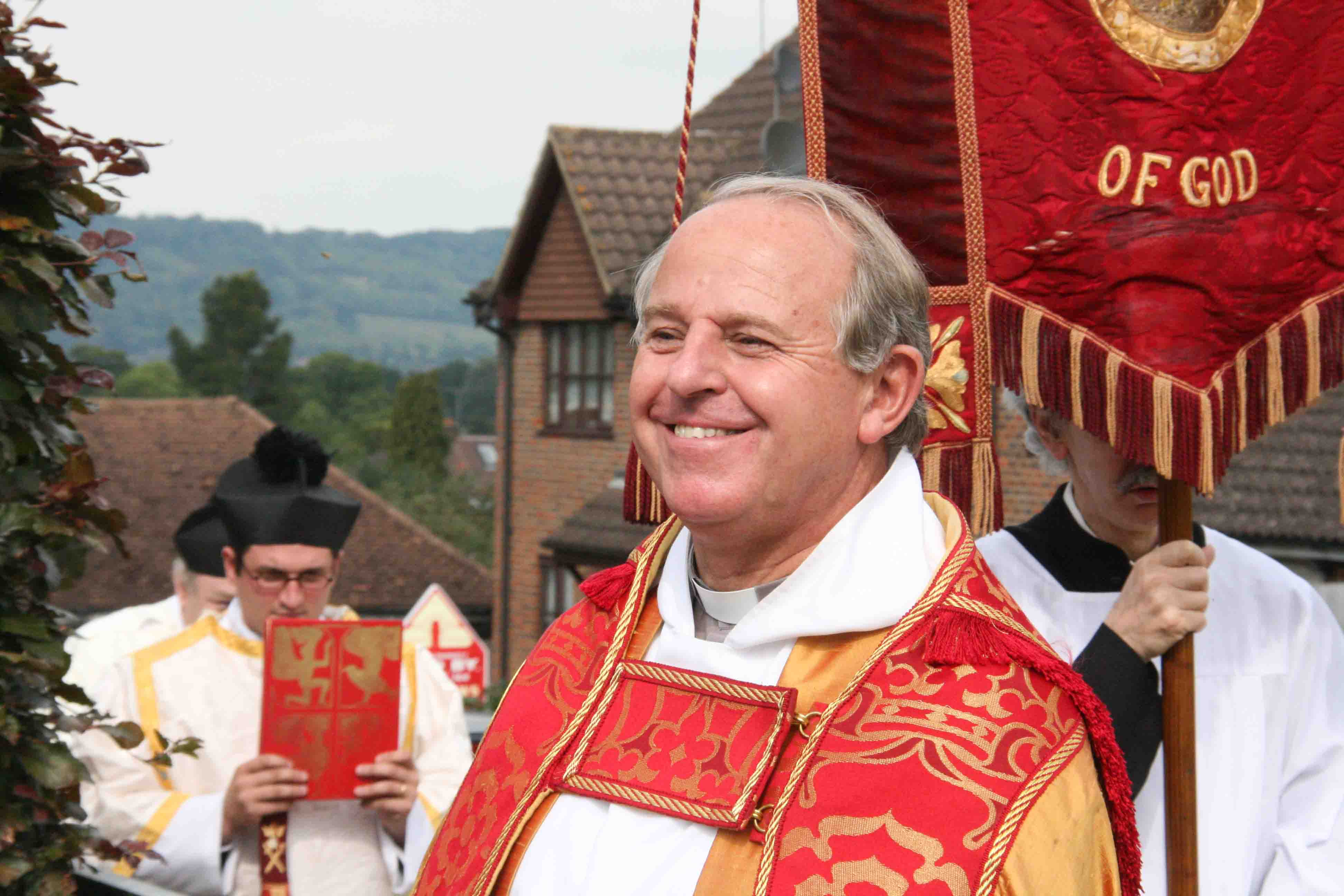
The Venerable Clive Mansell, 2010

Clive Neville Ross Mansell (born 20 April 1953) is a British Anglican priest who was Archdeacon of Tonbridge from 2002 until 31 July 2017.

Mansell was educated at the City of London School, the University of Leicester and Trinity College, Bristol. After an earlier career as a solicitor he was ordained deacon in 1982 and priest in 1983. After a curacy at Great Malvern Priory he was a Minor Canon at Ripon Cathedral from 1985 to 1989. He was then Rector of Kirklington from 1989 to 2002; and Area Dean of Wensley from 1998 to 2002.

Church of England titles
Preceded by Judith Rose	Archdeacon of Tonbridge; 2002–2017	Succeeded by Julie Conalty
