= John C. Coleman =

American businessperson and politician

- (undated)

Member of the California State Senate

Personal details
- Born: August 9, 1823 Walton, Suffolk, England
- Died: March 23, 1919 (aged 95) San Francisco, California, U.S.
- Spouse(s): Mary Lucretia Bush, Persis Hannah Sibley
- Children: 10
- Occupation: businessman and politician

John Crisp Coleman (August 9, 1823 – March 23, 1919) was a California mining, railroad, and public utility magnate, and served in the California State Senate. He was the first President of the Nevada County Narrow Gauge Railroad, President of the North Star Mine in Grass Valley, Vice President of the Fireman's Fund Insurance Company, and Vice President of California Street Cable. He also served as director of the Pacific Rolling Mills, the Contra Costa Gas Company, and the North Shore Railroad.

== Career ==
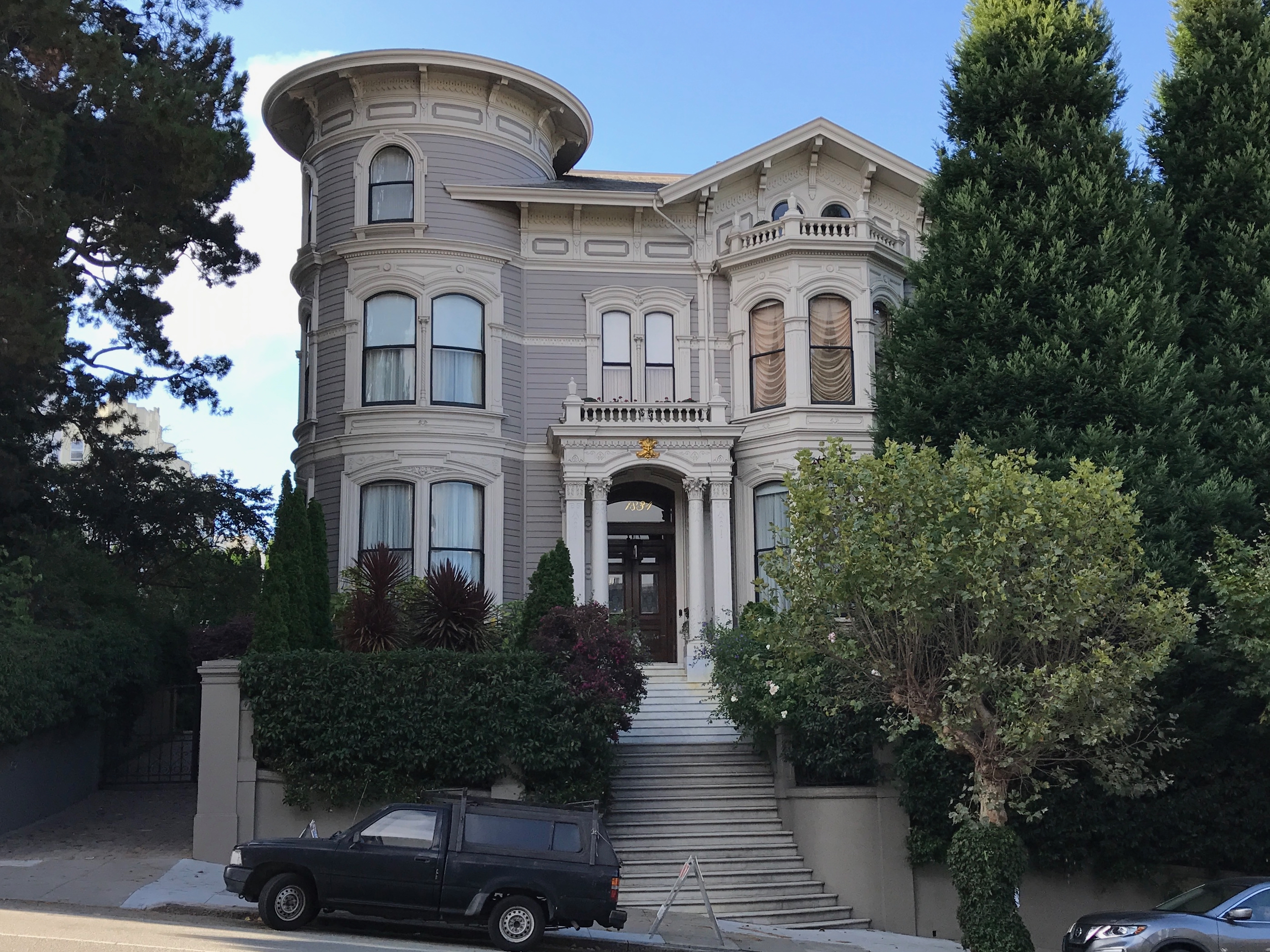
Coleman's residence at 1834 California Street, San Francisco

Coleman was born in Walton, Suffolk, England. John and his brother, Edward, arrived at Hangtown Creek, California, in 1850. The two brothers mined at Canon Creek, El Dorado County, and two years later, mined at Iowa Hill, Placer County, where he served as President of the Sons of Temperance. About this time, he went East to visit family and buy cattle.

In 1860, they moved to Grass Valley, Nevada County, and with others, bought the Helvetia and Lafayette Mining Company. The brothers opened the Morning Star Mine (Placer County) and the Idaho Mine (Nevada County) in 1867; they were also part owners in the North Star Mine and the Hueston Hill Company.

== Personal life ==
Coleman married Mary Lucretia Bush in 1856, and following her death in 1868, he was married in 1870 to Persis Hannah Sibley. Ten children survived him when he died.

Coleman was a Freemason, and a Trustee of the Grass Valley Congregational church.

The Wormser-Coleman House on 1834 California Street in San Francisco was owned by Coleman and is a San Francisco Designated Landmark. The Coleman Memorial Laboratory at the University of California, San Francisco, Department of Otolaryngology, Head and Neck Surgery is dedicated to John C. and Edward Coleman.
