= Mike Burton (cricketer) =

Zimbabwean cricketer (born 1944)

Personal information
- Full name: Michael St John Whitehead Burton
- Born: 14 February 1944 (age 82); Bulawayo, Southern Rhodesia
- Batting: Right-handed
- Bowling: Right-arm off break

Domestic team information
- Years: Team
- 1964/65–1967/68: Eastern Province
- 1969–1971: Oxford University

Career statistics
Competition	First-class
Matches	37
Runs scored	821
Batting average	15.20
100s/50s	–/2
Top score	84
Balls bowled	7,308
Wickets	77
Bowling average	43.07
5 wickets in innings	2
10 wickets in match	–
Best bowling	5/69
Catches/stumpings	15/–
- Source: Cricinfo, 23 May 2020

Michael St John Whitehead Burton (born 14 February 1944) is a Zimbabwean former first-class cricketer.

Burton was born in February 1944 at Bulawayo, in what was then a part of Southern Rhodesia. He was educated at Umtali Boys' High School. Burton was selected to represent a South African Schools XI in cricket, before gaining first-class experience with Eastern Province. He debuted for Eastern Province against the touring Marylebone Cricket Club at Port Elizabeth in 1964. He played first-class cricket intermittently for Eastern Province until November 1967, making five appearances. He took 7 wickets for Eastern Province with his off break bowling, in addition to scoring 102 runs.

Burton went up to Mansfield College at the University of Oxford as a Rhodes Scholar in 1968. While studying at Oxford, he played first-class cricket for Oxford University, making his varsity debut against Lancashire at Oxford in 1969. He played first-class cricket for Oxford until 1971, making 31 appearances. Burton took 70 wickets for Oxford at an average of 40.24. He took a five wicket haul on two occasions, with best figures of 5 for 96, which came against Nottinghamshire in 1970. As a batsman, he scored 719 runs at a batting average of 15.63 and with a high score of 84. In addition to playing first-class cricket for Oxford, Burton also appeared in a single match for a combined Oxford and Cambridge Universities team against the touring West Indians in 1969. He captained Oxford in 1969–70, the first Rhodes Scholar to do so.
