= William Deacon (cricketer) =

English cricketer and banker

Personal information
- Full name: William Samuel Deacon
- Born: 3 May 1828; Battersea, Surrey, England
- Died: 4 March 1903 (aged 74); Cobham, Surrey, England
- Height: 5 ft 11 in (1.80 m)
- Batting: Unknown
- Bowling: Unknown

Domestic team information
- Years: Team
- 1848–1850: Cambridge University

Career statistics
| Competition | First-class |
|---|---|
| Matches | 13 |
| Runs scored | 328 |
| Batting average | 14.90 |
| 100s/50s | –/1 |
| Top score | 54 |
| Balls bowled | ? |
| Wickets | 1 |
| Bowling average | ? |
| 5 wickets in innings | – |
| 10 wickets in match | – |
| Best bowling | 1/? |
| Catches/stumpings | 5/– |
- Source: Cricinfo, 22 July 2020

William Samuel Deacon (3 May 1828 – 4 March 1903) was an English first-class cricketer and banker.

Deacon was born in Battersea in May 1828. He was educated at Eton College, before going up to Trinity College, Cambridge. In his freshman year of 1847 at Cambridge, he made his debut in first-class cricket for the Gentlemen of Kent against the Gentlemen of England at Canterbury. The following year, he made his debut for Cambridge University against the Cambridge Townsmen, with Deacon playing first-class cricket for Cambridge from 1848 to 1850, making nine appearances. In these nine matches, he scored 250 runs at an average of 16.66 and with a high score of 54. In addition to playing first-class cricket for the university, Decon also made a single appearance for a combined Oxford and Cambridge University team against the Gentlemen of England in 1848. Alongside a further two appearances for the Gentlemen of Kent, Deacon made thirteen appearances in first-class cricket. Described by the Wisden Cricketers' Almanack as a "fine free hitter", he scored 328 runs in these matches at an average of 14.90, with one half-century. He captained Cambridge University in 1850, gaining a blue in 1848, 1849, and 1850.

By profession a banker, Deacon died in Cobham in March 1903.
