= Norman Botton =

English cricketer

Personal information
- Full name: Norman Denis Botton
- Born: 21 January 1954 (age 72); Hammersmith, London, England
- Batting: Left-handed
- Bowling: Left-arm medium

Domestic team information
- Years: Team
- 1974–1975: Oxford University

Career statistics
Competition	First-class
Matches	15
Runs scored	286
Batting average	11.91
100s/50s	–/–
Top score	38*
Balls bowled	1,512
Wickets	11
Bowling average	64.90
5 wickets in innings	–
10 wickets in match	–
Best bowling	2/53
Catches/stumpings	10/–
- Source: Cricinfo, 1 January 2020

Norman Denis Botton (born 21 January 1954) is a former English first-class cricketer.

Born at Hammersmith, Botton attended Hertford College, Oxford. While studying at Oxford, Botton played first-class cricket for Oxford University. His debut came against Leicestershire at Oxford in 1974. He played first-class cricket for Oxford until 1975, making fourteen appearances. In his fourteen matches, he scored a total of 272 runs at an average of 12.36 and with a high score of 38 not out. With his left-arm medium pace bowling, he took 11 wickets at a bowling average of 64.90, with best figures of 2 for 53. He also made a single first-class appearance for a combined Oxford and Cambridge Universities cricket team against the touring West Indians in 1974.

After graduating from Oxford, Botton became a schoolteacher. Prior to his retirement, he was the head of history at Monkton Combe School. Botton continued to play cricket long after the conclusion of his brief first-class career, featuring for the Somerset Over-50s and Over-60s. However, severe osteoarthritis which restricted his ability to walk made it impossible to play cricket. In 2013, Botton received a hip replacement and within ten months he was playing cricket once more, resulting in him being selected to play for the England Over-60s on their 2016 tour of Australia.
