= Maples Earle =

(Edward Ernest) Maples Earle (1900–1994) was an eminent Anglican clergyman in the 20th century.

Earle was born on 22 December 1900, educated at the London College of Divinity and ordained in 1925. After curacies in Crayford and Keston he held incumbencies at Bexley, Rainham, Chatham and Shipbourne. He was Archdeacon of Tonbridge from 1953 to 1976.

He died on 15 March 1994

Church of England titles
Preceded by William James Gray	Archdeacon of Tonbridge; 1953 to 1976	Succeeded by Richard John Mason
