= Peter Jones (cricketer, born 1948) =

Rhodesian cricketer

Personal information
- Full name: Peter Charles Howard Jones
- Born: 19 August 1948 (age 78); Southern Rhodesia
- Batting: Right-handed
- Bowling: Leg-break

Domestic team information
- Years: Team
- 1971–1972: Oxford University
- FC debut: 21 April 1971 Oxford Univ v Warwickshire
- Last FC: 1 July 1972 Oxford Univ v Cambridge Univ

Career statistics
Competition	First-class
Matches	26
Runs scored	522
Batting average	14.10
100s/50s	0/1
Top score	67
Balls bowled	733
Wickets	13
Bowling average	40.38
5 wickets in innings	0
10 wickets in match	0
Best bowling	3/51
Catches/stumpings	13/–
- Source: Cricket Archive, 10 September 2009

Peter Charles Howard Jones (19 August 1948 – 22 December 2017) is a former cricketer, born in Southern Rhodesia (today Zimbabwe), who played for Oxford University in 1971–72 during his education there. He played 26 first class matches against various county sides and the touring Australian side in England for the 1972 Ashes.
