= Edward Coleman House =

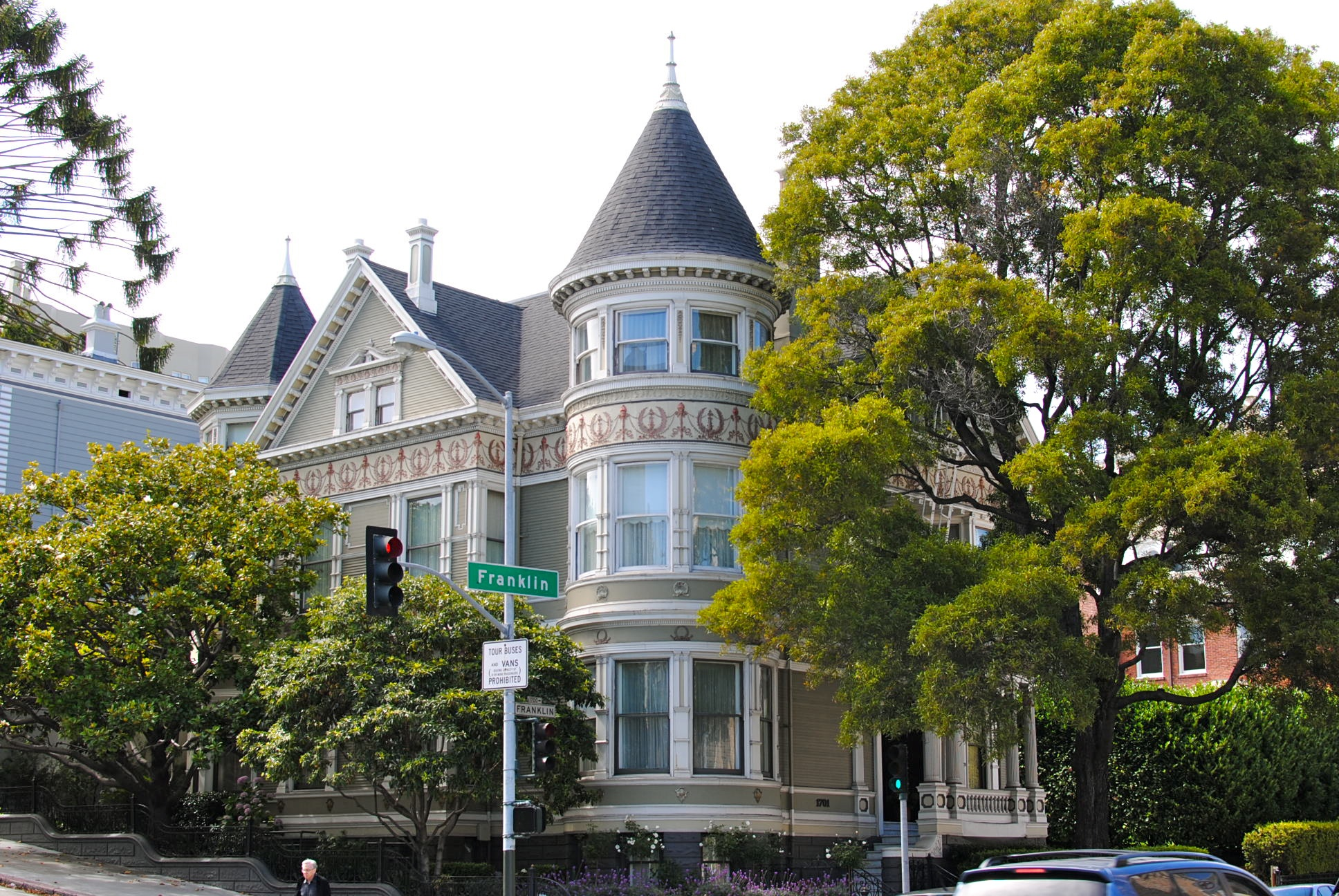
- Edward Coleman House in 2010

- Location within San Francisco County Location within California
- 37.7903907°N 122.424208°W
- Location: 1701 Franklin Street, San Francisco, California, United States

History
- Built: 1895

Site notes
- Area: 7,125 square feet (661.9 m^{2})
- Architect: W. H. Lille
- Architectural style: Queen Anne style

San Francisco Designated Landmark
- Designated: July 6, 1973
- Reference no.: 54

Edward Coleman House is a historic residence in the Pacific Heights neighborhood in San Francisco, California, United States. It has been listed as a San Francisco designated landmark since 1973. It's a private home, and is not open to the public.

== History ==
The house was designed by architect W. H. Lille in a Queen Anne style for Edward Coleman (1830–1913). Coleman was born in Maine, and came to California in 1853 during the California gold rush. He developed a few successful mines in Grass Valley, California. He has a second house also named the Edward Coleman House in Grass Valley. When Coleman became a widower, he lived in the San Francisco house with his sister until his death in 1913.

The house is 7,125 square feet (661.9 m^{2}) and contains 11 bedrooms, and 5.5 bathrooms. The rear of the house contains a stained glass enclosed stairwell.

It is located next to the historic Lilienthal–Orville Pratt House, another city designated landmark. In March 2018, the Edward Coleman House sold for US$7 million.

== See also ==
- List of San Francisco Designated Landmarks
