= Kimpton, Missouri =

Extinct hamlet in Missouri, U.S.

Coordinates: 38.717788°N 94.368838°W

Kimpton is an extinct town in Cass County, in the U.S. state of Missouri.

Kimpton was platted in 1891, and named after a local merchant. A post office called Kimpton was established in 1889, and remained in operation until 1902.
