= Edward Sayres =

English cricketer

Edward Sayres (born 19 December 1815 at North Stoke, Sussex; died 11 January 1888 at Cold Ashton, Gloucestershire) was an English amateur cricketer who played from 1838 to 1842.

Edward Sayres was educated at Trinity College, Cambridge. A right-handed batsman and right arm slow roundarm bowler who was mainly associated with Cambridge University, Marylebone Cricket Club (MCC) and Sussex, he made 24 known appearances and took 100 wickets. He played for the Gentlemen in the Gentlemen v Players series.

In later life he was a clergyman. He was ordained in Norwich in 1845, and served as rector at Cold Ashton from 1850 until his death in 1888. He and his wife Anna married in 1847 and had four sons and three daughters.
