= Edward Coleman (miner) =

California Gold Rush mine manager

Edward Coleman (1830–1913) was an American mine manager, president, and superintendent during the California gold rush in Nevada County. He also served as President of the Board of School Trustees in Grass Valley; and Vice President of the Nevada County Narrow Gauge Railroad. His brother, John C. Coleman, was the railroad's first president; John was also president of the North Star Mine.

== Early years ==
Coleman was born August 28, 1830, in Walton, Suffolk, and he attended school in England. He left England with his parents in May, 1846, for Canada. He lived in Montreal for a year, and then went to Toronto, where he remained until the spring of 1852, before moving to New York City.

== Career ==
Edward and his brother John left for California in the spring of 1853, arriving a few miles north of Marysville in October. The brothers moved on to Canon Creek in El Dorado County, where Edward was interested in mining. In 1855, they moved to Iowa Hill, Placer County where they mined together until early in the spring of 1860. In February 1860, the brothers and others purchased the Helvetia and Lafayette Mining Company in Grass Valley, Nevada County. Subsequently, Edward became administrator of the North Star Mine, and John became the President. In 1867, the brothers sold out their interest in that mining company and formed the Idaho Quartz Mining Company, of which Edward was the President and Superintendent until the mine was worked out in 1893. He held interests in the Mohawk Lumber Company.

== Personal life ==
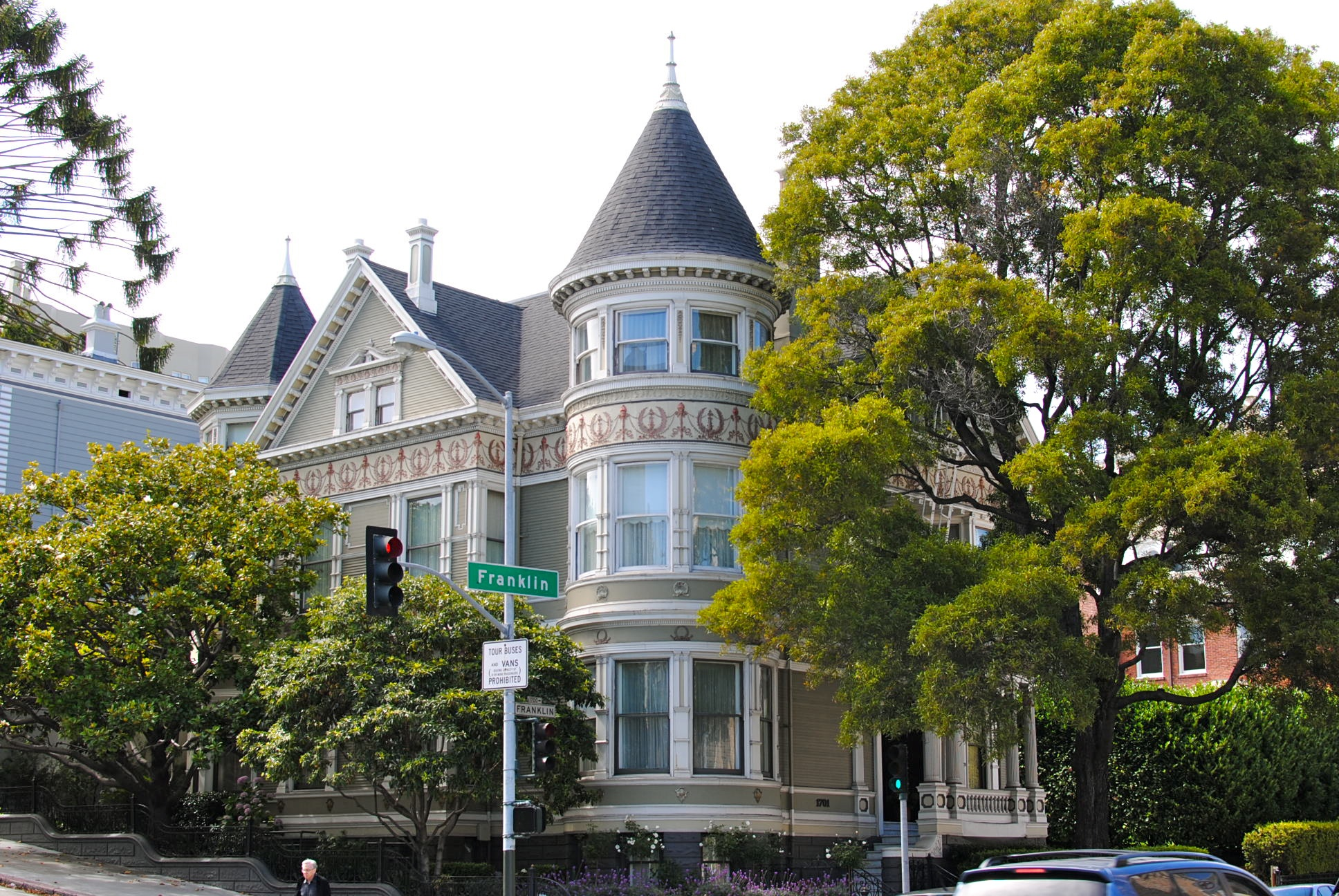
Edward Coleman House at 1701 Franklin Street, San Francisco

Coleman was married December 26, 1865 to Luisa; they had no children. He was a Freemason and a Congregationalist. He served two terms as President of the Board of School Trustees of Grass Valley.

The Edward Coleman House in Grass Valley on the corner of South Church Street and Neal Street came under protection in 1996 by the Nevada County Historical Landmarks Commission. The Edward Coleman House in San Francisco, at 1701 Franklin Street, is a San Francisco Designated Landmark. When Coleman become a widower, he lived in the San Francisco house with his sister.

The Coleman Memorial Laboratory at the University of California, San Francisco, Department of Otolaryngology, Head and Neck Surgery is dedicated to John C. and Edward Coleman.
