= Stephen Kimpton =

Australian cricketer

Personal information
- Full name: Stephen MacDonald Kimpton
- Born: 5 March 1914; Toorak, Victoria, Australia
- Died: 18 July 1997 (aged 83); Melbourne, Victoria, Australia
- Batting: Left-handed
- Bowling: Right-arm slow
- Relatives: Roger Kimpton (brother)

Domestic team information
- Years: Team
- 1935: Oxford University

Career statistics
| Competition | First-class |
|---|---|
| Matches | 4 |
| Runs scored | 112 |
| Batting average | 18.66 |
| 100s/50s | –/– |
| Top score | 31 |
| Balls bowled | 678 |
| Wickets | 9 |
| Bowling average | 42.66 |
| 5 wickets in innings | – |
| 10 wickets in match | – |
| Best bowling | 4/65 |
| Catches/stumpings | 1/– |
- Source: Cricinfo, 7 July 2020

Stephen MacDonald Kimpton (5 March 1914 – 18 July 1997) was an Australian first-class cricketer.

The son of Victor Yule Kimpton, he was born in the inner Melbourne suburb of Toorak in March 1914. He was educated at Melbourne Grammar School, before studying in England at Brasenose College, Oxford. While studying at Oxford, he played first-class cricket for Oxford University in 1935, making four appearances. Kimpton scored 112 runs in his four matches, at an average of 18.66 and a high score of 31. With his right-arm slow bowling, he took 9 wickets at a bowling average of 42.66 and best figures of 4 for 65.

After graduating from Oxford, Kimpton went into business, which included roles as chairman of the Commercial Bank of Australia and deputy chairman of Westpac Banking Corporation. Kimpton died at Melbourne in July 1997. His brother, Roger, was also a first-class cricketer who played county cricket in England.
