= Edward Coleman (cricketer) =

English cricketer

Personal information
- Full name: Edward Charles Coleman
- Born: 5 September 1891; Southend-on-Sea, Essex, England
- Died: 2 April 1917 (aged 25); Salonica, Greece
- Batting: Right-handed
- Role: Wicket-keeper

Domestic team information
- Years: Team
- 1911–1912: Essex

Career statistics
| Competition | FC |
|---|---|
| Matches | 3 |
| Runs scored | 14 |
| Batting average |
| 100s/50s |
| Top score |
| Balls bowled |
| Wickets |
| Bowling average |
| 5 wickets in innings |
| 10 wickets in match |
| Best bowling |
| Catches/stumpings |
- Source: Cricinfo, 22 July 2013

Edward Coleman (5 September 1891 – 2 April 1917) was an English cricketer. He played for Essex between 1911 and 1912. He was killed in action during World War I.
