= Roger Kimpton =

Personal information
- Full name: Roger Charles MacDonald Kimpton
- Born: 21 September 1916; Toorak, Melbourne, Victoria, Australia
- Died: 30 November 1999 (aged 83); Melbourne, Victoria, Australia
- Batting: Right-handed
- Bowling: Leg-spin
- Role: Batsman and wicket-keeper

Domestic team information
- Years: Team
- 1935–1938: Oxford University
- 1937–1949: Worcestershire

Career statistics
Competition	FC
Matches	62
Runs scored	3,562
Batting average	35.26
100s/50s	8/19
Top score	160
Balls bowled	2,138
Wickets	28
Bowling average	47.71
5 wickets in innings	0
10 wickets in match	0
Best bowling	4-42
Catches/stumpings	57/14
- Source: , 11 August 2008

Roger Charles MacDonald Kimpton, DFC (21 September 1916 – 30 November 1999) was an Australian first-class cricketer who played 62 first-class games, mostly in the late 1930s. The majority of his appearances were for Oxford University and Worcestershire, although he appeared for the Gentlemen in both 1936 and 1937 (only the latter game being played at Lord's) and for an England XI in 1937. Unusually, he alternated somewhat between keeping wicket and bowling, although his success with the ball was limited.

Aged 18, Kimpton made his first-class debut for Oxford against his future county, Worcestershire, at The Parks in early May 1935, a game which the university won by an innings. Kimpton showed his versatility by scoring 38, bowling five (admittedly wicketless) overs and claiming a catch and a stumping (even though Norman Knight was Oxford's named keeper). In his second match, Kimpton made what was to remain his career best innings when he hit 160 versus Gloucestershire; these runs were hit in 155 minutes, and included a whirlwind hour in which he added 138 with Sandy Singleton. His seven further games for Oxford that summer were relatively uneventful.

In early May 1936 Kimpton again punished Gloucestershire, scoring a century in each innings. Later that same month he hit a second-innings 102 (from number eight) in 70 minutes – despite needing a runner — against Lancashire, then followed that up with 110 not out and 85 against Free Foresters; in the latter game he also took a career best 4–42. He was picked for the Gentlemen v Players game at Folkestone at the end of the summer, and scored 115. Kimpton's hundred against Lancashire had put him on course for that season's Walter Lawrence Trophy, but Leslie Ames pipped him to the title by two minutes in the final match of the year.

1937 saw Kimpton make his debut in county cricket, although he continued to turn out for Oxford. He had by some distance his most productive season, scoring 1,568 runs in all first-class cricket at an average of 34.84, although despite a dozen innings between 50 and 99 he only managed one century. This, the only three-figure score he ever made for Worcestershire, came against Derbyshire in late August. In July he made his second appearance for the Gentlemen, this time at Lord's, and struck 59 in the first innings, while at the end of the summer he represented an England XI against the New Zealanders at Folkestone.

Kimpton played ten games in 1938, including two on the joint Oxford and Cambridge Universities tour of Jamaica in August, but found little success, making only two half-centuries and averaging under 24. He played no cricket in 1939, and with the outbreak of the Second World War he returned to Australia to join the RAAF as a fighter pilot. In this role he won the Distinguished Flying Cross, the citation noting his "aggressive and determined leadership" during 140 sorties over the Pacific Ocean.

After the war Kimpton played little, being largely occupied with the family business in Melbourne, but he did make three further first-class appearances. There was a one-off game for Worcestershire in 1949, in which he showed his continuing ability by taking 93* off Nottinghamshire; and in 1955-56 he accepted an invitation from E. W. Swanton to join his tour to the West Indies, playing his final two matches at the age of 39.

As well as cricket, Kimpton was an accomplished tennis player, winning the freshmen's tournament; he also achieved a blue at golf.

His brother Stephen played four matches for Oxford University in 1935, appearing alongside Roger in two of them.
