= South African Defence Force cricket team =

South African Defence Force was a first-class cricket team in South Africa. They played six first-class friendly matches, one match per season, between October 1984 and October 1989.

At the time the strength of the South African Defence Force was boosted by conscription for all young white men, and as a consequence the South African Defence Force team were able to call on many young first-class cricketers, some of whom went on to play at Test level in the 1990s.

== Matches ==
South African Defence Force began with a high-scoring draw against Eastern Province in 1984–85, then lost narrowly to Boland in 1985–86, easily beat Griqualand West in 1986–87, lost narrowly to Natal in 1987–88, drew against Boland in 1988–89, and finally drew against Orange Free State in 1989–90.

The 1988-89 match against Boland was played at the Defence Force Ground, Windhoek. It was the first first-class match ever played in Namibia.

== Leading players ==
Five South African Defence Force players scored centuries. The highest was 172 by Mark Logan, the side's first captain, against Eastern Province. The best bowling figures were 4 for 80 and 7 for 63 by Allan Donald in the victory over Griqualand West. The South African Defence Force players who later played Test cricket were Donald, Dave Callaghan, John Commins, Clive Eksteen, Steve Elworthy, Brian McMillan, Dave Richardson and Mark Rushmere.
