= Charles Tillard =

English cricketer (1851–1944)

Charles Tillard (18 April 1851 – 7 March 1944) was an English first-class cricketer active 1871–75 who played for Surrey and Cambridge University. He was born in Wimbledon; died in Bathford.
