= 1986 Benson & Hedges Cup =

- Administrator: Test and County Cricket Board
- Cricket format: Limited overs cricket (55 overs per innings)
- Champions: Middlesex (2nd title)
- Participants: 20
- Matches: 47
- Most runs: 378 Mike Gatting (Middlesex)
- Most wickets: 13 Richard Ellison (Kent)

The 1986 Benson & Hedges Cup was the fifteenth edition of cricket's Benson & Hedges Cup.

The competition was won by Middlesex County Cricket Club.

== Fixtures and results ==
=== Group stage ===
==== Group A ====
Team	Pld	W	L	NR	A	Pts	BowSR
Derbyshire	4	4	0	0	0	8	31.824
Northamptonshire	4	3	1	0	0	6	52.640
Warwickshire	4	2	2	0	0	4	44.586
Leicestershire	4	1	3	0	0	2	40.438
Minor Counties	4	0	4	0	0	0	54.000

==== Group B ====
Team	Pld	W	L	NR	A	Pts	BowSR
Worcestershire	4	3	1	0	0	6	37.765
Nottinghamshire	4	3	1	0	0	6	54.292
Yorkshire	4	2	2	0	0	4	36.294
Lancashire	4	1	3	0	0	2	49.846
Scotland	4	1	3	0	0	2	51.125

==== Group C ====
Team	Pld	W	L	NR	A	Pts	BowSR
Essex	4	4	0	0	0	8	38.647
Sussex	4	3	1	0	0	6	29.485
Gloucestershire	4	2	2	0	0	4	38.067
Somerset	4	1	3	0	0	2	41.258
Glamorgan	4	0	4	0	0	0	51.600

==== Group D ====
Team	Pld	W	L	NR	A	Pts	BowSR
Middlesex	4	4	0	0	0	8	32.533
Kent	4	2	2	0	0	4	36.697
Hampshire	4	2	2	0	0	4	41.240
Surrey	4	2	2	0	0	4	56.826
Oxford and Cambridge Universities	4	0	4	0	0	0	105.875

=== Quarter-finals ===
28 May 1986
(scorecard)

Derbyshire; 238/6 (55 overs)	v	Kent; 242/6 (53.4 overs)
John Morris 65; Eldine Baptiste 2/38 (11 overs)		Chris Cowdrey 63*; Roger Finney 2/26 (11 overs)

Kent won by 4 wickets
County Ground, Derby
Umpires: Jack Birkenshaw & John Holder
Player of the match: Chris Cowdrey (Kent)

28, 29 May 1986
(scorecard)

Essex; 195/9 (55 overs)	v	Nottinghamshire; 196/7 (51.1 overs)
Keith Fletcher 37; Clive Rice 5/48 (11 overs)		Richard Hadlee 61*; Graham Gooch 3/26 (11 overs)

Nottinghamshire won by 3 wickets
County Ground, Chelmsford
Umpires: Don Oslear & Ken Palmer
Player of the match: Clive Rice (Nottinghamshire)

- Reserve day used. Nottinghamshire were 39/3 (11 overs) at the close of the first day's play.

28, 29 May 1986
(scorecard)

Middlesex; 256/5 (55 overs)	v	Sussex; 172 all out (48 overs)
Roland Butcher 65; Dermot Reeve 2/54 (11 overs)		Imran Khan 47; Norman Cowans 3/52 (11 overs)

Middlesex won by 84 runs
Lord's, London
Umpires: David Constant & Alan Whitehead
Player of the match: Roland Butcher (Middlesex)

- Reserve day used. Sussex were 9/0 (1.4 overs) at the close of the first day's play.

28, 29 May 1986
(scorecard)

Northamptonshire; 233/8 (55 overs)	v	Worcestershire; 234/2 (52.2 overs)
Allan Lamb 71; Alan Pridgeon 2/43 (11 overs)		Graeme Hick 103*; Alan Walker 1/52 (11 overs)

Worcestershire won by 8 wickets
New Road, Worcester
Umpires: John Harris & David Shepherd
Player of the match: Graeme Hick (Worcestershire)

- Reserve day used. Worcestershire were 52/1 at the close of the first day's play.

=== Semi-finals ===
11, 12 June 1986
(scorecard)

Nottinghamshire; 189/8 (55 overs)	v	Middlesex; 193/5 (53.2 overs)
Derek Randall 65; John Emburey 4/22 (11 overs)		Wilf Slack 65; Kevin Cooper 1/22 (11 overs)

Middlesex won by 5 wickets
Lord's, London
Umpires: Jack Birkenshaw & John Hampshire
Player of the match: John Emburey (Middlesex)

- Reserve day used. Nottinghamshire were 189/8 (55 overs) at the close of the first day's play

11 June 1986
(scorecard)

Kent; 252/8 (55 overs)	v	Worcestershire; 241/7 (55 overs)
Chris Tavaré 68; John Inchmore 2/49 (11 overs)		Graeme Hick 72; Richard Ellison 2/49 (11 overs)

Kent won by 11 runs
New Road, Worcester
Umpires: Barrie Leadbeater & Barrie Meyer
Player of the match: Neil Taylor (Kent)

=== Final ===
12 July 1986
(scorecard)

Middlesex; 199/7 (55 overs)	v	Kent; 197/8 (55 overs)
Clive Radley 54; Richard Ellison 3/27 (11 overs)		Graham Cowdrey 58; Phil Edmonds 3/58 (11 overs)

Middlesex won by 2 runs
Lord's, London
Umpires: David Constant & David Shepherd
Player of the match: John Emburey (Middlesex)

== See also ==
Benson & Hedges Cup
