= Oxford and Cambridge Universities cricket team =

English cricket team

Combined Oxford and Cambridge Universities cricket teams were formed at intervals between 1839 and 1992, often playing against touring teams. Mostly the team consisted of students who were current members of either Cambridge University Cricket Club or Oxford University Cricket Club but there were four matches from 1874 to 1893 in which the Universities team was a Past and Present combination. The combined teams always held first-class status, unofficially at first and then officially from 1895.

== 19th century ==
The combined team's first match was against Marylebone Cricket Club (MCC) at Lord's in 1839, in which Edward Sayres took his only ten-wicket match haul, and in 1848 they played a game against Gentlemen of England at the same venue, in which William Hammersley took ten wickets.

== 20th century ==
The team later undertook overseas tours in the middle part of the twentieth century, but played only two first-class games outside Britain, both being at Sabina Park, during the tour of Jamaica in 1938. Kenneth Weekes made his first-class debut for Jamaica in the first of these, scoring 106 in the second innings.

After a thirty-year gap, the Oxford and Cambridge team returned to first-class cricket in 1968, with a match against the touring Australians, and for a quarter of a century thereafter the team had fairly regular matches against touring teams at either the University Parks in Oxford or Fenner's in Cambridge, but playing no other first-class games. The team's last match was in 1992, when they played the Pakistanis.

There was a similar combined team known as British Universities which played in the Benson & Hedges Cup, a limited overs competition, between 1975 and 1998. At first, this team was sometimes called Oxford and Cambridge Universities, or Oxbridge, but it was not first-class.

== See also ==
- List of Oxford and Cambridge Universities cricket team players

== Bibliography ==
- ACS (1981). A Guide to Important Cricket Matches Played in the British Isles 1709 – 1863. Nottingham: ACS.
- ACS (1982). A Guide to First-Class Cricket Matches Played in the British Isles. Nottingham: ACS.
- Birley, Derek (1999). A Social History of English Cricket. Aurum.
- Wisden Cricketers' Almanack, 27th edition, editor Charles F. Pardon, John Wisden & Co., 1890
- Wisden Cricketers' Almanack, 32nd edition, editor Sydney Pardon, John Wisden & Co., 1895
