= Cambridge University Cricket Club =

English university cricket team

Personnel
- Captain: Stan Norman (men); Pippa Kelly (women)
- Coach: Sam Rippington (men); Peter Laughlin (women)

Team information
- Founded: 1820; 206 years ago
- Home ground: Fenner's

History
- First-class debut: v. Cambridge Town Club in 1817; 209 years ago at Parker's Piece, Cambridge
- Official website: cucc.net

Cambridge University Cricket Club, established in 1820, is the representative cricket club for students of the University of Cambridge. The university played List A cricket in 1972 and 1974 only. It has not played top-level Twenty20 cricket.

With some 1,200 members, home matches are played at Fenner's. The club has three men's teams (Blues, Crusaders and the Colleges XI) and one women's team (from the incorporation of Cambridge University Women's Cricket Club (CUWCC) in 2000) which altogether play nearly 100 days of cricket each season. The inaugural University Match between Cambridge and Oxford University Cricket Club was played in 1827 and the match was the club's sole remaining first class fixture each season until 2020.

The club has also operated as part of the Cambridge University Centre of Cricketing Excellence (Cambridge UCCE) which included players from Cambridge University and Anglia Polytechnic University, now Anglia Ruskin University. This was re-branded as the Cambridge MCC University (Cambridge MCCU) prior to the 2010 season, when its governance was transferred from the England and Wales Cricket Board to MCC. Both male and female teams played in the British Universities & Colleges Sport competitions and the men also took part in the MCC Universities Championship and Twenty20 competitions. In 2020, the MCCU competitions were cancelled due to Coronavirus restrictions and funding from MCC ceased. The MCCU teams played in 2021 as UCCEs once more, but Cambridge UCCE did not continue after 2022. Cambridge University Cricket Club, without support from ARU, continues to compete in the BUCS National League against other UCCEs, with players selected only from Cambridge University.

The club also oversees and manages the annual inter-college 'Cuppers' cricket competition.

The earliest reference to cricket at the University of Cambridge is in 1710. A Cambridge University team played against an Eton College team in 1754 and 1755, although those were minor matches. It is not known whether the Eton teams were of present or past pupils. Cambridge University began an annual series against Cambridge Town Club, which evolved into the original Cambridgeshire County Cricket Club, on 30 May 1817.

All Cambridge teams play annual matches against Oxford as well as other matches throughout the Lent and Summer terms. The first team four-day University Match remained a top-class fixture until 2020, and alternates between being held at Fenner's and The Parks. The one-day matches for men and women are currently played at Arundel. The Crusaders play a three-day game against the Authentics as well as one-day and Twenty20 games.

== Cricket at the University of Cambridge ==
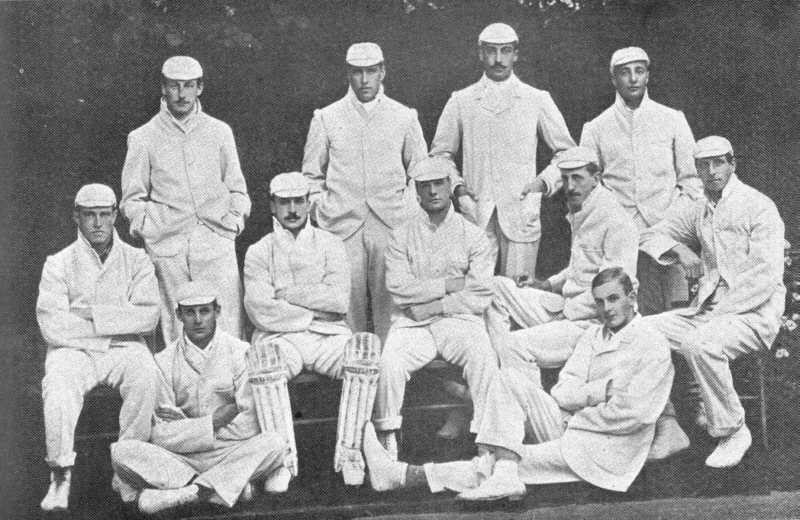
The cricket team of 1899

Players who represent Cambridge in the University Match against Oxford are awarded a "Blue", which recognises sporting achievement at the highest level whilst a student at the university. A "Blue" is awarded to anyone who plays for Cambridge in either fixture.

Those representing the (in recent years considered the Second XI) are eligible for a "Crusaders' Colour" if they represent the Crusaders against Oxford's Authentics. Despite a large winter training-squad, and many players representing the university over the summer months (up to 50 players from the training squad and college level), rarely are more than a total of 12 Blues and 12 Colours awarded. Women cricketers are awarded a Half-Blue for playing in the one-day match against Oxford and a discretionary full Blue if any of them meet the relevant criteria laid down by the Blues Committee.

Cricket is also played between the constituent colleges of Cambridge University. This currently takes the form of a cup competition 'Cuppers'. However, the colleges also play a range of their own friendly fixtures. Over the years, a number of independent student clubs have been formed such as Magpies, Chaffinches, Crusaders, Inexpressibles, Quidnuncs, Perambulators and Etceteras, to name a few and they have played fixtures against the colleges and other wandering sides.

== Recent history ==
In recent Oxford versus Cambridge University matches, the honours have been fairly even between the two universities. In 2010 Cambridge University played Oxford in three matches for the first time: Twenty20, 4-Day First-Class and the 1-Day Match at Lord's (colours are not awarded for the Twenty20 game).

The Cambridge Centre of Cricketing Excellence (UCCE) team played 27 matches between 2001 and 2009. Subsequently, as the Cambridge Marylebone Cricket Club University, three First Class fixtures were played each season until 2014 when this was reduced to two. In 2019, the ECB announced that the Cambridge games (among other university games) was set to lose first class status by 2021. The last matches involving Cambridge University as part of Cambridge UCCE or Cambridge UCCE Women were in 2022.

== Grounds ==
The three grounds that Cambridge University Cricket Club has used for home and List A matches since 1821 are listed below. Only the matches played at the ground by Cambridge University, Cambridge UCCE, and Cambridge MCCU are recorded in the table.

Name	Image	Location	First-class matches			List A matches			Refs
Name	Image	Location	First	Last	No. of matches	First	Last	No. of matches	Refs
University Ground		Barnwell	24 May 1821 v Cambridge Town Club	30 May 1830 v Cambridge Town Club	8	—	—	0	
Parker's Piece		Cambridge	27 May 1835 v Marylebone Cricket Club	13 May 1847 v Marylebone Cricket Club	13 (Note: The University played other matches on the ground as the away team both before and after 1835.)	—	—	0	
Fenner's		Cambridge	18 May 1848 v Marylebone Cricket Club	3 September 2020 v Oxford University	892 (Note: Other teams played 19 matches on the ground.)	6 May 1972 v Worcestershire	11 May 1974 v Essex	4	

== See also ==
- List of Cambridge University Cricket Club players
- List of Oxford and Cambridge Universities cricket team players
- List of Cambridge UCCE & MCCU players
- The University Match (cricket)
