= List of Old Tonbridgians =

This is a list of notable alumni of Tonbridge School.

== Academics and scientists ==
- Robert McNeill Alexander, Professor of Zoology at the University of Leeds
- Sir Derek Harold Richard Barton, chemist and Nobel Laureate
- William Thomas Clifford Beckett (1862–1956) brigadier-general in British Army and notable civil engineer
- Herbert Edward Douglas Blakiston, Vice-Chancellor of the University of Oxford (1917–1920)
- Roland Bond, locomotive engineer
- Henry Burton, physician and chemist
- Ian Bradley, writer, academic and theologian
- James Burton, Egyptologist
- Owen Chadwick, Vice Chancellor of University of Cambridge, Master of Selwyn Cambridge, Regius Professor of Modern History, Dixie Professor of Ecclesiastical History, Chancellor of University of Anglia, President of British Academy, and a Rugby Union international
- John George Children, British chemist, mineralogist and zoologist
- Alex Chui, current most-decorated IMO participant
- Homersham Cox (mathematician), mathematician
- Sir John Crofton, respiratory physician and expert on treatment of Tuberculosis
- David Emms, teacher and rugby union player
- Peter Fisher, personal physician to Her Majesty Queen Elizabeth II
- W. D. Hamilton, devisor of Red Queen Theory
- Norman Heatley, the man who, having been on the team of Oxford scientists which discovered penicillin, turned it into a usable medicine
- Norman Gerald Horner, physician and medical journalist
- John Wykeham Jacomb-Hood, British railway engineer and Major in the Engineer and Railway Staff Corps
- R. J. B. Knight, naval historian
- Tim Marrs, toxicologist
- Sir Arthur Marshall, aviation engineer
- Edward Nicholson, author and head of the Bodleian library
- Walter Fraser Oakeshott, Vice Chancellor of the University of Oxford
- Jack Ogden, archaeologist and historian focusing on the development of jewellery materials and techniques
- Carl Pantin, professor of Zoology, Cambridge University
- Colin Patterson, palaeontologist and reformer of the fossil record
- Sir David Randall Pye, mechanical engineer and Provost of University College London
- W. H. R. Rivers, Cambridge neurologist, psychologist, anthropologist and World War One psychiatrist
- Sir Anthony Seldon, historian, political commentator and educationalist (current Master of Wellington College)
- Claud Buchanan Ticehurst, ornithologist
- Ernest Basil Verney, pharmacologist and Fellow of the Royal Society
- Thomas Dewar Weldon philosopher
- Maurice Frank Wiles, Regius Professor Emeritus of Divinity at Oxford and one of the leading theologians of the Church of England
- E. T. C. Werner, diplomat and China scholar

== Actors, directors, producers and screenwriters ==
- Maurice Denham (1909–2002), prolific character actor, known for voicing all the animal characters in the animated feature Animal Farm and also for the part of Maigret in the 1970s radio production of that name
- Tristan Gemmill (born 1967), actor, known for playing Adam Trueman in the BBC medical drama Casualty
- Will Hislop, actor and comedian
- Ronald Howard (1918–1996) actor, son of Leslie Howard
- John Howlett (born 1942), screenwriter & film director, co-wrote the feature film If.... with fellow Tonbridge schoolmate David Sherwin
- Adrian Rawlins (born 1958), actor, known for playing James Potter in the Harry Potter film series
- Paul Rutman, producer and writer, including TV series Indian Summers, eight episodes of Vera and the Apple TV+ show Criminal Record
- Dan Stevens (born 1982), actor, known for playing Matthew Crawley in the ITV period drama Downton Abbey
- David Sherwin (born 1942), screenwriter, co-wrote the feature film If.... with fellow Tonbridge schoolmate John Howlett
- David Tomlinson (1917–2000), actor, known for playing George Banks in Mary Poppins
- Benjamin Whitrow (1937-2017), actor, known for playing Mr. Bennett in the 1995 mini-series Pride and Prejudice

== Armed forces ==
- Lieutenant General Sir Richard Anderson
- Clifford Thomason Beckett, major-general in British Army
- Richard Brandram, decorated WW2 army officer and married to Princess Katherine of Greece and Denmark
- Colonel Hamish de Bretton-Gordon, chemical weapons expert
- Sir Archibald Campbell, 1st Baronet, commanded the British forces in the First Anglo-Burmese War
- Rear Admiral David Cooke, submarine and defence procurement officer
- William Sholto Douglas, 1st Baron Douglas of Kirtleside, Commander-in-Chief of Fighter Command after the Battle of Britain
- Eric Stuart Dougall, recipient of the Victoria Cross, First World War
- Lieutenant General Sir Arthur Dowler
- Air Chief Marshal Sir William Elliot
- Peter Gardner (RAF officer), Battle of Britain pilot and WWII flying ace
- John Everard Gurdon, WW1 flying ace with 28 kills
- Rear Admiral Frederick Hervey, 4th Marquess of Bristol, nobleman, naval officer and Conservative politician
- John Holman, brigadier in British Army
- Squadron Leader Hilary Hood,Battle of Britain fighter pilot
- Edmund Ironside, 1st Baron Ironside, Chief of the Imperial General Staff
- Edmund Ironside, 2nd Baron Ironside
- Major-General Sir Millis Jefferis, developer of unusual weapons during WW2
- Harold Stephen Langhorne (1877–1878), brigadier-general in the British Army in the First World War
- James Archibald Dunboyne Langhorne (1893–1896), brigadier in the British Army
- Gyles Longley, awarded the Military Cross for actions in Italy
- Charles Mordaunt, 3rd Earl of Peterborough, a brilliant soldier and notorious eccentric who captured Barcelona in the war of Spanish Succession
- Lieutenant-Commander Harold Newgass, recipient of the George Cross
- Wing Commander Eric James Brindley Nicolson, Battle of Britain fighter pilot and recipient of the Victoria Cross
- Major Sandy Smith (British Army officer), awarded the Military Cross for action at Pegasus Bridge
- Admiral Sir William Sidney Smith, the British admiral of whom Napoleon Bonaparte said, "That man made me miss my destiny"
- Maurice Tandy, Royal Engineers officer and Director of the Survey of India
- Squadron Leader Trevor Sidney Wade, Battle of Britain fighter pilot and ace
- Air Chief Marshal Sir Andrew 'Sandy' Wilson, Former Air Member for Personnel and last C-in-C RAF Germany
- Wing Commander Edward Wolfe (RAF officer), Battle of Britain fighter pilot
- Robert Charles Zaehner, British academic, wartime SOE agent and post war MI6 agent

== Business ==
- Sir John Bond, former chairman of HSBC and current chairman of Vodafone
- Roy Brown, former chairman of GKN
- Gerald Corbett, businessman
- Sir Brian Garton Jenkins, chairman of Woolwich plc
- Sir David Kirch, businessman
- Bevil Mabey, chairman of Mabey Group
- Michael Marriott, head of the British stock exchange
- Alex Proud (born 1969), founder and CEO of The Proud Group
- Sir Tim Waterstone (born 1939), founder of Waterstones bookshops

== Church leaders ==
- William Alexander (bishop) (1824–1911) poet, theologian and Anglican Primate of All Ireland
- George Austen, clergyman and father of Jane Austen
- Harry Blackburne, Dean of Bristol
- Gerald Brooks, Anglican Bishop
- Philip Stanhope Dodd, Anglican clergyman
- Timothy Dudley-Smith, Bishop and hymn writer
- Charles Escreet, Archdeacon of Lewisham
- Edward Lewis Evans, Bishop of Barbados
- Andrew Graham, Bishop of Newcastle
- Sidney Faithorn Green, Ritualist clergyman
- John Halliburton, theologian
- Joseph Charles Hoare, an eminent Anglican priest in Hong Kong
- Bishop Frederick Ridgeway
- Arthur Tooth, Anglo-Catholic clergyman prosecuted for using ritualist liturgical practices
- Hugo Ferdinand de Waal, Principal of Ridley Hall, Cambridge and Bishop of Thetford
- Henry Russell Wakefield was an Anglican Bishop and author
- Geoffrey Warde, Anglican Bishop
- Kenneth Warner, Bishop of Edinburgh
- Cecil Wilson, Bishop of Melanesia

== Politicians ==
- Austen Albu, Labour MP
- Geoffrey Bing, Labour MP
- John Bowis, former Conservative MP and MEP, a Health Minister 1993-96 and a Transport Minister 1996-97
- Iain Coleman, Labour MP
- Charles Conybeare, radical Liberal politician
- Harold Cox, Liberal MP
- Sampson Gideon, later Eardley, 1st Baron Eardley, Jewish-born 18th century Tory MP, created a Baronet in 1759 while a schoolboy
- John Ganzoni, 1st Baron Belstead, Conservative MP
- Ben Gummer, Conservative MP for Ipswich
- Sir Reginald Hanson, 1st Baronet was Lord Mayor of London and a British Conservative Party politician.
- Sir Anthony Hart, Lord Chancellor of Ireland 1827-1830
- Thomas Herbert, 8th Earl of Pembroke, Lord Privy Seal
- Edward Brodie Hoare, British Conservative politician
- Sir Norman Hulbert, RAF officer and Conservative politician
- Nawab Mohammad Ismail Khan, (politician), signatory to the Indian Constitution
- Lord Mayhew of Twysden, Queen's Counsel, barrister and Conservative politician
- Jerome Mayhew, Conservative MP for Broadland
- Ralph Neville, Liberal Unionist politician
- Sydney Olivier, 1st Baron Olivier (1859–1943), colonial civil servant and Cabinet Minister
- Thomas Pelham, 1st Baron Pelham, aristocrat, Whig Party politician, father of two Prime Ministers
- Sir Julian Ridsdale, Conservative politician and intelligence officer
- George Smythe, 7th Viscount Strangford, Conservative politician
- Sir Peter Tapsell, Conservative politician, MP for Louth & Horncastle
- Wan Saiful Wan Jan, MP Tasek Gelugor, Penang, Malaysia. Parti Wawasan Negara Vice President
- Charles Wardle, Conservative politician

== Diplomats and civil servants ==
- Sir Sherard Cowper-Coles, diplomat
- Sir Henry Mortimer Durand diplomat, former Ambassador to the United States
- Sir Walter Egerton, colonial governor
- Sir Basil Engholm, civil servant
- Dominic Jermey, British Ambassador to Afghanistan
- Sir John Leahy, British Ambassador to South Africa
- Sir William Marwood, civil servant
- Henry Thoby Prinsep, English official of the Indian civil service
- Robert Rogers, Baron Lisvane, Clerk of the House of Commons
- Sir Leslie Rowan, civil servant
- Sir David Trench, Governor of Hong Kong (1964–1971)
- David Williamson, Baron Williamson of Horton, Secretary General of the European Commission
- Charles Whitworth, 1st Earl Whitworth, British Ambassador to Paris during the treaty of Amiens

== Entertainers and musicians ==
- Robert Ashfield, organist at Southwell Minster and Rochester Cathedral
- Bill Bruford, drummer for Yes, King Crimson and others
- Justin Chancellor, bassist, Tool
- Tom Chaplin, Keane, musician
- Julian Clifford, conductor
- Kit Hesketh-Harvey, musician
- Richard Hughes, musician with UK band Keane
- Dave Lawson, musician with progressive rock band Greenslade
- Joseph McManners, singer and actor (left in 2011)
- Tim Rice-Oxley, musician with UK band Keane
- King Palmer, composer
- Dominic Scott, musician, founding member of UK band Keane
- Andy Zaltzman, stand-up comedian

== Journalists and writers ==
- Andy Bell, journalist
- Fergus Butler-Gallie, vicar, columnist and author
- Mark Church, sports commentator
- Harry Cole, journalist
- Homersham Cox, author and county judge
- Rupert Croft-Cooke, author
- Alastair Down, horseracing journalist
- Albany Fonblanque, journalist
- E. M. Forster, novelist
- Frederick Forsyth, novelist
- Sidney Keyes, poet
- Nicholas Ostler, linguist
- Matthew Parker, author
- Christopher Reid, poet
- Vikram Seth, novelist
- Jonathan Street, novelist
- Arthur Watkyn, author and Secretary of the British Board of Film Censors
- Ken Wiwa, journalist and author. Son of Nigerian campaigner, Ken Saro-Wiwa.
- William Woodfall, (at the school in 1760), pioneer of the (then illegal) practice of reporting Parliamentary debates

== Miscellaneous ==
- William Adams, lawyer
- Khalid bin Sultan Al Qasimi, fashion designer
- Aleister Crowley, occultist, mystic, sexual revolutionary
- Ranulph Bacon, senior police officer
- Sir Herbert Baker, architect
- Murray Beauclerk, 14th Duke of St Albans
- Martin Beddoe, judge
- Sir Rupert de la Bère, 1st Baronet
- Decimus Burton, 19th century architect
- Hugh Cecil, 1920s society photographer
- Gerald Cock, British broadcasting executive
- Julius Cowdrey, musician, reality television personality
- Peter Fincham, Director of TV at ITV, former Controller of BBC One
- Harold Gilman, painter
- Adrian Greenwood, historian and art dealer
- Sir Robert Heath, Attorney-General under King Charles I
- Chris Hollins - BBC Breakfast sports presenter, son of footballer John Hollins
- Sir Anthony Hollis, High Court judge
- William Hughes-Hughes, stamp-collector
- George Percy Jacomb-Hood, artist
- Vikram Jayanti, documentary film maker
- Thomas Noyes Lewis, Christian artist
- Sir Guy Newey, Lord Justice of Appeal.
- Sir John Nott-Bower, Commissioner of Police of the Metropolis
- Jasper Rootham, civil servant, soldier, central banker, merchant banker, writer and poet
- Tim Severin, explorer
- Colin Smith, judge
- George Smythe, 7th Viscount Strangford
- Paul Tanqueray - society photographer
- Francis Thynne, herald (his father was Chaucer's editor, and Master of the Household for Henry VIII)
- David Trubridge, furniture designer
- Anthony Whishaw, Royal Academician
- Dr. Edward Whitehead Reid, surgeon and aviator
- Roger Yates, Organ builder
- Keith Young, hospital and school sanatoria architect

== Sportsmen ==
- John Abercrombie, cricketer
- David Aers, cricketer
- Robert Airey, cricketer
- William Albertini (1913–1994), English cricketer
- Mark Allbrook, cricketer and Head at Bloxham School
- Jonathan Arscott, cricketer and schoolmaster
- Randolph Aston, rugby union international who represented England
- Matthew Banes, cricketer
- Jack Barley, cricketer
- James Body, rugby union international who represented England
- Thomas Bourdillon, cricketer
- Frederick Capron, cricketer
- William Cave, England rugby union player
- Sir Colin Cowdrey, Baron Cowdrey of Tonbridge (1932–2000), Kent CCC and England cricketer and cricket administrator
- C. S. Cowdrey (born 1957), Kent Glamorgan and England cricketer and broadcaster
- Fabian Cowdrey, Kent cricketer
- G. R. Cowdrey (born 1964), Kent cricketer
- Tom Crawford, cricketer
- Zak Crawley, Kent and England cricketer
- John Dale, cricketer
- Charles Daniel-Tyssen, cricketer
- Jack Davies, cricketer who bowled Sir Donald Bradman out for a duck
- David Day, cricketer
- John Dew, cricketer
- Ben Earl, Saracens and England Rugby Union player
- Tom Elliott, cricketer
- Charles Ellison, cricketer
- Richard Ellison (born 1959), Kent CCC and England cricketer
- Edward Estridge, cricketer
- Thomas Francis, cricketer
- Peter Graham, cricketer
- Alexander Grimes, cricketer
- Johnny Hammond, rugby player
- Lionel Hedges, cricketer
- Anthony Henniker-Gotley, England rugby union captain
- Alexander Hore, cricketer
- Mark Hickson, cricketer
- John Holman, first-class cricketer
- Maurice Holmes, cricketer
- C. W. H. Howard (born 1904), Middlesex CCC cricketer
- Frederick Hutchings, county cricketer
- Kenneth Hutchings, England cricketer and Wisden cricketer of the year
- William Hutchings, county cricketer
- Edward Hyde, Cambridge sportsman
- Nick Kemp, county cricketer
- Francis Luscombe (1849–1926), rugby union international who represented England and was on the first Rugby Football Union committee
- David Marques, England and British Lions rugby player and member of 1964 America's Cup challenger team aboard the yacht Sovereign.
- James Mason (1876–1938), cricketer
- Tom May, rugby union player, Newcastle Falcons and England
- Richard O'Grady, cricketer
- Marcus O'Riordan, cricketer
- Frank Orr, cricketer
- Jamie Parker, cricketer
- Frank Pennink, Walker Cup golfer and golf course architect
- Toby Pettman, cricketer
- Charles Pillman, England Rugby player
- Roger Prideaux, cricketer
- James Pyemont, cricketer
- Ben Ransom, Rugby union player for Saracens
- Henry Reade, cricketer
- Henry Richardson, cricketer
- Septimus Ridsdale, cricketer
- James Rowe, cricketer
- Ronald Rutter, cricketer
- George Arbuthnot Scott, cricketer
- Walter Slade, (1854–1919), former world amateur record holder for the mile
- Noel Sherwell, cricketer
- James Short (rugby union), Rugby union player for Saracens.
- Leonard Shuter, cricketer
- Colin Smith, cricketer
- E. T. Smith (born 1977), Middlesex CCC, Kent and England cricketer
- John Thompson, cricketer
- Maurice Tandy, Irish cricketer
- David Toft, cricketer
- John Vigurs, Olympic rower
- John Vernon (1922–1994), first-class cricketer and Royal Navy sailor
- Luke Wallace, Rugby player for Harlequins RFC
- Chris Walsh, cricketer
- Alfred Wilkins, cricketer
