= Charles Rowe (cricketer) =

Hong Kong cricketer

Personal information
- Full name: Charles James Castell Rowe
- Born: 27 November 1951 (age 74); Hong Kong
- Batting: Right-handed
- Bowling: Right-arm off break
- Relatives: James Rowe (son); Antony Rowe (uncle)

International information
- National side: Hong Kong

Domestic team information
- Years: Team
- 1974–1981: Kent
- 1982–1984: Glamorgan

Career statistics
Competition	First-class	List A
Matches	175	118
Runs scored	6,173	1,563
Batting average	26.38	20.29
100s/50s	6/30	0/7
Top score	147*	81
Balls bowled	10,056	601
Wickets	128	18
Bowling average	40.05	29.33
5 wickets in innings	3	1
10 wickets in match	1	0
Best bowling	6/46	5/32
Catches/stumpings	63/–	25/–
- Source: CricInfo, 23 January 2011

Charles James Castell Rowe (born 27 November 1951) is a former first-class cricketer who played for Kent County Cricket Club and Glamorgan County Cricket Club between 1974 and 1984. Rowe was born in Hong Kong and played three times for the Hong Kong national cricket team. He was educated at The King's School, Canterbury.

== Cricketing career ==
Rowe made his first appearances for the Kent Second XI in 1969, before going on to make his first-class cricket debut for the county against Surrey in May 1974. Initially an all-rounder who batted in the middle order, Rowe played regularly for Kent throughout the remainder of the 1970s. He scored 1,065 runs in the 1978 season, including 980 in the County Championship as Kent won the competition, having been joint champions the previous season. During 1978 he was promoted to open the batting for the county, a role which he had not played before.

Rowe played 122 first-class matches and made 78 List A cricket appearances for Kent. He played in the Kent sides which won the 1976 and 1978 Benson & Hedges Cups and the 1976 John Player League. He was capped by Kent in 1977.

Rowe took 128 first-class wickets during his career, bowling as an "occasional" off-spinner. He took 10 wickets in a match once and five wickets in an innings three times, with best bowling figures of 6/46. Rowe is ambidextrous and on one occasion he bowled a single left-arm orthodox delivery to Sussex's tailender Chris Waller, taking his wicket with the only left-arm delivery of his career.

=== Glamorgan ===
Rowe left Kent at the end of the 1981 season and moved to Glamorgan County Cricket Club. He played there for three seasons, scoring 1,071 runs in his first season with the county, and was awarded his Glamorgan cap in 1983, making 53 first-class and 41 List A appearances for the county. He retired from cricket at the end of the 1984 season.

=== Hong Kong ===
Rowe made three appearances for the Hong Kong national cricket team in the 1970/71 season. He toured what was then Ceylon with the Hong Kong side before playing in one Interport match against Singapore.

== Later life and family ==
After retiring, Rowe moved into the City of London in 1984, working in equity sales initially with Rowe and Pitman founded by his grandfather in 1895 and now part of S. G. Warburg & Co. He finished his financial career with Matrix Group in 2010. In November 2016, Rowe was appointed as President of Kent County Cricket Club for the 2017 season, succeeding Lady Kingsdown in the role.

Rowe's son, James, played for the Kent Second XI and made three first-class appearances for Durham University Centre of Cricketing Excellence and a single List A appearances for the Kent Cricket Board. His father, George who worked for the Colonial Secretariat in Hong Kong, had also represented Hong Kong in 1959. His uncle, Antony Rowe represented Great Britain in rowing at the 1948 Olympic Games in London.
