= M. M. McCabe =

British professor of ancient philosophy (born 1948)

M. M. McCabe FBA
- Born: 18 December 1948 (age 77)
- Spouse: Martin Beddoe

Academic background
- Education: Newnham College, Cambridge
- Thesis: Plato's Theory of Punishment and Its Antecedents
- Influences: Plato; Socrates

Academic work
- Discipline: Philosophy
- Sub-discipline: Ancient philosophy; moral philosophy; philosophical logic
- Institutions: New Hall, Cambridge; King's College, London

Mary Margaret Anne McCabe FBA (born 18 December 1948), published as M. M. McCabe and before 1990 as M. M. Mackenzie, is emerita professor of ancient philosophy at King's College London. She has written books on Plato and other ancient philosophers, including the pre-Socratics, Socrates and Aristotle.

== Early life ==
McCabe was educated at Oxford High School for Girls, and then studied at Newnham College, Cambridge, taking her Bachelor of Arts degree in 1970 and her Doctor of Philosophy degree in 1977 in classics. Her doctoral thesis, Plato's Theory of Punishment and Its Antecedents, formed the basis of her first book, Plato on Punishment, published in 1981.

== Academic career ==
From 1981 to 1990 McCabe was Fellow in Classics at New Hall, University of Cambridge. She joined King's College London in 1990 and retired from her chair in Ancient Philosophy in 2014. She is now Keeling Scholar and Honorary Professor in Philosophy at University College London, and a Bye-Fellow of Newnham College, Cambridge.

In 2017 McCabe gave the Sather Lectures at the University of California, Berkeley, on the subject of 'Seeing and Saying: Plato on Virtue and Knowledge'.

McCabe was president of the British Philosophical Association from 2009 to 2012, and president of the Mind Association in 2016–2017.

In July 2017, McCabe was elected a Fellow of the British Academy (FBA), the United Kingdom's national academy for the humanities and social sciences.

== Selected works ==
=== Books ===
- Plato on Punishment (1981)
- Plato's Individuals (1994)
- Plato and His Predecessors: The Dramatisation of Reason (2007)
- Platonic Conversations (2015)

=== Edited volumes ===
- Form and Argument in Late Plato (2000), co-edited with Christopher Gill
- Perspectives on Perception: A Collection of Essays, (2007) co-edited with Mark Textor
- Aristotle and the Stoics Reading Plato (2010), co-edited with Verity Harte, R. W. Sharples and Anne Sheppard

=== Articles and book chapters ===
- 'Silencing the Sophists: The Drama of Plato's Euthydemus' (1998), Proceedings of the Boston Area Colloquium of Ancient Philosophy, Vol. 14, pp. 139–68
- 'Looking inside Charmides' Cloak' (2007), in Maieusis, ed. Dominic Scott, Oxford University Press, pp. 1–19
- 'Escaping One's Own Notice Knowing: Meno's Paradox Again' (2009), in Proceedings of the Aristotelian Society. Vol. 109, 1, pp. 233–256
- 'The Stoic Sage in the Original Position' (2013), in Politeia in Greek and Roman Philosophy, ed. Verity Harte and Melissa Lane, pp. 251–274
- 'The Unity of Virtue: Plato's Models of Philosophy' (2016), Aristotelian Society Supplementary Volume 90 (1), pp. 1–25

Professional and academic associations
Preceded by Brad Hooker	President of the British Philosophical Association; 2009–2012	Succeeded by Robert Stern
Preceded by Catherine Wilson	President of the Mind Association; 2016–2017	Succeeded by Roger Crisp
