= Martin Beddoe =

British judge

His Honour Judge Martin Beddoe

Circuit judge
- Incumbent
- Assumed office 2007
- Appointed by: Elizabeth II

Crown Court Recorder
- In office 2002–2007

Standing Counsel to HM Revenue and Customs
- In office 2005–2007

Personal details
- Born: Martin William Denton Beddoe; 7 July 1955 (age 71) Abyad, Egypt
- Spouse: Mary Margaret Anne McCabe
- Children: Poppy
- Parent(s): Lieutenant Colonel Arthur Beddoe, Jane Beddoe
- Education: Tonbridge School
- Alma mater: BA Hons, Peterhouse, Cambridge
- Occupation: Judge, member of the Parole Board of England & Wales
- Known for: Presiding over high profile criminal cases

Martin William Denton Beddoe (born 7 July 1955) is a British judge known for having presided over many high-profile criminal cases. He is a former Crown Court Recorder, member of the Parole Board of England and Wales and a tutor judge of the Judicial College. In March 2013, he was one of the judges appointed to hear an inquest into the death of Olaseni Lewis.

== Early life ==
Beddoe came from a military family. He was born in Abyad, Egypt, where his father, World War II veteran Lieutenant Colonel Arthur Beddoe was serving at the time of his birth. His father had a very distinguished military career, and before his posting to Egypt, he was an infantry battalion commanding officer in the Welsh Regiment during the Second World War. Judge Beddoe takes pride in his Welsh heritage.

== Career at the Bar ==
Beddoe was educated at Tonbridge School and Peterhouse, Cambridge. He was called to the bar as a member of Gray's Inn in 1979 and thereafter practised as a barrister at 36 Bedford Row chambers where he practised from 1980 specialising in prosecution work, including prosecution of several cases of fraud, tax evasion, organised crime and murder, until 2005, when he was appointed Standing Counsel to the Revenue and Customs Prosecutions Office. He served in that capacity until December 2007, when he was appointed circuit judge.

=== Standing Counsel to HMRC ===
Beddoe served as a Standing Counsel to the Revenue and Customs Prosecutions Office for 3 years, until December 2007, dealing with numerous high-level drug importations and diversion cases, including some of the largest fraud prosecutions in the country such as the largest diversion fraud ever prosecuted at the time.

=== Prosecutor ===
Beddoe was a senior prosecutor in Peterborough Crown Court, Cambridgeshire. Throughout his career he successfully prosecuted many criminal cases including prosecution of a fraudster who was found guilty of involvement in a £1.5 million fraud in 2002, and a solicitor who plead guilty to stealing £350,000 in fees from clients in 2005. Solicitor Christopher McChrystal was arrested in October 2004 after the Law Society referred his case to the police. McChrystal was subsequently struck off after Lincoln Crown Court's finding that he used the clients' money to make an investment into his business. In 2003, Beddoe was a senior prosecutor in court cases resulting from Operation Harrier, a clean-up operation which has declared all-out war against Class A drugs in Peterborough, Cambridgeshire.

=== Defence counsel ===
Beddoe has defended at the criminal bar in drug cases, fraud, homicide and other serious crime. He also dealt with Courts Martial, Inquests and Public Enquiries. In 2005, he successfully defended Jason Smith, British soldier who served eight years in the British Army. The court heard that Smith's successful Army career was halted prematurely due to a back injury, and he had struggled to come to terms with it. In March 2005, as a result of his post-traumatic stress disorder, Smith had carried out a raid of a petrol station in Northampton at knife-point, but later dropped £45 in cash as the owner and several villagers gave chase. Sentencing Jason Smith to a two-year suspended sentence, Judge Nigel Daly told him:

It is the first time you have been in court and you are of previous good character and here you are in relation to a very serious offence. You had considerable problems with your finances and then suffered a reactive depression brought on by the spiralling debts.

== Judicial career ==
As a judge, Beddoe has presided over many high-profile criminal cases, including trial of BAFTA nominated film producers who used Film Tax Credit to claim back inflated cash from the Treasury.

=== Judicial appointments ===
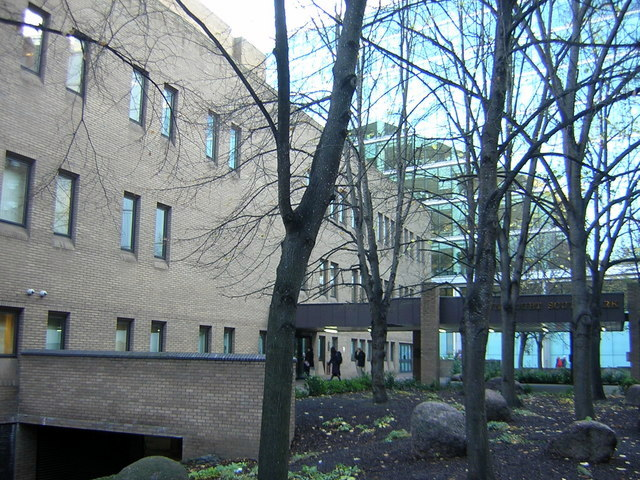
In 2007 Beddoe became the Resident Judge on the South Eastern Circuit based at Southwark Crown Court

Beddoe was a Recorder of the Crown Court from 2002 until 2007, when he was appointed a Senior Circuit Judge, becoming the Resident Judge on the South Eastern Circuit based at Southwark Crown Court.

=== Notable cases ===
In 2017, Judge Beddoe presided over the case of Ricardo McFarlane, 30-year-old Muslim convert charged with anti-social behaviour after preaching Sharia law in Oxford Street and two other London venues, who declined to stand up in court on religious grounds. McFarlane allegedly breached the terms of an antisocial behaviour order barring him from addressing members of the public to promote sharia law. At the hearing in Southwark Crown Court, Judge Beddoe noticed that McFarlane did not stand when he entered the room. McFarlane's defence barrister commented:

"Because of his religious belief he believes there is only one person who he should bow to."

To which Judge Beddoe responded:

"That is as may be, but this isn't a court of religion, this is a secular court and it expects to be treated with respect. That isn't in breach of any religious principles I'm aware of."

McFarlane then proceeded to stand for Judge Beddoe while he was speaking and during the rest of the hearing.

== Charity ==
In May 2017, Judge Beddoe was a lead walker at the London Legal Walk organised by London Legal Support Trust, which was designed to bring together leading criminal practitioners to raises funds for charities that provide life changing legal advice and representation to those in need. It was attended by leading criminal practitioners and professionals working in the criminal justice system, including Lord Thomas, the Lord Chief Justice, Nicholas Hilliard QC, Recorder of London, and Lord Igor Judge, former Lord Chief Justice of England and Wales. In June 2006, Beddoe cycled in the London to Brighton British Heart Foundation cycle rally to raise money in memory of a member of his former chambers, Paul Morgan, who died in 2005 of heart disease at the age of 50.

== Personal life ==
Beddoe is married to philosopher Mary Margaret Anne McCabe. A fitness enthusiast, he cycles a lot and is a keen golfer who served as a club captain of Old Tonbridgian Golfing Society.

== See also ==
- List of Old Tonbridgians
- Judiciary of England and Wales
