= Michael Marriott (economist) =

British businessman

Richard Michael Harris Marriott
- Born: 1926
- Died: 11 December 1975 (aged 48–49)
- Education: Tonbridge School
- Occupations: Head of the London Stock Exchange, Master of the Skinners Company, President of the FESE.

Richard Michael Harris Marriott (1926–1975) was a British public figure and economist, and a former head of the London Stock Exchange.

== Career ==
In 1975, Michael Marriott was Chairman of the London Stock Exchange, Master of the Skinners Company, and President of the FESE. He was the youngest master of the Skinners Company but also was one of the few to die whilst in office. He was also the youngest Chairman of the London Stock Exchange since the Second World War. He died of a heart attack in 1975 aged 49 whilst holding all three of these positions.

== Personal life ==
Michael Marriott was born in 1926, Bromley, England. On his mother's side he was the nephew of cricketers: Jack Mason, James Mason (cricketer), and Charles Mason. He was a distant cousin of Rugby Union player and England Captain Charles Marriott. Michael Marriott was an Old Tonbridgian (went to Tonbridge School) who have subsequently named one of the school playing fields after him. His youngest son is the actor Tim Marriott of Brittas Empire Fame.
