= James Rowe =

James Rowe may refer to:

- James G. Rowe Sr. (1857–1929), American jockey and horse trainer
- James G. Rowe Jr. (1889–1931), American horse trainer, son of the above
- James H. Rowe (1909–1984), American Democratic political strategist
- James N. Rowe (1938–1989), U.S. Army officer
- James Rowe (cricketer) (born 1979), English cricketer
- James Rowe (footballer, born 1983), English association football player and manager
- James Rowe (American football) (born 1986), American football coach
- James Rowe (footballer, born 1991), English association footballer
- James Rowe (Australian footballer) (born 1999), Australian rules footballer for Adelaide

== See also ==
- Jamie Rowe (born 1970), American Christian rock singer and guitarist
- James Roe (disambiguation)
- Albert Rowe (physicist) (1898–1976); British physicist, defence scientist, and academic, also known as Jimmy Rowe
