= Stephen Wright (cricketer, born 1952) =

English cricketer and surgeon

Personal information
- Full name: Stephen Wright
- Born: 4 February 1952 (age 74); Muswell Hill, Middlesex, England
- Batting: Right-handed

Domestic team information
- Years: Team
- 1973–1974: Cambridge University

Career statistics
Competition	First-class	List A
Matches	10	1
Runs scored	277	0
Batting average	14.57	0.00
100s/50s	0/0	0/0
Top score	41	0
Catches/stumpings	2/–	0/–
- Source: Cricinfo, 15 January 2022

Stephen Wright (born 4 February 1952) is an English former first-class cricketer.

Wright was born at Muswell Hill in February 1952 and later studied at Emmanuel College at the University of Cambridge. While studying at Cambridge, he played first-class cricket for Cambridge University Cricket Club in 1973, making ten appearances, which included playing that seasons University Match against Oxford. Playing as a batsman who was utilised as both an opening and middle order batsman in the Cambridge side, he scored 277 runs at an average of 14.57, with a highest score of 41. Wright played for Cambridge the following season, making a single List A one-day appearance against Sussex at Hove in the Benson & Hedges Cup; batting in the middle order, he was dismissed by Chris Waller for 0.
