= Chris Waller =

Chris Waller may refer to:

- Chris Waller (gymnast) (born 1968), American gymnast
- Chris Waller (cricketer) (born 1948), English cricketer
- Chris Waller (actor), British actor
- Chris Waller (horse trainer), (born 1973), New Zealand born champion thoroughbred horse trainer
