= Colin Milner Smith =

English cricketer, barrister, and judge (1936–2020)

Personal information
- Full name: Colin Milner Smith
- Born: 2 November 1936; Mottingham, Kent, England
- Died: 10 July 2020 (aged 83); Teddington, London, England
- Batting: Right-handed
- Role: Wicket-keeper
- Relatives: Martin Milner Smith (brother)

Domestic team information
- Years: Team
- 1958: Oxford University

Career statistics
Competition	First-class
Matches	1
Runs scored	16
Batting average	8.00
100s/50s	–/–
Top score	12
Catches/stumpings	1/1
- Source: Cricinfo, 14 July 2020

Colin Milner Smith QC (2 November 1936 – 10 July 2020) was an English judge and first-class cricketer.

The son of Alan Milner Smith and Vera Ivy (née Cannon), he was born at Mottingham in November 1936. He was educated at Tonbridge School and spent two years in National Service with the Royal Marines before going up to Brasenose College, Oxford.

While studying at Oxford, he made a single appearance in first-class cricket as a wicket-keeper for Oxford University against Sussex at Oxford in 1958. Batting twice in the match, he was dismissed for 12 runs by Ted James in the Oxford first innings, while in their second innings he was dismissed for 4 runs by the same bowler. He continued to play cricket past the age of 70, representing teams such as Old Tonbridgians, Yellowhammers, Band of Brothers, Limpsfield CC. His younger brother, Martin Milner Smith, was also a first-class cricketer.

After graduating from Oxford, Smith attended University of Chicago Law School. He was called to the bar as a barrister with Gray's Inn in 1962, and was appointed Queen's Counsel in April 1985, working in commercial law. He served as a circuit judge from 1991 to 2009 on the South Eastern Circuit. Smith also published a number of books on laws surrounding gambling in the United Kingdom.

He married Moira Braybrooke in 1979 and they had two children. He died on 10 July 2020 at the age of 83.
