= James Roe =

James Roe may refer to:

- James Roe (Irish politician), Member of Parliament for Cashel, 1832–1834
- James Elphinstone Roe (1818–1897), Australian convict, educator and journalist
- James A. Roe (1896–1967), U.S. Representative from New York
- Jimmy Roe (1908–1999), American soccer player
- James M. Roe (born 1943), American amateur astronomer
- James Roe (American football) (born 1973), Arena Football League player
- James Roe (rower) (born 1988), British adaptive rower
- James Roe (racing driver) (born 1998), Irish racing driver

== See also ==
- James Rowe (disambiguation)
