= Roy Brown (businessman) =

British businessman (1946–2024)

Roy Drysdale Brown, FIMechE, FIET (4 December 1946 – 28 November 2024) was a British engineer and business executive, who served as chairman of the international engineering conglomerate GKN from 2004 until 2012.

== Life and career ==
Brown attended the independent Tonbridge School. He went to University College London on a GEC scholarship where he gained a BSc in Mechanical Engineering.

He worked for Unilever from 1974 to 2001, and later became chairman of the Scottish telecommunications company Thus.

Brown joined GKN as a non-executive director in 1996 and became the company's chairman in May 2004. He was replaced by Michael Turner in May 2012.

Brown married Carol Wallace in 1978 and they had two sons. He became a Fellow of the Institution of Mechanical Engineers in 1983, and a Fellow of the IEE (now IET) in 1990.

Brown died on 28 November 2024, at the age of 77.

== See also ==
- Aerospace industry in the United Kingdom
- GKN

Business positions
Preceded by David Lees	Chairman of GKN; 2004 – 2012	Succeeded by Mike Turner
