= Paul Parker (cricketer) =

English cricketer and schoolmaster

Personal information
- Full name: Paul William Giles Parker
- Born: 15 January 1956 (age 70); Bulawayo, Southern Rhodesia
- Nickname: Porky, Polly
- Batting: Right-handed
- Relatives: Jamie Parker (son)

International information
- National side: England
- Only Test (cap 492): 27 August 1981 v Australia

Domestic team information
- Years: Team
- 1976–1978: Cambridge University
- 1976–1991: Sussex
- 1980/81: Natal
- 1992–1993: Durham

Career statistics
Competition	Test	FC	LA
Matches	1	371	341
Runs scored	13	19,419	8,606
Batting average	6.50	35.05	30.51
100s/50s	0/0	47/89	6/58
Top score	13	215	121*
Balls bowled	–	1,111	59
Wickets	–	11	5
Bowling average	–	69.90	12.20
5 wickets in innings	–	0	0
10 wickets in match	–	0	0
Best bowling	–	2/21	2/3
Catches/stumpings	0/–	257/–	129/–
- Source: Cricinfo, 19 November 2022

Paul William Giles Parker (born 15 January 1956) is an English schoolmaster and former cricketer, who played in one Test match in 1981.

== Life and career ==
He was educated at Collyer's School, Horsham, and St Catharine's College, Cambridge, where he was awarded a Master's degree and earned three blues. As a first-class cricketer, he represented Cambridge University, Durham and Sussex (whom he captained between 1988 and 1991) in 371 first-class and 341 List A matches between 1976 and 1993. With Sussex he won the Gillette Cup in 1978 and the NatWest Trophy in 1986, and was man of the match in the final of the former, and top scorer in the final in the latter.

He was a stylish middle-order batsman, who was considered unlucky to be limited to a solitary Test at the Oval against Australia. Light and quick on his feet, he was particularly strong against spin, and his quick running between the wickets made him a fast accumulator in the one day game. An outstanding cover fielder, he ranked alongside Derek Randall and David Gower as the finest of his day.

After four years of captaincy at Sussex, he joined Durham's initial foray into the first-class game.

The son of a sports journalist, John Parker, he taught Classics and Modern Languages at Tonbridge School in Kent, and was the housemaster of Hill Side. His son, Jamie, also played first-class cricket.

Sporting positions
Preceded by Ian Gould	Sussex county cricket captain 1988–1991	Succeeded by Alan Wells
