= David Toft =

English cricketer

Personal information
- Full name: David Penn Toft
- Born: 1 March 1945 (age 81); Tunbridge Wells, Kent, England
- Batting: Right-handed

Domestic team information
- Years: Team
- 1965–1967: Oxford University

Career statistics
| Competition | First-class |
|---|---|
| Matches | 27 |
| Runs scored | 1,222 |
| Batting average | 27.77 |
| 100s/50s | 1/6 |
| Top score | 145 |
| Catches/stumpings | 10/– |
- Source: Cricinfo, 7 April 2020

David Penn Toft (born 1 March 1945) is an English former first-class cricketer.

Toft was born at Tunbridge Wells in March 1945. He was educated at Tonbridge School, before going up to University College, Oxford. While studying at Oxford, he played first-class cricket for Oxford University, making his debut against Northamptonshire at Oxford in 1965. He played first-class cricket for Oxford until 1967, making 27 appearances. In his 27 first-class matches, Toft scored 1,222 runs at an average of 27.77 and a high score of 145. This score, which was his only first-class century, came opening the batting against Cambridge University in The University Match of 1967, which was also his final appearance in first-class cricket.
