= Thomas Noyes Lewis =

British painter and illustrator (1862–1946)

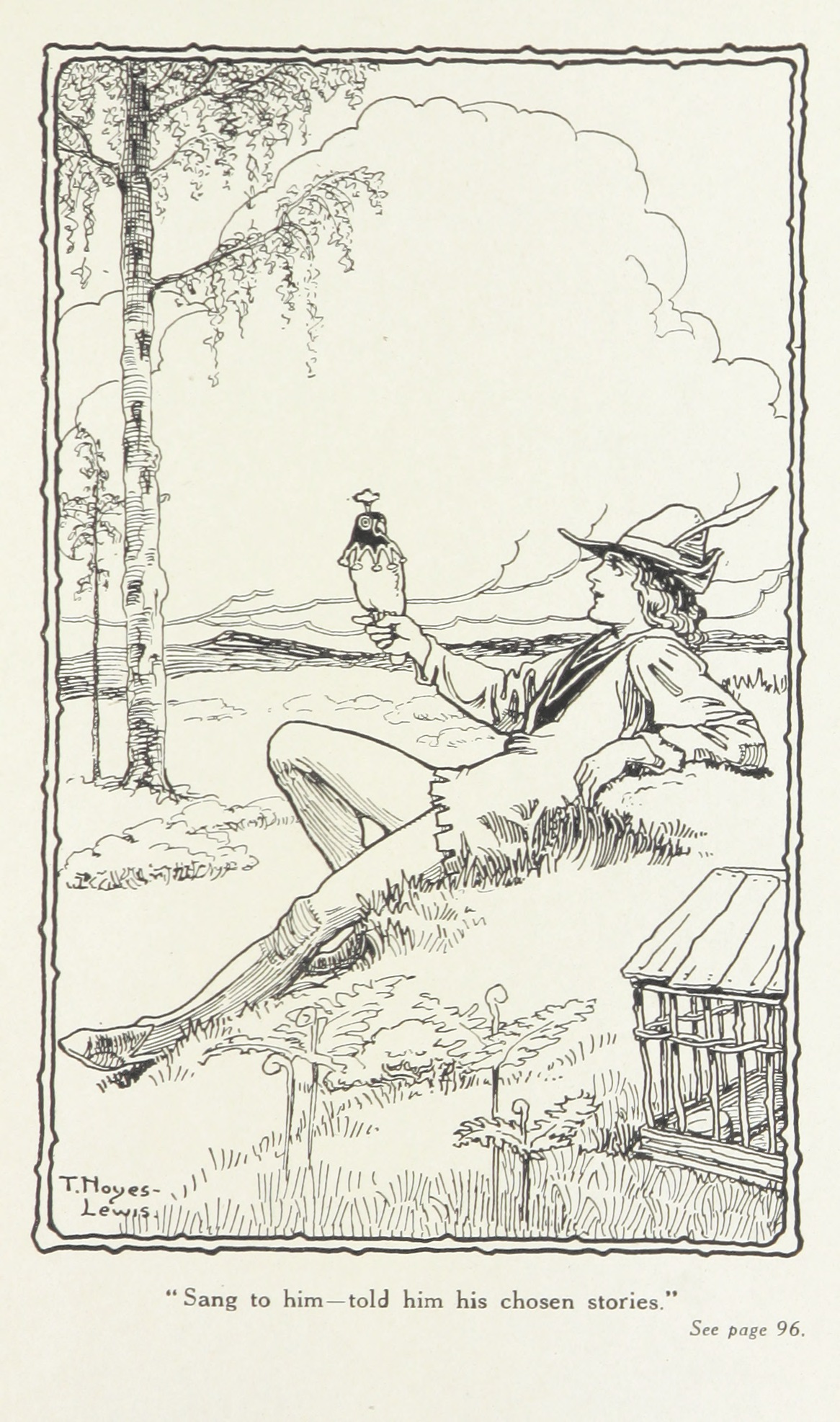
The Monarch of the Fenland and Other Poems with illustrations by T Noyes-Lewis

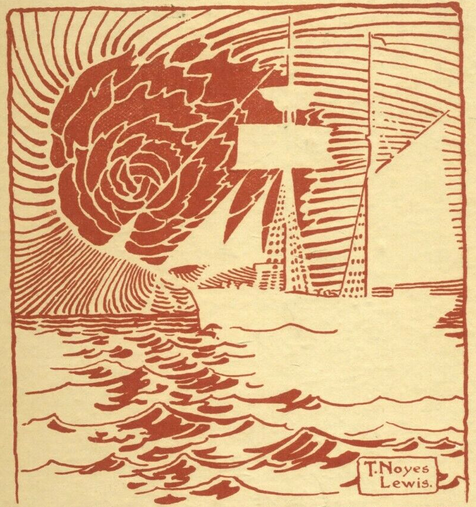
The cover art of Arthur Machen's 1915 book "The Great Return," by Thomas Noyes-Lewis.

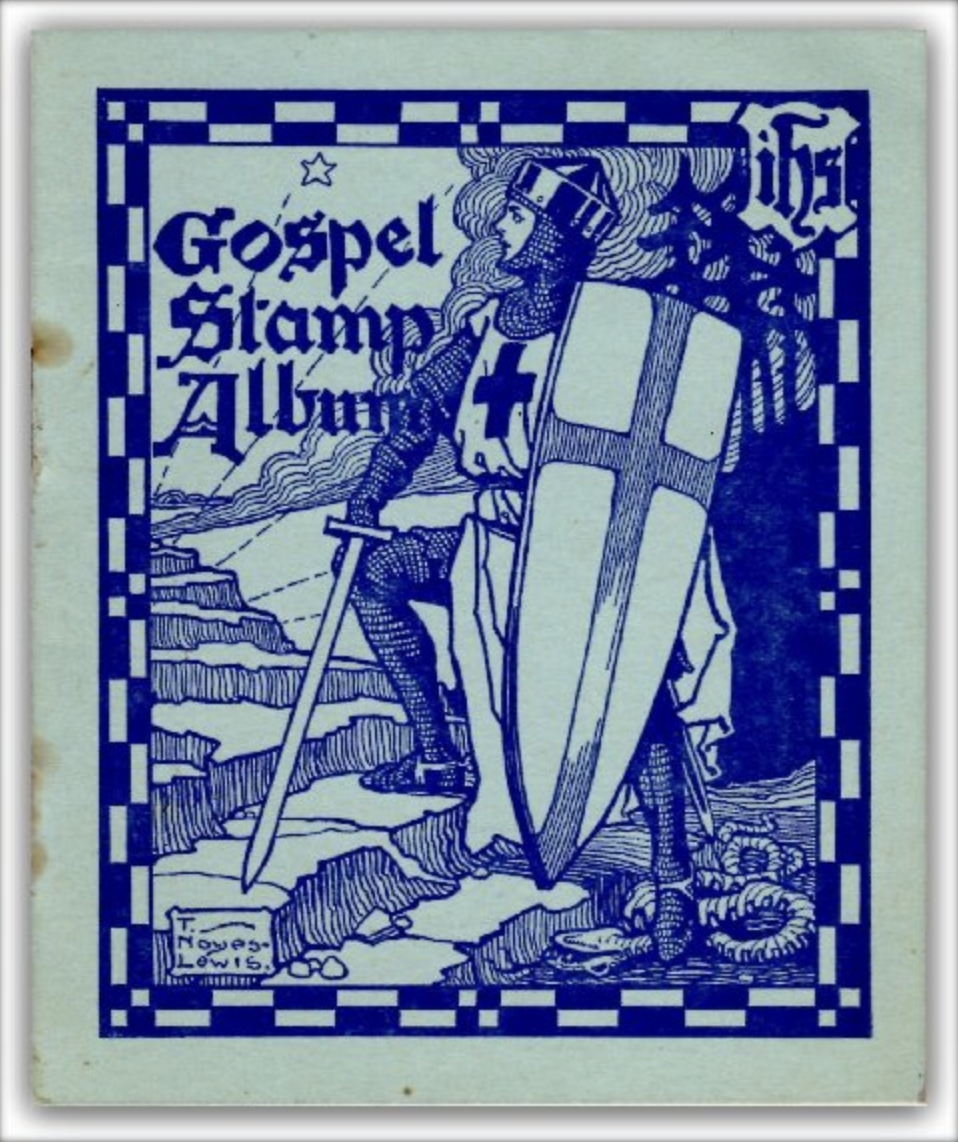
Gospel Stamp Album cover by T. Noyes-Lewis

Thomas Noyes Lewis (15 March 1862, Sulham, Berkshire – 11 September 1946 Belmont, Sutton) was a British painter and illustrator. He was most noted for his Christian illustrations, many of them accompanying publications from the Faith Press.

== Personal life ==
In 1859, three years before he was born, Lewis’ s father – Thomas Noyes Lewis (1829–84) – petitioned for bankruptcy. The young Lewis was educated at the Tonbridge School and did not go to university. He had two brothers named George and Arthur Wellesley who also attended Tonbridge School.

Thomas Noyes Lewis married Mary Priscilla Horsley with whom he had one son also called Thomas Noyes Lewis. He was a parishioner of All Saints Church, Benhilton.

== Career ==
His earliest commercial activity was illustrating works by E.F. Benson (including The Valkyries), and Uncle Tom’s Cabin, as well as children’s periodicals. He illustrated a series of children’s books entitled Dean’s Chocolate Surprise Books which were sold in foil and paper wrappers with the appearance of chocolate bars. The Victoria and Albert Museum displays an advertising poster from his early career.

Over several decades Lewis produced a great variety of religious illustrations for a range of media as varied as stained glass, lantern slides, cigarette cards, postcards, children’s jigsaws and Sunday school attendance stamps. He designed a set of illustrations for the Stations of the Cross which were widely reproduced and hung in a number of churches.

Lewis also exhibited at the Royal Academy between 1898 and 1904.

== Catalogue ==
=== Publication ===
- 1893: Picture Land illustrated by T. Noyes-Lewis, E. Taylor and E. Hall. (London: Dean & Son)
- 1903: The Valkyries: a romance founded on Wagner's opera by E.F. Benson ; illustrated by T. Noyes Lewis (London: Dean)
- 1905: Sunny Stories by M. A. Hoyer, Margery Williams, et al. ; illustrated by T. Noyes Lewis, Hilda Cowham, M. F. Taylor, et al (London: Raphael Tuck & Sons)
- 1914: The Home of Mother Church by J.A. Douglas ; illustrated by T. Noyes Lewis (Leighton Buzzard: Faith Press)
- 1916: Travelling Twins by Frances Leonard; illustrated by T. Noyes Lewis. (London: Wells Gardner, Darton)
- 1922: The Passion of Our Lord According to Saint Mark. Series: Booklet library ; no. 7 (London : Faith Press)
- 1925:
  - The House of Wings: a pleasant piece of pageantry for children young and old by Isa J. Postgate; illustrated by T. Noyes Lewis (London : Alexander Moring, The De La More Press)
  - The Lord's Prayer : for painting or for colouring with chalks. Series: Church painting books (London : Faith Press)
- 1926:
  - Genesis: a little library of exposition with new studies by E. Griffith-Jones and A.C. Welch ; illustrated by T. Noyes-Lewis (London: Cassell & Co.)
  - Hebrews : a little library of exposition, with new studies by W.R. Inge and H.L. Goudge. Illustrated by T. Noyes-Lewis (London: Cassell & Co.)
  - Psalms : a little library of exposition with new studies by L. MacLean Watt and J.E. McFadyen ; illustrated by Tom Noyes-Lewis (London: Cassell & Co.)
  - St. Luke : A little library of exposition with new studies, by F. W. Norwood, F.R. Barry et al, illustrated by T. Noyes-Lewis (London: Cassell & Co.)
- 1948: The Gospel Stamp Album by T. Noyes-Lewis. (London: The Gospel Stamps)
