= David Walsh (cricketer) =

English cricketer and cricket administrator

Personal information
- Full name: David Robert Walsh
- Born: 17 December 1946 (age 79); Bombay, Maharashtra, British India
- Batting: Right-handed
- Bowling: Right-arm medium
- Role: Batsman
- Relatives: Chris Walsh (son)

Domestic team information
- Years: Team
- 1966–1969: Oxford University

Career statistics
Competition	First-class
Matches	39
Runs scored	1,508
Batting average	25.55
100s/50s	2/6
Top score	207
Balls bowled	240
Wickets	6
Bowling average	21.50
5 wickets in innings	0
10 wickets in match	0
Best bowling	3/34
Catches/stumpings	13/–
- Source: ESPNcricinfo, 15 March 2014

David Robert Walsh (born 17 December 1946) is a former English first-class cricketer, cricket administrator, schoolmaster and published author.

== Education ==
Walsh was educated at Marlborough College, where he captained the First XI in 1964 and 1965 and played in the annual match for the Marylebone Cricket Club (MCC) Schools XI against Combined Services at Lord's, and then captained MCC Schools on their tour of South Africa in 1965–66. He went up to Brasenose College, Oxford University.

== Cricket career ==
A middle-order batsman, Walsh made his first-class debut for Oxford University in 1966, scoring 56 against Hampshire in his second match, but was unable to maintain his form and lost his place in the side. He struggled again in 1967, but kept his place in a weak side, and "fought his way doggedly out of his past to achieve reliability". He played all 15 of Oxford's matches, scoring 325 runs at an average of 16.25 with a top score of 46.

In the six matches he played in 1968 he was more successful, and he finished with 300 runs at 33.33. He hit 76 not out in the second innings against Glamorgan ("a splendid defensive innings") and 65 and 28 against Cambridge University at Lord's, adding 131 for the second wicket with the captain, Fred Goldstein. In the third match of the 1969 season he "produced a variety of strokes hitherto unseen from him" when he scored 207 against Warwickshire, with 32 fours and two sixes, adding 270 for the sixth wicket with Stuart Westley, which remains the record sixth wicket partnership for Oxford. He also scored 138 and 41 against D.H. Robins' XI. He finished the season with 748 runs at 37.40, and played in his third University match.

He played seven matches between 1966 and 1972 for Sussex Second XI, but all his first-class cricket was for Oxford University.

== Later career ==
After two years teaching at Melbourne Grammar School, where he played cricket for Melbourne CC and Melbourne University, Walsh was appointed to Tonbridge School in 1972 and spent the rest of his career there, retiring in 2009 as Second Master. He was Chairman of Headmasters' Conference Schools cricket for twenty years. He has held various administrative positions with the Marylebone Cricket Club (MCC), including twice being elected by members to the MCC Committee, and was a trustee of the MCC Foundation. He has also been President of the Yellowhammers Cricket Club from 2008 to 2024, Honorary Treasurer of the Cricketer Cup from 2002 to 2016 and Honorary Secretary of the Cricketer Cup since 2016.

Walsh is the author of three books. A Duty to Serve: Tonbridge School and the 1939–45 War was published by Third Millennium in 2011; Public Schools and the Great War: The Generation Lost, co-written with Sir Anthony Seldon, was published in 2013 by Pen & Sword; Public Schools and the Second World War, again co-authored with Sir Anthony Seldon, was published by Pen & Sword in August 2020. He also contributed to Marlborough College and the Great War in 100 Stories, published in 2018.

Walsh's son Chris played cricket for Kent in the 1990s.
