= Jamie Parker (cricketer) =

South African cricketer

Personal information
- Full name: James William Ralph Parker
- Born: 6 November 1980 (age 46); Durban, Natal, South Africa
- Batting: Left-handed
- Bowling: Left-arm medium
- Relatives: Paul Parker (father)

Domestic team information
- Years: Team
- 2001–2002: Cambridge University
- 2002: Cambridge UCCE

Career statistics
Competition	First-class
Matches	5
Runs scored	411
Batting average	45.66
100s/50s	0/3
Top score	86
Balls bowled	54
Wickets	0
Bowling average	–
5 wickets in innings	–
10 wickets in match	–
Best bowling	–
Catches/stumpings	1/–
- Source: Cricinfo, 3 September 2020

James William Ralph Parker (born 6 November 1980) is a South African-born English former first-class cricketer.

The son of the England Test cricketer Paul Parker, he was born in November 1980 at Durban. He was educated in England at Tonbridge School, before going up to St Catharine's College, Cambridge. While studying at Cambridge, he made two first-class appearances for Cambridge University against Oxford University in The University Matches of 2001 and 2002, in addition to making three first-class appearances for Cambridge UCCE against Middlesex, Essex and Surrey in 2002. (Note: Cambridge UCCE differed from Cambridge University Cricket Club in that it was open to students at Anglia Ruskin University, whereas Cambridge University Cricket Club is exclusively for students of the constituent colleges of the University of Cambridge.) For Cambridge University he scored 213 runs with two half centuries and a high score of 86, while for Cambridge UCCE he scored 198 runs with a high score of 55. His overall first-class average was a respectable 45.66.
