= Sha'arei Tsedek North London Reform Synagogue =

Synagogue in Whetstone, London

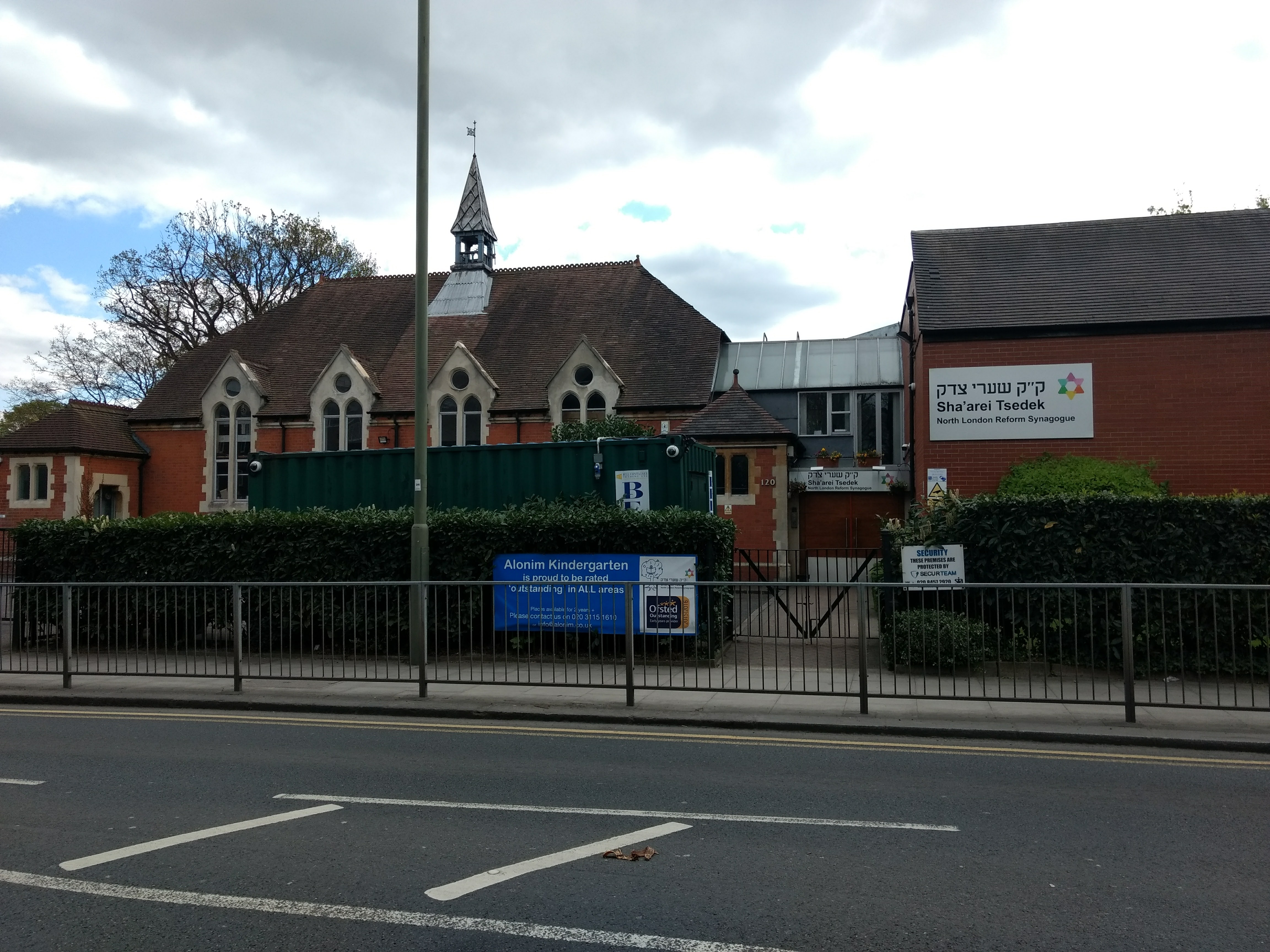
- The synagogue in 2017

- Location of the synagogue in Greater London

Religion
- Affiliation: Reform Judaism
- Ecclesiastical or organizational status: Synagogue
- Leadership: Rabbi Shulamit Ambalu; Rabbi Colin Eimer (Emeritus)
- Status: Active

Location
- Location: 120 Oakleigh Road North, Whetstone, Borough of Barnet, London, England N20 9EZ
- Country: United Kingdom
- Interactive map of Sha'arei Tsedek North London Reform Synagogue
- Coordinates: 51°37′46″N 0°10′03″W

Architecture
- Established: 1961 (as a congregation)
- Completed: c. 1890s (as a school); 1999 (as a synagogue)

Website
- shaarei-tsedek.org.uk

Sha'arei Tsedek North London Reform Synagogue is a Reform Jewish congregation and synagogue, located at 120 Oakleigh Road North, Whetstone, in the Borough of Barnet, in London, England, in the United Kingdom. The congregation is a member of the Movement for Reform Judaism and its principal rabbi, since 2018, is Rabbi Shulamit Ambalu.

== History ==
Founded in 1961, the congregation was previously known as Southgate and District Reform Synagogue until 19 May 2010. Between 1963 and c. 1981, the congregation worshiped from a former school building located at Queens Avenue, Green Lanes, in Winchmore Hill. It moved to a former warehouse, located at 45 High Street, in Southgate, until it acquired the Whetstone building in 1999.

== See also ==
Logo of the congregation

- Harold Newgass, GC (1896 – 1984)
- History of the Jews in England
- List of Jewish communities in the United Kingdom
- List of synagogues in the United Kingdom
