= Jonathan Arscott =

English cricketer (born 1970)

Jonathan Paul Arscott
- Born: July 4, 1970; Tooting, Surrey, England
- Education: Tonbridge School; Magdalene College, Cambridge
- Occupation: Cricketer
- Employer: Marlborough College Malaysia

Jonathan Paul Arscott (born 4 July 1970) is an English former cricketer who played for Cambridge University and the combined Oxford and Cambridge Universities between 1990 and 1993. He was born in Tooting and attended Tonbridge School and Magdalene College, Cambridge. He appeared in 31 first-class matches as a right handed batsman and wicket-keeper. He scored 678 runs with a highest score of 79. He held 30 catches and completed nine stumpings. Whilst at Cambridge he also won Blues for Hockey.

Until September 2018 he taught English at Tonbridge School where he coached hockey and cricket and led the Old Tonbridgian Cricket Club. After Tonbridge, he taught English at Marlborough College Malaysia, where he also served as Deputy Housemaster of Sheppard House.

More recently he was in Slovakia at the Cambridge International School as the Head of Enrichment.
