= Anne Sheppard =

British professor of ancient philosophy

Anne Sheppard is professor of ancient philosophy at Royal Holloway, University of London. She studied "Greats", (classics and philosophy), at St Anne's College, Oxford before completing her DPhil at Oxford on the literary theory of the Neoplatonist philosopher, Proclus. Sheppard's research interests relate to the interaction between philosophy and literature.

== Selected publications ==
- The Poetics of Phantasia: Imagination in Ancient Aesthetics, Sheppard, A. 13 Mar 2014 London: Bloomsbury Academic.
- Ancient Approaches to Plato's Republic, Sheppard, A. (ed.) Jul 2013 London: Institute of Classical Studies, London. (BICS Supplement 117)
- Aristotle and the Stoics reading Plato, Harte, V. (ed.), McCabe, M. M. (ed.), Sharples, R. W. (ed.) & Sheppard, A. (ed.) 2010 London: Institute of Classical Studies, London. (BICS Supplements; vol. 107)
- Greek and Roman Aesthetics, Sheppard, A. & Bychkov, O. 2010 Cambridge: Cambridge University Press.
- Studies on Porphyry, Karamanolis, G. (ed.) & Sheppard, A. (ed.) 2007 London: Institute of Classical Studies, London. (BICS Supplements; no. 94)
- Ancient Approaches to Plato's Timaeus, Sharples, R. W. (ed.) & Sheppard, A. (ed.) 2003 London: Institute of Classical Studies, London. (BICS Supplements; no. 78)
- Aesthetics. An introduction to the philosophy of art, Sheppard, A. 1987 Oxford: Oxford University Press. (OPUS)
- Studies on the 5th and 6th essays of Proclus' Commentary on the Republic, Sheppard, A. 1980 Goettingen: Vandenhoeck und Ruprecht. (Hypomnemata; no. 61)
