= David Kirch =

British businessman, collector and philanthropist (1936–2026)

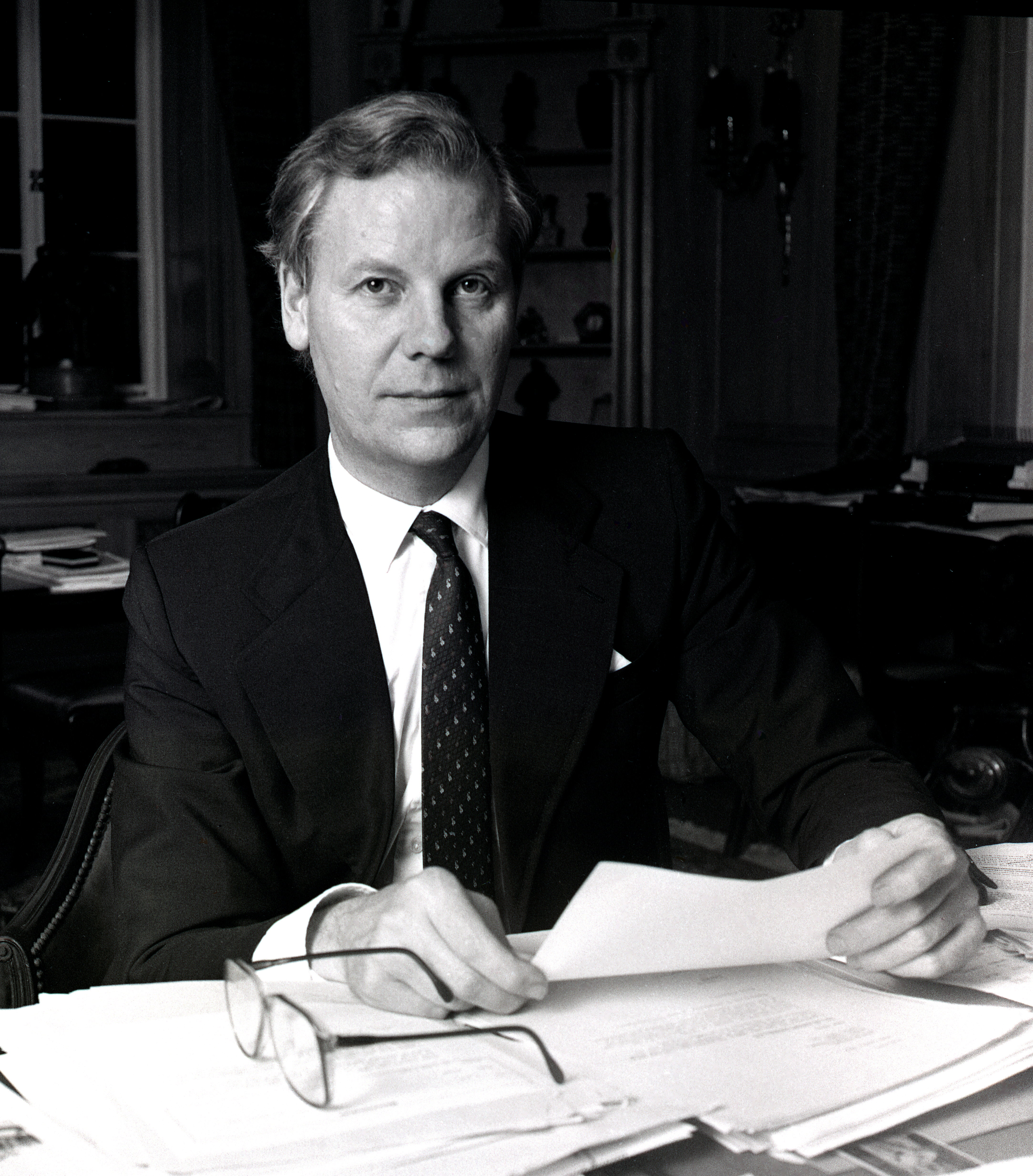
Kirch in 1993, portrait by Allan Warren

Sir David Roderick Kirch, KBE (29 July 1936 – 28 February 2026) was a British businessman, collector and philanthropist.

== Collecting ==
Over his lifetime Kirch built up and subsequently sold what was probably the world's largest collection of Zeppelin memorabilia, and a collection of provincial bank notes said to be "the most extensive selection of iconic and historical notes of this series ever assembled" by Barnaby Faull, Head of Spink's Banknotes department.

In later years, he sold off items from his various collections and donated the funds to his charitable trust.

== Philanthropy ==
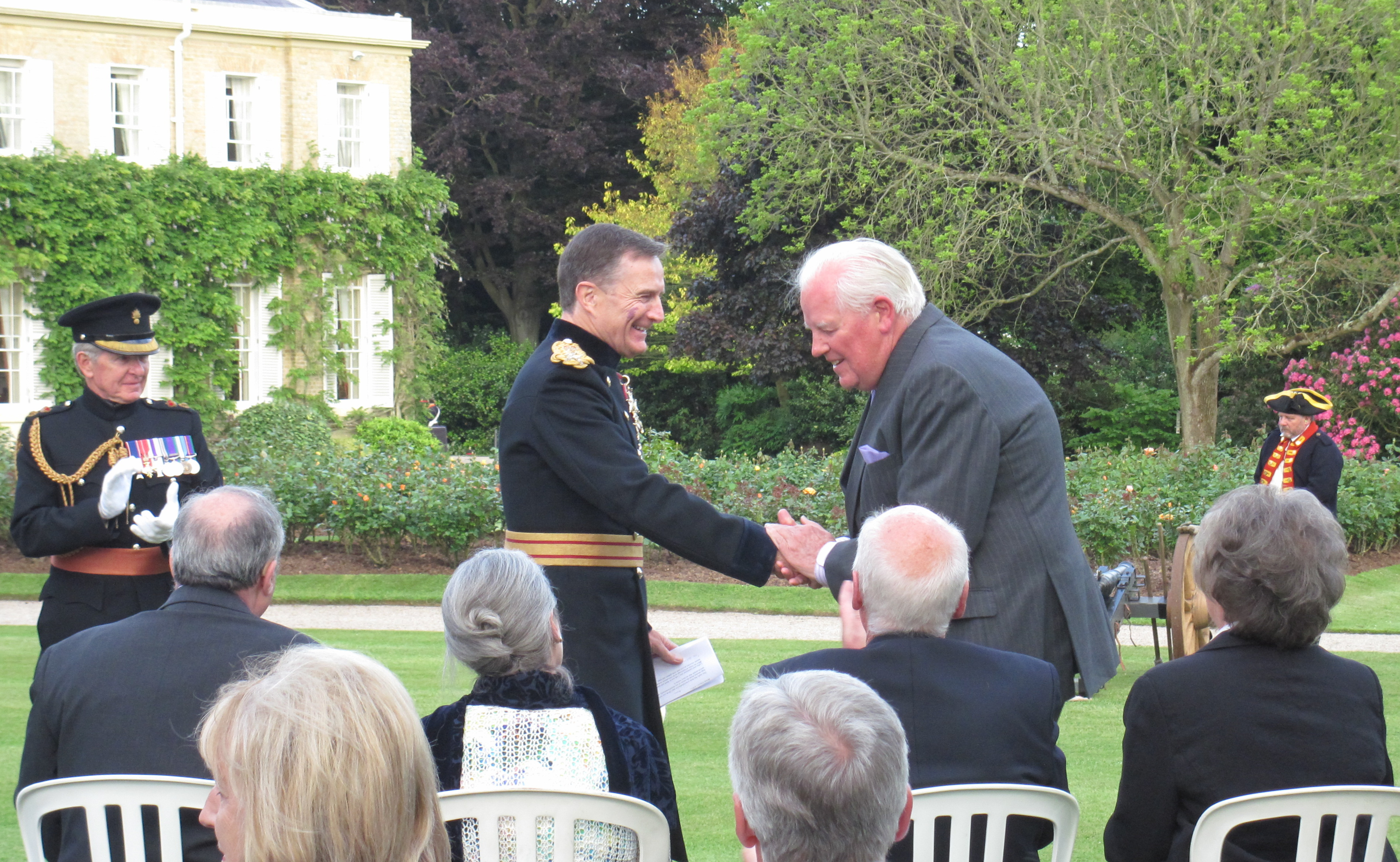
Government House, Jersey, 14 June 2013: Sir David Kirch is congratulated by the Lieutenant Governor of Jersey on the announcement of the award of a knighthood in the Queen's Birthday Honours list 2013

In 2006, Kirch celebrated his 70th birthday by announcing his plans to give everyone in Jersey, aged 70 or over, £100 in vouchers to spend in the island's Co-op supermarkets. He has continued to give away around £1 million, along the same lines, each year since 2006.

In 2012, Kirch announced his plans to leave his fortune, of approximately £100m, to the David Kirch Charitable Trust.

In 2013, he appeared at the top of The Sunday Times Giving List, and was appointed Knight Commander of the Order of the British Empire (KBE) in the 2013 Birthday Honours for "services as a philanthropist to senior citizens of Jersey".

== Personal life and death ==
Kirch lived in Jersey from 1973. He died on 28 February 2026, aged 89.
