= Harold Newgass =

English Royal Navy officer (1899–1984)

Harold Reginald Newgass
- Harold Newgass c.1941
- Born: 3 August 1899; London, England
- Died: 17 November 1984 (aged 85); West Stafford, Dorset, England
- Military career
- Allegiance: United Kingdom
- Branch: Territorial Army (1918–34); Royal Naval Volunteer Reserve (1940–45)
- Service years: 1918–1934; 1940–1945
- Rank: Lieutenant Commander
- Unit: HMS President
- Conflicts: First World War; Second World War: The Blitz
- Awards: George Cross

Harold Reginald Newgass, GC (3 August 1899 – 17 November 1984) was a Royal Naval Volunteer Reserve officer of the Second World War who was awarded the George Cross for the "great gallantry and undaunted devotion to duty" he showed in defusing an enemy parachute mine over two days in 1940.

== Early life ==
Newgass was born into a wealthy Jewish family in central London, at 54 Princes Gate, Knightsbridge, SW7 on 3 August 1899, the son of Maria Regina (née Hess) and Benjamin Newgass. He had two older brothers, Edgar Isaac and Gerald. As two of his paternal aunts married into wealthy American families, Babette Newgass Lehman (married to Meyer Lehman) and Esther Newgass Hellman (married to Isaias W. Hellman), his father was named the head of the Lehman family cotton operations in New Orleans (named Lehman, Newgass & Co) after the Lehman brothers moved their headquarters to New York City. His father later moved to Liverpool, then a global centre of textile manufacturing, and opened a branch office. The three brothers-in-laws continued to invest in each other's ventures in railroads, banks, and commodities. The family, especially Harold, were heavily involved in the Boy Scout movement and financed also many apprenticeship schemes for working-class boys. He was educated at Tonbridge School

Newgass had served in the Territorial Army (TA) attached to the mounted Royal Artillery firing 18-pounders, from 1918 to 1934. He trained at Larkhill and was commissioned in August 1918. He was posted to France as a second lieutenant before the Armistice of 11 November 1918, clearing ammunition dumps, where it may be he first learnt skills in bomb disposal. On demobilisation, he joined the Sussex Artillery TA as a captain (taken from his diary by his granddaughter T. Charalambous, 2023, with notes kept in his file at AJEX Jewish Military Museum archives). He also worked as a volunteer club leader at the Oxford and St George's Jewish Youth Club, first in Cannon Street Row in Whitechapel, and then in Berner Street Bernhard Baron Settlement, now in Henriques Street, E1 (the building still stands as luxury flats). He was affectionately known as 'Pop' Newgass.

== Second World War ==
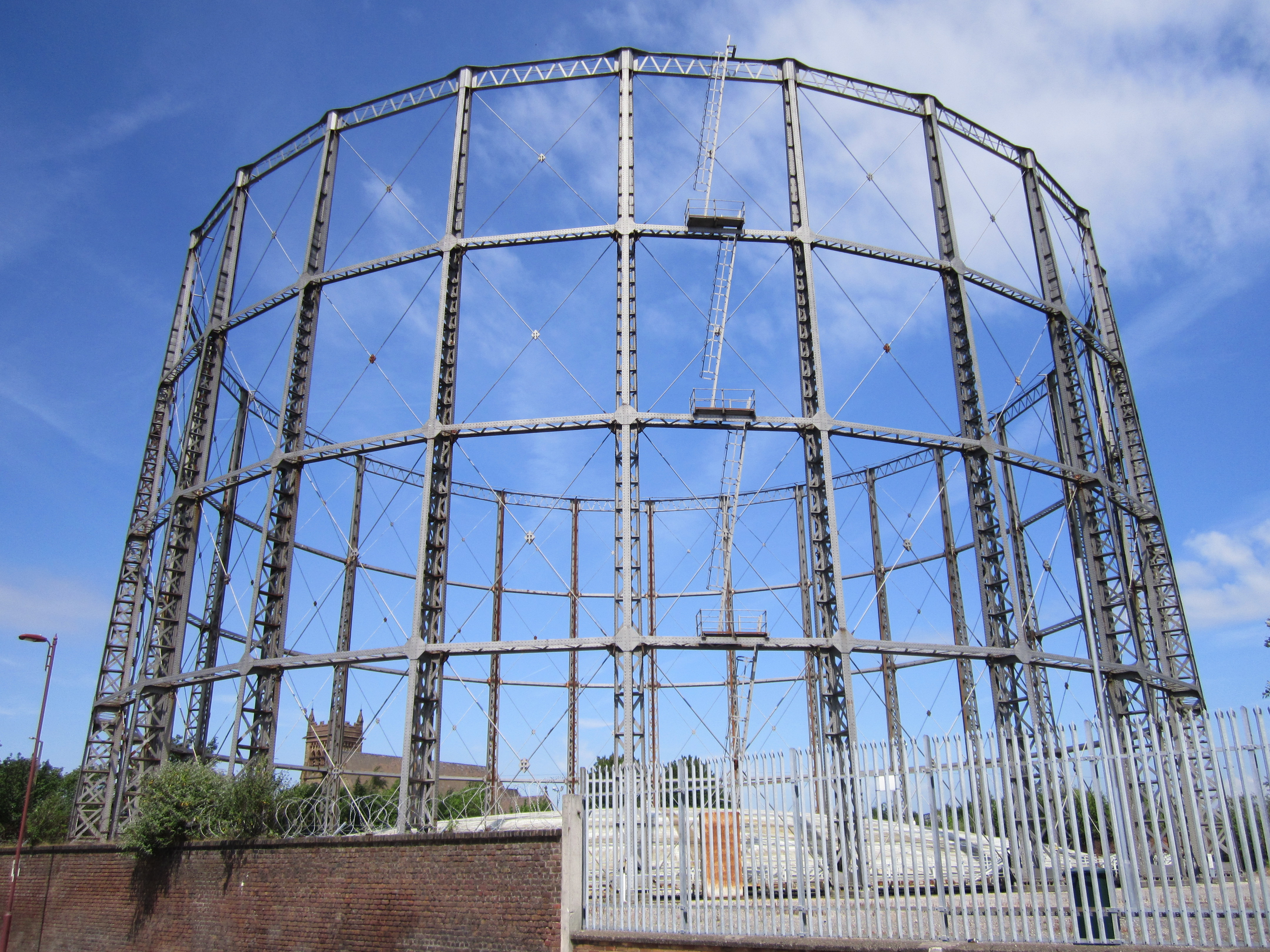
Gas holder, Banks Road, Garston

In the Second World War Newgass was an officer in the Royal Naval Volunteer Reserve. He was a temporary sub-lieutenant from September 1940 and a lieutenant from December 1940.

On the evening of 28–29 November 1940, a German parachute mine fell on the Garston Gas Works in Liverpool. It was unknown whether it was magnetic, acoustic, delayed action or just a "dud". Consequently, this caused extensive disruption in the area, with factory work halted and over 6,000 people removed from the vicinity. Additionally, railway and dock sidings were closed and the gas supply to the south and east of Liverpool was disrupted.

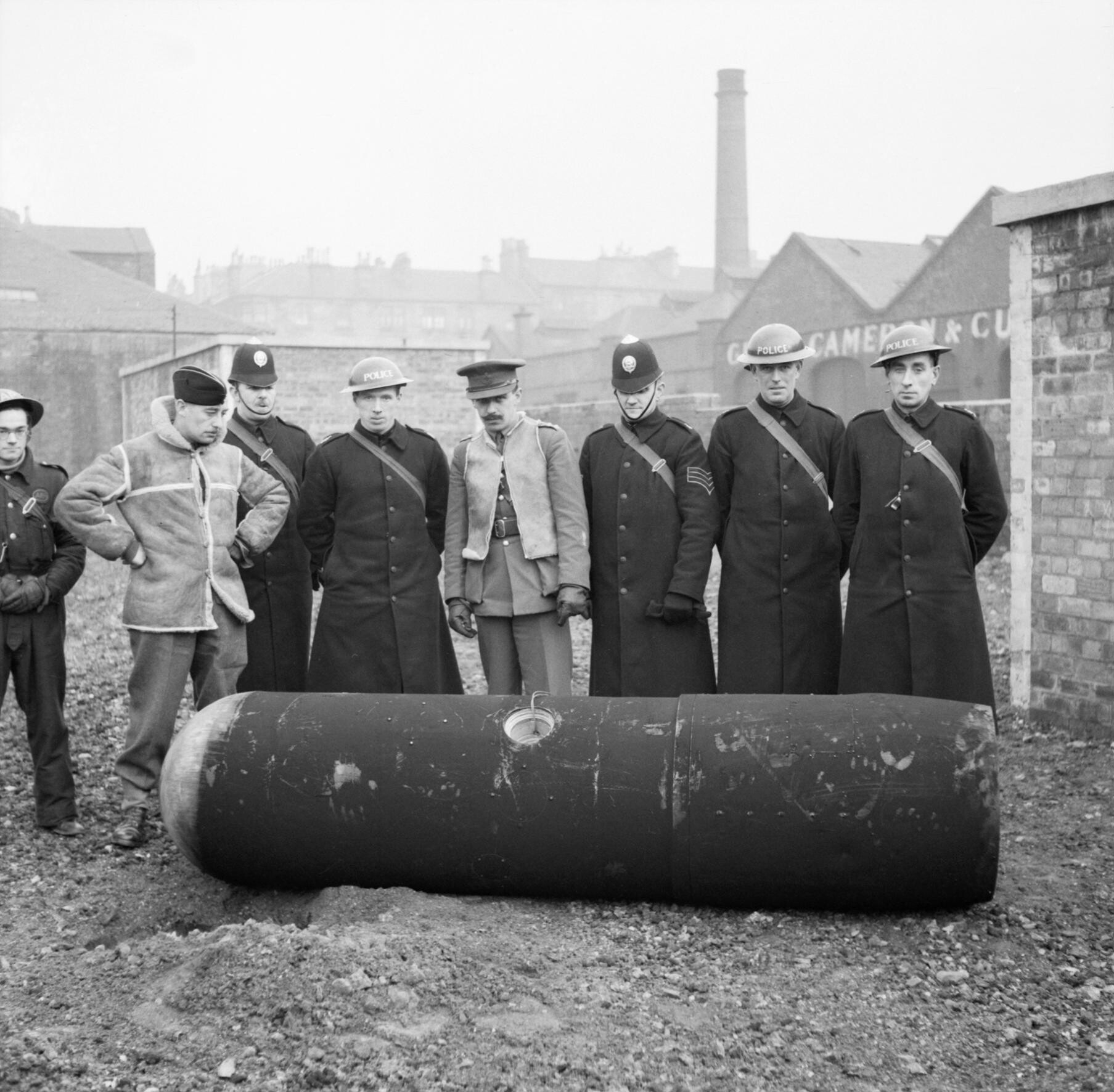
A defused German 1000kg Luftmine similar to the one defused by Newgass. Glasgow, 18 March 1941

The luftmine had fallen through a large gas holder and its parachute had become entangled in the hole in the roof. The large entry hole made by the mine allowed gas to escape and a portion of the roof to sink. The mine was resting on the floor nearly upright, nose down in some 7 feet (2.1 m) of oily water. It was also leaning on one of the 7 feet (2.1 m)-high brick piers on which, in turn, the iron pillars that supported the roof were fixed.

Additionally, the mine's fuse mechanism was against the pillar, meaning that the mine had to be turned before it could be defused. Some of the water was pumped out and an access hole was cut into the side of the gas holder. The job of now rendering the mine safe was left to Temporary Lieutenant Harold Newgass.

Newgass could only enter the gas holder with the aid of breathing apparatus supplying oxygen via cylinder. The Auxiliary Fire Service prepared six cylinders, each with a life of about 30 minutes. He would have to take it in stages over the next two days.

Newgass now worked hard to use each available cylinder's 30-minute window. The strain of the operation meant that Newgass used more and more oxygen and the 30 minutes dwindled rapidly. He later commented: "Working in an oxygen mask is a bit of a strain".

Using the first cylinder, Newgass checked the mine and prepared his plan to defuse the device. Using the second cylinder, he carried his tools and a ladder to the mine. On the third sortie he placed sandbags around the nose of the mine, and tied the top of the mine to the iron roof support.

On 30 November 1940, using the fourth cylinder, Newgass began the difficult defusing operation. Turning the mine to reveal the fuse he then removed it and the unit primer and detonator. Almost exhausted Newgass returned for the fifth cylinder and now turned the mine further to undo clock-keep ring. With his final cylinder he was again to extract the clock, rendering the mine inert.

Garston employers now removed the mine by removing it with block and tackle. It was put on a lorry for disposal. Had the mine detonated, the whole of Garston Works, and much of the surrounding properties would have been completely destroyed in the blast.

Newgass was awarded the George Cross on 4 March 1941. The announcement for the award was published in the London Gazette, reading:

The KING has been graciously pleased to approve the Award of the GEORGE CROSS for great gallantry and undaunted devotion to duty to:
Temporary Lieutenant Harold Reginald Newgass, R.N.V.R.

== Legacy ==
Newgass's medal group of George Cross, Defence Medal and War Medal 1939-45 are on display in the Victoria Cross & George Cross Gallery at the Imperial War Museum in London.

== Historical marker ==
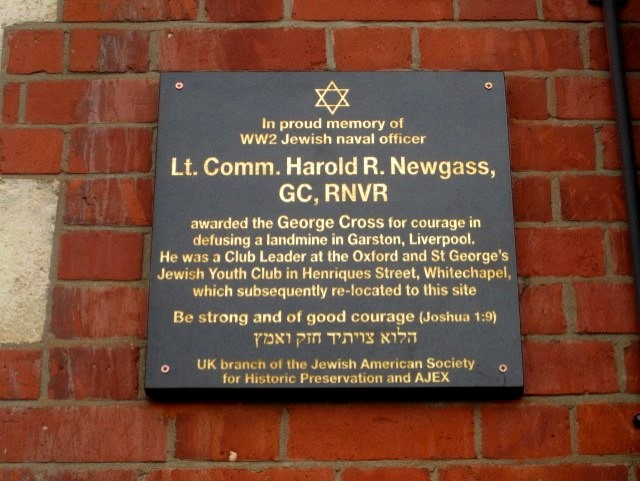
Lt Comm. Harold R. Newgass, GC, RNVR

A memorial plaque to Newgass was installed, in August 2023, on the building in which the Oxford and St George's Jewish Youth Club was last located, in Totteridge, north west London. It is now the Sha'arei Tsedek North London Reform Synagogue and many of its older members were once club members. The plaque was organised by the Jewish American Society for Historic Preservation, donor Jerry Klinger and AJEX archivist Martin Sugarman.

The plaque reads: "In Proud Memory of WW2 Jewish Naval Officer Lt. Comm. Harold R. Newgass, GC, RNVR - Awarded the George Cross for courage in defusing a landmine in Garston, Liverpool. He was a Club Leader at the Oxford and St George's Jewish Youth Club in Henriques Street, Whitechapel, which subsequently relocated to this site.

Be Strong and of Good Courage - (Joshua 1:9)

UK Branch of the Jewish American Society for Historic Preservation and AJEX"

There is a street named after him on a new housing estate in Garston where the other streets are named after English ports.
