= Chris Walsh (cricketer) =

English cricketer

Personal information
- Full name: Christopher David Walsh
- Born: 6 November 1975 (age 51); Pembury, Kent
- Batting: Right-handed
- Bowling: Leg break
- Relatives: David Walsh (father)

Domestic team information
- Years: Team
- 1996–1998: Kent
- 2000: Cambridgeshire

Career statistics
Competition	First-class	LA
Matches	4	1
Runs scored	98	0
Batting average	16.33	0.00
100s/50s	0/1	0/0
Top score	56*	0
Balls bowled	72	–
Wickets	0	–
Bowling average	–	–
5 wickets in innings	–	–
10 wickets in match	–	–
Best bowling	–	–
Catches/stumpings	3/–	0/–
- Source: Cricinfo, 21 July 2010

Christopher David Walsh (born 6 November 1975) is a former English cricketer. Walsh is a right-handed batsman who bowls leg break. He was born at Pembury, Kent.

Walsh made his first-class debut for Kent against Oxford University in 1996. From 1996 to 1998, he represented Kent in 4 first-class matches, with his final appearance for the county coming against Northamptonshire.

In 2000, Walsh joined Cambridgeshire, where he made his debut for the county in his only List-A appearance, which came Cumberland.

He also represented the county in the Minor Counties Championship, where he made his debut for the county in that competition against Cumberland. He represented the county in 2 further Minor Counties matches against Buckinghamshire and Norfolk.

== Family ==
His father David represented Cambridge University in first-class cricket.
