= Mark Church =

British cricket commentator

Mark Church is a British cricket commentator. He is currently a commentator for BBC London 94.9, reporting on all Surrey County Cricket Club's matches. He has been commentating on Surrey CCC matches since 2001.

== Biography ==
Since 2007, he has worked on Surrey TV providing highlights, interviews and other features regarding Surrey CCC and other cricket in general. Mark Church has also had success with his 'Garden Cricket' with his daughter, Isabelle.

They had an article featured in the New York Times, and over 100,000 views on their twitter videos. Church has also provided commentary for BBC London in other sports, including the London BroncosRugby League team, and the old London Racers, formerly of the Elite Ice Hockey League. In 2018, Church participated in a charity race to raise money for the Pancreatic Cancer Research Fund.
