= James Rowe (cricketer) =

English cricketer

Personal information
- Full name: James George Castell Rowe
- Born: 4 July 1979 (age 47); Farnborough, London, England
- Batting: Left-handed
- Relatives: Charles Rowe (father)

Domestic team information
- Years: Team
- 2001: Durham UCCE
- 2002: Kent Cricket Board

Career statistics
Competition	First-class	List A
Matches	3	1
Runs scored	128	30
Batting average	42.66	30.00
100s/50s	0/1	0/0
Top score	74*	30
Catches/stumpings	1/–	0/–
- Source: CricInfo, 13 November 2010

James George Castell Rowe (born 4 July 1979) is a former English cricketer who made three first-class cricket appearances for Durham University Centre of Cricketing Excellence in 2001. Rowe batted left-handed. He was born at Farnborough in south-east London and was educated at Tonbridge School in Kent.

After playing some Second XI cricket for Essex County Cricket Club in 2000, Rowe made his first-class debut for Durham UCCE against Durham County Cricket Club in April 2001. During the 2001 season, he represented the university in two further first-class matches against Lancashire and Worcestershire as well as playing for Kent County Cricket Club's Second XI. He scored 128 runs at a batting average of 42.66, with highest score of 74 not out, his only first-class half century.

Rowe graduated from Durham University (Hatfield College) in 2001.

The following season he represented the Kent Cricket Board in a single List A match against Hampshire County Cricket Club in the 2002 Cheltenham & Gloucester Trophy, scoring 30 runs.

== Family ==
His father, Charles Rowe played first-class cricket for Kent County Cricket Club and Glamorgan County Cricket Club between 1974 and 1984.
