= John Abercrombie (cricketer) =

English cricketer

Personal information
- Full name: John Abercrombie
- Born: 6 March 1817; France
- Died: 20 August 1892 (aged 75); Roxeth, Middlesex, England

Domestic team information
- Years: Team
- 1838: Cambridge University

Career statistics
Competition	First-class
Matches	1
Runs scored	0
Batting average	0.00
100s/50s	0/0
Top score	0
Catches/stumpings	0/–
- Source: Cricinfo, 28 May 2013

John Abercrombie (6 March 1817 – 20 August 1892) was an English first-class cricketer. Abercrombie's batting style is unknown.

While attending the Gonville and Caius College, Cambridge, Abercrombie made a single first-class cricket appearance for Cambridge University in The University Match against Oxford University at Lord's in 1838. He was absent injured in Cambridge University's first-innings, but did return for their second-innings, where he was dismissed for a duck by Alfred Lowth. The fixture was won by Oxford University by 98 runs.

Prior to Cambridge Abercrombie, attended Tonbridge School.

He died at Roxeth, Middlesex on 20 August 1892.
