= Eric Stuart Dougall =

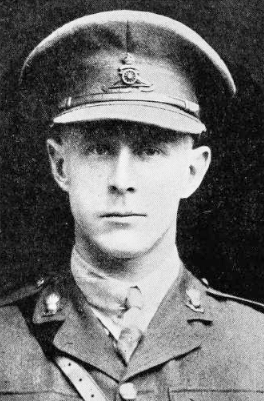
- Born: 13 April 1886; Tunbridge Wells, Kent, England
- Died: 14 April 1918 (aged 32); Kemmel, Belgium
- Burial place: Westoutre British Cemetery, Belgium
- Military career
- Allegiance: United Kingdom
- Branch: British Army
- Rank: Major
- Units: Royal Field Artillery
- Conflicts: World War I
- Awards: Victoria Cross; Military Cross

Major Eric Stuart Dougall VC MC (13 April 1886 – 14 April 1918) was an English recipient of the Victoria Cross, the highest and most prestigious award for gallantry in the face of the enemy that can be awarded to British and Commonwealth forces.

Dougall was born in Tunbridge Wells on 13 April 1886 to Andrew and Emily Elizabeth Dougall. He was educated at Tonbridge School, where he won the Cras, the school's cross country race. When he won his VC he was 31 years old, and an Acting Captain in the Special Reserve, Royal Field Artillery, attached to A Bty., 88th Brigade. He was awarded the Victoria Cross for his deeds on 10 April 1918 at Messines, Belgium.

For most conspicuous bravery and skilful leadership in the field when in command of his battery. Capt. Dougall maintained his guns in action from early morning throughout a heavy concentration of gas and high-explosive shell. Finding that he could not clear the crest owing to the withdrawal of our line, Captain Dougall ran his guns on to the top of the ridge to fire over open sights. By this time our infantry had been pressed back in line with the guns. Captain Dougall at once assumed command of the situation, rallied and organised the infantry, supplied them with Lewis guns, and armed as many gunners as he could spare with rifles. With these he formed a line in front of his battery which during this period was harassing the advancing enemy with a rapid rate of fire. Although exposed to both rifle and machine gun fire this officer fearlessly walked about as though on parade, calmly giving orders and encouraging everybody. He inspired the infantry with his assurance that "So long as you stick to your trenches I will keep my guns here". This line was maintained throughout the day, thereby delaying the enemy's advance for over twelve hours. In the evening, having expended all ammunition, the battery received orders to withdraw. This was done by man-handling the guns over a distance of about 800 yards of shell-cratered country, an almost impossible feat considering the ground and the intense machine gun fire. Owing to Captain Dougall's personality and skilful leadership throughout this trying day there is no doubt that a serious breach in our line was averted. This gallant officer was killed four days later whilst directing the fire of his battery.

— The London Gazette, 31 May 1918

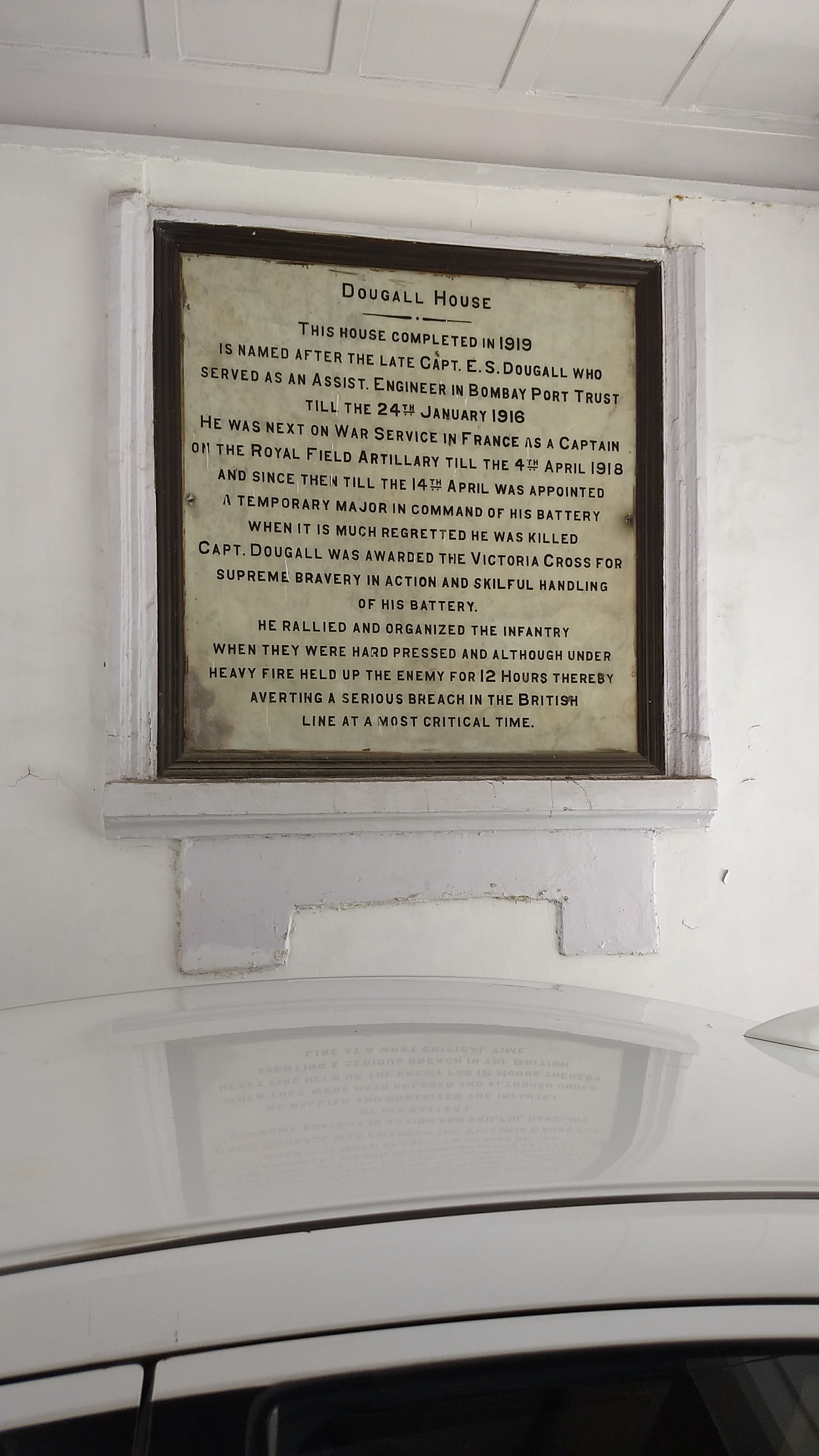
Placard in memory of E. S. Dougall at Dougall House, Mumbai

He was killed in action at Kemmel, Belgium on 14 April 1918. His VC is owned by Pembroke College, Cambridge.

Prior to his war service, Dougall was an Assistant Engineer at the Bombay Port Trust, and there is an officers' residence building named after him (called Dougall House) there.

== Bibliography ==
- Monuments to Courage (David Harvey, 1999)
- The Register of the Victoria Cross (This England, 1997)
- VCs of the First World War - Spring Offensive 1918 (Gerald Gliddon, 1997)
- Ingleton, Roy (2011). Kent VCs. Pen and Sword Books. ISBN 978-1848844094.
