= 1976 John Player League =

- Administrator: Test and County Cricket Board
- Cricket format: Limited overs cricket (40 overs per innings)
- Tournament format: League
- Champions: Kent (3rd title)
- Participants: 17
- Matches: 136
- Most runs: 710 Barry Richards (Hampshire)
- Most wickets: 31 John Lever (Essex)

The 1976 John Player League was the eighth edition of what was generally known as the Sunday League. The competition was won for the third time by Kent County Cricket Club.

== Standings ==
Team	Pld	W	T	L	N/R	A	Pts	R/R
Kent (C)	16	10	0	6	0	0	40	4.989
Essex	16	10	0	6	0	0	40	4.56
Leicestershire	16	10	0	6	0	0	40	4.703
Somerset	16	10	0	6	0	0	40	4.847
Sussex	16	10	0	6	0	0	40	4.564
Nottinghamshire	16	9	0	7	0	0	36	4.91
Warwickshire	16	9	0	7	0	0	36	4.909
Hampshire	16	8	0	8	0	0	32	4.931
Lancashire	16	8	0	8	0	0	32	4.076
Surrey	16	8	0	8	0	0	32	5.002
Worcestershire	16	8	0	8	0	0	32	4.872
Derbyshire	16	7	0	9	0	0	28	4.614
Middlesex	16	7	0	9	0	0	28	4.496
Northamptonshire	16	7	0	9	0	0	28	4.399
Yorkshire	16	6	0	10	0	0	24	4.769
Glamorgan	16	5	0	11	0	0	20	4.414
Gloucestershire	16	4	0	12	0	0	16	4.135
Team marked (C) finished as champions. Source: CricketArchive

== See also ==
Sunday League
