= Chris Waller (cricketer) =

English cricketer (born 1948)

Christopher Edward Waller (born 3 October 1948) is an English former cricketer active from 1967 to 1985 who played for Surrey and Sussex. He was born in Guildford. He appeared in 267 first-class matches as a righthanded batsman who bowled left-arm orthodox spin. He scored 1,473 runs with a highest score of 51 not out and took 630 wickets with a best performance of seven for 61.
