= Tonbridge School =

Public school in Tonbridge, Kent, England

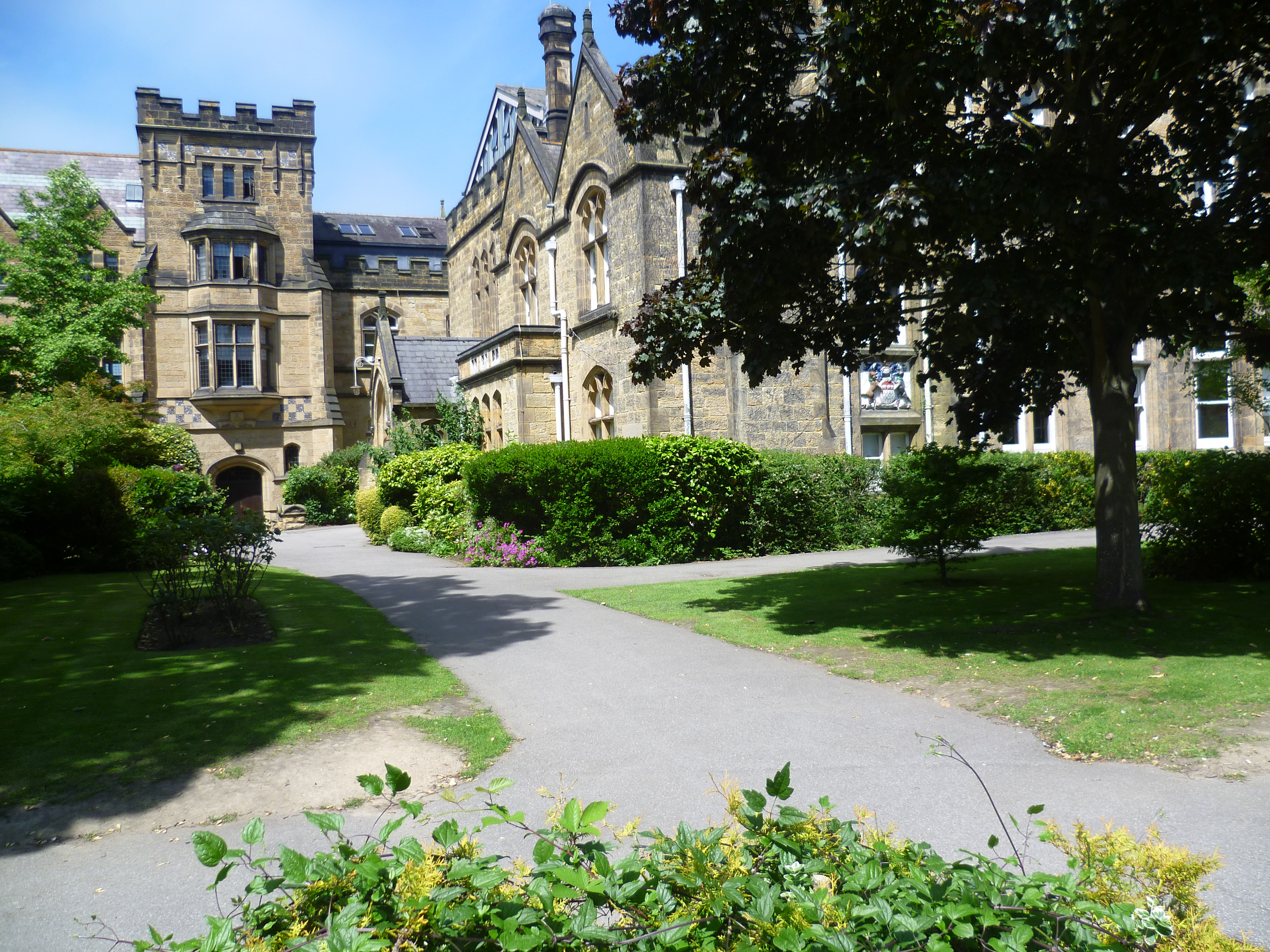

Location
- High Street; Tonbridge, Kent, TN9 1JP; England; 51.2000°N 0.2765°E

Information
- Type: Private school Boarding school Day school
- Motto: Latin: Deus Dat Incrementum (God Giveth the Increase)
- Established: 1553; 473 years ago
- Founder: Andrew Judde
- Department for Education URN: 118959 Tables
- Headmaster: James Priory
- Gender: Boys
- Age: 13 to 18
- Enrolment: c. 800
- Student to teacher ratio: 8:1
- Campus size: 150-acre (61 ha)
- Campus type: Suburban
- Houses: 7 boarding, 5 day
- Colours: Black, white and maroon
- Publication: The Tonbridgian
- Budget: £43,757,939 (2024)
- Revenue: £45,727,610 (2024)
- Alumni: Old Tonbridgians
- Website: www.tonbridge-school.co.uk

Tonbridge School is a private school with boarding and day school facilities for boys aged 13–18 in Tonbridge, Kent, England. Founded in 1553 by Andrew Judde (sometimes spelt Judd), the school is a member of the Eton Group and has close links with the Worshipful Company of Skinners, one of the oldest livery companies in London.

There are currently around 800 boys in the school, aged between 13 and 18. The school occupies a site of 150 acres (60 hectares) on the edge of Tonbridge, and is largely self-contained, though most of the boarding and day houses are in nearby streets. Since its foundation, the school has been rebuilt twice on the original site. For the academic year 2023/24, Tonbridge charges boarders £21,417 per term and £16,069 per term for day pupils,making it the 4th and 6th most expensive Headmasters' and Headmistresses' Conference (HMC) boarding and day school respectively.

The headmaster is James Priory who began his tenure at the school in 2018.

Tonbridge School was listed in the 2024 edition of The Schools Index as one of the world's best 150 private schools and among top 30 UK senior schools.

== History ==
=== Foundation ===
The school was founded in 1553 by Andrew Judde, being granted its royal charter by Edward VI. The first headmaster was the Revd John Proctor, a fellow of All Souls College, Oxford. From 1553 until his death in 1558, Judde was the sole governor of the school, and he framed the statutes that were to govern it for the next 270 years. On Judde's death, the school was passed to the Skinners' Company, after a dispute with Judde's business partner Henry Fisher.

For the next hundred years few details of the school survive apart from rare records in the Skinners' Company books. Headmaster Proctor died in 1558, and was succeeded by a series of headmasters, usually clergy and always classical scholars. They included the Revd William Hatch (1587–1615), the first Old Tonbridgian headmaster. According to the Skinners' records, the Revd Michael Jenkins (1615–24) was appointed because "he was the only one who turned up". During his time as headmaster, the school received a series of generous endowments from Thomas Smythe, the first governor of the East India Company and son of Andrew Judde's daughter Alice.

=== Second hundred years ===
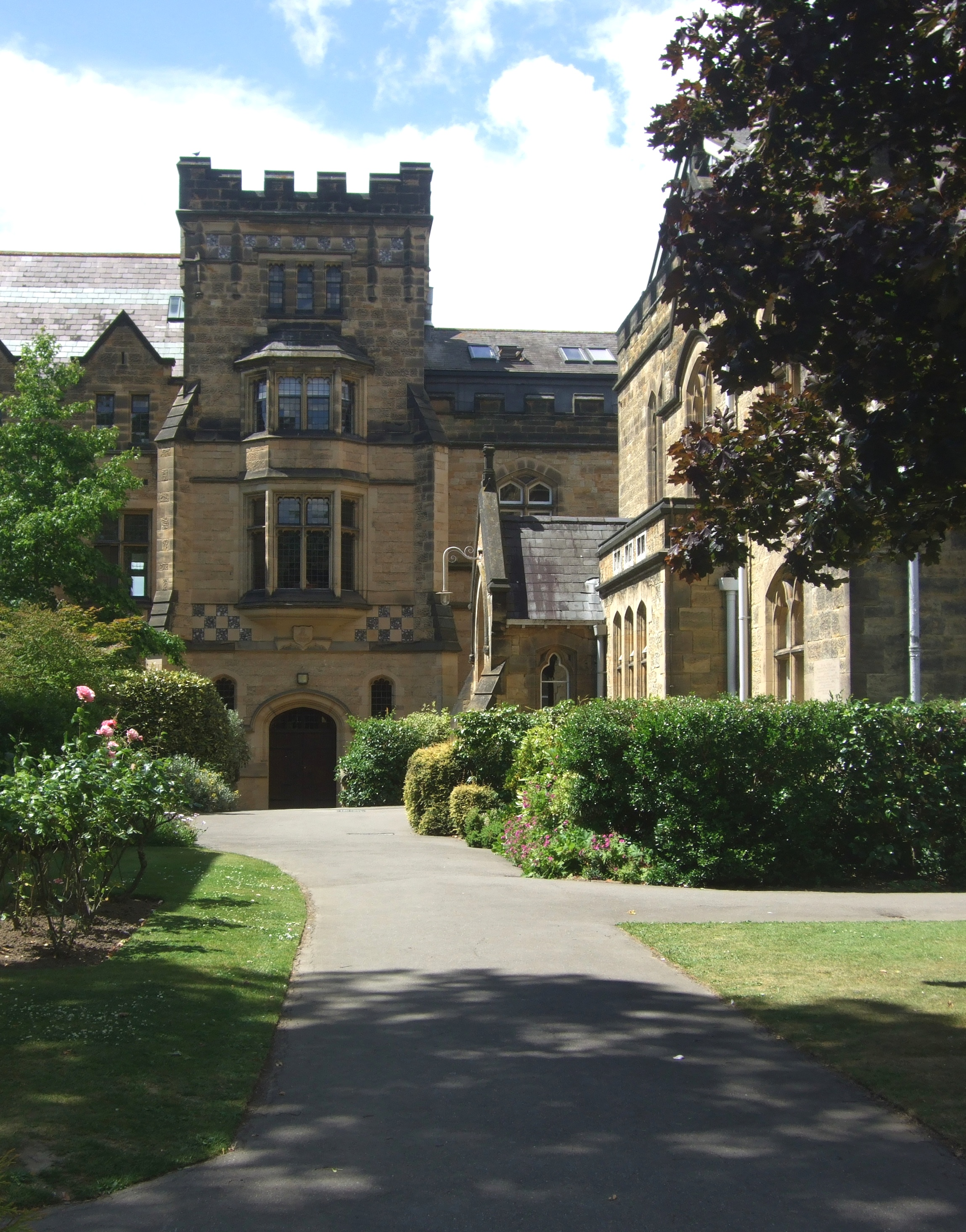
A section of the old school building

Very little written material relating to the school over the next century survives. Numbers fluctuated between 40 and 90, and the school obtained a new refectory and a new library. However, from 1680 numbers declined, and for a few years the examiners reported that there were no candidates fit for university study. In 1714, the Reverend Richard Spencer, of King's College, Cambridge, was made headmaster. He was an immediate success and very popular, and by 1721 numbers had risen to over seventy. The governors raised Spencer's salary to 30 guineas, and several of his pupils went on to successful careers. These included a future Lord Mayor of London, a vice-chancellor of Cambridge University, and George Austen, father of Jane Austen.

The first Old Tonbridgian dinner was held on 8 June 1744. The year before this, however, Spencer had resigned and the headmastership was bestowed upon the Reverend James Cawthorn. Cawthorn persuaded the governors to build a new library at the south end of the school in 1760, and it survives today as the headmaster's house and the Skinners' Library. In 1765, the townspeople of Tonbridge asked the question of free education, and governors' legal team decided that the parishioners' children, provided they could write competently and read Latin and English perfectly, had the right to learn at the school paying only the sixpence entry fee.

In 1772, classical scholar Vicesimus Knox was made headmaster, but he held office for only six years. During his tenure, numbers dropped to only seventeen. His son and namesake, Vicesimus Knox, was to take his father's place in 1779. School numbers under the young Knox rose to 85, and pupils began to arrive from all over England and also from abroad.

=== 19th century ===
Knox retired in 1812, and was succeeded by his younger son, Thomas. The period of Knox's headmastership was one of national economic and political change, but at the school the greatest change was the increasing importance of cricket. John Abercrombie was the school's first cricket blue (for Cambridge) in 1839. In 1818, a nationwide commission visited Tonbridge to investigate on behalf of the reforming government. Over the next few years, a new scheme for the school was prepared and approved by the Lord Chancellor. New buildings were agreed upon by the governors, and a new dining room and dormitories were built. The school also bought the Georgian building on the High Street to the north of the new junior school, and it was renamed Judde House. This was the school's second boarding house, with the original buildings serving to house boys of the larger School House. In 1826, the governors bought the field which now contains the Head cricket ground, and the patches to the north and south of it, later to be called the Upper and Lower Hundreds. In 1838, Knox took the decision to level the Head, a considerable project, using labour and earth from the new railway workings in the town. The labourers often engaged in fights with the boys, as they were lodged nearby. The Head became the focal point of the school and was regarded as one of the most beautiful cricket grounds in the south of England. Thomas Knox died shortly after the completion of his cricket pitch, in 1843, whilst preparing to preach in the parish church. His death brought to an end the 71-year reign of the Knox family.

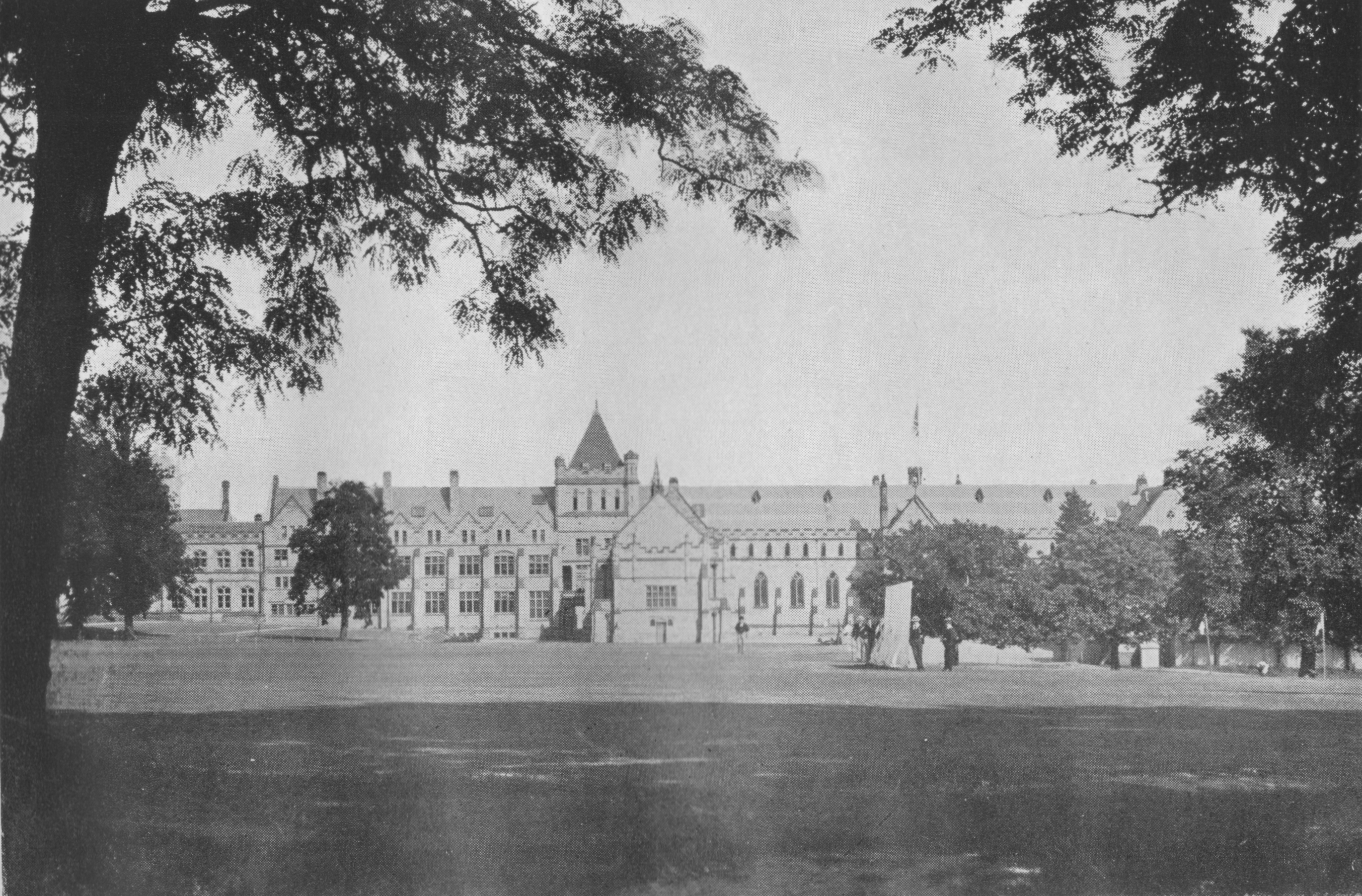
Tonbridge School, from the cricket field (before 1903)

=== World wars ===
Tonbridge lost a great many former pupils in both world wars; 415 Old Tonbridgians and three masters died in the Great War, and a further 301 OTs died in the line of duty between 1939 and 1945.

- Eric Stuart Dougall was awarded a posthumous Victoria Cross to go with his Military Cross in Belgium during the closing stages of World War I.
- James Brindley Nicolson became the only RAF fighter pilot to be awarded the Victoria Cross during the course of the Battle of Britain after climbing back into his burning Hawker Hurricane to engage a Messerschmitt Bf 110 over the skies of Southampton.
- Harold Newgass was awarded the school's only George Cross during World War II after defusing an enemy mine over two days.

=== Post-war years ===
Lawrence Waddy took over as headmaster in 1949. The Tonbridge he inherited was still a largely Victorian institution; fagging and ritual caning were still in place, and sport was considered more important than academia. Over the next 40 years personal fagging was abolished (ending in 1965), and the intellectual life of the school was revitalised (particularly under the headmastership of Michael McCrum). McCrum, headmaster from 1962 to 1970, abolished the right of senior boys to administer corporal punishment, taking over for himself the duty of administering routine canings. Boaters (known at the school as "barges"), straw hats worn by boys, were no longer compulsory uniform after a major town-gown fight in the 1970s. The headmaster until 2005 was Martin Hammond.

In 2005, the school was one of fifty leading independent schools found guilty of running an illegal price-fixing cartel, exposed by The Times, which had allowed them to drive up fees for thousands of parents. Each school was required to pay a nominal penalty of £10,000 and all agreed to make ex-gratia payments totalling three million pounds into a trust designed to benefit pupils who attended the schools during the period in respect of which fee information was shared. Jean Scott, the head of the Independent Schools Council, said that independent schools had always been exempt from anti-cartel rules applied to business, and were following a long-established procedure in sharing the information with each other, and that they were unaware of the change to the law (on which they had not been consulted). She wrote to John Vickers, the OFT director-general, saying, "They are not a group of businessmen meeting behind closed doors to fix the price of their products to the disadvantage of the consumer. They are schools that have quite openly continued to follow a long-established practice because they were unaware that the law had changed."

== Houses ==
There are twelve houses at Tonbridge School: seven boarding and five day houses. Each house has its own house colours. Each house contains approximately 65 pupils.

== Chapel ==
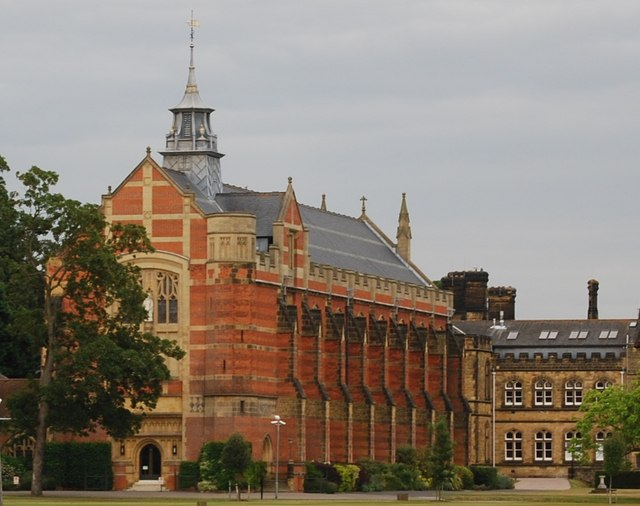
Tonbridge school chapel as seen from the West looking across The Head

The Chapel of St Augustine of Canterbury occupies a central position in the school next to the old buildings and Orchard Centre. The chapel is collegiate in layout with twelve blocks of pews and seats corresponding to the respective Houses. The focal point of the chapel is the stone high altar and there are two pulpits, one each on the north and south sides of the chapel. The narthex or outer lobby of the chapel is also the school war memorial. In addition, the names of all Old Tonbridgians who died in the first or second world wars are displayed in stone or ironwork. In September 1988, it was severely damaged by fire with almost all objects in the building being destroyed except a 15th-century stone sculpture. Restoration took seven years to complete and the chapel was reconsecrated by the Bishop of Rochester in October 1995.

== Sport ==
The school offers a diverse range of sports, from traditional rugby and cricket to niche activities like fives and water polo.

The school has produced a number of international rugby players throughout the history of rugby union. In 1871, in the first ever international rugby match, Tonbridge was represented by two players, J.E. Bentley and J.H. Luscombe. These players were also members of a team called the Gipsies Football Club, a London-based rugby football club for Old Tonbrigians founded in 1868. This club produced four other internationals including England captain Francis Luscombe, and was also one of the founding members of the Rugby Football Union.

Tonbridge alumni who have gone on to represent the England cricket team include Kenneth Hutchings, Colin Cowdrey, Roger Prideaux, Chris Cowdrey, Richard Ellison, Ed Smith and Zak Crawley. All seven also played for Kent County Cricket Club and there is a long association between the school and Kent with a number of other Old Tonbridgians playing first-class cricket for the county side. Former Kent professionals who have coached the school cricket team include Alan Dixon, whom Richard Ellison credits for developing his swing bowling abilities, and John Knott.

== Music ==
The school has a strong musical tradition: around half the boys take regular music lessons and over 80 achieve grade 7 or above. About 12 music scholarships are awarded every year. Tonbridge is also a "Steinway School", meaning that over 90% of pianos are designed or built by Steinway & Sons.

The school chapel holds regular concerts for the various orchestras, including a large symphony orchestra for the most accomplished players, conducted by the director of music. The chapel is also home to an internationally respected 4-manual tracker-action pipe organ with 67 speaking stops and 4,830 pipes, built by Marcussen & Søn in 1995.

== List of headmasters ==
- Rev. John Proctor, M.A., 1553(?)-1558
- Rev. John Lever, 1559–1574
- Rev. John Stockwood, M.A., 1574–1586
- Rev. William Hatch, M.A., 1586–1615
- Rev. Michael Jenkins, M.A., 1615–1624
- Rev. Joel Callis, M.A., 1624–1637
- Rev. William St. John Newman, M.A., 1637–1640
- Rev. Thomas Horne, D.D., 1640–1649
- Rev. Nicholas Grey, D.D., 1649–1660
- Rev. John Goad, B.D., 1660–1662
- Rev. Christopher Wase, B.D., 1662–1668
- Rev. Thomas Roots, M.A., 1668–1714
- Rev. Richard Spencer, M.A., 1714–1743
- Rev. James Cawthorn, M.A.., 1743–1761
- Rev. Johnson Towers, M.A., 1761–1770
- Rev. Vicesimus Knox, D.D., 1771–1812
- Rev. Thomas Knox, D.D., 1812–1843
- Rev. James Ind Welldon, D.C.L., 1843–1875
- Rev. Theophilus Barton Rowe, M.A., 1875–1890
- Rev. Joseph Wood, D.D., 1890–1898
- Rev. Charles Coverdale Tancock, D.D., 1898–1907
- Charles Lowry, M.A., 1907–1922
- Harold N. P. Sloman, 1922–1939
- Eric E. A. Whitworth, 1939–1949
- Rev Lawrence H. Waddy, 1949–1962
- Michael McCrum, 1962–1970
- Robert M. Ogilvie, 1970–1975
- Christopher. H. D. Everett, 1975–1989
- John 'Martin' Hammond, 1990–2005
- Tim H. P. Haynes, 2005–2018
- James E. Priory, 2018–

== Notable staff ==
- Jonathan Arscott – cricketer
- Ewart Astill – Master in charge of Cricket
- George Austen – 18th century Second master and father of Jane Austen
- Logie Bruce Lockhart, Scottish rugby international and headmaster of Gresham's School
- James Cawthorn – headmaster 1743–61 and poet
- Derek Chadwick
- Hilary Davan Wetton – former Director of Music
- John Dewes, former test cricketer
- Clive Dytor – former chaplain
- Martin Hammond – Headmaster (1990–2005)
- James Hodgson, cricketer and headmaster of Bedford School
- John Inverarity – former Australia cricketer, briefly taught maths at Tonbridge after retiring from cricket
- John Johnston – headmaster of Highgate School from 1908 to 1936 and early promoter of the study of aeronautics
- Vicesimus Knox – 18th century Headmaster
- William Langford (1875–1957) – first-class cricketer and later coach
- The Reverend John Langhorne – (1836–1911), classics master and house master from 1860 to 1877.
- Tony Little – a former assistant master at Tonbridge, Headmaster of Eton College
- Michael McCrum – academic and historian, Headmaster (1962–70)
- Clement Moody, high church Anglican clergyman, theologian, classical scholar, and Royal Arch freemason, taught at Tonbridge School from 1832 to 1840
- Robert Maxwell Ogilvie
- Paul Parker – retired cricketer, now Classics and Modern Languages teacher
- Sir Anthony Seldon – vice-chancellor and headmaster, formerly head of history and general studies (1989–93)
- Jonathan Smith – novelist and writer, former head of English
- D. C. Somervell – historian and author
- Haldane Campbell Stewart – Director of Music (1898–1918), organist and choirmaster at Magdalen College, Oxford, cricketer for Kent.
- David Walsh, retired cricketer, historian and former second master
- Andy Whittall – Director of School Development, retired Zimbabwe cricketer, former teacher/coach and Housemaster of Ferox Hall

== Notable alumni ==
Former pupils are known at the school as Old Tonbridgians (OTs) and can join an organisation called the Old Tonbridgians' Society.

== Arms ==
Coat of arms of Tonbridge School
Notes Granted 16 March 1923 Crest On a wreath of the colours a boar's head erased per pale Gules and Sable armed and langued Azure gorged with a coronet composed of fleurs-de-lis Or. Escutcheon Quarterly Gules and Azure a cross fillet Or between in the first and fourth quarters a fesse raguly between three boars' heads couped Argent armed and langued Azure and in the second and third quarters three lions rampant Gold. Motto Deus Dat Incrementum

== See also ==
- Eton Group
- List of English and Welsh endowed schools (19th century)
- List of SR V "Schools" class locomotives
- Public school (United Kingdom)
- Worshipful Company of Skinners
