= List of people educated at Whitgift School =

This is a list of Old Whitgiftians (abbreviated OWs), former pupils of Whitgift School, which is a British private boys' day and boarding school in South Croydon in London.

== Academia, medicine and science ==
- Gordon Kauffman, architect of the Hoover Dam
- Stafford Beer, cybernetics expert, businessman and author
- Sir James Berry, surgeon
- Peter Bourne, physician, anthropologist, biographer, author and international civil servant
- Sir Robert Boyd, space research scientist
- Donald Broom, biologist
- Hugh Ernest Butler FRSE, astronomer
- Gladwin Albert Hurst Buttle, pharmacologist
- Sir Bernard Crick, academic, British political theorist, author
- John William Henry Eyre FRSE, bacteriologist
- Walter Godfrey, architect, antiquary, and architectural and topographical historian
- Dalziel Hammick, research chemist
- Bryan Harrison, virologist
- Michael Hart, political scientist
- Michael Hassell, biologist
- Eric John Hewitt, plant physiologist
- Arthur Robert Hinks, astronomer and geographer
- Francis Hodgson, educator, cleric and author
- Andrew Holding, Biomedical Academic and Radio Presenter
- Liam Hudson, social psychologist and author
- Kenneth H. Jackson, linguist and translator
- Euan MacKie, archaeologist and anthropologist
- Michael Posner, economist
- Kawal Rhode, engineer, professor at King's College London
- Dudley Shallcross, professor of atmospheric chemistry
- Dafydd Stephens, audiological physician
- John Tedder, 2nd Baron Tedder, professor of chemistry
- Eric Tomlin, philosopher
- Sir Gilbert Walker, physicist and statistician
- Roger Wickson, teacher, historian
- Paul Wild, pioneering radio astronomer, chairman of CSIRO

== Business ==
- Sir Bernard Ashley, businessman, husband of Laura Ashley
- Jerry Buhlmann, Chief Executive of Aegis Group
- John Wingett Davies (1908–1992), cinema exhibitor and director of Davies and Newman
- Andy Duncan, former Chief Executive, Channel 4
- Kevin Kalkhoven, venture capitalist

== Law, government and politics ==
- Edward Archer, Australian politician
- Lord Bowness, Conservative politician
- Scroop Egerton, 1st Duke of Bridgewater, British peer and courtier
- Eddy Butler, far right politician
- Sir Nicholas Carew, 1st Baronet, politician, MP for Haslemere
- Sir Jeremy Cooke, High Court judge
- Lord Diplock, judge and Law Lord
- Lord Freeman, Conservative politician
- Lord Freud, senior government advisor on welfare reform
- Sir Daniel Harvey, merchant, politician, Ambassador to the Ottoman Empire
- David Kerr, Labour politician
- Sir Keith Lindblom, High Court judge
- Charles Jenkinson, 3rd Earl of Liverpool, politician
- Lord Percy of Alnwick, MP for Marlborough, Portsmouth and Northumberland
- Lord Prentice, politician
- Sir Peter Schofield, civil servant, Former Permanent Secretary for the Department for Work and Pensions
- William Style, barrister and legal author
- Lord Trend, civil servant
- Lord Tope, Liberal Democrat politician
- Richard Vaughan, 2nd Earl of Carbery, Welsh soldier, peer and politician
- Lord Wedderburn of Charlton, Labour politician, lawyer
- Timothy Fancourt, Barrister and High Court judge

== Media, music and the arts ==
- Leonard Barden, chess columnist
- Eric Barker, writer and comedian
- Derren Brown, illusionist
- Jamie Bulloch, translator
- Loyle Carner, hip hop musician
- Kit Connor, actor
- Tim Davie, Director-General, BBC
- Basil Dean, actor, film and theatrical producer/director
- Robert Dougall, BBC newsreader and President of the Royal Society for the Protection of Birds (RSPB)
- Paul England (1893–1968), actor, singer, director, author, and translator
- Sir Newman Flower, publisher and author
- Neil Gaiman, author
- Jonathan "JB" Gill, member of the band JLS
- Tim Gudgin, BBC radio presenter and voiceover artist
- Martin Jarvis, actor
- Gordon Kaufmann, British-American architect
- Robert Keable, novelist and priest
- Michael Legat, author, publisher
- Conrad Leonard, composer and pianist
- Peter Ling, creator of TV soap Crossroads
- Anthony McCall, avant-garde artist
- Jason Okundaye, journalist, author
- Tarik O'Regan, composer
- Gary Taphouse, Sky Sports football commentator
- Jon Pearn, Grammy Award & Ivor Novello Award nominated record producer
- Steve Punt, writer, comedian and actor
- Leon Quartermaine, stage actor
- Jeremy Sams, director, writer, orchestrator and lyricist
- Mark Shivas, film and television producer
- Alan Truscott, bridge player, columnist, author
- William Waterhouse, bassoonist and musicologist
- Colin Watson, author
- Pete Wiggs, musician.
- Harcourt Williams, actor and director
- Guy Woolfenden, conductor and composer with around 150 scores for the Royal Shakespeare Company
- Andrew Koji, actor

== Military ==
- Group Captain John "Cats Eyes" Cunningham, RAF officer and ace pilot
- Air Vice-Marshal John Downey, RAF officer and fighter pilot
- Bryan Draper, RAF officer and flying ace
- Captain Alex Eida RHA, army officer, killed in action in Afghanistan, 1 August 2006
- Anthony Eyre, RAF officer and flying ace
- Captain Kenneth Lockwood, prisoner at Colditz, honorary secretary of Colditz Association
- Lieutenant colonel Colin "Mad Mitch" Mitchell, Commanding Officer 1st Battalion The Argyll and Sutherland Highlanders, politician, founder of the Halo Trust
- Vice Admiral Henry Palmer, officer, Comptroller of Royal Navy
- Air Vice-Marshal Sir Frederick Hugh Sykes, officer, Chief of the Air Staff and Governor of Bombay
- Sir Arthur Tedder, 1st Baron Tedder, Marshal of the Royal Air Force, Deputy Supreme Commander of D-Day, and Deputy Supreme Commander of Allied Forces in Europe under Dwight D. Eisenhower. Tedder was the Allied witness who signed the German Instrument of Surrender in May 1945, ending the Second World War in Europe.
- General Sir Peter Wall, officer and former head of the British Army as Chief of the General Staff

== Sport ==
- Edwin Bailey, cricketer (Europeans)
- Geoffrey Bozman, cricketer (Europeans)
- Troy Brown, footballer, Rotherham United and Wales under-21
- Rory Burns, cricketer Surrey CCC and England
- Danny Cipriani, rugby union player, England Rugby and Sale Sharks
- Ernest Cowdrey, cricketer, father of Colin Cowdrey
- Vivian Crawford, cricketer, England, Surrey CCC and Leicestershire CCC
- Elliot Daly, rugby union player, England Rugby, Barbarians, British and Irish Lions and Saracens
- Laurie Evans, cricketer, Warwickshire CCC
- Mark Foster, rugby union player, Exeter Chiefs
- Lee Hills, footballer, Crystal Palace
- Callum Hudson-Odoi, footballer, Nottingham Forest
- George Keay, cricketer
- Tom Lancefield, cricketer, Surrey CCC
- Tosh Masson, rugby union player, Harlequins
- George Merrick, rugby union player, Clermont Auvergne
- George Pilkington Mills, English racing cyclist
- Victor Moses, footballer, Chelsea and Nigeria
- Jamal Musiala, footballer, Bayern Munich
- Lawrence Okoye, American Football Player, San Francisco 49ers, British discus record holder
- Gordon Orford, cricketer, Europeans
- Jason Roy, cricketer, Surrey CCC and England
- Dominic Sibley, cricketer, Surrey and Warwickshire CCC
- Jamie Smith, cricketer, Surrey CCC and England
- Stan South, rugby union player, Exeter Chiefs
- Matthew Spriegel, cricketer, Northamptonshire CCC
- Robert Strang, English cricketer
- Raman Subba Row, cricketer, England, Surrey and Northamptonshire
- Adam Thompstone, rugby union player, Leicester Tigers
- Richard Thorpe, rugby union player, Leicester Tigers & Canada
- Bertrand Traoré, footballer, Sunderland
- Dudley Tredger, British Épée fencer
- Freddie van den Bergh, cricketer, Surrey CCC
- Harry Williams, rugby union player, Exeter Chiefs, England Rugby
- Marland Yarde, rugby union player, Sale Sharks
- Joseph Choong, modern pentathlete and Olympic gold medallist

== Other ==
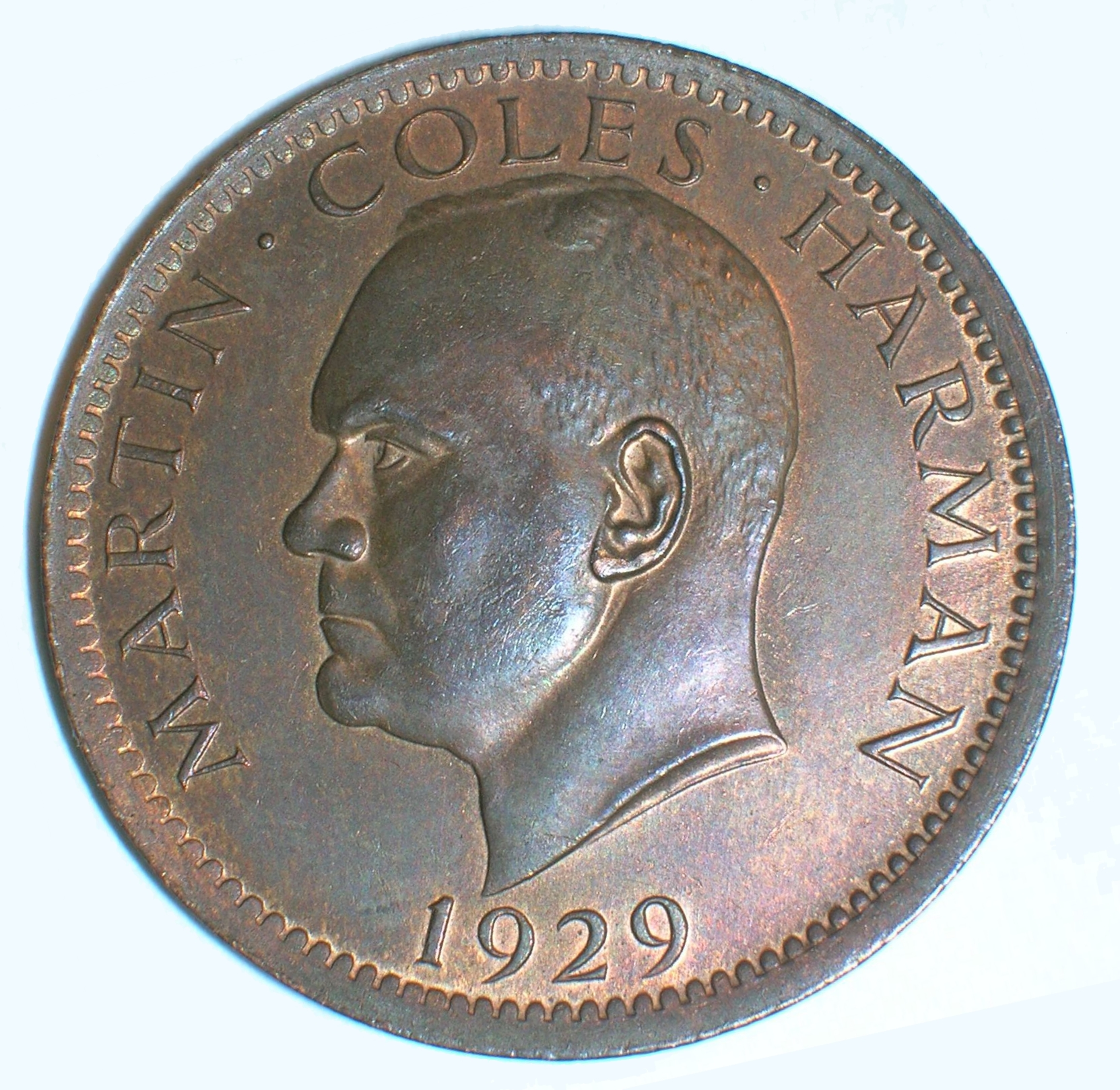
A One Puffin coin of 1929, bearing the portrait of Martin Coles Harman, Old Whitgiftian and self-styled King of Lundy.

- Colin Buchanan, priest, former Bishop of Aston and Bishop of Woolwich
- Roberta Cowell, racing driver, World War 2 fighter pilot and the first known British transsexual woman to undergo sex reassignment surgery
- Harold Davidson, "The Rector of Stiffkey", killed by a lion
- Martin Coles Harman, self-styled King of Lundy
- Charles Howard, 3rd Earl of Nottingham, aristocrat
- Michael Manktelow, priest, former Bishop of Basingstoke
- James Roxburgh, priest, former Bishop of Barking
- Francis Skeat, church stained glass designer
- Graham Smith, priest, Dean of Norwich till 2013
- Cyril Uwins, test pilot
