= Ernest Cowdrey =

English cricketer and tea plantation owner

Personal information
- Full name: Ernest Arthur Cowdrey
- Born: 14 January 1902; Calcutta, Bengal Presidency, British India
- Died: 5 October 1954 (aged 52); Sutton, Surrey, England
- Batting: Unknown
- Bowling: Unknown
- Relatives: Colin Cowdrey (son); Chris Cowdrey (grandson); Graham Cowdrey (grandson); Fabian Cowdrey (great-grandson)

Domestic team information
- Years: Team
- 1926/27: Europeans

Career statistics
Competition	First-class
Matches	1
Runs scored	36
Batting average	36.00
100s/50s	–/–
Top score	27*
Balls bowled	66
Wickets	0
Bowling average	–
5 wickets in innings	–
10 wickets in match	–
Best bowling	–
Catches/stumpings	–/–
- Source: ESPNcricinfo, 7 November 2021

Ernest Arthur Cowdrey (14 January 1902 – 5 October 1954) was an English first-class cricketer and tea plantation owner in British India. He was the father of the England Test cricketer Colin Cowdrey.

== Life and cricket ==
The son of Ernest Charles Cowdrey, he was born in British India at Calcutta in January 1902. He was educated at Whitgift School, where he played cricket and showed promise as a cricketer, moving his way up through the age groups at Beddington Cricket Club in Surrey. Cowdrey harboured dreams of playing the game professionally, but did not progress his cricket to that level.

After finishing his education, Cowdrey found employment at a bank in the City of London, before progressing to stockbroking where he bought and sold tea stocks. He met his future wife, Kathleen Mary Taylor, at Beddington Cricket Club. After marrying, the couple moved to India, with Cowdrey setting up a tea plantation high in the Nilgiri Mountains, 100 miles from Bangalore.

He played first-class cricket in India for the Europeans cricket team, making a single appearance against the Indians at Madras in January 1927 in the Madras Presidency Match. Batting twice in the match, he was dismissed for nine runs in the Europeans' first innings by M. Venkataramanjulu, while in their second innings he was unbeaten on 27. In the Indians' first innings, he bowled 11 overs without taking a wicket. Cowdrey would often drive ten hours to Madras to play club cricket, a perilous undertaking on the narrow and unpaved roads in the mountains.

The Great Depression hit the tea industry hard, with prices dropping by over 50%. Nevertheless, Cowdrey was able to maintain the plantation, though the Second World War again hit the plantation, with the young English managers joining the war effort.

In later life he suffered from a heart problems. He died in England in October 1954 at Sutton.

== Family ==
Cowdrey was the founding member a cricketing dynasty. His son Colin was born on the tea plantation in December 1932 and would go on to captain Kent and England in Test cricket. Many stories circulate about Cowdrey's early relationship with his son, including his determination for Colin to become a professional cricketer. He also wrote to a friend in England asking him to place Colin's name down for membership of the Marylebone Cricket Club shortly after he was born. (Colin's first name was actually Michael, meaning his initials were MCC).

Colin would go on to have two sons who would play cricket, Chris and Graham; Chris would also play for and captain England in Test cricket as well as Kent. Ernest Cowdrey's great-grandson Fabian Cowdrey also played for Kent.
