= Julius Cowdrey =

British singer (born 1993)

- Born: Julius Lindahl Cowdrey; 30 January 1993 (age 33); Canterbury, Kent, England
- Genres: Pop
- Occupation: Singer

Julius Lindahl Cowdrey (born 30 January 1993) is an English pop singer. He is best known for appearing on the reality television show Made in Chelsea. In 2016, he released a single "7 Roads (I See You)".

== Early life ==
Cowdrey was born in Canterbury, Kent on 30 January 1993 to Chris Cowdrey and Christel (née Holst-Sande); he is of Swedish descent from his mother's side. Cowdrey comes from a cricketing dynasty with his father Chris and grandfather, life peer, Colin Cowdrey, both captaining England. His twin brother, Fabian Cowdrey, followed the family tradition and played for Kent County Cricket Club for five years. Julius discovered his talent and passion for music at a very young age whilst singing in the Tonbridge School choir and began songwriting at the age of 16; following in the footsteps of his mother, herself a jazz singer.

== Career ==
In 2013, Cowdrey introduced live music to London's West End nightclub Mahiki, and became a regular headliner at music venues in London, including The Troubadour. Following his success in London, Cowdrey began to split his time between London and New York, where he spent a lot of time working on his music, and was eventually asked to headline rooftop parties in Los Angeles.

After a few years honing his craft, Cowdrey's debut single "7 Roads (I See You)" was released in November 2016, where it reached to Number 1 on the UK official iTunes singer-songwriter chart and Number 2 on the Spotify UK Viral Chart.
