= Graham Cowdrey =

English cricketer (1964–2020)

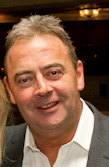

Personal information
- Full name: Graham Robert Cowdrey
- Born: 27 June 1964; Farnborough, Kent, England
- Died: 10 November 2020 (aged 56)
- Nickname: Van
- Height: 5 ft 10 in (1.78 m)
- Batting: Right-handed
- Bowling: Right-arm medium
- Relatives: Colin Cowdrey (father); Chris Cowdrey (brother); Fabian Cowdrey (nephew); Julius Cowdrey (nephew)

Domestic team information
- Years: Team
- 1984–1998: Kent

Career statistics
Competition	First-class	List A
Matches	179	261
Runs scored	8,858	5,142
Batting average	34.73	26.10
100s/50s	17/46	3/24
Top score	147	105*
Balls bowled	1,206	1,279
Wickets	12	35
Bowling average	72.66	26.28
5 wickets in innings	0	0
10 wickets in match	0	0
Best bowling	1/5	4/15
Catches/stumpings	97/–	80/–
- Source: Cricinfo, 7 June 2016

Graham Robert Cowdrey (27 June 1964 – 10 November 2020) was an English cricketer.

== Biography ==
Cowdrey was the third son of cricketer and life peer Colin Cowdrey, Baron Cowdrey of Tonbridge and his first wife Penny Chiesman. He was born in Farnborough in 1964 and educated at Wellesley House and Tonbridge School. Cowdrey matriculated at Hatfield College, Durham, but left his general arts degree after one year when he failed an anthropology exam. He then opted to follow family tradition by pursuing a cricket career.

He played for Kent County Cricket Club as an attacking batsman in first-class and List A cricket from 1984 to 1998. In his 450 appearances for Kent, he scored over 14,000 runs. His best season was in 1995 that year, he helped Kent reach the Benson & Hedges Cup final and win the Sunday League, and finished the season with a List A average of 53.90.

He had two sons, Michael and Alexander, and a daughter, Penelope. His nickname of "Van" came from Van Morrison, his favourite musician.

Cowdrey worked as a Cricket Liaison Officer for the England and Wales Cricket Board.

== Death ==
Cowdrey died on 10 November 2020, aged 56, after a short illness.
