= Fabian Cowdrey =

English cricketer

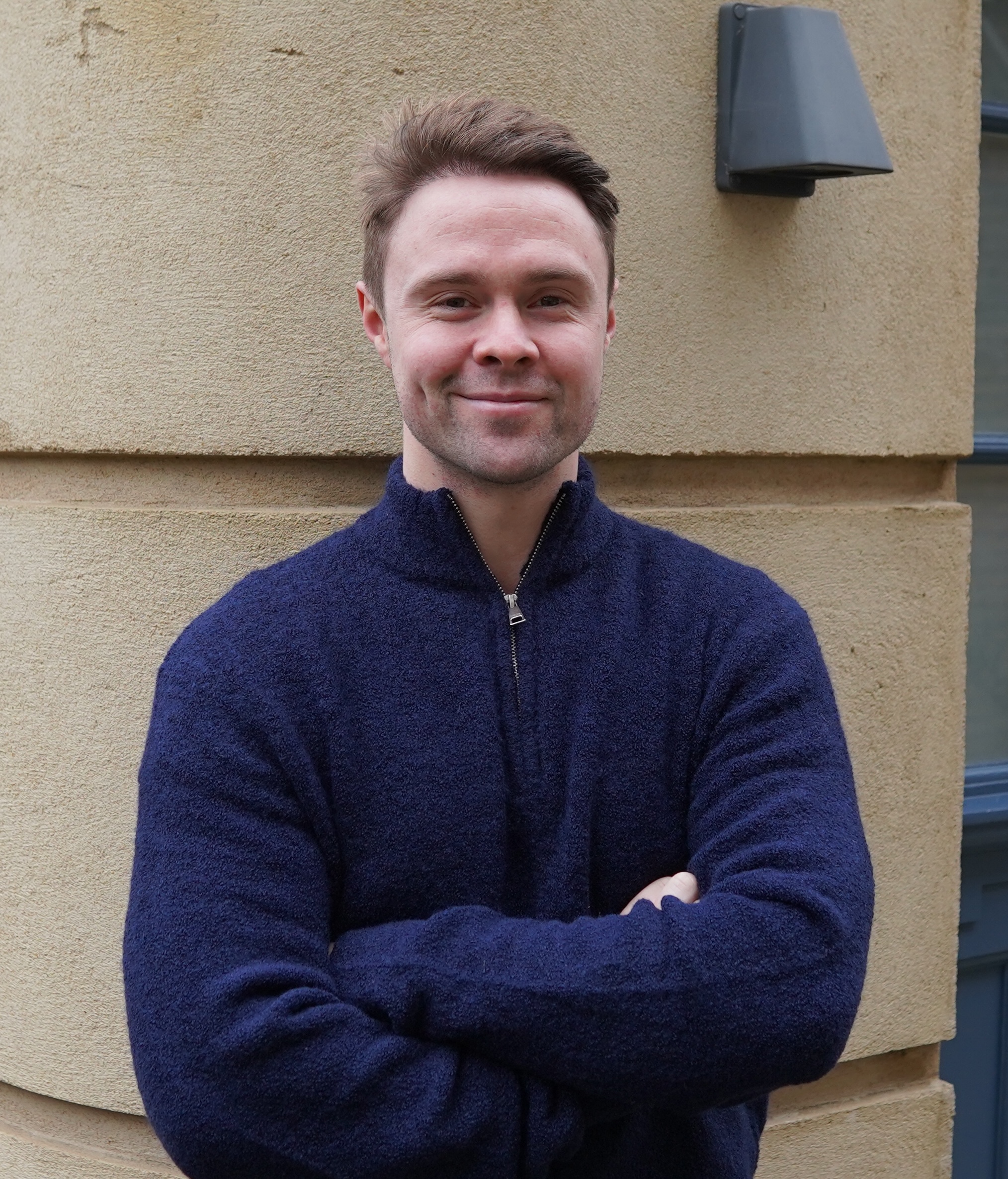

Personal information
- Full name: Fabian Kruuse Cowdrey
- Born: 30 January 1993 (age 33); Canterbury, Kent
- Batting: Right-handed
- Bowling: Slow left-arm orthodox
- Role: All-rounder
- Relatives: Julius Cowdrey (brother); Chris Cowdrey (father); Graham Cowdrey (uncle); Colin Cowdrey (grandfather); Ernest Cowdrey (great-grandfather)

Domestic team information
- Years: Team
- 2011–2016: Kent (squad no. 30)
- 2013–2014: Cardiff MCCU
- FC debut: 5 April 2013 Cardiff MCCU v Glamorgan
- LA debut: 11 August 2013 Kent v Worcestershire

Career statistics
Competition	FC	LA	T20
Matches	12	25	35
Runs scored	372	555	577
Batting average	18.60	27.75	19.89
100s/50s	0/2	0/4	0/3
Top score	62	75	71
Balls bowled	172	648	449
Wickets	3	14	20
Bowling average	43.00	41.07	30.80
5 wickets in innings	0	0	0
10 wickets in match	0	0	0
Best bowling	3/59	3/32	3/18
Catches/stumpings	5/–	11/–	12/–
- Source: CricInfo, 11 July 2016

Fabian Kruuse Cowdrey (born 30 January 1993) is an English former professional cricketer who played for Kent County Cricket Club. He was the first third-generation player to play for the county, following his father, Chris Cowdrey, and grandfather Colin Cowdrey. Cowdrey was often employed as an all-rounder, batting right-handed and bowling slow left arm orthodox deliveries.

== Cricket career ==
Cowdrey was awarded a first-team contract in October 2011 before making his First XI debut for Kent in May 2012 against Oxford MCCU. He made his first-class cricket debut playing for Cardiff MCC University against Glamorgan in April 2013 before making his competitive debut for Kent later the same summer in the 2013 Friends Life t20. He appeared for the county in the 2013 Yorkshire Bank 40 later in the season before making his first-class debut for Kent in June 2014.

After playing Grade cricket for Sunshine Coast Scorchers in Queensland over the 2013–14 English off-season, Cowdrey captained Western Suburbs in Sydney Grade Cricket during the 2015–16 season.

Cowdrey's 2016 season was cut short in July when he had an emergency appendectomy. On the eve of the 2017 season he left Kent by mutual consent with Cowdrey later saying that his "love for the game is gone, my heart's not in it". In April 2017 Cowdrey made his first appearance on BBC Radio Kent as a cricket commentator, covering Kent's match against Derbyshire at Canterbury and later in the year began writing for The Cricketer.

== Family ==
Cowdrey's father is former Kent and England captain Chris Cowdrey. His grandfather, Colin, Lord Cowdrey also captained both teams and played 114 Test matches for England, the first man to make 100 Test appearances. He was honoured for his services to cricket, the first English cricketer to be honoured in this way. His uncle, Graham Cowdrey, also played for Kent and his great-grandfather, Ernest Cowdrey made one first-class cricket appearance in the 1920s.

Cowdrey has a twin brother, Julius, who is a professional musician and reality TV character, joining Made in Chelsea in 2016. Both brothers attended Tonbridge School, as did their father, uncle and grandfather, Fabian exceeding his grandfather's total of runs scored for the school and beating his record of most runs scored in a year. Cowdrey wrote the lyrics for his brother's debut single during 2016 and, following his release from Kent, aimed to support his brother and to continue as a lyricist.
