= Herbert Hawkins =

Herbert Hawkins may refer to:

- Herbert Hawkins (politician), English-born Australian politician
- Herbert Hawkins (cricketer), English cricketer
- Herbert Leader Hawkins, British geologist
