= Harry Ledger =

English rugby union player

Harry Ledger (born July 1994 (age 31–32)) is an English rugby union player for the Premiership side Exeter Chiefs. He also played for the England U19 Rugby Team. He plays as a flanker. Ledger attended Whitgift School.
