= John William Henry Eyre =

British bacteriologist and ophthalmologist

Professor John William Henry Eyre FRSE FZS
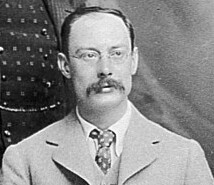
- Eyre as a member of the Mediterranean Fever Commission

Professor of Bacteriology, University of London
- In office 1920–1934

Personal details
- Born: 18 July 1869 London, England
- Died: 17 February 1944 (aged 74)
- Occupation: Bacteriologist, ophthalmologist

John William Henry Eyre (18 July 1869 – 17 February 1944) was a British bacteriologist and ophthalmologist, specialising in the bacteriology of the eye.

== Life ==
He was born in London on 18 July 1869 the son of John Eyre. He was educated privately and at Whitgift School in London. In 1889, he entered Guy's Hospital Medical School which linked to a Diploma at the University of Durham graduating MB in 1893, followed by a course in Public Health at Cambridge University.

In 1899, he was elected a Fellow of the Royal Society of Edinburgh. His proposers were Robert Howden, Sir Thomas Oliver, Angus MacGillivray, and Sir German Sims Woodhead

In 1899, he moved to Charing Cross Hospital and in 1900 became the first recipient of the Ernest Hart Memorial Research Scholarship. In 1906, he spent the summer in Malta having been co-opted onto the Royal Society Commission on Mediterranean Fever. He was vice-president of the Royal Microscopical Society.

From 1920 to 1934, he was Professor of Bacteriology at the University of London (attached to Guy's Hospital). He retired in 1934 and died on 17 February 1944.

== Publications ==
- The Elements of Bacteriological Technique (1902) several later editions
- Serums, Vaccines and Toxines in Treatment and Diagnoses (1910)
