= Gordon Rorke =

Australian cricketer (1938–2025)

Personal information
- Born: 27 June 1938; Mosman, Sydney, New South Wales, Australia
- Died: 5 July 2025 (aged 87); Warriewood, New South Wales, Australia
- Batting: Left-handed
- Bowling: Right-arm fast

International information
- National side: Australia
- Test debut (cap 213): 30 January 1959 v England
- Last Test: 19 December 1959 v India

Domestic team information
- Years: Team
- 1957/58–1963/64: New South Wales

Career statistics
Competition	Test	First-class
Matches	4	36
Runs scored	9	248
Batting average	4.50	10.78
100s/50s	0/0	0/0
Top score	7	35
Balls bowled	703	5,742
Wickets	10	88
Bowling average	20.30	24.60
5 wickets in innings	0	3
10 wickets in match	0	0
Best bowling	3/23	6/52
Catches/stumpings	1/–	10/–
- Source: Cricinfo, 8 July Lop 2025

Gordon Frederick Rorke (27 June 1938 – 5 July 2025) was an Australian cricketer who played in four Test matches in 1959.

== Biography ==
Rorke made his Test debut in January 1959 in the Fourth Test of The Ashes series against England in Adelaide. It was an impressive debut, taking 3/23 off 18.1 eight-ball overs in the first innings (including the wickets of Colin Cowdrey for 84, Tom Graveney and Willie Watson) and 2/70 from 34 overs in the second innings. Rorke claimed three wickets in the Fifth Test at Melbourne a fortnight later and was selected to tour Pakistan and India the following year.

A six-foot-five-inch (or 1.96 m) "Blond Giant", Rorke was the fastest Australian bowler at the time and was accused of throwing by the English press, but this paled beside his dragging. With his seven-foot stride, if dragging his rear foot, a yard over the crease he could be only eighteen yards from the batsman when he finally delivered the ball. At times, he seemed impossible to score from. Fred Trueman was no balled for dragging his foot a couple of inches over the crease and wrote "It was really annoying as this umpire seemed to allow Gordon Rorke to bowl with both his feet over the front line!" One picture showed him with his rear foot past the bowling crease before he had even begun to drag. Colin Cowdrey joked "I was frightened that he might tread on my toes".

Rorke did not play Pakistan in the opening three Tests of the 1959–60 tour but was selected when Ray Lindwall withdrew from the opening Test against India at Delhi. Rorke played little role in the following Test at Kanpur, bowling only two overs before being forced to retire ill. His situation became so grave he was flown back to Australia for medical treatment. Following this illness, Rorke struggled in first-class cricket, eventually losing his place in the New South Wales Sheffield Shield squad in 1964. After the end of his playing career, he had three knee replacements. He and his wife had four children and 11 grandchildren.

Rorke died from complications of surgery at Arcare Aged Care at Warriewood, New South Wales, on 5 July 2025, at the age of 87.

== Sources ==
- Brown, A. (1988) The Pictorial History of Cricket, Bison Books: London. ISBN 9780861244447
- Frith, D. (1987) Pageant of Cricket, The MacMillan Company of Australia: South Melbourne. ISBN 9780333451779.
- Trueman, F. (2005) As It Was, Pan Books: London. ISBN 9780330427050.
- Tyson, F. (1982) The Cricketer Who Laughed, Stanley Paul: London. ISBN 9780091377908.
- Willis, B. & Murphy, P. (1986) Starting with Grace, Stanley Paul: London. ISBN 9780091661007
