= Tosh Masson =

English rugby union player

- Born: Tajiv Singh Masson; 27 February 1985 (age 41)
- Height: 1.80 m (5 ft 11 in)
- Weight: 92 kg (14 st 7 lb)
- School: Whitgift School

Rugby union career
- Position: Centre
Amateur team(s)
Years	Team	Apps	(Points)
- Beccehamians RFC
Senior career
Years	Team	Apps	(Points)
2005–2010	Harlequins	45	(30)
International career
Years	Team	Apps	(Points)
2006	England U21		

Tajiv Singh Masson (born 27 February 1985), known as Tosh Masson, is a rugby union player who played for Harlequins in Premiership Rugby, playing primarily as a centre.

He is the only Sikh to have played professional rugby. His performances for Harlequins particularly impressed club coach Dean Richards in 2007.

In 2010 he was nominated for British Asian Sports Personality of the year, and underwent ankle surgery even though he was out of contract in the summer. He was released by Harlequins and then completed a degree at Bath University.
