= Herbert Hawkins (cricketer) =

English cricketer

Personal information
- Full name: Herbert Hervey Baines Hawkins
- Born: 9 January 1876; Streatham Hill, Surrey, England
- Died: 1 January 1933 (aged 56); Trincomalee, British Ceylon
- Batting: Right-handed
- Bowling: Right-arm medium

Domestic team information
- Years: Team
- 1896–1899: Cambridge University

Career statistics
Competition	First-class
Matches	20
Runs scored	159
Batting average	7.95
100s/50s	–/–
Top score	15*
Balls bowled	2,402
Wickets	48
Bowling average	23.81
5 wickets in innings	2
10 wickets in match	–
Best bowling	7/45
Catches/stumpings	14/–
- Source: Cricinfo, 11 July 2022

Herbert Hervey Baines Hawkins (9 January 1876 – 1 January 1933) was an English first-class cricketer who played in 20 matches for Cambridge University between 1896 and 1899. He was born at Streatham Hill in London and died at Trincomalee in Sri Lanka.

Hawkins was educated at Whitgift School, then called Whitgift Grammar, and at Trinity College, Cambridge. As a first-class cricketer, he was primarily a bowler: a tall right-arm medium pace bowler and a right-handed lower-order batsman. In his first two years at Cambridge, he suffered from the bowling and batting riches available to the university cricket team: in his single match in 1896, he bowled just two expensive overs, and in 1897, given two games, he bowled in only one of the four innings played by Cambridge's opponents. Better opportunities came in 1898, when Hawkins impressed in the senior trial match by taking 11 wickets in a 12-a-side game. In another 12-a-side match, this time a first-class game between Cambridge University and the Marylebone Cricket Club (MCC), he was instrumental in securing a narrow Cambridge victory by taking seven wickets for 45 runs, and he followed that up with five for 37 against Surrey in the very next match. That led to his selection for the 1898 University Match against Oxford University, though he had no success in the game. In 1899, he was again a regular member of the Cambridge first team, and though his bowling figures for the season were less successful than in 1898, he had a better game in the University Match, taking four wickets, albeit expensively. That match was his final appearance in first-class cricket.

Hawkins graduated from Cambridge University with a Bachelor of Arts degree in 1898 and this was upgraded to a Master of Arts in 1903. He became a schoolmaster in France, and an obituary in 1933 states that he attempted to introduce something of the ethos of the English public school into France, though the work was stopped by the outbreak of the First World War. He served in the Royal Garrison Artillery in the war, reaching the rank of captain. After the war, he became the headmaster of a preparatory school for the children of colonial administrators at Nuwara Eliya in Sri Lanka; he was still in post when he and his wife were drowned while bathing on New Year's Day, 1933, at Trincomalee.
