= Colin Cowdrey =

English cricketer (1932–2000)

The Right Honourable The Lord Cowdrey of Tonbridge CBE
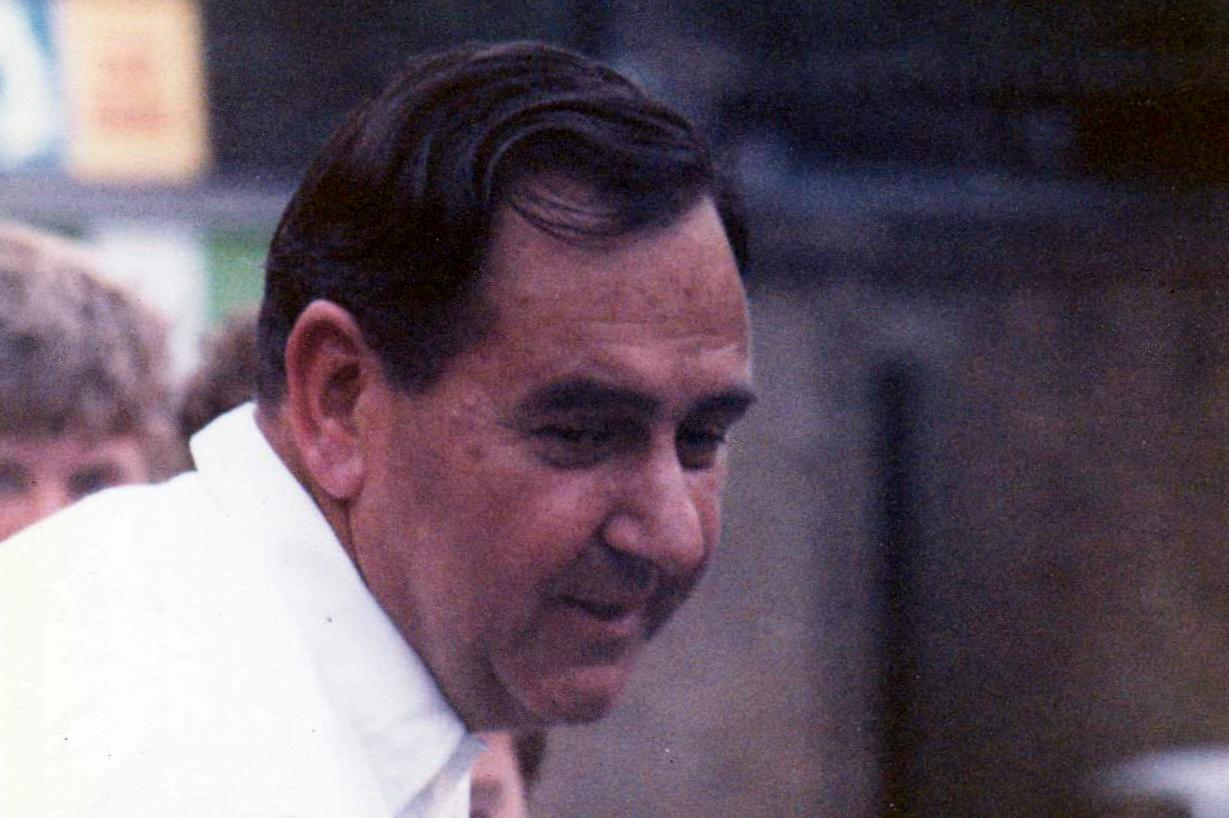
- Cowdrey at The Oval in 1980

Personal information
- Full name: Michael Colin Cowdrey
- Born: 24 December 1932; Ootacamund, Madras Presidency, British India
- Died: 4 December 2000 (aged 67); Littlehampton, West Sussex, England
- Batting: Right-handed
- Bowling: Right-arm leg spin
- Role: Batsman

International information
- National side: England
- Test debut (cap 379): 26 November 1954 v Australia
- Last Test: 13 February 1975 v Australia
- Only ODI (cap 2): 5 January 1971 v Australia

Domestic team information
- Years: Team
- 1950–1976: Kent
- 1951–1960: Gentlemen
- 1952–1975: Marylebone Cricket Club
- 1952–1954: Oxford University

Career statistics
Competition	Test	ODI	FC	LA
Matches	114	1	692	87
Runs scored	7,624	1	42,719	1,978
Batting average	44.06	1.00	42.89	29.52
100s/50s	22/38	0/0	107/231	3/12
Top score	182	1	307	116
Balls bowled	119	–	4,876	59
Wickets	0	–	65	3
Bowling average	–	–	51.21	14.33
5 wickets in innings	–	–	0	0
10 wickets in match	–	–	0	0
Best bowling	–	–	4/22	1/0
Catches/stumpings	120/–	0/–	638/–	38/–
- Source: CricketArchive, 29 December 2022

Colin Cowdrey

1st President of International Cricket Council
- In office 1989–1993
- Preceded by: Position established
- Succeeded by: Clyde Walcott

Member of the House of Lords
- Lord Temporal
- Life peerage 18 July 1997 – 4 December 2000

Michael Colin Cowdrey, Baron Cowdrey of Tonbridge (24 December 1932 – 4 December 2000) was an English cricketer who played for Kent County Cricket Club from 1950 to 1976, and in 114 Test matches for England from 1954 to 1975. He was born in Ootacamund, Madras Presidency, British India and died in Littlehampton, West Sussex.

Cowdrey was a right-handed batsman who played in 692 first-class matches. He scored 42,719 career runs at an average of 42.89 runs per completed innings with a highest score of 307 as one of 107 centuries. He was an occasional right-arm leg spin bowler, taking 65 first-class wickets with a best innings return of 4/22. An outstanding slip fielder, he held 638 career catches. Cowdrey was the first player to make 100 appearances in Test cricket and also the first batsman to score a Test century, both home and away, against six other teams.

== Early life and school years ==
Colin Cowdrey was born on his family's tea plantation at Ootacamund, Madras Presidency, although his birthplace has often been misrecorded as Bangalore, 100 miles to the north. His father, Ernest Cowdrey, was a keen cricketer who had played in the Minor Counties Championship for Berkshire. Ernest made an application for Colin to join Marylebone Cricket Club while still an infant. Colin's mother was Molly Cowdrey (née Taylor), who played tennis and hockey. He had no schooling in India, but his father and the servants taught him how to play cricket from a very early age.

When Cowdrey was five, he was taken to England where he attended the Homefield Preparatory School in Sutton from 1938 to 1945. In 1945, aged 12, he went to Alf Gover's Cricket School for three weeks and his father enrolled him at Tonbridge School so that he could qualify for Kent County Cricket Club. On Gover's recommendation, Cowdrey was selected for the school's first team. In July 1946, aged thirteen, Cowdrey played at Lord's for Tonbridge School against Clifton College. He scored 75 and 44 and, bowling leg spin, took 3/58 and 5/33. Tonbridge won the match by two runs. The school later established the Cowdrey Scholarships for sporting excellence in his memory.

Cowdrey was asked to play for Kent Young Amateurs in 1948 and made 157 against Sussex Young Amateurs, 87 against Middlesex Young Amateurs and 79 against Surrey Young Amateurs. He was asked to join the Kent Second XI in 1949 and played three matches in August against Norfolk, Wiltshire and Devon in the Minor Counties Championship. In 1950, he was made captain of his school cricket team and scored 126* for the Public Schools XI against Combined Services at Lord's. Less than a week later, Kent selected Cowdrey for his first-class debut in a County Championship match against Derbyshire at the County Ground in Derby. He held a catch and took a wicket in Derbyshire's first innings of 345/6 declared. He was fifth in the Kent batting order and scored 15 in his debut innings before he was caught by Derbyshire captain Pat Vaulkhard off a ball by Cliff Gladwin. Kent were all out for 96 and Vaulkhard imposed the follow on. Cowdrey made Kent's top score of 26 in the second innings. He was bowled by Gladwin whose match return was 10/86. Kent were all out for 151 and Derbyshire won by an innings and 98 runs.

== First-class and international career ==
=== 1951 to 1954 ===
Cowdrey left Tonbridge School in the summer of 1951 and, having been offered an exhibition, became a student at the University of Oxford. He was there till the summer of 1954 and studied geography at Brasenose College. He joined the Oxford University Cricket Club and, in each season from 1952 to 1954, played for them in the early weeks and then for Kent till the end of the season. He captained the Oxford team in 1954.

Before going into residence at Oxford in the autumn of 1951, Cowdrey scored his maiden first-class century against them for the Free Foresters. This match was played at the University Parks 2–5 June and Cowdrey scored 143 at a run a minute in the first innings. Free Foresters totalled 317 all out but the university replied with 395/5 declared. In their second innings, Free Foresters scored 355 all out. Errol Holmes was the top scorer with 162 and Cowdrey contributed 39. Oxford needed 278 and won by 8 wickets. Cowdrey made his debut in the Gentlemen v Players series soon afterwards, playing for the Gentlemen. In his first match for them at North Marine Road, Scarborough, he scored 106. The match ended in a draw. In all matches, Cowdrey scored 1,189 runs in the 1951 season and was awarded his Kent county cap. He received the cap from team captain David Clark after an innings of 71 against the touring South Africans. At the age of eighteen, he was the youngest player to be capped by Kent.

=== First international tour ===
Cowdrey was a surprise choice for the England tour of Australia in 1954–55. He was called in to replace the injured Willie Watson. According to Cowdrey, England captain Len Hutton later told him that his selection was a gamble, but it was thought that his technique would be good on the hard Australian wickets. Frank Tyson recalled Hutton telling Cowdrey and himself that they would be secondary players on the tour, there to gain experience with probably no involvement in the Test series.

On the team's arrival in Perth, Cowdrey received a telegram that his father had died, but the team rallied round him and he played in the opening match against a local Western Australian Country XI. He scored 48* and took 4/35 with his leg breaks. The party moved on to Sydney where Cowdrey was selected to play against New South Wales. This became a key match in his career as he scored a century in each innings and thereby earned his place in the England team for the first Test, even though he failed in the next match against Queensland.

The first Test, Cowdrey's international debut, was played at the Brisbane Cricket Ground and Australia scored 601/8 declared after Hutton had won the toss and sent them in. England's batting collapsed in the first innings, though Cowdrey made 40, and they had to follow on. Cowdrey scored 10 in the second innings and England, with totals of 190 and 257 were unable to avoid a heavy defeat by an innings and 154 runs. After that, England staged a recovery and won the second Test at the Sydney Cricket Ground by 38 runs, having been 74 behind on first innings. In the second innings, Cowdrey (54) shared a fourth wicket partnership of 116 with Peter May (104) which enabled England to reach 296 and left Australia needing 223 to win. Frank Tyson and Brian Statham bowled them out for 184 to level the series.

In the third Test at the Melbourne Cricket Ground, England were in trouble at 41/4 and were rescued by Cowdrey's maiden Test century. He scored 102 out of 191 after sharing partnerships of 74 with Trevor Bailey and 54 with Godfrey Evans. Some writers have said this was the highlight of Cowdrey's career as it laid a foundation for eventual victory by 128 runs after Tyson, with a return of 7/27, shattered Australia's batting in their second innings. Among those who praised Cowdrey's performance were Bill O'Reilly, who said it was the best Test innings he had ever seen and, Tyson who doubted if Cowdrey had "ever scored a better hundred". Cowdrey made 102 of England's first innings of 191 and once again this was enough for Tyson to bowl his team to victory as the tourists took a 2–1 lead in the series.

Australia opened the fourth Test at the Adelaide Oval with a total of 323. In reply, England scored 341 including 79 by Cowdrey. Australia could only manage 111 in their second innings. Cowdrey was injured when the ball hit him in the face while he was fielding. He batted in the second innings and was out for 4 but the injury worsened and he was hospitalised for several days. England scored 97/5 to win the match by 5 wickets. The final Test at Sydney was drawn and so England won the series 3–1 to retain The Ashes.

=== 1955 to 1958 ===
On his return from Australia, Cowdrey decided to drop out of Oxford and concentrate on his cricket career. As he was no longer an undergraduate, he was called up for national service in the Royal Air Force. However, he was almost immediately discharged because of a hereditary disability of rigid toes, on which he had previously had an operation. Cowdrey cemented his place in the England team and took part in each of the home series during this period. He also went to South Africa in 1956–57. In 1957, during the Test series against West Indies, Cowdrey and May shared a fourth wicket partnership of 411 at Edgbaston. Cowdrey scored 154 and May 285*. At the time, it was the third highest stand in Test cricket.

Before the 1957 season, Cowdrey was appointed captain of the Kent team, succeeding Doug Wright. Kent finished 14th in the County Championship, winning six of their 28 matches. Playfair Cricket Annual commented that Cowdrey had "infused the right spirit" into the team but pointed out that Kent cricket was still well short of resurgence. Cowdrey only played in 18 matches because of international calls and, without him, the team's batting was weak.

=== 1958–59 to 1962 ===
Cowdrey replaced Trevor Bailey as Peter May's vice-captain for the 1958–59 tour of Australia. The Test series was a disaster for England, who lost 4–0. Cowdrey had one notable innings when he scored 100* in the Third Test at the Sydney Cricket Ground and helped England to save that match as a draw. In 1959, Cowdrey had a successful series against India and scored 160 in the third Test at Headingley. Cowdrey captained England for the first time on their tour of the West Indies in 1959–60 after May was seriously injured. He took over from May for the last two matches of the series. Both were drawn and England, who had won the second Test, took the series 1–0.

With May out of action for the whole of 1960, Cowdrey captained England in the series against South Africa and won it 3–0. South Africa nearly won the last Test at The Oval after dismissing England for 155 and then scoring 479/9 declared. Cowdrey opened the England second innings with Geoff Pullar and they shared a first wicket stand of 290 which saved the match. Cowdrey scored 155 and Pullar 175.

May returned in 1961 and was expected to take back his captaincy, but declared himself unfit. Cowdrey was hurriedly brought to Lords and was told he would take over only a few days before the First Test. Although Richie Benaud had beaten England 4–0 in the last Ashes series the 1961 Australians were considered to be the weakest sent to England with Benaud and Alan Davidson struggling with injuries and many players unused to English conditions. They nearly upset England in the First Test at Edgbaston, leading by 321 runs in the first innings and Ted Dexter had to save the game with an innings of 180. Before the Second Test at Lords Cowdrey made 149 and 121 for Kent against the tourists and was 7 runs from victory when the game ended. May returned to the England team, but insisted that Cowdrey be captain despite pressure from the selectors. Benaud was unable to play, but the Australians under Neil Harvey rose to the occasion, Davidson taking 5/42 in the first innings, Bill Lawry making his maiden Test century of 130 and Garth McKenzie taking 5/37 to clear up the second innings in their 5 wicket victory. May agreed to lead England in the Third Test at Headingley and Cowdrey made 93 and 22 in a low scoring match as Fred Trueman took 11/93 to even the series. Cowdrey missed the Fourth Test at Old Trafford with a fever, where Australia won a nail-biting match to retain the Ashes. May thought England would have won if Cowdrey had played, even if he wasn't fit, but he returned for the drawn Fifth Test at the Oval.

The Ashes series had been a disappointment and Cowdrey decided to miss the tough tour of India and Pakistan, which was led by Ted Dexter. He lost to India 2–0, but beat Pakistan 1–0 and made 712 Test runs (71.20) on the tour, including his highest Test score of 205. May returned to play for Surrey, but refused to play for England and retired from cricket after a few games in 1963. When Pakistan toured England in 1962 Dexter was made captain for the First Test, winning by an innings and 24 runs (Cowdrey making 159) and the Second Test, which was won by 9 wickets. Cowdrey replaced him in the Third Test as the selectors considered their options for the forthcoming tour of Australia and he won by an innings and 117 runs. When Cowdrey was made captain in the final Gentleman v Players match at Lord's it looked like he would be chosen, but was forced to withdraw because of kidney stones and Dexter put in charge. However, he found a new rival in the old Sussex captain the Reverend David Sheppard, who was willing to take a sabbatical from his church mission in the East End to tour Australia. Sheppard made 112 for the Gentlemen and was chosen for the tour, but Dexter was confirmed as captain for the last two Tests against Pakistan and the forthcoming tour of Australia and New Zealand with Cowdrey as vice-captain. Cowdrey recovered to open the batting in the Fifth Test and make his highest Test score of 182, adding 238 with Dexter (172) and ending the series with 409 runs (81.80).

=== 1962–63 to 1967 ===
The tour manager Bernard Fitzalan-Howard, 16th Duke of Norfolk joined the team with three of his daughters and announced "You may dance with my daughters. You may take them out and wine them and dine them, but that is all you may do", though years later Cowdrey would marry the eldest, Lady Anne. Cowdrey had a poor start to the tour and made three successive ducks, which Jack Fingleton blamed on his fondness for golf. However, Cowdrey made the highest score of his career against South Australia on Christmas Eve (his birthday). He caressed his way to 307 in 369 minutes, beating Frank Woolley's 305 not out against Tasmania in 1911–12 as the highest score by a tourist in Australia; it was the highest first-class score in Australia for 18 years. Cowdrey added 103 runs with David Sheppard (81), 98 with Ken Barrington, then stroked 344 runs with fellow stylist Tom Graveney (122 not out), striking 4 sixes and 29 fours, until he was out and Dexter declared on 586/5. Fresh from his triumph at Adelaide Cowdrey made his only century of the series in the Second Test at Melbourne after joining Dexter at 19/2. They withstood Alan Davidson's burst of speed, but the other bowlers failed to trouble them and by stealing quick ones, twos and threes they rebuilt the innings. Dexter was out for 93, but the stand had made 175 runs and Cowdrey made 113, his third and highest century in Australia, but the celebrations were short lived as he hooked into the hands of Peter Burge off Garth McKenzie. In the second innings he took 30 minutes to score after being dropped off his first ball, but made 52 not out and hit the winning runs to give England a 1–0 lead.

Despite Cowdrey's first innings of 85, Australia won the Third Test to level the series and keep the Ashes, as the final two Tests were drawn. He finished third in the averages with 397 runs (43.77). The tour continued in New Zealand where Cowdrey made 292 runs (146.00) in the three Tests, which England won 3–0. Cowdrey made 86 in the First at Auckland, 128 not out in the Second at Wellington and 43 and 35 not out in the Third at Christchurch. The 128 not out at Wellington made him the first batsman to make a century against six countries, having already made hundreds against Australia, South Africa, the West Indies, India and Pakistan. He made an unbeaten stand of 163 with the wicket-keeper Alan Smith (69 not out) which was a Test record for the 9th wicket until beaten by Asif Iqbal and Intikhab Alam, who made 190 for the 9th wicket against England at the Oval in 1967.

In 1963 Frank Worrell led an exciting West Indies team on their tour of England. They won the First Test at Old Trafford by an innings, with Cowdrey being bowled round his legs by Hall for 4 after swaying away from a delivery which kept lower than he expected. The Second Test at Lord's was one of the best he played in. Fred Trueman took 6/100 and Cowdrey three catches to dismiss the tourists for 301 and the captain Ted Dexter thrashed Wes Hall and Charlie Griffith round the ground for 70 off 75 balls in England's reply of 297. Dexter couldn't field due to an injury taken when batting so Cowdrey led the team and took 3 more catches as Trueman took 5/52 and the West Indies' 229 relied almost entirely on Basil Butcher's 133. Needing 234 to win England were reduced to 31/3, but had recovered to 72/3 when Cowdrey fended a bouncer from Hall off his face and broke his wrist, retiring hurt on 19. Ken Barrington (60) and Brian Close (70) took England to the verge of victory and when Derek Shackleton was run out in the last over they were 228/9, needing five runs to tie, six runs to win, one wicket to lose or to survive two balls for a draw. Cowdrey returned to the crease with his arm in plaster and stood at the non-striker's end while Dave Allen blocked the last two balls for a draw. England won the Third Test, but lost the series 3–1 and Cowdrey was unable to play for the rest of the season.

England was to tour India and Pakistan again and Cowdrey was asked to captain the tour, but declined as his arm had not fully healed. Ted Dexter also took a rest and M.J.K. Smith led the team, which soon ran into difficulties as illness and injury reduced them to ten men and they considered calling up the broadcaster Henry Blofeld. Cowdrey was contacted by Lord's to recommend a replacement batsman and as the batsmen he would have suggested were contracted to play in South Africa he volunteered to join the team himself. On arrival he was immediately chosen for the Third Test without any match practice (this happened again in Australia in 1974–75), but took three catches and made 107 and 13 not out for a draw. He made 151 in the Fourth Test and 38 in the Fifth to end with 309 runs (103.00) and England survived the series 0–0, the first full Test series which England drew all their matches, but the third time India had managed this.

Dexter was back in charge in the rain-soaked 1964 Ashes series. Cowdrey played in the First and Second Tests, making 32, 33 and 10, but was injured and England lost the Third Test and with it the series 1–0. Cowdrey returned for the Fifth Test to make 20 and 93 not out, finishing with 188 runs (47.00). More importantly he took the catches for Fred Trueman's 299th and 300th Test wickets. In the County Championship Cowdrey's captaincy and his long-term plans with Les Ames were starting to pay off as Kent moved up to 7th place.

Dexter declared himself unavailable for the 1964–65 tour of South Africa as he contested the Cardiff South East seat in the 1964 General Election. Cowdrey did not tour, though he did go to the West Indies with the International Cavaliers, and Mike Smith was made captain, though Dexter joined him as vice-captain after losing to Jim Callaghan. After his 1–0 victory in South Africa Smith was retained as captain and as Dexter broke his leg while parking his car Cowdrey was made vice-captain again. He made 85 in the First Test against New Zealand, 119 in the Second and 13 in the Third as England easily won the series 3–0. South Africa were a tougher prospect with Graeme Pollock making 125 in the Second Test at Trent Bridge and his brother Peter Pollock taking 10/87, Cowdrey came in at 63/3 and made 105 of the 142 runs added while he was at the crease, but it was the only time England lost a Test in which he made a century. He made 58 and 78 not out in the Third Test and 327 runs (65.40), but South Africa won 1–0, their last Test series against England for 29 years. Cowdrey took Kent up to 5th place in the County Championship, compared with 7th in the previous season.

Though Cowdrey still had his supporters at Lords Smith was kept as captain for the 1965–66 Ashes series with Cowdrey as vice-captain, but they knew each other as schoolboys and Oxford undergraduates and got on well. Cowdrey was ill for most of December and missed the First Test. He made 104 in the Second Test at Melbourne, where England made 558, their biggest total down under since 636 in the Second Test in 1928–29. He did little on the tour except to make 63 and 108 against the weak Tasmanian attack and the series was drawn 1–1 with the batsmen on both teams scoring heavily. Cowdrey himself made 267 runs (53.40), his best batting average in an Ashes series. Carrying on to New Zealand Cowdrey made a duck in the First Test, but recovered with 89 not out in the Second and 58 in the Third which made him the fifth player after Wally Hammond, Don Bradman, Len Hutton and Neil Harvey to make 6,000 Test runs, but the rain affected series was drawn 0–0.

Mike Smith was kept as captain for only the First Test of the 1966 series against a West Indian team held together by the superb all round skills of their captain Gary Sobers. Sobers won the toss at Old Trafford, batted first and caught England on a spinning wicket for an innings victory, Cowdrey making 69 in the debacle. Smith was dismissed as captain and dropped from the team due to his well-known weakness to the West Indian fast bowlers. Cowdrey was placed in charge, which he accepted reluctantly due to the shoddy treatment of his friend and predecessor. In the Second Test at Lords England were 86 runs ahead in the first innings with the West Indies 95/5 when Sobers and his cousin David Holford added 274 to save the game. Cowdrey was criticised for not surrounding Sobers with fielders at the beginning of his innings, but he maintained that by spreading the field he encouraged him to make the strokes which could have got him out, but there was little doubt that the plan failed.

In the Third Test at Trent Bridge Cowdrey came in at 13/3 and made 96, adding 169 with Tom Graveney (109) to give England a 90 run lead, but Basil Butcher made 209 not out in the West Indian second innings and they won by 139 runs. The Fourth Test at Headingley saw the tourists rattle up 500, enforce the follow on and win by an innings and 55 runs. Like Smith Cowdrey was removed from the captaincy and dropped from the team, to be replaced by the hard-headed Yorkshire captain Brian Close. In an amazing Fifth Test at the Oval the West Indies made 268 and had England 166/7, but the last three wickets added 363 runs and England won by an innings. In the County Championship Cowdrey's Kent moved up for the third year in a row to 4th place.

There was no tour in 1966–67 and Cowdrey was not picked for the first four Tests of the summer, instead concentrating on Kent's chances in the County Championship. He was recalled for the Second Test against Pakistan, opening the innings, and made 14 and 2 not out in the 10 wicket victory. The Third Test at the Oval was won as well, but Close had been found guilty of time-wasting in a county match and accosting a spectator who complained of gamesmanship. He was fired as soon as the Test was won and the selectors announced that Cowdrey was to lead the MCC tour of the West Indies, although he disliked the politics and press attention. On a happier note Kent came second in the County Championship to Yorkshire and won their first one-day competition, the Gillette Cup final against Somerset in front of 20,000 fans at Lord's. Cowdrey won the toss and batted first, Kent making 193 with man of the match Mike Denness scoring 50 and Brian Luckhurst 54. Somerset were bowled out for 161 with Derek Underwood taking 3/41 for a 32 run victory.

=== 1967–68 to 1971 ===
The tour got off to a bad start when they were outscored in the warm up match against the Barbados Colts, but Cowdrey made 139 against the West Indies Board President's XI, adding 249 with Geoff Boycott (135). They batted poorly against Trinidad and Tobago and Colin Milburn made 139 against the Trinidad Colts, but the fast bowler John Snow was ill and went into the First Test at the Port of Spain as underdogs. It was Cowdrey's 92nd Test, taking him past Godfrey Evans's record of 91 Test caps. He won the toss and made 72 batting at number three, followed by Ken Barrington (143) and vice-captain Tom Graveney (118) to be all out for 568. The West Indies were made to follow on after making 363, but drew the match with 243/8 in the second innings.

Cowdrey made 107 when the MCC beat Jamaica by 174 runs and they went into the Second Test at Kingston with more confidence. He won the toss again and made 101 in England's 376 and forced the West Indies to follow on again when Snow's 7/49 dismissed them for 143. The West Indies were 204/5 on the day four and when Basil Butcher was caught behind off Basil D'Oliveira the crowd rioted and threw bottles onto the outfield. Cowdrey tried to calm the crowd without success and play was abandoned as the police used tear gas to restore order. Cowdrey and the manager Les Ames reluctantly agreed to resume play to help placate the crowd and an extra 75 minutes was added on the sixth day to make up for lost time. Sobers thought it wouldn't be needed as they had battled so badly, but the riot had unsettled the England team. The West Indian captain made 113 not out and was able to declare at 391/9, leaving England 190 to win on the extra day. Boycott and Cowdrey made ducks and English crashed to 43/4 at the end of day five and barely survived with 68/8 after the extra time on day six. Sobers took 3/33 and Lance Gibbs 3/11, which would have grave repercussions in the Fourth Test.

Cowdrey took the next two matches off (which were drawn), but was with Fred Titmus when the off-spinner had four toes cut off by a boat propeller while swimming and drove him to the hospital for surgery, which enabled him to return to cricket after the tour. The Third Test at Bridgetown was a dull draw, with Sobers winning the toss and the West Indies making 349, followed by 449 from England with Boycott (146) and John Edrich (90) adding 172 for the 1st wicket. They returned to Port of Spain for the Fourth Test, Sobers won the toss again and his team made 526/7. England replied with 404, Cowdrey top-scoring with 148 and hitting 21 boundaries. The game looked doomed to another draw when Sobers suddenly declared at 92/2 on the fifth day, leaving England 215 runs to win in 165 minutes. Sobers disliked the thought of playing out five draws in a series and remembered the sudden English collapse in the Third Test which might give him a surprise victory. Though he needed Tom Graveney and Ken Barrington to overcome his natural inclination to safety they set about the runs with Boycott holding up one end with 80 not out and adding 118 in 75 minutes with Cowdrey (71) for a 7 wicket victory with three minutes to spare. Sobers was lambasted throughout the West Indies for his declaration and Cowdrey found him drinking alone in a bar that evening when he was usually surrounded by fans.

The MCC beat Guyana and England went into the Fifth Test at Bourda with a 1–0 lead. Sobers won the toss again and revived his reputation with an innings of 150, adding 250 with Rohan Kanhai (152) as the West Indies made 414. England made 371 with Boycott (116) and Cowdrey (59) adding 172, then England collapsed to 269/8 before Tony Lock (brought over from Western Australia to replace Titmus) struck 89. Sobers made 95 not out in the West Indies second innings of 264, and England needed 308 to win on the last day. They fell to 41/5, but the four-hour Kent partnership of 127 between Cowdrey (82) and Alan Knott (73 not out) saved the day and England drew the match with a nail-biting 206/9. The win assumed greater proportions over the following years as it would be 32 years before England won another series against the West Indies. Cowdrey finished with 534 runs (66.75), his most prolific Test series and the only one in which he exceeded 500 runs.

Australia had held the Ashes since 1958–59 and Cowdrey was keen to return them to England, but he was frustrated by the damp summer. There was no excuse for the First Test at Old Trafford where Australia made 357 and England fell from 86/0 to 165 all out to the part-time off-spin of Bob Cowper (4/48) and lost by 159 runs, though Basil D'Oliveira made 87 not out in the second innings. The Second Test was the 200th between the two countries and Colin Milburn hammered 83 and Cowdrey 45 in England's 351/7 while Australia were hustled out for 78 after a freak hail storm whitened the ground. 15 hours were lost to the weather and after following on Australia salvaged a draw with 127/4.

The Third Test at Edgbaston was Cowdrey's 100th, the first time that anyone had completed a century of Tests. He celebrated by making 104, using Boycott as a runner after straining his leg. He became the second batsman after Wally Hammond to make 7,000 Test runs, but England took 172.5 overs to make 409 and though Australia only made 222 the match was drawn. Both Cowdrey and the Australian captain Bill Lawry were unfit for the Fourth Test, which was drawn when England finished on 230/4 needing 326. Australia's 1–0 lead ensured that they held onto the Ashes, but Cowdrey went to the Fifth Test determined to at least even the series. As the ball was swinging at the Oval that season he wanted the bowlers Tom Cartwright and Barry Knight, but they were both unfit and the opener Roger Prideaux caught a virus of the eve of the Test. D'Oliveira was an all-rounder who could swing the ball so Cowdrey asked for him to cover both needs and he made a politically important 158 in England's 494. Australia made 325 and dismissed England for 181, but collapsed to 85/5 at lunch on the last day needing 352 to win when a deluge flooded the Oval. The players started packing their bags, but Cowdrey called on the crowd to help the groundstaff dry the ground. "Like a modern-day King Canute he rolled up his trousers, waded into the water...and supervised the mopping up operations of hundreds of volunteers", Derek Underwood took 7/50 and England won by 226 runs with six minutes to spare. Kent came second to Yorkshire again in the County Championship, winning more matches, but falling behind on bonus points.

Basil D'Oliveira was a Cape Coloured who emigrated to England so he could play first-class cricket, from which he was banned in South Africa. When he was not included in the MCC team for South Africa after his match-winning century there was a press storm in what was known as the D'Oliveira affair. It appeared that he was omitted as he was unacceptable to the South African government, then at the height of apartheid. Cowdrey and the selectors maintained that he had not been chosen for purely cricketing reasons, but when Cartwright was declared unfit they brought in D'Oliveira, who was the first reserve. To President Vorster of South Africa it looked like the MCC was caving in to anti-apartheid pressure and he cancelled the tour. Cowdrey offered to fly to South Africa to mediate, but it was 26 years before England next played South Africa.

With the South African tour cancelled a new one was arranged to Ceylon and Pakistan, which was in political turmoil that resulted in the fall of President Ayub Khan and imposition of martial law by his successor General Yahya Khan. After a few easy-going matches in Ceylon the tour match against the West Pakistan Governor's XI saw play abandoned after 25 overs, there were no other tour matches and all the Tests were affected by political demonstrations against the military regime. In the First Test at Lahore Cowdrey won the toss and made exactly 100, his 22nd Test century to match Wally Hammond's England record. England made 309, dismissed Pakistan for 209 and Cowdrey declared the second innings at 225/9 to give them 326 to win, but Pakistan made 203/5 for a draw. Saeed Ahmed won the toss in the Second Test at Dacca in East Pakistan, soon to be Bangladesh, where there was rioting and gunfire around the team hotel. Pakistan made 246, which was matched by England's 274, thanks to D'Oliveira's 114 not out. Pakistan took 101 overs to make 196/5 and a token declaration left England to make 33/0. Cowdrey won the toss again in the Third Test at Karachi, but there were riots on the first two days by fans who wanted Hanif Mohammad as captain instead of Saeed. England piled up 502/7, with Colin Milburn making 139 and Tom Graveney 105, but the match was abandoned after demonstrators wrecked the stadium on the morning of the third day, leaving Alan Knott stranded on 96 not out. Cowdrey was not there to see it as he left on the second day after his father-in-law died, leaving Graveney in charge. The team followed on the third day, with manager Les Ames abandoning the Test and the rest of the tour to save the team.

Cowdrey broke the Achilles tendon in his left heel three weeks into the 1969 season and he could not play until the last match in September. The veteran Yorkshire professional Ray Illingworth was his surprise replacement after only a month as captain of Leicestershire. He was chosen over his rivals Brian Close and Tom Graveney as he was not seen as a threat to Cowdrey's long-term captaincy due to his age and inability to establish a regular spot in the Test team. However, Illingworth made his maiden Test century in his second Test in charge, beat the West Indies and New Zealand 2–0 each and remained captain even when Cowdrey recovered. Kent suffered from his absence and fell to 10th in the County Championship, but Cowdrey was able to get some match practice in by touring the West Indies with the International Cavaliers and the Duke of Norfolk's XI.

The South African tour was cancelled and as the cricketers needed practice against a top team before going to Australia, and to fill MCC coffers, a Rest of the World XI under Gary Sobers was organised from overseas cricketers playing for English counties. Cowdrey was still easing himself back into cricket when the First 'Test' was played and he was not selected, but played in the other four and made 1 and 64 in the Second, 0 and 71 in the Third, 1 and 0 in the Fourth and 73 and 31 in the Fifth, a total of 241 runs (30.13). England lost the series 4–1, but three of their defeats were close and they were playing the best team in the world. These were counted as Tests at the time, but the ICC subsequently disallowed them. This meant that Cowdrey passed Wally Hammond's record of 7,249 Test runs when he made 71 at Trent Bridge to become the most prolific Test batsmen, and would do it again in Australia.

Cowdrey's return to the England team fueled speculation that he was to resume the captaincy from Illingworth, but he did not and in the Third 'Test' he was told that his rival would be made captain for the Australian tour. He was willing to accompany him as a player, but had to think about being vice-captain again as he thought a younger man should be chosen. In the end he accepted in order to help his Kent teammate David Clark with the administration.

Cowdrey had other considerations in the summer of 1970, which was Kent County Cricket Club's Centenary. Kent had been 13th in the County Championship in his first year as captain in 1957, but had improved and were runners up in 1967 and 1968. The county has been short of funds throughout the 60s, but agreed to increase resources for extra staff for the 1970 season, which could only be justified by winning the County Championship for the first time since 1913. Apart from their energetic overseas player Asif Iqbal and the Scottish Mike Denness they had home-grown talent in the shape of Alan Knott, Derek Underwood, Bob Woolmer, Brian Luckhurst, and Alan Ealham. At the start of the season Edward Heath, Kent fan and leader of the Conservative Party, gave a speech at their dinner, saying that 1906 had seen Kent win their first County Championship alongside a change of government and they should do so again in 1970.

In early July it appeared that he had jinxed both their chances with Heath behind in the polls in the General Election and Kent at the bottom of the championship table. The change came when Sussex defeated them in the Gillette Cup, giving them two rest days which Cowdrey used to hammer out their difficulties in a team meeting. They decided to chase bonus points and won 7 and drew 5 of their last 12 games, often by close margins and it was a draw at the Oval, where Cowdrey made 112, that gave them the title with the newly elected Prime Minister Heath at the ground to invite them to a reception at 10 Downing Street to celebrate.

Cowdrey was made vice-captain for an Australian tour for the fourth time and Illingworth's tough no-nonsense approach to the game clashed with the MCC tour manager David Clark, who had been captain of Kent in Cowdrey's youth and had given him his county cap. As a result, Illingworth effectively took over the running of the tour with the support of the players and Clark's influence declined, as did that of Cowdrey, who as his only ally he became isolated, though he still had his Kent teammates Derek Underwood, Alan Knott and Brian Luckhurst. The players tended to avoid the press and public, even to the point of having their meals in their hotel rooms, and only Cowdrey made an effort to meet and greet the cricket fans. The rotund Cowdrey was in the sunset of his career and failed on tour, making only one century – 101 against Victoria – which was so slow that he was likened to a beached whale.

In the First Test he overtook Wally Hammond's record of 7,249 runs to become the most prolific Test batsman, a record he held for a year when it was overtaken by Gary Sobers. Cowdrey made only 1 run in the inaugural One Day International at Melbourne and was dropped for the Fourth Test, had his cap stolen while fielding in the Fifth Test and was dropped again for the Sixth and Seventh Tests. Illingworth won an argumentative series 2–0 and regained the Ashes, but Cowdrey only made 82 runs (20.50) in the series. They carried on to New Zealand, and Cowdrey missed the First Test and needed a runner to make 54 and 45 in the Second Test at Auckland, coming in at 63/4 in the second innings when New Zealand had a real chance of winning their first victory against England, but he added 76 with Alan Knott (96), and the danger was averted.

Cowdrey played what he thought was would be his last Test against Pakistan at Edgbaston, making 14 and 34. He was now 38 and a serious bout of pneumonia meant he could not play for half the season, though his 15th year as Kent captain he equalled Lord Harris's record and made him the longest serving post-war captain in county cricket. His vice-captain and successor Mike Denness led Kent for most of the season; they fell to 4th in the County Championship and were the finalists in the Gillette Cup, but Cowdrey was unable to play and they lost to Lancashire by 24 runs.

=== 1972 to 1976 ===
Cowdrey continued to play for Kent under Mike Denness (who succeeded Ray Illingworth as England captain in 1973) and the county continued its success. It came second in the County Championship in 1972 and fourth in 1973, but slipped to 10th in 1974. However, Kent did win the John Player League in 1972 and 1973, the Benson and Hedges Cup in 1973 (Cowdrey hitting 25 not out) and the Gillette Cup again in 1974, beating Lancashire by four wickets in the final. With his Test career seemingly over he was appointed a CBE by the Prime Minister Ted Heath in 1972. Cowdrey's great milestone was his 100th first-class century, 100 not out against Surrey at Maidstone on 5 July 1973, after which he had a celebratory luncheon at Lords with ex-prime minister Sir Alec Douglas-Home as the guest speaker.

After the disastrous First Test in Brisbane the tour selectors sent back to London for the 41-year-old Cowdrey as a replacement batsmen. Cowdrey was highly regarded by the MCC team and in particular by Mike Denness, who had succeeded him as captain of Kent. In his 20-year Test career he had faced the Australian fast bowlers Keith Miller, Ray Lindwall, Alan Davidson, Ian Meckiff, Gordon Rorke and even the young Dennis Lillee. Although the Australian press was aghast at such a recall – Cowdrey had not played a Test in four years – the tourists were keen to have a man with the technique and strength of purpose to play the fastest of bowlers. He arrived in Perth with the wives of the MCC team after a 19-hour delay in Bombay, too late to play a practice match, and was called up for the Second Test two days after he arrived and with three hours in the nets. This was his sixth tour of Australia, matching the record of the Lancashire spinner Johnny Briggs.

Cowdrey showed he had lost none of his timing and that his bat was as straight as ever until he was bowled behind his legs by Thomson (2/45) for 22. In the second innings he volunteered to open with David Lloyd instead of the badly bruised Brian Luckhurst. Cowdrey was dropped by Ian Redpath off Lillee, hit on the arm, survived a confident appeal by Rod Marsh before he was finally caught lbw by Thomson for 41, his highest score of the series. After the Second Test Cowdrey made 78 and took 2/27 against South Australia. Before the Third Test at Melbourne Frank Tyson recalled "Colin Cowdrey and John Edrich were unable to practice on Christmas Eve – mainly because of the drizzling rain but also because Cowdrey wanted to spend his birthday in comparative peace. Since both batsmen wanted to feel the ball on bat before the Test, I volunteered the use of the Hawthorn Indoor Cricket Centre, in which I was a partner, for a two-hour work-out on Christmas morning. It was quite a contrast to open the children's presents in the early hours and to open the bowling at the two English batsmen before lunch. My fifteen old son, Philip, thought the latter experience to be quite the best of his Christmas presents". He played his 114th and last Test at Melbourne, and opened the innings again as Lloyd was injured, but only made 7. Even so, England made 529 and won by an innings, with Cowdrey dismissing Rick McCosker for his 120th catch. He was given a warm farewell by his fans in "an impromptu little gathering on the outfield in front of the banner reading 'M.C.G. FANS THANK COLIN – 6 TOURS'. The central figure, wearing a large straw sun-hat, was signing endless autographs, posing for photographs and exchanging friendly talk with young and old in the way that has made him as popular a cricketer as has ever visited Australia".

The South African tour of 1975 was cancelled and instead there was Prudential World Cup with the Australians staying on for a Test series afterwards. Their first first-class match after losing the Cup Final was against Kent and Cowdrey has already announced his retirement at the end of the season. Ian Chappell won the toss and declared on 415/8, Kent were out for 202 and Chappell was able to declare his second innings at 140/3 on the last day to set the hosts 354 to win. He was so confident of a win that he ordered a coach for 4 pm to take the team to Southampton for dinner before their next match against Hampshire, but Cowdrey struck 151 not out, Kent won by 4 wickets and the Australians didn't reach Southampton until midnight. It was first victory by Kent over Australia since 1899. Cowdrey was asked to captain the MCC against the Australians, but was dismissed for a pair by Lillee, though this did not stop speculation that he would replace Mike Denness as England captain. His 107th and last first-class century was 119 not out against Gloucestershire, but he returned next year for one more game against Surrey when Kent were short of players, making 25 and 15 and taking two catches. Kent, incidentally, went on to win the John Player League in 1976 and the County Championship in 1977–78.

=== International centuries ===
Cowdrey made 22 Test centuries to equal Wally Hammond's England record. This has subsequently been exceeded by a number of players.

Of the 22 Tests in which Cowdrey made a hundred, England won 10, drew 11 and lost one; the defeat was the 1965 match against South Africa at Trent Bridge, in which Cowdrey scored 105. He was the first batsman to score a Test century against six different teams: Australia, South Africa, the West Indies, New Zealand, India and Pakistan – they were the only Test teams other than England during his career. The table below is a list of Cowdrey's Test centuries:

International centuries scored by Colin Cowdrey
No.	Date	Opposing team	Ground	Score
1	31 December 1954	Australia	MCG, Melbourne	102
2	1 January 1957	South Africa	Newlands, Cape Town	101
3	30 May 1957	West Indies	Edgbaston, Birmingham	154
4	20 June 1957	West Indies	Lord's, London	152
5	9 January 1959	Australia	SCG, Sydney	100*
6	2 July 1959	India	Headingley, Leeds	160
7	17 February 1960	West Indies	Sabina Park, Kingston	114
8	25 March 1960	West Indies	Queen's Park Oval, Port of Spain	119
9	18 August 1960	South Africa	The Oval, London	155
10	31 May 1962	Pakistan	Edgbaston, Birmingham	159
11	16 August 1962	Pakistan	The Oval, London	182
12	29 December 1962	Australia	MCG, Melbourne	113
13	1 March 1963	New Zealand	Basin Reserve, Wellington	128 not out
14	29 January 1964	India	Eden Gardens, Calcutta	107
15	8 February 1964	India	Feroz Shah Kotla Ground, New Delhi	151
16	17 June 1965	New Zealand	Lord's, London	119
17	5 August 1965	South Africa	Trent Bridge, Nottingham	105
18	30 December 1965	Australia	MCG, Melbourne	104
19	8 February 1968	West Indies	Sabina Park, Kingston	101
20	14 March 1968	West Indies	Queen's Park Oval, Port of Spain	148
21	11 July 1968	Australia	Edgbaston, Birmingham	104
22	21 February 1969	Pakistan	Gaddafi Stadium, Lahore	100

== Style and personality ==
As a batsman, Cowdrey's favourite stroke was the cover drive, at which he excelled, but he had the full array of stokes all around the wicket. His quick reflexes also made him an outstanding slip fielder. Tom Graveney described him as "a masterly batsman with an excellent technique (who) delighted crowds throughout the world with his style and elegance". However, Cowdrey always feared that his wicket was too important to be thrown away and he was sometimes too cautious when facing certain bowlers. John Arlott noticed this and commented: "Cowdrey could sink into pits of uncertainty when the fire ceased to burn, allowing himself to be dominated by bowlers inferior to him in skill". Cowdrey himself said: "The proudest thing in my career was that I kept surviving".

Cowdrey adopted a mostly cautious approach to captaincy but always listened to his players. He would usually set a field as recommended by the bowler and then stick to it, rather than making frequent changes. His greatest asset was man-management as he genuinely cared about his players. For example, he always thanked each bowler at the end of a spell and each batsman at the end of an innings. Tom Graveney said Cowdrey was the best captain he played under.

== Personal life and post-retirement ==
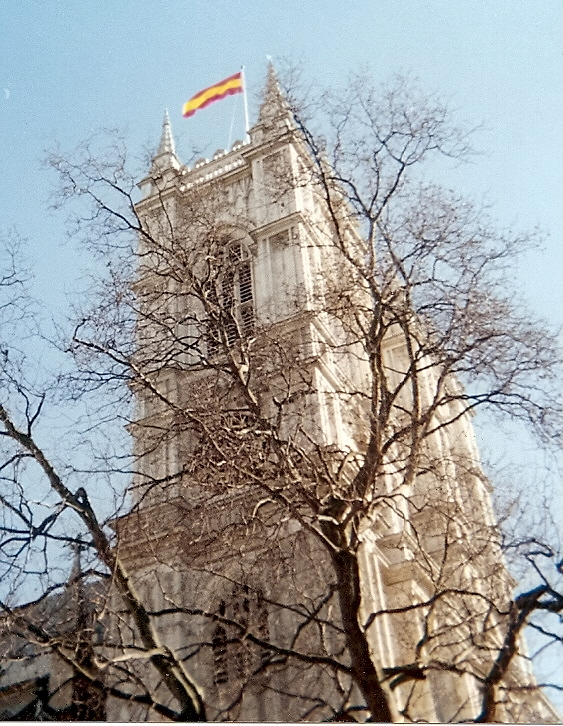
The MCC flag flying over Westminster Abbey on the day of Cowdrey's memorial service.

While still a player, Cowdrey was appointed Commander of the Order of the British Empire (CBE) in the 1972 New Year Honours for services to cricket. Following his retirement in 1976, he worked closely behind the scenes at Kent and became President of the MCC in 1986. He was Chairman of the International Cricket Council from 1989 to 1993, when referees and neutral umpires were introduced to international cricket. He served on the board at House of Whitbread Frelims and Barclays Bank International and was a member of the Council of the Winston Churchill Memorial Trust, a Member of the Council of The Cook Society (affiliate of Britain–Australia Society) Having been knighted in the 1992 New Year Honours, Cowdrey became a life peer as Baron Cowdrey of Tonbridge in the 1997 Queen's Birthday Honours List; he is one of only two cricketers to be given a life peerage for their services to the sport, the other being Learie Constantine in 1969. Cowdrey was named President of Kent County Cricket Club in 2000, the year he died.

He was married twice. His first wife was Penny Chiesman from 1956 until their divorce in 1985. They were the parents of Kent cricketers Chris and Graham Cowdrey. Cowdrey's second wife was Lady Anne Fitzalan-Howard, whom he married in 1985. Cowdrey died of a heart attack on 4 December 2000, aged 67. He is the fourth most recent sportsman to be honoured with a memorial service in Westminster Abbey, following Sir Frank Worrell, Lord Constantine and Bobby Moore. The Marylebone Cricket Club (MCC) Spirit of Cricket Cowdrey Lecture was inaugurated in his memory.

== Bibliography ==
- Arlott, John (1986). John Arlott's 100 Greatest Batsmen. London: Queen Anne Press. ISBN 978-03-56176-64-2.
- Cowdrey, Colin (1976). M.C.C. The Autobiography of a Cricketer. London: Hodder & Stoughton. ISBN 978-03-40147-40-5.
- Graveney, Tom (1983). The Heart of Cricket. London: Arthur Barker. ISBN 978-02-13168-60-5.
- Moyes, A. G.; Goodman, Thomas (1965). With the M.C.C. in Australia 1962–63, A Critical Story of the Tour. London: The Sportsmans Book Club. ASIN B00178493I.
- Playfair (1955). Ross, Gordon (ed.). Playfair Cricket Annual. London: Playfair Books.
- Playfair (1958). Ross, Gordon (ed.). Playfair Cricket Annual. London: Playfair Books.
- Tyson, Frank (2004). In the Eye of the Typhoon: The Inside Story of the MCC Tour of Australia and New Zealand 1954/55. London: Parrs Wood Press. ISBN 978-19-03158-57-9.
- Willis, Bob; Murphy, Patrick (1986). Starting With Grace. London: Stanley Paul. ISBN 978-00-91661-00-7.

Sporting positions
Preceded by Peter May; Peter May; Ted Dexter; M. J. K. Smith; Brian Close; Tom Graveney	English national cricket captain 1959; 1959/60–1961; 1962; 1966; 1967/68–1968; 1968–1968/69	Succeeded by Peter May; Peter May; Ted Dexter; Brian Close; Tom Graveney; Ray Illingworth
Preceded by Doug Wright	Kent County Cricket Club captain 1957–1971	Succeeded by Mike Denness
New post	President of the ICC; 1989–1993	Succeeded by Sir Clyde Walcott
