= Chris Cowdrey =

English cricketer

The Honourable Chris Cowdrey
Personal information
- Full name: Christopher Stuart Cowdrey
- Born: 20 October 1957 (age 69); Farnborough, Kent, England
- Nickname: Cow, Woody
- Height: 6 ft 0 in (1.83 m)
- Batting: Right-handed
- Bowling: Right arm medium
- Role: All-rounder, commentator

International information
- National side: England
- Test debut (cap 510): 28 November 1984 v India
- Last Test: 21 July 1988 v West Indies
- ODI debut (cap 78): 23 January 1985 v India
- Last ODI: 17 February 1985 v Australia

Domestic team information
- Years: Team
- 1976–1991: Kent
- 1992: Glamorgan

Career statistics
| Competition | Test | ODI | FC | LA |
|---|---|---|---|---|
| Matches | 6 | 3 | 299 | 333 |
| Runs scored | 101 | 51 | 12,252 | 6,846 |
| Batting average | 14.42 | 25.50 | 31.90 | 27.05 |
| 100s/50s | 0/0 | 0/0 | 21/58 | 2/42 |
| Top score | 38 | 46* | 159 | 122* |
| Balls bowled | 399 | 52 | 14,523 | 7,740 |
| Wickets | 4 | 2 | 200 | 204 |
| Bowling average | 77.25 | 27.50 | 39.81 | 29.30 |
| 5 wickets in innings | 0 | 0 | 2 | 1 |
| 10 wickets in match | 0 | 0 | 0 | 0 |
| Best bowling | 2/65 | 1/3 | 5/46 | 5/28 |
| Catches/stumpings | 5/– | 0/– | 295/– | 108/– |
- Source: Cricinfo, 30 March 2008

Christopher Stuart Cowdrey (born 20 October 1957) is an English former cricketer. Cowdrey played for Kent, Glamorgan and England as an all-rounder. He is the eldest son of the cricketer and life peer, Colin Cowdrey, Baron Cowdrey of Tonbridge. He was educated at Tonbridge School.

== Life and career ==
After a good season for Kent in County cricket in 1984, Cowdrey was selected for England's 1984–85 tour of India, led by his friend David Gower, ostensibly taking Ian Botham's place after Botham had opted out of the tour. In the First Test in Bombay he was fielding at short leg when Gower asked him to bowl. Although he forgot to take off his shin pads he bowled Kapil Dev with his fourth ball, the 19th England bowler to take a wicket in his first over. His father was listening to Test Match Special in his car and was so surprised that he drove the wrong way down a one-way street. Following the tour, where he had scored 96 runs and taken four wickets Cowdrey was not selected by England until 1988, and the infamous "summer of four captains". In that year Cowdrey, who had taken Kent to the top of the County Championship table, was given the job to lead the Test side in the fourth Test of a five match series against the West Indies. The West Indies by that point were 2–0 up, claiming a convincing innings and 156 run victory in the previous test. "We believe Cowdrey's style of leadership is what is now required", said England's chairman of selectors Peter May, who was also Cowdrey's godfather, amid charges of favouritism. England lost heavily by ten wickets, and his chance to prove his detractors wrong in the final Test never came, as he was injured after the one appearance. Kent would also be pipped to the 1988 County Championship by Worcestershire by one point. He was never chosen to captain or play for England again.

A newspaper article penned by Cowdrey landed him in trouble in the corridors at Lord's and, in 1990, he joined a rebel tour to South Africa.

Colin and Chris Cowdrey were only the second father and son combination to have both captained England, emulating Frank and George Mann. He was captain of Kent from 1986 until 1990. He retired in 1992 after a single season at Glamorgan, and has since been a broadcaster for Talksport, as well as the occasional project with Sky Sports.

In 1986, Cowdrey produced a volume of autobiography, appropriately titled Good Enough, taken from his usual response to comments that he was not as good as his father. Cricket writer Colin Bateman stated, "Cowdrey was fortunate to play Test cricket at all, but he did not deserve the shabby treatment which ended his brief England career".

Cowdrey's son Fabian Cowdrey was awarded a first-team contract at Kent in October 2011, before his May 2012 debut, becoming the fourth Cowdrey to play for the county side and the third generation of the same family to feature on a Kent team sheet.

== Honours ==
- He was awarded Honorary Life Membership of the Marylebone Cricket Club in 2011.

Sporting positions
| Preceded by Chris Tavaré | Kent County Cricket Club captain 1985–1990 | Succeeded by Mark Benson |
