= Whitgift School =

Independent school near Croydon, Greater London

Location
- Haling Park; South Croydon, Greater London, CR2 6YT; England; 51°21′36″N 0°06′05″W

Information
- Type: Public school Private boarding and day school for boys
- Motto: Latin: Vincit qui patitur ("He who perseveres, conquers")
- Religious affiliation: Church of England
- Established: 1596; 430 years ago
- Founder: John Whitgift, Archbishop of Canterbury
- Local authority: Croydon
- Department for Education URN: 101837 Tables
- Head Master: Toby Seth
- Staff: 200
- Gender: Boys
- Age: 10 to 18
- Enrolment: 1,478
- Houses: Andrew's; Brodie's; Cross'; Dodds; Ellis'; Mason's; Smith's; Tate's
- Colours: Gold and Navy
- Publication: Whitgift Life Magazine
- Alumni: Old Whitgiftians (OWs)
- Website: Official website

Whitgift School is an independent day school and boarding school in South Croydon, London, in the English public school tradition. Along with Trinity School of John Whitgift, it is owned by the Whitgift Foundation, a charitable trust. The school was previously a grammar school and direct grant grammar school, but the school's headmaster is now a member of the Headmasters' and Headmistresses' Conference.

== History ==
Whitgift School was founded in 1596 by the Archbishop of Canterbury John Whitgift and opened in 1600 as part of the Whitgift Foundation which had the aim of building a hospital and school in Croydon for the "poor, needy and impotent people" from the parishes of Croydon and Lambeth. Originally located in North End, Croydon, in 1931 it moved to its current site, Haling Park, which was once home to Lord Howard of Effingham, the Lord High Admiral of the Fleet sent against the Spanish Armada.

Originally a day school, boarding was introduced in 1992, and a boarding house was opened for the 2013–14 school year. Between 1881 and 1931 the school was known as Whitgift Grammar School, however after the move to Haling Park, it returned to its previous name of 'Whitgift School'. In 1946, it relinquished its direct grant and became a fully independent school.

== Grounds and buildings ==
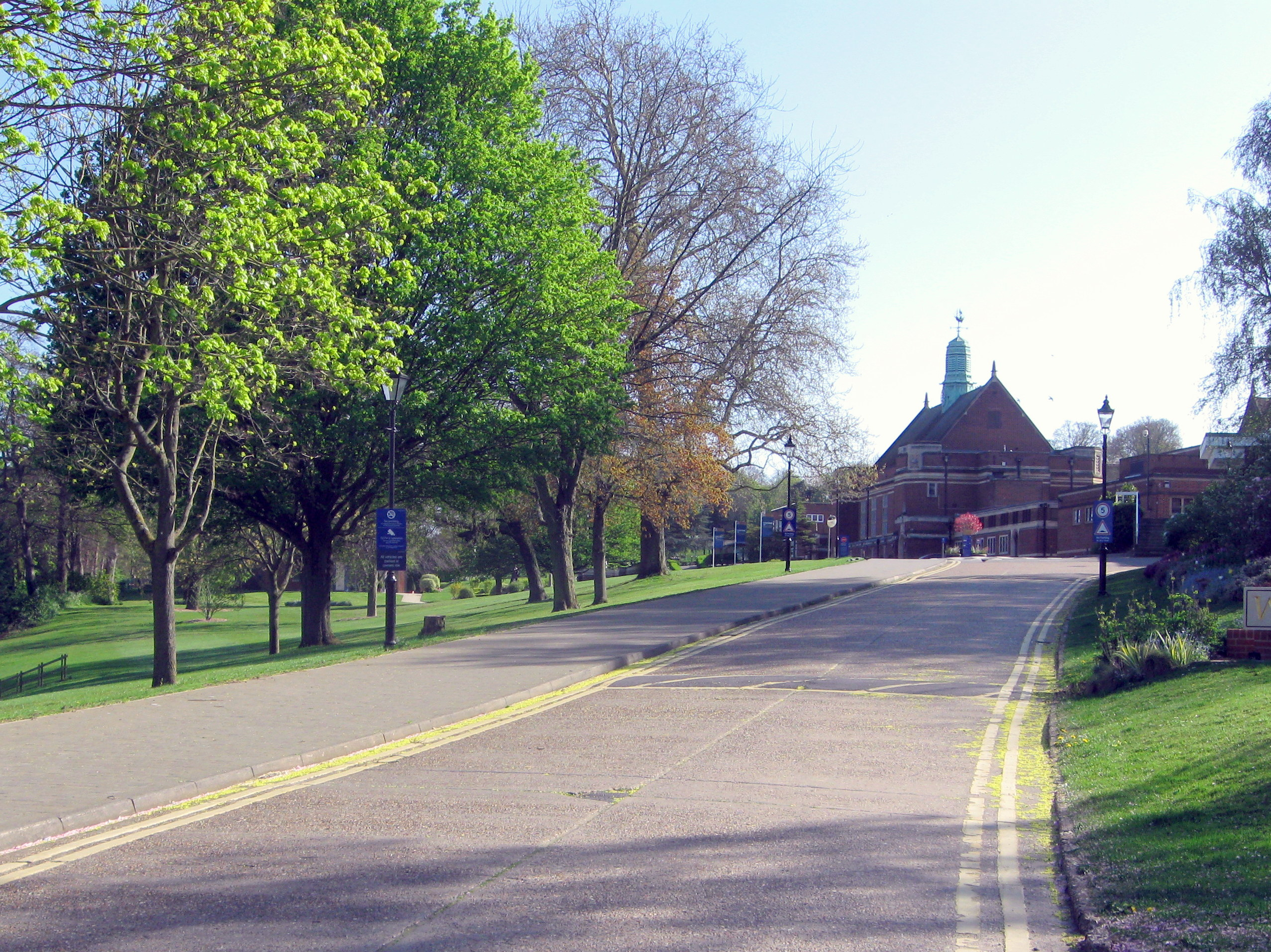
Whitgift School; view from main entrance, April 2020

Whitgift is located in a 45-acre (18 ha) parkland site. The ship (a model of Ark Royal, the flagship of Lord Howard of Effingham against the Spanish Armada) that features prominently on the top of the school hall is a reminder of the history of the site. Additions since the 400th anniversary of the school have been a maze in the founder's garden, an aviary, an enclosure for Prevost's squirrels, ponds and a sports complex.

The original buildings have been supplemented by many additions and improvements including a Music School and Concert Hall, an integrated facility for science, technology, art and design together with library and resource centres, a separate Lower School building, and a major new Sports and Conference Centre which was opened in February 2005. A new Art Department, Performing Arts Centre and a new Sixth Form Centre were completed in the middle of 2011. Whitgift was named Independent School Grounds Team of the Year at the Grounds Management Association (GMA) Industry Awards 2026.

Whitgift has a wide variety of animals, including peacocks on the grounds since the 1930s, and flamingos. In 2005 Sir David Attenborough visited the school to open the ponds, the enclosure of which also houses various waterfowl, including Hawaiian geese.

== Education ==
Since 2005, Whitgift has offered the International Baccalaureate Diploma Programme to the Sixth Form as an optional alternative to A-Levels.

== Co-curricular activities ==
Whitgift School offers co-curricular activities within the school. This is reflected in the sporting facilities as well as an array of musical activities.

=== Combined Cadet Force ===
Whitgift has a combined cadet force. The school has partnerships with two local state schools St. Andrews C of E High School and Thomas More School, allowing their students to take part in CCF activities.

=== Sport ===
The school fields teams in a range of sports and has a sports and conference centre which hosts competitions, the Health & Fitness Centre (a 55 station gym and group exercise studio are open to students and their families). It also has a 25-metre swimming pool, sports hall, squash courts, sports pitches (including an all-weather pitch) a golf driving range, and three tennis courts. Whitgift School has won over 300 national titles across several sports.

In rugby it has won the National Schools Competitions three times and the U15 Cup twice in the past ten years. The school has strong links with local academies including Harlequins, London Irish, Saracens and Wasps, and it plays against other rugby leaders – Sedbergh School, Wellington College, Harrow School, Millfield and Dulwich College.

Whitgift is the first school to win the England Hockey U18 Boys National Final four times in a row (2023, 2024, 2025, 2026). Whitgift's 1st XI are also the only team to have won the "treble" (the Indoor and Outdoor National Titles and the ISHC Independent Schools Title in the same season) which they have won twice in 2024 and 2025.

Whitgift won the National Indoor Hockey Championships at Under 15 and Under 18 levels in 2011. The school also become national Under 18 golf champions for the first time in 2014 at Carnoustie. The first recorded cricket match held on the school ground occurred in 1898 when the school played University College School. From 2003 to 2011 the school ground hosted 12 List-A matches for county club Surrey. The Women's GB Handball team has trained on occasions at the School as has the England Korfball steam.

Whitgift School was the No. 1 Boy's School for Sport 2025 (placing No.2 Overall behind Millfield) in the School Sport Magazine Rankings.

== Headmasters ==
- 1600–1601 Ambrose Brygges
- 1601–1606 John Ireland
- 1606–1616 Robert Davies
- 1616–1629 William Nicolson
- 1629–1648 John Webb
- 1648–1651 Noris Wood
- 1651–1662 Thomas Day
- 1662–1668 John Philips
- 1668–1675 William Crowe
- 1675–1681 John Shepheard
- 1681–1712 John Caesar
- 1712–1742 Henry Mills
- 1742–1751 Samuel Staveley
- 1751–1774 John Taylor Lamb
- 1774–1801 James Hodgson
- 1801–1812 John Rose
- 1812–1843 John Collinson Bisset
- 1843–1865 George Coles
- 1865–1871 William Ingrams
- 1871–1902 Robert Brodie
- 1903–1927 Samuel Ogden Andrew
- 1928–1939 Stanley Gurner
- 1939–1946 Gerald Ellis
- 1946–1961 Edward Marlar
- 1961–1970 Michael Hugill
- 1970–1991 David Raeburn
- 1991–2017 Christopher Barnett
- 2017–2024 Christopher Ramsey

== Notable alumni ==
Former pupils of Whitgift are known as "Old Whitgiftians".

== Notable staff ==
- Anthony Seldon, Head of Politics at Whitgift in the 1980s, head of Brighton, Wellington and Epsom Colleges, biographer of contemporary British political figures.
- David Ward, cricket coach who, having retired from playing for Surrey, produced a stream of cricketers for the England team.
- Sir Dick White, Assistant Master in the 1930s, former Director General of MI5 and Head of MI6.

== Southern Railway Schools Class ==
The Southern Railway V Class was known as the Schools Class because all 40 locomotives were named after public schools. "Whitgift", SR no. 916 and BR no. 30916, was built in 1934 and withdrawn in 1962. The Whitgift nameplate that was formerly mounted on the front driving wheel-splasher of the locomotive is now on display in the Raeburn Library in the school. Hornby Models created an OO gauge replica of the 916 Whitgift Schools Class locomotive. Whitgift has one on display in the Raeburn Library underneath the Whitgift nameplate from the 4–4–0 train.
