= Maria Hare =

English diarist and memorist (1798–1870)

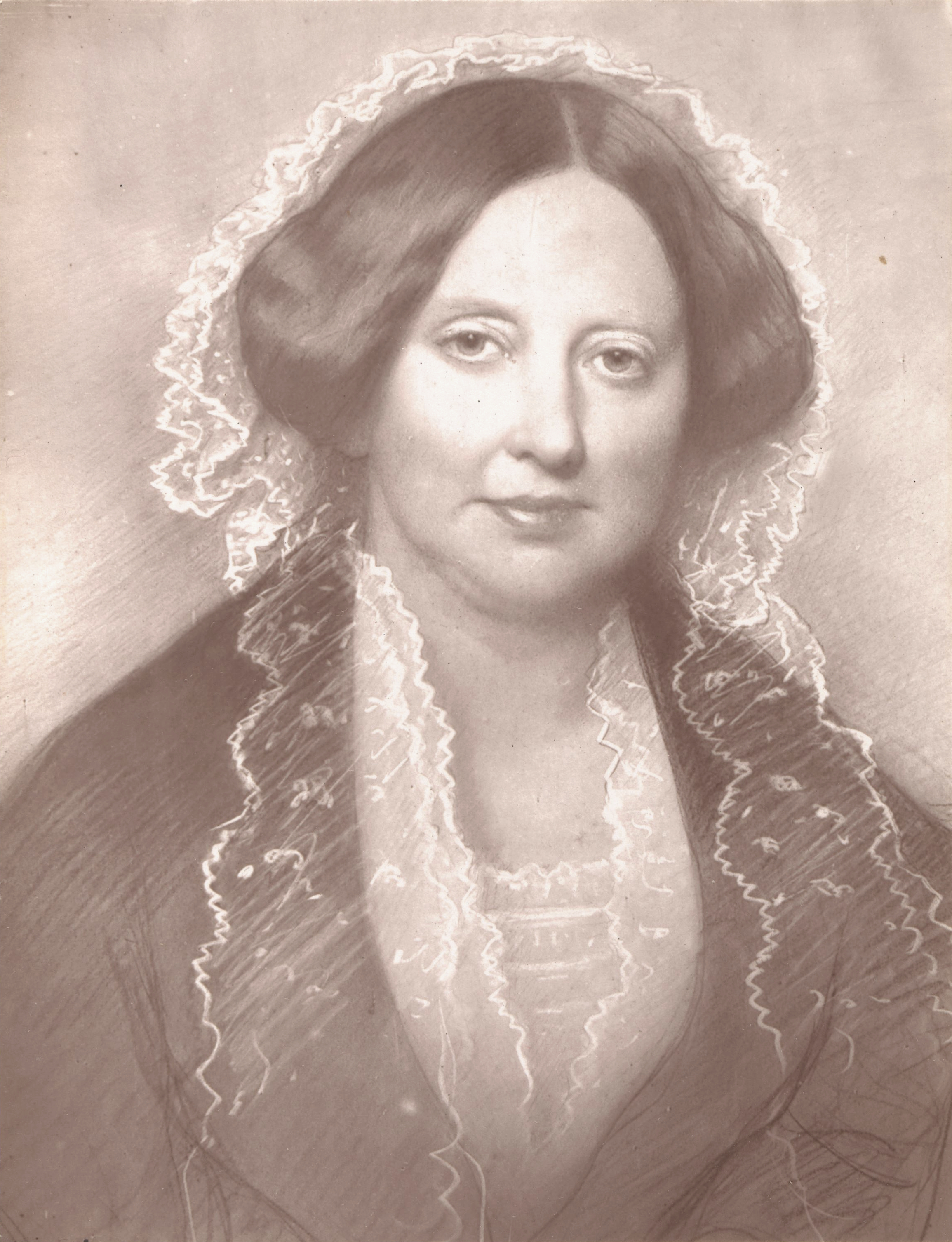
Maria Hare, after Giovanni Battista Canevari

Maria Hare (22 November 1798 – 13 November 1870), birth name Maria Leycester, was an English diarist and memoirist. She was an assiduous correspondent, and collected family letters.

Maria Hare is known as the widow of Augustus William Hare, and as the central figure of Memorials of a Quiet Life, the biographical work published in the years after her death by her adopted son Augustus Hare. She was recognised posthumously both as a participant in a close-knit group of evangelical Christians largely drawn from the Hare, Maurice and Stanley families, and as an exemplar of Christian faith. In her lifetime she published only a pamphlet to raise charitable support at the time of Lancashire Cotton Famine.

== Early life and background ==
She was the daughter of the Rev. Oswald Leycester (bapt. 1752 – 1846) and his first wife Mary Johnson; her father was rector of Stoke on Tern in Shropshire from 1806, and brother of George Leycester. Her father's sister Martha Elizabeth married in 1793 the barrister John Adolphus. The Leycesters were "an ancient family, settled at Toft, in Cheshire." Early in his clerical career, Oswald Leycester had been curate at Alderley.

Maria's sister Catherine married in 1810 the future bishop Edward Stanley; Edward Penrhyn, who changed his surname in 1817, was her brother.

In 1809 Maria Leycester was sent to a small boarding school at Leighton Cottage, near Parkgate, Cheshire, where children of the Stanleys of Alderley were among the pupils. She returned home in 1810, after her sister's marriage. There she was taught French and Italian by her father, continuing also to take tuition from her sister by correspondence.

In 1812 Maria's mother died. Her father married again, in 1814, to Eliza White, daughter of the late Charles White of Sale, Cheshire and Manchester. In 1820 Charles Leycester, Maria's brother, died: he had graduated B.A. at Brasenose College, Oxford in 1817.

== Martin Stow ==
The Leycester family were on good terms with Reginald Heber, who became rector of nearby Hodnet in 1807. Maria Leycester met there the Rev. Martin Stow, acting as curate to Heber, and became engaged to him. Stow, a Fellow of New College, Oxford from 1812, had a position as Protestant chaplain at Genoa, apparently with some financial support from the college, from 1821, appointed by William Howley. There he encountered Mary Shelley in 1822, after the death by drowning of her husband Percy Bysshe Shelley.

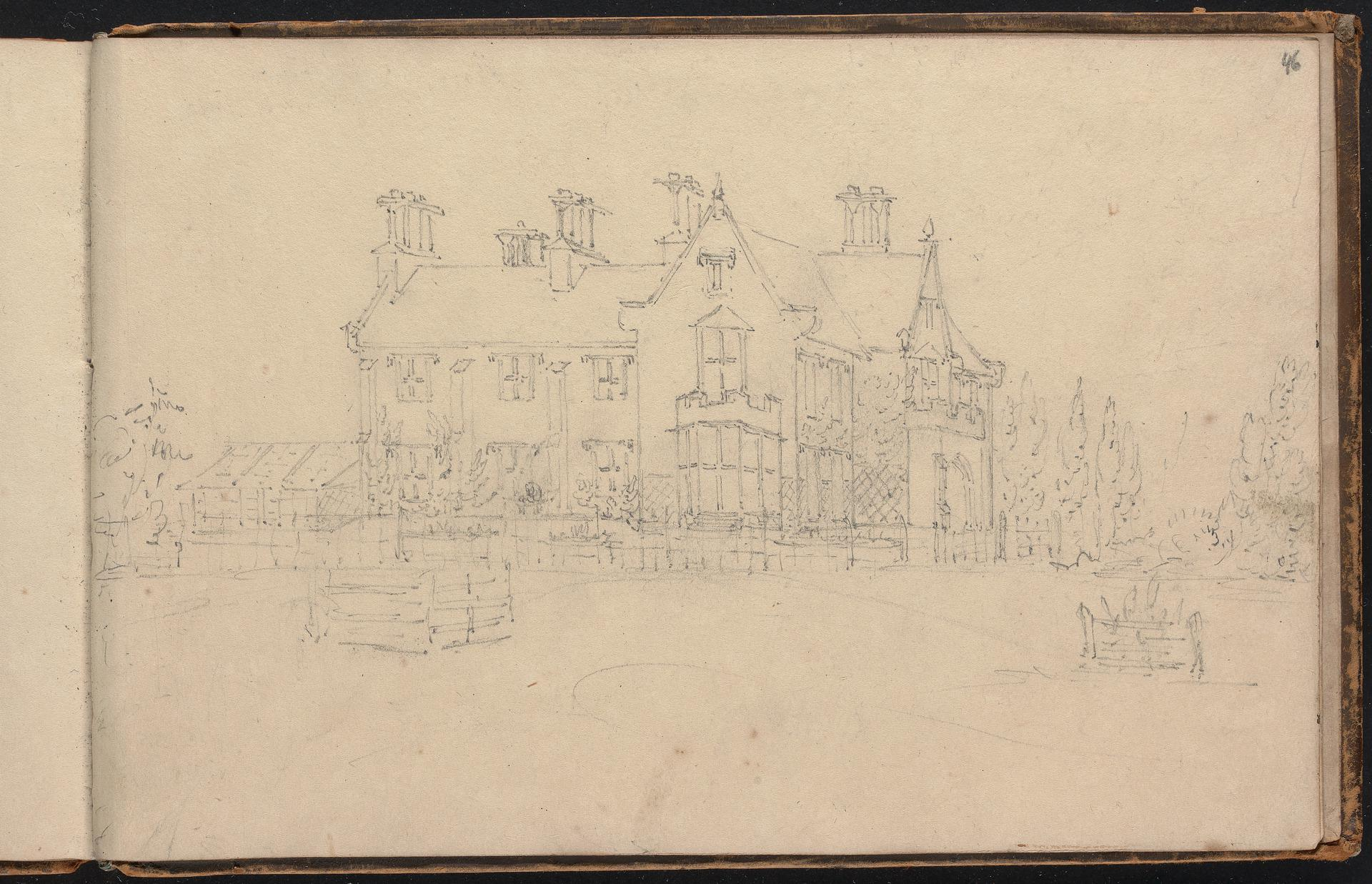
Hodnet Rectory, 29 March 1823, drawing by Maria Leycester

Augustus William Hare, a clerical friend of Stow, was a first cousin of Heber's wife Amelia, daughter of William Davies Shipley. The engagement of Stow and Maria Leycester was not approved by her father: in fact Stow on marriage would give up his fellowship. Heber was appointed Bishop of Calcutta in 1823, and Stow accepted a position as chaplain with him. On a last visit to Stoke on Tern, Hare accompanied Stow. Stow died of infectious disease in Dacca (Dhaka) in 1825.

== Clergyman's wife 1829–1834 ==
Maria Leycester and the Rev. Augustus William Hare, Stow's friend from New College and a Fellow there from 1810, were drawn together after his death, and they were married in 1829. Charles Kegan Paul wrote that the match was "not without much strenuous opposition on the part of the Leycesters". Hare had become unpopular in the college by attacking the traditional relationship with Winchester College linked to founders' kin. In consequence, while Hare was offered a college living, Alton Barnes, its income was low.

Alton Barnes, where Hare became rector in 1829, was one of the smallest parishes in the country; Hare could, it seemed, aspire to Herstmonceux rectory, where the family had the advowson. That year Maria Hare opened a Sunday school. Her nephew Owen Stanley visited Alton in 1831.

Hare's great-uncle Robert Hare, rector of Herstmonceux, died in 1832. In the event, Hare refused the living, which was in gift of Francis George Hare, the eldest brother. His brother Julius Charles Hare then accepted the living, first making a journey to Italy, where Francis was mostly to be found.

Hare himself travelled to Italy for his health in the winter of 1833/4, with Maria, in a party that included his brother Marcus Theodore Hare RN, and his wife Lucy Ann née Stanley (married September 1833). He died at Rome in February 1834 and his widow Maria returned to England. Julius Hare took up the post of rector of Herstmonceux and moved into the rectory.

== Return to England and the adoption of nephew Augustus Hare ==
Maria Hare, back in England went, firstly, to Alton Barnes to settle her husband's affairs. The parish had been left in the hands of a curate, Robert Kilvert, the future father of the diarist Francis Kilvert. Maria and Robert corresponded, from 1834 to 1839, and had compatible religious views. Maria also became godmother to Kilvert's children. Robert Kilvert, unlike his son Francis, was a Recordite, and from 1835 was rector at Hardenhuish. He married in 1838.

She then went to the Herstmonceux rectory, at Julius's invitation, and from there arranged for the care of the infant nephew Augustus Hare, son of the expatriate brother Francis George Hare, to be transferred to her. This matter was handled by an English nurse, Mrs. Gayford, going to Mannheim. Two months after Augustus arrived with his nurse in Herstmonceux, Maria rented Lime House, near Herstmonceux rectory, as her family home.

== Hare circle c.1834–1860 ==
The London Quarterly wrote in 1898 that the essay "Notes of an English Ramble", by the American Methodist pastor Frank Mason North, was "a pleasant introduction to the Hares of Hurstmonceaux [sic] and their circle." The "Ramble" (1897) began at the rectories of Stoke Upon Tern, Hodnet and Alderley; it finished at Eversley with Charles Kingsley. North wrote "About the luminous path of this aunt-mother, Maria Hare, the memorials gather".

John Sterling, a student of Julius Hare at Cambridge, became a curate at Herstmonceux in 1834; while he stayed not much longer than a year, he became a close friend of Maria Hare, who had long conversations with him. He had been an associate a few years earlier of F. D. Maurice, on the Athenaeum, and through him the Hares encountered the Maurice family. Sterling had married in 1830 Susannah Barton; Maurice's first wife was her sister Anna Barton. Maurice visited Sterling at this period, and his sister Priscilla frequently came with him: Maria in that way met her. Priscilla later visited Maria each summer.

In the course of time, Maria Hare came under the influence of Priscilla Maurice in religious matters, and was a "strong evangelical". In 1844 Julius Hare married (Jane) Esther Maurice (1814–1864), another sister of F. D. Maurice.

== Educating Augustus ==
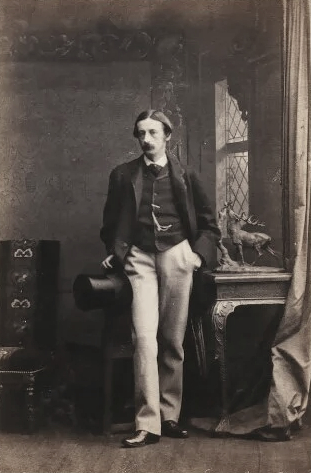
Augustus John Cuthbert Hare, 1862 photograph

Augustus Hare's autobiography The Story of My Life details unhappiness with his home life and schooling. Baigent in the Oxford Dictionary of National Biography states that this aspect of the work has "unwisely" been taken literally. He became in 1843 a boarding pupil of Robert Kilvert at the Rectory, Hardenhuish; there, from an only child's household, he encountered other boys. Kilvert was in the orbit of Pestalozzi's educational ideas, as they were being adopted by British evangelicals in the circle of Samuel Wilderspin, Charles and Elizabeth Mayo and John Stuckey Reynolds.

The Maurice sisters, Priscilla, Mary Atkinson Maurice, and Esther, were involved in running a school at Reading, Berkshire, for 15 years up to 1844 when Esther married Julius Hare. Esther at the Herstmonceaux rectory intervened in Maria's upbringing of Augustus as a severe disciplinarian. Maria taught Augustus to draw. This was in her fashion, with pencil, and with sepia ink used monochrome. When he was an adult he was allowed to paint in watercolour. Becoming a travel writer, Augustus Hare was noted for illustrated books using his own sketches.

Hare spent one year at Harrow School in 1846/7 but left for health reasons. In 1848, the third in a succession of private tutors was "the Rev. H.S.R.", Henry Sylvester Richmond, son of Legh Richmond the evangelical author, who at the time was chaplain to the workhouse in Bath; Hare boarded with him at Lyncombe. He then attended the Southgate school of the Rev. Charles Bradley (1815–1883), son of Charles Bradley.

In 1853, Hare matriculated at University College, Oxford, where he graduated B.A. in 1856, M.A. in 1859. After his graduation in 1856, Maria and Augustus took a continental tour of about 18 months, for the sake of her health. Much of the time was spent in Rome. During this period, Augustus made it clear that he did not want to be ordained in the Church of England, as Maria had wished.

== At Holmhurst ==
In 1860 Maria and Augustus Hare moved to Holmhurst St Mary, a house she bought and renamed, on a ridge north of Hastings. It was their home for the rest of her life.

== Works ==
- A True and Sad Story (1862)

== Reputation and religious model ==
The first volume of Memorials of a Quiet Life (3 vols.) by Augustus Hare appeared in 1872. At this point, the Athenæum could write "of her who forms the central figure of these "Memorials," and about whom they chiefly treat, no one outside the circle of her own family and immediate friends ever heard." With the 1874 selection Records of a Quiet Life for American publication, edited by William Leonard Gage, William Cullen Bryant could write to Orville Dewey in the terms "keeping all the commonplace piety of Maria Hare" and "Maria Hare's reflections, which I had read many times over, in different books."

A selection of Maria Hare's letters, from 1827 to 1867, was included in The Inner Life (1878), edited by Thomas Erskine of Linlathen.

The American minister Eden Burroughs Foster in 1883 classed Maria Hare with four other "dutiful" women: Mary Lyon, Harriet Newell, Henrietta Hamlin the wife of Cyrus Hamlin and Mary Somerville.

== Legacy ==
Maria Hare's collecting of correspondence and family history materials led to Augustus Hare's Memorials, and his later autobiographical volumes. She was, in her lifetime, prominent only in family and evangelical circles.

Barnes gives family background on Maria's extensive collecting down the years of correspondence. She had written or dictated something towards the project at the end of her life. Boase in Modern English Biography stated that Maria Hare had "written a portion of and collected material for" the Memorials. Esther Hare, who died in 1864, had burned many letters kept in Lime House, without authorisation, while Maria and Augustus were in Italy in 1857; the matter is referred to in the supplementary Volume III of Memorials, where Augustus Hare contested the version of the events claimed by Esther's executors.
