= Francis George Hare =

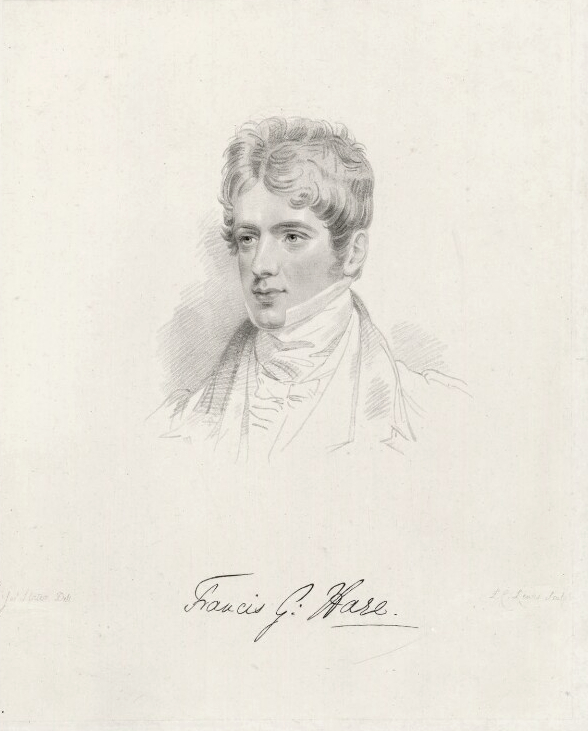
Francis George Hare

Francis George Hare or Hare-Naylor (1786–1842) was a well-connected English dandy and independent scholar, who spent much of his life as an expatriate in Italy. He became a Fellow of the Royal Society in 1812.

== Early life in Italy ==
He was the eldest son of Francis Hare-Naylor and his first wife Georgiana Shipley, born in Italy. At the period of the Italian campaign of 1796–1797, his parents left him in Bologna where they had been living, to return to England on family business after the death of his grandfather Robert Hare-Naylor.

Bologna formed part of the Papal States, but from the Armistice of Bologna in 1796 papal control ceased. The Hare children, apart from the second son Augustus, were left there with a servant, and Francis lodged with the Spanish refugee Jesuit Emanuele Aponte. He was taught by the polyglot Jesuit Giuseppe Gasparo Mezzofanti, and Clotilde Tambroni. At this time Francis Hare met Harry Temple, the future Prime Minister Palmerston, visiting Italy with his father the 2nd Viscount Palmerston, an old friend of Sir William Hamilton who was British envoy at Naples to the Kingdom of Sicily. Hare kept in touch with Temple by letter.

The Hare-Naylors returned to Bologna in 1798, taking back their children Anna Maria (1789–1813), Julius, and Marcus; Francis Hare remained, a pupil for a time of Mezzofanti, but when Aponte returned to Spain after the political changes in the Cisalpine Republic, was left in care in Padua.

== British period ==
Later in the United Kingdom, Hare had as tutors a German, Martin Lehmann-Steglitz, to 1802, and then William Laurence Brown under whom he spent two years at Aberdeen.

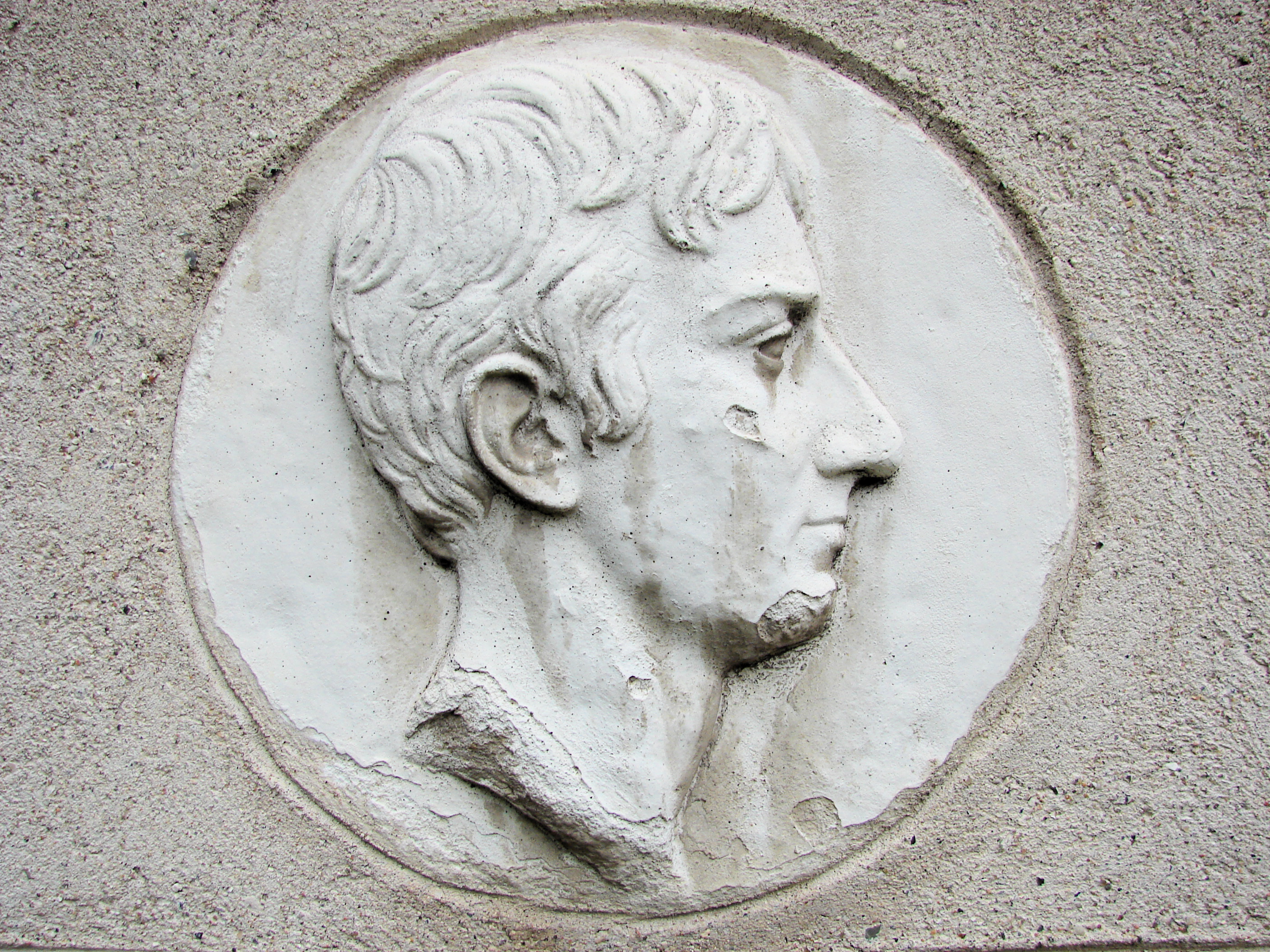
Martin Christian Gottlieb Lehmann (1775–1856), German naturalist and academic

In 1804 Hare entered Lincoln's Inn. That year, until 1806, the Hare-Naylors travelled on continental Europe, in particular Weimar and Switzerland, with Mary Ann Flaxman as governess; Hare's mother died in Lausanne in 1806.

Hare matriculated at Christ Church, Oxford in 1806. His father died in Tours, France in 1815. He met Walter Savage Landor there, in 1814.

According to McFarland, after their father's death, Francis assisted his younger brothers Augustus and Julius "in their formal studies and kept them constantly aware of literary and intellectual developments on the Continent". McFarland also argues that Samuel Taylor Coleridge's correspondent Mr. Hare, in 1816 and 1819, was Francis Hare. Julius Hare attended Coleridge's lectures in 1818.

== Expatriate ==
After an interlude 1816–7 at Melton Mowbray, Hare lived for the rest of his mainly on the continent of Europe. In their time as expatriates in Italy, Hare and Landor became close friends. Seymour Kirkup reported on their disputes, in Florence of the 1820s, typically on points of history, with "both often wrong", and Hare "often astounded at being corrected". By reputation he was "infallible" and a "monster of learning".

Francis Hare died at Palermo on 12 January 1842.

== Works ==
The only acknowledged publications by Francis Hare were contributions to Guesses at Truth, a collection of aphorisms (first edition 1827, anonymous, 2 vols.). It was the work of the four brothers, initially mostly the work of Augustus William Hare, supported by Julius Charles Hare. Francis Hare had a commonplace book of writings, and his aphorisms were signed "R." The other brother Marcus wrote those signed "A."

Hare's son Augustus John Cuthbert Hare cites in his works unpublished Reminiscences by his father.

== Reputation and associations ==
Hare was "a celebrated wit and conversationalist, sarcastically nicknamed 'the silent Hare' for his loquacity." Lady Blessington found him "gay, clever and amusing". His son Augustus in 1886, writing to a relation, called him "a self-indulgent dandy". According to Rees Howell Gronow

He could not only speak every European language, but all the various patois of each tongue, with a rapid and effervescent utterance that reminded one of the rushing of some Alpine torrent, or Pyrenean Gave battling with the impediments that obstruct its course.

A witticism attributed to Hare: when William Drummond of Logiealmond, noted for his gambling, said in public he had just lost his wife, Hare replied "Lost! What at? Quinze or Hazard?"

Hare had a good friend in John Nicholas Fazakerley. He associated with the Earl of Desart, Earl of Bristol and Count d'Orsay. He was on good terms with Lady Oxford, separated from her husband, and her daughters.

At a London dinner party in 1839 given by Richard Monckton Milnes, Charles Sumner encountered "Italian Hare", in the company of Edward Bulwer-Lytton, Charles Macaulay, Robert Monteith and Stafford O'Brien.

Somerset Maugham, doubtless reflecting the conclusions of his friend Augustus John Cuthbert Hare, wrote that Francis Hare

"...came into possession of what remained of the family fortunes, and proceeded to live a life of pleasure till his circumstances obliged him, like many another spendthrift at that time, to take up his residence on the Continent. But he was apparently still well enough off to give large dinner parties twice a week."

== Family ==
Hare married in 1828 Anne Frances Paul (died 1864), eldest daughter of Sir John Dean Paul, 1st Baronet. Their children included:

- Francis George Hare (1830–1868), army officer, gambler imprisoned for debt and follower of Garibaldi.
- William Robert Hare (1831–1867), army officer.
- Anne Frances Mary Louisa (1832–1868). She became a Roman Catholic convert in 1854.

Their son Augustus John Cuthbert Hare (1834–1903) was adopted when young by Maria Hare, widow of Augustus William Hare.

== Reynolds portrait ==
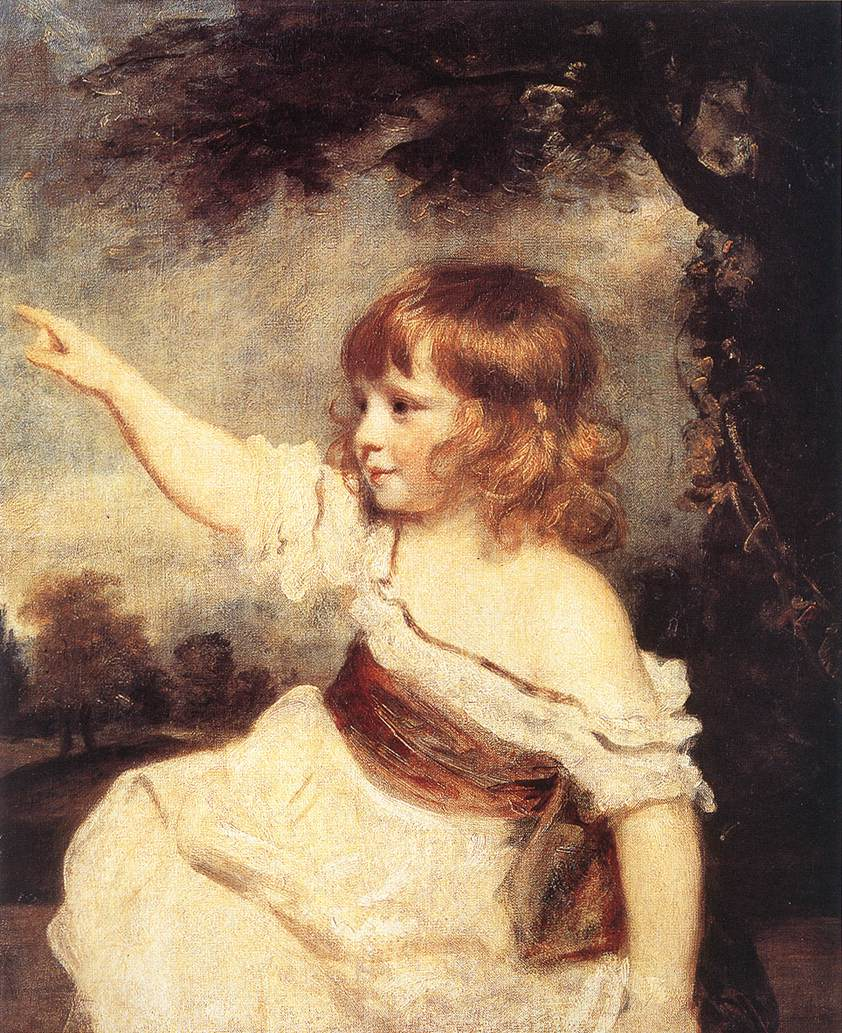
"Master Hare" by Joshua Reynolds, 1788/9

Hare as an infant sat in 1788 for a portrait by Joshua Reynolds, now in the Louvre. It was painted for Lady Jones, wife of William Jones and Hare's aunt.

The work's later provenance was to Louisa Shipley, sister of Lady Jones, and to Marcus Hare. It was left in 1855 by his brother Julius to Maria Hare, widow of his brother Augustus William. It was later claimed by Francis Hare's daughter. Following an 1869 case Paul v Hare heard before John Mellor at Westminster Hall, ownership changed. (The defendants won the case, but the daughter had died in 1868, and Maria Hare died in 1870.)
