= Francis Hare =

Francis Hare may refer to:

- Francis Hare (bishop) (1671–1740), English churchman and classical scholar
- Francis George Hare (1786–1842), British expatriate in Italy
- Francis Augustus Hare (1830–1892), a police officer in Victoria (Australia) who led the pursuit of Ned Kelly and his gang
- Francis W. E. Hare (1858–1928), Irish physician and low-carbohydrate diet advocate
- Francis Hare, 6th Earl of Listowel (born 1964), Irish and British peer

== See also ==
- Francis Hare-Naylor (1753–1815), English historical author
