= Hare-Naylor =

Hare-Naylor is a surname. Notable people with the surname include:

- Francis Hare-Naylor (1753–1815), English historian, novelist and playwright
- Georgiana Hare-Naylor (c. 1755–1806), English painter
