= Francis Hare-Naylor =

English historian, novelist and playwright

Francis Hare-Naylor (1753–1815) was an English historian, novelist and playwright. He eloped with the painter Georgiana Hare-Naylor and they had most of their children abroad. They returned to Herstmonceux when his father died. Georgiana died in Lausanne; Hare-Naylor then sold family property at Herstmonceux and never returned.

== Early life ==
He was the eldest son of Robert Hare-Naylor of Herstmonceux in Sussex, canon of Winchester (son of Francis Hare), by his first wife, Sarah, daughter of Lister Selman of Chalfont St Peter, Buckinghamshire. Sarah died when Francis was a child. The raconteur Augustus John Cuthbert Hare attributes the loss of his kinswoman to:

a chill brought on by eating too many ices when over-heated by dancing at Sir John Shaw's, at Eltham, leaving to the Hares a diamond necklace, valued at £30,000, and three children, Francis, Robert, and Anna Maria.

His father took as his second wife another heiress, Henrietta Henckell. She persuaded her husband into demolitions of Herstmonceaux Castle, for the construction of a house to be settled on her own children.

Francis Hare-Naylor had a legacy from his mother, and lived almost entirely in London. There he formed a friendship with Charles James Fox, and became one of the circle around Georgiana Cavendish, Duchess of Devonshire at Chiswick. She introduced him to her cousin Georgiana Shipley, fourth daughter of Jonathan Shipley, who had learned painting in Joshua Reynolds's studio. Her eldest sister Anna Maria was the wife of Sir William Jones.

== Marriage ==
Bishop Shipley invited Hare-Naylor to Twyford, but the following day he was arrested for debt while driving in the episcopal coach with Georgiana and her parents. He was then forbidden the house. The Duchess of Devonshire gave the pair an annuity of £200 a year, and on this they married. They went to Karlsruhe, and then to the north of Italy.

In 1797 Hare's father died, and it was found that his second wife had built her new house of Herstmonceaux Place on entailed land. The Hare-Naylors set off for England, leaving three of their children in the care of Prof. Clotilda Tambroni and a Spanish priest, and appointing the polyglot Giuseppe Caspar Mezzofanti as tutor of their precocious eldest son.

The Hare-Naylors settled at Herstmonceaux. Hare-Naylor's democratic principles made enemies, and he rejected a baronetcy. From 1799, when the Hare-Naylors fetched home their children, life became a financial struggle, requiring support from the now-widowed Lady Jones.

== Later life ==
In 1803 Georgiana Hare-Naylor completed pictures recording Herstmonceaux Castle as it appeared before the demolitions, but then lost her sight. In the following year the Hare-Naylors went to live in Weimar, where the reigning duchess was on good terms with the family.

On Easter Sunday, 1806, Georgiana Hare-Naylor died at Lausanne, leaving her children to the care of Lady Jones (her eldest sister), who adopted or became guardian to them. After his wife's death Hare-Naylor never returned to Herstmonceaux, and in 1807 he sold the estate. In April 1815 he died, after a lingering illness, at Tours, and was buried beneath the altar of Herstmonceaux Church.

== Works ==
Hare-Naylor wrote unperformed plays, The Mirror and The Age of Chivalry, which were rejected at Drury Lane. In 1801 he published his History of the Helvetic Republics (i.e. Switzerland, two volumes, second enlarged edition 4 volumes 1809). While at Weimar, Hare-Naylor published a novel, Theodore, or the Enthusiast, for which John Flaxman, whose sister Maria Flaxman was his children's governess, made a series of illustrations. In 1816 Hare-Naylor's best-known work, a Civil and Military History of Germany, from the landing of Gustavus to the Treaty of Westphalia, was published.

== Family ==
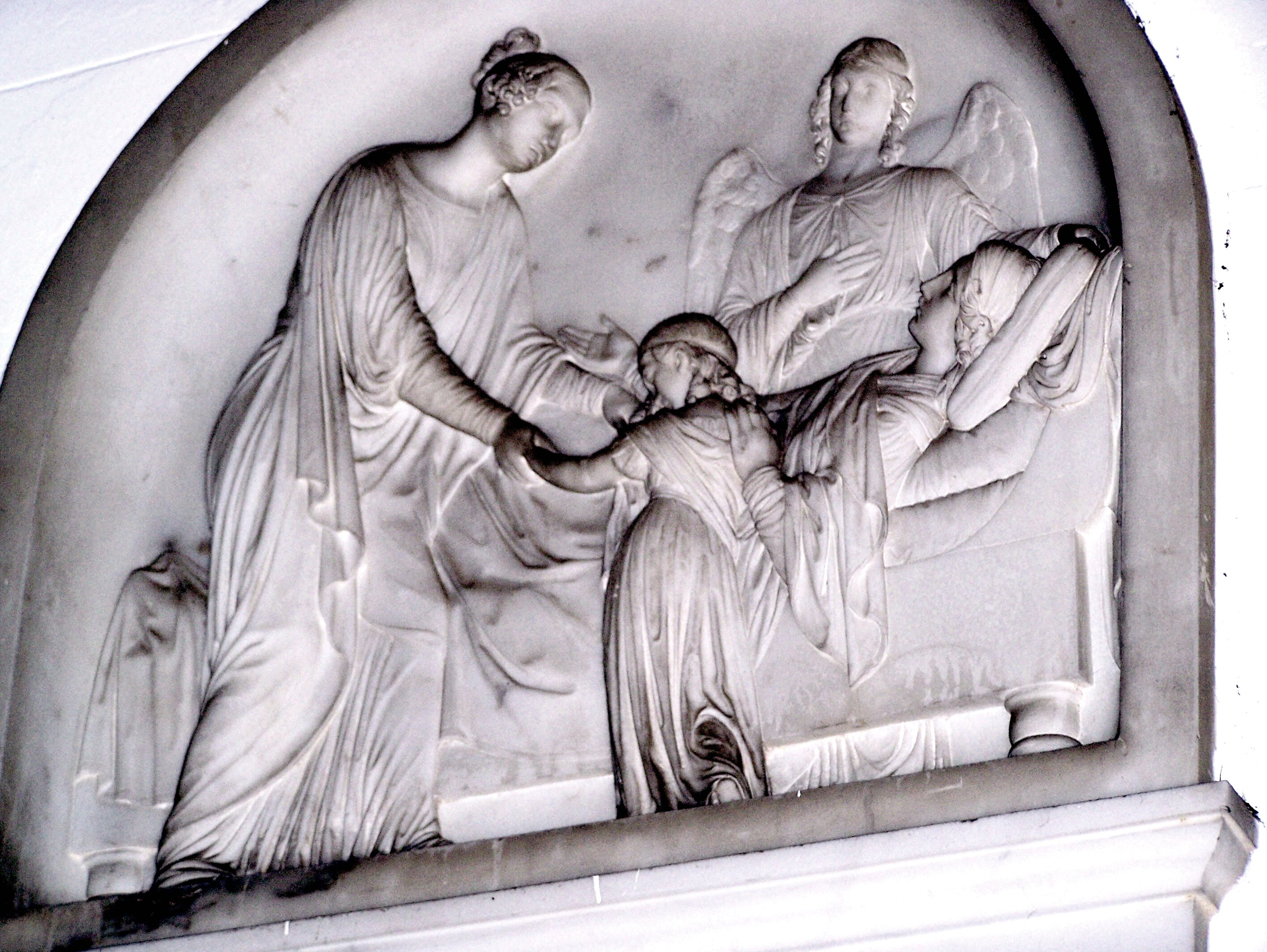
A memorial by Mathieu Kessels to Georgiana Hare-Naylor on her deathbed, entrusting the care of her daughter to Lady Jones

The four sons of Francis with Georgiana Hare-Naylor, Francis, Augustus, Julius, and Marcus, were born in Italy, and a daughter, Anna Maria Clementina. Georgiana died in 1806.

In 1807, Hare-Taylor married again, to Anna Maria Mealy née Hamilton, widow of Ridgeway Mealy, an officer of the 2nd/18th Madras Native Infantry who had died in 1805 in the Nandi Hills. She was a relation of his first wife. The couple had a daughter and two sons:

- Georgiana Frances (1809–1896), who married as his second wife of Frederick Denison Maurice.
- Gustavus Edward Cockburn Hare (1811–1881), a Prussian Army officer, civil servant and landowner.
- Reginald John Hare (1812–1895), Sub-Inspector of Constabulary in Australia

== Notes ==
Attribution

This article incorporates text from a publication now in the public domain: Stephen, Leslie; Lee, Sidney, eds. (1890). "Hare-Naylor, Francis". Dictionary of National Biography. Vol. 24. London: Smith, Elder & Co.
