= Thomas Edwards (English clergyman, died 1842) =

English clergyman, died 1842

Thomas Edwards, LL.D. (fl. 1774 – died 4 July 1842) was an English clergyman.

== Life ==
Edwards was the son of Thomas Edwards. He graduated LL.B. in 1782 from Clare College, Cambridge. In 1783 he became a fellow of Jesus College, Cambridge, taking his LL.D. degree there in 1787. He was made vicar of Hinxton in Cambridgeshire that year 1787, and was vicar of Histon from 1789 to 1808.

Edwards published various sermons as well as the works listed below. N. Nisbett, rector of Tunstall, made several attacks upon Edwards's biblical criticisms.

== Works ==
- (ed.) De Educatione Liberorum, by Plutarch, with notes, 1791, 8vo.
- A Discourse on the Limits and Importance of Free Inquiry in matters of Religion, Butt, 1792, 8vo.
- Remarks on Dr. Kipling s Preface to Beza, part i. 1793, 8vo.
- Criticisms relating to the Dead, London, 1810, 8vo.
