= Buckingham Street =

Buckingham Street may refer to:

- Buckingham Street, London, England, United Kingdom
- Greenwell Street, formerly Buckingham Street, London
- Buckingham Street, Dublin, Ireland
