= Tambroni =

Tambroni is a surname. Notable people with the surname include:

- Fernando Tambroni (1901–1963), Italian politician
- Clotilde Tambroni (1758–1817), Italian philologist
