= Robert Payne (cricketer) =

English cricketer

Personal information
- Full name: Robert Adair Payne
- Born: 22 October 1811; Clifton, Bristol, England
- Died: Unknown
- Batting: Unknown

Domestic team information
- Years: Team
- 1832: Oxford University

Career statistics
Competition	First-class
Matches	2
Runs scored	70
Batting average	17.50
100s/50s	–/1
Top score	52
Catches/stumpings	5/–
- Source: Cricinfo, 23 June 2020

Robert Adair Payne (22 October 1811 – date of death unknown) was an English first-class cricketer.

The son of William Payne, he was born in October 1811 at Clifton, Bristol. He was educated at Harrow School, before going up to Oriel College, Oxford. While studying at Oxford, he played first-class cricket for Oxford University in 1832, making two appearances against the Marylebone Cricket Club at Oxford and Lord's. His score of 52 at Oxford was the second half century made in first-class cricket for Oxford University, following Rice Price's 71 against Cambridge in Oxford's inaugural first-class match in 1827.
