= Frederic Boase =

English librarian and biographer

Frederic Boase (7 October 1843 – 23 December 1916) was a Cornish librarian and biographer.

== Family ==
He was born at Lariggan, Penzance, Cornwall to John Josias Arthur Boase (1801–1896), banker, and his wife, Charlotte née Scholl (1802–1873). The youngest of four boys and two girls, he went to school at Penzance and Bromsgrove grammar schools between 1855 and 1859. Unmarried, he died at St Leonards on 23 December 1916.

== Career ==
He was trained in the field of law, but did not make a career of it. He was admitted a solicitor on 31 January 1867, and went into practice at Exmouth, Devon. In 1877 he was appointed as librarian to the Incorporated Law Society, retiring in September 1903.

His major work was Modern English Biography. It was published in three volumes from 1892 to 1901. These were followed by a supplement of three volumes. The work eventually contained 30,000 biographies of people dying in the period 1851 to 1900.

== Notes ==
- Lloyd, H. F.; Lloyd, Myfanwy. "Boase, Frederic (1843–1916)". Oxford Dictionary of National Biography (online ed.). Oxford University Press. doi:10.1093/ref:odnb/37202. (Subscription, Wikipedia Library access or UK public library membership required.)
- "Obituary" (1917) 10 Law Library Journal 12 (21-27 June 1917) Google Books
- "Obituary" (1918) 19 Library Association Record 80 Google Books
- (1917) 19 Library World 213 Google Books:
- (1917) 142 Law Times 141 (6 January 1917) Google Books:
- Boase, Frederic. An Account of the families of Boase or Bowes, originally residing at Paul and Madron in Cornwall. 1876. Page 13.
