= Buckwell Place =

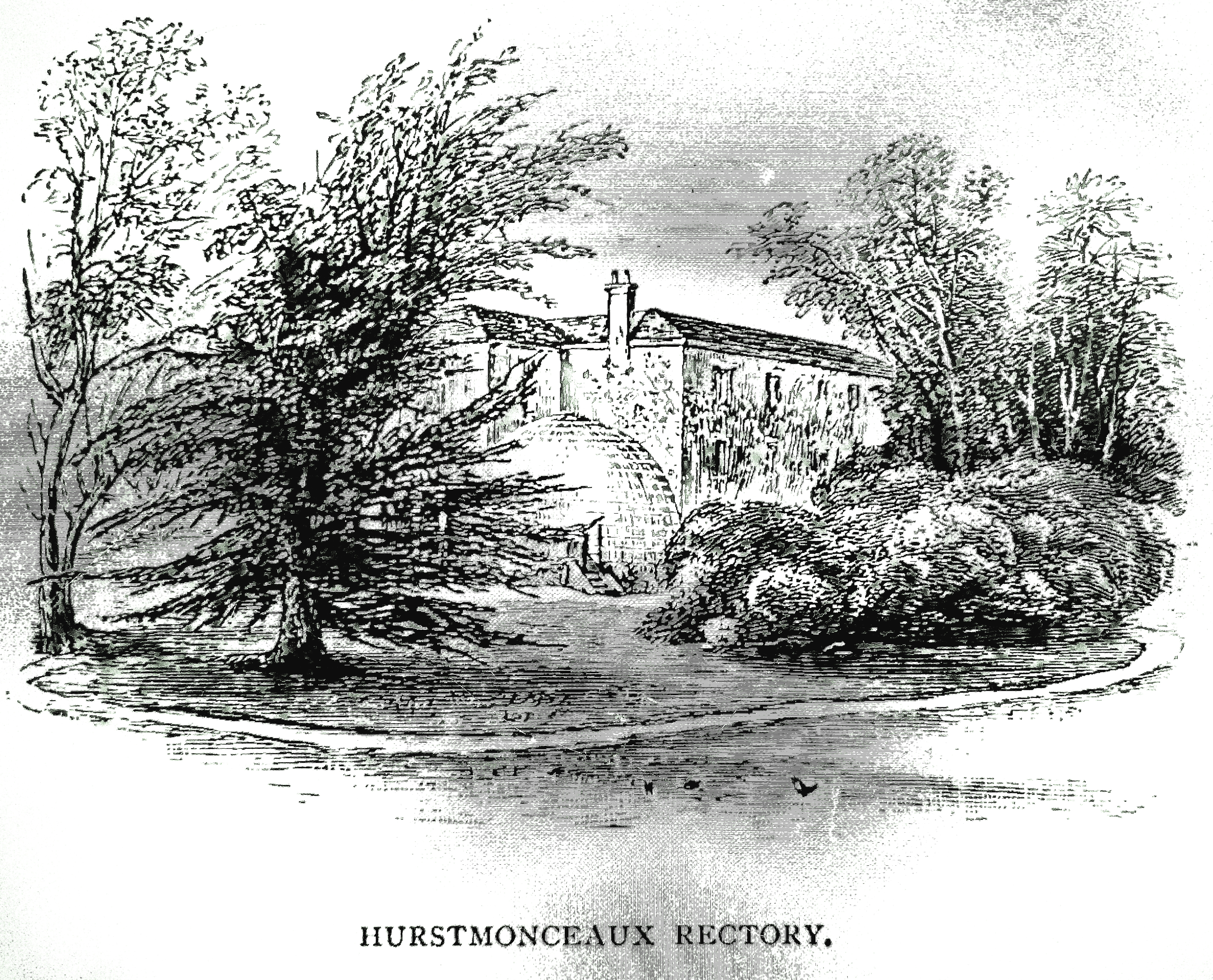
- Buckwell Place (then Herstmonceux Rectory), as illustrated within 'The Story of My Life' by Augustus Hare (1896-1900).
- Interactive map of Buckwell Place
- Coordinates: 50°53′05″N 0°18′40″E
- Built: 1792
- Built for: Rev. Robert Hare

Listed Building – Grade II*

Buckwell Place (formerly Herstmonceux Rectory) is a country house within the civil parish of Herstmonceux, East Sussex, England. It is a privately owned Grade II* listed building, and is not open to the public.

Herstmonceux Rectory was the residence of the theologian Julius Charles Hare.

== History ==
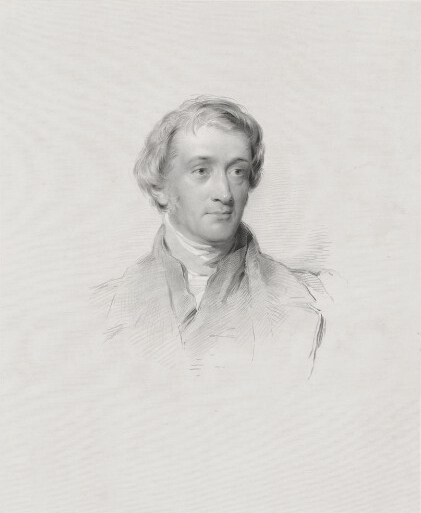
Julius Charles Hare

Rev. Robert Hare. of the Hare family who owned nearby Herstmonceux Castle, built the original wing of the house in 1792 as a rectory for himself. His nephew Julius Charles Hare later occupied the house and extended it in 1833, constructing a parlour wing and bedroom above. He also built a domed conservatory between the original wing and the new parlour wing.

Julius Hare was a bibliophile, with a library at the rectory of 20,000 volumes, particularly strong in contemporary German authors. His visitors included Thomas Carlyle, with whom he later fell out. Hare's German books were later bequeathed to Trinity College, Cambridge.

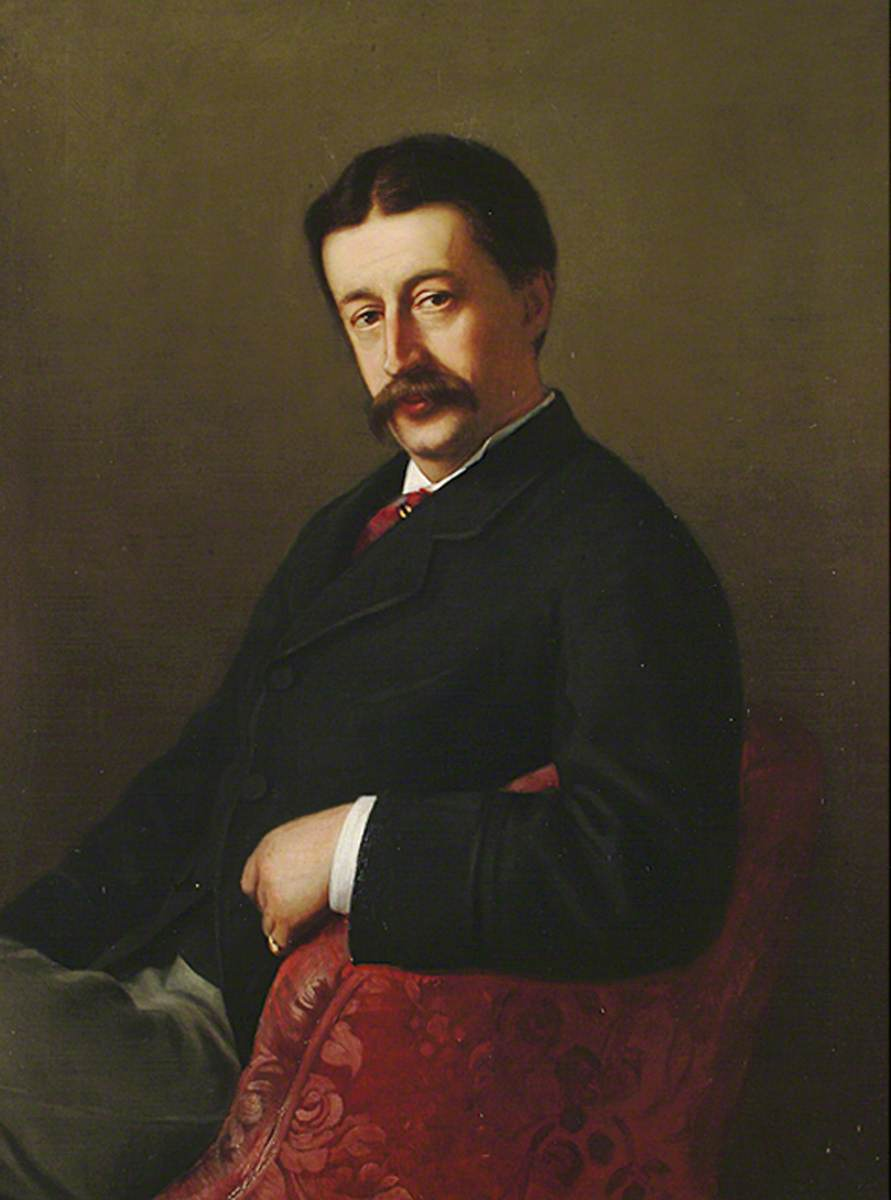
Augustus Hare, 1879 portrait

The writer Augustus Hare was adopted by his aunt Maria Hare, the widowed sister-in-law of Julius Hare, and brought up at Lime House, near the rectory. He wrote about his childhood experiences at the rectory in his autobiography, The Story of My Life (1896–1900).

After Julius Hare's death in 1855, the house was occupied by the Rev. Henry Wellesley. Wellesley constructed a service wing to the west in c.1860. It remains a private house today. In 1932, the house was still known as Herstmonceux Rectory, but by 1937, was listed as Buckwell Place.

== Architecture ==
Buckwell Place consists of the original rectory built by Rev. Robert Hare in 1792, the extensions — including the domed conservatory —- by Julius Hare in 1833 and the service wing built by Rev. Henry Wellesley in c.1860. The architect is unknown, and likely to have been a local builder.

The northeast entrance front was constructed in 1792. It has two storeys and four bays. The front door features a Gibbs surround, set within a curved recess. The southeast garden front is similarly of two storeys and four bays. The southwest front exhibits the parlour wing built in 1833 by Julius Hare, which has a canted bay window and balcony above. To the west of the house lies the range constructed in c.1860 by Rev. Henry Wellesley, with a set of tripartite windows to the ground floor. Between the southeast garden front and the southwest parlour wing, Julius Hare constructed a domed conservatory in 1833 for the display of ferns and other tropical plants.

The house retains its original curved staircase, along with the 1833 marble fireplace surround in Julius Hare's library and its bookcases.
