= Greenwell Street =

Street in the City of Westminster, London

Coordinates: 51°31′22.7″N 0°8′33.2″W

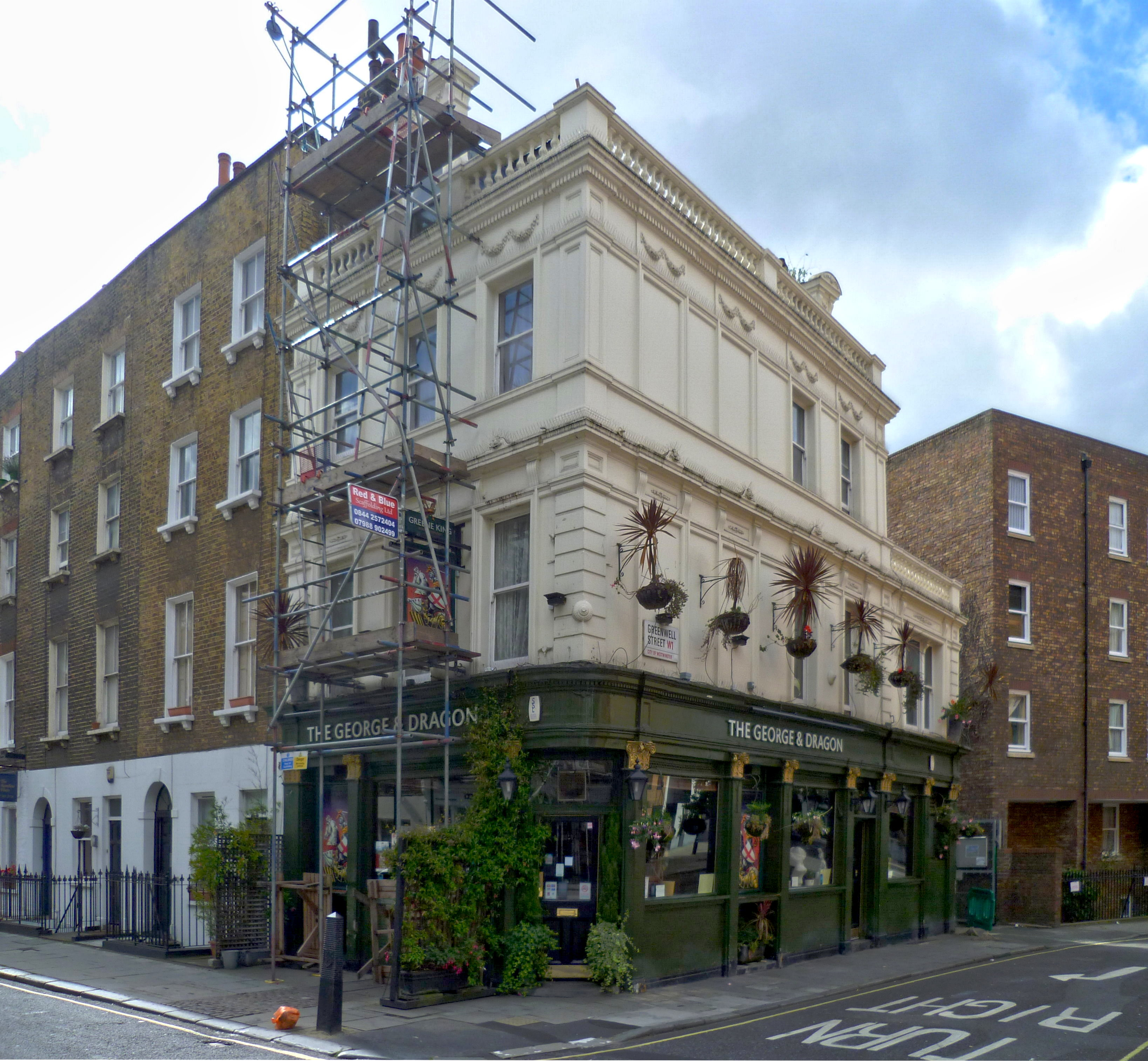
The George & Dragon pub in Greenwell Street

Greenwell Street, formerly Buckingham Street, is located in the East Marylebone district of the City of Westminster in London. It was built in the late eighteenth century and runs between Bolsover Street in the east and Cleveland Street in the west. Great Titchfield Street joins it on its south side. On the south side is the grade II listed George and Dragon public house (c.1850) and the site of the home of the sculptor John Flaxman, the location of which is marked by a plaque.

There are also plaques to the chemist William Hyde Wollaston who worked on platinum in his laboratory there, and from the former buildings of the Royal National Orthopaedic Hospital whose outpatient assessment centre is located in a new building on the north side on the corner with Bolsover Street. The plasterer and scagliola manufacturer Vincent Bellman and his successors in trade had their business at number 14 from 1832 until 1877 where at one stage they employed 68 men and boys. The street was badly damaged by German bombing during the Second World War and has been subject to redevelopment in the post-war period so that, apart from the pub, all of its buildings are of modern construction.

== Origins and location ==
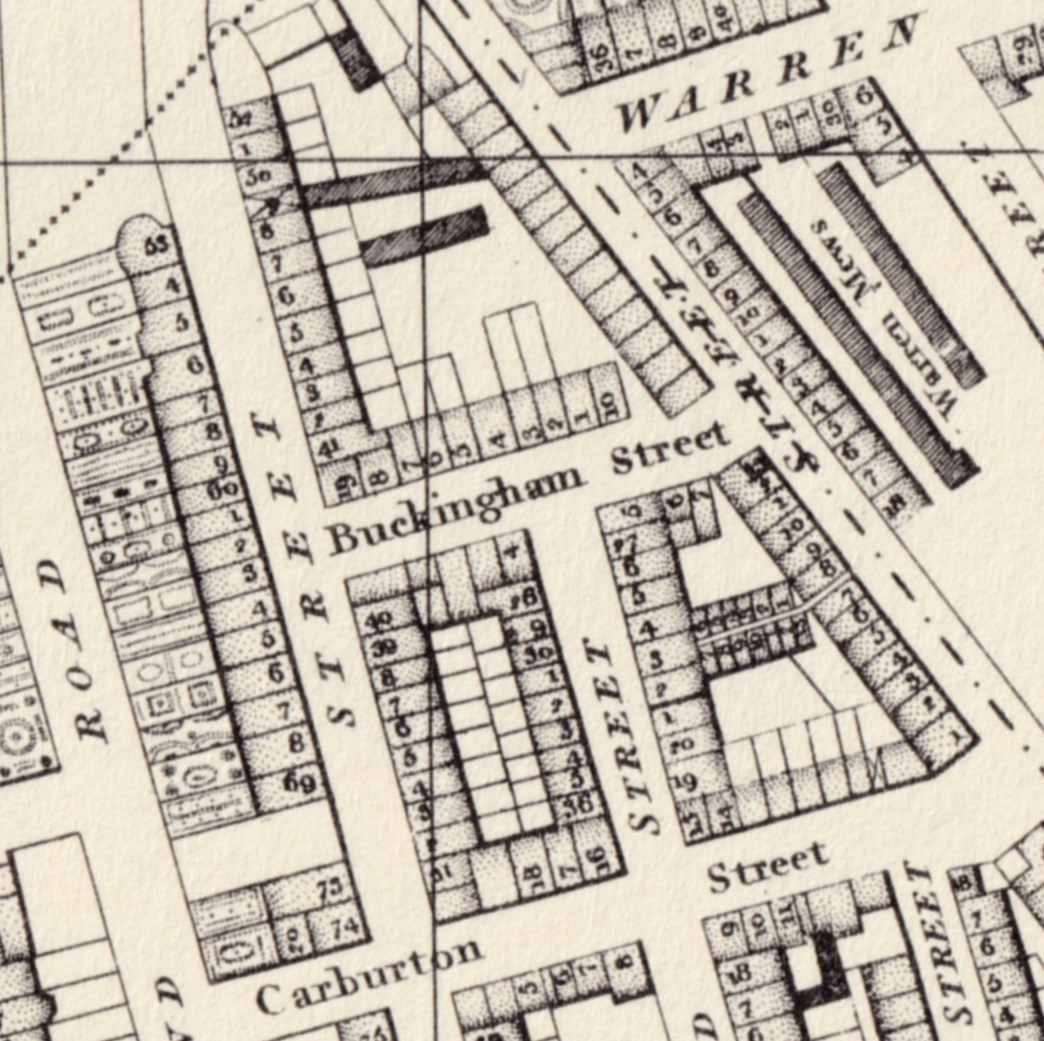
Buckingham Street on Richard Horwood's map of 1813

Greenwell Street is located in the Fitzrovia district of the City of Westminster in London. It was built in the late eighteenth century and runs between Bolsover Street in the east and Cleveland Street in the west. Great Titchfield Street joins it on its south side. It was formerly known as Buckingham Street but was renamed in 1937 to remember the Greenwell family who were prominent in the Marylebone area. James Hugo Greenwell and his son Walpole Eyre Greenwell both served as vestry clerks in the nineteenth century. The street forms the northern edge of what is known as the "Carburton Street triangle" but which is actually a trapezoid with Carburton Street along the base.

== 19th Century ==
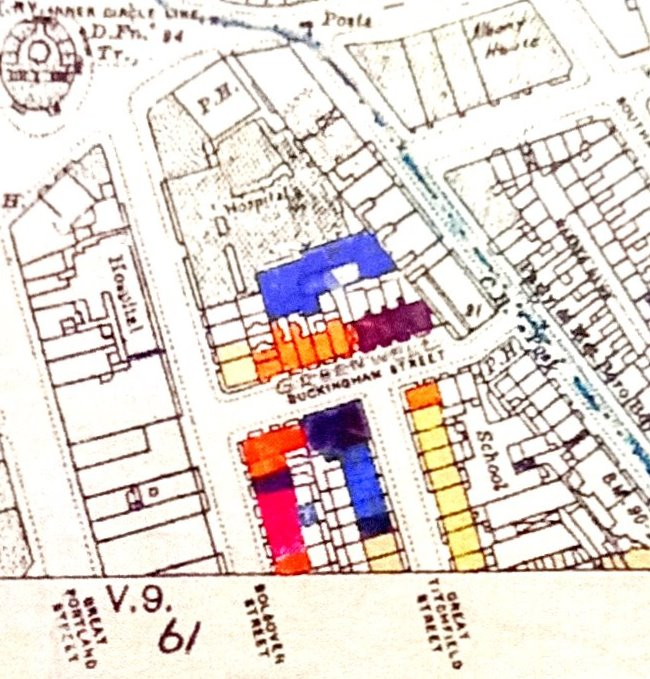
London County Council bomb damage map of the Greenwell Street area (darker colours indicate more severe damage)

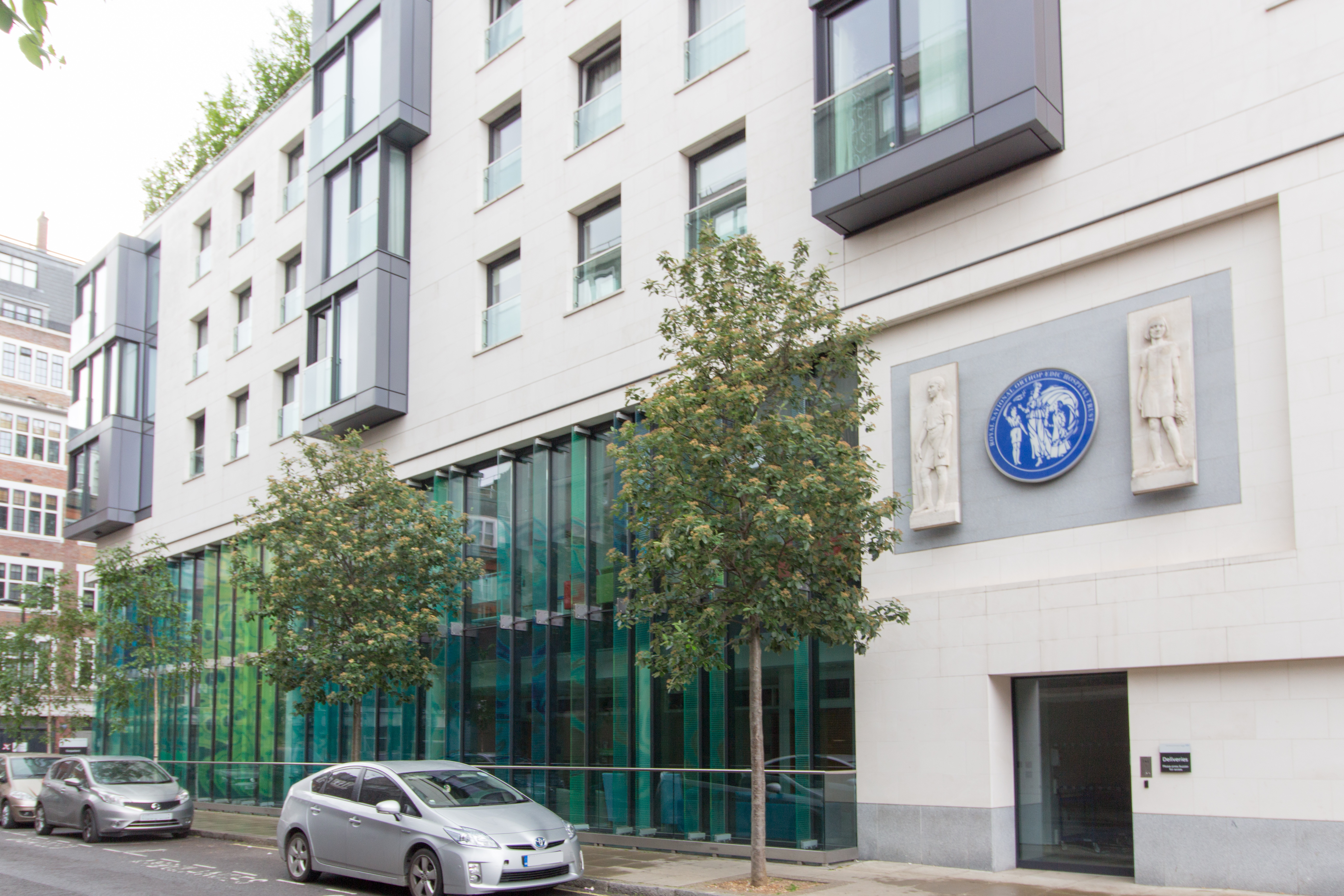
The new Royal National Orthopaedic Hospital Trust building in Bolsover and Greenwell streets with plaque

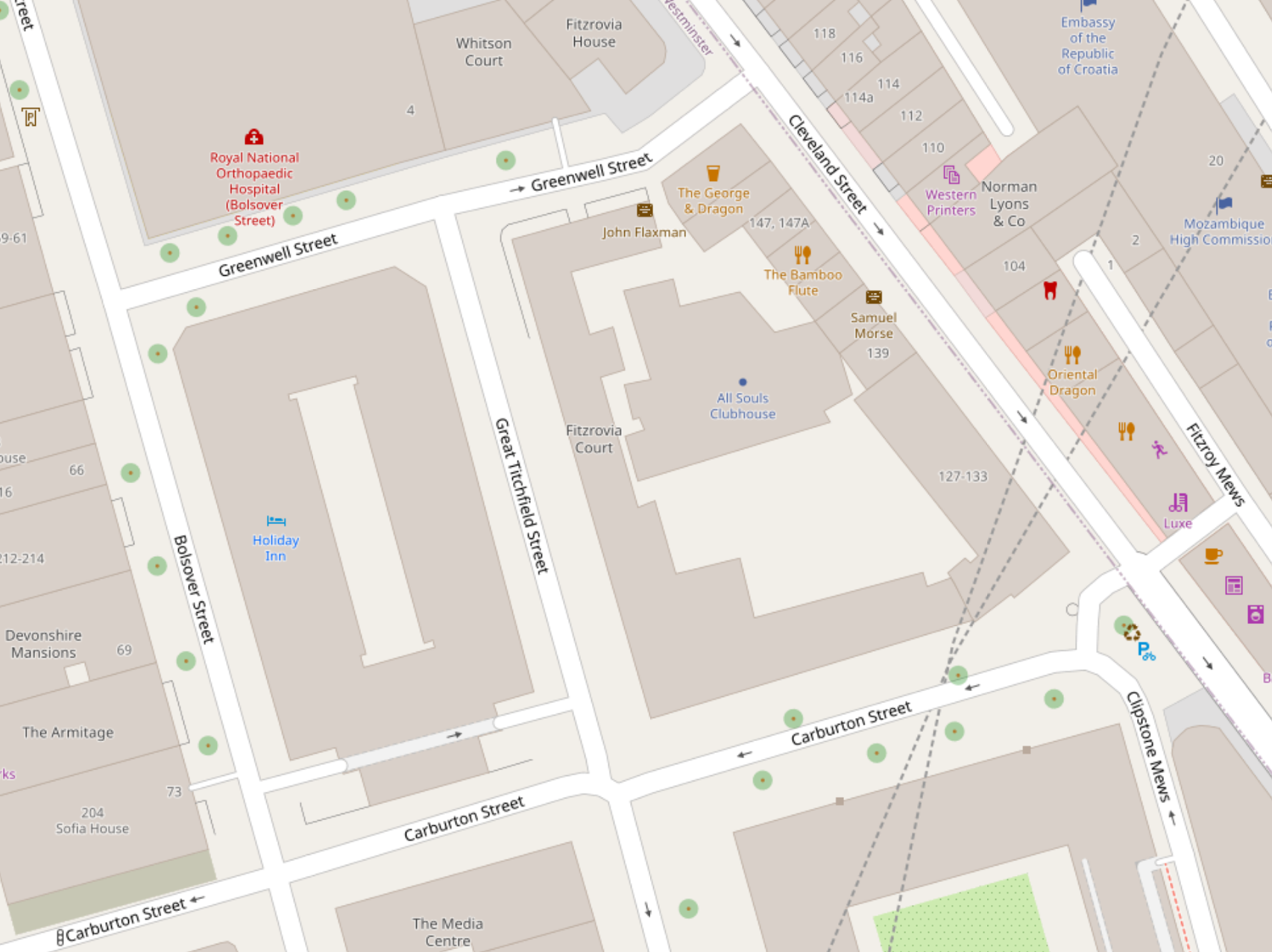
Greenwell Street area map, 2022

A number of artisans and others operated from yards and gardens behind street frontages as was common in the area.

The sculptor John Flaxman lived at number 7 with his wife Ann from 1795 until his death in 1826. Maria (Mary Ann) Flaxman joined them by 1807. John Flaxman had his studio at the house and his assistants would create his sculptures in the yard at the back using scale models that he made. After his death, his assistant and brother-in-law Thomas Denman carried on the business from the same address until around 1840. A Society of Arts plaque was installed around 1870. When the local authority wished to demolish the house and its neighbours in the 1970s, the Flaxman connection was used by opponents to the council's scheme. When the house was eventually demolished, the plaque was moved to the replacement buildings.

The chemist and physiologist William Hyde Wollaston also found his back garden useful when he lived at number 14 from 1801, building a laboratory there in which he invented a method of rendering platinum metal malleable, which was said to have earned him £30,000.

Vincent Bellman (c.1796–1860), plasterer and scagliola manufacturer, had his business at number 14 from 1832 until the year of his death, after which the business was continued by John Ivey (1794–1874) as Bellman & Ivey in the same location until 1877 when it moved to Edward Street, near Dorset Square. In 1861, the firm in "Buckingham Street Yard" employed 57 men and 11 boys.

The George and Dragon public house was built around 1850 on the south side on the corner with Cleveland Street. It is grade II listed with Historic England and is the only original building left in the street. It is in the Italianate style, stuccoed, with a pilastered front.

In 1852, a school was created to the south of Greenwell Street for boys of the parish of Holy Trinity in Marylebone Road. Flaxman's former house at number 7 was bought by the rector of Holy Trinity and the school accessed through a passageway on the north side of Greenwell Street alongside the house. The school later expanded to include girls and infants but closed in 1914 after which it became a parish clubhouse and, after the church closed in 1958, was renamed All Souls' Clubhouse.

== 20th Century ==
In 1908, an Out-Patients Department and Nurses' Home was built on the corner of Bolsover and Greenwell streets for the Royal National Orthopaedic Hospital. The companion in-patient building was under simultaneous construction on the western side of Bolsover street.

Greenwell Street was hit by German bombing during the Second World War with the majority of the buildings shown as damaged beyond repair or seriously damaged on the London County Council bomb damage maps. The pub was undamaged.

== Modern buildings ==
Apart from the George and Dragon, all the buildings in the street are modern, being made up on the northern side of Fitzrovia House on the corner with Cleveland House, the flats known as Whitson Court, and on the corner with Bolsover Street the new Royal National Orthopaedic Hospital Trust Outpatient Assessment Centre which opened in 2009. This last features, on the Greenwell side, relief sculptures of a boy holding a cricket bat and a girl with flowers which were salvaged from above the main entrance in Bolsover Street when the original hospital was demolished in 2007–08.

On the south side are the new houses built between the pub and Great Titchfield Street that controversially replaced the former home of the Flaxmans, and on the western end between Great Titchfield and Bolsover Street is the rear of the Holiday Inn London – Regent's Park hotel (originally the Regent Crest Hotel built in 1972) in Carburton Street.

== Notable former residents ==
Former residents include:

- John Flaxman (1755–1826), sculptor, No. 7, 1795–1826
- Maria Flaxman (1768–1833), painter, No. 7, 1807–?
- William Hyde Wollaston (1766–1828), chemist and physiologist, No. 14, c. 1801–25 (plaque erected in 1933)
