= Rice Price =

English cricketer, academic, and cleric

Rice Price (3 January 1807 – 30 November 1845) was an English academic and cleric, who was also a cricketer with amateur status. He was associated with Oxford University and made his debut in 1827.

Price was educated at Winchester College and New College, Oxford, where he matriculated on 21 January 1826 and on 26 January became a "Founder's-kin Fellow". He remained at New College for the rest of his life: after graduating B.A. in 1829, he became a Church of England priest and was dean of arts in 1834, bursar in 1835 and dean of divinity from 1836. He died at New College. His name "Rice" is an anglicised version of Welsh Rhys.

== Bibliography ==
- Haygarth, Arthur (1996) [1862]. Scores & Biographies, Volume 1 (1744–1826). Kennington: Frederick Lillywhite. ISBN 978-19-00592-23-9.
- Haygarth, Arthur (1997) [1862]. Scores & Biographies, Volume 2 (1827–1840). Kennington: Frederick Lillywhite. ISBN 978-19-00592-23-9.
