= Traditional regional associations of Oxford Colleges =

For periods up to the middle of the nineteenth century, a number of colleges of the University of Oxford had explicit regional associations, that functioned in particular as catchment areas from which they drew students and Fellows. Conspicuous examples were Balliol College and Scotland, and Jesus College and Wales. Others were Exeter College with Cornwall and Devon; Wadham College with Dorset and Somerset; Brasenose College with Lancashire and Cheshire; and The Queen's College with Cumberland and Westmorland.

One way in which these relationships were expressed was the existence of endowments for closed scholarships, restricted to undergraduates from a given area or school. Privileges linked to founder's kin were also prevalent. As a consequence of the Oxford University Act 1854, much of that system of scholarships was reformed, after which the geographical distribution of students, which was never rigidly defined, became more uniform.

== Balliol College ==
For example, for Balliol there was the "traditional link" between Scotland and the College. From the 17th century it amounted to the scholarships endowed by John Snell, for University of Glasgow students.

== Exeter College ==
At the beginning of the 19th century, Exeter College's student intake was 40% taken from South West England. Its selection of Fellows had geographical restrictions, but was not limited to internal candidates.

== Queen's College ==
The running of The Queen's College, Oxford was marked for centuries by the wishes of its founder in 1341, Robert de Eglesfield. Preference for the admission of students ("poor boys") was for candidates from the counties of Cumberland and Westmorland, together with founder's kin. By 1400 the college was closed to all candidates not born in those counties. A chancery case of 1377 confirmed that preference could be given in the same way for elections to fellowships.

In the 16th and 17th century, scholarship funding built up, tied to various regions. In the 18th century, a large benefaction related to candidates from 12 specified grammar schools in Cumberland, Westmorland, and Yorkshire. The academic standards at Queen's were later adversely affected by a lowering of school performance in the northern catchment area. William Thomson made the closed fellowships a political issue, a factor in the Royal Commission on Oxford University convened in 1850.

== St John's College ==
St John's College, Oxford, founded in 1555 by Thomas White, had from the outset a preference for students from Merchant Taylors' School, also founded by White. It also sought students from four grammar schools: Tonbridge School in Kent, Bristol Grammar School in Gloucestershire, Reading School in Berkshire, and King Henry VIII School, Coventry in Warwickshire.
