= Augustus Hare =

English writer (1834–1903)

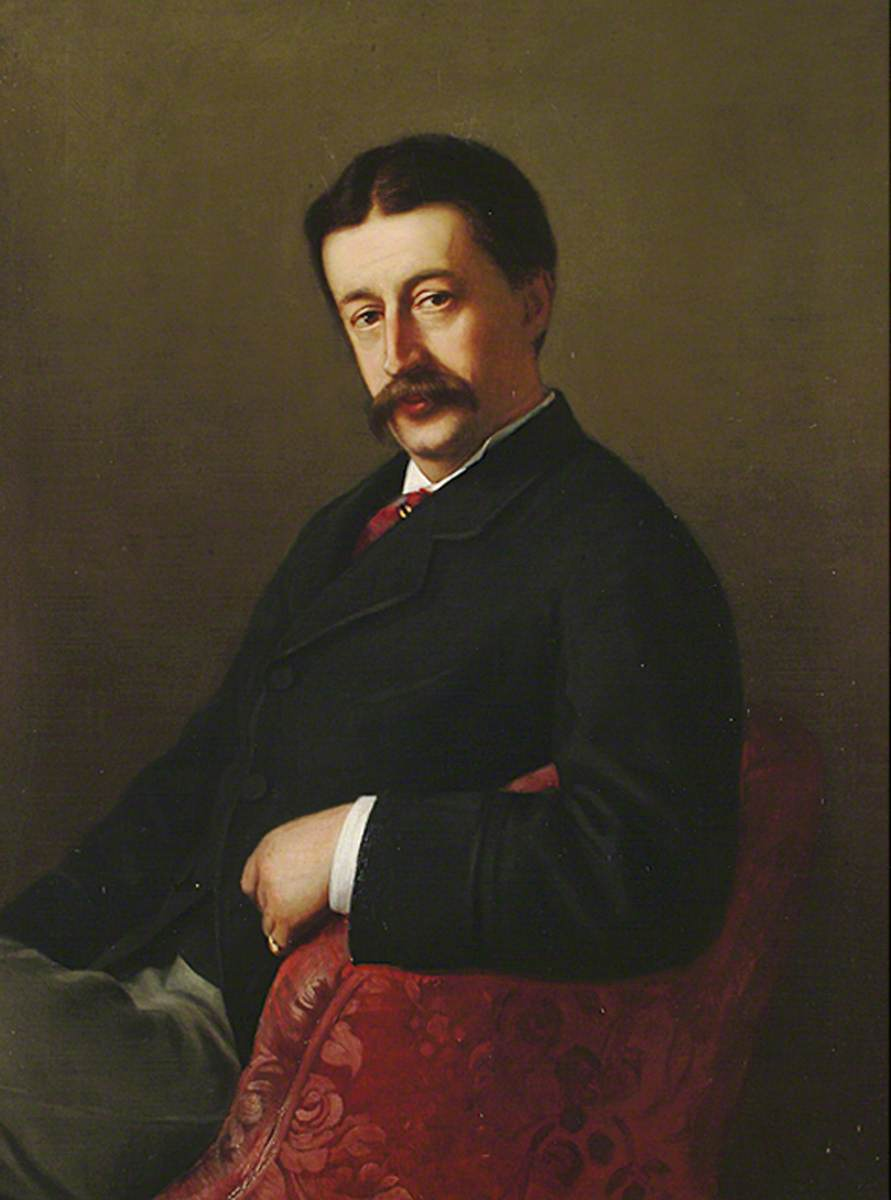
- Augustus Hare, 1879 portrait
- Born: Augustus John Cuthbert Hare; 13 March 1834; Rome, Italy
- Died: 22 January 1903 (aged 68); St Leonards-on-Sea, Hastings, England
- Education: University College, Oxford
- Occupation: Writer
- Writing career
- Genre: Travel literature

Augustus John Cuthbert Hare (13 March 1834 – 22 January 1903) was an English writer, man of letters, and painter. He was best known for his numerous travel memoirs, correspondence with famous literary figures, and autobiography.

== Early life ==
He was born in Rome, the youngest son of Francis George Hare, and his wife Anne Frances Paul, daughter of Sir John Dean Paul, 1st Baronet. He was adopted by his aunt Maria Hare née Leycester, daughter of the Rev. Oswald Leycester, rector of Stoke on Tern, and widow of Augustus William Hare. Julius Hare was his uncle.

A sequence of family events led up to the adoption. Augustus Hare's great-uncle Robert Hare, rector of Herstmonceux, had died in 1832. Augustus William Hare, vicar of Alton Barnes, refused the living, which was in the gift of the Hare family, represented by Francis George Hare who held the advowson. Julius Hare then accepted the living, first making a journey to Italy. Augustus William Hare travelled to Italy for his health, and died at Rome in February 1834; his widow Maria returned to England. Julius Hare took up the post of rector of Herstmonceux and moved into Buckwell Place.

Maria went, firstly, to Alton Barnes to settle her husband's affairs. She then went to the Herstmonceux rectory, at Julius's invitation, and from there arranged for the care of the infant Augustus to be transferred to her. This matter was handled by an English nurse going to Italy. Two months after Augustus arrived with his nurse in Herstmonceux, Maria rented Lime House, near Buckwell Place, as her family home.

== Hare circle ==
John Sterling, a student of Julius Hare at Cambridge, became a curate at Herstmonceux in 1834; while he stayed not much longer than a year, he became a close friend of Maria Hare, who had long conversations with him. He had been an associate a few years earlier of F. D. Maurice, on the Athenaeum, and through him the Hares encountered the Maurice family. He had married in 1830 Susannah Barton; Maurice's first wife was her sister Anna. In 1844 Julius Hare married Esther Maurice, sister of F. D. Maurice.

Maria Hare came under the influence of Priscilla Maurice, another sister of F. D. Maurice, in religious matters, and was a "strong evangelical". From age about 10, Augustus was often at the rectory overnight, suffering from chilblains. He considered himself badly treated there by Esther Hare, a former governess, and by the enforcement of Sunday observances. His later account certainly blackened her reputation, and was coloured by snobbery directed at the Maurices. Barnes stated that the story of the hanging of the cat Selma was corroborated by the Rev. Douglas Hamilton-Gordon, son of the 4th Earl of Aberdeen, a guest at the rectory at the time.

== Education ==
Hare became in 1843 a boarding pupil of the Rev. Robert Kilvert, father of Francis Kilvert, at Harnish Rectory, Hardenhuish, near Chippenham; the Rev. Kilvert had taken over at Alton Barnes after August William Hare's death. He spent one year at Harrow School in 1846/7 but left for health reasons. He attended the Southgate school of the Rev. Charles Bradley (1815–1883), son of Charles Bradley.

In 1853, Hare matriculated at University College, Oxford, where he graduated B.A. in 1856, M.A. in 1859. His first guidebook was written after a journey 1857–8 to Italy.

== After Oxford ==
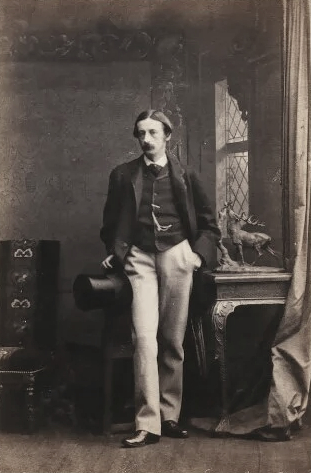
Augustus Hare, 1862 photograph

In 1860 Maria Hare bought a house "Little Ridge", with 36 acres (15 ha), which she and Augustus renamed "Holmhurst St Mary", at Baldslow in East Sussex. They moved out of Lime House, still rented, which had been sold. Hare became the companion of his adoptive mother, by this time an invalid. They travelled regularly in continental Europe.

== Author ==
After the death of Maria in 1870, Hare wrote numerous books as a professional author. His Memorials of a Quiet Life, dealing with the evangelical milieu of his upbringing, was a succès d'estime that opened doors to a wide social acceptance ("when in England much of his time was spent in visiting country-houses").

=== Memorials of a Quiet Life (3 vols. 1872–1876) ===
John Tulloch, in an 1881 article about Arthur Penrhyn Stanley, Maria Hare's nephew, commented:

I read those Memorials last summer amidst some of the scenes depicted in them; and if any wish to see what a beautiful, and in some respects original, atmosphere surrounded Stanley in his youthful years, they deserve attention; they are occasionally tedious, and too "long drawn out," and more may be made of the picture than the subjects warrants; but a most tranquil Christian spirit pervades every page[...]

The work had run to an 18th edition by 1884.

Boase in Modern English Biography wrote that Maria Hare had "written a portion of and collected material for" the Memorials. She had written or dictated something towards the project at the end of her life. Barnes gives family background, on Maria's extensive collecting down the years of family correspondence. Esther Hare, who had died in 1864, had burned many letters, kept in Lime House, without authorisation, while Maria and Augustus were in Italy in 1857; the matter is referred to in the supplementary Volume III of Memorials, where Hare contested the version of the events claimed by Esther's executors. A scathing review in The Spectator in July 1876 said that bad taste "could scarcely go further than this unprovoked attack", based on a "querulous private letter". The potential use of the letters of Catherine Stanley née Leycester, mother of Arthur Penrhyn Stanley, aroused hostility in the Stanley family, who threatened litigation. Hare in any case used some anodyne letters by her, his "Aunt Kitty", who had died in 1862.

A meeting of 1878 in Italy of Hare with Queen Sophia of Nassau, of Sweden and Norway, who found the Memorials a comfort, led to a post with her son the Crown Prince, and a knighthood in the Order of St. Olav. Letters from Hare to the Crown Prince are extant, held by the Bernadotte Family Foundation.

=== The Story of My Life ===
Hare's autobiography The Story of My Life details both a devotion to his adoptive mother Maria, and an intense unhappiness with his home life and early education. Baigent in the Oxford Dictionary of National Biography states that the misery memoir aspect of this work has "unwisely" been taken literally. It appeared in six volumes, published 1896–1900. Sydney Ernest Fryer wrote that it was "long, tedious, and indiscreet", and "owed its vogue to its 'stories' of society." It included a number of accounts of encounters with ghosts. A reviewer in the New York Times concluded that "Mr Hare's ghosts are rather more interesting than his lords or his middle-class people".

=== Travel writer ===
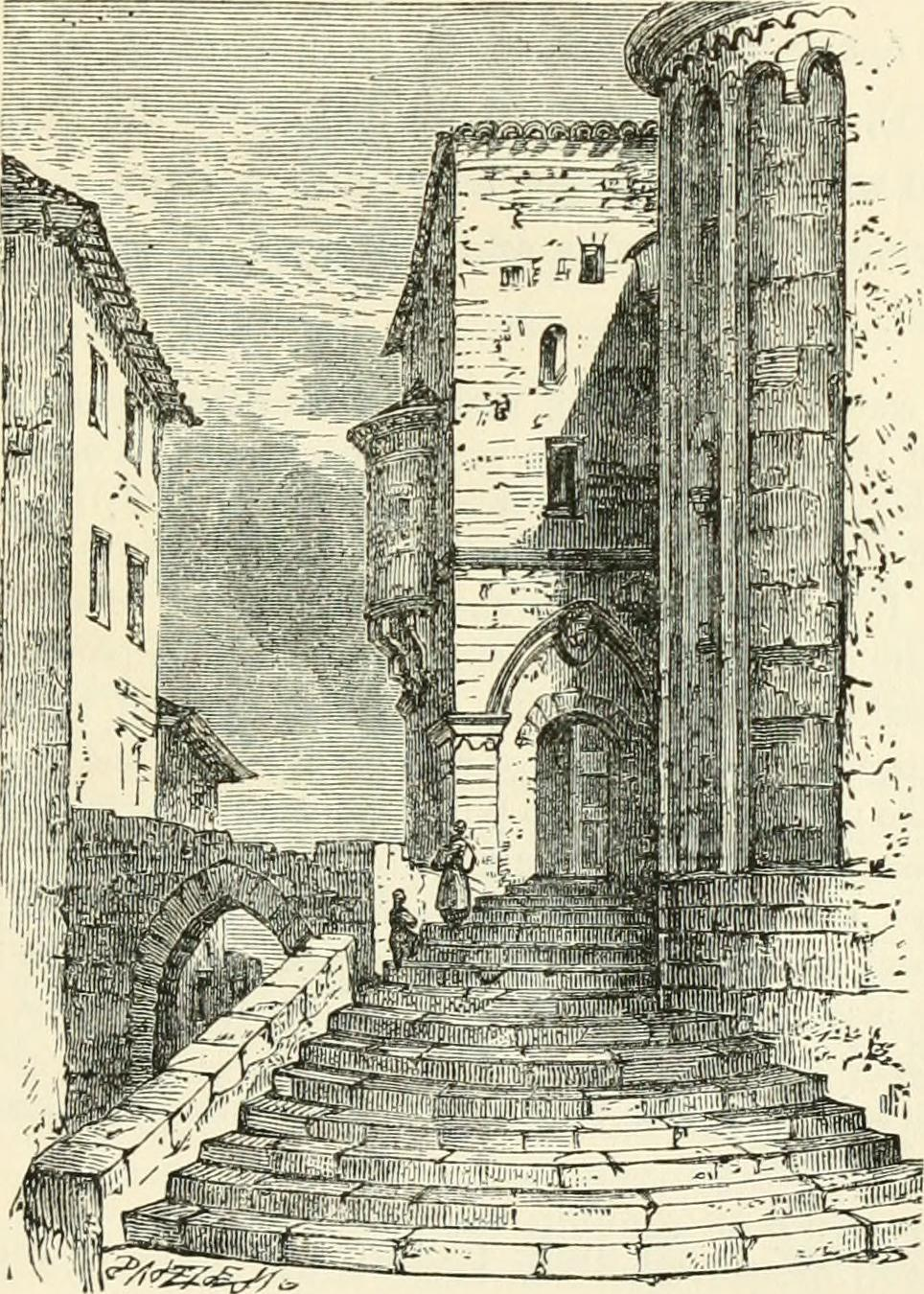
Entrance to the Cathedral, Anagni, engraving after Augustus Hare, from Days near Rome (1875)

Hare was also a travel writer, topographer and illustrator. He began as an author for Murray's Handbooks for Travellers, with a commission from John Murray III obtained through the good offices of his cousin Arthur Stanley and Albert Way, married to Emmeline Stanley. In 1871 Hare published Walks in Rome (2 vols.); it reached a 12th edition in 1887. In 1883, in the British Quarterly Review, it was said that "His 'Walks in Rome' remains one of the most successful books, as it well deserves to be." He went on to compile numerous guidebooks, a number of which were later revised by Welbore St Clair Baddeley (1856–1945).

The travel books were typically illustrated with woodcuts after Hare's sketches. Gavin Henderson wrote:

He is not remembered as a draughtsman, but these vignettes from his sketches form a most remarkable appendix to the great body of Victorian woodcuts.

That said, Hare's watercolours, "usually in a free and wet manner", were "often very competent".

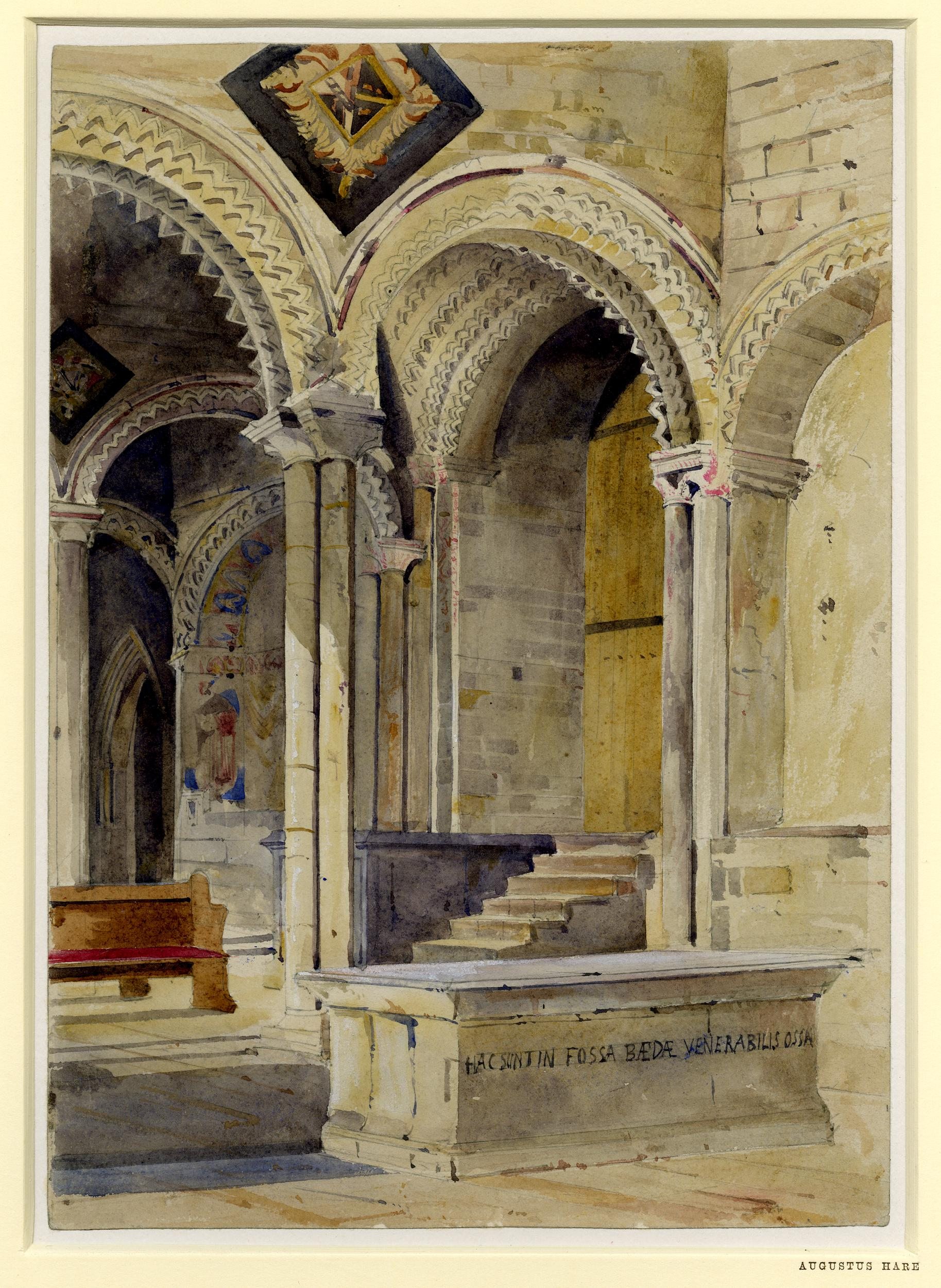
Bede's Tomb, Durham Cathedral, watercolour by Augustus Hare

Hare complained about the aridity of the abbreviated style required by Murray for the Handbook series, calling it both "hard, dry and incisive" and "unreadable". His own style was lighter, but much of his guidebook content was verbatim quotation from other authors. Edward Augustus Freeman thought Hare made unfair use of his articles in the Saturday Review for a book on Italy; and the John Murray publishing house took legal action against him for copying their northern Italy Handbook.

== Death and legacy ==
Hare died unmarried in 1903 and was buried at All Saints' Church, Herstmonceux. He left most of his estate to the family of Edward Penrhyn MP (died 1861, né Leycester), brother of Maria Hare, with use of his home Holmhurst St Mary for life to his daughter Emma Leycester Penrhyn (a cousin only in the adoptive sense). He had written in 1898 of Emmie Penrhyn as "one of the dearest relations I have left." She died in 1909.

Holmhurst was sold in the summer of 1908 to Sir John Gordon Kennedy. In the process, a legal case arose (Re Hare, Leycester-Penrhyn v Leycester-Penrhyn), concerning the interests of the "remaindermen"—Emma Leycester Penrhyn's brother Edward's unmarried daughters—under the will. In a report in the Law Journal, the summary ran "The testator devised his residuary real and personal estate (in the event of her surviving him, which event happened) to the plaintiff. The plaintiff proposed to sell, and had entered into a conditional contract for the sale of the premises at 'Holmhurst,' and took out the present summons, asking that the conditional contract might be carried into effect [...]", asking also about the handling of the proceeds. There followed a sale of furniture and pictures from the house by the local firm Dawson & Harden. In October of that year Hare's library and some pencil and watercolour sketches were sold at Hodgson & Co., auctioneers in Chancery Lane.

== In literature ==
Harper Lee references Hare and The Story of My Life in the short story The Land of Sweet Forever. She compares evangelical Victorians to Southern Methodists in her fictional town of Maycomb, based on her hometown of Monroeville, Alabama.

== List of works ==
Travel guides:

- A Handbook for Travellers in Berks, Bucks and Oxfordshire, (John Murray, 1860)
- A Winter at Mentone, (Wertheim, Macintosh & Hunt, 1862)
- A Handbook for Travellers in Northumberland and Durham, (John Murray, 1863)
- Walks in Rome, (Daldy, Isbister & Co., 1871) 2 vols.
- Wanderings in Spain, (Strahan & Co., 1873)
- Days Near Rome, (Daldy, Isbister & Co., 1875) 2 vols.
- Cities of Northern Italy, (Daldy, Isbister & Co., 1876) 2 vols.
- Walks in London, (Daldy, Isbister & Co., 1878)
- Cities of Southern Italy and Sicily, (Smith, Elder & Co., 1883)
- Cities of Central Italy, (Smith, Elder & Co., 1884) 2 vols.
- Florence, (Smith, Elder & Co., 1884)
- Venice, (Smith, Elder & Co., 1884)
- Sketches in Holland and Scandinavia, (George Allen, 1885)
- Studies in Russia, (Smith, Elder & Co., 1885)
- Paris, (Smith, Elder & Co., 1887) 2 vols.
- Days Near Paris, (Smith, Elder & Co., 1887)
- South-Eastern France, (George Allen & Unwin, 1890)
- South-Western France, (George Allen & Unwin, 1890)
- North-Eastern France, (George Allen & Unwin, 1890)
- Sussex, (1894)
- North-Western France (Normandy and Brittany), (George Allen, 1895)
- The Rivieras, (George Allen, 1897)
- Shropshire, (George Allen, 1898)
- Sicily, (William Heinemann, 1905) posthumous single volume edition, revised by St Clair Baddeley
- Cities of Southern Italy, (William Heinemann, 1911) posthumous single volume edition, revised by St Clair Baddeley

Autobiography:

- The Story of My Life, (George Allen, 1896–1900) 6 vols.

Biography:

- Memorials of a Quiet Life, (Strahan & Co., 1872–76) 3 vols.
- Life and Letters of Frances, Baroness Bunsen, (Daldy, Isbister & Co., 1879) 2 vols.
- The Story of Two Noble Lives: being Memorials of Charlotte, Countess Canning, and Louisa, Marchioness of Waterford, (George Allen, 1893) 3 vols.
- Life and Letters of Maria Edgeworth, (Edward Arnold, 1894) - as editor
- The Gurneys of Earlham, (George Allen, 1895) 2 vols.
- Biographical Sketches: being Memorials of Arthur Penrhyn Stanley, Dean of Westminster, Henry Alford, Dean of Canterbury, Mrs. Duncan Stewart etc., (George Allen, 1895)

Other:

- Epitaphs for Country Churchyards. Collected and Arranged, (John Henry & James Parker, 1856)
