= Augustus William Hare =

British writer (1792–1834)

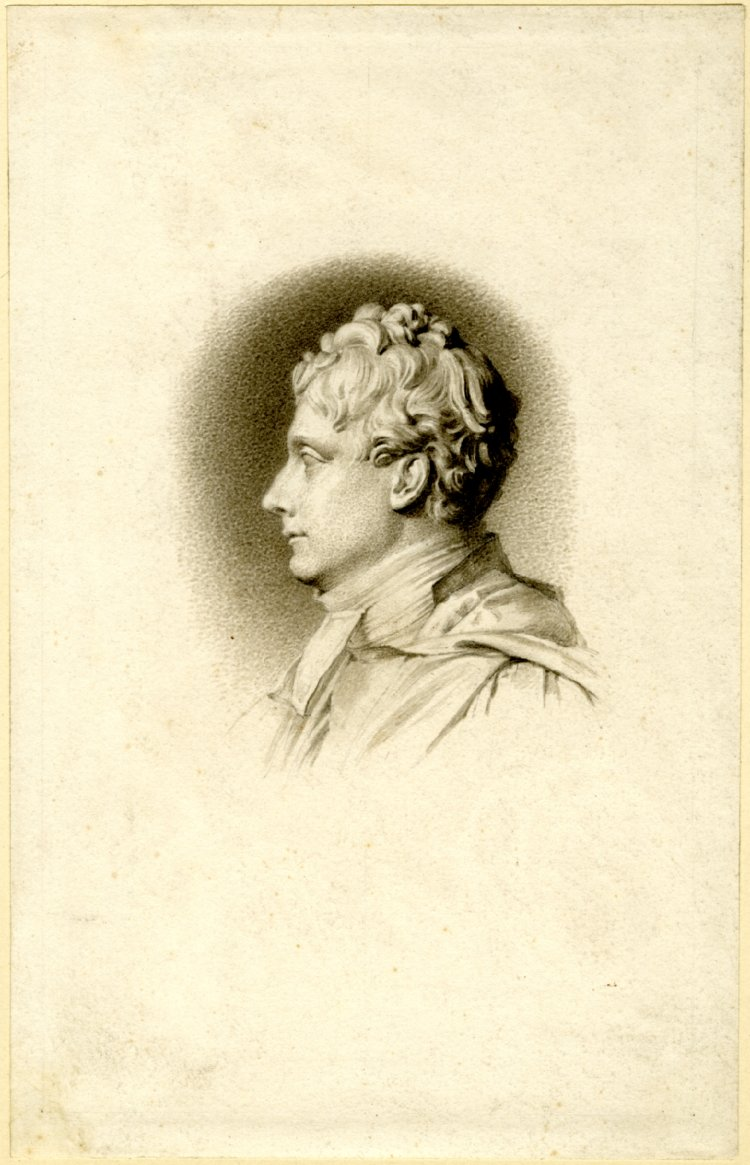
- Portrait of Rev. Augustus William Hare
- Born: 17 November 1792; Herstmonceux, Sussex, Kingdom of Great Britain
- Died: 22 January 1834 (aged 41); Rome, Papal States
- Resting place: Protestant Cemetery, Rome
- Education: New College, Oxford
- Spouse: Maria Leycester
- Parents: Francis Hare-Naylor (father); Georgiana Hare-Naylor (mother)
- Relatives: Augustus Hare (nephew)

Augustus William Hare (17 November 1792 – 22 January 1834) was a British writer who was the author of a history of Germany.

== Life ==
Hare was the son of Francis Hare-Naylor and his wife, the artist Georgiana, daughter of Jonathan Shipley, Bishop of Llandaff and Bishop of St Asaph.

His godmother was his mother's sister Anna Maria, widow of Sir William Jones. She enabled him to attend Winchester College, and New College, Oxford, in the latter of which he was for some time a tutor. Weak health prevented him especially distinguishing himself, but in 1810 he was elected to a vacancy at New College. With his school-friends he established one of the first Oxford debating clubs, The Attic Society, which supplied his chief interest at college.

Lady Jones wished him to qualify himself for the rich family living of Hurstmonceaux, Sussex, by taking orders, but he offended her by refusing. In the last years of his undergraduate life, he offended the college authorities by an attempt to extinguish the privileges of founder's kin at Winchester and New College, and he printed an attack, in the form of a letter to his friend George Martin, on the privilege which permitted New College men to graduate without public examinations. After a long absence in Italy, Hare returned to New College as a tutor in 1818. In June 1824 he published a defence of the Gospel narrative of the Resurrection, entitled A Layman's Letters to the Authors of the "Trial of the Witnesses". In 1825, he was ordained in Winchester College Chapel. With his brother Julius, Hare wrote Guesses at Truth, an "influential miscellany" of essays.

On 2 June 1829, having been recently appointed to the small college living of Alton Barnes in Wiltshire, Hare married Maria Leycester, daughter of the rector of Stoke-on-Terne, Shropshire. Entering the Church, he became incumbent of the rural parish of Alton Barnes during the last three years of this life. While there, he wrote at least two volumes of sermons, which were published posthumously by his brother Julius.

His failing health obliged them to go for the winter to Italy, where he died at Rome, 18 February 1834. The same year, his nephew and namesake, Augustus Hare, was born. He was buried at the foot of the pyramid of Caius Cestius, in the old Protestant cemetery. His widow, who survived till 13 November 1870, went to live in the parish of her brother-in-law Julius, and is buried in Hurstmonceaux churchyard.

== Bibliography ==
- Guesses at Truth at the Internet Archive
- The Alton Sermons at the Internet Archive
- A Letter to Daniel K. Sandford at the Internet Archive
- Sermons on the Lord's Prayer at the Internet Archive
- Sermons to a Country Congregation at the Internet Archive

== Sources ==
- This article incorporates text from a publication now in the public domain: Hare, Augustus John Cuthbert (1890). "Hare, Augustus William". In Stephen, Leslie; Lee, Sidney (eds.). Dictionary of National Biography. Vol. 24. London: Smith, Elder & Co.
- Hardwick, Lorna; Stray, Christopher (2011), A Companion to Classical Receptions, Wiley & Sons, ISBN 978-1-4443-9377-4
- Kozicki, Henry (Spring 1975), "Philosophy of History in Tennyson's Poetry to the 1842 Poems", ELH, 42 (1): 88–106, doi:10.2307/2872539, JSTOR 2872539
- Omond, Thomas Stewart (1900), The Romantic Triumph, Ayer Publishing – via Internet Archive
- Watkinson, William Lonsdale; Davison, William Theophilus, eds. (April 1873), "Sermons to a Country Congregation", Literary Notices, The London Quarterly Review, 40 (79)
