= Julius Hare (theologian) =

English theological writer (1795–1855)

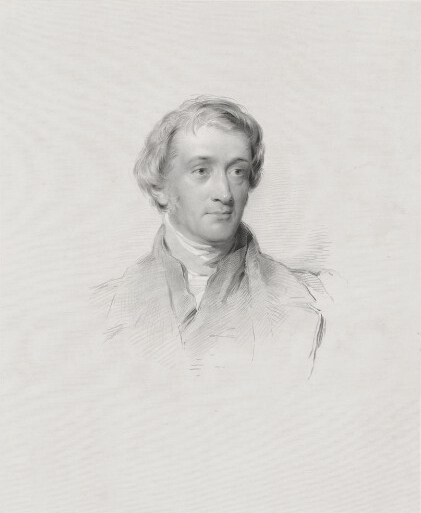
Julius C. Hare, 1852 engraving

Julius Charles Hare (13 September 1795 – 3 January 1855) was an English theological writer.

== Early life ==
He was born at Valdagno, near Vicenza, in Italy. His parents were Francis Hare-Naylor and the painter Georgiana Shipley, a daughter of Bishop Shipley. Augustus William Hare was his brother, and his great-grandfather, Francis Hare, was bishop of St Asaph.

He came to England with his parents in 1799, but in 1804/05 spent a winter with them at Weimar, Germany, where he met Goethe and Schiller, and took an interest in German literature which influenced his style and sentiments throughout his career. On the death of his mother in 1806, Julius was sent to Tonbridge School, where he remained until 1812, when he entered Trinity College, Cambridge. There he became fellow in 1818, and after another trip abroad he began to read law in London in the following year. From 1822 to 1832 he was assistant tutor at Trinity College.

== Career ==
Turning from law to divinity, Hare took holy orders in 1826; and, on the death of his uncle in 1832, he succeeded to the rich family living of Herstmonceux in Sussex, where he accumulated a library of some 12,000 volumes, especially rich in German literature. Before taking up residence in his parish at Herstmonceux rectory, he went abroad again, and in Rome he met Chevalier Bunsen, who afterwards dedicated to him part of his work, Hippolytus and his Age. In 1840 Hare was appointed archdeacon of Lewes, and in the same year preached a series of sermons at Cambridge (The Victory of Faith), followed in 1846 by a second, The Mission of the Comforter. The published versions did not achieve much popularity. In 1844, Hare married Esther, a sister of his friend Frederick Maurice.

Hare was a member of the Canterbury Association from March 1848. In 1851 he was collated to a prebend in Chichester; and in 1853 he became one of Queen Victoria's chaplains.

== Views and works ==
Julius Hare belonged to what has been called the "Broad Church party," though some of his opinions approach those of the Evangelical Arminian school, while others seem vague and undecided. He was one of the first Britons to recognize and be influenced by German thought and speculation, and, amidst an exaggerated alarm of German heresy, helped vindicate the authority of the sounder German critics. His writings, which are chiefly theological and controversial, consist mainly of sermons on different topics; though valuable and full of thought, they lose some of their force by the cumbersome German structure of the sentences.

In 1827 Guesses at Truth by Two Brothers was published with his brother. The work, initially published anonymously, consisted of essays, aphorisms, and literary studies. A revised edition appeared in 1838 dedicated to William Wordsworth, who began to read it "with great pleasure and profit." Hare assisted Connop Thirlwall, afterwards Bishop of St David's, in translating the first and second volumes of Niebuhr's History of Rome (1828 and 1832), and published a Vindication of Niebuhr's History in 1829. He wrote many similar works, among which is a Vindication of Luther against his recent English Assailants (1854). In 1848 he edited the Remains of John Sterling, who had formerly been his curate. Thomas Carlyle's Life of John Sterling (1851) was written out of dissatisfaction at the overemphasis on doctrinal questions in the biography of Sterling that Hare wrote for his 1848 volume, and, especially, at the obsession with theological matters by contemporary "Religious Newspapers, and Periodical Heresy-hunters" that discussed Hare's book. Memorials of a Quiet Life, published in 1872 by Augustus Hare, contain accounts of the Hare family.

Hare also translated a number of tales by Ludwig Tieck.
