= Francis Hare (bishop) =

English churchman and classical scholar

Francis Hare (1671–1740) was an English churchman and classical scholar, bishop of St Asaph from 1727 and bishop of Chichester from 1731.

== Life ==
Born on 1 November 1671, he was son of Richard Hare of Leigh, Essex. His mother, his father's second wife, was Sarah, daughter of Thomas Naylor. He was educated at Eton College, and admitted in 1688 to King's College, Cambridge. He graduated B.A. in 1692, M.A. in 1696, and D.D. in 1708. At Cambridge he was tutor of Robert Walpole and the Marquis of Blandford, son of John Churchill, 1st Duke of Marlborough, who died in his college on 20 February 1703.

In 1704 Hare was appointed chaplain-general to the army in Flanders. He described the campaign of 1704 in a series of letters to his cousin, George Naylor of Herstmonceux Castle, and in a journal preserved by William Coxe. In 1710 he again joined the camp at Douai. Hare received a royal chaplaincy under Queen Anne, and he was elected fellow of Eton in October 1712. He was rector of Barnes, Surrey, 1717 to 1727, and held a prebend in St Paul's Cathedral from 1707 till his death. In 1715 he was appointed dean of Worcester, and in 1722 Henry Pelham, younger brother of his sister-in-law, Lady Grace Naylor, being two of the children of Thomas Pelham, 1st Baron Pelham, made him usher to the exchequer. In October 1726 he exchanged Worcester for the deanery of St Paul's, which he held till his death, and on 19 December 1727 was consecrated bishop of St Asaph. He had been dismissed from his chaplaincy about 1718, in consequence of his share in the Bangorian controversy, when he joined the assailants of Bishop Benjamin Hoadly.

On the accession of George II, he was in favour with Queen Caroline. She intended him for the see of Bath and Wells, but the ministry was against giving the best preferments to newly consecrated bishops. Hare's fame as a preacher at this time is shown by a complimentary allusion in the Dunciad.

In 1731 Hare was translated from the see of St Asaph to that of Chichester. In 1736 Sir Robert Walpole, godfather of his son Robert, proposed him as successor to Archbishop William Wake, then rapidly failing. But Hare had recently opposed the government in some measures for the relief of dissenters; and John Hervey, 2nd Baron Hervey, who had encountered him on that occasion, lobbied successfully against the appointment, pointing out truly that the sharp-tongued and isolated Hare was unpopular.

On 26 April 1740 Hare died at the Vache, and was buried in a mausoleum which he had built for his family adjoining the nearby church of Chalfont St Giles.

== Works ==
Hare was a prolific author.

=== Feud with Bentley ===
He had been an old friend of Richard Bentley, to whom he addressed in 1713 The clergyman's thanks to Phileleutherus (Bentley's pseudonym in the controversy with Anthony Collins). They were estranged in part by Hare's support of John Colbatch. In 1724 Hare published an edition of Terence based upon that of Faërnius (Gabriel Faerne), and with notes founded partly on previous communications from Bentley, who had intended to publish an edition himself. The vexed Bentley published his own edition with notes, bitterly attacking Hare, and soon after issued an edition of Phaedrus, in order to anticipate a proposed edition by Hare. Hare retaliated in an Epistola Critica in 1727, addressed to Henry Bland, head-master of Eton, claiming many errors in his rival's edition. Hare's Latin scholarship was praised by Samuel Parr and by James Henry Monk.

=== Psalms ===
In 1736 Hare published an edition of the Psalms in Hebrew. Dr. Richard Grey, in the preface to his Hebrew Grammar declared that it restored the text in several places to its original beauty. But Hare's theory of Hebrew versification was confuted by Robert Lowth in 1766, and feebly defended by Thomas Edwards.

=== Controversies ===
Hare was involved in various controversies. He defended Marlborough and the War of the Spanish Succession in pamphlets, publishing

- in 1711 The Allies and the Late Ministry defended against France in 4 parts, a rejoinder to Jonathan Swift's Conduct of the Allies;
- Management of the War 1711;
- Conduct of the Duke of Marlborough during the present War 1712;
- and other tracts in defence of the negotiations of 1719 and the Barrier treaty.

A thanksgiving sermon on the taking of Bouchain (preached by Hare 9 September 1711) was ridiculed by Swift in A Learned Comment.

A sermon on King Charles's martyrdom (preached 1731) produced six pamphlets in its defence. A tract published in 1714, entitled Difficulties and Discouragements which attend the Study of the Scriptures in the way of Private Judgement was censured by convocation. It was taken to be ironical; but it is not very clear whether or not he meant to defend Samuel Clarke and William Whiston. It was often reprinted.

Hare contributed to the Bangorian controversy Church Authority Vindicated in 1719 (a sermon which went through five editions), and was answered by Hoadly. Hare retorted in Scripture vindicated from the misrepresentations of the Bishop of Bangor 1721, and an ironical 'new defence' of the bishop's sermon. These are all collected in his works in four volumes (1746 and 1755), where the complimentary letter of 1713 to Bentley is omitted as inconsistent with the later attack on his Phaedrus.

=== Patronage ===
Among other learned men, Hare was the patron of Jeremiah Markland, who dedicated his edition of Statius to him. He also made efforts to advance the career of William Warburton.

== Family ==
In the autumn of 1709 he married his first cousin, Bethaia Naylor, who became the heiress of Herstmonceux on the death of her brother's only daughter, Grace. While visiting his paternal estates near Faversham, Hare became acquainted with Joseph Alston of Edwardstone, Suffolk, whose eldest daughter, Mary Margaret, became his second wife in April 1728, and brought him a large fortune in the estates of Newhouse, Suffolk, the ancient manor of Hos-Tendis, near Skulthorpe in Norfolk, and The Vache, an estate near Chalfont St Giles in Buckinghamshire. At the Vache they always resided during the latter years of his life, and there the seven children of his second marriage were born.

The estates of Hurstmonceux came to his first son Francis, by Bethaia, who took the name of Hare-Naylor. Hare brought up his son strictly, obliging him to speak Greek in the family. Francis gave the bishop trouble by a wild life, and then by engaging himself to his stepmother's sister, Carlotta Alston. The bishop prevented this marriage in his lifetime, but it took place after his death. Another son, Robert, was father of Francis Hare-Naylor.

== Notes ==
Church of England titles
| Preceded by William Talbot | Dean of Worcester; 1715–1726 | Succeeded by James Stillingfleet |
| Preceded by Henry Godolphin | Dean of St Paul's; 1726–1740 | Succeeded by Joseph Butler |
| Preceded by John Wynne | Bishop of St Asaph; 1727–1731 | Succeeded by Thomas Tanner |
| Preceded by Edward Waddington | Bishop of Chichester; 1731–1740 | Succeeded by Matthias Mawson |
