= Giuseppe Gasparo Mezzofanti =

Italian cardinal and hyper polyglot (1774–1849)

His Eminence Giuseppe Gasparo Mezzofanti
- Prefect of the Congregation for Studies
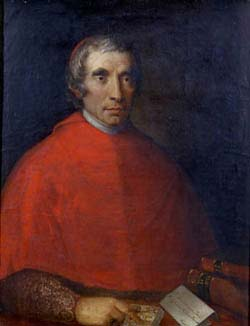
- Church: Roman Catholic Church
- Appointed: 23 May 1845
- Term ended: 15 March 1849
- Predecessor: Luigi Lambruschini
- Successor: Carlo Vizzardelli
- Other post: Cardinal-Priest of Sant'Onofrio (1838-49)

Orders
- Ordination: 23 September 1797
- Created cardinal: 12 February 1838 by Pope Gregory XVI
- Rank: Cardinal-Priest

Personal details
- Born: Giuseppe Gasparo Mezzofanti; 19 September 1774 Bologna, Papal States
- Died: 15 March 1849 (aged 74) Rome, Papal States
- Buried: Sant'Onofrio
- Parents: Francesco Mezzofanti; Gesualda Dall'Olmo

Giuseppe Gasparo Mezzofanti (19 September 1774 – 15 March 1849) was an Italian cardinal known for being a hyperpolyglot. He spoke 38 to 50 languages.

== Life ==
Born in Bologna, he showed exceptional mnemonic, musical, and language learning skills from a young age. He studied with the Piarists, where he met several missionaries from various countries. By speaking with them he began learning several new languages including Swedish, German, Spanish, and languages of Indigenous peoples of South America, as well as studying Latin and Ancient Greek in school. He completed his theological studies before he had reached the minimum age for ordination as a priest. In 1797 he was ordained and became professor of Arabic, Hebrew, languages of Asia, and Greek at the University of Bologna. The same year, Mezzofanti tutored the eldest son of Georgiana Hare-Naylor.

Mezzofanti lost his university position for refusing to take the oath of allegiance required by the Cisalpine Republic, which governed Bologna at the time. Between 1799 and 1800 he visited many foreign people who had been wounded during the Napoleonic Wars to attend to them and started to learn other European languages.

In 1803, he was appointed assistant librarian of the Institute of Bologna, and soon afterwards was reinstated as professor of Oriental languages and Ancient Greek. The chair of Oriental languages was suppressed by the viceroy Eugène de Beauharnais in 1808, but again rehabilitated on the restoration of Pope Pius VII in 1814. Mezzofanti held this post until he went to Rome in 1831 as a member of the Congregation for the Evangelization of Peoples (Congregatio de Propaganda Fide), the Catholic Church's governing body for missionary activities.

In 1833, he succeeded Angelo Mai as Custodian-in-Chief of the Vatican Library, and in 1838 was made cardinal of Sant'Onofrio and director of studies in the Congregation for the Evangelization of Peoples. His other interests included ethnology, archaeology, numismatics, and astronomy.

== Polyglossia ==
Various anecdotal reports claim that Mezzofanti knew, to varying degrees, dozens of languages. The precise number of languages known to Mezzofanti is uncertain, as is the degree and extent of his abilities in them. Mezzofanti's nephew gave a list of 114 languages. The 1858 biography of Mezzofanti written by Catholic clergyman Charles Russell gives a list of seventy-two languages, ordered into four categories by degree of proficiency; of these, thirty languages (Note: Biblical Hebrew, Mishnaic Hebrew, Arabic, Chaldee, Coptic, Ancient Armenian, Modern Armenian, Persian, Turkish, Albanian, Maltese, Greek, "Romaic", Latin, Italian, Spanish, Portuguese, French, German, Swedish, Danish, Dutch, Flemish, English, "Illyrian" (both "the Slavonic and the Romanic", likely referring to Croatian and Dalmatian), Russian, Polish, Czech, Hungarian, and Chinese.) are claimed to have been "frequently tested, and spoken with rare excellence", while another nine (Note: Syriac, Ge'ez, Amharic, Hindustani, Gujarati, Basque, Romanian, "Californian" (one or perhaps more of the indigenous languages of California), and Algonquin.) were claimed to have been "spoken fluently, but hardly sufficiently tested". A further eleven (Note: Kurdish, Georgian, Serbian, Bulgarian, Romani, "Peguan", Welsh, "Angolese" (likely Kimbundu), "Mexican", "Chilian", and "Peruvian".) were categorized as "spoken rarely, and less perfectly", eight (Note: Sinhala, Burmese, Japanese, Irish, Scottish Gaelic, Chippewa, Delaware, and "some of the languages of Oceanica" (likely including Māori, and perhaps others).) as "spoken imperfectly ;— a few sentences and conversational forms" and a final fourteen (Note: Sanskrit, Malay, "Tonkinese" (probably Vietnamese, in particular the northern dialects of what was then called Tonkin), "Cochin-Chinese" (probably also referring to Vietnamese, in particular the southern dialects of Cochinchina), Tibetan, Japanese (listed twice; see previous category), Icelandic, "Lappish", Ruthenian, Frisian, "Lettish", Cornish, classical Quechua, and "Bimbarra" (possibly Bambara).) as "studied from books, but not known to have been spoken".

However, scholars have cast doubt on the veracity of such reports. Even in Russell's own time, his estimation of Mezzofanti's abilities were criticized as exaggerations by fellow polyglot Thomas Watts, who estimated the number of languages Mezzofanti knew to about 60 or 61, a figure Russell later ended up agreeing with if one discounts languages in which the cardinal had only a very basic knowledge and some vocabulary. It has been suggested that some reports of Mezzofanti's abilities may have had a hagiographical character, comparable to claims that certain Catholic saints could perform miracles such as levitation or bilocation. Additionally, the particular figure of "seventy-two languages" that Russell gives has religious significance, as the purported number of languages that resulted from the fall of the Tower of Babel, and thus may have been artificially selected for that reason. Linguists have also pointed out that lay people (i.e. non-linguists) frequently misunderstand what true language proficiency entails, or underestimate the difficulty in acquiring and maintaining it, and thus caution against reading contemporary accounts of Mezzofanti's abilities uncritically. Furthermore, in Mezzofanti's era, an individual's proficiency in a language would likely have been gauged largely on the basis of their capacity for the receptive or passive skills of reading and translation, rather than by the more exacting standard of oral proficiency that is typically expected today. Additionally, Mezzofanti's duties as a cardinal who engaged with foreign dignitaries would have largely involved the use of a small set of canned phrases, the use of which do not necessarily indicate actual linguistic fluency.

The surviving papers from Mezzofanti's collection of documents have been found to contain texts about or in at least 56 languages, variously in Mezzofanti's hand or written by others, which Mezzofanti had presumably collected for learning purposes. Such documents include word lists, parallel texts, and linguistic descriptions (e.g. grammar). These records suggest that Mezzofanti had at least some knowledge of dozens of languages, though the exact degree and extent of his abilities cannot be known.

Mezzofanti himself was known to respond modestly when asked about his linguistic abilities, humbly saying, "What am I but an ill-bound dictionary?"

== See also ==
- List of polyglots
