= Georgiana Hare-Naylor =

English painter

Georgiana Shipley
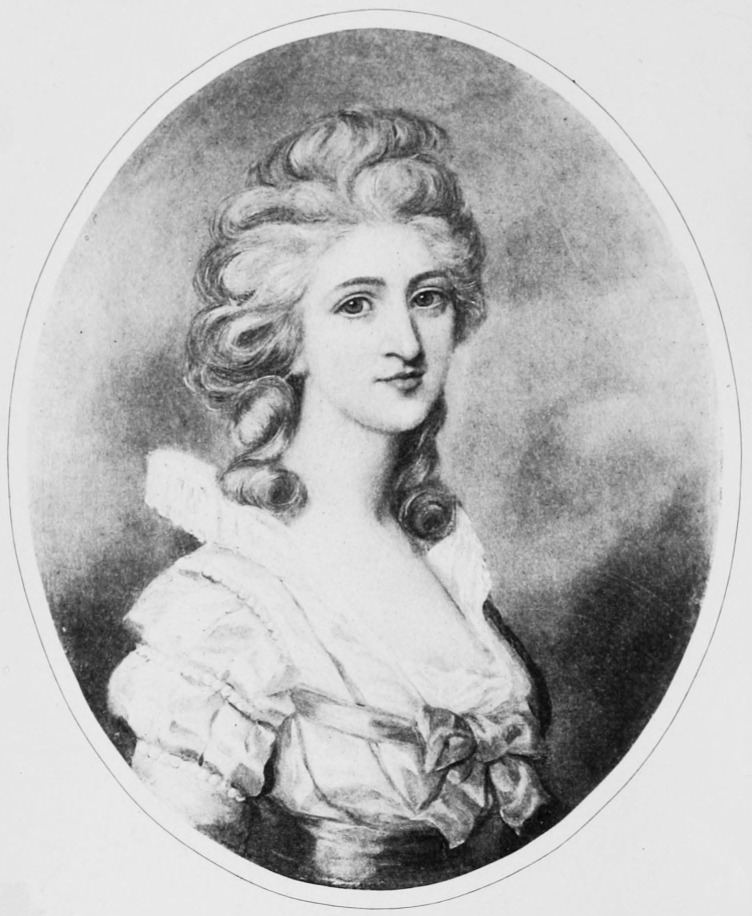
- Born: Georgiana Mordaunt Shipley; 1755
- Died: 1806 (aged 50–51); Lausanne
- Other name: Georgiana Hare-Naylor
- Known for: painting and art patron
- Spouse: Francis Hare-Naylor
- Children: 4, including Augustus William Hare & Julius Charles Hare
- Father: Jonathan Shipley

Georgiana Hare-Naylor (born Georgiana Shipley; circa 1755–1806) was an English painter and art patron.

== Life ==
Georgiana was born at St Asaph in 1752, the fourth daughter of Anna Maria, born Mordaunt, and Jonathan Shipley, then a canon of Christ Church, Oxford and later Bishop of Llandaff and of St Asaph. Her eldest sister Anna Maria married Sir William Jones, who proposed the existence of the Indo-European language. Georgiana was a scholar, excellent at Latin. She learned painting in Joshua Reynolds's studio and in 1781 exhibited at the Royal Academy in London.

She was a few years older than her cousin and namesake Georgiana Spencer, later Georgiana Cavendish, Duchess of Devonshire. The duchess introduced her to Francis Hare-Naylor, whom her father reluctantly invited to Twyford House. The following day the young man was arrested for debt while driving in the Bishop's coach with Georgiana and her parents.

The duchess settled an annuity of £200 on the young couple and with that they married, travelling first to Karlsruhe, and then to the north of Italy. Georgiana devoted herself to painting and they settled in Bologna, where she formed a friendship with Clotilda Tambroni, Professor of Ancient Greek at the university there. Georgiana was said to be fluent in Greek, which she taught her children.

In 1792 she commissioned the artist and sculptor John Flaxman to create illustrations for Homer's books The Iliad and The Odyssey. Flaxman's sister was the artist Maria Flaxman, governess to the Hare-Naylor children.

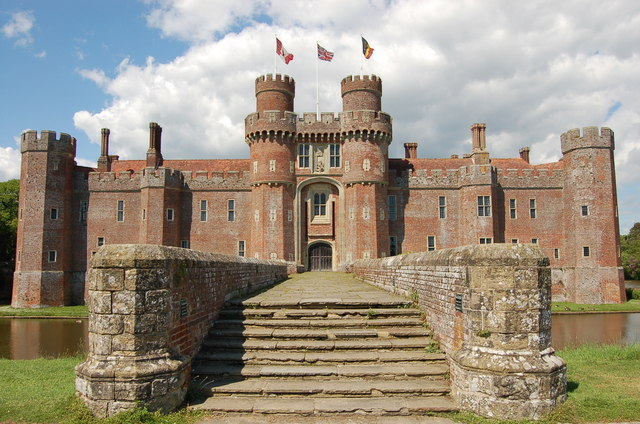
Herstmonceux Castle

In 1797 her father-in-law died and the Hare-Naylors set off for England, leaving three of their children in the care of Professor Tambroni and Father Emmanuele Aponte, a Spanish Jesuit priest. They appointed Giuseppe Caspar Mezzofanti as tutor to their eldest son. This was thought an odd decision but Georgiana took her own counsel and her eldest attributed his love of learning to the time he spent with these scholars.

The Hare-Naylors settled at Herstmonceux Castle. Her husband's principles made enemies, and he rejected a baronetcy. From 1799, when the Hare-Naylors sent for their children, life became a financial struggle, requiring support from the now-widowed Lady Jones.

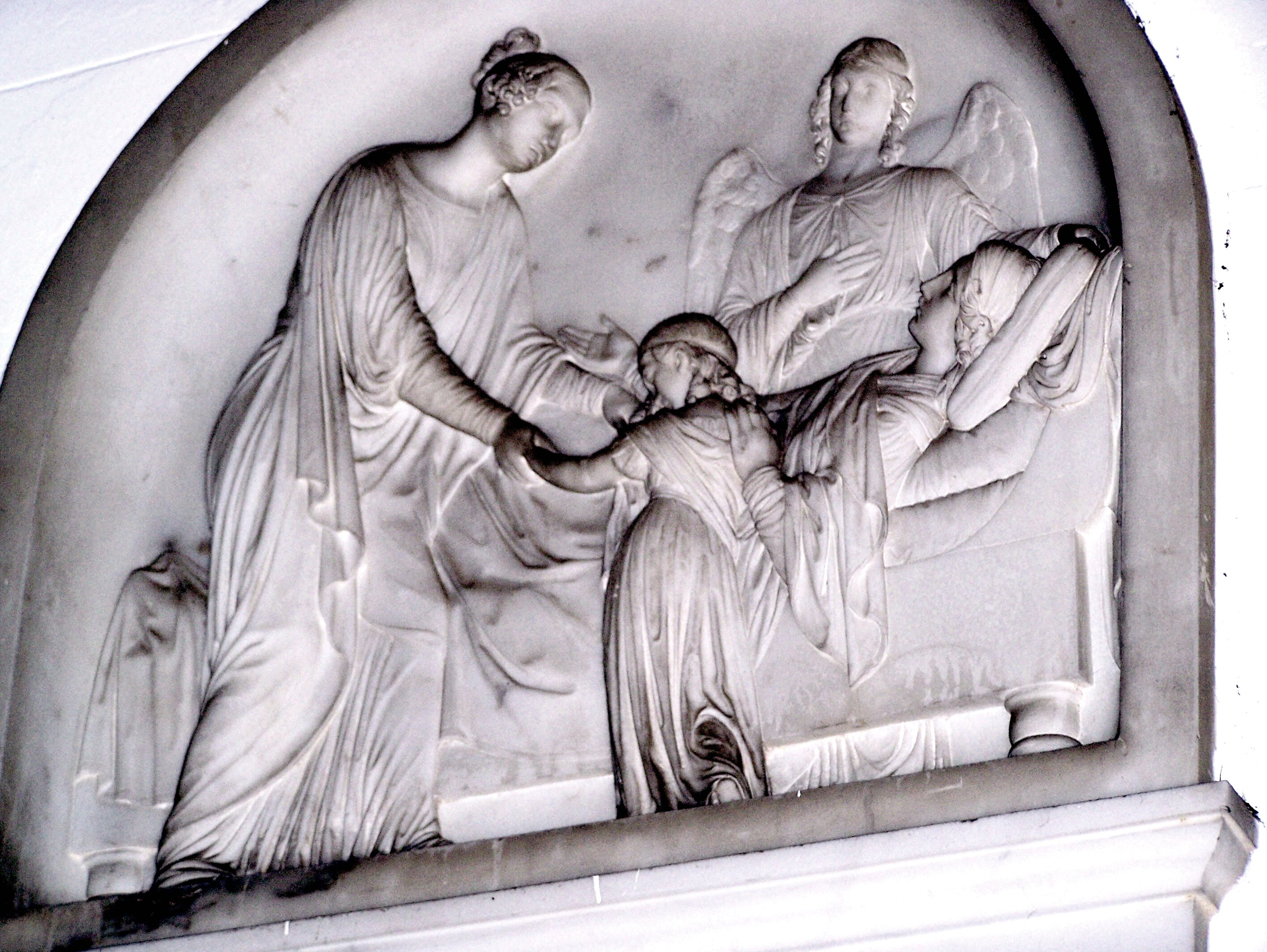
A memorial to her at All Saints Church, Herstmonceux, Sussex

In 1803 Georgiana Hare-Naylor began a large series of pictures representing the Castle as it had appeared before the demolitions. She finished her work, but then lost her sight. In the following year the Hare-Naylors went to reside at Weimar, where the reigning duchess was on good terms with the family. Georgiana was able to enjoy the company of leading scholars including Schiller and Goethe, but her health was failing.

On Easter Sunday, 1806, Georgiana Hare-Naylor died at Lausanne, leaving her children to the care of Lady Jones, her eldest sister. Her husband never returned to Herstmonceux, and in 1807 he sold the estate.

There is a poignant memorial to her at Herstmonceux which shows her on her death bed entrusting her only daughter, Anna Maria Clemintina, then about seven years old, to her sister. The work is credited to "a Danish artist, pupil of Thorwaldsen" (presumably Bertel Thorvaldsen, mainly known as a sculptor).

== Family ==
Her four sons were Francis, Augustus, Julius, and Marcus, all born in Italy. Her only daughter, Anna Maria Clementina, was named after her elder sister.
