= Thomas Edwards (divine) =

Anglican clergyman and divine

Thomas Edwards (1729–1785) was an Anglican clergyman and divine.

== Life ==
Edwards was born at Coventry in August 1729, the son of Thomas Edwards, and educated at the Free Grammar School, King Henry VIII's, there. In 1746 he entered St John's College, Cambridge, but migrated the following year to Clare Hall, graduating B.A. in 1750 and M.A. in 1754, and becoming a fellow of Clare. He was ordained deacon 1751, and priest 1753, by Frederick Cornwallis, bishop of Lichfield and Coventry. In 1755 he published A New English Translation of the Psalms, &c., and in 1758 a sermon preached at St. Michaels. In 1758 he became master of the free grammar school and rector of St. John the Baptist, Coventry. In this year he married Ann Barrott.

In 1759 Edwards, published The Doctrine of Irresistible Grace proved to have no foundation in the Writings of the N. T., a book of some importance in the Calvinist and Arminian controversy, and in 1762 Prolegomena in Libros Veteris Testamenti Poeticos, to which he added an attack upon Robert Lowth's Metricæ Harianæ brevis Confutatio, which led to a controversy of some length.

In 1766 he proceeded D.D., and in 1770 was presented to Nuneaton in Warwickshire, where he passed the rest of his life, having severed his connection with Coventry in 1779. He lost his wife in 1784, and dying in June 1785 was buried at Foleshill.

He was of a mild and benevolent temper, and fond of retirement. His chief friend was Edmund Law, bishop of Carlisle.

== Theology ==
From a theological perspective, Edwards was an Arminian divine.

== Works ==
- The Doctrine of Irresistible Grace proved to have no foundation in the Writings of the N. T., 1759
- Prolegomena in Libros Veteris Testamenti Poeticos, 1762
- Epistola ad doctissimum R. Lowthium, 1765.
- Two Dissertationes, 1767.
- Due Dissertationes, 1768.
- The Indispensable Duty of Contending for the Faith, 1773.
- Selecta quædam Theocriti Idyllia (350 lines of Theocritus, 250 pages of notes, and 20 pages of addenda, &c.)
