= Modern English Biography =

Modern English Biography is a biographical dictionary written by Frederic Boase and published in six volumes from 1892 to 1921.

== Volume 1 ==
This volume includes almost eight thousand biographies of people, who had died since 1850, whose names begin with the letters A to H. The Athenaeum said that Boase had "issued the first volume . . . of a highly valuable compilation . . . for which every journalist will thank him. It contains a large number of memoirs constructed on the right principle for such a work-that of giving the bare facts and no opinions. The conciseness of these memoirs is not their least valuable quality, and their accuracy is great." The Publishers' Circular said the volume "so far as we have been able to test it, is exceedingly full and reliable". The Academy said that the book would be "invaluable to all those who are curious to obtain accurate details about the minor celebrities of the past generation". This volume was reviewed also by Notes and Queries and Polybiblion.

== Volume 2 ==
This volume was published in 1897. It includes biographies of people, who had died since 1850, whose names begin with the letters I to Q. This volume was reviewed by The Athenaeum, The Bookseller and The Publishers' Circular.

== Volume 3 ==
This volume was reviewed by The Athenaeum.

== Volume 4 ==
This volume was reviewed by The Athenaeum.

== Volume 5 ==
This volume was reviewed by The Athenaeum and Notes and Queries.

== Volume 6 ==
This volume was reviewed by The Nation & the Athenaeum and Notes and Queries.

== 1965 reprint ==
The work was reprinted by Frank Cass & Co Ltd in 1965. This reprint was reviewed by Choice and the Times Literary Supplement.
