= Maria Flaxman =

British artist (1768–1833)

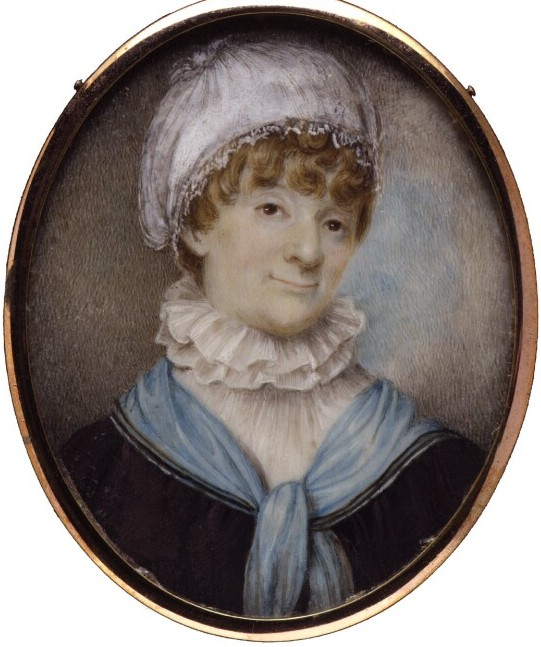
- Born: 1768
- Died: 17 April 1833 (aged 64–65); London

Maria Flaxman (1768 – 17 April 1833) was a British painter and illustrator.

== Life ==
Maria, also noted as Mary Ann or Maria T Flaxman, was the half-sister of the sculptor John Flaxman. She was influenced by his work and assisted him in the last years of his life. Maria Flaxman was employed as a governess to the Hare-Naylor family while they were living in Italy and at Weimar. In 1810 she moved to John Flaxman's house at Buckingham Street, just off The Strand in Central London, residing there until his death.

She is best known for six designs engraved by William Blake, illustrations published in the 1803 edition of William Hayley's Triumphs of Temper. Her works were contributed to the Royal Academy between 1780 and 1819, primarily designs for illustration of poetry and romance.

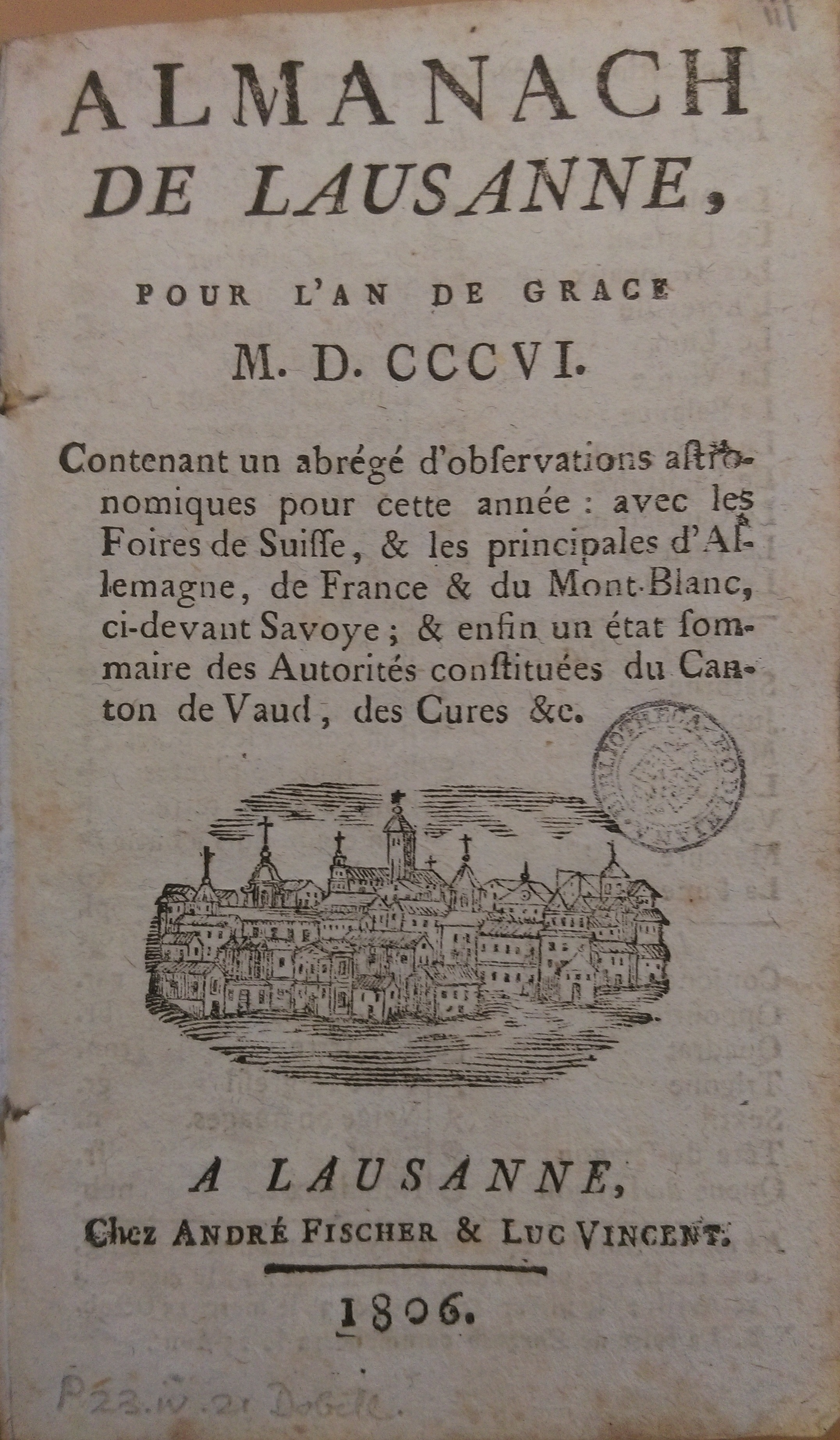
Almanac of Lausanne (1806) recently attributed to Maria Flaxman

In his Life of Blake, Alexander Gilchrist describes the work for Hayley's poem, finally issued in 1807,

"These amateur designs, aiming at an idealized domesticity, are expressive and beautiful in the Flaxman-Stothard manner; abound in grace of line, elegance of composition, and other artist-like virtues of a now obsolete sort."

There is a self portrait on ivory in the National Portrait Gallery, London and a diary from 1806 in the Bodleian Library.
