= Clotilde Tambroni =

Italian linguist

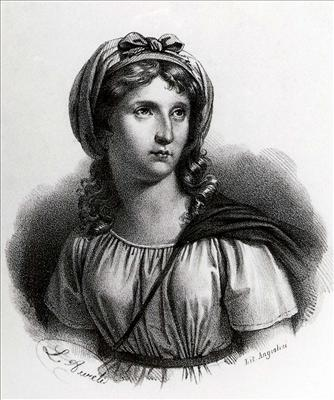
- Born: 29 June 1758; Bologna
- Died: 2 June 1817 (aged 58); Bologna
- Occupation: Classicist

Academic work
- Discipline: Classics
- Sub-discipline: Philology, Linguistics
- Institutions: University of Bologna

Clotilde Tambroni (29 June 1758 – 2 June 1817) was an Italian philologist, linguist and poet. She was a professor in the Greek language at the University of Bologna in 1793–1798, and a professor in Greek and literature in 1800–1808. She succeeded in achieving institutional recognition by a university long before women in many parts of the world could even attend university. As well as her native Italian, she was also fluent in French, English and Spanish.

== Career ==
In 1790, Clothilde Tambroni was invited into the Accademia degli Inestricati, and then in 1792 also admitted to the Accademia degli Arcadi, under the pseudonym of Doriclea Sicionia. Despite having had no opportunity to obtain an academic degree, on 23 November 1793 she was assigned the Chair of Greek Language. In 1797 her friend Georgiana Hare-Naylor had to return to England as her father in law had died. Georgiana entrusted her children to Tambroni and Father Emmanuele Aponte.

In 1798, after having lost her position for refusing to swear her loyalty to the new Cisalpine government, she worked in Spain as a researcher alongside her father, Emanuele Aponte, and was accepted into the l’Accademia Reale di Madrid.

Notwithstanding her political ideas, in September 1799 she was restored to the Accademia degli Inestricati as Chair of Greek Language and Literature, and in 1804 was granted a large pay rise.

She retired early, citing reasons of ill-health although the Greek Chair was to be abolished under the Napoleonic reforms, which privileged the teaching of science to the detriment of literary studies, although Tambroni herself said at her inaugural speech on 11 January 1806, science and literature had always been linked and notable scientists and humanists both produced by the Bolognese institution.

Adamo Tadolini sculpted her marble bust, supervised by Canova who was a friend of the Tambroni family. She received a lengthy dedication by Ireneo Affò, in his volume Ragionamento Del Padre.

== Major works ==
- Per le faustissime nozze del nobil uomo il signor conte Niccolo Fava Ghisilieri colla nobil donna la signora Gaetana Marescotti Berselli. Versi, co' tipi Bodoniani, Parma 1792.
- Pel felice parto della nobil donna signora contessa Susanna Jenisson Walworth Spencer. Ode greco-italiana, Stamp. S. Tommaso d'Aquino, Bologna 1792.
- Per la ricuperata salute dell'em.mo e rev.mo signor cardinale d. Andrea Gioannetti degnissimo arcivescovo di Bologna. Ode pindarica, stamp. S. Tommaso d'Aquino, Bologna 1793.
- Al nobile ed eccelso signor conte senatore Ferdinando Marescalchi Fava pel quinto solenne suo ingresso al gonfalonierato di giustizia della città e popolo di Bologna. Ode saffica greca, co' tipi Bodoniani, Parma 1794.
- In onore del celebre tipografo Giambattista Bodoni. Elegia greca, Tip. Reale Bodoni, Parma 1795.
- In lode del feld-maresciallo conte di Clairfait. Ode, Stamp. S. Tommaso d'Aquino, Bologna 1796.

== Published volumes of her letters ==
- Lettere inedite di Clotilde Tambroni, a cura di M.F. Sacchi, Tip. Agnelli, Milano 1804.
- Alcune lettere della celebre grecista Clotilde Tambroni, a cura di F. Raffaello, Tip. Corradetti, San Severino Marche 1870.
- Lettere di quattro gentildonne bolognesi, a cura di S. Battistini e C. Ricci, Tip. Monti, Bologna 1883.
