= Founders' kin =

Founders' kin was a hereditary privilege at certain colleges of the University of Oxford and the University of Cambridge whereby preference was given to applicants who were kin of, that is, related to or descended from, the founder or founders of that college. It also existed at Winchester College, the feeder school for New College.

Most founders' kin privileges were removed subsequent to the 1850 Royal Commission into the governance of the university.
