= The Cambridge Modern History =

Book by Arthur John Butler

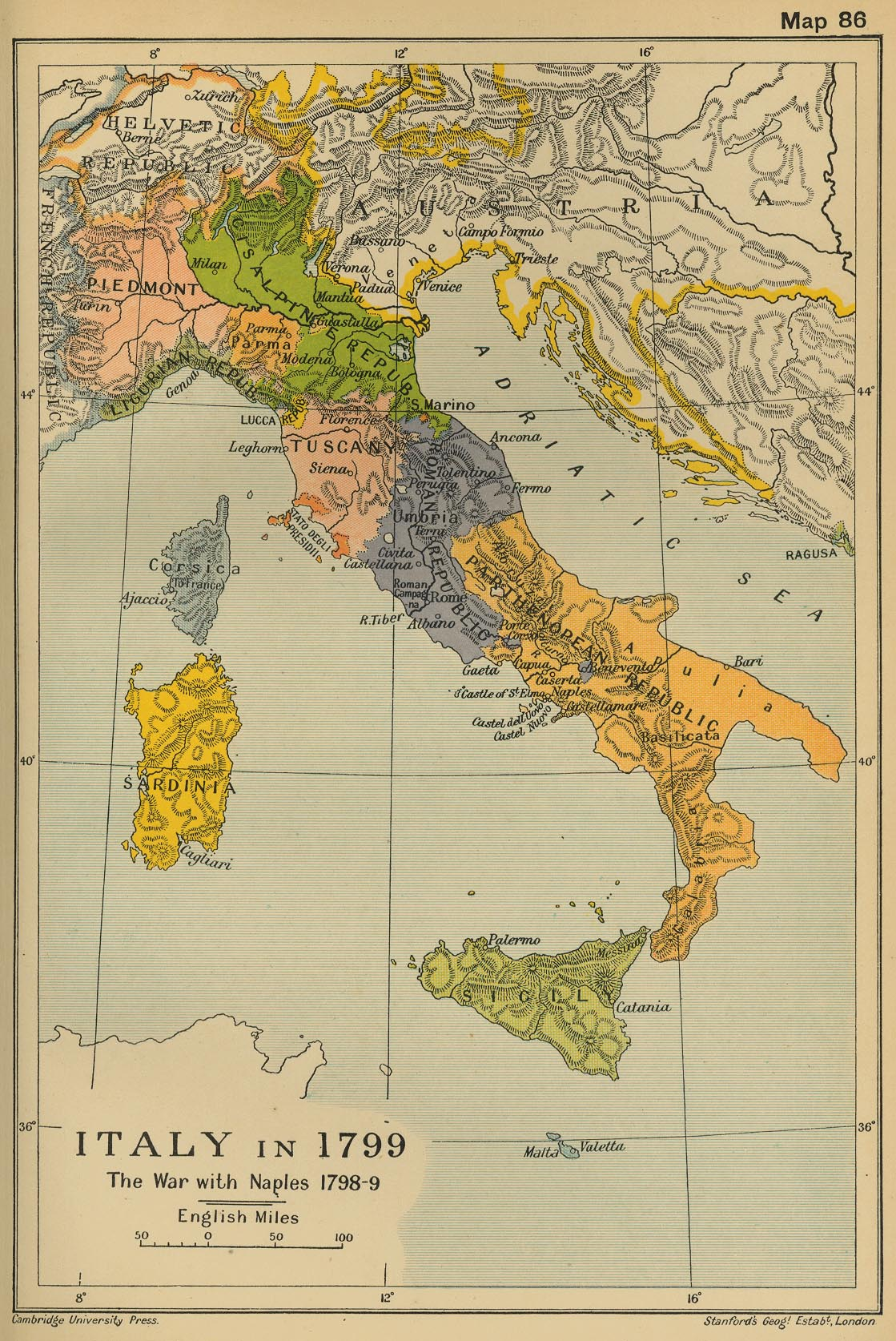
- Italy in 1799, from the Atlas (1912)
- Country: United Kingdom
- Language: English
- Publisher: Cambridge University Press
- Published: 1902–1912; 1957–1979
- No. of books: 14 (Cambridge Modern History); 14 (New Cambridge Modern History)

The Cambridge Modern History is a comprehensive modern history of the world, beginning with the 15th century Age of Discovery, published by the Cambridge University Press in England and also in the United States.

The first series, planned by Lord Acton and edited by him with Stanley Mordaunt Leathes, Sir Adolphus William Ward and G. W. Prothero, was launched in 1902 and totalled fourteen volumes, the last of them being an historical atlas which appeared in 1912. The period covered was from 1450 to 1910. Each volume includes an extensive bibliography.

A second series, with entirely new editors and contributors, The New Cambridge Modern History, appeared in fourteen volumes between 1957 and 1979, again concluding with an atlas. It covered the world from 1450 to 1945.

== Planning and publishing ==
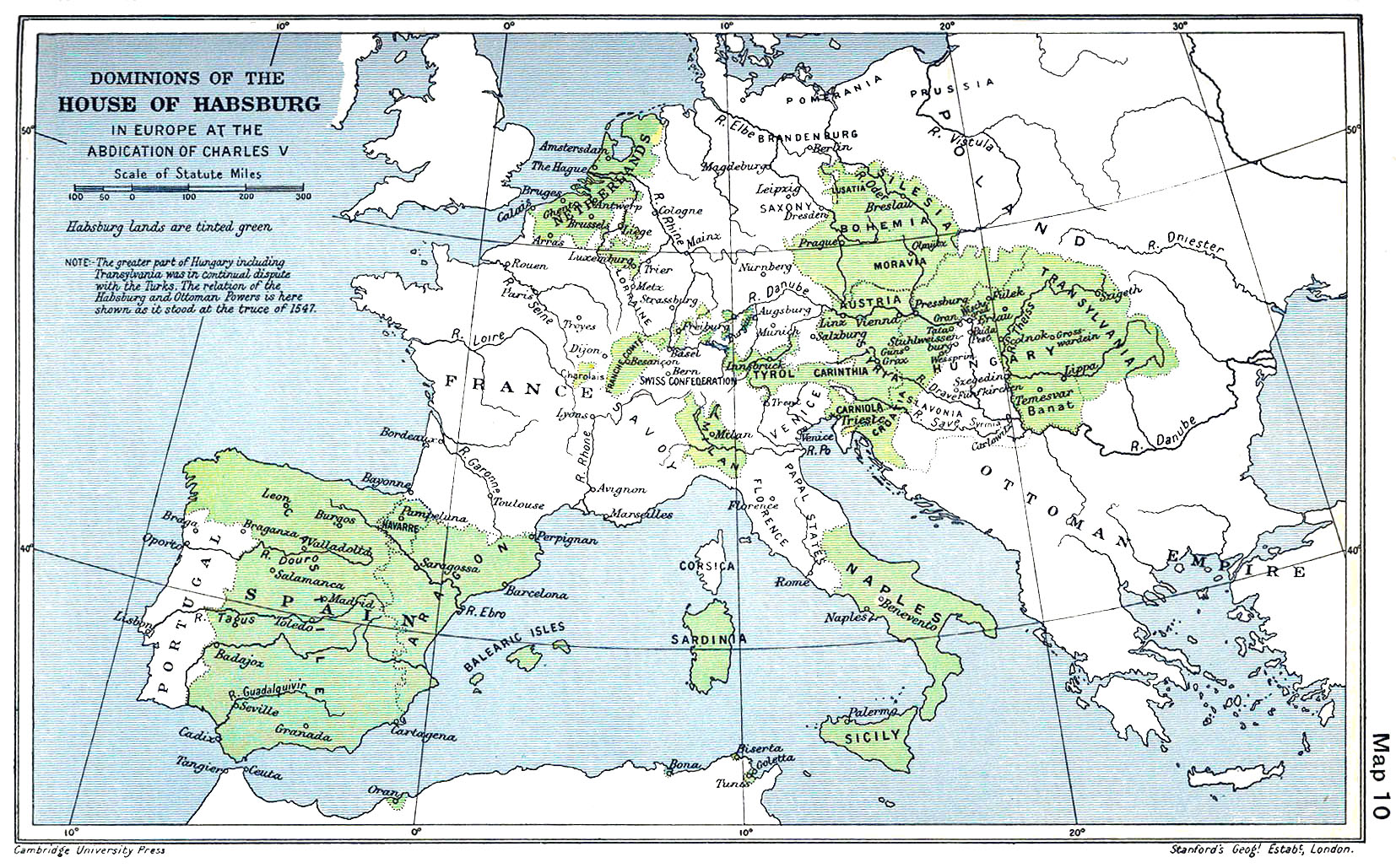
The dominions of Charles V in 1558, map from the atlas of 1912

The first discussions about creating The Cambridge Modern History took place in 1896.

The original Cambridge Modern History was planned by Lord Acton, who during 1899 and 1900 gave much of his time to coordinating the project, intended to be a monument of objective, detailed, and collaborative scholarship. Acton was Regius professor of modern history at Cambridge, and a fellow of All Souls, Oxford. He had previously established the English Historical Review in 1886 and had an exalted reputation.

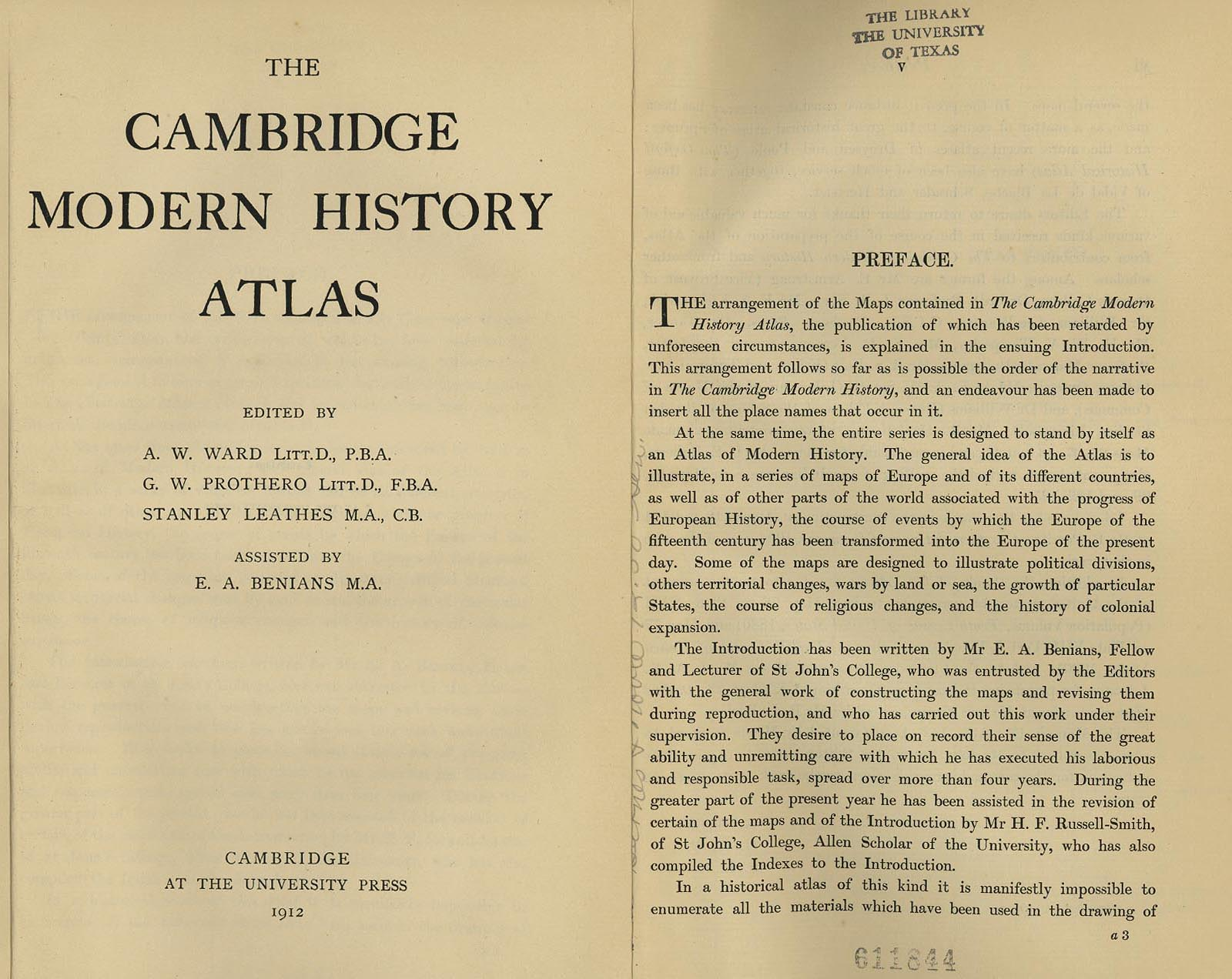
Cambridge Modern History Atlas (1912), title page

The new work was published in fourteen volumes between 1902 and 1912, in the British Isles by the Cambridge University Press and in the United States by Macmillan & Co. of New York City. Written mostly by English scholars, the first twelve volumes dealt with the history of the world from 1450 up to 1870. The final volume, numbered 12, was The Latest Age and appeared in 1910. There then followed two supplemental volumes.

The history was later followed by similar multi-volume works for the earlier ages, namely the Cambridge Ancient History and the Cambridge Medieval History. As the first of such histories, it later came to be seen as establishing a tradition of collaborative scholarship.

A second edition of the atlas (volume XIV) was published in 1924.

=== Volumes published ===
==== I. The Renaissance (1902) ====
Chapter	Title	Author
	Introductory Note	Mandell Creighton
1	The Age of Discovery	Edward John Payne
2	The New World	Edward John Payne
3	The Ottoman Conquest	John Bagnell Bury
4	Italy and her Invaders	Stanley Mordaunt Leathes
5	Florence (I): Savonarola	Edward Armstrong
6	Florence (II): Macchiavelli	Laurence Arthur Burd
7	Rome and the Temporal Power	Richard Garnett
8	Venice	Horatio Robert Forbes Brown
9	Germany and the Empire	Thomas Frederick Tout
10	Hungary and the Slavonic Kingdoms	Emil Reich
11	The Catholic Kings	Henry Butler Clarke
12	France	Stanley Mordaunt Leathes
13	The Netherlands	Adolphus William Ward
14	The Early Tudors	James Gairdner
15	Economic Change	William Cunningham
16	The Classical Renaissance	Richard Claverhouse Jebb
17	The Christian Renaissance	Montague Rhodes James
18	Catholic Europe	William Francis Barry
19	The Eve of the Reformation	Henry Charles Lea

==== II. The Reformation: The end of the Middle Ages (1903) ====
Chapter	Title	Author
1	Medicean Rome	Franz Xaver Kraus
2	Habsburg and Valois (I)	Stanley Mordaunt Leathes
3	Habsburg and Valois (II)	Stanley Mordaunt Leathes
4	Luther	Thomas Martin Lindsay
5	National Opposition to Rome in Germany	Albert Frederick Pollard
6	Social Revolution and Catholic Reaction in Germany	Albert Frederick Pollard
7	The Conflict of Creeds and Parties in Germany	Albert Frederick Pollard
8	Religious War in Germany	Albert Frederick Pollard
9	The Reformation in France	Arthur Augustus Tilley
10	The Helvetic Reformation	James Pounder Whitney
11	Calvin and the Reformed Church	Andrew Martin Fairbairn
12	The Catholic South	William Edward Collins
13	Henry VIII	James Gairdner
14	The Reformation under Edward VI	Albert Frederick Pollard
15	Philip and Mary	James Bass Mullinger
16	The Anglican Settlement and the Scottish Reformation	Frederic William Maitland
17	The Scandinavian North	William Edward Collins
17 Addendum	Note on the Reformation in Poland	Stanley Mordaunt Leathes
18	The Church and Reform	Reginald Vere Laurence
19	Tendencies of European Thought in the Age of the Reformation'	Andrew Martin Fairbairn

==== III. The Wars of Religion (1904) ====
Chapter	Title	Author
1	The Wars of Religion in France	Arthur John Butler
2	French Humanism and Montaigne	Arthur Augustus Tilley
3	The Catholic Reaction, and the Valois and Báthory Elections, in Poland	Robert Nisbet Bain
4	The Height of the Ottoman Power	Moritz Brosch
5	The Empire under Ferdinand I and Maximilian II	Adolphus William Ward
6	The Revolt of the Netherlands	George Edmundson
7	William the Silent	George Edmundson
8	Mary Stewart	Thomas Graves Law
9	The Elizabethan Naval War with Spain	John Knox Laughton
10	The Last Years of Elizabeth	Sidney Lee
11	The Elizabethan Age of English Literature	Sidney Lee
12	Tuscany and Savoy	Edward Armstrong
13	Rome under Sixtus V	Ugo Balzani
14	The End of the Italian Renaissance	Arthur John Butler
15	Spain under Philip II	Martin Hume
16	Spain under Philip III	Martin Hume
17	Britain under James I	Samuel Rawson Gardiner
18	Ireland to the Settlement of Ulster	Robert Dunlop
19	The Dutch Republic	George Edmundson
20	Henry IV of France	Stanley Mordaunt Leathes
21	The Empire under Rudolf II	Adolphus William Ward
22	Political Thought in the Sixteenth Century	John Neville Figgis

==== IV. The Thirty Years War (1906) ====
Chapter	Title	Author
1	The Outbreak of the Thirty Years' War	Adolphus William Ward
2	The Valtelline	Horatio Robert Forbes Brown
3	The Protestant Collapse (1620–30) (1) The Bohemian and the Palatinate War (1620-3) (2) The Lower-Saxon and Danish War (1623-9) (3) The Edict of Restitution and the Dismissal of Wallenstein (1628–30)	Adolphus William Ward
4	Richelieu	Stanley Mordaunt Leathes
5	The Vasa in Sweden and Poland (1560–1630)	William Fiddian Reddaway
6	Gustavus Adolphus (1630–2)	Adolphus William Ward
7	Wallenstein and Bernard of Weimar (1632–5) (1) Wallenstein's End (1632-4) (2) Nördlingen and Prague (1634-5)	Adolphus William Ward
8	The Constitutional Struggle in England (1625–40)	George Walter Prothero
9	The First Two Years of the Long Parliament (1640-2)	George Walter Prothero
10	The First Civil War (1642-7)	George Walter Prothero, and Ernest Marsh Lloyd
11	Presbyterians and Independents (1645-9)	George Walter Prothero, and Ernest Marsh Lloyd
12	The Westminster Assembly	William Arthur Shaw
13	The Later Years of the Thirty Years' War (1635–48)	Adolphus William Ward
14	The Peace of Westphalia	Adolphus William Ward
15	The Commonwealth and the Protectorate (1649–59)	William Arthur Shaw
16	The Navy of the Commonwealth and the First Dutch War	Joseph Robson Tanner
17	Scotland from the Accession of Charles I to the Restoration	Peter Hume Brown
18	Ireland from the Plantation of Ulster to the Cromwellian Settlement (1611-1659)	Robert Dunlop
19	Anarchy and the Restoration (1659–60)	Charles Harding Firth
20	The Scandinavian North (1559-1660)	William Fiddian Reddaway
21	Mazarin	Stanley Mordaunt Leathes
22	Spain and Spanish Italy under Philip III and IV	Martin Hume
23	Papal Policy, 1590-1648	Moritz Brosch
24	Frederick Henry, Prince of Orange	George Edmundson
25	The Transference of Colonial Power to the United Provinces and England	Hugh Edward Egerton
26	The Fantastic School of English Poetry	Arthur Clutton-Brock
27	Descartes and Cartesianism	Émile Boutroux

==== V. The Age of Louis XIV (1908) ====
Chapter	Title	Author
1	The Government of Louis XIV (1661–1715)	Arthur James Grant
2	The Foreign Policy of Louis XIV (1661–1697)	Arthur Hassall
3	French Seventeenth Century Literature and its European Influence	Émile Faguet
4	The Gallican Church	Stafford Harry Northcote (Viscount St Cyres)
5	The Stewart Restoration	Charles Harding Firth
6	The Literature of the English Restoration, Including Milton	Harold Hannynston Child
7	The Administrations of John de Witt and William of Orange' (1651–88)	George Edmundson
8 (1)	The Anglo-Dutch Wars: Naval Administration under Charles II and James II	Joseph Robson Tanner
8 (2)	The Anglo-Dutch Wars: The Wars (1664–74)	Christopher Thomas Atkinson
9	The Policy of Charles II and James II (1667–87)	John Pollock
10 (1)	The Revolution and the Revolution Settlement in Great Britain: England (1687-1702)	Harold William Vezeille Temperley
10 (2)	The Revolution and the Revolution Settlement in Great Britain: Scotland from the Restoration to the Union of the Parliaments (1660-1707)	Peter Hume Brown
10 (3)	The Revolution and the Revolution Settlement in Great Britain: Ireland from the Restoration to the Age of Resumptionn (1660-1700)	Robert Dunlop
11	Religious Toleration in England	Henry Melvill Gwatkin
12	Austria, Poland, and Turkey	Richard Lodge
13	The Treaties of Partition and the Spanish Succession	Wolfgang Michael
14 (1)	The War of the Spanish Succession: Campaigns and Negotiations	Christopher Thomas Atkinson
14 (2)	The War of the Spanish Succession: the Peace of Utrecht and the Supplementary Pacifications	Adolphus William Ward
15	Party Government under Queen Anne	Harold William Vezeille Temperley
16	Russia (1462–1682)	John Bagnell Bury
17	Peter the Great and His Pupils (1689–1730)	Robert Nisbet Bain
18	The Scandinavian Kingdoms	William Fiddian Reddaway
19	Charles XII and the Great Northern War	Robert Nisbet Bain
20	The Origins of the Kingdom of Prussia	Adolphus William Ward
21	The Great Elector and the First Prussian King	Adolphus William Ward
22 (1)	The Colonies and India: The Colonies	Ernest Alfred Benians
22 (2)	The Colonies and India: India	Paul Ernest Roberts
23 (1)	European Science in the Seventeenth and Earlier Years of the Eighteenth Century: Mathematics and Physical Science	Walter William Rouse Ball
23 (2)	European Science in the Seventeenth and Earlier Years of the Eighteenth Century: Other Branches of Science	Michael Foster
24	Latitudinarianism and Pietism	Moritz Kaufmann

==== VI. The Eighteenth Century (1909) ====
Chapter	Title	Author
1 (1)	Great Britain under George I: The Hanoverian Succession	Adolphus William Ward
1 (2)	Great Britain under George I: The Foreign Policy of George I (1714–21)	James Frederick Chance
2	The Age of Walpole and the Pelhams	Harold William Vezeille Temperley
3	Jacobotism and the Union	Charles Sanford Terry
4	The Bourbon Governments in France and Spain. I. (1714–26)	Edward Armstrong
5	The Bourbon Governments in France and Spain. II. (1727–46)	Edward Armstrong
6	Financial Experiments and Colonial Development	Ernest Alfred Benians
7	Poland under the Saxon Kings	Robert Nisbet Bain
8 (1)	The War of the Austrian Succession: The Pragmatic Sanction	Christopher Thomas Atkinson
8 (2)	The War of the Austrian Succession: Prussia under Frederick William I	Emil Daniels
8 (3)	The War of the Austrian Succession: The War	Christopher Thomas Atkinson
9	The Seven Years' War; For a four-page addendum on naval operations see Volume XIII	Emil Daniels
10	Russia Under Anne and Elizabeth	Robert Nisbet Bain
11	The Reversal of Alliances and the Family Compact	Jean Lemoine
12	Spain and Portugal (1746–94) (1) Spain under Ferdinand VI and Charles III (2) Portugal (1750–93) (3) Brazil (Seventeenth and Eighteenth Centuries)	George Edmundson
13 (1)	Great Britain (1756–93): William Pitt the Elder	Wolfgang Michael
13 (2)	Great Britain (1756–93): The King's Friends	James Macmullen Rigg
13 (3)	Great Britain (1756–93): The Years of Peace and the Rise of the Younger Pitt (1782–93)	Martin J. Griffin
14	Ireland in the Eighteenth Century	Robert Dunlop
15 (1)	India: The Moghul Empire	Alfred Comyn Lyall
15 (2)	India: The English and French in India (1720–63)	Paul Ernest Roberts
15 (3)	India: Clive and Warren Hastings	Paul Ernest Roberts
16	Italy and the Papacy	Mrs. H. M. Vernon (Katharine Dorothea Ewart)
17	Switzerland from the Treaty of Aarau to the French Revolution	Johann Jacob Schollenberger
18	Joseph II	Eugène Hubert
19	Catharine II	Otto Hötsch
20 (1)	Frederick the Great and His Successor: Home and Foreign Policy (1763–97)	Emil Daniels
20 (2)	Frederick the Great and His Successor: Poland and Prussia	Otto Hötsch
21	Denmark under the Bernstorffs and Struensee	William Fiddian Reddaway
22	The Hats and Caps and Gustavus III (1721–92)	Robert Nisbet Bain
23	English Political Philosophy in the Seventeenth and Eighteenth Centuries	Arthur Lionel Smith
24	The Romantic Movement in European Literature	Charles Edwyn Vaughan

==== VII. The United States (1903) ====
Scanned full text here (Archive.org)

Chapter	Title	Author
1	The First Century of English Colonisation (1607-1700)	John Andrew Doyle
2	The English Colonies (1700-1763)	John Andrew Doyle
3	The French in America (1608-1744)	Mary Bateson
4	The Conquest of Canada (1744-1761)	Arthur Granville Bradley
5	The Quarrel with Great Britain (1761-1776)	John Andrew Doyle
6	The Declaration of Independence (1761-1776)	Melville Madison Bigelow
7	The War of Independence (1776-1783)	John Andrew Doyle
8	The Constitution (1776-1789)	Melville Madison Bigelow
9	The Struggle for Commercial Independence (1783-1812)	John Bach McMaster
10	The War of 1812-1815	Herbert Wrigley Wilson
11	The Growth of the Nation (1815-1828)	John Bach McMaster
12	Commerce, Expansion and Slavery (1828-1850)	John Bach McMaster
13	State Rights (1850-1860)	Woodrow Wilson
14	The Civil War: I (1861)	John George Nicolay
15	The Civil War: II (1862-1863)	John George Nicolay
16	The Civil War: III (1864-1865)	John George Nicolay
17	Naval Operation of the Civil War (1861-1865)	Herbert Wrigley Wilson
18	The North during the War (1861-1865)	John George Nicolay
19	The South during the War (1861-1865)	John Christopher Schwab
20	Political Reconstruction (1865-1885)	Theodore Clarke Smith
21	The United States as a World-Power (1885-1902)	John Bassett Moore
22	Economic Development of the United States	Henry Crosby Emery
23	The American Intellect	Barrett Wendell

==== VIII. The French Revolution (1904) ====
Chapter	Title	Author
1	Philosophy and the Revolution	Paul Ferdinand Willert
2	The Government of France	Francis Charles Montague
3	Finance	Henry Higgs
4	Louis XVI	Francis Charles Montague
5	The Elections to the States General	Francis Charles Montague
6	The National Assembly, and the Spread of Anarchy	Francis Charles Montague
7	The Constitution of 1791	Francis Charles Montague
8	The Legislative Assembly	John Ronald Moreton Macdonald
9	The National Convention to the Fall of the Gironde	John Ronald Moreton Macdonald
10	The Foreign Policy of Pitt to the Outbreak of War with France	Oscar Browning
11	The European Powers and the Eastern Question	Richard Lodge
12	The Terror	John Ronald Moreton Macdonald
13	The Thermidorian Reaction and the End of the Convention	John Ronald Moreton Macdonald
14	The General War	Richard Phillipson Dunn-Pattison
15	The Naval War	Herbert Wrigley Wilson
16	The Directory	George Knottesford Fortescue
17	The Extinction of Poland, 1788–97	Richard Lodge
18	Bonaparte and the Conquest of Italy	John Holland Rose
19	The Egyptian Expedition	John Holland Rose
20	The Struggle for the Mediterranean	Herbert Wrigley Wilson
21	The Second Coalition	John Holland Rose
22	Brumaire	Herbert Albert Laurens Fisher
23	Revolutionary Finance	Henry Higgs
24	French Law in the Age of the Revolution	Paul Viollet
25	Europe and the French Revolution	George Peabody Gooch

==== IX. Napoleon (1906) ====
Chapter	Title	Author
1	The Consulate, 1799-1804	Georges Pariset
2	The Armed Neutrality, 1780-1801	Thomas Alfred Walker and Herbert Wrigley Wilson
3	The Pacification of Europe, 1799-1802	Anton Guilland
4	France and Her Tributaries, 1801-3	Anton Guilland
5	France under the Empire, 1804–14	Georges Pariset
6	The Codes	Herbert Albert Laurens Fisher
7	The Concordats	Leopold George Wickham Legg
8	The Command of the Sea, 1803–15	Herbert Wrigley Wilson
9	The Third Coalition. I. 1805-6	Ernest Marsh Lloyd
10	The Third Coalition. II. 1806-7	Ernest Marsh Lloyd
11	The Napoleonic Empire at Its Height, 1807-9	John Holland Rose
12	The War of 1809	August Keim
13	The Continental System, 1809–14	John Holland Rose
14	The French Dependencies, and Switzerland, 1800–14	Herbert Albert Laurens Fisher (The French Dependencies), and Anton Guilland (Switzerland)
15	The Peninsular War, 1808–14	Charles William Chadwick Oman
16	Russia under Alexander I, and the Invasion of 1812	Eugen Stschepkin
17	The War of Liberation, 1813-4	Julius von Pflugk-Harttung
18	The First Restoration, 1814-5	Herbert Albert Laurens Fisher
19	The Congress of Vienna, I. 1814-5	Adolphus William Ward
20	The Hundred Days, 1815	Charles William Chadwick Oman
21	The Congress of Vienna, II. 1814-5	Adolphus William Ward
22	Great Britain and Ireland, 1792-1815	George Peabody Gooch
23	The British Empire, 1783-1815	William Holden Hutton (India and Ceylon), and Hugh Edward Egerton (The Colonies)
24	St. Helena	Herbert Albert Laurens Fisher

==== X. The Restoration (1907) ====
Chapter	Title	Author
1	The Congresses, 1815–22	Walter Alison Phillips
2	The Doctrinaires	Charlotte Julia von Leyden Blennerhassett
3	Reaction and Revolution in France	Émile Bourgeois
4	Italy	Carlo Segré
5	The Papacy and the Catholic Church	Charlotte Julia von Leyden Blennerhassett
6	Greece and the Balkan Peninsula	Walter Alison Phillips
7	Spain (1815–45)	Rafael Altamira
8	The Spanish Dominions in America	Frederick Alexander Kirkpatrick
9	The Establishment of Independence in Spanish America	Frederick Alexander Kirkpatrick
10	Brazil and Portugal	George Edmundson
11	The Germanic Federation (1815–40)	Albert Frederick Pollard
12	Literature in Germany	John George Robertson
13	Russia	Szymon Askenazy
14	Poland and the Polish Revolution	Szymon Askenazy
15	The Orleans Monarchy	Émile Bourgeois
16	The Low Countries	George Edmundson
17	Mehmet Ali	Walter Alison Phillips
18	Great Britain (1815–32)	Harold William Vezeille Temperley
19	Catholic Emancipation	Henry William Carless Davis
20	Great Britain and Ireland (1832–41)	George Peabody Gooch
21	Canada	Ernest Alfred Benians
22	The Revolution in English Poetry and Fiction	William John Courthope
23	Economic Change	John Harold Clapham
24	The British Economists	Joseph Shield Nicholson

==== XI. The Growth of Nationalities (1909) ====
Chapter	Title	Author
1	Great Britain and Free Trade (1841–52)	John Harold Clapham
2	The Fall of Constitutionalism in France (1840-8)	Émile Bourgeois
3	Liberalism and Nationality in Germany and Austria (1840-8)	Friedrich Meinecke
4	Italy in Revolution (1846-9)	Ernesto Masi
5	The French Republic	Émile Bourgeois
6	The Revolution and the Reaction in Germany and Austria. I. (1848-9)	Adolphus William Ward
7	The Revolution and the Reaction in Germany and Austria. II.	Adolphus William Ward
8	The Achievement of Swiss Federal Unity	Wilhelm Oechsli
9 (1)	Russia and the Levant: Russia under Nicholas I	Geoffrey Drage
9 (2)	Russia and the Levant: The Levant	Edward Charles Blech
10	Napoleon III and the Period of Personal Government (1852-9)	Albert Thomas
11	Great Britain and the Crimean War (1852-6)	Spencer Walpole
12	Great Britain, Last Years of Whiggism, Parliamentary Reform (1856–68)	Spencer Walpole
13	English Literature (1840–70)	Hugh Walker
14	Cavour and the Kingdom of Italy (1849–61)	Ernesto Masi
15 (1)	Austria, Prussia, and the Germanic Confederation: Reaction and Reorganisation (1852–62)	Heinrich Friedjung
15 (2)	Austria, Prussia, and the Germanic Confederation: German Literature (1840–70)	Karl Hermann Breul
15 (3)	Austria, Prussia, and the Germanic Confederation: The National Spirit in Hungarian Literature (1686-1900)	Arthur Battishill Yolland
16	Bismarck and German Unity	Gustav Roloff
17	The Liberal Empire (1859–70)	Albert Thomas
18	The Reaction against Romanticism in French Literature (1840–71)	Émile Bourgeois
19 (1)	The Completion of Italian Unity: The Successors of Cavour (1861–70)	Ernesto Masi
19 (2)	The Completion of Italian Unity: The Literature of the Risorgimento and After (1846–70)	Carlo Segré
20	The Course of the Revolution in Spain and Portugal (1845–71)	James Fitzmaurice-Kelly
21	The Franco-German War (1870-1)	Frederick Barton Maurice
22 (1)	Russia and the Levant after the Crimean War: Russia and the Period of Reform	Geoffrey Drage
22 (2)	Russia and the Levant after the Crimean War: The Balkan Lands	Edward Charles Blech
22 (3)	Russia and the Levant after the Crimean War: Russian Literasture (1800-1900)	Geoffrey Drage
22 (4)	Russia and the Levant after the Crimean War: National Influences in Bohemian and Polish Literature	Robert Nisbet Bain
23	Holland and Belgium (1839–70) (1) Holland (2) Belgium (3) The Luxemburg Question (4) Literature in the Netherlands (1800–70)	George Edmundson
24 (1)	Scandinavia (1815–70): Sweden and Norway	William Fiddian Reddaway
24 (2)	Scandinavia (1815–70): Denmark	William Fiddian Reddaway
24 (3)	Dano-Norwegian Literature	Edmund Gosse
25	Rome and the Vatican Council (1846–70)	G. Alfred Fawkes
26	India and Afghanistan (1815–69)	William Lee-Warner
27 (1)	Great Britain and Her Colonies: The New Colonial Policy (1840–70)	Harold William Vezeille Temperley
27 (2)	Great Britain and Her Colonies: The Federation of Canada	Stuart Johnson Reid
27 (3)	Great Britain and Her Colonies: The English and Dutch in South Africa (1815–70)	Archibald Ross Colquhoun
27 (4)	Great Britain and Her Colonies: The Development of Australasia (1815–70)	John Davenport Rogers
28	The Far East (1815–71) (1) China and her Intercourse with Western Powers (2) Japan	Ernest Mason Satow

==== XII. The Latest Age (1910) ====
Chapter	Title	Author
1	Modern Europe	Stanley Mordaunt Leathes
2	Foreign Relations of the United States during the Civil War	John Westlake
3	Great Britain	Stanley Mordaunt Leathes
4	Ireland and the Home Rule Movement	Robert Dunlop
5	The Third French Republic	Émile Bourgeois
6	The German Empire (1) The First Seven Years of the Empire (1871-7) (2) The Triple Alliance and the Culminating Period of Bismarck's Ascendancy (3) Bismarck's Fall, and After (1888-1910)	Hermann Oncken
7	Austria-Hungary	Louis Eisenmann
8	United Italy	Thomas Okey
9	The Low Countries; Holland; Belgium	George Edmundson
10	The Iberian Peninsula; Spain; Portugal	David Hannay
11	Scandinavia; Sweden; Norway and the Dissolution of the Union; Denmark	Ludvig Stavenow
12	Reaction and Revolution in Russia	Bernard Pares
13	The Reform Movement in Russia	Bernard Pares
14	The Ottoman Empire and the Balkan Peninsula	William Miller
15	Egypt and the Egyptian Sudan (1841-1907)	Fleming Mant Sandwith
16	The British Empire in India	Paul Ernest Roberts
17	The Far East; China; Annam; The Philippine Islands; The Malay Peninsula; Siam	Robert Kennaway
18	The Regeneration of Japan	Joseph Henry Longford
19	The Russo-Japanese War	Frederick Barton Maurice
20	The European Colonies	Ernest Alfred Benians
21 (1)	The Republics of Latin America: (1) Historical Sketch to 1896	Frederick Alexander Kirkpatrick
21 (2)	The Republics of Latin America: {2} The International Position of the Latin American Races	Santiago Perez Triana
22	The Modern Law of Nations and the Prevention of War	Frederick Pollock
23	Social Movements	Sidney Webb
24	The Scientific Age	William Cecil Dampier Whetham
25	Modern Explorations	John Davenport Rogers
27	The Growth of Historical Science	George Peabody Gooch

==== XIII. Tables and General Index (1911) ====
This volume includes

- A four-page addendum, written by Ernest Alfred Benians, to Chapter 9 of Volume 6: Naval Operations in the Period of the Seven Years' War
- Genealogical Tables and Lists
  - 1. Genealogical Tables of Ruling and Noble Houses (112 tables)
  - 2. Lists of Spiritual Princes, Elected Sovereigns, Etc. (28 lists)
  - 3. Lists of Parliaments, General Councils, Etc. (6 lists)
- General Index to all volumes

==== XIV. Atlas (1912, 2nd ed. 1924) ====
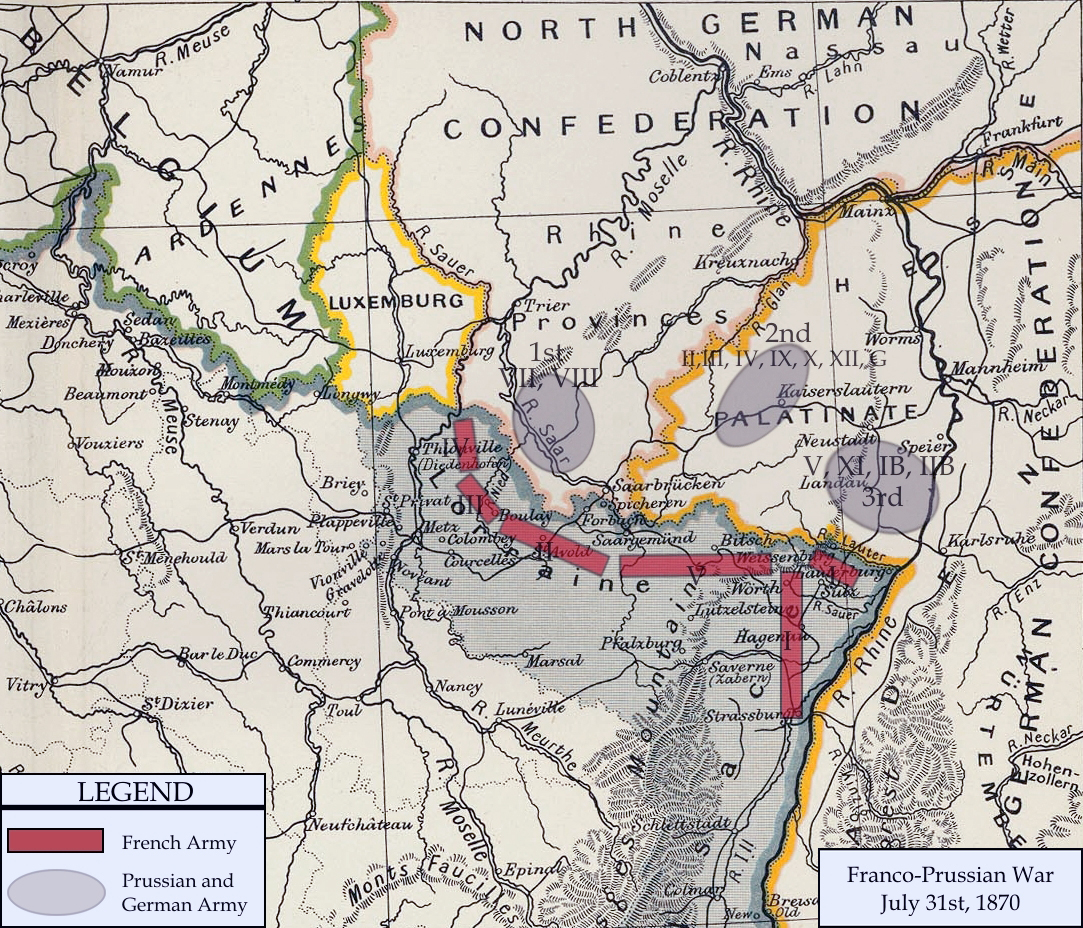
A map of the Franco-Prussian War from the 1912 atlas

This volume begins with an extensive introduction to the maps, written by Ernest Alfred Benians. It is divided into several sections:

- I. Europe in the Fifteenth Century
- II. The Age of Habsburg Power and of the Reformation
- III. The Rise of France and Sweden
- IV. The Formation of the Great Powers of the Eighteenth Century
- V. The Age of the Revolution and of Napoleon
- VI. Since 1815

Except for the first, each is in turn subsectioned for Europe and "Greater Europe", with the latter term referring mostly to the colonial empires. A separate index is provided for the introduction.

There are 141 maps in this volume. Two-page maps are bound in such a way as to prevent information from being lost in the gutter between pages. The concluding index gives the latitude and longitude of the places named.
