= Mary Atkinson =

Mary Atkinson may refer to:

- M. E. Atkinson (Mary Evelyn Atkinson, 1899–1974), English children's writer
- Mary Atkinson (bailiff), first female court bailiff in the United States, in 1870 in Wyoming
- Mary Atkinson Maurice (1797–1858), British teacher, educationist, and writer
- Mary Atkinson (Victoria roll of honour), 2001 inductee on the Victorian Honour Roll of Women, Australia
- Mary Atkinson (suffragette), English feminist
