= Charles Vaughan =

Charles Vaughan may refer to:

== Members of parliament ==
- Charles Vaughan (of Porthamal) (died 1630), Welsh landowner and politician who sat in the House of Commons in 1614 and 1625
- Charles Vaughan (by 1529-74 or later), MP for Radnorshire
- Charles Vaughan (MP for Shaftesbury), represented Shaftesbury (UK Parliament constituency) in 1572

== Others ==
- Charles Vaughan (priest) (1816–1897), English churchman and scholar
- Charles Richard Vaughan (1774–1849), British diplomat
- Charles Edwyn Vaughan (1854–1922), British academic who specialised in English literature and political philosophy
- Charles Vaughan (Emmerdale), character in Emmerdale UK TV series
- Charles Vaughan, character in Survivors UK TV series

== See also ==
- Charles Vaughan-Lee (1867–1928), British naval officer
- Charlie Vaughan (disambiguation)
