= Melville M. Bigelow =

American legal academic (1846–1921)

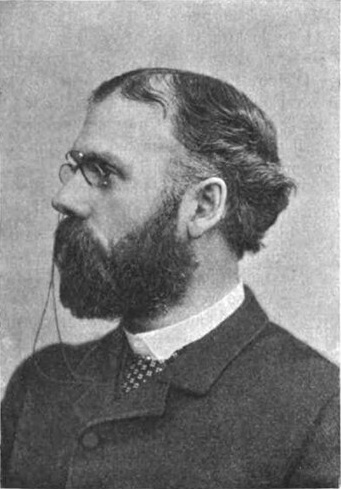
Melville M. Bigelow in the 1880s

Melville Madison Bigelow (August 2, 1846 – May 4, 1921) was an American legal academic who wrote influential books and papers on legal history, and served as dean of Boston University School of Law from 1902 to 1911.

== Early life, education, and career ==
Born in Eaton Rapids, Michigan, the son of William Enos Bigelow, a Methodist minister, and Daphne Florence (Madison) Bigelow, of the Madison family of Virginia, Bigelow attended public schools in Michigan and graduated from the University of Michigan, receiving an A.B. degree in 1866, an LL.B. in 1868, and an A.M. in 1871. He gained admission to the bar in Tennessee in 1868, and moved to Cambridge, Massachusetts, in 1870 to pursue a career as a legal scholar rather than as a practicing attorney.

== Academic career ==
Bigelow participated in planning the establishment of the Boston University School of Law, helping prepare the report recommending its creation before joining its original faculty in 1872. Before his death nearly fifty years later, he noted that he had lectured to every graduating class since the school's founding.

Initially lecturing on estoppel, he later taught torts, bills and notes, and insurance. While teaching at Boston University, Bigelow completed a Ph.D. in history at Harvard University in 1879. In 1889, The Green Bag described him as being known throughout the United States and England for his legal writings, with his treatise on torts having been adopted as a textbook by the University of Cambridge, and praised him as "one of the finest law lecturers in America".

Bigelow twice declined deanship offers from other law schools, but in 1902, he succeeded Samuel Bennett at Boston University as dean of the law school. In that position he expanded the curriculum by strengthening existing subjects and adding new courses taught by additional faculty. He resigned the deanship in 1911 due to waning health, but continued directing the school's postgraduate instruction until shortly before his death.

He visited England several times, and during these visits he "sat more than once on the bench of the high courts at the invitation of the Lord Chief Justices".

== Scholarship ==
Bigelow was among the leading American legal scholars of the late nineteenth century. His books were used in law schools throughout the United States and were also translated and studied in India, China, Japan, and South America.

His best-known legal treatises included The Law of Estoppel (which reached its sixth edition), The Law of Torts (which reached its eighth edition), Leading Cases in the Law of Torts, The Law of Fraudulent Conveyances, The Law of Bills, Notes and Cheques, and The Law of Wills. He published the first edition of The Law of Estoppel at the age of twenty-four, and it remained the leading authority on the subject through multiple editions.

When The Cambridge Modern History was produced in England between 1902 and 1912, beginning under the editorship of John Dalberg-Acton, 1st Baron Acton shortly before his death, "Bigelow was one of the few Americans asked to contribute". Another of his works, The Law of Torts "was adopted as a text-book by the University of Cambridge in England", for which Bigelow prepared an edition specific to that country.

== Personal life and death ==
Bigelow married Elizabeth Chamberlain Bragg on September 16, 1869. They had three children: Ada Hawthorne Bigelow, Charlotte Gray Bigelow, and Leslie Melville Bigelow. Elizabeth died in 1881, and in 1883, Bigelow married Cornelia Frothingham Read, who died in 1892. He subsequently married Alice Bradford Woburn in 1898.

All three of Bigelow's children predeceased him. His daughters Ada and Charlotte died in childhood a month apart in 1876, while his son Leslie died of pneumonia in 1896, while a law student. Bigelow maintained close friendships with other legal scholars, including Oliver Wendell Holmes Jr., and when Leslie died, Holmes wrote a moving letter of condolence.

Bigelow died at Corey Hill Hospital in Brookline, Massachusetts, after an illness of several weeks, at the age of 74.
