= Charlie Vaughan =

Charlie Vaughan may refer to:

- Charlie Vaughan (baseball) (born 1947), Major League Baseball pitcher during the 1960s for the Atlanta Braves
- Charlie Vaughan (footballer), English forward from the 1940s and 1950s who played for Charlton Athletic and Portsmouth

== See also ==
- Charles Vaughan (disambiguation)
