= George Edmundson =

British historian and clergyman

George Edmundson (4 February 1848 – 3 July 1930) was a clergyman of the Church of England and academic historian of the University of Oxford. He took up benefices in Northolt and Chelsea and in retirement lived in the south of France.

== Early life ==
Born at Redcar House in Redcar, Yorkshire, Edmundson was the eldest son of the Rev. George Edmundson of Redcar and St Leonards-on-Sea, by his marriage to Elizabeth Anne, daughter of William Whytehead of Thirsk. His father was lord of the manor of Agglethorpe in Coverdale. He was educated at St Peter's School, York, and at Magdalen College, Oxford, where he was a demy. He took a first class in Mathematical Moderations in 1869 and another first in Maths in 1870, graduated BA in 1871, won the Senior Hall Greek Testament Prize in 1873, and proceeded MA in 1874.

== Career ==
In 1871 Edmundson was elected to an Open Fellowship at Brasenose and was Mathematical Lecturer there from 1871 to 1880 and also a college tutor from 1875 to 1880. He was ordained a deacon of the Church of England in 1872 and a priest in 1874. From 1875 to 1881 he was Junior Bursar of his college and in the university was Mathematical Examiner for Final Honour Schools for 1875–76.

In 1880, Edmundson accepted the benefice of Northolt, Middlesex, where he remained until 1906, when he became Vicar of St Saviour's, Upper Chelsea, retiring in 1920. He was also Rural Dean of Chelsea from 1916 to 1920.

From 1896 to 1899, Edmundson worked for the British Government in the matter of a Boundary Arbitration between British Guiana and Venezuela, and from 1901 to 1904 he worked for the government again on a Boundary Arbitration between British Guiana and Brazil. His work was research, under the direction of Sir Charles Alexander Harris, who later wrote "To the staff who worked under my direction in the two Guiana arbitration cases, where extreme accuracy and patience were required, I find it difficult to record my indebtedness. Mr de Villiers, my co-editor of Storm, and Dr Edmundson were with me throughout."

One of Edmundson's major works, The Church of Rome in the First Century, appeared in 1913, having originated as the Bampton Lectures for that year. Much later, J. A. T. Robinson praised it highly. In his Redating the New Testament (1977), he noted that Edmundson's book had largely been ignored at the time, perhaps because he was not a professional New Testament scholar and his conclusions were radically different from the consensus of the "higher criticism" of his day.

In 1917–18, Edmundson worked for the Foreign Office's Historical Department.

He married Florence Brooke Turner, the daughter of Joseph Brooke Turner, of Edgerton, Yorkshire, and they had one son and one daughter.

He retired to a house named the Villa Nicette, at Saint-Raphaël in the south of France and died on 3 July 1930.

== Honours ==
- Foreign Member of the Netherlands Association of Literature, 1886
- Fellow of the Royal Historical Society, 1894
- Honorary Member of the Dutch Historical Society, 1897
- Fellow of the Royal Geographical Society, 1911
- Ford's Lecturer in English History (University of Oxford) 1909–1910
- Bampton Lecturer, 1913

== Major publications ==
- Milton and Vondel, a Curiosity of Literature, 1885
- The Swedish Legend in British Guiana: an historical investigation (1900)
- 'The Revolt of the Netherlands', 'William the Silent' and 'The Dutch Republic' in Cambridge Modern History, vol. III The Wars of Religion (1904)
- Archbishop Laud and his Work, 1905
- 'The Administrations of John de Witt and William of Orange (1651–88)' in Cambridge Modern History, vol. V The Age of Louis XIV (1908)
- Anglo-Dutch Rivalry in the First Half of the 17th Century (The Ford Lectures), 1910
- Intellect and Power, the Pride Sermon, 1912
- The Church in Rome in the First Century: an examination of various controverted questions relating to its history, chronology, literature and traditions: eight lectures preached before the University of Oxford (Longmans, Green, 1913)
- History of Holland (Cambridge History Series), 1922
- The Journal, Travels, and Labours of Father Samuel Fritz, in the River Amazon, 1686–1723, translation from Spanish, edited for the Hakluyt Society, 1922
