= Arthur John Butler =

- Born: June 21, 1844; Putney, London
- Died: February 26, 1910
- Education: Eton College, Trinity College Cambridge
- Occupations: Professor of Italian language and literature
- Employer: University College London

Arthur John Butler (21 June 1844 – 26 February 1910), was an English scholar, editor, and mountaineer, professor of Italian language and literature at University College London.

Apart from his work on Dante and other Italian poets, Butler translated books from German and French, including the memoirs of Bismarck, Thiébault, and Marbot, and work by Sainte-Beuve. He also contributed to the Cambridge Modern History and the Dictionary of National Biography and in the 1890s was editor of the Alpine Journal.

== Early life ==
Butler was born at Putney, the son of the Rev. William John Butler (1818–1894), later Dean of Lincoln, by his marriage to Emma Barnett (1813–1894), a daughter of George Henry Barnett, a banker, of Glympton Park, Woodstock. Butler was the eldest of at least five children. His sisters were Grace Harriet (born 1847), Edith Emma (1851–1936), and Mary Avice (1855–1938), while his brother was William George (1849–1938). Their grandfather John La Forey Butler (1786–1848), was a banker in the firm of H. & I. Johnstone, and their uncle Henry Barnett was also a banker, as well as being a Conservative member of parliament. Both Butler parents were supporters of the High Church Tractarian movement. In 1848, William John Butler founded the Community of St Mary the Virgin.

Brought up at Wantage, where his father was Vicar, in 1853 Butler won a scholarship to St Andrew's College, Bradfield, but in 1857 he migrated to Eton, after which he gained a scholarship at Trinity College, Cambridge. In 1867 he graduated eighth in the Classical Tripos and was also a junior optime in the mathematical tripos.

== Life and work ==
In 1869 Butler became a Fellow of Trinity, but in 1870 he was appointed a Board of Education examiner. He worked in the Education office in Whitehall until 1887, then joined the publishers Rivington and Co. as a partner, later moving to Cassell & Company as chief editor. In 1894 he became an assistant commissioner for secondary education and from 1898 until his death was professor of Italian language and literature at University College London. From 1899 on he also did much editorial work at the Public Record Office.

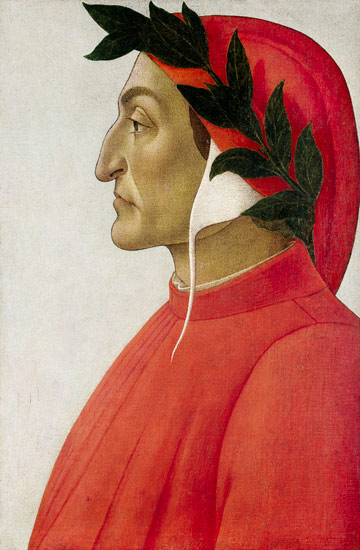
Dante

Butler contributed much to the study of Dante's Divine Comedy. A prose translation of Purgatory, with notes, was published in 1880, followed by Paradise (1885) and Hell (1892), then a translation of Scartazzini's Companion to Dante (1893), and Dante: his Times and his Work (1895).

Moving on to other writers, Butler translated and edited the Memoirs of Baron de Marbot (1892), some correspondence of Cavour (1894), Select Essays of Sainte-Beuve (1895), the Memoirs of Baron Thiébault (1896), Friedrich Ratzel's The History of Mankind (1896), and Bismarck: the Man and the Statesman (1898), from Bismarck's Gedanken und Erinnerungen. He worked at the Public Record Office from 1899 until his death, editing calendars of foreign papers from the year 1577. Four such volumes appeared between 1901 and 1909. He also wrote two chapters for the third volume of The Cambridge Modern History (1904), 'The Wars of Religion in France' and 'The End of the Italian Renaissance'.

Butler's final work, completed just before his death, was The Forerunners of Dante (1910), a selection from early Italian poets.

In December 1901, Butler received the degree D.Litt. from Brasenose College, Oxford.

== Family life ==
On 6 April 1875 Butler married Mary Caroline, a daughter of William Gilson Humphry, Vicar of St Martin-in-the-Fields. They had one son and six daughters. The children of the marriage included Frances Mary (1876–1926), who became a headmistress, William Martin (1882–1919), who died in France while serving as a Major in the Royal Engineers, Margaret Dorothy (1884–1973), Rhoda (1887–1979), and Mary Caroline (born 1891).

The family lived at Wood End, Weybridge, where Butler died in February 1910. He was buried at Wantage, his childhood home.

== Alpinist ==
From his schooldays Butler was a keen climber. He first attempted routes in the Ötztal Alps in 1874, and in 1886 he joined the Alpine Club. From 1890 to 1893 he edited the club's Alpine Journal. He was also one of the "Sunday Tramps" group created by Leslie Stephen in 1882.

Butler's concept of mountaineering was less competitive than that of some others. In several of his articles he looked down upon what his biographer called "the fuss made about peak-climbing".

== Collections ==
University College London Special Collections holds letters from Butler written in 1909.

== See also ==
- Works by Arthur John Butler at Wikisource
- Quiller-Couch, Arthur Thomas (1912). "Butler, Arthur John" . In Lee, Sidney (ed.). Dictionary of National Biography (2nd supplement). London: Smith, Elder & Co.
