= Émile Bourgeois =

French historian

Émile Bourgeois (24 July 1857 – 25 August 1934) was a French historian.

== Life ==
Born in Paris, Bourgeois was educated at the École Normale Supérieure in rue d'Ulm and later taught at the École supérieure de journalisme de Paris. A specialist in 17th century history, in 1895 Bourgeois was appointed as maître de conférence at an École normale supérieure, but he gave up the post in 1904 to accept a professorship in history at the Sorbonne, where he remained until he retired in 1921. Early in the 20th century he became a contributor to The Cambridge Modern History.

In 1920 he was elected to the Académie des sciences morales et politiques and died in 1934.

== Selected works ==
- Le capitulaire de Kiersy-sur-Oise (877) (Paris: Hachette, 1885)
- Neuchâtel et la politique prussienne en Franche-Comté (1702-1713) d'après des documents inédits des archives de Paris, Berlin et Neuchâtel (Paris: E. Leroux, 1887)
- Manuel historique de politique étrangère (Paris : Belin frères, 1892-1898, 2 vols)
- Le Grand siècle : Louis XIV, les arts, les idées (Paris: Hachette, 1896)
- Les Réformes de l'enseignement secondaire, note présentée à la Commission de l'enseignement de la Chambre des Députés (8 février 1899) (Versailles: Cerf, 1899)
- L'Enseignement secondaire selon le vœu de la France (Paris: A. Chevalier-Marescq, 1900)
- Édition d'Ézéchiel Spanheim, Relation de la cour de France en 1690 (Paris: A. Picard et fils, 1900)
- Les Archives d'art de la Manufacture de Sèvres, rapport adressé à M. le ministre de l'instruction publique et des beaux-arts et inventaire sommaire (Paris: Cerf, 1905)
- La Diplomatie secrète au XVIIIe siècle, ses débuts (Paris: A. Colin, 1907)
- édition de Recueil des instructions données aux ambassadeurs et ministres de France depuis les traités de Westphalie jusqu'à la Révolution française. XIII, Hollande (Paris: E. de Boccard, 1924)
- Les sources de l'histoire de France : le XVIIe siècle (1610-1715) (Paris: A. Picard et fils, 1913-1935, 8 vols)
