= Edward Armstrong (historian) =

English historian (1846–1928)

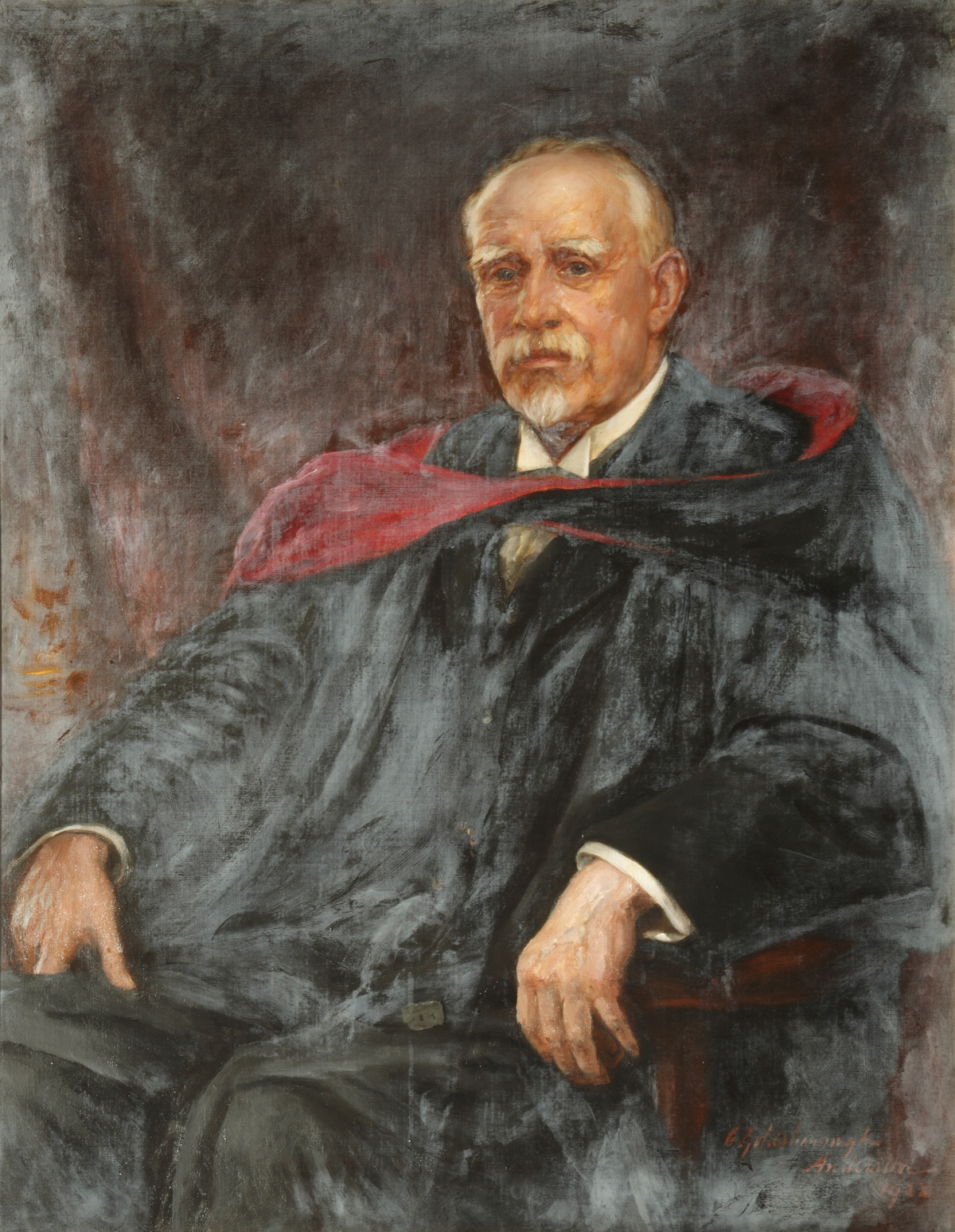
Portrait by Charles Goldsborough Anderson.

Edward Armstrong FBA (3 March 1846 – 14 April 1928) was an English historian.

== Biography ==
He was born in Tidenham, Gloucestershire, the son of John Armstrong, later Bishop of Grahamstown.

Armstrong was educated at Bradfield College and Exeter College, Oxford, and became a Fellow of The Queen's College, Oxford. Armstrong wrote books on Charles V, Elisabeth Farnese, and Lorenzo de' Medici. He also contributed to The Cambridge Modern History and the 1911 Encyclopædia Britannica.

Armstrong served as warden of Bradfield College from 1920 to 1925.

His first wife, Mabel née Watson, died in 1920. In 1921 he married his second wife, Geraldine Prynne Harriss (born 1899), who was the third daughter of Rev. James Adolphus Harriss (1859–1919).

== Selected publications ==
- Lorenzo De' Medici and Florence in the Fifteenth Century. G. P. Putnam's Sons. 1896.
- Elisabeth Farnese. Longmans, Green & Co. 1892.
- The Emperor Charles V. Vol. I. Macmillan & Co. 1902.
- The Emperor Charles V. Vol. II. Macmillan & Co. 1902.
- The French Wars of Religion: Their Political Aspects. Blackwell. 1904.
