= Lawrence Burd =

British schoolmaster and philatelist (1863–1931)

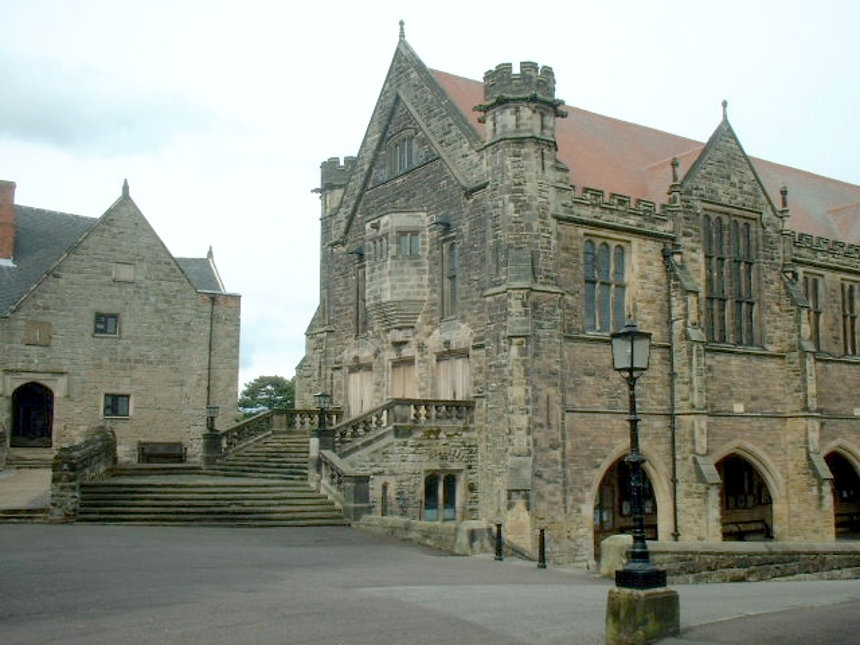
Repton School in 2007

Lawrence Arthur Burd FRHistS FRPSL (sometimes "Laurence"; 1 June 1863 – 12 April 1931) was a British public school schoolmaster, expert on the works of Niccolò Machiavelli, and also notable as a philatelist.

== Education and career ==
Burd was educated at Clifton College under Dr. Percival and attended Balliol College, Oxford. He received his B.A. in 1885 and his M.A. in 1888. He spent a year travelling as a tutor to Lord Acton's son and in 1886 joined the teaching staff of Repton School where he stayed until he retired in 1923, becoming the Classical Sixth Form master. He stocked, almost from scratch, the school library there, making it one of the best in the country, and the Repton library building is still known as the Burd Library.

Burd remained an active historical scholar throughout his teaching career. He was a Fellow of the Royal Historical Society and he produced a new edited edition of Machiavelli's Il Principe (The Prince) (1891) which was highly praised in The English Historical Review and described as leaving nothing to be desired. He also wrote the chapter on "Florence and Machiavelli" in Lord Acton's The Cambridge Modern History (Volume 1, 1902).

== Hobbies ==
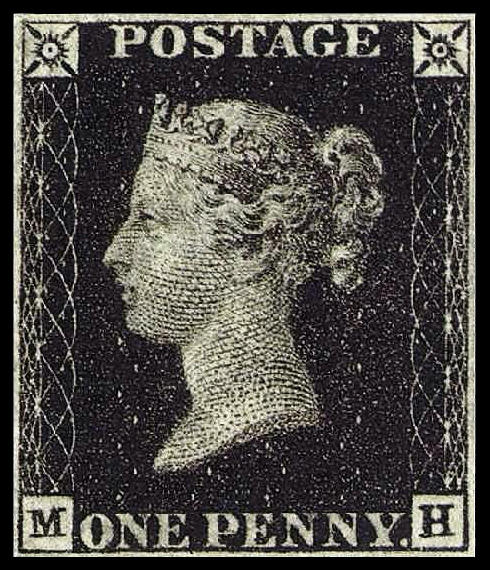
The Penny Black

The Times commented, in its obituary for Burd, that he was "a man of many hobbies - fishing, the 'cello, stamp-collecting, cycling and portrait photography - but he took them up one at a time until he had achieved success in each".

In philately, Burd specialised in early Great Britain, particularly pre-adhesive mail. He was an early student of plating and was one of a small group of dedicated collectors who succeeded in plating the Penny Black. In 1922 he reminisced in The London Philatelist about the task of which he said "To most observers it must have appeared a visionary undertaking, the self-imposed task of quixotic idealists, whose conclusions could admit neither verification nor refutation." He described the painstaking nature of the activity: "year by year the work was carried forward-patiently, methodically, cautiously: perplexities were disentangled, hypotheses discarded or confirmed, until at length, in the fullness of time, the goal has been reached: a task, too great for the span of any single mind, has been completed". His collection of 8,000 Penny Blacks, each "scientifically classified and indexed", was sold to the stamp dealer Charles Nissen in 1919.

Burd was a member of the Royal Philatelic Society London from 1918 and signed the Roll of Distinguished Philatelists in 1924.

== Death ==
Burd died at home, at The Pastures, Repton, on 12 April 1931 aged 67. He was survived by his wife and two children.

== Selected publications ==
- Il Principe by Niccolò Machiavelli. Clarendon Press, Oxford, 1891. (Editor) (Introduction by Lord Acton)
