= Ugo Balzani =

Italian historian

Count Ugo Balzani (6 November 1847 – 27 February 1916) was an Italian historian, born in Rome and educated there in the universities of that city. He became known as a distinguished scholar in his chosen field and honors were heaped upon him at home and abroad. He was made a member of the Reale Accademia dei Lincei and of the Istitutio Storico Italiano, and was chosen president of the Reale Società romana di storia patria. In England the University of Oxford conferred upon him the honorary degree of D.Litt in October 1902, in connection with the tercentenary of the Bodleian Library, and the British Academy elected him a corresponding fellow. He contributed many articles and reports to various institutions.

== Selected works ==
- Il Regesto di Farfa di Gregorio da Catino (1879)
- La Storia di Roma nella Cronica di Adamo da Usk (1880)
- Early Chroniclers of Italy (1883)
- La Cronache Italiane nel Medio Evo (1884; 1909)
- The Popes and the Hohenstaufen (1886)
- Rome under Sixtus V, chapter 13 of Cambridge Modern History, vol. III: The Wars of Religion (1904)
