= Ernest Marsh Lloyd =

British soldier and historian

Ernest Marsh Lloyd (September 1840 – 11 January 1922) was a British soldier and historian, a contributor to the Dictionary of National Biography and the Cambridge Modern History.

== Early life ==
Born in London in 1840, Lloyd was the third son of Francis Lloyd, a tobacco manufacturer, of Snow Hill in the City of London. After Blackheath Proprietary School, he trained for an army career at the Royal Military Academy, Woolwich.

== Career ==
Lloyd was commissioned into the Royal Engineers on 22 June 1859. His early career was spent mainly on coastal defences work at Dover, the Isle of Portland, Hobart, Hong Kong, and Tynemouth. In 1872 he was appointed as Instructor and Professor of Fortification at the Royal Military Academy, Woolwich, and remained there for ten years. For five years from 1887 he was Assistant Inspector-General of Fortifications at the War Office. Having retired from the British Army in 1892, during the Boer War he was recalled to work in the Intelligence Division of the War Office, with the brevet rank of Colonel.

Lloyd's first published work was The Mine Warfare at Sebastopol (1877). He wrote more than one hundred articles for the Dictionary of National Biography, including the biography of Arthur Wellesley, 1st Duke of Wellington, and some chapters of the early twentieth-century Cambridge Modern History. He also contributed to the Quarterly Review.

Lloyd was elected as a vice-president of the Royal Historical Society and was vice-chairman of the Epsom Board of Guardians and a member of the Athenæum Club.

== Personal life ==
In 1862, at St Mary's, Dover, Lloyd (then of Amwell House, Hoddesdon) married Rosa Harriette Davies, of Christchurch, Hampshire, and they had four children. He died at home, at Glenhurst, Brighton Road, Sutton, Surrey, in January 1922.

== Selected publications ==
- The Mine Warfare at Sebastopol (1877)
- Vauban, Montalembert, Carnot: Engineer Studies (London: Chapman and Hall, 1885)
- Review of the History of Infantry (1898)
- Cambridge Modern History, Vol. IV, (1906) chapter 10 "The First Civil War (1642-7)" and chapter 11 "Presbyterians and Independents (1645-9)"
- Cambridge Modern History, Vol. IX (1906), chapters 9 and 10
