= Hugh Egerton =

British historian (1855–1927)

Hugh Edward Egerton (19 April 1855 – 21 May 1927) was a British historian.

== Life ==
He was the second son of Edward Christopher Egerton, Member of Parliament for Macclesfield and East Cheshire, and his wife Lady Mary Frances Pierrepont, daughter of Charles Pierrepont, 2nd Earl Manvers. He was educated at Rugby School and matriculated in 1873 Corpus Christi College, Oxford, where he gained a First Class degree in literae humaniores in 1876, graduating B.A. and M.A. in 1881. In 1880 he was called to the bar at the Inner Temple and worked on the North Wales and Chester Circuit.

In 1885 Egerton was appointed assistant private secretary to Edward Stanhope, who became Secretary of State for the Colonies in 1886. Stanhope appointed Egerton to the managing committee of the Emigrants Information Office and one of its tasks was to write a handbook on Britain's colonies, to which Egerton contributed.

In 1905 Egerton became the first Beit Professor of Colonial History at Oxford, a position which he held until 1920. He was also appointed a Fellow of All Souls College, Oxford, in 1905.

== Works ==
In 1900 Egerton published a biography of Stamford Raffles and he edited a collection of Sir William Molesworth's speeches in 1903. He contributed to The Cambridge Modern History. Other works were:

- A short history of British colonial policy (1897). It became a standard work and reached a sixth edition by 1920. It was the first comprehensive survey of British colonial history in relation to the political ideas that had shaped it.
- The origin and growth of greater Britain; an introduction to Sir C. P. Lucas's Historical geography (1903).
- The Origin & Growth of the English Colonies and of their System of Government (1903).
- Federations and unions within the British Empire (1911).
- (editor), The Royal Commission on the Losses and Services of American Loyalists, 1783-1785 (1915).
- British foreign policy in Europe to the end of the 19th century; a rough outline (1917).
- British colonial policy in the XXth century (1922).
- The causes and character of the American revolution (1923)

In the pamphlet Is the British Empire the Result of Wholesale Robbery, Egerton said the answer was no, arguing that it was "false" to suggest that "our empire took its rise in violence." He argued that the British engaged in "peaceful occupation of, apparently, vacant lands" and that trouble arose from nearby aboriginals. He defended British Empire on the basis of a civilizing mission, arguing that the British had no choice but to bring Asians and Africans into contact with European civilization for the betterment of the natives.

== Family ==
In 1886 Egerton married Margaret Trotter, sister of Coutts Trotter. They had one son and two daughters. Lucas Malet was a family friend, and stayed with the Egertons at Mountfield Court in Sussex in 1899.

Mountfield Court had been left with a lifetime to his mother by his father, who died in 1869: she died in 1905. It then passed to his elder brother Charles Augustus Egerton (1846–1912), a barrister.
