= Wolfgang Michael =

German historian

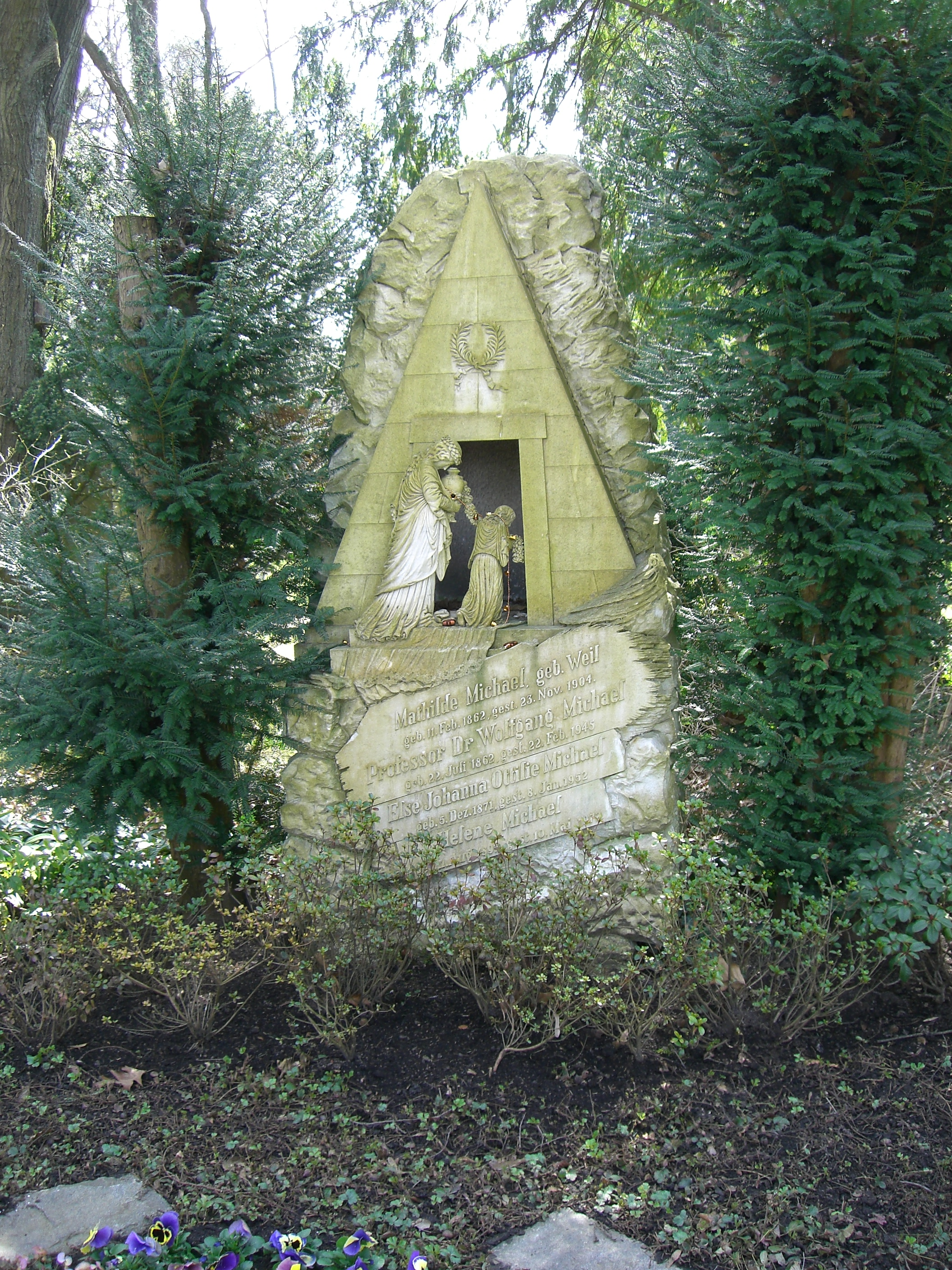
Wolfgang Michael's gravestone

Wolfgang Michael (22 July 1862 – 22 February 1945) was a German historian. He specialised in British history and was Professor of History at the University of Freiburg.

== Works ==
- Cromwell (Berlin: Ernst Hofmann & Co., 1907).
- 'The Treaties of Partition and the Spanish Succession' in A. W. Ward, G. W. Prothero and Stanley Leathers (eds.), The Cambridge Modern History, Volume V: The Age of Louis XIV (Cambridge: Cambridge University Press, 1908), pp. 372–400.
- England under George I: The Beginnings of the Hanoverian Dynasty (London: Macmillan, 1936).
- England under George I: The Quadruple Alliance (London: Macmillan, 1939).
