= William Reddaway =

English scholar

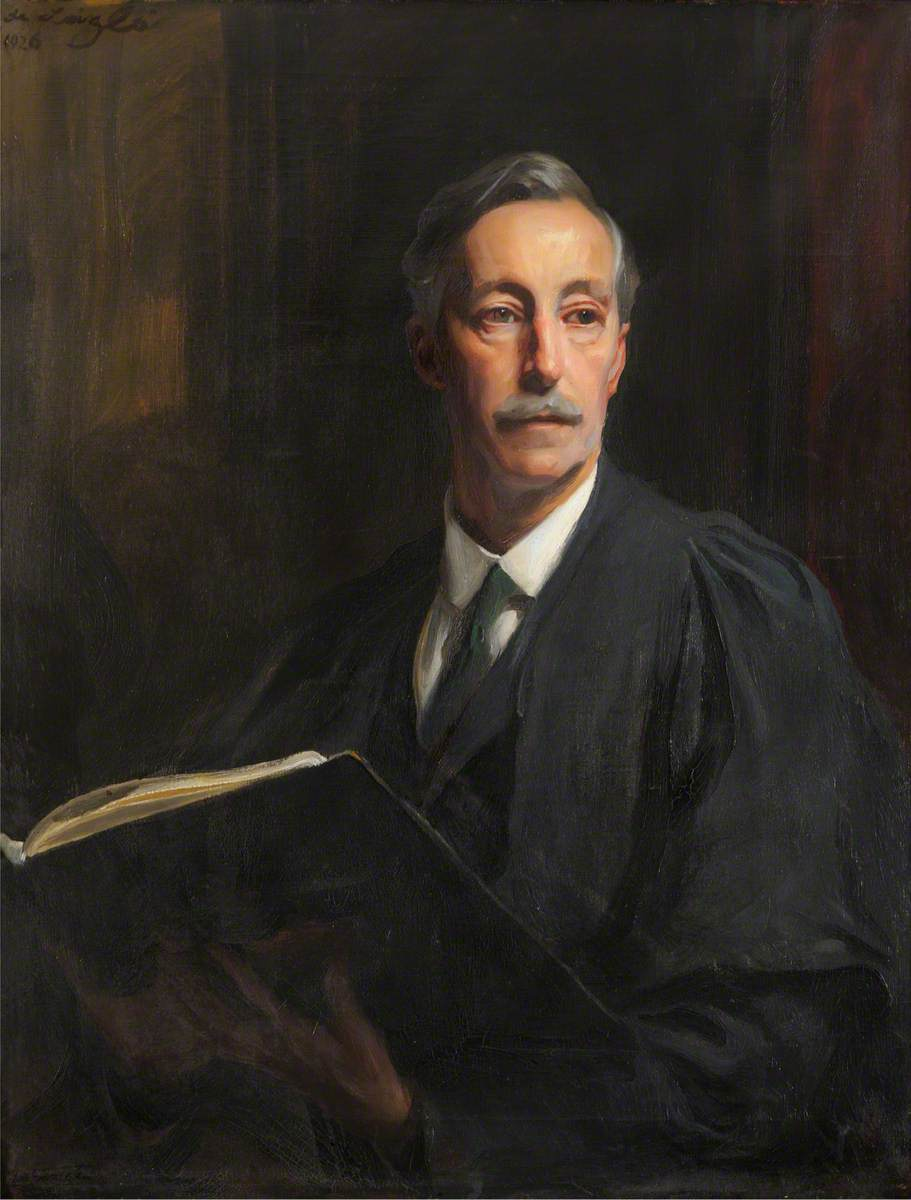
Portrait by Philip de László, 1926

William Fiddian Reddaway (Middleton, Lancashire 2 August 1872 – 31 January 1949) was an academic and author in the very late 19th and early 20th centuries.

Reddaway was educated at The Leys School and King's College, Cambridge. He was a Fellow of King's from 1897; and a Tutor at Fitzwilliam House, Cambridge from 1898 to 1907. He was also University Lecturer in History and Director of Scandinavian Studies; and Censor of Fitzwilliam House, Cambridge from 1907 to 1924.

He was extremely helpful in the admission of Subhas Chandra Bose in Cambridge, and his efforts prevented the loss of a term for Bose due to the delay in his admission. Subhas Bose also consulted him before he resigned from the Indian Civil Service. Reddaway heartily approved of his ideas, although surprised. Agreeing with Bose, he said that he preferred a journalistic career to a monotonous one like the Civil Service.

== Selected publications ==
- The Monroe Doctrine. The University Press, Cambridge 1898, (online).
- The Monroe Doctrine. The University Press, Cambridge 1898, (online).
- Frederick the Great and the rise of Prussia. G. P. Putnam’s Sons, New York, NY, 1904, (online).
- Frederick the Great and the rise of Prussia. G. P. Putnam's Sons, New York NY etc. 1904, (online).
- Introduction to the study of Russian history (= Helps for students of history. No. 25, Society for Promoting Christian Knowledge, London etc. 1920, (online).
- Marshal Pilsudski. Routledge, London 1939.
- Modern European history. A general sketch (1492–1924). Arnold, London 1924.
- as editor: Documents of Catherine the Great. The Correspondence with Voltaire, and the Instruction of 1767 in the English text of 1768. University Press, Cambridge etc. 1931.
- A History of Europe from 1715 to 1814 (= Methuen’s History of medieval and modern Europe. 7, ZDB-ID 1404770-6). Methuen, London 1936.
- Problems of the Baltic (= Current Problems. 2, ZDB-ID 421590-4). University Press, Cambridge etc. 1940.
- A History of Europe from 1610 to 1715 (= Methuen's History of medieval and modern Europe. 6). Methuen, London 1948.
