= Moritz Brosch =

Doctor Moritz Brosch
- Born: 7 April 1829; Prague, Bohemia, Austrian Empire
- Died: 14 July 1907 (aged 78); Venice, Veneto, Kingdom of Italy
- Occupations: Historian, journalist

Moritz Brosch (7 April 1829 – 14 July 1907) was a Austrian historian and professional English scholar.

== Life ==
Brosch was born on 7 April 1829 in Prague, Bohemia, Austrian Empire (now the Czech Republic). He was educated in Prague and Vienna, and became a journalist. Later he devoted himself to historical study, and he died on 14 July 1907 at Venice, where he had resided for over thirty years.

== Works ==
To the series Geschichte der europäischen Staaten Brosch contributed England 1509–1550 (6 vols., Gotha, 1884–1899), a continuation of the work of J.M. Lappenberg and R. Pauli, and Der Kirchenstaat (Gotha, 1880–1882). He gave further proof of his interest in English history by writing Lord Bolingbroke und die Whigs und Tories seiner Zeit (Frankfurt, 1883), and Oliver Cromwell und die puritanische Revolution (Frankfurt, 1886). He also wrote Julius II. und die Gründung des Kirchenstaats (Gotha, 1878), while one of his last pieces of work was to contribute a chapter on "The height of the Ottoman power" to vol. iii of the Cambridge Modern History (1904).
