= Mary Atkinson Maurice =

British teacher, educationalist, and author

- Born: 1797; Kirby Cane, Norfolk, England
- Died: 4 October 1858 (aged 60–61); Great Yarmouth, Norfolk
- Occupations: Teacher, educationist, and writer
- Organization(s): Governesses' Benevolent Institution; Queen's College, London
- Relatives: F.D. Maurice (brother)

Mary Atkinson Maurice (1797–1858) was a British teacher, educationist, and writer. With her encouragement, Mary's brother F. D. Maurice, founded Queen's College, London, of which she was a generous sponsor.

== Life ==
Mary Atkinson Maurice was born at Kirby Cane, Norfolk, to Priscilla (née Hurry) and Michael Maurice, Unitarian minister and schoolmaster. She was educated by her father, and was gifted in languages and literature. As she grew older, she began to help teach her younger sisters, and was regarded as extremely practical.

The family moved to Southampton in 1825, where Maurice–helped by her sister, Priscilla–opened her own school to help her family financially. Inspired by the ideas of educational reformer Johann Heinrich Pestalozzi, she had spent time at a Pestalozzian-based school in Cheam, run by Elizabeth and Charles Mayo. Now an Anglican, hers was a church school. It prospered, later prompting a move to Reading, where Maurice and her sister Esther ran the school for ten years. When Esther married in 1844, Mary gave up the school and moved to London.

In 1829, Maurice anonymously published an educational manual titled Aids to Development, intended for mothers. In 1837, she published Conversations on the Human Frame, and the Five Senses. In its preface she wrote:

In commencing a course of lessons on Natural History, the question presents itself, What is the right plan to be pursued? Is not the proper starting point the wonderful construction of our own frame, together with the curious instruments by which the mental powers are called into exercise; and should not this study always precede that of the habits and manners of other animals?

Once in London, Maurice became active in the work of the Governesses' Benevolent Institution (GBI), on whose committee her brother Frederick Denison Maurice, sat. The Institution aimed to improve the situation of governesses, and Mary Atkinson Maurice believed that education (leading to greater respect for the profession) was key to this. In 1847, she published Mothers and Governesses and two years later Governess Life: its Trials, Duties and Encouragements (1849). Maurice urged governesses to take up opportunities for education, promoting Queen's College, Harley Street, which had opened in 1848 under the auspices of the GBI. Her brother was its principal. She wrote that: "Every young person ought to study, with the idea that she will in all probability have to teach what she is now acquiring." She became a generous subscriber to Queen's College, as well as supporting the work of another of the GBI's initiatives, the Asylum for Aged Governesses.

Mary Atkinson Maurice died of peritonitis, in Great Yarmouth, on 4 October 1858. She was buried in St Nicholas's Church.

== Bibliography ==
- Aids to Development, Or, Mental and Moral Instruction Exemplified in Conversations Between a Mother and Her Children (1829)
- Open and See; Or, First Reading Lessons (1830)
- A Gift for Mothers (1833)
- Memorials of Two Sisters (1833)
- The Gospel manual; or, A brief abstract of the contents of every chapter in the four Evangelists (1834)
- Conversations on the Human Frame and the Five Senses (1837)
- Christian Counsel; or, a Farewell letter to a Sunday or weekly scholar (1837)
- Glenrock Sunday School: or, Lessons illustrative of a simple method of conveying religious instruction to the children of the poor (1840)
- The Strange Planet: And Other Stories (1844)
- Mothers and Governesses (1847)
- The Chartist's Friend (1848)
- Governess Life (1849)
- The Country and London (1849)
- The Crystal Palace; a Sequel to “The Country and London” (1852)
- The Patriot Warrior: an historical sketch of the life of the duke of Wellington (1853)
- Arthur, Or, The Motherless Boy (1857)
