= Hugh Walker (academic) =

British university educator (1855–1939)

- Born: 7 January 1855; Kilbirnie, Scotland
- Died: 28 June 1939 (aged 84)
- Education: University of Glasgow (MA); Balliol College, Oxford
- Occupation: University educator
- Organizations: St David's College, Lampeter

Hugh Walker (7 January 1855 – 28 June 1939) was a British university educator.

== Life ==
He was born in Kilbirnie, Scotland, on 7 January 1855. He attended Glasgow High School and then studied at Glasgow University, where he was awarded their medal in logic and moral philosophy, and achieved his MA degree. Walker then went on to study at Balliol College, Oxford, as Snell Exhibitioner, graduating with first-class honours in Literary Humanities in 1883. He would go on to receive an Honorary LLD from Glasgow and an Honorary DLitt from the University of Wales.

In 1884, Walker was appointed Lecturer in English and Philosophy at St David's College, Lampeter (now the University of Wales, Trinity Saint David). In 1890, he was made Professor in these same subjects. While at Lampeter, he regularly contributed to the college magazine. He loved the town and college dearly. He was mayor from 1900 to 1902, and the Vice-Principal's house on campus became affectionately known as "Walker's House". A Hall of Residence is also named after Walker.

Walker published widely. His works include various books on English literature, along with frequent contributions to journals such as the Yale Review, Hibbert Journal and Chambers' Journal. He contributed to Cambridge Modern History and Cambridge History of English Literature.

Walker was married to Janie (nee Roxburgh) and the couple had three daughters.

Walker was given the opportunity to retire in 1930, but refused this. He died on 28 June 1939, still a member of staff at Lampeter.

== Bibliography ==
This list may be incomplete

- Three Centuries of Scottish Literature, Glasgow, 1893
- The Greater Victorian Poets, London, 1895
- The Age of Tennyson, London, 1897
- John B. Leicester Warren, Lord de Tabley: a biographical sketch. London, 1903
- The Literature of the Victorian Era, Cambridge, 1910
- The English Essay and Essayists, London, 1915
- The English Satire and Satirists, 1925
