= Robert Nisbet Bain =

British historian and linguist (1854–1909)

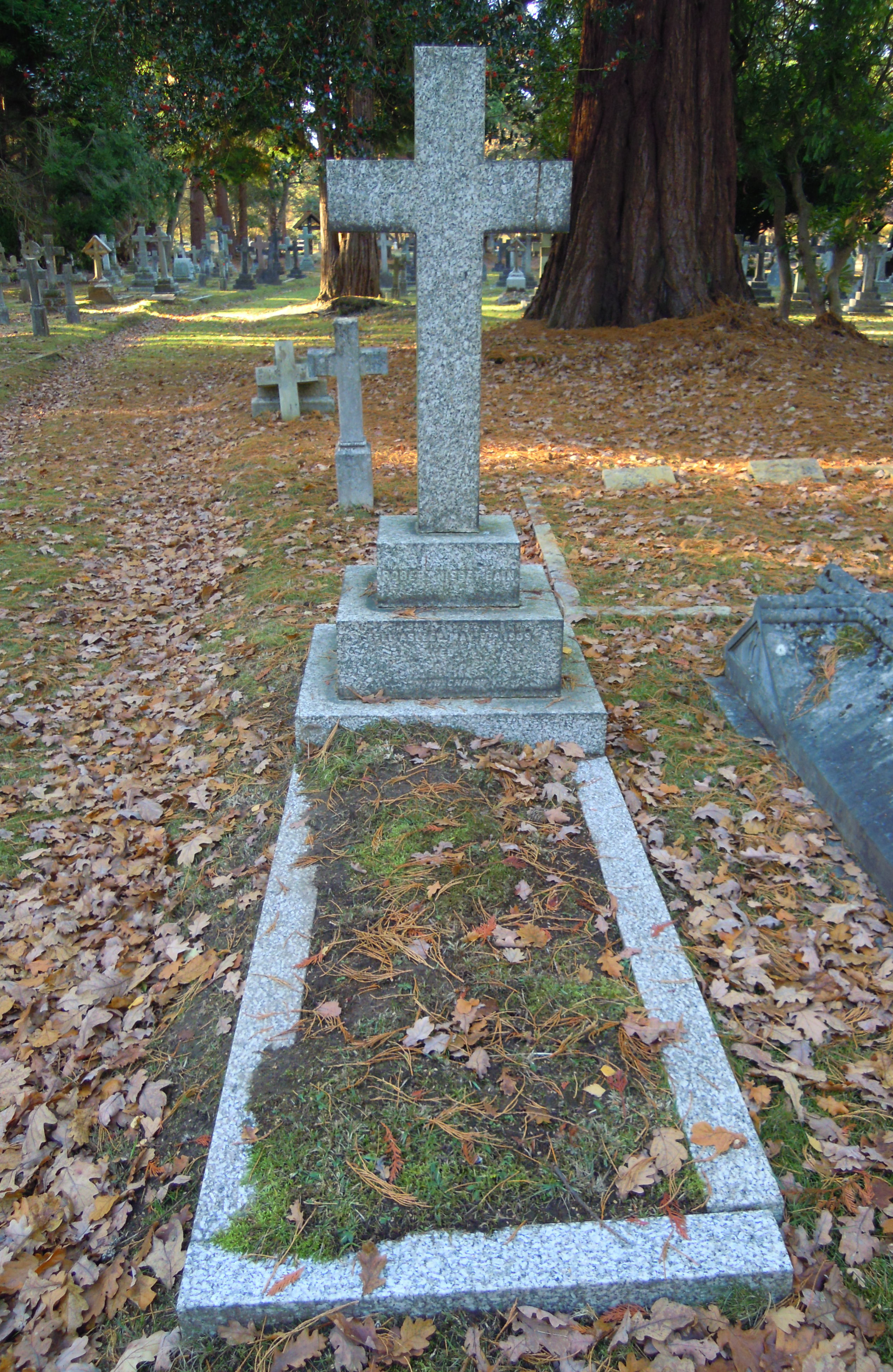
- The grave of Robert Nisbet Bain in Brookwood Cemetery
- Born: 1854
- Died: 1909 (aged 54–55)
- Employer: British Museum
- Known for: Linguist

Robert Nisbet Bain (1854–1909) was a British historian and linguist who worked for the British Museum.

== Life ==
Bain was born in London in 1854 to David and Elizabeth (born Cowan) Bain.

Bain was a fluent linguist who could use over twenty languages. Besides translating several books, he also used his skills to write learned books on foreign people and folklore. Bain was a frequent contributor to the Encyclopædia Britannica. His contributions were biographies and varied from Andrew Aagensen to Aleksander Wielopolski. He taught himself Hungarian so that he could read Mór Jókai in the original after first reading him in German. He translated from Finnish, Danish, and Russian and also tackled Turkish authors via Hungarian. He was the most prolific translator into English from Hungarian in the nineteenth century. He married late and died young after publishing a wide range of literature from or about Europe.

He is buried in Brookwood Cemetery.

== Works ==
- Gustavus III. and his contemporaries 1746-1792. 2 Bände. London: Kegan Paul, Trench, Trübner, 1894.
- The daughter of Peter the Great. A history of Russian diplomacy. Westminster: Archibald Constable, 1899
- Peter III. Emperor of Russia. The story of a crisis and a crime. London: Archibald Constable, 1902.
- Biography of Leo Tolstoy. 1903.
- Scandinavia. A political history of Denmark, Norway, and Sweden from 1513 to 1900. Cambridge: University Press, 1905
- The First Romanovs. A History of Moscovite Civilisation and the Rise of Modern Russia Under Peter the Great and His Forerunners, 1905. Reprint, New York: Russell & Russell, 1967.
- Slavonic Europe: A Political History of Poland and Russia from 1447 to 1796. Cambridge University Press, 1908.
- The last King of Poland and his contemporaries. London: Methuen, 1909
- Charles XII and the Collapse of the Swedish Empire 1682-1719. NA Kessinger Pub. Co. 2006, ISBN 1-4326-1903-9.

== Translations ==
- Russian Fairy Tales, 1892
- Cossack Fairy Tales and Folk Tales, London : Lawrence and Bullen, 1894
- Turkish Fairy Tales and Folk Tales, 1896
- Tales from Tolstoi, 1901
- Tales from Gorky, 1902

Translations

- Mór Jókai:
  - Egy Magyar Nábob, 1850; engl. A Hungarian Nabob, New York : DOUBLEDAY, PAGE & COMPANY 1899
  - The Day of Wrath
  - The Poor Plutocrats
  - Midst the Wild Carpathians
  - The Slaves of the Padishah
  - Halil the Pedlar
  - The Lion of Janina
  - Pretty Michal
  - Eyes Like the Sea
- Jonas Lauritz Idemil Lie:
  - Weird Tales from Northern Seas

== Bibliography ==
- Elias Bredsdorff: Danish Literature in English Translation; in: Orbis Litterarum 5 (1) 1947, S. 187–257.
- L. C. Wharton: Transcription of Foreign Tongues; in: Transactions of the Philological Society 29 (1), S. 59–112
- Roxoliana Zorivchak: The First English Translations of Ukrainian Fairy Tales; in: Forum 62 (Summer 1985): S. 9–11.
