= Charles Edwyn Vaughan =

Charles Edwyn Vaughan (10 February 1854 – 8 October 1922) was a British academic who specialised in English literature and political philosophy.

== Early life and academic career ==
Vaughan was born in Leicester and educated at Marlborough College. He matriculated at Balliol College, Oxford on 31 May 1873, and graduated with a BA in 1878 and an MA in 1883. Vaughan was one of the many students at Balliol who came under the influence of the idealist philosopher T. H. Green, who was also his cousin.

Vaughan served as Professor of English Language and Literature at three different institutions: University College, Cardiff between 1889 and 1898, the Durham College of Science from 1889 to 1904 and at the University of Leeds from 1904 until 1913. He then moved to Manchester and was appointed Governor of John Rylands Library.

Vaughan's magnum opus was the Political Writings of Jean-Jacques Rousseau, which he composed between the 1890s and 1915, when it was published in two volumes by Cambridge University Press. Harold Laski considered Vaughan as "much the best of his [Rousseau] editors" and said that he was "an ardent devotee" of Rousseau.

== Works ==
- 'Victor Hugo', The British Quarterly Review, Vol. 77 (January 1883), pp. 71–97.
- 'Mr. Browning', The British Quarterly Review, Vol. 80 (July 1884), pp. 1–27.
- 'Charles John Vaughan (1816–97)', The Dictionary of National Biography, Vol. 58 (1899), pp. 159–161.
- Selections from Burke's Reflections on the French Revolution, edited with introduction and notes by Charles Edward Vaughan (Rivingtons, 1892).
- Burke's Speeches on America, edited with introduction and notes by Charles Edward Vaughan (Rivingtons, 1893).
- The Duchess of Malfi. A Play written by John Webster, edited with a preface, notes and glossary by Charles Edward Vaughan (Dent, 1896).
- English Literary Criticism, introduction by Charles Edward Vaughan (Blackie & Son, 1896).
- John Milton, Areopagitica and other Tracts, edited by Charles Edward Vaughan (Dent, 1900).
- The Romantic Revolt (Blackwood Sr Sons, 1907).
- Types of Tragic Drama (Macmillan, 1908).
- 'The Romantic Movement in European Literature', The Cambridge Modern History, Vol. VI (Cambridge University Press, 1909), pp. 822–837.
- 'Tourneur and Webster', The Cambridge History of English Literature, Vol. VI (Cambridge University Press, 1910), pp. 166–187.
- 'Carlyle and His German Masters', Essays and Studies by Members of the English Association, Vol. I (Oxford University Press, 1910), pp. 168–196.
- 'Echoes of Old English Rhythm in Modern English Poetry', Transactions of the Yorkshire Dialect Society, Vol. II, Pt. 12 (Braford: Byles and Sons, 1911), pp. 20–38.
- Rousseau and His Enemies. Being the substance of a Lecture delivered before the Philosophical and Literary Society of Leeds on 7 February 1911 (R. Jackson, Leeds, n.d. [1911]).
- 'Sterne and the Novel of his Times', The Cambridge History of English Literature, Vol. X (Cambridge University Press, 1913), pp. 46–66.
- 'Coleridge', The Cambridge History of English Literature, Vol. XI (Cambridge University Press, 1914), pp. 117–139.
- The Influence of English Poetry upon the Romantic Revival on the Continent, British Academy Warton Lecture IV (Oxford University Press, 1914).
- Bibliographies of Swinburne, Morris and Rossetti, English Association Pamphlet, No. 29 (December 1914).
- Jean-Jacques Rousseau, The Political Writings, edited from the original manuscripts and authentic editions with introductions and notes by Charles Edwyn Vaughan (Cambridge University Press, 1915). 2 Vols.
- 'Charlotte and Emily Brontë: a comparison and a contrast', Charlotte Bronte, 1816–1916: A Centenary Memorial prepared by the Bronte Society, ed. Butler Wood (Fisher Unwin, 1917), pp. 173–206.
- Jean-Jacques Rousseau, A Lasting Peace through the Federation of Europe, and the State of War, translated by Charles Edwyn Vaughan (Constable, 1917).
- Jean-Jacques Rousseau, Du Contrat Social, ou Principes du Droit Politique, edited by Charles Edwyn Vaughan (Manchester University Press, 1918).
- Giambattista Vico: an Eighteenth Century Pioneer (Manchester University Press, for the John Rylands Library, 1921).
