= Mary Wilkinson =

English scholar (1909–2001)

Fair use image only

Elizabeth Mary Wilkinson FBA (1909–2001) was an English scholar of German literature and culture. She was said to be a role model for working class women with her Yorkshire accent, bold presence and scholarly knowledge.

== Life ==
Wilkinson was born in Keighley, Yorkshire, on 17 September 1909, and educated at Whalley Range High School in Manchester. She began studying German in 1929 at Bedford College, London where she was inspired by Professor J. G. Robertson to study German. (although she also credited Jane Eyre's study of Schiller). She gained a first at Bedford in 1932 and she took a Diploma in Education at Oxford in 1933. After teaching at schools in Clapham and Southampton, she became a research student under Edna Purdie. In 1943 she obtained a doctorate from the University of London, with a thesis on Johann Elias Schlegel.

Wilkinson briefly worked as an ambulance driver during the Second World War, and taught German at the relocated University College London department in Aberystwyth. She collaborated closely with L. A. Willoughby throughout the 1940s and 1950s. She delivered the Taylorian Lecture in Oxford in 1959. In 1961 she was appointed Professor of German at University College London, delivering her inaugural lecture on 25 October 1962. She was said to be a role model for working class women with her Yorkshire accent, bold presence and scholarly knowledge.

She was elected to the British Academy in 1972. She retired in 1976, and a Festschrift was published in her honour in 1978, under the title Tradition and Creation.

She lived in Camden and had Alzheimer's disease for seven years before she died on 2 January 2001.

== Publications ==
- Schiller, Kabale und Liebe, edited by Elizabeth M. Wilkinson and L. A. Willoughby (1944)
- Johann Elias Schlegel: A German Pioneer in Aesthetics (1945)
- Goethe's Conception of Form (1951)
- Goethe: Poet and Thinker (1962)
- Goethe Revisited: A Collection of Essays, edited by Elizabeth Mary Wilkinson (1984)
