= Life on the Lagoons =

1884 book by Horatio Brown

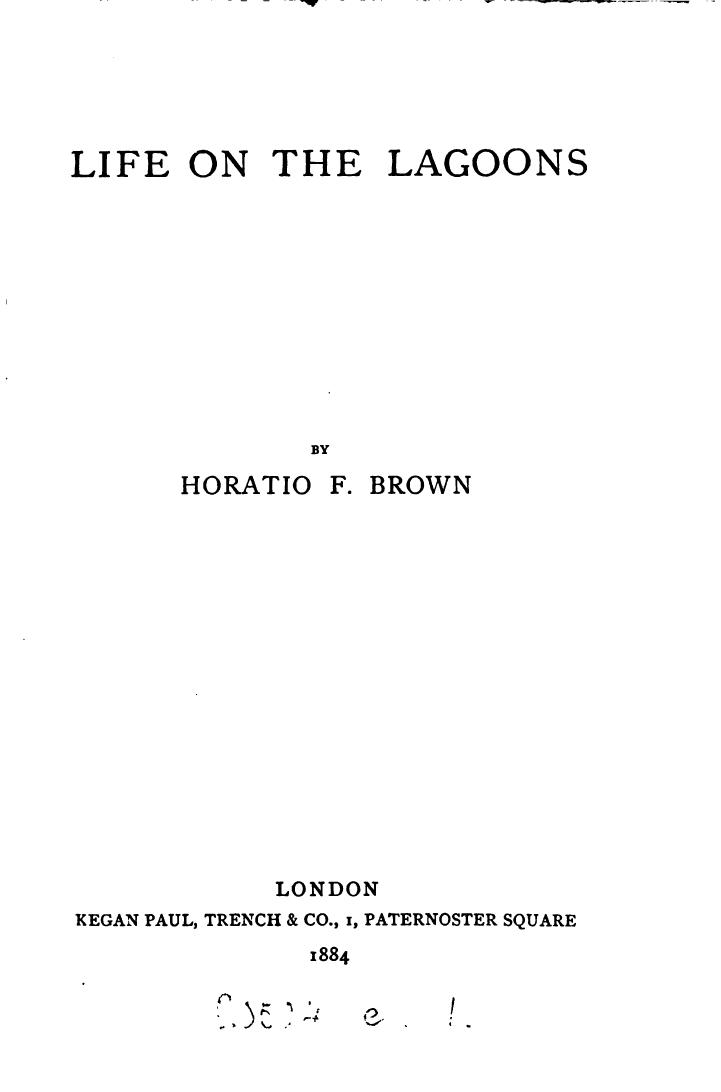
- Publisher: K. Paul, Trench & Company, 1884
- Publication date: 1886

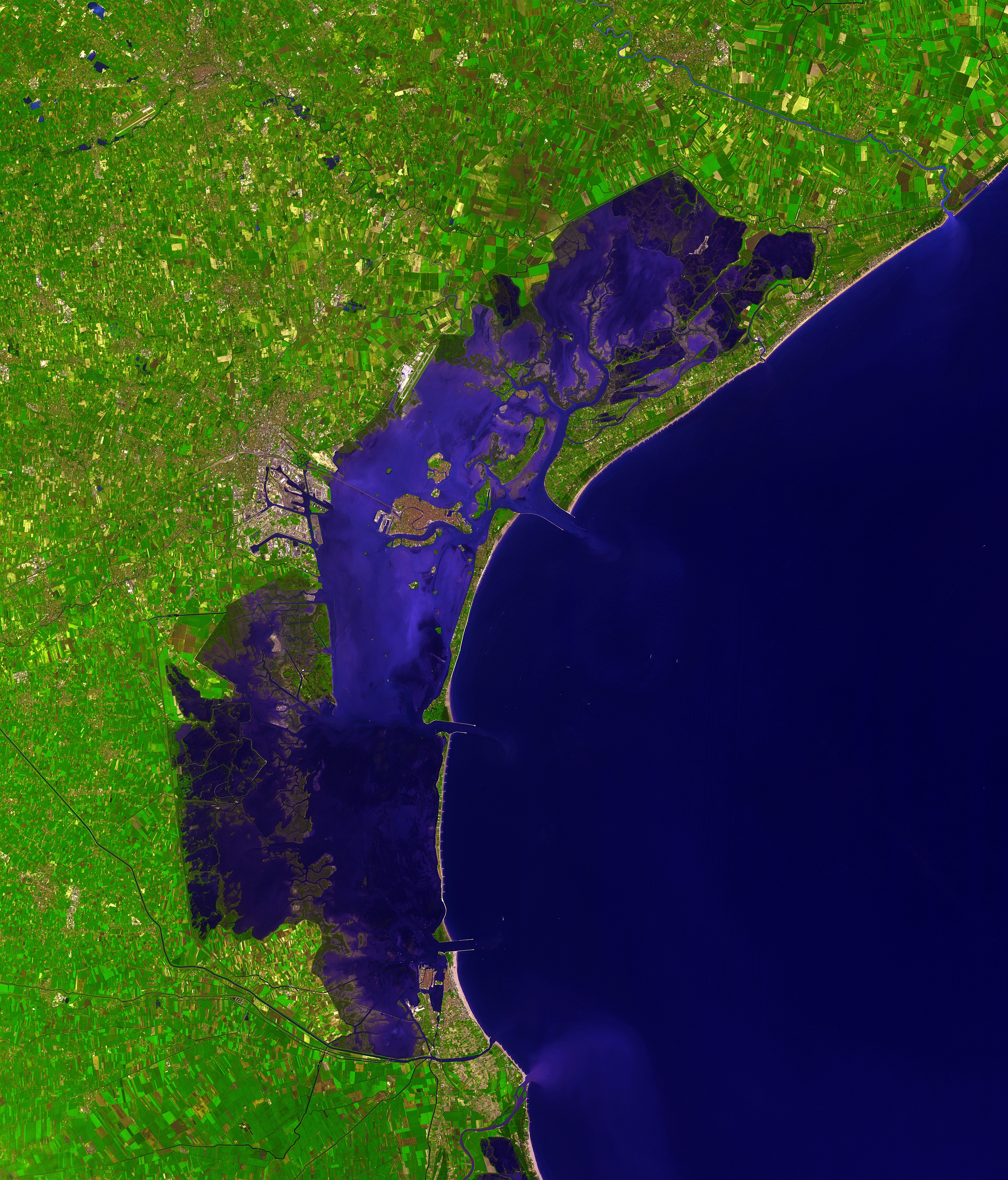
The Venetian Lagoon

Life on the Lagoons, which deals with the history and topography of the watery area around the city of Venice, is the first book by the Scottish historian Horatio Brown.

The first edition was published in London in 1884, a revised second edition appeared ten years later in 1894, and there were further editions in 1900, 1904, and 1909.

The book was republished as a paperback in 2008.

== Outline ==
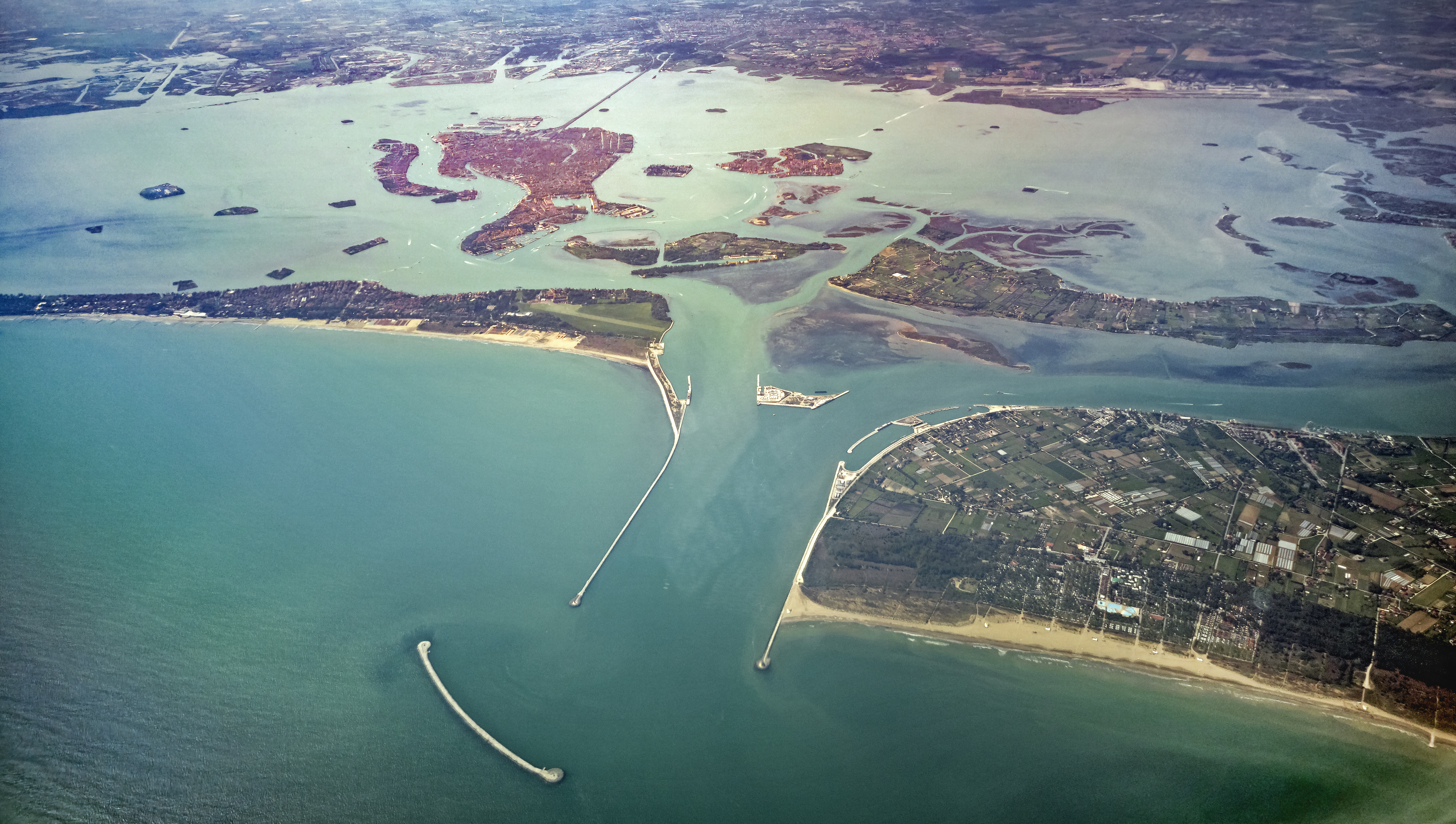
Aerial view of the Venetian Lagoon

Brown begins by setting out the natural topography of the lagoons, then their history from the year 452. He goes on to describe the human and animal life to be seen in and around the lagoons in his own day, based on his excursions, sometimes with his friend John Addington Symonds, in a sandolo called Fisole, which had orange sails decorated with a fleur-de-lis.

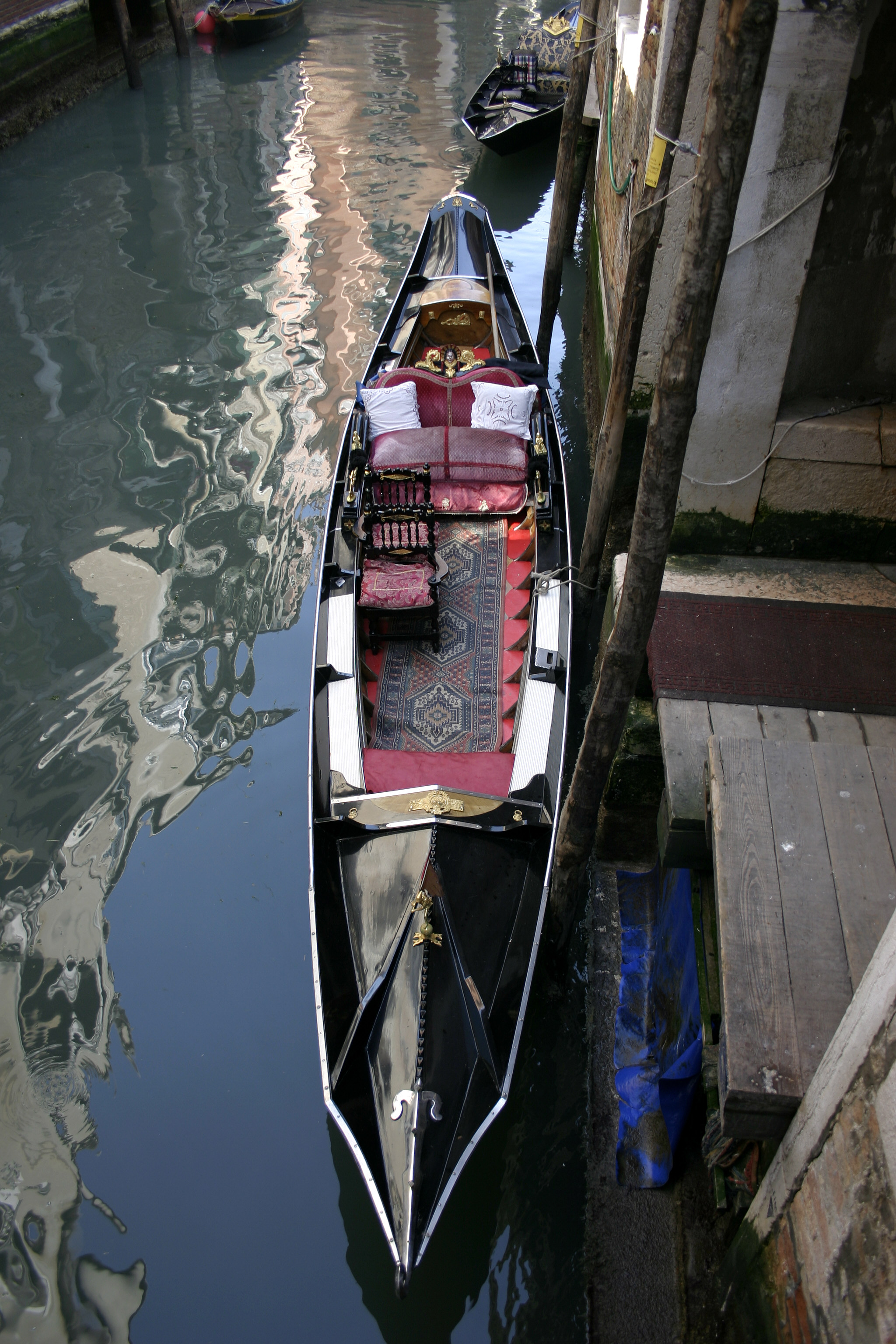
A sandolo

The book is dedicated "To my Gondolier, ANTONIO SALIN, my constant companion in Venice and Venetia".

The chapter-headings of the second edition are: The Lagoons : their Nature and their History; The Gondola; The Traghetti; A Gondolier's Bank; Floods in the City; The Casa degli Spiriti; Sant' Elena; Osele; Sails and Sailmaking; A Vision of La Sensa; Processions; San Nicolo del Lido; The Doves of Saint Mark; The Ducal Palace; All Souls; The Madonna della Salute; Home Life; Popular Beliefs; Popular Poetry; A Regatta and its Sequel; and Mi Chiama il Mare.

== Poem by Stevenson ==
Horatio Brown met Robert Louis Stevenson in 1881 at Davos, Switzerland, through their mutual friend John Addington Symonds. Stevenson took a liking to Brown and later sent him a copy of William Penn's Fruits of Solitude. Stevenson read Life on the Lagoons and wrote the poem "To H. F. Brown" to celebrate the book.

Now, thanks to your triumphant care,
Your pages clear as April air,
The sails, the bells, the birds, I know,
And the far-off Friulan snow

== Critical reception ==
The British Quarterly Review said of the first edition in 1884:

Mr. Brown is another illustration of the fascinating spell wherewith Venice enthrals all who fairly come within her influence. He has, too, found what, after all that has been written about Venice, one would have said was impossible, a distinct and unhackneyed form of Venetian life and exposition. The lagoons make up so large a portion of the life of the people, and the workers therein are necessarily so distinct, that in describing them Mr. Brown largely describes Venice. We advise readers to skip the proem, which is a rhapsody...

The Literary World said in 1894 of the second edition:

It is some time since we have had a book on Venice—that most tempting theme to European travel writers—and therefore there is a vacancy for Mr. Horatio F. Brown to fill with a second edition, revised... The formation of the lagoons is described in a most instructive, scientific chapter, and the story of Venice as a state and city is traced therein from the foundation down to the present time...

Charles Dudley Warner, in A Library of the World's Best Literature (1896) says:

Beginning where Nature began to hint at Venice, Mr Brown describes the peculiar topography of the region... When the reader knows the natural geography of Venice as if he had seen it, he may pass on and behold what man has done with the site since the year 452... a concise sketch of the history of Venice, from its early beginnings to the end of the Republic... These preliminaries gone through, he is free to play in the Venice of to-day. He may behold it all, from the palace of the Doges to the painted sails of the bragozzi. The fishing boats, the gondolas, the ferries, the churches, the fisheries, the floods, the islands across the lagoon, the pictures, the palaces, the processions and regattas, and saints' days, all have their chapters in this "spirited and happy book", as Stevenson called it.

== Editions ==
- Life on the Lagoons (London: Kegan Paul, Trench & Co., 1884), 1st edition
- Life on the Lagoons (New York: Macmillan, 1894), 2nd edition
- Life on the Lagoons (London: 1900), 3rd edition
- Life on the Lagoons (London: 1904), 4th edition
- Life on the Lagoons (London: Rivingtons, 1909), 5th edition
- Life on the Lagoons (London: Read Books, 2008), paperback, ISBN 978-1-4437-0765-7
