= John Bailey (critic) =

English literary critic (1864–1931)

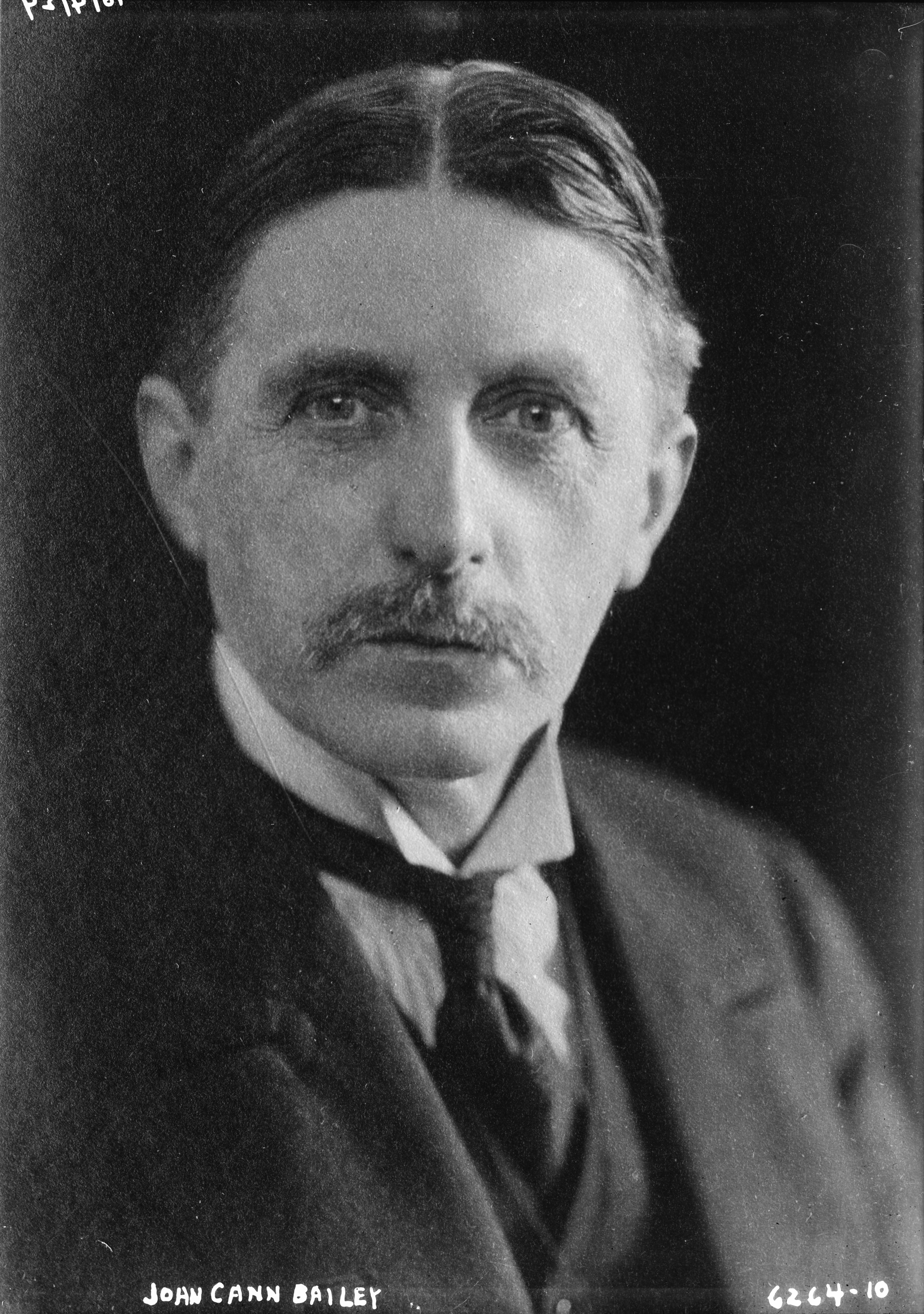
John Cann Bailey

John Cann Bailey (10 January 1864 – 29 June 1931) was an English literary critic, lecturer, and chairman of the National Trust.

After education at Haileybury College and New College, Oxford, Bailey qualified as a barrister, but did not practise law. He attempted unsuccessfully to enter politics, and later became a leading figure in the National Trust.

As a literary critic he wrote twelve books and many reviews in literary journals. He was assistant editor of The Quarterly Review, and chairman (later president) of the English Association.

== Life and career ==
Bailey was born in Wymondham, Norfolk, the third son of Elijah Crosier Bailey, a solicitor, and his wife, Jane Sarah née Cann. He was educated at Haileybury College and, from 1882 to 1886, at New College, Oxford, where he obtained a second class degree in classics. He made many friends in the literary and artistic circles of Oxford, and developed his love of fine arts and Greek and Latin classics.

He was called to the bar by the Inner Temple in 1892, but never practised law; he had a private income adequate to sustain him. He made an unsuccessful attempt to enter politics as a Conservative candidate, losing at parliamentary elections in 1895 and 1900. Among those elected to parliament at the first of these elections was Alfred Lyttelton, to whom Bailey was for a time assistant private secretary. In April 1900 he married Lyttelton's half-sister, Sarah Kathleen (1879–1941), the eldest daughter of the second marriage of George Lyttelton, 4th Baron Lyttelton. They had three daughters, the youngest of whom predeceased Bailey.

Bailey was a prominent member of the Literary Society, of which he eventually became president. He was also active in the affairs of the Johnson Society. His principal activity in public affairs was with the National Trust, of which he was chairman from 1923 until his death. The Times commented in 1931, "The strong position which the National Trust now occupies is largely due to him, and it will perhaps never be known how many generous gifts of rural beauty and historic interest the nation owes, directly or indirectly, to his persuasive enthusiasm."

Of Bailey's output as a literary critic, his biographer Algernon Cecil wrote:

Bailey's intense pleasure in good talk may possibly have restricted his literary output, but his literary ambition was always circumscribed. He related that when people asked him to write a magnum opus he used to counter by enquiring: "If I write it, will you buy it and will you read it?" It is arguable that his best work was, in fact, slight in compass. He himself may have rated highest his Milton (1915), a little book, but many of his contemporaries felt that Dr Johnson and his Circle (1913) gave his particular powers their fullest scope.

Bailey was deputy editor of The Quarterly Review, 1907–08 and 1909–10. He also wrote articles on literary subjects for The Edinburgh Review, The Fortnightly Review and other Reviews. A leading member of the English Association, he was its chairman from 1912 to 1915 and president from 1925 to 1926. He was a frequent lecturer on literature; among his appointments were those of Warton Lecturer to the British Academy, 1919; Clark Lecturer, Trinity College, Cambridge, 1921; Taylorian Lecturer in the University of Oxford, 1926; and Fry Lecturer to the University of Bristol, 1927.

During the First World War Bailey worked for British intelligence, where he was responsible for propaganda in France, Spain, and Italy. In 1918, transferred to the Foreign Office he was involved in the planning for the Paris peace conference. After the war he was a candidate for the chair of poetry at Oxford, but the election was won by H. W. Garrod.

Bailey died at his house in South Kensington, London, aged 67. He was buried at Wramplingham, Norfolk, near his birthplace.

== Publications ==
=== Articles ===
- Gifford, William; Coleridge, Sir John Taylor; Lockhart, John Gibson; Elwin, Whitwell; MacPherson, William; Smith, William; (Iv), Sir John Murray (January 1906). "Fanny Burney". The Quarterly Review. 204: 89–110.
- "John Evelyn". The Quarterly Review. 206: 516–535. April 1907.

=== Books ===
- Studies in Some Famous Letters, 1899
- An Anthology of English Elegies, 1899
- The Poems of William Cowper, 1905
- The Claims of French Poetry, 1907
- Poets and Poetry, 1911
- Dr Johnson and his Circle, 1913
- Milton, 1915
- A Day Book of Landor, 1919
- Some Political Ideas and Persons, 1921
- The Continuity of Letters, 1923
- Walt Whitman, 1926
- The Diary of Lady Frederick Cavendish (ed), 1927
- Shakespeare, 1929
