= Horatio Brown =

Scottish historian

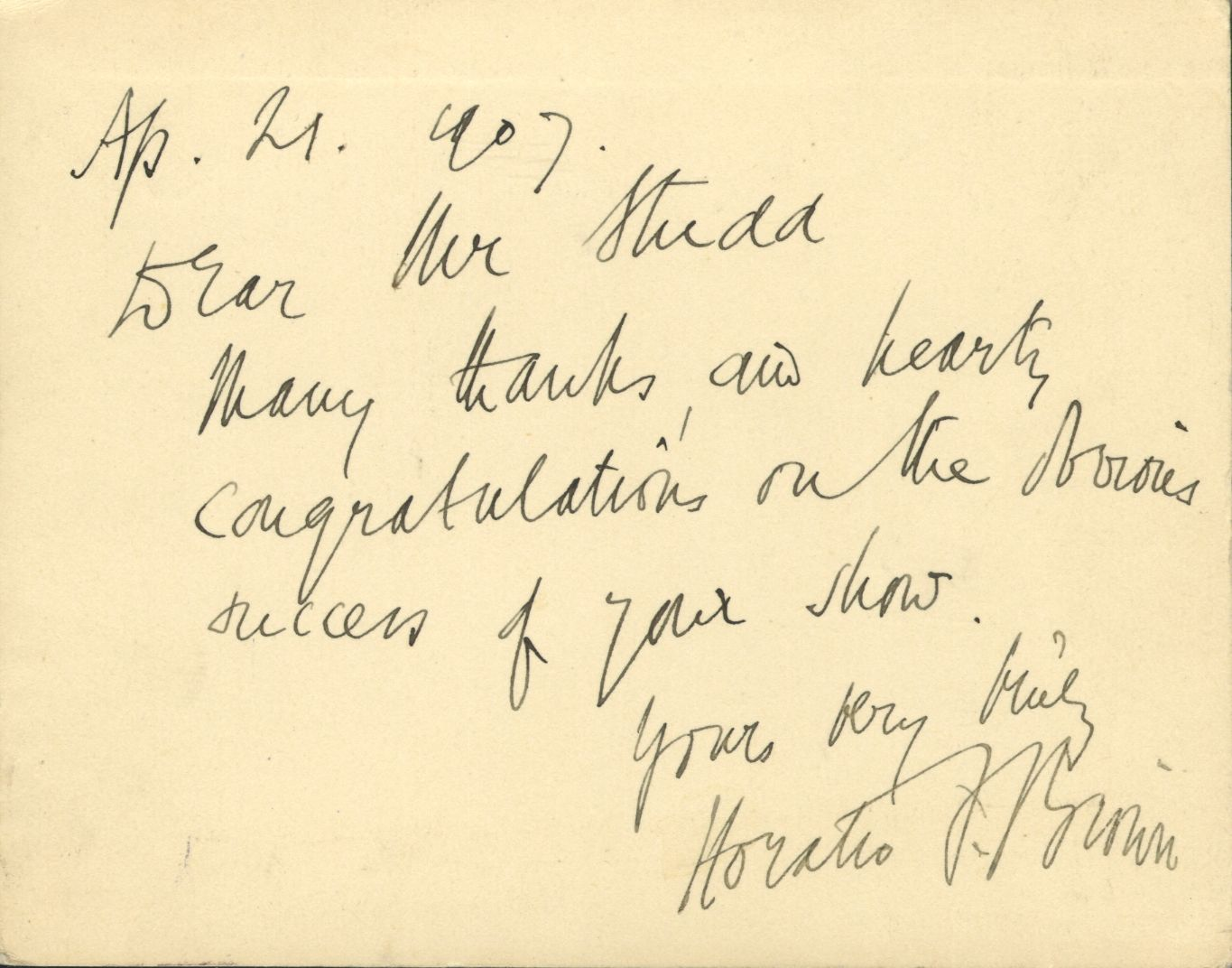
1907 autograph

Horatio Robert Forbes Brown (16 February 1854 – 19 August 1926) was a Scottish historian who specialized in the history of Venice and Italy.

Born in Nice, he grew up in Midlothian, Scotland, was educated in England at Clifton College and Oxford, and spent most of his life in Venice, publishing several books about the city. He also wrote for the Cambridge Modern History, was the biographer of John Addington Symonds, and was a poet and alpinist.

== Early life ==
Born at Nice (then part of the kingdom of Sardinia) on 16 February 1854, Brown was the son of Hugh Horatio Brown, an advocate, of New Hall House, Carlops, who was a Deputy Lieutenant for Midlothian, and of Gulielmina Forbes, the sixth daughter of Colonel Ranaldson MacDonnell of Glengarry and Clanranald (1773–1828). The marriage was in 1853, and his mother was a good deal younger than his father, who died on 17 October 1866, at the age of 66.

Brown's maternal grandfather, Ranaldson MacDonnell, of Invergarry Castle on Loch Oich in Inverness, Chief of Clan MacDonell of Glengarry, had been one of Walter Scott's closest friends.

His other grandfather was Robert Brown, Esq. (died 1834), of New Hall, Carlops, a large country house about twelve miles from the centre of Edinburgh, mostly dating from the 18th century but incorporating parts of a medieval castle. Enlargements to the house in 1785 were designed by Robert Brown, who later wrote a play called Mary's Bower and a book of Comic Poems in Scots. He was a lover of art, commissioning new work by Henry Raeburn, Andrew Geddes and John Watson Gordon.

Hugh and Gulielmina Brown had three sons, Horatio, Allan, and Chadwick, who were sent to Clifton College in 1864. After their father's death, Mrs. Brown moved to Bristol to be near her sons. At Clifton, Horatio was befriended by a young schoolmaster, John Addington Symonds, who lectured on the Greek poets and became an important influence on his life. From there, he went up to New College, Oxford, in 1873, in 1877 gaining second class honours in Greats, although he did not take his degree.

Brown spoke Italian, French, and German well and was also strong in classical Greek, while a contemporary later described him as "a fair-haired, breezy out-of-doors person with a crisp Highland-Scottish speech".

== Career ==
In 1877, the Brown family found itself in a bad financial position. Allan Brown emigrated to New South Wales, and a tenant was found for the family home in Midlothian, Newhall House. In 1879, Brown and his mother decided to live in Italy. They went first to Florence, where Gulielmina Brown's Forbes aunts lived, and then settled at Venice, taking an apartment in the Palazzo Balbi Valier on the Grand Canal.

In Venice, Brown met the archaeologist Giacomo Boni, who became his colleague in a common passion for the antiquities of Venice and of Italy. Brown became a leading figure in the English-speaking community, churchwarden of St George's Church in campo San Vio, president of the city's Cosmopolitan Hospital, and honorary treasurer of the Sailors' Institute. He also befriended local gondoliers and fishermen, helping them in their battles, gaining the material for a book of local colour, Life on the Lagoons, which appeared in 1884. The ailing Robert Louis Stevenson (whom Brown had met in 1881 at Symonds's house at Davos, Switzerland) read it and wrote the poem "To H. F. Brown" to celebrate "your spirited and happy book".

Symonds joined his friend Brown for holidays in Venice, when they liked to drift through the lagoons in Brown's sandolo, called Fisole, which had orange sails decorated with a fleur-de-lis, or to play tre sette or bocce.

In 1885, the Browns bought a tall, narrow, tenement building on the Zattere looking down the Giudecca Canal and reconstructed it as a house called Cà Torresella. Brown's close friend Antonio Salin, a gondolier, also lived in the house with his wife and family.

In 1889, Brown took a job. The late Rawdon Brown (no relation) had been working for the British government's Public Record Office on Venetian state papers in the Frari, concentrating on the reports of Venetian ambassadors at the Court of St James's. He died in 1883, and at first George Cavendish-Bentinck as Rawdon Brown's executor completed some of the unfinished work, but in 1889 the task of taking it further was given to Horatio Brown. From 1889 to 1905 he spent his mornings producing calendars covering the years from 1581 to 1613. In the afternoons he would go out and about with his gondolier, Salin. Brown's name as an historian was made by the five volumes of Calendar of State Papers (Venetian) which he published between 1895 and 1905.

The receptions he gave at home on Mondays were described by Frederick Rolfe, known as Baron Corvo.

An alpinist, Brown climbed peaks in Switzerland, the Carnic Alps and the Tyrol, and was a member of the Alpine Club of Venice.

He published Venetian Studies (1887), a historical miscellany, followed by a more comprehensive history, Venice, an Historical Sketch (1893), later abbreviated as The Venetian Republic (1902), and his The Venetian Printing Press (1891) came out of unpublished material he found in his researches at the Frari.

Lord Ronald Gower stayed with Brown in Venice in the 1890s and noted in his diary: "Every morning Horatio Brown goes to his work at the Archives, and I go a-sight-seeing." Brown spent part of the summer of 1895 staying with Gower in London, when they visited picture galleries together. In 1899, his portrait was painted by Henry Scott Tuke.

Brown's friend Symonds appointed him his literary executor, so that in 1893 when Symonds died Brown received all his private papers. He went on to publish John Addington Symonds, a Biography (1895), followed in 1923 by Letters and Papers of John Addington Symonds. In both, he suppressed almost all of Symonds's homosexuality, and in Brown's own Will he left orders for the destruction of the papers, apart from Symonds's autobiography, and that was not to be published for at least fifty years. In 1923, an equally discreet obituary of Frederick Rolfe was printed in the London Mercury, and Brown commented with sympathy: 'If it was necessary to modify concerning Rolfe – a freelance with no ties – imagine what I was forced to do in my John Addington Symonds books, with his daughters and their husbands insisting on seeing the MS before it was printed!"

Brown and Symonds admired the friar Paolo Sarpi and his maxim "I never tell a lie, but I do not tell the whole truth to everyone". In 1895, Brown gave the Taylorian Lecture in Oxford on Sarpi.

In 1901, Brown's brother Allan died in Australia. After the discovery of the Lacus Curtius in the Roman Forum in 1903, Brown was invited to go to Rome to pour a libation.

Studies in the History of Venice (1907) was Brown's most significant work. He also wrote two chapters of the Cambridge Modern History, and in the early 1920s a chapter of the Cambridge Medieval History. The University of Edinburgh gave him the honorary degree of doctor of law, the British Academy a gold medal, and the king of Italy honoured him with the rank of cavaliere.

Brown published some homoerotic poems in his collection Drift (1900), but was hostile to the Uranian writers in the circle of Edward Carpenter, and because of his suppression of the truth about Symonds they saw him as a hindrance to homosexual emancipation.

His mother died in 1909, and Brown began to spend the summers in Midlothian, staying at the inn of Penicuik or with his friend Lord Rosebery, a former prime minister. During the Great War he stayed in Venice, and when the Austrians seemed likely to capture the city he moved to Florence, then home to Scotland, where he lived between the New club in Edinburgh and his home village of Carlops. After the war he went back to Venice, but his eyesight was getting poor, his income was lower, and he sold most of his Venetian house, keeping an apartment. In March 1925 he had a heart attack, but recovered. A final book, Dalmatia, appeared in 1925, copiously illustrated by Walter Tyndale.

Brown had now sold the Newhall estate, and he died of heart failure on 19 August 1926 aged 72 at Belluno, where he had gone to escape the summer heat. He was cremated on San Michele, earlier the final resting place of his friend Symonds. His estate at death was £6,117, a substantial sum.

Brown's friend and fellow-historian Frederick York Powell described him as "Horatio Brown, the Venetian historian, a real good sort, cheery, broad-faced, shock-headed, tumble-dressed", while after his death The Cornhill Magazine called him a "Scotch laird, with his ruddy countenance, muscular limbs, and sturdy frame".

== Works ==
- Life on the Lagoons (London: 1884; 5th edition by Rivingtons, 1909
- Venetian studies (London: Kegan Paul, Trench & co., 1887)
- The Venetian printing press, 1469–1800 (London: John Nimmo, 1891)
- Venice: an historical sketch of the Republic (London: Rivington Percival, 1893; 2nd edition, 1895), 434 pp.
- Calendar of State Papers (Venetian): 1581–1591, 1895
- Calendar of State Papers (Venetian): 1592–1603, 1897
- Calendar of State Papers (Venetian): 1603–1607, 1900
- Calendar of State Papers (Venetian): 1607–1610, 1904
- Calendar of State Papers (Venetian): 1610–1613, 1905
- John Addington Symonds: a Biography (1895)
- Drift: verses (London: G. Richards, 1900)
- Temple Primer: The Venetian Republic (London: R. Clay & sons, 1902)
- Venice, chapter 8 of Cambridge Modern History vol. I The Renaissance (1902)
- Bracciano, Viterbo, Toscanella (1904)
- In and Around Venice (1905)
- The Valtelline (1603–39), chapter 2 of Cambridge Modern History vol. IV The Thirty Years War (1906)
- Pensieri persi, in Die Festschrift des Herren Prälat Schneider (1906)
- Molmenti's Venice, translation of vols. 1, 2, 3 and 4 (1907)
- Studies in the history of Venice (London: John Murray, 1907)
- Introduction to The Poems of T. E. Brown (Golden Treasury series, 1908
- Molmenti's Venice, translation of vols. 5 and 6 (1908)
- Letters and Papers of John Addington Symonds (1923)
- Cambridge Medieval History, vol. 4, chapter 8 (1923)
- Dalmatia: painted by Walter Tyndale, described by Horatio F. Brown (London: A. & C. Black, 1925)

== Honours ==
- Cavaliere of the Kingdom of Italy
- Honorary degree of Doctor of law (LL.D.), University of Edinburgh, 1900
- Member of the Ateneo Veneto
- Gold medal of the British Academy
- Taylorian Lecturer, 1895
