= The Author of Beltraffio =

Book by Henry James

- Short story by Henry James
- Country: United Kingdom
- Language: English

Publication
- Published in: English Illustrated Magazine
- Publication type: Periodical
- Media type: Print (magazine)
- Publication date: June–July 1884
- Pages: 21

"The Author of Beltraffio" is a short story by Henry James, first published in the English Illustrated Magazine in 1884. This macabre account of desperate family infighting eventually leads to a tragic conclusion. Although the father in the story is a novelist, the tale concentrates far more on his family relationships than on his special concerns as a writer, though some of those concerns affect the outcome.

== Plot summary ==
The narrator of the story, a somewhat naive American admirer of English novelist Mark Ambient, visits the writer at his home in Surrey. The narrator is very enthusiastic about Ambient's work, especially his latest novel Beltraffio. He meets Ambient's beautiful but chilly wife, his sickly seven-year-old son Dolcino, and his strange sister Gwendolyn. He also learns that Ambient's wife strongly dislikes her husband's novels and considers them corrupt and pagan.

Dolcino eventually becomes much more ill. In order to "protect" him from what she sees as the baleful influence of his father, Ambient's wife withholds the boy's medicine. Dolcino dies, and the details of his mother's conduct are told to the narrator by Gwendolyn. The mother, grief-stricken over her role in Dolcino's final illness, dies herself after a few months. In a grimly ironic note to conclude the story, the narrator says Ambient later revealed that his wife had become partially reconciled to his novels and even read Beltraffio in the weeks before her death.

== Key themes ==
When James was mulling over this story in his Notebooks, he wondered if the tale would be "too gruesome" and "too unnatural." The double dose of mortality at the end of the story may seem extreme, but James narrates events so smoothly—even with touches of humor, especially about Ambient's bizarre, arty sister—that readers may accept the catastrophe as perhaps not inevitable but somewhat believable.

In the Notebooks James said he based the story on the real-life marriage of John Addington Symonds, an English art historian, poet, and proponent of homosexuality who was constantly quarreling with his very proper wife. The contrast of an esthetic point of view, carried "even to morbidness" (to use James's own words), with a more rigid, traditionalist stance creates the story's intense atmosphere of conflict. The tragic outcome might seem perverse and even silly when considered as part of a supposedly realistic story. But at least James prepares thoroughly for the conclusion with an extensive treatment of the discord in the Ambients' marriage.

== Critical evaluation ==
Critic Robert Gale, in an odd echo of James' own comments in the Notebooks, called this story "morbid," and that verdict has found some agreement among other critics. Most commentators concede that James narrates the harsh events powerfully, and that he makes the conclusion as convincing as anybody could. Ambient's weird sister has also been much appreciated as a clever satire on the self-consciously "artistic" personality.

The crux for the reader is whether Ambient's wife is really capable of showing such disregard for her son's suffering, in a wildly misguided belief that the boy is better off dead than corrupted by his father's influence. While Mrs. Ambient is shown as rather cold and overly prim, she may not be convincing as such a monster to her own child. The reservations that James himself expressed about the tale's "unnatural" plot might be all too valid.

== Adaptation ==
The Author of Beltraffio was adapted into a 1974 French television film directed by Tony Scott and starring Tom Baker.
