= Taylorian Lecture =

Lecture at the University of Oxford

The Taylorian Lecture, sometimes referred to as the "Special Taylorian Lecture" or "Taylorian Special Lecture", is a prestigious annual lecture on Modern European Literature, delivered at the Taylor Institution in the University of Oxford since 1889.

== 1889-1899 ==
The first eleven lectures were published collectively in 1900, under the title Studies in European Literature, being the Taylorian Lectures 1889—1899:

- 1889: Edward Dowden, “Literary Criticism in France”
- 1890: Walter Pater, “Prosper Mérimée”
- 1891: W. M. Rossetti, “Leopardi”
- 1892: T. W. Rolleston, “Lessing and Modern German Literature”
- 1893 (delivered 1894): Stéphane Mallarmé, “La musique et les lettres” (Music and Literature)
- 1894: Alfred Morel-Fatio, “L'Espagne du Don Quijote”
- 1895: H. R. F. Brown, “Paolo Sarpi”
- 1896 (delivered 1897): Paul Bourget, “Gustave Flaubert”
- 1897: C. H. Herford, “Goethe’s Italian Journey”
- 1898: Henry Butler Clarke, “The Spanish Rogue-Story”
- 1899 (delivered 1900): W. P. Ker, “Boccaccio”

== 1900-1920 ==
Further lectures were delivered in the first few years of the 20th century, but were not published collectively:

- 1900: Émile Verhaeren, "La poésie française actuelle"
- 1901: Arthur Anthony Macdonell, "The Wit and Pathos of Heinrich Heine"
- 1902: James Fitzmaurice-Kelly, “Lope De Vega and Spanish Drama”
- 1903: Henry Calthrop Hollway-Calthrop, “Francesco Petrarcha”
- 1904: George Saintsbury, “Théophile Gautier: a French Man of Letters of All Work”

== 1920-1930 ==
In 1917 a new endowment for an annual lecture on "subjects connected to Modern European Literature" was established by a donation of War Stock by Professors Charles Firth and Joseph Wright. This second series of lectures began in 1920. In 1930 a further volume of lectures was published, from the years 1920-1930, under the title Studies in European Literature, being the Taylorian Lectures Second Series, 1920—1930:

- 1920: Edmund Gosse, “Malherbe and the Classical Reaction in the Seventeenth Century”
- 1921: Francis Yvon Eccles, “Racine in England”
- 1922: Sir Henry Thomas, “Shakespeare and Spain”
- 1923: Edmund Garratt Gardner, “Tommaso Campanella and His Poetry”
- 1924: John George Robertson, “The Gods of Greece in German Poetry”
- 1925: Émile Legouis, “G. G. de Beaurieu et son Élève de la nature, 1763”
- 1926: John Cann Bailey, “Carducci”
- 1927: H. A. L. Fisher, “Paul Valéry”
- 1928: Abraham Flexner, “The Burden of Humanism”
- 1929: Oliver Elton, “Chekhov”
- 1930: Percy Ewing Matheson, “German Visitors to England, 1770-1795, and their impressions”

== Since 1930 ==
Since 1930 no collected volume has been issued, but individual lectures include:

- 1931: Hilaire Belloc, “On Translation”
- 1932 (delivered 1933): George S. Gordon, “St. Evremond”
- 1933: Geoffrey Langdale Bickersteth, “Form, Tone, and Rhythm in Italian Poetry”
- 1934: Mario Roques, “La poésie Roumaine contemporaine”
- 1935: H. W. Garrod, “Tolstoi's Theory of Art”
- 1936: Herbert John Clifford Grierson, “Two Dutch Poets”
- 1937: Sir William Alexander Craigie, “The Art of Poetry in Iceland”
- 1938: Ernest Hoepffner, “Aux origines de la nouvelle française”
- 1939: Edgar Allison Peers, “Antonio Machado”
- 1942: Alf Sommerfelt, “The Written and Spoken Word in Norway”
- 1943: Stanisław Stroński, “La poésie et la réalité aux temps des troubadours” (Poetry and reality at the time of the troubadours)
- 1944: Pieter Sjoerds Gerbrandy, “National and International stability: Althusius, Grotius, van Vollenhoven”
- 1945: Richard McGillivray Dawkins, “The Nature of the Cypriot Chronicle of Leontios Makhairas”
- 1946: H. J. Chaytor, “The Provençal Chanson de Geste”
- 1947: Leonard Ashley Willoughby, “Unity and Continuity in Goethe”
- 1948: John Orr, “The Impact of French upon English”
- 1949: Thomas Mann, “Goethe und die Demokratie”
- 1951: Jean Sarrailh, “La crise religieuse en Espagne à la fin du XVIIIe siècle”
- 1952: Bruno Migliorini, “The Contribution of the Individual to Language”
- 1953: Charles Bruneau, “La prose littéraire de Proust à Camus”
- 1954: Francis Bull, “Ibsen: The Man and the Dramatist”
- 1955: Sir Harold Idris Bell, “The Nature of Poetry as Conceived by the Welsh Bards”
- 1957: Frederick Charles Roe, “Sir Thomas Urquhart and Rabelais”
- 1959: Elizabeth Mary Wilkinson, “Schiller, Poet or Philosopher?”
- 1961: Cecil Maurice Bowra, “Poetry and the First World War”
- 1966: Edward M. Wilson, “Some Aspects of Spanish Literary History” (published 1967)
- 1967: Charles Ralph Boxer, “Some Literary Sources for the History of Brazil in the Eighteenth Century”
- 1968: Walter Höllerer, “Elite und Utopie: Zum 100. Geburtstag Stefan Georges” (published 1969)
- 1971: Carlo Dionisotti, “Europe in Sixteenth-Century Italian Literature”
- 1974: Harry Levin, “Ezra Pound, T. S. Eliot and the European Horizon” (published 1975)
- 1978: R. A. Leigh, “Rousseau and the Problem of Tolerance in the Eighteenth Century”
- 1983: P. E. Russell, “Prince Henry the Navigator: The Rise and Fall of a Culture Hero” (published 1984)
- 1987: Paul Preston, “Salvador de Madariaga and the Quest for Liberty in Spain”
- 1992: Barry Ife, “The New World and the Literary Imagination”
- 2008: Jeffrey Hamburger, “Representations of Reading – Reading Representations: The Female Reader from the Hedwig Codex to Châtillon’s Léopoldine au Livre d’Heures”
- 2009: Maria de Fátima Silva, “Returning to the Classics in Contemporary Portuguese Drama (with special reference to Hélia Correia’s dramatic works)”
- 2009: Pedro Manuel Cátedra, "Uso y usos de la literatura en la Edad Media española"
- 2010: Lina Bolzoni, “Of Poetry, Poets and the Magic of Mirrors in the Renaissance”
- 2019: Yanis Varoufakis, "Realistic Utopias versus Dystopic Realities: Reflections on writing about an alternative economic present."
