= Carlo Orsi =

Italian painter

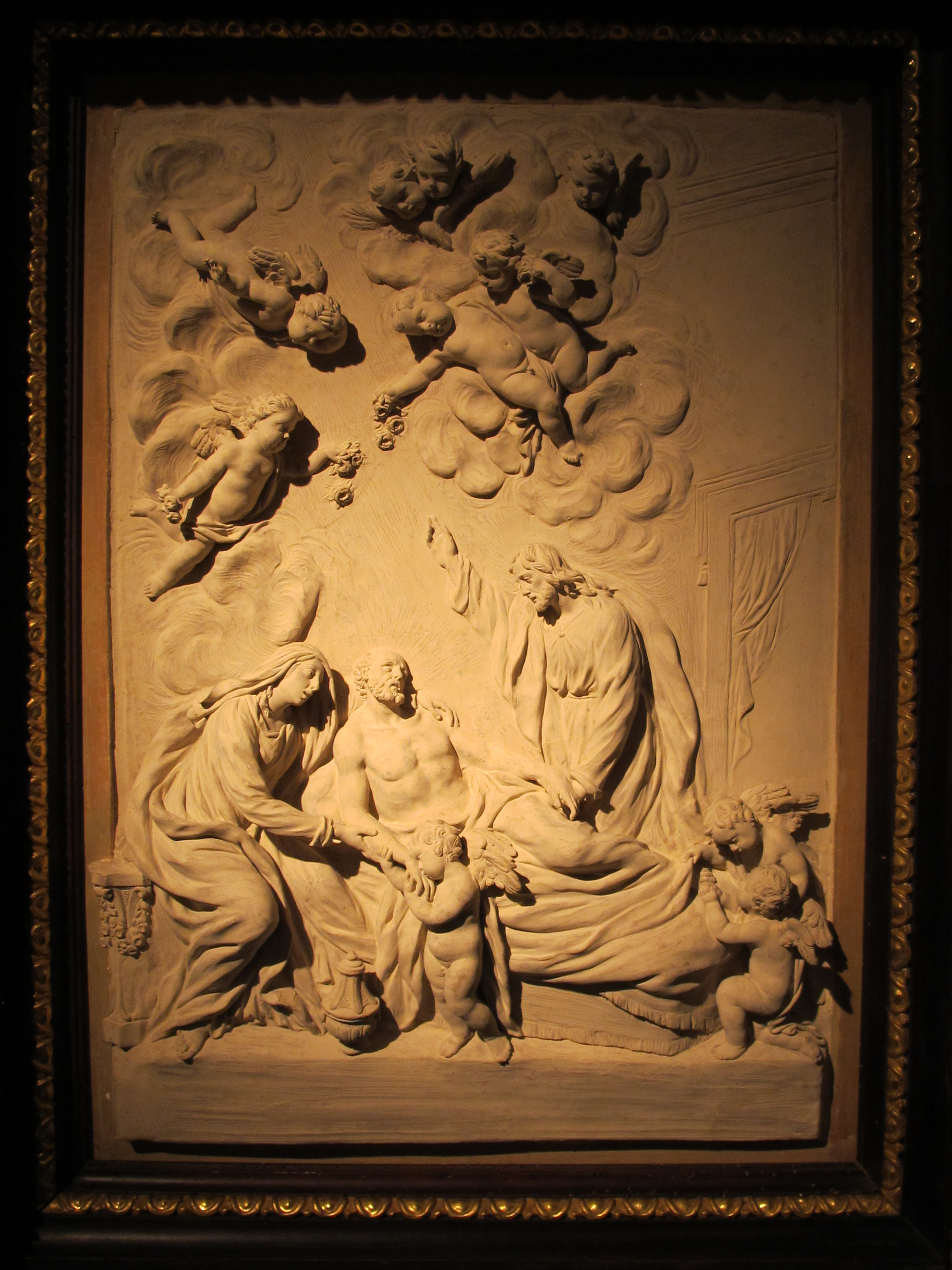
Death of Saint Joseph

Carlo Orsi (Pavia – London, 1894) was an Italian painter and sculptor active during the second half of the nineteenth century. He worked primarily in Florence and participated in several Italian exhibitions during the 1880s. His work included easel painting, portraiture, and decorative frescoes for religious and civic buildings.

== Biography ==
He was a resident of Florence. In 1884 at the Exposition of Turin, he displayed: Ore calde; in 1887 at Venice: a painting on porcelain; in 1886 at Florence: Avanzi di un' antica villa presso Lastra a Signa; Vendemmiatrice; Il porto di Rapallo; Prime note. Finally at the 1889 Exhibition of Florence: Imitazione arazzo. In 1885 he painted: I polli del l'augure. He also painted fresco murals at the church of the Consolata of Vigevano and the Palazzo Carignano of Turin. The Royal Academy of London has a portrait of John Addington Symonds, by Carlo Orsi.

== Exhibitions ==
Orsi participated in several public exhibitions in Italy during the 1880s. At the Esposizione Nazionale di Torino in 1884, he presented the painting Ore calde. Two years later, at an exhibition in Florence, he showed several works including Avanzi di un'antica villa presso Lastra a Signa, Vendemmiatrice, Il porto di Rapallo, and Prime note.

In 1887, he exhibited in Venice, where he presented a painting executed on porcelain, demonstrating the interest many artists of the period had in decorative media. At a later exhibition in Florence in 1889, he displayed the work Imitazione d’arazzo, reflecting contemporary interest in decorative styles inspired by historical textiles.

== Portraiture ==
Orsi also produced portraits. Among the works attributed to him is a portrait of the English writer and critic John Addington Symonds, which is held by the Royal Academy of Arts in London. The presence of this work in a British collection reflects the cultural connections between Italian artists and the international artistic and intellectual circles of the late nineteenth century.
