= Henry Butler Clarke =

- Born: 9 November 1863; Marchington
- Died: 10 September 1904 (aged 40); Torquay
- Occupation: academic
- Writing career
- Notable works: Modern Spain, 1815-1898

Henry Butler Clarke (9 November 1863 — 10 September 1904) was a lecturer on Spanish at the University of Oxford's Taylor Institution from 1890 to 1894, and an author of books about Spanish literature and history. His best-known work is Modern Spain, 1815-1898, published posthumously in 1906.

== Life ==
Clarke was partly raised in Saint-Jean-de-Luz, on the French-Spanish border, where his father was Anglican chaplain. He studied at the University of Oxford, and in 1890 was appointed lecturer on Spanish at the Taylor Institution. He resigned as a lecturer for reasons of health in 1894, but remained Fereday Fellow of St John's College, Oxford, and continued to write and research. In 1898 he was invited to give the annual Taylorian Lecture, choosing as his subject the picaresque novel. He died in Torquay in 1904.

After his death, the portion of his library acquired by St John's College was catalogued by Fernando de Arteaga y Pereira, Taylorian Teacher of Spanish, who also revised Clarke's Spanish Grammar for Schools for a second edition in 1914.

== Works ==
- A First Spanish Reader and Writer. London: Swan Sonnenschein & Co., 1891. Available at Internet Archive.
- A Spanish grammar for schools based on the principles and requirements of the Grammatical Society. London: Swan Sonnenschein, 1892. Reprinted 1909. Second edition (edited by Fernando de Arteaga y Pereira) 1914.
- Spanish Literature: An Elementary Handbook. London: Swan, Sonnenschein and Co., 1893. Reprinted 1921, 1970. Available at Internet Archive.
- Lazarillo de Tormes. Oxford: B. H. Blackwell, 1897.
- The Cid Campeador and the Waning of the Crescent in the West. In the series "Heroes of the Nations". New York: G.P. Putnam's Sons, 1897. Reprinted 1978. Available at Internet Archive.
- "The Catholic Kings", in Cambridge Modern History, vol.1, 1902, chapter XI. Available at Internet Archive.
- Modern Spain, 1815-1898, 1906. Reprinted 1969. Partial preview on Google Books.
- "The Spanish Gipsy. Edited with critical essay and notes by H. Butler Clarke", in Charles Mills Gayley (ed.), Representative English Comedies, vol. 3. London: Macmillan, 1914.

== Sources ==
- Obituary in the Chicago Daily Tribune, Oct. 6, 1904.
- Rev. W.H. Hutton, "Memoir", prefaced to Modern Spain (1906).
- Article (in Spanish) by Dra. Matilde Gallardo about the Taylor Institute.
