= James Fitzmaurice-Kelly =

British writer on Spanish literature

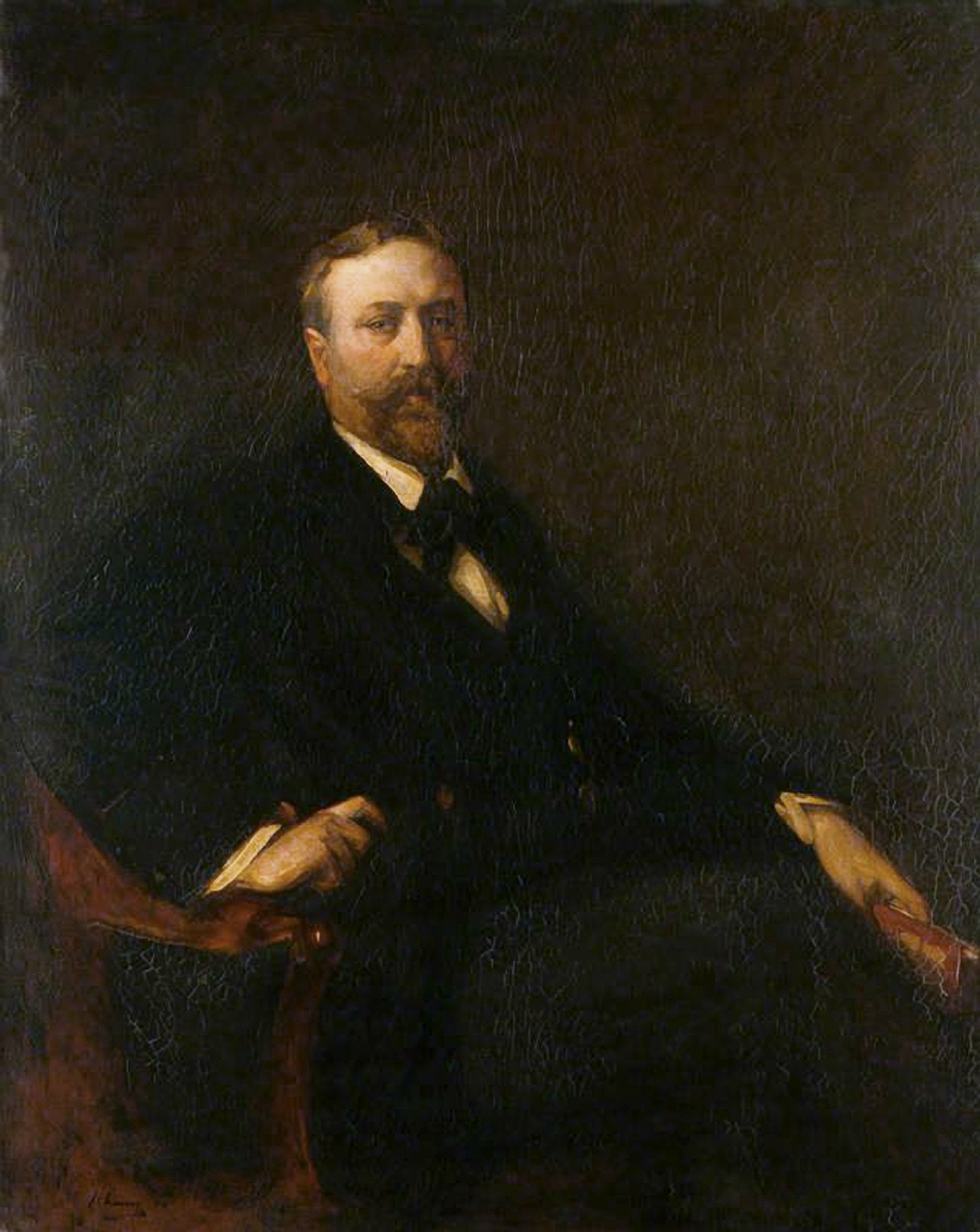
Portrait of Fitzmaurice-Kelly by John Lavery, 1898

James Fitzmaurice-Kelly FBA (1858 – 30 November 1923) was a British writer on Spanish literature.

== Early life ==
Born in Glasgow, he was the son of Colonel Thomas Kelly of the 40th Regiment of Foot and was educated at St Charles's College, Kensington, where he learned Spanish from a fellow pupil and taught himself to read Don Quixote. Obtaining work in 1885 as a tutor in Jerez de la Frontera to Buenaventura Misa y Busheroy, the son of the I Count of Bayona, later the Marquis of Misa.

== Writing career ==
In Madrid, he started the first version of his biography on Miguel de Cervantes. Around 1886, he met Ambassador Juan Valera, politician and war journalist Gaspar Núñez de Arce, and other important poets and intellectuals. He wrote on Hispanic culture subjects for The Spectator, Athenæum and Pall Mall Gazette. Returning to England, he established his reputation on Spanish literature through his reviews and articles for London periodicals. His History of Spanish Literature was published in 1898 and confirmed his reputation.

In 1898 he published his Historia de la literatura española in the Literatures of the World book series under Edmund Gosse. He was a Taylor Lecturer at Oxford University from 1902 and was invited to the United States in 1907 to deliver speeches at the Hispanic Society of America and several American Universities such as Harvard University and Yale University. From 1909 to 1916 he was a professor at the University of Liverpool and taught a special course at Cambridge University in 1916. He was a Cervantes Catedra Professor at London University till his retirement in 1920. Elected in 1906 a Fellow of the British Academy, he was miembro correspondiente of the Real Academia Española, the Real Academia de la Historia, and the Academia de Buenas Letras de Barcelona, as well as a Knight Commander of the Order of Alfonso XII. In 1916 Fitzmaurice-Kelly gave the inaugural Master-Mind Lecture, on Cervantes and Shakespeare.

He contributed on Spanish literature to the Encyclopædia Britannica Eleventh Edition, to the Cambridge Modern History, to Homenaje a Menendez y Pelayo, etc.

== Works ==
He edited and/or introduced:

- The History of Don Quixote of The Mancha: Translated from the Spanish of Miguel De Cervantes by Thomas Shelton: Annis 1612, 1620 (1896)
- The Complete Works of Cervantes (1901- )
- Don Quixote, with John Ormsby (1899–1900)
- The Course of Revolution in Spain and Portugal, 1845-71, in Cambridge Modern History, vol. XI The Growth of Nationalities (1909)
- Oxford Book of Spanish Verse (1913)
- Samaniego's Fabulas en verso (1917)
- Iriarte's Fabulas Literarias (1917)
- Garcilaso de la Vega's Eglogas (1918)
- Poesias varias (1918)
- Cambridge Readings in Spanish Literature (1920)
- The Rogue; or, The Life of Guzman de Alfarache. Written in Spanish by Matheo Aleman and done into English by James Mabbe, anno 1623 (1924)

He wrote:

- Life of Miguel de Cervantes Saavedra (1892)
- A history of Spanish Literature (1898; In Spanish, 1901; in French, 1904; second edition in French, 1913)
- Lope de Vega and Spanish Drama - The Taylorian Lecture (1902)
- Cervantes in England (1905)
- Chapters on Spanish Literature (1908)
- The Nun Ensign, Translated from the Spanish with an Introduction and Notes by James Fritzmaurice-Kelly also La Monja Alférez - A Play in the Original Spanish by Juan Perez de Montalban (1908)
- Miguel de Cervantes Saavedra: A Memoir (1913)
- Bibliographie de l'histoire de la littérature espagnole (1913)
- Cervantes and Shakespeare (1916)
- Gongora (1918)
- Fray Luis de Leon (1921)
- Spanish Literature Primer (1922)

== Death ==
He died at his house in Sydenham, Kent, on 30 November 1923 and was cremated and interred at West Norwood Cemetery on 4 December.
