= Rawdon Brown =

British antiquarian (1806–1883)

Rawdon Lubbock Brown (25 Jan 1806 in London – 25 August 1883 in Venice) was a British antiquarian.

== Life ==
He was born in London, the second child of Hugh William Brown and Anna Eliza Lubbock. He was baptised on 20 Feb 1806 at St James Church in Westminster. He spent most of his life at Venice in the study of Italian history, especially in its relation to English history. He came to Venice in 1833 to find the gravestone of Thomas Mowbray, the banished Duke of Norfolk mentioned in Shakespeare's play Richard II. In 1838, he bought the Palazzo Dario, but sold it four years later due to lack of funds. In 1852, he moved into the Palazzo Gussoni-Grimani-della Vida, which was his home until his death. John Ruskin met him in Venice and had an uneven friendship with him.

He died at Venice on 25 Aug. 1883, and was buried in the Lido cemetery three days later.

== Work ==
His great work, to which he gave some twenty years and for which he received £200 per year, was done for the British government, by scavenging the Archives of Venice for reports written by the Venetian Ambassadors to England. He aggregated these reports to create the publication: A Calendar of State Papers and Manuscripts relating to English Affairs existing in the Archives of Venice and Northern Italy. This was unfinished when Brown died at Venice in 1883, but some further work was done on it by his executor George Cavendish-Bentinck, before in 1889 the completion of the work was taken over by Horatio Brown (no relation).

== Works ==
- Four Years at the Court of Henry VIII, 2 vols (London, 1854), letters of the Venetian ambassador Sebastian Giustinian
- Calendar of State Papers in the Archives of Venice (6 volumes, published 1864–1886)

Attribution

- This article incorporates text from a publication now in the public domain: Lee, Sidney (1886). "Brown, Rawdon Lubbock". In Stephen, Leslie (ed.). Dictionary of National Biography. Vol. 7. London: Smith, Elder & Co.
