= Sandolo =

Traditional, flat-bottomed Venetian rowing boat

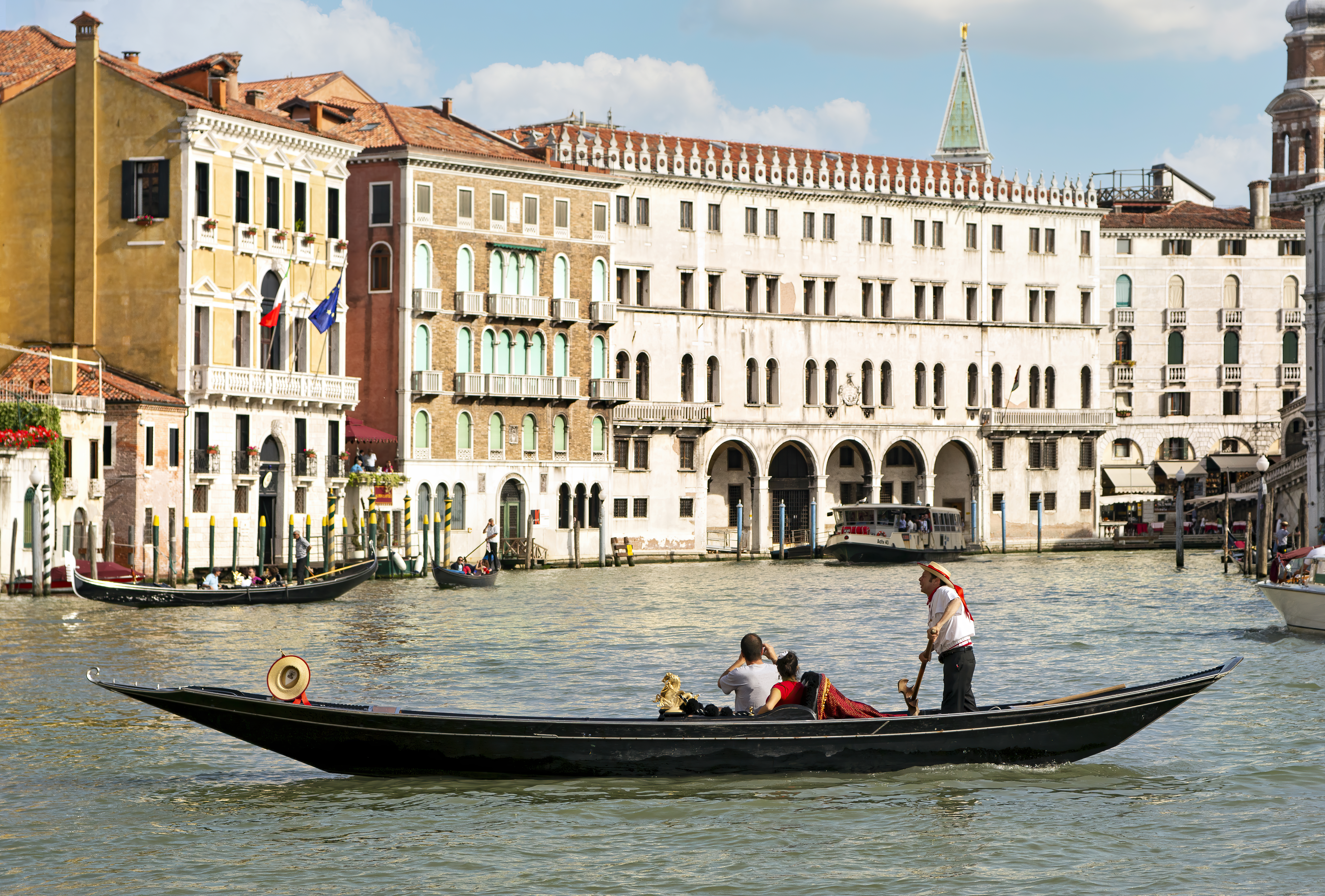
Sandolo in Canal Grande

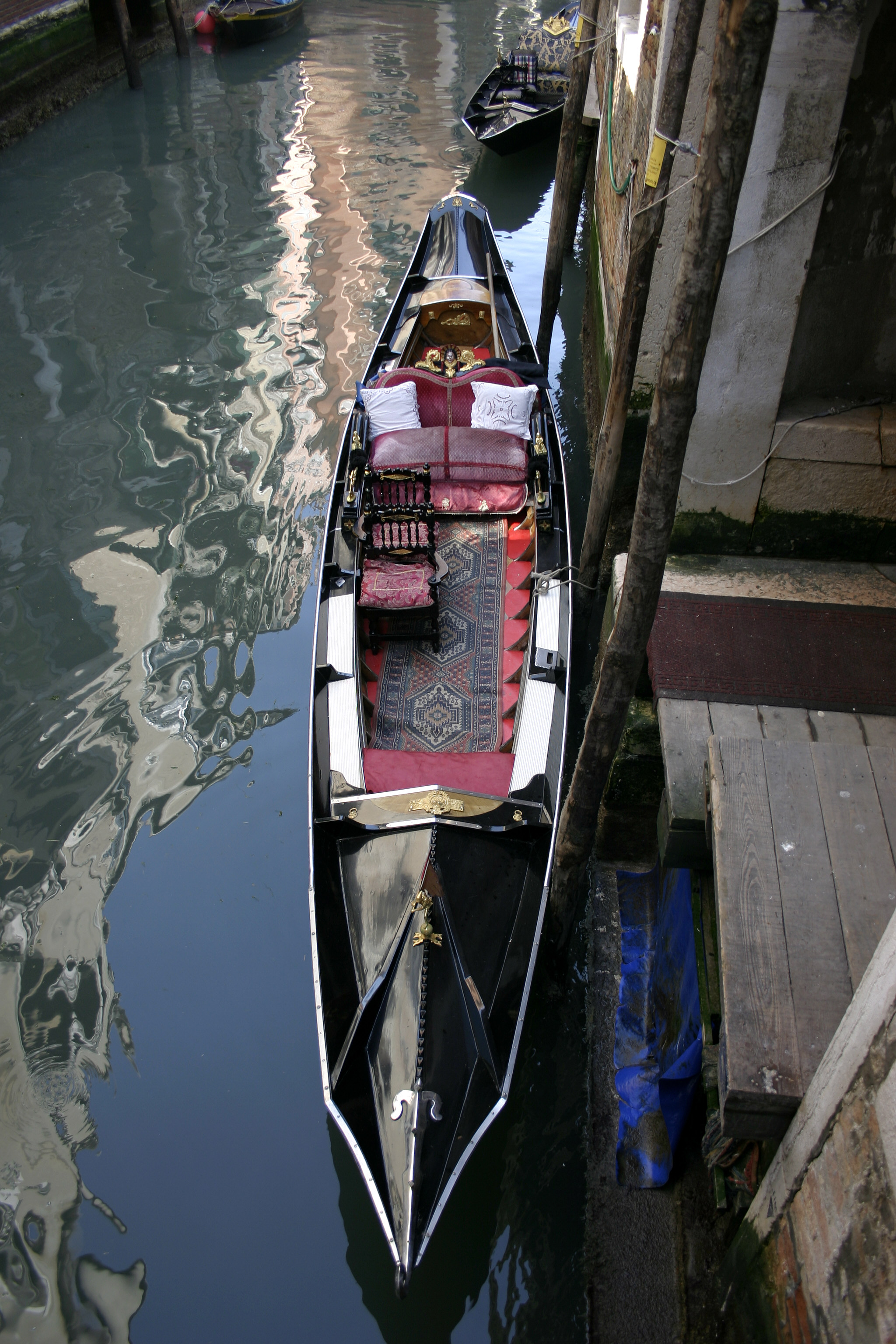
A sandolo

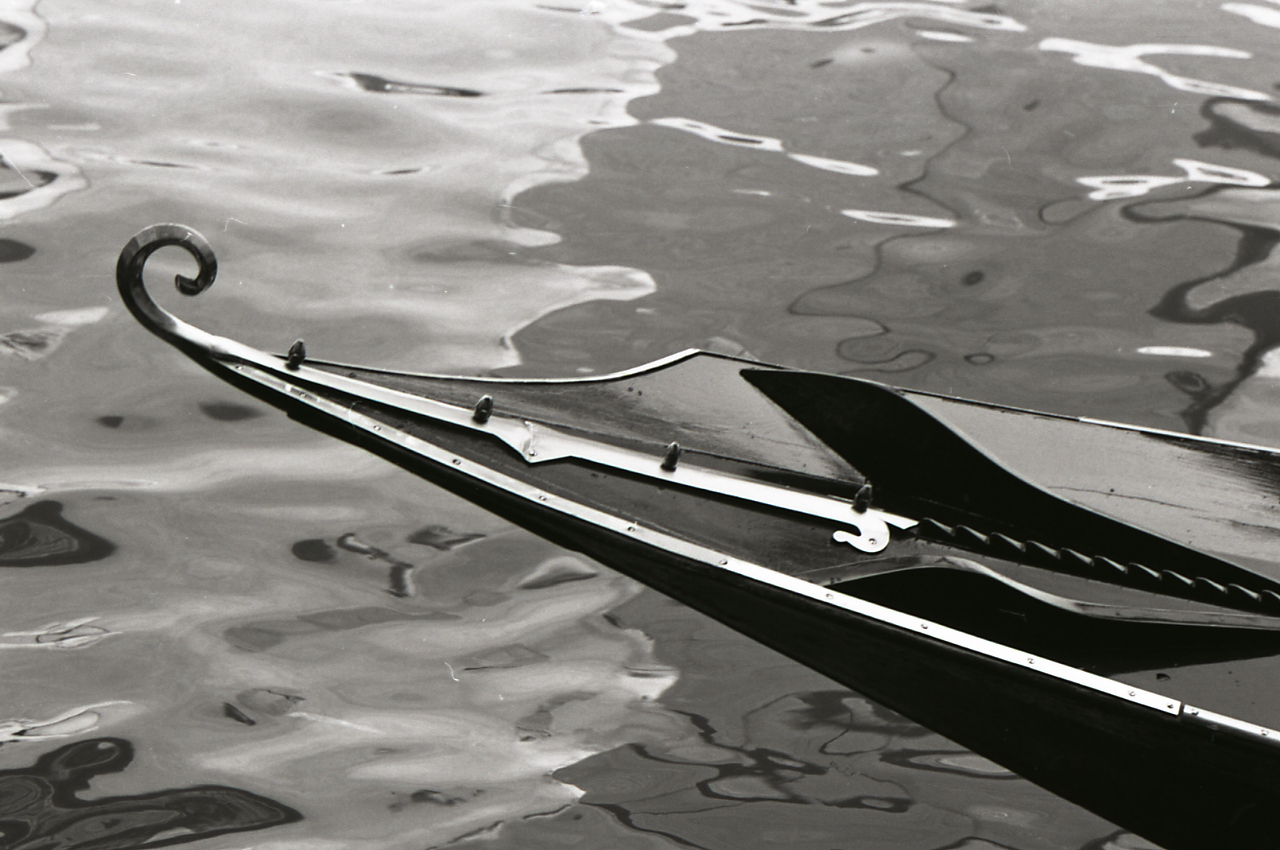
Sandolo, detail. Photo by Paolo Monti, 1969

The sandolo is a traditional, flat-bottomed Venetian rowing boat designed for the generally shallow waters of the Venetian Lagoon. The Italian plural is sandoli.

== Description ==
A sandolo is less ornate and of a simpler build than a gondola, but both have a pointed, decorated metal nose. It is also lighter and smaller than a gondola, and can be recognized at a glance, as it always lacks the benches and high steel prow (called ferro) which is seen on a gondola. The sandolo, like the larger craft, is rowed while standing up. It can be fitted with a sail, and also with an in-board or outboard motor.

In the past, the police used an extant variant of the sandolo called vipera, which differed in having no stem, being sharply pointed at both ends and constructed so that it can be rowed from either end.

Space in the sandolo is limited, with enough room for one oarsman, aft, two passengers on the main seat, and two more passengers sitting on small stools towards the bow, although for greater comfort some writers advise one passenger, or two small passengers. The traditional use of the sandolo is for recreation and racing, and it is considered one of the four principal types of boat used in and around Venice. Rather less stable than a gondola, it has a rocking motion all of its own.

Although not often used for fishing, as such, the craft is used for collecting crabs and mussels, while an early 20th-century writer noted that he had heard the sandolo called "the donkey cart of Venice". The boat has also been called "without doubt one of if not the most graceful of all Venetian craft". Less manoeuvrable but lighter than a gondola, it was in the past used especially by boys, artists, and women.

In Gondola Days (1897), Francis Hopkinson Smith (1838–1915) stated that the sandolo was "the only boat of really modern design, and this is rarely used as a fishing-boat". He went on to describe it as "a shallow skiff drawing but a few inches of water, and with bow and stern sharp and very low", and considered that it was originally intended for greater speed in boat racing.

Horatio Brown said in his Life on the Lagoons (1884), "The Venetians are not good boat-builders. The only boats they make successfully are gondolas and sandoli. In a later book he wrote, "The pleasantest way to go to Malamocco is to take a sandolo, if you can.

Alexander Robertson said of Venice in 1898, "Their streets are canals, their carriages are gondolas and sandolos..."
