= Ralph Leigh =

Ralph Alexander Leigh CBE FBA (6 January 1915 – 22 December 1987) was a modern languages scholar, Fellow of Trinity College, Cambridge, and Professor of French in the University of Cambridge from 1973 to 1982, later Sandars Readership in Bibliography, in 1986–87. He specialized in the work of Jean-Jacques Rousseau.

Born to Jewish parents, he was educated at Raine's School for Boys in Bethnal Green, Queen Mary College, London, and the University of Paris (Sorbonne). He served in the British Army during the Second World War from 1941, was commissioned as a Lieutenant in 1942, promoted Major, 1944, and returned to civilian life in 1946, when he was appointed a lecturer in the Department of French at the University of Edinburgh.

In 1967 he received a Fulbright Scholarship at Princeton. From 1969 to 1973 he was a Reader and Senior Research Fellow in the University of Cambridge, and in 1973 a visiting professor at the Sorbonne.

Between 1965 and 1987 he edited more than forty volumes of the correspondence of Jean Jacques Rousseau, a work still in progress at his death. Leigh collected about 8000 books and manuscripts related to his work on Jean-Jacques Rousseau: his library was purchased by Cambridge University Library and now forms the Leigh collection. Leigh also edited the catalogue of the 1978 Rousseau exhibition held at Cambridge University Library.

Leigh was a Leverhulme Fellow in 1959–1960, 1970, and 1982–1983. In 1978 he gave a Taylorian Lecture on 'Rousseau and the Problem of Tolerance in the Eighteenth Century'.

In 1945, Leigh married Edith Helen Kern, who died in 1972. They had one son and one daughter.

== Honours ==
- Litt. D. (Cambridge) 1968
- Fellow of the British Academy, 1969
- Commander of the Order of the British Empire, 1977
- Hon. Doctor, University of Neuchâtel, 1978
- Médaille d'argent de la Ville de Paris, 1978
- Chevalier de la Légion d'Honneur, 1979
- Hon. Doctor, University of Geneva, 1983
- D. Univ. Edinburgh, 1986

== Major publications ==
- Correspondance Complète de Jean Jacques Rousseau, vols. I-XLVI, 1965 to 1987
- Rousseau and the Problem of Tolerance in the Rousseau and the Problem of Tolerance in the Eighteenth Century, (Taylorian Lecture for 1978), 1979
- Rousseau after 200 years (ed.), 1982

Contributor to Modern Language Review, French Studies, Revue de littérature comparée, Annales Rousseau, Revue d'Histoire littéraire, Studies on Voltaire and other journals.
