= John Addington Symonds =

English poet, literary critic and cultural historian (1840–1893)

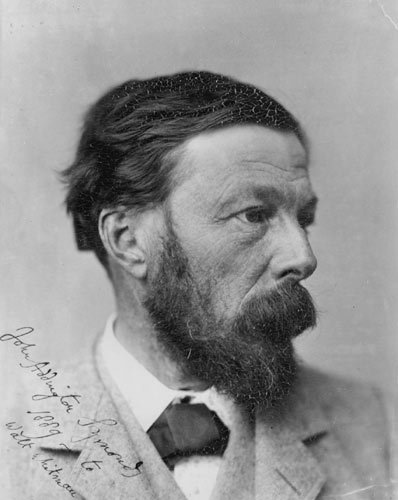
Symonds, picture for Walt Whitman, dated 1889

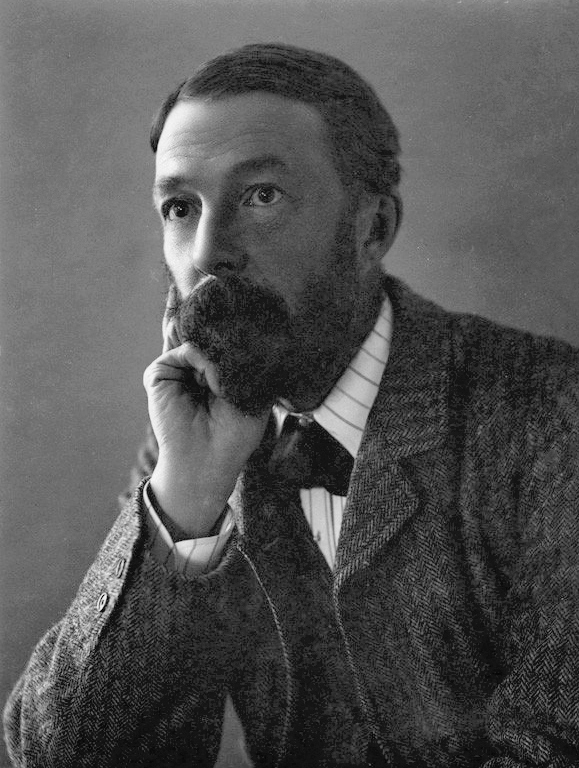
Symonds by Eveleen Tennant

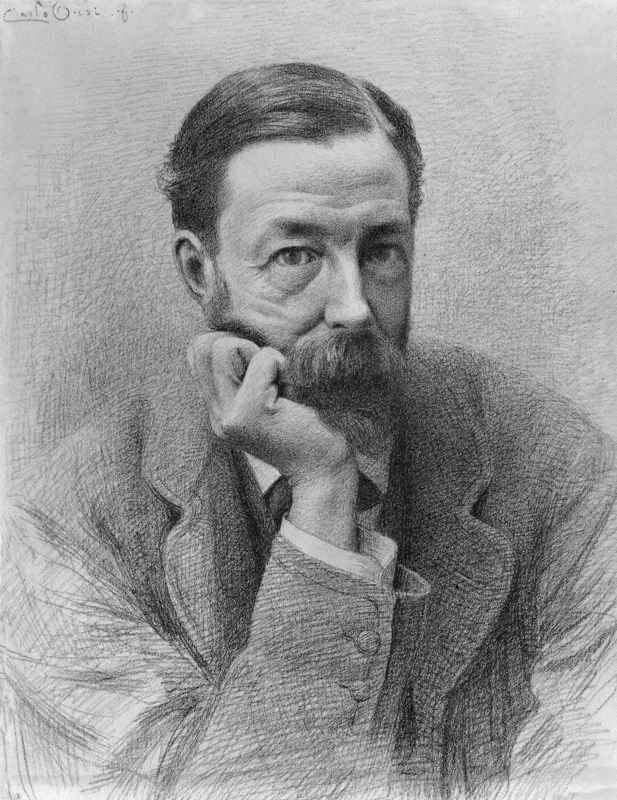
Symonds by Carlo Orsi

John Addington Symonds Jr. (/ˈsɪmən(d)z/; 5 October 1840 – 19 April 1893) was an English poet and literary critic. A cultural historian, he was known for his work on the Renaissance, as well as numerous biographies of writers and artists. Although married with children, Symonds supported male love, which he believed could include pederastic as well as egalitarian relationships, referring to it as l'amour de l'impossible (love of the impossible). He also wrote much poetry inspired by his same-sex affairs.

== Early life and education ==
Symonds was born in Bristol, England, in 1840. His father, the physician John Addington Symonds (1807–1871), was the author of Criminal Responsibility (1869), The Principles of Beauty (1857) and Sleep and Dreams. The younger Symonds, considered delicate, did not take part in games at Harrow School after the age of 14, and he showed no particular promise as a scholar.

Symonds moved to Clifton Hill House at the age of ten, an event which he believed had a large and beneficial impact towards his health and spiritual development. Symonds's delicate condition continued, and as a child he suffered from nightmares in which corpses in and under his bed prompted sleepwalking; on one such occasion he was almost drowned when, sleepwalking in the attic of Clifton Hill House, he reached a cistern of rainwater. According to Symonds, an angel with "blue eyes and wavy, blonde hair" woke him and brought him to safety; this figure frequented Symonds's dreams and was potentially his first homosexual awakening.

In January 1858, Symonds received a letter from his friend Alfred Pretor (1840–1908), telling of Pretor's affair with their headmaster at Harrow, Charles John Vaughan. Symonds was shocked and disgusted, feelings complicated by his growing awareness of his own homosexuality. He did not mention the incident for more than a year until in 1859, when a student at Oxford University, he told the story to John Conington, the Latin professor. Conington approved of romantic relationships between men and boys. Earlier, he had given Symonds a copy of Ionica, a collection of homoerotic verse by William Johnson Cory, the influential Eton College master and advocate of pederastic pedagogy. Conington encouraged Symonds to tell his father about his friend's affair, and the senior Symonds forced Vaughan to resign from Harrow. Pretor was angered by the younger man's part, and never spoke to Symonds again.

In the autumn of 1858, Symonds went to Balliol College, Oxford, as a commoner but was elected to an exhibition in the following year. In spring of that same year, he fell in love with William Fear Dyer (1843–1905), a Bristol choirboy three years younger. They engaged in a chaste love affair that lasted a year, until broken up by Symonds. The friendship continued for several years afterwards, until at least 1864. Dyer became organist and choirmaster of St Nicholas Church, Bristol.

At Oxford University, Symonds became engaged in his studies and began to demonstrate his academic ability. In 1860, he took a first in Mods and won the Newdigate prize with a poem on "The Escorial"; in 1862 he obtained a first in Literae Humaniores, and in 1863 won the Chancellor's English Essay.

In 1862, Symonds was elected to an open fellowship at the conservative Magdalen College, Oxford. He made friends with a C. G. H. Shorting, whom he took as a private pupil. When Symonds refused to help Shorting gain admission to Magdalen, the younger man wrote to school officials alleging "that I [Symonds] had supported him in his pursuit of the chorister Walter Thomas Goolden (1848–1901), that I shared his habits and was bent on the same path." Although Symonds was officially cleared of any wrongdoing, he suffered a breakdown from the stress and shortly thereafter left the university for Switzerland.

== Personal life ==
In Switzerland, he met Janet Catherine North (sister of botanical artist Marianne North, 1830–1890). They married at Hastings on 10 November 1864. They settled in London and had four daughters: Janet (born 1865), Charlotte (born 1867), Margaret (Madge) (born 1869) and Katharine (born 1875; she was later honoured for her writing as Dame Katharine Furse). Edward Lear wrote "The Owl and the Pussycat" for the three-year-old Janet.

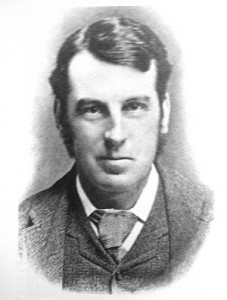
Norman Moor

While in Clifton in 1868, Symonds met and fell in love with Norman Moor (10 January 1851 – 6 March 1895), a youth about to go up to Oxford, who became his pupil. Symonds and Moor had a four-year affair but did not have sex, although according to Symonds's diary of 28 January 1870, "I stripped him naked and fed sight, touch and mouth on these things." The relationship occupied a good part of his time, including one occasion he left his family and travelled to Italy and Switzerland with Moor. The unconsummated affair also inspired his most productive period of composing poetry, published in 1880 as New and Old: A Volume of Verse.

== Career ==
Symonds intended to study law, but his health again broke down and forced him to travel. Returning to Clifton, he lectured there, both at the college and ladies' schools. From his lectures, he prepared the essays in his Introduction to the Study of Dante (1872) and Studies of the Greek Poets (1873–1876).

Meanwhile, he was occupied with his major work, Renaissance in Italy, which appeared in seven volumes at intervals between 1875 and 1886. Since his prize essay on the Renaissance at Oxford, Symonds had wanted to study it further and emphasise the reawakening of art and literature in Europe. His work was interrupted by serious illness. In 1877 his life was in danger. His recovery at Davos Platz led him to believe this was the only place where he was likely to enjoy life.

He henceforth made his home at Davos, and wrote about it in Our Life in the Swiss Highlands (1891). Symonds became a citizen of the town; he took part in its municipal business, made friends with the peasants, and shared their interests. There he wrote most of his books: biographies of Percy Bysshe Shelley (1878), Philip Sidney (1886), Ben Jonson (1886) and Michelangelo (1893), several volumes of poetry and essays, and a translation of the Autobiography of Benvenuto Cellini (1887).

It is there that he also completed his study of the Renaissance, the work for which he is chiefly remembered. He was feverishly active throughout his life. Considering his poor health, his productivity was remarkable. Two works, a volume of essays, In the Key of Blue, and a monograph on Walt Whitman, were published in the year of his death. His activity was unbroken to the last.

He had a passion for Italy, and for many years resided during the autumn in the house of his friend, Horatio F. Brown, on the Zattere, in Venice. In 1891 he made an effort to visit Karl Heinrich Ulrichs in L'Aquila. He died in Rome and was buried close to the grave of Percy Bysshe Shelley.

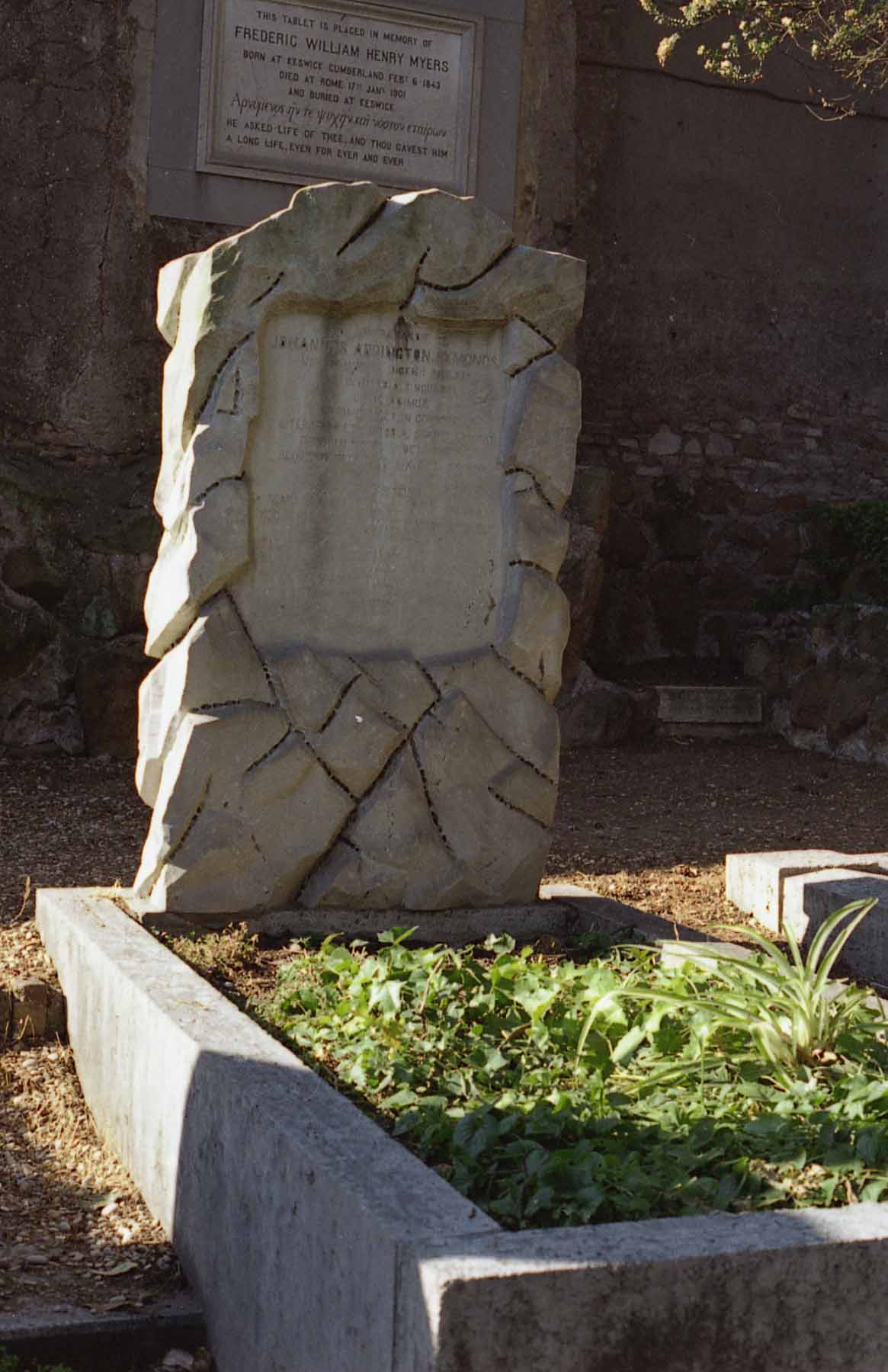
Symonds's tomb in Rome

== Legacy ==
Symonds left his papers and his autobiography in the hands of Brown, who wrote an expurgated biography in 1895, which Edmund Gosse further stripped of homoerotic content before publication. In 1926, upon coming into the possession of Symonds's papers, Gosse burned everything except the memoirs, to the dismay of Symonds's granddaughter.

Symonds was morbidly introspective, but with a capacity for action. In Talks and Talkers, the contemporary writer Robert Louis Stevenson described Symonds (known as "Opalstein" in Stevenson's essay) as "the best of talkers, singing the praises of the earth and the arts, flowers and jewels, wine and music, in a moonlight, serenading manner, as to the light guitar." Beneath his good fellowship, he was a melancholic.

This side of his nature is revealed in his gnomic poetry, and particularly in the sonnets of his Animi Figura (1882). He portrayed his own character with great subtlety. His poetry is perhaps rather that of the student than of the inspired singer, but it has moments of deep thought and emotion.

It is, indeed, in passages and extracts that Symonds appears at his best. Rich in description, full of "purple patches", his work lacks the harmony and unity essential to the conduct of philosophical argument. His translations are among the finest in the language; here his subject was found for him, and he was able to lavish on it the wealth of colour and quick sympathy which were his characteristics.

=== Homosexual writings ===
Front cover of the 1983 reprint edition, edited by John Lauritsen

In 1873, Symonds wrote A Problem in Greek Ethics, a work of what would later be called "gay history". He was inspired by the poetry of Walt Whitman, with whom he corresponded. The work, "perhaps the most exhaustive eulogy of Greek love," remained unpublished for a decade, and then was printed at first only in a limited edition for private distribution. Although the Oxford English Dictionary credits the medical writer C. G. Chaddock for introducing "homosexual" into the English language in 1892, Symonds had already used the word in A Problem in Greek Ethics. Aware of the taboo nature of his subject matter, Symonds referred obliquely to pederasty as "that unmentionable custom" in a letter to a prospective reader of the book, but defined "Greek love" in the essay itself as "a passionate and enthusiastic attachment subsisting between man and youth, recognised by society and protected by opinion, which, though it was not free from sensuality, did not degenerate into mere licentiousness."

Symonds studied classics under Benjamin Jowett at Balliol College, Oxford, and later worked with Jowett on an English translation of Plato's Symposium. Jowett was critical of Symonds's opinions on sexuality, but when Symonds was falsely accused of corrupting choirboys, Jowett supported him, despite his own equivocal views of the relation of Hellenism to contemporary legal and social issues that affected homosexuals.

Symonds also translated classical poetry on homoerotic themes, and wrote poems drawing on ancient Greek imagery and language such as Eudiades, which has been called "the most famous of his homoerotic poems". While the taboos of Victorian England prevented Symonds from speaking openly about homosexuality, his works published for a general audience contained strong implications and some of the first direct references to male-male sexual love in English literature. For example, in "The Meeting of David and Jonathan", from 1878, Jonathan takes David "In his arms of strength / [and] in that kiss / Soul into soul was knit and bliss to bliss". The same year, his translations of Michelangelo's sonnets to the painter's beloved Tommaso Cavalieri restore the male pronouns which had been made female by previous editors. In November 2016, Symonds's homoerotic poem, 'The Song of the Swimmer', written in 1867, was published for the first time in the Times Literary Supplement.

By the end of his life, Symonds's bisexuality had become an open secret in certain literary and cultural circles. His private memoirs, written (but never completed) over a four-year period from 1889 to 1893, form the earliest known self-conscious gay autobiography.

Symonds's daughter, Madge Vaughan, was writer Virginia Woolf's adored friend; they exchanged many intimate letters. Woolf was the cousin of her husband William Wyamar Vaughan. Another daughter, Charlotte Symonds, married the classicist Walter Leaf. Henry James used some details of Symonds's life, especially the relationship between him and his wife, as the starting-point for the short story "The Author of Beltraffio" (1884).

Over a century after Symonds's death, in 2007, his first work on homosexuality, Soldier Love and Related Matter, was finally published by Andrew Dakyns (grandson of Symonds's associate, Henry Graham Dakyns), in Eastbourne, E. Sussex, England. Soldier Love, or Soldatenliebe since it was limited to a German edition. Symonds's English text is lost. This translation and edition by Dakyns is the only version ever to appear in the author's own language.

== Works ==
- The Renaissance. An Essay (1863)
- Miscellanies by John Addington Symonds, M.D.,: Selected and Edited with an Introductory Memoir, by His Son (1871)
- Introduction to the Study of Dante (1872); Symonds, John Addington (June 2002). 2002 reprint of 1899 4th edition. The Minerva Group. ISBN 0-89875-964-1.
- Studies of the Greek Poets, 2 vol. (1873, 1876)
- Renaissance in Italy, 7 vol. (1875–86)
- Shelley (1878)
- Sketches in Italy and Greece (London, Smith and Elder 1879)
- Sketches and Studies in Italy (London, Smith and Elder 1879)
- Animi Figura (1882)
- Sketches in Italy (Selections prepared by Symonds, arranged, so as to, in his own words in a Prefatory Note, "adapt itself to the use of travellers rather than of students"; Leipzig, Bernhard Tauchnitz 1883)
- A Problem in Greek Ethics (1883)
- Shakespere's Predecessors in the English Drama (1884)
- New Italian Sketches (Bernard Tauchnitz: Leipzig, 1884)
- Wine, Women, and Song. Medieval Latin Students' Songs (1884) English translations/paraphrases.
- Autobiography of Benvenuto Cellini (1887) An English translation.
- A Problem in Modern Ethics (1891)
- Our Life in the Swiss Highlands (1892) (with his daughter Margaret Symonds as coauthor)
- Essays: Speculative and Suggestive (1893)
- In the Key of Blue (1893)
- The Life of Michelangelo Buonarroti (1893)
- Walt Whitman. A Study (1893)
- Das konträre Geschlechtsgefühl (in German). Leipzig: Wigand. 1896. p. 1. with Havelock Ellis

== See also ==
- Uranian poetry
