= Leonard Ashley Willoughby =

British scholar of German literature

Leonard Ashley Willoughby (1885–1977) was a British scholar of German literature, and recipient of the Goethe Institute's Goethe Medal.

== Career ==
Willoughby was Professor of German at University College London from 1931 to 1950.

In 1936 together with Basil Blackwell he founded the journal German Life and Letters.

In 1947 he delivered the Taylorian Lecture at Oxford University, choosing as his topic “Unity and Continuity in Goethe”.

In 1952 a Festschrift was published in his honour under the title German Studies Presented to Leonard Ashley Willoughby by Pupils, Colleagues and Friends on his Retirement.

== Publications ==
- The Classical Age of German Literature: 1748-1805 (1926)
- The Romantic Movement in Germany (1930)
