= John George Robertson =

English philologist (1867–1933)

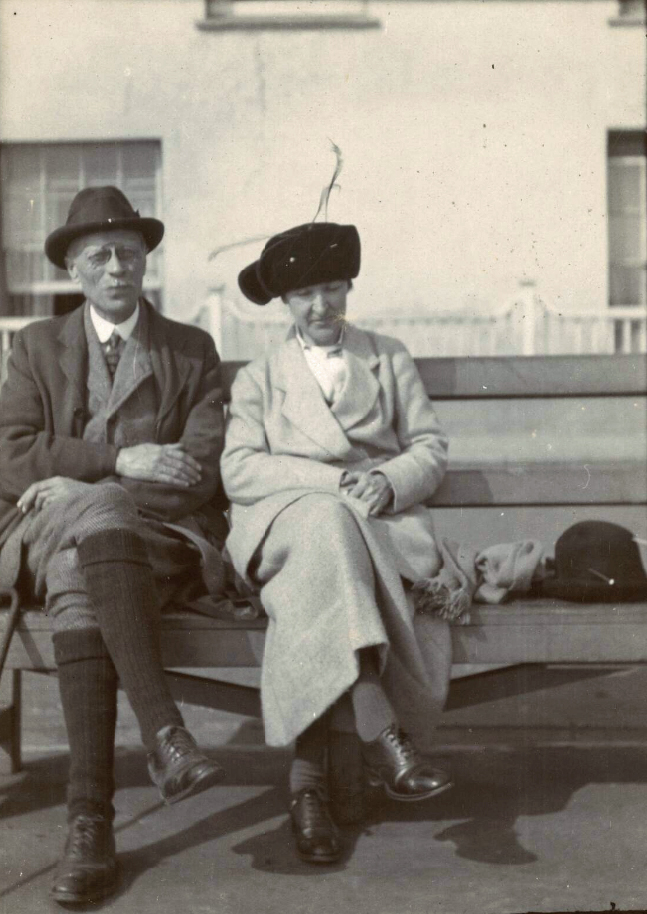
Henry Handel Richardson and husband, John George Robertson on a garden seat

John George Robertson, FBA (18 January 1867, Glasgow – 29 May 1933, London) was a philologist and professor of German language and literature.

== Biography ==
Robertson graduated with M.A. and B.Sc. from the University of Glasgow and then Ph.D. (Promotion) from Leipzig University. From 1896 to 1903 he was a lecturer in English at the University of Strassburg. At the University of London, he became in 1903 Professor of German Language and Literature and in 1924 Director of the Department of Scandinavian Studies. He was the founding editor-in-chief of the Modern Language Review. He wrote several books dealing with the literature of Germany and about a dozen articles for the 1911 Encyclopedia Britannica. At the University of Oxford he delivered the 1924 Taylorian Lecture with title The Gods of Greece in German Poetry.

After his death his successor, and former pupil, Edna Purdie completed his work on Lessing's Hamburgische Dramaturgie which was published in 1939.

== Private life ==
Richardson married Ethel Florence Lindesay Richardson, who became a novelist under her pen name "Henry Handel Richardson". They met in 1889 in Leipzig where he was a doctoral student in philology and where she was a piano student. They married in Dublin on 30 December 1895.

== Selected publications ==
- A history of German literature. G. P. Putnam's sons;etc., etc. 1902. 2nd edition. 1931.
- Schiller after a century. W. Blackwood and sons. 1905.
- Milton's fame on the continent. 1908.
- Outline of the history of German literature. G.P. Putnam's sons. 1911.
- Goethe and the twentieth century. The Cambridge manuals of science and literature. The University Press; G.P. Putnam's Sons. 1912.
- The gods of Greece in German poetry. 1924.
