= Edna Purdie =

British professor of German studies

- Purdie in 1963
- Born: 27 November 1894; St Albans, Hertfordshire, England
- Died: 1968 (aged 73–74)
- Occupation: Professor of German
- Known for: Emeritus Professor of German at the University of London
- Predecessor: John George Robertson

Edna Purdie (1894 – 1968) was a British Emeritus Professor of German studies at the University of London.

== Life ==
Edna Purdie was born on 27 November 1894 in St Albans to Elizabeth and George Robert Purdie. Her father was a civil servant, working as an inspector of schools. She was educated privately. She went on to study at the Trinity Laban Conservatoire of Music and Dance and King's College London. By 1916, she was at Somerville College in Oxford researching literary ballads written in English. She left in 1917 to lecture about German studies at Liverpool University and at the University College of North Wales. She became a professor of German studies in 1933 when she joined Bedford College for women. In 1930, Lillian Penson became Bedford College's Chair of modern history. Susan Stebbing and Edna Purdie were noted as two of her supporters and friends.

Purdie was a student and follower of Professor John George Robertson. After Robertson's death, Purdie was his successor, and she completed his work on Lessing's Hamburgische Dramaturgie which she published in 1939.

She was awarded the title of Emeritus Professor on her retirement. Her photo was taken by the Bassano company and several of them are in the National Portrait Gallery.

== Death and legacy ==
The Germanist Professor Norman Frederick wrote to Purdie in 1967. He had been German Professor at King's College and was then Mellon professor at the University of Pittsburgh. He complained to her that The Times newspaper was to stop its tradition of printing obituaries on its front page. He admitted his regard for her notability when he wrote, "The Times is becoming a quite deplorable paper. Our deaths will have to appear on the last page, which I find humiliating." They both died in 1968. After her death a fund was set up to assist students of Royal Holloway College and Bedford College in their research if it had a Germanic interest.

Purdie's papers are held at Royal Holloway.
