= H. W. Garrod =

British classical scholar

Portrait of Garrod by Rodrigo Moynihan, c. 1955

Heathcote William Garrod CBE FBA ( 21 January 1878 – 25 December 1960) was a British classical scholar and literary scholar.

== Early life and education ==
Garrod was born in Wells, Somerset, the fifth of six children of solicitor Charles William Garrod and his wife, Louisa (née Ashby). He attended Bath College and Balliol College, Oxford. He received the 1900 Gaisford prize for Greek prose, and in 1901 the Newdigate Prize for an English poem. Following a first class in the Final Honour School of Literae Humaniores in the summer term of 1901, he was in October that year elected a Fellow of Merton College, Oxford, a position he kept for over 60 years.

== Career ==
In June 1902 he was appointed to an assistant tutorship at Corpus Christi College, Oxford. Although educated primarily in classics, Garrod became more interested in English literature. His 1923 work, Wordsworth: Lectures and Essays was well received and led to his position as Oxford Professor of Poetry from 1923 to 1928. In 1925, he resigned his tutorship in classics at Oxford for a research fellowship in English, which had been vacant after the death of W. P. Ker. From 1929 to 1930, Garrod was the Charles Eliot Norton professor at Harvard University.

Garrod published a series of critical studies, essays and lectures on various English writers and poets, including The Profession of Poetry (1929); Poetry and the Criticism of Life (1931); Keats: a Critical Appreciation (1926); and Collins (1928). His 1939 and 1958 works on John Keats in the series Oxford English Texts remains an important book for scholars.

== First World War ==
During the First World War, he worked on the civilian side, first with the Ministry of Munitions and then in the Ministry of Reconstruction. He was appointed a Commander of the Order of the British Empire (CBE) in the 1918 New Year Honours for his efforts.

Though the remark is frequently attributed to others more famous, more reliable sources give him as the person who, when accosted by a woman during the First World War asking why he was not with the soldiers fighting to defend civilization, replied: "Madam, I am the civilization they are fighting to defend."

== Honours ==
In addition to the CBE, Garrod received honorary doctorates from the University of Durham (DLitt, 1930) and the University of Edinburgh (LLD, 1953). He was elected a Fellow of the British Academy in 1931.

Garrod, who never married, died at the Acland Nursing Home in Oxford on Christmas Day 1960.

== Works ==
- Statii Thebais et Achilleis (Oxford, 1906) editor (second edition in 1926, reprinted in 1951)
- Opvs epistolarvm Des Erasmi Roterdami (1906) editor with H. M. Allen
- The Religion of All Good Men: And Other Studies in Christian Ethics (1906)
- Manili Astronomicon Liber II (1911)
- The Oxford Book of Latin Verse (1912)
- Oxford Poems (John Lane 1912)
- Einhard's Life of Charlemagne (1915) editor with R. B. Mowat
- Wordsworth: Lectures and Essays (1923)
- Byron 1824–1924 (1924)
- The Profession of Poetry, Inaugural Lecture as Professor of Poetry, University of Oxford, 13 February 1924 (1924)
- Coleridge Poetry and Prose with Essays By Hazlitt, Jeffrey, De Quincey, Carlyle & Others (1925) editor
- Keats (1926)
- Merton Muniments (1928) with P. S. Allen
- The Poetry of Collins (1928) Warton Lecture
- The Profession of Poetry and other lectures (1929)
- Poetry and the Criticism of Life (1931)
- Ancient Painted Glass in Merton College Oxford (1931)
- Tolstoi's Theory of Art (1935) Taylorian Lecture
- Opera Flacci, Q. Horati (1941) editor with Edward C. Wickham
- Epigrams (1946)
- Scholarship, its Meaning and Value. The J. H. Gray Lectures for 1946 (1946)
- List of the Writings of H. W. Garrod (1947)
- John Donne; Poetry and Prose with Izaac Walton's Life. Appreciations By Ben Jonson, Dryden, Coleridge and Others (1948)
- Genius Loci and other essays (1950)
- Poetical Works of John Keats (1956)
- Study of Good Letters (1963)

== Additional sources ==
- J.A. Smith, The Nature of Art : An Open Letter to the Professor of Poetry in the University of Oxford, Oxford : Oxford University Press (1924)
- John Jones, "Heathcote William Garrod. 1878–1960," Proceedings of the British Academy 48 (1962) 357–370
- J. Carey, The Unexpected Professor : An Oxford Life in Books, London : Faber & Faber (2014) 138-42
