= 2018 South American Cricket Championship =

- Dates: 23 – 26 August 2018
- Cricket format: Twenty20 International
- Host: Colombia
- Champions: Mexico (men's); Brazil (women's)
- Participants: 8 (men's); 4 (women's)
- Matches: 42 (29 men's, 13 women's)

The 2018 South American Cricket Championship was a cricket tournament held in Mosquera, Colombia from 23 to 26 September 2018. A men's and women's tournament held, with 2018 being the fifteenth edition of the men's South American Cricket Championship and the seventh edition of the women's event. For the first time, women's matches played at the South American Cricket Championship were granted Twenty20 International (T20I) status after the ICC granted Twenty20 International (T20I) status to matches between all of its Members; for women's teams starting from 1 July 2018 and for men's teams from 1 January 2019. Argentina were the defending champions from 2017 in both the men's and women's event, but fielded a developmental 'A' team in the men's tournament and did not enter the women's event in 2018.

Mexico won the men's tournament, defeating Uruguay by 6 wickets in the final. Brazil regained the women's title, which they had previously won in 2015 and 2016.

== Participating teams ==
Men:

- Argentina A
- Brazil
- Chile
- Colombia
- Colombia
- Mexico
- Peru
- Uruguay

Women:

- Brazil
- Chile
- Mexico
- Peru

== Men's championship ==
The eight participating teams were the national sides of Brazil, Chile, Colombia, Costa Rica, Mexico, Peru, Uruguay and an Argentina A side. Costa Rica made their debut in the South American Championship. Matches did not have T20I status. Mexico won for the second time.

=== Points table ===
Team	P	W	L	T	NR	Pts	NRR	Status
Mexico	7	7	0	0	0	21	+1.383	Advanced to the Final
Uruguay	7	5	2	0	0	15	+0.582	Advanced to the Final
Costa Rica	7	4	3	0	0	12	+0.913	
Colombia	7	4	3	0	0	12	+0.289	
Peru	7	3	4	0	0	9	–0.937	
Brazil	7	2	5	0	0	6	–0.387	
Argentina A	7	2	5	0	0	6	–1.420	
Chile	7	1	6	0	0	3	–0.750	

=== Final ===
6 October 2019
15:00
Scorecard

Uruguay; 44 (17 overs)	v	Mexico; 45/4 (10 overs)
Avijit Mukherjee 11 (26); Aman Arora 5/4 (4 overs)		Tarun Sharma 13 (12); Shivansh Sitoke 1/5 (1 over)

Mexico won by 6 wickets
Los Pinos Polo Club, Mosquera
Umpires: Oscar Andrade (Ber) and Mohammad Iqbal (Can)

- Mexico won the toss and elected to field.

== Women's championship ==
The four participating teams were the national women's sides of Brazil, Chile, Mexico and Peru. All of these teams were ICC Associate Members, but Peru's squad did not meet eligibility criteria, so all matches other than those involving Peru had WT20I status. Brazil won the event.

=== Points table ===
Team	P	W	L	T	N/R	Pts	NRR	Status
Brazil	6	6	0	0	0	18	+5.942	Advanced to the Final
Chile	6	4	2	0	0	12	–1.370	Advanced to the Final
Peru	6	1	5	0	0	3	–1.700	
Mexico	6	1	5	0	0	3	–2.268	

=== Final ===
26 August 2019
13:00
Scorecard

Brazil; 137/6 (20 overs)	v	Chile; 45 (15 overs)
Narayana Ribeiro 34 (31); Jessica Miranda 2/14 (4 overs)		Tiara Pueye 9 (10); Renata Sousa 3/5 (3 over)

Brazil Women won by 92 runs
Los Pinos Polo Club field 2, Mosquera

- Brazil Women won the toss and elected to bat.
