= 2023 Men's South American Cricket Championship =

Cricket tournament in Argentina

- Dates: 18 – 21 October 2023
- Cricket format: Twenty20 International (Note: Only matches contested between Argentina, Chile, Mexico and Panama had T20I status.)
- Tournament format(s): Round-robin and play-offs
- Host: Argentina
- Champions: Argentina (12th title)
- Runners-up: Uruguay
- Participants: 8
- Matches: 18
- Player of the series: (Colombia) Laurel Parks
- Most runs: (Colombia) Laurel Parks (255)
- Most wickets: (Uruguay) Bommineni Ravindra (10)

The 2023 Men's South American Cricket Championship was a cricket tournament that took place in Argentina from 18 to 21 October 2023. This was the eighteenth edition of the men's South American Cricket Championship, and the second in which some matches had Twenty20 International (T20I0) status, since the ICC granted T20I status to all Twenty20 matches between all of its members.

The eight participating teams were the hosts Argentina, along with Brazil, Chile, Colombia, Mexico, Peru, Panama and Uruguay. Argentina were the defending champions, having won the event in 2022.

== Squads ==
Argentina	Brazil	Chile	Colombia
Pedro Baron (c, wk); Bruno Angeletti; Guido Angeletti; Santiago Duggan; Hernán Fennell; Alejandro Ferguson; Manuel Iturbe; Santiago Iturbe (wk); Alan Kirschbaum; Agustin Rivero; Ian Roberts; Lucas Rossi; Tomas Rossi; Oliver Rowe	Greigor Caisley (c); Yasar Haroon (vc); Michel Assuncao; Richard Avery; Ian Crouch; Sayed Hashimi; Kawsar Khan; Lucas Maximo (wk); William Maximo; Luiz Muller; Atiqur Rahman; Suryanarayanan Ramaswamy; Syed Shah; Leon Smit	Alex Carthew (c); Guillermo Aburto; Nelson Aburto; John Bartlett (wk); Eduardo Carrasco; Benjamin Constanzo; Michael Espinoza; Joseph Head; Jack Inglis; Eduardo Leal; James Miley; Ignacio Miranda; Mario Ovalle (wk); Hamish Pearson; Alfredo Puentes; Anthony Roe; Simon Shalders; Edward Taylor; Amit Uniyal	Paul Reid (c); Visuddha Perera (vc, wk); Oliver Barnes; Thomas Donegan; Salim Guzman; Philip Konecny; Haran Manimaran; Laurel Parks; Christopher Price; Kartik Radhakrishnan; Satnam Sandhu; Anshul Sehrawat; Srinivasan Seshadri; Pravin Shamdasani; Niroshan Sirisena; Jean Wood
Mexico	Panama	Peru	Uruguay
Tarun Sharma (c); Puneet Arora; Pratik Bais; Seetharam Guruvayoorappan (wk); Luis Hermida; Shantanu Kaveri; Kaushal Kumar (wk); Shashikant Laxman; Bhargav Narasimha; Shoaib Rafiq; Praveen Santhanakrishnan; Harprit Singh; Mukesh Singh; Anurag Tripathi	Mahmed Bawa (c); Yusuf Abovat; Faizal Afzal Salehji; Akash Ahir; Bhavik Ahir; Breeze Ahir; Jaimin Ahir; Khandubhai Ahir (wk); Malavkumar Ahir; Ronitkumar Ahir; Smith Ahir; Ahmad Bhayat; Yusuf Ebrahim; Divyesh Kapadiya; Muhammad Sarkar	Shaikh Ashraf (c); Harshil Brahmbhatt; Ramses Cespedes; Joel Cubas; Roshan De Silva (wk); Hafez Farooq; Mohsin Hub; Suresh Kumar; Joaquín Massaro; George Parsons; Rohan Punjabi; Anthony Sanford; Callum Sanford	Bommineni Ravindra (c); Dhanushraj Arun; Soham Gupta (vc, wk); Karan Khandelwal; Saravanan Krishnamoorthy; Avijit Mukherjee; Ali Nawaz; Sunil Patil; Subrat Patra; Himanshu Pundhir; Rashin Rajendran; Boopathy Ravi; Bharath Ravichandran; Anand Sasidharan; Paneer Saravanan; Yash Sharma

== Round-robin ==
=== Group A ===
Pos	Team	Pld	W	L	NR	Pts	NRR	Qualification
1	Argentina	3	3	0	0	6	2.717	Advanced to the semi-finals
2	Mexico	3	2	1	0	4	2.222	Advanced to the semi-finals
3	Peru	3	1	2	0	2	−1.676	Advanced to the 5th place play-off
4	Chile	3	0	3	0	0	−3.155	Advanced to the 7th place play-off

Source: ESPNcricinfo

18 October 2023
10:00
Scorecard

Argentina; 149/8 (20 overs)	v	Peru; 97/4 (20 overs)
Hernán Fennell 30 (18); Mohsin Hub 2/13 (2 overs)		Hafez Farooq 35* (41); Santiago Duggan 1/10 (3 overs); Lucas Rossi 1/10 (3 overs)

Argentina won by 52 runs
St. George's College Ground 2, Quilmes
Umpires: Steven Caines (Ber) and Mark McCormack (Ber)
Player of the match: Alan Kirschbaum (Arg)

- Peru won the toss and elected to field.

18 October 2023
14:30
Scorecard

Chile; 72/7 (20 overs)	v	Mexico; 74/5 (13.2 overs)
Simon Shalders 21 (33); Pratik Bais 2/14 (4 overs)		Kaushal Kumar 21* (26); Edward Taylor 2/26 (4 overs)

Mexico won by 5 wickets
St. George's College Ground 1, Quilmes
Umpires: Andrew Elliott (Eng) and Mark McCormack (Ber)
Player of the match: Shashikant Laxman (Mex)

- Chile won the toss and elected to bat.
- Guillermo Aburto, Nelson Aburto, John Bartlett, Jack Inglis, Mario Ovalle, Alfredo Puentes, Anthony Roe, Simon Shalders, Edward Taylor (Chi), Pratik Bais, Bhargav Narasimha, Shoaib Rafiq, Mukesh Singh and Praveen Santhanakrishnan (Mex) all made their T20I debuts.

19 October 2023
14:30
Scorecard

Mexico; 124/6 (20 overs)	v	Argentina; 125/6 (19 overs)
Puneet Arora 51* (48); Hernán Fennell 2/8 (4 overs)		Tomas Rossi 38 (33); Shoaib Rafiq 3/14 (4 overs)

Argentina won by 4 wickets
St. George's College Ground 1, Quilmes
Umpires: Andrew Elliott (Eng) and Precious Smith (Ber)
Player of the match: Tomas Rossi (Arg)

- Argentina won the toss and elected to field.
- Guido Angeletti, Santiago Duggan, Manuel Iturbe, Ian Roberts, Lucas Rossi (Arg), Seetharam Guruvayoorappan and Harprit Singh (Mex) all made their T20I debuts.

19 October 2023
14:30
Scorecard

Chile; 91/8 (20 overs)	v	Peru; 92/1 (13.1 overs)
Edward Taylor 28 (36); Mohsin Hub 2/6 (2 overs)		Harshil Brahmbhatt 40* (43)

Peru won by 9 wickets
St. George's College Ground 2, Quilmes
Umpires: Steven Caines (Ber) and Mark McCormack (Ber)
Player of the match: Harshil Brahmbhatt (Per)

- Chile won the toss and elected to bat.

20 October 2023
14:30
Scorecard

Chile; 52 (19.4 overs)	v	Argentina; 53/0 (6 overs)
Alex Carthew 6 (16); Lucas Rossi 5/3 (4 overs)		Pedro Baron 34* (22)

Argentina won by 10 wickets
St. George's College Ground 1, Quilmes
Umpires: Steven Caines (Ber) and Andrew Elliott (Eng)
Player of the match: Lucas Rossi (Arg)

- Chile won the toss and elected to bat.
- Santiago Iturbe, Oliver Rowe (Arg) and Benjamin Constanzo (Chi) all made their T20I debuts.

20 October 2023
14:30
Scorecard

Mexico; 198/5 (20 overs)	v	Peru; 110/6 (20 overs)
Luis Hermida 51 (35); Mohsin Hub 2/26 (4 overs)		Suresh Kumar 37 (36); Shoaib Rafiq 2/1 (1 over)

Mexico won by 88 runs
St. George's College Ground 2, Quilmes
Umpires: Mark McCormack (Ber) and Precious Smith (Ber)
Player of the match: Luis Hermida (Mex)

- Peru won the toss and elected to field.

=== Group B ===
Pos	Team	Pld	W	L	NR	Pts	NRR	Qualification
1	Uruguay	3	2	1	0	4	0.265	Advanced to the semi-finals
2	Colombia	3	2	1	0	4	−0.118	Advanced to the semi-finals
3	Brazil	3	1	2	0	2	0.077	Advanced to the 5th place play-off
4	Panama	3	1	2	0	2	−0.282	Advanced to the 7th place play-off

Source: ESPNcricinfo

18 October 2023
10:00
Scorecard

Uruguay; 108/8 (20 overs)	v	Brazil; 89/8 (20 overs)
Paneer Saravanan 34 (35); Sayed Hashimi 3/15 (3 overs)		Yasar Haroon 38 (46); Yash Sharma 2/8 (4 overs)

Uruguay won by 19 runs
St. George's College Ground 1, Quilmes
Umpires: Andrew Elliott (Eng) and Precious Smith (Ber)
Player of the match: Bommineni Ravindra (Uru)

- Brazil won the toss and elected to field.

18 October 2023
14:30
Scorecard

Colombia; 145/6 (20 overs)	v	Panama; 137/3 (20 overs)
Laurel Parks 77* (53); Faizal Afzal 3/26 (4 overs)		Breeze Ahir 49 (49); Philip Konecny 1/14 (4 overs)

Colombia won by 8 runs
St. George's College Ground 2, Quilmes
Umpires: Steven Caines (Ber) and Precious Smith (Ber)
Player of the match: Laurel Parks (Col)

- Colombia won the toss and elected to bat.

19 October 2023
10:00
Scorecard

Panama; 99/8 (20 overs)	v	Brazil; 100/7 (15.4 overs)
Mahmed Bawa 32 (33); Michel Assuncao 2/18 (4 overs)		Yasar Haroon 43 (41); Ronitkumar Ahir 3/25 (4 overs)

Brazil won by 3 wickets
St. George's College Ground 1, Quilmes
Umpires: Mark McCormack (Ber) and Precious Smith (Ber)
Player of the match: Yasar Haroon (Bra)

- Brazil won the toss and elected to field.

19 October 2023
10:00
Scorecard

Colombia; 132/6 (20 overs)	v	Uruguay; 135/4 (17.5 overs)
Oliver Barnes 44* (46); Himanshu Pundhir 3/20 (3 overs)		Sunil Patil 53 (38); Laurel Parks 2/20 (4 overs)

Uruguay won by 6 wickets
St. George's College Ground 2, Quilmes
Umpires: Steven Caines (Ber) and Andrew Elliott (Eng)
Player of the match: Sunil Patil (Uru)

- Uruguay won the toss and elected to field.

20 October 2023
10:00
Scorecard

Panama; 120/8 (20 overs)	v	Uruguay; 101 (19 overs)
Yusuf Abovat 34 (32); Yash Sharma 3/17 (4 overs)		Avijit Mukherjee 19 (32); Faizal Afzal 3/19 (3 overs)

Panama won by 19 runs
St. George's College Ground 1, Quilmes
Umpires: Andrew Elliott (Eng) and Mark McCormack (Ber)
Player of the match: Divyesh Kapadiya (Pan)

- Panama won the toss and elected to bat.

20 October 2023
10:00
Scorecard

Brazil; 139/4 (20 overs)	v	Colombia; 140/7 (19.4 overs)
Leon Smit 40 (42); Haran Manimaran 1/18 (3 overs)		Laurel Parks 57 (47); Leon Smit 2/19 (4 overs)

Colombia won by 3 wickets
St. George's College Ground 2, Quilmes
Umpires: Steven Caines (Ber) and Precious Smith (Ber)
Player of the match: Laurel Parks (Col)

- Colombia won the toss and elected to field.

== Play-offs ==
=== Semi-finals ===
21 October 2023
09:00
Scorecard

Argentina; 154/4 (20 overs)	v	Colombia; 113/9 (20 overs)
Pedro Baron 77 (56); Laurel Parks 2/23 (4 overs)		Anshul Sehrawat 38 (31); Lucas Rossi 2/30 (4 overs)

Argentina won by 41 runs
St. George's College Ground 1, Quilmes
Umpires: Steven Caines (Ber) and Mark McCormack (Ber)
Player of the match: Pedro Baron (Arg)

- Colombia won the toss and elected to field.

21 October 2023
09:00
Scorecard

Mexico; 67 (17.4 overs)	v	Uruguay; 68/5 (15.1 overs)
Puneet Arora 18 (20); Bommineni Ravindra 4/13 (4 overs)		Paneer Saravanan 36 (40); Shantanu Kaveri 3/11 (4 overs)

Uruguay won by 5 wickets
St. George's College Ground 2, Quilmes
Umpires: Andrew Elliott (Eng) and Precious Smith (Ber)
Player of the match: Bommineni Ravindra (Uru)

- Mexico won the toss and elected to bat.

=== 7th place play-off ===
21 October 2023
12:15
Scorecard

Panama; 106/6 (10 overs)	v	Chile; 88/3 (10 overs)
Yusuf Ebrahim 31 (16); Guillermo Aburto 2/13 (2 overs)		John Bartlett 55* (33); Yusuf Ebrahim 1/9 (2 overs)

Panama won by 18 runs
St. George's College Ground 2, Quilmes
Player of the match: Yusuf Ebrahim (Pan)

- Panama won the toss and elected to bat.
- The match was played as a 10-over match due to time restrictions.

=== 5th place play-off ===
21 October 2023
12:15
Scorecard

Brazil; 69/8 (10 overs)	v	Peru; 46/7 (10 overs)
Luis Maximo 21 (11); George Parsons 4/6 (2 overs)		George Parsons 12 (21); Kawsar Khan 1/2 (2 overs)

Brazil won by 23 runs
St. George's College Ground 1, Quilmes
Player of the match: Sayed Hashimi (Bra)

- Peru won the toss and elected to field.
- The match was played as a 10-over match due to time restrictions.

=== 3rd place play-off ===
21 October 2023
15:00
Scorecard

Colombia; 177/5 (20 overs)	v	Mexico; 170/6 (20 overs)
Laurel Parks 80* (45); Pratik Singh Bais 3/16 (4 overs)		Luis Hermida 37* (22); Visuddha Perera 2/26 (4 overs)

Colombia won by 7 runs
St. George's College Ground 2, Quilmes
Umpires: Mark McCormack (Ber) and Precious Smith (Ber)
Player of the match: Laurel Parks (Col)

- Mexico won the toss and elected to field.

=== Final ===
21 October 2023
15:00
Scorecard

Argentina; 116/8 (20 overs)	v	Uruguay; 82 (19 overs)
Guido Angeletti 47 (44); Dhanushraj Arun 2/9 (2 overs)		Paneer Saravanan 26 (34); Santiago Duggan 4/15 (4 overs)

Argentina won by 34 runs
St. George's College Ground 1, Quilmes
Umpires: Steven Caines (Ber) and Andrew Elliott (Eng)
Player of the match: Santiago Duggan (Arg)

- Argentina won the toss and elected to bat.
