= 2018 South American Cricket Championship – Men's tournament =

2018 South American Cricket Championship – Men's event
- Dates: 23 – 26 August 2018
- Cricket format: Twenty20
- Tournament format(s): Round-robin and final
- Host: Colombia
- Champions: Mexico (2nd title)
- Runners-up: Uruguay
- Participants: 8
- Matches: 29

The 2018 South American Cricket Championship was a cricket tournament took place in Mosquera near Bogotá, Colombia from 23 to 26 August 2018. This was the fifteenth edition of the men's South American Cricket Championship. Unlike the women's event, which took place simultaneously, matches played in the men's event did not have official Twenty20 International status. The ICC granted Twenty20 International (T20I) status to matches between all of its Members, starting from 1 July 2018 for women's team but not until 1 January 2019 for the men. Argentina were the defending champions having won the event in 2017, but were represented by a development squad, Argentina A.

The eight participating teams were the national sides of hosts Colombia, along with Argentina A, Brazil, Chile, Mexico, Peru, Uruguay and Costa Rica who were making their debut in the South American Championship. Mexico went undefeated throughout the tournament and defeated Uruguay by six wickets in the final.

== Squads ==
Argentina A	Brazil	Chile	Colombia
Bruno Angeletti; Pedro Arrighi; Pedro Baron; James Drummond; Facundo Duggan; Santiago Duggan; Ramiro Escobar; Jonathan Hurley; Ashish Kumar; Tomas Marinozzi; David Mauro; Lautaro Musiani; Nicolas Serrano; Martín Siri; Neil Upton; Ruann van der Merwe	Fahad Ali; David Anwar; Richard Avery; Kamal Bishnoi; Roginaldo Braga; Greigor Caisley; Robert Donison; Matthew Featherstone; Luiz Goncalves; Nayandatt Manjrekar; Felipe Melo; Surya Rayanan; Muhammad Saleem	Peter Baker; Alex Carthew; Chris Emmott; Kamlesh Gupta; Mohan Khemani; Major Mandy; Michael Meade; Tim Messner; Mayanak Patel; Rolando Rivas; Edward Seisun; Aresh Srivastav; Amit Uniyal; Kiran Venkata; Gabriel Villalobos; Paul Volich	Nick Barsby; Travis Crockett; Jamie Davis; Mark Edelston; Andy Farrington; Chris Laas; Aniket Medellin; Balaji Medellin; Rohit Mohan; Dian Perera; Satnam Sandhu; Matt Shaban; Bittou Singh; Paddy Smallwood; Olly West; Dean Wiltshire
Costa Rica	Mexico	Peru	Uruguay
Aditya Aditya; Sam Arthur; Joel Cutinho; Prajwel Cutinho; Mukesh Gupta; Gaurab Kumar; Daniel Mejia; Karunesh Mishra; Sham Murari; Sudesh Pillai; Christopher Prasad; Sachin Ravikumar; Deepak Rawat; Durga Sonti; Zain ul Tashnam	Revanakumar Ankad; Aman Arora; Pradeep Chandran; Goutham Dhanabalan; Murali Gurunathan; Rama Inampud; Shantanu Kaveri; Kaushal Kumar; Rohit Poojray; Jagrit Raj; Ashwin Rangaraj; Tarun Sharma; Harprit Singh; Matthew Tyler	Matt Astbury; Chris Cannock; Rodrigo Castro; Richard Chatterton; James Dixon; Tim Duncan; Daniel Hall; Alex James; Samarth Narulu; Joaquin Salazar; Tony Sanford; Pravin Shamdasani; Diwan Singh; Jagjit Singh; Matthew Spry; Scott Stevenson; Suresh Suryavanshi; James Williams	Ravindra Bommineni; Gokul G.; Syed Hidhayathullah; Madhu Kanikanti; Gnanesh Kumar; Avijit Mukherjee; Boopathy Ravi; Jashwant Reddy; Ramsoorya Singaram; Shivansh Sitoke; Vijayakumar Srinivasan; Rajat Srivastava; David Sundeep; Sandeep Vanshival; Deeshan Vasagiri

== Round-robin ==
=== Points table ===
Team	P	W	L	T	NR	Pts	NRR
Mexico	7	7	0	0	0	21	+1.383
Uruguay	7	5	2	0	0	15	+0.582
Costa Rica	7	4	3	0	0	12	+0.913
Colombia	7	4	3	0	0	12	+0.289
Peru	7	3	4	0	0	9	–0.937
Brazil	7	2	5	0	0	6	–0.387
Argentina A	7	2	5	0	0	6	–1.420
Chile	7	1	6	0	0	3	–0.750

Advanced to the Final

== Final ==
26 August 2018
13:00
Scorecard

Uruguay; 44 (17 overs)	v	Mexico; 45/4 (10 overs)
Avijit Mukherjee 11 (26); Aman Arora 5/4 (4 overs)		Tarun Sharma 13 (12); Shivansh Sitoke 1/5 (1 over)

Mexico won by 6 wickets
Los Pinos Polo Club, Cundinamarca
Umpires: Oscar Andrade (Ber) and Mohammad Iqbal (Can)

- Mexico won the toss and elected to field.

== See also ==
- 2018 South American Women's Cricket Championship
