= 2022 Men's South American Cricket Championship =

- Dates: 20 – 23 October 2022
- Cricket format: Twenty20
- Tournament format(s): Round-robin and final
- Host: Brazil
- Champions: Argentina (11th title)
- Runners-up: Brazil
- Participants: 7
- Matches: 22
- Player of the series: (Brazil) Kalid Salman
- Most runs: (Brazil) Kalid Salman (288)
- Most wickets: (Brazil) Yasar Haroon (11) (Argentina) Ruann van der Merwe (11)

The 2022 Men's South American Cricket Championship was a cricket tournament that took place in Itaguaí, Brazil from 20 to 23 October 2022. This was the seventeenth edition of the men's South American Cricket Championship, and the second in which matches were eligible for Twenty20 International (T20I) status, since the ICC granted T20I status to Twenty20 matches between all of its members. However, matches played in this edition did not have T20I status.

The seven participating teams were the national sides of hosts Brazil, along with Argentina, Chile, Colombia, Mexico, Peru and Uruguay. Argentina were the defending champions having won the event in 2019.

Before the men's tournament, the Women's South American Championship (13–16 October), as well tournaments for the under-15s and under-19s teams were played in October 2022.

== Squads ==
Argentina	Brazil	Chile	Colombia	Mexico	Peru	Uruguay
Hernán Fennell (c); Bruno Angeletti; Guido Angeletti; Santiago Duggan; Ramiro Escobar (wk); Alejandro Ferguson; Agustin Husain; Santiago Iturbe (wk); Alan Kirschbaum; David Mauro; Augusto Mustafa; Agustin Rivero; Tomas Rossi; Ruann van der Merwe; Martin Villagran	Greigor Caisley (c); Michel Assuncao; Richard Avery; Luiz Goncalves; Yasar Haroon; Mohammed Khan; Arman Hossain (wk); Lucas Maximo; William Maximo; Lucas Pacete; Surya Ramaswamy; Luis Morais; Kalid Salman; Ismat Ullah	Alex Carthew (c); Rajesh Balu; John Bartlett; Guilhermo Contreras; Shoaib Gazi Hossain; Anuj Kumar; Major Mandy; Irfan Mir; Himanshu Panwar; Hirenkumar Patel; Mayank Patel; Hector Pavez; Hamish Pearson; Rolando Rivas; Hardev Singh; Amit Uniyal	Julian Buttigieg (c); Rajakulaje Anuranaga; Nicholas Barby; Travis Crockett; Andrew Farrington; Jason Gutierrez; Hohib Habibzai; Martin Knight; Joe Mansfield; Mukund Pandey; Salim Patel; Chris Price; Chris Payne; Patrick Raikes; Paul Reid; Satnam Sandhu	Tarun Sharma (c); Aman Arora; Puneet Arora; Pratik Bias; Gaurav Dutta; Shantanu Kaveri; Sathish Konapally; Shashikant Laxman; Pradeep Mohanarangam; Dilip Nallapareddy; Abhilash Patil; Rohit Poojary; Praveen Rangasamy; Luis Romero; Harprit Singh; Anurag Tripathi	Hafez Farooq (c); Fahad Ashraf; Harshil Brahbhatt; Erick Cajahuaman; Joel Cubas; Nikhil Deshmukh; Mohsin Hub; Mohsin Husain; Yahan Khan; Rohan Kumar; Manoj Kumar Rana; Joaquin Salazar; Ikram Ali Shah; Pravin Shamdasani; Jagjit Singh; Suresh Suryavanshi	Rahul Sasidharan (c); Dhanushraj Arun; Chandramenan Sivakumar; Soham Gupta (wk); Bharath Kumar; Balagovind Mundarath; Subrat Patra; Rashin Rajendran; Rajendra Rathod; Anand Sasidharan; Yash Sharma; Alistair Sharp; Robert Sharp

== Round-robin ==
=== Points table ===
Pos	Team	Pld	W	L	NR	Pts	NRR	Qualification
1	Brazil	6	5	1	0	10	2.106	Advanced to the final
2	Argentina	6	4	2	0	8	1.250	Advanced to the final
3	Chile	6	4	2	0	8	1.146	
4	Mexico	6	4	2	0	8	0.303	
5	Uruguay	6	2	4	0	4	−2.421	
6	Colombia	6	1	5	0	2	−0.893	
7	Peru	6	1	5	0	2	−1.296	

Source: CricClubs

=== Day one ===
20 October 2022
09:00
Scorecard

Colombia; 123/7 (20 overs)	v	Mexico; 127/6 (18.1 overs)
Martin Knight 58 (52); Pradeep Mohanarangam 3/14 (4 overs)		Pradeep Mohanarangam 55* (37); Paul Reid 2/16 (3 overs)

Mexico won by 4 wickets
Sao Fernando Polo and Cricket Club, Itaguaí
Umpires: Steven Caines (Ber) and Arnold Maddela (Can)
Player of the match: Pradeep Mohanarangam (Mex)

- Colombia won the toss and elected to bat.

20 October 2022
09:00
Scorecard

Peru; 160/7 (20 overs)	v	Chile; 161/0 (15.1 overs)
Fahad Ashraf 109* (60); Amit Uniyal 3/22 (4 overs)		Major Mandy 84* (55)

Chile won by 10 wickets
Sao Fernando Polo and Cricket Club (Campo Sede), Itaguaí
Umpires: Amol Bhatt (Mex) and Emmerson Carrington (Ber)
Player of the match: Fahad Ashraf (Per)

- Peru won the toss and elected to bat.

20 October 2022
09:00
Scorecard

Uruguay; 97/7 (16 overs)	v	Brazil; 101/4 (12.4 overs)
Anand Sasidharan 25 (18); Yasar Haroon 4/15 (4 overs)		Lucas Maximo 26 (23); Dhanushraj Arun 2/25 (2.4 overs)

Brazil won by 6 wickets
Sao Fernando Polo and Cricket Club (Ground 3), Itaguaí
Umpires: Oscar Andrade (Ber) and Roberta Moretti Avery (Bra)
Player of the match: Yasar Haroon (Bra)

- Brazil won the toss and elected to field.
- The match was reduced to 16 overs per side.

20 October 2022
13:00
Scorecard

Argentina; 45 (10.2 overs)	v	Brazil; 46/3 (7.4 overs)
Alejandro Ferguson 14 (13); Kalid Salman 5/6 (2.2 overs)		Yasar Haroon 11* (10); Tomas Rossi 2/24 (3.4 overs)

Brazil won by 7 wickets
Sao Fernando Polo and Cricket Club, Itaguaí
Umpires: Steven Caines (Ber) and Arnold Maddela (Can)
Player of the match: Kalid Salman (Bra)

- Argentina won the toss and elected to bat.

20 October 2022
13:00
Scorecard

Uruguay; 150/6 (20 overs)	v	Chile; 145/9 (20 overs)
Rahul Sasidharan 39 (42); Hirenkumar Patel 2/15 (4 overs)		Hirenkumar Patel 38 (22); Anand Sasidharan 2/17 (4 overs)

Uruguay won by 5 runs
Sao Fernando Polo and Cricket Club (Campo Sede), Itaguaí
Umpires: Amol Bhatt (Mex) and Emmerson Carrington (Ber)
Player of the match: Hirenkumar Patel (Chi)

- Chile won the toss and elected to field.

20 October 2022
13:00
Scorecard

Peru; 180/6 (20 overs)	v	Colombia; 181/5 (18.5 overs)
Pravin Shamdasani 74* (55); Julian Buttigieg 3/9 (4 overs)		Nicholas Barby 72 (37); Suresh Suryavanshi 1/19 (2 overs)

Colombia won by 5 wickets
Sao Fernando Polo and Cricket Club (Ground 3), Itaguaí
Umpires: Oscar Andrade (Ber) and Roberta Moretti Avery (Bra)
Player of the match: Nicholas Barby (Col)

- Colombia won the toss and elected to field.

=== Day two ===
21 October 2022
09:00
Scorecard

Peru; 78 (17.2 overs)	v	Brazil; 80/2 (10.2 overs)
Pravin Shamdasani 25 (28); Yasar Haroon 3/7 (3.2 overs)		Lucas Pacete 34* (31); Jagjit Singh 1/8 (1 over)

Brazil won by 8 wickets
Sao Fernando Polo and Cricket Club, Itaguaí
Player of the match: Yasar Haroon (Bra)

- Peru won the toss and elected to bat.

21 October 2022
09:00
Scorecard

Argentina; 186/4 (20 overs)	v	Uruguay; 53 (12.3 overs)
Alan Kirschbaum 65* (28); Rahul Sasidharan 2/26 (4 overs)		Soham Gupta 20 (12); Hernán Fennell 4/9 (4 overs)

Argentina won by 133 runs
Sao Fernando Polo and Cricket Club (Campo Sede), Itaguaí
Player of the match: Alan Kirschbaum (Arg)

- Uruguay won the toss and elected to field.

21 October 2022
09:00
Scorecard

Mexico; 170/7 (20 overs)	v	Chile; 172/1 (17.3 overs)
Shashikant Laxman 46 (33); John Bartlett 1/10 (1 over)		Major Mandy 77* (45); Aman Arora 1/35 (4 overs)

Chile won by 9 wickets
Sao Fernando Polo and Cricket Club (Ground 3), Itaguaí
Player of the match: Major Mandy (Chi)

- Chile won the toss and elected to field.

21 October 2022
13:00
Scorecard

Argentina; 180/8 (20 overs)	v	Chile; 172/5 (20 overs)
Tomas Rossi 54 (24); Anuj Kumar 2/26 (4 overs)		Hirenkumar Patel 76 (40); Alan Kirschbaum 2/44 (4 overs)

Argentina won by 8 runs
Sao Fernando Polo and Cricket Club, Itaguaí
Player of the match: Hirenkumar Patel (Chi)

- Chile won the toss and elected to field.

21 October 2022
13:00
Scorecard

Brazil; 149/6 (20 overs)	v	Mexico; 124/8 (20 overs)
Luiz Goncalves 27 (15); Aman Arora 3/25 (4 overs)		Praveen Rangasamy 26 (15); Richard Avery 2/20 (4 overs)

Brazil won by 25 runs
Sao Fernando Polo and Cricket Club (Campo Sede), Itaguaí
Player of the match: Yasar Haroon (Bra)

- Mexico won the toss and elected to field.

21 October 2022
13:00
Scorecard

Colombia; 133/9 (20 overs)	v	Uruguay; 134/4 (19.4 overs)
Mukund Pandey 26 (22); Anand Sasidharan 3/16 (4 overs)		Alistair Sharp 56 (60); Martin Knights 2/19 (2.4 overs)

Uruguay won by 6 wickets
Sao Fernando Polo and Cricket Club (Ground 3), Itaguaí
Player of the match: Hohib Habibzai (Col)

- Colombia won the toss and elected to bat.

=== Day three ===
22 October 2022
09:00
Scorecard

Colombia; 136/5 (20 overs)	v	Brazil; 139/4 (16 overs)
Salim Patel 60* (40); Luis Morais 3/18 (4 overs)		Kalid Salman 83* (48); Julian Buttigieg 1/18 (2 overs)

Brazil won by 6 wickets
Sao Fernando Polo and Cricket Club, Itaguaí
Player of the match: Kalid Salman (Bra)

- Brazil won the toss and elected to field.

22 October 2022
09:00
Scorecard

Peru; 185/3 (20 overs)	v	Uruguay; 115 (18.4 overs)
Pravin Shamdasani 67* (41); Subrat Patra 1/26 (4 overs)		Balagovind Mundarath; Jagjit Singh 3/6 (2 overs)

Peru won by 70 runs
Sao Fernando Polo and Cricket Club (Campo Sede), Itaguaí
Player of the match: Pravin Shamdasani (Per)

- Uruguay won the toss and elected to field.

22 October 2022
09:00
Scorecard

Argentina; 155 (18.5 overs)	v	Mexico; 156/6 (19.3 overs)
Alan Kirschbaum 45 (24); Pradeep Mohanarangam 2/15 (4 overs)		Praveen Rangasamy 42 (27); Ruann van der Merwe 2/23 (4 overs)

Mexico won by 4 wickets
Sao Fernando Polo and Cricket Club (Ground 3), Itaguaí
Player of the match: Alan Kirschbaum (Arg)

- Mexico won the toss and elected to field.

22 October 2022
13:00
Scorecard

Peru; 115/9 (20 overs)	v	Mexico; 116/5 (18.5 overs)
Pravin Shamdasani 34 (30); Dilip Nallapareddy 2/13 (4 overs)		Puneet Arora 47* (36); Jagjit Singh 2/14 (4 overs)

Mexico won by 5 wickets
Sao Fernando Polo and Cricket Club, Itaguaí
Player of the match: Pravin Shamdasani (Per)

- Mexico won the toss and elected to field.

22 October 2022
13:00
Scorecard

Colombia; 158/7 (20 overs)	v	Argentina; 159/4 (18.3 overs)
Julian Buttigieg 49 (26); Tomas Rossi 3/24 (4 overs)		Augusto Mustafa 88 (55); Nicholas Barby 2/21 (4 overs)

Argentina won by 6 wickets
Sao Fernando Polo and Cricket Club (Campo Sede), Itaguaí
Player of the match: Augusto Mustafa (Arg)

- Argentina won the toss and elected to field.

22 October 2022
13:00
Scorecard

Brazil; 169/6 (20 overs)	v	Chile; 170/3 (16.2 overs)
Kalid Salman 103 (59); Anuj Kumar 4/26 (4 overs)		Hardev Singh 45* (26); Lucas Pacete 2/29 (3 overs)

Chile won by 7 wickets
Sao Fernando Polo and Cricket Club (Ground 3), Itaguaí
Player of the match: Kalid Salman (Bra)

- Chile won the toss and elected to field.

=== Day four ===
23 October 2022
09:00
Scorecard

Chile; 196/5 (20 overs)	v	Colombia; 152/8 (20 overs)
Hirenkumar Patel 58 (30); Andrew Farrington 2/35 (4 overs)		Salim Patel 46 (23); Alex Carthew 3/27 (4 overs)

Chile won by 44 runs
Sao Fernando Polo and Cricket Club, Itaguaí
Player of the match: Hirenkumar Patel (Chi)

- Chile won the toss and elected to bat.

23 October 2022
09:00
Scorecard

Uruguay; 121/9 (20 overs)	v	Mexico; 122/5 (13.3 overs)
Soham Gupta 36 (35); Aman Arora 4/16 (4 overs)		Puneet Arora 47 (25); Dhanushraj Arun 2/18 (2 overs)

Mexico won by 5 wickets
Sao Fernando Polo and Cricket Club (Campo Sede), Itaguaí
Player of the match: Puneet Arora (Mex)

- Mexico won the toss and elected to field.

23 October 2022
09:00
Scorecard

Argentina; 196/8 (20 overs)	v	Peru; 114 (18.2 overs)
Alejandro Ferguson 82 (52); Jagjit Singh 3/25 (4 overs)		Pravin Shamdasani 29 (18); Hernán Fennell 3/23 (4 overs)

Argentina won by 82 runs
Sao Fernando Polo and Cricket Club (Ground 3), Itaguaí
Player of the match: Alejandro Ferguson (Arg)

- Argentina won the toss and elected to bat.

== Final ==
23 October 2022
13:30
Scorecard

Argentina; 227/5 (20 overs)	v	Brazil; 217 (20 overs)
Tomas Rossi 95* (44); Kalid Salman 1/26 (4 overs)		Kalid Salman 58 (27); Guido Angeletti 3/21 (2 overs)

Argentina won by 10 runs
Sao Fernando Polo and Cricket Club (Ground 3), Itaguaí
Player of the match: Tomas Rossi (Arg)

- Brazil won the toss and elected to field.

== See also ==
- 2022 Women's South American Cricket Championship
