= List of Peru Twenty20 International cricketers =

This is a list of Peruvian Twenty20 International cricketers. In April 2018, the ICC decided to grant full Twenty20 International (T20I) status to all its members. Therefore, all Twenty20 matches played between Peru and other ICC members after 1 January 2019 had the T20I status.

This list comprises all members of the Peru cricket team who have played at least one T20I match. It is initially arranged in the order in which each player won his first Twenty20 cap. Where more than one player won their first Twenty20 cap in the same match, those players are listed alphabetically by surname. Peru played their first T20I matches during the 2019 South American Cricket Championship in October 2019.

== Key ==
General

- ‡ – Captain
- † – Wicket-keeper
- First – Year of debut
- Last – Year of latest game
- Mat – Number of matches played

Batting

- Runs – Runs scored in career
- HS – Highest score
- Avg – Runs scored per dismissal
- 50 – Number of half centuries
- * – Batsman remained not out

Bowling

- Balls – Balls bowled in career
- Wkt – Wickets taken in career
- BBI – Best bowling in an innings
- Ave – Average runs per wicket

Fielding

- Ca – Catches taken
- St – Stumpings affected

== List of players ==
Statistics are correct as of 8 August 2026.

Peru T20I cricketers
General					Batting				Bowling				Fielding		Ref
No.	Name	First	Last	Mat	Runs	HS	Avg	50	Balls	Wkt	BBI	Ave	Ca	St	Ref
1	Hafez Farooq	2019	2019	4	69	24	17.25	0	12	2	2/14	7.00	1	0	
2	Steven Hallett†	2019	2019	4	10	5	2.50	0	–	–	–	–	4	1	
3	Jagjit Singh	2019	2019	4	24	12	6.00	0	6	0	–	–	5	0	
4	Christopher Mahoney	2019	2019	3	21	21	21.00	0	6	0	–	–	0	0	
5	Oliver Marshall	2019	2019	3	0	0	0.00	0	18	1	1/10	22.00	1	0	
6	Mohsin Hub	2019	2019	4	36	16*	12.00	0	54	2	1/14	19.50	0	0	
7	Joaquin Salazar	2019	2026	5	50	20*	12.50	0	–	–	–	–	2	0	
8	Shaikh Ashraf	2019	2019	4	82	38	20.50	0	24	1	1/18	34.00	2	0	
9	Pravin Shamdasani	2019	2026	7	109	37	21.80	0	72	6	2/8	11.66	2	0	
10	Matthew Spry‡	2019	2019	4	5	3*	5.00	0	60	7	4/8	8.85	0	0	
11	Waqar Khan	2019	2019	4	2	2*	2.00	0	78	8	3/21	10.75	1	0	
12	Diego de la Puente	2019	2019	2	3	2*	3.00	0	–	–	–	–	0	0	
13	Suresh Kumar	2019	2026	5	37	25	11.00	0	90	5	2/23	24.80	0	0	
14	Harshil Brahmbhatt	2026	2026	3	76	43	25.33	0	46	4	2/27	13.75	1	0	
15	Ramses Cespedes	2026	2026	3	4	4	4.00	0	18	0	–	–	0	0	
16	Richard Chatterton	2026	2026	3	1	1	0.50	0	66	5	3/26	15.80	0	0	
17	Joel Cubas	2026	2026	3	3	2	1.50	0	–	–	–	–	1	0	
18	Roshan De Silva	2026	2026	3	23	21	11.50	0	–	–	–	–	3	0	
19	Nikhil Deshmukh	2026	2026	3	11	9	3.66	0	28	1	1/18	25.00	3	0	
20	Ross Hardie†	2026	2026	3	2	1*	–	0	–	–	–	–	0	1	
21	Roshan Punjabi	2026	2026	3	16	16*	16.00	0	–	–	–	–	0	0	
