= Cricket Peru =

Peru
International Cricket Council
- ICC status: Affiliate member (2007)
- ICC region: Americas

International cricket
- First international: South American Championship, 1997, Opponent Brazil. First official ICC game Feb 2007 in Americas Division 3 Tournament – Opponent Turks and Caicos Islands (Eventual winners).
- As of 17 July 2015

The Asociación Peruana de Cricket or Cricket Peru is the official governing body of the sport of cricket in Peru. Cricket Peru is Peru's representative at the International Cricket Council and is an associate member and has been a member of that body since 2007. It is included in the ICC Americas region.

Cricket has been played in Peru for over 150 years, at the Lima Cricket & Football Club (LCFC), and is now undergoing resurgence as a recently admitted Affiliate Member of the International Cricket Council (ICC) and a founding member of Cricket South America (CSA), along with Argentina, Brazil and Chile. It is also a member of ICC Americas.

== See also ==
- Peru national cricket team
- Peru women's national cricket team
