= David Hays (cricketer) =

Scottish cricketer (1944–2025)

Personal information
- Full name: David Leslie Hays
- Born: 5 November 1944; Finchley, Middlesex, England
- Died: 27 August 2025 (aged 80); Milltimber, Aberdeen, Scotland
- Batting: Right-handed
- Role: Wicket-keeper

Domestic team information
- Years: Team
- 1965–1968: Cambridge University
- 1976: Middlesex

Career statistics
Competition	First-class	List A
Matches	25	1
Runs scored	751	40
Batting average	16.32	40.00
100s/50s	0/3	0/0
Top score	72	40
Catches/stumpings	26/2	0/0
- Source: Cricinfo, 31 August 2025

David Leslie Hays (5 November 1944 – 27 August 2025) was an English-born Scottish cricketer.

== Biography ==
David Hays was educated at Highgate and Selwyn College, Cambridge. He represented Cambridge University (two blues) and Scotland in 25 first-class matches as a right-handed batsman and wicketkeeper between 1965 and 1980. He appeared in one limited-overs match for Middlesex in 1976, scoring 40.

Hays worked as an executive in the Scottish oil industry. He died in Milltimber on 27 August 2025, aged 80.
