= Uruguay national cricket team =

Flag of Uruguay

The Uruguay national cricket team represents Uruguay in international cricket matches. They have mainly played against regional rivals Argentina, playing against them 29 times between 1868 and World War II, winning on six occasions.

In 2018, the team finished in second place, behind Mexico, in the annual South American Cricket Championship held in Colombia. In 2023, the team finished in second place in the South American Cricket Championship held in Buenos Aires, Argentina.

== History ==
The Victoria Cricket Club was established as far back as 1842. Far away from home, in distant Montevideo, the expatriate Englishmen had yearned to play the familiar sports of their land. Hence, the local Uruguayans passing by often saw the foreigners indulging in the strange game of willow and leather.

In 1861, the Victoria Cricket Club was re-established as the Montevideo Cricket Club (MVCC), and like any other Latin American cricket club, it branched into rugby, football, and gradually field hockey and tennis. In the World Rugby Museum of Twickenham, MVCC is listed as the eighth oldest rugby union club in the world, the oldest outside Europe.

Cricket did maintain a toehold as well. In 1868, the Montevideo Cricket Club played against Argentina’s Buenos Aires Cricket Club in their home ground La Blanqueda, marking the first international match in South America.

Ten years later, the club took on the crew of a visiting vessel in a football game — the first such match played in the land. And with that cricket took a backseat in the country. However, the cricket teams of Montevideo — formed by appending a few players to the Montevideo Cricket Club — did take part in two matches against English sides.

The first was played at the Blanqueda ground over two days during the festival period in 1926, against a reasonably strong Marylebone Cricket Club (MCC) side. A figure as notable as Plum Warner led the team. Although 53 at that time, he was after all a former England captain. The team was loaded with experienced First-Class cricketers. Gubby Allen sat out for the match against Montevideo, but there was the England left-arm spinner Jack White and his guile was a bit too much for the local batsmen to handle.

MCC batted first and Irish-born Hampshire batsman Tom Jameson notched up a hundred. Guy Jackson of Derbyshire and Warner hit half centuries before the innings was closed at 366 for seven. Not all the bowlers were butchered, though. The impressive medium pacer HL Pennock picked up five for 107.

In response, Montevideo’s innings lasted only 19.3 overs. White was too classy for the local talent and only Pennock managed to enter double figures by scoring 12. White’s figures read seven for 27 in 9.3 overs and the total stuttered and stumbled to reach 64.

In the second innings, the home side did little better. Jameson, now enjoying himself with the ball, picked up five wickets. A lot of the bowling was also done by Lord Dunglass, the least accomplished cricketer of the side. But this minor cricketer, who answered to the full name Alec Douglas-Home and later became the Prime Minister of Britain, captured four wickets. The hosts folded for just 98 on Christmas Day.

The next major match for the Montevideo side was played in January 1938 on the same Blanqueda ground. It was against a strong English side led by Sir Theodore Brickman. The team boasted several big names – including celebrated ageing stalwarts like Andy Sandham and RES Wyatt, as well as other Test stars like Jim Sims, Arthur Wood, Jack Durston and Fred Price.

However, the home bowlers did an appreciable job in restricting the visiting batsmen. Fifties by Wyatt and the Warwickshire veteran Reg Santall helped to take Sir Theodore Brickman’s XI to 280. Pennock, still going strong after 11 years, captured three wickets. The bowlers were helped along by some cavalier batting as well, and the runs were plundered in just 36overs.

However, the batting of the home side was too brittle to capitalise on the good work. Eddie Watts, the Surrey teammate of Alf Gover and also his brother-in-law, ran through the batting with able help from Wyatt and the occasional fare of Sandham. The 80 runs that the home side scored came in just 11 overs. It was fireworks all around.

In the second innings, Wyatt plundered 187, with minor counties batsman Harold Dods blasting another hundred. As many as 411 runs were amassed in just 50.1 overs before Sir Brickman declared the innings. Poor Pennock gave away 106 runs in nine overs, although he had the consolation of accounting for Wyatt and Watts.

With the target a staggering 600, the hosts surrendered to Jim Sims whose legbreaks bamboozled seven batsmen in the space of eight overs. In a curious coincidence, Sims finished with seven for 27, the same figures Jack White had achieved 11 years earlier. The hosts were skittled for 124, losing by 475 runs. Since then, the cricketers of Uruguay have never really played against a major cricketing power. Even in the South American scene, they have been left far behind by Argentina.

=== Indian cricketers in Uruguay ===
Many workers at Tata Consultancy Services are native Indians and play cricket; so, the Uruguayan national cricket team is revealingly made up of South Asians.

== Current squad ==
Current squad:

- Paneer Saravanan, R/H Batsman
- Avijit M, R/H Batsmen, R/A Bowler Medium
- Beerbal MA, R/H Batsmen, R/A Bowler Fast
- Boopathy Ravi, R/H Batsmen, R/A Bowler Fast
- David Sundeep, R/H Batsmen, Wicket-keeper, L/A Bowler Slow
- Soham Gupta, R/H Batsmen, Wicket-keeper, R/A Bowler Spin (VC)
- Sunil Patil, R/H Batsmen, Wicket-keeper,
- Bharath Kumar Ravichandran, R/H Batsmen,
- Yash Sharma, R/H Batsmen, R/A Spin
- Karan, R/H Batsmen, R/A Bowler Medium Fast
- Anand Sasidharan, R/H Batsmen, R/A Bowler Medium
- Subrat Kumar, R/H Batsmen, R/A Bowler Medium
- Ravindra Bommineni, R/H Batsmen, R/A Bowler Medium (C)
- Himanshu Pundhir, R/H Batsmen, R/A Bowler Medium Fast
- Saravanan Krishnamurthy, R/H Batsmen, R/A Bowler Orthodox
- Rashin Raj, R/H Batsmen, R/A Bowler
- Dhanush Raj, R/H Batsmen, R/A Bowler Medium
- Bala Govind, R/H Batsmen, R/A Bowler

== Future plans ==
The Uruguayan Cricket Association has many plans for the future and working hard for augmenting cricket in Latin soil. In December, the team will travel to Buenos Aires to play a game against Argentina. It will be in commemoration of the first confrontation that both countries had in cricket, 150 years ago. The rematch will be in Montevideo.

== Tournament history ==
=== South American Championship ===
- 2017: 4th place
- 2018: 2nd place
- 2019: 5th place
- 2022: 5th place
- 2023: 2nd place
- 2024: 8th place
