= South American Cricket Championship =

International cricket tournament in South America

South American Championship
- Administrator: ICC Americas
- Format: Limited-overs cricket
- First edition: Men: 1995; Women: 2007
- Latest edition: Men: 2025; Women: 2025
- Current champion: Men: Brazil (2026 – 1st title); Women: Brazil (2025 – 7th title)
- Most successful: Men: Argentina (Note: From 2000 to 2018, Argentina was represented by its A team (development team).) (12 titles); Women: Argentina and Brazil (7 titles each)

The South American Cricket Championship (Spanish: Campeonato Sudamericano de Críquet; Portuguese: Campeonato Sul-Americano de Críquete) is an international limited-overs cricket tournament featuring national teams from South America and other invited national sides from outside South America, currently played annually but until 2013 was usually played every two years. The first men's event was held in 1995 and a women's tournament started in 2007.

The Argentine national team won the first three championships without losing a game, and subsequently the country was represented by a development squad, Argentina A, between 2000 and 2018. Guyana, the only Test-playing country in South America (as part of the West Indies cricket team), had sent a team four times, winning twice, but this has generally been a "masters" team consisting of past players. Colombia were going to send a team to the 2000 tournament, but in fact did not debut until 2015. The non-South American teams invited to the tournament have been Panama (in 2000), Puerto Rico (in 2004), Costa Rica (in 2018) and Mexico (since 2014). The thirteenth edition of the tournament was held in Itaguaí, Rio de Janeiro State, Brazil, in October 2016. Chile won the men's tournament and Brazil won the women's tournament. The 2018 Championships were awarded to Colombia for the first time, and took place over 4 days in August with Mexico emerging as champions for the second time. Mexico won the men's event for the second time in 2018, and Argentina won again in 2019. Panama are the current champions, having won the 2024 edition.

Argentina also dominated the women's event by winning on seven occasions. From 2018, all women's matches between ICC member nations have the Twenty20 International (T20I) status after the ICC decided to grant T20I status to all matches involving its members from 1 January 2019. Brazil's women team won the first edition with this enhanced status. Starting from the 2019 edition, the same status would apply to the men's event. The only non-ICC playing nations in 2019 were Colombia and Uruguay.

== Results (Men's) ==
| Year | Host(s) | Venue(s) | Result | | |
| Year | Host(s) | Venue(s) | Winner | Margin | Runner-up |
|---|---|---|---|---|---|
| 1995 | Argentina | Buenos Aires | Argentina; 12 points | Argentina won on points table | Chile; 8 points |
| 1997 | Argentina | Buenos Aires | Argentina; 12 points | Argentina won on points table | Brazil; 4 points |
| 1999 | Peru | Lima | Argentina; 135/2 (28.3 overs) | Argentina won by 8 wickets scorecard | Guyana (Note: When Guyana (who play Test cricket as part of the West Indies Cricket Board) have featured in the tournament, they have been represented by an overage team – the Guyana Masters.); 134 (38.4 overs) |
| 2000 | Argentina | Buenos Aires | Argentina; 77/2 (16 overs) | Argentina won by 8 wickets report | Chile; 75 (? overs) |
| 2002 | Argentina | Buenos Aires | Argentina; 196/8 (28.3 overs) | Argentina won by 2 wickets scorecard | Chile; 194 (40 overs) |
| 2004 | Chile | Santiago | Guyana; 323/3 (40 overs) | Guyana won by 117 runs scorecard | Puerto Rico; 206/7 (40 overs) |
| 2007 | Peru | Lima | Guyana; 204 (39.1 overs) | Guyana won by 150 runs scorecard | Argentina; 54 (28.4 overs) |
| 2009 | Brazil | São Paulo | Argentina; 12 points | Argentina won on points table | Chile; 8 points |
| 2011 | Chile | Santiago | Chile; 173/6 (20 overs) | Chile won by 47 runs report | Argentina; 126/9 (20 overs) |
| 2013 | Argentina | Buenos Aires | Argentina; 12 points | Argentina won on points report | Chile; 8 points |
| 2014 | Peru | Lima | Mexico; 154/4 (20 overs) | Mexico won by 20 runs report | Chile; 134 (19.1 overs) |
| 2015 | Chile | Santiago | Argentina; 137/2 (14.2 overs) | Argentina won by 8 wickets scorecard | Brazil; 135/6 (20 overs) |
| 2016 | Brazil | Itaguaí | Chile; 164/8 (19.4 overs) | Chile won by 2 wickets scorecard | Argentina; 163/7 (20 overs) |
| 2017 | Argentina | Buenos Aires | Argentina; 138/3 (15.3 overs) | Argentina won by 7 wickets scorecard | Chile; 132/8 (20 overs) |
| 2018 | Colombia | Bogota - Mosquera | Mexico; 45/4 (10 overs) | Mexico won by 6 wickets scorecard | Uruguay; 44/10 (17 overs) |
| 2019 | Peru | Lima | Argentina; 111/6 (18.4 overs) | Argentina won by 4 wickets scorecard | Mexico; 105/9 (20 overs) |
| 2022 | Brazil | Itaguaí | Argentina; 227/5 (20 overs) | Argentina won by 10 runs scorecard | Brazil; 217 (20 overs) |
| 2023 | Argentina | Buenos Aires | Argentina; 116/8 (20 overs) | Argentina won by 34 runs scorecard | Uruguay; 82 (19 overs) |
| 2024 | Brazil | Itaguaí | Panama; 128 (19.1 overs) | Panama won by 26 runs scorecard | Brazil; 102/9 (20 overs) |
| 2025 | Brazil | Itaguaí | Mexico; 9 points | Mexico won on points table | Panama; 8 points |
| 2026 | Colombia | Cundinamarca | Brazil; 128/7 (20 overs) | Brazil won by 3 runs scorecard | Panama; 125/5 (20 overs) |

== Performance by team (Men's) ==
Legend

- 1st – Champions
- 2nd – Runners-up
- 3rd – Third place
- GS – Group stage
- SF – Semi-finalists
- — Hosts

| Team | (Argentina) 1995 | (Argentina) 1997 | (Peru) 1999 | (Argentina) 2000 | (Argentina) 2002 | (Chile) 2004 | (Peru) 2007 | (Brazil) 2009 | (Chile) 2011 | (Argentina) 2013 | (Peru) 2014 | (Chile) 2015 | (Brazil) 2016 | (Argentina) 2017 | (Colombia) 2018 | (Peru) 2019 | (Brazil) 2022 | (Argentina) 2023 | (Brazil) 2024 | (Brazil) 2025 | (Brazil) 2026 | Total 21 |
| Andean Masters | — | — | — | — | 4th | GS | — | — | 4th | — | — | — | — | — | — | — | — | — | — | — | — | 3 |
| Argentina | 1st | 1st | 1st | 1st | 1st | 3rd | 2nd | 1st | 2nd | 1st | 5th | 1st | 2nd | 1st | 7th | 1st | 1st | 1st | 3rd | — | — | 19 |
| Brazil | 4th | 2nd | GS | 3rd | 3rd | GS | 4th | 3rd | — | 3rd | 3rd | 2nd | 4th | 3rd | 6th | 6th | 2nd | 5th | 2nd | 3rd | 1st | 20 |
| Chile | 2nd | 4th | 3rd | 2nd | 2nd | 4th | 3rd | 2nd | 1st | 2nd | 2nd | 3rd | 1st | 2nd | 8th | 7th | 3rd | 8th | 6th | — | — | 19 |
| Chile A | — | — | — | — | — | GS | — | — | — | — | — | — | — | — | — | — | — | — | — | — | — | 1 |
| Colombia | — | — | — | — | — | — | — | — | — | — | — | 4th | 5th | 7th | 4th | 4th | 6th | 3rd | 7th | 4th | SF | 10 |
| Costa Rica | — | — | — | — | — | — | — | — | — | — | — | — | — | — | 3rd | — | — | — | — | — | — | 1 |
| Ecuador | — | — | — | — | — | — | GS | — | — | — | — | — | — | — | — | — | — | — | — | — | — | 1 |
| Guyana | — | — | 2nd | 5th | — | 1st | 1st | — | — | — | — | — | — | — | — | — | — | — | — | — | — | 4 |
| Mexico | — | — | — | — | — | — | — | — | — | — | 1st | 5th | 6th | 6th | 1st | 2nd | 4th | 4th | 4th | 1st | 5th | 11 |
| Panama | — | — | — | 4th | — | — | — | — | — | — | — | — | — | — | — | — | — | 7th | 1st | 2nd | 2nd | 4 |
| Peru | 3rd | 3rd | 4th | 6th | — | GS | GS | 4th | 3rd | 4th | 4th | 6th | 3rd | 5th | 5th | 3rd | 7th | 6th | 5th | 6th | 6th | 20 |
| Puerto Rico | — | — | — | — | — | 2nd | — | — | — | — | — | — | — | — | — | — | — | — | — | — | — | 1 |
| Turks and Caicos Islands | — | — | — | — | — | — | — | — | — | — | — | — | — | — | — | — | — | — | — | — | SF | 1 |
| Uruguay | — | — | — | — | — | — | — | — | — | — | — | — | — | 4th | 2nd | 5th | 5th | 2nd | 8th | 5th | — | 7 |
| Venezuela | — | — | GS | 7th | — | — | — | — | — | — | — | — | — | — | — | — | — | — | — | — | — | 2 |

== Performance by team (Women's) ==
Legend

- 1st – Champions
- 2nd – Runners-up
- 3rd – Third place
- P – Participated, position not known
- T – Participated, but games not counted towards the South American Championship
- Q – Entered
- — Hosts

| Team | (Brazil) 2007 | (Argentina) 2009 | (Chile) 2010 | (Brazil) 2011 | (Argentina) 2013 | (Peru) 2014 | (Chile) 2015 | (Brazil) 2016 | (Argentina) 2017 | (Colombia) 2018 | (Peru) 2019 | (Brazil) 2022 | (Argentina) 2023 (Note: The 2023 series between Argentina and Chile was not officially an edition of the Women's South American Championship.) | (Brazil) 2024 | (Brazil) 2025 | (Brazil) 2026 | Total 16 |
| Argentina | 1st | 1st | 1st | 1st | 1st | 1st | 2nd | 2nd | 1st | — | 2nd | 2nd | 1st | 2nd | 2nd (Note: In 2025, Argentina was represented by its A team.) | — | 14 |
| Brazil | 2nd | 2nd | 2nd | P | P | P | 1st | 1st | 2nd | 1st | 1st | 1st (Note: Brazil won the South American Championship before losing to Canada in the final of the Americas Championship.) | — | 1st | 1st | 1st | 15 |
| Canada | — | — | — | — | — | — | — | — | — | — | — | T (Note: Canada's matches did not have T20I status, and were only counted towards the Americas Championship. Canada won the Americas Championship, defeating Brazil in the final.) | — | — | — | — | 1 |
| Cayman Islands | — | — | — | — | — | — | — | — | — | — | — | — | — | 3rd | — | — | 1 |
| Chile | — | — | 3rd | P | P | – | 3rd | — | 3rd | 2nd | 3rd | — | 2nd | — | — | 3rd | 9 |
| Costa Rica | — | — | — | — | — | — | — | — | — | — | — | – | — | — | — | 2nd | 1 |
| Mexico | — | — | — | — | — | — | — | — | — | 4th | 4th | — | — | 4th | — | — | 3 |
| Peru | — | — | — | P | — | P | 4th | 3rd | 4th | 3rd | 5th | 3rd | — | — | — | — | 8 |
