= St. George's College, Quilmes =

Private boarding school in Argentina

St George's College

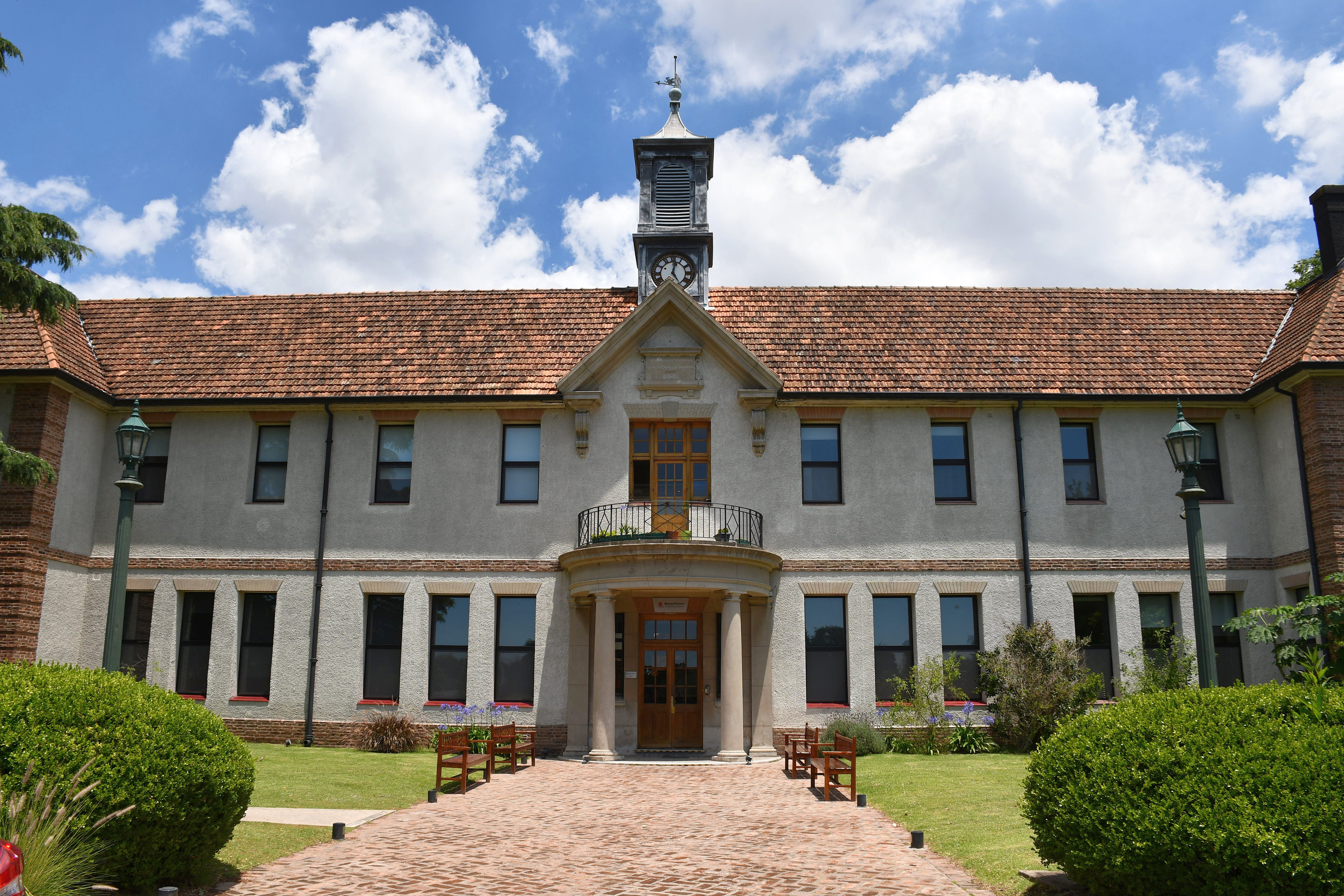
- Main building of the school

Location
- Guido 800; Greater Buenos Aires; Quilmes, Buenos Aires Province; Argentina
- Coordinates: 34.72530089999999°S 58.24362159999998°W

Information
- Funding type: Private
- Motto: Vestigia nulla retrorsum (No footsteps leading backwards)
- Patron saint: Saint George
- Founded: 1898; 128 years ago
- Founder: Reverend J. T. Stevenson
- Status: Open
- Sister school: St George's College North
- Chairman: John Lees
- Headmaster: James Diver
- Gender: Co-educational
- Age: 3 to 17
- Student to teacher ratio: 22:1
- Hours in school day: 8
- Campuses: 1
- Campus size: 27 hectares
- Colors: Red, Blue, White
- Sports: Rugby union, field hockey, swimming, athletics, football, basketball, cricket, golf, tennis
- Yearbook: The Georgian
- Alumni: Old Georgians

St George's College is a private, bilingual, co-educational learning institution located in Quilmes, province of Buenos Aires, Argentina. It was founded in 1898.

== Sports ==
The school's main sports are rugby union and women's field hockey. Apart from those activities, St. George's also hosts association football, athletics, basketball, cricket, golf, swimming, tennis, handball and volleyball.

St George's College Ground
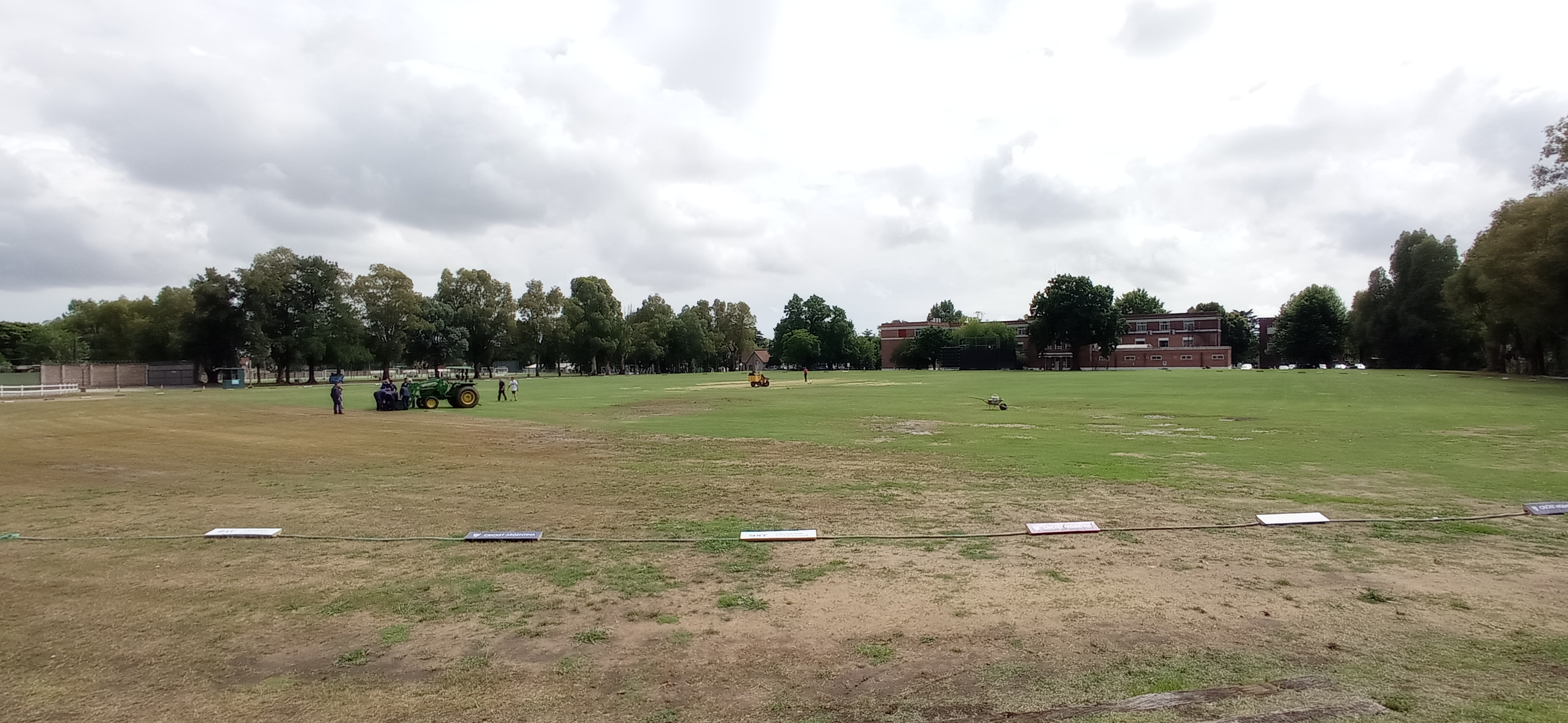
- The main oval in 2024
- Interactive map of St George's College Ground

Ground information
- Location: Quilmes, Buenos Aires, Argentina
- Tenants: Argentina national cricket team

International information
- First T20I: 18 October 2023: Chile v Mexico
- Last T20I: 16 December 2024: Argentina v Brazil
- As of 16 December 2024; Source: St George's College Ground Cricinfo

St George's College Ground 2
- Interactive map of St George's College Ground 2

Ground information
- Location: Quilmes, Buenos Aires, Argentina
- Tenants: Argentina national cricket team

International information
- As of 21 October 2023; Source: St George's College Ground 2 Cricinfo

St George's College Ground 3
- Interactive map of St George's College Ground 3

Ground information
- Location: Quilmes, Buenos Aires, Argentina
- Tenants: Argentina national cricket team

International information
- As of 21 October 2023; Source: St George's College Ground 3 Cricinfo

== Notable alumni ==
=== Alumni ===
Alumni of the school, known as Old Georgians, include Rhodes Scholars who attended Oxford, Cambridge, and Ivy League universities in the United States. In 1921, the Old Georgians Association was formed.

- Peter Prescott, barrister
- Sir Robert Malpas (born 1927), engineer and industrialist
- Sir Alasdair Neil Primrose, 4th Baronet (1935–1986), schoolmaster
- Nicolas Aguzin, CEO of Hong Kong Exchanges and Clearing Limited

=== Masters ===
- Aimé Félix Tschiffely (1895–1954) writer and adventurer, taught at the school in the 1920s

== Media coverage ==
The school provides the backdrop to the film The Penguin Lessons.

== See also ==
- Old Georgian Club
