= Chile national cricket team =

Chile
- Association: Chilean Cricket Association

Personnel
- Captain: Alexander Carthew
- Coach: Interim

International Cricket Council
- ICC status: Associate member (2017)
- ICC region: Americas
ICC Rankings	Current	Best-ever
T20I	---	59th (2 May 2019)

International cricket
- First international: v. Argentina at Santiago, Chile; 1893

T20 Internationals
- First T20I: v. Brazil at El Cortijo Polo Club, Lima; 3 October 2019
- Last T20I: v. Argentina at St. George's College Ground 1, Quilmes; 20 October 2023
T20Is	Played	Won/Lost
Total	6	1/5 (0 ties, 0 no result)
This year	0	0/0 (0 ties, 0 no result)
One-day kit
- As of 1 January 2024

The Chile national cricket team is the team that represents Chile in international cricket. The team is organised by the Chilean Cricket Association, which became an affiliate member of the International Cricket Council (ICC) in 2001 and an associate member in 2017. However, the national side had debuted as early as 1893, when it played Argentina in Santiago. Chile began playing regular international matches in the early 1920s, and, with the exception of a gap during World War II, has continued to do so. Until the team affiliated with the ICC, its opponents were almost all other South American teams. It first participated in an ICC tournament in 2006, when it fielded a team in division three of the 2006 ICC Americas Championship. In the South American Championships, which began in 1995, Chile has participated in every edition, but won only twice, in 2011 & 2016.

== History ==
Cricket was first played in the country in 1829 and the first club, the Valparaíso Cricket Club was formed in 1860. Their first international fixture was played in 1893 against Argentina. Chile provided two players to the South American combined cricket team which toured England in 1932 (playing several first-class matches) – Alfred Jackson and Charles Sutton.

Interest in the game had waned after the Second World War, although a national side continued to play regular matches, and Chile did not become a member of the International Cricket Council until 2002. .

Their first ICC tournament was the Division Three tournament of the ICC Americas Championship, played in Suriname in February 2006. Coached by Arjun Menon, the Chileans finished in third place, their only win coming against Brazil.

The February 2008 edition of the Division 3 tournament was held in Argentina. Chile defeated Belize, Turks & Caicos Islands and Peru only to lose to Brazil. Chile finished the tournament second due to net run rate.

Chile has participated in every edition of the South American Championship since it was first held in 1995, and hosted it twice. It won the tournament in 2016 and 2011, and has been runner-up on six other occasions.

In April 2018, the ICC decided to grant full Twenty20 International (T20I) status to all its members. Therefore, all Twenty20 matches played between Chile and other ICC members after 1 January 2019 have the full T20I status.

Chile played their first T20I match against Brazil on 3 October 2019 during the 2019 South American Cricket Championship in Peru.

3 October 2019
11:45
Scorecard

Brazil; 96/5 (12 overs)	v	Chile; 61/8 (12 overs)
Muhammad Saleem 52 (40); Major Mandy 1/5 (1 over)		Hirenkumar Patel 20 (19); Kevin Silva 2/1 (1 over)

Brazil won by 35 runs
El Cortijo Polo Club Pitch 1, Lima
Umpires: Sandeep Harnal (Can) and Rakesh Jain (Per)

- Chile won the toss and elected to field.
- The match was reduced to 12 overs per side.
- First ever T20I match for Chile.

== Tournament history ==
=== ICC Americas Championship ===
- 2006: 3rd place (Division Three)
- 2008: 2nd place
- 2009: 3rd place

=== South American Championship ===
- 1995: 2nd place
- 1997: 4th place
- 1999: 3rd place
- 2000: 2nd place
- 2002: 2nd place
- 2004: 4th place
- 2007: 3rd place
- 2009: 2nd place
- 2011: 1st place
- 2013: 2nd place
- 2014: 2nd place
- 2015: 3rd place
- 2016: 1st place
- 2017: 2nd place
- 2018: 8th place
- 2019: 7th place
- 2022: 3rd place
- 2023: 8th place
- 2024: 6th place

== Records ==
International Match Summary — Chile

Last updated 20 October 2023

Playing Record
Format	M	W	L	T	NR	Inaugural Match
Twenty20 Internationals	6	1	5	0	0	3 October 2019

=== Twenty20 International ===
- Highest team total: 104/6 (17.3 overs) v. Mexico on 4 October 2019 at El Cortijo Polo Club, Lima.
- Highest individual score: 32, Major Mandy v. Peru on 5 October 2019 at El Cortijo Polo Club, Lima.
- Best individual bowling figures: 4/21, Hirenkumar Patel v. Mexico on 4 October 2019 at El Cortijo Polo Club, Lima.

Most T20I runs for Chile

Player	Runs	Average	Career span
Hirenkumar Patel	74	18.50	2019–2019
Major Mandy	54	13.50	2019–2019
Kamlesh Gupta	46	15.33	2019–2019
Aresh Srivastav	25	6.25	2019–2019
Hardev Singh	23	7.66	2019–2019

Most T20I wickets for Chile

Player	Wickets	Average	Career span
Hirenkumar Patel	7	11.71	2019–2019
Amit Uniyal	4	14.75	2019–2019
Major Mandy	3	14.33	2019–2019
Aresh Srivastav	3	24.33	2019–2019

T20I record versus other nations

Records complete to T20I #2323. Last updated 20 October 2023.

Opponent	M	W	L	T	NR	First match	First win
vs Associate Members
Argentina	2	0	2	0	0	5 October 2019	
Brazil	1	0	1	0	0	3 October 2019	
Mexico	2	1	1	0	0	4 October 2019	4 October 2019
Peru	1	0	1	0	0	5 October 2019	

=== Other matches ===
For a list of selected international matches played by Chile, see Cricket Archive.

== Players ==
=== Current squad ===
The following 17 players were called up to the squad for the 2023 Men's South American Cricket Championship matches.

- Alexander Carthew (captain)
- Alfredo Valdés Puentes
- Amit Uniyal
- Anthony Glynn Roe
- Benjamín Figueroa Constanzo
- Edward Gareth Taylor
- Eduardo Carrasco Leal
- Guillermo Aburto Contreras
- Ignacio Lisboa Miranda
- John William Bartlett (wicket-keeper)
- Jack Inglis
- James Miley
- Joseph Head
- Mario Pavez Ovalle (wicket-keeper)
- Michael Roe Espinoza
- Nelson Navarrete Aburto
- Simon Peter Shalders

== See also ==
- List of Chile Twenty20 International cricketers
