= Cricket in Colombia =

The first known cricket match in Colombia was played in 1897. There was a resurgence of the sport in the 1950s to 1970s, before a decline during the times of Colombia's internal troubles (see History below). Nowadays, there is a thriving cricket scene in Colombia. Eight men's clubs from Bogota (3), Medellin, Cali, Santa Marta, Cartagena and Barranquilla regularly play one another in regular national tournaments. Women's cricket in Colombia dates back to the 1960s; there is now a women's club in Barranquilla. Colombia has participated in all editions of the South American Cricket Championship since 2015, was the host nation for the competition in 2018, achieving its best finish of third in 2023. The sport has grown beyond the expat community - for instance, the squad for Colombia's first international series in 2010 included Camilo Fonseca and Jairo Venegas represented the country from 2014 to 2023. Nine Colombian nationals were named in the 2025 squad against Mexico. Colombian players have twice been named as South American Most Valuable Player in the South American Cricket Championship, Dian Perera in 2018 and Laurel Parks in 2023.

== History ==
In addition to the match reported in 1897, there are reports of cricket matches played at La Magdalena Jockey Club in 1905, 1907 and 1909.

On 20 May 1955, the Bogotá Cricket Club was created. The first chairman of the club was Englishman Reginald Brand alongside Indian, Rishiraj Patel. That club survives today as Bogota Sports Club, and cricket recently returned to the ground in 2025.

Bogota played Cali in December 1957, including representatives of the Shell company of Colombia. These matches were the first of a series of tests played between Bogotá against Cali or "Rest of Colombia" sides. The matches competed for the "H.E.'s Bat" (His Excellency's bat), a prize donated by British Ambassador and Honorary President of the Club Sir James Joint. The top scorer of the Cali Shell team was Zian Shah. This tradition continued into the 2000s, as the Ambassador's Cup was again contested in 2010–2014. More recently, Colombia's teams contest regular tournaments between teams of many cities.

The first recorded match in Colombia involving players of different countries was played by Bogota against Maracaibo (Shell) in February 1958. The return game was played in June of the same year. These series continued successfully until 1961.

In 1961 the Bogota Cricket Club was merged into the Bogotá Sports Club.

In March 1970, the New Zealand Ambassador's Cricket team visited the B.S.C. and was nearly beaten. That team included future internationals J.F.M. Morrison and A. Roberts.

Other matches were played against Cali, Medellín, Caracas (team included ex-West Indies Test cricketer Tony White), Curaçao, Lima, the Banks, BEA Silver Wing Club, the California Cricket Club (on their South American Tour), the Quidnuncs (including Dudley Owen-Thomas, David Hays and Derek George), and finally in February 1979 Derrick Robins' XI.

The Bogota Sports Club (with Tony White) was the only side to bowl them out (for 184) during their South American tour. Norman Bracht took 5–74 in 20 overs and White 3–70 in 22. Krish Vaidya, was the only player to remain not out with a century. Their side was managed by leading international cricketers of the time including Peter Parfitt (with Henry Blofeld), captained by Chris Cowdrey and included Bill Athey, Graham Stevenson, Tim Lloyd, Spandan Pandya and other good young county cricketers.

Though Cali and Bogotá played each other in 1981, in the eighties and nineties, there were limited cricket appearances in Colombia and internationally due to the decline in the number of expat workers — and thus cricketers — in Colombia.

However, the new millennium brought with it a mini-resurgence in Colombian cricket. The enthusiasm of Colombo-Canadian Norman Bracht, among others, allowed a game to be played in December 2000 between teachers of the Anglo Colombian school in Bogotá and a Bogotá Sports Club team comprising teachers from other schools, companies and the British Embassy. Twenty-six players turned out at the first match, which took place at the Bogotá Sports Club's new venue on the via Cota-Suba in the north of Bogotá.

Matches between teachers and other expats in Bogotá continued in 2001. In May that year, a touring team from Panamá spent a week in the Colombian capital. Panamá, led by Ismael Patel, won the two match series against Bogota Sports Club 2–0. In many ways, this Bogota team was a Colombia team featuring players from other cities, but it was not framed as an international match.

2002 brought further strides for the sport in Colombia as Bogotá took a team to Cali for the first Ambassador's Cup in 21 years. Matches on the tour, which counted on the support of the British Ambassador at the time, Mr Tom Duggan, were held at the Colegio Colombo-Británico in Cali. Around 200 people watched the first game, on Saturday 22 March, which Bogotá won by 25 runs having scored 98 in their allotted 22 overs. In the second match, on Sunday 3 March, Bogotá scored 176, enough to give them victory by 94 runs as Cali managed just 82.

A Colombia international men's cricket team played for the first time in a two-match series against Costa Rica in 2010 at Bogota Sports Club. Colombia fielded a squad of twenty players across the two matches, one team captained by Peter Dale and the other by Patrick Raikes. The series was drawn 1-1, with Andy Farrington, who would go on to captain the national team for around a decade, starring in both matches and Colombian national Camilo Fonseca taking a wicket. Others who would become key people in the development of Cricket in Colombia, such as Andrew Wright also featured.

In 2014 at the same time as an Ambassador's Cup event, and with the rebirth of the game of cricket nationally, the Colombia Cricket Board was first formed as an unincorporated association to administer the sport nationally and the national team. A meeting took place at Cafe el Ingles, Cra 11, Bogota, with representatives of Bogota Sports CC (led by Andrew Wright and including national player Jairo Venegas), Cedritos CC (Cameron Forbes, Andrew Farrington and Travis Crockett) and Cali CC (David Muirhead and others).

Soon after, in October 2014, Colombia hosted its first international cricket tournament, the Amazon Cup, between Peru, Brazil and Colombia. Peru was eliminated in the group stages and Colombia lost the final to Brazil (details of matches below). The following year, 2015, Colombia sent its first men's team to the South American Cricket Championships, which is the leading regional cricket competition.

Colombia hosted both the men and the women's edition of the South American Cricket Championship in 2018 at Los Pinos, Bogota. They took part in the men's tournament only, finishing at fourth place. The women's edition had WT20I status for the first time as per ICC's announcement. Colombia has also hosted T20 international series against Costa Rica (in Bogota in 2010), Mexico (in Barranquilla in 2025) and a Trinidad & Tobago team (in Cali in 2025). Colombia has been proposed has host nation again for the 2026 South American Cricket Championships.

Colombia has participated in every edition of the South American Cricket Championships since 2015 (i.e. 2015, 2016, 2017, 2018, 2019, 2022, 2023, 2024, 2025), achieving its best finish of third place in 2023 and fourth place in 2015, 2018, 2019 and 2025. Colombia's status as a non-ICC cricket playing country is increasingly anomalous, since the country has a long history of strong performance, having beaten all the ICC members of the South American and Central American region (Argentina, Brazil, Panama, Brazil, Mexico, Peru and Chile, in some times on multiple occasions) and has an active national cricket scene. With a view to taking this forwards, moves to reinvigorate the Colombian Cricket Board commenced again in 2024, with the confirmation of Paul Reid (long-time national team player and current Colombia men's captain, Barranquilla Cricket Club), Lee Bailey (Bogota Cricket Club) and John Wood (father of rising junior and recent Colombian men's player Jean-Paul Wood) as president, secretary and treasurer, respectively. A new board and board structure was established in 2024 at a meeting during a national tournament in Barranquilla. Representatives of most of the cricket clubs in Colombia (Andrew Farrington - Bogota Bushrangers, Dian Perera - Cali, Travis Crockett and Abhas Srivastava - Medellin, Felix Sullivan - Santa Marta, Andrew Wright - Barranquilla, Karthik Radhakrishna - Bogota Gladiators, Paola Solano - women's cricket) and board advisor Thomas Donegan all joined the group. In December 2024, eight years after Cricket Colombia first sought this, the Colombian Ministry of Sports finally recognised the sport of cricket in Colombia in a resolution calling for the establishment of a federation. The first club formally established under the Colombian Sports law was in Medellin, pursuant to a multi-sports corporation registration in early 2025. Cricket Colombia S.A.S. was formed as a legal entity to administer the sport in September 2025, with the same board members and advisors as on the former Cricket Colombia board.

== Women's cricket ==
Women's cricket was first played in Colombia at Bogota Sports Club in 1975.

Barranquilla Cricket Club has an emerging women's team who play regular nets. There are several Colombian women playing cricket in leagues outside the country, especially in the UK.[ Youth programmes (see next section) include both boys and girls. Cricket Colombia board member Paola Solano leads the women's development programme.

== Youth cricket ==
Colombia's main youth cricket programme is operated by El Rio Foundation near Santa Marta, which is a charity working in a post-conflict zone. The foundation has introduced over 600 children to cricket and organises regular games for local children.

Again, junior matches in Colombia date back to the 1970s, when Bogota Sports Club has a junior section. In the 2010s, Cali had the most active junior programme under Tony Williams. Kevin Martinez graduated from that programme and represented Colombia at the 2016 South American Championships. Bilverto Pulgarin, who played in Barranquilla's junior programme represented Colombia in two 2023 tours of Peru as a bowler. Jean-Paul Wood, a UK-Colombian dual national, has been one of Colombia's best players in recent international matches, scoring winning runs against Brazil in the South American Cricket Championships aged 14 in 2023, then top-scoring in the 2024 South American Cricket Championships.

== International matches involving Colombia ==
Colombia is anomalous in having a long history of cricket and a regionally competitive international team for years, but lacks ICC associate membership. This may be related to a lack of national recognition of cricket as a sport until a Colombian sports ministry resolution of December 2024. Colombia international matches are poorly recorded in databases such as Wisden, ESPN and other Wikipedia pages.

=== South American Cricket Championships ===
Colombia has participated in all editions of the South American Cricket Championship since 2015, hosting the tournament in 2018 and coming third in 2023.

=== Head to head record - summary ===
Colombia's head to head record against other international teams (all time):

Country	Won	Tie/Draw/Abandoned	Lost	Win %
Argentina	2	0	5	0.29
Brazil	3	0	8	0.27
Chile	1	0	5	0.17
Costa Rica	2	0	1	0.67
Mexico	4	0	10	0.29
Panama	1	0	3	0.25
Peru	9	0	10	0.47
(Trinidad and Tobago) Trinidad & Tobago	3	1	3	0.43
Uruguay	1	1	5	0.14
TOTAL	26	2	50	0.34

Note: Trinidad & Tobago matches were against development or legends squads.

== Colombia international players and matches - statistics ==
=== Colombia Men's Cricket T20 leading batters ===
Cap no.	Player name	Caps	Innings	Total runs	Balls faced	4s	6s	Out	Average	Strike rate
32	Chris Laas	42	42	883	954	90	20	30	29.43	92.56
55	Dian Perera	43	41	562	535	55	24	39	14.41	105.05
57	Satnam Sandhu	25	22	427	349	27	24	19	22.47	122.35
36	Nicholas Barsby	26	26	386	434	36	9	19	20.32	88.94
37	Abhas Shrivastava	24	24	330	313	45	5	18	18.33	105.43
97	Laurel Parks	13	13	307	223	24	16	11	27.91	137.67
4	Andrew Farrington	28	24	305	255	31	8	19	16.05	119.61
66	Salim Patel Guzman	29	27	276	234	25	13	22	12.55	117.95
68	Paul Reid	40	30	274	314	23	7	25	10.96	87.26
90	Karthik Radhakrishnan	23	20	187	252	16	5	17	11	74.21
26	Oliver West	18	17	172	221	10	2	15	11.47	77.83
85	Anshul Sehrawat	18	15	166	176	17	5	14	11.86	94.32
67	Martin Knight	9	8	158	157	16	3	7	22.57	100.64
63	Chris Payne	9	9	152	145	22	3	9	16.89	104.83
95	Oliver Barnes	5	5	147	125	12	2	4	36.75	117.60
81	Jean Paul Wood	18	14	135	163	13	0	10	13.50	82.82
25	Rohit Mohan	20	13	132	113	11	5	9	14.67	116.81
86	Srinivasan Seshadri	18	16	119	199	3	4	14	8.50	59.80
23	Cameron Forbes	7	7	111	114	10	3	6	18.50	97.37
104	Siddharth Bharamgunde	15	13	111	125	10	6	11	10.09	88.8
70	Julian Buttigieg	6	6	108	79	8	5	5	21.60	136.71
33	Robert McHugh	5	5	100	112	5	6	5	20.00	89.29

=== Colombia Men's Cricket T20 leading bowlers / wicket takers ===
Cap no.	Player Name	Wickets	Runs	Overs	Average	Strike rate	Economy rate
55	Dian Perera	46	810	124.57	17.61	16.25	6.50
68	Paul Reid	43	739	118.5	17.19	16.53	6.24
32	Chris Laas	34	474	71.83	13.94	12.68	6.60
25	Rohit Mohan	23	408	71.67	17.74	18.70	5.69
37	Abhas Shrivastava	23	432	67.83	18.78	17.70	6.37
36	Nicholas Barsby	19	358	51.47	18.84	16.25	6.96
23	Cameron Forbes	17	245	36.00	14.41	12.71	6.81
88	Haran Vadivoo Manimaran	16	191	35.67	11.94	13.37	5.36
4	Andrew Farrington	15	355	40.17	23.67	18.54	8.54
44	Guy Leslie	13	156	27.00	12.00	12.46	5.78
86	Srinivasan Seshadri	13	185	27.00	14.23	12.46	6.85
97	Laurel Parks	11	255	43.33	23.18	23.64	5.88
85	Anshul Sehrawat	11	289	45.83	26.27	25.00	6.31
90	Karthik Radhakrishnan	10	73	11.00	7.3	6.6	6.63
57	Satnam Sandhu	10	115	19.00	11.5	11.40	6.05
109	Ashish Sharma	9	99	16.5	11.00	11.00	6.00
108	Lee Bailey	9	140	26.00	15.56	17.33	5.38
19	Sebastian Lonsdale	8	64	7.00	8.00	8.40	7.00
98	Thomas Donegan	7	107	11.00	15.29	9.42	9.72
29	Pankaj Malik	6	187	28.00	31.17	28.00	6.68
82	Jean Paul Wood	6	254	33.83	42.33	33.83	7.51
31	Travis Crockett	6	257	26.00	42.83	26.00	9.88
22	Michael Phillips	5	50	9.00	10.00	10.80	5.56
104	Siddharth Bharamgunde	5	82	11.50	16.40	13.80	7.13
58	Aniket Kader	5	91	19.00	18.20	22.80	4.79
80	Bilverto Pulgarin	5	91	12.00	18.20	14.40	7.58
70	Julian Buttigieg	5	131	19.17	26.20	23.00	6.83

Note - data for Sebastian Lonsdale and Andrew Farrington includes two matches for which wickets and runs data exist, without number of balls data. Strike rates are based upon the subset of other matches.

=== Colombia Men's Cricket T20 batting statistics - greatest batting performances ===
Cap no.	Player Name	Match no.	Date	Opposition	Event	Runs	Balls faced	4s	6s	Out 1 / not out 0
32	Chris Laas	6	09/10/2015	Peru	SAC 2015	91	61	12	3	1
97	Laurel Parks	58	21/10/2023	Mexico	SAC 2023	80	45	10	4	0
97	Laurel Parks	54	18/10/2023	Panama	SAC 2023	77	53	4	4	0
57	Satnam Sandhu	73	18/08/2025	Trinidad & Tobago	Hero Motos Trophy	73	43	6	6	1
36	Nicholas Barsby	36	20/10/2022	Peru	SAC 2022	72	37	6	6	1
32	Chris Laas	19	15/10/2017	Mexico	SAC 2017	72	40	8	1	1
57	Satnam Sandhu	72	17/08/2025	Trinidad & Tobago	Hero Motos Trophy	69	37	5	6	1
32	Chris Laas	20	15/10/2017	Chile	SAC 2017	67	46	10	2	1
63	Chris Payne	43	09/02/2023	Trinidad & Tobago	2DA ESCION CRICKET CARNIVAL PANAMA 2023	65	39	9	2	1
67	Martin Knight	36	20/10/2022	Peru	SAC 2022	64	48	7	1	0
95	Oliver Barnes	58	21/10/2023	Mexico	SAC 2023	64	44	5	1	1
23	Cameron Forbes	5	06/10/2014	Brazil	Amazon Cup	64	55	7	2	1
66	Salim Patel Guzman	38	22/10/2022	Brazil	SAC 2022	60	40	6	2	0
55	Dian Perera	45	30/04/2023	Peru	CCP International Cricket Tournament Liga Los Andes 2023	58	35	5	3	0
67	Martin Knight	35	20/10/2022	Mexico	SAC 2022	58	52	5	2	1
97	Laurel Parks	56	20/10/2023	Brazil	SAC 2023	57	47	5	2	1
55	Dian Perera	63	09/05/2025	Mexico	Gulf Series Cup	54	37	3	5	1
84	Sethu Madavan	46	30/04/2023	Peru	CCP International Cricket Tournament Liga Los Andes 2023	53	61	6	1	0
32	Chris Laas	63	09/05/2025	Mexico	Gulf Series Cup	53	62	5	2	1
33	Robert McHugh	6	09/10/2015	Peru	SAC 2015	51	41	3	3	1
32	Chris Laas	9	11/10/2015	Chile	SAC 2015	50	39	6	2	1
104	Siddharth Bharamgunde	65	10/05/2025	Mexico	Gulf Series Cup	50	56	6	2	1
70	Julian Buttigieg	39	22/10/2022	Argentina	SAC 2022	49	26	3	4	1
81	Jean Paul Wood	61	12/10/2024	Peru	SAC 2024	49	34	7	0	1
37	Abhas Shrivastava	78	02/11/2025	Peru	SAC 2025	49	42	5	1	1
55	Dian Perera	43	09/02/2023	Trinidad & Tobago	2nd Edicion Cricket Carnaval Panama	48	28	10	0	1
41	Aman Gill	11	29/10/2016	Mexico	SAC 2016	48	32	6	0	0
55	Dian Perera	74	30/10/2025	Uruguay	SAC 2025	47	29	4	3	1
66	Salim Patel Guzman	40	23/10/2022	Chile	SAC 2022	46	23	4	3	1
95	Oliver Barnes	55	19/10/2023	Uruguay	SAC 2023	44	46	4	0	0
32	Chris Laas	24	24/08/2018	Brazil	SAC 2018	44	44	0	0	1
68	Paul Reid	46	30/04/2023	Peru	CCP International Cricket Tournament Liga Los Andes 2023	43	31	6	1	1
86	Srinivasan Seshadri	53	21/08/2023	Peru	CCP International Cricket Tournament Liga Los Andes 2023 Series 2	43	35	0	4	1
85	Anshul Sehrawat	56	20/10/2023	Brazil	SAC 2023	42	33	6	1	1
25	Rohit Mohan	4	06/10/2014	Brazil	Amazon Cup	41	26	2	2	0
22	Michael Phillips	3	05/10/2014	Peru	Amazon Cup	41	39	6	0	1
57	Satnam Sandhu	27	25/08/2018	Chile	SAC 2018	41	41	5	1	1
90	Karthik Radhakrishnan	53	21/08/2023	Peru	CCP International Cricket Tournament Liga Los Andes 2023 Series 2	41	48	2	1	1
36	Nicholas Barsby	30	03/10/2019	Argentina	SAC 2019	40	38	5	1	0
37	Abhas Shrivastava	13	30/10/2016	Peru	SAC 2016	40	32	6	0	1
36	Nicholas Barsby	39	22/10/2022	Argentina	SAC 2022	40	49	4	0	1
102	Felix Sullivan	67	11/05/2025	Mexico	Gulf Series Cup	39	28	4	2	0
99	Waqar Khan	66	10/05/2025	Mexico	Gulf Series Cup	39	26	7	1	1
55	Dian Perera	47	01/05/2023	Peru	CCP International Cricket Tournament Liga Los Andes 2023	39	49	4	0	1

=== Colombia Men's Cricket T20 batting statistics - greatest bowling performances ===
Cap no.	Player Name	Match no.	Date	Opposition	Event	Wickets	Runs	Overs
109	Ashish Sharma	109	16/08/2025	Trinidad & Tobago	Hero Motos Trophy	5	4	3.5
88	Haran Vadivoo Manimaran	45	30/04/2023	Peru	CCP International Cricket Tournament Liga Los Andes 2023	5	8	3.67
90	Karthik Radhakrishnan	78	02/11/2025	Peru	SAC 2025	5	11	4
44	Guy Leslie	34	05/10/2019	Brazil	SAC 2019	5	12	4
55	Dian Perera	28	26/08/2018	Argentina	SAC 2018	5	12	4
57	Satnam Sandhu	25	25/08/2018	Costa Rica	SAC 2018	5	14	4
88	Haran Vadivoo Manimaran	44	29/04/2023	Peru	CCP International Cricket Tournament Liga Los Andes 2023	5	17	4
90	Karthik Radhakrishnan	68	15/08/2025	Trinidad & Tobago	Hero Motos Trophy	4	7	2
55	Dian Perera	23	24/08/2018	Peru	SAC 2018	4	9	3.33
44	Guy Leslie	31	04/10/2019	Mexico	SAC 2019	4	11	4
37	Abhas Shrivastava	11	29/10/2016	Mexico	SAC 2016	4	13	4
22	Michael Phillips	3	05/10/2014	Peru	Amazon Cup	4	15	4
32	Chris Laas	21	16/10/2017	Argentina	SAC 2017	4	17	3
32	Chris Laas	64	09/05/2025	Mexico	Gulf Series Cup	4	20	4
36	Nicholas Barsby	8	11/10/2015	Mexico	SAC 2015	4	22	3.83
32	Chris Laas	32	04/10/2019	Chile	SAC 2019	4	31	4
68	Paul Reid	68	15/08/2025	Trinidad & Tobago	Hero Motos Trophy	3	5	3.83
70	Julian Buttigieg	36	20/10/2022	Peru	SAC 2022	3	9	4
68	Paul Reid	71	17/08/2025	Trinidad & Tobago	Hero Motos Trophy	3	10	3.17
25	Rohit Mohan	23	24/08/2018	Peru	SAC 2018	3	10	4
80	Bilverto Pulgarin	45	30/04/2023	Peru	CCP International Cricket Tournament Liga Los Andes 2023	3	11	2
37	Abhas Shrivastava	6	09/10/2015	Peru	SAC 2015	3	11	3
55	Dian Perera	27	25/08/2018	Chile	SAC 2018	3	13	3.5
19	Sebastian Lonsdale	2	25/04/2010	Costa Rica	CR tour Col	3	15	No data
32	Chris Laas	26	25/08/2018	Mexico	SAC 2018	3	16	4
32	Chris Laas	10	12/10/2015	Brazil	SAC 2015	3	17	4
97	Laurel Parks	59	10/10/2024	Brazil	SAC 2024	3	18	4
85	Anshul Sehrawat	52	20/08/2023	Peru	CCP International Cricket Tournament Liga Los Andes 2023 Series 2	3	19	4
109	Ashish Sharma	71	17/08/2025	Trinidad & Tobago	Hero Motos Trophy	3	20	3
19	Sebastian Lonsdale	66	10/05/2025	Mexico	Gulf Series Cup	3	20	4
86	Srinivasan Seshadri	53	21/08/2023	Peru	CCP International Cricket Tournament Liga Los Andes 2023 Series 2	3	20	4
89	Vinoth Kumar Natarajan	50	19/08/2023	Peru	CCP International Cricket Tournament Liga Los Andes 2023 Series 2	3	20	4
55	Dian Perera	49	19/08/2023	Peru	CCP International Cricket Tournament Liga Los Andes 2023 Series 2	3	21	3
86	Srinivasan Seshadri	49	19/08/2023	Peru	CCP International Cricket Tournament Liga Los Andes 2023 Series 2	3	23	4
25	Rohit Mohan	24	24/08/2018	Brazil	SAC 2018	3	25	4
25	Rohit Mohan	27	25/08/2018	Chile	SAC 2018	3	30	4
29	Pankaj Malik	9	11/10/2015	Chile	SAC 2015	3	31	4
98	Thomas Donegan	63	09/05/2025	Mexico	Gulf Series Cup	3	36	3

=== Colombia Men's T20 cricket - full list of men's international team players, cap numbers and numbers of appearances ===
Data is as of 24 November 2025, subject to the notes on matches in the previous section.

Cap no.	Player name	Caps / Appearances
1	Peter Dale	1
2	Edward Dallas	1
3	Edward Davey	1
4	Andrew Farrington	28
5	Mark Farrington	1
6	Peter Goodhew	1
7	Ben Morris	1
8	Andrew Priestley	1
9	Kauchar Sheth	1
10	Matthew Wilkinson	1
11	Burney Zaheer	1
12	Patrick Raikes	6
13	Julian Abelson	1
14	James Atkinson	1
15	Ben Brown	1
16	Camilo Fonseca	1
17	Michael Geddes	1
18	Sebastian Hiperson	1
19	Sebastian Lonsdale	4
20	Daniel Thorpe	1
21	Andrew Wright	4
22	Michael Phillips	3
23	Cameron Forbes	7
24	Ryan Butta	3
25	Rohit Mohan	20
26	Oliver West	18
27	Kushal Jaiswal	3
28	Kamal Mirchandani	1
29	Pankaj Malik	8
30	Jairo Andres Venegas Vargas	3
31	Travis Crockett	17
32	Chris Laas	42
33	Robert McHugh	5
34	Tommy Dutton	5
35	David Stuart	4
36	Nicholas Barsby	26
37	Abhas Shrivastava	24
38	Jon Arnold	2
39	Alex Golton	5
40	Darren Thompson	7
41	Aman Gill	9
42	Stuart Treiber	4
43	Bittou Sihan	10
44	Guy Leslie	9
45	Vino Chandrasekar	8
46	DJ Procter	4
47	Kevin Martinez	3
48	M Antonucci	7
49	Mark Edelston	12
50	F G Grummit	6
51	J C Charlton	3
52	S Pandya	10
53	D Wiltshire	2
54	Patrick Smallwood	6
55	Dian Perera	43
56	M Shaban	4
57	Satnam Sandhu	25
58	Aniket Kader	8
59	James C Davis	6
60	Balaji Krishnan	8
61	D R Hall	4
62	Andrew West	2
63	Chris Payne	9
64	O G T F Farr	4
65	Viresh Kavikar	7
66	Salim Patel Guzman	29
67	Martin Knight	9
68	Paul Reid	40
69	Hohib Habibzai	5
70	Julian Buttigieg	6
71	Chris Price	6
72	Mukund Pandey	4
73	Joe Mansfield	9
74	Jaison Gutierrez	14
75	Krishnan Canagasabey	3
76	Ronal Quiroga	1
77	Jake Chang	7
78	Jose Banquero	1
79	Santiago Rodriguez	2
80	Bilverto Pulgarin	7
81	Jean Paul Wood	18
82	Jose Cantillo	1
83	Jerry Kalarickal	1
84	Sethu Madavan	5
85	Anshul Sehrawat	18
86	Srinivasan Seshadri	18
87	Winston Cheng	2
88	Haran Vadivoo Manimaran	12
89	Vinoth Kumar Natarajan	6
90	Karthik Radhakrishnan	23
91	Ivan Valenciano	2
92	Sankar Sekaran	4
93	Aanandan	2
94	Pravin Shamdasani	4
95	Oliver Barnes	5
96	Philip Konecny	4
97	Laurel Parks	13
98	Thomas Donegan	10
99	Waqar Khan	6
100	Colis Rimple	3
101	Niroshan Sirisena	2
102	Felix Sullivan	5
103	Edward Howat	1
104	Siddharth Bharamgunde	15
105	Oscar Snow	3
106	Paul Inch	11
107	Mark Lamont	2
108	Lee Bailey	11
109	Asish Sharma	8

=== Colombia Men's T20 most capped players ===
Cap no.	Player name	Caps / Appearances
55	Dian Perera	43
32	Chris Laas	42
68	Paul Reid	40
66	Salim Patel Guzman	29
4	Andrew Farrington	28
36	Nicholas Barsby	26
57	Satnam Sandhu	25
37	Abhas Shrivastava	24
90	Karthik Radhakrishnan	23
25	Rohit Mohan	20
26	Oliver West	18
81	Jean Paul Wood	18
85	Anshul Sehrawat	18
86	Srinivasan Seshadri	18
31	Travis Crockett	17
104	Siddharth Bharamgunde	15
74	Jaison Gutierrez	14
38	Jon Arnold	13
97	Laurel Parks	13
49	Mark Edelston	12
88	Haran Vadivoo Manimaran	12
106	Paul Inch	11
108	Lee Bailey	11
43	Bittou Sihan	10
52	S Pandya	10
98	Thomas Donegan	10

=== List of men's international cricket matches featuring Colombia ===
Match no.	Date	Opposition	Event	Home/Away	Location	Outcome	Scorecard	Notes
1	24/04/2010	Costa Rica	CR tour Col	Home	Bogota Sports Club	Lost	Scorecard	Note these two are only partial scorecards, with team list, best performances and totals. Scorecard needed.
2	25/04/2010	Costa Rica	CR tour Col	Home	Bogota Sports Club	Won	Scorecard	
3	05/10/2014	Peru	Amazon Cup	Home	Los Pinos	Won	Scorecard	
4	06/10/2014	Brazil	Amazon Cup	Home	Los Pinos	Won	Scorecard	Note - Three missing caps in scoresheet were of Jaime Venegas, Pankaj Malik and Andrew Farrington.
5	06/10/2014	Brazil	Amazon Cup	Home	Los Pinos	Lost	Scorecard	
6	09/10/2015	Peru	SAC 2015	Away	Chile	Won	Scorecard	
7	10/10/2015	Argentina	SAC 2015	Away	Chile	Lost	Scorecard	
8	11/10/2015	Mexico	SAC 2015	Away	Chile	Lost	Scorecard	
9	11/10/2015	Chile	SAC 2015	Away	Chile	Lost	Scorecard	
10	12/10/2015	Brazil	SAC 2015	Away	Chile	Lost	Scorecard	
11	29/10/2016	Mexico	SAC 2016	Away	Brazil	Won	Scorecard	
12	29/10/2016	Brazil	SAC 2016	Away	Brazil	Lost	Scorecard	
13	30/10/2016	Peru	SAC 2016	Away	Brazil	Lost	Scorecard	
14	30/10/2016	Chile	SAC 2016	Away	Brazil	Lost	Scorecard	
15	30/10/2016	Argentina	SAC 2016	Away	Brazil	Lost	Scorecard	
16	13/10/2017	Peru	SAC 2017	Away	Argentina	Lost	Scorecard	
17	14/10/2017	Uruguay	SAC 2017	Away	Argentina	Lost	Scorecard	
18	14/10/2017	Brazil	SAC 2017	Away	Argentina	Lost	Scorecard	
19	15/10/2017	Mexico	SAC 2017	Away	Argentina	Lost	Scorecard	
20	15/10/2017	Chile	SAC 2017	Away	Argentina	Lost	Scorecard	
21	16/10/2017	Argentina	SAC 2017	Away	Argentina	Lost	Scorecard	Note two missing players in scorecard
22	24/08/2018	Uruguay	SAC 2018	Home	Los Pinos	Lost	Scorecard	
23	24/08/2018	Peru	SAC 2018	Home	Los Pinos	Won	Scorecard	
24	24/08/2018	Brazil	SAC 2018	Home	Los Pinos	Lost	Scorecard	
25	25/08/2018	Costa Rica	SAC 2018	Home	Los Pinos	Won	Scorecard	
26	25/08/2018	Mexico	SAC 2018	Home	Los Pinos	Lost	Scorecard	
27	25/08/2018	Chile	SAC 2018	Home	Los Pinos	Won	Scorecard	
28	26/08/2018	Argentina	SAC 2018	Home	Los Pinos	Won	Scorecard	
29	03/10/2019	Peru	SAC 2019	Away	Peru	Lost	Scorecard	Note - missing two caps
30	03/10/2019	Argentina	SAC 2019	Away	Peru	Won	Scorecard	Note - missing four caps in scoresheet (one is confirmed by email to be Andy Farrington; added so three left). Batter out for 0 is Andrew West.
31	04/10/2019	Mexico	SAC 2019	Away	Peru	Lost	Scorecard	
32	04/10/2019	Chile	SAC 2019	Away	Peru	Lost	Scorecard	Note - one missing cap
33	05/10/2019	Uruguay	SAC 2019	Away	Peru	Lost	Scorecard	
34	05/10/2019	Brazil	SAC 2019	Away	Peru	Won	Scorecard	Two missing caps
35	20/10/2022	Mexico	SAC 2022	Away	Brazil	Lost	Scorecard	Note - 14 players named. Salim Patel and A Farrington are duplicated in scoresheet. One cap needs removing (either Chris Price or Paddy Raikes)
36	20/10/2022	Peru	SAC 2022	Away	Brazil	Won	Scorecard	
37	21/10/2022	Uruguay	SAC 2022	Away	Brazil	Lost	Scorecard	Note - Chris Payne and Chris Price are back to front in batting scoresheet. This has been reversed in table of batting data.
38	22/10/2022	Brazil	SAC 2022	Away	Brazil	Lost	Scorecard	
39	22/10/2022	Argentina	SAC 2022	Away	Brazil	Lost	Scorecard	
40	23/10/2022	Chile	SAC 2022	Away	Brazil	Lost	Scorecard	
41	07/02/2023	Panama	2DA ESCION CRICKET CARNIVAL PANAMA 2023	Away	Panama	Lost	Scorecard	Note - cric-heroes has as Panama A and B. However these were two full strength Panama sides of equal strength from the Panama squad. Note - Associate Cricket world reports as 'two Panama teams; - Report Note Naeem = Chris Laas. Chirag = Jake Chang and other typos, nicknames and partial names or mis-spelt names can be worked out intuitively - see Appearances and Batting data.
42	08/02/2023	Panama	2DA ESCION CRICKET CARNIVAL PANAMA 2023	Away	Panama	Lost	Scorecard	
43	09/02/2023	Trinidad & Tobago	2DA ESCION CRICKET CARNIVAL PANAMA 2023	Away	Panama	Lost	Scorecard	Note - cric-heroes has opposition as 'Trinidad & Tobago'. Associate Cricket world say it was a representative team .
44	29/04/2023	Peru	CCP International Cricket Tournament Liga Los Andes 2023	Away	Peru	Lost	Scorecard	Twelve players named - Bilverto Pulgarin neither bowled nor batted so was 12th man, cap not counted.
45	30/04/2023	Peru	CCP International Cricket Tournament Liga Los Andes 2023	Away	Peru	Won	Scorecard	Note - this series at time considered international match. Cricket Peru may have had internal issues at time which may be why team stated as 'Peru Warriors' in some match reports in this series (but not all) in cric-heroes. Same applies to August tournaments. Note - review of WhatsApp messages shows invitations from Cricket Peru See e.g. Series announcement Note in this match, twelve players named - Winston Cheng was 12th man.
46	30/04/2023	Peru	CCP International Cricket Tournament Liga Los Andes 2023	Away	Peru	Won	Scorecard	Twelve players named - Bilverto Pulgarin was 12th man.
47	01/05/2023	Peru	CCP International Cricket Tournament Liga Los Andes 2023	Away	Peru	Lost	Scorecard	Twelve players named - Bilverto Pulgarin was 12th man.
48	01/05/2023	Peru	CCP International Cricket Tournament Liga Los Andes 2023	Away	Peru	Won	Scorecard	Twelve players named in scoresheet - Jairo Venegas was 12th man.
49	19/08/2023	Peru	CCP International Cricket Tournament Liga Los Andes 2023 Series 2	Away	Peru	Lost	Scorecard	Twelve players named - Bilverto Pulgarin only not to bat and was 12th man.
50	19/08/2023	Peru	CCP International Cricket Tournament Liga Los Andes 2023 Series 2	Away	Peru	Lost	Scorecard	
51	20/08/2023	Peru	CCP International Cricket Tournament Liga Los Andes 2023 Series 2	Away	Peru	Lost	Scorecard	Twelve players named - Vinoth only not to bat so was 12th man.
52	20/08/2023	Peru	CCP International Cricket Tournament Liga Los Andes 2023 Series 2	Away	Peru	Lost	Scorecard	Twelve players named - Aanandan only not to bat so was 12th man.
53	21/08/2023	Peru	CCP International Cricket Tournament Liga Los Andes 2023 Series 2	Away	Peru	Won	Scorecard	Twelve players named - Sankar Sekaran was 12th man.
54	18/10/2023	Panama	SAC 2023	Away	Argentina	Won	Scorecard Original scorecard	
55	19/10/2023	Uruguay	SAC 2023	Away	Argentina	Lost	Scorecard Original scorecard	Note - scoresheet on ESPN contains error, Should read Pravin Shandasani lbw R Ahir 0 off 5 balls. Oliver Barnes 32 off 30 balls 3 fours, caught Bawa bowled Kapadiya. Cricheroes is partially corrected to the correct scores but left more than 2 players as 'not out' and did not fix balls faced (did not process correction fully), ESPN is wrong as it was copied from cric-heroes prior to post-match corrections.
56	20/10/2023	Brazil	SAC 2023	Away	Argentina	Won	Scorecard Original scorecard	Note - Cric heroes and ESPN are inconsistent in awarding a cap to Pravin Shamdasani vs Thomas Donegan. Cric heroes is correct - Thomas was in the XI per original team sheet.
57	21/10/2023	Argentina	SAC 2023	Away	Argentina	Lost	Scorecard Original scorecard	
58	21/10/2023	Mexico	SAC 2023	Away	Argentina	Won	Scorecard Original scorecard	
59	10/10/2024	Brazil	SAC 2024	Away	Brazil	Lost	Scorecard Original scorecard	
60	11/10/2024	Mexico	SAC 2024	Away	Brazil	Lost	Scorecard Original scorecard	
61	12/10/2024	Peru	SAC 2024	Away	Brazil	Lost	Scorecard Original scorecard	
62	13/10/2024	Uruguay	SAC 2024	Away	Brazil	Won	Scorecard	Walkover - so no caps awarded.
63	09/05/2025	Mexico	Gulf Series Cup	Home	Solinilla	Won	Scorecard	
64	09/05/2025	Mexico	Gulf Series Cup	Home	Solinilla	Lost	Scorecard	
65	10/05/2025	Mexico	Gulf Series Cup	Home	Solinilla	Lost	Scorecard	
66	10/05/2025	Mexico	Gulf Series Cup	Home	Solinilla	Lost	Scorecard	
67	11/05/2025	Mexico	Gulf Series Cup	Home	Solinilla	Won	Scorecard	Note - both teams had an additional batter and bowler. Colombia had Paul Inch batting and Seb Lonsdale bowling as alternates. Thomas Donegan for Chris Laas concussion substitute. Unusually 13 caps as stated on scorecard is correct.
68	15/08/2025	Trinidad & Tobago	Hero Motos Trophy	Home	Cali	Match abandoned	Scorecard	Note on series, some sources label this as T&T national team others as a legend team:
69	16/08/2025	Trinidad & Tobago	Hero Motos Trophy	Home	Cali	Won	Scorecard	Note after this match all games in this series had 12 players with a bat/bowl sub, so 12 caps each game.
70	16/08/2025	Trinidad & Tobago	Hero Motos Trophy	Home	Cali	Lost	Scorecard	
71	17/08/2025	Trinidad & Tobago	Hero Motos Trophy	Home	Cali	Lost	Scorecard	
72	17/08/2025	Trinidad & Tobago	Hero Motos Trophy	Home	Cali	Won	Scorecard	Note there is another scorecard available which is a fragment of the actual scorecard and not a separate match. Note Sebastian Lonsdale is listed as playing but did not attend the tournament.
73	18/08/2025	Trinidad & Tobago	Hero Motos Trophy	Home	Cali	Won	Scorecard	
74	30/10/2025	Uruguay	SAC 2025	Away	Brazil	Match abandoned	Scorecard	12 players listed. Jaison Gutierrez was named as 12th man so not capped.
75	31/10/2025	Brazil	SAC 2025	Away	Brazil	Lost	Scorecard	
76	01/11/2025	Mexico	SAC 2025	Away	Brazil	Lost	Scorecard	
77	02/11/2025	Panama	SAC 2025	Away	Brazil	Lost	Scorecard	
78	02/11/2025	Peru	SAC 2025	Away	Brazil	Won	Scorecard	

Notes. 1960s/1970s and subsequent matches before 2010 were played in name of Bogota CC or Cali CC, not Colombia. E.g. Panama 2001 match was billed as Panama v Bogota ('an international match of sorts'), but not an official match of Colombia. See report here: Series report . And here says 'Bogota responded...' in second innings (not Colombia) in this Match report. Note - Chile tour of Colombia cerca 2009-2011 - no report, record or scoresheet can be found so data not included.

== International matches involving Colombia (excluding South American Cricket Championships) ==
Details of matches during South American Cricket Championships can be found elsewhere. Details of other (non-SACC) international series and cricket matches involving Colombia are set out here.

=== Mexico tour of Colombia 2025 - Gulf Series Cup ===
Mexico won the series and inaugural Gulf Series Cup 3–2. In the last match, the last wicket chase of 56 by Felix Sullivan and Oscar Snow for Colombia is apparently the highest ever in T20 internationals (possibly the highest in T20s), beating the previous record of 46.

==== Squads ====
Colombia Paul Reid (captain), Dian Perera (vc), Lee Bailey, Siddharth Bharamgunde, Jorge Bolivar, Jose Cantillo, Thomas Donegan, David Guevara, Jason Gutierrez, Jhon Hernandez, Paul Inch, Waqar Khan, Balaji Krishnan, Chris Laas, Jefferson Lambiz, Mark Lamont, Sebastian Lonsdale, Salim Patel Guzman, Samir Polo, Oscar Snow, Abhas Srivastava, Felix Sullivan, Ivan Valenciano.

Mexico Subash Chandra Bose Rooban, Suraj Chandra Mohan, Somnath Deshmukh, Devon Ebersohn, Shankar Ganesan, Rohit Gupta, Yashvanth Jasti, Harish Kumar, Vinodh Kumar Ambalahandi Bhakthavachalam, Avinash Nagaram, Pandiarajan Rajagopal, Praveen Santhanakrishnan, Shubhang Sharma, Govardhan Vasanth Singh, Arun Veerabathiran, Bravin Vijaya Raja Jansi Rani.

==== Match 1 ====
9 May 2025
9:00
Scorecard

Colombia; 154/3 (20 overs)	v	Mexico; 133 all out (16.5 overs)
Dian Perera 54 (37); Harish Kumar 1/20 (4 overs)		Bose Ruban 64 (42); Thomas Donegan 3/36 (3 overs)

Colombia won by 21 runs
Combarranquilla, Atlantico, Colombia,
Umpires: Andrew Wright (Eng) and Govardhan (Mex)
Player of the match: Christopher Laas (Col)

- Colombia won the toss and elected to bat.

==== Match 2 ====
9 May 2025
14:00

Colombia; 90/8 (20 overs)	v	Mexico; 148/9 (20 overs)
Dian Perera 22 (21); Yashvanth Jasti 3/7 (3 overs)		Shubhang Sharma 27 (30); Chris Laas 4/20 (4 overs)

Mexico won by 58 runs
Combarranquilla, Atlantico, Colombia,
Umpires: Andrew Wright (Eng) and Govardhan (Mex)
Player of the match: Yashvanth Jasti (Mex)

- Mexico won the toss and elected to bat.

==== Match 3 ====
10 May 2025
09:00

Colombia; 111/6 (20 overs)	v	Mexico; 112/4 (15.4 overs)
Siddharth Bharamgunde 50 (56); Arun Veerabathira 3/19 (4 overs)		Bose Ruban 33 (16); Dian Perera 1/15 (4 overs)

Mexico won by 6 wickets
Combarranquilla, Atlantico, Colombia,
Umpires: Andrew Wright (Eng) and Govardhan (Mex)
Player of the match: Shubhang Sharma (Mex)

- Mexico won the toss and elected to field.

==== Match 4 ====
10 May 2025
14:00

Colombia; 116 all out (19.1 overs)	v	Mexico; 117/8 (17 overs)
Waqar Khan 39 (26); Shankar Ganesan 5/15 (4 overs)		Devon Ebersohn 31 (40); Sebastian Lonsdale 3/20 (4 overs)

Mexico won by 2 wickets
Combarranquilla, Atlantico, Colombia,
Umpires: Andrew Wright (Eng) and Govardhan (Mex)
Player of the match: Shankar Ganesan (Mex)

- Colombia won the toss and elected to bat.

==== Match 5 ====
11 May 2025
08:00

Colombia; 121/9 (19.4 overs)	v	Mexico; 120/9 (20 overs)
Felix Sullivan 39* (28); Bose Ruban 3/17 (4 overs)		Suraj Kannadiga 25 (26); Sebastian Lonsdale 2/19 (2 overs)

Colombia won by 1 wicket
Combarranquilla, Atlantico, Colombia,
Umpires: Andrew Wright (Eng) and Harish Kumar (Mex)
Player of the match: Felix Sullivan (Col)

- Colombia won the toss and elected to field.

=== Colombia tour of Peru August 2023 ===
5-match series tour by Colombia of Brazil entitled 'CCP International Cricket Tournament Liga Los Andes Season 2'. Peru won 4–1, reversing Colombia's 3–2 victory in the series earlier in the year (see below)

==== Squads ====
Colombia Paul Reid (captain), Aanandan, Jake Chang, Jaison Gutierrez, Viresh Kavikar, Vinoth Kumar Natarajan, Vinoth Kumar Natarajan, Joe Mansfield, Dian Perera, Bilverto Pulgarin, Karthik Radhakrishnan, Anshul Sehrawat, Sankar Sekaran, Srinivasan Seshadri, Ivan Valenciano.

Peru Aman Arora, Bishwajeet, Harshil Brahmbhatt, Erick Cajahuaman, Joel Crup, Milka Braulio Elias Gonzales, Gabriel Lozano, Mohsin Husain, Yahya Khan, Manoj Kumar Rana, Priyadarshi Padhi, Nikhilesh R, Pravin Shamdasani, Jagjit Singh, Sumit Sharma.

==== Match 1 ====
19 August 2023
08:00

Peru; 135/8 (20 overs)	v	Colombia; 97 all out (20 overs)
Harshil Brahmbhatt 40 (41); Dian Perera 3/21 (3 overs)		Dian Perera 32 (20); Sumit Sharma 3/7 (2 overs)

Peru won by 38 runs
Lurin Rugby Ground, Lima.
Player of the match: Sumit Sharma (Per)

- Colombia won the toss and elected to field.

==== Match 2 ====
19 August 2023
14:00

Peru; 105 all out (14.3 overs)	v	Colombia; 86/9 (20 overs)
Nikhilesh R 12* (7); Vinoth Kumar Natarajan 3/20 (4 overs)		Sankar Sekaran 20* (11); Sumit Sharma 2/13 (4 overs)

Peru won by 19 runs
Lurin Rugby Ground, Lima.
Player of the match: Sumit Sharma (Per)

- Peru won the toss and elected to bat.

==== Match 3 ====
20 August 2023
08:00

Peru; 134/7 (20 overs)	v	Colombia; 74 all out (15.3 overs)
Mohsin Husain 38 (40); Paul Reid 2/27 (4 overs)		Karthik Radhakrishnan 17 (24); Jagjit Singh 2/7 (2 overs)

Peru won by 60 runs
Lurin Rugby Ground, Lima.
Player of the match: Jagjit Singh (Per)

- Colombia won the toss and elected to field.

==== Match 4 ====
20 August 2023
14:00

Colombia; 82 all out (16.4 overs)	v	Peru; 83/7 (16 overs)
Dian Perera 15 (14); Aman Arora 4/10 (3 overs)		Yahya Khan 19* (20); Anshul Sehrawat 3/19 (4 overs)

Peru won by 3 wickets
Lurin Rugby Ground, Lima.
Player of the match: Aman Arora (Per)

- Colombia won the toss and elected to bat.

==== Match 5 ====
21 August 2023
09:00

Colombia; 127/7 (20 overs) & 6/0 (0.2 of S.O.)	v	Peru; 127/7 (20 overs) & 5/2 (S.O.)
Srinivasan Seshadri 43 (35); Nikhilesh R. 3/20 (4 overs)		Harshil Brahmbhatt 33 (24); Srinivasan Seshadri 3/20 (4 overs) Paul Reid 2/5 (S.O.)

Scores tied. Colombia won super-over by one run
Lurin Rugby Ground, Lima.
Player of the match: Srinivasan Seshadri (Col)

- Colombia won the toss and elected to bat.

=== Colombia tour of Peru April–May 2023 ===
5-match series tour by Colombia of Peru entitled 'CCP International Cricket Tournament Liga Los Andes'. Colombia won 3–2. Note some (but not all) scorecards of this series and the later Peru series in 2023 (see above) refer 'Peru Warriors' as the opposition. Cricket Colombia was invited by Peru Cricket Association representatives and the Peru team was made up of qualifying players many of whom have played in South American championships. Cricket Colombia classifies these matches (and those in the other Peru tour of 2023) as international matches.

==== Squads ====
Colombia Sethu Madhavan K (captain), Winston Cheng, Vinoth Kumar Natarajan, Salim Guzman Patel, Dian Perera, Bilverto Pulgarin, Paul Reid, Satnam Sandhu, Anshul Sehrawat, Srinivasan Seshadri, Haran Vadivoo Manimaran, Jairo Andres Venegas Vargas, Jean-Paul Wood.

Peru Jose Maria Bernaola, Erick Cajahuaman, Milka Braulio Elias Gonzales, Mohsin Husain, Jair, Joel Crup, Sofia Esteban Linares, Gabriel Lozano, Manoj Kumar Rana, Madhavan K, Ayush Rana, Nikhilesh R., Priyadarshi Padhi, Rohit Frd, Jagjit Singh, Pravin Shamdasani, Aditya Sharma, Sumit Sharma, Aditya Sharma.

==== Match 1 ====
29 April 2023
13:30

Peru; 129/8 (20 overs)	v	Colombia; 120/9 (20 overs)
Priyadarshi Padhi 51 (58); Haran Vadivoo Manimaran 5/17 (4 overs)		Satnam Sandhu 35 (26); Manoj Kumar Rana 3/23 (4 overs)

Peru won by 13 runs
Lurin Rugby Ground, Lima.
Player of the match: Manoj Kumar Rana (Per)

- Colombia won the toss and elected to field.

==== Match 2 ====
30 April 2023
08:00

Peru; 92/10 (17.4 overs)	v	Colombia; 93/1 (12.3 overs)
Priyadarshi Padhi 22 (26); Haran Vadivoo Manimaran 5/8 (3.4 overs)		Dian Perera 58* (35); Sumit Sharma 1/8 (1 overs)

Colombia won by 9 wickets
Lurin Rugby Ground, Lima.
Player of the match: Haran Vadivoo Manimaran (Col)

- Colombia won the toss and elected to field.

==== Match 3 ====
30 April 2023
14:00

Colombia; 152/6 (20 overs)	v	Peru; 130/8 (20 overs)
Sethu Madhavan 53 (61); Pravin Shamdasani 3/20 (4 overs)		Harshil Brahmbhatt 75 (55); Paul Reid 2/32 (4 overs)

Colombia won by 22 runs
Lurin Rugby Ground, Lima.
Player of the match: Paul Reid (Col)

- Peru won the toss and elected to field.

==== Match 4 ====
1 May 2023
08:00

Peru; 107/9 (20 overs)	v	Colombia; 83/9 (20 overs)
Pravin Shamdasani 46 (45); Srinivasan Seshadri 1/12 (2 overs)		Dian Perera 39 (49); Pravin Shamdasani 3/13 (4 overs)

Peru won by 24 runs
Lurin Rugby Ground, Lima.
Player of the match: Pravin Shamdasani (Per)

- Colombia won the toss and elected to field.

==== Match 5 ====
1 May 2023
08:00

Peru; 92/8 (20 overs)	v	Colombia; 96/5 (18.4 overs)
Pravin Shamdasani 22 (26); Paul Reid 2/13 (4 overs)		Anshul Sehrawat 34 (30); Pravin Shamdasani 2/17 (4 overs)

Colombia won by 5 wickets
Lurin Rugby Ground, Lima.
Player of the match: Anshul Sehrawat (Col)

- Colombia won the toss and elected to field.

=== Colombia participation in Panama tournament, February 2023 ===
This tournament was entitled the 'Segunda Escion, Cricket Carnival Panama 2023'. It was contested between two equal-strength Panama teams composed of national squad members, Trinidad & Tobago and a club side, the Saville Stars. Although match reports refer 'Panama A' and 'Panama B', press reports from the time refer 'two Panama sides' and do not differentiate the squads, with players for each match picked from the same pool. At the finale, a Panama side played an all-star team made up of the best players of all the other teams (including some Colombia players). Cricket Colombia regards the matches against Panama and Trinidad & Tobago as international matches.

==== Squads ====
Colombia Paul Reid (captain), Jose Banquero, Krishnan Canagasabey, Jose Cantillo, Travis Crockett, Salim Guzman Patel, Jason Gutierrez, Jerry Kalarickal, Christopher Laas, Joe Mansfield, Chris Paine, Dian Perera, Bilverto Pulgarin, Ronal Quiroga, Santiago Rodriguez, Jean-Paul Wood.

Panama Breeze Ahir, Daman Ahir, Dilip Ahir, Divyesh Ahir, Hardik Ahir, Jignesh Ahir, Khengar Ahir, Malav Ahir, Nikunj Ahir, Rahul Ahir, Riken Ahir, Sagarkumar Ahir, Vinod Ahir, Vishal Ahir, Yahya Bawa, Abdullah Bham, Abdullah Bhoola, Siraj Boda, Ahmad Bhayat, Yusuf Bhayat, Sohel Desai, Yusuf Kachhalia, Rehman Mankda, Rizwan Mangera, Faizan Patel, Huzeifa Patel, Abdullah Bham, Parth, Imran Patel, Safvan Patel, Mohmad Sohel Patel, Sohel Patel, Vivek Patel, Vishal Raja, Ahmadi Ravat, Sufiyan Tarajiya, Irfan Tarajia.

Trinidad and Tobago Devindra Maharaj (c), Samuel Adolphus, Alpesh Ahir, Niravkumar Chhanabhai Ahir, Raj Ahir, Dary Balgobin, Malan Bharath, Sunil Dassine, Jacob Hadid, Kobus Louw, Richard Ramrekha, Matthew Swanepoel.

==== Match 1 involving Colombia ====
7 February 2023
14:30

Panama; 158/8 (20 overs)	v	Colombia; 82/8 (20 overs)
Dilip Ahir 73 (54); Paul Reid 2/26 (4 overs)		Santiago 13* (12); Nikunj Ahir 3/22 (4 overs)

Panama won by 70 runs
Gamboa, Panama.
Player of the match: Dilip Ahir (Pan)

- Panama won the toss and elected to bat.

==== Match 2 involving Colombia ====
8 February 2023
14:30

Colombia; 102/7 (20 overs)	v	Panama; 103/2 (10.3 overs)
Salim Guzman Patel 23 (28); Divyesh Ahir 2/10 (4 overs)		Malav Ahir 29 (24)

Panama won by 8 wickets
Gamboa, Panama.
Player of the match: Divyesh Ahir (Pan)

- Colombia won the toss and elected to bat.

==== Match 3 involving Colombia ====
9 February 2023
09:00

Trinidad and Tobago; 192/3 (20 overs)	v	Colombia; 159/7 (20 overs)
Devindra Maharaj 84 (68); Paul Reid 2/12 (3 overs)		Chris Paine 65 (39); Sunil Dassine 3/17 (4 overs)

Trinidad & Tobago won by 33 runs
Gamboa, Panama.
Player of the match: Dary Balgobin (Tri)

- Colombia won the toss and elected to field.

=== Amazon Cup, Colombia 2014 ===
Contested between Brazil, Peru and Colombia at Los Pinos, Bogota. Peru eliminated in round robin stage. Final between Colombia and Brazil was won by Brazil.

==== Squads ====
Colombia Ryan Butta, Travis Crockett, Andrew Farrington, Cameron Forbes, Cushal Jaiswal, Pankaj Malik, Rohit Mohan, Michael Phillips, Oliver West, Jairo Andres Venegas Vargas, Andrew Wright.

Brazil Jaiman, Allen, Richard Avery, Kamal Bishnoi, Fredrick Brunt, Greigor Caisley, Henrique Dollabella, Matthew Featherstone, Nicholas Jones, Vinod Kumar, Alexandre Miziara, Thomas Horton

Peru Nicholas Barsby, Miles Buesst, David Chaplin, Steven Hallett, Christopher Hodgson, Alex James, Nicholas Myers, Manojsonukumar Rana, Tony Salford, Hiro Sahejramani, Hansde Wit.

==== Match 1 ====
5 October 2014, 9 am

Colombia; 137/9 (20 overs)	v	Peru; 131/9 (20 overs)
Michael Phillips 41 (39); Miles Buesst 3/18 (4 overs)		Chris Hodgson 37 (46); Michael Phillips 3/35 (4 overs)

Colombia won by 6 runs
Los Pinos, Bogota, Colombia.

==== Match 2 ====
5 October 2014, 14:00

Peru; 117/6 (17 overs)	v	Brazil; 118/4 (16.1 overs)
Steven Hallett 47 (35); Richard Avery 3/35 (4 overs)		Greigor Caisley 53 (41); Miles Buesst 2/30 (4 overs)

Brazil won by 6 wickets
Los Pinos, Bogota, Colombia.

==== Match 3 ====
6 October 2014, 9:00

Brazil; 119/8 (20 overs)	v	Colombia; 121/4 (17.4 overs)
Nicholas Jones 23 (20); Rohit Mohan 2/13 (4 overs)		Rohit Mohan 41 (26); Richard Avery 2/31 (4 overs)

Colombia won by 6 wickets
Los Pinos, Bogota, Colombia.

==== Final ====
6 October 2014, 14:00

Colombia; 157/7 (20 overs)	v	Brazil; 158/4 (18.2 overs)
Cameron Forbes 64 (55); Fredrick Brunt 3/52 (4 overs)		Greigor Caisley 69 (39); Ryan Butta 2/17 (3.2 overs)

Brazil won by 6 wickets
Los Pinos, Bogota, Colombia.

=== Costa Rica tour of Colombia 2010 ===
2-match series tour by Costa Rica in Bogota. Series tied 1-1. These are currently the first international cricket matches of Colombia recognised by Cricket Colombia.

==== Squads ====
Colombia Peter Dale (joint captain), Patrick Raikes (joint captain), Julian Abelson, Jim Atkinson, Ben Brown, Ed Dallas, Ed Davey, Andy Farrington, Mark Farrington, Camilo Fonseca, Mick Geddes, Peter Goodhew, Sebastian Hiperson, Sebastian Lonsdale, Ben Morriss, Andrew Priestley, Kauchar Sheth, Danny Thorpe, Matt Wilkinson, Andrew Wright, Burney Zaheer.

Costa Rica Julian Olivier (Captain), Fabian Arce, Sam Arthur, Tim Baker, Karavadi Chandrasekar, David Crisp, Armando Foster, Richard Illingworth, Albert Pfister, Andy McQuaid, Sudesh Pillai, Chris Prasad, Ben Smith.

==== Match 1 ====
24 April 2010

Colombia; 84/9 (25 overs)	v	Costa Rica; 90/2 (20.4 overs)
Kauchar Sheth 17; Chris Prasad 3/14		Ben Smith 35*

Cost Rica won by 8 wickets
Bogota Sports Club.
Player of the match: Ben Smith (CRI)

==== Match 2 ====
25 April 2010

Colombia; 160 all out (29.3 overs)	v	Costa Rica; 70 all out (24.3 overs)
Mick Geddes 31; Tim Baker 2/18		Julian Olivier (16); Andrew Farrington 2/12

Colombia won by 90 runs
Bogota Sports Club.
Player of the match: Andrew Farrington (Col)

== Grounds ==
Cricket is played regularly at the following grounds in Colombia:

=== Bogota (2) ===
(1) Bogota Sports Club - since the 1960s and continues today.

(2) Los Pinos - Regular location for cricket in Colombia since 2014, including international tournaments such as 2018 South American Cricket Championships and 2014 Amazon cup)

=== Barranquilla (3) ===
(1) Marymount School Grounds, Barranquilla

(2) Combarranquilla, Solinilla, Atlantico (2025 Mexico tour of Colombia).

(3) Barranquilla Country Club

Also - net facility in Barranquilla city

=== Cali (2) ===
(1) Alto Maranon Polo Club - national tournaments since 2017.

(2) Colegio Colegio Britanico - spiritual home of Colombian cricket since the 1960s
