= Peru national cricket team =

National sports team

Peru
- Nickname: The Llamas
- Association: Peru Cricket Association

International Cricket Council
- ICC status: Associate member (2017)
- ICC region: Americas
ICC Rankings	Current	Best-ever
T20I	---	45th (12-May-2019)

International cricket
- First international: Peru v. MCC (England) (Lima, 6 February 1927)

T20 Internationals
- First T20I: v. Brazil at El Cortijo Polo Club, Lima; 3 October 2019
- Last T20I: v. Mexico at Los Pinos Polo Club Field 1, Cundinamarca; 8 August 2026
T20Is	Played	Won/Lost
Total	7	2/5 (0 ties, 0 no results)
This year	3	0/3 (0 ties, 0 no results)
T20I kit
- As of 8 August 2026

The Peru national cricket team is the team that represents Peru in international cricket. The team, which is organised by the Peru Cricket Association, became an affiliate member of the International Cricket Council (ICC) in 2007 and has been an associate member since 2017. The Peruvian national side made its international debut in 1927, represented by the Lima Cricket and Football Club, playing against a touring MCC team. Regular competition against other South American teams began in the 1960s, and has since continued.

== History ==
Peru has participated in all but one edition of the South American Championship since the first tournament in 1995, and has more recently played in ICC Americas tournaments, generally in the lower divisions.

Peru gained affiliate membership of the International Cricket Council on 29 June 2007. They have played in all but one edition of the South American Championship from 1995 onwards, hosting in 1999, 2007 and 2014, 2019.

They competed in the ICC Americas Championship from 2008 to 2011, with their best finish being 2nd in 2011.

They have also competed in the Central American Championship, in Panama City, in 2015.

=== 2018-Present ===
In April 2018, the ICC decided to grant full Twenty20 International (T20I) status to all its members. Therefore, all Twenty20 matches played between Peru and other ICC members after 1 January 2019 have the full T20I status.

Peru played their first T20I match against Brazil on 3 October 2019 during the 2019 South American Cricket Championship

3 October 2019
15:00
Scorecard

Peru; 75/5 (12 overs)	v	Brazil; 73/9 (12 overs)
Joaquin Salazar 20* (16); Richard Avery 2/16 (3 overs)		Greigor Caisley 38 (26); Matthew Spry 3/5 (2 overs)

Peru won by 2 runs
El Cortijo Polo Club Pitch 3, Lima
Umpires: Oscar Andrade (Ber) and Rakesh Jain (Per)

- Peru won the toss and elected to bat.
- The match was reduced to 12 overs per side.
- First ever T20I match for Peru.

== Grounds ==
- Lima Cricket and Football Club, Lima
- El Cortijo Polo Club, Santa Cruz de Flores
Locations of all stadiums which have hosted international cricket matches within Peru

== Tournament history ==
=== South American Cricket Championship ===
- 1995: 3rd place
- 1907: 3rd place
- 1999: 4th place
- 2000: 6th place
- 2002: Did not participate
- 2004: group stage
- 2007: group stage
- 2009: 4th place
- 2011: 3rd place
- 2013: 4th place
- 2014: 4th place
- 2015: 6th place
- 2016: 3rd place
- 2017: 5th place
- 2018: 5th place
- 2019: 3rd place
- 2022: 7th place
- 2023: 6th place
- 2024: 5th place
- 2025: 6th place
- 2026: 6th place

=== ICC Americas Championship ===
Cricket Peru men's team - the 'Llamas' - competed three times in the ICC Americas Division III, an officially sanctioned ranking tournament, overseen by the International Cricket Council that offered a pathway to World League Cricket and potentially to playing in the World Cup.

- 2000–06: Did not participate
- 2008: Division Three – 4th place
- 2009: Division Three – 4th place
- 2011: Division Three – 2nd place

1. Buenos Aires, Argentina: 12 – 16 Feb, 2008

This was a 50-over tournament, played at different venues in Buenos Aires, featuring 5 teams - Belize, Brazil, Chile, Peru and Turks & Caicos Islands - that had a stunning climax with three teams in a position to win the tournament before the final ball of the tournament. The eventual winners were the Turks and Caicos Islands, who were promoted to Division II.

Second place went to Chile on account of their lower net run rate. Belize finished third.

Peru, captained by Chris Abbott for the first match and Harry Hildebrand for the second and third matches, lost their first three games, but on the last day of the tournament, pulled off an upset by defeating Brazil, thereby securing fourth place, with Brazil in 5th.

2. Santiago, Chile: 9 - 12 Oct, 2009

Again this was a 50-over tournament, played at Craighouse in Santiago, Chile, with only 4 teams: Belize, Brazil, Chile & Peru. The Llamas, under the captaincy of Miles Buesst, lost all their games to finish fourth, but came close to defeating eventual champions, Brazil, in their final match, falling 17 short chasing 253.

3. San Jose, Costa Rica: 14–18 March 2011

The format of this tournament was changed to T20, and featured 6 teams: Belize, Brazil, Chile, hosts Costa Rica, Falkland Islands and Peru, playing at Los Reyes Polo Club on the outskirts of San Jose. The shorter format suited the Llamas' style of play, and Peru, captained by Miles Buesst (and Mike Soulsby, for one match) enjoyed their most successful international tournament to date, with a record of four wins out of five, and a highly creditable 2nd-place finish. The only loss was to the eventual undefeated champions, Belize, on the first morning.

Success was based on a disciplined bowling unit of Miles Buesst, Nadeem Ahmed, Javed Iqbal, Tony Sanford and Dinesh Ekanayake, taking advantage of the low bounce of the wickets, and a large, slow outfield, backed up by good fielding, to starve batsmen of runs and force them into errors. Runs were at a premium on the two pitches used, and so batsmen had to be patient and correct to weather the initial storm of the opposition’s top bowlers, before making hay against the lesser bowlers. This approach was typified by Mike Soulsby’s masterly half century, off 63 balls, against Chile, that won him the Man of the Match award.

Seemingly low T20 scores of under a hundred against Chile and Costa Rica were easily defended, and even the free-scoring Belizean batsmen took 14 overs to score 65, losing 6 wickets along the way, and indicating that the ball would dominate the bat for most of the Championship. This was certainly the case against Mexico, who batting first, were rolled over for 49; and then the Falkland Islands were dismissed for 22, the lowest score of the tournament, as some of Peru’s second-string bowlers came to the fore.

2011 Squad:

The following list contains the 13 players in Peru's squad for the World Cricket League Americas Division Three 2011:

- Miles Buesst (Captain)
- Chris Abbott (Wk)
- Mike Soulsby (Vice Captain)
- Dinesh Ekanayake
- Nadeem Ansari
- Javed Iqbal
- Julian Walter
- Manoj Rana
- Suresh Kumar
- Hiro Sahijramani
- Tony Sanford
- Nick Appleyard
- John Bell

After the tournament in 2011, ICC policy changed, with the focus shifting away from High Performance Cricket to increasing Participation Numbers. This decision was driven by an economic imperative. It was no longer part of Affiliate Membership Criteria to play in an international competition. As a result, Division Three of the ICC Americas Championship was scrapped, meaning that Peru – along with Brazil, Chile, Costa Rica, Mexico and the Falkland Islands – was no longer included in any ICC-sponsored tournament.

There is no short to mid-term prospect of Peru being invited back to international ICC competitions.

=== South American Championship ===
The Llamas had been participating in the biennial South American Championships (SAC) since 1995. In the wake of the ICC decision to scrap the ICC Americas Div III tournament, it was decided to make the SAC an annual T20 Easter championship, with the hosting rotating between the four members of Cricket South America.

Since 2013 the tournament has been played annually. In April 2014, it was the turn of Cricket Peru to host SAC XI. For the first time, Mexico were invited to join the tournament, which they did with great enthusiasm - so much so that they actually won the tournament, defeating Chile in the final, thereby taking the trophy out of South America for the first time!

Chile had won three games out of four leading up to the Final, but Brazil, Mexico and Peru had all won two games each; and so qualification to face Chile came down to wickets lost.

2015's SAC XII, held in Santiago, Chile, saw a further expansion, with Colombia added to the line-up to make a 6-team competition. After the group stage, with all teams playing each other once, Argentina, Brazil and Chile all had four victories each; on account of their superior run rate, Argentina and Brazil advanced to the final, which was won comfortably by the youthful Argentinean side.

Meanwhile, Peru had a disappointing tournament, playing good cricket in patches, and being generally competitive, without being able to string together a victory. A number of dropped catches in the deep proved costly over the course of the four days.

The SAC XIII in Rio de Janeiro, in October 2016, saw an upturn in the Llama fortunes, with Peru claiming the bronze medal by winning three out of five games, against hosts Brazil, Mexico and Colombia. Moreover, this was the first time that a Peruvian player had picked up an individual award at a S.A.C., as veteran all-rounder Miles Buesst, picked up the Bowling Award for his 11 wickets, and the overall Most Valuable Player award for his combined contribution with bat (181 runs) and ball.

Peru's only losses were to the Championship finalists, Argentina and Chile. In a thrilling finale, underdogs Chile sprang a surprise on eight-time winners, Argentina, chasing down 164 with 2 wickets and 2 balls to spare.

=== Central American Championship ===
After the success of the expanded 2014 South American Championships in Lima, Cricket Panama were inspired to invite additional teams to their March 2015 Central American Championship (CAC) in Panama City. The invitees that accepted were Peru, Brazil and M.C.C, who took their place alongside regulars Mexico, Costa Rica, El Salvador and, of course, Panama.

Another of the CAC regulars, Belize, pulled out at the eleventh hour, and their place was taken by a Panama A side, to keep the number of teams at eight, divided into two groups of four, playing T20 games.

The Llamas first match, on March 17, was against the M.C.C, who had just been on the wrong end of a hard-fought series in Suriname, and were in no mood to be generous. Featuring a number of County players and ex-players, they racked up an imposing 200 for 8 off their 20 overs. Peru, batting second, were never in the hunt and faltered to 79, for a chastening loss.

The next game was against old sparring partners, Brazil, on March 18. Again Peru bowled first and did well to keep the Brazil score down to 141 for 8. The reply started well, with Hallett, Soulsby and Myers all making quick runs, but after a mid-innings stutter, the run rate started to climb alarmingly. Some good late innings clubbing, and hard running, from man-of-the-match Buesst (35*) and Chaplin (5*), saw Peru home with 3 balls to spare, for a famous 5-wicket victory.

The last group game was against Panama A on the morning of March 19. Batting first, Peru racked up 147 for 9 off their 20 overs, with Soulsby (39), Buesst (35) and Myers (29) the main contributors. In a mirror image of the game the day before, the Panama A reply got off to a fast start and then faltered in the middle overs, as they lost wickets and the run rate increased. However, they got over the line with 3 balls to spare, and 5 wickets in hand, thanks to some good death batting.

The upshot of these group games was that Peru came third in the group, thereby missing out on progressing to the semi-final stage. They were able to take solace in a victory, that afternoon, over Costa Rica, who had come also third in their group, to claim 5th place. Drained from the morning's narrow loss, Peru's batsman struggled to a total of 109 for 8 from their 20 overs, with Soulsby and Myers again in the runs. However, the bowlers, led by Spry (3 for 12) and Roughton (3 for 14) and backed up by some good fielding, did enough to keep the Costa Rica batting line-up down to a total of 91 all out.

Thus the Llamas tournament ended with a record of two wins and two losses.

=== Amistad Cup ===
The development of cricket in Peru and Brazil has followed quite similar trajectories since their acceptance as Affiliate Members of the ICC in the early 2000s, with a small group of keen volunteers facing sizable geographical and cultural challenges. This has led to a close friendship off the pitch - with the sharing of ideas and resources - and a healthy rivalry on the pitch.

To encapsulate this relationship, in 2011 it was decided to inaugurate the Amistad Cup (actually a Thermos flask), which would be awarded to the winner of any men's cricket game between Peru and Brazil. The loser would be given the dubious prize of The Spork (half spoon, half fork), which was found as a hidden extra in the lid of the Thermos!

Peru is the current holder of the Amistad Cup, having defeated Brazil by 8 wickets in the 2016 South American Championship.

=== Coca Cup ===
October 2014 was the date of the inaugural Coca Cup, a tri-nation T20 series between Peru, Brazil and non-ICC affiliated Colombia. The venue was Bogota Sports Club, located just outside Colombia's capital city.

The tournament opened with Colombia v Peru on the morning of Sat, 4 October. Chasing 138 to win, Peru looked to be cruising to victory at 121 for 4 in the 17th over. However, a flurry of wickets, coupled with brainless batting, saw the Llamas fall 6 runs short, finishing on 131 for 9 after 20 overs.

The afternoon's game was Peru v Brazil. Peru batted first and had reached 117 for 6 off 17 overs, when rain halted play. When play resumed, it was decided that Brazil should start batting immediately. Brazil opener, Gregor Caisley, set about getting the runs in double-quick time, before bad light brought a premature end to proceedings, with Brazil in a strong position. The Brazil innings was finished the next day, Sunday. After a slight wobble, where Brazil lost 3 quick wickets, they overtook the Peru total with 5 balls to spare.

So two close losses meant that Peru missed out on the Final. This was played out between Brazil and Colombia, on the afternoon of Sunday, 5 October. Colombia had convincingly beaten Brazil that morning, in the group game; and having scored 157 for 7 in their 20 overs, were confident of taking the trophy. However, Caisley had other ideas, bludgeoning 69 in just 39 balls to take a large chunk out of the total. When he was out, Nick Jones, 24*, took up the mantle, and the Brazil batsmen passed the Colombia total for the loss of 4 wickets, with 10 balls to spare, to claim the first Coca Cup.

== Records ==
International Match Summary — Peru

Last updated 8 August 2026

Playing Record
Format	M	W	L	T	NR	Inaugural Match
Twenty20 Internationals	7	2	5	0	0	3 October 2019

=== Twenty20 International ===
- Highest team total: 153/6 (18 overs) v. Chile on 5 October 2019 at El Cortijo Polo Club, Lima.
- Highest individual score: 38, Shaikh Ashraf v. Chile on 5 October 2019 at El Cortijo Polo Club, Lima.
- Best individual bowling figures: 4/8, Matthew Spry v. Chile on 5 October 2019 at El Cortijo Polo Club, Lima.

Most T20I runs for Peru

Player	Runs	Average	Career span
Pravin Shamdasani	109	21 80	2019–2026
Shaikh Ashraf	82	20.50	2019–2019
Harshil Brahmbhatt	76	25.33	2026–2026
Hafez Farooq	69	17.25	2019–2019
Joaquin Salazar	50	12.50	2019–2026

Most T20I wickets for Peru

Player	Wickets	Average	Career span
Pravin Shamdasani	8	15.62	2019–2026
Waqar Khan	8	10.75	2019–2019
Matthew Spry	7	8.85	2019–2019
Richard Chatterton	5	15.80	2026–2026
Suresh Kumar	5	24.80	2019–2026

T20I record versus other nations

Records complete to T20I #4062. Last updated 8 August 2026.

Opponent	M	W	L	T	NR	First match	First win
vs Associate Members
Argentina	1	0	1	0	0	4 October 2019	
Brazil	2	1	1	0	0	3 October 2019	3 October 2019
Chile	1	1	0	0	0	5 October 2019	5 October 2019
Mexico	2	0	2	0	0	5 October 2019	
Panama	1	0	1	0	0	8 August 2026	

=== Other matches ===
For a list of selected international matches played by Peru, see Cricket Archive.

== See also ==
- List of Peru Twenty20 International cricketers
- Peru women's national cricket team
