= ICC Americas Championship =

Cricket Tournament

- Administrator: ICC Americas
- Format: List A
- First edition: 2000
- Tournament format: League system
- Number of teams: 17 nations
- Current champion: Canada
- Most successful: Canada (4 titles)

The ICC Americas Championship is a one-day cricket tournament organised by ICC Americas for non-Test national cricket teams in the Americas affiliated with the International Cricket Council. As well as providing the opportunity for national teams to play international matches against teams of a similar standard, it also provides qualification into the ICC World Cricket League.

There are currently four divisions taking place biannually with promotion and relegation taking place between divisions. In 2010 Division One, for the first time, a Twenty20 tournament took place following the traditional 50 over competition.

== History ==
The ICC Americas Championship first took place in 2000 between the five associate teams in the region. 2006 saw the championship evolve into a league system with three divisions allowing most of the affiliate nations in the region to participate. This coincided with the introduction of the World Cricket League, an ICC initiative to give all cricket playing nations a chance to qualify for the Cricket World Cup. In 2010, a fourth division was added meaning that all members in the region were able to take part in the league system.

Typically, the team finishing first is promoted and the lowest place team is relegated to the division below where possible. The only occasion this did not happen was in 2008 when Turks and Caicos Islands retained their Division Two spot despite finishing last.

== Tournaments ==
=== 2000 ===
The 2000 tournament was held in Ontario, Canada, at the Maple Leaf Cricket Club and G Ross Lord Park. Then affiliate member the Cayman Islands gained a surprise victory over Argentina, and the tournament itself went down to the final day. Canada and Bermuda were level on six points each going into their final game. Bermuda batted first and were dismissed for 186, with Dennis Archer top scoring with 59, with John Davison and Nicholas Ifill taking three wickets each for the home team. When Canada batted, they lost their first two wickets quickly, but Nicholas Ifill (completing a fine all-round performance with an unbeaten 78) and Joseph Harris (who scored 60) putting on a 122 run partnership, before Ifill and Paul Prashad steered them home for the seven wicket win.

Team	Played	Won	Lost	Tied	NR	Points
Canada	4	4	0	0	0	8
Bermuda	4	3	1	0	0	6
United States	4	2	2	0	0	4
Cayman Islands	4	1	3	0	0	2
Argentina	4	0	4	0	0	0

=== 2002 ===
The 2002 tournament was held in Argentina and saw the debut of the Bahamas. The home side were disappointed to go without a win, again losing to the affiliate member in the tournament. The USA won the tournament after rain washed out the final day, ending Canada's hopes of winning the tournament for the second time in a row.

Team	Played	Won	Lost	Tied	NR	Points	NRR
United States	5	4	0	0	1	9	1.24
Canada	5	3	1	0	1	7	0.42
Cayman Islands	5	3	1	0	1	7	1.48
Bermuda	5	1	3	0	1	3	-0.29
Bahamas	5	1	3	0	1	3	-1.88
Argentina	5	0	4	0	1	1	-0.77

=== 2004 ===
The 2004 tournament was held in Bermuda, and featured the same teams as in the 2002 tournament. It was won for the second time by Canada, who went unbeaten throughout the tournament.

Team	Played	Won	Lost	Tied	NR	Points	NRR
Canada	5	5	0	0	0	20	2.105
United States	5	4	1	0	0	16	1.358
Bermuda	5	3	2	0	0	12	0.944
Cayman Islands	5	2	3	0	0	8	-0.198
Argentina	5	1	4	0	0	4	-2.007
Bahamas	5	0	5	0	0	0	-2.233

=== 2006 ===
The 2006 tournament was played over three divisions, a format that is intended to continue in future with promotion and relegation between the divisions.

==== Division Three ====
The 2006 Division Three tournament was held in Suriname and saw the official ICC debuts of Brazil and Chile. The tournament was won by Suriname who gained promotion to Division Two.

Team	Played	Won	Lost	Tied	NR	Points	NRR
Suriname	3	3	0	0	0	12	2.890
Turks and Caicos Islands	3	2	1	0	0	8	-0.222
Chile	3	1	2	0	0	4	0.030
Brazil	3	0	3	0	0	0	-1.944

==== Division Two ====
The 2006 Division Two tournament was held in and won by Argentina after they beat the Bahamas in what was the deciding group games.

Team	Played	Won	Lost	Tied	NR	Points	NRR
Argentina	4	4	0	0	0	16	1.220
Bahamas	4	3	1	0	0	12	2.106
Panama	4	2	2	0	0	8	-0.530
Suriname	4	1	0	0	3	4	-0.681
Belize	4	0	4	0	0	0	-1.825

==== Division One ====
The 2006 Division One tournament was held in Canada. The hosts started poorly, losing to Bermuda and the Cayman Islands, and were unable to repeat their 2004 performance, finishing third. The tournament was won by Bermuda for the first time. The tournament also functioned as qualifying for the World Cricket League for Argentina and the Cayman Islands (the other three were already in the tournament). The Caymans finished fourth, giving them a spot in Division Three in 2007, and Argentina a spot in Division Five in 2008.

Team	Played	Won	Lost	Tied	NR	Points	NRR
Bermuda	4	3	0	0	1	14	1.420
United States	4	2	1	0	1	10	0.485
Canada	4	2	2	0	0	8	1.056
Cayman Islands	4	2	2	0	0	8	-0.257
Argentina	4	0	4	0	0	0	-2.469

=== 2008 ===
==== Division Three ====
The Division Three tournament was held in Argentina from 11 to 16 February and was the debut competition for Peru. Turks and Caicos Islands were the champions and were promoted to Division Two.

Team	Played	Won	Lost	Tied	NR	Points	NRR
Turks and Caicos Islands	4	3	1	0	0	12	1.424
Chile	4	3	1	0	0	12	0.410
Belize	4	2	2	0	0	8	0.720
Peru	4	1	3	0	0	4	-0.782
Brazil	4	1	3	0	0	4	-1.436

==== Division Two ====
The Division Two tournament was held from 3–5 April and was won narrowly by the hosts, Suriname. Three of the four teams finished on 8 points but Suriname were promoted due to having the highest net run rate. Although newly promoted Turks and Caicos Islands finished in last place they remained in the division for the 2010 competition.

Team	Played	Won	Lost	Tied	NR	Points	NRR
Suriname	3	2	1	0	0	8	1.513
Bahamas	3	2	1	0	0	8	1.023
Panama	3	2	1	0	0	8	-0.055
Turks and Caicos Islands	3	0	3	0	0	0	-2.734

==== Division One ====
The Division One tournament was held in Florida from 25 to 30 November and saw the hosts, USA winning fairly comfortably. As a result, they now equaled Canada in winning the ICC Americas Championship twice. Suriname lost all their games and so were relegated back to Division Two for the 2010 competition.

Team	Played	Won	Lost	Tied	NR	Points	NRR
United States	5	5	0	0	0	20	2.822
Bermuda	5	3	1	0	1	14	1.785
Canada	5	3	1	0	1	14	1.714
Cayman Islands	5	2	3	0	0	8	-0.719
Argentina	5	1	4	0	0	4	-1.253
Suriname	5	0	5	0	0	0	-3.698

Peru debuted in Division Three. Suriname gained a place in Division One, but was relegated later to Division Two, and Turks and Caicos Islands gained a place in Division Two, but was relegated later to Division Three.

=== 2009-10 ===
==== Division Three ====
The 2009 Americas Division Three was held from 9–12 October in Santiago, Chile. Brazil won the tournament, remaining undefeated, and qualified for 2010 Americas Division Two.

Team	Played	Won	Lost	Tied	NR	Points	NRR
Brazil	3	3	0	0	0	6	0.774
Belize	3	2	1	0	0	4	0.633
Chile	3	1	2	0	0	2	0.441
Peru	3	0	3	0	0	0	-1.773

==== Division Two ====
The 2010 Americas Division Two was held from 1–6 February in Nassau, Bahamas. Bahamas won obtaining not only promotion to Division One, but also a place in 2010 WCL Division Eight. Newly promoted Brazil had a disappointing setback after their captain, Matt Featherstone, suffered a back injury just days before the team's departure. They lost all their matches and were relegated back to Division Three.

Team	Played	Won	Lost	Tied	NR	Points	NRR
Bahamas	4	3	1	0	0	6	3.253
Suriname	4	3	1	0	0	6	1.027
Panama	4	3	1	0	0	6	0.853
Turks and Caicos Islands	4	1	3	0	0	2	-1.660
Brazil	4	0	4	0	0	0	-2.377

==== Division One ====
The 2010 Americas Division One tournament took place from 27 May – 7 June in Bermuda. The hosts were joined by Argentina, Bahamas, Canada, Cayman Islands and USA. It consisted of a T20 Tournament and a 50 over tournament where Canada was crowned the 50 over champion undefeated and Bahamas was relegated to Division 2 after a thrilling tie against Argentina in the last match. If they had won, Argentina would have been relegated to Division 2 on NRR. USA won the T20 Tournament beating Canada in the finals.

Team	Played	Won	Lost	Tied	NR	Points	NRR
Canada	5	5	0	0	0	10	+2.598
United States	5	4	1	0	0	8	+1.661
Bermuda	5	3	2	0	0	6	+1.484
Argentina	5	1	3	1	0	3	–1.750
Cayman Islands	5	1	4	0	0	2	–1.380
Bahamas	5	0	4	1	0	1	–2.448

==== Division Four ====
In 2010, the inaugural Americas Division Four tournament was announced and it took place in Mexico City from 13 to 19 June 2010.

The participating teams were Mexico (the host team), Costa Rica and the Falkland Islands. All the participants were playing in a World Cricket League competition for the first time.

Cuba withdrew from the tournament due to travel restrictions placed on the players by the Cuban government.

A 50 over tournament over the first three days was followed by a 20 over tournament over the remaining two days.

Mexico won both tournaments, winning all four of their games.

50 over tournament

Team	Played	Won	Lost	Tied	NR	Points	NRR
Mexico	2	2	0	0	0	4	+2.867
Falkland Islands	2	1	1	0	0	2	–1.720
Costa Rica	2	0	2	0	0	0	–0.954
Cuba	withdrew						

20 over tournament

Team	Played	Won	Lost	Tied	NR	Points	NRR
Mexico	2	2	0	0	0	4	
Costa Rica	2	1	1	0	0	2	
Falkland Islands	2	0	2	0	0	0	
Cuba	withdrew						

=== 2011 ===
In this tournament, all the divisions consisted of the T20 format and not of the 50-over format. However, this is the 7th edition of the ICC Americas Championship.

==== Division Three ====
The 2011 Americas Division Three was held 13–20 March in Costa Rica. Belize won the tournament, while being undefeated, and qualified for 2011 Americas Division Two. But the hosts ended in 5th place. Cuba did not participate due to flight restrictions.

Team	Played	Won	Lost	Tied	NR	Points	NRR
Belize	5	5	0	0	0	10	
Peru	5	4	1	0	0	8	
Chile	5	3	2	0	0	6	
Mexico	5	2	3	0	0	4	
Costa Rica	5	1	4	0	0	2	
Falkland Islands	5	0	5	0	0	0	

==== Division Two ====
The 2011 Americas Division Two which took place from 10 to 17 April was held in Suriname and won by Suriname which qualified for 2011 Americas Division One. Panama, Belize, and Turks and Caicos had the same number of points, but were placed in their respective places by their net run rate. Brazil ended last place for the second time.

Team	Played	Won	Lost	Tied	NR	Points	NRR
Suriname	5	4	1	0	0	8	
Panama	5	3	2	0	0	6	
Belize	5	3	2	0	0	6	
Turks and Caicos Islands	5	3	2	0	0	6	
Bahamas	5	2	3	0	0	4	
Brazil	5	0	5	0	0	0	

==== Division One ====
The 2011 Americas Division One took place between 17 and 24 July and was held in Fort Lauderdale, Florida, USA. Canada won the tournament for the 4th time and the hosts ended as runners-up and Argentina came back to Division Two that will be held in 2013.

Team	Played	Won	Lost	Tied	NR	Points	NRR
Canada	5	5	0	0	0	10	
United States	5	4	1	0	0	8	
Bermuda	5	3	2	0	0	6	
Cayman Islands	5	2	3	0	0	4	
Suriname	5	1	4	0	0	2	
Argentina	5	0	5	0	0	0	

=== 2013 ===
==== Division 2 ====
In this tournament, which was won by hosts, was held in Nassau, Bahamas

Team	Played	Won	Lost	Tied	NR	Points	NRR
Bahamas	4	4	0	0	0	6	
Panama	4	2	2	0	0	4	
Belize	4	2	2	0	0	4	
Argentina	4	1	3	0	0	2	
Turks and Caicos Islands	4	1	3	0	0	2	

== Champions ==
=== Division One ===
Year	Venue	Champions	Runner-Up
2000	(Canada); Toronto	Canada	Bermuda
2002	(Argentina); Buenos Aires	United States	Canada
2004	Bermuda	Canada	United States
2006	(Canada); Toronto	Bermuda	United States
2008	(United States); Fort Lauderdale	United States	Bermuda
2010	Bermuda	Canada	United States
2011	(United States); Fort Lauderdale	Canada	United States
2013	(Canada); Toronto	United States	Bermuda

=== Division Two ===
Year	Venue	Champions	Runner-Up
2006	(Argentina); Buenos Aires	Argentina	Bahamas
2008	(Suriname); Paramaribo	Suriname	Bahamas
2010	(The Bahamas); Nassau	Bahamas	Suriname
2011	(Suriname); Paramaribo	Suriname	Panama
2013	(The Bahamas); Nassau	Bahamas	Panama

=== Division Three ===
Year	Venue	Champions	Runner-Up
2006	(Suriname); Paramaribo	Suriname	Turks and Caicos Islands
2008	(Argentina); Buenos Aires	Turks and Caicos Islands	Chile
2009	(Chile); Santiago	Brazil	Belize
2011	Costa Rica	Belize	Peru

=== Division Four ===
Year	Venue	Champions	Runner-Up
2010	(Mexico); Naucalpan	Mexico	Falkland Islands

== See also ==
- ICC Americas
- South American Cricket Championship
- World Cricket League
