= Panama Cricket Association =

Sports governing body in Panama

The Panama Cricket Association is the official governing body of the sport of cricket in Panama.

In 2002, the Panama Cricket Association became an affiliate member of the International Cricket Council; it became an associate member in 2017, when affiliate membership was abolished. The Panama Cricket Association is included in the ICC Americas region.

== See also ==
- Panama national cricket team
