= Mexico national cricket team =

Mexico
- Nickname: Cricket Vultures
- Association: Mexico Cricket Association

Personnel
- Captain: Shantanu Kaveri
- Coach: Jon Bonfiglio
- Manager: Jack Little

International Cricket Council
- ICC status: Associate member (2017)
- ICC region: Americas
ICC Rankings	Current	Best-ever
T20I	73rd	46th (1-May-2021)

International cricket
- First international: 19 March 2006 v Costa Rica at Ladyville, Belize

T20 Internationals
- First T20I: v. Belize at Reforma Athletic Club, Naucalpan; 25 April 2019
- Last T20I: v. Peru at Los Pinos Polo Club Field 1, Cundinamarca; 8 August 2026
T20Is	Played	Won/Lost
Total	44	18/25 (0 ties, 1 no result)
This year	14	6/8 (0 ties, 0 no results)
T20I kit
- As of 8 August 2026

The Mexican national cricket team represents Mexico in international cricket. They became an affiliate member of the International Cricket Council (ICC) in 2004. Their international debut was in 2006 against Costa Rica. The team made their ICC Americas Championship debut in June 2010 and in 2011 participated in the ICC Americas Division 3 tournament in Costa Rica. Mexico has also participated in the South American Championship in 2014 and 2018, winning the title on both occasions. In 2017, they became an associate member of the ICC.

In April 2018, the ICC decided to grant full Twenty20 International (T20I) status to all its members. Therefore, all Twenty20 matches played between Mexico and other ICC members after 1 January 2019 have the full T20I status.

== History ==
Mexico became an affiliate member of the ICC in 2004. Their first international match was played on 19 March 2006 in the Central American Cricket Championship against Costa Rica who they beat. Prior to this there had been teams based in Mexico City that had played against Belize but these were not recognised as international fixtures. Having beaten Costa Rica in the tournament they then lost to Belize finishing second.

In 2007, Mexico hosted the Central American Cricket Championship and won it by defeating Costa Rica and El Salvador.

In 2008, Mexico travelled to El Salvador to take part in the 2nd Easter Cup. They finished second, losing to Belize but winning easily against El Salvador.

Mexico took part in the 3rd Central American Championship in 2009 in Panama under the new Twenty20 format. Mexico performed well in the tournament, winning all but one of their matches and even defeating close rivals Belize in a close fought match. As a result, they finished 2nd in the tournament.

In 2011, Mexico competed in the ICC Division 3 Americas tournament in Costa Rica finishing in 4th place.

In 2012, a youthful Mexico team participated in the 4th Volcano Cup in El Salvador finishing runners up to the hosts after defeating Guatemala.

=== 2018-present ===
In April 2018, the ICC decided to grant full Twenty20 International (T20I) status to all its members. Therefore, all Twenty20 matches played between Mexico and other ICC members after 1 January 2019 have the full T20I status.

Mexico played their first ever Twenty20 International match against Belize in the 2019 Central American Cricket Championship.

25 April 2019
08:00
Scorecard

Mexico; 108/9 (20 overs)	v	Belize; 112/6 (12.3 overs)
Pradeep Chandran 23 (28); Aaron Muslar 3/18 (4 overs)		Bernan Stephenson 48 (27); Rama Inampud 2/29 (4 overs)

Belize won by 4 wickets
Reforma Athletic Club, Naucalpan
Umpires: Supratim Das (Mex) and Kanti Lal Patel (Mex)
Player of the match: Bernan Stephenson (Blz)

- Belize won the toss and elected to field.
- First ever T20I match for Mexico.

== Grounds ==
- Reforma Athletic Club, Naucalpan
- Las Cabellerizas Cricket Ground, Dos Ríos, Mexico
Locations of all stadiums which have hosted international cricket matches within Mexico

== Tournament history ==
=== T20 Americas Sub-regional Qualifiers ===
T20 World Cup Americas Sub-regional Qualifiers records
Host/Year	Round	Position	GP	W	L	T	NR
(United States) 2018	Did not participate						
(Argentina) 2023	Did not participate						
(Argentina) 2024	Round-robin	6/9	8	2	6	0	0
(Cayman Islands) 2026	Round-robin	4/4	6	1	5	0	0
Total	0 Titles	2/4	14	3	11	0	0

=== South American Championship ===
South American Cricket Championship records
Year	Round	Position	GP	W	L	T	NR
(Argentina) 1995	Did not participate						
(Argentina) 1997	Did not participate						
(Peru) 1999	Did not participate						
(Argentina) 2000	Did not participate						
(Argentina) 2002	Did not participate						
(Chile) 2004	Did not participate						
(Peru) 2007	Did not participate						
(Brazil) 2009	Did not participate						
(Chile) 2011	Did not participate						
(Argentina) 2013	Did not participate						
(Peru) 2014	Champions	Records not available					
(Chile) 2015	Round-robin	4/6	5	2	3	0	0
(Brazil) 2016	Round-robin	6/6	5	0	5	0	0
(Argentina) 2017	Round-robin	6/7	6	1	5	0	0
(Colombia) 2018	Champions	1/8	8	8	0	0	0
(Peru) 2019	Runners-up	2/7	7	4	3	0	0
(Brazil) 2022	Round-robin	4/7	6	4	2	0	0
(Argentina) 2023	Semi-finals	4/8	5	2	3	0	0
(Brazil) 2024	Play-offs	4/8	4	1	2	0	1
(Brazil) 2025	Champions	1/6	5	4	0	0	1
(Colombia) 2026	Qualified						
Total	3 Titles	11/20	51	26	23	0	2

=== Central American Championship ===
Central American Championship records
Host/Year	Round	Position	GP	W	L	T	NR
(Belize) 2001	Did not participate						
(Belize) 2006	Runners-up	2/3	2	1	1	0	0
(Mexico) 2007	Champions	1/3	Records not available				
(Costa Rica) 2009	Runners-up	2/5	Records not available				
(Panama) 2015	3rd place	3/6	Records not available				
(Mexico) 2019	Round-robin	4/5	4	1	3	0	0
(Belize) 2023	Runners-up	2/5	5	3	2	0	0
(Costa Rica) 2024	Champions	1/2	5	3	2	0	0
(Panama) 2025	Champions	1/4	4	2	1	0	1
(Mexico) 2026	Did not participate						
Total (Note: Complete records of some tournaments are unavailable.)	3 Titles	8/10	20	10	9	0	1

=== Other tournaments ===
ICC Americas Championship
- 2000–2008: Did not participate
- 2009-10 (Division four): Winners — promoted
- 2011 (Division three): 4th place

== Current squad ==
Updated as on 17 April 2025

This lists all the active players who played for Mexico in the 2025 Men's Central American Championship.

Name	Age	Batting style	Bowling style	Last T20I	Note(s)
Batters
Kashigoud Patil	36	Right-handed	—N/a	(Panama) 2025	
Puneet Arora	40	Right-handed	Right-arm medium	(The Bahamas) 2024	
Rupesh Singh	38	Left-handed	Right-arm off break	(The Bahamas) 2024	
Anurag Tripathi	39	Right-handed	Right-arm medium	(Panama) 2025	
Praveen Santhanakrishnan	39	Right-handed	—N/a	(Panama) 2025	
Jagdeesh Umanath	44	Right-handed	Right-arm medium	(Panama) 2025	
Sanjay Wagh	36	Right-handed	Right-arm off break	(Panama) 2025	
All-rounders
Shantanu Kaveri	47	Right-handed	Right-arm medium	(Panama) 2025	Captain
Shashikant Laxman	45	Right-handed	Right-arm medium	(Panama) 2025	Vice-captain
Revanakumar Ankad	48	Right-handed	Right-arm medium	(Turks and Caicos Islands) 2025	
Devjani Mutreja	18	Right-handed	Right-arm medium	(Panama) 2025	
Dhananjaya Panda	28	Right-handed	Right-arm medium-fast	(Panama) 2025	
Luis Hermida	43	Right-handed	Right-arm medium-fast	(Panama) 2025	
Wicket-keepers
Rohit Poojary	38	Right-handed	—N/a	(Panama) 2025	
Kaushal Kumar	47	Right-handed	—N/a	(Turks and Caicos Islands) 2025	
Pace bowlers
Yashvanth Jasti	30	Left-handed	Left-arm medium	(Argentina) 2024	
Pradeep Mohanarangam	33	Right-handed	Right-arm medium	(The Bahamas) 2024	
Shoaib Rafiq	37	Right-handed	Right-arm medium-fast	(The Bahamas) 2024	
Pratik Singh Bais	28	Right-handed	Right-arm medium-fast	(Panama) 2025	

== Records ==
International match summary — Mexico

Last updated 8 August 2026

Playing Record
Format	M	W	L	T	NR	Inaugural Match
Twenty20 Internationals	44	18	25	0	1	25 April 2019

=== Twenty20 International ===
- Highest team total: 204/5 v Costa Rica on 2 April 2026 at Reforma Athletic Club, Naucalpan.
- Highest individual score: 73, Amir Butt v Costa Rica on 2 April 2026 at Reforma Athletic Club, Naucalpan.
- Best individual bowling figures: 6/14, Pratik Singh Bais v Costa Rica on 14 April 2024 at Los Reyes Polo Club, Guácima.

Most T20I runs for Mexico

Player	Runs	Average	Career span
Shantanu Kaveri	506	18.07	2019–2026
Dhananjaya Panda	273	21.00	2025–2026
Praveen Santhanakrishnan	262	14.55	2024–2025
Shashikant Laxman	253	10.54	2019–2026
Jayanth Byrappa	248	20.66	2025–2026

Most T20I wickets for Mexico

Player	Wickets	Average	Career span
Pratik Singh Bais	36	16.83	2023–2026
Shoaib Rafiq	25	11.76	2023–2026
Shashikant Hirugade	24	16.94	2019–2026
Luis Hermida	20	15.15	2019–2025
Dhananjaya Panda	19	17.68	2025–2026
Revanakumar Ankad	19	18.05	2019–2025

T20I record versus other nations

Records complete to T20I #4062. Last updated 8 August 2026.

Opponent	M	W	L	T	NR	First match	First win
vs Associate Members
Argentina	7	0	7	0	0	3 October 2019	
Bahamas	1	0	1	0	0	16 December 2024	
Belize	2	0	2	0	0	25 April 2019	
Bermuda	1	0	1	0	0	10 December 2024	
Brazil	8	5	3	0	0	5 October 2019	5 October 2019
Cayman Islands	3	0	3	0	0	11 December 2024	
Chile	2	1	1	0	0	4 October 2019	18 October 2023
Costa Rica	9	7	2	0	0	26 April 2019	26 April 2019
Panama	5	0	4	0	1	27 April 2019	
Peru	2	2	0	0	0	5 October 2019	5 October 2019
Suriname	3	2	1	0	0	12 December 2024	12 December 2024
Turks and Caicos Islands	1	1	0	0	0	18 April 2025	18 April 2025

=== Other records ===
For a list of selected international matches played by Mexico, see Cricket Archive.

== See also ==
- List of Mexico Twenty20 International cricketers
- Mexico women's national cricket team
