= Associate international cricket in 2024–25 =

International cricket season

The 2024–25 Associate international cricket season included series starting from late September 2024 to March 2025. All official 20-over matches between associate members of the ICC were eligible to have full men's Twenty20 International or women's Twenty20 International (T20I) status, as the International Cricket Council (ICC) granted T20I status to matches between all of its members from 1 July 2018 (women's teams) and 1 January 2019 (men's teams). The season included all T20I cricket series mostly involving ICC Associate members, that were played in addition to series covered in International cricket in 2024–25.

== Season overview ==
=== Men's events ===
International tours
Start date	Home team	Away team	Results [Matches]
Start date	Home team	Away team	T20I
25 September 2024	(South Korea) Indonesia	Japan	0–1 [1]
26 September 2024	(South Korea) Japan	Philippines	1–0 [1]
30 September 2024	Gibraltar	Serbia	2–0 [2]
9 October 2024	Malawi	Rwanda	2–3 [5]
17 October 2024	United States	Nepal	0–3 [3]
18 October 2024	Kenya	Seychelles	1–0 [1]
28 October 2024	Uganda	Bahrain	1–1 [2]
12 November 2024	Indonesia	Myanmar	6–0 [6]
13 November 2024	Oman	Netherlands	1–2 [3]
2 December 2024	Argentina	Bermuda	0–1 [1]
19 February 2025	Indonesia	Bahrain	1–4 [5]
20 February 2025	Oman	United States	0–3 [3]
28 February 2025	Singapore	Bahrain	0–3 [5]
10 March 2025	Costa Rica	Falkland Islands	5–1 [6]
18 March 2025	Namibia	Canada	3–0 [5]
International tournaments
Start date	Tournament		Winners
21 September 2024	(Tanzania) 2024–25 Men's T20 World Cup Africa Qualifier A		Tanzania
28 September 2024	(South Korea) 2024 Men's T20 World Cup EAP Sub-regional Qualifier B		Japan
28 September 2024	2024 Canada T20I Tri-Nation Series		Canada
29 September 2024	2024 Namibia T20I Tri-Nation Series		United Arab Emirates
10 October 2024	(Brazil) 2024 Men's South American Championship		Panama
19 October 2024	2024 Bhutan Quadrangular Series		Thailand
19 October 2024	(Kenya) 2024–25 Men's T20 World Cup Africa Qualifier B		Zimbabwe
19 November 2024	(Qatar) 2024–25 Men's T20 World Cup Asia Qualifier B		United Arab Emirates
23 November 2024	(Nigeria) 2024–25 Men's T20 World Cup Africa Qualifier C		Nigeria
4 December 2024	(Rwanda) 2024 Continent Cup T20 Africa		Uganda
6 December 2024	(Argentina) 2024 Men's T20 World Cup Americas Sub-regional Qualifier		Bermuda
13 December 2024	(United Arab Emirates) 2024 Men's Gulf T20I Championship		United Arab Emirates
3 February 2025	2025 Malta Tri-Nation Series		Hungary
10 March 2025	2025 Malaysia Tri-Nation Series		Bahrain

=== Women's events ===
International tours
Start date	Home team	Away team	Results [Matches]
Start date	Home team	Away team	WT20I
1 October 2024	Japan	Singapore	5–0 [5]
12 October 2024	Serbia	Bulgaria	4–0 [4]
26 October 2024	Greece	Bulgaria	4–0 [4]
26 October 2024	Croatia	Spain	0–4 [4]
29 October 2024	Rwanda	Kenya	3–2 [5]
16 November 2024	Mexico	Costa Rica	3–0 [3]
3 December 2024	Qatar	Bahrain	4–1 [5]
10 December 2024	Malaysia	Namibia	0–3 [3]
15 December 2024	Gibraltar	Jersey	0–2 [2]
21 December 2024	Bhutan	Myanmar	0–5 [5]
23 December 2024	Singapore	Philippines	2–1 [4]
International tournaments
Start date	Tournament		Winners
26 September 2024	(Italy) 2024 Women's Mdina Cup		Italy
26 September 2024	(Brazil) 2024 Women's South American Championship		Brazil
8 October 2024	(South Korea) 2024 Women's Twenty20 East Asia Cup		Hong Kong
21 October 2024	(Singapore) 2024 Women's Merlion Trophy		Myanmar
7 November 2024	(China) 2024 Women's Belt and Road Trophy		Hong Kong
4 December 2024	2024 Hong Kong Women's Quadrangular Series		Thailand
30 January 2025	2025 Nepal Women's Tri-Nation Series		Thailand
8 March 2025	(Uganda) 2025 Women's Day Cup		Uganda
10 March 2025	(New Caledonia) 2025 Pacific-France Women's T20I Championship		Samoa
10 March 2025	(Argentina) 2025 Women's T20 World Cup Americas Qualifier		United States

== September ==
=== 2024 Men's T20 World Cup Africa Qualifier A ===
Qualifier A standings
Pos	Team	Pld	W	L	NR	Pts	NRR	Qualification
1	Tanzania (H)	5	5	0	0	10	4.774	Advanced to the regional final
2	Malawi	5	4	1	0	8	3.241	Advanced to the regional final
3	Ghana	5	3	2	0	6	1.575	Eliminated
4	Cameroon	5	2	3	0	4	−1.191	Eliminated
5	Lesotho	5	1	4	0	2	−2.283	Eliminated
6	Mali	5	0	5	0	0	−6.637	Eliminated

Source: ESPNcricinfo
(H) Host

Round-robin
No.	Date	Team 1	Team 2	Venue	Result
T20I 2852	21 September	Lesotho	Malawi	Gymkhana Club Ground, Dar es Salaam	Malawi by 93 runs
T20I 2853	21 September	Cameroon	Ghana	Gymkhana Club Ground, Dar es Salaam	Ghana by 8 wickets
T20I 2854	21 September	Tanzania	Mali	University of Dar es Salaam Ground, Dar es Salaam	Tanzania by 10 wickets
T20I 2855	22 September	Cameroon	Mali	Gymkhana Club Ground, Dar es Salaam	Cameroon by 6 wickets
T20I 2856	22 September	Ghana	Malawi	University of Dar es Salaam Ground, Dar es Salaam	Malawi by 25 runs
T20I 2857	22 September	Tanzania	Lesotho	Gymkhana Club Ground, Dar es Salaam	Tanzania by 122 runs
T20I 2858	24 September	Ghana	Lesotho	University of Dar es Salaam Ground, Dar es Salaam	Ghana by 50 runs
T20I 2859	24 September	Cameroon	Tanzania	Gymkhana Club Ground, Dar es Salaam	Tanzania by 9 wickets
T20I 2860	24 September	Malawi	Mali	University of Dar es Salaam Ground, Dar es Salaam	Malawi by 9 wickets
T20I 2862	25 September	Tanzania	Ghana	University of Dar es Salaam Ground, Dar es Salaam	Tanzania by 7 wickets
T20I 2863	25 September	Lesotho	Mali	Gymkhana Club Ground, Dar es Salaam	Lesotho by 112 runs
T20I 2864	25 September	Cameroon	Malawi	University of Dar es Salaam Ground, Dar es Salaam	Malawi by 9 wickets
T20I 2866	26 September	Ghana	Mali	Gymkhana Club Ground, Dar es Salaam	Ghana by 10 wickets
T20I 2867	26 September	Cameroon	Lesotho	University of Dar es Salaam Ground, Dar es Salaam	Cameroon by 9 wickets
T20I 2868	26 September	Tanzania	Malawi	Gymkhana Club Ground, Dar es Salaam	Tanzania by 19 runs

=== Indonesia against Japan in South Korea ===
T20I match
No.	Date	Venue	Result
T20I 2861	25 September	Yeonhui Cricket Ground, Incheon	Japan by 4 runs

=== Japan against Philippines in South Korea ===
T20I match
No.	Date	Venue	Result
T20I 2865	26 September	Yeonhui Cricket Ground, Incheon	Japan by 47 runs

=== 2024 Women's Mdina Cup ===
Pos	Team	Pld	W	L	NR	Pts	NRR
1	Italy	4	4	0	0	8	4.662
2	Sweden	4	2	2	0	4	0.475
3	Malta	4	0	4	0	0	−5.093

Source: ESPNcricinfo

Round-robin
No.	Date	Team 1	Team 2	Venue	Result
WT20I 2039	26 September	Malta	Sweden	Roma Cricket Ground, Rome	Sweden by 75 runs
WT20I 2040	26 September	Italy	Malta	Roma Cricket Ground, Rome	Italy by 10 wickets
WT20I 2043	27 September	Italy	Sweden	Roma Cricket Ground, Rome	Italy by 84 runs
WT20I 2044	27 September	Malta	Sweden	Roma Cricket Ground, Rome	Sweden by 71 runs
WT20I 2047	28 September	Italy	Malta	Simar Cricket Ground, Rome	Italy by 140 runs
WT20I 2048	28 September	Italy	Sweden	Simar Cricket Ground, Rome	Italy by 24 runs
Play-offs
No.	Date	Team 1	Team 2	Venue	Result
WT20I 2051	29 September	Malta	Sweden	Simar Cricket Ground, Rome	Sweden by 9 wickets
WT20I 2052	29 September	Italy	Sweden	Simar Cricket Ground, Rome	Italy by 7 wickets

=== 2024 Women's South American Championship ===
Pos	Team	Pld	W	L	NR	Pts	NRR
1	Brazil	3	3	0	0	6	10.708
2	Argentina	3	2	1	0	4	4.473
3	Mexico	3	1	2	0	2	−6.426
4	Cayman Islands	3	0	3	0	0	−5.816

Source: ESPNcricinfo

Round-robin
No.	Date	Team 1	Team 2	Venue	Result
WT20I 2041	26 September	Brazil	Mexico	Pocos Oval, Poços de Caldas	Brazil by 234 runs
WT20I 2042	26 September	Argentina	Cayman Islands	Pocos Oval, Poços de Caldas	Argentina by 186 runs
WT20I 2045	27 September	Cayman Islands	Mexico	Pocos Oval, Poços de Caldas	Mexico by 1 wicket
WT20I 2046	27 September	Brazil	Argentina	Pocos Oval, Poços de Caldas	Brazil by 10 wickets
WT20I 2049	28 September	Brazil	Cayman Islands	Pocos Oval, Poços de Caldas	Brazil by 10 wickets
WT20I 2050	28 September	Argentina	Mexico	Pocos Oval, Poços de Caldas	Argentina by 9 wickets
Play-offs
No.	Date	Team 1	Team 2	Venue	Result
WT20I 2053	29 September	Cayman Islands	Mexico	Pocos Oval, Poços de Caldas	Cayman Islands by 4 runs
WT20I 2054	29 September	Brazil	Argentina	Pocos Oval, Poços de Caldas	Brazil by 21 runs (DLS)

=== 2024 Men's T20 World Cup East Asia-Pacific Qualifier B ===
Qualifier B standings
Pos	Team	Pld	W	L	NR	Pts	NRR	Qualification
1	Japan	6	6	0	0	12	3.527	Advanced to the regional final
2	Philippines	6	3	3	0	6	1.235	Eliminated
3	Indonesia	6	3	3	0	6	−1.834	Eliminated
4	South Korea (H)	6	0	6	0	0	−2.840	Eliminated

Source: ESPNcricinfo
(H) Host

Round-robin
No.	Date	Team 1	Team 2	Venue	Result
T20I 2870	28 September	Japan	Philippines	Yeonhui Cricket Ground, Incheon	Japan by 2 wickets
T20I 2871	28 September	South Korea	Indonesia	Yeonhui Cricket Ground, Incheon	Indonesia by 2 wickets
T20I 2873	29 September	Indonesia	Philippines	Yeonhui Cricket Ground, Incheon	Philippines by 42 runs
T20I 2874	29 September	South Korea	Japan	Yeonhui Cricket Ground, Incheon	Japan by 7 wickets
T20I 2882	1 October	Indonesia	Japan	Yeonhui Cricket Ground, Incheon	Japan by 53 runs
T20I 2883	1 October	South Korea	Philippines	Yeonhui Cricket Ground, Incheon	Philippines by 37 runs
T20I 2886	2 October	Japan	Philippines	Yeonhui Cricket Ground, Incheon	Japan by 27 runs
T20I 2887	2 October	South Korea	Indonesia	Yeonhui Cricket Ground, Incheon	Indonesia by 27 runs
T20I 2891	4 October	Indonesia	Philippines	Yeonhui Cricket Ground, Incheon	Indonesia by 3 runs
T20I 2892	4 October	South Korea	Japan	Yeonhui Cricket Ground, Incheon	Japan by 108 runs
T20I 2894	5 October	South Korea	Philippines	Yeonhui Cricket Ground, Incheon	Philippines by 101 runs
T20I 2895	5 October	Indonesia	Japan	Yeonhui Cricket Ground, Incheon	Japan by 144 runs

=== 2024 Canada T20I Tri-Nation Series ===
Pos	Team	Pld	W	L	NR	Pts	NRR
1	Canada	4	3	1	0	6	0.309
2	Nepal	4	2	2	0	4	0.935
3	Oman	4	1	3	0	2	−1.318

Source: ESPNcricinfo

Round-robin
No.	Date	Team 1	Team 2	Venue	Result
T20I 2872	28 September	Canada	Nepal	Maple Leaf Cricket Club, King City	Canada by 14 runs
T20I 2877	29 September	Nepal	Oman	Maple Leaf Cricket Club, King City	Nepal by 37 runs
T20I 2880	30 September	Canada	Oman	Maple Leaf Cricket Club, King City	Oman by 8 wickets
T20I 2885	1 October	Canada	Nepal	Maple Leaf Cricket Club, King City	Canada by 4 wickets
T20I 2889	2 October	Nepal	Oman	Maple Leaf Cricket Club, King City	Nepal by 56 runs
T20I 2890	3 October	Canada	Oman	Maple Leaf Cricket Club, King City	Canada by 5 wickets

=== 2024 Namibia T20I Tri-Nation Series ===
Pos	Team	Pld	W	L	NR	Pts	NRR
1	United Arab Emirates	4	3	1	0	6	1.074
2	United States	4	3	1	0	6	0.383
3	Namibia	4	0	4	0	0	−1.996

Source: ESPNcricinfo

Round-robin
No.	Date	Team 1	Team 2	Venue	Result
T20I 2875	29 September	Namibia	United Arab Emirates	Wanderers Cricket Ground, Windhoek	United Arab Emirates by 40 runs
T20I 2879	30 September	United Arab Emirates	United States	Wanderers Cricket Ground, Windhoek	United States by 15 runs
T20I 2884	1 October	Namibia	United States	Wanderers Cricket Ground, Windhoek	United States by 13 runs
T20I 2888	2 October	Namibia	United Arab Emirates	Wanderers Cricket Ground, Windhoek	United Arab Emirates by 6 wickets
T20I 2893	4 October	United Arab Emirates	United States	Wanderers Cricket Ground, Windhoek	United Arab Emirates by 6 runs
T20I 2896	5 October	Namibia	United States	Wanderers Cricket Ground, Windhoek	United States by 6 wickets

=== Serbia in Gibraltar ===
T20I series
No.	Date	Venue	Result
T20I 2878	30 September	Europa Sports Park, Gibraltar	Gibraltar by 7 wickets
T20I 2881	30 September	Europa Sports Park, Gibraltar	Gibraltar by 8 wickets

== October ==
=== Singapore women in Japan ===
WT20I series
No.	Date	Venue	Result
WT20I 2055	1 October	Sano International Cricket Ground, Sano	Japan by 9 wickets
WT20I 2056	2 October	Sano International Cricket Ground, Sano	Japan by 9 wickets
WT20I 2059	4 October	Sano International Cricket Ground, Sano	Japan by 17 runs
WT20I 2062	5 October	Sano International Cricket Ground, Sano	Japan by 42 runs
WT20I 2065	6 October	Sano International Cricket Ground, Sano	Japan by 29 runs

=== 2024 Women's Twenty20 East Asia Cup ===
Pos	Team	Pld	W	L	T	NR	Pts	NRR
1	Hong Kong	4	4	0	0	0	8	3.319
2	Japan	4	3	1	0	0	6	1.797
3	China	4	2	2	0	0	4	0.342
4	South Korea	4	1	3	0	0	2	−2.301
5	Mongolia	4	0	4	0	0	0	−3.712

Source: ESPNcricinfo

Round-robin
No.	Date	Team 1	Team 2	Venue	Result
WT20I 2069	8 October	Hong Kong	Japan	Yeonhui Cricket Ground, Incheon	Hong Kong by 44 runs
WT20I 2070	8 October	China	Mongolia	Yeonhui Cricket Ground, Incheon	China by 5 wickets
WT20I 2072	9 October	South Korea	Mongolia	Yeonhui Cricket Ground, Incheon	South Korea by 33 runs
WT20I 2073	9 October	China	Hong Kong	Yeonhui Cricket Ground, Incheon	Hong Kong by 53 runs
WT20I 2076	10 October	Hong Kong	Mongolia	Yeonhui Cricket Ground, Incheon	Hong Kong by 9 wickets
WT20I 2077	10 October	South Korea	Japan	Yeonhui Cricket Ground, Incheon	Japan by 9 wickets
WT20I 2079	11 October	South Korea	China	Yeonhui Cricket Ground, Incheon	China by 50 runs
WT20I 2080	11 October	Japan	Mongolia	Yeonhui Cricket Ground, Incheon	Japan by 89 runs
WT20I 2082	12 October	China	Japan	Yeonhui Cricket Ground, Incheon	Japan by 19 runs
WT20I 2083	12 October	South Korea	Hong Kong	Yeonhui Cricket Ground, Incheon	Hong Kong by 70 runs
Play-offs
No.	Date	Team 1	Team 2	Venue	Result
WT20I 2088	13 October	South Korea	China	Yeonhui Cricket Ground, Incheon	China by 10 wickets
WT20I 2089	13 October	Hong Kong	Japan	Yeonhui Cricket Ground, Incheon	Hong Kong by 10 wickets

=== Rwanda in Malawi ===
T20I series
No.	Date	Venue	Result
T20I 2898	9 October	TCA Oval, Blantyre	Rwanda by 8 wickets
T20I 2900	10 October	TCA Oval, Blantyre	Rwanda by 9 wickets
T20I 2901	12 October	TCA Oval, Blantyre	Malawi by 5 runs
T20I 2902	12 October	TCA Oval, Blantyre	Malawi by 6 wickets
T20I 2905	13 October	TCA Oval, Blantyre	Rwanda by 6 wickets

=== 2024 Men's South American Championship ===
Pos	Team	Pld	W	L	T	NR	Pts	NRR
1	Brazil	3	3	0	0	0	6	2.874
2	Mexico	3	1	1	0	1	3	1.926
3	Peru	3	1	1	0	1	3	−1.125
4	Colombia	3	0	3	0	0	0	−3.421

Source: ESPNcricinfo

Pos	Team	Pld	W	L	T	NR	Pts	NRR
1	Panama	3	2	0	0	1	5	4.447
2	Argentina	3	2	1	0	0	4	5.095
3	Chile	3	1	2	0	0	2	−5.868
4	Uruguay	3	0	2	0	1	1	−2.759

Source: ESPNcricinfo

Group stage
No.	Date	Team 1	Team 2	Venue	Result
1st Match	10 October	Mexico	Peru	Sao Fernando Polo and Cricket Club, Itaguaí	Match abandoned
2nd Match	10 October	Panama	Uruguay	Sao Fernando Polo and Cricket Club (Campo Sede), Itaguaí	Match abandoned
3rd Match	10 October	Argentina	Chile	Sao Fernando Polo and Cricket Club, Itaguaí	Argentina by 200 runs
4th Match	10 October	Brazil	Colombia	Sao Fernando Polo and Cricket Club (Campo Sede), Itaguaí	Brazil by 6 wickets
5th Match	11 October	Brazil	Peru	Sao Fernando Polo and Cricket Club, Itaguaí	Brazil by 89 runs
6th Match	11 October	Chile	Uruguay	Sao Fernando Polo and Cricket Club (Campo Sede), Itaguaí	Chile by 6 wickets
7th Match	11 October	Argentina	Panama	Sao Fernando Polo and Cricket Club, Itaguaí	Panama by 6 wickets
8th Match	11 October	Colombia	Mexico	Sao Fernando Polo and Cricket Club (Campo Sede), Itaguaí	Mexico by 7 wickets
T20I 2903	12 October	Brazil	Mexico	Sao Fernando Polo and Cricket Club, Itaguaí	Brazil by 7 runs
10th Match	12 October	Colombia	Peru	Sao Fernando Polo and Cricket Club (Campo Sede), Itaguaí	Peru by 44 runs
11th Match	12 October	Argentina	Uruguay	Sao Fernando Polo and Cricket Club, Itaguaí	Argentina by 6 wickets
12th Match	12 October	Chile	Panama	Sao Fernando Polo and Cricket Club (Campo Sede), Itaguaí	Panama by 159 runs
Play-offs
No.	Date	Team 1	Team 2	Venue	Result
7th place play-off	13 October	Colombia	Uruguay	Sao Fernando Polo and Cricket Club (Campo Sede), Itaguaí	Colombia by forfeit
5th place play-off	13 October	Chile	Peru	Sao Fernando Polo and Cricket Club (Campo Sede), Itaguaí	Peru by 6 wickets
T20I 2906	13 October	Argentina	Mexico	Sao Fernando Polo and Cricket Club, Itaguaí	Argentina by 8 wickets
Final	13 October	Brazil	Panama	Sao Fernando Polo and Cricket Club, Itaguaí	Panama by 26 runs

=== Bulgaria women in Serbia ===
Balkan Cup – WT20I series
No.	Date	Venue	Result
WT20I 2084	12 October	Lisicji Jarak Cricket Ground, Belgrade	Serbia by 99 runs
WT20I 2086	12 October	Lisicji Jarak Cricket Ground, Belgrade	Serbia by 138 runs
WT20I 2090	13 October	Lisicji Jarak Cricket Ground, Belgrade	Serbia by 5 wickets
WT20I 2092	13 October	Lisicji Jarak Cricket Ground, Belgrade	Serbia by 9 wickets

=== Nepal in United States ===
T20I series
No.	Date	Venue	Result
T20I 2910	17 October	Grand Prairie Stadium, Dallas	Nepal by 17 runs
T20I 2916	19 October	Grand Prairie Stadium, Dallas	Match tied (Nepal won S/O)
T20I 2921	20 October	Grand Prairie Stadium, Dallas	Nepal by 8 wickets

=== Seychelles in Kenya ===
T20I series
No.	Date	Venue	Result
T20I 2911	18 October	Sikh Union Club Ground, Nairobi	Kenya by 91 runs

=== 2024 Bhutan Quadrangular Series ===
Pos	Team	Pld	W	L	T	NR	Pts	NRR
1	Thailand	3	3	0	0	0	6	2.868
2	Bhutan	3	2	1	0	0	4	−0.132
3	Maldives	3	1	2	0	0	2	−0.668
4	Indonesia	3	0	3	0	0	0	−2.379

Source: ESPNcricinfo

Round-robin
No.	Date	Team 1	Team 2	Venue	Result
T20I 2912	19 October	Bhutan	Thailand	Gelephu International Cricket Ground, Gelephu	Thailand by 77 runs
T20I 2913	19 October	Indonesia	Maldives	Gelephu International Cricket Ground, Gelephu	Maldives by 23 runs (DLS)
T20I 2917	20 October	Bhutan	Maldives	Gelephu International Cricket Ground, Gelephu	Bhutan by 4 wickets
T20I 2919	20 October	Indonesia	Thailand	Gelephu International Cricket Ground, Gelephu	Thailand by 6 wickets
T20I 2922	22 October	Maldives	Thailand	Gelephu International Cricket Ground, Gelephu	Thailand by 44 runs
T20I 2924	22 October	Bhutan	Indonesia	Gelephu International Cricket Ground, Gelephu	Bhutan by 56 runs
Play-offs
No.	Date	Team 1	Team 2	Venue	Result
T20I 2927	23 October	Indonesia	Thailand	Gelephu International Cricket Ground, Gelephu	Thailand by 66 runs
T20I 2929	23 October	Bhutan	Maldives	Gelephu International Cricket Ground, Gelephu	Maldives by 7 wickets
T20I 2932	24 October	Bhutan	Indonesia	Gelephu International Cricket Ground, Gelephu	Bhutan by 1 wicket
T20I 2935a	25 October	Maldives	Thailand	Gelephu International Cricket Ground, Gelephu	Match abandoned

=== 2024 Men's T20 World Cup Africa Qualifier B ===
Qualifier B standings
Pos	Team	Pld	W	L	NR	Pts	NRR	Qualification
1	Zimbabwe	5	5	0	0	10	8.893	Advanced to the regional final
2	Kenya (H)	5	4	1	0	8	3.108	Advanced to the regional final
3	Mozambique	5	3	2	0	6	−1.259	Eliminated
4	Rwanda	5	2	3	0	4	−1.853	Eliminated
5	Seychelles	5	1	4	0	2	−4.425	Eliminated
6	Gambia	5	0	5	0	0	−7.219	Eliminated

Source: ESPNcricinfo
(H) Host

Round-robin
No.	Date	Team 1	Team 2	Venue	Result
T20I 2912a	19 October	Gambia	Rwanda	Gymkhana Club Ground, Nairobi	Rwanda by walkover
T20I 2914	19 October	Seychelles	Zimbabwe	Gymkhana Club Ground, Nairobi	Zimbabwe by 76 runs (DLS)
T20I 2915	19 October	Kenya	Mozambique	Ruaraka Sports Club Ground, Nairobi	Kenya by 111 runs (DLS)
T20I 2918	20 October	Mozambique	Zimbabwe	Gymkhana Club Ground, Nairobi	Zimbabwe by 9 wickets
T20I 2918a	20 October	Gambia	Seychelles	Ruaraka Sports Club Ground, Nairobi	Seychelles by walkover
T20I 2920	20 October	Kenya	Rwanda	Gymkhana Club Ground, Nairobi	Kenya by 5 wickets
T20I 2923	22 October	Mozambique	Seychelles	Gymkhana Club Ground, Nairobi	Mozambique by 60 runs
T20I 2925	22 October	Kenya	Gambia	Gymkhana Club Ground, Nairobi	Kenya by 129 runs
T20I 2926	22 October	Rwanda	Zimbabwe	Ruaraka Sports Club Ground, Nairobi	Zimbabwe by 149 runs
T20I 2928	23 October	Kenya	Seychelles	Ruaraka Sports Club Ground, Nairobi	Kenya by 9 wickets
T20I 2930	23 October	Mozambique	Rwanda	Gymkhana Club Ground, Nairobi	Mozambique by 7 wickets
T20I 2931	23 October	Gambia	Zimbabwe	Ruaraka Sports Club Ground, Nairobi	Zimbabwe by 290 runs
T20I 2933	24 October	Rwanda	Seychelles	Ruaraka Sports Club Ground, Nairobi	Rwanda by 73 runs
T20I 2934	24 October	Kenya	Zimbabwe	Gymkhana Club Ground, Nairobi	Zimbabwe by 61 runs
T20I 2935	24 October	Gambia	Mozambique	Ruaraka Sports Club Ground, Nairobi	Mozambique by 6 wickets

=== 2024 Women's Merlion Trophy ===
Pos	Team	Pld	W	L	T	NR	Pts	NRR
1	Kuwait	6	5	1	0	0	10	1.070
2	Myanmar	6	4	2	0	0	8	0.583
3	Singapore	6	0	6	0	0	0	−1.728

Source: ESPNcricinfo

Round-robin
No.	Date	Team 1	Team 2	Venue	Result
WT20I 2099	21 October	Singapore	Myanmar	SNCG Singa Oval, Singapore	Myanmar by 7 wickets
WT20I 2100	22 October	Kuwait	Myanmar	SNCG Singa Oval, Singapore	Kuwait by 27 runs
WT20I 2101	23 October	Singapore	Kuwait	SNCG Singa Oval, Singapore	Kuwait by 5 wickets
WT20I 2102	24 October	Singapore	Myanmar	SNCG Singa Oval, Singapore	Myanmar by 5 wickets
WT20I 2103	25 October	Kuwait	Myanmar	SNCG Singa Oval, Singapore	Myanmar by 11 runs
WT20I 2104	26 October	Singapore	Kuwait	SNCG Singa Oval, Singapore	Kuwait by 1 wicket
WT20I 2109	27 October	Singapore	Myanmar	SNCG Singa Oval, Singapore	Myanmar by 65 runs
WT20I 2114	28 October	Kuwait	Myanmar	SNCG Singa Oval, Singapore	Kuwait by 20 runs
WT20I 2115	29 October	Singapore	Kuwait	SNCG Singa Oval, Singapore	Kuwait by 6 wickets
Final
No.	Date	Team 1	Team 2	Venue	Result
WT20I 2117	30 October	Kuwait	Myanmar	SNCG Singa Oval, Singapore	Myanmar by 5 wickets

=== Bulgaria women in Greece ===
WT20I series
No.	Date	Venue	Result
WT20I 2105	26 October	Marina Ground, Gouvia	Greece by 10 wickets
WT20I 2107	26 October	Marina Ground, Gouvia	Greece by 10 wickets
WT20I 2111	27 October	Marina Ground, Gouvia	Greece by 82 runs
WT20I 2113	27 October	Marina Ground, Gouvia	Greece by 138 runs

=== Spain women in Croatia ===
Mediterranean Cup – WT20I series
No.	Date	Venue	Result
WT20I 2106	26 October	Mladost Cricket Ground, Zagreb	Spain by 9 wickets
WT20I 2108	26 October	Mladost Cricket Ground, Zagreb	Spain by 109 runs
WT20I 2110	27 October	Mladost Cricket Ground, Zagreb	Spain by 8 wickets
WT20I 2112	27 October	Mladost Cricket Ground, Zagreb	Spain by 95 runs

=== Bahrain in Uganda ===
T20I series
No.	Date	Venue	Result
T20I 2936	28 October	Jinja Cricket Ground, Jinja	Bahrain by 17 runs
T20I 2937	29 October	Jinja Cricket Ground, Jinja	Uganda by 8 wickets

=== Kenya women in Rwanda ===
WT20I series
No.	Date	Venue	Result
WT20I 2116	29 October	Gahanga B Ground, Kigali	Rwanda by 40 runs
WT20I 2118	30 October	Gahanga B Ground, Kigali	Kenya by 22 runs
WT20I 2119	31 October	Gahanga B Ground, Kigali	Rwanda by 28 runs
WT20I 2120	2 November	Gahanga B Ground, Kigali	Kenya by 4 runs
WT20I 2121	2 November	Gahanga B Ground, Kigali	Rwanda by 5 wickets (DLS)

== November ==
=== 2024 Women's Belt and Road Trophy ===
Pos	Team	Pld	W	L	T	NR	Pts	NRR
1	Hong Kong	3	2	1	0	0	4	1.475
2	China	3	2	1	0	0	4	1.317
3	Myanmar	3	2	1	0	0	4	1.129
4	Mongolia	3	0	3	0	0	0	−5.647

Source: ESPNcricinfo

Round-robin
No.	Date	Team 1	Team 2	Venue	Result
WT20I 2122	7 November	Hong Kong	Myanmar	ZJUT Cricket Field, Hangzhou	Myanmar by 2 runs
WT20I 2123	7 November	China	Mongolia	ZJUT Cricket Field, Hangzhou	China by 8 wickets
WT20I 2124	8 November	Mongolia	Myanmar	ZJUT Cricket Field, Hangzhou	Myanmar by 78 runs
WT20I 2125	8 November	China	Hong Kong	ZJUT Cricket Field, Hangzhou	Hong Kong by 3 wickets
WT20I 2126	9 November	China	Myanmar	ZJUT Cricket Field, Hangzhou	China by 2 wickets
WT20I 2127	9 November	Hong Kong	Mongolia	ZJUT Cricket Field, Hangzhou	Hong Kong by 9 wickets
Play-offs
No.	Date	Team 1	Team 2	Venue	Result
WT20I 2128	10 November	Mongolia	Myanmar	ZJUT Cricket Field, Hangzhou	Myanmar by 7 wickets
WT20I 2129	10 November	China	Hong Kong	ZJUT Cricket Field, Hangzhou	Hong Kong by 8 wickets

=== Myanmar in Indonesia ===
Bali Bash – T20I series
No.	Date	Venue	Result
T20I 2944	12 November	Udayana Cricket Ground, Jimbaran	Indonesia by 136 runs
T20I 2945	13 November	Udayana Cricket Ground, Jimbaran	Indonesia by 9 wickets
T20I 2951	15 November	Udayana Cricket Ground, Jimbaran	Indonesia by 5 wickets
T20I 2953	16 November	Udayana Cricket Ground, Jimbaran	Indonesia by 4 wickets
T20I 2957	17 November	Udayana Cricket Ground, Jimbaran	Indonesia by 114 runs
T20I 2960	19 November	Udayana Cricket Ground, Jimbaran	Indonesia by 4 wickets

=== Netherlands in Oman ===
T20I series
No.	Date	Venue	Result
T20I 2946	13 November	Oman Cricket Academy Ground Turf 1, Al Amarat	Oman by 3 wickets
T20I 2949	14 November	Oman Cricket Academy Ground Turf 1, Al Amarat	Netherlands by 50 runs
T20I 2955	16 November	Oman Cricket Academy Ground Turf 1, Al Amarat	Netherlands by 29 runs

=== Costa Rica women in Mexico ===
Women's Central American Championship – WT20I series
No.	Date	Venue	Result
WT20I 2130	16 November	Reforma Athletic Club, Naucalpan	Mexico by 6 wickets
WT20I 2131	16 November	Reforma Athletic Club, Naucalpan	Mexico by 2 wickets
WT20I 2132	17 November	Las Caballerizas, Mexico City	Match tied (Mexico won S/O)

=== 2024 Men's T20 World Cup Asia Qualifier B ===
Qualifier B standings
Pos	Team	Pld	W	L	NR	Pts	NRR	Qualification
1	United Arab Emirates	6	6	0	0	12	2.541	Advanced to the regional final
2	Qatar (H)	6	5	1	0	10	0.876	Advanced to the regional final
3	Bahrain	6	3	3	0	6	0.958	Eliminated
4	Saudi Arabia	6	3	3	0	6	0.869	Eliminated
5	Thailand	6	3	3	0	6	−1.330	Eliminated
6	Cambodia	6	1	5	0	2	−1.467	Eliminated
7	Bhutan	6	0	6	0	0	−2.367	Eliminated

Source: ESPNcricinfo
(H) Host

Round-robin
No.	Date	Team 1	Team 2	Venue	Result
T20I 2961	19 November	Qatar	Thailand	West End Park International Cricket Stadium, Doha	Qatar by 5 wickets
T20I 2962	19 November	Bhutan	United Arab Emirates	UDST Cricket Ground, Doha	United Arab Emirates by 63 runs
T20I 2963	19 November	Bahrain	Saudi Arabia	West End Park International Cricket Stadium, Doha	Bahrain by 3 runs
T20I 2964	20 November	Cambodia	Thailand	West End Park International Cricket Stadium, Doha	Thailand by 16 runs
T20I 2965	20 November	Qatar	Bhutan	UDST Cricket Ground, Doha	Qatar by 6 wickets
T20I 2966	20 November	Saudi Arabia	United Arab Emirates	West End Park International Cricket Stadium, Doha	United Arab Emirates by 17 runs
T20I 2967	22 November	Cambodia	United Arab Emirates	West End Park International Cricket Stadium, Doha	United Arab Emirates by 5 wickets
T20I 2968	22 November	Bahrain	Thailand	UDST Cricket Ground, Doha	Thailand by 2 wickets
T20I 2969	22 November	Bhutan	Saudi Arabia	UDST Cricket Ground, Doha	Saudi Arabia by 85 runs
T20I 2970	23 November	Bahrain	Bhutan	West End Park International Cricket Stadium, Doha	Bahrain by 90 runs
T20I 2971	23 November	Thailand	United Arab Emirates	UDST Cricket Ground, Doha	United Arab Emirates by 155 runs
T20I 2973	23 November	Qatar	Cambodia	UDST Cricket Ground, Doha	Qatar by 48 runs
T20I 2979	25 November	Qatar	Bahrain	West End Park International Cricket Stadium, Doha	Qatar by 15 runs
T20I 2980	25 November	Cambodia	Saudi Arabia	UDST Cricket Ground, Doha	Saudi Arabia by 5 wickets
T20I 2981	25 November	Bhutan	Thailand	West End Park International Cricket Stadium, Doha	Thailand by 7 runs
T20I 2982	26 November	Saudi Arabia	Thailand	West End Park International Cricket Stadium, Doha	Saudi Arabia by 5 wickets
T20I 2983	26 November	Bahrain	Cambodia	UDST Cricket Ground, Doha	Bahrain by 49 runs
T20I 2985	26 November	Qatar	United Arab Emirates	West End Park International Cricket Stadium, Doha	United Arab Emirates by 29 runs
T20I 2991	28 November	Bhutan	Cambodia	West End Park International Cricket Stadium, Doha	Cambodia by 5 wickets
T20I 2992	28 November	Qatar	Saudi Arabia	UDST Cricket Ground, Doha	Qatar by 6 wickets
T20I 2994	28 November	Bahrain	United Arab Emirates	UDST Cricket Ground, Doha	United Arab Emirates by 8 wickets

=== 2024 Men's T20 World Cup Africa Qualifier C ===
Qualifier C standings
Pos	Team	Pld	W	L	NR	Pts	NRR	Qualification
1	Nigeria (H)	5	5	0	0	10	5.372	Advanced to the regional final
2	Botswana	5	4	1	0	8	1.796	Advanced to the regional final
3	Sierra Leone	5	3	2	0	6	2.474	Eliminated
4	Eswatini	5	2	3	0	4	−0.337	Eliminated
5	Saint Helena	5	1	4	0	2	−1.369	Eliminated
6	Ivory Coast	5	0	5	0	0	−10.698	Eliminated

Source: ESPNcricinfo
(H) Host

Round-robin
No.	Date	Team 1	Team 2	Venue	Result
T20I 2972	23 November	Botswana	Eswatini	Nigeria Cricket Federation Oval 1, Abuja	Botswana by 48 runs
T20I 2974	23 November	Ivory Coast	Sierra Leone	Nigeria Cricket Federation Oval 1, Abuja	Sierra Leone by 168 runs
T20I 2975	23 November	Nigeria	Saint Helena	Nigeria Cricket Federation Oval 2, Abuja	Nigeria by 118 runs
T20I 2976	24 November	Botswana	Sierra Leone	Nigeria Cricket Federation Oval 2, Abuja	Botswana by 5 wickets
T20I 2977	24 November	Nigeria	Ivory Coast	Nigeria Cricket Federation Oval 1, Abuja	Nigeria by 264 runs
T20I 2978	24 November	Eswatini	Saint Helena	Nigeria Cricket Federation Oval 2, Abuja	Eswatini by 48 runs
T20I 2984	26 November	Saint Helena	Sierra Leone	Nigeria Cricket Federation Oval 1, Abuja	Sierra Leone by 4 wickets
T20I 2986	26 November	Nigeria	Eswatini	Nigeria Cricket Federation Oval 1, Abuja	Nigeria by 5 wickets
T20I 2987	26 November	Botswana	Ivory Coast	Nigeria Cricket Federation Oval 2, Abuja	Botswana by 10 wickets
T20I 2988	27 November	Nigeria	Sierra Leone	Nigeria Cricket Federation Oval 1, Abuja	Nigeria by 29 runs
T20I 2989	27 November	Botswana	Saint Helena	Nigeria Cricket Federation Oval 1, Abuja	Botswana by 9 wickets
T20I 2990	27 November	Eswatini	Ivory Coast	Nigeria Cricket Federation Oval 2, Abuja	Eswatini by 8 wickets
T20I 2993	28 November	Ivory Coast	Saint Helena	Nigeria Cricket Federation Oval 1, Abuja	Saint Helena by 10 wickets
T20I 2995	28 November	Eswatini	Sierra Leone	Nigeria Cricket Federation Oval 2, Abuja	Sierra Leone by 109 runs
T20I 2996	28 November	Nigeria	Botswana	Nigeria Cricket Federation Oval 1, Abuja	Nigeria by 77 runs

== December ==
=== Bermuda in Argentina ===
T20I match
No.	Date	Venue	Result
T20I 2998	2 December	Hurlingham Club Ground, Buenos Aires	Bermuda by 42 runs

=== Bahrain women in Qatar ===
WT20I series
No.	Date	Venue	Result
WT20I 2136	3 December	West End Park International Cricket Stadium, Doha	Qatar by 12 runs
WT20I 2139	4 December	West End Park International Cricket Stadium, Doha	Qatar by 8 wickets
WT20I 2143	6 December	West End Park International Cricket Stadium, Doha	Bahrain by 19 runs
WT20I 2147	7 December	West End Park International Cricket Stadium, Doha	Qatar by 9 wickets
WT20I 2150	8 December	West End Park International Cricket Stadium, Doha	Qatar by 4 wickets

=== 2024 Hong Kong Women's Quadrangular Series ===
Pos	Team	Pld	W	L	T	NR	Pts	NRR
1	Thailand	3	3	0	0	0	6	3.184
2	Namibia	3	2	1	0	0	4	1.310
3	Hong Kong	3	1	2	0	0	2	0.607
4	China	3	0	3	0	0	0	−5.725

Source: ESPNcricinfo

Round-robin
No.	Date	Team 1	Team 2	Venue	Result
WT20I 2137	4 December	Namibia	Thailand	Mission Road Ground, Mong Kok	Thailand by 6 wickets
WT20I 2138	4 December	Hong Kong	China	Mission Road Ground, Mong Kok	Hong Kong by 108 runs
WT20I 2140	5 December	China	Namibia	Mission Road Ground, Mong Kok	Namibia by 10 wickets
WT20I 2141	5 December	Hong Kong	Thailand	Mission Road Ground, Mong Kok	Thailand by 69 runs
WT20I 2144	7 December	China	Thailand	Mission Road Ground, Mong Kok	Thailand by 109 runs
WT20I 2145	7 December	Hong Kong	Namibia	Mission Road Ground, Mong Kok	Namibia by 4 wickets
Play-offs
No.	Date	Team 1	Team 2	Venue	Result
WT20I 2148	8 December	Hong Kong	China	Mission Road Ground, Mong Kok	Hong Kong by 32 runs
WT20I 2149	8 December	Namibia	Thailand	Mission Road Ground, Mong Kok	Thailand by 30 runs

=== 2024 Continent Cup T20 Africa ===
Pos	Team	Pld	W	L	T	NR	Pts	NRR
1	Uganda	9	9	0	0	0	18	3.362
2	Nigeria	9	4	5	0	0	8	−0.109
3	Rwanda	9	3	6	0	0	6	−1.566
4	Botswana	9	2	7	0	0	4	−1.779

Source: ESPNcricinfo

Round-robin
No.	Date	Team 1	Team 2	Venue	Result
T20I 3000	4 December	Botswana	Uganda	Gahanga International Cricket Stadium, Kigali	Uganda by 78 runs
T20I 3001	4 December	Rwanda	Nigeria	Gahanga International Cricket Stadium, Kigali	Nigeria by 6 wickets (DLS)
T20I 3002	5 December	Botswana	Nigeria	Gahanga International Cricket Stadium, Kigali	Nigeria by 29 runs
T20I 3003	5 December	Rwanda	Uganda	Gahanga International Cricket Stadium, Kigali	Uganda by 112 runs (DLS)
T20I 3005	6 December	Rwanda	Botswana	Gahanga International Cricket Stadium, Kigali	Rwanda by 10 wickets
T20I 3006	6 December	Nigeria	Uganda	Gahanga International Cricket Stadium, Kigali	Uganda by 5 wickets (DLS)
T20I 3010	7 December	Rwanda	Uganda	Gahanga International Cricket Stadium, Kigali	Uganda by 86 runs
T20I 3011	7 December	Botswana	Nigeria	Gahanga International Cricket Stadium, Kigali	Botswana by 3 wickets
T20I 3016	8 December	Nigeria	Uganda	Gahanga International Cricket Stadium, Kigali	Uganda by 7 wickets
T20I 3017	8 December	Rwanda	Botswana	Gahanga International Cricket Stadium, Kigali	Botswana by 6 wickets
T20I 3022	9 December	Botswana	Uganda	Gahanga International Cricket Stadium, Kigali	Uganda by 108 runs
T20I 3023	9 December	Rwanda	Nigeria	Gahanga International Cricket Stadium, Kigali	Rwanda by 6 wickets
T20I 3029	11 December	Rwanda	Botswana	Gahanga International Cricket Stadium, Kigali	Rwanda by 25 runs
T20I 3030	11 December	Nigeria	Uganda	Gahanga International Cricket Stadium, Kigali	Uganda by 23 runs
T20I 3036	12 December	Rwanda	Uganda	Gahanga International Cricket Stadium, Kigali	Uganda by 50 runs
T20I 3037	12 December	Botswana	Nigeria	Gahanga International Cricket Stadium, Kigali	Nigeria by 10 wickets
T20I 3043	13 December	Rwanda	Nigeria	Gahanga International Cricket Stadium, Kigali	Nigeria by 37 runs
T20I 3045	13 December	Botswana	Uganda	Gahanga International Cricket Stadium, Kigali	Uganda by 32 runs
Final
No.	Date	Team 1	Team 2	Venue	Result
T20I 3050	14 December	Nigeria	Uganda	Gahanga International Cricket Stadium, Kigali	Uganda by 6 wickets

=== 2024 Men's T20 World Cup Americas Sub-regional Qualifier ===
Qualifier standings
Pos	Team	Pld	W	L	NR	Pts	NRR	Qualification
1	Bermuda	8	7	0	1	15	3.601	Advanced to the regional final
2	Cayman Islands	8	6	2	0	12	2.089	Advanced to the regional final
3	Bahamas	8	6	2	0	12	0.258	Advanced to the regional final
4	Argentina (H)	8	5	2	1	11	0.266	Eliminated
5	Belize	8	3	5	0	6	−0.551	Eliminated
6	Mexico	8	2	6	0	4	−0.326	Eliminated
7	Panama	8	2	6	0	4	−1.304	Eliminated
8	Suriname	8	2	6	0	4	−1.309	Eliminated
9	Brazil	8	2	6	0	4	−2.213	Eliminated

Source: ESPNcricinfo
(H) Host

Round-robin
No.	Date	Team 1	Team 2	Venue	Result
T20I 3006a	6 December	Argentina	Bermuda	St. George's College, Quilmes	Match abandoned
T20I 3007	6 December	Panama	Suriname	Club San Albano, Burzaco	Panama by 10 runs
T20I 3008	6 December	Bahamas	Brazil	St. George's College, Quilmes	Bahamas by 26 runs
T20I 3009	6 December	Belize	Mexico	Club San Albano, Burzaco	Belize by 5 wickets
T20I 3012	7 December	Brazil	Mexico	Hurlingham Club Ground, Buenos Aires	Mexico by 47 runs
T20I 3013	7 December	Argentina	Belize	St. George's College, Quilmes	Argentina by 5 runs
T20I 3014	7 December	Bermuda	Suriname	Hurlingham Club Ground, Buenos Aires	Bermuda by 92 runs
T20I 3015	7 December	Cayman Islands	Panama	St. George's College, Quilmes	Cayman Islands by 83 runs
T20I 3018	8 December	Bermuda	Panama	Club San Albano, Burzaco	Bermuda by 9 wickets
T20I 3019	8 December	Argentina	Bahamas	Hurlingham Club Ground, Buenos Aires	Bahamas by 18 runs
T20I 3020	8 December	Brazil	Suriname	Club San Albano, Burzaco	Brazil by 6 wickets
T20I 3021	8 December	Belize	Cayman Islands	Hurlingham Club Ground, Buenos Aires	Cayman Islands by 44 runs
T20I 3024	10 December	Cayman Islands	Suriname	Hurlingham Club Ground, Buenos Aires	Suriname by 6 wickets
T20I 3025	10 December	Bahamas	Belize	Club San Albano, Burzaco	Bahamas by 3 runs
T20I 3027	10 December	Bermuda	Mexico	Hurlingham Club Ground, Buenos Aires	Bermuda by 6 wickets
T20I 3028	10 December	Argentina	Panama	Club San Albano, Burzaco	Argentina by 6 wickets
T20I 3032	11 December	Cayman Islands	Mexico	St. George's College, Quilmes	Cayman Islands by 7 wickets
T20I 3033	11 December	Bahamas	Panama	Hurlingham Club Ground, Buenos Aires	Bahamas by 21 runs
T20I 3034	11 December	Bermuda	Brazil	St. George's College, Quilmes	Bermuda by 87 runs
T20I 3035	11 December	Argentina	Suriname	Hurlingham Club Ground, Buenos Aires	Argentina by 6 wickets
T20I 3038	12 December	Brazil	Panama	Estadio Belgrano Athletic, Buenos Aires	Brazil by 6 wickets
T20I 3039	12 December	Mexico	Suriname	St. George's College, Quilmes	Mexico by 8 wickets
T20I 3040	12 December	Bahamas	Cayman Islands	Estadio Belgrano Athletic, Buenos Aires	Cayman Islands by 10 wickets
T20I 3041	12 December	Belize	Bermuda	St. George's College, Quilmes	Bermuda by 71 runs
T20I 3052	14 December	Brazil	Cayman Islands	Club San Albano, Burzaco	Cayman Islands by 159 runs
T20I 3053	14 December	Bahamas	Suriname	Estadio Belgrano Athletic, Buenos Aires	Bahamas by 26 runs
T20I 3054	14 December	Belize	Panama	Club San Albano, Burzaco	Belize by 7 wickets
T20I 3055	14 December	Argentina	Mexico	Estadio Belgrano Athletic, Buenos Aires	Argentina by 23 runs
T20I 3058	15 December	Belize	Brazil	Estadio Belgrano Athletic, Buenos Aires	Belize by 6 wickets
T20I 3059	15 December	Argentina	Cayman Islands	Hurlingham Club Ground, Buenos Aires	Cayman Islands by 22 runs
T20I 3060	15 December	Bahamas	Bermuda	Estadio Belgrano Athletic, Buenos Aires	Bermuda by 62 runs
T20I 3061	15 December	Mexico	Panama	Hurlingham Club Ground, Buenos Aires	Panama by 48 runs
T20I 3065	16 December	Bermuda	Cayman Islands	Club San Albano, Burzaco	Bermuda by 13 runs
T20I 3066	16 December	Bahamas	Mexico	St. George's College, Quilmes	Bahamas by 24 runs
T20I 3067	16 December	Belize	Suriname	Club San Albano, Burzaco	Suriname by 4 wickets
T20I 3068	16 December	Argentina	Brazil	St. George's College, Quilmes	Argentina by 11 runs

=== Namibia women in Malaysia ===
WT20I series
No.	Date	Venue	Result
WT20I 2152	10 December	Selangor Turf Club, Kuala Lumpur	Namibia by 6 wickets
WT20I 2153	11 December	Selangor Turf Club, Kuala Lumpur	Namibia by 27 runs
WT20I 2154	12 December	Selangor Turf Club, Kuala Lumpur	Namibia by 6 wickets

=== 2024 Men's Gulf T20I Championship ===
Pos	Team	Pld	W	L	T	NR	Pts	NRR
1	United Arab Emirates	5	4	1	0	0	8	0.763
2	Kuwait	5	3	2	0	0	6	0.525
3	Saudi Arabia	5	3	2	0	0	6	−0.166
4	Oman	5	2	3	0	0	4	−0.019
5	Bahrain	5	2	3	0	0	4	−0.098
6	Qatar	5	1	4	0	0	2	−1.039

Source: ESPNcricinfo

Round-robin
No.	Date	Team 1	Team 2	Venue	Result
T20I 3042	13 December	United Arab Emirates	Bahrain	ICC Academy Ground, Dubai	United Arab Emirates by 8 wickets
T20I 3044	13 December	Kuwait	Saudi Arabia	ICC Academy Ground, Dubai	Kuwait by 6 wickets
T20I 3048	14 December	Bahrain	Kuwait	ICC Academy Ground, Dubai	Bahrain by 4 runs
T20I 3049	14 December	Oman	Qatar	ICC Academy Ground, Dubai	Oman by 35 runs
T20I 3056	15 December	United Arab Emirates	Oman	ICC Academy Ground, Dubai	United Arab Emirates by 24 runs
T20I 3057	15 December	Qatar	Saudi Arabia	ICC Academy Ground, Dubai	Saudi Arabia by 9 wickets
T20I 3063	16 December	Bahrain	Saudi Arabia	ICC Academy Ground, Dubai	Bahrain by 8 wickets
T20I 3064	16 December	United Arab Emirates	Kuwait	ICC Academy Ground, Dubai	United Arab Emirates by 11 runs
T20I 3069	17 December	Kuwait	Qatar	ICC Academy Ground, Dubai	Kuwait by 6 wickets
T20I 3070	17 December	Bahrain	Oman	ICC Academy Ground, Dubai	Oman by 2 runs
T20I 3072	18 December	Oman	Saudi Arabia	ICC Academy Ground, Dubai	Saudi Arabia by 8 wickets
T20I 3073	18 December	United Arab Emirates	Qatar	ICC Academy Ground, Dubai	United Arab Emirates by 23 runs
T20I 3074	19 December	United Arab Emirates	Saudi Arabia	ICC Academy Ground, Dubai	Saudi Arabia by 11 runs
T20I 3076	20 December	Bahrain	Qatar	ICC Academy Ground, Dubai	Qatar by 6 wickets
T20I 3077	20 December	Kuwait	Oman	ICC Academy Ground, Dubai	Kuwait by 3 wickets
Final
No.	Date	Team 1	Team 2	Venue	Result
T20I 3078	21 December	United Arab Emirates	Kuwait	Dubai International Cricket Stadium, Dubai	United Arab Emirates by 2 runs

=== Jersey women in Gibraltar ===
WT20I series
No.	Date	Venue	Result
WT20I 2155	15 December	Europa Sports Park, Gibraltar	Jersey by 8 wickets
WT20I 2157	16 December	Europa Sports Park, Gibraltar	Jersey by 9 wickets

=== Myanmar women in Bhutan ===
WT20I series
No.	Date	Venue	Result
WT20I 2160	21 December	Gelephu International Cricket Ground, Gelephu	Myanmar by 2 wickets
WT20I 2161	22 December	Gelephu International Cricket Ground, Gelephu	Myanmar by 3 wickets
WT20I 2164	24 December	Gelephu International Cricket Ground, Gelephu	Myanmar by 25 runs
WT20I 2166	26 December	Gelephu International Cricket Ground, Gelephu	Myanmar by 6 wickets
WT20I 2168	27 December	Gelephu International Cricket Ground, Gelephu	Myanmar by 5 wickets

=== Philippines women in Singapore ===
WT20I series
No.	Date	Venue	Result
WT20I 2162	23 December	Singapore National Cricket Ground, Singapore	No result
WT20I 2163	24 December	Singapore National Cricket Ground, Singapore	Singapore by 8 runs
WT20I 2165	26 December	Singapore National Cricket Ground, Singapore	Singapore by 4 wickets
WT20I 2167	27 December	Singapore National Cricket Ground, Singapore	Philippines by 7 wickets

== January ==
=== 2025 Nepal Women's Tri-Nation Series ===
Pos	Team	Pld	W	L	T	NR	Pts	NRR
1	Thailand	6	5	1	0	0	10	0.484
2	Netherlands	6	4	2	0	0	8	0.098
3	Nepal	6	0	6	0	0	0	−0.630

Source: ESPNcricinfo

Round-robin
No.	Date	Team 1	Team 2	Venue	Result
WT20I 2174	30 January	Nepal	Netherlands	Tribhuvan University International Cricket Ground, Kirtipur	Netherlands by 20 runs
WT20I 2175	31 January	Netherlands	Thailand	Tribhuvan University International Cricket Ground, Kirtipur	Thailand by 8 wickets
WT20I 2177	1 February	Nepal	Thailand	Tribhuvan University International Cricket Ground, Kirtipur	Thailand by 4 wickets
WT20I 2178	2 February	Nepal	Netherlands	Tribhuvan University International Cricket Ground, Kirtipur	Netherlands by 15 runs
WT20I 2179	3 February	Netherlands	Thailand	Tribhuvan University International Cricket Ground, Kirtipur	Thailand by 17 runs
WT20I 2180	4 February	Nepal	Thailand	Tribhuvan University International Cricket Ground, Kirtipur	Thailand by 5 runs
WT20I 2181	5 February	Nepal	Netherlands	Tribhuvan University International Cricket Ground, Kirtipur	Netherlands by 10 wickets
WT20I 2182	6 February	Netherlands	Thailand	Tribhuvan University International Cricket Ground, Kirtipur	Netherlands by 1 wicket
WT20I 2183	7 February	Nepal	Thailand	Tribhuvan University International Cricket Ground, Kirtipur	Thailand by 7 wickets

== February ==
=== 2025 Malta Tri-Nation Series ===
Pos	Team	Pld	W	L	T	NR	Pts	NRR
1	Hungary	4	3	1	0	0	6	1.111
2	Austria	4	3	1	0	0	6	0.881
3	Malta	4	0	4	0	0	0	−2.561

Source: ESPNcricinfo

Round-robin
No.	Date	Team 1	Team 2	Venue	Result
T20I 3087	3 February	Malta	Hungary	Marsa Sports Club, Marsa	Hungary by 8 runs (DLS)
T20I 3088	3 February	Malta	Austria	Marsa Sports Club, Marsa	Austria by 6 wickets
T20I 3089	4 February	Austria	Hungary	Marsa Sports Club, Marsa	Austria by 6 wickets
T20I 3090	4 February	Malta	Hungary	Marsa Sports Club, Marsa	Hungary by 8 wickets
T20I 3091	5 February	Malta	Austria	Marsa Sports Club, Marsa	Austria by 6 wickets
T20I 3092	5 February	Austria	Hungary	Marsa Sports Club, Marsa	Hungary by 2 wickets

=== Bahrain in Indonesia ===
T20I series
No.	Date	Venue	Result
T20I 3093	19 February	Udayana Cricket Ground, Jimbaran	Bahrain by 63 runs
T20I 3094	20 February	Udayana Cricket Ground, Jimbaran	Bahrain by 10 wickets
T20I 3097	22 February	Udayana Cricket Ground, Jimbaran	Indonesia by 8 wickets
T20I 3099	23 February	Udayana Cricket Ground, Jimbaran	Bahrain by 112 runs
T20I 3102	24 February	Udayana Cricket Ground, Jimbaran	Bahrain by 5 wickets

=== United States in Oman ===
T20I series
No.	Date	Venue	Result
T20I 3095	20 February	Oman Cricket Academy Ground, Al Amarat	United States by 7 wickets
T20I 3096	21 February	Oman Cricket Academy Ground, Al Amarat	United States by 4 wickets
T20I 3100	23 February	Oman Cricket Academy Ground, Al Amarat	United States by 8 wickets

=== Bahrain in Singapore ===
T20I series (Singas & Pearls Cup)
No.	Date	Venue	Result
T20I 3104	28 February	Singapore National Cricket Ground, Singapore	Bahrain by 31 runs
T20I 3105	1 March	Singapore National Cricket Ground, Singapore	Bahrain by 7 wickets
T20I 3106	2 March	Singapore National Cricket Ground, Singapore	Bahrain by 8 wickets
T20I 3107	4 March	Singapore National Cricket Ground, Singapore	No result
T20I 3107a	5 March	Singapore National Cricket Ground, Singapore	Match abandoned

== March ==
=== 2025 Women's Day Cup ===
Pos	Team	Pld	W	L	T	NR	Pts	NRR
1	Uganda	6	4	2	0	0	8	1.102
2	Namibia	6	3	3	0	0	6	−0.233
3	Hong Kong	6	3	3	0	0	6	−0.376
4	Nepal	6	2	4	0	0	4	−0.538

Source: ESPNcricinfo

Round-robin
No.	Date	Team 1	Team 2	Venue	Result
WT20I 2184	8 March	Uganda	Hong Kong	Entebbe Cricket Oval, Entebbe	Uganda by 8 wickets
WT20I 2185	8 March	Namibia	Nepal	Entebbe Cricket Oval, Entebbe	Namibia by 6 wickets (DLS)
WT20I 2186	9 March	Uganda	Nepal	Entebbe Cricket Oval, Entebbe	Nepal by 1 wicket
WT20I 2187	9 March	Hong Kong	Namibia	Entebbe Cricket Oval, Entebbe	Hong Kong by 4 wickets
WT20I 2189	10 March	Uganda	Namibia	Entebbe Cricket Oval, Entebbe	Uganda by 1 run
WT20I 2190	10 March	Hong Kong	Nepal	Entebbe Cricket Oval, Entebbe	Hong Kong by 2 runs
WT20I 2199	12 March	Namibia	Nepal	Entebbe Cricket Oval, Entebbe	Namibia by 23 runs
WT20I 2200	12 March	Uganda	Hong Kong	Entebbe Cricket Oval, Entebbe	Hong Kong by 4 wickets
WT20I 2202	13 March	Hong Kong	Namibia	Entebbe Cricket Oval, Entebbe	Namibia by 7 wickets
WT20I 2203	13 March	Uganda	Nepal	Entebbe Cricket Oval, Entebbe	Uganda by 40 runs
WT20I 2209	14 March	Hong Kong	Nepal	Entebbe Cricket Oval, Entebbe	Nepal by 6 wickets
WT20I 2210	14 March	Uganda	Namibia	Entebbe Cricket Oval, Entebbe	Uganda by 74 runs
Play-offs
No.	Date	Team 1	Team 2	Venue	Result
WT20I 2213a	16 March	Hong Kong	Nepal	Entebbe Cricket Oval, Entebbe	Match abandoned
WT20I 2214	16 March	Uganda	Namibia	Entebbe Cricket Oval, Entebbe	Uganda by 8 wickets

=== 2025 Pacific-France Women's T20I Championship ===
Pos	Team	Pld	W	L	T	NR	Pts	NRR
1	Vanuatu	3	3	0	0	0	6	2.067
2	Samoa	3	2	1	0	0	4	1.989
3	Fiji	3	1	2	0	0	2	−0.383
4	France	3	0	3	0	0	0	−3.869

Source: Cricheroes

Round-robin
No.	Date	Team 1	Team 2	Venue	Result
WT20I 2188	10 March	Samoa	Vanuatu	N'Du Stadium, Nouméa	Vanuatu by 8 runs
WT20I 2193	11 March	France	Vanuatu	N'Du Stadium, Nouméa	Vanuatu by 78 runs
WT20I 2194	11 March	Fiji	Samoa	N'Du Stadium, Nouméa	Samoa by 41 runs
WT20I 2197	12 March	France	Samoa	N'Du Stadium, Nouméa	Samoa by 8 wickets
WT20I 2198	12 March	Fiji	Vanuatu	N'Du Stadium, Nouméa	Vanuatu by 38 runs
WT20I 2201	13 March	France	Fiji	N'Du Stadium, Nouméa	Fiji won by 56 runs
Play-offs
No.	Date	Team 1	Team 2	Venue	Result
WT20I 2206	14 March	France	Fiji	N'Du Stadium, Nouméa	Match tied (Fiji won S/O)
WT20I 2207	14 March	Samoa	Vanuatu	N'Du Stadium, Nouméa	Samoa by 9 wickets

=== 2025 Malaysia Tri-Nation Series ===
Pos	Team	Pld	W	L	T	NR	Pts	NRR
1	Bahrain	4	3	1	0	0	6	1.144
2	Hong Kong	4	3	1	0	0	6	0.684
3	Malaysia	4	0	4	0	0	0	−1.834

Source: ESPNcricinfo

Round-robin
No.	Date	Team 1	Team 2	Venue	Result
T20I 3108	10 March	Malaysia	Bahrain	Bayuemas Oval, Pandamaran	Bahrain by 6 wickets
T20I 3110	11 March	Bahrain	Hong Kong	Bayuemas Oval, Pandamaran	Bahrain by 8 wickets
T20I 3113	12 March	Malaysia	Hong Kong	Bayuemas Oval, Pandamaran	Hong Kong by 42 runs
T20I 3116	13 March	Malaysia	Bahrain	Bayuemas Oval, Pandamaran	Bahrain by 35 runs
T20I 3118	14 March	Bahrain	Hong Kong	Bayuemas Oval, Pandamaran	Match tied (Hong Kong won S/O)
T20I 3119	15 March	Malaysia	Hong Kong	Bayuemas Oval, Pandamaran	Hong Kong by 8 wickets
Final
No.	Date	Team 1	Team 2	Venue	Result
T20I 3121	17 March	Bahrain	Hong Kong	Bayuemas Oval, Pandamaran	Bahrain by 8 wickets

=== 2025 Women's T20 World Cup Americas Qualifier ===
Pos	Team	Pld	W	L	NR	Pts	NRR	Qualification
1	United States	6	5	1	0	10	3.295	Advanced to the global qualifier
2	Canada	6	4	2	0	8	0.243	
3	Brazil	6	2	4	0	4	−1.321	
4	Argentina	6	1	5	0	2	−1.794	

Source: ESPNcricinfo

Round-robin
No.	Date	Team 1	Team 2	Venue	Result
WT20I 2191	10 March	Canada	United States	Club San Albano, Burzaco	Canada by 9 runs
WT20I 2192	10 March	Argentina	Brazil	Club San Albano, Burzaco	Brazil by 25 runs
WT20I 2195	11 March	Brazil	United States	Club San Albano, Burzaco	United States by 76 runs
WT20I 2196	11 March	Argentina	Canada	Club San Albano, Burzaco	Argentina by 1 run
WT20I 2204	13 March	Argentina	United States	Club San Albano, Burzaco	United States by 71 runs
WT20I 2205	13 March	Brazil	Canada	Club San Albano, Burzaco	Canada by 7 wickets
WT20I 2211	14 March	Argentina	Canada	Club San Albano, Burzaco	Canada by 36 runs
WT20I 2212	14 March	Brazil	United States	Club San Albano, Burzaco	United States by 66 runs
WT20I 2215	16 March	Brazil	Canada	Club San Albano, Burzaco	Canada by 29 runs
WT20I 2216	16 March	Argentina	United States	Club San Albano, Burzaco	United States by 8 wickets
WT20I 2217	17 March	Argentina	Brazil	Club San Albano, Burzaco	Brazil by 6 wickets
WT20I 2218	17 March	Canada	United States	Club San Albano, Burzaco	United States by 78 runs

=== Falkland Islands in Costa Rica ===
T20I series
No.	Date	Venue	Result
T20I 3109	10 March	Los Reyes Polo Club, Guácima	Costa Rica by 66 runs
T20I 3111	11 March	Los Reyes Polo Club, Guácima	Costa Rica by 62 runs
T20I 3112	11 March	Los Reyes Polo Club, Guácima	Costa Rica by 92 runs
T20I 3114	12 March	Los Reyes Polo Club, Guácima	Falkland Islands by 29 runs
T20I 3115	12 March	Los Reyes Polo Club, Guácima	Costa Rica by 9 wickets
T20I 3117	13 March	Los Reyes Polo Club, Guácima	Costa Rica by 47 runs

=== Canada in Namibia ===
T20I series
No.	Date	Venue	Result
T20I 3122a	18 March	Namibia Cricket Ground, Windhoek	Match abandoned
T20I 3123	19 March	Namibia Cricket Ground, Windhoek	Namibia by 3 wickets
T20I 3124a	21 March	Namibia Cricket Ground, Windhoek	Match abandoned
T20I 3125	22 March	Namibia Cricket Ground, Windhoek	Namibia by 10 wickets (DLS)
T20I 3127	23 March	Namibia Cricket Ground, Windhoek	Namibia by 8 wickets

== See also ==
- International cricket in 2024–25
