= Costa Rica national cricket team =

Costa Rica
- Association: Costa Rica Cricket Federation

Personnel
- Captain: Christopher Prasad
- Coach: Nanda Kumar

International Cricket Council
- ICC status: Associate member (2017)
- ICC region: Americas
ICC Rankings	Current	Best-ever
T20I	78th	54th (2 May 2019)

International cricket
- First international: v. Panama in Panama; April 2002

T20 Internationals
- First T20I: v. Panama at Reforma Athletic Club, Naucalpan; 25 April 2019
- Last T20I: v. Falkland Islands at Platinum Oval, Stanley; 18 November 2026
T20Is	Played	Won/Lost
Total	30	10/20 (0 ties, 0 no result)
This year	12	2/10 (0 ties, 0 no result)
- As of 18 November 2026

The Costa Rica national cricket team represents Costa Rica in international cricket. The team is organised by the Costa Rica Cricket Federation, which became an affiliate member of the International Cricket Council (ICC) in 2002 and an associate member in 2017. Costa Rica's first recorded international match came in April 2002, when it toured Panama and played against the Panamanian national side. The team's first international tournament was the inaugural edition of the Central American Championships, played in Belize in 2006. It has since regularly fielded teams in that tournament, and also made its debut in ICC Americas tournaments in 2010, at the 2010 Division Four event in Mexico.

In April 2018, the ICC decided to grant full Twenty20 International (T20I) status to all its members. Therefore, all Twenty20 matches played between Costa Rica and other ICC members after 1 January 2019 have the T20I status.

== History ==
Cricket was introduced in Costa Rica during the late 1800s by Jamaican immigrants coming to construct the country's railways. The sport continued to be played among the Afro-Caribbean population in the Caribbean coastal areas but its popularity began to decline. In recent years, however, more Costa Ricans are being introduced to the game and interest in the game is starting to grow.

Costa Rica became an affiliate member of the ICC in 2002. Their first international match was played on 18 March 2006 in the Central American Cricket Championship against Belize to whom they lost. They also lost their game against Mexico, finishing third in the tournament.

Costa Rica also took part in the 2007 Central American Cricket Championship, losing to Mexico but recording their first international win against El Salvador and finishing second in the competition.

In 2008, Costa Rica took part in the inaugural Easter Cup, an international Twenty20 tournament, against hosts Nicaragua and El Salvador. Costa Rica dominated the tournament defeating both of the other sides. The second Easter Cup was held in the December of the same year. Costa Rica finished third beating El Salvador but losing to Belize.

The following year, Costa Rica took part in the third Central American Championship, which they also hosted. They finished fourth out of the five participating teams. Their only win in the new Twenty20 format was against El Salvador who they beat by 10 wickets.

=== 2018-Present ===
In April 2018, the ICC decided to grant full Twenty20 International (T20I) status to all its members. Therefore, all Twenty20 matches played between Costa Rica and other ICC members after 1 January 2019 have the full T20I status.

Costa Rica played their first ever Twenty20 International match against Panama in 2019 Central American Cricket Championship.

25 April 2019
11:30
Scorecard

Costa Rica; 112/5 (20 overs)	v	Panama; 113/3 (15.4 overs)
Joel Cutinho 32 (37); Dilip Dahyabhai Ahir 2/11 (2 overs)		Yusuf Ebrahim 35* (23); Zain ul Tashnam 1/16 (4 overs)

Panama won by 7 wickets
Reforma Athletic Club, Naucalpan
Umpires: Bob Baxter (Mex) and Dilip Pachichigar (Mex)
Player of the match: Imran Bulbulia (Pan)

- Costa Rica won the toss and elected to bat.
- First ever T20I match for Costa Rica.

In 2024, cricket made its debut in Costa Rica's National Games as an exhibition sport.

== Grounds ==
Locations of grounds which have hosted international cricket matches within Costa Rica

== Tournament history ==
=== South American Championship ===
South American Cricket Championship records
Year	Round	Position	GP	W	L	T	NR
1995—2017	Did not participate						
(Colombia) 2018	Round-robin	3/8	7	4	3	0	0
(Peru) 2019	Did not participate						
(Brazil) 2022	Did not participate						
(Argentina) 2023	Did not participate						
(Brazil) 2024	Did not participate						
Total	1/19	–	7	4	3	0	0

=== Other tournaments ===
ICC Americas Championship	Central American Championship
2000–2008: Did not participate; 2009–10 (Division four): 3rd place; 2011 (Division three): 5th place	2006: 3rd place; 2007: 2nd place; 2009: 4th place; 2015: 6th place; 2019: 5th place; 2025: 3rd place

== Current squad ==
Updated as on 17 April 2025

This lists all the active players who played for Costa Rica in the 2025 Men's Central American Championship and the home series against Falkland Islands.

Name	Age	Batting style	Bowling style	Last T20I	Note(s)
Batters
Pushkaraj Naringrekar	34	Right-handed	Right-arm medium	(Turks and Caicos Islands) 2025	
Yeudy Altamirano	25	Right-handed	Right-arm medium	(Falkland Islands) 2025	
All-rounders
Fabian Villalobos	17	Right-handed	Right-arm medium	(Falkland Islands) 2025	
Rakesh Bharathan	38	Right-handed	Right-arm medium	(Falkland Islands) 2025	
Oswald Sam Arthur	51	Right-handed	Right-arm medium	(Turks and Caicos Islands) 2025	
Dhanush Ganesh	32	Right-handed	Right-arm medium	(Turks and Caicos Islands) 2025	
Ram Saun	32	Right-handed	Right-arm medium	(Turks and Caicos Islands) 2025	
Kendall Altamirano	25	Right-handed	Right-arm medium	(Falkland Islands) 2025	
Deepak Rawat	43	Right-handed	Right-arm medium	(Turks and Caicos Islands) 2025	
Sachin Ravikumar	38	Right-handed	Right-arm medium	(Turks and Caicos Islands) 2025	
Sudesh Pillai	42	Right-handed	Right-arm medium	(Turks and Caicos Islands) 2025	
Sham Murari	45	Right-handed	Right-arm medium	(Falkland Islands) 2025	
Wicket-keepers
TV Badri Narayanan	42	Right-handed	Right-arm off break	(Falkland Islands) 2025	Captain
Gaurav Singhdeo	40	Right-handed	—N/a	(Falkland Islands) 2025	
Kumar Shivam	34	Right-handed	—N/a	(Turks and Caicos Islands) 2025	
Pace bowlers
Santosh Shanmugam	39	Right-handed	Right-arm medium	(Falkland Islands) 2025	
Ankit Patel	20	Right-handed	Right-arm medium	(Turks and Caicos Islands) 2025	
Spin bowlers
Joseph Lucky	62	Right-handed	Right-arm off break	(Turks and Caicos Islands) 2025	

== Records ==
International Match Summary — Costa Rica

Last updated 18 November 2026

Playing Record
Format	M	W	L	T	NR	Inaugural Match
Twenty20 Internationals	30	10	20	0	0	25 April 2019

=== Twenty20 International ===
- Highest team total: 133/7 v. Mexico on 26 April 2019 at Reforma Athletic Club, Naucalpan
- Highest individual score: 46, Joel Cutinho v. Mexico on 26 April 2019 at Reforma Athletic Club, Naucalpan
- Best individual bowling figures: 3/14, Sudesh Pillai v. Mexico on 26 April 2019 at Reforma Athletic Club, Naucalpan

Most T20I runs for Costa Rica

Player	Runs	Average	Career span
Deepak Rawat	220	18.33	2024–2025
Sachin Ravikumar	202	11.88	2019–2026
Sudesh Pillai	178	11.12	2019–2026
Gopinath Murali	140	20.00	2019–2024
Gaurav Singhdeo	129	18.42	2024–2025

Most T20I wickets for Costa Rica

Player	Wickets	Average	Career span
Sham Murari	21	11.33	2019–2026
Deepak Rawat	20	11.75	2024–2025
Dhanush Ganesh	20	12.35	2024–2025
Sachin Ravikumar	16	18.00	2019–2026
Sudesh Pillai	14	25.00	2019–2026

T20I record versus other nations

Records complete to T20I #4234. Last updated 18 November 2026.

Opponent	M	W	L	T	NR	First match	First win
vs Associate Members
Belize	1	0	1	0	0	27 April 2019	
Brazil	2	0	2	0	0	3 April 2026	
Falkland Islands	14	7	7	0	0	10 March 2025	10 March 2025
Mexico	9	2	7	0	0	26 April 2019	11 April 2024
Panama	2	0	2	0	0	25 April 2019	
Turks and Caicos Islands	2	1	1	0	0	19 April 2025	20 April 2025

== See also ==
- Costa Rica women's national cricket team
- List of Costa Rica Twenty20 International cricketers
