= Turks and Caicos Cricket Association =

Turks and Caicos Cricket Association is the official governing body of the sport of cricket in Turks and Caicos Islands. Its current headquarters is in Moores Alley Grand Turk, Turks and Caicos Islands. Turks and Caicos Cricket Association is Turks and Caicos Islands's representative at the International Cricket Council and is an associate member and has been a member of that body since 2002. It is included in the ICC Americas region.
