= List of Costa Rica Twenty20 International cricketers =

This is a list of Costa Rican Twenty20 International cricketers.

In April 2018, the ICC decided to grant full Twenty20 International (T20I) status to all its members. Therefore, all Twenty20 matches played between Costa Rica and other ICC members after 1 January 2019 will be eligible for T20I status. Costa Rica's first T20I will be against Panama on 25 April 2019 in the 2019 Central American Cricket Championship.

This list comprises all members of the Costa Rica cricket team who have played at least one T20I match. It is initially arranged in the order in which each player won his first Twenty20 cap. Where more than one player won his first Twenty20 cap in the same match, those players are listed alphabetically by surname.

== Key ==
General

- ‡ – Captain
- † – Wicket-keeper
- First – Year of debut
- Last – Year of latest game
- Mat – Number of matches played

Batting

- Runs – Runs scored in career
- HS – Highest score
- Avg – Runs scored per dismissal
- * – Batsman remained not out
- 50 – Number of half centuries

Bowling

- Balls – Balls bowled in career
- Wkt – Wickets taken in career
- BBI – Best bowling in an innings
- Ave – Average runs per wicket

Fielding

- Ca – Catches taken
- St – Stumpings affected

== List of players ==
Statistics are correct as of 5 April 2026.

Costa Rica T20I cricketers
General					Batting				Bowling				Fielding		Ref
No.	Name	First	Last	Mat	Runs	HS	Avg	50	Balls	Wkt	BBI	Ave	Ca	St	Ref
1	Joel Cutinho	2019	2026	7	121	46	17.28	0	53	6	4/16	10.83	1	0	
2	Oscar Fournier	2019	2019	2	–	–	–	–	–	–	–	–	4	0	
3	Daniel Mejia	2019	2019	3	12	12	12.00	0	24	0	–	–	0	0	
4	Gopinath Murali†	2019	2024	8	140	47*	20.00	0	–	–	–	–	2	0	
5	Sham Murari	2019	2026	18	63	16	5.72	0	342	21	4/6	11.33	2	0	
6	Nanda Kumar	2019	2019	3	49	39	16.33	0	6	0	–	–	2	0	
7	Sudesh Pillai	2019	2026	19	178	43	11.12	0	373	14	3/4	25.00	5	0	
8	Christopher Prasad†‡	2019	2019	3	14	11	7.00	0	12	0	–	–	0	0	
9	Sachin Ravikumar‡	2019	2026	21	202	52	11.88	1	278	16	3/10	18.00	9	0	
10	Oswald Sam Arthur	2019	2026	10	37	16*	37.00	0	126	8	2/11	20.62	0	0	
11	Zain ul Tashnam	2019	2019	3	17	11	17.00	0	48	2	1/16	17.50	0	0	
12	Esteban Soto	2019	2019	1	0	0	0.00	0	–	–	–	–	0	0	
13	Elian Cruz	2024	2024	1	–	–	–	–	–	–	–	–	0	0	
14	Dhanush Ganesh‡	2024	2025	15	86	36*	10.75	0	330	20	4/7	12.35	2	0	
15	Imran Ahmed Kaneez	2024	2026	9	19	11	3.80	0	147	8	2/0	18.50	3	0	
16	Johan Meza	2024	2024	1	–	–	–	–	–	–	–	–	0	0	
17	Deepak Rawat	2024	2025	15	220	62*	18.33	1	270	20	4/3	11.75	4	0	
18	Kumar Shivam	2024	2026	12	46	16*	5.75	0	–	–	–	–	2	0	
19	Gaurav Singhdeo†	2024	2025	9	129	55	18.42	1	5	0	–	–	4	0	
20	Kendall Altamirano	2024	2026	8	33	12*	5.50	0	31	2	1/0	18.00	2	0	
21	Sumesh Halarnkar	2024	2024	2	0	0	0.00	0	–	–	–	–	0	0	
22	Yuberney Latouche	2024	2024	1	0	0*	–	0	–	–	–	–	0	0	
23	Joxan Obando	2024	2024	1	0	0	0.00	0	–	–	–	–	1	0	
24	Ram Saun	2024	2025	7	24	15*	4.80	0	12	0	–	–	2	0	
25	Yeudy Altamirano	2024	2025	5	29	12*	9.66	0	25	2	1/0	10.00	1	0	
26	Pushkaraj Naringrekar	2024	2026	10	23	10	3.83	0	37	2	1/4	16.00	2	0	
27	TV Badri Narayanan†	2025	2026	10	66	19	8.25	0	2	0	–	–	6	0	
28	Rakesh Bharathan	2025	2025	6	53	16	8.83	0	6	0	–	–	2	0	
29	Ankit Patel	2025	2025	8	4	2	1.00	0	30	3	2/6	5.00	2	0	
30	Fabian Villalobos	2025	2025	4	4	2	1.00	0	–	–	–	–	1	0	
31	Santhosh Shanmugam	2025	2025	3	0	0	0.00	0	36	1	1/8	29.00	0	0	
32	Joseph Lucky	2025	2025	4	1	1	1.00	0	6	0	–	–	0	0	
33	Ashar Abbas	2026	2026	3	10	10*	5.00	0	12	0	–	–	0	0	
34	Suyog Wankhade	2026	2026	4	37	19	9.25	0	24	0	–	–	3	0	
35	Tangella Amresh	2026	2026	2	9	7	4.50	0	–	–	–	–	1	0	
36	Shivamanikanth Kommula	2026	2026	1	0	0	0.00	0	–	–	–	–	0	0	
