= Costa Rica Cricket Federation =

Governing body of cricket in Costa Rica

- Sport: Cricket
- Jurisdiction: National
- Founded: 2000
- Affiliation: International Cricket Council (ICC)
- Regional affiliation: ICC Americas
- Headquarters: San José, Costa Rica

Official website
- www.costaricacricket.org
- (Costa Rica)

Costa Rica Cricket Federation (Spanish: Federacion de Críquet, Federacion de Cricket - FEDECRIC) is the official governing body of the sport of cricket in Costa Rica and is in charge of the Costa Rica national cricket team.

Costa Rica Cricket Federation is Costa Rica's representative at the International Cricket Council (ICC) and is an affiliate member and has been a member of that body since 2002. It is included in the ICC Americas region.

The organisation was known as the Costa Rica Cricket Association until it upgraded to a federation in July 2009. The benefits of this include opportunity for national representation and the possibility of gaining Olympic membership. In 2017, it became an associate member of the ICC.

In April 2018, the ICC decided to grant full Twenty20 International (T20I) status to all its members. Therefore, all Twenty20 matches played between Costa Rica and other ICC members after 1 January 2019 have the full T20I status.

== History ==
The Costa Rica Cricket League was established in 2005 and Costa Rica is a founding member of the biennial Central America Cricket Championships, inaugurated in Belize in 2006. The Costa Rica Cricket Association was formed in 2000 and registered with ICODER, the Costa Rican Sports authority in 2003. It upgraded its status to that of Federation in 2009, so inscribed at the National Registry, and in 2010 was granted National Representation as sole governing body of Cricket in Costa Rica.

== See also ==
- Costa Rica national cricket team
- Costa Rica women's national cricket team
- Costa Rica national under-19 cricket team
- Costa Rica women's national under-19 cricket team
