= List of Panama Twenty20 International cricketers =

This is a list of Pananamian Twenty20 International cricketers.

In April 2018, the ICC decided to grant full Twenty20 International (T20I) status to all its members. Therefore, all Twenty20 matches played between Panama and other ICC members after 1 January 2019 will be eligible for T20I status. Panama's first T20I was against Costa Rica on 25 April 2019 in the 2019 Central American Cricket Championship.

This list comprises all members of the Panama cricket team who have played at least one T20I match. It is initially arranged in the order in which each player won his first Twenty20 cap. Where more than one player won his first Twenty20 cap in the same match, those players are listed alphabetically by surname.

== Key ==
General

- ‡ – Captain
- † – Wicket-keeper
- First – Year of debut
- Last – Year of latest game
- Mat – Number of matches played

Batting

- Runs – Runs scored in career
- HS – Highest score
- Avg – Runs scored per dismissal
- * – Batsman remained not out
- 50 – Number of half centuries

Bowling

- Balls – Balls bowled in career
- Wkt – Wickets taken in career
- BBI – Best bowling in an innings
- Ave – Average runs per wicket

Fielding

- Ca – Catches taken
- St – Stumpings affected

== List of players ==
Statistics are correct as of 9 August 2026.

Panama T20I cricketers
General					Batting				Bowling				Fielding		Ref
No.	Name	First	Last	Mat	Runs	HS	Avg	50	Balls	Wkt	BBI	Ave	Ca	St	Ref
1	Parish Bharat Patel	2019	2019	2	4	4*	–	0	30	0	–	–	0	0	
2	Vimal Chandra†	2019	2019	3	37	26	18.50	0	–	–	–	–	2	0	
3	Dilip Dahyabhai Ahir	2019	2026	11	41	12*	10.25	0	156	8	3/11	19.50	1	0	
4	Dipakkumar Patel	2019	2019	3	0	0	0.00	0	60	2	2/17	21.00	1	0	
5	Imran Bulbulia‡	2019	2019	3	40	32	13.33	0	60	4	2/20	14.75	0	0	
6	Mahmad Data	2019	2023	4	3	3	1.50	0	41	1	1/15	52.00	1	0	
7	Anilkumar Natubhai Ahir‡†	2019	2026	30	388	51	13.85	1	491	22	4/26	21.04	14	5	
8	Mitulkumar Patel	2019	2019	2	3	3*	–	0	–	–	–	–	0	0	
9	Khengar Bhal Ahir	2019	2023	15	48	32*	–	0	278	13	3/16	25.00	1	0	
10	Vijay Sachdev	2019	2019	2	23	12*	23.00	0	–	–	–	–	1	0	
11	Yusuf Ebrahim‡	2019	2024	21	291	72	14.55	1	195	7	3/18	38.71	9	0	
12	Parth Jayeshbhai Patel	2019	2026	14	141	51	11.75	1	84	1	1/21	96.00	0	0	
13	Mohmad Sohel Patel	2019	2025	17	164	42	10.25	0	–	–	–	–	2	0	
14	Vishal Ahir	2019	2019	1	–	–	–	–	–	–	–	–	1	0	
15	Abdullah Jasat	2021	2023	10	51	17*	6.37	0	186	9	2/20	26.55	0	0	
16	Dineshbhai Ahir	2021	2021	5	38	16	7.60	0	90	4	2/21	27.50	1	0	
17	Aslam Doria	2021	2021	3	1	1	1.00	0	6	0	–	–	0	0	
18	Salim Guzman	2021	2026	9	80	17	8.88	0	–	–	–	–	2	0	
19	Irfan Hafejee‡	2021	2026	27	423	44	18.39	0	489	26	3/18	21.34	5	0	
20	Mahmud Jasat	2021	2024	20	256	35	13.47	0	12	0	–	–	9	0	
21	Rizwan Mangera†	2021	2026	7	17	9	3.40	0	–	–	–	–	2	1	
22	Nikunjh Ahir	2021	2023	11	88	23	17.60	0	114	2	1/9	95.00	4	0	
23	Yusuf Bhoola†	2021	2026	9	70	27	8.75	0	–	–	–	–	8	1	
24	Rahul Ahir	2023	2024	15	103	21	7.92	0	251	15	3/14	19.13	4	0	
25	Vishal C Ahir	2023	2023	3	27	24	13.50	0	36	0	–	–	1	0	
26	Ahmadi Ravat†	2023	2023	2	0	0	0.00	0	–	–	–	–	0	0	
27	Ahmed Patel	2023	2026	11	35	9	11.66	0	138	6	2/9	24.83	0	0	
28	Faizan Patel	2023	2026	12	106	32	9.63	0	126	3	1/12	50.00	2	0	
29	Sohel Patel	2023	2026	9	118	34	13.11	0	90	6	2/12	14.83	2	0	
30	Huzaifa Patel	2023	2023	2	25	21	12.50	0	–	–	–	–	1	0	
31	Jay Ahir	2023	2023	3	20	13	10.00	0	19	0	–	–	1	0	
32	Laxman Gaonkar‡†	2023	2025	6	67	23	11.16	0	36	1	1/21	43.00	1	1	
33	Abdulla Bhoola	2023	2026	5	11	7*	5.50	0	–	–	–	–	0	0	
34	Ibrahim Bhana	2023	2023	1	1	1	1.00	0	–	–	–	–	0	0	
35	Breeze Ahir	2024	2025	10	102	28*	12.75	0	–	–	–	–	5	0	
36	Yusuf Kachhalia	2024	2024	7	35	14	5.00	0	–	–	–	–	3	0	
37	Parth Suman Bhai Ahir†	2024	2026	9	20	10	3.33	0	–	–	–	–	3	1	
38	Sohel Desai†	2024	2026	7	11	5*	2.75	0	–	–	–	–	2	5	
39	Sanjay Ahir	2024	2025	7	12	4*	6.00	0	72	3	1/11	27.33	0	0	
40	Khandubhai Ahir†	2024	2024	3	26	22	13.00	0	–	–	–	–	0	1	
41	Meet Ahir	2025	2025	4	67	43*	33.50	0	–	–	–	–	0	0	
42	Ronitkumar Ahir	2025	2025	3	8	6	4.00	0	72	11	4/8	2.63	0	0	
43	Anskumar Ahir	2025	2025	2	2	2*	–	0	34	1	1/10	37.00	0	0	
44	Faizal Salehji	2025	2025	4	2	2	2.00	0	18	0	–	–	1	0	
45	Nazir Patel†	2025	2025	2	0	0	0.00	0	–	–	–	–	–	–	
46	Abdul Makda‡	2025	2026	6	9	9	9.00	0	66	1	1/17	75.00	0	0	
47	Yusuf Abovat	2025	2025	2	–	–	–	–	–	–	–	–	0	0	
48	Mahmed Bawa	2025	2026	9	177	47	22.12	0	162	10	3/20	8.70	0	0	
49	Nathan Ingleston	2025	2026	5	21	17*	21.00	0	48	6	3/3	6.16	0	0	
50	Safvan Patel	2025	2025	2	9	9	9.00	0	18	0	–	–	1	0	
51	Sohilkumar Ahir	2025	2025	1	–	–	–	–	–	–	–	–	1	0	
52	Sagar Kumar Ahir	2026	2026	2	0	0	0.00	0	18	2	2/8	14.50	0	0	
53	Ahmed Bangali	2026	2026	2	–	–	–	–	–	–	–	–	2	0	
54	Akash Ahir	2026	2026	3	4	4	4.00	0	18	1	1/16	16.00	1	0	
55	Bhavik Ahir	2026	2026	3	16	11*	16.00	0	–	–	–	–	0	0	
56	Kalpesh Ahir	2026	2026	4	8	8	8.00	0	3	0	–	–	0	0	
57	Lalu Bhai Ahir	2026	2026	4	53	24	17.66	0	84	6	3/17	13.00	0	0	
58	Sufiyan Tarajia	2026	2026	4	53	24	17.66	0	78	4	2/18	19.50	0	0	
59	Sarkar Ameji	2026	2026	3	0	0*	–	–	36	0	–	–	0	0	
60	Chetan Kumar Ahir	2026	2026	1	0	0	0.00	0	–	–	–	–	0	0	
