= ICC Americas =

Cricket governing body

- Formation: 2001; 23 years ago
- Purpose: Cricket administration
- Headquarters: Toronto, Canada (2001-2016); Colorado Springs, United States (2016-present)
- Region served: Americas
- Members: 17
- Official language: English
- Regional Development Manager: Fara Gorsi
- Parent organization: ICC
- Website: americas

The ICC Americas is the International Cricket Council region responsible for administration of the sport of cricket in the Americas. It is a subordinate body to the International Cricket Council (ICC). The organisation currently has 17 members, located in Northern America, Central America, South America, and the Caribbean, and is responsible for the development, promotion and administration of the game in the above regions.

ICC Americas oversees the regional qualification tournaments for the Cricket World Cup, the Women's Cricket World Cup, the ICC Men's T20 World Cup, the ICC Women's T20 World Cup, and the Under-19 Cricket World Cup. Previously it ran the ICC Americas Championship as the premier international competition in the region. The World Cup itself has only been held in the region on a single occasion, when the 2007 World Cup was hosted by the West Indies. In 2024, the T20 World Cup was held here when it was hosted by West Indies and USA jointly. Previously the regional office was located in Toronto, but it was relocated to Colorado Springs, Colorado, in 2016.

== Members ==
Members of the ICC Americas
No.	Country	Association	ICC Membership Status	ICC Membership	ICC Americas Membership
Full Members (1)
1	West Indies	Cricket West Indies (Note: represents the associations of Anguilla, Antigua and Barbuda, Barbados, British Virgin Islands, Dominica, Grenada, Guyana, Jamaica, Montserrat, Saint Kitts and Nevis, Saint Lucia, Saint Vincent and the Grenadines, Sint Maarten, Trinidad and Tobago,U.S. Virgin Islands.)	Full Member	31 May 1926	2001
Associate members with ODI and T20I status (2)
2	Canada	Cricket Canada	Associate	1968	2001
3	United States	USA Cricket	Associate	1965–2017, 2019	2001
Associate members with T20I status (14)
4	Argentina	Cricket Argentina	Associate	1974	
5	Bahamas	Bahamas Cricket Association	Associate	2017	
6	Belize	Belize National Cricket Association	Associate	2017	
7	Bermuda	Bermuda Cricket Board	Associate	1966	
8	Brazil	Brazilian Cricket Confederation	Associate	2017	
9	Cayman Islands	Cayman Islands Cricket Association	Associate	2002	
10	Chile	Chilean Cricket Association	Associate	2017	
11	Costa Rica	Costa Rica Cricket Federation	Associate	2017	
12	Falkland Islands	Falkland Cricket Association	Associate	2017	
13	Mexico	Mexico Cricket Association	Associate	2017	
14	Panama	Panama Cricket Association	Associate	2017	
15	Peru	Peru Cricket Association	Associate	2017	
16	Suriname	Suriname Cricket Board	Associate	2011	
17	Turks and Caicos Islands	Turks and Caicos Cricket Association	Associate	2017	

=== Former members ===
No.	Country	Association	ICC Americas Membership period
1	Cuba	Cuban Cricket Commission	2002–2013

Following their suspension in 2013, ICC never issued a media release confirming Cuba were expelled but the name of the member is no longer found in any of the pages of ICC website.

=== Future Members ===
No.	Country	Association	ICC Membership period
1	Aruba	Aruba Cricket Association	—N/a
2	Colombia	Cricket Colombia	—N/a
3	Ecuador	Cricket Ecuador	—N/a
4	El Salvador	El Salvador Cricket	—N/a
5	Guatemala	Cricket Guatemala	—N/a
6	Puerto Rico	Puerto Rico Cricket Association	—N/a
7	Uruguay	Cricket Uruguay	—N/a
8	Venezuela	Venezuela Cricket Association	—N/a

== Map ==
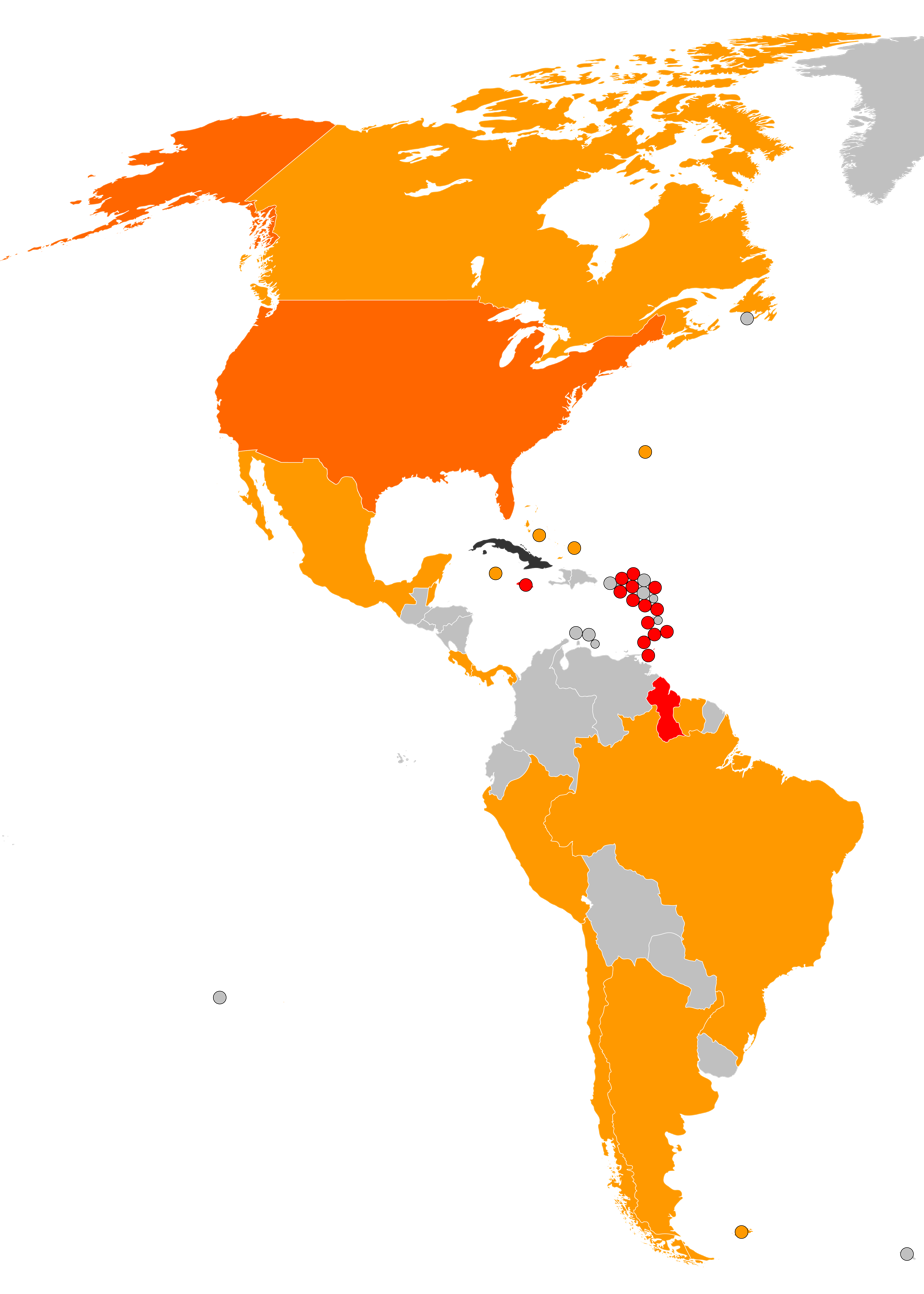
Members of the International Cricket Council located in the Americas. Full members (1 -> West Indies) Associate members with ODI status (2 -> Canada & United States) Associate members (14) Former members (1) Non-members

== Tournaments ==
Tournament	Latest edition	Champions	Next edition
Men's North American Cup	2025	United States	2026
Men's Central American Championship	2026	Brazil	2027
South American Cricket Championship	2024	Panama	2025
Women's South American Cricket Championship	2024	Brazil	2025

== Related organisations ==
The short-lived Cricket Council of the Americas (CCAM) was formed in April 2001, after delegates from fifteen countries met in Antigua. The organisation was patterned after the three existing regional cricket councils at the time, (Note: The Africa Cricket Association, the Asian Cricket Council, and the European Cricket Council.) and it was noted that one of its primary reasons for existence was "to deliver more effectively and efficiently the ICC development programme". It was stated that, as a result of the council's establishment, "the region [would] now be responsible for the strategy and the delivery of its own development programmes, as well as tournament management and funding arrangements".

The council had fifteen members at its peak, listed below. (Note: There is conflicting information about whether Chile and Paraguay were, in fact, members of the council. An April 2001 article published by CricInfo reported that the CCAM had 15 members, including the Chile Cricket Association and Paraguay Cricket Association. However, an ICC media release in August 2001 listed only 13 members, omitting those countries.) The inaugural meeting was also attended by delegates from two other countries, Guadeloupe and Mexico, but those countries were not given membership.

- Argentina
- Bahamas
- Belize
- Bermuda
- Brazil
- Canada
- Cayman Islands
- Chile
- Costa Rica
- Cuba
- Panama
- Peru
- Turks and Caicos Islands
- United States
- West Indies

== Representative teams ==
=== Senior men's team ===
In June 2015, it was announced that a combined team from the Americas development region would participate in the 2015–16 season of the Regional Super50, the West Indian domestic limited-overs competition. To select the squad for the tournament, an open combine was held in September 2015 at the Indianapolis World Sports Park, divided into two sections. The first part of the combine featured 83 invitees from five countries, although the vast majority (65, or 78 percent) were from the United States. Another 21 players were fast-tracked to the second part of the combine, where they were eventually joined by 12 of the first-section participants. The final squad featured nine Americans and six Canadians, with no other countries represented.

=== Senior women's team ===
Following the 2007 Women's Americas Championship in King City, Ontario, an Americas Select XI was selected from the three participating teams (Argentina, Bermuda, and Canada). Captained by Ave Mogan, a Canadian, the team played a one-off match against the Trinidad and Tobago national women's under-17 side, which it lost by five wickets.

The exercise was repeated after the 2009 Americas Championship in Fort Lauderdale, Florida, which featured two new teams (Brazil and the United States). With U.S. player Roselyn Emmanuel serving as captain, the team's opponent was a Trinidad and Tobago development XI, which went on to win by 29 runs in a rain-interrupted match at Central Broward Regional Park.

=== Age-group teams ===
At the 2000 Under-19 World Cup in Sri Lanka, the Americas development region was represented by a combined team, captained by future Canadian international Ashish Bagai. The team failed to win a single match (a fate it shared with Namibia), with its closest game being a seven-run loss to the Netherlands. Four countries were represented in the 14-man squad, which featured three Americans, three Argentines, four Bermudians, and four Canadians. All matches at the World Cup held under-19 One Day International (ODI) status.

A combined Americas under-19 team also played at the 2002, 2003, and 2004 editions of the West Indies Cricket Board's under-19 tournament. The 2002 event featured both three-day and one-day tournaments, with the latter played as a knock-out cup. However, the team, which featured Caymanian players for the first time, did not win a match in either format. That performance was repeated at both the 2003 and 2004 events.

In 2012, it was announced that the Americas development region would field a combined team in the WICB regional under-19 tournament, although it would have the age restriction loosened by one year compared to the other teams. The 2012 tournament was interrupted by rain, but the Americas under-20s side lost all three of its six matches where a result was possible. The team won its first ever match the following year, defeating the Leeward Islands by three wickets, but were once again winless at the 2014 event, and were not invited back in 2015.

=== Under-19 women's team ===
Official flag/logo of NextGen XI.

In August 2026, a combined development team named NextGen XI (also known as the ICC Americas U19 Women's NextGen XI) participated in the 2026 Under-19 Women's T20 World Cup Americas Qualifier, which was held in the Cayman Islands. Formed to provide additional match experience for emerging associate players in the region, the team competed alongside national under-19 sides including Argentina, Canada, and the United States. Although its fixtures were played as non-qualifying development matches toward the World Cup spots, the NextGen XI finished third in the tournament standings, securing two victories during the group stage.

== See also ==
- History of the West Indian cricket team
- List of International Cricket Council members
- West Indies women's cricket team
- Cricket in Argentina
