= 2025 Men's Central American Championship =

2025 Edition of the Central American Championship

2025 Central American Championship
- Dates: 17 – 21 April 2025
- Administrator(s): ICC Americas
- Cricket format: Twenty20 International
- Tournament format(s): Round-robin and play-offs
- Host(s): Panama
- Champions: Panama; Mexico
- Participants: 4
- Matches: 8
- Most runs: (Turks and Caicos Islands) Jerome Daley (87)
- Most wickets: (Panama) Ronitkumar Ahir (11)

The 2025 Central American Championship was the tenth edition of the Central American Championship, a cricket tournament contested in Panama from 17 to 21 April 2025. The four participating teams were Panama, Costa Rica, Mexico and Turks and Caicos Islands. This tournament marked Turks and Caicos Islands return to international cricket after 16 years.

== Round-robin ==
=== Points table ===
Pos	Team	Pld	W	L	NR	Pts	NRR
1	Panama	3	3	0	0	6	1.991
2	Mexico	3	2	1	0	4	2.693
3	Turks and Caicos Islands	3	1	2	0	2	−0.267
4	Costa Rica	3	0	3	0	0	−5.185

Source: ESPNcricinfo

=== Fixtures ===
17 April 2025
10:00
Scorecard

Mexico; 174/4 (20 overs)	v	Costa Rica; 50 (11.2 overs)

Mexico won by 124 runs
Clayton, Panama City

17 April 2025
15:00
Scorecard

Panama; 145 (19 overs)	v	Turks and Caicos Islands; 96 (18.2 overs)

Panama won by 49 runs
Clayton, Panama City

18 April 2025
10:00
Scorecard

Costa Rica; 91/6 (20 overs)	v	Panama; 92/1 (10.5 overs)

Panama won by 9 wickets
Clayton, Panama City

18 April 2025
15:00
Scorecard

Turks and Caicos Islands; 99 (20 overs)	v	Mexico; 100/2 (14 overs)

Mexico won by 8 wickets
Clayton, Panama City

19 April 2025
10:00
Scorecard

Costa Rica; 71/8 (20 overs)	v	Turks and Caicos Islands; 74/0 (8.1 overs)

Turks and Caicos Islands won by 10 wickets
Clayton, Panama City

19 April 2025
15:00
Scorecard

Panama; 115 (19.5 overs)	v	Mexico; 109 (19.4 overs)

Panama won by 6 runs
Clayton, Panama City

== Play-offs ==
=== 3rd-place play-off ===
20 April 2025
10:00
Scorecard

Turks and Caicos Islands; 127/7 (20 overs)	v	Costa Rica; 68/0 (9 overs)
Ariharan Kuthalingham 24 (24); Oswald Sam Arthur 2/11 (3 overs)		Dhanush Ganesh 36* (29)

Costa Rica won by 21 runs (DLS method)
Clayton, Panama City
Player of the match: Dhanush Ganesh (CRC)

- Turks and Caicos Islands won the toss and elected to bat
- No further play was possible due to rain.

=== Final ===
20 April 2025
15:00
Scorecard

Panama	v	Mexico

Match abandoned
Clayton, Panama City
Umpires: Arnold Maddela (Can) and Rohan Shah (Can)

- No toss
- No play was possible due to rain.
