= Panama national cricket team =

Panama
- Association: Panama Cricket Association

Personnel
- Captain: Anilkumar Ahir
- Coach: Vipulkumar Patel

International Cricket Council
- ICC status: Associate member (2017)
- ICC region: Americas
ICC Rankings	Current	Best-ever
T20I	76th	51th (12-May-2019)

International cricket
- First international: 1964 v Trinidad and Tobago at Panama

T20 Internationals
- First T20I: v Costa Rica at Reforma Athletic Club, Naucalpan; 25 April 2019
- Last T20I: v Brazil at Los Pinos Polo Club Field 1, Cundinamarca; 9 August 2026
T20Is	Played	Won/Lost
Total	37	13/22 (0 ties, 2 no results)
This year	7	4/3 (0 ties, 0 no results)
- T20 World Cup Qualifier appearances: 1 (Note: T20 World Cup Qualifier refers to the Regional Final of the ICC Americas region from the 2023 edition.) (first in 2023)
- Best result: 4th place (2023)
T20I kit
- As of 9 August 2026

The Panama national cricket team represents Panama in international cricket. The Panama Cricket Association became an affiliate member of the International Cricket Council (ICC) in 2002 and is an associate member since 2017. Their international debut is believed to have taken place against a side from Trinidad and Tobago in 1964.

In April 2018, the ICC decided to grant full Twenty20 International (T20I) status to all its members. Therefore, all Twenty20 matches played between Panama and other ICC members after 1 January 2019 will be eligible to have full T20I status.

== History ==
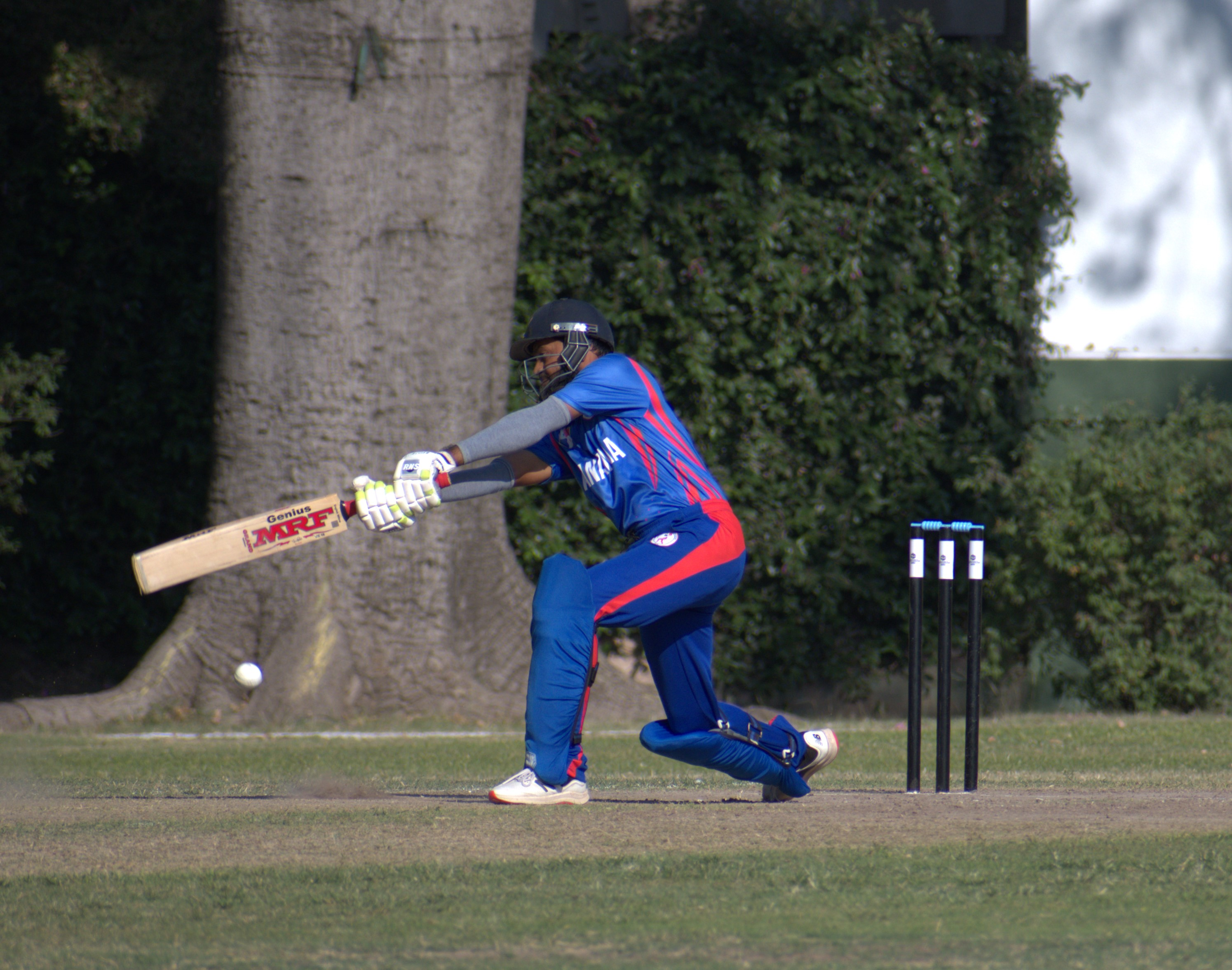
Panama team during a T20I match against Bermuda for the 2023 ICC Men's T20 World Cup Americas Qualifier.

Cricket was introduced to Panama by colonials from the West Indies during the creation of the Panama Canal. After the colonials left the country, most of the nation's attention was turned to cricket. The growing number of inhabitants of Indian origin created a group called the Indian Society. The purpose of this society was to create opportunities for relationships and to find new venues in which cricket could be played. Due to this effort, the popularity of the game grew. Panama joined the ICC as an Affiliate Member in 2002 and since then, cricket has been flourishing among the younger population of the country.

=== 2018-Present ===
In April 2018, the ICC decided to grant full Twenty20 International (T20I) status to all its members. Therefore, all Twenty20 matches played between Panama and other ICC members after 1 January 2019 will be a full T20I.

In September 2018, Panama took part in 2018–19 ICC T20 World Cup Americas Qualifier, finished on 3rd place in Northern Sub Region.

Panama played their first ever Twenty20 International match against Costa Rica in 2019 Central American Cricket Championship.

25 April 2019
11:30
Scorecard

Costa Rica; 112/5 (20 overs)	v	Panama; 113/3 (15.4 overs)
Joel Cutinho 32 (37); Dilip Dahyabhai Ahir 2/11 (2 overs)		Yusuf Ebrahim 35* (23); Zain ul Tashnam 1/16 (4 overs)

Panama won by 7 wickets
Reforma Athletic Club, Naucalpan
Umpires: Bob Baxter (Mex) and Dilip Pachichigar (Mex)
Player of the match: Imran Bulbulia (Pan)

- Costa Rica won the toss and elected to bat.
- First ever T20I match for Panama.

== Grounds ==
- Clayton Panama, Panama City
Locations of all stadiums which have hosted international cricket matches within Panama

== International competition ==
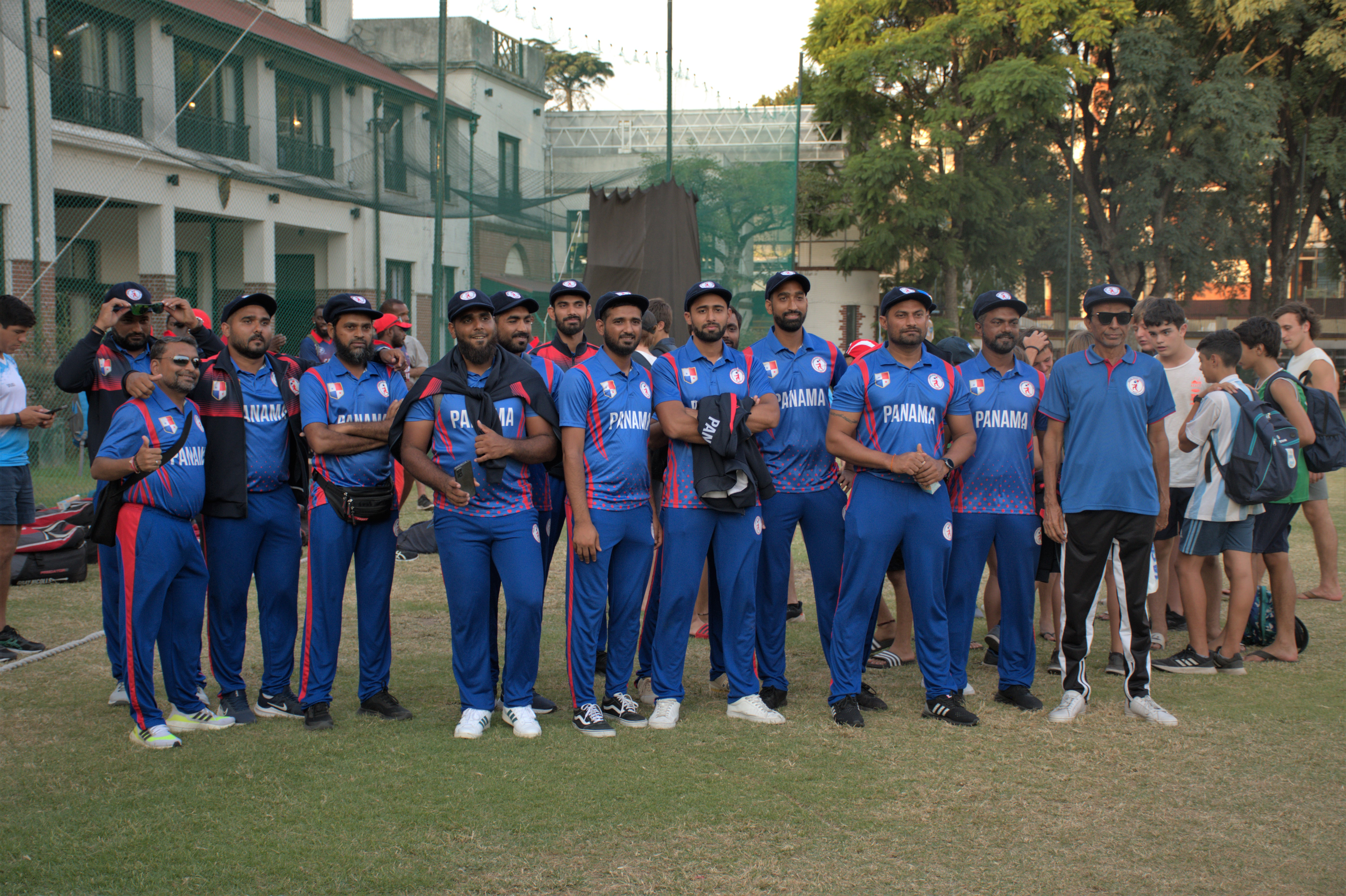
Panama at the 2023 ICC Americas Sub-Regional Qualifier in Argentina

The team's first international matches in recent years came in a friendly series played against Venezuela in 2000, which Panama won 1–0. Panama was invited to play in the fourth South American Cricket Championships later that year. The team performed well in its first international tournament, finishing fourth of the seven teams.

Panama has been playing without the services of a national coach. Playing in recent regional ICC tournaments, Panama has finished second and third, ahead of countries such as Belize, Brazil, and Turks and Caicos. The most recent participation came in the 2010 Americas Division Two, held in the Bahamas, where the team won three matches out of four and only missed out on promotion on net run-rate.

== Development programme ==
The chief concern is the loss of cricket grounds. During recent years, four grounds have been lost to soccer due to financial difficulties. The Panama Cricket Association is therefore looking to a secure a ground for its national players.

Plans are being made to start coaching for junior players but once again this is limited by finances as use of a gym is required, due to a rainy season that lasts for eight months of the year.

== Progress in Tournaments since 2002 ==
In 2002, Panama was granted affiliate status by the ICC along with a number of other countries in the Americas Region. Two years later, they hosted their first international tournament, the Americas Affiliate Championships. They finished as runners up to the Bahamas, just missing out on qualification for the ICC Americas Championship.

The affiliates tournament was expanded to a multi-division competition in 2006, and Panama was placed in Division Two. They finished third in that tournament, which was played in Argentina, behind the hosts and the Bahamas. They retained their place in Division Two for 2008. In this part of the competition, played in Suriname, Panama finished in third place and remained in the division for the next cycle, in 2010. In the same year, Panama also finished in 3rd place behind Suriname and the hosts, the Bahamas. In the 2011 Championship, Panama stayed as runners-up behind Suriname in Division 2.

Panama entered and hosted the Central American Championships for the first time in 2009. They came in as favorites, being the strongest Central American international side, and won the competition. The tournament was their first international Twenty20 competition.

Panama also took part in the America Regional T20 3rd Division Championship in Buenos Aires, Argentina in March 2014.

== Tournament history ==
=== T20 World Cup Americas Regional Final ===
T20 World Cup Americas Regional Final (Note: Regional Final of the ICC Americas region is the final stage of qualification for T20 World Cup from 2023 edition.) records
Year	Round	Position	GP	W	L	T	NR
(Bermuda) 2019	Did not qualify						
(Antigua and Barbuda) 2021	Round-robin	6/7	6	1	5	0	0
(Bermuda) 2023	Round-robin	4/4	6	0	4	0	2
(Canada) 2025	Did not qualify						
Total	0 Titles	2/4	12	1	9	0	2

=== T20 World Cup Americas Sub-regional Qualifiers ===
T20 World Cup Americas Sub-regional Qualifiers records
Year	Round	Position	GP	W	L	T	NR
(United States) 2018	Round-robin	3/4	6	1	5	0	0
(Argentina) 2023	Round-robin (A)	3/5	4	1	3	0	0
(Argentina) 2024	Round-robin	7/9	8	2	6	0	0
(Bermuda) 2026	Round-robin	/5	4	2	1	0	1
Total	0 Titles	4/4	22	6	15	0	1

=== South American Championship ===
South American Cricket Championship records
Year	Round	Position	GP	W	L	T	NR
(Argentina) 1995	Did not participate						
(Argentina) 1997	Did not participate						
(Peru) 1999	Did not participate						
(Argentina) 2000	Play-offs	4/7	4	2	1	0	1
(Argentina) 2002	Did not participate						
(Chile) 2004	Did not participate						
(Peru) 2007	Did not participate						
(Brazil) 2009	Did not participate						
(Chile) 2011	Did not participate						
(Argentina) 2013	Did not participate						
(Peru) 2014	Did not participate						
(Chile) 2015	Did not participate						
(Brazil) 2016	Did not participate						
(Argentina) 2017	Did not participate						
(Colombia) 2018	Did not participate						
(Peru) 2019	Did not participate						
(Brazil) 2022	Did not participate						
(Argentina) 2023	Play-offs	7/8	4	2	2	0	0
(Brazil) 2024	Champions	1/8	4	3	0	0	1
(Brazil) 2025	Runners-up	2/6	5	3	0	0	2
(Colombia) 2026	TBD						
Total	0 Titles	5/20	17	10	3	0	4

=== Central American Championship ===
Central American Championship records
Host/Year	Round	Position	GP	W	L	T	NR
(Belize) 2001	Did not participate						
(Belize) 2006	Did not participate						
(Mexico) 2007	Did not participate						
(Costa Rica) 2009	Champions	1/5	4	4	0	0	0
(Panama) 2015	Champions	1/6	Records not available				
(Mexico) 2019	Round-robin	3/5	4	2	2	0	0
(Belize) 2023	Did not participate						
(Costa Rica) 2024	Did not participate						
(Panama) 2025	Champions	1/4	3	3	0	0	0
(Mexico) 2026	Did not participate						
Total (Note: Complete records of some tournaments are unavailable.)	3 Titles	4/10	11	9	2	0	0

=== Other tournaments ===
Americas Affiliates Championship	Americas Championship
(Honduras) 2001: Round-robin; (Costa Rica) 2004: Runners-up	(Suriname) 2006: Round-robin; (Argentina) 2006: Round-robin; (The Bahamas) 2010: Round-robin; (Suriname) 2011: Round-robin; (The Bahamas) 2013: Round-robin

== Current squad ==
Updated as on 17 April 2025

This lists all the active players who played for Panama in the 2025 Men's Central American Championship and the home series against Falkland Islands.

Name	Age	Batting style	Bowling style	Last T20I	Note(s)
Batters
Faizan Patel	32	Right-handed	Right-arm medium	(Mexico) 2025	
Mahmud Jasat	33	Left-handed	Right-arm medium	(Mexico) 2025	
Yusuf Ebrahim	39	Right-handed	Right-arm medium	(Mexico) 2025	
Rahul Ahir	30	Right-handed	Right-arm medium	(Mexico) 2025	
Meet Ahir	25	Right-handed	Right-arm medium	(Mexico) 2025	
Yusuf Kachhalia	31	Right-handed	—N/a	(Belize) 2024	
All-rounders
Irfan Hafejee	43	Right-handed	Right-arm medium	(Costa Rica) 2025	
Parth Jayeshbhai Patel	35	Right-handed	Right-arm medium	(Mexico) 2025	
Breeze Ahir	25	Left-handed	Leg break	(Mexico) 2025	
Abdullah Jasat	32	Right-handed	Left-arm medium	(Canada) 2023	
Ronitkumar Ahir	31	Right-handed	Right-arm medium	(Mexico) 2025	
Wicket-keepers
Anilkumar Natubhai Patel	39	Right-handed	Left-arm medium	(Mexico) 2025	Captain
Laxman Gaonkar	38	Right-handed	—N/a	(Mexico) 2025	
Sohel Ebrahim Desai	29	Right-handed	—N/a	(Mexico) 2024	
Pace bowlers
Ahmed Patel	33	Right-handed	Right-arm medium	(Mexico) 2025	
Nikunj Ahir	28	Right-handed	Right-arm medium-fast	(Bermuda) 2023	
Sohel Patel	39	Right-handed	Right-arm medium	(Mexico) 2023	
Sanjay Kumar Ahir	34	Right-handed	Right-arm medium	(Turks and Caicos Islands) 2025	
Parth Suman Bhai Ahir	25	Right-handed	Right-arm medium	(Costa Rica) 2025	

== Records ==
International Match Summary — Panama

Last updated 9 August 2026

Playing Record
Format	M	W	L	T	NR	Inaugural Match
Twenty20 Internationals	37	13	22	0	2	25 April 2019

=== Twenty20 International ===
- Panama's highest score: 155/4 v Brazil, 22 June 2026 at White Hill Field, Sandys Parish
- Highest individual score: 72, Yusuf Ebrahim v Mexico, 27 April 2019 at Reforma Athletic Club, Naucalpan
- Best bowling figures in an innings: 4/8, Ronitkumar Ahir v Turks and Caicos Islands on 17 April 2025 at Clayton, Panama City.

Most T20I runs for Panama

Player	Runs	Average	Career span
Irfan Hafejee	423	18.39	2021–2026
Anilkumar Natubhai Ahir	388	13.85	2019–2026
Yusuf Ebrahim	291	14.55	2019–2024
Mahmud Jasat	256	13.47	2021–2024
Mahmed Bawa	177	22.12	2025–2026

Most T20I wickets for Panama

Player	Wickets	Average	Career span
Irfan Hafejee	26	21.34	2021–2026
Anilkumar Natubhai Ahir	22	21.04	2019–2026
Rahul Ahir	15	19.13	2023–2024
Khengar Ahir	13	25.00	2019–2023
Ronitkumar Ahir	11	2.63	2025–2025

T20I record versus other nations

Records complete to T20I #4063. Last updated 9 August 2026.

Opponent	M	W	L	T	NR	First match	First win
vs Associate Members
Argentina	3	1	2	0	0	10 November 2021	25 February 2023
Bahamas	4	2	2	0	0	13 November 2021	13 November 2021
Belize	3	0	3	0	0	26 April 2019	
Bermuda	6	0	6	0	0	11 November 2021	
Brazil	5	1	3	0	1	12 December 2024	22 June 2026
Canada	2	0	2	0	0	14 November 2021	
Cayman Islands	3	0	3	0	0	2 March 2023	
Costa Rica	2	2	0	0	0	25 April 2019	25 April 2019
Mexico	5	4	0	0	1	27 April 2019	27 April 2019
Peru	1	1	0	0	0	8 August 2026	8 August 2026
Suriname	1	1	0	0	0	6 December 2024	6 December 2024
Turks and Caicos Islands	1	1	0	0	0	17 April 2025	17 April 2025
United States	1	0	1	0	0	7 November 2021	

Historic century During the 2008 ICC World Cricket League Americas Region Division Two, held in Paramaribo, Suriname, Irfan Tarajia Hafejee became the first Panamanian cricketer to score a century in an official International Cricket Council (ICC) tournament match. On 3 April 2008, opening the batting against Suriname, he scored 102 runs from 147 balls, including a century that guided Panama to 251/9 in 50 overs. Panama subsequently defeated Suriname by 31 runs, and Tarajia was named Player of the Match for his all-round performance. (icc)

The innings is regarded as a milestone in the history of Panamanian cricket, representing the country’s first century by a batsman in an official ICC competition. In the same tournament, Tarajia hafeje finished among the leading run-scorers and was recognized as the tournament’s Best Batsman, further establishing himself as one of Panama’s leading cricketers. (icc)

References

1. ESPN Cricinfo. Panama v Suriname, ICC World Cricket League Americas Region Division Two, 3 April 2008 – Full Scorecard. https://www.espncricinfo.com/series/icc-world-cricket-league-americas-region-division-two-2007-08-345265/panama-vs-suriname-345270/full-scorecard
2. International Cricket Council (ICC). Bahamas captures ICC Americas Division 2 title. https://www.icc-cricket.com/news/bahamas-captures-icc-americas-division-2-title
3. International Cricket Council (ICC). Panama national cricket team (captain and historical records). https://en.wikipedia.org/wiki/Panama_national_cricket_team

== See also ==
- List of Panama Twenty20 International cricketers
- George Headley
