= List of Timor-Leste Twenty20 International cricketers =

This is a list of Timor-Leste Twenty20 International cricketers.

In April 2018, the ICC decided to grant full Twenty20 International (T20I) status to all its members. Therefore, all Twenty20 matches played between Timor-Leste and other ICC members after 1 January 2019 have T20I status.

This list will comprise all members of the Timor-Leste cricket team who have played at least one T20I match. It is initially arranged in the order in which each player won his first Twenty20 cap. Where more than one player will win his first Twenty20 cap in the same match, those players will be listed alphabetically by surname (according to the name format used by ESPNcricinfo).

Timor-Leste played their first match with T20I status on 6 November 2025 against Indonesia during the 2025 Rising East Asia Tri-Series.

== Key ==
General

- ‡ – Captain
- † – Wicket-keeper
- First – Year of debut
- Last – Year of latest game
- Mat – Number of matches played

Batting

- Runs – Runs scored in career
- HS – Highest score
- Avg – Runs scored per dismissal
- * – Batsman remained not out
- 50 – Half-centuries scored
- 100 – Centuries scored

Bowling

- Balls – Balls bowled in career
- Wkt – Wickets taken in career
- BBI – Best bowling in an innings
- Ave – Average runs per wicket

Fielding

- Ca – Catches taken
- St – Stumpings affected

== Players ==
Statistics are correct as of 14 November 2025.

Cap	Name	First	Last	Mat	Batting					Bowling				Fielding		Ref(s)
Cap	Name	First	Last	Mat	Runs	HS	Avg	50	100	Balls	Wkt	BBI	Ave	Ca	St	Ref(s)
1	Arif Hosen	2025	2025	7	4	2	0.66	0	0	–	–	–	–	–	–	
2	Goncalo Cardos	2025	2025	8	24	9	3.00	0	0	6	0	–	–	1	–	
3	Domingos Mendonca	2025	2025	8	18	9	2.25	0	0	–	–	–	–	–	–	
4	Rafael Morein	2025	2025	8	2	2	2.00	0	0	–	–	–	–	–	–	
5	Nazmul Huda	2025	2025	8	22	8*	4.40	0	0	43	3	1/5	21.66	–	–	
6	Egidio Pimheiro†	2025	2025	8	13	8	1.85	0	0	–	–	–	–	4	–	
7	Rahat Kazi	2025	2025	8	35	13	4.37	0	0	54	1	1/11	98.00	2	–	
8	Raihan Hossain	2025	2025	8	69	19	8.62	0	0	48	1	1/15	67.00	1	–	
9	Suhail Sattar	2025	2025	8	41	21	5.12	0	0	78	4	2/33	31.75	–	–	
10	Elias Tilman‡	2025	2025	8	4	3*	1.00	0	0	108	4	3/32	43.75	1	–	
11	Yahya Suhail	2025	2025	8	81	53*	11.57	1	0	52	2	2/25	36.00	–	–	
12	Tayyeb Javed	2025	2025	1	8	8	8.00	0	0	–	–	–	–	–	–	
