= Timor-Leste national cricket team =

International cricket team of Timor-Leste

Timor-Leste
- Association: Cricket Timor Leste

Personnel
- Captain: Elias Tilman

International Cricket Council
- ICC status: Associate member (2025)
- ICC region: East Asia-Pacific
ICC Rankings	Current	Best-ever
T20I	97th	95th (08-Dec-2025)

T20 Internationals
- First T20I: v Indonesia at Udayana Cricket Ground, Jimbaran; 6 November 2025
- Last T20I: v Myanmar at Udayana Cricket Ground, Jimbaran; 14 November 2025
T20Is	Played	Won/Lost
Total	8	0/8 (0 ties, 0 no results)
This year	0	0/0 (0 ties, 0 no results)
- As of 14 November 2025

The Timor-Leste national cricket team is the team that represents the country of Timor-Leste in international cricket matches. It is administered by the Cricket Timor Leste, which became an associate member of the International Cricket Council in 2025.

In April 2018, the ICC decided to grant full Twenty20 International (T20I) status to all its members. Therefore, all Twenty20 matches played between Timor-Leste and other ICC members after 1 January 2019 have the full T20I status.

== History ==
=== Associate membership (2025–present) ===
Timor-Leste became an associate member of the ICC in July 2025, making its T20I debut four months later in November 2025 at the 2025 Rising East Asia Tri-Series against Indonesia.

06 November 2025
14:00
Scorecard

Timor-Leste; 61 (19 overs)	v	Indonesia; 62/0 (4 overs)
Suhail Sattar 14 (15); Gede Arta 2/12 (4 overs)		Gede Priandana 31 (15)

Indonesia won by 10 wickets
Udayana Cricket Ground, Jimbaran
Umpires: Wellingson (Idn) and Yousuf Wadu (Idn)
Player of the match: Dewa Wiswi (Idn)

- Timor-Leste won the toss and elected to bat.
- First ever T20I match for Timor-Leste.

== Records and statistics ==
International Match Summary — Timor-Leste

Last updated 14 November 2025

Playing Record
Format	M	W	L	T	NR	Inaugural Match
Twenty20 Internationals	8	0	8	0	0	9 November 2025

=== Twenty20 International ===
- Highest team total: 93/7 v. Myanmar on 14 November 2025 at Udayana Cricket Ground, Jimbaran.
- Highest individual score: 53*, Muhammad Yahya Suhail v. Myanmar on 14 November 2025 at Udayana Cricket Ground, Jimbaran.
- Best individual bowling figures: 3/32, Elias Tilman v. Myanmar on 12 November 2025 at Udayana Cricket Ground, Jimbaran.

T20I record versus other nations

Records complete to T20I #3578. Last updated 14 November 2025.

Opponent	M	W	L	T	NR	First match	First win
vs Associate Members
Indonesia	4	0	4	0	0	6 November 2025	
Myanmar	4	0	4	0	0	7 November 2025	

== See also ==
- List of Timor-Leste Twenty20 International cricketers
