= International cricket in 2025–26 =

International cricket season

The 2025–26 International cricket season took place from late September 2025 to March 2026. This calendar included men's Test, ODI and T20I matches between full member teams, women's Test, ODI and T20I matches, as well as some other significant series. In addition to the matches shown here, a number of other T20I series involving associate nations were played during this period.

The 2025 Women's Cricket World Cup took place in India and Sri Lanka from September to November 2025. The 2025 Asia Cup was held in September 2025 in the United Arab Emirates, while India and Sri Lanka hosted the 2026 Men's T20 World Cup in February and March 2026.

== Season overview ==
=== Men's events ===
International tours
| Start date | Home team | Away team | Results [Matches] | | |
| Start date | Home team | Away team | Test | ODI | T20I |
|---|---|---|---|---|---|
| 15 September 2025 | Zimbabwe | Namibia | —N/a | —N/a | 2–1 [3] |
| 27 September 2025 | (United Arab Emirates) Nepal | West Indies | —N/a | —N/a | 2–1 [3] |
| 1 October 2025 | New Zealand | Australia | —N/a | —N/a | 0–2 [3] |
| 2 October 2025 | India | West Indies | 2–0 [2] | —N/a | —N/a |
| 2 October 2025 | (United Arab Emirates) Afghanistan | Bangladesh | —N/a | 3–0 [3] | 0–3 [3] |
| 11 October 2025 | Namibia | South Africa | —N/a | —N/a | 1–0 [1] |
| 12 October 2025 | Pakistan | South Africa | 1–1 [2] | 2–1 [3] | 2–1 [3] |
| 18 October 2025 | New Zealand | England | —N/a | 3–0 [3] | 0–1 [3] |
| 18 October 2025 | Bangladesh | West Indies | —N/a | 2–1 [3] | 0–3 [3] |
| 19 October 2025 | Australia | India | —N/a | 2–1 [3] | 1–2 [5] |
| 20 October 2025 | Zimbabwe | Afghanistan | 1–0 [1] | —N/a | 0–3 [3] |
| 5 November 2025 | New Zealand | West Indies | 2–0 [3] | 3–0 [3] | 3–1 [5] |
| 11 November 2025 | Bangladesh | Ireland | 2–0 [2] | —N/a | 2–1 [3] |
| 11 November 2025 | Pakistan | Sri Lanka | —N/a | 3–0 [3] | —N/a |
| 11 November 2025 | Qatar | Afghanistan | —N/a | —N/a | 0–1 [1] |
| 14 November 2025 | India | South Africa | 0–2 [2] | 2–1 [3] | 3–1 [5] |
| 21 November 2025 | Australia | England | 4–1 [5] | —N/a | —N/a |
| 7 January 2026 | Sri Lanka | Pakistan | —N/a | —N/a | 1–1 [3] |
| 11 January 2026 | India | New Zealand | —N/a | 1–2 [3] | 4–1 [5] |
| 19 January 2026 | (United Arab Emirates) Afghanistan | West Indies | —N/a | —N/a | 2–1 [3] |
| 22 January 2026 | Sri Lanka | England | —N/a | 1–2 [3] | 0–3 [3] |
| 23 January 2026 | (United Arab Emirates) Ireland | Italy | —N/a | —N/a | 2–1 [3] |
| 27 January 2026 | South Africa | West Indies | —N/a | —N/a | 2–1 [3] |
| 29 January 2026 | Pakistan | Australia | —N/a | —N/a | 3–0 [3] |
| 29 January 2026 | United Arab Emirates | Ireland | —N/a | —N/a | 0–2 [2] |
| 11 March 2026 | Bangladesh | Pakistan | —N/a | 2–1 [3] | —N/a |
| Postponed | (United Arab Emirates) Afghanistan | Sri Lanka | —N/a | [3] | [3] |
| 15 March 2026 | New Zealand | South Africa | —N/a | —N/a | 2–3 [5] |
International tournaments
| Start date | Tournament | | | | Winners |
| 9 September 2025 | (United Arab Emirates) 2025 Asia Cup | | | | India |
| 26 October 2025 | 2025 United Arab Emirates Tri-Nation Series (round 15) | | | | —N/a |
| 18 November 2025 | 2025 Pakistan T20I Tri-Nation Series | | | | Pakistan |
| 12 December 2025 | (United Arab Emirates) 2025 ACC Under-19 Asia Cup | | | | Pakistan |
| 15 January 2026 | (Zimbabwe) (Namibia) 2026 Under-19 Men's Cricket World Cup | | | | India |
| 7 February 2026 | (India) (Sri Lanka) 2026 Men's T20 World Cup | | | | India |

=== Women's events ===
Women's international tours
| Start date | Home team | Away team | Results [Matches] | | |
| Start date | Home team | Away team | WTest | WODI | WT20I |
|---|---|---|---|---|---|
| 14 September 2025 | India | Australia | —N/a | 1–2 [3] | —N/a |
| 16 September 2025 | Pakistan | South Africa | —N/a | 1–2 [3] | —N/a |
| 26 September 2025 | Zimbabwe | United Arab Emirates | —N/a | 2–2 [4] | 0–2 [2] |
| 13 October 2025 | Papua New Guinea | United Arab Emirates | —N/a | 2–2 [4] | —N/a |
| 5 December 2025 | South Africa | Ireland | —N/a | 3–0 [3] | 2–0 [3] |
| 21 December 2025 | India | Sri Lanka | —N/a | —N/a | 5–0 [5] |
| 10 February 2026 | South Africa | Pakistan | —N/a | 2–1 [3] | 2–1 [3] |
| 15 February 2026 | Australia | India | 1–0 [1] | 3–0 [3] | 1–2 [3] |
| 20 February 2026 | West Indies | Sri Lanka | —N/a | 1–2 [3] | 0–2 [3] |
| 25 February 2026 | New Zealand | Zimbabwe | —N/a | 3–0 [3] | 3–0 [3] |
| 15 March 2026 | New Zealand | South Africa | —N/a | 2–1 [3] | 4–1 [5] |
| 19 March 2026 | West Indies | Australia | —N/a | 0–3 [3] | 0–3 [3] |
International tournaments
| Start date | Tournament | | | | Winners |
| 30 September 2025 | (India) (Sri Lanka) 2025 Women's Cricket World Cup | | | | India |
| 18 January 2026 | (Nepal) 2026 Women's T20 World Cup Qualifier | | | | Bangladesh |

== September ==
=== 2025 Asia Cup ===
| Pos | Team | Pld | W | L | NR | Pts | NRR | Qualification |
|---|---|---|---|---|---|---|---|---|
| 1 | India | 3 | 3 | 0 | 0 | 6 | 3.547 | Advanced to the Super Four |
| 2 | Pakistan | 3 | 2 | 1 | 0 | 4 | 1.790 | Advanced to the Super Four |
| 3 | United Arab Emirates (H) | 3 | 1 | 2 | 0 | 2 | −1.984 | |
| 4 | Oman | 3 | 0 | 3 | 0 | 0 | −2.600 | |

Source: ESPNcricinfo
(H) Host

| Pos | Team | Pld | W | L | NR | Pts | NRR | Qualification |
|---|---|---|---|---|---|---|---|---|
| 1 | Sri Lanka | 3 | 3 | 0 | 0 | 6 | 1.278 | Advanced to the Super Four |
| 2 | Bangladesh | 3 | 2 | 1 | 0 | 4 | −0.270 | Advanced to the Super Four |
| 3 | Afghanistan | 3 | 1 | 2 | 0 | 2 | 1.241 | |
| 4 | Hong Kong | 3 | 0 | 3 | 0 | 0 | −2.151 | |

Source: ESPNcricinfo

Group stage
| No. | Date | Team 1 | Team 2 | Venue | Result |
|---|---|---|---|---|---|
| T20I 3443 | 9 September | Afghanistan | Hong Kong | Sheikh Zayed Cricket Stadium, Abu Dhabi | Afghanistan by 94 runs |
| T20I 3444 | 10 September | United Arab Emirates | India | Dubai International Cricket Stadium, Dubai | India by 9 wickets |
| T20I 3446 | 11 September | Bangladesh | Hong Kong | Sheikh Zayed Cricket Stadium, Abu Dhabi | Bangladesh by 7 wickets |
| T20I 3449 | 12 September | Pakistan | Oman | Dubai International Cricket Stadium, Dubai | Pakistan by 93 runs |
| T20I 3453 | 13 September | Bangladesh | Sri Lanka | Sheikh Zayed Cricket Stadium, Abu Dhabi | Sri Lanka by 6 wickets |
| T20I 3455 | 14 September | Pakistan | India | Dubai International Cricket Stadium, Dubai | India by 7 wickets |
| T20I 3457 | 15 September | United Arab Emirates | Oman | Sheikh Zayed Cricket Stadium, Abu Dhabi | United Arab Emirates by 42 runs |
| T20I 3458 | 15 September | Hong Kong | Sri Lanka | Dubai International Cricket Stadium, Dubai | Sri Lanka by 4 wickets |
| T20I 3460 | 16 September | Afghanistan | Bangladesh | Sheikh Zayed Cricket Stadium, Abu Dhabi | Bangladesh by 8 runs |
| T20I 3462 | 17 September | Pakistan | United Arab Emirates | Dubai International Cricket Stadium, Dubai | Pakistan by 41 runs |
| T20I 3464 | 18 September | Afghanistan | Sri Lanka | Sheikh Zayed Cricket Stadium, Abu Dhabi | Sri Lanka by 6 wickets |
| T20I 3465 | 19 September | Oman | India | Sheikh Zayed Cricket Stadium, Abu Dhabi | India by 21 runs |

| Pos | Team | Pld | W | L | NR | Pts | NRR | Qualification |
|---|---|---|---|---|---|---|---|---|
| 1 | India | 3 | 3 | 0 | 0 | 6 | 0.913 | Advanced to the Final |
| 2 | Pakistan | 3 | 2 | 1 | 0 | 4 | 0.329 | Advanced to the Final |
| 3 | Bangladesh | 3 | 1 | 2 | 0 | 2 | −0.831 | |
| 4 | Sri Lanka | 3 | 0 | 3 | 0 | 0 | −0.418 | |

Source: ESPNcricinfo

Super Four
| No. | Date | Team 1 | Team 2 | Venue | Result |
|---|---|---|---|---|---|
| T20I 3466 | 20 September | Bangladesh | Sri Lanka | Dubai International Cricket Stadium, Dubai | Bangladesh by 4 wickets |
| T20I 3468 | 21 September | India | Pakistan | Dubai International Cricket Stadium, Dubai | India by 6 wickets |
| T20I 3469 | 23 September | Pakistan | Sri Lanka | Sheikh Zayed Cricket Stadium, Abu Dhabi | Pakistan by 5 wickets |
| T20I 3470 | 24 September | Bangladesh | India | Dubai International Cricket Stadium, Dubai | India by 41 runs |
| T20I 3471 | 25 September | Bangladesh | Pakistan | Dubai International Cricket Stadium, Dubai | Pakistan by 11 runs |
| T20I 3476 | 26 September | India | Sri Lanka | Dubai International Cricket Stadium, Dubai | Match tied (India won S/O) |
Final
| T20I 3482 | 28 September | India | Pakistan | Dubai International Cricket Stadium, Dubai | India by 5 wickets |

=== Australia women in India ===
WODI series
| No. | Date | Venue | Result |
|---|---|---|---|
| WODI 1477 | 14 September | Maharaja Yadavindra Singh International Cricket Stadium, New Chandigarh | Australia by 8 wickets |
| WODI 1479 | 17 September | Maharaja Yadavindra Singh International Cricket Stadium, New Chandigarh | India by 102 runs |
| WODI 1481 | 20 September | Arun Jaitley Cricket Stadium, New Delhi | Australia by 43 runs |

=== Namibia in Zimbabwe ===
T20I series
| No. | Date | Venue | Result |
|---|---|---|---|
| T20I 3456 | 15 September | Queens Sports Club, Bulawayo | Zimbabwe by 33 runs |
| T20I 3459 | 16 September | Queens Sports Club, Bulawayo | Zimbabwe by 5 wickets |
| T20I 3463 | 18 September | Queens Sports Club, Bulawayo | Namibia by 28 runs |

=== South Africa women in Pakistan ===
WODI series
| No. | Date | Venue | Result |
|---|---|---|---|
| WODI 1478 | 16 September | Gaddafi Stadium, Lahore | South Africa by 8 wickets |
| WODI 1480 | 19 September | Gaddafi Stadium, Lahore | South Africa by 25 runs (DLS) |
| WODI 1482 | 22 September | Gaddafi Stadium, Lahore | Pakistan by 6 wickets |

=== United Arab Emirates women in Zimbabwe ===
WODI series
| No. | Date | Venue | Result |
|---|---|---|---|
| WODI 1483 | 26 September | Queens Sports Club, Bulawayo | United Arab Emirates by 36 runs |
| WODI 1484 | 28 September | Queens Sports Club, Bulawayo | Zimbabwe by 6 wickets |
| WODI 1485 | 30 September | Queens Sports Club, Bulawayo | Zimbabwe by 35 runs |
| WODI 1488 | 2 October | Queens Sports Club, Bulawayo | United Arab Emirates by 45 runs |
WT20I series
| No. | Date | Venue | Result |
| WT20I 2527 | 5 October | Queens Sports Club, Bulawayo | United Arab Emirates by 35 runs |
| WT20I 2528 | 6 October | Queens Sports Club, Bulawayo | United Arab Emirates by 8 runs |

=== West Indies against Nepal in the UAE ===
T20I series
| No. | Date | Venue | Result |
|---|---|---|---|
| T20I 3477 | 27 September | Sharjah Cricket Stadium, Sharjah | Nepal by 19 runs |
| T20I 3483 | 29 September | Sharjah Cricket Stadium, Sharjah | Nepal by 90 runs |
| T20I 3490 | 30 September | Sharjah Cricket Stadium, Sharjah | West Indies by 10 wickets |

=== 2025 Women's Cricket World Cup ===
| Pos | Team | Pld | W | L | NR | Pts | NRR | Qualification |
|---|---|---|---|---|---|---|---|---|
| 1 | Australia | 7 | 6 | 0 | 1 | 13 | 2.102 | Advanced to the knockout stage |
| 2 | England | 7 | 5 | 1 | 1 | 11 | 1.233 | Advanced to the knockout stage |
| 3 | South Africa | 7 | 5 | 2 | 0 | 10 | −0.379 | Advanced to the knockout stage |
| 4 | India (H) | 7 | 3 | 3 | 1 | 7 | 0.628 | Advanced to the knockout stage |
| 5 | Sri Lanka (H) | 7 | 1 | 3 | 3 | 5 | −1.035 | |
| 6 | New Zealand | 7 | 1 | 4 | 2 | 4 | −0.876 | |
| 7 | Bangladesh | 7 | 1 | 5 | 1 | 3 | −0.578 | |
| 8 | Pakistan | 7 | 0 | 4 | 3 | 3 | −2.651 | |

Source: International Cricket Council
ESPN Cricinfo
(H) Host

Group stage
| No. | Date | Team 1 | Team 2 | Venue | Result |
|---|---|---|---|---|---|
| WODI 1486 | 30 September | India | Sri Lanka | Assam Cricket Association Stadium, Guwahati | India by 59 runs (DLS) |
| WODI 1487 | 1 October | Australia | New Zealand | Holkar Stadium, Indore | Australia by 89 runs |
| WODI 1489 | 2 October | Pakistan | Bangladesh | R. Premadasa Stadium, Colombo | Bangladesh by 7 wickets |
| WODI 1490 | 3 October | England | South Africa | Assam Cricket Association Stadium, Guwahati | England by 10 wickets |
| WODI 1490a | 4 October | Sri Lanka | Australia | R. Premadasa Stadium, Colombo | Match abandoned |
| WODI 1491 | 5 October | India | Pakistan | R. Premadasa Stadium, Colombo | India by 88 runs |
| WODI 1492 | 6 October | New Zealand | South Africa | Holkar Stadium, Indore | South Africa by 6 wickets |
| WODI 1493 | 7 October | Bangladesh | England | Assam Cricket Association Stadium, Guwahati | England by 4 wickets |
| WODI 1494 | 8 October | Pakistan | Australia | R. Premadasa Stadium, Colombo | Australia by 107 runs |
| WODI 1495 | 9 October | India | South Africa | ACA–VDCA Cricket Stadium, Visakhapatnam | South Africa by 3 wickets |
| WODI 1496 | 10 October | Bangladesh | New Zealand | Assam Cricket Association Stadium, Guwahati | New Zealand by 100 runs |
| WODI 1497 | 11 October | Sri Lanka | England | R. Premadasa Stadium, Colombo | England by 89 runs |
| WODI 1498 | 12 October | India | Australia | ACA–VDCA Cricket Stadium, Visakhapatnam | Australia by 3 wickets |
| WODI 1500 | 13 October | Bangladesh | South Africa | ACA–VDCA Cricket Stadium, Visakhapatnam | South Africa by 3 wickets |
| WODI 1501 | 14 October | Sri Lanka | New Zealand | R. Premadasa Stadium, Colombo | No result |
| WODI 1503 | 15 October | Pakistan | England | R. Premadasa Stadium, Colombo | No result |
| WODI 1504 | 16 October | Australia | Bangladesh | ACA–VDCA Cricket Stadium, Visakhapatnam | Australia by 10 wickets |
| WODI 1506 | 17 October | Sri Lanka | South Africa | R. Premadasa Stadium, Colombo | South Africa by 10 wickets (DLS) |
| WODI 1507 | 18 October | Pakistan | New Zealand | R. Premadasa Stadium, Colombo | No result |
| WODI 1509 | 19 October | India | England | Holkar Stadium, Indore | England by 4 runs |
| WODI 1510 | 20 October | Bangladesh | Sri Lanka | DY Patil Stadium, Navi Mumbai | Sri Lanka by 7 runs |
| WODI 1511 | 21 October | Pakistan | South Africa | R. Premadasa Stadium, Colombo | South Africa by 150 runs (DLS) |
| WODI 1512 | 22 October | Australia | England | Holkar Stadium, Indore | Australia by 6 wickets |
| WODI 1513 | 23 October | India | New Zealand | DY Patil Stadium, Navi Mumbai | India by 53 runs (DLS) |
| WODI 1514 | 24 October | Pakistan | Sri Lanka | R. Premadasa Stadium, Colombo | No result |
| WODI 1515 | 25 October | Australia | South Africa | Holkar Stadium, Indore | Australia by 7 wickets |
| WODI 1516 | 26 October | England | New Zealand | ACA–VDCA Cricket Stadium, Visakhapatnam | England by 8 wickets |
| WODI 1517 | 26 October | India | Bangladesh | DY Patil Stadium, Navi Mumbai | No result |
Semi-finals
| No. | Date | Team 1 | Team 2 | Venue | Result |
| WODI 1518 | 29 October | England | South Africa | Assam Cricket Association Stadium, Guwahati | South Africa by 125 runs |
| WODI 1519 | 30 October | Australia | India | DY Patil Stadium, Navi Mumbai | India by 5 wickets |
Final
| No. | Date | Team 1 | Team 2 | Venue | Result |
| WODI 1520 | 2 November | India | South Africa | DY Patil Stadium, Navi Mumbai | India by 52 runs |

== October ==
=== Australia in New Zealand ===
T20I series
| No. | Date | Venue | Result |
|---|---|---|---|
| T20I 3491 | 1 October | Bay Oval, Mount Maunganui | Australia by 6 wickets |
| T20I 3497 | 3 October | Bay Oval, Mount Maunganui | No result |
| T20I 3499 | 4 October | Bay Oval, Mount Maunganui | Australia by 3 wickets |

=== West Indies in India ===
2025–2027 ICC World Test Championship – Test series
| No. | Date | Venue | Result |
|---|---|---|---|
| Test 2600 | 2–6 October | Narendra Modi Stadium, Ahmedabad | India by an innings and 140 runs |
| Test 2601 | 10–14 October | Arun Jaitley Cricket Stadium, New Delhi | India by 7 wickets |

=== Bangladesh against Afghanistan in the UAE ===
T20I series
| No. | Date | Venue | Result |
|---|---|---|---|
| T20I 3496 | 2 October | Sharjah Cricket Stadium, Sharjah | Bangladesh by 4 wickets |
| T20I 3498 | 3 October | Sharjah Cricket Stadium, Sharjah | Bangladesh by 2 wickets |
| T20I 3504 | 5 October | Sharjah Cricket Stadium, Sharjah | Bangladesh by 6 wickets |
ODI series
| No. | Date | Venue | Result |
| ODI 4907 | 8 October | Sheikh Zayed Cricket Stadium, Abu Dhabi | Afghanistan by 5 wickets |
| ODI 4908 | 11 October | Sheikh Zayed Cricket Stadium, Abu Dhabi | Afghanistan by 81 runs |
| ODI 4909 | 14 October | Sheikh Zayed Cricket Stadium, Abu Dhabi | Afghanistan by 200 runs |

=== South Africa in Namibia ===
Only T20I
| No. | Date | Venue | Result |
|---|---|---|---|
| T20I 3514 | 11 October | Namibia Cricket Ground, Windhoek | Namibia by 4 wickets |

=== South Africa in Pakistan ===
2025–2027 ICC World Test Championship – Test series
| No. | Date | Venue | Result |
|---|---|---|---|
| Test 2602 | 12–16 October | Gaddafi Stadium, Lahore | Pakistan by 93 runs |
| Test 2603 | 20–24 October | Rawalpindi Cricket Stadium, Rawalpindi | South Africa by 8 wickets |
T20I series
| No. | Date | Venue | Result |
| T20I 3535 | 28 October | Rawalpindi Cricket Stadium, Rawalpindi | South Africa by 55 runs |
| T20I 3546 | 31 October | Gaddafi Stadium, Lahore | Pakistan by 9 wickets |
| T20I 3549 | 1 November | Gaddafi Stadium, Lahore | Pakistan by 4 wickets |
ODI series
| No. | Date | Venue | Result |
| ODI 4924 | 4 November | Iqbal Stadium, Faisalabad | Pakistan by 2 wickets |
| ODI 4926 | 6 November | Iqbal Stadium, Faisalabad | South Africa by 8 wickets |
| ODI 4927 | 8 November | Iqbal Stadium, Faisalabad | Pakistan by 7 wickets |

=== United Arab Emirates women in Papua New Guinea ===
WODI series
| No. | Date | Venue | Result |
|---|---|---|---|
| WODI 1499 | 13 October | Amini Park, Port Moresby | United Arab Emirates by 5 wickets |
| WODI 1502 | 15 October | Amini Park, Port Moresby | Papua New Guinea by 3 wickets |
| WODI 1505 | 17 October | Amini Park, Port Moresby | United Arab Emirates by 160 runs |
| WODI 1508 | 19 October | Amini Park, Port Moresby | Papua New Guinea by 78 runs |

=== England in New Zealand ===
T20I series
| No. | Date | Venue | Result |
|---|---|---|---|
| T20I 3527 | 18 October | Hagley Oval, Christchurch | No result |
| T20I 3532 | 20 October | Hagley Oval, Christchurch | England by 65 runs |
| T20I 3533 | 23 October | Eden Park, Auckland | No result |
ODI series
| No. | Date | Venue | Result |
| ODI 4916 | 26 October | Bay Oval, Mount Maunganui | New Zealand by 4 wickets |
| ODI 4919 | 29 October | Seddon Park, Hamilton | New Zealand by 5 wickets |
| ODI 4921 | 1 November | Wellington Regional Stadium, Wellington | New Zealand by 2 wickets |

=== West Indies in Bangladesh ===
ODI series
| No. | Date | Venue | Result |
|---|---|---|---|
| ODI 4910 | 18 October | Sher-e-Bangla National Cricket Stadium, Dhaka | Bangladesh by 74 runs |
| ODI 4912 | 21 October | Sher-e-Bangla National Cricket Stadium, Dhaka | Match tied (West Indies won S/O) |
| ODI 4914 | 23 October | Sher-e-Bangla National Cricket Stadium, Dhaka | Bangladesh by 179 runs |
T20I series
| No. | Date | Venue | Result |
| T20I 3534 | 27 October | Bir Shrestho Flight Lieutenant Matiur Rahman Cricket Stadium, Chittagong | West Indies by 16 runs |
| T20I 3538 | 29 October | Bir Shrestho Flight Lieutenant Matiur Rahman Cricket Stadium, Chittagong | West Indies by 14 runs |
| T20I 3544 | 31 October | Bir Shrestho Flight Lieutenant Matiur Rahman Cricket Stadium, Chittagong | West Indies by 5 wickets |

=== India in Australia ===
ODI series
| No. | Date | Venue | Result |
|---|---|---|---|
| ODI 4911 | 19 October | Perth Stadium, Perth | Australia by 7 wickets (DLS) |
| ODI 4913 | 23 October | Adelaide Oval, Adelaide | Australia by 2 wickets |
| ODI 4915 | 25 October | Sydney Cricket Ground, Sydney | India by 9 wickets |
T20I series
| No. | Date | Venue | Result |
| T20I 3536 | 29 October | Manuka Oval, Canberra | No result |
| T20I 3541 | 31 October | Melbourne Cricket Ground, Melbourne | Australia by 4 wickets |
| T20I 3551 | 2 November | Bellerive Oval, Hobart | India by 5 wickets |
| T20I 3561 | 6 November | Carrara Stadium, Gold Coast | India by 48 runs |
| T20I 3565 | 8 November | The Gabba, Brisbane | No result |

=== Afghanistan in Zimbabwe ===
Test match
| No. | Date | Venue | Result |
|---|---|---|---|
| Test 2604 | 20–24 October | Harare Sports Club, Harare | Zimbabwe by an innings and 73 runs |
T20I series
| No. | Date | Venue | Result |
| T20I 3537 | 29 October | Harare Sports Club, Harare | Afghanistan by 53 runs |
| T20I 3543 | 31 October | Harare Sports Club, Harare | Afghanistan by 7 wickets |
| T20I 3553 | 2 November | Harare Sports Club, Harare | Afghanistan by 9 runs |

=== 2025 United Arab Emirates Tri-Nation Series (round 15) ===
2024–2026 Cricket World Cup League 2 – Tri-series
| No. | Date | Team 1 | Team 2 | Venue | Result |
|---|---|---|---|---|---|
| ODI 4917 | 26 October | Nepal | United States | Dubai International Cricket Stadium, Dubai | United States by 106 runs |
| ODI 4918 | 28 October | United Arab Emirates | United States | Dubai International Cricket Stadium, Dubai | United States by 4 wickets |
| ODI 4920 | 30 October | United Arab Emirates | Nepal | ICC Academy Ground, Dubai | United Arab Emirates by 5 wickets |
| ODI 4922 | 1 November | Nepal | United States | ICC Academy Ground, Dubai | United States by 4 wickets |
| ODI 4923 | 3 November | United Arab Emirates | United States | Dubai International Cricket Stadium, Dubai | United States by 243 runs |
| ODI 4925 | 5 November | United Arab Emirates | Nepal | ICC Academy Ground, Dubai | United Arab Emirates by 4 wickets |

== November ==
=== West Indies in New Zealand ===
T20I series
| No. | Date | Venue | Result |
|---|---|---|---|
| T20I 3557 | 5 November | Eden Park, Auckland | West Indies by 7 runs |
| T20I 3560 | 6 November | Eden Park, Auckland | New Zealand by 3 runs |
| T20I 3566 | 9 November | Saxton Oval, Nelson | New Zealand by 9 runs |
| T20I 3568 | 10 November | Saxton Oval, Nelson | No result |
| T20I 3574 | 13 November | University of Otago Oval, Dunedin | New Zealand by 8 wickets |
ODI series
| No. | Date | Venue | Result |
| ODI 4930 | 16 November | Hagley Oval, Christchurch | New Zealand by 7 runs |
| ODI 4932 | 19 November | McLean Park, Napier | New Zealand by 5 wickets |
| ODI 4933 | 22 November | Seddon Park, Hamilton | New Zealand by 4 wickets |
2025–2027 ICC World Test Championship – Test series
| No. | Date | Venue | Result |
| Test 2610 | 2–6 December | Hagley Oval, Christchurch | Match drawn |
| Test 2612 | 10–14 December | Basin Reserve, Wellington | New Zealand by 9 wickets |
| Test 2614 | 18–22 December | Bay Oval, Mount Maunganui | New Zealand by 323 runs |

=== Ireland in Bangladesh ===
Test series
| No. | Date | Venue | Result |
|---|---|---|---|
| Test 2605 | 11–15 November | Sylhet International Cricket Stadium, Sylhet | Bangladesh by an innings and 47 runs |
| Test 2607 | 19–23 November | Sher-e-Bangla National Cricket Stadium, Dhaka | Bangladesh by 217 runs |
T20I series
| No. | Date | Venue | Result |
| T20I 3591 | 27 November | Bir Shrestho Flight Lieutenant Matiur Rahman Cricket Stadium, Chittagong | Ireland by 39 runs |
| T20I 3594 | 29 November | Bir Shrestho Flight Lieutenant Matiur Rahman Cricket Stadium, Chittagong | Bangladesh by 4 wickets |
| T20I 3601 | 2 December | Bir Shrestho Flight Lieutenant Matiur Rahman Cricket Stadium, Chattogram | Bangladesh by 8 wickets |

=== Sri Lanka in Pakistan ===
ODI series
| No. | Date | Venue | Result |
|---|---|---|---|
| ODI 4928 | 11 November | Rawalpindi Cricket Stadium, Rawalpindi | Pakistan by 6 runs |
| ODI 4929 | 14 November | Rawalpindi Cricket Stadium, Rawalpindi | Pakistan by 8 wickets |
| ODI 4931 | 16 November | Rawalpindi Cricket Stadium, Rawalpindi | Pakistan by 6 wickets |

=== Afghanistan in Qatar ===
T20I match
| No. | Date | Venue | Result |
|---|---|---|---|
| T20I 3571 | 11 November | West End Park International Cricket Stadium, Doha | Afghanistan by 25 runs |

=== South Africa in India ===
2025–2027 ICC World Test Championship – Test series
| No. | Date | Venue | Result |
|---|---|---|---|
| Test 2606 | 14–18 November | Eden Gardens, Kolkata | South Africa by 30 runs |
| Test 2609 | 22–26 November | Assam Cricket Association Stadium, Guwahati | South Africa by 408 runs |
ODI series
| No. | Date | Venue | Result |
| ODI 4934 | 30 November | JSCA International Stadium Complex, Ranchi | India by 17 runs |
| ODI 4935 | 3 December | Shaheed Veer Narayan Singh International Cricket Stadium, Nava Raipur | South Africa by 4 wickets |
| ODI 4936 | 6 December | ACA–VDCA Cricket Stadium, Visakhapatnam | India by 9 wickets |
T20I series
| No. | Date | Venue | Result |
| T20I 3623 | 9 December | Barabati Stadium, Cuttack | India by 101 runs |
| T20I 3631 | 11 December | Maharaja Yadavindra Singh International Cricket Stadium, New Chandigarh | South Africa by 51 runs |
| T20I 3644 | 14 December | Himachal Pradesh Cricket Association Stadium, Dharamshala | India by 7 wickets |
| T20I 3644a | 17 December | Ekana Cricket Stadium, Lucknow | Match abandoned |
| T20I 3645 | 19 December | Narendra Modi Stadium, Ahmedabad | India by 30 runs |

=== 2025 Pakistan T20I Tri-Nation Series ===
| Pos | Team | Pld | W | L | NR | Pts | NRR | Qualification |
|---|---|---|---|---|---|---|---|---|
| 1 | Pakistan (H) | 4 | 3 | 1 | 0 | 6 | 1.440 | Advanced to the final |
| 2 | Sri Lanka | 4 | 2 | 2 | 0 | 4 | −0.901 | Advanced to the final |
| 3 | Zimbabwe | 4 | 1 | 3 | 0 | 2 | −0.522 | |

Source: ESPNcricinfo
(H) Host

T20I tri-series
| No. | Date | Team 1 | Team 2 | Venue | Result |
|---|---|---|---|---|---|
| T20I 3581 | 18 November | Pakistan | Zimbabwe | Rawalpindi Cricket Stadium, Rawalpindi | Pakistan by 5 wickets |
| T20I 3583 | 20 November | Sri Lanka | Zimbabwe | Rawalpindi Cricket Stadium, Rawalpindi | Zimbabwe by 67 runs |
| T20I 3585 | 22 November | Pakistan | Sri Lanka | Rawalpindi Cricket Stadium, Rawalpindi | Pakistan by 7 wickets |
| T20I 3586 | 23 November | Pakistan | Zimbabwe | Rawalpindi Cricket Stadium, Rawalpindi | Pakistan by 69 runs |
| T20I 3589 | 25 November | Sri Lanka | Zimbabwe | Rawalpindi Cricket Stadium, Rawalpindi | Sri Lanka by 9 wickets |
| T20I 3592 | 27 November | Pakistan | Sri Lanka | Rawalpindi Cricket Stadium, Rawalpindi | Sri Lanka by 6 runs |
Final
| T20I 3596 | 29 November | Pakistan | Sri Lanka | Rawalpindi Cricket Stadium, Rawalpindi | Pakistan by 6 wickets |

=== England in Australia ===
2025–2027 ICC World Test Championship – Test series
| No. | Date | Venue | Result |
|---|---|---|---|
| Test 2608 | 21–25 November | Perth Stadium, Perth | Australia by 8 wickets |
| Test 2611 | 4–8 December | The Gabba, Brisbane | Australia by 8 wickets |
| Test 2613 | 17–21 December | Adelaide Oval, Adelaide | Australia by 82 runs |
| Test 2615 | 26–30 December | Melbourne Cricket Ground, Melbourne | England by 4 wickets |
| Test 2616 | 4–8 January | Sydney Cricket Ground, Sydney | Australia by 5 wickets |

== December ==
=== Ireland women in South Africa ===
WT20I series
| No. | Date | Venue | Result |
|---|---|---|---|
| WT20I 2587 | 5 December | Newlands Cricket Ground, Cape Town | South Africa by 105 runs |
| WT20I 2590 | 7 December | Boland Park, Paarl | South Africa by 65 runs |
| WT20I 2592a | 10 December | Willowmoore Park, Benoni | Match abandoned |
WODI series
| No. | Date | Venue | Result |
| WODI 1521 | 13 December | Buffalo Park, East London | South Africa by 7 wickets |
| WODI 1522 | 16 December | St George's Park, Gqeberha | South Africa by 74 runs |
| WODI 1523 | 19 December | Wanderers Stadium, Johannesburg | South Africa by 6 wickets |

=== Sri Lanka women in India ===
WT20I series
| No. | Date | Venue | Result |
|---|---|---|---|
| WT20I 2619 | 21 December | ACA–VDCA Cricket Stadium, Visakhapatnam | India by 8 wickets |
| WT20I 2620 | 23 December | ACA–VDCA Cricket Stadium, Visakhapatnam | India by 7 wickets |
| WT20I 2621 | 26 December | Greenfield International Stadium, Thiruvananthapuram | India by 8 wickets |
| WT20I 2622 | 28 December | Greenfield International Stadium, Thiruvananthapuram | India by 30 runs |
| WT20I 2623 | 30 December | Greenfield International Stadium, Thiruvananthapuram | India by 15 runs |

== January ==
=== Pakistan in Sri Lanka ===
T20I series
| No. | Date | Venue | Result |
|---|---|---|---|
| T20I 3660 | 7 January | Rangiri Dambulla International Stadium, Dambulla | Pakistan by 6 wickets |
| T20I 3660a | 9 January | Rangiri Dambulla International Stadium, Dambulla | Match abandoned |
| T20I 3661 | 11 January | Rangiri Dambulla International Stadium, Dambulla | Sri Lanka by 14 runs |

=== New Zealand in India ===
ODI series
| No. | Date | Venue | Result |
|---|---|---|---|
| ODI 4937 | 11 January | Baroda Cricket Association Stadium, Vadodara | India by 4 wickets |
| ODI 4938 | 14 January | Niranjan Shah Stadium, Rajkot | New Zealand by 7 wickets |
| ODI 4939 | 18 January | Holkar Stadium, Indore | New Zealand by 41 runs |
T20I series
| No. | Date | Venue | Result |
| T20I 3663 | 21 January | Vidarbha Cricket Association Stadium, Nagpur | India by 48 runs |
| T20I 3667 | 23 January | Shaheed Veer Narayan Singh International Cricket Stadium, Nava Raipur | India by 7 wickets |
| T20I 3669 | 25 January | Assam Cricket Association Stadium, Guwahati | India by 8 wickets |
| T20I 3672 | 28 January | ACA–VDCA Cricket Stadium, Visakhapatnam | New Zealand by 50 runs |
| T20I 3679 | 31 January | Greenfield International Stadium, Thiruvananthapuram | India by 46 runs |

=== 2026 Women's T20 World Cup Qualifier ===
Group A standings
| Pos | Team | Pld | W | L | NR | Pts | NRR | Qualification |
|---|---|---|---|---|---|---|---|---|
| 1 | Bangladesh | 4 | 4 | 0 | 0 | 8 | 1.750 | Advanced to the Super 6 stage |
| 2 | Ireland | 4 | 3 | 1 | 0 | 6 | 1.165 | Advanced to the Super 6 stage |
| 3 | United States | 4 | 2 | 2 | 0 | 4 | −0.209 | Advanced to the Super 6 stage |
| 4 | Papua New Guinea | 4 | 1 | 3 | 0 | 2 | −1.025 | Eliminated |
| 5 | Namibia | 4 | 0 | 4 | 0 | 0 | −1.669 | Eliminated |

Source: ESPNcricinfo

Group B standings
| Pos | Team | Pld | W | L | NR | Pts | NRR | Qualification |
|---|---|---|---|---|---|---|---|---|
| 1 | Netherlands | 4 | 4 | 0 | 0 | 8 | 0.600 | Advanced to the Super 6 stage |
| 2 | Scotland | 4 | 3 | 1 | 0 | 6 | 2.045 | Advanced to the Super 6 stage |
| 3 | Thailand | 4 | 2 | 2 | 0 | 4 | −0.424 | Advanced to the Super 6 stage |
| 4 | Nepal (H) | 4 | 1 | 3 | 0 | 2 | −1.151 | Eliminated |
| 5 | Zimbabwe | 4 | 0 | 4 | 0 | 0 | −0.942 | Eliminated |

Source: ESPNcricinfo
(H) Hosts

Group stage
| No. | Date | Team 1 | Team 2 | Venue | Result |
|---|---|---|---|---|---|
| WT20I 2624 | 18 January | Nepal | Thailand | Tribhuvan University International Cricket Ground, Kirtipur | Thailand by 8 wickets |
| WT20I 2625 | 18 January | Bangladesh | United States | Mulpani International Cricket Ground, Kageshwari-Manohara | Bangladesh by 21 runs |
| WT20I 2626 | 18 January | Netherlands | Zimbabwe | Tribhuvan University International Cricket Ground, Kirtipur | Netherlands by 22 runs |
| WT20I 2627 | 18 January | Ireland | Papua New Guinea | Mulpani International Cricket Ground, Kageshwari-Manohara | Ireland by 41 runs |
| WT20I 2628 | 20 January | Bangladesh | Papua New Guinea | Tribhuvan University International Cricket Ground, Kirtipur | Bangladesh by 30 runs |
| WT20I 2629 | 20 January | Thailand | Zimbabwe | Mulpani International Cricket Ground, Kageshwari-Manohara | Thailand by 1 run |
| WT20I 2631 | 20 January | Netherlands | Scotland | Tribhuvan University International Cricket Ground, Kirtipur | Netherlands by 7 runs |
| WT20I 2632 | 20 January | Namibia | United States | Mulpani International Cricket Ground, Kageshwari-Manohara | United States by 4 wickets |
| WT20I 2634 | 22 January | Nepal | Netherlands | Tribhuvan University International Cricket Ground, Kirtipur | Netherlands by 2 runs |
| WT20I 2635 | 22 January | Ireland | United States | Mulpani International Cricket Ground, Kageshwari-Manohara | Ireland by 16 runs |
| WT20I 2637 | 22 January | Bangladesh | Namibia | Tribhuvan University International Cricket Ground, Kirtipur | Bangladesh by 80 runs |
| WT20I 2638 | 22 January | Scotland | Zimbabwe | Mulpani International Cricket Ground, Kageshwari-Manohara | Scotland by 5 wickets |
| WT20I 2639 | 24 January | Scotland | Thailand | Tribhuvan University International Cricket Ground, Kirtipur | Scotland by 5 wickets |
| WT20I 2640 | 24 January | Namibia | Papua New Guinea | Mulpani International Cricket Ground, Kageshwari-Manohara | Papua New Guinea by 3 wickets |
| WT20I 2642 | 24 January | Nepal | Zimbabwe | Tribhuvan University International Cricket Ground, Kirtipur | Nepal by 6 wickets |
| WT20I 2643 | 24 January | Bangladesh | Ireland | Mulpani International Cricket Ground, Kageshwari-Manohara | Bangladesh by 9 runs |
| WT20I 2645 | 26 January | Nepal | Scotland | Tribhuvan University International Cricket Ground, Kirtipur | Scotland by 72 runs |
| WT20I 2646 | 26 January | Papua New Guinea | United States | Mulpani International Cricket Ground, Kageshwari-Manohara | United States by 5 wickets |
| WT20I 2648 | 26 January | Ireland | Namibia | Tribhuvan University International Cricket Ground, Kirtipur | Ireland by 8 wickets |
| WT20I 2649 | 26 January | Netherlands | Thailand | Mulpani International Cricket Ground, Kageshwari-Manohara | Netherlands by 17 runs |

Super 6 stage standings
| Pos | Team | Pld | W | L | NR | Pts | NRR | Qualification |
|---|---|---|---|---|---|---|---|---|
| 1 | Bangladesh | 5 | 5 | 0 | 0 | 10 | 1.886 | Qualified for the 2026 Women's T20 World Cup |
| 2 | Ireland | 5 | 3 | 2 | 0 | 6 | 1.280 | Qualified for the 2026 Women's T20 World Cup |
| 3 | Scotland | 5 | 3 | 2 | 0 | 6 | 0.292 | Qualified for the 2026 Women's T20 World Cup |
| 4 | Netherlands | 5 | 3 | 2 | 0 | 6 | −0.836 | Qualified for the 2026 Women's T20 World Cup |
| 5 | United States | 5 | 1 | 4 | 0 | 2 | −0.772 | Eliminated |
| 6 | Thailand | 5 | 0 | 5 | 0 | 0 | −1.883 | Eliminated |

Source: ESPNcricinfo

Super Six
| No. | Date | Team 1 | Team 2 | Venue | Result |
|---|---|---|---|---|---|
| WT20I 2651 | 28 January | Ireland | Scotland | Tribhuvan University International Cricket Ground, Kirtipur | Scotland by 39 runs |
| WT20I 2652 | 28 January | Bangladesh | Thailand | Mulpani International Cricket Ground, Kageshwari-Manohara | Bangladesh by 39 runs |
| WT20I 2653 | 28 January | Netherlands | United States | Tribhuvan University International Cricket Ground, Kirtipur | Netherlands by 21 runs (DLS method) |
| WT20I 2655 | 30 January | Bangladesh | Scotland | Tribhuvan University International Cricket Ground, Kirtipur | Bangladesh by 90 runs |
| WT20I 2656 | 30 January | Ireland | Netherlands | Mulpani International Cricket Ground, Kageshwari-Manohara | Ireland by 98 runs |
| WT20I 2657 | 30 January | Thailand | United States | Mulpani International Cricket Ground, Kageshwari-Manohara | United States by 28 runs |
| WT20I 2658 | 1 February | Ireland | Thailand | Tribhuvan University International Cricket Ground, Kirtipur | Ireland by 62 runs |
| WT20I 2659 | 1 February | Bangladesh | Netherlands | Mulpani International Cricket Ground, Kageshwari-Manohara | Bangladesh by 7 wickets |
| WT20I 2660 | 1 February | Scotland | United States | Tribhuvan University International Cricket Ground, Kirtipur | Scotland by 41 runs |

=== West Indies against Afghanistan in the UAE ===
T20I series
| No. | Date | Venue | Result |
|---|---|---|---|
| T20I 3662 | 19 January | Dubai International Cricket Stadium, Dubai | Afghanistan by 38 runs |
| T20I 3664 | 21 January | Dubai International Cricket Stadium, Dubai | Afghanistan by 39 runs |
| T20I 3665 | 22 January | Dubai International Cricket Stadium, Dubai | West Indies by 15 runs |

=== England in Sri Lanka ===
ODI series
| No. | Date | Venue | Result |
|---|---|---|---|
| ODI 4940 | 22 January | R. Premadasa Stadium, Colombo | Sri Lanka by 19 runs |
| ODI 4941 | 24 January | R. Premadasa Stadium, Colombo | England by 5 wickets |
| ODI 4942 | 27 January | R. Premadasa Stadium, Colombo | England by 53 runs |
T20I series
| No. | Date | Venue | Result |
| T20I 3676 | 30 January | Pallekele International Cricket Stadium, Kandy | England by 11 runs (DLS) |
| T20I 3682 | 1 February | Pallekele International Cricket Stadium, Kandy | England by 6 wickets (DLS) |
| T20I 3683 | 3 February | Pallekele International Cricket Stadium, Kandy | England by 12 runs |

=== Ireland against Italy in the UAE ===
T20I series
| No. | Date | Venue | Result |
|---|---|---|---|
| T20I 3666 | 23 January | The Sevens Stadium, Dubai | Ireland by 3 wickets |
| T20I 3668 | 25 January | The Sevens Stadium, Dubai | Ireland by 24 runs |
| T20I 3670 | 26 January | The Sevens Stadium, Dubai | Italy by 4 wickets |

=== West Indies in South Africa ===
T20I series
| No. | Date | Venue | Result |
|---|---|---|---|
| T20I 3671 | 27 January | Boland Park, Paarl | South Africa by 9 wickets |
| T20I 3675 | 29 January | Centurion Park, Centurion | South Africa by 7 wickets |
| T20I 3680 | 31 January | Wanderers Stadium, Johannesburg | West Indies by 6 runs (DLS) |

=== Australia in Pakistan ===
T20I series
| No. | Date | Venue | Result |
|---|---|---|---|
| T20I 3673 | 29 January | Gaddafi Stadium, Lahore | Pakistan by 22 runs |
| T20I 3678 | 31 January | Gaddafi Stadium, Lahore | Pakistan by 90 runs |
| T20I 3681 | 1 February | Gaddafi Stadium, Lahore | Pakistan by 111 runs |

=== Ireland in the UAE ===
T20I series
| No. | Date | Venue | Result |
|---|---|---|---|
| T20I 3674 | 29 January | Dubai International Cricket Stadium, Dubai | Ireland by 57 runs |
| T20I 3677 | 31 January | Dubai International Cricket Stadium, Dubai | Ireland by 30 runs |

== February ==
=== 2026 Men's T20 World Cup ===
Group stage

Group A standings
| Pos | Team | Pld | W | L | NR | Pts | NRR | Qualification |
|---|---|---|---|---|---|---|---|---|
| 1 | India (H) | 4 | 4 | 0 | 0 | 8 | 2.500 | Advanced to the Super 8 stage |
| 2 | Pakistan | 4 | 3 | 1 | 0 | 6 | 0.976 | Advanced to the Super 8 stage |
| 3 | United States | 4 | 2 | 2 | 0 | 4 | 0.788 | Eliminated |
| 4 | Netherlands | 4 | 1 | 3 | 0 | 2 | −1.217 | Eliminated |
| 5 | Namibia | 4 | 0 | 4 | 0 | 0 | −3.108 | Eliminated |

Source: ESPNcricinfo
Rules for classification: 1) Points; 2) Wins; 3) Net run rate; 4) Results of games between tied teams; 5) T20I Rankings ahead of the tournament
(H) Hosts

Group B standings
| Pos | Team | Pld | W | L | NR | Pts | NRR | Qualification |
|---|---|---|---|---|---|---|---|---|
| 1 | Zimbabwe | 4 | 3 | 0 | 1 | 7 | 1.506 | Advanced to the Super 8 stage |
| 2 | Sri Lanka (H) | 4 | 3 | 1 | 0 | 6 | 1.741 | Advanced to the Super 8 stage |
| 3 | Australia | 4 | 2 | 2 | 0 | 4 | 1.523 | Eliminated |
| 4 | Ireland | 4 | 1 | 2 | 1 | 3 | 0.150 | Eliminated |
| 5 | Oman | 4 | 0 | 4 | 0 | 0 | −4.845 | Eliminated |

Source: ESPNcricinfo
Rules for classification: 1) Points; 2) Wins; 3) Net run rate; 4) Results of games between tied teams; 5) T20I Rankings ahead of the tournament
(H) Hosts

Group C standings
| Pos | Team | Pld | W | L | NR | Pts | NRR | Qualification |
|---|---|---|---|---|---|---|---|---|
| 1 | West Indies | 4 | 4 | 0 | 0 | 8 | 1.874 | Advanced to the Super 8 stage |
| 2 | England | 4 | 3 | 1 | 0 | 6 | 0.201 | Advanced to the Super 8 stage |
| 3 | Scotland | 4 | 1 | 3 | 0 | 2 | 0.184 | Eliminated |
| 4 | Italy | 4 | 1 | 3 | 0 | 2 | −1.020 | Eliminated |
| 5 | Nepal | 4 | 1 | 3 | 0 | 2 | −1.349 | Eliminated |

Source: ESPNcricinfo
Rules for classification: 1) Points; 2) Wins; 3) Net run rate; 4) Results of games between tied teams; 5) T20I Rankings ahead of the tournament

Group D standings
| Pos | Team | Pld | W | L | NR | Pts | NRR | Qualification |
|---|---|---|---|---|---|---|---|---|
| 1 | South Africa | 4 | 4 | 0 | 0 | 8 | 1.943 | Advanced to the Super 8 stage |
| 2 | New Zealand | 4 | 3 | 1 | 0 | 6 | 1.227 | Advanced to the Super 8 stage |
| 3 | Afghanistan | 4 | 2 | 2 | 0 | 4 | 0.889 | Eliminated |
| 4 | United Arab Emirates | 4 | 1 | 3 | 0 | 2 | −1.364 | Eliminated |
| 5 | Canada | 4 | 0 | 4 | 0 | 0 | −2.426 | Eliminated |

Source: ESPNcricinfo
Rules for classification: 1) Points; 2) Wins; 3) Net run rate; 4) Results of games between tied teams; 5) T20I Rankings ahead of the tournament

Group stage
| No. | Date | Team 1 | Team 2 | Venue | Result |
|---|---|---|---|---|---|
| T20I 3684 | 7 February | Netherlands | Pakistan | Sinhalese Sports Club Cricket Ground, Colombo | Pakistan by 3 wickets |
| T20I 3685 | 7 February | Scotland | West Indies | Eden Gardens, Kolkata | West Indies by 35 runs |
| T20I 3686 | 7 February | India | United States | Wankhede Stadium, Mumbai | India by 29 runs |
| T20I 3687 | 8 February | Afghanistan | New Zealand | M. A. Chidambaram Stadium, Chennai | New Zealand by 5 wickets |
| T20I 3688 | 8 February | England | Nepal | Wankhede Stadium, Mumbai | England by 4 runs |
| T20I 3689 | 8 February | Sri Lanka | Ireland | R. Premadasa Stadium, Colombo | Sri Lanka by 20 runs |
| T20I 3690 | 9 February | Italy | Scotland | Eden Gardens, Kolkata | Scotland by 73 runs |
| T20I 3691 | 9 February | Oman | Zimbabwe | Sinhalese Sports Club Cricket Ground, Colombo | Zimbabwe by 8 wickets |
| T20I 3692 | 9 February | Canada | South Africa | Narendra Modi Stadium, Ahmedabad | South Africa by 57 runs |
| T20I 3693 | 10 February | Namibia | Netherlands | Arun Jaitley Cricket Stadium, New Delhi | Netherlands by 7 wickets |
| T20I 3694 | 10 February | New Zealand | United Arab Emirates | M. A. Chidambaram Stadium, Chennai | New Zealand by 10 wickets |
| T20I 3696 | 10 February | Pakistan | United States | Sinhalese Sports Club Cricket Ground, Colombo | Pakistan by 32 runs |
| T20I 3697 | 11 February | Afghanistan | South Africa | Narendra Modi Stadium, Ahmedabad | Match tied (South Africa won second S/O) |
| T20I 3698 | 11 February | Australia | Ireland | R. Premadasa Stadium, Colombo | Australia by 67 runs |
| T20I 3700 | 11 February | England | West Indies | Wankhede Stadium, Mumbai | West Indies by 30 runs |
| T20I 3701 | 12 February | Sri Lanka | Oman | Pallekele International Cricket Stadium, Kandy | Sri Lanka by 105 runs |
| T20I 3702 | 12 February | Italy | Nepal | Wankhede Stadium, Mumbai | Italy by 10 wickets |
| T20I 3703 | 12 February | India | Namibia | Arun Jaitley Cricket Stadium, New Delhi | India by 93 runs |
| T20I 3704 | 13 February | Australia | Zimbabwe | R. Premadasa Stadium, Colombo | Zimbabwe by 23 runs |
| T20I 3705 | 13 February | Canada | United Arab Emirates | Arun Jaitley Cricket Stadium, New Delhi | United Arab Emirates by 5 wickets |
| T20I 3707 | 13 February | Netherlands | United States | M. A. Chidambaram Stadium, Chennai | United States by 93 runs |
| T20I 3708 | 14 February | Ireland | Oman | Sinhalese Sports Club Cricket Ground, Colombo | Ireland by 96 runs |
| T20I 3709 | 14 February | England | Scotland | Eden Gardens, Kolkata | England by 5 wickets |
| T20I 3711 | 14 February | New Zealand | South Africa | Narendra Modi Stadium, Ahmedabad | South Africa by 7 wickets |
| T20I 3712 | 15 February | Nepal | West Indies | Wankhede Stadium, Mumbai | West Indies by 9 wickets |
| T20I 3713 | 15 February | Namibia | United States | M. A. Chidambaram Stadium, Chennai | United States by 31 runs |
| T20I 3715 | 15 February | India | Pakistan | R. Premadasa Stadium, Colombo | India by 61 runs |
| T20I 3716 | 16 February | Afghanistan | United Arab Emirates | Arun Jaitley Cricket Stadium, New Delhi | Afghanistan by 5 wickets |
| T20I 3717 | 16 February | England | Italy | Eden Gardens, Kolkata | England by 24 runs |
| T20I 3718 | 16 February | Sri Lanka | Australia | Pallekele International Cricket Stadium, Kandy | Sri Lanka by 8 wickets |
| T20I 3719 | 17 February | Canada | New Zealand | M. A. Chidambaram Stadium, Chennai | New Zealand by 8 wickets |
| T20I 3719a | 17 February | Ireland | Zimbabwe | Pallekele International Cricket Stadium, Kandy | Match abandoned |
| T20I 3720 | 17 February | Nepal | Scotland | Wankhede Stadium, Mumbai | Nepal by 7 wickets |
| T20I 3721 | 18 February | South Africa | United Arab Emirates | Arun Jaitley Cricket Stadium, New Delhi | South Africa by 6 wickets |
| T20I 3722 | 18 February | Pakistan | Namibia | Sinhalese Sports Club Cricket Ground, Colombo | Pakistan by 102 runs |
| T20I 3723 | 18 February | India | Netherlands | Narendra Modi Stadium, Ahmedabad | India by 17 runs |
| T20I 3724 | 19 February | Italy | West Indies | Eden Gardens, Kolkata | West Indies by 42 runs |
| T20I 3725 | 19 February | Sri Lanka | Zimbabwe | R. Premadasa Stadium, Colombo | Zimbabwe by 6 wickets |
| T20I 3726 | 19 February | Afghanistan | Canada | M. A. Chidambaram Stadium, Chennai | Afghanistan by 82 runs |
| T20I 3727 | 20 February | Australia | Oman | Pallekele International Cricket Stadium, Kandy | Australia by 9 wickets |

Super 8

Group 1 standings
| Pos | Team | Pld | W | L | NR | Pts | NRR | Qualification |
|---|---|---|---|---|---|---|---|---|
| 1 | South Africa | 3 | 3 | 0 | 0 | 6 | 2.259 | Advanced to the knockout stage |
| 2 | India (H) | 3 | 2 | 1 | 0 | 4 | 0.106 | Advanced to the knockout stage |
| 3 | West Indies | 3 | 1 | 2 | 0 | 2 | 0.993 | Eliminated |
| 4 | Zimbabwe | 3 | 0 | 3 | 0 | 0 | −3.415 | Eliminated |

Source: ESPNcricinfo
Rules for classification: 1) Points; 2) Wins; 3) Net run rate; 4) Results of games between tied teams; 5) T20I Rankings ahead of the tournament
(H) Hosts

Group 2 standings
| Pos | Team | Pld | W | L | NR | Pts | NRR | Qualification |
|---|---|---|---|---|---|---|---|---|
| 1 | England | 3 | 3 | 0 | 0 | 6 | 1.096 | Advanced to the knockout stage |
| 2 | New Zealand | 3 | 1 | 1 | 1 | 3 | 1.390 | Advanced to the knockout stage |
| 3 | Pakistan | 3 | 1 | 1 | 1 | 3 | −0.123 | Eliminated |
| 4 | Sri Lanka (H) | 3 | 0 | 3 | 0 | 0 | −1.950 | Eliminated |

Source: ESPNcricinfo
Rules for classification: 1) Points; 2) Wins; 3) Net run rate; 4) Results of games between tied teams; 5) T20I Rankings ahead of the tournament
(H) Hosts

Super 8
| No. | Date | Team 1 | Team 2 | Venue | Result |
|---|---|---|---|---|---|
| T20I 3728 | 21 February | New Zealand | Pakistan | R. Premadasa Stadium, Colombo | No result |
| T20I 3729 | 22 February | Sri Lanka | England | Pallekele International Cricket Stadium, Kandy | England by 51 runs |
| T20I 3730 | 22 February | India | South Africa | Narendra Modi Stadium, Ahmedabad | South Africa by 76 runs |
| T20I 3731 | 23 February | West Indies | Zimbabwe | Wankhede Stadium, Mumbai | West Indies by 107 runs |
| T20I 3732 | 24 February | England | Pakistan | Pallekele International Cricket Stadium, Kandy | England by 2 wickets |
| T20I 3736 | 25 February | Sri Lanka | New Zealand | R. Premadasa Stadium, Colombo | New Zealand by 61 runs |
| T20I 3740 | 26 February | South Africa | West Indies | Narendra Modi Stadium, Ahmedabad | South Africa by 9 wickets |
| T20I 3741 | 26 February | India | Zimbabwe | M. A. Chidambaram Stadium, Chennai | India by 72 runs |
| T20I 3744 | 27 February | England | New Zealand | R. Premadasa Stadium, Colombo | England by 4 wickets |
| T20I 3747 | 28 February | Sri Lanka | Pakistan | Pallekele International Cricket Stadium, Kandy | Pakistan by 5 runs |
| T20I 3749 | 1 March | South Africa | Zimbabwe | Arun Jaitley Cricket Stadium, New Delhi | South Africa by 5 wickets |
| T20I 3750 | 1 March | India | West Indies | Eden Gardens, Kolkata | India by 5 wickets |

Knockout stage

Semi-finals
| No. | Date | Team 1 | Team 2 | Venue | Result |
|---|---|---|---|---|---|
| T20I 3751 | 4 March | New Zealand | South Africa | Eden Gardens, Kolkata | New Zealand by 9 wickets |
| T20I 3752 | 5 March | India | England | Wankhede Stadium, Mumbai | India by 7 runs |
2026 Men's T20 World Cup final
| No. | Date | Team 1 | Team 2 | Venue | Result |
| T20I 3755 | 8 March | India | New Zealand | Narendra Modi Stadium, Ahmedabad | India by 96 runs |

=== Pakistan women in South Africa ===
WT20I series
| No. | Date | Venue | Result |
|---|---|---|---|
| WT20I 2667 | 10 February | JB Marks Oval, Potchefstroom | South Africa by 5 wickets |
| WT20I 2670 | 13 February | Willowmoore Park, Benoni | South Africa by 6 wickets |
| WT20I 2674 | 16 February | Willowmoore Park, Benoni | Pakistan by 53 runs |
2025–2029 ICC Women's Championship — WODI series
| No. | Date | Venue | Result |
| WODI 1525 | 22 February | Mangaung Oval, Bloemfontein | South Africa by 37 runs |
| WODI 1528 | 25 February | Centurion Park, Centurion | South Africa by 16 runs |
| WODI 1532 | 1 March | Kingsmead, Durban | Pakistan by 119 runs |

=== India women in Australia ===
WT20I series
| No. | Date | Venue | Result |
|---|---|---|---|
| WT20I 2673 | 15 February | Sydney Cricket Ground, Sydney | India by 21 runs (DLS) |
| WT20I 2675 | 19 February | Manuka Oval, Canberra | Australia by 19 runs |
| WT20I 2676 | 21 February | Adelaide Oval, Adelaide | India by 17 runs |
WODI series
| No. | Date | Venue | Result |
| WODI 1527 | 24 February | Allan Border Field, Brisbane | Australia by 6 wickets |
| WODI 1530 | 27 February | Bellerive Oval, Hobart | Australia by 5 wickets |
| WODI 1531 | 1 March | Bellerive Oval, Hobart | Australia by 185 runs |
Only WTest
| No. | Date | Venue | Result |
| WTest 152 | 6–9 March | WACA Ground, Perth | Australia by 10 wickets |

=== Sri Lanka women in the West Indies ===
2025–2029 ICC Women's Championship — WODI series
| No. | Date | Venue | Result |
|---|---|---|---|
| WODI 1524 | 20 February | National Cricket Stadium, St. George's | Sri Lanka by 10 runs |
| WODI 1526 | 22 February | National Cricket Stadium, St. George's | Sri Lanka by 14 runs |
| WODI 1529 | 25 February | National Cricket Stadium, St. George's | West Indies by 6 wickets |
WT20I series
| No. | Date | Venue | Result |
| WT20I 2679 | 28 February | National Cricket Stadium, St. George's | No result |
| WT20I 2681 | 1 March | National Cricket Stadium, St. George's | Sri Lanka by 4 wickets |
| WT20I 2682 | 3 March | National Cricket Stadium, St. George's | Sri Lanka by 9 wickets |

=== Zimbabwe women in New Zealand ===
WT20I series
| No. | Date | Venue | Result |
|---|---|---|---|
| WT20I 2677 | 25 February | Seddon Park, Hamilton | New Zealand by 92 runs |
| WT20I 2678 | 27 February | Seddon Park, Hamilton | New Zealand by 110 runs |
| WT20I 2680 | 1 March | Seddon Park, Hamilton | New Zealand by 10 wickets |
2025–2029 ICC Women's Championship — WODI series
| No. | Date | Venue | Result |
| WODI 1533 | 5 March | University of Otago Oval, Dunedin | New Zealand by 180 runs |
| WODI 1534 | 8 March | University of Otago Oval, Dunedin | New Zealand by 8 wickets |
| WODI 1535 | 11 March | University of Otago Oval, Dunedin | New Zealand by 200 runs |

== March ==
=== Pakistan in Bangladesh ===
ODI series
| No. | Date | Venue | Result |
|---|---|---|---|
| ODI 4944 | 11 March | Sher-e-Bangla National Cricket Stadium, Dhaka | Bangladesh by 8 wickets |
| ODI 4946 | 13 March | Sher-e-Bangla National Cricket Stadium, Dhaka | Pakistan by 128 runs (DLS) |
| ODI 4948 | 15 March | Sher-e-Bangla National Cricket Stadium, Dhaka | Bangladesh by 11 runs |

=== Sri Lanka against Afghanistan in the UAE ===
T20I series
| No. | Date | Venue | Result |
|---|---|---|---|
| 1st T20I | TBD | Sharjah Cricket Stadium, Sharjah | |
| 2nd T20I | TBD | Sharjah Cricket Stadium, Sharjah | |
| 3rd T20I | TBD | Sharjah Cricket Stadium, Sharjah | |
ODI series
| No. | Date | Venue | Result |
| 1st ODI | TBD | Dubai International Cricket Stadium, Dubai | |
| 2nd ODI | TBD | Dubai International Cricket Stadium, Dubai | |
| 3rd ODI | TBD | Dubai International Cricket Stadium, Dubai | |

=== South Africa women in New Zealand ===
WT20I series
| No. | Date | Venue | Result |
|---|---|---|---|
| WT20I 2683 | 15 March | Bay Oval, Mount Maunganui | New Zealand by 80 runs |
| WT20I 2684 | 17 March | Seddon Park, Hamilton | South Africa by 18 runs |
| WT20I 2686 | 20 March | Eden Park, Auckland | New Zealand by 6 wickets |
| WT20I 2689 | 22 March | Wellington Regional Stadium, Wellington | New Zealand by 6 wickets |
| WT20I 2693 | 25 March | Hagley Oval, Christchurch | New Zealand by 92 runs |
2025–2029 ICC Women's Championship — WODI series
| No. | Date | Venue | Result |
| WODI 1537 | 29 March | Hagley Oval, Christchurch | South Africa by 2 wickets |
| WODI 1539 | 1 April | Basin Reserve, Wellington | New Zealand by 2 wickets |
| WODI 1541 | 4 April | Basin Reserve, Wellington | New Zealand by 66 runs |

=== South Africa in New Zealand ===
T20I series
| No. | Date | Venue | Result |
|---|---|---|---|
| T20I 3772 | 15 March | Bay Oval, Mount Maunganui | South Africa by 7 wickets |
| T20I 3777 | 17 March | Seddon Park, Hamilton | New Zealand by 68 runs |
| T20I 3778 | 20 March | Eden Park, Auckland | New Zealand by 8 wickets |
| T20I 3779 | 22 March | Wellington Regional Stadium, Wellington | South Africa by 19 runs |
| T20I 3783 | 25 March | Hagley Oval, Christchurch | South Africa by 33 runs |

=== Australia women in the West Indies ===
WT20I series
| No. | Date | Venue | Result |
|---|---|---|---|
| WT20I 2685 | 19 March | Arnos Vale Stadium, Arnos Vale | Australia by 43 runs |
| WT20I 2688 | 21 March | Arnos Vale Stadium, Arnos Vale | Australia by 17 runs |
| WT20I 2691 | 23 March | Arnos Vale Stadium, Arnos Vale | Australia by 40 runs (DLS) |
2025–2029 ICC Women's Championship — WODI series
| No. | Date | Venue | Result |
| WODI 1536 | 27 March | Warner Park Sporting Complex, Basseterre | Australia by 103 runs |
| WODI 1538 | 29 March | Warner Park Sporting Complex, Basseterre | Australia by 90 runs |
| WODI 1540 | 2 April | Warner Park Sporting Complex, Basseterre | Australia by 9 wickets |

== See also ==
- Associate international cricket in 2025–26
- International cricket in 2025
- International cricket in 2026
