= Associate international cricket in 2025–26 =

International cricket season

The 2025–26 Associate international cricket season included series starting from approximately late September 2025 to March 2026. All official 20-over matches between associate members of the ICC were eligible to have full men's Twenty20 International or women's Twenty20 International (T20I) status, as the International Cricket Council (ICC) granted T20I status to matches between all of its members from 1 July 2018 (women's teams) and 1 January 2019 (men's teams). The season included all T20I cricket series mostly involving ICC Associate members, that were played in addition to series covered in International cricket in 2025–26.

== Season overview ==
=== Men's events ===
International tours
Start date	Home team	Away team	Results [Matches]
Start date	Home team	Away team	T20I
29 September 2025	Oman	Kuwait	2–0 [2]
18 October 2025	Romania	Austria	1–3 [4]
3 November 2025	Cyprus	Bulgaria	2–0 [2]
12 November 2025	Qatar	Hong Kong	1–1 [2]
18 November 2025	Indonesia	Bahrain	0–3 [3]
28 November 2025	Argentina	Brazil	2–0 [5]
5 December 2025	Spain	Croatia	5–0 [5]
8 December 2025	Bhutan	Bahrain	0–5 [5]
23 December 2025	Indonesia	Cambodia	8–0 [9]
23 December 2025	Bhutan	Myanmar	5–0 [5]
10 February 2026	Qatar	Bahrain	4–1 [5]
25 February 2026	Hong Kong	Kuwait	2–1 [4]
7 March 2026	Malaysia	Bahrain	1–2 [3]
9 March 2026	Botswana	Lesotho	5–0 [5]
14 March 2026	Cyprus	Austria	1–1 [4]
International tournaments
Start date	Tournament		Winners
26 September 2025	(Zimbabwe) 2025 Men's T20 World Cup Africa Regional Final		Zimbabwe
8 October 2025	(Oman) 2025 Men's T20 World Cup Asia–EAP Regional Final		Nepal
30 October 2025	(Brazil) 2025 Men's South American Championship		Mexico
31 October 2025	2025 Cyprus Tri-Nation Series		Cyprus
6 November 2025	(Indonesia) 2025 Rising East Asia Tri-Series		Indonesia
14 November 2025	(Qatar) 2025 Asia Cup Rising Stars		Pakistan Shaheens
24 November 2025	(Malaysia) 2025 Mini SEA Games		Malaysia
4 December 2025	(Peru) 2025 Bolivarian Games		Barbados (Note: No matches in the Bolivarian Games were played with T20I status.)
4 December 2025	(Nigeria) 2025 West Africa Trophy		Nigeria
9 December 2025	(Thailand) 2025 Southeast Asian Games		Malaysia
25 February 2026	2026 Thailand Open Quadrangular Series		Bahrain
8 March 2026	(Cayman Islands) 2026 Men's T20 World Cup Americas Sub-regional Qualifier B		Cayman Islands
24 March 2026	(Ghana) 2026 Men's T20 World Cup Africa Sub-regional Qualifier B		Tanzania

=== Women's events ===
International tours
Start date	Home team	Away team	Results [Matches]
Start date	Home team	Away team	WT20I
2 October 2025	Malaysia	Nepal	2–3 [5]
20 October 2025	Uganda	Canada	5–0 [5]
30 October 2025	Brazil	Argentina A	1–0 [3] (Note: No matches in the Women's South American Championship were played with WT20I status.)
4 November 2025	Tanzania	Canada	2–1 [4]
27 November 2025	Singapore	Myanmar	0–3 [4]
3 February 2026	Oman	Denmark	4–0 [4]
9 February 2026	Qatar	Oman	1–4 [5]
International tournaments
Start date	Tournament		Winners
20 September 2025	(China) 2025 Belt and Road Trophy		Hong Kong
9 October 2025	(Romania) 2025 Women's Continental Cup		Norway
14 November 2025	2025 Thailand Women's Quadrangular Series		Scotland
20 November 2025	(Thailand) 2025 Women's Emerging Nations Trophy		Thailand
4 December 2025	(Peru) 2025 Bolivarian Games		Jamaica (Note: No matches in the Bolivarian Games were played with WT20I status.)
6 December 2025	2025 Oman Women's Tri-Nation Series		Oman
12 December 2025	(Oman) 2025 Women's Gulf Cup		United Arab Emirates
15 December 2025	(Thailand) 2025 Southeast Asian Games		Thailand
20 January 2025	(Bhutan) 2026 Lotus Cup		Hong Kong
13 February 2026	(Thailand) 2026 Women's Asia Cup Rising Stars		India A
20 March 2026	(Nigeria) 2026 Patricia Kambarami Cup		Nigeria

== September ==
=== 2025 Women's Belt and Road Trophy ===
Pos	Team	Pld	W	L	NR	Pts	NRR
1	Hong Kong	3	2	1	0	4	1.422
2	Myanmar	3	2	1	0	4	0.900
3	China	3	2	1	0	4	0.268
4	Mongolia	3	0	3	0	0	−3.686

Source: ESPNcricinfo

Round-robin
No.	Date	Team 1	Team 2	Venue	Result
WT20I 2516	20 September	China	Mongolia	ZJUT Cricket Field, Hangzhou	China by 10 wickets
WT20I 2517	20 September	Hong Kong	Myanmar	ZJUT Cricket Field, Hangzhou	Hong Kong by 28 runs
WT20I 2518	22 September	Hong Kong	Mongolia	ZJUT Cricket Field, Hangzhou	Hong Kong by 59 runs
WT20I 2519	22 September	China	Myanmar	ZJUT Cricket Field, Hangzhou	Myanmar by 1 wicket
WT20I 2520	23 September	Mongolia	Myanmar	ZJUT Cricket Field, Hangzhou	Myanmar by 7 wickets
WT20I 2521	23 September	China	Hong Kong	ZJUT Cricket Field, Hangzhou	China by 5 wickets
3rd place play-offs
WT20I 2522	25 September	China	Mongolia	ZJUT Cricket Field, Hangzhou	China by 8 wickets
Final
WT20I 2523	25 September	Hong Kong	Myanmar	ZJUT Cricket Field, Hangzhou	Hong Kong by 26 runs

=== 2025 Men's T20 World Cup Africa Regional Final ===
Group A standings
Pos	Team	Pld	W	L	NR	Pts	NRR	Qualification
1	Namibia	3	3	0	0	6	6.556	Advanced to the semi-final
2	Kenya	3	1	2	0	2	−1.553	Advanced to the semi-final
3	Nigeria	3	1	2	0	2	−1.822	Advanced to the play-offs
4	Malawi	3	1	2	0	2	−2.613	Advanced to the play-offs

Source: ESPNcricinfo

Group B standings
Pos	Team	Pld	W	L	NR	Pts	NRR	Qualification
1	Zimbabwe (H)	3	3	0	0	6	5.262	Advanced to the semi-final
2	Tanzania	3	2	1	0	4	−1.013	Advanced to the semi-final
3	Uganda	3	1	2	0	2	0.394	Advanced to the play-offs
4	Botswana	3	0	3	0	0	−5.198	Advanced to the play-offs

Source: ESPNcricinfo
(H) Host

Group stage
No.	Date	Team 1	Team 2	Venue	Result
T20I 3472	26 September	Kenya	Namibia	Harare Sports Club, Harare	Namibia by 136 runs
T20I 3473	26 September	Malawi	Nigeria	Takashinga Cricket Club, Harare	Nigeria by 9 wickets
T20I 3474	26 September	Uganda	Zimbabwe	Harare Sports Club, Harare	Zimbabwe by 5 wickets
T20I 3475	26 September	Botswana	Tanzania	Takashinga Cricket Club, Harare	Tanzania by 7 wickets
T20I 3478	28 September	Nigeria	Namibia	Harare Sports Club, Harare	Namibia by 117 runs
T20I 3479	28 September	Tanzania	Uganda	Takashinga Cricket Club, Harare	Tanzania by 9 runs
T20I 3480	28 September	Botswana	Zimbabwe	Harare Sports Club, Harare	Zimbabwe by 170 runs
T20I 3481	28 September	Kenya	Malawi	Takashinga Cricket Club, Harare	Malawi by 3 runs
T20I 3485	30 September	Tanzania	Zimbabwe	Harare Sports Club, Harare	Zimbabwe by 113 runs
T20I 3486	30 September	Botswana	Uganda	Takashinga Cricket Club, Harare	Uganda by 8 wickets
T20I 3488	30 September	Malawi	Namibia	Harare Sports Club, Harare	Namibia by 8 wickets
T20I 3489	30 September	Kenya	Nigeria	Takashinga Cricket Club, Harare	Kenya by 7 wickets
Semi-finals
T20I 3492	2 October	Namibia	Tanzania	Harare Sports Club, Harare	Namibia by 63 runs
T20I 3494	2 October	Zimbabwe	Kenya	Harare Sports Club, Harare	Zimbabwe by 7 wickets
5th–8th place semi-finals
T20I 3493	2 October	Botswana	Nigeria	Takashinga Cricket Club, Harare	Nigeria by 44 runs
T20I 3495	2 October	Malawi	Uganda	Takashinga Cricket Club, Harare	Uganda by 117 runs
7th Place play-off
T20I 3500	4 October	Botswana	Malawi	Takashinga Cricket Club, Harare	Malawi by 56 runs
3rd Place play-off
T20I 3501	4 October	Kenya	Tanzania	Harare Sports Club, Harare	Kenya by 51 runs
5th Place play-off
T20I 3502	4 October	Nigeria	Uganda	Takashinga Cricket Club, Harare	Uganda by 66 runs
Final
T20I 3503	4 October	Namibia	Zimbabwe	Harare Sports Club, Harare	Zimbabwe by 7 wickets

=== Kuwait in Oman ===
T20I series
No.	Date	Venue	Result
T20I 3484	29 September	Oman Cricket Academy Ground Turf 1, Al Amarat	Oman by 5 wickets
T20I 3487	30 September	Oman Cricket Academy Ground Turf 1, Al Amarat	Oman by 5 wickets

== October ==
=== Nepal women in Malaysia ===
WT20I series
No.	Date	Venue	Result
WT20I 2524	2 October	Bayuemas Oval, Pandamaran	Malaysia by 3 runs
WT20I 2525	4 October	Bayuemas Oval, Pandamaran	Nepal by 6 wickets
WT20I 2526	5 October	Bayuemas Oval, Pandamaran	Malaysia by 13 runs
WT20I 2529	7 October	Bayuemas Oval, Pandamaran	Nepal by 6 wickets
WT20I 2530	8 October	Bayuemas Oval, Pandamaran	Nepal by 5 wickets

=== 2025 Men's T20 World Cup Asia–EAP Regional Final ===
Group A standings
Pos	Team	Pld	W	L	NR	Pts	NRR	Qualification
1	United Arab Emirates	2	2	0	0	4	0.584	Advanced to the Super 6
2	Qatar	2	1	1	0	2	0.225	Advanced to the Super 6
3	Malaysia	2	0	2	0	0	−0.873	Eliminated

Source: ESPNcricinfo

Group B standings
Pos	Team	Pld	W	L	NR	Pts	NRR	Qualification
1	Nepal	2	2	0	0	4	1.834	Advanced to the Super 6
2	Japan	2	1	1	0	2	−0.309	Advanced to the Super 6
3	Kuwait	2	0	2	0	0	−1.576	Eliminated

Source: ESPNcricinfo

Group C standings
Pos	Team	Pld	W	L	NR	Pts	NRR	Qualification
1	Oman (H)	2	2	0	0	4	1.874	Advanced to the Super 6
2	Samoa	2	1	1	0	2	−0.302	Advanced to the Super 6
3	Papua New Guinea	2	0	2	0	0	−1.574	Eliminated

Source: ESPNcricinfo
(H) Host

Group stage
No.	Date	Team 1	Team 2	Venue	Result
T20I 3505	8 October	Oman	Samoa	Oman Cricket Academy Ground Turf 2, Al Amarat	Oman by 5 wickets
T20I 3506	8 October	Qatar	United Arab Emirates	Oman Cricket Academy Ground Turf 1, Al Amarat	United Arab Emirates by 7 wickets
T20I 3507	8 October	Kuwait	Nepal	Oman Cricket Academy Ground Turf 1, Al Amarat	Nepal by 58 runs
T20I 3508	9 October	Malaysia	Qatar	Oman Cricket Academy Ground Turf 2, Al Amarat	Qatar by 8 wickets
T20I 3509	9 October	Japan	Kuwait	Oman Cricket Academy Ground Turf 1, Al Amarat	Japan by 5 wickets
T20I 3510	9 October	Papua New Guinea	Samoa	Oman Cricket Academy Ground Turf 1, Al Amarat	Samoa by 6 wickets
T20I 3511	10 October	Malaysia	United Arab Emirates	Oman Cricket Academy Ground Turf 2, Al Amarat	United Arab Emirates by 6 wickets
T20I 3512	10 October	Japan	Nepal	Oman Cricket Academy Ground Turf 1, Al Amarat	Nepal by 5 wickets
T20I 3513	10 October	Oman	Papua New Guinea	Oman Cricket Academy Ground Turf 1, Al Amarat	Oman by 52 runs

Super 6 stage standings
Pos	Team	Pld	W	L	NR	Pts	NRR	Qualification
1	Nepal	5	5	0	0	10	1.849	Qualified for the 2026 Men's T20 World Cup
2	Oman	5	4	1	0	8	0.456	Qualified for the 2026 Men's T20 World Cup
3	United Arab Emirates	5	3	2	0	6	1.493	Qualified for the 2026 Men's T20 World Cup
4	Qatar	5	2	3	0	4	−0.114	Eliminated
5	Japan	5	1	4	0	2	−1.033	Eliminated
6	Samoa	5	0	5	0	0	−2.809	Eliminated

Source: ESPNcricinfo

Super 6
No.	Date	Team 1	Team 2	Venue	Result
T20I 3515	12 October	Oman	Qatar	Oman Cricket Academy Ground Turf 2, Al Amarat	Oman by 34 runs
T20I 3516	12 October	Nepal	United Arab Emirates	Oman Cricket Academy Ground Turf 1, Al Amarat	Nepal by 1 run
T20I 3517	12 October	Japan	Samoa	Oman Cricket Academy Ground Turf 1, Al Amarat	Japan by 4 runs
T20I 3518	13 October	Oman	United Arab Emirates	Oman Cricket Academy Ground Turf 1, Al Amarat	Oman by 5 wickets
T20I 3519	13 October	Nepal	Qatar	Oman Cricket Academy Ground Turf 1, Al Amarat	Nepal by 5 runs
T20I 3520	15 October	Japan	Qatar	Oman Cricket Academy Ground Turf 2, Al Amarat	Qatar by 3 wickets
T20I 3521	15 October	Samoa	United Arab Emirates	Oman Cricket Academy Ground Turf 1, Al Amarat	United Arab Emirates by 77 runs
T20I 3522	15 October	Oman	Nepal	Oman Cricket Academy Ground Turf 1, Al Amarat	Nepal by 38 runs
T20I 3523	16 October	Japan	United Arab Emirates	Oman Cricket Academy Ground Turf 1, Al Amarat	United Arab Emirates by 8 wickets
T20I 3524	16 October	Qatar	Samoa	Oman Cricket Academy Ground Turf 1, Al Amarat	Qatar by 8 wickets
T20I 3525	17 October	Oman	Japan	Oman Cricket Academy Ground Turf 1, Al Amarat	Oman by 9 wickets
T20I 3526	17 October	Nepal	Samoa	Oman Cricket Academy Ground Turf 1, Al Amarat	Nepal by 124 runs

=== 2025 Women's Continental Cup ===
Pos	Team	Pld	W	L	NR	Pts	NRR
1	Norway	4	3	1	0	6	1.143
2	Romania	4	3	1	0	6	1.054
3	Turkey	4	2	2	0	4	1.375
4	Austria	4	2	2	0	4	0.456
5	Bulgaria	4	0	4	0	0	−3.794

Source: ESPNcricinfo

Round-robin
No.	Date	Team 1	Team 2	Venue	Result
WT20I 2531	9 October	Romania	Austria	Moara Vlasei Cricket Ground, Ilfov County	Romania by 5 runs
WT20I 2532	9 October	Bulgaria	Turkey	Moara Vlasei Cricket Ground, Ilfov County	Turkey by 56 runs
WT20I 2533	10 October	Austria	Turkey	Moara Vlasei Cricket Ground, Ilfov County	Austria by 9 runs
WT20I 2534	10 October	Romania	Turkey	Moara Vlasei Cricket Ground, Ilfov County	Turkey by 6 wickets
WT20I 2535	10 October	Romania	Bulgaria	Moara Vlasei Cricket Ground, Ilfov County	Romania by 115 runs
WT20I 2536	11 October	Norway	Turkey	Moara Vlasei Cricket Ground, Ilfov County	Norway by 7 runs
WT20I 2537	11 October	Austria	Bulgaria	Moara Vlasei Cricket Ground, Ilfov County	Austria by 4 wickets
WT20I 2538	11 October	Romania	Norway	Moara Vlasei Cricket Ground, Ilfov County	Romania by 7 wickets
WT20I 2539	12 October	Austria	Norway	Moara Vlasei Cricket Ground, Ilfov County	Norway by 1 wicket
WT20I 2540	12 October	Bulgaria	Norway	Moara Vlasei Cricket Ground, Ilfov County	Norway by 98 runs

=== Austria in Romania ===
T20I series
No.	Date	Venue	Result
T20I 3528	18 October	Moara Vlasei Cricket Ground, Ilfov County	Austria by 4 wickets
T20I 3529	18 October	Moara Vlasei Cricket Ground, Ilfov County	Romania by 3 wickets
T20I 3530	19 October	Moara Vlasei Cricket Ground, Ilfov County	Austria by 7 wickets
T20I 3531	19 October	Moara Vlasei Cricket Ground, Ilfov County	Austria by 42 runs

=== Canada women in Uganda ===
Victoria Series (WT20I series)
No.	Date	Venue	Result
WT20I 2541	20 October	Lugogo Stadium, Kampala	Uganda by 7 wickets
WT20I 2542	21 October	Lugogo Stadium, Kampala	Uganda by 4 wickets
WT20I 2543	23 October	Lugogo Stadium, Kampala	Uganda by 18 runs
WT20I 2544	24 October	Lugogo Stadium, Kampala	Uganda by 43 runs
WT20I 2545	26 October	Lugogo Stadium, Kampala	Uganda by 12 runs

=== 2025 Men's South American Championship ===
Pos	Team	Pld	W	L	NR	Pts	NRR
1	Mexico	5	4	0	1	9	3.883
2	Panama	5	3	0	2	8	1.061
3	Brazil	5	3	1	1	7	1.342
4	Colombia	5	1	3	1	3	−2.133
5	Uruguay	5	0	3	2	2	−1.946
6	Peru	5	0	4	1	1	−2.438

Source: Cricheroes

Group stage
No.	Date	Team 1	Team 2	Venue	Result
1st Match	30 October	Brazil	Uruguay	San Fernando Polo and Cricket Club, Itaguaí	Brazil by 52 runs
2nd Match	30 October	Mexico	Peru	San Fernando Polo and Cricket Club (Campo Sede), Itaguaí	Mexico by 126 runs
3rd Match	30 October	Colombia	Uruguay	San Fernando Polo and Cricket Club, Itaguaí	No result
T20I 3539	30 October	Mexico	Panama	San Fernando Polo and Cricket Club (Campo Sede), Itaguaí	No result
5th Match	31 October	Peru	Uruguay	San Fernando Polo and Cricket Club, Itaguaí	No result
T20I 3545	31 October	Brazil	Panama	SanFernando Polo and Cricket Club (Campo Sede), Itaguaí	No result
7th Match	31 October	Brazil	Colombia	San Fernando Polo and Cricket Club, Itaguaí	Brazil by 8 wickets
8th Match	31 October	Panama	Peru	San Fernando Polo and Cricket Club (Campo Sede), Itaguaí	Panama by 1 wicket
9th Match	31 October	Mexico	Uruguay	San Fernando Polo and Cricket Club (3), Itaguaí	Mexico by 49 runs
10th Match	1 November	Colombia	Mexico	San Fernando Polo and Cricket Club, Itaguaí	Mexico by 8 wickets
11th Match	1 November	Brazil	Peru	San Fernando Polo and Cricket Club, Itaguaí	Brazil by 3 wickets
12th Match	2 November	Colombia	Panama	Saa Fernando Polo and Cricket Club (Campo Sede), Itaguaí	Panama by 41 runs
T20I 3554	2 November	Brazil	Mexico	San Fernando Polo and Cricket Club, Itaguaí	Mexico by 54 runs
14th Match	2 November	Panama	Uruguay	San Fernando Polo and Cricket Club (Campo Sede), Itaguaí	Panama by 5 wickets
15th Match	2 November	Colombia	Peru	San Fernando Polo and Cricket Club (3), Itaguaí	Colombia by 6 wickets

=== Argentina A women in Brazil ===
Women's South American Championship
No.	Date	Venue	Result
1st Match	30 October	Sao Fernando Polo and Cricket Club (3), Itaguaí	Brazil by 69 runs
2nd Match	30 October	Sao Fernando Polo and Cricket Club (3), Itaguaí	No result
3rd Match	31 October	Sao Fernando Polo and Cricket Club (3), Itaguaí	No result

=== 2025 Cyprus Tri-Nation Series ===
Pos	Team	Pld	W	L	NR	Pts	NRR
1	Cyprus	4	4	0	0	8	2.583
2	Bulgaria	4	2	2	0	4	0.747
3	Serbia	4	0	4	0	0	−3.474

Source: ESPNcricinfo

Group stage
No.	Date	Team 1	Team 2	Venue	Result
T20I 3540	31 October	Cyprus	Serbia	Happy Valley Ground 2, Episkopi	Cyprus by 88 runs
T20I 3542	31 October	Cyprus	Serbia	Happy Valley Ground 2, Episkopi	Cyprus by 41 runs
T20I 3547	1 November	Bulgaria	Serbia	Happy Valley Ground 2, Episkopi	Bulgaria by 8 wickets
T20I 3548	1 November	Bulgaria	Serbia	Happy Valley Ground 2, Episkopi	Bulgaria by 69 runs
T20I 3550	2 November	Cyprus	Bulgaria	Happy Valley Ground 2, Episkopi	Cyprus by 3 wickets
T20I 3552	2 November	Cyprus	Bulgaria	Happy Valley Ground 2, Episkopi	Cyprus by 64 runs

== November ==
=== Bulgaria in Cyprus ===
T20I series
No.	Date	Venue	Result
T20I 3555	3 November	Happy Valley Ground 2, Episkopi	Cyprus by 4 wickets
T20I 3556	3 November	Happy Valley Ground 2, Episkopi	Cyprus by 6 wickets

=== Canada women in Tanzania ===
WT20I series
No.	Date	Venue	Result
WT20I 2546	4 November	Gymkhana Club Ground, Dar es Salaam	No result
WT20I 2547	5 November	Gymkhana Club Ground, Dar es Salaam	Tanzania by 26 runs
WT20I 2548	5 November	Gymkhana Club Ground, Dar es Salaam	Canada by 28 runs
WT20I 2549	6 November	Gymkhana Club Ground, Dar es Salaam	Tanzania by 10 runs

=== 2025 Rising East Asia Tri-Series ===
Pos	Team	Pld	W	L	NR	Pts	NRR
1	Indonesia	8	8	0	0	16	5.398
2	Myanmar	8	4	4	0	8	1.741
3	Timor-Leste	8	0	8	0	0	−6.494

Source: ESPNcricinfo

Round-robin
No.	Date	Team 1	Team 2	Venue	Result
T20I 3558	6 November	Indonesia	Myanmar	Udayana Cricket Ground, Jimbaran	Indonesia by 9 wickets
T20I 3559	6 November	Indonesia	Timor-Leste	Udayana Cricket Ground, Jimbaran	Indonesia by 10 wickets
T20I 3562	7 November	Myanmar	Timor-Leste	Udayana Cricket Ground, Jimbaran	Myanmar by 10 wickets
T20I 3563	8 November	Indonesia	Timor-Leste	Udayana Cricket Ground, Jimbaran	Indonesia by 10 wickets
T20I 3564	8 November	Indonesia	Myanmar	Udayana Cricket Ground, Jimbaran	Indonesia by 26 runs (DLS)
T20I 3567	9 November	Myanmar	Timor-Leste	Udayana Cricket Ground, Jimbaran	Myanmar by 8 wickets
T20I 3569	11 November	Indonesia	Myanmar	Udayana Cricket Ground, Jimbaran	Indonesia by 5 wickets (DLS)
T20I 3570	11 November	Indonesia	Timor-Leste	Udayana Cricket Ground, Jimbaran	Indonesia by 10 wickets (DLS)
T20I 3572	12 November	Myanmar	Timor-Leste	Udayana Cricket Ground, Jimbaran	Myanmar by 93 runs
T20I 3575	13 November	Indonesia	Timor-Leste	Udayana Cricket Ground, Jimbaran	Indonesia by 9 wickets
T20I 3576	13 November	Indonesia	Myanmar	Udayana Cricket Ground, Jimbaran	Indonesia by 10 wickets
T20I 3578	14 November	Myanmar	Timor-Leste	Udayana Cricket Ground, Jimbaran	Myanmar by 87 runs

=== Hong Kong in Qatar ===
T20I series
No.	Date	Venue	Result
T20I 3573	12 November	West End Park International Cricket Stadium, Doha	Qatar by 6 runs
T20I 3577	13 November	UDST Cricket Ground, Doha	Hong Kong by 9 runs

=== 2025 Thailand Women's Quadrangular Series ===
Pos	Team	Pld	W	L	NR	Pts	NRR
1	Scotland	3	3	0	0	6	1.584
2	Thailand	3	2	1	0	4	0.755
3	Papua New Guinea	3	1	2	0	2	−0.945
4	Namibia	3	0	3	0	0	−1.252

Source: ESPNcricinfo

Round-robin
No.	Date	Team 1	Team 2	Venue	Result
WT20I 2550	14 November	Papua New Guinea	Scotland	Terdthai Cricket Ground, Bangkok	Scotland by 55 runs
WT20I 2551	14 November	Thailand	Namibia	Terdthai Cricket Ground, Bangkok	Thailand by 39 runs
WT20I 2552	15 November	Namibia	Papua New Guinea	Terdthai Cricket Ground, Bangkok	Papua New Guinea by 6 wickets
WT20I 2553	15 November	Thailand	Scotland	Terdthai Cricket Ground, Bangkok	Scotland by 2 wickets
WT20I 2554	17 November	Namibia	Scotland	Terdthai Cricket Ground, Bangkok	Scotland by 7 wickets
WT20I 2555	17 November	Thailand	Papua New Guinea	Terdthai Cricket Ground, Bangkok	Thailand by 7 wickets

=== 2025 Asia Cup Rising Stars ===
Pos	Team	Pld	W	L	NR	Pts	NRR
1	Bangladesh A	3	2	1	0	4	2.323
2	Sri Lanka A	3	2	1	0	4	0.970
3	Afghanistan A	3	2	1	0	4	−0.321
4	Hong Kong	3	0	3	0	0	−2.947

Source: ESPNcricinfo

Pos	Team	Pld	W	L	NR	Pts	NRR
1	Pakistan Shaheens	3	3	0	0	6	4.560
2	India A	3	2	1	0	4	1.979
3	Oman	3	1	2	0	2	−1.020
4	United Arab Emirates	3	0	3	0	0	−5.283

Source: ESPNcricinfo

Round-robin
No.	Date	Team 1	Team 2	Venue	Result
1st Match	14 November	Pakistan Shaheens	Oman	West End Park International Cricket Stadium, Doha	Pakistan Shaheens by 40 runs
2nd Match	14 November	India A	United Arab Emirates	West End Park International Cricket Stadium, Doha	India A by 148 runs
3rd Match	15 November	Bangladesh A	Hong Kong	West End Park International Cricket Stadium, Doha	Bangladesh A by 8 wickets
4th Match	15 November	Afghanistan A	Sri Lanka A	West End Park International Cricket Stadium, Doha	Afghanistan A by 3 wickets
T20I 3579	16 November	Oman	United Arab Emirates	West End Park International Cricket Stadium, Doha	Oman by 2 wickets
6th Match	16 November	India A	Pakistan Shaheens	West End Park International Cricket Stadium, Doha	Pakistan Shaheens by 8 wickets
7th Match	17 November	Hong Kong	Sri Lanka A	West End Park International Cricket Stadium, Doha	Sri Lanka A by 7 wickets
8th Match	17 November	Afghanistan A	Bangladesh A	West End Park International Cricket Stadium, Doha	Bangladesh A by 8 wickets
9th Match	18 November	Pakistan Shaheens	United Arab Emirates	West End Park International Cricket Stadium, Doha	Pakistan Shaheens by 9 wickets
10th Match	18 November	India A	Oman	West End Park International Cricket Stadium, Doha	India A by 6 wickets
11th Match	19 November	Afghanistan A	Hong Kong	West End Park International Cricket Stadium, Doha	Afghanistan A by 24 runs
12th Match	19 November	Bangladesh A	Sri Lanka A	West End Park International Cricket Stadium, Doha	Sri Lanka A by 6 runs
Semi-finals
13th Match	21 November	Bangladesh A	India A	West End Park International Cricket Stadium, Doha	Match tied ( Bangladesh A won S/O)
14th Match	21 November	Pakistan Shaheens	Sri Lanka A	West End Park International Cricket Stadium, Doha	Pakistan Shaheens by 5 runs
Final
15th Match	23 November	Bangladesh A	Pakistan Shaheens	West End Park International Cricket Stadium, Doha	Match tied ( Pakistan Shaheens won S/O)

=== Bahrain in Indonesia ===
T20I series
No.	Date	Venue	Result
T20I 3580	18 November	Udayana Cricket Ground, Jimbaran	Bahrain by 53 runs (DLS)
T20I 3582	19 November	Udayana Cricket Ground, Jimbaran	Bahrain by 147 runs
T20I 3584	21 November	Udayana Cricket Ground, Jimbaran	Bahrain by 7 wickets

=== 2025 Women's Emerging Nations Trophy ===
Pos	Team	Pld	W	L	NR	Pts	NRR
1	Thailand	7	5	2	0	10	1.362
2	United Arab Emirates	7	5	2	0	10	1.278
3	Netherlands	7	5	2	0	10	0.987
4	Scotland	7	5	2	0	10	0.359
5	Papua New Guinea	7	4	3	0	8	0.026
6	Uganda	7	2	5	0	4	−1.040
7	Namibia	7	1	6	0	2	−1.345
8	Tanzania	7	1	6	0	2	−1.649

Source: ESPNcricinfo

Round-robin
No.	Date	Team 1	Team 2	Venue	Result
WT20I 2556	20 November	Thailand	Netherlands	Terdthai Cricket Ground, Bangkok	Thailand by 23 runs
WT20I 2557	20 November	Papua New Guinea	United Arab Emirates	Asian Institute of Technology Ground, Bangkok	United Arab Emirates by 8 wickets
WT20I 2558	20 November	Namibia	Tanzania	Asian Institute of Technology Ground, Bangkok	Tanzania by 8 wickets
WT20I 2559	20 November	Scotland	Uganda	Terdthai Cricket Ground, Bangkok	Scotland by 15 runs
WT20I 2560	21 November	Netherlands	United Arab Emirates	Asian Institute of Technology Ground, Bangkok	Netherlands by 4 wickets
WT20I 2561	21 November	Thailand	Papua New Guinea	Terdthai Cricket Ground, Bangkok	Papua New Guinea by 8 runs
WT20I 2562	21 November	Namibia	Uganda	Terdthai Cricket Ground, Bangkok	Namibia by 12 runs
WT20I 2563	21 November	Scotland	Tanzania	Asian Institute of Technology Ground, Bangkok	Scotland by 5 runs
WT20I 2564	23 November	Netherlands	Tanzania	Asian Institute of Technology Ground, Bangkok	Netherlands by 7 wickets
WT20I 2565	23 November	Papua New Guinea	Uganda	Terdthai Cricket Ground, Bangkok	Uganda by 4 runs
WT20I 2566	23 November	Scotland	United Arab Emirates	Terdthai Cricket Ground, Bangkok	Scotland by 10 wickets
WT20I 2567	23 November	Thailand	Namibia	Asian Institute of Technology Ground, Bangkok	Thailand by 27 runs
WT20I 2568	25 November	Thailand	Tanzania	Terdthai Cricket Ground, Bangkok	Thailand by 51 runs
WT20I 2569	25 November	Uganda	United Arab Emirates	Asian Institute of Technology Ground, Bangkok	United Arab Emirates by 10 wickets
WT20I 2570	25 November	Namibia	Scotland	Asian Institute of Technology Ground, Bangkok	Scotland by 7 wickets
WT20I 2571	25 November	Netherlands	Papua New Guinea	Terdthai Cricket Ground, Bangkok	Papua New Guinea by 8 runs
WT20I 2572	26 November	Tanzania	United Arab Emirates	Terdthai Cricket Ground, Bangkok	United Arab Emirates by 7 wickets
WT20I 2573	26 November	Thailand	Uganda	Asian Institute of Technology Ground, Bangkok	Thailand by 8 wickets
WT20I 2574	26 November	Namibia	Netherlands	Terdthai Cricket Ground, Bangkok	Netherlands by 51 runs
WT20I 2575	26 November	Papua New Guinea	Scotland	Asian Institute of Technology Ground, Bangkok	Scotland by 6 wickets
WT20I 2577	28 November	Thailand	United Arab Emirates	Terdthai Cricket Ground, Bangkok	United Arab Emirates by 7 runs
WT20I 2578	28 November	Tanzania	Uganda	Asian Institute of Technology Ground, Bangkok	Uganda by 7 wickets
WT20I 2579	28 November	Namibia	Papua New Guinea	Asian Institute of Technology Ground, Bangkok	Papua New Guinea by 1 run
WT20I 2580	28 November	Netherlands	Scotland	Terdthai Cricket Ground, Bangkok	Netherlands by 27 runs
WT20I 2582	30 November	Netherlands	Uganda	Terdthai Cricket Ground, Bangkok	Netherlands by 6 wickets
WT20I 2583	30 November	Namibia	United Arab Emirates	Asian Institute of Technology Ground, Bangkok	United Arab Emirates by 28 runs
WT20I 2585	30 November	Thailand	Scotland	Asian Institute of Technology Ground, Bangkok	Thailand by 3 wickets
WT20I 2586	30 November	Papua New Guinea	Tanzania	Terdthai Cricket Ground, Bangkok	Papua New Guinea by 20 runs

=== 2025 Mini SEA Games ===
Pos	Team	Pld	W	L	NR	Pts	NRR
1	Malaysia	4	2	0	2	6	0.178
2	Bahrain	4	1	2	1	3	0.889
3	Thailand	4	0	1	3	3	−2.914

Source: ESPNcricinfo

Round-robin
No.	Date	Team 1	Team 2	Venue	Result
T20I 3587	24 November	Malaysia	Thailand	Bayuemas Oval, Pandamaran	No result
T20I 3588	25 November	Bahrain	Malaysia	Bayuemas Oval, Pandamaran	Malaysia by 4 wickets
T20I 3590	27 November	Bahrain	Thailand	Bayuemas Oval, Pandamaran	No result
T20I 3592a	28 November	Malaysia	Thailand	Bayuemas Oval, Pandamaran	Match abandoned
T20I 3597	30 November	Bahrain	Thailand	Bayuemas Oval, Pandamaran	Bahrain by 7 wickets
T20I 3600	1 December	Malaysia	Bahrain	Bayuemas Oval, Pandamaran	Malaysia by 5 runs

=== Myanmar women in Singapore ===
WT20I series
No.	Date	Venue	Result
WT20I 2576	27 November	Singapore National Cricket Ground, Singapore	Myanmar by 10 wickets (DLS)
WT20I 2581	29 November	Singapore National Cricket Ground, Singapore	Myanmar by 8 wickets
WT20I 2584	30 November	Singapore National Cricket Ground, Singapore	Myanmar by 11 runs
WT20I 2586a	2 December	Singapore National Cricket Ground, Singapore	Match abandoned

=== Brazil in Argentina ===
T20I series
No.	Date	Venue	Result
T20I 3593	28 November	Club San Albano, Burzaco	Argentina by 8 wickets
T20I 3595	29 November	Club San Albano, Burzaco	No result
T20I 3596a	29 November	Club San Albano, Burzaco	Match abandoned
T20I 3598	30 November	Club San Albano, Burzaco	Argentina by 44 runs
T20I 3599	30 November	Club San Albano, Burzaco	No result

== December ==
=== 2025 Bolivarian Games ===
==== Men's tournament ====
Pos	Team	Pld	W	L	NR	Pts	NRR
1	Barbados	3	3	0	0	6	2.482
2	Trinidad and Tobago	3	2	1	0	4	1.726
3	Jamaica	3	1	2	0	2	0.332
4	Peru	3	0	3	0	0	−6.121

Source: Bolivarianos2025

Round-robin
No.	Date	Team 1	Team 2	Venue	Result
1st Match	4 December	Peru	Trinidad and Tobago	El Cortijo Polo Club, Lima	Trinidad and Tobago by 9 wickets
2nd Match	4 December	Jamaica	Trinidad and Tobago	El Cortijo Polo Club, Lima	Trinidad and Tobago by 6 wickets
3rd Match	5 December	Peru	Jamaica	El Cortijo Polo Club, Lima	Jamaica by 9 wickets
4th Match	5 December	Barbados	Trinidad and Tobago	El Cortijo Polo Club, Lima	Barbados by 34 runs
5th Match	6 December	Barbados	Jamaica	El Cortijo Polo Club, Lima	Barbados by 20 runs
6th Match	6 December	Peru	Barbados	El Cortijo Polo Club, Lima	Barbados by 7 wickets
Bronze medal match
7th Match	7 December	Peru	Jamaica	El Cortijo Polo Club, Lima	Jamaica by 119 runs
Gold medal match
8th Match	7 December	Barbados	Trinidad and Tobago	El Cortijo Polo Club, Lima	Barbados by 11 runs

==== Women's tournament ====
Pos	Team	Pld	W	L	NR	Pts	NRR
1	Trinidad and Tobago	4	4	0	0	8	3.478
2	Jamaica	4	2	2	0	4	0.076
3	Barbados	4	0	4	0	0	−3.340

Source: Bolivarianos2025

Round-robin
No.	Date	Team 1	Team 2	Venue	Result
1st Match	4 December	Jamaica	Trinidad and Tobago	El Cortijo Polo Club, Lima	Trinidad and Tobago by 7 wickets
2nd Match	4 December	Trinidad and Tobago	Barbados	El Cortijo Polo Club, Lima	Trinidad and Tobago by 108 runs
3rd Match	5 December	Barbados	Jamaica	El Cortijo Polo Club, Lima	Jamaica by 27 runs
4th Match	5 December	Trinidad and Tobago	Jamaica	El Cortijo Polo Club, Lima	Trinidad and Tobago by 8 wickets
5th Match	6 December	Barbados	Trinidad and Tobago	El Cortijo Polo Club, Lima	Trinidad and Tobago by 74 runs
6th Match	6 December	Jamaica	Barbados	El Cortijo Polo Club, Lima	Jamaica by 7 wickets
Gold medal match
7th Match	7 December	Jamaica	Trinidad and Tobago	El Cortijo Polo Club, Lima	Jamaica by 6 wickets

=== 2025 West Africa Trophy ===
Pos	Team	Pld	W	L	NR	Pts	NRR
1	Nigeria	9	8	1	0	16	1.702
2	Rwanda	9	6	3	0	12	0.731
3	Zambia	9	3	6	0	6	−0.532
4	Sierra Leone	9	1	8	0	2	−2.044

Source: ESPNcricinfo

Round-robin
No.	Date	Team 1	Team 2	Venue	Result
T20I 3602	4 December	Nigeria	Zambia	Nigeria Cricket Federation Oval 1, Abuja	Nigeria by 19 runs
T20I 3603	4 December	Rwanda	Sierra Leone	Nigeria Cricket Federation Oval 1, Abuja	Rwanda by 7 wickets
T20I 3604	5 December	Rwanda	Zambia	Nigeria Cricket Federation Oval 1, Abuja	Rwanda by 7 wickets
T20I 3605	5 December	Nigeria	Sierra Leone	Nigeria Cricket Federation Oval 1, Abuja	Nigeria by 30 runs
T20I 3607	6 December	Nigeria	Rwanda	Nigeria Cricket Federation Oval 1, Abuja	Nigeria by 9 runs
T20I 3609	6 December	Sierra Leone	Zambia	Nigeria Cricket Federation Oval 1, Abuja	Zambia by 15 runs
T20I 3611	7 December	Nigeria	Sierra Leone	Nigeria Cricket Federation Oval 1, Abuja	Nigeria by 9 wickets
T20I 3613	7 December	Rwanda	Zambia	Nigeria Cricket Federation Oval 1, Abuja	Rwanda by 8 wickets
T20I 3616	8 December	Rwanda	Sierra Leone	Nigeria Cricket Federation Oval 1, Abuja	Rwanda by 58 runs
T20I 3617	8 December	Nigeria	Zambia	Nigeria Cricket Federation Oval 1, Abuja	Nigeria by 23 runs
T20I 3621	9 December	Nigeria	Rwanda	Nigeria Cricket Federation Oval 1, Abuja	Rwanda by 23 runs
T20I 3622	9 December	Sierra Leone	Zambia	Nigeria Cricket Federation Oval 1, Abuja	Zambia by 5 wickets
T20I 3629	11 December	Rwanda	Zambia	Nigeria Cricket Federation Oval 1, Abuja	Zambia by 24 runs
T20I 3630	11 December	Nigeria	Sierra Leone	Nigeria Cricket Federation Oval 1, Abuja	Nigeria by 68 runs
T20I 3635	12 December	Nigeria	Zambia	Nigeria Cricket Federation Oval 1, Abuja	Nigeria by 26 runs
T20I 3636	12 December	Rwanda	Sierra Leone	Nigeria Cricket Federation Oval 1, Abuja	Rwanda by 47 runs
T20I 3640	13 December	Nigeria	Rwanda	Nigeria Cricket Federation Oval 1, Abuja	Nigeria by 81 runs
T20I 3641	13 December	Sierra Leone	Zambia	Nigeria Cricket Federation Oval 1, Abuja	Sierra Leone by 3 wickets
3rd Place play-off
T20I 3642	14 December	Sierra Leone	Zambia	Nigeria Cricket Federation Oval 1, Abuja	Zambia by 20 runs
Final
T20I 3643	14 December	Nigeria	Rwanda	Nigeria Cricket Federation Oval 1, Abuja	Nigeria by 40 runs

=== Croatia in Spain ===
T20I series
No.	Date	Venue	Result
T20I 3606	5 December	La Manga Club Top Ground, Cartagena	Spain by 8 wickets
T20I 3608	6 December	La Manga Club Top Ground, Cartagena	Spain by 182 runs
T20I 3610	6 December	La Manga Club Top Ground, Cartagena	Spain by 9 wickets
T20I 3612	7 December	La Manga Club Top Ground, Cartagena	Spain by 215 runs
T20I 3614	7 December	La Manga Club Top Ground, Cartagena	Spain by 8 wickets

=== 2025 Oman Women's Tri-Nation Series ===
Pos	Team	Pld	W	L	NR	Pts	NRR
1	Oman	2	2	0	0	4	3.148
2	Qatar	2	1	1	0	2	0.525
3	Bahrain	2	0	2	0	0	−4.592

Source: ESPNcricinfo

Round-robin
No.	Date	Team 1	Team 2	Venue	Result
WT20I 2588	6 December	Oman	Bahrain	Oman Cricket Academy Ground Turf 2, Al Amarat	Oman by 10 wickets
WT20I 2589	7 December	Oman	Qatar	Oman Cricket Academy Ground Turf 2, Al Amarat	Oman by 18 runs
WT20I 2591	9 December	Bahrain	Qatar	Oman Cricket Academy Ground Turf 2, Al Amarat	Qatar by 6 wickets
Final
WT20I 2592	10 December	Oman	Qatar	Oman Cricket Academy Ground Turf 2, Al Amarat	Oman by 13 runs

=== Bahrain in Bhutan ===
T20I series
No.	Date	Venue	Result
T20I 3615	8 December	Gelephu International Cricket Ground, Gelephu	Bahrain by 8 wickets
T20I 3619	9 December	Gelephu International Cricket Ground, Gelephu	Bahrain by 63 runs
T20I 3627	11 December	Gelephu International Cricket Ground, Gelephu	Bahrain by 35 runs
T20I 3633	12 December	Gelephu International Cricket Ground, Gelephu	Bahrain by 42 runs
T20I 3638	13 December	Gelephu International Cricket Ground, Gelephu	Bahrain by 4 wickets

=== 2025 Southeast Asian Games ===
==== Men's T20 Tournament ====
Pos	Team	Pld	W	L	NR	Pts	NRR
1	Malaysia	4	4	0	0	8	5.760
2	Philippines	4	3	1	0	6	−0.208
3	Singapore	4	2	2	0	4	−0.827
4	Indonesia	4	1	3	0	2	−1.877
5	Thailand	4	0	4	0	0	−1.872

Source: ESPNcricinfo

Round-robin
No.	Date	Team 1	Team 2	Venue	Result
T20I 3618	9 December	Thailand	Indonesia	Terdthai Cricket Ground, Bangkok	Indonesia by 5 wickets
T20I 3620	9 December	Malaysia	Philippines	Terdthai Cricket Ground, Bangkok	Malaysia by 114 runs
T20I 3624	10 December	Malaysia	Indonesia	Terdthai Cricket Ground, Bangkok	Malaysia by 7 wickets
T20I 3625	10 December	Philippines	Singapore	Terdthai Cricket Ground, Bangkok	Philippines by 14 runs
T20I 3626	11 December	Thailand	Singapore	Terdthai Cricket Ground, Bangkok	Singapore by 4 runs
T20I 3628	11 December	Indonesia	Philippines	Terdthai Cricket Ground, Bangkok	Philippines by 78 runs
T20I 3632	12 December	Indonesia	Singapore	Terdthai Cricket Ground, Bangkok	Singapore by 3 wickets
T20I 3634	12 December	Thailand	Malaysia	Terdthai Cricket Ground, Bangkok	Malaysia by 8 wickets
T20I 3637	13 December	Thailand	Philippines	Terdthai Cricket Ground, Bangkok	Philippines by 1 wicket
T20I 3639	13 December	Malaysia	Singapore	Terdthai Cricket Ground, Bangkok	Malaysia by 6 wickets

==== Women's T20 Tournament ====
Pos	Team	Pld	W	L	NR	Pts	NRR
1	Thailand	2	2	0	0	4	10.611
2	Myanmar	2	1	1	0	2	−0.096
3	Singapore	2	0	2	0	0	−7.450

Source: ESPNcricinfo

Pos	Team	Pld	W	L	NR	Pts	NRR
1	Malaysia	2	2	0	0	4	2.441
2	Indonesia	2	1	1	0	2	3.050
3	Philippines	2	0	2	0	0	−6.191

Source: ESPNcricinfo

Group stage
No.	Date	Team 1	Team 2	Venue	Result
WT20I 2599	15 December	Thailand	Myanmar	Terdthai Cricket Ground, Bangkok	Thailand by 9 wickets
WT20I 2601	15 December	Indonesia	Malaysia	Terdthai Cricket Ground, Bangkok	Malaysia by 18 runs
WT20I 2604	16 December	Indonesia	Philippines	Terdthai Cricket Ground, Bangkok	Indonesia by 140 runs
WT20I 2606	16 December	Thailand	Singapore	Terdthai Cricket Ground, Bangkok	Thailand by 226 runs
WT20I 2609	17 December	Malaysia	Philippines	Terdthai Cricket Ground, Bangkok	Malaysia by 8 wickets
WT20I 2610	17 December	Myanmar	Singapore	Terdthai Cricket Ground, Bangkok	Myanmar by 72 runs
Semi-finals
WT20I 2611	18 December	Thailand	Indonesia	Terdthai Cricket Ground, Bangkok	Thailand by 74 runs
WT20I 2613	18 December	Malaysia	Myanmar	Terdthai Cricket Ground, Bangkok	Malaysia by 89 runs
Bronze medal match
WT20I 2616	19 December	Indonesia	Myanmar	Terdthai Cricket Ground, Bangkok	Indonesia by 5 wickets
Gold medal match
WT20I 2617	19 December	Thailand	Malaysia	Terdthai Cricket Ground, Bangkok	Thailand by 7 wickets

=== 2025 Women's Gulf Cup ===
Pos	Team	Pld	W	L	NR	Pts	NRR
1	United Arab Emirates	5	5	0	0	10	8.517
2	Oman	5	4	1	0	8	2.357
3	Kuwait	5	3	2	0	6	1.042
4	Qatar	5	2	3	0	4	−1.220
5	Bahrain	5	1	4	0	2	−2.099
6	Saudi Arabia	5	0	5	0	0	−8.384

Source: ESPNcricinfo

Round-robin
No.	Date	Team 1	Team 2	Venue	Result
WT20I 2593	12 December	Kuwait	Qatar	Oman Cricket Academy Ground Turf 1, Al Amarat	Kuwait by 68 runs
WT20I 2594	12 December	Oman	United Arab Emirates	Oman Cricket Academy Ground Turf 1, Al Amarat	United Arab Emirates by 10 wickets
WT20I 2595	12 December	Bahrain	Saudi Arabia	Oman Cricket Academy Ground Turf 1, Al Amarat	Bahrain by 107 runs
WT20I 2596	13 December	Qatar	United Arab Emirates	Oman Cricket Academy Ground Turf 1, Al Amarat	United Arab Emirates by 136 runs
WT20I 2597	13 December	Oman	Saudi Arabia	Oman Cricket Academy Ground Turf 1, Al Amarat	Oman by 167 runs
WT20I 2598	13 December	Bahrain	Kuwait	Oman Cricket Academy Ground Turf 1, Al Amarat	Kuwait by 7 wickets
WT20I 2600	15 December	Oman	Bahrain	Oman Cricket Academy Ground Turf 1, Al Amarat	Oman by 9 wickets
WT20I 2602	15 December	Qatar	Saudi Arabia	Oman Cricket Academy Ground Turf 1, Al Amarat	Qatar by 9 wickets
WT20I 2603	15 December	Kuwait	United Arab Emirates	Oman Cricket Academy Ground Turf 1, Al Amarat	United Arab Emirates by 9 wickets
WT20I 2605	16 December	Bahrain	Qatar	Oman Cricket Academy Ground Turf 1, Al Amarat	Qatar by 48 runs
WT20I 2607	16 December	Saudi Arabia	United Arab Emirates	Oman Cricket Academy Ground Turf 1, Al Amarat	United Arab Emirates by 238 runs
WT20I 2608	16 December	Oman	Kuwait	Oman Cricket Academy Ground Turf 1, Al Amarat	Oman by 9 wickets
WT20I 2612	18 December	Kuwait	Saudi Arabia	Oman Cricket Academy Ground Turf 1, Al Amarat	Kuwait by 10 wickets
WT20I 2614	18 December	Bahrain	United Arab Emirates	Oman Cricket Academy Ground Turf 1, Al Amarat	United Arab Emirates by 157 runs
WT20I 2615	18 December	Oman	Qatar	Oman Cricket Academy Ground Turf 1, Al Amarat	Oman by 6 wickets
Final
WT20I 2618	19 December	Oman	United Arab Emirates	Oman Cricket Academy Ground Turf 1, Al Amarat	United Arab Emirates by 9 wickets

=== Cambodia in Indonesia ===
T20I series
No.	Date	Venue	Result
T20I 3646	23 December	Udayana Cricket Ground, Jimbaran	Indonesia by 60 runs
T20I 3648	23 December	Udayana Cricket Ground, Jimbaran	Indonesia by 3 runs
T20I 3649	24 December	Udayana Cricket Ground, Jimbaran	Indonesia by 8 wickets
T20I 3651	25 December	Udayana Cricket Ground, Jimbaran	Indonesia by 27 runs
T20I 3652	26 December	Udayana Cricket Ground, Jimbaran	No result
T20I 3654	26 December	Udayana Cricket Ground, Jimbaran	Indonesia by 3 wickets
T20I 3655	27–28 December	Udayana Cricket Ground, Jimbaran	Indonesia by 9 wickets
T20I 3657	27–28 December	Udayana Cricket Ground, Jimbaran	Indonesia by 6 wickets
T20I 3658	29 December	Udayana Cricket Ground, Jimbaran	Indonesia by 6 wickets

=== Myanmar in Bhutan ===
T20I series
No.	Date	Venue	Result
T20I 3647	23 December	Gelephu International Cricket Ground, Gelephu	Bhutan by 8 wickets
T20I 3650	24 December	Gelephu International Cricket Ground, Gelephu	Bhutan by 120 runs
T20I 3653	26 December	Gelephu International Cricket Ground, Gelephu	Bhutan by 82 runs
T20I 3656	27 December	Gelephu International Cricket Ground, Gelephu	Bhutan by 121 runs
T20I 3659	29 December	Gelephu International Cricket Ground, Gelephu	Bhutan by 84 runs

== January ==
=== 2026 Lotus Cup ===
Pos	Team	Pld	W	L	NR	Pts	NRR
1	Hong Kong	4	4	0	0	8	1.886
2	Bhutan	4	2	2	0	4	−0.767
3	Malaysia	4	0	4	0	0	−1.124

Source: ESPNcricinfo

Round-robin
No.	Date	Team 1	Team 2	Venue	Result
WT20I 2630	20 January	Bhutan	Malaysia	Gelephu International Cricket Ground, Gelephu	Bhutan by 3 wickets
WT20I 2633	21 January	Hong Kong	Malaysia	Gelephu International Cricket Ground, Gelephu	Hong Kong by 51 runs
WT20I 2636	22 January	Bhutan	Hong Kong	Gelephu International Cricket Ground, Gelephu	Hong Kong by 64 runs
WT20I 2641	24 January	Bhutan	Malaysia	Gelephu International Cricket Ground, Gelephu	Bhutan by 8 wickets
WT20I 2644	25 January	Bhutan	Hong Kong	Gelephu International Cricket Ground, Gelephu	Hong Kong by 12 runs
WT20I 2647	26 January	Hong Kong	Malaysia	Gelephu International Cricket Ground, Gelephu	Hong Kong by 9 wickets
Qualifier
WT20I 2650	27 January	Bhutan	Malaysia	Gelephu International Cricket Ground, Gelephu	Bhutan by 8 wickets
Final
WT20I 2654	29 January	Bhutan	Hong Kong	Gelephu International Cricket Ground, Gelephu	Hong Kong by 97 runs

== February ==
=== Denmark women in Oman ===
WT20I series
No.	Date	Venue	Result
WT20I 2661	3 February	Oman Cricket Academy Ground Turf 2, Al Amerat	Oman by 109 runs
WT20I 2662	4 February	Oman Cricket Academy Ground Turf 2, Al Amerat	Oman by 70 runs
WT20I 2663	6 February	Oman Cricket Academy Ground Turf 1, Al Amerat	Oman by 138 runs
WT20I 2664	7 February	Oman Cricket Academy Ground Turf 2, Al Amerat	Oman by 85 runs

=== Oman women in Qatar ===
WT20I series
No.	Date	Venue	Result
WT20I 2665	9 February	West End Park International Cricket Stadium, Doha	Oman by 7 runs
WT20I 2666	10 February	West End Park International Cricket Stadium, Doha	Oman by 2 runs
WT20I 2668	12 February	West End Park International Cricket Stadium, Doha	Oman by 41 runs
WT20I 2669	13 February	West End Park International Cricket Stadium, Doha	Oman by 8 wickets
WT20I 2672	14 February	West End Park International Cricket Stadium, Doha	Qatar by 7 runs

=== Bahrain in Qatar ===
T20I series
No.	Date	Venue	Result
T20I 3695	10 February	West End Park International Cricket Stadium, Doha	Qatar by 7 wickets
T20I 3699	11 February	West End Park International Cricket Stadium, Doha	Qatar by 51 runs
T20I 3706	13 February	West End Park International Cricket Stadium, Doha	Qatar by 31 runs
T20I 3710	14 February	West End Park International Cricket Stadium, Doha	Bahrain by 5 wickets
T20I 3714	15 February	West End Park International Cricket Stadium, Doha	Qatar by 51 runs

=== 2026 Women's Asia Cup Rising Stars ===
Pos	Team	Pld	W	L	NR	Pts	NRR
1	India A	3	2	1	0	4	3.042
2	Pakistan A	3	2	1	0	4	0.457
3	United Arab Emirates	3	2	1	0	4	−0.765
4	Nepal	3	0	3	0	0	−2.596

Source: ESPNcricinfo

Pos	Team	Pld	W	L	NR	Pts	NRR
1	Bangladesh A	3	3	0	0	6	1.601
2	Sri Lanka A	3	2	1	0	4	2.083
3	Thailand	3	1	2	0	2	1.236
4	Malaysia	3	0	3	0	0	−4.971

Source: ESPNcricinfo

Round-robin
No.	Date	Team 1	Team 2	Venue	Result
1st Match	13 February	Nepal	Pakistan A	Terdthai Cricket Ground, Bangkok	Pakistan A by 30 runs
2nd Match	13 February	India A	United Arab Emirates	Terdthai Cricket Ground, Bangkok	United Arab Emirates by 7 wickets
WT20I 2671	14 February	Thailand	Malaysia	Terdthai Cricket Ground, Bangkok	Thailand by 99 runs
4th Match	14 February	Bangladesh A	Sri Lanka A	Terdthai Cricket Ground, Bangkok	Bangladesh A by 4 runs
5th Match	15 February	Nepal	United Arab Emirates	Terdthai Cricket Ground, Bangkok	United Arab Emirates by 18 runs
6th Match	15 February	India A	Pakistan A	Terdthai Cricket Ground, Bangkok	India A won by 8 wickets
7th Match	16 February	Malaysia	Sri Lanka A	Terdthai Cricket Ground, Bangkok	Sri Lanka A by 106 runs
8th Match	16 February	Thailand	Bangladesh A	Terdthai Cricket Ground, Bangkok	Bangladesh A by 3 wickets
9th Match	17 February	India A	Nepal	Terdthai Cricket Ground, Bangkok	India A won by 7 wickets
10th Match	17 February	Pakistan A	United Arab Emirates	Terdthai Cricket Ground, Bangkok	Pakistan A by 9 wickets
11th Match	18 February	Bangladesh A	Malaysia	Terdthai Cricket Ground, Bangkok	Bangladesh A by 90 runs
12th Match	18 February	Thailand	Sri Lanka A	Terdthai Cricket Ground, Bangkok	Sri Lanka A by 23 runs
Semi-finals
13th Match	20 February	India A	Sri Lanka A	Terdthai Cricket Ground, Bangkok	India A by 5 wickets
14th Match	20 February	Bangladesh A	Pakistan A	Terdthai Cricket Ground, Bangkok	Bangladesh A by 54 runs
Final
15th Match	22 February	Bangladesh A	India A	Terdthai Cricket Ground, Bangkok	India A won by 46 runs

=== 2026 Thailand Open Quadrangular Series ===
Pos	Team	Pld	W	L	NR	Pts	NRR
1	Japan	3	3	0	0	6	3.830
2	Bahrain	3	2	1	0	4	−0.893
3	Thailand	3	1	2	0	2	0.183
4	Bhutan	3	0	3	0	0	−2.623

Source: ESPNcricinfo

Round-robin
No.	Date	Team 1	Team 2	Venue	Result
T20I 3733	25 February	Thailand	Japan	Terdthai Cricket Ground, Bangkok	Japan by 37 runs
T20I 3735	25 February	Bahrain	Bhutan	Terdthai Cricket Ground, Bangkok	Bahrain by 4 wickets
T20I 3737	26 February	Thailand	Bhutan	Terdthai Cricket Ground, Bangkok	Thailand by 60 runs
T20I 3739	26 February	Bahrain	Japan	Terdthai Cricket Ground, Bangkok	Japan by 8 wickets
T20I 3742	27 February	Bhutan	Japan	Terdthai Cricket Ground, Bangkok	Japan by 77 runs
T20I 3743	27 February	Thailand	Bahrain	Terdthai Cricket Ground, Bangkok	Bahrain by 12 runs
3rd Place play-off
T20I 3745	28 February	Thailand	Bhutan	Terdthai Cricket Ground, Bangkok	Bhutan by 7 runs
Final
T20I 3746	28 February	Bahrain	Japan	Terdthai Cricket Ground, Bangkok	Match tied (Bahrain won S/O)

=== Kuwait in Hong Kong ===
Bauhinia Falcon T20I Series
No.	Date	Venue	Result
T20I 3734	25 February	Mission Road Ground, Mong Kok	Hong Kong by 3 wickets
T20I 3738	26 February	Mission Road Ground, Mong Kok	Hong Kong by 22 runs
T20I 3745a	28 February	Mission Road Ground, Mong Kok	Match abandoned
T20I 3748	1 March	Mission Road Ground, Mong Kok	Kuwait by 3 wickets

== March ==
=== Bahrain in Malaysia ===
T20I Series
No.	Date	Venue	Result
T20I 3753	7 March	Bayuemas Oval, Pandamaran	Malaysia by 34 runs
T20I 3754	8 March	Bayuemas Oval, Pandamaran	Bahrain by 2 runs
T20I 3761	10 March	Bayuemas Oval, Pandamaran	Bahrain by 7 wickets (DLS)

=== 2026 Men's T20 World Cup Americas Sub-regional Qualifier B ===
Qualifier B standings
Pos	Team	Pld	W	L	NR	Pts	NRR	Qualification
1	Cayman Islands (H)	6	6	0	0	12	3.560	Advanced to the regional final
2	Argentina	6	4	2	0	8	0.831	Advanced to the regional final
3	Suriname	6	1	5	0	2	−1.387	Eliminated
4	Mexico	6	1	5	0	2	−2.413	Eliminated

Source: ESPNcricinfo
(H) Host

Round-robin
No.	Date	Team 1	Team 2	Venue	Result
T20I 3756	8 March	Cayman Islands	Argentina	Jimmy Powell Oval, George Town	Cayman Islands by 10 wickets
T20I 3757	8 March	Mexico	Suriname	Jimmy Powell Oval, George Town	Mexico by 9 runs
T20I 3759	9 March	Argentina	Suriname	Jimmy Powell Oval, George Town	Argentina by 15 runs
T20I 3760	9 March	Cayman Islands	Mexico	Jimmy Powell Oval, George Town	Cayman Islands by 9 wickets
T20I 3763	11 March	Cayman Islands	Suriname	Jimmy Powell Oval, George Town	Cayman Islands by 9 wickets
T20I 3764	11 March	Argentina	Mexico	Jimmy Powell Oval, George Town	Argentina by 62 runs
T20I 3766	12 March	Cayman Islands	Mexico	Jimmy Powell Oval, George Town	Cayman Islands by 93 runs
T20I 3767	12 March	Argentina	Suriname	Jimmy Powell Oval, George Town	Argentina by 7 wickets
T20I 3770	14 March	Argentina	Mexico	Jimmy Powell Oval, George Town	Argentina by 92 runs
T20I 3771	14 March	Cayman Islands	Suriname	Jimmy Powell Oval, George Town	Cayman Islands by 9 wickets
T20I 3774	15 March	Mexico	Suriname	Jimmy Powell Oval, George Town	Suriname by 4 wickets
T20I 3775	15 March	Cayman Islands	Argentina	Jimmy Powell Oval, George Town	Cayman Islands by 6 wickets

=== Lesotho in Botswana ===
T20I Series
No.	Date	Venue	Result
T20I 3758	9 March	Botswana Cricket Association Oval 1, Gaborone	Botswana by 6 wickets
T20I 3762	10 March	Botswana Cricket Association Oval 1, Gaborone	Botswana by 6 wickets
T20I 3765	12 March	Botswana Cricket Association Oval 1, Gaborone	Botswana by 6 runs
T20I 3768	13 March	Botswana Cricket Association Oval 1, Gaborone	Botswana by 104 runs
T20I 3773	15 March	Botswana Cricket Association Oval 1, Gaborone	Botswana by 84 runs

=== Austria in Cyprus ===
T20I Series
No.	Date	Venue	Result
T20I 3769	14 March	Happy Valley Ground 2, Episkopi	Cyprus by 49 runs
T20I 3773a	15 March	Happy Valley Ground 2, Episkopi	Match abandoned
T20I 3773b	15 March	Happy Valley Ground 2, Episkopi	Match abandoned
T20I 3776	16 March	Happy Valley Ground 2, Episkopi	Austria by 7 wickets

=== 2026 Patricia Kambarami Cup ===
During the opening match of the tournament, Rwanda batter Fanny Utagushimaninde (111 not out) became the youngest player to score a century in a T20I (at the age of 15 years and 223 days) and the first woman to score a century on T20I debut.

Pos	Team	Pld	W	L	NR	Pts	NRR
1	Rwanda	4	4	0	0	8	3.016
2	Nigeria	4	3	1	0	6	2.143
3	South Africa U19	4	2	2	0	4	1.662
4	Zimbabwe U19	4	1	3	0	2	0.509
5	Ghana	4	0	4	0	0	−6.712

Source: ESPNcricinfo

Round-robin
No.	Date	Team 1	Team 2	Venue	Result
WT20I 2687	20 March	Ghana	Rwanda	Tafawa Balewa Square Cricket Oval, Lagos	Rwanda by 122 runs
2nd Match	20 March	Nigeria	Zimbabwe U19	Tafawa Balewa Square Cricket Oval, Lagos	Nigeria by 8 wickets
3rd Match	21 March	Ghana	South Africa U19	Tafawa Balewa Square Cricket Oval, Lagos	South Africa U19 by 99 runs
4th Match	21 March	Rwanda	Zimbabwe U19	Tafawa Balewa Square Cricket Oval, Lagos	Rwanda by 60 runs
WT20I 2690	22 March	Nigeria	Ghana	Tafawa Balewa Square Cricket Oval, Lagos	Nigeria by 136 runs
6th Match	22 March	Rwanda	South Africa U19	Tafawa Balewa Square Cricket Oval, Lagos	Rwanda by 4 runs (DLS)
7th Match	24 March	South Africa U19	Zimbabwe U19	Tafawa Balewa Square Cricket Oval, Lagos	South Africa U19 by 28 runs
WT20I 2692	24 March	Nigeria	Rwanda	Tafawa Balewa Square Cricket Oval, Lagos	Rwanda by 6 wickets
9th Match	25 March	Nigeria	South Africa U19	Tafawa Balewa Square Cricket Oval, Lagos	Match tied (Nigeria won S/O)
10th Match	25 March	Ghana	Zimbabwe U19	Tafawa Balewa Square Cricket Oval, Lagos	Zimbabwe U19 by 180 runs
Semi-finals
11th Match	27 March	Rwanda	Zimbabwe U19	Tafawa Balewa Square Cricket Oval, Lagos	Rwanda by 5 wickets
12th Match	27 March	Nigeria	South Africa U19	Tafawa Balewa Square Cricket Oval, Lagos	Nigeria by 7 wickets
3rd Place play-off
13th Match	28 March	South Africa U19	Zimbabwe U19	Tafawa Balewa Square Cricket Oval, Lagos	South Africa U19 by 70 runs
Final
WT20I 2694	28 March	Nigeria	Rwanda	Tafawa Balewa Square Cricket Oval, Lagos	Nigeria by 9 runs

=== 2026 Men's T20 World Cup Africa Sub-regional Qualifier B ===
Qualifier B standings
Pos	Team	Pld	W	L	NR	Pts	NRR	Qualification
1	Tanzania	5	4	0	1	9	6.705	Advanced to the regional final
2	Ghana (H)	5	4	0	1	9	3.309	Advanced to the regional final
3	Malawi	5	2	2	1	5	0.778	Eliminated
4	Seychelles	5	1	3	1	3	−3.045	Eliminated
5	Eswatini	5	1	3	1	3	−3.983	Eliminated
6	Saint Helena	5	0	4	1	1	−3.931	Eliminated

Source: Cricinfo
(H) Host

Round-robin
No.	Date	Team 1	Team 2	Venue	Result
T20I 3780	24 March	Malawi	Tanzania	Achimota Oval A, Accra	Tanzania by 8 wickets
T20I 3781	24 March	Eswatini	Saint Helena	Achimota Oval A, Accra	Eswatini by 27 runs
T20I 3782	24 March	Ghana	Seychelles	Achimota Oval B, Accra	Ghana by 6 wickets
T20I 3784	25 March	Saint Helena	Seychelles	Achimota Oval A, Accra	Seychelles by 7 wickets
T20I 3785	25 March	Eswatini	Tanzania	Achimota Oval B, Accra	Tanzania by 158 runs
T20I 3786	25 March	Ghana	Malawi	Achimota Oval A, Accra	Ghana by 2 wickets
T20I 3787	27 March	Ghana	Saint Helena	Achimota Oval A, Accra	Ghana by 9 wickets
T20I 3788	27 March	Eswatini	Malawi	Achimota Oval B, Accra	Malawi by 8 wickets
T20I 3789	27 March	Seychelles	Tanzania	Achimota Oval B, Accra	Tanzania by 153 runs
T20I 3790	28 March	Saint Helena	Tanzania	Achimota Oval B, Accra	Tanzania by 161 runs
T20I 3791	28 March	Malawi	Seychelles	Achimota Oval A, Accra	Malawi by 6 wickets
T20I 3792	28 March	Ghana	Eswatini	Achimota Oval B, Accra	Ghana by 83 runs
T20I 3792a	29 March	Eswatini	Seychelles	Achimota Oval A, Accra	Match abandoned
T20I 3792b	29 March	Ghana	Tanzania	Achimota Oval A, Accra	Match abandoned
T20I 3792c	29 March	Malawi	Saint Helena	Achimota Oval B, Accra	Match abandoned

== See also ==
- International cricket in 2025–26
- Associate international cricket in 2025
- Associate international cricket in 2026
