= 2013 Americas Twenty20 Division Two =

2013 ICC World Cricket League Americas Region Twenty20 Division Two
- Administrator: International Cricket Council
- Cricket format: Twenty20
- Tournament format: Round-robin
- Host: Bahamas
- Champions: Bahamas (1st title)
- Participants: 5
- Matches: 10
- Player of the series: (The Bahamas) Jonathan Barry
- Most runs: (The Bahamas) Jonathan Barry (153)
- Most wickets: (Turks and Caicos Islands) Damian St. Ange (9)

The 2013 ICC World Cricket League Americas Region Twenty20 Division Two is a cricket tournament that took place between 5–9 February 2013. The Bahamas hosted the event.

== Teams ==
Teams that qualified are as follows:

- Argentina
- Bahamas
- Belize
- Panama
- Turks and Caicos Islands

== Squads ==
Argentina	Bahamas	Belize	Panama	Turks and Caicos Islands
Esteban MacDermott (c); Pedro Arrighi; Pedro Bruno; Alejandro Ferguson; Pablo Ferguson; Hernan Fennell; Carlos Gibson; David Mauro; Lautaro Musiani; Lucas Paterlini; Martin Rost; Martin Siri; Alejo Tissera; Hernan Williams (wk)	Gregory Taylor (c); Jonathan Barry; Turan Brown; Rudolph Fox; Gregory Irving; Jagnauth Jagroo; Julio Jemison (wk); Mark Levy; Roderick Mitchell; Andrew Nash; Albert Peters; Ryan Tappin; Marc Taylor; Dwight Weakley	Dirk Sutherland (c); Mykelt Anthony; Warren Anthony; Andrew Banner; Herbert Banner; Jonathan Benjamin; Keve Flowers; Percival Flowers; Dorian Gabb (wk); Howell Gillet; Jermaine Pook; Kenroy Roca; Michael Sobers; Conway Young	Irfan Tarajia (c); Bharat Ahir; Hiren Ahir; Rajesh Ahir; Vimal Ahir; Kishan Bhakta; Samir Bhakta; Mahmud Bhana; Mohammed Bulbulia; Soyeb Chohan; Ebrahim Patel; Sufiyan Tarajya; Zuleman Vesamia; Ibrahim Vhora	Gareth Butler (c); Ira Baptiste; Nuwan Bodhinayake; Garvin Bruno; Errion Charles; Howard Dickenson; Earl Henry; Mark Henry; Sabutan John; Vikram John; Kavin Mars; Christopher McFarlane; Damian St. Ange; Ancell Williams

== Fixtures ==
=== Group stage ===
==== Points table ====
Team	P	W	L	T	NR	Points	NRR
Bahamas	4	4	0	0	0	8	+1.932
Panama	4	2	2	0	0	4	+0.380
Belize	4	2	2	0	0	4	-0.819
Argentina	4	1	3	0	0	2	+0.187
Turks and Caicos Islands	4	1	3	0	0	2	-1.710

Teams that qualified for 2013 Americas Division One

==== Matches ====
5 February
12:00 PM
Scorecard

Belize; 116/9 (20 overs)	v	Panama; 118/6 (18.2 overs)
Conway Young 34 (32); Rajesh Ahir 3/15 (3 overs)		Mahmud Bhana 32* (23); Mykelt Anthony 2/24 (4 overs)

Panama won by 4 wickets
Haynes Oval, Nassau

- Panama won the toss and elected to field.

5 February
12:00 PM
Scorecard

Bahamas; 160/8 (20 overs)	v	Argentina; 146/6 (20 overs)
Jonathan Barry 45 (31); Hernan Fennell 4/19 (4 overs)		Alejandro Ferguson 32 (29); Jonathan Barry 1/17 (2 overs)

Bahamas won by 14 runs
Haynes Oval, Nassau

- Bahamas won the toss and elected to bat.

6 February
12:00 PM
Scorecard

Bahamas; 149 (20 overs)	v	Belize; 86 (14.5 overs)
Jonathan Barry 37 (23); Kenroy Roca 3/27 (4 overs)		Herbert Banner 19 (16); Jagnauth Jagroo 3/9 (2 overs)

Bahamas won by 63 runs
Haynes Oval, Nassau

- Belize won the toss and elected to field.

6 February
12:00 PM
Scorecard

Panama; 170/7 (20 overs)	v	Turks and Caicos Islands; 173/5 (19.5 overs)
Bharat Ahir 35 (33); Mark Henry 3/23 (3 overs)		Nuwan Bodhinayake 49 (35); Ibrahim Vhora 2/36 (4 overs)

Turks and Caicos Islands won by 5 wickets
Haynes Oval, Nassau

- Panama won the toss and elected to bat.

7 February
12:00 PM
Scorecard

Panama; 150/7 (20 overs)	v	Argentina; 121 (20 overs)
Rajesh Ahir 42 (25); Pedro Arrighi 3/22 (3 overs)		Martin Siri 58 (50); Mohammed Bulbulia 3/22 (4 overs)

Panama won by 29 runs
Haynes Oval, Nassau

- Panama won the toss and elected to bat.

7 February
12:00 PM
Scorecard

Turks and Caicos Islands; 142/8 (20 overs)	v	Belize; 145/7 (19.1 overs)
Gareth Butler 46 (51); Andrew Banner 3/10 (3 overs)		Conway Young 42* (49); Damian St. Ange 3/26 (4 overs)

Belize won by 3 wickets
Haynes Oval, Nassau

- Turks and Caicos Islands won the toss and elected to bat.

8 February
12:00 PM
Scorecard

Argentina; 127 (19.4 overs)	v	Turks and Caicos Islands; 63 (14 overs)
Alejo Tissera 34 (34); Damian St. Ange 3/16 (4 overs)		Nuwan Bodhinayake 20 (9); Lucas Paterlini 3/24 (4 overs)

Argentina won by 64 runs
Haynes Oval, Nassau

- Argentina won the toss and elected to bat.

8 February
12:00 PM
Scorecard

Bahamas; 165/7 (20 overs)	v	Panama; 156/5 (20 overs)
Marc Taylor 49 (44); Mohammed Bulbulia 2/17 (4 overs)		Mohammed Bulbulia 68* (66); Gregory Taylor 2/21 (4 overs)

Bahamas won by 9 runs
Haynes Oval, Nassau

- Bahamas won the toss and elected to bat.

9 February
12:00 PM
Scorecard

Bahamas; 161/6 (13 overs)	v	Turks and Caicos Islands; 106/8 (13 overs)
Marc Taylor 76 (32); Damian St. Ange 3/21 (3 overs)		Damian St. Ange 36 (19); Albert Peters 3/21 (3 overs)

Bahamas won by 55 runs
Haynes Oval, Nassau

- Turks and Caicos Islands won the toss and elected to field.
- Rain reduced match to 13 overs per side.
- Bahamas won the 2013 ICC ICC World Cricket League Americas Region Twenty20 Division Two and qualified for 2013 Americas Division One as a result of this match.

9 February
12:00 PM
Scorecard

Belize; 103/9 (15 overs)	v	Argentina; 96/7 (15 overs)
Herbert Banner 42 (25); Lautaro Musiani 3/22 (3 overs)		David Mauro 27* (14); Andrew Banner 2/24 (3 overs)

Belize won by 7 runs
Haynes Oval, Nassau

- Turks and Caicos Islands won the toss and elected to field.
- Rain reduced match to 15 overs per side.

== Statistics ==
=== Most Runs ===
The top five run scorers (total runs) are included in this table.

Player	Team	Runs	Inns	Avg	S/R	HS	100s	50s
Jonathan Barry	Bahamas	153	4	38.25	162.77	53	0	1
Marc Taylor	Bahamas	149	4	37.25	153.61	76	0	1
Martin Siri	Argentina	132	4	33.00	112.82	58	0	1
Mohammed Bulbulia	Panama	111	4	37.00	90.24	68*	0	1
Conway Young	Belize	109	6	36.33	97.32	42*	0	0

=== Most Wickets ===
The top five wicket takers (total wickets) are listed in this table.

Player	Team	Wkts	Mts	Ave	S/R	Econ	BBI
Damian St. Ange	Turks and Caicos Islands	9	4	10.55	10.0	6.33	3/16
Andrew Banner	Belize	8	3	8.87	7.5	7.10	3/10
Hernan Fennell	Argentina	7	4	11.71	12.9	5.46	4/19
Albert Peters	Bahamas	7	4	12.71	12.7	6.00	3/21
Ibrahim Vhora	Panama	7	4	14.28	13.7	6.25	3/24

== See also ==
- 2013 ICC World Twenty20 Qualifier
