= Hernán Fennell =

Argentine cricketer

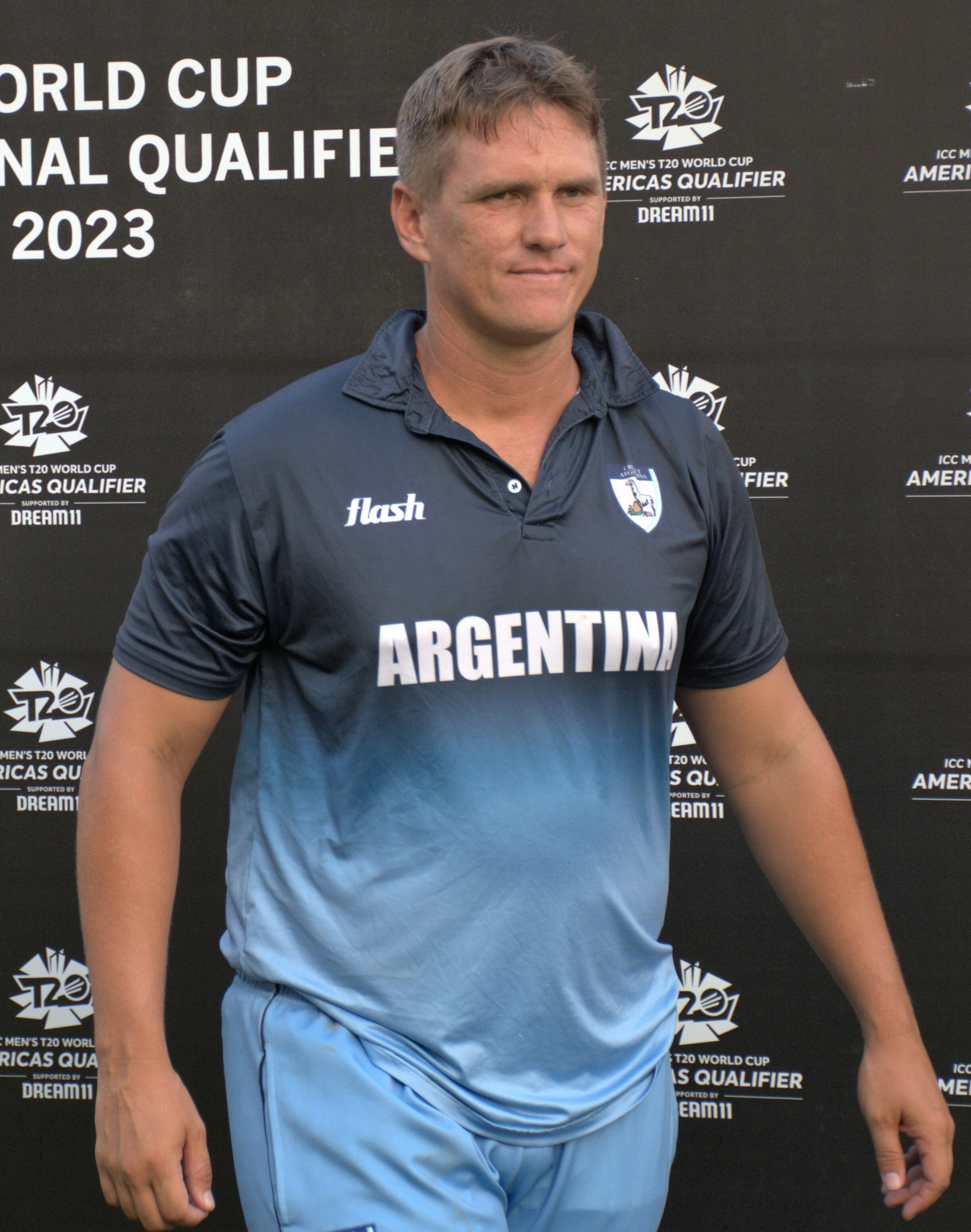

Personal information
- Born: 2 February 1988 (age 38); Argentina
- Batting: Right-handed
- Bowling: Right-arm medium

International information
- National side: Argentina
- T20I debut (cap 5): 3 October 2019 v Mexico
- Last T20I: 16 December 2024 v Brazil

Career statistics
| Competition | T20I | T20 |
|---|---|---|
| Matches | 28 | 28 |
| Runs scored | 84 | 84 |
| Batting average | 6.46 | 6.46 |
| 100s/50s | 0/0 | 0/0 |
| Top score | 25* | 25* |
| Balls bowled | 567 | 567 |
| Wickets | 50 | 50 |
| Bowling average | 11.20 | 11.20 |
| 5 wickets in innings | 2 | 2 |
| 10 wickets in match | 0 | 0 |
| Best bowling | 6/18 | 6/18 |
| Catches/stumpings | 3/– | 3/– |
- Source: Cricinfo, 17 May 2025

Hernán Fennell (born 2 February 1988) is an Argentine cricketer and a former captain of the national team. He played in the 2013 ICC World Cricket League Division Six tournament and the 2019 South American Cricket Championship, a Twenty20 International (T20I) tournament at El Cortijo Polo Club near Lima, Peru.

== Coaching career ==
Fennell was head coach of a Cricket Sin Fronteras (Cricket Without Borders) cricket team from Buenos Aires that went to Rome in 2017 to play against St Peter’s Cricket Club; there they had an audience with Pope Francis. The project began in 2009 and offers alternatives to violence and crime for young people in at-risk neighborhoods; almost 800 boys and girls, aged between six and twenty, were learning to play cricket in 2017. In 2019 Fennell continued as head coach and participants exceeded 1500. Besides being a Level II Coach certified by the West Indies Cricket Board, Fennell is a physical education teacher, with a high performance sport registration.

== International career ==
In September 2019, he was named in Argentina's Twenty20 International (T20I) squad for the men's tournament at the 2019 South American Cricket Championship. He made his T20I debut for Argentina, against Mexico, on 3 October 2019.

In November 2021, he was named as the captain of Argentina's squad for the 2021 ICC Men's T20 World Cup Americas Qualifier tournament in Antigua. On 10 November 2021, in Argentina's match against Panama, Fennell became the first bowler for Argentina to take a hat-trick in T20Is.

In December 2024, he took his second T20I hat-trick in a match against the Cayman Islands at the 2024 Men's T20 World Cup Americas Sub-regional Qualifier and became only the sixth bowler to take four wickets in four consecutive balls in men's T20Is.
