= List of Argentina Twenty20 International cricketers =

This is a list of Argentinian Twenty20 International cricketers. In April 2018, the ICC decided to grant full Twenty20 International (T20I) status to all its members. Therefore, all Twenty20 matches played between Argentina and other ICC members after 1 January 2019 will be eligible for T20I status.

This list comprises all members of the Argentina cricket team who have played at least one T20I match. It is initially arranged in the order in which each player won his first Twenty20 cap. Where more than one player won his first Twenty20 cap in the same match, those players are listed alphabetically by surname. Argentina played their first T20I matches during the 2019 South American Cricket Championship in October 2019.

== Key ==
General

- ‡ – Captain
- † – Wicket-keeper
- First – Year of debut
- Last – Year of latest game
- Mat – Number of matches played

Batting

- Runs – Runs scored in career
- HS – Highest score
- Avg – Runs scored per dismissal
- 50 – Number of half centuries
- * – Batsman remained not out

Bowling

- Balls – Balls bowled in career
- Wkt – Wickets taken in career
- BBI – Best bowling in an innings
- Ave – Average runs per wicket

Fielding

- Ca – Catches taken
- St – Stumpings affected

== List of players ==
Statistics are correct as of 15 March 2026.

Argentina T20I cricketers
General					Batting				Bowling				Fielding		Ref
No.	Name	First	Last	Mat	Runs	HS	Avg	50	Balls	Wkt	BBI	Ave	Ca	St	Ref
1	Bruno Angeletti	2019	2024	9	3	2	1.00	0	–	–	–	–	1	0	
2	Pedro Arrighi	2019	2023	8	43	18	7.16	0	186	14	5/4	12.28	4	0	
3	Pedro Baron‡†	2019	2026	38	947	73	29.59	9	–	–	–	–	21	1	
4	Ramiro Escobar†	2019	2026	27	364	55	24.26	1	–	–	–	–	13	4	
5	Hernán Fennell ‡	2019	2026	38	85	25*	5.66	0	744	59	6/18	12.64	4	0	
6	Alejandro Ferguson	2019	2026	33	577	86*	27.47	3	–	–	–	–	11	0	
7	Jonathan Hurley	2019	2021	7	0	0	0.00	0	156	10	3/13	14.40	2	0	
8	Agustin Husain	2019	2026	23	18	6	18.00	0	372	20	3/8	18.55	5	0	
9	Lautaro Musiani	2019	2023	16	185	44*	13.21	0	173	7	3/31	25.42	6	0	
10	Santiago Rossi	2019	2023	10	39	13	4.87	0	131	6	2/15	22.16	7	0	
11	Ruann van der Merwe	2019	2019	5	1	1*	–	0	78	8	3/9	7.75	2	0	
12	Martín Siri	2019	2021	10	206	49*	25.75	0	–	–	–	–	4	0	
13	Pedro Luis Bruno	2021	2021	6	56	27	14.00	0	–	–	–	–	0	0	
14	Alan Kirschbaum	2021	2026	33	434	51*	17.36	1	631	33	3/8	18.78	17	0	
15	Tomas Rossi	2021	2026	28	271	46	15.94	0	398	22	3/19	21.00	8	0	
16	Augusto Mustafa	2021	2024	9	30	10*	15.00	0	18	0	–	–	5	0	
17	Esteban Nino	2021	2021	2	1	1*	–	0	12	0	–	–	0	0	
18	Agustin Rivero	2023	2026	27	185	31	11.56	0	487	28	4/17	15.32	16	0	
19	David Mauro	2023	2023	4	17	12*	–	0	–	–	–	–	1	0	
20	Guido Angeletti	2023	2026	11	94	18*	9.40	0	94	4	1/9	23.25	2	0	
21	Santiago Duggan	2023	2024	7	1	1*	–	0	120	5	1/10	20.40	1	0	
22	Manuel Iturbe	2023	2026	16	47	16	6.71	0	–	–	–	–	3	0	
23	Ian Roberts	2023	2026	6	–	–	–	–	12	0	–	–	0	0	
24	Lucas Rossi	2023	2026	20	258	55	16.12	1	348	26	5/3	11.07	2	0	
25	Santiago Iturbe†	2023	2025	12	12	9*	6.00	0	–	–	–	–	14	1	
26	Oliver Rowe	2023	2023	1	–	–	–	–	12	0	–	–	0	0	
27	Franz Bur	2024	2025	4	2	2*	–	0	18	1	1/16	25.00	0	0	
28	Steven Kruger	2024	2024	1	0	0	0.00	0	24	0	–	–	0	0	
29	Juan Cabrera	2025	2026	7	5	5*	–	0	78	3	2/18	24.66	0	0	
