= List of Brazil Twenty20 International cricketers =

This is a list of Brazilian Twenty20 International cricketers. In April 2018, the ICC decided to grant full Twenty20 International (T20I) status to all its members. Therefore, all Twenty20 matches played between Brazil and other ICC members after 1 January 2019 will be eligible to have T20I status.

This list comprises all members of the Brazil cricket team who have played at least one T20I match. It is initially arranged in the order in which each player won his first Twenty20 cap. Where more than one player won his first Twenty20 cap in the same match, those players are listed alphabetically by surname. Brazil played their first T20I matches during the 2019 South American Cricket Championship in October 2019.

== Key ==
General

- ‡ – Captain
- † – Wicket-keeper
- First – Year of debut
- Last – Year of latest game
- Mat – Number of matches played

Batting

- Runs – Runs scored in career
- HS – Highest score
- Avg – Runs scored per dismissal
- 50 – Number of half centuries
- * – Batsman remained not out

Bowling

- Balls – Balls bowled in career
- Wkt – Wickets taken in career
- BBI – Best bowling in an innings
- Ave – Average runs per wicket

Fielding

- Ca – Catches taken
- St – Stumpings affected

== List of players ==
Statistics are correct as of 9 August 2026.

Brazil T20I cricketers
General					Batting				Bowling				Fielding		Ref
No.	Name	First	Last	Mat	Runs	HS	Avg	50	Balls	Wkt	BBI	Ave	Ca	St	Ref
1	Jaimin Allen	2019	2019	2	1	1*	1.00	0	12	1	1/7	19.00	0	0	
2	Richard Avery	2019	2024	12	23	11	2.87	0	222	13	4/20	19.15	0	0	
3	Greigor Caisley‡	2019	2025	11	89	38	8.09	0	–	–	–	–	1	0	
4	Fahad Ali†	2019	2019	3	3	2	1.00	0	–	–	–	–	4	1	
5	Luiz F Goncalves†	2019	2019	3	16	13	8.00	0	–	–	–	–	1	2	
6	Ismat Ullah	2019	2019	4	44	42	11.00	0	24	1	1/9	16.00	2	0	
7	Muhammad Saleem	2019	2024	11	130	52	11.81	1	84	5	3/19	10.60	4	0	
8	Victor Poubel	2019	2024	5	9	5*	3.00	0	–	–	–	–	0	0////////	
9	Luis Morais	2019	2026	32	486	59	21.13	3	673	36	4/10	16.19	9	0	
10	Kevin Silva	2019	2019	3	1	1	0.50	0	18	3	2/1	6.00	0	0	
11	Yasar Haroon	2019	2026	31	406	47	16.24	0	587	37	5/16	15.72	10	0	
12	Kamal Bishnoi	2019	2019	3	16	14	16.00	0	18	0	–	0	0	–	
13	John Singleton	2019	2019	3	17	7	5.66	0	–	–	–	–	0	0	
14	Chrystian Machado†	2024	2026	24	106	14	6.23	0	–	–	–	–	13	0	
15	Michel Assuncao‡	2024	2026	28	245	31	10.20	0	84	6	2/19	21.16	9	0	
16	Kawsar Khan	2024	2025	8	82	28*	13.66	0	156	10	4/28	14.80	4	0	
17	William Maximo	2024	2026	21	210	35	11.66	0	–	–	–	–	2	1	
18	Luiz Muller	2024	2026	24	508	57*	24.19	1	149	11	2/17	19.63	9	0	
19	Gabriel Oliveira	2024	2026	25	80	15	11.42	0	372	10	3/16	25.06	3	0	
20	Iuri Simao	2024	2024	9	2	2*	0.66	0	192	6	2/18	40.83	0	0	
21	Lucas Maximo†	2024	2026	20	77	12	5.92	0	–	–	–	–	8	5	
22	Luiz Gabriel Moras	2025	2026	19	67	13*	6.70	0	310	10	2/19	35.60	2	0	
23	Felipe Muniz	2025	2025	6	11	8*	5.50	0	72	3	1/15	26.66	0	0	
24	Rejaul Karim	2025	2026	8	59	38	14.75	0	–	–	–	–	1	0	
25	Caique Cirino	2025	2026	2	–	–	–	–	30	1	1/20	37.00	0	0	
26	Sayed Hashimi	2025	2025	1	0	0	0.00	0	–	–	–	–	0	0	
27	Riquelmi Nascimento	2025	2026	13	1	1*	1.00	0	192	9	2/20	22.44	4	0	
28	Breno Passoni	2025	2026	5	3	3*	–	0	6	0	–	–	0	0	
29	Luiz A Goncalves	2026	2026	12	60	24*	10.00	0	114	7	3/7	20.85	3	0	
30	Miguel Silva	2026	2026	2	5	5*	5.00	0	–	–	–	–	0	0	
