= Tony Curry =

Bahamanian baseball player (1937–2006)

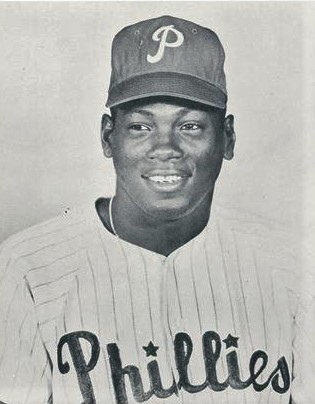
- Outfielder
- Born: December 22, 1937; Nassau, The Bahamas
- Died: October 16, 2006 (aged 68); Nassau, The Bahamas
- Batted: Left Threw: Left

MLB debut
- April 12, 1960, for the Philadelphia Phillies

Last MLB appearance
- July 16, 1966, for the Cleveland Indians

MLB statistics
- Batting average: .246
- Home runs: 6
- Runs batted in: 40
- Stats at Baseball Reference

Teams
- Philadelphia Phillies (1960–1961); Cleveland Indians (1966)

George Anthony Curry (December 22, 1937 – October 16, 2006) was a Bahamian professional baseball outfielder, who appeared in Major League Baseball (MLB) for the Philadelphia Phillies (1960–61) and Cleveland Indians (1966). He was the second Bahamian to reach the major leagues (after André Rodgers). He was listed as 5 feet 11 inches (1.80 m) tall and 185 pounds (84 kg) (13 stone, 3 pounds); Curry threw and batted left-handed.

Curry grew up playing cricket in the Bahamas before moving on to softball and eventually baseball which he played against visiting U.S. Navy personnel. He caught the attention of the Phillies while playing in Miami, signed a contract and began his professional career with the Tampa Tarpons.

Curry's 12-year (1957–68) professional career got off to a promising start. He batted .333, .293, and .313 during his first three Minor League Baseball (MiLB) seasons, with extra-base power. In 1959, in the Class A Eastern League, Curry belted 49 doubles, nine triples and 23 home runs, with 90 runs batted in (RBI). He led the Eastern League in runs scored and hits, and was named Most Valuable Player.

The following year, 1960, Curry spent the entire season on the Phillies' major league roster and appeared in 95 games — 55 of them as a starting outfielder. Benefitting from a torrid start, he was second in the National League (NL) batting race on May 14, peaking at .388 before striking out in his last at bat that day for .380; in that same game, Curry hit his first- and second-MLB homer, at Cincinnati’s Crosley Field, against Jay Hook — and was still at .336, after his first 42 games (through June 23). Curry held on above .300 on July 6, but slumped at the plate and ended the season batting .261 with 64 hits, six home runs, and 34 RBI.

However, 1960 was to be Curry’s only full season in the big leagues. During spring training in 1961, he briefly walked out of the Phillies' camp in a contract dispute. Then, when the regular season began, Curry collected only seven hits in 36 at bats before being demoted to Triple-A. As events turned out, his Philadelphia career was over.

Curry was traded to the Cleveland Indians' organization in March 1962, and he spent much of the rest of his pro career in Triple-A. A strong performance for the Portland Beavers in 1966 earned Curry a six-week call-up to Cleveland in June, but he collected only two hits and three bases on balls in 19 plate appearances as a pinch hitter, in Curry’s last appearance in the major leagues.

In all or parts of three big-league seasons, Curry played in 129 games, with 297 at bats, 33 runs, 73 hits, 16 doubles, two triples, six home runs, 40 RBI, 20 walks, .246 batting average, .295 on-base percentage, .374 slugging percentage, 111 total bases, one sacrifice hit, one sacrifice fly, and two intentional walks.

On October 16, 2006, Curry died in his home city of Nassau at the age of 68.
