= Andrew Westphal =

English cricketer (born 1994)

Personal information
- Full name: Andrew Alexander Westphal
- Born: 28 July 1994 (age 32); Islington, London, England
- Batting: Right-handed
- Bowling: Right-arm medium

International information
- National side: Mexico
- T20I debut (cap 18): 3 October 2019 v Argentina
- Last T20I: 6 October 2019 v Argentina

Domestic team information
- Years: Team
- 2014–2016: Cardiff MCCU
- 2015–2016: Glamorgan CCC 2XI

Career statistics
Competition	T20I	FC	T20
Matches	5	6	5
Runs scored	33	39	33
Batting average	6.60	19.50	6.60
100s/50s	–/–	–/–	–/–
Top score	24	28*	24
Balls bowled	114	684	114
Wickets	5	10	5
Bowling average	13.00	43.70	13.00
5 wickets in innings	–	–	–
10 wickets in match	–	–	–
Best bowling	2/10	3/45	2/10
Catches/stumpings	1/–	2/–	1/–
- Source: ESPNcricinfo, 29 November 2022

Andrew Westphal (born 28 July 1994) is an English cricketer who plays for the Mexico national cricket team. He is a right-handed batsman and a right-arm medium fast bowler, who plays as a batting all-rounder. He made his first-class debut for Cardiff MCCU against Glamorgan on 1 April 2014. He has also represented Glamorgan 2XI, Surrey 2XI and the Combined Universities XI.

In September 2019, he was named in Mexico's Twenty20 International (T20I) squad for the men's tournament at the 2019 South American Cricket Championship. He made his T20I debut for Mexico, against Argentina, on 3 October 2019.

In 2024, he was named in Mexico's Twenty20 International (T20I) squad for the men's tournament at the 2024 South American Cricket Championship in Argentina but due to injury had to withdraw from the squad.
