= List of Mexico Twenty20 International cricketers =

This is a list of Mexican Twenty20 International cricketers.

In April 2018, the ICC decided to grant full Twenty20 International (T20I) status to all its members. Therefore, all Twenty20 matches played between Mexico and other ICC members after 1 January 2019 have the full T20I status. Mexico's first T20I was against Belize on 25 April 2019 in the 2019 Central American Cricket Championship.

This list comprises all members of the Mexico cricket team who have played at least one T20I match. It is initially arranged in the order in which each player won his first Twenty20 cap. Where more than one player won his first Twenty20 cap in the same match, those players are listed alphabetically by surname.

== Key ==
General

- ‡ – Captain
- † – Wicket-keeper
- First – Year of debut
- Last – Year of latest game
- Mat – Number of matches played

Batting

- Runs – Runs scored in career
- HS – Highest score
- Avg – Runs scored per dismissal
- * – Batsman remained not out
- 50 – Half-centuries scored

Bowling

- Balls – Balls bowled in career
- Wkt – Wickets taken in career
- BBI – Best bowling in an innings
- Ave – Average runs per wicket

Fielding

- Ca – Catches taken
- St – Stumpings affected

== List of players ==
Statistics are correct as of 8 August 2026.

Mexico T20I cricketers
General					Batting				Bowling				Fielding		Ref
No.	Name	First	Last	Mat	Runs	HS	Avg	50	Balls	Wkt	BBI	Ave	Ca	St	Ref
1	Kaushal Kumar†	2019	2026	18	195	61*	13.00	1	–	–	–	–	6	4	
2	Revanakumar Ankad	2019	2025	22	147	40*	12.25	0	352	19	3/18	18.05	6	0	
3	Buddhadeb Banerjee†	2019	2019	6	8	6*	4.00	0	–	–	–	–	4	0	
4	Pradeep Chandran	2019	2019	3	31	23	10.33	0	24	2	1/22	22.50	1	0	
5	Gaurav Dutta	2019	2019	7	14	8	2.33	0	–	–	–	–	1	0	
6	Shashikant Laxman	2019	2026	25	253	53	10.54	1	436	24	4/16	16.91	11	0	
7	Rama Inampud	2019	2019	3	23	17*	23.00	0	72	4	2/29	17.00	0	0	
8	Shantanu Kaveri‡	2019	2026	39	506	46*	18.07	0	283	16	4/21	16.62	8	0	
9	Ashwin Sathya	2019	2019	3	61	30	20.33	0	69	4	2/32	19.00	2	0	
10	Tarun Sharma‡	2019	2023	10	176	49*	22.00	0	6	0	–	–	2	0	
11	Jagdeesh Umanath	2019	2025	9	69	25	9.85	0	–	–	–	–	1	0	
12	Puneet Arora	2019	2024	9	113	51*	18.83	1	–	–	–	–	2	0	
13	Shahzad Muhammad	2019	2019	2	14	14	14.00	0	18	1	1/29	29.00	0	0	
14	Nithin Shetty	2019	2019	2	–	–	–	–	48	4	3/17	10.50	3	0	
15	Sanjay Zargar	2019	2019	1	–	–	–	–	18	2	2/22	11.00	0	0	
16	Luis Hermida	2019	2025	20	235	37	15.66	0	300	20	4/38	15.15	6	0	
17	Mahesh Nandela	2019	2019	2	–	–	–	–	6	0	–	–	0	0	
18	Andrew Westphal	2019	2019	5	33	24	6.60	0	114	5	2/10	13.00	1	0	
19	Anurag Tripathi	2019	2025	10	11	6	2.75	0	12	2	2/4	13.00	2	0	
20	Pratik Bais‡	2023	2026	34	54	12	5.40	0	660	36	6/14	16.83	5	0	
21	Mukesh Singh	2023	2023	1	–	–	–	–	–	–	–	–	0	0	
22	Bhargav Narasimha	2023	2026	6	29	13	9.66	0	102	7	3/20	16.00	0	0	
23	Praveen Santhanakrishnan†	2023	2025	22	262	44*	14.55	0	6	0	–	–	8	2	
24	Shoaib Rafiq	2023	2026	20	88	24*	8.00	0	377	25	5/12	11.76	7	0	
25	Seetharam Guruvayoorappan†	2023	2026	9	47	20	11.75	0	–	–	–	–	4	2	
26	Harprit Singh	2023	2024	2	1	1*	–	0	18	1	1/11	32.00	0	0	
27	Srinivasan Elayaperumal	2024	2024	5	7	3	1.40	0	6	0	–	–	0	0	
28	Gustavo Chavez	2024	2026	9	52	25	10.40	0	3	1	1/1	1.00	2	0	
29	Sanjay Wagh	2024	2025	8	136	51	17.00	0	–	–	–	–	1	0	
30	Devjani Mutreja	2024	2026	13	12	4	2.40	0	109	7	3/23	17.42	2	0	
31	Rohit Galgalikar	2024	2026	6	44	18	7.33	0	18	3	3/9	3.00	2	0	
32	Kalyan Manne	2024	2024	1	5	5	5.00	0	–	–	–	–	0	0	
33	Lalit Sharma	2024	2024	1	10	10	10.00	0	18	1	1/29	29.00	1	0	
34	Abhilash Patil	2024	2024	1	12	12	12.00	0	–	–	–	–	1	0	
35	Yashvanth Jasti	2024	2026	11	21	9	3.00	0	202	14	3/5	12.92	4	0	
35	Pradeep Mohanarangam	2024	2025	10	104	33*	17.33	0	166	13	4/15	8.76	7	0	
36	Pradeep Mohanarangam	2024	2024	2	13	13*	13.00	0	28	1	1/17	22.00	2	0	
37	Kashigoud Patil	2024	2026	17	212	37	12.47	0	12	0	–	–	5	0	
38	Rohit Poojary†	2024	2025	10	30	20	4.28	0	–	–	–	–	7	0	
39	Rupesh Singh	2024	2024	4	19	13	4.75	0	–	–	–	–	1	0	
40	Dhananjaya Panda	2025	2026	19	273	56*	21.00	1	299	19	4/6	17.68	8	0	
41	Amir Butt	2025	2026	11	228	73	22.80	1	177	12	2/11	18.75	2	0	
42	Jayanth Byrappa	2025	2026	15	248	62	20.66	1	69	2	2/3	43.50	3	0	
43	Gurpreet Singh	2025	2026	11	178	41	19.77	0	156	9	3/14	19.66	2	0	
44	Hassan Nasir	2025	2026	3	3	3*	–	0	60	1	1/13	52.00	0	0	
45	Sumeet Lahiri	2025	2026	5	5	2	3.00	0	66	8	5/17	10.00	2	0	
46	Sayam Kochar	2026	2026	4	35	26	8.75	0	–	–	–	–	0	0	
47	Devon Ebersohn	2026	2026	8	43	20*	8.60	0	–	–	–	–	4	0	
48	Shubhang Sharma	2026	2026	7	27	21	6.75	0	120	6	2/5	17.00	4	0	
49	Matt Noble	2026	2026	5	1	1*	1.00	0	66	1	1/16	53.00	0	0	
50	Ankush Singh	2026	2026	2	36	36	18.00	0	12	1	1/11	11.00	0	0	
51	Mohit Sharma	2026	2026	3	3	2	1.50	0	33	3	2/10	11.00	0	0	
52	Sai Tallapragada	2026	2026	2	20	18	10.00	0	–	–	–	–	0	0	
53	Waseem Tabrez	2026	2026	3	15	7*	7.50	0	12	0	–	–	0	0	
