= Matthew Featherstone =

English-born Brazilian cricketer (born 1970)

Personal information
- Full name: Matthew Ross Featherstone
- Born: 5 July 1970 (age 56); Bromley, Kent, England
- Batting: Right-handed

Domestic team information
- Years: Team
- 1999–2000: Kent Cricket Board

Career statistics
Competition	List A
Matches	6
Runs scored	205
Batting average	41.00
100s/50s	1/1
Top score	104*
Catches/stumpings	6/–
- Source: Cricinfo, 3 February 2010

Matthew Ross Featherstone (born 5 July 1970) is an English-born former international and List A cricketer. Featherstone played as a right-handed batsman who later captained the Brazil national cricket team.

Featherstone was born at Bromley in Kent in 1970. He was educated at Millfield and taught at Blackheath Preparatory School. He played club cricket for Blackheath and Bromley Cricket Clubs and had appeared for an England Amateur XI before he made his List A debut for Kent Cricket Board in the 1999 NatWest Trophy against Denmark. On debut he scored 104 not out as the Kent recreational side defeated Denmark at The Mote. During the 1999 tournament he played a further two matches against Worcestershire Cricket Board, where he scored 64 runs, and Hampshire.

Featherstone made his last List A appearances for the Kent Cricket Board in the 2000 NatWest Trophy, with his final appearance coming against Hampshire. He ended his one-day career with a batting average of 41.00. He was described by The Times as having an "unusual" batting stance, with his weight well forward, but as being a player who drove the ball well.

== Move to Brazil ==
Featherstone made his debut for Brazil in 2002 against Argentina A in the South American Championships.

By 2006 Featherstone was made captain of the side in time for their match against the Turks and Caicos Islands. He played for the side until 2018 and was later the President of Cricket Brazil.
