= Lautaro Musiani =

Argentine cricketer (born 1996)

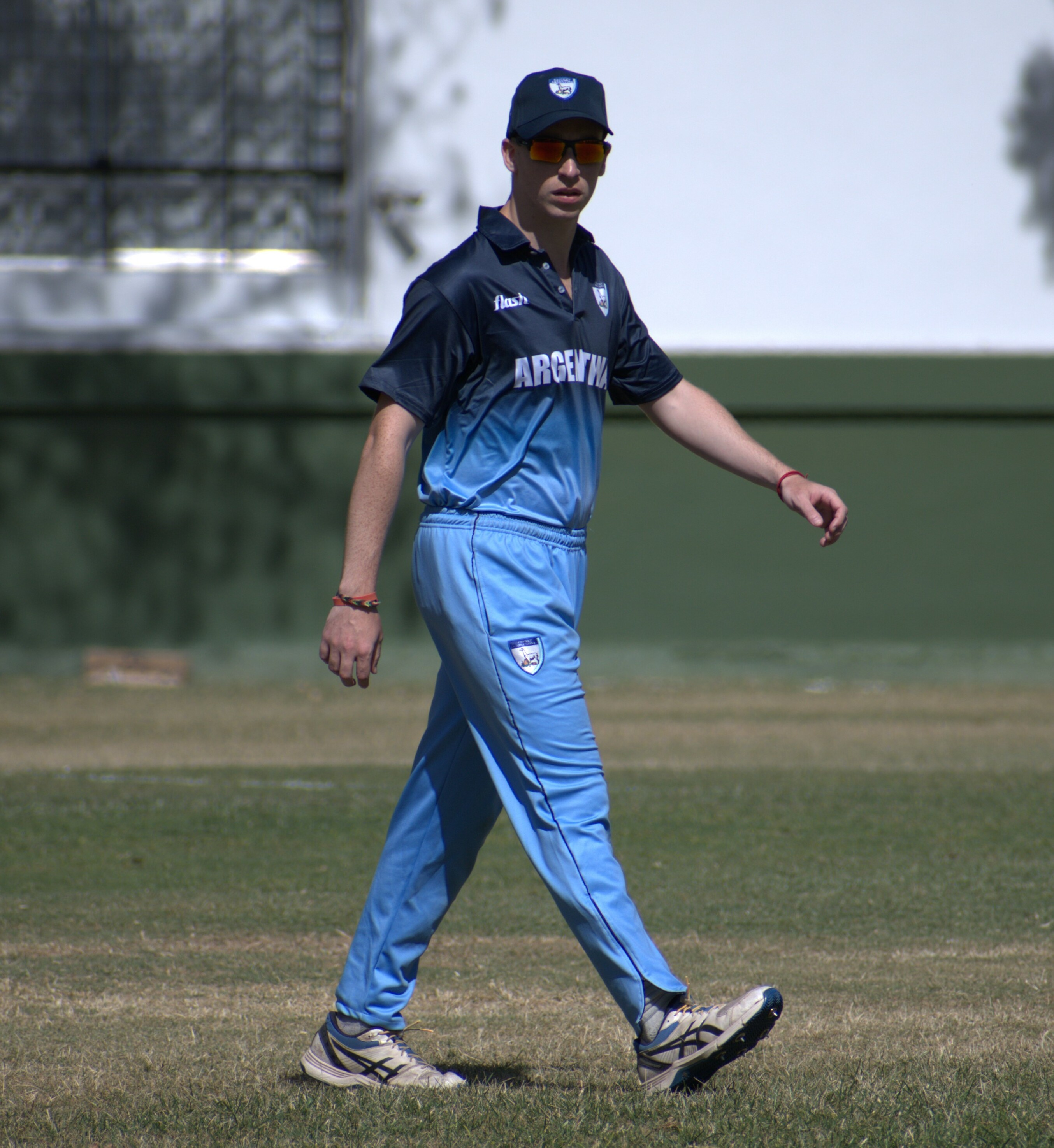

Personal information
- Born: 8 February 1996 (age 30); Adrogué, Argentina
- Batting: Right-handed
- Bowling: Leg break
- Role: Bowler

International information
- National side: Argentina
- T20I debut (cap 9): 3 October 2019 v Mexico
- Last T20I: 4 March 2023 v Cayman Islands

Career statistics
Competition	T20I	T20
Matches	16	16
Runs scored	185	185
Batting average	13.21	13.21
100s/50s	0/0	0/0
Top score	44*	44*
Balls bowled	173	173
Wickets	7	7
Bowling average	25.42	25.42
5 wickets in innings	0	0
10 wickets in match	–	–
Best bowling	3/31	3/31
Catches/stumpings	6/–	6/–
- Source: Cricinfo, 16 October 2025

Lautaro Agustín Musiani (born 8 February 1996) is an Argentine cricketer. He played in the 2012 ICC World Cricket League Division Five and the 2013 ICC World Cricket League Division Six tournaments. Following the 2013 Division Six tournament, Musiani spent time with several teams in England, including a trial with Northamptonshire County Cricket Club.

In September 2019, he was named in Argentina's Twenty20 International (T20I) squad for the men's tournament at the 2019 South American Cricket Championship. He made his T20I debut for Argentina, against Mexico, on 3 October 2019, scoring an unbeaten nine runs to help his side to victory. In November 2021, he was named in Argentina's squad for the 2021 ICC Men's T20 World Cup Americas Qualifier tournament in Antigua.
