= Brazil national cricket team =

Cricket team

Brazil
- Association: Brazilian Cricket Confederation

Personnel
- Captain: Greg Caisley
- Coach: Matthew Featherstone

International Cricket Council
- ICC status: Associate member (2017)
- ICC region: Americas
ICC Rankings	Current	Best-ever
T20I	82nd	69th (13 May 2019)

International cricket
- First international: v. Argentina (1888)

T20 Internationals
- First T20I: v. Chile at El Cortijo Polo Club, Lima; 3 October 2019
- Last T20I: v. Panama at Los Pinos Polo Club Field 1, Cundinamarca; 9 August 2026
T20Is	Played	Won/Lost
Total	32	11/18 (0 ties, 3 no results)
This year	13	7/6 (0 ties, 0 no results)
T20I kit
- As of 9 August 2026

The Brazil national cricket team is the men's team that represents the country of Brazil in international cricket. The team is organised by the Brazilian Cricket Association, which became an affiliate member of the International Cricket Council (ICC) in 2002 and an associate member in 2017. However, the national side has a history dating back much longer, with its first recorded international match coming against Argentina in 1888. Regular international competition commenced in the 1920s, and resumed in the 1950s after a gap during World War II. Almost all of Brazil's matches have come against other South American sides, although in recent years the team has participated in several ICC Americas tournaments, which include sides from Central and North America. At the South American Championships, which commenced in 1995, Brazil has played in all but one edition, with a best finish of second at the 1997 tournament.

== History ==
Brazil became an ICC member in 2002. Its ICC tournament debut came in 2006, when Brazil took part in Division Three of the ICC Americas Championship in Suriname. Although Brazil lost all three opening games in that tournament, no doubt due to lack of international exposure, its cricket has developed since then.

Brazil won the 2009 ICC Americas Championship Division Three, winning all of its matches against Belize, Chile and Peru. This victory enabled Brazil to qualify for the 2010 ICC Americas Championship Division Two.

However, Brazil lost all of their four matches at this higher level, and were relegated to Division Three.

At the South American Championship, Brazil has participated in all but one edition since the tournament began in 1995, with its best finish being second at the 1997 event.

=== 2018–present ===
In April 2018, the ICC decided to grant full Twenty20 International (T20I) status to all its members. Therefore, all Twenty20 matches played between Brazil and other ICC members since 1 January 2019 have been full T20I matches.

Brazil played their first T20I match against Chile on 3 October 2019 during the 2019 South American Cricket Championship in Peru.

3 October 2019
11:45
Scorecard

Brazil; 96/5 (12 overs)	v	Chile; 61/8 (12 overs)
Muhammad Saleem 52 (40); Major Mandy 1/5 (1 over)		Hirenkumar Patel 20 (19); Kevin Silva 2/1 (1 over)

Brazil won by 35 runs
El Cortijo Polo Club Pitch 1, Lima
Umpires: Sandeep Harnal (Can) and Rakesh Jain (Per)

- Chile won the toss and elected to field.
- The match was reduced to 12 overs per side.
- First ever T20I match for Brazil.

== Tournament history ==
=== ICC Americas Championship ===
ICC Americas Championship records
Year	Round	Position	GP	W	L	T	NR
(Canada) 2000	Did not participate						
(Argentina) 2002	Did not participate						
(Bermuda) 2004	Did not participate						
(Suriname) 2006	Round-robin	4/4	3	0	3	0	0
(Argentina) 2008	Round-robin	5/5	4	1	3	0	0
(Chile) 2009	Round-robin	4/4	3	3	0	0	0
(The Bahamas) 2010	Round-robin	5/5	4	0	4	0	0
(Suriname) 2011	Round-robin	6/6	5	0	5	0	0
Total	5/8	0 Title	19	4	15	0	0

=== South American Championship ===
South American Cricket Championship records
Year	Round	Position	GP	W	L	T	NR
(Argentina) 1995	Round-robin	4/4	3	0	3	0	0
(Argentina) 1997	Runners-up	2/4	3	1	2	0	0
(Peru) 1999	Group stage	6/6	2	0	2	0	0
(Argentina) 2000	3rd place	3/7	4	2	1	0	1
(Argentina) 2002	3rd place	3/4	3	1	2	0	0
(Chile) 2004	Group stage	6/8	3	1	2	0	0
(Peru) 2007	Play-offs	4/6	3	1	2	0	0
(Brazil) 2009	3rd place	3/4	3	1	2	0	0
(Chile) 2011	Did not participate						
(Argentina) 2013	3rd place	Records not available					
(Peru) 2014	3rd place	Records not available					
(Chile) 2015	Runners-up	2/6	6	4	2	0	0
(Brazil) 2016	Round-robin	4/6	5	2	3	0	0
(Argentina) 2017	Round-robin	3/7	6	4	2	0	0
(Colombia) 2018	Round robin	6/8	7	2	5	0	0
(Peru) 2019	Round robin	6/7	6	2	4	0	0
(Brazil) 2022	Runners-up	2/7	7	5	2	0	0
(Argentina) 2023	Play-offs	5/8	4	2	2	0	0
(Brazil) 2024	Runners-up	2/8	4	3	1	0	0
(Brazil) 2025	3rd place	3/6	5	3	1	1	0
(Colombia) 2026	Champions	1/6	6	6	0	0	0
Total	19/20	1 Title	81	41	38	1	1

=== Central American Championship ===
Central American Championship records
Host/Year	Round	Position	GP	W	L	T	NR
(Mexico) 2026	Champions	1st	5	3	2	0	0
Total	1/1	1 Title	5	3	2	0	0

=== Other tournaments ===
T20 WC Americas Sub-regional Qualifiers
- 2018: Did not participate
- 2023: Did not participate
- 2024: 9th place

== Records ==
International Match Summary — Brazil

Last updated 9 August 2026

Playing Record
Format	M	W	L	T	NR	Inaugural Match
Twenty20 Internationals	32	11	18	0	3	3 October 2019

=== Twenty20 International ===
- Highest team total: 157/7 v. Costa Rica on 4 April 2026 at Reforma Athletic Club, Naucalpan.
- Highest individual score: 59, Luis Morais v. Mexico on 5 April 2026 at Reforma Athletic Club, Naucalpan.
- Best individual bowling figures: 5/16, Yasar Haroon v. Panama on 12 December 2024 at Estadio Belgrano Athletic, Buenos Aires.

Most T20I runs for Brazil

Player	Runs	Average	Career span
Luis Morais	424	21.20	2019–2026
Luiz Muller	486	21.13	2024–2026
Yasar Haroon	406	16.24	2019–2026
Michel Assuncao	245	10.20	2024–2026
William Maximo	210	11.66	2024–2026

Most T20I wickets for Brazil

Player	Wickets	Average	Career span
Yasar Haroon	37	15.72	2019–2026
Luis Morais	36	16.19	2019–2026
Gabriel Oliveira	16	25.06	2024–2026
Richard Avery	13	19.15	2019–2024
Luiz Muller	11	19.63	2024–2026

T20I record versus other nations

Records complete to T20I #4063. Last updated 9 August 2026.

Opponent	M	W	L	T	NR	First match	First win
vs Associate Members
Argentina	6	0	4	0	2	4 October 2019	
Bahamas	2	0	2	0	0	6 December 2024	
Belize	2	0	2	0	0	15 December 2024	
Bermuda	2	0	2	0	0	11 December 2024	
Cayman Islands	1	0	1	0	0	14 December 2024	
Chile	1	1	0	0	0	3 October 2019	3 October 2019
Costa Rica	2	2	0	0	0	3 April 2026	3 April 2026
Mexico	8	3	5	0	0	5 October 2019	12 October 2024
Panama	5	3	1	0	1	12 December 2024	12 December 2024
Peru	2	1	1	0	0	3 October 2019	6 August 2026
Suriname	1	1	0	0	0	8 December 2024	8 December 2024

=== Other records ===
For a list of selected international matches played by Brazil, see Cricket Archive.

== Coaching staff ==
Position	Name
Head coach	Matthew Featherstone
Assistant Coach	Brendon Louw
Fitness & Conditioning	Rotational
Team Manager	Appointed per tour

== Squad ==
Updated as on 6 December 2024

This lists all the active players who played for Brazil in the 2024 Men's T20 World Cup Americas Sub-regional Qualifier.

Name	Age	Batting style	Bowling style	Last T20I	Notes
Batters
Greg Caisley	49	Right-handed	Right-arm medium	(Argentina) 2024	Captain
Michel Assunção	26	Right-handed	Right-arm medium	(Argentina) 2024	
Lucas Maximo	25	Right-handed	Right-arm medium	(Argentina) 2024	
William Maximo	25	Right-handed	Leg break	(Argentina) 2024	
All-rounders
Yasar Haroon	41	Right-handed	Right-arm off break	(Argentina) 2024	Vice-captain
Kawsar Khan	29	Right-handed	Right-arm fast	(Panama) 2024	
Luis Morais	24	Right-handed	Right-arm medium-fast	(Argentina) 2024	
Luiz Muller	21	Right-handed	Leg break	(Argentina) 2024	
Victor Poubel	33	Right-handed	Right-arm medium-fast	(Cayman Islands) 2024	
Muhammad Saleem	38	Left-handed	Right-arm medium	(Argentina) 2024	
Wicket-keepers
Chrystian Machado	22	Right-handed	—N/a	(Bermuda) 2024	
Pace bowlers
Richard Avery	50	Right-handed	Right-arm medium	(Argentina) 2024	
Gabriel Oliveira	30	Right-handed	Right-arm medium	(Argentina) 2024	
Iuri Simão	23	Left-handed	Left-arm medium	(Argentina) 2024	

== Grounds ==
Locations of all stadiums which have hosted an international cricket match within Brazil

Ground	City	State	Capacity	Matches hosted	Notes
São Fernando Polo and Cricket Club	Itaguaí	Rio de Janeiro	1,000	T20Is, ICC Americas events	Main cricket venue in Brazil; home of Brazil national team
Poços Oval	Poços de Caldas	Minas Gerais	800	T20Is, development matches	Scenic ground; used for ICC and women's cricket events

== See also ==
- List of Brazil Twenty20 International cricketers
- ICC Americas Championship
- South American Cricket Championship
