= Cricket in the Bahamas =

Cricket has been played in The Bahamas since 1846.

== History of cricket ==
It is the oldest sport being played in the country today. The only other sporting event that began before cricket was horse racing, which started in 1796. The Bahamas Cricket Association was formed in 1936 as an organised body. From the 1940s up to the 1970s, cricket was played by just about everyone on the island whether in the road, playground or on cricket fields. Had the Bahamas been part of the West Indies Board, a number of players from the island may have made the national team.

The late 1970s saw the game begin to decline in the country as teachers, who had previously come from the UK with a passion for cricket were replaced by teachers who had been trained in the United States. The Bahamian PE Teachers had no knowledge of the game and instead taught track & field, baseball, softball among other sports. Scholarships abroad for other sports lured the youths away from cricket.

== International competition ==
The Bahamas first appeared in international competition in 2002 when it entered the ICC Americas Championship. After predictably struggling amongst more established nations, it found its feet when the format was changed into three divisions from 2006. It eventually gained promotion to Division One via the 2010 Americas Division Two, a feat that has also earned it a place in the 2010 Pepsi ICC World Cricket League Division Eight.

In 2006, the Bahamas competed in the historical Stanford 20/20 Tournament in Antigua, where the side struggled to compete. An U19 squad competed in the ICC Americas U19 Tournament in Canada from August 11–19, 2007, a first for an Affiliate country in the Americas to participate at this level.

== Domestic competition ==
The local league consists of seniors playing 20-overs competition with ten teams and runs from October to July. During the course of the season, other competitions are played as well, including six-a-side typically on holidays for entertainment. A major six a side match is sponsored by KFC during the labor day weekend. A junior league has been reformed to incorporate the youths of the nation.

== Development programme ==
In 2006, the Association took a bold step in hiring an international cricket coach from England to take the game into the schools. The coach was able to make contact with 26 primary schools in Nassau, seven in Grand Bahama and one in Bimini, where Kwik Cricket was introduced to the young boys and girls. A total of 13,600 kids are involved in that scheme. Out of that programme, the Association was able to start an U15 and U13 league with four teams in each competition, with the U15s playing with a hard ball. An U19 team was also developed with plans in place to sustain the game for years to come.

The national association recently installed three turf wickets at Haynes Oval, which is the main ground; it also has three artificial practice nets. Windsor Park, where the youths play, consists of an artificial pitch and lights around the ground.

== Women's cricket ==
Even though there are already girls involved in the Kwik Cricket League, efforts and plans are being put in place to have a women's team in the future.

== See also ==
- Bahamas Cricket Association
- Bahamas national cricket team
