= Haynes Oval =

Cricket ground in Nassau, The Bahamas

- Interactive map of Haynes Oval

Ground information
- Location: Nassau, The Bahamas
- Country: The Bahamas
- Coordinates: 25°04′40″N 77°21′28″W
- Establishment: 1940

Team information
| Bahamas |

Haynes Oval is a sports ground in Nassau in The Bahamas. It is both the home ground for Cricket in the Bahamas and the practice ground for the Bahamas national cricket team, and the venue for international matches in the country.
