= Martín Siri =

Argentine cricketer

Personal information
- Full name: Ricardo Martín Siri
- Born: 20 April 1979 (age 47); Buenos Aires, Argentina
- Batting: Right-handed
- Bowling: Right-arm off break

International information
- National side: Argentina
- T20I debut (cap 12): 4 October 2019 v Peru
- Last T20I: 14 November 2021 v Bermuda

Career statistics
Competition	T20I	LA	T20
Matches	10	6	10
Runs scored	206	111	206
Batting average	25.75	22.20	25.75
100s/50s	–/–	–/–	–/–
Top score	49*	32*	49*
Catches/stumpings	4/–	1/–	4/–
- Source: Cricinfo, 29 November 2022

Martín Siri (born April 20, 1979 in Buenos Aires) is an Argentine cricketer.

He is a right-handed batsman and a right-arm medium-pace bowler who has played for Argentina since 2000.

Siri debuted against Canada in the 2000 Americas Championship and played frequently in the competition, in which Argentina won one game and finished fifth in the table.

In February 2006, Siri helped Argentina to victory in the ICC World Cricket League Americas Region Division Two, though he was not present in the same competition in August, when Argentina finished bottom of the table with no victories. Siri is an upper-middle-order batsman.

He played in the 2013 ICC World Cricket League Division Six tournament. He made his Twenty20 International (T20I) debut for Argentina, against Peru, in the men's tournament of the 2019 South American Cricket Championship on 4 October 2019. In November 2021, he was named in Argentina's squad for the 2021 ICC Men's T20 World Cup Americas Qualifier tournament in Antigua.
