= 2019 South American Cricket Championship – Men's tournament =

2019 South American Cricket Championship – Men's event
- Dates: 3 – 6 October 2019
- Cricket format: Twenty20 International (Note: Matches involving Colombia or Uruguay did not have T20I status.)
- Tournament format(s): Round-robin and final
- Host: Peru
- Champions: Argentina (10th title)
- Runners-up: Mexico
- Participants: 7
- Matches: 22
- Player of the series: (Chile) Hirenkumar Patel
- Most runs: (Chile) Hirenkumar Patel (129)
- Most wickets: (Chile) Hirenkumar Patel (14)

The 2019 South American Cricket Championship was a cricket tournament that took place in Lima, Peru from 3 to 6 October 2019. This was the sixteenth edition of the men's South American Cricket Championship, and the first in which matches were eligible for Twenty20 International (T20I) status, since the ICC granted T20I status to Twenty20 matches played between all of its Members. Mexico were the defending champions, having won the event in 2018.

The seven participating teams were the national sides of hosts Peru, along with Argentina, Brazil, Chile, Colombia, Mexico and Uruguay. Colombia and Uruguay were not Associate Members of the ICC and so matches involving either of these teams did not have T20I status.

Argentina defeated Mexico by four wickets in the final.

== Squads ==
Argentina	Brazil	Chile	Colombia	Mexico	Peru	Uruguay
Hernán Fennell (c); Bruno Angeletti; Pedro Arrighi; Pedro Baron; Ramiro Escobar (wk); Alejandro Ferguson; Jonathan Hurley; Agustin Husain; Inaki Jimenez; Lautaro Musiani; Santiago Rossi; Martín Siri; Ruann Van Der Merwe	Greigor Caisley (c); Fahad Ali; Jaimin Allen; Richard Avery; Kamal Bishnoi; Luiz Goncalves (wk); Yasar Haroon; Luis Morais; Victor Poubel; Muhammad Saleem; Kevin Silva; John Singleton; Ismat Ullah	Kamlesh Gupta (c, wk); Alex Carthew; Chris Emmott; Shoaib Gazi Hossain; Ignacio Lisboa; Major Mandy; Michael Meade; Irfan Mir; Hirenkumar Patel; Mayanak Patel; Rolando Rivas; Hardev Singh; Aresh Srivastav; Amit Uniyal	Nick Barsby; Mark Edelston; Oliver Farr; Andrew Farrington; Daniel Hall; Viresh Kavikar; Chris Laas; Guy Leslie; Aniket Medellin; Sanjay Pandya; Chris Payne; Patrick Raikes; Satnam Sandhu; Paddy Smallwood (wk); Olly West	Tarun Sharma (c); Kaushal Kumar (wk); Revanakumar Ankad; Aman Arora; Buddhadeb Banerjee (wk); Gaurav Dutta; Luis Hermida; Shashikant Laxman; Shantanu Kaveri; Mahesh Nandela; Anurag Tripathi; Jagdeesh Umanath; Andrew Westphal	Matthew Spry (c); Shaikh Ashraf; Joel Corpus; Diego de la Puente; Henry Dixon; Hafez Farooq; Steven Hallett (wk); Mohsin Hub; Alexander James; Waqar Khan; Suresh Kumar; Christopher Mahoney; Oliver Marshall; Joaquin Salazar; Pravin Shamdasani; Jagjit Singh	Boopathy Ravi (c); Althaf Ahmed; Beerbal Abdulkhader; Vatsal Desai; Gokul G.; Soham Gupta; Syed Hidhayathullah; Gopi Krishnan; Nishant M.V.; Avijit Mukherjee; Savin Prakash; Rajendra Rathod; Jashwant Reddy (wk); Alistair Sharp; Robert Sharp; Ramsoorya Singaram; Deeshan Vasagiri

== Round-robin ==
=== Points table ===
Team	P	W	L	T	NR	Pts	NRR
Argentina	6	5	1	0	0	15	+0.713
Mexico	6	4	2	0	0	12	+0.756
Peru	6	4	2	0	0	12	+0.310
Colombia	6	2	4	0	0	6	+0.002
Uruguay	6	2	4	0	0	6	–0.167
Brazil	6	2	4	0	0	6	–0.355
Chile	6	2	4	0	0	6	–1.246

Advanced to the final

=== Matches ===
3 October 2019
08:30
Scorecard

Mexico; 46/8 (12 overs)	v	Argentina; 47/1 (6.3 overs)
Tarun Sharma 22 (21); Hernán Fennell 2/3 (1 over)		Hernán Fennell 25* (17); Luis Hermida 1/17 (2 overs)

Argentina won by 9 wickets
El Cortijo Polo Club Pitch 1, Lima
Umpires: Oscar Andrade (Ber) and Sandeep Harnal (Can)

- Argentina won the toss and elected to field.
- The match was reduced to 12 overs per side.
- Bruno Angeletti, Pedro Arrighi, Pedro Baron, Ramiro Escobar, Hernán Fennell, Alejandro Ferguson, Jonathan Hurley, Agustin Husain, Lautaro Musiani, Santiago Rossi, Ruann Van Der Merwe (Arg), Luis Hermida, Mahesh Nandela and Andrew Westphal (Mex) all made their T20I debuts.
- Argentina played their first men's T20I match.

3 October 2019
08:30
Scorecard

Chile; 76/6 (12 overs)	v	Uruguay; 77/9 (11.3 overs)
Aresh Srivastav 21 (19); Syed Hidhayathullah 2/18 (3 overs)		Savin Prakash 43* (37); Hirenkumar Patel 3/13 (3 overs)

Uruguay won by 1 wicket
El Cortijo Polo Club Pitch 3, Lima
Umpires: Josh Russell and Stuart West

- Uruguay won the toss and elected to field.
- The match was reduced to 12 overs per side.

3 October 2019
08:30
Scorecard

Colombia; 55/8 (12 overs)	v	Peru; 56/2 (7.1 overs)
Paddy Smallwood 18 (24); Pravin Shamdasani 3/6 (3 overs)		Shaikh Ashraf 28 (15); Andrew Farrington 1/6 (1.1 overs)

Peru won by 8 wickets
El Cortijo Polo Club Pitch 2, Lima
Umpires: Harry Hildebrand (Per) and Mohan Veswani

- Peru won the toss and elected to field.
- The match was reduced to 12 overs per side.

3 October 2019
11:45
Scorecard

Brazil; 96/5 (12 overs)	v	Chile; 61/8 (12 overs)
Muhammad Saleem 52 (40); Major Mandy 1/5 (1 over)		Hirenkumar Patel 20 (19); Kevin Silva 2/1 (1 over)

Brazil won by 35 runs
El Cortijo Polo Club Pitch 1, Lima
Umpires: Sandeep Harnal (Can) and Rakesh Jain (Per)

- Chile won the toss and elected to field.
- The match was reduced to 12 overs per side.
- Jaimin Allen, Fahad Ali, Richard Avery, Greigor Caisley, Luiz Goncalves, Yasar Haroon, Victor Poubel, Luis Morais, Muhammad Saleem, Kevin Silva, Ismat Ullah (Bra), Alex Carthew, Chris Emmott, Kamlesh Gupta, Shoaib Gazi Hossain, Major Mandy, Irfan Mir, Hirenkumar Patel, Mayanak Patel, Hardev Singh, Aresh Srivastav and Amit Uniyal (Chi) all made their T20I debuts.
Brazil and Chile both played their first men's T20I match.

3 October 2019
11:45
Scorecard

Mexico; 91/5 (12 overs)	v	Uruguay; 74/6 (12 overs)
Andrew Westphal 29 (29); Gopi Krishnan 2/12 (2 overs)		Rajendra Rathod 17 (26); Aman Arora 2/18 (3 overs)

Mexico won by 17 runs
El Cortijo Polo Club Pitch 2, Lima
Umpires: Harry Hildebrand (Per) and Josh Russell

- Uruguay won the toss and elected to field.
- The match was reduced to 12 overs per side.

3 October 2019
15:00
Scorecard

Peru; 75/5 (12 overs)	v	Brazil; 73/9 (12 overs)
Joaquin Salazar 20* (16); Richard Avery 2/16 (3 overs)		Greigor Caisley 38 (26); Matthew Spry 3/5 (2 overs)

Peru won by 2 runs
El Cortijo Polo Club Pitch 3, Lima
Umpires: Oscar Andrade (Ber) and Rakesh Jain (Per)

- Peru won the toss and elected to bat.
- The match was reduced to 12 overs per side.
- Shaikh Ashraf, Hafez Farooq, Steven Hallett, Mohsin Hub, Waqar Khan, Christopher Mahoney, Oliver Marshall, Joaquin Salazar, Pravin Shamdasani, Jagjit Singh, Matthew Spry (Per), Kamal Bishnoi and John Singleton (Bra) all made their T20I debuts.
Peru played their first men's T20I match.

3 October 2019
15:00
Scorecard

Argentina; 49 (10 overs)	v	Colombia; 52/2 (8.3 overs)
Alejandro Ferguson 14 (12); Nick Barsby 2/6 (1 over)		Nick Barsby 40* (38); Santiago Rossi 2/14 (2 overs)

Colombia won by 8 wickets
El Cortijo Polo Club Pitch 2, Lima
Umpires: Mohan Veswani and Stuart West

- Colombia won the toss and elected to field.
- The match was reduced to 12 overs per side.

4 October 2019
08:30
Scorecard

Mexico; 99/8 (18 overs)	v	Chile; 104/6 (17.3 overs)
Jagdeesh Umanath 25 (22); Hirenkumar Patel 4/21 (4 overs)		Hirenkumar Patel 22 (20); Luis Hermida 2/15 (4 overs); Andrew Westphal 2/15 (4 overs)

Chile won by 4 wickets
El Cortijo Polo Club Pitch 2, Lima
Umpires: Sandeep Harnal (Can) and Ken Patel (Can)

- Chile won the toss and elected to field.
- The match was reduced to 18 overs per side.
- Rolando Rivas (Chi) made his T20I debut.

4 October 2019
08:30
Scorecard

Uruguay; 106/7 (18 overs)	v	Brazil; 109/3 (15.3 overs)
Vatsal Desai 31 (37); Kevin Silva 2/12 (2 overs)		Greigor Caisley 56* (50); Boopathy Ravi 2/19 (3.3 overs)

Brazil won by 7 wickets
El Cortijo Polo Club Pitch 3, Lima
Umpires: Ian Roughton (Per) and Stuart West

- Brazil won the toss and elected to field.
- The match was reduced to 18 overs per side.

4 October 2019
11:45
Scorecard

Peru; 85 (17.5 overs)	v	Argentina; 86/3 (14 overs)
Hafez Farooq 24 (30); Ruann Van Der Merwe 3/9 (4 overs)		Martín Siri 49* (44); Pravin Shamdasani 2/8 (3 overs)

Argentina won by 7 wickets
El Cortijo Polo Club Pitch 3, Lima
Umpires: Sandeep Harnal (Can) and Ashish Shah (Can)

- Argentina won the toss and elected to field.
- The match was reduced to 18 overs per side.
- Diego de la Puente (Per) and Martín Siri (Arg) both made their T20I debuts.

4 October 2019
11:45
Scorecard

Chile; 129/6 (18 overs)	v	Colombia; 118/8 (18 overs)
Hirenkumar Patel 50 (44); Chris Laas 4/31 (4 overs)		Satnam Sandhu 31 (18); Hirenkumar Patel 4/14 (4 overs)

Chile won by 11 runs
El Cortijo Polo Club Pitch 1, Lima
Umpires: Harry Hildebrand (Per) and Mohan Veswani

- Colombia won the toss and elected to field.
- The match was reduced to 18 overs per side.

4 October 2019
15:00
Scorecard

Argentina; 105/9 (18 overs)	v	Brazil; 76/9 (18 overs)
Pedro Baron 27 (22); Luis Morais 3/15 (4 overs)		Ismat Ullah 42 (36); Pedro Arrighi 5/4 (4 overs)

Argentina won by 29 runs
El Cortijo Polo Club Pitch 3, Lima
Umpires: Ken Patel (Can) and Ashish Shah (Can)

- Brazil won the toss and elected to field.
- The match was reduced to 18 overs per side.
- Pedro Arrighi became the first bowler for Argentina to take a five-wicket haul in T20Is.

4 October 2019
15:00
Scorecard

Colombia; 88 (17.5 overs)	v	Mexico; 94/6 (16.5 overs)
Sanjay Pandya 22 (28); Shantanu Kaveri 3/18 (3 overs)		Tarun Sharma 16 (14); Guy Leslie 4/11 (4 overs)

Mexico won by 4 wickets
El Cortijo Polo Club Pitch 1, Lima
Umpires: Mohan Veswani and Stuart West

- Mexico won the toss and elected to field.
- The match was reduced to 18 overs per side.

4 October 2019
15:00
Scorecard

Uruguay; 112/5 (18 overs)	v	Peru; 113/9 (18 overs)
Savin Prakash 39 (35); Waqar Khan 2/17 (4 overs); Suresh Kumar 2/17 (4 overs)		Suresh Kumar 18* (12); Boopathy Ravi 3/22 (4 overs)

Peru won by 1 wicket
El Cortijo Polo Club Pitch 2, Lima
Umpires: Harry Hildebrand (Per) and Ian Roughton (Per)

- Peru won the toss and elected to field.
- The match was reduced to 18 overs per side.

5 October 2019
08:30
Scorecard

Argentina; 102/7 (18 overs)	v	Chile; 74/6 (18 overs)
Alejandro Ferguson 51 (53); Major Mandy 2/19 (4 overs)		Hardev Singh 17 (28); Hernán Fennell 4/12 (4 overs)

Argentina won by 28 runs
El Cortijo Polo Club Pitch 1, Lima
Umpires: Oscar Andrade (Ber) and Ken Patel (Can)

- Chile won the toss and elected to field.
- The match was reduced to 18 overs per side.

5 October 2019
08:30
Scorecard

Mexico; 132/8 (18 overs)	v	Peru; 93/9 (18 overs)
Shantanu Kaveri 43 (35); Waqar Khan 3/21 (3 overs)		Shaikh Ashraf 25 (17); Luis Hermida 3/20 (4 overs)

Mexico won by 39 runs
El Cortijo Polo Club Pitch 3, Lima
Umpires: Rakesh Jain (Per) and Deepak Kumar (Can)

- Peru won the toss and elected to field.
- The match was reduced to 18 overs per side.
- Suresh Kumar (Per) and Anurag Tripathi (Mex) both made their T20I debuts.

5 October 2019
08:30
Scorecard

Colombia; 96 (17.5 overs)	v	Uruguay; 100/5 (15.4 overs)
Mark Edelston 18 (24); Gokul G 4/14 (4 overs)		Jashwant Reddy 50* (25); Chris Laas 2/15 (4 overs)

Uruguay won by 5 wickets
El Cortijo Polo Club Pitch 2, Lima
Umpires: Ian Roughton (Per) and Chris Thomas

- Uruguay won the toss and elected to field.
- The match was reduced to 18 overs per side.

5 October 2019
11:45
Scorecard

Peru; 153/5 (18 overs)	v	Chile; 93 (15 overs)
Shaikh Ashraf 38 (26); Alex Carthew 1/19 (2 overs)		Major Mandy 32 (29); Matthew Spry 4/8 (2 overs)

Peru won by 60 runs
El Cortijo Polo Club Pitch 2, Lima
Umpires: Oscar Andrade (Ber) and Deepak Kumar (Can)

- Peru won the toss and elected to bat.
- The match was reduced to 18 overs per side.
- Ignacio Lisboa and Michael Meade (Chi) both made their T20I debuts.

5 October 2019
11:45
Scorecard

Colombia; 107/5 (18 overs)	v	Brazil; 94 (16 overs)
Chris Laas 34 (35); Yasar Haroon 3/16 (4 overs)		Richard Avery 18* (20); Guy Leslie 5/12 (4 overs)

Colombia won by 13 runs
El Cortijo Polo Club Pitch 1, Lima
Umpires: Mohan Veswani and Stuart West

- Colombia won the toss and elected to bat.
- The match was reduced to 18 overs per side.

5 October 2019
15:00
Scorecard

Mexico; 96/5 (18 overs)	v	Brazil; 76 (17.3 overs)
Shantanu Kaveri 35 (39); Yasar Haroon 1/11 (4 overs)		Yasar Haroon 29 (37); Shashikant Laxman 4/16 (3 overs)

Mexico won by 20 runs
El Cortijo Polo Club Pitch 3, Lima
Umpires: Rakesh Jain (Per) and Deepak Kumar (Can)

- Mexico won the toss and elected to bat.
- The match was reduced to 18 overs per side.

5 October 2019
15:00
Scorecard

Argentina; 121/5 (18 overs)	v	Uruguay; 119 (18 overs)
Lautaro Musiani 50 (45); Gokul G 3/32 (4 overs)		Jashwant Reddy 28 (26); Jonathan Hurley 2/11 (2 overs)

Argentina won by 2 runs
El Cortijo Polo Club Pitch 1, Lima
Umpires: Harry Hildebrand (Per) and Chris Thomas

- Uruguay won the toss and elected to field.
- The match was reduced to 18 overs per side.

== Final ==
6 October 2019
15:00
Scorecard

Mexico; 105/9 (20 overs)	v	Argentina; 111/6 (18.4 overs)
Shashikant Laxman 35 (25); Jonathan Hurley 3/13 (4 overs)		Martín Siri 27 (25); Shashikant Laxman 2/14 (3 overs)

Argentina won by 4 wickets
Lima Cricket and Football Club, Lima
Umpires: Oscar Andrade (Ber) and Deepak Kumar (Can)

- Mexico won the toss and elected to bat.

== See also ==
- 2019 South American Cricket Championship – Women's tournament
