= El Cortijo Polo Club =

Cricket ground

El Cortijo Polo Club Pitch A Ground
Ground information
- Location: Lima
- Tenants: Peru national cricket team

International information
- First men's T20I: 3 October 2019: Argentina v Mexico
- Last men's T20I: 5 October 2019: Peru v Chile
- As of 18 October 2023; Source: El Cortijo Polo Club Pitch A Ground Cricinfo

The El Cortijo Polo Club is a sports ground near Lima, Peru. In September 2019, it was announced as one of the venues to host cricket matches in the 2019 South American Cricket Championship, a Twenty20 International (T20I) cricket tournament.

El Cortijo Polo Club Pitch B Ground
Ground information
- Location: Lima
- Tenants: Peru national cricket team

International information
- First men's T20I: 3 October 2019: Brazil v Chile
- Last men's T20I: 5 October 2019: Brazil v Mexico
- As of 18 October 2023; Source: El Cortijo Polo Club Pitch B Ground Cricinfo

== See also ==
- Peru national cricket team
